= 1961 Kansas City Athletics season =

1961 Kansas City Athletics
- League: American League
- Ballpark: Municipal Stadium
- City: Kansas City, Missouri
- Record: 61–100 (.379)
- League place: T–9th
- Owners: Charles O. Finley
- General managers: Frank Lane, Pat Friday
- Managers: Joe Gordon, Hank Bauer
- Television: WDAF-TV
- Radio: WDAF (Merle Harmon, Bill Grigsby)

The 1961 Kansas City Athletics season was a season in American baseball. In their seventh season in Kansas City, the 61st overall for the franchise, the A's finished with a record of 61–100, tying the expansion Washington Senators for ninth place, last in the newly expanded 10-team American League. The A's finished nine games behind the league's other expansion team, the Los Angeles Angels and 47 1/2 games behind the World Champion New York Yankees.

== Offseason ==
On December 19, 1960, Charles "Charlie O." Finley purchased a controlling interest in the team from Arnold Johnson's estate. In a highly publicized move, he purchased a bus, pointed it in the direction of New York, and burned it to symbolize the end of the "special relationship" with the Yankees. He called another press conference to burn the existing lease at Municipal Stadium, where the team played its home games, which included the despised "escape clause."

Finley made numerous renovations to the stadium, including lighting outside, and radio broadcasts in the restrooms. The seats were painted yellow, turquoise and orange, while a picnic area was added behind new bleacher seats in right field, and lights were added to the dugout.

In addition, Finley introduced new uniforms, which had "Kansas City" on the road uniforms for the first time ever and an interlocking "KC" on the cap.

=== Notable transactions ===
- January 24, 1961: Whitey Herzog and Russ Snyder were traded by the Athletics to the Baltimore Orioles for Bob Boyd, Al Pilarcik, Jim Archer, Wayne Causey, and Clint Courtney. Clint Courtney was returned to the Orioles on April 14.

== Regular season ==
Finley hired Frank Lane, a veteran baseball man with a reputation as a prolific trader, as general manager on January 2. However, Lane did not even last through the season, as he was fired on August 22 and replaced by Pat Friday.

- Part of the tension between Finley and Lane occurred when Finley advised Lane that he wanted to move the club's spring training facilities from West Palm Beach, Florida, to Chandler, Arizona. Lane had negotiated with city officials in Chandler and was prepared to sign a lease. A report on the radio had indicated that Finley reached his own deal with West Palm Beach and signed a five-year lease extension.
- On June 14, 1961, the feud between Charlie Finley and Frank Lane worsened as Lane traded fan favourite Bud Daley. Lane stated this was done in an attempt to embarrass the owner. Lew Krausse Jr. made his major league debut on June 16, 1961, versus the Los Angeles Angels. Krausse had received a bonus of $125,000 to sign with the club. Finley admitted that he had the highly touted Krausse appear in a game so that fans could forget about the Bud Daley trade.
- August 17, 1961: Kansas City Star sportswriter Ernie Mehl had published a story indicating that Charlie Finley was ready to relocate the club to Dallas, Texas. Mehl found out about the proposed relocation because Finley went on a trip to Dallas with the supervisor of American League umpires Cal Hubbard. During the trip, the two visited the Cotton Bowl and Burnett Field. Finley was furious and it led to a long rivalry between the two. Three days later, Finley attempted to publicly humiliate Mehl by having an Ernie Mehl Appreciation Day. Ceremonies for Mehl were held in between a doubleheader with the Chicago White Sox. Finley presented Mehl with a Poison Pen Award in absentia.

=== Gimmicks ===
- Finley had a mechanical rabbit named Harvey installed to the right of home plate. Whenever the umpire required more baseballs, Harvey would emerge from a spot in the grass with a cage of baseballs. As the rabbit would emerge, the organist would play Here Comes Peter Cottontail.
- Sheep were on a tall rocky hill beyond the right field fence. Finley had employees dressed as sheep herders, and the employees would ring a bell whenever an Athletics player hit a home run.

=== Season standings ===
American League
Team	W	L	Pct.	GB	Home	Road
New York Yankees	109	53	.673	—	65‍–‍16	44‍–‍37
Detroit Tigers	101	61	.623	8	50‍–‍31	51‍–‍30
Baltimore Orioles	95	67	.586	14	48‍–‍33	47‍–‍34
Chicago White Sox	86	76	.531	23	53‍–‍28	33‍–‍48
Cleveland Indians	78	83	.484	30½	40‍–‍41	38‍–‍42
Boston Red Sox	76	86	.469	33	50‍–‍31	26‍–‍55
Minnesota Twins	70	90	.438	38	36‍–‍44	34‍–‍46
Los Angeles Angels	70	91	.435	38½	46‍–‍36	24‍–‍55
Kansas City Athletics	61	100	.379	47½	33‍–‍47	28‍–‍53
Washington Senators	61	100	.379	47½	33‍–‍46	28‍–‍54

=== Record vs. opponents ===
1961 American League record Sources:
Team	BAL	BOS	CWS	CLE	DET	KCA	LAA	MIN	NYY	WAS
Baltimore	—	11–7	11–7	9–9	9–9	13–5	8–10	11–7	9–9–1	14–4
Boston	7–11	—	9–9	5–13	8–10	10–8	11–7–1	11–7	5–13	10–8
Chicago	7–11	9–9	—	12–6	6–12	14–4	10–8	9–9–1	6–12	13–5
Cleveland	9–9	13–5	6–12	—	6–12	8–9	10–8	10–8	4–14	12–6
Detroit	9–9	10–8	12–6	12–6	—	12–6–1	14–4	11–7	8–10	13–5
Kansas City	5–13	8–10	4–14	9–8	6–12–1	—	9–9	7–11	4–14	9–9
Los Angeles	10–8	7–11–1	8–10	8–10	4–14	9–9	—	8–9	6–12	10–8
Minnesota	7–11	7–11	9–9–1	8–10	7–11	11–7	9–8	—	4–14	8–9
New York	9–9–1	13–5	12–6	14–4	10–8	14–4	12–6	14–4	—	11–7
Washington	4–14	8–10	5–13	6–12	5–13	9–9	8–10	9–8	7–11	—

=== Notable transactions ===
- April 25, 1961: Bert Campaneris was signed as an amateur free agent by the Athletics.
- June 1, 1961: Bill Tuttle and a player to be named later were traded by the Athletics to the Minnesota Twins for Reno Bertoia, Paul Giel and a player to be named later. The Athletics completed the deal by returning Paul Giel to the Twins in exchange for cash on June 10.
- June 8, 1961: Marv Throneberry was traded by the Athletics to the Baltimore Orioles for Gene Stephens.
- June 10, 1961: Ray Herbert, Don Larsen, Andy Carey, and Al Pilarcik were traded by the Athletics to the Chicago White Sox for Wes Covington, Stan Johnson, Bob Shaw, and Gerry Staley.
- July 2, 1961: Wes Covington was traded by the Athletics to the Philadelphia Phillies for Bobby Del Greco.
- August 2, 1961: Gerry Staley and Reno Bertoia were traded by the Athletics to the Detroit Tigers for Bill Fischer and Ozzie Virgil.

=== Roster ===
1961 Kansas City Athletics
Roster
Pitchers: 20 Jim Archer; 30 Norm Bass; 28 Bud Daley; 28 Art Ditmar; 31 Bill Fischer; 27 Paul Giel; 38 Ray Herbert; 17 Ken Johnson; 36 Ed Keegan; 29 Bill Kirk; 24 Lew Krausse Jr.; 32 Bill Kunkel; 18 Don Larsen; 22 Mickey McDermott; 33 Joe Nuxhall; 27 Dan Pfister; 35 Ed Rakow; 26 Bob Shaw; 38 Gerry Staley; 23 Jerry Walker; 27 Dave Wickersham; 27 John Wyatt	Catchers: 5,18 Billy Bryan; 16 Gordon Mackenzie; 12 Joe Pignatano; 8 Haywood Sullivan; Infielders: 16 Reno Bertoia; 10 Bob Boyd; 1 Andy Carey; 2 Wayne Causey; 1 Dick Howser; 4 Lou Klimchock; 11 Jerry Lumpe; 45 Charlie Shoemaker; 7 Norm Siebern; 3 Marv Throneberry; 4 Ozzie Virgil	Outfielders: 9 Hank Bauer; 25 Frank Cipriani; 14 Wes Covington; 14 Bobby Del Greco; 16 Chuck Essegian; 21 Jay Hankins; 6 Deron Johnson; 22 Stan Johnson; 14 Al Pilarcik; 19 Leo Posada; 22 Bobby Prescott; 10 Jim Rivera; 3 Gene Stephens; 13 Bill Tuttle; Other batters: 22 Clint Courtney	Manager: 9 Hank Bauer; 39 Joe Gordon; Coaches: 42 Ed Fitz Gerald; 40 Dario Lodigiani; 44 Johnny Mize; 41 Jo-Jo White; 37 Ted Wilks

== Player stats ==
= Indicates team leader

=== Batting ===
==== Starters by position ====
Note: Pos = Position; G = Games played; AB = At bats; H = Hits; Avg. = Batting average; HR = Home runs; RBI = Runs batted in

Pos	Player	G	AB	H	Avg.	HR	RBI
C	Haywood Sullivan	117	331	80	.242	6	40
1B	Norm Siebern	153	560	166	.296	18	98
2B	Jerry Lumpe	148	569	167	.293	3	54
SS	Dick Howser	158	611	171	.280	3	45
3B	Wayne Causey	104	312	86	.276	8	49
LF	Leo Posada	116	344	87	.253	7	53
CF	Bobby Del Greco	74	239	55	.230	5	21
RF	Jim Rivera	64	141	34	.241	2	10

==== Other batters ====
Note: G = Games played; AB = At bats; H = Hits; Avg. = Batting average; HR = Home runs; RBI = Runs batted in

Player	G	AB	H	Avg.	HR	RBI
Deron Johnson	83	283	61	.216	8	42
Joe Pignatano	92	243	59	.243	4	22
Gene Stephens	62	183	38	.208	4	26
Jay Hankins	76	173	32	.185	3	6
Marv Throneberry	40	130	31	.238	6	24
Andy Carey	39	123	30	.244	3	11
Lou Klimchock	57	121	26	.215	1	16
Reno Bertoia	39	120	29	.242	0	13
Hank Bauer	43	106	28	.264	3	18
Bill Tuttle	25	84	22	.262	0	8
Al Pilarcik	35	60	12	.200	0	9
Bob Boyd	26	48	11	.229	0	9
Wes Covington	17	44	7	.159	1	6
Frank Cipriani	13	36	9	.250	0	2
Charlie Shoemaker	7	26	10	.385	0	1
Gordon Mackenzie	11	24	3	.125	0	1
Ozzie Virgil	11	21	3	.143	0	0
Billy Bryan	9	19	3	.158	1	2
Bobby Prescott	10	12	1	.083	0	0
Chuck Essegian	4	6	2	.333	0	1
Stan Johnson	3	3	0	.000	0	0
Clint Courtney	1	1	0	.000	0	0

=== Pitching ===
==== Starting pitchers ====
Note: G = Games pitched; IP = Innings pitched; W = Wins; L = Losses; ERA = Earned run average; SO = Strikeouts

Player	G	IP	W	L	ERA	SO
Jim Archer	39	205.1	9	15	3.20	110
Bob Shaw	26	150.1	9	10	4.31	60
Ray Herbert	13	83.2	3	6	5.38	34
Bill Kirk	1	3.0	0	0	12.00	3

==== Other pitchers ====
Note: G = Games pitched; IP = Innings pitched; W = Wins; L = Losses; ERA = Earned run average; SO = Strikeouts

Player	G	IP	W	L	ERA	SO
Norm Bass	40	170.2	11	11	4.69	74
Jerry Walker	36	168.0	8	14	4.82	56
Joe Nuxhall	37	128.0	5	8	5.34	81
Ed Rakow	45	124.2	2	8	4.76	81
Bud Daley	16	63.2	4	8	4.95	36
Lew Krausse Jr.	12	55.2	2	5	4.85	32
Art Ditmar	20	54.0	0	5	5.67	19
Don Larsen	8	15.0	1	0	4.20	13
Ken Johnson	6	9.1	0	4	10.61	4

==== Relief pitchers ====
Note: G = Games pitched; W = Wins; L = Losses; SV = Saves; ERA = Earned run average; SO = Strikeouts

Player	G	W	L	SV	ERA	SO
Bill Kunkel	58	3	4	4	5.18	46
Gerry Staley	23	1	1	2	3.60	16
Dave Wickersham	17	2	1	2	5.14	10
Bill Fischer	15	1	0	2	3.86	12
Ed Keegan	6	0	0	1	4.50	3
John Wyatt	5	0	0	1	2.45	6
Mickey McDermott	4	0	0	0	14.29	3
Dan Pfister	2	0	0	0	15.43	3
Paul Giel	1	0	0	0	37.80	1

== Farm system ==
Level	Team	League	Manager
AAA	Hawaii Islanders	Pacific Coast League	Tommy Heath and Bill Werle
AA	Shreveport Sports	Southern Association	Les Peden
A	Portsmouth-Norfolk Tides	Sally League	Granny Hamner
B	Lewiston Broncos	Northwest League	John McNamara
C	Visalia Athletics	California League	Bobby Hofman
C	Pocatello Bannocks	Pioneer League	Bert Thiel
D	Sarasota Sun Sox	Florida State League	Bill Robertson
D	Albuquerque Dukes	Sophomore League	Grady Wilson

LEAGUE CHAMPIONS: Lewiston Pocatello affiliation shared with San Francisco Giants
