= 1961 Chicago White Sox season =

1961 Chicago White Sox
- League: American League
- Ballpark: Comiskey Park
- City: Chicago
- Record: 86–76 (.531)
- League place: 4th
- Owners: Bill Veeck, Arthur Allyn, Jr., John Allyn
- General managers: Hank Greenberg, Ed Short
- Managers: Al López
- Television: WGN-TV (Jack Brickhouse, Vince Lloyd)
- Radio: WCFL (Bob Elson, Ralph Kiner)

The 1961 Chicago White Sox season was the team's 61st season in the major leagues, and its 62nd season overall. They finished with a record of 86–76, good enough for fourth place in the American League, 23 games behind the first-place New York Yankees. Their pitching staff surrendered 13 of Roger Maris's 61 home runs that year, the most of any team.

== Offseason ==
- December 14, 1960: 1960 MLB expansion draft
  - Earl Averill, Jr. was drafted from the White Sox by the Los Angeles Angels.
  - Jim McAnany was drafted from the White Sox by the Los Angeles Angels.

== Regular season ==
=== Season standings ===
American League
Team	W	L	Pct.	GB	Home	Road
New York Yankees	109	53	.673	—	65‍–‍16	44‍–‍37
Detroit Tigers	101	61	.623	8	50‍–‍31	51‍–‍30
Baltimore Orioles	95	67	.586	14	48‍–‍33	47‍–‍34
Chicago White Sox	86	76	.531	23	53‍–‍28	33‍–‍48
Cleveland Indians	78	83	.484	30½	40‍–‍41	38‍–‍42
Boston Red Sox	76	86	.469	33	50‍–‍31	26‍–‍55
Minnesota Twins	70	90	.438	38	36‍–‍44	34‍–‍46
Los Angeles Angels	70	91	.435	38½	46‍–‍36	24‍–‍55
Kansas City Athletics	61	100	.379	47½	33‍–‍47	28‍–‍53
Washington Senators	61	100	.379	47½	33‍–‍46	28‍–‍54

=== Record vs. opponents ===
1961 American League record Sources:
Team	BAL	BOS	CWS	CLE	DET	KCA	LAA	MIN	NYY	WAS
Baltimore	—	11–7	11–7	9–9	9–9	13–5	8–10	11–7	9–9–1	14–4
Boston	7–11	—	9–9	5–13	8–10	10–8	11–7–1	11–7	5–13	10–8
Chicago	7–11	9–9	—	12–6	6–12	14–4	10–8	9–9–1	6–12	13–5
Cleveland	9–9	13–5	6–12	—	6–12	8–9	10–8	10–8	4–14	12–6
Detroit	9–9	10–8	12–6	12–6	—	12–6–1	14–4	11–7	8–10	13–5
Kansas City	5–13	8–10	4–14	9–8	6–12–1	—	9–9	7–11	4–14	9–9
Los Angeles	10–8	7–11–1	8–10	8–10	4–14	9–9	—	8–9	6–12	10–8
Minnesota	7–11	7–11	9–9–1	8–10	7–11	11–7	9–8	—	4–14	8–9
New York	9–9–1	13–5	12–6	14–4	10–8	14–4	12–6	14–4	—	11–7
Washington	4–14	8–10	5–13	6–12	5–13	9–9	8–10	9–8	7–11	—

=== Opening Day lineup ===
- Luis Aparicio, SS
- Nellie Fox, 2B
- Minnie Miñoso, LF
- Roy Sievers, 1B
- J. C. Martin, 3B
- Al Smith, RF
- Jim Landis, CF
- Sherm Lollar, C
- Early Wynn, P

=== Notable transactions ===
- May 10, 1961: Wes Covington was selected off waivers by the Chicago White Sox from the Milwaukee Braves.
- May 15, 1961: Joe Ginsberg was released by the White Sox.
- June 1, 1961: Warren Hacker was purchased by the White Sox from the Philadelphia Phillies.
- June 10, 1961: Wes Covington, Stan Johnson, Bob Shaw, and Gerry Staley were traded by the White Sox to the Kansas City Athletics for Ray Herbert, Don Larsen, Andy Carey, and Al Pilarcik.

=== Roster ===
1961 Chicago White Sox
Roster
Pitchers: 38 Frank Baumann; 46 Alan Brice; 36 Mike DeGerick; 28 Warren Hacker; 21,23 Ray Herbert; 20 Joe Horlen; 44 Russ Kemmerer; 26 Don Larsen; 27 Turk Lown; 15 Cal McLish; 23 Gary Peters; 19 Billy Pierce; 32 Juan Pizarro; 18 Herb Score; 35 Bob Shaw; 21 Jerry Staley; 24 Early Wynn	Catchers: 45 Cam Carreon; 28 Joe Ginsberg; 10 Sherm Lollar; 31 Bob Roselli; Infielders: 11 Luis Aparicio; 7 Andy Carey; 14 Sammy Esposito; 2 Nellie Fox; 6 Billy Goodman; 36 Ted Lepcio; 12 J. C. Martin; 5 Roy Sievers; 16 Al Smith; 17 Earl Torgeson	Outfielders: 26 Wes Covington; 40 Mike Hershberger; 1 Jim Landis; 30 Dean Look; 9 Minnie Miñoso; 29 Al Pilarcik; 3 Floyd Robinson; Other batters: 7 Jim Rivera	Manager: 42 Al López; Coaches: 37 Ray Berres; 34 Johnny Cooney; 33 Tony Cuccinello; 39 Don Gutteridge

== Player stats ==
= Indicates team leader

= Indicates league leader

=== Batting ===
Note: G = Games played; AB = At bats; R = Runs scored; H = Hits; 2B = Doubles; 3B = Triples; HR = Home runs; RBI = Runs batted in; BB = Base on balls; SO = Strikeouts; AVG = Batting average; SB = Stolen bases

Player	G	AB	R	H	2B	3B	HR	RBI	BB	SO	AVG	SB
Luis Aparicio, SS	156	625	90	170	24	4	6	45	38	33	.272	53
Andy Carey, 3B	56	143	21	38	12	3	0	14	11	24	.266	0
Cam Carreon, C	78	229	32	62	5	1	4	27	21	24	.271	0
Wes Covington, LF, RF	22	59	5	17	1	0	4	15	4	5	.288	0
Sammy Esposito, 3B, SS, 2B	63	94	12	16	5	0	1	8	12	21	.170	0
Nellie Fox, 2B	159	606	67	152	11	5	2	51	59	12	.251	2
Joe Ginsberg, C	6	3	0	0	0	0	0	0	1	2	.000	0
Billy Goodman, 3B	41	51	4	13	4	0	1	10	7	6	.255	0
Mike Hershberger, OF	15	55	9	17	3	0	0	5	2	2	.309	1
Jim Landis, CF	140	534	87	151	18	8	22	85	65	71	.283	19
Ted Lepcio, 3B	5	2	0	0	0	0	0	0	1	0	.000	0
Sherm Lollar, C	116	337	38	95	10	1	7	41	37	22	.282	0
Dean Look, LF	3	6	0	0	0	0	0	0	0	1	.000	0
J. C. Martin, 1B, 3B	110	274	26	63	8	3	5	32	21	31	.230	1
Minnie Miñoso, LF	152	540	91	151	28	3	14	82	67	46	.280	9
Al Pilarcik, CF	47	62	9	11	1	0	1	6	9	5	.177	1
Jim Rivera, PR	1	0	0	0	0	0	0	0	0	0	.000	0
Floyd Robinson, RF	132	432	69	134	20	7	11	59	52	32	.310	7
Bob Roselli, C	22	38	2	10	3	0	0	4	0	11	.263	0
Roy Sievers, 1B	141	492	76	145	26	6	27	92	61	62	.295	1
Al Smith, 3B, OF	147	532	88	148	29	4	28	93	56	67	.278	4
Earl Torgeson, 1B	20	15	1	1	0	0	0	1	3	5	.067	0

Player	G	AB	R	H	2B	3B	HR	RBI	BB	SO	AVG	SB
Frank Baumann, P	55	61	8	16	2	0	2	10	5	25	.262	1
Warren Hacker, P	42	9	0	1	0	0	0	1	0	1	.111	0
Ray Herbert, P	21	53	7	12	1	0	2	3	3	8	.226	0
Joe Horlen, P	5	7	0	0	0	0	0	0	0	2	.000	0
Russ Kemmerer, P	47	15	1	3	1	0	0	1	2	7	.200	0
Don Larsen, P	25	25	2	8	0	0	1	4	0	5	.320	0
Turk Lown, P	60	14	0	0	0	0	0	0	0	5	.000	0
Cal McLish, P	31	54	2	9	1	0	0	5	1	24	.167	0
Gary Peters, P	3	3	1	1	0	0	0	0	0	1	.333	0
Billy Pierce, P	39	56	3	8	0	0	0	3	1	11	.143	0
Juan Pizarro, P	40	69	10	17	3	1	0	5	5	19	.246	1
Herb Score, P	8	6	0	0	0	0	0	0	0	5	.000	0
Bob Shaw, P	14	18	0	0	0	0	0	0	3	6	.000	0
Early Wynn, P	17	37	4	6	0	0	0	2	3	11	.162	0
Team totals	163	5556	765	1475	216	46	138	704	550	612	.265	100

=== Pitching ===
Note: W = Wins; L = Losses; ERA = Earned run average; G = Games pitched; GS = Games started; SV = Saves; IP = Innings pitched; H = Hits allowed; R = Runs allowed; ER = Earned runs allowed; HR = Home runs allowed; BB = Walks allowed; K = Strikeouts

Player	W	L	ERA	G	GS	SV	IP	H	R	ER	HR	BB	K
Frank Baumann	10	13	5.61	53	23	3	187.2	249	128	117	22	63	75
Alan Brice	0	1	0.00	3	0	0	3.1	4	2	0	0	3	3
Mike DeGerick	0	0	5.40	1	0	0	1.2	2	1	1	0	1	0
Warren Hacker	3	3	3.77	42	0	8	57.1	62	26	24	8	9	40
Ray Herbert	9	6	4.05	21	20	0	137.2	142	69	62	15	38	50
Joe Horlen	1	3	6.62	5	4	0	17.2	25	15	13	2	13	11
Russ Kemmerer	3	3	4.38	47	2	2	96.2	102	53	47	10	27	35
Don Larsen	7	2	4.12	25	3	2	74.1	64	36	34	5	31	53
Turk Lown	7	5	2.76	59	0	11	101.0	87	37	31	13	38	50
Cal McLish	10	13	4.38	31	27	1	162.1	178	87	79	21	48	80
Gary Peters	0	0	1.74	3	0	1	10.1	10	2	2	0	2	6
Billy Pierce	10	9	3.80	39	28	3	180.0	190	85	76	17	57	106
Juan Pizarro	14	7	3.05	39	25	2	194.2	164	73	66	17	90	188
Herb Score	1	2	6.66	8	5	0	24.1	22	19	18	3	25	14
Bob Shaw	3	4	3.79	14	10	0	71.1	85	40	30	11	25	31
Gerry Staley	0	3	5.00	16	0	0	18.0	17	10	10	3	6	8
Early Wynn	8	2	3.51	17	16	0	110.1	88	43	43	11	47	64
Team totals	86	76	4.06	163	163	33	1448.2	1491	726	653	158	523	814

== Farm system ==
Level	Team	League	Manager
AAA	San Diego Padres	Pacific Coast League	Jimmie Reese, Whitey Wietelmann and Bill Norman
A	Charleston White Sox	Sally League	Ira Hutchinson
B	Lincoln Chiefs	Illinois–Indiana–Iowa League	George Noga
C	Idaho Falls Russets	Pioneer League	Herman Reich and Chips Sobek
D	Harlan Smokies	Appalachian League	Frank Parenti and Eddie Lyons
D	Daytona Beach Islanders	Florida State League	Homer Ray Wilson
D	Clinton C-Sox	Midwest League	Dick Kinaman

Harlan affiliation shared with New York Yankees
