= 1961 Baltimore Orioles season =

Major League Baseball season

1961 Baltimore Orioles
- League: American League
- Ballpark: Memorial Stadium
- City: Baltimore, Maryland
- Record: 95–67 (.586)
- League place: 3rd
- Owners: Jerold Hoffberger, Joseph Iglehart
- General managers: Lee MacPhail
- Managers: Paul Richards, Lum Harris
- Television: WJZ-TV
- Radio: WBAL (AM) (Bob Murphy, Herb Carneal)

The 1961 Baltimore Orioles season involved the Orioles finishing third in the American League with a record of 95 wins and 67 losses, 14 games behind the AL and World Series champion New York Yankees. The team was managed by Paul Richards and Lum Harris, and played their home games at Baltimore's Memorial Stadium.

The 95 wins set a new franchise record for wins in a season, beating the 93 wins by the 1922 St. Louis Browns. It was only the second time that the Orioles, and their previous incarnations as the Milwaukee Brewers and Browns, ever won 90 games in a season.

== Offseason ==
- October 13, 1960: Del Rice was released by the Orioles.
- October 13, 1960: Dave Philley was released by the Orioles.
- January 24, 1961: Bob Boyd, Al Pilarcik, Jim Archer, Wayne Causey, and Clint Courtney were traded by the Orioles to the Kansas City Athletics for Whitey Herzog and Russ Snyder. Clint Courtney was returned to the Orioles on April 14.
- January 31, 1961: Dave Philley was signed as a free agent by the Orioles.
- February 9, 1961: Darold Knowles was signed as an amateur free agent by the Orioles.
- February 24, 1961: Frank House was purchased by the Orioles from the Cincinnati Reds.

== Regular season ==
Roger Maris of the Yankees hit his 59th and 60th home runs of the season against the Orioles, tying what was at the time Babe Ruth's single-season record. The 59th was hit on September 20 at Memorial Stadium, and the 60th was hit on September 26 at Yankee Stadium.

=== Opening Day starters ===
- Jackie Brandt
- Marv Breeding
- Jim Gentile
- Ron Hansen
- Milt Pappas
- Brooks Robinson
- Russ Snyder
- Gene Stephens
- Gus Triandos

=== Season standings ===
American League
Team	W	L	Pct.	GB	Home	Road
New York Yankees	109	53	.673	—	65‍–‍16	44‍–‍37
Detroit Tigers	101	61	.623	8	50‍–‍31	51‍–‍30
Baltimore Orioles	95	67	.586	14	48‍–‍33	47‍–‍34
Chicago White Sox	86	76	.531	23	53‍–‍28	33‍–‍48
Cleveland Indians	78	83	.484	30½	40‍–‍41	38‍–‍42
Boston Red Sox	76	86	.469	33	50‍–‍31	26‍–‍55
Minnesota Twins	70	90	.438	38	36‍–‍44	34‍–‍46
Los Angeles Angels	70	91	.435	38½	46‍–‍36	24‍–‍55
Kansas City Athletics	61	100	.379	47½	33‍–‍47	28‍–‍53
Washington Senators	61	100	.379	47½	33‍–‍46	28‍–‍54

=== Record vs. opponents ===
1961 American League record Sources:
Team	BAL	BOS	CWS	CLE	DET	KCA	LAA	MIN	NYY	WAS
Baltimore	—	11–7	11–7	9–9	9–9	13–5	8–10	11–7	9–9–1	14–4
Boston	7–11	—	9–9	5–13	8–10	10–8	11–7–1	11–7	5–13	10–8
Chicago	7–11	9–9	—	12–6	6–12	14–4	10–8	9–9–1	6–12	13–5
Cleveland	9–9	13–5	6–12	—	6–12	8–9	10–8	10–8	4–14	12–6
Detroit	9–9	10–8	12–6	12–6	—	12–6–1	14–4	11–7	8–10	13–5
Kansas City	5–13	8–10	4–14	9–8	6–12–1	—	9–9	7–11	4–14	9–9
Los Angeles	10–8	7–11–1	8–10	8–10	4–14	9–9	—	8–9	6–12	10–8
Minnesota	7–11	7–11	9–9–1	8–10	7–11	11–7	9–8	—	4–14	8–9
New York	9–9–1	13–5	12–6	14–4	10–8	14–4	12–6	14–4	—	11–7
Washington	4–14	8–10	5–13	6–12	5–13	9–9	8–10	9–8	7–11	—

=== Notable transactions ===
- April 12, 1961: Chuck Essegian and Jerry Walker were traded by the Orioles to the Kansas City Athletics in exchange for Dick Hall and Dick Williams.
- May 24, 1961: Walt Dropo was released by the Orioles.
- June 8, 1961: Gene Stephens was traded by the Orioles to the Kansas City Athletics for Marv Throneberry.
- July 21, 1961: Frank House was traded by the Orioles to the Detroit Tigers for Harry Chiti.

=== Roster ===
1961 Baltimore Orioles
Roster
Pitchers: 13 Steve Barber; 28 Hal Brown; 23 Chuck Estrada; 48 Jack Fisher; 38,29 Dick Hall; 20 Billy Hoeft; 38 Dick Hyde; 19 Gordon Jones; 39 Jim Lehew; 39 John Papa; 32 Milt Pappas; 18 Wes Stock; 15 Hoyt Wilhelm	Catchers: 2 Clint Courtney; 36 Hank Foiles; 44 Charley Lau; 11 Gus Triandos; 42 Frank Zupo; Infielders: 7 Jerry Adair; 1 Marv Breeding; 17 Walt Dropo; 4 Jim Gentile; 3 Ron Hansen; 5 Brooks Robinson	Outfielders: 25 Jackie Brandt; 16 Jim Busby; 6,27 Whitey Herzog; 22 Dave Philley; 30 Boog Powell; 14 Earl Robinson; 40 Barry Shetrone; 9 Russ Snyder; 8 Gene Stephens; 8 Marv Throneberry; 10 Dick Williams; Other batters: 10 Chuck Essegian	Manager: 12 Paul Richards; 26 Lum Harris; Coaches: 45 Jimmy Adair; 31 Harry Brecheen; 26 Lum Harris

== Player stats ==
= Indicates team leader

= Indicates league leader

=== Batting ===
==== Starters by position ====
Note: Pos = Position; G = Games played; AB = At bats; H = Hits; Avg. = Batting average; HR = Home runs; RBI = Runs batted in

Pos	Player	G	AB	H	Avg.	HR	RBI
C	Gus Triandos	115	397	97	.244	17	63
1B	Jim Gentile	148	486	147	.302	46	141
2B	Jerry Adair	133	386	102	.264	9	37
3B	Brooks Robinson	163	668	192	.287	7	61
SS	Ron Hansen	155	533	132	.248	12	51
LF	Dick Williams	103	310	64	.206	8	24
CF	Jackie Brandt	139	516	153	.297	16	72
RF	Whitey Herzog	113	323	94	.291	5	35

==== Other batters ====
Note: G = Games played; AB = At bats; H = Hits; Avg. = Batting average; HR = Home runs; RBI = Runs batted in

Player	G	AB	H	Avg.	HR	RBI
Russ Snyder	115	312	91	.292	1	13
Marv Breeding	90	244	51	.209	1	16
Earl Robinson	96	222	59	.266	8	30
Dave Philley	99	144	36	.250	1	23
Hank Foiles	43	124	34	.274	6	19
Marv Throneberry	56	96	20	.208	5	11
Jim Busby	75	89	23	.258	0	6
Gene Stephens	32	58	11	.190	0	2
Charley Lau	17	47	8	.170	1	4
Clint Courtney	22	45	12	.267	0	4
Walt Dropo	14	27	7	.259	1	2
Boog Powell	4	13	1	.077	0	1
Barry Shetrone	3	7	1	.143	0	1
Frank Zupo	5	4	2	.500	0	0
Chuck Essegian	1	1	0	.000	0	0

=== Pitching ===
==== Starting pitchers ====
Note: G = Games pitched; IP = Innings pitched; W = Wins; L = Losses; ERA = Earned run average; SO = Strikeouts

Player	G	IP	W	L	ERA	SO
Steve Barber	37	248.1	18	12	3.33	150
Chuck Estrada	33	212.0	15	9	3.69	160
Jack Fisher	36	196.0	10	13	3.90	118
Milt Pappas	26	177.2	13	9	3.04	89
Hal Brown	27	166.2	10	6	3.19	61

==== Other pitchers ====
Note: G = Games pitched; IP = Innings pitched; W = Wins; L = Losses; ERA = Earned run average; SO = Strikeouts

Player	G	IP	W	L	ERA	SO
Billy Hoeft	35	138.0	7	4	2.02	100
Dick Hall	29	122.1	7	5	3.09	92

==== Relief pitchers ====
Note: G = Games pitched; W = Wins; L = Losses; SV = Saves; ERA = Earned run average; SO = Strikeouts

Player	G	W	L	SV	ERA	SO
Hoyt Wilhelm	51	9	7	18	2.30	87
Wes Stock	35	5	0	3	3.01	47
Dick Hyde	15	1	2	0	5.57	15
Gordon Jones	3	0	0	1	5.40	4
Jim Lehew	2	0	0	0	0.00	0
John Papa	2	0	0	0	18.00	3

== Farm system ==
Level	Team	League	Manager
AAA	Rochester Red Wings	International League	Clyde King
AA	Little Rock Travelers	Southern Association	Fred Hatfield
AA	Victoria/Ardmore Rosebuds	Texas League	George Staller
B	Tri-City Braves	Northwest League	Whitey McDowell and Billy DeMars
B	Fox Cities Foxes	Illinois–Indiana–Iowa League	Earl Weaver
C	Stockton Ports	California League	Harry Dunlop
C	Aberdeen Pheasants	Northern League	Lou Fitzgerald
D	Bluefield Orioles	Appalachian League	Dee Phillips, Walter Youse, Joe Cusick and Bud Bates
D	Leesburg Orioles	Florida State League	Billy DeMars, Cal Ripken Sr. and Ray Scarborough

LEAGUE CHAMPIONS: Aberdeen
Victoria club moved to Ardmore, May 27, 1961
