= 1961 Detroit Tigers season =

Major League Baseball season

1961 Detroit Tigers
- League: American League
- Ballpark: Tiger Stadium
- City: Detroit, Michigan
- Record: 101–61 (.623)
- League place: 2nd
- Owners: John Fetzer
- General managers: Rick Ferrell
- Managers: Bob Scheffing
- Television: WJBK
- Radio: WKMH; WWJ; WJR (George Kell, Ernie Harwell)

The 1961 Detroit Tigers won 101 games but finished in second place, eight games behind the Yankees. The team's 1961 record tied the 1934 Tigers team record of 101 wins, and only twice in team history have the Tigers won more games: 1968 (103 wins) and 1984 (104 wins).

== Offseason ==
On January 1, the Tigers' home park, Briggs Stadium, was renamed Tiger Stadium.

=== Notable transactions ===
- December 14, 1960: 1960 MLB expansion draft
  - Steve Bilko was drafted from the Tigers by the Los Angeles Angels.
  - Coot Veal was drafted from the Tigers by the Washington Senators.

== Regular season ==
The 1961 Tigers were led by Norm Cash, Rocky Colavito, and Al Kaline. Cash won the AL batting title with a .361 batting average, and had 132 RBIs, and Colavito hit 45 home runs and had 140 RBIs. Kaline led the AL with 41 doubles and finished second to Cash for the batting title with a .324 average. Frank Lary led the pitching staff with 23 wins. The 1961 Tigers' winning percentage ranks as the 6th best in team history.

=== The players ===
==== Catchers: Brown and Roarke ====
Catcher Dick Brown hit 16 home runs in 1961, including back-to-back-to-back home runs with Norm Cash and Steve Boros on May 23, 1961. He hit a grand slam less than one month earlier on April 29, 1961.

Brown shared catching duties with rookie Mike Roarke who played in 86 games and hit .223 with 2 home runs and 22 RBIs. Roarke was a 30-year-old rookie in 1961. Roarke graduated from Boston College in 1952 where he was captain of the football and baseball teams in his senior season.

Brown appeared in 91 games at catcher in 1961, and Roarke in 85.

==== Infield: Cash, Wood, Fernández and Boros ====
First baseman Norm Cash won the AL batting crown with a .361 average and also led the league with a .488 on-base percentage and 193 hits. He was also among the league leaders with 41 home runs (6th in the AL), 132 RBIs (4th in the AL), 119 runs scored (4th in the AL), 124 walks (2nd in the AL), 354 total bases (2nd in the AL), and a .662 slugging average (2nd in the AL). He also led the AL in putouts in 1961. While Cash's performance was overshadowed by the 61 home runs of Roger Maris, his .361 average would be the highest by any major league player in the 1960s. Cash was 4th in the MVP voting.

Shortstop Chico Fernández was Detroit's regular shortstop for three seasons from 1960 to 1962. In 1960, he led American League shortstops with 34 errors. After six seasons in which he never hit more than 6 home runs, Fernández hit 20 home runs and 59 RBIs for the Tigers in 1962.

Second baseman Jake Wood was the Tigers' starting second baseman from 1961 to 1963. 1961 was his rookie season, and he led the AL in triples with 14 and in strikeouts with 141. He was also third in the AL in stolen bases with 30.

Third baseman Steve Boros signed a bonus contract with the Detroit Tigers in 1957. He was named the most valuable player of the Class AAA American Association in 1960 after he tied for the lead in runs batted in with 119. In his first full MLB season, 1961, Boros appeared in 116 games for the Tigers as a third baseman and hit .270 with 62 runs batted in. His season was cut short when he collided with Frank Lary and broke his collarbone.

==== Outfield: Colavito, Bruton and Kaline ====
Left fielder Rocky Colavito came to the Tigers in 1960 in a trade for Harvey Kuenn, who had won the 1959 batting title. The trade proved to be a good one for the Tigers. In 1961 with the Tigers, Colavito enjoyed career highs of 45 home runs, 140 RBI and 129 runs scored as the team led the major leagues in scoring. Colavito placed eighth in the MVP race, but Tiger fans didn't take to him. Sportswriter Joe Falls, who viewed Colavito as a "self-ordained deity, started a feature chronicling the runs he failed to drive in. In one game, Falls – acting as the official scorer – charged Colavito with a controversial error, and the outfielder tried to attack him. And on May 12, 1961, he was ejected from the game after climbing into the stands to go after a drunken fan who had been harassing his wife and father. After his excellent 1961 season, he drew the local fans' criticism by holding out for a higher salary than established team star Al Kaline. He was traded to the Athletics after the 1963 season.

Center fielder Bill Bruton put in a strong performance as the Tigers' center fielder. His range factor of 2.67 was far above the league average of 1.98. Bruton played in 160 games for the 1961 Tigers, scored 99 runs, collected 153 hits, and had 17 home runs, 63 RBIs, 22 stolen bases and a .257 batting average.

Right fielder Al Kaline finished second in the AL with a .324 batting average and led the league with 41 doubles. Kaline also had 19 home runs, 82 RBIs, 116 runs scored, finished 9th in the AL MVP voting, and won a Gold Glove award for his fine performance in right field.

==== Pitching: Lary, Bunning, Mossi, Foytack and Regan ====
Frank Lary was 23–9 in 1961, leading the team in wins and finishing second in the AL behind Whitey Ford. He also won a Gold Glove award in 1961, led the AL with 22 complete games, threw a one-hitter, appeared in the All Star Game, finished 7th in the AL MVP voting, was 3rd in the AL Cy Young voting. Known as "The Yankee Killer", Lary had a career record of 27–13 against the Yankees, including a 13–1 run from 1958 to 1959.

Future Hall of Famer Jim Bunning went 17–11 for the Tigers in 38 games in 1961. He was chosen for the AL All-Star team and was among the AL leaders with a 3.19 ERA (7th best in AL), 17 wins (4th best in AL), 194 strikeouts (3rd in AL), 12 complete games (4th in AL), and 4 shutouts (3rd in AL).

Don Mossi pitched the greatest season of his career in 1961, going 15–7 with a 2.96 ERA. Nicknamed "The Sphinx" and "Ears", baseball historian Bill James dubbed Mossi "The Man Who Invented Winning Ugly." James wrote: "Mossi's ears looked as if they had been borrowed from a much larger species, and reattached without proper supervision. His nose was crooked, his eyes were in the wrong place, and though he was skinny he had no neck to speak of, just a series of chins that melted into his chest. . . . Don Mossi was the complete five-tool ugly player. He could run ugly, hit ugly, throw ugly, field ugly and ugly for power."

The Tigers #4 starter Paul Foytack played 10 seasons for the Tigers (1953, 1955–63) and is best known for giving up the longest home run in Tigers Stadium history—a 1960 blast by Mickey Mantle that landed in the Brooks lumberyard across Trumbull Avenue from the stadium. In 1961, Foytack was 11–10 with a 3.93 ERA.

Relief pitcher Phil Regan became known as "The Vulture" because of his skill as a closer. In 1961, Regan was 10–7 in 32 games (16 as a starter, 16 in relief). He pitched 120 innings with a 5.25 ERA.

=== Season standings ===
American League
Team	W	L	Pct.	GB	Home	Road
New York Yankees	109	53	.673	—	65‍–‍16	44‍–‍37
Detroit Tigers	101	61	.623	8	50‍–‍31	51‍–‍30
Baltimore Orioles	95	67	.586	14	48‍–‍33	47‍–‍34
Chicago White Sox	86	76	.531	23	53‍–‍28	33‍–‍48
Cleveland Indians	78	83	.484	30½	40‍–‍41	38‍–‍42
Boston Red Sox	76	86	.469	33	50‍–‍31	26‍–‍55
Minnesota Twins	70	90	.438	38	36‍–‍44	34‍–‍46
Los Angeles Angels	70	91	.435	38½	46‍–‍36	24‍–‍55
Kansas City Athletics	61	100	.379	47½	33‍–‍47	28‍–‍53
Washington Senators	61	100	.379	47½	33‍–‍46	28‍–‍54

=== Record vs. opponents ===
1961 American League record Sources:
Team	BAL	BOS	CWS	CLE	DET	KCA	LAA	MIN	NYY	WAS
Baltimore	—	11–7	11–7	9–9	9–9	13–5	8–10	11–7	9–9–1	14–4
Boston	7–11	—	9–9	5–13	8–10	10–8	11–7–1	11–7	5–13	10–8
Chicago	7–11	9–9	—	12–6	6–12	14–4	10–8	9–9–1	6–12	13–5
Cleveland	9–9	13–5	6–12	—	6–12	8–9	10–8	10–8	4–14	12–6
Detroit	9–9	10–8	12–6	12–6	—	12–6–1	14–4	11–7	8–10	13–5
Kansas City	5–13	8–10	4–14	9–8	6–12–1	—	9–9	7–11	4–14	9–9
Los Angeles	10–8	7–11–1	8–10	8–10	4–14	9–9	—	8–9	6–12	10–8
Minnesota	7–11	7–11	9–9–1	8–10	7–11	11–7	9–8	—	4–14	8–9
New York	9–9–1	13–5	12–6	14–4	10–8	14–4	12–6	14–4	—	11–7
Washington	4–14	8–10	5–13	6–12	5–13	9–9	8–10	9–8	7–11	—

=== Roster ===
1961 Detroit Tigers
Roster
Pitchers: 37 Hank Aguirre; 32 Bob Bruce; 14 Jim Bunning; 19 Jerry Casale; 19 Jim Donohue; 26 Bill Fischer; 18 Terry Fox; 21 Paul Foytack; 11 Fred Gladding; 46 Joe Grzenda; 11 Ron Kline; 45 Howie Koplitz; 17 Frank Lary; 24 Manny Montejo; 15 Don Mossi; 32 Ron Nischwitz; 16 Phil Regan; 20 Gerry Staley; 20 Hal Woodeshick	Catchers: 10 Dick Brown; 11 Harry Chiti; 19 Bill Freehan; 5 Frank House; 12 Mike Roarke; Infielders: 8 Reno Bertoia; 1 Steve Boros; 25 Norm Cash; 3 Chuck Cottier; 9 Chico Fernández; 3 Dick McAuliffe; 28 Bobo Osborne; 8 Ozzie Virgil; 2 Jake Wood	Outfielders: 26 George Alusik; 38 Bill Bruton; 7 Rocky Colavito; 6 Al Kaline; 4 Charlie Maxwell; 40 Bubba Morton; 24 George Thomas; Other batters: 5 Dick Gernert; 22 Vic Wertz	Manager: 27 Bob Scheffing; Coaches: 44 Phil Cavarretta (Third base); 33 Tom Ferrick (Pitching); 31 Don Heffner (First base)

=== Season chronology ===
- April 26: Roger Maris of the New York Yankees hit his first of 61 home runs off Paul Foytack of Detroit‚ and Mickey Mantle added home runs from both sides of the plate‚ as New York won 13–10 at Tiger Stadium. Mantle's 2nd homer‚ a 2-run shot off Hank Aguirre‚ broke a 10–10 tie in the 10th.
- April 30: Jim Gentile‚ Gus Triandos‚ and Ron Hansen hit consecutive home runs in the 7th inning for the Orioles‚ as they beat Detroit 4–2 to split a double header. The Tigers won the opener‚ 8–2‚ after going scoreless in 6 innings against Steve Barber.
- May 12: Tigers win in the 9th on Frank Lary's home run. It was Lary's 25th career win over the Yankees against just 8 losses. Lary was known as the "Yankee Killer."
- May 13: Rocky Colavito goes 4-for-5‚ including two home runs. The Tigers won‚ 8–3.
- May 14: The Yankees won a pair from Detroit‚ taking the opener with Jim Coates pitching the 11th inning for the win. Coates pitched another 5 innings of relief to win the nightcap as well.
- May 23: Norm Cash‚ Steve Boros‚ and Dick Brown hit consecutive home runs for the Tigers in a 5–2 win over Minnesota.
- June 11: Norm Cash became the first Detroit Tiger to hit a ball out of Tiger Stadium. Cash hit the ball over Tiger Stadium's right field roof four times in his career.
- June 16: Detroit's Phil Regan beat New York 4–2 at home‚ as the Tigers took first place.
- June 17: With 2 out and 2 on in the 9th‚ Mickey Mantle homered off Paul Foytack into the right field upper deck. Elston Howard followed with a home run‚ but Detroit hung on to win 12–10 over the 3rd-place Yanks.
- June 20: Al Kaline played third base for the first time in his career. His 2 hits and 2 RBIs led the Tigers to a 5–4 win over the Senators. Kaline returned to the outfield and played third base just once more in his career‚ in 1965.
- July 9: The Tigers took over 1st place with a doubleheader sweep of the Angels. Frank Lary's 13th victory in the opener‚ a 1–0 three-hitter‚ was followed by Jim Bunning's 6–3 win in the nightcap.
- July 21: Harry Chiti was traded by the Tigers to the Baltimore Orioles for Frank House.
- July 23: Using 21 pitchers‚ the Tigers (11) and A's (10) set an AL record for most pitchers used in an 18-inning doubleheader. At 3 hours‚ 54 minutes‚ the second game was the longest 9-inning contest in AL history. The entire doubleheader lasted 6 hours‚ 50 minutes‚ a major league record. The Tigers swept the A's 6–4 and 17–14‚ taking first place by one percentage point.
- July 24: At Kansas City‚ Frank Lary collided with rookie third baseman Steve Boros‚ and both players left the game with injuries. Boros broke his collarbone, and he would not return. He had 53 RBIs to date. The Tigers were in first place, one game ahead of the Yankees, when they lost Boros for the season.
- July 25: The Yankees moved into first place, where they remained for the rest of the season.
- July 31: The second All-Star Game of 1961 ended in a 1–1 tie at Fenway Park. Rocky Colavito homered for the AL run. Heavy rains ended the exhibition after 9 innings.
- August 2: Bill Fischer and Ozzie Virgil were traded by the Tigers to the Kansas City Athletics for Gerry Staley and Reno Bertoia.
- August 7: Willie Horton was signed as an amateur free agent by the Tigers.
- August 18: Ron Kline‚ purchased from the Angels on August 10‚ blanked the Red Sox on 4 hits to give the Tigers a 5–0 win. Bill Monbouquette lasted just 4 innings and gave up home runs to Bill Bruton and Rocky Colavito.
- August 19: The Red Sox beat the Tigers‚ 5–3‚ as the two teams combined to hit into 8 double plays‚ tying the major league record for 9 innings.
- August 25: Jim Bunning (15–9) allowed just 2 hits while blanking the Senators‚ 6–0‚ in a game called after 8 innings because of rain.
- August 27: Detroit's Rocky Colavito tied an AL record with 4 home runs—three in the 2nd game‚ in a doubleheader sweep of the Senators, 7–4 and 10–1 at Washington.
- August 28: At Washington‚ Rocky Colavito and Al Kaline hit 1st-inning home runs. Detroit won‚ 7–3, and cut New York's lead to 1 1/2 games. Jake Wood hit a 6th inning grand slam for Detroit.
- August 31: The Tigers (86–47) headed into the final month of the season in second place, 1 1/2 games behind the Yankees (87–45) heading into the final month.
- September 1: The AL's biggest crowd of the year‚ 65‚566‚ watched Whitey Ford and Don Mossi in a pitching duel at Yankee Stadium as a weekend battle for first place began. Two-out‚ 9th-inning hits by Elston Howard‚ Yogi Berra‚ and Bill Skowron gave New York a 1–0 win. The Yankees extended their lead to 2 1/2 games.
- September 2: In the second game of the showdown between the Tigers and Yankees, the Yankees beat Detroit's ace, Frank Lary‚ 7–3. Roger Maris hit two home runs, and Elston Howard added a three-run homer. The Yankees extended their lead to 3 1/2 games.
- September 3: The Tigers lost the third game of the weekend series to the Yankees. The Tigers led 5–4 in the 9th when Mickey Mantle tied the game with his second homer of the day. Elston Howard won it with a three-run home run. Detroit entered the series 1 1/2 games behind the Yankees, but left trailing by 4 1/2 games. Mantle's home run was his 50th of the year, three short of Maris's 53 homers.
- September 4: The Yankees swept a Labor Day double header against the Senators‚ and moved 6 games up ahead of the slumping Tigers‚ who were swept by the Orioles in a double header.
- September 5: The Tigers lost a double header for their sixth straight loss, while the Yankees beat Washington. The Yankees won 6 straight while the Tigers lost 6 straight. The 1 1/2 game lead had grown to 7 1/2 games.
- September 8: The Yankees beat the Indians 9–1 for their 9th straight while Detroit lost their 8th in a row to drop 10 games out of first place. The Tigers purchased Vic Wertz from the Red Sox to add more power to the offense.
- September 12: Detroit ace Frank Lary halted the Tigers' skid with a complete game, 5-hitter, as Detroit beat Kansas City, 3–1. Rookie shortstop Dick McAuliffe went 3-for-4.
- September 13: Jim Bunning shut out the A's, 8–0, for his 16th win, and Rocky Colavito and Norm Cash both hit home runs for Detroit. Tigers second baseman Jake Wood also hit his AL-leading 12th triple.
- September 15: The Tigers and Yankees split a doubleheader in Detroit‚ with New York winning the opener 11–1 and Detroit taking the second game 4–2. Whitey Ford logged his 23rd win in the opener. In the second game, Ron Kline pitched a complete game 7-hitter, for a 4–2 win. Norm Cash and Steve Boros hit home runs to support Kline.
- September 16: Frank Lary pitched a complete game in a 10–4 win over the Yankees. Roger Maris hit his 57th home run, but the Tigers scored 10 times. Al Kaline was 4-for-4 with 2 RBIs, and Norm Cash was 2-for-4 with a home run and 4 RBIs. Cash and Kaline would finish #1 and #2 in the 1961 AL batting race.
- September 17: In Detroit‚ Roger Maris tripled off Jim Bunning in the 7th inning to put the Yankees ahead. Detroit tied it in the 8th inning and then, in the 12th‚ Maris hit his 58th home run after stepping out of the box to watch a long line of Canada geese fly over Tiger Stadium.
- September 24: A dropped fly ball by Ken Hunt in the 10th gave the Tigers 2 runs and a 7–5 win over the Angels. Hunt had tied the game in the 8th with a home run. Al Kaline hit his AL-leading 40th double in a 7th inning pinch-hitting appearance. Rookie Howie Koplitz won his first major league game‚ after going 23–3 with a no hitter for Birmingham. Koplitz won his first 7 decisions in the major leagues over 4 years, but an arm injury limited him to a career record of 9–7.
- September 26: In New York's 159th game‚ Roger Maris hit his 60th home run, as the Yankees beat Baltimore 3–2, with 8‚000 fans on hand in Baltimore.
- September 27: The Tigers won their 98th game at Kansas City, 10–2, as Frank Lary won his 23rd game of the season—second only to New York's Whitey Ford. Norm Cash finished the season with a torrid run, including a home run and 3 RBIs in the win. Rocky Colavito also hit his team high 45th home run.
- September 29: The Tigers won their 99th game, a 6–4 victory over Minnesota. Norm Cash padded his lead in the batting race, as he went 4-for-5, hit his 40th home run, and scored 3 runs.
- September 30: In Minnesota, the Tigers won their 100th game, a 6–4 victory over the Twins.
- October 1: The Tigers won their 101st game, an 8–3 victory over the Twins. Paul Foytack got the win, and rookie catcher Bill Freehan went 2-for-4 with 2 RBIs in his 4th major league game. Norm Cash hit his 41st home run and went 2-for-3 to take the AL batting crown.

== Player stats ==
= Indicates team leader

= Indicates league leader

=== Batting ===
==== Starters by position ====
Note: Pos = Position; G = Games played; AB = At bats; H = Hits; Avg. = Batting average; HR = Home runs; RBI = Runs batted in

Pos	Player	G	AB	H	Avg.	HR	RBI
C	Dick Brown	93	308	82	.266	16	45
1B	Norm Cash	159	535	193	.361	41	132
2B	Jake Wood	162	663	171	.258	11	69
3B	Steve Boros	116	396	107	.270	5	62
SS	Chico Fernández	133	435	108	.248	3	40
LF	Rocky Colavito	163	583	169	.290	45	140
CF	Bill Bruton	160	596	153	.257	17	63
RF	Al Kaline	153	586	190	.324	19	82

==== Other batters ====
Note: G = Games played; AB = At bats; H = Hits; Avg. = Batting average; HR = Home runs; RBI = Runs batted in

Player	G	AB	H	Avg.	HR	RBI
Dick McAuliffe	80	285	73	.256	6	33
Mike Roarke	86	229	51	.223	2	22
Charlie Maxwell	79	131	30	.229	5	18
Bubba Morton	77	108	31	.287	2	19
Bobo Osborne	71	93	20	.215	2	13
Reno Bertoia	24	46	10	.217	1	4
Ozzie Virgil	20	30	4	.133	1	1
Frank House	17	22	5	.227	0	3
George Alusik	15	14	2	.143	0	2
Harry Chiti	5	12	1	.083	0	0
Bill Freehan	4	10	4	.400	0	4
Chuck Cottier	10	7	2	.286	0	1
Vic Wertz	8	6	1	.167	0	1
George Thomas	17	6	0	.000	0	0
Dick Gernert	6	5	1	.200	1	1

Note: pitchers' batting statistics not included

=== Pitching ===
==== Starting pitchers ====
Note: G = Games; IP = Innings pitched; W = Wins; L = Losses; ERA = Earned run average; SO = Strikeouts

Player	G	IP	W	L	ERA	SO
Frank Lary	36	275.1	23	9	3.24	146
Jim Bunning	38	268.0	17	11	3.19	194
Don Mossi	35	240.1	15	7	2.96	137
Ron Kline	10	56.1	5	3	2.72	27

==== Other pitchers ====
Note: G = Games pitched; IP = Innings pitched; W = Wins; L = Losses; ERA = Earned run average; SO = Strikeouts

Player	G	IP	W	L	ERA	SO
Paul Foytack	32	169.2	11	10	3.93	89
Phil Regan	32	120.0	10	7	5.25	46
Bob Bruce	14	44.2	1	2	4.43	25
Hal Woodeshick	12	18.1	1	1	7.85	13
Howie Koplitz	4	12.0	2	0	2.25	9
Jerry Casale	3	12.0	0	0	5.25	6
Ron Nischwitz	6	11.1	0	1	5.56	8

==== Relief pitchers ====
Note: G = Games pitched; W = Wins; L = Losses; SV = Saves; ERA = Earned run average; SO = Strikeouts

Player	G	W	L	SV	ERA	SO
Terry Fox	39	5	2	12	1.41	32
Hank Aguirre	45	4	4	8	3.25	32
Bill Fischer	26	3	2	3	5.01	18
Jim Donohue	14	1	1	1	3.54	20
Gerry Staley	13	1	1	2	3.38	8
Manny Montejo	12	0	0	0	3.86	15
Fred Gladding	8	1	0	0	3.31	11
Joe Grzenda	4	1	0	0	7.94	0

== Awards and honors ==
=== Players ranking among top 100 of all time at position ===
The following members of the 1961 Detroit Tigers are among the Top 100 of all time at their positions, as ranked by The New Bill James Historical Baseball Abstract in 2001:

- Bill Freehan: 12th best catcher of all time (played in only four games for the 1961 Tigers)
- Norm Cash: 20th best first baseman of all time
- Dick McAuliffe: 22nd best second baseman of all time (played in 80 games, none at second base, for the 1961 Tigers)
- Rocky Colavito: 26th best left fielder of all time
- Charlie Maxwell: 99th best left fielder of all time (played in 79 games, only 22 in left field, for the 1961 Tigers)
- Al Kaline: 11th best right fielder of all time
- Jim Bunning: 30th best pitcher of all time

=== League leaders ===
- Norm Cash: AL batting leader (.361)
- Norm Cash: AL hits leader (193)
- Norm Cash: AL on-base percentage leader (.487)
- Norm Cash: AL on-base plus slugging leader (1.148)
- Norm Cash: AL runs created leader (178)
- Norm Cash: AL times on base leader (326)
- Norm Cash: AL intentional walks leader (19)
- Rocky Colavito: AL games played leader (163)
- Al Kaline: AL doubles leader (41)
- Al Kaline: AL Gold Glove award winner
- Frank Lary: AL complete games leader (22)
- Frank Lary: AL Gold Glove award winner
- Don Mossi: AL leader in walks per 9 innings pitched (1.76)
- Don Mossi: AL strikeout to walk ratio leader (2.91)
- Jake Wood: AL triples leader (14)
- Jake Wood: AL strikeouts leader (141)

== Farm system ==
Level	Team	League	Manager
AAA	Denver Bears	American Association	Charlie Metro
AA	Birmingham Barons	Southern Association	Frank Skaff
A	Knoxville Smokies	Sally League	Frank Carswell
B	Durham Bulls	Carolina League	Al Lakeman
C	Duluth–Superior Dukes	Northern League	Bob Swift
D	Montgomery Rebels	Alabama–Florida League	Gail Henley
D	Decatur Commodores	Midwest League	Johnny Groth
D	Jamestown Tigers	New York–Penn League	Al Federoff
