= Joe Pignatano =

American baseball player and coach (1929–2022)

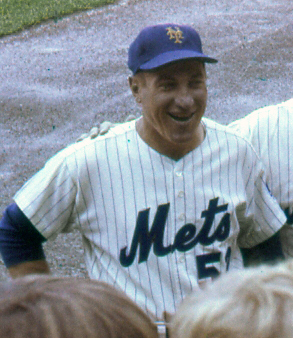
- Pignatano as the Mets' bullpen coach, 1969
- Catcher
- Born: August 4, 1929; Brooklyn, New York, U.S.
- Died: May 23, 2022 (aged 92); Naples, Florida, U.S.
- Batted: Right Threw: Right

MLB debut
- April 28, 1957, for the Brooklyn Dodgers

Last MLB appearance
- September 30, 1962, for the New York Mets

MLB statistics
- Batting average: .234
- Home runs: 16
- Runs batted in: 62
- Stats at Baseball Reference

Teams
- As player: Brooklyn / Los Angeles Dodgers (1957–1960); Kansas City Athletics (1961); San Francisco Giants (1962); New York Mets (1962); As coach: Washington Senators (1965–1968); New York Mets (1968–1981); Atlanta Braves (1982–1984)

Career highlights and awards
- 2× World Series champion (1959, 1969)

Joseph Benjamin Pignatano (August 4, 1929 – May 23, 2022) was an American professional baseball player and coach. As a catcher, Pignatano played in Major League Baseball (MLB) during all or part of six seasons (1957–1962) for the Brooklyn / Los Angeles Dodgers (1957–1960), Kansas City Athletics (1961), San Francisco Giants (1962), and New York Mets (1962). After his playing career, he was a coach for the Mets, Washington Senators, and Atlanta Braves.

Pignatano was a Brooklyn native. He signed with his hometown Dodgers in 1948, and spent almost seven full seasons, interrupted by two years of military service, in their farm system before three brief auditions with the 1957 big-league team. He was a member of the 1959 World Series-champion Dodgers as a player and the 1969 World Series-champion Mets as a coach.

== Early life ==
Pignatano was born on August 4, 1929, in Brooklyn, New York. He attended George Westinghouse Career and Technical Education High School in downtown Brooklyn.

== Playing career ==
Pignatano signed with the Brooklyn Dodgers following a tryout in 1948. On September 24, 1957, Pignatano was behind the plate during the final five innings of the Brooklyn Dodgers' last home game, played at Ebbets Field against the Pittsburgh Pirates. He relieved starting catcher (and future Baseball Hall of Famer) Roy Campanella in the top of the fifth inning with the Dodgers leading 2–0 and helped guide pitcher Danny McDevitt to a complete game shutout victory. The Dodgers moved to Los Angeles during the off-season.

In January 1958, Campanella was paralyzed in a car accident, and John Roseboro succeeded him as the Dodgers' starting catcher. Pignatano was Roseboro's backup in 1958 and 1959, and the third-string Dodger receiver in 1960. He hit a career-high nine home runs in 1958 and played a key role in the Dodgers' late-season 1959 pennant drive, which ended in a flat-footed tie between the Dodgers and Milwaukee Braves. In the flag-clinching Game 2 of the National League playoff series, Pignatano entered the contest as a pinch runner for Norm Larker in the ninth inning, then took over as catcher in the tenth, replacing Roseboro. In the 12th, with two outs and Gil Hodges on base, Pignatano singled off Bob Rush to keep the inning alive and send Hodges to second. The next hitter, Carl Furillo, delivered the game- and pennant-winning run on an infield hit and an error by Braves' shortstop Félix Mantilla. Pignatano then appeared in one inning as a defensive replacement (in Game 5) of the 1959 World Series and earned a world championship ring when the Dodgers prevailed over the Chicago White Sox in six games.

Pignatano joined the Kansas City Athletics for the 1961 season, in a trade that was partly motivated by the Dodgers' need for cash to complete the construction of Dodger Stadium. He was a semi-regular for the 1961 Athletics, splitting the catching duties with Haywood Sullivan, but offensive struggles limited his MLB playing time. Pignatano played in seven games for the San Francisco Giants in 1962 before he was sold to the New York Mets. For his career, Pignatano hit above .240 only once (with the 1961 Athletics) and batted .234 lifetime with 161 hits, 25 doubles, four triples, 16 home runs, and 62 runs batted in. His career OPS was .683. He is the only major league player to have ended his career by hitting into a triple play, which he did while playing for the Mets in the eighth inning on September 30, 1962.

== As a coach ==
After his 15-year professional playing career ended in 1964, Pignatano was a coach for the Washington Senators (1965–1967), New York Mets (1968–1981), and Atlanta Braves (1982–1984), working under Gil Hodges from 1965 to 1971 and earning a second World Series ring with the 1969 "Miracle Mets." During his years as the Mets' bullpen coach, Pignatano cultivated a vegetable garden in the bullpen, and was often out on the field during batting practice engaging with the young Mets fans.

== Personal life ==
Pignatano resided in Southwest Florida. He was married for 66 years to his wife Nancy. Together, they had two children, Neil and Frank, and two grandchildren. Nancy Pignatano died on May 14, 2020, at the age of 86. Joe Pignatano died of dementia in Naples, Florida, on May 23, 2022, at the age of 92.

Sporting positions
Preceded by Danny O'Connell	Washington Senators first base coach 1965–1967	Succeeded by Nellie Fox
Preceded by Sheriff Robinson	New York Mets bullpen coach 1968–1981	Succeeded by n/a
Preceded by John Sullivan	Atlanta Braves bullpen coach 1982–1984	Succeeded by Brian Snitker
