= Bob Shaw (baseball) =

American baseball player (1933–2010)

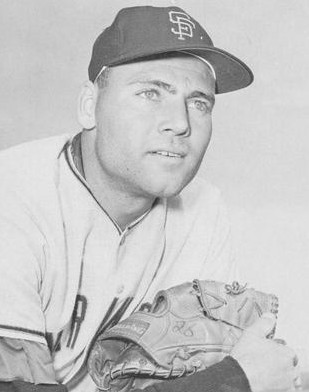
- Pitcher
- Born: June 29, 1933; The Bronx, New York, U.S.
- Died: September 23, 2010 (aged 77); Tequesta, Florida, U.S.
- Batted: Right Threw: Right

MLB debut
- August 11, 1957, for the Detroit Tigers

Last MLB appearance
- September 11, 1967, for the Chicago Cubs

MLB statistics
- Win–loss record: 108–98
- Earned run average: 3.52
- Strikeouts: 880
- Stats at Baseball Reference

Teams
- Detroit Tigers (1957–1958); Chicago White Sox (1958–1961); Kansas City Athletics (1961); Milwaukee Braves (1962–1963); San Francisco Giants (1964–1966); New York Mets (1966–1967); Chicago Cubs (1967)

Career highlights and awards
- All-Star (1962)

Robert John Shaw (June 29, 1933 – September 23, 2010) was an American professional baseball player. A right-handed pitcher, he played in Major League Baseball on seven teams for 11 seasons, from 1957 to 1967. In 1962, he was a National League (NL) All-Star player. In 1966, he led all National League pitchers with a perfect 1.000 fielding percentage.

== Career ==
Shaw made his major league debut with the Detroit Tigers on August 11, 1957. The Tigers traded Shaw and Ray Boone to the Chicago White Sox for Tito Francona and Bill Fischer on June 15, 1958. In 1959, Shaw won 18 games for the American League pennant-winning White Sox. The White Sox faced the Los Angeles Dodgers in the 1959 World Series. Shaw defeated Sandy Koufax with a 1–0 shutout in Game 5, but the Dodgers defeated the White Sox in six games.

The White Sox traded Shaw, Wes Covington, Stan Johnson, and Gerry Staley to the Kansas City Athletics for Andy Carey, Ray Herbert, Don Larsen, and Al Pilarcik. The Athletics traded Shaw and Lou Klimchock to the Milwaukee Braves for Joe Azcue, Ed Charles, and Manny Jiménez on December 15, 1961.

The Braves traded Shaw, Del Crandall, and Bob Hendley to the San Francisco Giants for Felipe Alou, Ed Bailey, Billy Hoeft, and a player to be named later on December 3, 1963. The New York Mets purchased Shaw from the Giants for an undisclosed price above the $20,000 waiver price on June 10, 1966, The Mets sold Shaw to the Chicago Cubs for the waiver price on July 24, 1967. The Cubs released Shaw on September 14.

Shaw holds the major league record for the most balks by a pitcher in one game. He balked five times pitching for the Braves on May 4, 1963, against the Cubs. While he pitched for the Giants in 1964, Shaw taught Gaylord Perry how to throw a spitball, as well as how to hide that he was throwing it from the umpires and opposing team. Perry revealed this in his 1974 autobiography Me and the Spitter.

Shaw became a pitching coach in Minor League Baseball for the Los Angeles Dodgers organization. The Milwaukee Brewers hired Shaw as their pitching coach, for former teammate Del Crandall, on September 15, 1972. Shaw resigned on July 15, 1973, after a dispute with Brewers general manager Jim Wilson.

After retiring from Major League Baseball, Shaw remained active in the game by becoming a coach in the American Legion baseball program where he served for many years. In 1986, Shaw coached Jensen Beach Post 126 to the American Legion World Series title.

== Personal life ==
Shaw worked as a realtor in Northern Palm Beach County, becoming the co-owner of a commercial real estate firm in Tequesta, Florida. He worked until becoming sick in May 2010.

Shaw died of liver cancer on September 23, 2010, in Tequesta, where he lived.

Preceded by Wes Stock	Milwaukee Brewers pitching coach 1972–1973	Succeeded by Al Widmar
