= Jake Wood (baseball) =

American baseball player (born 1937)

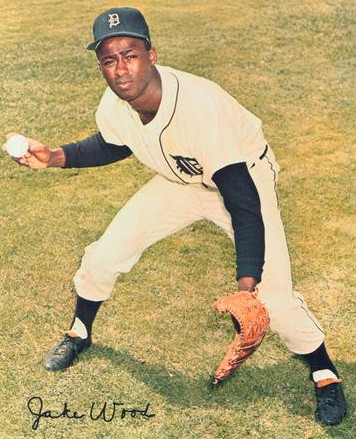
- Wood in 1966
- Second baseman
- Born: June 22, 1937 (age 89); Elizabeth, New Jersey, U.S.
- Batted: Right Threw: Right

MLB debut
- April 11, 1961, for the Detroit Tigers

Last MLB appearance
- August 11, 1967, for the Cincinnati Reds

MLB statistics
- Batting average: .250
- Home runs: 35
- Runs batted in: 168
- Stats at Baseball Reference

Teams
- Detroit Tigers (1961–1967); Cincinnati Reds (1967)

Jacob Wood Jr. (born June 22, 1937) is an American former professional baseball player who appeared in 608 games over seven seasons in Major League Baseball with the Detroit Tigers (1961–1967) and Cincinnati Reds (1967), primarily as a second baseman. He threw and batted right-handed, stood 6 feet 1 inch (1.85 m) tall and weighed 163 pounds (74 kg).

He was born in Elizabeth, New Jersey, the second oldest child and oldest son of nine children of Jacob Sr. and Roberta Wood. Wood grew up in an integrated neighborhood, learned to play stickball and baseball as a youth, and graduated from Thomas Jefferson High School in 1955. He earned a scholarship to Delaware State University in Dover, Delaware, and he played one season of college ball.

Wood was signed as an amateur free agent by the Tigers in early 1957. He attended Detroit's minor league camp in Lakeland, Florida, worked his way up through the Tigers' system, and batted more than .300 with five teams in the minors. Jake made his major league debut at age 23 on the Tigers' season-opener on April 11, 1961, starting at second base and batting leadoff in a 9–5 home loss to the Cleveland Indians. Facing Indians pitcher Jim Perry for the fourth time in the game during the seventh inning, the hard-hitting Wood collected his first career hit in a big way with a two-run home run that scored Bobo Osborne.

Wood was the first African-American starter developed by Detroit's organization, but when right-handed pitcher Jim Proctor debuted for Detroit on September 14, 1959, he became the first black player developed by the Tigers' system.

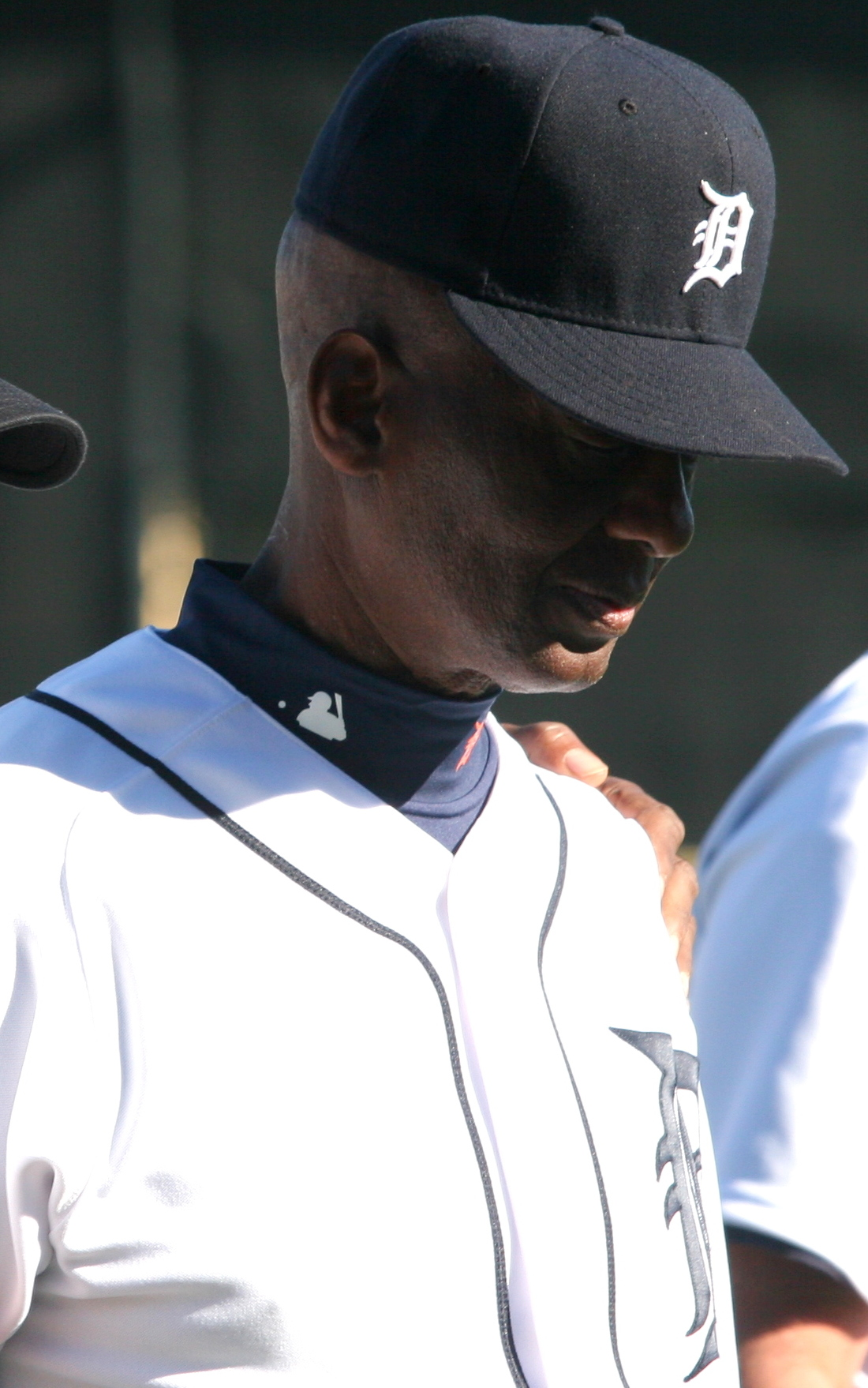
Wood at Detroit Tigers Fantasy Camp in 2012.

Quiet, agile, and talented, Wood remained the Tigers' starting second baseman from 1961 to 1963. He was third in the American League in stolen bases in 1961 (30), 1962 (24), and 1963 (18). During his rookie season in 1961, Wood was also among the American League leaders in runs (96), hits (171), and games (162). He led the AL in triples in 1961 with 14 and in strikeouts with 141—at the time, the record for most strikeouts in a season.

Wood injured a finger late July 1963, and he missed the rest of the season. Starting in 1964, after Detroit acquired veteran second baseman Jerry Lumpe, Wood was a utility infielder and backup second baseman. He remained a reserve for the rest of his career, for example, playing in 98 games and hitting .252 in 1966. On June 23, 1967, during his seventh season with the Tigers, his contract was purchased by the Reds, for whom he played 16 games, with his final major league career appearance coming on August 11, 1967.

Jake ended his major league career with a .250 batting average with 35 home runs, 168 runs batted in and 70 stolen bases.

His brother, Richard Wood, played professional football from 1975 to 1984 with the New York Jets and Tampa Bay Buccaneers.

Jake lives in Pensacola, Florida where, as of 2012, he continued to remain active, playing in over-70 softball leagues and tournaments as well as playing racquetball. He also mentors inmates at the Escambia County, Florida jail as part of the "A Will and a Way" ministry, and he participates in Tigers' reunions, autograph shows, and fantasy camps as well as Negro leagues events.

Wood is a member of the Union County, New Jersey Baseball Hall of Fame.

== See also ==
- List of Major League Baseball annual triples leaders
- SABR Biography by Jim Sargent
