= Wes Covington =

American baseball player (1932–2011)

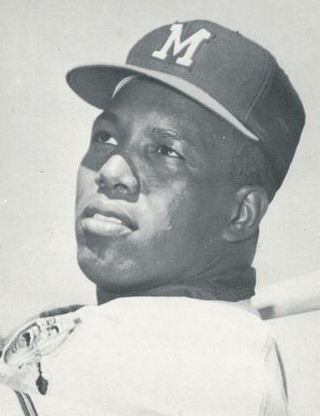
- Left fielder
- Born: March 27, 1932; Laurinburg, North Carolina, U.S.
- Died: July 4, 2011 (aged 79); Edmonton, Alberta, Canada
- Batted: Left Threw: Right

MLB debut
- April 19, 1956, for the Milwaukee Braves

Last MLB appearance
- October 2, 1966, for the Los Angeles Dodgers

MLB statistics
- Batting average: .279
- Home runs: 131
- Runs batted in: 499
- Stats at Baseball Reference

Teams
- Milwaukee Braves (1956–1961); Chicago White Sox (1961); Kansas City Athletics (1961); Philadelphia Phillies (1961–1965); Chicago Cubs (1966); Los Angeles Dodgers (1966)

Career highlights and awards
- World Series champion (1957)

John Wesley Covington (March 27, 1932 – July 4, 2011) was an American professional baseball left fielder, who played in Major League Baseball (MLB) from 1956 through 1966 for the Milwaukee Braves, Chicago White Sox, Kansas City Athletics, Philadelphia Phillies, Chicago Cubs, and Los Angeles Dodgers. He stood 6 ft 1 in (1.85 m), weighing 205 pounds (93 kg; 14.6 st). Covington batted left-handed and threw right-handed.

== Baseball career ==
Born in Laurinburg, North Carolina, Covington attended Laurinburg High School then transferred and graduated from Hillside High School in Durham, where he was a football star. He didn't begin playing baseball until 1950 but his skills caught the eye of Boston Braves scout Dewey Griggs. Covington was offered a contract and assigned to the Class C Eau Claire Bears in 1952. While playing for the Eau Claire Bears, he first met team-mate Hank Aaron Covington roomed with Aaron and catcher Julie Bowers, who had played in the Negro leagues, at the local YMCA that season.

Aaron and Covington became friends that year. Aaron said, “My closest friends on the Eau Claire Bears were (Wes) Covington and especially Julie Bowers. I often wonder what happened to Bowers … I haven’t heard from since 1952.”

In 1957, Covington again found himself in the minors playing for the Wichita Braves. Braves had elected to go with Bobby Thomson. Covington was not happy about this development and when he tried to find out why he was demoted he got the run-around from management. He was finally called up after the Braves had traded Thomson away to the New York Giants with Ray Crone and Danny O'Connell for Red Schoendienst. Covington's return sparked the 1957 Braves down the stretch and helped them win the World Series. Covington hit .284, with 21 home runs, and drove in 65 runs, in just 96 games over the second half of the 1957 season.

Covington's defensive play in the 1957 World Series was stellar. His two breathtaking catches in left field in game 2 and in game 5 helped to preserve victories for the Braves and pitcher Lew Burdette. Covington hit .208 for the series with 6 strikeouts and stole a base.

In 1958 Covington had career-high numbers when he hit .330 with 24 home runs with 74 RBIs in 90 games. In a game on May 31, 1958, against the Pittsburgh Pirates, against starter Ron Kline, Aaron, Mathews and Covington hit back to back to back home runs in the first inning in a game the Braves won 8–5.

Once again the Braves went to the World Series where they again met the Yankees, only to lose the series in 7 games. Covington played in all 7 games and hit 269 with no home runs and 4 RBIs.

Covington first started having problems with his knees in 1958 when he slide into 2nd base in spring training game and was out of action until May 2. On August 20, 1959, he tore an ankle ligament and missed the remainder of the regular season.

In 1961, he reported to camp out-of-shape and held out before the season. The Braves placed Covington on waivers after appearing in 9 games. By this time, he had developed bad knees which would hamper his playing time for the remainder of his career. The Chicago White Sox signed him on May 10. He played 22 games for them, driving in 15 runs, with 4 home runs, and a .288 batting average. On June 10, he was traded along with Stan Johnson, Bob Shaw and Gerry Staley to the Kansas City Athletics for Andy Carey, Ray Herbert, Don Larsen and Al Pilarcik on June 10.

From 1961 until 1965, Covington found a home with the Philadelphia Phillies as a part-time outfielder and pinch-hitter. His five years with the Phillies saw his number almost match those with the Braves. He batted .284, with 61 home runs and 237 RBIs with the team.

The Phillies were the last National League team to integrate. In 1957 the team hired its first black ballplayer - 30 year-old shortstop, John Kennedy. Kennedy played a total of 5 games for the Phillies before he was shipped back to the minors. When Covington joined, he became the first African-American to play a major role with the team. His five years with the Phillies saw his numbers almost match those he had with the Braves.

In an 11-year career, Covington was a .279 hitter, with 131 homers, and 499 runs batted in, a .337 on-base percentage, and a .466 slugging percentage, in 1,075 games. His best season came in 1958, when he posted career numbers in average (.330), home runs (24), and RBI (74).

Although batting only .216 (56-for-259) as a pinch hitter in his MLB career, Covington hit 7 home runs along with 50 RBI in that role.

After his knee injuries, Covington had the reputation of being a poor fielder and a slow runner. He said about this, "What someone else says about me being a bad outfielder doesn't bother me. I've heard it all before. They don't pay outfielders for what they do with the glove."

Covington ended his Major League career in 1966 with the Los Angeles Dodgers. He had started the season as a member of Chicago Cubs. On May 11, the team released him.

On May 28, 1966, he signed as a Free Agent with the Dodgers. The Dodgers went on to the World Series that year where they lost in four games to the Baltimore Orioles. Covington appeared in his last World Series game, as a pinch-hitter, batting for relief pitcher Bob Miller in game 1, striking out. After the season the Dodgers released him.

== Retirement ==
Following his baseball career, Covington moved to Edmonton, Alberta, Canada. For a time, he operated a sporting goods business. Covington contracted cancer, dying in Edmonton on July 4, 2011, at the age of 79.
