= Frank Cipriani =

American baseball player (1941–2022)

- Outfielder
- Born: April 14, 1941; Buffalo, New York, U.S.
- Died: June 7, 2022 (aged 81); West Seneca, New York, U.S.
- Batted: Right Threw: Right

MLB debut
- September 8, 1961, for the Kansas City Athletics

Last MLB appearance
- October 1, 1961, for the Kansas City Athletics

MLB statistics
- Batting average: .250
- Home runs: 0
- Runs batted in: 2
- Stats at Baseball Reference

Teams
- Kansas City Athletics (1961)

Frank Dominick Cipriani (April 14, 1941 – June 7, 2022) was an American professional baseball outfielder whose career extended from 1960 through 1966. He appeared in Major League Baseball for 13 games as a right fielder and pinch hitter for the Kansas City Athletics in 1961. Listed at 6 feet (1.83 m) tall and 180 pounds (82 kg), Cipriani batted and threw right-handed. He was born in Buffalo, New York, and was an alumnus of Fordham University.

Cipriani's September 1961 MLB audition came in his sophomore year as a pro, after he had spent the minor-league season with the Shreveport Sports of the Double-A Southern Association. In his debut for the Athletics, he started in right field against Jim Kaat of the Minnesota Twins, and singled twice off Kaat in a 6–4 Kansas City win. He started in right field in ten more games through October 1 in his only MLB service.

As a big leaguer, Cipriani posted a .250 batting average (9-for-36) with two runs and two RBI in 20 games, without extrabases or stolen bases.

Cipriani died June 7, 2022.

== See also ==
- 1961 Kansas City Athletics season
