= Bill Kirk =

American baseball player (1934-2009)

- Pitcher
- Born: July 19, 1934; Coatesville, Pennsylvania, U.S.
- Died: October 26, 2009 (aged 75); Lititz, Pennsylvania, U.S.
- Batted: Left Threw: Left

MLB debut
- September 23, 1961, for the Kansas City Athletics

Last MLB appearance
- September 23, 1961, for the Kansas City Athletics

MLB statistics
- Win–loss record: 0–0
- Earned run average: 12.00
- Innings pitched: 3
- Stats at Baseball Reference

Teams
- Kansas City Athletics (1961)

William Partlemore Kirk (July 19, 1934 – October 26, 2009) was an American professional baseball player. His career extended from 1954–1956 and 1959–1964, but the 6 ft (1.8 m), 160 lb (73 kg) left-handed pitcher made only one Major League appearance for the Kansas City Athletics during the 1961 season.

Kirk signed a Major League contract with the Philadelphia Athletics in 1954. That year, he registered a 12–9 record with a 3.32 ERA for Class D Welch Miners. Kirk stayed with the Athletics when the team moved to Kansas City in 1955, pitching for six minor league teams before being promoted to the majors late in the 1961 season. While playing for Class-A Lancaster Red Roses, he had pitched a no-hitter at Stumpf Field in July 1960.

Kirk's lone MLB appearance came as a starting pitcher on September 23, 1961, facing the visiting Cleveland Indians at Municipal Stadium. He gave up four earned runs on six hits and a walk, while striking out three in three innings of work, giving up home runs to Chuck Essegian and Johnny Romano. Kirk did not take the loss (that went to Dave Wickersham in a 9–5 Cleveland triumph), but never appeared in a major league game again.

In 1964, Kirk pitched and coached for Class-A York White Roses. It was his last baseball venture in a career that spanned 11 years.

Following his playing career, Kirk worked as an advertising and marketing executive. Bill Kirk died in Lititz, Pennsylvania, at the age of 75.
