= Alan Brice =

American baseball player (1937–2016)

- Relief pitcher
- Born: October 1, 1937; New York City, New York, U.S.
- Died: July 30, 2016 (aged 78); Bradenton, Florida, U.S.
- Batted: Right Threw: Right

MLB debut
- September 22, 1961, for the Chicago White Sox

Last MLB appearance
- September 27, 1961, for the Chicago White Sox

MLB statistics
- Win–loss record: 0–1
- Earned run average: 0.00
- Strikeouts/Walks: 3/3
- Innings pitched: 3 1/3
- Games pitched: 3
- Stats at Baseball Reference

Teams
- Chicago White Sox (1961)

Alan Healey Brice (October 1, 1937 – July 30, 2016) was an American pitcher in Major League Baseball who played for the Chicago White Sox in its 1961 season.
