= Steve Boros =

American baseball player (1936–2010)

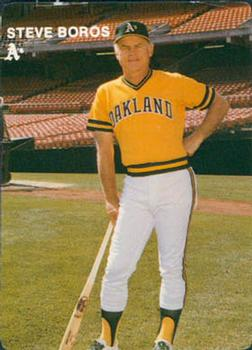
- Boros with Oakland, c. 1984
- Third baseman / Manager
- Born: September 3, 1936; Flint, Michigan, U.S.
- Died: December 29, 2010 (aged 74); DeLand, Florida, U.S.
- Batted: Right Threw: Right

MLB debut
- June 19, 1957, for the Detroit Tigers

Last MLB appearance
- May 8, 1965, for the Cincinnati Reds

MLB statistics
- Batting average: .245
- Home runs: 26
- Runs batted in: 149
- Managerial record: 168–200
- Winning %: .457
- Stats at Baseball Reference

Teams
- As player: Detroit Tigers (1957–1958, 1961–1962); Chicago Cubs (1963); Cincinnati Reds (1964–1965); As manager: Oakland Athletics (1983–1984); San Diego Padres (1986); As coach: Kansas City Royals (1975–1979); Montreal Expos (1981–1982); Kansas City Royals (1993–1994); Baltimore Orioles (1995)

Stephen Boros Jr. (September 3, 1936 – December 29, 2010) was an American professional baseball infielder, coach, manager, scout, and administrator. Best known for his scientific approach to the sport and his use of computers, Boros' baseball career spanned almost 50 years from his debut as a player for the University of Michigan in 1956 to his retirement in 2004 as an executive with the Detroit Tigers of Major League Baseball (MLB).

After playing college baseball for the University of Michigan from 1956 to 1957, Boros signed as a bonus baby with the Detroit Tigers in June 1957. He remained in the Tigers organization from 1957 to 1962. He was the most valuable player in the American Association in 1960 and had his best major league season in 1961 despite missing six weeks with a broken collar bone. During his tenure with the Tigers, Boros was the subject of widespread coverage of his tendency to read history books and fine literature and of his aspiration to become a professor of literature. He finished his major league playing career with the Chicago Cubs and Cincinnati Reds from 1963 to 1965. In 1964, he set a Reds club record with 50 consecutive errorless games at third base. He played a total of 13 years in professional baseball, including stints with several minor league clubs from 1957 to 1969.

In 1970, Boros began a lengthy career as a baseball manager, scout, and coach. While working in the Kansas City Royals farm system, he developed a reputation as a leading advocate of the stolen base. Under his leadership, the San Jose Bees set a modern minor league record with 372 stolen bases in one year. As the first base coach of the Kansas City Royals from 1976 to 1979, he became known for his scientific approach to the stolen base, taking measurements with a stopwatch and maintaining a book on every pitcher and catcher in the American League. The Royals led the league in stolen bases in both 1978 and 1979. As the Montreal Expos' first base coach, he was credited with helping Tim Raines lead the National League in stolen bases in both 1981 and 1982.

In 1983, Boros became the manager of the Oakland Athletics. He drew widespread press coverage after he hired a sabermetrician to track every pitch and feed the data into a mainframe computer in Philadelphia. Boros studied the data on a daily basis using an Apple II computer which he kept in the clubhouse. Boros's cerebral approach to the game drew criticism from baseball traditionalists and resulted in unwanted press coverage for a team that finished in fourth place in 1983. After the A's started the 1984 season with a 20–24 record, and as the press coverage of "Computer Ball" mounted, Boros was fired by the A's in May 1984.

In February 1986, Boros was hired as the manager of the San Diego Padres after the sudden resignation of Dick Williams. The Padres finished in fourth place in 1986, and Boros was fired. Boros spent the next 18 years working as a scout, coach, and front office administrator for the Los Angeles Dodgers, Baltimore Orioles, Kansas City Royals, and Detroit Tigers. His advance scouting of the Oakland A's, and his identification of Dennis Eckersley's tendency to throw a backdoor slider on 3–2 counts to left-handed hitters, was credited with a behind-the-scenes assist in one of the most memorable moments in World Series history—Kirk Gibson's 1988 World Series home run.

== Early years ==
Boros was a native of Flint, Michigan, where his father, Stephen Boros Sr. (1909–1994), and mother, Helen Boros, operated a grocery store. He had one brother and three sisters, David, Barbara (Reehl), Rosemary, and Patricia (Bradshaw). Boros learned to play baseball on the playgrounds of Flint's North End and attended Flint Northern High School. He helped Flint Northern win Saginaw Valley League baseball championships in both 1952 and 1953. He married Sharla and had a son, Stephen, and a daughter, Sasha, who are both married with children.

== University of Michigan ==
He enrolled at the University of Michigan where he received a Bachelor of Arts degree. He played baseball as a shortstop for the Michigan Wolverines baseball team in 1956 and 1957. He had a.324 batting average in 1956 and.381 in 1957. He was selected as an All-Big Ten Conference player in 1957. After an outstanding junior year in 1957, Boros was selected by his teammates as the captain of the 1958 team. However, Boros became the subject of a bonus bidding war among 14 major league teams. He signed in June 1957 with the Detroit Tigers who paid him a $25,000 bonus. Michigan's head coach Ray Fisher was angered at the loss of Boros and told the press: "Major league baseball is a cut-throat game, and they are cutting their own throats as well. Boros told me he didn't intend to sign. He's a good hitter and has power as good as Dick Wakefield's when he connects."

Boros later credited college baseball with having made him a better player: "My last year in high school I hit but.275 and was a terrible fielder. I guess college matured me. I gained some weight and picked up the confidence I lacked in high school. If I hadn't gone to college and had signed right out of high school, I might have had one bad year and quit."

== Baseball player ==
=== Rookie season in Detroit ===
Boros made his major league debut on June 19, 1957, just days after signing his bonus contract with the Tigers. Under the rules in effect at that time, a player receiving a signing bonus was required to be kept on the major league roster for a year, a rule described as "that era's effort to prevent big-revenue teams from stockpiling the best talent." Boros briefly moved into the Tigers starting lineup, replacing a slumping Reno Bertoia at third base. Detroit manager Jack Tighe praised Boros as "a cool customer" with "strong wrists and a quick bat." Boros appeared in 24 games for the 1957 Tigers, including nine at third base and five at shortstop, but hit for only a.146 average.

=== Minor leagues ===
Boros spent most of the 1958 season in the minor leagues, including stints with the Augusta Tigers (South Atlantic League), Birmingham Barons (Southern Association), and Charleston Senators (American Association). He also appeared in six games for the Tigers in 1958, with only two at-bats.

During the 1959 season, Boros spent the entire season with the Birmingham Barons. He appeared in 147 games, beginning the season at third base and then moving into the outfield. By early August, he had earned a reputation as "one of the quickest bats in the league." He compiled a.305 batting average for the Barons with 24 doubles, seven triples, 16 home runs, 85 runs batted in (RBIs), and 23 stolen bases.

Boros spent the 1960 season with the Denver Bears of the Class AAA American Association. He hit home runs in his first and third at bats for Denver and narrowly missed with a towering foul ball in his second at bat. He was named the league's most valuable player while Carl Yastrzemski was named the league's best rookie. He tied for the league lead with 119 RBIs, hit 30 home runs, stole 22 bases, and compiled a.317 batting average, .402 on-base percentage, and.576 slugging percentage.

=== Detroit Tigers ===
Boros spent the full 1961 season with the Detroit Tigers, including 115 games as the team's starting third baseman. As the season got underway, Boros was touted as a "can't miss" star. Joe Falls, who was later inducted into the writers' wing of the Baseball Hall of Fame, wrote:

'Steve Boros can't miss. He's got all the tools. Great hands, great speed, great desire – and watch him swing that bat. He's got everything.' It may be so, too. For this young man up from Denver ... is the most celebrated rookie to move up to the Detroit Tigers since Frank Bolling in 1954.

He got off to a quick start, and by late May, he was batting.341 and "getting as much ink as Roger Maris" who went on to hit 61 home runs for the season. On May 23, 1961, he tied a major league record when Norm Cash, Boros, and Dick Brown hit successive home runs for the Tigers in a game against the Minnesota Twins. A 5-for-55 slump followed, and his batting average dipped to.283 by July. He was hospitalized overnight at Detroit Osteopathic Hospital after being struck behind the left ear and knocked unconscious by an Eli Grba pitch on July 9 at Tiger Stadium. Boros, who was carried off the field on a stretcher, said he never saw the pitch. Detroit manager Bob Scheffing said the batting helmet had saved Boros from a serious injury.

Boros suffered a more serious injury on July 24, 1961, after colliding with pitcher Frank Lary while both were chasing a bunt. Boros suffered a broken left collar bone and missed six weeks as the Tigers fought for the pennant with the New York Yankees. At the time of the injury, the Tigers were in first place in the American League, and Boros already had 53 RBIs, one more than Al Kaline. Boros spent the night at St. Luke's Hospital in Kansas City before flying home to Detroit while the rest of the team flew to the west coast for a road trip. The 1961 Tigers finished with an impressive 101–61 record, but the 1961 Yankees won the pennant with a 109–53 record.

Despite missing six weeks with the collar bone injury, Boros compiled a.270 batting average with a .382 on-base percentage and 62 RBIs. The Sporting News noted that Boros' 63 RBIs in 396 at-bats compared favorably with the league's best third baseman, as Brooks Robinson collected 61 RBIs in 668 at-bats.

In addition to having a solid season at third base, Boros also gained attention as "a book worm who can — and does — read as many as four books at the same time." With plans to return to the University of Michigan in the fall to complete a degree in history, Boros' traveling library during the 1961 season included The History of Russia, Survey of Russia, and Greek and Roman History. Boros told reporter Joe Falls, "I never read just to be entertained. I read to be informed, and my favorite is modern history, if it can be called that — books on Eisenhower and Kennedy and our present-day administration."

During the off-season between the 1961 and 1962 seasons, Boros returned to the University of Michigan seeking to complete the required coursework for his bachelor's degree. Joe Falls quipped that Boros "has learned that hitting the books is one thing; hitting an inside fastball is another." The Associated Press also published a feature story about Boros' studious nature in March 1962. The article noted that Boros was studying contemporary literature in the off-season and hoped to become a professor of literature. The article added: "Hardly a day goes by when Boros isn't carrying two or three books under his arms. He reads in hotel rooms, on planes and on trains." Boros recalled that some of his minor league coaches had opposed his reading, claiming it was bad for his eyes. As for ribbing by his fellow players, he noted that Detroit pitcher Paul Foytack replied to a good fielding play by Boros by yelling, "Atta boy, Steve. Just for that I'll buy you a book."

In December 1961, Boros became the third member of the Tigers to sign a contract for the 1962 season. Detroit vice president Rick Ferrell said at the time, "Boros got a good raise. He was entitled to it. He had a wonderful first year. Steve will be even better next summer, in my opinion."

In 1962, Boros saw his batting average slump to .228, though his propensity to draw bases on balls buoyed his on-base percentage over 100 points to .331. His 14 doubles and 16 home runs provided a .407 slugging percentage. On August 6, 1962, Boros became the eighth Detroit Tigers player to hit three home runs in one game — accomplishing the feat against the Cleveland Indians, including two home runs off Sam McDowell. After the game, Boros said, "I'm swinging the bat like I did two years ago." Two weeks later, he hit his first major league grand slam in the first inning of a game against the Washington Senators. The next day, he achieved a less desirable distinction when he tied an American League record by committing four errors, two in one inning.

=== Chicago Cubs ===
On November 28, 1962, Boros was traded by the Tigers to the Chicago Cubs for pitcher Bob Anderson. The Cubs vice president John Holland said he expected Boros to provide "protection in the infield" and prove valuable as a righthanded pinch-hitter. Boros had been a leading candidate for the American League Rookie of the Year award until he broke his collar bone in August 1961. Less than two years later, and with Ron Santo securely entrenched as the Cubs third baseman, he spent most of the 1963 season on the Cubs bench. Boros appeared in 41 games for the 1963 Cubs, including 14 at first base and 11 as an outfielder. He compiled a .211 batting average in 90 at-bats, though his on-base percentage was nearly 100 points higher at .304.

=== Cincinnati Reds ===
On December 14, 1963, Boros was purchased by the Cincinnati Reds from the Cubs. He was acquired for a sum that The Sporting News described as "peanuts" and assigned to the Reds San Diego Padres farm team in the Pacific Coast League. However, he was invited to spring training with the Reds in Tampa, Florida.

With the departure of the Reds' two regular third basemen, Chico Ruiz opened the 1964 season as the Reds' starting third baseman, and Boros was returned to San Diego. However, Boros was quickly called up by the Reds and became the team's regular third baseman by the second week of May 1964. By early July, Boros was batting slightly under .300, set a club record with 50 errorless games, and had established himself as "one of the top favorites among Red fans." Boros' streak was seven games short of the National League record of 57 errorless games by third baseman Bob Aspromonte. Boros credited his improvement in fielding to his studying the play of Ron Santo in Chicago during the 1963 season. Boros concluded that Santo was the best third baseman he had ever seen. Previously, Boros had tried to be a "cool, graceful player of the Gil McDougald type." Based on his observation of Santo, he changed his philosophy and changed into "a scrambling, aggressive type." He later described the 50-game errorless streak as his biggest thrill in baseball.

During the 1964 season, Boros started 113 games at third base, compiling a .257 batting average and .342 on-base percentage in 370 at-bats. At the start of the 1965 season, the Reds moved Deron Johnson from first to third base and had no further need for Boros. He appeared in only two games for the Reds in 1965, making his final major league appearance on May 8, 1965.

In all or parts of seven major league seasons, Boros batted .245 with a .344 on-base percentage and 26 home runs.

=== Return to the minor leagues ===
Boros continued to play at the AAA level through 1969. He appeared in 117 games for the San Diego Padres of the Pacific Coast League in 1965. He spent the 1966 and 1967 seasons with the Buffalo Bisons in the International League. He split the 1968 season between the Indianapolis Indians and Vancouver Mounties in the Pacific Coast League and finished his playing career with the Omaha Royals of the American Association.

== Baseball manager, coach and scout ==
=== Kansas City Royals ===
Boros began a managerial career in the Kansas City Royals farm system in 1970 as the manager of the Waterloo Royals, their Waterloo, Iowa farm team from 1970 to 1972. While managing in Waterloo, he was ejected from a game after protesting what he called "a series of atrocious calls." Boros retreated to the clubhouse where he hand-lettered a sign reading "UMPIRES". He nailed the sign to the scoreboard on top of the visiting team's name. At the end of the game, the scoreboard read, "UMPIRES 9, WATERLOO 2". Boros was fined $100 for the incident.

In January 1973, Boros was transferred to the Royals other Class A affiliate, San Jose Bees. Boros was the manager in San Jose during the 1973 and 1974 seasons, where under his management, San Jose set a modern minor league record with 372 stolen bases.

At the end of September 1974, the Royals announced Boros was being elevated to the major league club to replace Charley Lau on the team's coaching staff for the 1975 season. He was the Royals third base coach in 1975 under manager Whitey Herzog. From 1976 to 1979, he was the Royal's first base coach and was "credited with helping the Royals develop an aggressive baserunning style." While Boros was in Kansas City, he began to attract media attention for his "scientific approach" to baseball. In July 1977, the UPI published a feature story about Boros in which it observed:

Boros began putting a book together on all the pitchers and catchers in the American League last year, noting their strengths and weaknesses and any tipoffs that might give Royals runners an edge on the basepaths. His observations were written into a small 25-cent notepad along with a flock of stopwatch readings that represent the time it takes a pitcher to throw the ball to home plate out of both the stretch and windup, and how long it takes a catcher to peg the ball to second and third base.

Boros also studied pitchers, looking for tipoffs they intended to throw to first base. He said, "There's always some tipoff. The head, the shoulder, the hip, the knee, the toe – every pitcher has something that gives away his pickoff move. When you find it, you've got the upper hand on the base baths." With the benefit of Boros' scientific approach, the Royals led the American League in stolen bases in both 1978 (216) and 1979 (207). The 1978 team had eight players (led by Willie Wilson, Freddie Patek, Amos Otis, George Brett, and Hal McRae) who stole at least 10 bases and won the American League West pennant with a record of 92–70.

=== Montreal Expos ===
In 1980, Boros was hired by the Montreal Expos organization and managed the Calgary Expos. During the 1981 and 1982 seasons, he was the first base coach for the Montreal Expos. Boros was hired by the Expos in part due to his reputation as one of the best coaches in baseball at teaching base stealing technique. His San Jose team set the modern minor league record with 372 stolen bases, and the Royals led the American League in stolen bases during his tenure there. During Boros' two seasons as the Expos first base coach, Tim Raines became the leading base stealer in the National League with 71 and 78 stolen bases in 1981 and 1982. In May 1981, Sports Illustrated credited Boros with Raines' sudden burst of base-stealing: "Boros deserves some of the credit for Raines' base-running success. Positioning himself a few yards up the first base line from the bag, Boros surveys the mound from the same angle as Raines, notes whether the pitcher signals his move home with his front leg, front shoulder or head, and records his findings in a notebook. Boros also carries a stopwatch to time pitchers' deliveries home and catchers' throws to second."

A March 1982 feature story by Peter Gammons focused on Boros' mentoring of Raines. Gammons described Boros as the "leading exponent" in baseball of the stolen base. Gammons added: "Boros is Lee Strasberg to Raines and the host of young speedsters coming through the Expos organization, constantly mixing technique and science with the athlete's artistic ability. There is constant work with measured leads and jumps and acceleration. Boros keeps a stop-watch on every catcher and pitcher in the league and records it all, along with telltale quirks and motions." In August 1982, another feature story run by the Associated Press was titled "Expos' coach lives by stopwatch."

Boros preferred to refer to himself an advocate of base running: "I've always been a strong advocate of base running, not necessarily base stealing, but base running. Because ultimately, you win because you score more runs, and what I want is to be 90-feet smarter and 90-feet more aggressive than the other team." Always a student of the game, Boros' attitude toward the stolen base had changed by 1986. In an interview that year, Boros said: "The science against stealing has evolved radically in the last four or five years. That has made it tougher than ever to steal. Pitchers have quicker deliveries, step off and quick pitch, hold the ball. Catchers pitch out much more often. Now you've got pitching coaches with stopwatches timing pitchers' deliveries, while other coaches are timing catchers' throws to second base."

=== Oakland Athletics ===
==== Hiring ====
In November 1982, Boros was hired as the manager of the Oakland Athletics, replacing Billy Martin. Baseball writer Peter Gammons called Boros "quiet, thoughtful and intelligent", while one American League manager said the move "could be one of the best managerial hirings in 10 years." Martin, who had implemented his trademark "Billy Ball" in Oakland, was known for his hot-tempered approach to the game. The Sporting News noted the difference in style between Martin and Boros: "The volatile, dirt-kicking days are over for the time being in Oakland. Steve Boros, the man named to succeed Billy Martin, will live on the quiet side of Manager's Row. . . . Unlike Martin, Boros said he will not rant and rave. He has been kicked out of just two games in his 25-year pro baseball career."

==== Computer pioneer ====
During the 1983 season, Boros gained note for his pioneering use of "sabermetrics" and a computer to help guide his managerial decisions. In his book on baseball innovations, historian Peter Morris wrote that Boros was "the first manager to make extensive use of computers in his decision-making process." After every game, Boros had pitch-by-pitch data fed into a mainframe computer at Digital Equipment Corporation in Philadelphia. He would retrieve the data before the next game, analyzing how each pitcher and hitter matched up. Jay Alves, a "sabermetrician" hired by Boros to run the computer system, later recalled: "With Steve, we tracked (on paper) virtually every pitch and where it was hit. Then I'd type it into the computer after the game, but that would take a couple of hours. That's how long it takes me to do it with pencil and paper."

In April 1983, a sports writer noted: "These days in the Oakland Coliseum, where the Athletics do their thing, the phrase is 'Computer Ball' [not 'BillyBall,'] as programmed by Martin's successor, Steve Boros." In May 1983, Newsweek published a story on Boros's pioneering use of the computer titled "The Computers of Summer." In a June 1983 feature story titled "It's the Apple of His Eye", Sports Illustrated wrote that Boros made access to a computer a condition of his hiring and used an Apple II, loaded with pitch-by-pitch data from the 1981 and 1982 seasons, as a scouting tool. The article's author opined: "Though traditionalists may shudder at the thought, it was inevitable that such a stat-happy pursuit as baseball would plug into a data bank. And Boros, 46, a Michigan grad who plans to take classes in computer science during the off-season, is in the forefront of a new wave of enlightened technocrats who are rewiring the game." However, Boros tried to downplay his reliance on the computer, noting, "We're not down in the dugout frantically leafing through pages of computer printouts. I'm too busy watching my pitchers for signs of fatigue or checking my base runners — all the little nuances and gut feelings that you get and no computer can pick up. However, I do study the printouts before each game."

During the 1983 and 1984 seasons, Boros' use of the computer was also profiled in several other publications, including Psychology Today ("The Microchipped Diamond"), InfoWorld ("Playing Ball With Micros"), Digital Deli ("Computer Ball"), and Popular Mechanics ("Science Goes To Bat").

==== 1983 season ====
Despite Boros' use of the computer, the 1983 A's finished in fourth place in the American League West with a record of 74–88. Boros had long been an advocate of stealing bases, and his 1983 team totaled 235 stolen bases—more than any team in the American League since the 1976 Athletics. The team was handicapped by a pitching staff on which no pitcher won more than 12 games, compiling a mediocre 4.34 earned run average, ranking 12th of 15 teams in the American League. In a game against the Minnesota Twins on May 18, 1983, Boros put infielder Wayne Gross into the game as a pitcher, after the A's fell behind by a 16–5 score. Gross had not pitched since he was age 13. Boros was critical of the Twins home field at the Metrodome, saying there was no point in using a "real pitcher", and adding, "I used a joke pitcher for a joke park."

==== 1984 season ====
Before the 1984 season got underway, Boros' notoriety from his use of a computer became a distraction in the eyes of team management and baseball traditionalists. Longtime friend Phil Regan recalled, "He received some criticism for using computers in the mid-1980s and now everyone in the game uses computers." In their book on baseball's fascination with statistics, Alan Schwartz and Peter Gammons wrote:

Baseball's conservatives howled in horror. As 1984 neared, you'd think that George Orwell was in the press box: Almost every article on baseball and computers used a silly, futuristic lead, with machines replacing managers and robots turning double plays. . . . Steve Boros woke up one morning as the standard bearer of baseball's on-field information revolution. After one year on the job, having been profiled in dozens of publications and all but cast as a circus freak, he became unpopular enough in his own clubhouse that he was fired midway through the 1984 season.

After the A's got off to a 20–24 start (2 1/2 games out of first place) in 1984, Boros was fired in late May and replaced with first base coach Jackie Moore. The firing came hours after a team meeting in which Boros told the players that he would not change his personality. First baseman Bruce Bochte said, "Steve indicated there was a lot of talk going around, that his situation wasn't stable. He said he was going to go ahead and be the kind of manager he had been, that he wasn't going to change to keep his job."

==== Reaction to firing ====
The A's offered Boros a front-office job, but he declined. Unemployed during a baseball season for the first time in over 20 years, Boros said he would take some time off but hoped to manage again. He met with the press at his home, drinking from a cup that read "No More Mr. Nice Guy." He noted that the team's management felt he wasn't tough enough on the players, especially Rickey Henderson. Boros said, "This nice guy label — I'm kind of getting clubbed to death with it. The public misinterpreted it when it saw a manager who went and talked to his players and asked their feelings. That all helped to create this impression of too nice a guy, one who can't make up his mind. The players are telling him what to do." Sports Illustrated ran a feature on the firing of Boros several months later. The article refuted the charge that Boros lacked toughness but opened as follows:

When the Oakland A's dismissed Steve Boros in May, the manager's failing was more narrowly defined: He wasn't 'tough enough.' Newspapers across the country solemnly reported this canard. The shortcoming most mentioned was that the A's skipper didn't sufficiently 'stand up for his players'; that is, he didn't kick dirt on umpires or get thrown out of games. It was also revealed that Boros had read more than 100 books, cover to cover, and had other wimpy interests. Real men don't eat quiche. Tough guys don't dance. And so on.

Boros noted:

When they talk about toughness, they always talk about arguing bad calls, spitting in an umpire's eye, kicking dust — all that macho image stuff. ... If the fans saw that kind of behavior in a football coach, they'd be repelled by it. Isn't it funny that one kind of behavior is expected from a football coach and another from a baseball manager? And they both have essentially the same job. It seems to me it takes a certain amount of mental toughness to keep control of your emotions. You owe it to management, your players and the fans to keep yourself under control at critical moments.

=== San Diego Padres ===
In late 1984, Boros was hired as the director of minor league instruction for the San Diego Padres. When the Padres manager Dick Williams resigned suddenly at the start of spring training in late February 1986, Boros was hired to replace him. Boros was perceived as the antithesis of the "gruff and uncommunicative" Williams. Boros noted, "Dick likes to be aloof, apart from the players. I like to be close to them. I really like young players and enjoy working with them." Sports Illustrated wrote as follows about the contrast between Williams and Boros:

The move may not have been as revolutionary as the introduction of the McDLT, but last week the hamburger-funded San Diego Padres went from the hot of Dick Williams to the cool of Steve Boros. . . . [I]t marked the greatest contrast in successive baseball managers since, well, since Steve Boros followed Billy Martin in Oakland."

In an interview with the San Diego Union at the start of the 1986 season, Boros assured Padres fans that he would not make extensive use of the computer as he had in Oakland. The resulting article noted:

At Oakland, Boros used computers extensively, studying percentages and tendencies to guide his strategic decisions, but at heart, he is a humanist. He would rather read a good baseball novel than a complex statistical analysis of the game. 'I found that players are very suspicious of computers, much like the general public,' he said. 'They fear them as cold and impersonal and inhuman. I couldn't make them understand that I was still going to make my own decisions, I wasn't going to let the computer make them for me. I'm going to use some data and stats here, but we won't have a computer and a programmer in the clubhouse like we did in Oakland.

One of Boros' first managerial decisions resulted from stiff competition for the starting first baseman job. Steve Garvey began the season as the team's starting first baseman, but Boros saw the potential of rookie John Kruk. By late July, Boros concluded that Kruk deserved to be in the lineup and began alternating him at first base and in the outfield. Another widely publicized incident during Boros' tenure with the Padres occurred in early June 1986 when he was ejected before the first pitch in a game against the Atlanta Braves. During the exchange of lineup cards, Boros tried to hand a videotape to the umpire who had made a disputed call the previous night resulting in a triple play. Boros was ejected for the first time in 259 games as a major league manager.

Boros also developed a reputation for constant tinkering with the lineup. In August 1986, veteran Graig Nettles gave Boros the nickname, "Mr. Moves." Boros responded by benching the slumping Nettles and joking that, while he'd tried a lot of things, "that's one thing I didn't try." Boros set a Padres team record in a September 22 game against the Atlanta Braves by using 22 players, including six pitchers, in a nine-inning game.

By September 1986, speculation began that he would not be retained as the team's manager. The Sporting News reported: "The Padres have foundered under his direction, sagging to last place in the National League west. While there are myriad extenuations — injuries to starting pitchers Eric Show and Dave Dravecky chief among them — those closest to the club's management have privately expressed doubts about whether Boros will be asked back." Boros replied that the speculation was "as predictable as the leaves turning in September and October."

Having played in the World Series two years earlier, the 1986 Padres finished in fourth place in the National League West with a disappointing record of 74–88. The speculation that Boros would be fired proved accurate, as he was replaced by Larry Bowa on October 24, 1986. Boros said at the time, "I was prepared for the fact that I wouldn't be coming back. ... It's like the good news and bad news joke. The good news was that at the end of the season I hadn't been fired. The bad news was I hadn't been rehired."

=== Later years ===
After his managerial career, Boros worked as a scout and coach for several teams. His work as an advance scout for the Los Angeles Dodgers in 1988 resulted in one of the most memorable moments in World Series history — Kirk Gibson's 1988 World Series home run. Boros was part of a scout team that studied the Athletics, the Dodgers opponent in the 1988 World Series. Boros noted that Oakland relief ace Dennis Eckersley tended to throw a backdoor slider on 3–2 counts to left-handed hitters. When Eckersley threw that pitch to Kirk Gibson in the ninth inning of the first game of the World Series, Gibson hit a home run to win the game for the Dodgers. Gibson's home run was voted the "greatest moment in L.A. sports history" in a 1995 poll.

He worked for the Kansas City Royals from 1993 to 1994 and for the Baltimore Orioles in 1995. Phil Regan, who had been friends with Boros since the 1950s, hired Boros at Baltimore and later recalled, "When I became the manager at Baltimore in 1995, one of my first calls was to Steve and he joined us as my third-base coach. Steve was one of the finest baserunning instructors of his time. He was one of the first guys to always have a stop watch in his hand to clock both runners and the time it takes for a pitcher to throw to first base."

Boros was hired by the Detroit Tigers in 1996 and served as the team's minor league field coordinator from 1996 to 2002. He became the Tigers director of player development in 2003 and a special assistant to general manager Dave Dombrowski in 2004.

== Family and death ==
Boros and his wife, Sharla, were married in 1973. They had two children, Sasha and Steve. He also had a daughter Renee from a previous marriage. His son Steve became a baseball scout for the New York Yankees, later the Chicago Cubs. His daughter Sasha is the women's tennis coach for the University of Iowa. In 1996, Boros was honored with induction into the University of Michigan Athletic Hall of Honor.

In his later years, Boros suffered from multiple myeloma, a cancer of plasma cells. He died at his home in DeLand, Florida in December 2010 as the result of complications from the disease. After Boros's death, former Los Angeles Dodgers general manager Fred Claire wrote, "I don't know that I've ever met a nicer man in the game of baseball. I know I've never met a tougher and more determined man when it came to doing the right thing."
