= Bobo Osborne =

American baseball player & scout (1935–2011)

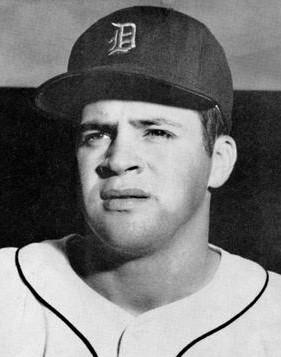
- Osborne in 1959
- First baseman
- Born: October 12, 1935; Chattahoochee, Georgia, U.S.
- Died: April 15, 2011 (aged 75); Woodstock, Georgia, U.S.
- Batted: Left Threw: Right

MLB debut
- June 27, 1957, for the Detroit Tigers

Last MLB appearance
- September 24, 1963, for the Washington Senators

MLB statistics
- Batting average: .206
- Home runs: 17
- Runs batted in: 86
- Stats at Baseball Reference

Teams
- Detroit Tigers (1957–1959, 1961–1962); Washington Senators (1963)

Larry Sidney "Bobo" Osborne (October 12, 1935 – April 15, 2011) was an American professional baseball player and scout. A first baseman and third baseman, Osborne appeared in 359 games over six seasons in Major League Baseball for the Detroit Tigers (1957–59; 1961–62) and Washington Senators (1963). He batted left-handed, threw right-handed, and was listed at 6 feet 1 inch (1.85 m) tall and 205 pounds (93 kg). He was born in Chattahoochee, Georgia; his father, "Tiny", had been an MLB pitcher during the 1920s.

Osborne graduated from West Fulton High School in Atlanta in 1953 and passed up a football scholarship from Auburn University to sign a pro baseball contract with the Tigers. A power hitter in minor league baseball, Osborne played four full seasons in the Majors. In 1959, he was the Tigers' second-string first baseman, playing behind veteran Gail Harris. He appeared in 86 games, but batted only .196. In 1961 he backed up American League batting champion (and All-Star first baseman) Norm Cash, and the following season he was Detroit's reserve third baseman, behind Steve Boros, but hit .215 and .230.

In the midst of his four full MLB seasons, in 1960, Osborne spent a year with the Triple-A Denver Bears and he won the American Association's Triple Crown, leading the league in batting (.342) and home runs (34) and tying with teammate Boros for the runs batted in lead (119). In winning the batting title, Osborne edged Minneapolis Millers outfielder Carl Yastrzemski by three percentage points.

In March 1963, Washington acquired Osborne in a trade for outfielder Wayne Comer, and he ultimately became the Senators' starter at first base in 1963, appearing in 125 games and slugging 12 of his 17 big-league home runs, including a two-homer day on May 2 against his former team.

Osbone collected 157 hits in the Major Leagues, with 30 doubles and two triples accompanying his 17 home runs. He had 86 runs batted in. After his MLB career concluded in 1963, he played six more seasons in the minor leagues, through 1969, then became a longtime scout for the San Francisco Giants based in Woodstock, Georgia. He died at 75 from complications of diabetes and other illnesses.

== See also ==
- List of second-generation Major League Baseball players
