= Chuck Essegian =

American baseball player (born 1931)

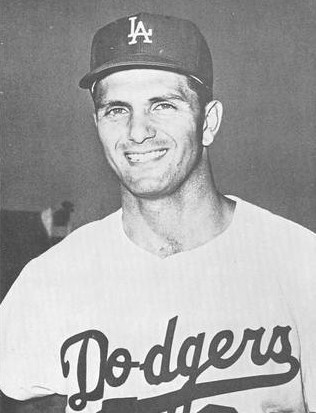
- Left fielder
- Born: August 9, 1931 (age 95); Boston, Massachusetts, U.S.
- Batted: Right Threw: Right

MLB debut
- April 15, 1958, for the Philadelphia Phillies

Last MLB appearance
- September 28, 1963, for the Kansas City Athletics

MLB statistics
- Batting average: .255
- Home runs: 47
- Runs batted in: 150

NPB statistics
- Batting average: .263
- Home runs: 15
- Runs batted in: 41
- Stats at Baseball Reference

Teams
- Philadelphia Phillies (1958); St. Louis Cardinals (1959); Los Angeles Dodgers (1959–1960); Baltimore Orioles (1961); Kansas City Athletics (1961); Cleveland Indians (1961–1962); Kansas City Athletics (1963); Kintetsu Buffaloes (1964)

Career highlights and awards
- World Series champion (1959)

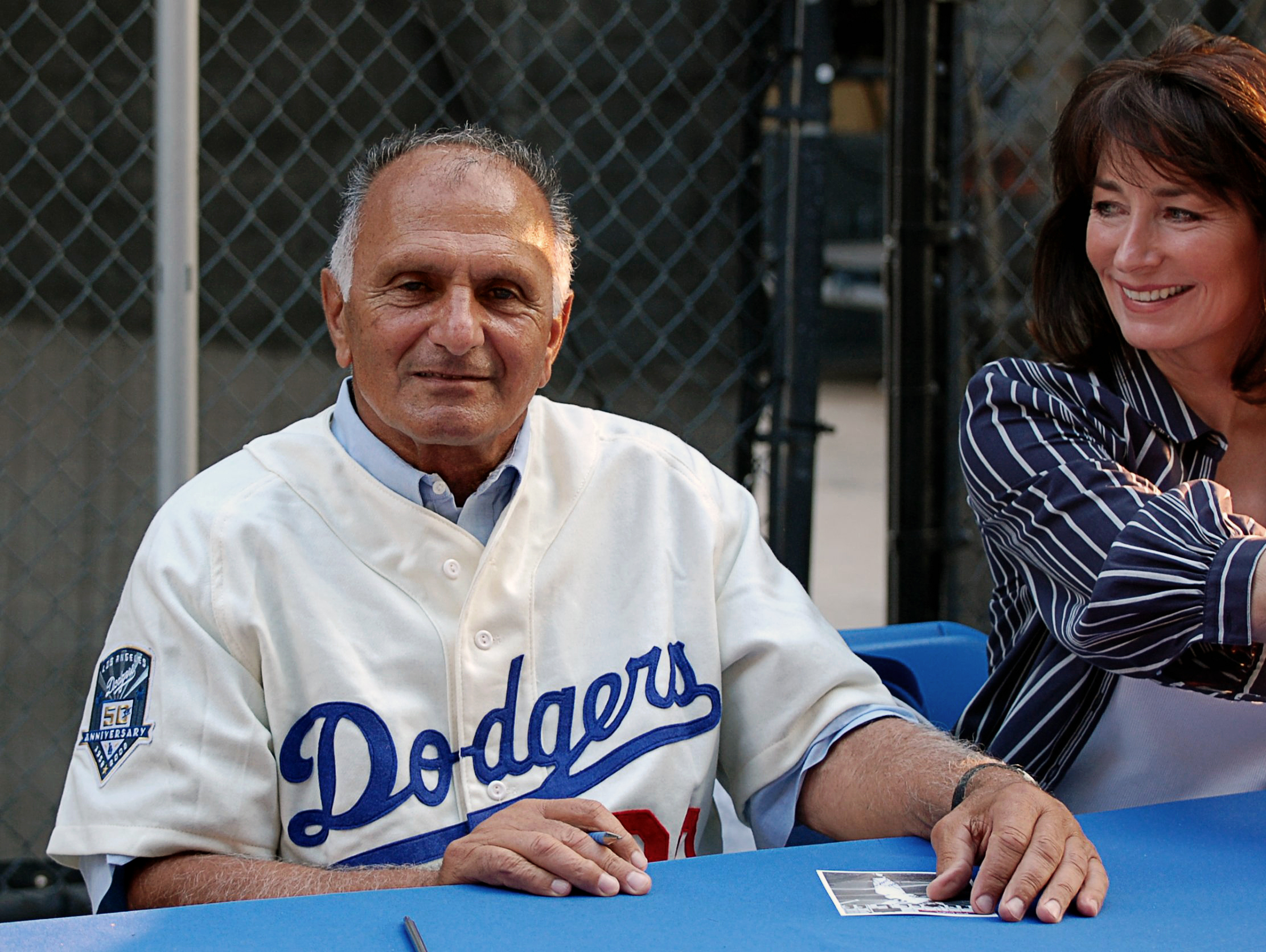
Chuck Essegian in 2008

Charles Abraham Essegian (born August 9, 1931) is an American former professional baseball left fielder. He appeared in 404 games in Major League Baseball (MLB) over six seasons (1958–1963) for the Philadelphia Phillies, St. Louis Cardinals, Los Angeles Dodgers, Baltimore Orioles, Kansas City Athletics and Cleveland Indians. During the 1959 World Series, Essegian, then with the Dodgers, set a Series record with two pinch-hit home runs against the Chicago White Sox. The mark was matched by Bernie Carbo of the Boston Red Sox, who a hit pair of pinch-hit homers against the Cincinnati Reds in the 1975 World Series.

Essegian also played one season (1964) in Nippon Professional Baseball (NPB) for the Kintetsu Buffaloes. Listed as 5 feet 11 inches (1.80 m) tall and 200 pounds (91 kg), he threw and batted right-handed.

== Stanford baseball and football star ==
Essegian was born in Boston but grew up from the age of five in Los Angeles. He graduated from Fairfax High School and matriculated at Stanford University in Palo Alto, California, where he played varsity baseball and football. A linebacker, he played in the Rose Bowl after Stanford's 1951 football season and became the second player (after Jackie Jensen) to appear in both the World Series and the Rose Bowl.

== MLB career ==
Essegian entered professional baseball by signing with the independently-operated Sacramento Solons of the Open-Classification Pacific Coast League in 1953. After spending four full years with Sacramento or its affiliates, Essegian was acquired by the Phillies in 1957, then joined the Philadelphia varsity in 1958, getting into 39 MLB games and bashing five home runs.

In 1959, he played for two Triple-A clubs and two MLB teams, and set his World Series mark. He began the year with the Cardinals, playing in 17 games but batting only .179; he was sent down to Rochester, then traded to the Dodgers on June 15. His hometown team optioned Essegian to Triple-A Spokane for six weeks before recalling him in early August. Essegian responded by batting .304 for the Dodgers in 24 games and helped them win the National League (NL) pennant. Then, during the 1959 World Series, he clubbed his two pinch hit homers; the first, hit in the seventh inning of Game 2 off Bob Shaw, enabled the Dodgers to tie the game 2–2 and turn the tide of the World Series. After losing Game 1 to the White Sox 11–0, with Essegian's game-tying blast (then Charlie Neal's two-run shot two batters later), Los Angeles went on to win Game 2, 4–3, and then capture the world championship in six games.

Essegian continued his nomadic career soon after the 1959 Fall Classic, however. After batting only .215 in 52 games for the 1960 Dodgers, he was dealt to the American League (AL), where he had a one-game trial with the Orioles (1961), two stints (1961; 1963) with the Athletics, and his most prolonged tenure, 166 games, as a member of the Indians (1961–1962). He was traded along with Jerry Walker from the Orioles to the Athletics for Dick Hall and Dick Williams on 12 April 1961. He hit .333 in four appearances with the Athletics before being sent to the Indians for minor-league left-handed pitcher Julius Grant three weeks later on 3 May. His most productive season came in 1962, when he posted career bests in batting (.274), runs (59), hits (92), doubles (12), home runs (21), runs batted in (RBI) (50), and games played (106). In his six-season career, Essegian was a .255 hitter (260-for-1,018) with 45 doubles, four triples, 47 home runs, and 150 RBI in 404 games. Defensively, he recorded a .981 fielding percentage as an outfielder.

== Japan and minor leagues ==
Following his big league career, Essegian played the 1964 season in NPB, for the Kintetsu Buffaloes of the Pacific League. He also played in seven seasons in Minor League Baseball (MiLB) seasons between 1953 and 1959, registering a .311 average, with 97 homers, in 717 games.

== Life after baseball ==
After Essegian’s baseball career ended, he earned a Juris Doctor degree and became an attorney in Southern California, retiring in 1987.
