= Jay Hankins =

American baseball player (1935–2020)

- Outfielder
- Born: November 7, 1935; St. Louis County, Missouri, U.S.
- Died: January 20, 2020 (aged 84); Kansas City, Missouri, U.S.
- Batted: Left Threw: Right

MLB debut
- April 15, 1961, for the Kansas City Athletics

Last MLB appearance
- June 16, 1963, for the Kansas City Athletics

MLB statistics
- Batting average: .184
- Home runs: 4
- Runs batted in: 10
- Stats at Baseball Reference

Teams
- Kansas City Athletics (1961, 1963)

Jay Nelson Hankins (November 7, 1935 – January 20, 2020) was an American professional baseball player who played two seasons for the Kansas City Athletics of Major League Baseball.

Hankins attended the University of Missouri. He was a member of the Tigers team that won the 1954 College World Series. Hankins was signed as a free agent by the Kansas City Athletics in 1957.

After his playing days were over, Hankins worked both as a minor league manager for the Kansas City Royals organization and as the Scouting Director for the Philadelphia Phillies from 1989 to 1992. He died on January 20, 2020.
