= Andy Carey =

American baseball player (1931–2011)

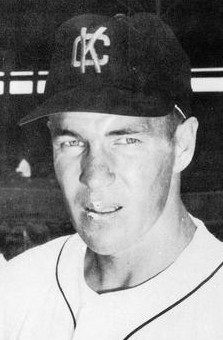
- Third baseman
- Born: October 18, 1931; Oakland, California, U.S.
- Died: December 15, 2011 (aged 80); Costa Mesa, California, U.S.
- Batted: Right Threw: Right

MLB debut
- May 2, 1952, for the New York Yankees

Last MLB appearance
- September 30, 1962, for the Los Angeles Dodgers

MLB statistics
- Batting average: .260
- Home runs: 64
- Runs batted in: 350
- Stats at Baseball Reference

Teams
- New York Yankees (1952–1960); Kansas City Athletics (1960–1961); Chicago White Sox (1961); Los Angeles Dodgers (1962)

Career highlights and awards
- 2× World Series champion (1956, 1958)

Andrew Arthur Carey (né Hexem; October 18, 1931 – December 15, 2011) was an American professional baseball third baseman. He played in Major League Baseball for the New York Yankees (1952–1960), Kansas City Athletics (1960–1961), Chicago White Sox (1961), and Los Angeles Dodgers (1962).

== Early life ==
Carey was born on October 18, 1931, as Andrew Arthur Hexem in Oakland, California, and raised in Alameda, California. His parents divorced when he was young, and his mother remarried Kenneth Carey, a divorce lawyer. Carey later took his adopted father's name.

Carey attended Alameda High School, where he played as a pitcher and third baseman for the school's baseball team. He graduated in 1949, and rather than sign a professional baseball contract, attended Saint Mary's College of California. Carey made Saint Mary's college baseball team as a freshman. He also played semi-professional baseball in Weiser, Idaho, where he caught the attention of New York Yankees scout Joe Devine.

== Career ==
Carey signed with the Yankees, receiving a $60,000 signing bonus. He made his major league debut with the Yankees in 1952. By 1954, Carey was the Yankees' starting third baseman. That year, he had a .302 batting average and 65 runs batted in (RBIs) in 122 games played. In 1955, Carey led the American League with 11 triples. While playing for the Yankees in the 1956 World Series, Carey twice helped preserve Don Larsen's perfect game against the Dodgers on October 8, 1956. In the second inning, the Dodgers’ Jackie Robinson smacked a shot between third and short that Carey knocked down, allowing shortstop Gil McDougald to pick up the ball and nip Robinson at first. In the eighth, he robbed Gil Hodges by snaring a low line drive that seemed headed for left field.

Carey played for the Yankees into the 1960 season. By this point, the emergence of Clete Boyer as the Yankees third baseman led them to trade Carey after four games to the Kansas City Athletics for Bob Cerv.

In June 1961, the Athletics traded Carey, Larsen, Ray Herbert, and Al Pilarcik to the Chicago White Sox for Wes Covington, Stan Johnson, Bob Shaw, and Gerry Staley.

After the 1961 season, the White Sox traded Carey with Frank Barnes to the Philadelphia Phillies for Taylor Phillips and Bob Sadowski. However, Carey refused to report to Philadelphia, and the White Sox sent Cal McLish to the Phillies to compensate them. The White Sox then traded Carey to the Los Angeles Dodgers for Ramon Conde and Jim Koranda before the 1962 season. The Dodgers released Carey after the 1962 season.

In an 11-year career, he had a .260 batting average, with 64 home runs, and 350 RBIs. He had 741 career hits. He finished his career with 38 triples.

== Personal life ==
After he retired, Carey worked as a stockbroker for Mitchum, Jones, and Templeton in Los Angeles.

Carey married four times, and was divorced three times. He had four children. Carey marriages included being married to actress, Lucy Marlow, with whom he had two children.

Carey died on December 15, 2011, in Costa Mesa, California, of Lewy body dementia.

== See also ==
- List of Major League Baseball annual triples leaders
