= Jerry Walker =

American baseball player (1939–2024)

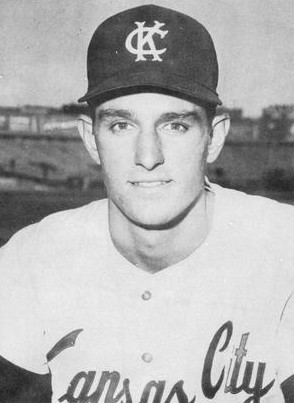
- Pitcher
- Born: February 12, 1939; Ada, Oklahoma, U.S.
- Died: July 14, 2024 (aged 85); Ada, Oklahoma, U.S.
- Batted: Switch Threw: Right

MLB debut
- July 6, 1957, for the Baltimore Orioles

Last MLB appearance
- September 25, 1964, for the Cleveland Indians

MLB statistics
- Win–loss record: 37–44
- Earned run average: 4.36
- Strikeouts: 326
- Stats at Baseball Reference

Teams
- Baltimore Orioles (1957–1960); Kansas City Athletics (1961–1962); Cleveland Indians (1963–1964)

Career highlights and awards
- All-Star (1959²)

Jerry Allen Walker (February 12, 1939 – July 14, 2024) was an American professional baseball pitcher. He played in Major League Baseball (MLB) for the Baltimore Orioles, Kansas City Athletics, and Cleveland Indians between 1957 and 1964.

== Early life ==
Walker was born on February 12, 1939, just south of Ada, Oklahoma, at Pecan Grove. He was raised with two brothers and a sister by his parents Annie Elizabeth (Rhodes) and Oliver Ansel Walker on a farm at Byng, Oklahoma, where he attended Byng High School, graduating in 1957. He had a 52–1 record pitching at Byng.

Baltimore Orioles pitching coach Harry Brecheen, who was a native Oklahoman who grew up and lived in Ada, had scouted Walker and was impressed by his pitching control. Walker signed with the Orioles as a "bonus baby" out of Ada's Byng High School on June 28, 1957, for a reported signing bonus of $60,000. He continued his education at East Central University.

== Pitching career ==
A member of the Orioles' and general manager/manager Paul Richards fabled "Kiddie Corps" of young pitchers signed in the late 1950s or 1960 (others included Milt Pappas, Steve Barber, Jack Fisher, and Chuck Estrada), Walker is one of a very few players to have gone straight to the Major Leagues without ever playing a game in the minor leagues. He pitched for the Orioles eight days (or alternatively reported, six weeks) after graduating high school and/or signing with the Orioles.

In his debut, on July 6, 1957, against the Boston Red Sox, he failed to retire a batter, issuing bases on balls to Mickey Vernon and Jackie Jensen, then uncorking a wild pitch. Walker then was lifted from the game, but both runners scored, giving Walker an earned run average of infinity coming out of his first MLB game. When Brecheen came out to the mound to ask the 18-year old what was wrong that day, Walker responded that he had never seen that many people in his life. However, he was consistently more effective as the season progressed, and threw a four-hit, complete game shutout against the Washington Senators on September 4, beating Camilo Pascual 1–0 for his first big-league victory. This was the first win by one of Paul Richards bonus babies.

He played the bulk of the 1958 season with the Knoxville Smokies of the Single-A Southern Atlantic League, with an 18–4 win-loss record and 2.61 earned run average (ERA).

Back with the Orioles in 1959, Walker became the youngest pitcher ever to start a Major League Baseball All-Star Game when, at age 20, he went to mound for the American League in the second All-Star contest of 1959. He went three innings and allowed one run on two hits and one base on balls, and was credited with the win in a 5–3 AL victory at Los Angeles Memorial Coliseum.

Later that season, on September 11, 1959, he hurled a 16-inning, 178 pitch (or more), complete game shutout against the eventual league champion Chicago White Sox, winning 1–0. It was his 11th and final win of the 1959 season, his most successful campaign in the big leagues. His 2.92 earned run average (ERA) was among the top five that year. Before the 1960 season, he was described as a thinking pitcher, "with good control and plenty of breaking stuff". Teammate Jackie Brandt described him as tricking hitters.

Walker was traded along with outfielder Chuck Essegian from the Orioles to the Athletics for pitcher Dick Hall and outfielder Dick Williams on April 12, 1961. Coincidentally, only 22 months later, on February 27, 1963, Kansas City dealt Walker to Cleveland to reacquire outfielder Essegian.

In 1963, Walker became a part of baseball history when he saved Early Wynn's 300th win on July 13, 1963. Wynn and the Indians were leading 5–1 heading to the bottom of the fifth, but when Wynn let up three runs in the bottom of the inning, he was pinch-hit for in the top of the sixth. Walker was tasked with preserving the one-run lead to keep Wynn eligible for the victory, and he threw four scoreless innings to secure the 7–4 victory.

Over his major league career, in 190 games pitched, 90 as a starter, he allowed 734 hits and 341 bases on balls over 747 innings. He had 326 strikeouts, 16 complete games, four shutouts and 13 saves.Walker was an adept hitter, posting a .230 batting average (58-for-252) with 24 runs, 4 home runs and 21 RBI. He fielded his position well, recording a .989 fielding percentage with only two errors in 178 total chances.

After his major league career ended, Walker pitched the next three years in the minor leagues, 1965–67, the last two for the Toledo Mud Hens and then Binghamton Triplets in the New York Yankees farm system.

== Legacy ==
By age 26, however, Walker was out of the Majors, his career cut short by a sore arm. As a minor league manager, Walker theorized that sore arm problems in successful young pitchers were related to the change from pitching minor league baseball to major league baseball. A minor league team may only have one or two truly capable hitters, but major league teams are filled with capable hitters and pitchers have to bear down more. He recommended bringing young major league pitchers along more slowly. There is some belief that Richards allowing Walker to pitch the 16-inning shutout began Walker's arm troubles, but Walker himself is not certain this was the case.

== Manager, coach, scout and front-office executive ==
Walker's playing career ended in 1967 in the Double-A Eastern League, but he maintained his involvement in organized baseball as a minor league manager, big-league pitching coach, scout and front-office executive. Walker managed in the Yankees minor league system from 1968–73. In 1978, he scouted future Yankee star pitcher Dave Righetti. He was a pitching coach with the Yankees (1981–82) and Houston Astros (1983–85).

He served as a special assignment scout for the Detroit Tigers starting in 1985, and served one season (1993) as their general manager, before being fired; the Tigers posted an 85–77 record and finished tied for third in the American League East Division that season.

From 1995 through 2007, Walker was the vice president and director of player personnel in the front office of the St. Louis Cardinals, working as a key assistant to general manager Walt Jocketty. He then became a vice president and special assistant to Jocketty with the Cincinnati Reds, 2009–14. He retired from the Reds in 2016 or 2019.

== Honors ==
In 2020, he received the Legends in Scouting Award from the Professional Baseball Scouts Foundation.

== Personal life and death ==
Walker made Ada his home for his entire life. He was particularly known in Ada for the family home's annual Christmas display, and dressing as Santa Claus on Christmas Eve (giving out candy to children), that delighted decades of Ada's children.

Walker died after a heart attack at his home in Ada, on July 14, 2024, at the age of 85. At the time of his death, he had been married to Janis (Violet) Walker for 64 years, and was survived by two daughters, six grandchildren and six great grandchildren.

== See also ==
- List of baseball players who went directly to Major League Baseball

Sporting positions
Preceded by Clyde King	New York Yankees co-pitching coach (with Jeff Torborg); 1982	Succeeded by Stan Williams
Preceded by Mel Wright	Houston Astros co-pitching coach (with Les Moss); 1983–1985	Succeeded by Les Moss
Preceded by Joe McDonald	Detroit Tigers general manager 1993	Succeeded by Joe Klein
