= Mike DeGerick =

American baseball player (born 1943)

- Pitcher
- Born: April 1, 1943 (age 83); New York City, New York, U.S.
- Batted: Right Threw: Right

MLB debut
- September 4, 1961, for the Chicago White Sox

Last MLB appearance
- September 13, 1962, for the Chicago White Sox

MLB statistics
- Win–loss record: 0–0
- Earned run average: 3.38
- Innings: 2 2/3
- Stats at Baseball Reference

Teams
- Chicago White Sox (1961–1962)

Michael Arthur DeGerick (born April 1, 1943) is an American former professional baseball pitcher. The 6 ft 2 in (1.88 m), 178 lb (81 kg) right hander appeared in two Major League Baseball games for the Chicago White Sox — one in 1961 and one in 1962. But his career was shortened in April 1963 when he was struck in the head by a line drive while pitching during spring training drills for the Lynchburg White Sox of the Class AA Sally League. The injury cost DeGerick the entire 1963 season and he only pitched in three more minor league games in 1964 before leaving baseball.

Born in New York City, DeGerick signed a $50,000 bonus contract with the White Sox in June 1961 after graduation from high school in nearby Teaneck, New Jersey. He won nine of 11 decisions in the Class D Appalachian League during his rookie campaign, then was recalled to the White Sox in September 1961. In his MLB debut against the Minnesota Twins, DeGerick relieved Russ Kemmerer in the fourth inning with the Twins in the midst of a six-run rally. DeGerick surrendered one earned run and two hits in 1 2/3 innings of work. It was his last action of the season. The following year, after a solid season in Class A (a 12–8 record with a 2.89 earned run average), DeGerick was recalled again for a late-season look and, again facing the Twins, he allowed one hit and no runs in an inning of relief.

He was in Sarasota, Florida, preparing to start the 1963 season in Double-A for the White Sox when he was injured by the line drive and underwent surgery. He did not play in 1963 and pitched only 1 2/3 innings in Class A ball in 1964 before his comeback was halted.

All told, as a Major Leaguer, DeGerick pitched in 2 2/3 innings, gave up three hits, one run, with three bases on balls and a wild pitch.
