= Manny Montejo =

Cuban baseball player (1935–2000)

- Pitcher
- Born: October 16, 1935; Caibarien, Cuba
- Died: January 19, 2000 (aged 64); La Habana, Cuba
- Batted: Right Threw: Right

MLB debut
- July 25, 1961, for the Detroit Tigers

Last MLB appearance
- September 15, 1961, for the Detroit Tigers

MLB statistics
- Win–loss record: 0–0
- Earned run average: 3.86
- Strikeouts: 15
- Stats at Baseball Reference

Teams
- Detroit Tigers (1961)

Manuel Montejo Bofill (October 16, 1935 – January 19, 2000) was a Cuban professional baseball player and right-handed relief pitcher who appeared in 12 games in Major League Baseball (MLB) for the Detroit Tigers in 1961. Born in Caibarien, he stood 5 feet 11 inches (1.80 m) tall and weighed 150 pounds (68 kg).

Montejo's professional career lasted for all or parts of eight seasons between 1957 and 1966. His MLB trial during the latter months of the 1961 campaign saw him allow 13 hits and six bases on balls in 161/3 innings pitched, without earning a decision or a save. He gave up seven earned runs to compile an ERA of 3.86.

He died in Havana at age 64 in 2000, though news of his death did not reach researchers until 2014.
