= Jim Archer =

American baseball player (1932–2019)

- Pitcher
- Born: May 25, 1932; Max Meadows, Virginia, U.S.
- Died: September 9, 2019 (aged 87); Tarpon Springs, Florida, U.S.
- Batted: Right Threw: Left

MLB debut
- April 30, 1961, for the Kansas City Athletics

Last MLB appearance
- September 19, 1962, for the Kansas City Athletics

MLB statistics
- Win–loss record: 9–16
- Earned run average: 3.94
- Strikeouts: 122
- Stats at Baseball Reference

Teams
- Kansas City Athletics (1961–1962)

James William Archer (May 25, 1932 – September 9, 2019) was an American Major League Baseball pitcher who played for two seasons with the Kansas City Athletics. He threw left-handed and batted right.

Archer was eighteen years old when he was signed as an amateur free agent in 1951 by the New York Yankees. He did not make the major leagues till 1961. In between Archer spent seven years in the minor league farm systems of the Baltimore Orioles.

Before the 1961 season began, Archer was part of an eight-player trade that brought him to Kansas City. Archer made his first major league appearance on April 30. He soon became a starting pitcher for Kansas City and finished the 1961 season with a record of 9–15 with a 3.20 Earned Run Average.

Archer pulled a leg muscle in spring training the next year. Favoring the leg, he soon developed tendinitis in his throwing arm. He appeared in just 18 games for Kansas City in 1962. By 1964 Archer was out of professional baseball.

After his playing days were over, Archer served as a city commissioner in Tarpon Springs, Florida. Archer served in the United States Army. He died on September 9, 2019.
