= Gene Stephens =

American baseball player (1933–2019)

- Outfielder
- Born: January 20, 1933; Hiwasse, Arkansas, U.S.
- Died: April 27, 2019 (aged 86); Granbury, Texas, U.S.
- Batted: Left Threw: Right

MLB debut
- April 16, 1952, for the Boston Red Sox

Last MLB appearance
- September 23, 1964, for the Chicago White Sox

MLB statistics
- Batting average: .240
- Home runs: 37
- Runs batted in: 207
- Stats at Baseball Reference

Teams
- Boston Red Sox (1952–1953, 1955–1960); Baltimore Orioles (1960–1961); Kansas City Athletics (1961–1962); Chicago White Sox (1963–1964); Chunichi Dragons (1966)

Glen Eugene Stephens (January 20, 1933 – April 27, 2019) was an American professional baseball outfielder who played in Major League Baseball (MLB) for all or portions of a dozen seasons between 1952 and 1964 for the Boston Red Sox, Baltimore Orioles, Kansas City Athletics and Chicago White Sox. He also played one season in Nippon Professional Baseball (NPB) for the Chunichi Dragons (1966). The native of Gravette, Arkansas, batted left-handed, threw right-hand, and was listed at 6 feet 3 inches (1.91 m) tall and 175 pounds (79 kg). He attended the University of Arkansas.

== Biography ==
Stephens signed with the Red Sox in 1951. After batting .337 with 22 home runs and being selected to the Class D North Carolina State League's All-Star team in his first pro season, Stephens jumped all the way to the majors in 1952, making the Red Sox' roster out of spring training and getting into 21 games for Boston in April, May and September; in between, he returned to the higher minor leagues for more playing time. His first full year in MLB would come in 1955, and he batted a career-best .293 in 109 games played. But Stephens found himself playing behind Boston's entrenched outfield of Baseball Hall of Famer Ted Williams, Gold Glove-winner Jim Piersall and future American League Most Valuable Player Jackie Jensen. Even though he filled in at all three outfield positions, from 1955 until he was traded to the Orioles on June 9, 1960, he was Williams' primary replacement as Boston's left fielder, and was nicknamed "Williams' caddy."

On June 18, 1953, Stephens became the first major leaguer in the modern era (since 1900) to have three hits in a single inning. The record was matched by Johnny Damon on June 27, 2003, who coincidentally accomplished this feat as a Red Sox as well.

In his 12 big-league seasons, Stephens played in 964 games and had 1,913 at bats, 283 runs, 460 hits, 78 doubles, 15 triples, 37 home runs, 207 RBI, 27 stolen bases, 233 walks, .240 batting average, .325 on-base percentage, .355 slugging percentage, 679 total bases and 17 sacrifice hits.

Stephens concluded his professional career in 1967 after 17 seasons. He died April 27, 2019, aged 86, in Granbury, Texas.

== Sources ==
- Career statistics from ESPN · Baseball Reference · Fangraphs · Baseball Reference (Minors) · Retrosheet · Baseball Almanac, or Retrosheet
