= Al Pilarcik =

American baseball player (1930–2010)

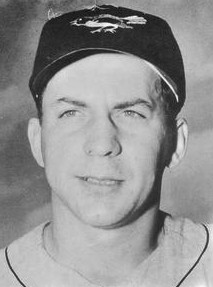
- Outfielder
- Born: July 3, 1930; Whiting, Indiana, U.S.
- Died: September 20, 2010 (aged 80); Schererville, Indiana, U.S.
- Batted: Left Threw: Left

MLB debut
- July 13, 1956, for the Kansas City Athletics

Last MLB appearance
- September 24, 1961, for the Chicago White Sox

MLB statistics
- Batting average: .256
- Home runs: 22
- Runs batted in: 143
- Stats at Baseball Reference

Teams
- Kansas City Athletics (1956); Baltimore Orioles (1957–1960); Kansas City Athletics (1961); Chicago White Sox (1961)

Alfred James Pilarcik (July 3, 1930 – September 20, 2010) was an American professional baseball player. An outfielder, he appeared in 668 Major League games between 1956 and 1961 for the Kansas City Athletics, Baltimore Orioles and Chicago White Sox. Pilarcik stood 5 ft 10 in (1.78 m) tall, weighed 185 lb (84 kg) and threw and batted left-handed.

Primarily a right fielder, Pilarcik played in over 100 games for three successive seasons (1957–1959) as a member of the Orioles. In 1960, his last season in Baltimore, Pilarcik saw less service, but he was stationed in right field at Boston's Fenway Park on September 28, 1960, Ted Williams' final game as an active player. He caught Williams' long drive to right field at the bullpen wall in the fifth inning, then, three frames later, watched helplessly as Williams' 440-foot (134-metre) blast carried over the bullpen for Williams' 521st and final career home run — in the Hall of Fame hitter's last at bat in the Major Leagues.

Pilarcik's career lasted one more season, split between the 1961 Athletics (in his second turn for that franchise) and the White Sox. All told, in six MLB campaigns, he compiled a career batting average of .256 with 22 home runs and 143 runs batted in. Defensively, he recorded a .986 fielding percentage playing at all three outfield positions.

He was signed by Yankees scout Lou Maguolo.

After baseball, he went into the teaching profession and taught at Lake Central High School for 33 years, retiring in 2001.
