= Stan Johnson (baseball) =

American baseball player (1937–2012)

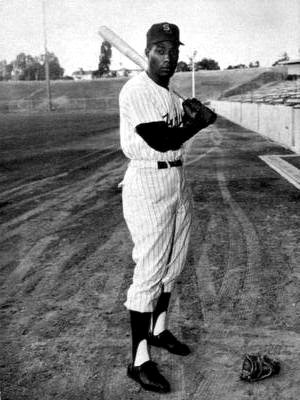
- Outfielder
- Born: February 12, 1937; Dallas, Texas, U.S.
- Died: April 17, 2012 (aged 75); San Francisco, California, U.S.
- Batted: Left Threw: Left

MLB debut
- September 18, 1960, for the Chicago White Sox

Last MLB appearance
- June 13, 1961, for the Kansas City Athletics

MLB statistics
- Batting average: .111
- Home runs: 1
- Runs batted in: 1
- Stats at Baseball Reference

Teams
- Chicago White Sox (1960); Kansas City Athletics (1961); Taiyo Whales (1969)

Stanley Lucius Johnson (February 12, 1937 – April 17, 2012) was an American professional baseball player. He was an outfielder who appeared in eight games in Major League Baseball, 96 games in Nippon Professional Baseball, and over 1,500 games in the minor leagues during his 13-year career (1957–1969). Johnson threw and batted left-handed and was listed as 5 feet 10 inches (1.78 m) tall and 180 pounds (82 kg).

Born in Dallas, Texas, Johnson graduated in 1956 from Galileo High School in San Francisco. After playing baseball for one year at San Francisco City College, he received a baseball scholarship to the University of San Francisco.

He entered pro baseball when he was signed by the Chicago White Sox. In his second pro season, 1958, he led the high-level Western League in runs scored (120) and tied for the lead in hits (204). Two years later, he hit .333 with 172 hits for the Triple-A San Diego Padres of the Pacific Coast League. Each year, he was selected to his league's All-Star team.

Johnson briefly appeared in parts of two major league seasons. He got into five games as a member of the 1960 White Sox during that September's roster expansion. In his second MLB game and at bat, on September 23, 1960, against the Indians at Cleveland Stadium, he was called to pinch hit for White Sox star Minnie Miñoso in the ninth inning when Miñoso was ejected for throwing his batting helmet. Johnson belted a solo home run off Cleveland relief pitcher Frank Funk to seal a 7–0 Chicago triumph.

The blow would be Johnson's only big-league hit. He began 1961 with San Diego, then was included in an eight-player June 10 deal between Chicago and the Kansas City Athletics. In three games with the Athletics, June 11–13, he started one game as the right fielder, but was held hitless in three total at bats.

Johnson then returned to the Pacific Coast League, but as a member of the Hawaii Islanders. He spent the next year in the Los Angeles Dodgers' organization, then joined the Boston Red Sox' system, where he played six years at the Triple-A level. In his one year in Japan, 1969, Johnson batted .242 with five home runs for the Taiyo Whales. He briefly scouted for the Red Sox in Northern California after his playing career ended.

He was married to Jacqueline Miles for 51 years, from February 12, 1961, until his death. Johnson died on April 17, 2012, at the age of 75 after a five-year battle with Parkinson's disease. He is survived by his wife, deceased daughter Stacey Randolph of Missouri City, Texas, and son Stanley Johnson Jr. of San Francisco and his three granddaughters. He was interred at Holy Cross Cemetery in Colma, California.
