= 1962 Los Angeles Angels season =

Major League Baseball season

1962 Los Angeles Angels
- League: American League
- Ballpark: Chávez Ravine Stadium
- City: Los Angeles, California
- Record: 86–76 (.531)
- League place: 3rd
- Owner: Gene Autry
- General manager: Fred Haney
- Manager: Bill Rigney
- Television: KHJ
- Radio: KMPC (Buddy Blattner, Don Wells, Steve Bailey)
- Stats: ESPN.com; Baseball Reference

The 1962 Los Angeles Angels season was the 2nd season of the Angels franchise in the American League, the 2nd in Los Angeles, and their 1st season playing their home games at Chávez Ravine Stadium. The Angels finished the season third in the American League with a record of 86 wins and 76 losses, ten games behind the World Series Champion New York Yankees. The 1962 Angels are one of only two expansion teams to achieve a winning record in its second season of existence in the history of Major League Baseball (the other is the 1999 Arizona Diamondbacks of the National League, who finished as NL West Champions at 100–62). The 1962 Angels was the first Angels team to reside at Dodger Stadium, called Chavez Ravine by the team.

== Offseason ==
- October 19, 1961: Del Rice was released by the Angels.
- November 27, 1961: Bo Belinsky was drafted by the Angels from the Baltimore Orioles in the 1961 rule 5 draft.
- December 4, 1961: Ramón Hernández was purchased by the Angels from the Pittsburgh Pirates.

== Regular season ==
On May 5, Bo Belinsky threw the first no-hitter in the history of the Angels and the first one at Dodger Stadium, beating the Baltimore Orioles 2–0.

=== Season standings ===
American League
Team	W	L	Pct.	GB	Home	Road
New York Yankees	96	66	.593	—	50‍–‍30	46‍–‍36
Minnesota Twins	91	71	.562	5	45‍–‍36	46‍–‍35
Los Angeles Angels	86	76	.531	10	40‍–‍41	46‍–‍35
Detroit Tigers	85	76	.528	10½	49‍–‍33	36‍–‍43
Chicago White Sox	85	77	.525	11	43‍–‍38	42‍–‍39
Cleveland Indians	80	82	.494	16	43‍–‍38	37‍–‍44
Baltimore Orioles	77	85	.475	19	44‍–‍38	33‍–‍47
Boston Red Sox	76	84	.475	19	39‍–‍40	37‍–‍44
Kansas City Athletics	72	90	.444	24	39‍–‍42	33‍–‍48
Washington Senators	60	101	.373	35½	27‍–‍53	33‍–‍48

=== Record vs. opponents ===
1962 American League record Sources:
Team	BAL	BOS	CWS	CLE	DET	KCA	LAA	MIN	NYY	WAS
Baltimore	—	8–10	9–9	11–7	2–16	10–8	8–10	6–12	11–7	12–6
Boston	10–8	—	8–10	7–11	11–6	10–8	6–12	10–8	6–12	8–9
Chicago	9–9	10–8	—	12–6	9–9	9–9	10–8	8–10	8–10	10–8
Cleveland	7–11	11–7	6–12	—	10–8	11–7	9–9	6–12	11–7	9–9
Detroit	16–2	6–11	9–9	8–10	—	12–6	11–7	5–13	7–11	11–7
Kansas City	8–10	8–10	9–9	7–11	6–12	—	6–12	8–10	5–13	15–3
Los Angeles	10–8	12–6	8–10	9–9	7–11	12–6	—	9–9	8–10	11–7
Minnesota	12–6	8–10	10–8	12–6	13–5	10–8	9–9	—	7–11	10–8–1
New York	7–11	12–6	10–8	7–11	11–7	13–5	10–8	11–7	—	15–3
Washington	6–12	9–8	8–10	9–9	7–11	3–15	7–11	8–10–1	3–15	—

=== Notable transactions ===
- September 8, 1962: Art Fowler was released by the Angels.

=== Roster ===
1962 Los Angeles Angels
Roster
Pitchers: 36 Bo Belinsky; 22 Bob Botz; 43 Ted Bowsfield; 31 Dean Chance; 34 Bobby Darwin; 40 Jim Donohue; 30 Ryne Duren; 24 Art Fowler; 33 Eli Grba; 48 Don Lee; 37 Ken McBride; 47 Tom Morgan; 35 Julio Navarro; 17 Fred Newman; 39 Joe Nuxhall; 40 Dan Osinski; 41 Jack Spring; 48 George Witt	Catchers: 39 Ed Kirkpatrick; 7 Buck Rodgers; 6 Ed Sadowski; Infielders: 20 Steve Bilko; 15 Tom Burgess; 11 Billy Consolo; 14 Marlan Coughtry; 11,16 Jim Fregosi; 26 Ken Hunt; 1 Joe Koppe; 14 Gene Leek; 2 Frank Leja; 12 Billy Moran; 29 Tom Satriano; 32 Lee Thomas; 19 Félix Torres; 23 Eddie Yost	Outfielders: 8 Earl Averill; 16 Leo Burke; 28 Albie Pearson; 10 Dick Simpson; 11 Chuck Tanner; 4 George Thomas; 27 Leon Wagner; 14,35 Gordie Windhorn	Manager: 18 Bill Rigney; Coaches: 21 Rocky Bridges; 5 Marv Grissom; 3 Jack Paepke; 9 Del Rice; 23 Eddie Yost

== Player stats ==
= Indicates team leader

=== Batting ===
==== Starters by position ====
Note: Pos = Position; G = Games played; AB = At bats; H = Hits; Avg. = Batting average; HR = Home runs; RBI = Runs batted in

Pos	Player	G	AB	H	Avg.	HR	RBI
C	Buck Rodgers	155	565	146	.258	6	61
1B	Lee Thomas	160	583	169	.290	26	104
2B	Billy Moran	160	659	186	.282	17	74
SS	Joe Koppe	128	375	85	.227	4	40
3B	Félix Torres	127	451	117	.259	11	74
LF	Leon Wagner	160	612	164	.268	37	107
CF	Albie Pearson	160	614	160	.261	5	42
RF	George Thomas	56	181	43	.238	4	12

==== Other batters ====
Note: G = Games played; AB = At bats; H = Hits; Avg. = Batting average; HR = Home runs; RBI = Runs batted in

Player	G	AB	H	Avg.	HR	RBI
Earl Averill Jr.	92	187	41	.219	4	22
Jim Fregosi	58	175	51	.291	3	23
Steve Bilko	64	164	47	.287	8	38
Tom Burgess	87	143	28	.196	2	13
Eddie Yost	52	104	25	.240	0	10
Leo Burke	19	64	17	.266	4	14
Ed Sadowski	27	55	11	.200	1	3
Gordie Windhorn	40	45	8	.178	0	1
Marlan Coughtry	11	22	4	.182	0	2
Billy Consolo	28	20	2	.100	0	0
Tom Satriano	10	19	8	.421	2	6
Frank Leja	7	16	0	.000	0	0
Gene Leek	7	14	2	.143	0	0
Ken Hunt	13	11	2	.182	1	1
Dick Simpson	6	8	2	.250	0	1
Chuck Tanner	7	8	1	.125	0	0
Ed Kirkpatrick	3	6	0	.000	0	0

=== Pitching ===
==== Starting pitchers ====
Note: G = Games pitched; IP = Innings pitched; W = Wins; L = Losses; ERA = Earned run average; SO = Strikeouts

Player	G	IP	W	L	ERA	SO
Bo Belinsky	33	187.1	10	11	3.56	145
Eli Grba	40	176.1	8	9	4.54	90
Don Lee	27	153.1	8	8	3.11	74
Ken McBride	24	149.1	11	5	3.50	83
Ted Bowsfield	34	139.0	9	8	4.40	52
Bobby Darwin	1	3.1	0	1	10.80	6

==== Other pitchers ====
Note: G = Games pitched; IP = Innings pitched; W = Wins; L = Losses; ERA = Earned run average; SO = Strikeouts

Player	G	IP	W	L	ERA	SO
Dean Chance	50	206.2	14	10	2.96	127
George Witt	5	10.0	1	1	8.10	10
Fred Newman	4	6.1	0	1	9.95	4

==== Relief pitchers ====
Note: G = Games pitched; W = Wins; L = Losses; SV = Saves; ERA = Earned run average; SO = Strikeouts

Player	G	W	L	SV	ERA	SO
Tom Morgan	48	5	2	9	2.91	29
Jack Spring	57	4	2	6	4.02	31
Art Fowler	48	4	3	5	2.81	38
Ryne Duren	42	2	9	8	4.42	74
Bob Botz	35	2	1	2	3.43	24
Dan Osinski	33	6	4	4	2.82	44
Jim Donohue	12	1	0	0	3.70	14
Julio Navarro	9	1	1	0	4.70	11
Joe Nuxhall	5	0	0	0	10.13	2

== Awards and honors ==
- Bill Rigney, Associated Press AL Manager of the Year

== Farm system ==
Level	Team	League	Manager
AAA	Dallas-Fort Worth Rangers	American Association	Dick Littlefield and Ray Murray
AAA	Hawaii Islanders	Pacific Coast League	Irv Noren
C	San Jose Bees	California League	Red Marion
D	Quad Cities Angels	Midwest League	John Fitzpatrick

LEAGUE CHAMPIONS: San Jose
Dallas-Fort Worth affiliation shared with Philadelphia Phillies

Records
Preceded by 1961	Los Angeles Angels seasons 1962	Succeeded by 1963
