= 1962 New York Yankees season =

Season for the Major League Baseball team the New York Yankees

1962 New York Yankees
- World Series champions American League champions
- League: American League
- Ballpark: Yankee Stadium
- City: New York City
- Record: 96–66 (.593)
- League place: 1st
- Owners: Dan Topping and Del Webb
- General managers: Roy Hamey
- Managers: Ralph Houk
- Television: WPIX–TV 11 (Mel Allen, Red Barber, Phil Rizzuto)
- Radio: WCBS–AM 880 (Mel Allen, Red Barber, Phil Rizzuto)

The 1962 New York Yankees season was the 60th season for the team. The team finished with a record of 96–66, winning their 27th pennant, finishing 5 games ahead of the Minnesota Twins. New York was managed by Ralph Houk. The Yankees played at Yankee Stadium. In the World Series, they defeated the San Francisco Giants in 7 games. It was their 20th World Championship in franchise history, and their last until 1977.

== Offseason ==
- December 14, 1961: Jesse Gonder was traded by the Yankees to the Cincinnati Reds for Marshall Bridges.

== Regular season ==
- May 22, 1962: Roger Maris drew four intentional walks in a game.
- September 11, 1962: Former Ole Miss football quarterback Jake Gibbs made his Major League Baseball debut with the Yankees.

=== Season standings ===
American League
Team	W	L	Pct.	GB	Home	Road
New York Yankees	96	66	.593	—	50‍–‍30	46‍–‍36
Minnesota Twins	91	71	.562	5	45‍–‍36	46‍–‍35
Los Angeles Angels	86	76	.531	10	40‍–‍41	46‍–‍35
Detroit Tigers	85	76	.528	10½	49‍–‍33	36‍–‍43
Chicago White Sox	85	77	.525	11	43‍–‍38	42‍–‍39
Cleveland Indians	80	82	.494	16	43‍–‍38	37‍–‍44
Baltimore Orioles	77	85	.475	19	44‍–‍38	33‍–‍47
Boston Red Sox	76	84	.475	19	39‍–‍40	37‍–‍44
Kansas City Athletics	72	90	.444	24	39‍–‍42	33‍–‍48
Washington Senators	60	101	.373	35½	27‍–‍53	33‍–‍48

=== Record vs. opponents ===
1962 American League record Sources:
Team	BAL	BOS	CWS	CLE	DET	KCA	LAA	MIN	NYY	WAS
Baltimore	—	8–10	9–9	11–7	2–16	10–8	8–10	6–12	11–7	12–6
Boston	10–8	—	8–10	7–11	11–6	10–8	6–12	10–8	6–12	8–9
Chicago	9–9	10–8	—	12–6	9–9	9–9	10–8	8–10	8–10	10–8
Cleveland	7–11	11–7	6–12	—	10–8	11–7	9–9	6–12	11–7	9–9
Detroit	16–2	6–11	9–9	8–10	—	12–6	11–7	5–13	7–11	11–7
Kansas City	8–10	8–10	9–9	7–11	6–12	—	6–12	8–10	5–13	15–3
Los Angeles	10–8	12–6	8–10	9–9	7–11	12–6	—	9–9	8–10	11–7
Minnesota	12–6	8–10	10–8	12–6	13–5	10–8	9–9	—	7–11	10–8–1
New York	7–11	12–6	10–8	7–11	11–7	13–5	10–8	11–7	—	15–3
Washington	6–12	9–8	8–10	9–9	7–11	3–15	7–11	8–10–1	3–15	—

=== Notable transactions ===
- June 26, 1962: Bob Cerv was purchased from the Yankees by the Houston Colt .45s.

=== Roster ===
1962 New York Yankees
Roster
Pitchers: 47 Luis Arroyo; 56 Jim Bouton; 30 Marshall Bridges; 29 Hal Brown; 21,26 Tex Clevenger; 39 Jim Coates; 40 Jack Cullen; 28 Bud Daley; 24 Al Downing; 16 Whitey Ford; 18 Hal Reniff; 45 Rollie Sheldon; 22 Bill Stafford; 23 Ralph Terry; 19 Bob Turley	Catchers: 8 Yogi Berra; 32 Elston Howard; Infielders: 6 Clete Boyer; 12 Billy Gardner; 41 Jake Gibbs; 10 Tony Kubek; 34 Phil Linz; 26 Dale Long; 1 Bobby Richardson; 14 Bill Skowron; 15 Tom Tresh	Outfielders: 38 Johnny Blanchard; 17 Bob Cerv; 11 Héctor López; 7 Mickey Mantle; 9 Roger Maris; 25 Joe Pepitone; 27 Jack Reed	Manager: 35 Ralph Houk; Coaches: 2 Frankie Crosetti (Third base); 44 Jim Hegan (Bullpen); 36 Wally Moses (First base/Hitting); 31 Johnny Sain (Pitching)

== Game log ==
=== Regular season ===
Legend
	Yankees win
	Yankees loss
	Yankees tie
	Postponement
	Clinched pennant
**Bold**	Yankees team member

1962 regular season game log: 96–66 (Home: 50–30; Away: 46–36)
April: 10–5 (Home: 3–3; Away: 7–2)

#	Date	Time (ET)	Opponent	Score	Win	Loss	Save	Time of Game	Attendance	Record	Box/ Streak

May: 15–13 (Home: 9–6; Away: 6–7)

#	Date	Time (ET)	Opponent	Score	Win	Loss	Save	Time of Game	Attendance	Record	Box/ Streak
30	May 18	8:02 p.m. EST	Twins	L 3–4	Lee (3–2)	**Ford** (3–3)	Stigman (1)	2:21	20,974	18–12	L1
31	May 19	2:02 p.m. EST	Twins	**W** 2–1	**Terry** (5–4)	Bonikowski (3–2)	—	2:05	13,896	19–12	W1
32 (1)	May 20	2:03 p.m. EST	Twins	**W** 4–3	**Coates** (3–0)	Moore (1–1)	—	2:23	—	20–12	W2
33 (2)	May 20	4:55 p.m. EST	Twins	L 2–4 (13)	Moore (2–1)	**Coates** (3–1)	Stigman (2)	3:51	27,998	20–13	L1
34	May 22	8:03 p.m. EST	Angels	**W** 2–1 (12)	**Turley** (2–0)	Morgan (0–1)	—	2:54	13,841	21–13	W1
42 (1)	May 30	12:04 p.m. EST	@ Twins	**W** 10–1	**Stafford** (4–3)	Bonikowski (3–4)	—	2:41	39,720	25–17	W1
43 (2)	May 30	9:04 p.m. EST	@ Twins	L 4–5 (11)	Stigman (3–1)	**Coates** (4–2)	—	3:11	35,635	25–18	L1

June: 14–13 (Home: 8–5; Away: 6–8)

#	Date	Time (ET)	Opponent	Score	Win	Loss	Save	Time of Game	Attendance	Record	Box/ Streak
44	June 1	11:01 p.m.	@ Angels	**W** 6–2	**Terry** (6–4)	Belinsky (6–2)	—	2:21	51,582	26–18	W1
45	June 2	11:01 p.m.	@ Angels	L 1–6	McBride (4–3)	**Ford** (3–4)	—	1:57	50,127	26–19	L1
46	June 3	4:34 p.m.	@ Angels	**W** 6–3	**Sheldon** (3–2)	Grba (2–2)	**Bridges** (4)	2:17	44,912	27–19	W1
66	June 26	8:01 p.m. EST	Twins	L 0–5	Pascual (11–4)	**Sheldon** (4–4)	—	2:41	28,051	36–30	L1
67	June 27	2:02 p.m. EST	Twins	**W** 7–3	**Terry** (9–7)	Kaat (8–5)	—	2:34	18,312	37–30	W1
68	June 28	2:03 p.m. EST	Twins	**W** 4–2	**Stafford** (7–5)	Karlick (5–7)	**Bridges** (9)	2:45	18,539	38–30	W2
69	June 29	8:01 p.m.	Angels	**W** 6–3	**Ford** (6–4)	Spring (4–2)	—	2:10	28,007	39–30	W3
70	June 30	2:02 p.m.	Angels	L 3–5	Bowsfield (3–3)	**Daley** (2–2)	Chance (3)	2:23	17,894	39–31	L1

July: 23–8 (Home: 12–6; Away: 11–2)

#	Date	Time (ET)	Opponent	Score	Win	Loss	Save	Time of Game	Attendance	Record	Box/ Streak
71 (1)	July 1	2:02 p.m.	Angels	**W** 6–3	**Terry** (10–7)	Lee (6–5)	**Arroyo** (4)	2:29	—	40–31	W1
72 (2)	July 1	5:01 p.m.	Angels	L 5–12	Fowler (3–3)	**Coates** (5–5)	—	3:24	35,884	40–32	L1
77	July 6	9:04 p.m. EST	@ Twins	**W** 7–5	**Terry** (11–7)	Pascual (12–5)	**Arroyo** (5)	2:50	40,944	44–33	W2
78	July 7	2:15 p.m. EST	@ Twins	**W** 6–3	**Stafford** (8–5)	Kralick (6–8)	**Bridges** (11)	2:43	39,665	45–33	W3
79	July 8	2:15 p.m. EST	@ Twins	**W** 9–8	**Ford** (7–4)	Kaat (8–8)	**Arroyo** (6)	2:44	40,347	46–33	W4
—	July 10		**32nd All-Star Game in Washington, D.C.**								
80	July 12	11:01 p.m. EST	@ Angels	L 4–5	Bowsfield (5–3)	**Ford** (7–5)	Chance (5)	1:48	40,259	46–34	L1
81	July 13	11:01 p.m. EST	@ Angels	L 2–5	McBride (9–3)	**Terry** (11–8)	—	2:22	53,591	46–35	L2
82	July 14	11:01 p.m. EST	@ Angels	**W** 9–8 (10)	**Bridges** (2–0)	Chance (6–5)	—	3:07	38,678	47–35	W1
—	July 30		**33rd All-Star Game in Chicago, IL**								

August: 17–18 (Home: 8–5; Away: 97–13)

#	Date	Time (ET)	Opponent	Score	Win	Loss	Save	Time of Game	Attendance	Record	Box/ Streak
107	August 6	2:49 p.m. EST	Twins	L 4–5	Stigman (6–3)	**Sheldon** (6–7)	Sullivan (3)	2:35	25,282	65–42	L3
108	August 7	8:00 p.m. EST	Twins	**W** 14–1	**Terry** (16–9)	Pascual (15–7)	—	2:13	17,703	66–42	W1
115	August 13	9:04 p.m. EST	@ Twins	L 4–6	Moore (8–3)	**Daley** (5–3)	Sullivan (4)	2:15	44,366	70–45	L1
116	August 14	9:04 p.m. EST	@ Twins	**W** 5–2	**Ford** (13–5)	Pleis (2–2)	—	2:28	41,207	71–45	W1
117	August 15	9:04 p.m. EST	@ Twins	**W** 9–3	**Terry** (17–10)	Kaat (12–11)	—	2:00	41,536	72–45	W2
118	August 16	12:04 p.m. EST	@ Twins	L 8–9 (10)	Sullivan (3–0)	**Bridges** (6–1)	—	3:05	41,588	72–46	L1
124	August 21	11:01 p.m. EST	@ Angels	**W** 11–4 (10)	**Daley** (6–3)	Duren (2–9)	—	3:32	50,830	75–49	W1
125	August 22	11:01 p.m. EST	@ Angels	**W** 4–3	**Sheldon** (7–8)	Osinski (3–2)	**Bridges** (16)	2:25	39,389	76–49	W2
126	August 23	11:01 p.m. EST	@ Angels	L 4–5 (13)	Osinski (4–2)	**Stafford** (10–8)	—	3:51	34,133	76–50	L1

September: 17–9 (Home: 10–5; Away: 7–4)

#	Date	Time (ET)	Opponent	Score	Win	Loss	Save	Time of Game	Attendance	Record	Box/ Streak
140 (1)	September 3	1:34 p.m. EST	Angels	**W** 8–2	**Stafford** (12–8)	Belinsky (8–9)	**Bridges** (18)	2:41	—	80–52	W4
140 (2)	September 3	4:48 p.m. EST	Angels	L 5–6	Morgan (2–9)	**Arroyo** (1–3)	Osinski (4)	2:44	56,964	80–53	L1
141	September 4	2:02 p.m. EST	Angels	L 6–7	Navarro (1–0)	**Daley** (7–5)	—	2:43	17,968	80–54	L2
—	September 5	8:00 p.m. EST	Angels	**Postponed (Rain)** (Makeup date: September 6)							
142	September 6	2:03 p.m. EST	Angels	**W** 6–5	**Coates** (7–6)	Chance (12–8)	—	2:16	13,491	81–54	W1

=== Detailed records ===
American League
Opponent	W	L	WP	RS	RA
Los Angeles Angels	10	8	0.556	94	85
Minnesota Twins	11	7	0.611	102	70
**New York Yankees**					
Season Total	21	15	0.583	196	155

Month	Games	Won	Lost	Win %	RS	RA
April	15	10	5	0.667	85	66
May	28	15	13	0.536	125	111
June	27	14	13	0.519	103	101
July	31	23	8	0.742	181	145
August	35	17	18	0.486	182	147
September	26	17	9	0.654	141	110
Total	162	96	66	0.593	817	680

	Games	Won	Lost	Win %	RS	RA
Home	80	50	30	0.625	369	306
Away	82	46	36	0.561	448	374
Total	162	96	66	0.593	817	680

=== Postseason Game log ===
Legend
	Yankees win
	Yankees loss
	Postponement
**Bold**	Yankees team member

1962 Postseason game log: 4–3 (Home: 2–1; Away: 2–2)
World Series vs San Francisco Giants (Home: 2–1; Away: 2–2)

#	Date	Time (ET)	Opponent	Score	Win	Loss	Save	Time of Game	Attendance	Series	Box/ Streak
1	October 4	3:00 p.m. EST	@ Giants	**W** 6–2	**Ford** (1–0)	O'Dell (0–1)	—	2:43	43,852	NYA 1–0	W1
2	October 5	3:00 p.m. EST	@ Giants	L 0–2	Sanford (1–0)	Terry (0–1)	—	2:11	43,910	Tied 1–1	L1
3	October 7	2:00 p.m. EST	Giants	**W** 3–2	Stafford (1–0)	Pierce (0–1)	—	2:06	71,434	NYA 2–1	W1
4	October 8	1:00 p.m. EST	Giants	L 3–7	Larsen (1–0)	Coates (0–1)	O'Dell (1)	2:55	66,607	Tied 2–2	L1
—	October 9	1:00 p.m. EST	Giants	**Postponed (Rain)** (Makeup date: October 10)							
5	October 10	1:00 p.m. EST	Giants	**W** 5–3	Terry (1–1)	Sanford (1–1)	—	2:42	63,165	NYA 3–2	W1
—	October 12	3:00 p.m. EST	@ Giants	**Postponed (Rain)** (Makeup date: October 15)							
—	October 13	3:00 p.m. EST	@ Giants	**Postponed (Rain)** (Makeup date: October 15)							
—	October 14	3:00 p.m. EST	@ Giants	**Postponed (Rain)** (Makeup date: October 15)							
6	October 15	3:00 p.m. EST	@ Giants	L 2–5	Pierce (1–1)	**Ford** (1–1)	—	2:00	43,948	Tied 3–3	L1
7	October 16	3:00 p.m. EST	@ Giants	**W** 1–0	Terry (2–1)	Sanford (1–2)	—	2:29	43,948	NYA 4–3	W1

== Player stats ==
= Indicates team leader

= Indicates league leader

=== Batting ===
==== Starters by position ====
Note: Pos = Position; G = Games played; AB = At bats; H = Hits; Avg. = Batting average; HR = Home runs; RBI = Runs batted in

Pos.	Player	G	AB	H	Avg.	HR	RBI
C	Elston Howard	136	494	138	.279	21	91
1B	Bill Skowron	140	478	129	.270	23	80
2B	Bobby Richardson	161	692	209	.302	8	59
3B	Clete Boyer	158	566	154	.272	18	68
SS	Tom Tresh	157	622	178	.286	20	93
LF	Héctor López	106	335	92	.275	6	48
CF	Mickey Mantle	123	377	121	.321	30	89
RF	Roger Maris	157	590	151	.256	33	100

==== Other batters ====
Note: G = Games played; AB = At bats; H = Hits; Avg. = Batting average; HR = Home runs; RBI = Runs batted in

Player	G	AB	H	Avg.	HR	RBI
Johnny Blanchard	93	246	57	.232	13	39
Yogi Berra	86	232	52	.224	10	35
Tony Kubek	45	169	53	.314	4	17
Joe Pepitone	63	138	33	.239	7	17
Phil Linz	71	129	37	.287	1	14
Dale Long	41	94	28	.298	4	17
Jack Reed	88	43	13	.302	1	4
Bob Cerv	14	17	2	.118	0	0
Billy Gardner	4	1	0	.000	0	0
Jake Gibbs	2	0	0	----	0	0

=== Pitching ===
==== Starting pitchers ====
Note: G = Games pitched; IP = Innings pitched; W = Wins; L = Losses; ERA = Earned run average; SO = Strikeouts

Player	G	IP	W	L	ERA	SO
Ralph Terry	43	298.2	23	12	3.19	176
Whitey Ford	38	257.2	17	8	2.90	160
Bill Stafford	35	213.1	14	9	3.67	109

==== Other pitchers ====
Note: G = Games pitched; IP = Innings pitched; W = Wins; L = Losses; ERA = Earned run average; SO = Strikeouts

Player	G	IP	W	L	ERA	SO
Jim Bouton	36	133.0	7	7	3.99	71
Rollie Sheldon	34	118.0	7	8	5.49	54
Bob Turley	24	69.0	3	3	4.57	42
Hal Brown	2	6.2	0	1	6.75	2

==== Relief pitchers ====
Note: G = Games pitched; W = Wins; L = Losses; SV = Saves; ERA = Earned run average; SO = Strikeouts

Player	G	W	L	SV	ERA	SO
Marshall Bridges	52	8	4	18	3.14	66
Jim Coates	50	7	6	6	4.44	67
Bud Daley	43	7	5	4	3.59	55
Luis Arroyo	27	1	3	7	4.81	21
Tex Clevenger	21	2	0	0	2.84	11
Hal Reniff	2	0	0	0	7.36	1
Jack Cullen	2	0	0	1	0.00	2
Al Downing	1	0	0	0	0.00	1

== 1962 World Series ==
AL New York Yankees (4) vs. NL San Francisco Giants (3)

Game	Score	Date	Location	Attendance
1	Yankees – 6, Giants – 2	October 4	Candlestick Park	43,852
2	Yankees – 0, Giants – 2	October 5	Candlestick Park	43,910
3	Giants – 2, Yankees – 3	October 7	Yankee Stadium	71,434
4	Giants – 7, Yankees – 3	October 8	Yankee Stadium	66,607
5	Giants – 3, Yankees – 5	October 10	Yankee Stadium	63,165
6	Yankees – 2, Giants – 5	October 15	Candlestick Park	43,948
7	Yankees – 1, Giants – 0	October 16	Candlestick Park	43,948

== Awards and honors ==
- Mickey Mantle, American League MVP
- Ralph Terry, Babe Ruth Award

All-Star Game (first game) All-Star Game (second game)

- Elston Howard, All-Star Game

== Farm system ==
Level	Team	League	Manager
AAA	Richmond Virginians	International League	Sheriff Robinson
AA	Amarillo Gold Sox	Texas League	Rube Walker
A	Augusta Yankees	Sally League	Ernie White
B	Greensboro Yankees	Carolina League	Vern Rapp and Steve Souchock
C	Idaho Falls Yankees	Pioneer League	Loren Babe
D	Harlan Smokies	Appalachian League	Chips Sobek and Lamar North
D	Fort Lauderdale Yankees	Florida State League	Bob Bauer
D	Shelby Colonels	Western Carolinas League	Joe Abernethy and Cloyd Boyer

LEAGUE CHAMPIONS: Fort Lauderdale

Harlan affiliation shared with Chicago White Sox
