= 1962 Baltimore Orioles season =

Major League Baseball season

1962 Baltimore Orioles
- League: American League
- Ballpark: Memorial Stadium
- City: Baltimore, Maryland
- Record: 77–85 (.475)
- League place: 7th
- Owners: Jerold Hoffberger, Joseph Iglehart
- General managers: Lee MacPhail
- Managers: Billy Hitchcock
- Television: WBAL-TV
- Radio: WBAL (AM) (Chuck Thompson, Jack Dunn, Bailey Goss)

The 1962 Baltimore Orioles season involved the Orioles finishing seventh in the American League with a record of 77 wins and 85 losses.

== Offseason ==
- October 9, 1961: Dave Philley was released by the Orioles.
- November 16, 1961: Harry Chiti, Ray Barker and Art Kay (minors) were traded by the Orioles to the Cleveland Indians for Johnny Temple.
- November 27, 1961: 1961 rule 5 draft
  - Bo Belinsky was drafted from the Orioles by the Los Angeles Angels.
  - John Anderson was drafted from the Orioles by the St. Louis Cardinals.

== Regular season ==
=== Season standings ===
American League
Team	W	L	Pct.	GB	Home	Road
New York Yankees	96	66	.593	—	50‍–‍30	46‍–‍36
Minnesota Twins	91	71	.562	5	45‍–‍36	46‍–‍35
Los Angeles Angels	86	76	.531	10	40‍–‍41	46‍–‍35
Detroit Tigers	85	76	.528	10½	49‍–‍33	36‍–‍43
Chicago White Sox	85	77	.525	11	43‍–‍38	42‍–‍39
Cleveland Indians	80	82	.494	16	43‍–‍38	37‍–‍44
Baltimore Orioles	77	85	.475	19	44‍–‍38	33‍–‍47
Boston Red Sox	76	84	.475	19	39‍–‍40	37‍–‍44
Kansas City Athletics	72	90	.444	24	39‍–‍42	33‍–‍48
Washington Senators	60	101	.373	35½	27‍–‍53	33‍–‍48

=== Record vs. opponents ===
1962 American League record Sources:
Team	BAL	BOS	CWS	CLE	DET	KCA	LAA	MIN	NYY	WAS
Baltimore	—	8–10	9–9	11–7	2–16	10–8	8–10	6–12	11–7	12–6
Boston	10–8	—	8–10	7–11	11–6	10–8	6–12	10–8	6–12	8–9
Chicago	9–9	10–8	—	12–6	9–9	9–9	10–8	8–10	8–10	10–8
Cleveland	7–11	11–7	6–12	—	10–8	11–7	9–9	6–12	11–7	9–9
Detroit	16–2	6–11	9–9	8–10	—	12–6	11–7	5–13	7–11	11–7
Kansas City	8–10	8–10	9–9	7–11	6–12	—	6–12	8–10	5–13	15–3
Los Angeles	10–8	12–6	8–10	9–9	7–11	12–6	—	9–9	8–10	11–7
Minnesota	12–6	8–10	10–8	12–6	13–5	10–8	9–9	—	7–11	10–8–1
New York	7–11	12–6	10–8	7–11	11–7	13–5	10–8	11–7	—	15–3
Washington	6–12	9–8	8–10	9–9	7–11	3–15	7–11	8–10–1	3–15	—

=== Notable transactions ===
- April 24, 1962: Darrell Johnson was signed by Orioles as a free agent.
- May 9, 1962: Marv Throneberry was sold by the Orioles to the New York Mets.
- June 7, 1962 The New York Mets sell Hobie Landrith to the Orioles.
- June 19, 1962: Mark Belanger was signed as an amateur free agent by the Orioles.
- August 11, 1962: Johnny Temple was acquired from the Orioles by the Houston Colt .45s in exchange for cash.
- September 7, 1962: Hal Brown was acquired from the Orioles by the New York Yankees in exchange for cash.

=== Roster ===
1962 Baltimore Orioles
Roster
Pitchers: 13 Steve Barber; 28 Hal Brown; 23 Chuck Estrada; 22 Jack Fisher; 29 Dick Hall; 20 Billy Hoeft; 38 Jim Lehew; 26 Dick Luebke; 19 Dave McNally; 17 John Miller; 39 John Papa; 32 Milt Pappas; 27 Art Quirk; 38 Robin Roberts; 30 Bill Short; 18 Wes Stock; 15 Hoyt Wilhelm	Catchers: 8 Andy Etchebarren; 36 Darrell Johnson; 30 Hobie Landrith; 44 Charley Lau; 27 Nate Smith; 11 Gus Triandos; Infielders: 7 Jerry Adair; 1 Marv Breeding; 4 Jim Gentile; 3 Ron Hansen; 34 Mickey McGuire; 5 Brooks Robinson; 2 Bob Saverine; 2 Johnny Temple	Outfielders: 25 Jackie Brandt; 6 Whitey Herzog; 33 Dave Nicholson; 16 Boog Powell; 14 Earl Robinson; 40 Barry Shetrone; 9 Russ Snyder; 8 Marv Throneberry; 28 Pete Ward; 10 Dick Williams; Other batters: 34 Ozzie Virgil	Manager: 45 Billy Hitchcock; Coaches: 31 Harry Brecheen; 42 Cal Ermer; 36 Darrell Johnson; 41 George Staller

== Player stats ==
= Indicates team leader

=== Batting ===
==== Starters by position ====
Note: Pos = Position; G = Games played; AB = At bats; H = Hits; Avg. = Batting average; HR = Home runs; RBI = Runs batted in

Pos	Player	G	AB	H	Avg.	HR	RBI
C	Gus Triandos	66	207	33	.159	6	23
1B	Jim Gentile	152	545	137	.251	33	87
2B	Johnny Temple	78	270	71	.263	1	17
3B	Brooks Robinson	162	634	192	.303	23	86
SS	Jerry Adair	139	538	153	.284	11	48
LF	Boog Powell	124	400	97	.243	15	53
CF	Jackie Brandt	143	505	129	.255	19	75
RF	Whitey Herzog	99	263	70	.266	7	35

==== Other batters ====
Note: G = Games played; AB = At bats; H = Hits; Avg. = Batting average; HR = Home runs; RBI = Runs batted in

Player	G	AB	H	Avg.	HR	RBI
Russ Snyder	139	416	127	.305	9	40
Marv Breeding	95	240	59	.246	2	18
Charley Lau	81	197	58	.294	6	37
Ron Hansen	71	196	34	.173	3	17
Dick Williams	82	178	44	.247	1	18
Dave Nicholson	97	173	30	.173	9	15
Hobie Landrith	60	167	37	.222	4	17
Earl Robinson	29	63	18	.286	1	4
Barry Shetrone	21	24	6	.250	1	1
Darrell Johnson	6	22	4	.182	0	1
Bob Saverine	8	21	5	.238	0	3
Pete Ward	8	21	3	.143	0	2
Marv Throneberry	9	9	0	.000	0	0
Nate Smith	5	9	2	.222	0	0
Andy Etchebarren	2	6	2	.333	0	1
Mickey McGuire	6	4	0	.000	0	0
Ozzie Virgil	1	1	0	.000	0	0

=== Pitching ===
= Indicates league leader

==== Starting pitchers ====
Note: G = Games pitched; IP = Innings pitched; W = Wins; L = Losses; ERA = Earned run average; SO = Strikeouts

Player	G	IP	W	L	ERA	SO
Chuck Estrada	34	223.1	9	17	3.83	165
Milt Pappas	35	205.1	12	10	4.03	130
Robin Roberts	27	191.1	10	9	2.78	102
Jack Fisher	32	152.0	7	9	5.09	81
Steve Barber	28	140.1	9	6	3.46	89
Art Quirk	7	27.1	2	2	5.93	18
Dave McNally	1	9.0	1	0	0.00	4

==== Other pitchers ====
Note: G = Games pitched; IP = Innings pitched; W = Wins; L = Losses; ERA = Earned run average; SO = Strikeouts

Player	G	IP	W	L	ERA	SO
Hal Brown	22	85.2	6	4	4.10	25
John Miller	2	10.0	1	1	0.90	4

==== Relief pitchers ====
Note: G = Games pitched; W = Wins; L = Losses; SV = Saves; ERA = Earned run average; SO = Strikeouts

Player	G	W	L	SV	ERA	SO
Hoyt Wilhelm	52	7	10	15	1.94	90
Billy Hoeft	57	4	8	7	4.59	73
Wes Stock	53	3	2	3	4.43	34
Dick Hall	43	6	6	6	2.28	71
Dick Luebke	10	0	1	0	2.70	7
Jim Lehew	6	0	0	0	1.86	2
Bill Short	5	0	0	0	15.75	3
John Papa	1	0	0	0	27.00	0

== Farm system ==
Level	Team	League	Manager
AAA	Rochester Red Wings	International League	Clyde King
A	Elmira Pioneers	Eastern League	Earl Weaver
C	Stockton Ports	California League	Harry Dunlop
C	Aberdeen Pheasants	Northern League	Billy DeMars
D	Bluefield Orioles	Appalachian League	Billy Hunter
D	Fox Cities Foxes	Midwest League	Cal Ripken Sr.

LEAGUE CHAMPIONS: Bluefield
