= 1962 Kansas City Athletics season =

1962 Kansas City Athletics
- League: American League
- Ballpark: Municipal Stadium
- City: Kansas City, Missouri
- Record: 72–90 (.444)
- League place: 9th
- Owners: Charles O. Finley
- General managers: Pat Friday
- Managers: Hank Bauer
- Television: KCMO-TV
- Radio: KCMO (AM) (Monte Moore, Bruce Rice)

The 1962 Kansas City Athletics season was the eighth season in Kansas City, and the 62nd in franchise history. It involved the Athletics finishing ninth in the American League with a record of 72 wins and 90 losses, 24 games behind the World Series Champion New York Yankees. The A's were last in the American League in paid attendance.

== Offseason ==
- October 11, 1961: Stan Johnson, Bobby Prescott and Jay Ward were traded by the Athletics to the Los Angeles Dodgers for Gordie Windhorn and Bill Lajoie (minors).
- December 15, 1961: Lou Klimchock and Bob Shaw were traded by the Athletics to the Milwaukee Braves for Joe Azcue, Ed Charles and Manny Jiménez.
- Prior to 1962 season: Don Williams was acquired by the Athletics from the Chicago White Sox.

== Regular season ==
- April 22, 1962: Future Basketball Hall of Famer Dave DeBusschere made his major league baseball debut for the Chicago White Sox in a game against the Athletics. He pitched one inning and gave up one base on balls.
- August 26, 1962: Jack Kralick threw the first no-hitter in Minnesota Twins history against the Athletics. The Twins beat the Athletics by a score of 1–0.

=== Season standings ===
American League
Team	W	L	Pct.	GB	Home	Road
New York Yankees	96	66	.593	—	50‍–‍30	46‍–‍36
Minnesota Twins	91	71	.562	5	45‍–‍36	46‍–‍35
Los Angeles Angels	86	76	.531	10	40‍–‍41	46‍–‍35
Detroit Tigers	85	76	.528	10½	49‍–‍33	36‍–‍43
Chicago White Sox	85	77	.525	11	43‍–‍38	42‍–‍39
Cleveland Indians	80	82	.494	16	43‍–‍38	37‍–‍44
Baltimore Orioles	77	85	.475	19	44‍–‍38	33‍–‍47
Boston Red Sox	76	84	.475	19	39‍–‍40	37‍–‍44
Kansas City Athletics	72	90	.444	24	39‍–‍42	33‍–‍48
Washington Senators	60	101	.373	35½	27‍–‍53	33‍–‍48

=== Record vs. opponents ===
1962 American League record Sources:
Team	BAL	BOS	CWS	CLE	DET	KCA	LAA	MIN	NYY	WAS
Baltimore	—	8–10	9–9	11–7	2–16	10–8	8–10	6–12	11–7	12–6
Boston	10–8	—	8–10	7–11	11–6	10–8	6–12	10–8	6–12	8–9
Chicago	9–9	10–8	—	12–6	9–9	9–9	10–8	8–10	8–10	10–8
Cleveland	7–11	11–7	6–12	—	10–8	11–7	9–9	6–12	11–7	9–9
Detroit	16–2	6–11	9–9	8–10	—	12–6	11–7	5–13	7–11	11–7
Kansas City	8–10	8–10	9–9	7–11	6–12	—	6–12	8–10	5–13	15–3
Los Angeles	10–8	12–6	8–10	9–9	7–11	12–6	—	9–9	8–10	11–7
Minnesota	12–6	8–10	10–8	12–6	13–5	10–8	9–9	—	7–11	10–8–1
New York	7–11	12–6	10–8	7–11	11–7	13–5	10–8	11–7	—	15–3
Washington	6–12	9–8	8–10	9–9	7–11	3–15	7–11	8–10–1	3–15	—

=== Roster ===
1962 Kansas City Athletics
Roster
Pitchers: 20 Jim Archer; 22 Norm Bass; 28 Art Ditmar; 25 Moe Drabowsky; 28 Bill Fischer; 22 Bob Giggie; 34 Bob Grim; 36 Granny Hamner; 34 Gordon Jones; 25 Bill Kunkel; 29 Danny McDevitt; 36 Fred Norman; 31 Dan Osinski; 19 Orlando Peña; 27 Dan Pfister; 21 Ed Rakow; 24 Diego Seguí; 31 Rupe Toppin; 23 Jerry Walker; 26 Dave Wickersham; 22 Don Williams; 33 John Wyatt	Catchers: 10 Joe Azcue; 18 Billy Bryan; 8 Haywood Sullivan; Infielders: 2 Wayne Causey; 16 Ed Charles; 6 Billy Consolo; 30 Marlan Coughtry; 1 Dick Howser; 14 Deron Johnson; 11 Jerry Lumpe; 29 Charlie Shoemaker; 7 Norm Siebern	Outfielders: 3 George Alusik; 4 Gino Cimoli; 5 Bobby Del Greco; 12 Manny Jiménez; 14 Bill Kern; 19 Leo Posada; 15 José Tartabull; 17 Gordie Windhorn; 17 John Wojcik; Other batters: 17 Héctor Martínez; 3 Gene Stephens	Manager: 9 Hank Bauer; Coaches: 40 Dario Lodigiani; 37 Eddie Lopat; 42 Gus Niarhos; 41 Jo-Jo White

== Player stats ==
=== Batting ===
==== Starters by position ====
Note: Pos = Position; G = Games played; AB = At bats; H = Hits; Avg. = Batting average; HR = Home runs; RBI = Runs batted in

Pos	Player	G	AB	H	Avg.	HR	RBI
C	Haywood Sullivan	95	274	68	.248	4	29
1B	Norm Siebern	162	600	185	.308	25	117
2B	Jerry Lumpe	156	641	193	.301	10	83
SS	Dick Howser	83	286	68	.238	6	34
3B	Ed Charles	147	535	154	.288	17	74
LF	Manny Jiménez	139	479	144	.301	11	69
CF	Bobby Del Greco	132	338	86	.254	9	38
RF	Gino Cimoli	152	550	151	.275	10	71

==== Other batters ====
Note: G = Games played; AB = At bats; H = Hits; Avg. = Batting average; HR = Home runs; RBI = Runs batted in

Player	G	AB	H	Avg.	HR	RBI
José Tartabull	107	310	86	.277	0	22
Wayne Causey	117	305	77	.252	4	38
Joe Azcue	72	223	51	.229	2	25
George Alusik	90	209	57	.273	11	35
Billy Consolo	54	154	37	.240	0	16
Billy Bryan	25	74	11	.149	2	7
Leo Posada	29	46	9	.196	0	3
John Wojcik	16	43	13	.302	0	9
Deron Johnson	17	19	2	.105	0	0
Gordie Windhorn	14	19	3	.158	0	1
Bill Kern	8	16	4	.250	1	1
Marlan Coughtry	6	11	2	.182	0	1
Charlie Shoemaker	5	11	2	.182	0	0
Gene Stephens	5	4	0	.000	0	0
Héctor Martínez	1	1	0	.000	0	0

=== Pitching ===
= Indicates league leader

==== Starting pitchers ====
Note: G = Games pitched; IP = Innings pitched; W = Wins; L = Losses; ERA = Earned run average; SO = Strikeouts

Player	G	IP	W	L	ERA	SO
Ed Rakow	42	235.1	14	17	4.25	159
Orlando Peña	13	89.2	6	4	3.01	56
Art Ditmar	6	21.2	0	2	6.65	13

==== Other pitchers ====
Note: G = Games pitched; IP = Innings pitched; W = Wins; L = Losses; ERA = Earned run average; SO = Strikeouts

Player	G	IP	W	L	ERA	SO
Dan Pfister	41	196.1	4	14	4.54	123
Jerry Walker	31	143.1	8	9	5.90	57
Bill Fischer	34	127.2	4	12	3.95	38
John Wyatt	59	125.0	10	7	4.46	106
Diego Seguí	37	116.2	8	5	3.86	71
Dave Wickersham	30	110.0	11	4	4.17	61
Norm Bass	22	75.1	2	6	6.09	33
Moe Drabowsky	10	28.0	1	1	5.14	19
Bob Giggie	4	14.1	1	1	6.28	4

==== Relief pitchers ====
Note: G = Games pitched; W = Wins; L = Losses; SV = Saves; ERA = Earned run average; SO = Strikeouts

Player	G	W	L	SV	ERA	SO
Gordon Jones	21	3	2	6	6.34	28
Danny McDevitt	33	0	3	2	5.82	28
Jim Archer	18	0	1	0	9.43	12
Bob Grim	12	0	1	3	6.23	3
Bill Kunkel	9	0	0	0	3.52	6
Dan Osinski	4	0	0	0	17.36	4
Don Williams	3	0	0	0	9.00	1
Granny Hamner	3	0	1	0	9.00	0
Fred Norman	2	0	0	0	2.25	2
Rupe Toppin	2	0	0	0	13.50	1

== Farm system ==
Level	Team	League	Manager
AAA	Portland Beavers	Pacific Coast League	Les Peden
AA	Albuquerque Dukes	Texas League	Bobby Hofman
A	Binghamton Triplets	Eastern League	Granny Hamner and Dan Carnevale
B	Lewiston Broncos	Northwest League	John McNamara
C	Minot Mallards	Northern League	Grady Wilson
D	Daytona Beach Islanders	Florida State League	Bill Robertson
