= 1962 Minnesota Twins season =

1962 Minnesota Twins
- League: American League
- Ballpark: Metropolitan Stadium
- City: Bloomington, Minnesota
- Record: 91–71 (.562)
- Divisional place: 2nd
- Owners: Calvin Griffith (majority owner, with Thelma Griffith Haynes)
- General managers: Calvin Griffith
- Managers: Sam Mele
- Television: WTCN-TV
- Radio: 830 WCCO AM (Ray Scott, Herb Carneal, Halsey Hall)

The 1962 Minnesota Twins season was the 2nd season for the Minnesota Twins franchise in the Twin Cities of Minnesota, their 2nd season at Metropolitan Stadium and the 62nd overall in the American League.

The Twins improved to 91–71, finishing second in the American League, five games short of the World Champion New York Yankees. 1,433,116 fans attended Twins games, the second highest total in the American League. It was the team's first winning record in 10 years, their last coming in 1952 when they were still known as the Washington Senators.

== Offseason ==
- November 27, 1961: Georges Maranda was drafted by the Twins from the San Francisco Giants in the 1961 rule 5 draft.
- Prior to the 1962 Season: Joe Foy was signed by the Minnesota Twins as an amateur free agent.

== Regular season ==
Statistically, many members of the Twins had seasons in which they led the American League. Harmon Killebrew hit 48 home runs and drove in 126, leading the AL in both categories. Bob Allison hit 29 home runs, drove in 102 runs, and led the Twins in runs scored with 102. Camilo Pascual became the Twins' first 20-game winner and led the AL with 206 strikeouts.

On July 18, at Metropolitan Stadium in Bloomington, Minnesota, two Twins made major league history by hitting grand slam home runs in the same inning. In the first inning -- off Cleveland Indians pitcher Barry Latman -- Bob Allison homered to clear the loaded bases. Indians pitcher Jim Perry subsequently replaced Latman, and Harmon Killebrew greeted him by driving in Bill Tuttle, Vic Power and Rich Rollins. Minnesota scored eleven runs in their half of the first inning.

Four Twins made the All-Star Game. The selections were third baseman Rich Rollins, catcher Earl Battey and pitchers Jim Kaat and Camilo Pascual.

On August 26, Jack Kralick threw the first no-hitter in Minnesota Twins history. The Twins beat the Kansas City Athletics by a score of 1–0.

First baseman Vic Power won his fifth Gold Glove, catcher Earl Battey won his third, and Jim Kaat won his first.

=== Season standings ===
American League
Team	W	L	Pct.	GB	Home	Road
New York Yankees	96	66	.593	—	50‍–‍30	46‍–‍36
Minnesota Twins	91	71	.562	5	45‍–‍36	46‍–‍35
Los Angeles Angels	86	76	.531	10	40‍–‍41	46‍–‍35
Detroit Tigers	85	76	.528	10½	49‍–‍33	36‍–‍43
Chicago White Sox	85	77	.525	11	43‍–‍38	42‍–‍39
Cleveland Indians	80	82	.494	16	43‍–‍38	37‍–‍44
Baltimore Orioles	77	85	.475	19	44‍–‍38	33‍–‍47
Boston Red Sox	76	84	.475	19	39‍–‍40	37‍–‍44
Kansas City Athletics	72	90	.444	24	39‍–‍42	33‍–‍48
Washington Senators	60	101	.373	35½	27‍–‍53	33‍–‍48

=== Record vs. opponents ===
1962 American League record Sources:
Team	BAL	BOS	CWS	CLE	DET	KCA	LAA	MIN	NYY	WAS
Baltimore	—	8–10	9–9	11–7	2–16	10–8	8–10	6–12	11–7	12–6
Boston	10–8	—	8–10	7–11	11–6	10–8	6–12	10–8	6–12	8–9
Chicago	9–9	10–8	—	12–6	9–9	9–9	10–8	8–10	8–10	10–8
Cleveland	7–11	11–7	6–12	—	10–8	11–7	9–9	6–12	11–7	9–9
Detroit	16–2	6–11	9–9	8–10	—	12–6	11–7	5–13	7–11	11–7
Kansas City	8–10	8–10	9–9	7–11	6–12	—	6–12	8–10	5–13	15–3
Los Angeles	10–8	12–6	8–10	9–9	7–11	12–6	—	9–9	8–10	11–7
Minnesota	12–6	8–10	10–8	12–6	13–5	10–8	9–9	—	7–11	10–8–1
New York	7–11	12–6	10–8	7–11	11–7	13–5	10–8	11–7	—	15–3
Washington	6–12	9–8	8–10	9–9	7–11	3–15	7–11	8–10–1	3–15	—

=== Notable transactions ===
- April 2, 1962: Pedro Ramos was traded by the Twins to the Cleveland Indians for Vic Power and Dick Stigman.
- April 3, 1962: Billy Martin was released by the Twins.
- August 20, 1962: Jackie Collum, a player to be named later and cash were traded by the Twins to the Cleveland Indians for Rubén Gómez. The Twins completed the deal by sending Georges Maranda to the Indians on October 9.

=== Roster ===
1962 Minnesota Twins
Roster
Pitchers: 46 Gerry Arrigo; 33 Joe Bonikowski; 33 Jackie Collum; 40 Jim Donohue; 27,33 Rubén Gómez; 36 Jim Kaat; 15 Jack Kralick; 20 Don Lee; 42 Jim Manning; 47 Georges Maranda; 21 Ray Moore; 17 Camilo Pascual; 19 Bill Pleis; 44 Jim Roland; 45 Ted Sadowski; 39 Lee Stange; 18 Dick Stigman; 20 Frank Sullivan	Catchers: 10 Earl Battey; 8 Hal Naragon; 22 Jerry Zimmerman; Infielders: 12 Bernie Allen; 16 Johnny Goryl; 38 Marty Martínez; 5 Don Mincher; 28 Vic Power; 9 Rich Rollins; 6 Jim Snyder; 2 Zoilo Versalles	Outfielders: 4 Bob Allison; 11 George Banks; 7 Lenny Green; 3 Harmon Killebrew; 23 Jim Lemon; 37 Tony Oliva; 13 Bill Tuttle	Manager: 14 Sam Mele; Coaches: 53 Floyd Baker; 52 Ed Fitz Gerald; 54 Gordon Maltzberger; 51 George Strickland

== Player stats ==
= Indicates team leader

= Indicates league leader

=== Batting ===
==== Starters by position ====
Note: Pos = Position; G = Games played; AB = At bats; H = Hits; Avg. = Batting average; HR = Home runs; RBI = Runs batted in

Pos	Player	G	AB	H	Avg.	HR	RBI
C	Earl Battey	148	522	146	.280	11	57
1B	Vic Power	144	611	177	.290	16	63
2B	Bernie Allen	159	573	154	.269	12	64
3B	Rich Rollins	159	624	186	.298	16	96
SS	Zoilo Versalles	160	568	137	.241	17	67
LF	Harmon Killebrew	155	552	134	.243	48	126
CF	Lenny Green	158	619	168	.271	14	63
RF	Bob Allison	149	519	138	.266	29	102

==== Other batters ====
Note: G = Games played; AB = At bats; H = Hits; Avg. = Batting average; HR = Home runs; RBI = Runs batted in

Player	G	AB	H	Avg.	HR	RBI
Bill Tuttle	110	123	26	.211	1	13
Don Mincher	86	121	29	.240	9	29
George Banks	63	103	26	.252	4	15
Jerry Zimmerman	34	62	17	.274	0	7
Hal Naragon	24	35	8	.229	0	3
Johnny Goryl	37	26	5	.192	2	2
Marty Martínez	37	18	3	.167	0	3
Jim Lemon	12	17	3	.176	1	5
Jim Snyder	12	10	1	.100	0	1
Tony Oliva	9	9	4	.444	0	3

=== Pitching ===
==== Starting pitchers ====
Note: G = Games pitched; IP = Innings pitched; W = Wins; L = Losses; ERA = Earned run average; SO = Strikeouts

Player	G	IP	W	L	ERA	SO
Jim Kaat	39	269.0	18	14	3.14	173
Camilo Pascual	34	257.2	20	11	3.32	206
Jack Kralick	39	242.2	12	11	3.86	139
Don Lee	9	52.0	3	3	4.50	28

==== Other pitchers ====
Note: G = Games pitched; IP = Innings pitched; W = Wins; L = Losses; ERA = Earned run average; SO = Strikeouts

Player	G	IP	W	L	ERA	SO
Dick Stigman	40	142.2	12	5	3.66	116
Joe Bonikowski	30	99.2	5	7	3.88	45
Rubén Gómez	6	19.1	1	1	4.66	8
Jackie Collum	8	15.1	0	2	11.15	5
Jim Donohue	6	10.1	0	1	6.97	3
Jim Manning	5	7.0	0	0	5.14	3

==== Relief pitchers ====
Note: G = Games pitched; W = Wins; L = Losses; SV = Saves; ERA = Earned run average; SO = Strikeouts

Player	G	W	L	SV	ERA	SO
Ray Moore	49	8	3	9	4.73	58
Lee Stange	44	4	3	3	4.45	70
Georges Maranda	32	1	3	0	4.46	36
Bill Pleis	21	2	5	3	4.40	31
Frank Sullivan	21	4	1	5	3.24	10
Ted Sadowski	19	1	1	0	5.03	15
Jim Roland	1	0	0	0	0.00	1
Gerry Arrigo	1	0	0	0	18.00	1

== Farm system ==
Level	Team	League	Manager
AAA	Vancouver Mounties	Pacific Coast League	Jack McKeon
A	Charlotte Hornets	Sally League	Spencer "Red" Robbins
B	Wilson Tobs	Carolina League	Harry Warner
C	Bismarck-Mandan Pards	Northern League	Vern Morgan
D	Fort Walton Beach Jets	Alabama–Florida League	Ralph Rowe
D	Wytheville Twins	Appalachian League	Red Norwood
D	Erie Sailors	New York–Penn League	Frank Franchi
