= 1962 Cleveland Indians season =

1962 Cleveland Indians
- League: American League
- Ballpark: Cleveland Municipal Stadium
- City: Cleveland, Ohio
- Record: 80–82 (.494)
- League place: 6th
- Owners: William R. Daley
- General managers: Gabe Paul
- Managers: Mel McGaha
- Television: WJW-TV (Ken Coleman, Bob Neal)
- Radio: WERE (Jimmy Dudley, Harry Jones)

The 1962 Cleveland Indians season was a season in American baseball. The team finished sixth in the American League with a record of 80–82, 16 games behind the World Champion New York Yankees. Once again, the Indians got off to another fast start (48–36 at the All Star break), however they would lose their next nine games, 19 of their next 24, and 28 of their next 38 games to fall into the lower half of the standings. After the slump, the Indians would rebound slightly to win 22 of their final 40 games, but it was way too little far too late, and manager Mel McGaha would be finished by the end of the season. The Indians were one of only two American League teams to win the season series (Baltimore being the other one) against the Yankees (who would win the pennant, and later the World Series in 7 games over the San Francisco Giants), taking 11 of the 18 contests. However, they would go 9–9 against the 60–102 Senators.

== Offseason ==
- October 5, 1961: Jimmy Piersall was traded by the Indians to the Washington Senators for Dick Donovan, Gene Green, and Jim Mahoney
- November 16, 1961: Johnny Temple was traded by the Indians to the Baltimore Orioles for Harry Chiti, Ray Barker and Art Kay (minors).
- March 1962: Duke Carmel was purchased by the Indians from the St. Louis Cardinals.
- Prior to 1962 season: Rubén Gómez was acquired by the Indians from the Philadelphia Phillies.

== Regular season ==
=== Season standings ===
American League
Team	W	L	Pct.	GB	Home	Road
New York Yankees	96	66	.593	—	50‍–‍30	46‍–‍36
Minnesota Twins	91	71	.562	5	45‍–‍36	46‍–‍35
Los Angeles Angels	86	76	.531	10	40‍–‍41	46‍–‍35
Detroit Tigers	85	76	.528	10½	49‍–‍33	36‍–‍43
Chicago White Sox	85	77	.525	11	43‍–‍38	42‍–‍39
Cleveland Indians	80	82	.494	16	43‍–‍38	37‍–‍44
Baltimore Orioles	77	85	.475	19	44‍–‍38	33‍–‍47
Boston Red Sox	76	84	.475	19	39‍–‍40	37‍–‍44
Kansas City Athletics	72	90	.444	24	39‍–‍42	33‍–‍48
Washington Senators	60	101	.373	35½	27‍–‍53	33‍–‍48

=== Record vs. opponents ===
1962 American League record Sources:
Team	BAL	BOS	CWS	CLE	DET	KCA	LAA	MIN	NYY	WAS
Baltimore	—	8–10	9–9	11–7	2–16	10–8	8–10	6–12	11–7	12–6
Boston	10–8	—	8–10	7–11	11–6	10–8	6–12	10–8	6–12	8–9
Chicago	9–9	10–8	—	12–6	9–9	9–9	10–8	8–10	8–10	10–8
Cleveland	7–11	11–7	6–12	—	10–8	11–7	9–9	6–12	11–7	9–9
Detroit	16–2	6–11	9–9	8–10	—	12–6	11–7	5–13	7–11	11–7
Kansas City	8–10	8–10	9–9	7–11	6–12	—	6–12	8–10	5–13	15–3
Los Angeles	10–8	12–6	8–10	9–9	7–11	12–6	—	9–9	8–10	11–7
Minnesota	12–6	8–10	10–8	12–6	13–5	10–8	9–9	—	7–11	10–8–1
New York	7–11	12–6	10–8	7–11	11–7	13–5	10–8	11–7	—	15–3
Washington	6–12	9–8	8–10	9–9	7–11	3–15	7–11	8–10–1	3–15	—

=== Notable transactions ===
- April 2, 1962: Vic Power and Dick Stigman were traded by the Indians to the Minnesota Twins for Pedro Ramos.
- April 26, 1962: Harry Chiti was purchased from the Indians by the New York Mets.
- April 29, 1962: Bob Nieman was purchased from the Indians by the San Francisco Giants.
- June 9, 1962: Lou Piniella was signed as an amateur free agent by the Indians.
- June 15, 1962: Harry Chiti was returned to the Indians by the New York Mets.
- August 20, 1962: Rubén Gómez was traded by the Indians to the Minnesota Twins for Jackie Collum, a player to be named later and cash. The Twins completed the deal by sending Georges Maranda to the Indians on October 9.

=== Opening Day Lineup ===
Opening Day Starters
#	Name	Position
9	Ty Cline	CF
14	Tito Francona	1B
30	Chuck Essegian	LF
8	Willie Kirkland	RF
11	Johnny Romano	C
3	Woodie Held	SS
5	Bubba Phillips	3B
1	Jerry Kindall	2B
20	Dick Donovan	P

=== Roster ===
1962 Cleveland Indians
Roster
Pitchers: 24 Bob Allen; 39 Gary Bell; 29 Jackie Collum; 27 Bill Dailey; 20 Dick Donovan; 38 Frank Funk; 29 Rubén Gómez; 33 Mudcat Grant; 26 Bob Hartman; 34,23 Wynn Hawkins; 18 Barry Latman; 17 Sam McDowell; 31 Jim Perry; 28 Pedro Ramos; 26 Don Rudolph; 22 Ron Taylor; 26 Dave Tyriver; 23 Floyd Weaver	Catchers: 25 Doc Edwards; 11 Johnny Romano; Infielders: 10 Max Alvis; 2 Ken Aspromonte; 7 Mike de la Hoz; 14 Tito Francona; 3 Woodie Held; 15 Hal Jones; 1 Jerry Kindall; 2 Jack Kubiszyn; 16,7 Jim Mahoney; 5 Bubba Phillips	Outfielders: 4 Tommie Agee; 35 Walt Bond; 9 Ty Cline; 36 Don Dillard; 30 Chuck Essegian; 12 Gene Green; 8 Willie Kirkland; 32 Al Luplow; 6 Willie Tasby; Other batters: 2 Marlan Coughtry; 4 Bob Nieman	Manager: 43 Mel Harder; 42 Mel McGaha; Coaches: 43 Mel Harder (Pitching); 45 Hank Izquierdo (Bullpen catcher); 40 Ray Katt (First base); 41 Salty Parker (Third base)

== Player stats ==
= Indicates team leader

=== Batting ===
==== Starters by position ====
Note: Pos = Position; G = Games played; AB = At bats; H = Hits; Avg. = Batting average; HR = Home runs; RBI = Runs batted in

Pos	Player	G	AB	H	Avg.	HR	RBI
C	Johnny Romano	135	459	120	.261	25	81
1B	Tito Francona	158	621	169	.272	14	70
2B	Jerry Kindall	154	530	123	.232	13	55
SS	Woodie Held	139	466	116	.249	19	58
3B	Bubba Phillips	148	562	145	.258	10	54
LF	Chuck Essegian	106	336	92	.274	21	50
CF	Ty Cline	118	375	93	.248	2	28
RF	Willie Kirkland	137	419	84	.200	21	72

==== Other batters ====
Note: G = Games played; AB = At bats; H = Hits; Avg. = Batting average; HR = Home runs; RBI = Runs batted in

Player	G	AB	H	Avg.	HR	RBI
Al Luplow	97	318	88	.277	14	45
Willie Tasby	75	199	48	.241	4	17
Don Dillard	95	174	40	.230	5	14
Doc Edwards	53	143	39	.273	3	9
Gene Green	66	143	40	.280	11	28
Jim Mahoney	41	74	18	.243	3	5
Jack Kubiszyn	25	59	10	.169	1	2
Max Alvis	12	51	11	.216	0	3
Walt Bond	12	50	19	.380	6	17
Ken Aspromonte	20	28	4	.143	0	1
Hal Jones	5	16	5	.313	0	1
Tommie Agee	5	14	3	.214	0	2
Mike de la Hoz	12	12	1	.083	0	0
Marlan Coughtry	3	2	1	.500	0	1
Bob Nieman	2	1	0	.000	0	1

=== Pitching ===
==== Starting pitchers ====
Note: G = Games pitched; IP = Innings pitched; W = Wins; L = Losses; ERA = Earned run average; SO = Strikeouts

Player	G	IP	W	L	ERA	SO
Dick Donovan	34	250.2	20	10	3.59	94
Pedro Ramos	37	201.1	10	12	3.71	96
Jim Perry	35	193.2	12	12	4.14	74
Mudcat Grant	26	149.2	7	10	4.27	90
Floyd Weaver	1	5.0	1	0	1.80	8

==== Other pitchers ====
Note: G = Games pitched; IP = Innings pitched; W = Wins; L = Losses; ERA = Earned run average; SO = Strikeouts

Player	G	IP	W	L	ERA	SO
Barry Latman	45	179.1	8	13	4.17	117
Sam McDowell	25	87.2	3	7	6.06	70
Rubén Gómez	15	45.1	1	2	4.37	21
Ron Taylor	8	33.1	2	2	5.94	15
Bob Hartman	8	17.1	0	1	3.12	11

==== Relief pitchers ====
Note: G = Games pitched; W = Wins; L = Losses; SV = Saves; ERA = Earned run average; SO = Strikeouts

Player	G	W	L	SV	ERA	SO
Gary Bell	57	10	9	12	4.26	80
Frank Funk	47	2	1	6	3.24	49
Bob Allen	30	1	1	4	5.87	23
Bill Dailey	27	2	2	1	3.59	24
Dave Tyriver	4	0	0	0	4.22	7
Wynn Hawkins	3	1	0	0	7.36	0
Jackie Collum	1	0	0	0	13.50	1
Don Rudolph	1	0	0	0	0.00	0

== Awards and honors ==
- Dick Donovan, Sporting News AL Pitcher of the Year.

All-Star Game

- Dick Donovan, Pitcher, Reserve (both games)
- Johnny Romano, Catcher, Reserve (both games)

== Farm system ==
Level	Team	League	Manager
AAA	Jacksonville Suns	International League	Ben Geraghty
AAA	Salt Lake City Bees	Pacific Coast League	Bob Kennedy
A	Charleston Indians	Eastern League	Johnny Lipon
B	Burlington Indians	Carolina League	Gene Verble
D	Selma Cloverleafs	Alabama–Florida League	Pinky May
D	Dubuque Packers	Midwest League	Walt Novick

LEAGUE CHAMPIONS: Selma, Dubuque
Salt Lake City affiliation shared with Chicago Cubs
