= 1962 Detroit Tigers season =

Major League Baseball season

1962 Detroit Tigers
- League: American League
- Ballpark: Tiger Stadium
- City: Detroit, Michigan
- Record: 85–76 (.528)
- League place: 4th
- Owners: John Fetzer
- General managers: Rick Ferrell
- Managers: Bob Scheffing
- Television: WJBK
- Radio: WKMH; WWJ; WJR (George Kell, Ernie Harwell)

The 1962 Detroit Tigers season was a season in American baseball. The team finished tied for third place in the American League with a record of 85–76, 10 1/2 games behind the New York Yankees.

== Offseason ==
- October 12, 1961: Gerry Staley was released by the Tigers.
- October 23, 1961: Frank House was released by the Tigers.
- Prior to 1962 season (exact date unknown)
  - Arlo Brunsberg was signed as an amateur free agent by the Tigers.
  - Conrad Cardinal was signed as an amateur free agent by the Tigers.

== Regular season ==
=== Season standings ===
American League
Team	W	L	Pct.	GB	Home	Road
New York Yankees	96	66	.593	—	50‍–‍30	46‍–‍36
Minnesota Twins	91	71	.562	5	45‍–‍36	46‍–‍35
Los Angeles Angels	86	76	.531	10	40‍–‍41	46‍–‍35
Detroit Tigers	85	76	.528	10½	49‍–‍33	36‍–‍43
Chicago White Sox	85	77	.525	11	43‍–‍38	42‍–‍39
Cleveland Indians	80	82	.494	16	43‍–‍38	37‍–‍44
Baltimore Orioles	77	85	.475	19	44‍–‍38	33‍–‍47
Boston Red Sox	76	84	.475	19	39‍–‍40	37‍–‍44
Kansas City Athletics	72	90	.444	24	39‍–‍42	33‍–‍48
Washington Senators	60	101	.373	35½	27‍–‍53	33‍–‍48

=== Record vs. opponents ===
1962 American League record Sources:
Team	BAL	BOS	CWS	CLE	DET	KCA	LAA	MIN	NYY	WAS
Baltimore	—	8–10	9–9	11–7	2–16	10–8	8–10	6–12	11–7	12–6
Boston	10–8	—	8–10	7–11	11–6	10–8	6–12	10–8	6–12	8–9
Chicago	9–9	10–8	—	12–6	9–9	9–9	10–8	8–10	8–10	10–8
Cleveland	7–11	11–7	6–12	—	10–8	11–7	9–9	6–12	11–7	9–9
Detroit	16–2	6–11	9–9	8–10	—	12–6	11–7	5–13	7–11	11–7
Kansas City	8–10	8–10	9–9	7–11	6–12	—	6–12	8–10	5–13	15–3
Los Angeles	10–8	12–6	8–10	9–9	7–11	12–6	—	9–9	8–10	11–7
Minnesota	12–6	8–10	10–8	12–6	13–5	10–8	9–9	—	7–11	10–8–1
New York	7–11	12–6	10–8	7–11	11–7	13–5	10–8	11–7	—	15–3
Washington	6–12	9–8	8–10	9–9	7–11	3–15	7–11	8–10–1	3–15	—

=== Notable transactions ===
- June 1962: Al Pehanick (minors) was traded by the Tigers to the Pittsburgh Pirates for Coot Veal.

=== Roster ===
1962 Detroit Tigers
Roster
Pitchers: 37 Hank Aguirre; 14 Jim Bunning; 19 Jerry Casale; 19 Bill Faul; 31 Tom Fletcher; 18 Terry Fox; 21 Paul Foytack; 32,51 Doug Gallagher; 29 Fred Gladding; 46 Bob Humphreys; 23 Sam Jones; 22 Ron Kline; 45 Howie Koplitz; 17 Frank Lary; 15 Don Mossi; 29 Ron Nischwitz; 16 Phil Regan	Catchers: 10 Dick Brown; 12 Mike Roarke; Infielders: 8 Reno Bertoia; 1 Steve Boros; 8 Don Buddin; 25 Norm Cash; 9 Chico Fernández; 46 Frank Kostro; 3 Dick McAuliffe; 28 Bobo Osborne; 20 Vic Wertz; 2 Jake Wood	Outfielders: 38 Bill Bruton; 7 Rocky Colavito; 26 Bob Farley; 5,54 Purnal Goldy; 6 Al Kaline; 4 Charlie Maxwell; 40 Bubba Morton; Other batters: 26 George Alusik	Manager: 27 Bob Scheffing; Coaches: 44 Phil Cavarretta; 33 Tom Ferrick; 34 George Myatt

== Player stats ==
=== Batting ===
==== Starters by position ====
Note: Pos = Position; G = Games played; AB = At bats; H = Hits; Avg. = Batting average; HR = Home runs; RBI = Runs batted in

Pos	Player	G	AB	H	Avg.	HR	RBI
C	Dick Brown	134	431	104	.241	12	40
1B	Norm Cash	148	507	123	.243	39	89
2B	Jake Wood	111	367	83	.226	8	30
SS	Chico Fernández	141	503	125	.249	20	59
3B	Steve Boros	116	356	81	.228	16	47
LF	Rocky Colavito	161	601	164	.273	37	112
CF	Bill Bruton	147	561	156	.278	16	74
RF	Al Kaline	100	398	121	.304	29	94

==== Other batters ====
Note: G = Games played; AB = At bats; H = Hits; Avg. = Batting average; HR = Home runs; RBI = Runs batted in

Player	G	AB	H	Avg.	HR	RBI
Dick McAuliffe	139	471	124	.263	12	63
Bubba Morton	90	195	51	.262	4	17
Mike Roarke	56	136	29	.213	4	14
Vic Wertz	74	105	34	.324	5	18
Don Buddin	31	83	19	.229	0	4
Bobo Osborne	64	74	17	.230	0	7
Purnal Goldy	20	70	16	.229	3	12
Charlie Maxwell	30	67	13	.194	1	9
Bob Farley	36	50	8	.160	1	4
Frank Kostro	16	41	11	.268	0	3
George Alusik	2	2	0	.000	0	0
Reno Bertoia	5	0	0	----	0	0

=== Pitching ===
==== Starting pitchers ====
Note: G = Games pitched; IP = Innings pitched; W = Wins; L = Losses; ERA = Earned run average; SO = Strikeouts

Player	G	IP	W	L	ERA	SO
Jim Bunning	41	258.0	19	10	3.59	184
Don Mossi	35	180.1	11	13	4.19	121
Phil Regan	35	171.1	11	9	4.04	87
Paul Foytack	29	143.2	10	7	4.39	63
Frank Lary	17	80.0	2	6	5.74	41

==== Other pitchers ====
Note: G = Games pitched; IP = Innings pitched; W = Wins; L = Losses; ERA = Earned run average; SO = Strikeouts

Player	G	IP	W	L	ERA	SO
Hank Aguirre	42	216.0	16	8	2.21	156
Sam Jones	30	81.1	2	4	3.65	73
Howie Koplitz	10	37.2	3	0	5.26	10
Doug Gallagher	9	25.0	0	4	4.68	14

==== Relief pitchers ====
Note: G = Games pitched; W = Wins; L = Losses; SV = Saves; ERA = Earned run average; SO = Strikeouts

Player	G	W	L	SV	ERA	SO
Terry Fox	44	3	1	16	1.71	23
Ron Nischwitz	48	4	5	4	3.90	28
Ron Kline	36	3	6	2	4.31	47
Jerry Casale	18	1	2	0	4.66	16
Fred Gladding	6	0	0	0	0.00	4
Bob Humphreys	4	0	1	1	7.20	3
Tom Fletcher	1	0	0	0	0.00	1
Bill Faul	1	0	0	0	32.40	2

== Farm system ==
Level	Team	League	Manager
AAA	Denver Bears	American Association	Frank Skaff
A	Knoxville Smokies	Sally League	Frank Carswell
C	Duluth–Superior Dukes	Northern League	Al Lakeman
D	Montgomery Rebels	Alabama–Florida League	Johnny Groth
D	Thomasville Tigers	Georgia–Florida League	Gail Henley
D	Jamestown Tigers	New York–Penn League	Stubby Overmire

LEAGUE CHAMPIONS: Thomasville

== See also ==
- 1962 in Michigan
