= Dave Tyriver =

American baseball player (1937–1988)

- Pitcher
- Born: October 31, 1937; Oshkosh, Wisconsin, U.S.
- Died: October 28, 1988 (aged 50); Oshkosh, Wisconsin, U.S.
- Batted: Right Threw: Right

MLB debut
- August 21, 1962, for the Cleveland Indians

Last MLB appearance
- September 30, 1962, for the Cleveland Indians

MLB statistics
- Win–loss record: 0–0
- Earned run average: 4.22
- Strikeouts: 7
- Innings pitched: 102/3
- Stats at Baseball Reference

Teams
- Cleveland Indians (1962)

David Burton Tyriver (October 31, 1937 – October 28, 1988) was an American professional baseball player, a right-handed pitcher who appeared in four Major League games for the Cleveland Indians during the 1962 season. A native of Oshkosh, Wisconsin, he was listed as 6 feet (1.8 m) tall and 175 pounds (79 kg).

Tyriver's professional career lasted nine seasons (1956–64), all in the Cleveland organization. In his only MLB trial in 1962, he was recalled from the Triple-A Salt Lake City Bees in August. His four games all came in relief. In 102/3 innings pitched, he surrendered five earned runs, ten hits (including home runs by Steve Boros and Barry Shetrone) and seven bases on balls, with seven strikeouts.

In minor league baseball, Tyriver won 78 games, and posted four seasons of ten or more victories. He died of a heart attack at age 50.
