= Nate Smith (catcher) =

American baseball player (1935–2019)

- Catcher
- Born: April 26, 1935; Chicago, Illinois, U.S.
- Died: August 18, 2019 (aged 84); Atlanta, Georgia, U.S.
- Batted: Right Threw: Right

MLB debut
- September 19, 1962, for the Baltimore Orioles

Last MLB appearance
- September 29, 1962, for the Baltimore Orioles

MLB statistics
- Batting average: .222
- Home runs: 0
- Runs batted in: 0
- Stats at Baseball Reference

Teams
- Baltimore Orioles (1962)

Nathaniel Beverly Smith (April 26, 1935 – August 18, 2019) was an American professional baseball player, a catcher whose career was confined to minor league baseball except for a five-game Major League stint with the Baltimore Orioles at the end of the 1962 season. He threw and batted right-handed, stood 5 feet 11 inches (1.80 m) tall and weighed 170 pounds (77 kg).

Born in Chicago, Smith attended Tennessee State University. His professional career (1956–59; 1961–64) was spent in the Brooklyn/Los Angeles Dodgers' organization until the Orioles purchased his contract from the Triple-A Omaha Dodgers on 10 September 1962. In his first MLB at bat, Smith pinch hit for Oriole pitcher Wes Stock and singled off left-hander Ted Bowsfield of the Los Angeles Angels. He would collect one more hit, a double off another lefty, Jack Kralick of the Minnesota Twins, in his last MLB game.
