= John Papa =

American baseball player (born 1940)

- Pitcher
- Born: December 5, 1940 (age 85); Bridgeport, Connecticut, U.S.
- Batted: Right Threw: Right

MLB debut
- April 11, 1961, for the Baltimore Orioles

Last MLB appearance
- September 16, 1962, for the Baltimore Orioles

MLB statistics
- Win–loss record: 0–0
- Earned run average: 22.50
- Innings: 2
- Stats at Baseball Reference

Teams
- Baltimore Orioles (1961–1962)

John Paul Papa (born December 5, 1940) is an American former professional baseball player. Papa, a right-handed pitcher, appeared in three Major League games, all in relief, for the Baltimore Orioles in 1961–1962, and spent the remainder of his career in minor league baseball. He attended the University of Bridgeport and the University of New Haven, stood 5 feet 11 inches (1.80 m) tall and weighed 190 pounds (86 kg).

Papa signed with the Orioles in 1958 for a $65,000 bonus. That season, Major League Baseball rescinded the infamous "bonus rule" that would have mandated that the Orioles keep Papa on their 25-man roster for two full seasons; the rule was blamed for wrecking the careers of numerous "bonus babies" whose talents rusted on the bench, rather than being developed in the minors. Sent to the Baltimore farm system, Papa hurt his arm in his third pro season, trying to throw the slider in Class B. But he made the Baltimore opening-season 28-man roster in 1961 at the age of 20.

In his big-league debut, on April 11, 1961 — Opening Day for the Orioles, and the first American League game in the history of the Los Angeles Angels franchise — Papa was called into the game in the top of the second inning to relieve an ineffective Milt Pappas. He surrendered a three-run home run to the first batter he faced, Ted Kluszewski — Kluszewski's second homer in two innings. But he struck out the next batter, Bob Cerv, to end the inning. Five days later, he again was called upon to take over for an ineffective starting pitcher: in this case, Chuck Estrada, who failed to record an out in the first inning against the Minnesota Twins. Papa struck out two hitters, Earl Battey and Billy Gardner, but gave up three bases on balls, a single and one earned run before he was relieved by Dick Hall. He then was sent back to the minors, but compiled a frustrating 0–11 season split between Double-A and Triple-A Oriole affiliates. In 1962, Papa appeared in one game, in the Major Leagues, on September 16. In one inning, he gave up three hits, three earned runs and one walk against the Kansas City Athletics. In his three MLB appearances, he gave up five hits and five earned runs in two full innings pitched, walking four and striking out three.

His minor career continued through 1965. After getting a degree in business administration, Papa became a businessman and elected municipal official in Shelton, Connecticut.
