= Dan Osinski =

American baseball player (1933–2013)

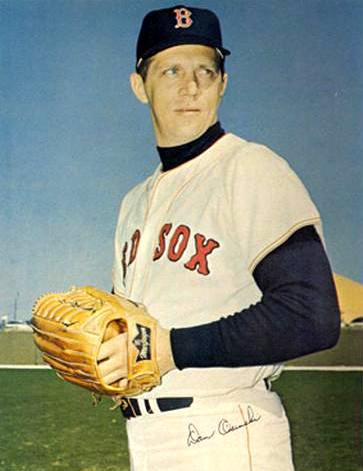
- Pitcher
- Born: November 17, 1933; Chicago, Illinois, U.S.
- Died: September 13, 2013 (aged 79); Sun City, Arizona, U.S.
- Batted: Right Threw: Right

MLB debut
- April 11, 1962, for the Kansas City Athletics

Last MLB appearance
- April 16, 1970, for the Houston Astros

MLB statistics
- Win–loss record: 29–28
- Earned run average: 3.34
- Strikeouts: 400
- Stats at Baseball Reference

Teams
- Kansas City Athletics (1962); Los Angeles Angels (1962–1964); Milwaukee Braves (1965); Boston Red Sox (1966–1967); Chicago White Sox (1969); Houston Astros (1970)

Daniel Osinski (/oʊˈsɪnskiː/ oh-SIN-skee; November 17, 1933 – September 13, 2013), nicknamed "the Silencer", was an American Major League Baseball relief pitcher. The 6 ft 2 in (1.88 m), 195 pounds (88 kg) right-hander was signed by the Cleveland Indians as an amateur free agent before the 1952 season. He played for the Kansas City Athletics (1962), Los Angeles Angels (1962–1964), Milwaukee Braves (1965), Boston Red Sox (1966–1967), Chicago White Sox (1969), and Houston Astros (1970).

Born in Chicago, Osinski played baseball, football, and basketball in high school. He almost attended the United States Naval Academy on a football scholarship, but after flunking his physical, he chose instead to sign a contract with the Indians. He played minor league baseball with them for a few years but was plagued by mononucleosis, which he was diagnosed with in 1955. In 1957, Osinski was drafted by the United States Army, serving at Fort Campbell for two years. Unsure whether he should continue playing baseball or not, Osinski tried out with the White Sox in 1959 and was added to one of their minor league clubs. He focused on serving as a relief pitcher and made his major league debut with the Athletics in 1962. Though he did not last long with the Athletics, Osinski impressed the Angels' general manager while pitching for the minor league Portland Beavers. The Angels acquired him in a trade, and he helped give the team one of the best bullpens in the major leagues in 1962. In 1963, he made 16 starts for the club, though he also appeared in 31 games in relief. He posted a 3.48 earned run average (ERA) used mainly in relief in 1964, then was traded to Milwaukee.

Osinski posted a 2.82 ERA with the Braves in 1965 and also was asked by broadcaster Howard Cosell to demonstrate the spitball on national television. He was traded to the Red Sox in December, with whom he spent the next two seasons. Osinski had the lowest ERA of his career (2.54) in 1967 and pitched in two games in the 1967 World Series, which Boston lost to the St. Louis Cardinals in seven games. However, he was released during 1968 spring training and spent the season in the minor leagues. He earned a spot on the White Sox' roster in 1969 and posted a 3.56 ERA in 51 games. In 1970, he began the year with Houston but was assigned to the minor leagues after three games; he retired after the year. Following his baseball career, Osinski owned a restaurant as well a steel fabrication shop in Oak Forest, Illinois. Later, he sold cars in Sun City, Arizona. He died on September 13, 2013.

== Early life ==
Osinski was born in Chicago on November 17, 1933, the first child of Anthony and Veronica Osinski. He had one younger sibling, brother Ed. After his first two years of high school, his family moved from Wauconda, Illinois, to Barrington, Illinois. Osinski played baseball, football, and basketball in high school. During his senior year, he threw back-to-back no-hitters and drew the interest of baseball scouts, though Osinski claimed that football and basketball were his main sports. Once he graduated high school, Osinski had planned to attend the United States Naval Academy, but he flunked his physical. The Navy planned to admit him anyway on a football scholarship, causing media outlets to wonder if they were favoring athletes over the general population. Not wanting to be caught up in the controversy, Osinski chose to pursue a baseball career. He worked out with the St. Louis Browns, but Wally Laskowski, a scout for the Cleveland Indians, spotted him and signed him to a $4,000 contract, the most he could get without being considered a bonus baby (which would have forced the Indians to keep the 17-year-old Osinski in the major leagues all of his first professional season without getting a chance to develop his skills at the minor league level).

== Career ==
=== 1952–58: Early minor league career, military service ===
In 1952, Osinski played his first professional season with the Fort Smith Indians of the Class C Western Association. Years later, he recalled facing John Blanchard of the Joplin Miners. "I can remember throwing him a fastball and he hit that thing up the light tower in right-center field. I never had a ball hit that hard off me ever." In 37 games (12 starts), he had 11 wins, a 3.58 earned run average (ERA), and 155 strikeouts in 221 innings pitched. However, he led the Western Association in losses (16) and walks (171).

Osinski remained at the Class C level in 1953 but this time pitched for the Sherbrooke Indians of the Provincial League. "I remember going swimming [at Lake Magog] one time, and I never got sunburned so bad. And then I had to come back and pitch the next day," Osinski recalled about one of his starts with Sherbrooke. "I had sunburn all over and I just covered myself up with this Noxzema, and I had a wool sweatshirt on, and I went out there. I was loose, don't get me wrong, I got very loose. I walked 17 batters and I still had a shutout going in the eighth inning...I won the ballgame 5-1." In 30 games (26 starts), he had an 18–7 record, a 2.80 ERA, and 135 strikeouts (a Sherbrooke record) in 196 innings. His 18 wins tied for Marco Mainini for third in the league (behind Bill Diemer's and Michael Munsinger's 20), but his 138 walks were third in the league (behind Bennett Malcolm's 153 and Mainini's 145).

In 1954, Osinski was promoted to the Keokuk Kernels of the Class B Illinois-Indiana-Iowa League, where he was teammates with Roger Maris, the future New York Yankees star who would be his roommate with three different teams from 1954 to 1955. His season got off to a strong start, meriting him the start for the league's All-Star Game at midseason. However, he pitched poorly in the second half, battling fatigue and ineffectiveness. He appeared in 27 games (25 starts) for Keokuk, ranking among the league leaders in wins (13, tied with James O'Reilly and Frederick Vogel for seventh), losses (10, tied with four others for 10th), strikeouts (141, sixth), walks (118, third to O'Reilly's 127 and George Aitken's 124), and innings pitched (193, tied with O'Reilly for ninth) while posting a 3.87 ERA.

Osinski was assigned to the Tulsa Oilers of the Class AA Texas League to begin the 1955 season, but he only pitched in five games for them. One day, he had to miss a start because of a bad fever; the team physician examined him, and Osinski was diagnosed with mononucleosis, which had led to his fatigue the season before. He was reassigned to the Reading Indians of the Class A Eastern League but collapsed upon arriving at his hotel room in Reading and only pitched in two games, spending much of his time in a hospital as he recovered from the disease. In July, he joined the Spartanburg Peaches of the Class B Tri-State League. He appeared in 12 games (nine starts) for Spartanburg, posting a 5–3 record and a 4.01 ERA while walking 62 batters in 74 innings. In 1956, still feeling the effects of the mononucleosis, he remained at the Class B level, this time with the Fayetteville Highlanders of the Carolina League. In 39 games (20 starts), he had a 10–11 record and a 3.75 ERA in 199 innings pitched. His 131 walks ranked second in the league to Earl Hunsinger's 142.

By 1957, Osinski was unsure whether it was worth continuing his baseball career. "At that time I was just thinking about hanging it up. I just wasn't moving at all going from Double A to A, to B again, and then to B again which was not considered as strong a league as the Three-I League. You think, oh, you're done." Drafted by the United States Army, he spent 1957 and 1958 serving in the military. This did not prevent him from playing baseball, though, as he was assigned to the baseball team at Fort Campbell.

=== 1959–61: Becoming a relief pitcher ===
In 1959, Osinski met with the Chicago White Sox, who invited him to spring training, then assigned him to the Duluth-Superior Dukes of the Class C Northern League. "I decided, well, the best way for me to [reach the major leagues was] to become a relief pitcher and forget about the starting," Osinski said. The league was lower than those he'd pitched in the last two seasons, but Osinski looked at it as an opportunity to see if he could still pitch. Only making four starts, he led the league with 50 games pitched, posting an 8–9 record, a 2.41 ERA, and 58 walks in 138 innings. Though primarily used in relief, he tied with Dooley Womack for 10th in the league in strikeouts.

Osinski began the 1960 season with the Charleston White Sox of the Class A South Atlantic League. He had a 2.31 ERA in 14 games for them but spent most of the year with the Lincoln Chiefs of the Illinois-Indiana-Iowa League. In 47 games, he had a 9–2 record, a 2.89 ERA, 115 strikeouts, and 60 walks in 81 innings. He returned to Charleston in 1961 and led the league with 56 games pitched, posting an 8–6 record, a 2.50 ERA, 114 strikeouts, and 55 walks in 108 innings while drawing the attention of major league clubs as a bullpen asset.

=== 1962–64: Debut, success in the bullpen, a chance to start ===
In 1962, the Kansas City Athletics signed Osinski to a contract and invited him to spring training; he pitched so well, he began the season in their bullpen. Osinski made his major league debut in relief on April 11, 1962 against the Minnesota Twins at Kansas City Municipal Stadium. He pitched the top of the ninth inning and gave up three earned runs in an 8–0 Athletics loss, claiming second baseman Bernie Allen as his first strikeout. He pitched in three more games that month, struggled with his control, and was sent down to the minor leagues. First, he pitched for the Albuquerque Dukes of the Texas League, but on May 29, he was transferred to the Portland Beavers of the Class AAA Pacific Coast League (PCL). Used often, he posted a 1.06 ERA in a 20-day span where he made 16 appearances; this earned him a selection to the PCL All-Star Team. The PCL All-Stars played an exhibition game against the Los Angeles Angels on July 11, and Fred Haney (the Angels' general manager) was impressed with the right-hander. On July 21, the Angels traded for him, sending cash and a player to be named later (Ted Bowsfield) to the Athletics. Osinski was added to the Angels' roster.

Osinski pitched very well for the rest of the season, forming what Sports Illustrated called "one of the strongest bullpens in the majors," along with Art Fowler, Tom Morgan, and Jack Spring. He joined the Angels three days after the trade and earned his first big league save that day with two scoreless innings in Game 2 of a doubleheader against the Baltimore Orioles at Chavez Ravine Stadium. Then, nine days later, he got his first major league win with a scoreless inning against the Cleveland Indians. After Bo Belinsky allowed three runs in the second inning of a game against the Boston Red Sox on August 15, Osinski entered, stranded a runner on second base, and threw 6 1/3 innings of relief, allowing just one run and picking up the victory as the Angels won 5–4. From August 21 through 23, he pitched in all three games of a series against the New York Yankees, losing the game on the 22nd after giving up two runs in 2 3/3 innings but winning the game on the 23rd when he threw five scoreless innings of relief as the Angels scored the winning run in the 13th inning. In 33 games for the Angels in his rookie year, Osinski was 6–4 with four saves and an ERA of 2.82. Including his Kansas City statistics, his final ERA was 3.97. He credited Angel pitching coach Marv Grissom for his improvement.

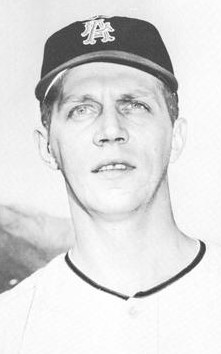
Osinski, circa 1964

A broken finger suffered in Osinski's first game of 1963 (April 13) kept the pitcher inactive until May 2. After just five games back, Osinski was inserted into the Angels' starting rotation. In his first major league start, against the Red Sox on May 16, he threw a complete game but took the loss, surrendering three runs in eight innings at Fenway Park. On June 4, he threw a three-hit shutout, beating the Chicago White Sox 1–0 at Chavez Ravine Stadium. Failing to make it through the first inning after allowing four runs to the Twins on June 8, he made another start on June 10 against his former team, throwing a complete game as the Angels beat the Athletics 13–3. Nine days later, in the first game of a doubleheader, he threw another complete game against the Athletics, limiting them to two runs in a 4–2 victory. He had a 6–5 record and 3.06 ERA through July 11 but was moved back to the bullpen after starting his 13th game that day. For most of the rest of the year, he served as a relief pitcher, though he would make three more starts. In a 3–0 loss to Minnesota on August 8, he threw 5 2/3 shutout innings in relief of Paul Foytack. In 47 games (16 starts), he had an 8–8 record, four saves, a 3.28 ERA, 100 strikeouts, and 80 walks in 159 1/3 innings.

Osinski began 1964 in the bullpen again; this year, all but four of his appearances would be in relief. His ERA was at 6.00 on May 25, but he had a 2.61 ERA over the rest of the season. On May 29, he threw five shutout innings of relief and struck out 10 batters in a 3–2 loss to the Orioles. In the first game of a doubleheader against the Detroit Tigers on June 14, he gave up two runs (one earned) in five innings of relief, but the Angels lost 6–5. He threw three shutout innings and picked up a save against Kansas City on June 25 in a 4–3 victory. On August 20, he entered a game against Detroit in the sixth inning and threw four shutout innings, allowing only one hit and picking up the win in a 4–3 victory. He was used to start the last game of the season on October 4 and threw a six-inning shutout in a rain-shortened, 3–0 victory over the Twins. In 47 games, he had a 3–3 record, two saves, a 3.48 ERA, 88 strikeouts, and 39 walks in 93 innings. On October 14, the Angels traded a player to be named later to the Milwaukee Braves for Ron Piche and Phil Roof. The Angels named Osinski as the other player on November 29.

=== 1965–67: Demonstrating the spitball; pitching in the World Series ===
In 1965, Osinski was used exclusively in relief. This season, he never pitched more than 3 1/3 innings in a game. The 3 1/3 inning appearance came on July 15; he relieved Ken Johnson with two outs in the sixth inning and threw scoreless baseball the rest of the game, earning the save in a 9–6 victory over the Pittsburgh Pirates. His most memorable moment with the Braves came on July 30. "We're playing the [San Francisco] Giants...and [Bob] Shaw was pitching for the Giants and throwing nothing but spitters. (Note: The spitball is an illegal pitch according to MLB rules.) I remember [manager Bobby Bragan] calling the bullpen and asking if anybody down there threw a spitter, and I got elected." Bragan ordered him to throw the pitch and be very obvious about it; he threw two shutout innings as the Braves lost 9–2. The next day, broadcaster Howard Cosell had him demonstrate the spitball to national television on the game's pre-game show. Osinski claimed that after the game, he never had a strike called for him all season. Actually, he would strike out 17 more batters in 1965, but his strikeout-to-walk ratio flipped, as his walk total surpassed his strikeout total in the season's final months. In 61 games, he had an 0–3 record but posted a 2.82 ERA, with 54 strikeouts and 40 walks in 83 innings. He also had six saves, which would be a career high. The Braves moved to Atlanta following the 1965 season, but Osinski never played for them in Georgia. Instead, on December 16, 1965, he was traded with Bob Sadowski to the Boston Red Sox for Arnold Earley, Lee Thomas, and a player to be named later (Jay Ritchie on January 11, 1966). Interestingly, his 1966 Topps baseball card listed his team as the Braves on the front but mentioned the trade to the Red Sox on the back.

Dick Radatz was the main relief pitcher for the Red Sox, but Osinski was expected by manager Billy Herman to provide a strong second option in 1966. Hall of Famer Ted Williams said, "I'd hate to hit against [Osinski]. What a motion he's got. He's got to help this club." He suffered blown saves in his first two games of the year and had a 12.27 ERA over his first five games. He had gotten his ERA down to 5.00 on May 28, but it rose to 9.00 after he gave up five runs in one inning of a 12–2 loss to the Washington Senators on June 2. He had a 2.67 ERA for the rest of the season but was used mostly in losses. In the first game of a doubleheader against Washington on July 4, he threw 6 2/3 innings in a 6–4 loss. After September 6, he was not used again by the Red Sox until the 27th, when he was used to start the second game of a doubleheader against the White Sox, Boston's last game of the year. Osinski limited Chicago to one run over 5 2/3 innings and picked up the win as Boston prevailed 2–1. In 44 games (one start), he had a 4–3 record, two saves, a 3.61 ERA, 44 strikeouts, and 28 walks in 67 1/3 innings.

Entering the 1967 season, Osinski was projected to serve as a middle reliever for Boston. In his first appearance of the year on April 16, he threw six shutout innings in an 18-inning, 7–6 loss to the Yankees. On May 7, he limited the Twins to one run in five innings of relief, picking up the victory as the Red Sox won 9–6. He threw eight innings over a two-day span on July 28 and July 29 in two losses to the Twins. In 34 games, he had a 3–1 record, two saves, a career-low 2.54 ERA, 38 strikeouts, and 14 walks in 63 2/3 innings. He was part of the Red Sox "Impossible Dream" team that won their first American League pennant since 1946. The Boston Herald Traveler said of him, "Osinski is not a sentimentalist. Rather, he's a pro's pro. Though he has only five years in the major leagues, he has the qualities --maturity, judgment and a dogged competitiveness -- that often are never found in men with twice his longevity."

In the 1967 World Series against the St. Louis Cardinals, Osinski appeared in two games. He gave up two hits and a run in an inning in Game 3, which Boston lost 5–2. Osinski also got the final out against St. Louis in Game 7, but Boston lost 7–2 as the Cardinals clinched the World Series championship.

=== 1968–70: Final seasons ===
Despite his low ERA in 1967, Osinski was released by Boston during spring training in 1968; he said later he found out the news not from the team but from a sportswriter. On April 29, the Chicago native was signed by the White Sox and assigned to the Hawaii Islanders of the PCL. He was used heavily by Hawaii, throwing a streak of over 25 scoreless innings in May. For the second time in his career, he was named to the PCL All-Star team at midseason. In 51 games (all in relief), he had an 8–2 record, a 2.39 ERA, 68 strikeouts, and six walks in 98 innings.

The White Sox invited Osinski to spring training in 1969 and added him to their bullpen, where he remained all season. This year, he never threw more than three innings in a game. He allowed a run in two innings on May 11 but picked up the save in a 7–5 victory over Cleveland. On May 16, after Wilbur Wood gave up three runs and allowed the Senators to tie the game in the seventh inning, Osinski entered the game with one out, shut out the Senators for the rest of the game, and got the win as the White Sox prevailed 7–6. On May 22, he gave up a run in 2 1/3 innings but picked up another save in a 7–3 victory over Detroit. In 51 games (his total with Hawaii the previous year), he compiled a 5–5 record with two saves, a 3.56 ERA, 27 strikeouts, and 23 walks in 60 2/3 innings.

Osinski's contract was sold to the Houston Astros on December 2. Not a part of their roster entering spring training, he nonetheless began the 1970 season in their bullpen. He only appeared in three games with the Astros, though, posting a 9.82 ERA. On April 16, he entered a game against the Giants in the 10th inning. He gave up a leadoff triple to Bobby Bonds but struck out Al Gallagher and got Willie Mays to hit into a groundout. Left-hander Jack DiLauro then replaced him to face the left-handed hitting Willie McCovey, but McCovey hit a home run to give the Giants a 7–5 victory. Since Osinski's runner provided the margin of victory, he was charged with the loss. It was his final major league appearance, as the Astros optioned him to the Oklahoma City 89ers of the Class AAA American Association on April 22, where he spent the rest of the season. In 45 games, he had a 6–8 record, a 2.42 ERA, 50 strikeouts, and 12 walks in 67 innings. He was claimed on waivers by the San Diego Padres after the season but chose to retire instead.

His major league career totals include a 29–28 record in 324 games (21 starts), five complete games, two shutouts, 122 games finished, 18 saves, and an ERA of 3.34. He had 400 strikeouts in 589 2/3 innings pitched for a 6.11 strikeouts per nine innings pitched ratio. Defensively, he made no errors in his last five major league seasons (193 games).

== Personal life ==
In July, 1960, Osinski married Peggy Frew, a Barrington resident. The couple had one son, Daniel D. A Portland sportswriter called him The Silencer during his time with the Beavers, and the nickname stuck for the rest of his career. Osinski worked as a banker during offseasons while he was still playing baseball. Following his career, he opened a restaurant called "Squire's Inn" in Oak Forest, Illinois. He also operated a steel fabrication shop in Oak Forest, called "DanO." In 1990, Osinski and his family moved to Sun City, Arizona, where he worked as a used car salesman. While he was with the Braves, Sports Illustrated reported a humorous encounter he had with a waitress at a restaurant. Asked if he wanted his pizza sliced into eight pieces, Osinski responded, "Better make it six. I can't eat eight." He died in Sun City on September 13, 2013.
