= Eli Grba =

American baseball player (1934–2019)

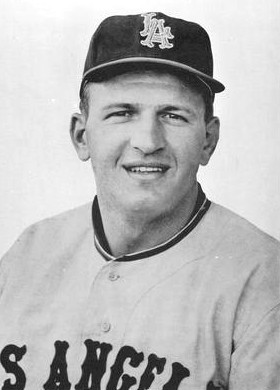
- Pitcher
- Born: August 9, 1934; Chicago, Illinois, U.S.
- Died: January 14, 2019 (aged 84); Florence, Alabama, U.S.
- Batted: Right Threw: Right

MLB debut
- July 10, 1959, for the New York Yankees

Last MLB appearance
- August 4, 1963, for the Los Angeles Angels

MLB statistics
- Win–loss record: 28–33
- Earned run average: 4.48
- Strikeouts: 255
- Stats at Baseball Reference

Teams
- New York Yankees (1959–1960); Los Angeles Angels (1961–1963)

Eli Grba (August 9, 1934 – January 14, 2019) was an American professional baseball pitcher in Major League Baseball (MLB). He pitched for the New York Yankees in 1959 and 1960 and for the Los Angeles Angels from 1961 through 1963.

Grba began his professional baseball career in the Boston Red Sox' organization, and was traded to the Yankees in 1957. After two years in the United States Army, Grba made his major league debut on July 10, 1959. He was the first selection of the 1960 MLB expansion draft by the Los Angeles Angels, and started their first game in 1961. He last pitched in MLB in 1963, and worked in Minor League Baseball as a coach, scout, and manager from 1969 through 1971 and from 1982 through 1997.

== Early life ==
Grba was born to Joseph and Eva Grba, Serbian immigrants who lived in Chicago, Illinois. He grew up on Chicago's South Side. His father left the family when Eli was young and he was raised alone by his mother, who worked as a waitress during the day and in a factory at night. Grba attended Bowen High School, where he starred in three sports.

== Career ==
After he graduated from Bowen in 1952, Grba signed a professional baseball contract with the Boston Red Sox of Major League Baseball (MLB). He made his professional debut in 1953 for the Salisbury Rocots of the Class D Tar Heel League, and was named an All-Star. He spent the 1954 season with the Corning Red Sox of the Class D Pennsylvania – Ontario – New York League (PONY League), and was again named an All-Star. He led all pitchers in the PONY League in strikeouts, games started, and innings pitched. The Red Sox promoted Grba to the San Jose Red Sox of the Class C California League for the 1955 season, and then to the San Francisco Seals of the Pacific Coast League in 1956. Manager Eddie Joost began to use Grba as a relief pitcher in deference to more veteran pitchers on the San Francisco pitching staff.

During spring training in 1957, the Red Sox traded Grba and Gordie Windhorn to the New York Yankees for Bill Renna. He was drafted into the United States Army before the end of spring training, and spent the next two years stationed in Fort Jackson and Fort McPherson, playing baseball and basketball on base teams.

Grba began the 1959 season with the Richmond Virginians of the Class AAA International League, and made his major league debut for the Yankees on July 10, 1959. He finished the season with the Yankees and had a 2–5 win–loss record and a 6.44 earned run average (ERA). Grba began the 1960 season with Richmond. He started the season pitching to a 7–1 win–loss record and was again promoted to the Yankees in July. He had a 6–4 win–loss record, a 3.68 ERA, and one save for the Yankees in 1960. The Yankees included Grba on their roster for the 1960 World Series. He appeared in one game as a pinch runner.

The Yankees did not protect Grba in the 1960 MLB expansion draft, held after the 1960 season. On the advice of former Yankees' manager Casey Stengel, the Los Angeles Angels chose Grba with the first selection. Grba started the first game in club history on April 11, 1961, pitching nine innings in a 7–2 victory over the Baltimore Orioles at Memorial Stadium in Baltimore. He had an 11–13 win–loss record in 1961, and an 8–9 win–loss record and a 4.54 ERA in 1962.

In 1963, Grba had a 0–1 record in 12 games for the Angels, who tried to trade him to other MLB teams, unsuccessfully. The Angels sold Grba to the Hawaii Islanders of the Pacific Coast League during the 1963 season. He played for the Toronto Maple Leafs of the International League in 1964, and was named an All-Star. He returned to Hawaii in 1965 and pitched for the Charros de Jalisco of the Mexican League in 1966. Grba attempted to make a return to the major leagues in 1967 with the Chicago White Sox. He pitched for the Indianapolis Indians of the Pacific Coast League, and retired after the 1967 season. He had a 28–33 win–loss record and a 4.48 ERA in MLB.

Grba worked odd jobs before working for the Oakland Athletics as a scout from 1969 through 1971. He managed the Lodi Crushers of the Class A California League in 1969. Grba returned to baseball in 1982 as a pitching coach in minor league baseball for the Vancouver Canadians in the Milwaukee Brewers' organization. He also served as a manager of the Reno Silver Sox of the California League in 1989, and the Princeton Patriots of the Appalachian League in 1990. Grba then joined the Philadelphia Phillies organization as a manager and pitching coach in the minor leagues and became a scout for five years, until retiring in 1997.

== Personal life ==
Grba was married four times. Grba and his first wife, Bonnie, had two children. He met his third wife while he worked in Vancouver. Grba and his fourth wife, Regina, married in 1993, and they lived in Florence, Alabama. Grba died on January 14, 2019, at age 84, from pancreatic cancer.

Grba drank heavily during his career, and developed alcoholism. He was arrested five times for driving under the influence of alcohol and suffered six seizures relating to his alcohol use. In 2016, Grba published a memoir, Eli Grba, Baseball’s Fallen Angel, cowritten by Doug Williams, which discussed his alcohol use and recovery.
