= Rupe Toppin =

Panamanian baseball player (born 1941)

- Pitcher
- Born: December 7, 1941 (age 84); Panama City, Panama
- Batted: Right Threw: Right

MLB debut
- July 28, 1962, for the Kansas City Athletics

Last MLB appearance
- August 1, 1962, for the Kansas City Athletics

MLB statistics
- Win–loss record: 0–0
- ERA: 13.50
- Strikeouts: 1
- Stats at Baseball Reference

Teams
- Kansas City Athletics (1962)

Ruperto Toppin (born December 7, 1941) is a Panamanian former professional baseball player. He was a right-handed pitcher who appeared in two Major League games for the 1962 Kansas City Athletics, although his professional career lasted a full decade (1960–1969). He was listed as 6 feet (1.8 m) tall and 185 pounds (84 kg).

Toppin's two MLB appearances, both in relief, came within four days of each other in the middle of the 1962 season. He pitched a scoreless inning against the Baltimore Orioles on July 28, allowing only one hit, a single to Dave Nicholson, who was then erased on a double play. Then, on August 1, Toppin allowed no hits in one total inning pitched against the Detroit Tigers—but surrendered five bases on balls and three earned runs. In that game, he came to bat for the only time in his big-league career, and singled off Howie Koplitz for a perfect career 1.000 batting average.

In two big-league innings pitched, Toppin struck out one, walked five, and allowed only the hit to Nicholson. His earned run average 13.50.
