= Doug Gallagher =

American baseball player (1940–2017)

- Pitcher
- Born: February 21, 1940; Fremont, Ohio, U.S.
- Died: December 17, 2017 (aged 77); Fremont, Ohio, U.S.
- Batted: Right Threw: Left

MLB debut
- April 9, 1962, for the Detroit Tigers

Last MLB appearance
- September 26, 1962, for the Detroit Tigers

MLB statistics
- Win–loss record: 0–4
- Earned run average: 4.68
- Strikeouts: 14
- Stats at Baseball Reference

Teams
- Detroit Tigers (1962)

Douglas Eugene Gallagher (February 21, 1940 – December 17, 2017) was an American professional baseball player and left-handed pitcher who appeared in nine games for the Detroit Tigers in 1962. Born in Fremont, Ohio, he batted right-handed and was listed as 6 feet 3 inches (1.91 m) tall and 195 pounds (88 kg).

Gallagher attended Fremont Ross High School before signing with the Tigers' organization in 1958. He made his professional debut with the Class-D Erie Sailors of the New York-Pennsylvania League. He threw a no-hitter for the Double-A Birmingham Barons in the 1961 Southern Association playoffs. Overall he was 15–9 for the Barons that season, which led to his getting called up to the Tigers the following season.

Gallagher made his Major League Baseball debut as a relief pitcher on April 9, 1962, opening day, against the Washington Senators, a game attended by President John F. Kennedy. He pitched 11/3 innings of relief in the game, allowing two hits and striking out Bennie Daniels. He would pitch in nine total games for the Tigers that season, including making two starts, and finished with an 0–4 record and 4.68 ERA in 25 full innings pitched. He allowed 31 hits and 15 bases on balls, and was credited with 14 strikeouts.

One highlight of Gallagher's MLB career came on April 27, 1962, when he pitched the final three innings against the Los Angeles Angels to preserve a 13–4 Tigers' victory for future Baseball Hall of Famer Jim Bunning and pick up his lone big-league save.

The following year, Gallagher was invited to spring training, where the Tigers wanted him to work on his curveball in an effort to get him back on the MLB roster. However, he ended up not making the varsity, and 1962 became his only year in the majors.

After his playing career, he served in the United States Air Force during the Vietnam War. In later life, he coached American Legion Baseball.
