= Jim Manning (pitcher) =

American baseball player (1943–2020)

- Pitcher
- Born: July 21, 1943; L'Anse, Michigan, U.S.
- Died: January 1, 2020 (aged 76); Asheville, North Carolina, U.S.
- Batted: Right Threw: Right

MLB debut
- April 15, 1962, for the Minnesota Twins

Last MLB appearance
- May 2, 1962, for the Minnesota Twins

MLB statistics
- Win–loss record: 0–0
- Earned run average: 5.14
- Innings pitched: 7
- Stats at Baseball Reference

Teams
- Minnesota Twins (1962)

James Benjamin Manning (July 21, 1943 – January 1, 2020) was an American professional baseball player. Manning was a right-handed pitcher who had a brief, five-game stint at the age of 18 with the Minnesota Twins of Major League Baseball in 1962. He stood 6 feet 1 inch (1.85 m) tall, weighed 185 pounds (84 kg) and batted right-handed.

Manning signed with the Twins in 1961 and spent his first professional season in the low minor leagues, with the Wytheville Twins of the Appalachian League. He was kept on the Twins' opening-season 28-man roster (then permitted in MLB) in 1962, and made his debut in a home game April 15 against the Los Angeles Angels. Coming into the game in relief with Minnesota trailing, 6–0, he held the Angels scoreless on three hits in three innings pitched. In his fourth Major League game on April 28, he started against the Cleveland Indians at Municipal Stadium. Manning lasted only 2⅓ innings and gave up six runs (four earned) and seven hits; he had no decision in a game the Twins lost, 8–7. Altogether, he surrendered ten runs, four earned, and 14 hits in seven Major League innings, striking out three and walking one batter.

Manning played in the minors through 1966, largely for the Charlotte Hornets of what is now the Southern League.
