= Jim Lehew =

American baseball player (1937–2016)

- Pitcher
- Born: August 19, 1937; Baltimore, Maryland, U.S.
- Died: December 23, 2016 (aged 79); Grantsville, Maryland, U.S.
- Batted: Right Threw: Right

MLB debut
- September 13, 1961, for the Baltimore Orioles

Last MLB appearance
- May 6, 1962, for the Baltimore Orioles

MLB statistics
- Pitching record: 0–0
- Earned run average: 1.54
- Strikeouts Walks: 2; 3
- Innings pitched: 112/3
- Stats at Baseball Reference

Teams
- Baltimore Orioles (1961–1962)

James Anthony Lehew (August 19, 1937 – December 23, 2016) was an American professional baseball player. The right-handed relief pitcher appeared in eight games for the Baltimore Orioles during the 1961 and 1962 seasons. He was listed at 6 feet (1.83 m) tall and 185 pounds (84 kg).

Known for his submarine style delivery, Lehew was signed as an amateur free agent by the Orioles prior to the 1958 season. During his minor league career, Lehew slipped a disc in his back which nearly cost him his career.

Lehew's big-league trials occurred during the final month of the 1961 season and the early weeks of 1962, when teams were permitted to expand their rosters. In his eight appearances, he allowed 11 hits and three bases on balls in 11 2/3 innings pitched, but only two earned runs. He struck out two.

Lehew's career continued through 1964, with all seven of his pro seasons spent in the Baltimore organization.

Lehew died December 23, 2016, in Grantsville, Maryland at the age of 79.
