= Dick Luebke =

American baseball player (1935–1974)

- Pitcher
- Born: April 8, 1935; Chicago
- Died: December 4, 1974 (aged 39); San Diego, California
- Batted: Right Threw: Left

MLB debut
- August 10, 1962, for the Baltimore Orioles

Last MLB appearance
- September 24, 1962, for the Baltimore Orioles

MLB statistics
- Win–loss record: 0–1
- Earned run average: 2.70
- Innings pitched: 13 1/3
- Stats at Baseball Reference

Teams
- Baltimore Orioles (1962)

Richard Raymond Luebke (April 8, 1935 – December 4, 1974) was an American professional baseball player. A pitcher who threw left-handed and batted right-handed, Luebke was born in Chicago, stood 6 feet 4 inches (1.93 m) tall and weighed 200 pounds (91 kg). He spent a decade in minor league baseball and, in his only Major League audition, appeared in ten games as a relief pitcher for the 1962 Baltimore Orioles.

Luebke was in his ninth year as a member of the Oriole farm system when he was recalled late in the 1962 campaign. After a productive season as a left-handed relief pitcher for the Rochester Red Wings of the Triple-A International League – ten wins in 17 decisions, and an earned run average of 1.77 with 43 hits allowed in 61 innings pitched – Luebke made his Major League debut on August 10, 1962, at Fenway Park against the Boston Red Sox. In relief of Baltimore starting pitcher Robin Roberts, a future Hall of Famer, Luebke pitched a one-two-three eighth inning, retiring Eddie Bressoud, Carroll Hardy and Carl Yastrzemski in order. He was charged with his only MLB decision on September 7. He faced only one batter, Leon Wagner, who doubled and later scored the winning run in a 5–4 extra-inning win for the Los Angeles Angels. Nevertheless, Luebke performed creditably for Baltimore. In his ten appearances during August and September, he pitched 13 1/3 innings, allowed four earned runs, 12 hits and six bases on balls, with seven strikeouts.

During the offseason, however, the Orioles traded Luebke and minor-league infielder Willard Oplinger to the Cincinnati Reds for outfielder Joe Gaines. Luebke was not listed on the Reds' 40-man spring training roster for 1963, and spent the year with their Triple-A affiliate, the San Diego Padres of the Pacific Coast League, before leaving baseball.

He died at age 39 in San Diego in December 1974.
