= Chuck Estrada =

American baseball player (born 1938)

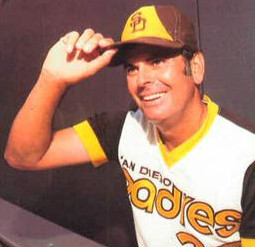
- Estrada in 1978
- Pitcher
- Born: February 15, 1938 (age 88); San Luis Obispo, California, U.S.
- Batted: Right Threw: Right

MLB debut
- April 21, 1960, for the Baltimore Orioles

Last MLB appearance
- June 11, 1967, for the New York Mets

MLB statistics
- Win–loss record: 50–44
- Earned run average: 4.07
- Strikeouts: 535
- Stats at Baseball Reference

Teams
- Baltimore Orioles (1960–1964); Chicago Cubs (1966); New York Mets (1967)

Career highlights and awards
- 2× All-Star (1960, 1960²); AL wins leader (1960)

Charles Leonard Estrada (born February 15, 1938) is an American former professional baseball player. He played in Major League Baseball as a right-handed pitcher from 1960 to 1967, playing for the Baltimore Orioles, Chicago Cubs, and New York Mets. Estrada was a member of the 1960's Baltimore Orioles Kiddie Korps. After his retirement from the major leagues, Estrada served as pitching coach in the majors.

== Early years ==
After completing high school, Estrada was signed by the Baltimore Orioles as an amateur free agent on September 27, 1956. Estrada's manager with the 1959 Vancouver Mounties, Charlie Metro, had this to say of his ace: "Chuck Estrada was another fine young talent who went up and won 18 games for the Orioles in 1960. He got a sore arm a couple of years later, and they accused me of ruining his arm. It was rumbled around, and I had to straighten everybody out. I said, 'Chuck had two great years after I had him at Vancouver. How could I have ruined his arm?' With Estrada, I had orders that he wasn't supposed to make more than seventy-five pitches in a seven-inning ball game.

"He was one of those guys you'd clock at ninety miles plus. He was a young guy, and he had a fine year.... Another time he was pitching a one-hitter, and he'd pitched his allotted seventy-five pitches. I was going to take him out. He talked me out of it. I didn't want to tell him I had orders up above. I said, 'This is your last inning. You'd better get him out. You need three pitches to get him out.' I had to do a little fudging on saying how many pitches he made. He made seventy-eight."

== With the Orioles ==
Chuck made his major league debut with the Orioles two seasons later, on April 21, 1960, in front of a crowd of 9,377 at Memorial Stadium. Estrada came in relief for starting pitcher Steve Barber in the 5th inning, and pitched two innings of one-hit ball with five strikeouts. Estrada spent the beginning of the 1960 season coming in relief, but he later joined the young Orioles starting pitching rotation, which also featured Steve Barber, Milt Pappas, Jerry Walker and Jack Fisher.

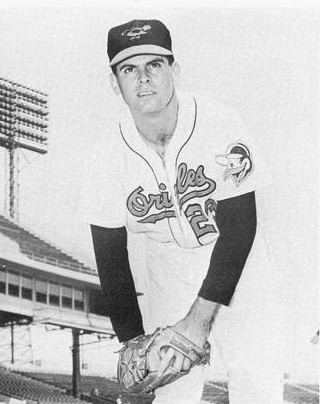
Estrada in 1963

Estrada's rookie season was perhaps the best season of his career. He pitched in a total of thirty-six games, and started twenty-five of them. He tied with Jim Perry for the American League lead with 18 wins that season. Only four other pitchers since 1900 had led their respective league without winning more than twenty games in the season. Estrada also was on top of the American League in hits allowed per nine innings, and finished with a twelve complete games, 144 strikeouts and a 3.58 earned run average. The All-Star Estrada finished second in the 1960 Rookie of the Year voting, falling distantly behind Orioles teammate Ron Hansen. He placed 12th in the American League Most Valuable Player Award voting, but he did win the year's TSN Pitcher of the Year Award. Estrada also was on the Topps All-Star Rookie Roster under the category of right-handed pitcher.

Estrada had another successful season in 1961, pitching in thirty three games for the Orioles. He had a 15–9 record, a 3.69 earned run average and 160 strikeouts in 212 innings of work. He again led the league in hits allowed per nine innings. However, Estrada again showed signs of wild pitching, as he issued a league-high 132 walks, thirty-one higher than that of his rookie season. He again placed second in the league by hitting ten batters in the season, finishing only one lower than the leader, Jim Kaat, of the Minnesota Twins.

The next season was disastrous for Estrada, as he led the league with seventeen losses. He only collected nine wins on the season, and his ERA ballooned to 3.83. He had 121 walks in 223.1 innings, finishing a close second behind Los Angeles Angels rookie southpaw Bo Belinsky.

Estrada's woes did not end, though. The following season, Estrada pitched in only eight games during the season. On June 8, 1963, Estrada suffered an elbow injury with bone chips and a spur in his right elbow, and was done for the season. The following season, Estrada came in as a relief/starting pitcher for the Orioles. It seemed the elbow injury had affected Estrada's pitching. He pitched only 54.2 innings that season, but he posted a 3–2 record with a 5.27 ERA.

== Across the league ==
Estrada did not pitch the following season, and he was sent to the California Angels by the Orioles as part of a conditional deal two months prior to the start of the 1966 season. Just weeks into the 1966 season, he was returned by the Angels to the Orioles. A day later, he was sent packing again, this time to the Chicago Cubs. The Cubs gave Estrada a shot as a starting pitcher on June 14, 1966, but he pitched less than an inning, giving up three hits and four earned runs and also hitting a batter. The Cubs then sent him to the bullpen and used him in relief for the remainder of the 1966 season. His stats only worsened, as he pitched a career-worst 7.30 ERA in only 12.1 innings of work. The 28-year-old Estrada was released by the Cubs on November 30, 1966. That same day, he was picked up by the New York Mets as a free agent. The first game Estrada pitched as a Met was on April 13, 1967. Estrada came in the sixth inning to relieve Tom Seaver on his major league debut, and Estrada pitched two innings of hitless ball. He picked up the win in the first start of Tom Seaver's Hall-of-Fame career. However, the rest of the season did not fare as nicely. In 22 innings of work, Estrada gave up 28 hits, walked 17 batters, and had a 9.41 ERA. So ended Estrada's major league baseball career as a player.

After retiring from the majors, Estrada found employment in the majors again, but this time as a pitching coach. He served as pitching coach for the Texas Rangers (1973), San Diego Padres (1978–1981), and Cleveland Indians (1983).

== See also ==
- List of Major League Baseball annual wins leaders
- TSN Pitcher of the Year (1960)

Preceded by Sid Hudson	Texas Rangers pitching coach 1973	Succeeded by Art Fowler
Preceded by Roger Craig	San Diego Padres pitching coach 1978–1981	Succeeded by Norm Sherry
Preceded by Mel Queen	Cleveland Indians pitching coach 1983	Succeeded by Don McMahon
