= Barry Shetrone =

American baseball player (1938–2001)

- Outfielder
- Born: July 6, 1938; Baltimore, Maryland, U.S.
- Died: July 18, 2001 (aged 63); Bowie, Maryland, U.S.
- Batted: Left Threw: Right

MLB debut
- July 27, 1959, for the Baltimore Orioles

Last MLB appearance
- June 7, 1963, for the Washington Senators

MLB statistics
- Batting average: .205
- Home runs: 1
- Runs batted in: 7
- Stats at Baseball Reference

Teams
- Baltimore Orioles (1959–1962); Washington Senators (1963)

Barry Stevan Shetrone (July 6, 1938 – July 18, 2001) was an American professional baseball player. An outfielder, he appeared in parts of five seasons (1959–1963) in Major League Baseball for the Baltimore Orioles and Washington Senators. He batted left-handed, threw right-handed, stood 6 feet 2 inches (1.88 m) tall and weighed 190 pounds (86 kg).

Born in Baltimore, Shetrone graduated from Southern High School, where he was a 1956 high school basketball All-American as chosen by Scholastic Coach magazine. He then signed with his hometown Orioles as an amateur free agent prior to the 1956 baseball season. He spent 31/2 years in the Baltimore farm system; in 1957 he led the Class C Arizona–Mexico League in hits and runs scored, batting .371. Recalled by the Orioles in midyear of 1959, he collected his first Major League hit, a single off Baseball Hall of Fame pitcher Jim Bunning, in his first MLB game and second at bat on July 27.

He played 58 of his 60 MLB games as an Oriole during trials from 1959 through 1962, and all 23 of his big-league hits came in a Baltimore uniform. They included two doubles, one triple and one home run, a solo blast hit September 1, 1962, off Dave Tyriver of the Cleveland Indians.

Shetrone was traded to the Senators on December 5, 1962. He went hitless in two at bats for Washington in May and June 1963, then returned to the minors for the rest of his pro career. He retired in 1967 after 12 pro seasons.

Barry Shetrone died in Bowie, Maryland, at the age of 63.
