= Marlan Coughtry =

American baseball player (1934–2016)

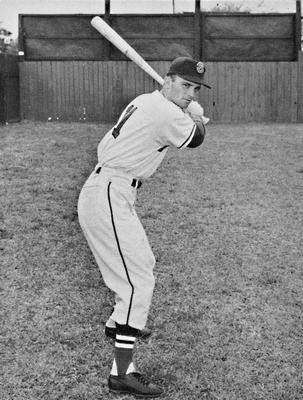
- Second baseman / Third baseman
- Born: September 11, 1934; Hollywood, California, U.S.
- Died: November 8, 2016 (aged 82); Vancouver, Washington, U.S.
- Batted: Left Threw: Right

MLB debut
- September 2, 1960, for the Boston Red Sox

Last MLB appearance
- July 15, 1962, for the Cleveland Indians

MLB statistics
- Batting average: .185
- Home runs: 0
- Runs batted in: 4
- Stats at Baseball Reference

Teams
- Boston Red Sox (1960); Los Angeles Angels (1962); Kansas City Athletics (1962); Cleveland Indians (1962)

James Marlan Coughtry (September 11, 1934 – November 8, 2016) was an American professional baseball infielder who appeared in 35 total games played over two seasons for four Major League Baseball clubs. Born in Hollywood, California, he batted left-handed, threw right-handed, stood 6 feet 1 inch (1.85 m) tall and weighed 170 pounds (77 kg). For his MLB career, Coughtry posted a .185 batting average (10-for-54) with six runs and four run batted in (RBI).

Coughtry played college baseball at Long Beach City College, and was signed by the Boston Red Sox in 1954. He began his professional career with the Corning Red Sox, and had a .333 batting average in 93 games with the team. In 1955, he was promoted to the San Jose Red Sox, and had a .295 batting average, 11 triples, and 11 home runs. He played in 72 games for the Albany Senators the following year, then spent 22 games with the Oklahoma City Indians in 1957. Coughtry missed the 1958 season, and spent both 1959 and 1960 between the Allentown Red Sox and the Minneapolis Millers. With Allentown in 1960, he had a .308 batting average and 13 home runs.

In September 1960, the Boston Red Sox brought him up to the major league roster, and he made his debut on September 2, playing in 15 games for a seventh-place team during the closing weeks of that season. In Ted Williams' final game for the Red Sox on September 28, 1960, Coughtry started at second base and collected two hits in three at bats. He hit a single and scored the tying run in the ninth inning to help give the Red Sox a win. The following season, Coughtry played for the Seattle Rainiers, and had a .296 batting average in 148 games.

After the 1961 season, the Los Angeles Angels selected Coughtry in the rule 5 draft, and he played in 11 games for the 1962 Angels. On May 12, as they were cutting their roster from 28 to 25 men, the Angels traded Coughtry to the Kansas City Athletics for outfielder Gordie Windhorn; then, on July 2, after six games with Kansas City, Coughtry's contract was sold to the Cleveland Indians. He played three games for the Indians before being sidelined by a sore back, and he retired from professional baseball shortly afterward.
