= Hal Brown =

American baseball player (1924–2015)

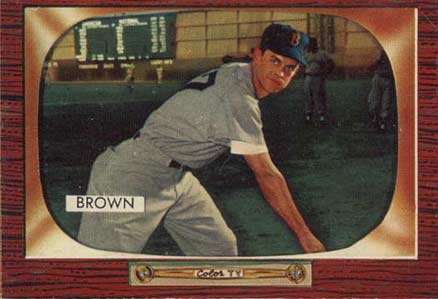
- Pitcher
- Born: December 11, 1924; Greensboro, North Carolina, U.S.
- Died: December 17, 2015 (aged 91); Greensboro, North Carolina, U.S.
- Batted: Right Threw: Right

MLB debut
- April 19, 1951, for the Chicago White Sox

Last MLB appearance
- September 16, 1964, for the Houston Colt .45s

MLB statistics
- Win–loss record: 85–92
- Earned run average: 3.81
- Strikeouts: 710
- Stats at Baseball Reference

Teams
- Chicago White Sox (1951–1952); Boston Red Sox (1953–1955); Baltimore Orioles (1955–1962); New York Yankees (1962); Houston Colt .45s (1963–1964)

Career highlights and awards
- Baltimore Orioles Hall of Fame

Hector Harold Brown (December 11, 1924 – December 17, 2015) was an American professional baseball player and right-handed pitcher. He played in Major League Baseball from 1951 through 1964 for the Chicago White Sox, Boston Red Sox, Baltimore Orioles, New York Yankees and Houston Colt .45s. Brown was a knuckleballer with outstanding control who worked as both a starting pitcher and as a relief pitcher. He played for all or portions of eight seasons (1955–1962) with the Orioles, posting a 62–48 won–lost record, and was inducted into the Baltimore Orioles Hall of Fame in 1991. He was a veteran of the United States Army Air Forces who served in the European theatre of World War II.

== Baseball career ==
Brown was born in Greensboro, North Carolina, and was nicknamed "Skinny" by his parents because he was a chubby child. He attended Greensboro High School and the University of North Carolina at Chapel Hill.

He weighed 180 pounds (82 kg) and stood 6 feet 2 inches (1.88 m) tall during his active career. Brown was 26 years old when the White Sox purchased his contract from the Triple-A Seattle Rainiers and he made his major league debut with the team on April 19, 1951. He spent two years with the White Sox before moving to the Red Sox, the team that had originally signed him to a pro contract in 1946. In 1953, Brown went 11–6 in 25 starts. He joined the Orioles in July 1955, winning 34 games for them from 1956 to 1959. In 1960, he compiled a 12–5 mark with a career-low 3.06 ERA for a contending Baltimore team that finished second in the American League. The next year, he went 10–6 with a 3.19 ERA. He was sold to the pennant-bound Yankees in September 1962.

Brown worked in two late-season games for the Yankees, but was ineligible for the Bombers' 1962 World Series roster because he was sold to them after September 1. He was purchased by the Colt .45s at the outset of the 1963 season. It was the third time that Houston general manager Paul Richards, who managed Brown in Seattle in 1950, had acquired the right-handed pitcher — he had done so in 1951 when Richards managed the White Sox and in 1955 when he was both general manager and field manager with the Orioles.

With Houston in 1963, Brown was a victim of poor run support, as he walked just eight batters in 141 innings and posted a 3.31 ERA, but tallied a 5–11 record. In 1964, his last major league season, he finished 3–15 with a 3.95 ERA.

In a 14-season major league career, Brown posted an 85–92 record with a 3.81 ERA in 358 appearances, including 211 starts, 47 complete games, 13 shutouts, 11 saves, 1,680 innings pitched, and a 1.83 strikeout-to-walk ratio (710-to-389). He allowed 1,677 hits, but only 389 bases on balls, 14 hit by pitches and 37 wild pitches as a major leaguer.

== League leader ==
- Twice led American League in fewest Walks/9IP (1.76 in 1959; 1.25 in 1960)
- Led AL in walks plus hits per inning pitched (WHIP) (1.113 in 1960)
- Baltimore Orioles Hall of Fame
