= Jack Spring =

American baseball player (1933–2015)

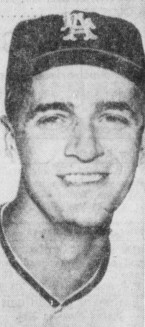
- Pitcher
- Born: March 11, 1933; Spokane, Washington, U.S.
- Died: August 2, 2015 (aged 82); Spokane, Washington, U.S.
- Batted: Right Threw: Left

MLB debut
- April 16, 1955, for the Philadelphia Phillies

Last MLB appearance
- August 1, 1965, for the Cleveland Indians

MLB statistics
- Win–loss record: 12–5
- Earned run average: 4.26
- Strikeouts: 86
- Innings pitched: 186
- Stats at Baseball Reference

Teams
- Philadelphia Phillies (1955); Boston Red Sox (1957); Washington Senators (1958); Los Angeles Angels (1961–1964); Chicago Cubs (1964); St. Louis Cardinals (1964); Cleveland Indians (1965)

Jack Russell Spring (March 11, 1933 – August 2, 2015) was an American Major League Baseball relief pitcher. The 6 ft 1 in (1.85 m), 175 lb (79 kg) left-hander played for the Philadelphia Phillies (1955), Boston Red Sox (1957), Washington Senators (1958), Los Angeles Angels (1961–64), Chicago Cubs (1964), St. Louis Cardinals (1964), and Cleveland Indians (1965).

Spring attended Lewis and Clark High School then both Gonzaga University in 1951 and Washington State University in 1952. At these schools, he played college baseball for the Bulldogs and Cougars, respectively.

Spring pitched in a total of six major league games for three clubs before being acquired by the expansion Los Angeles Angels in 1961. He started four games for L.A. and won three of them in September, then pitched exclusively in relief beginning in 1962. That season, his 57 appearances ranked third in the American League. He, along with Art Fowler, Tom Morgan, and later Julio Navarro, were the Angels' most reliable pitchers out of the bullpen during their second and third seasons. Spring's combined record for 1962 and 1963 was 7–2 with 8 saves and a 3.66 ERA in 102 games. He was traded by the Angels on May 15, 1964, and pitched for three more clubs before making his last major league appearance on August 31, 1965.

Career totals include a 12–5 record in 155 games pitched, five games started, 51 games finished, eight saves, and an ERA of 4.26. In 186 total innings pitched, Spring allowed 195 hits and 78 bases on balls; he fanned 86. He was part of one of the most infamous trades in MLB history, when on June 15, 1964, he accompanied Lou Brock in moving from the Cubs to the Cardinals in the Brock for Broglio deal; Brock led the Cardinals to the 1964 pennant and World Series championship, but Spring appeared in only two games for the Cardinals before being sent to the minor leagues.

He was inducted into the Inland Northwest Sports Hall of Fame in 2005 alongside former Utah Jazz basketball player John Stockton at a ceremony in Spokane, WA. He died on August 2, 2015, from Parkinson's disease.
