= Joe Bonikowski =

American baseball player (born 1941)

- Pitcher
- Born: January 16, 1941 (age 85); Philadelphia, Pennsylvania, U.S.
- Batted: Right Threw: Right

MLB debut
- April 12, 1962, for the Minnesota Twins

Last MLB appearance
- September 28, 1962, for the Minnesota Twins

MLB statistics
- Win–loss record: 5–7
- Earned run average: 3.88
- Strikeouts: 45
- Stats at Baseball Reference

Teams
- Minnesota Twins (1962)

Joseph Peter Bonikowski (born January 16, 1941) is an American former pitcher in Major League Baseball who played briefly for the Minnesota Twins during the 1962 season. Listed at 6 feet (1.8 m), 175 pounds (79 kg), Bonikowski batted and threw right-handed.

== Biography ==
Born in Philadelphia, Pennsylvania on January 16, 1941, Bonikowski attended Father Judge High School.

Bonikowski's professional baseball career lasted seven seasons (1959–1965). During his one MLB campaign, Bonikowski, then 21, posted a 5–7 record with a 3.88 ERA in 30 appearances, including 13 starts, three complete games and one save, giving up 47 runs (four unearned) on 95 hits and 38 walks while striking out 45 in 99 2/3 innings of work. He pitched back-to-back complete-game victories on June 2 and June 7, defeating the Washington Senators and Kansas City Athletics.

Bonikowski's minor league record was 40–55 (3.88) in 170 games and 793 innings.
