= Ted Bowsfield =

Canadian baseball player (born 1935)

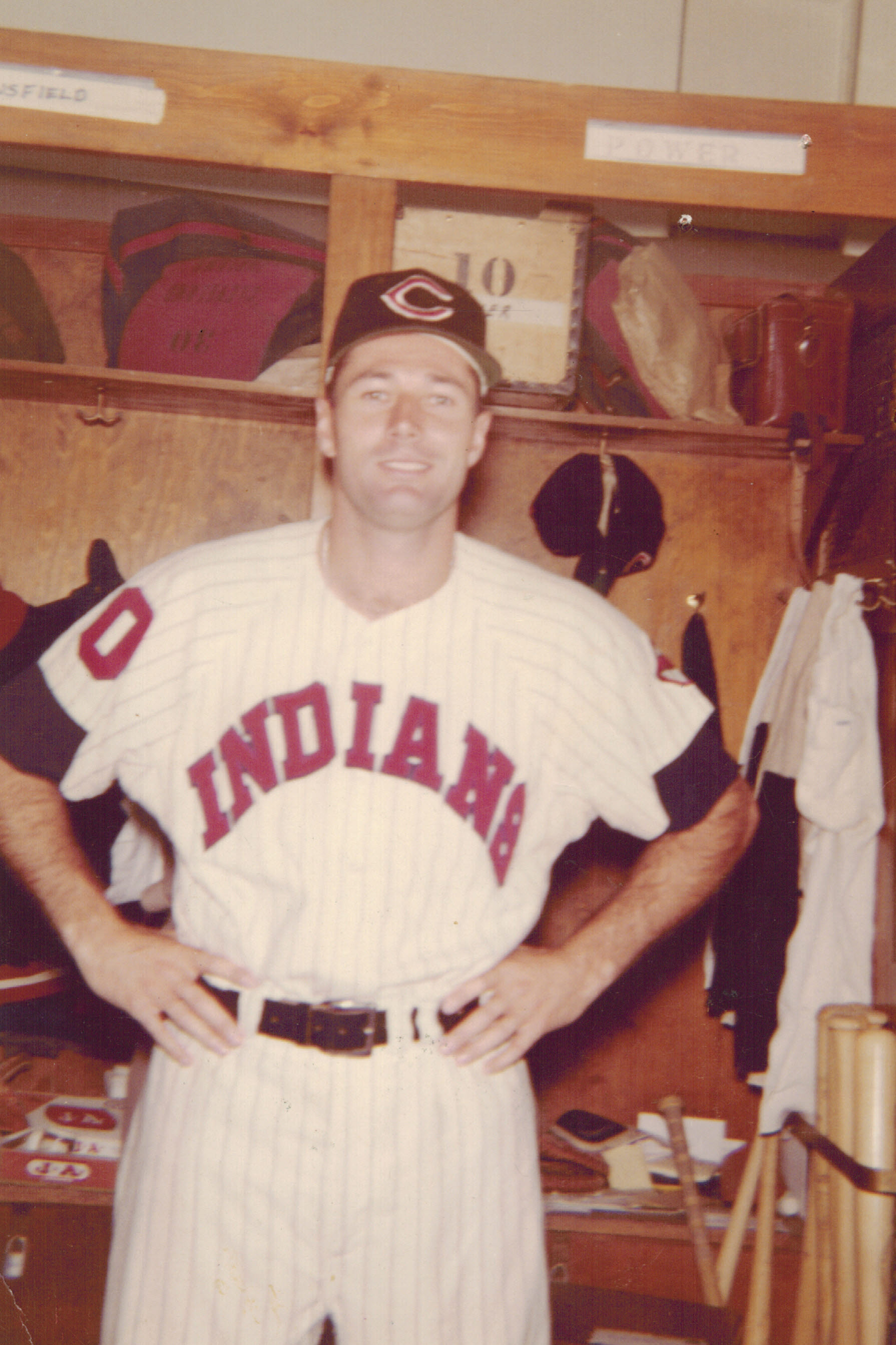
- Bowsfield in the Cleveland Indians locker room, July 1960
- Pitcher
- Born: January 10, 1935 (age 91); Vernon, British Columbia, Canada
- Batted: Right Threw: Left

MLB debut
- July 20, 1958, for the Boston Red Sox

Last MLB appearance
- October 4, 1964, for the Kansas City Athletics

MLB statistics
- Win–loss record: 37–39
- Earned run average: 4.35
- Strikeouts: 326
- Stats at Baseball Reference

Teams
- Boston Red Sox (1958–1960); Cleveland Indians (1960); Los Angeles Angels (1961–1962); Kansas City Athletics (1963–1964)

Member of the Canadian

Baseball Hall of Fame
- Induction: 1988

Edward Oliver Bowsfield (born January 10, 1935) is a Canadian former professional baseball player. A left-handed pitcher born in Vernon, British Columbia, and raised in Penticton, he appeared in 215 games pitched in Major League Baseball over seven seasons (1958–1964) for the Boston Red Sox, Cleveland Indians, Los Angeles Angels and Kansas City Athletics. He was listed as 6 feet 1 inch (1.85 m) tall and 185 pounds (84 kg).

== Professional career ==
In his seven-year big league career, Bowsfield went 37–39 with six saves and a 4.35 earned run average (ERA). Of his 215 career appearances, 86 were starts, 12 of which were complete games, including four shutouts.

=== Boston Red Sox ===
Bowsfield made his major-league debut with the Boston Red Sox on July 20, 1958. That season he went 4–2 with a 3.84 ERA in 16 games, 10 of which were starts. Three of Bowsfield's wins as a rookie came against the New York Yankees. Yankee Manager Casey Stengel described Bowsfield as "that fella that throws them ground balls."

Although he had some success in 1958, he struggled the following season by going 0–1 with a 15.00 ERA in five games, two of which were starts. In nine innings of work in 1959, Bowsfield yielded 15 earned runs on 16 hits and nine walks. Working primarily out of the bullpen, he rebounded a bit in 1960, going 1–2 with a 5.14 ERA in 17 games, including a pair of starts.

=== Cleveland Indians ===
Bowsfield's Red Sox career came to an end on June 13, 1960, when he and Marty Keough were traded to the Cleveland Indians for Russ Nixon and Carroll Hardy. Working out of the bullpen and in the starting rotation, Bowsfield went 3–4 with a 5.09 ERA in 11 outings, six of which were starts.

=== Los Angeles Angels ===
As the expansion Los Angeles Angels filled its roster through the 1961 MLB expansion draft, the new organization turned to the Indians' Bowfield as a key member of its pitching staff. At age 26, Bowsfield had the best season of his career in the Angels' inaugural season. He posted a record of 11–8 with a 3.73 ERA in 41 games, including 21 starts. Bowsfield put together another winning record in 1962, going 9–8 with a 4.40 ERA in 34 games, 25 of which were starts, for the Angels.

=== Kansas City Athletics ===
After the most successful seasons of his career, Bowsfield was sent to the Kansas City Athletics to complete a July 21 trade for Dan Osinski. In his two seasons with the A's, he worked primarily out of the bullpen, although he would make 20 starts during his time in Kansas City. Bowsfield went 5–7 with three saves and a 4.45 ERA in 41 games, 11 of which were starts, during the 1963 season. In 1964, he posted a 4–7 record with a 4.10 ERA in 50 games, including nine starts.

On May 11, 1963, during an away game against the Minnesota Twins, Bowsfield took a no-hitter through nine innings. Leading 5-0 into the bottom of the ninth, Vic Power singled to third registering the first hit of the game against Bowsfield.

== Post-playing career ==
Bowsfield was briefly a member of the Angels' front office after his playing career came to an end.

== See also ==
- List of Major League Baseball players from Canada
