= Julio Navarro (baseball) =

Puerto Rican baseball player (1934–2018)

- Pitcher
- Born: January 9, 1934; Vieques, Puerto Rico
- Died: January 24, 2018 (aged 84); Orlando, Florida, U.S.
- Batted: Right Threw: Right

MLB debut
- September 3, 1962, for the Los Angeles Angels

Last MLB appearance
- September 9, 1970, for the Atlanta Braves

MLB statistics
- Win–loss record: 7–9
- Earned run average: 3.65
- Strikeouts: 151
- Stats at Baseball Reference

Teams
- Los Angeles Angels (1962–1964); Detroit Tigers (1964–1966); Atlanta Braves (1970)

Julio Navarro Ventura (January 9, 1934 – January 24, 2018) was a Puerto Rican Major League Baseball relief pitcher. He played for the Los Angeles Angels (1962–64), Detroit Tigers (1964–66), and Atlanta Braves (1970).

The 5'11", 190 lb. right-hander with the nickname "Whiplash" was acquired by the Angels from the San Francisco Giants organization on September 2, 1962. Navarro made his major league debut in relief on September 3, 1962 against the New York Yankees in game 2 of a doubleheader at Yankee Stadium. He pitched three innings and gave up two earned runs in the 6–5 Angels victory. He struck out one batter, Roger Maris. He won his first major league game the very next day with 1.1 scoreless innings against New York. He retired Bobby Richardson to end the 8th, L.A. scored in the top of the 9th, and then he got Roger Maris, Elston Howard, and Johnny Blanchard to close out the game. He pitched seven more games that month, ending with a 4.70 ERA.

The next season, 1963, was Navarro's best statistically. He teamed with 40-year-old Art Fowler to give the Angels a pair of dependable closers. Navarro finished in the American League top ten for games pitched (57), saves (12), and games finished (30). He was 4–5 with an ERA of 2.89.

Navarro began the 1964 season in excellent fashion. He relieved in five games for the Angels with a 1.93 ERA, then was traded to the Detroit Tigers for outfielder/pitcher Willie Smith on April 28. He was never the same after that, pitching decently for Detroit but not with the degree of effectiveness he had shown with Los Angeles. He was out of the big leagues after 1966 but returned in 1970 to make 17 appearances for the Atlanta Braves.

Career totals include a 7–9 record in 130 games, 1 game started, 66 games finished, 17 saves, and an ERA of 3.65. He had 151 strikeouts in 212.1 innings pitched for a 6.40 K/9IP, higher than the major league average during his era. Very good defensively, he handled 49 out of 50 total chances successfully for a fielding percentage of .980.

He is the father of former major league pitcher Jaime Navarro.

Navarro died peacefully January 24, 2018 in Orlando, Florida surrounded by his beloved wife and children. He was buried at Cementerio Los Cipreses in Bayamón, Puerto Rico.
