= Gordie Windhorn =

American baseball player (1933–2022)

- Outfielder
- Born: December 19, 1933; Watseka, Illinois, U.S.
- Died: May 21, 2022 (aged 88); Danville, Virginia, U.S.
- Batted: Right Threw: Right

Professional debut
- MLB: September 10, 1959, for the New York Yankees
- NPB: March 14, 1964, for the Hankyu Braves

Last appearance
- MLB: July 20, 1962, for the Los Angeles Angels
- NPB: October 14, 1969, for the Hankyu Braves

MLB statistics
- Batting average: .176
- Home runs: 2
- Runs scored: 20

NPB statistics
- Batting average: .255
- Home runs: 86
- Runs batted in: 217
- Stats at Baseball Reference

Teams
- New York Yankees (1959); Los Angeles Dodgers (1961); Kansas City Athletics (1962); Los Angeles Angels (1962); Hankyu Braves (1964–1969)

Gordon Ray Windhorn (December 19, 1933 – May 21, 2022) was an American professional baseball player who appeared in 95 games played over parts of three seasons (1959, 1961 and 1962) in Major League Baseball as an outfielder for the New York Yankees, Los Angeles Dodgers, Kansas City Athletics, and Los Angeles Angels. He also played six seasons in Japan for the Hankyu Braves from 1964–1969. Born in Watseka, Illinois, he threw and batted right-handed, and was listed as 6 feet 1 inch (1.85 m) tall and 185 pounds (84 kg). He attended Arizona State University.

Windhorn was an Arizona state high school sprinting champion at North High School in Phoenix. He attended a New York Giants open tryout in 1952 reportedly to keep a friend company but was offered a contract by Giants scout Dutch Ruether.

Windhorn's professional career extended from 1952 through 1963. He signed originally with the New York Giants, but made his MLB debut with the Yankees in September 1959 when he went hitless in 11 at bats. Traded to the Los Angeles Dodgers at the beginning of the 1960 campaign, he played for their Triple-A affiliates the Montreal Royals (1960) and Omaha Dodgers (early 1961), before his recall to Los Angeles for his most successful MLB stint. Playing in 34 games for the 1961 Dodgers, he had eight hits in 33 at bats, and slugged his only two big-league home runs: they came in back-to-back games against the Philadelphia Phillies September 11-12. He rounded out his MLB tenure in 1962 by getting into 54 games combined for the Athletics and Angels, then spent 1963 at Triple-A before decamping for Japan.

As a major leaguer, Windhorn collected 19 hits, 11 of them for extra bases; he batted .176 with eight runs batted in. In Nippon Professional Baseball, he got into 641 games, with 501 hits, including 86 homers, and posted a .255 batting mark.
