= Art Fowler =

American baseball player (1922–2007)

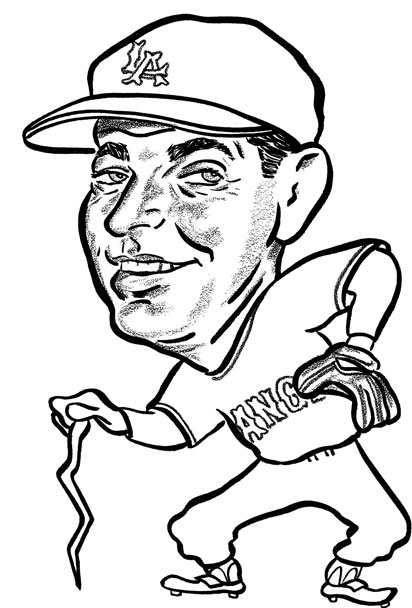
- Pitcher
- Born: July 3, 1922; Converse, South Carolina, U.S.
- Died: January 29, 2007 (aged 84); Spartanburg, South Carolina, U.S.
- Batted: Right Threw: Right

MLB debut
- April 17, 1954, for the Cincinnati Reds

Last MLB appearance
- May 4, 1964, for the Los Angeles Angels

MLB statistics
- Win–loss record: 54–51
- Earned run average: 4.03
- Strikeouts: 539
- Stats at Baseball Reference

Teams
- As player: Cincinnati Redlegs (1954–1957); Los Angeles Dodgers (1959); Los Angeles Angels (1961–1964); As coach: Minnesota Twins (1969); Detroit Tigers (1971–1973); Texas Rangers (1973–1975); New York Yankees (1977–1979, 1983, 1988); Oakland Athletics (1980–1982)

John Arthur Fowler (July 3, 1922 – January 29, 2007) was an American pitcher and pitching coach in Major League Baseball. The 5 ft 11 in (1.80 m), 180 lb (82 kg) right-hander was signed by the New York Giants as an amateur free agent before the 1944 season. He played for the Cincinnati Redlegs (1954–1957), Los Angeles Dodgers (1959), and Los Angeles Angels (1961–1964), and went on to be associated with manager Billy Martin as a coach with five major league teams, including four stops with the New York Yankees.

== Career ==
Fowler was born in Converse, South Carolina. His brother Jesse pitched for the 1924 St. Louis Cardinals. Jesse was nearly 24 years older than Art, and the Fowlers hold the record for the largest age difference between brothers who played Major League baseball. Art Fowler pitched 10 years in the minor leagues with a record of 140–94. He led Southern Association pitchers in games pitched (54), innings pitched (261), hits allowed (273), and ERA (3.03) while playing for the Atlanta Crackers in 1953, and led Carolina League pitchers with 23 wins while playing for the Danville Leafs in 1945.

Finally reaching the major leagues at the age of 31, Fowler made his major league debut in relief on April 17, 1954, against the Milwaukee Braves at Milwaukee County Stadium. His first big league win came in his first start, a 3–2 victory over the Chicago Cubs on April 25 at Crosley Field. He had a good rookie season, finishing 12–10 with a 3.83 earned run average. He ranked ninth in the National League with 227 2/3 innings pitched. In 1955 and 1956, his last years as a regular starter, he combined for a 22–21 record with an ERA of 3.97. He started seven games for Cincinnati in 1957, and then appeared almost exclusively in relief thereafter.

"If running is so important, Jesse Owens would be a 20-game winner."

— Art Fowler

After a poor year with the Dodgers in 1959, Fowler resurfaced in the major leagues in 1961 at age 38 with the expansion Los Angeles Angels. He, along with Tom Morgan, and later Jack Spring and Julio Navarro, were the Angels' most reliable pitchers out of the bullpen during their first three seasons. Fowler's combined record from 1961 to 1963 was 14–14 with 26 saves and a 2.96 ERA in 158 games. He was released by the Angels on May 15, 1964, at age 41, the oldest player to appear in an American League game that season. His major league career totals include a 54–51 record in 362 games pitched, 90 games started, 25 complete games, 4 shutouts, 134 games finished, 32 saves, and an ERA of 4.03.

He spent the rest of 1964 as a batting practice pitcher for the Angels, but his active playing career was not over. In 1965, he signed with the Triple-A Denver Bears as a pitcher-coach, and between 1965–68 and in 1970 he worked in a total of 211 games pitched and compiled a 27–15 won-lost record. On May 27, 1968, Billy Martin became manager of the Bears, and he and Fowler began a long friendship and professional association. Fowler served as Martin's pitching coach with the Minnesota Twins (1969), Detroit Tigers (1971–73), Texas Rangers (1974–75), Yankees (1977–79, 1983, 1988), and Oakland Athletics (1980–82). Under his tutelage, Ron Guidry won the Cy Young Award in 1978.

Fowler died on January 29, 2007, at age 84 in Spartanburg, South Carolina. He is buried in Greenlawn Memorial Gardens, Spartanburg, Spartanburg County, South Carolina.

In the 2007 ESPN miniseries The Bronx is Burning, Fowler was portrayed by actor Bill Buell.
