= 1961 Washington Senators season =

1961 Washington Senators
- League: American League
- Ballpark: Griffith Stadium
- City: Washington, D.C.
- Record: 61–100 (.379)
- League place: 9th
- Owners: Elwood Richard Quesada
- General managers: Ed Doherty
- Managers: Mickey Vernon
- Television: WTOP
- Radio: WTOP (Dan Daniels, John MacLean)

The 1961 Washington Senators season was the team's inaugural season, having been established as a replacement for the previous franchise of the same name, which relocated to the Twin Cities of Minnesota following the 1960 season, becoming the Minnesota Twins. The Senators finished in a tie for ninth place in the ten-team American League with a record of 61–100, 47 1/2 games behind the World Champion New York Yankees. It was also the team's only season at Griffith Stadium before moving its games to D.C. Stadium for the following season. The expansion team drew 597,287 fans, tenth and last in the circuit. The old Senators had drawn 743,404 fans in 1960.

== Offseason ==
The Senators, along with the Los Angeles Angels, were the first ever American League expansion teams. Both teams participated in Major League Baseball's first ever expansion draft. The Senators used their first pick in the 1960 Major League Baseball expansion draft to select pitcher Bobby Shantz from the New York Yankees (while the Angels picked Eli Grba). Grba wound up playing two-plus seasons for Los Angeles before returning to the minor leagues. However, Shantz never played for the Senators, as he was traded just two days later to the Pittsburgh Pirates for Harry Bright, Bennie Daniels, and R. C. Stevens, all of whom played for the Senators in 1961.

A 1992 Associated Press article which looked prospectively to the Rockies and Marlins expansion draft and retroactively at previous expansion drafts stated: "The Senators drafted for experience and got burned when players such as Dave Sisler, John Klippstein, Tom Sturdivant, Dale Long, Bobby Klaus and Gene Woodling didn't produce."

=== Notable transactions ===
- November 28, 1960: Ray Semproch was drafted by the Senators from the Los Angeles Dodgers in the 1960 rule 5 draft.
- December 14, 1960: 1960 MLB expansion draft
  - Jim King was drafted by the Senators from the Cleveland Indians.
  - Coot Veal was drafted by the Senators from the Detroit Tigers.

== Regular season ==
As an expansion team, the Senators were not expected to do well. They finished tied for last in the league with the Kansas City Athletics. They also finished 9 games behind their expansion brethren, the Angels. One bright spot was pitcher Dick Donovan, who led the American League in earned run average and WHIP, making the All-Star team and finishing 17th in league MVP voting.

=== Season standings ===
American League
Team	W	L	Pct.	GB	Home	Road
New York Yankees	109	53	.673	—	65‍–‍16	44‍–‍37
Detroit Tigers	101	61	.623	8	50‍–‍31	51‍–‍30
Baltimore Orioles	95	67	.586	14	48‍–‍33	47‍–‍34
Chicago White Sox	86	76	.531	23	53‍–‍28	33‍–‍48
Cleveland Indians	78	83	.484	30½	40‍–‍41	38‍–‍42
Boston Red Sox	76	86	.469	33	50‍–‍31	26‍–‍55
Minnesota Twins	70	90	.438	38	36‍–‍44	34‍–‍46
Los Angeles Angels	70	91	.435	38½	46‍–‍36	24‍–‍55
Kansas City Athletics	61	100	.379	47½	33‍–‍47	28‍–‍53
Washington Senators	61	100	.379	47½	33‍–‍46	28‍–‍54

=== Record vs. opponents ===
1961 American League record Sources:
Team	BAL	BOS	CWS	CLE	DET	KCA	LAA	MIN	NYY	WAS
Baltimore	—	11–7	11–7	9–9	9–9	13–5	8–10	11–7	9–9–1	14–4
Boston	7–11	—	9–9	5–13	8–10	10–8	11–7–1	11–7	5–13	10–8
Chicago	7–11	9–9	—	12–6	6–12	14–4	10–8	9–9–1	6–12	13–5
Cleveland	9–9	13–5	6–12	—	6–12	8–9	10–8	10–8	4–14	12–6
Detroit	9–9	10–8	12–6	12–6	—	12–6–1	14–4	11–7	8–10	13–5
Kansas City	5–13	8–10	4–14	9–8	6–12–1	—	9–9	7–11	4–14	9–9
Los Angeles	10–8	7–11–1	8–10	8–10	4–14	9–9	—	8–9	6–12	10–8
Minnesota	7–11	7–11	9–9–1	8–10	7–11	11–7	9–8	—	4–14	8–9
New York	9–9–1	13–5	12–6	14–4	10–8	14–4	12–6	14–4	—	11–7
Washington	4–14	8–10	5–13	6–12	5–13	9–9	8–10	9–8	7–11	—

=== Opening Day lineup ===
In the first game in franchise history, the "Presidential Opener" then held every year in Washington, the Senators were defeated by the Chicago White Sox, 4–3, on Monday, April 10, 1961. With leadoff man Coot Veal getting its first-ever hit (an infield single) in the first inning, Washington jumped out to a quick 2–0 advantage and led 3–1 after two innings. But the Senators were blanked thereafter and committed four errors, leading to two unearned runs, as Chicago battled back to win. Roy Sievers, former star of the previous Washington franchise, drove in a pair of White Sox runs with a home run and a sacrifice fly. It was the last Presidential Opener in the history of Griffith Stadium, and the first one in which John F. Kennedy threw out the first ball.

5	Coot Veal	SS
6	Billy Klaus	3B
9	Marty Keough	RF
25	Dale Long	1B
14	Gene Woodling	LF
1	Willie Tasby	CF
4	Danny O'Connell	2B
8	Pete Daley	C
20	Dick Donovan	P

=== Roster ===
1961 Washington Senators
Roster
Pitchers: 34 Carl Bouldin; 16 Pete Burnside; 23 Tom Cheney; 21 Bennie Daniels; 20 Dick Donovan; 26 John Gabler; 19 Mike Garcia; 47 Roy Heiser; 23 Rudy Hernández; 18 Ed Hobaugh; 17 Johnny Klippstein; 22 Marty Kutyna; 24 Héctor Maestri; 24 Carl Mathias; 27 Joe McClain; 34 Claude Osteen; 15 Dave Sisler; 35,47 Tom Sturdivant; 19 Hal Woodeshick	Catchers: 8 Pete Daley; 11 Dutch Dotterer; 12 Gene Green; 19 Ken Retzer; Infielders: 28 Chet Boak; 10 Harry Bright; 2 Ed Brinkman; 7 Chuck Cottier; 29 Bob Johnson; 6 Billy Klaus; 25 Dale Long; 29 Jim Mahoney; 4 Danny O'Connell; 2 R. C. Stevens; 29 Ron Stillwell; 5 Coot Veal; 11 Bud Zipfel	Outfielders: 31 Joe Hicks; 32 Chuck Hinton; 9 Marty Keough; 30 Jim King; 1 Willie Tasby; 14 Gene Woodling	Manager: 3 Mickey Vernon; Coaches: 41 George Case; 42 Rollie Hemsley; 40 Sid Hudson; 43 George Susce

== Game log ==
=== Regular season ===
Legend
	Senators win
	Senators loss
	Postponement
	Eliminated from playoff spot
**Bold**	Senators team member

1961 game log: 61–100 (Home: 33–46; Away: 28–54)
April: 5–11 (Home: 2–7; Away: 3–4)

#	Date	(ET)	Opponent	Score	Win	Loss	Save	Time of Game	Attendance	Record	Streak

May: 17–12 (Home: 8–4; Away: 9–8)

#	Date	(ET)	Opponent	Score	Win	Loss	Save	Time of Game	Attendance	Record	Streak

June: 11–19 (Home: 5–7; Away: 6–12)

#	Date	(ET)	Opponent	Score	Win	Loss	Save	Time of Game	Attendance	Record	Streak

July: 12–14 (Home: 9–6; Away: 3–8)

#	Date	(ET)	Opponent	Score	Win	Loss	Save	Time of Game	Attendance	Record	Streak
—	July 10	3:00 p.m. EDT	30th All-Star Game	American League vs. National League (Candelstick Park, San Francisco, California)							
—	July 30	1:00 p.m. EDT	31st All-Star Game	National League vs. American League (Fenway Park, Boston, Massachusetts)							

August: 5–24 (Home: 4–14; Away: 1–10)

#	Date	(ET)	Opponent	Score	Win	Loss	Save	Time of Game	Attendance	Record	Streak

September: 11–19 (Home: 5–8; Away: 6–11)

#	Date	(ET)	Opponent	Score	Win	Loss	Save	Time of Game	Attendance	Record	Streak

October: 0–1 (Home: 0–0; Away: 0–2)

#	Date	(ET)	Opponent	Score	Win	Loss	Save	Time of Game	Attendance	Record	Streak

=== Detailed records ===
**American League**
Opponent	Home	Away	Total	Pct.	Runs scored	Runs allowed
Baltimore Orioles
Boston Red Sox
Chicago White Sox
Cleveland Indians
Detroit Tigers
Kansas City Athletics
Los Angeles Angels
Minnesota Twins
New York Yankees	5–4	2–7	7–11	.389	82	96
**Washington Senators**	—	—	—	—	—	—
	**5–4**	**2–7**	**7–11**	**.389**	**82**	**96**

== Player stats ==
= Indicates team leader

=== Batting ===
==== Starters by position ====
Note: Pos = Position; G = Games played; AB = At bats; H = Hits; Avg. = Batting average; HR = Home runs; RBI = Runs batted in

Pos	Player	G	AB	H	Avg.	HR	RBI
C	Gene Green	110	364	102	.280	18	62
1B	Dale Long	123	377	94	.249	17	49
2B	Chuck Cottier	101	337	79	.234	2	34
SS	Coot Veal	69	218	44	.202	0	8
3B	Danny O'Connell	138	493	128	.260	1	37
LF	Chuck Hinton	106	339	88	.260	6	34
CF	Willie Tasby	141	494	124	.251	17	63
RF	Gene Woodling	110	342	107	.313	10	57

==== Other batters ====
Note: G = Games played; AB = At bats; H = Hits; Avg. = Batting average; HR = Home runs; RBI = Runs batted in

Player	G	AB	H	Avg.	HR	RBI
Marty Keough	135	390	97	.249	9	34
Jim King	110	263	71	.270	11	46
Billy Klaus	91	251	57	.227	7	30
Bob Johnson	61	224	66	.295	6	28
Pete Daley	72	203	39	.192	2	17
Harry Bright	72	183	44	.240	4	21
Bud Zipfel	50	170	34	.200	4	18
Jim Mahoney	43	108	26	.241	0	6
R.C. Stevens	33	62	8	.129	0	2
Ken Retzer	16	53	18	.340	1	3
Joe Hicks	12	29	5	.172	1	1
Dutch Dotterer	7	19	5	.263	0	1
Ron Stillwell	8	16	2	.125	0	1
Ed Brinkman	4	11	1	.091	0	0
Chet Boak	5	7	0	.000	0	0

=== Pitching ===
==== Starting pitchers ====
Note: G = Games pitched; IP = Innings pitched; W = Wins; L = Losses; ERA = Earned run average; SO = Strikeouts

Player	G	IP	W	L	ERA	SO
Joe McClain	33	212.0	8	18	3.86	76
Bennie Daniels	32	212.0	12	11	3.44	110
Dick Donovan	23	168.2	10	10	2.40	62
Ed Hobaugh	26	126.1	7	9	4.42	67
Tom Sturdivant	15	80.0	2	6	4.61	39
Hal Woodeshick	7	40.1	3	2	4.02	24
Claude Osteen	3	18.1	1	1	4.91	14
Héctor Maestri	1	6.0	0	1	1.50	2

==== Other pitchers ====
Note: G = Games pitched; IP = Innings pitched; W = Wins; L = Losses; ERA = Earned run average; SO = Strikeouts

Player	G	IP	W	L	ERA	SO
Marty Kutyna	50	143.0	6	8	3.97	64
Pete Burnside	33	113.1	4	9	4.53	56
John Gabler	29	92.2	3	8	4.86	33
Tom Cheney	10	29.2	1	3	8.80	20
Carl Mathias	4	13.2	0	1	11.20	7
Carl Bouldin	2	3.1	0	1	16.20	2

==== Relief pitchers ====
Note: G = Games pitched; W = Wins; L = Losses; SV = Saves; ERA = Earned run average; SO = Strikeouts

Player	G	W	L	SV	ERA	SO
Dave Sisler	45	2	8	11	4.18	30
Johnny Klippstein	42	2	2	0	6.78	41
Mike Garcia	16	0	1	0	4.74	14
Rudy Hernández	7	0	1	0	3.00	4
Roy Heiser	3	0	0	0	6.35	1

== Farm system ==
Level	Team	League	Manager
D	Pensacola Angels	Alabama–Florida League	Archie Wilson
D	Middlesboro Senators	Appalachian League	Lew Morton

LEAGUE CHAMPIONS: Middlesboro

== Awards and honors ==
1961 American League ERA leader

- Dick Donovan
