= 1962 Washington Senators season =

1962 Washington Senators
- League: American League
- Ballpark: D.C. Stadium
- City: Washington, D.C.
- Record: 60–101 (.373)
- League place: 10th
- Owners: Elwood Richard Quesada
- General managers: Ed Doherty
- Managers: Mickey Vernon
- Television: WTOP
- Radio: WTOP (Dan Daniels, John MacLean)

The 1962 Washington Senators season involved the Senators finishing tenth in the American League with a record of 60 wins and 101 losses, 35 1/2 games behind the World Champion New York Yankees. 1962 was the first season in which the Senators played their home games at D.C. Stadium.

== Offseason ==
- October 5, 1961: Dick Donovan, Gene Green, and Jim Mahoney were traded by the Senators to the Cleveland Indians for Jimmy Piersall.
- November 21, 1961: Coot Veal was purchased from the Senators by the Pittsburgh Pirates.
- December 15, 1961: Marty Keough and Johnny Klippstein were traded by the Senators to the Cincinnati Reds for Dave Stenhouse and Bob Schmidt.

== Regular season ==
=== Season standings ===
American League
Team	W	L	Pct.	GB	Home	Road
New York Yankees	96	66	.593	—	50‍–‍30	46‍–‍36
Minnesota Twins	91	71	.562	5	45‍–‍36	46‍–‍35
Los Angeles Angels	86	76	.531	10	40‍–‍41	46‍–‍35
Detroit Tigers	85	76	.528	10½	49‍–‍33	36‍–‍43
Chicago White Sox	85	77	.525	11	43‍–‍38	42‍–‍39
Cleveland Indians	80	82	.494	16	43‍–‍38	37‍–‍44
Baltimore Orioles	77	85	.475	19	44‍–‍38	33‍–‍47
Boston Red Sox	76	84	.475	19	39‍–‍40	37‍–‍44
Kansas City Athletics	72	90	.444	24	39‍–‍42	33‍–‍48
Washington Senators	60	101	.373	35½	27‍–‍53	33‍–‍48

=== Record vs. opponents ===
1962 American League record Sources:
Team	BAL	BOS	CWS	CLE	DET	KCA	LAA	MIN	NYY	WAS
Baltimore	—	8–10	9–9	11–7	2–16	10–8	8–10	6–12	11–7	12–6
Boston	10–8	—	8–10	7–11	11–6	10–8	6–12	10–8	6–12	8–9
Chicago	9–9	10–8	—	12–6	9–9	9–9	10–8	8–10	8–10	10–8
Cleveland	7–11	11–7	6–12	—	10–8	11–7	9–9	6–12	11–7	9–9
Detroit	16–2	6–11	9–9	8–10	—	12–6	11–7	5–13	7–11	11–7
Kansas City	8–10	8–10	9–9	7–11	6–12	—	6–12	8–10	5–13	15–3
Los Angeles	10–8	12–6	8–10	9–9	7–11	12–6	—	9–9	8–10	11–7
Minnesota	12–6	8–10	10–8	12–6	13–5	10–8	9–9	—	7–11	10–8–1
New York	7–11	12–6	10–8	7–11	11–7	13–5	10–8	11–7	—	15–3
Washington	6–12	9–8	8–10	9–9	7–11	3–15	7–11	8–10–1	3–15	—

=== Roster ===
1962 Washington Senators
Roster
Pitchers: 17 Bob Baird; 27,38 Carl Bouldin; 16 Pete Burnside; 23 Tom Cheney; 21 Bennie Daniels; 17 Fred Green; 28 Steve Hamilton; 19 Jim Hannan; 18 Ed Hobaugh; 1 Jack Jenkins; 22 Marty Kutyna; 27 Joe McClain; 24,34 Claude Osteen; 20 Ray Rippelmeyer; 33 Don Rudolph; 15 Dave Stenhouse	Catchers: 9 Ken Retzer; 12 Bob Schmidt; Infielders: 10 Harry Bright; 38 Ed Brinkman; 7 Chuck Cottier; 5 Ken Hamlin; 29 Bob Johnson; 34 John Kennedy; 25 Dale Long; 4 Danny O'Connell; 6,48 Johnny Schaive; 8 Ron Stillwell; 11 Bud Zipfel	Outfielders: 31 Joe Hicks; 32 Chuck Hinton; 30 Jim King; 25 Don Lock; 37 Jimmy Piersall; 1 Willie Tasby; 14 Gene Woodling	Manager: 3 Mickey Vernon; Coaches: 41 George Case; 42 Rollie Hemsley; 40 Sid Hudson; 43 George Susce

== Game log ==
=== Regular season ===
Legend
	Senators win
	Senators loss
	Senators tie
	Postponement
	Eliminated from playoff race
**Bold**	Senators team member

1962 regular season game log: 60–101–1 (Home: 27–53; Away: 33–48–1)
April: 2–13 (Home: 1–7; Away: 1–6)

#	Date	Time (ET)	Opponent	Score	Win	Loss	Save	Time of Game	Attendance	Record	Box/ Streak
12	April 27		Yankees	L 8–10	Stafford (1–2)	**Burnside** (1–1)	Bridges (1)	3:17	20,120	2–10	L10
13	April 28		Yankees	L 3–10				2:34	9,299	2–11	L11
14 (1)	April 29		Yankees	L 2–3			—	2:00	—	2–12	L12
15 (2)	April 29		Yankees	L 6–11			—	2:44	31,466	2–13	L13

May: 11–18 (Home: 6–10; Away: 5–8)

#	Date	Time (ET)	Opponent	Score	Win	Loss	Save	Time of Game	Attendance	Record	Box/ Streak
18	May 5		@ Yankees	L 6–7				2:35	16,992	3–15	L2
19 (1)	May 6		@ Yankees	**W** 4–2				2:02	—	4–15	W1
20 (2)	May 6		@ Yankees	L 0–8			—	2:34	23,940	4–16	L1

June: 13–16 (Home: 8–8; Away: 5–8)

#	Date	Time (ET)	Opponent	Score	Win	Loss	Save	Time of Game	Attendance	Record	Box/ Streak

July: 13–15 (Home: 4–8; Away: 9–7)

#	Date	Time (ET)	Opponent	Score	Win	Loss	Save	Time of Game	Attendance	Record	Box/ Streak
—	July 10	1:00 p.m. EDT	32nd All-Star Game	National League vs. American League (D.C. Stadium, Washington, D.C.)							
90	July 20		@ Yankees	L 2–3			Bridges (12)	1:56	20,255	33–57	L1
91	July 21		@ Yankees	L 3–4				2:17	23,565	33–58	L2
92 (1)	July 22		@ Yankees	**W** 3–2		Stafford (8–6)	—	2:12	—	34–58	W1
93 (2)	July 22		@ Yankees	**W** 8–3			—	2:14	27,548	35–58	W2
—	July 30	2:00 p.m. EDT	33rd All-Star Game	American League vs. National League (Wrigley Field, Chicago, Illinois)							
101	July 31		Yankees	L 5–9	Stafford (9–6)			2:41	30,421	39–62	L2

August: 14–22–1 (Home: 4–11; Away: 10–11–1)

#	Date	Time (ET)	Opponent	Score	Win	Loss	Save	Time of Game	Attendance	Record	Box/ Streak
102 (1)	August 1		Yankees	L 4–6			—	2:23	—	39–63	L3
103 (2)	August 1		Yankees	L 2–5 (11)				2:48	48,147	39–64	L4

September: 7–17 (Home: 4–9; Away: 3–8)

#	Date	Time (ET)	Opponent	Score	Win	Loss	Save	Time of Game	Attendance	Record	Box/ Streak
155	September 18		Yankees	L 1–7			—	2:05	16,824	58–96–1	L2
156	September 19		Yankees	L 5–8	Bridges (8–3)			2:46	12,126	58–97–1	L3
159	September 25		@ Yankees	L 3–8			—	2:24	11,702	59–99–1	L1
160	September 26		@ Yankees	L 5–9				2:03	4,140	59–100–1	L2

=== Detailed records ===
American League
Opponent	W	L	WP	RS	RA
New York Yankees	3	15	0.167	70	115
**Washington Senators**					
Season Total	3	15	0.167	70	115

Month	Games	Won	Lost	Win %	RS	RA
April
May
June
July
August
September
Total

	Games	Won	Lost	Win %	RS	RA
Home
Away
Total

== Player stats ==
= Indicates team leader

=== Batting ===
==== Starters by position ====
Note: Pos = Position; G = Games played; AB = At bats; H = Hits; Avg. = Batting average; HR = Home runs; RBI = Runs batted in

Pos	Player	G	AB	H	Avg.	HR	RBI
C	Ken Retzer	109	340	97	.285	8	37
1B	Harry Bright	113	392	107	.273	17	67
2B	Chuck Cottier	136	443	107	.242	6	40
SS	Ken Hamlin	98	292	74	.253	3	22
3B	Bob Johnson	135	466	134	.288	12	43
LF	Don Lock	71	225	57	.253	12	37
CF	Jimmy Piersall	135	471	115	.244	4	31
RF	Jim King	132	333	81	.243	11	35

==== Other batters ====
Note: G = Games played; AB = At bats; H = Hits; Avg. = Batting average; HR = Home runs; RBI = Runs batted in

Player	G	AB	H	Avg.	HR	RBI
Chuck Hinton	151	542	168	.310	17	75
Bob Schmidt	88	256	62	.242	10	31
Danny O'Connell	84	236	62	.263	2	18
Johnny Schaive	82	225	57	.253	6	29
Dale Long	67	191	46	.241	4	24
Bud Zipfel	68	184	44	.239	6	21
Joe Hicks	102	174	39	.224	6	14
Ed Brinkman	54	133	22	.165	0	4
Gene Woodling	44	107	30	.280	5	16
John Kennedy	14	42	11	.262	1	2
Willie Tasby	11	34	7	.206	0	0
Ron Stillwell	6	22	6	.273	0	2

=== Pitching ===
==== Starting pitchers ====
Note: G = Games pitched; IP = Innings pitched; W = Wins; L = Losses; ERA = Earned run average; SO = Strikeouts

Player	G	IP	W	L	ERA	SO
Dave Stenhouse	34	197.0	11	12	3.65	123
Claude Osteen	28	150.1	8	13	3.65	59
Bob Baird	3	10.2	0	1	6.75	3

==== Other pitchers ====
Note: G = Games pitched; IP = Innings pitched; W = Wins; L = Losses; ERA = Earned run average; SO = Strikeouts

Player	G	IP	W	L	ERA	SO
Don Rudolph	37	176.1	8	10	3.62	68
Tom Cheney	37	173.1	7	9	3.17	147
Bennie Daniels	44	161.1	7	16	4.85	66
Pete Burnside	40	149.2	5	11	4.45	74
Steve Hamilton	41	107.1	3	8	3.77	83
Joe McClain	10	24.0	0	4	9.38	6
Carl Bouldin	6	20.0	1	2	5.85	12
Jack Jenkins	3	13.1	0	1	4.05	10

==== Relief pitchers ====
Note: G = Games pitched; W = Wins; L = Losses; SV = Saves; ERA = Earned run average; SO = Strikeouts

Player	G	W	L	SV	ERA	SO
Jim Hannan	42	2	4	4	3.31	39
Marty Kutyna	54	5	6	0	4.04	25
Ed Hobaugh	26	2	1	1	3.76	37
Ray Rippelmeyer	18	1	2	0	5.49	17
Fred Green	5	0	1	0	6.43	2

== Awards and honors ==
All-Star Game

- Dave Stenhouse, Pitcher, Reserve in first game, Starter in second game

== Farm system ==
Level	Team	League	Manager
AAA	Syracuse Chiefs	International League	Frank Verdi and Johnny Vander Meer
B	Raleigh Capitals	Carolina League	Archie Wilson
D	Pensacola Senators	Alabama–Florida League	Wayne Terwilliger
D	Middlesboro Senators	Appalachian League	Lew Morton

Syracuse affiliation shared with New York Mets
