= List of Texas Rangers Opening Day starting pitchers =

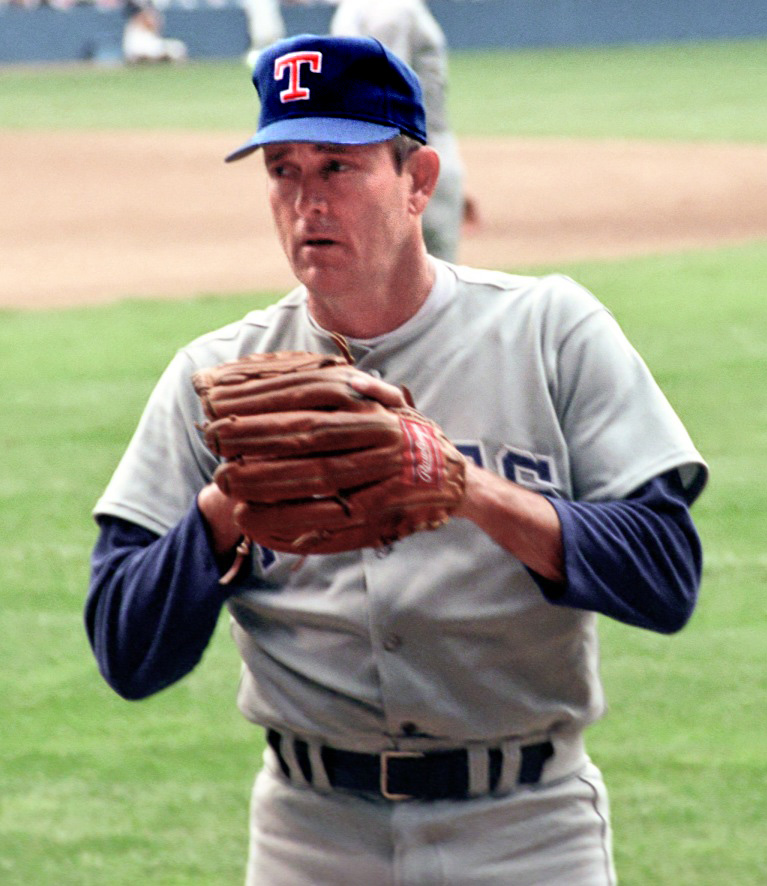
Nolan Ryan, the Rangers' Opening Day starting pitcher in 1990, 1991, and 1992

The Texas Rangers are a Major League Baseball (MLB) team based in Arlington, Texas. They play in the American League West division. From 1961 to 1971, the team played in Washington, D.C., as the Washington Senators, one of three different major league teams to use the name. The franchise relocated to Arlington as the Rangers in 1972. The first game of the new baseball season for a team is played on Opening Day, and being named the Opening Day starting pitcher is an honor which is given to the player who is expected to lead the pitching staff that season, though there are various strategic reasons why a team's best pitcher might not start on Opening Day. The Rangers have used 37 different Opening Day starting pitchers in their 60 seasons.

The Senators' first Opening Day game was played against the Chicago White Sox at Griffith Stadium in Washington, on April 10, 1961. Dick Donovan was their starting pitcher that day; he took the decision in a game the Senators lost, 4–3. In 1962, the team moved to District of Columbia Stadium (renamed Robert F. Kennedy Memorial Stadium in 1969). Opening Day starter Bennie Daniels earned the win in a 4–1 victory over the Detroit Tigers on April 9. Through their 11 years in Washington, the Senators started every Opening Day game at home. Their final Opening Day game in Washington was an 8–0 win over the Oakland Athletics on April 5, 1971, with starter Dick Bosman being credited with the win.

The team moved to Texas in 1972, and played their home games at Arlington Stadium. Their 1972 season opener was played on the road, but they played their first Opening Day game in Arlington on April 7, 1973, with Bosman taking the loss in a 3–1 loss to the White Sox. The Rangers' final Opening Day at Arlington Stadium occurred on April 8, 1991, when starter Nolan Ryan was handed the loss by the Milwaukee Brewers, 5–4. They moved into The Ballpark in Arlington in 1994, but did not host their first Opening Day at new facility until 1996. In the game, starting pitcher Ken Hill got the win in a 5–3 defeat of the Boston Red Sox. The stadium was subsequently renamed Ameriquest Field in Arlington (2004–2006), Rangers Ballpark in Arlington (2007–2013), and Globe Life Park in Arlington (2014–2019). Starter Mike Minor took the loss in Globe Life Park's final Opening Day game against the Chicago Cubs on March 28, 2019, a 12–4 loss. The Rangers played their first Opening Day game at their current ballpark, Globe Life Field, on July 24, 2020. Earning the win was starter Lance Lynn, as Texas beat the Colorado Rockies, 1–0.

The Rangers' Opening Day starting pitchers have a combined Opening Day record of 20 wins, 30 losses and 10 no decisions. In Washington, they had a record of 2 wins and 9 losses in 11 Opening Day starts. In Texas, they have 18 wins, 21 losses, and 10 no decisions in 49 Opening Day starts. They have an aggregate record of 15 wins, 19 losses, and 6 no decisions in 40 Opening Day starts at home. Texas starters have a record of 5 wins, 11 losses, and 4 no decisions in 20 Opening Day starts on the road.

Charlie Hough has the most Opening Day starts for the Rangers, with six, followed by Dick Bosman and Kevin Millwood (4); Jon Matlack, Kenny Rogers, and Nolan Ryan (3); and Cole Hamels, Rick Helling, Ken Hill, Ferguson Jenkins, Camilo Pascual, and Pete Richert (2). Bosman (1970–1973) and Millwood (2006–2009) made four consecutive Opening Day starts. Hough (1987–1989) and Ryan (1990–1992) made three consecutive starts, while Hill (1996–1997), Hough (1984–1985), Matlack (1980–1981), Pascual (1968–1969), and Richert (1966–1967) made back-to-back starts.

Three Texas Rangers Opening Day pitchers—Ferguson Jenkins, Gaylord Perry, and Nolan Ryan—have been inducted into the National Baseball Hall of Fame and Museum.

== Table key ==
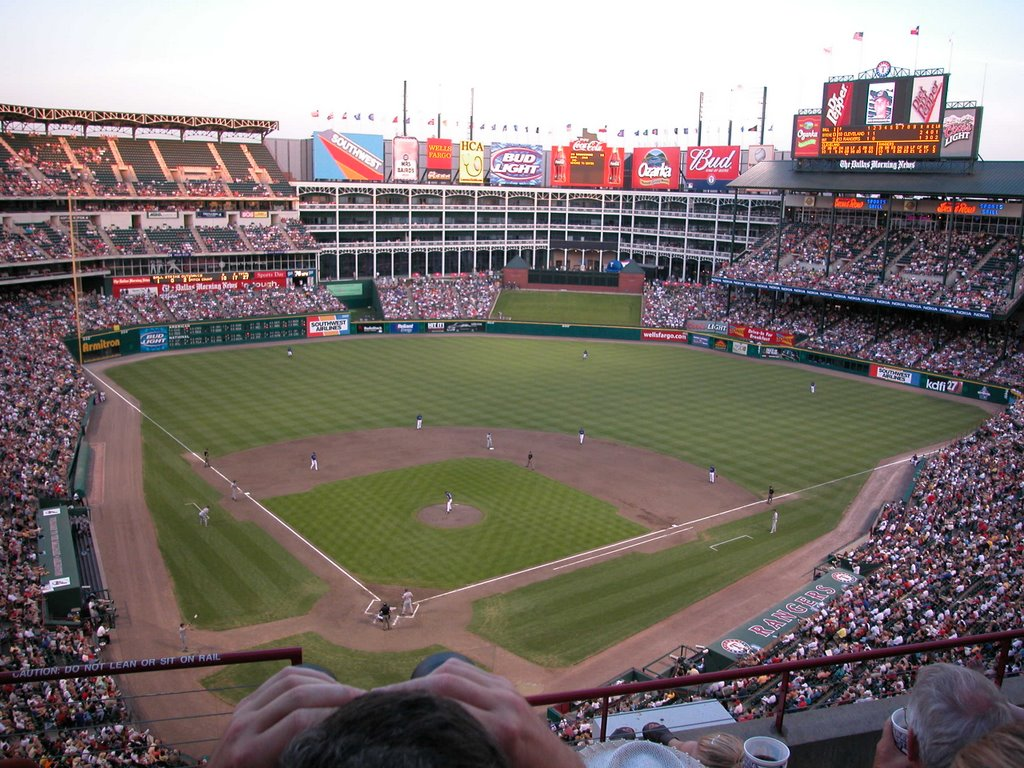
Globe Life Park in Arlington, the team's home stadium from 1994 to 2019

Season	Each year is linked to an article about that particular Senators/Rangers season.
Pitcher (#)	Number indicates multiple appearances as a Rangers Opening Day starter
Score (#)	Game score with Rangers runs listed first; number of innings in a game that was shorter or longer than 9 innings in parentheses
Location	Stadium in italics denotes a Rangers home game
W	Win
L	Loss
ND (W)	No decision by starting pitcher; Rangers won game
ND (L)	No decision by starting pitcher; Rangers lost game
*	Advanced to the postseason
**	Won the American League Championship Series
†	Won the World Series

== Opening Day results ==
Season	Pitcher	Decision	Score	Opponent	Location	Attendance	Ref.
1961	Dick Donovan	L	3–4	Chicago White Sox	Griffith Stadium	26,725	
1962	Bennie Daniels	W	4–1	Detroit Tigers	District of Columbia Stadium	44,383	
1963	Don Rudolph	L	1–3	Baltimore Orioles	District of Columbia Stadium	43,022	
1964	Claude Osteen	L	0–4	Los Angeles Angels	District of Columbia Stadium	40,145	
1965	Phil Ortega	L	2–7	Boston Red Sox	District of Columbia Stadium	43,554	
1966	Pete Richert	L	2–5	Cleveland Indians	District of Columbia Stadium	44,468	
1967	Pete Richert (2)	L	0–8	New York Yankees	District of Columbia Stadium	44,382	
1968	Camilo Pascual	L	0–2	Minnesota Twins	District of Columbia Stadium	32,063	
1969	Camilo Pascual (2)	L	4–8	New York Yankees	Robert F. Kennedy Memorial Stadium	45,113	
1970	Dick Bosman	L	0–5	Detroit Tigers	Robert F. Kennedy Memorial Stadium	45,015	
1971	Dick Bosman (2)	W	8–0	Oakland Athletics	Robert F. Kennedy Memorial Stadium	45,061	
1972	Dick Bosman (3)	L	0–1	California Angels	Anaheim Stadium	13,916	
1973	Dick Bosman (4)	L	1–3	Chicago White Sox	Arlington Stadium	22,114	
1974	Jim Bibby	L	2–7	Oakland Athletics	Arlington Stadium	21,907	
1975	Ferguson Jenkins	L	4–11	Minnesota Twins	Arlington Stadium	28,787	
1976	Gaylord Perry	W	2–1 (11)	Minnesota Twins	Arlington Stadium	28,947	
1977	Bert Blyleven	W	2–1 (10)	Baltimore Orioles	Memorial Stadium	31,307	
1978	Jon Matlack	W	2–1	New York Yankees	Arlington Stadium	40,078	
1979	Ferguson Jenkins (2)	W	8–2	Detroit Tigers	Tiger Stadium	43,708	
1980	Jon Matlack (2)	ND (W)	1–0 (12)	New York Yankees	Arlington Stadium	33,196	
1981	Jon Matlack (3)	L	3–10	New York Yankees	Yankee Stadium	55,123	
1982	Charlie Hough	W	8–3	Cleveland Indians	Cleveland Stadium	62,443	
1983	Mike Smithson	ND (W)	5–3	Chicago White Sox	Arlington Stadium	13,140	
1984	Charlie Hough (2)	L	1–9	Cleveland Indians	Arlington Stadium	21,537	
1985	Charlie Hough (3)	ND (L)	2–4	Baltimore Orioles	Memorial Stadium	50,402	
1986	José Guzmán	W	6–3	Toronto Blue Jays	Arlington Stadium	40,602	
1987	Charlie Hough (4)	ND (L)	1–2	Baltimore Orioles	Memorial Stadium	51,650	
1988	Charlie Hough (5)	W	4–3	Cleveland Indians	Arlington Stadium	37,613	
1989	Charlie Hough (6)	W	4–0	Detroit Tigers	Arlington Stadium	40,375	
1990	Nolan Ryan	W	4–2	Toronto Blue Jays	Arlington Stadium	40,907	
1991	Nolan Ryan (2)	L	4–5	Milwaukee Brewers	Arlington Stadium	40,560	
1992	Nolan Ryan (3)	ND (W)	12–10	Seattle Mariners	Kingdome	55,918	
1993	Craig Lefferts	W	7–4	Baltimore Orioles	Oriole Park at Camden Yards	46,145	
1994	Kevin Brown	L	3–5	New York Yankees	Yankee Stadium	56,706	
1995	Kenny Rogers	L	6–8	New York Yankees	Yankee Stadium	50,525	
1996*	Ken Hill	W	5–3	Boston Red Sox	The Ballpark in Arlington	40,484	
1997	Ken Hill (2)	W	6–2	Milwaukee Brewers	The Ballpark in Arlington	45,098	
1998*	John Burkett	L	2–9	Chicago White Sox	The Ballpark in Arlington	45,909	
1999*	Rick Helling	L	5–11	Detroit Tigers	The Ballpark in Arlington	46,650	
2000	Kenny Rogers (2)	W	10–4	Chicago White Sox	The Ballpark in Arlington	49,332	
2001	Rick Helling (2)	L	1–8	Toronto Blue Jays	Hiram Bithorn Stadium	19,891	
2002	Chan Ho Park	L	3–8	Oakland Athletics	Network Associates Coliseum	43,908	
2003	Ismael Valdez	W	6–3	Anaheim Angels	Angel Stadium of Anaheim	43,525	
2004	Kenny Rogers (3)	ND (L)	4–5	Oakland Athletics	Network Associates Coliseum	45,122	
2005	Ryan Drese	L	2–3	Los Angeles Angels of Anaheim	Angel Stadium of Anaheim	43,590	
2006	Kevin Millwood	L	3–7	Boston Red Sox	Ameriquest Field in Arlington	51,541	
2007	Kevin Millwood (2)	L	1–4	Los Angeles Angels of Anaheim	Angel Stadium of Anaheim	43,906	
2008	Kevin Millwood (3)	L	2–5	Seattle Mariners	Safeco Field	46,334	
2009	Kevin Millwood (4)	W	9–1	Cleveland Indians	Rangers Ballpark in Arlington	49,916	
2010**	Scott Feldman	ND (W)	5–4	Toronto Blue Jays	Rangers Ballpark in Arlington	50,299	
2011**	C. J. Wilson	ND (W)	9–5	Boston Red Sox	Rangers Ballpark in Arlington	50,146	
2012*	Colby Lewis	W	3–2	Chicago White Sox	Rangers Ballpark in Arlington	49,085	
2013	Matt Harrison	L	2–8	Houston Astros	Minute Maid Park	41,307	
2014	Tanner Scheppers	ND (L)	10–14	Philadelphia Phillies	Globe Life Park in Arlington	49,031	
2015*	Yovani Gallardo	L	0–8	Oakland Athletics	O.co Coliseum	36,067	
2016*	Cole Hamels	W	3–2	Seattle Mariners	Globe Life Park in Arlington	49,289	
2017	Yu Darvish	ND (L)	5–8	Cleveland Indians	Globe Life Park in Arlington	48,350	
2018	Cole Hamels (2)	L	1–4	Houston Astros	Globe Life Park in Arlington	47,253	
2019	Mike Minor	L	4–12	Chicago Cubs	Globe Life Park in Arlington	48,538	
2020	Lance Lynn	W	1–0	Colorado Rockies	Globe Life Field	0	
2021	Kyle Gibson	ND (L)	10–14	Kansas City Royals	Kauffman Stadium	9,155	
2022	Jon Gray	ND (L)	8–10	Toronto Blue Jays	Rogers Centre	45,022	
2023†	Jacob deGrom	ND (W)	11–7	Philadelphia Phillies	Globe Life Field	38,387	
2024	Nathan Eovaldi	ND (W)	4–3 (10)	Chicago Cubs	Globe Life Field	42,130	
2025	Nathan Eovaldi (2)	ND (L)	2–5	Boston Red Sox	Globe Life Field	37,587	
2026	Nathan Eovaldi (3)	L	3–6	Philadelphia Phillies	Citizens Bank Park	44,610	

== Pitchers ==
Opening Day starting pitchers are listed in descending order by the number of Opening Day starts for the Senators/Rangers.

Pitcher	Starts	Wins	Losses	No decisions	Win %	Season(s)
Charlie Hough	6	3	1	2	0.750	1982, 1984, 1985, 1987, 1988, 1989
Dick Bosman	4	1	3	0	0.250	1970, 1971, 1972, 1973
Kevin Millwood	4	1	3	0	0.250	2006, 2007, 2008
Nathan Eovaldi	3	0	1	2	0.000	2024, 2025
Jon Matlack	3	1	1	1	0.500	1978, 1980, 1981
Kenny Rogers	3	1	1	1	0.500	1995, 2000, 2004
Nolan Ryan	3	1	1	1	0.500	1990, 1991, 1992
Ken Hill	2	2	0	0	1.000	1996, 1997
Cole Hamels	2	1	1	0	0.500	2016, 2018
Ferguson Jenkins	2	1	1	0	0.500	1975, 1979
Rick Helling	2	0	2	0	0.000	1999, 2001
Camilo Pascual	2	0	2	0	0.000	1968, 1969
Pete Richert	2	0	2	0	0.000	1966, 1967
Bert Blyleven	1	1	0	0	1.000	1977
Bennie Daniels	1	1	0	0	1.000	1962
José Guzmán	1	1	0	0	1.000	1986
Craig Lefferts	1	1	0	0	1.000	1993
Colby Lewis	1	1	0	0	1.000	2012
Lance Lynn	1	1	0	0	1.000	2020
Gaylord Perry	1	1	0	0	1.000	1976
Ismael Valdez	1	1	0	0	1.000	2003
Jim Bibby	1	0	1	0	0.000	1974
Kevin Brown	1	0	1	0	0.000	1994
John Burkett	1	0	1	0	0.000	1997
Yu Darvish	1	0	0	1	0.000	2017
Ryan Drese	1	0	1	0	0.000	2005
Dick Donovan	1	0	1	0	0.000	1961
Scott Feldman	1	0	0	1	0.000	2010
Yovani Gallardo	1	0	1	0	0.000	2015
Matt Harrison	1	0	1	0	0.000	2013
Mike Minor	1	0	1	0	0.000	2019
Phil Ortega	1	0	1	0	0.000	1965
Claude Osteen	1	0	1	0	0.000	1964
Chan Ho Park	1	0	1	0	0.000	2002
Don Rudolph	1	0	1	0	0.000	1963
Jacob deGrom	1	0	0	1	0.000	2023
Kyle Gibson	1	0	0	1	0.000	2021
Jon Gray	1	0	0	1	0.000	2022
Tanner Scheppers	1	0	0	1	0.000	2014
Mike Smithson	1	0	0	1	0.000	1983
C. J. Wilson	1	0	0	1	0.000	2011
