= 1960 Major League Baseball expansion draft =

Selection of players by the Angles and Senators

General information
- Sport: Baseball
- Date: December 14, 1960
- Location: Boston, Massachusetts

Overview
- 61 total selections
- League: American League (Note: This draft was limited to American League teams; while the American League and National League are commonly referred to collectively as Major League Baseball, across many decades, Major League Baseball has only existed as a legal entity since 2000.)
- Expansion teams: Los Angeles Angels; Washington Senators
- Expansion season: 1961
- First selection: Eli Grba (Los Angeles Angels)

The 1960 Major League Baseball expansion draft was held by Major League Baseball on December 14, 1960, to fill the rosters of the Los Angeles Angels and the Washington Senators. (Note: The Washington Senators competed in the American League through the 1971 season, then relocated to the Dallas–Fort Worth metroplex and were renamed the Texas Rangers.)

The Angels and Senators were new franchises due to enter the American League (AL) the following season as part of the 1961 Major League Baseball expansion. The Angels became the AL's first team to be based on the West Coast of the United States, while the Senators took the place of the league's original Washington Senators franchise, which had moved to Minneapolis–Saint Paul as the Minnesota Twins after the 1960 season.

The draft, held in Boston, site of AL headquarters, had been scheduled for Tuesday, December 13, 1960, but had to be postponed one day due to a heavy snowstorm that struck the New England region.

== Ground rules ==
As with all major-league expansion drafts prior to 1992, only players from the admitting league were eligible for selection. Each existing American League club had to make available for the draft seven players on their active rosters on August 31, 1960, and eight others from their 40-man rosters. The expansion clubs paid $75,000 ($816,226 in 2025) for each of 28 players they drafted with a maximum of seven players drafted from each existing club, not including minor-league selections. They were required to take at least ten pitchers, two catchers, six infielders, and four outfielders. The clubs also had the option of drafting one non-roster player for $25,000 ($272,075 in 2025) from each established franchise.

== Hasty expansion sowed draft confusion ==
1961 American League expansion teams

Reacting belatedly to the National League's July 1960 announcement that it would expand to New York and Houston to begin play in April 1962 (twenty months later), the American League suddenly declared in October 1960 it would add two new teams as well—and that the AL's expansion teams would take the field in only six months, in time for the 1961 season.

Playing catch-up to the National League, under a much tighter deadline with no ownership groups, management or stadia yet in place, the American League was forced to wait until November 17, 1960, to officially award an expansion franchise to Washington, D.C., to replace the recently relocated Twins. Because it also intended to enter the Los Angeles metropolitan market, then controlled by Walter O'Malley, principal owner of the Dodgers, the American League was compelled to negotiate an indemnification agreement with O'Malley before the Los Angeles franchise could be granted. Finally, on December 6, 1960—one week before the expansion draft was expected to be held—the Angels franchise was officially created and awarded to a group led by Gene Autry.

Because the new teams had not had the time to assemble a scouting department, they were forced to lean on scouting reports from National League franchises to select their full complement of new players. The Angels were aided by the San Francisco Giants, and the Senators by the Pittsburgh Pirates. The league's chaotic, eleventh-hour approach to expansion resulted, on the day of the draft, in the new teams' noncompliance with rules that governed the maximum number of players each new club could select from each of the eight established teams. As a result, several post-draft trades, ordered by American League president Joe Cronin, were necessary to rectify the problem.

== Results ==
Key
‡	All-Star

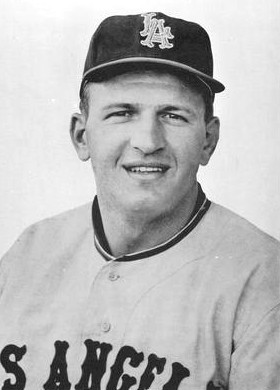
Eli Grba, selected by the Los Angeles Angels, was the first overall pick.

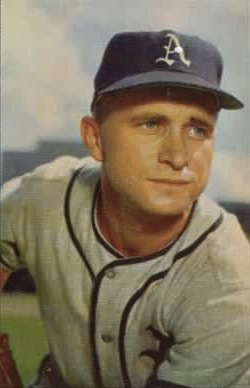
Bobby Shantz, the second overall selection, was the top pick of the Washington Senators.

Pick	Player	Position	Selected from	Selected by
1	Eli Grba	Pitcher	New York Yankees	Los Angeles Angels
2	Bobby Shantz^{‡}	Pitcher	New York Yankees	Washington Senators
3	Duke Maas	Pitcher	New York Yankees	Los Angeles Angels
4	Dave Sisler	Pitcher	Detroit Tigers	Washington Senators
5	Jerry Casale	Pitcher	Boston Red Sox	Los Angeles Angels
6	Johnny Klippstein	Pitcher	Cleveland Indians	Washington Senators
7	Tex Clevenger	Pitcher	Minnesota Twins	Los Angeles Angels
8	Pete Burnside	Pitcher	Detroit Tigers	Washington Senators
9	Bob Sprout	Pitcher	Detroit Tigers	Los Angeles Angels
10	Carl Mathias	Pitcher	Cleveland Indians	Washington Senators
11	Aubrey Gatewood	Pitcher	Detroit Tigers	Los Angeles Angels
12	Ed Hobaugh	Pitcher	Chicago White Sox	Washington Senators
13	Ken McBride^{‡}	Pitcher	Chicago White Sox	Los Angeles Angels
14	Hal Woodeshick^{‡}	Pitcher	Minnesota Twins	Washington Senators
15	Ned Garver^{‡}	Pitcher	Kansas City Athletics	Los Angeles Angels
16	Tom Sturdivant	Pitcher	Boston Red Sox	Washington Senators
17	Ron Moeller	Pitcher	Baltimore Orioles	Los Angeles Angels
18	Héctor Maestri	Pitcher	Minnesota Twins	Washington Senators
19	Bob Davis	Pitcher	Kansas City Athletics	Los Angeles Angels
20	Rudy Hernández	Pitcher	Minnesota Twins	Washington Senators
21	Ed Sadowski	Catcher	Boston Red Sox	Los Angeles Angels
22	Pete Daley	Catcher	Kansas City Athletics	Washington Senators
23	Buck Rodgers	Catcher	Detroit Tigers	Los Angeles Angels
24	Dutch Dotterer	Catcher	Kansas City Athletics	Washington Senators
25	Eddie Yost^{‡}	Third baseman	Detroit Tigers	Los Angeles Angels
26	Coot Veal	Shortstop	Detroit Tigers	Washington Senators
27	Ken Aspromonte	Second baseman	Cleveland Indians	Los Angeles Angels
28	Dale Long^{‡}	First baseman	New York Yankees	Washington Senators
29	Ken Hamlin	Shortstop	Kansas City Athletics	Los Angeles Angels
30	Jim Mahoney	Shortstop	Boston Red Sox	Washington Senators
31	Gene Leek	Third baseman	Cleveland Indians	Los Angeles Angels
32	Bob Johnson	Shortstop	Kansas City Athletics	Washington Senators
33	Jim Fregosi^{‡}	Shortstop	Boston Red Sox	Los Angeles Angels
34	Billy Klaus	Second baseman	Baltimore Orioles	Washington Senators
35	Bob Cerv^{‡}	First baseman/Outfielder	New York Yankees	Los Angeles Angels
36	Johnny Schaive	Second baseman	Minnesota Twins	Washington Senators
37	Ken Hunt	Outfielder	New York Yankees	Los Angeles Angels
38	Willie Tasby	Outfielder	Boston Red Sox	Washington Senators
39	Jim McAnany	Outfielder	Chicago White Sox	Los Angeles Angels
40	Gene Woodling^{‡}	Outfielder	Baltimore Orioles	Washington Senators
41	Earl Averill Jr.	Outfielder/Catcher	Chicago White Sox	Los Angeles Angels
42	Marty Keough	Outfielder	Cleveland Indians	Washington Senators
43	Faye Throneberry	Outfielder	Minnesota Twins	Los Angeles Angels
44	Chuck Hinton^{‡}	Outfielder	Baltimore Orioles	Washington Senators
45	Ted Kluszewski^{‡}	First baseman	Chicago White Sox	Los Angeles Angels
46	Gene Green	Catcher	Baltimore Orioles	Washington Senators
47	Donald Ross (Note: Donald Ross selected by the Angels, born in 1938, only played in the minor leagues and should not be confused with Don Ross (1914–1996) who played in the major leagues between 1938 and 1946.)	Infielder	Baltimore Orioles	Los Angeles Angels
48	Bud Zipfel	First baseman	New York Yankees	Washington Senators
49	Julio Bécquer	First baseman	Minnesota Twins	Los Angeles Angels
50	Jim King	Outfielder	Cleveland Indians	Washington Senators
51	Dean Chance^{‡}	Pitcher	Baltimore Orioles	Los Angeles Angels
52	Joe Hicks	Outfielder	Chicago White Sox	Washington Senators
53	Fred Newman	Pitcher	Boston Red Sox	Los Angeles Angels
54	Chet Boak	Second baseman	Kansas City Athletics	Washington Senators
55	Red Wilson	Catcher	Cleveland Indians	Los Angeles Angels
56	Dick Donovan^{‡}	Pitcher	Chicago White Sox	Washington Senators
57	Steve Bilko	First baseman	Detroit Tigers	Los Angeles Angels
58	Leo Burke	Third baseman	Baltimore Orioles	Washington Senators
59	Albie Pearson^{‡}	Outfielder	Baltimore Orioles	Los Angeles Angels
60	Haywood Sullivan	Catcher	Boston Red Sox	Washington Senators
61	Joe McClain	Pitcher	Minnesota Twins	Washington Senators

== See also ==
- Continental League, a proposed third major league that had planned to begin play in the 1961 season
