= Bennie Daniels =

American baseball player (born 1932)

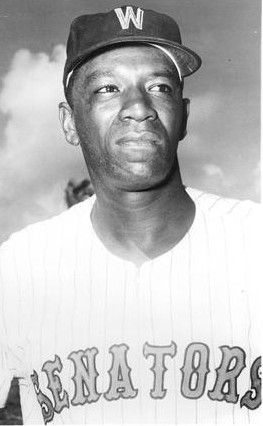
- Pitcher
- Born: June 17, 1932 (age 94); Tuscaloosa, Alabama, U.S.
- Batted: Left Threw: Right

MLB debut
- September 24, 1957, for the Pittsburgh Pirates

Last MLB appearance
- September 18, 1965, for the Washington Senators

MLB statistics
- Win–loss record: 45–76
- Earned run average: 4.44
- Strikeouts: 471
- Stats at Baseball Reference

Teams
- Pittsburgh Pirates (1957–1960); Washington Senators (1961–1965)

Bennie Daniels Jr. (born June 17, 1932), is an American former professional baseball pitcher, who played in Major League Baseball (MLB) for the Pittsburgh Pirates (1957–1960) and Washington Senators (1961–1965). During his playing days, Daniels stood 6 feet 2 inches (1.88 m), weighing 193 pounds (88 kg). He threw right-handed and batted left-handed. During his nine-year big league career, Daniels appeared in 230 games pitched, with 139 starts, and compiled 45 wins, 471 strikeouts, five complete games, five shutouts and five saves, and a 4.44 earned run average (ERA). He allowed 1,004 hits and 383 bases on balls in 997 innings pitched.

Born in Tuscaloosa, Alabama, Daniels graduated from Compton High School in Southern California. He began his career in the Pirates' organization in 1951 with the Great Falls Electrics of the Pioneer League. After spending the 1953–1954 seasons in military service, he continued to move up through Pittsburgh's farm system. After a good 17–8 season with the Hollywood Stars of the Pacific Coast League, the Bucs called Daniels up in September 1957.

Daniels enjoyed the distinction of starting the last game played in Ebbets Field by the Brooklyn Dodgers, on September 24, 1957. The Pirates were defeated by the Dodgers’ Danny McDevitt, 2–0.

On May 23, 1960, at Forbes Field, Daniels' single in the second inning against Sandy Koufax was the only hit the Pirates got against Koufax, who won 1–0, denying the future Hall-of-Famer what would have been the first of five no-hitters.

On December 16, 1960, Daniels was involved in one of the first trades made by the expansion Washington Senators, set to enter the American League the following April. The four-player deal sent veteran southpaw pitcher Bobby Shantz to the Pirates for Daniels and two others, infielders Harry Bright and R. C. Stevens. Daniels led the 1961 Senators' pitching staff in games won (12), complete games (11), strikeouts (110), and innings pitched (212, tied with Joe McClain). The following year, manager Mickey Vernon selected Daniels to start the 1962 Presidential Opener on April 9—the first one played at the new DC Stadium. He went the distance and defeated the Detroit Tigers, 4–1, allowing only five hits. He pitched for Washington through 1965, going 37–60 (4.14 ERA) in 177 games for the perennial second-division club. He retired from baseball after the 1966 season, which he spent with the Triple-A Hawaii Islanders.

== Later life ==
After retiring from baseball, Daniels returned to Compton, California, with his wife, Jimmie Sue Daniels. He has two children, Michael and Vickie Daniels. Bennie Daniels’ daughter, Vickie died, in September 2017. He currently resides in Compton.
