= Rick Helling =

American baseball player (born 1970)

- Pitcher
- Born: December 15, 1970 (age 55); Devils Lake, North Dakota, U.S.
- Batted: Right Threw: Right

MLB debut
- April 10, 1994, for the Texas Rangers

Last MLB appearance
- September 9, 2006, for the Milwaukee Brewers

MLB statistics
- Win–loss record: 93–81
- Earned run average: 4.68
- Strikeouts: 1,058
- Stats at Baseball Reference

Teams
- Texas Rangers (1994–1996); Florida Marlins (1996–1997); Texas Rangers (1997–2001); Arizona Diamondbacks (2002); Baltimore Orioles (2003); Florida Marlins (2003); Milwaukee Brewers (2005–2006)

Career highlights and awards
- World Series champion (2003); AL wins leader (1998)
Medals
Men's baseball
Representing United States
Pan American Games
Bronze medal – third place	1991 Havana	Team

Ricky Allen Helling (born December 15, 1970) is an American former Major League Baseball pitcher.

== Early life and college ==
Helling attended Lakota High School in Lakota, North Dakota for three years, before graduating from Shanley High School in Fargo, North Dakota. He was a letterman in football, basketball, and baseball. In football, he was a three-time All-Conference honoree. In basketball, he led the state in scoring.

Helling accepted a scholarship to play college football at North Dakota but redshirted as a freshman and transferred to Kishwaukee College during his first semester in order to play college baseball. He performed well enough at Kishwaukee to earn a baseball scholarship to Stanford University. While at Stanford he joined Delta Tau Delta International Fraternity. He was selected by the Texas Rangers in the 1st round of the 1992 Major League Baseball draft.

Writer Chuck Klosterman describes Rick Helling as his personal archenemy.

== Baseball career ==
Helling was an early critic of performance-enhancing drugs in Major League Baseball, warning the Players Union as early as 1998 that drugs were a problem in the sport; he served as a Union Executive Board Member from 1999 to 2007.

Helling was a member of two World Series Championship teams: the 1997 World Series Champion Florida Marlins and the 2003 World Series Champion Florida Marlins. Despite being traded to the Texas Rangers earlier in the 1997 season, which meant he did not participate in the Marlins' World Series win that year, he was awarded a World Series ring by his former teammates because of his half-season contribution.

On August 13, 1996, Helling pitched a perfect game while with the Rangers' Triple-A Oklahoma City 89ers against the Nashville Sounds. He struck out four batters in the nine-inning game.

In 1998 he won five straight games on the road; no Texas pitcher matched that accomplishment until Scott Feldman surpassed it in 2009. Helling had his best season in 1998 going 20–7, tying for the American League lead in wins with David Cone and Roger Clemens. His 11 road victories in 1998 set a club record, later matched by Vicente Padilla (2008) and surpassed by Feldman (2009).

In 1999, Helling started 35 games for the Rangers, going 13-11 while leading the majors with 41 home runs allowed.

In 2000, Helling broke a 30-year-old record by giving up 66 doubles. One year later, he broke his record by allowing 68 doubles.

In 2001, Helling led the majors in hits allowed (256), earned runs (124) and home runs allowed (38).

Helling signed a one-year deal with the Diamondbacks in 2002. In his lone season with Arizona, Helling went 10–12 in 30 starts. After the season, Helling signed with the Baltimore Orioles.

Helling spent half the season in Baltimore before being traded back to the Florida Marlins.

Helling did not pitch in 2004 due to injury. On June 20, 2006, Helling struck out three batters on nine pitches—Curtis Granderson, Plácido Polanco and Iván Rodríguez—in the first inning of a 10–1 loss to the Detroit Tigers, thereby becoming the 38th pitcher in major league history to throw an immaculate inning.

On February 5, 2007, he announced his retirement to spend more time with his family.

== Post-baseball life ==
On March 17, 2009, he was hired as a special assistant to the head of the Major League Baseball Players Association, Donald Fehr.

He currently resides in Minneapolis–Saint Paul. He also coaches football at Minnetonka High School. Notable former players include K'Andre Miller of the New York Rangers in the NHL. K'Andre considers Helling as a mentor.

== See also ==
- List of Major League Baseball annual wins leaders
- List of Texas Rangers Opening Day starting pitchers
