= Bud Zipfel =

American baseball player (1938–2026)

- First baseman
- Born: November 18, 1938; Belleville, Illinois, U.S.
- Died: October 10, 2026 (aged 87); Highland, Illinois, U.S.
- Batted: Left Threw: Right

MLB debut
- July 26, 1961, for the Washington Senators

Last MLB appearance
- September 30, 1962, for the Washington Senators

MLB statistics
- Batting average: .220
- Home runs: 10
- Runs batted in: 31
- Stats at Baseball Reference

Teams
- Washington Senators (1961–1962)

Marion Sylvester "Bud" Zipfel (November 18, 1938 – October 10, 2026) was an American professional baseball player who appeared in 118 games over two seasons in Major League Baseball (MLB) for the 1961–1962 Washington Senators. Born in Belleville, Illinois, he was a first baseman and left fielder who batted left-handed, threw right-handed, stood 6 feet 3 inches (1.91 m) tall and weighed 200 pounds (91 kg).

== Baseball career ==
After graduating from Belleville High School in 1956, Zipfel signed with the New York Yankees. He steadily progressed through the Yankees' minor league system over the next five years, showing some potential as a powerful, left-handed-hitting first baseman. He exceeded the 20-homer mark twice, in the Class D New York–Penn League (21 in 1958) and the Class A Eastern League (28 in 1960).

On December 14, 1960, Zipfel was chosen by the Los Angeles Angels in the 29th round of the 1960 Major League Baseball expansion draft and was then immediately traded to the expansion edition of the Senators for infielder Ken Hamlin. Zipfel had an "impressive" spring training with the Senators in 1961 and, after continuing his powerful hitting in the minor leagues–he had his best statistical season in 1961 playing for the Syracuse Chiefs, batting .312 with 18 home runs over 101 games–Zipfel made his MLB debut with Washington on July 26, 1961. He remained on the big league squad for the rest of the season as a backup first baseman, but hit just .200 with only four home runs over 50 games.

Zipfel was drafted into the United States Marine Corps soon after the 1961 baseball season but completed his service in time to rejoin the Senators at the end of spring training in 1962. He began the season in the minor leagues and was recalled to the major league squad on June 26, 1962. Zipfel remained with the Senators for the rest of the season, splitting time between first base and left field. He again struggled to hit major league pitching, batting .239 with six home runs over 68 games. The highlight of his season was a 16th inning home run (the last of his major league career) that provided the winning margin in a game in which teammate Tom Cheney struck out a record 21 batters in a 228 pitch complete game on September 12.

The Senators sold Zipfel's contract to the Cincinnati Reds at the end of the 1962 season. For the next four years, he played for minor league affiliates of the Reds, Detroit Tigers, Philadelphia Phillies, and St. Louis Cardinals. After not being recalled to the major leagues during that span, he retired from baseball after the 1966 season.

== Later life and death ==
After retirement, Zipfel pursued a career as a salesman and entrepreneur, as he owned and operated an insurance and real estate business for more than 50 years in his hometown Belleville.

His name graced the title of the 1985 book Aaron to Zipfel by Richard Marazzi and Len Fiorito, a collection of biographies of every MLB player from the 1960s.

Zipfel died on October 10, 2026, at the age of 87.
