= Carl Mathias =

American baseball player (born 1936)

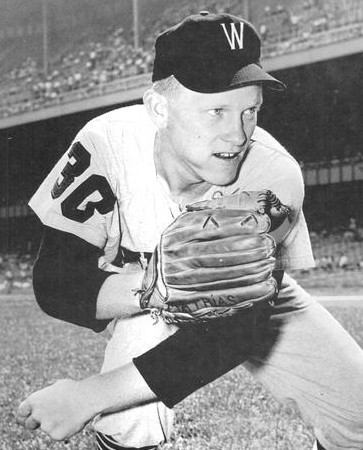
- Pitcher
- Born: June 13, 1936 (age 90); Bechtelsville, Pennsylvania
- Batted: Switch Threw: Left

MLB debut
- July 31, 1960, for the Cleveland Indians

Last MLB appearance
- July 14, 1961, for the Washington Senators

MLB statistics
- Win–loss record: 0–2
- Earned run average: 7.14
- Strikeouts: 20
- Stats at Baseball Reference

Teams
- Cleveland Indians (1960); Washington Senators (1961)

Carl Lynwood Mathias (born June 13, 1936) is an American former professional baseball player, a left-handed pitcher who appeared in 11 games over parts of two seasons for the Cleveland Indians (1960) and Washington Senators (1961). The native of Bechtelsville, Pennsylvania, was nicked "Stubby", although he was listed as 5 feet 11 inches (1.80 m) tall during his playing career; he weighed 195 pounds (88 kg).

Mathias signed with Cleveland in 1955 after graduating from Oley Valley High School. The Indians recalled him from Triple-A in the midseason of 1960, and used him in seven games, all in relief, with Mathias posting an 0–1 won–lost record, with no saves, through September 26. Then, in December, he was selected by the newly created expansion edition of the Washington Senators with the tenth overall pick in the 1960 Major League Baseball expansion draft. Mathias appeared in four games for the 1961 Senators in midyear after being called up from Triple-A, starting in three of them.

His first start, on June 18, against the Boston Red Sox at Fenway Park, was especially memorable. He pitched into the ninth inning, and left the game with Washington ahead 12–7 and two outs, although Mathias had left the bases loaded. His relief pitcher, Dave Sisler, proceeded to issue a pair of bases on balls to score two Boston runs, then surrendered a walk-off grand slam home run to Jim Pagliaroni, giving the Bosox a 13–12 win. Mathias did not get a decision, but lost the opportunity to register his first MLB win. Mathias was treated rudely by the Chicago White Sox in his next start June 24 and took the loss, the second of his career. He made two more appearances before returning to the minor leagues for the remainder of his pro career. He retired in 1964 after ten seasons.

In his 11 MLB games with three career starts, covering 29 innings pitched, Mathias fashioned an 0–2 record, no saves, and an earned run average of 7.14. He permitted 23 earned runs, 36 hits and 12 bases on balls, and registered 20 strikeouts.
