= Gene Green (baseball) =

American baseball player (1933–1981)

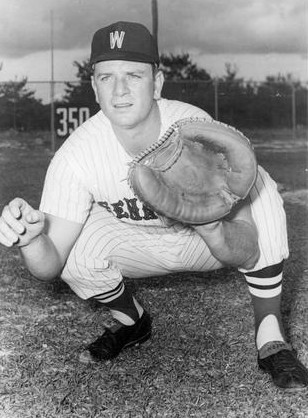
- Outfielder / Catcher
- Born: June 26, 1933; Los Angeles, California, U.S.
- Died: May 23, 1981 (aged 47); St. Louis, Missouri, U.S.
- Batted: Right Threw: Right

MLB debut
- September 10, 1957, for the St. Louis Cardinals

Last MLB appearance
- September 29, 1963, for the Cincinnati Reds

MLB statistics
- Batting average: .267
- Home runs: 46
- Runs batted in: 160
- Stats at Baseball Reference

Teams
- St. Louis Cardinals (1957–1959); Baltimore Orioles (1960); Washington Senators (1961); Cleveland Indians (1962–1963); Cincinnati Reds (1963)

Gene Leroy Green (June 26, 1933 – May 23, 1981) was an American Major League Baseball outfielder and catcher who played all or portions of seven MLB seasons for the St. Louis Cardinals (1957–1959), Baltimore Orioles (1960), Washington Senators (1961), Cleveland Indians (1962–1963) and Cincinnati Reds (1963). A right-handed batter and thrower, he stood 6 feet 2 inches (1.88 m) tall and weighed 200 pounds (91 kg).

== MLB career ==
Born in Los Angeles, Green was signed by the Cardinals in 1952. He spent six full years in the Redbird farm system, hitting over 20 home runs four times, before his recall to St. Louis in September 1957. He then spent all of the 1958 season on the Cardinal roster, setting career bests in games played (137), hits (124), and batting average (.281), starting 71 games in right field and 48 as catcher. However, he struggled in 1959: he got into only 30 games for St. Louis, spent the heart of that season in the minor leagues, and was traded to the Orioles in December. Baltimore kept him at Triple-A for the full 1960 campaign, except for a September call-up and one game as the Orioles' starting right fielder on September 23.

But the American League was adding two new teams for 1961, including an expansion edition of the Washington Senators, creating an opportunity for Green to regain a big-league job. He was the new Senators' 23rd selection (46th overall) in the expansion draft, then led the 1961 club in home runs (18), a personal best, and slugging percentage (.489). He started 75 games at catcher and 21 more in right field. His 62 runs batted in, also a career high, were one fewer than team leader Willie Tasby's 63.

With Washington seeking to improve its ninth-place roster, he was traded to the Indians on October 5, only four days after the end of the regular season; in the deal, Green, veteran pitcher Dick Donovan (the AL earned run average champion), and backup infielder Jim Mahoney were exchanged for colorful centerfielder Jimmy Piersall. In a utility and pinch hitting role for the 1962 Indians, Green hit 11 home runs in just 143 at bats — one for every 13 ABs — and equalled his 1958 batting mark of .281. The following year, however, he struggled to get untracked in Cleveland; batting only .205 with two homers in 78 at bats on August 1, Green was traded to the Reds for catcher Sammy Taylor, and he hit .226 in limited service in what would be his last year in the majors. Green spent 1964 in the minors before leaving the professional game completely.

Gene Green died in St. Louis, Missouri, at the age of 47.

== Statistical overview ==
Green was below-average defensively in the outfield (.963) and adequate at catcher. He was often used as a pinch hitter during his career. His career totals include 408 games played, 307 hits, 46 home runs, 160 RBI, a .441 slugging percentage, and a lifetime betting average of .267. Career highlights include one four-hit game — two doubles and two singles against the Philadelphia Phillies (June 8, 1958), 13 three-hit games, with the most impressive being two home runs and a single, good for five runs batted in vs. the Indians (June 27, 1961), and two home runs against his old team, the Senators, good for four RBI (August 12, 1962).
