= Dutch Dotterer =

American baseball player (1931–1999)

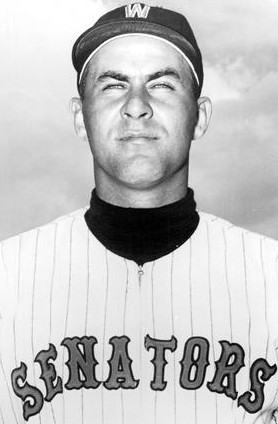
- Catcher
- Born: November 11, 1931; Syracuse, New York, U.S.
- Died: October 9, 1999 (aged 67); Syracuse, New York, U.S.
- Batted: Right Threw: Right

MLB debut
- September 25, 1957, for the Cincinnati Redlegs

Last MLB appearance
- April 30, 1961, for the Washington Senators

MLB statistics
- Batting average: .247
- Home runs: 5
- Runs batted in: 33
- Stats at Baseball Reference

Teams
- Cincinnati Redlegs/Reds (1957–1960); Washington Senators (1961)

Henry John "Dutch" Dotterer Jr. (November 11, 1931 – October 9, 1999) was an American professional baseball catcher who appeared in all or part of five seasons in Major League Baseball for the Cincinnati Redlegs/Reds (1957–1960) and the expansion Washington Senators (1961). A native of Syracuse, New York, he attended Syracuse University and while there was a member of Delta Kappa Epsilon fraternity (Phi Gamma).

== Baseball career ==
Dotterer threw and batted right-handed, stood 6 feet (1.8 m) tall and weighed 209 pounds (95 kg). After his pro career began in 1950, he played six full years in the minor leagues and spent two years in military service before his MLB debut in September 1957. In 107 MLB games, Dotterer batted .247, with 74 hits—including 15 doubles and five home runs—and 33 runs batted in.

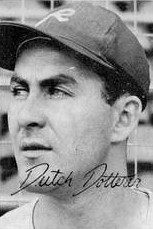
Dotterer in 1958

In 1959, Dotterer backed up regular Cincinnati catcher Ed Bailey, hitting .267 with two homers and 17 RBI in 161 at-bats. At the close of the 1960 season, he was traded to the Kansas City Athletics, who then left him unprotected in the 1960 Major League Baseball expansion draft, where he was acquired by Washington with the 12th pick in the player lottery.

Dotterer was one of six players to hit a grand slam off Sandy Koufax and the only player to twice beat Warren Spahn, another Hall of Fame left-handed pitcher, with extra-inning pinch hits. His grand slam against Koufax, struck June 10, 1960, at the Los Angeles Memorial Coliseum, provided all the Reds' runs in a 4-3 win.

Dotterer made the 1961 Opening Day maiden roster of the Senators and logged 19 at-bats with them, but on April 30 of that season he played his final MLB game, after which he spent the rest of his pro career with his hometown Syracuse Chiefs of the Triple-A International League in 1961–1962. He died in Syracuse at age 67.

== Family ==
His father, Dutch Dotterer Sr., was a minor-league shortstop who became a longtime scout for Cincinnati, the Cleveland Indians and New York Yankees. His brother, Tom, an infielder, played minor league baseball in the Cincinnati organization. His son, Mike, graduated from Stanford University, where he is a member of the Stanford Athletics Hall of Fame in both football and baseball. Mike was drafted by the New York Yankees (1979, 1983), the Oakland Athletics (1982) and in the NFL by the Los Angeles Raiders (1983), where he was a member of the 1984 Super Bowl Championship Team.

== See also ==
- 1960 Major League Baseball expansion draft
