= Chet Boak =

American baseball player (1935–1983)

- Second baseman
- Born: June 19, 1935; New Castle, Pennsylvania, U.S.
- Died: November 28, 1983 (aged 48); Emporium, Pennsylvania, U.S.
- Batted: Right Threw: Right

MLB debut
- September 18, 1960, for the Kansas City Athletics

Last MLB appearance
- May 4, 1961, for the Washington Senators

MLB statistics
- Batting average: .100
- Hits: 2
- Stolen bases: 1
- Stats at Baseball Reference

Teams
- Kansas City Athletics (1960); Washington Senators (1961)

Chester Robert Boak (June 19, 1935 – November 28, 1983) was an American professional baseball player who appeared in ten Major League Baseball games over two seasons—five contests for the 1960 Kansas City Athletics and five more for the 1961 expansion Washington Senators. A second baseman, he threw and batted right-handed and was listed at 6 feet (1.8 m) tall and 180 pounds (82 kg).

== Biography ==
Boak was born in New Castle, Pennsylvania. His pro career lasted for eight total seasons (1955–1957; 1960–1964). In 1960, after compiling 96 runs batted in in the Double-A Southern Association and being named all-star second-baseman, Boak was recalled by the Athletics in September. He started four games at second base, and collected two hits (both of them singles) in 13 at bats. He then was selected by the Senators with the 54th pick in the 1960 Major League Baseball expansion draft, and went hitless in seven at bats for them during the opening weeks of the 1961 season.

He appeared in 891 minor-league games over his career and batted .280 lifetime.
