= Rudy Hernández (pitcher) =

Dominican baseball player (1931–2022)

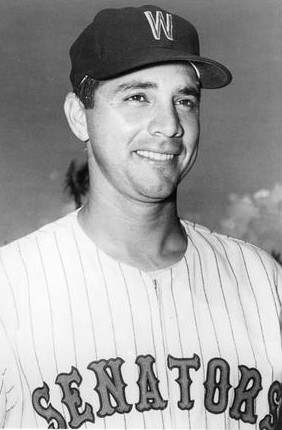
- Hernández in 1961
- Pitcher
- Born: December 10, 1931; Santiago de los Caballeros, Dominican Republic
- Died: November 23, 2022 (aged 90); Condado, Puerto Rico
- Batted: Right Threw: Right

MLB debut
- July 3, 1960, for the Washington Senators

Last MLB appearance
- May 4, 1961, for the Washington Senators

MLB statistics
- Win–loss record: 4–2
- Earned run average: 4.12
- Strikeouts: 26
- Stats at Baseball Reference

Teams
- Washington Senators (1901–1960) (1960); Washington Senators (1961–1971) (1961)

Rudolph Albert Hernández Fuentes (December 10, 1931 – November 23, 2022) was a Dominican Major League Baseball relief pitcher. The 6 ft 3 in (1.91 m), 185 lb (84 kg) right-hander was signed by the New York Giants before the 1950 season. He was acquired by the original, modern-era Washington Senators from the San Francisco Giants before the 1959 season, and later drafted by the new Washington Senators from the Minnesota Twins in the 1960 MLB expansion draft.

When he made his major league debut on July 3, 1960 Hernández became only the fourth native of the Dominican Republic to play in the major leagues, and the first pitcher. He preceded Juan Marichal by sixteen days.

Hernández was one of a small number of ballplayers to play for both of the American League's Washington Senators franchises, and one of only three to play for them in consecutive seasons. (Hal Woodeshick and Héctor Maestri are the others.)

Hernández appeared in twenty-one games for the original Washington club, and also appeared in seven games for the expansion Senators. His two-season career totals were 432/3 innings pitched, 13 games finished, a 4–2 record, and a 4.12 ERA.

His best game occurred on July 9, 1960, when he pitched three scoreless innings of relief to earn a victory against the Baltimore Orioles.

He died in Condado, Puerto Rico on November 23, 2022.
