= Dick Donovan =

American baseball player (1927–1997)

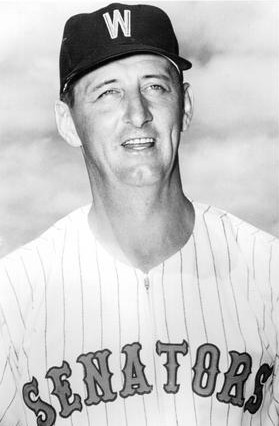
- Donovan in 1961
- Pitcher
- Born: December 7, 1927; Boston, Massachusetts, U.S.
- Died: January 6, 1997 (aged 69); Weymouth, Massachusetts, U.S.
- Batted: Left Threw: Right

MLB debut
- April 24, 1950, for the Boston Braves

Last MLB appearance
- June 12, 1965, for the Cleveland Indians

MLB statistics
- Win–loss record: 122–99
- Earned run average: 3.67
- Strikeouts: 880
- Stats at Baseball Reference

Teams
- Boston Braves (1950–1952); Detroit Tigers (1954); Chicago White Sox (1955–1960); Washington Senators (1961); Cleveland Indians (1962–1965)

Career highlights and awards
- 5× All-Star (1955, 1961–1962²); AL ERA leader (1961)

Richard Edward Donovan (December 7, 1927 – January 6, 1997) was an American Major League Baseball pitcher who played for the Boston Braves (1950–1952), Detroit Tigers (1954), Chicago White Sox (1955–1960), Washington Senators (1961) and Cleveland Indians (1962–1965). He batted left-handed and threw right-handed, stood 6 feet 3 inches (1.91 m) tall and weighed 190 pounds (86 kg).

A Boston native, Donovan graduated from North Quincy High School and served in the United States Navy during and after World War II. Signed by the hometown Braves, he reached the major leagues in 1950 but was used sporadically over the next several years. While pitching for the minor league Atlanta Crackers, he learned how to throw a slider, and this helped him claim a spot in the White Sox' rotation in 1955. He was an All-Star in his first major league season, winning 15 games with only nine losses. In 1956, he led the American League (AL) with a 1.155 walks plus hits per innings pitched. He led the AL with a .727 winning percentage in 1957, going 16–6, and he won 15 games for the White Sox in 1958. He pitched in the 1959 World Series against the Los Angeles Dodgers, losing Game 3 but earning the save in Game 5. Donovan struggled in 1960 and was moved to the bullpen, then got selected in the expansion draft by the Senators after the season. He had his best year with the new club in 1961, leading the AL with a 2.40 earned run average (ERA), though his won-loss record was just 10–10. Traded to the Indians for Jimmy Piersall after the season, he won 20 games his first year with Cleveland. Donovan pitched three more years for the Indians after that before getting released midway through 1965. Following his baseball career, he sold insurance and held other jobs in the Quincy, Massachusetts area before dying of cancer in 1997.

Donovan was unusually good at hitting for a pitcher, homering 15 times in his big-league career.

== Early life ==
Donovan was the youngest of five children of Jeremiah and Gertrude Donovan. He grew up in Boston and attended North Quincy High School, where he played shortstop until his senior year, when he switched positions and became a pitcher. Donovan also pitched for the Catholic Youth Organization. Ken Coleman, broadcaster for the Cleveland Indians, told the story that once, Donovan was invited to pitch for the American Legion All-Star team in an exhibition game. Upon arriving at the park, he was told that he would merely be used in the bullpen. Protesting that he had been promised more, Donovan left the field and went home. "To me, this incident typified the makeup of Dick. He still has the determination to do what he thinks is right, and has the wonderful ability to see the humor in a situation," Coleman said. Donovan's pitching attracted the attention of Boston Braves' scout Jeff Jones, who signed him after his senior year and proclaimed him "the fire-ballingest pitcher” he had seen since spotting Bob Feller pitching in high school. Donovan graduated during World War II, though, and he served three years in the United States Navy before beginning his professional career in 1947.

== Career ==
=== Early years ===
Donovan's career started far south of his home, with the Fort Lauderdale Braves of the Class C Florida International League. He had a 7–15 record and a 4.17 earned run average (ERA) in his first professional season but still got promoted to the Class B Evansville Braves of the Illinois-Indiana-Iowa League. With Evansville in 1948, he had a 12–9 record and a 3.08 ERA. He moved on to the Hartford Chiefs of the Class A Eastern League in 1949, posting a 12–6 record and a 2.66 ERA and earning a promotion to the Class AAA Milwaukee Brewers of the American Association, the Braves' top farm team, for a couple games.

By 1950, Donovan was one of three rookie pitching prospects looking to make it with the Boston Braves, along with Norman Roy and George Uhle, Jr. The Pittsburgh Post-Gazette wrote, "The best of the prospects seems to be Roy, who had a great year in 1949 at Milwaukee." Uhle apparently got hurt (he only appeared in four games in the minors that year and never pitched again), but Roy and Donovan both made the Braves out of spring training, Donovan as a starter. He made his major league debut on April 24, giving up six runs (five earned) in 6 2/3 innings and taking the loss in a 6–4 defeat to the Brooklyn Dodgers. Donovan lost his next start, moved to the bullpen, then went to Milwaukee after appearing in two more games. He was called up in June and in September but spent most of the rest of the year in the minors. In 10 games (three starts) his rookie year, Donovan had an 0–2 record, an 8.19 ERA, nine strikeouts, and 34 walks in 29 2/3 innings. His numbers were not much better at Milwaukee, where in 19 games (10 starts) he had a 3–6 record, a 6.24 ERA, 44 strikeouts, and 33 walks in 75 innings.

In 1951, Donovan started the season with the Braves again but was again moved to the bullpen after two starts. He had a 5.27 ERA (with no record) in eight games with the Braves and did not appear for them after June 5. Spending most of the season with Milwaukee, Donovan had more success with the Brewers in 1951. He had a 7–5 record, a 3.28 ERA, 88 strikeouts, and 59 walks in 129 innings, and he helped the Brewers win the American Association pennant. However, he did not pitch for the Braves in September.

Similarly to his previous two years, Donovan started the season with the Braves, then spent most of the year in Milwaukee, with the exception of a brief call-up in late May to early June. In his only two starts, he gave up six runs in one and was pulled from the game in the other after walking the first three hitters. He had a 5.54 ERA and an 0–2 record with the Braves. With Milwaukee, he appeared in 16 games (12 starts), posting a 4–6 record, a 4.55 ERA, 36 strikeouts, and 43 walks in 91 innings.

Donovan hoped to remain in Milwaukee for the 1953 season, because the Braves moved there from Boston. However, he failed to make the team out of spring training this time, and the Braves tried to send him to their new AAA affiliate, the Toledo Mud Hens. Fearing he would remain in the minor leagues, Donovan requested a trade. “I believed I could win in the major leagues and wanted a chance to prove it," he said. John Quinn denied his request at first, then made him available, but he rejected all deals other teams tried to make for Donovan. Finally, Gene Mauch, Donovan's former roommate and manager of the Braves' Class AA affiliate, convinced Donovan to come play for the Atlanta Crackers of the Southern Association.

"That was the best thing that ever happened to me,” Donovan said of getting sent to Atlanta. “It brought me under the wing of [Whitlow] Wyatt." A former pitcher for the Dodgers, Wyatt taught Donovan how to throw a slider while the prospect was at Atlanta. Donovan appeared in 32 games (19 starts) for Atlanta, posting an 11–8 record, a 3.71 ERA, 132 strikeouts, and 51 walks in 182 innings. He got his wish after the season, when the Braves sold his contract to the Detroit Tigers. Donovan made the Tigers out of spring training but only appeared in two games before Detroit returned him to the Braves on May 13. He was happy to accept another assignment to Atlanta, where Wyatt was now the manager. He responded with his best minor league season yet. In 27 games (all starts) for Atlanta, he had an 18–8 record and a 2.69 ERA for the team. Donovan also managed to hit well for the Crackers, slugging 12 home runs and having 32 runs batted in. The Crackers won the Southern Association pennant, and Donovan was named their Most Valuable Player. After the minor league season, the Chicago White Sox purchased his contract from Milwaukee.

=== Chicago White Sox ===
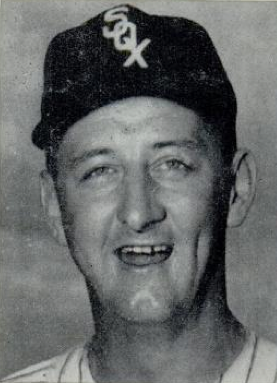
Donovan in 1955

Donovan made the White Sox out of spring training in 1955, as a reliever. However, he was quickly added to the rotation after Bob Keegan, an All-Star who had won 16 games with the White Sox the year before, developed a bone spur on his heel. He finally got his first career win on April 29, in a four-hit shutout of the Boston Red Sox. At the plate, he hit his first career home run July 3 against Hall of Famer Bob Lemon in a 14–9 loss to the Cleveland Indians. With a 10–2 record at the All-Star break, Donovan returned to Milwaukee as a member of the American League (AL) All-Star Team, though he did not pitch in the game. His record was 13–2 on July 20; Donovan lost his next two starts in July, then suffered appendicitis and missed a month recovering. He won his first start back on August 21, then went on a five-game losing streak, posting an 8.07 ERA over that span. In his final start of the year, September 24, he threw a five-hit shutout against the Kansas City Athletics. Donovan finished his first full season in Major League Baseball (MLB) with a 15–9 record, a 3.32 ERA, five shutouts, 88 strikeouts, and 48 walks in 187 innings.

In his first start of the 1956 season April 20, Donovan gave up three runs in 7 2/3 innings and contributed a two-run home run against Lou Kretlow of Kansas City; he got a no-decision, but the White Sox won 5–3. Wins were few and far between for Donovan, who finished July with a 4–7 record and a 5.02 ERA. A six-game winning streak and a 2.01 ERA in the last two months improved his numbers by season's end. When he faced Kansas City on August 15, he limited the Athletics to two hits in a 10–0 shutout. Against Cleveland on August 31, he matched zeroes on the scoreboard with Hall of Famer Early Wynn for nine innings, then won the game in the 10th when his RBI single against Wynn gave the White Sox a 1–0 victory. In 34 games (31 starts), he had a 12–10 record, a 3.64 ERA, three shutouts, 120 strikeouts, and 59 walks in 234 2/3 innings. He led the league with a 1.155 walks plus hits per inning pitched (WHIP).

Donovan threw a shutout against Cleveland on May 25, 1957, allowing a second-inning double to Eddie Robinson that was the only hit for the Indians. He relinquished four runs in his next start against Cleveland on May 30 but had three hits and drove in three runs in a 6–4 victory over the Indians. On July 20, Donovan threw another one-hit shutout in a game against the Red Sox, with Ted Williams's fourth-inning single being the only hit for Boston. Possessing an eight and three record on July 3, he won seven games in a row, a streak that did not end until August 29, in an 11-inning, 2–1 loss to the Yankees. Donovan, as a member of the White Sox, led the 1957 AL in winning percentage, posting a 16–6 record for a .727 winning percentage (tied with Tom Sturdivant, who posted the same numbers with the Yankees). His 16 wins were tied for third in the AL with Sturdivant and Tom Brewer, behind Jim Bunning's and teammate Billy Pierce's 20. He also led the league with 16 complete games and struck out 88 in 220 2/3 innings. Donovan finished 13th in AL Most Valuable Player (MVP) Award voting and came in second to the National League's Warren Spahn in Cy Young Award voting, in an era where the Cy Young was only presented to one pitcher for both leagues.

It looked like Donovan would have the opposite winning percentage in 1958, after he got off to a 3–10 start with an ERA of 4.29. In the midst of the 3–10 start, on June 15, he shut out the Baltimore Orioles in the second game of a doubleheader. The second half of the season was different, as Donovan won 12 of 16 decisions and posted a 2.01 ERA. On August 3, he held the Yankees to one run and singled home a run off of Whitey Ford in a 3–1 victory. He threw back-to-back shutouts against the Tigers August 29 and September 3. In 34 starts, Donovan had a 15–14 record, a 3.01 ERA, four shutouts, 127 strikeouts, and 58 walks in 248 innings. He had the lowest walks per nine innings (1.9) of all AL pitchers and finished 25th in MVP voting.

Donovan was part of the "Go-Go Sox" team that won Chicago's first AL pennant since 1919. After winning his first start in 1959, he went six weeks without winning a game. "There's been nothing wrong with my stride or rhythm," said Donovan. "I just seem more prone to lapses in concentration this year." May 12, he hit a two-run home run against Ike Delock but took a no-decision after running into trouble in the seventh inning; however, the White Sox beat Boston 4–3. A sore shoulder kept him out between July 21 and August 16. In late-August, the White Sox faced Cleveland, a competitive team that trailed them by 1.5 games in the standings, for a four-game series. Donovan took the opportunity to throw his lone shutout of the year, defeating them 2–0 on August 29. The White Sox took a 5.5 game lead after sweeping the Indians, and 10,000 appreciative fans showed up to welcome them back to Midway International Airport when they returned to Chicago. Donovan was 9–6 on September 2 but lost his last four decisions to finish 9–10. He appeared in 31 games (29 starts) for the White Sox, posting a 3.66 ERA and striking out 71 in 179 2/3 innings pitched.

The White Sox faced the Los Angeles Dodgers in the 1959 World Series. Donovan got the start in Game 3 and held the Dodgers to one baserunner through the first six innings. After getting two outs in the seventh, though, he walked Norm Larker and Gil Hodges on nine pitches, prompting manager Al López to replace him on the mound with Gerry Staley. Staley gave up a single to pinch-hitter Carl Furillo, allowing two runs to score, and Donovan took the loss in the 3–1 defeat. In Game 5, Donovan was called on in the eighth inning with one out after the Dodgers had loaded the bases, with the White Sox clinging to a 1–0 lead. He got Furillo to hit into a pop fly, then got Don Zimmer to fly out to left field before pitching a scoreless ninth to earn the save for the White Sox. Donovan was also used in Game 6, but he gave up three runs (including a home run to Wally Moon) without recording an out as the White Sox lost the game 9–3 and the Dodgers won the World Series.

During spring training in 1960, the Associated Press reported a rumor that the White Sox were looking to trade Donovan and Earl Battey to the Tigers for Paul Foytack. Nothing came of it, and Foytack had a bad year for the Tigers, going 2–11 with a 6.14 ERA. However, Donovan did not fare much better with the White Sox, perhaps due to a sore arm. He posted a 6.75 ERA in his first 10 games (seven starts), never making it past the seventh inning. After only going 2 2/3 innings in a no-decision (eventual loss) against Detroit on June 2, Donovan was removed from the rotation in favor of Russ Kemmerer. He made just one more start for the club all year, a July 29 game against the Senators in which he relinquished three runs in 3 1/3 innings in an eventual 7–5 loss. His ERA improved somewhat in the bullpen, but it was still 5.38, the highest it had been in any of Donovan's full major league seasons. This was not reflected in his won-loss record, as he finished the season with a 6–1 mark. Still, the White Sox left him unprotected from the expansion draft after the season, and Donovan became an original member of the new Washington Senators franchise.

=== Washington Senators ===
Sports Illustrated did not expect much from Donovan entering the year; their preview of the first-year Senators stated, "In two seasons, 1957–58, Dick Donovan won 31 games for the White Sox. Perhaps he will remember how he did it." Donovan started the first game in the expansion Senators' history, against his old team, the White Sox. He had a 3–2 lead through the sixth inning, but errors by Gene Woodling and Dale Long allowed a couple unearned runs to score, and the Senators lost 4–3. After the game, someone wished Donovan better luck next time; the angry pitcher nearly spit out of rage. Donovan would often be a tough-luck loser that season, losing his first five decisions of the season by one run, including 1–0 loss to Minnesota on April 23. He did not win a game until June 2, against Kansas City. For his second victory, Donovan threw a shutout in the first game of a June 9 doubleheader against his old team the White Sox, but it took the Senators 10 innings to get him a run to give him the win. Through June 30, he was 3–8, but he went 7–2 the rest of the way. Despite his losing record, he was the Senators' lone representative at both of the year's All-Star Games, pitching two scoreless innings in the first one at Candlestick Park. "Donovan is a real professional,” Senators' manager Mickey Vernon said. “He knows how to pitch and gives you an all-out effort. Dick just doesn’t throw the ball -- he has every pitch planned." His record was just 10–10 at season's end, but his pitching was the best of his career, as his 2.40 ERA (a career-low) led the American League. In 168 2/3 innings, he gave up only 138 hits, leading the AL with a 1.026 WHIP. He finished 17th in MVP voting. Shortly after the season, on October 5, the Senators traded him, Gene Green, and Jim Mahoney to the Cleveland Indians for Jimmy Piersall.

=== Cleveland Indians ===
With the Indians in 1962, Donovan had better luck. Used as the Indians' Opening Day starter, he shut out the Red Sox on April 10. In fact, he did not allow a run until his third game of the year, starting the season with 19 scoreless innings. He commenced with an 8–0 start, becoming the first pitcher in the major leagues to eight wins on May 24. Donovan was selected to the AL All-Star team in both games, allowing a run over two innings in the first one and not pitching in the second one. Twice during the year, he hit two home runs in a game—May 18 against Detroit and August 31 against Baltimore; the Indians won both instances. He limited the Orioles to two hits July 2 in a 2–0 victory. On August 26, he limited Boston to two hits in a 4–0 victory; the shutout was his third of the year against the Red Sox. During a game on September 4, he limited the White Sox to two runs through 12 innings but took the loss after giving up a run in the 13th. Donovan was rewarded for his performance in 1962, when he won 20 games for the first time in his career. In 34 starts, he had 16 complete games and five shutouts (most in the AL) in 2501/3 innings pitched, all of them new career-highs, for Cleveland. His ERA was 3.59. After the season, he finished fifth in MVP voting, and the Sporting News named him its AL Pitcher of the Year. The Indians named him their Man of the Year and gave him a $40,000 contract for 1963.

Despite his success in 1962, Donovan was the Indians' third starter for 1963, behind Mudcat Grant and Sam McDowell. On July 5, he held the Yankees to one run, had two hits, and scored a run in a 4–1 victory. Through August 3, he had a 6–10 record, but he won his next four starts by pitching four complete games in a row, including back-to-back shutouts August 8 and August 14 (when he held the White Sox scoreless for 11 innings in a 1–0 victory). In 30 starts, he had an 11–13 record, a 4.24 ERA, three shutouts, 84 strikeouts, and 28 walks in 206 innings. For the second year in a row, he led the league in walks per nine innings, with a 1.2 mark.

Donovan held the Los Angeles Angels to two runs over eight innings and drove in a couple of his own with a single against Ken McBride in a 3–2 victory over the Angels on April 23, 1964. Through August 8, though his record was close to .500 at 6–7, his ERA was 4.72. After that, he was removed from the rotation. Though he made four more starts for the Indians that season, they were all in doubleheaders. Against the White Sox in the second game of a doubleheader during September 6, he relinquished 16 hits but lasted into the 13th inning, when Pete Ward finally drove in a run to give Chicago a 3–2 victory. In 30 games (just 23 starts), he had a 7–9 record, a 4.55 ERA, no shutouts, 83 strikeouts, and 29 walks in 158 1/3 innings.

In 1965, Donovan was again a starter for the Indians, but only for his first two games, after which he was moved to the bullpen. He had not made it through the sixth inning in either of his starts, and the Indians wanted to give more starts to prospects like Sonny Siebert and Luis Tiant. Used all but once in relief after that, he was released June 15 after posting a 5.96 ERA in 12 games. “I figure baseball was good to me,” Donovan said. “I was good to a lot of people in baseball too -- the hitters. It will be nice to take it easy if I don't go with another club.”

During a 15-year major league career, Donovan compiled 122 wins, 880 strikeouts, and a 3.67 ERA, with 101 complete games, 25 shutouts and five saves. In 2,0171/3 innings pitched, he allowed 1,988 hits and 495 walks.

== Playing style ==
Donovan threw three pitches: a fastball, a curveball, and a slider. He learned the slider while pitching for Atlanta, when coach and later manager Whitlow Wyatt helped teach it to him. In 1955, when he finally stuck in a major league team's rotation, Sports Illustrated called it "one of the most effective pitches in baseball." Among pitchers, Donovan was also an unusually gifted hitter. In 1954, he was the team MVP for Atlanta after hitting 12 home runs and driving in 38 runs in only 27 games. With the White Sox, he was frequently used as a pinch-hitter. At the plate in his 15-year major league career, Donovan posted a .163 batting average (113-for-694) with 67 runs, 15 home runs, 64 RBI, and 78 walks.

== Personal life ==
On February 7, 1959, Donovan married Patricia Casey, a Quincy, Massachusetts, resident who was a stewardess for United Airlines. The couple had two children, Peter and Amy. His friend Wyatt gave him the idea to sell insurance, and Donovan had a home business selling insurance during his MLB career. In 1963, he earned his stockbroker's license and joined the Boston-based firm Eastman & Dillon. After his baseball career, he served as the executive vice president for Bache & Co. In 1980, he opened a real estate appraisal office in Quincy, which he ran until 1994. Additionally, Donovan served as distributor with Earth Care Products, a Quincy company that makes products out of recycled plastic. He died from cancer on January 6, 1997.

== See also ==
- List of Major League Baseball all-time leaders in home runs by pitchers
