= Héctor Maestri =

Cuban baseball player (1935-2014)

- Pitcher
- Born: April 19, 1935; Havana, Cuba
- Died: February 21, 2014 (aged 78); Miami, Florida, U.S.
- Batted: Right Threw: Right

MLB debut
- September 24, 1960, for the Washington Senators

Last MLB appearance
- September 17, 1961, for the Washington Senators

MLB statistics
- Win–loss record: 0–1
- Earned run average: 1.13
- Strikeouts: 3
- Stats at Baseball Reference

Teams
- Washington Senators (1960); Washington Senators (1961)

Héctor Anibal Maestri Garcia (April 19, 1935 – February 21, 2014) was a Cuban-born Major League Baseball pitcher. Maestri was one of nine ballplayers to have appeared for both of the 20th century, American League Washington Senators franchises, and one of only three to have played for them in consecutive seasons. (Hal Woodeshick and Rudy Hernández are the others.) In another oddity, he pitched in only one game for each franchise.

In 1956, the right-hander was signed by the Washington Senators of 1901–60; four years later, when the "original" Senators moved to Minneapolis–St. Paul as the Minnesota Twins, he was selected by the Twins' successors in Washington, the expansion Senators of 1961–71, in the 1960 expansion lottery.

Maestri was listed as 5 feet 10 inches (1.78 m) tall and 170 pounds (77 kg). His lone appearance for the earlier Senators, during their final days in the U.S. capital, saw him hurl two scoreless innings of relief against the Baltimore Orioles on September 24, 1960, at Griffith Stadium. Almost a full year later, on September 17, 1961, he appeared in his second and last MLB game for the expansion Washington club, starting and pitching six innings against the Kansas City Athletics, also at Griffith Stadium. He gave up three runs (just one earned) and took the loss in a 3–2 game.

Maestri's two-game career totals were 81/3 innings pitched, seven hits and three bases on balls allowed, three strikeouts, a 0–1 record, and a 1.13 ERA.

Maestri had an eight-year (1957–1962; 1965–1966) minor league career. He died in 2014, aged 78, in Miami.
