= Roy Heiser =

American baseball player

- Pitcher
- Born: June 22, 1942 (age 84); Baltimore, Maryland, U.S.
- Batted: Right Threw: Right

MLB debut
- September 2, 1961, for the Washington Senators

Last MLB appearance
- September 11, 1961, for the Washington Senators

MLB statistics
- Win–loss record: 0–0
- Strikeouts: 1
- Earned run average: 6.35
- Stats at Baseball Reference

Teams
- Washington Senators (1961)

Leroy Barton Heiser (born June 22, 1942) is an American former professional baseball player. A right-handed pitcher, he got into three games in Major League Baseball for the Washington Senators in 1961, his first season in organized baseball. He was born in Baltimore, Maryland, stood 6 feet 4 inches (1.93 m) tall and weighed 190 pounds (86 kg).

Heiser graduated from Catonsville High School and attended the University of Maryland. He was signed by the expansion Senators during their maiden, 1961 season and spent much of the campaign in the Class D Appalachian League, but was recalled by Washington in September. In three relief appearances, largely in a mop-up role, Heiser allowed six hits and nine bases on balls in 52/3 innings pitched, with one strikeout.

He returned to the Senators' farm system in 1962 and toiled there for five more seasons without returning to the majors.
