= Coot Veal =

American baseball player (1932–2021)

- Shortstop
- Born: July 9, 1932; Sandersville, Georgia, U.S.
- Died: March 14, 2021 (aged 88); Macon, Georgia, U.S.
- Batted: Right Threw: Right

MLB debut
- July 30, 1958, for the Detroit Tigers

Last MLB appearance
- June 20, 1963, for the Detroit Tigers

MLB statistics
- Batting average: .231
- Home runs: 1
- Runs batted in: 51
- Stats at Baseball Reference

Teams
- Detroit Tigers (1958–1960); Washington Senators (1961); Pittsburgh Pirates (1962); Detroit Tigers (1963)

Orville Inman "Coot" Veal (July 9, 1932 – March 14, 2021) was an American professional baseball shortstop. He was signed by the Detroit Tigers before the 1952 season and played in all or portions of six seasons in Major League Baseball (MLB) for the Tigers (1958–1960; 1963), Washington Senators (1961), and Pittsburgh Pirates (1962). Born in Sandersville, Georgia, Veal threw and batted right-handed, stood 6 feet 1 inch (1.85 m) tall, and weighed 165 pounds (75 kg).

Veal attended Auburn University, where he played baseball and basketball. Selected in the 1960 American League expansion draft, he was the first player to come to bat in the history of the second modern (1961–71) Washington Senators franchise, now the Texas Rangers. On April 10, 1961, at Griffith Stadium, with President John F. Kennedy having thrown out the first ball, Veal led off the bottom of the first inning against Hall of Fame right-hander Early Wynn of the Chicago White Sox. He reached base on an infield single near third base, was advanced to second on a Marty Keough single to left, then scored (along with Keough) on a Gene Woodling triple.

Veal was a very good defensive shortstop (.976), but his bat was somewhat weak. He had a lifetime average of .231, with 141 hits, 26 doubles, three triples, and one home run (a solo shot against the White Sox' Billy Pierce on August 11, 1959) in 611 total at bats and a slugging percentage of .288. He scored 75 runs and drove in 51 in his 247 big-league games. His last year as an active player was 1964.

Veal was inducted into the Macon, Georgia, Sports Hall of Fame in 2001.

== Death ==
Veal died on March 14, 2021, at the age of 88.
