= Johnny Schaive =

American baseball player (1934-2009)

- Second baseman / Third baseman
- Born: February 25, 1934; Springfield, Illinois, U.S.
- Died: May 11, 2009 (aged 75); Springfield, Illinois, U.S.
- Batted: Right Threw: Right

MLB debut
- September 19, 1958, for the Washington Senators

Last MLB appearance
- April 19, 1963, for the Washington Senators

MLB statistics
- Batting average: .232
- Runs scored: 25
- Home runs: 7
- Runs batted in: 32
- Games played: 114
- Stats at Baseball Reference

Teams
- Washington Senators (original, 1958–1960); Washington Senators (expansion, 1962–1963)

John Edward Schaive (February 25, 1934 – May 11, 2009) was an American backup second and third baseman who played in Major League Baseball between the 1958 and 1963 seasons. Listed at 5 feet 8 inches (1.73 m) tall and 175 pounds (79 kg), Schaive batted and threw right-handed. He was born in Springfield, Illinois.

Schaive spent 14 years in baseball as a player, manager, coach and scout. He signed with the Chicago White Sox in 1952 and started his career in their minor league system. In 1955, he led the Class D Pennsylvania–Ontario–New York League (PONY League) in four offensive categories. The next season, he attended spring training with the Sox' big league camp, but he had to spend two seasons in military service.

When Schaive got back to baseball, he contended he was not the player he once had been and was released by Chicago. Nevertheless, he spent five seasons in the American League, playing from 1958 through 1960 with the original Washington Senators and for the expansion franchise Washington Senators in 1962 and 1963.

In a five-season career, Schaive was a .232 hitter (75-for-323) with seven home runs and 32 RBI in 114 games, including 25 runs, 18 doubles, and one triple without stolen bases.

A .291 hitter in more than 1,100 minor league games, Schaive hit .293 on the Double-A level and .282 in five Triple-A seasons. During his long minor league career, he served as the player-manager of the expansion Senators' York White Roses farm club of the Double-A Eastern League from late May through September 1963.

Schaive died in his hometown of Springfield at the age of 75.
