= Willie Tasby =

American baseball player (1933–2022)

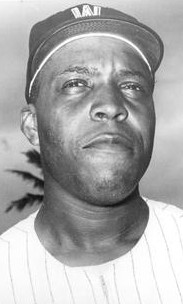
- Center fielder
- Born: January 8, 1933; Shreveport, Louisiana, U.S.
- Died: April 3, 2022 (aged 89); Plant City, Florida, U.S.
- Batted: Right Threw: Right

MLB debut
- September 9, 1958, for the Baltimore Orioles

Last MLB appearance
- September 2, 1963, for the Cleveland Indians

MLB statistics
- Batting average: .250
- Home runs: 46
- Runs batted in: 174
- Stats at Baseball Reference

Teams
- Baltimore Orioles (1958–1960); Boston Red Sox (1960); Washington Senators (1961–1962); Cleveland Indians (1962–1963)

Willie Tasby Jr. (January 8, 1933 – April 3, 2022) was an American professional baseball outfielder. He played in Major League Baseball (MLB), appearing in 583 games as a member of the Baltimore Orioles (1958–1960), Boston Red Sox (1960), Washington Senators (1961–1962) and Cleveland Indians (1962–1963). He was primarily a center fielder, with 459 of his 545 career defensive appearances at the position. Although Tasby was born in Shreveport, Louisiana, he was a graduate of McClymonds High School of Oakland, California, alma mater of star American athletes Bill Russell, Frank Robinson, Curt Flood and Vada Pinson during the 1950s. He also attended Oakland's Laney College.

== Career ==
Tasby threw and batted right-handed, stood 5 feet 11 inches (1.80 m) tall and weighed 170 pounds (77 kg). He began his minor-league career in 1950 in the organization of the St. Louis Browns, predecessors of the modern MLB Orioles. He spent nine seasons in the franchise's farm system before making his major league debut on September 18, 1958, and played in 18 games for the Orioles at the end of the season. Tasby's performance in 1959 was solid as he played 142 games and batted .250 with 13 home runs, while patrolling center field for the Orioles. Baltimore's sixth-place finish in the AL was not impressive, but Tasby's rookie performance was, as he was selected to the inaugural Topps All-Star Rookie Team along with future Hall of Famer Willie McCovey.

In 1960, the Orioles were much improved. They contended for the AL pennant until late September. In June, however, with a tenuous hold on first place, they were swept in a four-game series at home by the Detroit Tigers. June 9 was the low point for Tasby, as his Orioles lost both ends of a double header to the Tigers and then traded him to the last-place Boston Red Sox. Boston plugged Tasby right into their lineup, and the center fielder responded with a career-best .281 batting average.

Tasby's performance for the Red Sox garnered some attention, as he became an expansion draft selection of the new Washington Senators franchise. The expansion Senators' opening season showed promise for Tasby. He started 134 games in center field, hit a career-high 17 home runs and collected 63 RBI in 141 games played. However, Washington acquired former American League All-Star center fielder Jimmy Piersall during the offseason. Then, after just 11 games with Washington in 1962, seven as the club's left fielder, Tasby was traded on May 5 to the Cleveland Indians for pitchers Steve Hamilton and Don Rudolph. Tasby scratched out 127 games over two partial seasons with Cleveland to finish his big-league career. All told, Tasby collected 467 hits in the majors, with 61 doubles, ten triples and 46 home runs accompanying his .250 career batting mark. He was credited with 174 runs batted in.

Willie Tasby died on April 3, 2022, at the age of 89. He is buried in Plant City, Florida.
