= Danny O'Connell =

American baseball player (1929–1969)

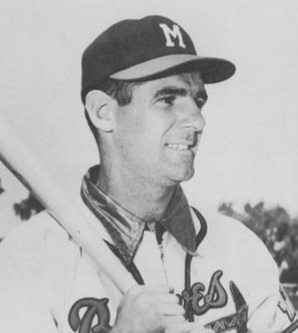
- O'Connell, circa 1954
- Second baseman / Third baseman
- Born: January 21, 1929; Paterson, New Jersey, U.S.
- Died: October 2, 1969 (aged 40); Clifton, New Jersey, U.S.
- Batted: Right Threw: Right

MLB debut
- July 14, 1950, for the Pittsburgh Pirates

Last MLB appearance
- September 26, 1962, for the Washington Senators

MLB statistics
- Batting average: .260
- Home runs: 39
- Runs batted in: 320
- Stats at Baseball Reference

Teams
- Pittsburgh Pirates (1950, 1953); Milwaukee Braves (1954–1957); New York / San Francisco Giants (1957–1959); Washington Senators (1961–1962)

Daniel Francis O'Connell (January 21, 1929 – October 2, 1969) was an American infielder in Major League Baseball for the Pittsburgh Pirates (1950; 1953), Milwaukee Braves (1954–57), New York/San Francisco Giants (1957–59) and Washington Senators (1961–62). During his MLB career, he was listed at 5 feet 11 inches (1.80 m) tall and weighed 168 pounds (76 kg). He threw and batted right-handed.

As a member of the San Francisco Giants, O'Connell scored the first run in the first big-league baseball game played on the West Coast on April 15, 1958. After drawing a base on balls against Don Drysdale of the Los Angeles Dodgers in the third inning, he advanced to third base on another walk and a single before scoring on a sacrifice fly by Jim Davenport. The Giants won, 8–0.

== Career ==
O'Connell was a native of Paterson, New Jersey. He initially signed with the Brooklyn Dodgers and played four years in their farm system. He was sold to the Pirates after the 1949 season while still a minor leaguer, and called up in mid-July 1950. He proceeded to hit .292 (1950) and .294 (1953) in consecutive seasons bracketed by United States Army service during the Korean War (1951–52). O'Connell finished third in voting for the 1950 National League Rookie of the Year and 16th in voting for the 1953 NL Most Valuable Player.

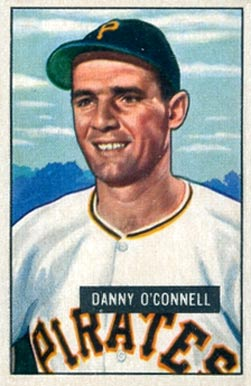
A Bowman baseball card of O'Connell in 1951 during his tenure with the Pittsburgh Pirates.

The Pirates then traded him to Milwaukee on December 26, 1953, getting six players and $100,000 in cash in return. Although he'd been primarily a third baseman and shortstop with Pittsburgh, the Braves shifted him to second base, where he was a regular for 31/2 seasons (1954 through June 15, 1957). Then, at the trading deadline, the Braves sent O'Connell to the New York Giants, along with outfielder Bobby Thomson and pitcher Ray Crone, veteran second baseman Red Schoendienst, who helped lead Milwaukee to the 1957 World Series title.

O'Connell lost his regular job in 1959, and then returned to Triple-A for all of 1960 before drawing his unconditional release. Signed as a free agent by the 1961–71 edition of the Senators, just created as an expansion team, he played in that franchise's first regular season game, on April 10, 1961 at Griffith Stadium in the traditional Presidential opener. He went two for four, but Washington lost to the Chicago White Sox, 4–3. O'Connell split the year between second and third base, starting 132 games. He led the Senators in base hits (128) and the American League in sacrifice hits (15) in 1961. After playing a reduced role for the 1962 Senators, O'Connell became the player-manager of the York White Roses, Washington's Double-A farm team, in 1963. But on May 22, he was recalled to Washington to serve as the Senators' first-base coach. He held that job for the rest of 1963 and all of 1964 before leaving baseball.

In ten seasons in the Majors, O'Connell played in 1,143 games and had 4,035 at bats, 527 runs scored, 1,049 hits, 181 doubles, 35 triples, 39 home runs, 320 runs batted in, 48 stolen bases, 431 walks, .260 batting average, .333 on-base percentage, .351 slugging percentage, 1,417 total bases and 89 sacrifice hits.

O'Connell, who was residing in Bloomfield, New Jersey, died on October 2, 1969, in nearby Clifton at the age of 40 from a heart attack while driving his Ford which then crashed into a utility pole. He left his wife, Vera, and four children, Maureen, Danny Jr., Nancy and John. He was buried at Immaculate Conception Cemetery in Montclair.

Preceded by George Case	Washington Senators first base coach 1963–1964	Succeeded by Joe Pignatano
