= Pete Daley =

American baseball player (1930–2024)

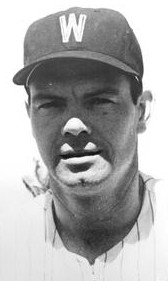
- Daley in 1961
- Catcher
- Born: January 14, 1930; Grass Valley, California, U.S.
- Died: August 22, 2024 (aged 94); Marysville, California, U.S.
- Batted: Right Threw: Right

MLB debut
- May 3, 1955, for the Boston Red Sox

Last MLB appearance
- October 1, 1961, for the Washington Senators

MLB statistics
- Batting average: .239
- Home runs: 18
- Runs batted in: 120

Teams
- Boston Red Sox (1955–1959); Kansas City Athletics (1960); Washington Senators (1961)

Peter Harvey Daley (January 14, 1930 – August 22, 2024) was an American professional baseball catcher. Daley played in Major League Baseball from 1955 through 1961 for the Boston Red Sox (1955–59), Kansas City Athletics (1960) and Washington Senators (1961). He batted and threw right-handed.

== Biography ==
In a seven-season career, Daley posted a .239 batting average with 18 home runs and 120 runs batted in (RBIs) in 391 games played. Daley was served as a backup for Sammy White with the Boston Red Sox. His most productive season came in 1956, when he compiled career numbers in average (.267), home runs (five), RBIs (29), runs (22), hits (50) and doubles (11). Before the 1960 season Daley was traded by Boston to the Kansas City Athletics in exchange for pitcher Tom Sturdivant. With the Athletics, he shared catching duties with Harry Chiti. Then, he was selected by the new Washington Senators in the 1960 MLB expansion draft, spending one season with them to end his major league career.

Daley died in Marysville, California, on August 22, 2024, at the age of 94.
