= Lew Morton (baseball) =

American baseball player

- First baseman
- Born: September 4, 1920; Fort Scott, Kansas, U.S.
- Died: May 30, 1996 (aged 75); Oklahoma City, Oklahoma, U.S.
- Batted: Left

James Lewis Morton (September 4, 1920 – May 30, 1996) was an American professional baseball player who played from 1946 to 1959. Though he spent eight full seasons at Triple-A and hit over 230 home runs, he never reached the major leagues.

He was born in Fort Scott, Kansas. He began his professional career in the St. Louis Cardinals system, hitting 12 home runs. The next year, with the unaffiliated Henderson Oilers, he batted .363 with 22 home runs, 202 hits, 46 doubles and 145 runs scored, tying Bob Marquis for the Lone Star League lead in runs. He was in the New York Yankees system in 1948, hitting 17 home runs, and in 1949, with the unaffiliated Longview Texans, he hit .362 with 19 home runs. With the Dallas Eagles in 1950, he hit 13 home runs. He joined the Triple-A Toronto Maple Leafs in 1951, with whom he would spend most of the rest of his career. The first two seasons were spent in the St. Louis Browns organization, then the Maple Leafs became unaffiliated. Despite hitting only .236 his first season with the club, he hit 21 home runs and scored 90 runs; the next year, he hit 17 home runs and scored 84 times. He was also featured on a Parkhurst baseball card. and in 1953, he had 16 home runs, 35 doubles and 83 RBI, while batting .307. He hit 11, 12 and 16 home runs from 1954 to 1956, respectively, and in 1957 he hit 25 home runs, a career high. The following year, he hit 12 homers and in 1959 - his final season - he hit 21 home runs for the Memphis Chickasaws.

Overall, he hit .289 with 1,849 hits, 234 home runs and 310 doubles. Per the records available, he never struck out more than he walked in a season.

In 1961 and 1962, he managed the Middlesboro Senators, leading the club to a first place finish and de facto league championship victory the first season and to a third place finish the latter campaign.

He later scouted for 30 years, working for the Los Angeles Dodgers (1970–1995) as well as the New York Yankees and Washington Senators.
