= Carl Bouldin =

American baseball player (born 1939)

- Pitcher
- Born: September 17, 1939 (age 86); Germantown, Kentucky, U.S.
- Batted: Both Threw: Right

MLB debut
- September 2, 1961, for the Washington Senators

Last MLB appearance
- July 5, 1964, for the Washington Senators

MLB statistics
- Win–loss record: 3–8
- Earned run average: 6.15
- Strikeouts: 36
- Stats at Baseball Reference

Teams
- Washington Senators (1961–1964)

Carl Edward Bouldin (born September 17, 1939) is an American former Major League Baseball pitcher who also played college baseball and college basketball for the University of Cincinnati, where he was a member of the NCAA Championship-winning 1960–61 Cincinnati Bearcats men's basketball team. He played in an NCAA national championship game and in Major League Baseball the same year. Bouldin was listed as 6 feet 2 inches (1.88 m) and 180 pounds (82 kg); in baseball, he was a switch hitter who threw right-handed.

== Early life ==
Bouldin was born in Germantown, Kentucky and grew up in Norwood, Ohio in Greater Cincinnati. He attended Norwood High School and played basketball for coach Dick Dallmer, who was an All-American at the University of Cincinnati, and baseball, graduating in 1957. He is Norwood's all-time leading scorer in basketball.

== College basketball career ==
Bouldin attended the University of Cincinnati, where he excelled in both basketball and baseball. In basketball, as a sophomore in 1958–59, with the Bearcats led by coach George Smith and future Hall-of-Famer Oscar Robertson and his 32.6 points per game, Bouldin averaged 2.3 points and 1.0 rebound per game as a backup to starting guards Mike Mendenhall and Ralph Davis, who averaged 13.5 and 15.5 points, respectively. The Bearcats posted a 26–4 record and won the Missouri Valley Conference (MVC) championship, and advanced to the NCAA final Four, where they finished in third place nationally.

As a junior in 1959–60, Bouldin became a starting guard alongside Davis, with Bouldin averaging 5.8 points and 1.8 rebounds per game, with the team again led by Robertson and joined by new center Paul Hogue. The Bearcats went 28–2, won the MVC title and again advanced to the NCAA final Four, where once again they had to settle for third place.

By Bouldin's senior season of 1960–61, with Robertson graduated and new coach Ed Jucker leading the Bearcats, Bouldin was team co-captain with Bob Wiesenhahn, who both started along with Hogue and newcomers forward Tom Thacker and guard Tony Yates to form an athletic, physical, balanced attack. Bouldin averaged 11.7 points and 2.8 rebounds and led the team with an .800 free throw percentage. The Bearcats posted a 27–3 record, successfully defended their MVC title, and for the third consecutive season advanced to the NCAA final Four. This time, however, the results were different. In the national semifinal game, Bouldin poured in a team-high 21 points as the Bearcats defeated Utah, 82–67. Then, he scored 16 points as the Bearcats defeated Ohio State in the NCAA championship game 70–65 in overtime to win their first national championship.

== College baseball career ==
In baseball, Bouldin was a pitcher as the baseball team was also coached by Ed Jucker. Bouldin set or tied several records—his 2.38 earned run average (ERA) still ranks sixth in UC history, and his .206 opponent batting average ranks third. For a single season, his 1.41 ERA in 1959 ranks third all-time, and his .186 opponent batting average that season ranks seventh. The Bearcats posted winning records every season Bouldin played, including his senior season of 1961 under new coach Glenn Sample when the Bearcats went 19–5–2 and won the Missouri Valley Conference title.

== Professional baseball career ==
Bouldin was selected in the 14th round of the 1961 NBA draft by the Cincinnati Royals, but the two-sport college star decided the professional baseball was the best option. He signed with the Washington Senators. He began the 1961 season in the short-season Appalachian League with the Middleboro Senators, and later that season pitched for the Alabama–Florida League Pensacola Senators.

During the season, he was called up to the Major League Washington Senators, and made his first MLB appearance on September 2, 1961, allowing one run in two innings in a 13–7 loss to the Chicago White Sox. He appeared in one more game, which he started and gave up five runs in just 1.1 innings, taking the loss against the Baltimore Orioles.

However, his minor league season was more successful as, between Middlesboro and Pensacola, he compiled a 9–5 record with a 2.97 ERA.

In the 1962 season, Bouldin played most of the season in the minors with the Class AAA Syracuse Chiefs of the International League, but he did pitch in six games in the major leagues for the Senators, going 1–2 with a 5.85 ERA. In 1963, he pitched most of the season with the Toronto Maple Leafs of the International League. But he again saw major league action with the Senators, posting a 2–2 record with a 5.79 ERA.

The 1964 season was his fourth and final in the big leagues, as he pitched nine games for the Senators, going 0–3 with a 5.40 ERA. He played most of the season in the minors, first for Toronto and then for the Indianapolis Indians, the Pacific Coast League affiliate of the Chicago White Sox. In 1965 he pitched again for Indianapolis; it was the final season of his professional baseball career.

== Personal life ==
Bouldin is retired and resides in Newport, Kentucky with his wife, Ann.

In 1982, he was inducted into the University of Cincinnati Athletics Hall of Fame. In 1992, he was an inaugural inductee into the Norwood High School Athletic Hall of Fame.
