= Ken Retzer =

American baseball player (1934–2020)

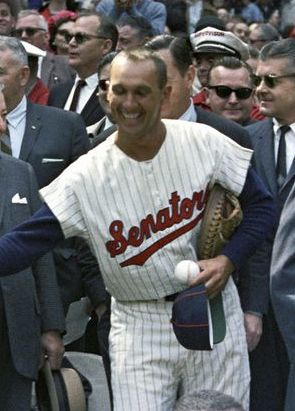
- Retzer on Opening Day, 1963.
- Catcher
- Born: April 30, 1934; Wood River, Illinois, U.S.
- Died: May 17, 2020 (aged 86); Sun City, Arizona, U.S.
- Batted: Left Threw: Right

MLB debut
- September 9, 1961, for the Washington Senators

Last MLB appearance
- October 3, 1964, for the Washington Senators

MLB statistics
- Batting average: .264
- Home runs: 14
- Runs batted in: 72
- Stats at Baseball Reference

Teams
- Washington Senators (1961–1964)

Kenneth Leo Retzer (April 30, 1934 – May 17, 2020) was an American professional baseball player. He was a catcher in Major League Baseball for the Washington Senators from 1961 to 1964, appearing in 237 games played. Retzer batted left-handed, threw right-handed and was listed as 6 feet (1.83 m) tall and 185 pounds (84 kg).

Born in Wood River, Illinois, Retzer attended Jefferson City Community College and the University of Central Missouri. He was signed by the Cleveland Indians before the 1954 season, but played his entire major league career for the Senators after Washington acquired him in a September 1961 trade. He was the Senators' most-used catcher in both 1962 (starting 91 games and platooning with right-handed-batting Bob Schmidt) and 1963 (72 starts in a three-way platoon with Don Leppert and Hobie Landrith). In 1962, Retzer batted a career-best .285 with 97 hits and eight home runs, and was a serious candidate for Rookie of the Year honors. On Opening Day in 1963, Retzer caught the ceremonial first pitch thrown by President John F. Kennedy. Retzer was also known for catching the first pitch of MLB's 100,000th game on September 6, 1963; the ball was presented to and preserved in the Baseball Hall of Fame.

He finished his career with a lifetime batting mark of .264, 182 hits, 14 homers, 72 runs batted in and 65 runs scored. He had a lifetime fielding percentage of .983 and threw out 48 of 126 baserunners making stolen base attempts, a rate of 38.1 percent.

Retzer's 13-season pro career ended in 1967. Retzer died at his home on May 17, 2020.
