= R. C. Stevens =

American baseball player (1934–2010)

R C Stevens
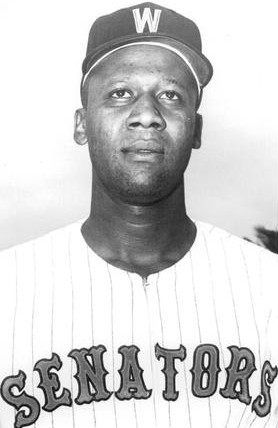
- First baseman
- Born: July 22, 1934; Moultrie, Georgia, U.S.
- Died: November 30, 2010 (aged 76); Davenport, Iowa, U.S.
- Batted: Right Threw: Left

MLB debut
- April 15, 1958, for the Pittsburgh Pirates

Last MLB appearance
- June 10, 1961, for the Washington Senators

MLB statistics
- Batting average: .210
- Home runs: 8
- Hits: 34
- Stats at Baseball Reference

Teams
- Pittsburgh Pirates (1958–1960); Washington Senators (1961)

R.C. Stevens (July 22, 1934 – November 30, 2010) was an American Major League Baseball first baseman. He was signed by the Pittsburgh Pirates before the 1952 season and traded to the Washington Senators on December 16, 1960. He played for the Pirates from 1958 to 1960, and for the Washington Senators in 1961. At 6 feet 5 inches (1.96 m) and 219 pounds (99 kg), he was one of few position players who batted right-handed and threw left-handed in the major leagues.

Stevens was the first player to appear as a pinch hitter in modern Washington Senators history. On April 10, 1961, in the bottom of the ninth inning, he batted for catcher Pete Daley against Chicago White Sox relief pitcher Frank Baumann. He hit into a fielder's choice groundout in the eventual 4–3 loss.

Stevens had a lifetime batting average of .210, with eight home runs, 21 RBI, a slugging percentage of .395 in 210 at bats and scored 21 runs in 104 games. Defensively, Stevens was charged with two errors in 426 total chances for a .995 fielding percentage in 388.1 innings at first base.
