= Marty Kutyna =

American baseball player (born 1932)

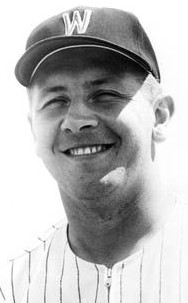
- Pitcher
- Born: November 14, 1932 (age 93); Philadelphia, Pennsylvania, U.S.
- Batted: Right Threw: Right

MLB debut
- September 19, 1959, for the Kansas City Athletics

Last MLB appearance
- September 22, 1962, for the Washington Senators

MLB statistics
- Win–loss record: 14–16
- Earned run average: 3.88
- Strikeouts: 110
- Stats at Baseball Reference

Teams
- Kansas City Athletics (1959–1960); Washington Senators (1961–1962)

Marion John "Marty" Kutyna (born November 14, 1932) is an American former right-handed pitcher in professional baseball. Kutyna spent three full seasons in Major League Baseball, pitching almost exclusively in relief. He stood 6 feet (1.8 m) tall, weighed 190 pounds (86 kg), and batted right-handed.

The Philadelphia native graduated from North Catholic High School. He signed with the St. Louis Cardinals in 1953 and promptly won 17 and 18 games during his first two years in minor league baseball. But Kutyna never reached the Major League level with the Redbirds. Instead, he was part of a package of players that St. Louis swapped to the Cincinnati Redlegs on December 5, 1957, for young center fielder Curt Flood, who would go on to star on three pennant-winning Cardinal teams in the 1960s.

Kutyna toiled in the minors for nearly seven years before he finally reached the Majors on September 19, 1959, as a member of the Kansas City Athletics. He pitched the entire 1960 season for the Athletics, before being traded to the newly formed expansion edition of the Washington Senators for catcher and future Athletics manager Haywood Sullivan on December 29, 1960.

Kutyna would spend two full seasons (1961–62) with the Senators, appearing in 104 games. He made just six starts among his 50 games in 1961, but he threw a total of 143 innings. Overall, Kutyna was 14–16, with a 3.88 earned run average in 159 career games. He allowed 301 hits and 108 bases on balls in 290 innings pitched, with 110 strikeouts, eight saves and no complete games in six assignments as a starting pitcher.

His professional career ended with the 1963 season, which he spent as member of the Triple-A Buffalo Bisons.
