= Joe Hicks (baseball) =

American baseball player (1932–2023)

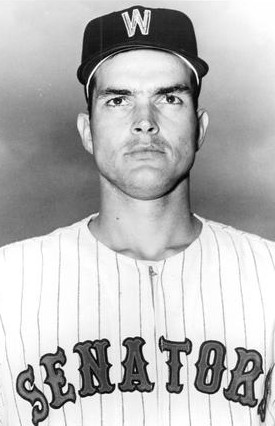
- Outfielder
- Born: April 7, 1932; Ivy, Virginia, U.S.
- Died: December 2, 2023 (aged 91); Charlottesville, Virginia, U.S.
- Batted: Left Threw: Right

MLB debut
- September 18, 1959, for the Chicago White Sox

Last MLB appearance
- September 29, 1963, for the New York Mets

MLB statistics
- Batting average: .221
- Home runs: 12
- Runs batted in: 39
- Stats at Baseball Reference

Teams
- Chicago White Sox (1959–1960); Washington Senators (1961–1962); New York Mets (1963)

William Joseph Hicks (April 7, 1932 – December 2, 2023) was an American professional baseball player. He appeared in 212 games played in Major League Baseball over all or parts of five seasons as an outfielder and pinch hitter for the Chicago White Sox (1959–60), Washington Senators (1961–62) and New York Mets (1963).

== Biography ==
Born in Ivy, Virginia on Decca Farm, he batted left-handed, threw right-handed, and was listed as 6 feet (1.83 m) tall and 180 pounds (82 kg). He graduated from high school in Charlottesville, where he attended the University of Virginia.

Hicks signed with the White Sox in 1953, beginning his pro career. After five seasons in the minor leagues and two years of service in the United States Army, Hicks was recalled by the pennant-bound White Sox in September 1959. He collected three hits and batted .429 in seven at bats during his late-season trial, then spent much of 1960 on the Chisox' MLB roster, almost exclusively as a pinch hitter. He hit only .191 and was left exposed in the expansion draft. Selected by the new Washington Senators as the 52nd overall pick, Hicks spent most of 1961 at Triple-A after an early-season audition with the Senators. However, he remained on the Washington roster during the full 1962 campaign, playing in 102 games, starting 29 in the outfield. He hit six home runs in limited service, but he batted only .224 overall and his contract was sold to the Mets at the close of the campaign.

In his final MLB year, Hicks started 46 games for the 1963 Mets, and hit .226 with five home runs. He concluded his career with a three-year stint with Triple-A Buffalo. Hicks was a solid offensive player in the minor leagues, batting .313 in 11 seasons. But limited playing time in the majors hurt his production: he collected only 92 total hits, with 11 doubles, three triples and 12 homers, in his 212 games, batting .221.

== Personal life ==
Hicks met his wife while playing for the Boer Indians in Nicaragua.

Joe Hicks died on December 2, 2023, at the age of 91.

Hicks' grandson is professional soccer player Lee Johnston.
