= Dan Daniels (sportscaster) =

American sportscaster (1922–2012)

Drane

Clarence Drane "Dan" Daniels (July 20, 1922 – August 13, 2012) was an American sportscaster who called games for the Washington Redskins of the National Football League, the Washington Senators of Major League Baseball and for various college events.

He was born on July 20, 1922, in Americus, Georgia, growing up Jacksonville, Florida. His original surname was Daniel, without the s at the end. He never legally changed his surname to Daniels, though he used the pseudonym to avoid being confused with sportswriter Dan Daniel. He attended the University of Florida.

He initially joined WTOP-TV in 1956 and by 1961, he was announcing games for the Senators, working alongside John MacLean. He worked in that role until 1968. In 1969, he moved to WRC-TV, with whom he remained until 1979. He announced the Washington Redskins' first Super Bowl game in January 1973, a 14–7 loss to the unbeaten Miami Dolphins.

After his broadcasting career, he ran a printing business called Dan Daniels Printing.

He died on August 13, 2012, after a fall in his Bethesda, Maryland, home.
