= Ed Hobaugh =

American baseball player (born 1934)

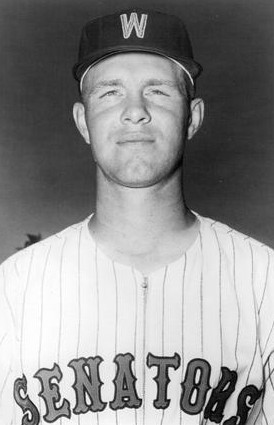
- Hobaugh in 1961
- Pitcher
- Born: June 27, 1934 (age 90); Kittanning, Pennsylvania, U.S.
- Batted: Right Threw: Right

MLB debut
- April 19, 1961, for the Washington Senators

Last MLB appearance
- September 27, 1963, for the Washington Senators

MLB statistics
- Win–loss record: 9–10
- Earned run average: 4.34
- Strikeouts: 115
- Stats at Baseball Reference

Teams
- Washington Senators (1961–1963)

Edward Russell Hobaugh (born June 27, 1934) is an American former professional baseball player. He pitched in 61 Major League Baseball (MLB) games between 1961 and 1963 for the Washington Senators. During his playing career, he was listed at 6 feet 2 inches (1.88 m) and 176 pounds (80 kg).

== Biography ==
Hobaugh was born in Kittanning, Pennsylvania, and attended Michigan State University.

Hobaugh signed with the Chicago White Sox in 1956, and threw a no-hitter in the Class B Three-I League during his first professional season. He then spent two years (1957–1958) serving in the United States Army. After toiling at the Triple-A level for the ChiSox in 1959–1960, he was selected by the Washington Senators in the 12th round of the 1960 MLB expansion draft.

Hobaugh spent the full season of 1961 and parts of 1962–1963 as a member of the Washington major-league pitching staff. He was the starting pitcher in the expansion Senators' fifth official game on April 19, 1961, against the White Sox. Although he lasted only 2 2/3 innings in his maiden start, Hobaugh recovered to pitch effectively and hold a spot in Washington's rotation through late July, winning six of 11 decisions and hurling three complete games. He then switched to the bullpen and was primarily a relief pitcher for the remainder of his major-league career. In 1963, Hobaugh began the season in the minor leagues, and apart from a nine-game call-up with the Senators in September, he spent the rest of his professional career in the minors.

In his 61 major-league games pitched, 21 as a starter, Hobaugh compiled a 9–10 win–loss record, allowing 228 hits and 95 walks in 211 2/3 innings pitched. He struck out 115 batters and was credited with one save. As a hitter, Hobaugh had a major-league batting average of .127; he hit a home run in his final major-league at bat, in September 1963.

The native of Western Pennsylvania was eventually acquired by the Pittsburgh Pirates and he spent the remainder of his minor-league pitching career with the Pirates, except for a temporary return to the White Sox system. After retiring from the mound in 1969, Hobaugh briefly managed in Class A in the Pirates' organization.

== See also ==
- List of Major League Baseball players with a home run in their final major league at bat
