= Dale Long =

American baseball player (1926–1991)

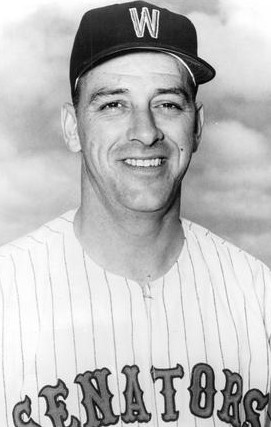
- Long in 1961
- First baseman
- Born: February 6, 1926; Springfield, Missouri, U.S.
- Died: January 27, 1991 (aged 64); Palm Coast, Florida, U.S.
- Batted: Left Threw: Left

MLB debut
- April 21, 1951, for the Pittsburgh Pirates

Last MLB appearance
- July 18, 1963, for the New York Yankees

MLB statistics
- Batting average: .267
- Home runs: 132
- Runs batted in: 467
- Stats at Baseball Reference

Teams
- Pittsburgh Pirates (1951); St. Louis Browns (1951); Pittsburgh Pirates (1955–1957); Chicago Cubs (1957–1959); San Francisco Giants (1960); New York Yankees (1960); Washington Senators (1961–1962); New York Yankees (1962–1963)

Career highlights and awards
- All-Star (1956); World Series champion (1962)

Richard Dale Long (February 6, 1926 – January 27, 1991) was an American first baseman in Major League Baseball with the Pittsburgh Pirates, St. Louis Browns, Chicago Cubs, San Francisco Giants, New York Yankees and Washington Senators between 1951 and 1963. Listed as 6 feet 4 inches (1.93 m) tall and 205 pounds (93 kg), he batted and threw left-handed.

Long's career was marked by two milestones. In 1956, he set an MLB record by hitting a home run in eight consecutive games. Then, two years later, Long became the first left-handed-throwing catcher in the majors since Jiggs Donahue in 1902.

== Career ==
A native of Springfield, Missouri, Long graduated from high school in Adams, Massachusetts, and turned down an offer from the Green Bay Packers to play football, opting instead for a baseball contract. He got into one game at age 18 for the top-level Milwaukee Brewers of the American Association during the wartime 1944 season, then began his career in earnest in 1945 in the Cincinnati Reds' organization. Long spent six more full seasons in the minor leagues, playing for five different parent clubs, before he debuted with the Pirates in 1951, ending that season with the St. Louis Browns. During his spring training with the 1951 Pirates, the southpaw first baseman was convinced to try catching by the club's general manager, Hall of Famer Branch Rickey. The experiment ended after one game, but Long would briefly return to the position again in the majors seven years later.

After 31/2 additional seasons in the minors (including an MVP-winning 1953 campaign in the Pacific Coast League) Pittsburgh gave Long another chance in 1955. He hit .291 with 79 RBIs, while collecting double-figure totals in extra-base hits with 19 doubles, 13 triples (best among MLB players), and 16 home runs.

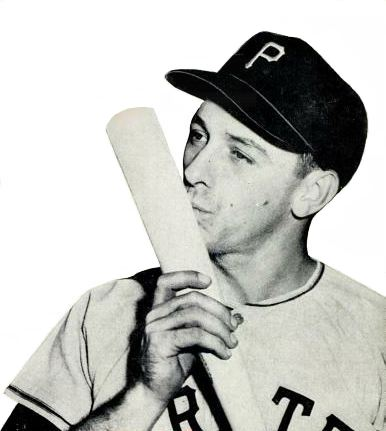
Long, circa 1956

In 1956, Long posted career highs in home runs (27) and RBI (91), made the National League All-Star team, and put his name in the record books by hitting eight home runs in eight consecutive games between May 19 and May 28, breaking the previous mark of six straight games, shared by Ken Williams (1922), George Kelly (1924), Lou Gehrig (1931), Walker Cooper (1947) and Willie Mays (1955). Since then, his achievement has been matched only by Don Mattingly (1987) and Ken Griffey Jr. (1993), both in the American League.

Long's home-run binge capped a torrid start to his 1956 season. He collected 15 hits—raising his batting average from .384 to .411—and 17 runs batted in during the eight-game stretch. With his batting average still above .310 in June, Long was selected as the National League's starting first baseman in the 1956 Major League Baseball All-Star Game, played at Griffith Stadium on July 10. He was hitless in two at bats, but the Senior Circuit won the game, 7–3. It would be Long's only appearance in a midsummer classic.

Traded to the Cubs in May 1957, Long belted 55 homers for them in 21/2 seasons. In the latter weeks of 1958, he became the majors' first southpaw catcher since Donahue, 56 years before. Long performed this feat in a pair of Cubs losses at Wrigley Field, during the first game of a doubleheader versus the Pirates on August 20 and on September 21 against the Los Angeles Dodgers. In both cases, he had been shifted from first base in the ninth inning and wore his first-baseman's mitt, rather than a catcher's glove, on his right hand. He caught 12/3 total innings, and recorded one assist, without an error, although he did permit a passed ball. In 1959, he tied another home run record, when he hit back-to-back pinch-hit homers.

In 1960, Long divided his playing time between the Giants and Yankees. As a member of the Yankees, he faced his former Pirates' team in the 1960 World Series. His pinch single in the ninth inning of Game 7 helped the Yankees tie the score at 9–9, but that only set the stage for Bill Mazeroski's Series-winning blow in the Pittsburgh half of the frame.

Long was selected by the "new" Washington Senators in the 1960 Major League Baseball expansion draft, and was the club's regular first baseman during its maiden 1961 season. But in July 1962, he was traded back to the Yankees for young outfielder Don Lock. When the Yanks won the 1962 World Series over the Giants, Long earned a championship ring. He was a late-inning substitute for regular Bill Skowron in Game 1, and drove in an insurance run with a single in the eighth inning of the Yankees' 6–2 victory. Then, he started Game 2 at Candlestick Park and was hitless in three at bats. For the Series, he was one-for-five overall as New York prevailed in seven games. Long's MLB playing career ended in August 1963. The Bombers removed him from the active roster and named him as an extra coach on manager Ralph Houk's staff through the rest of the season. He wasn't activated for the September stretch drive or the 1963 World Series, when New York fell to the Dodgers in four straight games. Long's 21-season professional playing career concluded with a 24-game stint with the Triple-A Jacksonville Suns in 1964. He briefly remained in baseball as an umpire in the minor leagues in the late 1960s.

In his ten-season MLB career, Long was a .267 hitter with 805 hits, 132 home runs and 467 RBI in 1,013 games. He recorded a .988 fielding percentage as a first baseman. In World Series play, he hit .250 in eight at bats, with two singles and one run batted in.

Dale Long died of cancer at age 64.

== See also ==
- List of Major League Baseball annual triples leaders
- List of Major League Baseball individual streaks
