= Harry Bright =

American baseball player (1929–2000)

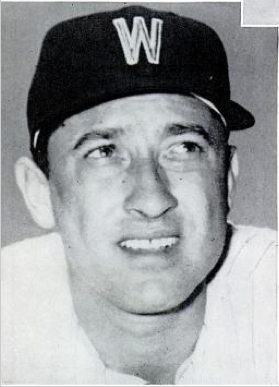
- Bright in 1962.
- First baseman / Third baseman
- Born: September 22, 1929; Kansas City, Missouri, U.S.
- Died: March 13, 2000 (aged 70); Sacramento, California, U.S.
- Batted: Right Threw: Right

MLB debut
- August 7, 1958, for the Pittsburgh Pirates

Last MLB appearance
- June 30, 1965, for the Chicago Cubs

MLB statistics
- Batting average: .255
- Home runs: 32
- Runs batted in: 126
- Stats at Baseball Reference

Teams
- Pittsburgh Pirates (1958–1960); Washington Senators (1961–1962); Cincinnati Reds (1963); New York Yankees (1963–1964); Chicago Cubs (1965)

Harry James Bright (September 22, 1929 – March 13, 2000) was an American professional baseball first baseman, third baseman and utility player in Major League Baseball over all or parts of eight seasons, from 1958 to 1965, for the Pittsburgh Pirates, Washington Senators, Cincinnati Reds, New York Yankees and Chicago Cubs. Born in Kansas City, Missouri, Bright stood 6 feet (1.8 m) tall, weighed 190 pounds (86 kg), and threw and batted right-handed.

== Versatile journeyman ==
During his minor league playing career, Bright was known for his versatility in the field, his batting ability, and (during the era before free agency in baseball) his frequent changes of address. He played every infield position, caught and played the outfield. In a 12-year stretch, 1947 through 1958, he played for 14 different minor league teams and at least four different MLB organizations. At the plate, he led the Class C West Texas–New Mexico League in batting average in 1950 with a .413 mark. Two years later, as the 22-year-old playing manager of the Janesville Cubs of the Class D Wisconsin State League, Bright led the league in runs batted in with 101 — although Janesville finished seventh in the eight-team WSL.

Bright's best minor league season came when he was a 30-year-old veteran playing for the 1960 Salt Lake City Bees in the Pacific Coast League. He slugged 27 home runs, led the PCL with 119 RBI and batted .313. Bright was a fixture in the Pacific Coast League of the 1950s, having played three and a half seasons for the Sacramento Solons (1955–58). He became a resident of Sacramento, California, and later managed the Solons in 1975.

== Major League career ==
Bright's first major league trials came with the Pittsburgh Pirates, where he played in parts of the 1958 and 1960 seasons, and spent all of 1959 on the Pirates roster, appearing in 40 games in a utility role. On December 16, 1960, he was traded to the American League's new expansion franchise, the Washington Senators, where he played two full seasons and enjoyed his most sustained success. In 1962, he appeared in 113 games, mostly at first base, swatted 17 homers, knocked in 67 RBI and batted .273. But at season's end, the Senators swapped the 33-year-old Bright to the Cincinnati Reds for a young first baseman, Rogelio Álvarez.

Bright batted only once for the 1963 Reds before his contract was sold on April 21 to the defending world champion New York Yankees, who were seeking a right-handed hitter off their bench. He stuck with the club all season long, batting .236 with seven homers in 157 at-bats as the Yanks copped another AL pennant.

== 1963 World Series ==
Then, in Game 1 of the 1963 World Series, Bright made history when he was sent up as a ninth-inning pinch hitter against Sandy Koufax of the Los Angeles Dodgers. Bright struck out, enabling Koufax to set a new mark (broken five years later by Bob Gibson) for strikeouts (15) in a World Series game. Said Bright: "It's a hell of a thing. I wait 17 years to get into a World Series. Then I finally get up there, and 69,000 people are yelling — yelling for me to strike out." To compound matters, the game was played in Bright's home ballpark, Yankee Stadium.

Bright struck out again in his only other World Series at bat and by mid-May 1964 he had returned to the minors with the Triple-A Richmond Virginians. His MLB career ended in 1965, as a pinch hitter for the Chicago Cubs. All told, Bright appeared in 309 MLB games over all or parts of eight seasons, batting .255 with 214 hits, 31 doubles, four triples, 32 homers and 126 RBI.

== Post-playing career ==
In 1967, Bright "resumed" his minor league managerial career in the Cubs' farm system after a 15-year hiatus, taking over the reins of the Quincy Cubs of the Class A Midwest League, a decade and a half after his stint as playing skipper of the Cubbies' Janesville affiliate. He later managed in the Kansas City Royals, Oakland Athletics, Milwaukee Brewers and Atlanta Braves organizations, and scouted for the Montreal Expos. He died in Sacramento at the age of 70.
