= Joe McClain =

American baseball player (born 1933)

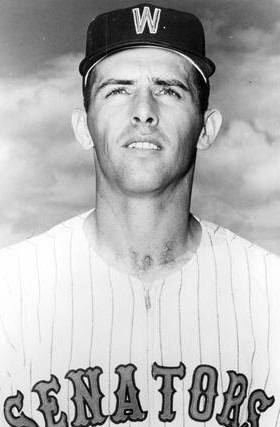
- Pitcher
- Born: May 5, 1933 (age 93); Johnson City, Tennessee, U.S.
- Batted: Right Threw: Right

MLB debut
- April 14, 1961, for the Washington Senators

Last MLB appearance
- June 1, 1962, for the Washington Senators

MLB statistics
- Win–loss record: 8–22
- Earned run average: 4.42
- Strikeouts: 82
- Stats at Baseball Reference

Teams
- Washington Senators (1961–1962)

Joseph Fred McClain (born May 5, 1933) is an American former Major League Baseball pitcher, who played for the Washington Senators in 1961–1962. McClain had the first victory in the history of the expansion franchise, which is now the Texas Rangers.

The right-hander stood 6 feet (1.8 m) tall and weighed 183 pounds (83 kg). After attending the University of Tennessee, he signed with the St. Louis Cardinals in 1953, spent the 1954–1955 seasons in the military, then bounced around the minor league systems of the Cardinals, New York Yankees and original Senators, now the Minnesota Twins. He was drafted by the expansion Senators in the minor league phase of the 1960 expansion draft.

In his MLB debut as a 27-year-old rookie, McClain pitched a complete game, seven-hit victory over the Cleveland Indians at Griffith Stadium on April 14, 1961 — the second regular-season game and the first win in the team's history. He spent the entire 1961 season as a starting pitcher for the Senators, leading the team in games started (29), tying for the lead in innings pitched (212) and shutouts (2), and posted a creditable 3.86 earned run average. His shutouts came on May 14 against the Boston Red Sox (a five-hitter) and July 7 against the Minnesota Twins (a three-hitter against the former Senator franchise). He registered seven complete games that season.

In 1962, he lost all four decisions and pitched only 24 innings (with no complete games) before being sent to the Triple-A Syracuse Chiefs. He pitched his last professional games in 1963.

In 236 MLB innings pitched, he permitted 254 hits and 59 bases on balls, with 82 strikeouts.
