= Jim Mahoney =

American baseball player (born 1934)

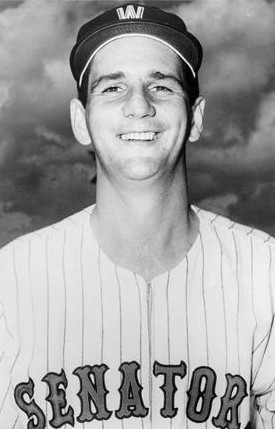
- Mahoney in 1961
- Shortstop
- Born: May 26, 1934 (age 91); Englewood, New Jersey, U.S.
- Batted: Right Threw: Right

MLB debut
- July 28, 1959, for the Boston Red Sox

Last MLB appearance
- June 14, 1965, for the Houston Astros

MLB statistics
- Batting average: .229
- Home runs: 4
- Runs batted in: 15
- Stats at Baseball Reference

Teams
- Boston Red Sox (1959); Washington Senators (1961); Cleveland Indians (1962); Houston Astros (1965)

James Thomas Mahoney (born May 26, 1934) is an American former Major League Baseball shortstop. He was signed by the Philadelphia Phillies before the 1953 season and played for the Boston Red Sox (1959), Washington Senators (1961), Cleveland Indians (1962) and Houston Astros (1965). The native of Englewood, New Jersey, threw and batted right-handed, stood 6 feet (1.8 m) tall and weighed 175 pounds (79 kg) during his active career.

Mahoney was the first player to appear as a pinch runner in modern Washington Senators history. On April 10, 1961, in the bottom of the ninth inning, he entered the game for second baseman Danny O'Connell, who had singled with one out. He reached second on an R. C. Stevens grounder to third, but did not score, as the next batter made the third out. The Senators lost to the Chicago White Sox, 4–3.

Other career highlights include:

- one 3-hit game...three singles and two runs scored in a 9–4 victory over the Detroit Tigers (May 11, 1961)
- a home run vs. the New York Yankees in front of 70,918 fans at Cleveland Stadium (June 17, 1962)
- hit a combined .381 (8-for-21) against All-Stars Eddie Fisher, Mike Fornieles, Mudcat Grant, and Dave Stenhouse

Mahoney had a career .966 fielding percentage and a batting average of .229 with 4 home runs, 15 RBI, and a slugging percentage of .314 in 210 at bats. He scored 32 runs in 120 games.

After his playing career, he was a Major League coach for the Chicago White Sox (1972–76) and Seattle Mariners (1985–86), and managed in the farm systems of the White Sox, Pittsburgh Pirates and Minnesota Twins.
