= 1963 Chicago White Sox season =

1963 Chicago White Sox
- League: American League
- Ballpark: White Sox Park
- City: Chicago
- Record: 94–68 (.580)
- League place: 2nd
- Owners: Arthur Allyn, Jr., John Allyn
- General managers: Ed Short
- Managers: Al López
- Television: WGN-TV (Jack Brickhouse, Vince Lloyd)
- Radio: WCFL (Bob Elson, Milo Hamilton)

The 1963 Chicago White Sox season was the team's 63rd season in the major leagues, and its 64th season overall. They finished with a record of 94–68, good enough for second place in the American League, 10 1/2 games behind the first-place New York Yankees.

== Offseason ==
- January 14, 1963: Luis Aparicio and Al Smith were traded by the White Sox to the Baltimore Orioles for Hoyt Wilhelm, Ron Hansen, Dave Nicholson, and Pete Ward.

== Regular season ==
=== Season standings ===
American League
Team	W	L	Pct.	GB	Home	Road
New York Yankees	104	57	.646	—	58‍–‍22	46‍–‍35
Chicago White Sox	94	68	.580	10½	49‍–‍33	45‍–‍35
Minnesota Twins	91	70	.565	13	48‍–‍33	43‍–‍37
Baltimore Orioles	86	76	.531	18½	48‍–‍33	38‍–‍43
Cleveland Indians	79	83	.488	25½	41‍–‍40	38‍–‍43
Detroit Tigers	79	83	.488	25½	47‍–‍34	32‍–‍49
Boston Red Sox	76	85	.472	28	44‍–‍36	32‍–‍49
Kansas City Athletics	73	89	.451	31½	36‍–‍45	37‍–‍44
Los Angeles Angels	70	91	.435	34	39‍–‍42	31‍–‍49
Washington Senators	56	106	.346	48½	31‍–‍49	25‍–‍57

=== Record vs. opponents ===
1963 American League record Sources:
Team	BAL	BOS	CWS	CLE	DET	KCA	LAA	MIN	NYY	WAS
Baltimore	—	7–11	7–11	10–8	13–5	9–9	9–9	9–9	7–11	15–3
Boston	11–7	—	8–10	10–8	9–9	7–11	9–8	7–11	6–12	9–9
Chicago	11–7	10–8	—	11–7	11–7	12–6	10–8	8–10	8–10	13–5
Cleveland	8–10	8–10	7–11	—	10–8	11–7	10–8	5–13	7–11	13–5
Detroit	5–13	9–9	7–11	8–10	—	13–5	12–6	8–10	8–10	9–9
Kansas City	9–9	11–7	6–12	7–11	5–13	—	10–8	9–9	6–12	10–8
Los Angeles	9–9	8–9	8–10	8–10	6–12	8–10	—	9–9	5–13	9–9
Minnesota	9–9	11–7	10–8	13–5	10–8	9–9	9–9	—	6–11	14–4
New York	11–7	12–6	10–8	11–7	10–8	12–6	13–5	11–6	—	14–4
Washington	3–15	9–9	5–13	5–13	9–9	8–10	9–9	4–14	4–14	—

=== Opening Day lineup ===
- Jim Landis, CF
- Nellie Fox, 2B
- Joe Cunningham, 1B
- Floyd Robinson, RF
- Pete Ward, 3B
- Dave Nicholson, LF
- Ron Hansen, SS
- J. C. Martin, C
- Ray Herbert, P

=== Notable transactions ===
- May 5, 1963: Dom Zanni was traded by the White Sox to the Cincinnati Reds for Jim Brosnan.
- May 9, 1963: Sammy Esposito was released by the White Sox.

=== Roster ===
1963 Chicago White Sox
Roster
Pitchers: 18 Fritz Ackley; 38 Frank Baumann; 27 Jim Brosnan; 30 John Buzhardt; 22 Dave DeBusschere; 28 Eddie Fisher; 21 Ray Herbert; 20 Joe Horlen; 36 Bruce Howard; 23 Mike Joyce; 27 Frank Kreutzer; 43 Gary Peters; 27 Taylor Phillips; 32 Juan Pizarro; 19 Joe Shipley; 35 Fred Talbot; 31 Hoyt Wilhelm; 19 Dom Zanni	Catchers: 45 Cam Carreon; 10 Sherm Lollar; 12 J. C. Martin; Infielders: 24 Don Buford; 5 Joe Cunningham; 2 Nellie Fox; 4 Ron Hansen; 50 Deacon Jones; 25 Jim Lemon; 14 Tommy McCraw; 9 Charley Smith; 8 Pete Ward; 6 Al Weis	Outfielders: 17 Ken Berry; 40 Mike Hershberger; 1 Jim Landis; 7 Charlie Maxwell; 16 Brian McCall; 11 Dave Nicholson; 3 Floyd Robinson; 26 Gene Stephens; Other batters: 14 Sammy Esposito	Manager: 42 Al López; Coaches: 37 Ray Berres; 34 Johnny Cooney; 33 Tony Cuccinello; 39 Don Gutteridge

== Game log ==
=== Regular season ===
Legend
	White Sox win
	White Sox loss
	Postponement
	Eliminated from playoff race
**Bold**	White Sox team member

1963 regular season game log: 94–68 (Home: 49–33; Away: 45–35)
April: 7–7 (Home: 4–2; Away: 3–5)

#	Date	Time (CT)	Opponent	Score	Win	Loss	Save	Time of Game	Attendance	Record	Streak

May: 20–12 (Home: 12–6; Away: 8–6)

#	Date	Time (CT)	Opponent	Score	Win	Loss	Save	Time of Game	Attendance	Record	Streak

June: 18–14 (Home: 10–8; Away: 8–6)

#	Date	Time (CT)	Opponent	Score	Win	Loss	Save	Time of Game	Attendance	Record	Streak

July: 14–13 (Home: 5–4; Away: 9–9)

#	Date	Time (CT)	Opponent	Score	Win	Loss	Save	Time of Game	Attendance	Record	Streak
—	July 9	1:00 p.m. CDT	**34th All-Star Game in Cleveland, OH**								

August: 17–13 (Home: 5–6; Away: 12–7)

#	Date	Time (CT)	Opponent	Score	Win	Loss	Save	Time of Game	Attendance	Record	Streak

September: 18–9 (Home: 12–7; Away: 6–2)

#	Date	Time (CT)	Opponent	Score	Win	Loss	Save	Time of Game	Attendance	Record	Streak

== Player stats ==
=== Batting ===
Note: G = Games played; AB = At bats; R = Runs scored; H = Hits; 2B = Doubles; 3B = Triples; HR = Home runs; RBI = Runs batted in; BB = Base on balls; SO = Strikeouts; AVG = Batting average; SB = Stolen bases

Player	G	AB	R	H	2B	3B	HR	RBI	BB	SO	AVG	SB
Ken Berry, CF	4	5	2	1	0	0	0	0	1	1	.200	0
Don Buford, 3B, 2B	12	42	9	12	1	2	0	5	5	7	.286	1
Cam Carreon, C	101	270	28	74	10	1	2	35	23	32	.274	1
Joe Cunningham, 1B	67	210	32	60	12	1	1	31	33	23	.286	1
Sammy Esposito, PR	1	0	0	0	0	0	0	0	0	0	.000	0
Nellie Fox, 2B	137	539	54	140	19	0	2	42	24	17	.260	0
Ron Hansen, SS	144	482	55	109	17	2	13	67	78	74	.226	1
Mike Hershberger, CF, RF	135	476	64	133	26	2	3	45	39	39	.279	9
Deacon Jones, 1B	17	16	4	3	0	1	1	2	2	2	.188	0
Jim Landis, CF	133	396	56	89	6	6	13	45	47	75	.225	8
Jim Lemon, 1B	36	80	4	16	0	1	1	8	12	32	.200	0
Sherm Lollar, C	35	73	4	17	4	0	0	6	8	7	.233	0
J. C. Martin, C	105	259	25	53	11	1	5	28	26	35	.205	0
Charlie Maxwell, LF, 1B	71	130	17	30	4	2	3	17	31	27	.231	0
Brian McCall, RF	3	7	1	0	0	0	0	0	1	2	.000	0
Tommy McCraw, 1B	102	280	38	71	11	3	6	33	21	46	.254	15
Dave Nicholson, LF	126	449	53	103	11	4	22	70	63	175	.229	2
Floyd Robinson, RF, LF	146	527	71	149	21	6	13	71	62	43	.283	4
Charley Smith, SS	4	7	0	2	0	1	0	1	0	2	.286	0
Gene Stephens, RF, LF	6	18	5	7	0	0	1	2	1	3	.389	0
Pete Ward, 3B	157	600	80	177	34	6	22	84	52	77	.295	7
Al Weis, 2B, SS	99	210	41	57	9	0	0	18	18	37	.271	15

Player	G	AB	R	H	2B	3B	HR	RBI	BB	SO	AVG	SB
Fritz Ackley, P	2	5	0	1	0	0	0	0	0	4	.200	0
Frank Baumann, P	24	11	1	1	0	0	0	0	1	2	.091	0
Jim Brosnan, P	45	13	0	4	0	0	0	0	0	4	.308	0
John Buzhardt, P	20	48	2	4	2	0	0	1	0	20	.083	0
Dave DeBusschere, P	24	22	1	1	0	0	0	0	1	9	.045	0
Eddie Fisher, P	33	36	2	5	0	0	0	0	2	15	.139	0
Ray Herbert, P	33	63	7	14	4	0	1	10	9	18	.222	0
Joe Horlen, P	33	40	2	9	0	0	0	3	1	9	.225	0
Bruce Howard, P	7	4	0	1	0	0	0	0	0	1	.250	0
Mike Joyce, P	2	0	0	0	0	0	0	0	0	0	.000	0
Frank Kreutzer, P	1	2	0	0	0	0	0	0	0	0	.000	0
Gary Peters, P	50	81	12	21	4	1	3	12	3	19	.259	0
Taylor Phillips, P	9	2	0	0	0	0	0	0	0	1	.000	0
Juan Pizarro, P	32	73	10	13	2	0	2	10	3	26	.178	0
Joe Shipley, P	3	2	0	0	0	0	0	0	0	1	.000	0
Fred Talbot, P	1	1	0	0	0	0	0	0	0	0	.000	0
Hoyt Wilhelm, P	55	29	3	2	0	0	0	2	4	11	.069	0
Team totals	162	5508	683	1379	208	40	114	648	571	896	.250	64

=== Pitching ===
Note: W = Wins; L = Losses; ERA = Earned run average; G = Games pitched; GS = Games started; SV = Saves; IP = Innings pitched; H = Hits allowed; R = Runs allowed; ER = Earned runs allowed; HR = Home runs allowed; BB = Walks allowed; K = Strikeouts

Player	W	L	ERA	G	GS	SV	IP	H	R	ER	HR	BB	K
Fritz Ackley	1	0	2.08	2	2	0	13.0	7	4	3	2	7	11
Frank Baumann	2	1	3.04	24	1	1	50.1	52	22	17	2	19	31
Jim Brosnan	3	8	2.84	45	0	14	73.0	71	24	23	7	27	46
John Buzhardt	9	4	2.42	19	18	0	126.1	100	35	34	8	36	59
Dave DeBusschere	3	4	3.09	24	10	0	84.1	80	35	29	9	35	53
Eddie Fisher	9	8	3.95	33	15	0	120.2	114	57	53	14	30	67
Ray Herbert	13	10	3.24	33	33	0	224.2	230	86	81	12	40	105
Joe Horlen	11	7	3.27	33	21	0	124.0	122	50	45	10	63	61
Bruce Howard	2	1	2.65	7	0	1	17.0	12	7	5	0	14	9
Mike Joyce	0	0	8.44	6	0	0	10.2	13	10	10	1	10	7
Frank Kreutzer	1	0	1.80	1	1	0	5.0	3	1	1	1	1	0
Gary Peters	19	8	2.33	41	30	1	243.0	192	69	63	9	70	189
Taylor Phillips	0	0	10.29	9	0	0	14.0	16	16	16	2	18	13
Juan Pizarro	16	8	2.39	32	28	1	214.2	177	69	57	14	64	163
Joe Shipley	0	1	5.79	3	0	0	4.2	9	7	3	0	6	3
Fred Talbot	0	0	3.00	1	0	0	3.0	2	1	1	0	4	2
Hoyt Wilhelm	5	8	2.64	55	3	21	136.1	106	47	40	8	31	111
Dom Zanni	0	0	8.31	5	0	0	4.1	5	4	4	1	4	2
Team totals	94	68	2.97	162	162	39	1469.0	1311	544	485	100	479	932

== Awards and honors ==
All-Star Game

- Nellie Fox, reserve
- Juan Pizarro, reserve

== Farm system ==
Level	Team	League	Manager
AAA	Indianapolis Indians	International League	Rollie Hemsley
AA	Lynchburg White Sox	Sally League	Les Moss
A	Sarasota Sun Sox	Florida State League	Ira Hutchinson
A	Clinton C-Sox	Midwest League	Don Bacon
A	Eugene Emeralds	Northwest League	George Noga and Chips Sobek
Rookie	Middlesboro Cubsox	Appalachian League	Ripper Collins, Hugh Mulcahy and George Noga

LEAGUE CHAMPIONS: Indianapolis, Sarasota, Clinton

Middlesboro affiliation shared with Chicago Cubs
