= 1962 Chicago White Sox season =

1962 Chicago White Sox
- League: American League
- Ballpark: White Sox Park
- City: Chicago
- Record: 85–77 (.525)
- League place: 5th
- Owners: Arthur Allyn, Jr., John Allyn
- General managers: Ed Short
- Managers: Al López
- Television: WGN-TV (Jack Brickhouse, Vince Lloyd)
- Radio: WCFL (Bob Elson, Milo Hamilton)

The 1962 Chicago White Sox season was the team's 62nd season in the major leagues, and its 63rd season overall. They finished with a record of 85–77, which was good enough for fifth place in the American League, 11 games behind the first-place New York Yankees.

== Offseason ==
- November 27, 1961: Minnie Miñoso was traded by the White Sox to the St. Louis Cardinals for Joe Cunningham.
- November 28, 1961: Roy Sievers was traded by the White Sox to the Philadelphia Phillies for Charley Smith and John Buzhardt.
- March 24, 1962: Andy Carey was traded by the White Sox to the Los Angeles Dodgers for Ramón Conde and Jim Koranda (minors).
- Prior to 1962 season: Future basketball star Dave DeBusschere was signed as an amateur free agent by the White Sox.

== Regular season ==
- April 22, 1962: Dave DeBusschere made his major league baseball debut in a game against the Kansas City Athletics. He pitched one inning and gave up one walk.

=== Opening Day lineup ===
- Luis Aparicio, SS
- Nellie Fox, 2B
- Joe Cunningham, 1B
- Floyd Robinson, RF
- Al Smith, LF
- Mike Hershberger, CF
- Charley Smith, 3B
- Sherm Lollar, C
- Juan Pizarro, P

=== Season standings ===
American League
Team	W	L	Pct.	GB	Home	Road
New York Yankees	96	66	.593	—	50‍–‍30	46‍–‍36
Minnesota Twins	91	71	.562	5	45‍–‍36	46‍–‍35
Los Angeles Angels	86	76	.531	10	40‍–‍41	46‍–‍35
Detroit Tigers	85	76	.528	10½	49‍–‍33	36‍–‍43
Chicago White Sox	85	77	.525	11	43‍–‍38	42‍–‍39
Cleveland Indians	80	82	.494	16	43‍–‍38	37‍–‍44
Baltimore Orioles	77	85	.475	19	44‍–‍38	33‍–‍47
Boston Red Sox	76	84	.475	19	39‍–‍40	37‍–‍44
Kansas City Athletics	72	90	.444	24	39‍–‍42	33‍–‍48
Washington Senators	60	101	.373	35½	27‍–‍53	33‍–‍48

=== Record vs. opponents ===
1962 American League record Sources:
Team	BAL	BOS	CWS	CLE	DET	KCA	LAA	MIN	NYY	WAS
Baltimore	—	8–10	9–9	11–7	2–16	10–8	8–10	6–12	11–7	12–6
Boston	10–8	—	8–10	7–11	11–6	10–8	6–12	10–8	6–12	8–9
Chicago	9–9	10–8	—	12–6	9–9	9–9	10–8	8–10	8–10	10–8
Cleveland	7–11	11–7	6–12	—	10–8	11–7	9–9	6–12	11–7	9–9
Detroit	16–2	6–11	9–9	8–10	—	12–6	11–7	5–13	7–11	11–7
Kansas City	8–10	8–10	9–9	7–11	6–12	—	6–12	8–10	5–13	15–3
Los Angeles	10–8	12–6	8–10	9–9	7–11	12–6	—	9–9	8–10	11–7
Minnesota	12–6	8–10	10–8	12–6	13–5	10–8	9–9	—	7–11	10–8–1
New York	7–11	12–6	10–8	7–11	11–7	13–5	10–8	11–7	—	15–3
Washington	6–12	9–8	8–10	9–9	7–11	3–15	7–11	8–10–1	3–15	—

=== Roster ===
1962 Chicago White Sox
Roster
Pitchers: 38 Frank Baumann; 30 John Buzhardt; 22 Dave DeBusschere; 36 Mike DeGerick; 28 Eddie Fisher; 21 Ray Herbert; 20 Joe Horlen; 23 Mike Joyce; 44 Russ Kemmerer; 29 Frank Kreutzer; 27 Turk Lown; 23 Gary Peters; 32 Juan Pizarro; 18 Herb Score; 44 Dean Stone; 41 Verle Tiefenthaler; 24 Early Wynn; 19 Dom Zanni	Catchers: 45 Cam Carreon; 10 Sherm Lollar; 12 J. C. Martin; 31 Bob Roselli; Infielders: 11 Luis Aparicio; 9 Ramón Conde; 5 Joe Cunningham; 14 Sammy Esposito; 7 Bob Farley; 2 Nellie Fox; 20,50 Deacon Jones; 25 Dick Kenworthy; 15 Bob Sadowski; 16 Al Smith; 9 Charley Smith; 6 Al Weis	Outfielders: 4 Ken Berry; 40 Mike Hershberger; 1 Jim Landis; 7 Charlie Maxwell; 8 Brian McCall; 3 Floyd Robinson	Manager: 42 Al López; Coaches: 37 Ray Berres; 34 Johnny Cooney; 33 Tony Cuccinello; 39 Don Gutteridge

== Player stats ==
= Indicates league leader

=== Batting ===
Note: G=Games played; AB=At bats; R=Runs scored; H=Hits; 2B=Doubles; 3B=Triples; HR=Home runs; RBI=Runs batted in; BB=Base on balls; SO=Strikeouts; AVG=Batting average; SB=Stolen bases

Player	G	AB	R	H	2B	3B	HR	RBI	BB	SO	AVG	SB
Luis Aparicio, SS	153	581	72	140	23	5	7	40	32	36	.241	31
Ken Berry, OF	3	6	2	2	0	0	0	0	0	0	.333	0
Cam Carreon, C	106	313	31	80	19	1	4	37	33	37	.256	1
Ramón Conde, 3B	14	16	0	0	0	0	0	1	3	3	.000	0
Joe Cunningham, 1B, RF	149	526	91	155	32	7	8	70	101	59	.295	3
Sammy Esposito, SS, 3B	75	81	14	19	1	0	0	4	17	13	.235	0
Bob Farley, 1B	35	53	7	10	1	1	1	4	13	13	.189	0
Nellie Fox, 2B	157	621	79	166	27	7	2	54	38	12	.267	1
Mike Hershberger, RF, CF	148	427	54	112	14	2	4	46	37	36	.262	10
Deacon Jones, 1B	18	28	3	9	2	0	0	8	4	6	.321	0
Dick Kenworthy, 2B	3	4	0	0	0	0	0	0	0	3	.000	0
Jim Landis, CF	149	534	82	122	21	6	15	61	80	105	.228	19
Sherm Lollar, C	84	220	17	59	12	0	2	26	32	23	.268	1
J. C. Martin, C	18	26	0	2	0	0	0	2	0	3	.077	0
Charlie Maxwell, LF, RF, 1B	69	206	30	61	8	3	9	43	34	32	.296	0
Brian McCall, CF	4	8	2	3	0	0	2	3	0	2	.375	0
Floyd Robinson, LF, RF	156	600	89	187	45	10	11	109	72	47	.312	4
Bob Roselli, C	35	64	4	12	3	1	1	5	11	15	.188	1
Bob Sadowski, 3B, 2B	79	130	22	30	3	3	6	24	13	22	.231	0
Al Smith, 3B, LF	142	511	62	149	23	8	16	82	57	60	.292	3
Charley Smith, 3B	65	145	11	30	4	0	2	17	9	32	.207	0
Al Weis, SS	7	12	2	1	0	0	0	0	2	3	.083	1

Player	G	AB	R	H	2B	3B	HR	RBI	BB	SO	AVG	SB
Frank Baumann, P	40	30	3	8	2	1	0	4	6	9	.267	0
John Buzhardt, P	28	51	2	6	0	0	0	1	2	22	.118	0
Eddie Fisher, P	57	46	2	6	2	1	0	2	2	12	.130	0
Ray Herbert, P	35	82	6	16	5	0	2	9	5	16	.195	0
Joe Horlen, P	20	38	1	2	0	0	0	0	2	11	.053	0
Mike Joyce, P	25	7	1	3	0	0	0	0	0	2	.429	0
Russ Kemmerer, P	20	2	1	1	0	0	0	0	1	1	.500	0
Turk Lown, P	42	3	0	0	0	0	0	0	0	1	.000	0
Juan Pizarro, P	37	69	10	11	1	0	0	5	4	17	.159	0
Dean Stone, P	27	2	0	1	1	0	0	0	0	1	.500	0
Early Wynn, P	27	54	5	7	1	0	0	2	7	17	.130	0
Dom Zanni, P	44	18	2	5	0	0	0	3	3	3	.278	1
Team totals	162	5514	707	1415	250	56	92	662	620	674	.257	76

=== Pitching ===
Note: W=Wins; L=Losses; ERA=Earned run average; G=Games pitched; GS=Games started; SV=Saves; IP=Innings pitched; H=Hits allowed; R=Runs allowed; ER=Earned runs allowed; HR=Home runs allowed; BB=Walks allowed; K=Strikeouts

Player	W	L	ERA	G	GS	SV	IP	H	R	ER	HR	BB	K
Frank Baumann	7	6	3.38	40	10	4	119.2	117	46	45	10	41	55
John Buzhardt	8	12	4.19	28	25	0	152.1	156	75	71	16	62	64
Dave DeBusschere	0	0	2.00	12	0	0	18.0	5	7	4	1	24	8
Mike DeGerick	0	0	0.00	1	1	0	1.0	1	0	0	0	1	0
Eddie Fisher	9	5	3.10	57	12	5	182.2	169	74	63	17	46	88
Ray Herbert	20	9	3.27	35	35	0	236.2	228	90	86	13	78	115
Joe Horlen	7	6	4.89	20	19	0	108.2	108	62	59	10	45	63
Mike Joyce	2	1	3.32	25	1	2	43.1	40	17	16	2	16	9
Russ Kemmerer	2	1	3.86	20	0	0	28.0	30	14	12	3	12	17
Frank Kreutzer	0	0	0.00	1	0	0	1.1	0	0	0	0	1	1
Turk Lown	4	2	3.04	42	0	6	56.1	58	21	19	3	30	40
Gary Peters	0	1	5.68	5	0	0	6.1	8	5	4	0	1	4
Juan Pizarro	12	14	3.81	36	32	1	203.1	182	97	86	16	100	173
Herb Score	0	0	4.50	4	0	0	6.0	6	3	3	1	4	3
Dean Stone	1	0	3.26	27	0	5	30.1	28	11	11	3	11	23
Verle Tiefenthaler	0	0	9.82	3	0	0	3.2	6	4	4	1	7	1
Early Wynn	7	15	4.46	27	26	0	167.2	171	90	83	15	62	91
Dom Zanni	6	5	3.75	44	2	5	86.1	67	42	36	12	34	66
Team totals	85	77	3.73	162	162	28	1451.2	1380	658	602	123	575	821

== Farm system ==
Level	Team	League	Manager
AAA	Indianapolis Indians	American Association	Luke Appling
A	Savannah/Lynchburg White Sox	Sally League	Les Moss
C	Visalia White Sox	California League	Dick Kinaman
D	Harlan Smokies	Appalachian League	Chips Sobek and Lamar North
D	Sarasota Sun Sox	Florida State League	George Noga
D	Clinton C-Sox	Midwest League	Ira Hutchinson

Savannah franchise moved to Lynchburg, August 26, 1962; Harlan affiliation shared with New York Yankees
