= List of Chicago White Sox Opening Day starting pitchers =

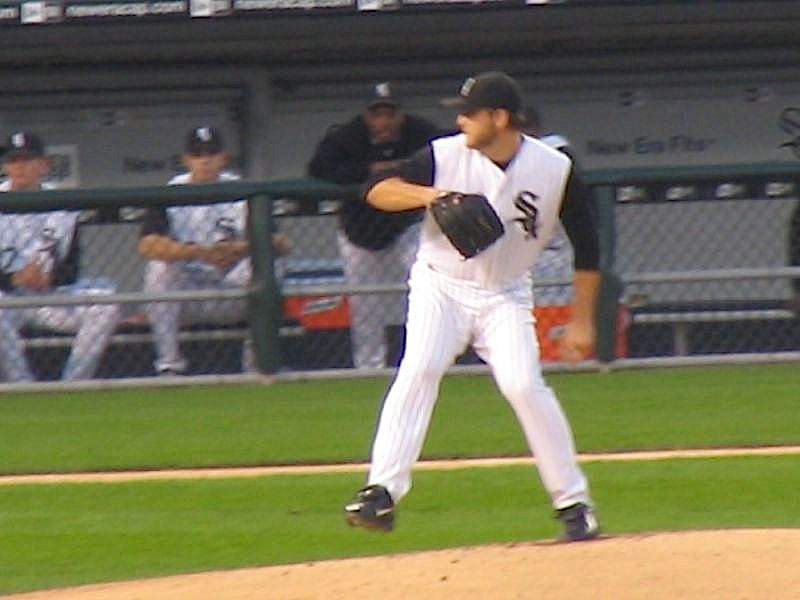
Mark Buehrle has made nine Opening Day starts for the Chicago White Sox, including in 2010.

The Chicago White Sox are a Major League Baseball franchise based in Chicago. They play in the American League Central division. The White Sox have used 62 Opening Day starting pitchers since they were established as a Major League team in 1901. The first game of the new baseball season for a team is played on Opening Day, and being named the Opening Day starter is an honor, which is often given to the player who is expected to lead the pitching staff that season, though there are various strategic reasons why a team's best pitcher might not start on Opening Day. The White Sox have a record of 60 wins and 53 losses in their Opening Day games, through the 2013 season.

The White Sox have played in three different home ball parks. They played at South Side Park from 1901 through the middle of 1910, the first Comiskey Park from 1910 through 1990, and have played at the second Comiskey Park, now known as U.S. Cellular Field, since 1991. They had a record of four wins and two losses in Opening Day games at South Side Park, 18 wins and 19 losses at the first Comiskey Park and four wins and one loss at U.S. Cellular Field, for a total home record in Opening Day games of 27 wins and 22 losses. Their record in Opening Day away games is 33 wins and 31 losses.

Mark Buehrle holds the record for making the most Opening Day starts for the White Sox, with nine. Billy Pierce had seven Opening Day starts for the White Sox, Wilbur Wood had five, Tommy Thomas and Jack McDowell each had four, and Frank Smith, Jim Scott, Lefty Williams, Sad Sam Jones, Bill Dietrich, Gary Peters and Tommy John each had three. Several Baseball Hall of Famers have made Opening Day starts for the White Sox, including Ed Walsh, Red Faber, Ted Lyons, Early Wynn and Tom Seaver.

The White Sox have played in the World Series five times. They won in 1906, 1917 and 2005, and lost in 1919 and 1959. Frank Owen was the Opening Day starting pitcher in 1906, Williams in 1917 and 1919, Pierce in 1959 and Buehrle in 2005. The White Sox won all five Opening Day games in those seasons.

In addition to being the White Sox' Opening Day starter in 1917 and 1919, Williams was also the Opening Day starter in 1920. However, he was suspended from the team later in the season and then banned from baseball for life for his role in throwing the 1919 World Series. Ed Cicotte, who had been the White Sox' 1918 Opening Day starter, was also banned from baseball as a result of his actions during the 1919 World Series. Ken Brett's Opening Day start on April 7, 1977, against the Toronto Blue Jays was the first game in Blue Jays' history. The Blue Jays won the game 9–5.

== Key ==
Key
Season	Each year is linked to an article about that particular White Sox season.
W	Win
L	Loss
T	Tie game
ND (W)	No decision by starting pitcher; White Sox won game
ND (L)	No decision by starting pitcher; White Sox lost game
(W)	White Sox won game; no information on starting pitcher's decision
(L)	White Sox lost game; no information on starting pitcher's decision
Final score	Game score with White Sox runs listed first
Location	Stadium in italics for home game
(#)	Number of appearances as Opening Day starter with the White Sox
*	White Sox advanced to the post-season
**	White Sox were American League Champions
†	White Sox were World Series Champions

== Pitchers ==
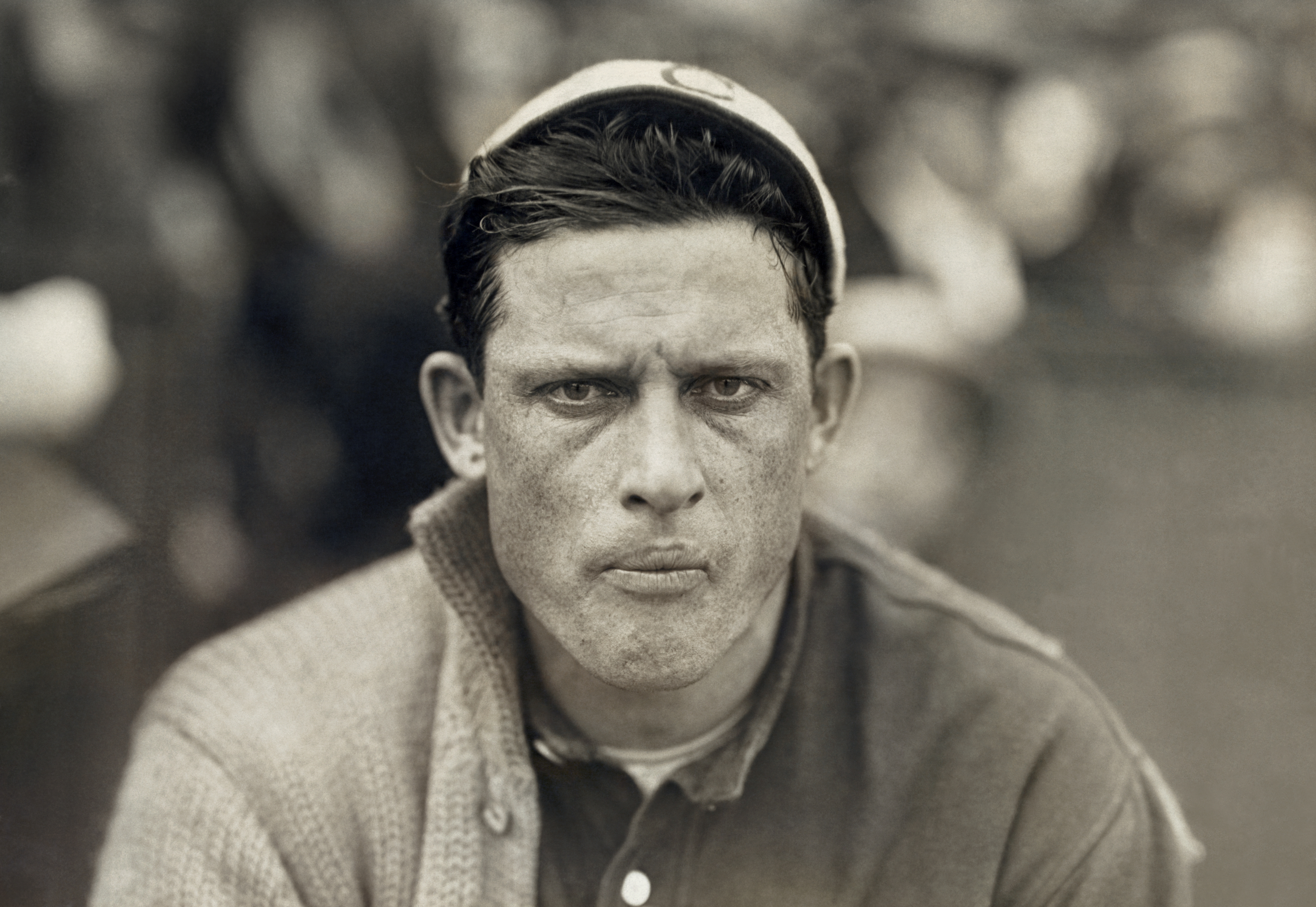
Hall of Famer Ed Walsh made two Opening Day starts for the White Sox.

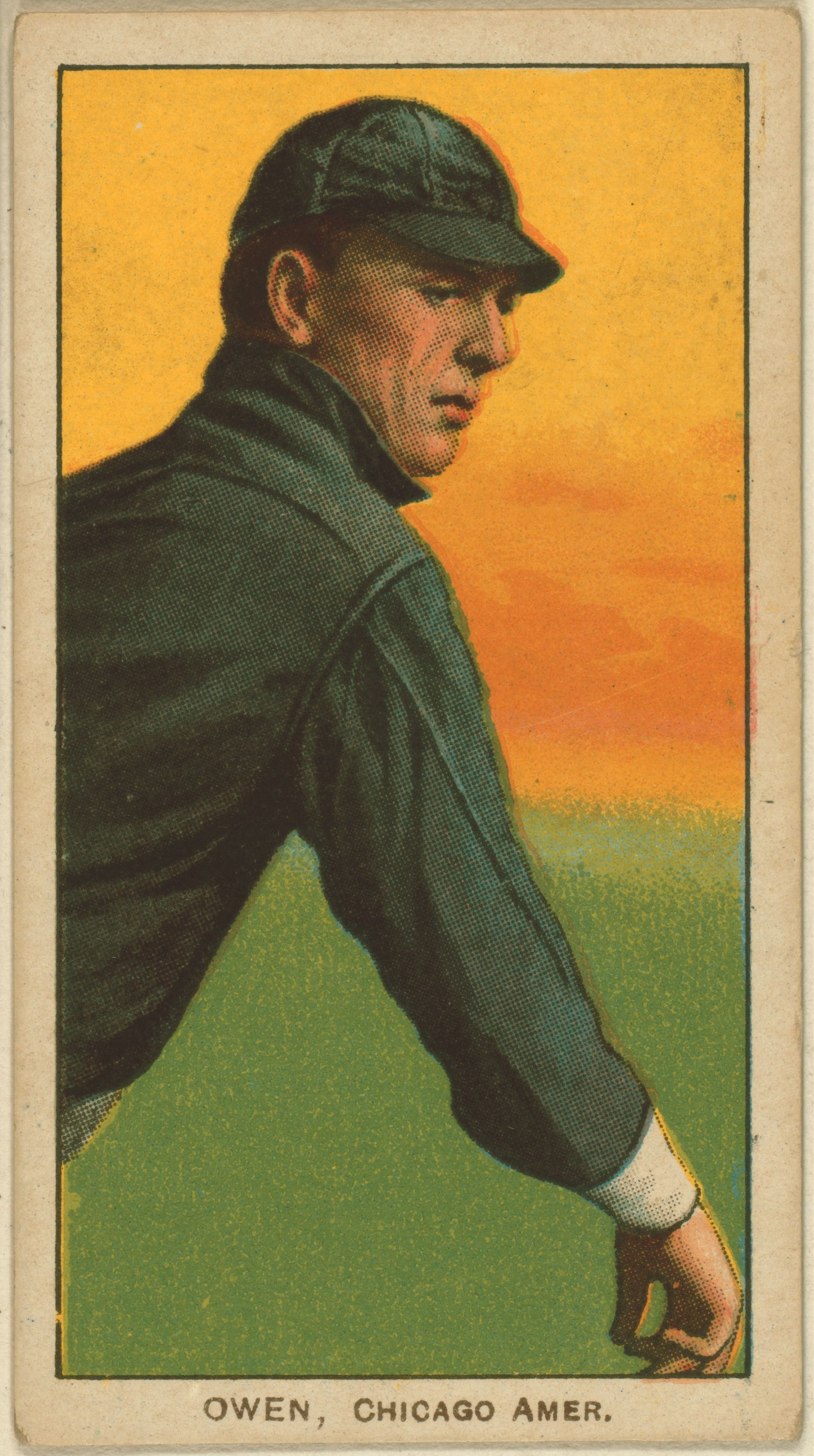
Frank Owen was the White Sox' Opening Day starter in 1906, the season they won their first World Series title.

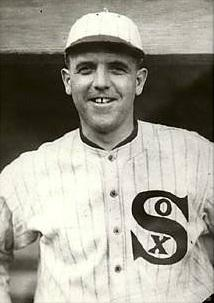
Ed Cicotte was the White Sox' Opening Day starting pitcher in 1918, and was later banned from baseball for his role in the Black Sox scandal.

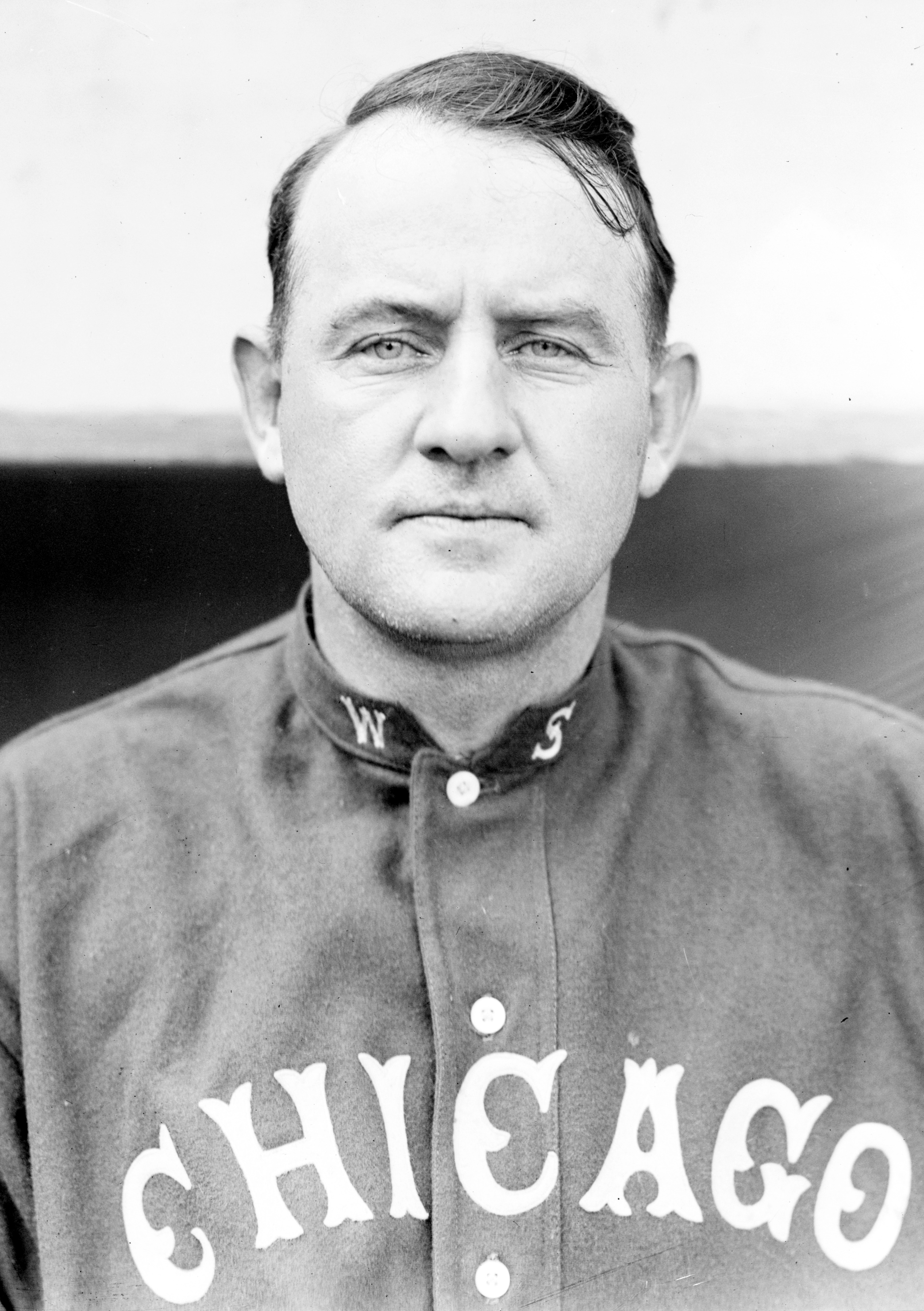
Nixey Callahan was the White Sox Opening Day starting pitcher in 1902.

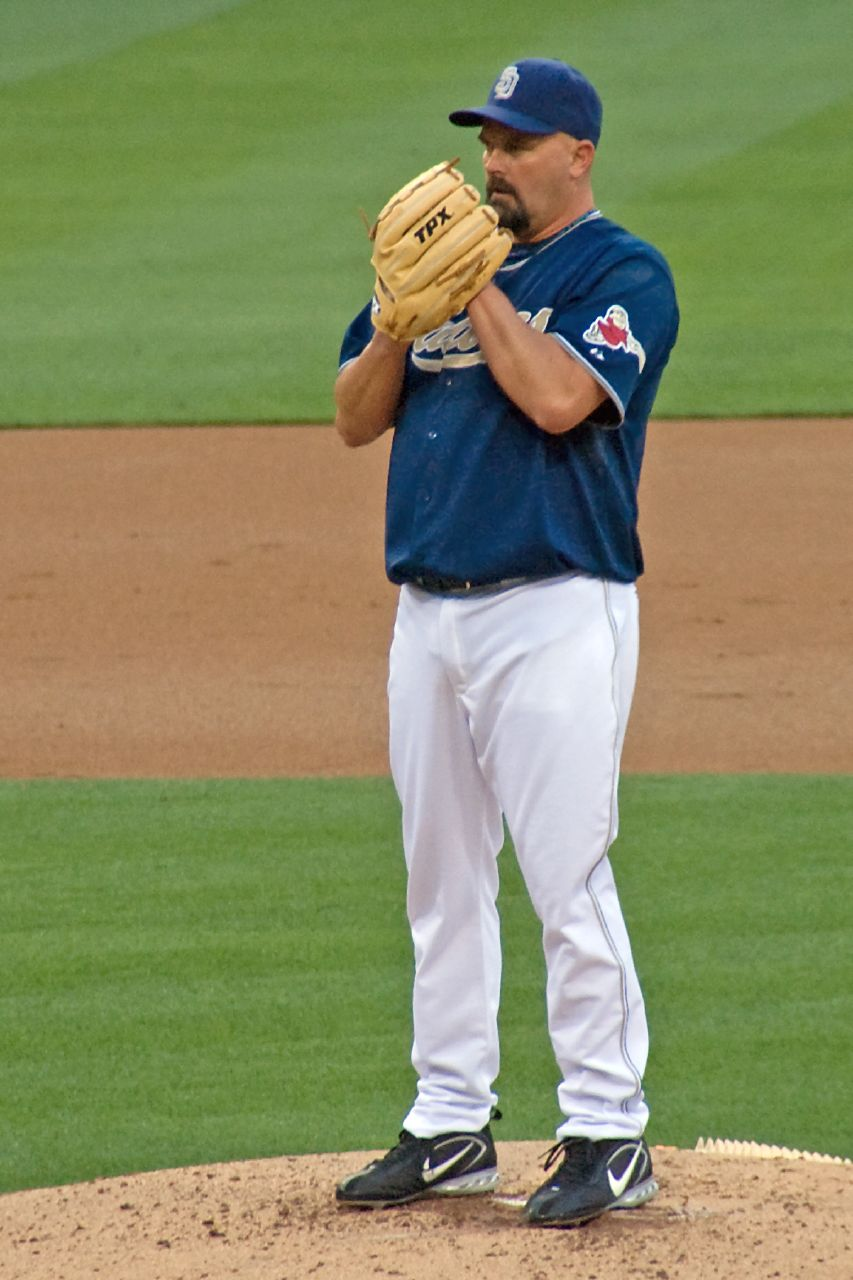
David Wells was the White Sox' Opening Day starter in 2001, his only season with the team.

Pitchers
Season	Pitcher	Decision	Final score	Opponent	Location	Ref(s)
1901**	Roy Patterson	(W)	8–2	Cleveland Indians	South Side Park	
1902	Nixey Callahan	(W)	12–2	Detroit Tigers	South Side Park	
1903	Patsy Flaherty	(W)	14–4	St. Louis Browns	Sportsman's Park	
1904	Frank Owen	(L)	1–6	Cleveland Indians	South Side Park	
1905	Frank Smith	(L)	1–2	St. Louis Browns	South Side Park	
1906†	Frank Owen (2)	(W)	5–3	Detroit Tigers	Bennett Park	
1907	Nick Altrock	(L)	0–1	St. Louis Browns	Sportsman's Park	
1908	Doc White	(W)	15–8	Detroit Tigers	South Side Park	
1909	Frank Smith (2)	(L)	0–2	Detroit Tigers	Bennett Park	
1910	Frank Smith (3)	(W)	3–0	St. Louis Browns	South Side Park	
1911	Ed Walsh	(L)	2–4	Detroit Tigers	Bennett Park	
1912	Ed Walsh (2)	(W)	6–2	St. Louis Browns	Comiskey Park	
1913	Jim Scott	(L)	1–3	Cleveland Indians	League Park	
1914	Jim Scott (2)	(W)	5–2	Cleveland Indians	Comiskey Park	
1915	Jim Scott (3)	(W)	7–6	St. Louis Browns	Sportsman's Park	
1916	Reb Russell	(L)	0–4	Detroit Tigers	Comiskey Park	
1917†	Lefty Williams	(W)	7–2	St. Louis Browns	Sportsman's Park	
1918	Ed Cicotte	(L)	1–6	St. Louis Browns	Comiskey Park	
1919**	Lefty Williams (2)	(W)	13–4	St. Louis Browns	Sportsman's Park	
1920	Lefty Williams (3)	W	3–2	Detroit Tigers	Comiskey Park	
1921	Dickie Kerr	ND (L)	5–6	Detroit Tigers	Navin Field	
1922	Red Faber	L	2–3	St. Louis Browns	Comiskey Park	
1923	Red Faber (2)	ND (L)	5–6	Cleveland Indians	League Park	
1924	Charlie Robertson	W	3–7	St. Louis Browns	Comiskey Park	
1925	Sloppy Thurston	L	3–4	Detroit Tigers	Navin Field	
1926	Ted Lyons	W	5–1	St. Louis Browns	Comiskey Park	
1927	Tommy Thomas	(L)	2–3	Cleveland Indians	League Park	
1928	Ted Lyons (2)	(L)	2–8	Cleveland Indians	Comiskey Park	
1929	Tommy Thomas (2)	(L)	1–3	St. Louis Browns	Sportsman's Park	
1930	Tommy Thomas (3)	ND (W)	8–7	Cleveland Indians	Comiskey Park	
1931	Tommy Thomas (4)	(L)	4–5	Cleveland Indians	League Park	
1932	Sam Jones	W	9–2	St. Louis Browns	Comiskey Park	
1933	Ed Durham	W	4–2	St. Louis Browns	Sportsman's Park	
1934	Sam Jones (2)	(L)	3–8	Detroit Tigers	Comiskey Park	
1935	Sam Jones (3)	W	7–6	Detroit Tigers	Navin Field	
1936	John Whitehead	W	7–6	St. Louis Browns	Comiskey Park	
1937	Vern Kennedy	(L)	10–15	St. Louis Browns	Sportsman's Park	
1938	John Whitehead (2)	W	4–3	Detroit Tigers	Comiskey Park	
1939	Johnny Rigney	(L)	1–6	Detroit Tigers	Briggs Stadium	
1940	Eddie Smith	(L)	0–1	Cleveland Indians	Comiskey Park	
1941	Bill Dietrich	W	4–3	Cleveland Indians	Cleveland Stadium	
1942	Johnny Rigney (2)	(L)	0–3	St. Louis Browns	Comiskey Park	
1943	Bill Dietrich (2)	(L)	0–3	St. Louis Browns	Sportsman's Park	
1944	Orval Grove	W	3–1	Cleveland Indians	Comiskey Park	
1945	Thornton Lee	W	5–2	Cleveland Indians	Cleveland Stadium	
1946	Bill Dietrich (3)	(L)	0–1	Cleveland Indians	Comiskey Park	
1947	Ed Lopat	W	2–0	Cleveland Indians	Cleveland Stadium	
1948	Joe Haynes	(L)	2–5	Detroit Tigers	Comiskey Park	
1949	Al Gettel	(L)	1–5	Detroit Tigers	Briggs Stadium	
1950	Bill Wight	(L)	3–5	St. Louis Browns	Comiskey Park	
1951	Billy Pierce	W	17–3	St. Louis Browns	Sportsman's Park	
1952	Billy Pierce (2)	(L)	2–3	Cleveland Indians	Comiskey Park	
1953	Saul Rogovin	(L)	0–6	Cleveland Indians	Cleveland Stadium	
1954	Billy Pierce (3)	L	2–8	Cleveland Indians	Comiskey Park	
1955	Virgil Trucks	L	1–5	Cleveland Indians	Cleveland Stadium	
1956	Billy Pierce (4)	W	2–1	Cleveland Indians	Comiskey Park	
1957	Billy Pierce (5)	W	3–2	Cleveland Indians	Cleveland Stadium	
1958	Billy Pierce (6)	L	3–4	Detroit Tigers	Comiskey Park	
1959**	Billy Pierce (7)	ND (W)	9–7	Detroit Tigers	Briggs Stadium	
1960	Early Wynn	ND (W)	10–9	Kansas City Athletics	Comiskey Park	
1961	Early Wynn (2)	ND (W)	4–3	Washington Senators	Griffith Stadium	
1962	Juan Pizarro	W	2–1	Los Angeles Angels	Comiskey Park	
1963	Ray Herbert	ND (W)	7–5	Detroit Tigers	Tiger Stadium	
1964	Gary Peters	ND (L)	3–5	Baltimore Orioles	Comiskey Park	
1965	Gary Peters (2)	W	5–3	Baltimore Orioles	Memorial Stadium	
1966	Tommy John	ND (W)	3–2	California Angels	Comiskey Park	
1967	John Buzhardt	L	4–5	Boston Red Sox	Fenway Park	
1968	Joe Horlen	L	0–9	Cleveland Indians	Comiskey Park	
1969	Gary Peters (3)	L	2–5	Oakland Athletics	Oakland Coliseum	
1970	Tommy John (2)	L	0–12	Minnesota Twins	Comiskey Park	
1971	Tommy John (3)	W	6–5	Oakland Athletics	Oakland Coliseum	
1972	Wilbur Wood	ND (L)	1–2	Kansas City Royals	Municipal Stadium	
1973	Wilbur Wood (2)	W	3–1	Texas Rangers	Arlington Stadium	
1974	Wilbur Wood (3)	L	2–8	California Angels	Comiskey Park	
1975	Wilbur Wood (4)	L	2–3	Oakland Athletics	Oakland Coliseum	
1976	Wilbur Wood (5)	W	4–0	Kansas City Royals	Comiskey Park	
1977	Ken Brett	L	5–9	Toronto Blue Jays	Exhibition Stadium	
1978	Steve Stone	ND (W)	6–5	Boston Red Sox	Comiskey Park	
1979	Ken Kravec	L	3–5	Baltimore Orioles	Memorial Stadium	
1980	Steve Trout	L	3–5	Baltimore Orioles	Comiskey Park	
1981	Britt Burns	ND (W)	5–3	Boston Red Sox	Fenway Park	
1982	Jerry Koosman	ND (W)	7–6	New York Yankees	Yankee Stadium	
1983*	LaMarr Hoyt	L	3–5	Texas Rangers	Arlington Stadium	
1984	LaMarr Hoyt (2)	W	5–2	Baltimore Orioles	Memorial Stadium	
1985	Tom Seaver	W	4–2	Milwaukee Brewers	County Stadium	
1986	Tom Seaver (2)	L	3–5	Milwaukee Brewers	Comiskey Park	
1987	Richard Dotson	W	5–4	Kansas City Royals	Kauffman Stadium	
1988	Ricky Horton	W	8–5	California Angels	Comiskey Park	
1989	Jerry Reuss	W	9–2	California Angels	Angel Stadium of Anaheim	
1990	Mélido Pérez	ND (W)	2–1	Milwaukee Brewers	Comiskey Park	
1991	Jack McDowell	W	9–1	Baltimore Orioles	Memorial Stadium	
1992	Jack McDowell (2)	W	10–4	California Angels	Angel Stadium of Anaheim	
1993*	Jack McDowell (3)	W	10–5	Minnesota Twins	Hubert H. Humphrey Metrodome	
1994	Jack McDowell (4)	L	3–7	Toronto Blue Jays	SkyDome	
1995	Alex Fernandez	L	3–12	Milwaukee Brewers	County Stadium	
1996	Alex Fernandez (2)	ND (L)	2–3	Seattle Mariners	Kingdome	
1997	Jaime Navarro	ND (W)	6–5	Toronto Blue Jays	SkyDome	
1998	Jaime Navarro (2)	W	9–2	Texas Rangers	Rangers Ballpark in Arlington	
1999	James Baldwin	W	8–2	Seattle Mariners	Kingdome	
2000*	Mike Sirotka	L	4–10	Texas Rangers	Rangers Ballpark in Arlington	
2001	David Wells	W	7–4	Cleveland Indians	Jacobs Field	
2002	Mark Buehrle	W	6–5	Seattle Mariners	Safeco Field	
2003	Mark Buehrle (2)	L	0–3	Kansas City Royals	Kauffman Stadium	
2004	Mark Buehrle (3)	ND (L)	7–9	Kansas City Royals	Kauffman Stadium	
2005†	Mark Buehrle (4)	W	1–0	Cleveland Indians	U.S. Cellular Field	
2006	Mark Buehrle (5)	ND (W)	10–4	Cleveland Indians	U.S. Cellular Field	
2007	José Contreras	L	5–12	Cleveland Indians	U.S. Cellular Field	
2008*	Mark Buehrle (6)	ND (L)	8–10	Cleveland Indians	Progressive Field	
2009	Mark Buehrle (7)	ND (W)	4–2	Kansas City Royals	U.S. Cellular Field	
2010	Mark Buehrle (8)	W	6–0	Cleveland Indians	U.S. Cellular Field	
2011	Mark Buehrle (9)	W	15–10	Cleveland Indians	Progressive Field	
2012	John Danks	L	2–3	Texas Rangers	Rangers Ballpark in Arlington	
2013	Chris Sale	W	1–0	Kansas City Royals	U.S. Cellular Field	
2014	Chris Sale (2)	W	5–3	Minnesota Twins	U.S. Cellular Field	
2015	Jeff Samardzija	L	1–10	Kansas City Royals	Kauffman Stadium	
2016	Chris Sale (3)	W	4–3	Oakland Athletics	Oakland Coliseum	
2017	Jose Quintana	L	3–6	Detroit Tigers	U.S. Cellular Field	
2018	James Shields	W	14–7	Kansas City Royals	Kauffman Stadium	
2019	Carlos Rodón	L	3–5	Kansas City Royals	Kauffman Stadium	
2020*	Lucas Giolito	L	5–10	Minnesota Twins	Guaranteed Rate Field	
2021*	Lucas Giolito (2)	ND (L)	3–4	Los Angeles Angels	Angel Stadium of Anaheim	
2022	Lucas Giolito (3)	ND (L)	4–5	Detroit Tigers	Comerica Park	
2023	Dylan Cease	ND (W)	3–2	Houston Astros	Minute Maid Park	
2024	Garrett Crochet	L	0–1	Detroit Tigers	Guaranteed Rate Field	
2025	Sean Burke	W	8–1	Los Angeles Angels	Rate Field	
2026*	Shane Smith	L	2–14	Milwaukee Brewers	American Family Field	
