= Eddie Fisher (baseball) =

American baseball player (1936–2025)

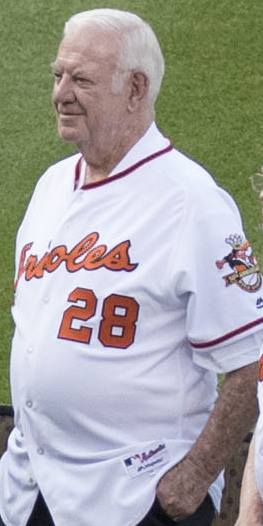
- Fisher at Camden Yards in 2016
- Pitcher
- Born: July 16, 1936; Shreveport, Louisiana, U.S.
- Died: February 17, 2025 (aged 88); Altus, Oklahoma, U.S.
- Batted: Right Threw: Right

MLB debut
- June 22, 1959, for the San Francisco Giants

Last MLB appearance
- September 19, 1973, for the St. Louis Cardinals

MLB statistics
- Win–loss record: 85–70
- Earned run average: 3.41
- Strikeouts: 812
- Saves: 82
- Stats at Baseball Reference

Teams
- San Francisco Giants (1959–1961); Chicago White Sox (1962–1966); Baltimore Orioles (1966–1967); Cleveland Indians (1968); California Angels (1969–1972); Chicago White Sox (1972–1973); St. Louis Cardinals (1973)

Career highlights and awards
- All-Star (1965); World Series champion (1966)

Eddie Gene Fisher (July 16, 1936 – February 17, 2025) was an American professional baseball pitcher who played in Major League Baseball (MLB) for the San Francisco Giants, Chicago White Sox, Baltimore Orioles, Cleveland Indians, California Angels, and St. Louis Cardinals between 1959 and 1973. He was an All-Star in 1965 and at the time of his retirement was the all-time American League leader in relief appearances. He was known for throwing a knuckleball.

== Early life ==
Fisher was born on July 16, 1936, in Shreveport, Louisiana to J.T. and Louise Fisher. At a young age, Fisher moved with his family to Oklahoma, where he attended Friendship High School in Friendship, Oklahoma. He had a high school graduating class of 15 students. He played on Friendship's baseball team, and was an all-state pitcher on the school's 1954 state Class C championship team. Fisher was the winning pitching in the state championship game. His future wife Betty also attended Friendship, and they married the year after graduation.

Fisher also played American Legion baseball in Jackson County, Oklahoma. From 1952 to 1954 between his play for Friendship and in American Legion baseball, Fisher won 80 games and pitched six no-hitters. It has also been reported he won 76 games at Friendship. In 1953, he pitched a perfect game in American Legion play. He played first base when not pitching, and had a combined .350 batting average over the same period. One of his American Legion teammates was fellow future major league relief pitcher Lindy McDaniel.

Fisher also played two or three years of semiprofessional baseball for the Roy Deal Gassers of Oklahoma City. Deal subsequently helped Fisher obtain a scholarship to the University of Oklahoma.

== College ==
Fisher attended Oklahoma on a basketball and baseball scholarship. Fisher played collegiate baseball for three seasons for the Oklahoma Sooners (1956-58). In 1958, he was named to the All-Big Seven conference team as a pitcher. He played in the Basin League during his college years, in Mitchell, South Dakota. In 1957, he pitched a three-hit shutout in Basin League play.

== Pitching career ==
Roy Deal once again helped Fisher, in connection with Fisher signing as a free agent with the National League (NL) San Francisco Giants to play for their Double-A Texas League affiliate, the Corpus Christi Giants.

=== Minor leagues ===
In 1958, Fisher pitched in 22 games for Corpus Christi, starting 16. He had an 11–7 win–loss record, with a 3.43 earned run average (ERA). He was promoted to the Triple-A Phoenix Giants of the Pacific Coast League (PCL) in 1959. He won nine of his first ten decisions to begin the season, with a 2.37 ERA; ending his Phoenix season 10–4 with a 2.97 ERA. He was a knuckleball pitcher with good control, who also threw a variety of curveballs and a slider.

He was called up to pitch for the San Francisco Giants that season, and was the winning pitcher in his first major league appearance on June 22. He had a 2–6 record with a 7.88 ERA in 17 games with the Giants, including five starting appearances.

Fisher played the majority of the 1960 season with the PCL's Tacoma Giants. He led all Pacific Coast League pitchers with 239 innings pitched. He was 17–12 with a 3.31 ERA, starting 32 of the 38 games in which he pitched. In September, he was again called up to the San Francisco Giants, but pitched in only three games.

Fisher began the 1961 season with the San Francisco Giants. He pitched in 17 games, all but one in relief. He was 0–2, with a 5.35 ERA in 33.2 innings and was sent back to Tacoma. In Tacoma, Fisher pitched in 17 games, all as a starting pitcher. He was 9–5, with a 3.01 ERA. This was his last season as a minor league pitcher.

His minor league record from 1958 to 1961 was 47–28 (.627) with a 3.23 ERA in 93 games (632 innings pitched).

=== Major leagues ===
==== Chicago White Sox (1962-65) ====
On November 30, 1961, the Giants traded Fisher, Dom Zanni, Bob Farley and a player to be named later (Verle Tiefenthaler) to the American League (AL) Chicago White Sox in exchange for pitchers Billy Pierce and Don Larsen. In 1962, Fisher pitched in 57 games for the White Sox, starting 12. He was 9–5, with five saves and a 3.10 ERA. Fisher was used as a starter during the second half of the season.

After going to the World Series in 1959, the White Sox had steadily declined. In January 1963, they traded future Hall of Fame shortstop Luis Aparicio and Al Smith to the Baltimore Orioles for future Hall of Fame relief pitcher Hoyt Wilhelm, Dave Nicholson, Pete Ward and Ron Hansen. Wilhelm is considered one in the very top tier of knuckleball pitchers in major league baseball history. Although 39-years old, the White Sox considered Wilhelm the premier relief pitcher in baseball, who had a 1.94 ERA in 1962 for the Orioles, with a 7–10 record and 15 saves.

This gave the White Sox two knuckleballers. Fisher recognized that his knuckleball, though good, paled in comparison to Wilhelm's. Fisher came under Wilhelm's tutelage, both by Wilhelm actively teaching Fisher how to better throw the knuckleball, and by Fisher observing Wilhelm's example in throwing the knuckleball himself.

In 1963, while Wilhelm was the team's closer, Fisher split his time between starting and relief pitching, with a 9–8 record and 3.95 ERA. The team finished 94–68, in second place behind the New York Yankees. The White Sox led the AL in team ERA (2.97). He pitched almost exclusively in relief in 1964 (57 of 59 games), with a 3.02 ERA, 6–3 record and nine saves; the 40-year old Wilhelm being 12–3, with a 1.99 ERA and 27 saves. Fisher "bloomed" as a relief pitcher during the second half of the season, with six saves and 21 games finished. The White Sox again finished in second place, this time only one game behind the Yankees. The White Sox again led the AL in team ERA (2.72).

In Fisher's 15-year career, 1965 stands out as his best season. He had a 15–7 won–loss record with 24 saves and a 2.40 ERA. He pitched 165.1 innings, all in relief, in a then American League record 82 games, while also finishing an AL leading 60 games as the White Sox closer. Although Wilhelm had a lower ERA (1.81), he closed 15 fewer games. Fisher became the third pitcher in American League history to have at least 15 wins and 15 saves in a season (along with Luis Arroyo in 1961 and Dick Radatz in 1963). He today remains the only Chicago White Sox pitcher to accomplish this pitching feat.

In 1965, Fisher was named to the American League All-Star team and finished 4th in the MVP voting. He pitched the final two innings of the 1965 All-Star Game for the AL, holding the National League scoreless on one hit. He retired future Hall of Famers Billy Williams and Willie Mays in the eighth inning and Hank Aaron, Roberto Clemente and Ron Santo in order in the top of the ninth. In a 15-inning game against the Yankees on June 4, 1965, he pitched six innings in relief allowing only one hit, in a 2–0 win over the Yankees; capping a seven-game, 15.2 scoreless inning streak.

Fisher led the league that season in WHIP (0.974), games pitched (82), and games finished (60), and was second in ERA (2.40) and saves (24). His 15–7 record gave him a winning percentage of .682, which ranked fourth. The White Sox finished in second place that year for the third consecutive year, with a record of 95–67; seven games behind the Minnesota Twins. The Orioles led the AL with a 2.98 team ERA and the White Sox were second at 2.99.

White Sox Hall of Fame manager Al López believed that Fisher increased his use of the knuckleball after he watched Wilhelm throw it on nearly every pitch, and that by 1965 Fisher was throwing it about 85% of the time. Lopez believed Fisher's increased use of the knuckleball is what was making him an excellent pitcher that year.

==== Baltimore Orioles ====
He was acquired by the Baltimore Orioles from the White Sox for second baseman, and fellow Oklahoman, Jerry Adair and minor league outfielder John Riddle on June 12 or 13, 1966. The Orioles were in second place at the time of the trade. The transaction strengthened the Orioles' bullpen which had been a weakness since the ballclub faltered from first to third place during the final month of its 1964 campaign. In 44 appearances with the eventual American League pennant winners, he was 5–3 with 14 saves and a 2.64 ERA in 712/3 innings. Baltimore won the 1966 World Series, although Fisher did not appear in any of the four games against the Los Angeles Dodgers. Jim Palmer, Wally Bunker, and Dave McNally all pitched complete game shutouts, and the team needed only one relief appearance, provided by Moe Drabowsky.

The 1964 team had three capable relief pitchers in Stu Miller (66 games, 3.06 ERA, 9–9, 22 saves), Harvey Haddix (49 games, 2.31 ERA, 5–5, nine saves), and Dick Hall (45 games, 1.85 ERA, 9–1, nine saves), but fell off after those three. In 1966, the Orioles' bullpen included quality relief pitching in Fisher, closer Miller (51 games, 2.25 ERA, 9–4, 18 saves), Drabowsky (41 relief appearances out of 44 games pitched, 2.81 ERA, 6–0, six saves), Gene Brabender (31 games, 3.55 ERA, 4–3, two saves), Dick Hall (32 games, 3.95 ERA, 6–2, seven saves) and Eddie Watt (30 out of 43 games in relief, 3.83 ERA, 9–7, four saves), among others. Wally Bunker, who pitched a shutout in Game 3 of the 1966 Word Series, stated that the strong starting pitching in the World Series obscured the critical importance of Baltimore's relief pitchers. He believed it was the Orioles' relief pitchers that got the team to the World Series, rather than the starters. No Orioles' starter had more than Palmer's 15 wins.

The Orioles fell to 6th place in 1967, with a 76–85 record. Fisher pitched 46 games in relief, with a 3.61 ERA and a 4–3 record, but only had one save.

==== Cleveland Indians and California Angels ====
Fisher spent the 1968 season with the Alvin Dark-managed Cleveland Indians after being traded along with minor leaguers Johnny Scruggs and Bob Scott from the Orioles for John O'Donoghue and Gordon Lund on November 28, 1967. Fisher led the Indians with 54 pitching appearances. He had a 4–2 record, with a 2.85 ERA and four saves on a third place Cleveland team.

In October 1968, Cleveland traded Fisher to the California Angels for pitcher Jack Hamilton, where Fisher pitched from 1969 to August 1972. In nearly four seasons with the Angels, he pitched in 219 games, 212 in relief. He had an overall record of 21–19, with 17 saves and a 3.22 ERA. His best year with the Angels came in 1971, with a 10–8 record and 2.72 ERA.

==== Chicago White Sox (1972-73) and St. Louis Cardinals ====
On August 17, 1972, the Angels traded Fisher to the White Sox once again, for Bruce Miller and a player to be named later (Bruce Kimm). He started four of the six games he played for the White Sox in 1972, with a 4.43 ERA. Teamed with another knuckleballer, 24-game winner Wilbur Wood, Fisher started 16 of his 26 games in 1973. He was 6–7, with a 4.88 ERA.

The White Sox sold Fisher's contract rights to the St. Louis Cardinals on August 29, 1973. He pitched seven innings in relief over six games, with a 2–1 record and 1.29 ERA. Although he pitched well, these were the 37-year old Fisher's final games in the major leagues. He was released by the Cardinals on October 26, 1973.

==== Career ====
Fisher started just 63 out of the 690 games he appeared in, and completed 7 of those, two for shutouts. He is better-known, however, for his effective relief work.

Career totals include a record of 85–70 with 81 saves. In 1,5382/3 innings pitched he had 812 strikeouts, an ERA of 3.41, and a low 1.193 WHIP. He had a lifetime batting average of just .122 (30-for-246), but did once have three hits in a game, on September 19, 1960, vs. the Chicago Cubs.

==== Knuckleball origin ====
Fisher had first tried to develop a knuckleball during his senior year in high school, but his coach (Jack Baer) discouraged him from throwing the pitch. Similarly, his college coach at Oklahoma discouraged Fisher from using the knuckleball. Fisher did use it during semipro baseball two of three years, except the one year Baer was his semipro catcher. In Corpus Christi, manager Ray Murray, who had been a catcher for Hoyt Wilhelm and other knuckleballers during his playing career, encouraged Fisher to use it. He found Fisher threw it harder than most other pitchers. The knuckleball is notoriously difficult on catchers because of its unpredictable movement and the level of concentration required. During his season in Corpus Christi, Fisher was warming up with catcher Al Stieglitz when a knuckleball struck Stieglitz near his left eye, requiring 12-stitches to close the laceration.

== Honors ==
Fisher was selected the 1965 Sporting News Reliever of the Year.

He was inducted into the University of Oklahoma Baseball Hall of Fame in 2007, and the Oklahoma Sports Hall of Fame in 2008. The University of Oklahoma honored Fisher in 2007 at its Diamond Dinner.

In 1965, he was honored by American Legion Baseball as its Man of the Year.

== Personal life ==
During his baseball career, Fisher owned and operated Eddie Fisher’s Southwest Oklahoma Baseball Camp. After retiring, Fisher returned to Oklahoma. He served as president of First Federal Savings and Loan. He also owned a sporting goods shop. He later joined the Oklahoma Tourism & Recreation Department, serving as state director of golf operations. Fisher was also active in the Major League Baseball Players Alumni Association.

== Death ==
Fisher died in Altus, Oklahoma, on February 17, 2025, at the age of 88. He was survived by Betty Fisher, dying just two months before their 70th wedding anniversary, four children, eight grandchildren and seven great grandchildren.

== See also ==
- List of knuckleball pitchers
