= Tommie Reynolds =

American baseball player (1941–2025)

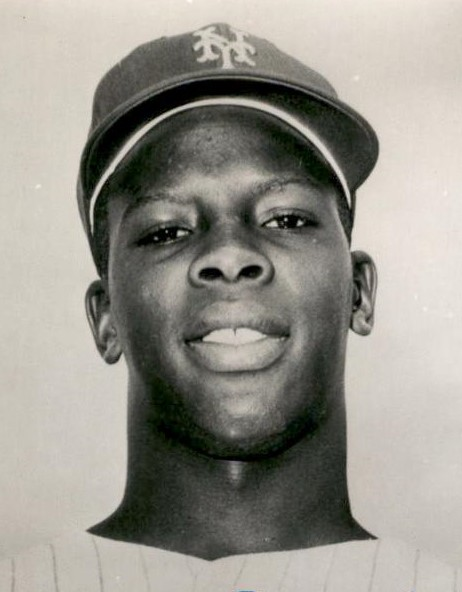
- Outfielder
- Born: August 15, 1941; Arizona, Louisiana, U.S.
- Died: March 19, 2025 (aged 83); Dothan, Alabama, U.S.
- Batted: Right Threw: Right

MLB debut
- September 5, 1963, for the Kansas City Athletics

Last MLB appearance
- October 1, 1972, for the Milwaukee Brewers

MLB statistics
- Batting average: .226
- Home runs: 12
- Runs batted in: 87
- Stats at Baseball Reference

Teams
- As player: Kansas City / Oakland Athletics (1963–1965; 1969); New York Mets (1967); California Angels (1970–1971); Milwaukee Brewers (1972); As coach: Oakland Athletics (1989–1995); St. Louis Cardinals (1996)

Career highlights and awards
- World Series champion (1989)

Tommie D. Reynolds (August 15, 1941 – March 19, 2025) was an American Major League Baseball outfielder who was signed by the Kansas City Athletics as an amateur free agent in 1963 and played for them from 1963 to 1965. He also played for the New York Mets (1967), Oakland Athletics (1969), California Angels (1970–1971), and Milwaukee Brewers (1972).

An average defensive outfielder, Reynolds started in almost half of his team's games in both 1965 and 1969, usually in left field. He was also used quite often as a pinch hitter throughout his career. His busiest and best season came in 1969, when he played in 107 games and made 363 plate appearances for Oakland. He batted .257 with 2 home runs, 20 RBI, and 51 runs scored. He died in Dothan, Alabama on March 19, 2025, at the age of 83.

== Career highlights ==
- A pair of 4-hit games...three singles and a double vs. the Cleveland Indians (September 2, 1965), and three singles and a double vs. the Detroit Tigers (August 26, 1969)
- Eight 3-hit games, four of which came in 1970
- One 4- RBI game, including a three-run homer against All-Star Mickey Lolich of the Detroit Tigers (April 30, 1964)
- a pinch hit home run against All-Star Luis Tiant of the Cleveland Indians (May 30, 1969)
- Hit a combined .424 (36-for-85) against All-Stars Hank Aguirre, Mickey Lolich, Sam McDowell, and Juan Pizarro

=== Career totals ===
His career totals include 513 games played, 265 hits, 12 home runs, 87 RBI, 141 runs scored, and a lifetime batting average of .226.

== Coaching ==
After his playing career was over, Reynolds served as a coach for the Oakland Athletics (1989–1995) and the St. Louis Cardinals (1996).

== Trivia ==
- Reynolds was the cousin of former major league outfielder Floyd Robinson.
- Reynolds led the Midwest League in batting average (.332) and tied for the league lead in RBI (88) while playing for the Burlington Bees in 1963.
- Reynolds was the last strikeout victim of Seattle Pilots right-hander Dick Bates at Sick's Stadium on April 27, 1969.

== See also ==
- List of St. Louis Cardinals coaches
