= Zanni (surname) =

Zanni is a surname. Notable people with the surname include:

- Alessandro Zanni (born 1984), Italian rugby union footballer
- Chiara Zanni (born 1978), Canadian actress
- Dom Zanni (born 1932), former right-handed pitcher in Major League Baseball
- Matteo Zanni (born 1987), Italian ice dancer
- Reto Zanni (born 1980), Swiss football player
- Marc Zanni Vilamitjana (born 1969), Spanish voice actor
