= Bob Roselli =

American baseball player (1931–2009)

- Catcher
- Born: December 10, 1931; San Francisco, California, U.S.
- Died: November 6, 2009 (aged 77); Roseville, California, U.S.
- Batted: Right Threw: Right

MLB debut
- August 16, 1955, for the Milwaukee Braves

Last MLB appearance
- September 29, 1962, for the Chicago White Sox

MLB statistics
- Batting average: .219
- Home runs: 2
- Runs batted in: 10
- Stats at Baseball Reference

Teams
- Milwaukee Braves (1955–1956, 1958); Chicago White Sox (1961–1962)

Robert Edward Roselli (December 10, 1931 – November 6, 2009) was an American professional baseball player, a catcher who played in Major League Baseball between the 1955 and 1962 seasons. Listed at 5 ft 11 in (1.80 m), 185 lb (84 kg), Roselli batted and threw right-handed. He was born in San Francisco.

Roselli served in the U.S. Army during the Korean War, missing the 1954 season and part of the 1955 season. Following his discharge, Roselli played in parts of three seasons with the Braves as a backup for Del Crandall (1955–56, 1958), and later joined the Chicago White Sox to help Sherm Lollar for two years (1961–62). His most productive season came with the 1961 White Sox, when he hit a career-high .263 in 22 games.

In a five-season career, Roselli was a .219 hitter (25-for-114) with two home runs and 10 RBI in 68 games, including eight runs, seven doubles, one triple, and one stolen base.

Following his big-league career, Roselli played for Triple-A Hawaii Islanders in 1963, his last baseball season. After retiring, he was a scout for the Baltimore Orioles and Cincinnati Reds, worked as a salesman and also coached youth baseball teams.

Roselli died in Roseville, California, at the age of 77.

== See also ==
- 1955 Milwaukee Braves season
- 1956 Milwaukee Braves season
- 1958 Milwaukee Braves season
- 1962 Chicago White Sox season
- 1961 Chicago White Sox season
