= Brian McCall =

Brian McCall may refer to:

- Brian McCall (politician) (born 1958), Texas politician and university administrator
- Brian McCall (baseball) (born 1943), American baseball player
- Brian McCall (rugby union) (born 1959), Northern Irish rugby union player, British army officer
