= Cam Carreon =

American baseball player (1937–1987)

Camilo Carreón
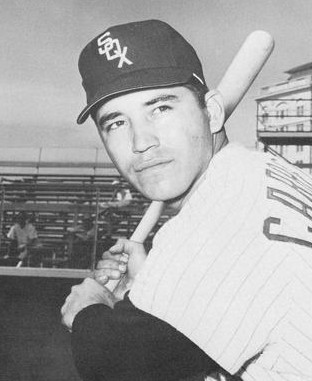
- Catcher
- Born: August 6, 1937; Colton, California, U.S.
- Died: September 2, 1987 (aged 50); Tucson, Arizona, U.S.
- Batted: Right Threw: Right

MLB debut
- September 27, 1959, for the Chicago White Sox

Last MLB appearance
- June 8, 1966, for the Baltimore Orioles

MLB statistics
- Batting average: .264
- Home runs: 11
- Runs batted in: 114
- Stats at Baseball Reference

Teams
- Chicago White Sox (1959–1964); Cleveland Indians (1965); Baltimore Orioles (1966)

Camilo Carreón (August 6, 1937 – September 2, 1987) was an American professional baseball player. The catcher appeared in 354 games over all or parts of eight Major League Baseball seasons between 1959 and 1966 for the Chicago White Sox, Cleveland Indians and Baltimore Orioles. His son Mark was also a major league player. Born in Colton, California, Camilo Carreón threw and batted right-handed, and was listed as 6 feet 1 inch (1.85 m) tall and 190 pounds (86 kg).

== Playing career ==
=== White Sox ===
Signed by the White Sox in 1956, Carreón rose steadily through their farm system, hitting over .300 at three different levels, including .311 in 1959 with Indianapolis in the Triple-A American Association, with 165 hits and 91 runs batted in. He was named the Association's All-Star catcher. Carreón made his major league debut on September 27, 1959, the closing day of Chicago's pennant-winning season. He hit a fly ball out against Pete Burnside of the Detroit Tigers in his only at bat. He was late reporting to Sarasota, Florida, for spring training in 1960 because of service in the U.S. Army, then spent the bulk of the 1960 campaign back in Triple-A, this time with San Diego of the Pacific Coast League, and hit .279 in 109 games. He then received his second consecutive September call-up, batting .235 in eight games, including seven starts as catcher.

Carreón made the White Sox for good in 1961, getting into 78 games, with 63 starts at catcher in relief of 37-year-old veteran star Sherm Lollar. He hit a two-run single off Whitey Ford to give Juan Pizarro a 2–1 victory over the New York Yankees on August 15, 1961. The second-inning hit enabled the White Sox to break Ford's 14-game winning streak. Overall, he hit .271 in his first full MLB season. The next year, 1962, he supplanted Lollar as the White Sox' regular catcher, starting 85 games and hitting .256. His best big-league season came in 1963, when he played in 101 games and hit .274, starting 81 games behind the plate. It was his last full and healthy season in the majors.

=== Indians and Orioles ===
The White Sox placed Carreón on the disabled list on July 3, 1964, after he tore tendons in his right arm. During the 1964–65 offseason, Chicago traded him to the Cleveland Indians as part of a blockbuster three-way trade involving the Kansas City Athletics that also included Rocky Colavito, Tommy John and Tommie Agee. Going into the 1965 campaign, Carreón was listed as the Indians' second-string catcher, behind Joe Azcue. But he played only 19 games with the Tribe, spent 45 games back in Triple-A with Portland of the Pacific Coast League, and was one of five players assigned outright to Portland in October 1965. Carreón was traded from the Indians to the Orioles for Lou Piniella and $25,000 on 10 March 1966. The Orioles were en route to their first-ever American League pennant that season, but Carreón got into only four games for Baltimore (his last on June 8, when he hit a double in his final MLB at bat), and spent the latter half of the year with Triple-A Rochester. He played two more minor league seasons before retiring from baseball.

As a major leaguer, Carreón collected 260 hits, including 43 doubles, four triples, and 11 home runs, with 114 runs batted in. He batted .264 lifetime. Defensively, he recorded a .993 fielding percentage as a catcher, committing only 13 errors in 1,776 total chances. He died in Tucson, Arizona, at the age of 50, and is buried in the Hermosa Memorial Cemetery in Colton.

== See also ==
- List of second-generation Major League Baseball players
- Chicago White Sox all-time roster
