= Joe Shipley =

American baseball player (1935–2024)

- Pitcher
- Born: May 9, 1935; Morristown, Tennessee, U.S.
- Died: May 1, 2024 (aged 88); St. Charles, Missouri, U.S.
- Batted: Right Threw: Right

MLB debut
- July 14, 1958, for the San Francisco Giants

Last MLB appearance
- July 23, 1963, for the Chicago White Sox

MLB statistics
- Win–loss record: 0–1
- Earned run average: 5.93
- Strikeouts: 23
- Stats at Baseball Reference

Teams
- San Francisco Giants (1958–1960); Chicago White Sox (1963)

Joseph Clark Shipley (May 9, 1935 – May 1, 2024) was an American professional baseball player. The right-handed pitcher appeared in 29 games over four seasons in Major League Baseball for the San Francisco Giants (1958–60) and Chicago White Sox (1963). He was born in Morristown, Tennessee, and was listed as 6 feet 4 inches (1.93 m) tall and 210 pounds (95 kg). Shipley died in St. Charles, Missouri, on May 1, 2024, at the age of 88.

== Career ==
Shipley's pro career lasted for 13 seasons (1953–65). Twenty-eight of his 29 big-league appearances came as a relief pitcher. In his one starting assignment, the second game of a doubleheader against the Philadelphia Phillies on June 14, 1959, he allowed two hits, five bases on balls and two earned runs in 22/3 innings pitched, and did not gain a decision in an eventual 6–3 Giants' loss.

All told, Shipley posted a 0–1 record with a 5.93 earned run average in the majors. He worked 44 innings, allowing 48 hits and 35 walks; he struck out 23. He had 13 games finished and no saves.
