= Joe Cunningham (baseball) =

American baseball player (1931–2021)

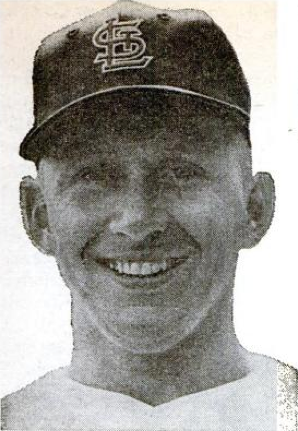
- Cunningham in 1960
- First baseman / Right fielder
- Born: August 27, 1931; Paterson, New Jersey, U.S.
- Died: March 25, 2021 (aged 89); Chesterfield, Missouri, U.S.
- Batted: Left Threw: Left

MLB debut
- June 30, 1954, for the St. Louis Cardinals

Last MLB appearance
- April 17, 1966, for the Washington Senators

MLB statistics
- Batting average: .291
- Home runs: 64
- Runs batted in: 436
- Stats at Baseball Reference

Teams
- St. Louis Cardinals (1954, 1956–1961); Chicago White Sox (1962–1964); Washington Senators (1964–1966)

Career highlights and awards
- 2× All-Star (1959, 1959²)

Joseph Robert Cunningham Jr. (August 27, 1931 – March 25, 2021) was an American baseball first baseman and outfielder who played 12 seasons in Major League Baseball (MLB) for the St. Louis Cardinals, Chicago White Sox, and Washington Senators from 1954 to 1966. He batted and threw left-handed, and was a two-time All-Star.

Cunningham batted .291 with 980 hits over 1,141 career games. He finished his career with more walks (599) than strikeouts (369).

== Early life ==
Cunningham was born in Paterson, New Jersey, on August 27, 1931, and was raised in Saddle River Township (since renamed as Saddle Brook, New Jersey). He attended Lodi High School in nearby Lodi and was signed as an amateur free agent by the St. Louis Cardinals before the 1949 season.

== Professional career ==
Cunningham played four seasons in the minor leagues from 1949 to 1951, and the first part of the 1954 season. He served in the military for two years during the Korean War. He made his MLB debut on June 30, 1954, at the age of 22, batting 2-for-5 with his first major league home run and five runs batted in (RBI) in a 11–3 win over the Cincinnati Redlegs. In his first four major league games, Cunningham became the first Cardinals player to hit at least two home runs. This feat was equaled 62 years later on April 6, 2016, when Jeremy Hazelbaker also hit two home runs in his first four games.

Cunningham's 1959 season was arguably his best individual year. He led the National League in on-base percentage at .453 and batted .345 to finish second to Hank Aaron for the NL batting title. He was selected to both the first and second All-Star game that season.

Cunningham was traded from the Cardinals to the Chicago White Sox after the 1961 season in exchange for long-time star Minnie Miñoso. Although his first season as the White Sox first baseman was successful, Cunningham would never fully recover from a broken collarbone suffered in a collision on June 3, 1963. He played only 89 games in 1964 and 95 games in 1965, with his batting average dropping to .231 and .229, respectively. He played his final major league game on April 17, 1966, at the age of 34.

In a 12-season career, Cunningham posted a .291 batting average (980-3362) with 64 home runs, 525 runs scored, and 436 RBI in 1141 games played. His on-base percentage was .403 (#48 all time) and slugging percentage was .417. He compiled a .989 fielding percentage. His primary position was first base, in which he played in 608 games. He also played in the outfield, appearing in 404 games in right field and 46 games in left field. Cunningham collected 599 walks in his career and struck out only 369 times.

== Post-playing career ==
After retiring as a player, Cunningham returned to the Redbirds and managed in their farm system at the Class A level from 1968 to 1971. He was subsequently appointed as director of sales of the Cardinals in 1972. In that capacity, he oversaw the establishment of the group and season ticket departments. He was also influential in starting up team programs such as community nights and high school games at Busch Memorial Stadium. He went on to work as a coach for the Cardinals during the 1982 season.

Cunningham acted as the Cardinals' community relations director in the early 1990s. He collaborated closely with schools in the St. Louis area and in devising the "Say No To Drugs" program (which later became the Fredbird & Friends Elementary School Program). In recognition of his work for the franchise, the Cardinals dedicated a new section of Busch Stadium as "Cunningham Corner" in 2015.

== Personal life ==
Cunningham was married to Kathe Dillard for 60 years until his death. One of their two sons, Joe III, played in the minor leagues from 1984 to 1988 and also worked as a batting instructor and manager in the Cardinals' farm system.

Cunningham died on March 25, 2021, at his home in Chesterfield, Missouri. He was 89.
