= Verle Tiefenthaler =

American baseball player (1937–2025)

- Pitcher
- Born: July 11, 1937; Carroll, Iowa, U.S.
- Died: May 28, 2025 (aged 87); Carroll, Iowa, U.S.
- Batted: Left Threw: Right

MLB debut
- August 19, 1962, for the Chicago White Sox

Last MLB appearance
- August 31, 1962, for the Chicago White Sox

MLB statistics
- Win–loss record: 0–0
- Earned run average: 9.82
- Strikeouts: 1
- Stats at Baseball Reference

Teams
- Chicago White Sox (1962)

Verle Matthew Tiefenthaler (July 11, 1937 – May 28, 2025) was an American professional baseball pitcher who appeared briefly in Major League Baseball as a member of the Chicago White Sox in 1962. A right-hander, he batted left-handed and was listed as 6 feet 1 inch (1.85 m) tall and 190 pounds (86 kg).

== Biography ==
Tiefenthaler was a native of Carroll, Iowa. In 1955, he was signed by the New York Giants at age 17 and spent seven years in the Giants' farm system before he was sent to Chicago on August 17, 1962, as the "player to be named later" to complete a trade that had been made almost nine months before—on November 30, 1961—when the San Francisco Giants had obtained veteran left-hander Billy Pierce from the White Sox in a six-player transaction. Two days after his trade from the Giants, on August 19, Tiefenthaler made his MLB debut. In an afternoon game at Comiskey Park against the Detroit Tigers, Tiefenthaler relieved Dom Zanni (coincidentally, one of the players also involved in the Pierce trade) in the fourth inning and with the bases loaded, with Detroit leading 2–1. Tiefenthaler got two quick outs, but he walked Chico Fernández to force in a run, then surrendered a grand slam home run to Bill Bruton. He then allowed a single to Al Kaline before, charged with two earned runs, he left the game with the White Sox down 7–1. He made two more appearances out of the White Sox bullpen before the end of the 1962 campaign.

In the majors, Tiefenthaler had a 0–0 record, with a 9.82 earned run average, in three games and 32/3 innings pitched. He allowed six hits and seven bases on balls, recording one strikeout. He pitched at Triple-A for one more season, 1963, before leaving professional baseball.

Tiefenthaler died on May 28, 2025, at the age of 87.
