= Ramón Conde =

Puerto Rican baseball player (1934–2020)

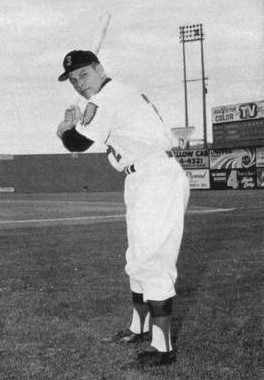
- Third baseman
- Born: December 29, 1934; Juana Díaz, Puerto Rico
- Died: February 22, 2020 (aged 85); West Palm Beach, Florida, U.S.
- Batted: Right Threw: Right

MLB debut
- July 17, 1962, for the Chicago White Sox

Last MLB appearance
- August 14, 1962, for the Chicago White Sox

MLB statistics
- Batting average: .000
- At bats: 16
- Runs batted in: 1
- Stats at Baseball Reference

Teams
- Chicago White Sox (1962)

Ramón Luis Conde Román (December 29, 1934 – February 23, 2020) was a professional baseball player from Puerto Rico. Also known as "Wito," he amassed 3,025 base hits in the U.S., the Puerto Rican Winter League, and Mexico. Alas, none of those were in his one brief shot in the majors.

== Career ==
Aged 27, Conde played 14 games for the Chicago White Sox in 1962, primarily as a third baseman. He came to the plate 19 times without a hit, although he did manage three walks.

Conde had an extensive minor league baseball career as well. He began playing in the U.S. in 1954 with the Sioux City Soos of the Western League The 1970 season was his last in the U.S. minors. He amassed 2,045 total hits at various levels, plus 20 more during a brief stretch in Mexico in 1970.

Conde became a coach and scout in Puerto Rico. He also managed in the Mexican League in 1981 and 1986, as well as briefly managing the rookie league Wytheville Cubs in 1985. Of particular note, he became an executive in the PRWL.

== Death ==
Conde died of a heart attack on February 22, 2020, at the age of 85.

== See also ==
- List of Major League Baseball players from Puerto Rico
