= Mike Joyce (baseball) =

American baseball player (born 1941)

- Pitcher
- Born: February 12, 1941 (age 85); Detroit, Michigan
- Batted: Right Threw: Right

MLB debut
- July 2, 1962, for the Chicago White Sox

Last MLB appearance
- September 29, 1963, for the Chicago White Sox

MLB statistics
- Win–loss record: 2–1
- Earned run average: 4.33
- Strikeouts: 16
- Stats at Baseball Reference

Teams
- Chicago White Sox (1962–1963)

Michael Lewis Joyce (born February 12, 1941) is an American former professional baseball relief pitcher, who played in Major League Baseball (MLB) for the Chicago White Sox during the 1962 and 1963 seasons. Listed at 6 ft 2 in (1.88 m), 193 pounds (88 kg), Joyce batted and threw right-handed.

== Early years ==
Joyce is a native of Detroit, Michigan. He attended Dondero High School in Royal Oak, Michigan, and played college baseball at the University of Michigan, where future MLB All-Star Bill Freehan was a teammate. Joyce was named All Big-10, in 1961.

== Professional career ==
=== Chicago White Sox ===
Joyce was signed as an amateur free agent by the Chicago White Sox, prior to the 1962 season. His major league debut occurred on July 2, 1962, as the Chisox took on the Detroit Tigers, on the road at Tiger Stadium. Joyce pitched one scoreless inning, in relief of Sox’ starting pitcher Frank Baumann.

All told, in his two partial MLB seasons, Joyce posted a 2–1 record with a 4.33 earned run average (ERA). In 31 career pitching appearances, he made only one start. Overall, Joyce gave up 26 runs on 53 hits and 22 walks, while striking out 16 batters in 54.0 career innings of work.

=== New York Mets system ===
On March 31, 1964, Joyce was dealt to the New York Mets for cash considerations. By that time, his career had already begun its decline; in a 2011 interview, Joyce revealed that he had indeed injured his pitching shoulder, earlier in Spring, 1964.

While having appeared at several levels of the Mets’ farm system, Joyce never won a single game at any stop, going 0–13 with a 7.09 ERA.

Joyce’s brief professional baseball career extended from 1962 through 1965 in the White Sox' and Mets' organizations.
