= Bob Farley =

American baseball player (born 1937)

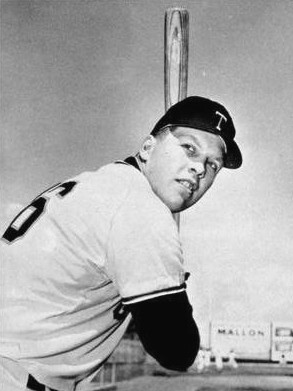
- First baseman/Outfielder
- Born: November 15, 1937 (age 88); Watsontown, Pennsylvania, U.S.
- Batted: Left Threw: Left

MLB debut
- April 15, 1961, for the San Francisco Giants

Last MLB appearance
- September 26, 1962, for the Detroit Tigers

MLB statistics
- Batting average: .163
- Home runs: 2
- Runs batted in: 9
- Stats at Baseball Reference

Teams
- San Francisco Giants (1961); Chicago White Sox (1962); Detroit Tigers (1962)

Robert Jacob Farley (born November 15, 1937) is a retired American professional baseball player. He was a first baseman and outfielder who played part of 1961 and all of 1962 in Major League Baseball for the San Francisco Giants, Chicago White Sox and Detroit Tigers. Farley threw and batted left-handed, stood 6 feet 2 inches (1.88 m) tall and weighed 200 pounds (91 kg).

Farley first came to the Majors with the Giants in 1961, appearing with them in a total of 13 games before the mid-May cutdown date and after the post-September 1 roster expansion. He batted only .100 with two singles in 20 at bats, but in between fashioned his best minor league season, hitting .307 with 20 home runs for the Triple-A Tacoma Giants. That November he was included in the multi-player interleague trade with the White Sox that brought veteran left-handed starting pitcher Billy Pierce to San Francisco. Pierce would help lead the 1962 Giants to the National League championship by winning 16 games.

Farley, meanwhile, spent all of 1962 in the American League and continued to struggle at the plate. After batting .189 with the White Sox, he was traded to the Tigers in June for veteran outfielder Charlie Maxwell. The change of scenery did not help, as Farley hit only .160 for Detroit. He hit two home runs that season, one for the White Sox (ironically, off Detroit pitcher Paul Foytack on May 31) and one for the Tigers (against Bob Giggie of the Kansas City Athletics on July 20).

All told, Bob Farley appeared in 84 MLB games played, batted 123 times and notched 20 hits, including three doubles and one triple, with those two home runs. He played the final three seasons of his professional career in the minors, retiring after the 1965 campaign.
