= Floyd Robinson =

American baseball player (born 1935)

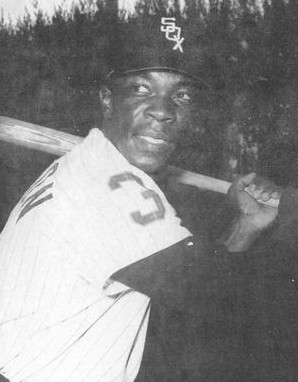
- Outfielder
- Born: May 9, 1935 (age 91); Prescott, Arkansas, U.S.
- Batted: Left Threw: Right

MLB debut
- August 10, 1960, for the Chicago White Sox

Last MLB appearance
- September 29, 1968, for the Boston Red Sox

MLB statistics
- Batting average: .283
- Home runs: 67
- Runs batted in: 426
- Stats at Baseball Reference

Teams
- Chicago White Sox (1960–1966); Cincinnati Reds (1967); Oakland Athletics (1968); Boston Red Sox (1968)

Floyd Andrew Robinson (born May 9, 1935) is an American former outfielder in Major League Baseball for the Chicago White Sox (1960–1966), Cincinnati Reds (1967), and the Oakland Athletics and Boston Red Sox (1968). He batted left-handed and threw right-handed.

== Early career ==
Robinson was born on May 9th 1935, with many sources incorrectly stating 1936 as his birth year, in Prescott, Arkansas. Robinson was initially raised by his mother, Lois Sandifer before relocating to the Logan Heights neighborhood of San Diego to live with his father, George Robinson, who was a well known auto shop owner within the region. Robinson attended San Diego High School in San Diego, California, where he starred in both baseball and football. He was offered a football scholarship to the University of Arizona as a quarterback, but chose to sign a professional baseball contract. He signed directly with the San Diego Padres of the Pacific Coast League in 1954, and was acquired by the White Sox when they signed a working agreement with the Padres in 1960.

== MLB outfielder ==
Robinson made his major league debut at age 24 on August 10, 1960 in a 6-0 White Sox home loss to the New York Yankees, starting in right field and going 0-for-3 against Art Ditmar. After batting in double-digit games over a five-week span without a hit, he notched his first career hit on September 18, 1960 in an 8-4 road win over the Detroit Tigers with a sixth-inning single off Jim Bunning. In his next at-bat, he got his first career run-batted-in with a single off Dave Sisler that plated Ted Kluszewski.

Robinson was managed by Hall of Famer Al López, a man he respected a great deal, for most of his seven-year White Sox career. Eddie Stanky managed the 1966 White Sox, which was Robinson's final year with the team. Stanky was known for prickly relationships with his ballplayers.

His first full year in the majors, 1961, was an outstanding one as he finished tied for third in the American League Rookie of the Year voting. He posted a .310 batting average with 11 home runs, 59 runs batted in, 134 hits and 52 bases on balls.

In 1962, he finished 10th in the American League MVP voting (Mickey Mantle won) and had 187 hits in 600 at bats for a .312 batting average, third in the league. He led the league in doubles that year with 45, and was fourth in RBIs with 109. On July 22, 1962, Robinson became part of baseball history with six hits (all singles) in six at-bats in a nine-inning game. He is one of only 35 American Leaguers to accomplish the feat.

In 1964, Robinson came closer to reaching the World Series than he ever would when the White Sox went 98–64, one game behind the 99-63 New York Yankees. It was the second of three straight years that his team finished second in the American League. The White Sox had reached the World Series in 1959, one year before Robinson reached the majors. However, Robinson never played on a team with a losing record.

Robinson's career high in home runs came in 1965 when he hit 14 with 66 RBIs. That was his last major offensive year.

In December 1966 he was traded to the Reds, for whom he played one season, batting .238 with one home run and 10 RBIs in 55 games. In November 1967 he was traded to the Athletics, for whom he batted .247 with one home run and 14 RBIs in 53 games. On July 31 his contract was purchased by the Red Sox, for whom Robinson played 23 games, including his final career game on September 29, 1968. A knee injury in 1967 had cut short his career.

In nine major league seasons, Robinson hit .283 with 67 home runs and 426 RBIs. He accumulated 140 doubles, 36 triples, and 42 stolen bases with 458 runs scored. Defensively, in 886 games Robinson committed 30 errors for a .981 fielding percentage.

== Off the field ==
Robinson is a cousin of former major league outfielder Tommie Reynolds, who played eight years in the majors for five teams from 1963 to 1972.

After baseball, Robinson and his wife Sandra, whom he married in 1965, are also active business partners, investing in multiple real estate and apartment buildings across Southeast San Diego, including a small grocery store on Market Street in the Encanto neighborhood that has since closed. One such building is the Golden Age Garden, a low-income senior citizen apartment complex in the Mountain View neighborhood of San Diego. In 2007, they established the nonprofit Floyd Robinson Foundation. The Robinsons had two children, Kevin (1964-2020) and Rhonda Aniki (1967-), who contributed to their parent’s renowned business to this day, with Kevin taking a leadership position during his lifetime.

In 2009, Robinson was inducted by the San Diego Hall of Champions into the Breitbard Hall of Fame honoring San Diego's finest athletes both on and off the field.

He is of partial American-Indian heritage, being descended from the Blackfoot Nation.

== See also ==
- List of Major League Baseball annual doubles leaders
- List of Major League Baseball single-game hits leaders
