= Dave Nicholson =

American baseball player (1939–2023)

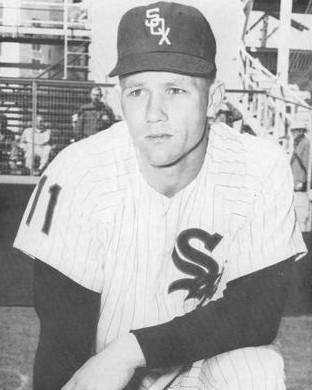
- Outfielder
- Born: August 29, 1939; St. Louis, Missouri, U.S.
- Died: February 25, 2023 (aged 83); Carmi, Illinois, U.S.
- Batted: Right Threw: Right

MLB debut
- May 24, 1960, for the Baltimore Orioles

Last MLB appearance
- October 1, 1967, for the Atlanta Braves

MLB statistics
- Batting average: .212
- Home runs: 61
- Runs batted in: 179
- Stats at Baseball Reference

Teams
- Baltimore Orioles (1960, 1962); Chicago White Sox (1963–1965); Houston Astros (1966); Atlanta Braves (1967)

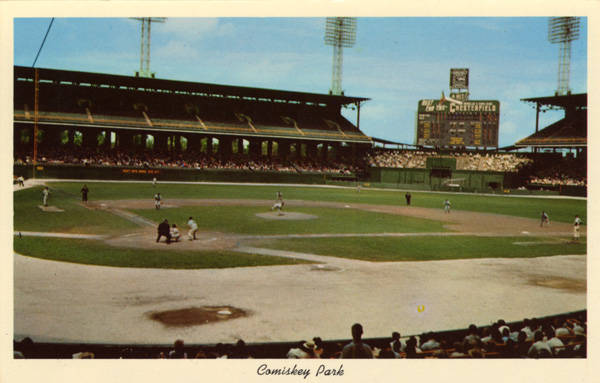
A 1954 postcard showing the height and width of Comiskey Park's left-field roof, which Nicholson cleared with a 573-foot home run in 1964.

David Lawrence Nicholson (August 29, 1939 – February 25, 2023) was an American professional baseball outfielder who played in Major League Baseball for the Baltimore Orioles (1960 and 1962), Chicago White Sox (1963–1965), Houston Astros (1966) and Atlanta Braves (1967). Nicholson was known for his towering, although infrequent, home runs. In 1964, he hit a home run measured at 573 feet (175 m) over the left-field roof of Chicago's Comiskey Park, one of the longest home runs in major league baseball history.

== Early life ==
Nicholson was born in St. Louis, Missouri, where he graduated from Southwest High School. He was signed as an amateur by the Orioles to a bonus contract, reportedly worth $105,000, on January 26, 1958.

== Baseball career ==
Nicholson threw and batted right-handed, and was listed as 6 feet 2 inches (1.88 m) tall and 215 pounds (98 kg). In 1959, his second season in the Baltimore farm system, Nicholson batted .298 for their Aberdeen Pheasants affiliate (managed by Earl Weaver) with 35 home runs, tied for the lead in the Class C Northern League.

The following year saw Nicholson promoted all the way to Triple-A, and his MLB debut on May 24, 1960 at age 20. Facing the White Sox at Comiskey Park, he went hitless with one walk in four plate appearances. He remained on the Baltimore roster all season and hit five home runs, but struck out 55 times in 133 trips to the plate.

He spent 1961 back in the minor leagues, mainly in the Double-A Southern Association, before being given a full-year audition with the 1962 Orioles. He played in 97 games, starting 80 of them in the outfield, but he batted only .173 with nine homers and 76 strikeouts in 202 plate appearances. On May 5, 1962, Nicholson was the last Orioles' batter of a no-hitter pitched by Bo Belinsky of the Los Angeles Angels, popping out to third base.

In January 1963, Baltimore traded Nicholson, future Baseball Hall of Fame pitcher Hoyt Wilhelm, and infielders Ron Hansen and Pete Ward to the Chicago White Sox for Hall of Fame shortstop Luis Aparicio and outfielder Al Smith. Nicholson had his best season in the majors in 1963, producing 103 hits with a career-high 22 home runs, but he struck out 175 times, setting a new MLB record. Strikeouts would prove to be Nicholson's Achilles heel during his big-league career; in 1964, his second consecutive season as the White Sox' regular left-fielder, he fanned 126 times, fifth in the American League. Over his career, he struck out 573 times in 1,662 plate appearances, once every 3.4 times he came to the plate.

=== 573 foot home run ===
On May 6, 1964, during the first game of a doubleheader at Comiskey Park, Nicholson hit a home run off Moe Drabowsky of the Kansas City Athletics that either bounced off the left-field roof or entirely cleared it. The ball was found across the street. Howie Roberts, the White Sox' traveling secretary, told the Associated Press: "If it had landed on the roof, it would have a visible bruise on it. It cleared the roof." The home run was officially measured at 573 feet (175 m). Nicholson homered three times in that doubleheader, although he would hit just 13 home runs during the entire 1964 season.

After the 1965 campaign, the White Sox traded Nicholson and catcher Bill Heath to the Houston Astros for pitcher Jack Lamabe and cash. The Astros traded Nicholson and Bob Bruce to the Atlanta Braves for Eddie Mathews, Arnold Umbach, and a player to be named later after the 1966 season.

For his MLB career, he played in 538 games and had 1,419 at bats, 184 runs, 301 hits, 32 doubles, 12 triples, 61 home runs, 179 RBI, six stolen bases, 219 walks, 540 total bases, four sacrifice hits, 12 sacrifice flies, and seven intentional walks. He compiled a .212 batting mark, .318 on-base percentage and a .381 slugging percentage.

== Death ==
Nicholson died in Carmi, Illinois, on February 25, 2023, at the age of 83.
