= Sherm Lollar =

American baseball player (1924–1977)

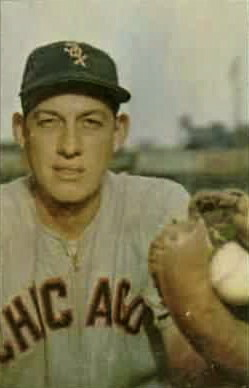
- Lollar c. 1953
- Catcher
- Born: August 23, 1924; Durham, Arkansas, U.S.
- Died: September 24, 1977 (aged 53); Springfield, Missouri, U.S.
- Batted: Right Threw: Right

MLB debut
- April 20, 1946, for the Cleveland Indians

Last MLB appearance
- September 7, 1963, for the Chicago White Sox

MLB statistics
- Batting average: .264
- Home runs: 155
- Runs batted in: 808
- Stats at Baseball Reference

Teams
- Cleveland Indians (1946); New York Yankees (1947–1948); St. Louis Browns (1949–1951); Chicago White Sox (1952–1963)

Career highlights and awards
- 9× All-Star (1950, 1954–1956, 1958–1960²); 2× World Series champion (1947, 1966); 3× Gold Glove Award (1957–1959)

John Sherman Lollar Jr. (August 23, 1924 – September 24, 1977) was an American professional baseball player and coach. He played in Major League Baseball as a catcher from 1946 to 1963, most prominently as a member of the Chicago White Sox where he was a perennial All-Star player and was an integral member of the 1959 American League pennant-winning team.

Although he was often overshadowed by his contemporary, New York Yankee catcher Yogi Berra, Lollar was considered to be one of the best catchers in the major leagues during the 1950s. Lollar began his career playing for the Cleveland Indians, New York Yankees, and the St. Louis Browns where he earned his first All-Star berth however, he blossomed as a player while with the White Sox. He was an American League All-Star for seven seasons. In 1957, Lollar received the first Rawlings Gold Glove Award for the catcher position in Major League Baseball.

Lollar became a coach in the major leagues and managed at the minor league level after his MLB playing career ended. He was chosen for the Chicago White Sox All-Century Team on September 30, 2000.

== Biography ==
Lollar was born in Durham, Arkansas in the rural Ozark mountains. He was a batboy for the Fayetteville, Arkansas Class D minor league team in the Arkansas–Missouri League in the 1930s. In 1943 Lollar was signed as an 18-year-old by the Baltimore Orioles, which then was a minor league franchise in the International League. In 1945 he hit 34 home runs and led the International League with a .364 batting average, winning the league's Most Valuable Player award. Baltimore had a working agreement with the Cleveland Indians, and sold Lollar to the Indians after the 1945 season.

=== MLB career ===
==== Cleveland Indians (1946) ====
Lollar made his major league debut on April 20, 1946. He was a backup catcher for the Cleveland Indians behind catchers Frankie Hayes and then Jim Hegan. His playing time as a third string catcher was minimal so, he requested to be sent back to the minor leagues.

==== New York Yankees (1947–1948) ====
Lollar was traded to the New York Yankees along with Ray Mack after the 1946 season, and competed with Yogi Berra in 1947 for the Yankee catching job. Both Lollar and Berra were considered excellent hitting prospects but defensive liabilities, although both eventually would become outstanding receivers. Lollar started two games in the 1947 World Series for the Yankees against the Brooklyn Dodgers and went 3 for 4 with two doubles. Yankee coach and Hall of Fame catching great, Bill Dickey, advised the Yankees that Berra's left-hand bat was more suited to the dimensions of Yankee Stadium (301'-457'-461'-407'-296' LF-LCF-CF-RCF-RF) than Lollar's right-hand bat. During the 1948 season, Lollar suffered a hand injury due to a foul tip, resulting in limited action for the rest of the year.

==== St. Louis Browns (1949–1951) ====
Lollar was traded to the St. Louis Browns and replaced Les Moss as their starting catcher for the 1949 season. In 1950, Lollar was hitting .314 in mid-July and earned his first of seven All-Star selections (nine total games). He ended the season hitting .280 with a career-high .391 on-base percentage. In 1951, Lollar hit .252 for the season and was traded to the White Sox that November.

==== Chicago White Sox (1952–1963) ====
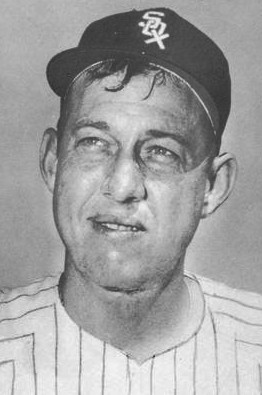
Lollar in 1958

In 1952, Lollar took over the season's regular catching job for the White Sox from catcher Phil Masi. His defensive skills improved under the tutelage of manager and former major league catcher Paul Richards. Lollar, whom Richards called "a manager on the field", was a quiet workhorse who led by example and was an excellent handler of pitchers. In 1954, after allowing a stolen base to Al Smith on May 25, he threw out all 18 would-be base stealers during the remainder of the year. He became a mainstay behind the plate for the Go-Go White Sox teams of the 1950s and early 1960s, which included future Hall of Fame members Luis Aparicio, Nellie Fox, George Kell, Hoyt Wilhelm, and Early Wynn.

Described as a dangerous hitter with power in Who's Who in Baseball History, Lollar played most of his career in cavernous Comiskey Park, whose dimensions were 352'-415'-352' LF-CF-RF. He tied a major League record on April 23, 1955 when he got hits twice in two different innings of the same game. Lollar never struck out more than 50 times in a season and walked more than he struck out in each of the 15 seasons he played after becoming an every day player. His career on-base percentage was higher than Berra's (.357 versus .348). He hit a career-high .293 with 28 doubles in 1956.

The White Sox finished in third place for five consecutive seasons until 1957, when the Sox held first place until late June, before finishing the season in second place behind the Yankees. Lollar won the first Gold Glove Award for catcher in 1957, which initially had one recipient per position for both leagues. That year he caught Bob Keegan's no-hitter on August 20. In 1958, the White Sox would battle back from being in last place on June 14 to once again finish the season in second place behind the Yankees. Lollar led the team with 20 home runs and 84 runs batted in.

In 1959, the White Sox won their first American League pennant since the Black Sox scandal in 1919, finishing the regular season five games ahead of the Cleveland Indians. Lollar helped guide the White Sox pitching staff to the lowest earned run average in the American League. He also led the team once again with a career-high 22 home runs and 84 runs batted in and winning his third consecutive Gold Glove Award. He had 5 hits and 5 runs batted in, including a home run, in the 1959 World Series, as the White Sox were defeated by the Los Angeles Dodgers in a six-game series.

Lollar remained the White Sox starting catcher through the 1962 season. In 1962, he fractured his thumb on June 20 when he was hit by a pitch by Ted Sadowski of the Minnesota Twins. He did not return until July 25, and appeared in only 84 total games during the season. Lollar retired from playing at the end of the 1963 season at the age of 38.

Ned Garver enjoyed working with Lollar, recalling that he would often pitch entire games throwing the first pitch Lollar flashed a sign for.

== Hall of Fame eligibility ==
In The Case for Those Overlooked by the Baseball Hall of Fame, published in 1992, Lollar was named as one of 32 former major league players considered worthy of Hall of Fame consideration. Ten of the book's players have since been enshrined in the Hall of Fame: Richie Ashburn, Orlando Cepeda, Larry Doby, Nellie Fox, Bill Mazeroski, Hal Newhouser, Ron Santo, Minnie Miñoso, Tony Oliva, and Gil Hodges. Lollar is one of 36 catchers who are portrayed in Thomas Owens’ Great Catchers.

Lollar is currently eligible to be identified as a Golden Era ballot candidate in November 2017 by the Baseball Writers' Association of America's-appointed Historical Overview Committee (screening committee of 10-12 BBWAA members). If he is selected for the Golden Era ballot list of 10 candidates, he is eligible for consideration for election to the Hall of Fame in December 2017 by the 16-member Golden Era Committee, under the Hall of Fame's, Golden Era rules for election for players.

== MLB stats and highlights ==
In an eighteen-year major league career, Lollar played in 1,752 games, accumulating 1,415 hits in 5,351 at bats for a .264 career batting average along with 155 home runs, 808 runs batted in and a .357 on-base percentage. A seven-time All-Star, Lollar led American League catchers in fielding percentage four times over his career. In 1961, he committed only one error over the entire season. At the time of his retirement in 1963, Lollar's .992 career fielding percentage was the highest for a catcher in major league history. During his career, Lollar threw out 46.18% of the base runners who tried steal a base on him, ranking him 5th on the all-time list. He caught 110 shutouts during his career, ranking him 21st all-time among major league catchers. At the time of his retirement in 1963, he ranked 9th all-time in career home runs by catchers.

Years	Games	AB	Runs	Hits	2B	3B	HR	RBI	SB	W	SO	OBP	SLG	BA	Fld%
18	1752	5351	623	1415	244	14	155	808	20	671	453	.357	.402	.264	.992

- All Star (AL): 1950, 1955, 1956, 1958, 1959-2, 1960-2
- American League leader in fielding percentage for catcher: 1951, 1953, 1956, 1960, 1961
- Gold Glove Award (ML): 1957
- Gold Glove Award (AL): 1958, 1959
- Major League record: .992 fielding average as catcher
- Chicago White Sox All-Century Team: 2000

== Coaching and minor league managing career ==
Lollar was hired as the bullpen coach for the Baltimore Orioles on November 27, 1963. He remained in that capacity through the 1966 World Series championship season until the announcement on September 28, 1967, that he would not be retained for the 1968 season. He subsequently was a coach for the Oakland Athletics in 1968, and managed the Athletics' minor league affiliates the Iowa Oaks and the Tucson Toros in the 1970s. Lollar eventually owned a bowling alley in Springfield, Missouri, where he died of cancer at age 53 on September 24, 1977.

== See also ==
- List of AL Gold Glove winners at catcher
