= Jim Landis =

American baseball player (1934–2017)

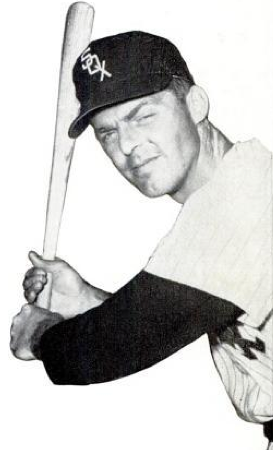
- Landis in 1962
- Center fielder
- Born: March 9, 1934; Fresno, California, U.S.
- Died: October 7, 2017 (aged 83); Napa, California, U.S.
- Batted: Right Threw: Right

MLB debut
- April 16, 1957, for the Chicago White Sox

Last MLB appearance
- August 27, 1967, for the Boston Red Sox

MLB statistics
- Batting average: .247
- Home runs: 93
- Runs batted in: 467
- Stats at Baseball Reference

Teams
- Chicago White Sox (1957–1964); Kansas City Athletics (1965); Cleveland Indians (1966); Houston Astros (1967); Detroit Tigers (1967); Boston Red Sox (1967)

Career highlights and awards
- 2× All-Star (1962, 1962²); 5× Gold Glove Award (1960–1964)

James Henry Landis (March 9, 1934 – October 7, 2017) was an American professional baseball player. Landis played in Major League Baseball (MLB) as a center fielder on six teams from 1957 through 1967. While playing eight seasons for the Chicago White Sox, he was an American League (AL) All-Star in 1962 and an AL Gold Glove Award winner five consecutive seasons. Landis is considered to be one of the best defensive center fielders in major-league history.

Landis attended Richmond High School in Richmond, California where he starred in baseball as a third baseman and Contra Costa College in San Pablo, California. He was signed by the White Sox as an amateur free agent in 1952. Landis served in the U.S. Army during the Korean Conflict in 1954 and 1955, and was stationed in Alaska before beginning his major league career.

== Major League career ==
Landis began his career in the major leagues playing for the Chicago White Sox in 1957, where he remained for seven more seasons. He helped the "Go-Go White Sox" win the 1959 American League Pennant, hitting .272 with 26 doubles. He led the American League that season with 13 sacrifice hits and 426 and 420 putouts as a center fielder and an outfielder, and hit .292 during the 1959 World Series against the Los Angeles Dodgers.

In the 1960 season, he hit .253 and had 23 stolen bases. In 1961, he hit .283 with 22 home runs, 8 triples, 85 RBIs, and won his first of five consecutive American League Gold Glove Awards. In 1962, he played in two All-Star games. In 1963, Landis led the American League in fielding with a .993 fielding average both as a center fielder and an outfielder.

Landis was traded on January 20, 1965 to the Kansas City Athletics, where he played one season. He also played one season for the Cleveland Indians in 1966. In 1967, he finished his 11-year major league career playing for three teams: The Houston Astros, Detroit Tigers, and the Boston Red Sox.

Known more for his defensive abilities, Landis posted a .989 fielding percentage at all three outfield positions in his major league career.

== Later years ==
Landis went into the safety sign business for several years after playing professional baseball and also coached for Babe Ruth League baseball. He made his home in Napa, California, with his wife Sandy (née Foster).

== Death ==
Landis died from lung cancer at his home in Napa on October 7, 2017, the day after his 61st wedding anniversary, following a 3-month illness. He was 83.

== Legacy ==
The Chicago White Sox announced on September 30, 2000, that Jim Landis and 26 other former and active White Sox players were members of the Chicago White Sox All-Century Team. He was honored by fans in Chicago as "The Best All-Time Chicago Center Fielder".

Landis was mentioned in a 1991 episode of the 6th season of Married... with Children, "If I Could See Me Now". As Al watches TV, the announcer asks a sports trivia question, "Who played centerfield for the '59 White Sox?" Al correctly gives Landis' name.
