= Sammy Esposito =

American baseball player (1931–2018)

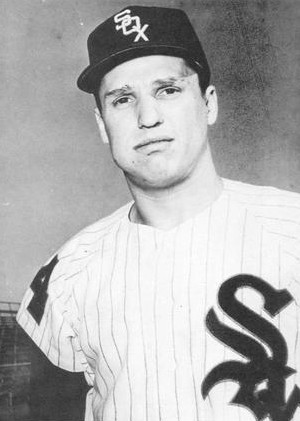
- Third baseman / Shortstop
- Born: December 15, 1931; Chicago, Illinois, U.S.
- Died: July 9, 2018 (aged 86); Newland, North Carolina, U.S.
- Batted: Right Threw: Right

MLB debut
- September 28, 1952, for the Chicago White Sox

Last MLB appearance
- August 23, 1963, for the Kansas City Athletics

MLB statistics
- Batting average: .207
- Home runs: 8
- Runs batted in: 73
- Stats at Baseball Reference

Teams
- Chicago White Sox (1952, 1955–1963); Kansas City Athletics (1963)

Samuel Esposito (December 15, 1931 – July 9, 2018) was an American professional baseball third baseman and shortstop. He played in Major League Baseball (MLB) for 10 seasons on the Chicago White Sox (1952, 1955–1963) and Kansas City Athletics (1963). In 1959, he helped the White Sox win the American League pennant. He was the head baseball coach at North Carolina State University from 1967 to 1987. He was also an assistant coach on the North Carolina State basketball team that won the 1974 NCAA Championship.

He graduated from Chicago's Christian Fenger High School and attended briefly Indiana University.

Esposito threw and batted right-handed, stood 5 feet 9 inches (1.75 m) tall and weighed 165 pounds (75 kg).

In ten MLB seasons, he played in 560 games and had 792 at bats, 130 runs, 164 hits, 27 doubles, 2 triples, 8 home runs, 73 RBI, 7 stolen bases, 145 walks, a .207 batting average, .330 on-base percentage, .277 slugging percentage, 219 total bases, 21 sacrifice hits, 8 sacrifice flies and 4 intentional walks.

Esposito replaced starting third baseman Billy Goodman and batted twice in Game 1 of the 1959 World Series against the Los Angeles Dodgers, going 0-for-2.
