= Brian McCall (baseball) =

American baseball player (born 1943)

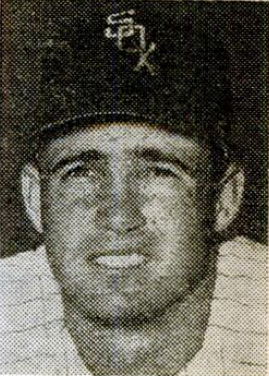
- McCall in 1963
- Outfielder
- Born: January 25, 1943 (age 83); Kentfield, California, U.S.
- Batted: Left Threw: Left

MLB debut
- September 18, 1962, for the Chicago White Sox

Last MLB appearance
- September 29, 1963, for the Chicago White Sox

MLB statistics
- Batting average: .200
- Home runs: 2
- Runs batted in: 3
- Stats at Baseball Reference

Teams
- Chicago White Sox (1962–1963)

Brian Allen McCall (born January 25, 1943) is an American former professional baseball player, an outfielder who appeared in seven Major League Baseball games for the Chicago White Sox in 1962–1963. McCall batted and threw left-handed, stood 5 feet 10 inches (1.78 m) tall and weighed 170 pounds (77 kg).

McCall registered only three hits in 15 at bats during his big league trials — all of the hits coming during the closing weekend of the 1962 regular season against the American League and eventual World Series champion New York Yankees at Yankee Stadium. On Friday, September 28, the 19-year-old McCall hit a pinch single off Tex Clevenger in the ninth inning of a 7–3 loss. Then, on Sunday, McCall started in center field and hit two home runs (off Bill Stafford and Ralph Terry) in five at-bats, knocking in three runs — the only runs batted in of his Major League career — as the White Sox triumphed, 8–4. McCall's professional career extended from 1961 to 1966.

After retiring from baseball McCall became a 3-D artist.
