= Dom Zanni =

American baseball player (1932–2017)

- Pitcher
- Born: March 1, 1932; The Bronx, New York, U.S.
- Died: July 6, 2017 (aged 85); Massapequa, New York, U.S.
- Batted: Right Threw: Right

MLB debut
- September 28, 1958, for the San Francisco Giants

Last MLB appearance
- October 1, 1966, for the Cincinnati Reds

MLB statistics
- Win–loss record: 9–6
- Earned run average: 3.79
- Strikeouts: 148
- Stats at Baseball Reference

Teams
- San Francisco Giants (1958–1959, 1961); Chicago White Sox (1962–1963); Cincinnati Reds (1963, 1965–1966)

Dominick Thomas Zanni (March 1, 1932 – July 6, 2017) was an American pitcher in Major League Baseball who played for the San Francisco Giants, Chicago White Sox and Cincinnati Reds in all or parts of seven seasons spanning 1958–1966. Listed at 5' 11", 180 lb., he batted and threw right handed.

Born in The Bronx, New York, Zanni was signed by his home team New York Giants as an amateur free agent before the 1951 season. Over the following seasons, Zanni moved up the minor league baseball ranks. On June 5, 1954, Zanni pitched a no-hitter for the Sioux City Cowboys of the Western League. In 1956, Zanni was a spring training roster invitee, but was sent back to the minors before the season started. He spent the following seasons with the Louisville Colonels and the Phoenix Giants, and helped lead the Giants to the Pacific Coast League championship in 1958.

This led to his Major League debut on September 28. He faced the St. Louis Cardinals, pitching four innings and allowing one run, earning the victory as the Giants won 7–2.

Zanni spent the offseason in the Dominican League, then was back on the Giants' roster for the 1959 season. During the season, he pitched in 11 innings in nine games, striking out 11. After playing nine games and having an earned run average (ERA) of 6.55, he was sent back to Phoenix. Zanni spent the rest of the 1959 and 1960 seasons with the Tacoma Giants (formerly the Phoenix Giants), then spent the 1960 offseason in the Puerto Rican League, earning an ERA of 2.73 with six victories and no losses. After spending part of the 1961 season with Tacoma, where Zanni had a 2.65 ERA and an 8–4 record, he was called up to the San Francisco Giants' Major League roster on July 22, 1961. He went on to pitch eight games during the 1961 San Francisco Giants season, winning a game and posting an ERA of 3.75. After the season ended, on November 30 Zanni was traded along with player to be named later (Verle Tiefenthaler), Bob Farley, and Eddie Fisher to the Chicago White Sox for Billy Pierce and Don Larsen.

The 1962 Chicago White Sox season ended up being Zanni's most productive season in his Major League career. He pitched a career-high 44 games over 86 innings, winning six games and losing five with an ERA of 3.75. This season was also the closest Zanni got to pitching a complete game. On June 22, 1962, in a game against the Kansas City Athletics, Zanni relieved Joe Horlen, who left the game due to injury before getting anyone out. In the seventh inning of the same game, he was knocked unconscious in a collision while covering first base, and went on to finish the game, pitching all nine innings in a 5–1 victory for the White Sox. He pitched in five games for the White Sox the following season. On May 5, 1963, he was traded to the Cincinnati Reds for Jim Brosnan.

Zanni played 31 games with the Reds in its 1963 season, finishing 16 of them and earning five saves and finishing with an ERA of 4.19. During the 1965 season, called up after the minor league season was over, he pitched in eight games and had 13 innings pitched, allowing two earned runs. The following season, he was again called up in September, and did not allow a run during the five games he pitched. His final Major League game was October 1, 1966. He played for the minor league Buffalo Bisons in 1967 before retiring.

After baseball, he spent 27 years in the insurance business before retiring to Massapequa, New York on Long Island.

Zanni died in 2017 in Massapequa at the age of 85.
