= Frank Baumann (baseball) =

American baseball player (1933–2020)

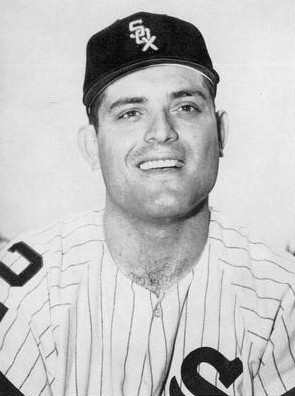
- Pitcher
- Born: July 1, 1933; St. Louis, Missouri, U.S.
- Died: December 13, 2020 (aged 87); St. Louis, Missouri, U.S.
- Batted: Left Threw: Left

MLB debut
- July 31, 1955, for the Boston Red Sox

Last MLB appearance
- May 8, 1965, for the Chicago Cubs

MLB statistics
- Win–loss record: 45–38
- Earned run average: 4.11
- Strikeouts: 384
- Stats at Baseball Reference

Teams
- Boston Red Sox (1955–1959); Chicago White Sox (1960–1964); Chicago Cubs (1965)

Career highlights and awards
- AL ERA leader (1960)

Frank Matt Baumann (July 1, 1933 – December 13, 2020) was an American pitcher in Major League Baseball who played for the Boston Red Sox, Chicago White Sox and Chicago Cubs between 1955 and 1965. He batted and threw left-handed, stood 6 feet (1.8 m) tall and weighed 205 pounds (93 kg).

Baumann signed with the Red Sox in 1952 out of high school in his native St. Louis, receiving a $90,000 bonus from owner Tom Yawkey, who nicknamed him "Beau". He won 10 of 11 decisions for the Triple-A Louisville Colonels in 1953, his second season in professional baseball, before being drafted into United States Army service during the Korean War.

When he mustered out of the Army in mid-1955, he joined the MLB Red Sox in late July. In his debut, he earned a victory with 52/3 innings of scoreless relief, as Boston defeated the Detroit Tigers, 3–2. But an arm injury incurred during his military service hampered his Red Sox tenure. He needed return trips to the minor leagues from 1956 to 1958 before making the Red Sox roster for the full 1959 campaign. Then, that November, he was traded to the White Sox for first baseman Ron Jackson.

In 1960, as a member of the defending American League champions, he had a 13–6 mark for the White Sox, and led AL pitchers with a 2.67 ERA. In 47 games pitched, including 20 starts, he compiled seven complete games and two shutouts. He added four saves as a relief pitcher. But he followed in 1961 with a disappointing 10–13 record, led the AL in earned runs allowed, and his ERA ballooned by almost three full runs, to 5.61. His effectiveness largely returned in 1962, but thereafter he made only one more start over his final two years with the ChiSox and in 1964 he again struggled on the mound. His ERA climbed to 6.19, and Baumann was traded to the cross-town Cubs during the off-season. He made four appearances out of the Cub bullpen in 1965, posted an ERA over 7.00, and was sent to Triple-A during the May roster cutdown from 28 to 25 men. His active career concluded after that season.

In his 11-season MLB career, Baumann posted a 45–38 record with a 4.11 ERA and 14 saves in 244 games pitched. Of his 78 starting assignments, 19 were complete gates and four were shutouts. In 7971/3 innings pitched, he allowed 856 hits and 300 base on balls, with 384 strikeouts.

Baumann died on December 13, 2020, in St. Louis, Missouri.
