= Ray Herbert =

American baseball player (1929–2022)

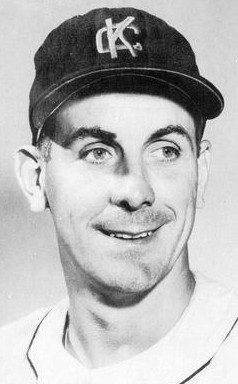
- Pitcher
- Born: December 15, 1929; Detroit, Michigan, U.S.
- Died: December 20, 2022 (aged 93); Plymouth, Michigan, U.S.
- Batted: Right Threw: Right

MLB debut
- August 27, 1950, for the Detroit Tigers

Last MLB appearance
- September 17, 1966, for the Philadelphia Phillies

MLB statistics
- Win–loss record: 104–107
- Earned run average: 4.01
- Strikeouts: 864
- Stats at Baseball Reference

Teams
- Detroit Tigers (1950–1951, 1953–1954); Kansas City Athletics (1955, 1958–1961); Chicago White Sox (1961–1964); Philadelphia Phillies (1965–1966)

Career highlights and awards
- All-Star (1962²)

Raymond Ernest Herbert (December 15, 1929 – December 20, 2022) was an American professional baseball pitcher. He appeared in 407 Major League Baseball (MLB) games over 14 seasons (1950–1951; 1953–1955; 1958–1966) with the Detroit Tigers, Kansas City Athletics, Chicago White Sox and Philadelphia Phillies. After his retirement, he would throw batting practice for the Tigers for over three decades.

== Early life ==
First noticed by baseball scout Wish Egan at a local sandlot in Detroit, Herbert signed with his hometown Tigers after attending Detroit Catholic Central High School. Herbert won two high school league championships, eventually being inducted in 2008 to the school's hall of fame. He was a father to five children.

== Professional career ==
=== Minor leagues ===
After prepping with the Triple-A Toledo Mud Hens in 1949–50, Herbert received his first MLB trial in August 1950.

=== Detroit Tigers 1950–1954 ===
In his major league debut, he started against the Philadelphia Athletics at Shibe Park. He worked into the eighth inning, and was holding a 3–2 lead when he surrendered a two-run home run to Sam Chapman. Herbert was tagged with the loss, although he registered an eight-inning complete game. In 1951, he made the Tigers out of spring training and appeared in five early-season games, all in relief; he was the winning pitcher in four of those contests, and compiled a low 1.42 earned run average in 122/3 innings pitched. Herbert then joined the military for Korean War service, missing the rest of 1951 and all of 1952.

When Herbert returned to the Tigers in 1953–54, he got into 85 games, mostly in relief, winning seven of 19 decisions and posting a 5.55 ERA in 172 innings pitched.

=== Kansas City Athletics and minor leagues 1955–1961 ===
On May 11, 1955, Herbert's contract was purchased by the Athletics during their first season in Kansas City. Herbert continued to struggle, however, winning one game and losing eight in 23 games split almost evenly between starting and relieving. He then spent 1956 and 1957 back in Triple-A. Finally, in 1958, at age 28, Herbert returned to the Major Leagues. He won 36 games while losing 40 for Kansas City (for a winning percentage of .474) before being traded to the first-division White Sox on June 10, 1961.

=== Chicago White Sox 1961–1964 ===
Herbert's 31/2 years with the ChiSox were his most successful. He went 48–32 (.600) in 109 games (all but two as a starter) and 7102/3 innings pitched. In 1962, he had his best campaign, winning 20 games (losing nine) and making the American League All-Star Team. Appearing in the second All-Star Game held that summer, on July 30, 1962, at Wrigley Field, Herbert hurled three scoreless innings of relief and was credited with the victory when the AL broke a 1–1 deadlock and went on to a 9–4 triumph. It would be the Junior Circuit's last All-Star win until 1971. The following season, he led the 1963 American League in shutouts thrown, with seven. His workload was reduced in 1964, but went 6–7 with a 3.47 ERA in 19 starts.

=== Philadelphia Phillies 1965–1966 ===
Herbert was traded to the National League Philadelphia Phillies that offseason, where he worked as a spot starter in 1965 (notching four complete games) and as a reliever in 1966, his last year in baseball.

== Player profile ==
Herbert threw and batted right-handed, stood 5 feet 11 inches (1.80 m) tall and weighed 185 pounds (84 kg). His fastball was described as a "sinking fastball that major league franchises dream of" and was also known to be a powerful batter at the plate, hitting 7 home runs in his career.

In 407 career big-league games, Herbert had a win–loss record of 104–107 with 68 complete games, 13 shutouts and 15 saves. In 1,8811/3 total innings pitched, he allowed an even 2,000 hits and 571 bases on balls; he struck out 864. A competent hitter, he batted .192 lifetime with 109 hits, 21 doubles, seven home runs and 51 runs batted in. Defensively, he recorded a .975 fielding percentage, which was 17 points higher than the league average at his position.

== Death ==
Herbert died after a long battle with Alzheimer's disease in Plymouth, Michigan, on December 20, 2022, at the age of 93.
