= Al Smith (outfielder) =

American baseball player (1928–2002)

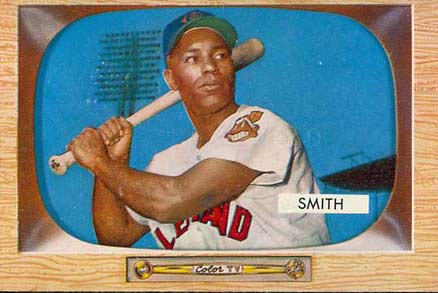
- Outfielder
- Born: February 7, 1928; Kirkwood, Missouri, U.S.
- Died: January 3, 2002 (aged 73); Hammond, Indiana, U.S.
- Batted: Right Threw: Right

Professional debut
- NgL: 1946, for the Cleveland Buckeyes
- MLB: July 10, 1953, for the Cleveland Indians

Last MLB appearance
- October 4, 1964, for the Boston Red Sox

MLB statistics
- Batting average: .272
- Home runs: 168
- Runs batted in: 697
- Stats at Baseball Reference

Teams
- Negro leagues: Cleveland Buckeyes (1946–1948); Major League Baseball: Cleveland Indians (1953–1957); Chicago White Sox (1958–1962); Baltimore Orioles (1963); Cleveland Indians (1964); Boston Red Sox (1964)

Career highlights and awards
- 3× All-Star (1955, 1960, 1960²)

Alphonse Eugene Smith (February 7, 1928 – January 3, 2002) was an American professional baseball player who was an outfielder and third baseman in Major League Baseball (MLB). He played for twelve seasons on the Cleveland Indians (1953–57, 1964), Chicago White Sox (1958–62), Baltimore Orioles (1963) and Boston Red Sox (1964). In 2003, he was selected as one of the "100 Greatest Indians".

Smith was an All-Star for two seasons. In 1955, he batted .306 and led the American League (AL) in four categories: 154 games played, 725 plate appearances, 294 times on base, and 123 runs scored. In 1993, Smith was enshrined in the Greater Akron Baseball Hall of Fame of Ohio.

== Early years ==
Smith, nicknamed "Fuzzy" by his friends as a teenager when he was the first of them to sprout a beard, was born in Kirkwood, Missouri, and attended Douglass High School in Webster Groves. As a high school star in St. Louis, Smith scored ten touchdowns in a school football game and was a Golden Gloves boxing champion.

== Baseball career ==
Smith posted a lifetime .272 batting average with 1,458 hits, 164 home runs, 676 RBIs, and also had a .959 fielding average. A good, selective hitter, he compiled a .407 on-base percentage in 1955, his best season. He played six different positions during his 12-year career.

Smith started his professional baseball career in the Negro leagues in 1946 with the Cleveland Buckeyes. He joined the Cleveland Indians in 1949, and began his major league career with Cleveland in 1953. Smith was an outstanding defensive left fielder, he earned two AL All-Star selections in 1955 and 1960 (two All-Star Games were played). He is best remembered as the focal point of one of the most famous baseball photographs (see White Sox, below)

=== Cleveland Indians ===
An everyday player in 1954, Smith was a member of the Indians team that won a then-American League record 111 games. Batting from the leadoff spot, he responded with a .281 average, 101 runs, 186 hits, 11 home runs and 59 RBIs. He led off the World Series against the New York Giants with a home run. In 1955, he hit .306 with 22 home runs and 77 RBIs.

=== Chicago White Sox ===
In December 1957, Smith was traded by Cleveland along with Early Wynn to the Chicago White Sox for Minnie Miñoso and Fred Hatfield, in a deal that was very unpopular among Chicago fans due to Minoso being a popular figure among White Sox fans. He slumped in the 1958 season with the White Sox to the point that eccentric owner Bill Veeck would hold an "Al Smith Night" on August 26 of the following year to honor his outfielder. Anyone named Smith, Smythe, Schmidt, or Smithe was admitted free and given a button that said, "I'm a Smith and I'm for Al." On his big night, Smith went one-for-four, hitting into two easy outs with runners in scoring position. To add insult to injury, in the seventh inning, with a runner on second for Boston, Smith made an error on a fly ball hit by Vic Wertz. A subsequent walk led to the replacement of starter Early Wynn, and Gerry Staley would implode what was a 2-1 lead for the White Sox into a 5-2 deficit on two hits and a sacrifice fly, and the White Sox eventually lost 7-6; at any rate, the White Sox held consistent for the remainder of the year to win 94 total games and win their first American League pennant in four decades.

This made Smith the only position player to be a starter (525+ plate appearances) on both non-Yankee AL pennant-winners in the Yankees’ 16-year (1949-64) run of 14 pennants (Al Lopez managed both teams).

Gora's famous photograph of Smith

It was during the 1959 World Series that Smith would enter baseball journalism history. In Game 2 at Comiskey Park, Smith retreated to the left field wall in pursuit of a long drive hit by Charlie Neal of the Los Angeles Dodgers. As Smith watched the ball sail into the third row seats for a home run, a fan (Melvin Piehl, an executive for a motor-oil company) seated in the first row trying to catch the ball, accidentally tipped over his cup of beer, dousing Smith's head and face. Smith estimated that he signed photographs depicting that moment at least 200,000 times, and without making a cent on it. The best-known photograph of the incident was taken by Chicago Tribune staff photographer John Raymond Gora, who died in 2003.

In 1960, Smith won the respect of the fans by hitting a career-high .315 and making the league All-Star team. In 1961, he slugged a career-high 28 home runs, and led the White Sox in home runs that season. In 1962, he hit .292, and again led the White Sox with 16 home runs. He was traded to the Baltimore Orioles at age 35.

=== Final seasons ===
Smith was sent to the Baltimore Orioles before the 1963 season with Luis Aparicio in the same transaction that brought Hoyt Wilhelm, Dave Nicholson, Pete Ward and Ron Hansen to the White Sox. His last major league season was in 1964, when he divided his playing time between the Cleveland Indians and the Boston Red Sox.

== Post-playing career ==
Following his baseball career, Smith became manager of the Chicago park district's baseball program, from 1966 through 1981. He also was the supervisor of recreation for Ogden Park, Illinois and worked part-time as a community relations representative for the White Sox. Smith died in 2002, at the age of 73 in Hammond, Indiana.

In his 2010 Gold Mine, Bill James compared Smith to contemporary player Melvin Mora, and wondered if Smith was still well known enough to warrant an English Wikipedia page. (Smith's page was created in 2006.)

== See also ==
- List of Negro league baseball players who played in Major League Baseball
- List of Major League Baseball annual runs scored leaders
