= Juan Pizarro (baseball) =

Puerto Rican baseball player (1937–2021)

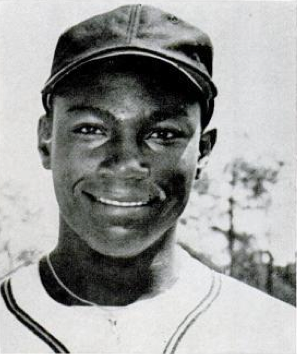
- Pizarro with the Milwaukee Braves in 1957
- Pitcher
- Born: February 7, 1937; Santurce, Puerto Rico
- Died: February 18, 2021 (aged 84); Carolina, Puerto Rico
- Batted: Left Threw: Left

MLB debut
- May 4, 1957, for the Milwaukee Braves

Last MLB appearance
- September 26, 1974, for the Pittsburgh Pirates

MLB statistics
- Win–loss record: 131–105
- Earned run average: 3.43
- Strikeouts: 1,522
- Stats at Baseball Reference

Teams
- Milwaukee Braves (1957–1960); Chicago White Sox (1961–1966); Pittsburgh Pirates (1967–1968); Boston Red Sox (1968–1969); Cleveland Indians (1969); Oakland Athletics (1969); Chicago Cubs (1970–1973); Houston Astros (1973); Pittsburgh Pirates (1974)

Career highlights and awards
- 2× All-Star (1963, 1964); World Series champion (1957)

Juan Ramón Pizarro a.k.a. "Terín" (February 7, 1937 – February 18, 2021) was a Puerto Rican Major League Baseball (MLB) pitcher. He played for 18 seasons on 9 teams, from 1957 through 1974. In 1964, he won 19 games (19–9) and pitched 4 shutouts for the Chicago White Sox. He was selected for the Major League All-Star Baseball game in 1963 and 1964. After his run in MLB, Pizarro played in the Dominican Republic and Mexico.

== Early years ==
Pizarro (birth name:Juan Ramon Pizarro Cordova) was born in Santurce, Puerto Rico. He began his baseball career in 1955 in Puerto Rico as a pitcher for the Cangrejeros de Santurce. In the 1976 Caribbean Series, Pizarro blanked Mexico, becoming the first to record no score games in two different decades. During the 1957–1958 Winter League of Puerto Rico of the Liga de Béisbol Profesional de Puerto Rico (Puerto Rico Baseball League), he played for the Criollos de Caguas and was selected as the Most Valuable Player of the season. In 1958, Pizarro struck out 17 players against Panama, establishing a Caribbean Series record. From 1959 to 1960 he pitched for the last time in Puerto Rico for the Cangrejeros del Santurce. At the time of his retirement, he led the LBPPR in strikeouts (1,804) having struck at least 100 batters in six seasons and also led in no score games (46). A Triple Crown and MVP winner, Juan Pizarro has the record for most shutouts in a season with 9 and is the only pitcher to lead in wins at three different decades (1957-58, 1963-64 and 1972-73).

== Milwaukee Braves ==
Pizarro signed with the Milwaukee Braves as an amateur free agent in 1956. After going 27–6 with a 2.06 earned run average in the minors, he made his major league debut on May 4, 1957, against the Pittsburgh Pirates at 20 years of age. He pitched seven strong innings, giving up only one run, however, the Braves managed only two hits off opposing pitcher Vern Law, and Pizarro lost his debut, 1–0. For the season, he went 5–6 with a 4.62 ERA. The Braves beat the New York Yankees in a seven-game World Series that year; Pizarro's only appearance came in Milwaukee's 12–3 loss in game three.

He split 1958 between Milwaukee and the triple A Wichita Braves, and was again included on the Braves' post-season roster as they faced the Yankees in the World Series for the second year in a row. This time the Yankees won the Series in seven games. Pizarro's only appearance again came in a loss in game five.

Pizarro remained with the Braves through 1960, compiling a 23–19 record and 3.93 ERA in Milwaukee. On December 15, 1960, he was traded with Joey Jay to the Cincinnati Reds for Roy McMillan, then immediately sent by the Reds with Cal McLish to the Chicago White Sox for Gene Freese.

== Chicago White Sox ==
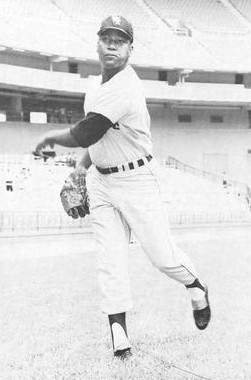
Pizarro with the White Sox in 1965.

Pizarro enjoyed his greatest success as a member of the White Sox. In 1961, despite being the youngest pitcher in the starting rotation, Pizarro emerged as the staff's ace, leading the Chisox with fourteen wins, 188 strikeouts and 194.2 innings pitched. He also made fourteen appearances out of the bullpen, and earned his first career save on August 27. He was given the opening day nod in 1962, and pitched a complete game 2–1 victory over the Los Angeles Angels. In 1963, he was named to the American League All-Star roster, and pitched a scoreless seventh inning during the All-Star Game.

Pizarro's best season was 1964, when he went 19–9 with a 2.56 ERA and four shutouts. Coincidentally, it was also his best season with the bat, as he batted .211 with a career high three home runs and career high 15 runs batted in.

From there, things rapidly deteriorated for him. Injuries limited Pizarro to just eighteen starts in 1965. In 1966, he was used primarily in relief. Despite a respectable 8–6 record and 3.76 ERA in 34 appearances, he pitched only 88.2 innings. Following the season, he was purchased by the Pittsburgh Pirates.

== Journeyman ==
Though he made nine starts for the 1967 Pirates, he was mainly a relief pitcher, earning a career high nine saves. He was limited to "mop up duty" by manager Larry Shepard in 1968. He appeared in twelve games with the Pirates prior to being placed on waivers; eleven were losses. The one win, Pizarro entered the game with the Pirates trailing, and earned the win himself.

The Boston Red Sox claimed Pizarro off waivers on June 27. He was used primarily as a starter in Boston, going 6–6 with six complete games as a starter. He also earned two saves for the Bosox. He was traded along with Ken Harrelson and Dick Ellsworth from the Red Sox to the Cleveland Indians for Sonny Siebert, Vicente Romo and Joe Azcue on April 19, 1969. Toward the end of the season, he was placed on waivers and claimed by the Oakland Athletics.

After beginning the 1970 season with Oakland's triple A affiliate, Pizarro was released and signed a minor league contract with the California Angels. He was 9–0 for the Hawaii Islanders when the Angels dealt him to the Chicago Cubs for Archie Reynolds.

== Chicago Cubs ==
On September 11, 1971, he shut out the St. Louis Cardinals at Wrigley Field. In his next start, he shutout Tom Seaver and the New York Mets 1–0 at Shea Stadium. The one run was a solo shot by Pizarro in the eighth inning. Seaver had won seven in a row at that point. His previous loss came on August 1, also courtesy of a complete game by Pizarro. It would be more than 40 years before another starting pitcher broke a scoreless tie by hitting a home run in the eighth inning or later: Clayton Kershaw of the Dodgers did this, also in the eighth inning, on Opening Day 2013.

For the 1971 season, Pizarro went 7–6 with a 3.46 ERA. He was 4–5 with a 3.94 ERA in 1972. He spent most of the first half of the 1973 season assigned to the Cubs' triple A affiliate, the Wichita Aeros. After a blown save against the Atlanta Braves on June 17, Pizarro was placed on waivers. He was claimed by the Houston Astros on July 8.

== Return to the post season ==
Pizarro was 2–2 with a 6.56 ERA out of Houston's bullpen in 1973. He was released the following Spring, and rejoined the Pittsburgh Pirates. The Pirates won the National League East by a game and a half over the St. Louis Cardinals, allowing Pizarro to return to the post season for the first time since 1958. His only appearance in the 1974 National League Championship Series came in the fourth game, which the Los Angeles Dodgers won to head to the 1974 World Series.

== Death ==
Pizarro was inducted to the Puerto Rico Sports Hall of Fame in 1986, the Puerto Rican Baseball Hall of Fame in 1992 and the Caribbean Series Hall of Fame in 2000. He is also a member of the regional hall of the municipality of Santurce. Pizarro died from cancer on February 18, 2021.

== Legacy ==
Looking at his entire professional career, Pizarro won more than 400 ballgames. His regular-season count is 392: 197 in the US (131 in the majors and 66 in the minors), plus 38 more in Mexico in his late 30s and 157 while playing winter ball in his homeland. His final record in Puerto Rico was 157–110, with a superb 2.51 ERA. Only Rubén Gómez had more wins (174, and he needed 29 seasons to do it). Pizarro pitched 2,403 innings, again second behind Gomez, and allowed just 1,980 hits. He is the PRWL's all-time leader in strikeouts (1,804) and shutouts (46), marks that will almost certainly never be challenged.

Pizarro was inducted into the Hall of Fame of the Caribbean Confederation and the Puerto Rican Sports Hall of Fame.

== Major-league career stats ==
Years	W	L	PCT	ERA	G	GS	CG	SHO	SV	IP	H	ER	R	HR	BB	SO	WP	HBP	Fld%
18	131	105	.555	3.43	488	245	79	17	28	2034.1	1807	776	890	201	888	1522	65	41	.969

- American League All-Star (1963, 64)
- American League Leader in strikeouts per 9 innings pitched (1961, 62)
- AmerIcan League Leader in fielding average as pitcher (1963, 64)
- National League pennant team (1957, 58)
- World Series champion team (1957)

Pizarro had a .202 lifetime batting average (133–658) with 8 home runs, 72 runs scored and 66 RBIs.
