= 1961 New York Yankees season =

Season for the Major League Baseball team the New York Yankees

1961 New York Yankees
- World Series champions American League champions
- League: American League
- Ballpark: Yankee Stadium
- City: New York City
- Record: 109–53–1 (.673)
- League place: 1st
- Owners: Dan Topping and Del Webb
- General managers: Roy Hamey
- Managers: Ralph Houk
- Television: WPIX–TV 11 (Mel Allen, Red Barber, Phil Rizzuto)
- Radio: WCBS–AM 880 (Mel Allen, Red Barber, Phil Rizzuto)

The 1961 New York Yankees season was the 59th season for the team. The team finished with a record of 109–53, eight games ahead of the Detroit Tigers, and won their 26th American League pennant. New York was managed by Ralph Houk. The Yankees played their home games at Yankee Stadium. In the World Series, they defeated the Cincinnati Reds in 5 games. This season was best known for the home run chase between Roger Maris and Mickey Mantle, with the former beating Babe Ruth's single season record by hitting 61. The Yankees won an MLB record 65 home games during the season, a record that they still hold to this day.

== Offseason ==
- December 14, 1960: Bob Cerv was drafted from the Yankees by the Los Angeles Angels in the 1960 MLB expansion draft.
- January 16, 1961: Mickey Mantle became the highest paid baseball player by signing a $75,000 contract.
- Prior to 1961 season: Art López was signed as an amateur free agent by the Yankees.
- Prior to 1961 season: Ole Miss Rebels football quarterback Jake Gibbs was signed as an amateur free agent by the Yankees.

== Regular season ==
The 1961 season was notable for the race between center fielder Mickey Mantle and right fielder Roger Maris to break Babe Ruth's record of 60 home runs in a season (set in 1927). Maris eventually broke the record, hitting his 61st home run on October 1, the season's final day. During the season, Maris had seven multi-home run games; in a doubleheader against the Chicago White Sox, he hit four home runs.

1961 was an expansion year, with the American League increasing from eight to ten teams, the first expansion in the 61-year history of the league. The old schedule of 154 games (seven opponents multiplied by 22 games apiece) was replaced by 162 games (nine opponents multiplied by 18 games apiece) which led to some controversy due to the eight extra games that Maris had to try to hit 61.

Ultimately, when Maris broke Ruth's record in game 162, baseball commissioner Ford Frick instigated "The Asterisk", which designated that Maris had only accomplished the feat in a longer season, and disallowed any reference to him as the record-holder. When commissioner Fay Vincent removed "The Asterisk" in 1991, Maris was finally given credit as the single-season home run record-holder. However, Maris had died in 1985, never knowing that the record belonged to him.

In addition to the individual exploits of Maris and Mantle, the 1961 Yankees hit a major league record 240 home runs. The record stood until 1996 when the Baltimore Orioles, with the added benefit of the designated hitter, hit 257 home runs as a team.

The Yankees set an MLB record by winning 65 home games during the season, a record that still stands as of 2026.

=== Roger Maris ===

In 1961, the American League expanded from eight to ten teams, generally watering down the pitching, but leaving the Yankees pretty much intact. Yankee home runs began to come at a record pace. One famous photograph lined up six 1961 Yankee players, including Mantle, Maris, Yogi Berra, Elston Howard, Johnny Blanchard, and Bill Skowron, under the nickname "Murderers Row", because they hit a combined 207 home runs that year. The title "Murderers Row", coined in 1918, had most famously been used to refer to the Yankees side of the late 1920s.

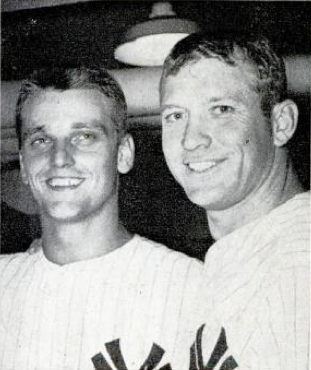
The "M&M Boys" together in 1961.

As mid-season approached, it seemed quite possible that either Maris or Mantle, or perhaps both, would break Babe Ruth's 34-year-old home run record. Unlike the home run race of 1998, in which the competition between Mark McGwire and Sammy Sosa was given extensive positive media coverage, sportswriters in 1961 began to play the "M&M Boys" against each other, inventing a rivalry where none existed, according to Yogi Berra.

The 1961 home run race between Maris and Mantle was dramatized in the 2001 film 61*, filmed under the direction of Billy Crystal.

==== Roger Maris 61 home runs ====
Number	Game*	Date	Pitcher	Team	Inning
1	11	04-26-1961	Paul Foytack	Detroit Tigers	5th
2	17	05-03-1961	Pedro Ramos	Minnesota Twins	7th
3	20	05-06-1961	Eli Grba	Los Angeles Angels	5th
4	29	05-17-1961	Pete Burnside	Washington Senators	8th
5	30	05-19-1961	Jim Perry	Cleveland Indians	1st
6	31	05-20-1961	Gary Bell	Cleveland Indians	3rd
7	32	05-21-1961	Chuck Estrada	Baltimore Orioles	1st
8	35	05-24-1961	Gene Conley	Boston Red Sox	4th
9	38	05-28-1961	Cal McLish	Chicago White Sox	2nd
10	40	05-30-1961	Gene Conley	Boston Red Sox	3rd
11	40	05-30-1961	Mike Fornieles	Boston Red Sox	8th
12	41	05-31-1961	Billy Muffett	Boston Red Sox	3rd
13	43	06-02-1961	Cal McLish	Chicago White Sox	3rd
14	44	06-03-1961	Bob Shaw	Chicago White Sox	8th
15	45	06-04-1961	Russ Kemmerer	Chicago White Sox	3rd
16	48	06-06-1961	Ed Palmquist	Minnesota Twins	6th
17	49	06-07-1961	Pedro Ramos	Minnesota Twins	3rd
18	52	06-09-1961	Ray Herbert	Kansas City Athletics	7th
19	55	06-11-1961	Eli Grba	Los Angeles Angels	3rd
20	55	06-11-1961	Johnny James	Los Angeles Angels	7th
21	57	06-13-1961	Jim Perry	Cleveland Indians	6th
22	58	06-14-1961	Gary Bell	Cleveland Indians	4th
23	61	06-17-1961	Don Mossi	Detroit Tigers	4th
24	62	06-18-1961	Jerry Casale	Detroit Tigers	8th
25	63	06-19-1961	Jim Archer	Kansas City Athletics	9th
26	64	06-20-1961	Joe Nuxhall	Kansas City Athletics	1st
27	66	06-22-1961	Norm Bass	Kansas City Athletics	2nd
28	74	07-01-1961	Dave Sisler	Washington Senators	9th
29	75	07-02-1961	Pete Burnside	Washington Senators	3rd
30	75	07-02-1961	Johnny Klippstein	Washington Senators	7th
31	77	07-04-1961	Frank Lary	Detroit Tigers	8th
32	78	07-05-1961	Frank Funk	Cleveland Indians	7th
33	82	07-09-1961	Bill Monbouquette	Boston Red Sox	7th
34	84	07-13-1961	Early Wynn	Chicago White Sox	1st
35	86	07-15-1961	Ray Herbert	Chicago White Sox	3rd
36	92	07-21-1961	Bill Monbouquette	Boston Red Sox	1st
37	95	07-25-1961	Frank Baumann	Chicago White Sox	4th
38	95	07-25-1961	Don Larsen	Chicago White Sox	8th
39	96	07-25-1961	Russ Kemmerer	Chicago White Sox	4th
40	96	07-25-1961	Warren Hacker	Chicago White Sox	7th
41	106	08-04-1961	Camilo Pascual	Minnesota Twins	1st
42	114	08-11-1961	Pete Burnside	Washington Senators	5th
43	115	08-12-1961	Dick Donovan	Washington Senators	4th
44	116	08-13-1961	Bennie Daniels	Washington Senators	4th
45	117	08-13-1961	Marty Kutyna	Washington Senators	1st
46	118	08-15-1961	Juan Pizarro	Chicago White Sox	4th
47	119	08-16-1961	Billy Pierce	Chicago White Sox	1st
48	119	08-16-1961	Billy Pierce	Chicago White Sox	3rd
49	124	08-20-1961	Jim Perry	Cleveland Indians	3rd
50	125	08-22-1961	Ken McBride	Los Angeles Angels	6th
51	129	08-26-1961	Jerry Walker	Kansas City Athletics	6th
52	135	09-02-1961	Frank Lary	Detroit Tigers	6th
53	135	09-02-1961	Hank Aguirre	Detroit Tigers	8th
54	140	09-06-1961	Tom Cheney	Washington Senators	4th
55	141	09-07-1961	Dick Stigman	Cleveland Indians	3rd
56	143	09-09-1961	Mudcat Grant	Cleveland Indians	7th
57	151	09-16-1961	Frank Lary	Detroit Tigers	3rd
58	152	09-17-1961	Terry Fox	Detroit Tigers	12th
59	155	09-20-1961	Milt Pappas	Baltimore Orioles	3rd
60	159	09-26-1961	Jack Fisher	Baltimore Orioles	3rd
61	163	10-01-1961	Tracy Stallard	Boston Red Sox	4th

*The Yankees played one tie game which was later made up, and hence took 163 games to achieve 162 decisions.

=== Season standings ===
American League
Team	W	L	Pct.	GB	Home	Road
New York Yankees	109	53	.673	—	65‍–‍16	44‍–‍37
Detroit Tigers	101	61	.623	8	50‍–‍31	51‍–‍30
Baltimore Orioles	95	67	.586	14	48‍–‍33	47‍–‍34
Chicago White Sox	86	76	.531	23	53‍–‍28	33‍–‍48
Cleveland Indians	78	83	.484	30½	40‍–‍41	38‍–‍42
Boston Red Sox	76	86	.469	33	50‍–‍31	26‍–‍55
Minnesota Twins	70	90	.438	38	36‍–‍44	34‍–‍46
Los Angeles Angels	70	91	.435	38½	46‍–‍36	24‍–‍55
Kansas City Athletics	61	100	.379	47½	33‍–‍47	28‍–‍53
Washington Senators	61	100	.379	47½	33‍–‍46	28‍–‍54

=== Record vs. opponents ===
1961 American League record Sources:
Team	BAL	BOS	CWS	CLE	DET	KCA	LAA	MIN	NYY	WAS
Baltimore	—	11–7	11–7	9–9	9–9	13–5	8–10	11–7	9–9–1	14–4
Boston	7–11	—	9–9	5–13	8–10	10–8	11–7–1	11–7	5–13	10–8
Chicago	7–11	9–9	—	12–6	6–12	14–4	10–8	9–9–1	6–12	13–5
Cleveland	9–9	13–5	6–12	—	6–12	8–9	10–8	10–8	4–14	12–6
Detroit	9–9	10–8	12–6	12–6	—	12–6–1	14–4	11–7	8–10	13–5
Kansas City	5–13	8–10	4–14	9–8	6–12–1	—	9–9	7–11	4–14	9–9
Los Angeles	10–8	7–11–1	8–10	8–10	4–14	9–9	—	8–9	6–12	10–8
Minnesota	7–11	7–11	9–9–1	8–10	7–11	11–7	9–8	—	4–14	8–9
New York	9–9–1	13–5	12–6	14–4	10–8	14–4	12–6	14–4	—	11–7
Washington	4–14	8–10	5–13	6–12	5–13	9–9	8–10	9–8	7–11	—

=== Notable transactions ===
- May 8, 1961: Lee Thomas, Ryne Duren, and Johnny James was traded by the Yankees to the Los Angeles Angels for Bob Cerv and Tex Clevenger.
- July 1, 1961: Roy White was signed as an amateur free agent by the Yankees.

=== Roster ===
1961 New York Yankees
Roster
Pitchers: 47 Luis Arroyo; 26 Tex Clevenger; 39 Jim Coates; 28 Bud Daley; 28 Art Ditmar; 24 Al Downing; 26 Ryne Duren; 16 Whitey Ford; 53 Johnny James; 29 Duke Maas; 24 Danny McDevitt; 18 Hal Reniff; 45 Rollie Sheldon; 22 Bill Stafford; 23 Ralph Terry; 19 Bob Turley	Catchers: 38 Johnny Blanchard; 32 Elston Howard; Infielders: 34,6 Clete Boyer; 20 Joe DeMaestri; 12 Billy Gardner; 34 Bob Hale; 6 Deron Johnson; 10 Tony Kubek; 1 Bobby Richardson; 14 Bill Skowron; 29 Earl Torgeson; 15 Tom Tresh	Outfielders: 8 Yogi Berra; 17 Bob Cerv; 11 Héctor López; 7 Mickey Mantle; 9 Roger Maris; 15 Jack Reed; Other batters: 25 Jesse Gonder; 17 Lee Thomas	Manager: 35 Ralph Houk; Coaches: 2 Frankie Crosetti (Third base); 44 Jim Hegan (Bullpen); 36 Wally Moses (First base & hitting); 31 Johnny Sain (Pitching); 29 Earl Torgeson

== Game log ==
=== Regular season ===
Legend
	Yankees win
	Yankees loss
	Yankees tie
	Postponement
	Clinched pennant
**Bold**	Yankees team member

1961 Game Log: 109–53–1 (Home: 65–16; Away: 44–37–1)
April: 9–5 (Home: 6–1; Away: 3–4)

#	Date	Time (ET)	Opponent	Score	Win	Loss	Save	Time of Game	Attendance	Record	Box/ Streak
1	April 11		Twins	6–0	Ramos (1–0)	**Ford** (0–1)			14,607	0–1	
2	April 15		Athletics	5–3	**Turley** (1–0)	Daley (0–1)	**Stafford** (1)		11,802	1–1	
3	April 17		Athletics	3–0	**Ford** (1–1)	Walker (0–1)			1,947	2–1	
4	April 20		Angels	7–5	**Ditmar** (1–0)	Grba (0–1)	**Stafford** (2)			3–1	
5	April 20		Angels	4–2	**Turley** (2–0)	Garver (0–1)	**Arroyo** (1)		7,059	4–1	
6	April 21	8:00 p.m. EST	@ Orioles	**W** 4–2	**Ford** (2–1)	Barber (1–1)	—	2:17	12,368	5–1	W5
7 (1)	April 22	2:00 p.m. EST	@ Orioles	L 3–5	Wilhelm (1–0)	**Duren** (0–1)	—	2:17	12,536	5–2	L1
8 (2)	April 22	8:00 p.m. EST	@ Orioles	T 5–5 (7)	—	—	—	2:09	14,126	5–2	T1
9	April 23	2:00 p.m. EST	@ Orioles	L 1–4	Estrada (1–1)	**McDevitt** (0–1)	Hall (1)	2:40	18,704	5–3	L1
10	April 24	1:30 p.m. EST	@ Tigers	L 3–4	Lary (3–0)	**Turley** (2–1)	—	2:19	5,662	5–4	L2
—	April 25	1:30 p.m. EST	@ Tigers	**Postponed (Rain)** (Makeup date: September 15)							
11	April 26	8:15 p.m. EST	@ Tigers	**W** 13–11 (10)	**Arroyo** (1–0)	Aguirre (0–1)	—	3:20	4,676	6–4	W1
12	April 27		Indians	4–3	**Ditmar** (2–0)	Antonelli (0–2)			8,897	7–4	
13	April 29		Indians	4–2	**Terry** (1–0)	Perry (2–1)	**Arroyo** (2)		14,624	8–4	
14	April 30		@ Senators	4–3	**Ford** (3–1)	Donovan (0–4)	**Arroyo** (3)			9–4	
15	April 30		@ Senators	2–1	Woodeshick (1–1)	**Sheldon** (0–1)	Burnside (1)		21,904	9–5	

May: 14–12 (Home: 7–6; Away: 7–6)

#	Date	Time (ET)	Opponent	Score	Win	Loss	Save	Time of Game	Attendance	Record	Box/ Streak
16	May 2		@ Twins	6 – 4 (10)	**Coates** (1–0)	Pascual (2–1)	**Arroyo** (4)		16,669	10–5	
17	May 3		@ Twins	7–3	**Turley** (3–1)	Ramos (2–1)			18,158	11–5	
18	May 4		@ Twins	5–2	**Ford** (4–1)	Kaat (1–2)	**Coates** (1)		18,179	12–5	
19	May 5		@ Angels	5–4	**McDevitt** (1–1)	Clevenger (2–1)	**Arroyo** (5)		17,801	13–5	
20	May 6		@ Angels	5–3	Grba (2–2)	**Ditmar** (2–1)			19,865	13–6	
21	May 7		@ Angels	5–3	Kline (1–0)	**Coates** (1–1)	Clevenger (1)		19,722	13–7	
22	May 9		@ Athletics	5–4	Herbert (2–1)	**Arroyo** (1–1)	Archer (1)		13,623	13–8	
23	May 10		@ Athletics	9–4	**Clevenger** (3–1)	Daley (3–4)			15,986	14–8	
24	May 12	8:00 p.m. EST	Tigers	L 3–4	Lary (5–1)	**Coates** (1–2)	—	3:09	23,556	14–9	L1
25	May 13	2:00 p.m. EST	Tigers	L 3–8	Regan (3–0)	**Turley** (3–2)	—	2:45	18,036	14–10	L2
26 (1)	May 14	2:00 p.m. EST	Tigers	**W** 5–4 (11)	**Coates** (2–2)	Aguirre (1–2)	—	3:30	—	15–10	W1
27 (2)	May 14	5:55 p.m. EST	Tigers	**W** 8–6	**Coates** (3–2)	Bunning (2–3)	—	2:39	40,968	16–10	W2
28	May 16		Senators	3–2	Woodeshick (2–1)	**Stafford** (0–1)	Sisler (5)		10,050	16–11	
29	May 17		Senators	8–7	Burnside (1–2)	**Ditmar** (2–2)	Gabler (1)		6,197	16–12	
30	May 19		@ Indians	9–7	Latman (3–0)	**Clevenger** (3–2)	Allen (2)		21,240	16–13	
31	May 20		@ Indians	4–3	Funk (4–2)	**Stafford** (0–2)			8,431	16–14	
32 (1)	May 21	2:00 p.m. EST	Orioles	**W** 4–2	**Ford** (5–1)	Estrada (2–3)	—	2:22	—	17–14	W1
33 (2)	May 21	4:47 p.m. EST	Orioles	L 2–3	Barber (5–3)	**Sheldon** (0–2)	Wilhelm (5)	2:37	47,890	17–15	L1
34	May 22	8:00 p.m. EST	Orioles	**W** 8–2	**Coates** (4–2)	Fisher (1–5)	**Arroyo** (6)	2:43	16,923	18–15	W1
35	May 24		Red Sox	3–2	**Terry** (2–0)	Nichols (0–1)			7,673	19–15	
36	May 25		Red Sox	6–4	**Ford** (6–1)	Muffett (0–4)	**Arroyo** (7)		13,087	20–15	
37	May 28		White Sox	14–9	Lown (2–2)	**Arroyo** (1–2)	Pierce (2)			20–16	
38	May 28		White Sox	5–3	**Coates** (5–2)	McLish (2–5)			44,435	21–16	
39	May 29		@ Red Sox	2–1	Delock (3–1)	**Ford** (6–2)			21,804	21–17	
40	May 30		@ Red Sox	12–3	**Stafford** (1–2)	Conley (2–4)	**Coates** (2)		19,582	22–17	
41	May 31		@ Red Sox	7–6	**Sheldon** (1–2)	Muffett (0–5)	**McDevitt** (1)		17,318	23–17	

June: 22–10 (Home: 10–1; Away: 12–9)

#	Date	Time (ET)	Opponent	Score	Win	Loss	Save	Time of Game	Attendance	Record	Box/ Streak
42	June 1		@ Red Sox	7–5	Monbouquette (4–5)	**Turley** (3–3)	Stallard (1)		5,257	23–18	
43	June 2		@ White Sox	6–2	**Ford** (7–2)	McLish (2–6)			38,410	24–18	
44	June 3		@ White Sox	6 – 5 (13)	Hacker (1–0)	**Ditmar** (2–3)			16,480	24–19	
45	June 4		@ White Sox	10–1	**Stafford** (2–2)	Pierce (1–5)			28,362	25–19	
46	June 5		Twins	6–2	**Coates** (6–2)	Lee (0–2)	**Arroyo** (8)			26–19	
47	June 5		Twins	6–1	**Sheldon** (2–2)	Stobbs (0–2)			23,103	27–19	
48	June 6		Twins	7–2	**Ford** (8–2)	Kralick (4–4)	**Arroyo** (9)		17,129	28–19	
49	June 7		Twins	5–1	**Terry** (3–0)	Ramos (3–7)			9,016	29–19	
50	June 8		Athletics	6–1	**Stafford** (3–2)	Bass (4–3)				30–19	
51	June 8		Athletics	9–6	Archer (3–1)	**McDevitt** (1–2)			13,157	30–20	
52	June 9		Athletics	8–6	**Arroyo** (2–2)	Herbert (3–6)			22,418	31–20	
53	June 10		Athletics	5–3	**Ford** (9–2)	Nuxhall (4–2)			17,272	32–20	
54	June 11		Angels	2–1	**Terry** (4–0)	McBride (5–4)				33–20	
55	June 11		Angels	5–1	**Sheldon** (3–2)	Grba (5–5)	**Arroyo** (10)		37,378	34–20	
56	June 12		Angels	3–1	**Stafford** (4–2)	Bowsfield (2–2)			16,363	35–20	
57	June 13		@ Indians	7–2	Perry (5–4)	**Coates** (6–3)	Funk (5)		21,704	35–21	
58	June 14		@ Indians	11–5	**Ford** (10–2)	Bell (4–6)	**Arroyo** (11)		25,095	36–21	
59	June 15		@ Indians	3 – 2 (11)	**Terry** (5–0)	Funk (7–5)			23,350	37–21	
60	June 16	8:15 p.m. EST	@ Tigers	L 2–4	Regan (7–2)	**Stafford** (4–3)	—	2:12	51,744	37–22	L1
61	June 17	8:15 p.m. EST	@ Tigers	L 10–12	Foytack (4–4)	**Daley** (4–9)	Fox (4)	2:58	51,509	37–23	L2
62	June 18	1:300 p.m. EST	@ Tigers	**W** 9–0	**Ford** (11–2)	Lary (10–4)	**Arroyo** (12)	2:27	44,459	38–23	W1
63	June 19		@ Athletics	4–3	Archer (5–1)	**Arroyo** (2–3)			16,715	38–24	
64	June 20		@ Athletics	6–2	**Stafford** (5–3)	Nuxhall (4–3)	**Coates** (3)		19,928	39–24	
65	June 21		@ Athletics	5–3	**Daley** (5–9)	Shaw (3–6)	**Arroyo** (13)		19,416	40–24	
66	June 22		@ Athletics	8–3	**Ford** (12–2)	Bass (4–6)	**Arroyo** (14)		17,254	41–24	
67	June 23		@ Twins	4–0	Pascual (5–9)	**Turley** (3–4)			30,940	41–25	
68	June 24		@ Twins	10–7	**Sheldon** (4–2)	Cueto (0–2)	**Arroyo** (15)		35,199	42–25	
69	June 25		@ Twins	8–4	**Stafford** (6–3)	Kralick (6–5)	**Coates** (4)		35,152	43–25	
70	June 26		@ Angels	8–6	**Ford** (13–2)	Donohue (1–2)	**Arroyo** (16)		18,870	44–25	
71	June 27		@ Angels	7–6	Bowsfield (4–2)	**Daley** (5–10)	Grba (2)		16,108	44–26	
72	June 28		@ Angels	5–3	Duren (3–8)	**Turley** (3–5)	Donohue (3)		14,674	44–27	
73	June 30		@ Senators	5–1	**Ford** (14–2)	Donovan (3–8)			28,019	45–27	

July: 20–9 (Home: 11–5; Away: 9–4)

#	Date	Time (ET)	Opponent	Score	Win	Loss	Save	Time of Game	Attendance	Record	Box/ Streak
74	July 1		@ Senators	7–6	**Arroyo** (3–3)	Sisler (1–3)			16,015	46–27	
75	July 2		@ Senators	13–4	**Daley** (6–10)	Burnside (1–5)	**Arroyo** (17)		19,794	47–27	
76 (1)	July 4	1:30 p.m. EST	Tigers	**W** 6–2	**Ford** (15–2)	Mossi (9–2)	—	2:20	—	48–27	W4
77 (2)	July 4	4:15 p.m. EST	Tigers	L 3–4 (10)	Lary (12–4)	**Stafford** (6–4)	Fox (6)	3:29	74,246	48–28	L1
78	July 5		Indians	6–0	**Sheldon** (5–2)	Bell (5–9)			24,377	49–28	
79	July 6		Indians	4–0	**Stafford** (7–4)	Stigman (2–2)			37,136	50–28	
80	July 7		Red Sox	14–3	**Daley** (7–10)	Conley (3–7)			29,199	51–28	
81	July 8		Red Sox	8–5	**Ford** (16–2)	Delock (5–5)	**Arroyo** (18)		23,381	52–28	
82	July 9		Red Sox	3–0	**Sheldon** (6–2)	Monbouquette (8–7)				53–28	
83	July 9		Red Sox	9–6	Schwall (7–2)	**Terry** (5–1)	Earley (1)		47,875	53–29	
—	July 11		**30th All-Star Game in San Francisco, CA**								
84	July 13		@ White Sox	6–2	**Stafford** (8–4)	Wynn (7–2)	**Arroyo** (19)		43,960	54–29	
85	July 14		@ White Sox	6–1	Pizarro (5–3)	**Sheldon** (6–3)			43,450	54–30	
86	July 15		@ White Sox	9 – 8 (10)	**Arroyo** (4–3)	Hacker (2–2)			37,730	55–30	
87	July 16	2:00 p.m. EST	@ Orioles	**W** 2–1	**Daley** (8–10)	Barber (10–7)	—	2:10	38,487	56–30	W2
88	July 17	8:00 p.m. EST	@ Orioles	**W** 5–0	**Ford** (17–2)	Pappas (6–5)	—	2:18	44,332	57–30	W3
89	July 18		@ Senators	5–3	**Arroyo** (5–3)	McClain (7–9)			17,695	58–30	
90	July 19		@ Senators	8–4	Daniels (5–5)	**Daley** (8–11)				58–31	
91	July 19		@ Senators	12–2	Donovan (6–8)	**Downing** (0–1)			27,176	58–32	
92	July 21		@ Red Sox	11–8	**Arroyo** (6–3)	Earley (1–4)			32,186	59–32	
93	July 22		@ Red Sox	11–9	**Arroyo** (7–3)	Conley (4–9)			25,089	60–32	
94	July 23		@ Red Sox	5–4	Schwall (10–2)	**Daley** (8–12)			28,575	60–33	
95	July 25		White Sox	5–1	**Ford** (18–2)	Baumann (7–8)	**Arroyo** (20)			61–33	
96	July 25		White Sox	12–0	**Stafford** (9–4)	Pizarro (6–4)			46,240	62–33	
97	July 26		White Sox	5–2	**Sheldon** (7–3)	Herbert (7–9)			22,366	63–33	
98	July 27		White Sox	4–3	**Terry** (6–1)	Pierce (5–7)	**Arroyo** (21)		20,529	64–33	
99	July 28	8:00 p.m. EST	Orioles	L 0–4	Brown (8–3)	**Daley** (8–13)	—	2:00	39,623	64–34	L1
100	July 29	2:00 p.m. EST	Orioles	**W** 5–4	**Ford** (19–2)	Fisher (4–10)	—	2:08	42,990	65–34	W1
101 (1)	July 30	2:00 p.m. EST	Orioles	L 0–4	Barber (12–8)	**Stafford** (9–5)	—	2:30	—	65–35	L1
102 (2)	July 30	4:55 p.m. EST	Orioles	L 1–2	Pappas (7–6)	**Daley** (8–14)	Hall (3)	2:53	57,180	65–36	L2
—	July 31		**31st All-Star Game in Boston, MA**								

August: 22–9 (Home: 7–9; Away: 7–5)

#	Date	Time (ET)	Opponent	Score	Win	Loss	Save	Time of Game	Attendance	Record	Box/ Streak
103	August 2		Athletics	6–5	**Arroyo** (8–3)	Archer (7–6)				66–36	
104	August 2		Athletics	12–5	**Terry** (7–1)	Ditmar (2–6)	**Reniff** (1)		23,616	67–36	
105	August 3		Athletics	6–1	Shaw (7–9)	**Daley** (8–15)			12,584	67–37	
106	August 4		Twins	8 – 5 (10)	**Arroyo** (9–3)	Pleis (3–2)			24,109	68–37	
107	August 5		Twins	2–1	**Coates** (7–3)	Kralick (10–7)			18,880	69–37	
108	August 6		Twins	7 – 6 (15)	**Reniff** (1–0)	Moore (4–4)				70–37	
109	August 6		Twins	3–2	**Sheldon** (8–3)	Schroll (0–1)			39,408	71–37	
110	August 7		Angels	4–1	**Daley** (9–15)	McBride (9–8)			13,944	72–37	
111	August 8		Angels	5 – 4 (10)	**Arroyo** (10–3)	Fowler (5–5)			24,084	73–37	
112	August 9		Angels	2–0	**Coates** (8–3)	Bowsfield (8–4)			17,261	74–37	
113	August 10		Angels	3–1	**Ford** (20–2)	Donohue (4–5)	**Arroyo** (22)		15,575	75–37	
114	August 11		@ Senators	12–5	**Terry** (8–1)	McClain (7–13)	**Reniff** (2)		22,601	76–37	
115	August 12		@ Senators	5–1	Donovan (8–8)	**Stafford** (9–6)			15,870	76–38	
116	August 13		@ Senators	12–2	Daniels (7–6)	**Daley** (9–16)				76–39	
117	August 13		@ Senators	9–4	**Coates** (9–3)	Kutyna (6–4)			27,368	77–39	
118	August 15		White Sox	2–1	Pizarro (8–5)	**Ford** (20–3)			49,059	77–40	
119	August 16		White Sox	5–4	**Terry** (9–1)	Lown (6–5)			29,728	78–40	
120	August 17		White Sox	5–3	**Stafford** (10–6)	Baumann (9–10)	**Arroyo** (23)		25,532	79–40	
121	August 18		@ Indians	5–1	Grant (12–6)	**Coates** (9–4)			37,840	79–41	
122	August 19		@ Indians	3 – 2 (10)	**Ford** (21–3)	Locke (4–2)	**Arroyo** (24)		23,398	80–41	
123	August 20		@ Indians	6–0	**Terry** (10–1)	Perry (9–11)				81–41	
124	August 20		@ Indians	5–2	**Sheldon** (9–3)	Bell (8–13)			56,307	82–41	
125	August 22		@ Angels	4–3	McBride (10–10)	**Stafford** (10–7)			19,930	82–42	
126	August 23		@ Angels	8 – 6 (10)	**Arroyo** (11–3)	Donohue (4–6)			19,773	83–42	
127	August 24		@ Angels	6–4	Morgan (6–2)	**Coates** (9–5)			19,819	83–43	
128	August 25		@ Athletics	3–0	**Terry** (11–1)	Archer (8–10)			30,830	84–43	
129	August 26		@ Athletics	5–1	**Stafford** (11–7)	Walker (5–11)			32,149	85–43	
130	August 27		@ Athletics	8–7	**Ford** (22–3)	Shaw (8–12)	**Arroyo** (25)		34,065	86–43	
131	August 29		@ Twins	3–0	Pascual (12–13)	**Terry** (11–2)			40,118	86–44	
132	August 30		@ Twins	4–0	**Stafford** (12–7)	Kaat (7–13)			41,357	87–44	
133	August 31		@ Twins	5–4	Kralick (12–9)	**Sheldon** (9–4)			33,709	87–45	

September: 21–8 (Home: 15–1; Away: 6–7)

#	Date	Time (ET)	Opponent	Score	Win	Loss	Save	Time of Game	Attendance	Record	Box/ Streak
134	September 1	8:00 p.m. EST	Tigers	**W** 1–0	**Arroyo** (12–3)	Mossi (14–4)	—	2:44	65,566	88–45	W1
135	September 2	2:00 p.m. EST	Tigers	**W** 7–2	**Terry** (12–2)	Lary (19–8)	**Arroyo** (26)	2:02	50,261	89–45	W2
136	September 3	2:00 p.m. EST	Tigers	**W** 8–5	**Arroyo** (13–3)	Staley (2–5)	—	2:42	55,676	90–45	W3
137	September 4		Senators	5–3	**Reniff** (2–0)	Daniels (8–10)				91–45	
138	September 4		Senators	3–2	**Daley** (10–16)	Burnside (1–7)			34,683	92–45	
139	September 5		Senators	6–1	**Coates** (10–5)	McClain (8–16)			16,917	93–45	
140	September 6		Senators	8–0	**Ford** (23–3)	Cheney (1–3)			12,295	94–45	
141	September 7		Indians	7–3	**Terry** (13–2)	Stigman (2–4)			18,549	95–45	
142	September 8		Indians	9–1	**Stafford** (13–7)	Bell (9–15)			41,762	96–45	
143	September 9		Indians	8–7	**Arroyo** (14–3)	Funk (11–10)			37,161	97–45	
144	September 10		Indians	7–6	**Coates** (11–5)	Locke (4–4)	**Arroyo** (27)			98–45	
145	September 10		Indians	9–3	**Daley** (11–16)	Perry (10–14)			57,824	99–45	
146	September 12		@ White Sox	4 – 3 (6)	**Terry** (14–2)	Pierce (9–9)			36,166	100–45	
147	September 14		@ White Sox	8–3	Herbert (10–12)	**Sheldon** (9–5)	Hacker (7)			100–46	
148	September 14		@ White Sox	4–3	Kemmerer (3–3)	**Arroyo** (14–4)			18,120	100–47	
149 (1)	September 15	6:00 p.m. EST	@ Tigers	**W** 11–1	**Ford** (24–3)	Mossi (14–7)	—	2:47	—	101–47	W1
150 (2)	September 15	9:12 p.m. EST	@ Tigers	L 2–4	Kline (7–8)	**Daley** (11–17)	—	2:32	42,267	101–48	L1
151	September 16	1:30 p.m. EST	@ Tigers	L 4–10	Lary (21–9)	**Terry** (14–3)	—	2:32	35,820	101–49	L2
152	September 17	1:30 p.m. EST	@ Tigers	**W** 6–4 (12)	**Arroyo** (15–4)	Fox (4–2)	—	3:46	44,219	102–49	W1
153 (1)	September 19	6:00 p.m. EST	@ Orioles	L 0–1	Barber (17–11)	**Ford** (24–4)	—	2:27	—	102–50	L1
154 (2)	September 19	8:52 p.m. EST	@ Orioles	**W** 3–1	**Daley** (12–17)	Brown (10–6)	—	2:08	31,317	103–50	W1
155	September 20	8:00 p.m. EST	@ Orioles	**W** 4–2	**Terry** (15–3)	Pappas (12–9)	—	2:00	21,032	104–50	W2
156	September 21	8:00 p.m. EST	@ Orioles	L 3–5	Fisher (10–12)	**Stafford** (13–8)	—	2:04	22,089	104–51	L1
157	September 23		@ Red Sox	8–3	**Ford** (25–4)	Schwall (15–6)	**Arroyo** (28)		28,128	105–51	
158	September 24		@ Red Sox	3–1	Monbouquette (14–13)	**Arroyo** (15–5)			30,802	105–52	
159	September 26	8:00 p.m. EST	Orioles	**W** 3–2	**Sheldon** (10–5)	Fisher (10–13)	—	2:13	19,401	106–52	W1
160	September 27	2:00 p.m. EST	Orioles	L 2–3	Barber (18–12)	**Stafford** (13–9)	Hall (4)	2:07	7,594	106–53	L1
161	September 29		Red Sox	2–1	**Sheldon** (11–5)	Monbouquette (14–14)			21,485	107–53	
162	September 30		Red Sox	3–1	**Terry** (16–3)	Schwall (15–7)	**Coates** (5)		19,061	108–53	

October: 1–0 (Home: 1–0; Away: 0–0)

#	Date	Time (ET)	Opponent	Score	Win	Loss	Save	Time of Game	Attendance	Record	Box/ Streak
163	October 1		Red Sox	1–0	**Stafford** (14–9)	Stallard (2–7)	**Arroyo** (29)		23,154	109–53	

=== Detailed records ===
American League
Opponent	Home	Away	Total	Pct.	Runs scored	Runs allowed
Baltimore Orioles	4–5	5–4	9–9	.500	55	52
Boston Red Sox	8–1	5–4	13–5	.722	106	71
Chicago White Sox	7–2	5–4	12–6	.667	98	72
Cleveland Indians	9–0	5–4	14–4	.778	99	61
Detroit Tigers	6–3	4–5	10–8	.556	104	85
Kansas City Athletics	7–2	7–2	14–4	.778	103	67
Los Angeles Angels	7–2	5–4	12–6	.667	78	64
Minnesota Twins	8–1	6–3	14–4	.778	88	58
**New York Yankees**	—	—	—	—	—	—
Washington Senators	7–2	4–5	11–7	.611	96	82
	**65–16**	**44–37**	**109–53**	**.673**	**827**	**612**

=== Postseason Game log ===
Legend
	Yankees win
	Yankees loss
**Bold**	Yankees team member

1961 Postseason game log: 4–1 (Home: 1–1; Away: 3–0)
World Series vs Cincinnati Reds (Home: 1–1; Away: 3–0)

#	Date	Time (ET)	Opponent	Score	Win	Loss	Save	Time of Game	Attendance	Series	Box/ Streak
1	October 4	1:00 p.m. EDT	Reds	**W** 2–0	**Ford** (1–0)	O'Toole (0–1)	—	2:11	62,397	NYA 1–0	W1
2	October 5	1:00 p.m. EDT	Reds	L 2–6	Jay (1–0)	**Terry** (0–1)	—	2:43	63,083	TIE 1–1	L1
3	October 7	2:00 p.m. EDT	@ Reds	**W** 3–2	**Arroyo** (1–0)	Purkey (0–1)	—	2:15	32,589	NYA 2–1	W1
4	October 8	2:00 p.m. EST	@ Reds	**W** 7–0	**Ford** (2–0)	O'Toole (0–2)	**Coates** (1)	2:27	32,589	NYA 3–1	W2
5	October 9	2:00 p.m. EST	@ Reds	**W** 13–5	**Daley** (1–0)	Jay (1–1)	—	3:05	32,589	NYA 4–1	W3

== Starting Lineups ==
=== Regular Season ===
==== Batting Order ====
1961 Regular Season Batting Order game log
April

#	Date	Opponent	1st	2nd	3rd	4th	5th	6th	7th	8th	9th

May

#	Date	Opponent	1st	2nd	3rd	4th	5th	6th	7th	8th	9th

June

#	Date	Opponent	1st	2nd	3rd	4th	5th	6th	7th	8th	9th

July

#	Date	Opponent	1st	2nd	3rd	4th	5th	6th	7th	8th	9th

August

#	Date	Opponent	1st	2nd	3rd	4th	5th	6th	7th	8th	9th

September

#	Date	Opponent	1st	2nd	3rd	4th	5th	6th	7th	8th	9th

October

#	Date	Opponent	1st	2nd	3rd	4th	5th	6th	7th	8th	9th

==== Defensive Lineup ====
1961 Regular Season Defensive Lineup game log
April

#	Date	Opponent	C	1B	2B	3B	SS	LF	CF	RF	P

May

#	Date	Opponent	C	1B	2B	3B	SS	LF	CF	RF	P

June

#	Date	Opponent	C	1B	2B	3B	SS	LF	CF	RF	P

July

#	Date	Opponent	C	1B	2B	3B	SS	LF	CF	RF	P

August

#	Date	Opponent	C	1B	2B	3B	SS	LF	CF	RF	P

September

#	Date	Opponent	C	1B	2B	3B	SS	LF	CF	RF	P

October

#	Date	Opponent	C	1B	2B	3B	SS	LF	CF	RF	P

=== World Series ===
==== Batting Order ====
1961 Postseason Batting Order game log
World Series: vs. Cincinnati Reds

#	Date	Opponent	1st	2nd	3rd	4th	5th	6th	7th	8th	9th
1	October 4	CIN	#1; Richardson (2B)	#10; Kubek (SS)	#9; Maris (CF)	#32; Howard (C)	#14; Skowron (1B)	#8; Berra (LF)	#11; López (RF)	#6; Boyer (3B)	#16; Ford (SP)
2	October 5	CIN	#1; Richardson (2B)	#10; Kubek (SS)	#9; Maris (CF)	#8; Berra (LF)	#38; Blanchard (RF)	#32; Howard (C)	#14; Skowron (1B)	#6; Boyer (3B)	#23; Terry (SP)
3	October 7	@ CIN	#1; Richardson (2B)	#10; Kubek (SS)	#9; Maris (RF)	#7; Mantle (CF)	#8; Berra (LF)	#32; Howard (C)	#14; Skowron (1B)	#6; Boyer (3B)	#22; Stafford (SP)
4	October 8	@ CIN	#1; Richardson (2B)	#10; Kubek (SS)	#9; Maris (RF)	#7; Mantle (CF)	#32; Howard (C)	#8; Berra (LF)	#14; Skowron (1B)	#6; Boyer (3B)	#16; Ford (SP)
5	October 9	@ CIN	#1; Richardson (2B)	#10; Kubek (SS)	#9; Maris (C)	#38; Blanchard (RF)	#32; Howard (C)	#14; Skowron (1B)	#11; López (LF)	#6; Boyer (3B)	#23; Terry (SP)

==== Defensive Lineup ====
1961 Postseason Defensive Lineup game log
World Series: vs. Cincinnati Reds

#	Date	Opponent	C	1B	2B	3B	SS	LF	CF	RF	P
1	October 4	CIN	#32; Howard	#14; Skowron	#1; Richardson	#6; Boyer	#10; Kubek	#8; Berra	#9; Maris	#11; López	#16; Ford
2	October 5	CIN	#32; Howard	#14; Skowron	#1; Richardson	#6; Boyer	#10; Kubek	#8; Berra	#9; Maris	#38; Blanchard	#23; Terry
3	October 7	@ CIN	#32; Howard	#14; Skowron	#1; Richardson	#6; Boyer	#10; Kubek	#8; Berra	#7; Mantle	#9; Maris	#22; Stafford
4	October 8	@ CIN	#32; Howard	#14; Skowron	#1; Richardson	#6; Boyer	#10; Kubek	#8; Berra	#7; Mantle	#9; Maris	#16; Ford
5	October 9	@ CIN	#32; Howard	#14; Skowron	#1; Richardson	#6; Boyer	#10; Kubek	#11; López	#9; Maris	#38; Blanchard	#23; Terry

== Game Umpires ==
=== Regular Season ===
1961 Regular Season Umpire game log
April

#	Date	Opponent	HP	1B	2B	3B

May

#	Date	Opponent	HP	1B	2B	3B

June

#	Date	Opponent	HP	1B	2B	3B

July

#	Date	Opponent	HP	1B	2B	3B

August

#	Date	Opponent	HP	1B	2B	3B

September

#	Date	Opponent	HP	1B	2B	3B

October

#	Date	Opponent	HP	1B	2B	3B

=== World Series ===
1961 Postseason Umpire game log
World Series: vs. Cincinnati Reds

#	Date	Opponent	HP	1B	2B	3B	LF	RF
1	October 4	CIN	Ed Runge (AL) (crew chief)	Jocko Conlan (NL)	Frank Umont (AL)	Augie Donatelli (NL)	Shag Crawford (NL)	Bob Stewart (AL)
2	October 5	CIN	Jocko Conlan (NL)	Frank Umont (AL)	Augie Donatelli (NL)	Ed Runge (AL) (crew chief)	Shag Crawford (NL)	Bob Stewart (AL)
3	October 7	@ CIN	Frank Umont (AL)	Augie Donatelli (NL)	Ed Runge (AL) (crew chief)	Jocko Conlan (NL)	Shag Crawford (NL)	Bob Stewart (AL)
4	October 8	@ CIN	Augie Donatelli (NL)	Ed Runge (AL) (crew chief)	Jocko Conlan (NL)	Frank Umont (AL)	Shag Crawford (NL)	Bob Stewart (AL)
5	October 9	@ CIN	Ed Runge (AL) (crew chief)	Jocko Conlan (NL)	Frank Umont (AL)	Augie Donatelli (NL)	Shag Crawford (NL)	Bob Stewart (AL)

== Player stats ==
= Indicates team leader

= Indicates league leader

=== Batting ===
==== Starters by position ====
Note: Pos = Position; G = Games played; AB = At bats; H = Hits; R = Runs; Avg. = Batting average; HR = Home runs; RBI = Runs batted in

Pos	Player	G	AB	R	H	Avg.	HR	RBI
C	Elston Howard	129	446	64	155	.348	21	77
1B	Bill Skowron	150	561	77	150	.267	28	89
2B	Bobby Richardson	162	662	80	173	.261	4	49
3B	Clete Boyer	148	504	61	113	.224	11	55
SS	Tony Kubek	153	617	84	170	.276	8	46
LF	Yogi Berra	119	395	62	107	.271	22	61
CF	Mickey Mantle	153	514	131	163	.317	54	128
RF	Roger Maris	161	590	132	159	.269	61	141*

- Tied with Jim Gentile for league lead in RBI.

==== Other batters ====
Note: G = Games played; AB = At bats; H = Hits; Avg. = Batting average; HR = Home runs; RBI = Runs batted in

Player	G	AB	H	Avg.	HR	RBI
Johnny Blanchard	93	243	74	.305	21	54
Héctor López	93	243	54	.222	3	22
Bob Cerv	57	118	32	.271	6	20
Billy Gardner	41	99	21	.212	1	2
Joe DeMaestri	30	41	6	.146	0	2
Deron Johnson	13	19	2	.105	0	2
Earl Torgeson	22	18	2	.111	0	0
Jack Reed	28	13	2	.154	0	1
Bob Hale	11	13	2	.154	1	1
Jesse Gonder	15	12	4	.333	0	3
Tom Tresh	9	8	2	.250	0	0
Lee Thomas	2	2	1	.500	0	0

=== Pitching ===
==== Starting pitchers ====
Note: G = Games pitched; IP = Innings pitched; W = Wins; L = Losses; ERA = Earned run average; SO = Strikeouts

Player	G	IP	W	L	ERA	SO
Whitey Ford	39	283.0	25	4	3.21	209
Bill Stafford	36	195.0	14	9	2.68	101
Ralph Terry	31	188.1	16	3	3.15	86
Bud Daley	23	129.2	8	9	3.96	83
Bob Turley	15	72.0	3	5	5.75	48

==== Other pitchers ====
Note: G = Games pitched; IP = Innings pitched; W = Wins; L = Losses; ERA = Earned run average; SO = Strikeouts

Player	G	IP	W	L	ERA	SO
Rollie Sheldon	35	162.2	11	5	3.60	84
Jim Coates	43	141.1	11	5	3.44	80
Art Ditmar	12	54.1	2	3	4.64	24
Danny McDevitt	8	13.0	1	2	7.62	8
Al Downing	5	9.0	1	0	8.00	12

==== Relief pitchers ====
Note: G = Games pitched; W = Wins; L = Losses; SV = Saves; ERA = Earned run average; SO = Strikeouts

Player	G	IP	W	L	SV	ERA	SO
Luis Arroyo	65	119.0	15	5	29	2.19	87
Hal Reniff	25	45.1	2	0	2	2.58	21
Tex Clevenger	21	31.2	1	1	0	4.83	14
Ryne Duren	4	5.0	0	1	0	5.40	7
Johnny James	1	1.1	0	0	0	0.00	2
Duke Maas	1	0.1	0	0	0	54.00	0

== 1961 World Series ==
1961 World Series; New York Yankees def. Cincinnati Reds, 4–1; MVP Award: Whitey Ford, P, New York
Game	Date	Score	Series (NYY-CIN)	Location	Attendance	Time
1	October 4	Yankees 2, Reds 0	1–0	Yankee Stadium	62,397	2:11
2	October 5	Reds 6, Yankees 2	1–1	Yankee Stadium	63,083	2:43
3	October 7	Yankees 3, Reds 2	2–1	Crosley Field	32,589	2:15
4	October 8	Yankees 7, Reds 0	3–1	Crosley Field	32.589	2:27
5	October 9	Yankees 13, Reds 5	4–1	Crosley Field	32,589	3:05

== Awards and honors ==
- Roger Maris, American League MVP
- Roger Maris, Associated Press Athlete of the Year
- Whitey Ford, Cy Young Award
- Whitey Ford, Babe Ruth Award

1961 All-Star Game

- Whitey Ford, starter, pitcher
- Tony Kubek, starter, shortstop
- Mickey Mantle, starter, center field
- Roger Maris, starter, right field
- Luis Arroyo, reserve
- Yogi Berra, reserve
- Elston Howard, reserve
- Bill Skowron, reserve

=== League leaders ===
- Whitey Ford, led league in innings: (283)
- Whitey Ford, led league in games started: (39)
- Whitey Ford, led league in batters faced: (1,159)
- Luis Arroyo, led league in games pitched: (65) and saves: (29)
- Roger Maris, Major League Baseball home run champion, (61)

=== Franchise records ===
- Roger Maris, Yankees single season record, home runs in a season: (61)
- Mickey Mantle, Yankees single season record, home runs by a center fielder: (54)

=== Team leaders ===
- Home runs – Roger Maris (61)
- RBI – Roger Maris (142)
- Batting average – Mickey Mantle (.317)
- Hits – Bobby Richardson (173)
- Stolen bases – Mickey Mantle (12)
- Walks – Mickey Mantle (126)
- Wins – Whitey Ford (25)
- Earned run average – Bill Stafford (2.68)
- Strikeouts – Whitey Ford (209)

== Farm system ==
Level	Team	League	Manager
AAA	Richmond Virginians	International League	Cal Ermer
AA	Amarillo Gold Sox	Texas League	Sheriff Robinson
A	Binghamton Triplets	Eastern League	Jim Gleeson
B	Greensboro Yankees	Carolina League	Wayne Terwilliger
C	Modesto Reds	California League	Vern Rapp
D	Harlan Smokies	Appalachian League	Frank Parenti and Eddie Lyons
D	St. Petersburg Saints	Florida State League	Bob Bauer
D	Auburn Yankees	New York–Penn League	Loren Babe

Harlan affiliation shared with Chicago White Sox
