= 1963 New York Yankees season =

Season for the Major League Baseball team the New York Yankees

1963 New York Yankees
- American League champions
- League: American League
- Ballpark: Yankee Stadium
- City: New York City
- Record: 104–57 (.646)
- League place: 1st
- Owners: Dan Topping and Del Webb
- General managers: Roy Hamey
- Managers: Ralph Houk
- Television: WPIX (Mel Allen, Red Barber, Phil Rizzuto, Jerry Coleman)
- Radio: WCBS (AM) (Mel Allen, Red Barber, Phil Rizzuto, Jerry Coleman)

The 1963 New York Yankees season was the 61st season for the team. The team finished with a record of 104–57, winning their 28th pennant, finishing 10 1/2 games ahead of the Chicago White Sox. New York was managed by Ralph Houk.

The Yankees played at Yankee Stadium. In the World Series, they were defeated by the Los Angeles Dodgers in 4 games, the first time the Yankees had ever been swept in the World Series (they had lost 4 games to none with one tied game in 1922).

== Offseason ==
- November 26, 1962: Bill Skowron was traded by the Yankees to the Los Angeles Dodgers for Stan Williams.

== Regular season ==
Elston Howard became the first black player in the history of the American League to win the AL Most Valuable Player award.

=== Season standings ===
American League
Team	W	L	Pct.	GB	Home	Road
New York Yankees	104	57	.646	—	58‍–‍22	46‍–‍35
Chicago White Sox	94	68	.580	10½	49‍–‍33	45‍–‍35
Minnesota Twins	91	70	.565	13	48‍–‍33	43‍–‍37
Baltimore Orioles	86	76	.531	18½	48‍–‍33	38‍–‍43
Cleveland Indians	79	83	.488	25½	41‍–‍40	38‍–‍43
Detroit Tigers	79	83	.488	25½	47‍–‍34	32‍–‍49
Boston Red Sox	76	85	.472	28	44‍–‍36	32‍–‍49
Kansas City Athletics	73	89	.451	31½	36‍–‍45	37‍–‍44
Los Angeles Angels	70	91	.435	34	39‍–‍42	31‍–‍49
Washington Senators	56	106	.346	48½	31‍–‍49	25‍–‍57

=== Record vs. opponents ===
1963 American League record Sources:
Team	BAL	BOS	CWS	CLE	DET	KCA	LAA	MIN	NYY	WAS
Baltimore	—	7–11	7–11	10–8	13–5	9–9	9–9	9–9	7–11	15–3
Boston	11–7	—	8–10	10–8	9–9	7–11	9–8	7–11	6–12	9–9
Chicago	11–7	10–8	—	11–7	11–7	12–6	10–8	8–10	8–10	13–5
Cleveland	8–10	8–10	7–11	—	10–8	11–7	10–8	5–13	7–11	13–5
Detroit	5–13	9–9	7–11	8–10	—	13–5	12–6	8–10	8–10	9–9
Kansas City	9–9	11–7	6–12	7–11	5–13	—	10–8	9–9	6–12	10–8
Los Angeles	9–9	8–9	8–10	8–10	6–12	8–10	—	9–9	5–13	9–9
Minnesota	9–9	11–7	10–8	13–5	10–8	9–9	9–9	—	6–11	14–4
New York	11–7	12–6	10–8	11–7	10–8	12–6	13–5	11–6	—	14–4
Washington	3–15	9–9	5–13	5–13	9–9	8–10	9–9	4–14	4–14	—

=== Notable transactions ===
- April 29, 1963: Curt Blefary was selected off waivers from the Yankees by the Baltimore Orioles as a first-year waiver pick.

=== Roster ===
1963 New York Yankees
**Roster**
**Pitchers**: 47 Luis Arroyo; 56 Jim Bouton; 30 Marshall Bridges; 28 Bud Daley; 24 Al Downing; 16 Whitey Ford; 39 Steve Hamilton; 20 Bill Kunkel; 29 Tom Metcalf; 18 Hal Reniff; 22 Bill Stafford; 23 Ralph Terry; 19 Stan Williams	**Catchers**: 8 Yogi Berra; 41 Jake Gibbs; 32 Elston Howard; **Infielders**: 6 Clete Boyer; 14 Harry Bright; 42 Pedro González; 10 Tony Kubek; 34 Phil Linz; 26 Dale Long; 25 Joe Pepitone; 1 Bobby Richardson	**Outfielders**: 38 Johnny Blanchard; 11 Héctor López; 7 Mickey Mantle; 9 Roger Maris; 27 Jack Reed; 15 Tom Tresh	**Manager**: 35 Ralph Houk; **Coaches**: 8 Yogi Berra; 2 Frankie Crosetti; 44 Jim Hegan; 26 Dale Long; 31 Johnny Sain

=== Game log ===
Legend
	Yankees win
	Yankees loss
	Postponement
	Clinched pennant
**Bold**	Yankees team member

1963 Game Log: 104–57 (Home: 58–22; Away: 46–35)
April: 8–6 (Home: 4–4; Away: 4–2)

#	Date	Time (ET)	Opponent	Score	Win	Loss	Save	Time of Game	Attendance	Record	Streak

May: 17–9 (Home: 9–2; Away: 8–7)

#	Date	Time (ET)	Opponent	Score	Win	Loss	Save	Time of Game	Attendance	Record	Streak

June: 19–13 (Home: 11–2; Away: 8–11)

#	Date	Time (ET)	Opponent	Score	Win	Loss	Save	Time of Game	Attendance	Record	Streak

July: 22–9 (Home: 15–4; Away: 7–5)

#	Date	Time (ET)	Opponent	Score	Win	Loss	Save	Time of Game	Attendance	Record	Streak
—	July 9	1:00 p.m. EDT	34th All-Star Game	National League vs. American League (Cleveland Municipal Stadium, Cleveland, Ohio)							

August: 22–10 (Home: 10–6; Away: 12–4)

#	Date	Time (ET)	Opponent	Score	Win	Loss	Save	Time of Game	Attendance	Record	Streak

September: 16–10 (Home: 9–4; Away: 7–6)

#	Date	Time (ET)	Opponent	Score	Win	Loss	Save	Time of Game	Attendance	Record	Streak

=== Postseason Game log ===
1963 Postseason game log: 0–4 (Home: 0–2; Away: 0–2)
World Series vs. Los Angeles Dodgers 0–4 (Home: 0–2; Away: 0–2)

#	Date	Time (ET)	Opponent	Score	Win	Loss	Save	Time of Game	Attendance	Series	Box/ Streak
1	October 2	1:00 p.m. EDT	Dodgers	L 2–5	Koufax (1–0)	**Ford** (0–1)	—	2:09	69,000	LAN 1–0	L1
2	October 3	1:00 p.m. EDT	Dodgers	L 1–4	Podres (1–0)	**Downing** (0–1)	Perranoski (1)	2:13	66,455	LAN 2–0	L2
3	October 5	4:00 p.m. EDT	@ Dodgers	L 0–1	Drysdale (1–0)	**Bouton** (0–1)	—	2:05	55,912	LAN 3–0	L3
4	October 6	4:00 p.m. EDT	@ Dodgers	L 1–2	Koufax (2–0)	**Ford** (0–2)	—	1:50	55,912	LAN 4–0	L4

== Player stats ==
= Indicates team leader

= Indicates league leader

=== Batting ===
==== Starters by position ====
Note: Pos = Position; G = Games played; AB = At bats; H = Hits; Avg. = Batting average; HR = Home runs; RBI = Runs batted in

Pos	Player	G	AB	H	Avg.	HR	RBI
C	Elston Howard	135	487	140	.287	28	85
1B	Joe Pepitone	157	580	157	.271	27	89
2B	Bobby Richardson	151	630	167	.265	3	48
3B	Clete Boyer	152	557	140	.251	12	54
SS	Tony Kubek	135	557	143	.257	7	44
LF	Héctor López	130	433	108	.249	14	52
CF	Tom Tresh	145	520	140	.269	25	71
RF	Roger Maris	90	312	84	.269	23	53

==== Other batters ====
Note: G = Games played; AB = At bats; H = Hits; Avg. = Batting average; HR = Home runs; RBI = Runs batted in

Player	G	AB	H	Avg.	HR	RBI
Johnny Blanchard	76	218	49	.225	16	45
Phil Linz	72	186	50	.269	2	12
Mickey Mantle	65	172	54	.314	15	35
Harry Bright	60	157	37	.236	7	23
Yogi Berra	64	147	43	.293	8	28
Jack Reed	106	73	15	.205	0	1
Pedro González	14	26	5	.192	0	1
Dale Long	14	15	3	.200	0	0
Jake Gibbs	4	8	2	.250	0	0

=== Pitching ===
==== Starting pitchers ====
Note: G = Games pitched; IP = Innings pitched; W = Wins; L = Losses; ERA = Earned run average; SO = Strikeouts

Player	G	IP	W	L	ERA	SO
Whitey Ford	38	269.1	24	7	2.74	189
Ralph Terry	40	268.0	17	15	3.22	114
Jim Bouton	40	249.1	21	7	2.53	148
Al Downing	24	175.2	13	5	2.56	171
Stan Williams	29	146.0	9	8	3.21	98

==== Other pitchers ====
Note: G = Games pitched; IP = Innings pitched; W = Wins; L = Losses; ERA = Earned run average; SO = Strikeouts

Player	G	IP	W	L	ERA	SO
Tom Metcalf	8	13.0	1	0	2.77	3
Luis Arroyo	6	6.0	1	1	13.50	5
Bud Daley	1	1.0	0	0	0.00	0

==== Relief pitchers ====
Note: G = Games pitched; W = Wins; L = Losses; SV = Saves; ERA = Earned run average; SO = Strikeouts

Player	G	W	L	SV	ERA	SO
Hal Reniff	48	4	3	18	2.62	56
Steve Hamilton	34	5	1	5	2.60	63
Bill Stafford	28	4	8	3	6.02	52
Marshall Bridges	23	2	0	1	3.82	35
Bill Kunkel	22	3	2	0	2.72	31

== 1963 World Series ==
NL Los Angeles Dodgers (4) vs. AL New York Yankees (0)

Game	Score	Date	Location	Attendance
1	Dodgers – 5, Yankees – 2	October 2	Yankee Stadium	69,000
2	Dodgers – 4, Yankees – 1	October 3	Yankee Stadium	66,455
3	Yankees – 0, Dodgers – 1	October 5	Dodger Stadium	55,912
4	Yankees – 1, Dodgers – 2	October 6	Dodger Stadium	55,912

== Awards and honors ==
- Elston Howard, American League MVP
- Ralph Houk, Associated Press AL Manager of the Year

=== All-Stars ===
All-Star Game

- Joe Pepitone, starter, first base
- Jim Bouton, reserve
- Elston Howard, reserve
- Bobby Richardson, reserve
- Tom Tresh, reserve
- Mickey Mantle, did not play (injured)

== Farm system ==
Level	Team	League	Manager
AAA	Richmond Virginians	International League	Preston Gómez
AA	Augusta Yankees	Sally League	Rube Walker
A	Greensboro Yankees	Carolina League	Frank Verdi
A	Fort Lauderdale Yankees	Florida State League	Pinky May, Steve Souchock and Cloyd Boyer
A	Idaho Falls Yankees	Pioneer League	Loren Babe
A	Shelby Colonels	Western Carolinas League	Billy Shantz
Rookie	Harlan Yankees	Appalachian League	Gary Blaylock

LEAGUE CHAMPIONS: Augusta, Idaho Falls
