= Rollie Sheldon =

American baseball player (1936–2026)

- Pitcher
- Born: December 17, 1936; Putnam, Connecticut, U.S.
- Died: August 31, 2026 (aged 89); Lee's Summit, Missouri, U.S.
- Batted: Right Threw: Right

MLB debut
- April 23, 1961, for the New York Yankees

Last MLB appearance
- September 25, 1966, for the Boston Red Sox

MLB statistics
- Win–loss record: 38–36
- Earned run average: 4.05
- Strikeouts: 371
- Stats at Baseball Reference

Teams
- New York Yankees (1961–1962, 1964–1965); Kansas City Athletics (1965–1966); Boston Red Sox (1966)

Roland Frank Sheldon (December 17, 1936 – August 31, 2026) was an American professional baseball player. A right-handed pitcher, he appeared in 160 Major League games from 1961 to 1966.

== Early career ==
Sheldon played baseball at Woodstock Academy high school in Woodstock, CT, and then enrolled in the U.S. Air Force, playing baseball and basketball on military teams while stationed in Germany. Following his time in the military, he attended Texas A&M, playing freshman basketball, and then transferred to the University of Connecticut, where he averaged 13.5 points per game for the Huskies basketball team during the during the 1959-60 season and won three games pitching for the school's baseball team that spring.

== Yankees seasons ==
Sheldon was signed by the New York Yankees in 1960 at the age of 23 (Jim Bouton in his in famous memoir Ball Four, claimed Sheldon hid his age from the Yankees). Making his minor league debut in the Class D Auburn Yankees, Sheldon won 15 games and lost one with 15 complete games.

The following year, Sheldon made the 1961 Yankees' Major League roster out of spring training, survived the May cutdown from 28 to 25 men, and took a turn in the Bombers' starting rotation in July and August. On July 5 and 9, he tossed consecutive complete-game shutouts against the Cleveland Indians and Boston Red Sox, as the Yankees kept pace with the Detroit Tigers in a two-team pennant race—ultimately won by the Yankees in September. Sheldon pitched in 35 games, including 21 starts, and won 11 of 16 decisions. Sheldon, however, did not appear in the 1961 World Series, won by the Yankees in five games over the Cincinnati Reds.

The 1962 season saw Sheldon make 34 total appearances (with 16 starts) and post a 7–8 record and a 5.49 earned run average. The Yankees again won the American League pennant, but again Sheldon was not used in the World Series, a seven-game triumph over the San Francisco Giants. He then spent all of 1963 and the first two months of 1964 back in the minors with Triple-A Richmond.

Recalled by the Yankees in June 1964, Sheldon contributed to their successful pennant defense during a summer-long struggle against the Chicago White Sox and Baltimore Orioles. He appeared in 19 games, with 12 starts, threw three complete game victories and added a save coming out of the bullpen. He then appeared in Games 1 and 7 of the 1964 World Series against the St. Louis Cardinals, hurling 2 2/3 innings pitched of hitless, scoreless relief. The Yankees, however, lost both games and the series to the Redbirds.

== Later MLB career ==
Sheldon began 1965 with three appearances as a relief pitcher out of the Yankee bullpen, but on May 3 he was traded to the cellar-dwelling Kansas City Athletics with Johnny Blanchard for Doc Edwards, a journeyman catcher. Sheldon managed a winning record, 10–8, with a 3.95 earned run average for a Kansas City team that lost 103 games. In 1966, he posted a solid 3.13 ERA in 14 games for the Athletics, even though he lost seven of 11 decisions, through mid-June. Two days before the June 15 trade deadline, he was acquired by the Red Sox, another second-division club, in a six-player trade and plugged into Boston's starting rotation, where he was ineffective. He ended up only 1–6 (4.97) in 23 games for the Red Sox, was traded during the offseason to Cincinnati, and never returned to the majors. He pitched four full seasons of Triple-A ball before retiring after the 1970 campaign. Although he appeared on a Topps baseball card as a member of the Seattle Pilots in the 1969 set (card number 413), he only played for the Seattle Triple-A team the previous year, and never appeared with the major league Pilots in a regular season game.

For his career, Sheldon appeared in 160 Major League games and notched 371 strikeouts in 724 2/3 innings pitched. He allowed 741 hits and 207 bases on balls. He had 17 complete games, four shutouts and two saves. During his off-seasons, Sheldon completed his coursework for a degree in physical education in 1965 from the University of Connecticut.

== Death ==
Sheldon died on August 31, 2026, at the age of 89.
