= Bob Hale (baseball) =

American baseball player (1933–2012)

- First baseman
- Born: November 7, 1933; Sarasota, Florida, U.S.
- Died: September 8, 2012 (aged 78); Park Ridge, Illinois, U.S.
- Batted: Left Threw: Left

MLB debut
- July 4, 1955, for the Baltimore Orioles

Last MLB appearance
- October 1, 1961, for the New York Yankees

MLB statistics
- Batting average: .273
- Hits: 171
- RBI: 89
- Stats at Baseball Reference

Teams
- Baltimore Orioles (1955–1959); Cleveland Indians (1960–1961); New York Yankees (1961)

Robert Houston Hale (November 7, 1933 – September 8, 2012) was an American professional baseball player and a former Major League Baseball first baseman. He threw and batted left-handed and was listed as 5 feet 10 inches (1.78 m) tall and 190 pounds (86 kg).

Born in Sarasota, Florida, Hale attended Lake View High School in Chicago, and was signed by the St. Louis Browns before the 1952 season. In the minor leagues, Hale showed promise in 1953 when he had a batting average of .332 with 30 doubles and had 100 RBI at Aberdeen of the Northern League. The following season, 1954, Hale starred as a member of the York White Roses, leading the Class B Piedmont League in doubles with 35. He also hit ten triples, 12 home runs, and drove in 101 runs in 142 games. Hale continued his offensive tear in the Piedmont circuit with York in 1955, hitting .355 with 12 triples and 65 RBI in just 61 games before being called up to the majors by the Baltimore Orioles.

Hale made his MLB debut with the Orioles on July 4, 1955, with a single in four at bats against the Washington Senators, and would go on to have a very successful first year, batting .357 in 67 games played. He followed that up in 1956 with a career-high 85 games played, but managed only a .237 batting average. After parts of three more seasons where he played sparingly for the Orioles and spent time in the top levels of the minors, Hale was placed on waivers and picked by the Cleveland Indians for the 1960 season. He got into 70 games for Cleveland in 1960, almost exclusively as a pinch hitter, and batted .300 with 12 RBI. But in 1961, his effectiveness diminished and he was hitting only .167 in pinch hitting roles when he was purchased by the New York Yankees on July 28. As a pinch hitter for the Yankees who started one game at first base (on September 21), Hale went 2-for-13 and played his final MLB game on October 1, the game in which Roger Maris set his single-season home run mark. Hale singled in his last at bat off Tracy Stallard of the Boston Red Sox, the hurler who surrendered Maris' blow.

Hale did not appear in the 1961 World Series, won by New York in five games, and played 1962 at Triple-A Richmond before leaving the game.

In 376 MLB games played, Hale registered 171 hits, with 29 doubles, two triples and two homers. He batted .273 lifetime with 89 runs batted in.
