= Tom Metcalf =

American baseball player

- Relief pitcher
- Born: July 16, 1940 (age 86); Amherst, Wisconsin, U.S.
- Batted: Right Threw: Right

MLB debut
- August 4, 1963, for the New York Yankees

Last MLB appearance
- September 20, 1963, for the New York Yankees

MLB statistics
- Win–loss record: 1–0
- Earned run average: 2.77
- Innings pitched: 13
- Stats at Baseball Reference

Teams
- New York Yankees (1963)

Thomas John Metcalf (born July 16, 1940) is an American former professional baseball pitcher who appeared in eight games, all in relief, in Major League Baseball for the 1963 New York Yankees. Born in Amherst, Wisconsin, Metcalf graduated from Lincoln High School in Wisconsin Rapids and attended Northwestern University. He threw and batted right-handed, and stood 6 feet 2 inches (1.88 m) tall during his active career.

He signed with the Yankees in 1961 and was in his third year in their farm system when he was called to the majors in August 1963. He was treated roughly by the Baltimore Orioles in his August 4 debut, allowing a home run to John Orsino, five hits and three earned runs in two innings pitched, but, over his last seven appearances and 11 innings pitched in the majors, he permitted only one run. Metcalf gained a measure of revenge against Baltimore on September 1. He entered the game in the sixth inning with New York trailing 3–0, and worked two innings, allowing three hits and one run. He then departed for a pinch hitter—Mickey Mantle—with the Orioles leading, 4–1. Mantle belted a two-run home run off Mike McCormick to bring the Yankees to within a run, and three batters later, Tom Tresh hit another two-run blast, giving New York a 5–4 lead. Hal Reniff the held the Orioles scoreless, registering a save, and preserving Metcalf's only MLB victory.

The 1963 season was Metcalf's only campaign in the majors. In his eight games pitched and 13 innings, he posted a 1–0 won–lost mark with an earned run average of 2.77, allowing four runs, 12 hits and three bases on balls, with three strikeouts. He retired after the 1965 minor-league season.

Metcalf currently resides in Wisconsin Rapids and is the owner of a local lumber store.
