= Jack Reed (baseball) =

American baseball player (1933–2022)

- Outfielder
- Born: February 2, 1933; Silver City, Mississippi, U.S.
- Died: November 10, 2022 (aged 89); Indianola, Mississippi, U.S.
- Batted: Right Threw: Right

MLB debut
- April 23, 1961, for the New York Yankees

Last MLB appearance
- September 28, 1963, for the New York Yankees

MLB statistics
- Batting average: .233
- Home runs: 1
- Runs batted in: 6
- Stats at Baseball Reference

Teams
- New York Yankees (1961–1963)

Career highlights and awards
- World Series champion (1961, 1962)

John Burwell Reed (February 2, 1933 – November 10, 2022) was an American professional baseball player, an outfielder over all or parts of three seasons (1961–1963) with the New York Yankees. Reed was a member of the 1961 and 1962 World Series champion Yankees, although he did not appear in the latter series. An alumnus of the University of Mississippi, Reed's primary role for the Yankees was as a late-inning defensive replacement for injury-riddled star outfielder Mickey Mantle. For this reason, he was popularly known as Mantle's "caddie."

Reed threw and batted right-handed; he was listed as 6 feet (1.8 m) tall and 185 pounds (84 kg). He spent his entire professional career in the Yankee organization as a player (1953–1955; 1958–1964) and minor league manager (1965–1967). During his Major League career, Reed hit .233 with one home run and six runs batted in in 222 games played (and 129 at-bats). He was only one of seven players in Major League Baseball history with more career games played than plate appearances. He appeared in three games of the 1961 World Series against the Cincinnati Reds (won by the Yankees in five games) as a defensive replacement, spelling Mantle, Héctor López and Johnny Blanchard; he did not have a plate appearance.

On June 24, 1962, Reed hit the only home run of his career in the top of the 22nd inning, as the Yankees beat the Detroit Tigers 9–7 in the longest game in Yankees' history. The blow came off Phil Regan at Tiger Stadium. Reed's 30 MLB hits also included two doubles and one triple.

Reed died on November 10, 2022.
