= Ralph Houk =

American baseball player and coach (1919-2010)

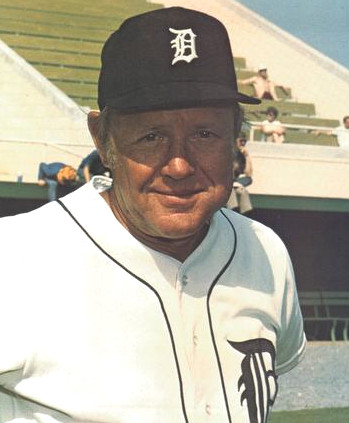
- Houk in 1975
- Catcher / Manager
- Born: August 9, 1919; Lawrence, Kansas, U.S.
- Died: July 21, 2010 (aged 90); Winter Haven, Florida, U.S.
- Batted: Right Threw: Right

MLB debut
- April 26, 1947, for the New York Yankees

Last MLB appearance
- May 1, 1954, for the New York Yankees

MLB statistics
- Batting average: .272
- Hits: 43
- Runs batted in: 20
- Managerial record: 1,619–1,531
- Winning %: .514
- Stats at Baseball Reference
- Managerial record at Baseball Reference

Teams
- As player: New York Yankees (1947–1954); As manager: New York Yankees (1961–1963, 1966–1973); Detroit Tigers (1974–1978); Boston Red Sox (1981–1984); As coach: New York Yankees (1953–1954, 1958–1960)

Career highlights and awards
- 6× World Series champion (1947, 1952, 1953, 1958, 1961, 1962)

Ralph George Houk (/ˈhaʊk/; August 9, 1919 – July 21, 2010), nicknamed "the Major", was an American catcher, coach, manager, and front office executive in Major League Baseball. He is best known as the successor of Casey Stengel as manager of the New York Yankees from 1961 to 1963, when his teams won three consecutive American League pennants and the 1961 and 1962 World Series championships. In 1961 he became the second rookie manager to win 100 games in a season and third rookie manager to win a World Series. He was the first manager to win World Series titles in his first two seasons and the first manager since Hughie Jennings to win three pennants in his first three seasons.

== Playing career ==
A native of Lawrence, Kansas (Stull Community), Houk was a catcher working his way through the Yankees' farm system when the U.S. entered World War II. He enlisted in the armed forces, serving with Company I, 89th Cavalry Reconnaissance Squadron (Mechanized) of the 9th Armored Division in July 1944. He rose to the rank of Major (the source of his Yankees nickname). He was a combat veteran of Bastogne and the Battle of the Bulge, and was awarded the Silver Star with an Oak Leaf Cluster, the Bronze Star with an Oak Leaf Cluster and Purple Heart.

Returning to baseball after the war, Houk eventually reached the major leagues, serving as the Yankees' second- and third-string catcher behind Yogi Berra. A right-handed hitter listed as 5 feet 11 inches (1.80 m) tall and 193 pounds (88 kg), Houk played in only 91 games over eight seasons (1947–1954), finishing with a batting average of .272. Although the Yankees participated in six World Series during that period, Houk had only two at bats (one in 1947, the other in 1952), batting .500.

== Coaching career ==
During his last five years as a major-league player (1950–1954), Houk played in only 31 regular-season games, made 30 total plate appearances, and caught 83 innings. By 1953 he had transitioned to becoming the Yankees' full-time bullpen coach, effectively beginning his managerial apprenticeship.

In 1955 he was named manager of the Yanks' Triple-A affiliate, the Denver Bears of the American Association. Following three highly successful seasons at Denver, culminating with the 1957 league playoff and Junior World Series championships, Houk returned to the Bronx as Stengel's first-base coach from 1958 to 1960. From late May through early June 1960, Houk served as acting manager of the Yanks for 13 games while Stengel, 70, was sidelined by illness. (The team won 7 and lost 6.) Then, after the Yanks lost the 1960 World Series to the Pittsburgh Pirates—and with Houk one of the hottest managerial candidates in baseball—the Yankees "discharged" Stengel (to use Stengel's own words) and promoted Houk.

== A player's manager ==
Houk was known as a "player's manager"—albeit one with a quick temper. Future Los Angeles Dodgers manager Tommy Lasorda briefly played for Houk at Denver and called Houk the best handler of men he ever played for, and modeled his managerial style on him. The Kansas Sports Hall of Fame, of which Houk is a member, describes Houk as "rough, blunt and decisive" and his tantrums in arguments with umpires earned him 45 ejections as a manager in the majors. Houk is tied with Billy Martin for fourteenth place on baseball's "most ejected" list.

The early 1960s Yankees responded to Houk's leadership; the 1961 team led by Roger Maris (61 home runs), Mickey Mantle (54 homers) and Whitey Ford (25 victories) won 109 games and beat the Cincinnati Reds in five games in the World Series. His 1962 club won 96 games, and were victorious over the San Francisco Giants in seven games in the Fall Classic. In 1963, the Yanks won 104 games and rolled to the pennant, but were swept in four games by the Dodgers in the Series.

Not all players found him to be a stellar players' manager, though. He was featured a handful of times in Jim Bouton's book Ball Four, as Bouton was reminiscing about his time with the Yankees in 1969. Houk was described in one instance as "sometimes...99 percent pure bullshit."

== In the Yankees front office ==
Houk moved into the Yankees' front office as general manager on October 23, 1963, replacing Roy Hamey, and Berra, at the end of his playing career, became the Yanks' new manager. The Yankees won the 1964 pennant under Berra after a summer-long struggle with the Baltimore Orioles and Chicago White Sox, but Houk and the Yankee ownership quickly became disenchanted with his work and in late August they made up their mind to fire him regardless of how the season turned out. After the Yankees' seven-game loss to the St. Louis Cardinals in the 1964 World Series, Houk sacked Berra. Later, Houk said that the Yankee brain trust had concluded Berra wasn't ready to be a manager, though he didn't elaborate on the reasoning.

To succeed Berra, he then hired Johnny Keane, who had just resigned as manager of the champion Cardinals. Houk had admired Keane as a competitor in the American Association from almost a decade before and, according to author David Halberstam, the Yankees had made overtures to Keane during the 1964 regular season about becoming their manager for 1965. But the great postwar Yankee dynasty was aged and crumbling, the farm system had seriously deteriorated, and the Kansas City Athletics were no longer a reliable source for major league talent. Keane, a longtime minor league manager, was better suited by temperament for managing young players than established and aging superstars, and his hiring was a failure. The team fell to sixth in 1965—their first losing record since 1925, and only their second since 1918. When they won only four of the first 20 games of 1966, Houk fired Keane on May 7 and named himself manager, assuming that job for the second time.

== Back to the bench ==
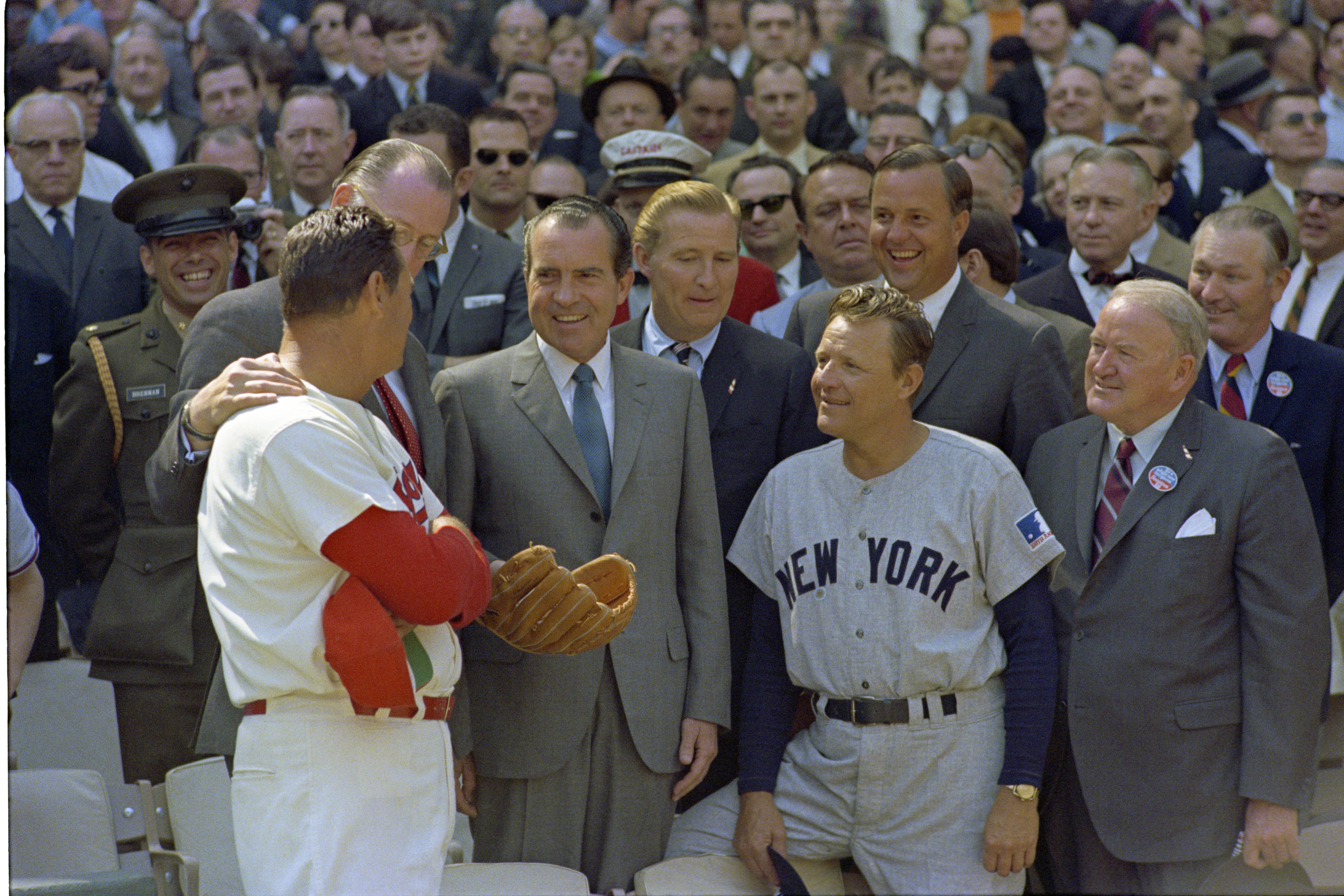
Houk (at front, in Yankees uniform) with Richard Nixon on April 7, 1969

=== Second term with Yankees ===
Houk (eventually succeeded as general manager by Lee MacPhail) thus began a second, and far less successful, term as Yankee manager, finishing the 1966 season. Their talent and farm system both depleted, the Yankees finished in last place for the first time since 1912. A long rebuilding process followed, including Bobby Richardson's retirement (Richardson's roommate, Tony Kubek, had retired because a bad back after the 1965 season) and the trading away of Maris, Clete Boyer and, during the 1967 season, Elston Howard. Houk continued to manage the Yankees from 1967 until 1973. His best season was 1970, when the Yanks won 93 games, but finished 15 games behind the eventual World Series champion Baltimore Orioles.

Despite two years left on a three‐year contract, Houk announced his resignation immediately after a season-ending 8–5 loss to the Detroit Tigers on September 30, 1973, in the final game at Yankee Stadium prior to its closure for a two-year renovation. While first-year team owner George Steinbrenner's commanding style has led some to think the new owner influenced Houk's departure, he told Bill Madden of the New York Daily News it was the constant booing of Yankee fans that pushed him. Houk even said that Steinbrenner insisted he'd get some new players to restore the team's greatness. "And he did, bringing in Catfish and Reggie, " Houk told Madden in Pride of October. "That'll make you good in a hurry!" Apart from a brief stint with the Tigers' Class B affiliate in Augusta, Georgia, he had spent the first 35 years of his adult life on the Yankees' payroll.

=== Detroit Tigers ===
Houk signed a three-year, $225,000 contract to join the Tigers in a similar capacity just less than two weeks later, on October 11. He succeeded former Yankees teammate Billy Martin, who had been fired on September 2 and Joe Schultz, who served in the interim for the remainder of the 1973 season.

Aware of the challenge he was going to face, he stated, "I'm more concerned with winning than rebuilding, but we have to rebuild, there's no doubt about it." A veteran team -- Detroit's 1973 roster averaged 31.8 years of age -- the Tigers were five years removed from winning the World Series and had just had won the AL East in 1972 under Martin. But the team was in need of a rebuild and began moving on from their longtime stars -- including future Hall of Famer Al Kaline, who retired after Houk's first season.

The low point came in 1975, when Houk's team lost 102 games -- at the time the second-most losses in a season in franchise history -- but the 1976 Tigers improved their record by 14 games behind the heroics of rookie pitcher Mark Fidrych, who won 19 games while becoming a national sensation. By 1978, Houk had restored Detroit to respectability and the Tigers won 86 games, but because Houk overpitched Fidrych in far too many games for a rookie, The Bird would only last two more seasons. 1978 was their first winning season since 1973, and the first of 11 consecutive winning seasons -- with future stars of the Sparky Anderson-led 1980s Tigers such as Lou Whitaker, Alan Trammell and Jack Morris.

After the 1978 season, with the roster's average age a youthful 26.3, Houk retired from baseball.

=== Boston Red Sox ===
Houk's name had been linked by the media with the Boston Red Sox' managerial job since his days as a Yankees' coach. After two years of retirement, in the autumn of 1980, Houk, then 61, was ready to get back into baseball. In late October, when the Red Sox called about their opening after they had fired Don Zimmer, he jumped at the chance.

Although not as daunting as his Detroit assignment, Houk faced another rebuilding job: the powerful Boston team of the 1970s was about to lose marquee players such as Carlton Fisk and Fred Lynn and needed to retool its roster. But Houk rose to the challenge, and in four seasons produced three over-.500 teams. On his watch, Boston broke in young players Wade Boggs, Roger Clemens, Bruce Hurst and Marty Barrett. When Houk retired from managing permanently in October 1984, just after his 65th birthday, he bequeathed the core of another pennant winning ballclub (in this case, the 1986 Red Sox) to his successor, John McNamara.

His final record, over 20 years with the Yankees (1961–1963, 1966–1973), Tigers (1974–1978) and Red Sox (1981–1984) was 1,619 wins and 1,531 losses (.514), plus eight wins and eight losses in the World Series. In twenty seasons as manager, he had eleven winning seasons, with six finishes of third or better and five seasons with a finish of sixth or worse. After his first three championship seasons, he never appeared in the postseason.

== Late career ==
Houk served with the Minnesota Twins as a special assistant to general manager Andy MacPhail, Lee's son, from 1987 to 1989 before retiring from the game for good. He thus enjoyed one additional world championship season, when the Twins defeated the Cardinals in the 1987 World Series.

Colorful opinions about Houk can be found in Jim Bouton's classic 1970 memoir, Ball Four. Houk was Bouton's first big league manager and sparred with him over contracts when Houk was the Yankees' GM.

Houk was portrayed by Bruce McGill in the 2001 film 61*.

He died on July 21, 2010, in Winter Haven, Florida, just nineteen days before he would have turned 91. At age 90 he was, at the time, the oldest living manager of a World Series-winning, pennant-winning or post-season team. He was survived by a daughter, Donna; a son, Robert; four grandchildren and 10 great-grandchildren.

On July 22, 2010, the Yankees announced players and coaches would wear a black armband in Houk's memory on the left sleeve of their home and away uniforms for the remainder of the 2010 season.

== Managerial record ==
Team	Year	Regular season					Postseason			
Team	Year	Games	Won	Lost	Win %	Finish	Won	Lost	Win %	Result
NYY	1961	162	109	53	.673	1st in AL	4	1	.800	Won World Series (CIN)
NYY	1962	162	96	66	.593	1st in AL	4	3	.571	Won World Series (SF)
NYY	1963	161	104	57	.646	1st in AL	0	4	.000	Lost World Series (LAD)
NYY	1966	139	66	73	.475	10th in AL	–	–	–	–
NYY	1967	162	72	90	.444	9th in AL	–	–	–	–
NYY	1968	162	83	79	.512	5th in AL	–	–	–	–
NYY	1969	161	80	81	.497	5th in AL East	–	–	–	–
NYY	1970	162	93	69	.574	2nd in AL East	–	–	–	–
NYY	1971	162	82	80	.506	4th in AL East	–	–	–	–
NYY	1972	155	79	76	.510	4th in AL East	–	–	–	–
NYY	1973	162	80	82	.494	4th in AL East	–	–	–	–
NYY total		1750	944	806	.539		8	8	.500	
DET	1974	162	72	90	.444	6th in AL East	–	–	–	–
DET	1975	159	57	102	.358	6th in AL East	–	–	–	–
DET	1976	161	74	87	.460	5th in AL East	–	–	–	–
DET	1977	162	74	88	.457	4th in AL East	–	–	–	–
DET	1978	162	86	76	.531	5th in AL East	–	–	–	–
DET total		806	363	443	.450		0	0	–	
BOS	1981	56	30	26	.536	5th in AL East	–	–	–	–
BOS	1981	52	29	23	.558	2nd in AL East	–	–	–	–
BOS	1982	162	89	73	.549	3rd in AL East	–	–	–	–
BOS	1983	162	78	84	.481	6th in AL East	–	–	–	–
BOS	1984	162	86	76	.531	4th in AL East	–	–	–	–
BOS total		594	312	282	.525		0	0	–	
Total		3150	1619	1531	.514		8	8	.500	

== See also ==
- List of Major League Baseball managers with most career ejections
- List of Major League Baseball managers with most career wins
