= Jim Donohue =

American baseball player (1937–2017)

- Pitcher
- Born: October 31, 1937; St. Louis, Missouri, U.S.
- Died: September 9, 2017 (aged 79); St. Louis, Missouri, U.S.
- Batted: Right Threw: Right

MLB debut
- April 11, 1961, for the Detroit Tigers

Last MLB appearance
- June 22, 1962, for the Minnesota Twins

MLB statistics
- Win–loss record: 6–8
- Earned run average: 4.29
- Strikeouts: 116
- Stats at Baseball Reference

Teams
- Detroit Tigers (1961); Los Angeles Angels (1961–1962); Minnesota Twins (1962)

James Thomas Donohue (October 31, 1937 – September 9, 2017) was an American relief pitcher in Major League Baseball who played for the Detroit Tigers, Los Angeles Angels and Minnesota Twins during 1961 and 1962. A right-hander and native of St. Louis, Missouri, he was listed as 6 feet 4 inches (1.93 m) tall and 190 pounds (86 kg). Donohue attended Rockhurst University, Saint Louis University and the University of Missouri.

== Career ==
=== Minor leagues ===
Donohue was signed by the St. Louis Cardinals before the 1956 season and assigned to the minor league Class D Gainesville G-Men of the Florida State League. In his first full professional season, he posted a 5–6 win–loss record with a 2.08 earned run average in 95 innings pitched. He received a late-season call to join the AAA Omaha club in October, but did not play.

For the 1957 season, Donohue was promoted to the Winnipeg Goldeyes of the Class C Northern League. He appeared in more games and pitched 141 innings to attain a 7–7 record, but his ERA more than doubled, ballooning to 4.34 while having a very high mark for Walks plus hits per inning pitched (WHIP) at 1.589.

The Cardinals invited Donohue to St. Petersburg, Florida for spring training in February 1958. He was later optioned to the Class A York White Roses of the Eastern League. He got off to a very hot start in his 14 games with the team, putting up a perfect 7–0 record with a 1.48 ERA in 10 starts. The exceptional play earned him a mid-season advancement to the Class AA Texas League Houston Buffaloes. Donohue started in prime fashion in his first game, throwing a complete game two-hit shutout against Dallas on June 26. He came across some bad luck a few weeks later, however, as he was out for a week after being hit on July 14 by a line drive on his ankle. Overall at Houston he compiled a 3–7 record with a 4.50 ERA and 89 strikeouts in 82 innings of work. After his most successful season yet, Donohue was selected by the St. Louis Cardinals to participate in the Florida West Coast Winter Instructional League.

Donohue started the 1959 season in Triple-A with the American Association Omaha Cardinals. He pulled double duty as a starter and reliever, starting 18 games and playing the relief role in 16. He put down a 2.43 ERA with 87 strikeouts and a 3–7 record in 132 innings. He also received some brief play around May with the Rochester Red Wings, striking out 10 in 9 innings.

In mid-June 1960, in the midst of a second campaign with Rochester, he was traded to the Los Angeles Dodgers' organization, and finished the campaign with St. Paul, one of the Dodgers' three Triple-A affiliates. That off-season he was selected by the Detroit Tigers in the Rule 5 draft, opening the door for his major league career.

=== Major leagues ===
As a rookie in 1961, Donohue worked in 14 early-season games, all in relief, splitting two decisions and earning a save. But on June 7, 1961, the pennant-contending Tigers swapped him to the Los Angeles Angels, then in their first season as an American League expansion team, for veteran Jerry Casale. The Angels increased Donohue's workload, getting him into 38 games, including seven starts, with Donohue posting a 4–6 won–lost record, with five more saves.

He then began 1962 with the Angels, working in a dozen games (11 of them in relief) until, on May 29, he was traded for a veteran hurler yet again, this time in exchange for the Minnesota Twins' Don Lee. But Donohue was ineffective in six appearances in a Minnesota uniform, losing his only decision and allowing eight earned runs in 101/3 innings pitched. After his final Twins' outing, on June 22 against the Angels, he was sent to Triple-A Vancouver. He pitched in the high minors in the Twins' organization through 1964 before leaving baseball.

In his 70 major league games, which included nine starts, Donohue posted a 6–8 career record with an earned run average of 4.29. He had no complete games and seven saves. In 1551/3 innings pitched, he permitted 152 hits and 82 bases on balls, with 116 strikeouts.

Jim Donohue died September 9, 2017, at age 79 in St. Louis.
