= Danny McDevitt =

American baseball player (1932–2010)

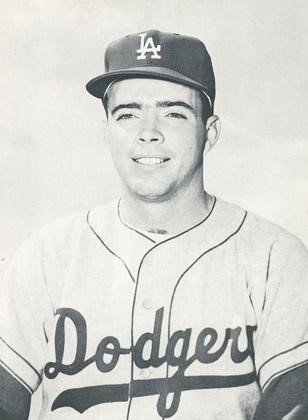
- Pitcher
- Born: November 18, 1932; New York, New York, U.S.
- Died: November 20, 2010 (aged 78); Covington, Georgia, U.S.
- Batted: Left Threw: Left

MLB debut
- June 17, 1957, for the Brooklyn Dodgers

Last MLB appearance
- September 19, 1962, for the Kansas City Athletics

MLB statistics
- Win–loss record: 21–27
- Earned run average: 4.40
- Strikeouts: 303
- Stats at Baseball Reference

Teams
- Brooklyn / Los Angeles Dodgers (1957–1960); New York Yankees (1961); Minnesota Twins (1961); Kansas City Athletics (1962)

Daniel Eugene McDevitt (November 18, 1932 – November 20, 2010) was an American pitcher in Major League Baseball who played from 1957 through 1962 for the Brooklyn/Los Angeles Dodgers, New York Yankees, Minnesota Twins and Kansas City Athletics. The left-hander was listed at 5 feet 10 inches (1.78 m) tall and 170 pounds (77 kg).

McDevitt was born in 1932 in Manhattan. He relocated together with his family to Hallstead, Pennsylvania, where he was a star player on his high school baseball team. He attended St. Bonaventure University in Olean, New York, but dropped out after he was signed by the New York Yankees as an amateur free agent in September 1951. He was released by the Yankees and served in the United States Army during the Korean War before being signed by the Dodgers after the completion of his military service.

McDevitt is most remembered as the starting pitcher for the Dodgers' last home game at Ebbets Field in Brooklyn on September 24, 1957, during his first season in the big leagues. McDevitt threw a 2–0 shutout over the Pittsburgh Pirates in front of a crowd of 6,702, in a game in which he recorded nine strikeouts and gave up five hits. He finished the 1957 season with a 7–4 record, along with 90 strikeouts and an earned run average of 3.25. In October, just weeks after what turned out to be the team's final game in Brooklyn, owner Walter O'Malley announced that the Dodgers would be moving to Los Angeles.

He pitched three more seasons with the Dodgers, achieving a career-best 10 wins against eight losses in 1959, when the Dodgers would go on to win their first World Series championship in California, defeating the Chicago White Sox in six games, though McDevitt did not appear in the series. He played for both the Yankees and the Minnesota Twins during the 1961 season, and ended his big league career with the Kansas City Athletics in 1962.

McDevitt lived in Social Circle, Georgia, and died in Covington, Georgia, aged 78.
