= Pete Burnside =

American baseball player (1930–2022)

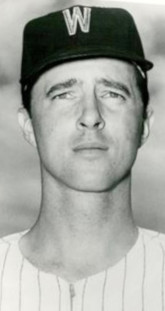
- Pitcher
- Born: July 2, 1930; Evanston, Illinois, U.S.
- Died: August 26, 2022 (aged 92); Wilmette, Illinois, U.S.
- Batted: Right Threw: Left

MLB debut
- September 20, 1955, for the New York Giants

Last MLB appearance
- September 27, 1963, for the Washington Senators

MLB statistics
- Win–loss record: 19–36
- Earned run average: 4.81
- Strikeouts: 303
- Stats at Baseball Reference

Teams
- New York / San Francisco Giants (1955, 1957-1958); Detroit Tigers (1959–1960); Washington Senators (1961–1962); Baltimore Orioles (1963); Washington Senators (1963); Hanshin Tigers (1964–1965) (NPB)

Peter Willits Burnside (July 2, 1930 – August 26, 2022) was an American professional baseball player and left-handed pitcher who appeared in 196 Major League Baseball games in 1955 and from 1957 to 1963 for the New York / San Francisco Giants, Detroit Tigers, Washington Senators and Baltimore Orioles. He was listed as 6 feet 2 inches (1.88 m) tall and 180 pounds (82 kg).

Burnside grew up in Evanston, Illinois, rooting for the Chicago Cubs. He signed with the New York Giants out of high school, under the agreement that he could earn his degree at Dartmouth College while pitching in their minor league system. After a stint in the United States Army, Burnside made his major league debut in 1955, picking up his first win the same year and impressing Carl Hubbell, Giants' Hall of Fame pitcher and farm director. Injuries prevented Burnside's return to the big leagues until 1957, and he only won one of the 16 games he pitched for the Giants in 1957 and 1958. Acquired by the Detroit Tigers for 1959, Burnside spent the whole season in their bullpen that year. Getting a chance to start with the team in 1960, he had a career-high seven wins before being selected by the Washington Senators in the expansion draft.

In 1961, the Senators used Burnside as a starter at the beginning of the year. He lost his rotation spot due to ineffective pitching, altered his delivery, and rejoined the starting rotation in September, throwing two shutouts. He started 1962 in their rotation again but lost his spot; though he set a career high with 20 starts, he also lost a career-high 11 games. He was traded to the Baltimore Orioles after the season, started 1963 in their bullpen, and was reacquired by the Senators following his release in May; however, he had a 6.15 earned run average for Washington. He went to Japan following the season, pitching two years with the Hanshin Tigers of Nippon Professional Baseball before returning to Illinois to become a teacher and coach at New Trier High School, his alma mater.

== Early life ==
Burnside was born July 2, 1930, in Evanston, Illinois. His father Robert, a salesman, married his mother, the former Helen Willits, six years before Burnside's birth—the couple separated in the early 1930s. Burnside grew up a Chicago Cubs fan and often rode the Chicago "L" rapid transit system to Wrigley Field, where his favorite player was Larry French, who, like Burnside, threw left-handed. At New Trier High School in Winnetka, Burnside played basketball and baseball, helping the basketball team post a 13–3 record in his senior year and once throwing 19 straight scoreless innings for the baseball team. The Chicago Cubs gave him a tryout at Wrigley, but he ultimately decided to attend Dartmouth College, choosing not to sign with the Cubs as the minor league baseball season conflicted with the college schedule. However, the New York Giants also pursued him, on the advice of scout Tom Sheehan. Chub Feeney, the Giants' president, was a graduate of Dartmouth and worked out an agreement with Burnside under which the pitcher could wait until the spring semester was over to begin his seasons, allowing him to earn his degree. He signed with the Giants in 1949 but continued his education until 1952, at which point he graduated with a double-major in history and sociology.

== Career ==
Burnside's professional career began in 1949 with the St. Cloud Rox of the Class C Northern League. He only pitched one game for them that year before being limited to throwing batting practice because of a back ailment. In 1950, he appeared in 12 games with the team, going 2–6 but posting a 10.07 earned run average (ERA), the product of 60 walks in only 42 innings of work. He pitched for two teams in 1951: four games for the Ottawa Giants of the Class AAA International League and 14 for the Knoxville Smokies of the Class B Tri-State League. With both of those teams, he had more walks than innings pitched, though his ERA was less than half what it had been the year before. In 1952, he made an appearance with the Minneapolis Millers of the Class AAA American Association-he walked seven and allowed three runs in two innings before getting reassigned to the Nashville Volunteers of the Class AA Southern Association. In nine games for Nashville, he had a 2–3 record and a 4.90 ERA—and then, with the Korean War going on, Burnside was drafted into the United States Army Medical Corps, ending his season.

While in the military, Burnside continued his pitching, drawing national attention by striking out the first 17 batters of a game he pitched for the Hilltoppers, the baseball team for Fort Leonard Wood, in October 1953. He was discharged in 1954 and assigned to Minneapolis. Then, he was sent to Nashville in a trade between the minor league clubs, with Minneapolis receiving Alex Cosmidis. At Nashville again, Burnside had mixed success. He walked a lot of batters and had 16 home runs allowed in 97 innings but did win two games against the Atlanta Crackers (who had the best record in 1954) and was one of two Nashville pitchers to have a winning record. “[Burnside] ha[s] the stuff, in bountiful quantity...it’s only a question of polish and control before [he] is ready to wear [a] Giants uniform” opined Joe King of the Sporting News. Burnside continued to hone his skills in winter ball, joining Giants' stars Willie Mays and Rubén Gómez in helping the Cangrejeros de Santurce win a pennant.

Burnside attended spring training with the Giants in 1955 but was sent to the minors two weeks before the season began. "I’m happy about it,” he said. “I want a chance to pitch regularly and I know I’ll get it here.” His 1955 season in the Class AA Texas League, where he posted an 18–11 record, a 2.47 ERA, and a league-leading 235 strikeouts for the pennant-winning Dallas Eagles, earned him his first big-league call-up to the New York Giants in September. Carl Hubbell, Giants' Hall of Famer and Farm Director, said he was "the most promising pitcher in the chain." He started two late-season games, both in doubleheaders. In his first, on September 20, he issued six bases on balls and allowed seven runs (only two of them earned) in 32/3 innings against the cellar-dwelling Pittsburgh Pirates. While the Giants' offense bailed him out—Burnside departed the game with New York leading 11–7. His early exit kept him from claiming the victory in an eventual 14–8 Giants' triumph; that went to relief ace Hoyt Wilhelm. In his second start a week later, however, Burnside threw a complete game, seven-hitter, earning the win in a 5–2 victory over the Philadelphia Phillies.

In spring training, 1956, Burnside suffered a pulled tendon in his left leg and was sent to Minneapolis shortly before the season began. Then, he broke his left foot and missed much of the first half of the Millers' season with various injuries. When he was healthy, he was not always effective. For example, he had a 1–7 record in his final eight decisions. In 22 games (19 starts), he had a 5–9 record, a 4.62 ERA, 71 strikeouts, and 50 walks in 113 innings. He was called up in September by the Giants but did not appear in any games.

Burnside made the Giants out of spring training for the first time in 1957. He got his second (and last) victory in a Giant uniform April 23, when he threw a complete game, three-hit shutout to defeat the Pirates 1–0 at the Polo Grounds. He failed to get through the inning in three of his next four starts, then got sent to Minneapolis in May, though he was called up at the end of the month when the Giants hit a stretch of 15 games in 13 days. On June 2, he limited the Pirates to two runs in 5 1/3 innings of the second game of a doubleheader but took the loss in a 2–0 defeat. He made three more starts, then was sent back to Minneapolis. Hubbell felt that he was trying too hard in the major leagues and that he did better with the Millers because he relaxed more. Indeed, Burside got off to an 8–0 start with the Millers, finishing 10–5 with a 2.47 ERA and 114 strikeouts in 131 innings. Again, he was called up by the Giants in September but did not appear in any games. In 10 games (nine starts) with the Giants, he had a 1–4 record, an 8.80 ERA, and 18 strikeouts in 30 2/3 innings pitched.

While Burnside did not have a great spring training in 1958, he was added to the Giants' first San Francisco roster because the team did not wish to expose him to waivers. In 1958, Burnside began throwing a new pitch: a sinker. He was used sparingly, only throwing 10 innings through June 4. That day, he entered a game against the Milwaukee Braves that the Giants led 7–4 with two outs in the ninth; Burnside relinquished a game-tying home run to Wes Covington in an eventual 10–9 loss. After that, he was sent to AAA, now the Phoenix Giants of the Pacific Coast League, to finish out the year. He threw three shutouts with Phoenix, posting an 11–7 record, a 3.91 ERA, and 113 strikeouts in 152 innings. With San Francisco, he had a 6.75 ERA in six games (one start). The Giants sold his contract to the Detroit Tigers on October 5, 1958.

"He’s always had a good arm,” Tigers general manager John McHale said of the new acquisition. “We’ve had some good reports on Burnside. Several times he’s been on the verge of establishing himself in the major leagues.” Burnside entered 1959 with another new pitch, a screwball, which he had learned from teammate Marv Grissom in 1958 and practiced in winter ball over the offseason. For the first time in 1959, Burnside spent the whole season in the major leagues. Used exclusively in relief throughout the year, he had his best month in July, allowing only two earned runs in 14 1/3 innings. In 30 games, he had a 1–3 record and a 3.77 ERA in 62 innings.

Burnside competed for a spot in the Tiger rotation in 1960, did not get it, and was assigned to the bullpen to begin the year. On Opening Day, he entered in the 12th inning of a 2–2 tie with the Cleveland Indians and threw four scoreless innings, picking up the win in the 4–2 triumph. After posting a 2.16 ERA in his first seven games, he joined the rotation on the last day of May. He threw a complete game on July 9, allowing one run in a 6–1 victory over the Kansas City Athletics. In his next start, the second game of a doubleheader on July 17, he threw another complete game, limiting the New York Yankees to two runs in a 3–2 victory. After posting a 6.75 ERA through his first four August starts, he was moved back to the bullpen, making only one more start during the rest of the year (a game in which he was pulled after allowing the first three hitters to reach). In 31 games, 15 of which were starts, Burnside had a big-league personal best in victories (seven) to go along with an equal amount of losses. His ERA was 4.28, and he had 71 strikeouts in 113 2/3 innings pitched. The American League expanded to 10 teams after the season, and the Tigers left Burnside unprotected for the expansion draft, allowing the Washington Senators to take him with the eighth overall pick.

Used as a starter at the beginning of the year, Burnside suffered from inconsistency. In one of his better starts on May 12, he only allowed two hits in seven innings against the Boston Red Sox but allowed six walks and two runs and took the loss in a 2–1 defeat. Meanwhile, on June 7 against Cleveland, he left the game in the first inning after walking four of the first seven hitters. Moved to the bullpen in July, he continued to struggle, allowing all four batters he faced to reach (they all would score) on July 21 in a 16–5 loss to the Los Angeles Angels. Then, pitching coach Sid Hudson suggested Burnside shorten his stride on the mound, and Burnside improved enough to return to the rotation in September. Though his record was just 3–3 for the month, he had a 1.80 ERA and threw two shutouts, both coming against the Athletics: a five-hitter on the 16th and a two-hitter on the 29th. “His improvement was sudden but [certain],” Ed Doherty, the Senators' general manager, had to say. “When he had those good days late in the season, there was not a better pitcher in the league.” In 33 games (16 starts), Burnside had a 4–9 record, a 4.53 ERA, ad 56 strikeouts in 113 1/3 innings pitched. He and Bennie Daniels were projected to be the team's top two starters for 1962.

On April 14, 1962, Burnside limited the Indians to four hits and two runs in a 5–2 victory, pitching a complete game that only lasted five innings because of rain. The team was in last place by May 23, when Burnside held the Angels to nine hits and went the distance in a 7–2 victory. He had a winning record (4–3) in his first nine starts of 1962, with a 3.45 ERA. After that, he lost seven of his last eight decisions, as well as his starting spot after August 8. He had an 8.18 ERA in August, allowing 16 runs in 12 innings in the three starts he made that month. He set career highs that year in starts (20), complete games (six), innings (149 2/3), and strikeouts (74) but had a 4.45 ERA and set career highs in losses (11) and home runs allowed (20). On December 5, he and Bob Johnson were traded to the Baltimore Orioles for Marv Breeding, Art Quirk, and Barry Shetrone.

Acquired by the Orioles to replace Billy Hoeft, Burnside was projected by Baltimore manager Billy Hitchcock to be another left-hander for the 1963 Oriole bullpen. He had a 4.91 ERA in five relief appearances for Baltimore through early May of 1963, then drew his unconditional release on May 9. The Houston Colt .45's offered him a tryout, but Burnside re-signed with Washington on May 24, replacing Quirk (a pitcher), who had just been optioned to the minor leagues. He was used mostly in relief this time around, and only allowed one run in seven relief appearances in July. Gil Hodges, manager of the Senators, called Burnside “a front-line reliever” in an article that appeared in the Sporting News in early September, but Burnside posted a 12.19 ERA that month, failing to record an out in either of his last two appearances. In 38 games with the Senators, he had an 0–1 record, a 6.15 ERA, and 23 strikeouts in 67 1/3 innings pitched.

After the 1963 season, the Senators were going to assign Burnside to the Toronto Maple Leafs of the International League; while Burnside did leave the United States after the season, he opted to pitch in Japan instead, signing a deal with the Hanshin Tigers of Nippon Professional Baseball. He appeared in 29 games (19 starts) for Hanshin in 1964, posting a 5–8 record, a 3.36 ERA, and 47 strikeouts in 118 innings. The next year, he again won five games but lost 14, even though his ERA fell to 2.90 in 28 starts. That was his last professional season, as he returned to the United States to earn his master's degree. During his eight-season MLB career, Burnside lost 36 of 55 decisions (for a winning percentage of .345), and in 5671/3 innings pitched he surrendered 607 hits and 230 bases on balls; he fanned 303. He threw 14 complete games and three shutouts and, as a reliever, registered seven saves.

== Later life ==
Burnside met his future wife, Suzette Herbuveaux, while pitching for Phoenix in 1958. The couple was married before he went to Hanshin and had three children, a daughter and two younger sons. Following his baseball career, Burnside obtained his master's degree from Northwestern University, then returned to his high school alma mater, New Trier, where he was a teacher and coach from 1967 through 1993, when he retired. He was lifelong friends with former Senator teammate Don Zimmer. Burnside died August 26, 2022.
