= Jerry Casale =

American baseball player (1933–2019)

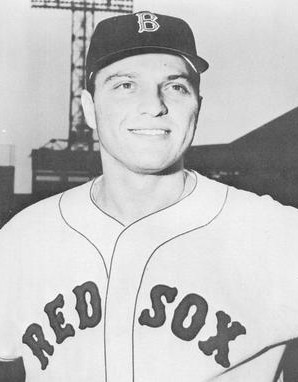
- Pitcher
- Born: September 27, 1933; Brooklyn, New York, U.S.
- Died: February 9, 2019 (aged 85); Paramus, New Jersey, U.S.
- Batted: Right Threw: Right

MLB debut
- September 14, 1958, for the Boston Red Sox

Last MLB appearance
- July 22, 1962, for the Detroit Tigers

MLB statistics
- Win–loss record: 17–24
- Earned run average: 5.08
- Strikeouts: 207
- Stats at Baseball Reference

Teams
- Boston Red Sox (1958–1960); Los Angeles Angels (1961); Detroit Tigers (1961–1962)

Gennaro Joseph "Jerry" Casale (September 27, 1933 – February 9, 2019) was an American starting pitcher in Major League Baseball who played for three teams between 1958 and 1962. Listed at 6 ft 2 in (1.88 m), 200 lb., he batted and threw right-handed.

== Career ==
Casale was originally signed by the Boston Red Sox as an amateur free agent before the 1952 season, receiving a signing bonus of $30,000. He was one of nine spring training recruits of the San Jose Red Sox who had received signing bonuses, which earned the team the nickname "Gold Sox". Of those nine players, only Casale, Marty Keough, and Jerry Zimmerman made it to the major leagues.

Casale in the minor leagues once hit a 560-foot home run while with the San Francisco Seals.

Casale reached the majors in 1958 (he spent two years in the military). He was with the Red Sox for three years. In his first game as a starter he pitched against the Washington Senators and the Red Sox won 7–3. Casale struck out eight and also hit a three-run home run.

He was with the Red Sox for three years before moving to the Los Angeles Angels (1961) and then was traded to the Detroit Tigers (1961–1962) for Jim Donohue. While with the Angels he gave up the first home run for then Red Sox rookie Carl Yastrzemski.

His most productive season in the major leagues came in 1959 with Boston, when he recorded career-highs in wins (13), strikeouts (93), earned run average (ERA) (4.31), complete games (9), innings pitched (179 2/3), and collected two three-hit shutouts against the Chicago White Sox and Cleveland Indians. His .619 win–loss percentage ranked him 10th in the American League.

In a five-season career, Casale posted a 17–24 record with 207 strikeouts in 370 1/3 innings. He also helped himself with the bat, hitting .216 (25-for-116) with four home runs and 15 runs batted in.

After baseball Casale went into the restaurant business. He opened a restaurant in Manhattan called Murray's with former New York Mets players Art Shamsky and Ron Darling, and later opened an Italian restaurant called Pino's on 34th Street in the Murray Hill section of Manhattan.

Casale lived for a time in Staten Island and resided in Secaucus, New Jersey.

Casale died on February 9, 2019, at age 85.
