= Ed Runge =

American baseball umpire (1918-2002)

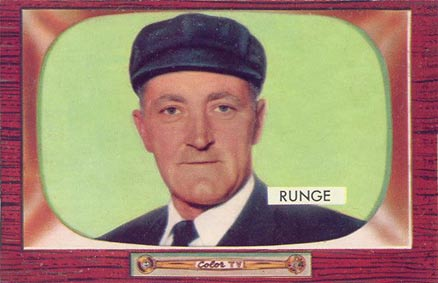
- Born: May 12, 1918; Buffalo, New York, U.S.
- Died: July 25, 2002 (aged 84); San Diego, California, U.S.
- Occupation: MLB umpire

Edward Paul Runge (May 12, 1918 – July 25, 2002) was an American professional baseball umpire. He worked in Major League Baseball between 1954 and 1970. During his career, he officiated three World Series and five All-Star games.

== Early life ==
He was born in Buffalo, New York and lived in Buffalo, San Diego, California, and St. Catharines, Ontario during his childhood.

== Umpiring career ==
Runge's first professional umpiring experience came in the Big State League in Texas in 1947. He was promoted to the Pacific Coast League in 1949. He became a Major League umpire in 1954, working in the American League. He retired in 1970. After his retirement, Runge said of umpiring, "It's the only occupation where a man has to be perfect his first day on the job and then improve over the years."

=== Notable games ===
He was part of the crew that called Don Larsen's perfect game in Game 5 of the 1956 World Series. As the right field umpire, Runge made a critical foul ball call in the fourth inning on a potential home run hit by Duke Snider.

He also was the home plate umpire for Dave Morehead's no-hitter on September 16, 1965.

== Personal life ==
In 1960, Runge testified in court against two Washington men who were accused of attempting to extort money from Runge and fellow umpire Bill McKinley. After Runge and McKinley entered a hotel room with two females, the two men entered the room. The men photographed McKinley and Runge in the company of the women and then held the photograph for blackmail.

He is the father of Paul Runge and grandfather of Brian Runge, both of whom became umpires in the Major Leagues.

== Later life and death ==
In retirement, Runge served as a community liaison and speaker for the San Diego Padres. Runge died in San Diego in 2002.

== See also ==
- List of Major League Baseball umpires (disambiguation)
