= Bill Stafford =

American baseball player (1938-2001)

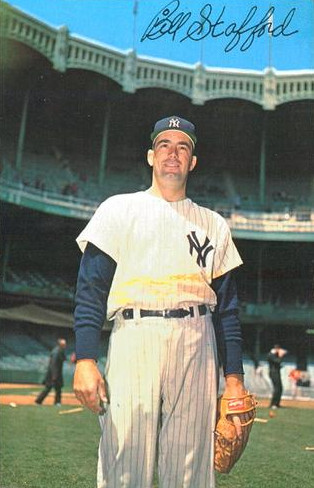
- Pitcher
- Born: August 13, 1938; Catskill, New York, U.S.
- Died: September 19, 2001 (aged 63); Wayne, Michigan, U.S.
- Batted: Right Threw: Right

MLB debut
- August 17, 1960, for the New York Yankees

Last MLB appearance
- September 19, 1967, for the Kansas City Athletics

MLB statistics
- Win–loss record: 43–40
- Earned run average: 3.52
- Strikeouts: 449
- Stats at Baseball Reference

Teams
- New York Yankees (1960–1965); Kansas City Athletics (1966–1967)

Career highlights and awards
- 2× World Series champion (1961, 1962)

William Charles Stafford (August 13, 1938 – September 19, 2001) was an American professional baseball player who pitched in the Major Leagues from 1960 to 1967. Stafford was a successful pitcher for the New York Yankees from 1961 to 1962, winning a combined 28 games in two seasons. He appeared in the World Series 3 times for the Yankees from 1960 to 1962, and was the winning pitcher in Game 3 of the 1962 World Series versus the San Francisco Giants. In September 2001, Stafford died in his home at the age of 63 of a heart attack.

== Pitching stats ==
- 186 Games
- 43 Wins
- 40 Losses
- 9 Saves
- 449 Strikeouts
- 3.52 ERA
- In 1961, Stafford had the second best ERA in the American League with 2.68. On October 1 of that season, he was the winning pitcher when Roger Maris hit his 61st home run of the season, breaking Babe Ruth's single-season record of 60 in 1927.
- As a kid in New York Stafford played at Athens Little League in Athens, New York.
