= Bud Daley =

American baseball player (1932–2024)

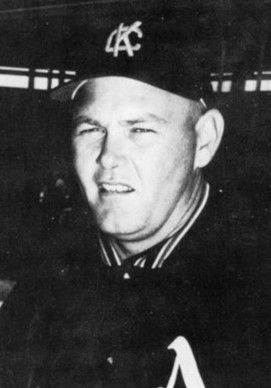
- Pitcher
- Born: October 7, 1932; Orange, California, U.S.
- Died: October 15, 2024 (aged 92); Riverton, Wyoming, U.S.
- Batted: Left Threw: Left

MLB debut
- September 10, 1955, for the Cleveland Indians

Last MLB appearance
- August 26, 1964, for the New York Yankees

MLB statistics
- Win–loss record: 60–64
- Earned run average: 4.03
- Strikeouts: 549
- Stats at Baseball Reference

Teams
- Cleveland Indians (1955–1957); Kansas City Athletics (1958–1961); New York Yankees (1961–1964)

Career highlights and awards
- 4× All-Star (1959–1960²); 2× World Series champion (1961, 1962)

Leavitt Leo "Bud" Daley (October 7, 1932 – October 15, 2024) was an American professional baseball pitcher. He played in Major League Baseball (MLB) from 1955 to 1964 for the Cleveland Indians, Kansas City Athletics, and New York Yankees.

== Biography ==
Leavitt was his father's name. Leo was for St. Leo from his mother's Catholicism. He was called Bud because his mother was an only child and she always wanted a child like her cousin, Buddy Walker. As a player Daley made his home in Orange, California. He was successful in public relations and a skilled speaker. In the offseason he once appeared in seventy-two towns in six states.

Daley was a knuckleball pitcher. who threw curves of two different speeds. He became an All-Star pitcher in 1959 and 1960 for the Kansas City Athletics. During that two-year period, Daley won a total of 32 games, and was 3rd in the American League with 16 wins in 1960. In June 1961, he was traded by Kansas City to the New York Yankees, becoming an impact pitcher as the Yanks won the 1961 World Series over the Cincinnati Reds.

Daley was purchased by the Cleveland Indians from the Sacramento Solons of the Pacific Coast League on August 18, 1955. The purchase price was not revealed. Daley received offers from five other major league clubs. He signed with the Indians because of his friendship with Bob Lemon, whose children Daley used to babysit for.

He dropped his first major league start at Briggs Stadium in a 6–2 loss to the Detroit Tigers. Harvey Kuenn hit an 8th-inning home run in a game in which the Tigers reached Daley for nine of ten hits in the first six innings. Daley was optioned to the Indianapolis Indians on July 4, 1956. On September 7 he was one of 7 players recalled from the American Association farm team.

On March 31, 1958, Daley was traded, along with Gene Woodling and Dick Williams, to the Baltimore Orioles, for Larry Doby and Don Ferrarese. On April 18 Daley was traded to the Athletics for pitcher Arnie Portocarrero.

Daley put together a 4-game win streak in 1959. On June 6 he beat the Orioles 5–1, for his 5th win of the season. He conceded five hits to Baltimore, and afterwards, had allowed only a single run in his previous four games. Casey Stengel selected Daley as one of seven pitchers he picked for the American League All-Star team on July 2. Daley pitched a 5-hitter against the Orioles on July 21. The 8–1 win would have been a shutout except for a homer by Walt Dropo, which Daley gave up with two out in the 9th inning. Kansas City earned its 6th straight victory with a 3–0, 4-hitter, thrown by Daley against Boston, on July 25. For the 7th place Athletics Daley achieved a 16–13 record with a 3.17 ERA in 1959. On July 29 Daley was sidelined with an infected knee, which had hurt while sliding. His record was 11–6. He gained his 12th win against the Washington Senators with relief help from Tom Sturdivant. Daley concluded the 1959 season with a 16–13 record.

Bob Cerv hit two home runs which assisted Daley in stopping a four-game winning streak by the Detroit Tigers, in May 1960. He earned his 10th victory of the season in June with an 11-7 decision over the Boston Red Sox. He yielded 7 earned runs, 4 of them on 2 home runs and a run scoring single by Ted Williams. Daley suffered his 16th setback against the Tigers on October 2, in a 6–4 loss. He had an equal number of wins.

He was traded to the New York Yankees after being relegated to the Kansas City bullpen during the 1961 season. The move impaired his effectiveness as a pitcher. Frank Lane was responsible for trading Daley to the Athletics and then to the Yankees.

Daley knew how to throw a spitball, describing the process to Ned Garver when both were with the Athletics. First, Daley would make his thumb and fingers moist. Then, he would hold them by the white part of the baseball, not on the seams. He tried to squeeze it like a watermelon seed as he threw it. This would keep the ball from spinning and often cause it to sink.

Daley moved to Wyoming in 1975 and later reside in Riverton, Wyoming. Daley died in Riverton, Wyoming, on October 15, 2024, at the age of 92.

== Right arm ==
Daley's right arm was one inch shorter than his left, and he was unable to fully straighten it. It is often rumoured that Daley was born naturally right-handed but developed polio as a child, "withering" his right arm. In fact Daley was born left-handed and his right arm and side were healthy. He did suffer temporary paralysis to his right arm after birth due to forceps pinching a nerve. However, massage and exercise restored the limb to health. Daley's mother, Mrs. E.G. Petzoldt, once said, "No one wanted a baby more than I did. But Buddy was so crippled I didn't want him to live." Although he could barely raise it high enough to comb his hair, Daley himself said that he has been living with it all his life without feeling handicapped a bit. In fact, Daley served as a fifth infielder, was competitive as a batter, shot golf in the low 80s, and was a proficient fisherman.

== Sources ==
- Swaine, Rick (2004). Beating the Breaks: Major League Ballplayers Who Overcame Disabilities. McFarland & Company. p. 192. ISBN 0-7864-1828-1.
