= Hal Reniff =

American baseball player (1938-2004)

- Pitcher
- Born: July 2, 1938; Warren, Ohio, U.S.
- Died: September 7, 2004 (aged 66); Ontario, California, U.S.
- Batted: Right Threw: Right

MLB debut
- June 8, 1961, for the New York Yankees

Last MLB appearance
- September 3, 1967, for the New York Mets

MLB statistics
- Win–loss record: 21–23
- Earned run average: 3.27
- Strikeouts: 314
- Saves: 45
- Stats at Baseball Reference

Teams
- New York Yankees (1961–1967); New York Mets (1967)

Career highlights and awards
- World Series champion (1961)

Harold Eugene Reniff (July 2, 1938 – September 7, 2004) was an American professional baseball player. The right-handed relief pitcher appeared in Major League Baseball for all or parts of seven seasons, from 1961 to 1967, almost exclusively as a member of the New York Yankees. Reniff was listed as 6 feet (1.8 m) tall and 215 pounds (98 kg). He was born in Warren, Ohio, and signed with the Yankees in 1956 after graduating from Chaffey High School in Ontario, California.

Reniff spent five full years in minor league baseball (winning 21 games for the Modesto Reds of the Class C California League in 1959) before he was called up to the Yankees in June 1961. He also spent part of 1962 in the minors, before making the Bombers' bullpen corps for good in 1963. That season, the best of his career, he recorded a career-high 18 saves (sixth in the American League) and posted his finest earned run average (2.62). He pitched in the 1963 and 1964 World Series for the Yankees, allowing two hits and a base on balls, but no runs in 31/3 total innings pitched. He did not get credit for a decision or a save, as the Yankees fell in both Fall Classics to the Los Angeles Dodgers and St. Louis Cardinals, respectively.

The Yankees sold Reniff's contract to the crosstown New York Mets in June 1967, and he completed his major league career on the Mets' bullpen staff, getting into 29 games. Returning to the Yankee organization in 1968, he spent five full years at Triple-A Syracuse, but did not earn a recall to the majors. He retired after the 1972 season, his 17th in pro ball, at age 34. He died in the city of Ontario, aged 66, in 2004.

== Career MLB statistics ==
- 276 games pitched (all in relief)
- 21 wins
- 23 losses
- 45 saves
- 314 strikeouts
- 242 bases on balls
- 383 hits allowed
- 4711/3 innings pitched
- 3.27 earned run average
