= 1961 World Series =

58th edition of Major League Baseball's championship series

Team (Wins)	Managers	Season
New York Yankees (4)	Ralph Houk	109–53, .673, GA: 8
Cincinnati Reds (1)	Fred Hutchinson	93–61, .604, GA: 4
- Dates: October 4–9
- Venue(s): Yankee Stadium (New York); Crosley Field (Cincinnati)
- MVP: Whitey Ford (New York)
- Umpires: Ed Runge (AL), Jocko Conlan (NL), Frank Umont (AL), Augie Donatelli (NL), Bob Stewart (AL: outfield only), Shag Crawford (NL: outfield only)
- Hall of Famers: Umpire: Jocko Conlan; Yankees: Yogi Berra; Whitey Ford; Mickey Mantle; Reds: Frank Robinson

Broadcast
- Television: NBC
- TV announcers: Mel Allen and Joe Garagiola
- Radio: NBC
- Radio announcers: Bob Wolff and Waite Hoyt

The 1961 World Series was the championship series of Major League Baseball's (MLB) 1961 season. The 58th edition of the World Series, it was a best-of-seven playoff that matched the American League (AL) champion New York Yankees against the National League (NL) champion Cincinnati Reds. The Yankees won in five games to earn their 19th championship in 39 seasons. Yankees pitcher Whitey Ford was named the World Series Most Valuable Player, winning two games over 14 scoreless innings, including a complete game shutout in Game 1.

This World Series was surrounded by Cold War political puns pitting the "Reds" against the "Yanks." The louder buzz concerned the "M&M Boys", Yankees hitters Roger Maris and Mickey Mantle, who had spent the season pursuing Babe Ruth's single-season home run record of 60 set in 1927; Mantle finished with 54 while Maris set the record of 61 on the last day of the season.

The Yankees were under the leadership of first-year manager Ralph Houk, a long-time Yankee backup catcher who had succeeded Casey Stengel. The Yankees won the AL pennant, finishing eight games better than the Detroit Tigers. The Yankees also set an MLB record for most home runs in a season with 240. Along with Maris and Mantle, four other Yankees, Yogi Berra, Elston Howard, Bill Skowron, and Johnny Blanchard, hit more than 20 home runs. The pitching staff was led by the Cy Young Award-winner Ford (25–4, 3.21 earned run average).

The underdog Reds, skippered by Fred Hutchinson, finished four games ahead of the Los Angeles Dodgers in the NL and boasted four 20-plus home run hitters of their own: NL MVP Frank Robinson, Gordy Coleman, Gene Freese and Wally Post. The second-base, shortstop, and catcher positions were platooned, while center fielder Vada Pinson led the league in hits with 208 and finished second in batting with a .343 average. Joey Jay (21–10, 3.53) led the staff, along with Jim O'Toole and Bob Purkey.

Ford left the sixth inning of Game 4 due to an injured ankle. He set the record for consecutive scoreless innings during World Series play with 32, when, during the third inning he passed the previous record holder, Babe Ruth, who had pitched 29 2/3 consecutive scoreless innings for the Boston Red Sox in 1916 and 1918. Ford would extend that record to 33 2/3 in the 1962 World Series.

The 1961 five-game series was the shortest since 1954, when the New York Giants swept the Cleveland Indians in four games. The Yankees and the Reds would meet again 15 years later in the 1976 World Series, which the Reds would win in a four-game sweep.

== Summary ==
AL New York Yankees (4) vs. NL Cincinnati Reds (1)

Game	Date	Score	Location	Time	Attendance
1	October 4	Cincinnati Reds – 0, New York Yankees – 2	Yankee Stadium	2:11	62,397
2	October 5	Cincinnati Reds – 6, New York Yankees – 2	Yankee Stadium	2:43	63,083
3	October 7	New York Yankees – 3, Cincinnati Reds – 2	Crosley Field	2:15	32,589
4	October 8	New York Yankees – 7, Cincinnati Reds – 0	Crosley Field	2:27	32,589
5	October 9	New York Yankees – 13, Cincinnati Reds – 5	Crosley Field	3:05	32,589

== Matchups ==
=== Game 1 ===
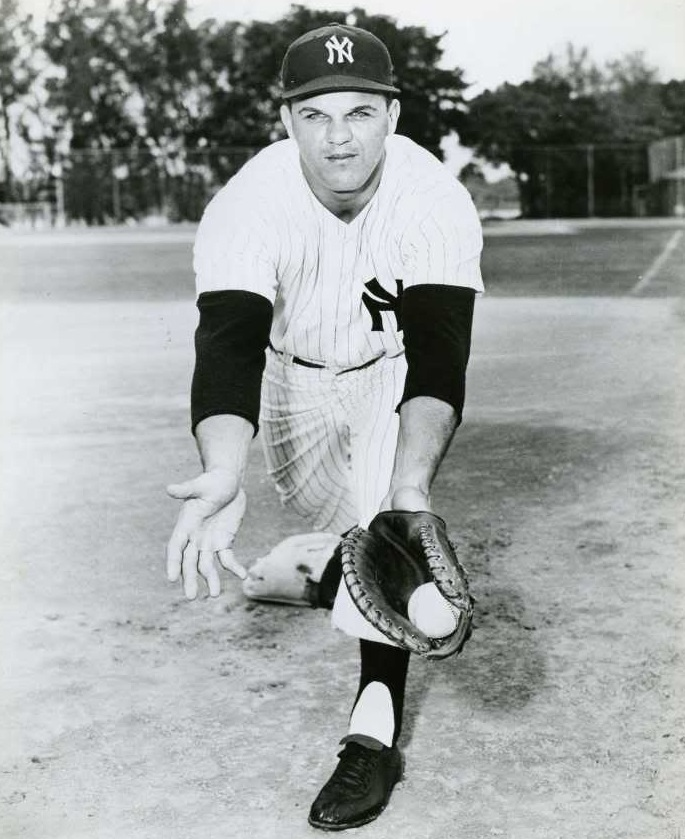
Bill Skowron

Wednesday, October 4, 1961 1:00 pm (ET) at Yankee Stadium in Bronx, New York
Team	1	2	3	4	5	6	7	8	9	R	H	E
Cincinnati	0	0	0	0	0	0	0	0	0	0	2	0
New York	0	0	0	1	0	1	0	0	X	2	6	0
WP: Whitey Ford (1–0) LP: Jim O'Toole (0–1); Home runs: CIN: None; NYY: Elston Howard (1), Bill Skowron (1)

At Yankee Stadium, Whitey Ford tossed his third straight World Series shutout. A fourth-inning home run into the lower right-field stands by Elston Howard was all Ford would need. Moose Skowron added a sixth-inning shot into the lower left-field to make it 2–0. The two-hour, 11-minute game featured only two hits by the Reds, a first-inning single by Eddie Kasko and another in the fifth by Wally Post. The only other Reds baserunner was Frank Robinson, who walked in the seventh. Ford had six strikeouts. Jim O'Toole allowed six hits in seven innings.

Ford was also aided by two excellent defensive plays by third baseman Clete Boyer. In the second inning, Boyer backhanded a ground ball by Reds third baseman Gene Freese close to the bag, wheeled, and threw him out from his knees. In the eighth, Boyer dove to his left onto his stomach after a Dick Gernert ground and also threw Gernert out from his knees.

=== Game 2 ===
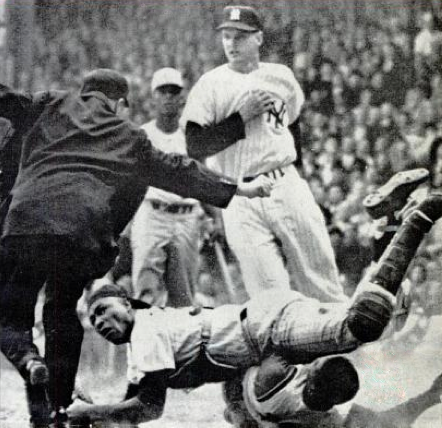
Home plate collision involving Elston Howard

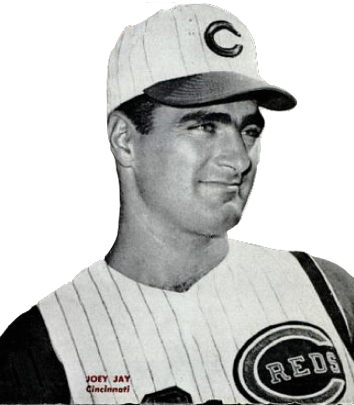
Joey Jay

Thursday, October 5, 1961 1:00 pm (ET) at Yankee Stadium in Bronx, New York
Team	1	2	3	4	5	6	7	8	9	R	H	E
Cincinnati	0	0	0	2	1	1	0	2	0	6	9	0
New York	0	0	0	2	0	0	0	0	0	2	4	3
WP: Joey Jay (1–0) LP: Ralph Terry (0–1); Home runs: CIN: Gordy Coleman (1); NYY: Yogi Berra (1)

The Reds came charging back to win Game 2 and even the series on the superb pitching of Joey Jay. Reds first baseman Gordy Coleman and Yankees' left-fielder Yogi Berra traded two-run homers in the fourth. Coleman hit his into the right-center field bleachers after Frank Robinson reached on an error by Yankees' third-baseman Clete Boyer. After Roger Maris led off the bottom half of the inning with a walk, Berra tied the score with a drive into the lower right-field stands.

From there, Jay would give up only two more hits, a Berra single in the sixth and a Tony Kubek single in the eighth. The Reds went ahead for good with two outs in the fifth when Elio Chacón sprinted home from third on an Elston Howard passed ball that didn't get much further than 15 feet (4.6 m) away. They added one run in the fifth and two in the eighth. Yankee starter Ralph Terry would give up one more run in the sixth on a Wally Post double and a run- scoring single by eighth-place hitter Johnny Edwards, before being lifted in the seventh for pinch-hitter Héctor López.

Luis Arroyo took over in the eighth and walked Robinson, gave up an infield single to Coleman on a roller between third and the mound, and then threw wild to first, with Robinson scoring; Coleman was thrown out trying for third. The next batter, Wally Post, reached safely when Berra misplayed his fly for a three-base error. With Post on third, Gene Freese was intentionally walked for the second time in the game and Edwards followed with his second hit, a bloop double to left, scoring Post. Jay would seal the victory for the Reds by retiring six of the remaining seven batters, allowing only a walk to Clete Boyer in the ninth.

The series shifted to Cincinnati for three games, with the pressure on the Yankees after a split in New York. After falling to a perceived inferior team (the Pittsburgh Pirates) in the seven-game walk-off 1960 World Series, a loss that cost long-time manager Casey Stengel his job, fans and media were wondering if it could happen again: the Yankees had only scored four runs and gotten 10 hits in the first two games, and their vaunted "M&M Boys" were struggling.

=== Game 3 ===
Saturday, October 7, 1961 1:00 pm (EST) at Crosley Field in Cincinnati, Ohio
Team	1	2	3	4	5	6	7	8	9	R	H	E
New York	0	0	0	0	0	0	1	1	1	3	6	1
Cincinnati	0	0	1	0	0	0	1	0	0	2	8	0
WP: Luis Arroyo (1–0) LP: Bob Purkey (0–1); Home runs: NYY: Johnny Blanchard (1), Roger Maris (1); CIN: None

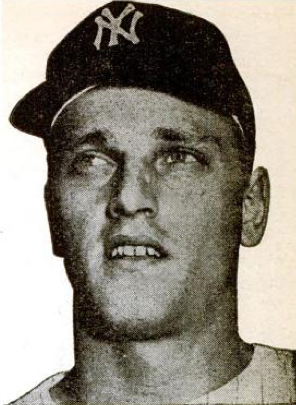
Roger Maris

Cincinnati hosted its first World Series in 21 years at Crosley Field. 99-year-old Dummy Hoy, a former Red and the oldest living former Major League player at the time, threw out the first pitch. He would die two months later following a stroke, five months short of his 100th birthday.

Game 3 pitted New York's 23-year-old right-hander Bill Stafford against Reds' veteran knuckleballer Bob Purkey. Stafford pitched well for 6 2/3 innings. Purkey also had outstanding control and kept the Yankee hitters off balance, but New York triumphed on a Maris home run in the ninth. While the Yankees' offense still was stagnant, it was just good enough.

Cincinnati struck first with a run in the bottom of the third when Elio Chacón beat out a bunt and took second when Stafford threw wildly to first. Eddie Kasko fouled out to Bill Skowron and Vada Pinson grounded out to send Chacón to third before Frank Robinson hit a double off the left-field wall to make it 1–0.

In the seventh, the Yankees got a big break to tie the game. Tony Kubek led off with a single to center, then took second on a Johnny Edwards passed ball. After Mickey Mantle struck out, Yogi Berra blooped a ball into short right field that neither second baseman Chacón nor right fielder Robinson called before the two collided, allowing the ball to drop and Kubek to score. The Reds regained the lead in their half of the inning when Edwards doubled into the right-field corner and eventually scored on a Kasko single to left. Bud Daley came in to relieve Stafford and retired Pinson on a flyout to right to end the inning.

The Reds' lead was short-lived, as the Yankees tied the score in the eighth. With two outs, Johnny Blanchard (pinch-hitting for Daley), smacked a Purkey knuckler into the right-field bleachers. The Reds went quietly in the bottom of the inning, the score tied at 2–2.

In the ninth, Maris recorded the first of his only two hits in the Series, but this one went into the right-field bleachers for a go-ahead home run. With ace reliever Luis Arroyo on the mound for the Yankees in the ninth, the Reds had one last shot. After Gene Freese struck out, Leo Cárdenas, batting for Johnny Edwards, doubled off the left-center field scoreboard. Dick Gernert, pinch-hitting for Purkey, grounded to short, Cardenas holding. The third pinch-hitter in the inning, Gus Bell, ended the Reds' comeback attempt by grounding back to the mound, Arroyo to Skowron, to end the thriller and give the Yankees a two games to one Series lead.

=== Game 4 ===
Sunday, October 8, 1961 1:00 pm (EST) at Crosley Field in Cincinnati, Ohio
Team	1	2	3	4	5	6	7	8	9	R	H	E
New York	0	0	0	1	1	2	3	0	0	7	11	0
Cincinnati	0	0	0	0	0	0	0	0	0	0	5	1
WP: Whitey Ford (2–0) LP: Jim O'Toole (0–2) Sv: Jim Coates (1)

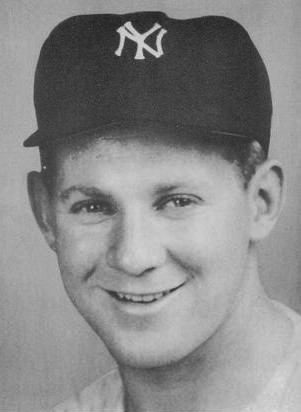
Whitey Ford

Whitey Ford started Game 4 for the Yankees in an attempt to continue his post-season shutout streak, but more importantly to give the Bombers a 3–1 lead in the Series. He accomplished both. Ford retired the first nine batters of the game; when Elio Chacón grounded out to Bobby Richardson at second base for the final out in the third, Ford broke Babe Ruth's record of 29 2/3 consecutive scoreless innings. Ford remained in the game until the end of the fifth, when an apparent ankle injury forced him to leave, his new record at 32 consecutive scoreless innings. Jim Coates entered the game in the sixth and pitched four scoreless innings.

The Yankees scored the game's first run in the fourth. Roger Maris led off with a walk and went to third on a single to left-center by Mickey Mantle. Elston Howard grounded into a double play, Maris scoring. The Yankees added another run in the fifth on a walk to Ford, a Bobby Richardson single to right-center and a run-scoring single by in Tony Kubek.

In the sixth, O'Toole was relieved by Jim Brosnan who got into a jam. With one out, Howard doubled to right-center. After Yogi Berra was intentionally walked, Skowron loaded the bases by beating out a slow roller to third. Clete Boyer then doubled to left to plate two runs. The Yankees put on the safety squeeze, only to have Ford bunt right to Reds first baseman Gordy Coleman who tagged first base. Boyer had moved to third and Skowron had come halfway home before stopping. Coleman then raced across the diamond and tagged Skowron, who was trapped between third and home, for an unassisted double play.

The Yankees would add three more runs in the seventh to put the game away. New York's seven-run output equaled what the Bronx Bombers were able to put up combined in their first three games as solid Reds starting pitching, combined with a wounded Mantle, kept the New York offense sputtering. That would change in Game 5.

=== Game 5 ===
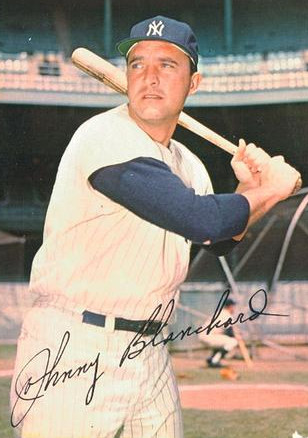
Johnny Blanchard

Monday, October 9, 1961 1:00 pm (EST) at Crosley Field in Cincinnati, Ohio
Team	1	2	3	4	5	6	7	8	9	R	H	E
New York	5	1	0	5	0	2	0	0	0	13	15	1
Cincinnati	0	0	3	0	2	0	0	0	0	5	11	3
WP: Bud Daley (1–0) LP: Joey Jay (1–1); Home runs: NYY: Johnny Blanchard (2), Héctor López (1); CIN: Frank Robinson (1), Wally Post (1)

Future Hall-of-Famers Yogi Berra and Mickey Mantle sat out Game 5, Berra with a stiff shoulder, Mantle still suffering from a hip abscess. But substitutes Héctor López and Johnny Blanchard more than made up for the absence of the two stars. Lopez drove in five runs with a triple, a home run and a sacrifice bunt, and Blanchard had three hits, including a double and a homer.

In the first four games, the Yankees scored a total of nine runs off Cincinnati's starting pitchers. In Game 5, New York scored five in the first inning. Reds starter Joey Jay, with 14 regular-season complete games, would uncharacteristically get just two outs before being relieved. After Bobby Richardson singled to start the game, Jay retired Tony Kubek and Roger Maris on fly balls. But the flood gates opened when Blanchard hit a two-run homer into the right-field bleachers. Elston Howard was awarded a ground-rule double when his blast went through an opening in the left-center field scoreboard. Bill Skowron followed with a long single off the left-field fence, scoring Howard. Jim Maloney entered the game and was greeted with a Lopez triple that scored Skowron. Clete Boyer continued the assault doubling off the scoreboard, scoring Lopez. The ninth batter of the inning, Yankee pitcher Ralph Terry struck out to end the inning but not until five Yankees had touched home plate.

New York added to its lead in the second on a Kubek single and a Maris double just inside the left-field line. The Reds cut the lead in half in the bottom of the third and chased Terry in the process. Don Blasingame led off with a single to center, Eddie Kasko singled to left and Vada Pinson hit a fly moving Blasingame to third. Frank Robinson then took Terry deep with a three-run shot over the right-center field fence. Bud Daley replaced Terry and shut the door on the Reds.

The Yankee offense added to its lead with five runs in the fourth, the big blows were a two-run single by Skowron and a three-run home run to dead center by Lopez. The Reds got a little closer after scoring two runs in the bottom of the fifth (on a two-run Wally Post home run) to cut it to 11–5. Then Yankees finished the rout by added two more runs in the sixth on sacrifices by Lopez (on a squeeze play) and Daley (on a fly ball).

This was the final World Series game ever played at Crosley Field, and the last postseason game in Cincinnati until the team moved to Riverfront Stadium in 1970.

Houk became only the third skipper in history to win the World Series in his first season.

== Composite line score ==
1961 World Series (4–1): New York Yankees (A.L.) over Cincinnati Reds (N.L.)

Team	1	2	3	4	5	6	7	8	9	R	H	E
New York Yankees	5	1	0	9	1	5	4	1	1	27	42	5
Cincinnati Reds	0	0	4	2	3	1	1	2	0	13	35	4
Total attendance: 223,247 Average attendance: 44,649; Winning player's share: $7,389 Losing player's share: $5,356

== Aftermath ==
The Yankees returned to the World Series the next year, and defeated the San Francisco Giants in seven games for their twentieth championship.

The Reds returned to the World Series in 1970 and 1972, but lost both to the Baltimore Orioles and Oakland Athletics in five and seven games respectively. They would win the championship again in 1975 over the Boston Red Sox in seven games to end a 35-year drought after being seven outs away from elimination in Game 7.

The Reds and Yankees would meet again in the World Series in 1976, where the Reds returned the favor and swept the Yankees to repeat as champions.
