= Johnny Blanchard =

American baseball player (1933–2009)

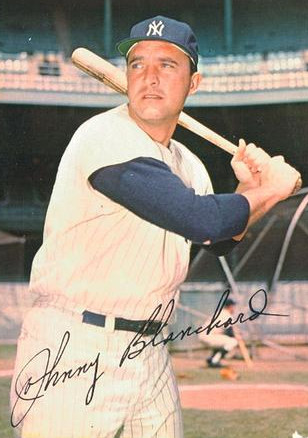
- Blanchard, circa 1964–65
- Outfielder / Catcher
- Born: February 26, 1933; Minneapolis, Minnesota, U.S.
- Died: March 25, 2009 (aged 76); Robbinsdale, Minnesota, U.S.

MLB debut
- September 25, 1955, for the New York Yankees

Last MLB appearance
- September 27, 1965, for the Milwaukee Braves

MLB statistics
- Batting average: .239
- Home runs: 67
- Runs batted in: 200
- Stats at Baseball Reference

Teams
- New York Yankees (1955, 1959–1965); Kansas City Athletics (1965); Milwaukee Braves (1965)

Career highlights and awards
- 2× World Series champion (1961, 1962)

John Edwin Blanchard (February 26, 1933 – March 25, 2009) was an American professional baseball outfielder and catcher. He played in Major League Baseball (MLB) for the New York Yankees, Kansas City Athletics, and Milwaukee Braves.

== Career ==
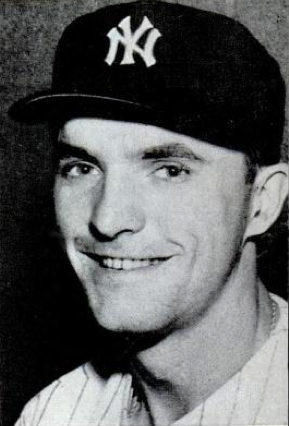
Blanchard, circa 1959

Born in Minneapolis, Minnesota, Blanchard attended DeLaSalle High School before transferring to Central High School, where he played football and basketball in addition to baseball. He played semi-professional baseball in Iowa before being signed by the New York Yankees to a professional contract. After three seasons of playing in the minor leagues, and a two-year period in which he served in the U.S. Army, Blanchard played briefly for the Yankees in 1955. It took Blanchard four years to return to the major leagues, but he gained playing time in 1960 due to injuries to the Yankees' top two catchers. Sportswriter Bill Madden called Blanchard "probably the most famous third-string catcher in baseball history." Blanchard remained with the Yankees through 1965, mainly serving as a backup catcher, and played 93 games during the team's World Series-winning 1961 season, hitting 21 home runs. Among those were four home runs in consecutive at-bats (twice as a pinch hitter) during a three-game span, a total that set a major league record. Blanchard was quoted as saying, "Who am I to hit five?"

A defensive liability for the Yankees for most of his career, Blanchard is probably best known for his play in the 1961 World Series. He hit two home runs in that series against the Cincinnati Reds and batted .400 for the entire series. In his career, Blanchard appeared in the World Series five times for the Yankees and holds the major league record with ten World Series pinch-hit at-bats. Blanchard was the catcher who called the pitch that Bill Mazeroski hit for the first-ever series-ending home run, which was hit off Ralph Terry in the 1960 World Series in which the Pittsburgh Pirates defeated the heavily favored Yankees.

Blanchard was traded to the Kansas City Athletics in 1965, as part of a three-player transaction. He remained with the team until September 1965, when his contract was sold to the Milwaukee Braves. After 10 games with the Braves in 1965, Blanchard did not play baseball in 1966; a comeback attempt in 1968 was unsuccessful. For his major league career, he played in 516 games, posting a .239 batting average, hitting 67 home runs, and driving in 200 runs.

Blanchard was successful in the postseason. In 15 World Series games spanning from 1960 through 1964, he posted a .345 batting average (10-for-29) with 6 runs, 4 doubles, 2 home runs, 5 RBI and 2 bases on balls.

== Broadcasting career ==
He was the color commentator for the first live ESPN game ever broadcast. It took place at Joecks Field in Lannon, Wisconsin on September 7, 1979. It was Game 1 of the American Professional Slowpitch Softball League World Series, a best-of-nine endeavor, between the Milwaukee Schlitz and Kentucky Bourbons.

== Death ==
Blanchard died of a heart attack in North Memorial Medical Center in Robbinsdale, Minnesota on March 25, 2009.. His funeral was held at The Church of St. Mary of the Lake in Plymouth, Minnesota on Monday, March 30, 2009, and he was buried at Fort Snelling National Cemetery.
