= 1959 Cleveland Indians season =

1959 Cleveland Indians
- League: American League
- Ballpark: Cleveland Municipal Stadium
- City: Cleveland, Ohio
- Owners: William R. Daley
- General managers: Frank Lane
- Managers: Joe Gordon
- Television: WEWS-TV (Ken Coleman, Bill McColgan)
- Radio: WERE (Jimmy Dudley, Bob Neal)

The 1959 Cleveland Indians season was the 59th season in franchise history. The Indians finished in second place in the American League with a record of 89 wins and 65 losses, 5 games behind the American League Champion Chicago White Sox.

== Offseason ==
- October 27, 1958: Jay Porter was traded by the Indians to the Washington Senators for Ossie Álvarez.
- November 20, 1958: Don Mossi, Ray Narleski, and Ossie Álvarez were traded by the Indians to the Detroit Tigers for Billy Martin and Al Cicotte.
- December 2, 1958: Vic Wertz and Gary Geiger were traded by the Indians to the Boston Red Sox for Jimmy Piersall.
- January 23, 1959: Earl Averill, Jr. and Morrie Martin were traded by the Indians to the Chicago Cubs for Jim Bolger and John Briggs.

== Regular season ==
On June 10, right fielder Rocky Colavito hit four home runs in one game against the Baltimore Orioles.

=== Season standings ===
American League
Team	W	L	Pct.	GB	Home	Road
Chicago White Sox	94	60	.610	—	47‍–‍30	47‍–‍30
Cleveland Indians	89	65	.578	5	43‍–‍34	46‍–‍31
New York Yankees	79	75	.513	15	40‍–‍37	39‍–‍38
Detroit Tigers	76	78	.494	18	41‍–‍36	35‍–‍42
Boston Red Sox	75	79	.487	19	43‍–‍34	32‍–‍45
Baltimore Orioles	74	80	.481	20	38‍–‍39	36‍–‍41
Kansas City Athletics	66	88	.429	28	37‍–‍40	29‍–‍48
Washington Senators	63	91	.409	31	34‍–‍43	29‍–‍48

=== Record vs. opponents ===
1959 American League record Sources:
Team	BAL	BOS	CWS	CLE	DET	KCA	NYY	WSH
Baltimore	—	8–14	11–11–1	10–12	13–9	8–14	12–10	12–10
Boston	14–8	—	8–14	8–14	11–11	11–11	13–9	10–12
Chicago	11–11–1	14–8	—	15–7	13–9	12–10	13–9–1	16–6
Cleveland	12–10	14–8	7–15	—	14–8	15–7	11–11	16–6
Detroit	9–13	11–11	9–13	8–14	—	15–7	14–8	10–12
Kansas City	14–8	11–11	10–12	7–15	7–15	—	5–17	12–10
New York	10–12	9–13	9–13–1	11–11	8–14	17–5	—	15–7
Washington	10–12	12–10	6–16	6–16	12–10	10–12	7–15	—

=== Notable transactions ===
- April 11, 1959: Mickey Vernon was traded by the Indians to the Milwaukee Braves for Humberto Robinson.
- May 4, 1959: Randy Jackson was traded by the Indians to the Chicago Cubs for Bob Smith.
- June 6, 1959: Jim Bolger and cash were traded by the Indians to the Philadelphia Phillies for Willie Jones.
- September 9, 1959: Chuck Tanner was purchased by the Indians from the Boston Red Sox.

=== Opening Day Lineup ===
Opening Day Starters
#	Name	Position
37	Jimmy Piersall	CF
1	Billy Martin	2B
9	Minnie Miñoso	LF
6	Rocky Colavito	RF
15	Russ Nixon	C
10	Vic Power	1B
3	Woodie Held	3B
4	George Strickland	2B
39	Gary Bell	P

=== Roster ===
1959 Cleveland Indians
Roster
Pitchers: 39 Gary Bell; 32 John Briggs; 48 Dick Brodowski; 20 Al Cicotte; 34 Don Ferrarese; 25 Mike Garcia; 33 Mudcat Grant; 23 Jack Harshman; 23,29 Bobby Locke; 22 Cal McLish; 31 Jim Perry; 23 Bud Podbielan; 29 Humberto Robinson; 27 Herb Score; 28 Bob Smith; 23 Jake Striker	Catchers: 11 Dick Brown; 8 Ed Fitz Gerald; 18 Hal Naragon; 15 Russ Nixon; Infielders: 32 Jim Baxes; 45 Gordy Coleman; 7 Granny Hamner; 3 Woodie Held; 2 Randy Jackson; 12 Willie Jones; 7 Gene Leek; 1 Billy Martin; 18 Billy Moran; 10 Vic Power; 4 George Strickland; 5 Ray Webster	Outfielders: 6 Rocky Colavito; 14 Tito Francona; 30 Carroll Hardy; 9 Minnie Miñoso; 37 Jimmy Piersall; 26 Chuck Tanner; 17 Elmer Valo; Other batters: 45 Jim Bolger; 38 Don Dillard	Manager: 35 Joe Gordon; Coaches: 43 Mel Harder (Pitching); 42 Red Kress (First Base); 21 Bob Lemon; 41 Bill Lobe (Bullpen); 40 Jo-Jo White (Third Base)

== Player stats ==
= Indicates team leader

= Indicates league leader

=== Batting ===
==== Starters by position ====
Note: Pos = Position; G = Games played; AB = At bats; H = Hits; Avg. = Batting average; HR = Home runs; RBI = Runs batted in

Pos	Player	G	AB	H	Avg.	HR	RBI
C	Russ Nixon	82	258	62	.240	1	29
1B	Vic Power	147	595	172	.289	10	60
2B	Billy Martin	73	242	63	.260	9	24
SS	Woodie Held	143	525	132	.251	29	71
3B	George Strickland	132	441	105	.238	3	48
LF	Minnie Miñoso	148	570	172	.302	21	92
CF	Jimmy Piersall	100	317	78	.246	4	30
RF	Rocky Colavito	154	588	151	.257	42*	111

- Tied with Harmon Killebrew (WSH) for league lead

==== Other batters ====
Note: G = Games played; AB = At bats; H = Hits; Avg. = Batting average; HR = Home runs; RBI = Runs batted in

Player	G	AB	H	Avg.	HR	RBI
Tito Francona	122	399	145	.363	20	79
Jim Baxes	77	247	59	.239	15	34
Dick Brown	48	141	31	.220	5	16
Ed Fitz Gerald	49	129	35	.271	1	4
Ray Webster	40	74	15	.203	2	10
Granny Hamner	27	67	11	.164	1	3
Carroll Hardy	32	53	11	.208	0	2
Chuck Tanner	14	48	12	.250	1	5
Hal Naragon	14	36	10	.278	0	5
Gene Leek	13	36	8	.222	1	5
Elmer Valo	34	24	7	.292	0	5
Willie Jones	11	18	4	.222	0	1
Billy Moran	11	17	5	.294	0	2
Gordy Coleman	6	15	8	.533	0	2
Don Dillard	10	10	4	.400	0	1
Jim Bolger	8	7	0	.000	0	0
Randy Jackson	7	7	1	.143	0	0

=== Pitching ===
==== Starting pitchers ====
Note: G = Games pitched; IP = Innings pitched; W = Wins; L = Losses; ERA = Earned run average; SO = Strikeouts

Player	G	IP	W	L	ERA	SO
Cal McLish	35	235.1	19	8	3.63	113
Gary Bell	44	234.0	16	11	4.04	136
Herb Score	30	160.2	9	11	4.71	147
Jake Striker	1	6.2	1	0	2.70	5

==== Other pitchers ====
Note: G = Games pitched; IP = Innings pitched; W = Wins; L = Losses; ERA = Earned run average; SO = Strikeouts

Player	G	IP	W	L	ERA	SO
Mudcat Grant	38	165.1	10	7	4.14	85
Jim Perry	44	153.0	12	10	2.65	79
Bobby Locke	24	77.2	0	1	5.22	17
Don Ferrarese	15	76.0	5	3	3.20	45
Mike Garcia	29	72.0	3	6	4.00	49
Jack Harshman	13	66.0	5	1	2.59	35
Bob Smith	12	29.1	0	1	5.22	17
John Briggs	4	12.2	0	1	5.22	17

==== Relief pitchers ====
Note: G = Games pitched; W = Wins; L = Losses; SV = Saves; ERA = Earned run average; SO = Strikeouts

Player	G	W	L	SV	ERA	SO
Dick Brodowski	18	2	2	5	1.80	9
Al Cicotte	26	3	1	1	5.32	23
Bud Podbielan	6	0	1	0	5.84	5
Humberto Robinson	5	1	0	0	4.15	6

== Awards and honors ==
- First All-Star Game: Rocky Colavito, Vic Power
- Second All-Star Game: Rocky Colavito, Vic Power

=== League leaders ===
- Rocky Colavito, American League leader in home runs (tied)

== Farm system ==
Level	Team	League	Manager
AAA	San Diego Padres	Pacific Coast League	Catfish Metkovich
AA	Mobile Bears	Southern Association	Mel McGaha
A	Reading Indians	Eastern League	Al Hollingsworth
B	Burlington Indians	Carolina League	Pinky May
C	Minot Mallards	Northern League	Ken Landenberger
D	Selma Cloverleafs	Alabama–Florida League	Johnny Lipon
D	North Platte Indians	Nebraska State League	Mark Wylie
D	Batavia Indians	New York–Penn League	Paul O'Dea

LEAGUE CHAMPIONS: Mobile, Selma
