= 1959 Kansas City Athletics season =

1959 Kansas City Athletics
- League: American League
- Ballpark: Municipal Stadium
- City: Kansas City, Missouri
- Record: 66–88 (.429)
- League place: 7th
- Owners: Arnold Johnson
- General managers: Parke Carroll
- Managers: Harry Craft
- Television: WDAF-TV
- Radio: WDAF (Merle Harmon, Bill Grigsby)

The 1959 Kansas City Athletics season was the fifth for the franchise in Kansas City, and its 59th overall. The 1959 Athletics finished seventh in the American League with a record of 66 wins and 88 losses, 28 games behind the AL champion Chicago White Sox. They were managed by Harry Craft, with coach Bob Swift directing the club to a 13–2 record during his two stints as emergency skipper in July.

== Offseason ==
- October 2, 1958: Chico Carrasquel was traded by the Athletics to the Baltimore Orioles for Dick Williams.

== Regular season ==
=== Season standings ===
American League
Team	W	L	Pct.	GB	Home	Road
Chicago White Sox	94	60	.610	—	47‍–‍30	47‍–‍30
Cleveland Indians	89	65	.578	5	43‍–‍34	46‍–‍31
New York Yankees	79	75	.513	15	40‍–‍37	39‍–‍38
Detroit Tigers	76	78	.494	18	41‍–‍36	35‍–‍42
Boston Red Sox	75	79	.487	19	43‍–‍34	32‍–‍45
Baltimore Orioles	74	80	.481	20	38‍–‍39	36‍–‍41
Kansas City Athletics	66	88	.429	28	37‍–‍40	29‍–‍48
Washington Senators	63	91	.409	31	34‍–‍43	29‍–‍48

=== Record vs. opponents ===
1959 American League record Sources:
Team	BAL	BOS	CWS	CLE	DET	KCA	NYY	WSH
Baltimore	—	8–14	11–11–1	10–12	13–9	8–14	12–10	12–10
Boston	14–8	—	8–14	8–14	11–11	11–11	13–9	10–12
Chicago	11–11–1	14–8	—	15–7	13–9	12–10	13–9–1	16–6
Cleveland	12–10	14–8	7–15	—	14–8	15–7	11–11	16–6
Detroit	9–13	11–11	9–13	8–14	—	15–7	14–8	10–12
Kansas City	14–8	11–11	10–12	7–15	7–15	—	5–17	12–10
New York	10–12	9–13	9–13–1	11–11	8–14	17–5	—	15–7
Washington	10–12	12–10	6–16	6–16	12–10	10–12	7–15	—

=== Notable transactions ===
- May 2, 1959: Harry Simpson was traded by the Athletics to the Chicago White Sox for Ray Boone.
- May 26, 1959: Ralph Terry and Héctor López were traded by the Athletics to the New York Yankees for Johnny Kucks, Tom Sturdivant, and Jerry Lumpe.
- August 20, 1959: Ray Boone was selected off waivers from the Athletics by the Milwaukee Braves.
- August 20, 1959: Ray Jablonski was selected off waivers by the Athletics from the St. Louis Cardinals.

=== Roster ===
1959 Kansas City Athletics
Roster
Pitchers: 30 George Brunet; 36 Rip Coleman; 28 Bud Daley; 21 Murry Dickson; 35 Mark Freeman; 31 Ned Garver; 37 Tom Gorman; 34 Bob Grim; 35 Al Grunwald; 38 Ray Herbert; 35 Ken Johnson; 36 Evans Killeen; 26 Johnny Kucks; 36 Marty Kutyna; 20 Russ Meyer; 16 Howie Reed; 32 Tom Sturdivant; 26 Ralph Terry; 15 Dick Tomanek; 20 John Tsitouris	Catchers: 8 Harry Chiti; 12 Frank House; Infielders: 30 Ray Boone; 14 Tom Carroll; 2 Joe DeMaestri; 18 Kent Hadley; 4,30 Ray Jablonski; 4 Lou Klimchock; 10 Héctor López; 11 Jerry Lumpe; 10 Joe Morgan; 5 Harry Simpson; 9 Hal Smith; 1 Wayne Terwilliger; 7 Preston Ward; 23 Dick Williams	Outfielders: 17 Zeke Bella; 33 Bob Cerv; 22 Whitey Herzog; 3 Roger Maris; 14 Russ Snyder; 13 Bill Tuttle; Other batters: 32 Bob Martyn	Manager: 41 Harry Craft; Coaches: 39 Don Heffner; 40 Johnny Sain; 42 Bob Swift

== Player stats ==
= Indicates team leader

=== Batting ===
==== Starters by position ====
Note: Pos = Position; G = Games played; AB = At bats; R = Runs scored; H = Hits; Avg. = Batting average; HR = Home runs; RBI = Runs batted in

Avg.	Player	G	AB	R	H	Avg.	HR	RBI
C	Frank House	98	347	32	82	.236	1	30
1B	Kent Hadley	113	288	40	73	.253	10	39
2B	Jerry Lumpe	108	403	47	98	.243	3	28
3B	Dick Williams	130	488	72	130	.266	16	75
SS	Joe DeMaestri	118	352	31	86	.244	6	34
LF	Bob Cerv	125	463	61	132	.285	20	87
CF	Bill Tuttle	126	463	74	139	.300	7	43
RF	Roger Maris	122	433	69	118	.273	16	72

==== Other batters ====
Note: G = Games played; AB = At bats; R = Runs scored; H = Hits; Avg. = Batting average; HR = Home runs; RBI = Runs batted in

Player	G	AB	R	H	Avg.	HR	RBI
Hal Smith	108	292	36	84	.288	5	31
Russ Snyder	73	243	41	76	.313	3	21
Wayne Terwilliger	74	180	27	48	.267	2	18
Harry Chiti	55	162	20	44	.272	5	25
Héctor López	35	135	22	38	.281	6	24
Ray Boone	61	132	19	36	.273	2	12
Whitey Herzog	38	123	25	36	.293	1	9
Preston Ward	58	109	8	27	.248	2	19
Zeke Bella	47	82	10	17	.207	1	9
Lou Klimchock	17	66	10	18	.273	4	13
Ray Jablonski	25	65	4	17	.262	2	8
Joe Morgan	20	21	2	4	.190	0	3
Harry Simpson	8	14	1	4	.286	1	2
Tom Carroll	14	7	1	1	.143	0	1
Bob Martyn	1	1	0	0	.000	0	0

=== Pitching ===
==== Starting pitchers ====
Note: G = Games pitched; IP = Innings pitched; W = Wins; L = Losses; ERA = Earned run average; SO = Strikeouts

Player	G	IP	W	L	ERA	SO
Bud Daley	39	216.1	16	13	3.16	125
Ned Garver	32	201.0	10	13	3.71	61
Ray Herbert	37	183.2	11	11	4.85	99
Johnny Kucks	33	151.1	8	11	3.87	51
Ralph Terry	9	46.1	2	4	5.24	35
Ken Johnson	2	11.0	1	1	4.09	8

==== Other pitchers ====
Note: G = Games pitched; IP = Innings pitched; W = Wins; L = Losses; ERA = Earned run average; SO = Strikeouts

Player	G	IP	W	L	ERA	SO
Bob Grim	40	125.1	6	10	4.09	65
John Tsitouris	24	83.1	4	3	4.97	50
Rip Coleman	29	81.0	2	10	4.56	54
Howie Reed	6	20.2	0	3	7.40	11
Al Grunwald	6	11.1	0	1	7.94	9

==== Relief pitchers ====
Note: G = Games pitched; W = Wins; L = Losses; SV = Saves; ERA = Earned run average; SO = Strikeouts

Player	G	W	L	SV	ERA	SO
Tom Sturdivant	36	2	6	5	4.65	57
Murry Dickson	38	2	1	0	4.94	36
Russ Meyer	18	1	0	1	4.50	10
Tom Gorman	17	1	0	1	7.08	9
Dick Tomanek	16	0	1	2	6.53	13
Marty Kutyna	4	0	0	1	0.00	1
Evans Killeen	4	0	0	0	4.76	1
Mark Freeman	3	0	0	0	9.82	1
George Brunet	2	0	0	0	11.57	7

== Awards and honors ==
- All-Star Game
  - Roger Maris appeared in his first All-Star Game

== Farm system ==
Level	Team	League	Manager
AAA	Portland Beavers	Pacific Coast League	Tommy Heath
AA	Shreveport Sports	Southern Association	Les Peden
A	Albany Senators	Eastern League	Al Evans
B	Sioux City Soos	Illinois–Indiana–Iowa League	Billy Capps
C	Pocatello Athletics	Pioneer League	Tommy Giordano
D	Grand Island Athletics	Nebraska State League	Art Mazmanian
D	Olean Athletics	New York–Penn League	Bill Robertson
D	Plainview Athletics	Sophomore League	Bobby Hofman
