= John Gabler =

American baseball player (1930–2009)

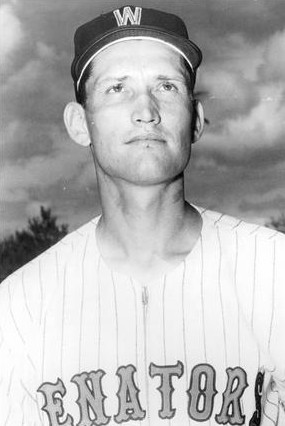
- Pitcher
- Born: October 2, 1930; Kansas City, Missouri, U.S.
- Died: February 7, 2009 (aged 78); Overland Park, Kansas, U.S.
- Batted: Switch Threw: Right

MLB debut
- September 18, 1959, for the New York Yankees

Last MLB appearance
- September 17, 1961, for the Washington Senators

MLB statistics
- Win–loss record: 7–12
- Earned run average: 4.39
- Strikeouts: 63
- Stats at Baseball Reference

Teams
- New York Yankees (1959–1960); Washington Senators (1961)

John Richard Gabler (October 2, 1930 – February 7, 2009) nicknamed "Gab", was an American Major League Baseball pitcher who played in 1959, and 1960 with the New York Yankees, and in 1961 with the Washington Senators. He was a switch hitter and threw right-handed; he stood 6 feet 2 inches (1.88 m) tall and weighed 165 pounds (75 kg).

== Early life ==
Gabler was born in Kansas City, Missouri, to Frederick and Dora (Knake) Gabler. He had one brother, Frederick.

Gabler graduated from Shawnee Mission High School in 1949 and was signed by the Yankees as an amateur free agent after graduation.

== Baseball career ==
Gabler pitched for Class-D Belleville Stags in 1949 and Independence Yankees in 1950 posting losing records with ERAs above 4.00 in both seasons. He moved up to Class C for the 1951 season, but posted another mediocre season, going 10–13 with a 4.50 ERA split between the Twin Falls Cowboys and Joplin Miners, while also walking 138 batters in just 186 innings.

After missing the 1952 and '53 seasons, Gabler returned to the Yankees organization in 1954 and turned in his best season to date, going 13–4 with a 2.93 ERA for the pennant-winning Class-C Modesto Reds, which earned him a promotion to Double-A Birmingham for the 1955 season. after an 8-11 campaign in 1955, he returned to the Barons in 1956 and went 13–7 with a 4.13 ERA.

1957 began the first of three straight seasons with the Triple-A Denver Bears, beginning his stay with a 12–8 record and a 3.89 ERA in 1957. He enjoyed perhaps his finest pro season in 1958, going 19–7 with a 4.27 ERA, setting career highs in wins, starts, complete games, and innings pitched. He also proved to be a serviceable hitter, batting .276 with one home run and 19 RBI while frequently serving as a pinch hitter.

Gabler followed that up with a strong 1959 campaign, going 14–8 with a 3.39 ERA for the Bears. After years of being blocked at the major league level by the wealth of pennant-winning talent on the Yankees, Gabler finally got the call late in the 1959 season, a year where the Yankees finished in third place in the American League and went just 79–75, their worst record since 1925.

Two weeks shy of his 29th birthday, Gabler made his major league debut on September 18, 1959, at Yankee Stadium against the Boston Red Sox. He entered the game in relief of starter Duke Maas with one out in the first inning and three runs already home. After allowing three walks and a single (allowing two more runs to score), Gabler settled down and allowed just one more run the rest of his outing, going 7.2 innings and allowing two runs on six hits, five walks, and six strikeouts, before being lifted for a pinch hitter in the eighth inning.

In his next outing on September 23 against the Washington Senators, Gabler tossed 4.0 innings of relief, allowing one run on five hits and earning his first MLB win. Four days later, he made his first MLB start in the season finale against the Baltimore Orioles at Yankee Stadium, throwing seven scoreless innings, but he allowed three runs in the eighth inning and took the loss. For his rookie year, Gabler was 1–1 with a 2.79 ERA in three appearances (one start) with 10 walks and 11 strikeouts in 19.1 innings pitched.

Gabler broke camp with the Yankees in 1960 and threw 7.0 shutout innings in his season debut against Boston, earning the win. He also collected his first MLB hit in the game. However, that proved to be his season highlight, as he was knocked out in the third inning of his next start and only made two additional starts the rest of the season. Working mostly in relief, Gabler earned his first MLB save (not yet an official statistic) with 3.0 scoreless innings to finish a 10–6 win over the Cleveland Indians.

Following his outing on July 20, Gabler was sent to Triple-A Richmond where he remained the rest of the season, going 4–4 with a 2.71 ERA in 10 appearances (9 starts). At the big league level, Gabler was 3–3 with a 4.15 ERA in 21 appearances (4 starts), walking 32 and striking out 19 in 52.0 innings. While the Yankees won the American League pennant that season, and ultimately lost the 1960 World Series in seven games, Gabler was not around for the postseason.

After the 1960 season, Gabler was left off the Yankees' 40-man roster and he was selected in the Rule 5 Draft by the expansion Washington Senators. Pitching in the nation's capital for the entire 1961 season, Gabler spent most of the season in the bullpen, before moving into the rotation in late July. However, after losing five straight starts from August 9-September 3, Gabler was moved back to the bullpen, where he pitched three more times that season. For the year, he went 3–8 with a 4.86 ERA in 29 games (9 starts), with 37 walks against 44 strikeouts in 92.2 innings. He also collected four saves.

The 1961 season was his last in the majors, as he started the 1962 season at Washington's Triple-A affiliate in Syracuse before being picked up by Cleveland's Triple-A squad in Jacksonville. Between both stops, Gabler went 8–13 with a 4.71 ERA. Approaching his 32nd birthday, the 1962 season was his last in professional baseball.

Gabler finished his MLB career going 7–12 with a 4.39 ERA in 53 games (14 starts), walking 79 and striking out 63 over 164.0 innings and collecting five saves.

In his minor league career, Gabler went 104–80 with a 4.01 ERA over 288 games (146 starts) with 50 complete games over 1592.0 innings. he also batted .208 with five home runs in the minors.

== Later life and death ==
After retiring from baseball, Gabler moved back to Kansas City, where he operated Gabler's Nursery in Overland Park, Kansas, alongside his father and brother, Fred. The nursery was in operation for over 80 years before being closed and demolished in 2018.

Gabler married Shirley Knowlton and the couple had five children together: Cynthia, Karen, Johnna, Fritz, and Patti.

He died on February 7, 2009, at his home in Overland Park, Kansas. He is buried in Monticello Union Cemetery in Shawnee, Kansas.
