= 1959 New York Yankees season =

Season for the Major League Baseball team the New York Yankees

1959 New York Yankees
- League: American League
- Ballpark: Yankee Stadium
- City: New York City
- Record: 79–75 (.513)
- League place: 3rd
- Owners: Dan Topping and Del Webb
- General managers: George Weiss
- Managers: Casey Stengel
- Television: WPIX (Mel Allen, Red Barber, Phil Rizzuto)
- Radio: WMGM (Mel Allen, Red Barber, Phil Rizzuto)

The 1959 New York Yankees season was the 57th season for the team. The team finished in third place in the American League with a record of 79–75, 15 games behind the Chicago White Sox. New York was managed by Casey Stengel. The Yankees played their home games at Yankee Stadium.

This was the only season between 1955 and 1964 in which the Yankees failed to win the American League pennant.

== Offseason ==
- Prior to 1959 season: Elvio Jiménez was signed as an amateur free agent by the Yankees.

== Regular season ==
=== Season standings ===
American League
Team	W	L	Pct.	GB	Home	Road
Chicago White Sox	94	60	.610	—	47‍–‍30	47‍–‍30
Cleveland Indians	89	65	.578	5	43‍–‍34	46‍–‍31
New York Yankees	79	75	.513	15	40‍–‍37	39‍–‍38
Detroit Tigers	76	78	.494	18	41‍–‍36	35‍–‍42
Boston Red Sox	75	79	.487	19	43‍–‍34	32‍–‍45
Baltimore Orioles	74	80	.481	20	38‍–‍39	36‍–‍41
Kansas City Athletics	66	88	.429	28	37‍–‍40	29‍–‍48
Washington Senators	63	91	.409	31	34‍–‍43	29‍–‍48

=== Record vs. opponents ===
1959 American League record Sources:
Team	BAL	BOS	CWS	CLE	DET	KCA	NYY	WSH
Baltimore	—	8–14	11–11–1	10–12	13–9	8–14	12–10	12–10
Boston	14–8	—	8–14	8–14	11–11	11–11	13–9	10–12
Chicago	11–11–1	14–8	—	15–7	13–9	12–10	13–9–1	16–6
Cleveland	12–10	14–8	7–15	—	14–8	15–7	11–11	16–6
Detroit	9–13	11–11	9–13	8–14	—	15–7	14–8	10–12
Kansas City	14–8	11–11	10–12	7–15	7–15	—	5–17	12–10
New York	10–12	9–13	9–13–1	11–11	8–14	17–5	—	15–7
Washington	10–12	12–10	6–16	6–16	12–10	10–12	7–15	—

=== Notable transactions ===
- April 13, 1959: Bobby Del Greco was purchased from the Yankees by the Philadelphia Phillies.
- May 26, 1959: Johnny Kucks, Tom Sturdivant, and Jerry Lumpe were traded by the Yankees to the Kansas City Athletics for Ralph Terry and Héctor López.
- September 11, 1959: Enos Slaughter was selected off waivers from the Yankees by the Milwaukee Braves.

=== Roster ===
1959 New York Yankees
Roster
Pitchers: 22 Gary Blaylock; 22,49 Jim Bronstad; 39 Jim Coates; 28 Art Ditmar; 26 Ryne Duren; 16 Whitey Ford; 45 Mark Freeman; 48 John Gabler; 47 Eli Grba; 53 Johnny Kucks; 18 Don Larsen; 24 Duke Maas; 55 Zach Monroe; 30 Bobby Shantz; 47 Tom Sturdivant; 23 Ralph Terry; 19 Bob Turley	Catchers: 8 Yogi Berra; 38 Johnny Blanchard; Infielders: 34 Clete Boyer; 29 Fritz Brickell; 6 Andy Carey; 32 Elston Howard; 10 Tony Kubek; 11 Héctor López; 11 Jerry Lumpe; 12 Gil McDougald; 1 Bobby Richardson; 14 Bill Skowron; 20 Marv Throneberry	Outfielders: 9 Hank Bauer; 44 Ken Hunt; 7 Mickey Mantle; 15 Jim Pisoni; 25 Norm Siebern; 17 Enos Slaughter; 51 Gordie Windhorn	Manager: 37 Casey Stengel; Coaches: 2 Frankie Crosetti; 35 Ralph Houk; 33 Charlie Keller; 31 Jim Turner

== Player stats ==
=== Batting ===
==== Starters by position ====
Note: Pos = Position; G = Games played; AB = At bats; H = Hits; Avg. = Batting average; HR = Home runs; RBI = Runs batted in

Pos	Player	G	AB	H	Avg.	HR	RBI
C	Yogi Berra	131	472	134	.284	19	69
1B	Bill Skowron	74	282	84	.298	15	59
2B	Bobby Richardson	134	469	141	.301	2	33
SS	Tony Kubek	132	512	143	.279	6	51
3B	Héctor López	112	406	115	.283	16	69
LF	Norm Siebern	120	380	103	.271	11	53
CF	Mickey Mantle	144	541	154	.285	31	75
RF	Hank Bauer	114	341	81	.238	9	39

==== Other batters ====
Note: G = Games played; AB = At bats; H = Hits; Avg. = Batting average; HR = Home runs; RBI = Runs batted in

Player	G	AB	H	Avg.	HR	RBI
Elston Howard	125	443	121	.273	18	73
Gil McDougald	127	434	109	.251	4	34
Marv Throneberry	80	192	46	.240	8	22
Clete Boyer	47	114	20	.175	0	3
Andy Carey	41	101	26	.257	3	9
Enos Slaughter	74	99	17	.172	6	21
Johnny Blanchard	49	59	10	.169	2	4
Jerry Lumpe	18	45	10	.222	0	2
Fritz Brickell	18	39	10	.256	1	4
Jim Pisoni	17	17	3	.176	0	1
Ken Hunt	6	12	4	.333	0	1
Gordie Windhorn	7	11	0	.000	0	0

=== Pitching ===
==== Starting pitchers ====
Note: G = Games pitched; IP = Innings pitched; W = Wins; L = Losses; ERA = Earned run average; SO = Strikeouts

Player	G	IP	W	L	ERA	SO
Whitey Ford	35	204.0	16	10	3.04	114
Art Ditmar	38	202.0	13	9	2.90	96
Bob Turley	33	154.1	8	11	4.32	111
Ralph Terry	24	127.1	3	7	3.39	55
Don Larsen	25	124.2	6	7	4.33	69
Mark Freeman	1	7.0	0	0	2.57	4

==== Other pitchers ====
Note: G = Games pitched; IP = Innings pitched; W = Wins; L = Losses; ERA = Earned run average; SO = Strikeouts

Player	G	IP	W	L	ERA	SO
Duke Maas	38	138.0	14	8	4.43	67
Eli Grba	19	50.1	2	5	6.44	23
Jim Bronstad	16	29.1	0	3	5.22	14
Tom Sturdivant	7	25.1	0	2	4.97	16
John Gabler	3	19.1	1	1	2.79	11

==== Relief pitchers ====
Note: G = Games pitched; W = Wins; L = Losses; SV = Saves; ERA = Earned run average; SO = Strikeouts

Player	G	W	L	SV	ERA	SO
Ryne Duren	41	3	6	14	1.88	96
Jim Coates	37	6	1	3	2.87	64
Bobby Shantz	33	7	3	3	2.38	66
Gary Blaylock	15	0	1	0	3.51	20
Johnny Kucks	9	0	1	0	8.64	9
Zach Monroe	3	0	0	0	5.40	1

== Farm system ==
Level	Team	League	Manager
AAA	Richmond Virginians	International League	Steve Souchock
A	Binghamton Triplets	Eastern League	Charlie Silvera
B	Greensboro Yankees	Carolina League	Vern Hoscheit
C	Modesto Reds	California League	Hal Charnofsky
C	Fargo-Moorhead Twins	Northern League	Dee Phillips
D	St. Petersburg Saints	Florida State League	Tom Hamilton
D	Kearney Yankees	Nebraska State League	Jim Gleeson
D	Auburn Yankees	New York–Penn League	Bob Bauer

LEAGUE CHAMPIONS: Modesto, St. Petersburg
