= Bob Grim (baseball) =

American baseball player (1930–1996)

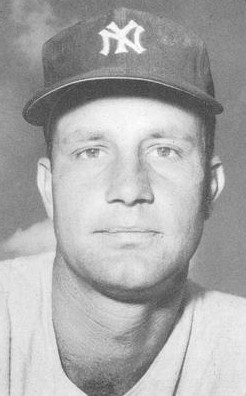
- Pitcher
- Born: March 8, 1930; New York, New York, U.S.
- Died: October 23, 1996 (aged 66); Shawnee, Kansas, U.S.
- Batted: Right Threw: Right

MLB debut
- April 18, 1954, for the New York Yankees

Last MLB appearance
- May 24, 1962, for the Kansas City Athletics

MLB statistics
- Win–loss record: 61–41
- Earned run average: 3.61
- Strikeouts: 443
- Stats at Baseball Reference

Teams
- New York Yankees (1954–1958); Kansas City Athletics (1958–1959); Cleveland Indians (1960); Cincinnati Reds (1960); St. Louis Cardinals (1960); Kansas City Athletics (1962)

Career highlights and awards
- All-Star (1957); World Series champion (1956); AL Rookie of the Year (1954)

Robert Anton Grim (March 8, 1930 – October 23, 1996) was an American pitcher in Major League Baseball.

== Career ==
Born in New York City, he was signed as an amateur free agent by the New York Yankees in 1948. His Major League debut was on April 18, 1954 for the Yankees. He wore uniform number 55 for the Yankees during his entire period on the team. He won 20 games (the first Yankee rookie to win 20 since 1910) and lost only 6 that year, with a 3.26 earned run average, and was voted American League Rookie of the Year, with 15 votes out of 24. He played in two World Series for the Yankees, in 1955 (against the Brooklyn Dodgers) and in 1957 (against the Milwaukee Braves). By 1957, because of arm troubles, he became an exclusive relief pitcher. He has been retroactively listed as leading the American League in saves in 1957 with 19. (At the time, saves were not a regularly calculated statistic.)

Grim got the final out of the 1957 All-Star Game, being brought in from the bullpen with the American League leading 6–5 and getting pinch-hitter Gil Hodges on a game-ending fly out to left field. He also took the loss in Game 4 of the 1957 World Series when he allowed a walk-off home run to Milwaukee Braves third baseman Eddie Mathews.

On June 15, 1958, the Yankees traded Grim, along with Harry Simpson, to the Kansas City Athletics for Duke Maas and Virgil Trucks. He had records of 7–6 and 6–10 for the Athletics the next two seasons. He played with three teams in 1960. On April 5, 1960, he was traded by Kansas City to the Cleveland Indians for Leo Kiely. On May 18, the Cincinnati Reds purchased his contract from Cleveland, and on July 29, the St. Louis Cardinals purchased his contract from Cincinnati. He spent all of 1961 at the Triple-A level in the Redbird organization.

The Cardinals released Grim before the 1962 season. On April 9, 1962, he was signed as a free agent with the Athletics. His final MLB game was played on May 24, and the A's released him on May 31.

== Later life ==
Grim died in Shawnee, Kansas at age 66 after suffering a heart attack while throwing snowballs with neighborhood kids.

== See also ==
- List of Major League Baseball annual saves leaders
