= 1959 Boston Red Sox season =

Major League Baseball season

1959 Boston Red Sox
- League: American League
- Ballpark: Fenway Park
- City: Boston
- Record: 75–79 (.487)
- League place: 5th
- Owners: Tom Yawkey
- President: Tom Yawkey
- General managers: Bucky Harris
- Managers: Pinky Higgins, Rudy York, and Billy Jurges
- Television: WHDH-TV
- Radio: WHDH-AM 850 (Curt Gowdy, Bob Murphy, Bill Crowley)
- Stats: ESPN.com; Baseball Reference

The 1959 Boston Red Sox season was the 59th season in the franchise's Major League Baseball history. The Red Sox finished fifth in the American League (AL) with a record of 75 wins and 79 losses, 19 games behind the AL champion Chicago White Sox.

== Offseason ==
1958 turned out to be Jimmy Piersall's final season with the Red Sox. On December 2, 1958, Piersall was traded to the Cleveland Indians in exchange for Gary Geiger and Vic Wertz.

=== Notable transactions ===
- Prior to 1959 season: Mike Page was signed as an amateur free agent by the Red Sox.
- March 9, 1959: Bob Smith was traded by the Red Sox to the Chicago Cubs for Chuck Tanner.

== Regular season ==
- The 1959 season was the year that the color barrier was broken for the Red Sox. On July 21, Elijah "Pumpsie" Green became the first black player to play for the Red Sox. A week later, Earl Wilson became the first black pitcher to play for the team.
- Ted Williams would have an off year in his penultimate season, as he batted below .300.

=== Season standings ===
American League
Team	W	L	Pct.	GB	Home	Road
Chicago White Sox	94	60	.610	—	47‍–‍30	47‍–‍30
Cleveland Indians	89	65	.578	5	43‍–‍34	46‍–‍31
New York Yankees	79	75	.513	15	40‍–‍37	39‍–‍38
Detroit Tigers	76	78	.494	18	41‍–‍36	35‍–‍42
Boston Red Sox	75	79	.487	19	43‍–‍34	32‍–‍45
Baltimore Orioles	74	80	.481	20	38‍–‍39	36‍–‍41
Kansas City Athletics	66	88	.429	28	37‍–‍40	29‍–‍48
Washington Senators	63	91	.409	31	34‍–‍43	29‍–‍48

=== Record vs. opponents ===
1959 American League record Sources:
Team	BAL	BOS	CWS	CLE	DET	KCA	NYY	WSH
Baltimore	—	8–14	11–11–1	10–12	13–9	8–14	12–10	12–10
Boston	14–8	—	8–14	8–14	11–11	11–11	13–9	10–12
Chicago	11–11–1	14–8	—	15–7	13–9	12–10	13–9–1	16–6
Cleveland	12–10	14–8	7–15	—	14–8	15–7	11–11	16–6
Detroit	9–13	11–11	9–13	8–14	—	15–7	14–8	10–12
Kansas City	14–8	11–11	10–12	7–15	7–15	—	5–17	12–10
New York	10–12	9–13	9–13–1	11–11	8–14	17–5	—	15–7
Washington	10–12	12–10	6–16	6–16	12–10	10–12	7–15	—

=== Notable transactions ===
- July 26, 1959: Bud Byerly was traded by the Red Sox to the San Francisco Giants for Billy Muffett and cash.
- September 9, 1959: Chuck Tanner was sold by Red Sox to Cleveland Indians.

=== Opening day lineup ===
24	Don Buddin	SS
3	Pete Runnels	2B
10	Gene Stephens	CF
6	Vic Wertz	1B
4	Jackie Jensen	RF
11	Frank Malzone	3B
37	Gary Geiger	RF
22	Sammy White	C
23	Tom Brewer	P

== Roster ==
1959 Boston Red Sox
Roster
Pitchers: 15 Frank Baumann; 28 Ted Bowsfield; 23 Tom Brewer; 19 Jerry Casale; 28 Nelson Chittum; 14 Ike Delock; 20 Mike Fornieles; 39 Jack Harshman; 39 Billy Hoeft; 17 Leo Kiely; 42 Herb Moford; 27 Bill Monbouquette; 30 Al Schroll; 39 Dave Sisler; 18 Frank Sullivan; 26 Murray Wall; 28 Ted Wills; 26 Earl Wilson	Catchers: 8 Pete Daley; 35 Don Gile; 16 Haywood Sullivan; 22 Sammy White; Infielders: 12 Bobby Ávila; 24 Don Buddin; 1 Billy Consolo; 25 Dick Gernert; 12 Pumpsie Green; 12 Ted Lepcio; 1 Jim Mahoney; 11 Frank Malzone; 1 Herb Plews; 3 Pete Runnels; 6 Vic Wertz	Outfielders: 7 Jim Busby; 37 Gary Geiger; 4 Jackie Jensen; 2 Marty Keough; 39 Jerry Mallett; 30 Bill Renna; 10 Gene Stephens; 9 Ted Williams	Manager: 5 Pinky Higgins; 34 Rudy York; 16 Billy Jurges; Coaches: 32 Del Baker; 31 Jack Burns (Third base); 33 Dave Ferriss (Pitching); 34 Rudy York (First base & Hitting)

== Player stats ==
=== Batting ===
==== Starters by position ====
Note: Pos = Position; G = Games played; AB = At bats; H = Hits; Avg. = Batting average; HR = Home runs; RBI = Runs batted in

Pos	Player	G	AB	H	Avg.	HR	RBI
C	Sammy White	119	377	107	.284	1	42
1B	Dick Gernert	117	298	78	.262	11	42
2B	Pete Runnels	147	560	176	.314	6	57
SS	Don Buddin	151	485	117	.241	10	53
3B	Frank Malzone	154	604	169	.280	19	92
LF	Ted Williams	103	272	69	.254	10	43
CF	Marty Keough	96	251	61	.243	7	27
RF	Jackie Jensen	148	535	148	.277	28	112

==== Other batters ====
Note: G = Games played; AB = At bats; H = Hits; Avg. = Batting average; HR = Home runs; RBI = Runs batted in

Player	G	AB	H	Avg.	HR	RBI
Gary Geiger	120	335	82	.245	11	48
Gene Stephens	92	270	75	.278	3	39
Vic Wertz	94	247	68	.275	7	49
Pumpsie Green	50	172	40	.233	1	10
Pete Daley	65	169	38	.225	1	11
Jim Busby	61	102	23	.225	1	5
Bobby Ávila	22	45	11	.244	3	6
Jim Mahoney	31	23	3	.130	1	4
Bill Renna	14	22	2	.091	0	2
Jerry Mallett	4	15	4	.267	0	1
Billy Consolo	10	14	3	.214	0	0
Herb Plews	13	12	1	.083	0	0
Don Gile	3	10	2	.200	0	1
Ted Lepcio	3	3	1	.333	0	1
Haywood Sullivan	4	2	0	.000	0	0

=== Pitching ===
==== Starting pitchers ====
Note: G = Games pitched; IP = Innings pitched; W = Wins; L = Losses; ERA = Earned run average; SO = Strikeouts

Player	G	IP	W	L	ERA	SO
Tom Brewer	36	215.1	10	12	3.76	121
Jerry Casale	31	179.2	13	8	4.31	93
Frank Sullivan	30	177.2	9	11	3.95	107
Ted Wills	9	56.1	2	6	5.27	24

==== Other pitchers ====
Note: G = Games pitched; IP = Innings pitched; W = Wins; L = Losses; ERA = Earned run average; SO = Strikeouts

Player	G	IP	W	L	ERA	SO
Bill Monbouquette	34	151.2	7	7	4.15	87
Ike Delock	28	134.1	11	6	2.95	55
Frank Baumann	26	95.2	6	4	4.05	48
Al Schroll	14	46.0	1	4	4.70	26
Jack Harshman	8	24.2	2	3	6.57	14
Earl Wilson	9	23.2	1	1	6.08	17
Billy Hoeft	5	17.2	0	3	5.60	8
Ted Bowsfield	5	9.0	0	1	15.00	4
Herb Moford	4	8.2	0	2	11.42	7

==== Relief pitchers ====
Note: G = Games pitched; W = Wins; L = Losses; SV = Saves; ERA = Earned run average; SO = Strikeouts

Player	G	W	L	SV	ERA	SO
Mike Fornieles	46	5	3	11	3.07	54
Leo Kiely	41	3	3	7	4.20	30
Murray Wall	26	2	5	3	5.51	14
Nelson Chittum	21	3	0	0	1.19	12
Dave Sisler	3	0	0	0	6.75	3

== Awards and honors ==
- Jackie Jensen, Gold Glove Award (OF)
- Frank Malzone, Gold Glove Award (3B)

== Farm system ==
Level	Team	League	Manager
AAA	Minneapolis Millers	American Association	Gene Mauch
A	Allentown Red Sox	Eastern League	Sheriff Robinson
B	Raleigh Capitals	Carolina League	Ken Deal
D	Waterloo Hawks	Midwest League	Elmer Yoter
D	Corning Cor-Sox	New York–Penn League	Len Okrie
D	Alpine Cowboys	Sophomore League	Eddie Popowski

LEAGUE CHAMPIONS: Minneapolis, Waterloo, Alpine

== See also ==
- List of first black Major League Baseball players by team and date
