= 1959 Chicago White Sox season =

1959 Chicago White Sox
- American League champions
- League: American League
- Ballpark: Comiskey Park
- City: Chicago
- Record: 94–60 (.610)
- League place: 1st
- Owners: Dorothy Comiskey Rigney, Bill Veeck
- General managers: Chuck Comiskey/Johnny Rigney, Bill Veeck
- Managers: Al López
- Television: WGN-TV (Jack Brickhouse, Vince Lloyd)
- Radio: WCFL (Bob Elson, Don Wells)

The 1959 Chicago White Sox season was the team's 59th season in the major leagues, and its 60th season overall. They finished with a record of 94–60, good enough to win the American League (AL) championship, five games ahead of the second place Cleveland Indians. It was the team's first pennant since 1919 and would be its last until their championship season of 2005.

== Offseason ==
- December 1, 1958: 1958 rule 5 draft
  - Claude Raymond was drafted by the White Sox from the Milwaukee Braves.
  - Lou Skizas was drafted by the White Sox from the Detroit Tigers.

== Regular season ==
In 1959, the team won its first pennant in 40 years, thanks to the efforts of several eventual Hall of Famers – manager Al López, Luis Aparicio, Nellie Fox (the league MVP), and pitcher Early Wynn, who won the Cy Young Award at a time when only one award was presented for both leagues. Veteran catcher Sherm Lollar provided quiet leadership on and off the field, leading the team in home runs and RBIs. The White Sox also acquired slugger Ted Kluszewski in August, a local area native, from the Pittsburgh Pirates for the final pennant push. Kluszewski gave the team the needed power-hitting for the stretch run and hit nearly .300 in the final month of play for the White Sox. Lopez had also managed the Cleveland Indians to the World Series in 1954, making him the only manager to interrupt the New York Yankees pennant run between 1949 and 1964.

After the pennant-clinching victory, Chicago Mayor Richard J. Daley, a lifelong White Sox fan, ordered his fire chief to set off the city's air raid sirens. Many Chicagoans became fearful and confused since 1959 was the height of the Cold War; however, they relaxed somewhat upon realizing it was part of the White Sox' celebration. The Sox won Game 1 of the World Series 11–0 on the strength of Kluszewski's two home runs, their last postseason home win until 2005. The Los Angeles Dodgers, however, won three of the next four games and captured their first World Series championship since moving to the west coast in 1958. 92,706 fans witnessed Game 5 of the World Series at the Los Angeles Memorial Coliseum, the most ever to attend a World Series game, or for that matter any non-exhibition major league baseball game. The White Sox won that game 1–0 over the Dodgers' 23-year-old pitcher Sandy Koufax, but the Dodgers clinched the series by beating the Sox 9–3 two days later at Comiskey Park.

Fox became the last player in the 20th century to have five hits on Opening Day.

=== Season standings ===
American League
Team	W	L	Pct.	GB	Home	Road
Chicago White Sox	94	60	.610	—	47‍–‍30	47‍–‍30
Cleveland Indians	89	65	.578	5	43‍–‍34	46‍–‍31
New York Yankees	79	75	.513	15	40‍–‍37	39‍–‍38
Detroit Tigers	76	78	.494	18	41‍–‍36	35‍–‍42
Boston Red Sox	75	79	.487	19	43‍–‍34	32‍–‍45
Baltimore Orioles	74	80	.481	20	38‍–‍39	36‍–‍41
Kansas City Athletics	66	88	.429	28	37‍–‍40	29‍–‍48
Washington Senators	63	91	.409	31	34‍–‍43	29‍–‍48

=== Record vs. opponents ===
1959 American League record Sources:
Team	BAL	BOS	CWS	CLE	DET	KCA	NYY	WSH
Baltimore	—	8–14	11–11–1	10–12	13–9	8–14	12–10	12–10
Boston	14–8	—	8–14	8–14	11–11	11–11	13–9	10–12
Chicago	11–11–1	14–8	—	15–7	13–9	12–10	13–9–1	16–6
Cleveland	12–10	14–8	7–15	—	14–8	15–7	11–11	16–6
Detroit	9–13	11–11	9–13	8–14	—	15–7	14–8	10–12
Kansas City	14–8	11–11	10–12	7–15	7–15	—	5–17	12–10
New York	10–12	9–13	9–13–1	11–11	8–14	17–5	—	15–7
Washington	10–12	12–10	6–16	6–16	12–10	10–12	7–15	—

=== Notable transactions ===
- May 1, 1959: Lou Skizas and Don Rudolph were traded by the White Sox to the Cincinnati Redlegs for Del Ennis.
- May 2, 1959: Ray Boone was traded by the White Sox to the Kansas City Athletics for Harry Simpson.
- May 11, 1959: Claude Raymond was returned by the White Sox to the Milwaukee Braves.
- August 25, 1959: Ted Kluszewski was traded to the White Sox from Pittsburgh for outfielder Harry Simpson and minor league pitcher Bob Sagers.

=== Opening Day lineup ===
- Luis Aparicio, SS
- Nellie Fox, 2B
- Jim Landis, CF
- Sherm Lollar, C
- Norm Cash, 1B
- Al Smith, RF
- Johnny Callison, LF
- Bubba Phillips, 3B
- Billy Pierce, P

=== Roster ===
1959 Chicago White Sox
Roster
Pitchers: 25 Rudy Árias; 22 Dick Donovan; 18 Barry Latman; 27 Turk Lown; 15 Ken McBride; 29 Ray Moore; 12 Gary Peters; 19 Billy Pierce; 28 Claude Raymond; 15 Don Rudolph; 35 Bob Shaw; 21 Gerry Staley; 36 Joe Stanka; 24 Early Wynn	Catchers: 26 Earl Battey; 44 Cam Carreon; 10 Sherm Lollar; 20 Johnny Romano; Infielders: 11 Luis Aparicio; 8 Ray Boone; 38 Norm Cash; 14 Sammy Esposito; 2 Nellie Fox; 6 Billy Goodman; 4 Ron Jackson; 4,8 Ted Kluszewski; 32 J. C. Martin; 5 Bubba Phillips; 17 Earl Torgeson	Outfielders: 9 Johnny Callison; 32 Larry Doby; 3 Del Ennis; 28 Joe Hicks; 1 Jim Landis; 3 Jim McAnany; 7 Jim Rivera; 8 Harry Simpson; 3 Lou Skizas; 16 Al Smith; Other batters: 32 Don Mueller	Manager: 42 Al López; Coaches: 37 Ray Berres; 34 Johnny Cooney; 33 Tony Cuccinello; 39 Don Gutteridge

== Player stats ==
=== Batting ===
Note: G = Games played; AB = At bats; R = Runs scored; H = Hits; 2B = Doubles; 3B = Triples; HR = Home runs; RBI = Runs batted in; BB = Base on balls; SO = Strikeouts; AVG = Batting average; SB = Stolen bases

Player	G	AB	R	H	2B	3B	HR	RBI	BB	SO	AVG	SB
Luis Aparicio, SS	152	612	98	157	18	5	6	51	53	40	.257	56
Earl Battey, C	26	64	9	14	1	2	2	7	8	13	.219	0
Ray Boone, 1B	9	21	3	5	0	0	1	5	7	5	.238	1
Johnny Callison, LF	49	104	12	18	3	0	3	12	13	20	.173	0
Cam Carreon, C	1	1	0	0	0	0	0	0	0	0	.000	0
Norm Cash, 1B	58	104	16	25	0	1	4	16	18	9	.240	1
Larry Doby, OF, 1B	21	58	1	14	1	1	0	9	2	13	.241	1
Del Ennis, LF	26	96	10	21	6	0	2	7	4	10	.219	0
Sammy Esposito, 3B, SS	69	66	12	11	1	0	1	5	11	16	.167	0
Nellie Fox, 2B	156	624	84	191	34	6	2	70	71	13	.306	5
Billy Goodman, 3B	104	268	21	67	14	1	1	28	19	20	.250	3
Joe Hicks, CF	6	7	0	3	0	0	0	0	1	1	.429	0
Ron Jackson, 1B	10	14	3	3	1	0	1	2	1	0	.214	0
Ted Kluszewski, 1B	31	101	11	30	2	1	2	10	9	10	.297	0
Jim Landis, CF	149	515	78	140	26	7	5	60	78	68	.272	20
Sherm Lollar, C	140	505	63	134	22	3	22	84	55	49	.269	4
J. C. Martin, 3B	3	4	0	1	0	0	0	1	0	1	.250	0
Jim McAnany, RF	67	210	22	58	9	3	0	27	19	26	.276	2
Don Mueller, PH	4	4	0	2	0	0	0	0	0	0	.500	0
Bubba Phillips, 3B, OF	117	379	43	100	27	1	5	40	27	28	.264	1
Jim Rivera, RF, LF	80	177	18	39	9	4	4	19	11	19	.220	5
John Romano, C	53	126	20	37	5	1	5	25	23	18	.294	0
Harry Simpson, RF	38	75	5	14	5	1	2	13	4	14	.187	0
Lou Skizas, LF	8	13	3	1	0	0	0	0	3	2	.077	0
Al Smith, LF, RF	129	472	65	112	16	4	17	55	46	74	.237	7
Earl Torgeson, 1B	127	277	40	61	5	3	9	45	62	55	.220	7

Player	G	AB	R	H	2B	3B	HR	RBI	BB	SO	AVG	SB
Rudy Árias, P	34	4	0	0	0	0	0	0	0	2	.000	0
Dick Donovan, P	31	61	4	8	4	0	1	5	5	32	.131	0
Barry Latman, P	37	47	3	6	1	0	0	6	4	4	.128	0
Turk Lown, P	60	12	1	3	0	0	0	0	1	3	.250	0
Ken McBride, P	11	6	0	1	0	0	0	0	0	2	.167	0
Ray Moore, P	29	23	0	2	1	0	0	0	1	11	.087	0
Billy Pierce, P	34	68	3	13	1	2	0	7	7	13	.191	0
Bob Shaw, P	47	73	7	9	1	0	0	2	5	19	.123	0
Gerry Staley, P	67	13	2	2	0	0	0	0	3	5	.154	0
Joe Stanka, P	2	3	1	1	0	0	0	1	0	1	.333	0
Early Wynn, P	37	90	11	22	7	0	2	8	9	18	.244	0
Team totals	156	5297	669	1325	220	46	97	620	580	634	.250	113

=== Pitching ===
Note: W = Wins; L = Losses; ERA = Earned run average; G = Games pitched; GS = Games started; SV = Saves; IP = Innings pitched; H = Hits allowed; R = Runs allowed; ER = Earned runs allowed; HR = Home runs allowed; BB = Walks allowed; K = Strikeouts

Player	W	L	ERA	G	GS	SV	IP	H	R	ER	HR	BB	K
Rudy Árias	2	0	4.09	34	0	2	44.0	49	23	20	7	27	28
Dick Donovan	9	10	3.66	31	29	0	179.2	171	84	73	15	61	71
Barry Latman	8	5	3.75	37	21	0	156.0	138	71	65	15	75	97
Turk Lown	9	2	2.89	60	0	15	93.1	73	32	30	12	46	63
Ken McBride	0	1	3.18	11	2	1	22.2	20	11	8	1	17	12
Ray Moore	3	6	4.12	29	8	0	89.2	86	46	41	10	49	50
Gary Peters	0	0	0.00	2	0	0	1.0	2	0	0	0	2	1
Billy Pierce	14	15	3.62	34	33	0	224.0	217	98	90	26	66	114
Claude Raymond	0	0	9.00	3	0	0	4.0	5	4	4	2	2	1
Don Rudolph	0	0	0.00	4	0	1	3.0	4	0	0	0	3	0
Bob Shaw	18	6	2.69	47	26	3	230.2	217	72	69	15	59	89
Gerry Staley	8	5	2.24	67	0	14	116.1	111	39	29	5	34	54
Joe Stanka	1	0	3.38	2	0	0	5.1	2	2	2	1	5	3
Early Wynn	22	10	3.17	37	37	0	255.2	202	106	90	20	124	179
Team totals	94	60	3.29	156	156	36	1425.1	1297	588	521	129	570	761

== 1959 World Series ==
NL Los Angeles Dodgers (4) vs. AL Chicago White Sox (2)

Game	Score	Date	Location	Attendance
1	Dodgers – 0, White Sox – 11	October 1	Comiskey Park	48,013
2	Dodgers – 4, White Sox – 3	October 2	Comiskey Park	47,368
3	White Sox – 1, Dodgers – 3	October 4	Los Angeles Memorial Coliseum	92,394
4	White Sox – 4, Dodgers – 5	October 5	Los Angeles Memorial Coliseum	92,650
5	White Sox – 1, Dodgers – 0	October 6	Los Angeles Memorial Coliseum	92,706
6	Dodgers – 9, White Sox – 3	October 8	Comiskey Park	47,653

== Awards and honors ==
- Nellie Fox, American League MVP. Luis Aparicio, second place in MVP voting.
- Early Wynn, Cy Young Award
- Nellie Fox, Gold Glove Award
- Luis Aparicio, Gold Glove Award
- Sherm Lollar, Gold Glove Award
- Al López, Associated Press AL Manager of the Year

== Farm system ==
Level	Team	League	Manager
AAA	Indianapolis Indians	American Association	Walker Cooper
A	Charleston ChaSox	Sally League	Skeeter Scalzi
B	Lincoln Chiefs	Illinois–Indiana–Iowa League	Ira Hutchinson
C	Duluth–Superior Dukes	Northern League	George Noga
D	Clinton C-Sox	Midwest League	Johnny Hutchings
D	Holdrege White Sox	Nebraska State League	Frank Parenti
