= Ron Jackson (1950s first baseman) =

American baseball player (1933–2008)

- First baseman
- Born: October 22, 1933; Kalamazoo, Michigan, U.S.
- Died: July 6, 2008 (aged 74); Kalamazoo, Michigan, U.S.
- Batted: Right Threw: Right

MLB debut
- June 15, 1954, for the Chicago White Sox

Last MLB appearance
- May 15, 1960, for the Boston Red Sox

MLB statistics
- Batting average: .245
- Home runs: 17
- Runs batted in: 52
- Stats at Baseball Reference

Teams
- Chicago White Sox (1954–1959); Boston Red Sox (1960)

Ronald Harris Jackson (October 22, 1933 – July 6, 2008) was an American professional baseball player and backup first baseman in Major League Baseball who appeared in 196 games over all or part of seven years (1954–1960) for the Chicago White Sox and Boston Red Sox. Listed as 6 feet 7 inches (2.01 m) tall and 225 pounds (102 kg), he batted and threw right-handed. The native of Kalamazoo, Michigan, was an alumnus of Western Michigan University.

On June 15, 1954, amateur free agent Jackson signed a bonus contract with the White Sox that compelled him to remain on the major-league roster for two full seasons. He appeared in 80 total games in 1954–1955, 45 of them as the starting first baseman, and hit six home runs. But he batted only a cumulative .214, and in 1956, his first year of eligibility to play in the minor leagues, he got into 82 games for the top-level Vancouver Mounties and hit .304. Then, the following season, he was selected the All-Star first baseman of the Triple-A American Association on the strength of his solid offensive season. He had short stints—22 and 13 games—with the ChiSox during 1956 and 1957.

Jackson saw his most sustained MLB action in 1958. Remaining on the White Sox' roster all year, he appeared in 61 games and started 35 at first base, but he batted only .233 with seven home runs. Then, in 1959, he got into only ten games for the eventual American League champions, and spent most of the year at Triple-A. After leading the American Association in home runs (30) and runs batted in (99), he attracted the attention of the second-division Red Sox, who were seeking right-handed power to take advantage of Fenway Park's cozy left field dimensions.

But, in 1960, playing behind left-handed-swinging veteran Vic Wertz, Jackson appeared in only ten early-season games, with two extra-base hits, both doubles. At the cutdown date, May 17, Boston traded him to the Milwaukee Braves for veteran Ray Boone, who had been part of the first-base platoon in Chicago in 1958. The Braves assigned Jackson to the American Association, and he never again played in the majors, retiring after the 1961 campaign.

In his seven-season MLB career, Jackson was a .245 hitter (116–for–474) with 17 home runs and 52 RBI, including 54 runs, 18 doubles, one triple, and six stolen bases.

In 148 games at first base, he recorded 1,054 outs and 56 assists while committing nine errors for a .992 fielding percentage.

Ron Jackson owned and operated his own insurance company in Kalamazoo after retiring from baseball. He died at age 74 in his native city on July 6, 2008.

== Transactions ==
- 1954, Signed by the Chicago White Sox out of the Western Michigan University (bonus baby).
- 1959, Traded by Chicago to the Boston Red Sox in exchange for Frank Baumann.
- 1960, Traded by Boston to the Milwaukee Braves in exchange for Ray Boone (Jackson did not play for them).
