= Don Dillard =

American baseball player (1937–2022)

- Outfielder
- Born: January 8, 1937; Greenville, South Carolina, U.S.
- Died: January 8, 2022 (aged 85); Greenwood, South Carolina, U.S.
- Batted: Left Threw: Right

MLB debut
- April 24, 1959, for the Cleveland Indians

Last MLB appearance
- September 27, 1965, for the Milwaukee Braves

MLB statistics
- Batting average: .244
- Home runs: 14
- Runs batted in: 47
- Stats at Baseball Reference

Teams
- Cleveland Indians (1959–1962); Milwaukee Braves (1963, 1965)

David Donald Dillard (January 8, 1937 – January 8, 2022) was an American professional baseball player. The outfielder appeared in six Major League seasons and 272 total games played for the Cleveland Indians (1959–62) and Milwaukee Braves (1963; 1965). He batted left-handed, threw right-handed, stood 6 feet 1 inch (1.85 m) tall and weighed 200 pounds (91 kg).

== Biography ==
Dillard's pro career lasted 13 seasons, beginning in 1955 in the Cleveland farm system. He made the Indians' 1959 roster coming out of spring training, but had only six at bats as a pinch hitter during the season's early weeks before returning to the minor leagues, where he batted .283 in the Pacific Coast League. He added four more pinch hitting appearances that September, and ended his first big-league campaign as a .400 batter, with four singles and an RBI in ten at bats. The 1960 season was much the same; he had eight plate appearances and seven at bats with the Indians, and played the bulk of the year for the Triple-A Toronto Maple Leafs, batting .294.

Then followed three full seasons in the Majors as a reserve outfielder. In 1961, appearing in 74 games for Cleveland, he reached MLB highs in home runs (seven), RBI (17), and batting average (.272). The following year, 1962, saw an increase in playing time, with 94 games played, including 50 in the outfield with 29 starting assignments, and 27 more at bats. But his average (.230) declined, as did his on-base percentage and slugging percentage, and during the inter-league trading period following the season, he was packaged in a multi-player trade with the Braves in which the Indians received veteran first baseman Joe Adcock.

His 1963 season with the Braves saw Dillard make 67 appearances as a pinch hitter and left fielder, playing behind regular Lee Maye, with a batting average of .235 with one home run.

In 1964, he returned to the minor leagues and, apart from another 20-game trial with Milwaukee in 1965, he spent much of the rest of his career at the Triple-A level, retiring in 1967.

As a major leaguer, Dillard collected 116 total hits, with 16 doubles and five triples accompanying his 14 home runs. He finished his big league tenure with 47 runs batted in.

He died on January 8, 2022, his 85th birthday.
