= 1959 Detroit Tigers season =

Major League Baseball season

1959 Detroit Tigers
- League: American League
- Ballpark: Briggs Stadium
- City: Detroit, Michigan
- Record: 76–78 (.494)
- League place: 4th
- Owners: Fred Knorr, John Fetzer
- General managers: Rick Ferrell, Bill DeWitt
- Managers: Bill Norman, Jimmy Dykes
- Television: WJBK
- Radio: WKMH (Van Patrick, George Kell)

The 1959 Detroit Tigers season was the 59th season for the American League franchise in Detroit. Although the Tigers lost 15 of their first 17 games in 1959—resulting in the May 2 firing of manager Bill Norman—they recovered under his successor, Jimmy Dykes, to finish in fourth place with a record of 76–78, eighteen games behind the AL Champion Chicago White Sox.

== Offseason ==
- October 13, 1958: Maury Wills was sent to the Tigers by the Los Angeles Dodgers as part of a conditional deal.
- November 20, 1958: Billy Martin and Al Cicotte were traded by the Tigers to the Cleveland Indians for Don Mossi, Ray Narleski, and Ossie Álvarez.
- December 1, 1958: Lou Skizas was drafted from the Tigers by the Chicago White Sox in the 1958 rule 5 draft.
- Prior to 1959 season: Andy Kosco was signed as an amateur free agent by the Tigers.

== Regular season ==
=== Season standings ===
American League
Team	W	L	Pct.	GB	Home	Road
Chicago White Sox	94	60	.610	—	47‍–‍30	47‍–‍30
Cleveland Indians	89	65	.578	5	43‍–‍34	46‍–‍31
New York Yankees	79	75	.513	15	40‍–‍37	39‍–‍38
Detroit Tigers	76	78	.494	18	41‍–‍36	35‍–‍42
Boston Red Sox	75	79	.487	19	43‍–‍34	32‍–‍45
Baltimore Orioles	74	80	.481	20	38‍–‍39	36‍–‍41
Kansas City Athletics	66	88	.429	28	37‍–‍40	29‍–‍48
Washington Senators	63	91	.409	31	34‍–‍43	29‍–‍48

=== Record vs. opponents ===
1959 American League record Sources:
Team	BAL	BOS	CWS	CLE	DET	KCA	NYY	WSH
Baltimore	—	8–14	11–11–1	10–12	13–9	8–14	12–10	12–10
Boston	14–8	—	8–14	8–14	11–11	11–11	13–9	10–12
Chicago	11–11–1	14–8	—	15–7	13–9	12–10	13–9–1	16–6
Cleveland	12–10	14–8	7–15	—	14–8	15–7	11–11	16–6
Detroit	9–13	11–11	9–13	8–14	—	15–7	14–8	10–12
Kansas City	14–8	11–11	10–12	7–15	7–15	—	5–17	12–10
New York	10–12	9–13	9–13–1	11–11	8–14	17–5	—	15–7
Washington	10–12	12–10	6–16	6–16	12–10	10–12	7–15	—

=== Notable transactions ===
- March 21, 1959: Future Hall of Famer Larry Doby, who integrated the American League in 1947 with the Cleveland Indians, is acquired by the Tigers from Cleveland for outfielder Tito Francona. On April 10, Opening Day, left-fielder Doby becomes the second Black player (after Ozzie Virgil Sr.) and first African-American to appear in a Detroit uniform.
- April 2, 1959: Maury Wills was returned by the Tigers to the Los Angeles Dodgers as part of a conditional deal.
- May 13, 1959: Larry Doby's contract is sold to the Chicago White Sox. The 35-year-old Doby batted only .218 with no home runs in 55 at-bats with the Tigers and he will end his playing career in U.S. pro baseball later in 1959.
- June 13, 1959: Bob Smith was selected off waivers by the Tigers from the Pittsburgh Pirates.

=== Roster ===
1959 Detroit Tigers
Roster
Pitchers: 30 Hank Aguirre; 20 Bob Bruce; 14 Jim Bunning; 19 Pete Burnside; 27 Jerry Davie; 21 Paul Foytack; 44 Billy Hoeft; 17 Frank Lary; 18 Tom Morgan; 15 Don Mossi; 16 Ray Narleski; 37 Jim Proctor; 20 Barney Schultz; 30 Dave Sisler; 26 Bob Smith; 26 Jim Stump; 26 George Susce	Catchers: 11 Lou Berberet; 12 Charley Lau; 25 Ron Shoop; 10 Red Wilson; Infielders: 2 Frank Bolling; 8 Rocky Bridges; 26 Steve Demeter; 5 Gail Harris; 22 Ted Lepcio; 32 Bobo Osborne; 23 Coot Veal; 1 Eddie Yost; 9 Gus Zernial	Outfielders: 24 Neil Chrisley; 25 Larry Doby; 3 Johnny Groth; 6 Al Kaline; 7 Harvey Kuenn; 4 Charlie Maxwell; Other batters: 36 Ossie Álvarez	Manager: 28 Jimmy Dykes; 29 Bill Norman; Coaches: 31 Tommy Henrich; 34 Billy Hitchcock; 33 Willis Hudlin

== Player stats ==
= Indicates team leader

= Indicates league leader

=== Batting ===
==== Starters by position ====
Note: Pos = Position; G = Games played; AB = At bats; H = Hits; Avg. = Batting average; HR = Home runs; RBI = Runs batted in

Pos	Player	G	AB	H	Avg.	HR	RBI
C	Lou Berberet	100	338	73	.216	13	44
1B	Gail Harris	114	349	77	.221	9	39
2B	Frank Bolling	127	459	122	.266	13	55
SS	Rocky Bridges	116	381	102	.268	3	35
3B	Eddie Yost	148	521	145	.278	21	60
LF	Charlie Maxwell	145	518	130	.251	31	95
CF	Al Kaline	136	511	167	.327	27	94
RF	Harvey Kuenn	139	561	198	.353	9	71

==== Other batters ====
Note: G = Games played; AB = At bats; H = Hits; Avg. = Batting average; HR = Home runs; RBI = Runs batted in

Player	G	AB	H	Avg.	HR	RBI
Red Wilson	67	228	60	.263	4	35
Ted Lepcio	76	215	60	.279	7	24
Bobo Osborne	86	209	40	.191	3	21
Gus Zernial	60	132	30	.227	7	26
Neil Chrisley	65	106	14	.132	6	11
Johnny Groth	55	102	24	.235	1	10
Coot Veal	77	89	18	.202	1	15
Larry Doby	18	55	12	.218	0	4
Steve Demeter	11	18	2	.111	0	1
Ron Shoop	3	7	1	.143	0	1
Charley Lau	2	6	1	.167	0	0
Ossie Álvarez	8	2	1	.500	0	0

=== Pitching ===
==== Starting pitchers ====
Note: G = Games pitched; IP = Innings pitched; W = Wins; L = Losses; ERA = Earned run average; SO = Strikeouts

Player	G	IP	W	L	ERA	SO
Jim Bunning	40	249.2	17	13	3.89	201
Paul Foytack	39	240.1	14	14	4.64	110
Don Mossi	34	228.0	17	9	3.36	125
Frank Lary	32	223.0	17	10	3.55	137
Billy Hoeft	2	9.0	1	1	5.00	2

==== Other pitchers ====
Note: G = Games pitched; IP = Innings pitched; W = Wins; L = Losses; ERA = Earned run average; SO = Strikeouts

Player	G	IP	W	L	ERA	SO
Ray Narleski	42	104.1	4	12	5.78	71
Jerry Davie	11	36.2	2	2	4.17	20
Jim Proctor	2	2.2	0	1	16.88	0
Bob Bruce	2	2.0	0	1	9.00	1

==== Relief pitchers ====
Note: G = Games pitched; W = Wins; L = Losses; SV = Saves; ERA = Earned run average; SO = Strikeouts

Player	G	W	L	SV	ERA	SO
Tom Morgan	46	1	4	9	3.98	39
Dave Sisler	32	1	3	7	4.01	29
Pete Burnside	30	1	3	1	3.77	49
Barney Schultz	13	1	2	0	4.42	17
George Susce	9	0	0	0	12.89	9
Bob Smith	9	0	0	0	8.18	10
Jim Stump	5	0	0	0	2.38	6
Hank Aguirre	3	0	0	0	3.38	3

== Farm system ==
Level	Team	League	Manager
AAA	Charleston Senators	American Association	Bill Adair
AA	Birmingham Barons	Southern Association	Skeeter Newsome
A	Knoxville Smokies	Sally League	Johnny Pesky
B	Durham Bulls	Carolina League	Frank Skaff
D	Montgomery Rebels	Alabama–Florida League	Frank Carswell
D	Decatur Commodores	Midwest League	Stubby Overmire
D	Erie Sailors	New York–Penn League	Al Lakeman and Pat Mullin
