= Jim Bronstad =

American baseball player (1936–2022)

- Pitcher
- Born: June 22, 1936; Fort Worth, Texas, U.S.
- Died: April 9, 2022 (aged 85); Fort Worth, Texas, U.S.
- Batted: Right Threw: Right

MLB debut
- June 7, 1959, for the New York Yankees

Last MLB appearance
- October 4, 1964, for the Washington Senators

MLB statistics
- Win–loss record: 1–7
- Earned run average: 5.48
- Strikeouts: 45
- Stats at Baseball Reference

Teams
- New York Yankees (1959); Washington Senators (1963–1964)

James Warren Bronstad (June 22, 1936 – April 9, 2022) was an American professional baseball pitcher who appeared in 45 games in Major League Baseball (MLB) for the New York Yankees (1959) and Washington Senators (1963–1964). Born in Fort Worth, Texas, he attended R. L. Paschal High School. Bronstad threw and batted right-handed, stood 6 feet 3 inches (1.91 m) tall and weighed 196 pounds (89 kg) during his ten-season active career.

After signing with the Yankees in 1955, he moved up through the farm system of the Bronx Bombers until his recall in mid-1959, the least successful season of Casey Stengel's 12-year run as the club's manager. After three effective relief appearances in Bronstad's MLB debut, Stengel gave him his first big-league start on June 12, 1959, against the Detroit Tigers. He allowed six hits and three earned runs through seven full innings pitched, but the Yankee hitters couldn't solve Detroit left-hander Don Mossi, and Bronstad took the 3–1 defeat. In two other starts, Bronstad gained a no-decision June 18 against the eventual American League champion Chicago White Sox, but absorbed his second loss six days later against the second-division Kansas City Athletics, despite again allowing only three earned runs, this time over six innings. Returning to the bullpen, Bronstad kept his earned run average below 3.00 through July 4, but a series of rough outings later that month inflated his ERA to 5.22; his last appearance as a Yankee came on July 25, 1959. The three starts he made that season were his only starting pitcher assignments as a major leaguer.

Bronstad remained in the New York organization through spring training of 1963, when his contract was sold to the Senators. He pitched out of the Washington bullpen for the season's first three months, and although he struggled on the mound, he was able to post his only MLB victory on May 2, 1963, against the Tigers. Relieving Claude Osteen in the fifth inning with the Senators leading 3–2, he held off a Tigers threat and remained on the mound for the final out of Washington's 9–4 victory. However, Bronstad again posted ERAs of over 5.00 during each of his partial seasons with the Senators. In his 45 big-league games, 16 with the Yankees and 29 with the Senators, he had a 1–7 won–lost record with a career 5.48 ERA, with three saves earned as a reliever. In 932/3 innings pitched, he allowed 110 hits and 37 bases on balls. He also had 45 strikeouts. He retired after the 1964 season.

Bronstad died April 9, 2022, in Fort Worth, Texas.
