= Zach Monroe =

American baseball player (1931–2026)

- Pitcher
- Born: July 8, 1931; Peoria, Illinois, U.S.
- Died: January 18, 2026 (aged 94); Peoria, Illinois, U.S.
- Batted: Right Threw: Right

MLB debut
- June 27, 1958, for the New York Yankees

Last MLB appearance
- May 3, 1959, for the New York Yankees

MLB statistics
- Win–loss record: 4–2
- Earned run average: 3.38
- Strikeouts: 19
- Stats at Baseball Reference

Teams
- New York Yankees (1958–1959)

Career highlights and awards
- World Series champion (1958)

Zachary Charles Monroe (July 8, 1931 – January 18, 2026) was an American professional baseball pitcher who appeared in parts of two seasons in Major League Baseball (1958–1959) with the New York Yankees, and was a member of their 1958 World Series champions. The native of Peoria, Illinois, was an alumnus of Bradley University. He was listed as 6 feet (1.8 m) tall and 198 pounds (90 kg), and threw and batted right-handed.

== Biography ==
Monroe's career began in 1952 and, interrupted by military service, lasted for nine seasons over 11 years. In June 1958, after he posted a 10–2 record for the Triple-A Denver Bears, he was called up to the Yankees and debuted on the 27th with 31/3 hitless innings of relief against the Kansas City Athletics. He went on to work 20 more games for the 1958 Bombers, making six starts and registering a complete game victory on September 2 against the Boston Red Sox at Yankee Stadium. In the 1958 World Series that followed, Monroe appeared in Game 2 in a "mop-up" assignment; coming into the contest in the home half of the eighth inning with the Milwaukee Braves already ahead 10–2, he allowed three runs and three hits. Milwaukee went on to win 13–5 to take a two games to none led in the Series, but the Yankees battled back to win four of the next five contests and their 18th world title.

He made the 1959 Yankees' 28-man roster coming out of spring training, but hurled in only three games, all in relief, and was sent to Triple-A at the May cutdown. He did not get another opportunity to pitch in the majors, remaining in the minor leagues through 1962. During his MLB career, Monroe compiled a 4–2 record with one save, one complete game, a 3.38 earned run average, and 19 strikeouts in 24 appearances; in 611/3 innings pitched, he permitted 60 hits and 29 bases on balls.

Monroe died in Peoria, Illinois, on January 18, 2026, at the age of 94.
