= 1959 Baltimore Orioles season =

Major League Baseball season

1959 Baltimore Orioles
- League: American League
- Ballpark: Memorial Stadium
- City: Baltimore
- Record: 74–80 (.481)
- League place: 6th
- Owners: Jerold Hoffberger, Joseph Iglehart
- General managers: Lee MacPhail
- Managers: Paul Richards
- Television: WJZ-TV
- Radio: WBAL (AM) (Ernie Harwell, Herb Carneal)

The 1959 Baltimore Orioles season was the franchise's sixth season in Baltimore, Maryland, and its 59th overall. It resulted with the Orioles finishing sixth in the American League with a record of 74 wins and 80 losses, 22 games behind the AL champion Chicago White Sox.

== Offseason ==
- October 2, 1958: Dick Williams was traded by the Orioles to the Kansas City Athletics for Chico Carrasquel.
- Prior to 1959 season (exact date unknown)
  - John Anderson was obtained by the Orioles from the Miami Marlins after expiration of minor league working agreement.
  - Bob Saverine was signed as an amateur free agent by the Orioles.

== Regular season ==
- June 10, 1959: Rocky Colavito of the Cleveland Indians hit four home runs in one game against the Orioles.

=== Season standings ===
American League
Team	W	L	Pct.	GB	Home	Road
Chicago White Sox	94	60	.610	—	47‍–‍30	47‍–‍30
Cleveland Indians	89	65	.578	5	43‍–‍34	46‍–‍31
New York Yankees	79	75	.513	15	40‍–‍37	39‍–‍38
Detroit Tigers	76	78	.494	18	41‍–‍36	35‍–‍42
Boston Red Sox	75	79	.487	19	43‍–‍34	32‍–‍45
Baltimore Orioles	74	80	.481	20	38‍–‍39	36‍–‍41
Kansas City Athletics	66	88	.429	28	37‍–‍40	29‍–‍48
Washington Senators	63	91	.409	31	34‍–‍43	29‍–‍48

=== Record vs. opponents ===
1959 American League record Sources:
Team	BAL	BOS	CWS	CLE	DET	KCA	NYY	WSH
Baltimore	—	8–14	11–11–1	10–12	13–9	8–14	12–10	12–10
Boston	14–8	—	8–14	8–14	11–11	11–11	13–9	10–12
Chicago	11–11–1	14–8	—	15–7	13–9	12–10	13–9–1	16–6
Cleveland	12–10	14–8	7–15	—	14–8	15–7	11–11	16–6
Detroit	9–13	11–11	9–13	8–14	—	15–7	14–8	10–12
Kansas City	14–8	11–11	10–12	7–15	7–15	—	5–17	12–10
New York	10–12	9–13	9–13–1	11–11	8–14	17–5	—	15–7
Washington	10–12	12–10	6–16	6–16	12–10	10–12	7–15	—

=== Opening Day starters ===
- Bob Boyd
- Billy Gardner
- Ron Hansen
- Al Pilarcik
- Arnie Portocarrero
- Brooks Robinson
- Willie Tasby
- Gus Triandos
- Gene Woodling

=== Notable transactions ===
- April 1, 1959: Vito Valentinetti was acquired by the Orioles from the Washington Senators in exchange for Billy Loes. The trade was voided and the players returned to their original teams on April 8.
- May 21, 1959: Bobby Ávila was acquired by the Boston Red Sox from the Orioles off waivers.
- May 26, 1959: Albie Pearson was acquired by the Orioles from the Washington Senators in exchange for Lenny Green.
- June 15, 1959: Billy Hoeft was acquired by the Orioles from the Boston Red Sox in exchange for Jack Harshman.
- June 23, 1959: Whitey Lockman was traded by the Orioles to the Cincinnati Redlegs for Walt Dropo.
- September 6, 1959: Rip Coleman was acquired by the Orioles off waivers from the Kansas City Athletics.

=== Roster ===
1959 Baltimore Orioles
Roster
Pitchers: 16 George Bamberger; 28 Hal Brown; 35 Rip Coleman; 48 Jack Fisher; 29 Jack Harshman; 29 Billy Hoeft; 46 Ernie Johnson; 18 Billy Loes; 41 Billy O'Dell; 32 Milt Pappas; 24 Arnie Portocarrero; 27 Wes Stock; 38 Jerry Walker; 15 Hoyt Wilhelm; 35 George Zuverink	Catchers: 22 Joe Ginsberg; 11 Gus Triandos; Infielders: 8 Jerry Adair; 1 Bob Boyd; 23 Leo Burke; 17 Chico Carrasquel; 37 Walt Dropo; 33 Jim Finigan; 9 Billy Gardner; 10 Bob Hale; 3 Ron Hansen; 6 Billy Klaus; 25 Whitey Lockman; 7 Willy Miranda; 5 Brooks Robinson	Outfielders: 8 Bobby Ávila; 21 Lenny Green; 4 Bob Nieman; 21 Albie Pearson; 2 Al Pilarcik; 40 Barry Shetrone; 44 Willie Tasby; 27 Joe Taylor; 27 Fred Valentine; 14 Gene Woodling; Other batters: 33 Bob Saverine	Manager: 12 Paul Richards; Coaches: 45 Jimmy Adair; 31 Harry Brecheen; 26 Lum Harris; 30 Al Vincent

== Player stats ==
=== Batting ===
==== Starters by position ====
Note: Pos = Position; G = Games played; AB = At bats; H = Hits; Avg. = Batting average; HR = Home runs; RBI = Runs batted in

Pos	Player	G	AB	H	Avg.	HR	RBI
C	Gus Triandos	126	393	85	.216	25	73
1B	Bob Boyd	128	415	110	.265	3	41
2B	Billy Gardner	140	401	87	.217	6	27
3B	Brooks Robinson	88	313	89	.284	4	24
SS	Chico Carrasquel	114	346	77	.223	4	28
LF	Bob Nieman	118	360	105	.292	21	60
CF	Willie Tasby	142	505	126	.250	13	48
RF	Al Pilarcik	130	273	77	.282	3	16

==== Other batters ====
Note: G = Games played; AB = At bats; H = Hits; Avg. = Batting average; HR = Home runs; RBI = Runs batted in

Player	G	AB	H	Avg.	HR	RBI
Gene Woodling	140	440	132	.300	14	77
Billy Klaus	104	321	80	.249	3	25
Joe Ginsberg	65	166	30	.181	1	14
Walt Dropo	62	151	42	.278	6	21
Albie Pearson	80	138	32	.232	0	6
Jim Finigan	48	119	30	.252	1	10
Willy Miranda	65	88	14	.159	0	7
Barry Shetrone	33	79	16	.203	0	5
Whitey Lockman	38	69	15	.217	0	2
Bob Hale	40	54	10	.185	0	7
Bobby Ávila	20	47	8	.170	0	0
Jerry Adair	12	35	11	.314	0	2
Joe Taylor	14	32	5	.156	1	2
Lenny Green	27	24	7	.292	2	15
Fred Valentine	12	19	6	.316	0	1
Leo Burke	5	10	2	.200	0	1
Ron Hansen	2	4	0	.000	0	0
Bob Saverine	1	0	0	----	0	0

=== Pitching ===
==== Starting pitchers ====
Note: G = Games pitched; IP = Innings pitched; W = Wins; L = Losses; ERA = Earned run average; SO = Strikeouts

Player	G	IP	W	L	ERA	SO
Hoyt Wilhelm	32	226.0	15	11	2.19	139
Milt Pappas	33	209.1	15	9	3.27	120
Jerry Walker	30	182.0	11	10	2.92	100
Hal Brown	31	164.0	11	9	3.79	81

==== Other pitchers ====
Note: G = Games pitched; IP = Innings pitched; W = Wins; L = Losses; ERA = Earned run average; SO = Strikeouts

Player	G	IP	W	L	ERA	SO
Billy O'Dell	38	199.1	10	12	2.93	88
Arnie Portocarrero	27	90.0	2	7	6.80	23
Jack Fisher	27	88.2	1	6	3.05	52
Jack Harshman	14	47.1	0	6	6.85	24
George Bamberger	3	8.1	0	0	7.56	2

==== Relief pitchers ====
Note: G = Games pitched; W = Wins; L = Losses; SV = Saves; ERA = Earned run average; SO = Strikeouts

Player	G	W	L	SV	ERA	SO
Billy Loes	37	4	7	14	4.06	34
Ernie Johnson	31	4	1	1	4.11	29
Billy Hoeft	16	1	1	0	5.71	30
Wes Stock	7	0	0	1	3.55	8
George Zuverink	6	0	1	0	4.15	1
Rip Coleman	3	0	0	0	0.00	4

== Farm system ==
Level	Team	League	Manager
AAA	Miami Marlins	International League	Pepper Martin
AAA	Vancouver Mounties	Pacific Coast League	Charlie Metro
AA	Amarillo Gold Sox	Texas League	Barney Lutz and George Staller
C	Stockton Ports	California League	Billy DeMars
C	Aberdeen Pheasants	Northern League	Earl Weaver
D	Pensacola Dons	Alabama–Florida League	Lou Fitzgerald
D	Bluefield Orioles	Appalachian League	Bob Hooper
