= Ray Webster (second baseman) =

American baseball player (1937–2020)

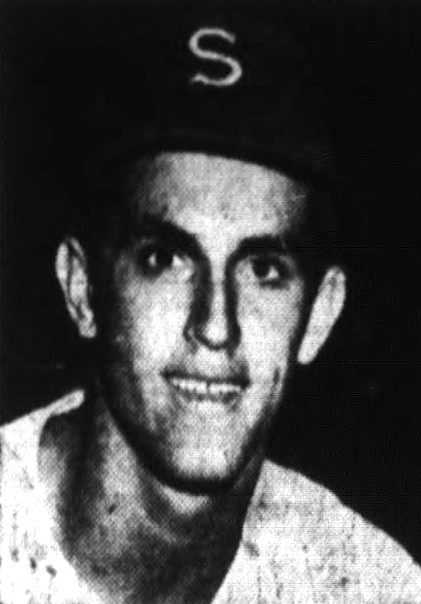
- Webster, circa 1956
- Second baseman
- Born: September 15, 1937; Grass Valley, California, U.S.
- Died: June 3, 2020 (aged 82); Browns Valley, California, U.S.
- Batted: Right Threw: Right

MLB debut
- April 17, 1959, for the Cleveland Indians

Last MLB appearance
- May 15, 1960, for the Boston Red Sox

MLB statistics
- Batting average: .195
- Home runs: 2
- Runs batted in: 11
- Stats at Baseball Reference

Teams
- Cleveland Indians (1959); Boston Red Sox (1960)

Raymond George Webster (November 15, 1937 – June 3, 2020) was an American backup second baseman in Major League Baseball who played in part of two seasons for the Cleveland Indians (1959) and Boston Red Sox (1960). Listed at 6' 0", 175 lb., he batted and threw right-handed. In a two-season career, Webster had a .195 batting average (15-for-77) with two home runs and 11 runs batted in in 47 games.

Webster began his professional career with the Salem Senators, who he played for from 1955 to 1956. The following season he played for the Amarillo Gold Sox, and had a .284 batting average and 19 home runs in 154 games. In 1958, Webster played for the Sacramento Solons of the Pacific Coast League, and ended the year with a .244 batting average and 10 home runs. After finishing the season, Cleveland Indians manager Joe Gordon recommended that they acquire him for their major league roster, and as a result they selected Webster in the rule 5 draft.

During the 1959 offseason, Webster worked as a surveyor for the Yuma County, Arizona Public Works Department before Indians spring training began. After spring training ended, he made the major league roster as the backup to Billy Martin, though Gordon felt Webster had the superior exhibition season. He played in 40 games for the Indians in 1959, and had a .203 batting average. In January 1960, the Indians traded Webster to the Boston Red Sox for Leo Kiely. He played in seven games early in the season, but was sent to the minors after May 15.

Webster finished 1960 with the Montreal Royals and Indianapolis Indians. He spent the next two seasons with the Vancouver Mounties and Hawaii Islanders, then ended his career with the Charlotte Hornets, hitting .225 in 104 games.

Webster died of liver cancer on June 3, 2020, at Browns Valley, California.
