= Evans Killeen =

American baseball player (born 1936)

- Pitcher
- Born: February 27, 1936 (age 89); Brooklyn, New York, U.S.
- Batted: Right Threw: Right

MLB debut
- September 7, 1959, for the Kansas City Athletics

Last MLB appearance
- September 25, 1959, for the Kansas City Athletics

MLB statistics
- Win–loss record: 0–0
- Earned run average: 4.76
- Innings: 5 2/3
- Stats at Baseball Reference

Teams
- Kansas City Athletics (1959)

Evans Henry Killeen (born February 27, 1936) is an American former professional baseball player. A right-handed pitcher, he worked in four Major League games, all in relief, for the Kansas City Athletics late in the 1959 season. The Brooklyn, New York, native was listed at 6 feet (1.8 m) tall and 190 pounds (86 kg).

Killeen was recalled from the Class A Albany Senators of the Eastern League in September 1959. In his four MLB relief appearances, he allowed four hits, four bases on balls, and three earned runs, with one strikeout, in 5 2/3 innings pitched.

Killeen appeared in minor league baseball from 1955 to 1962. In 184 minor league games, he won 55 and lost 61.
