= Lou Skizas =

American baseball player (1932–2023)

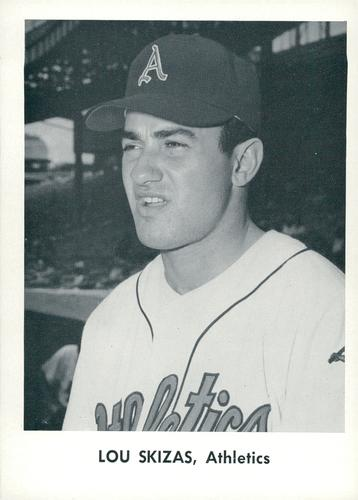
- Outfielder
- Born: June 2, 1932; Chicago, Illinois, U.S.
- Died: November 17, 2023 (aged 91); Savoy, Illinois, U.S.
- Batted: Right Threw: Right

MLB debut
- April 19, 1956, for the New York Yankees

Last MLB appearance
- April 30, 1959, for the Chicago White Sox

MLB statistics
- Batting average: .270
- Home runs: 30
- Runs batted in: 86
- Stats at Baseball Reference

Teams
- New York Yankees (1956); Kansas City Athletics (1956–1957); Detroit Tigers (1958); Chicago White Sox (1959)

Louis Peter Skizas (June 2, 1932 – November 17, 2023) was an American professional baseball outfielder and third baseman in Major League Baseball from 1956 through 1959 for the New York Yankees, Kansas City Athletics, Detroit Tigers and Chicago White Sox. He was born in Chicago, Illinois. Skizas batted and threw right-handed.

Skizas was a volunteer hitting coach for the University of Illinois Urbana-Champaign from 1980 to 1984.

== Life and career ==
Skizas attended Crane High School in Chicago and was signed by the New York Yankees when he was 17. He made his Major League debut with the Yankees in a road game that the Yankees lost 7–3 to the Washington Senators on April 19, 1956.

Pinch-hitting in the fifth inning for pitcher Mickey McDermott, after leadoff hits by Elston Howard and Andy Carey put runners on second and third, Skizas singled to right field for the Yankees' first run of the game.

Skizas would get only six at-bats for New York. He was traded on June 14 of that season with teammate Eddie Robinson to the Kansas City Athletics for two players and cash. For the remainder of that season, Skizas appeared in 83 games for Kansas City and batted .316 with 11 home runs. He was a contact hitter who struck out just 17 times in 297 at-bats that season for the A's.

A 12-man trade between Kansas City and the Detroit Tigers was made on November 20, 1957, in which Skizas went to Detroit along with teammates Billy Martin, Gus Zernial and the man he pinch-hit for in his first MLB at-bat, McDermott. In 1959, his last season in the majors, Skizas appeared in eight games for the Chicago White Sox, but did not play for them in the 1959 World Series.

After retiring from the Major Leagues he played minor league baseball in Central America and later was a Health Sciences teacher and Baseball Coach at Champaign Centennial High School in Champaign, Illinois.

Skizas died in Savoy, Illinois, on November 17, 2023, at the age of 92.
