= John Briggs (baseball) =

American baseball player (1934–2018)

- Pitcher
- Born: January 24, 1934; Natoma, California, U.S.
- Died: December 25, 2018 (aged 84); Big Trees, California, U.S.
- Batted: Right Threw: Right

MLB debut
- April 17, 1956, for the Chicago Cubs

Last MLB appearance
- September 4, 1960, for the Kansas City Athletics

MLB statistics
- Win–loss record: 9–11
- Earned run average: 5.00
- Strikeouts: 80
- Stats at Baseball Reference

Teams
- Chicago Cubs (1956–1958); Cleveland Indians (1959–1960); Kansas City Athletics (1960)

Jonathan Tift Briggs (January 24, 1934 – December 25, 2018) was an American professional baseball pitcher who played in Major League Baseball for all or parts of five seasons for the Chicago Cubs (1956–58), Cleveland Indians (1959–60), and Kansas City Athletics (1960). Born in Natoma, a district of Folsom, California, the right-hander was listed as 5 feet 10 inches (1.78 m) tall and 175 pounds (79 kg).

Briggs initially signed with his hometown team, the Sacramento Solons of the Open-Classification Pacific Coast League, in 1952. In 1954, he led the Class A Western International League in strikeouts (233) and earned run average (2.50) and won 20 of 28 decisions as a member of the Salem Senators. After two three-game trials with the Cubs in 1956 and 1957, he rejoined the Cubs in the midst of the 1958 campaign and took a spot in their starting rotation. He split ten decisions in 20 games pitched (with 17 starts) and put up an ERA of 4.52. He threw what would be his only MLB shutout on June 24, scattering eight hits and four bases on balls to defeat the Philadelphia Phillies, 3–0.

In January 1959 Briggs was sent to the Indians in a waiver deal that also featured outfielder Jim Bolger, pitcher Morrie Martin and utilityman Earl Averill, Jr. Although he pitched effectively in three spring appearances for Cleveland, Briggs spent most of the 1959 season in Triple-A with the San Diego Padres, where he went 14–6 (2.60).

That led to Briggs's only full season of Major League experience, 1960. He worked in 21 games for the Indians, all but two of them as a relief pitcher, and compiled a 4–2 mark with one save. His contract then was sold to the Athletics on July 30. But Briggs treated roughly in his first five appearances for Kansas City, allowing 14 hits, seven bases on balls and 13 earned runs in seven innings pitched. During that skein, he lost his only starting assignment to the Boston Red Sox on August 4, failing to record an out and allowing a three-run, first-inning home run to veteran Vic Wertz. Briggs finished the 1960 season 4–4 with a 6.42 earned run average.

The following winter, he was traded to the Cincinnati Reds with fellow right-hander John Tsitouris for veteran southpaw pitcher Joe Nuxhall. Briggs never appeared in regular season game for Cincinnati, playing two more years of Triple-A before his 1962 retirement.

During his MLB career, Briggs appeared in 59 games and 165 2/3 innings pitched, allowing 174 hits and 82 bases on balls. He struck out 80, had three complete games and the one save he recorded in 1960.

Briggs died on December 25, 2018.
