= Bob Smith (pitcher, born 1928) =

American baseball player (1928–2003)

- Pitcher
- Born: May 13, 1928; Clarence, Missouri, U.S.
- Died: June 23, 2003 (aged 75); Clarence, Missouri, U.S.
- Batted: Left Threw: Left

MLB debut
- April 22, 1958, for the Boston Red Sox

Last MLB appearance
- September 27, 1959, for the Cleveland Indians

MLB statistics
- Win–loss record: 4–4
- Earned run average: 4.75
- Strikeouts: 60
- Stats at Baseball Reference

Teams
- Boston Red Sox (1958); Chicago Cubs (1959); Cleveland Indians (1959)

Robert Walkup Smith (May 13, 1928 – June 23, 2003), nicknamed "Riverboat", was an American professional baseball player. He was a left-handed pitcher who appeared in 30 games in the Major Leagues over parts of 1958 and 1959 for the Boston Red Sox, Chicago Cubs and Cleveland Indians. He was listed as 6 feet (1.8 m) tall and 185 pounds (84 kg), and attended the University of Missouri.

Smith fashioned a 13-season (1951–63) professional career and won 94 games in minor league baseball. He earned his nickname from San Francisco baseball writer Bob Stevens for his coolness and finesse under fire—not unlike a riverboat gambler—while he was a member of 1956–57 San Francisco Seals of the Pacific Coast League.

One-third of Smith's 30 MLB appearances came as a starting pitcher. He earned his only complete game victory as a rookie with the Red Sox on May 20, 1958, at Cleveland Stadium, throwing a three-hitter but walking nine Indians' batters in a 6–1 triumph. Smith won three other games for Boston that season, all in relief, as he posted a 4–3 mark and 3.78 earned run average in 17 games. But the Red Sox traded him to the Cubs the following spring for outfielder Chuck Tanner, and after just one ineffective outing against the Cincinnati Reds on April 29 for the 1959 Cubbies, he was dealt to the Indians for veteran third baseman and ex-Cub Randy Jackson. He worked in 12 mid- and late-season games for Cleveland, dropping his only decision. It was his last season in the majors.

Altogether, Smith compiled a 4–4 MLB win–loss record, with no saves, and a 4.75 earned run average. He gave up 97 hits and 59 bases on balls, with 60 strikeouts, in 962/3 innings pitched.

His career coincided with that of Robert Gilchrist Smith, a fellow left-handed pitcher who also came up through the Red Sox' farm system. The two were teammates in 1951, 1955 and 1956. Robert G. Smith, however, would spend 81 games of his 91-game MLB career (1955; 1957–59) in the National League.

Riverboat Smith died, aged 75, at his family farm in his hometown of Clarence, Missouri, on June 23, 2003, from injuries he sustained in a tractor accident.
