= 1959 Washington Senators season =

1959 Washington Senators
- League: American League
- Ballpark: Griffith Stadium
- City: Washington, D.C.
- Record: 63–91 (.409)
- League place: 8th
- Owners: Calvin Griffith (majority owner, with Thelma Griffith Haynes)
- General managers: Calvin Griffith
- Managers: Cookie Lavagetto
- Television: WTOP
- Radio: WTOP (Chuck Thompson, Bob Wolff, Jack Guinan)

The 1959 Washington Senators won 63 games, lost 91, and finished in eighth place in the American League, 31 games behind the AL Champion Chicago White Sox in their penultimate season in The Nation's Capital. They were managed by Cookie Lavagetto and played home games at Griffith Stadium.

== Regular season ==
On September 7, Ron Samford hit a home run in the last at bat of his career.

Pedro Ramos led the American League in losses.

=== Season standings ===
American League
Team	W	L	Pct.	GB	Home	Road
Chicago White Sox	94	60	.610	—	47‍–‍30	47‍–‍30
Cleveland Indians	89	65	.578	5	43‍–‍34	46‍–‍31
New York Yankees	79	75	.513	15	40‍–‍37	39‍–‍38
Detroit Tigers	76	78	.494	18	41‍–‍36	35‍–‍42
Boston Red Sox	75	79	.487	19	43‍–‍34	32‍–‍45
Baltimore Orioles	74	80	.481	20	38‍–‍39	36‍–‍41
Kansas City Athletics	66	88	.429	28	37‍–‍40	29‍–‍48
Washington Senators	63	91	.409	31	34‍–‍43	29‍–‍48

=== Record vs. opponents ===
1959 American League record Sources:
Team	BAL	BOS	CWS	CLE	DET	KCA	NYY	WSH
Baltimore	—	8–14	11–11–1	10–12	13–9	8–14	12–10	12–10
Boston	14–8	—	8–14	8–14	11–11	11–11	13–9	10–12
Chicago	11–11–1	14–8	—	15–7	13–9	12–10	13–9–1	16–6
Cleveland	12–10	14–8	7–15	—	14–8	15–7	11–11	16–6
Detroit	9–13	11–11	9–13	8–14	—	15–7	14–8	10–12
Kansas City	14–8	11–11	10–12	7–15	7–15	—	5–17	12–10
New York	10–12	9–13	9–13–1	11–11	8–14	17–5	—	15–7
Washington	10–12	12–10	6–16	6–16	12–10	10–12	7–15	—

=== Notable transactions ===
- April 1, 1959: Vito Valentinetti was traded by the Senators to the Baltimore Orioles for Billy Loes. The trade was voided and the players returned to their original teams on April 8.
- July 25, 1959: Jay Porter was selected off waivers from the Senators by the St. Louis Cardinals.

=== Roster ===
1959 Washington Senators
Roster
Pitchers: 12 Tex Clevenger; 18 Bill Fischer; 24 Hal Griggs; 35 Dick Hyde; 21 Jim Kaat; 16 Russ Kemmerer; 19,37 Jack Kralick; 15 Ralph Lumenti; 25 Tom McAvoy; 17 Camilo Pascual; 28 Pedro Ramos; 34,38 John Romonosky; 27 Chuck Stobbs; 15 Vito Valentinetti; 35 Murray Wall; 19 Hal Woodeshick	Catchers: 14 Clint Courtney; 8 Ed Fitz Gerald; 10 Steve Korcheck; 8 Hal Naragon; 9 Jay Porter; Infielders: 4 Ken Aspromonte; 29 Julio Bécquer; 1 Reno Bertoia; 6,25 Billy Consolo; 3 Harmon Killebrew; 25 Herb Plews; 32 Ron Samford; 9 Johnny Schaive; 2 Roy Sievers; 36 José Valdivielso; 5,36 Zoilo Versalles; 5 Norm Zauchin	Outfielders: 26 Bob Allison; 22 Dan Dobbek; 7 Lenny Green; 23 Jim Lemon; 6 Albie Pearson; 30 Faye Throneberry; Other batters: 7 Bobby Malkmus	Manager: 51 Cookie Lavagetto; Coaches: 55 Boom-Boom Beck; 53 Ellis Clary; 54 Billy Jurges; 54 Sam Mele

== Player stats ==
=== Batting ===
==== Starters by position ====
Note: Pos = Position; G = Games played; AB = At bats; H = Hits; Avg. = Batting average; HR = Home runs; RBI = Runs batted in

Pos	Player	G	AB	H	Avg.	HR	RBI
C	Hal Naragon	71	195	47	.241	0	11
1B	Roy Sievers	115	385	93	.242	21	49
2B	Reno Bertoia	90	308	73	.237	8	29
SS	Billy Consolo	79	202	43	.213	0	10
3B	Harmon Killebrew	153	546	132	.242	42	105
LF	Jim Lemon	147	531	148	.279	33	100
CF	Bob Allison	150	570	149	.261	30	85
RF	Faye Throneberry	117	327	82	.251	10	42

==== Other batters ====
Note: G = Games played; AB = At bats; H = Hits; Avg. = Batting average; HR = Home runs; RBI = Runs batted in

Player	G	AB	H	Avg.	HR	RBI
Ron Samford	91	237	53	.224	5	22
Ken Aspromonte	70	225	55	.244	2	14
Julio Bécquer	108	220	59	.268	1	26
Lenny Green	88	190	46	.242	2	15
Clint Courtney	72	189	44	.233	2	18
Jay Porter	37	106	24	.226	1	10
Albie Pearson	25	80	15	.188	0	2
Norm Zauchin	19	71	15	.211	3	4
Ed Fitz Gerald	19	62	12	.194	0	5
Dan Dobbek	16	60	15	.250	1	5
Zoilo Versalles	29	59	9	.153	1	1
Johnny Schaive	16	59	9	.153	0	2
Steve Korcheck	22	51	8	.157	0	4
Herb Plews	27	40	9	.225	0	2
José Valdivielso	24	14	4	.286	0	0
Bobby Malkmus	6	0	0	----	0	0

=== Pitching ===
==== Starting pitchers ====
Note: G = Games pitched; IP = Innings pitched; W = Wins; L = Losses; ERA = Earned run average; SO = Strikeouts

Player	G	IP	W	L	ERA	SO
Camilo Pascual	32	238.2	17	10	2.64	185
Pedro Ramos	37	233.2	13	19	4.16	95
Russ Kemmerer	37	206.0	8	17	4.50	89
Bill Fischer	34	187.1	9	11	4.28	62

==== Other pitchers ====
Note: G = Games pitched; IP = Innings pitched; W = Wins; L = Losses; ERA = Earned run average; SO = Strikeouts

Player	G	IP	W	L	ERA	SO
Hal Griggs	37	97.2	2	8	5.25	43
Chuck Stobbs	41	90.2	1	8	2.98	50
John Romonosky	12	38.1	1	0	3.29	22
Vito Valentinetti	7	10.2	0	2	10.13	7
Jim Kaat	3	5.0	0	2	12.60	2

==== Relief pitchers ====
Note: G = Games pitched; W = Wins; L = Losses; SV = Saves; ERA = Earned run average; SO = Strikeouts

Player	G	W	L	SV	ERA	SO
Tex Clevenger	50	8	5	8	3.91	71
Dick Hyde	37	2	5	5	4.97	29
Hal Woodeshick	31	2	4	0	3.69	30
Jack Kralick	6	0	0	0	6.57	7
Ralph Lumenti	2	0	0	0	0.00	2
Tom McAvoy	1	0	0	0	0.00	0
Murray Wall	1	0	0	0	6.75	0

== Farm system ==
Level	Team	League	Manager
AA	Chattanooga Lookouts	Southern Association	Red Marion
A	Charlotte Hornets	Sally League	Gene Verble
B	Fox Cities Foxes	Illinois–Indiana–Iowa League	Jack McKeon
C	Missoula Timberjacks	Pioneer League	Ralph Rowe
D	Fort Walton Beach Jets	Alabama–Florida League	Vince Magi
D	Lynchburg Senators	Appalachian League	Chick Payne
D	Sanford Greyhounds	Florida State League	Packy Rogers, Ed Barberito and Joe Abernethy
