= Gene Leek =

American baseball player (born 1936)

- Third baseman
- Born: July 15, 1936 (age 90); San Diego, California, U.S.
- Batted: Right Threw: Right

MLB debut
- April 22, 1959, for the Cleveland Indians

Last MLB appearance
- September 30, 1962, for the Los Angeles Angels

MLB statistics
- Batting average: .221
- Home runs: 6
- Runs batted in: 25
- Stats at Baseball Reference

Teams
- Cleveland Indians (1959); Los Angeles Angels (1961–1962)

Eugene Harold Leek (born July 15, 1936) is an American former professional baseball player who appeared in 77 Major League Baseball games over three seasons for the Cleveland Indians (1959) and Los Angeles Angels (1961–62). Primarily a third baseman, he threw and batted right-handed, stood 6 feet (1.8 m) tall and weighed 185 pounds (84 kg).

Leek graduated from San Diego's Hoover High School — alma mater of Hall of Famer Ted Williams — and attended the University of Arizona. He jumped right from the Arizona campus to the Indians, and in his first MLB game, on April 22, 1959, Leek had two hits in four at bats in a 10–1 victory over the Detroit Tigers, including his first professional home run, a two-run shot off George Susce Jr. He cooled off thereafter and was sent to the minor leagues in May, spending part of the season with his hometown San Diego Padres, then in the Triple-A Pacific Coast League. He was recalled by the Indians in September, and started four more games at third base, but he then spent all of 1960 in the minors and was selected by the first-year Angels in the 1960 Major League Baseball expansion draft.

He spent the first three months of the 1961 season on the Angels' roster, starting 48 games at third base before being sent back to the Pacific Coast League. Injured during 1962, he appeared in only seven games for the Angels at the tail end of the season, then spent the rest of his career in the minors, retiring in 1968.

As a Major Leaguer, Leek collected 55 hits, including five doubles and one triple.
