= Mark Freeman (baseball) =

American baseball player (1930–2006)

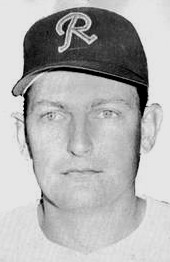
- Pitcher
- Born: December 7, 1930; Memphis, Tennessee
- Died: February 21, 2006 (aged 75); Rancho Mirage, California
- Batted: Right Threw: Right

MLB debut
- April 18, 1959, for the Kansas City Athletics

Last MLB appearance
- September 19, 1960, for the Chicago Cubs

MLB statistics
- Win–loss record: 3–3
- Earned run average: 5.56
- Strikeouts: 55
- Stats at Baseball Reference

Teams
- Kansas City Athletics (1959); New York Yankees (1959); Chicago Cubs (1960)

Mark Price Freeman (December 7, 1930 – February 21, 2006) was a right-handed baseball pitcher who played professionally from 1952 to 1954 and from 1956 to 1960, and in the major leagues from 1959 to 1960. He was originally signed by the New York Yankees as an amateur free-agent in 1952. He played in the big league for the Yankees, Kansas City Athletics and Chicago Cubs.

He attended Louisiana State University.

Freeman began his professional career in 1952, pitching for the Binghamton Triplets, going 7–5 with a 4.10 ERA in 17 games (14 starts). In 1953, he went 6–7 with a 2.94 ERA in 28 games (10 starts) with them. He played for the Birmingham Barons in 1954, going 5–5 with a 3.20 ERA in 13 games (12 starts). He did not play in 1955.

From 1956 to 1958 he played for the Denver Bears, going 10–14 with a 4.87 ERA in 30 games (29 starts) in 1956. In 1957, he went 12–6 with a 3.46 ERA in 24 starts, and in 1958 he went 13–10 with a 4.77 ERA in 33 games (32 starts).

On April 8, 1959, he was traded to the Kansas City Athletics for Jack Urban. He made his big league debut on April 18 against the Cleveland Indians, pitching three innings of relief, allowing four hits and two earned runs. He was sent back to the Yankees on May 8, and made one appearance for the Yankees, pitching seven innings and allowing two earned runs. In total, he made four big league appearances and posted a 5.06 ERA. Freeman also spent 26 games (23 starts) with the Seattle Rainiers in 1959, going 13–9 with a 3.42 ERA.

On May 19, 1960, Freeman was traded to the Cubs for Art Ceccarelli. Freeman made 30 appearances for the Cubs in 1960, with 22 of them coming in relief. He went 3–3 with a 5.63 ERA. That year, he made five appearances for the Richmond Virginians as well, and he went 2–1 with a 3.00 ERA.

Freeman played his final big league game on September 19, 1960. Overall, he went 3–3 with a 5.56 ERA in 34 big league games (nine starts). In 87 1/3 innings, he had 55 strikeouts. In eight minor league seasons, he went 68–57 with a 3.95 ERA in 176 games (148 starts).

He also had three hits in 22 major league at-bats.

Following his death, he was cremated.
