= Harry Simpson =

American baseball player (1925–1979)

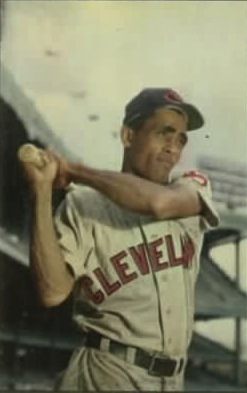
- Simpson, c. 1953
- Outfielder / First baseman
- Born: December 3, 1925; Atlanta, Georgia, U.S.
- Died: April 3, 1979 (aged 53); Akron, Ohio, U.S.
- Batted: Left Threw: Right

Professional debut
- NgL: 1946, for the Philadelphia Stars
- MLB: April 21, 1951, for the Cleveland Indians

Last MLB appearance
- September 27, 1959, for the Pittsburgh Pirates

MLB statistics
- Batting average: .268
- Home runs: 76
- Runs batted in: 434
- Stats at Baseball Reference

Teams
- Negro leagues: Philadelphia Stars (1946–1948); Major League Baseball: Cleveland Indians (1951–1953, 1955); Kansas City Athletics (1955–1957); New York Yankees (1957–1958); Kansas City Athletics (1958–1959); Chicago White Sox (1959); Pittsburgh Pirates (1959)

Career highlights and awards
- All-Star (1956)

Harry Leon "Suitcase" Simpson (December 3, 1925 – April 3, 1979) was an American outfielder and first baseman in Major League Baseball who played for the Cleveland Indians, Kansas City Athletics, New York Yankees, Chicago White Sox, and Pittsburgh Pirates in his eight-year career. He played in the World Series with the New York Yankees in 1957, which they lost.

== Career ==
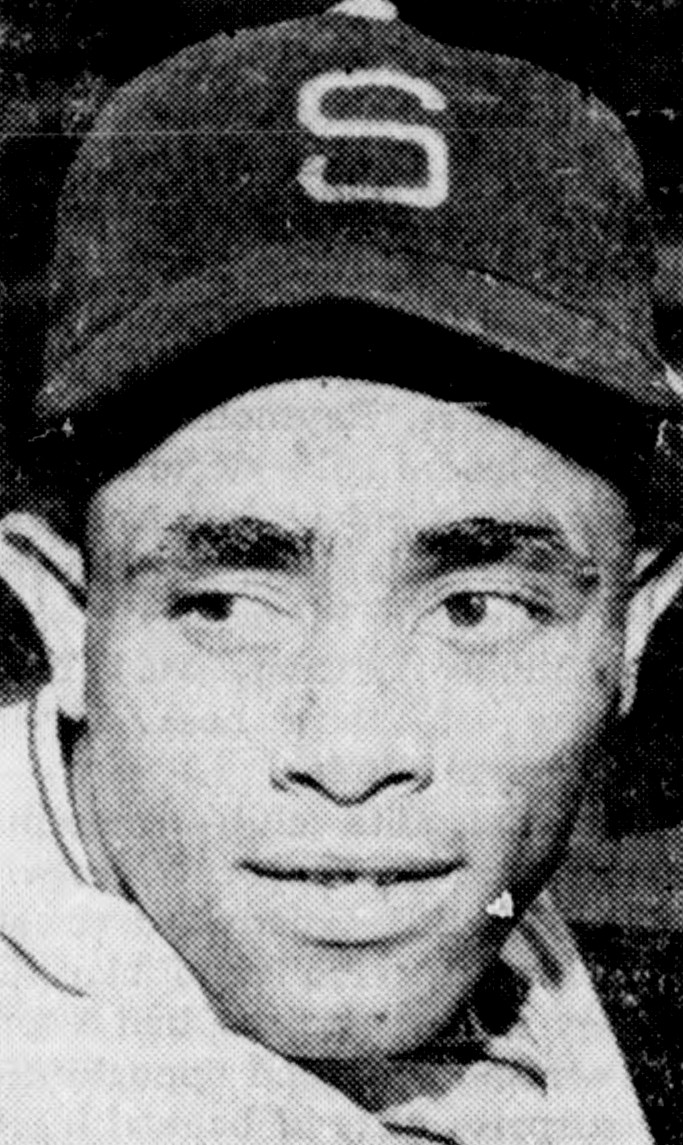
Simpson as a member of the San Diego Padres, circa 1950.

Born in Atlanta, Georgia, Simpson began his professional career with the Philadelphia Stars of the Negro National League, where he played from 1946 to 1948. Simpson became one of the earliest black players in the American League, playing first with the Cleveland Indians in 1951. Casey Stengel once called him the best defensive right fielder in the American League.

That his nickname of "Suitcase" came from his being frequently traded during his playing career is a common misconception. According to the 1951 Cleveland Indians Sketch Book, he was called "Suitcase" by sportswriters after the Toonerville Folks character, Suitcase Simpson, because of his size 13 shoe with feet as large as suitcases. This is years before his many trades. His real nickname was "Goody", which came from his willingness to run errands and help neighbors in his hometown of Dalton, Georgia.

In 888 games over eight seasons, Simpson compiled a .266 batting average (752-for-2829) with 101 doubles, 41 triples, 73 home runs, 381 RBI, 271 base on balls, .331 on-base percentage and .408 slugging percentage. He finished his career with a .984 fielding percentage playing at all three outfield positions and first base. In the 1957 World Series, he batted .083 (1-for-12) with 1 RBI.

Simpson died in Akron, Ohio in 1979 at age 53. He is buried in West Hill Cemetery in Dalton, Georgia, where a section of the cemetery and the road leading to that section are named in his honor.

== See also ==
- List of Negro league baseball players who played in Major League Baseball
- List of Major League Baseball annual triples leaders
