= Leo Kiely =

American baseball player (1929–1984)

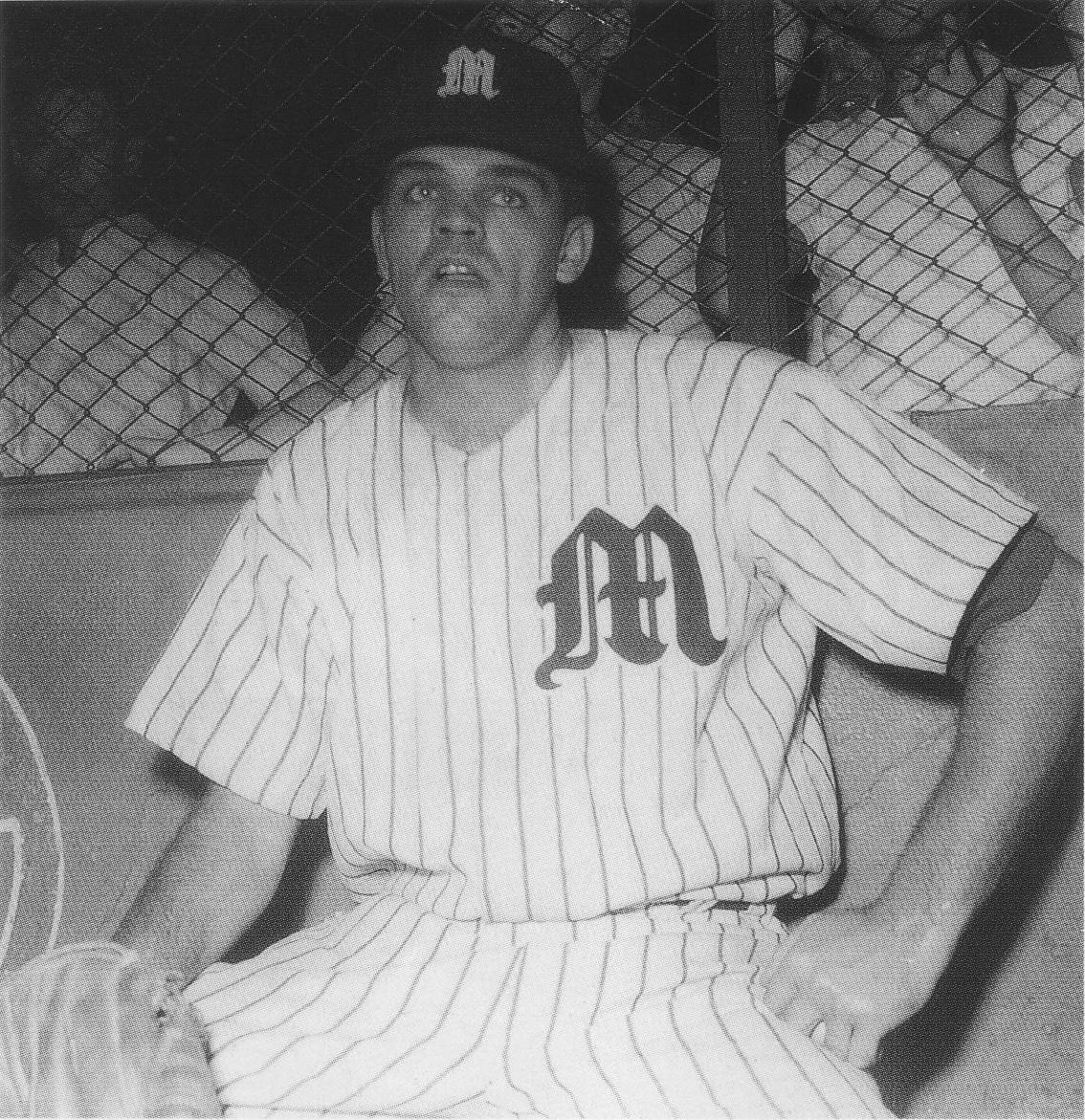
- Kiely with the Mainichi Orions in 1953
- Pitcher
- Born: November 30, 1929; Hoboken, New Jersey, U.S.
- Died: January 18, 1984 (aged 54); Montclair, New Jersey, U.S.
- Batted: Left Threw: Left

Professional debut
- MLB: June 27, 1951, for the Boston Red Sox
- NPB: August 8, 1953, for the Manichi Orions

Last appearance
- NPB: August 30, 1953, for the Manichi Orions
- MLB: June 20, 1960, for the Kansas City Athletics

MLB statistics
- Win–loss record: 26–27
- Earned run average: 3.37
- Strikeouts: 212

NPB statistics
- Win–loss record: 6–0
- Earned run average: 1.80
- Strikeouts: 32
- Stats at Baseball Reference

Teams
- Boston Red Sox (1951); Mainichi Orions (1953); Boston Red Sox (1954–1956, 1958–1959); Kansas City Athletics (1960)

Leo Patrick Kiely (November 30, 1929 – January 18, 1984) was an American pitcher in Major League Baseball who played between 1951 and 1960 for the Boston Red Sox (1951, 1954–56, 1958–59) and Kansas City Athletics (1960). Listed at 6 feet 2 inches (1.88 m), 180 pounds (82 kg), Kiely batted and threw left-handed. He was born in Hoboken, New Jersey.

Kiely entered the majors in the 1951 midseason with the Red Sox. He finished with a 7–7 record and a 3.34 ERA in 16 starts before joining the military during Korean War. In 1953, he pitched for the Mainichi Orions of the Pacific League to become the first major leaguer to play in Japanese baseball, while going 6–0 with a 1.80 ERA for Mainichi. It stood as the best record by a foreign rookie until 2005. He returned to Boston in 1954, after his military unit pulled out from Japan. Due to this, NPB banned teams from hiring foreign players who were serving in the military and played part-time from then on, and foreigners now had to play for the teams full time.

In 1957, Kiely was demoted to Triple-A. He finished with a 21–6 record and a 2.22 ERA for the PCL San Francisco Seals, leading the league in wins. 20 of them came in relief, including 14 in consecutive games, to set two PCL records. The 1958 TSN Guide also credited Kiely with 11 saves during the 14-game winning streak.

Kiely led the Red Sox with 12 saves in 1958 while going 5–2 with a 3.00 ERA in 47 relief appearances. He also pitched with the Athletics in 1960, his last major league season.

In a seven-season career, Kiely posted a 26–27 record with a 3.37 ERA in 209 games, including 39 starts, eight complete games, one shutout, 29 saves, and 523.0 innings of work. He went 63–36 during his minor league career.

Kiely died from cancer in Montclair, New Jersey at age 54.
