= Jack Harshman =

American baseball player (1927–2013)

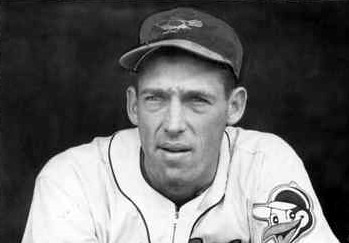
- Harshman in 1958
- Pitcher / First baseman
- Born: July 12, 1927; San Diego, California, U.S.
- Died: August 17, 2013 (aged 86); Georgetown, Texas, U.S.
- Batted: Left Threw: Left

MLB debut
- September 16, 1948, for the New York Giants

Last MLB appearance
- October 1, 1960, for the Cleveland Indians

MLB statistics
- Win–loss record: 69–65
- Earned run average: 3.50
- Strikeouts: 741
- Batting average: .179
- Home runs: 21
- Runs batted in: 65
- Stats at Baseball Reference

Teams
- New York Giants (1948, 1950, 1952); Chicago White Sox (1954–1957); Baltimore Orioles (1958–1959); Boston Red Sox (1959); Cleveland Indians (1959–1960)

John Elvin Harshman (July 12, 1927 – August 17, 2013) was an American Major League Baseball pitcher with the New York Giants, Chicago White Sox, Baltimore Orioles, Boston Red Sox, and Cleveland Indians between 1948 and 1960. He batted and threw left-handed.

== From slugger to pitcher ==
Harshman was born in San Diego, California, in 1927. He began his professional career at the age of 17 in 1945 for the San Diego Padres of the minor league AA Pacific Coast League. For his first five seasons, Harshman was being conditioned to be a major league hitter instead of a pitcher. Harshman's short stint in San Diego ended with a .254 batting average in 67 at-bats.

In 1946, Harshman moved over to the Class C Modesto Reds, where he hit .288 in 56 games before being shipped back to the PCL San Diego squad for only 3 games. 1947 was his first busy season as he played in 151 games for the Victoria Athletics in the Western International League. Harshman smashed 36 home runs while batting a modest .306. He then moved up yet again to the San Diego squad for just 11 games and a poor .148 average. Despite the sluggish ending, the major league New York Giants purchased his contract as a first baseman in December 1947.

In 1948, Harshman went to the Jersey City Giants of the AAA International League. He hit 24 home runs, drove in 76 runs, and batted .245. He received a brief call-up to the Giants and batted .250 in 9 plate appearances.

1949 was a breakout year for the 21-year-old slugger. In 150 games for the AA Minneapolis Millers, Harshman smashed 40 home runs and had 111 RBI. 1950 saw an unexpected change in Jack's progression. He batted a terrible .193 in 35 games for the Class A Jacksonville Tars and a below average .230 for Minneapolis. His second MLB stint with the Giants went even worse, batting just .125 in 32 at bats.

It was around this point that management thought about changing Harshman's role in the organization. During his sluggish 1950 season, he was brought in to pitch two games for the Jacksonville Tars. He threw for 12 innings and a 6.75 ERA, splitting his 2 games for a 1–1 record.

In 1951 Harshman got back on track with his slugging career. In 154 games for the Nashville Volunteers, he crashed 47 home runs with a fair .251 average. However, his manager once again experimented with Jack potentially being a pitcher, letting him take the field in 5 games. He posted another 1–1 record, but lowered his ERA to 3.94.

Despite bringing a huge bat in the previous season, the decision was made to give Harshman double duty as a pitcher and occasional utility hitter. He batted .222 with 8 home runs and 15 RBI in just 135 at bats, but most of his work for the 1952 season came from on the mound. Harshman pitched in 26 games with 14 starts, threw a total of 131 innings with 78 strikeouts, a 4.67 ERA, and an average 6–7 win–loss record.

1953 was Harshman's breakout year. In the AA Southern Association Nashville Volunteers, Jack posted a remarkable 23–7 record with a 3.27 ERA.

== Chicago White Sox ==
Despite his successful transition from a first baseman slugger to a young phenom pitcher, the Giants allowed the Chicago White Sox to purchase Harshman's contract. Jack made his White Sox debut against the Cleveland Indians on April 14, 1954. He started the game, but only lasted 3 2/3 innings after being tagged for four earned runs on eight hits. After another ineffective start on April 19, Harshman was demoted to the bullpen. He continued to struggle until being given another start on June 6. He responded by throwing a seven-hit shutout against the Washington Senators. On July 25, he struck out 16 Red Sox hitters, including Ted Williams in a complete game for a 5–2 win. At the time, it was the most strikeouts in the long history of Fenway Park. The record would stand for 32 years until a young flamethrower named Roger Clemens fanned a Major League best 20 batters. After that, Harshman settled down and had a largely successful season overall, including an exceptional performance for the month of August. Jack posted a 6–0 record with 47 strikeouts and a microscopic 0.77 ERA. His first full season posted some impressive numbers: a 14–8 won-loss record, a 2.95 ERA, four shutouts, and 134 strikeouts, the latter of which was fifth in the American League.

Harshman found moderate success in the 1955 season by putting up an 11–7 record and a 3.36 ERA while finishing ninth in the AL in strikeouts with 116. On June 21, 1956, at Comiskey Park, Jack achieved a rarity in Major League Baseball that had only happened twice before in the modern era. Both he and the opposing Baltimore Orioles starting pitcher Connie Johnson threw a one-hit complete game. Harshman picked up the win, 1-0. Jack would go on to throw three more shutouts in the season, compiling a 15–12 record with a 3.10 ERA and 143 strikeouts, good enough for eighth in the league.

== Baltimore Orioles ==
The 1956 season turned out to be the last solid campaign for Harshman. Following an 8–8 season with the 1957 White Sox, Harshman, Larry Doby and Jim Marshall were traded to the Baltimore Orioles for Billy Goodman, Tito Francona and Ray Moore at the Winter meetings. When it was discovered by the Orioles that Harshman was suffering from a slipped disc, Baseball Commissioner Ford Frick ordered the Chisox to send either $20,000 or an acceptable player to the Orioles. Russ Heman was sent to Baltimore to complete this deal.

Harshman was the first Orioles pitcher to win each of his first five appearances with the ballclub, a feat which was matched by Zach Eflin in 2024. Many of his numbers improved in 1958. His ERA was a career-low 2.89, third best in the AL, and he compiled a career-high 161 strikeouts to go with three shutouts. However, run support was scarce and he ended the season with a 12–15 record.

== Boston Red Sox and Cleveland Indians ==
Harshman became a journeyman in 1959, playing for three different teams during the season. Harshman began with an 0–6 record and a 6.85 ERA before being traded to the Boston Red Sox for Billy Hoeft on June 15, 1959. Harshman would only spend one month with the Red Sox, going 2–3 with a 6.57 ERA in two starts and six relief appearances.

The Cleveland Indians bought Harshman's contract on July 30, 1959. Over the remainder of the season, he posted a 5–1 record to go with a 2.59 ERA in 66 innings of work.

The 1960 season would prove to be the last for Harshman in the majors. At the age of 32, his back problems were catching up with him. He was forced onto the disabled list on April 24 after checking into the Cleveland Lakeside Hospital to treat problems connected to slipped discs. It would take three months before he would take the mound again. Right from the start, he could not regain his groove. On July 24, the Red Sox scored five runs on three hits and four walks before Harshman was pulled after three innings. He would never get back on track, ending his final season with a 2–4 record and a 3.98 ERA.

In October, Harshman was released by the Indians. In 1961, Jack participated in spring training in an effort to make the Los Angeles Angels roster, but instead ended up with a familiar team from his first professional year, the AAA Pacific Coast League San Diego Padres. He would go on to pitch in only four games, compiling a 0–1 record and a 6.00 ERA.

== Death ==
On August 17, 2013, Harshman died in Georgetown, Texas, where he lived. He was 86 years old. He was buried at the Fort Rosecrans National Cemetery in San Diego, California.

== Personal life ==
Harshman was survived by his wife Virginia. He was related to the actress Margo Harshman and former Washington State University and University of Washington basketball coach Marv Harshman. He had daughters Patricia and Joyce with wife Genevieve; a stepdaughter Laveen with wife Frances; a son Jack, Jr. with wife Dorothy; a daughter Jacquelyn with wife Lillian, and stepsons with wife Virginia.

== See also ==
- List of Major League Baseball all-time leaders in home runs by pitchers
