= 1959 Major League Baseball season =

1959 MLB season
- League: American League (AL); National League (NL)
- Sport: Baseball
- Duration: Regular season: April 9 – September 27, 1959 (AL); April 9 – September 29, 1959 (NL); World Series: October 1–8, 1959
- Games: 154
- Teams: 16 (8 per league)
- TV partner(s): NBC, CBS

Regular season
- Season MVP: AL: Nellie Fox (CWS); NL: Ernie Banks (CHC)
- AL champions: Chicago White Sox
- AL runners-up: Cleveland Indians
- NL champions: Los Angeles Dodgers
- NL runners-up: Milwaukee Braves

World Series
- Champions: Los Angeles Dodgers
- Runners-up: Chicago White Sox
- World Series MVP: Larry Sherry (LAD)

MLB seasons
- ← 1958 1960 →

Locations of teams for the 1955–1960 American League seasons
American League
Locations of teams for the 1959 National League season
National League

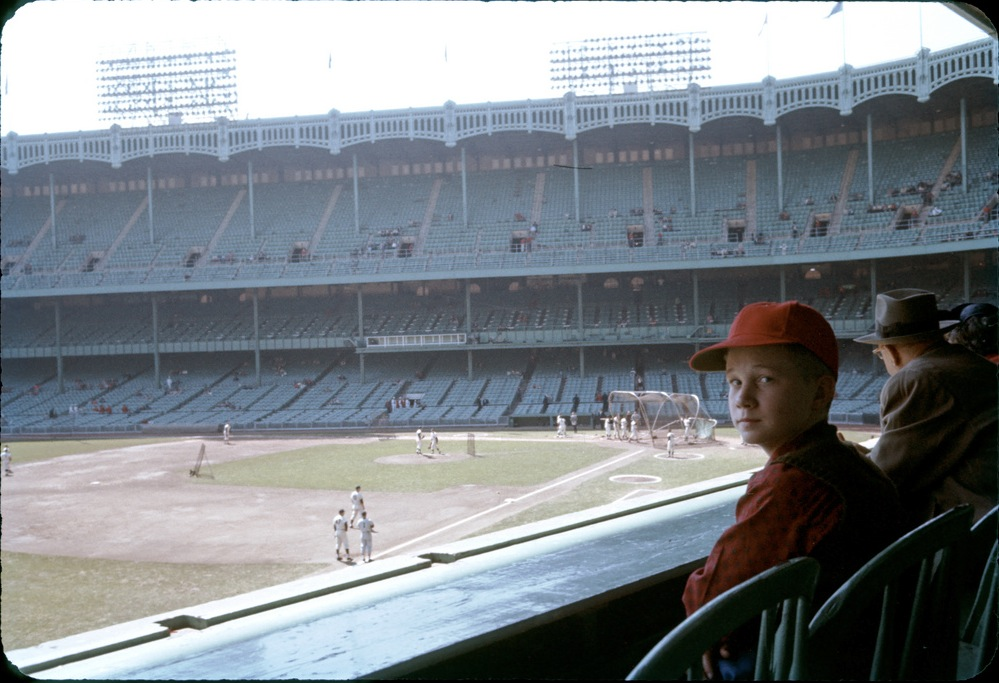
Yankees – Red Sox game in 1959.

The 1959 major league baseball season began on April 9, 1959. The regular season ended on September 29, with the Los Angeles Dodgers and Chicago White Sox as the regular season champions of the National League and American League, respectively. The Dodgers swept the Milwaukee Braves in a regular season best-of-three tiebreaker, for the National League title, after both teams finished their 154-game schedules with identical 86–68 records. This was the fourth regular season tie-breaker. The postseason began with Game 1 of the 56th World Series on October 1 and ended with Game 6 on October 8. The Dodgers defeated the White Sox, four games to two, capturing their second championship in franchise history, their first since in 1955, and first in Los Angeles. This was the first appearance of the White Sox in the "Fall Classic" since the infamous Black Sox Scandal of the 1919 World Series and interrupted a Yankees' dynasty that dominated the American League between 1949 and 1964. Going into the season, the defending World Series champions were the New York Yankees from the 1958 season.

For the first time in professional baseball history, there were two separate All-Star Games played. The first, the 26th All-Star Game, was held on July 7 at Forbes Field in Pittsburgh, Pennsylvania, home of the Pittsburgh Pirates. The National League won, 5–1. The second, the 27th All-Star Game, was held on August 3 at Los Angeles Memorial Coliseum in Los Angeles, California, home of the Los Angeles Dodgers. The American League won, 5–3.

In the National League, the Cincinnati Redlegs reverted to their 1890–1952 name, the Cincinnati Reds.

On July 21, the Boston Red Sox became the 16th and final team in professional baseball to break the color line when they fielded Pumpsie Green, 12 years after Jackie Robinson of the Brooklyn Dodgers broke the professional baseball color line in 1947. The Red Sox were notably resistant to integration due to team owner Tom Yawkey, and only did so following a lawsuit charging Yawkey and general manager Bucky Harris with discrimination and the deliberate barring of black players from the Red Sox. The NAACP issued charges of "following an anti-Negro policy", and the Massachusetts Commission Against Discrimination announced a public hearing on racial bias against the Red Sox.

The season is notable as the only one between 1950 and 1981 where no pitcher pitched a no-hitter.^{[a]}

== Schedule ==
The 1959 schedule consisted of 154 games for all teams in the American League and National League, each of which had eight teams. Each team was scheduled to play 22 games against the other seven teams of their respective league. This continued the format put in place since the 1904 season (except for 1919) and would be used until 1961 in the American League and 1962 in the National League.

Opening Day took place on April 9, featuring four teams. The final day of the scheduled regular season was on September 27, which saw all sixteen teams play, the first time since 1957. Due to the Los Angeles Dodgers and Milwaukee Braves finishing with the same record of 86–68, a best-of-three tie-breaker was scheduled, to be considered an extension of the regular season. The World Series took place between October 1 and October 8.

== Rule changes ==
The 1959 season saw the following rule changes:

- The minimum outfield dimensions for all new ballparks are to be 325 feet down the left and right field foul lines, and 400 feet in center field.
- Traditional waivers are to now be suspended from November 21 to December 15 every year. This was to enable trades between the American and National Leagues, without the usual requirement that players were to be waived out of their respective leagues.
- Though not approved in time for the fall 1958 draft, the selection prices for players drafted by major-league team was reduced from $25,000 (equivalent to $276,000 in 2025) to $15,000 (equivalent to $166,000 in 2025).
- Rule 5 drafts were amended to allow teams to draft first year pro players, who were not on a team's 40-man major-league roster.
  - Given that a player was drafted under the now ceased bonus rule, the team which originally drafted a player must still cover the bonus money. For the entire season, the team that drafted said player must keep said player in the majors, or else be forced to return the player to his pre-Rule 5 draft team at the cost of $7,500 (equivalent to $82,800 in 2025).

== Teams ==
League	Team	City	Ballpark	Capacity	Manager
American League	Baltimore Orioles	Baltimore, Maryland	Baltimore Memorial Stadium	47,778	Paul Richards
American League	Boston Red Sox	Boston, Massachusetts	Fenway Park	34,819	Pinky Higgins
American League	Boston Red Sox	Boston, Massachusetts	Fenway Park	34,819	Rudy York
American League	Boston Red Sox	Boston, Massachusetts	Fenway Park	34,819	Billy Jurges
American League	Chicago White Sox	Chicago, Illinois	Comiskey Park	46,550	Al López
American League	Cleveland Indians	Cleveland, Ohio	Cleveland Stadium	73,811	Joe Gordon
American League	Detroit Tigers	Detroit, Michigan	Briggs Stadium	58,000	Bill Norman
American League	Detroit Tigers	Detroit, Michigan	Briggs Stadium	58,000	Jimmy Dykes
American League	Kansas City Athletics	Kansas City, Missouri	Municipal Stadium	30,296	Harry Craft
American League	New York Yankees	New York, New York	Yankee Stadium	67,205	Casey Stengel
American League	Washington Senators	Washington, D.C.	Griffith Stadium	28,669	Cookie Lavagetto
National League	Chicago Cubs	Chicago, Illinois	Wrigley Field	36,755	Bob Scheffing
National League	Cincinnati Reds	Cincinnati, Ohio	Crosley Field	30,322	Mayo Smith
National League	Cincinnati Reds	Cincinnati, Ohio	Crosley Field	30,322	Fred Hutchinson
National League	Los Angeles Dodgers	Los Angeles, California	Los Angeles Memorial Coliseum	94,600	Walter Alston
National League	Milwaukee Braves	Milwaukee, Wisconsin	Milwaukee County Stadium	43,768	Fred Haney
National League	Philadelphia Phillies	Philadelphia, Pennsylvania	Connie Mack Stadium	33,359	Eddie Sawyer
National League	Pittsburgh Pirates	Pittsburgh, Pennsylvania	Forbes Field	34,249	Danny Murtaugh
National League	San Francisco Giants	San Francisco, California	Seals Stadium	22,900	Bill Rigney
National League	St. Louis Cardinals	St. Louis, Missouri	Busch Stadium	30,500	Solly Hemus

== Standings ==
=== American League ===
American League
Team	W	L	Pct.	GB	Home	Road
Chicago White Sox	94	60	.610	—	47‍–‍30	47‍–‍30
Cleveland Indians	89	65	.578	5	43‍–‍34	46‍–‍31
New York Yankees	79	75	.513	15	40‍–‍37	39‍–‍38
Detroit Tigers	76	78	.494	18	41‍–‍36	35‍–‍42
Boston Red Sox	75	79	.487	19	43‍–‍34	32‍–‍45
Baltimore Orioles	74	80	.481	20	38‍–‍39	36‍–‍41
Kansas City Athletics	66	88	.429	28	37‍–‍40	29‍–‍48
Washington Senators	63	91	.409	31	34‍–‍43	29‍–‍48

=== National League ===
National League
Team	W	L	Pct.	GB	Home	Road
Los Angeles Dodgers	88	68	.564	—	46‍–‍32	42‍–‍36
Milwaukee Braves	86	70	.551	2	49‍–‍29	37‍–‍41
San Francisco Giants	83	71	.539	4	42‍–‍35	41‍–‍36
Pittsburgh Pirates	78	76	.506	9	47‍–‍30	31‍–‍46
Chicago Cubs	74	80	.481	13	38‍–‍39	36‍–‍41
Cincinnati Reds	74	80	.481	13	43‍–‍34	31‍–‍46
St. Louis Cardinals	71	83	.461	16	42‍–‍35	29‍–‍48
Philadelphia Phillies	64	90	.416	23	37‍–‍40	27‍–‍50

- The Los Angeles Dodgers defeated the Milwaukee Braves in a regular season best-of-three tie-breaker series to earn the National League pennant.

=== Tie games ===
4 tie games (2 in AL, 2 in NL), which are not factored into winning percentage or games behind (and were often replayed again) occurred throughout the season.

==== American League ====
The Chicago White Sox had two tie games. The Baltimore Orioles and New York Yankees had one each.

- July 29, Chicago White Sox vs. New York Yankees, tied at 4 after a shortened six innings due to rain.
- August 6, Baltimore Orioles vs. Chicago White Sox, tied at 1 after 18 innings on account of curfew.

==== National League ====
The Chicago Cubs, Milwaukee Braves, Philadelphia Phillies, and Pittsburgh Pirates had one each.

- April 17, Milwaukee Braves vs. Pittsburgh Pirates, tied at 2 after nine innings. Two pitches were thrown in the top of the 10th inning before a one hour rain delay at 4:03 p.m. lead to the 10th inning to be negated and game ended due to rain and made up entirely at a later date.
- August 19 (game 2), Philadelphia Phillies vs. Chicago Cubs, tied at 7 after five plate appearances and two outs in the bottom of the 12th inning on account of curfew.

== Postseason ==
The postseason began on September 28 and ended on October 8 with the Los Angeles Dodgers defeating the Chicago White Sox in the 1959 World Series in six games.

=== Bracket ===
National League playoff			World Series
			AL	Chicago White Sox	2
NL	Los Angeles	2	NL	Los Angeles	4
NL	Milwaukee	0

== Managerial changes ==
=== Off-season ===
Team	Former Manager	New Manager
Cincinnati Reds	Jimmy Dykes	Mayo Smith
St. Louis Cardinals	Stan Hack	Solly Hemus

=== In-season ===
Team	Former Manager	New Manager
Boston Red Sox	Pinky Higgins	Rudy York
Boston Red Sox	Rudy York	Billy Jurges
Cincinnati Reds	Mayo Smith	Fred Hutchinson
Detroit Tigers	Bill Norman	Jimmy Dykes

== League leaders ==
=== American League ===
Hitting leaders
Stat	Player	Total
AVG	Harvey Kuenn (DET)	.353
OPS	Al Kaline (DET)	.940
HR	Rocky Colavito (CLE); Harmon Killebrew (WSH)	42
RBI	Jackie Jensen (BOS)	112
R	Eddie Yost (DET)	115
H	Harvey Kuenn (DET)	198
SB	Luis Aparicio (CWS)	56

Pitching leaders
Stat	Player	Total
W	Early Wynn (CWS)	22
L	Pedro Ramos (WSH)	19
ERA	Hoyt Wilhelm (BAL)	2.19
K	Jim Bunning (DET)	201
IP	Early Wynn (CWS)	255.2
SV	Turk Lown (CWS); Gerry Staley (CWS)	15
WHIP	Art Ditmar (NYY)	1.030

=== National League ===
Hitting leaders
Stat	Player	Total
AVG	Hank Aaron (MIL)	.355
OPS	Hank Aaron (MIL)	1.037
HR	Eddie Mathews (MIL)	46
RBI	Ernie Banks (CHC)	143
R	Vada Pinson (CIN)	131
H	Hank Aaron (MIL)	223
SB	Willie Mays (SF)	27

Pitching leaders
Stat	Player	Total
W	Lew Burdette (MIL); Sam Jones (SF); Warren Spahn (MIL)	21
L	Bob Friend (PIT)	19
ERA	Sam Jones (SF)	2.83
K	Don Drysdale (LAD)	242
IP	Warren Spahn (MIL)	292.0
SV	Lindy McDaniel (STL)	16
WHIP	Harvey Haddix (PIT)	1.061

== Milestones ==
=== Batters ===
==== Four home runs in one game ====
- Rocky Colavito (CLE):
  - Became the eighth player to hit four home runs in one game in a 11–8 win against the Baltimore Orioles on June 10.

==== Cycles ====
- Frank Robinson (CIN):
  - Robinson hit for his first cycle and eighth in franchise history, on May 2 against the Los Angeles Dodgers.

==== Other batting accomplishments ====
- Stan Musial (STL):
  - Became the sixth player in Major League history to hit 400 home runs in the ninth inning in a walk-off against the Chicago Cubs on May 7.

=== Pitchers ===
- Sandy Koufax (LAD):
  - Set a modern National League record and became the second modern Major League player to strike out batters in a single game in a 5–2 win against the San Francisco Giants on August 31.

== Awards and honors ==
=== Regular season ===
Baseball Writers' Association of America Awards
BBWAA Award	National League	American League
Rookie of the Year	Willie McCovey (SF)	Bob Allison (WSH)
Cy Young Award	—	Early Wynn (CWS)
Most Valuable Player	Ernie Banks (CHC)	Nellie Fox (CWS)
Babe Ruth Award (World Series MVP)	Larry Sherry (LAD)	—
Gold Glove Awards
Position	National League	American League
Pitcher	Harvey Haddix (PIT)	Bobby Shantz (NYY)
Catcher	Del Crandall (MIL)	Sherm Lollar (CWS)
1st Base	Gil Hodges (LAD)	Vic Power (CLE)
2nd Base	Charlie Neal (LAD)	Nellie Fox (CWS)
3rd Base	Ken Boyer (STL)	Frank Malzone (BOS)
Shortstop	Roy McMillan (CIN)	Luis Aparicio (CWS)
Left field	Jackie Brandt (SF)	Minnie Miñoso (CLE)
Center field	Willie Mays (SF)	Al Kaline (DET)
Right field	Hank Aaron (MIL)	Jackie Jensen (BOS)

=== Other awards ===
- Sport Magazine's World Series Most Valuable Player Award: Larry Sherry (LAD)

The Sporting News Awards
Award	National League	American League
Player of the Year	—	Early Wynn (CWS)
Pitcher of the Year	Sam Jones (SF)	Early Wynn (CWS)
Rookie of the Year	Willie McCovey (SF)	Bob Allison (WSH)
Manager of the Year	Walter Alston (LAD)	—
Executive of the Year	Buzzie Bavasi (LAD)	—

=== Monthly awards ===
==== Player of the Month ====
Month	National League
May	Hank Aaron (MIL); Harvey Haddix (PIT)
June	Roy Face (PIT)
July	Don Drysdale (LAD)
August	Vern Law (PIT); Willie McCovey (SF)
September	Eddie Mathews (MIL)

=== Baseball Hall of Fame ===
- Zack Wheat

== Home field attendance ==
Team name	Wins	%±	Home attendance	%±	Per game
Los Angeles Dodgers	88	23.9%	2,071,045	12.2%	26,552
Milwaukee Braves	86	−6.5%	1,749,112	−11.3%	22,141
New York Yankees	79	−14.1%	1,552,030	8.7%	20,156
Cleveland Indians	89	15.6%	1,497,976	125.7%	19,454
Chicago White Sox	94	14.6%	1,423,144	78.5%	18,245
San Francisco Giants	83	3.8%	1,422,130	11.7%	18,469
Pittsburgh Pirates	78	−7.1%	1,359,917	3.7%	17,661
Detroit Tigers	76	−1.3%	1,221,221	11.1%	15,860
Boston Red Sox	75	−5.1%	984,102	−8.6%	12,781
Kansas City Athletics	66	−9.6%	963,683	4.2%	12,515
St. Louis Cardinals	71	−1.4%	929,953	−12.6%	12,077
Baltimore Orioles	74	0.0%	891,926	7.5%	11,435
Chicago Cubs	74	2.8%	858,255	−12.4%	11,146
Philadelphia Phillies	64	−7.2%	802,815	−13.8%	10,293
Cincinnati Reds	74	−2.6%	801,298	1.6%	10,406
Washington Senators	63	3.3%	615,372	29.5%	7,992

== Venues ==
The San Francisco Giants would play their final game at Seals Stadium on September 20 against the Los Angeles Dodgers, moving into Candlestick Park for the start of the 1960 season.

== Media ==
=== Television ===
CBS and NBC aired weekend Game of the Week broadcasts. The All-Star Game and World Series also aired on NBC. The rights to air the 1959 National League tie-breaker series were awarded to ABC.

== See also ==
- 1959 in baseball (Events, Births, Deaths)
- 1959 Nippon Professional Baseball season

== Notes ==
^{a} Other Major League Baseball seasons since 1901 without a no-hitter pitched are 1909, 1913, 1921, 1927–1928, 1932–1933, 1936, 1939, 1942–1943, 1949, 1982, 1985, 1989, 2000, 2005, and 2025.
