= Earl Battey =

American baseball player (1935–2003)

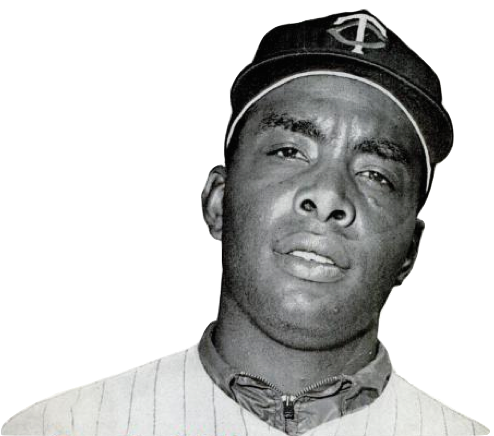
- Battey in 1961
- Catcher
- Born: January 5, 1935; Los Angeles, California, U.S.
- Died: November 15, 2003 (aged 68); Ocala, Florida, U.S.
- Batted: Right Threw: Right

MLB debut
- September 10, 1955, for the Chicago White Sox

Last MLB appearance
- September 27, 1967, for the Minnesota Twins

MLB statistics
- Batting average: .270
- Home runs: 104
- Runs batted in: 449
- Stats at Baseball Reference

Teams
- Chicago White Sox (1955–1959); Washington Senators / Minnesota Twins (1960–1967)

Career highlights and awards
- 5× All-Star (1962–1963, 1965, 1966); 3× Gold Glove Award (1960–1962); Minnesota Twins Hall of Fame

Earl Jesse Battey, Jr. (January 5, 1935 – November 15, 2003) was an American professional baseball player. He played in Major League Baseball as a catcher from 1955 to 1967, most prominently for the Minnesota Twins where he was a five-time All-Star and an integral member of the 1965 American League pennant-winning team.

Battey began his career with the Chicago White Sox but blossomed during his tenure with the Twins when he emerged as a potent bat for a catcher and was recognized as one of the top defenders at the position in the American League, winning three consecutive Gold Glove Awards between 1960 and 1962. He was posthumously inducted into the Minnesota Twins Hall of Fame in 2004.

== Major League career ==
=== White Sox ===
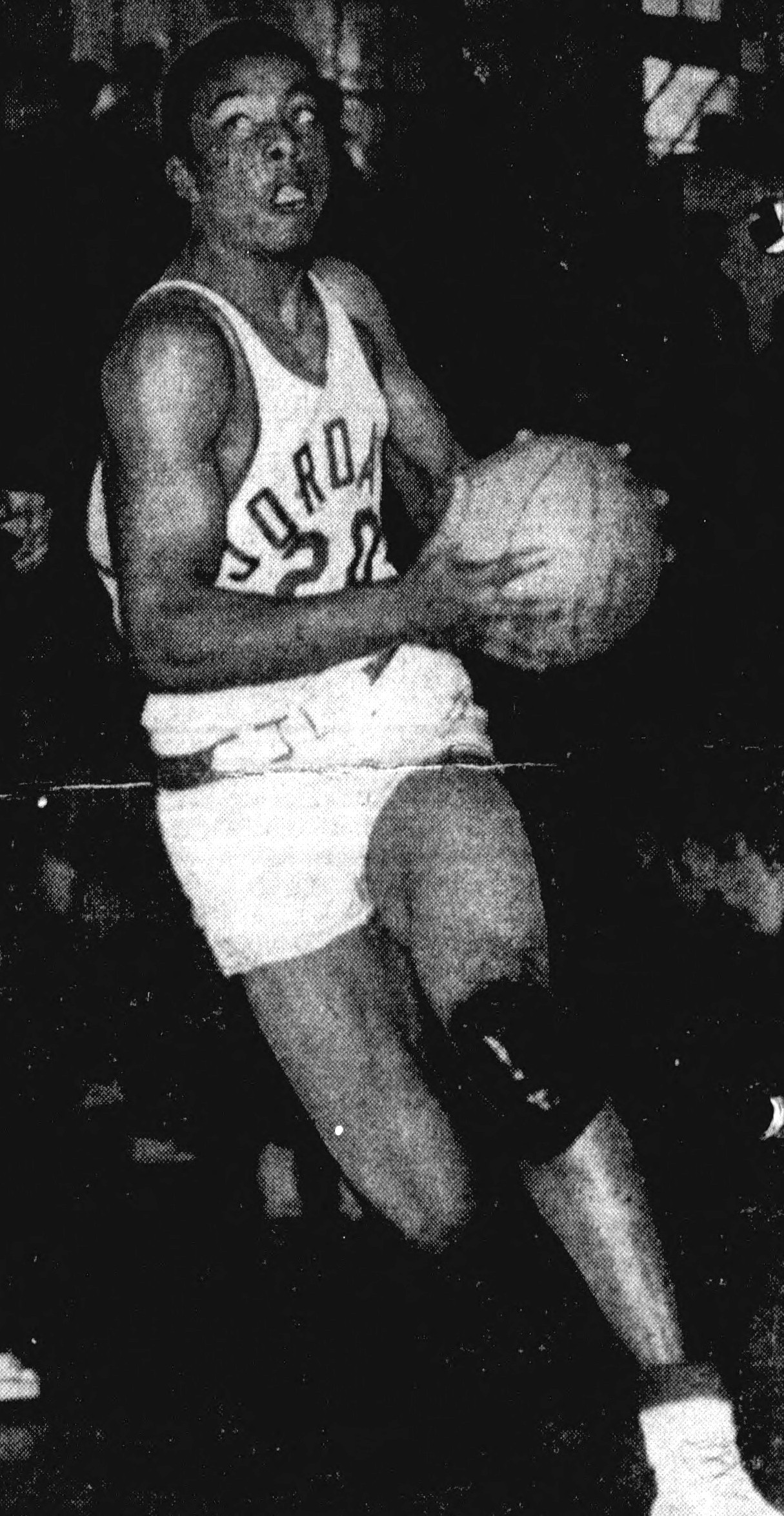
Battey in 1950 as a member of the Jordan High School men's basketball team

Battey was born in Los Angeles, and attended Jordan High School in the city's Watts neighborhood. He was signed as an amateur free agent by the Chicago White Sox prior to the 1953 season. Assigned to the Colorado Springs Sky Sox in the Single-A Western League, he managed only a .158 batting average in 26 games before being demoted to the Waterloo White Hawks in the B-level Illinois–Indiana–Iowa League; there he responded with a .292 average and 11 home runs in 129 games. In 1955, Battey was promoted to the Triple-A Charleston Senators in the American Association, where he hit .269 batting with 8 home runs and 71 runs batted in. His performance earned him a promotion to the major leagues, where he made his debut with the White Sox on September 10, 1955 at the age of 20.

Battey returned to the minor leagues in 1956, playing in 36 games for the Toronto Maple Leafs. Despite hitting only .178, he played well defensively. The White Sox called him back to the major leagues to back up starting catcher Sherm Lollar, for the remainder of the season although, he spent the time on the bench and played in only four games. Battey continued to learn from the perennial All-Star Lollar during the 1957 season but struggled offensively. He was sent back to the minor leagues in August, where he hit 9 home runs and 20 runs batted in for the Triple-A Los Angeles Angels of the Pacific Coast League. The White Sox recalled Battey to the major leagues in September – this time to stay.

Battey hit .226 along with 8 home runs in 1958, as the White Sox battled back from being in last place on June 14 to finish the season in second place behind the New York Yankees. In 1959 he was overtaken by rookie Johnny Romano as the second string catcher, ending the year hitting .219 in 26 games. Although the White Sox won the American League pennant, Battey did not appear in the post-season as the White Sox lost to the Los Angeles Dodgers in the 1959 World Series.

Realizing they had a logjam at catcher with the veteran, and still productive, Lollar, the impressive rookie Romano, and the still-valuable-as-a-defensive-backup Battey, White Sox owner and general manager Bill Veeck solved his problem in two deals that showed immediate dividends for the White Sox, but were long-term disasters. On December 6, 1959, Veeck traded Romano, rookie first baseman Norm Cash, and utility man Bubba Phillips to the Cleveland Indians for outfielder Minnie Miñoso, catcher Dick Brown, pitcher Don Ferrarese, and minor league pitcher Jake Striker. Then on April 4, 1960, Veeck shipped Battey, first baseman Don Mincher, and $150,000 to the Washington Senators for veteran first baseman Roy Sievers. Although Sievers and Miñoso combined for three 20-home run seasons, two All-Star appearances, one Gold Glove award in 1960 and 1961 with the White Sox, the rest of the players the team received in trade failed to have an impact. Conversely the young players that the White Sox traded to get these veterans, namely Battey, Mincher, Romano, and Cash, all sparkled, and account for 17 20-home run seasons, four 30-home run seasons, one 40-home run season, 12 all-star team selections, three Gold Gloves (all by Battey), and garnered Most Valuable Player support in numerous seasons. Meanwhile, the catcher that the White Sox chose to keep, Lollar, went into decline after 1959, was relegated to a backup role in 1962, and retired after the 1963 season, leaving the White Sox with an underwhelming starting catcher, including a two-year return of an aging Romano in 1965.

=== Senators/Twins ===
Battey became the starting catcher for the Senators and immediately showed his defensive abilities, leading the American League in assists and putouts for four consecutive years (1960 to 1963). For the first time in the majors Battey shined offensively, hitting as he had in the minor leagues. In 1960 Battey played in a then-career-high 137 games and hit .270, with 15 home runs and 60 RBIs. He also earned his first Gold Glove Award and placed eighth in voting for the 1960 American League Most Valuable Player Award. In October, Battey was named to the United Press International's American League All-Star team.

Prior to the 1961 season, the Senators relocated to the Minneapolis-St. Paul metro area and were renamed the Minnesota Twins. Battey teamed with future Baseball Hall of Fame member Harmon Killebrew, future MVP Zoilo Versalles, and All-Stars Bob Allison, Camilo Pascual, and Jim Kaat to form the nucleus of what would become a pennant-winning team. Building on his breakout 1960 season, Battey ended 1961 with a .302 batting average, sixth best in the American League, and won his second Gold Glove Award.

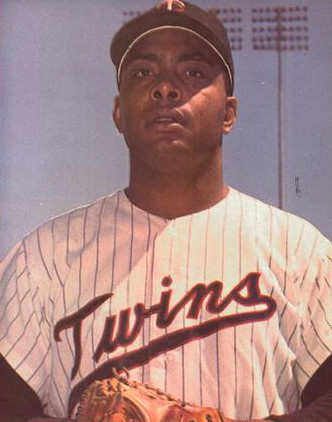
Battey, circa 1965

Battey was recognized as one of the top catchers in the major leagues when he was selected to be the starting catcher for the American League in the 1962 All-Star Games. He was the Twins catcher on August 26, 1962, when pitcher Jack Kralick threw a no-hitter. Battey appeared in a career-high 148 games and ended the season with a .280 batting average, highest among major league catchers. He also set a record for major league catchers by picking off 15 base runners as he won his third consecutive Gold Glove Award. The Twins, long an American League doormat while in Washington, finished a surprising second in the standings with 91 wins, 5 games behind the World Series-winning New York Yankees.

Battey had his finest season at the plate in 1963, hitting .285 while setting career highs in home runs (26), RBIs (84), and slugging percentage (.476). He was voted to his second straight All-Star team and collected his only all-star game hit, a third-inning single that scored Boston Red Sox third baseman Frank Malzone from second base to tie the game at 3-3). He placed seventh in American League Most Valuable Player Award balloting (behind Killebrew and winner and fellow catcher Elston Howard). The Twins again finished with 91 wins, which this time was only good enough for third place, 15½ games behind the World Series runner-up Yankees. Both Battey and the Twins took a step backward in 1964; the team struggled to a 79-win, sixth-place finish in the American League, with Battey hitting .272 with 12 home runs and 51 RBIs in 131 games.

Battey rebounded in 1965 and was hitting nearly .300 at mid-season, when he received the most All-Star votes among American League players. The 1965 All-Star Game was played in his home ball park, Metropolitan Stadium. He was one of six Twins to appear in the 1965 mid-season classic (with Versalles, Killebrew, Jimmie Hall, Mudcat Grant, and Tony Oliva). Battey was an integral member of the Twins team that went on to clinch the American League pennant, hitting for a .297 batting average and placing tenth in voting for the American League Most Valuable Player Award (with teammate Versalles winning and six Twins finishing in the top 15). He started every game in the 1965 World Series but only hit for a .120 average, with 2 RBIs and one extra base hit, as the Twins lost the series to the Los Angeles Dodgers in seven games.

In 1966, Battey hit .255 with 4 home runs and 31 RBIs while playing in 115 games, his lowest totals since his backup days in Chicago. He was nevertheless selected for his fourth and final All-Star team, and replaced the starting catcher, Tiger Bill Freehan, in the bottom of the game's sixth inning.

The 1967 season was Battey's last, as he battled a thyroid condition that caused him to gain weight. He appeared in only 48 games and hit for just a .165 average. The Twins' three catchers that season - Battey, Jerry Zimmerman, and Russ Nixon - combined to hit just .176, and the Twins went 2-5 in late September and lost the pennant to the Red Sox in the last game of the season.

== Career statistics ==
In a 13-year major league career, Battey played in 1,141 games, accumulating 969 hits in 3,586 at bats for a .270 career batting average along with 104 home runs and 449 RBIs. He led the American League four times in assists and putouts, three times in baserunners caught stealing and twice in caught stealing percentage, with a career fielding percentage of .990. A four-time All-Star, Battey won three Gold Glove Awards. Over his career, he threw out 43.44% of the base runners who tried to steal a base on him, 15th on the all-time list. In 1961, the reigning American League stolen base champion, Luis Aparicio, rated Battey as the toughest catcher on which to attempt a stolen base.

Richard Kendall of the Society for American Baseball Research devised a study that ranked Battey as the seventh most dominating fielding catcher in major league history. Battey played more games at catcher than any other player in Twins history (831). He was named to the Twins' 40th anniversary team in 2000. In 1961, Battey became one of the first Major League players to wear an earflap on his batting helmet, after twice suffering broken cheekbones when hit by pitches.

== Post-retirement ==
After his playing career, Battey lived in Co-op City in the Bronx and spent 12 years working in New York City as a recreation specialist with disturbed young boys. Fulfilling a promise he had made to his mother, Battey enrolled at Bethune-Cookman University in 1980. Taking 34 credits a semester, he finished his undergraduate degree in Education in 2½ years, while coaching the men's basketball team, and earned the distinction of summa cum laude honors. After graduating from Bethune-Cookman, he became a high school teacher and baseball coach in Ocala, Florida.

Battey was also part of a charity program sponsored by Consolidated Edison whereby children were given free bleacher tickets to New York Yankee games. He talked baseball and was a "big brother" to all the kids who were lucky enough to benefit from the program.

Battey died of cancer at the age of 68 in Ocala, Florida. In 2004, he was posthumously elected to the Twins Hall of Fame. In 2010, the Twins celebrated their 50th season in Minnesota and Battey was voted one of the 50 Greatest Twins Players.

Earl's grandson Evan Battey played basketball for the University of Colorado, and as of 2024 was a member of Rilski Sportist in Bulgaria's National Basketball League (NBL).
