= 1960 Chicago White Sox season =

1960 Chicago White Sox
- League: American League
- Ballpark: Comiskey Park
- City: Chicago
- Record: 87–67 (.565)
- League place: 3rd
- Owners: Bill Veeck
- General managers: Hank Greenberg
- Managers: Al López
- Television: WGN-TV (Jack Brickhouse, Vince Lloyd)
- Radio: WCFL (Bob Elson, Don Wells)

The 1960 Chicago White Sox season was the team's 60th season in the major leagues, and its 61st season overall. They finished with a record of 87–67, good enough for third place in the American League, 10 games behind the first-place New York Yankees.

== Offseason ==
- December 6, 1959: Johnny Romano, Bubba Phillips, and Norm Cash were traded by the White Sox to the Cleveland Indians for Minnie Miñoso, Dick Brown, Don Ferrarese, and Jake Striker.
- December 9, 1959: Johnny Callison was traded by the White Sox to the Philadelphia Phillies for Gene Freese.
- January 9, 1960: Chico Carrasquel was signed as a free agent by the White Sox.

== Regular season ==
- During the season, the White Sox became the first major sports team to put player names on the backs of uniforms. The White Sox were also the first to misspell a players name. During a road trip to New York, Ted Kluszewski became the first player to appear in a game with his name misspelled. There was a backwards "z" and an "x" instead of the second "k" in his name.
- Nellie Fox set an American League record for most consecutive games started at second base. The streak started on August 7, 1955, and ended on September 3, 1960.
- During the American League meetings of 1960, White Sox owner Bill Veeck announced that he was interested in selling his shares in the White Sox with the intention of starting an expansion franchise in Southern California with former player Hank Greenberg. Charlie Finley had offered to buy Veeck's shares in the White Sox for $4.2 million but withdrew the offer.

=== Season standings ===
American League
Team	W	L	Pct.	GB	Home	Road
New York Yankees	97	57	.630	—	55‍–‍22	42‍–‍35
Baltimore Orioles	89	65	.578	8	44‍–‍33	45‍–‍32
Chicago White Sox	87	67	.565	10	51‍–‍26	36‍–‍41
Cleveland Indians	76	78	.494	21	39‍–‍38	37‍–‍40
Washington Senators	73	81	.474	24	32‍–‍45	41‍–‍36
Detroit Tigers	71	83	.461	26	40‍–‍37	31‍–‍46
Boston Red Sox	65	89	.422	32	36‍–‍41	29‍–‍48
Kansas City Athletics	58	96	.377	39	34‍–‍43	24‍–‍53

=== Record vs. opponents ===
1960 American League record Sources:
Team	BAL	BOS	CWS	CLE	DET	KCA	NYY	WSH
Baltimore	—	16–6	13–9	14–8	13–9	13–9	9–13	11–11
Boston	6–16	—	5–17	9–13	14–8	13–9	7–15	11–11
Chicago	9–13	17–5	—	11–11	11–11	15–7	10–12	14–8
Cleveland	8–14	13–9	11–11	—	7–15	15–7	6–16	16–6
Detroit	9–13	8–14	11–11	15–7	—	10–12	8–14	10–12
Kansas City	9–13	9–13	7–15	7–15	12–10	—	7–15–1	7–15
New York	13–9	15–7	12–10	16–6	14–8	15–7–1	—	12–10
Washington	11–11	11–11	8–14	6–16	12–10	15–7	10–12	—

=== 1960 Opening Day lineup ===
- Luis Aparicio, SS
- Nellie Fox, 2B
- Minnie Miñoso, LF
- Ted Kluszewski, 1B
- Gene Freese, 3B
- Sherm Lollar, C
- Al Smith, RF
- Jim Landis, CF
- Early Wynn, P

=== Notable transactions ===
- April 18, 1960: Barry Latman was traded by the White Sox to the Cleveland Indians for Herb Score.
- April 23, 1960: Chico Carrasquel was released by the White Sox.
- June 18, 1960: Joe Ginsberg was signed as a free agent by the White Sox.
- August 13, 1960: Don Prohovich (minors) and $15,000 were traded by the White Sox to the Milwaukee Braves for Earl Averill, Jr.

=== Roster ===
1960 Chicago White Sox
Roster
Pitchers: 38 Frank Baumann; 22 Dick Donovan; 28 Don Ferrarese; 25 Mike Garcia; 44 Russ Kemmerer; 27 Turk Lown; 15 Ken McBride; 29 Ray Moore; 23 Gary Peters; 19 Billy Pierce; 29 Bob Rush; 18 Herb Score; 35 Bob Shaw; 21 Gerry Staley; 20,31 Jake Striker; 36 Al Worthington; 24 Early Wynn	Catchers: 31 Earl Averill; 20 Dick Brown; 45 Cam Carreon; 28 Joe Ginsberg; 10 Sherm Lollar; Infielders: 11 Luis Aparicio; 14 Sammy Esposito; 2 Nellie Fox; 4 Gene Freese; 6 Billy Goodman; 8 Ted Kluszewski; 12 J. C. Martin; 26,5 Roy Sievers; 17 Earl Torgeson	Outfielders: 32 Joe Hicks; 40 Stan Johnson; 1 Jim Landis; 9 Minnie Miñoso; 7 Jim Rivera; 3 Floyd Robinson; 16 Al Smith; Other batters: 3 Jim McAnany	Manager: 42 Al López; Coaches: 37 Ray Berres; 34 Johnny Cooney; 33 Tony Cuccinello; 39 Don Gutteridge

== Player stats ==
= Indicates league leader

=== Batting ===
Note: G = Games played; AB = At bats; R = Runs scored; H = Hits; 2B = Doubles; 3B = Triples; HR = Home runs; RBI = Runs batted in; BB = Base on balls; SO = Strikeouts; AVG = Batting average; SB = Stolen bases

Player	G	AB	R	H	2B	3B	HR	RBI	BB	SO	AVG	SB
Luis Aparicio, SS	153	600	86	166	20	7	2	61	43	39	.277	51
Earl Averill, C	10	14	2	3	0	0	0	2	4	2	.214	0
Dick Brown, C	16	43	4	7	0	0	3	5	3	11	.163	0
Cam Carreon, C	8	17	2	4	0	0	0	2	1	3	.235	0
Sammy Esposito, 3B, SS, 2B	57	77	14	14	5	0	1	11	10	20	.182	0
Nellie Fox, 2B	150	605	85	175	24	10	2	59	50	13	.289	2
Gene Freese, 3B	127	455	60	124	32	6	17	79	29	65	.273	10
Joe Ginsberg, C	28	75	8	19	4	0	0	9	10	8	.253	1
Billy Goodman, 3B, 2B	30	77	5	18	4	0	0	6	12	8	.234	0
Joe Hicks, CF	36	47	3	9	1	0	0	2	6	3	.191	0
Stan Johnson, LF	5	6	1	1	0	0	1	1	0	1	.167	0
Ted Kluszewski, 1B	81	181	20	53	9	0	5	39	22	10	.293	0
Jim Landis, CF	148	494	89	125	25	6	10	49	80	84	.253	23
Sherm Lollar, C	129	421	43	106	23	0	7	46	42	39	.252	2
J. C. Martin, 3B	7	20	0	2	1	0	0	2	0	6	.100	0
Jim McAnany, PH	3	2	0	0	0	0	0	0	0	2	.000	0
Minnie Miñoso, LF, RF	154	591	89	184	32	4	20	105	52	63	.311	17
Jim Rivera, OF	48	17	17	5	0	0	1	1	3	3	.294	4
Floyd Robinson, OF	22	46	7	13	0	0	0	1	11	8	.283	2
Roy Sievers, 1B, LF	127	444	87	131	22	0	28	93	74	69	.295	1
Al Smith, RF, CF	142	536	80	169	31	3	12	72	50	65	.315	8
Earl Torgeson, 1B	68	57	12	15	2	0	2	9	21	8	.263	1

Player	G	AB	R	H	2B	3B	HR	RBI	BB	SO	AVG	SB
Frank Baumann, P	47	52	2	8	1	0	0	6	9	25	.154	0
Dick Donovan, P	33	23	3	3	1	0	0	2	1	13	.130	0
Don Ferrarese, P	5	2	1	1	0	0	0	0	0	1	.500	0
Mike Garcia, P	15	3	0	1	0	0	0	1	0	0	.333	0
Russ Kemmerer, P	36	29	1	0	0	0	0	1	2	14	.000	0
Turk Lown, P	45	5	0	1	1	0	0	0	1	0	.200	0
Ray Moore, P	14	2	0	0	0	0	0	0	0	1	.000	0
Billy Pierce, P	32	67	4	12	1	0	0	7	6	14	.179	0
Bob Rush, P	9	1	1	1	0	0	0	0	0	0	1.000	0
Herb Score, P	23	30	2	3	0	1	0	1	3	16	.100	0
Bob Shaw, P	36	58	4	8	1	0	0	2	6	12	.138	0
Gerry Staley, P	64	17	0	4	0	0	0	3	2	5	.235	0
Al Worthington, P	4	2	1	2	0	0	0	0	0	0	1.000	0
Early Wynn, P	36	75	8	15	2	1	1	7	14	17	.200	0
Team totals	154	5191	741	1402	242	38	112	684	567	648	.270	122

=== Pitching ===
Note: W = Wins; L = Losses; ERA = Earned run average; G = Games pitched; GS = Games started; SV = Saves; IP = Innings pitched; H = Hits allowed; R = Runs allowed; ER = Earned runs allowed; HR = Home runs allowed; BB = Walks allowed; K = Strikeouts

Player	W	L	ERA	G	GS	SV	IP	H	R	ER	HR	BB	K
Frank Baumann	13	6	2.67	47	20	3	185.1	169	67	55	11	61	71
Dick Donovan	6	1	5.38	33	8	3	78.2	87	49	47	13	28	30
Don Ferrarese	0	1	18.00	5	0	0	4.0	8	8	8	2	9	4
Mike Garcia	0	0	4.58	15	0	2	17.2	23	9	9	2	10	8
Russ Kemmerer	6	3	2.98	36	7	2	120.2	111	45	40	5	49	76
Turk Lown	2	3	3.88	45	0	5	67.1	60	31	29	6	40	39
Ken McBride	0	1	3.86	5	0	0	4.2	6	2	2	0	3	4
Ray Moore	1	1	5.66	14	0	0	20.2	19	13	13	5	11	3
Gary Peters	0	0	2.70	2	0	0	3.1	4	1	1	0	1	4
Billy Pierce	14	7	3.62	32	30	0	196.1	201	81	79	24	47	108
Bob Rush	0	0	5.65	9	0	0	14.1	16	10	9	4	7	12
Herb Score	5	10	3.72	23	22	0	113.2	91	54	47	10	87	78
Bob Shaw	13	13	4.06	36	32	0	192.2	221	97	87	16	65	46
Gerry Staley	13	8	2.42	64	0	10	115.1	94	40	31	8	32	52
Jake Striker	0	0	4.91	2	0	0	3.2	5	3	2	1	1	1
Al Worthington	1	1	3.38	4	0	0	5.1	3	2	2	0	4	1
Early Wynn	13	12	3.49	36	35	1	237.1	220	105	92	20	114	158
Team totals	87	67	3.60	154	154	26	1381.0	1338	617	553	127	569	695

== Farm system ==
Level	Team	League	Manager
AAA	San Diego Padres	Pacific Coast League	Catfish Metkovich and Jimmie Reese
A	Charleston White Sox	Sally League	Skeeter Scalzi, Bennie Huffman and Bob Kuzava
B	Lincoln Chiefs	Illinois–Indiana–Iowa League	Ira Hutchinson
C	Idaho Falls Russets	Pioneer League	Peanuts Lowrey and George Noga
D	Pensacola Angels	Alabama–Florida League	J. C. Dunn
D	Clinton C-Sox	Midwest League	George Noga and Frank Parenti

LEAGUE CHAMPIONS: Pensacola
