= 1960 Cleveland Indians season =

1960 Cleveland Indians
- League: American League
- Ballpark: Cleveland Municipal Stadium
- City: Cleveland, Ohio
- Record: 76–78 (.494)
- League place: 4th
- Owners: William R. Daley
- General managers: Frank Lane
- Managers: Joe Gordon, Jimmy Dykes
- Television: WEWS-TV (Ken Coleman, Bill McColgan)
- Radio: WERE (Jimmy Dudley, Bob Neal)

The 1960 Cleveland Indians season was a season in American baseball. It involved the Indians' fourth-place finish in the American League with a record of 76 wins and 78 losses, 21 games behind the AL Champion New York Yankees. This season was notable for the infamous trade of Rocky Colavito.

== Offseason ==
- December 6, 1959: Minnie Miñoso, Dick Brown, Don Ferrarese, and Jake Striker were traded by the Indians to the Chicago White Sox for Johnny Romano, Bubba Phillips, and Norm Cash.
- December 15, 1959: Billy Martin, Gordy Coleman and Cal McLish were traded by the Cleveland Indians to the Reds for Johnny Temple.
- Prior to 1960 season: Jim King was obtained by the Indians from the Toronto Maple Leafs as part of a minor league working agreement.

== Regular season ==
=== Season standings ===
American League
Team	W	L	Pct.	GB	Home	Road
New York Yankees	97	57	.630	—	55‍–‍22	42‍–‍35
Baltimore Orioles	89	65	.578	8	44‍–‍33	45‍–‍32
Chicago White Sox	87	67	.565	10	51‍–‍26	36‍–‍41
Cleveland Indians	76	78	.494	21	39‍–‍38	37‍–‍40
Washington Senators	73	81	.474	24	32‍–‍45	41‍–‍36
Detroit Tigers	71	83	.461	26	40‍–‍37	31‍–‍46
Boston Red Sox	65	89	.422	32	36‍–‍41	29‍–‍48
Kansas City Athletics	58	96	.377	39	34‍–‍43	24‍–‍53

=== Record vs. opponents ===
1960 American League record Sources:
Team	BAL	BOS	CWS	CLE	DET	KCA	NYY	WSH
Baltimore	—	16–6	13–9	14–8	13–9	13–9	9–13	11–11
Boston	6–16	—	5–17	9–13	14–8	13–9	7–15	11–11
Chicago	9–13	17–5	—	11–11	11–11	15–7	10–12	14–8
Cleveland	8–14	13–9	11–11	—	7–15	15–7	6–16	16–6
Detroit	9–13	8–14	11–11	15–7	—	10–12	8–14	10–12
Kansas City	9–13	9–13	7–15	7–15	12–10	—	7–15–1	7–15
New York	13–9	15–7	12–10	16–6	14–8	15–7–1	—	12–10
Washington	11–11	11–11	8–14	6–16	12–10	15–7	10–12	—

=== Notable transactions ===
- April 3, 1960: Al Cicotte was purchased by the Toronto Maple Leafs from the Indians.
- April 12, 1960: Norm Cash was traded by the Indians to the Detroit Tigers for Steve Demeter.
- April 17, 1960: 1959 AL home run king Rocky Colavito was traded by the Indians to the Detroit Tigers for 1959 AL batting champion Harvey Kuenn.
- April 18, 1960: Herb Score was traded by the Indians to the Chicago White Sox for Barry Latman.
- June 11, 1960: Paul Casanova was released by the Indians.
- June 13, 1960: Russ Nixon and Carroll Hardy were traded by the Indians to the Boston Red Sox for Marty Keough and Ted Bowsfield. It was he second time the Indians traded Nixon to the Red Sox in three months: a March 16 deal sent Nixon to Boston for fellow catcher Sammy White, but White retired rather than report to Cleveland and the trade was nullified March 25.
- August 3, 1960: In what was termed the first (and up to the present day, only) "trade" of managers in baseball history, Cleveland and Detroit exchanged Joe Gordon for Jimmy Dykes. In the days that followed, the two teams also "traded" coaches, as the Indians' Jo-Jo White and the Tigers' Luke Appling swapped jobs to remain aides to Gordon and Dykes.

=== Opening Day Lineup ===
Opening Day Starters
#	Name	Position
1	Johnny Temple	2B
6	Harvey Kuenn	CF
12	Walt Bond	RF
14	Tito Francona	LF
15	Russ Nixon	C
10	Vic Power	1B
3	Woodie Held	SS
7	Bubba Phillips	3B
39	Gary Bell	P

=== Roster ===
1960 Cleveland Indians
Roster
Pitchers: 39 Gary Bell; 30 Ted Bowsfield; 32,16 John Briggs; 38 Frank Funk; 33 Mudcat Grant; 26 Bob Grim; 23 Jack Harshman; 34 Wynn Hawkins; 17 Johnny Klippstein; 18 Barry Latman; 20 Mike Lee; 29 Bobby Locke; 32,30 Carl Mathias; 25 Don Newcombe; 31 Jim Perry; 22 Dick Stigman; 25 Carl Thomas; 28 Bobby Tiefenauer	Catchers: 8 Hank Foiles; 15 Russ Nixon; 11 Johnny Romano; 27 Red Wilson; Infielders: 2 Ken Aspromonte; 8 Rocky Bridges; 34,1 Mike de la Hoz; 5 Steve Demeter; 8,9 Bob Hale; 3 Woodie Held; 4 Joe Morgan; 7,5 Bubba Phillips; 10 Vic Power; 4 George Strickland; 1,16 Johnny Temple	Outfielders: 12 Walt Bond; 26 Ty Cline; 38 Don Dillard; 14 Tito Francona; 30 Carroll Hardy; 15 Marty Keough; 7,6 Harvey Kuenn; 37 Jimmy Piersall; 8 John Powers; 6,5 Chuck Tanner; 8 Pete Whisenant	Manager: 35 Joe Gordon (Apr 19–Aug 2); 40 Jo-Jo White (Aug 3–Aug 4); 35 Jimmy Dykes (Aug 5–Oct 2); Coaches: 40 Luke Appling (Third base, Aug 2–Oct 2); 41 Ed Fitz Gerald; 43 Mel Harder (Pitching); 42 Red Kress (First base); 21 Bob Lemon; 40 Jo-Jo White (Third base, Apr 19–Aug 2); 45 Ted Wilks

== Player stats ==
= Indicates team leader

=== Batting ===
==== Starters by position ====
Note: Pos = Position; G = Games played; AB = At bats; H = Hits; Avg. = Batting average; HR = Home runs; RBI = Runs batted in

Pos	Player	G	AB	H	Avg.	HR	RBI
C	Johnny Romano	108	316	86	.272	16	52
1B	Vic Power	147	580	167	.288	10	84
2B	Ken Aspromonte	117	459	133	.290	1	10
3B	Bubba Phillips	113	304	63	.207	4	33
SS	Woodie Held	109	376	97	.258	1	21
LF	Tito Francona	147	544	159	.292	17	79
CF	Jimmy Piersall	138	486	137	.282	18	66
RF	Harvey Kuenn	126	474	146	.308	9	54

==== Other batters ====
Note: G = Games played; AB = At bats; H = Hits; Avg. = Batting average; HR = Home runs; RBI = Runs batted in

Player	G	AB	H	Avg.	HR	RBI
Johnny Temple	98	381	102	.268	2	19
Mike de la Hoz	49	160	41	.256	6	23
Marty Keough	65	149	37	.248	3	11
Walt Bond	40	131	29	.221	5	18
Red Wilson	32	88	19	.216	1	10
Russ Nixon	25	82	20	.244	1	6
Bob Hale	70	70	21	.300	0	12
Hank Foiles	24	68	19	.279	1	6
Joe Morgan	22	47	14	.298	2	4
George Strickland	32	42	7	.167	1	3
Rocky Bridges	10	27	9	.333	0	3
Ty Cline	7	26	8	.308	0	2
Chuck Tanner	21	25	7	.280	0	4
Carroll Hardy	29	18	2	.111	0	1
John Powers	8	12	2	.167	0	0
Don Dillard	6	7	1	.143	0	0
Pete Whisenant	7	6	1	.167	0	0
Steve Demeter	4	5	0	.000	0	0

=== Pitching ===
==== Starting pitchers ====
Note: G = Games pitched; IP = Innings pitched; W = Wins; L = Losses; ERA = Earned run average; SO = Strikeouts

Player	G	IP	W	L	ERA	SO
Jim Perry	36	261.1	18	10	3.62	120
Gary Bell	23	154.2	9	10	4.13	109

==== Other pitchers ====
Note: G = Games pitched; IP = Innings pitched; W = Wins; L = Losses; ERA = Earned run average; SO = Strikeouts

Player	G	IP	W	L	ERA	SO
Mudcat Grant	33	159.2	9	8	4.40	75
Barry Latman	31	147.1	7	7	4.03	44
Dick Stigman	41	133.2	5	11	4.51	104
Bobby Locke	32	123.0	3	5	3.37	53
Wynn Hawkins	15	66.0	4	4	4.23	39
Jack Harshman	15	54.1	2	4	3.98	25
Ted Bowsfield	11	40.2	3	4	5.09	14

==== Relief pitchers ====
Note: G = Games pitched; W = Wins; L = Losses; SV = Saves; ERA = Earned run average; SO = Strikeouts

Player	G	W	L	SV	ERA	SO
Johnny Klippstein	49	5	5	14	2.91	46
John Briggs	21	4	2	1	4.46	19
Don Newcombe	20	2	3	1	4.33	27
Frank Funk	9	4	2	1	1.99	18
Carl Mathias	7	0	1	0	3.52	13
Mike Lee	7	0	0	0	2.00	6
Bobby Tiefenauer	6	0	1	0	2.00	2
Carl Thomas	4	1	0	0	7.45	5
Bob Grim	3	0	1	0	11.57	2

== Farm system ==
Level	Team	League	Manager
AAA	Toronto Maple Leafs	International League	Mel McGaha
AA	Mobile Bears	Southern Association	Al Hollingsworth and Johnny Lipon
A	Reading Indians	Eastern League	Ray Mueller
B	Burlington Indians	Carolina League	Pinky May
C	Minot Mallards	Northern League	Walt Novick
D	Selma Cloverleafs	Alabama–Florida League	Ken Landenberger and Paul O'Dea
D	Lakeland Indians	Florida State League	Johnny Lipon and Charlie Gassaway

LEAGUE CHAMPIONS: Toronto
