= 1960 Washington Senators season =

1960 Washington Senators
- League: American League
- Ballpark: Griffith Stadium
- City: Washington, D.C.
- Record: 73–81 (.474)
- League place: 5th
- Owners: Calvin Griffith (majority owner, with Thelma Griffith Haynes)
- General managers: Calvin Griffith
- Managers: Cookie Lavagetto
- Television: WTOP, Ch. 9
- Radio: WTOP-AM 1500 (Chuck Thompson, Bob Wolff, Dan Daniels)

The 1960 Washington Senators won 73 games, lost 81, and finished in fifth place in the American League. They were managed by Cookie Lavagetto and played home games at Griffith Stadium, where they drew 743,404 fans in 1960, last in the eight-team league but an increase of almost 25 percent over 1959. This was the "original" Senators' 60th and final season in Washington, as they moved to Minnesota and became the Twins in 1961, which they have been named ever since. Griffith Stadium was demolished after the second Washington Senators franchise played its inaugural season there.

== Regular season ==
=== Season standings ===
American League
Team	W	L	Pct.	GB	Home	Road
New York Yankees	97	57	.630	—	55‍–‍22	42‍–‍35
Baltimore Orioles	89	65	.578	8	44‍–‍33	45‍–‍32
Chicago White Sox	87	67	.565	10	51‍–‍26	36‍–‍41
Cleveland Indians	76	78	.494	21	39‍–‍38	37‍–‍40
Washington Senators	73	81	.474	24	32‍–‍45	41‍–‍36
Detroit Tigers	71	83	.461	26	40‍–‍37	31‍–‍46
Boston Red Sox	65	89	.422	32	36‍–‍41	29‍–‍48
Kansas City Athletics	58	96	.377	39	34‍–‍43	24‍–‍53

=== Record vs. opponents ===
1960 American League record Sources:
Team	BAL	BOS	CWS	CLE	DET	KCA	NYY	WSH
Baltimore	—	16–6	13–9	14–8	13–9	13–9	9–13	11–11
Boston	6–16	—	5–17	9–13	14–8	13–9	7–15	11–11
Chicago	9–13	17–5	—	11–11	11–11	15–7	10–12	14–8
Cleveland	8–14	13–9	11–11	—	7–15	15–7	6–16	16–6
Detroit	9–13	8–14	11–11	15–7	—	10–12	8–14	10–12
Kansas City	9–13	9–13	7–15	7–15	12–10	—	7–15–1	7–15
New York	13–9	15–7	12–10	16–6	14–8	15–7–1	—	12–10
Washington	11–11	11–11	8–14	6–16	12–10	15–7	10–12	—

=== Relocation to Minnesota ===
After an early flirtation with San Francisco, by 1957 team owner Calvin Griffith was courting Minneapolis-St. Paul, a prolonged process that resulted in him rejecting the Twin Cities' first offer before agreeing to relocate. The American League opposed the move at first, but in 1960 a deal was reached: The Senators would move and would be replaced with an expansion Senators team for 1961. The existing Senators franchise became the Minnesota Twins.

=== Roster ===
1960 Washington Senators
Roster
Pitchers: 11 Ted Abernathy; 12 Tex Clevenger; 18 Bill Fischer; 11 Rudy Hernández; 35 Dick Hyde; 21,36 Jim Kaat; 16 Russ Kemmerer; 15 Jack Kralick; 20 Don Lee; 39 Héctor Maestri; 21 Ray Moore; 18 Tom Morgan; 17 Camilo Pascual; 28,14 Pedro Ramos; 35 Ted Sadowski; 27 Chuck Stobbs; 19 Hal Woodeshick	Catchers: 14,10 Earl Battey; 8 Hal Naragon; Infielders: 29 Julio Bécquer; 1 Reno Bertoia; 6 Billy Consolo; 9 Billy Gardner; 3 Harmon Killebrew; 32,28 Don Mincher; 37 Johnny Schaive; 5 José Valdivielso; 25 Zoilo Versalles	Outfielders: 26 Bob Allison; 22 Dan Dobbek; 7 Lenny Green; 23 Jim Lemon; 30 Faye Throneberry; 32 Elmer Valo; 16 Pete Whisenant; Other batters: 4 Ken Aspromonte; 4 Jake Jacobs	Manager: 51 Cookie Lavagetto; Coaches: 53 Ellis Clary; 55 Clyde McCullough; 54 Sam Mele; 52 Bob Swift

== Game log ==
=== Regular season ===
Legend
	Senators win
	Senators loss
	Postponement
	Eliminated from playoff spot
**Bold**	Senators team member

1960 game log: 73–81 (Home: 32–45; Away: 41–36)
April: 5–6 (Home: 2–4; Away: 3–2)

#	Date	(ET)	Opponent	Score	Win	Loss	Save	Time of Game	Attendance	Record	Streak
10	April 27		@ Yankees	5–4				2:17	3,745	5–5	W1

May: 9–17 (Home: 2–4; Away: 3–2)

#	Date	(ET)	Opponent	Score	Win	Loss	Save	Time of Game	Attendance	Record	Streak

June: 16–12 (Home: 6–5; Away: 10–7)

#	Date	(ET)	Opponent	Score	Win	Loss	Save	Time of Game	Attendance	Record	Streak

July: 16–13 (Home: 7–9; Away: 9–4)

#	Date	(ET)	Opponent	Score	Win	Loss	Save	Time of Game	Attendance	Record	Streak
—	July 11	3:00 p.m. EDT	28th All-Star Game	National League vs. American League (Municipal Stadium, Kansas City, Missouri)							
—	July 13	1:00 p.m. EDT	29th All-Star Game	National League vs. American League (Yankee Stadium, Bronx, New York)							

August: 18–15 (Home: 9–8; Away: 9–6)

#	Date	(ET)	Opponent	Score	Win	Loss	Save	Time of Game	Attendance	Record	Streak

September: 9–16 (Home: 3–8; Away: 6–8)

#	Date	(ET)	Opponent	Score	Win	Loss	Save	Time of Game	Attendance	Record	Streak

October: 0–2 (Home: 0–2; Away: 0–0)

#	Date	(ET)	Opponent	Score	Win	Loss	Save	Time of Game	Attendance	Record	Streak

=== Detailed records ===
**American League**
Opponent	Home	Away	Total	Pct.	Runs scored	Runs allowed
Baltimore Orioles
Boston Red Sox
Chicago White Sox
Cleveland Indians
Detroit Tigers
Kansas City Athletics
New York Yankees	5–6	5–6	10–12	.455	86	105
**Washington Senators**	—	—	—	—	—	—
	**5–6**	**5–6**	**10–12**	**.455**	**86**	**105**

== Player stats ==
=== Batting ===
==== Starters by position ====
Note: Pos = Position; G = Games played; AB = At bats; H = Hits; Avg. = Batting average; HR = Home runs; RBI = Runs batted in

Pos	Player	G	AB	H	Avg.	HR	RBI
C	Earl Battey	137	466	126	.270	15	60
1B	Harmon Killebrew	124	442	122	.276	31	80
2B	Billy Gardner	145	592	152	.257	9	56
3B	Reno Bertoia	121	460	122	.265	4	45
SS	José Valdivielso	117	268	57	.213	2	19
LF	Jim Lemon	148	528	142	.269	38	100
CF	Lenny Green	127	330	97	.294	5	33
RF	Bob Allison	144	501	126	.251	15	69

==== Other batters ====
Note: G = Games played; AB = At bats; H = Hits; Avg. = Batting average; HR = Home runs; RBI = Runs batted in

Player	G	AB	H	Avg.	HR	RBI
Julio Bécquer	110	298	75	.252	4	35
Dan Dobbek	110	248	54	.218	10	30
Billy Consolo	100	174	36	.207	3	15
Faye Throneberry	85	157	39	.248	1	23
Pete Whisenant	58	115	26	.226	3	9
Hal Naragon	33	92	19	.207	0	5
Don Mincher	27	79	19	.241	2	5
Elmer Valo	76	64	18	.281	0	16
Zoilo Versalles	15	45	6	.133	0	4
Johnny Schaive	6	12	3	.250	0	0
Ken Aspromonte	4	3	0	.000	0	0
Jake Jacobs	6	2	0	.000	0	0

=== Pitching ===
==== Starting pitchers ====
Note: G = Games pitched; IP = Innings pitched; W = Wins; L = Losses; ERA = Earned run average; SO = Strikeouts

Player	G	IP	W	L	ERA	SO
Pedro Ramos	43	274.0	11	18	3.45	160
Camilo Pascual	26	151.2	12	8	3.03	143
Russ Kemmerer	3	17.1	0	2	7.79	10

==== Other pitchers ====
Note: G = Games pitched; IP = Innings pitched; W = Wins; L = Losses; ERA = Earned run average; SO = Strikeouts

Player	G	IP	W	L	ERA	SO
Don Lee	44	165.0	8	7	3.44	88
Jack Kralick	35	151.0	8	6	3.04	71
Tex Clevenger	53	128.2	5	11	4.20	49
Chuck Stobbs	40	119.1	12	7	3.32	72
Hal Woodeshick	41	115.0	4	5	4.70	46
Bill Fischer	20	77.0	3	5	4.91	31
Jim Kaat	13	50.0	1	5	5.58	25
Ted Sadowski	9	17.1	0	2	5.19	12

==== Relief pitchers ====
Note: G = Games pitched; W = Wins; L = Losses; SV = Saves; ERA = Earned run average; SO = Strikeouts

Player	G	IP	W	L	SV	ERA	SO
Ray Moore	37	65.2	3	2	13	2.88	29
Rudy Hernández	21	34.2	4	1	0	4.41	22
Tom Morgan	14	24.0	1	3	0	3.75	11
Dick Hyde	9	8.2	0	1	0	4.15	4
Ted Abernathy	2	3.0	0	0	0	12.00	1
Héctor Maestri	1	2.0	0	0	0	0.00	1
Julio Bécquer	1	1.0	0	0	0	9.00	0

== Farm system ==
Level	Team	League	Manager
AAA	Charleston Senators	American Association	Del Wilber
A	Charlotte Hornets	Sally League	Gene Verble
B	Wilson Tobs	Carolina League	Jack McKeon
D	Fort Walton Beach Jets	Alabama–Florida League	Ralph Rowe
D	Wytheville Senators	Appalachian League	Red Norwood
D	Erie Senators	New York–Penn League	Harry Warner

LEAGUE CHAMPIONS: Wytheville
