= 1960 Boston Red Sox season =

Major League Baseball season

1960 Boston Red Sox
- League: American League
- Ballpark: Fenway Park
- City: Boston, Massachusetts
- Record: 65–89 (.422)
- League place: 7th
- Owners: Tom Yawkey
- President: Tom Yawkey
- General managers: Bucky Harris
- Managers: Billy Jurges (15–27); Del Baker (2–5); Pinky Higgins (48–57)
- Television: WHDH-TV, Ch. 5
- Radio: WHDH-AM 850 (Curt Gowdy, Bill Crowley, Art Gleeson)
- Stats: ESPN.com; Baseball Reference

The 1960 Boston Red Sox season was the 60th season in the franchise's Major League Baseball history. The Red Sox finished seventh in the American League (AL) with a record of 65 wins and 89 losses, 32 games behind the AL champion New York Yankees.

== Regular season ==
- June 7, 1960: Manager Billy Jurges was fired with Boston in eighth and last place. After interim skipper Del Baker handled the Bosox for seven games, Jurges was replaced by Mike "Pinky" Higgins (his predecessor) on June 14.
- September 28, 1960:
  - Ted Williams retired at the end of the Red Sox' home season. In his final at bat, Williams hit the 521st home run of his career. Williams finished the season with a .316 batting average at the age of 42. He did not play in Boston's three-game season finale at Yankee Stadium the ensuing weekend.
  - The Red Sox made two significant front office changes. They fired second-year general manager Bucky Harris after the club's final home game on September 28, and signed Higgins to a three-year contract as field manager and director of player personnel. Business manager Dick O'Connell was promoted to executive vice president, as the Red Sox temporarily abolished the title of general manager. They also replaced Johnny Murphy, director of minor league operations and scouting since 1948, with Neil Mahoney, who had been chief Eastern scout.

=== Season standings ===
American League
Team	W	L	Pct.	GB	Home	Road
New York Yankees	97	57	.630	—	55‍–‍22	42‍–‍35
Baltimore Orioles	89	65	.578	8	44‍–‍33	45‍–‍32
Chicago White Sox	87	67	.565	10	51‍–‍26	36‍–‍41
Cleveland Indians	76	78	.494	21	39‍–‍38	37‍–‍40
Washington Senators	73	81	.474	24	32‍–‍45	41‍–‍36
Detroit Tigers	71	83	.461	26	40‍–‍37	31‍–‍46
Boston Red Sox	65	89	.422	32	36‍–‍41	29‍–‍48
Kansas City Athletics	58	96	.377	39	34‍–‍43	24‍–‍53

=== Record vs. opponents ===
1960 American League record Sources:
Team	BAL	BOS	CWS	CLE	DET	KCA	NYY	WSH
Baltimore	—	16–6	13–9	14–8	13–9	13–9	9–13	11–11
Boston	6–16	—	5–17	9–13	14–8	13–9	7–15	11–11
Chicago	9–13	17–5	—	11–11	11–11	15–7	10–12	14–8
Cleveland	8–14	13–9	11–11	—	7–15	15–7	6–16	16–6
Detroit	9–13	8–14	11–11	15–7	—	10–12	8–14	10–12
Kansas City	9–13	9–13	7–15	7–15	12–10	—	7–15–1	7–15
New York	13–9	15–7	12–10	16–6	14–8	15–7–1	—	12–10
Washington	11–11	11–11	8–14	6–16	12–10	15–7	10–12	—

=== Notable transactions ===
- March 16, 1960: Sammy White and Jim Marshall were traded by the Red Sox to the Cleveland Indians for Russ Nixon. White refused to report and went on the voluntarily retired list, cancelling the trade with the players returning to their original clubs.
- May 6, 1960: Nelson Chittum was traded by the Red Sox to the Los Angeles Dodgers for Rip Repulski.
- May 17, 1960: Ron Jackson was traded by the Red Sox to the Milwaukee Braves for Ray Boone.
- June 13, 1960: Marty Keough and Ted Bowsfield were traded by the Red Sox to the Cleveland Indians for Russ Nixon and Carroll Hardy. The trade marked the second time in three months that Boston had obtained Nixon (see March 16, above).
- September 14, 1960: Ray Boone was released by the Red Sox.

=== Opening Day lineup ===
12	Pumpsie Green	2B
3	Pete Runnels	1B
11	Frank Malzone	3B
10	Gene Stephens	RF
9	Ted Williams	LF
37	Gary Geiger	CF
1	Don Buddin	SS
30	Haywood Sullivan	C
15	Tom Sturdivant	P

=== Roster ===
1960 Boston Red Sox
Roster
Pitchers: 21 Tom Borland; 29 Ted Bowsfield; 23 Tom Brewer; 19 Jerry Casale; 28 Nelson Chittum; 14 Ike Delock; 21 Arnold Earley; 20 Mike Fornieles; 17 Dave Hillman; 27 Bill Monbouquette; 36 Billy Muffett; 31 Chet Nichols Jr.; 39 Tracy Stallard; 15 Tom Sturdivant; 18 Frank Sullivan; 25 Ted Wills; 26 Earl Wilson; 39 Al Worthington	Catchers: 38 Don Gile; 22 Russ Nixon; 29 Jim Pagliaroni; 8 Ed Sadowski; 30 Haywood Sullivan; Infielders: 39 Ray Boone; 1 Don Buddin; 2 Marlan Coughtry; 12 Pumpsie Green; 5 Ron Jackson; 11 Frank Malzone; 3 Pete Runnels; 31 Ray Webster; 6 Vic Wertz	Outfielders: 7 Jim Busby; 4 Lou Clinton; 37, 7 Gary Geiger; 16 Carroll Hardy; 2 Marty Keough; 28 Rip Repulski; 10 Gene Stephens; 10 Willie Tasby; 25 Bobby Thomson; 9 Ted Williams	Managers: 32 Del Baker; 5 Pinky Higgins; 16 Billy Jurges; Coaches: 32 Del Baker (Bench); 35 Billy Herman (Third base); 33 Sal Maglie (Pitching); 34 Rudy York (First base & Hitting)

== Player stats ==
= Indicates team leader

= Indicates league leader

=== Batting ===
==== Starters by position ====
Note: Pos = Position; G = Games played; AB = At bats; H = Hits; Avg. = Batting average; HR = Home runs; RBI = Runs batted in

Pos	Player	G	AB	H	Avg.	HR	RBI
C	Russ Nixon	80	272	81	.298	5	33
1B	Vic Wertz	131	443	125	.282	19	103
2B	Pete Runnels	143	528	169	.320	2	35
3B	Frank Malzone	152	595	161	.271	14	79
SS	Don Buddin	124	428	105	.245	6	36
LF	Ted Williams	113	310	98	.316	29	72
CF	Willie Tasby	105	385	108	.281	7	37
RF	Lou Clinton	96	298	68	.228	6	37

==== Other batters ====
Note: G = Games played; AB = At bats; H = Hits; Avg. = Batting average; HR = Home runs; RBI = Runs batted in

Player	G	AB	H	Avg.	HR	RBI
Pumpsie Green	133	260	63	.242	3	21
Gary Geiger	77	245	74	.302	9	33
Carroll Hardy	73	145	34	.234	2	15
Rip Repulski	73	136	33	.243	3	20
Haywood Sullivan	52	124	20	.161	3	10
Bobby Thomson	40	114	30	.263	5	20
Gene Stephens	35	109	25	.229	2	11
Marty Keough	38	105	26	.248	1	9
Ed Sadowski	38	93	20	.215	3	8
Ray Boone	34	78	16	.205	1	11
Jim Pagliaroni	28	62	19	.306	2	9
Don Gile	29	51	9	.176	1	4
Ron Jackson	10	31	7	.226	0	0
Marlan Coughtry	15	19	3	.158	0	0
Ray Webster	7	3	0	.000	0	1
Jim Busby	1	0	0	----	0	0

=== Pitching ===
==== Starting pitchers ====
Note: G = Games pitched; IP = Innings pitched; W = Wins; L = Losses; ERA = Earned run average; SO = Strikeouts

Player	G	IP	W	L	ERA	SO
Bill Monbouquette	35	215.0	14	11	3.64	134
Tom Brewer	34	186.2	10	15	4.82	60
Ike Delock	24	129.1	9	10	4.73	49
Billy Muffett	23	125.0	6	4	3.24	75
Earl Wilson	13	65.0	3	2	4.71	40

==== Other pitchers ====
Note: G = Games pitched; IP = Innings pitched; W = Wins; L = Losses; ERA = Earned run average; SO = Strikeouts

Player	G	IP	W	L	ERA	SO
Frank Sullivan	40	153.2	6	16	5.10	98
Jerry Casale	29	96.1	2	9	6.17	54
Dave Hillman	16	36.2	0	3	5.65	14
Chet Nichols Jr.	6	12.2	0	2	4.26	11

==== Relief pitchers ====
Note: G = Games pitched; W = Wins; L = Losses; SV = Saves; ERA = Earned run average; SO = Strikeouts

Player	G	W	L	SV	ERA	SO
Mike Fornieles	70	10	5	13	2.64	64
Tom Sturdivant	40	3	3	1	4.97	67
Tom Borland	26	0	4	3	6.53	32
Ted Bowsfield	17	1	2	2	5.14	18
Ted Wills	15	1	1	1	7.42	28
Al Worthington	6	0	1	0	7.71	7
Nelson Chittum	6	0	0	0	4.32	5
Tracy Stallard	4	0	0	0	0.00	6
Arnold Earley	2	0	1	0	15.75	5

== Farm system ==
Level	Team	League	Manager
AAA	Minneapolis Millers	American Association	Eddie Popowski
A	Allentown Red Sox	Eastern League	Sheriff Robinson
B	Raleigh Capitals	Carolina League	Ken Deal
D	Waterloo Hawks	Midwest League	Matt Sczesny
D	Corning Red Sox	New York–Penn League	Len Okrie
D	Alpine Cowboys	Sophomore League	Dick Kinaman

LEAGUE CHAMPIONS: Waterloo
