= 1960 Kansas City Athletics season =

1960 Kansas City Athletics
- League: American League
- Ballpark: Municipal Stadium
- City: Kansas City, Missouri
- Record: 58–96 (.377)
- League place: 8th
- Owners: Estate of Arnold Johnson
- General managers: Parke Carroll
- Managers: Bob Elliott
- Television: WDAF-TV
- Radio: WDAF (Merle Harmon, Bill Grigsby)

The 1960 Kansas City Athletics season was the sixth in Kansas City and the 60th overall. It involved the A's finishing last place in the American League's final season as an eight team circuit. Kansas City recorded 58 wins and 96 losses, 39 games behind the AL Champion New York Yankees.

== Offseason ==
At the 1959 Winter Meetings, Pittsburgh Pirates General Manager Joe L. Brown had agreed to trade Dick Groat to the Kansas City Athletics in exchange for Roger Maris. Pirates' manager Danny Murtaugh had advised Brown that he did not want to lose Groat, and the deal was never finalized. Maris was traded to the New York Yankees on December 11.

On March 10, 1960, owner Arnold Johnson died at the age of 53. After the 1960 season, the team would be sold by Johnson's estate to businessman Charlie Finley.

=== Notable transactions ===
- November 21, 1959: Frank House was traded by the Athletics to the Cincinnati Redlegs for Tom Acker.
- December 11, 1959: Roger Maris, Joe DeMaestri and Kent Hadley were traded by the Athletics to the New York Yankees for Don Larsen, Hank Bauer, Norm Siebern, and Marv Throneberry.

== Regular season ==
=== Season standings ===
American League
Team	W	L	Pct.	GB	Home	Road
New York Yankees	97	57	.630	—	55‍–‍22	42‍–‍35
Baltimore Orioles	89	65	.578	8	44‍–‍33	45‍–‍32
Chicago White Sox	87	67	.565	10	51‍–‍26	36‍–‍41
Cleveland Indians	76	78	.494	21	39‍–‍38	37‍–‍40
Washington Senators	73	81	.474	24	32‍–‍45	41‍–‍36
Detroit Tigers	71	83	.461	26	40‍–‍37	31‍–‍46
Boston Red Sox	65	89	.422	32	36‍–‍41	29‍–‍48
Kansas City Athletics	58	96	.377	39	34‍–‍43	24‍–‍53

=== Record vs. opponents ===
1960 American League record Sources:
Team	BAL	BOS	CWS	CLE	DET	KCA	NYY	WSH
Baltimore	—	16–6	13–9	14–8	13–9	13–9	9–13	11–11
Boston	6–16	—	5–17	9–13	14–8	13–9	7–15	11–11
Chicago	9–13	17–5	—	11–11	11–11	15–7	10–12	14–8
Cleveland	8–14	13–9	11–11	—	7–15	15–7	6–16	16–6
Detroit	9–13	8–14	11–11	15–7	—	10–12	8–14	10–12
Kansas City	9–13	9–13	7–15	7–15	12–10	—	7–15–1	7–15
New York	13–9	15–7	12–10	16–6	14–8	15–7–1	—	12–10
Washington	11–11	11–11	8–14	6–16	12–10	15–7	10–12	—

=== Notable transactions ===
- May 19, 1960: Bob Cerv was traded by the Athletics to the New York Yankees for Andy Carey.
- July 26, 1960: Harry Chiti was purchased from the Athletics by the Detroit Tigers.

=== Roster ===
1960 Kansas City Athletics
Roster
Pitchers: 27 Ray Blemker; 27 John Briggs; 27 George Brunet; 28 Bud Daley; 15 Bob Davis; 31 Ned Garver; 27 Bob Giggie; 24 Dick Hall; 38 Ray Herbert; 17 Ken Johnson; 32,34 Leo Kiely; 26 Johnny Kucks; 36 Marty Kutyna; 18 Don Larsen; 16 Howie Reed; 37 Bob Trowbridge; 20 John Tsitouris; 45 Dave Wickersham	Catchers: 8 Harry Chiti; 10 Pete Daley; 12 Hank Foiles; 12 Danny Kravitz; Infielders: 47 Chet Boak; 1 Andy Carey; 2 Ken Hamlin; 4 Ray Jablonski; 5 Bob Johnson; 4 Lou Klimchock; 11 Jerry Lumpe; 48 Jim McManus; 1 Wayne Terwilliger; 3 Marv Throneberry; 23 Dick Williams	Outfielders: 9 Hank Bauer; 33 Bob Cerv; 6 Jim Delsing; 6 Whitey Herzog; 37 Leo Posada; 7 Norm Siebern; 14 Russ Snyder; 13 Bill Tuttle	Manager: 30 Bob Elliott; Coaches: 40 Walker Cooper (First base); 42 Fred Fitzsimmons (Pitching); 39 Don Heffner (Third base)

== Player stats ==
= Indicates team leader

=== Batting ===
==== Starters by position ====
Note: Pos = Position; G = Games played; AB = At bats; R = Runs scored; H = Hits; Avg. = Batting average; HR = Home runs; RBI = Runs batted in

Pos	Player	G	AB	R	H	Avg.	HR	RBI
C	Pete Daley	73	228	19	60	.263	5	25
1B	Marv Throneberry	104	236	29	59	.250	11	41
2B	Jerry Lumpe	146	574	69	156	.272	8	53
3B	Andy Carey	102	343	30	80	.233	12	53
SS	Ken Hamlin	140	428	51	96	.224	2	24
LF	Norm Siebern	144	520	69	145	.279	19	69
CF	Bill Tuttle	151	559	75	143	.256	8	40
RF	Hank Bauer	95	255	30	70	.275	3	31

==== Other batters ====
Note: G = Games played; AB = At bats; R = Runs scored; H = Hits; Avg. = Batting average; HR = Home runs; RBI = Runs batted in

Player	G	AB	R	H	Avg.	HR	RBI
Dick Williams	127	420	47	121	.288	12	65
Russ Snyder	125	304	45	79	.260	4	26
Whitey Herzog	83	252	43	67	.266	8	38
Harry Chiti	58	190	16	42	.221	5	28
Danny Kravitz	59	175	17	41	.234	4	14
Bob Johnson	76	146	12	30	.205	1	9
Bob Cerv	23	78	14	20	.256	6	12
Jim Delsing	16	40	2	10	.250	0	5
Leo Posada	10	36	8	13	.361	1	2
Ray Jablonski	21	32	3	7	.219	0	3
Chet Boak	5	13	1	2	.154	0	1
Jim McManus	5	13	3	4	.308	1	2
Lou Klimchock	10	10	0	3	.300	0	0
Hank Foiles	6	7	1	4	.571	0	1
Wayne Terwilliger	2	1	0	0	.000	0	0

=== Pitching ===
==== Starting pitchers ====
Note: G = Games pitched; IP = Innings pitched; W = Wins; L = Losses; ERA = Earned run average; SO = Strikeouts

Player	G	IP	W	L	ERA	SO
Ray Herbert	37	252.2	14	15	3.28	122
Bud Daley	37	231.0	16	16	4.56	126
Dick Hall	29	182.1	8	13	4.05	79

==== Other pitchers ====
Note: G = Games pitched; IP = Innings pitched; W = Wins; L = Losses; ERA = Earned run average; SO = Strikeouts

Player	G	IP	W	L	ERA	SO
Ned Garver	28	122.1	4	9	3.83	50
Johnny Kucks	31	114.0	4	10	6.00	38
Don Larsen	22	83.2	1	10	5.38	43
John Tsitouris	14	33.0	0	2	6.55	12
George Brunet	3	10.1	0	2	4.35	4

==== Relief pitchers ====
Note: G = Games pitched; W = Wins; L = Losses; SV = Saves; ERA = Earned run average; SO = Strikeouts

Player	G	W	L	SV	ERA	SO
Marty Kutyna	51	3	2	4	3.94	20
Ken Johnson	42	5	10	3	4.26	83
Bob Trowbridge	22	1	3	2	4.61	33
Bob Davis	21	0	0	1	3.66	28
Leo Kiely	20	1	2	1	1.74	6
Bob Giggie	10	1	0	0	5.79	8
John Briggs	8	0	2	0	12.71	8
Dave Wickersham	5	0	0	2	1.08	3
Ray Blemker	1	0	0	0	27.00	0
Howie Reed	1	0	0	0	0.00	1

== Farm system ==
Level	Team	League	Manager
AAA	Dallas-Fort Worth Rangers	American Association	Jim Fanning
AA	Shreveport Sports	Southern Association	Les Peden
B	Sioux City Soos	Illinois–Indiana–Iowa League	Bobby Hofman
B	Lewiston Broncos	Northwest League	John McNamara
C	Visalia Athletics	California League	Billy Capps, Art Mazmanian and Bill Robertson
D	Sanford Greyhounds	Florida State League	Bill Robertson, Jack Sanford and Lloyd Brown
D	Albuquerque Dukes	Sophomore League	Bert Thiel
