= 1960 Baltimore Orioles season =

Major League Baseball season

1960 Baltimore Orioles
- League: American League
- Ballpark: Memorial Stadium
- City: Baltimore, Maryland
- Record: 89–65 (.578)
- League place: 2nd
- Owners: Joseph A.W. Iglehart (Chairman of the Board & Principal Owner)
- General managers: Lee MacPhail
- Managers: Paul Richards
- Television: WJZ-TV
- Radio: WBAL (AM) (Bob Murphy, Herb Carneal, Joe Crognan)

The 1960 Baltimore Orioles season involved the Orioles finishing second in the American League with a record of 89 wins and 65 losses, eight games behind the AL Champion New York Yankees, it was their first winning season since moving to Baltimore in 1954 and their first winning record since 1945 when they were still known as the St Louis Browns.

== Offseason ==
- November 30, 1959: Billy Loes and Billy O'Dell were traded by the Orioles to the San Francisco Giants for Jackie Brandt, Gordon Jones, and Roger McCardell.
- December 2, 1959: Bob Nieman was traded by the Orioles to the St. Louis Cardinals for Gene Green and Charles Staniland (minors).
- December 23, 1959: Chico Carrasquel was released by the Orioles.

== Regular season ==
=== Season standings ===
American League
Team	W	L	Pct.	GB	Home	Road
New York Yankees	97	57	.630	—	55‍–‍22	42‍–‍35
Baltimore Orioles	89	65	.578	8	44‍–‍33	45‍–‍32
Chicago White Sox	87	67	.565	10	51‍–‍26	36‍–‍41
Cleveland Indians	76	78	.494	21	39‍–‍38	37‍–‍40
Washington Senators	73	81	.474	24	32‍–‍45	41‍–‍36
Detroit Tigers	71	83	.461	26	40‍–‍37	31‍–‍46
Boston Red Sox	65	89	.422	32	36‍–‍41	29‍–‍48
Kansas City Athletics	58	96	.377	39	34‍–‍43	24‍–‍53

=== Record vs. opponents ===
1960 American League record Sources:
Team	BAL	BOS	CWS	CLE	DET	KCA	NYY	WSH
Baltimore	—	16–6	13–9	14–8	13–9	13–9	9–13	11–11
Boston	6–16	—	5–17	9–13	14–8	13–9	7–15	11–11
Chicago	9–13	17–5	—	11–11	11–11	15–7	10–12	14–8
Cleveland	8–14	13–9	11–11	—	7–15	15–7	6–16	16–6
Detroit	9–13	8–14	11–11	15–7	—	10–12	8–14	10–12
Kansas City	9–13	9–13	7–15	7–15	12–10	—	7–15–1	7–15
New York	13–9	15–7	12–10	16–6	14–8	15–7–1	—	12–10
Washington	11–11	11–11	8–14	6–16	12–10	15–7	10–12	—

=== Opening Day starters ===
- Jackie Brandt
- Marv Breeding
- Jim Gentile
- Ron Hansen
- John Powers
- Brooks Robinson
- Gus Triandos
- Jerry Walker
- Gene Woodling

=== Notable transactions ===
- April 18, 1960: Joe Ginsberg was signed as a free agent by the Orioles.
- May 12, 1960: John Powers was acquired by the Cleveland Indians off waivers from the Orioles.
- June 9, 1960: Gene Stephens was acquired by the Orioles from the Boston Red Sox in exchange for Willie Tasby.
- June 15, 1960: Joe Ginsberg was released by the Orioles.
- June 30, 1960: Jim Busby was signed as a free agent by the Orioles.
- July 4, 1960: Bobby Thomson was signed by the Orioles as a free agent.
- September 1, 1960: Dave Philley was purchased by the Orioles from the San Francisco Giants.
- September 7, 1960: Del Rice was acquired by the Orioles off waivers from the St. Louis Cardinals.

=== Roster ===
1960 Baltimore Orioles
Roster
Pitchers: 18 John Anderson; 29,59 Steve Barber; 28 Hal Brown; 35 Rip Coleman; 23 Chuck Estrada; 48 Jack Fisher; 20 Billy Hoeft; 19 Gordon Jones; 30 Bob Mabe; 32 Milt Pappas; 24 Arnie Portocarrero; 18 Wes Stock; 38 Jerry Walker; 15 Hoyt Wilhelm	Catchers: 10 Clint Courtney; 22 Joe Ginsberg; 37 Del Rice; 41 Valmy Thomas; 11 Gus Triandos; Infielders: 7 Jerry Adair; 9 Bob Boyd; 16,1 Marv Breeding; 17 Walt Dropo; 4 Jim Gentile; 3 Ron Hansen; 6 Billy Klaus; 5 Brooks Robinson	Outfielders: 44 Ray Barker; 7,25 Jackie Brandt; 16 Jim Busby; 36 Gene Green; 33 Dave Nicholson; 21 Albie Pearson; 22 Dave Philley; 2 Al Pilarcik; 20 John Powers; 8 Gene Stephens; 44 Willie Tasby; 35 Bobby Thomson; 14 Gene Woodling; Other batters: 40 Barry Shetrone	Manager: 12 Paul Richards; Coaches: 45 Jimmy Adair; 31 Harry Brecheen; 26 Lum Harris

== Player stats ==
= Indicates team leader

= Indicates league leader

=== Batting ===
==== Starters by position ====
Note: Pos = Position; G = Games played; AB = At bats; H = Hits; Avg. = Batting average; HR = Home runs; RBI = Runs batted in

Pos	Player	G	AB	H	Avg.	HR	RBI
C	Gus Triandos	109	364	98	.269	12	54
1B	Jim Gentile	138	384	112	.292	21	98
2B	Marv Breeding	152	551	147	.267	3	43
3B	Brooks Robinson	152	595	175	.294	14	88
SS	Ron Hansen	153	530	135	.255	22	86
LF	Gene Woodling	140	535	123	.283	11	62
CF	Jackie Brandt	145	511	130	.254	15	65
RF	Al Pilarcik	104	194	48	.247	4	17

==== Other batters ====
Note: G = Games played; AB = At bats; H = Hits; Avg. = Batting average; HR = Home runs; RBI = Runs batted in

Player	G	AB	H	Avg.	HR	RBI
Gene Stephens	84	193	46	.238	5	11
Walt Dropo	79	179	48	.268	4	21
Jim Busby	79	159	41	.258	0	12
Clint Courtney	83	154	35	.227	1	12
Dave Nicholson	54	113	21	.186	5	11
Willie Tasby	39	85	18	.212	0	3
Bob Boyd	71	82	26	.317	0	9
Albie Pearson	48	82	20	.244	1	6
Billy Klaus	46	43	9	.209	1	6
Dave Philley	14	34	9	.265	1	5
Joe Ginsberg	14	30	8	.267	0	6
John Powers	10	18	2	.111	0	0
Valmy Thomas	8	16	1	.063	0	0
Ray Barker	5	6	0	.000	0	0
Bobby Thomson	3	6	0	.000	0	0
Jerry Adair	3	5	1	.200	1	1
Gene Green	1	4	1	.250	0	0
Del Rice	1	1	0	.000	0	0
Barry Shetrone	1	0	0	----	0	0

=== Pitching ===
==== Starting pitchers ====
Note: G = Games pitched; IP = Innings pitched; W = Wins; L = Losses; ERA = Earned run average; SO = Strikeouts

Player	G	IP	W	L	ERA	SO
Chuck Estrada	36	208.2	18	11	3.58	144
Milt Pappas	30	205.2	15	11	3.37	126
Steve Barber	36	181.2	10	7	3.22	112
Hal Brown	30	159.0	12	5	3.06	66

==== Other pitchers ====
Note: G = Games pitched; IP = Innings pitched; W = Wins; L = Losses; ERA = Earned run average; SO = Strikeouts

Player	G	IP	W	L	ERA	SO
Jack Fisher	40	197.2	12	11	3.41	99
Hoyt Wilhelm	41	147.0	11	8	3.31	107
Jerry Walker	29	118.0	3	4	3.74	48
Arnie Portocarrero	13	40.2	3	2	4.43	15

==== Relief pitchers ====
Note: G = Games pitched; W = Wins; L = Losses; SV = Saves; ERA = Earned run average; SO = Strikeouts

Player	G	W	L	SV	ERA	SO
Gordon Jones	29	1	1	2	4.42	30
Billy Hoeft	19	2	1	0	4.34	14
Wes Stock	17	2	2	2	2.88	23
Rip Coleman	5	0	2	0	11.25	0
John Anderson	4	0	0	0	13.50	1
Bob Mabe	2	0	0	0	27.00	0

== Awards and honors ==
- Paul Richards, Associated Press AL Manager of the Year

== Farm system ==
Level	Team	League	Manager
AAA	Miami Marlins	International League	Al Vincent
AAA	Vancouver Mounties	Pacific Coast League	George Staller
B	Tri-City Braves	Northwest League	Whitey McDowell
B	Fox Cities Foxes	Illinois–Indiana–Iowa League	Earl Weaver
C	Stockton Ports	California League	Billy DeMars
C	Aberdeen Pheasants	Northern League	Lou Fitzgerald
D	Bluefield Orioles	Appalachian League	Barney Lutz
D	Leesburg Orioles	Florida State League	Bob Hooper

LEAGUE CHAMPIONS: Fox Cities
