= Billy Jurges =

American baseball player and manager (1908–1997)

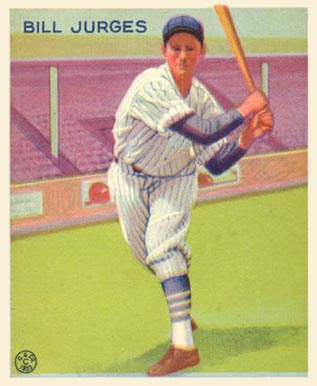
- Jurges with the Chicago Cubs in 1932
- Shortstop / Manager
- Born: May 9, 1908; Bronx, New York, U.S.
- Died: March 3, 1997 (aged 88); Clearwater, Florida, U.S.
- Batted: Right Threw: Right

MLB debut
- May 4, 1931, for the Chicago Cubs

Last MLB appearance
- September 9, 1947, for the Chicago Cubs

MLB statistics
- Batting average: .258
- Home runs: 43
- Runs batted in: 656
- Managerial record: 59–63
- Winning %: .484
- Stats at Baseball Reference

Teams
- As player: Chicago Cubs (1931–1938); New York Giants (1939–1945); Chicago Cubs (1946–1947); As manager: Boston Red Sox (1959–1960)

Career highlights and awards
- 3× All-Star (1937, 1939, 1940)

William Frederick Jurges (May 9, 1908 – March 3, 1997) was an American shortstop, third baseman, manager, coach and scout in Major League Baseball. He was born in the Bronx, New York. During the 1930s, he was central to three (1932, 1935 and 1938) National League champion Chicago Cubs teams. In July 1932, Jurges recovered from gunshot wounds—suffered when a distraught former girlfriend tried to kill him—to help lead the Cubs to the pennant.

== Career as a player ==
A right-handed batter and thrower who stood 5 feet 11 inches (1.80 m) tall and weighed 175 pounds (79 kg), Jurges batted .258 in 1,816 games over 17 seasons. He collected 1,613 hits, with 245 doubles, 55 triples and 43 home runs.

Although he was a light hitter, Jurges was known as a top-flight fielder as a shortstop. Baseball Reference credits him with leading in the National League in such defensive categories as Defensive Wins Above Replacement and Range Factor. He led NL shortstops in fielding percentage four times and in double plays once.

During his first eight seasons (1931–1938) in Chicago, he anchored an infield of Stan Hack (third base), Billy Herman (second base), and Charlie Grimm or Phil Cavarretta (first base). He then played seven more seasons (1939–1945) with the New York Giants, missing over 90 games in 1940 after he was hit in the head by a pitched ball. However, he recovered to play regularly for the Giants from 1941 to 1943. He then returned to the Cubs as a player-coach in 1946–47. For a while, during the off-seasons in the 1930s, Jurges stayed in shape by working out at the Waple Studio of Physical Culture in Alexandria, Virginia.

== Shooting ==
On July 6, 1932, Violet Valli, a showgirl with whom Jurges was romantically linked, tried to kill Jurges at the Hotel Carlos in Chicago, where each lived. Jurges had previously tried to end their relationship. Valli (born Violet Popovics) also left a suicide note in which she blamed the Cubs outfielder Kiki Cuyler for convincing Jurges to break up with her. Although initial reports stated that Jurges was shot while trying to wrestle the gun from Valli, later reports, based on Valli's suicide note, stated that she was trying to kill Jurges as well as commit suicide.

A week after the shooting, charges were dismissed against Valli when Jurges appeared in court and announced that he would not testify and wished to drop the charges. Valli was later involved in a lawsuit when she sued a real estate developer who was blackmailing her by threatening to release letters in which Valli threatened Jurges.

The future Chicago baseball club owner Bill Veeck was working for the Cubs at the time, and later wrote in his memoir The Hustler's Handbook (Ch. 6) that the intended victim was actually a married player of whom Valli had been the mistress. By Veeck's account, that player was relaxing in Jurges's room when confronted by Valli, and Jurges, trying to defuse the situation, was shot and then, being single, covered for the other player by indicating that he himself had jilted the showgirl.

The shooting of Jurges—and the later shooting of the professional ballplayer Eddie Waitkus at a Chicago hotel in 1949—may, either or both, have inspired the author Bernard Malamud in creating the title character, Roy Hobbs, of his novel The Natural (1952), later adapted into a Hollywood film starring Robert Redford and Glenn Close.

== Career as coach, manager and scout ==
Jurges was a full-time coach for the Cubs in 1948 under manager Grimm. Then, after leaving the Cubs, Jurges managed briefly in the farm systems of the Cleveland Indians and Milwaukee Braves, before returning to the coaching ranks with the original Washington Senators franchise in 1956. On July 3, 1959, still a Washington coach, he was named the surprise manager of the Boston Red Sox, who had fired Pinky Higgins. Jurges' appointment was hurriedly announced by Boston general manager Bucky Harris without consulting owner Tom Yawkey.

Managing from the third-base coach's box, Jurges was able to rally Boston in 1959: the Bosox won 44 of 80 games under him, improving from eighth to fifth place, and finally broke the color line with the promotion of Pumpsie Green from the minor leagues.

But the Red Sox, facing the end of Ted Williams' great career in 1960, were a team in disarray. Composed of aging veterans and mostly unpromising youngsters—and stunned by the sudden retirement, in his prime, of right fielder and 1958 Most Valuable Player Jackie Jensen—the 1960 Red Sox fell into the American League basement after losing 27 of their first 42 games. Jurges, an intense competitor, suffered in an alien organization composed largely of cronies of owner Yawkey. The Red Sox front office was about to undergo a massive shakeup, with Harris, Jurges' patron, on his way out the door. On June 8, Jurges left the team, citing illness. (Some Boston baseball writers believed that he suffered from nervous exhaustion.) He was fired two days later, and, after bench coach Del Baker handled the team for five days, Higgins returned to the manager's post he had lost 11 months before.

Jurges never managed again in baseball (his final record was 59 wins, 63 losses — .484) but he scouted for six teams before his final retirement: the Baltimore Orioles, New York Mets, Houston Colt .45s/Astros, the expansion Washington Senators and its successor, the Texas Rangers, the Seattle Mariners and the Cubs. He died at age 88 in Clearwater, Florida.

=== Managerial record ===
Team	Year	Regular season					Postseason			
Team	Year	Games	Won	Lost	Win %	Finish	Won	Lost	Win %	Result
BOS	1959	80	44	36	.550	5th in AL	–	–	–	–
BOS	1960	42	15	27	.357	fired	–	–	–	–
Total		122	59	63	.484		0	0	–	
