= 1960 Detroit Tigers season =

Major League Baseball season

1960 Detroit Tigers
- League: American League
- Ballpark: Briggs Stadium
- City: Detroit
- Record: 71–83 (.461)
- League place: 6th
- Owners: Fred Knorr, John Fetzer
- General managers: Bill DeWitt
- Managers: Jimmy Dykes, Billy Hitchcock, Joe Gordon
- Television: WJBK
- Radio: WKMH; WWJ; WJR (George Kell, Ernie Harwell)

The 1960 Detroit Tigers season was a season in American baseball. It involved the Tigers' sixth-place finish in the American League with a 71–83 record, 26 games behind the AL Champion New York Yankees.

== Offseason ==
- October 26, 1959: Gus Zernial was released by the Tigers.
- November 30, 1959: Steve Bilko was drafted by the Tigers from the Los Angeles Dodgers in the 1959 Rule 5 draft.
- December 5, 1959: Ted Lepcio, Ken Walters, and Alex Cosmidis (minors) were traded by the Tigers to the Philadelphia Phillies for Chico Fernández and Ray Semproch.
- The team changed the home jersey from featuring an Olde English 'D' to displaying "Tigers" in script; the Olde English 'D' returned in 1961.

== Regular season ==
=== Season standings ===
American League
Team	W	L	Pct.	GB	Home	Road
New York Yankees	97	57	.630	—	55‍–‍22	42‍–‍35
Baltimore Orioles	89	65	.578	8	44‍–‍33	45‍–‍32
Chicago White Sox	87	67	.565	10	51‍–‍26	36‍–‍41
Cleveland Indians	76	78	.494	21	39‍–‍38	37‍–‍40
Washington Senators	73	81	.474	24	32‍–‍45	41‍–‍36
Detroit Tigers	71	83	.461	26	40‍–‍37	31‍–‍46
Boston Red Sox	65	89	.422	32	36‍–‍41	29‍–‍48
Kansas City Athletics	58	96	.377	39	34‍–‍43	24‍–‍53

=== Record vs. opponents ===
1960 American League record Sources:
Team	BAL	BOS	CWS	CLE	DET	KCA	NYY	WSH
Baltimore	—	16–6	13–9	14–8	13–9	13–9	9–13	11–11
Boston	6–16	—	5–17	9–13	14–8	13–9	7–15	11–11
Chicago	9–13	17–5	—	11–11	11–11	15–7	10–12	14–8
Cleveland	8–14	13–9	11–11	—	7–15	15–7	6–16	16–6
Detroit	9–13	8–14	11–11	15–7	—	10–12	8–14	10–12
Kansas City	9–13	9–13	7–15	7–15	12–10	—	7–15–1	7–15
New York	13–9	15–7	12–10	16–6	14–8	15–7–1	—	12–10
Washington	11–11	11–11	8–14	6–16	12–10	15–7	10–12	—

=== Notable transactions ===
- April 12, 1960: The Tigers acquired first baseman Norm Cash from the Cleveland Indians for utility infielder Steve Demeter; Cash played in 2,018 games and slugged 373 homers for Detroit (1960–74); Demeter played in four games and was hitless in five at-bats for the Indians before disappearing into the minor leagues.
- April 17, 1960: Reigning American League batting average champion Harvey Kuenn (.353 in 1959) was traded by the Tigers to the Indians, even-up, for reigning AL home run champ Rocky Colavito (42 homers in 1959, tied with Harmon Killebrew).
- June 15, 1960: Ray Semproch and cash were traded by the Tigers to the Los Angeles Dodgers for Clem Labine.
- July 26, 1960: Harry Chiti was purchased by the Tigers from the Kansas City Athletics.
- August 3, 1960: In the only manager-for-manager trade in Major League history, the Tigers swapped Jimmy Dykes to the Indians for Joe Gordon; coaches Luke Appling and Jo-Jo White also traded teams.

=== Roster ===
1960 Detroit Tigers
Roster
Pitchers: 37 Hank Aguirre; 32 Bob Bruce; 14 Jim Bunning; 19 Pete Burnside; 18 Bill Fischer; 21 Paul Foytack; 23 Clem Labine; 17 Frank Lary; 18 Tom Morgan; 15 Don Mossi; 16 Phil Regan; 16 Ray Semproch; 30 Dave Sisler; 31 George Spencer	Catchers: 11 Lou Berberet; 27 Harry Chiti; 10 Hank Foiles; 10 Red Wilson; Infielders: 29 Steve Bilko; 2 Frank Bolling; 8 Rocky Bridges; 25 Norm Cash; 9 Chico Fernández; 5 Dick Gernert; 5 Gail Harris; 3 Dick McAuliffe; 8 Coot Veal; 22 Ozzie Virgil; 22 Casey Wise; 1 Eddie Yost	Outfielders: 36 Sandy Amorós; 24 Neil Chrisley; 7 Rocky Colavito; 3 Johnny Groth; 6 Al Kaline; 4 Charlie Maxwell; Other batters: 23 Em Lindbeck	Manager: 28 Jimmy Dykes; 28 Joe Gordon; 34 Billy Hitchcock; Coaches: 31 Luke Appling; 33 Tom Ferrick; 34 Billy Hitchcock; 40 Jo-Jo White

== Player stats ==
=== Batting ===
==== Starters by position ====
Note: Pos = Position; G = Games played; AB = At bats; H = Hits; Avg. = Batting average; HR = Home runs; RBI = Runs batted in

Pos	Player	G	AB	H	Avg.	HR	RBI
C	Lou Berberet	85	232	45	.194	5	23
1B	Norm Cash	121	353	101	.286	18	63
2B	Frank Bolling	139	536	136	.254	9	59
3B	Eddie Yost	143	497	129	.260	14	47
SS	Chico Fernández	133	435	105	.241	4	35
LF	Charlie Maxwell	134	482	114	.237	24	81
CF	Al Kaline	147	551	153	.278	15	68
RF	Rocky Colavito	145	555	138	.249	35	87

==== Other batters ====
Note: G = Games played; AB = At bats; H = Hits; Avg. = Batting average; HR = Home runs; RBI = Runs batted in

Player	G	AB	H	Avg.	HR	RBI
Steve Bilko	78	222	46	.207	9	25
Neil Chrisley	96	220	56	.255	5	24
Red Wilson	45	134	29	.216	1	14
Ozzie Virgil Sr.	62	132	30	.227	3	13
Harry Chiti	37	104	17	.163	2	5
Casey Wise	30	68	10	.147	2	5
Sandy Amorós	65	67	10	.149	1	7
Coot Veal	27	64	19	.297	0	8
Hank Foiles	26	56	14	.250	0	3
Dick Gernert	21	50	15	.300	1	5
Dick McAuliffe	8	27	7	.259	0	1
Johnny Groth	25	19	7	.368	0	2
Gail Harris	8	5	0	.000	0	0
Rocky Bridges	10	5	1	.200	0	0
Em Lindbeck	2	1	0	.000	0	0

=== Pitching ===
==== Starting pitchers ====
Note: G = Games pitched; IP = Innings pitched; W = Wins; L = Losses; ERA = Earned run average; SO = Strikeouts

Player	G	IP	W	L	ERA	SO
Frank Lary	38	274.1	15	15	3.81	149
Jim Bunning	36	252.0	11	14	2.79	201
Don Mossi	23	158.1	9	8	3.47	69

==== Other pitchers ====
Note: G = Games pitched; IP = Innings pitched; W = Wins; L = Losses; ERA = Earned run average; SO = Strikeouts

Player	G	IP	W	L	ERA	SO
Bob Bruce	34	130.0	4	7	3.74	76
Pete Burnside	31	113.2	7	7	4.28	71
Paul Foytack	28	96.2	2	11	6.14	38
Phil Regan	17	68.0	0	4	4.50	38
Bill Fischer	20	55.0	5	3	3.44	24

==== Relief pitchers ====
Note: G = Games pitched; W = Wins; L = Losses; SV = Saves; ERA = Earned run average; SO = Strikeouts

Player	G	W	L	SV	ERA	SO
Hank Aguirre	37	5	3	10	2.85	80
Dave Sisler	41	7	5	5	2.48	47
Tom Morgan	22	3	2	1	4.66	12
Ray Semproch	17	3	0	0	4.00	9
Clem Labine	14	0	3	2	5.12	6
George Spencer	5	0	1	0	3.52	4

== Farm system ==
Level	Team	League	Manager
AAA	Denver Bears	American Association	Charlie Metro
AA	Birmingham Barons	Southern Association	Skeeter Newsome
AA	Victoria Rosebuds	Texas League	Johnny Pesky
A	Knoxville Smokies	Sally League	Frank Skaff
B	Durham Bulls	Carolina League	Stubby Overmire
C	Duluth–Superior Dukes	Northern League	Frank Carswell
D	Montgomery Rebels	Alabama–Florida League	Al Lakeman
D	Decatur Commodores	Midwest League	Al Federoff
