= Nelson Chittum =

American baseball player (1933–2024)

- Pitcher
- Born: March 25, 1933; Harrisonburg, Virginia, U.S.
- Died: July 15, 2024 (aged 91); Lexington, Kentucky, U.S.
- Batted: Right Threw: Right

MLB debut
- August 17, 1958, for the St. Louis Cardinals

Last MLB appearance
- May 4, 1960, for the Boston Red Sox

MLB statistics
- Win–loss record: 3–1
- Earned run average: 3.84
- Strikeouts: 30
- Stats at Baseball Reference

Teams
- St. Louis Cardinals (1958); Boston Red Sox (1959–1960)

Nelson Boyd Chittum (March 25, 1933 – July 15, 2024) was an American Major League Baseball pitcher for the St. Louis Cardinals and Boston Red Sox. A right-hander, he stood 6 feet 1 inch (1.85 m) tall and weighed 180 pounds (82 kg).

== Career ==
Chittum attended Elizabethtown College, signed as an amateur free agent with the Cardinals in 1956, and won 23 games in his maiden season in professional baseball in the Class C California League. He made his major league debut with the team on August 1, 1958, versus the Los Angeles Dodgers, pitching three innings and surrendering eight hits. Traded to the Red Sox the following season, he posted an 11–5 won-lost record in the Triple-A American Association before his recall to Boston. In 21 games played as a relief pitcher, he won all three of his decisions and posted a sparkling 1.19 earned run average in 30 1/3 innings pitched. However, in May 1960, the Red Sox traded him to the Dodgers for veteran outfielder Rip Repulski, and Chittum returned to the Triple-A level for the remainder of his career.

After winning 106 minor league games, Chittum retired after the 1964 season.

== Death ==
Chittum died in Lexington, Kentucky, on July 15, 2024, at the age of 91.
