= 1960 New York Yankees season =

Season for the Major League Baseball team the New York Yankees

1960 New York Yankees
- American League champions
- League: American League
- Ballpark: Yankee Stadium
- City: Bronx, New York
- Record: 97–57 (.630)
- League place: 1st
- Owners: Dan Topping and Del Webb
- General managers: George Weiss
- Managers: Casey Stengel
- Television: WPIX (Mel Allen, Red Barber, Phil Rizzuto)
- Radio: WMGM (Mel Allen, Red Barber, Phil Rizzuto)

The 1960 New York Yankees season was the 58th season for the team. The team finished with a record of 97–57, winning its 25th pennant, finishing 8 games ahead of the Baltimore Orioles. New York was managed by Casey Stengel. The Yankees played their home games at Yankee Stadium. In the World Series, they were defeated by the Pittsburgh Pirates in seven games.

== Offseason ==
- December 11, 1959: Don Larsen, Hank Bauer, Norm Siebern, and Marv Throneberry were traded by the Yankees to the Kansas City Athletics for Roger Maris, Joe DeMaestri and Kent Hadley.
- Prior to 1960 season: Jesse Gonder was acquired by the Yankees from the Cincinnati Reds.

== Regular season ==
Elston Howard took over as the Yankees' everyday catcher, while Yogi Berra split time between the outfield and serving as Howard's backup.

=== Season standings ===
American League
Team	W	L	Pct.	GB	Home	Road
New York Yankees	97	57	.630	—	55‍–‍22	42‍–‍35
Baltimore Orioles	89	65	.578	8	44‍–‍33	45‍–‍32
Chicago White Sox	87	67	.565	10	51‍–‍26	36‍–‍41
Cleveland Indians	76	78	.494	21	39‍–‍38	37‍–‍40
Washington Senators	73	81	.474	24	32‍–‍45	41‍–‍36
Detroit Tigers	71	83	.461	26	40‍–‍37	31‍–‍46
Boston Red Sox	65	89	.422	32	36‍–‍41	29‍–‍48
Kansas City Athletics	58	96	.377	39	34‍–‍43	24‍–‍53

=== Record vs. opponents ===
1960 American League record Sources:
Team	BAL	BOS	CWS	CLE	DET	KCA	NYY	WSH
Baltimore	—	16–6	13–9	14–8	13–9	13–9	9–13	11–11
Boston	6–16	—	5–17	9–13	14–8	13–9	7–15	11–11
Chicago	9–13	17–5	—	11–11	11–11	15–7	10–12	14–8
Cleveland	8–14	13–9	11–11	—	7–15	15–7	6–16	16–6
Detroit	9–13	8–14	11–11	15–7	—	10–12	8–14	10–12
Kansas City	9–13	9–13	7–15	7–15	12–10	—	7–15–1	7–15
New York	13–9	15–7	12–10	16–6	14–8	15–7–1	—	12–10
Washington	11–11	11–11	8–14	6–16	12–10	15–7	10–12	—

=== Notable transactions ===
- May 19, 1960: Andy Carey was traded by the Yankees to the Kansas City Athletics for Bob Cerv.

=== Roster ===
1960 New York Yankees
Roster
Pitchers: 47 Luis Arroyo; 39 Jim Coates; 28 Art Ditmar; 26 Ryne Duren; 16 Whitey Ford; 40 John Gabler; 18 Eli Grba; 53 Johnny James; 18 Fred Kipp; 24 Duke Maas; 30 Bobby Shantz; 46 Bill Short; 22 Bill Stafford; 29 Hal Stowe; 23 Ralph Terry; 19 Bob Turley	Catchers: 8 Yogi Berra; 38 Johnny Blanchard; 27 Jesse Gonder; 32 Elston Howard; 47 Billy Shantz; Infielders: 34 Clete Boyer; 6 Andy Carey; 20 Joe DeMaestri; 25 Kent Hadley; 6 Deron Johnson; 10 Tony Kubek; 25 Dale Long; 12 Gil McDougald; 1 Bobby Richardson; 14 Bill Skowron	Outfielders: 17 Bob Cerv; 44 Ken Hunt; 11 Héctor López; 7 Mickey Mantle; 9 Roger Maris; 15 Jim Pisoni; 17 Elmer Valo	Manager: 37 Casey Stengel; Coaches: 2 Frankie Crosetti; 33 Bill Dickey; 44 Jim Hegan; 35 Ralph Houk; 36 Eddie Lopat

== Player stats ==
=== Batting ===
= Indicates team leader

= Indicates league leader

==== Starters by position ====
Note: Pos = Position; G = Games played; AB = At bats; H = Hits; R = Runs; Avg. = Batting average; HR = Home runs; RBI = Runs batted in

Pos	Player	G	AB	R	H	Avg.	HR	RBI
C	Elston Howard	107	323	29	79	.245	6	39
1B	Bill Skowron	146	538	63	166	.309	26	91
2B	Bobby Richardson	150	460	45	116	.252	1	26
3B	Clete Boyer	124	393	54	95	.242	14	46
SS	Tony Kubek	147	568	77	155	.273	14	62
LF	Héctor López	131	408	66	116	.284	9	42
CF	Mickey Mantle	153	527	119	145	.275	40	94
RF	Roger Maris	136	499	98	141	.283	39	112

==== Other batters ====
Note: G = Games played; AB = At bats; H = Hits; Avg. = Batting average; HR = Home runs; RBI = Runs batted in

Player	G	AB	H	Avg.	HR	RBI
Yogi Berra	120	359	99	.276	15	62
Gil McDougald	119	337	87	.258	8	34
Bob Cerv	87	216	54	.250	8	28
Johnny Blanchard	53	99	24	.242	4	14
Kent Hadley	55	64	13	.203	4	11
Dale Long	26	41	15	.366	3	10
Joe DeMaestri	49	35	8	.229	0	2
Ken Hunt	25	22	6	.273	0	1
Jim Pisoni	20	9	1	.111	0	1
Jesse Gonder	7	7	2	.286	1	3
Elmer Valo	8	5	0	.000	0	0
Deron Johnson	6	4	2	.500	0	0
Andy Carey	4	3	1	.333	0	1
Billy Shantz	1	0	0	----	0	0

=== Pitching ===
==== Starting pitchers ====
Note: G = Games pitched; IP = Innings pitched; W = Wins; L = Losses; ERA = Earned run average; SO = Strikeouts

Player	G	IP	W	L	ERA	SO
Art Ditmar	34	200.0	15	9	3.06	65
Whitey Ford	33	192.2	12	9	3.08	85
Bob Turley	34	173.1	9	3	3.27	87
Jim Coates	35	149.1	13	3	4.28	73
Bill Short	10	47.0	3	5	4.79	14

==== Other pitchers ====
Note: G = Games pitched; IP = Innings pitched; W = Wins; L = Losses; ERA = Earned run average; SO = Strikeouts

Player	G	IP	W	L	ERA	SO
Ralph Terry	35	166.2	10	8	3.40	92
Eli Grba	24	80.2	6	4	3.68	32
Bill Stafford	11	60.0	3	1	2.25	36
John Gabler	21	52.0	3	3	4.15	19

==== Relief pitchers ====
Note: G = Games pitched; W = Wins; L = Losses; SV = Saves; ERA = Earned run average; SO = Strikeouts

Player	G	W	L	SV	ERA	SO
Bobby Shantz	42	5	4	11	2.79	54
Ryne Duren	42	3	4	9	4.96	67
Duke Maas	35	5	1	4	4.09	28
Luis Arroyo	29	5	1	7	2.88	29
Johnny James	28	5	1	2	4.36	29
Fred Kipp	4	0	1	0	6.23	2

== 1960 World Series ==
NL Pittsburgh Pirates (4) vs. AL New York Yankees (3)

Game	Score	Date	Location	Attendance
1	Yankees – 4, Pirates – 6	October 5	Forbes Field	36,676
2	Yankees – 16, Pirates – 3	October 6	Forbes Field	37,308
3	Pirates – 0, Yankees – 10	October 8	Yankee Stadium	70,001
4	Pirates – 3, Yankees – 2	October 9	Yankee Stadium	67,812
5	Pirates – 5, Yankees – 2	October 10	Yankee Stadium	62,753
6	Yankees – 12, Pirates – 0	October 12	Forbes Field	38,580
7	Yankees – 9, Pirates – 10	October 13	Forbes Field	36,683

== Awards and honors ==
- Roger Maris, American League MVP
- Bobby Richardson, World Series MVP

== Farm system ==
Level	Team	League	Manager
AAA	Richmond Virginians	International League	Steve Souchock
AA	Amarillo Gold Sox	Texas League	Jim Gleeson
A	Binghamton Triplets	Eastern League	Dee Phillips
B	Greensboro Yankees	Carolina League	Hal Charnofsky
C	Modesto Reds	California League	Tom Hamilton
C	Fargo-Moorhead Twins	Northern League	John Fitzpatrick
D	St. Petersburg Saints	Florida State League	Stan Charnofsky and Randy Gumpert
D	Auburn Yankees	New York–Penn League	Bob Bauer

LEAGUE CHAMPIONS: Greensboro
