= Dick Brown (baseball) =

American baseball player (1935–1970)

- 1963 Topps Dick Brown baseball card
- Catcher
- Born: January 17, 1935; Shinnston, West Virginia, U.S.
- Died: April 17, 1970 (aged 35); Baltimore, Maryland, U.S.
- Batted: Right Threw: Right

MLB debut
- June 20, 1957, for the Cleveland Indians

Last MLB appearance
- October 3, 1965, for the Baltimore Orioles

MLB statistics
- Batting average: .244
- Home runs: 62
- Runs batted in: 223
- Stats at Baseball Reference

Teams
- Cleveland Indians (1957–1959); Chicago White Sox (1960); Detroit Tigers (1961–1962); Baltimore Orioles (1963–1965)

Richard Ernest Brown (January 17, 1935 – April 17, 1970) was an American professional baseball catcher who played in Major League Baseball (MLB) for the Cleveland Indians, Chicago White Sox, Detroit Tigers and Baltimore Orioles. The native of Shinnston, West Virginia, attended Florida State University. He threw and batted right-handed and was listed as 6 feet 2 inches (1.88 m) tall and 176 pounds (80 kg). His brother Larry Brown had a 12-year MLB career (1963–74) as an infielder with four American League teams.

Originally signed by the Indians in 1953, Dick Brown made his big league debut on June 20, 1957, against the Boston Red Sox at the age of 22. After three seasons with the Indians, he was traded to the Chicago White Sox on December 6, 1959, along with Don Ferrarese, Minnie Miñoso and Jake Striker for Norm Cash, Bubba Phillips and Johnny Romano.

Brown caught for six pitchers who would eventually be inducted into the Baseball Hall of Fame. He played in 636 games over nine seasons, hitting .244 with 62 home runs and 223 runs batted in. His best two seasons were the two he spent with Detroit: he hit 16 home runs in 1961 and 12 home runs in 1962. He had a career .989 fielding percentage. Career highlights include back-to-back-to-back home runs he hit with Norm Cash and Steve Boros on May 23, 1961. He hit a grand slam less than one month earlier on April 29.

He played his final game on October 3, 1965. He had been expected to continue as the Orioles' starting catcher entering the 1966 season, but the discovery of a brain tumor early in spring training necessitated surgery to remove it on March 7. Additional surgery 11 1/2 weeks later revealed another brain tumor, an inoperable one that effectively ended Brown's playing career and cost him his life. He served as a scout for the Orioles until his death at age 35 in Baltimore in 1970.
