= Jake Jacobs =

American baseball player (1937-2010)

- Outfielder
- Born: June 9, 1937; Youngstown, Ohio, U.S.
- Died: July 26, 2010 (aged 73); Palmetto, Florida, U.S.
- Batted: Right Threw: Right

MLB debut
- September 13, 1960, for the Washington Senators

Last MLB appearance
- September 28, 1961, for the Minnesota Twins

MLB statistics
- Batting average: .200
- At bats: 10
- Hits: 2
- Stats at Baseball Reference

Teams
- Washington Senators/Minnesota Twins (1960–61)

Lamar Gary "Jake" Jacobs (June 9, 1937 – July 26, 2010) was an American professional baseball outfielder. He played parts of two seasons in Major League Baseball, 1960 and 1961, Washington Senators and Minnesota Twins. Listed at 6 ft 0 in (1.83 m), 175 lb (79 kg), he batted and threw right-handed.

== Life ==
A native of Youngstown, Ohio, Jacobs attended Boardman High School and graduated from Ohio University. He was signed as a bonus baby non-drafted free agent by the Washington Senators in 1959, being immediately allocated to Class-D Sanford Greyhounds. In his professional debut, Jacobs led his team with a .313 batting average and a 448 slugging percentage, gaining a promotion to the Class-A Charlotte Hornets the next year.

Jacobs spent most of 1960 with Charlotte before joining the Senators in late September, appearing in two games as a pinch hitter and four as a pinch runner. He ascended to Triple-A in 1961, and split the season between the Syracuse Chiefs and Indianapolis Indians before returning to the majors in September for four games with the Minnesota Twins (the Senators had moved to Minneapolis-St. Paul, Minnesota during the offseason). He played two more years in the minors, for the Vancouver Mounties in 1962 and Charlotte again in 1963.

In his brief majors career, Jacobs was a .200 hitter (2-for-10) and scored two runs in 10 games. In five minor league seasons, he posted a .277 average in 545 games.

Jacobs died in Palmetto, Florida where he lived, at the age of 73 from dementia.
