= Don Ferrarese =

American baseball player (1929–2024)

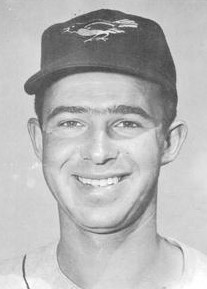
- Ferrarese in 1957
- Pitcher
- Born: June 19, 1929; Oakland, California, U.S.
- Died: November 4, 2024 (aged 95); Durango, Colorado, U.S.
- Batted: Right Threw: Left

MLB debut
- April 11, 1955, for the Baltimore Orioles

Last MLB appearance
- September 22, 1962, for the St. Louis Cardinals

MLB statistics
- Win–loss record: 19–36
- Earned run average: 4.00
- Strikeouts: 350
- Stats at Baseball Reference

Teams
- Baltimore Orioles (1955–1957); Cleveland Indians (1958–1959); Chicago White Sox (1960); Philadelphia Phillies (1961–1962); St. Louis Cardinals (1962)

Donald Hugh Ferrarese (June 19, 1929 – November 4, 2024) was an American professional baseball pitcher, who played in Major League Baseball (MLB) for the Baltimore Orioles, Cleveland Indians, Chicago White Sox, Philadelphia Phillies and St. Louis Cardinals from 1955 to 1962. A left-handed thrower, he batted right-handed. Ferrarese was fairly small, standing at 5 ft 9 in (1.75 m), and weighing 170 pounds (77 kg), during his playing days. The native of Oakland graduated from Acalanes High School in Lafayette, California, and attended Saint Mary's College. His professional baseball career started in 1948 in the Phillies' organization at Class C Stockton of the California League. He was a member of his hometown Oakland Oaks of the top-level Pacific Coast League for all or parts of four seasons between 1949 and 1955, and won 18 games for them in 1954. Ferrarese also missed the 1951 and 1952 campaigns while performing Korean War military service. Ferrarese died in Durango, Colorado on November 4, 2024, at the age of 95.

== Major League Baseball career ==
Ferrarese was used both as a starter and reliever, throughout most of his MLB career. He began his career, as a reliever, on April 11, 1955, at the age of 26; in the first big league season, Ferrarese posted a 3.00 earned run average (ERA) in 6 games (9 innings of work). In 1959 he went 5 and 3, with a 3.20 ERA, in 76 innings of work. Although Ferrarese walked 51 and struck out only 45, he still gave up only 58 hits, that season.

In 1962 while spending time with the Phillies and Cardinals, he posted a combined 3.27 ERA (2.70 as a Cardinal) in 63+ innings of work. Although Ferrarese went 1 and 5, his ERA was considerably lower than the league average (4.21). Ferrarese played his final big-league game on September 22, 1962. Overall, he was 19 and 36, with a 4.00 ERA, in just over 506 innings of work. Ferrarese struck out 350 and walked 295 batters.

Ferrarese's career batting average was .156 (20 for 128). The highlights of his hitting career came on May 26, 1959, and June 22, 1962, respectively. On May 26, 1959, Ferrarese collected three hits in three at-bats, all of them, doubles. He drove in two of the three runs the Indians scored, to help his team beat the White Sox, 3 to 0. The pitchers that Ferrarese faced in that game were Dick Donovan and Gerry Staley. On June 22, 1962, facing pitcher Jim Owens, Ferrarese hit a two-run home run, in the third inning. That was not enough though, as the Phillies — his former team — beat the Cardinals, 11 to 3. In Ferrarese‘s entire 1956 season, he collected one hit in 28 at-bats that year, for a .036 average. Ferrarese struck out in 20.3% of his at-bats. As a fielder, Ferrarese posted a .952 fielding percentage. Overall, his career statistics are most similar to those of Bryan Clark.

== Major transactions ==
Ferrarese was involved in multiple trades in his career, even after his big league career was over:

- December 6, 1954: Traded by the Chicago White Sox with Matt Batts, Don Johnson, and Fred Marsh to the Baltimore Orioles for Jim Brideweser, Bob Chakales, and Clint Courtney.
- April 1, 1958: Traded by the Baltimore Orioles with Larry Doby to the Cleveland Indians for Gene Woodling, Dick Williams, and Bud Daley.
- December 6, 1959: Traded by the Cleveland Indians with Dick Brown, Minnie Miñoso, and Jake Striker to the Chicago White Sox for Johnny Romano, Bubba Phillips, and Norm Cash.
- April 28, 1962: Traded by the Philadelphia Phillies to the St. Louis Cardinals for Bobby Locke and cash.
- February, 1963: Traded by the St. Louis Cardinals to the Houston Colt .45's for Bobby Tiefenauer.
