= Bubba Phillips =

American baseball player (1928–1993)

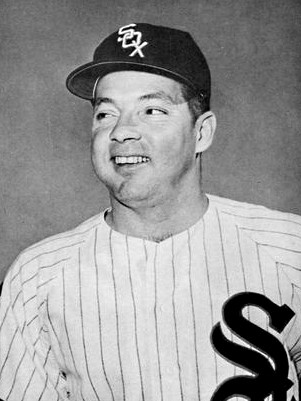
- Third baseman / Outfielder
- Born: February 24, 1928; West Point, Mississippi, U.S.
- Died: June 22, 1993 (aged 65); Hattiesburg, Mississippi, U.S.
- Batted: Right Threw: Right

MLB debut
- April 30, 1955, for the Detroit Tigers

Last MLB appearance
- September 6, 1964, for the Detroit Tigers

MLB statistics
- Batting average: .255
- Home runs: 62
- Runs batted in: 356
- Stats at Baseball Reference

Teams
- Detroit Tigers (1955); Chicago White Sox (1956–1959); Cleveland Indians (1960–1962); Detroit Tigers (1963–1964)

John Melvin "Bubba" Phillips (February 24, 1928 – June 22, 1993) was an American professional baseball (MLB) third baseman from Macon, Mississippi. He played for ten seasons in Major League Baseball (MLB) for the Detroit Tigers, Chicago White Sox, and Cleveland Indians, from 1955 through 1964. Phillips was inducted into the Mississippi Sports Hall of Fame in 1972.

== Early life, football and baseball ==
Phillips was born in West Point, Mississippi. He graduated from Macon High School where he was a football standout and softball player in 1946. He was awarded a football scholarship to the University of Southern Mississippi (then Mississippi Southern College) and was a multi-sport athlete. He excelled in baseball and football and began being watched by major league-scouts in 1946. He received "Little All-America" football honors as captain (running back) of the football team his senior year in 1950. While in college he chose a professional baseball career over a football career turning down the San Francisco 49ers of the All-America Football Conference for a contract with the Detroit Tigers organization in 1948.

== Minor league and military service ==
Phillips was signed and sent to the Stroudsburg Poconos (Stroudsburg, Pennsylvania) of the North Atlantic League where he hit .302 in 11 games played in 1948. In 1949, he moved up to Thomasville (Thomasville, Georgia) Tigers' farm club in the Class D Georgia-Florida league where he hit .329 in 138 games. For the Class A Flint Arrows in 1950 he hit .290. In 1951 Phillips hit .314 combined for Toledo and Williamsport. In 1952, he hit .291 with the Tigers' International League farm team at Buffalo, New York.

Phillipa was then drafted into military service for two years and spent 1953 and 1954 with the United States Army.

== Major League Baseball ==
=== Detroit Tigers (1955) ===
Phillips made his major league debut on April 12, 1955, with the Detroit Tigers at the age of 27 and wearing number 11. Though he spent most of the year as a bench player, in 184 at-bats he hit .234. He started in left field on Opening Day and went 0-for-3 against the Kansas City Athletics. He hit three home runs, had 23 RBIs, in 95 games played.

After the 1955 season, he was traded from the Tigers to the Chicago White Sox for Virgil Trucks.

=== Chicago White Sox (1956-1959) ===
In 1956, Phillips spent his first season on the White Sox team like Detroit, mostly a bench player. He was used sometimes as a pinch hitter, an outfield defensive replacement, and a one time as a third baseman. He hit .273 with 2 home runs, and 11 RBIs, in 67 games played.

In 1957, Phillips became the White Sox starting third baseman. He hit .270 with 7 home runs, and 42 RBIs, in 121 games. He took the starting job at 3rd base from Fred Hatfield who hit .202 that year.

In 1958, Phillips spent time almost evenly at third base and in the outfield, playing 10 more games at third base than in the outfield. He hit .273 with five home runs, and 30 RBIs, in 84 games. Unfortunately, on June 8, he broke his right foot for six weeks tripping over first base and was replaced by utility player, Billy Goodman. Phillips was a consistent hitter who did not walk much but did not strike out much either.

In 1959, Phillips reclaimed his starting job at third base from Goodman (74 games at third base) playing 100 games at third and 23 games in the outfield, helping the White Sox win the American League Pennant championship. Phillips hit .264 with 5 home runs, 40 RBIs, 27 doubles, and 27 walks, in 117 games. He also did well in the World Series against the Los Angeles Dodgers, hitting .300 in 10 at-bats. After the 1959 season, Phillips was traded to the Cleveland Indians with Norm Cash and Johnny Romano for Minnie Miñoso, Dick Brown, Don Ferrarese, and Jake Striker. The White Sox also acquired Gene Freese from the National League's (NL) Philadelphia Phillies for their third base position in exchange for outfielder Johnny Callison.

=== Cleveland Indians (1960-1962) ===
In 1960, Phillips batted only .207 with 4 home runs. He ended up having to relinquish time at third to Ken Aspromonte and other players.

In 1961, Phillips rebounded, finding a power stroke that led him to hit 18 home runs, including the only two grand slam's of his career. He finished the season hitting .264 with 72 RBIs. Manager Jimmy Dykes even tried for a time him as the Indians' cleanup hitter. He led the American League with 188 putouts as third baseman.

In 1962, Phillips was not as successful as he was 1961. He hit .258 with 10 home runs, and 54 RBIs. He was part of a rare back-to-back-to-back home run feat, in which he, Jerry Kindall, and Jim Mahoney all connected home runs in succession off pitcher Bill Stafford on June 17.

After the 1962 season, Phillips was traded to the Detroit Tigers for pitchers Ron Nischwitz and Gordon Seyfried. Cleveland was making room for rookie third baseman, Max Alvis.

=== Detroit Tigers (1963-1964) ===
In 1963, Phillips was the Tigers starting third baseman, he hit .246 with 5 home runs. He had a career high of 6 stolen bases and led the American League with 10 sacrifice flies.

In 1964, Phillips lost his starting job to a young Don Wert. Phillips hit .253 with 3 home runs and 6 RBIs. He finished his major league baseball career on September 18 as a pinch-runner in the ninth inning in a game against the Indians.

=== Summary ===
Phillips had a .255 lifetime batting average with 62 home runs and 356 RBIs. He had a .964 fielding average. He walked 182 times and struck out only 314 times in 3,278 at-bats. He collected his final major league hit off Gerry Arrigo and his final home run off Dave Stenhouse. According to Baseball-Reference, the player he is most similar to statistically is Mike Shannon. He was teammates with Barry Latman for 6 seasons, longer than any other teammate. He mostly wore number #5 during his career, although during part of the 1960 season he wore #7, and during his final two years at Cleveland he wore #1.

== Post baseball ==
Phillips worked in real estate and was a tennis instructor at the University of Southern Mississippi and the city of Hattiesburg.

In 1972, he was inducted into the Mississippi Sports Hall of Fame.

In 1981, Phillips played "Coach Hardy" in the TV film, Don't Look Back: The Story of Leroy 'Satchel' Paige, which starred Louis Gossett Jr. as legendary pitcher Satchel Paige. The film is based on the 1993 book, Maybe I'll Pitch Forever. Paige appears briefly in the film as himself.

== Death ==
Phillips died from a heart attack at age 65 in Hattiesburg, Mississippi, and is buried at Cedarlawn Cemetery in Philadelphia, Mississippi.
