= Jake Striker =

American baseball player (1933–2013)

- Pitcher
- Born: October 23, 1933; New Washington, Ohio, U.S.
- Died: March 7, 2013 (aged 79); Dallas, Oregon, U.S.
- Batted: Left Threw: Left

MLB debut
- September 25, 1959, for the Cleveland Indians

Last MLB appearance
- April 24, 1960, for the Chicago White Sox

MLB statistics
- ERA: 3.48
- Record: 1-0
- Strikeouts: 6
- Stats at Baseball Reference

Teams
- Cleveland Indians (1959); Chicago White Sox (1960)

Wilbur Scott "Jake" Striker (October 23, 1933 – March 7, 2013) was an American left-handed pitcher in Major League Baseball who played in 1959 and 1960 with the Cleveland Indians and Chicago White Sox.

Originally signed by the Indians in 1952, the 6 ft 2 in (1.88 m), 200 lb (91 kg) Striker enjoyed a promising start to his career. In his MLB debut on September 25, 1959, against the Kansas City Athletics at the age of 25, Striker tossed 6 2/3 innings of solid baseball, allowing only two earned runs for a 2.70 earned run average and the win. He went 0 for 1 with a walk at the plate in what would be the only game in which he would appear in 1959.

The only player from Heidelberg College to reach the major leagues, Striker was traded on December 6, 1959 with Dick Brown, Don Ferrarese and Minnie Miñoso to the White Sox for Johnny Romano, Bubba Phillips and Norm Cash. He only appeared in two games with the White Sox, both relief appearances. In 3+ innings of work, he posted a 4.91 ERA, striking out one and walking one. His major league career ended on April 24, 1960. Overall, he went 1 and 0 with a 3.48 ERA in 3 games in his career. He walked five, struck out six and gave up one home run (to Casey Wise) in about 10 innings of work. Overall, he wore three uniform numbers in his short two-year career. He wore 23 with the Indians, and 20 and 31 with the White Sox.
