= 1960 Major League Baseball season =

1960 MLB season
- League: American League (AL); National League (NL)
- Sport: Baseball
- Duration: Regular season: April 18 – October 2, 1960 (AL); April 12 – October 2, 1960 (NL); World Series: October 5–13, 1960
- Games: 154
- Teams: 16 (8 per league)
- TV partner(s): NBC, CBS, ABC

Regular season
- Season MVP: AL: Roger Maris (NYY); NL: Dick Groat (PIT)
- AL champions: New York Yankees
- AL runners-up: Baltimore Orioles
- NL champions: Pittsburgh Pirates
- NL runners-up: Milwaukee Braves

World Series
- Champions: Pittsburgh Pirates
- Runners-up: New York Yankees
- World Series MVP: Bobby Richardson (NYY)

MLB seasons
- ← 1959 1961 →

Locations of teams for the 1955–1960 American League seasons
American League
Locations of teams for the 1960–1961 National League seasons
National League

The 1960 major league baseball season began on April 12, 1960. The regular season ended on October 2, with the Pittsburgh Pirates and New York Yankees as the regular season champions of the National League and American League, respectively. The postseason began with Game 1 of the 57th World Series on October 5 and ended with Game 7 on October 13. In the second iteration of this World Series matchup, the Pirates, led by second baseman Bill Mazeroski, defeated the Yankees, led by outfield sluggers Mickey Mantle and Roger Maris, four games to three, capturing their third championship in franchise history, since their previous in 1925. The series ended with Mazeroski hitting a walk-off home run in Game 7 and is among the most memorable in baseball history. Going into the season, the defending World Series champions were the Los Angeles Dodgers from the 1959 season.

For the second year, there were two separate All-Star Games played. The first, the 28th All-Star Game, was held on July 11 at Municipal Stadium in Kansas City, Missouri, home of the Kansas City Athletics. The National League won, 5–3. The second, the 29th All-Star Game, was held on July 13 at Yankee Stadium in New York, New York, home of the New York Yankees. The National League won, 6–0.

The American League's Washington Senators played their final season in Washington, D.C. before moving to the Minneapolis–Saint Paul metropolitan area as the Minnesota Twins for the 1961 season. Due to threats of the proposed Continental League, a third major league which would host teams in cities that did not play major-league teams (as well as a National League New York team), the 1960 season would prove to be the final season before the expansion-era; the following season would see the American League grow to 10 teams, ending the 16-team hegemony across the American and National Leagues that had existed for most of the 20th century to this point. Expansion would also see the end of the 154-game schedule in favor of a 162-game schedule.

Following the end of the previous season, the two leagues saw their first interleague trade on November 21, when the Chicago Cubs received 1B Dick Gernert from the Boston Red Sox, in exchange for RHP Dave Hillman and 1B Jim Marshall.

== Schedule ==
The 1960 schedule consisted of 154 games for all teams in the American League and National League, each of which had eight teams. Each team was scheduled to play 22 games against the other seven teams of their respective league. This continued the format put in place since the 1904 season (except for 1919) and was the last season to use the format by the American League due to the 1961 American League expansion, which saw an extension of the schedule to 162 games. The National League would use the 154-game format for one more season.

National League Opening Day took place on April 12, featuring all eight teams, while American League Opening Day took place on April 18, featuring the Boston Red Sox and Washington Senators. The final day of the regular season was on October 2, which saw all sixteen teams play, continuing the trend since the previous season. The World Series took place between October 5 and October 13.

== Rule change ==
The 1960 season saw the following rule change:

- While previously, drafted players to major-league or minor-league teams were based on a sliding scale ($15,000 (equivalent to $163,000 in 2025) in the majors to at most half the amount to as low as a fifth the amount in the minors), a $12,000 (equivalent to $131,000 in 2025) price tag was set at all levels of professional baseball.

== Teams ==
| League | Team | City | Ballpark | Capacity | Manager |
|---|---|---|---|---|---|
| American League | Baltimore Orioles | Baltimore, Maryland | Baltimore Memorial Stadium | 47,778 | Paul Richards |
| American League | Boston Red Sox | Boston, Massachusetts | Fenway Park | 33,368 | Billy Jurges |
| American League | Boston Red Sox | Boston, Massachusetts | Fenway Park | 33,368 | Del Baker |
| American League | Boston Red Sox | Boston, Massachusetts | Fenway Park | 33,368 | Pinky Higgins |
| American League | Chicago White Sox | Chicago, Illinois | Comiskey Park | 46,550 | Al López |
| American League | Cleveland Indians | Cleveland, Ohio | Cleveland Stadium | 73,811 | Joe Gordon |
| American League | Cleveland Indians | Cleveland, Ohio | Cleveland Stadium | 73,811 | Jo-Jo White |
| American League | Cleveland Indians | Cleveland, Ohio | Cleveland Stadium | 73,811 | Jimmy Dykes |
| American League | Detroit Tigers | Detroit, Michigan | Briggs Stadium | 58,000 | Jimmy Dykes |
| American League | Detroit Tigers | Detroit, Michigan | Briggs Stadium | 58,000 | Billy Hitchcock |
| American League | Detroit Tigers | Detroit, Michigan | Briggs Stadium | 58,000 | Joe Gordon |
| American League | Kansas City Athletics | Kansas City, Missouri | Municipal Stadium | 30,296 | Bob Elliott |
| American League | New York Yankees | New York, New York | Yankee Stadium | 67,205 | Casey Stengel |
| American League | Washington Senators | Washington, D.C. | Griffith Stadium | 28,669 | Cookie Lavagetto |
| National League | Chicago Cubs | Chicago, Illinois | Wrigley Field | 36,755 | Charlie Grimm |
| National League | Chicago Cubs | Chicago, Illinois | Wrigley Field | 36,755 | Lou Boudreau |
| National League | Cincinnati Reds | Cincinnati, Ohio | Crosley Field | 30,322 | Fred Hutchinson |
| National League | Los Angeles Dodgers | Los Angeles, California | Los Angeles Memorial Coliseum | 94,600 | Walter Alston |
| National League | Milwaukee Braves | Milwaukee, Wisconsin | Milwaukee County Stadium | 43,768 | Chuck Dressen |
| National League | Philadelphia Phillies | Philadelphia, Pennsylvania | Connie Mack Stadium | 33,359 | Eddie Sawyer |
| National League | Philadelphia Phillies | Philadelphia, Pennsylvania | Connie Mack Stadium | 33,359 | Andy Cohen |
| National League | Philadelphia Phillies | Philadelphia, Pennsylvania | Connie Mack Stadium | 33,359 | Gene Mauch |
| National League | Pittsburgh Pirates | Pittsburgh, Pennsylvania | Forbes Field | 35,500 | Danny Murtaugh |
| National League | San Francisco Giants | San Francisco, California | Candlestick Park | 43,765 | Bill Rigney |
| National League | San Francisco Giants | San Francisco, California | Candlestick Park | 43,765 | Tom Sheehan |
| National League | St. Louis Cardinals | St. Louis, Missouri | Busch Stadium | 30,500 | Solly Hemus |

== Standings ==
=== American League ===
American League
| Team | W | L | Pct. | GB | Home | Road |
|---|---|---|---|---|---|---|
| New York Yankees | 97 | 57 | .630 | — | 55‍–‍22 | 42‍–‍35 |
| Baltimore Orioles | 89 | 65 | .578 | 8 | 44‍–‍33 | 45‍–‍32 |
| Chicago White Sox | 87 | 67 | .565 | 10 | 51‍–‍26 | 36‍–‍41 |
| Cleveland Indians | 76 | 78 | .494 | 21 | 39‍–‍38 | 37‍–‍40 |
| Washington Senators | 73 | 81 | .474 | 24 | 32‍–‍45 | 41‍–‍36 |
| Detroit Tigers | 71 | 83 | .461 | 26 | 40‍–‍37 | 31‍–‍46 |
| Boston Red Sox | 65 | 89 | .422 | 32 | 36‍–‍41 | 29‍–‍48 |
| Kansas City Athletics | 58 | 96 | .377 | 39 | 34‍–‍43 | 24‍–‍53 |

=== National League ===
National League
| Team | W | L | Pct. | GB | Home | Road |
|---|---|---|---|---|---|---|
| Pittsburgh Pirates | 95 | 59 | .617 | — | 52‍–‍25 | 43‍–‍34 |
| Milwaukee Braves | 88 | 66 | .571 | 7 | 51‍–‍26 | 37‍–‍40 |
| St. Louis Cardinals | 86 | 68 | .558 | 9 | 51‍–‍26 | 35‍–‍42 |
| Los Angeles Dodgers | 82 | 72 | .532 | 13 | 42‍–‍35 | 40‍–‍37 |
| San Francisco Giants | 79 | 75 | .513 | 16 | 45‍–‍32 | 34‍–‍43 |
| Cincinnati Reds | 67 | 87 | .435 | 28 | 37‍–‍40 | 30‍–‍47 |
| Chicago Cubs | 60 | 94 | .390 | 35 | 33‍–‍44 | 27‍–‍50 |
| Philadelphia Phillies | 59 | 95 | .383 | 36 | 31‍–‍46 | 28‍–‍49 |

=== Tie games ===
4 tie games (1 in AL, 3 in NL), which are not factored into winning percentage or games behind (and were often replayed again) occurred throughout the season.

==== American League ====
The Kansas City Athletics and New York Yankees had one each.

- June 15, New York Yankees vs. Kansas City Athletics, tied at 7 after 12 innings due to rain. Game called after a 30 minute rain delay that began in the bottom of the 13th inning; 13th inning negated. Game rescheduled for August 7.

==== National League ====
The Chicago Cubs and San Francisco Giants had two tie games. The Pittsburgh Pirates and St. Louis Cardinals had one each.

- June 28, Pittsburgh Pirates vs. San Francisco Giants, tied at 7 after nine innings on account of curfew at 12:50 a.m.
- July 4 (game 2), Chicago Cubs vs. San Francisco Giants, tied at 1 after 14 innings on account of darkness.
- September 5 (game 2), Chicago Cubs vs. St. Louis Cardinals, tied at 4 after 10 innings on account of darkness.

== Postseason ==
The postseason began on October 5 and ended on October 13 with the Pittsburgh Pirates defeating the New York Yankees in the 1960 World Series in seven games.

=== Bracket ===
| World Series |
| AL | New York Yankees | 3 |
| NL | Pittsburgh Pirates | 4 |

== Managerial changes ==
=== Off-season ===
| Team | Former Manager | New Manager |
|---|---|---|
| Chicago Cubs | Bob Scheffing | Charlie Grimm |
| Kansas City Athletics | Harry Craft | Bob Elliott |
| Milwaukee Braves | Fred Haney | Chuck Dressen |

=== In-season ===
| Team | Former Manager | New Manager | Notes |
|---|---|---|---|
| Boston Red Sox | Billy Jurges | Del Baker | |
| Boston Red Sox | Del Baker | Pinky Higgins | |
| Chicago Cubs | Charlie Grimm | Lou Boudreau | |
| Cleveland Indians | Joe Gordon | Jo-Jo White | Joe Gordon and Jimmy Dykes exchanged by Indians and Tigers, respectively. |
| Cleveland Indians | Jo-Jo White | Jimmy Dykes | Joe Gordon and Jimmy Dykes exchanged by Indians and Tigers, respectively. |
| Detroit Tigers | Jimmy Dykes | Billy Hitchcock | Joe Gordon and Jimmy Dykes exchanged by Indians and Tigers, respectively. |
| Detroit Tigers | Billy Hitchcock | Joe Gordon | Joe Gordon and Jimmy Dykes exchanged by Indians and Tigers, respectively. |
| Philadelphia Phillies | Eddie Sawyer | Andy Cohen | |
| Philadelphia Phillies | Andy Cohen | Gene Mauch | |
| San Francisco Giants | Bill Rigney | Tom Sheehan | |

== League leaders ==
=== American League ===
Hitting leaders
| Stat | Player | Total |
|---|---|---|
| AVG | Pete Runnels (BOS) | .320 |
| OPS | Mickey Mantle (NYY) | .957 |
| HR | Mickey Mantle (NYY) | 40 |
| RBI | Roger Maris (NYY) | 112 |
| R | Mickey Mantle (NYY) | 119 |
| H | Minnie Miñoso (CWS) | 184 |
| SB | Luis Aparicio (CWS) | 51 |

Pitching leaders
| Stat | Player | Total |
|---|---|---|
| W | Chuck Estrada (BAL); Jim Perry (CLE) | 18 |
| L | Pedro Ramos (WSH) | 18 |
| ERA | Frank Baumann (CWS) | 2.67 |
| K | Jim Bunning (DET) | 201 |
| IP | Frank Lary (DET) | 274.1 |
| SV | Johnny Klippstein (CLE) | 14 |
| WHIP | Hal Brown (BAL) | 1.113 |

=== National League ===
Hitting leaders
| Stat | Player | Total |
|---|---|---|
| AVG | Dick Groat (PIT) | .325 |
| OPS | Frank Robinson (CIN) | 1.002 |
| HR | Ernie Banks (CHC) | 41 |
| RBI | Hank Aaron (MIL) | 126 |
| R | Bill Bruton (MIL) | 112 |
| H | Willie Mays (SF) | 190 |
| SB | Maury Wills (LAD) | 50 |

Pitching leaders
| Stat | Player | Total |
|---|---|---|
| W | Ernie Broglio (STL); Warren Spahn (MIL) | 21 |
| L | Glen Hobbie (CHC) | 20 |
| ERA | Mike McCormick (SF) | 2.70 |
| K | Don Drysdale (LAD) | 246 |
| IP | Larry Jackson (STL) | 282.0 |
| SV | Lindy McDaniel (STL) | 27 |
| WHIP | Don Drysdale (LAD) | 1.063 |

== Milestones ==
=== Batters ===
==== Cycles ====
- Brooks Robinson (BAL):
  - Robinson hit for his first cycle and sixth in franchise history, on July 15 against the Chicago White Sox.
- Bill White (STL):
  - White hit for his first cycle and 11th in franchise history, in game one of a doubleheader on August 14 against the Pittsburgh Pirates.

==== Other batting accomplishments ====
- George Crowe (STL):
  - Set a major league record with 11 pinch-hit home runs on May 25.
- Ted Williams (BOS):
  - Became the fourth player in Major League history to hit 500 home runs in the third inning against the Cleveland Indians on June 17.
  - Becomes the first player in major league history with a stolen base in four consecutive decades (1930s–1960s) when he steals a base on July 22 against the Cleveland Indians. This was the last of 24 stolen bases in Williams' career.

=== Pitchers ===
==== No-hitters ====
- Don Cardwell (CHC/PHI):
  - Cardwell threw his first career no-hitter and eighth no-hitter in franchise history as a part of the Chicago Cubs, by defeating the St. Louis Cardinals 4–0 in game two of a doubleheader on May 15. Wilson walked one and struck out seven.
- Lew Burdette (MIL):
  - Burdette threw his first career no-hitter and ninth no-hitter in franchise history, by defeating the Philadelphia Phillies 1–0 on August 18. Burdette hit one by pitch and struck out three.
- Warren Spahn (MIL):
  - Spahn threw his first career no-hitter and 10th no-hitter in franchise history, by defeating the Philadelphia Phillies 4–0 on September 16. Spahn walked two and struck out 15.

=== Miscellaneous ===
- Stan Musial (STL):
  - Becomes the first major league player to play at two different positions at least 1,000 times, after playing his 1,000th game at first base on April 29. To this point, he played 1,513 games in the outfield.
- Gus Triandos (BAL):
  - Set two American League records on May 4, with three passed balls in one inning (the sixth inning), and four passed balls in one game.
- Joe Ginsberg (CWS/BAL):
  - Tied an American League record with three passed balls in one inning on May 10 as a part of the Baltimore Orioles, previously set just six days earlier.

== Awards and honors ==
=== Regular season ===
Baseball Writers' Association of America Awards
| BBWAA Award | National League | American League |
|---|---|---|
| Rookie of the Year | Frank Howard (LAD) | Ron Hansen (BAL) |
| Cy Young Award | Vern Law (PIT) | — |
| Most Valuable Player | Dick Groat (PIT) | Roger Maris (NYY) |
| Babe Ruth Award (World Series MVP) | Bill Mazeroski (PIT) | — |
Gold Glove Awards
| Position | National League | American League |
| Pitcher | Harvey Haddix (PIT) | Bobby Shantz (NYY) |
| Catcher | Del Crandall (MIL) | Earl Battey (WSH) |
| 1st Base | Bill White (STL) | Vic Power (CLE) |
| 2nd Base | Bill Mazeroski (PIT) | Nellie Fox (CWS) |
| 3rd Base | Ken Boyer (STL) | Brooks Robinson (BAL) |
| Shortstop | Ernie Banks (CHC) | Luis Aparicio (CWS) |
| Left field | Wally Moon (LAD) | Minnie Miñoso (CWS) |
| Center field | Willie Mays (SF) | Jim Landis (CWS) |
| Right field | Hank Aaron (MIL) | Roger Maris (NYY) |

=== Other awards ===
- Sport Magazine's World Series Most Valuable Player Award: Bobby Richardson (NYY)

The Sporting News Awards
| Award | National League | American League |
|---|---|---|
| Player of the Year | Bill Mazeroski (PIT) | — |
| Pitcher of the Year | Vern Law (PIT) | Chuck Estrada (BAL) |
| Fireman of the Year (Relief pitcher) | Lindy McDaniel (STL) | Mike Fornieles (BOS) |
| Rookie of the Year | Frank Howard (LAD) | Ron Hansen (BAL) |
| Manager of the Year | Danny Murtaugh (PIT) | — |
| Executive of the Year | — | George Weiss (NYY) |

=== Monthly awards ===
==== Player of the Month ====
| Month | National League |
|---|---|
| May | Roberto Clemente (PIT) |
| June | Lindy McDaniel (STL) |
| July | Don Drysdale (LAD) |
| August | Warren Spahn (MIL) |
| September | Ken Boyer (STL) |

== Home field attendance ==
| Team name | Wins | %± | Home attendance | %± | Per game |
|---|---|---|---|---|---|
| Los Angeles Dodgers | 82 | −6.8% | 2,253,887 | 8.8% | 29,271 |
| San Francisco Giants | 79 | −4.8% | 1,795,356 | 26.2% | 23,316 |
| Pittsburgh Pirates | 95 | 21.8% | 1,705,828 | 25.4% | 21,870 |
| Chicago White Sox | 87 | −7.4% | 1,644,460 | 15.6% | 21,357 |
| New York Yankees | 97 | 22.8% | 1,627,349 | 4.9% | 21,134 |
| Milwaukee Braves | 88 | 2.3% | 1,497,799 | −14.4% | 19,452 |
| Baltimore Orioles | 89 | 20.3% | 1,187,849 | 33.2% | 15,427 |
| Detroit Tigers | 71 | −6.6% | 1,167,669 | −4.4% | 15,165 |
| Boston Red Sox | 65 | −13.3% | 1,129,866 | 14.8% | 14,674 |
| St. Louis Cardinals | 86 | 21.1% | 1,096,632 | 17.9% | 14,242 |
| Cleveland Indians | 76 | −14.6% | 950,985 | −36.5% | 12,350 |
| Philadelphia Phillies | 59 | −7.8% | 862,205 | 7.4% | 11,197 |
| Chicago Cubs | 60 | −18.9% | 809,770 | −5.6% | 10,250 |
| Kansas City Athletics | 58 | −12.1% | 774,944 | −19.6% | 9,935 |
| Washington Senators | 73 | 15.9% | 743,404 | 20.8% | 9,655 |
| Cincinnati Reds | 67 | −9.5% | 663,486 | −17.2% | 8,617 |

== Umpires ==
American League Umpires
| Name | G | HP | 1B | 2B | 3B | LF | RF | Ref |
|---|---|---|---|---|---|---|---|---|
| Charlie Berry | 152 | 39 | 38 | 37 | 39 | 0 | 0 | |
| Nestor Chylak | 155 | 38 | 37 | 40 | 40 | 0 | 0 | |
| Cal Drummond | 147 | 36 | 38 | 36 | 37 | 0 | 0 | |
| Red Flaherty | 149 | 37 | 37 | 38 | 37 | 0 | 0 | |
| Jim Honochick | 155 | 38 | 40 | 38 | 39 | 0 | 0 | |
| Eddie Hurley | 149 | 38 | 36 | 37 | 38 | 0 | 0 | |
| Bill Kinnamon | 21 | 5 | 6 | 5 | 5 | 0 | 0 | |
| Bill McKinley | 134 | 35 | 32 | 32 | 35 | 0 | 0 | |
| Larry Napp | 152 | 38 | 38 | 39 | 37 | 0 | 0 | |
| Joe Paparella | 160 | 42 | 39 | 39 | 40 | 0 | 0 | |
| John Rice | 157 | 40 | 39 | 37 | 41 | 0 | 0 | |
| Ed Runge | 135 | 34 | 35 | 34 | 32 | 0 | 0 | |
| Harry Schwarts | 21 | 5 | 5 | 6 | 5 | 0 | 0 | |
| Al Smith | 161 | 38 | 42 | 40 | 41 | 0 | 0 | |
| Hank Soar | 152 | 39 | 39 | 36 | 38 | 0 | 0 | |
| Johnny Stevens | 154 | 40 | 40 | 37 | 37 | 0 | 0 | |
| Bob Stewart | 153 | 38 | 38 | 40 | 37 | 0 | 0 | |
| Frank Umont | 152 | 38 | 38 | 37 | 40 | 0 | 0 | |

National League Umpires
| Name | G | HP | 1B | 2B | 3B | LF | RF | Ref |
|---|---|---|---|---|---|---|---|---|
| Al Barlick | 146 | 35 | 36 | 35 | 40 | 0 | 0 | |
| Dusty Boggess | 151 | 40 | 36 | 36 | 39 | 0 | 0 | |
| Ken Burkhart | 160 | 41 | 43 | 35 | 41 | 0 | 0 | |
| Jocko Conlan | 156 | 40 | 36 | 41 | 39 | 0 | 0 | |
| Shag Crawford | 153 | 38 | 40 | 37 | 38 | 0 | 0 | |
| Frank Dascoli | 153 | 37 | 37 | 39 | 40 | 0 | 0 | |
| Augie Donatelli | 160 | 41 | 41 | 37 | 41 | 0 | 0 | |
| Tom Gorman | 154 | 39 | 39 | 36 | 41 | 0 | 0 | |
| Bill Jackowski | 154 | 40 | 41 | 36 | 37 | 0 | 0 | |
| Stan Landes | 154 | 39 | 40 | 38 | 37 | 0 | 0 | |
| Chris Pelekoudas | 153 | 38 | 38 | 38 | 39 | 0 | 0 | |
| Frank Secory | 153 | 41 | 38 | 37 | 37 | 0 | 0 | |
| Vinnie Smith | 152 | 39 | 39 | 38 | 37 | 0 | 0 | |
| Ed Sudol | 152 | 37 | 39 | 41 | 36 | 0 | 0 | |
| Ed Vargo | 156 | 38 | 40 | 39 | 39 | 0 | 0 | |
| Tony Venzon | 153 | 37 | 38 | 40 | 38 | 0 | 0 | |

== Venues ==
The San Francisco Giants open Candlestick Park after playing at Seals Stadium for two seasons. The team would play at the Candlestick Park for 40 seasons through 1999.

The Washington Senators would play their final game at Griffith Stadium on October 2 against the Baltimore Orioles, relocating to Bloomington, Minnesota at Metropolitan Stadium as the Minnesota Twins for the start of the 1961 season.

== Media ==
=== Television ===
CBS and NBC continued to air weekend Game of the Week broadcasts. ABC also returned to MLB broadcasting with a series of afternoon Saturday games. ABC typically did three regional games a week. Two of ABC's games were always from the Eastern or Central Time Zone, while the late game was usually a San Francisco Giants or Los Angeles Dodgers home game.

The All-Star Game and World Series aired on NBC.

== Retired numbers ==
- Ted Williams had his No. 9 retired by the Boston Red Sox in September. This was the first number retired by the team.

== See also ==
- 1960 in baseball (Events, Births, Deaths)
- 1960 Nippon Professional Baseball season
