= Johnny Romano =

American baseball player (1934–2019)

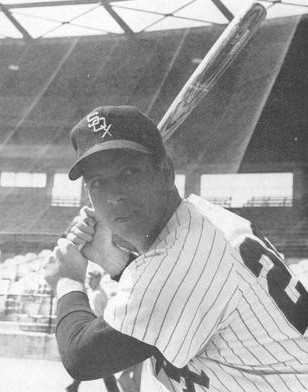
- Catcher
- Born: August 23, 1934; Hoboken, New Jersey, U.S.
- Died: February 24, 2019 (aged 84); Naples, Florida, U.S.
- Batted: Right Threw: Right

MLB debut
- September 12, 1958, for the Chicago White Sox

Last MLB appearance
- August 21, 1967, for the St. Louis Cardinals

MLB statistics
- Batting average: .255
- Home runs: 129
- Runs batted in: 417
- Stats at Baseball Reference

Teams
- Chicago White Sox (1958–1959); Cleveland Indians (1960–1964); Chicago White Sox (1965–1966); St. Louis Cardinals (1967)

Career highlights and awards
- 4× All-Star (1961–1962²)

John Anthony Romano Jr. (August 23, 1934 – February 24, 2019) was an American professional baseball player. He played in Major League Baseball as a catcher for the Chicago White Sox (1958–1959, 1965–1966), Cleveland Indians (1960–1964) and St. Louis Cardinals (1967). He threw and batted right-handed. A four-time All-Star, Romano was considered one of the top catchers in the American League during the early 1960s before injuries prematurely ended his playing career.

== Early life ==
Born and raised in Hoboken, New Jersey, Romano graduated from Demarest High School (now Hoboken High School), where he hit .681 during his senior season, breaking a record that had been held by his older brother, Anthony.

== Professional baseball career ==
Romano was signed by the Chicago White Sox as an amateur free agent in 1954. In 1955, while playing for the Waterloo White Hawks, Romano hit 9 home runs in nine consecutive games. He accumulated 38 home runs with a .321 batting average and led the Illinois–Indiana–Iowa League with 108 runs scored and 124 runs batted in. His 38 home runs in 1955 set a league record.

Romano split the 1956 season between the Vancouver Mounties and the Memphis Chickasaws. In 1957, Romano played for the Indianapolis Indians of the American Association. The Indians' manager was former major league All-Star catcher Walker Cooper, who tutored Romano and helped to greatly improve his catching skills. Romano was called up late in the 1958 season, making his major league debut with the Chicago White Sox on September 12, at the age of 23.

The White Sox' manager, Al López was also a former major league catcher who helped Romano improve his catching skills. Playing as a backup to Sherm Lollar in 1959, Romano hit .294 with 5 home runs and 25 RBIs in 53 games, as the Go-Go White Sox won their first American League Pennant in 40 years. He made one plate appearance as a pinch hitter in the 1959 World Series as the White Sox were defeated by the Los Angeles Dodgers in a six-game series.

Romano was traded to the Cleveland Indians on December 6, 1959, and replaced Russ Nixon as the Indians' starting catcher. In 1960, he produced 16 home runs and 52 runs batted in along with a .272 batting average. He continued to improve in 1961, hitting for a .310 batting average by mid-season to earn the starting catcher's position for the American League team in the 1961 All-Star Games (two All-Star games per year were played in 1961 and 1962). He ended the season with a career-high .299 batting average, eighth highest in the league, along with 21 home runs and 80 runs batted in. Romano had another good year in 1962, hitting 13 home runs by mid-season, and was selected as a reserve catcher for the American League in the 1962 All-Star Games. He ended the season with career-highs of 25 home runs and 81 runs batted in.

On May 26, 1963, Romano fractured his little finger while making a tag at home plate. He tried to return to play too soon, and the injury never healed correctly and affected his batting. Romano missed 40 games that year and his batting average would drop to .216. In 1964, he platooned alongside catcher Joe Azcue, hitting .241 with 19 home runs. He was traded back to the White Sox on January 20, 1965, as the White Sox sought more offensive production from the catcher's position.

Romano had a productive season in 1965 with the White Sox, hitting 18 home runs with a respectable .355 on-base percentage in cavernous Comiskey Park. He also helped guide the White Sox pitching staff to finish second in the league in team earned run average and in shutouts as, the White Sox won 95 games to finish the season in second place behind the Minnesota Twins. Romano followed this performance with 15 home runs and a .344 on-base percentage in 1966 as he guided the White Sox pitching staff to lead the league in earned run average and in shutouts.

On December 14, 1966, the White Sox traded Romano along with Leland White to the St. Louis Cardinals for Don Dennis and Walt Williams. He played one final season as a backup catcher for Tim McCarver in 1967. He hit for a .121 batting average in 24 games for the Cardinals as they won the 1967 National League pennant. They also captured the 1967 World Series title, but Romano was not on the postseason roster and was released on October 20, 1967.

== Career statistics ==
In a ten-year major league career, Romano played in 905 games, accumulating 706 hits in 2,767 at bats for a .255 career batting average along with 129 home runs, 417 runs batted in and a .354 on-base percentage. A good defensive player, he ended his career with a .990 fielding percentage. Romano led American League catchers once in baserunners caught stealing, once in assists and once in range factor. At the time of his retirement, he held three team records for Indians catchers with most career home runs (91), most home runs in a season (25) and most RBIs in a season (81).

== Death ==
Romano died on February 24, 2019, at the age of 84.
