= 1961 Los Angeles Angels season =

Major League Baseball season

1961 Los Angeles Angels
- League: American League
- Ballpark: Wrigley Field
- City: Los Angeles, California
- Record: 70–91 (.435)
- League place: 8th
- Owner: Gene Autry
- General manager: Fred Haney
- Manager: Bill Rigney
- Television: KHJ
- Radio: KMPC (Bob Kelley, Don Wells, Steve Bailey)
- Stats: ESPN.com; Baseball Reference

The 1961 Los Angeles Angels season was the 1st season of the Angels franchise in the American League, the 1st in Los Angeles, and their only season playing their home games at Wrigley Field. The Angels finished the season eighth in the American League with a record of 70–91, 38 1/2 games behind the World Champion New York Yankees. The team's .435 winning percentage remains the best of any expansion team's first season in MLB history. It was the Angels' first season in franchise history, and their only season at Wrigley Field in Los Angeles. Gene Autry owned the franchise, which was created as a counterpart to the Los Angeles Dodgers, and the two teams would even share the same stadium the following year when the Angels moved to Dodger Stadium (referring to as Chavez Ravine Stadium).

== Offseason ==
The Angels, along with the new Washington Senators, were the first ever American League expansion teams. Both teams participated in Major League Baseball's first ever expansion draft. The Angels had the first pick in the 1960 Major League Baseball expansion draft, which they used to select Eli Grba from the New York Yankees. Grba wound up playing two-plus seasons for Los Angeles before returning to the minor leagues.

=== Notable transactions ===
- December 14, 1960: 1960 Major League Baseball expansion draft
  - Jim Fregosi was drafted by the Angels from the Boston Red Sox.
  - Bob Cerv was drafted by the Angels from the New York Yankees.
  - Steve Bilko was drafted by the Angels from the Detroit Tigers.
  - Earl Averill, Jr. was drafted by the Angels from the Chicago White Sox.
  - Jim McAnany was drafted by the Angels from the Chicago White Sox.
- December 29, 1960: Del Rice was signed as a free agent by the Angels.

== Regular season ==
As an expansion team, the Angels were not expected to do well. However, they not only finished ahead of the Senators, but also the Kansas City A's, who tied the Senators for last place, nine games behind Los Angeles.

=== Season standings ===
American League
| Team | W | L | Pct. | GB | Home | Road |
|---|---|---|---|---|---|---|
| New York Yankees | 109 | 53 | .673 | — | 65‍–‍16 | 44‍–‍37 |
| Detroit Tigers | 101 | 61 | .623 | 8 | 50‍–‍31 | 51‍–‍30 |
| Baltimore Orioles | 95 | 67 | .586 | 14 | 48‍–‍33 | 47‍–‍34 |
| Chicago White Sox | 86 | 76 | .531 | 23 | 53‍–‍28 | 33‍–‍48 |
| Cleveland Indians | 78 | 83 | .484 | 30½ | 40‍–‍41 | 38‍–‍42 |
| Boston Red Sox | 76 | 86 | .469 | 33 | 50‍–‍31 | 26‍–‍55 |
| Minnesota Twins | 70 | 90 | .438 | 38 | 36‍–‍44 | 34‍–‍46 |
| Los Angeles Angels | 70 | 91 | .435 | 38½ | 46‍–‍36 | 24‍–‍55 |
| Kansas City Athletics | 61 | 100 | .379 | 47½ | 33‍–‍47 | 28‍–‍53 |
| Washington Senators | 61 | 100 | .379 | 47½ | 33‍–‍46 | 28‍–‍54 |

=== Opening Day starting lineup ===
The first game in franchise history took place at Memorial Stadium, Baltimore, on Tuesday, April 11, 1961. Powered by Ted Kluszewski's first- and second-inning home runs, which accounted for five runs, and Grba's complete game six-hitter, the Angels defeated the Baltimore Orioles, 7–2. They would then lose eight games in a row, including their home opener April 27 against the Minnesota Twins at Wrigley Field, Los Angeles.

| 10 | Eddie Yost | 3B |
| 11 | Ken Aspromonte | 2B |
| 28 | Albie Pearson | RF |
| 15 | Ted Kluszewski | 1B |
| 30 | Bob Cerv | LF |
| 26 | Ken Hunt | CF |
| 16 | Fritz Brickell | SS |
| 9 | Del Rice | C |
| 33 | Eli Grba | P |

=== Record vs. opponents ===
1961 American League record Sources:
| Team | BAL | BOS | CWS | CLE | DET | KCA | LAA | MIN | NYY | WAS |
|---|---|---|---|---|---|---|---|---|---|---|
| Baltimore | — | 11–7 | 11–7 | 9–9 | 9–9 | 13–5 | 8–10 | 11–7 | 9–9–1 | 14–4 |
| Boston | 7–11 | — | 9–9 | 5–13 | 8–10 | 10–8 | 11–7–1 | 11–7 | 5–13 | 10–8 |
| Chicago | 7–11 | 9–9 | — | 12–6 | 6–12 | 14–4 | 10–8 | 9–9–1 | 6–12 | 13–5 |
| Cleveland | 9–9 | 13–5 | 6–12 | — | 6–12 | 8–9 | 10–8 | 10–8 | 4–14 | 12–6 |
| Detroit | 9–9 | 10–8 | 12–6 | 12–6 | — | 12–6–1 | 14–4 | 11–7 | 8–10 | 13–5 |
| Kansas City | 5–13 | 8–10 | 4–14 | 9–8 | 6–12–1 | — | 9–9 | 7–11 | 4–14 | 9–9 |
| Los Angeles | 10–8 | 7–11–1 | 8–10 | 8–10 | 4–14 | 9–9 | — | 8–9 | 6–12 | 10–8 |
| Minnesota | 7–11 | 7–11 | 9–9–1 | 8–10 | 7–11 | 11–7 | 9–8 | — | 4–14 | 8–9 |
| New York | 9–9–1 | 13–5 | 12–6 | 14–4 | 10–8 | 14–4 | 12–6 | 14–4 | — | 11–7 |
| Washington | 4–14 | 8–10 | 5–13 | 6–12 | 5–13 | 9–9 | 8–10 | 9–8 | 7–11 | — |

=== Offense ===
The Angels were no stranger to offense in their first season, with five players hitting 20 or more home runs, a mark which at the time was considered a remarkable feat. Leon Wagner, who led the team with 28 home runs, was one of the team's best offensive threats, also leading the team by slugging .517. The other players who hit 20 home runs were Ken Hunt (25), Lee Thomas (24), Earl Averill, Jr. (21), and Steve Bilko (20). Albie Pearson, who led the team in batting average, had an on-base percentage of .420, also a mark that was considered more valuable than the current game. Pearson led the team in several other offensive categories, leading the team in stolen bases (11), runs (92), and walks (96). Lee Thomas, who ended the season second on the team in batting at .284, led the team in hits, with 128, edging out Wagner by 1 hit. The Angels 189 home runs were second in all of baseball in 1961, and their 744 runs was good enough for 5th in all of baseball. They led all of baseball with 681 walks.

=== Pitching ===
Ken McBride, who led the team with 12 wins, also led the team with 15 losses. Eli Grba had an 11–13 record, good enough for second in both wins and losses amongst the team's pitchers. Ted Bowsfield was the Angels' only starter with a winning record, going 11–8. McBride had 180 strikeouts, 75 more than Grba, who was second on the team with 105. As a team, the Angels led the American League, throwing more strikeouts than any of the other 9 teams. Art Fowler and Tom Morgan were the Angels' top two in saves, with 11 and 10, respectively, leading the team to finish second in the American League in that category.

=== Notable transactions ===
- April 1, 1961: Jim McAnany was traded by the Angels to the Chicago Cubs for Lou Johnson.
- April 7, 1961: Ray Semproch was purchased by the Angels from the Washington Senators.
- May 8, 1961: Bob Cerv and Tex Clevenger were traded by the Angels to the New York Yankees for Lee Thomas, Ryne Duren, and Johnny James.
- May 26, 1961: Art Fowler was purchased by the Angels from the Los Angeles Dodgers.
- July 22, 1961: Tom Satriano was signed as an amateur free agent by the Angels.
- September 8, 1961: Chuck Tanner was purchased by the Angels from the Dallas-Fort Worth Rangers.

=== Roster ===
1961 Los Angeles Angels
Roster
| Pitchers: 43 Ted Bowsfield; 40 Jerry Casale; 31 Dean Chance; 32 Tex Clevenger; 40 Jim Donohue; 30 Ryne Duren; 24 Art Fowler; 31 Ned Garver; 33 Eli Grba; 46 Russ Heman; 22 Johnny James; 41 Ron Kline; 37 Ken McBride; 39 Ron Moeller; 47 Tom Morgan; 35 Ray Semproch; 41 Jack Spring; 17 Bob Sprout | Catchers: 8 Earl Averill; 9 Del Rice; 7 Buck Rodgers; 6 Ed Sadowski; Infielders: 35 Dan Ardell; 11 Ken Aspromonte; 17 Julio Bécquer; 20 Steve Bilko; 16 Fritz Brickell; 21 Rocky Bridges; 16 Jim Fregosi; 12 Ken Hamlin; 15 Ted Kluszewski; 1 Joe Koppe; 14 Gene Leek; 12 Billy Moran; 29 Tom Satriano; 10 Eddie Yost | Outfielders: 30 Bob Cerv; 26 Ken Hunt; 27 Lou Johnson; 28 Albie Pearson; 11 Chuck Tanner; 4 George Thomas; 32 Lee Thomas; 29 Faye Throneberry; 27 Leon Wagner; Other batters: 22 Leo Burke | Manager: 18 Bill Rigney; Coaches: 3 Bob Elliott (First base); 5 Marv Grissom (Pitching); 2 Red Kress (Third base); 48 Jack Paepke (Bullpen) |

== Player stats ==
| = Indicates team leader |

=== Batting ===
==== Starters by position ====
Note: Pos = Position; G = Games played; AB = At bats; H = Hits; Avg. = Batting average; HR = Home runs; RBI = Runs batted in

| Pos | Player | G | AB | H | Avg. | HR | RBI |
|---|---|---|---|---|---|---|---|
| C | Earl Averill | 115 | 323 | 86 | .266 | 21 | 59 |
| 1B | Steve Bilko | 114 | 294 | 82 | .279 | 20 | 59 |
| 2B | Ken Aspromonte | 66 | 238 | 53 | .223 | 2 | 14 |
| SS | Joe Koppe | 91 | 338 | 85 | .251 | 5 | 40 |
| 3B | Eddie Yost | 76 | 213 | 43 | .202 | 3 | 15 |
| LF | Leon Wagner | 133 | 453 | 127 | .280 | 28 | 79 |
| CF | Ken Hunt | 149 | 479 | 122 | .255 | 25 | 84 |
| RF | Albie Pearson | 144 | 427 | 123 | .288 | 7 | 41 |

==== Other batters ====
Note: G = Games played; AB = At bats; H = Hits; Avg. = Batting average; HR = Home runs; RBI = Runs batted in

| Player | G | AB | H | Avg. | HR | RBI |
|---|---|---|---|---|---|---|
| Lee Thomas | 130 | 450 | 128 | .284 | 24 | 70 |
| George Thomas | 79 | 282 | 79 | .280 | 13 | 59 |
| Ted Kluszewski | 107 | 263 | 64 | .243 | 15 | 39 |
| Rocky Bridges | 84 | 229 | 55 | .240 | 2 | 15 |
| Gene Leek | 57 | 199 | 45 | .226 | 5 | 20 |
| Billy Moran | 54 | 173 | 45 | .260 | 2 | 22 |
| Ed Sadowski | 69 | 164 | 38 | .232 | 4 | 12 |
| Tom Satriano | 35 | 96 | 19 | .198 | 1 | 8 |
| Ken Hamlin | 42 | 91 | 19 | .209 | 1 | 5 |
| Del Rice | 44 | 83 | 20 | .241 | 4 | 11 |
| Bob Cerv | 18 | 57 | 9 | .158 | 2 | 6 |
| Buck Rodgers | 16 | 56 | 18 | .321 | 2 | 13 |
| Fritz Brickell | 21 | 49 | 6 | .122 | 0 | 3 |
| Faye Throneberry | 24 | 31 | 6 | .194 | 0 | 0 |
| Jim Fregosi | 11 | 27 | 6 | .222 | 0 | 3 |
| Chuck Tanner | 7 | 8 | 1 | .125 | 0 | 0 |
| Julio Bécquer | 11 | 8 | 0 | .000 | 0 | 0 |
| Leo Burke | 6 | 5 | 0 | .000 | 0 | 0 |
| Dan Ardell | 7 | 4 | 1 | .250 | 0 | 0 |
| Lou Johnson | 1 | 0 | 0 | ---- | 0 | 0 |

=== Pitching ===
==== Starting pitchers ====
Note: G = Games pitched; IP = Innings pitched; W = Wins; L = Losses; ERA = Earned run average; SO = Strikeouts

| Player | G | IP | W | L | ERA | SO |
|---|---|---|---|---|---|---|
| Ken McBride | 38 | 241.2 | 12 | 15 | 3.65 | 180 |
| Eli Grba | 40 | 211.2 | 11 | 13 | 4.25 | 105 |
| Dean Chance | 5 | 18.1 | 0 | 2 | 6.87 | 11 |
| Bob Sprout | 1 | 4.0 | 0 | 0 | 4.50 | 2 |

==== Other pitchers ====
Note: G = Games pitched; IP = Innings pitched; W = Wins; L = Losses; ERA = Earned run average; SO = Strikeouts

| Player | G | IP | W | L | ERA | SO |
|---|---|---|---|---|---|---|
| Ted Bowsfield | 41 | 157.0 | 11 | 8 | 3.73 | 88 |
| Ron Moeller | 33 | 112.2 | 4 | 8 | 5.83 | 87 |
| Ron Kline | 26 | 104.2 | 3 | 6 | 4.90 | 70 |
| Jim Donohue | 38 | 100.1 | 4 | 6 | 4.31 | 79 |
| Ryne Duren | 40 | 99.0 | 6 | 12 | 5.18 | 108 |
| Jerry Casale | 13 | 42.2 | 1 | 5 | 6.54 | 35 |
| Jack Spring | 18 | 38.0 | 3 | 0 | 4.26 | 27 |
| Ned Garver | 12 | 29.0 | 0 | 3 | 5.59 | 9 |

==== Relief pitchers ====
Note: G = Games pitched; W = Wins; L = Losses; SV = Saves; ERA = Earned run average; SO = Strikeouts

| Player | G | W | L | SV | ERA | SO |
|---|---|---|---|---|---|---|
| Art Fowler | 53 | 5 | 8 | 11 | 3.64 | 78 |
| Tom Morgan | 59 | 8 | 2 | 10 | 2.36 | 39 |
| Jim Donohue | 38 | 4 | 6 | 5 | 4.31 | 79 |
| Johnny James | 36 | 0 | 2 | 0 | 5.30 | 41 |
| Tex Clevenger | 12 | 2 | 1 | 1 | 1.69 | 11 |
| Russ Heman | 6 | 0 | 0 | 0 | 1.80 | 2 |
| Ray Semproch | 2 | 0 | 0 | 0 | 9.00 | 1 |

== Farm system ==
| Level | Team | League | Manager |
|---|---|---|---|
| AAA | Dallas-Fort Worth Rangers | American Association | Walker Cooper |
| D | Statesville Owls | Western Carolinas League | George Wilson |

Records
| Preceded by None | Los Angeles Angels seasons 1961 | Succeeded by 1962 |
