= 1961 Cleveland Indians season =

1961 Cleveland Indians
- League: American League
- Ballpark: Cleveland Municipal Stadium
- City: Cleveland, Ohio
- Record: 78–83 (.484)
- League place: 5th
- Owners: William R. Daley
- General managers: Frank Lane, Gabe Paul
- Managers: Jimmy Dykes
- Television: WJW-TV (Ken Coleman, Harry Jones)
- Radio: WERE (Jimmy Dudley, Bob Neal)

The 1961 Cleveland Indians season was a season in American baseball. The team finished fifth in the newly expanded 10-team American League with a record of 78–83, 30 1/2 games behind the New York Yankees. Although the 1961 season ended up being a disappointment, the Indians had a brief flurry of pennant fever early in the 1961 season. After starting 12–13, the Indians started to streak, going 22–4 over their next 26 games to reach a record of 34–17 (were 38–20 after 58 games). However the Indians cooled off afterwards and were quickly knocked out of first place, as they went 44–66 the rest of the year. For the second year in a row, the Indians had held first place in June, only to slump to a losing record. This would happen again in 1962 as well (47–34 start in early July).

== Offseason ==
- December 14, 1960: 1960 MLB expansion draft
  - Marty Keough was drafted from the Indians by the Washington Senators.
  - Jim King was drafted from the Indians by the Washington Senators.
- December 27, 1960: Paul Casanova was signed as a free agent by the Indians.

== Regular season ==
=== Season standings ===
American League
Team	W	L	Pct.	GB	Home	Road
New York Yankees	109	53	.673	—	65‍–‍16	44‍–‍37
Detroit Tigers	101	61	.623	8	50‍–‍31	51‍–‍30
Baltimore Orioles	95	67	.586	14	48‍–‍33	47‍–‍34
Chicago White Sox	86	76	.531	23	53‍–‍28	33‍–‍48
Cleveland Indians	78	83	.484	30½	40‍–‍41	38‍–‍42
Boston Red Sox	76	86	.469	33	50‍–‍31	26‍–‍55
Minnesota Twins	70	90	.438	38	36‍–‍44	34‍–‍46
Los Angeles Angels	70	91	.435	38½	46‍–‍36	24‍–‍55
Kansas City Athletics	61	100	.379	47½	33‍–‍47	28‍–‍53
Washington Senators	61	100	.379	47½	33‍–‍46	28‍–‍54

=== Record vs. opponents ===
1961 American League record Sources:
Team	BAL	BOS	CWS	CLE	DET	KCA	LAA	MIN	NYY	WAS
Baltimore	—	11–7	11–7	9–9	9–9	13–5	8–10	11–7	9–9–1	14–4
Boston	7–11	—	9–9	5–13	8–10	10–8	11–7–1	11–7	5–13	10–8
Chicago	7–11	9–9	—	12–6	6–12	14–4	10–8	9–9–1	6–12	13–5
Cleveland	9–9	13–5	6–12	—	6–12	8–9	10–8	10–8	4–14	12–6
Detroit	9–9	10–8	12–6	12–6	—	12–6–1	14–4	11–7	8–10	13–5
Kansas City	5–13	8–10	4–14	9–8	6–12–1	—	9–9	7–11	4–14	9–9
Los Angeles	10–8	7–11–1	8–10	8–10	4–14	9–9	—	8–9	6–12	10–8
Minnesota	7–11	7–11	9–9–1	8–10	7–11	11–7	9–8	—	4–14	8–9
New York	9–9–1	13–5	12–6	14–4	10–8	14–4	12–6	14–4	—	11–7
Washington	4–14	8–10	5–13	6–12	5–13	9–9	8–10	9–8	7–11	—

=== Notable transactions ===
- April 23, 1961: Paul Casanova was released by the Indians.
- May 10, 1961: Joe Morgan, a player to be named later and cash were traded by the Indians to the St. Louis Cardinals for Bob Nieman. The Indians completed the deal by sending Mike Lee to the Cardinals on June 1.
- June 12, 1961: Tommy John was signed as an amateur free agent by the Indians.
- October 5, 1961: Jimmy Piersall was traded by the Indians to the Washington Senators for Dick Donovan, Gene Green, and Jim Mahoney.

=== Opening Day Lineup ===
Opening Day Starters
#	Name	Position
16	Johnny Temple	2B
14	Tito Francona	LF
37	Jimmy Piersall	CF
8	Willie Kirkland	RF
3	Woodie Held	SS
10	Vic Power	1B
5	Bubba Phillips	3B
11	Johnny Romano	C
31	Jim Perry	P

=== Roster ===
1961 Cleveland Indians
Roster
Pitchers: 24 Bob Allen; 23 Johnny Antonelli; 39 Gary Bell; 27 Bill Dailey; 38 Frank Funk; 33 Mudcat Grant; 27 Steve Hamilton; 34 Wynn Hawkins; 20 Russ Heman; 18 Barry Latman; 29 Bobby Locke; 17 Sam McDowell; 31 Jim Perry; 23 Joe Schaffernoth; 22 Dick Stigman	Catchers: 11 Johnny Romano; 15 Valmy Thomas; Infielders: 2 Ken Aspromonte; 1,7 Mike de la Hoz; 3 Woodie Held; 7 Hal Jones; 6 Jack Kubiszyn; 5 Bubba Phillips; 10 Vic Power; 16 Johnny Temple	Outfielders: 12 Walt Bond; 9 Ty Cline; 36 Don Dillard; 30 Chuck Essegian; 14 Tito Francona; 8 Willie Kirkland; 32 Al Luplow; 4 Joe Morgan; 4 Bob Nieman; 37 Jimmy Piersall; Other batters: 9 Bob Hale	Manager: 35 Jimmy Dykes (Apr 11 - Sep 30); 43 Mel Harder (Oct 1); Coaches: 40 Luke Appling (Third Base); 43 Mel Harder (Pitching); 45 Allen Jones (Bullpen catcher); 42 Mel McGaha (First Base)

== Player stats ==
= Indicates team leader

=== Batting ===
==== Starters by position ====
Note: Pos = Position; G = Games played; AB = At bats; H = Hits; Avg. = Batting average; HR = Home runs; RBI = Runs batted in

Pos	Player	G	AB	H	Avg.	HR	RBI
C	Johnny Romano	142	509	152	.299	21	80
1B	Vic Power	147	563	151	.268	5	63
2B	Johnny Temple	129	518	143	.276	3	30
SS	Woodie Held	146	509	136	.267	23	78
3B	Bubba Phillips	143	546	144	.264	18	72
LF	Tito Francona	155	592	178	.301	16	85
CF	Jimmy Piersall	121	484	156	.322	6	40
RF	Willie Kirkland	146	525	136	.259	27	95

==== Other batters ====
Note: G = Games played; AB = At bats; H = Hits; Avg. = Batting average; HR = Home runs; RBI = Runs batted in

Player	G	AB	H	Avg.	HR	RBI
Mike de la Hoz	61	173	45	.260	3	23
Chuck Essegian	60	166	48	.289	12	35
Don Dillard	74	147	40	.272	7	17
Valmy Thomas	27	86	18	.209	2	6
Ken Aspromonte	22	70	16	.229	0	5
Bob Nieman	39	65	23	.354	2	10
Walt Bond	38	52	9	.173	2	7
Ty Cline	12	43	9	.209	0	1
Jack Kubiszyn	25	42	9	.214	0	0
Bob Hale	42	36	6	.167	0	6
Hal Jones	12	35	6	.171	2	4
Al Luplow	5	18	1	.056	0	0
Joe Morgan	4	10	2	.200	0	0

=== Pitching ===
==== Starting pitchers ====
Note: G = Games pitched; IP = Innings pitched; W = Wins; L = Losses; ERA = Earned run average; SO = Strikeouts

Player	G	IP	W	L	ERA	SO
Mudcat Grant	35	244.2	15	9	3.86	146
Gary Bell	34	228.1	12	16	4.10	163
Jim Perry	35	223.2	10	17	4.71	90
Wynn Hawkins	30	133.0	7	9	4.06	51
Sam McDowell	1	6.1	0	0	0.00	5

==== Other pitchers ====
Note: G = Games pitched; IP = Innings pitched; W = Wins; L = Losses; ERA = Earned run average; SO = Strikeouts

Player	G	IP	W	L	ERA	SO
Barry Latman	45	176.2	13	5	4.02	108
Dick Stigman	22	64.1	2	5	4.62	48
Johnny Antonelli	11	48.0	0	4	6.56	23

==== Relief pitchers ====
Note: G = Games pitched; W = Wins; L = Losses; SV = Saves; ERA = Earned run average; SO = Strikeouts

Player	G	W	L	SV	ERA	SO
Frank Funk	56	11	11	11	3.31	64
Bob Allen	48	3	2	3	3.75	42
Bobby Locke	37	4	4	2	4.53	37
Joe Schaffernoth	15	0	1	0	4.76	9
Bill Dailey	12	1	0	0	0.95	7
Russ Heman	6	0	0	1	3.60	4
Steve Hamilton	2	0	0	0	3.00	4

== Awards and honors ==
All-Star Game

- Johnny Romano, Catcher, Starter (both games)
- Johnny Temple, Second Base, Starter (both games)
- Jim Perry, Pitcher, Reserve (first game)
- Barry Latman, Pitcher, Reserve (second game)

== Farm system ==
Level	Team	League	Manager
AAA	Salt Lake City Bees	Pacific Coast League	Herman Franks and Fred Fitzsimmons
A	Reading Indians	Eastern League	Ray Mueller
B	Burlington Indians	Carolina League	Bill Herring and Walt Novick
D	Selma Cloverleafs	Alabama–Florida League	Walt Novick and Joe Morlan
D	Dubuque Packers	Midwest League	Pinky May

LEAGUE CHAMPIONS: Selma
