= 1963 Washington Senators season =

1963 Washington Senators
- League: American League
- Ballpark: D.C. Stadium
- City: Washington, D.C.
- Record: 56–106 (.347)
- League place: 10th
- Owners: James M. Johnston and James H. Lemon
- General managers: George Selkirk
- Managers: Mickey Vernon, Eddie Yost, Gil Hodges
- Television: WTOP
- Radio: WTOP (Dan Daniels, John MacLean)

The 1963 Washington Senators season involved the Senators finishing tenth in the American League (in last place) with a record of 56 wins and 106 losses.

== Offseason ==
- October 5, 1962: Paul Casanova was signed as a free agent by the Senators.
- November 26, 1962: 1962 first-year draft
  - Lou Piniella was drafted by the Senators from the Cleveland Indians.
  - Brant Alyea was drafted by the Senators from the Cincinnati Reds.
- Prior to 1963 season: Lou Klimchock was acquired by the Senators from the Milwaukee Braves.

== Regular season ==
- September 2, 1963: Ed Hobaugh hit a home run in the last at bat of his career.

=== Season standings ===
American League
Team	W	L	Pct.	GB	Home	Road
New York Yankees	104	57	.646	—	58‍–‍22	46‍–‍35
Chicago White Sox	94	68	.580	10½	49‍–‍33	45‍–‍35
Minnesota Twins	91	70	.565	13	48‍–‍33	43‍–‍37
Baltimore Orioles	86	76	.531	18½	48‍–‍33	38‍–‍43
Cleveland Indians	79	83	.488	25½	41‍–‍40	38‍–‍43
Detroit Tigers	79	83	.488	25½	47‍–‍34	32‍–‍49
Boston Red Sox	76	85	.472	28	44‍–‍36	32‍–‍49
Kansas City Athletics	73	89	.451	31½	36‍–‍45	37‍–‍44
Los Angeles Angels	70	91	.435	34	39‍–‍42	31‍–‍49
Washington Senators	56	106	.346	48½	31‍–‍49	25‍–‍57

=== Record vs. opponents ===
1963 American League record Sources:
Team	BAL	BOS	CWS	CLE	DET	KCA	LAA	MIN	NYY	WAS
Baltimore	—	7–11	7–11	10–8	13–5	9–9	9–9	9–9	7–11	15–3
Boston	11–7	—	8–10	10–8	9–9	7–11	9–8	7–11	6–12	9–9
Chicago	11–7	10–8	—	11–7	11–7	12–6	10–8	8–10	8–10	13–5
Cleveland	8–10	8–10	7–11	—	10–8	11–7	10–8	5–13	7–11	13–5
Detroit	5–13	9–9	7–11	8–10	—	13–5	12–6	8–10	8–10	9–9
Kansas City	9–9	11–7	6–12	7–11	5–13	—	10–8	9–9	6–12	10–8
Los Angeles	9–9	8–9	8–10	8–10	6–12	8–10	—	9–9	5–13	9–9
Minnesota	9–9	11–7	10–8	13–5	10–8	9–9	9–9	—	6–11	14–4
New York	11–7	12–6	10–8	11–7	10–8	12–6	13–5	11–6	—	14–4
Washington	3–15	9–9	5–13	5–13	9–9	8–10	9–9	4–14	4–14	—

=== Notable transactions ===
- April 2, 1963: Minnie Miñoso was purchased by the Senators from the St. Louis Cardinals.
- May 6, 1963: Lou Klimchock was returned by the Senators to the Milwaukee Braves.
- May 8, 1963: Hobie Landrith was purchased by the Senators from the Baltimore Orioles.
- May 23, 1963: Jimmy Piersall was traded by the Senators to the New York Mets for Gil Hodges.
- June 24, 1963: Don Zimmer was purchased by the Senators from the Los Angeles Dodgers.

=== Roster ===
1963 Washington Senators
Roster
Pitchers: 8,36 Bob Baird; 26,39 Carl Bouldin; 39 Jim Bronstad; 18 Pete Burnside; 23 Tom Cheney; 28 Jim Coates; 21 Bennie Daniels; 17 Jim Duckworth; 28 Steve Hamilton; 19,26 Jim Hannan; 36 Ed Hobaugh; 22 Jack Jenkins; 27 Ron Kline; 16 Ron Moeller; 24 Claude Osteen; 22 Art Quirk; 28 Steve Ridzik; 37 Ed Roebuck; 33 Don Rudolph; 15 Dave Stenhouse	Catchers: 5 Hobie Landrith; 10 Don Leppert; 3 Cal Neeman; 14,6 Ken Retzer; 8 Bob Schmidt; Infielders: 12 Don Blasingame; 1 Marv Breeding; 11 Ed Brinkman; 7 Chuck Cottier; 36,2 John Kennedy; 34 Lou Klimchock; 25 Bobo Osborne; 29 Dick Phillips; 34 Don Zimmer	Outfielders: 12,1 Tom Brown; 32 Chuck Hinton; 20 Ken Hunt; 30 Jim King; 4 Don Lock; 9 Minnie Miñoso; 37 Jimmy Piersall; Other batters: 6 Johnny Schaive; 2 Barry Shetrone	Manager: 3 Mickey Vernon; 14 Gil Hodges; Coaches: 41 George Case; 40 Sid Hudson; 41 Danny O'Connell; 43 George Susce; 42 Eddie Yost

== Player stats ==
= Indicates team leader

=== Batting ===
==== Starters by position ====
Note: Pos = Position; G = Games played; AB = At bats; H = Hits; Avg. = Batting average; HR = Home runs; RBI = Runs batted in

Pos	Player	G	AB	H	Avg.	HR	RBI
C	Ken Retzer	95	265	64	.242	5	31
1B	Bobo Osborne	125	358	76	.212	12	44
2B	Chuck Cottier	113	337	69	.205	5	21
SS	Ed Brinkman	145	514	117	.228	7	45
3B	Don Zimmer	83	298	74	.248	13	44
LF	Chuck Hinton	150	566	152	.269	15	55
CF	Don Lock	149	531	134	.252	27	82
RF	Jim King	136	459	106	.231	24	62

==== Other batters ====
Note: G = Games played; AB = At bats; H = Hits; Avg. = Batting average; HR = Home runs; RBI = Runs batted in

Player	G	AB	H	Avg.	HR	RBI
Dick Phillips	124	321	76	.237	10	32
Minnie Miñoso	109	315	72	.229	4	30
Don Blasingame	69	254	65	.256	2	12
Don Leppert	73	211	50	.237	6	24
Marv Breeding	58	197	54	.274	1	14
Tom Brown	61	116	17	.147	1	4
Hobie Landrith	42	103	18	.175	1	7
Jim Piersall	29	94	23	.245	1	5
John Kennedy	36	62	11	.177	0	4
Ken Hunt	7	20	4	.200	1	4
Cal Neeman	14	18	1	.056	0	0
Bob Schmidt	9	15	3	.200	0	0
Lou Klimchock	9	14	2	.143	0	2
Johnny Schaive	3	3	0	.000	0	0
Barry Shetrone	2	2	0	.000	0	0

=== Pitching ===
==== Starting pitchers ====
Note: G = Games pitched; IP = Innings pitched; W = Wins; L = Losses; ERA = Earned run average; SO = Strikeouts

Player	G	IP	W	L	ERA	SO
Claude Osteen	40	212.1	9	14	3.35	109
Don Rudolph	37	174.0	7	19	4.55	70
Tom Cheney	23	136.1	8	9	2.71	97
Dave Stenhouse	16	87.0	3	9	4.55	47

==== Other pitchers ====
Note: G = Games pitched; IP = Innings pitched; W = Wins; L = Losses; ERA = Earned run average; SO = Strikeouts

Player	G	IP	W	L	ERA	SO
Bennie Daniels	35	168.2	5	10	4.38	88
Jim Duckworth	37	120.2	4	12	6.04	66
Steve Ridzik	20	89.2	5	6	4.82	47
Jim Hannan	13	27.2	2	2	4.88	14
Ron Moeller	8	24.1	2	0	6.29	10
Carl Bouldin	10	23.1	2	2	5.79	10
Art Quirk	7	21.0	1	0	4.29	12
Ed Hobaugh	9	16.0	0	0	6.19	11
Jack Jenkins	4	12.1	0	2	5.84	5
Bob Baird	5	11.2	0	3	7.71	7

==== Relief pitchers ====
Note: G = Games pitched; W = Wins; L = Losses; SV = Saves; ERA = Earned run average; SO = Strikeouts

Player	G	W	L	SV	ERA	SO
Ron Kline	62	3	8	17	2.79	49
Pete Burnside	38	0	1	0	6.15	23
Ed Roebuck	26	2	1	4	3.30	25
Jim Bronstad	25	1	3	1	5.65	22
Jim Coates	20	2	4	0	5.28	31
Steve Hamilton	3	0	1	0	13.50	1

== Awards and honors ==
All-Star Game

- Don Leppert, reserve

== Farm system ==
Level	Team	League	Manager
AA	York White Roses	Eastern League	Danny O'Connell and Johnny Schaive
A	Peninsula Senators	Carolina League	Archie Wilson
A	Wisconsin Rapids Senators	Midwest League	Wayne Terwilliger
A	Geneva Senators	New York–Penn League	Owen Friend
