= Chapman Township, Nebraska =

Chapman Township, Nebraska may refer to the following places in Nebraska:

- Chapman Township, Merrick County, Nebraska
- Chapman Township, Saunders County, Nebraska

== See also ==
- Chapman Township (disambiguation)
