= Satriano (surname) =

Satriano is a surname. Notable people with the surname include:

- Antonio Satriano (born 2003), Italian footballer
- Gina Satriano, Assistant District Attorney in the Los Angeles County District Attorney's Office and baseball player
- Martín Satriano (born 2001), Uruguayan footballer
- Tom Satriano (born 1940), American baseball player

== See also ==
- Joe Satriani (born 1956), guitarist
