= Chapman Township =

Chapman Township may refer to:

== Canada ==
- Chapman Township, Ontario, now part of the township of Magnetawan

== United States ==
- Chapman Township, Clay County, Kansas
- Chapman Township, Ottawa County, Kansas, in Ottawa County, Kansas
- Chapman Township, Merrick County, Nebraska
- Chapman Township, Saunders County, Nebraska
- Chapman Township, Clinton County, Pennsylvania
- Chapman Township, Snyder County, Pennsylvania
