= Tom Brown (safety) =

American football and baseball player (1940–2025)

- Born: December 12, 1940; Laureldale, Pennsylvania, U.S.
- Died: April 24, 2025 (aged 84); Palm Harbor, Florida, U.S.
- Education: University of Maryland, College Park
- Football career

No. 40, 21
- Position: Safety

Personal information
- Listed height: 6 ft 1 in (1.85 m)
- Listed weight: 192 lb (87 kg)

Career information
- High school: Montgomery Blair (Silver Spring, Maryland)
- College: Maryland
- NFL draft: 1963: 2nd round, 28th overall pick
- AFL draft: 1963: 3rd round, 20th overall pick

Career history
- Green Bay Packers (1964–1968); Washington Redskins (1969)

Awards and highlights
- 2× Super Bowl champion (I, II); 3× NFL champion (1965, 1966, 1967); First-team All-ACC (1962)

Career NFL statistics
- Interceptions: 13
- Fumble recoveries: 6
- Interception yards: 210
- Kick returns: 7
- Games played: 71
- Stats at Pro Football Reference
- Baseball career
- Outfielder, first baseman
- Batted: Switch Threw: Left

MLB debut
- April 8, 1963, for the Washington Senators

Last MLB appearance
- September 29, 1963, for the Washington Senators

MLB statistics
- Batting average: .147
- Home runs: 1
- Runs batted in: 4
- Stats at Baseball Reference

Teams
- Washington Senators (1963)

Thomas William Brown (December 12, 1940 – April 24, 2025) was an American professional football and baseball player. He won three consecutive National Football League (NFL) championships with the Green Bay Packers. He was the first athlete to both play baseball in the major leagues and appear in a Super Bowl.

Brown played both college football and baseball for the Maryland Terrapins. In 1963, he played baseball professionally for the Washington Senators of the American League, before becoming a defensive back in the NFL for six seasons with the Packers and Washington Redskins.

== Early life and education ==
Brown was born in Laureldale, Pennsylvania, on December 12, 1940. He attended Montgomery Blair High School in Silver Spring, Maryland, a suburb of Washington, D.C. He was an All-Met selection in football and basketball, but not in baseball, which he said "was always my first love".

Brown accepted a football scholarship from the University of Maryland, College Park, on the condition that he was exempt from spring practice, freeing him to play baseball. "Football I just used, I guess, to get an education in college. I never really liked football that much", he said, adding that his parents were not well off. As a junior for the Terrapins, Brown was named a first-team baseball All-American and set an Atlantic Coast Conference (ACC) record with a .449 batting average. In his senior year in 1962, he was an honorable mention All-American in football while recording an ACC-record 11 interceptions.

== Career ==
=== Professional baseball ===
In December 1962, Brown was selected by the Green Bay Packers in the second round of the 1963 NFL draft with the 28th overall pick, and by the Buffalo Bills in the third round of the American Football League draft with the 20th overall selection. He attended the Packers' 1962 NFL Championship Game, visited the locker room, and said, "These guys are big. I'm going to play baseball". A few months later, he signed a minor league contract with the Washington Senators baseball team, forgoing his final season of college baseball eligibility.

Brown played in the outfield and at first base for the Senators in 1963. A switch hitter who threw left-handed, he played extremely well in spring training, batting .312, and earned a spot on the major league team. He began the regular season as the starting first baseman, but after starting the year with no hits in 14 at bats, he was replaced in the lineup with Dick Phillips Brown was sent to the minors on June 29 after batting only .100 with 31 strikeouts in 80 at bats. After batting .228 in 77 Class AA games with the York White Roses in the Eastern League, he was recalled by Washington in September, when he hit his only home run in the majors. After hitting 8-for-32 to close the season, Brown finished the year with the Senators batting .147 in 61 games (23 as a starter), with 17 hits in 116 at bats with one homer, and four runs batted in.

After declining an offer from Green Bay and re-signing with Washington for 1964, Brown batted .161 in spring training and was sent down to York 48 hours before the Senators' opening day. With a .217 average in early July, he decided to quit baseball and sign to play football with Green Bay.

=== Professional football ===
Brown played defensive back for the Packers from 1964 through 1968. He was their starting free safety in 1965, when they won an NFL championship. In the 1966 NFL Championship Game at the Cotton Bowl in Dallas, Brown intercepted a fourth-down pass in the end zone by quarterback Don Meredith in the final minute, preserving the Packers' 34–27 victory over the Cowboys. He was part of the Packers' unprecedented three consecutive NFL titles under head coach Vince Lombardi, which concluded with victories in Super Bowls I and II.

Brown was traded to the Washington Redskins in February 1969 in the first Redskins trade made by Lombardi, who had been appointed Washington's new head coach. Brown played in only one game for the Redskins, their 1969 opener against New Orleans, and then had shoulder surgery. He was waived by the team in late August 1970, He was signed by the Minnesota Vikings but released a month later. His chronic shoulder injury coupled with Lombardi's death that year prompted him to retire from football.

Brown finished his NFL career with 13 interceptions and six fumble recoveries, including one for a touchdown, and also returned 27 punts and 7 kickoffs. His head coach for five seasons was Lombardi, four in Green Bay and one in Washington; the exception was in 1968, after Lombardi stepped down and was succeeded by Phil Bengtson. Brown led the Packers that season with four interceptions.

== Personal life and death ==
Brown received his degree from the University of Maryland, completing his studies between seasons during his professional playing career. From 1989 to 2015, he ran a youth sports league in Salisbury, Maryland, for children ages 5–12 called Tom Brown's Rookie League, which included flag football, baseball and basketball.

Brown died in Palm Harbor, Florida on April 24, 2025, (Note: Many breaking news sources mislabeled his date of death as April 23, 2025.) at the age of 84.
