= Marv Throneberry =

American baseball player (1933–1994)

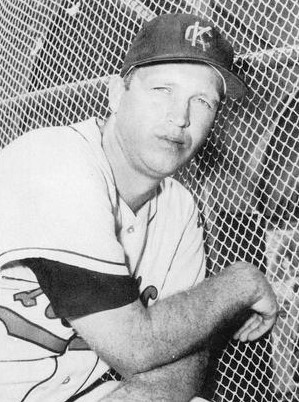
- Throneberry circa 1961
- First baseman
- Born: September 2, 1933; Collierville, Tennessee, U.S.
- Died: June 23, 1994 (aged 60); Fisherville, Tennessee, U.S.
- Batted: Left Threw: Left

MLB debut
- September 25, 1955, for the New York Yankees

Last MLB appearance
- May 5, 1963, for the New York Mets

MLB statistics
- Batting average: .237
- Home runs: 53
- Runs batted in: 170
- Stats at Baseball Reference

Teams
- New York Yankees (1955, 1958–1959); Kansas City Athletics (1960–1961); Baltimore Orioles (1961–1962); New York Mets (1962–1963)

Career highlights and awards
- World Series champion (1958)

Marvin Eugene Throneberry (September 2, 1933 – June 23, 1994) was an American Major League Baseball player. Affectionately known as "Marvelous Marv", he was the starting first baseman for the 1962 New York Mets, a team which set the modern record for most losses in a season with 120, later broken by the Chicago White Sox with 121 in 2024. Throneberry became a well-known figure after appearing in numerous Miller Lite beer commercials in the 1970s and 1980s.

== Early years ==
The left-handed batting and throwing native of Fisherville, Tennessee was a two-time all-city baseball player at South Side High School in Memphis. After turning down an offer to play alongside his older brother, Faye, with the Boston Red Sox, he signed as an amateur free agent with the New York Yankees in May 1952. During his playing days, he was listed as 6 feet 1 inch (1.85 m) tall and 190 pounds (86 kg).

== Minor league slugger ==
Throneberry played the outfield early in his minor league career, and shifted to first base in 1954 with the Kansas City Blues. He was one of the most feared minor league sluggers of the 1950s, and led the Blues with 21 home runs. The following season, he led the Triple-A American Association with 36 home runs and 117 runs batted in as a member of the Denver Bears. That September, he received a call up to the Casey Stengel led New York Yankees. Throneberry made his major league debut as a pinch runner for Eddie Robinson on September 25, 1955 at Fenway Park. He remained in the game at first, and hit a sacrifice fly that scored Andy Carey in his first major league plate appearance. In his first official at bat in the seventh inning, Throneberry hit a bases loaded double that scored two more, and later came around to score himself on a Bob Cerv single. All told, Throneberry went 2-for-2, with a double, run scored and three RBIs. His brother struck out three times for the Red Sox in the same game.

He returned to the Denver Bears in 1956, and once again led the American Association with 42 home runs and 145 RBIs. The following season, he clubbed 40 home runs, and drove in 124, tying an American Association record for leading the league in home runs and RBIs for three consecutive seasons.

== New York Yankees ==
Throneberry made it back to the majors for good in 1958. He collected his first hit of the season, a double off the Baltimore Orioles' Ken Lehman in his tenth at bat. Seeing most of his action as a pinch hitter or late inning defensive replacement at first, an injury to Bill Skowron on May 11 landed Throneberry in the starting line up through the rest of May. He hit his first major league home run off the Chicago White Sox's Bill Fischer on May 20. For the season, Throneberry batted .227 with seven home runs and 19 RBIs in 60 games. He reached the post season for the only time in his career as a rookie, and was struck out by Lew Burdette in his only at bat of the 1958 World Series.

Though he saw more playing time in 1959, he was batting just .184 with three home runs and ten RBIs when Skrowron's season was ended by a fractured wrist. Throneberry responded by batting .286 with five home runs and twelve RBIs the rest of the way. After the season, he was part of the blockbuster trade that sent 1956 World Series hero Don Larsen, Hank Bauer and Norm Siebern to the Kansas City Athletics for power-hitting outfielder Roger Maris, Joe DeMaestri and Kent Hadley.

== Kansas City A's ==
Throneberry began the 1960 season as a pinch-hitter, with Siebern, an outfielder with the Yankees and, like Throneberry, a left-handed hitter, starting at first base through the first five weeks of the campaign. Throneberry made only two starts in the field through May 23 and his batting average was a poor .176 with no extra-base hits. But on May 24 at Municipal Stadium, he was inserted into the lineup at first base (Siebern moved to left field) and Throneberry went three for four, with a homer, double and triple, driving in three runs and leading the Athletics to a 6–2 victory over the Red Sox. Starting assignments in late May and early June yielded three more homers. Finally, on June 21, Athletics manager Bob Elliott moved Siebern to left field on a semi-permanent basis and installed Throneberry at first base. Facing almost exclusively right-handed pitching (he had 28 at bats against southpaws all year), Throneberry batted .250 with eleven home runs and 41 RBIs in 1960, making 55 starts at first base. At home at Kansas City's Municipal Stadium, Throneberry batted .303 with 26 RBIs. On the road, his batting average fell to .205. Midway through the 1961 season, he was traded to the Baltimore Orioles for left fielder Gene Stephens.

== Baltimore Orioles ==
With an All-Star MVP candidate who batted left-handed in Jim Gentile at first base, the Orioles used Throneberry mostly as a pinch hitter or in right field. On June 13, his ninth inning pinch hit single drove in Dick Hall for the walk off victory over the Washington Senators. On June 27, he went 3-for-4 with two home runs and three RBIs against his former teammates in Kansas City to lead the O's to a 5–3 victory. Seventeen games into the 1962 season, the Orioles traded him to the expansion New York Mets for a player to be named later and cash. The Mets sent catcher Hobie Landrith, their first selection in the 1961 Major League Baseball expansion draft, to the Orioles to complete the deal.

== New York Mets ==
Reunited with manager Casey Stengel, Throneberry got his first chance as a regular. On May, in his first game as a Met, Throneberry went 1-for-4, and scored a run in the ninth in an 8–5 loss to the Milwaukee Braves. He would not see home plate again until June 9, when he went 3-for-4 with a run scored and his first RBI as a Met in an 11–6 victory over the Chicago Cubs.

The 1962 Mets may not have won many games, but these "Lovable losers" won the hearts of sports fans, and no one exemplified that more than Throneberry. Many humorous stories surfaced about Throneberry, who facetiously came to be known as "Marvelous Marv." While it is likely that many of these stories are exaggerated or false, they helped turn Throneberry into almost legendary status among Mets fans. The fact of his initials spelling "MET" accentuated all anecdotes. Throneberry maintained a sense of humor about his play and became a favorite with fans and the media (after the season, he received the Ben Epstein Memorial "Good Guy" Award). At one point he had a fan club which numbered around 5,000 members. They wore shirts with the word "VRAM" (Marv backwards) and took up chanting "Cranberry, Strawberry, we love Throneberry."

In one famous story, on June 17, Throneberry hit a triple against the Cubs, but was called out after Ernie Banks took a relay throw and stepped on first base. "Didn't touch the bag, you know, Dusty," Banks told umpire Dusty Boggess. According to the legend, Throneberry was called out at first and Stengel came out to argue the call, but he was told by the umpire "Don't bother arguing, Casey, he missed second base, too." (In another version of the story, Stengel was told this by his first-base coach.) Stengel, after a pause, supposedly replied, "Well, I know he touched third base because he's standing on it!" The next batter, Charlie Neal, hit a home run, prompting Stengel to come out of the dugout following him and pointing at all four bases. Throneberry's mistake proved costly, as the Cubs won the game 8–7.

In the second game of a June 22 doubleheader with fellow expansion club, the Houston Colt .45s, Throneberry committed three of six Mets errors. On August 2, Throneberry had his second career two-home-run game in a 9–4 loss to the Philadelphia Phillies.

His 16 home runs and 49 RBIs in 1962 were both career highs; however, he also committed 17 errors at first base. His fielding percentage of .981 would not be equaled by a major-league regular first baseman until César Cedeño fielded .981 in 1979 for the Houston Astros.

During the off-season, the Mets acquired Tim Harkness from the Los Angeles Dodgers. Harkness assumed the starting first base job, with Throneberry relegated to pinch hitting duty. After going just 2-for-15 through May 5, he was demoted to the Triple-A Buffalo Bisons. While clubbing 16 home runs for Buffalo, he batted just .176. He batted .083 in eight games in 1964 before being released.

== Career statistics ==
Games	PA	AB	Runs	Hits	2B	3B	HR	RBI	SB	BB	SO	HBP	Avg.	Slg.	Fld%
480	1331	1186	143	281	37	8	53	170	3	130	295	1	.237	.416	.987

Throneberry hit 201 minor league home runs with a .269 batting average. With the exception of one rough year defensively, Throneberry was no worse than average with his career fielding percentage and range factor (8.01) as a first baseman.

== Miller Lite commercials ==
"Marvelous Marv" later became one of the original spokesmen for Miller Lite beer in the mid-1970s, poking fun at himself in a series of TV commercials. Throneberry's most famous line: "If I do for Lite what I did for baseball, I'm afraid their sales will go down." In another popular ad, after other celebrities are shown, Throneberry is shown at the end, saying: "I still don't know why they asked me to do this commercial."

Columnist Jimmy Breslin quipped, "Having Marv Throneberry play for your team is like having Willie Sutton work for your bank."

== Personal life ==
Throneberry died of cancer on June 23, 1994 in Fisherville, Tennessee, at age 60. He and his wife, Dixie had five children, ten grandchildren and four great-grandchildren. One of his grandchildren is filmmaker Craig Brewer. In 1983, Throneberry was inducted into the Tennessee Sports Hall of Fame.
