= Bob Martyn =

American baseball player (1930-2015)

- Right fielder
- Born: August 15, 1930; Weiser, Idaho, U.S.
- Died: December 2, 2015 (aged 85); Pacific City, Oregon, U.S.
- Batted: Left Threw: Right

MLB debut
- June 18, 1957, for the Kansas City Athletics

Last MLB appearance
- April 10, 1959, for the Kansas City Athletics

MLB statistics
- Batting average: .263
- Home runs: 3
- Runs batted in: 35
- Stats at Baseball Reference

Teams
- Kansas City Athletics (1957–1959)

Robert Gordon Martyn (August 15, 1930 – December 2, 2015) was an American right fielder in Major League Baseball who played for the Kansas City Athletics in parts of three seasons spanning 1957–1959. Listed at 6' 0", 176 lb., Martyn batted left-handed and threw right-handed. He was born in Weiser, Idaho.

== College career ==
Martyn was an alumnus of Linfield College, where his father Bernard Martyn, aunt Lillian Turner Millsap, uncle Bill Turner and niece Lois Molyneux also attended. Martyn's first year at Linfield was 1948, which he attended not only because much of his family went there, but also because it was affiliated with the Baptist church he went to.

Although Martyn played shortstop at high school in Twin Falls, Idaho, his baseball coach Henry Lever, after noting Martyn's bowlegs, immediately changed his position to outfielder. Martyn once said of the change, "That was probably a major break for my future."

Additionally, Martyn was selected a Northwest Conference All-Star in three consecutive seasons from 1950 to 1952, while helping lead the Linfield Wildcats to conference championship victories in 1950 and 1951.

Academically, Martyn double-majored in mathematics and sociology and he graduated cum laude. While playing professional baseball, he earned his master's degree in education in 1959, studying between seasons.

In 2000, Martyn was elected to the Linfield College Athletics Hall of Fame. His father, Bernard Martyn was elected in 1999. They are one of two father-son combinations in the Linfield College Athletics Hall of Fame.

== Playing career ==
=== Minor leagues ===
Originally signed by the New York Yankees in 1952, Martyn debuted on July 4 of that year and went 5-for-6 for the Class-C Boise Yankees.

In a seven-season career, Martyn hit .298 with 48 home runs and 117 runs batted in in 671 games. He also was named to three All-Star teams while in the minors. In the 1956 American Association All-Star Game, he hit two home runs and earned Most Valuable Player honors.

=== Major leagues ===
On June 15, 1957, the Yankees traded Martyn along Woodie Held, Billy Martin and Ralph Terry to the Athletics in the same transaction that brought Ryne Duren, Jim Pisoni and Harry Simpson to New York.

Just three days after the trade, Martyn made his big league debut facing the Washington Senators. He appeared at right field and went 1–4 with a walk in his first big game.

He finished the season with an average of .267 (35-for-131)

Overall, Martyn hit .267 (35-for-131) with one home run and 12 RBI in 58 game appearances. The following year, he appeared in 95 games and batted .261 (59-for-226) with two homers and 23 RBI, ending sixth in the American League with seven triples and ninth with five intentional walks.

Martyn was used sparingly after that, appearing as a pinch hitter for Bob Grim in 1959. He grounded out and never appeared in a major league game again. On April 12, 1959, he was traded back to the Yankees along with Mike Baxes in exchange for Tom Carroll and Russ Snyder.

In a three-season career, he hit .263 (94-for-358) with three home runs and 35 RBI, including 35 runs scored, 12 doubles, 11 triples and two stolen bases in 154 games.

== Later years ==
After his professional baseball career ended in 1960, Martyn worked for Tektronix for 23 years. He served twice on the Linfield Alumni Board and was president in 1973.

Martyn died in 2015 in Pacific City, Oregon at the age of 85.
