= Satriano =

Satriano may refer to:

- Ascoli Satriano
- Satriano (Calabria)
- Satriano di Lucania
  - its Roman predecessor Satrianum
  - the former Roman Catholic Diocese of Satriano, with see in the above, which is now a Latin Catholic titular see under the Ancient name Satrianum
- Satriano (surname)
