= Fisherville, Tennessee =

- Unincorporated community
- Location within Tennessee Location within the United States
- Coordinates: 35°09′33.321″N 89°39′49.2906″W
- Country: United States
- State: Tennessee
- Counties: Shelby, Fayette
- Elevation: 397 ft (121 m)
- Time zone: UTC-6 (Central (CST))
  - Summer (DST): UTC-5 (CDT)
- Area code: 901
- GNIS feature ID: 1284328

Fisherville is an unincorporated community lying between the jurisdiction of Fayette and Shelby County, Tennessee, United States. Fisherville is located between Eads and Collierville, about 30 miles east of downtown Memphis. The zip code for the area is 38028.

== Annexation ==
Much of Fisherville lies in either the Collierville annexation reserve or the Memphis annexation reserve, meaning that it shall be annexed at some point. Property north of Raleigh-Lagrange Road and south of Herb Parsons Lake has been annexed by the City of Piperton.

== Education ==
Fisherville is serviced by Shelby County Schools.

== Notable people ==
- William A. Feilds, 19th-century African-American ex-slave: Tennessee legislator, teacher and principal
- Faye Throneberry, Major League Baseball player
- Marv Throneberry, Major League Baseball player
