= Faye Throneberry =

American baseball player (1931–1999)

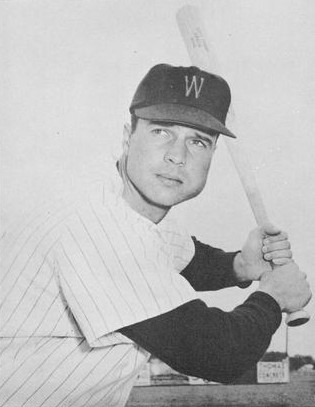
- Throneberry in 1959
- Outfielder
- Born: June 22, 1931; Fisherville, Tennessee, U.S.
- Died: April 26, 1999 (aged 67); Memphis, Tennessee, U.S.
- Batted: Left Threw: Right

MLB debut
- April 15, 1952, for the Boston Red Sox

Last MLB appearance
- July 19, 1961, for the Los Angeles Angels

MLB statistics
- Batting average: .236
- Home runs: 29
- Runs batted in: 137
- Stats at Baseball Reference

Teams
- Boston Red Sox (1952, 1955–1957); Washington Senators (1957–1960); Los Angeles Angels (1961)

Maynard Faye Throneberry (June 22, 1931 – April 26, 1999) was an American professional baseball player. A native of Fisherville, Tennessee, he was a backup outfielder in Major League Baseball who played for the Boston Red Sox (1952, 1955–57), Washington Senators (1957–60) and Los Angeles Angels (1961). Throneberry batted left-handed, threw right-handed, and was listed as 5 feet 11 inches (1.80 m) tall and 185 pounds (84 kg). He was the older brother of Marv Throneberry.

Faye Throneberry's best season probably came in 1959 with the Senators, when he hit a career-high 10 home runs and had 82 hits.

He was claimed on December 14, 1960, by the Angels in the Major League Baseball expansion draft. He played in the franchise's 1961 inaugural season and finished his MLB career with the team.

In an eight-season career, Throneberry posted a .236 batting average (307-for-1,302) with 29 home runs, 137 RBI, 152 runs, 48 doubles, 12 triples, and 23 stolen base in 521 games.

After retiring from baseball, Throneberry became a successful professional trainer of bird dogs. He handled Miller's Miss Knight, a pointer, to victory in the 1973 National Bird Dog Field Trial Championship. He died at age 67 in Memphis, Tennessee.
