= Tom Carroll (infielder) =

American baseball player (1936–2021)

- Shortstop / Third baseman
- Born: September 17, 1936; Jamaica, New York, U.S.
- Died: September 22, 2021 (aged 85)
- Batted: Right Threw: Right

MLB debut
- May 7, 1955, for the New York Yankees

Last MLB appearance
- June 14, 1959, for the Kansas City Athletics

MLB statistics
- Batting average: .300
- Home runs: 0
- RBI: 1
- Stats at Baseball Reference

Teams
- New York Yankees (1955–1956); Kansas City Athletics (1959)

Thomas Edward Carroll (September 17, 1936 – September 22, 2021) was an American right-handed Major League Baseball shortstop, third baseman, and pinch runner, who played from 1955 to 1956 and in 1959 for the New York Yankees and Kansas City Athletics. He was 6 ft 3 in (1.91 m) tall and he weighed 186 pounds (84 kg).

== Baseball career ==
Signed by the Yankees on January 26, 1955, as a bonus baby, Carroll appeared in his first big league game on May 7 of that year. He appeared in a total of 14 games in 1955, collecting two hits in six at-bats for a .333 average. In the World Series that season, he appeared in two games as a pinch-runner but did not get to bat. Carroll was the ninth youngest player in the league that season, and remains the youngest Yankee and second-youngest player ever to appear in a World Series.

In 1956, Carroll was the 10th youngest player in the league at 19 years old. He appeared in 36 games that year, collecting six hits in 17 at-bats for a .353 average. For the Yankees' World Series victory over the Brooklyn Dodgers, and Don Larsen's only perfect game in World Series history that year, Carroll was on the roster and in the dugout but did not play. He then spent the next couple of seasons in the minors.

On April 12, 1959, he was traded to the Athletics with Russ Snyder for Mike Baxes and Bob Martyn. He would appear in 14 games that season, hitting only .143 in seven at-bats. He played his final major league game on June 14.

Overall, Carroll appeared in 64 games. In 30 at-bats, he hit .300 with 15 runs and one RBI. He had a career fielding percentage of .905. His career statistics with the Yankees include 50 game appearances, with a .348 batting average in just 23 at bats.

== Central Intelligence Agency ==
He graduated magna cum laude from the University of Notre Dame in 1961, a year after retiring from baseball. He then joined the Central Intelligence Agency (CIA) as an operations officer, eventually earning Chief of Station duties, Senior Intelligence Service rank, and the Intelligence Medal of Merit. Carroll served the CIA for 26 years, including overseas postings at embassies in Brazil, Chile, Venezuela and London, England. He subsequently worked as a consultant into the early 2000s.

== Personal life ==
Carroll died on September 22, 2021, at the age of 85.
