= Weston, Nebraska =

Village in Saunder County, Nebraska, United States

- Village
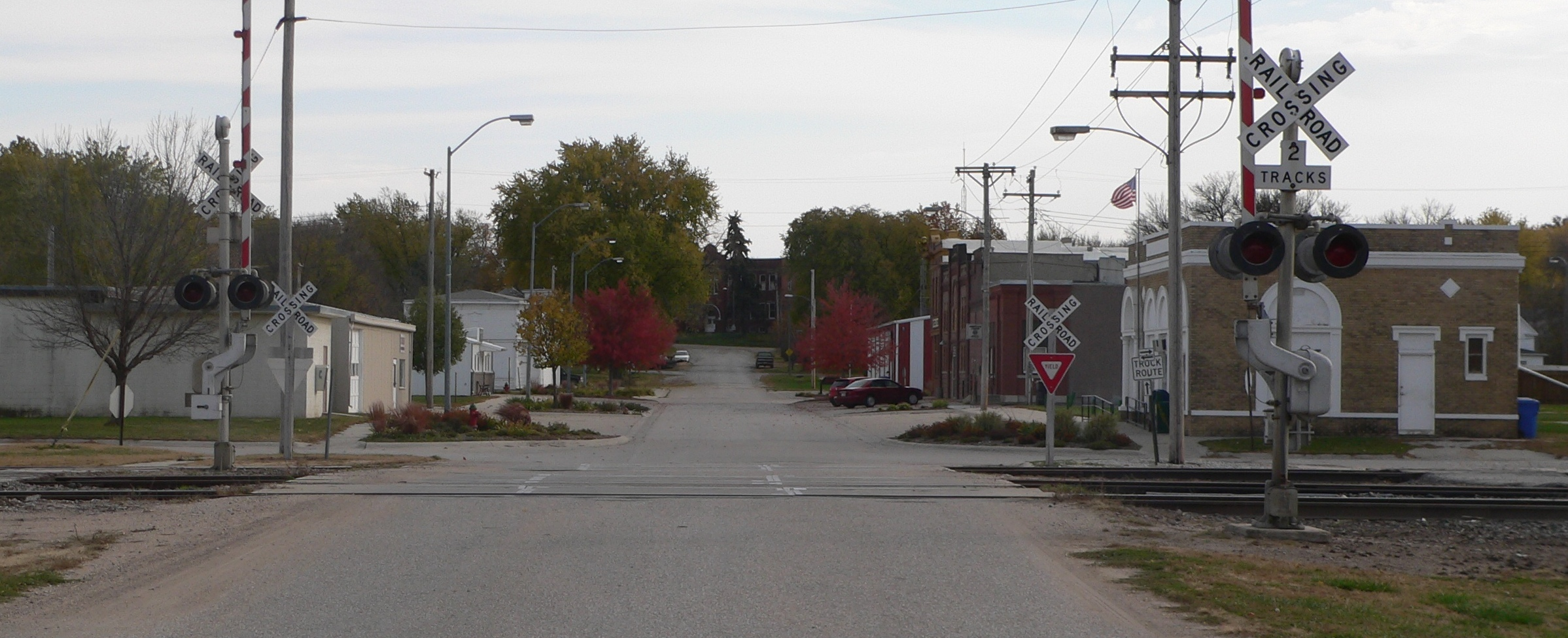
- Downtown Weston, October 2011

- Location of Weston, Nebraska

- Location within Nebraska Location within the United States
- Coordinates: 41°11′35″N 96°44′31″W
- Country: United States
- State: Nebraska
- County: Saunders
- Township: Chapman

Area
  - Total: 0.22 sq mi (0.58 km^{2})
  - Land: 0.22 sq mi (0.58 km^{2})
  - Water: 0 sq mi (0.00 km^{2})
- Elevation: 1,250 ft (380 m)

Population (2020)
  - Total: 250
  - Density: 1,120.6/sq mi (432.68/km^{2})
- Time zone: UTC-6 (Central (CST))
  - Summer (DST): UTC-5 (CDT)
- ZIP code: 68070
- Area code: 402
- FIPS code: 31-52540
- GNIS feature ID: 2400155
- Website: www.weston.ne.us

Weston is a village in Saunders County, Nebraska, United States. The population was 250 at the 2020 census.

== History ==
Weston was platted in 1877 when the Omaha & Republican Valley Railroad was extended to that point.

== Geography ==
According to the United States Census Bureau, the village has a total area of 0.22 square miles (0.57 km^{2}), all land.

== Demographics ==
Historical population
Census	Pop.	Note	%±
1880	53		—
1890	341		543.4%
1900	426		24.9%
1910	432		1.4%
1920	372		−13.9%
1930	365		−1.9%
1940	371		1.6%
1950	345		−7.0%
1960	340		−1.4%
1970	285		−16.2%
1980	286		0.4%
1990	299		4.5%
2000	310		3.7%
2010	324		4.5%
2020	250		−22.8%
U.S. Decennial Census

=== 2010 census ===
As of the census of 2010, there were 324 people, 132 households, and 89 families living in the village. The population density was 1,472.7 inhabitants per square mile (568.6/km^{2}). There were 152 housing units at an average density of 690.9 per square mile (266.8/km^{2}). The racial makeup of the village was 96.0% White, 2.8% from other races, and 1.2% from two or more races. Hispanic or Latino of any race were 5.6% of the population.

There were 132 households, of which 30.3% had children under the age of 18 living with them, 52.3% were married couples living together, 9.1% had a female householder with no husband present, 6.1% had a male householder with no wife present, and 32.6% were non-families. 25.8% of all households were made up of individuals, and 17.4% had someone living alone who was 65 years of age or older. The average household size was 2.45 and the average family size was 2.99.

The median age in the village was 41.5 years. 26.5% of residents were under the age of 18; 6.7% were between the ages of 18 and 24; 20% were from 25 to 44; 29.3% were from 45 to 64; and 17.3% were 65 years of age or older. The gender makeup of the village was 52.8% male and 47.2% female.

=== 2000 census ===
As of the census of 2000, there were 310 people, 132 households, and 81 families living in the village. The population density was 1,006.1 inhabitants per square mile (388.5/km^{2}). There were 138 housing units at an average density of 447.9 per square mile (172.9/km^{2}). The racial makeup of the village was 100.00% White. Hispanic or Latino of any race were 0.32% of the population.

There were 132 households, out of which 26.5% had children under the age of 18 living with them, 49.2% were married couples living together, 6.8% had a female householder with no husband present, and 38.6% were non-families. 33.3% of all households were made up of individuals, and 20.5% had someone living alone who was 65 years of age or older. The average household size was 2.33 and the average family size was 2.99.

In the village, the population was spread out, with 26.1% under the age of 18, 6.1% from 18 to 24, 27.1% from 25 to 44, 21.0% from 45 to 64, and 19.7% who were 65 years of age or older. The median age was 40 years. For every 100 females, there were 93.8 males. For every 100 females age 18 and over, there were 95.7 males.

As of 2000 the median income for a household in the village was $38,750, and the median income for a family was $44,583. Males had a median income of $32,500 versus $19,531 for females. The per capita income for the village was $17,076. About 5.1% of families and 8.8% of the population were below the poverty line, including 10.0% of those under age 18 and 11.1% of those age 65 or over.

== Notable people ==
- Bob Cerv, baseball player
- Zach Miller, professional football player for the Chicago Bears

== See also ==
- List of municipalities in Nebraska
