= Ryne Duren =

American baseball player (1929–2011)

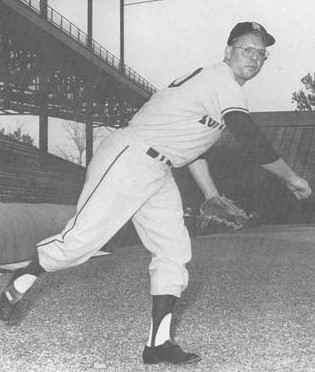
- Pitcher
- Born: February 22, 1929; Cazenovia, Wisconsin, U.S.
- Died: January 6, 2011 (aged 81); Lake Wales, Florida, U.S.
- Batted: Right Threw: Right

MLB debut
- September 25, 1954, for the Baltimore Orioles

Last MLB appearance
- August 18, 1965, for the Washington Senators

MLB statistics
- Win–loss record: 27–44
- Earned run average: 3.83
- Strikeouts: 630
- Saves: 57
- Stats at Baseball Reference

Teams
- Baltimore Orioles (1954); Kansas City Athletics (1957); New York Yankees (1958–1961); Los Angeles Angels (1961–1962); Philadelphia Phillies (1963–1964); Cincinnati Reds (1964); Philadelphia Phillies (1965); Washington Senators (1965)

Career highlights and awards
- 4× All-Star (1958, 1959, 1959², 1961); World Series champion (1958)

Rinold George "Ryne" Duren (February 22, 1929 – January 6, 2011) was an American professional baseball relief pitcher who played ten seasons in Major League Baseball (MLB).

He was known for the combination of his blazing fastball and his very poor vision. With his thick eyeglasses, few batters dared to dig in against Duren. Casey Stengel said, "I would not admire hitting against Ryne Duren, because if he ever hit you in the head you might be in the past tense."

== Early life ==
Duren was born on February 22, 1929, in Cazenovia, Wisconsin. In 1945, he suffered an attack of rheumatic fever, which left him wearing thick eyeglasses for the rest of his life to compensate for his poor vision. He attended Cazenovia High School, but pitched only briefly for the school baseball team, as he injured a batter with one of his fastballs, and could not control his pitch location. He was moved to second base and would throw underhanded to the first baseman. He later pitched for the Cazenovia team in the amateur Sauk County League, averaging over 20 strikeouts per game; and once pitching 33 consecutive no-hit innings.

== Career ==
Duren was originally signed by the St. Louis Browns (later becoming the Baltimore Orioles in 1954) as a free agent before the 1949 season.

=== Minor leagues ===
Other than playing one game for the Orioles in 1954, Duren played in the minor leagues from 1949 to 1957, before becoming a major league pitcher in the 1957 season. He pitched in 36 games for the Class-D Wausau Lumberjacks in 1949, going 85 innings. He had 145 strikeouts, averaging 15.4 strikeouts per nine innings; but also had 114 bases on balls, averaging 12.1 walks per nine innings. He hit over ten batters and had 18 wild pitches.

In 1950, he was promoted to the Class-C Pine Bluff Judges, where he had a 15–7 won–loss record, with a 3.17 earned run average (ERA). He had 157 bases on balls and 233 strikeouts in 190 innings pitched. The following year, he played Single-A baseball for the Dayton Indians, with a 17–8 record and 2.73 ERA. In 198 innings pitched, Duren had 238 strikeouts,194 bases on balls, 13 hit batsmen and 11 wild pitches. He played for the Double-A San Antonio Missions of the Texas League in 1953-54 and part of 1955, averaging at least 9.2 strikeouts per nine innings each year, and reducing his bases on balls per nine innings each year (7.1, 5.9, 5.4 respectively); though his ERA went up each year (2.63, 3.44, 3.98 respectively). Once, while pitching for San Antonio, he was so hungover that he threw a pitch that hit a player in the on-deck circle.

While the Texas League had started including a few black players in the 1950s, there was still considerable racial segregation and animosity. The Shreveport Sports manager had his pitchers throw at black players in the league, including Willie Tasby, a black player on the Missions. Duren would not tolerate this and so threw at the Shreveport batters in response. The fear of being hit by Duren ended pitches being thrown at Tasby.

He also pitched seven games in the Pacific Coast League (PCL) for the Seattle Rainiers in 1955, going 2–3 with a 3.71 ERA, and 38 strikeouts and 22 walks in 34 innings pitched. In 1956, he played for the Orioles' PCL affiliate, the Vancouver Mounties, with an 11–11 record and 4.13 ERA. His strikeouts per nine innings remained high (8.0), but his bases on ball per nine innings were a career low (3.8) at that point. Baltimore manager Paul Richards was unimpressed by Duren in 1955, after suffering elbow inflammation, and kept him in minor league baseball.

=== Major leagues ===
==== Kansas City Athletics ====
His only game with the Browns/Orioles major league franchise came on September 25, 1954, by which time the Browns had become the Baltimore Orioles. On September 21, 1956, he was traded to the Kansas City Athletics with Jim Pisoni in exchange for Al Pilarcik and Art Ceccarelli. In 1957, Duren pitched in 14 games for the A's, starting six. He was 0–3 with a 5.27 ERA, with 37 strikeouts and 30 walks in 42.2 innings pitched, when the A's traded him.

==== New York Yankees ====
The Athletics and New York Yankees were frequent trading partners in the late 1950s, after a business friend of Yankees' owner Dan Topping bought the A's from Connie Mack's family in 1954. On June 15, 1957, Duren, Pisoni, and Harry Simpson were sent to the Yankees for Billy Martin, Ralph Terry, Woodie Held, and Bob Martyn. He did not play for the Yankees in 1957, and was assigned to the team's Triple-A affiliate, the Denver Bears. Under Denver manager Ralph Houk, he learned how to be a better pitcher. Duren had a 13–2 record, 3.16 ERA, and struck out 116 batters in 114 innings. He only walked 33 batters (2.6 per nine innings, the lowest average of his career) and had only three hit batsmen and two wild pitches. He pitched a no-hitter for Denver as well.

Duren was called up to play for the Yankees in 1958, in what was deemed by the American League (AL) to be his rookie year. Duren kept his A's uniform number of 26 with the Yankees. He pitched in 44 games, only one as a starter. He had a 6–4 record, 2.02 ERA, 19 saves, and 87 strikeouts in 75.2 innings (10.3 per nine innings), with 43 walks (5.1 per nine innings). While saves did not become an official statistic until 1969, he was unofficially tied for the league lead in saves with Dick Hyde. It has also been reported that he had 20 saves that year. He was selected to the AL All-Star team, even though a relief pitcher. He came in second to Albie Pearson in AL rookie-of-the-year voting, and 22nd in AL most valuable player voting.

Duren pitched in three games of the 1958 World Series, the Yankees defeating the Milwaukee Braves four games to three. He had one win, one loss and one save, with a 1.93 ERA, 14 strikeouts and six walks in 9.1 innings pitched. He was the losing pitcher in Game 1, pitching 2.2 innings and giving up one run in the bottom of the 10th inning in the 4–3 loss. Braves Hall of fame pitcher Warren Spahn pitched all ten innings for the Braves. He pitched two innings to gain a save for Don Larsen for a combined shutout in Game 3. He was the winning pitcher in Game 6, in relief of Whitey Ford and Art Ditmar, striking out eight Braves in 4.2 innings, in another ten inning game.

Although Duren won Game 6, he was fined $250 by Commissioner Ford Frick. In the bottom of the tenth inning, Duren pitched to the Braves' Johnny Logan with a full count. Umpire Charlie Bell called ball four, giving Logan first base. Duren was infuriated and made a "choke up" signal toward Bell. Subsequent to the game, the other umpires urged Bell to report the incident (which he did not actually see), and Commissioner Frick fined Duren for the disparaging gesture. Duren said he did not remember making the sign, but sincerely apologized to Bell.

In 1959, his won–loss record was much poorer (3–6), but his 1.88 ERA was the best of his career, and he had 14 saves in 41 relief appearances. He had 96 strikeouts in 76.2 innings pitched (11.3 per nine innings), while walking 43. Duren was selected to both 1959 All-star games. He pitched three innings in the July 7 game, striking out four batters, including Hall of Famers Willie Mays and Eddie Mathews. He did not pitch in the August 3 game. Toward the end of the 1959 season, Duren suffered a broken wrist while trying to dodge a young fan. Earlier in the year he'd had knee issues.

Even though the Yankees went to the World Series again in 1960, famously losing to the Pittsburgh Pirates in seven games, Duren's pitching fell off dramatically. His injuries had not resolved going into the 1960 season, and he wound up with a 3–4 record and 4.96 ERA (over three runs a game worse than the previous year). He averaged a career-best 12.3 strikeouts per nine innings, and held opposing hitters to a .160 batting average; but also averaged a career-worst nine bases on balls per nine innings. He did pitch four innings in the World Series, giving up only one run.

Duren got his arm strength back in 1961, but by then alcoholism was undermining his career. He had begun drinking in his teenage years, and the problem grew over time. On a Yankees trip in 1958, he got in a fight with his old Denver manager Ralph Houk, by then a Yankees coach, leaving a cut over Duren's eye. Yankees general manager George Weiss had private detectives follow Duren because of his drinking. Duren stayed with the Yankees until May 8, 1961, when he was traded to the Los Angeles Angels with Johnny James and Lee Thomas in exchange for Tex Clevenger and Bob Cerv. Duren himself admitted that his increased drinking and body's deterioration was the reason the Yankees traded him.

==== Los Angeles Angels, Philadelphia Phillies, Cincinnati Reds and Washington Senators ====
1961 was the Angels first year as a team in the American League. Duren pitched in 40 games for the Angels, including 14 as a starter (with one shutout). He had a 6–12 record and 5.18 ERA. He did average nearly 10 strikeouts a game, but also seven walks a game. From 1958-60 with the Yankees, he had started only two games. Shortly after being traded to the Angels, on June 9, 1961, he struck out seven successive Red Sox batters, then an American League record. He pitched 6.2 innings as a starter in that game, with 11 strikeouts in total.

Despite this poor overall record, he was selected for the first 1961 All-star game, although he did not play. In 1962, he appeared in 42 games for the Angels, but started only three, finishing with a 2–9 record to go with a 4.42 ERA. On New Year's eve in 1962, while living in San Antonio, a drunken Duren parked on railroad tracks, daring a train conductor to hit him. He was arrested for disorderly conduct.

The Angels sold his contract rights to the Philadelphia Phillies before the 1963 season. Duren improved with a 3.30 ERA and 6–2 record in 33 games (seven as a starter). The Phillies sold his rights to the Cincinnati Reds in May of 1964, where his ERA fell to 2.89 as he averaged only 3.1 bases on balls per nine innings, although he pitched less than 44 innings. Released by Cincinnati in April 1965, he was signed by the Phillies; after being released two months later, he joined the Washington Senators, but was released again on August 24 to bring a close to his 10-year Major League career.

A week before being released by the Senators, he had done poorly in a game because of a hangover. After the game, while drunk, he had left his car on the way home to climb a bridge and commit suicide because he could no longer bear his subjugation to alcohol and the end of his career. The police had to call Senators' manager Gil Hodges to talk Duren off of the bridge. Hodges told him “'Ryne ... you're drunk. come on down. We'll get you help. You're too good to do this to yourself.'”

==== Reputation as a pitcher ====
Duren was known for his pitching velocity, strikeouts and lack of control, as well as his showmanship. In his ten-year career, he averaged 9.6 strikeouts per nine innings and six walks per nine innings. Duren only pitched 589.1 innings in the major leagues, but his strikeout average would rank in the top-20 all time, if compared to pitchers with at least 1,000 innings pitched (as of 2024). On the other end, he would not even rank in the top 1,000 best pitchers in giving up the fewest walks per nine innings.

Duren is reported to have had a 100-mile-per-hour (160 km/h) fastball, and said Hall of famer Mickey Mantle told Duren that Duren was the fastest pitcher Mantle ever witnessed. Ralph Houk said Hall of fame pitcher Bob Feller was the only other pitcher who threw as hard as Duren. The combination of his poor vision/thick glasses, erratic control and pitching velocity made batters fear being hit by one of his pitches. He was also known to enhance this fear by intentionally pitching wildly during his warmups.

"Big guy. Throws like hell. Hitter can't see it. But he can't see you either. He's practically blind. Can't hit, field or run. Curve not much. Neither is sinker. Just throws fast one. Unpredictable where it'll go. – minor league scouting report

Duren was a showman. In those days, the Yankee bullpen was a part of the short-porch right field and only a low chain link fence served as the boundary. When called upon by Casey Stengel to relieve, he would not use the gate, but preferred to hop the fence with one hand and begin a slow walk to the mound with his blue Yankee warm-up jacket covering his pitching arm; he followed this routine even on the hottest days. When he finally took the ball and began his warmups, the first pitch was sometimes a hard fastball 20 feet over the catcher's head. The succeeding warmup pitches would be thrown lower and lower (but not slower) until Duren would finally "find" the plate. He was so wild that he allegedly hit a player in the on-deck circle.

== Legacy ==
After being released by the Senators, Duren spent 82 days in a hospital in Texas because of his mental health. Because of his drinking, he could not keep a job, lost his family, and was in and out of various rehabilitation centers. This changed on May 2, 1968, when he went in for treatment at the DePaul Rehabilitation Hospital in Milwaukee (the date of his last drink). This finally enabled him to control his alcoholism, and he began to study and learn how to work with others. Duren's life work became helping others control their alcoholism, which he came to see as a disease in need of treatment. He initially worked in a rehabilitation clinic in Stoughton, Wisconsin, outside of Madison. He co-founded SHARE (Stoughton Hospital Alcohol Rehabilitation Education).

In 1983, Duren was presented with the Yankee Family Award for his conquering alcoholism, and for service as an alcohol abuse educator. He wrote two books about his alcoholism journey, served as a public speaker and established programs on controlling alcoholism. In 1978, with Robert Drury, he co-authored a memoir, The Comeback. In 2003, Duren and author Tom Sabellico wrote the book, I Can See Clearly Now. Duren talks from the heart about life, baseball and alcohol. The foreword was written by Jim "Mudcat" Grant. Duren helped numerous baseball players with their addiction issues.

Duren is the uncle of singer Blackie Lawless from the heavy metal band W.A.S.P.

Baseball Hall of Famer Ryne Sandberg was named in honor of Duren.

Duren’s name was included on the Walls of Honor at Miller Park in Milwaukee.

Duren was the inspiration for the character Ricky "Wild Thing" Vaughn in the movie Major League, according to its author and director David S. Ward.

== Death ==
Duren died on January 6, 2011.

== See also ==
- List of Major League Baseball annual saves leaders
- List of Major League Baseball single-inning strikeout leaders
