= Bob Sprout =

American baseball player (born 1941)

- Pitcher
- Born: December 5, 1941 (age 84); Florin, Pennsylvania, U.S.
- Batted: Left Threw: Left

MLB debut
- September 27, 1961, for the Los Angeles Angels

Last MLB appearance
- September 27, 1961, for the Los Angeles Angels

MLB statistics
- Win–loss record: 0–0
- Earned run average: 4.50
- Strikeouts: 2
- Innings pitched: 4
- Stats at Baseball Reference

Teams
- Los Angeles Angels (1961)

Robert Samuel Sprout (born December 5, 1941) is an American former professional baseball player who appeared in one Major League game for 1961 Los Angeles Angels. A left-handed pitcher, he stood 6 feet (1.8 m) tall and weighed 165 pounds (75 kg).

== Biography ==
Sprout was acquired by the Angels from the Detroit Tigers with the ninth selection in the 1960 Major League Baseball expansion draft. During the 1960 minor league season, Sprout won 15 of 22 decisions as a member of the Decatur Commodores of the Class D Midwest League. The eighteen-year-old, in his first year of professional ball, led his league in strikeouts (264) in 190 innings pitched, compiled a low earned run average (2.61) and was elected the league's Rookie of the Year and a member of the all-star team.

On August 18, 1960, he set (and still holds) the Midwest League's single-game strikeout record, when he struck out 22 batters against the Waterloo Hawks. The Commodores won by a score of 3–0.

Sprout spent most of 1961 with the Angels' Triple-A farm team, the Dallas-Fort Worth Rangers, and was recalled in September when the rosters expanded.

He made his only MLB appearance on September 27 as a starting pitcher against the American League's other expansion team, the Washington Senators, at Wrigley Field. In four full innings pitched, he allowed four hits, three runs (two earned) and three bases on balls; he struck out two. He exited the game for a pinch hitter (Ed Sadowski) with the Angels leading, 4–3. (They eventually won, 8–6.)

Sprout returned to the minor leagues in 1962 and retired from organized baseball after the 1965 season.
