= Bob Baird =

American baseball player (1940–1974)

- Pitcher
- Born: January 16, 1940; Knoxville, Tennessee, US
- Died: April 11, 1974 (aged 34); Chattanooga, Tennessee, US
- Batted: Left Threw: Left

MLB debut
- September 3, 1962, for the Washington Senators

Last MLB appearance
- September 27, 1963, for the Washington Senators

MLB statistics
- Win–loss record: 0–4
- Earned run average: 7.25
- Strikeouts: 10
- Stats at Baseball Reference

Teams
- Washington Senators (1962–1963)

Robert Allen Baird (January 16, 1940 – April 11, 1974) was an American professional baseball player, a left-handed pitcher who appeared in eight total games in Major League Baseball over parts of two seasons with the Washington Senators (1962–1963).

== Biography ==
Born in Knoxville, Tennessee, Baird stood 6 feet 4 inches (1.93 m) tall and weighed 195 pounds (88 kg). He attended Carson Newman College.

Baird had a six-year (1962–1967) professional career. The Senators, then a two-year-old expansion team, brought Baird up for an audition during the September of his first year in pro ball, 1962, and gave him three starts. Then, the following September, they called him up again and used him in five games, three as a starter. But Baird went winless in four decisions. In 221/3 MLB innings pitched, he allowed 25 hits, 15 bases on balls, and 18 earned runs. He fanned ten. Baird appeared in 148 games in minor league baseball, where he fashioned a 47–46 record and a 3.99 earned run average.

After baseball, Baird was a traveling salesman for a Cincinnati-based company. Baird died in Chattanooga, Tennessee, at age 34, nine days after he was shot by a woman who was charged with his murder.
