= Bill Dailey =

American baseball player (1935–2025)

- Pitcher
- Born: May 13, 1935; Arlington, Virginia, U.S.
- Died: January 11, 2025 (aged 89); Bedford, Virginia, U.S.
- Batted: Right Threw: Right

MLB debut
- August 17, 1961, for the Cleveland Indians

Last MLB appearance
- June 9, 1964, for the Minnesota Twins

MLB statistics
- Win–loss record: 10–7
- Earned run average: 2.76
- Strikeouts: 109
- Saves: 22
- Stats at Baseball Reference

Teams
- Cleveland Indians (1961–1962); Minnesota Twins (1963–1964)

William Garland Dailey (May 13, 1935 – January 11, 2025) was an American Major League Baseball relief pitcher who played in all or part of four seasons for the Cleveland Indians from 1961 to 1962 and the Minnesota Twins from 1963 to 1964. The right-hander stood 6 feet 3 inches (1.91 m) tall and weighed 185 pounds (84 kg). He was born in Arlington, Virginia.

Dailey spent almost nine full years in minor league baseball before his recall by the Indians in August 1961. In Dailey's one full Major League season—1963 with the Twins—he appeared in 66 games (second among American League pitchers), compiling a 6–3 record and a 1.99 earned run average. His 21 saves ranked third in the league that season. But he sustained a rotator cuff injury in 1964, and he retired from baseball after the season.

In 119 career MLB games pitched, all in relief, Dailey posted a 10–7 won–lost record, 22 saves, and a 2.76 earned run average. In 1852/3 innings pitched, he struck out 109, allowing 162 hits and 59 bases on balls.

Dailey died in Bedford, Virginia on January 11, 2025, at the age of 89.
