= Russ Heman =

American baseball player (born 1933)

- Pitcher
- Born: February 10, 1933 (age 92); Olive, California, U.S.
- Batted: Right Threw: Right

MLB debut
- April 20, 1961, for the Cleveland Indians

Last MLB appearance
- June 18, 1961, for the Los Angeles Angels

MLB statistics
- Win–loss record: 0–0
- Earned run average: 2.70
- Strikeouts: 6
- Stats at Baseball Reference

Teams
- Cleveland Indians (1961); Los Angeles Angels (1961)

Russell Frederick Heman (born February 10, 1933) is an American former Major League Baseball relief pitcher.

The 6 ft 4 in (1.93 m), 200 lb (91 kg) right-hander was signed by the Chicago White Sox as an amateur free agent before the 1952 season. He went 34-34 with a 4.07 earned run average in four seasons in their farm system when he was dealt to the Baltimore Orioles on January 31, 1958. The White Sox had sent Larry Doby, Jack Harshman and Jim Marshall to the Orioles for Billy Goodman, Tito Francona and Ray Moore on December 3, 1957. When it was discovered by the Orioles that Harshman was suffering from a slipped disc, Baseball Commissioner Ford Frick ordered the Chisox to send either $20,000 or an acceptable player to the Orioles. Heman was sent to Baltimore to complete this deal.

Heman went 9-12 with a 3.20 ERA for Baltimore's triple A affiliate, the Vancouver Mounties in 1958. After the season, he was dealt to the Cleveland Indians for Bobby Ávila. This trade also ran into some complications when Avila retired from baseball just after the deal. Eventually, the deal was worked out, and Heman went 6-12 with a 4.26 ERA for the Pacific Coast League's San Diego Padres in 1959. One of those six wins was a no-hitter against the Mounties.

After one more seasons in the minors, he made the big league club out of Spring training 1961. His major league debut came in the sixth game of the season on April 20, against the Detroit Tigers at Cleveland Stadium. He pitched two innings, and gave up three earned runs in the 11-4 Indians loss. He struck out one batter, pitcher Frank Lary.

From there, he settled down, earning his only big league save in his next appearance three days later against the Kansas City Athletics at Municipal Stadium. He only allowed one earned run over the remaining eight innings he pitched for the Tribe.

He was sold to the Los Angeles Angels on June 5 in order to make room on the roster for Dick Stigman, who was returning from the disabled list. He made six appearances in just over two weeks with the club, giving up three runs (two earned) in ten innings pitched. On June 22, he and shortstop Ken Hamlin were sent to the Toronto Maple Leafs of the International League for second baseman Billy Moran.

Heman finished out the season with Toronto, and pitched two more seasons in the minors before calling it a career. Season and career totals include twelve games pitched, all in relief, a 0-0 record and one save. In twenty innings, he allowed twelve hits and 10 walks for a very low WHIP of 1.100. He struck out six and had an ERA of 2.70.
