= Tom Satriano =

American baseball player (born 1940)

- Catcher / Utility infielder
- Born: August 28, 1940 (age 85); Pittsburgh, Pennsylvania, U.S.
- Batted: Left Threw: Right

MLB debut
- July 23, 1961, for the Los Angeles Angels

Last MLB appearance
- September 19, 1970, for the Boston Red Sox

MLB statistics
- Batting average: .225
- Home runs: 21
- Runs batted in: 157
- Stats at Baseball Reference

Teams
- Los Angeles/California Angels (1961–1969); Boston Red Sox (1969–1970)

Thomas Victor Nicholas Satriano (born August 28, 1940) is an American former professional baseball player. Although he began his professional career as a third baseman, he converted to catcher and played 321 games as a backstop during a ten-year, 674-game Major League Baseball career from 1961–1970 for the Los Angeles / California Angels and Boston Red Sox. He batted left-handed, threw right-handed, and was listed as 6 feet 1 inch (1.85 m) tall and 185 pounds (84 kg).

== Biography ==
Born in Pittsburgh, Satriano graduated from Loyola High School in Los Angeles and attended the University of Southern California, where he was a member of the Trojans' 1961 NCAA tournament championship team. He signed with the Angels in July 1961 and was immediately placed on the team's Major League roster during its first season as an American League expansion team. He appeared in 35 games played as an infielder, and started 21 games at third base. His conversion to catcher began in 1963, and by 1966 he was predominantly a receiver. All told, Satriano collected 365 hits during his MLB career, including 53 doubles.

Satriano's daughter Gina played for the Colorado Silver Bullets, a women's baseball team. She is currently an Assistant District Attorney in Los Angeles.
