= Fritz Brickell =

American baseball player (1935–1965)

- Shortstop
- Born: March 19, 1935; Wichita, Kansas, U.S.
- Died: October 15, 1965 (aged 30); Wichita, Kansas, U.S.
- Batted: Right Threw: Right

MLB debut
- April 30, 1958, for the New York Yankees

Last MLB appearance
- May 15, 1961, for the Los Angeles Angels

MLB statistics
- Batting average: .182
- Home runs: 1
- Runs batted in: 7
- Stats at Baseball Reference

Teams
- New York Yankees (1958–1959); Los Angeles Angels (1961)

Fritz Darrell Brickell (March 19, 1935 – October 15, 1965) was an American professional baseball player who played in parts of three seasons for the New York Yankees (1958–1959) and Los Angeles Angels (1961) of Major League Baseball. He was the son of former Major League outfielder Fred Brickell.

Brickell was born and raised in Wichita, Kansas. He attended East High School in Wichita, where he appears in its yearbook on both the football and basketball teams, but not on the baseball team, then graduated in 1953. Tom Greenwade, the local scout for the Yankees, signed Brickell in 1953.

An infielder, Brickell stood 5 feet 5 inches (1.65 m) tall and weighed 157 pounds (71 kg); he batted and threw right-handed. His eight years in the Yankee farm system (1953–1960) were interrupted by two trials with the Bombers. After a two-game stint as a defensive replacement at the start of the 1958 season, Brickell received a more extended audition with the Yanks in the middle of 1959, getting into 18 games, including nine starts at shortstop, in June and July. His ten hits included his only MLB home run, a two-run shot off former Yankee Tom Morgan, then with the Detroit Tigers.

After spending 1960 in Triple-A, Brickell was traded to the expansion Angels on the eve of the 1961 season. He was the first starting shortstop in Angels' franchise history: on April 11, 1961, at Memorial Stadium, he went one-for-four at bat and handled nine chances in the field, turning a double play but committing two errors, as the Angels shocked the Baltimore Orioles, 7–2.

But Brickell struggled on both offense and defense, batting only .122 in 49 at bats and making seven errors in 71 total chances (for a .901 fielding percentage). He started his last game on May 8, and spent most of 1961 with the Toronto Maple Leafs of the International League. All told, In 41 MLB games, Brickell collected 16 hits, including two for extra bases. He played in the minors through 1962.

Brickell retired to Wichita, Kansas, where he was working in the sporting goods industry. In 1964, he played for a local semi-pro baseball team before being diagnosed with cancer. On August 29, 1965, "Fritz Brickell Night" was held in Wichita to help raise money for Brickell's medical expenses. Dick Sanders, who managed the semi-pro team, had Mickey Mantle flown in to help raise money for the cause at Lawrence Stadium.

Brickell died on October 15, 1965 in Wichita.

== See also ==
- List of second-generation Major League Baseball players
