= Wynn Hawkins =

American baseball player (1936–2021)

- Pitcher
- Born: February 20, 1936; East Palestine, Ohio, U.S.
- Died: February 11, 2021 (aged 84); Canfield, Ohio, U.S.
- Batted: Right Threw: Right

MLB debut
- April 22, 1960, for the Cleveland Indians

Last MLB appearance
- June 9, 1962, for the Cleveland Indians

MLB statistics
- Win–loss record: 12–13
- Earned run average: 4.17
- Strikeouts: 90
- Stats at Baseball Reference

Teams
- Cleveland Indians (1960–1962)

Wynn Firth Hawkins (February 20, 1936 – February 11, 2021) was an American professional baseball player, scout and executive. During his active career, he was a right-handed pitcher who was signed by the Cleveland Indians before the 1955 season, and played in the Major Leagues with the Indians from 1960 to 1962. He attended Baldwin Wallace University, where he was a star in basketball. Hawkins stood 6 feet 3 inches (1.91 m) tall and weighed 195 pounds (88 kg).

Hawkins was perhaps best known for giving up Ted Williams's 500th home run (June 17, 1960). He appeared in 48 games (with 30 starts) during his three seasons with the Tribe. During his career, Hawkins gave up 99 walks in just 2022/3 innings pitched, for a BB/9IP of 4.40, higher than the American League average at that time. He finished his career with a total of 12 wins, 13 losses, 1 save, 11 games finished, and an ERA of 4.17.

Career highlights for Hawkins include pitching the first 11 innings of a 12-inning game, giving up one unearned run and defeating the Detroit Tigers 2–1 (April 26, 1960), a five-hit, complete-game victory over the Boston Red Sox, winning 10–1 (April 30, 1961), and a two-hit, complete-game shutout against the Minnesota Twins (May 21, 1961).

After his pitching career, Hawkins was a scout for the Indians, and served as the team's traveling secretary as well as in sales. Hawkins died on February 11, 2021, at his home in Canfield, Ohio.
