= Gina Satriano =

American criminal law prosecutor and baseball player

Gina Satriano is an Assistant District Attorney in the Los Angeles County District Attorney's Office, who pitched for the Colorado Silver Bullets, the first professional women's baseball team to compete again men. She was the first girl in the state of California to play Little League baseball.

== Early life ==
Satriano's father, Tom Satriano, was a catcher and a third baseman for the California Angels and Boston Red Sox, and can be credited for introducing her to the game. In the early 1970s, at the age of 7 she became the first girl to play Little League Baseball in California. Many parents, players and coaches opposed, and she wasn't allowed to play until her mother threatened a lawsuit. In high school, she wasn't allowed to play for the men's baseball team. She was allowed to try out for the men's team at University of California, Davis, but she was cut in the final round after throwing an 80 miles per hour pitch.
