= Hal Jones (baseball) =

American baseball player (born 1936)

- First baseman
- Born: April 19, 1936 (age 89); Louisiana, Missouri, U.S.
- Batted: Right Threw: Right

MLB debut
- April 25, 1961, for the Cleveland Indians

Last MLB appearance
- September 30, 1962, for the Cleveland Indians

MLB statistics
- Batting average: .216
- Home runs: 2
- Runs batted in: 5
- Stats at Baseball Reference

Teams
- Cleveland Indians (1961–1962)

Harold Marion Jones (born April 9, 1936) is an American former professional baseball player whose career lasted from 1956 to 1964.

Jones' professional career began in 1956 with the Negro league Kansas City Monarchs, whom he represented in that season's East–West All-Star Game.

A first baseman, he appeared in 17 games in Major League Baseball for portions of the 1961 and 1962 seasons for the Cleveland Indians. Jones was born in Louisiana, Missouri. He threw and batted right-handed, and was listed as 6 feet 2 inches (1.88 m) tall and 194 pounds (88 kg).

Jones was a power hitter in minor league baseball, amassing seasons of 97, 99, 104, 104 and 127 runs batted in in levels ranging from Class D to Triple-A. He also had seasons of 22, 24, 27, 34 and 35 home runs and batted .284 lifetime. In the majors, 16 of his 17 games came during September call-ups. He collected 11 hits during those auditions, with two homers—solo blows hit September 19, 1961, against Bill Kunkel, and October 1, 1961, off Art Fowler.
