= Jim Duckworth (baseball) =

American baseball player (1939–2025)

- Pitcher
- Born: May 24, 1939; National City, California, U.S.
- Died: November 11, 2025 (aged 86); Fort Mill, South Carolina, U.S.
- Batted: Right Threw: Right

MLB debut
- April 13, 1963, for the Washington Senators

Last MLB appearance
- July 24, 1966, for the Kansas City Athletics

MLB statistics
- Win–loss record: 7–25
- Earned run average: 5.26
- Strikeouts: 220
- Stats at Baseball Reference

Teams
- Washington Senators (1963–1966); Kansas City Athletics (1966)

James Raymond Duckworth (May 24, 1939 – November 11, 2025) was an American professional baseball pitcher. He played for 11 seasons, including four in Major League Baseball. He was a right-hander who stood 6 feet 4 inches (1.93 m) tall and weighed 194 pounds (88 kg) during his active career.

== Career ==
Duckworth was signed by the Brooklyn Dodgers as an amateur free agent in 1957. He was selected in the 1959 minor league draft by the Cincinnati Redlegs.

Duckworth had not yet been called up to the major leagues when the Washington Senators selected him in the 1962 Rule 5 draft. Duckworth was on Washington's 1963 opening day roster and won his first big league game in relief against the New York Yankees on May 26, 1963. While playing for the Senators in 1964, Duckworth missed a series in California due to his fear of flying. Washington docked him three days pay. On September 4, 1965, Duckworth struck out eight of the first nine Detroit Tigers batters he faced. He finished the game with 11 strikeouts in seven innings. In his next game he struck out 13 Twins in seven innings.

On June 23, 1966, the Senators traded Duckworth and a reported $20,000 to the Kansas City Athletics for Ken Harrelson. Five weeks later, on July 30, Kansas City traded Duckworth back to Washington. Duckworth played his last major league game with Kansas City on July 24, 1966.

As a big leaguer, Duckworth dropped 25 of his 32 decisions for a woeful .219 winning percentage, with an earned run average of 5.26. His 97 appearances included 29 starts, and he was credited with two complete games. As a relief pitcher, he registered four saves and 27 games finished. Duckworth allowed 256 hits and 148 bases on balls in 267 innings pitched, and racked up 220 strikeouts. With two hits in 59 at-bats, Duckworth had a career batting average in the major leagues of .034. He struck out 39 times.

Duckworth's final season in professional baseball was in 1967, when he played for the Hawaii Islanders in the minor leagues. After his baseball career ended, Duckworth was an officer with the California Highway Patrol.

== Death ==
Duckworth died in Fort Mill, South Carolina, on November 11, 2025, at the age of 86.
