= Dick Phillips =

American baseball player (1931–1998)

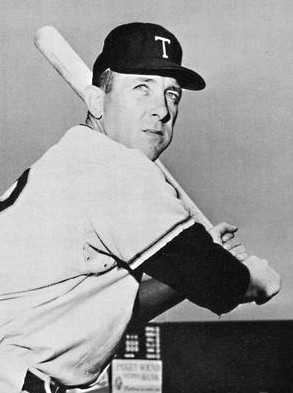
- First baseman
- Born: November 24, 1931; Racine, Wisconsin, U.S.
- Died: March 29, 1998 (aged 66); Burnaby, British Columbia, Canada
- Batted: Left Threw: Right

MLB debut
- April 15, 1962, for the San Francisco Giants

Last MLB appearance
- September 25, 1966, for the Washington Senators

MLB statistics
- Batting average: .229
- Home runs: 12
- Runs batted in: 60
- Stats at Baseball Reference

Teams
- San Francisco Giants (1962); Washington Senators (1963–1964, 1966)

Richard Eugene Phillips (November 24, 1931 – March 29, 1998) was an American professional baseball player, manager and coach. A native of Racine, Wisconsin, who attended Valparaiso University, Phillips batted left-handed, threw right-handed, stood 6 feet (1.8 m) tall and weighed 180 pounds (82 kg).

Phillips' playing career extended from 1951 through 1967, with time out for service in the United States Marine Corps during the Korean War. An outfielder when he broke into baseball, he later was a first baseman, second baseman and shortstop. He spent his first decade in professional baseball in the minor leagues, mostly in the farm systems of the Milwaukee Braves and San Francisco Giants.

After he won the 1961 Pacific Coast League MVP Award, the Giants gave the 30-year-old Phillips his first Major League opportunity at the outset of the 1962 season; however, he went hitless in three at bats and was returned to the minors at the May roster cutdown. The following season, the Giants sold Phillips' contract to the Washington Senators where he would spend the entire 1963 and 1964 campaigns on Washington's roster, starting 67 games at first base for the 1963 Senators and 52 more there in 1964. In 1965, he returned to the minors, as a first baseman with the Senators' Triple-A Hawaii Islanders affiliate. Apart from a late-season call-up in 1966, he spent the remainder of his playing career with Hawaii.

As a Major Leaguer, Phillips compiled a lifetime batting average of .229, with 136 hits, 12 home runs and 60 runs batted in.

Phillips remained in the game after his playing career ended, scouting for the Pittsburgh Pirates and managing in the farm systems of the Minnesota Twins, San Diego Padres and Milwaukee Brewers from 1973 to 1979 and 1981 to 1983. He also spent the 1980 season as a coach with the Padres under manager Jerry Coleman. In his final professional baseball assignments, he managed in independent league baseball in 1995–96.

Phillips served as manager of the PCL's Vancouver Canadians in 1982–83, and also was the team's assistant general manager during the early 1990s.

He died in Burnaby, British Columbia, at the age of 66.
