= Johnny James =

American baseball player (born 1933)

- Pitcher
- Born: July 23, 1933 (age 93); Bonners Ferry, Idaho, U.S.
- Batted: Left Threw: Right

MLB debut
- September 6, 1958, for the New York Yankees

Last MLB appearance
- October 1, 1961, for the Los Angeles Angels

MLB statistics
- Win–loss record: 5–3
- Earned run average: 4.76
- Strikeouts: 73
- Stats at Baseball Reference

Teams
- New York Yankees (1958, 1960–1961); Los Angeles Angels (1961)

John Phillip James (born July 23, 1933) is an American former Major League Baseball relief pitcher who played for the New York Yankees and Los Angeles Angels between 1958 and 1961. James was originally signed by the Yankees in 1953. He batted left-handed but threw right-handed, and he was 5 ft 10 in (1.78 m), 160 pounds (73 kg). He attended the University of Southern California.

In his 1958 debut season, he played in only one game. Appearing in relief for Art Ditmar (who had given up seven earned runs in six innings of work) on September 6, James pitched three innings of scoreless baseball, walking four batters and striking out one. He also had one at-bat in that game and struck out.

He did not play in the major leagues in 1959, but he did appear in 28 games in relief for the Yankees in 1960. He earned a spot on the team by being a part of a spring training no-hitter. In 43 innings of work, he posted a 5–1 record, allowing 21 earned runs and striking out 29 batters. He walked 26. He also saved two games.

1961 would end up being his final season in the majors. He pitched in only one game for the Yankees that year before being traded to the Angels with Ryne Duren for Tex Clevenger and Bob Cerv on May 8. In 36 games with the Angels, he posted a 5.30 ERA. Overall that season, he walked 54 batters and struck out 43. His record was 0–2. That season, James surrendered the 20th home run in Roger Maris' then-record 61 home run campaign.

His career ended on October 1 of that year. He had a 5–3 record in 66 career games, starting 3 games. In 119 innings of work, he walked 84 and struck out 73, finishing with a 4.76 ERA. Though he went hitless in 17 at-bats (striking out 8 times), he did score three runs. He was a perfect fielder, handling 25 total chances (4 putouts, 21 assists) for a 1.000 fielding percentage.

He wore three numbers in his career: 27 in 1958, 53 in 1959 and 1960, and 22 in 1961.
