= Bob Allen (1960s pitcher) =

American baseball player (1937–2023)

- Pitcher
- Born: October 23, 1937; Tatum, Texas, U.S.
- Died: December 12, 2023 (aged 86); Tatum, Texas, U.S.
- Batted: Left Threw: Left

MLB debut
- April 14, 1961, for the Cleveland Indians

Last MLB appearance
- September 27, 1967, for the Cleveland Indians

MLB statistics
- Win–loss record: 7–12
- Earned run average: 4.11
- Strikeouts: 199
- Stats at Baseball Reference

Teams
- Cleveland Indians (1961–1963, 1966–1967)

Robert Gray Allen (October 23, 1937 – December 12, 2023) was an American Major League Baseball pitcher. He batted and threw left-handed. He pitched for part or all of five seasons in Major League Baseball, all with the Cleveland Indians.

== Major League Baseball career ==
Allen was signed by the Indians as an amateur free agent in 1956. He had an impressive 1960 season with Cleveland's Mobile minor league affiliate with a 16–11 won-loss record. Allen made his major league debut on April 14, 1961, with the Cleveland Indians at age 23. On that day, Allen pitched to three hitters, all of whom he retired. Despite a record of 3–2 and 3.75 earned run average in 81 2/3 innings pitched, 1962 saw Allen's record slip to 1–1 with an earned run average of 5.87 in 30 2/3 innings. He spent much of 1962 with Cleveland's Salt Lake City farm club, posting a 5–2 record there.

Allen had a record of 1–2 and an ERA of 4.66 for Cleveland in 1963, pitching 56 innings. After the season, the Indians traded Allen to the Pittsburgh Pirates on December 14 for players to be named. The Pirates sent Allen back to Cleveland in April 1964. He appeared as a Pittsburgh Pirate on his 1964 Topps baseball card, #209, although he never appeared in a regular season major league game as a Pirate. He did not pitch in the major leagues in 1964 or 1965.

After years of working back to the Major Leagues, Allen had a record of 2–2 and a 4.21 ERA in 1966, pitching 51 1/3 innings. In 1967, Allen's record was 0–5 despite a 2.98 ERA, pitching 54 1/3 innings. Allen never pitched in the majors again. Allen had a lifetime 7–12 record, a 4.11 ERA, 132 walks, and 199 strikeouts. He never started a major league game, appearing as a reliever in 204 games and recording 19 saves. Allen was 4 for 31 with a lifetime batting average of .129. His lifetime fielding percentage was .944.

== Death ==
Allen died at an assisted living facility on December 12, 2023, at the age of 86.
