= Mike de la Hoz =

Cuban baseball player (1938–2023)

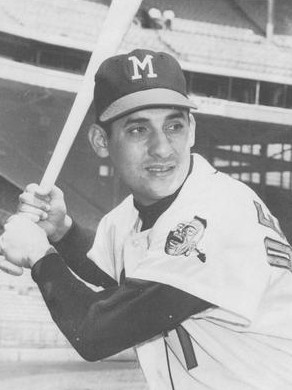
- Infielder
- Born: October 2, 1938; Havana, Cuba
- Died: May 28, 2023 (aged 84); Miami, Florida, U.S.
- Batted: Right Threw: Right

MLB debut
- July 22, 1960, for the Cleveland Indians

Last MLB appearance
- September 9, 1969, for the Cincinnati Reds

MLB statistics
- Batting average: .251
- Home runs: 25
- Runs batted in: 115

Teams
- Cleveland Indians (1960–1963); Milwaukee / Atlanta Braves (1964–1967); Cincinnati Reds (1969)

Miguel Angel de la Hoz Piloto (October 2, 1938 – May 28, 2023) was a Cuban Major League Baseball infielder.

De la Hoz was signed by the Cleveland Indians as an amateur free agent before the 1958 season, and played for the Indians from 1960 to 1963, the Milwaukee Braves / Atlanta Braves from 1964 to 1967, and the Cincinnati Reds in 1969. He was primarily a utility player.

De la Hoz made his major league debut at age 21 on July 22, 1960 for the Indians in a 6-4 loss to the Boston Red Sox at Fenway Park. Starting at shortstop and batting seventh, he notched his first career hit, a fourth-inning single off Ike Delock.

After four seasons with the Indians, he was traded to the Milwaukee Braves on April 1, 1964. He played four seasons with the Braves, the last two of which came after their move to Atlanta. He did not play in the majors in 1968, and finished his career in 1969, playing just one game with the Cincinnati Reds.

De la Hoz started a career-high 43 games in 1960, his rookie season, and 214 in all, with 83 coming at third base, 70 at second base, 60 at shortstop, and one in left field. He did his best work at second base, fielding .972 in 119 appearances. He was often used as a pinch hitter throughout his career.

On July 8, 1965, while playing for the Milwaukee Braves against the Houston Astros, De la Hoz hit a pinch home run in the bottom of the eighth inning off Dave Giusti, tied the game in the bottom of the ninth with an RBI single off Jim Owens, and singled and scored against Ron Taylor in the bottom of the 12th on a Frank Bolling single as the Braves won, 9–8.

De la Hoz's career batting totals for 494 games include 280 hits, 25 home runs, 115 runs batted in, 116 runs scored, a .251 batting average, and a slugging percentage of .365.

De la Hoz was a 2010 inductee into the Cuban Sports Hall of Fame (El Salón de la Fama del Deporte Cubano).

De la Hoz died in Miami, Florida, on May 28, 2023, at the age of 84.
