= Chapman Township, Saunders County, Nebraska =

Chapman Township
- Township
- Location in Saunders County
- Coordinates: 41°10′42″N 096°44′03″W
- Country: United States
- State: Nebraska
- County: Saunders

Area
  - Total: 36.23 sq mi (93.84 km^{2})
  - Land: 36.23 sq mi (93.84 km^{2})
  - Water: 0 sq mi (0 km^{2}) 0%
- Elevation: 1,362 ft (415 m)

Population (2020)
  - Total: 506
  - Density: 14.0/sq mi (5.39/km^{2})
- GNIS feature ID: 0837916

Chapman Township is one of twenty-four townships in Saunders County, Nebraska, United States. The population was 616 at the 2020 census. A 2021 estimate placed the township's population at 514.

The Village of Weston lies within the Township.

== See also ==
- County government in Nebraska
