= Chapman Township, Merrick County, Nebraska =

Chapman Township
- Township
- Location in Merrick County
- Coordinates: 41°01′47″N 098°09′16″W
- Country: United States
- State: Nebraska
- County: Merrick

Area
  - Total: 30.98 sq mi (80.25 km^{2})
  - Land: 30.41 sq mi (78.77 km^{2})
  - Water: 0.57 sq mi (1.48 km^{2}) 1.84%
- Elevation: 1,762 ft (537 m)

Population (2020)
  - Total: 488
  - Density: 16.0/sq mi (6.20/km^{2})
- GNIS feature ID: 0837915

Chapman Township is one of eleven townships in Merrick County, Nebraska, United States. The population was 488 at the 2020 census. A 2021 estimate placed the township's population at 488.

The Village of Chapman lies within the Township.

== See also ==
- County government in Nebraska
