= Bob Cerv =

American baseball player (1925–2017)

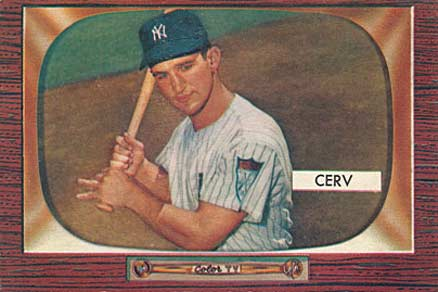
- Left fielder
- Born: May 5, 1925; Weston, Nebraska, U.S.
- Died: April 6, 2017 (aged 91); Blair, Nebraska, U.S.
- Batted: Right Threw: Right

MLB debut
- August 1, 1951, for the New York Yankees

Last MLB appearance
- July 29, 1962, for the Houston Colt .45s

MLB statistics
- Batting average: .276
- Home runs: 105
- Runs batted in: 374
- Stats at Baseball Reference

Teams
- New York Yankees (1951–1956); Kansas City Athletics (1957–1960); New York Yankees (1960); Los Angeles Angels (1961); New York Yankees (1961–1962); Houston Colt .45s (1962)

Career highlights and awards
- All-Star (1958); World Series champion (1956)

Robert Henry Cerv (/sərv/ sərv; May 5, 1925 – April 6, 2017) was an American professional baseball left fielder. Prior to his professional career, he was a collegiate baseball and basketball player at the University of Nebraska. He was born in Weston, Nebraska, and served in the U.S. Navy during World War II.

== Early life ==
Cerv was born on May 5, 1925, in Weston, Nebraska to Anton Henry and Henrietta (Staska) Cerv, and raised among a small ethnic Bohemian community. His father was a refrigerated truck driver. In 1937, Cerv's father drove the 11- or 12-year old Cerv with him on a trucking job to New York City, where they attended a New York Yankees doubleheader at Yankee Stadium; witnessing Hall of Fame first baseman Lou Gehrig hit three home runs. After that day, Cerv's goal in life was to play Major League Baseball (MLB), and to someday play at Yankee Stadium. He learned to play baseball from his three older sisters, who played competitive team softball.

He began playing Catholic Youth Organization (CYO) baseball at age 12, and at 15 joined his father and uncle playing semi-pro baseball in the Pioneer Night League. He attended Weston High School, graduating in 1943. He was All-State as a basketball player in high school, and led the basketball team to the Nebraska high school basketball tournament three times. At 16, he suffered a knee injury playing basketball, that bothered him throughout his life.

Cerv graduated high school in 1943, during World War II. He joined the United States Navy. Cerv served as a radar man on a destroyer, the USS Claxton, for two years. Among other engagements, he was on the Claxton during the Battle of Leyte Gulf. During that battle, on November 1, 1944, the Claxton was struck by a kamikaze pilot, seriously damaging the ship and killing five men.

He returned from the war in 1946, and entered the University of Nebraska-Lincoln, where he played on the baseball and basketball teams. He was a starting guard on the Cornhuskers basketball team for over three years, winning conference titles as a junior (1948-49) and senior (1949-50).

He was originally a catcher on the Cornhuskers baseball team, but moved to the outfield because of his speed. He was a four year starter (1947-50) under coach Tony Sharpe. He won two conference titles on the baseball team (1948, 1950). In 1950, he had a .467 batting average, and led the team with 36 runs batted in (RBI), 42 hits, 31 runs, 10 doubles, eight home runs, 81 total bases, and 12 stolen bases. His 1950 teammates voted him the team's most valuable player, for which he received the Roy Wythers Trophy. He was the first Nebraska player to be named an All-American in baseball. He was the first Nebraska athlete to letter for four years in both baseball and basketball.

== Professional career ==
=== New York Yankees ===
As a senior at Nebraska, Cerv was scouted by a number of professional baseball teams. The New York Yankees' Triple-A scout Joe McDermott signed Cerv as a free agent in 1950 for $6,000. Over his career, Cerv would play for the Yankees during three different periods. During his first stint with the Yankees, the team was in the midst of five consecutive World Series winning seasons (1949-53).

In 1950, Cerv was assigned to the Kansas City Blues, the Yankees' Triple-A affiliate in the American Association. He hit .304 in 94 games, with 14 home runs, 13 triples, 10 doubles, 49 runs scored, 49 RBIs and an .841 OPS (on-base plus slugging). Cerv began the 1951 season with the Blues. In only 109 games, he batted .344, with 28 home runs, 108 RBIs, 85 runs scored and a 1.094 OPS.

Cerv was called up to the Yankees on July 31. Yankees' Manager Casey Stengel had been impressed by Cerv during spring training because of Cerv's speed, hustle and determination, and eventually called him up to the Yankees because of the way he was hitting for Kansas City. He played some games in place of a struggling Mickle Mantle, who was sent down to Kansas City for a short time; but overall in 1951, Cerv only played in 12 games for the Yankees, hitting .214 in 28 at bats.

In 1952, the Yankees starting outfield consisted of Mantle in center field (.311 and 23 home runs), Hank Bauer in right field (.293 and 17 home runs) and Gene Woodling in left field (.309). Cerv started 15 games in left field and eight in centerfield, but hit only .241 in 87 at bats with one home run that season for the Yankees. He was sent back to Kansas City in July, where he hit .297, with 12 home runs and 47 RBIs in 60 games. This would be a recurrent theme during his first stint with the Yankees, where he would do well in minor league play, but could not win the starting job from Stengel over Woodling, and later Irv Noren or Elston Howard.

In 1953, he played a full season with the Blues, batting .317, with 22 home runs, 91 RBIs and a .933 OPS. He played in only eight games for the Yankees. In 1954, he played in 56 games for the Yankees and hit .260 in 100 at bats. In 1955, he played in 55 games for the Yankees, but hit .341 in 96 at bats. He played in five games during the 1955 World Series against the Brooklyn Dodgers, which the Dodgers won in seven games. Cerv hit .125 in 16 at bats, but had a pinch hit home run against Roger Craig in Game 5. As a reserve outfielder in 1956, he hit .304 in 115 at bats, with three home runs and 25 RBIs. He had one hit in one at bat in the 1956 World Series.

=== Kansas City Athletics ===
==== Enos Slaughter and sale to the A's ====
On August 25, 1956, the Yankees waived long time shortstop Phil Rizzuto and acquired Enos Slaughter from the Kansas City Athletics. It was reported at the time that in exchange for Slaughter, the Yankees would provide "'a player on their present roster'" to the A's at the end of the 1956 season. Despite Slaughter being acquired via waivers, and the trading deadline having passed on June 15, A's owner Arnold Johnson (who had a close business relationship with the Yankees' ownership) said on the day Slaughter was claimed off of waivers by the Yankees, that in exchange for Slaughter the A's would receive a Yankees player who was a regular on the Yankees' team. Johnson further publicly promised that Yankee player would become a regular player for the A's in 1957.

During the second half of the 1950s, the Yankees and A's carried out a number of transactions that typically favored the Yankees to such a degree the A's of that period have been called a Yankees farm team. Slaughter played his first game for the Yankees on August 26, 1956. This allowed him to both help the Yankees toward the 1956 AL pennant, and be eligible to participate in the 1956 World Series.

In mid-October 1956, the Yankees sold Cerv's rights to the Athletics. It was reported that this was to complete the transaction for Enos Slaughter; but it was also reported at the time that the Yankees denied the two transactions were related (despite what Arnold Johnson said the day he waived Slaughter and the Yankees acquired him). Even before the sale of his contract to the A's, however, there was anticipation that Cerv would be the Yankee moved to the A's to compensate them for Slaughter. Cerv later said that during a hot September day in 1956, he had pitched batting practice and was sitting alone in the dugout. He said Stengel came up to him in the dugout and said "We just received (Enos) Slaughter from Kansas City and by the way one of you guys is going to KC".

According to sportswriter Robert Creamer, interviewed for the Ken Burns series Baseball, one afternoon in 1956, Yankees manager Casey Stengel approached Cerv in the Yankees' dugout, sat down nearby, and commented, "There's not many people that know this, but one of us has been traded to Kansas City." However, this sequence of events did not really happen. (Note: It is possible, however, something was in the works involving moving Cerv to Kansas City at the very end of the 1956 season, where Stengel could have let Cerv know that a sale had been agreed to take place between the two clubs once the post-season ban on such transactions expired.) In fact, Cerv was sold for cash to the Kansas City Athletics on October 15, 1956, five days after the Yankees had ended the 1956 World Series with a Game 7 victory over the Dodgers at Ebbets Field. By the 15th, the dugouts and clubhouse at Yankee Stadium had all been emptied and the players returned home. However, Cerv himself years later described a somewhat similar conversation with Stengel occurring in September, during the season; and the A's owner Arnold Johnson publicly said in late August that the Yankees were going to send the A's a player in exchange for the A's allowing the Yankees to obtain Slaughter via waiver on August 25.

==== A's (1957-60) ====
Cerv prospered as a regular in Kansas City from 1957 to 1959. His career highs in games played all occurred for the A's. He played all three outfield positions, starting 77 games out of the 124 games in which he appeared in 1957. In 1958, he started a career high 135 games, all in left field; and in 1959 he started 118 games in left field. He never started more than 65 games in any other season, and never started more than 38 games in a season where he did not play for the A's.

His best season was 1958, when he hit .305, and had career highs with 38 home runs, 104 RBIs, 94 runs scored, 50 bases on balls and a .963 OPS. The 38 home runs were an A's team record. He was elected to the American League All-Star team for the first and only time, beating out Ted Williams for the starting spot in left field. He was the AL's cleanup hitter, going 1-for-2 with an intentional walk. He also finished fourth in the AL Most Valuable Player voting that year, just above Mantle. He was selected to United Press International's American League All-Star team at the end of the season.

He did all of this in 1958, while playing injured part of the season. He suffered a broken jaw in a collision at home plate with Detroit Tigers catcher Red Wilson. He had his jaw wired shut for a month and was on a liquid diet during that time; sometimes requiring oxygen during games when he had difficulty breathing. As the only bright spot, and most popular player, on a bad team, the A's honored Cerv during a July 1958 home game. Former President Harry S. Truman, with whom Cerv developed a friendship, attended the event.

Cerv followed up in 1959 with 20 homers, 87 RBIs and a .285 batting average. On August 20, 1959, Cerv hit three home runs against the Boston Red Sox in an 11–10 loss. In 1959, he led the A's in home runs and RBIs; was second in batting average for A's players with over 500 plate appearances; and was fourth on the team in runs scored. During that year's spring training, Cerv participated in the television series Home Run Derby, where he defeated future Hall of Fame outfielder, and the 10th highest all-time player in MLB history for home runs (586), Frank Robinson. Cerv was known for his power, and once hit a 529-foot (161.2 m) home run while playing for the A's.

=== Yankees, Los Angeles Angels, Houston Colt 45s ===
In 1960, the 35-year old Cerv was hitting .256, with six home runs and 12 RBIs in 23 games for the A's, when he was traded back to the Yankees for 28-year old third baseman Andy Carey on May 19. Carey had played in four games for the Yankees that season, with three at bats, at the time of the trade. Carey had missed most of the 1959 season due to illness, and had lost his third base job to Gil McDougald and Clete Boyer in 1960. It was the 16th deal between the A's and Yankees since the A's had moved to Kansas City in 1955.

Cerv played 87 games for the Yankees, starting 44 in left field. He hit .250, with eight home runs, 28 RBIs and 32 runs scored. He hit .357 in the Yankees seven game 1960 World Series loss to the Pittsburgh Pirates. Manager Stengel decided to start Cerv in Game 3 in left field, and made the unusual move of batting Cerv as the leadoff hitter, emphasizing the Yankees' power hitting. Cerv also started in left field in Game 4 as the Yankees' leadoff hitter. He went 2-for-5 and 1-for-4, respectively in the two games as a leadoff hitter. In Game 3, Cerv became the 11th player in World Series history to have two hits in the same inning. He also started Game 5 in left field, batting third (between Roger Maris and Mickey Mantle), again going 1-for-4. Yogi Berra started in left field for the final two games of the series.

The Yankees left Cerv exposed in the December 1960 expansion draft, and the Los Angeles Angels selected him with the 38th overall pick. Cerv was in the starting lineup for the Angel franchise's inaugural game on April 11, 1961. In that game, he hit a home run against Baltimore Orioles starting pitcher Milt Pappas, after Pappas had just given up the first home run in Angels' history to Ted Kluszewski. Cerv played in only 18 games for the Angels, and was batting .158, when the Yankees traded Lee Thomas, Ryne Duren and Johnny James for Cerv and Tex Clevenger on May 8. He rejoined a Yankees team that went on to win the 1961 World Series, with teammate Roger Maris hitting 61 home runs, the most ever in a season at that time.

Cerv played in 57 games for the Yankees in 1961, hitting .271, with six home runs and 20 RBIs. The 36-year old Cerv started 24 games in left field and three at first base. Cerv and Maris had played together in Kansas City in 1958 and 1959 and became good friends. Maris was traded to the Yankees in December 1959, so Cerv had rejoined Maris in 1960, as well as in 1961. During the 1961 season, Cerv lived in a $251-per-month (equivalent to $2,704 in 2025) apartment in Queens with Maris and Mickey Mantle.

On September 23, 1961, Cerv was pinch hitting against the Boston Red Sox, in Boston, when he felt a sharp pain in his knee after swinging at a pitch. He hit a home run on the next pitch, but knew something was wrong. He had surgery on his knee the next day in Boston, and his knee was never the same. Maris hit his record-setting 61st home run in Boston on October 1, and then visited with Cerv in the hospital that day.

After his 1961 knee operation, Cerv was slow to recover. He played in 20 games for the Yankees in 1962, with a .118 batting average, when the team sold his contract rights in late June to the Houston Colt .45s, who released him in August. He went to spring training with the Mets in 1963, but was waived. Mets' president George Weiss, who had been the Yankees' general manager during Cerv's years with them, offered Cerv a job with the Mets' organization; but Cerv wanted to return to his wife and family.

In his career, Cerv had a .276 batting average and 105 home runs, including 12 pinch hit home runs (an American League record at the time his career ended). He had 624 hits in 2,261 at-bats, with 374 RBI and an .821 OPS.

== Coaching career ==
Following Cerv's big league career, he coached college baseball at Southeast Missouri State College. From 1965 to 1974, Cerv taught at John F. Kennedy College in Wahoo, Nebraska, where he also coached the men's baseball and basketball teams. He also coached baseball at Sioux Empire College in Hawarden, Iowa, from 1976 to 1981.

During the summers, he coached a semi-pro team of top collegians, the Liberal BeeJays in Liberal, Kansas. His team won a national championship in 1979 and came in second best in 1980. Players he coached in Liberal included, among others, future MLB players Ron Guidry and Doug Drabek, who won Cy Young Awards; as well as Mike Hargrove and Phil Garner who also became MLB managers, Steve Kemp and Rick Honeycutt.

== Legacy and honors ==
Although Cerv was never a regular playing for the Yankees, he played an important role in their success. Tony Kubek, a three-year All-Star and Rookie of the Year in his nine-season Yankee career (1957-65) said "'Cerv was a great asset for a Casey Stengel-type manager. He could use him as a pinch-hitter or a pinch-runner. When he was a pinch-runner, Mickey would stand at the dugout steps and yell to infielders, ‘Here comes Cerv!’ I think he scared a few guys'".

In 2000, Sports Illustrated named Cerv No. 28 among its list of Nebraska athletes of the century.

== Personal life and death ==
Cerv married Phyllis Pelton in 1948, and they had 10 children. He took great pride in assuring his children's education. Among others, he had a son who graduated the United States Military Academy at West Point and a daughter who headed a hospital's cardiovascular department. Phyllis Cerv died in 2005. Cerv died on April 6, 2017, in Blair, Nebraska, aged 91. He was survived by eight children, 32 grandchildren and 20 great-grandchildren.

== In media ==
Cerv was portrayed by actor Chris Bauer in 61*, a 2001 HBO movie directed by Billy Crystal about the 1961 New York Yankees season in which Roger Maris and Mickey Mantle attempted to break the single-season record of 60 home runs established by Babe Ruth in 1927.
