= Ken Hunt (outfielder) =

American baseball player (1934-1997)

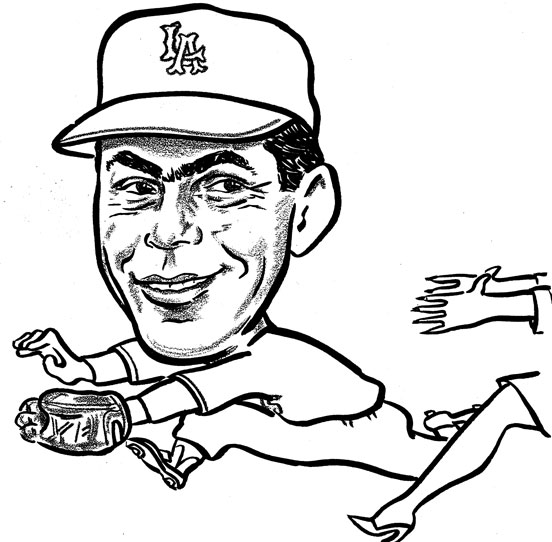
- Outfielder
- Born: July 13, 1934; Grand Forks, North Dakota, U.S.
- Died: June 8, 1997 (aged 62); Gardena, California, U.S.
- Batted: Right Threw: Right

MLB debut
- September 10, 1959, for the New York Yankees

Last MLB appearance
- October 4, 1964, for the Washington Senators

MLB statistics
- Batting average: .226
- Home runs: 33
- Runs batted in: 111
- Stats at Baseball Reference

Teams
- New York Yankees (1959–1960); Los Angeles Angels (1961–1963); Washington Senators (1963–1964)

Kenneth Lawrence Hunt (July 13, 1934 – June 8, 1997) was an American professional baseball player who appeared in six Major League seasons for the New York Yankees, Los Angeles Angels and Washington Senators (1959–64). An outfielder, the native of Grand Forks, North Dakota, threw and batted right-handed, stood 6 feet 1 inch (1.85 m) and weighed 205 pounds (93 kg).

After two trials with the 1959–60 Yankees, Hunt was selected by the new Los Angeles Angels franchise in the 1960 Major League Baseball expansion draft. He was in the Opening Day starting lineup for the first game in the Angels' history, playing center field on April 11, 1961 in a 7-2 road victory over the Baltimore Orioles.

Playing at the Angels' cozy Wrigley Field home park in 1961, Hunt bashed 25 home runs and knocked in 84 RBI in 149 games played — one of five Angels to crack the 20 home run mark in their maiden American League season. However, surgery to repair an aneurysm near his throwing shoulder ruined his 1962 season, and Hunt never regained his productive stroke.

All told, he appeared in 310 MLB games, and batted .226 with 177 hits.

He was the stepfather of actor Butch Patrick, who as a child played Eddie Munster on The Munsters. Hunt appeared in a 1965 episode of that show, titled "Herman the Rookie".

In 1997 the Hunts were planning to return to Fargo for his 14th consecutive appearance at the Roger Maris tournament. On June 8 Hunt decided to watch his old team, now the Anaheim Angels, on television. He was particularly interested in following a fellow North Dakotan, Angels outfielder Darin Erstad. When his wife, Sherry, returned home later that evening, she found Ken dead from a heart attack. He was 62 years old.
