= Ken Hamlin (baseball) =

American baseball player (born 1935)

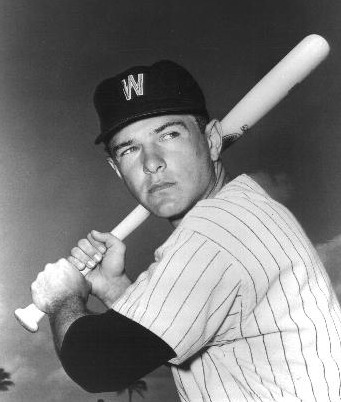
- Shortstop / Second baseman
- Born: May 18, 1935 (age 89); Detroit, Michigan, U.S.
- Batted: Right Threw: Right

MLB debut
- June 17, 1957, for the Pittsburgh Pirates

Last MLB appearance
- September 26, 1966, for the Washington Senators

MLB statistics
- Batting average: .241
- Home runs: 11
- Runs batted in: 89
- Stats at Baseball Reference

Teams
- Pittsburgh Pirates (1957, 1959); Kansas City Athletics (1960); Los Angeles Angels (1961); Washington Senators (1962, 1965–1966)

Kenneth Lee Hamlin (born May 18, 1935) is an American former Major League Baseball shortstop /second baseman. He was signed by the Pittsburgh Pirates as an amateur free agent on June 3, 1957, and played for the Pirates (1957, 1959), Kansas City Athletics (1960), Los Angeles Angels (1961), and Washington Senators (1962, 1965–66).

== Career ==
Born in Detroit, Hamlin attended Western Michigan University. He made his big league debut for the Pirates two weeks after he signed with them, but only played in five games for them in his two short stays there. He was traded to the Kansas City A's as part of a multi-player deal that headlined pitcher Dick Hall and catcher–third baseman Hal Smith on December 9, 1959.

He was a good fielder but not strong with the bat. He was in the starting lineup in 366 of the 468 major league games he played in. He received most of his playing time with weaker teams, including the 1960 A's (58–96), 1962 Senators (60–101), and 1965 Senators (70–92).

Career totals include 323 hits, 11 home runs, 89 runs batted in, 372 runs scored, a .241 batting average, a .304 on-base percentage, and a slugging percentage of .311. His lifetime fielding percentage was .963, which was right around the league average during his era.

Career highlights include:

- hit two home runs with four RBI vs. the Detroit Tigers (July 19, 1965)
- one 5-RBI game, including a grand slam and a run-scoring double vs. the Boston Red Sox (July 27, 1962 – game 2)
- two 4-hit games...4 singles vs. the Washington Senators (August 9, 1960 – game 2) and two singles and two doubles vs. the Detroit Tigers (July 2, 1965)
- seventeen 3-hit games

In his retirement years, Hamlin founded and ran Tall Timbers, a sports camp with a baseball emphasis, in Climax, Michigan.
