= Jim Pisoni =

American baseball player (1929-2007)

- Outfielder
- Born: August 14, 1929; St. Louis, Missouri, U.S.
- Died: February 4, 2007 (aged 77); Dallas, Texas, U.S.
- Batted: Right Threw: Right

MLB debut
- September 25, 1953, for the St. Louis Browns

Last MLB appearance
- October 2, 1960, for the New York Yankees

MLB statistics
- Batting average: .212
- Home runs: 6
- Runs batted in: 20
- Stats at Baseball Reference

Teams
- St. Louis Browns (1953); Kansas City Athletics (1956–1957); Milwaukee Braves (1959); New York Yankees (1959–1960)

James Peter Pisoni (August 14, 1929 – February 4, 2007) was an American professional baseball player, a backup outfielder in Major League Baseball. Pisoni played mainly as a center fielder for four teams between 1953 and 1960. Listed at 5 feet 10 inches (1.78 m), 169 pounds (77 kg), he batted and threw right-handed, and was born in St. Louis, Missouri.

Pisoni will forever be known among baseball fans and historians as the last player to debut in a St. Louis Browns uniform. He was signed by the Browns before the 1949 season, but he spent two years in the military during the Korean War before joining St. Louis on September 25, 1953, becoming the last rookie to debut with the Browns before they moved to Baltimore and became the Orioles. He appeared in all three remaining games, including playing in the Browns closer on September 29.

However, Pisoni never played for Baltimore. He went back to the minor leagues and three years later the Orioles traded him to the Kansas City Athletics. He played for them from 1956 to 1957, before joining the Milwaukee Braves (1959) and New York Yankees (1959–60).

In a five-season career, Pisoni hit .212 (40-for-189) with six home runs and 20 RBI in 103 games, including 26 runs, three doubles and three triples. Following his baseball retirement, he worked as an electrical contractor.

Pisoni died in Dallas, Texas, at the age of 77.
