= Ron Moeller =

American baseball player (1938–2009)

- Pitcher
- Born: October 13, 1938; Cincinnati, Ohio, U.S.
- Died: November 2, 2009 (aged 71); Cincinnati, Ohio, U.S.
- Batted: Left Threw: Left

MLB debut
- September 8, 1956, for the Baltimore Orioles

Last MLB appearance
- September 25, 1963, for the Washington Senators

MLB statistics
- Win–loss record: 6–9
- Earned run average: 5.78
- Strikeouts: 104
- Stats at Baseball Reference

Teams
- Baltimore Orioles (1956, 1958); Los Angeles Angels (1961, 1963); Washington Senators (1963)

Ronald Ralph Moeller (October 13, 1938 – November 2, 2009) was a pitcher in Major League Baseball who played between 1956 and 1963 for the Baltimore Orioles (1956, 1958), Los Angeles Angels (1961 and 1963) and Washington Senators (1963). Listed at 6 feet (1.8 m) tall and 180 pounds (82 kg), Moeller batted and threw left-handed. He was born in Cincinnati.

At start of his MLB career, Moeller was nicknamed The Kid by the Orioles players both for his boyish looks and making his big-league debut at age seventeen. He pitched in part of two seasons for Baltimore before his selection by the Angels in the expansion draft following the 1960 season. His most productive campaign came in 1961 with the Angels, when he posted career-best numbers in wins (4), strikeouts (83) and innings pitched (112 2/3), including a 3–0 six-hit shutout with nine strikeouts against his former Orioles team on June 5. In 1963, his last major league season, Moeller went 2–0 in three starts for the Senators.

In a four-season career, Moeller posted a 6–9 record with a 5.78 ERA in 52 appearances, including 22 starts, 104 strikeouts, and 100 walks in 152 2/3 innings of work. He also pitched in the minor leagues from 1956 through 1963, compiling a 37–38 record with a 3,30 ERA in 118 games, 94 as a starter.

Moeller died in his native Cincinnati at the age of 71. He was married and had two children and four grandchildren.
