= 1965 Cleveland Indians season =

1965 Cleveland Indians
- League: American League
- Ballpark: Cleveland Municipal Stadium
- City: Cleveland, Ohio
- Owners: Gabe Paul
- General managers: Gabe Paul
- Managers: Birdie Tebbetts
- Television: WJW-TV (Harry Jones, Herb Score)
- Radio: WERE (Jimmy Dudley, Bob Neal)

The 1965 Cleveland Indians season was a season in American baseball. The team finished fifth in the American League with a record of 87–75, 15 games behind the Minnesota Twins. The Indians played .500 ball for the first 40 games, then eventually heated up going on a 10-game winning streak at one point improving their record to 37–24. They would peak at 46–28, but would cool off significantly after the All-Star break (going 41–47 the rest of the way) and would only spend six days in first place. Still, the Indians 87–75 record would be the best win–loss record they would post between 1959 and 1994. This season also marked the return of Rocky Colavito. This led to an increase in attendance (a season after the Indians almost left Cleveland, due to low attendance). The trade itself ended up being a disaster in the long run, even though it was successful short term (for one season). The Indians were the only team to win the regular season series vs the AL pennant winning Twins (who would lose to the Dodgers in 7 games in the 1965 World Series).

== Offseason ==
- October 21, 1964: Ralph Terry was sent to the Indians by the New York Yankees to partially complete an earlier deal made on September 5 (the Yankees sent players to be named later and $75,000 to the Indians for Pedro Ramos). The deal was completed on November 27, when the Indians received Bud Daley from the Yankees.
- December 1, 1964: Woodie Held and Bob Chance were traded by the Indians to the Washington Senators for Chuck Hinton.
- January 20, 1965: Tommie Agee, Tommy John and Johnny Romano were traded by the Indians to the Chicago White Sox as part of a 3-team trade. The White Sox sent Cam Carreon to the Indians, and Jim Landis, Mike Hershberger and a player to be named later to the Kansas City Athletics. The Athletics sent Rocky Colavito to the Indians. The White Sox completed the deal by sending Fred Talbot to the Athletics on February 10, 1965.
- January 30, 1965: Oscar Zamora was signed as an amateur free agent by the Indians.

== Regular season ==
=== Season standings ===
American League
Team	W	L	Pct.	GB	Home	Road
Minnesota Twins	102	60	.630	—	51‍–‍30	51‍–‍30
Chicago White Sox	95	67	.586	7	48‍–‍33	47‍–‍34
Baltimore Orioles	94	68	.580	8	46‍–‍33	48‍–‍35
Detroit Tigers	89	73	.549	13	47‍–‍34	42‍–‍39
Cleveland Indians	87	75	.537	15	52‍–‍30	35‍–‍45
New York Yankees	77	85	.475	25	40‍–‍43	37‍–‍42
Los Angeles / California Angels	75	87	.463	27	46‍–‍34	29‍–‍53
Washington Senators	70	92	.432	32	36‍–‍45	34‍–‍47
Boston Red Sox	62	100	.383	40	34‍–‍47	28‍–‍53
Kansas City Athletics	59	103	.364	43	33‍–‍48	26‍–‍55

=== Record vs. opponents ===
1965 American League record Sources:
Team	BAL	BOS	CWS	CLE	DET	KCA	LAA	MIN	NYY	WAS
Baltimore	—	11–7	9–9	10–8	11–7	11–7	13–5	8–10	13–5	8–10
Boston	7–11	—	4–14	8–10	6–12	11–7	5–13	1–17	9–9	11–7
Chicago	9–9	14–4	—	10–8	9–9	13–5	12–6	7–11	8–10	13–5
Cleveland	8–10	10–8	8–10	—	9–9	9–9	9–9	11–7	12–6	11–7
Detroit	7–11	12–6	9–9	9–9	—	13–5	10–8	8–10	10–8	11–7
Kansas City	7–11	7–11	5–13	9–9	5–13	—	5–13	8–10	7–11	6–12
Los Angeles / California	5–13	13–5	6–12	9–9	8–10	13–5	—	9–9	6–12	6–12
Minnesota	10–8	17–1	11–7	7–11	10–8	10–8	9–9	—	13–5	15–3
New York	5–13	9–9	10–8	6–12	8–10	11–7	12–6	5–13	—	11–7
Washington	10–8	7–11	5–13	7–11	7–11	12–6	12–6	3–15	7–11	—

NOTE: The Los Angeles Angels changed their name to California Angels on September 2, 1965, with the season in progress.

=== Notable transactions ===
- May 3, 1965: Joe Rudi was selected off waivers by the Indians from the Kansas City Athletics as a first-year waiver pick.
- June 8, 1965: Ray Fosse was drafted by the Indians in the 1st round (7th pick) of the 1965 Major League Baseball draft.
- June 15, 1965: The Indians traded a player to be named later and cash to the California Angels for Phil Roof. The Indians completed the deal by sending Bubba Morton to the Angels on September 15.

=== Opening Day Lineup ===
Opening Day Starters
#	Name	Position
18	Dick Howser	SS
23	Chuck Hinton	1B
27	Leon Wagner	LF
21	Rocky Colavito	RF
10	Max Alvis	3B
25	Vic Davalillo	CF
16	Larry Brown	2B
6	Joe Azcue	C
32	Ralph Terry	P

=== Roster ===
1965 Cleveland Indians
Roster
Pitchers: 39 Gary Bell; 30 Dick Donovan; 34 Steve Hargan; 41 Mike Hedlund; 45 Tom Kelley; 31 Jack Kralick; 48 Sam McDowell; 44 Don McMahon; 42 Sonny Siebert; 49 Jack Spring; 43 Lee Stange; 32 Ralph Terry; 33 Luis Tiant; 36 Bobby Tiefenauer; 35 Floyd Weaver; 40 Stan Williams	Catchers: 6 Joe Azcue; 7 Cam Carreon; 7 Phil Roof; 9 Duke Sims; Infielders: 10 Max Alvis; 6 George Banks; 50 Ray Barker; 16 Larry Brown; 24 Pedro González; 18 Dick Howser; 11 Billy Moran; 17 Chico Salmon; 15 Fred Whitfield	Outfielders: 20 Lou Clinton; 21 Rocky Colavito; 25 Vic Davalillo; 23 Chuck Hinton; 22 Al Luplow; 27 Leon Wagner; Other batters: 12 Bill Davis; 13 Ralph Gagliano; 14 Tony Martínez; 25,28 Richie Scheinblum	Manager: 1 Birdie Tebbetts; Coaches: 4 Solly Hemus (First Base); 3 George Strickland (Third Base); 2 Early Wynn (Pitching)

== Player stats ==
=== Batting ===
==== Starters by position ====
Note: Pos = Position; G = Games played; AB = At bats; H = Hits; Avg. = Batting average; HR = Home runs; RBI = Runs batted in

Pos	Player	G	AB	H	Avg.	HR	RBI
C	Joe Azcue	111	335	77	.230	2	35
1B	Fred Whitfield	132	468	137	.293	26	90
2B	Pedro González	116	400	101	.253	5	39
SS	Larry Brown	124	438	111	.253	8	40
3B	Max Alvis	159	604	149	.247	21	61
LF	Leon Wagner	144	517	152	.294	28	79
CF	Vic Davalillo	142	505	152	.301	5	40
RF	Rocky Colavito	162	592	170	.287	26	108

==== Other batters ====
Note: G = Games played; AB = At bats; H = Hits; Avg. = Batting average; HR = Home runs; RBI = Runs batted in

Player	G	AB	H	Avg.	HR	RBI
Chuck Hinton	133	431	110	.255	18	54
Dick Howser	107	307	72	.235	1	6
Chico Salmon	79	120	29	.242	3	12
Duke Sims	48	118	21	.178	6	15
Cam Carreon	19	52	12	.231	1	7
Phil Roof	43	52	9	.173	0	3
Al Luplow	53	45	6	.133	1	4
Lou Clinton	12	34	6	.176	1	2
Billy Moran	22	24	3	.125	0	0
Bill Davis	10	10	3	.300	0	0
Ray Barker	11	6	0	.000	0	0
George Banks	4	5	1	.200	0	0
Tony Martínez	4	3	0	.000	0	0
Richie Scheinblum	4	1	0	.000	0	0
Ralph Gagliano	1	0	0	----	0	0

=== Pitching ===
==== Starting pitchers ====
Note: G = Games pitched; IP = Innings pitched; W = Wins; L = Losses; ERA = Earned run average; SO = Strikeouts

Player	G	IP	W	L	ERA	SO
Sam McDowell	42	273.0	17	11	2.18	325
Luis Tiant	41	196.1	11	11	3.53	152
Sonny Siebert	39	188.2	16	8	2.43	191
Ralph Terry	30	165.2	11	6	3.69	84
Tom Kelley	4	30.0	2	1	2.40	31

==== Other pitchers ====
Note: G = Games pitched; IP = Innings pitched; W = Wins; L = Losses; ERA = Earned run average; SO = Strikeouts

Player	G	IP	W	L	ERA	SO
Lee Stange	41	132.0	8	4	3.34	80
Jack Kralick	30	86.0	5	11	4.92	34
Steve Hargan	17	60.1	4	3	3.43	37
Dick Donovan	12	22.2	1	3	5.96	12

==== Relief pitchers ====
Note: G = Games pitched; W = Wins; L = Losses; SV = Saves; ERA = Earned run average; SO = Strikeouts

Player	G	W	L	SV	ERA	SO
Gary Bell	60	6	5	17	3.04	86
Don McMahon	58	3	3	11	3.28	60
Floyd Weaver	32	2	2	1	5.43	37
Bobby Tiefenauer	15	0	5	4	4.84	13
Jack Spring	14	1	2	0	3.74	9
Mike Hedlund	6	0	0	0	5.06	4
Stan Williams	3	0	0	0	6.23	1

== Farm system ==
Level	Team	League	Manager
AAA	Portland Beavers	Pacific Coast League	Johnny Lipon
AA	Reading Indians	Eastern League	Whitey Kurowski
A	Salinas Indians	California League	Phil Cavarretta
A	Dubuque Packers	Midwest League	Elmer Valo
