= 1965 Kansas City Athletics season =

1965 Kansas City Athletics
- League: American League
- Ballpark: Municipal Stadium
- City: Kansas City, Missouri
- Record: 59–103 (.364)
- League place: 10th
- Owners: Charles O. Finley
- General managers: Pat Friday, Hank Peters
- Managers: Mel McGaha, Haywood Sullivan
- Television: KCMO
- Radio: KCMO (AM) (Monte Moore, Red Rush)

The 1965 Kansas City Athletics season was the 11th for the franchise in Kansas City and the 65th in its overall history. It involved the A's finishing tenth in the American League with a record of 59 wins and 103 losses, 43 games behind the American League Champion Minnesota Twins. The paid attendance for the season was 528,344, the lowest in the major leagues (and the lowest ever by the A's in Kansas City). The club won 59 games, their worst showing since the A's moved to Kansas City.

== Offseason ==
- January 20, 1965: Rocky Colavito was traded by the Athletics to the Cleveland Indians as part of a three-team trade. Jim Landis, Mike Hershberger and a player to be named later were sent by the Chicago White Sox to the Athletics. Tommy John, Tommie Agee and Johnny Romano were sent by the Indians to the White Sox, and Cam Carreon was sent by the White Sox to the Indians. The White Sox completed the deal by sending Fred Talbot to the Athletics on February 10.

== Regular season ==
- April 6, 1965: Hank Peters was named general manager.
- The A's lost 21 of their first 26 games. On May 15, manager Mel McGaha was replaced by AAA manager Haywood Sullivan. At the age of 34, Sullivan was the youngest manager in the major leagues.
- Owner Charlie Finley steadily built up the team's farm system. He was assisted by the creation of the baseball draft in 1965, which forced young prospects to sign with the team that drafted them—at the price offered by the team—if they wanted to play professional baseball. Thus, Finley was spared from having to compete with wealthier teams for top talent. The Athletics, owners of the worst record in the American League in 1964, had the first pick in the first draft, selecting Rick Monday on June 8, 1965.

=== Promotions ===
- Club owner Charlie Finley had a pitchometer on the scoreboard. In an attempt to speed up the game, it was a way to measure the time a pitcher spent in between pitches thrown. Finley installed a small zoo in the club picnic area to generate interest in the ball club with small children.
- September 8, 1965: The Campy Camp Night promotion was held as Bert Campaneris played every position in the field.
- In a promotional move, Finley signed Satchel Paige on September 10, 58 years old at the time, for one game. On September 25, against the Boston Red Sox, Finley invited several Negro league veterans, including Cool Papa Bell, to be introduced before the game. Paige was in the bullpen, sitting on a rocking chair, being served coffee by a "nurse" between innings. He started the game by getting Jim Gosger out on a pop foul. The next man, Dalton Jones, reached first and went to second on an infield error, but was thrown out trying to reach third on a pitch in the dirt. Carl Yastrzemski doubled and Tony Conigliaro hit a fly ball to end the inning. The next six batters went down in order, including a strikeout of Bill Monbouquette. In the fourth inning, Paige took the mound, to be removed according to plan by Haywood Sullivan. He walked off to a boisterous ovation despite the small crowd of 9,000. The lights dimmed and, led by the PA announcer, the fans lit matches and cigarette lighters while singing "The Old Gray Mare."

=== Season standings ===
American League
Team	W	L	Pct.	GB	Home	Road
Minnesota Twins	102	60	.630	—	51‍–‍30	51‍–‍30
Chicago White Sox	95	67	.586	7	48‍–‍33	47‍–‍34
Baltimore Orioles	94	68	.580	8	46‍–‍33	48‍–‍35
Detroit Tigers	89	73	.549	13	47‍–‍34	42‍–‍39
Cleveland Indians	87	75	.537	15	52‍–‍30	35‍–‍45
New York Yankees	77	85	.475	25	40‍–‍43	37‍–‍42
Los Angeles / California Angels	75	87	.463	27	46‍–‍34	29‍–‍53
Washington Senators	70	92	.432	32	36‍–‍45	34‍–‍47
Boston Red Sox	62	100	.383	40	34‍–‍47	28‍–‍53
Kansas City Athletics	59	103	.364	43	33‍–‍48	26‍–‍55

=== Record vs. opponents ===
1965 American League record Sources:
Team	BAL	BOS	CWS	CLE	DET	KCA	LAA	MIN	NYY	WAS
Baltimore	—	11–7	9–9	10–8	11–7	11–7	13–5	8–10	13–5	8–10
Boston	7–11	—	4–14	8–10	6–12	11–7	5–13	1–17	9–9	11–7
Chicago	9–9	14–4	—	10–8	9–9	13–5	12–6	7–11	8–10	13–5
Cleveland	8–10	10–8	8–10	—	9–9	9–9	9–9	11–7	12–6	11–7
Detroit	7–11	12–6	9–9	9–9	—	13–5	10–8	8–10	10–8	11–7
Kansas City	7–11	7–11	5–13	9–9	5–13	—	5–13	8–10	7–11	6–12
Los Angeles / California	5–13	13–5	6–12	9–9	8–10	13–5	—	9–9	6–12	6–12
Minnesota	10–8	17–1	11–7	7–11	10–8	10–8	9–9	—	13–5	15–3
New York	5–13	9–9	10–8	6–12	8–10	11–7	12–6	5–13	—	11–7
Washington	10–8	7–11	5–13	7–11	7–11	12–6	12–6	3–15	7–11	—

NOTE: The Los Angeles Angels changed their name to California Angels on September 2, 1965, with the season in progress.

=== Notable transactions ===
- May 3, 1965: Joe Rudi was selected off waivers from the Athletics by the Cleveland Indians as a first-year waiver pick.
- May 3, 1965: Doc Edwards was traded by the Athletics to the New York Yankees for Johnny Blanchard and Rollie Sheldon.
- May 28, 1965: Don Mossi was signed as a free agent by the Athletics.
- June 8, 1965: 1965 Major League Baseball draft notable picks:

Round 1: Rick Monday (1st pick). Player signed June 15, 1965.
Round 2: Joe Keough
Round 3: Bob Stinson (did not sign)
Round 4: Pete Koegel
Round 6: Sal Bando
Round 7: Scott Reid (did not sign)
Round 10: George Lauzerique
Round 15: Bobby Brooks
Round 20: Gene Tenace
Round 28: Greg Garrett (did not sign)

- September 10, 1965: Satchel Paige was signed as a free agent by the Athletics.

=== Roster ===
1965 Kansas City Athletics
Roster
Pitchers: 23 Jack Aker; 20 Don Buschhorn; 22 Jim Dickson; 25 Moe Drabowsky; 23,35 Tom Harrison; 23 Jesse Hickman; 27 Catfish Hunter; 34 Dick Joyce; 25 Lew Krausse Jr.; 32 Paul Lindblad; 14 Aurelio Monteagudo; 43 Don Mossi; 26 John O'Donoghue; 13 Blue Moon Odom; 29 Satchel Paige; 24 Orlando Peña; 29 José Santiago; 17 Diego Seguí; 15 Rollie Sheldon; 18 Wes Stock; 28 Fred Talbot; 46 Ron Tompkins; 33 John Wyatt	Catchers: 9 Billy Bryan; 10 Doc Edwards; 37,11 Rene Lachemann; Infielders: 19 Bert Campaneris; 2 Wayne Causey; 16 Ed Charles; 6 Jim Gentile; 1 Dick Green; 4,6 Ken Harrelson; 8 Skip Lockwood; 21 Santiago Rosario; 21 Randy Schwartz	Outfielders: 14 Johnny Blanchard; 37 Lou Clinton; 3 Mike Hershberger; 7 Jim Landis; 5 Nelson Mathews; 12 Tommie Reynolds; 24 Larry Stahl; 10 José Tartabull; Other batters: 15,36 John Sanders	Manager: 41 Mel McGaha; 41 Haywood Sullivan; Coaches: 44 Luke Appling; 49 Tom Ferrick; 42 Gabby Hartnett; 40 Whitey Herzog

== Player stats ==
=== Batting ===
==== Starters by position ====
Note: Pos = Position; G = Games played; AB = At bats; H = Hits; Avg. = Batting average; HR = Home runs; RBI = Runs batted in

Pos	Player	G	AB	H	Avg.	HR	RBI
C	Billy Bryan	108	325	82	.252	14	51
1B	Ken Harrelson	150	483	115	.238	23	66
2B	Dick Green	133	474	110	.232	15	55
SS	Bert Campaneris	144	578	156	.270	6	42
3B	Ed Charles	134	480	129	.269	8	56
LF	Tommie Reynolds	90	270	64	.237	1	22
CF	Jim Landis	118	364	87	.239	3	36
RF	Mike Hershberger	150	494	114	.231	5	48

==== Other batters ====
Note: G = Games played; AB = At bats; H = Hits; Avg. = Batting average; HR = Home runs; RBI = Runs batted in

Player	G	AB	H	Avg.	HR	RBI
Wayne Causey	144	513	134	.261	3	34
José Tartabull	68	218	68	.312	1	19
Rene Lachemann	92	216	49	.227	9	29
Nelson Mathews	67	184	39	.212	2	15
Johnny Blanchard	52	120	24	.200	2	11
Jim Gentile	38	118	29	.246	10	22
Santiago Rosario	81	85	20	.235	2	8
Larry Stahl	28	81	16	.198	4	14
Skip Lockwood	42	33	4	.121	0	0
Doc Edwards	6	20	3	.150	0	0
Randy Schwartz	6	7	2	.286	0	1
Lou Clinton	1	1	0	.000	0	0
John Sanders	1	0	0	----	0	0

=== Pitching ===
==== Starting pitchers ====
Note: G = Games pitched; IP = Innings pitched; W = Wins; L = Losses; ERA = Earned run average; SO = Strikeouts

Player	G	IP	W	L	ERA	SO
Fred Talbot	39	198.0	10	12	4.14	117
Rollie Sheldon	32	186.2	10	8	3.95	105
John O'Donoghue	34	177.2	9	18	3.95	82
Satchel Paige	1	3.0	0	0	0.00	1

==== Other pitchers ====
Note: G = Games pitched; IP = Innings pitched; W = Wins; L = Losses; ERA = Earned run average; SO = Strikeouts

Player	G	IP	W	L	ERA	SO
Diego Seguí	40	163.0	5	15	4.64	119
Catfish Hunter	32	133.0	8	8	4.26	83
Moe Drabowsky	14	38.2	1	5	4.42	25
Orlando Peña	12	35.1	0	6	6.88	24
Don Buschhorn	12	31.0	0	1	4.35	9
Lew Krausse Jr.	7	25.0	2	4	5.04	22
Dick Joyce	5	13.0	0	1	2.77	7
Ron Tompkins	5	10.1	0	0	3.48	4

==== Relief pitchers ====
Note: G = Games pitched; W = Wins; L = Losses; SV = Saves; ERA = Earned run average; SO = Strikeouts

Player	G	W	L	SV	ERA	SO
John Wyatt	65	2	6	18	3.25	70
Jim Dickson	68	3	2	0	3.47	54
Wes Stock	62	0	4	4	5.24	52
Don Mossi	51	5	8	7	3.74	41
Jack Aker	34	4	3	3	3.16	26
Jesse Hickman	12	0	1	0	5.87	16
Paul Lindblad	4	0	1	0	11.05	12
Aurelio Monteagudo	4	0	0	0	3.86	5
José Santiago	4	0	0	0	9.00	8
Blue Moon Odom	1	0	0	0	9.00	0
Tom Harrison	1	0	0	0	9.00	0
Bert Campaneris	1	0	0	0	9.00	1

== Farm system ==
Level	Team	League	Manager
AAA	Vancouver Mounties	Pacific Coast League	Haywood Sullivan and Bobby Hofman
AA	Birmingham Barons	Southern League	John McNamara
A	Leesburg Athletics	Florida State League	Tony Frulio
A	Burlington Bees	Midwest League	Gus Niarhos
A	Shelby Rebels	Western Carolinas League	Wes Ferrell and Jimmy Williams
Short-Season A	Lewiston Broncos	Northwest League	Bobby Hofman, Bill Posedel and Al Ronning

LEAGUE CHAMPIONS: Burlington
