= 1965 Washington Senators season =

1965 Washington Senators
- League: American League
- Ballpark: D.C. Stadium
- City: Washington, D.C.
- Record: 70–92 (.432)
- League place: 8th
- Owners: James M. Johnston and James H. Lemon
- General managers: George Selkirk
- Managers: Gil Hodges
- Television: WTOP
- Radio: WTOP (Dan Daniels, John MacLean)

The 1965 Washington Senators season involved the Senators finishing eighth in the American League with a record of 70 wins and 92 losses.

== Offseason ==
- November 30, 1964: Tim Cullen was drafted by the Senators from the Boston Red Sox in the 1964 first-year draft.
- December 1, 1964: Chuck Hinton was traded by the Senators to the Cleveland Indians for Woodie Held and Bob Chance.
- December 4, 1964: Claude Osteen, John Kennedy and $100,000 were traded by the Senators to the Los Angeles Dodgers for Frank Howard, Ken McMullen, Phil Ortega, Pete Richert and a player to be named later. The Dodgers completed the deal by sending Dick Nen to the Senators on December 15.

== Regular season ==
=== Season standings ===
American League
Team	W	L	Pct.	GB	Home	Road
Minnesota Twins	102	60	.630	—	51‍–‍30	51‍–‍30
Chicago White Sox	95	67	.586	7	48‍–‍33	47‍–‍34
Baltimore Orioles	94	68	.580	8	46‍–‍33	48‍–‍35
Detroit Tigers	89	73	.549	13	47‍–‍34	42‍–‍39
Cleveland Indians	87	75	.537	15	52‍–‍30	35‍–‍45
New York Yankees	77	85	.475	25	40‍–‍43	37‍–‍42
Los Angeles / California Angels	75	87	.463	27	46‍–‍34	29‍–‍53
Washington Senators	70	92	.432	32	36‍–‍45	34‍–‍47
Boston Red Sox	62	100	.383	40	34‍–‍47	28‍–‍53
Kansas City Athletics	59	103	.364	43	33‍–‍48	26‍–‍55

=== Record vs. opponents ===
1965 American League record Sources:
Team	BAL	BOS	CWS	CLE	DET	KCA	LAA	MIN	NYY	WAS
Baltimore	—	11–7	9–9	10–8	11–7	11–7	13–5	8–10	13–5	8–10
Boston	7–11	—	4–14	8–10	6–12	11–7	5–13	1–17	9–9	11–7
Chicago	9–9	14–4	—	10–8	9–9	13–5	12–6	7–11	8–10	13–5
Cleveland	8–10	10–8	8–10	—	9–9	9–9	9–9	11–7	12–6	11–7
Detroit	7–11	12–6	9–9	9–9	—	13–5	10–8	8–10	10–8	11–7
Kansas City	7–11	7–11	5–13	9–9	5–13	—	5–13	8–10	7–11	6–12
Los Angeles / California	5–13	13–5	6–12	9–9	8–10	13–5	—	9–9	6–12	6–12
Minnesota	10–8	17–1	11–7	7–11	10–8	10–8	9–9	—	13–5	15–3
New York	5–13	9–9	10–8	6–12	8–10	11–7	12–6	5–13	—	11–7
Washington	10–8	7–11	5–13	7–11	7–11	12–6	12–6	3–15	7–11	—

NOTE: The Los Angeles Angels changed their name to California Angels on September 2, 1965, with the season in progress.

=== Notable transactions ===
- June 8, 1965: Joe Coleman was drafted by the Senators in the 1st round (3rd pick) of the 1965 Major League Baseball draft.
- June 8, 1965: Tom Ragland was drafted by the Washington Senators in the 15th round of the 1965 amateur draft.

=== Roster ===
1965 Washington Senators
Roster
Pitchers: 22 Marshall Bridges; 36 Joe Coleman; 35 Pete Craig; 21 Bennie Daniels; 17 Jim Duckworth; 17 Ryne Duren; 35 Dallas Green; 19 Jim Hannan; 27 Ron Kline; 31 Howie Koplitz; 18 Frank Kreutzer; 16 Mike McCormick; 17 Barry Moore; 20 Buster Narum; 26 Phil Ortega; 24 Pete Richert; 28 Steve Ridzik; 22 Nick Willhite	Catchers: 8 Mike Brumley; 29 Doug Camilli; 32 Paul Casanova; 37 Jim French; 31 Joe McCabe; 23 Don Zimmer; Infielders: 25 Brant Alyea; 1 Don Blasingame; 11 Ed Brinkman; 10 Bob Chance; 3 Joe Cunningham; 7 Ken Hamlin; 2 Ken McMullen; 5 Dick Nen; 25 Roy Sievers	Outfielders: 12 Woodie Held; 9 Frank Howard; 30 Jim King; 6 Willie Kirkland; 4 Don Lock; 34 Fred Valentine; Other batters: 7 Chuck Cottier	Manager: 14 Gil Hodges; Coaches: 40 Sid Hudson; 44 Joe Pignatano; 43 George Susce; 41 Rube Walker; 42 Eddie Yost

== Player stats ==
= Indicates team leader

=== Batting ===
==== Starters by position ====
Note: Pos = Position; G = Games played; AB = At bats; H = Hits; Avg. = Batting average; HR = Home runs; RBI = Runs batted in

Pos	Player	G	AB	H	Avg.	HR	RBI
C	Mike Brumley	79	216	45	.208	3	15
1B	Dick Nen	69	246	64	.260	6	31
2B	Don Blasingame	129	403	90	.223	1	18
SS	Ed Brinkman	154	444	82	.185	5	35
3B	Ken McMullen	150	555	146	.263	18	54
LF	Frank Howard	149	516	149	.289	21	84
CF	Don Lock	143	418	90	.215	16	39
RF	Jim King	120	258	55	.213	14	49

==== Other batters ====
Note: G = Games played; AB = At bats; H = Hits; Avg. = Batting average; HR = Home runs; RBI = Runs batted in

Player	G	AB	H	Avg.	HR	RBI
Ken Hamlin	117	362	99	.273	4	22
Woodie Held	122	332	82	.247	16	54
Willie Kirkland	123	312	72	.231	14	54
Don Zimmer	95	226	45	.199	2	17
Joe Cunningham	95	201	46	.229	3	20
Bob Chance	72	199	51	.256	4	14
Doug Camilli	75	193	37	.192	3	18
Jim French	13	37	11	.297	1	7
Fred Valentine	12	29	7	.241	0	1
Joe McCabe	14	27	5	.185	1	5
Roy Sievers	12	21	4	.190	0	0
Paul Casanova	5	13	4	.308	0	1
Brant Alyea	8	13	3	.231	2	6
Chuck Cottier	7	1	0	.000	0	0

=== Pitching ===
==== Starting pitchers ====
Note: G = Games pitched; IP = Innings pitched; W = Wins; L = Losses; ERA = Earned run average; SO = Strikeouts

Player	G	IP	W	L	ERA	SO
Pete Richert	34	194.0	15	12	2.60	161
Phil Ortega	35	179.2	12	15	5.11	88
Joe Coleman	2	18.0	2	0	1.50	7
Pete Craig	3	14.1	0	3	8.16	2

==== Other pitchers ====
Note: G = Games pitched; IP = Innings pitched; W = Wins; L = Losses; ERA = Earned run average; SO = Strikeouts

Player	G	IP	W	L	ERA	SO
Buster Narum	46	173.2	4	12	4.46	86
Mike McCormick	44	158.0	8	8	3.36	88
Bennie Daniels	33	116.1	5	13	4.72	42
Howie Koplitz	33	106.2	4	7	4.05	59
Frank Kreutzer	33	85.1	2	6	4.32	65
Jim Duckworth	17	64.0	2	2	3.94	74
Jim Hannan	4	14.2	1	1	4.91	5
Dallas Green	6	14.1	0	0	3.14	6

==== Relief pitchers ====
Note: G = Games pitched; W = Wins; L = Losses; SV = Saves; ERA = Earned run average; SO = Strikeouts

Player	G	W	L	SV	ERA	SO
Ron Kline	74	7	6	29	2.63	52
Steve Ridzik	63	6	4	8	4.02	72
Marshall Bridges	40	1	2	0	2.67	39
Ryne Duren	16	1	1	0	6.65	18
Nick Willhite	5	0	0	0	7.11	3
Barry Moore	1	0	0	0	0.00	0

== Farm system ==
Level	Team	League	Manager
AAA	Hawaii Islanders	Pacific Coast League	George Case
AA	York White Roses	Eastern League	Billy Klaus
A	Burlington Senators	Carolina League	Owen Friend
A	Geneva Senators	New York–Penn League	Wayne Terwilliger
Rookie	Wytheville Senators	Appalachian League	Lee Anthony
