= 1965 Boston Red Sox season =

Major League Baseball season

1965 Boston Red Sox
- League: American League
- Ballpark: Fenway Park
- City: Boston, Massachusetts
- Record: 62–100 (.383)
- League place: 9th
- Owners: Tom Yawkey
- President: Tom Yawkey
- General managers: Pinky Higgins, Dick O'Connell
- Managers: Billy Herman
- Television: WHDH-TV, Ch. 5
- Radio: WHDH-AM 850 (Curt Gowdy, Ned Martin, Mel Parnell)
- Stats: ESPN.com; Baseball Reference

The 1965 Boston Red Sox season was the 65th season in the franchise's Major League Baseball history. The Red Sox, with Billy Herman at the helm, finished ninth in the American League (AL) with a record of 62 wins and 100 losses (this is, to date, the most recent season the team has lost 100+ games in a season), 40 games behind the AL champion Minnesota Twins, against whom the 1965 Red Sox lost 17 of 18 games. The team drew only 652,201 fans to Fenway Park, seventh in the ten-team league but the Red Sox' lowest turnstile count since 1945, the last year of World War II. The final home game had 487 fans.

One of the team's few bright spots was that 20-year old Tony Conigliaro led the AL with 32 home runs, becoming the youngest home run champion in AL history.

On September 16, 1965, at Fenway Park, third-year right-hander Dave Morehead, 22, threw the club's first no-hitter since August 1, 1962, and 13th in its history, when he defeated the Cleveland Indians (and Luis Tiant), 2–0. Morehead, only 10–16 on the season after today, fanned eight and permitted only one baserunner, Rocky Colavito, who drew a base on balls in the second inning.

From a long-term viewpoint, September 16 was also consequential when, prior to the game, owner Tom Yawkey dismissed longtime confidant Pinky Higgins as executive vice president and general manager. Higgins, 56, had been associated with the Red Sox continuously since May 1946, as a third baseman, minor- and major-league field manager, and front-office executive. His successor, fellow senior executive Dick O'Connell, 51, the club's business manager, will supervise the team's successful rebuilding and win two AL pennants (1967, 1975) and two The Sporting News Executive of the Year Awards during his dozen years as general manager.

== Offseason ==
- October 14, 1964: The Red Sox release veteran outfielders Al Smith, 36, and Dick Williams, 35. They will later name Williams the 1965 manager of their new Triple-A affiliate, the Toronto Maple Leafs of the International League.
- November 29, 1964: The Red Sox trade first baseman Dick Stuart, 32, to the Philadelphia Phillies for left-handed pitcher Dennis Bennett, 25.
- November 30, 1964: In the first-year draft, the Red Sox select, among others, southpaw Sparky Lyle, 20, from the Baltimore Orioles, and lose infielder Tim Cullen, 22, to the Washington Senators. In the minor league draft, the Red Sox select right-hander Gary Waslewski, 23, from the Pittsburgh Pirates.

== Regular season ==
=== Season standings ===
American League
Team	W	L	Pct.	GB	Home	Road
Minnesota Twins	102	60	.630	—	51‍–‍30	51‍–‍30
Chicago White Sox	95	67	.586	7	48‍–‍33	47‍–‍34
Baltimore Orioles	94	68	.580	8	46‍–‍33	48‍–‍35
Detroit Tigers	89	73	.549	13	47‍–‍34	42‍–‍39
Cleveland Indians	87	75	.537	15	52‍–‍30	35‍–‍45
New York Yankees	77	85	.475	25	40‍–‍43	37‍–‍42
Los Angeles / California Angels	75	87	.463	27	46‍–‍34	29‍–‍53
Washington Senators	70	92	.432	32	36‍–‍45	34‍–‍47
Boston Red Sox	62	100	.383	40	34‍–‍47	28‍–‍53
Kansas City Athletics	59	103	.364	43	33‍–‍48	26‍–‍55

=== Record vs. opponents ===
1965 American League record Sources:
Team	BAL	BOS	CWS	CLE	DET	KCA	LAA	MIN	NYY	WAS
Baltimore	—	11–7	9–9	10–8	11–7	11–7	13–5	8–10	13–5	8–10
Boston	7–11	—	4–14	8–10	6–12	11–7	5–13	1–17	9–9	11–7
Chicago	9–9	14–4	—	10–8	9–9	13–5	12–6	7–11	8–10	13–5
Cleveland	8–10	10–8	8–10	—	9–9	9–9	9–9	11–7	12–6	11–7
Detroit	7–11	12–6	9–9	9–9	—	13–5	10–8	8–10	10–8	11–7
Kansas City	7–11	7–11	5–13	9–9	5–13	—	5–13	8–10	7–11	6–12
Los Angeles / California	5–13	13–5	6–12	9–9	8–10	13–5	—	9–9	6–12	6–12
Minnesota	10–8	17–1	11–7	7–11	10–8	10–8	9–9	—	13–5	15–3
New York	5–13	9–9	10–8	6–12	8–10	11–7	12–6	5–13	—	11–7
Washington	10–8	7–11	5–13	7–11	7–11	12–6	12–6	3–15	7–11	—

NOTE: The Los Angeles Angels changed their name to California Angels on September 2, 1965, with the season in progress.

=== Notable transactions ===
- March 30, 1965: The Red Sox purchase the contract of nine-year veteran centerfielder Lenny Green, 32, from the Baltimore Orioles.
- June 8, 1965: In the first-of-its-kind 1965 Major League Baseball draft, the Red Sox select outfielder Billy Conigliaro, 17-year-old brother of their star sophomore right fielder, from Swampscott High School in the Boston suburb, as their first-round selection (fifth overall). They also pick Amos Otis, 18, then a shortstop, in the fifth round (95th overall).
- September 14, 1965: The Red Sox trade veteran relief pitcher Jack Lamabe, 29, to the Houston Astros for pitcher Bucky Brandon, 25, then a minor-leaguer.

=== Opening Day lineup ===
38	Rico Petrocelli	SS
7	Lenny Green	CF
8	Carl Yastrzemski	LF
25	Tony Conigliaro	RF
6	Lee Thomas	1B
12	Félix Mantilla	2B
11	Frank Malzone	3B
10	Bob Tillman	C
27	Bill Monbouquette	P

=== Roster ===
1965 Boston Red Sox
Roster
Pitchers: 28 Dennis Bennett; 14 Bob Duliba; 21 Arnold Earley; 20 Bob Heffner; 36 Jack Lamabe; 16 Jim Lonborg; 27 Bill Monbouquette; 23 Dave Morehead; 17 Dick Radatz; 19 Jay Ritchie; 18 Jerry Stephenson; 26 Earl Wilson	Catchers: 5 Russ Nixon; 40 Mike Ryan; 10 Bob Tillman; Infielders: 1 Ed Bressoud; 30 Tony Horton; 39 Dalton Jones; 11 Frank Malzone; 12 Félix Mantilla; 38 Rico Petrocelli; 2 Chuck Schilling; 6 Lee Thomas	Outfielders: 25 Tony Conigliaro; 3 Gary Geiger; 4 Jim Gosger; 7 Lenny Green; 8 Carl Yastrzemski; Other batters: 41 Jerry Moses; 4 Rudy Schlesinger	Manager: 35 Billy Herman; Coaches: 33 Mace Brown (Pitching); 31 Billy Gardner (Third base); 34 Len Okrie (Bullpen); 32 Pete Runnels (First base)

== Player stats ==
= Indicates team leader

=== Batting ===
==== Starters by position ====
Note: Pos = Position; G = Games played; AB = At bats; H = Hits; Avg. = Batting average; HR = Home runs; RBI = Runs batted in

Pos	Player	G	AB	H	Avg.	HR	RBI
C	Bob Tillman	111	368	79	.215	6	35
1B	Lee Thomas	151	521	141	.271	22	75
2B	Félix Mantilla	150	534	147	.275	18	92
3B	Frank Malzone	106	364	87	.239	3	34
SS	Rico Petrocelli	103	323	75	.232	13	33
LF	Carl Yastrzemski	133	494	154	.312	20	72
CF	Lenny Green	119	373	103	.276	7	24
RF	Tony Conigliaro	138	521	140	.269	32	82

==== Other batters ====
Note: G = Games played; AB = At bats; H = Hits; Avg. = Batting average; HR = Home runs; RBI = Runs batted in

Player	G	AB	H	Avg.	HR	RBI
Dalton Jones	112	367	99	.270	5	37
Jim Gosger	81	324	83	.256	9	35
Ed Bressoud	107	296	67	.226	8	25
Chuck Schilling	71	171	41	.240	3	9
Tony Horton	60	163	48	.294	7	23
Russ Nixon	59	137	37	.270	0	11
Mike Ryan	33	107	17	.159	3	9
Gary Geiger	24	45	9	.200	1	2
Jerry Moses	4	4	1	.250	1	1
Bill Schlesinger	1	1	0	.000	0	0

=== Pitching ===
==== Starting pitchers ====
Note: G = Games pitched; IP = Innings pitched; W = Wins; L = Losses; ERA = Earned run average; SO = Strikeouts

Player	G	IP	W	L	ERA	SO
Earl Wilson	36	230.0	13	14	3.98	164
Bill Monbouquette	35	228.2	10	18	3.70	110
Dave Morehead	34	192.2	10	18	4.06	163
Jim Lonborg	32	185.1	9	17	4.47	113

==== Other pitchers ====
Note: G = Games pitched; IP = Innings pitched; W = Wins; L = Losses; ERA = Earned run average; SO = Strikeouts

Player	G	IP	W	L	ERA	SO
Dennis Bennett	34	141.2	5	7	4.38	85
Jerry Stephenson	15	52.0	1	5	6.23	49

==== Relief pitchers ====
Note: G = Games pitched; W = Wins; L = Losses; SV = Saves; ERA = Earned run average; SO = Strikeouts

Player	G	W	L	SV	ERA	SO
Dick Radatz	63	9	11	22	3.91	121
Arnold Earley	57	0	1	0	3.63	47
Jay Ritchie	44	1	2	2	3.17	55
Bob Duliba	39	4	2	1	3.78	27
Bob Heffner	27	0	2	0	7.16	42
Jack Lamabe	14	0	3	0	8.17	17

== Awards and honors ==
- Carl Yastrzemski, Gold Glove Award (OF)

== Farm system ==
Level	Team	League	Manager
AAA	Toronto Maple Leafs	International League	Dick Williams
AA	Pittsfield Red Sox	Eastern League	Eddie Popowski
A	Winston-Salem Red Sox	Carolina League	Bill Slack
A	Waterloo Hawks	Midwest League	Larry Lee Thomas
A	Wellsville Red Sox	New York–Penn League	Matt Sczesny
Rookie	Harlan Red Sox	Appalachian League	Rac Slider

LEAGUE CHAMPIONS: Toronto, Pittsfield
