= 1965 Detroit Tigers season =

Major League Baseball season

1965 Detroit Tigers
- League: American League
- Ballpark: Tiger Stadium
- City: Detroit, Michigan
- Record: 89–73 (.549)
- League place: 4th
- Owners: John Fetzer
- General managers: Jim Campbell
- Managers: Chuck Dressen, Bob Swift
- Television: WJBK (George Kell, Ray Lane)
- Radio: WJR (Ernie Harwell, Gene Osborn)

The 1965 Detroit Tigers season was the team's 65th season and the 54th season at Tiger Stadium. The team finished fourth in the American League with a record of 89–73, 13 games behind the Minnesota Twins.

== Offseason ==
- Prior to 1965 season: George Korince was signed as an amateur free agent by the Tigers.

== Regular season ==
=== Season standings ===
American League
Team	W	L	Pct.	GB	Home	Road
Minnesota Twins	102	60	.630	—	51‍–‍30	51‍–‍30
Chicago White Sox	95	67	.586	7	48‍–‍33	47‍–‍34
Baltimore Orioles	94	68	.580	8	46‍–‍33	48‍–‍35
Detroit Tigers	89	73	.549	13	47‍–‍34	42‍–‍39
Cleveland Indians	87	75	.537	15	52‍–‍30	35‍–‍45
New York Yankees	77	85	.475	25	40‍–‍43	37‍–‍42
Los Angeles / California Angels	75	87	.463	27	46‍–‍34	29‍–‍53
Washington Senators	70	92	.432	32	36‍–‍45	34‍–‍47
Boston Red Sox	62	100	.383	40	34‍–‍47	28‍–‍53
Kansas City Athletics	59	103	.364	43	33‍–‍48	26‍–‍55

=== Record vs. opponents ===
1965 American League record Sources:
Team	BAL	BOS	CWS	CLE	DET	KCA	LAA	MIN	NYY	WAS
Baltimore	—	11–7	9–9	10–8	11–7	11–7	13–5	8–10	13–5	8–10
Boston	7–11	—	4–14	8–10	6–12	11–7	5–13	1–17	9–9	11–7
Chicago	9–9	14–4	—	10–8	9–9	13–5	12–6	7–11	8–10	13–5
Cleveland	8–10	10–8	8–10	—	9–9	9–9	9–9	11–7	12–6	11–7
Detroit	7–11	12–6	9–9	9–9	—	13–5	10–8	8–10	10–8	11–7
Kansas City	7–11	7–11	5–13	9–9	5–13	—	5–13	8–10	7–11	6–12
Los Angeles / California	5–13	13–5	6–12	9–9	8–10	13–5	—	9–9	6–12	6–12
Minnesota	10–8	17–1	11–7	7–11	10–8	10–8	9–9	—	13–5	15–3
New York	5–13	9–9	10–8	6–12	8–10	11–7	12–6	5–13	—	11–7
Washington	10–8	7–11	5–13	7–11	7–11	12–6	12–6	3–15	7–11	—

NOTE: The Los Angeles Angels changed their name to California Angels on September 2, 1965, with the season in progress.

=== Roster ===
1965 Detroit Tigers
Roster
Pitchers: 37 Hank Aguirre; 18 Terry Fox; 20 Fred Gladding; 31 Jack Hamilton; 39 John Hiller; 19 Vern Holtgrave; 29 Mickey Lolich; 46 Leo Marentette; 17 Denny McLain; 42 Julio Navarro; 27,32 Ron Nischwitz; 24,28 Orlando Peña; 19 Ed Rakow; 16 Phil Regan; 39 Johnnie Seale; 15 Larry Sherry; 21 Joe Sparma; 14 Dave Wickersham	Catchers: 11 Bill Freehan; 35 Jackie Moore; 36 John Sullivan; Infielders: 25 Norm Cash; 9 Jerry Lumpe; 3 Dick McAuliffe; 1 Ray Oyler; 37 Bill Roman; 40 George Smith; 8 Don Wert; 2 Jake Wood	Outfielders: 26 Gates Brown; 4 Don Demeter; 23 Willie Horton; 6 Al Kaline; 30 Jim Northrup; 32 Wayne Redmond; 49 Mickey Stanley; 24 George Thomas	Manager: 7 Chuck Dressen; 51 Bob Swift; Coaches: 52 Pat Mullin; 53 Stubby Overmire; 12 Mike Roarke; 55 Frank Skaff; 51 Bob Swift

== Player stats ==
=== Batting ===
==== Starters by position ====
Note: Pos = Position; G = Games played; AB = At bats; H = Hits; Avg. = Batting average; HR = Home runs; RBI = Runs batted in

Pos	Player	G	AB	H	Avg.	HR	RBI
C	Bill Freehan	130	431	101	.234	10	43
1B	Norm Cash	142	467	124	.266	30	82
2B	Jerry Lumpe	145	502	129	.257	4	39
3B	Don Wert	162	609	159	.261	12	54
SS	Dick McAuliffe	113	404	105	.260	15	54
LF	Willie Horton	143	512	140	.273	29	104
CF	Al Kaline	125	399	112	.281	18	72
RF	Jim Northrup	80	219	45	.205	2	16

==== Other batters ====
Note: G = Games played; AB = At bats; H = Hits; Avg. = Batting average; HR = Home runs; RBI = Runs batted in

Player	G	AB	H	Avg.	HR	RBI
Don Demeter	122	389	108	.278	16	58
Gates Brown	96	227	58	.256	10	43
Ray Oyler	82	194	36	.186	5	13
George Thomas	79	169	36	.213	3	10
Mickey Stanley	30	117	28	.239	3	13
Jake Wood	58	104	30	.288	2	7
John Sullivan	34	86	23	.267	2	11
Jackie Moore	21	53	5	.094	0	2
George Smith	32	53	5	.094	1	1
Bill Roman	21	27	2	.074	0	0
Wayne Redmond	4	4	0	.000	0	0

=== Pitching ===
==== Starting pitchers ====
Note: G = Games pitched; IP = Innings pitched; W = Wins; L = Losses; ERA = Earned run average; SO = Strikeouts

Player	G	IP	W	L	ERA	SO
Mickey Lolich	43	243.2	15	9	3.44	226
Denny McLain	33	220.1	16	6	2.61	192
Hank Aguirre	32	208.1	14	10	3.59	141
Dave Wickersham	34	195.1	9	14	3.78	109
Joe Sparma	30	167.0	13	8	3.18	127

==== Other pitchers ====
Note: G = Games pitched; IP = Innings pitched; W = Wins; L = Losses; ERA = Earned run average; SO = Strikeouts

Player	G	IP	W	L	ERA	SO
Phil Regan	16	51.2	1	5	5.05	37
Jack Hamilton	4	4.1	1	1	14.54	3

==== Relief pitchers ====
Note: G = Games pitched; W = Wins; L = Losses; SV = Saves; ERA = Earned run average; SO = Strikeouts

Player	G	W	L	SV	ERA	SO
Terry Fox	42	6	4	10	2.78	34
Fred Gladding	46	6	2	5	2.83	43
Larry Sherry	39	3	6	5	3.10	46
Orlando Peña	30	4	6	4	2.51	55
Ron Nischwitz	20	1	0	1	2.78	12
Julio Navarro	15	0	2	1	4.20	22
Ed Rakow	6	0	0	0	6.08	10
John Hiller	5	0	0	1	0.00	4
Johnnie Seale	4	0	0	0	12.00	3
Leo Marentette	2	0	0	0	0.00	3
Vern Holtgrave	1	0	0	0	6.00	2

== Farm system ==
Level	Team	League	Manager
AAA	Syracuse Chiefs	International League	Frank Carswell
AA	Montgomery Rebels	Southern League	Wayne Blackburn
A	Rocky Mount Leafs	Carolina League	Al Lakeman
A	Daytona Beach Islanders	Florida State League	Al Federoff
A	Jamestown Tigers	New York–Penn League	Gail Henley
A-Short Season	Duluth–Superior Dukes	Northern League	Doc Daugherty

Duluth-Superior affiliation shared with Chicago Cubs
