= Bill Schlesinger =

American baseball player (1941–2023)

- Pinch hitter
- Born: November 5, 1941; Cincinnati, Ohio, U.S.
- Died: August 13, 2023 (aged 81); Cincinnati, Ohio, U.S.
- Batted: Right Threw: Right

MLB debut
- May 4, 1965, for the Boston Red Sox

Last MLB appearance
- May 4, 1965, for the Boston Red Sox

MLB statistics
- Games played: 1
- At bats: 1
- Hits: 0
- Stats at Baseball Reference

Teams
- Boston Red Sox (1965)

William Cordes "Rudy" Schlesinger (November 5, 1941 – August 13, 2023) was an American professional baseball player who had only one at bat in Major League Baseball as a pinch hitter for the 1965 Boston Red Sox.

Listed at 6 feet 2 inches (1.88 m), 175 pounds (79 kg), Schlesinger batted and threw right-handed.

He spent much of his seven-year (1964–70) professional career in the Red Sox organization, although Boston would lose him on waivers once, trade him twice, and reacquire him twice in the space of four seasons.

== Early life ==
William Cordes Schlesinger was born in Cincinnati, Ohio on November 5, 1941. Growing up, he met many professional baseball players through his father Alvin, who ran a hardware store employing baseball players during their off-season.

== Career ==
An outfielder, Schlesinger was signed by Boston in 1963 out of the University of Cincinnati, where he graduated with a degree in education. After hitting 37 home runs, driving in 117 runs, and batting .341 for the Wellsville Red Sox in the 1964 Class A New York–Penn League, he made the 1965 Red Sox roster coming out of spring training. The bonus rule then in effect compelled the Red Sox to keep Schlesinger on their roster or risk losing him to another team.

In Schlesinger's only MLB appearance, on May 4, he batted for Boston pitcher Dave Morehead in the sixth inning against the Los Angeles Angels at Chavez Ravine. Schlesinger grounded out (pitcher Marcelino López to first baseman Costen Shockley). Boston lost the game, 7–1, one of 100 defeats the BoSox would absorb in 1965. Three days later, when the Red Sox tried to send Schlesinger to the minor leagues, they had to pass him through waivers and he was claimed by the Kansas City Athletics and dispatched to the Lewiston Broncs in Single-A.

After parts of two seasons in the Athletics' farm system, the Red Sox reacquired Schlesinger in 1966 where he then played the entire 1967 campaign with the Double-A Pittsfield Red Sox, belting 21 home runs. Then, during the winter meetings on November 30, 1967, he was traded with cash to the Chicago Cubs for pitcher Ray Culp. It was a one-sided deal: for the Red Sox, Culp averaged 16 wins over the next four seasons, while Schlesinger struggled in the Cubs system in 1968 before being reacquired by the Red Sox in midseason and returned to Pittsfield. He then began 1969 with Boston's Louisville Colonels affiliate. After only 50 at bats in Louisville, the parent Red Sox traded him again, this time to the Philadelphia Phillies for veteran outfielder Don Lock.

Schlesinger played the remainder of his pro career with the Phillies' Triple-A club, the Eugene Emeralds, in 1969–70. On August 20, 1970, Schlesinger was hit in the face by a pitch in a game in Tucson, lost 40% of his vision because of this injury, hit .190 for the rest of the season, and never made it back to the major leagues. All told, he batted .270 with 127 home runs in 732 minor league games.

== Later life and death ==
After retiring from baseball, Schlesinger worked for over 30 years in the family hardware business. He died in Cincinnati on August 13, 2023, at the age of 81.

== See also ==
- 1965 Boston Red Sox season
- Boston Red Sox all-time roster
- Cup of coffee
