= Ralph Gagliano =

American baseball player (born 1946)

- Shortstop
- Born: October 8, 1946 (age 79); Memphis, Tennessee
- Batted: Left Threw: Right

MLB debut
- September 21, 1965, for the Cleveland Indians

Last MLB appearance
- September 21, 1965, for the Cleveland Indians

MLB statistics
- Games played: 1
- Runs scored: 0
- Plate appearances: 0
- Stats at Baseball Reference

Teams
- Cleveland Indians (1965)

Ralph Michael Gagliano (born October 8, 1946) is an American former professional baseball player. An infielder by trade, he appeared in one Major League Baseball game for the Cleveland Indians on September 21, 1965, during which he recorded no at-bats. He has no "official" fielding position since he entered the game as a pinch-runner. He is the younger brother of Phil Gagliano.

Born in Memphis, Tennessee, he batted left-handed, threw right-handed, and was listed as 5 feet 11 inches (1.80 m) tall and 165 pounds (75 kg). Gagliano entered his only MLB game in the ninth inning of a 9–4 loss to Mel Stottlemyre and the New York Yankees at Yankee Stadium. With one out, Cleveland shortstop Larry Brown hit an infield single to third base and Gagliano pinch ran for him. The next batter, Richie Scheinblum, swung at the first pitch and grounded into a force play, second baseman Bobby Richardson to shortstop Bobby Murcer, and Gagliano was retired. Although that was the only game Gagliano appeared in at the Major League level, he played in 311 games over four years (1964, 1966, 1970–1971) in minor league baseball, mostly as a shortstop.

His career was interrupted by three years military service as a veteran of the Vietnam War. He was stationed at Fort Campbell for basic training and spent two years in Germany after being recruited by the United States Army Officer Candidate School.
