= Mel McGaha =

American basketball player and baseball manager

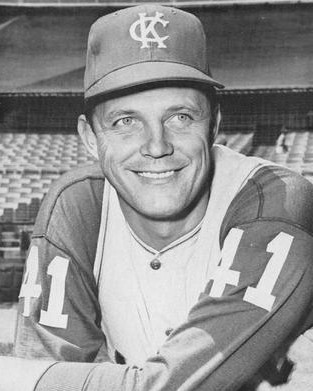

Personal information
- Born: September 26, 1926 Bastrop, Louisiana, U.S.
- Died: February 3, 2002 (aged 75) Tulsa, Oklahoma, U.S.
- Listed height: 6 ft 1 in (1.85 m)
- Listed weight: 190 lb (86 kg)

Career information
- High school: Mabelvale (Mablevale, Arkansas)
- College: Arkansas (1943–1947)
- NBA draft: 1948: -- round, --
- Drafted by: New York Knicks
- Playing career: 1948–1949
- Position: Point guard
- Number: 8

Career history

Playing
- 1948–1949: New York Knicks

Coaching
- 1953–1955: Arkansas–Monticello

Career BAA statistics
- Points: 176 (3.5 ppg)
- Assists: 51 (1.0 apg)
- Games played: 51
- Stats at NBA.com
- Stats at Basketball Reference

Fred Melvin McGaha (/məkˈɡeɪheɪ/ mək-GAY-hay; September 26, 1926 – February 3, 2002) was an American coach and manager in Major League Baseball as well as a professional basketball player. Born in Bastrop, Louisiana, he stood 6 feet 2 inches (1.88 m) tall and weighed 198 pounds (90 kg). McGaha graduated from the University of Arkansas and played a season of professional basketball with the New York Knicks of the NBA.

== Early life ==
McGaha was born on September 26, 1926, in Bastrop, Louisiana. He was raised by Fred and Ethie McGaha in Mabelvale, Arkansas, where he attended Mabelvale High School, and played basketball and baseball. He attended the University of Arkansas, where he played baseball, basketball and football. In the 1944–45 season, his basketball team competed in the NCAA tournament, however, he had entered the U.S. Army Air Corps in early 1945, and was not discharged until November of that year. He was a reserve on the Razorbacks football team that went to the 1947 Cotton Bowl (January 1, 1947).

He was a football team captain the following season in 1947. The team won the 1948 Dixie Bowl (January 1, 1948) over William & Mary, Arkansas' first bowl win. McGaha returned an interception seventy yards for a touchdown in the 21–19 victory.

After graduating in 1948, McGaha had opportunities to play professional football with the Los Angeles Rams, baseball in the St. Louis Cardinals organization, and basketball for the New York Knicks of the Basketball Association of American (BAA), a precursor to the National Basketball Association. He chose both baseball and basketball.

== Professional basketball ==
McGaha played 51 games for the New York Knicks of the BAA, for the 1948–49 season, under coach Joe Lapchick. He averaged 3.5 points, but his main role was as the team's "hatchetman". This was his only year playing professional basketball.

== Minor league baseball ==
McGaha played in the Cardinals' minor league system from 1948–1952. Playing at Class-C in 1948, his batting average was well over .300. That season, as a member of the 1948 Duluth Dukes, McGaha was one of the survivors of a July 24 bus crash in which four players and their manager were killed in a head-on accident with a truck. He suffered a separated shoulder and injured collarbone in the ordeal.

Recovered by 1949, McGaha advanced to the Triple-A Columbus Red Birds. In 114 games, he hit .290 and scored 70 runs, but only had one home run. The following season, he was demoted to Double-A, and never played at the Triple-A level again, or in the major leagues.

He played for the Double-A Shreveport Sports of the Texas League from 1953–1957. After 11 minor league seasons, at age 31, he retired after playing 33 games for the Mobile Bears in the Cleveland Indians' organization in 1958.

== Minor league manager ==
After McGaha realized he was not going to make the major leagues as a player, he began preparing himself for a managing career. In 1954, McGaha was named Shreveport's player–manager. At only 27, he led the Double-A Texas League Sports to 90 victories and a regular-season pennant in his first season, though they lost in the playoffs. He then led the Sports to 87 wins and a playoff title the following year. He would hold the job with Shreveport for two more years, though not as successfully.

When Cleveland hired him to join the Mobile Bears in 1958, it was likewise as player–manager. The team was 84–68 that year. After retiring as a player, he remained the Bears' manager in 1959, with the team record improving to 89–63, and winning the Southern Association championship. Cleveland promoted him in 1960 to manage the Triple-A Toronto Maple Leafs of the International League, he led the Leafs to a 100–54 record and the Governors' Cup playoff championship. McGaha was selected his league's Manager of the Year and The Sporting News Minor League Manager of the Year. His 1960 Toronto team included two future major league managers, Hall of Famer Sparky Anderson and Chuck Tanner.

== Manager of Indians and Athletics ==
In 1961, he was promoted to a coaching position with the parent Indians, then became their manager at age 35 in 1962, succeeding Jimmie Dykes. The team's early season performance gave some the thought he might be Manager of the Year. Cleveland was 48–37 at the All-Star break, tied with the New York Yankees for first place. But then, the team declined steeply (30–45 after the break). McGaha was told before the Indians' final two games that he would be fired, and he left the team immediately; the club finished at 78–82 in sixth place in the ten-team American League. He was particularly criticized for his handling of The Indians' pitching staff.

In 1963, McGaha became a coach and "executive consultant" for the Kansas City Athletics. In June 1964, owner Charlie Finley, known for his quick trigger finger in hiring and firing, abruptly shifted McGaha from his coaching job under manager Eddie Lopat to the skipper of the A's Wytheville rookie-level team in the Appalachian League; then, a few days later, the owner brought McGaha back to Kansas City as Lopat's successor.

Lopat's record was 17–35 when he was relieved of his managerial duties; the former New York Yankees' standout southpaw became a minor league consultant in the Athletics' organization. The 1964 A's revived somewhat under McGaha, going 40–70 under him, but still finished in last place. McGaha was brought back by Finley to manage his 1965 team, but after Kansas City dropped 21 of its first 26 games, McGaha was fired on May 15, 1965. His team was firmly locked in the league basement, 131/2 games out of the lead. He was replaced by Haywood Sullivan.

In part of three seasons as a major league manager, McGaha posted a 123–173 record (.416). Following his big-league managing career, he worked for the Houston Astros as pilot of the Triple-A Oklahoma City 89ers (1966–1967) and in the Venezuelan Winter League. He next became the Astro's first-base coach for three seasons (1968–1970).

=== Managerial record ===
Team	Year	Regular season					Postseason			
Team	Year	Games	Won	Lost	Win %	Finish	Won	Lost	Win %	Result
CLE	1962	160	78	82	.488	6th in AL	–	–	–	–
KCA	1964	110	40	70	.364	10th in AL	–	–	–	–
KCA	1965	26	5	21	.192	Fired	–	–	–	–
KCA total		135	45	91	.331		0	0	–	
Total		296	123	173	.416		0	0	–	

== Basketball coach ==
In addition to his baseball managing, McGaha also spent two years as the head men's basketball coach at Arkansas A&M College (now the University of Arkansas at Monticello), serving as the head coach in 1953-54 and 1954–55. He posted a 32–15 (.681) record during his two years as the Boll Weevils' head coach.

== Personal life and death ==
After retiring from major league baseball in 1970, he was a director of Parks and Recreation in Shreveport and Bossier City, Louisiana. He also became president of Shreveport’s Double-A minor league team; briefly worked as an executive for an El Paso minor league team; and scouted regionally for the Yankees. He was very involved in building a minor league baseball stadium in Shreveport in the 1980s.

McGaha moved to a retirement home in Grand Lake, Oklahoma, after suffering health issues. He died in Tulsa, Oklahoma, at age 75.

== BAA career statistics ==
Legend
GP	Games played
FG%	Field-goal percentage
FT%	Free-throw percentage
APG	Assists per game
PPG	Points per game

=== Regular season ===
Year	Team	GP	FG%	FT%	APG	PPG
1948–49	New York	51	.318	.591	1.0	3.5
Career		51	.318	.591	1.0	3.5

=== Playoffs ===
Year	Team	GP	FG%	FT%	APG	PPG
1949	New York	2	.000	.500	1.0	.5
Career		2	.000	.500	1.0	.5

Preceded by Mickey Livingston	Shreveport Sports manager 1954–1957	Succeeded by Les Peden (1959)
Preceded by Don Heffner	Mobile Bears manager 1958–1959	Succeeded by Al Hollingsworth
Preceded by Dixie Walker	Toronto Maple Leafs manager 1960	Succeeded by Johnny Lipon
Preceded by Grady Hatton	Oklahoma City 89ers manager 1966–1967	Succeeded by Cot Deal
Preceded by Nellie Fox	Houston Astros first base coach 1968–1970	Succeeded by Hub Kittle
