= Phil Ortega =

American baseball player (born 1939)

- Pitcher
- Born: October 7, 1939 (age 86); Gilbert, Arizona, U.S.
- Batted: Right Threw: Right

MLB debut
- September 10, 1960, for the Los Angeles Dodgers

Last MLB appearance
- May 4, 1969, for the California Angels

MLB statistics
- Win–loss record: 46–62
- Earned run average: 4.43
- Strikeouts: 549
- Stats at Baseball Reference

Teams
- Los Angeles Dodgers (1960–1964); Washington Senators (1965–1968); California Angels (1969)

Filomeno Coronado Ortega (born October 7, 1939) is an American former professional baseball pitcher who appeared in 204 games in Major League Baseball for the Los Angeles Dodgers, Washington Senators and California Angels over all or parts of ten seasons (1960–1969). A right-hander, he stood 6 feet 2 inches (1.88 m) tall and weighed 170 pounds (77 kg).

== Career ==
Ortega was born in Gilbert, Arizona and graduated from Mesa High School in 1959. Signed by the Dodgers in 1959 to a $75,000 bonus, the 18-year-old Ortega was immediately assigned to Triple-A Spokane, where he got into 22 games, 16 as a starting pitcher. He spent part of 1960 with Spokane, the bulk of the year with Class B Green Bay, and was called to the Dodgers in September for his first taste of MLB action. He had another late-season audition in 1961, then made the Dodger roster in 1962, appearing in 24 games with three starts for a contending team. Ortega was sent to Triple-A for one game in 1962, but in 1963, Ortega spent a full Pacific Coast League season with Spokane, and appeared in only one game with the Dodgers.

In 1964 he logged a full season in the majors, working in 34 games for Los Angeles and making 25 starts. He won seven of 16 decisions but showed promise with four complete games and three shutouts, including a three-hitter against the contending Cincinnati Reds on August 23. But the Dodgers slumped to the second division and, in search of pitching help, included Ortega in a blockbuster December 4, 1964, seven-player trade with the Washington Senators which saw Los Angeles obtain veteran left-hander Claude Osteen for slugger Frank Howard.

Managed by former Dodger teammate Gil Hodges, Ortega took a regular turn in the Senators' rotation, with 94 starting appearances over his first three seasons, including the 1965 "Presidential Opener". His best campaign came in 1967, when he set career highs in games started (34), innings pitched (2192/3), strikeouts (122) and earned run average (3.03). But his performance declined in 1968 with only five wins in 17 decisions and a poor 4.98 earned run average, and Ortega's contract was sold to the California Angels just prior to the 1969 season. The Angels used him in five games in relief during the campaign's early weeks, then sent him to the minors, where he pitched for the rest of his pro career, retiring in 1972.

During his ten-year MLB career, Ortega compiled 46 wins (against 62 defeats), 20 complete games, nine shutouts, 549 strikeouts, and a 4.43 earned run average. In 9512/3 innings pitched, he permitted 884 hits and 378 bases on balls.
