= 1965 Los Angeles / California Angels season =

Major League Baseball season

1965 Los Angeles / California Angels
- League: American League
- Ballpark: Chávez Ravine Stadium
- City: Los Angeles, California
- Record: 75–87 (.463)
- League place: 7th
- Owner: Gene Autry
- General manager: Fred Haney
- Manager: Bill Rigney
- Television: KTLA
- Radio: KMPC (Buddy Blattner, Don Wells, Steve Bailey)
- Stats: ESPN.com; Baseball Reference

The 1965 Los Angeles / California Angels season was the 5th season of the Angels franchise in the American League. The 1965 Angels finished seventh in the American League with a record of 75 wins and 87 losses, putting them 27 games behind the AL Champion Minnesota Twins. It was also the final season for the franchise in the city of Los Angeles before moving to their new stadium in nearby Anaheim for the following season. In their fourth and last year as tenants at Chávez Ravine Stadium, the Angels drew only 566,727 fans, eighth in the ten-team Junior Circuit and almost two million fans fewer than their landlords, the Dodgers, who were en route to the 1965 world championship.

== Midseason name change ==
Angels' logo after September 2

The 1965 Angels are the only team in 20th century Major League Baseball history to undergo an in-season name change. The club began the season under its original identity, the Los Angeles Angels, but with the imminent move to Anaheim, owner Gene Autry changed the name of the team to the California Angels — effective immediately — on September 2, 1965, with only 28 games left in the season.

The name change was reflected in the Angels' new caps, on which an interlocking "CA" in fancy block letters replaced the former interlocking "LA". The new caps retained the distinctive white halo around the navy-blue crown. Because the team's home and road uniforms of the time simply read "ANGELS" across the shirtfront, they did not change.

== Offseason ==
- October 14, 1964: The Angels traded a player to be named later to the Milwaukee Braves for Phil Roof and Ron Piché. The Angels completed the deal by sending Dan Osinski to the Braves on November 29.
- December 3, 1964: Bo Belinsky was traded by the Angels to the Philadelphia Phillies for Rudy May and Costen Shockley.
- Prior to 1965 season: Bob Smith was signed as a free agent by the Angels.

== Regular season ==
=== Season standings ===
American League
Team	W	L	Pct.	GB	Home	Road
Minnesota Twins	102	60	.630	—	51‍–‍30	51‍–‍30
Chicago White Sox	95	67	.586	7	48‍–‍33	47‍–‍34
Baltimore Orioles	94	68	.580	8	46‍–‍33	48‍–‍35
Detroit Tigers	89	73	.549	13	47‍–‍34	42‍–‍39
Cleveland Indians	87	75	.537	15	52‍–‍30	35‍–‍45
New York Yankees	77	85	.475	25	40‍–‍43	37‍–‍42
Los Angeles / California Angels	75	87	.463	27	46‍–‍34	29‍–‍53
Washington Senators	70	92	.432	32	36‍–‍45	34‍–‍47
Boston Red Sox	62	100	.383	40	34‍–‍47	28‍–‍53
Kansas City Athletics	59	103	.364	43	33‍–‍48	26‍–‍55

=== Record vs. opponents ===
1965 American League record Sources:
Team	BAL	BOS	CWS	CLE	DET	KCA	LAA	MIN	NYY	WAS
Baltimore	—	11–7	9–9	10–8	11–7	11–7	13–5	8–10	13–5	8–10
Boston	7–11	—	4–14	8–10	6–12	11–7	5–13	1–17	9–9	11–7
Chicago	9–9	14–4	—	10–8	9–9	13–5	12–6	7–11	8–10	13–5
Cleveland	8–10	10–8	8–10	—	9–9	9–9	9–9	11–7	12–6	11–7
Detroit	7–11	12–6	9–9	9–9	—	13–5	10–8	8–10	10–8	11–7
Kansas City	7–11	7–11	5–13	9–9	5–13	—	5–13	8–10	7–11	6–12
Los Angeles / California	5–13	13–5	6–12	9–9	8–10	13–5	—	9–9	6–12	6–12
Minnesota	10–8	17–1	11–7	7–11	10–8	10–8	9–9	—	13–5	15–3
New York	5–13	9–9	10–8	6–12	8–10	11–7	12–6	5–13	—	11–7
Washington	10–8	7–11	5–13	7–11	7–11	12–6	12–6	3–15	7–11	—

NOTE: The Los Angeles Angels changed their name to California Angels on September 2, 1965, with the season in progress.

=== Notable transactions ===
- May 13, 1965: Merritt Ranew was purchased by the Angels from the San Francisco Giants.
- June 8, 1965: Joe Henderson was drafted by the Angels in the 5th round of the 1965 Major League Baseball draft.
- June 15, 1965: Phil Roof was traded by the Angels to the Cleveland Indians for a player to be named later and cash. The Indians completed the deal by sending Bubba Morton to the Angels on September 15, 1965.

=== Roster ===
1965 Los Angeles / California Angels
Roster
Pitchers: 43 George Brunet; 31 Dean Chance; 46 Jim Coates; 38 Aubrey Gatewood; 34 Barry Latman; 39 Bob Lee; 48 Don Lee; 33 Marcelino López; 40 Rudy May; 37 Ken McBride; 41 Jim McGlothlin; 17 Fred Newman; 23 Ron Piché; 49 Jack Sanford; 23 Ed Sukla; 25 Dick Wantz	Catchers: 30 Tom Egan; 19 Merritt Ranew; 7 Buck Rodgers; 16 Phil Roof; Infielders: 6 Joe Adcock; 23 Charlie Dees; 11 Jim Fregosi; 44 Julio Gotay; 12 Jackie Hernández; 29 Bobby Knoop; 1 Joe Koppe; 14 Vic Power; 2 Tom Satriano; 42 Paul Schaal; 12 Costen Shockley	Outfielders: 27 José Cardenal; 24 Gino Cimoli; 15 Lou Clinton; 8 Ed Kirkpatrick; 28 Albie Pearson; 4 Jimmy Piersall; 20 Rick Reichardt; 10 Dick Simpson; 24 Bobby Gene Smith; 35 Willie Smith; 26 Al Spangler	Manager: 18 Bill Rigney; Coaches: 5 Marv Grissom; 3 Jack Paepke; 21 Salty Parker; 9 Del Rice

== Player stats ==
=== Batting ===
==== Starters by position ====
Note: Pos = Position; G = Games played; AB = At bats; H = Hits; Avg. = Batting average; HR = Home runs; RBI = Runs batted in

Pos	Player	G	AB	H	Avg.	HR	RBI
C	Buck Rodgers	132	411	86	.209	1	32
1B	Joe Adcock	122	349	84	.241	14	47
2B	Bobby Knoop	142	465	125	.269	7	43
SS	Jim Fregosi	161	602	167	.277	15	64
3B	Paul Schaal	155	483	108	.224	9	45
LF	Willie Smith	136	459	120	.261	14	57
CF	José Cardenal	134	512	128	.250	11	57
RF	Albie Pearson	122	360	100	.278	4	21

==== Other batters ====
Note: G = Games played; AB = At bats; H = Hits; Avg. = Batting average; HR = Home runs; RBI = Runs batted in

Player	G	AB	H	Avg.	HR	RBI
Lou Clinton	89	222	54	.243	1	8
Vic Power	124	197	51	.259	1	20
Jim Piersall	53	112	30	.268	2	12
Costen Shockley	40	107	20	.187	2	17
Al Spangler	51	96	25	.260	0	1
Merritt Ranew	41	91	19	.209	1	10
Tom Satriano	47	79	13	.165	1	4
Julio Gotay	40	77	19	.247	1	3
Rick Reichardt	20	75	20	.267	1	6
Ed Kirkpatrick	19	73	19	.260	3	8
Bob Smith	23	57	13	.228	0	5
Tom Egan	18	38	10	.263	0	1
Joe Koppe	23	33	7	.212	1	2
Charlie Dees	12	32	5	.156	0	1
Dick Simpson	8	27	6	.222	0	3
Phil Roof	9	22	3	.136	0	0
Jackie Hernández	6	6	2	.333	0	1
Gino Cimoli	4	5	0	.000	0	1

=== Pitching ===
==== Starting pitchers ====
Note: G = Games pitched; IP = Innings pitched; W = Wins; L = Losses; ERA = Earned run average; SO = Strikeouts

Player	G	IP	W	L	ERA	SO
Fred Newman	36	260.2	14	16	2.93	109
Dean Chance	36	225.2	15	10	3.15	164
Marcelino López	35	215.1	14	13	2.93	122
Jim McGlothlin	3	18.0	0	3	3.50	9

==== Other pitchers ====
Note: G = Games pitched; IP = Innings pitched; W = Wins; L = Losses; ERA = Earned run average; SO = Strikeouts

Player	G	IP	W	L	ERA	SO
George Brunet	41	197.0	9	11	2.56	141
Rudy May	30	124.0	4	9	3.92	76
Jack Sanford	9	29.1	1	2	4.60	13
Ken McBride	8	22.0	0	3	6.14	11

==== Relief pitchers ====
Note: G = Games pitched; W = Wins; L = Losses; SV = Saves; ERA = Earned run average; SO = Strikeouts

Player	G	W	L	SV	ERA	SO
Bob Lee	69	9	7	23	1.92	89
Aubrey Gatewood	46	4	5	0	3.42	37
Ed Sukla	25	2	3	3	4.50	15
Barry Latman	18	1	1	0	2.84	18
Jim Coates	17	2	0	3	3.54	15
Ron Piché	14	0	3	0	6.86	14
Don Lee	10	0	1	0	6.43	12
Dick Wantz	1	0	0	0	18.00	2

== Farm system ==
Level	Team	League	Manager
AAA	Seattle Angels	Pacific Coast League	Bob Lemon
AA	El Paso Sun Kings	Texas League	Chuck Tanner
A	San Jose Bees	California League	Rocky Bridges
A	Quad Cities Angels	Midwest League	Harry Dunlop and Ken Blackman
Rookie	Idaho Falls Angels	Pioneer League	Fred Koenig

Records
Preceded by 1964	Los Angeles / California Angels seasons 1965	Succeeded by 1966
