= Sandy Valdespino =

Cuban baseball player (1939–2023)

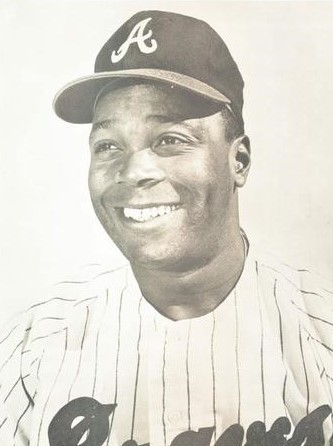
- Left fielder
- Born: January 14, 1939; San José de las Lajas, Cuba
- Died: February 26, 2023 (aged 84); Moultrie, Georgia, U.S.
- Batted: Left Threw: Left

MLB debut
- April 12, 1965, for the Minnesota Twins

Last MLB appearance
- September 28, 1971, for the Kansas City Royals

MLB statistics
- Batting average: .230
- Home runs: 7
- Runs batted in: 67
- Stats at Baseball Reference

Teams
- Minnesota Twins (1965–1967); Atlanta Braves (1968); Houston Astros (1969); Seattle Pilots/Milwaukee Brewers (1969–1970); Kansas City Royals (1971)

Hilario "Sandy" Valdespino Borroto (January 14, 1939 – February 26, 2023) was a Cuban-born corner outfielder in Major League Baseball who played for five different teams in the seven years from 1965 to 1971. Listed at 5 feet 8 inches (1.73 m) tall and 170 pounds (77 kg), Valdespino batted and threw left-handed.

== Baseball career ==
=== Minor leagues ===
Signed by fabled Washington Senators scout Joe Cambria in 1957, Valdespino had an extensive minor league career, appearing in more than 1,500 games over 16 seasons through 1974. He spent eight full years in the minor league system of the Senators and their post-1960 successor, the Minnesota Twins. He broke into the major leagues after winning the 1964 batting title of the Triple-A International League with a .337 mark as a member of the Atlanta Crackers.

=== 1965 Minnesota Twins ===
Valdespino was a 26-year-old rookie with the 1965 Twins, who won a team-record 102 games and the third American League pennant in the franchise's 65-year history. Valdespino spelled regular left fielder Bob Allison and right fielder Tony Oliva, starting 47 games and batting .261 and setting career bests in games played (108), plate appearances (274), at bats (245), runs scored (38), hits (64) and runs batted in (22). He then appeared in five of the seven games of the 1965 World Series, starting in left field in Games 1 and 4, pinch-hitting in three more, and collecting three hits in 11 at bats (.273). He hit a key double in the third inning of Game 1 off Don Drysdale of the Los Angeles Dodgers, part of the Twins' six-run uprising that sealed their 8–2, opening game victory. However, the Dodgers battled back to win the series in the seventh game behind Sandy Koufax.

=== Remainder of MLB career ===
After 1965, Valdespino would spend only one more full year—1967—in the major leagues, when he appeared in 99 games for the Twins, batting .165. He was selected by the Atlanta Braves in the Rule 5 draft that winter, and spent the remainder of his big-league career with abbreviated tenures with the Braves and three other teams. In 382 MLB games played (259 for the Twins, 36 for the Braves, 41 for the Houston Astros, 28 for the Seattle Pilots/Milwaukee Brewers, and 18 for the Kansas City Royals), he was credited with 176 hits, with 23 doubles, three triples, seven home runs, and 67 runs batted in. He batted .230 lifetime.

=== Latin-American leagues ===
Valdespino also played in Cuban baseball, the Mexican Pacific League (for a team called Cañeros—the "Sugarcane Growers"—from the city of Los Mochis, and Venezuelan Professional Baseball.

=== Italian League ===
Valdespino managed the Italian team of the Rimini Pirates, and he led them to a Championship season in 1983.

== Personal life and death ==
Valdespino died in Moultrie, Georgia, on February 26, 2023, at the age of 84.
