= Ed Charles =

American baseball player (1933–2018)

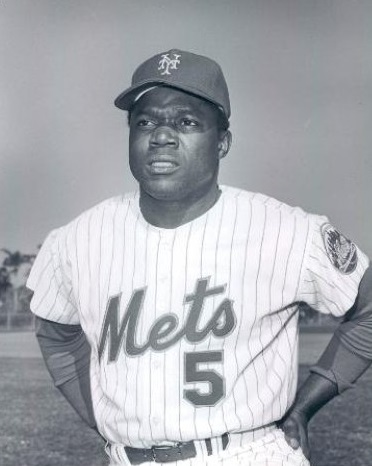
- Charles with the New York Mets
- Third baseman
- Born: April 29, 1933; Daytona Beach, Florida, U.S.
- Died: March 15, 2018 (aged 84); East Elmhurst, Queens, New York, U.S.
- Batted: Right Threw: Right

MLB debut
- April 11, 1962, for the Kansas City Athletics

Last MLB appearance
- October 1, 1969, for the New York Mets

MLB statistics
- Batting average: .263
- Home runs: 86
- Runs batted in: 421
- Stats at Baseball Reference

Teams
- Kansas City Athletics (1962–1967); New York Mets (1967–1969)

Career highlights and awards
- World Series champion (1969); New York State Baseball Hall of Fame

Edwin Douglas Charles (April 29, 1933 – March 15, 2018) was an American professional baseball third baseman in Major League Baseball. A right-handed hitter, Charles played for the Kansas City Athletics (1962–67) and New York Mets (1967–69). He was listed as 5 feet 10 inches (1.78 m) tall and 170 pounds (77 kg).

== Playing career ==
=== Minor league career ===
Charles was originally signed by the Boston Braves in 1952. He spent eight seasons in the Braves' farm system in the still-segregated Deep South, during which he wrote poetry concerning baseball and racism. Due to the presence of longtime All-Star Eddie Mathews at third base, the Braves traded Charles to the Kansas City Athletics prior to the 1962 season with Joe Azcue and Manny Jiménez for Lou Klimchock and Bob Shaw.

=== Kansas City Athletics ===
In his rookie season of 1962, Charles batted .288 with 17 home runs, 74 runs batted in and 20 stolen bases; the batting average, home runs and stolen bases would all be career highs. He was also named to the Topps All-Star Rookie Roster. Charles would retain his steady play for the Athletics over the next four seasons; in 1963 he batted .267 with 15 home runs and a career-best 79 RBIs, and while his batting average fell to .241 in 1964 he still managed 16 home runs and 63 RBIs. Prior to the 1965 season, Athletics owner Charlie Finley moved the fences back in Municipal Stadium, and though Charles batted .269 that year and .286 in 1966, his combined home run total was 17—the same number he had hit in his rookie season.

=== New York Mets ===
On May 10, 1967, the Athletics traded Charles to the New York Mets for Larry Elliot and $50,000. He would be the oldest regular on his new team. In 1968, he led the Mets in home runs with 15. In 1969, he shared third base duties with rookie Wayne Garrett as a member of the Miracle Mets team that unexpectedly won the World Series, after finishing dead last in five of its first seven seasons and 9th in a 10-team National League in the other two. That year, the Mets had trailed the Chicago Cubs by as many as 10 games in the National League East (both leagues had split into two divisions after expanding from 10 teams to 12) on August 13. On September 24, they clinched the division with a 6–0 victory over the St. Louis Cardinals, with Charles homering off Steve Carlton (his final Major League home run) and Donn Clendenon homering twice and Gary Gentry pitching a four-hitter for the victory.

Charles played in four of the five games in the World Series, in which the Mets defeated the heavily favored Baltimore Orioles. After losing the first game, the Mets won the next four; Charles scored the winning run in Game Two on an Al Weis single in the ninth inning. He was the oldest of the "Miracle Mets" at age 36.

After the Series, Charles, whose nickname, "The Glider", came from his third base play and graceful base running, was unconditionally released by the Mets. In his career he batted .263 with 86 home runs and 421 RBIs in 1005 games played.

== Post-playing career ==
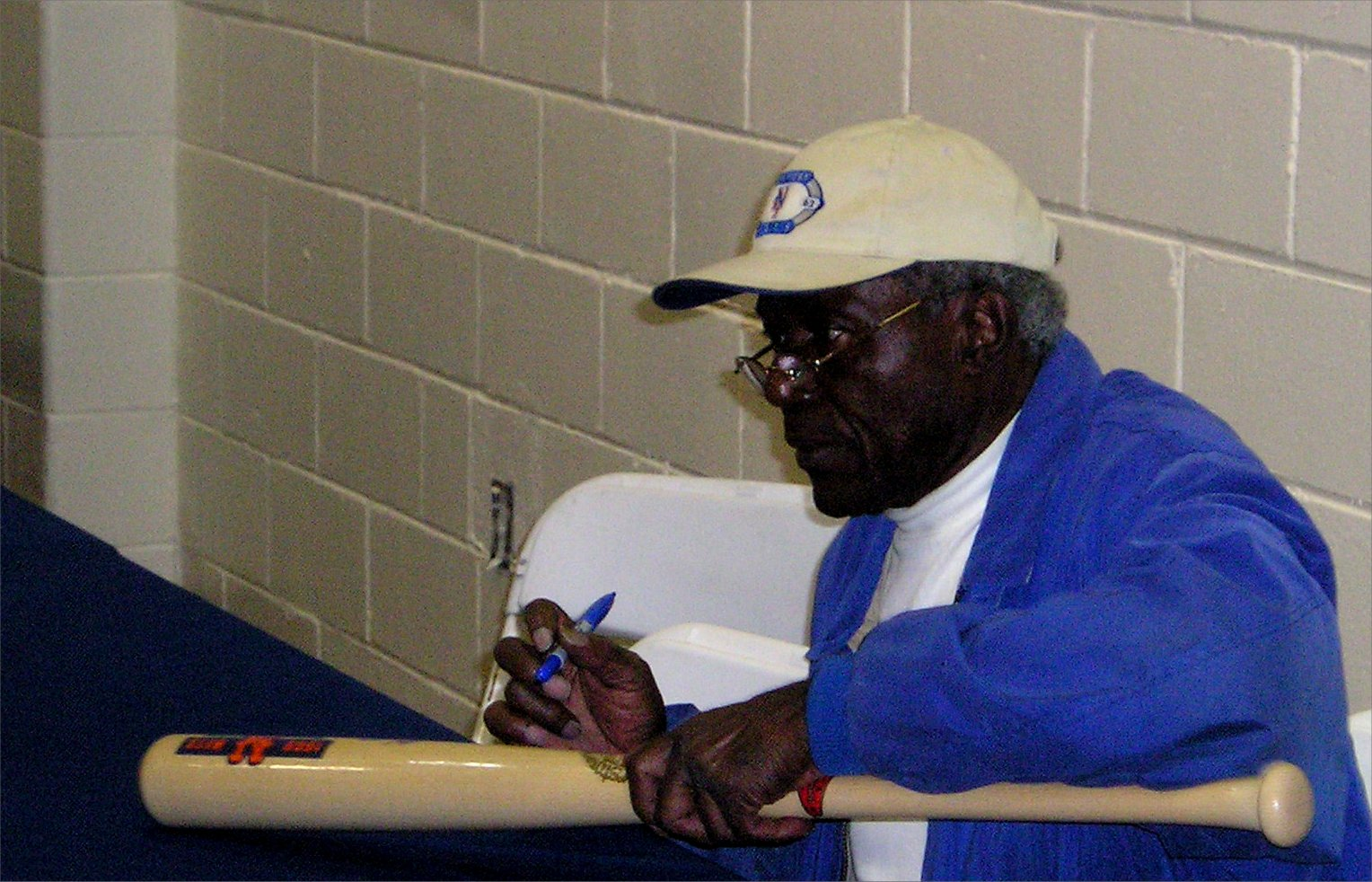
Charles at a baseball show at Hofstra University in 2007

Charles served as a scout for the Mets, and coached the Kingsport Mets. He worked with at-risk youth in group homes in The Bronx.

Charles died on March 15, 2018, at the age of 84. Having served in the U.S. Army during the Korean War, where he attained the ranking of Private First Class, he was buried at Leavenworth National Cemetery in Leavenworth, Kansas.

== In popular culture ==
Ed Charles appears in the 2013 movie 42, played by Dusan Brown. The scene depicts Charles' meeting with Jackie Robinson, when (after Jackie's train had departed) Charles dashed out and put his ear to the train tracks, enthusiastically declaring that he could still hear the train.
