= Vern Holtgrave =

American baseball player (1942–2023)

- Pitcher
- Born: October 18, 1942; Aviston, Illinois, U.S.
- Died: May 8, 2023 (aged 80); O’Fallon, Illinois, U.S.
- Batted: Right Threw: Right

MLB debut
- September 26, 1965, for the Detroit Tigers

Last MLB appearance
- September 26, 1965, for the Detroit Tigers

MLB statistics
- Win–loss record: 0–0
- Earned run average: 6.00
- Strikeouts: 2
- Innings: 3
- Stats at Baseball Reference

Teams
- Detroit Tigers (1965)

Lavern George Holtgrave (October 18, 1942 – May 8, 2023) was an American professional baseball player, a right-handed pitcher who played for six pro seasons (1961–1966) and appeared in one Major League Baseball game for the 1965 Detroit Tigers. He stood 6 feet 1 inch (1.85 m) tall and weighed 183 pounds (83 kg).

Holtgrave was in his fifth season in the Detroit organization when he was recalled at the close of the 1965 season. He had appeared in 49 games in minor league baseball that season, all but one as a relief pitcher, and posted a 2.06 earned run average in 77 innings pitched. In his lone Major League appearance, on September 26, 1965, against the Cleveland Indians, he relieved Phil Regan with Detroit trailing 5–0. He held the Indians off the scoreboard in the fourth and fifth innings but in his third frame, he gave up two earned runs on RBI hits by pitcher Tom Kelley and Leon Wagner. All told, in three MLB innings, Holtgrave surrendered four hits, two runs and two bases on balls, with two strikeouts. He retired after the 1966 season.

Holtgrave died in O’Fallon, Illinois, on May 8, 2023, at the age of 80.
