= Lenny Green =

American baseball player (1933–2019)

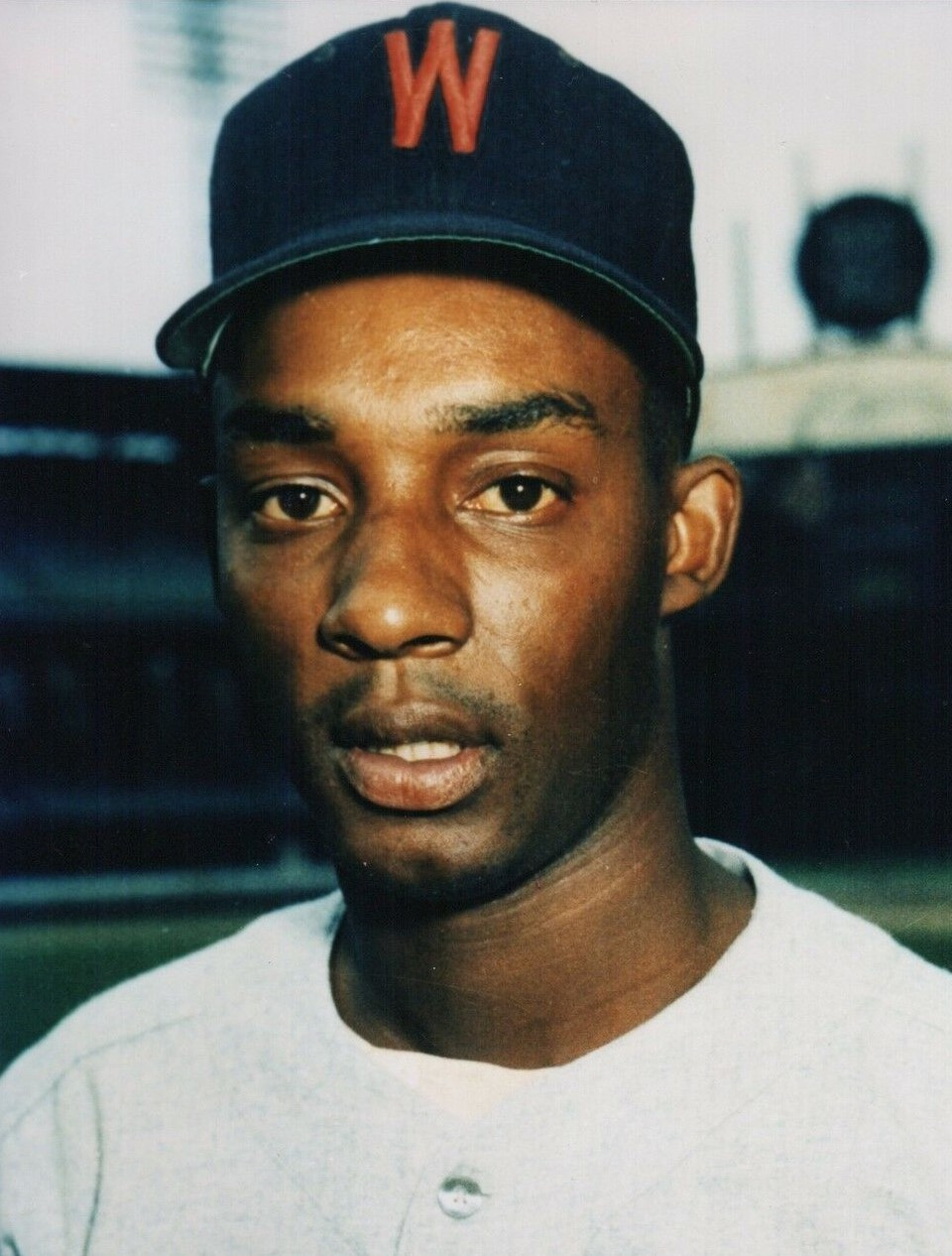
- Center fielder / Left fielder
- Born: January 6, 1933; Detroit, Michigan, U.S.
- Died: January 6, 2019 (aged 86); Detroit, Michigan, U.S.
- Batted: Left Threw: Left

MLB debut
- August 25, 1957, for the Baltimore Orioles

Last MLB appearance
- June 30, 1968, for the Detroit Tigers

MLB statistics
- Batting average: .267
- Home runs: 47
- Runs batted in: 253
- Stats at Baseball Reference

Teams
- Baltimore Orioles (1957–1959); Washington Senators / Minnesota Twins (1959–1964); Los Angeles Angels (1964); Baltimore Orioles (1964); Boston Red Sox (1965–1966); Detroit Tigers (1967–1968)

Leonard Charles Green (January 6, 1933 – January 6, 2019) was an American professional baseball player. The outfielder played in Major League Baseball (MLB) for 12 seasons for the Baltimore Orioles (1957–59; 1964), Washington Senators/Minnesota Twins (1959–64), Los Angeles Angels (1964), Boston Red Sox (1965–66) and Detroit Tigers (1967–68). He batted and threw left-handed and was listed as 5 feet 11 inches (1.80 m) tall and 170 pounds (77 kg).

== Early life ==
Green was born in Detroit, Michigan, and attended Pershing High School.

== Career ==
His career began with the Orioles' farm system in 1955 after service in the United States Army. After three trials with Baltimore, including most of the 1958 season, he was traded to the Senators in May 1959 for 1958 American League Rookie of the Year Albie Pearson. He was the club's regular center fielder in its last year in Washington (1960) and its first two seasons in Minneapolis-St. Paul (1961–62), before losing his regular job to Jimmie Hall in 1963. Green later was the regular center fielder for the 1965 Red Sox.

He finished his MLB career with his hometown Tigers in 1968, the same year the team won the World Series. Green wasn't around for the pennant drive or postseason as the Tigers unconditionally released him in July of that year.

Over his career, Green was a .267 hitter (788-for-2,956) with 47 home runs and 253 RBI in 1,136 games, including 138 doubles, 27 triples, 78 stolen bases, and a .351 on-base percentage. He recorded a .984 fielding percentage playing at all three outfield positions.

== Later life ==
Green died on January 6, 2019, which was his 86th birthday.
