= Don Buschhorn =

American baseball player (born 1946)

- Pitcher
- Born: April 29, 1946 (age 78); Independence, Missouri
- Batted: Right Threw: Right

MLB debut
- May 15, 1965, for the Kansas City Athletics

Last MLB appearance
- August 3, 1965, for the Kansas City Athletics

MLB statistics
- Win–loss record: 0–1
- Earned run average: 4.35
- Strikeouts: 9
- Stats at Baseball Reference

Teams
- Kansas City Athletics (1965)

Donald Lee Buschhorn (born April 29, 1946) is a retired American Major League Baseball pitcher. He played for the Kansas City Athletics during the 1965 season. He is right-hander stood 6 feet (1.8 m) tall and weighed 170 pounds (77 kg).

Buschhorn spent the entire 1965 campaign — his second as a professional — on the Athletics' roster per the bonus rules of the mid-1960s. His first three appearances of that season were as a starting pitcher, and in his debut game against the eventual American League champion Minnesota Twins, Buschhorn struck out the first two big-league batters he faced: Zoilo Versalles and Rich Rollins. Versalles would be the AL Most Valuable Player for 1965. The Twins eventually reached Buschhorn for two runs, including one on a home run by Jerry Kindall, and Buschhorn was tagged with the 2–0 loss, his only MLB decision.

In 31 innings for the Athletics that season, Buschhorn yielded 36 hits and eight bases on balls, striking out nine. His professional career continued in 1966 and 1968–1969.
