= George Banks (baseball) =

American baseball player (1938–1985)

- Third baseman / Outfielder
- Born: September 24, 1938; Pacolet Mills, South Carolina, U.S.
- Died: March 1, 1985 (aged 46); Spartanburg, South Carolina, U.S.
- Batted: Right Threw: Right

MLB debut
- April 15, 1962, for the Minnesota Twins

Last MLB appearance
- May 7, 1966, for the Cleveland Indians

MLB statistics
- Batting average: .219
- Home runs: 9
- Runs batted in: 27
- Stats at Baseball Reference

Teams
- Minnesota Twins (1962–1964); Cleveland Indians (1964–1966)

George Edward Banks (September 24, 1938 – March 1, 1985) was an American professional baseball player. He was a prolific home run hitter in minor league baseball, smashing 223 homers over an 11-year career in the minors. A third baseman and outfielder, he played 106 games of Major League Baseball during all or parts of five seasons (1962–1966) for the Minnesota Twins and Cleveland Indians. Banks threw and batted right-handed, stood 5 feet 11 inches (1.80 m) tall and weighed 185 pounds (84 kg).

Banks was born in Pacolet Mills, South Carolina. He signed originally with the New York Yankees in 1957, and made it only to the Eastern League in the Bombers' system. But after back-to-back minor league seasons in which he hit 29 and 30 home runs, Banks was chosen by the Twins in the 1961 Rule 5 draft and spent the entire 1962 campaign on the Twins' MLB roster. He appeared in 63 games during his rookie season, and batted .252 with four home runs and 15 runs batted in. It was his only full campaign in the Major Leagues. In June 1964 he was part of a key trade, when the Twins sent Banks and pitcher Lee Stange to the Indians for right-handed pitcher Mudcat Grant; Grant would win 21 games and lead the Twins to the 1965 American League championship. Banks played in only 17 games for Cleveland over parts of three seasons, and spent most of the rest of his career in the minors at the Triple-A level. He retired after the 1968 campaign.

George Banks died at age 46 of amyotrophic lateral sclerosis (ALS or Lou Gehrig's Disease). Athletic fields in his native town of Pacolet are named in his memory.
