= Mel Nelson =

American baseball player (1936–2021)

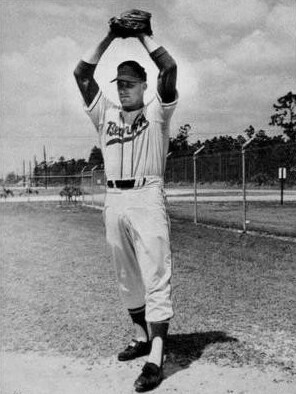
- Pitcher
- Born: May 30, 1936; San Diego, California, U.S.
- Died: November 26, 2021 (aged 85); Highland, California, U.S.
- Batted: Right Threw: Left

MLB debut
- September 27, 1960, for the St. Louis Cardinals

Last MLB appearance
- June 2, 1969, for the St. Louis Cardinals

MLB statistics
- Win–loss record: 4–10
- Earned run average: 4.40
- Strikeouts: 98
- Stats at Baseball Reference

Teams
- St. Louis Cardinals (1960); Los Angeles Angels (1963); Minnesota Twins (1965, 1967); St. Louis Cardinals (1968–1969)

Melvin Frederick Nelson (May 30, 1936 – November 26, 2021) was an American professional baseball player and scout. A left-handed pitcher, the native of San Diego, California, appeared in 93 games, 82 in relief, over six seasons in Major League Baseball for the St. Louis Cardinals, Los Angeles Angels and Minnesota Twins. He was listed as 6 feet (1.8 m) tall and 185 pounds (84 kg).

Nelson's 15-year playing career included the entire 1965 season and parts of five others in the Major Leagues. In 1965, he appeared in 28 games and 542/3 innings pitched for the American League champion Twins and was winless in four decisions with three saves. However, he did not pitch in the 1965 World Series. Three years later, in his second stint with the Cardinals, Nelson—recalled from the minor leagues in midyear—contributed two wins to the Redbirds' 1968 pennant-winning season, both as a starting pitcher. He then appeared in the 1968 World Series in a "mop-up" role in Game 6, hurling a scoreless ninth inning in a game won by the opposing Detroit Tigers, 13–1.

During his big-league career, Nelson allowed 184 hits and 69 bases on balls in 1732/3 innings pitched, recording 98 strikeouts and five saves. He handled 40 total chances (7 putouts, 33 assists) without an error for a perfect 1.000 fielding percentage.

After retiring from the field, Nelson then scouted for the Cardinals and other MLB clubs. Nelson died November 26, 2021, in Highland, California.
