= 1965 Baltimore Orioles season =

Major League Baseball season

1965 Baltimore Orioles
- League: American League
- Ballpark: Memorial Stadium
- City: Baltimore, Maryland
- Record: 94–68 (.580)
- League place: 3rd
- Owners: Jerold Hoffberger
- General managers: Lee MacPhail
- Managers: Hank Bauer
- Television: WJZ-TV
- Radio: WBAL (AM) (Chuck Thompson, Frank Messer)

The 1965 Baltimore Orioles season involved the Orioles finishing third in the American League with a record of 94 wins and 68 losses. This was the final season to feature the full body bird logo on the cap until 1989.

== Offseason ==
- November 28, 1964: Merv Rettenmund was signed as an amateur free agent by the Orioles.

== Regular season ==
=== Season standings ===
American League
Team	W	L	Pct.	GB	Home	Road
Minnesota Twins	102	60	.630	—	51‍–‍30	51‍–‍30
Chicago White Sox	95	67	.586	7	48‍–‍33	47‍–‍34
Baltimore Orioles	94	68	.580	8	46‍–‍33	48‍–‍35
Detroit Tigers	89	73	.549	13	47‍–‍34	42‍–‍39
Cleveland Indians	87	75	.537	15	52‍–‍30	35‍–‍45
New York Yankees	77	85	.475	25	40‍–‍43	37‍–‍42
Los Angeles / California Angels	75	87	.463	27	46‍–‍34	29‍–‍53
Washington Senators	70	92	.432	32	36‍–‍45	34‍–‍47
Boston Red Sox	62	100	.383	40	34‍–‍47	28‍–‍53
Kansas City Athletics	59	103	.364	43	33‍–‍48	26‍–‍55

=== Record vs. opponents ===
1965 American League record Sources:
Team	BAL	BOS	CWS	CLE	DET	KCA	LAA	MIN	NYY	WAS
Baltimore	—	11–7	9–9	10–8	11–7	11–7	13–5	8–10	13–5	8–10
Boston	7–11	—	4–14	8–10	6–12	11–7	5–13	1–17	9–9	11–7
Chicago	9–9	14–4	—	10–8	9–9	13–5	12–6	7–11	8–10	13–5
Cleveland	8–10	10–8	8–10	—	9–9	9–9	9–9	11–7	12–6	11–7
Detroit	7–11	12–6	9–9	9–9	—	13–5	10–8	8–10	10–8	11–7
Kansas City	7–11	7–11	5–13	9–9	5–13	—	5–13	8–10	7–11	6–12
Los Angeles / California	5–13	13–5	6–12	9–9	8–10	13–5	—	9–9	6–12	6–12
Minnesota	10–8	17–1	11–7	7–11	10–8	10–8	9–9	—	13–5	15–3
New York	5–13	9–9	10–8	6–12	8–10	11–7	12–6	5–13	—	11–7
Washington	10–8	7–11	5–13	7–11	7–11	12–6	12–6	3–15	7–11	—

NOTE: The Los Angeles Angels changed their name to California Angels on September 2, 1965, with the season in progress.

=== Notable transactions ===
- April 24, 1965: Bob Saverine and cash were traded by the Orioles to the Houston Astros for Don Larsen.
- June 8, 1965: 1965 Major League Baseball draft
  - Frank Tepedino was drafted by the Orioles in the 3rd round of the 1965 Major League Baseball draft.
  - Lowell Palmer was drafted by the Orioles in the 23rd round, but did not sign.
- July 24, 1965: Carl Warwick was purchased by the Orioles from the St. Louis Cardinals.

=== Roster ===
1965 Baltimore Orioles
Roster
Pitchers: 13 Steve Barber; 38 Ed Barnowski; 40 Frank Bertaina; 27 Wally Bunker; 30 Harvey Haddix; 29 Dick Hall; 43 Darold Knowles; 18 Don Larsen; 19 Dave McNally; 35 John Miller; 37 Stu Miller; 22 Jim Palmer; 32 Milt Pappas; 38 Robin Roberts; 35 Ken Rowe; 24 Herm Starrette	Catchers: 10 Dick Brown; 8 Andy Etchebarren; 44 Charley Lau; 12 John Orsino; Infielders: 7 Jerry Adair; 11 Luis Aparicio; 33 Mark Belanger; 2 Bob Johnson; 6 Davey Johnson; 26 Boog Powell; 5 Brooks Robinson; 4 Norm Siebern	Outfielders: 6,33 Paul Blair; 3 Curt Blefary; 16 Sam Bowens; 25 Jackie Brandt; 9 Russ Snyder; 23 Carl Warwick	Manager: 42 Hank Bauer; Coaches: 31 Harry Brecheen; 55 Billy Hunter; 41 Sherm Lollar; 14 Gene Woodling

== Player stats ==
=== Batting ===
==== Starters by position ====
Note: Pos = Position; G = Games played; AB = At bats; H = Hits; Avg. = Batting average; HR = Home runs; RBI = Runs batted in

Pos	Player	G	AB	H	Avg.	HR	RBI
C	Dick Brown	96	255	59	.231	5	30
1B	Boog Powell	144	472	117	.248	17	72
2B	Jerry Adair	157	582	151	.259	7	66
3B	Brooks Robinson	144	559	166	.297	18	80
SS	Luis Aparicio	144	564	127	.225	8	40
LF	Russ Snyder	132	345	93	.270	1	29
CF	Paul Blair	119	364	85	.234	5	25
RF	Curt Blefary	144	462	120	.260	22	70

==== Other batters ====
Note: G = Games played; AB = At bats; H = Hits; Avg. = Batting average; HR = Home runs; RBI = Runs batted in

Player	G	AB	H	Avg.	HR	RBI
Norm Siebern	106	297	76	.256	8	32
Bob Johnson	87	273	66	.242	5	27
Jackie Brandt	96	243	59	.243	8	24
John Orsino	77	232	54	.233	9	28
Sam Bowens	84	203	33	.163	7	20
Charley Lau	68	132	39	.295	2	18
Davey Johnson	20	47	8	.170	1	11
Carl Warwick	9	14	0	.000	0	0
Andy Etchebarren	5	6	1	.167	1	4
Mark Belanger	11	3	1	.333	0	0

=== Pitching ===
==== Starting pitchers ====
Note: G = Games pitched; IP = Innings pitched; W = Wins; L = Losses; ERA = Earned run average; SO = Strikeouts

Player	G	IP	W	L	ERA	SO
Milt Pappas	34	221.1	13	9	2.60	127
Steve Barber	37	220.2	15	10	2.69	130
Dave McNally	35	198.2	11	6	2.85	116
Wally Bunker	34	189.0	10	8	3.38	84
Robin Roberts	20	114.2	5	7	3.37	63
John Miller	16	93.1	6	4	3.72	71

==== Other pitchers ====
Note: G = Games pitched; IP = Innings pitched; W = Wins; L = Losses; ERA = Earned run average; SO = Strikeouts

Player	G	IP	W	L	ERA	SO
Jim Palmer	27	92.0	5	4	3.72	75
Darold Knowles	5	14.2	0	1	9.20	12
Frank Bertaina	2	6.0	0	0	6.00	5

==== Relief pitchers ====
Note: G = Games pitched; W = Wins; L = Losses; SV = Saves; ERA = Earned run average; SO = Strikeouts

Player	G	W	L	SV	ERA	SO
Stu Miller	67	14	7	24	1.89	104
Dick Hall	48	11	8	12	3.07	79
Don Larsen	27	1	2	1	2.67	40
Harvey Haddix	24	3	2	1	3.48	21
Ken Rowe	6	0	0	0	3.38	3
Ed Barnowski	4	0	0	0	2.08	6
Herm Starrette	4	0	0	0	1.00	3

== Farm system ==
Level	Team	League	Manager
AAA	Rochester Red Wings	International League	Darrell Johnson
AA	Elmira Pioneers	Eastern League	Earl Weaver
A	Stockton Ports	California League	Harry Malmberg
A	Fox Cities Foxes	Midwest League	Billy DeMars
A	Tri-City Atoms	Northwest League	Cal Ripken Sr.
A-Short Season	Aberdeen Pheasants	Northern League	Ray Rippelmeyer
Rookie	Bluefield Orioles	Appalachian League	Jim Frey

LEAGUE CHAMPIONS: Stockton, Tri-City
