= Jay Ritchie =

American baseball player (1936–2016)

- Pitcher
- Born: November 20, 1936; Salisbury, North Carolina, U.S.
- Died: January 5, 2016 (aged 79); Rockwell, North Carolina, U.S.
- Batted: Right Threw: Right

MLB debut
- August 4, 1964, for the Boston Red Sox

Last MLB appearance
- September 6, 1968, for the Cincinnati Reds

MLB statistics
- Win–loss record: 8–13
- Earned run average: 3.49
- Strikeouts: 212
- Stats at Baseball Reference

Teams
- Boston Red Sox (1964–1965); Atlanta Braves (1966–1967); Cincinnati Reds (1968)

Jay Seay Ritchie (November 20, 1936 – January 5, 2016) was an American professional baseball right-handed pitcher, who played in Major League Baseball (MLB) for the Boston Red Sox, Atlanta Braves and Cincinnati Reds from 1964 to 1968.

== Early life ==
Ritchie attended Granite Quarry High School in Granite Quarry, North Carolina where he starred in baseball and basketball. His combined pitching record his junior and senior years was 24–0 and upon graduation he was also the county's all-time basketball scoring leader.

== Career ==
The lanky Ritchie stood 6 feet (1.8 m) tall and weighed 175 pounds (79 kg). He was originally signed by the Red Sox as an amateur free agent in 1955. He was in his ninth season in Boston's farm system when he made his big league debut with the Red Sox on August 4, 1964, in a road game against the Minnesota Twins. Entering the game in relief of Bill Monbouquette, the first batter Ritchie faced was Baseball Hall of Fame slugger Harmon Killebrew, who singled. In four innings pitched that game, Ritchie allowed two hits and three walks, but did not allow an earned run in the 12–4 loss.

Ritchie's rookie season overall was the best season of his career—in 21 games, he had a 1–1 record with a fine 2.74 earned run average (ERA) in 46 innings. The 1965 season was also a successful one for Ritchie, as he was 1–2 with a 3.17 ERA in 44 relief appearances, as was 1967, when he was 4–6 but again posted a 3.17 ERA in 52 relief appearances — which ranked 10th in the National League (NL).

On January 11, 1966, Ritchie was sent to the Atlanta Braves to complete a trade announced on December 15, 1965, in which the Red Sox sent Lee Thomas, Arnold Earley, and a player to be named later (Ritchie) to the Braves for Bob Sadowski and Dan Osinski.

Ritchie spent two seasons with the Braves, appearing in 22 games and posting a 4.08 ERA in 1966 and appearing in 52 games in 1967, posting a 3.17 ERA. In 1967, he tied for tenth in the league with Bob Miller in pitching appearances.

Following the 1967 season, Ritchie was traded to the Reds with Jim Beauchamp and Mack Jones for Deron Johnson.

Ritchie played his final season in 1968, appearing in 28 games for the Reds, starting two of them. Overall, he posted a 4.61 ERA that year, which was nearly a point and a half higher than the league average.

Overall in his MLB career, Ritchie posted an 8–13 record in 167 games. In 291 1/3 innings of work, he struck out 212 batters, walked 94 and had a 3.49 ERA. As a batter, he hit .200 in 35 at-bats, with the highlight of his hitting career being a triple he hit off a Don Cardwell of the New York Mets on May 16, 1967. It was the only extra base hit of his career. He had a .940 career fielding percentage.

In 2004, Ritchie was inducted into the Salisbury Rowan Sports Hall of Fame.

== Later life and death ==
Ritchie lived in Kannapolis, North Carolina and died on January 5, 2016, in Rockwell, North Carolina.
