= Ron Tompkins (baseball) =

American baseball player (1944–2023)

- Pitcher
- Born: November 27, 1944; San Diego, California, U.S.
- Died: February 4, 2023 (aged 78); Laguna Niguel, California, U.S.
- Batted: Right Threw: Right

MLB debut
- September 9, 1965, for the Kansas City Athletics

Last MLB appearance
- September 29, 1971, for the Chicago Cubs

MLB statistics
- Win–loss record: 0–2
- Earned run average: 3.96
- Strikeouts: 24
- Stats at Baseball Reference

Teams
- Kansas City Athletics (1965); Chicago Cubs (1971)

Ronald Everett Tompkins (November 27, 1944 – February 4, 2023) was an American professional baseball pitcher. He played in Major League Baseball (MLB) for the Kansas City Athletics (1965) and Chicago Cubs (1971). Tompkins never won a big-league game in his career. He was notable for sharing the 1968 Topps rookie card alongside MLB Hall-of-Fame catcher Johnny Bench.
