= Dave Morehead =

American baseball player (1942–2025)

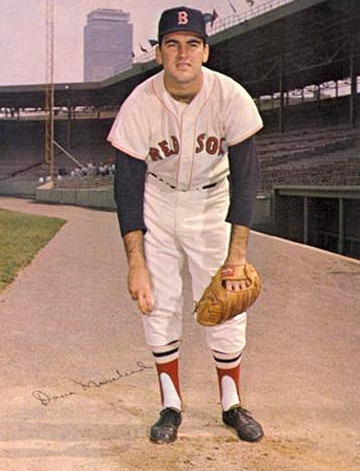
- Morehead in 1966
- Pitcher
- Born: September 5, 1943; San Diego, California, U.S.
- Died: November 23, 2025 (aged 82); Santa Ana, California, U.S.
- Batted: Right Threw: Right

MLB debut
- April 13, 1963, for the Boston Red Sox

Last MLB appearance
- September 29, 1970, for the Kansas City Royals

MLB statistics
- Win–loss record: 40–64
- Earned run average: 4.15
- Strikeouts: 627
- Stats at Baseball Reference

Teams
- Boston Red Sox (1963–1968); Kansas City Royals (1969–1970)

Career highlights and awards
- Pitched a no-hitter on September 16, 1965

David Michael Morehead (September 5, 1943 – November 23, 2025) was an American professional baseball player. A right-handed pitcher, he played eight seasons in the major leagues, for the Boston Red Sox and Kansas City Royals.

== Early years ==
Morehead was born in San Diego in September 1943. (Note: Both Retrosheet and his biography by the Society for American Baseball Research list his year of birth as 1943; MLB.com lists it as 1942.) He played Little League Baseball and graduated from Hoover High School in 1961. He was signed by the Boston Red Sox as an amateur free agent on June 16, 1961, as the Major League Baseball draft was not instituted until 1965.

== Career ==
Morehead first pitched in Minor League Baseball in 1961 at the Class A level, posting a 4.80 earned run average (ERA). He then pitched at the Triple-A level in the Pacific Coast League during 1962; his ERA that season was 3.72 in 26 appearances, all starts.

As a major-league rookie in 1963, Morehead broke into the starting rotation of the Red Sox and posted a 10–13 win–loss record with a 3.81 ERA. He shut out the Washington Senators in his major-league debut on April 13. On May 12 of that same year, he pitched a one-hitter against the same Senators, the lone hit coming on a Chuck Hinton home run.

In 1964, Morehead went 8–15 and his ERA ballooned to 4.97. In 1965, he tied for the American League lead with 18 losses, against 10 victories, for a Red Sox team that finished next-to-last, with 100 losses. On September 16 of the latter year, the same day the Red Sox fired Pinky Higgins as general manager, Morehead no-hit the Cleveland Indians 2–0 before only 1,247 fans in a day game at Fenway Park, the lone baserunner coming on Rocky Colavito's second-inning walk. Not until Hideo Nomo in 2001 would another Red Sox pitch a no-hitter, and the next no-hitter at Fenway Park wouldn't come until 2002 (Derek Lowe). It was the fourth no-hitter by a Red Sox pitcher in a ten-year period, following Mel Parnell pitching one in 1956 and Earl Wilson and Bill Monbouquette both pitching one in 1962. Parnell's and Wilson's no-hitters, like Morehead's, had also been pitched at Fenway Park, one of the major league's most notorious hitter-friendly stadiums.

Over the next three years, Morehead was beset by arm ailments that limited him to 33 games pitched, one fewer than in 1965. He was a member of the Carl Yastrzemski-led "Impossible Dream" team that won the American League pennant in 1967, and he pitched two games in relief in that season's World Series, which the Red Sox lost to the St. Louis Cardinals in seven games. Morehead posted a 2.45 ERA during the 1968 season, the lowest of his major-league career, while posting a 1–4 record from 11 appearances including nine starts. He also pitched in a total of 35 Triple-A games during 1967 and 1968.

In the October 1968 expansion draft, Morehead was selected by the Kansas City Royals. He pitched in 21 games for the Royals during the 1969 season, 19 in relief, accruing a 5.63 ERA and a 2–3 record. In 1970, he pitched in 28 games (17 starts) and had 3–5 record and a 3.62 ERA. In spring training of 1971, the Royals released him; he had pitched his final game at 28 years of age, the arm ailments having ended his career prematurely.

In his career, Morehead won 40 games against 64 losses with a 4.15 ERA and 627 strikeouts in 819 1/3 innings pitched. He also exhibited periods of wildness, issuing 463 base on balls while throwing 41 wild pitches. In each of his first three seasons, Morehead was second in the American League in walks with 99, 112 and 113 respectively.

== Personal life ==
Following his baseball career, Morehead earned a degree in marketing from San Diego State University and later started his own marketing business. He was married in 1963; he and his wife had one son and one daughter. Morehead died on November 23, 2025.

== See also ==
- List of Major League Baseball no-hitters

== Notes ==
Preceded by Sandy Koufax	No-hitter pitcher September 16, 1965	Succeeded by Sonny Siebert
