= Tom Harrison (baseball) =

Canadian baseball player

- Pitcher
- Born: January 18, 1945; Trail, British Columbia, Canada
- Died: July 26, 2023 (aged 78)
- Batted: Right Threw: Right

MLB debut
- May 7, 1965, for the Kansas City Athletics

Last MLB appearance
- May 17, 1965, for the Kansas City Athletics

MLB statistics
- Win–loss record: 0-0
- Earned run average: 9.00
- Strikeouts: 0
- Stats at Baseball Reference

Teams
- Kansas City Athletics (1965)

Thomas James Harrison (January 18, 1945 – July 26, 2023) was a Canadian Major League Baseball pitcher. He pitched in one game for the Kansas City Athletics in 1965.

Although he was a pitcher, Harrison made his major league debut as a pinch runner. Ten days later, he made his pitching debut, giving up one run in one inning.
