= Randy Schwartz =

American baseball player (born 1944)

- First baseman
- Born: February 9, 1944 (age 81); Los Angeles, California, U.S.
- Batted: Left Threw: Left

MLB debut
- September 8, 1965, for the Kansas City Athletics

Last MLB appearance
- September 24, 1966, for the Kansas City Athletics

MLB statistics
- Batting average: .167
- Home runs: 0
- Runs batted in: 2

Teams
- Kansas City Athletics (1965–1966)

Douglas Randall Schwartz (born February 9, 1944) is an American former professional baseball player who appeared in 16 games played in the Major Leagues as a first baseman and pinch hitter for the 1965–1966 Kansas City Athletics. He threw and batted left-handed, stood 6 feet 3 inches (1.91 m) tall and weighed 230 pounds (100 kg).

Schwartz was signed by the A's after a standout career at the UCLA, where he was a 1964 first-team College Baseball All-America Team selection. He played three full years of minor league baseball, from 1965–67, and hit 29 and 22 home runs in his first two seasons, with an OPS of 1.018 in his rookie year in the Class A Midwest League.

In his two late-season MLB trials, Schwartz recorded three hits, all singles, in 18 at bats.

He will be inducted into the UCLA Athletics Hall of Fame as a member of the 2023 class.
