= Woodie Held =

American baseball player (1932–2009)

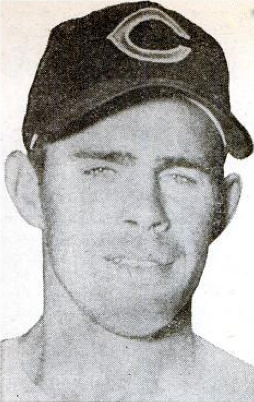
- Held in 1960
- Infielder / Outfielder
- Born: March 25, 1932; Sacramento, California, U.S.
- Died: June 11, 2009 (aged 77); Dubois, Wyoming, U.S.
- Batted: Right Threw: Right

MLB debut
- September 5, 1954, for the New York Yankees

Last MLB appearance
- September 28, 1969, for the Chicago White Sox

MLB statistics
- Batting average: .240
- Home runs: 179
- Runs batted in: 559
- Stats at Baseball Reference

Teams
- New York Yankees (1954, 1957); Kansas City Athletics (1957–1958); Cleveland Indians (1958–1964); Washington Senators (1965); Baltimore Orioles (1966–1967); California Angels (1967–1968); Chicago White Sox (1968–1969)

Woodson George "Woodie" Held (March 25, 1932 – June 11, 2009) was an American shortstop/outfielder in Major League Baseball (MLB) who played for the New York Yankees, Kansas City Athletics, Cleveland Indians, Washington Senators, Baltimore Orioles, California Angels and Chicago White Sox. He batted and threw right-handed. His last name was originally Heldt, but later changed it to Held due to confusion pronouncing his name.

== Biography ==
Born in Sacramento, California on March 25, 1932, Held served as a batboy for the hometown Solons in the mid-1940s. Originally signed by the Yankees for a $6,000 bonus prior to the 1951 season, he made his major league debut on September 5, 1954. After spending almost all of his 6 1/2 years with the Yankees in its minor league system, he was traded along with Billy Martin, Ralph Terry and Bob Martyn to Kansas City for Ryne Duren, Harry Simpson and Jim Pisoni on June 15, 1957 (the MLB trade deadline at the time) in one of the many deals made between the two clubs during the late-1950s. Even though he had been primarily a middle infielder, Held became the Athletics' starting center fielder as a rookie, hitting 20 homers.

His time with the Athletics lasted exactly one year, as he was dealt to Cleveland, along with Vic Power, for Roger Maris, Dick Tomanek and Preston Ward on June 15, 1958. For five campaigns beginning in 1959, Held was a regular in the starting lineup, first at shortstop before shifting to second base in 1963. He was the first Indians' shortstop to hit at least 20 homers in a season, achieving it in each of three consecutive years (29 in 1959, 21 in 1960, 23 in 1961). He had possessed the team's career record for most home runs by a shortstop with 85 until he was surpassed by Jhonny Peralta on May 1, 2009. Held's 6 1/2 seasons in Cleveland came to an end on November 1, 1964, when he was traded with Bob Chance to Washington for Chuck Hinton.

Held spent his last four major league years as a versatile reserve who played each of the three outfield positions plus the middle and left side of the infield. After one campaign with the Senators, he was acquired by the Orioles on October 12, 1965, for John Orsino. Held was on Baltimore's 1966 World Series roster, but didn't see any action. He was sent to the Angels on June 15, 1967, for Marcelino López and a minor leaguer. He joined the White Sox on July 20, 1968, in exchange for Wayne Causey. Held's professional baseball career ended when he was released on October 15, 1969. In a 14-season career, he posted a .240 batting average with 179 home runs and 559 runs batted in (RBI) in 1,390 games played.

Held died at his Dubois, Wyoming ranch on June 11, 2009, after a seven-month battle with brain cancer.
