= Rich Rollins =

American baseball player (1938–2025)

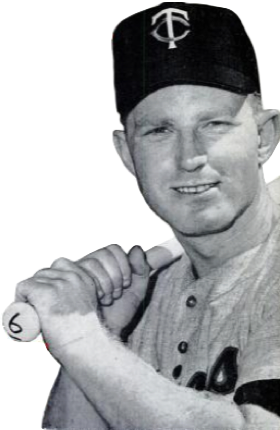
- Rollins in 1962
- Third baseman
- Born: April 16, 1938; Mount Pleasant, Pennsylvania, U.S.
- Died: May 13, 2025 (aged 87); Akron, Ohio, U.S.
- Batted: Right Threw: Right

MLB debut
- June 16, 1961, for the Minnesota Twins

Last MLB appearance
- September 26, 1970, for the Cleveland Indians

MLB statistics
- Batting average: .269
- Home runs: 77
- Runs batted in: 399
- Stats at Baseball Reference

Teams
- Minnesota Twins (1961–1968); Seattle Pilots / Milwaukee Brewers (1969–1970); Cleveland Indians (1970)

Career highlights and awards
- 2× All-Star (1962, 1962²)

Richard John Rollins (April 16, 1938 – May 13, 2025) was an American professional baseball third baseman. He played in Major League Baseball (MLB) for the Minnesota Twins (1961–68), Seattle Pilots / Milwaukee Brewers (1969–1970), and Cleveland Indians (1970). He was named an All-Star with the Twins in 1962. During a 10-year baseball career, Rollins's batting average was .269 with 77 home runs, and 399 runs batted in (RBI).

== Early life ==
Richard John Rollins was born on April 16, 1938, in Mount Pleasant, Pennsylvania, near Pittsburgh. The family moved to the Cleveland, Ohio, area, where Rollins attended Parma High School. Rollins played baseball in high school as well as for an American Legion team. He accepted a baseball scholarship to Kent State University, where he played for the Golden Flashes from 1958 to 1960. He primarily played second base while at Kent State. Rollins had a .429 batting average in 1959, and a .358 batting average his senior year, with a career batting average of .3891. He was named three times to the All-Mid-American Conference team. He played second base, with future major league player and manager Gene Michael at shortstop.

He graduated in 1960, with a Bachelor of Science degree in Health, Physical Education and Recreation.

== Playing career ==
=== Minor League career ===
Rollins was signed for $6,000 as an undrafted free agent by the then Washington Senators prior to the start of the 1960 season. He was assigned to the Wilson Tobs in the Class-B Carolina League, under future major league manager Jack McKeon. He hit into a triple play in his first professional game, which left a significant impact on his baseball career. As a result, despite the embarrassment, it was the main motivation for Rollins to become a better ballplayer.

After hitting .341 with eight home runs and 43 RBIs in 62 games, in 1961, Rollins was promoted to Syracuse Chiefs in the Triple-A International League (IL). A few weeks into the season, after playing only three games, he was assigned to the Single-A Charlotte Hornets in the South Atlantic League. He hit .270 with four home runs and 16 RBIs in 36 early-season games at Charlotte, playing four games in the outfield and then being shifted to third base.

=== Twins career ===
Rollins was promoted to the Twins and made his major league debut on June 16, 1961, against the Chicago White Sox. He finished the game 1-for-4 in Minnesota's 6–1 win. His first major league hit was against future Hall of Fame pitcher Early Wynn. Rollins spent the rest of the season with the Twins as a little-used bench player, batting .294 with 3 RBIs in 13 games. During spring training, in 1962, Rollins started in both shortstop and third base. Twins owner Calvin Griffith saw Rollins's potential at third base, and recommended that Rollins should be given the job over more experienced players like Harmon Killebrew, and John Goryl.

Griffith stated that it was Rollins's "sincerity and steadiness" on how he handled the position that proved that he could start in the American League. Having got the job, Rollins responded by hitting .486 over the Twins' first 10 games. Playing in 159 games, Rollins finished the season hitting .298 with 16 home runs and 96 RBIs, production that would earn him the nickname, at least among his teammates, of Pie, after Pittsburgh Pirates Hall of Fame third baseman, Pie Traynor. Rollins was also compared to former longtime Senators third baseman Ossie Bluege.

Rollins finished eighth in the American League MVP voting and also received the most All-Star Game votes of any American League player, starting both games that year ahead of Hall of Fame third baseman Brooks Robinson. Rollins represented the Twins well in the games, reaching base three times in six plate appearances and scoring the AL's only run in their 3–1 loss in the July 10 game. Supporting his MVP candidacy and All-Star appearances, Rollins finished in the top 10 in the league in singles (second), plate appearances (third), sacrifice flies (third), hits (sixth), at-bats (sixth), runs (seventh), on-base percentage (seventh), runs batted in (RBI) (ninth), and batting average (tenth). His Twins teammates voted him the team's MVP in 1962.

While he finished third in assists by third basemen, his 28 errors were the most by any AL third baseman and second most in the league behind Detroit Tigers' infielder Dick McAuliffe. While Rollins's glove work would never be as bad (his errors would decrease from 28 to eight over the next four seasons), his results at the plate would also decline, despite an almost-as-good 1963 season (.307, 16 home runs, 61 RBIs), even after suffering a broken jaw when he was hit by a pitch early in the season. The .307 average was third in the American League. He played in 140 games for the 1965 Twins American League championship team. Rollins helped the Twins to win the 1965 American League pennant.

On June 9, 1966, in the seventh inning of a game against the Kansas City Athletics, Rollins was one of five Twins players to hit home runs. The others were Harmon Killebrew, Don Mincher, Tony Oliva and Zoilo Versalles. These five home runs still stand as a Major League record for the most home runs hit in a single inning, and were hit off starter Catfish Hunter (two) and relievers Paul Lindblad (two) and John Wyatt (one). The Houston Astros tied that record in 2022. During the season, he was platooning at third base with Killebrew and César Tovar, among others, with Killebrew playing 107 games at third base.

Rollins career was plagued by illness and injury. In addition to his 1963 broken jaw, among other things, he went to the Mayo Clinic before the 1964 season to treat calcium deposits on his hip. In 1967, he had an infected hand and badly bruised knee in spring training, and a later knee injury that cost him three weeks. His now arthritic hip left him playing in great pain, as well as the chronic pain he was suffering from his knee injuries which had not been properly treated. Twins' owner Calvin Griffith convinced Rollins to go for knee treatment at the Mayo Clinic, rather than retire. Rollins suffered a variety of odd but serious injuries in 1968. In 1969, after leaving the Twins, he had a bad back, and recurrence of knee problems that led to more surgery and the 60-day disabled list.

=== Later career ===
Left exposed to the 1968 expansion draft, Rollins was the 26th pick of the Seattle Pilots on October 15. The Pilots played one year in Seattle (1969), and then moved to Milwaukee in 1970. After backing up Tommy Harper at third base for the Pilots in 1969, Rollins was Harper's backup again beginning the 1970 season in Milwaukee. Rollins was released by the infant Milwaukee Brewers on May 13, 1970, after starting the season hitting .200 with 5 RBIs in 14 games. Rollins was immediately signed by the Cleveland Indians, for whom he would finish the season before retiring. He worked in the Indians front office. Rollins would run baseball camps and then worked in the National Basketball Association (NBA) for the Cleveland Cavaliers.

== Honors ==
Rollins was inducted into the Kent State Sports Hall of Fame in 1979. He was inducted into the Summit County [Ohio] Sports Hall of Fame in 1999. He was inducted into the Greater Akron [Ohio] Baseball Hall of Fame in 2001. In 2014, he was named to the Kent State All-Time Baseball Team.

== Personal life and death ==
Rollins met former United Airlines stewardess Lynn Maher of Newport Beach, California, in 1962. He married Maher on February 9, 1963. They had six children.

Rollins died in Akron, Ohio on May 13, 2025, at the age of 87.

== See also ==
- List of Major League Baseball annual triples leaders
