= Wayne Redmond =

American baseball player (1945–2020)

- Outfielder/Pinch hitter
- Born: November 25, 1945; Athens, Alabama
- Died: August 8, 2020 (aged 74); Detroit, Michigan
- Batted: Right Threw: Right

MLB debut
- September 7, 1965, for the Detroit Tigers

Last MLB appearance
- September 18, 1969, for the Detroit Tigers

MLB statistics
- Batting average: .000
- Runs scored: 1
- At bats: 7
- Stats at Baseball Reference

Teams
- Detroit Tigers (1965; 1969)

Howard Wayne Redmond (November 25, 1945 – August 8, 2020) was an American professional baseball player. He played 933 games of minor league baseball during his nine-season (1965–1973) career, and had brief trials with the 1965 and 1969 Detroit Tigers of the Major Leagues. In nine MLB games played as an outfielder, pinch hitter and pinch runner, Redmond drew one base on balls in eight plate appearances with no hits. He scored one run.

Redmond threw and batted right-handed, stood 5 feet 10 inches (1.78 m) tall and weighed 165 pounds (75 kg). He was signed by the Tigers after graduating from Detroit's Central High School and hit 31 home runs in his first minor league season, split between Detroit farm clubs at the Class A and Double-A levels. That led to his first late-season trial in 1965. Redmond started one game during his MLB career, in centerfield on October 3, and went hitless in four at bats against Joe Coleman of the Washington Senators. Apart from his September 1969 callup to the Tigers, in which he played in five games as a pinch hitter and pinch runner, Redmond spent the remainder of his career in the minors.

After his career in baseball, Redmond became an Elder in The Church of Our Lord Jesus Christ of the Apostolic Faith (COOLJC). Elder Wayne Redmond died on August 8, 2020; he is interred at Detroit's Grand Lawn Cemetery.
