= 1965 Minnesota Twins season =

1965 Minnesota Twins
- American League champions
- League: American League
- Ballpark: Metropolitan Stadium
- City: Bloomington, Minnesota
- Record: 102–60 (.630)
- Divisional place: 1st
- Owners: Calvin Griffith (majority owner, with Thelma Griffith Haynes)
- General managers: Calvin Griffith
- Managers: Sam Mele
- Television: WTCN-TV
- Radio: 830 WCCO AM (Ray Scott, Herb Carneal, Halsey Hall)

The 1965 Minnesota Twins season was the 5th season for the Minnesota Twins franchise in the Twin Cities of Minnesota, their 5th season at Metropolitan Stadium and the 65th overall in the American League.

The Twins won the 1965 American League pennant with a 102–60 record. It was the team's first pennant since moving to Minnesota, and the 102 wins is a team record.

== Regular season ==
On April 27, in addition to being the game's winning pitcher, Camilo Pascual hit a grand slam in the first inning – the second of his career. The Detroit Tigers' Dizzy Trout is the only pitcher to have done that before.

The Twins spent much of the summer in a race for first with the Baltimore Orioles. On July 1, however, the Twins took first place and kept it, ultimately winning the pennant by seven games.

Six Twins made the All-Star Game (which was played in the Twins' home park, Metropolitan Stadium). First baseman Harmon Killebrew, shortstop Zoilo Versalles, outfielders Tony Oliva and Jimmie Hall, catcher Earl Battey, and pitcher Mudcat Grant all appeared in the game.

On September 26 at D.C. Stadium in Washington, D.C. – the city the Twins franchise called home until 1961 — the Twins beat the Washington Senators 2–1 to clinch the pennant. Jim Kaat was the winning pitcher.

Overall, 1,463,258 fans attended Twins games, the highest total in the American League. During the season, the Twins played in front of their largest crowd ever (71,245 at Yankee Stadium on June 20) and their smallest crowd ever (537 at home, September 20).

=== Offense ===
Versalles was named AL Most Valuable Player. He also led the team with 126 runs scored, and won a Gold Glove Award for his play at shortstop. Oliva led the AL with a .321 batting average. Killebrew was limited to 113 games by injuries, but still hit 25 HR and 75 RBI.

=== Pitching ===
Grant led the league with 21 wins, becoming the first black pitcher in the history of the American League to win 20 games in a season. Kaat won the Gold Glove for pitchers.

=== Season standings ===
American League
Team	W	L	Pct.	GB	Home	Road
Minnesota Twins	102	60	.630	—	51‍–‍30	51‍–‍30
Chicago White Sox	95	67	.586	7	48‍–‍33	47‍–‍34
Baltimore Orioles	94	68	.580	8	46‍–‍33	48‍–‍35
Detroit Tigers	89	73	.549	13	47‍–‍34	42‍–‍39
Cleveland Indians	87	75	.537	15	52‍–‍30	35‍–‍45
New York Yankees	77	85	.475	25	40‍–‍43	37‍–‍42
Los Angeles / California Angels	75	87	.463	27	46‍–‍34	29‍–‍53
Washington Senators	70	92	.432	32	36‍–‍45	34‍–‍47
Boston Red Sox	62	100	.383	40	34‍–‍47	28‍–‍53
Kansas City Athletics	59	103	.364	43	33‍–‍48	26‍–‍55

=== Record vs. opponents ===
1965 American League record Sources:
Team	BAL	BOS	CWS	CLE	DET	KCA	LAA	MIN	NYY	WAS
Baltimore	—	11–7	9–9	10–8	11–7	11–7	13–5	8–10	13–5	8–10
Boston	7–11	—	4–14	8–10	6–12	11–7	5–13	1–17	9–9	11–7
Chicago	9–9	14–4	—	10–8	9–9	13–5	12–6	7–11	8–10	13–5
Cleveland	8–10	10–8	8–10	—	9–9	9–9	9–9	11–7	12–6	11–7
Detroit	7–11	12–6	9–9	9–9	—	13–5	10–8	8–10	10–8	11–7
Kansas City	7–11	7–11	5–13	9–9	5–13	—	5–13	8–10	7–11	6–12
Los Angeles / California	5–13	13–5	6–12	9–9	8–10	13–5	—	9–9	6–12	6–12
Minnesota	10–8	17–1	11–7	7–11	10–8	10–8	9–9	—	13–5	15–3
New York	5–13	9–9	10–8	6–12	8–10	11–7	12–6	5–13	—	11–7
Washington	10–8	7–11	5–13	7–11	7–11	12–6	12–6	3–15	7–11	—

NOTE: The Los Angeles Angels changed their name to California Angels on September 2, 1965, with the season in progress.

=== Notable transactions ===
- June 8, 1965: 1965 Major League Baseball draft
  - Del Unser was drafted by the Twins in the 2nd round, but did not sign.
  - Graig Nettles was drafted by the Twins in the 4th round.

=== Roster ===
1965 Minnesota Twins
Roster
Pitchers: 23 Dave Boswell; 35 Pete Cimino; 26 Jerry Fosnow; 33 Mudcat Grant; 36 Jim Kaat; 27 Johnny Klippstein; 26 Jim Merritt; 29 Mel Nelson; 17 Camilo Pascual; 31 Jim Perry; 19 Bill Pleis; 30 Garry Roggenburk; 25 Dwight Siebler; 18 Dick Stigman; 15 Al Worthington	Catchers: 10 Earl Battey; 20,25,41 John Sevcik; 22 Jerry Zimmerman; Infielders: 8 Bernie Allen; 3 Harmon Killebrew; 16 Jerry Kindall; 11 Frank Kostro; 5 Don Mincher; 11 Frank Quilici; 13 Rich Reese; 9 Rich Rollins; 12 César Tovar; 2 Zoilo Versalles	Outfielders: 4 Bob Allison; 7 Jimmie Hall; 8 Andy Kosco; 24 Joe Nossek; 6 Tony Oliva; 34 Ted Uhlaender; 47,28 Sandy Valdespino	Manager: 14 Sam Mele; Coaches: 52 Jim Lemon; 1 Billy Martin; 51 Hal Naragon; 53 Johnny Sain

== Player stats ==
= Indicates team leader

= Indicates league leader

=== Batting ===
==== Starters by position ====
Note: Pos = Position; G = Games played; AB = At bats; R = Runs; H = Hits; 2B = Doubles; 3B = Triples; Avg. = Batting average; HR = Home runs; RBI = Runs batted in

Pos	Player	G	AB	R	H	2B	3B	Avg.	HR	RBI
C	Earl Battey	131	394	36	117	22	2	.297	6	60
1B	Don Mincher	128	346	43	87	17	3	.251	22	65
2B	Jerry Kindall	125	342	41	67	12	1	.196	6	36
3B	Rich Rollins	140	469	59	117	22	1	.249	5	32
SS	Zoilo Versalles	160	666	126	182	45	12	.285	20	86
LF	Bob Allison	135	438	71	102	14	5	.233	23	78
CF	Jimmie Hall	148	522	81	149	25	4	.273	19	77
RF	Tony Oliva	149	576	107	185	40	5	.321	16	98

==== Other batters ====
Note: G = Games played; AB = At bats; H = Hits; Avg. = Batting average; HR = Home runs; RBI = Runs batted in

Player	G	AB	H	Avg.	HR	RBI
Harmon Killebrew	113	401	108	.269	25	75
Sandy Valdespino	108	245	64	.261	1	22
Joe Nossek	87	170	37	.218	2	16
Jerry Zimmerman	83	154	33	.214	1	11
Frank Quilici	56	149	31	.208	0	7
Andy Kosco	23	55	13	.236	1	6
Bernie Allen	19	39	9	.231	0	6
Frank Kostro	20	31	5	.161	0	1
César Tovar	18	25	5	.200	0	2
Ted Uhlaender	13	22	4	.182	0	1
John Sevcik	12	16	1	.063	0	0
Rich Reese	14	7	2	.286	0	0

=== Pitching ===
= Indicates league leader

==== Starting pitchers ====
Note: G = Games pitched; IP = Innings pitched; W = Wins; L = Losses; ERA = Earned run average; SO = Strikeouts

Player	G	IP	W	L	ERA	SO
Mudcat Grant	41	270.1	21	7	3.30	142
Jim Kaat	45	264.1	18	11	2.83	154
Jim Perry	36	167.2	12	7	2.63	88
Camilo Pascual	27	156.0	9	3	3.35	96

==== Other pitchers ====
Note: G = Games pitched; IP = Innings pitched; W = Wins; L = Losses; ERA = Earned run average; SO = Strikeouts

Player	G	IP	W	L	ERA	SO
Dave Boswell	27	106.0	6	5	3.40	85
Jim Merritt	16	76.2	5	4	3.17	61
Dick Stigman	33	70.0	4	2	4.37	70
Dwight Siebler	7	15.0	0	0	4.20	15

==== Relief pitchers ====
Note: G = Games pitched; W = Wins; L = Losses; SV = Saves; ERA = Earned run average; SO = Strikeouts

Player	G	W	L	SV	ERA	SO
Al Worthington	62	10	7	21	2.13	59
Johnny Klippstein	56	9	3	5	2.24	59
Bill Pleis	41	4	4	4	2.98	33
Jerry Fosnow	29	3	3	2	4.44	35
Mel Nelson	28	0	4	3	4.12	31
Garry Roggenburk	12	1	0	2	3.43	6
Pete Cimino	1	0	0	0	0.00	0

== Awards and honors ==
- Zoilo Versalles, Shortstop, American League MVP
- Sam Mele, Associated Press AL Manager of the Year

== Farm system ==
Level	Team	League	Manager
AAA	Denver Bears	Pacific Coast League	Cal Ermer
AA	Charlotte Hornets	Southern League	Al Evans
A	Wilson Tobs	Carolina League	Vern Morgan
A	Orlando Twins	Florida State League	Harry Warner
A	Wisconsin Rapids Twins	Midwest League	Ray Bellino and Pete Appleton
A	Thomasville Hi-Toms	Western Carolinas League	Ralph Rowe
A-Short Season	St. Cloud Rox	Northern League	Jim Rantz
Rookie	FRL Twins	Florida Rookie League	Fred Waters

LEAGUE CHAMPIONS: St. Cloud
