= Chuck Hinton =

American baseball player (1934–2013)

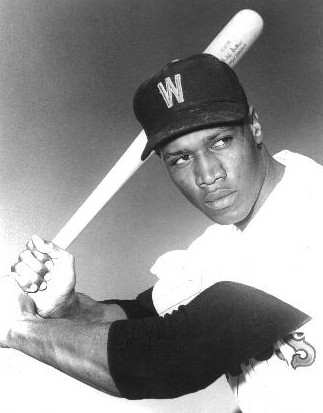
- Hinton in 1962
- Outfielder
- Born: May 3, 1934; Rocky Mount, North Carolina, U.S.
- Died: January 27, 2013 (aged 78); Washington, D.C., U.S.
- Batted: Right Threw: Right

MLB debut
- May 14, 1961, for the Washington Senators

Last MLB appearance
- September 28, 1971, for the Cleveland Indians

MLB statistics
- Batting average: .264
- Home runs: 113
- Runs batted in: 443
- Stats at Baseball Reference

Teams
- Washington Senators (1961–1964); Cleveland Indians (1965–1967); California Angels (1968); Cleveland Indians (1969–1971)

Career highlights and awards
- All-Star (1964)

Charles Edward Hinton Jr. (May 3, 1934 – January 27, 2013) was an American professional baseball player. An outfielder, Hinton played in Major League Baseball for the Washington Senators (1961–64), Cleveland Indians (1965–67, 1969–71) and California Angels (1968). He batted and threw right-handed and was listed as 6 feet 1 inch (1.85 m) tall and 180 pounds (82 kg).

In an eleven-season career, Hinton posted a .264 batting average with 113 home runs and 443 runs batted in in 1353 games played.

== Playing career ==
Hinton attended Shaw University, where he played baseball, American football, and basketball for the Shaw Bears. He served for two years in the United States Army.

In 1956, Hinton attended a baseball tryout camp, where he signed a contract with the Baltimore Orioles. He won two minor-league batting championships in the Orioles system, playing with the Aberdeen Pheasants of Class C Northern League in 1959 and the Stockton Ports of the Class C California League in 1960. The Orioles promoted Hinton to the Vancouver Mounties of the Class AAA Pacific Coast League during the 1960 season. Afraid they might lose Hinton in the 1960 Major League Baseball (MLB) expansion draft, the Orioles had Hinton fake a shoulder injury during winter league baseball. Despite this, the Washington Senators selected Hinton in the expansion draft.

The Senators optioned Hinton to the Indianapolis Indians of the Class AAA American Association before the regular season began. They promoted Hinton from the minor leagues on May 14, 1961, and he made his MLB debut the next day. He finished the 1961 season with a .260 batting average. In 1962, he had a .310 batting average, good for fourth in the American League, and finished second in stolen bases to Luis Aparicio. Hit in the head with a pitch on September 5, 1963, Hinton was unconscious when he was carried off the field. He returned to the lineup eight days later, but felt limited by symptoms of the concussion. Hinton was named to represent the American League in the 1964 MLB All-Star Game.

After the 1964 season, the Senators traded Hinton to the Cleveland Indians for Bob Chance and Woodie Held. He was dealt to the California Angels for José Cardenal on November 29, 1967. Hinton batted .195 in the 1968 season with the Angels. Just before the 1969 season, the Angels traded Hinton back to the Indians for Lou Johnson. The Indians released Hinton after the 1971 season. In all, Hinton played six years with the Indians.

== Post-playing career ==
From 1972 to 2000, Hinton was head coach for the Howard University baseball team. Hinton led the Bison to their first Mid-Eastern Athletic Conference championship.

In 1982, he founded the Major League Baseball Players Alumni Association (MLBPAA), a non-profit organization that promotes the game of baseball, raises money for charities, inspires and educates youth through positive sport images and protects the dignity of the game through former players.

== Personal ==
Hinton and his wife, Irma, lived in Washington, D.C. They had four children. He died from complications of Parkinson's disease on January 27, 2013.

== Highlights ==
- 1964 American League All-Star
- Two hitting-streaks in 1962 (17 and 15 games)
- Fourth in the 1962 American League batting title (.310), behind Pete Runnels (.326), Mickey Mantle (.321) and Floyd Robinson (.312)
- Three times led the Washington Senators in batting average (1962–64), four times in triples and stolen bases (1961–64), and was the last Senator to hit .300
- His uniform number 32 is honored in the Washington Wall of Stars
