= Larry Brown (infielder) =

American baseball player (1940–2024)

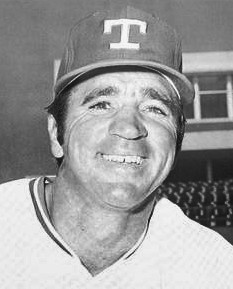
- Brown in 1974
- Infielder
- Born: March 1, 1940; Shinnston, West Virginia, U.S.
- Died: April 13, 2024 (aged 84); Stuart, Florida, U.S.
- Batted: Right Threw: Right

MLB debut
- July 6, 1963, for the Cleveland Indians

Last MLB appearance
- September 29, 1974, for the Texas Rangers

MLB statistics
- Batting average: .233
- Home runs: 47
- Runs batted in: 254
- Stats at Baseball Reference

Teams
- Cleveland Indians (1963–1971); Oakland Athletics (1971–1972); Baltimore Orioles (1973); Texas Rangers (1974)

Larry Leslie Brown (March 1, 1940 – April 13, 2024) was an American professional baseball infielder, who played for the Cleveland Indians, Oakland Athletics, Baltimore Orioles, and Texas Rangers of Major League Baseball (MLB). His brother, Dick Brown, also played in Major League Baseball.

== Career ==
Brown was originally signed by the Indians in 1958, and on July 6, 1963, against the New York Yankees, he made his big league debut at the age of 23. Pinch-hitting for Tito Francona, he struck out in his first at-bat, but he collected a single in his second plate appearance.

As a starter for Cleveland between 1964 and 1969, his batting averages were consistently low – his highest batting average during that span was .253, while his lowest was .227.

On May 4, 1966, Brown was seriously injured after running into Indians teammate Leon Wagner while playing the New York Yankees in Yankee Stadium. Brown suffered a skull fracture and facial injuries and was admitted to the Lenox Hill Hospital. He was on the disabled list for six weeks, returning to the active roster on June 17. He struck out in one plate appearance as a pinch hitter and played second base for two innings late in the game as Cleveland lost to the Yankees in New York.

In 1970, he lost his starting job to a young Jack Heidemann, and on April 24, 1971, he was sold to the Athletics for an estimated $50,000. He would end up hitting below .200 during his time with the Athletics, and in 1973 he was signed by the Orioles. He played only 17 games with them that season, batting .250. He finished his career with the Rangers in 1974. He played his final game on September 29 of that year.

Overall, he hit .233 with 47 career home runs and 254 RBI. Brown ranked in the top 5 in sacrifice hits (1965 and 1967). He also ranked in the top ten in intentional walks in 1968, and because of his good eye at the plate, he ranked in the top ten for best at-bats per strikeout ratio twice (1968 and 1969). His fielding percentage stood at .966.

== Personal life ==
Brown and his wife, Helen, lived in Palm Beach, Florida. He died in Stuart, Florida, on April 13, 2024, at the age of 84.
