= Bob Chance =

American baseball player (1940–2013)

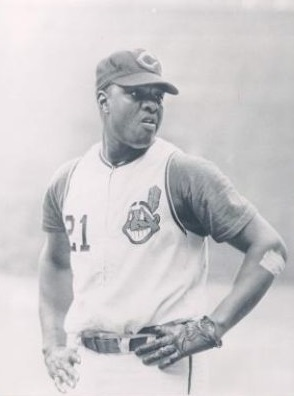
- First baseman / Right fielder
- Born: September 10, 1940; Statesboro, Georgia, U.S.
- Died: October 3, 2013 (aged 73); Charleston, West Virginia, U.S.
- Batted: Left Threw: Right

MLB debut
- September 4, 1963, for the Cleveland Indians

Last MLB appearance
- April 20, 1969, for the California Angels

MLB statistics
- Batting average: .261
- Home runs: 24
- Runs batted in: 112
- Stats at Baseball Reference

Teams
- Cleveland Indians (1963–1964); Washington Senators (1965–1967); California Angels (1969); Sankei/Yakult Atoms (1969–1970)

Robert Chance (September 10, 1940 – October 3, 2013) was an American first baseman and right fielder in Major League Baseball who played for the Cleveland Indians, Washington Senators and California Angels in part of six seasons spanning 1963 through 1969. Listed at 6 feet 2 inches (1.88 m) tall and 215 pounds (98 kg), Chance batted left handed and threw right handed. He was born in Statesboro, Georgia.

His most productive season in 1964 with the Indians, when he batted a .279 average and posted career numbers in hits (109), runs scored (45), home runs (14), RBI (75) and games played (120). Over his MLB career, Chance appeared in 277 games; his 195 hits included 34 doubles, one triple and 24 homers. He knocked in 112 runs.

Additionally, Chance played two seasons in Japan for the Sankei/Yakult Atoms.

In between, Chance played winter ball with the Leones de Ponce of the Puerto Rican League during the 1961-62 season, and for the Cardenales de Lara of the Venezuelan League in 1968-69.

Chance died in 2013 in Charleston, West Virginia at the age of 73.
