= 1964 Washington Senators season =

1964 Washington Senators
- League: American League
- Ballpark: D.C. Stadium
- City: Washington, D.C.
- Record: 62–100 (.383)
- League place: 9th
- Owners: James M. Johnston and James H. Lemon
- General managers: George Selkirk
- Managers: Gil Hodges
- Television: WTOP
- Radio: WTOP (Dan Daniels, John MacLean)

The 1964 Washington Senators season involved the Senators finishing ninth in the American League with a record of 62 wins and 100 losses.

== Offseason ==
- October 14, 1963: Minnie Miñoso was released by the Senators.
- November 30, 1963: Marshall Bridges was purchased by the Senators from the New York Yankees.
- December 2, 1963: Howie Koplitz was drafted by the Senators from the Detroit Tigers in the 1963 rule 5 draft.
- December 6, 1963: Bill Skowron was purchased by the Senators from the Los Angeles Dodgers.
- December 6, 1963: Hobie Landrith was released by the Senators.
- March 31, 1964: The Senators traded a player to be named later to the Baltimore Orioles for Buster Narum. The Senators completed the deal by sending Lou Piniella to Orioles on August 4.

== Regular season ==
=== Season standings ===
American League
Team	W	L	Pct.	GB	Home	Road
New York Yankees	99	63	.611	—	50‍–‍31	49‍–‍32
Chicago White Sox	98	64	.605	1	52‍–‍29	46‍–‍35
Baltimore Orioles	97	65	.599	2	49‍–‍32	48‍–‍33
Detroit Tigers	85	77	.525	14	46‍–‍35	39‍–‍42
Los Angeles Angels	82	80	.506	17	45‍–‍36	37‍–‍44
Cleveland Indians	79	83	.488	20	41‍–‍40	38‍–‍43
Minnesota Twins	79	83	.488	20	40‍–‍41	39‍–‍42
Boston Red Sox	72	90	.444	27	45‍–‍36	27‍–‍54
Washington Senators	62	100	.383	37	31‍–‍50	31‍–‍50
Kansas City Athletics	57	105	.352	42	26‍–‍55	31‍–‍50

=== Record vs. opponents ===
1964 American League record Sources:
Team	BAL	BOS	CWS	CLE	DET	KCA	LAA	MIN	NYY	WAS
Baltimore	—	11–7	10–8	8–10	11–7	13–5–1	11–7	10–8	10–8	13–5
Boston	7–11	—	4–14	9–9	5–13	12–6	9–9	5–13	9–9	12–6
Chicago	8–10	14–4	—	12–6	11–7	16–2	10–8	9–9	6–12	12–6
Cleveland	10–8	9–9	6–12	—	11–7	10–8	9–9	10–8–1	3–15–1	11–7
Detroit	7–11	13–5	7–11	7–11	—	11–7	10–8	11–7	8–10–1	11–7
Kansas City	5–13–1	6–12	2–16	8–10	7–11	—	6–12	9–9	6–12	8–10
Los Angeles	7–11	9–9	8–10	9–9	8–10	12–6	—	12–6	7–11	10–8
Minnesota	8–10	13–5	9–9	8–10–1	7–11	9–9	6–12	—	8–10	11–7
New York	8–10	9–9	12–6	15–3–1	10–8–1	12–6	11–7	10–8	—	12–6
Washington	5–13	6–12	6–12	7–11	7–11	10–8	8–10	7–11	6–12	—

=== Notable transactions ===
- July 13, 1964: Bill Skowron and Carl Bouldin were traded by the Senators to the Chicago White Sox for Joe Cunningham and a player to be named later. The White Sox completed the deal by sending Frank Kreutzer to the Senators on July 28.

=== Roster ===
1964 Washington Senators
Roster
Pitchers: 18 Carl Bouldin; 25 Marshall Bridges; 37 Jim Bronstad; 20 Tom Cheney; 25 Pete Craig; 21 Bennie Daniels; 17 Jim Duckworth; 19 Jim Hannan; 27 Ron Kline; 26 Alan Koch; 16 Howie Koplitz; 18 Frank Kreutzer; 16 Don Loun; 34 Buster Narum; 24 Claude Osteen; 28 Steve Ridzik; 37 Ed Roebuck; 33 Don Rudolph; 15 Dave Stenhouse	Catchers: 8 Mike Brumley; 10 Don Leppert; 9,20 Ken Retzer; Infielders: 1 Don Blasingame; 11 Ed Brinkman; 7 Chuck Cottier; 3 Joe Cunningham; 2 John Kennedy; 29 Dick Phillips; 9 Roy Sievers; 3 Bill Skowron; 23 Don Zimmer	Outfielders: 32 Chuck Hinton; 6,12 Ken Hunt; 30 Jim King; 6 Willie Kirkland; 4 Don Lock; 5 Fred Valentine	Manager: 14 Gil Hodges; Coaches: 40 Sid Hudson; 44 Hobie Landrith; 41 Danny O'Connell; 43 George Susce; 42 Eddie Yost

== Player stats ==
= Indicates team leader

=== Batting ===
==== Starters by position ====
Note: Pos = Position; G = Games played; AB = At bats; H = Hits; Avg. = Batting average; HR = Home runs; RBI = Runs batted in

Pos	Player	G	AB	H	Avg.	HR	RBI
C	Mike Brumley	136	426	104	.244	2	35
1B	Bill Skowron	73	262	71	.271	13	41
2B	Don Blasingame	143	506	135	.267	1	34
3B	John Kennedy	148	482	111	.230	7	35
SS	Ed Brinkman	132	447	100	.224	8	34
LF	Chuck Hinton	138	514	141	.274	11	53
CF	Don Lock	152	512	127	.248	28	80
RF	Jim King	134	415	100	.241	18	56

==== Other batters ====
Note: G = Games played; AB = At bats; H = Hits; Avg. = Batting average; HR = Home runs; RBI = Runs batted in

Player	G	AB	H	Avg.	HR	RBI
Don Zimmer	121	341	84	.246	12	38
Dick Phillips	109	234	54	.231	2	23
Fred Valentine	102	212	48	.226	4	20
Chuck Cottier	73	137	23	.168	3	10
Joe Cunningham	49	126	27	.214	0	7
Don Leppert	50	122	19	.156	3	12
Willie Kirkland	32	102	22	.216	5	13
Ken Hunt	51	96	13	.135	1	4
Roy Sievers	33	58	10	.172	4	11
Ken Retzer	17	32	3	.094	0	1

=== Pitching ===
==== Starting pitchers ====
Note: G = Games pitched; IP = Innings pitched; W = Wins; L = Losses; ERA = Earned run average; SO = Strikeouts

Player	G	IP	W	L	ERA	SO
Claude Osteen	37	257.0	15	13	3.33	133
Buster Narum	38	199.0	9	15	4.30	121
Bennie Daniels	33	163.0	8	10	3.70	73
Don Loun	2	13.0	1	1	2.08	3

==== Other pitchers ====
Note: G = Games pitched; IP = Innings pitched; W = Wins; L = Losses; ERA = Earned run average; SO = Strikeouts

Player	G	IP	W	L	ERA	SO
Alan Koch	32	114.0	3	10	4.89	67
Dave Stenhouse	26	88.0	2	7	4.81	44
Don Rudolph	28	70.1	1	3	4.09	32
Tom Cheney	15	48.2	1	3	3.70	25
Frank Kreutzer	13	45.1	2	6	4.76	27
Carl Bouldin	9	25.0	0	3	5.40	12
Howie Koplitz	6	17.0	0	0	4.76	9
Pete Craig	2	1.2	0	0	48.60	0

==== Relief pitchers ====
Note: G = Games pitched; W = Wins; L = Losses; SV = Saves; ERA = Earned run average; SO = Strikeouts

Player	G	W	L	SV	ERA	SO
Ron Kline	61	10	7	14	2.32	40
Steve Ridzik	49	5	5	2	2.89	60
Jim Hannan	49	4	7	3	4.16	67
Jim Duckworth	30	1	6	3	4.34	56
Marshall Bridges	17	0	3	2	5.70	16
Jim Bronstad	4	0	1	0	5.14	9
Ed Roebuck	2	0	0	0	9.00	0

== Farm system ==
Level	Team	League	Manager
AAA	Toronto Maple Leafs	International League	Sparky Anderson
AA	York White Roses	Eastern League	Jim Lemon
A	Rocky Mount Senators	Carolina League	Owen Friend
A	Geneva Senators	New York–Penn League	Wayne Terwilliger

Toronto affiliation shared with Milwaukee Braves
