= 1964 Chicago White Sox season =

1964 Chicago White Sox
- League: American League
- Ballpark: White Sox Park
- City: Chicago
- Record: 98–64 (.605)
- League place: 2nd
- Owners: Arthur Allyn, Jr., John Allyn
- General managers: Ed Short
- Managers: Al López
- Television: WGN-TV (Jack Brickhouse, Vince Lloyd)
- Radio: WCFL (Bob Elson, Milo Hamilton)

The 1964 Chicago White Sox season was the team's 64th season in the major leagues, and its 65th season overall. They finished with a record of 98–64, good enough for second place in the American League, just one game behind the first-place New York Yankees.

== Offseason ==
- December 2, 1963: Rudy May was drafted by the White Sox from the Minnesota Twins in the 1963 first-year draft.
- February 25, 1964: Jim Brosnan was released by the White Sox.
- March 18, 1964: Don Mossi was purchased by the White Sox from the Detroit Tigers.

== Regular season ==
=== Notable transactions ===
- April 8, 1964: Minnie Miñoso was signed as a free agent by the White Sox.
- April 23, 1964: Charley Smith was traded by the White Sox to the New York Mets for Chico Fernández, Bobby Catton (minors), and cash.
- July 13, 1964: Joe Cunningham and a player to be named later were traded by the White Sox to the Washington Senators for Bill Skowron and Carl Bouldin. The White Sox completed the deal by sending Frank Kreutzer to the Senators on July 28.
- July 17, 1964: Minnie Miñoso was released by the White Sox.

=== Opening Day lineup ===
- Jim Landis, CF
- Don Buford, 2B
- Floyd Robinson, RF
- Dave Nicholson, LF
- Joe Cunningham, 1B
- Ron Hansen, SS
- Charley Smith, 3B
- J. C. Martin, C
- Gary Peters, P

The White Sox could have won the American League flag in 1964. That year saw a great pennant race in the American League, with the New York Yankees finishing first by winning 99 games, the Sox only one game behind with 98, and the Baltimore Orioles third with 97, only one game behind the Sox.

A key statistic is that the Sox were a woeful 6–12 against the Yankees that year, so literally if the Sox had just won one of those 12 losses against the Bombers, the Sox would have finished first.

A 4–3 loss on June 14 could have been that victory, as the Sox were up 3–1 at Yankee Stadium in the ninth inning of the second game of a doubleheader, but the Yanks made a comeback and won in the tenth inning with future Hall of Fame reliever Hoyt Wilhelm taking the loss in relief. In the first game, Sox star pitcher Juan Pizarro was expected to beat Yankee bottom of the barrel spot-starter and journeyman Bud Daley, but the Yanks won that one, too.

Another heartbreaker was a 1–0 loss to the Yankees on June 20, a game that had been scoreless until the 11th inning, when the New Yorkers finally pushed a run across when with two outs, Elston Howard drove in Pedro Gonzales, who was pinch running for Mickey Mantle.

Then the very next day, the Sox lost to the Yankees again 2–1 in a game that went an incredible 17 innings.

A day later, the Sox lost another one-run game to the Yanks. This time the Sox scored five runs, but ended up losing 6–5. Any one of those games could have been a pennant-winning victory.

The Sox were generally a light-hitting club, with a team batting average of .247, good only for sixth in the ten-team American League. But their pitching was great. They ranked first in the league in shutouts, walks, and in fewest hits, runs, earned runs, and walks given up.

Outfielder Jim Landis, a veteran of the 1959 pennant winners, said that there was even more of a feeling on the 1964 club than on the 1959 club that the Sox were going to win, because the '64 squad had better pitching.

The Sox were in first place as late as September 6, and only ½ game back two weeks before the end of the season before the Yanks made their move. The Sox had a strong September at 18–10, but the Yanks were even better, winning 21 of 25.

By the end of the season, leading off was centerfielder Mike Hershberger, who batted .230 that year. Hershberger despite his light hitting, would be a starter with the Sox and the Kansas City and Oakland A's for seven straight years.

Batting second was the Sox' leading hitter, right fielder Floyd Robinson, who batted .301 in 1964 and got some votes for MVP. Two years earlier, he had led the league with 45 doubles.

Next was shortstop Ron Hansen. Known as a good-field, no stick type of guy in later years, Hansen had his best batting average of his career in 1964 with a .261 average, so Manager Al Lopez had him batting third, and sometimes even cleanup earlier in the season. Hansen got a few votes for MVP that year too.

Veteran first baseman Bill Skowron was the Sox' cleanup hitter. The Sox got him from the Washington Senators that July, and Skowron gave the Sox some needed pop by batting .293 since the trade.

Next was Pete Ward, the Sox' Steady Eddy at third base. He batted .282 and was a slick fielder, so he got some MVP votes that year too.

Young Tom McCraw in only his second year in the bigs was the Sox' left fielder and sixth-place hitter. He batted .261 that year.

Al Weis became the Sox' second baseman that year after Nellie Fox was traded in the offseason. He batted a respectable .247 and established career highs with 81 hits and 22 stolen bases, a theft total second in the American League. Weis is better known for his later time with the New York Mets, and he would later get the game-winning RBI in game 2 of the 1969 World Series.

Not too well remembered was Sox catcher Camilo Carreon, who batted eighth. Carreon played only 37 games in the 1964 regular season with J.C. Martin doing most of the backstop duties that year, but Carreon played a lot down the stretch.

Sox 1964 starting pitchers were Gary Peters, Juan Pizarro, Joel Horlen, and John Buzhardt, and the team's top relievers were future National Baseball Hall of Fame member Hoyt Wilhelm, and Eddie Fisher.

=== Season standings ===
American League
Team	W	L	Pct.	GB	Home	Road
New York Yankees	99	63	.611	—	50‍–‍31	49‍–‍32
Chicago White Sox	98	64	.605	1	52‍–‍29	46‍–‍35
Baltimore Orioles	97	65	.599	2	49‍–‍32	48‍–‍33
Detroit Tigers	85	77	.525	14	46‍–‍35	39‍–‍42
Los Angeles Angels	82	80	.506	17	45‍–‍36	37‍–‍44
Cleveland Indians	79	83	.488	20	41‍–‍40	38‍–‍43
Minnesota Twins	79	83	.488	20	40‍–‍41	39‍–‍42
Boston Red Sox	72	90	.444	27	45‍–‍36	27‍–‍54
Washington Senators	62	100	.383	37	31‍–‍50	31‍–‍50
Kansas City Athletics	57	105	.352	42	26‍–‍55	31‍–‍50

=== Record vs. opponents ===
1964 American League record Sources:
Team	BAL	BOS	CWS	CLE	DET	KCA	LAA	MIN	NYY	WAS
Baltimore	—	11–7	10–8	8–10	11–7	13–5–1	11–7	10–8	10–8	13–5
Boston	7–11	—	4–14	9–9	5–13	12–6	9–9	5–13	9–9	12–6
Chicago	8–10	14–4	—	12–6	11–7	16–2	10–8	9–9	6–12	12–6
Cleveland	10–8	9–9	6–12	—	11–7	10–8	9–9	10–8–1	3–15–1	11–7
Detroit	7–11	13–5	7–11	7–11	—	11–7	10–8	11–7	8–10–1	11–7
Kansas City	5–13–1	6–12	2–16	8–10	7–11	—	6–12	9–9	6–12	8–10
Los Angeles	7–11	9–9	8–10	9–9	8–10	12–6	—	12–6	7–11	10–8
Minnesota	8–10	13–5	9–9	8–10–1	7–11	9–9	6–12	—	8–10	11–7
New York	8–10	9–9	12–6	15–3–1	10–8–1	12–6	11–7	10–8	—	12–6
Washington	5–13	6–12	6–12	7–11	7–11	10–8	8–10	7–11	6–12	—

=== Roster ===
1964 Chicago White Sox
Roster
Pitchers: 18 Fritz Ackley; 38 Frank Baumann; 30 John Buzhardt; 28 Eddie Fisher; 21 Ray Herbert; 20 Joe Horlen; 19 Bruce Howard; 29,49 Frank Kreutzer; 41 Don Mossi; 43 Gary Peters; 32 Juan Pizarro; 35 Fred Talbot; 31 Hoyt Wilhelm	Catchers: 45 Cam Carreon; 12 J. C. Martin; 15 Jerry McNertney; Infielders: 24 Don Buford; 5 Joe Cunningham; 4 Ron Hansen; 18 Jeoff Long; 14 Tommy McCraw; 5 Bill Skowron; 27 Charley Smith; 8 Pete Ward; 6 Al Weis	Outfielders: 17 Ken Berry; 40 Mike Hershberger; 1 Jim Landis; 9 Minnie Miñoso; 11 Dave Nicholson; 3 Floyd Robinson; 26 Gene Stephens; Other batters: 49 Smoky Burgess; 44 Jim Hicks; 23 Dick Kenworthy; 7 Charlie Maxwell; 29 Marv Staehle	Manager: 10 Al López; Coaches: 37 Ray Berres; 34 Johnny Cooney; 33 Tony Cuccinello; 39 Don Gutteridge

== Player stats ==
=== Batting ===
Note: G = Games played; AB = At bats; R = Runs scored; H = Hits; 2B = Doubles; 3B = Triples; HR = Home runs; RBI = Runs batted in; BB = Base on balls; SO = Strikeouts; AVG = Batting average; SB = Stolen bases

Player	G	AB	R	H	2B	3B	HR	RBI	BB	SO	AVG	SB
Ken Berry, CF	12	32	4	12	1	0	1	4	5	3	.375	0
Don Buford, 2B, 3B	135	442	62	116	14	6	4	30	46	62	.262	12
Smoky Burgess, PH	7	5	1	1	0	0	1	1	2	0	.200	0
Cam Carreon, C	37	95	12	26	5	0	0	4	7	13	.274	0
Joe Cunningham, 1B	40	108	13	27	7	0	0	10	14	15	.250	0
Ron Hansen, SS	158	575	85	150	25	3	20	68	73	73	.261	1
Mike Hershberger, RF, CF	141	452	55	104	15	3	2	31	48	47	.230	8
Jim Hicks, PR	2	0	0	0	0	0	0	0	0	0	.000	0
Dick Kenworthy, PH	2	2	0	0	0	0	0	0	0	1	.000	0
Jim Landis, CF	106	298	30	62	8	4	1	18	36	64	.208	5
Jeoff Long, LF, 1B	23	35	0	5	0	0	0	5	4	15	.143	0
J. C. Martin, C	122	294	23	58	10	1	4	22	16	30	.197	0
Charlie Maxwell, PH	2	2	0	0	0	0	0	0	0	0	.000	0
Tommy McCraw, 1B, OF	125	368	47	96	11	5	6	36	32	65	.261	15
Jerry McNertney, C	73	186	16	40	5	0	3	23	19	24	.215	0
Minnie Miñoso, LF	30	31	4	7	0	0	1	5	5	3	.226	0
Dave Nicholson, LF	97	294	40	60	6	1	13	39	52	126	.204	0
Floyd Robinson, RF, LF	141	525	83	158	17	3	11	59	70	41	.301	9
Bill Skowron, 1B	73	273	19	80	11	3	4	38	19	36	.293	0
Charley Smith, 3B	2	7	1	1	0	1	0	0	1	1	.143	0
Marv Staehle, PH	6	5	0	2	0	0	0	2	0	0	.400	1
Gene Stephens, OF	82	141	21	33	4	2	3	17	21	28	.234	1
Pete Ward, 3B	144	539	61	152	28	3	23	94	56	76	.282	1
Al Weis, 2B, SS	133	328	36	81	4	4	2	23	22	41	.247	22

Player	G	AB	R	H	2B	3B	HR	RBI	BB	SO	AVG	SB
Fritz Ackley, P	3	1	0	1	1	0	0	1	1	0	1.000	0
Frank Baumann, P	22	4	0	0	0	0	0	0	0	4	.000	0
John Buzhardt, P	31	54	3	11	1	1	0	6	2	22	.204	0
Eddie Fisher, P	59	18	0	3	0	0	0	1	0	6	.167	0
Ray Herbert, P	20	36	2	5	0	0	0	3	1	10	.139	0
Joe Horlen, P	32	69	2	11	0	0	0	5	2	11	.159	0
Bruce Howard, P	3	8	0	0	0	0	0	0	0	4	.000	0
Frank Kreutzer, P	17	8	0	1	1	0	0	1	0	3	.125	0
Don Mossi, P	34	6	0	1	0	0	0	0	0	2	.167	0
Gary Peters, P	54	120	9	25	7	0	4	19	2	29	.208	0
Juan Pizarro, P	33	90	6	19	1	0	3	15	1	34	.211	0
Fred Talbot, P	18	19	5	5	2	0	0	3	4	6	.263	0
Hoyt Wilhelm, P	73	21	2	3	0	0	0	3	1	7	.143	0
Team totals	162	5491	642	1356	184	40	106	586	562	902	.247	75

=== Pitching ===
Note: W = Wins; L = Losses; ERA = Earned run average; G = Games pitched; GS = Games started; SV = Saves; IP = Innings pitched; H = Hits allowed; R = Runs allowed; ER = Earned runs allowed; HR = Home runs allowed; BB = Walks allowed; K = Strikeouts

Player	W	L	ERA	G	GS	SV	IP	H	R	ER	HR	BB	K
Fritz Ackley	0	0	8.53	3	2	0	6.1	10	6	6	2	4	6
Frank Baumann	0	3	6.19	22	0	1	32.0	40	22	22	4	24	19
John Buzhardt	10	8	2.98	31	25	0	160.0	150	60	53	13	39	97
Eddie Fisher	6	3	3.02	59	2	9	125.0	86	43	42	13	35	74
Ray Herbert	6	7	3.47	20	19	0	111.2	117	50	43	14	19	40
Joe Horlen	13	9	1.88	32	28	0	210.2	142	54	44	11	59	138
Bruce Howard	2	1	0.81	3	3	0	22.1	10	2	2	0	9	17
Frank Kreutzer	3	1	3.35	17	2	1	40.1	37	15	15	1	21	32
Don Mossi	3	1	2.93	34	0	7	40.0	37	16	13	9	9	36
Gary Peters	20	8	2.50	37	36	0	273.2	217	89	76	20	113	205
Juan Pizarro	19	9	2.56	33	33	0	239.0	193	78	68	23	60	162
Fred Talbot	4	5	3.70	17	12	0	75.1	83	31	31	7	20	34
Hoyt Wilhelm	12	9	1.99	73	0	27	131.1	94	35	29	7	31	95
Team totals	98	64	2.72	162	162	45	1467.2	1216	501	444	124	443	955

== Farm system ==
Level	Team	League	Manager
AAA	Indianapolis Indians	Pacific Coast League	Les Moss
AA	Lynchburg White Sox	Southern League	George Noga
A	Tidewater Tides	Carolina League	Allen Jones
A	Sarasota Sun Sox	Florida State League	Ira Hutchinson
A	Clinton C-Sox	Midwest League	Don Bacon and Hugh Mulcahy
Rookie	SRL White Sox	Sarasota Rookie League	Frank Parenti

LEAGUE CHAMPIONS: Lynchburg
