= Shifflett =

Shifflett is a surname. Notable people with the surname include:

- Alexis Shifflett (born 1996), American sitting volleyball player
- Garland Shifflett (1935–2020), American baseball player
- John Shifflett (1953–2017), American jazz musician
- Steve Shifflett (born 1966), American baseball player
