= 1964 Boston Red Sox season =

Major League Baseball season

1964 Boston Red Sox
- League: American League
- Ballpark: Fenway Park
- City: Boston, Massachusetts
- Record: 72–90 (.444)
- League place: 8th
- Owners: Tom Yawkey
- President: Tom Yawkey
- General managers: Pinky Higgins
- Managers: Johnny Pesky (70–90); Billy Herman (2–0)
- Television: WHDH-TV, Ch. 5
- Radio: WHDH-AM 850 (Curt Gowdy, Ned Martin, Art Gleeson)
- Stats: ESPN.com; Baseball Reference

The 1964 Boston Red Sox season was the 64th season in the franchise's Major League Baseball history. The Red Sox finished eighth in the American League (AL) with a record of 72 wins and 90 losses, 27 games behind the AL champion New York Yankees. The Red Sox attracted 883,276 fans to Fenway Park, fifth in the Junior Circuit and 11th in MLB, reflecting a six percent turnstile decline from 1963.

Former Boston infielder Johnny Pesky, in his second season as manager, led the team to a 70–90 mark before he was dismissed on October 1. Third-base coach Billy Herman, 55, succeeded Pesky; he signed a two-year contract and directed the Red Sox to two victories in the season's final two games.

== Offseason ==
- October 14, 1963: The Red Sox release veteran right-hander Bob Turley and appoint him their pitching coach for 1964, replacing Harry Dorish. Earlier in October, the Red Sox had released infielder Billy Gardner (October 2) and left-hander Chet Nichols Jr. (October 4).
- February 4, 1964: Third baseman Carmen Fanzone is signed as an amateur free agent by the Red Sox.
- Prior to 1964 season: Outfielder Bobby Gene Smith is released by the Red Sox.

== Regular season ==
=== Season standings ===
American League
Team	W	L	Pct.	GB	Home	Road
New York Yankees	99	63	.611	—	50‍–‍31	49‍–‍32
Chicago White Sox	98	64	.605	1	52‍–‍29	46‍–‍35
Baltimore Orioles	97	65	.599	2	49‍–‍32	48‍–‍33
Detroit Tigers	85	77	.525	14	46‍–‍35	39‍–‍42
Los Angeles Angels	82	80	.506	17	45‍–‍36	37‍–‍44
Cleveland Indians	79	83	.488	20	41‍–‍40	38‍–‍43
Minnesota Twins	79	83	.488	20	40‍–‍41	39‍–‍42
Boston Red Sox	72	90	.444	27	45‍–‍36	27‍–‍54
Washington Senators	62	100	.383	37	31‍–‍50	31‍–‍50
Kansas City Athletics	57	105	.352	42	26‍–‍55	31‍–‍50

=== Record vs. opponents ===
1964 American League record Sources:
Team	BAL	BOS	CWS	CLE	DET	KCA	LAA	MIN	NYY	WAS
Baltimore	—	11–7	10–8	8–10	11–7	13–5–1	11–7	10–8	10–8	13–5
Boston	7–11	—	4–14	9–9	5–13	12–6	9–9	5–13	9–9	12–6
Chicago	8–10	14–4	—	12–6	11–7	16–2	10–8	9–9	6–12	12–6
Cleveland	10–8	9–9	6–12	—	11–7	10–8	9–9	10–8–1	3–15–1	11–7
Detroit	7–11	13–5	7–11	7–11	—	11–7	10–8	11–7	8–10–1	11–7
Kansas City	5–13–1	6–12	2–16	8–10	7–11	—	6–12	9–9	6–12	8–10
Los Angeles	7–11	9–9	8–10	9–9	8–10	12–6	—	12–6	7–11	10–8
Minnesota	8–10	13–5	9–9	8–10–1	7–11	9–9	6–12	—	8–10	11–7
New York	8–10	9–9	12–6	15–3–1	10–8–1	12–6	11–7	10–8	—	12–6
Washington	5–13	6–12	6–12	7–11	7–11	10–8	8–10	7–11	6–12	—

=== Opening Day lineup ===
2	Chuck Schilling	2B
1	Ed Bressoud	SS
8	Carl Yastrzemski	LF
11	Frank Malzone	3B
7	Dick Stuart	1B
6	Lou Clinton	RF
25	Tony Conigliaro	CF
10	Bob Tillman	C
27	Bill Monbouquette	P

=== Notable transactions ===
- April 21, 1964: The Red Sox release veteran right-handed starting pitcher Gene Conley, 33.
- June 4, 1964: The Red Sox trade outfielder Lou Clinton, 26, to the Los Angeles Angels for outfielder/first baseman Lee Thomas, 28.
- August 5, 1964: The Red Sox sign free-agent outfielder Al Smith, 36, released today by the Cleveland Indians.
- September 6, 1964: Left-hander Wilbur Wood, 22, is purchased from the Red Sox by the Pittsburgh Pirates.

=== Roster ===
1964 Boston Red Sox
Roster
Pitchers: 15 Pete Charton; 29 Ed Connolly; 21 Arnold Earley; 24 Dave Gray; 20 Bob Heffner; 36 Jack Lamabe; 27 Bill Monbouquette; 23 Dave Morehead; 17 Dick Radatz; 19 Jay Ritchie; 14 Bill Spanswick; 26 Earl Wilson; 19 Wilbur Wood	Catchers: 5 Russ Nixon; 40 Mike Ryan; 10 Bob Tillman; Infielders: 1 Ed Bressoud; 51 Bobby Guindon; 39 Dalton Jones; 11 Frank Malzone; 2 Chuck Schilling; 28 Al Smith; 7 Dick Stuart; 16 Dick Williams	Outfielders: 6 Lou Clinton; 25 Tony Conigliaro; 3 Gary Geiger; 30 Tony Horton; 12 Félix Mantilla; 4 Román Mejías; 6 Lee Thomas; 8 Carl Yastrzemski	Managers: 35 Billy Herman; 22 Johnny Pesky; Coaches: 35 Billy Herman (Third base); 33 Al Lakeman (Bullpen); 32 Harry Malmberg (First base); 34 Bob Turley (Pitching)

== Player stats ==
= Indicates team leader

=== Batting ===
==== Starters by position ====
Note: Pos = Position; G = Games played; AB = At bats; H = Hits; Avg. = Batting average; HR = Home runs; RBI = Runs batted in

Pos	Player	G	AB	H	Avg.	HR	RBI
C	Bob Tillman	131	425	118	.278	17	61
1B	Dick Stuart	156	603	168	.279	33	114
2B	Dalton Jones	118	374	86	.230	6	39
3B	Frank Malzone	148	537	142	.264	13	56
SS	Ed Bressoud	158	566	166	.293	15	55
LF	Tony Conigliaro	111	404	117	.290	24	52
CF	Carl Yastrzemski	151	567	164	.289	15	67
RF	Lee Thomas	107	401	103	.257	13	42

==== Other batters ====
Note: G = Games played; AB = At bats; H = Hits; Avg. = Batting average; HR = Home runs; RBI = Runs batted in

Player	G	AB	H	Avg.	HR	RBI
Felix Mantilla	133	425	123	.289	30	64
Russ Nixon	81	163	38	.233	1	20
Chuck Schilling	47	163	32	.196	0	7
Tony Horton	36	126	28	.222	1	8
Lou Clinton	37	120	31	.258	3	6
Roman Mejias	62	101	24	.238	2	4
Dick Williams	61	69	11	.159	5	11
Al Smith	29	51	11	.216	2	7
Gary Geiger	5	15	5	.385	0	1
Bobby Guindon	5	8	1	.125	0	0
Mike Ryan	1	3	1	.333	0	2

=== Pitching ===
= Indicates league leader

==== Starting pitchers ====
Note: G = Games pitched; IP = Innings pitched; W = Wins; L = Losses; ERA = Earned run average; SO = Strikeouts

Player	G	IP	W	L	ERA	SO
Bill Monbouquette	36	234.0	13	14	4.04	120
Earl Wilson	33	202.1	11	12	4.49	166
Dave Morehead	31	166.2	8	15	4.97	139

==== Other pitchers ====
Note: G = Games pitched; IP = Innings pitched; W = Wins; L = Losses; ERA = Earned run average; SO = Strikeouts

Player	G	IP	W	L	ERA	SO
Jack Lamabe	39	177.1	9	13	5.89	109
Bob Heffner	55	158.2	7	9	4.08	112
Ed Connolly	27	80.2	4	11	4.91	73
Bill Spanswick	29	65.1	2	3	6.89	55
Pete Charton	25	65.0	0	2	5.26	37

==== Relief pitchers ====
Note: G = Games pitched; W = Wins; L = Losses; SV = Saves; ERA = Earned run average; SO = Strikeouts

Player	G	W	L	SV	ERA	SO
Dick Radatz	79	16	9	29	2.29	181
Arnold Earley	25	1	1	1	2.68	45
Jay Ritchie	21	1	1	0	2.74	35
Dave Gray	9	0	0	0	9.00	17
Wilbur Wood	4	0	0	0	17.47	5

== Farm system ==
Level	Team	League	Manager
AAA	Seattle Rainiers	Pacific Coast League	Edo Vanni
AA	Reading Red Sox	Eastern League	Eddie Popowski
A	Winston-Salem Red Sox	Carolina League	Bill Slack
A	Waterloo Hawks	Midwest League	Matt Sczesny
A	Wellsville Red Sox	New York–Penn League	Larry Lee Thomas
A	Statesville Colts	Western Carolinas League	Dave Philley and Rudy York

Statesville affiliation shared with the Houston Colt .45s
