= Loun =

Loun may refer to:

- Loun language
- Don Loun, baseball pitcher
- Loun Srdanovic (born 2006), Swiss footballer
