= George Strickland (baseball) =

American baseball player and manager (1926–2010)

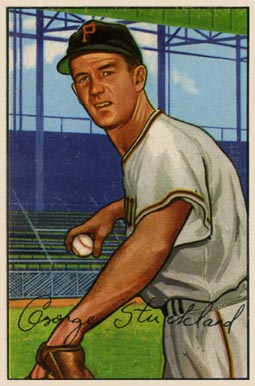
- Shortstop / Manager
- Born: January 10, 1926; New Orleans, Louisiana, U.S.
- Died: February 21, 2010 (aged 84); New Orleans, Louisiana, U.S.
- Batted: Right Threw: Right

MLB debut
- May 7, 1950, for the Pittsburgh Pirates

Last MLB appearance
- July 23, 1960, for the Cleveland Indians

MLB statistics
- Batting average: .224
- Home runs: 36
- Runs batted in: 284
- Managerial record: 48–63
- Winning %: .432
- Stats at Baseball Reference

Teams
- As player: Pittsburgh Pirates (1950–1952); Cleveland Indians (1952–1957, 1959–1960); As manager: Cleveland Indians (1964, 1966)

George Bevan "Bo" Strickland (January 10, 1926 – February 21, 2010) was an American professional baseball player and manager who spent ten seasons from 1950 to 1960 as an infielder in Major League Baseball (MLB) with the Pittsburgh Pirates and Cleveland Indians. He served as the Indians' interim manager twice in the 1960s. He was also a cousin of Hal Bevan.

== Playing career ==
=== Prior to the majors ===
Strickland was born in New Orleans, Louisiana on January 10, 1926. He was a star shortstop at the city's S.J. Peters High School, where one of his teammates was Mel Parnell. Strickland also played for the Southwest Sectional champions representing his hometown at the American Legion Baseball World Series in Miles City, Montana in 1943. Immediately after the tournament, he signed with the New Orleans Pelicans, a Brooklyn Dodgers farm team at the time, and made his professional debut on September 5, 1943. He appeared in only three games that season, all as a third baseman, and collected two singles in eight at bats.

Strickland's baseball career was interrupted when he was drafted into the United States Navy in March 1944. He was stationed as a Specialist Mailman for 16 months in Saipan after American forces had captured the island from the Imperial Japanese Army in July of the same year. He was given his honorable discharge in May 1946.

He returned to the Pelicans, which had become a Boston Red Sox affiliate prior to the 1946 campaign, and played the latter half of the schedule at third base. After spending a little more than a season with the Scranton Red Sox, he was assigned to the Louisville Colonels in 1948, becoming a full-time shortstop. His best year in the minors was in 1949 when he batted .261 in 128 games with the Birmingham Barons.

=== Pittsburgh Pirates ===
Strickland was selected by Pittsburgh in the Rule 5 draft on November 17, 1949. He made his Major League debut on May 7, 1950, in a 3–2 loss to the Dodgers at Forbes Field. During his three years with the team, the Pirates were relegated to the bottom two positions in the National League standings. His only season as its starting shortstop was 1951 when he batted .216 in 138 contests and committed a major-league-high 37 errors. He was traded with Ted Wilks to the Indians for John Beradino, Charlie Ripple and $50,000 on August 18, 1952.

=== Cleveland Indians ===
Upon his arrival in Cleveland, Strickland supplanted Ray Boone to become the starting shortstop through 1955. Strickland's first full season with the team in 1953 was also his best at the plate as he hit .284 in 123 matches. His .976 fielding percentage in 1955 led all regular shortstops in the majors during that campaign. In his eight years with the ballclub, the Indians finished no lower than second place in the American League (AL) five times.

He was a key member of the 1954 AL Champions who ended the New York Yankees' run of five straight pennants and whose 111 regular-season victories established a junior circuit record that lasted until the Yankees won 114 games in 1998, a mark surpassed when the Seattle Mariners won 116 in 2001. The World Series that year, in which the Indians were swept in four games by the New York Giants, was Strickland's only postseason experience. He went hitless in nine at-bats in the first three contests. In the top half of the opening inning of the 6–2 defeat in Game 3 at Cleveland Stadium, he committed a throwing error attempting to complete a double play, leading to the Giants' first run of the match. He was replaced by Sam Dente in the series-ending 7–4 loss in Game 4.

Cleveland's acquisition of Chico Carrasquel after the 1955 season reduced Strickland's role to utility infielder. After stepping away from the sport for a year, he returned to the Indians in 1959 and made 122 starts, 72 at third base. His final game as a player was the Indians' 4–2 triumph over the Red Sox at Fenway Park on July 23, 1960. He entered the contest with one out in the Boston eighth as a substitute at third base for Bubba Phillips, who was sent to left field to replace Jimmy Piersall, who had been ejected for arguing with home plate umpire Ed Hurley over his distraction of batter Ted Williams. Strickland's playing career ended when he was released on August 3.

== Managerial/coaching career ==
Strickland worked as a scout for the Indians in 1961. He spent the following year on Sam Mele's coaching staff with a Minnesota Twins team that finished in second place, five games behind the eventual World Series Champion Yankees. He returned to Cleveland to serve as third-base coach under three managers (Birdie Tebbetts, Joe Adcock and Alvin Dark) from 1963 to 1969.

He became the Indians' interim manager at the beginning of the 1964 campaign when Tebbetts suffered a heart attack near the end of spring training on April 1. Strickland's managerial debut was a 7–6 loss at home to the Twins in the season opener on April 14. The ballclub made it to the top of the AL standings by the end of the month and would spend thirteen days in that position, the latest being on May 16. His stint ended with the team on a six-game losing streak, culminating in a 9–1 defeat on the road to the Detroit Tigers on July 2. The Indians were in eighth place with a 33–39 record and thirteen games behind the league-leading Baltimore Orioles by the time Tebbetts returned to the club the next day.

Strickland was called upon to lead the ballclub on an interim basis again after Tebbetts was dismissed on August 19, 1966, with the 66–57 team in third place and trailing the eventual World Series Champion Orioles by fourteen games. Going 15–24 under Strickland, the Indians ended the campaign in fifth place at 81–81, seventeen games off the pace. The final contest he managed was a 2–0 loss to the California Angels in the season finale at Anaheim Stadium on October 2. His career record as a Major League manager was 48–63 (.432). Tommy John recalled that people thought Strickland would make a good manager. "But the thing was, when he talked, you couldn't understand what he was saying. He'd get very deep, and you'd lose his point."

When Strickland joined the Kansas City Royals coaching staff in 1970, he was reunited with former Indians teammate Bob Lemon, who would be promoted to manager in early June. The most successful of the three years he spent in Kansas City was 1971 when the Royals vaulted into second place in the AL Western Division with an 85–76 record in only the franchise's third season of existence. Strickland retired from baseball in 1972 after a fourth-place finish with a 76–78 mark cost Lemon his job.

=== Managerial Record ===
| Team | Year | Regular season | | | | | Postseason | | | |
| Team | Year | Games | Won | Lost | Win % | Finish | Won | Lost | Win % | Result |
|---|---|---|---|---|---|---|---|---|---|---|
| CLE | 1964 | 72 | 33 | 39 | .458 | Interim | – | – | – | |
| CLE | 1966 | 39 | 15 | 24 | .385 | Interim | – | – | – | |
| Total | | 111 | 48 | 63 | .432 | | 0 | 0 | – | |

== Life after baseball ==
Strickland was once the parimutuels manager at Fair Grounds Race Course. He was interested in psychology and philosophy; John recalled him reading books by Thomas Aquinas, Friedrich Nietzsche, and Jean-Paul Sartre. He was inducted into the Greater New Orleans Sports Hall of Fame in 1981 and the Louisiana Sports Hall of Fame in 2006. He died at age 84 in New Orleans on February 21, 2010.
