= Jim Hicks =

American baseball player (1940–2020)

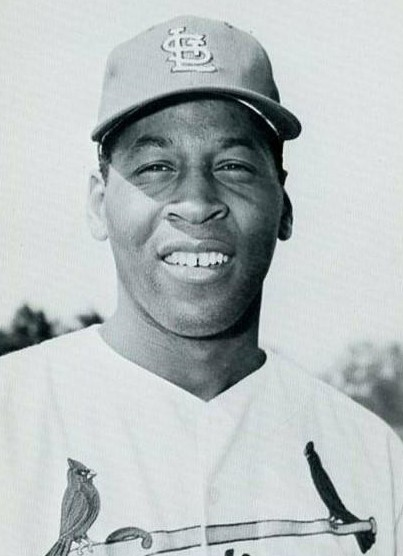
- Outfielder
- Born: May 18, 1940; Claiborne County, Mississippi, U.S.
- Died: October 29, 2020 (aged 80); Missouri City, Texas, U.S.
- Batted: Right Threw: Right

MLB debut
- September 19, 1964, for the Chicago White Sox

Last MLB appearance
- April 20, 1970, for the California Angels

MLB statistics
- Batting average: .163
- Home runs: 5
- Runs batted in: 14
- Stats at Baseball Reference

Teams
- Chicago White Sox (1964–1966); St. Louis Cardinals (1969); California Angels (1969–1970); Hiroshima Toyo Carp (1973–1974)

Career highlights and awards
- Pacific Coast League MVP (1968)

James Edward Hicks (May 18, 1940 – October 29, 2020) was an American professional baseball player. He played in Major League Baseball as an outfielder and first baseman from 1964 to 1970 and in the Nippon Professional Baseball league from 1973 to 1974. He played in 93 games over all or parts of five seasons in Major League Baseball for the Chicago White Sox, St. Louis Cardinals and the California Angels. He threw and batted right-handed, stood 6 feet 3 inches (1.91 m) tall and weighed 205 pounds (93 kg).

== Early life and education ==
Born in East Chicago, Indiana, Hicks attended the University of Illinois at Urbana–Champaign.

== Career ==
=== White Sox farm system and Chisox ===
After signing with the White Sox in 1959, Hicks played six seasons in their farm system before breaking the ice with two MLB appearances as a pinch runner in the waning days of 1964. He spent portions of 1965 and 1966 with the ChiSox, but got into only 31 games with 47 plate appearances.

=== MVP in Pacific Coast League ===
His contract was finally sold to the Cardinals' organization after the 1967 minor league season. In 1968, Hicks was named Most Valuable Player of the Triple-A Pacific Coast League when he batted .366 with 149 hits — including 32 doubles, 23 home runs and 85 runs batted in for the Redbirds' Tulsa Oilers affiliate.

=== Single full MLB season ===
The banner year set up Hicks' lone full season in the majors, 1969, which he split between the Cardinals and the California Angels. He started an MLB-career-high 11 games as the Cardinals' right fielder during May, but was hitting only .182 with one home run when he was traded to the Angels May 30 for another outfielder, Vic Davalillo. The Angels used Hicks in 37 games as an outfielder, first baseman and pinch hitter, but he collected only four hits in 48 at bats (.083), although three of those hits were home runs.

=== Hawaii and Japan ===
A brief stay on the Angels' 1970 opening-season roster produced one single in four pinch-hitting appearances before he was sent to the Angels' Triple-A affiliate, the Hawaii Islanders of the Pacific Coast League. Now a 30-year-old veteran, Hicks put up three strong seasons for the Islanders, hitting over .300 with power each year. As a result, he was acquired by Hiroshima and played two years in NPB, appearing in 183 total games and hitting .247 with 33 home runs.

== Playing style and statistics ==
Hicks played a total of 93 MLB games as an outfielder and first baseman. Hicks' professional career in North America and Japan lasted for 16 seasons, and saw him hit more than 245 home runs. Jim Hicks batted .163 lifetime in the major leagues, with 23 hits – one double, three triples, five home runs and 14 runs batted in — in 141 at bats. Hicks threw and batted right-handed, stood 6 feet 3 inches (1.91 m) tall and weighed 205 pounds (93 kg).

== Death ==
Hicks died on October 29, 2020.
