= 1964 Baltimore Orioles season =

Major League Baseball season

1964 Baltimore Orioles
- League: American League
- Ballpark: Memorial Stadium
- City: Baltimore, Maryland
- Record: 97–65 (.599)
- League place: 3rd
- Owners: Jerold Hoffberger, Joseph Iglehart
- General managers: Lee MacPhail
- Managers: Hank Bauer
- Television: WJZ-TV
- Radio: WBAL (AM) (Chuck Thompson, Frank Messer)

The 1964 Baltimore Orioles season involved the Orioles finishing third in the American League with a record of 97 wins, 65 losses and one tie, two games behind the AL champion New York Yankees. Baltimore spent 92 days in first place during the season before relinquishing that position on September 18.

== Offseason ==
- November 27, 1963: Jim Gentile and $25,000 were traded by the Orioles to the Kansas City Athletics for Norm Siebern.
- December 2, 1963: Lou Jackson was drafted by the Orioles from the Milwaukee Braves in the 1963 rule 5 draft.
- March 31, 1964: Buster Narum was traded by the Orioles to the Washington Senators for a player to be named later. The Senators completed the deal by sending Lou Piniella to the Orioles on August 4.

== Regular season ==
=== Season standings ===
American League
Team	W	L	Pct.	GB	Home	Road
New York Yankees	99	63	.611	—	50‍–‍31	49‍–‍32
Chicago White Sox	98	64	.605	1	52‍–‍29	46‍–‍35
Baltimore Orioles	97	65	.599	2	49‍–‍32	48‍–‍33
Detroit Tigers	85	77	.525	14	46‍–‍35	39‍–‍42
Los Angeles Angels	82	80	.506	17	45‍–‍36	37‍–‍44
Cleveland Indians	79	83	.488	20	41‍–‍40	38‍–‍43
Minnesota Twins	79	83	.488	20	40‍–‍41	39‍–‍42
Boston Red Sox	72	90	.444	27	45‍–‍36	27‍–‍54
Washington Senators	62	100	.383	37	31‍–‍50	31‍–‍50
Kansas City Athletics	57	105	.352	42	26‍–‍55	31‍–‍50

=== Record vs. opponents ===
1964 American League record Sources:
Team	BAL	BOS	CWS	CLE	DET	KCA	LAA	MIN	NYY	WAS
Baltimore	—	11–7	10–8	8–10	11–7	13–5–1	11–7	10–8	10–8	13–5
Boston	7–11	—	4–14	9–9	5–13	12–6	9–9	5–13	9–9	12–6
Chicago	8–10	14–4	—	12–6	11–7	16–2	10–8	9–9	6–12	12–6
Cleveland	10–8	9–9	6–12	—	11–7	10–8	9–9	10–8–1	3–15–1	11–7
Detroit	7–11	13–5	7–11	7–11	—	11–7	10–8	11–7	8–10–1	11–7
Kansas City	5–13–1	6–12	2–16	8–10	7–11	—	6–12	9–9	6–12	8–10
Los Angeles	7–11	9–9	8–10	9–9	8–10	12–6	—	12–6	7–11	10–8
Minnesota	8–10	13–5	9–9	8–10–1	7–11	9–9	6–12	—	8–10	11–7
New York	8–10	9–9	12–6	15–3–1	10–8–1	12–6	11–7	10–8	—	12–6
Washington	5–13	6–12	6–12	7–11	7–11	10–8	8–10	7–11	6–12	—

=== Roster ===
1964 Baltimore Orioles
Roster
Pitchers: 13 Steve Barber; 18 Frank Bertaina; 27 Wally Bunker; 23 Chuck Estrada; 30 Harvey Haddix; 29 Dick Hall; 35 Sam Jones; 40 Mike McCormick; 19 Dave McNally; 37 Stu Miller; 32 Milt Pappas; 38 Robin Roberts; 17 Ken Rowe; 24 Herm Starrette; 18 Wes Stock; 20 Dave Vineyard	Catchers: 10 Dick Brown; 44 Charley Lau; 12 John Orsino; Infielders: 7 Jerry Adair; 11 Luis Aparicio; 2 Bob Johnson; 5 Brooks Robinson; 1 Bob Saverine; 4 Norm Siebern	Outfielders: 33 Paul Blair; 16 Sam Bowens; 25 Jackie Brandt; 20 Gino Cimoli; 6 Joe Gaines; 6 Lenny Green; 44 Lou Jackson; 3 Willie Kirkland; 8,26 Boog Powell; 34 Earl Robinson; 9 Russ Snyder; Other batters: 24 Lou Piniella	Manager: 42 Hank Bauer; Coaches: 31 Harry Brecheen; 55 Billy Hunter; 41 Sherm Lollar; 14 Gene Woodling

== Player stats ==
=== Batting ===
==== Starters by position ====
Note: Pos = Position; G = Games played; AB = At bats; H = Hits; Avg. = Batting average; HR = Home runs; RBI = Runs batted in

Pos	Player	G	AB	H	Avg.	HR	RBI
C	Dick Brown	88	230	59	.257	8	32
1B	Norm Siebern	150	478	117	.245	12	56
2B	Jerry Adair	155	569	141	.248	9	47
3B	Brooks Robinson	163	612	194	.317	28	118
SS	Luis Aparicio	146	578	154	.266	10	37
LF	Boog Powell	134	424	123	.290	39	99
CF	Jackie Brandt	137	523	127	.243	13	47
RF	Sam Bowens	139	501	132	.263	22	71

==== Other batters ====
Note: G = Games played; AB = At bats; H = Hits; Avg. = Batting average; HR = Home runs; RBI = Runs batted in

Player	G	AB	H	Avg.	HR	RBI
John Orsino	81	248	55	.222	8	23
Bob Johnson	93	210	52	.248	3	29
Charley Lau	62	158	41	.259	1	14
Willie Kirkland	66	150	30	.200	3	22
Earl Robinson	37	121	33	.273	3	10
Russ Snyder	56	93	27	.290	1	7
Gino Cimoli	38	58	8	.138	0	3
Bob Saverine	46	34	5	.147	0	0
Joe Gaines	16	26	4	.154	1	2
Lenny Green	14	21	4	.190	0	1
Lou Jackson	4	8	3	.375	0	0
Paul Blair	8	1	0	.000	0	0
Lou Piniella	4	1	0	.000	0	0

=== Pitching ===
==== Starting pitchers ====
Note: G = Games pitched; IP = Innings pitched; W = Wins; L = Losses; ERA = Earned run average; SO = Strikeouts

Player	G	IP	W	L	ERA	SO
Milt Pappas	37	251.2	16	7	2.97	157
Wally Bunker	29	214.0	19	5	2.69	96
Robin Roberts	31	204.0	13	7	2.91	109
Dave McNally	30	159.1	9	11	3.67	88
Steve Barber	36	157.0	9	13	3.84	118

==== Other pitchers ====
Note: G = Games pitched; IP = Innings pitched; W = Wins; L = Losses; ERA = Earned run average; SO = Strikeouts

Player	G	IP	W	L	ERA	SO
Stu Miller	66	97.0	7	7	3.06	87
Harvey Haddix	49	89.2	5	5	2.31	90
Dick Hall	45	87.2	9	1	1.85	52
Chuck Estrada	17	54.2	3	2	5.27	32
Dave Vineyard	19	54.0	2	5	4.17	50
Frank Bertaina	6	26.0	1	0	2.77	18
Mike McCormick	4	17.1	0	2	5.19	13

==== Relief pitchers ====
Note: G = Games pitched; W = Wins; L = Losses; SV = Saves; ERA = Earned run average; SO = Strikeouts

Player	G	W	L	SV	ERA	SO
Wes Stock	14	2	0	0	3.92	14
Sam Jones	7	0	0	0	2.61	6
Ken Rowe	6	1	0	0	8.31	4
Herm Starrette	5	1	0	1	1.64	5

== Awards and honors ==
- Hank Bauer, Associated Press AL Manager of the Year

== Farm system ==
Level	Team	League	Manager
AAA	Rochester Red Wings	International League	Darrell Johnson
AA	Elmira Pioneers	Eastern League	Earl Weaver
A	Stockton Ports	California League	Harry Dunlop
A	Fox Cities Foxes	Midwest League	Billy DeMars
A	Aberdeen Pheasants	Northern League	Cal Ripken Sr.
Rookie	Bluefield Orioles	Appalachian League	Jim Frey

LEAGUE CHAMPIONS: Rochester, Elmira, Fox Cities, Aberdeen
