= 1964 Los Angeles Angels season =

Major League Baseball season

1964 Los Angeles Angels
- League: American League
- Ballpark: Chávez Ravine Stadium
- City: Los Angeles, California
- Record: 82–80 (.506)
- League place: 5th
- Owner: Gene Autry
- General manager: Fred Haney
- Manager: Bill Rigney
- Television: KTLA
- Radio: KMPC (Buddy Blattner, Don Wells, Steve Bailey)
- Stats: ESPN.com; Baseball Reference

The 1964 Los Angeles Angels season was the 4th season of the Angels franchise in the American League, the 4th in Los Angeles, and their 3rd season playing their home games at Chávez Ravine Stadium. The Angels finished the season fifth in the American League with a record of 82 wins and 80 losses, 17 games behind the AL Champion New York Yankees.

== Offseason ==
- December 2, 1963: Bill Kelso was drafted by the Angels from the Los Angeles Dodgers in the 1963 rule 5 draft.

== Regular season ==
=== Season standings ===
American League
Team	W	L	Pct.	GB	Home	Road
New York Yankees	99	63	.611	—	50‍–‍31	49‍–‍32
Chicago White Sox	98	64	.605	1	52‍–‍29	46‍–‍35
Baltimore Orioles	97	65	.599	2	49‍–‍32	48‍–‍33
Detroit Tigers	85	77	.525	14	46‍–‍35	39‍–‍42
Los Angeles Angels	82	80	.506	17	45‍–‍36	37‍–‍44
Cleveland Indians	79	83	.488	20	41‍–‍40	38‍–‍43
Minnesota Twins	79	83	.488	20	40‍–‍41	39‍–‍42
Boston Red Sox	72	90	.444	27	45‍–‍36	27‍–‍54
Washington Senators	62	100	.383	37	31‍–‍50	31‍–‍50
Kansas City Athletics	57	105	.352	42	26‍–‍55	31‍–‍50

=== Record vs. opponents ===
1964 American League record Sources:
Team	BAL	BOS	CWS	CLE	DET	KCA	LAA	MIN	NYY	WAS
Baltimore	—	11–7	10–8	8–10	11–7	13–5–1	11–7	10–8	10–8	13–5
Boston	7–11	—	4–14	9–9	5–13	12–6	9–9	5–13	9–9	12–6
Chicago	8–10	14–4	—	12–6	11–7	16–2	10–8	9–9	6–12	12–6
Cleveland	10–8	9–9	6–12	—	11–7	10–8	9–9	10–8–1	3–15–1	11–7
Detroit	7–11	13–5	7–11	7–11	—	11–7	10–8	11–7	8–10–1	11–7
Kansas City	5–13–1	6–12	2–16	8–10	7–11	—	6–12	9–9	6–12	8–10
Los Angeles	7–11	9–9	8–10	9–9	8–10	12–6	—	12–6	7–11	10–8
Minnesota	8–10	13–5	9–9	8–10–1	7–11	9–9	6–12	—	8–10	11–7
New York	8–10	9–9	12–6	15–3–1	10–8–1	12–6	11–7	10–8	—	12–6
Washington	5–13	6–12	6–12	7–11	7–11	10–8	8–10	7–11	6–12	—

=== Notable transactions ===
- April 10, 1964: Jimmy Piersall was signed as a free agent by the Angels.
- May 15, 1964: Art Fowler was released by the Los Angeles Angels.

=== Roster ===
1964 Los Angeles Angels
Roster
Pitchers: 36 Bo Belinsky; 43 George Brunet; 31 Dean Chance; 45 Bob Duliba; 24 Art Fowler; 20 Paul Foytack; 38 Aubrey Gatewood; 22 Bill Kelso; 34 Barry Latman; 39 Bob Lee; 48 Don Lee; 37 Ken McBride; 41 Bob Meyer; 35 Julio Navarro; 17 Fred Newman; 40 Dan Osinski; 41 Jack Spring; 33 Ed Sukla	Catchers: 16 Jack Hiatt; 7 Buck Rodgers; Infielders: 6 Joe Adcock; 23 Charlie Dees; 11 Jim Fregosi; 29 Bobby Knoop; 1 Joe Koppe; 12 Billy Moran; 14 Vic Power; 2 Tom Satriano; 42 Paul Schaal; 19 Félix Torres	Outfielders: 15 Lou Clinton; 26 Lenny Green; 8 Ed Kirkpatrick; 28 Albie Pearson; 25 Bob Perry; 4 Jimmy Piersall; 20 Rick Reichardt; 10 Dick Simpson; 35 Willie Smith; 32 Lee Thomas; Other batters: 16 Hank Foiles	Manager: 18 Bill Rigney; Coaches: 5 Marv Grissom; 3 Jack Paepke; 21 Salty Parker; 9 Del Rice

== Player stats ==
= Indicates team leader

=== Batting ===
==== Starters by position ====
Note: Pos = Position; G = Games played; AB = At bats; H = Hits; Avg. = Batting average; HR = Home runs; RBI = Runs batted in

Pos	Player	G	AB	H	Avg.	HR	RBI
C	Buck Rodgers	148	514	125	.243	4	54
1B	Joe Adcock	118	366	98	.268	21	64
2B	Bobby Knoop	162	486	105	.216	7	38
3B	Félix Torres	100	277	64	.231	12	28
SS	Jim Fregosi	147	505	140	.277	18	72
LF	Ed Kirkpatrick	75	219	53	.242	2	22
CF	Bob Perry	70	221	61	.276	3	16
RF	Lou Clinton	91	306	76	.248	9	38

==== Other batters ====
Note: G = Games played; AB = At bats; H = Hits; Avg. = Batting average; HR = Home runs; RBI = Runs batted in

Player	G	AB	H	Avg.	HR	RBI
Willie Smith	118	359	108	.301	11	51
Albie Pearson	107	265	59	.223	2	16
Tom Satriano	108	255	51	.200	1	17
Jimmy Piersall	87	255	80	.314	2	13
Vic Power	68	221	55	.249	3	13
Billy Moran	50	198	53	.268	0	11
Lee Thomas	47	172	47	.273	2	24
Joe Koppe	54	113	29	.257	0	6
Lenny Green	39	92	23	.250	2	4
Dick Simpson	21	50	7	.140	2	4
Rick Reichardt	11	37	6	.162	0	0
Paul Schaal	17	32	4	.125	0	0
Charlie Dees	26	26	2	.077	0	1
Jack Hiatt	9	16	6	.375	0	2
Hank Foiles	4	4	1	.250	0	0

=== Pitching ===
= Indicates league leader

==== Starting pitchers ====
Note: G = Games pitched; IP = Innings pitched; W = Wins; L = Losses; ERA = Earned run average; SO = Strikeouts

Player	G	IP	W	L	ERA	SO
Dean Chance	46	278.1	20*	9	1.65	207
Fred Newman	32	190.0	13	10	2.75	83
Bo Belinsky	23	135.1	9	8	2.86	91
Bob Meyer	6	18.0	1	1	5.00	13

- Tied with Gary Peters (CWS) for League lead

==== Other pitchers ====
Note: G = Games pitched; IP = Innings pitched; W = Wins; L = Losses; ERA = Earned run average; SO = Strikeouts

Player	G	IP	W	L	ERA	SO
Barry Latman	40	138.0	6	10	3.85	81
Ken McBride	29	116.1	4	13	5.26	66
Don Lee	33	89.1	5	4	2.72	73
Aubrey Gatewood	15	60.1	3	3	2.24	25
George Brunet	10	42.1	2	2	3.61	36

==== Relief pitchers ====
Note: G = Games pitched; W = Wins; L = Losses; SV = Saves; ERA = Earned run average; SO = Strikeouts

Player	G	W	L	SV	ERA	SO
Bob Lee	64	6	5	19	1.51	111
Bob Duliba	58	6	4	9	3.59	33
Dan Osinski	47	3	3	2	3.48	88
Willie Smith	15	1	4	0	2.84	20
Bill Kelso	10	2	0	0	2.28	21
Jack Spring	6	1	0	0	2.70	0
Julio Navarro	5	0	0	1	1.93	8
Art Fowler	4	0	2	1	10.29	5
Ed Sukla	2	0	1	0	6.75	3
Paul Foytack	2	0	1	0	15.43	1

== Awards and honors ==
- Dean Chance, Cy Young Award

All-Star Game

- Dean Chance, Pitcher, Starter
- Jim Fregosi, Shortstop, Starter

== Farm system ==
Level	Team	League	Manager
AAA	Hawaii Islanders	Pacific Coast League	Bob Lemon
A	San Jose Bees	California League	Rocky Bridges
A	Quad Cities Angels	Midwest League	Chuck Tanner
A	Tri-City Angels	Northwest League	Tommy Heath
Rookie	Idaho Falls Angels	Pioneer League	John Fitzpatrick

Records
Preceded by 1963	Los Angeles Angels seasons 1964	Succeeded by 1965
