= 1964 Kansas City Athletics season =

1964 Kansas City Athletics
- League: American League
- Ballpark: Municipal Stadium
- City: Kansas City, Missouri
- Record: 57–105 (.352)
- League place: 10th
- Owners: Charles O. Finley
- General managers: Pat Friday
- Managers: Ed Lopat, Mel McGaha
- Television: KCMO
- Radio: KCMO (AM) (Monte Moore, George Bryson, Betty Caywood)

The 1964 Kansas City Athletics season was the tenth for the franchise in Kansas City and the 64th overall. It involved the A's finishing tenth in the American League with a record of 57 wins, 105 losses and one tie, 42 games behind the American League Champion New York Yankees.

== Offseason ==
- In January 1964, owner Charles O. Finley signed an agreement to move the A's to Louisville, promising to change the team's name to the "Kentucky Athletics". (Other names suggested for the team were the "Kentucky Colonels" and the "Louisville Sluggers.") By another 9–1 vote by the league owners, his request was denied. Six weeks later, by the same 9–1 margin, the A.L. owners denied Finley's request to move the team to Oakland, where the team would eventually move after the 1967 season.
- On February 28, Finley signed a four-year lease to remain in Kansas City. The club would pay no rent at Municipal Stadium but the city would get 5% on admission and 7.5% on concessions. The clause was that if the club could not reach a paid attendance of 575,000 fans, then the club owed nothing.
- In early April, Finley tried to shorten the rather distant fences at the stadium by creating a 296-foot (90 m) Pennant Porch in right field, fronting a tiny bleacher section, to mock the famed short fence in right field at Yankee Stadium, home of the powerful Yankees. The move was quickly vetoed by the league, so Finley rebuilt the fence to the bare legal minimum of 325 feet (99 m), and repainted the fence to say "One-Half Pennant Porch". Later he tried the ruse of putting a canopy over the little bleacher, which just happened to have an extension that reached out 29 feet (9 m) over the field. The league, not amused by Finley's sense of humor, again ordered him to cease and desist.

=== Notable transactions ===
- October 7, 1963: Sammy Esposito was released by the Athletics.
- November 27, 1963: Norm Siebern was traded to the Baltimore Orioles for Jim Gentile and $25,000.
- December 2, 1963: John Donaldson was selected by the Athletics from the Minnesota Twins in the rule 5 draft.

== Regular season ==
- The club set a franchise record by hitting 107 home runs during home games, while the A's pitching staff gave up 132 home runs during home games. At the time, it was a major league record.
- Eighteen-year-old free agent Catfish Hunter was not able to pitch in 1964. He was sent to the Mayo Clinic, as surgeons worked on his right foot, which had been injured in a hunting accident the previous autumn. Hunter recovered at Finley's farm in La Porte, Indiana.
- Shortstop Bert Campaneris made his major league debut on July 23 at Minnesota, and hit two home runs off Jim Kaat in the first (first pitch) and seventh innings; joining the team earlier that day, he also singled, walked, and stole a base.
- On September 5, 19-year-old Blue Moon Odom made his major league debut against the visiting New York Yankees. Odom started but lasted just two innings, giving up six earned runs on six hits with two walks and one strikeout. The A's tied the game in the third inning, so he did not get the loss.
- On September 17, the A's were away on an eastern road trip and The Beatles played Municipal Stadium as part of their first U.S. tour. The date was originally supposed to be an off-day for the band between concerts in New Orleans and Dallas, but they agreed to perform when Finley offered their manager Brian Epstein a then-record sum of $150,000 (equivalent to $1.14 million in 2014). The group opened the half-hour Thursday night concert by saluting the host town with their medley of "Kansas City" and "Hey, Hey, Hey, Hey"; a month later, they would record the medley for their fourth studio album, Beatles for Sale.

=== Season standings ===
American League
Team	W	L	Pct.	GB	Home	Road
New York Yankees	99	63	.611	—	50‍–‍31	49‍–‍32
Chicago White Sox	98	64	.605	1	52‍–‍29	46‍–‍35
Baltimore Orioles	97	65	.599	2	49‍–‍32	48‍–‍33
Detroit Tigers	85	77	.525	14	46‍–‍35	39‍–‍42
Los Angeles Angels	82	80	.506	17	45‍–‍36	37‍–‍44
Cleveland Indians	79	83	.488	20	41‍–‍40	38‍–‍43
Minnesota Twins	79	83	.488	20	40‍–‍41	39‍–‍42
Boston Red Sox	72	90	.444	27	45‍–‍36	27‍–‍54
Washington Senators	62	100	.383	37	31‍–‍50	31‍–‍50
Kansas City Athletics	57	105	.352	42	26‍–‍55	31‍–‍50

=== Record vs. opponents ===
1964 American League record Sources:
Team	BAL	BOS	CWS	CLE	DET	KCA	LAA	MIN	NYY	WAS
Baltimore	—	11–7	10–8	8–10	11–7	13–5–1	11–7	10–8	10–8	13–5
Boston	7–11	—	4–14	9–9	5–13	12–6	9–9	5–13	9–9	12–6
Chicago	8–10	14–4	—	12–6	11–7	16–2	10–8	9–9	6–12	12–6
Cleveland	10–8	9–9	6–12	—	11–7	10–8	9–9	10–8–1	3–15–1	11–7
Detroit	7–11	13–5	7–11	7–11	—	11–7	10–8	11–7	8–10–1	11–7
Kansas City	5–13–1	6–12	2–16	8–10	7–11	—	6–12	9–9	6–12	8–10
Los Angeles	7–11	9–9	8–10	9–9	8–10	12–6	—	12–6	7–11	10–8
Minnesota	8–10	13–5	9–9	8–10–1	7–11	9–9	6–12	—	8–10	11–7
New York	8–10	9–9	12–6	15–3–1	10–8–1	12–6	11–7	10–8	—	12–6
Washington	5–13	6–12	6–12	7–11	7–11	10–8	8–10	7–11	6–12	—

=== Notable transactions ===
- June 8, 1964: Catfish Hunter was signed as an amateur free agent by the Athletics.
- June 13, 1964: Joe Rudi was signed as an amateur free agent by the Athletics.

=== Roster ===
1964 Kansas City Athletics
Roster
Pitchers: 21 Jack Aker; 43 Ted Bowsfield; 25 Moe Drabowsky; 36 Joe Grzenda; 19 Vern Handrahan; 21,31 Lew Krausse Jr.; 30 Bob Meyer; 31 Aurelio Monteagudo; 26 John O'Donoghue; 13 Blue Moon Odom; 22,24 Orlando Peña; 27 Dan Pfister; 27 Ken Sanders; 21 José Santiago; 17 Diego Seguí; 18 Wes Stock; 18 Tom Sturdivant; 33 John Wyatt	Catchers: 9 Billy Bryan; 11 Dave Duncan; 10 Doc Edwards; 14 Charley Lau; Infielders: 19 Bert Campaneris; 2 Wayne Causey; 16 Ed Charles; 6 Jim Gentile; 1 Dick Green; 20 Rick Joseph; 14 Charlie Shoemaker; 8 George Williams	Outfielders: 3 George Alusik; 4 Gino Cimoli; 7 Rocky Colavito; 4 Ken Harrelson; 12,20 Manny Jiménez; 5 Nelson Mathews; 35 Tommie Reynolds; 14 Larry Stahl; 15 José Tartabull; 4 John Wojcik	Manager: 30 Eddie Lopat; 41 Mel McGaha; Coaches: 44 Luke Appling; 48 Babe Dahlgren; 40 Jimmy Dykes; 49 Tom Ferrick; 41 Mel McGaha; 42 Gus Niarhos

== Player stats ==
= Indicates team leader

=== Batting ===
==== Starters by position ====
Note: Pos = Position; G = Games played; AB = At bats; H = Hits; Avg. = Batting average; HR = Home runs; RBI = Runs batted in

Pos	Player	G	AB	H	Avg.	HR	RBI
C	Doc Edwards	97	294	66	.224	5	28
1B	Jim Gentile	136	439	110	.251	28	71
2B	Dick Green	130	435	115	.264	11	37
3B	Ed Charles	150	557	134	.241	16	63
SS	Wayne Causey	157	604	170	.281	8	49
LF	Manny Jiménez	95	204	46	.225	12	38
CF	Nelson Mathews	157	573	137	.239	14	60
RF	Rocky Colavito	160	588	161	.274	34	102

==== Other batters ====
Note: G = Games played; AB = At bats; H = Hits; Avg. = Batting average; HR = Home runs; RBI = Runs batted in

Player	G	AB	H	Avg.	HR	RBI
Bert Campaneris	67	269	69	.257	4	22
Billy Bryan	93	220	53	.241	13	36
George Alusik	102	204	49	.240	3	19
Ken Harrelson	49	139	27	.194	7	12
Charley Lau	43	118	32	.271	2	9
José Tartabull	104	100	20	.200	0	3
Tommie Reynolds	31	94	19	.202	2	9
George Williams	37	91	19	.209	0	2
Rick Joseph	17	54	12	.222	0	1
Dave Duncan	25	53	9	.170	1	5
Charlie Shoemaker	16	52	11	.212	0	3
Larry Stahl	15	46	12	.261	3	6
John Wojcik	6	22	3	.136	0	0
Gino Cimoli	4	9	0	.000	0	0

=== Pitching ===
==== Starting pitchers ====
Note: G = Games pitched; IP = Innings pitched; W = Wins; L = Losses; ERA = Earned run average; SO = Strikeouts

Player	G	IP	W	L	ERA	SO
Orlando Peña	40	219.1	12	14	4.43	184
Diego Seguí	40	217.0	8	17	4.56	155
John O'Donohue	39	173.2	10	14	4.92	79
Bob Meyer	9	42.0	1	4	3.86	30
Blue Moon Odom	5	17.0	1	2	10.06	10
Lew Krausse Jr.	5	14.2	0	2	7.36	9

==== Other pitchers ====
Note: G = Games pitched; IP = Innings pitched; W = Wins; L = Losses; ERA = Earned run average; SO = Strikeouts

Player	G	IP	W	L	ERA	SO
Moe Drabowski	53	168.1	5	13	5.29	119
Ted Bowsfield	50	118.2	4	7	4.10	45
José Santiago	34	83.2	0	6	4.73	64
Aurelio Monteagudo	11	31.1	0	4	8.90	14

==== Relief pitchers ====
Note: G = Games pitched; W = Wins; L = Losses; SV = Saves; ERA = Earned run average; SO = Strikeouts

Player	G	W	L	SV	ERA	SO
John Wyatt	81	9	8	20	3.59	74
Wes Stock	50	6	3	5	1.94	101
Ken Sanders	21	0	2	1	3.67	18
Joe Grzenda	20	0	2	0	5.40	17
Dan Pfister	19	1	5	0	6.53	21
Vern Handrahan	18	0	1	0	6.06	18
Jack Aker	9	0	1	0	8.82	7
Tom Sturdivant	3	0	0	0	9.82	1

== Farm system ==
- The A's scouts had signed 80 prospects for $650,000, at the time, the most money spent on prospects in one year.

Level	Team	League	Manager
AAA	Dallas Rangers	Pacific Coast League	John McNamara
AA	Birmingham Barons	Southern League	Haywood Sullivan
A	Daytona Beach Islanders	Florida State League	Grady Wilson, Bill Posedel and Lew Krausse, Sr.
A	Burlington Bees	Midwest League	Bill Robertson
A	Lewiston Broncos	Northwest League	Bobby Hofman
Rookie	Wytheville A's	Appalachian League	Gus Niarhos
