= Bill Spanswick =

American baseball player (1938–2020)

- Pitcher
- Born: July 8, 1938; Springfield, Massachusetts, U.S.
- Died: December 2, 2020 (aged 82); Naples, Florida, U.S.
- Batted: Left Threw: Left

MLB debut
- April 18, 1964, for the Boston Red Sox

Last MLB appearance
- September 20, 1964, for the Boston Red Sox

MLB statistics
- Win–loss record: 2–3
- Earned run average: 6.89
- Strikeouts: 55
- Stats at Baseball Reference

Teams
- Boston Red Sox (1964)

William Henry Spanswick (July 8, 1938 – December 2, 2020) was an American professional baseball player. A left-handed pitcher, Spanswick appeared in 29 games, seven as a starter, in the Major Leagues for the 1964 Boston Red Sox.

Spanswick was born in Springfield, Massachusetts. Listed at 6 feet 3 inches (1.91 m) tall and 195 pounds (88 kg), he graduated from high school in Enfield, Connecticut, and attended The College of the Holy Cross. He signed with the Red Sox in 1958 and spent six years working his way through the Boston farm system when he made the 1964 club out of spring training. He stayed on the Red Sox roster for the entire campaign. His two MLB victories came May 8 as a starter against the Washington Senators and June 28 in relief against the Cleveland Indians, with bullpen ace Dick Radatz getting saves in each game.

Spanswick pitched exclusively in relief after June 19, 1964. In 65 1/3 innings pitched, he allowed 75 hits and 44 bases on balls, with 55 strikeouts. The 1964 Red Sox finished eighth in the ten-team American League, with a 72–90 (.444) record.

He returned to the minor leagues in 1965 and retired after the 1968 season.

Spanswick was elected as a member of the inaugural class of the Enfield Athletic Hall of Fame in 1996.

He died December 2, 2020, at age 82.
