= 1964 Minnesota Twins season =

1964 Minnesota Twins
- League: American League
- Ballpark: Metropolitan Stadium
- City: Bloomington, Minnesota
- Record: 79–83 (.488)
- Divisional place: 6th
- Owners: Calvin Griffith (majority owner, with Thelma Griffith Haynes)
- General managers: Calvin Griffith
- Managers: Sam Mele
- Television: WTCN-TV
- Radio: 830 WCCO AM (Ray Scott, Herb Carneal, Halsey Hall)

The 1964 Minnesota Twins season was the 4th season for the Minnesota Twins franchise in the Twin Cities of Minnesota, their 4th season at Metropolitan Stadium and the 64th overall in the American League. They failed to improve from the previous two seasons both with 91 wins, and fell to 79–83, a tie for sixth with the Cleveland Indians in the American League, 20 games behind the AL champion New York Yankees.

== Offseason ==
- December 2, 1963: Rudy May was drafted from the Twins by the Chicago White Sox in the 1963 first-year draft.

== Regular season ==
On May 2, in Kansas City, Missouri, Tony Oliva, Bob Allison, Jimmie Hall and Harmon Killebrew hit consecutive 11th-inning home runs, to tie a major league record first set by the Milwaukee Braves in 1961 and duplicated by the Cleveland Indians in 1963. The Twins finished the year with 221 homers, their second-best total ever.

On July 15, new Twin Mudcat Grant allowed thirteen singles and a walk in facing the Washington Senators. None would score, and Grant pitches a shutout, 6–0.

Five Twins made the All-Star Game: first baseman Bob Allison, outfielders Harmon Killebrew, Jimmie Hall and Tony Oliva and pitcher Camilo Pascual.

Tony Oliva became the first black player in the history of the American League to win the AL Rookie of the Year award. He led the major leagues in hits (217), extra base hits and total bases. He led the American League in batting average (.323), runs scored (109) and doubles.

Six Twins hit 20 or more home runs: Harmon Killebrew (49 HR, 111 RBI), Tony Oliva (32 HR, 96 RBI, 109 runs), Bob Allison (32 HR, 86 RBI), Jimmie Hall (25 HR, 75 RBI), Don Mincher (23 HR, 56 RBI), and Zoilo Versalles (20 HR, 94 runs).

Jim Kaat led the Twins with 17 wins and won his third Gold Glove; Camilo Pascual again led the Twins in strikeouts with 213.

1,207,514 fans attended Twins games, the third highest total in the American League.

=== Season standings ===
American League
Team	W	L	Pct.	GB	Home	Road
New York Yankees	99	63	.611	—	50‍–‍31	49‍–‍32
Chicago White Sox	98	64	.605	1	52‍–‍29	46‍–‍35
Baltimore Orioles	97	65	.599	2	49‍–‍32	48‍–‍33
Detroit Tigers	85	77	.525	14	46‍–‍35	39‍–‍42
Los Angeles Angels	82	80	.506	17	45‍–‍36	37‍–‍44
Cleveland Indians	79	83	.488	20	41‍–‍40	38‍–‍43
Minnesota Twins	79	83	.488	20	40‍–‍41	39‍–‍42
Boston Red Sox	72	90	.444	27	45‍–‍36	27‍–‍54
Washington Senators	62	100	.383	37	31‍–‍50	31‍–‍50
Kansas City Athletics	57	105	.352	42	26‍–‍55	31‍–‍50

=== Record vs. opponents ===
1964 American League record Sources:
Team	BAL	BOS	CWS	CLE	DET	KCA	LAA	MIN	NYY	WAS
Baltimore	—	11–7	10–8	8–10	11–7	13–5–1	11–7	10–8	10–8	13–5
Boston	7–11	—	4–14	9–9	5–13	12–6	9–9	5–13	9–9	12–6
Chicago	8–10	14–4	—	12–6	11–7	16–2	10–8	9–9	6–12	12–6
Cleveland	10–8	9–9	6–12	—	11–7	10–8	9–9	10–8–1	3–15–1	11–7
Detroit	7–11	13–5	7–11	7–11	—	11–7	10–8	11–7	8–10–1	11–7
Kansas City	5–13–1	6–12	2–16	8–10	7–11	—	6–12	9–9	6–12	8–10
Los Angeles	7–11	9–9	8–10	9–9	8–10	12–6	—	12–6	7–11	10–8
Minnesota	8–10	13–5	9–9	8–10–1	7–11	9–9	6–12	—	8–10	11–7
New York	8–10	9–9	12–6	15–3–1	10–8–1	12–6	11–7	10–8	—	12–6
Washington	5–13	6–12	6–12	7–11	7–11	10–8	8–10	7–11	6–12	—

=== Notable transactions ===
- June 6, 1964: Andy Kosco was signed as a free agent by the Twins.
- June 24, 1964: Rod Carew was signed as an amateur free agent by the Twins.

=== Roster ===
1964 Minnesota Twins
Roster
Pitchers: 35 Gerry Arrigo; 23 Dave Boswell; 15 Bill Dailey; 21 Gary Dotter; 21 Bill Fischer; 26 Jerry Fosnow; 33 Mudcat Grant; 36 Jim Kaat; 27 Johnny Klippstein; 29 Chuck Nieson; 17 Camilo Pascual; 31 Jim Perry; 19 Bill Pleis; 25,44 Jim Roland; 21 Garland Shifflett; 34 Dwight Siebler; 20 Lee Stange; 18 Dick Stigman; 58 Bill Whitby; 15 Al Worthington	Catchers: 10 Earl Battey; 12 Ron Henry; 12,48 Joe McCabe; 22 Jerry Zimmerman; Infielders: 1 Bernie Allen; 4 Bob Allison; 20 Bill Bethea; 26,49 Bud Bloomfield; 8 Johnny Goryl; 16 Jerry Kindall; 11 Frank Kostro; 5 Don Mincher; 28 Vic Power; 13 Rich Reese; 9 Rich Rollins; 21 Jim Snyder; 2 Zoilo Versalles; 30 Jay Ward	Outfielders: 7 Lenny Green; 30,7 Jimmie Hall; 3 Harmon Killebrew; 16 Joe Nossek; 37,6 Tony Oliva; Other batters: 7 George Banks	Manager: 14 Sam Mele; Coaches: 53 Floyd Baker; 52 Ed Fitz Gerald; 54 Gordon Maltzberger; 51 Hal Naragon

== Player stats ==
= Indicates team leader

=== Batting ===
==== Starters by position ====
Note: Pos = Position; G = Games played; AB = At bats; H = Hits; Avg. = Batting average; HR = Home runs; RBI = Runs batted in

Pos	Player	G	AB	H	Avg.	HR	RBI
C	Earl Battey	131	405	110	.272	12	52
1B	Bob Allison	149	492	141	.287	32	86
2B	Bernie Allen	74	243	52	.214	6	20
3B	Rich Rollins	148	596	161	.270	12	68
SS	Zoilo Versalles	160	659	171	.259	20	64
LF	Harmon Killebrew	158	577	156	.270	49	111
CF	Jimmie Hall	149	510	144	.282	25	75
RF	Tony Oliva	161	672	217	.323	32	94

==== Other batters ====
Note: G = Games played; AB = At bats; H = Hits; Avg. = Batting average; HR = Home runs; RBI = Runs batted in

Player	G	AB	H	Avg.	HR	RBI
Don Mincher	120	287	68	.237	23	56
Jerry Kindall	62	128	19	.148	1	6
Jerry Zimmerman	63	120	24	.200	0	12
Johnny Goryl	58	114	16	.140	0	1
Frank Kostro	59	103	28	.272	3	12
Jim Snyder	26	71	11	.155	1	9
Vic Power	19	45	10	.222	0	1
Ron Henry	22	41	5	.122	2	5
Jay Ward	12	31	7	.226	0	2
Bill Bethea	10	30	5	.167	0	2
Joe McCabe	14	19	3	.158	0	2
Lenny Green	26	15	0	.000	0	0
Bud Bloomfield	7	7	1	.143	0	0
Rich Reese	10	7	0	.000	0	0
Joe Nossek	7	1	0	.000	0	0
George Banks	1	1	0	.000	0	0

=== Pitching ===
==== Starting pitchers ====
Note: G = Games pitched; IP = Innings pitched; W = Wins; L = Losses; ERA = Earned run average; SO = Strikeouts

Player	G	IP	W	L	ERA	SO
Camilo Pascual	36	267.1	15	12	3.30	213
Jim Kaat	36	243.0	17	11	3.22	171
Dick Stigman	32	190.0	6	15	4.03	159
Mudcat Grant	26	166.0	11	9	2.82	75
Lee Stange	14	79.2	3	6	4.74	54
Dave Boswell	4	23.1	2	0	4.24	25

==== Other pitchers ====
Note: G = Games pitched; IP = Innings pitched; W = Wins; L = Losses; ERA = Earned run average; SO = Strikeouts

Player	G	IP	W	L	ERA	SO
Gerry Arrigo	41	105.2	7	4	3.84	96
Jim Roland	30	94.1	2	6	4.10	63

==== Relief pitchers ====
Note: G = Games pitched; W = Wins; L = Losses; SV = Saves; ERA = Earned run average; SO = Strikeouts

Player	G	W	L	SV	ERA	SO
Al Worthington	41	5	6	14	1.37	59
Bill Pleis	47	4	1	4	3.91	42
Jim Perry	42	6	3	2	3.44	55
Johnny Klippstein	33	0	4	2	1.97	39
Bill Dailey	14	1	2	0	8.22	6
Garland Shifflett	10	0	2	1	4.58	8
Dwight Siebler	9	0	0	0	4.91	10
Bill Fischer	9	0	1	0	7.36	2
Jerry Fosnow	7	0	1	0	10.97	9
Bill Whitby	4	0	0	0	8.53	2
Gary Dotter	3	0	0	0	2.08	6
Chuck Nieson	2	0	0	0	4.50	5

== Farm system ==
Level	Team	League	Manager
AAA	Atlanta Crackers	International League	Jack McKeon and Pete Appleton
AA	Charlotte Hornets	Southern League	Al Evans
A	Wilson Tobs	Carolina League	Ralph Rowe
A	Orlando Twins	Florida State League	Harry Warner
A	Wisconsin Rapids Twins	Midwest League	Joe Christian
A	Bismarck-Mandan Pards	Northern League	Vern Morgan
Rookie	Melbourne Twins	Cocoa Rookie League	Fred Waters

LEAGUE CHAMPIONS: Melbourne
