= 1964 Cleveland Indians season =

1964 Cleveland Indians
- League: American League
- Ballpark: Cleveland Municipal Stadium
- City: Cleveland, Ohio
- Owners: Gabe Paul
- General managers: Gabe Paul
- Managers: George Strickland (acting manager through July 2); Birdie Tebbetts
- Television: WJW-TV (Bob Neal, Herb Score)
- Radio: WERE (Jimmy Dudley, Harry Jones)

The 1964 Cleveland Indians season was a season in American baseball. The team finished in a tie for sixth place in the American League with the Minnesota Twins, while winning 79 and losing 83, 20 games behind the AL champion New York Yankees.

== Offseason ==
- Prior to 1964 season: Dave Nelson was signed as an amateur free agent by the Indians.

== Regular season ==
In 1964, Vernon Stouffer became an investor in the Cleveland Indians due to the threat of the franchise relocating.

Manager Birdie Tebbetts suffered a heart attack during the offseason. George Strickland served as the Indians' acting manager during his convalescence. Tebbetts returned to the team on July 3.

=== Season standings ===
American League
Team	W	L	Pct.	GB	Home	Road
New York Yankees	99	63	.611	—	50‍–‍31	49‍–‍32
Chicago White Sox	98	64	.605	1	52‍–‍29	46‍–‍35
Baltimore Orioles	97	65	.599	2	49‍–‍32	48‍–‍33
Detroit Tigers	85	77	.525	14	46‍–‍35	39‍–‍42
Los Angeles Angels	82	80	.506	17	45‍–‍36	37‍–‍44
Cleveland Indians	79	83	.488	20	41‍–‍40	38‍–‍43
Minnesota Twins	79	83	.488	20	40‍–‍41	39‍–‍42
Boston Red Sox	72	90	.444	27	45‍–‍36	27‍–‍54
Washington Senators	62	100	.383	37	31‍–‍50	31‍–‍50
Kansas City Athletics	57	105	.352	42	26‍–‍55	31‍–‍50

=== Record vs. opponents ===
1964 American League record Sources:
Team	BAL	BOS	CWS	CLE	DET	KCA	LAA	MIN	NYY	WAS
Baltimore	—	11–7	10–8	8–10	11–7	13–5–1	11–7	10–8	10–8	13–5
Boston	7–11	—	4–14	9–9	5–13	12–6	9–9	5–13	9–9	12–6
Chicago	8–10	14–4	—	12–6	11–7	16–2	10–8	9–9	6–12	12–6
Cleveland	10–8	9–9	6–12	—	11–7	10–8	9–9	10–8–1	3–15–1	11–7
Detroit	7–11	13–5	7–11	7–11	—	11–7	10–8	11–7	8–10–1	11–7
Kansas City	5–13–1	6–12	2–16	8–10	7–11	—	6–12	9–9	6–12	8–10
Los Angeles	7–11	9–9	8–10	9–9	8–10	12–6	—	12–6	7–11	10–8
Minnesota	8–10	13–5	9–9	8–10–1	7–11	9–9	6–12	—	8–10	11–7
New York	8–10	9–9	12–6	15–3–1	10–8–1	12–6	11–7	10–8	—	12–6
Washington	5–13	6–12	6–12	7–11	7–11	10–8	8–10	7–11	6–12	—

=== Notable transactions ===
- September 5, 1964: Pedro Ramos was traded by the Indians to the New York Yankees for players to be named later and $75,000. The Yankees completed the deal by sending Ralph Terry to the Indians on October 21 and Bud Daley to the Indians on November 27.

=== Opening Day Lineup ===
Opening Day Starters
#	Name	Position
18	Dick Howser	SS
25	Vic Davalillo	CF
27	Leon Wagner	LF
10	Max Alvis	3B
15	Fred Whitfield	1B
24	Tito Francona	RF
7	Johnny Romano	C
12	Woodie Held	2B
33	Mudcat Grant	P

=== Roster ===
1964 Cleveland Indians
Roster
Pitchers: 36 Ted Abernathy; 39 Gary Bell; 30 Dick Donovan; 33 Mudcat Grant; 37 Tommy John; 45 Tom Kelley; 31 Jack Kralick; 48 Sam McDowell; 44 Don McMahon; 35 Pedro Ramos; 43 Gordon Seyfried; 42 Sonny Siebert; 43 Lee Stange; 33 Luis Tiant; 48 Jerry Walker	Catchers: 6 Joe Azcue; 7 Johnny Romano; 8 Duke Sims; Infielders: 10 Max Alvis; 16 Larry Brown; 21 Bob Chance; 12 Woodie Held; 18 Dick Howser; 14 Jerry Kindall; 18 Tony Martínez; 11 Billy Moran; 15 Fred Whitfield	Outfielders: 28 Tommie Agee; 9 George Banks; 25 Vic Davalillo; 24 Tito Francona; 22 Al Luplow; 20 Wally Post; 26,17 Chico Salmon; 28 Al Smith; 27 Leon Wagner; Other batters: 29,20 Paul Dicken; 13 Vern Fuller	Manager: 3 George Strickland (acting); 1 Birdie Tebbetts; Coaches: 5 Solly Hemus (Third Base); 3 George Strickland; 4 Elmer Valo (First Base); 2 Early Wynn (Pitching)

== Game log ==
=== Regular season ===
1964 regular season game log: 79–83–2 (Home: 41–40–1; Away: 38–43–1)
April: 6–3 (Home: 1–1; Away: 5–2)

#	Date	Time (ET)	Opponent	Score	Win	Loss	Save	Time of Game	Attendance	Record	Box/ Streak

May: 15–13 (Home: 7–5; Away: 8–8)

#	Date	Time (ET)	Opponent	Score	Win	Loss	Save	Time of Game	Attendance	Record	Box/ Streak
17	May 8		Yankees	3–10						11–6	
18	May 9		Yankees	2–6						11–7	
19	May 10		Yankees	2–12						11–8	
20	May 10		Yankees	2–3 (10)						11–9	
32	May 26		@ Yankees	2–3						18–14	
33	May 27		@ Yankees	2–7						18–15	

June: 12–21–1 (Home: 9–13; Away: 3–8–1)

#	Date	Time (ET)	Opponent	Score	Win	Loss	Save	Time of Game	Attendance	Record	Box/ Streak

July: 12–20–1 (Home: 4–7–1; Away: 8–13)

#	Date	Time (ET)	Opponent	Score	Win	Loss	Save	Time of Game	Attendance	Record	Box/ Streak
ASG	July 7	1:00 p.m. EDT	35th All-Star Game in Queens, NY	7 – 4 AL	—	—	—	2:37	50,850	—	ASG
82	July 12		Yankees	2–2 (7)						35–45–2	
—	July 12		Yankees	**Postponed (Rain)** (Makeup date: September 22)							
83	July 13		Yankees	4–10						35–46–2	
88	July 17		@ Yankees	4–8						37–49–2	
89	July 18		@ Yankees	6–4 (15)						38–49–2	
90	July 19 (1)		@ Yankees	2–6						38–50–2	
91	July 19 (2)		@ Yankees	3–0						39–50–2	

August: 20–10 (Home: 4–7; Away: 8–13)

#	Date	Time (ET)	Opponent	Score	Win	Loss	Save	Time of Game	Attendance	Record	Box/ Streak

September: 13–13 (Home: 6–9; Away: 7–4)

#	Date	Time (ET)	Opponent	Score	Win	Loss	Save	Time of Game	Attendance	Record	Box/ Streak
152	September 22 (1)		Yankees	3–5						76–74–2	
153	September 22 (2)		Yankees	1–8						76–75–2	
154	September 23 (1)		Yankees	3–4 (11)						76–76–2	
155	September 23 (2)		Yankees	4–6						76–77–2	

October: 1–3 (Home: 0–0; Away: 1–3)

#	Date	Time (ET)	Opponent	Score	Win	Loss	Save	Time of Game	Attendance	Record	Box/ Streak
162	October 2		@ Yankees	2–5						78–82–2	
163	October 3		@ Yankees	3–8						78–83–2	
164	October 4		@ Yankees	2–1 (13)						79–83–2	

Legend: = Win = Loss = Eliminated from playoff race = Postponement
Bold = Indians team member

=== Detailed records ===
**American League**
Opponent	Home	Away	Total	Pct.	Runs scored	Runs allowed
**Cleveland Indians**	—	—	—	—	—	—
New York Yankees	0–9	3–6	3–15	.167	52	108
**Season Total**	**0–9**	**3–6**	**3–15**	**.167**	**52**	**108**

== Player stats ==
=== Batting ===
==== Starters by position ====
Note: Pos = Position; G = Games played; AB = At bats; H = Hits; Avg. = Batting average; HR = Home runs; RBI = Runs batted in

Pos	Player	G	AB	H	Avg.	HR	RBI
C	Johnny Romano	106	352	85	.241	19	47
1B	Bob Chance	120	390	109	.279	14	75
2B	Larry Brown	115	335	77	.230	12	40
3B	Max Alvis	107	381	96	.252	18	53
SS	Dick Howser	162	637	163	.256	3	52
LF	Leon Wagner	163	641	162	.253	31	100
CF	Vic Davalillo	150	577	156	.270	6	51
RF	Tito Francona	111	270	67	.248	8	24

==== Other batters ====
Note: G = Games played; AB = At bats; H = Hits; Avg. = Batting average; HR = Home runs; RBI = Runs batted in

Player	G	AB	H	Avg.	HR	RBI
Woodie Held	118	364	86	.236	18	49
Fred Whitfield	101	293	79	.270	10	29
Chico Salmon	86	283	87	.307	4	25
Joe Azcue	83	271	74	.273	4	34
Billy Moran	69	151	31	.205	1	10
Al Smith	61	136	22	.162	4	9
Jerry Kindall	23	25	9	.360	2	2
Al Luplow	19	18	2	.111	0	1
George Banks	9	17	5	.294	2	3
Tony Martínez	9	14	3	.214	0	2
Tommie Agee	13	12	2	.167	0	0
Paul Dicken	11	11	0	.000	0	0
Wally Post	5	8	0	.000	0	0
Duke Sims	2	6	0	.000	0	0
Vern Fuller	2	1	0	.000	0	0

=== Pitching ===
==== Starting pitchers ====
Note: G = Games pitched; IP = Innings pitched; W = Wins; L = Losses; ERA = Earned run average; SO = Strikeouts

Player	G	IP	W	L	ERA	SO
Jack Kralick	30	190.2	12	7	3.21	119
Sam McDowell	31	173.1	11	6	2.70	177
Dick Donovan	30	158.1	7	9	4.55	83
Luis Tiant	19	127.0	10	4	2.83	105

==== Other pitchers ====
Note: G = Games pitched; IP = Innings pitched; W = Wins; L = Losses; ERA = Earned run average; SO = Strikeouts

Player	G	IP	W	L	ERA	SO
Sonny Siebert	41	156.0	7	9	3.23	144
Pedro Ramos	36	133.0	7	10	5.14	98
Tommy John	25	94.1	2	9	3.91	65
Lee Stange	23	91.2	4	8	4.12	78
Mudcat Grant	13	62.0	3	4	5.95	43

==== Relief pitchers ====
Note: G = Games pitched; W = Wins; L = Losses; SV = Saves; ERA = Earned run average; SO = Strikeouts

Player	G	W	L	SV	ERA	SO
Don McMahon	70	6	4	16	2.41	92
Ted Abernathy	53	2	6	11	4.33	57
Gary Bell	56	8	6	4	4.33	89
Jerry Walker	6	0	1	0	4.66	5
Tom Kelley	6	0	0	0	5.59	7
Gordon Seyfried	2	0	0	0	0.00	0

== Farm system ==
Level	Team	League	Manager
AAA	Portland Beavers	Pacific Coast League	Johnny Lipon
AA	Charleston Indians	Eastern League	Bob Nieman
A	Burlington Indians	Carolina League	Bill Herring
A	Dubuque Packers	Midwest League	Walt Novick

== Awards ==
- Vic Davalillo, Gold Glove Award
