= 1964 New York Yankees season =

Season for the Major League Baseball team the New York Yankees

1964 New York Yankees
- American League champions
- League: American League
- Ballpark: Yankee Stadium
- City: New York City
- Record: 99–63 (.611)
- League place: 1st
- Owners: Dan Topping and Del Webb
- General managers: Ralph Houk
- Managers: Yogi Berra
- Television: WPIX (Mel Allen, Red Barber, Phil Rizzuto, Jerry Coleman)
- Radio: WCBS (AM) (Mel Allen, Red Barber, Phil Rizzuto, Jerry Coleman)

The 1964 New York Yankees season was the 62nd season for the franchise. The defending American League champions finished at 99–63 (.611), winning their 29th pennant, a game ahead of the Chicago White Sox and two ahead of the Baltimore Orioles. New York was managed by its former catcher Yogi Berra and played at Yankee Stadium. In the World Series, they were defeated by the St. Louis Cardinals in seven games, which was the Yankees' last postseason appearance until 1976.

Taking over as manager from Ralph Houk, who moved up to general manager, Berra had a difficult early season, with many veterans missing games due to injury. Doubts about his ability to manage his former teammates were brought into the open with the Harmonica Incident in late August, in which he clashed with utility infielder Phil Linz on the team bus following a sweep by the White Sox that appeared to have removed the Yankees from pennant contention. The team rallied behind Berra afterwards, going 22–6 (.786) in September, and won the pennant. However the incident may have convinced the team's executives to replace Berra with Johnny Keane, manager of the victorious Cardinals, after the season.

This season is considered to be the endpoint of the "Old Yankees" dynasty that had begun with the Ruppert–Huston partnership and then continued with the Topping–Webb partnership. The Yankees soon underwent ownership changes and front office turmoil, and were not a serious factor in the pennant chase again until the mid-1970s. For television viewers and radio listeners, the sudden removal of Mel Allen following that season marked the end of an era of Yankees television and radio broadcasts.

After the season in early November, CBS acquired eighty percent ownership of the Yankees for $11.2 million, with an option to gain the remainder from Topping and Webb within five years. Four months later, Webb sold his ten percent of the club to CBS for $1.4 million; Topping held onto his ten percent until September 1966.

== Offseason ==
- November 30, 1963: Marshall Bridges was purchased from the Yankees by the Washington Senators.

== Regular season ==
On September 26, Mel Stottlemyre went 5 for 5, drove in two runs, and threw a two-hit shutout.

=== Season standings ===
American League
Team	W	L	Pct.	GB	Home	Road
New York Yankees	99	63	.611	—	50‍–‍31	49‍–‍32
Chicago White Sox	98	64	.605	1	52‍–‍29	46‍–‍35
Baltimore Orioles	97	65	.599	2	49‍–‍32	48‍–‍33
Detroit Tigers	85	77	.525	14	46‍–‍35	39‍–‍42
Los Angeles Angels	82	80	.506	17	45‍–‍36	37‍–‍44
Cleveland Indians	79	83	.488	20	41‍–‍40	38‍–‍43
Minnesota Twins	79	83	.488	20	40‍–‍41	39‍–‍42
Boston Red Sox	72	90	.444	27	45‍–‍36	27‍–‍54
Washington Senators	62	100	.383	37	31‍–‍50	31‍–‍50
Kansas City Athletics	57	105	.352	42	26‍–‍55	31‍–‍50

=== Record vs. opponents ===
1964 American League record Sources:
Team	BAL	BOS	CWS	CLE	DET	KCA	LAA	MIN	NYY	WAS
Baltimore	—	11–7	10–8	8–10	11–7	13–5–1	11–7	10–8	10–8	13–5
Boston	7–11	—	4–14	9–9	5–13	12–6	9–9	5–13	9–9	12–6
Chicago	8–10	14–4	—	12–6	11–7	16–2	10–8	9–9	6–12	12–6
Cleveland	10–8	9–9	6–12	—	11–7	10–8	9–9	10–8–1	3–15–1	11–7
Detroit	7–11	13–5	7–11	7–11	—	11–7	10–8	11–7	8–10–1	11–7
Kansas City	5–13–1	6–12	2–16	8–10	7–11	—	6–12	9–9	6–12	8–10
Los Angeles	7–11	9–9	8–10	9–9	8–10	12–6	—	12–6	7–11	10–8
Minnesota	8–10	13–5	9–9	8–10–1	7–11	9–9	6–12	—	8–10	11–7
New York	8–10	9–9	12–6	15–3–1	10–8–1	12–6	11–7	10–8	—	12–6
Washington	5–13	6–12	6–12	7–11	7–11	10–8	8–10	7–11	6–12	—

=== Notable transactions ===
- September 5, 1964: The Yankees traded players to be named later and $75,000 to the Cleveland Indians for Pedro Ramos. The Yankees completed the trade by sending Ralph Terry to the Indians on October 21 and Bud Daley to the Indians on November 27.

=== Roster ===
1964 New York Yankees
Roster
Pitchers: 56 Jim Bouton; 28 Bud Daley; 24 Al Downing; 16 Whitey Ford; 39 Steve Hamilton; 49 Bob Meyer; 51 Pete Mikkelsen; 14 Pedro Ramos; 18 Hal Reniff; 45 Rollie Sheldon; 22 Bill Stafford; 30 Mel Stottlemyre; 23 Ralph Terry; 19 Stan Williams	Catchers: 38 Johnny Blanchard; 41 Jake Gibbs; 32 Elston Howard; Infielders: 6 Clete Boyer; 14 Harry Bright; 42 Pedro González; 12 Mike Hegan; 10 Tony Kubek; 34 Phil Linz; 25 Joe Pepitone; 1 Bobby Richardson	Outfielders: 48 Elvio Jiménez; 11 Héctor López; 7 Mickey Mantle; 9 Roger Maris; 26 Archie Moore; 43 Roger Repoz; 15 Tom Tresh	Manager: 8 Yogi Berra; Coaches: 2 Frankie Crosetti; 16 Whitey Ford; 31 Jim Gleeson; 44 Jim Hegan

== Player stats ==
= Indicates team leader

= Indicates league leader

=== Batting ===
==== Starters by position ====
Note: Pos = Position; G = Games played; AB = At bats; R = Runs; H = Hits; Avg. = Batting average; HR = Home runs; RBI = Runs batted in; SB = Stolen bases

Pos	Player	G	AB	R	H	Avg.	HR	RBI	SB
C	Elston Howard	150	550	63	172	.313	15	84	1
1B	Joe Pepitone	160	613	71	154	.251	28	100	2
2B	Bobby Richardson	159	679	90	181	.267	4	50	11
3B	Clete Boyer	147	510	43	111	.218	8	52	6
SS	Tony Kubek	106	415	46	95	.229	8	31	4
LF	Tom Tresh	153	533	75	131	.246	16	73	13
CF	Mickey Mantle	143	465	92	141	.303	35	111	6
RF	Roger Maris	141	513	86	144	.281	26	71	3

==== Other batters ====
Note: G = Games played; AB = At bats; H = Hits; Avg. = Batting average; HR = Home runs; RBI = Runs batted in

Player	G	AB	H	Avg.	HR	RBI
Phil Linz	112	368	92	.250	5	25
Héctor López	127	285	74	.260	10	34
Johnny Blanchard	77	161	41	.255	7	28
Pedro González	80	112	31	.277	0	5
Archie Moore	31	23	4	.174	0	1
Jake Gibbs	3	6	1	.167	0	0
Elvio Jimenez	1	6	2	.333	0	0
Harry Bright	4	5	1	.200	0	0
Mike Hegan	5	5	0	.000	0	0
Roger Repoz	11	1	0	.000	0	0

=== Pitching ===
= Indicates league leader

==== Starting pitchers ====
Note: G = Games pitched; IP = Innings pitched; W = Wins; L = Losses; ERA = Earned run average; SO = Strikeouts

Player	G	IP	W	L	ERA	SO
Jim Bouton	38	271.1	18	13	3.02	125
Whitey Ford	39	244.2	17	6	2.13	172
Al Downing	37	244.0	13	8	3.47	217
Mel Stottlemyre	13	96.0	9	3	2.06	49

==== Other pitchers ====
Note: G = Games pitched; IP = Innings pitched; W = Wins; L = Losses; ERA = Earned run average; SO = Strikeouts

Player	G	IP	W	L	ERA	SO
Ralph Terry	27	114.0	7	11	4.54	77
Rollie Sheldon	19	102.1	5	2	3.61	57
Stan Williams	21	82.0	1	5	3.84	54
Bud Daley	13	35.0	3	2	4.63	16

==== Relief pitchers ====
Note: G = Games pitched; W = Wins; L = Losses; SV = Saves; ERA = Earned run average; SO = Strikeouts

Player	G	W	L	SV	ERA	SO
Pete Mikkelsen	50	7	4	12	3.56	63
Hal Reniff	41	6	4	9	3.12	38
Bill Stafford	31	5	0	4	2.67	39
Steve Hamilton	30	7	2	3	3.28	49
Pedro Ramos	13	1	0	8	1.25	21
Bob Meyer	7	0	3	0	4.91	12

== 1964 World Series ==
With this 4–3 World Series victory, the Cardinals gained a 3–2 edge in overall Series wins over the Yankees, the first time any team had an overall edge against the Yankees since the 1920s. As of today, the Cardinals remain the only one of the "classic eight" National League teams to hold an edge over the Yankees.

NL St. Louis Cardinals (4) vs. AL New York Yankees (3)
Game	Score	Date	Location	Attendance	Time of game
1	Yankees – 5, Cardinals – 9	October 7	Busch Stadium I	30,805	2:42
2	Yankees – 8, Cardinals – 3	October 8	Busch Stadium I	30,805	2:29
3	Cardinals – 1, Yankees – 2	October 10	Yankee Stadium	67,101	2:16
4	Cardinals – 4, Yankees – 3	October 11	Yankee Stadium	66,312	2:18
5	Cardinals – 5, Yankees – 2	October 12	Yankee Stadium	65,633	2:37
6	Yankees – 8, Cardinals – 3	October 14	Busch Stadium I	30,805	2:37
7	Yankees – 5, Cardinals – 7	October 15	Busch Stadium I	30,346	2:40

== Awards and honors ==
- Elston Howard, Gold Glove
- 1964 MLB All-Star Game
  - Whitey Ford, All-Star Game
  - Elston Howard, All-Star Game
  - Mickey Mantle, All-Star Game
  - Joe Pepitone, All-Star Game
  - Bobby Richardson, All-Star Game

== Farm system ==
Level	Team	League	Manager
AAA	Richmond Virginians	International League	Preston Gómez
AA	Columbus Confederate Yankees	Southern League	Rube Walker
A	Greensboro Yankees	Carolina League	Loren Babe
A	Fort Lauderdale Yankees	Florida State League	Frank Verdi
A	Shelby Yankees	Western Carolinas League	Gary Blaylock
Rookie	Johnson City Yankees	Appalachian League	Lamar North
Rookie	SRL Yankees	Sarasota Rookie League	Billy Shantz

LEAGUE CHAMPIONS: Fort Lauderdale, Johnson City
