= Garland Shifflett =

American baseball player (1935–2020)

- Pitcher
- Born: March 28, 1935; Elkton, Virginia, U.S.
- Died: May 13, 2020 (aged 85); Lakewood, Colorado, U.S.
- Batted: Right Threw: Right

MLB debut
- April 22, 1957, for the Washington Senators

Last MLB appearance
- June 26, 1964, for the Minnesota Twins

MLB statistics
- Win–loss record: 0–2
- Earned run average: 6.31
- Strikeouts: 10
- Stats at Baseball Reference

Teams
- Washington Senators (1957); Minnesota Twins (1964)

Garland Jessie Shifflett (March 28, 1935 – May 13, 2020) was an American professional baseball player. A right-handed pitcher born in Elkton, Virginia, Shifflett's 18-year professional career was spent almost exclusively in minor league baseball; the first 16 of those years were spent in one major league organization, with the Washington Senators/Minnesota Twins. He stood 5 feet 10 inches (1.78 m) tall and weighed 165 pounds (75 kg).

Shifflett had two MLB trials, with the 1957 Senators and the 1964 Twins, appearing in 16 games (all but one in relief) and going winless with two defeats. During his minor league career, from 1955 to 1972, however, Shifflett won 144 games, lost 117 and compiled a 3.14 earned run average in 2,173 innings pitched and 707 appearances. He was a longtime member of the Charlotte Hornets, pitching for them in 11 of his pro seasons (1956–58; 1960; 1962–68).

Shifflett died on May 13, 2020, in Lakewood, Colorado.
