= 1964 Detroit Tigers season =

Major League Baseball season

1964 Detroit Tigers
- League: American League
- Ballpark: Tiger Stadium
- City: Detroit, Michigan
- Record: 85–77 (.525)
- League place: 4th
- Owners: John Fetzer
- General managers: Jim Campbell
- Managers: Chuck Dressen
- Television: WJBK
- Radio: WKMH; WWJ; WJR (Ernie Harwell, Bob Scheffing)

The 1964 Detroit Tigers season was the team's 64th season and the 53rd season at Tiger Stadium. The team finished fourth in the American League with a record of 85–77, 14 games behind the New York Yankees.

== Offseason ==
- December 2, 1963: Howie Koplitz was drafted from the Tigers by the Washington Senators in the 1963 rule 5 draft.
- December 5, 1963: Gus Triandos and Jim Bunning were traded by the Tigers to the Philadelphia Phillies for Don Demeter and Jack Hamilton.
- March 18, 1964: Don Mossi was purchased from the Tigers by the Chicago White Sox.

== Regular season ==
=== Season standings ===
American League
Team	W	L	Pct.	GB	Home	Road
New York Yankees	99	63	.611	—	50‍–‍31	49‍–‍32
Chicago White Sox	98	64	.605	1	52‍–‍29	46‍–‍35
Baltimore Orioles	97	65	.599	2	49‍–‍32	48‍–‍33
Detroit Tigers	85	77	.525	14	46‍–‍35	39‍–‍42
Los Angeles Angels	82	80	.506	17	45‍–‍36	37‍–‍44
Cleveland Indians	79	83	.488	20	41‍–‍40	38‍–‍43
Minnesota Twins	79	83	.488	20	40‍–‍41	39‍–‍42
Boston Red Sox	72	90	.444	27	45‍–‍36	27‍–‍54
Washington Senators	62	100	.383	37	31‍–‍50	31‍–‍50
Kansas City Athletics	57	105	.352	42	26‍–‍55	31‍–‍50

=== Record vs. opponents ===
1964 American League record Sources:
Team	BAL	BOS	CWS	CLE	DET	KCA	LAA	MIN	NYY	WAS
Baltimore	—	11–7	10–8	8–10	11–7	13–5–1	11–7	10–8	10–8	13–5
Boston	7–11	—	4–14	9–9	5–13	12–6	9–9	5–13	9–9	12–6
Chicago	8–10	14–4	—	12–6	11–7	16–2	10–8	9–9	6–12	12–6
Cleveland	10–8	9–9	6–12	—	11–7	10–8	9–9	10–8–1	3–15–1	11–7
Detroit	7–11	13–5	7–11	7–11	—	11–7	10–8	11–7	8–10–1	11–7
Kansas City	5–13–1	6–12	2–16	8–10	7–11	—	6–12	9–9	6–12	8–10
Los Angeles	7–11	9–9	8–10	9–9	8–10	12–6	—	12–6	7–11	10–8
Minnesota	8–10	13–5	9–9	8–10–1	7–11	9–9	6–12	—	8–10	11–7
New York	8–10	9–9	12–6	15–3–1	10–8–1	12–6	11–7	10–8	—	12–6
Washington	5–13	6–12	6–12	7–11	7–11	10–8	8–10	7–11	6–12	—

=== Notable transitions ===
Andy Kosco was released by the Tigers on June 3, 1964. On September 16, 1964, Dick Drago was signed as an amateur free agent. After playing in 106 games during his fourth season with the Tigers, outfielder Bill Bruton retired.

=== Roster ===
1964 Detroit Tigers
Roster
Pitchers: 21,37 Hank Aguirre; 41 Dick Egan; 13 Bill Faul; 44 Fritz Fisher; 18 Terry Fox; 20 Fred Gladding; 48 Jack Hamilton; 42 Alan Koch; 17 Frank Lary; 29 Mickey Lolich; 17 Denny McLain; 33,42 Julio Navarro; 19 Ed Rakow; 16 Phil Regan; 39 Johnnie Seale; 15 Larry Sherry; 21 Joe Sparma; 14 Dave Wickersham	Catchers: 11 Bill Freehan; 12 Mike Roarke; 36 John Sullivan; Infielders: 25 Norm Cash; 9 Jerry Lumpe; 3 Dick McAuliffe; 1 Bubba Phillips; 37 Bill Roman; 40 George Smith; 8 Don Wert; 2 Jake Wood	Outfielders: 26 Gates Brown; 38 Bill Bruton; 4 Don Demeter; 23 Willie Horton; 6 Al Kaline; 45 Jim Northrup; 49 Mickey Stanley; 24 George Thomas	Manager: 7 Chuck Dressen; Coaches: 54 Wayne Blackburn; 52 Pat Mullin; 53 Stubby Overmire; 51 Bob Swift

== Player stats ==
=== Batting ===
==== Starters by position ====
Note: Pos = Position; G = Games played; AB = At bats; H = Hits; Avg. = Batting average; HR = Home runs; RBI = Runs batted in

Pos	Player	G	AB	H	Avg.	HR	RBI
C	Bill Freehan	144	520	156	.300	18	80
1B	Norm Cash	144	479	123	.257	23	83
2B	Jerry Lumpe	158	624	160	.256	6	46
3B	Don Wert	148	525	135	.257	9	55
SS	Dick McAuliffe	162	557	134	.241	24	66
LF	Gates Brown	123	426	116	.272	15	54
CF	Bill Bruton	106	296	82	.277	5	33
RF	Al Kaline	146	525	154	.293	17	68

==== Other batters ====
Note: G = Games played; AB = At bats; H = Hits; Avg. = Batting average; HR = Home runs; RBI = Runs batted in

Player	G	AB	H	Avg.	HR	RBI
Don Demeter	134	441	113	.256	22	80
George Thomas	105	308	88	.286	12	44
Jake Wood	64	125	29	.232	1	7
Bubba Phillips	46	87	22	.253	3	6
Mike Roarke	29	82	19	.232	0	7
Willie Horton	25	80	13	.163	1	10
Jim Northrup	5	12	1	.083	0	0
Mickey Stanley	4	11	3	.273	0	1
Bill Roman	3	8	3	.375	1	1
George Smith	5	7	2	.286	0	2
John Sullivan	2	3	0	.000	0	0

=== Pitching ===
==== Starting pitchers ====
Note: G = Games pitched; IP = Innings pitched; W = Wins; L = Losses; ERA = Earned run average; SO = Strikeouts

Player	G	IP	W	L	ERA	SO
Dave Wickersham	40	254.0	19	12	3.44	164
Mickey Lolich	44	232.0	18	9	3.26	192
Hank Aguirre	32	161.2	5	10	3.79	88
Denny McLain	19	100.0	4	5	4.05	70
Bill Faul	1	5.0	0	0	10.80	1

==== Other pitchers ====
Note: G = Games pitched; IP = Innings pitched; W = Wins; L = Losses; ERA = Earned run average; SO = Strikeouts

Player	G	IP	W	L	ERA	SO
Ed Rakow	42	152.1	8	9	3.72	96
Phil Regan	32	146.2	5	10	5.03	91
Joe Sparma	21	84.0	5	6	3.00	71
Frank Lary	6	18.0	0	2	7.00	6
Jack Hamilton	5	15.0	0	1	8.40	5

==== Relief pitchers ====
Note: G = Games pitched; W = Wins; L = Losses; SV = Saves; ERA = Earned run average; SO = Strikeouts

Player	G	W	L	SV	ERA	SO
Larry Sherry	38	7	5	11	3.66	58
Fred Gladding	42	7	4	7	3.07	59
Terry Fox	32	4	3	5	3.39	28
Julio Navarro	26	2	1	2	3.95	36
Dick Egan	23	0	0	2	4.46	21
Johnnie Seale	4	1	0	0	3.60	5
Alan Koch	3	0	0	0	6.75	1
Fritz Fisher	1	0	0	0	108.00	1

== Farm system ==
Level	Team	League	Manager
AAA	Syracuse Chiefs	International League	Frank Carswell
AA	Knoxville Smokies	Southern League	Bob Mavis
A	Lakeland Tigers	Florida State League	Al Federoff
A	Jamestown Tigers	New York–Penn League	Jack Phillips
A	Duluth–Superior Dukes	Northern League	Gail Henley
Rookie	Cocoa Tigers	Cocoa Rookie League	Doc Daugherty
