= Pete Charton =

American baseball player (born 1942)

- Pitcher
- Born: December 21, 1942 (age 82); Jackson, Tennessee, U.S.
- Batted: Left Threw: Right

MLB debut
- April 19, 1964, for the Boston Red Sox

Last MLB appearance
- September 30, 1964, for the Boston Red Sox

MLB statistics
- Win–loss record: 0–2
- Earned run average: 5.26
- Strikeouts: 37
- Stats at Baseball Reference

Teams
- Boston Red Sox (1964)

Frank Lane "Pete" Charton (born December 21, 1942) is an American former Major League Baseball pitcher. Born in Jackson, Tennessee, he batted left-handed and threw right-handed, stood 6 feet 2 inches (1.88 m) tall and weighed 190 pounds (86 kg).

Charton was signed in 1963 by the Boston Red Sox as a free agent out of the Baylor University. He spent the entire 1964 season on Boston's Major League roster to prevent him from being claimed by another team in the first-year player draft of the time. In a 25-game MLB career, Charton posted a 0–2 record with 37 strikeouts and a 5.26 ERA in 65.0 innings pitched, including five starts and 14 games finished.

After baseball, he finished college, ultimately receiving his PhD in geology from Michigan State University. He taught for a couple of years at the University of Illinois before moving on to Roane State Community College in Harriman, Tennessee, where he taught for 35 years and had an endowment scholarship named in his honor. He is also the author of the Christian devotional, "Off to College with King Solomon: A Devotional Handbook for Beginning College Students". (2012)
