= Frank Kreutzer =

American baseball pitcher (born 1939)

- Pitcher
- Born: February 7, 1939 (age 87); Buffalo, New York, U.S.
- Batted: Right Threw: Left

MLB debut
- September 20, 1962, for the Chicago White Sox

Last MLB appearance
- May 12, 1969, for the Washington Senators

MLB statistics
- Win–loss record: 8–18
- Earned run average: 4.40
- Strikeouts: 151
- Stats at Baseball Reference

Teams
- Chicago White Sox (1962–1964); Washington Senators (1964–1966, 1969)

Franklin James Kreutzer (born February 7, 1939) is an American former Major League Baseball pitcher who appeared in 78 games over all or part of six seasons with the Chicago White Sox (1962–1964) and Washington Senators (1964–1966 and 1969). A left-hander from Buffalo, New York, Kreutzer stood 6 feet 1 inch (1.85 m) tall and weighed 175 pounds (79 kg).

Kreutzer attended Villanova University and began his nine-year professional career in 1961 in the Boston Red Sox' organization. That November, he was selected by the White Sox in the first-year player draft then in force. He made his MLB debut on September 20, 1962, throwing 11/3 innings of shutout relief against the Red Sox at Comiskey Park. He also pitched for the White Sox in 18 other contests through July 15, 1964. Thirteen days later, he was the "player to be named later" to complete a July 13 deal in which Chicago acquired first baseman Bill Skowron from Washington for Joe Cunningham.

The 1965 campaign was Kreutzer's only full season in the majors. His best career outing came on July 2 of that year, when he threw a three-hit, ten-strikeout complete game shutout against the Detroit Tigers while hitting a two-run home run of his own. The Senators triumphed, 6–0.

Of Kreutzer's 78 big-league games, 32 were starts; the July 1965 shutout of the Tigers was his only white-washing as a big leaguer. He posted an 8–18 career won–lost mark, one save, two complete games, and a 4.40 earned run average. In 2102/3 innings pitched, he permitted 194 hits and 109 bases on balls, with 151 strikeouts.
