= Birdie Tebbetts =

American baseball player, coach, manager (1912–1999)

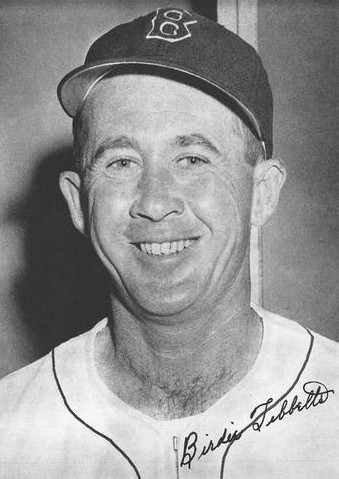
- Tebbetts in 1947
- Catcher / Manager
- Born: November 10, 1912; Burlington, Vermont, U.S.
- Died: March 24, 1999 (aged 86); Bradenton Beach, Florida, U.S.
- Batted: Right Threw: Right

MLB debut
- September 16, 1936, for the Detroit Tigers

Last MLB appearance
- September 14, 1952, for the Cleveland Indians

MLB statistics
- Batting average: .270
- Home runs: 38
- Runs batted in: 469
- Managerial record: 748–705
- Winning %: .515
- Stats at Baseball Reference
- Managerial record at Baseball Reference

Teams
- As player: Detroit Tigers (1936–1942, 1946–1947); Boston Red Sox (1947–1950); Cleveland Indians (1951–1952); As manager: Cincinnati Redlegs (1954–1958); Milwaukee Braves (1961–1962); Cleveland Indians (1963–1966)

Career highlights and awards
- 4× All-Star (1941, 1942, 1948, 1949)

George Robert "Birdie" Tebbetts (November 10, 1912 – March 24, 1999) was an American professional baseball player, manager, scout and front office executive. He played in Major League Baseball (MLB) as a catcher for the Detroit Tigers, Boston Red Sox and the Cleveland Indians from 1936 to 1952. Tebbetts was regarded as the best catcher in the American League in the late 1940s.

Although he lacked speed and did not hit for power, Tebbetts was an exceptional defensive catcher and intelligent player who capably directed his pitchers. These traits served him well later in his career, as he became the manager for the Cincinnati Reds, Milwaukee Braves and the Cleveland Indians. His major league career encompassed 14 years as a catcher, 11 as a manager and 28 as a scout.

== Early life ==
Tebbetts was born in Burlington, Vermont, but his family moved to Nashua, New Hampshire a few months after he was born. Shortly thereafter, his father died, leaving his mother to raise the family. Some reports state that Tebbetts acquired his nickname as a boy after an aunt observed that his voice sounded like a bird chirping, while other reports state the nickname was acquired while attending Providence College. Tebbetts was a bat boy for the Nashua Millionaires as a child, also serving as a catcher for pitchers warming up.

Tebbetts was a star athlete at Nashua High School where he attained All-State status as a football quarterback and as a baseball catcher. He signed a contract with the Detroit Tigers after they agreed to pay his college tuition. He attended Providence College where he became an All-American in baseball before graduating with a degree in philosophy in 1934. He also suffered an appendicitis in college, causing him to miss several months of baseball.

== Baseball career ==
The Tigers purchased future Hall of Fame catcher Mickey Cochrane from the Philadelphia Athletics in December 1933, leaving no place for Tebbetts on the team. He spent the next three seasons playing in the minor leagues before making his MLB debut with the Tigers on September 16, 1936 at the age of 23. In the 1937 season, Cochrane's playing career came to an end when he was hit by a pitch and suffered a fractured skull. Rudy York replaced Cochrane as the Tigers' catcher, but his defensive skills were so poor that by the 1939 season, new Tigers manager Del Baker gave Tebbetts a chance to play. Tebbetts ended the season with a .261 batting average and led American League (AL) catchers in assists and in baserunners caught stealing.

In 1940, York was converted into a first baseman, leaving Tebbetts in sole possession of the catcher's position. He responded by posting a .296 batting average, as the Tigers defeated the Cleveland Indians and the New York Yankees in a tight pennant race to clinch the American League title. Tebbetts was held hitless in the 1940 World Series as the Tigers lost to the Cincinnati Reds in a seven-game series. He once again led AL catchers in assists and in baserunners caught stealing. In September, Tebbetts had been charged with assault and battery during a game in Cleveland when a basket of tomatoes was dropped on him by a Cleveland fan. As police held the fan, Tebbetts rushed up and struck him. The charges were later dismissed.

Tebbetts developed a reputation for antagonizing opposing players, constantly heckling them in an effort to have them make mistakes and give his team an advantage. However, he also could be a good sport. In his autobiography, Tebbetts said he and catcher Mike Tresh helped umpire Red Ormbsy call balls and strikes during a game when Ormsby suffered from a dizzy spell. Tebbetts tipped Ormsby off with hand signals following each pitch.

In 1941, Tebbetts was hitting for a .296 average by mid-season and earned a place as a reserve player for the American League in the 1941 All-Star Game. He led American League catchers in assists for a third consecutive year. Tebbetts was named the starting catcher for the American League in the 1942 All-Star Game.

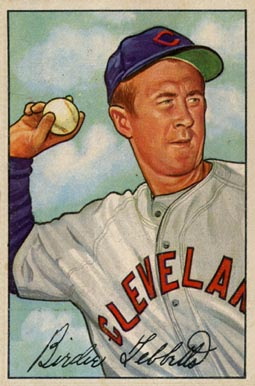
A 1952 Bowman Gum card of Tebbetts

Despite holding a 3-A draft classification because of his mother's dependency, Tebbetts applied for an Army Air Corps commission. He joined the military services in August 1942 and was assigned to recruiting duties in Waco, Texas during the Second World War. Tebbetts honed his managerial skills as a player-manager for the Waco Army Flying School's baseball team. He lost three years of his baseball career to his military service.

After his discharge from the military, Tebbetts returned to play for the Tigers in 1946, posting a .243 batting average in 86 games. He was hitting for only a .094 average in May 1947 when he was traded to the Boston Red Sox for catcher Hal Wagner. After the trade, Tebbetts hit for a .299 average for the remainder of the season. There were reports in July 1947 that the Red Sox were considering Tebbetts as a successor to their manager, Joe Cronin. He was hitting for a .286 average at mid-season in 1948 and was named as a reserve catcher for the American League in the 1948 All-Star Game. The Red Sox finished the season in a first place tie with the Cleveland Indians before losing the pennant in a one-game playoff at Fenway Park.

Tebbetts was elected to be the starting catcher for the American League in the 1949 All-Star Game. He hit for a .270 average in 1949 as the Red Sox engaged the New York Yankees in a tight battle for the pennant that was not decided until the final game of the season. The Red Sox had a one-game lead with two games left to play in the season, but lost the final two games of the season against their New York rivals to once again finish in second place.

In 1950, the 37-year-old Tebbetts shared catching duties with Matt Batts as he posted a career-high .310 batting average in 84 games. The Red Sox were once again involved in a tight pennant race before faltering to finish in third place in the standings. At a public speaking engagement in October, Tebbetts defended Red Sox manager Steve O'Neill from criticism he received from some of the Red Sox players. In his speech, Tebbetts called the critics "a couple of juvenile delinquents and moronic malcontents." His comments created friction within the team and two months later, his contract was sold to the Cleveland Indians. He spent the final two seasons of his career as a backup catcher for perennial All-Star Jim Hegan. Tebbetts played his final major league game on September 14, 1952 at the age of 38 although in a news report in December 1952, Tebbetts admitted that his actual age was 43, saying that he subtracted five years off his age after he left college.

== Career statistics ==
In a fourteen-year major league career, Tebbetts played in 1,162 games, accumulating 1,000 hits in 3,704 at bats for a .270 career batting average along with 38 home runs, 469 runs batted in and an on-base percentage of .341. He ended his career with a .978 fielding percentage. A four-time All-Star, Tebbetts led American League catchers four times in range factor, three times in assists, twice in baserunners caught stealing, and once in putouts. Before the arrival of Hall of Fame catcher, Carlton Fisk, Tebbetts was voted the Red Sox' all-time best catcher in a 1969 fan poll , a remarkable feat, considering that he spent only four years with the Red Sox.

== Managerial and executive career ==
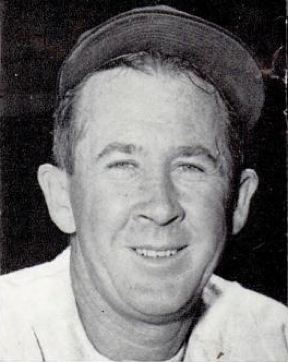
Tebbetts during his time as Cincinnati Reds manager.

In December 1952, the Indians General Manager, Hank Greenberg, named Tebbetts as the manager of the Indianapolis Indians. After Tebbetts guided Indianapolis to a fourth-place finish in 1953, he was hired by Gabe Paul to replace Rogers Hornsby as the manager of the Cincinnati Reds. After leading the Reds to fifth-place finishes in 1954 and 1955, Tebbetts led the team to a surprising third-place finish in 1956. The Reds were in first place at mid-season and stayed in the pennant race until the last day of the season, ending up with a 91–63 record, two games behind the Brooklyn Dodgers. For his efforts, the Baseball Writers' Association of America voted Tebbetts as the 1956 Manager of the Year. The Reds rewarded him with a three-year contract in December.

In 1957, Tebbetts had the Reds in first place at mid-season, earning him a place on the cover of Time magazine in July of that year. The Reds faltered during the second half of the season and faded to finish in fourth place. Frank Robinson gave Tebbetts credit for his performance during the 1957 season saying, "He kept after me all year and that's what a young ball player needs." In 1958, the Reds fell into last place and Tebbetts announced his resignation on August 14.

In October 1958, Tebbetts was hired as an executive vice president for the Milwaukee Braves. He served in the Braves front office from 1959 through September 1961, but found that he missed the excitement of being on the playing field. When the team fired Chuck Dressen in September 1961, Tebbetts returned to managing for the last month of the season. Ironically, his former team, the Cincinnati Reds, would win the National League pennant that year. Despite having talented players like Hank Aaron, Eddie Mathews, Joe Adcock, Warren Spahn, and Lew Burdette, Tebbetts could manage only a fifth-place finish in 1962.

In October 1962, Tebbetts signed a three-year contract to manage the Cleveland Indians, saying that he felt he owed a long-standing debt to new Indians General Manager, Gabe Paul. After managing the Indians to a fifth-place finish in 1963, he suffered a heart attack during spring training in Tucson, Arizona on April 1, 1964. Just three months later, he returned to manage the team. After a fifth-place finish in 1965, Tebbetts led the Indians to fourteen victories in their first fifteen games of the 1966 season, but the team faltered and fell fifteen games out of first place before he resigned as manager in August. Tommy John remembered Tebbetts's advice for pitchers when they faced hitters they really struggled against: tell the hitter exactly what they were going to throw. This was meant to confuse the hitter, who would be unsure whether to believe the pitcher or not.

In eleven seasons as a major league manager, Tebbetts compiled a 748–705 win–loss record. He returned to the minor leagues as a manager in 1967, managing the Marion Mets in the Appalachian League. From 1968 to 1997, Tebbetts scouted for the New York Mets, New York Yankees, Baltimore Orioles and the Florida Marlins. His baseball acuity earned him a reputation as one of the most respected scouts in professional baseball. Reggie Jackson credited Tebbetts' scouting reports for helping him hit three home runs in Game 6 of the 1977 World Series. He retired in 1997, having spent 60 years in baseball, including 53 years in the majors.

=== Managerial Record ===
Team	Year	Regular season				
Team	Year	Games	Won	Lost	Win %	Finish
CIN	1954	154	74	80	.481	5th in NL
CIN	1955	154	75	79	.487	5th in NL
CIN	1956	154	91	63	.591	3rd in NL
CIN	1957	154	80	74	.519	4th in NL
CIN	1958	113	52	61	.460	Resigned
CIN total		729	372	357	.510	
MIL	1961	25	12	13	.480	Interim
MIL	1962	162	86	76	.531	5th in NL
MIL total		188	98	89	.524	
CLE	1963	162	79	83	.488	6th in AL
CLE	1964	90	46	44	.511	6th in AL
CLE	1965	162	87	75	.537	5th in AL
CLE	1966	123	66	57	.537	Resigned
CLE total		537	278	259	.518	
Total		1453	748	705	.515	

== Later life, death, and legacy ==
Tebbetts moved to Anna Maria, Florida in the early 1960s. He was appointed to the Veterans Committee of the Baseball Hall of Fame in February 1979. He received the Judge Emil Fuchs Award in 1986 for his long and meritorious service in baseball.

Tebbetts died on March 24, 1999, in Bradenton, Florida, at the age of 86.

On May 28, 2009, Tebbetts was announced as a Local Legend of Nashua, New Hampshire, and commemorated with a plaque to be placed in Holman Stadium. He was inducted into the New Hampshire Interscholastic Athletic Association Hall of Fame in 2014.
