= Don Loun =

American baseball player (born 1940)

- Pitcher
- Born: November 9, 1940 (age 84); Frederick, Maryland
- Batted: Right Threw: Left

MLB debut
- September 23, 1964, for the Washington Senators

Last MLB appearance
- October 3, 1964, for the Washington Senators

MLB statistics
- Win–loss record: 1–1
- Earned run average: 2.08
- Innings: 13
- Stats at Baseball Reference

Teams
- Washington Senators (1964)

Donald Nelson Loun (born November 9, 1940) is a former Major League Baseball pitcher. He was signed by the Washington Senators before the 1961 season, and appeared in two games for them in 1964.

In Loun's major league debut (September 23, 1964), he pitched a 1-0 complete game shutout against the visiting Boston Red Sox, allowing just five hits and no walks.

His next start was also against the Red Sox, this time at Fenway Park, on October 3. This time he allowed eight hits, three walks, and four runs (three earned) in just four innings pitched. He was replaced by a pinch hitter in the top of the 5th, so he left the game trailing 4-0. The final score was 7-0.

He had a 1-1 career Major League record with an earned run average of 2.08. His minor league career in the Washington farm system continued into the 1969 season before his retirement.
