= 1964 Major League Baseball season =

1964 MLB season
- League: American League (AL); National League (NL)
- Sport: Baseball
- Duration: Regular season: April 13 – October 4, 1964; World Series: October 7–15, 1964
- Games: 162
- Teams: 20 (10 per league)
- TV partner(s): NBC, CBS

Regular season
- Season MVP: AL: Brooks Robinson (BAL); NL: Ken Boyer (STL)
- AL champions: New York Yankees
- AL runners-up: Chicago White Sox
- NL champions: St. Louis Cardinals
- NL runners-up: Philadelphia Phillies and Cincinnati Reds

World Series
- Champions: St. Louis Cardinals
- Runners-up: New York Yankees
- World Series MVP: Bob Gibson (STL)

MLB seasons
- ← 1963 1965 →

Locations of teams for the 1962–1964 American League seasons
American League
Locations of teams for the 1964 National League season
National League

The 1964 major league baseball season began on April 13, 1964. The regular season ended on October 4, with the St. Louis Cardinals and New York Yankees as the regular season champions of the National League and American League, respectively. The postseason began with Game 1 of the 61st World Series on October 7 and ended with Game 7 on October 15. In the fifth iteration of this World Series matchup, the Cardinals defeated the Yankees, four games to three, capturing their seventh championship in franchise history, since their previous in 1946. As of 2024, the Cardinals are the only National League team to have an edge over the Yankees in series played (3–2), despite holding a losing record in World Series games against them (13–15). Going into the season, the defending World Series champions were the Los Angeles Dodgers from the 1963 season.

The 35th All-Star Game was held on July 7 at Shea Stadium in New York, New York, home of the New York Mets. The National League won, 7–4.

This season is often remembered for the end of the New York Yankees' third dynasty, as they won their 29th American League Championship in 44 seasons.

== Schedule ==
The 1964 schedule consisted of 162 games for all teams in the American League and National League, each of which had 10 teams. Each team was scheduled to play 18 games against the other nine teams of their respective league. This continued the format put in place by the American League since the 1961 season and by the National League since the 1962 season, and would be used until 1969.

Opening Day took place on April 13, featuring four teams. The final day of the regular season was on October 4, which saw 18 teams play. The World Series took place between October 7 and October 15.

== Rule changes ==
The 1964 season saw the following rule changes:

- In an attempt to help bolster the four expansion teams, (Houston Colt .45s, Los Angeles Angels, New York Mets, and Washington Senators), they were permitted to farm out four first-year players in addition to what all other sixteen teams could do. These four additional players did not count in each team's player roster, nor would the teams risk losing said players on waivers. The rules for the other sixteen teams limited the number of players to one.
- Colored bats, unless approved by the Rules Committee, were banned.

== Teams ==
League	Team	City	Ballpark	Capacity	Manager
American League	Baltimore Orioles	Baltimore, Maryland	Baltimore Memorial Stadium	51,991	Hank Bauer
American League	Boston Red Sox	Boston, Massachusetts	Fenway Park	33,357	Johnny Pesky
American League	Boston Red Sox	Boston, Massachusetts	Fenway Park	33,357	Billy Herman
American League	Chicago White Sox	Chicago, Illinois	White Sox Park	46,550	Al López
American League	Cleveland Indians	Cleveland, Ohio	Cleveland Stadium	73,811	George Strickland
American League	Cleveland Indians	Cleveland, Ohio	Cleveland Stadium	73,811	Birdie Tebbetts
American League	Detroit Tigers	Detroit, Michigan	Tiger Stadium	53,089	Chuck Dressen
American League	Kansas City Athletics	Kansas City, Missouri	Municipal Stadium	34,165	Ed Lopat
American League	Kansas City Athletics	Kansas City, Missouri	Municipal Stadium	34,165	Mel McGaha
American League	Los Angeles Angels	Los Angeles, California	Dodger Stadium (Note: Dodger Stadium was referred to as "Chavez Ravine Stadium" by the Angels during their tenure.)	56,000	Bill Rigney
American League	Minnesota Twins	Bloomington, Minnesota	Metropolitan Stadium	40,073	Sam Mele
American League	New York Yankees	New York, New York	Yankee Stadium	67,337	Yogi Berra
American League	Washington Senators	Washington, D.C.	District of Columbia Stadium	43,500	Gil Hodges
National League	Chicago Cubs	Chicago, Illinois	Wrigley Field	36,755	Bob Kennedy
National League	Cincinnati Reds	Cincinnati, Ohio	Crosley Field	29,603	Fred Hutchinson
National League	Cincinnati Reds	Cincinnati, Ohio	Crosley Field	29,603	Dick Sisler
National League	Houston Colt .45s	Houston, Texas	Colt Stadium	33,010	Harry Craft
National League	Houston Colt .45s	Houston, Texas	Colt Stadium	33,010	Lum Harris
National League	Los Angeles Dodgers	Los Angeles, California	Dodger Stadium	56,000	Walter Alston
National League	Milwaukee Braves	Milwaukee, Wisconsin	Milwaukee County Stadium	43,768	Bobby Bragan
National League	New York Mets	New York, New York	Shea Stadium	55,300	Casey Stengel
National League	Philadelphia Phillies	Philadelphia, Pennsylvania	Connie Mack Stadium	33,608	Gene Mauch
National League	Pittsburgh Pirates	Pittsburgh, Pennsylvania	Forbes Field	35,500	Danny Murtaugh
National League	San Francisco Giants	San Francisco, California	Candlestick Park	42,553	Alvin Dark
National League	St. Louis Cardinals	St. Louis, Missouri	Busch Stadium	30,500	Johnny Keane

== Standings ==
=== American League ===
American League
Team	W	L	Pct.	GB	Home	Road
New York Yankees	99	63	.611	—	50‍–‍31	49‍–‍32
Chicago White Sox	98	64	.605	1	52‍–‍29	46‍–‍35
Baltimore Orioles	97	65	.599	2	49‍–‍32	48‍–‍33
Detroit Tigers	85	77	.525	14	46‍–‍35	39‍–‍42
Los Angeles Angels	82	80	.506	17	45‍–‍36	37‍–‍44
Cleveland Indians	79	83	.488	20	41‍–‍40	38‍–‍43
Minnesota Twins	79	83	.488	20	40‍–‍41	39‍–‍42
Boston Red Sox	72	90	.444	27	45‍–‍36	27‍–‍54
Washington Senators	62	100	.383	37	31‍–‍50	31‍–‍50
Kansas City Athletics	57	105	.352	42	26‍–‍55	31‍–‍50

=== National League ===
National League
Team	W	L	Pct.	GB	Home	Road
St. Louis Cardinals	93	69	.574	—	48‍–‍33	45‍–‍36
Philadelphia Phillies	92	70	.568	1	46‍–‍35	46‍–‍35
Cincinnati Reds	92	70	.568	1	47‍–‍34	45‍–‍36
San Francisco Giants	90	72	.556	3	44‍–‍37	46‍–‍35
Milwaukee Braves	88	74	.543	5	45‍–‍36	43‍–‍38
Pittsburgh Pirates	80	82	.494	13	42‍–‍39	38‍–‍43
Los Angeles Dodgers	80	82	.494	13	41‍–‍40	39‍–‍42
Chicago Cubs	76	86	.469	17	40‍–‍41	36‍–‍45
Houston Colt .45s	66	96	.407	27	41‍–‍40	25‍–‍56
New York Mets	53	109	.327	40	33‍–‍48	20‍–‍61

=== Tie games ===
6 tie games (4 in AL, 2 in NL), which are not factored into winning percentage or games behind (and were often replayed again) occurred throughout the season.

==== American League ====
The Cleveland Indians and New York Yankees had two tie games each. The Baltimore Orioles, Detroit Tigers, Kansas City Athletics, and Minnesota Twins had one each.

- May 13, Detroit Tigers vs. New York Yankees, tied at 1 after a shortened six innings due to rain. 36 minute rain delay began during first at bat of the top of the seventh, which was negated.
- June 22, Minnesota Twins vs. Cleveland Indians, tied at 8 during the top of the 11th inning due to rain.
- July 4, Baltimore Orioles vs. Kansas City Athletics, tied at 6 after nine innings on account of curfew.
- July 12, Cleveland Indians vs. New York Yankees, tied at 2 after a shortened game in the middle of the seventh inning due to rain.

==== National League ====
The Los Angeles Dodgers had two tie games. The Cincinnati Reds and New York Mets had one each.

- May 28, Cincinnati Reds vs. Los Angeles Dodgers, tied at 2 after 17 innings on account of curfew.
- June 7, New York Mets vs. Los Angeles Dodgers, tied at 1 after a shortened five innings due to rain. Game called after 64 minute rain delay.

== Postseason ==
The postseason began on October 7 and ended on October 15 with the St. Louis Cardinals defeating the New York Yankees in the 1964 World Series in seven games.

=== Bracket ===
World Series
AL	New York Yankees	3
NL	St. Louis Cardinals	4

== Managerial changes ==
=== Off-season ===
Team	Former Manager	New Manager
Baltimore Orioles	Billy Hitchcock	Hank Bauer
Cleveland Indians	Birdie Tebbetts	George Strickland
New York Yankees	Ralph Houk	Yogi Berra

=== In-season ===
Team	Former Manager	New Manager
Boston Red Sox	Johnny Pesky	Billy Herman
Cincinnati Reds	Fred Hutchinson	Dick Sisler
Cleveland Indians	George Strickland	Birdie Tebbetts
Houston Colt .45s	Harry Craft	Lum Harris
Kansas City Athletics	Ed Lopat	Mel McGaha

== League leaders ==
=== American League ===
Hitting leaders
Stat	Player	Total
AVG	Tony Oliva (MIN)	.323
OPS	Mickey Mantle (NYY)	1.015
HR	Harmon Killebrew (MIN)	49
RBI	Brooks Robinson (BAL)	118
R	Tony Oliva (MIN)	109
H	Tony Oliva (MIN)	217
SB	Luis Aparicio (BAL)	57

Pitching leaders
Stat	Player	Total
W	Dean Chance (LAA); Gary Peters (CWS)	20
L	Diego Seguí (KCA)	17
ERA	Dean Chance (LAA)	1.65
K	Al Downing (NYY)	217
IP	Dean Chance (LAA)	278.1
SV	Dick Radatz (BOS)	29
WHIP	Joe Horlen (CWS)	0.935

=== National League ===
Hitting leaders
Stat	Player	Total
AVG	Roberto Clemente (PIT)	.339
OPS	Willie Mays (SF)	.990
HR	Willie Mays (SF)	47
RBI	Ken Boyer (STL)	119
R	Dick Allen (PHI)	125
H	Roberto Clemente (PIT); Curt Flood (STL)	211
SB	Maury Wills (LAD)	53

Pitching leaders
Stat	Player	Total
W	Larry Jackson (CHC)	24
L	Tracy Stallard (NYM)	20
ERA	Sandy Koufax (LAD)	1.74
K	Bob Veale (PIT)	250
IP	Don Drysdale (LAD)	321.1
SV	Hal Woodeshick (HOU)	23
WHIP	Sandy Koufax (LAD)	0.928

== Milestones ==
=== Batters ===
==== Cycles ====
- Jim King (WAS):
  - King hit for his first cycle and first in franchise history, on May 26 against the Boston Red Sox.
- Ken Boyer (STL):
  - Boyer hit for his second cycle, 13th in franchise history, and eighth natural cycle in major league history, on June 16 against the Houston Colt .45s.
- Willie Stargell (PIT):
  - Stargell hit for his first cycle and 18th in franchise history, on July 22 against the St. Louis Cardinals.
- Jim Fregosi (LAA):
  - Fregosi hit for his first cycle and first in franchise history, on July 28 against the New York Yankees.

==== Other batting accomplishments ====
- Tony Oliva / Bob Allison / Jimmie Hall / Harmon Killebrew (MIN):
  - Became the third group of players to hit four consecutive home runs in the 11th inning on May 2 against the Kansas City Athletics.
- Bert Campaneris (KCA):
  - Became the third player to hit two home runs in his Major League debut on July 23 against the Minnesota Twins, hitting a home runs in the first and seventh innings.

=== Pitchers ===
==== Perfect games ====
- Jim Bunning (PHI)
  - Pitched the seventh perfect game in major league history and the first in franchise history in game one of a doubleheader on June 21 against the New York Mets. Bunning threw 89 pitches, 68 for strikes, and struck out 10 in the 6–0 victory.

==== No-hitters ====
- Ken Johnson (HOU):
  - Johnson threw his first career no-hitter and the second no-hitter in franchise history, in a 1–0 loss to the Cincinnati Reds on April 23. He walked two and struck out nine. This was the first instance of a team throwing a no-hitter but still losing the game.
- Sandy Koufax (LAD):
  - Koufax threw his third career no-hitter and the 16th no-hitter in franchise history, by defeating the Philadelphia Phillies 3–0 on June 4. He walked one and struck out 12, throwing 68 strikes on 97 pitches.

=== Miscellaneous ===
- San Francisco Giants:
  - Set a major league record for most runs scored in the 23th inning, by scoring two runs against the New York Mets in game two of a doubleheader on September 1.

== Awards and honors ==
=== Regular season ===
Baseball Writers' Association of America Awards
BBWAA Award	National League	American League
Rookie of the Year	Dick Allen (PHI)	Tony Oliva (MIN)
Cy Young Award	—	Dean Chance (LAA)
Most Valuable Player	Ken Boyer (STL)	Brooks Robinson (BAL)
Babe Ruth Award (World Series MVP)	Bob Gibson (STL)	—
Gold Glove Awards
Position	National League	American League
Pitcher	Bobby Shantz (PHI/CHC/STL)	Jim Kaat (MIN)
Catcher	Johnny Edwards (CIN)	Elston Howard (NYY)
1st Base	Bill White (STL)	Vic Power (PHI (Note: Power was traded from the Angels to NL team Philadelphia Phillies on September 9, 1964.)/LAA/MIN)
2nd Base	Bill Mazeroski (PIT)	Bobby Richardson (NYY)
3rd Base	Ron Santo (CHC)	Brooks Robinson (BAL)
Shortstop	Rubén Amaro (PHI)	Luis Aparicio (BAL)
Outfield	Roberto Clemente (PIT)	Vic Davalillo (CLE)
Outfield	Curt Flood (STL)	Al Kaline (DET)
Outfield	Willie Mays (SF)	Jim Landis (CWS)

=== Other awards ===
- Sport Magazine's World Series Most Valuable Player Award: Bob Gibson (STL)

The Sporting News Awards
Award	National League	American League
Player of the Year	Ken Boyer (STL)	—
Pitcher of the Year	Sandy Koufax (LAD)	Dean Chance (LAA)
Fireman of the Year (Relief pitcher)	Al McBean (PIT)	Dick Radatz (BOS)
Rookie Player of the Year	Dick Allen (PHI)	Tony Oliva (MIN)
Rookie Pitcher of the Year	Billy McCool (CIN)	Wally Bunker (BAL)
Manager of the Year	Johnny Keane (STL)	—
Executive of the Year	Bing Devine (STL)	—

=== Monthly awards ===
==== Player of the Month ====
Month	National League
May	Billy Williams (CHC)
June	Jim Bunning (PHI)
July	Ron Santo (CHC)
August	Frank Robinson (CIN)
September	Bob Gibson (STL)

=== Baseball Hall of Fame ===
- Luke Appling
- Red Faber
- Burleigh Grimes
- Tim Keefe
- Heinie Manush
- John Montgomery Ward
- Miller Huggins (manager)

== Home field attendance ==
Team name	Wins	%±	Home attendance	%±	Per game
Los Angeles Dodgers	80	−19.2%	2,228,751	−12.2%	27,515
New York Mets	53	3.9%	1,732,597	60.4%	21,129
San Francisco Giants	90	2.3%	1,504,364	−4.3%	18,572
Philadelphia Phillies	92	5.7%	1,425,891	57.2%	17,604
New York Yankees	99	−4.8%	1,305,638	−0.3%	16,119
Chicago White Sox	98	4.3%	1,250,053	7.9%	15,433
Minnesota Twins	79	−13.2%	1,207,514	−14.2%	14,726
St. Louis Cardinals	93	0.0%	1,143,294	−2.3%	14,115
Baltimore Orioles	97	12.8%	1,116,215	44.1%	13,612
Milwaukee Braves	88	4.8%	910,911	17.8%	11,246
Boston Red Sox	72	−5.3%	883,276	−6.3%	10,905
Cincinnati Reds	92	7.0%	862,466	0.4%	10,518
Detroit Tigers	85	7.6%	816,139	−0.7%	9,953
Los Angeles Angels	82	17.1%	760,439	−7.4%	9,388
Pittsburgh Pirates	80	8.1%	759,496	−3.1%	9,376
Chicago Cubs	76	−7.3%	751,647	−23.3%	9,280
Houston Colt .45s	66	0.0%	725,773	0.9%	8,960
Cleveland Indians	79	0.0%	653,293	16.1%	7,967
Kansas City Athletics	57	−21.9%	642,478	−15.7%	7,932
Washington Senators	62	10.7%	600,106	12.0%	7,409

== Venues ==
The New York Mets leave the Polo Grounds (where they played for two seasons) and open Shea Stadium (with the AFL's New York Jets) where they would go on to play 45 seasons through 2008. Excluding 1958–1961, the time in which there was no National League New York team (following the relocation of the New York Giants to San Francisco, California), this marked the first season to not see any iteration of the Polo Grounds not feature a major-league team since 1882, the season prior to founding of the Giants.

The Houston Colt .45s would play their final game at Colt Stadium on September 27 against the Los Angeles Dodgers, moving into the Houston Astrodome (as the Houston Astros) for the start of the 1965 season.

== Media ==
=== Television ===
CBS and NBC aired weekend Game of the Week broadcasts. Although it had been three years since the Sports Broadcasting Act of 1961 was passed to authorize sports leagues to enter into television contracts that "pooled" the TV rights of all their teams, MLB still operated under the older system where the networks purchased the regular season rights to individual clubs. By 1964, CBS paid $895,000 total for the rights to six teams, with the New York Yankees getting a $550,000 share. The six clubs that exclusively played nationally televised games on NBC were paid $1.2 million total.

The All-Star Game and World Series aired on NBC.

== Retired numbers ==
- Fred Hutchinson had his No. 1 retired by the Cincinnati Reds on October 19. This was the first number retired by the team (aside from the temporary, two-season retired No. 5 of Willard Hershberger).

== See also ==
- 1964 in baseball (Events, Births, Deaths)
- 1964 Nippon Professional Baseball season
