= 1963 Los Angeles Angels season =

Major League Baseball season

1963 Los Angeles Angels
- League: American League
- Ballpark: Chávez Ravine Stadium
- City: Los Angeles, California
- Record: 70–91 (.435)
- League place: 9th
- Owner: Gene Autry
- General manager: Fred Haney
- Manager: Bill Rigney
- Television: KHJ
- Radio: KMPC (Buddy Blattner, Don Wells, Steve Bailey)
- Stats: ESPN.com; Baseball Reference

The 1963 Los Angeles Angels season was the 3rd season of the Angels franchise in the American League, the 3rd in Los Angeles, and their 2nd season playing their home games at Chávez Ravine Stadium. The Angels finished the season ninth in the American League with a record of 70 wins and 91 losses.

== Offseason ==
- December 11, 1962: Earl Averill, Jr. was traded by the Angels to the Philadelphia Phillies for Jacke Davis.
- Prior to 1963 season: Art Fowler was signed as a free agent by the Angels.

== Regular season ==
=== Season standings ===
American League
Team	W	L	Pct.	GB	Home	Road
New York Yankees	104	57	.646	—	58‍–‍22	46‍–‍35
Chicago White Sox	94	68	.580	10½	49‍–‍33	45‍–‍35
Minnesota Twins	91	70	.565	13	48‍–‍33	43‍–‍37
Baltimore Orioles	86	76	.531	18½	48‍–‍33	38‍–‍43
Cleveland Indians	79	83	.488	25½	41‍–‍40	38‍–‍43
Detroit Tigers	79	83	.488	25½	47‍–‍34	32‍–‍49
Boston Red Sox	76	85	.472	28	44‍–‍36	32‍–‍49
Kansas City Athletics	73	89	.451	31½	36‍–‍45	37‍–‍44
Los Angeles Angels	70	91	.435	34	39‍–‍42	31‍–‍49
Washington Senators	56	106	.346	48½	31‍–‍49	25‍–‍57

=== Record vs. opponents ===
1963 American League record Sources:
Team	BAL	BOS	CWS	CLE	DET	KCA	LAA	MIN	NYY	WAS
Baltimore	—	7–11	7–11	10–8	13–5	9–9	9–9	9–9	7–11	15–3
Boston	11–7	—	8–10	10–8	9–9	7–11	9–8	7–11	6–12	9–9
Chicago	11–7	10–8	—	11–7	11–7	12–6	10–8	8–10	8–10	13–5
Cleveland	8–10	8–10	7–11	—	10–8	11–7	10–8	5–13	7–11	13–5
Detroit	5–13	9–9	7–11	8–10	—	13–5	12–6	8–10	8–10	9–9
Kansas City	9–9	11–7	6–12	7–11	5–13	—	10–8	9–9	6–12	10–8
Los Angeles	9–9	8–9	8–10	8–10	6–12	8–10	—	9–9	5–13	9–9
Minnesota	9–9	11–7	10–8	13–5	10–8	9–9	9–9	—	6–11	14–4
New York	11–7	12–6	10–8	11–7	10–8	12–6	13–5	11–6	—	14–4
Washington	3–15	9–9	5–13	5–13	9–9	8–10	9–9	4–14	4–14	—

=== Notable transactions ===
- May 15, 1963: Bobby Darwin was selected off waivers from the Angels by the Baltimore Orioles as a first-year waiver pick.
- July 27, 1963: Jimmy Piersall was signed as a free agent by the Angels.
- September 20, 1963: Jimmy Piersall was released by the Angels.

=== Roster ===
1963 Los Angeles Angels
Roster
Pitchers: 36 Bo Belinsky; 31 Dean Chance; 45 Bob Duliba; 24 Art Fowler; 49 Paul Foytack; 33 Aubrey Gatewood; 33 Eli Grba; 48 Don Lee; 30 Mike Lee; 37 Ken McBride; 45 Ron Moeller; 47 Tom Morgan; 35 Julio Navarro; 43 Mel Nelson; 17 Fred Newman; 40 Dan Osinski; 41 Jack Spring; 39 Bob Turley	Catchers: 16 Hank Foiles; 8 Ed Kirkpatrick; 7 Buck Rodgers; 6 Ed Sadowski; Infielders: 23 Charlie Dees; 11 Jim Fregosi; 1 Joe Koppe; 14 Frank Kostro; 12 Billy Moran; 2 Tom Satriano; 32 Lee Thomas; 19 Félix Torres	Outfielders: 26 Ken Hunt; 28 Albie Pearson; 25 Bob Perry; 4 Jimmy Piersall; 15 Bob Sadowski; 4 George Thomas; 27 Leon Wagner	Manager: 18 Bill Rigney; Coaches: 21 Rocky Bridges; 5 Marv Grissom; 3 Jack Paepke; 9 Del Rice

== Player stats ==
= Indicates team leader

=== Batting ===
==== Starters by position ====
Note: Pos = Position; G = Games played; AB = At bats; H = Hits; Avg. = Batting average; HR = Home runs; RBI = Runs batted in

Pos	Player	G	AB	H	Avg.	HR	RBI
C	Buck Rodgers	100	300	70	.233	4	23
1B	Lee Thomas	149	528	116	.220	9	55
2B	Billy Moran	153	597	164	.275	7	65
3B	Félix Torres	138	463	121	.261	4	51
SS	Jim Fregosi	154	592	170	.287	9	50
LF	Leon Wagner	149	550	160	.291	7	49
CF	Albie Pearson	154	578	176	.304	6	47
RF	George Thomas	53	167	35	.210	4	15

==== Other batters ====
Note: G = Games played; AB = At bats; H = Hits; Avg. = Batting average; HR = Home runs; RBI = Runs batted in

Player	G	AB	H	Avg.	HR	RBI
Charlie Dees	60	202	62	.307	3	27
Ed Sadowski	80	174	30	.172	4	15
Bob Perry	61	166	42	.253	3	14
Bob Sadowski	88	144	36	.250	1	22
Joe Koppe	76	143	30	.210	1	12
Ken Hunt	59	142	26	.183	5	16
Frank Kostro	43	99	22	.222	2	10
Hank Foiles	41	84	18	.214	4	10
Ed Kirkpatrick	34	77	15	.195	2	7
Jimmy Piersall	20	52	16	.308	0	4
Tom Satriano	23	50	9	.180	0	2

=== Pitching ===
==== Starting pitchers ====
Note: G = Games pitched; IP = Innings pitched; W = Wins; L = Losses; ERA = Earned run average; SO = Strikeouts

Player	G	IP	W	L	ERA	SO
Ken McBride	36	251.0	13	12	3.26	147
Dean Chance	45	248.0	13	18	3.19	168
Bo Belinsky	13	76.2	2	9	5.75	60
Aubrey Gatewood	4	24.0	1	1	1.50	13

==== Other pitchers ====
Note: G = Games pitched; IP = Innings pitched; W = Wins; L = Losses; ERA = Earned run average; SO = Strikeouts

Player	G	IP	W	L	ERA	SO
Dan Osinski	47	159.1	8	8	3.28	100
Don Lee	40	154.0	8	11	3.68	89
Bob Turley	19	87.1	2	7	3.30	70
Paul Foytack	25	70.1	5	5	3.71	37
Fred Newman	12	44.0	1	5	5.32	16
Mike Lee	6	26.0	1	1	3.81	11

==== Relief pitchers ====
Note: G = Games pitched; W = Wins; L = Losses; SV = Saves; ERA = Earned run average; SO = Strikeouts

Player	G	W	L	SV	ERA	SO
Julio Navarro	57	4	5	12	2.89	53
Art Fowler	57	5	3	10	2.42	53
Jack Spring	45	3	0	2	3.05	13
Mel Nelson	36	2	3	1	5.30	41
Tom Morgan	13	0	0	1	5.51	7
Eli Grba	12	1	2	0	4.67	5
Bob Duliba	6	1	1	1	1.17	4
Ron Moeller	3	0	0	0	6.75	2

== Awards and honors ==
All-Star Game

- Ken McBride, Pitcher, Starter
- Albie Pearson, Outfield, Starter
- Leon Wagner, Outfield, Starter

== Farm system ==
Level	Team	League	Manager
AAA	Hawaii Islanders	Pacific Coast League	Irv Noren
AA	Nashville Vols	Sally League	John Fitzpatrick
A	San Jose Bees	California League	Red Marion
A	Quad Cities Angels	Midwest League	Chuck Tanner
A	Tri-City Angels	Northwest League	Tommy Heath

Records
Preceded by 1962	Los Angeles Angels seasons 1963	Succeeded by 1964
