= Albie Pearson =

American baseball player (1934–2023)

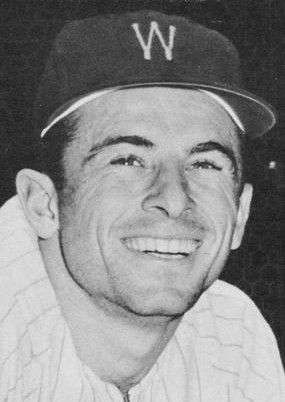
- Pearson in 1959
- Outfielder
- Born: September 12, 1934; Alhambra, California, U.S.
- Died: February 21, 2023 (aged 88); Bentonville, Arkansas, U.S.
- Batted: Left Threw: Left

MLB debut
- April 14, 1958, for the Washington Senators

Last MLB appearance
- July 16, 1966, for the California Angels

MLB statistics
- Batting average: .270
- Home runs: 28
- Runs batted in: 214
- Stats at Baseball Reference

Teams
- Washington Senators (1958–1959); Baltimore Orioles (1959–1960); Los Angeles / California Angels (1961–1966)

Career highlights and awards
- All-Star (1963); AL Rookie of the Year (1958)

Albert Gregory Pearson (September 12, 1934 – February 21, 2023) was an American professional baseball player. He played in Major League Baseball (MLB) as a centerfielder for the Washington Senators (1958–59), Baltimore Orioles (1959–60), and Los Angeles/California Angels (1961–66). Pearson stood 5 feet 5 inches (1.65 m) tall, weighed 140 pounds (64 kg), and batted and threw left-handed.

Named for star college football player Albie Booth, Pearson grew up desiring to play baseball. Though he initially attended Mt. San Antonio College, he dropped out to sign with the Boston Red Sox after a psychology professor suggested he was more interested in baseball than his lectures. Pearson spent five years playing Minor League Baseball in Boston's organization but had not yet reached the major leagues upon his trade to the Senators in 1958. Pearson made Washington's roster out of spring training that season and batted .275, winning the American League (AL) Rookie of the Year and the Sporting News Rookie of the Year Awards. He struggled to start off the 1959 season, though, and was traded to Baltimore during the year; Pearson went back and forth between the minor leagues and the majors in 1959 and 1960. Hearing that his native California was about to be awarded the expansion Los Angeles Angels, Pearson wrote Fred Haney, the Angels' general manager, asking the Angels to pick him in the expansion draft. Haney did draft Pearson–as the 30th and last pick.

With the Angels, Pearson turned his career around. He batted .288 in his first year with the ballclub and became a starting outfielder again. The Angels named him their starting right fielder in 1962, but he was moved to centerfield on May 4 after Lee Thomas batted only .149 in his first 17 games. Pearson led the AL with 115 runs scored that season. In 1963, he was selected to the All-Star Game, earning the start in the game over Mickey Mantle, who had broken his leg a month earlier. Pearson was one of four AL players to hit over .300 in 1963, a season in which he set career highs in many categories. After Pearson batted .214 in the first two months of 1964, he was replaced in centerfield by Bob Perry, serving as a reserve player the rest of the year and only batting .223 on the season. He earned a platoon role with Lou Clinton in 1965 and batted .278 while playing 122 games. However, a back injury suffered in spring training of 1966 limited Pearson to two games, and he retired after that season.

After retiring, Pearson was involved in Christian ministries. He became an ordained minister in 1972, and in 1997, he and his wife sold their home to found Father's Heart Ranch in Desert Hot Springs, California, an 11-acre (4.5 ha) home for abused, neglected and abandoned 6- to 12-year-old boys. Golf was one of Pearson's hobbies, and he also acted in television shows and released a record under the Capitol label.

== Early life ==
Pearson was named after star college football player Albie Booth. He inherited his short height from his parents; his father was 5 feet 5 inches (1.65 m) and his mother was 5 feet 1 inch (1.55 m). He was their only child. He was interested in baseball from a young age. When he was six, he borrowed his mother's decorative pillows and used them for a makeshift baseball field, then pretended to hit a home run to beat the New York Yankees in the World Series. He said God told him during that game, "Join my team."

Pearson pitched and played the outfield for the baseball team, played halfback for the football team, and played on the basketball team at El Monte High School, earning 13 letters in those three sports. On the baseball team his senior year, he had a 23–6 record and an 0.83 earned run average (ERA) while batting .506, but he drew little interest from scouts because of his height. Though he was offered football scholarships at California Polytechnic State University and Pacific University, he turned them down to attend Mt. San Antonio College which was nearer his home. Following part of a semester at Mt. San Antonio, he was signed by the Boston Red Sox as an amateur free agent in 1953. He said that he dropped out of Mt. San Antonio to sign with the Red Sox after a psychology professor suggested he was more interested in baseball than his lectures (which Pearson agreed with).

== Baseball career ==
=== Minor leagues ===
Tom Downey was the scout who signed Pearson to his first contract, which amounted to little else besides two pairs of cleats, a new suitcase, and a promise of making $225 a month if he made the team. "I was afraid they wouldn't give me another chance," Pearson said of his decision to sign. "I realized this was the way it had to be." Pearson was assigned to the San Jose Red Sox of the Class C California League, where he hit .334 in 125 games. Although he was signed as a pitcher, a shortage of outfielders at San Jose forced Pearson to have a spot in the lineup daily. After getting eight hits in his first two games, Pearson did little pitching during his minor league career–none with San Jose though he spent all of 1953 with them.

Promoted to the Albany Senators in the Class A Eastern League in 1954, he hit .269. He earned a two-game promotion to play for the Louisville Colonels of the Class AAA American Association. Pearson spent 1955 back at Class A, this time hitting .305 for the Montgomery Rebels in the South Atlantic League. He split 1956 between the San Francisco Seals in the Open Pacific Coast League (PCL) and the Oklahoma City Indians in the Class AA Texas League, hitting well throughout the season and finishing with a combined .358 batting average with seven home runs, 46 runs batted in (RBIs), six triples, and 36 doubles. He had 91 walks and only 41 strikeouts in 153 games, winning the Texas League batting championship. Pearson was back with the Seals in 1957 and continued to hit, batting .297 with five home runs, 50 RBIs, 11 triples, and 22 doubles. Looking at archived Seals photos, Peter Hartlaub of the San Francisco Chronicle observed in October 2012 that Pearson stood apart from the other Seals because of "his joyous grin." His clean living also set him apart, as a contemporary Chronicle article observed: "The little man doesn't drink or smoke or swear." With the Seals in 1957, Pearson helped the team win the PCL title in its final season.

=== Major leagues ===
==== Washington Senators and Baltimore Orioles (1958–60) ====
On January 23, 1958, the Red Sox traded Pearson and Norm Zauchin to the Washington Senators for infielder Pete Runnels. He wrote Senators' owner Calvin Griffith a letter that month, asking permission to report to camp early, as he wanted to make a good impression despite his short size. Pearson won a spot as the Senators Opening Day centerfielder and played the position all year for Washington. Hitless in his first three games, his first major league hit came on April 19, a single against Mike Fornieles in a 4–3 victory over the Red Sox. On July 28, he had three hits and hit his first major league home run against eventual Hall of Famer Early Wynn in a 6–5 loss to the Chicago White Sox. On September 2, he hit an inside-the-park home run against Hal Brown, driving in three runs in a 4–3 victory over the Baltimore Orioles. Three days later, he hit a two-run home run against Bob Turley in a 6–3 victory over the New York Yankees. In 1958, he won both the Major League Baseball (MLB) Rookie of the Year and the Sporting News Rookie of the Year Awards in the American League (AL). Pearson played 146 games for the Senators that year, batting .275 with 63 runs scored, 146 hits, three home runs, and 33 RBIs.

A hernia and a lingering, physically draining cold caused Pearson to miss games in 1959 spring training, but he was healthy enough to play by Opening Day. However, Pearson started the 1959 season hitting only .188 over the first 25 games with no home runs and only two RBIs, after which he was traded to the Baltimore Orioles for centerfielder Lenny Green. With the Orioles in 1959, Pearson was used as a reserve outfielder in all three outfield positions. In 80 games for the Orioles, he batted .232 with 22 runs scored, 32 hits, no home runs, and six RBIs. His combined batting average in 105 games between Baltimore and Washington was .216.

Pearson started the 1960 season again as a reserve outfielder for the Orioles, batting .286 in his first 12 games. By June 12, with his average dropping to .231, Pearson was sent to the Miami Marlins, Baltimore's Class AAA team in the International League. After hitting over .300 in Miami, Pearson returned to Baltimore in September. He ended the year playing in only 48 games for the Orioles, batting .244 with 17 runs scored, 24 hits, one home run, and six RBIs.

==== Los Angeles Angels (1961–66) ====
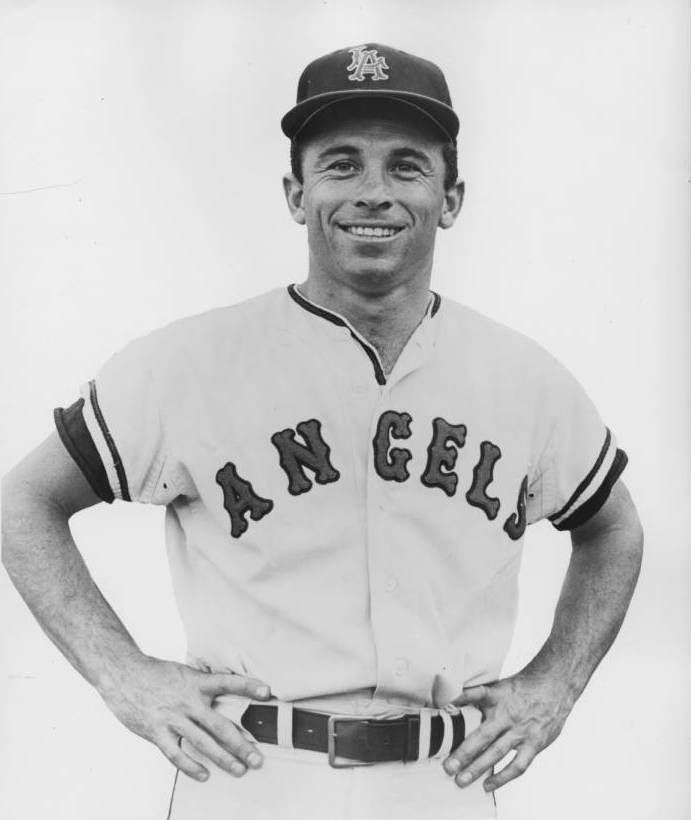
Pearson, circa 1961

Following the 1960 season, the Orioles sent Pearson back to their Class AAA affiliate, the Rochester Red Wings, in 1961. Meanwhile, baseball owners approved the creation of the Los Angeles Angels as an expansion team in October 1960, meaning there would be an expansion draft in which the Angels got to select players from all of the major league teams. Since he was from California, Pearson wrote Fred Haney, the Angels' general manager, asking the Angels to pick him in the 1960 expansion draft. Haney chose Pearson with their 30th and final pick. With the expansion Angels, Pearson turned around his career. In the team's first game, Pearson scored the franchise's first run, in a 7–0 win against his old team, the Orioles. Used mostly as a centerfielder early on, Pearson batted .250 in 30 games through May 21. For the next 30 days, he was used mainly as a pinch-hitter, batting .319 over that period. From June 19 through the end of the year, he made most of the team's starts in right field, batting .296 for the rest of the season. Pearson hit .288 with 7 home runs, 41 RBIs, and 92 runs for the season.

Pearson began the 1962 season as the Angel right fielder, but he was moved to centerfield on May 4 after Lee Thomas batted only .149 in his first 17 games. In the first game of a doubleheader against Boston on May 30, 1962, Pearson had three hits and scored four runs in a 10–5 victory. The Angels played another doubleheader two days later, but Pearson became the first player to go hitless when receiving at least 11 at bats in a doubleheader. He walked three times and had three RBIs on June 28 in a 19–7 victory over the Red Sox. With the Angels trailing the Yankees 7–6 in the bottom of the ninth inning on July 14, Pearson led off the inning with a game-tying home run against Marshall Bridges; however, the Yankees won the game in the tenth. Eleven times during the year, Pearson had three hits in a game. Pearson set a career-high with 160 games played, and he led the AL with 115 runs scored. He batted .261 with 160 hits, five home runs, 42 RBIs, and 15 stolen bases in 21 attempts.

On April 24, 1963, he had five walks, playing all 15 innings of a 4–3 loss to the Detroit Tigers. He had four RBIs on May 6, including a game-ending, two-RBI double against Bill Pleis in the ninth inning that turned a 3–2 deficit into a 4–3 win over the Minnesota Twins. In the first game of a doubleheader on May 19, his third-inning, three-run home run against eventual Hall of Famer Whitey Ford put the Angels ahead to stay in a 6–2 victory over the Yankees. Pearson had four hits and two RBIs on June 5 in an 8–2 victory over the White Sox. He was selected to the All-Star Game in 1963. At the game, he had Mickey Mantle and Brooks Robinson autograph a bat for him. Pearson was chosen to start the game in centerfield over Mantle, who had gotten off to a slow start to his season. On September 1, Pearson again had four hits in a 7–6 loss to the Kansas City Athletics. During his All-Star season, Pearson set career highs in RBIs (47), hits (173), and stolen bases (17, though the 10 times he was caught stealing led the AL). Pearson also led the AL with 139 singles, and his .304 batting average (another career-high) ranked him fourth in the batting crown race behind Carl Yastrzemski (.321), Al Kaline (.312) and Rich Rollins (.307), the only other American Leaguers to bat over .300.

Pearson only batted .214 in the 1964 season's first couple of months, and in June, he lost the starting centerfield job to Bob Perry. For the rest of the season, he was used as a pinch-hitter and pinch-runner, making occasional starts in left field and centerfield. On May 11, he had three hits, including a two-run home run against Moe Drabowsky in a 6–5 win over the Athletics. He also had three hits on May 22 in a 4–3 loss to the Yankees. In 107 games, Pearson had only 265 at-bats, batting .223 with 59 hits and two home runs. His runs scored total dropped from 92 the previous season to 34.

In 1965, Pearson began the season as a pinch-hitter. After Lou Clinton, the right fielder, only batted .200 in April, Angels manager Bill Rigney began using Pearson in a platoon role with him. Pearson, who was left-handed, typically started against right-handed pitchers, while Clinton, who was right-handed, typically started against left-handed pitchers. On June 12, Pearson had three hits, three RBIs, and two stolen bases in a 13–2 victory over the Yankees. In the first game of a doubleheader against the Twins on August 20, Pearson had four hits in a 3–1 victory. Eight days later, in the seventh inning of a game against the Tigers that was tied 3–3, Pearson delivered a go-ahead RBI single against Orlando Peña, providing the margin of victory in a 4–3 win. On August 31, his first-inning home run against Bill Stafford provided all the scoring in a 1–0 win over the Yankees. In 122 games for the Angels in 1965, Pearson had 360 at-bats and batted .278 with 41 runs scored, 100 hits, four home runs, and 21 RBIs. He only stole 12 bases but also only got caught stealing once all season.

A jarring slide into third base during 1966 spring training resulted in two ruptured discs in Pearson's back. The injury kept him from playing until July, and he only made two pinch-hit appearances before sitting out the rest of the season. He retired after the year, due partly to his back problems and partly to his belief that God wanted him to retire. In his final major league appearance on July 16, Pearson pinch-hit for Angel starting pitcher Dean Chance in the fifth inning, then finished a 7–1 loss to Boston in left field.

In his nine-year major league career, Pearson was a .270 hitter with 28 home runs and 214 RBIs in 988 games. He compiled a 2.45 walk-to-strikeout ratio (477-to-195) and a .369 on-base percentage.

== Stature ==
During his career, Pearson was the shortest player in the major leagues. He stood 5 feet 5 inches (1.65 m) tall and weighed 140 pounds (64 kg). His small size helped make him a favorite of children, as he was closer to their height. Gilbert Rogin of Sports Illustrated wrote that in 1956, the Little Guys and Dolls of America, who did not allow anybody to join who was more than 5 feet 6 inches (1.68 m), voted Pearson their Athlete of the Year. Worried his small size would deter scouts, Pearson credits the 5-foot-6-inch (1.68 m) Bobby Shantz's successful 1952 season (in which he won 24 games) with helping Boston become interested in him. He took his short size in good humor, saying, "I never have the satisfaction of looking an umpire in the eye, I'm forever signing autographs for kids taller than I am, and human skyscrapers like Norm Zauchin and Jim Lemon of our club make me feel like a midget when they walk by but, hand me a bat and let me step into the box, and I'm as good as the next guy - some of 'em, at least."

== Personal life and later years ==
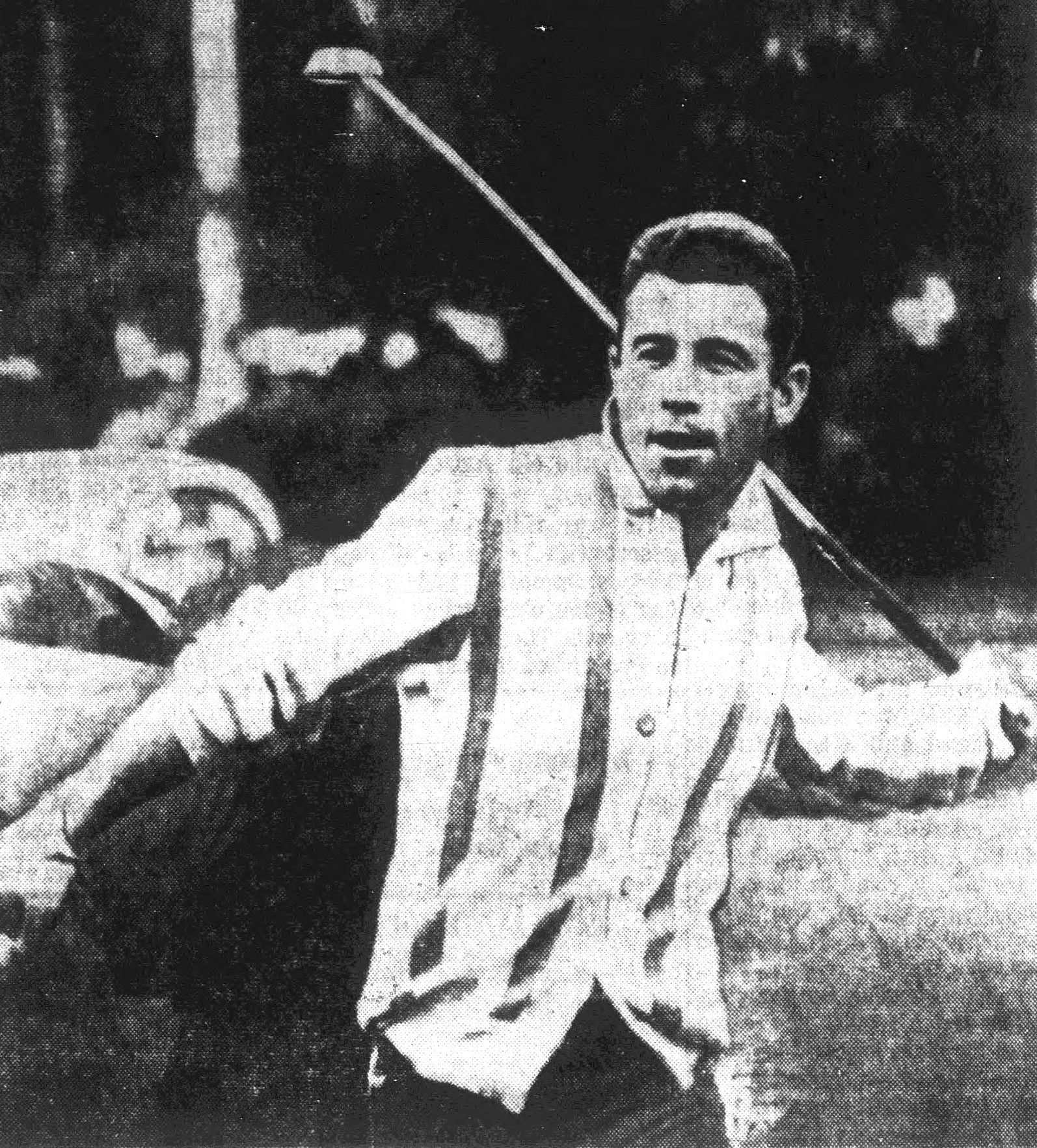
Pearson participating in a celebrity golf tournament in 1963.

Pearson and his wife Helen married in 1954. A 2011 Orange County Register article reported that they had five daughters, 17 grandchildren, and 16 great-grandchildren. Pearson also played golf; he participated in a 1962 golf tournament with several other major leaguers, including Hall of Famers Bob Lemon and Ralph Kiner. While he was with the Angels, his roommates at various times included Bo Belinsky and Don Lee. Pearson was also an actor and singer. He was offered a part in The Petticoat Pirates, a movie, but he turned it down because the proposed scene involved him drinking. However, he did appear in Day in Court, a TV show, and he would have appeared in an episode of The Roaring 20's, only his scene was cut before the episode was released. In 1961, he made two records for Capitol (only one of which was released), and he sang "Because" when his bride-to-be came down the aisle at his wedding. In the 1961–62 offseason, he served as a disc jockey on KPRO in Riverside County, California. During his career, he owned 27.5% of the stock in the Mighty Mite Corporation, which made adhesive grips for sporting equipment.

Pearson became an ordained minister in 1972. Even before that, he had taught Sunday school at Baptist churches. "I'm a firm believer in the Bible and the Ten Commandments," he told Gilbert Rogin of Sports Illustrated. He and his wife had moved to Riverside in 1960. Later that decade, he started a Riverside youth foundation which focused on helping children stay off drugs. He has founded a non-profit organization providing training for pastors and ministers and set up churches and orphanages in Ecuador and Zambia. "When you see a life changed, it's worth everything compared to getting a base hit or winning a game," he says. The Pearsons moved to Garden Valley, Texas, in 1987 so Albie could minister to musicians in the area. From 1988 through 1989, he served as the pastor of Community Christian Fellowship in Lindale, Texas, before moving back to California. In 2004, Albie and his wife became the pastors of Thousand Palms Community Church, which they later renamed Desert Christian Community Church, in Thousand Palms, California.

In 1997, Pearson and his wife sold their home to found Father's Heart Ranch in Desert Hot Springs, California, an 11-acre (4.5 ha) home for abused, neglected and abandoned 6- to 12-year-old boys. The ranch includes a Pop Warner football team and a Little League baseball team. "It's interesting and amazing how they respond to love," Pearson said of the boys at Father's Heart Ranch. "We found that to be a key. When they find out that they are not just something to kick and hit, but that they have a purpose, a God who really loves them, they begin to respond in a dramatic way. They are little miracles." In 2011, the Orange County Register noted that the Pearsons' Father's Heart International foundation was providing food to about 4,000 Zambian children each week whose parents had died of AIDS.

Pearson died in Bentonville, Arkansas, on February 21, 2023, at age 88.

== See also ==
- List of Major League Baseball annual runs scored leaders
