= 1962 Major League Baseball All-Star Game (second game) =

1962 American baseball competition

	1	2	3	4	5	6	7	8	9	R	H	E
American League	0	0	1	2	0	1	3	0	2	9	10	0
National League	0	1	0	0	0	0	1	1	1	4	10	4
- Date: July 30, 1962
- Venue: Wrigley Field
- City: Chicago, Illinois
- Managers: Ralph Houk (NYY); Fred Hutchinson (CIN)
- MVP: Leon Wagner (LAA)
- Attendance: 38,359
- Television: NBC
- TV announcers: Vin Scully and Curt Gowdy
- Radio: NBC
- Radio announcers: Jack Quinlan and George Kell

The second 1962 Major League Baseball All-Star Game was the 33rd playing of Major League Baseball's annual midsummer exhibition game. The game took place at Wrigley Field in Chicago, Illinois, home of the National League's Chicago Cubs. The American League emerged triumphant as they finally broke out of a five-game slump with nine runs. The nine runs equaled their total for the previous five games. The AL also racked up ten hits. Their victory kept the National League from tying the All-Star series at 16–16. The AL also had home runs by Pete Runnels, Leon Wagner and Rocky Colavito. A highlight of the game was the first presentation of the Arch Ward Trophy to the MVPs of each All-Star Game. It was first presented in 1962 as a tribute to Arch Ward, the man who founded the All-Star Game in 1933. That first presentation went to Leon Wagner of the Los Angeles Angels (second game MVP) and to Maury Wills of the Los Angeles Dodgers (first game MVP), because two Midsummer Classics were played.

== Roster ==
Ralph Houk's coaching staff included Hank Bauer and Bill Rigney, while Fred Hutchinson's staff included Harry Craft and Birdie Tebbetts.

Players in italics have since been inducted into the National Baseball Hall of Fame.

=== American League ===
Starters
Position	Player	Team	All-Star Games
P	Dave Stenhouse	Senators	2
C	Earl Battey	Twins	2
1B	Jim Gentile	Orioles	6
2B	Billy Moran	Angels	2
3B	Rich Rollins	Twins	2
SS	Luis Aparicio	White Sox	8
OF	Mickey Mantle (Note: Mickey Mantle was selected to the starting lineup, but did not play. Rocky Colavito took his spot in the starting lineup.)	Yankees	15
OF	Roger Maris	Yankees	7
OF	Leon Wagner	Angels	2

Pitchers
Position	Player	Team	All-Star Games
P	Hank Aguirre	Tigers	2
P	Jim Bunning	Tigers	6
P	Dick Donovan	Indians	5
P	Ray Herbert (Note: Replacement for injured player)	White Sox	1
P	Jim Kaat	Twins	1
P	Ken McBride (Note: Replaced due to injury)	Angels	2
P	Milt Pappas	Orioles	2
P	Camilo Pascual	Twins	6
P	Ralph Terry	Yankees	2
P	Hoyt Wilhelm	Orioles	7

Reserves
Position	Player	Team	All-Star Games
C	Yogi Berra	Yankees	18
C	Elston Howard	Yankees	9
C	Johnny Romano	Indians	4
1B	Pete Runnels	Red Sox	5
1B	Norm Siebern	Athletics	2
2B	Bobby Richardson	Yankees	4
3B	Brooks Robinson	Orioles	6
SS	Tom Tresh	Yankees	2
OF	Rocky Colavito	Tigers	6
OF	Al Kaline	Tigers	11
OF	Jim Landis	White Sox	2
OF	Lee Thomas	Angels	2

=== National League ===
Starters
Position	Player	Team	All-Star Games
P	Johnny Podres	Dodgers	4
C	Del Crandall	Braves	11
1B	Orlando Cepeda	Giants	8
2B	Bill Mazeroski	Pirates	7
3B	Ken Boyer	Cardinals	9
SS	Dick Groat	Pirates	6
OF	Roberto Clemente	Pirates	6
OF	Tommy Davis	Dodgers	2
OF	Willie Mays	Giants	13

Pitchers
Position	Player	Team	All-Star Games
P	Turk Farrell	Colt .45s	3
P	Bob Gibson	Cardinals	2
P	Art Mahaffey	Phillies	3
P	Juan Marichal	Giants	2
P	Bob Purkey	Reds	5
P	Warren Spahn	Braves	16

Reserves
Position	Player	Team	All-Star Games
C	John Roseboro	Dodgers	5
1B	Ernie Banks	Cubs	11
2B	Frank Bolling	Braves	4
3B	Jim Davenport	Giants	2
3B	Eddie Mathews	Braves	12
SS	Maury Wills	Dodgers	4
OF	Hank Aaron	Braves	12
OF	George Altman	Cubs	3
OF	Richie Ashburn	Mets	6
OF	Johnny Callison	Phillies	2
OF	Stan Musial	Cardinals	23
OF	Frank Robinson	Reds	7
OF	Billy Williams	Cubs	1

== Game ==
=== Starting lineups ===
American League				National League			
Order	Player	Team	Position	Order	Player	Team	Position
1	Rich Rollins	Twins	3B	1	Dick Groat	Pirates	SS
2	Billy Moran	Angels	2B	2	Roberto Clemente	Pirates	RF
3	Roger Maris	Yankees	CF	3	Willie Mays	Giants	CF
4	Rocky Colavito	Tigers	RF	4	Orlando Cepeda	Giants	1B
5	Jim Gentile	Orioles	1B	5	Tommy Davis	Dodgers	LF
6	Earl Battey	Twins	C	6	Ken Boyer	Cardinals	3B
7	Leon Wagner	Angels	LF	7	Del Crandall	Braves	C
8	Luis Aparicio	White Sox	SS	8	Bill Mazeroski	Pirates	2B
9	Dave Stenhouse	Senators	P	9	Johnny Podres	Dodgers	P

== Umpires ==
Position	Umpire
Home Plate	Jocko Conlan (NL)
First Base	Bill McKinley (AL)
Second Base	Ken Burkhart (NL)
Third Base	John Rice (AL)
Left Field	Al Forman (NL)
Right Field	Bill Kinnamon (AL)

=== Game summary ===
Monday, July 30, 1962 1:00 pm (CT) at Wrigley Field in Chicago, Illinois
Team	1	2	3	4	5	6	7	8	9	R	H	E
American League	0	0	1	2	0	1	3	0	2	9	10	0
National League	0	1	0	0	0	0	1	1	1	4	10	4
WP: Ray Herbert (1–0) LP: Art Mahaffey (0–1); Home runs: AL: Pete Runnels (1), Leon Wagner (1), Rocky Colavito (1); NL: John Roseboro (1)
