= Ken McBride =

American baseball player (born 1935)

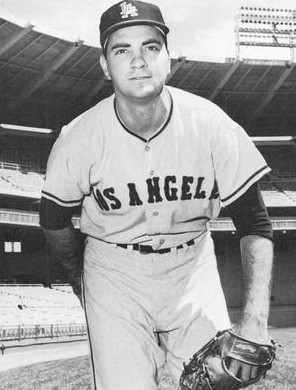
- McBride with the Los Angeles Angels in 1964
- Pitcher
- Born: August 12, 1935 (age 90); Huntsville, Alabama, U.S.
- Batted: Right Threw: Right

MLB debut
- August 4, 1959, for the Chicago White Sox

Last MLB appearance
- August 15, 1965, for the Los Angeles Angels

MLB statistics
- Win–loss record: 40–50
- Earned run average: 3.79
- Strikeouts: 503
- Stats at Baseball Reference

Teams
- Chicago White Sox (1959–1960); Los Angeles Angels (1961–1965)

Career highlights and awards
- 3× All-Star (1962, 1962², 1963)

Kenneth Faye McBride (born August 12, 1935) is an American former professional baseball player and coach. The right-handed pitcher worked in 151 games, 122 as a starter, in Major League Baseball for the Chicago White Sox (1959–1960) and Los Angeles Angels (1961–1965). A three-time American League All-Star, he was listed as 6 feet (1.8 m) tall and 195 pounds (88 kg).

== Early life ==
Kenneth McBride was born on August 12, 1935, in Huntsville, Alabama. His parents were Clifton McBride and Mona Cope, both Tennessee natives. McBride was raised in Cleveland, Ohio and attended West High School from 1949 to 1953 where he played baseball and basketball.

== Professional career ==
McBride was signed by the Boston Red Sox after he graduated from high school. In 1954, his first pro season, he won 18 of 26 decisions in the Class D Appalachian League, and was named to the loop's All-Star team. He moved up through the Red Sox organization but got no further than the Double-A level. Finally, in 1959, the White Sox purchased his contract. On August 4, 1959, McBride made his major league debut, starting against the Baltimore Orioles at Memorial Stadium. In 71/3 innings pitched, he gave up three runs (one earned) and was the losing pitcher in the 3–2 game. He gave up five hits, struck out three, and walked seven. Overall, he appeared in 16 games for Chicago during trials in both 1959 and 1960, but was winless in two decisions and then left exposed in the 1960 Major League Baseball expansion draft in mid-December. He was the Angels' seventh selection (13th overall) in the lottery.

Expansion proved to be a huge boon for McBride's career. He became a mainstay of the Angels' starting pitching staff from 1961 through 1963, reaching double figures in games won in all three years, throwing 28 complete games, and exceeding 240 innings pitched in both 1961 and 1963. During those three years, he made 95 starts, had a 36–32 record, seven shutouts, and a 3.46 earned run average. He finished in the league's top ten twice for games started, complete games, and innings pitched, and once for winning percentage, strikeouts, shutouts, and WHIP. He gave up Roger Maris' 50th home run of 1961, but still won the game, 4–3.

McBride was named to the 1961, 1962 and 1963 American League All-Star teams, and was the starting pitcher for the Junior Circuit in the 1963 midsummer classic, played in his home city of Cleveland. He went three innings and allowed three earned runs on four hits, but exited with the game tied at three. Allowed to bat in the second inning of the contest, McBride delivered an RBI single to score Angel teammate Leon Wagner and tie the game, 1–1. The National League went on to defeat McBride's squad 5–3, with future United States Senator Jim Bunning, then a pitcher for the Detroit Tigers, taking the loss in relief.

McBride began 1964 in the Angel rotation, but injured his arm in his second starting assignment. The injury proved disastrous. He appeared in 37 games for the Angels in 1964–1965, but posted a poor 4–16 record with an earned run average of 5.40, and his career came to an abrupt end.

During his seven-year MLB pitching career, McBride compiled a ledger that included 40 wins, 50 losses, 503 strikeouts, and an earned run average of 3.79. In 8072/3 innings pitched, he allowed 717 hits and 363 walks. Twice in his career he led the American League in hit batsmen (14 in 1963 and 16 in 1964). He hit 49 batters in his career, an average of almost one per every 162/3 innings pitched.

== Coaching career ==
After retiring as a player, McBride remained in the game as a minor and major league pitching coach. He began his coaching career with various minor league coaching positions in the Milwaukee Brewers system. He later served as the pitching coach on Del Crandall's Milwaukee Brewers coaching staff for part of 1974 and all of 1975. McBride retired from coaching in 1975, citing the lack of consistent pay for coaches at the time.

== Personal life ==
McBride married Catherine Weir in July 1955 while he was with the Corning Red Sox. After he retired from baseball coaching, McBride moved back to Cleveland to raise his family and start a construction company. He is a fan of the Cleveland Guardians.

Preceded by Al Widmar	Milwaukee Brewers pitching coach 1974–1975	Succeeded by Cal McLish
