= Dick Wantz =

American baseball player (1940-1965)

- Pitcher
- Born: April 11, 1940; South Gate, California, U.S.
- Died: May 13, 1965 (aged 25); Inglewood, California, U.S.
- Batted: Right Threw: Right

MLB debut
- April 13, 1965, for the Los Angeles Angels

Last MLB appearance
- April 13, 1965, for the Los Angeles Angels

MLB statistics
- Win–loss record: 0–0
- Earned run average: 18.00
- Strikeouts: 2
- Stats at Baseball Reference

Teams
- Los Angeles Angels (1965)

Richard Carter Wantz (April 11, 1940 – May 13, 1965) was an American professional baseball player whose life and Major League career were cut short when he was felled by a fatal brain tumor. A right-handed relief pitcher and a rookie member of the Los Angeles Angels in 1965, he died mere days after his April 13 MLB debut, the only appearance he would be able to make in the majors.

== Background ==
Wantz was a native of South Gate, California, and attended Artesia High School in Lakewood. After graduation from high school, Wantz attended Cerritos College and helped lead his team to the league championship in 1959 and again in 1960. He was an all-league selection both years and voted the team's most valuable player in 1960. Tall and lanky—Wantz stood 6 feet 5 inches (1.96 m) tall and weighed 175 pounds (79 kg)—he signed with the Angels in 1961 while attending California State University, Los Angeles. Then he worked his way through the minor leagues, beginning in Class D ball in 1961; by the end of the 1964 season, he was a member of the Angels' Triple-A affiliate, the Hawaii Islanders. That fall, he appeared in 11 games and won two of three decisions for the Angels' team in the Arizona Instructional League.

In 1965, Wantz pitched well during spring training and became a member of the Angels' early-season roster. He made his debut during the team's home opener in its final season as tenants at Chavez Ravine on April 13. With the opposition Cleveland Indians leading 5–0, Wantz relieved Don Lee at the start of the eighth inning. He struck out the first batter he faced, Max Alvis, but then surrendered back-to-back doubles to Vic Davalillo and Larry Brown and an RBI single to Joe Azcue. He then fanned opposing pitcher Ralph Terry and retired Dick Howser to escape further scoring. Wantz exited the game for a pinch hitter with Cleveland leading, 7–0. His pitching line: one inning pitched, in which he allowed three hits and two earned runs, with no bases on balls and two strikeouts. It would be Wantz' only appearance in the majors before his illness struck.

== Death ==
A week later, during a road trip to New York City, Wantz began to experience severe headaches. He was hospitalized in Detroit, then was diagnosed with a malignant brain tumor when he returned to California. He died in Inglewood after undergoing surgery, exactly one month after his debut against the Indians. He was 25.

== See also ==
- List of baseball players who died during their careers
