= Dave Stenhouse =

American baseball player (1933–2023)

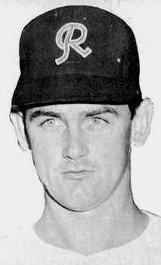
- Stenhouse in 1959
- Pitcher
- Born: September 12, 1933; Westerly, Rhode Island, U.S.
- Died: November 11, 2023 (aged 90)
- Batted: Right Threw: Right

MLB debut
- April 18, 1962, for the Washington Senators

Last MLB appearance
- October 4, 1964, for the Washington Senators

MLB statistics
- Win–loss record: 16–28
- Earned run average: 4.14
- Strikeouts: 214
- Stats at Baseball Reference

Teams
- Washington Senators (1962–1964)

Career highlights and awards
- 2× All-Star (1962, 1962²)

David Rotchford Stenhouse (September 12, 1933 – November 11, 2023) was an American Major League Baseball pitcher who played for the Washington Senators from 1962 to 1964. Born in Westerly, Rhode Island, Stenhouse batted and threw right-handed and was listed as 6 feet (1.8 m) tall and 195 pounds (88 kg).

== Early life ==
Stenhouse was born on September 12, 1933, to Clarence and Mary (Driscoll) Stenhouse in Westerly, Rhode Island.

Stenhouse attended Westerly High School, where he was captain of the school's basketball team. He was named Rhode Island Schoolboy Athlete of the Year after the 1950–51 season. Stenhouse played college baseball and basketball for the University of Rhode Island (URI). He was co-captain of the basketball team, winning All-Conference and All-New England honors; as well as excelling in baseball. He was All-Yankee Conference in both baseball and basketball.

Stenhouse received a degree in industrial engineering. Later in life, he became the president of URI's Century Club, raising funds from alumni for the school's athletics.

== Playing career ==
Stenhouse was an amateur free agent signing of the Chicago Cubs in 1955. He spent four years in the Cubs' farm system. He played for the Lafayette Oilers in 1956, having a 16–4 win–loss record and a 1.92 earned run average (ERA) in 26 games. After the 1958 season, the Cincinnati Redlegs picked him up from the Cubs' farm system in the minor league draft. He spent two years with the Seattle Rainiers and one with the Jersey City Jerseys, finishing with a 39–37 record over the course of those three seasons.

On December 15, 1961, Stenhouse and catcher Bob Schmidt were traded to the Washington Senators for pitcher Johnny Klippstein and outfielder Marty Keough. He made the team's opening day roster, and through the first half of the season had a 6–3 record and was near the American League lead in ERA. It has also been reported that Stenhouse was 10–4 going into the All-Star Game.

As a result, the rookie was selected to the 1962 All-Star Team. From 1959 to 1962, to increase revenues for the players' pension fund, MLB played two midsummer All-Star games. Stenhouse was the starting pitcher for the American League in 1962's second contest, played July 30 at Wrigley Field, Chicago. He allowed three hits, one base on balls, and one earned run in two innings pitched and left the game for pinch hitter Pete Runnels trailing, 1–0. Runnels hit a home run to tie the game, and the Junior Circuit went on to a 9–4 triumph. He was the first rookie to start a major league All-Star Game. Stenhouse only learned he was to start during the bus ride to the game, when AL manager Ralph Houk told Stenhouse he would be replacing Camilo Pascual, who was injured.

Stenhouse finished the year with an 11–12 record and a 3.65 ERA in 34 games. He followed that up with a 3–9 record and a 4.55 ERA in 16 games in 1963, and a 2–7 record and a 4.81 ERA in 1964.

Stenhouse spent the rest of his professional career in the minor leagues, spending 1965 with the York White Roses and 1965 to 1967 with the Hawaii Islanders before retiring. In 76 major-league games, with 56 starts, he posted a career 16–28 won–lost record and a 4.14 ERA, with 12 complete games, three shutouts and one save. In 372 career innings pitched, he allowed 339 hits and 174 bases on balls, with 214 strikeouts.

== Honors ==
In 1961, he was named Rhode Island Athlete of the Year. In 1972, he was inducted into the University of Rhode Island's Hall of Fame. In 1993, Stenhouse was inducted into Rhode Island College's Hall of Fame as an individual, and in 2008, he was inducted as part of the team that went to the 1979 College World Series. In 2008, Stenhouse was inducted into the Rhode Island Heritage Hall of Fame. In 2012, he was selected as a Rhode Island Basketball Legend. In 2023, on the 100th anniversary of its participation in intercollegiate athletics, RIC gave Stenhouse a Centennial Award of Distinction.

== Coaching ==
After his professional playing career ended, in 1968, Stenhouse was hired as baseball coach at Rhode Island College (RIC), where he coached for 12 years, winning over 200 games. In 1979, he led the team to the College World Series, a Rhode Island first. In 1980, he was hired to coach the Brown University baseball team, winning 170 games from 1981 to 1990. In 1983, he was named Rhode Island Coach of the Year. Stenhouse became president of the New England College Baseball Coaches Association.

== Personal life ==
His son, outfielder Mike Stenhouse, went on to play Major League Baseball for five years as well, after being an All-American baseball player at Harvard University.

Stenhouse co-founded the Cranston League for Cranston's Future (CLCF) basketball program in Cranston, Rhode Island, which he also directed. He also co-founded the Rhode Island Baseball Institute in Warwick, Rhode Island. In 1993, he founded the Jimmy Fund Council Golf Tournament, which raised over $400,000 for the Dana Farber Institute. In 2002, he received the "Jimmy Award".

== Death ==
Stenhouse died on November 11, 2023, at the age of 90.
