= Harry Schwarts =

American baseball umpire (1918-1963)

- Born: Harry Schwerdtjeyer; August 10, 1918; Cambridge, Ohio, U.S.
- Died: February 22, 1963 (aged 44); Cleveland, Ohio, U.S.
- Resting place: Sunset Memorial Park, North Olmsted, Ohio
- Occupation: Umpire
- Years active: 1960-1962
- Employer: American League

Harry Clark Schwarts (born Harry Schwerdtjeyer, August 10, 1918 – February 22, 1963) was an American professional baseball umpire who worked in the American League from 1960 to 1962. Schwarts umpired 338 major league games in his three-year career. He also umpired in the 1962 Major League Baseball All-Star Game That 1962 season, Schwarts was home plate umpire for two no-hitters: Bo Belinsky's on May 5 and Earl Wilson's on June 26. He is one of a handful of umpires to call balls and strikes for two no-hitters in one season.

Schwarts died on February 22, 1963, before the 1963 season began. His death allowed the American League to call up 28-year old Bill Haller, who would go on to work four World Series in 20 seasons.
