= Jacke Davis =

American baseball player (1936–2021)

- Outfielder
- Born: March 5, 1936; Carthage, Texas, U.S.
- Died: May 30, 2021 (aged 85); Tyler, Texas, U.S.
- Batted: Right Threw: Right

MLB debut
- April 19, 1962, for the Philadelphia Phillies

Last MLB appearance
- July 19, 1962, for the Philadelphia Phillies

MLB statistics
- Batting average: .213
- Home runs: 1
- Runs batted in: 6
- Stats at Baseball Reference

Teams
- Philadelphia Phillies (1962)

Jacke Sylvesta Davis (March 5, 1936 – May 30, 2021), often misspelled "Jack" Davis, was an American former professional baseball outfielder, who spent eight seasons in professional baseball, including part of one season in Major League Baseball (MLB) with the Philadelphia Phillies.

After Davis’ playing career was over, he returned to his hometown, becoming the coach at Carthage High School and later Panola College. Over Davis’ brief big league career, he batted .213, with nine runs, 16 hits, one triples, one home run, six runs batted in (RBI), and one stolen base, in 48 games played. Davis played 26 games in the outfield, and spent the rest of his playing time pinch hitting.

For the majority of his career, Davis played in Minor League Baseball (MiLB). He made his professional debut with the Class-B High Point-Thomasville Hi-Toms in 1958. Davis then moved-up the organization, making stops at the Class-A Williamsport Grays (1959) and the Triple-A Buffalo Bisons (1960–1962) until he was called up to the major league Philadelphia Phillies in 1962.

After playing his only season in MLB, Davis continued to play in the minor leagues with the Triple-A Atlanta Crackers of the St. Louis Cardinals organization (1963); the Triple-A Buffalo Bisons, this time affiliated with the New York Mets (1963); the Triple-A Tacoma Giants in the San Francisco Giants organization (1963); the Triple-A Denver Bears in the Milwaukee Braves organization (1964); and the Triple-A Oklahoma City 89ers, and the Double-A San Antonio Bullets in the Houston Colt .45s organization (1964).

== Professional career ==
=== Philadelphia Phillies ===
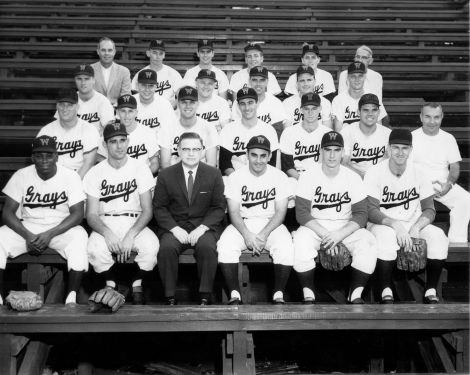
The 1959 Williamsport Grays, a team that Davis played on. Davis can be found in the third row from the back, second to the right.

At the age of 22, Davis was signed by the Philadelphia Phillies as an amateur free agent out of Baylor University. He was originally assigned to the Triple-A Miami Marlins of the International League, however, he began the season with the Class-B High Point-Thomasville Hi-Toms. Davis was a "bonus baby" meaning that he had to be kept on the Phillies 40-man roster due to the size of his contract. Davis suffered a broken ankle during a collision in spring training. During his first professional season, Davis batted .302 with 118 hits, 21 doubles, one triples, and 25 home runs in 106 games. Davis led the team in batting average, and home runs. He was tied for first in the Carolina League in home runs, and was third in batting average. In 1959, Davis was assigned to the Class-A Williamsport Grays. On the season, he batted .291 with 148 hits, 30 doubles, three triples, and 33 home runs in 139 games played. Davis led the Eastern League in home runs, a pace he had been on since at least mid-August.

Davis was promoted to the Triple-A Buffalo Bisons of the International League in 1960. With the Bisons, Davis batted .237 with 39 runs, 87 hits, 14 doubles, one triple, 18 home runs, 58 runs batted in (RBIs), and three stolen bases. He was tied for first on the Buffalo team in home runs. In 1961, Davis continued to play at the Triple-A level with the Bisons. On the season, he batted .303 with 65 runs, 131 hits, 31 doubles, five triples, 16 home runs, and 72 RBIs in 123 games. Davis was second on the team in doubles, triples, and RBIs. Before the start of the 1962 season, The Associated Press speculated that Davis would have a good chance at making the Phillies roster. Davis made his major league debut on April 19, 1962, against the Pittsburgh Pirates and went hitless in one at-bat. His first hit, a triple, came against the New York Mets on April 29. Davis' last game in the majors was on July 19. On the season, he batted .213 with nine runs, 16 hits, one triple, one home run, six RBIs, and one stolen base in 48 games. On the defensive end, Davis played 16 games in left field, seven games in right field, and five games in center field, and committed two errors in 26 total chances. After his stint with the Phillies, Davis was sent to the Triple-A Buffalo Bisons where he batted .244 with 33 runs, 47 hits, 11 doubles, one triple, 14 home runs, 31 RBIs, and two stolen bases.

=== Later career ===
On December 11, 1962, the Philadelphia Phillies traded Davis to the Los Angeles Angels for catcher Earl Averill, Jr. There were reportedly "contract difficulties" between the Angels and Davis, however, they worked it out and he agreed to terms on a contract in February. On March 29, 1963, the Angels traded Davis to the San Francisco Giants for first baseman Charlie Dees. Davis started the season with the Triple-A Tacoma Giants. With the Giants, he batted .174 with 29 hits, seven doubles, five home runs, and 17 RBIs in 56 games. In May, Davis joined the New York Mets organization and was assigned to the Triple-A Buffalo Bisons. On July 29, Davis was sent to the St. Louis Cardinals with cash considerations in exchange for outfielder Duke Carmel. Davis was then assigned to the Triple-A Atlanta Crackers in the Cardinals organization. Between the Bisons and Crackers, he batted .214 with 15 runs, 24 hits, two doubles, one triple, five home runs, and 13 RBIs in 43 games. In 1964, his last season in professional baseball, Davis split the season between the Triple-A Oklahoma City 89ers and the Double-A San Antonio Bullets in the Houston Colt .45s organization; and the Triple-A Denver Bears in the Milwaukee Braves organization. On the season, Davis batted a combined .143 with 18 runs, 28 hits, four doubles, six home runs, and 21 RBIs in 76 games between the 89ers, Bullets, and Bears.

== Coaching career ==
After his playing career was over, Davis coached baseball at Carthage High School in his hometown of Carthage, Texas. He spent nine seasons at the helm of the baseball program there until 1981 where he took a position at Panola College. During his time at Panola College, Davis won the conference coach of the year five times; coached the team to eight conference championship; and nine appearances in the National Junior College Athletic Association regional playoffs. He compiled a record of 501 wins and 292 losses. Davis coached 118 players who went on to sign with universities, 38 players who were drafted in the Major League Baseball draft, and five players who went on to play in Major League Baseball. After his coaching tenure that went from 1982 to 1996 was over, Davis was elected to the Panola College Athletic Hall of Fame.
