= Ed Sukla =

American baseball player (1943–2015)

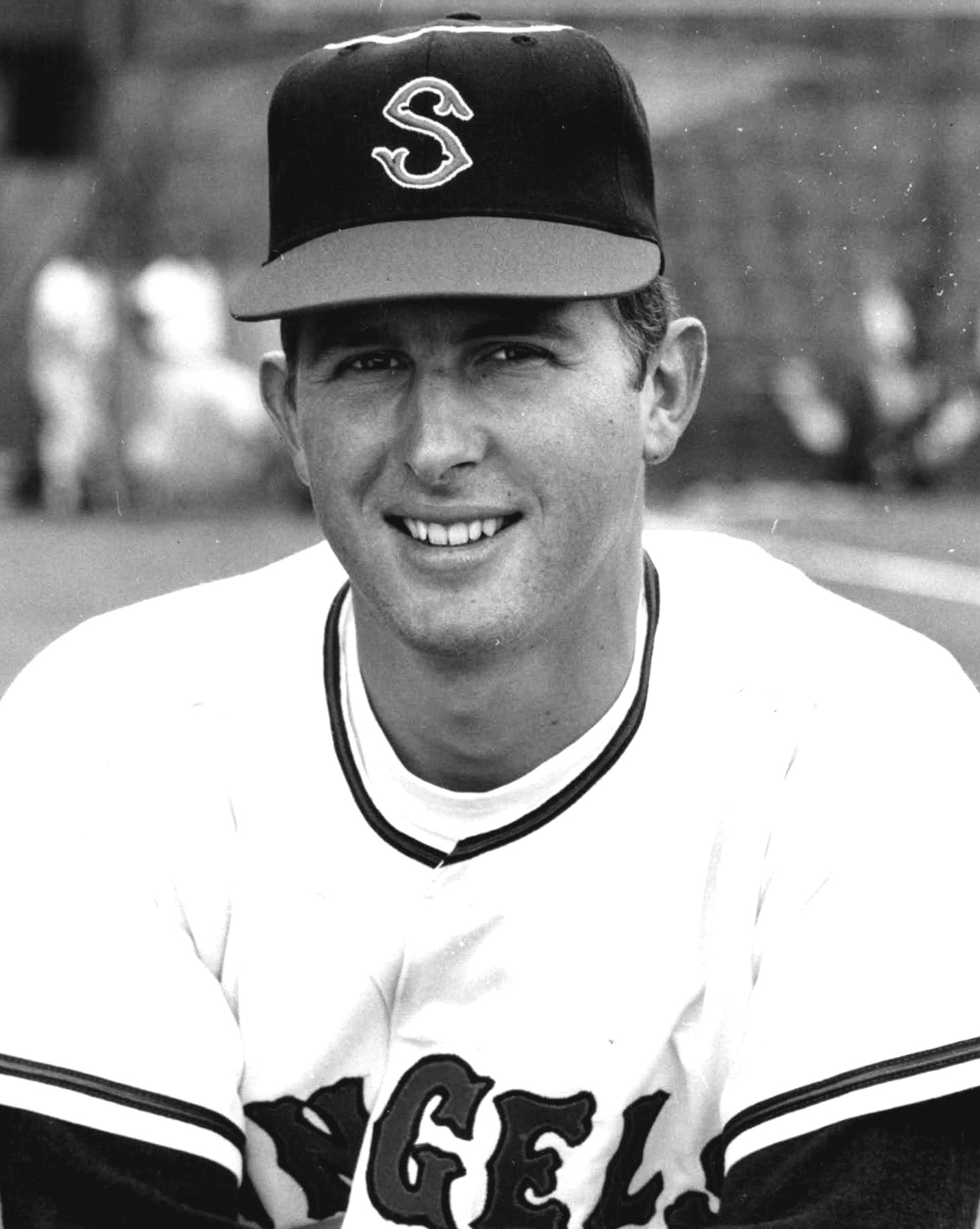
- Relief pitcher
- Born: March 3, 1943; Long Beach, California, U.S.
- Died: September 24, 2015 (aged 72); Irvine, California, U.S.
- Batted: Right Threw: Right

MLB debut
- September 17, 1964, for the Los Angeles Angels

Last MLB appearance
- May 22, 1966, for the California Angels

MLB statistics
- Win–loss record: 3–5
- Earned run average: 5.26
- Strikeouts: 26
- Stats at Baseball Reference

Teams
- Los Angeles / California Angels (1964–1966)

Edward Anthony Sukla (March 3, 1943 – September 24, 2015) was an American professional baseball player, a right-handed relief pitcher who appeared in 39 games over portions of three seasons (1964–66) for the Los Angeles / California Angels of Major League Baseball. The native of Long Beach, California, was listed as 5 feet 11 inches (1.80 m) tall and 170 pounds (77 kg). He signed with the Angels in 1962 after graduating from high school in Huntington Beach, California.

On April 20, 1966, Sukla was the winning pitcher in the second game ever played at Anaheim Stadium—the first triumph ever recorded by the Angels in their new home ballpark. He hurled 12/3 scoreless innings against the Chicago White Sox, allowing no hits with two bases on balls and one strikeout, as the Angels defeated the Chicago White Sox 4–3 in extra innings. It would be the third and last victory of Sukla's big-league career.

Sent to the minor leagues after May 22, Sukla went on to pitch another ten seasons in pro ball. His 14-year career included a dozen seasons in the Triple-A Pacific Coast League. He retired from the field after the 1975 season. In the majors, he lost five of eight decisions and logged four saves during his 39-game career. He allowed 52 hits and 17 bases on balls in 511/3 innings pitched, with 26 strikeouts. His career earned run average was 5.26. In the minors, he worked in 492 games and posted a 78–59 record in 1,141 innings pitched.

After retiring from the mound, Sukla became a scout for the Major League Baseball Scouting Bureau and was named "Scout of the Year" in 2007. He died at age 72 in Irvine, California following a 9-year battle with osteosarcoma.
