= 1962 Major League Baseball All-Star Game (first game) =

1962 American baseball competition

	1	2	3	4	5	6	7	8	9	R	H	E
National League	0	0	0	0	0	2	0	1	0	3	8	0
American League	0	0	0	0	0	1	0	0	0	1	4	0
- Date: July 10, 1962
- Venue: D.C. Stadium
- City: Washington, D.C.
- Managers: Fred Hutchinson (CIN); Ralph Houk (NYY)
- MVP: Maury Wills (LAD)
- Attendance: 45,480
- Ceremonial first pitch: President John F. Kennedy
- Television: NBC
- TV announcers: Mel Allen and Joe Garagiola
- Radio: NBC
- Radio announcers: Lindsey Nelson and John MacLean

The first 1962 Major League Baseball All-Star Game was the 32nd playing of Major League Baseball's annual midsummer exhibition game between the American League and National League. The game took place at Washington, D.C.'s D.C. Stadium, home of the American League's Washington Senators. The stadium was in its first year of use as the Senators' home field. President John F. Kennedy was the second president to attend the event and threw out the first pitch. A highlight of the game was the first presentation of the Arch Ward Trophy. It was first presented in 1962 as a tribute to the man who helped found the All-Star Game in 1933. That first presentation went to Leon Wagner of the Los Angeles Angels (second game MVP) and to Maury Wills of the Los Angeles Dodgers (first game MVP), because two Midsummer Classics were played.

The spotlight on this game belonged to Maury Wills. Entering the lineup in the sixth inning to pinch-run for Stan Musial, he stole second then scored the first run of the game off a Dick Groat single. In the eighth inning, Wills reached base by a single. He rounded second on a short single hit by Jim Davenport to left field. Wills reached third base safely and scored on a foul out to right field moments later. This performance earned him the first All-Star Most Valuable Player Award. Roberto Clemente was a key contributor with three hits in the game.

== Roster ==
New York Yankees manager Ralph Houk's coaching staff included Billy Hitchcock of the Baltimore Orioles and Jim "Mickey" Vernon of the Washington Senators, while Cincinnati Reds manager Fred Hutchinson's staff included Casey Stengel of the New York Mets and Johnny Keane of the St. Louis Cardinals.

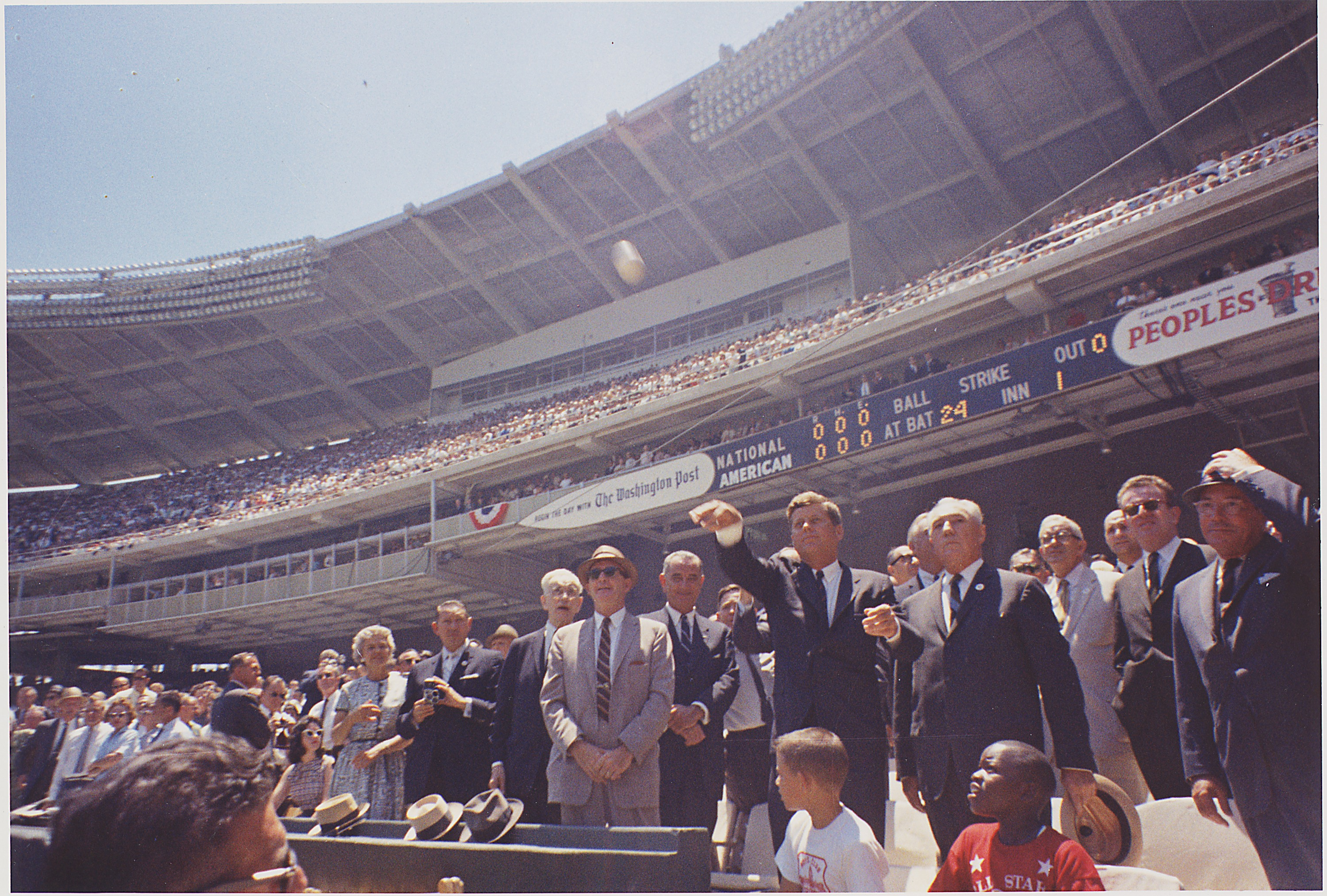
President John F. Kennedy throwing out the first pitch at the 1962 All-Star game.

Players in italics have since been inducted into the National Baseball Hall of Fame.

=== National League ===
Starters
Position	Player	Team	All-Star Games
P	Don Drysdale	Dodgers	4
C	Del Crandall	Braves	10
1B	Orlando Cepeda	Giants	7
2B	Bill Mazeroski	Pirates	6
3B	Ken Boyer	Cardinals	8
SS	Dick Groat	Pirates	5
OF	Roberto Clemente	Pirates	5
OF	Tommy Davis	Dodgers	1
OF	Willie Mays	Giants	12

Pitchers
Position	Player	Team	All-Star Games
P	Turk Farrell	Colt .45s	2
P	Bob Gibson	Cardinals	1
P	Sandy Koufax	Dodgers	3
P	Juan Marichal	Giants	1
P	Bob Purkey	Reds	4
P	Bob Shaw	Braves	1
P	Warren Spahn (Note: Replacement for injured player)	Braves	15

Reserves
Position	Player	Team	All-Star Games
C	John Roseboro	Dodgers	4
1B	Ernie Banks	Cubs	10
2B	Frank Bolling	Braves	3
3B	Jim Davenport	Giants	1
SS	Maury Wills	Dodgers	3
OF	Hank Aaron (Note: Replaced due to injury)	Braves	11
OF	Felipe Alou	Giants	1
OF	Richie Ashburn	Mets	5
OF	Johnny Callison	Phillies	1
OF	Stan Musial	Cardinals	22

=== American League ===
Starters
Position	Player	Team	All-Star Games
P	Jim Bunning	Tigers	5
C	Earl Battey	Twins	1
1B	Jim Gentile	Orioles	5
2B	Billy Moran	Angels	1
3B	Rich Rollins	Twins	1
SS	Luis Aparicio	White Sox	7
OF	Mickey Mantle	Yankees	14
OF	Roger Maris	Yankees	6
OF	Leon Wagner	Angels	1

Pitchers
Position	Player	Team	All-Star Games
P	Hank Aguirre	Tigers	1
P	Dick Donovan	Indians	4
P	Bill Monbouquette	Red Sox	3
P	Milt Pappas	Orioles	1
P	Camilo Pascual	Twins	5
P	Dave Stenhouse	Senators	1
P	Ralph Terry	Yankees	1
P	Hoyt Wilhelm	Orioles	6

Reserves
Position	Player	Team	All-Star Games
C	Elston Howard	Yankees	8
C	Johnny Romano	Indians	3
1B	Norm Siebern	Athletics	1
2B	Bobby Richardson	Yankees	3
3B	Brooks Robinson	Orioles	5
SS	Tom Tresh	Yankees	1
OF	Rocky Colavito	Tigers	5
OF	Jim Landis	White Sox	1
OF	Lee Thomas	Angels	1

== Game ==
=== Starting lineups ===
National League				American League			
Order	Player	Team	Position	Order	Player	Team	Position
1	Dick Groat	Pirates	SS	1	Rich Rollins	Twins	3B
2	Roberto Clemente	Pirates	RF	2	Billy Moran	Angels	2B
3	Willie Mays	Giants	CF	3	Roger Maris	Yankees	CF
4	Orlando Cepeda	Giants	1B	4	Mickey Mantle	Yankees	RF
5	Tommy Davis	Dodgers	LF	5	Jim Gentile	Orioles	1B
6	Ken Boyer	Cardinals	3B	6	Leon Wagner	Angels	LF
7	Del Crandall	Braves	C	7	Earl Battey	Twins	C
8	Bill Mazeroski	Pirates	2B	8	Luis Aparicio	White Sox	SS
9	Don Drysdale	Dodgers	P	9	Jim Bunning	Tigers	P

== Umpires ==
Position	Umpire
Home Plate	Eddie Hurley (AL)
First Base	Augie Donatelli (NL)
Second Base	Bob Stewart (AL)
Third Base	Tony Venzon (NL)
Left Field	Harry Schwarts (AL)
Right Field	Mel Steiner (NL)

=== Game summary ===
Tuesday, July 10, 1962 1:00 pm (ET) at District of Columbia Stadium in Washington, D.C.
Team	1	2	3	4	5	6	7	8	9	R	H	E
National League	0	0	0	0	0	2	0	1	0	3	8	0
American League	0	0	0	0	0	1	0	0	0	1	4	0
WP: Juan Marichal (1-0) LP: Camilo Pascual (0-1)
