= Bob Perry (baseball) =

American baseball player (1934-2017)

- Outfielder
- Born: September 14, 1934; New Bern, North Carolina, U.S.
- Died: July 2, 2017 (aged 82); New Bern, North Carolina, U.S.
- Batted: Right Threw: Right

MLB debut
- May 17, 1963, for the Los Angeles Angels

Last MLB appearance
- October 3, 1964, for the Los Angeles Angels

MLB statistics
- Batting average: .266
- Home runs: 6
- Runs batted in: 30
- Stats at Baseball Reference

Teams
- Los Angeles Angels (1963–1964)

Melvin Gray "Bob" Perry (September 14, 1934 – July 2, 2017) was an American professional baseball player who appeared in 131 games over parts of two seasons for the 1963–1964 Los Angeles Angels of Major League Baseball. An outfielder, Perry was born in New Bern, North Carolina, where he graduated from high school; he threw and batted right-handed, stood 6 feet 2 inches (1.88 m) tall and weighed 180 pounds (82 kg).

Perry signed with the New York Giants in 1953, but spent a decade in the club's farm system—never reaching the major leagues—until the relocated San Francisco Giants sold his contract to the Angels on May 16, 1963. Along the way, Perry had one season of 30 home runs, and four campaigns of 20 or more long balls.

The Angels immediately plugged Perry into their starting lineup at Yankee Stadium on May 17, 1963, and the 28-year-old rookie went one for four against Jim Bouton in a 4–3 loss. Perry got into 61 contests for the 1963 Angels, starting 23 games as the club's right fielder and 19 more as its center fielder. He batted .253 with 42 hits. In 1964, Perry appeared in 70 games, 55 as the starting center fielder, and improved his production to .276 in 221 at bats. He also spent part of the year at Triple-A Hawaii.

But 1964 was Perry's last MLB season. On February 1, 1965, the Angels traded him to the Pittsburgh Pirates for infielder Julio Gotay, and Perry spent the remainder of his pro career in the minors, where he hit over 200 lifetime home runs. He retired in 1970 as he neared his 36th birthday.

As a big-leaguer, Bob Perry collected 103 total hits, with 17 doubles and one triple to go along with his six home runs; he had 30 career runs batted in. During his brief MLB career, Perry had three three-hit games. On July 15, 1964, in the second game of a twi-night doubleheader, he had three hits and a base on balls in four plate appearances against the Detroit Tigers at Dodger Stadium; his solo home run in the eighth inning off Phil Regan provided the winning margin for eventual 1964 Cy Young Award-winner Dean Chance in a 1–0 Angel victory.

Perry died in New Bern on July 2, 2017.
