= Duke Carmel =

American baseball player (1937–2021)

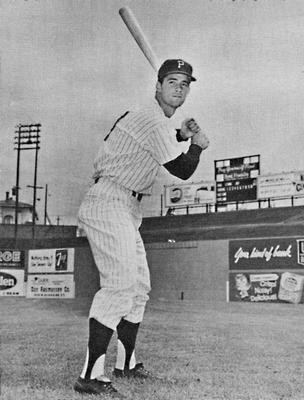
- Outfielder / First baseman
- Born: April 23, 1937; New York, New York, U.S.
- Died: August 3, 2021 (aged 84); New Orleans, Louisiana, U.S.
- Batted: Left Threw: Left

MLB debut
- September 10, 1959, for the St. Louis Cardinals

Last MLB appearance
- May 2, 1965, for the New York Yankees

MLB statistics
- Batting average: .211
- Home runs: 4
- Runs batted in: 23
- Stats at Baseball Reference

Teams
- St. Louis Cardinals (1959–1960; 1963); New York Mets (1963); New York Yankees (1965)

Leon James "Duke" Carmel (April 23, 1937 – August 3, 2021) was an American professional baseball player. Carmel played in 124 games over all or parts of four seasons in Major League Baseball between 1959 and 1965 for the St. Louis Cardinals, New York Mets and New York Yankees, primarily as an outfielder.

== Career ==
Carmel threw and batted left-handed; he was listed as 6 feet 3 inches (1.91 m) tall and 202 pounds (92 kg). A native of New York City, he graduated from Ben Franklin High School in East Harlem. Carmel signed with the Cardinals in 1955, and in his third minor league season, in the Class C Pioneer League, he was selected to the All-Star team after leading the circuit in runs scored (118) and runs batted in (121). He also batted a career-high .324.

He had his MLB debut in September 1959, starting six games as the Cardinals' center fielder, but he collected only three hits and one base on balls in 24 plate appearances. After an additional trial, in September 1960, Carmel spent all of 1961 and 1962 in the minor leagues (including service in the Los Angeles Dodgers and Cleveland Indians organizations) before returning to the major leagues in 1963 for his only full season. Beginning the year with the Cardinals, he appeared in 57 games, mostly as a pinch hitter. His first game of 1963, on April 16 against the Pittsburgh Pirates, was a memorable one: as a pinch hitter, he struck a ninth-inning, game-tying home run off Elroy Face, setting the table as the Cardinals scored the winning run two batters later. But by July 18, Carmel was batting only .227 with ten hits in 53 at bats. On July 29, he was traded to the Mets for another outfielder, Jacke Davis.

Carmel then became the Mets' starting first baseman. With regular play, his offensive performance perked up, and on August 8 at the Polo Grounds he had perhaps his best day as a major leaguer. Playing against his old team, the Cardinals, Carmel went three for four, hitting his second career home run in the eighth inning, facing left-handed relief pitcher Bobby Shantz, to win the game, 3–2. Although Carmel had two more three-hit games, on September 2 and 26, he hit only .175 during that month, dropping his season average to .233, with four home runs and 20 runs batted in.

He was then assigned outright to the Buffalo Bisons, the Mets' Triple-A affiliate, for the entire 1964 season. Carmel responded by blasting a career-high 35 homers, four behind league leader Mack Jones' 39. His power display earned Carmel one final MLB trial. Selected by the Yankees in the Rule 5 draft, he began 1965 on the Bombers' roster, playing under his old St. Louis manager, Johnny Keane. But he went hitless in eight at bats, and after May 2 he was sent back to Buffalo. He retired after the 1967 minor league season. All told, he collected 48 hits in the majors, with seven doubles, three triples and four home runs, batting .211 lifetime with 23 runs batted in.
