= 1963 Major League Baseball All-Star Game =

1963 American baseball competition

	1	2	3	4	5	6	7	8	9	R	H	E
National League	0	1	2	0	1	0	0	1	0	5	6	0
American League	0	1	2	0	0	0	0	0	0	3	11	1
- Date: July 9, 1963
- Venue: Cleveland Municipal Stadium
- City: Cleveland, Ohio
- Managers: Alvin Dark (SF); Ralph Houk (NYY)
- Television: NBC
- TV announcers: Vin Scully and Joe Garagiola
- Radio: NBC
- Radio announcers: Bob Neal and George Bryson

The 1963 Major League Baseball All-Star Game was the 34th playing of the midsummer classic between the all-stars of the American League (AL) and National League (NL), the two leagues comprising Major League Baseball. The game was held on July 9, 1963 in Cleveland, Ohio, at Cleveland Municipal Stadium, home of the American League's Cleveland Indians. The game was won by the National League 5–3.

From 1959 to 1962, baseball experimented with a pair of All-Star Games per year. That ended with this 1963 game, which also marked the 30th anniversary of the inaugural All-Star Game played in Chicago in 1933.

== Scoring summary ==
The teams traded runs in the second inning. Willie Mays drew a walk off Ken McBride, stole second and scored on a Dick Groat single. The AL tied the score when Jim O'Toole gave up a Leon Wagner single, hit Zoilo Versalles with a pitch and surrendered an RBI hit to his pitching counterpart, McBride.

In the third, both sides scored twice. Behind 3-1, the AL struck back on a double by Albie Pearson and singles by Frank Malzone and Earl Battey to tie it at 3-all.

The NL scratched out a run off Jim Bunning in the fifth to regain the lead, then made it 5-3 in the eighth when Bill White singled off Dick Radatz, stole second and scored on a Ron Santo single. Don Drysdale closed it out in the eighth and ninth, retiring Bobby Richardson on a game-ending double play.

== Rosters ==
Players in italics have since been inducted into the National Baseball Hall of Fame.

=== National League ===
Starters
Position	Player	Team	All-Star Games
P	Jim O'Toole	Reds	1
C	Ed Bailey	Giants	6
1B	Bill White	Cardinals	6
2B	Bill Mazeroski-x	Pirates	8
3B	Ken Boyer	Cardinals	10
SS	Dick Groat	Cardinals	7
OF	Hank Aaron	Braves	13
OF	Tommy Davis	Dodgers	3
OF	Willie Mays	Giants	14

Pitchers
Position	Player	Team	All-Star Games
P	Ray Culp	Phillies	1
P	Don Drysdale	Dodgers	5
P	Larry Jackson	Cubs	5
P	Sandy Koufax	Dodgers	4
P	Juan Marichal	Giants	3
P	Warren Spahn	Braves	17
P	Hal Woodeshick	Colt .45s	1

Reserves
Position	Player	Team	All-Star Games
C	Johnny Edwards	Reds	1
C	Joe Torre	Braves	1
1B	Orlando Cepeda	Giants	9
2B	Julián Javier-y	Cardinals	1
3B	Ron Santo	Cubs	1
SS	Maury Wills	Dodgers	5
OF	Roberto Clemente	Pirates	7
OF	Willie McCovey	Giants	1
OF	Stan Musial	Cardinals	24
OF	Duke Snider	Mets	8

=== American League ===
Starters
Position	Player	Team	All-Star Games
P	Ken McBride	Angels	3
C	Earl Battey	Twins	3
1B	Joe Pepitone	Yankees	1
2B	Nellie Fox	White Sox	15
3B	Frank Malzone	Red Sox	7
SS	Zoilo Versalles	Twins	1
OF	Al Kaline	Tigers	12
OF	Albie Pearson	Angels	1
OF	Leon Wagner	Angels	3

Pitchers
Position	Player	Team	All-Star Games
P	Steve Barber-x	Orioles	1
P	Jim Bouton	Yankees	1
P	Jim Bunning	Tigers	7
P	Mudcat Grant	Indians	1
P	Bill Monbouquette-y	Red Sox	4
P	Juan Pizarro	White Sox	1
P	Dick Radatz	Red Sox	1

Reserves
Position	Player	Team	All-Star Games
C	Elston Howard	Yankees	10
C	Don Leppert	Senators	1
1B-OF	Norm Siebern	Athletics	3
2B	Bobby Richardson	Yankees	5
3B	Brooks Robinson	Orioles	7
SS	Luis Aparicio	Orioles	9
OF	Bob Allison	Twins	2
OF	Harmon Killebrew	Twins	5
OF	Mickey Mantle-x	Yankees	16
OF	Tom Tresh	Yankees	3
OF	Carl Yastrzemski	Red Sox	1

x - injured

y - replacement for injured player

Note: Bill Mazeroski was selected for the starting lineup, but did not play due to injury. Julián Javier took his spot in the starting batting order.

== Game ==
=== Starting lineups ===
National League				American League			
Order	Player	Team	Position	Order	Player	Team	Position
1	Tommy Davis	Dodgers	LF	1	Nellie Fox	White Sox	2B
2	Hank Aaron	Braves	RF	2	Albie Pearson	Angels	CF
3	Bill White	Cardinals	1B	3	Al Kaline	Tigers	RF
4	Willie Mays	Giants	CF	4	Frank Malzone	Red Sox	3B
5	Ed Bailey	Giants	C	5	Leon Wagner	Angels	LF
6	Ken Boyer	Cardinals	3B	6	Earl Battey	Twins	C
7	Dick Groat	Cardinals	SS	7	Joe Pepitone	Yankees	1B
8	Julián Javier	Cardinals	2B	8	Zoilo Versalles	Twins	SS
9	Jim O'Toole	Reds	P	9	Ken McBride	Angels	P

=== Umpires ===
Position	Umpire
Home Plate	Hank Soar (AL)
First Base	Bill Jackowski (NL)
Second Base	Al Smith (AL)
Third Base	Paul Pryor (NL)
Left Field	Bill Haller (AL)
Right Field	Doug Harvey (NL)

=== Game summary ===
Tuesday, July 9, 1963 1:00 pm (ET) at Municipal Stadium in Cleveland, Ohio
Team	1	2	3	4	5	6	7	8	9	R	H	E
National League	0	1	2	0	1	0	0	1	0	5	6	0
American League	0	1	2	0	0	0	0	0	0	3	11	1
WP: Larry Jackson (1-0) LP: Jim Bunning (0-1)
