= Lou Clinton =

American baseball player (1937–1997)

- Clinton with the Red Sox, c. 1962
- Right fielder
- Born: October 13, 1937; Ponca City, Oklahoma, U.S.
- Died: December 6, 1997 (aged 60); Wichita, Kansas, U.S.
- Batted: Right Threw: Right

MLB debut
- April 22, 1960, for the Boston Red Sox

Last MLB appearance
- April 30, 1967, for the New York Yankees

MLB statistics
- Batting average: .247
- Home runs: 65
- Runs batted in: 269
- Stats at Baseball Reference

Teams
- Boston Red Sox (1960–1964); Los Angeles / California Angels (1964–1965); Kansas City Athletics (1965); Cleveland Indians (1965); New York Yankees (1966–1967)

Luciean Louis Clinton (October 13, 1937 – December 6, 1997), nicknamed Lu or Lou, was an American Major League Baseball outfielder who batted and threw right-handed. His major league career spanned eight seasons (1960–1967), during which he played for five American League teams; the Boston Red Sox, Los Angeles/California Angels, Kansas City Athletics, Cleveland Indians and New York Yankees.

== Early years ==
Clinton was born in Ponca City, Oklahoma. He was signed by the Red Sox as an amateur free agent before the 1955 season.

== Career ==
Clinton made his major league debut in 1960, and spent five seasons with the Red Sox, batting .252 with 49 home runs and 198 RBIs. Clinton was involved in an odd play on August 9, 1960. In the bottom of the fifth inning with a Cleveland runner on base, Vic Power of the Indians hit a line drive that bounced off of the right field fence in Cleveland; the ball hit Clinton's foot and flew over the fence. Umpire Al Smith ruled that the ball never touched the ground and was a home run. The odd play was also scored as a home run with no error being assigned to Clinton. Clinton was playing right field for Boston on the final day of the 1961 season, when Roger Maris hit his 61st home run; Clinton ran back to the right field wall, but the ball went over him into the stands at Yankee Stadium. Clinton hit for the cycle on July 13, 1962, in a 15-inning Red Sox win in Kansas City; he batted 5-for-7 and had the game winning RBI.

On June 4, 1964, Clinton was traded to the Angels for Lee Thomas. After a season and a half with the Angels, Clinton was selected off waivers by the Athletics on September 7, 1965. After appearing in a single game for the Athletics, the waiver claim was voided; Clinton was then claimed by the Indians. He finished the season with Cleveland, and on January 14, 1966, he was traded to the Yankees for Doc Edwards. Clinton played for the Yankees until May 1967, his last major league appearances. In his eight major league seasons, he batted .247 in 691 games played, with 65 home runs and 269 RBIs.

On May 11, 1967, Clinton's contract was purchased by the Philadelphia Phillies and he was assigned to their Triple-A Pacific Coast League team, the San Diego Padres. He played 110 games for the Padres through the remainder of the season, batting .250, and then retired.

== Later years ==
After his retirement, Clinton entered the oil business in Wichita, Kansas, with his uncle. Clinton died of Creutzfeldt-Jakob disease at age 60 in Wichita, and is buried at Lakeview Cemetery there.

== See also ==
- List of Major League Baseball players to hit for the cycle

Achievements
Preceded by Ken Boyer	Hitting for the cycle July 13, 1962	Succeeded by Johnny Callison
