= Charlie Dees =

American baseball player (born 1935)

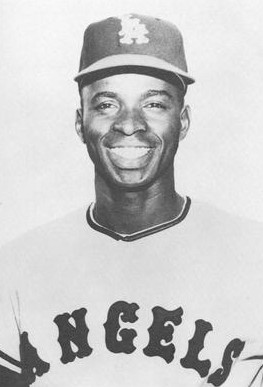
- First baseman
- Born: June 24, 1935 (age 91); Birmingham, Alabama, U.S.
- Batted: Left Threw: Left

MLB debut
- May 26, 1963, for the Los Angeles Angels

Last MLB appearance
- October 2, 1965, for the California Angels

MLB statistics
- Batting average: .265
- Home runs: 3
- Runs batted in: 29
- Stats at Baseball Reference

Teams
- Los Angeles/California Angels (1963–1965)

Charles Henry Dees (born June 24, 1935) is an American former professional baseball player whose career extended from 1957 through 1966. The first baseman appeared in 98 games played in Major League Baseball over parts of three seasons (1963–65) for the Los Angeles/California Angels. He threw and batted left-handed, and was listed as 6 feet 1 inch (1.85 m) tall and 173 pounds (78 kg).

Dees was born in Birmingham, Alabama. He played for the Louisville Clippers of the Negro leagues in 1957 before signing with the San Francisco Giants' organization the following year. He batted over .300 in three of his first five minor league seasons, culminating with a breakout year for the 1962 El Paso Sun Kings of the Double-A Texas League. Dees led the Texas circuit in batting (.348) and hits (179), and reached career highs in home runs (23) and runs batted in (115). He was selected as a member of the Texas League all-star team. The following March, the Giants sold his contract to the Angels.

Dees split 1963 between the big-league Angels and their Triple-A affiliate, the Hawaii Islanders, and batted over .300 at both levels. In his MLB debut, May 26 at Dodger Stadium, he doubled off Orlando Peña of the Kansas City Athletics in his first at bat, driving home baserunner Billy Moran for his first big-league run batted in.

Then Dees embarked on a torrid stretch at the plate. Over his first 20 games, he batted .382 and took over the Angels' starting first base job. But in the middle of June, his hot hitting began to cool. During a 4-for-35 drought that lasted into early July, his average fell below .300 and he was sent back to Hawaii at month's end, batting .281. Recalled to Los Angeles in September, however, he enjoyed another hot stretch, particularly against the Boston Red Sox. Dees started ten games between September 9 and 28, and put up six multi-hit contests, with four three-hit games. Three of those came against Boston, against whom he went 11-for-21 (.524). He finished his rookie year at .307 in 60 games for the Angels.

But Dees' 1964 season was disastrous. He began the year as a pinch hitter and started only three games for the Angels in almost two months. Worse, he collected only two hits and one base on balls in 28 plate appearances, and was batting .077 when the Angels loaned Dees to the Houston Colt .45s' top affiliate, the Oklahoma City 89ers, where he played the rest of the season and batted only .257. The Angels retained his rights, however, and in 1965 optioned him to the Triple-A Seattle Angels and then to the Double-A Sun Kings, which was now an Angels' affiliate. Back in the hitting-friendly confines of El Paso, three years after his strong 1962 campaign for the Sun Kings, the 30-year-old Dees batted .377 and earned a last call-up to the Angels in September. But his struggles continued: he hit only .156 in 12 games.

Dees split 1966 between Triple-A and Double-A before leaving baseball.

In his three seasons with the Angels, Dees batted .265. His 69 hits included 12 doubles, one triple and three home runs.
