= Julio Gotay =

Puerto Rican baseball player (1939–2008)

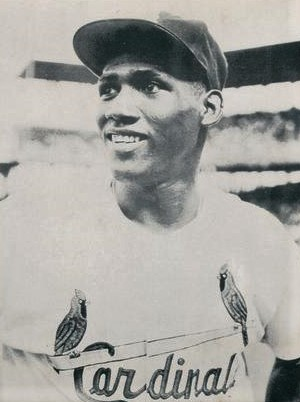
- Shortstop
- Born: April 9, 1939; Fajardo, Puerto Rico
- Died: July 4, 2008 (aged 69); Ponce, Puerto Rico
- Batted: Right Threw: Right

MLB debut
- August 6, 1960, for the St. Louis Cardinals

Last MLB appearance
- September 23, 1969, for the Houston Astros

MLB statistics
- Batting average: .260
- Home runs: 6
- Runs batted in: 70
- Stats at Baseball Reference

Teams
- St. Louis Cardinals (1960–1962); Pittsburgh Pirates (1963–1964); Los Angeles Angels (1965); Houston Astros (1966–1969)

Julio Enrique Gotay Sánchez (April 9, 1939 – July 4, 2008) was a Puerto Rican professional baseball player, a shortstop and second baseman who played all or parts of ten seasons (1960–69) for the St. Louis Cardinals, Pittsburgh Pirates, Los Angeles Angels and Houston Astros of Major League Baseball. Born in Fajardo, he threw and batted right-handed, stood 6 feet (1.8 m) tall and weighed 180 pounds (82 kg). He was the uncle of infielder Rubén Gotay.

== Career ==
He made his major league debut at age 21 on August 6, 1960, as the host Cardinals defeated the Cincinnati Reds 6–5. In his first career at-bat, pinch-hitting for pitcher Ed Bauta in the sixth inning, he singled off Cincinnati southpaw Joe Nuxhall for his first big-league hit.

Gotay had his most productive season for the Cardinals in 1962. He started 105 games at shortstop and batted .255 with two home runs, 12 doubles and 27 runs batted in in 406 plate appearances. But on November 19, he was sent to the Pirates in a four-player trade that brought veteran shortstop and 1960 National League Most Valuable Player Dick Groat to St. Louis. Groat would help lead the Cardinals to a second-place finish in 1963 and the 1964 World Championship and start at shortstop on the 1963 and 1964 National League All-Star teams.

Meanwhile, Gotay could not beat out Ducky Schofield for the Pirates' shortstop job in 1963 and was sent to Triple-A. He would appear in only seven games for Pittsburgh during the 1963 and 1964 campaigns. As a utility infielder, he spent a half-season with the Angels in 1965, then appeared in one full season and parts of three others for the Astros (1966–69). He retired from baseball after the 1971 minor-league season, which he spent at Triple-A in the Cardinals' organization. In 389 games played in the major leagues, Gotay collected 257 hits, with 38 doubles, three triples, six home runs and 70 RBI.

According to teammate Jim Bouton, Gotay was also known for "carrying a dead fish on plane trips to ward off evil spirits." And he "was also famous for having a cheese sandwich fall out of his back pocket. While he was sliding into second base."

After retiring from baseball, he earned a bachelor degree in education and spent many years as a physical education teacher in Ponce, Puerto Rico.

Gotay died from prostate cancer on July 4, 2008, at age 69 in Ponce. He was buried at the Fajardo Municipal Cemetery in Fajardo, Puerto Rico. He was married to his wife, Silvia Irizarry, for 48 years. He had four children, Julio Gotay, Agustín Gotay, Irma Gotay, and Silvia Gotay.
