= Al Smith (umpire) =

American baseball umpire (1925-2006)

- Born: William Alaric Smith; June 11, 1925; Bossier City, Louisiana, U.S.
- Died: November 14, 2006 (aged 81); Bossier City, Louisiana, U.S.
- Occupation: Umpire
- Years active: 1960-1964
- Employer: American League

William Alaric Smith (June 11, 1925 - November 14, 2006) was an American professional baseball umpire who worked in the American League from 1960 to 1964. Smith umpired 798 major league games in his 5-year career. He umpired in the 1964 World Series, and two All-Star Games (1961 and 1963).
