= Aubrey Gatewood =

American baseball player (1938–2019)

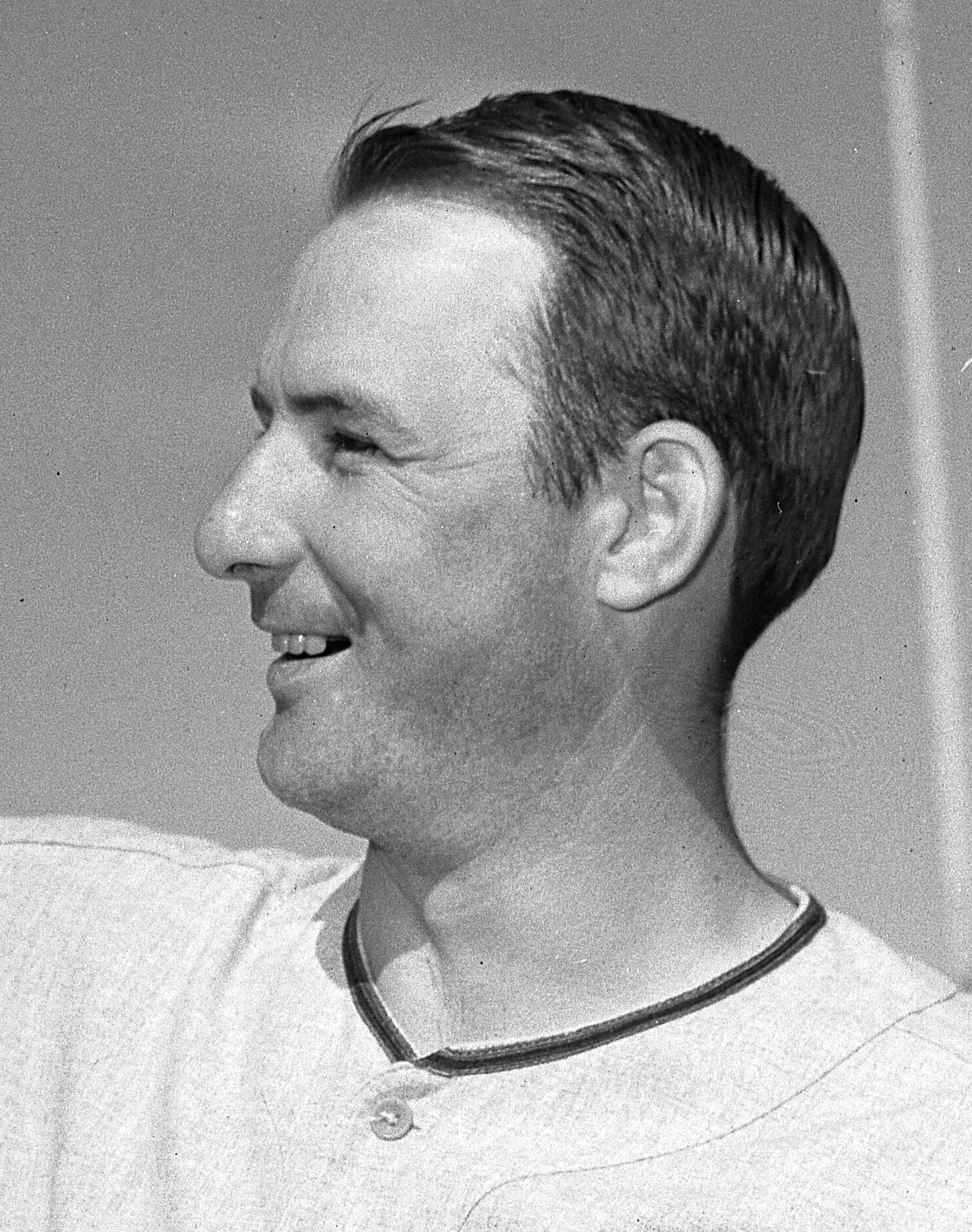
- Gatewood in 1964
- Relief pitcher
- Born: November 17, 1938; Little Rock, Arkansas, U.S.
- Died: June 5, 2019 (aged 80); North Little Rock, Arkansas, U.S.
- Batted: Right Threw: Right

MLB debut
- September 11, 1963, for the Los Angeles Angels

Last MLB appearance
- July 8, 1970, for the Atlanta Braves

MLB statistics
- Win–loss record: 8–9
- Earned run average: 2.78
- Strikeouts: 75
- Stats at Baseball Reference

Teams
- Los Angeles/California Angels (1963–1965); Atlanta Braves (1970)

Aubrey Lee Gatewood (November 17, 1938 – June 5, 2019) was an American professional baseball pitcher who appeared in 68 games over all or portions of four seasons for the Los Angeles/California Angels and Atlanta Braves of Major League Baseball. Born in Little Rock, Arkansas, he threw and batted right-handed and was listed as 6 feet 1 inch (1.85 m) tall and 170 pounds (77 kg).

== Playing career ==
Gatewood was a graduate of North Little Rock High School and Arkansas State University. He signed with the Detroit Tigers in 1960 and won 11 games in his debut pro season, which was split between the Class C Northern League and Class B Carolina League. During the offseason, he was selected by the brand-new Los Angeles Angels with the 11th pick in the 1960 American League expansion draft. Gatewood struggled to a 3–10 record and a mediocre 4.64 earned run average for three teams ranging from Class B to Triple-A in 1961. His poor record notwithstanding, he was taken from the Angels in the 1961 Rule 5 draft by another expansion team, the New York Mets, who were set to enter the National League in 1962. But when Gatewood could not crack the Mets' maiden roster in spring training, he was offered back to the Angel organization, where he divided his 1962 campaign between Triple-A and Class B affiliates.

Gatewood spent the full minor league season of 1963 with the Double-A Nashville Vols, where he made 20 starts and posted a 3.95 ERA. His campaign earned him a September call-up to the Angels for his first taste of major league service. In his first-ever MLB game, on September 11, 1963, he started against the Boston Red Sox at Chavez Ravine and earned a complete game, 4–1 victory. Gatewood permitted only four hits and one base on balls, striking out five. Gatewood had a shutout until the ninth inning, when Red Sox slugger Dick Stuart led off with a triple and scored two batters later on Russ Nixon's sacrifice fly. Gatewood would make another dozen starts as a big leaguer, but his MLB debut would witness his only career complete game. He appeared in four total games that September and put up a stellar ERA of 1.50 in 24 innings pitched.

After he spent the first three months of 1964 at Triple-A, Gatewood returned to the Angels in July. He once again posted a strong earned run average (2.24, in 15 total games, including seven starts, and 601/3 innings pitched). That performance paved the way for Gatewood's only full year in the majors, 1965. Working in 46 games, among them three starts, he won four of nine decisions and compiled a 3.42 ERA in 92 innings. But 1965 would be Gatewood's last year in an Angel uniform. He was sent to the minor leagues in 1966, then acquired by the Cincinnati Reds, signaling a journeyman phase of his career that would see him pitch for five different MLB organizations through 1971. Only during the midpoint of the 1970 season would Gatewood again experience the major leagues, when he worked in three games in relief for the Atlanta Braves. His first two appearances as a Brave were effective ones; but in his third, on July 8, Gatewood allowed six runs (although only one was earned) in only one-third of an inning in a 13–0 pasting at the hands of the San Francisco Giants.

It was Gatewood's last game in the big leagues. During his 68-game MLB career, he compiled an 8–9 won–lost record and a 2.78 career earned run average; in 1781/3 innings pitched, he permitted 166 hits and 67 bases on balls, striking out 75. Gatewood's last pro season was 1971. He died in North Little Rock on June 5, 2019.
