= Fred Newman (baseball) =

American baseball player (1942–1987)

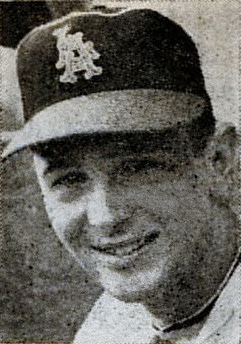
- Pitcher
- Born: February 21, 1942; Boston, Massachusetts, U.S.
- Died: June 24, 1987 (aged 45); Framingham, Massachusetts, U.S.
- Batted: Right Threw: Right

MLB debut
- September 16, 1962, for the Los Angeles Angels

Last MLB appearance
- August 5, 1967, for the California Angels

MLB statistics
- Win–loss record: 33–39
- Earned run average: 3.41
- Strikeouts: 254
- Stats at Baseball Reference

Teams
- Los Angeles/California Angels (1962–1967)

Frederick William Newman (February 21, 1942 – June 24, 1987) was an American professional baseball player, a right-handed pitcher who appeared in 108 games pitched, 93 as a starter, over six seasons (1962–1967) for the Los Angeles/California Angels.

The 6 ft 3 in (1.91 m), 180 lb (82 kg) Newman, a native of Boston, Massachusetts, was originally signed by the Red Sox as an amateur free agent after he graduated from neighboring Brookline High School in 1960. Newman spent that season at the Class D level in the New York–Penn League, winning only four of 14 decisions with an earned run average of 4.08, and the Red Sox left the 18-year-old off their protected list for the 1960 Major League Baseball expansion draft. The Angels then selected Newman with the 53rd overall pick.

In his third minor league season, with the Class C San Jose Bees in 1962, Newman compiled a 15–1 (.938) record, with a low 1.85 ERA. That led the Angels to promote him to Triple-A, then to their Major League roster that September. He worked in four late-season games, including his first big-league start. He spent the first half of 1963 in Triple-A before being called up to Los Angeles in July.

Newman then posted strong seasons in both 1964 and 1965, winning a total of 27 games, with his earned run average each season below the 3.00 mark. He made 64 starts, notched 17 complete games and four shutouts. But arm troubles in 1966 began his decline as a big-league pitcher. He worked in only 24 total games in 1966–67, winning only five contests, and after trying to work through his injuries in the minor leagues, he retired after the 1968 season.

In the Majors, Newman recorded 254 strikeouts and 154 bases on balls, allowing 589 hits, in 610 innings pitched. After leaving baseball, he returned to Brookline and became a firefighter.

Newman died in Framingham, Massachusetts, in 1987, after an automobile accident in nearby Holliston. He was 45.
