= Earl Averill Jr. =

American baseball player (1931–2015)

Earl D. Averill
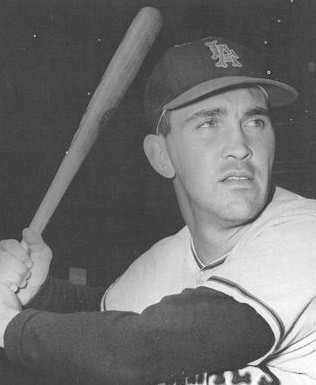
- Catcher
- Born: September 9, 1931; Cleveland, Ohio, U.S.
- Died: May 13, 2015 (aged 83); Tacoma, Washington, U.S.
- Batted: Right Threw: Right

MLB debut
- April 19, 1956, for the Cleveland Indians

Last MLB appearance
- September 26, 1963, for the Philadelphia Phillies

MLB statistics
- Batting average: .242
- Home runs: 44
- Runs batted in: 159
- Stats at Baseball Reference

Teams
- Cleveland Indians (1956, 1958); Chicago Cubs (1959–1960); Chicago White Sox (1960); Los Angeles Angels (1961–1962); Philadelphia Phillies (1963)

Earl Douglas Averill (September 9, 1931 – May 13, 2015) was an American professional baseball player who was a catcher and outfielder in the Major Leagues in 1956 and from 1958 to 1963 for the Cleveland Indians, Chicago Cubs, Chicago White Sox, Los Angeles Angels and Philadelphia Phillies. He was commonly called Earl Averill Jr. to distinguish him from his father, Howard Earl Averill, who was a Hall of Fame baseball player in his own right.

Averill was born in Cleveland, Ohio, where his father was a star for the Indians. The younger Averill threw and batted right-handed, stood 5 feet 10 inches (1.78 m) tall and weighed 185 pounds (84 kg). He played college baseball for the University of Oregon (UO) from 1951 to 1953, and while a sophomore had a .439 batting average. Averill was the UO's first All-American in baseball, and was named to the UO Hall of Fame in 1997.

He signed with the Cleveland Indians as a free agent after his college career ended, and began his professional career in 1953 with the Reading Indians, who he played with for two seasons. In 1955, he played for the Indianapolis Indians and Nashville Volunteers. He spent 22 games with Indianapolis in 1956 and had a .241 batting average, but was promoted to the main roster that year and made his Major League debut on April 19.

After playing in 42 games with the Indians in 1956, Averill spent 1957 and 1958 with the San Diego Padres, where he had his best seasons in the minors. In 1957, he had 19 home runs and 67 runs batted in in 119 games, and he followed that up in 1958 with a .347 batting average, 24 home runs, and 87 runs batted in 112 games and was named Pacific Coast League MVP. He was brought back up to the Indians for 17 games, then was traded to the Chicago Cubs with Morrie Martin for Jim Bolger and John Briggs. He spent a season and a half with the Cubs, then was traded to the Milwaukee Braves for Al Heist. After a month of not appearing in a game, he was traded to the White Sox and finished 1960 with them, only to be selected that December by the Los Angeles Angels in the 1960 Major League Baseball expansion draft.

Averill had his best season in 1961 with the Angels. In 115 games, he had a .266 batting average and 21 home runs. The following year, Averill set an MLB record that he shares with Piggy Ward. He had the most consecutive plate appearances reaching a base by any means with 17, which he did from June 3 to June 10, 1962. He ended that season with a .219 batting average in 92 games, then was traded to the Philadelphia Phillies for Jacke Davis. After 47 games with the Phillies, Averill was sent back to the minors, and spent two more seasons in the minor leagues before retiring.

In 449 games over seven seasons, Averill posted a .242 batting average (249-for-1031) with 137 runs, 41 doubles, 44 home runs, 159 RBI and 162 bases on balls. He did not hit any triples in his MLB career. Defensively, he recorded an overall .976 fielding percentage.

In 1980, Averill was a charter inductee to the Oregon Sports Hall of Fame.

He died on May 13, 2015.

In 2018, Averill was inducted into the Everett Community College Athletic Hall of Fame.

== See also ==
- List of second-generation Major League Baseball players
