= Jim Gentile =

American baseball player (born 1934)

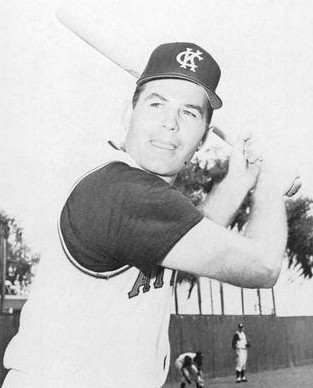
- First baseman
- Born: June 3, 1934 (age 92); San Francisco, California, U.S.
- Batted: Left Threw: Left

MLB debut
- September 10, 1957, for the Brooklyn Dodgers

Last MLB appearance
- September 3, 1966, for the Cleveland Indians

MLB statistics
- Batting average: .260
- Home runs: 179
- Runs batted in: 549
- Stats at Baseball Reference

Teams
- Brooklyn / Los Angeles Dodgers (1957–1958); Baltimore Orioles (1960–1963); Kansas City Athletics (1964–1965); Houston Astros (1965–1966); Cleveland Indians (1966); Kintetsu Buffaloes (1969)

Career highlights and awards
- 6× All-Star (1960–1962²); AL RBI leader (1961); Baltimore Orioles Hall of Fame

James Edward Gentile (born June 3, 1934), also nicknamed "Diamond Jim", is an American former professional baseball first baseman. He played in Major League Baseball (MLB) for the Brooklyn / Los Angeles Dodgers, Baltimore Orioles, Kansas City Athletics, Houston Astros, and Cleveland Indians between 1957 and 1966. He was an All-Star from 1960 to 1962, and third in American League MVP voting in 1961.

== Early life ==
Gentile was born on June 3, 1934, in San Francisco, California. He attended Sacred Heart Cathedral Preparatory School, graduating in 1952. He was both a top pitcher and hitter on its baseball team. The San Francisco Examiner selected him for its first team All-Star/All-City baseball teams in 1951 as a first baseman, and in 1952 as a pitcher. He was a starting pitcher in the 1952 East-West high school All-Star game in northern California. The Examiner selected him as the top left-handed pitcher during the 1946-53 high school seasons in the San Francisco area.

Gentile has been inducted into Sacred Heart's Athletic Hall of Fame. Sacred Heart produced other major league baseball players, such as Frank Bertaina, Joe Cronin (future Hall of Famer and American League president), Dolph Camilli, Harry Heilmann (Hall of Fame inductee), and Frank Zupo.

== Professional baseball career ==
Gentile was signed by the Brooklyn Dodgers in 1952, with a $30,000 signing bonus.

=== Dodgers organization ===
Gentile was a powerful, left-handed slugger listed at 6' 3", 210 lb. He was signed by the Brooklyn Dodgers as a high school pitcher in 1952. He played his first minor league season as a pitcher, earning a 2–6 win–loss record. The next year he was converted into a first baseman. He languished for eight years in the minors for a Dodgers team that already had All-Star Gil Hodges at first base and Norm Larker. He dominated the minors, leading two separate leagues in home runs; the 1953 Western League with 34, and the 1955 Southern Association with 28.

In 1956, playing for the Fort Worth Cats in the Double-A Texas League, Gentile had a .296 batting average, with 40 home runs, 115 runs batted in (RBI), 108 runs scored, 104 bases on balls, a .412 on-base percentage, and 1.003 OPS (on-base plus slugging). He was in the Texas League's top-three in home runs, runs batted in, walks and OPS. In 1957, for the Triple-A Montreal Royals, he hit .275, with 24 home runs, and 90 RBIs, and was in the International League's top-ten in home runs, RBIs and OPS.

During those same two years for the Dodgers, Gil Hodges hit .265, with 32 home runs and 87 RBIs (1956), and .299, with 27 home runs and 98 RBIs, and was named an all-star (1957). In those same two years, Larker hit .309 and .323 for the Triple-A St. Paul Saints, though with only 13 and 12 home runs; but it was Larker who became Hodges backup in 1958–59, not Gentile (hitting .277 and .289 respectively as a Dodger).

Gentile played for the Dodgers in only four games in 1957, 12 games in 1958, and no games in 1959. His first career major league at bat was pinch hitting for Sandy Koufax. His first start came against future hall of famer Robin Roberts. He had a down year for the Spokane Indians of the Pacific Coast League in 1958, but in 1959 he hit .288, with 27 home runs, 87 RBIs, and a .901 OPS for the St. Paul Saints of the Triple-A American Association.

On September 24, 1957, Gentile started at first base for the Dodgers at Brooklyn's famed Ebbets Field in the final game played there, then was replaced by Pee Wee Reese in the top of the fifth inning with Reese going to third base and Gil Hodges moving from third to first. The game's final batter, Pittsburgh's Dee Fondy, hit a ground ball to Don Zimmer at shortstop and Zimmer threw to Hodges at first base for the game's final out.

Dodgers hall of fame catcher Roy Campanella gave Gentile the nickname “Diamond Jim”, because he was a diamond in the rough. As of June 2024, he was one of only five people still living who had played for the Brooklyn Dodgers.

=== Baltimore Orioles ===
On October 19, 1959, the Dodgers traded Gentile to the Baltimore Orioles for $50,000 and two players to be named later (Willy Miranda and Bill Lajoie). The Orioles had been trying to trade for Gentile for years, but the Dodgers had asked too much in return. The Orioles had an option to send Gentile back to the Dodgers within the first thirty days of the 1960 season if he was not playing well. Although he had a poor spring training, Orioles manager Paul Richards decided to give Gentile 120 or 150 at bats to become the Orioles first baseman, if he could hit; and if not, Gentile would be sent back to the Dodgers on the 30th day. Gentile remembered that Campanella told him he had to be prepared when he got his shot, so he could be sure to take advantage, and that he should not give up.

On the season in 1960, Gentile played in 138 games for the Orioles, with 464 plate appearances and 384 at bats. He hit .292, with 21 home runs, 68 walks, 98 RBIs (5th best in the American League), and a .903 OPS (which would have ranked 5th if he had enough at bats). He was named to the both 1960 All-Star Games in his first full season, with a hit in the July 11, 1960 first game. He did not play in the July 13, 1960 second all-star game, though he was on the American League roster.

He enjoyed his best season in 1961, hitting career highs of .302 batting average, 46 home runs, 141 runs batted in (see below), 96 runs, 147 hits, 25 doubles, 96 walks, .423 on-base percentage, .646 slugging average and 1.069 OPS. He finished third in the MVP ballot (behind Mickey Mantle and Roger Maris). In addition, Gentile hit five grand slams — (including two straight in one game) — setting an American League record that stood until Don Mattingly belted six in 1987. He was again selected to play in both 1961 all-star games.

In 1962, Gentile hit 33 home runs, with 87 RBIs, 80 runs, a .251 batting average and .821 OPS. He was again named to play in both all star games, and was the starting first baseman in both games, on July 10, 1962, and July 30, 1962. In 1963, hit .248, with 24 home runs and 72 RBI. Gentile did not consider 1963 a good year, and believed he would be traded. In November 1963, the Orioles traded Gentile, along with $25,000, to the Kansas City Athletics for first baseman Norm Siebern.

Gentile was inducted into the Baltimore Orioles Hall of Fame in 1989.

=== Later career ===
He played a full season for the A's in 1964, hitting .251, with 28 home runs, 71 RBIs, 71 runs and 84 walks. He formed a power hitting duo with Rocky Colavito (34 home runs and 102 RBI), who also became a good friend, but unlike the up-and-coming Orioles the A's finished in last place. Early in the 1965 season, the A's traded Gentile to the Houston Astros for Jesse Hickman and a player to be named later (Ernie Fazio).

Between the A's and Astros he played in his fewest games since becoming a full-time major league player, and hit less than 20 home runs in a season for the first time as a major leaguer. In the middle of the 1966 season, the Astros traded him to the Cleveland Indians for Tony Curry. He had played part of 1966 for the Oklahoma City 89ers in the Pacific Coast League (PCL), the Astros Triple-A team. His major league playing time continued to fall, and he hit less than ten home runs total that year; his final year in the major leagues.

In a nine-season major league career, Gentile batted .260 (759-for-2,922) with 179 home runs, 549 RBI, 434 runs, 113 doubles, six triples, and three stolen bases in 936 games. He was particularly good with the bases loaded. In 86 plate appearances he hit .400 with a .453 on-base percentage, .729 OPS, and six grand slam home runs.

Gentile continued to play baseball after his major league career ended. In 1967–68, he played two seasons with the Philadelphia Phillies' PCL affiliate, the San Diego Padres. In his total 11 season minor league career, he hit 245 home runs, with 797 RBIs, a .272 average, 764 walks and an .888 OPS. He finished his professional baseball career playing one season in Japan for the Kintetsu Buffaloes in 1969, where, on opening day he ruptured his achilles tendon.

=== Manager ===
Gentile managed the Fort Worth Cats when they returned to baseball in 2001 and 2002. Gentile also managed the 2005 Mid-Missouri Mavericks of the Frontier League.

== 1961 RBI record keeping error ==
Gentile's 141 RBI in 1961 was second only to Roger Maris' 142 RBI, however, analysis by Retrosheet determined Maris was incorrectly credited with an RBI in a game on July 5, 1961. The run scored on an error by numerous accounts. Therefore, Gentile and Maris both had 141 RBI in 1961. It is commonly reported that Gentile's contract with the Orioles in 1961 called for a $5,000 bonus if he led the league in RBI, but Gentile's contract included no such bonus. Regardless, the Orioles presented Gentile with a check for $5,000 at a game in 2010.

== Personal life ==
Gentile now lives in Edmond, Oklahoma.

== See also ==
- List of Major League Baseball annual runs batted in leaders
