= Mike Lee (baseball) =

American baseball player (born 1941)

- Pitcher
- Born: May 19, 1941 (age 85); Bell, California, U.S.
- Batted: Left Threw: Left

MLB debut
- May 6, 1960, for the Cleveland Indians

Last MLB appearance
- September 22, 1963, for the Los Angeles Angels

MLB statistics
- Win–loss record: 1–1
- Earned run average: 3.34
- Strikeouts: 17
- Stats at Baseball Reference

Teams
- Cleveland Indians (1960); Los Angeles Angels (1963)

Michael Randall Lee (born May 19, 1941) is an American former professional baseball pitcher who appeared in 13 games in Major League Baseball (MLB) over two seasons for the Cleveland Indians (1960) and Los Angeles Angels (1963). He threw and batted left-handed, stood 6 feet 5 inches (1.96 m) tall and weighed 220 pounds (100 kg).

Lee attended East Los Angeles College and signed with the San Francisco Giants in 1959. After winning only seven of 26 decisions for Class B Fresno (with 160 strikeouts and 202 bases on balls in only 162 innings pitched), he was selected by Cleveland in the December 1959 first-year player draft. He then spent 1960 with the MLB Indians. Working in seven games, all in relief, he allowed only six hits and two earned runs in nine full innings pitched, with six strikeouts. However, he issued 11 bases on balls. In 1961, he began the year with the Indians' Class A Reading affiliate, but was traded to the St. Louis Cardinals' organization in June.

After only a year with Cardinal farm teams, however, Lee was released by the Redbirds in June 1963. He then signed with the Angels, returning him to his native Southern California. He was recalled from the minor leagues in August 1963 and made six appearances as an Angel, four as a starting pitcher. He earned his two MLB decisions in his first two outings as an Angel starter. On August 17, at Dodger Stadium, facing the Detroit Tigers (and their starter, eventual Baseball Hall of Famer Jim Bunning), he allowed only one run in his first three full innings, but faltered in the fourth, giving up a home run to Don Wert; he was charged with four runs allowed in 41/3 innings pitched and took the 6–1 loss. Thirteen days later, he went the mound against the Kansas City Athletics at Municipal Stadium. This time, he permitted only two runs and six hits in six full innings and departed for a pinch hitter with the Angels holding a 3–2 lead. The Angels went on to win, 6–2, giving Lee what would be his lone MLB victory. In his final big-league appearance on September 22, 1963, he started against his original team, the Indians, at Cleveland Stadium and registered his most effective start, working six innings and allowing only one run on six hits. He left the game for a pinch hitter with the game tied, 1–1; the Indians went on to win in extra innings.

Lee returned to the minor leagues in 1964 and was released by the Angels in June 1965, ending his professional career. In his 13 MLB games, he worked in 35 innings, allowing 36 hits and 25 bases on balls; he was credited with 35 strikeouts. He posted a 1–1 won–lost mark and a 3.34 career earned run average.
