= Norm Siebern =

American baseball player (1933–2015)

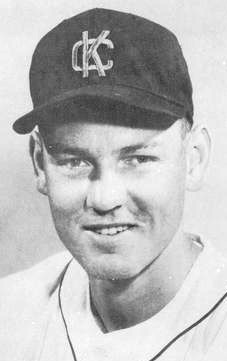
- First baseman / Left fielder
- Born: July 26, 1933; St. Louis, Missouri, U.S.
- Died: October 30, 2015 (aged 82); Naples, Florida, U.S.
- Batted: Left Threw: Right

MLB debut
- June 15, 1956, for the New York Yankees

Last MLB appearance
- July 30, 1968, for the Boston Red Sox

MLB statistics
- Batting average: .272
- Home runs: 132
- Runs batted in: 636
- Stats at Baseball Reference

Teams
- New York Yankees (1956, 1958–1959); Kansas City Athletics (1960–1963); Baltimore Orioles (1964–1965); California Angels (1966); San Francisco Giants (1967); Boston Red Sox (1967–1968)

Career highlights and awards
- 4× All-Star (1962–1964); 2× World Series champion (1956, 1958); Gold Glove Award (1958)

Norman Leroy Siebern (July 26, 1933 – October 30, 2015) was an American professional baseball player and scout. He appeared in 1,406 games over a 12-year career in Major League Baseball as a first baseman and left fielder for the New York Yankees, Kansas City Athletics, Baltimore Orioles, California Angels, San Francisco Giants and Boston Red Sox between 1956 and 1968. A two-time World Series champion and four-time American League All-Star, his best season came in 1962 with the Athletics when he hit 25 home runs, with 117 runs batted in and a .308 batting average. He might be most remembered, however, as being one of the players the Yankees traded for Roger Maris on December 11, 1959.

Siebern was born in St. Louis, where he graduated from Wellston High School. He attended Missouri State University (then known as Southwest Missouri State) and Washington University in St. Louis, and was signed by Yankees scout Lou Maguolo in 1951. Siebern batted left-handed, threw right-handed, and was listed as 6 feet 2 inches (1.88 m) tall and 200 pounds (91 kg).

== Baseball career ==
=== New York Yankees ===
Siebern's minor league career was interrupted by two full years (1954–1955) of military service. His first stint with the Yankees came two months into the 1956 season. Recalled from Triple-A Denver in June, Siebern appeared in 54 games, starting 39 in left field, second-most to Elston Howard's 50, but, hampered by injury, he hit only .204 with four home runs in 162 at bats. He appeared as a pinch hitter in Game 2 of the 1956 World Series, flying out against Don Bessent of the Brooklyn Dodgers in the sixth inning. The Yankees lost that game, 13–8, but went on to capture the Series in seven games, earning Siebern his first world championship ring. He spent all of 1957 in Denver, where he led the American Association in batting (.349), runs scored (124) and hits (191), and was named to the Association's All-Star team.

In 1958, Siebern made the major leagues for good. He became the Yankees' most-used left fielder, starting 118 games. At the plate, Siebern was one of the pennant-winning club's top offensive performers. He batted an even .300 and his 138 hits trailed only Mickey Mantle (158) and Tony Kubek (148) among his teammates. He also won his only career Gold Glove Award for his defensive prowess as an outfielder. However, the 1958 World Series would be a difficult one for Siebern. He started in left field for three of the Series' first four games against the Milwaukee Braves, including Games 3 and 4 at Yankee Stadium. With all World Series games then played in the afternoon, and home plate in autumnal shadows, left field was a notoriously treacherous position at Yankee Stadium: outfielders often were forced to track fly balls while staring into a blinding sun. According to The New York Times, "In Game 4 of the Series, with the Yankees down two games to one, Siebern lost a handful of fly balls in the sun or in the lights, which had been turned on to accommodate television. Although he wasn’t charged with an error, his misplays had a role in all three runs of a 3–0 Braves victory. Manager Casey Stengel benched him for the rest of the Series, which the Yankees came back to win."

The following season, 1959, saw the Yankees slump to third place in the American League, winning only 79 games overall. Siebern started only 82 games in left field and recorded 101 fewer plate appearances than he did in 1958. His production declined to a .271 batting mark, with 28 extra base hits, ten fewer than in 1958. On December 11, 1959, he became part of one of the most famous transactions in Yankees' annals. In a seven-player trade, he was dealt to the second-division Kansas City Athletics, along with veteran World Series heroes Don Larsen and Hank Bauer and future New York Mets legend Marv Throneberry, in exchange for 25-year-old outfielder Roger Maris and two others, first baseman Kent Hadley and shortstop Joe DeMaestri.

=== Kansas City Athletics ===
Siebern spent four seasons in Kansas City, averaging 153 games played, 162 hits, 54 extra-base hits, 92 runs batted in, and a .289 batting average. He hit 78 home runs in a Kansas City uniform, and was selected to three American League All-Star squads as a first baseman, where he moved permanently in June 1961.

In his finest offensive season, 1962, Siebern led the American League in games played (162) and finished second (behind Hall of Famer Harmon Killebrew) in runs batted in, third in on-base plus slugging percentage (OPS) (.907), and seventh in MVP balloting. He set personal bests in hits (185) and runs scored (114), in addition to home runs, batting average, and RBIs.

Overall, his hitting was one of the few bright spots for a Kansas City team that averaged 94 defeats each season from 1960 through 1963. On November 27, 1963, he was swapped to the Baltimore Orioles for their veteran first baseman, Jim Gentile, and cash.

=== Baltimore Orioles ===
Siebern moved into the lineup of the first-division and pennant-contending Orioles as their regular first baseman in 1964, starting in 138 of the club's 162 games and being selected to his final All-Star berth. But his offense suffered; he batted only .245 with only 12 home runs and 56 runs batted in during 596 plate appearances, although he led all American League batters in bases on balls received (106). Still, Baltimore won a team-record 97 games and finished only two games behind the Yankees in the pennant race. In 1965, Siebern began to split first-base duty with 23-year-old former Orioles' left fielder Boog Powell; he started 67 games and batted .256 with eight home runs.

=== Late MLB career ===
Siebern's final three MLB seasons were spent with three clubs: the Angels, San Francisco Giants and Boston Red Sox. In 1966, Siebern started 94 games for the Angels as their most-used first baseman. But his batting stroke did not return; he hit .247 with five home runs in 336 at bats in his only year in Anaheim. The off-season saw him traded again, to the Giants for journeyman outfielder Len Gabrielson. In limited service as a pinch hitter and first baseman in 1967, Siebern collected only nine hits in 58 at bats (.155) during his brief National League career. On July 15, the Giants sent him back to the American League, selling his contract to the Junior Circuit's surprise pennant contender, the "Impossible Dream" Red Sox.

Siebern was used almost exclusively as a pinch hitter for Boston (he got into only 14 innings in the field, ten at first base). But he provided a clutch, three-run triple on August 19 to help the Red Sox defeat the Angels, 12–11. After the Red Sox prevailed in the pennant race by one game, Siebern participated in his third and last World Series, the 1967 Fall Classic against the St. Louis Cardinals. In the seventh inning of Game 1, he pinch hit for Red Sox catcher Russ Gibson, but was left at home plate when Reggie Smith was caught stealing to end the frame. Staying in the game in right field, Siebern handled no fielding chances while stationed in Fenway Park's most notoriously hard-to-play outfield position, then came to the plate to lead off the Boston eighth inning against Hall of Famer Bob Gibson. Siebern singled to center field, then was replaced by pinch runner José Tartabull. He appeared in two other World Series games as a pinch hitter, going hitless to finish one for three (.333). The Cardinals defeated the Red Sox in seven games. Siebern remained with the Red Sox as a pinch hitter into the 1968 regular season, but he collected only two hits in 30 at bats and was released on August 7, 1968.

During his regular-season MLB career, Siebern hit .272 with 1,217 hits (including 206 doubles, 38 triples and 132 home runs). He knocked in 636 runs. Defensively, his career fielding percentage was .991. At first base his fielding percentage was .992 and as an outfielder was .984. He batted .167 (two for 12) in his three World Series. In All-Star play, he was hitless in two at bats as a pinch hitter. He scouted for the Atlanta Braves and Kansas City Royals after his playing career.

Siebern played basketball at Southwest Missouri State alongside his future New York and Kansas City baseball teammate Jerry Lumpe on a team that won two NAIA Championships in 1952 and 1953. Both players had to miss some tournament games to report to baseball spring training camp with the Yankees.
