= Lee Thomas (baseball) =

American baseball player and executive (1936–2022)

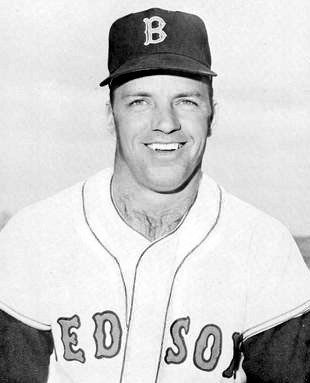
- First baseman / Right fielder
- Born: February 5, 1936; Peoria, Illinois, U.S.
- Died: August 31, 2022 (aged 86); St. Louis, Missouri, U.S.
- Batted: Left Threw: Right

Professional debut
- MLB: April 22, 1961, for the New York Yankees
- NPB: 1969, for the Nankai Hawks

Last appearance
- MLB: September 27, 1968, for the Houston Astros
- NPB: 1969, for the Nankai Hawks

MLB statistics
- Batting average: .255
- Home runs: 106
- Runs batted in: 428
- Stats at Baseball Reference

Teams
- New York Yankees (1961); Los Angeles Angels (1961–1964); Boston Red Sox (1964–1965); Atlanta Braves (1966); Chicago Cubs (1966–1967); Houston Astros (1968); Nankai Hawks (1969)

Career highlights and awards
- 2× All-Star (1962, 1962²)

James Leroy Thomas (February 5, 1936 – August 31, 2022) was an American first baseman and right fielder, coach and front-office executive in Major League Baseball (MLB) who played for six teams from 1961 to 1968, most notably the Los Angeles Angels, then went on to a successful tenure as general manager of the Philadelphia Phillies. Traded to the Angels one month after the expansion franchise began play in 1961, he tied for third in Rookie of the Year voting after batting .285 with 24 home runs and 70 runs batted in (RBI), primarily playing in the outfield. The following year, he was named to the American League (AL) All-Star team after shifting to first base, and appeared in both All-Star games played that year as a pinch hitter and late-inning defensive replacement. He finished the year with career highs in batting (.290), home runs (26) and RBI (104), but a sharp decline in 1963 led to his being traded to the Boston Red Sox in mid-1964, the first of four trades before the 1968 season.

After finishing his major league career with a .255 average, 106 home runs and 428 RBI, Thomas played for the Nankai Hawks of Nippon Professional Baseball in 1969. He played one more season in the minor leagues, then joined the St. Louis Cardinals as a coach for two years, followed by two years managing in the minors, before returning to the Cardinals organization to help them reach the World Series three times in the 1980s. Hired as the Phillies' general manager in 1988, he rebuilt the team's roster and assembled the team which advanced to the 1993 World Series; he served in the role until 1997 before spending another twenty years serving four teams as a scout and front-office executive.

== Playing career ==
Thomas was born in Peoria, Illinois, on February 5, 1936, and moved to St. Louis, Missouri, with his family as a child. He graduated from Beaumont High School in St. Louis in 1954, and was signed by New York Yankees scout Lou Maguolo. Thomas spent seven years in the minor leagues, putting up good offensive statistics in minor league baseball. He had two at bats for the Yankees in 1961 and garnered one hit, a pinch single off future Baseball Hall of Famer Hoyt Wilhelm, then with the Baltimore Orioles, on April 22 in his first MLB at bat.

On May 8, the Yankees traded Thomas, Ryne Duren, and Johnny James to the one-month-old Los Angeles Angels for Bob Cerv and Tex Clevenger. The trade began his five-year tenure as an everyday player: he appeared in 486 games for the Angels, and 258 more for the Boston Red Sox, who acquired him for outfielder Lou Clinton on June 4, 1964. From 1961 to 1965, Thomas topped the 20 home run mark three times, and drove in 104 runs batted in for the Angels in 1962. On September 5, 1961, Thomas collected nine hits in 11 at bats in a doubleheader against the Kansas City Athletics, hitting three home runs and driving in eight runs in the nightcap. He became one of eight players with nine hits in a doubleheader. He was selected to the 1962 American League All-Star team, and popped out as a pinch hitter in that year's first All-Star game, played at DC Stadium on July 10. In the year's second All-Star game, played July 30 at Wrigley Field, he appeared as a defensive replacement in left field for the game's final two innings and did not bat.

On December 15, 1965, the Red Sox traded Thomas, Arnold Earley, and a player to be named later (Jay Ritchie) to the Atlanta Braves for Dan Osinski and Bob Sadowski. Thomas was the starting first baseman in the first game in the Braves' Atlanta history, going hitless in five at bats on April 12, 1966, against the Pittsburgh Pirates at Atlanta Fulton County Stadium. Thomas held the starting job for the first full month of the season hitting .198 in 126 at bats. On May 28, 1966, the Braves traded him to the Chicago Cubs for Ted Abernathy. He then served as a part-time player and pinch hitter with the Cubs and Houston Astros, where he was dealt for two minor-league players on February 9, 1968, through the end of the 1968 campaign. He played in Nippon Professional Baseball for the Nankai Hawks in 1969. After he signed a minor league contract with the St. Louis Cardinals organization for the 1970 season, they assigned him to the Tulsa Oilers of the American Association, where he concluded his 17-year pro playing career at age 34.

In Major League Baseball, Thomas compiled a career batting average of .255 in 1,027 games played with 847 hits and 106 home runs.

== Front office career ==
In 1971, Thomas joined the MLB Cardinals as bullpen coach. In 1973, he became manager of the GCL Red Birds in the Rookie-level Gulf Coast League. Then, in 1974, Thomas moved up to Class A as skipper of the Modesto Reds of the California League. Thomas moved into the Cardinals' front office in 1975, becoming traveling secretary and rising to the position of director of player development in 1980. He was a key member of the St. Louis organization during the club's run of success during the early to mid-1980s when the Cards, led by manager Whitey Herzog, won NL pennants in 1982, 1985 and 1987 and the 1982 World Series.

In June 1988, the Philadelphia Phillies hired Thomas as their general manager. He acquired players such as Curt Schilling, John Kruk, Lenny Dykstra, Terry Mulholland, Mitch Williams, Tommy Greene, Pete Incaviglia and Jim Eisenreich, all of whom played critical roles on the Phillies' 1993 pennant-winning team, which lost the 1993 World Series to the Toronto Blue Jays. That same year, The Sporting News named him Executive of the Year for all of Major League Baseball.

When four straight losing seasons followed the 1993 pennant, Thomas was fired and replaced as general manager by Ed Wade, his assistant. He then returned to the Red Sox as a special assistant to Dan Duquette, Boston's general manager, in 1998. He played a key role in Boston's signing of free agent outfielders Manny Ramírez in December 2000 and Johnny Damon one year later. He served the Astros and the Milwaukee Brewers as a scout, and on December 4, 2011, he joined the Baltimore Orioles as a special assistant to Duquette, who was the executive vice president. He served in the role until the end of the 2018 season.

== Personal life and death ==
Thomas was married twice and had four children. He died at his home in St. Louis on August 31, 2022, at age 86.

== See also ==
- List of Philadelphia Phillies award winners and league leaders
- List of St. Louis Cardinals coaches

Sporting positions
Preceded by Woody Woodward	Philadelphia Phillies General Manager; 1988–1997	Succeeded by Ed Wade
Awards and achievements
Preceded by Dan Duquette	Sporting News Major League Baseball Executive of the Year; 1993	Succeeded by John Hart
