= Billy Moran =

American baseball player (1933–2021)

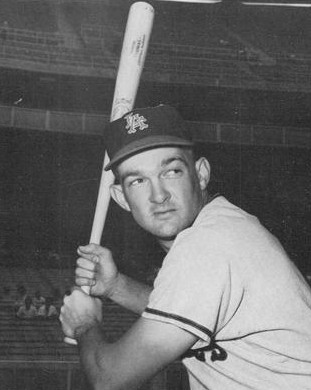
- Moran in 1964
- Second baseman
- Born: November 27, 1933; Montgomery, Alabama, U.S.
- Died: October 21, 2021 (aged 87); Rotonda West, Florida, U.S.
- Batted: Right Threw: Right

MLB debut
- April 15, 1958, for the Cleveland Indians

Last MLB appearance
- September 28, 1965, for the Cleveland Indians

MLB statistics
- Batting average: .263
- Home runs: 28
- Runs batted in: 202
- Stats at Baseball Reference

Teams
- Cleveland Indians (1958–1959); Los Angeles Angels (1961–1964); Cleveland Indians (1964–1965)

Career highlights and awards
- 2× All-Star (1962, 1962²)

William Nelson Moran (November 27, 1933 – October 21, 2021) was an American professional baseball player. Primarily a second baseman, he played in the Major Leagues from 1958–59 and 1961–65 for the Cleveland Indians and Los Angeles Angels. Moran threw and batted right-handed, stood 5 feet 11 inches (1.80 m) tall and weighed 185 pounds (84 kg).

Moran's professional career began in 1952 in the Cleveland farm system, and he missed the full seasons of 1955–56 while performing military service. He spent all of 1958 and part of 1959 with Cleveland, then was sold to the Triple-A Toronto Maple Leafs of the International League in 1960. The Angels acquired him from Toronto in the middle of their maiden American League season, 1961.

== Star of 1962 Angels ==
In 1962, Moran became the Angels' regular second baseman, starting 159 of the team's 162 games and posting career-best statistics as a batter, hitting .282 with 17 home runs and 74 runs batted in. He also led AL second basemen in putouts and was second in assists and third in fielding percentage. Moran was selected as the starting second baseman — ahead of eventual league Most Valuable Player runner-up Bobby Richardson — on the 1962 American League All-Star team. Moran started in both All-Star games that season, collecting two hits in seven at bats and playing errorless ball in the field. Meanwhile, the Angels stunned baseball by finishing third in the American League standings in the team's second season of existence.

In 1963, Moran again was a mainstay of the Angels' infield, starting 150 games and batting .275 with seven homers and 65 RBI. He led the AL's second basemen in putouts and assists, but made a league-leading 22 errors at second base. It was his last season as a regular player in MLB. The following season, Moran lost his job to rookie Bobby Knoop and in June he was sent back to the Indians in a three-team trade also involving the Minnesota Twins, and finished his MLB career as a utility infielder with Cleveland in 1964–65.

As a Major Leaguer, Moran appeared in 634 games played, with 2,076 at bats and 545 hits.
