= Don Lee (baseball) =

American baseball player (born 1934)

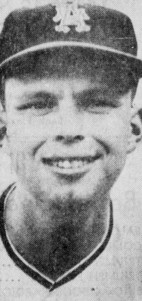
- Pitcher
- Born: February 26, 1934 (age 92); Globe, Arizona, U.S.
- Batted: Right Threw: Right

MLB debut
- April 23, 1957, for the Detroit Tigers

Last MLB appearance
- August 21, 1966, for the Chicago Cubs

MLB statistics
- Win–loss record: 40–44
- Earned run average: 3.61
- Strikeouts: 467
- Stats at Baseball Reference

Teams
- Detroit Tigers (1957–1958); Washington Senators / Minnesota Twins (1960–1962); Los Angeles Angels (1962–1965); Houston Astros (1965–1966); Chicago Cubs (1966)

Donald Edward Lee (born February 26, 1934) is an American former pitcher in Major League Baseball who played for the Detroit Tigers (1957–1958), Washington Senators / Minnesota Twins (1959–1962), Los Angeles Angels (1962–1965), Houston Astros (1965–1966) and Chicago Cubs (1966). Lee batted and threw right-handed. He is the son of former major league pitcher Thornton Lee.

Lee attended University of Arizona. Signed by the Tigers as an amateur free agent in 1956, he debuted in the 1957 season. After two years with the Tigers, he was sent to the Senators. In 1962 Lee went to the Angels. He finished his career with the Cubs in 1966. Lee was a journeyman pitcher who divided his playing time jumping between the rotation and the bullpen. His most productive season came in 1962 with Minnesota and the Angels, when he compiled career-highs in victories (11), strikeouts (102), shutouts (2) and innings pitched (205 1/3).

On September 2, 1960, Lee surrendered a home run to Ted Williams in the first game of a doubleheader between the Senators and Boston Red Sox. 21 years before, in his rookie season, Williams hit a home run off Don's father Thornton Lee, then with the Chicago White Sox, on September 17, 1939. With this feat, Williams became the only player in major league history to hit home runs against a father and son.

In a nine-season career, Lee posted a 40–44 record with 467 strikeouts, a 3.61 ERA, 11 saves, and 828 1/3 innings in 244 games played (97 as a starter).

== See also ==
- List of second-generation Major League Baseball players
