= Leon Wagner =

American baseball player (1934–2004)

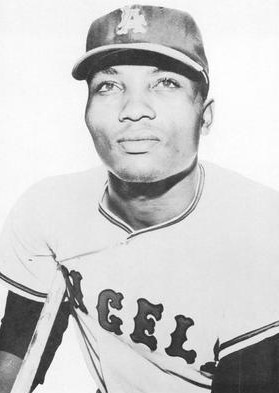
- Left fielder
- Born: May 13, 1934; Chattanooga, Tennessee, U.S.
- Died: January 3, 2004 (aged 69); Los Angeles, California, U.S.
- Batted: Left Threw: Right

MLB debut
- June 22, 1958, for the San Francisco Giants

Last MLB appearance
- October 2, 1969, for the San Francisco Giants

MLB statistics
- Batting average: .272
- Home runs: 211
- Runs batted in: 669
- Stats at Baseball Reference

Teams
- San Francisco Giants (1958–1959); St. Louis Cardinals (1960); Los Angeles Angels (1961–1963); Cleveland Indians (1964–1968); Chicago White Sox (1968); San Francisco Giants (1969)

Career highlights and awards
- 3× All-Star (1962–1963)

Leon Lamar Wagner (May 13, 1934 – January 3, 2004) was an American professional baseball left fielder who played Major League Baseball (MLB) for the San Francisco Giants (1958–1959, 1969), St. Louis Cardinals (1960), Los Angeles Angels (1961–1963), Cleveland Indians (1964–1968), and Chicago White Sox (1968). He batted left-handed and threw right-handed.

Born in Chattanooga, Tennessee, Wagner graduated from Tuskegee University. He was affectionately known as "Daddy Wags" during his playing days. This was due to his distinctive left-handed batting style and his notable and unique body gesticulations, primarily below the waist, before going into his devastating stride. His outfield play did not match his stellar hitting. He was at least briefly in the clothing business, advertising his venture as "Get your glad rags from "Daddy Wags". He was also known as "Cheeky" for his high cheekbones (being of half Native American and half African-American descent).

== Early life ==
Wagner was born on May 13, 1934, in Chattanooga, Tennessee to Eugene and Hattie Lee Wagner. His father found work near Detroit and the family moved to the area when Wagner was an infant. Wagner attended Inkster High School, where he starred in baseball, basketball and football, graduating in 1952. He went to college on a football scholarship at Tuskegee University (then called Tuskegee Institute). He left before graduating, returning to Michigan. He was half-Cherokee and half-African American.

== MLB career ==
=== New York/San Francisco Giants ===
Wagner originally signed with the New York Giants, and played in the Giants farm system from 1954 to 1956. He hit for power and a high batting average for three different minor league teams. In 1956, at Danville of the Carolina League, he hit 51 home runs with a .330 batting average in 152 games.

Wagner was drafted into military service after the 1956 season, and did not play professional baseball in 1957. He did play on an Army baseball team with future major league player, and teammate, Willie Kirkland, and future country singer Charley Pride. In 1958, he played 65 games with the Phoenix Giants of the Pacific Coast League, a Triple-A minor league, where he had 17 home runs and a .318 batting average when he was called up to play in the major leagues.

Wagner broke into the big leagues at age 24 for the San Francisco Giants in their first year in San Francisco, on June 22, 1958. A solid line-drive hitter and colorful player, he compiled a .317 batting average with 13 home runs in 74 games as a rookie. His fielding ability was not on the same level as his hitting ability, as he had five errors in the outfield, and his fielding was questioned by manager Bill Rigney. He had two double digit error seasons in the minor leagues. Competing for playing time against a congested Giant outfield that included Willie Mays, Felipe Alou, Jackie Brandt, and his Army teammate Willie Kirkland, among others (all of whom were superior fielders), he was traded to the Cardinals after the 1959 season, along with Daryl Spencer for Don Blasingame.

=== St. Louis Cardinals, Los Angeles Angels ===
Wagner was relegated to a reserve role for St. Louis in 39 games and hit four home runs. One home run was notable as being the first homer ever hit in Candlestick Park, on April 12, 1960, accounting for the lone Cardinal run in a 3–1 loss to his former team. During his time in St. Louis, manager Solly Hemus and coach Harry Walker worked improvement in Wagner's defense. He was traded to Toronto of the International League in October 1960, and then to the Los Angeles Angels for Lou Johnson in April 1961. He never played a game for Toronto.

Upon being traded to the American League (AL) expansion Angels in 1961 (their first season), Wagner found himself a regular for the first time. He took advantage of the opportunity, hitting .280, with 28 home runs and 79 RBIs (runs batted in), in 133 games. His most productive season came in 1962, when he blasted 37 home runs (tied for third highest in the AL), amassed 107 RBIs, 96 runs, 164 hits, and 21 doubles (all career highs), while batting .268. Wagner played in both All-Star Games that season (two All-Star Games were held each year from 1959 through 1962). In the second contest, he went 3-for-4, including a two-run home run. Wagner was voted the second All-Star Game's Most Valuable Player (MVP), and became the first AL player to receive the All-Star Game MVP Award that was first introduced that year, and for both games.

The first true slugger in Angel history, he hit 91 home runs with 276 RBIs in 442 games for them. His outfield play also showed improvement, with 12 assists, and he finished fourth in MVP voting. In 1963, he was an All-Star selection for a second time, but during the offseason was surprisingly sent to the Cleveland Indians in a trade that brought slugging first baseman Joe Adcock and pitcher Barry Latman to the Angels.

When Latman’s father-in-law heard about the trade, he said, “It’s impossible; is that all they got for Wagner?" Wagner was unhappy about the trade. He enjoyed playing and living in Los Angeles, and liked playing for manager Bill Rigney (who had earlier managed him with the Giants), and resented the Angels for trading him and never forgave them for trading him. Prior to the trade, he has once compared Angels general manager Fred Haney to Soviet Union leader Nikita Khrushchev.

=== Cleveland Indians, Chicago White Sox, Giants ===
As a Cleveland left fielder, Wagner hit 97 home runs from 1964 to 1967. His best year with the Indians was 1964, when he hit 31 homers, with 100 RBIs, and 94 runs. In 1965 he hit .294 with 28 homers. Wagner also stole 26 bases in 30 attempts in 1964–65. He was traded in June 1968 to the White Sox for Russ Snyder.

Wagner ended his career as a respected pinch-hitter, leading the AL in 1968 with 46 appearances in that role, while splitting the season between the Indians and the Chicago White Sox. Purchased by the Cincinnati Reds in December, 1968, he was returned to the White Sox on April 5, 1969, only to be released by them the same day. (Although his 1969 Topps baseball card depicted Wagner as a member of the Reds, he, in fact, never played a single regular-season game for them.)

Wagner then signed as a free agent with his first big league team, the Giants, playing in only 11 games. He made his final appearance on October 2, 1969, as the Giants hosted the expansion San Diego Padres. Although he had begun his MLB career with the Giants in 1958 and ended his career with them eleven seasons later, Wagner’s Giants games played total amounted to only 172 of his MLB career 1152-game total.

=== Career ===
Wagner, over the course of his 12-season MLB career, hit .272, with 211 home runs, and 669 RBIs, in 1352 games.

== Acting career ==
Following the end of his playing career, Wagner appeared in small acting roles, most prominently in John Cassavetes' 1974 film A Woman Under the Influence and as a member of a Depression-era barnstorming team in The Bingo Long Traveling All-Stars & Motor Kings (1976).

== Later life and death ==
Wagner's life after baseball was extremely difficult. In 1972, he and his wife were drawn into an ambush/robbery, when he was pistol-whipped and she was shot (both survived). In later years, he struggled with alcohol and drug issues, having had numerous financial difficulties after his baseball career ended. He was homeless for periods. Retired players Jim "Mudcat" Grant and Earl Wilson, who were involved with the Baseball Assistance Team, helping players who had fallen on hard times, tried to help Wagner, but with limited success. At the end of his life, Wagner lived in an abandoned electrical shed next to a dumpster in Los Angeles, which is where his lifeless body was found on January 3, 2004. The coroner ruled that Wagner had died of natural causes. However, as one writer said, "Yet, there was really nothing natural about the way that Wagner had died—or the way he had been living in his final years."
