= 1965 New York Yankees season =

Season for the Major League Baseball team the New York Yankees

1965 New York Yankees
- League: American League
- Ballpark: Yankee Stadium
- City: New York City
- Record: 77–86 (.472)
- League place: 6th
- Owners: CBS
- General managers: Ralph Houk
- Managers: Johnny Keane
- Television: WPIX (Red Barber, Phil Rizzuto, Jerry Coleman, Joe Garagiola)
- Radio: WCBS (AM) (Phil Rizzuto, Red Barber, Jerry Coleman, Joe Garagiola)

The 1965 New York Yankees season was the 63rd season for the franchise. The defending American League champions posted a disappointing 77–85 (.475) record, 25 games behind the Minnesota Twins, in sixth place. New York was managed by Johnny Keane, previously with the World Series champion St. Louis Cardinals.

This year was the beginning of a downturn for the Yankees that lasted nearly a decade, until a resurgence in the mid-1970s. It was the first season since 1925 that they failed to finish either above the .500 mark or in the first division. They finished last in 1966, their first time in the cellar since 1912.

Prior to the season in November 1964, CBS acquired eighty percent ownership of the Yankees for $11.2 million from co-owners Dan Topping and Del Webb, with an option to gain the remainder within five years. Four months later, Webb sold his ten percent of the club to CBS for $1.4 million; Topping held onto his ten percent until September 1966.

== Offseason ==
- October 21, 1964: Ralph Terry was sent by the Yankees to the Cleveland Indians to partially complete an earlier deal (the Yankees sent players to be named later and $75,000 to the Indians for Pedro Ramos) made on September 5, 1964. The Yankees sent Bud Daley to the Indians on November 27 to complete the trade.
- November 30, 1964: Ellie Rodríguez was drafted by the Yankees from the Kansas City Athletics in the 1964 first-year draft.
- November 30, 1964: Duke Carmel was drafted by the Yankees from the New York Mets in the 1964 rule 5 draft.
- Prior to 1965 season: Al Closter was signed by the Yankees as an amateur free agent.

=== First game in the Astrodome ===
- April 9, 1965: The Houston Colt .45s became the Houston Astros and inaugurated indoor baseball in the Astrodome with a 2–1 exhibition win over the Yankees. In this game, Mickey Mantle hit the first home run in the history of the Astrodome.

== Regular season ==
Bobby Murcer made his major league debut on September 8. He recorded his first hit on September 14, it was a two-run home run off Senators pitcher Jim Duckworth.

On October 3, Tony Kubek hit a home run in the last at-bat of his career.

=== Season standings ===
American League
Team	W	L	Pct.	GB	Home	Road
Minnesota Twins	102	60	.630	—	51‍–‍30	51‍–‍30
Chicago White Sox	95	67	.586	7	48‍–‍33	47‍–‍34
Baltimore Orioles	94	68	.580	8	46‍–‍33	48‍–‍35
Detroit Tigers	89	73	.549	13	47‍–‍34	42‍–‍39
Cleveland Indians	87	75	.537	15	52‍–‍30	35‍–‍45
New York Yankees	77	85	.475	25	40‍–‍43	37‍–‍42
Los Angeles / California Angels	75	87	.463	27	46‍–‍34	29‍–‍53
Washington Senators	70	92	.432	32	36‍–‍45	34‍–‍47
Boston Red Sox	62	100	.383	40	34‍–‍47	28‍–‍53
Kansas City Athletics	59	103	.364	43	33‍–‍48	26‍–‍55

=== Record vs. opponents ===
1965 American League record Sources:
Team	BAL	BOS	CWS	CLE	DET	KCA	LAA	MIN	NYY	WAS
Baltimore	—	11–7	9–9	10–8	11–7	11–7	13–5	8–10	13–5	8–10
Boston	7–11	—	4–14	8–10	6–12	11–7	5–13	1–17	9–9	11–7
Chicago	9–9	14–4	—	10–8	9–9	13–5	12–6	7–11	8–10	13–5
Cleveland	8–10	10–8	8–10	—	9–9	9–9	9–9	11–7	12–6	11–7
Detroit	7–11	12–6	9–9	9–9	—	13–5	10–8	8–10	10–8	11–7
Kansas City	7–11	7–11	5–13	9–9	5–13	—	5–13	8–10	7–11	6–12
Los Angeles / California	5–13	13–5	6–12	9–9	8–10	13–5	—	9–9	6–12	6–12
Minnesota	10–8	17–1	11–7	7–11	10–8	10–8	9–9	—	13–5	15–3
New York	5–13	9–9	10–8	6–12	8–10	11–7	12–6	5–13	—	11–7
Washington	10–8	7–11	5–13	7–11	7–11	12–6	12–6	3–15	7–11	—

NOTE: The Los Angeles Angels changed their name to California Angels on September 2, 1965, with the season in progress.

=== Notable transactions ===
- May 3, 1965: Johnny Blanchard and Rollie Sheldon were traded by the Yankees to the Kansas City Athletics for Doc Edwards.
- June 8, 1965: 1965 Major League Baseball draft
  - Bill Burbach was drafted by the Yankees in the 1st round (19th pick).
  - Tom Shopay was drafted by the Yankees in the 34th round.

=== Roster ===
1965 New York Yankees
Roster
Pitchers: 23 Rich Beck; 28 Gil Blanco; 56 Jim Bouton; 23 Jim Brenneman; 45 Jack Cullen; 24 Al Downing; 16 Whitey Ford; 39 Steve Hamilton; 29 Mike Jurewicz; 51 Pete Mikkelsen; 14 Pedro Ramos; 18 Hal Reniff; 45 Rollie Sheldon; 22 Bill Stafford; 30 Mel Stottlemyre; 29 Bobby Tiefenauer	Catchers: 38 Johnny Blanchard; 38 Doc Edwards; 41 Jake Gibbs; 32 Elston Howard; 47 Bob Schmidt; Infielders: 42 Ray Barker; 6 Clete Boyer; 27 Duke Carmel; 20 Horace Clarke; 10 Tony Kubek; 12 Phil Linz; 17 Bobby Murcer; 25 Joe Pepitone; 1 Bobby Richardson	Outfielders: 57 Art López; 11 Héctor López; 7 Mickey Mantle; 9 Roger Maris; 26 Archie Moore; 53 Ross Moschitto; 43 Roger Repoz; 15 Tom Tresh; 48 Roy White; Other batters: 42 Pedro González	Manager: 21 Johnny Keane; Coaches: 35 Vern Benson; 2 Frankie Crosetti; 31 Cot Deal (Pitching); 44 Jim Hegan; 55 Spud Murray

== Player stats ==
= Indicates team leader

=== Batting ===
==== Starters by position ====
Note: Pos = Position; G = Games played; AB = At bats; H = Hits; Avg. = Batting average; HR = Home runs; RBI = Runs batted in

Pos	Player	G	AB	H	Avg.	HR	RBI
C	Elston Howard	110	391	91	.233	9	45
1B	Joe Pepitone	143	531	131	.247	18	62
2B	Bobby Richardson	160	664	164	.247	6	47
3B	Clete Boyer	148	514	129	.251	18	58
SS	Tony Kubek	109	339	74	.218	5	35
LF	Mickey Mantle	122	361	92	.255	19	46
CF	Tom Tresh	156	602	168	.279	26	74
RF	Héctor López	111	283	74	.261	7	39

==== Other batters ====
Note: G = Games played; AB = At bats; H = Hits; Avg. = Batting average; HR = Home runs; RBI = Runs batted in

Player	G	AB	H	Avg.	HR	RBI
Phil Linz	99	285	59	.207	2	16
Roger Repoz	79	218	48	.220	12	28
Ray Barker	98	205	52	.254	7	31
Roger Maris	46	155	37	.239	8	27
Horace Clarke	51	108	28	.259	1	9
Doc Edwards	45	100	19	.190	1	9
Jake Gibbs	37	68	15	.221	2	7
Art López	38	49	7	.143	0	0
Roy White	14	42	14	.333	0	3
Bob Schmidt	20	40	10	.250	1	3
Bobby Murcer	11	37	9	.243	1	4
Johnny Blanchard	12	34	5	.147	1	3
Ross Moschitto	96	27	5	.185	1	3
Archie Moore	9	17	7	.412	1	4
Duke Carmel	6	8	0	.000	0	0
Pedro González	7	5	2	.400	0	0

=== Pitching ===
==== Starting pitchers ====
Note: G = Games pitched; IP = Innings pitched; W = Wins; L = Losses; ERA = Earned run average; SO = Strikeouts

Player	G	IP	W	L	ERA	SO
Mel Stottlemyre	37	291.0	20	9	2.63	155
Whitey Ford	37	244.1	16	13	3.24	162
Al Downing	35	212.0	12	14	3.40	179
Jim Bouton	30	151.1	4	15	4.82	97
Jack Cullen	12	59.0	3	4	3.05	25
Rich Beck	3	21.0	2	1	2.14	10

==== Other pitchers ====
Note: G = Games pitched; IP = Innings pitched; W = Wins; L = Losses; ERA = Earned run average; SO = Strikeouts

Player	G	IP	W	L	ERA	SO
Bill Stafford	22	111.1	3	8	3.56	71

==== Relief pitchers ====
Note: G = Games pitched; W = Wins; L = Losses; SV = Saves; ERA = Earned run average; SO = Strikeouts

Player	G	W	L	SV	ERA	SO
Pedro Ramos	65	5	5	19	2.92	68
Hal Reniff	51	3	4	3	3.80	74
Steve Hamilton	46	3	1	5	1.39	51
Pete Mikkelsen	41	4	9	0	3.28	69
Gil Blanco	17	1	1	0	3.98	14
Bobby Tiefenauer	10	1	1	2	3.54	15
Rollie Sheldon	3	0	0	0	1.42	7
Jim Brenneman	3	0	0	0	18.00	2
Mike Jurewicz	2	0	0	0	7.71	2

== Awards and honors ==
- Mickey Mantle, Hutch Award
- 1965 MLB All-Star Game
  - Elston Howard
  - Mickey Mantle
  - Joe Pepitone
  - Bobby Richardson
  - Mel Stottlemyre

== Farm system ==
Level	Team	League	Manager
AAA	Toledo Mud Hens	International League	Frank Verdi
AA	Columbus Confederate Yankees	Southern League	Loren Babe
A	Greensboro Yankees	Carolina League	Lamar North
A	Fort Lauderdale Yankees	Florida State League	Jack Reed
A	Binghamton Triplets	New York–Penn League	Gary Blaylock
Rookie	Johnson City Yankees	Appalachian League	Bob Bauer
Rookie	FRL Yankees	Florida Rookie League	Chuck Boone

LEAGUE CHAMPIONS: Columbus, Fort Lauderdale, Binghamton
