= 1967 Southern League season =

- League: Southern League
- Sport: Baseball
- Duration: April 17 – September 3
- Games: 140
- Teams: 6

Regular season
- League champions: Birmingham Athletics

SL seasons
- ← 1966 1968 →

The 1967 Southern League was a Class AA baseball season played between April 17 and September 3. Six teams played a 140-game schedule, with the top team winning the league pennant and championship.

The Birmingham Athletics won the Southern League championship, as they had the best record in the league.

== Team changes ==
- The Asheville Tourists left the league and joined the Carolina League.
- The Columbus Confederate Yankees disbanded.
- The Mobile A's relocated to Birmingham, Alabama and were renamed the Birmingham Athletics. The club remained affiliated with the Kansas City Athletics.
- The Macon Peaches ended their affiliation with the Philadelphia Phillies and began a new affiliation with the Pittsburgh Pirates.

== Teams ==
1967 Southern League
Team	City	MLB Affiliate	Stadium
Birmingham Athletics	Birmingham, Alabama	Kansas City Athletics	Rickwood Field
Charlotte Hornets	Charlotte, North Carolina	Minnesota Twins	Clark Griffith Park
Evansville White Sox	Evansville, Indiana	Chicago White Sox	Bosse Field
Knoxville Smokies	Knoxville, Tennessee	Cincinnati Reds	Smithson Stadium
Macon Peaches	Macon, Georgia	Pittsburgh Pirates	Luther Williams Field
Montgomery Rebels	Montgomery, Alabama	Detroit Tigers	Paterson Field

== Map of teams ==
Southern League teams

== Regular season ==
=== Summary ===
- The Birmingham Athletics finished the season with the best record in the league for the first time.

=== Standings ===
Southern League
Team	Win	Loss	%	GB
Birmingham Athletics	84	55	.604	–
Montgomery Rebels	80	58	.580	3.5
Evansville White Sox	76	63	.547	8
Charlotte Hornets	75	65	.536	9.5
Macon Peaches	55	85	.393	29.5
Knoxville Smokies	47	91	.341	36.5

== League Leaders ==
=== Batting leaders ===
Stat	Player	Total
AVG	Minnie Mendoza, Charlotte Hornets	.297
H	Minnie Mendoza, Charlotte Hornets	157
R	Reggie Jackson, Birmingham Athletics	84
2B	Gary Johnson, Evansville White Sox	29
3B	Reggie Jackson, Birmingham Athletics	17
HR	Graig Nettles, Charlotte Hornets	19
RBI	Barry Morgan, Montgomery Rebels	87
SB	Ángel Bravo, Evansville White Sox	24

=== Pitching leaders ===
Stat	Player	Total
W	Dick Drago, Montgomery Rebels	15
ERA	Garland Shifflett, Charlotte Hornets	1.45
CG	Dick Drago, Montgomery Rebels; Silvano Quezada, Macon Peaches	12
SHO	Dick Drago, Montgomery Rebels; Bob Reed, Montgomery Rebels; Scott Segar, Evansville White Sox	4
IP	Chuck Nieson, Charlotte Hornets	200.0
SO	Dick Drago, Montgomery Rebels	134

== See also ==
- 1967 Major League Baseball season
