= 1968 Southern League season =

- League: Southern League
- Sport: Baseball
- Duration: April 17 – September 2
- Games: 140
- Teams: 6

Regular season
- League champions: Asheville Tourists

SL seasons
- ← 1967 1969 →

The 1968 Southern League was a Class AA baseball season played between April 17 and September 2. Six teams played a 140-game schedule, with the top team winning the league pennant and championship.

The Asheville Tourists won the Southern League championship, as they had the best record in the league.

== Team changes ==
- The Knoxville Smokies disbanded.
- The Macon Peaches disbanded.
- The Asheville Tourists re-join the league after playing the 1967 season in the Carolina League. The Tourists played in the Southern League from 1964 to 1966. The club began an affiliation with the Cincinnati Reds.
- The Savannah Senators join the league as an expansion team. The club began an affiliation with the Washington Senators.

== Teams ==
1968 Southern League
Team	City	MLB Affiliate	Stadium
Asheville Tourists	Asheville, North Carolina	Cincinnati Reds	McCormick Field
Birmingham Athletics	Birmingham, Alabama	Oakland Athletics	Rickwood Field
Charlotte Hornets	Charlotte, North Carolina	Minnesota Twins	Clark Griffith Park
Evansville White Sox	Evansville, Indiana	Chicago White Sox	Bosse Field
Montgomery Rebels	Montgomery, Alabama	Detroit Tigers	Paterson Field
Savannah Senators	Savannah, Georgia	Washington Senators	Grayson Stadium

== Map of teams ==
Southern League teams

== Regular season ==
=== Summary ===
- The Asheville Tourists finished the season with the best record in the league for the first time.

=== Standings ===
Southern League
Team	Win	Loss	%	GB
Asheville Tourists	86	54	.614	–
Montgomery Rebels	80	57	.584	4.5
Charlotte Hornets	72	68	.514	14
Birmingham Athletics	66	74	.471	20
Savannah Senators	57	79	.419	23.5
Evansville White Sox	55	84	.396	30.5

== League Leaders ==
=== Batting leaders ===
Stat	Player	Total
AVG	David Burge, Asheville Tourists	.317
H	Minnie Mendoza, Charlotte Hornets	165
R	Paul Pavelko, Montgomery Rebels	93
2B	Minnie Mendoza, Charlotte Hornets	35
3B	Ossie Blanco, Evansville White Sox	14
HR	Wayne Redmond, Montgomery Rebels	26
RBI	Barry Morgan, Montgomery Rebels	91
SB	Allan Lewis, Birmingham Athletics	37

=== Pitching leaders ===
Stat	Player	Total
W	Grover Powell, Asheville Tourists	16
ERA	John Bauer, Evansville White Sox	1.64
CG	George Korince, Montgomery Rebels	11
SHO	Mickey Abarbanel, Evansville White Sox; Jimmie Brown, Montgomery Rebels; Ronnie Chandler, Montgomery Rebels; Rollie Fingers, Birmingham Athletics; Tom Hall, Charlotte Hornets; George Korince, Montgomery Rebels; Norm McRae, Montgomery Rebels	3
IP	Grover Powell, Asheville Tourists	188.0
SO	George Korince, Montgomery Rebels	146

== See also ==
- 1968 Major League Baseball season
