= 1970 Southern League season =

- League: Southern League
- Sport: Baseball
- Duration: April 16 – September 7
- Games: 140
- Teams: 8

Regular season
- League champions: Columbus Astros

SL seasons
- ← 1969 1971 →

The 1970 Southern League was a Class AA baseball season played between April 16 and September 7. Eight teams played a 140-game schedule, with the top team winning the league pennant and championship.

The Columbus Astros won the Southern League championship, as they had the best record in the league.

== Team changes ==
- The Jacksonville Suns join the league after last playing in the International League in 1968 before going on a hiatus for the 1969 season. The club begins affiliations with the Milwaukee Brewers and Montreal Expos.
- The Mobile A's rejoin the league after last playing in 1966 before going on hiatus from 1967 to 1969. The club begins an affiliation with the Chicago White Sox and are renamed to the Mobile White Sox.
- The Columbus White Sox ended their affiliation with the Chicago White Sox and began a new affiliation with the Houston Astros. The club was renamed to the Columbus Astros.
- The Savannah Senators ended their affiliations with the Houston Astros and Washington Senators and began a new affiliation with the Cleveland Indians. The club was renamed to the Savannah Indians.

== Teams ==
1970 Southern League
Team	City	MLB Affiliate	Stadium
Asheville Tourists	Asheville, North Carolina	Cincinnati Reds	McCormick Field
Birmingham Athletics	Birmingham, Alabama	Oakland Athletics	Rickwood Field
Charlotte Hornets	Charlotte, North Carolina	Minnesota Twins	Clark Griffith Park
Columbus Astros	Columbus, Georgia	Houston Astros	Golden Park
Jacksonville Suns	Jacksonville, Florida	Milwaukee Brewers; Montreal Expos	Wolfson Park
Mobile White Sox	Mobile, Alabama	Chicago White Sox	Hartwell Field
Montgomery Rebels	Montgomery, Alabama	Detroit Tigers	Paterson Field
Savannah Indians	Savannah, Georgia	Cleveland Indians	Grayson Stadium

== Map of teams ==
Southern League teams

== Regular season ==
=== Summary ===
- The Columbus Astros finished the season with the best record in the league for the first time.

=== Standings ===
Southern League
Team	Win	Loss	%	GB
Columbus Astros	78	59	.569	–
Montgomery Rebels	79	60	.568	–
Birmingham Athletics	73	65	.529	5.5
Savannah Indians	71	67	.514	7.5
Jacksonville Suns	67	70	.489	12
Charlotte Hornets	66	73	.475	13
Mobile White Sox	59	78	.431	19
Asheville Tourists	59	80	.424	20

== League Leaders ==
=== Batting leaders ===
Stat	Player	Total
AVG	Steve Brye, Charlotte Hornets	.308
H	Dan Monzon, Charlotte Hornets	149
R	Gomer Hodge, Savannah Indians; Frederick Smith, Savannah Indians	72
2B	Jim Clark, Birmingham Athletics; Bill Ferguson, Asheville Tourists	30
3B	Steve Brye, Charlotte Hornets; John Dolinsek, Columbus Astros	10
HR	James Covington, Jacksonville Suns	21
RBI	Jim Clark, Birmingham Athletics; Reggie Sanders, Birmingham Athletics	73
SB	Hagan Andersen, Montgomery Rebels	24

=== Pitching leaders ===
Stat	Player	Total
W	Ken Forsch, Columbus Astros; Bill Gilbreth, Montgomery Rebels	13
ERA	Eddie Smith, Mobile White Sox	1.83
CG	Buddy Harris, Columbus Astros	13
SHO	Ken Forsch, Columbus Astros	5
SV	Jack Whillock, Montgomery Rebels	12
IP	Bill Gilbreth, Montgomery Rebels	221.0
SO	Bill Gilbreth, Montgomery Rebels	192

== See also ==
- 1970 Major League Baseball season
