= 1966 Southern League season =

- League: Southern League
- Sport: Baseball
- Duration: April 21 – September 7
- Games: 140
- Teams: 8

Regular season
- League champions: Mobile A's

SL seasons
- ← 1965 1967 →

The 1966 Southern League was a Class AA baseball season played between April 21 and September 7. Eight teams played a 140-game schedule, with the top team winning the league pennant and championship.

The Mobile A's won the Southern League championship, as they had the best record in the league.

== Team changes ==
- The Birmingham Barons relocated to Mobile, Alabama and are renamed to the Mobile A's. The club continues their affiliation with the Kansas City Athletics.
- The Chattanooga Lookouts disbanded.
- The Lynchburg White Sox leave the league and join the Carolina League.
- The Evansville White Sox join the league as an expansion and begin an affiliation with the Chicago White Sox.
- The Macon Peaches join the league after taking a leave of absence for the 1965 season. The club begins an affiliation with the Philadelphia Phillies.

== Teams ==
1966 Southern League
Team	City	MLB Affiliate	Stadium
Asheville Tourists	Asheville, North Carolina	Pittsburgh Pirates	McCormick Field
Charlotte Hornets	Charlotte, North Carolina	Minnesota Twins	Clark Griffith Park
Columbus Confederate Yankees	Columbus, Georgia	New York Yankees	Golden Park
Evansville White Sox	Evansville, Indiana	Chicago White Sox	Bosse Field
Knoxville Smokies	Knoxville, Tennessee	Cincinnati Reds	Smithson Stadium
Macon Peaches	Macon, Georgia	Philadelphia Phillies	Luther Williams Field
Mobile A's	Mobile, Alabama	Kansas City Athletics	Hartwell Field
Montgomery Rebels	Montgomery, Alabama	Detroit Tigers	Paterson Field

== Map of teams ==
Southern League teams

== Regular season ==
=== Summary ===
- The Mobile A's finished the season with the best record in the league for the first time.

=== Standings ===
Southern League
Team	Win	Loss	%	GB
Mobile A's	88	52	.629	–
Asheville Tourists	78	61	.561	9.5
Evansville White Sox	68	72	.486	20
Macon Peaches	67	73	.479	21
Montgomery Rebels	66	72	.478	21
Charlotte Hornets	64	74	.464	23
Columbus Confederate Yankees	63	76	.453	24.5
Knoxville Smokies	61	75	.449	25

== League Leaders ==
=== Batting leaders ===
Stat	Player	Total
AVG	Johnnie Fenderson, Knoxville Smokies	.324
H	Sam Thompson, Knoxville Smokies	166
R	Sam Thompson, Knoxville Smokies	114
2B	Rich Barry, Macon Peaches	30
3B	Johnnie Fenderson, Knoxville Smokies	15
HR	Bob Robertson, Asheville Tourists	32
RBI	Bob Robertson, Asheville Tourists	99
SB	Sam Thompson, Knoxville Smokies	60

=== Pitching leaders ===
Stat	Player	Total
W	Bill Edgerton, Mobile A's	17
ERA	Robert Lasko, Columbus Confederate Yankees	1.71
CG	Dave Roberts, Asheville Tourists	14
SHO	Dave Roberts, Asheville Tourists	4
IP	Cisco Carlos, Evansville White Sox	199.0
SO	George Korince, Montgomery Rebels	183

== See also ==
- 1966 Major League Baseball season
