= 1965 Southern League season =

- League: Southern League
- Sport: Baseball
- Duration: April 16 – September 5
- Games: 140
- Teams: 8

Regular season
- League champions: Columbus Confederate Yankees

SL seasons
- ← 1964 1966 →

The 1965 Southern League was a Class AA baseball season played between April 16 and September 5. Eight teams played a 140-game schedule, with the top team winning the league pennant and championship.

The Columbus Confederate Yankees won the Southern League championship, as they had the best record in the league.

== Team changes ==
- The Macon Peaches disbanded.
- The Montgomery Rebels joined the Southern League after last playing in the Alabama-Florida League in 1962. The club affiliated with the Detroit Tigers.
- The Knoxville Smokies ended their affiliation with the Detroit Tigers and began a new affiliation with the Cincinnati Reds.

== Teams ==
1965 Southern League
| Team | City | MLB Affiliate | Stadium |
| Asheville Tourists | Asheville, North Carolina | Pittsburgh Pirates | McCormick Field |
| Birmingham Barons | Birmingham, Alabama | Kansas City Athletics | Rickwood Field |
| Charlotte Hornets | Charlotte, North Carolina | Minnesota Twins | Clark Griffith Park |
| Chattanooga Lookouts | Chattanooga, Tennessee | Philadelphia Phillies | Engel Stadium |
| Columbus Confederate Yankees | Columbus, Georgia | New York Yankees | Golden Park |
| Knoxville Smokies | Knoxville, Tennessee | Cincinnati Reds | Smithson Stadium |
| Lynchburg White Sox | Lynchburg, Virginia | Chicago White Sox | City Stadium |
| Montgomery Rebels | Montgomery, Alabama | Detroit Tigers | Paterson Field |

== Map of teams ==
Southern League teams

== Regular season ==
=== Summary ===
- The Columbus Confederate Yankees finished the season with the best record in the league for the first time.

=== Standings ===
Southern League
| Team | Win | Loss | % | GB |
|---|---|---|---|---|
| Columbus Confederate Yankees | 79 | 59 | .572 | – |
| Asheville Tourists | 80 | 60 | .571 | – |
| Lynchburg White Sox | 75 | 64 | .540 | 4.5 |
| Knoxville Smokies | 73 | 66 | .525 | 6.5 |
| Charlotte Hornets | 72 | 68 | .514 | 8 |
| Montgomery Rebels | 63 | 74 | .460 | 15.5 |
| Chattanooga Lookouts | 60 | 80 | .429 | 20 |
| Birmingham Barons | 54 | 85 | .388 | 25.5 |

== League Leaders ==
=== Batting leaders ===
| Stat | Player | Total |
|---|---|---|
| AVG | Gerald Reimer, Knoxville Smokies | .310 |
| H | Roy White, Columbus Confederate Yankees | 168 |
| R | Roy White, Columbus Confederate Yankees | 103 |
| 2B | Ron Clark, Charlotte Hornets | 27 |
| 3B | Roy White, Columbus Confederate Yankees | 14 |
| HR | Orlando McFarlane, Asheville Tourists | 22 |
| RBI | Charlie Leonard, Asheville Tourists | 78 |
| SB | Wayne Comer, Montgomery Rebels | 31 |

=== Pitching leaders ===
| Stat | Player | Total |
|---|---|---|
| W | Thomas Frondorf, Knoxville Smokies; Darrell Osteen, Knoxville Smokies | 16 |
| ERA | John Morris, Chattanooga Lookouts | 2.23 |
| CG | Fred Klages, Lynchburg White Sox | 15 |
| SHO | Thomas Frondorf, Knoxville Smokies | 4 |
| IP | Ted Sadowski, Charlotte Hornets | 202.0 |
| SO | Luke Walker, Asheville Tourists | 197 |

== See also ==
- 1965 Major League Baseball season
