= 1969 Southern League season =

- League: Southern League
- Sport: Baseball
- Duration: April 14 – August 31
- Games: 140
- Teams: 6

Regular season
- League champions: Charlotte Hornets

SL seasons
- ← 1968 1970 →

The 1969 Southern League was a Class AA baseball season played between April 14 and August 31. Six teams played a 140-game schedule, with the top team winning the league pennant and championship.

The Charlotte Hornets won the Southern League championship, as they had the best record in the league.

== Team changes ==
- The Evansville White Sox relocated to Columbus, Georgia and were renamed to the Columbus White Sox. The club remained affiliated with the Chicago White Sox.
- The Savannah Senators began a new affiliation with the Houston Astros. The club would also remain affiliated with the Washington Senators.

== Teams ==
1969 Southern League
Team	City	MLB Affiliate	Stadium
Asheville Tourists	Asheville, North Carolina	Cincinnati Reds	McCormick Field
Birmingham Athletics	Birmingham, Alabama	Oakland Athletics	Rickwood Field
Charlotte Hornets	Charlotte, North Carolina	Minnesota Twins	Clark Griffith Park
Columbus White Sox	Columbus, Georgia	Chicago White Sox	Golden Park
Montgomery Rebels	Montgomery, Alabama	Detroit Tigers	Paterson Field
Savannah Senators	Savannah, Georgia	Houston Astros; Washington Senators	Grayson Stadium

== Map of teams ==
Southern League teams

== Regular season ==
=== Summary ===
- The Charlotte Hornets finished the season with the best record in the league for the first time.

=== Standings ===
Southern League
Team	Win	Loss	%	GB
Charlotte Hornets	81	59	.579	–
Birmingham Athletics	78	62	.557	3
Asheville Tourists	69	69	.500	11
Columbus White Sox	65	75	.464	16
Montgomery Rebels	62	73	.459	16.5
Savannah Senators	59	76	.437	19.5

== League Leaders ==
=== Batting leaders ===
Stat	Player	Total
AVG	Donald Anderson, Asheville Tourists	.324
H	Gonzalo Márquez, Birmingham Athletics	159
R	Bobby Brooks, Birmingham Athletics	102
2B	Jake Wood, Montgomery Rebels	31
3B	Donald Anderson, Asheville Tourists	9
HR	Bobby Brooks, Birmingham Athletics	23
RBI	Donald Anderson, Asheville Tourists; Bobby Brooks, Birmingham Athletics	100
SB	Thomas Simon, Savannah Senators	24

=== Pitching leaders ===
Stat	Player	Total
W	Bill Zepp, Charlotte Hornets	15
ERA	LaDon Boyd, Birmhingham Athletics	2.19
CG	Jack Jenkins, Savannah Senators	13
SHO	LaDon Boyd, Birmhingham Athletics	5
SV	Bob Gebhard, Charlotte Hornets	19
IP	Paul Coleman, Montgomery Rebels	193.0
SO	Paul Coleman, Montgomery Rebels	153

== See also ==
- 1969 Major League Baseball season
