= 1964 Southern League season =

- League: Southern League
- Sport: Baseball
- Duration: April 17 – September 9
- Games: 140
- Teams: 8

Regular season
- League champions: Lynchburg White Sox

SL seasons
- 1965 →

The 1964 Southern League was a Class AA baseball season played between April 17 and September 9. Eight teams played a 140-game schedule, with the top team winning the league pennant and championship.

The Lynchburg White Sox won the Southern League championship, as they had the best record in the league.

== League changes ==
- After the South Atlantic League dissolved following the 1963 season, the league re-founded itself as the Southern League.
- The new league elected to start with a clean slate and not maintain records from the South Atlantic League.

== Team changes ==
- The Asheville Tourists joined the league from the South Atlantic League and was affiliated with the Pittsburgh Pirates.
- The Birmingham Barons joined the league after last playing in the Southern Association in 1961. The club began an affiliation with the Kansas City Athletics.
- The Charlotte Hornets joined the league from the South Atlantic League and was affiliated with the Minnesota Twins.
- The Chattanooga Lookouts joined the league from the South Atlantic League and was affiliated with the Philadelphia Phillies.
- The Columbus Confederate Yankees joined the league as an expansion team. The club began an affiliation with the New York Yankees.
- The Knoxville Smokies joined the league from the South Atlantic League and was affiliated with the Detroit Tigers.
- The Lynchburg White Sox joined the league from the South Atlantic League and was affiliated with the Chicago White Sox.
- The Macon Peaches joined the league from the South Atlantic League and was affiliated with the Cincinnati Reds.

== Teams ==
1964 Southern League
Team	City	MLB Affiliate	Stadium
Asheville Tourists	Asheville, North Carolina	Pittsburgh Pirates	McCormick Field
Birmingham Barons	Birmingham, Alabama	Kansas City Athletics	Rickwood Field
Charlotte Hornets	Charlotte, North Carolina	Minnesota Twins	Clark Griffith Park
Chattanooga Lookouts	Chattanooga, Tennessee	Philadelphia Phillies	Engel Stadium
Columbus Confederate Yankees	Columbus, Georgia	New York Yankees	Golden Park
Knoxville Smokies	Knoxville, Tennessee	Detroit Tigers	Smithson Stadium
Lynchburg White Sox	Lynchburg, Virginia	Chicago White Sox	City Stadium
Macon Peaches	Macon, Georgia	Cincinnati Reds	Luther Williams Field

== Map of teams ==
Southern League teams

== Regular season ==
=== Summary ===
- The Lynchburg White Sox finished the season with the best record in the league for the first time.

=== Standings ===
Southern League
Team	Win	Loss	%	GB
Lynchburg White Sox	81	59	.579	–
Birmingham Barons	80	60	.571	1
Macon Peaches	75	65	.536	6
Charlotte Hornets	73	67	.521	8
Knoxville Smokies	67	73	.479	14
Chattanooga Lookouts	65	74	.468	15.5
Columbus Confederate Yankees	65	74	.468	15.5
Asheville Tourists	52	86	.377	28

== League Leaders ==
=== Batting leaders ===
Stat	Player	Total
AVG	Len Boehmer, Macon Peaches	.329
H	Dick Kenworthy, Lynchburg White Sox	174
R	Dick Kenworthy, Lynchburg White Sox	99
2B	Len Boehmer, Macon Peaches	32
3B	Bert Campaneris, Birmingham Barons	11
HR	Dick Kenworthy, Lynchburg White Sox	29
RBI	Lee May, Macon Peaches	80
SB	George Spriggs, Asheville Tourists	33

=== Pitching leaders ===
Stat	Player	Total
W	Manly Johnston, Lynchburg White Sox	20
ERA	Dooley Womack, Columbus Confederate Yankees	2.32
CG	Manly Johnston, Lynchburg White Sox	15
SHO	Manly Johnston, Lynchburg White Sox	5
IP	Manly Johnston, Lynchburg White Sox	227.0
SO	David Galligan, Macon Peaches	168

== See also ==
- 1964 Major League Baseball season
