= 1911 Detroit Heralds season =

American football team season

- Head coach: Bill Marshall
- Home stadium: Mack Park

Results
- Record: 4–0–1

The 1911 Detroit Heralds season was the seventh season of independent American football played by the Detroit Heralds. The team was coached by Bill Marshall, compiled a 4–0–1 record, and won the Detroit football championship.

The team's lineup included Birtie Maher and R. Shields (ends), Polly La Grue (quarterback), Sylvester "Ole" Mauer and Schaffer (halfbacks), Lawrence Nedeau (fullback), and Hartledge (center).

During the 1911 season, Birtie Maher was an 18-year-old immigrant from Ireland; he played 10 seasons with the Heralds, remaining with the team until the 1920 season when they played in the National Football League.

Ole Mauer played with the Heralds starting in 1906. He was later remembered in a 1966 column by Joe Falls as "the first left halfback on the first professional football team to play in Detroit".

== Schedule ==
Date	Opponent	Site	Result	Attendance	Source
November 5	Hurons	Mack Park; Detroit	W 28–0	1,094	
November 12	Northwesterns	Mack Park; Detroit	W 22–0		
November 19	Spartans	Mack Park; Detroit	W 35–0		
November 26	Wolverines	Mack Park; Detroit	T 0–0	1,460	
December 3	Wolverines	Mack Park; Detroit	W 2–0		

== Players ==
The team's players included the following, those players with at least three starts shown in bold:

- **Beveridge** - started 4 games at guard, 1 game at tackle
- Fair - started 1 game at guard
- **Hartledge** - started 4 games at center
- **Jackel** - started 4 games at tackle, 1 game at guard
- **La Grue** - started all 5 games at quarterback; also team captain
- **Birtie Maher** - started all 5 games at right end
- **Mauer** - started all 5 games at left halfback
- McGuire - started 1 game at center
- **Nedeau** - started 4 games at fullback
- **Nichols** - started 3 games at tackle, 1 game at fullback
- **Schaffer** - started all 5 games at right halfback
- **G. Shields** - started 4 games at guard, 1 game at tackle
- **R. Shields** - started all 5 games at left end
- Sullivan - started 1 game at tackle
