= Joe Falls =

American journalist (1928–2004)

- Born: May 2, 1928
- Died: August 11, 2004 (aged 76); Detroit, Michigan, U.S.
- Occupation: Sportswriter
- Employer: Baseball America
- Awards: J. G. Taylor Spink Award

Joseph Francis Falls (May 2, 1928 – August 11, 2004) was an American journalist. He began his career in his native New York City. At the age of 17 in 1945, he took a job as a copyboy for the Associated Press. After an apprenticeship of eight years, Falls moved to the Detroit bureau of the AP.

In Detroit, Falls flourished. He was hired by the Detroit Times in 1956 to cover the Detroit Tigers. He continued on the Tigers' beat with the Detroit Free Press from 1960 to 1978. His final move was to the Detroit News where he was a columnist and eventually sports editor.

During his career, Falls also had weekly columns in both The Sporting News and The Hockey News. It is said many young writers were so taken by his writing they wanted to become sportswriters. He also kept a statistic on Rocky Colavito during his years as a member of the Detroit Tigers. When Colavito stranded a runner, Falls would give him an RNBI (Run Not Batted In). This infuriated Colavito and created a tense relationship between the two for several years.

Falls won several awards during his career. In 2001, he won the J. G. Taylor Spink Award from the Baseball Writers' Association of America. After his retirement in 2003, he was named to the Michigan Sports Hall of Fame.

Falls died of complications from diabetes and heart failure at age 76 in Detroit.

== Books ==
- "Man in Motion," Joe Falls (School-Tech Press, 1973)
- "Detroit Tigers," Joe Falls (Macmillan, 1975)
- "The Boston Marathon," Joe Falls (Collier Books, 1979)
- "So you think you're a die-hard Tiger fan," Joe Falls (Contemporary Books, 1986)
- "Daly Life: Every Step a Struggle: Memoirs of a World-Champion Coach," by Chuck Daly with Joe Falls (Masters Press, 1990)
- "The Detroit Tigers: An Illustrated History," Joe Falls (Random House Value Publishing, 1991)
- "Steve Yzerman: Heart of a Champion," Joe Falls, Francis J. Fitzgerald (AdCraft Sports Marketing, 1996)
- "A Legacy of Champions: The Story of the Men Who Built University of Michigan Football," Joe Falls, Bob Wojnowski, John U. Bacon, Angelique S. Chengelis, Francis J. Fitzgerald, Chris McCosky (CTC Productions & Sports, 1996)
- "Joe Falls: 50 years of sports writing: (and I still can't tell the difference between a slider and a curve)," Joe Falls (Sports Publishing LLC, 1997)
- "Greatest moments in Detroit Red Wings history," Joe Falls, Jerry Green, Vartan Kupelian (Masters Press, 1997)
- "So you love Tiger Stadium too (give it a hug)," Joe Falls, Irwin Cohen (Connection Graphics, 1999)

== Selected articles ==
- "Scribe Draws Up Gold Dust Team of Top Salaried Men," February 1950
- "For Prince Hal: A Painful Arm, Wonderful Memories" (Hal Newhouser), Associated Press, July 1953
- "Kid Bobo Wins 200th" (Bobo Newsom), Associated Press, September 1953
- "Believe Lions 'Greatest Team'" (1954 Detroit Lions), Associated Press, November 1954
- "Tigertown Wonder-City for Young Bowen: 19-Year-Old Catcher Finds Lakeland Farm Base an Exciting Place" (Jack Bowne), The Sporting News, March 20, 1957
- "Lary Lived It Up While Downing Yanks: First in 42 Years to Top N.Y. 7 Times; Detroit Moundsman Mystery in Mastery Over Champs; Other Clubs Clobber Him" (Frank Lary), The Sporting News, March 18, 1959
- "Two Boys from the Bronx: Reminiscing with Rocky Colavito" (Rocky Colavito), Baseball Digest, July 1960
- "Meet the New Kaline" (Al Kaline), Baseball Digest, April 1961
- "A Confident Young Tiger" (Steve Boros), Baseball Digest, May 1961
- "The Loneliest Man in the World," Baseball Digest, June 1961
- "Tigers Are Armed to the Teeth: Their outfield throwing is rated best in the game" (Al Kaline/Bill Bruton/Rocky Colavito), Baseball Digest, June 1961
- "Runs Eaten In: Chicken and dumplings sometimes mean hits," Baseball Digest, July 1961
- "Plane Talk: Players Liven Up 25,000 Miles," Baseball Digest, August 1961
- "Tigers' Business on a Cash Basis" (Norm Cash), Baseball Digest, August 1961
- "Spring Training Can Be Like This: It's sun, sand, sweat -- and peril," Baseball Digest, April 1962
- "Most Difficult Part of Managing: It's blasted part of changing pitchers" (Jimmy Dykes), Baseball Digest, May 1962
- "How About Orange Sweaters for Scorers?," Baseball Digest, March 1963
- "What Ten Years in the Majors Have Done to Kaline" (Al Kaline), Baseball Digest, June 1963
- "Polished Pro at 21" (Bill Freehan), Baseball Digest, July 1963
- "He's Getting the Williams Treatment" (Dick Stuart), Baseball Digest, March 1964
- "A Character Out of Character" (Charlie Dressen), Baseball Digest, May 1964
- "Alice in Tigerland" (Alice Sloane), Baseball Digest, May 1964
- "Horatio Horton: Tigers' prize rookie had Alger-like rise" (Willie Horton), Baseball Digest, June 1964
- "One Inning: 17 Runs!" (Steve Gromek), Baseball Digest, June 1964
- "A Most Forgettable Moment" (Paul Foytack), Baseball Digest, July 1964
- "Looie Is Queek In Head Too" (Luis Aparicio), Baseball Digest, August 1964
- "Stepped-On Hand Stepping Stone to Mound for Rakow" (Ed Rakow), Baseball Digest, September 1964
- "Game's Next Super Star?" (Bill Freehan), Baseball Digest, May 1965
- "He's Pitched 6,750 Home Run Balls" (Spud Murray), Baseball Digest, June 1965
- "The One Page in History That Revised Entire Book" (Johnny Sain), Baseball Digest, June 1965
- "The Wall That Defies All" (Green Monster), Baseball Digest, July 1965
- "Real Cleanup Men at the Plate: Vinegar and honey help Clete Boyer's bat" (Clete Boyer), Baseball Digest, September 1965
- "The Two Faces of Joe Peptitone: The Clown -- and the Pro" (Joe Pepitone), Baseball Digest, October 1965
- "Tilt a Foul Line, Signal from Center, But Cheat? Never!," Baseball Digest, October 1965
- "46 Years Later -- A Visit with Ed Cicotte" (Ed Cicotte), Baseball Digest, February 1966
- "Ump GETS This Decision: Ashford 'safe' as first Negro arbiter in majors" (Emmett Ashford), Baseball Digest, July 1966
- "Pitcher That Set Distance Records: Foytack threw world's longest homers, but was fun" (Paul Foytack), Baseball Digest, August 1966
- "Yastrzemski Still Ranks No. 1 in the AL" (Carl Yastrzemski), Baseball Digest, February 1969
- "Tiger Pitchers Were Patsies for Li'l Nel" (Nellie Fox), Baseball Digest, July 1969
- "Kaline, A Cinch To Be Elected to the Hall of Fame" (Nellie Fox), Baseball Digest, September 1970
- "Baseball's Greatest Clutch Hitter" (Mickey Mantle), Baseball Digest, August 1974
- "Remember Rip Sewell and the 'Ephus Ball'?" (Rip Sewell), Baseball Digest, July 1975
- "Hank Greenberg: The Upper Deck Was His Target" (Hank Greenberg), Baseball Digest, February 1977
- "What's It Like Inside Major League Dugouts," Baseball Digest, November 1978
- "The Story of Mickey Mantle's Famous Tape-Measure Homer," Baseball Digest, December 1978
- "Casey Stengel: He Was One of a Kind!" (Casey Stengel), Baseball Digest, December 1979
- "Here's a Memory Test for 'Old Time' Fans," Baseball Digest, February 1981
- "What If ...? Here's a Revised View of Baseball History," Baseball Digest, October 1981
- "Darrell Evans: The Making of a Home Run Hitter" (Darrell Evans), Baseball Digest, July 1986
- "'Characters' Have Always Brightened Baseball Scene," Baseball Digest, September 1986
- "Jack Morris Reflects on His Long, Varied Pitching Career" (Jack Morris), Baseball Digest, June 1994
- "Hall of Famer Jim Bunning Kept a 'Book' on Batters" (Jim Bunning), Baseball Digest, December 1996
- "Why I Like Baseball," Baseball Digest, November 2002
