= Columbus Confederate Yankees =

- 1964–1966; Columbus, Georgia

Minor league affiliations
- Class: Double-A (1964–1966)
- League: Southern League (1964–1966)

Major league affiliations
- Team: New York Yankees (1964–1966)

Minor league titles
- League titles (1): 1965

Team data
- Name: Columbus Confederate Yankees (1964–1966)
- Ballpark: Golden Park (1964–1966)

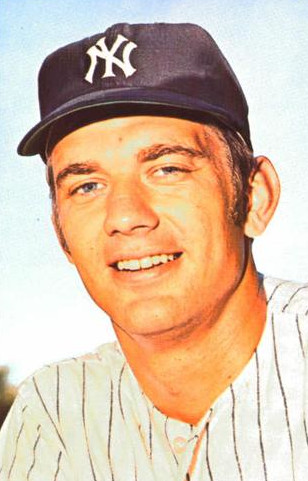
Stan Bahnsen (1965) won the 1968 American League Rookie of the Year Award.

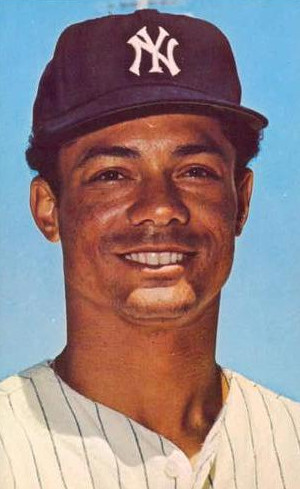
Roy White (1964–1965) was a two-time MLB All-Star and member of the 1977 and 1978 World Series champion New York Yankees.

The Columbus Confederate Yankees were a Minor League Baseball team that played in the Double-A Southern League from 1964 to 1966. They were located in Columbus, Georgia, and played their home games at Golden Park. Their seemingly contradictory nickname came from Georgia's former membership in the Confederacy and for their Major League Baseball affiliate, the New York Yankees, as it was common for Yankees affiliates to share the big league club's moniker.

Over three seasons of competition, Columbus played in 415 regular season games and compiled a win–loss record of 206–209. They won the Southern League championship in 1965.

== History ==
The Columbus Confederate Yankees were charter members of the Southern League, which began play in 1964. As the Double-A affiliate of the New York Yankees, they were managed by former major league catcher Rube Walker. The team finished its first year of play with a 64–74 record in seventh place.

The 1965 club was managed by Loren Babe, an ex-Yankee third baseman. On July 19, the Confederate Yankees hosted the 1965 Southern League All-Star Game. With 4,091 people in attendance at Golden Park, they defeated a team of the league's All-Stars, 4–3. Two members of the Columbus pitching staff threw no-hitters that season. The first occurred on June 30 when Mike Jurewicz no-hit the Charlotte Hornets in the second game of a seven-inning doubleheader. The second happened on August 13 when Rich Beck pitched seven no-hit innings against the Lynchburg White Sox. The 1965 SL pennant race was a close one: going into the final weekend, the Asheville Tourists led Columbus by a single game, with a three-game series set for Golden Park to determine the title. After splitting the first two games, Columbus won the finale, 7–0, with Rich Beck tossing a two-hit shutout, handing Columbus the Southern League pennant with a 79–59 first-place finish; technically, the Yankees were in a virtual first-place tie with Asheville, but the Tourists (80–60) played two more games, and thus had a lower winning percentage. The pennant-winning season meant that the Confederate Yankees were the league champions, as there was no postseason in the Southern League at that time. Babe would be named Southern League Manager of the Year.

In 1966, their final season of play, the Confederate Yankees were managed by Jack Reed, an outfielder with the 1961 World Series champion Yankees. They ended the season in seventh place at 63–76. During the off-season, the Southern League contracted from eight teams to six and Columbus left the circuit; they would return in 1969 as a White Sox affiliate.

== Season-by-season results ==
Season	Record	Win %	Finish	GB	Result	Ref.
1964	64–74	.468	7th	15 1/2	—	
1965	79–59	.572	1st	—	Won SL championship	
1966	63–76	.453	7th	24 1/2	—	
Totals	206–209	.496	—	—	—	—

== Players ==
Twenty-three Confederate Yankees also played in at least one game for a Major League Baseball (MLB) team during their careers. These players and their years with Columbus were:

- Stan Bahnsen (1965)
- Rich Barry (1964–1965)
- Rich Beck (1965)
- Bill Bethea (1965)
- Gil Blanco (1966)
- Jim Brenneman (1966)
- Tom Dukes (1964)
- Frank Fernández (1964–1965)
- Mike Ferraro (1965)
- Mike Hegan (1964–1965)
- Bill Henry (1966)
- Elvio Jiménez (1966)
- Mike Jurewicz (1965–1966)
- Jerry Kenney (1966)
- Dave McDonald (1966)
- John Miller (1965–1966)
- Cecil Perkins (1965–1966)
- Fritz Peterson (1965)
- Roger Repoz (1964)
- Ellie Rodríguez (1966)
- Steve Whitaker (1965–1966)
- Roy White (1964–1965)
- Dooley Womack (1964)

Preceded by Augusta Yankees	New York Yankees; Double-A affiliate 1964–1966	Succeeded by Binghamton Triplets
