= 1912 Detroit Heralds season =

American football team season

- Head coach: Bill Marshall
- Home stadium: Mack Park

Results
- Record: 4–2–1

The 1912 Detroit Heralds season was the eighth season of independent American football played by the Detroit Heralds. The team was coached by Bill Marshall, compiled a 4–2–1 record, and won the second annual Detroit football championship with victories over the Myrtles, Morrells, and Wolverines.

The team lost to the Ann Arbor Independents, a team led by John Maulbetsch who went on to play for Michigan from 1914 to 1916 and was selected as an All-American. In their only game against an out-of-state opponent, the Heralds played the Cleveland Erin Braus to a 7–7 tie. They also lost their only game with a college squad, the Adrian Bulldogs.

The team's lineup included Birtie Maher and R. Shields (ends), Polly La Grue (quarterback), Sylvester "Ole" Mauer and Schaffer (halfbacks), Lawrence Nedeau (fullback), and Moran (center).

== Schedule ==
Date	Opponent	Site	Result	Attendance	Source
October 20	Myrtles	Mack Park; Detroit	W 88–0		
October 27	Bay City Billikens	Mack Park; Detroit	W 80–0	1,650	
November 3	Morrells	Mack Park; Detroit	W 53–0	2,250	
November 10	Ann Arbor Independents	Mack Park; Detroit	L 0–12	2,490	
November 17	Wolverines	Mack Park; Detroit	W 6–0		
November 23	Adrian	Mack Park; Detroit	L 6–14		
November 24	Cleveland Erin Braus	Mack Park; Detroit	T 7–7		

== Players ==
The team's players included the following, those players with at least four starts shown in bold:

- **Beveridge** - started 4 games at guard
- Fair - started 2 games at tackle
- **Jueckle/Jackle** - started 5 games at tackle
- Jones - started 3 games at guard
- **La Grue** - started all 7 games at quarterback; also team captain
- **Birtie Maher** - started 6 games at end, 1 game at halfback
- Martz - started 2 games at guard
- **Mauer** - started 6 games at halfback, 1 game at fullback
- **Moran** - started all 7 games at center
- **Lawrence Nedeau** - started 6 games at fullback
- **Nichols** - started 5 games at tackle, 1 game at end
- **Schaffer** - started 6 games at halfback, 1 game at fullback
- **G. Shields** - started 5 games at guard, 2 games at tackle
- **R. "Dick" Shields** - started 6 games at end
- Sullivan - started 1 game at end
