= Binghamton Triplets =

- 1923–1968; Binghamton, New York; Games played in Johnson City, New York

Minor league affiliations
- Previous classes: Class AA (1967–1968); Class A (1964–1966); Class AA (1963); Class A (1933–1962); Class B (1923–1932)
- Previous leagues: Eastern League (1967–1968); New York–Penn League (1964–1966); Eastern League (1938–1963); New York–Penn League (1923–1937)

Major league affiliations
- Previous teams: New York Yankees (1965–1968); Milwaukee Braves (1964); Kansas City Athletics (1962–1963); New York Yankees (1932–1961)

Minor league titles
- League titles: 10 (1929, 1933, 1935, 1940, 1944, 1949, 1952, 1953, 1965, 1967)

Team data
- Previous parks: Johnson Field

The Binghamton Triplets were a minor league baseball team based in Binghamton, New York between 1923 and 1968. The franchise played as members of the New York–Penn League (1923–1937), Eastern League (1938–1963), New York–Penn League (1964–1966) and Eastern League (1967–1968). Binghamton was a minor league affiliate of the New York Yankees, Milwaukee Braves and Kansas City Athletics, winning ten league championships.

== History ==
Binghamton was affiliated with the New York Yankees from 1932 to 1961 and 1965 to 1968; the team also had brief affiliations with the Kansas City Athletics in 1962 and 1963 and the Milwaukee Braves in 1964. The Triplets played in the former New York–Pennsylvania League from 1923 to 1937, the Eastern League from 1938 to 1963 and 1967 to 1968, and the modern New York–Penn League from 1964 to 1966. They won league championships in 1929, 1933, 1935, 1940, 1944, 1949, 1952, 1953, 1965, and 1967. The Triplets moved to Manchester, New Hampshire after the 1968 season and became the Manchester Yankees, and the city was without a team until the Class AA Binghamton Mets began play in 1992.

The Triplets played their home games at Johnson Field in nearby Johnson City, New York until the team disbanded in 1968; the old ballpark was then torn down to help construct New York Route 17. The team wore caps with an intertwined 'T' and 'C' logo (similar to the original Minnesota Twins cap insignia); the letters stood for 'Triple Cities' (i.e., Binghamton, Johnson City, and Endicott). While the Triplets were a Yankee farm team, the parent club—featuring such legends as John Malangone, Babe Ruth, Lou Gehrig, Joe DiMaggio, and Mickey Mantle—played one exhibition game each year at Johnson Field.

== Community Owned ==
The Yankees bought the Triplets in 1932, but by 1961, after a decade in the red, the Yankees ended their association with the team. As a result, the baseball club became community owned operating as the farm team for the Kansas City Athletics’s. A Board of Directors was formed and appointed local Binghamton businessman Lou Rappaport as President, and former Business Manager of the Yankees, Jerry Toman as General Manager.

Rappaport and Toman led the effort of selling state approved stock certificates (which allowed fans to buy into the team) and made a deal with WNBF-TV to broadcast the games.

However, stock sales did not do as well as predicted and Kansas City withdrew from the Triplets in their third year. No other major league team signed on and the Triplets dropped from the Eastern League to the NY-P league, where they were picked up by the Milwaukee Braves for the 1964 Season, and remained with the Braves when they moved to Atlanta in 1965.

Ultimately, ticket sales continued to dwindle, radio rights were not longer being purchased, and Rappaport was putting in thousands of dollars of his own money to keep the team afloat, which was deep into the red. Not to mention the looming threat of the Johnson Field being torn down to make way for Express Highway 17.

But in 1966, to everyone's surprise, the Yankees came back elevating the team back to the Eastern League. Sadly, the city of Binghamton would not approve a new stadium and 1969 was the final year of The Triplets.

"Supporting a ball club is like marriage," Mr. Rappaport said. "It's for better or worse. You can't drop your wife off when you want to. You love her all the time.

== Notable alumni ==
=== Baseball Hall of Fame alumni ===
- Whitey Ford (1949) Inducted, 1974
- Lefty Gomez (1946-1947) Inducted, 1972
- Tony LaRussa (1962) Inducted, 2014

=== Notable alumni ===
- Gene Bearden (1945) 1948 AL ERA Title
- Tiny Bonham (1936) 2 x MLB All-Star
- Clete Boyer (1957)
- Garland Braxton (1946) 1928 AL ERA Title
- Max Butcher (1934)
- Bert Campaneris (1962) 6 x MLB All-Star
- Spud Chandler (1932-1933) 4 x MLB All-Star; 1943 AL Most Valuable Player
- Horace Clarke (1960)
- Atley Donald (1936)
- Al Downing (1961, 1968) MLB All-Star
- Jim Finigan (1950) 2 x MLB All-Star
- Freddie Fitzsimmons (1956)
- Hank Foiles (1949) MLB All-Star
- Cito Gaston (1964) MLB All-Star; Manager: 2 x World Series Champion Toronto Blue Jays (1992-1993)
- Bob Grim (1951) MLB All-Star; 1954 AL Rookie of the Year
- Heinie Groh (1931)
- Harry Gumbert (1932)
- Randy Gumpert (1940) MLB All-Star
- Pinky Hargrave (1937)
- Ken Harrelson (1962)
- Woodie Held (953)
- Tommy Holmes (1938) 2 x MLB All-Star
- Ralph Houk (1941) Manager: 2 x World Series Champion NY Yankees (1961-1962)
- Billy Johnson (1941) MLB All-Star
- Deron Johnson (1957)
- Bob Keegan 91946) MLB All-Star
- Ellis Kinder (1941)
- Lew Krausse (1962)
- Ted Kubiak (1962)
- Johnny Lindell (1937) MLB All-Star
- Dale Long (1950) MLB All-Star
- Mike Lum (1964)
- Jerry Lumpe (1953) MLB All-Star
- Pinky May (1934) MLB All-Star
- Clyde McCullough (1937) 2 x MLB All-Star
- John McNamara (1963) 1986 AL Manager of the Year
- George McQuinn (1932-1933) 7 x MLB All-Star
- Tom Morgan (1950)
- Thurman Munson (1968) Died Age 32; 7 x All-Star; 1970 AL Rookie of the Year; 1976 AL Most Valuable Player
- Fred Norman (1962)
- John O'Donoghue (1963) MLB All-Star
- Andy Pafko (1964) 5 x MLB All-Star
- Joe Pepitone (1960) 3 x MLB All-Star
- Mel Queen (1941)
- Vic Raschi (1946) 4 x MLB All-Star
- Bobby Richardson (1954) 1960 World Series Most Valuable Player
- Ellie Rodriguez (1967) 2 x MLB All-Star
- Buddy Rosar (1934) 5 x MLB All-Star
- Ken Sanders (1962)
- Eddie Sawyer (1942-1943)
- George Selkirk (1948-1950) 2 x MLB All-Star
- Bill Skowron (1951) 8 x MLB All-Star
- Moose Solters (1932)
- Bud Souchock (1941)
- Snuffy Stirnweiss (1955) 2 x MLB All-Star; 1945 AL Batting Title
- Russ Snyder (1955)
- Pete Suder (1938)
- Ralph Terry (1954) 2 x MLB All Star; 1962 World Series Most Valuable Player
- Lee Thomas (1956, 1959) 2 x MLB All-Star
- Marv Throneberry (1953)
- Jim Tobin (1933-1934) MLB All-Star
- Tom Tresh (1959) 3 x MLB All-Star; 1962 AL Rookie of the Year
- Gus Triandos (1950) 4 x MLB All-Star
- Bill Virdon (1952) 1956 NL Rookie of the Year
- Bill Wight (1942)

== Triplet players of note ==
- Whitey Ford: Yankee left-handed starter and member of the Baseball Hall of Fame.
- Thurman Munson: Yankee captain and all-star catcher, who played for the Triplets in their swansong 1968 season.
- Bobby Richardson: second baseman who won the 1960 World Series MVP (even though the Bronx Bombers lost the series).
- Joe Pepitone: Gold Glove-winning first baseman.
- Al Downing: On April 8, 1974, while pitching for the Los Angeles Dodgers, Downing yielded Hank Aaron's 715th home run.
- Clete Boyer: defensive standout third baseman, whose brothers (Ken and Cloyd) were also major leaguers.
- Marv Throneberry: 'Marvelous Marv' was a member of the infamous 1962 Mets.
- Ken Harrelson: longtime White Sox broadcaster, who hit 38 homers and drove in 138 runs for the Triplets in 1962, and who led the AL in RBIs in 1968 (with 109, as a member of the Red Sox).
- Vic Raschi: one the "Big Three" of the Yankees' pitching staff in the late 1940s and early 1950s.
- Tony La Russa: Baseball Hall of Fame manager who won the World Series in both leagues (with the Oakland Athletics and St. Louis Cardinals).
- Cito Gaston: manager of the Toronto Blue Jays during their two World Series victories (1992 and 1993).
- Bert Campaneris: All Star shortstop for Kansas City A's and Oakland A's, first MLB player to play all nine positions in one game September 8, 1965, led AL in steals 6 times, 1965–68, 1970 and 1972
- John McNamara: minor league catcher who went on to manage the Oakland A's, San Diego Padres, Cincinnati Reds, California Angels, Boston Red Sox, and Cleveland Indians winning AL Manager of the Year with Boston in 1986

== Triplet managers of MLB note ==
(Listed chronologically per tenure as Triplet manager.)

- Mike Konnick: Cincinnati Reds shortstop and catcher.
- Heinie Groh: Cincinnati Reds and New York Giants third baseman famed for his 'bottle bat.'
- Billy Meyer: known for his woes as Pittsburgh Pirates manager.
- Lefty Gomez: Yankee Hall-of-Fame southpaw hurler.
- George ‘Twinkletoes’ Selkirk: replaced Babe Ruth as starting Yankee right fielder.
- George ‘Snuffy’ Stirnweiss: slick-fielding Yankee second baseman.
- Freddie Fitzsimmons: New York Giants and Brooklyn Dodgers knuckleballer.
- Granny Hamner: shortstop for the 1950 Phillies 'Whiz Kids'.
- John McNamara: manager of the AL-pennant-winning 1986 Boston Red Sox.
- Andy Pafko: outfielder for the 1957 World Series champion Braves.
- Cloyd Boyer: St. Louis Cardinal pitcher, and brother of Clete and Ken.

Preceded by Columbus Confederate Yankees	New York Yankees; Double-A affiliate 1967–1968	Succeeded by Manchester Yankees
