= Lou Rappaport =

American entrepreneur (1902–1988)

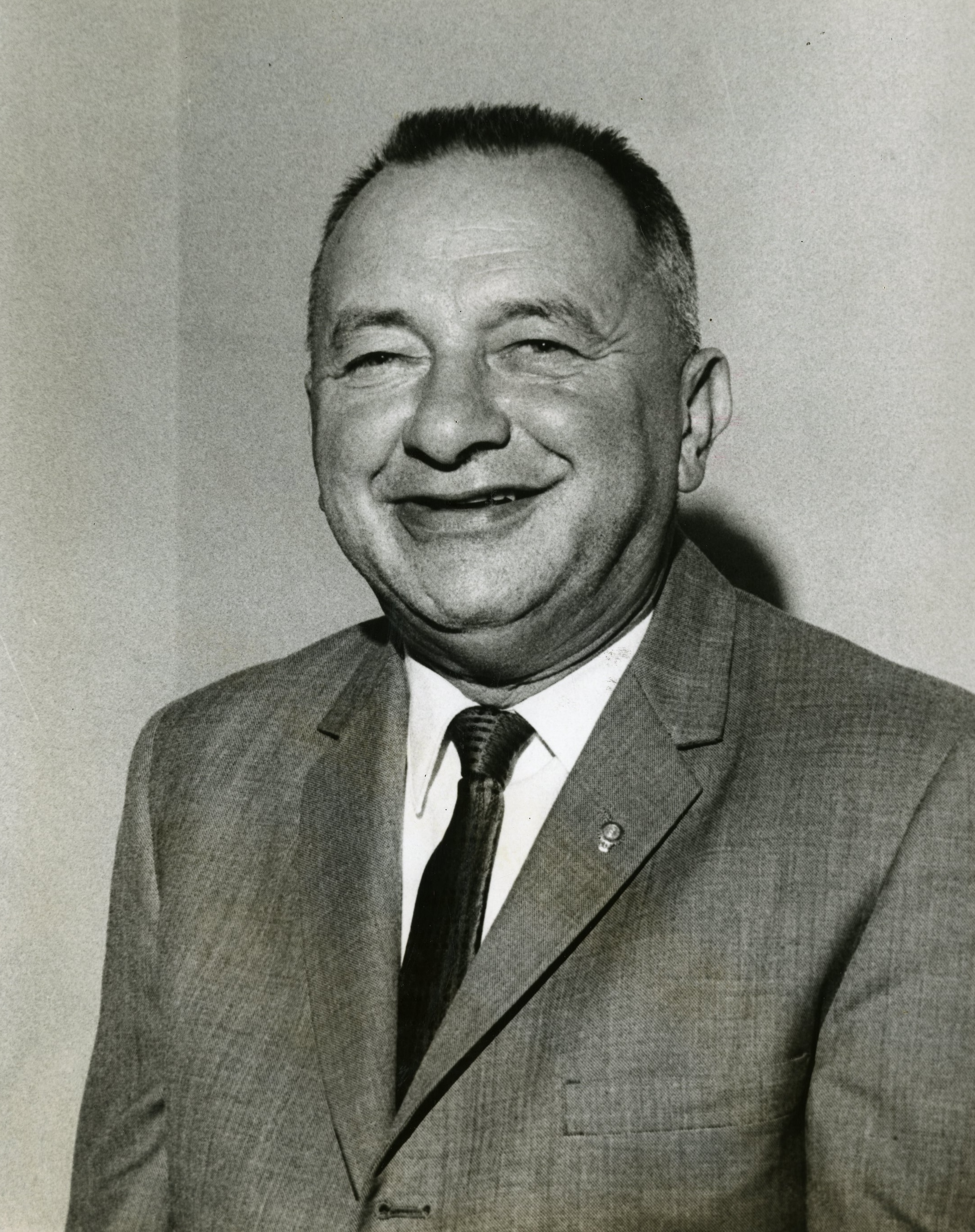
- Rappaport in 1975
- Born: October 2, 1902; Vilna, Russian Empire
- Died: January 4, 1988 (aged 85); Hollywood, Florida, U.S.
- Citizenship: American
- Occupation: Shopkeeper
- Known for: House of a Thousand Items; President of the Binghamton Triplets
- Spouse: Debra Leibowitz

Louis William Rappaport (October 2, 1902 – January 4, 1988) was an American shopkeeper in Binghamton, New York. From 1946 to 1971, he owned and operated Lou Rappaport's House of a Thousand Items. He also served as president of the Triple Cities Baseball Club, which managed the Binghamton Triplets minor-league team during the 1960s.

== Biography ==
=== Early life and career ===
Rappaport was born on October 2, 1902, in Vilna (now Vilnius, Lithuania), then part of the Russian Empire, to Henry Rappaport and Sarah Baile Katz. His father immigrated to New York City in 1905, and Lou and his mother followed in 1908 through Ellis Island, speaking only Yiddish at the time. The family settled in Binghamton by the late 1910s, joined by uncles Harry and Barnett. Lou's siblings Gertrude (born 1909), Irving (born 1912), and Jack (born 1915) were all raised in Binghamton.

The family first went into the poultry and meat business, in which Lou participated before beginning a long career in automobile sales. By 1926, he managed the accessory department at Bloom's Used Car Exchange, later serving as used-car manager for the New York Sales Co. Buick dealer. In 1934, he became manager of Triple Cities Chevrolet, a position he held until the company closed in 1938. He then independently bought and sold cars..

=== House of a Thousand Items ===
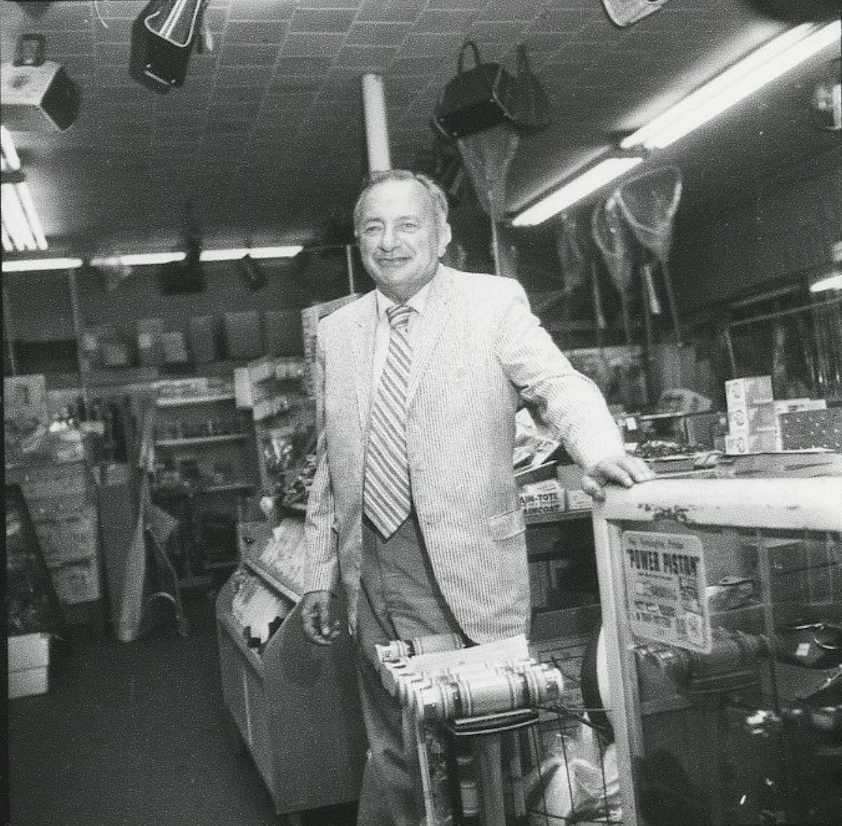
Lou Rappaport in his store

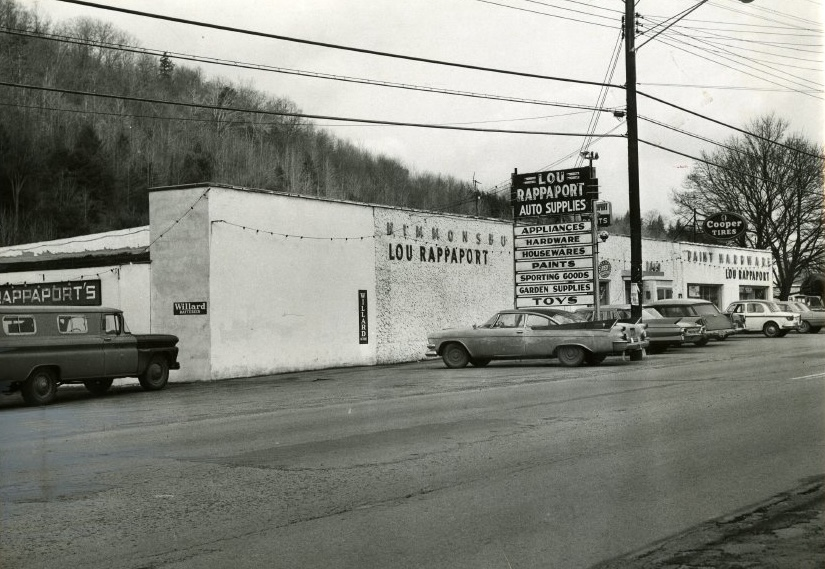
The store at 1149 Upper Front St.

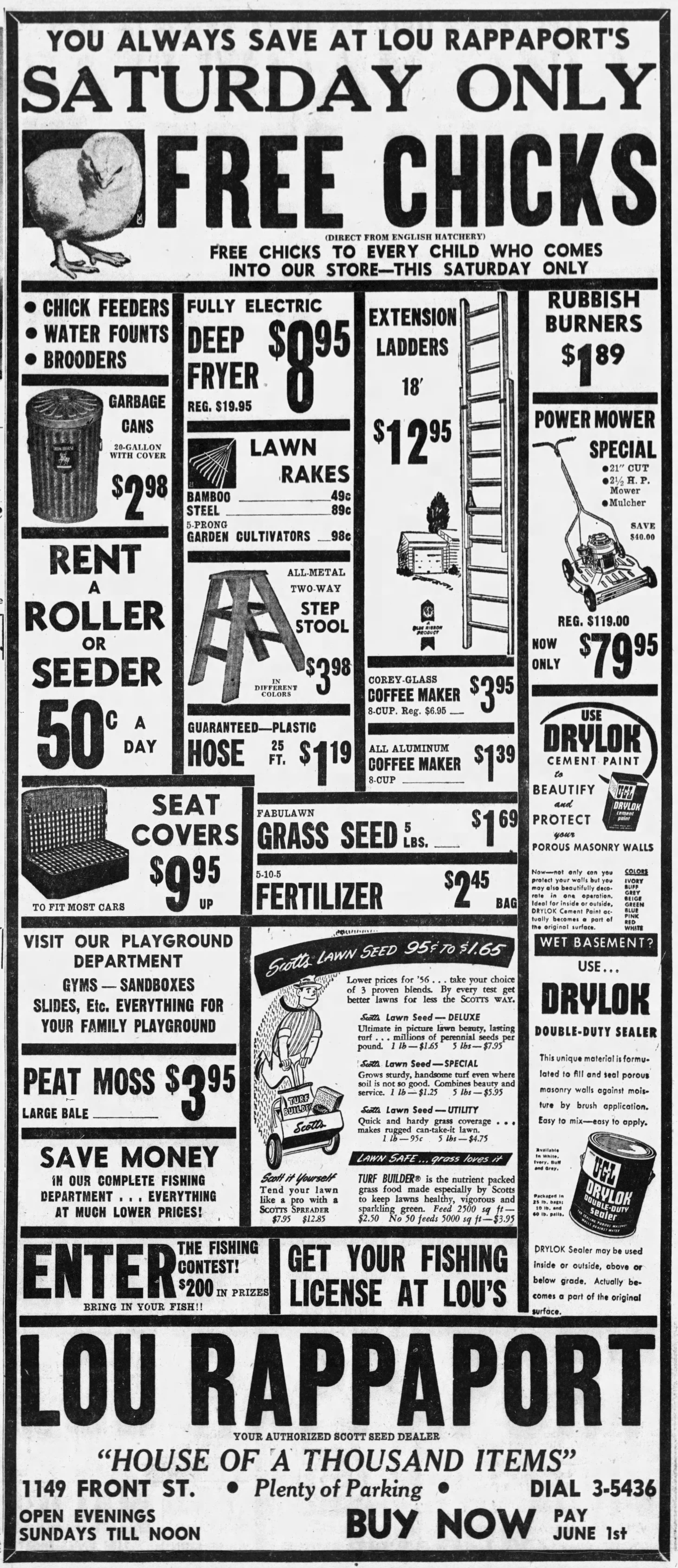

In 1946, shortly after the end of World War II, Rappaport opened his discount store with a simple newspaper ad offering 17 tires for sale. Demand was overwhelming. At first, he used his home attic and cellar for stock space and displayed merchandise in his front yard. He expanded rapidly by reinvesting profits and lengthening his hours.

The store was called "House of a Thousand Items". It sold hunting and fishing licenses, appliances, tires and auto parts, hardware, household supplies, sporting equipment, and toys. It also serviced lawn mowers.

To attract customers, Rappaport used promotions, including offering free baby chicks with certain purchases, which became a novelty in Binghamton.

In 1964, he acquired the neighboring restaurant for possible expansion.

Rappaport retired in 1971 and sold the business to Fran Olbrys. The store continued under other management until around 1990, when the building was divided for other uses.

=== Binghamton Triplets ===
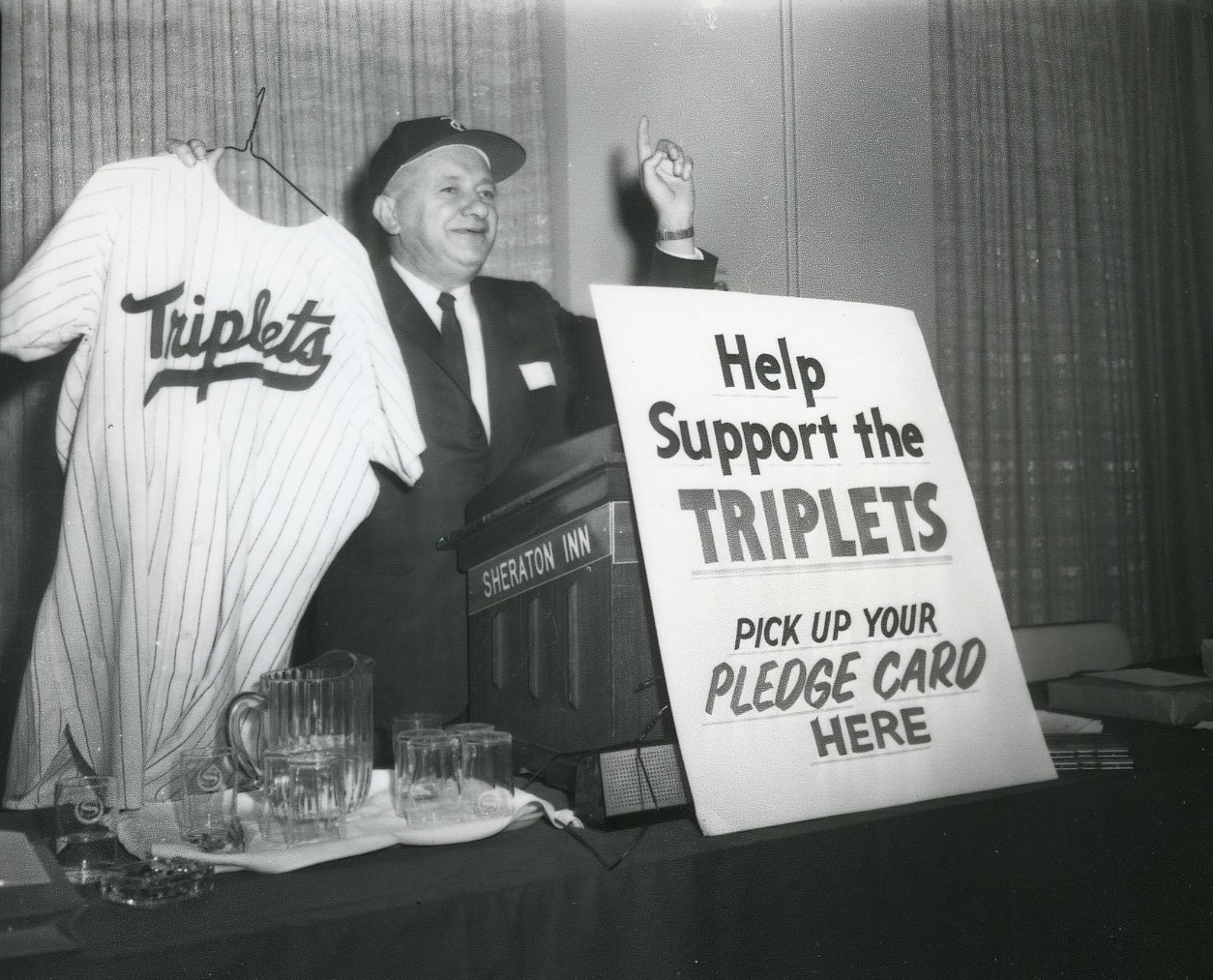
Lou Rappaport sells community stocks for the Binghamton Triplets

In the 1960s, Rappaport became president of the Triple Cities Baseball Club, which operated the Binghamton Triplets. The Triplets, representing Binghamton, Endicott, and Johnson City, had been the long-time Eastern League farm team of the New York Yankees. When the Yankees withdrew their affiliation in 1961, Rappaport organized a community stock sale to take over the club and was elected president.

Under his leadership, the Triplets initially affiliated with the Kansas City Athletics, though the partnership soon soured. Rappaport publicly criticized Kansas City executives for sending poor players. He later negotiated agreements with the Milwaukee/Atlanta Braves and briefly secured a return of the Yankees in 1966, which he considered a highlight of his baseball career.

Despite his efforts, the club struggled financially. Attendance declined, stock sales fell short of goals, and Rappaport often contributed personal funds to keep the team afloat. At the same time, the looming demolition of Johnson Field for the construction of New York State Route 17 left the club without a permanent home. Rappaport spearheaded multiple campaigns for a new stadium or multi-sport complex, arguing that baseball could pay for itself if given modern facilities. Political disagreements and lack of funding doomed these projects, and by 1969 the Triplets had folded.

In 1966, Rappaport chaired the groundbreaking committee for the new Jewish Community Center. Together, the couple embodied civic leadership in mid-century Binghamton, remembered both for their service to Jewish causes and for their public presence in business, sports, and community life.

== Personal life ==
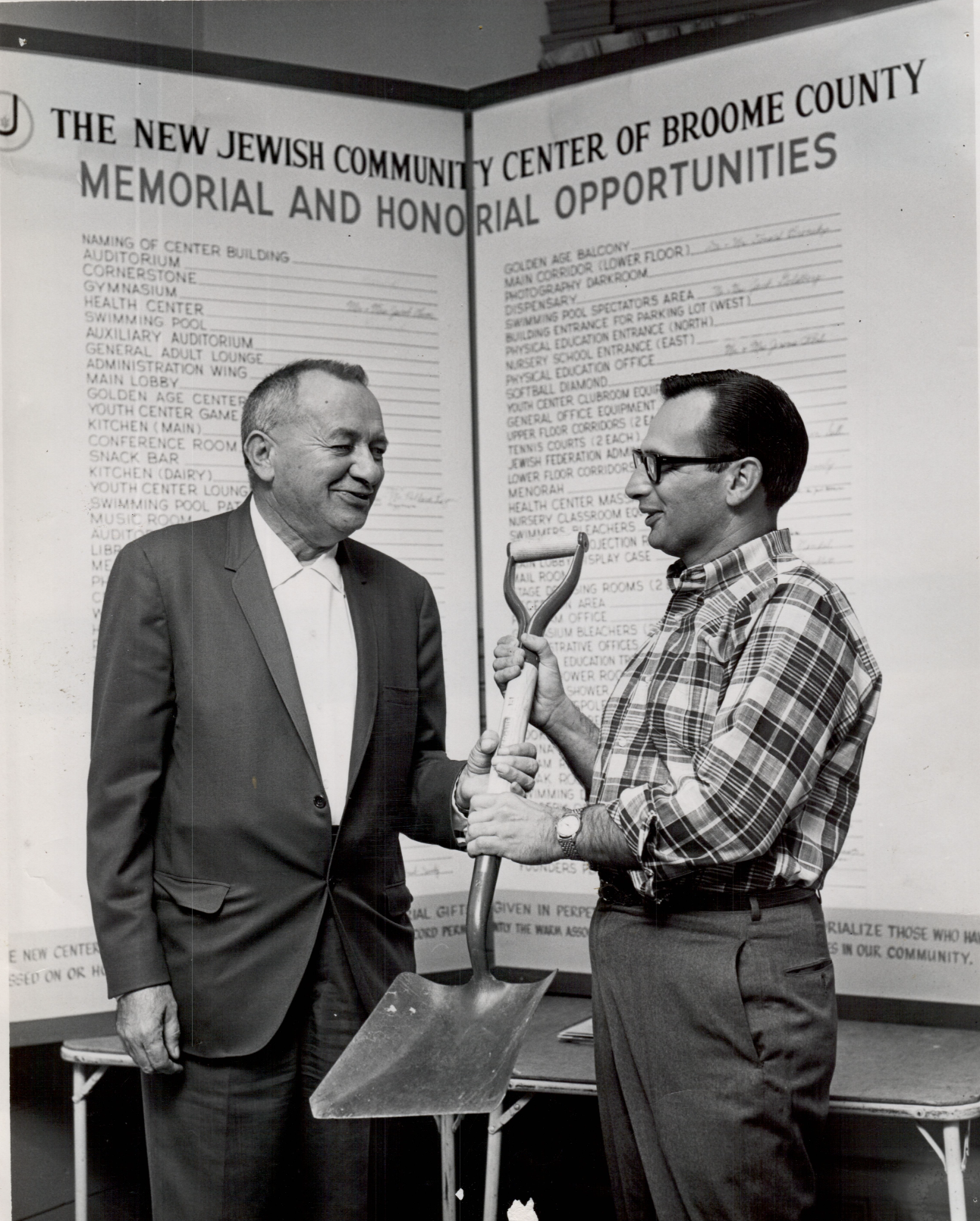
Ceremony to celebrate the groundbreaking of the Jewish Community Center in Binghamton, NY

In 1929, Rappaport became engaged to Debra Leibowitz. She was active in Hadassah for over a decade, serving on multiple committees and being elected president in 1944. She also served as president of the Vestal Hills Woman's Club, chaired the Women's Division of the Broome County Committee for the State of Israel, and, in 1960, she chaired the United Jewish Fund of Broome County. In 1969, she was honored with the Woman of Valor Award in recognition of her leadership and fundraising efforts for Israel Bonds. She was also an exceptional bridge player.

Lou Rappaport was also active in civic life as president of the Vestal Hills Country Club and a member of the Nimmonsburg Rotary Club.

Rappaport was involved in community fundraisers for the Jewish Community Center. In 1967, he was president of the local United Jewish Appeal.

During World War II, he served in the New York State Guard, while his wife Debra enlisted in the Women's Army Corps (WAAC) in 1942 and trained as a bookkeeper.

Rappaport retired in 1971 and moved to Hollywood, Florida, where he lived until his death on January 4, 1988.
