= Jim Clark (1970s outfielder) =

American baseball player (1947–2019)

- Outfielder
- Born: April 30, 1947; Kansas City, Kansas, U.S.
- Died: January 14, 2019 (aged 71); Mira Loma, California, U.S.
- Batted: Right Threw: Right

MLB debut
- July 16, 1971, for the Cleveland Indians

Last MLB appearance
- August 3, 1971, for the Cleveland Indians

MLB statistics
- Batting average: .167
- Home runs: 0
- Runs batted in: 0
- Stats at Baseball Reference

Teams
- Cleveland Indians (1971)

James Edward Clark (April 30, 1947 – January 14, 2019) was an American Major League Baseball outfielder who played for one season. He played for the Cleveland Indians from July 16, 1971, to August 3, 1971.
