= Gary Johnson (baseball manager) =

Baseball player and manager (1938–2012)

Gary George "Griz" Johnson (December 18, 1938 – December 22, 2012) was a longtime figure in professional baseball who, at various points, played, managed and scouted.

== Playing career ==
Prior to playing professionally, Johnson attended Huntington Beach High School and then Orange Coast College.

A first baseman, Johnson played in the minor leagues for 11 seasons, from 1958 to 1967. He began his career at 19 years old, hitting .282 with 49 hits in 50 games split between the Class-D Dubuque Packers and Class-D- Holdrege White Sox in 1958. In 1959, he played for the Clinton Pirates and hit .277 with five home runs in 115 games. He played for the Class-B Lincoln Chiefs in 1960 and hit .230 with one home run, 50 RBI and 13 stolen bases in 130 games.

He returned to Lincoln for 1961 and hit .289 with one home run and 122 hits in 110 games. He played for the unaffiliated Class-B Tri-City Braves in 1962, but was still part of the White Sox system. That season, he hit .341 with 178 hits, 35 doubles, 10 triples, 89 runs scored and 103 RBI in 135 games. He led the Northwest League in hits and RBI, tied Nelson Mathews for the lead in triples, placed second behind Ethan Blackaby in doubles and total bases and was third in at-bats. Back in the White Sox system in 1963, he hit .292 with eight home runs, 74 RBI and 15 stolen bases for the Double-A Lynchburg White Sox. He was second in the South Atlantic League in doubles, behind Mel Corbo.

He split 1964 between Lynchburg and the Triple-A Indianapolis Indians and hit .286 with 15 home runs, 102 RBI, 35 doubles and 10 triples in 159 games. The next year, again with Indianapolis, he hit .251 with ten home runs and 51 RBI in 142 games. In 1966, he played for the Double-A Evansville White Sox and Indianapolis and hit .273 with eight home runs and 70 RBI in 112 games and in 1967, he hit .280 with one home run and 58 RBI in 137 games for Evansville.

Overall, he hit .280 with 1,289 hits and at least 61 home runs in 1,228 games.

== Management and scouting career ==
In 1968, he began the season as the Appleton Foxes manager, but was replaced by Evansville White Sox manager Stan Wasiak in late July and took over for Wasiak in Evansville. He managed the Columbus White Sox in 1969.

He remained with the White Sox system for 25 more years, working as a scout and scouting director. In the early 1970s, along with Marty Keough he launched the Scout League of Southern California, where top high school players participated. He then joined the Texas Rangers system as a scout, where he remained for two seasons. He last worked for the Kansas City Royals for 27 seasons.

For the White Sox, he signed, among others, Francisco Barrios and Cecil Espy. He signed Jim Campbell, Shane Costa, Donnie Murphy, Ed Pierce, Bob Hamelin and Matt Treanor for the Royals.

== Recognition ==
He is a member of the Daily Pilot Sports Hall of Fame.
