= Bill Gilbreth =

American baseball player (1947–2020)

- Pitcher
- Born: September 3, 1947; Abilene, Texas, U.S.
- Died: July 12, 2020 (aged 72); Abilene
- Batted: Left Threw: Left

MLB debut
- June 25, 1971, for the Detroit Tigers

Last MLB appearance
- May 12, 1974, for the California Angels

MLB statistics
- Win–loss record: 2–1
- Earned run average: 6.69
- Strikeouts: 16
- Stats at Baseball Reference

Teams
- Detroit Tigers (1971–1972); California Angels (1974)

William Freeman Gilbreth (September 3, 1947 – July 12, 2020) was an American professional baseball pitcher who appeared in 14 games over three Major League Baseball (MLB) seasons for the 1971–1972 Detroit Tigers and 1974 California Angels. The left-hander, a native of Abilene, Texas, was listed as 6 feet (1.8 m) tall and 180 pounds (82 kg).

Gilbreth was selected by the Tigers in the third round of the 1969 June MLB draft after graduating from Abilene Christian University. He was recalled from the minor leagues in the midst of the 1971 season, and in his big-league debut — as Detroit's starting pitcher against the Cleveland Indians at Tiger Stadium on June 25 — he fired a complete game, 6–1 victory. Gilbreth allowed only five hits and struck out seven, collecting two singles in four at bats at the plate.

After a no-decision in his second start against the Boston Red Sox on July 1, Tiger manager Billy Martin gave Gilbreth his third starting opportunity on July 8 against Martin's old team, the New York Yankees. Gilbreth responded with another complete-game triumph, a 3–1 three-hitter. However, ten days later, in his fourth starting assignment, Gilbreth was roughed up by the Kansas City Royals, allowing four bases on balls, two hits (including a home run by Lou Piniella), and seven earned runs in only 1+ inning of work. He was charged with the 8–2 defeat, his final MLB decision.

Sent back to Triple-A after July 25 and two more appearances to work on his control, Gilbreth was recalled in September, earned another no-decision against Boston on September 9, when he could not hold a 3–1, second-inning lead, and was a relief pitcher for the remainder of his big-league tenure. A successful 1972 campaign at Triple-A, when he saved 14 games for Toledo, led to another call-up to Detroit, but he was ineffective. That September, Gilbreth was sent on waivers to the Angels. After missing the 1973 season, Gilbreth received an early-season trial from the 1974 Halos, but struggled in back-to-back appearances May 11–12 against Kansas City. He returned to Triple-A and retired at the close of the season.

In 14 big-league games pitched, including five starts, he posted a 2–1 won–lost mark and 6.69 earned run average, with two complete games. In 361/3 innings pitched, he permitted 40 hits and 26 bases on balls, with 16 strikeouts.

Returning to Abilene, Gilbreth eventually helped his alma mater revive its dormant varsity baseball program as Abilene Christian University's head coach from 1991–1995 and was elected to the school's athletics hall of fame in 1999.

Bill Gilbreth died in his hometown on July 12, 2020, from complications following heart surgery.
