= Ross Moschitto =

American baseball player (born 1945)

- Outfielder
- Born: February 15, 1945 (age 81); Fresno, California
- Batted: Right Threw: Right

MLB debut
- April 15, 1965, for the New York Yankees

Last MLB appearance
- September 25, 1967, for the New York Yankees

MLB statistics
- Batting average: .167
- Home runs: 1
- Runs batted in: 3
- Stats at Baseball Reference

Teams
- New York Yankees (1965, 1967)

Rosaire Allen Moschitto (born February 15, 1945) is a former Major League Baseball player. Moschitto played for the New York Yankees in 1965 and 1967. He batted and threw right-handed.

He was signed by the Yankees as an amateur free agent in 1964. Moschitto is only one of seven players to have more career game appearances than plate appearances.
