= Rich Beck =

American baseball player (born 1940)

- Pitcher
- Born: January 21, 1940 (age 86); Pasco, Washington, U.S.
- Batted: Both Threw: Right

MLB debut
- September 14, 1965, for the New York Yankees

Last MLB appearance
- September 28, 1965, for the New York Yankees

MLB statistics
- Win–loss record: 2–1
- Earned run average: 2.14
- Strikeouts: 10
- Stats at Baseball Reference

Teams
- New York Yankees (1965)

Richard Henry Beck (born January 21, 1940) is an American former Major League Baseball pitcher. Beck played for the New York Yankees in the 1965 baseball season.

Beck was signed by the Yankees as an amateur free agent in 1962 from Gonzaga University, where he played college baseball for the Bulldogs from 1961 to 1962.
