= Jim Brenneman =

American baseball player (1941-1994)

- Pitcher
- Born: February 13, 1941; San Diego, California, U.S.
- Died: March 10, 1994 (aged 53); Pearl, Mississippi, U.S.
- Batted: Right Threw: Right

MLB debut
- July 9, 1965, for the New York Yankees

Last MLB appearance
- July 23, 1965, for the New York Yankees

MLB statistics
- Win–loss record: 0–0
- Earned run average: 18.00
- Strikeouts: 2
- Stats at Baseball Reference

Teams
- New York Yankees (1965)

James Leroy Brenneman (February 13, 1941 – March 10, 1994) was an American Major League Baseball pitcher. Brenneman played for the New York Yankees in the 1965 baseball season. In three career games, he had a 0–0 record, with an 18.00 ERA. He batted and threw right-handed. Brenneman was the winning pitcher for the Yankees in their 1965 Hall of Fame exhibition game against the Philadelphia Phillies at Doubleday Field in Cooperstown.
