= George Korince =

Canadian baseball player (born 1946)

- Pitcher
- Born: January 10, 1946 (age 80); Ottawa, Ontario, Canada
- Batted: Right Threw: Right

MLB debut
- September 10, 1966, for the Detroit Tigers

Last MLB appearance
- May 27, 1967, for the Detroit Tigers

MLB statistics
- Win–loss record: 1–0
- Earned run average: 4.24
- Strikeouts: 13
- Stats at Baseball Reference

Teams
- Detroit Tigers (1966–1967)

George Eugene Korince (born January 10, 1946) is a Canadian former professional baseball pitcher who appeared in 11 games in Major League Baseball for the 1966 and 1967 Detroit Tigers. The right-hander, born in Ottawa, was listed as 6 feet 3 inches (1.91 m) tall and 210 pounds (95 kg) (15 stone).

Korince entered the minor leagues in 1965 and was called up to the Tigers in September 1966 after he had struck out 183 batters in 182 innings pitched for Double-A Montgomery. He made his major league debut at age 20, pitching a shutout inning against the Kansas City Athletics.

Detroit auditioned him exclusively as a relief pitcher, using him in two games in late 1966 and nine more during the opening weeks of the 1967 campaign. Korince threw shutout ball through his first six American League appearances, and was credited with his only decision, a victory, on May 13, 1967. Entering a game at Fenway Park in the eighth inning with Detroit trailing the Boston Red Sox 5–4, Korince held Boston off the scoreboard without allowing a hit. Then, in the ninth inning, he exited for a pinch hitter during a Tiger rally that produced six runs and a 10–4 lead. Detroit held on to win, 10–8, to cement Korince's triumph.

The next day, however, Korince surrendered five earned runs to the Red Sox in the second game of a doubleheader, breaking his shutout skein and ballooning his earned run average from 0.00 to 6.43. By the time he was sent back to the minors, after May 27, his ERA stood at 5.14. He never returned to the major leagues. In 17 full innings pitched, he allowed only 11 hits and fanned 13, but he issued 14 bases on balls and permitted eight earned runs. He posted a 1–0 record and no saves, with a career ERA of 4.24, high for its day.

His minor league career lasted until 1970, and in his last two seasons in the minors he had as many walks allowed as innings pitched, which likely contributed to his professional career ending at age 24.
