= Roger Repoz =

American baseball player (born 1940)

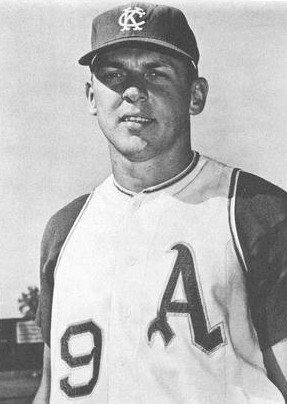
- Outfielder
- Born: August 3, 1940 (age 85); Bellingham, Washington, U.S.
- Batted: Left Threw: Left

MLB debut
- September 11, 1964, for the New York Yankees

Last MLB appearance
- June 9, 1972, for the California Angels

MLB statistics
- Batting average: .224
- Home runs: 82
- Runs batted in: 260

NPB statistics
- Batting average: .263
- Home runs: 122
- Runs batted in: 290
- Stats at Baseball Reference

Teams
- New York Yankees (1964–1966); Kansas City Athletics (1966–1967); California Angels (1967–1972); Taiheiyo Club Lions (1973); Yakult Swallows (1974–1977)

Roger Allen Repoz (born August 3, 1940) is an American former professional baseball outfielder, who played for nine seasons in Major League Baseball (MLB) for the New York Yankees, Kansas City Athletics and California Angels. He also played five seasons in Japan’s Nippon Professional Baseball (NPB), for the Taiheiyo Club Lions and Yakult Swallows.

Repoz was born in Bellingham, Washington. He batted and threw left-handed, stood 6 feet 3 inches (1.91 m) tall and weighed 190 pounds (86 kg). After graduating from Bellingham High School and Western Washington University, he was signed as an amateur free agent by the Yankees prior to the 1960 season.

In 1971, Repoz became the first player in MLB history to compile an OPS of greater than .700 while putting up a batting average of under .200 and playing in a minimum of 100 games.

He was traded from the Angels to the Baltimore Orioles for Jerry DaVanon in a 10 June 1972 minor league transaction with the former assigned to Rochester and the latter to Salt Lake City.

Strong defensively, Repoz posted a career .991 fielding percentage playing at all three outfield positions and first base.
