= Spud Murray =

Meredith Warrington "Spud" Murray (October 28, 1928 – September 15, 2011) was an American minor league baseball player and Major League Baseball (MLB) batting practice pitcher. Murray was possibly the first full-time batting practice pitcher in Yankees history.

== Career ==
Murray attended Media High School, where he starred in baseball and basketball, ranking among the best players in Delaware County, Pennsylvania. He signed with the Cleveland Indians. However, an arm injury limited his playing career. The Indians sold Murray to the independent Montgomery Rebels of the South Atlantic League in 1954.

Mayo Smith, the manager of the Philadelphia Phillies, hired Murray as his batting practice pitcher in 1958. He joined the New York Yankees in the same role two years later.

== Personal ==
Murray lived in Waterloo, Pennsylvania. He enjoyed hunting and fishing, often going fishing with Mickey Mantle and Whitey Ford.
