= Minnie Mendoza =

Cuban baseball player (1934–2024)

- Infielder
- Born: December 3, 1934; Ceiba del Agua, Cuba
- Died: September 9, 2024 (aged 89); Murrells Inlet, South Carolina, U.S.
- Batted: Right Threw: Right

MLB debut
- April 9, 1970, for the Minnesota Twins

Last MLB appearance
- June 7, 1970, for the Minnesota Twins

MLB statistics
- Batting average: .188
- Home runs: 0
- Runs batted in: 20
- Stats at Baseball Reference

Teams
- Minnesota Twins (1970)

Cristobal Rigoberto Mendoza Carreras (December 3, 1934 – September 9, 2024), better known as Minnie Mendoza, was a Cuban-American Major League Baseball infielder and coach who played for the Minnesota Twins during the 1970 MLB season.

== Biography ==
Minnie Mendoza was born on December 3, 1934, in Ceiba del Agua, Cuba.

=== Playing career ===
Mendoza played 10 years for minor league Charlotte Hornets.

Mendoza played 16 games for the Minnesota Twins during the 1970 MLB season as a 36-year-old rookie. In 16 at-bats, Mendoza compiled 3 hits and 2 runs, while recording a .188 batting average.

=== The Mendoza Line ===
Mendoza is featured in the controversy surrounding the naming of the Mendoza Line, meaning a .200 batting average. While most believe that the "Mendoza Line" first referred to by George Brett is named after 9-year veteran Mario Mendoza (who had a .215 career batting average and hit .198 in his biggest season), there is some controversy as to whether Brett was actually referring to Minnie Mendoza when he coined the famous phrase. However, Minnie did not play during the time of George Brett.

=== Coaching career ===
After retiring as a player, Mendoza was a coach for the Charlotte O's. Mendoza was also a first base coach for the Baltimore Orioles during the 1988 season. After the 1988 season, he became a roving minor league instructor in the Orioles organization.

Mendoza was a coach for the Burlington Indians in the Appalachian League and was manager for the team in 1992.

As of 2008, Mendoza was the Latin America field coordinator in the Cleveland Indians organization.

=== Death ===
Mendoza died in Murrells Inlet, South Carolina, on September 9, 2024, at the age of 89.

Preceded by Terry Crowley	Baltimore Orioles First Base Coach; 1988	Succeeded by Johnny Oates
