= Mike Jurewicz =

American baseball player (born 1945)

- Pitcher
- Born: September 20, 1945 (age 80); Buffalo, New York, U.S.
- Batted: Switch Threw: Left

MLB debut
- September 7, 1965, for the New York Yankees

Last MLB appearance
- September 28, 1965, for the New York Yankees

MLB statistics
- Win–loss record: 0–0
- Earned run average: 7.71
- Strikeouts: 2
- Stats at Baseball Reference

Teams
- New York Yankees (1965)

Michael Allen Jurewicz (born September 20, 1945) is an American former Major League Baseball pitcher. Jurewicz played for the New York Yankees in 1965. In 2 career games, he had a 0–0 record with a 7.71 ERA. He batted right and left and threw left-handed.

Jurewicz was born in Buffalo, New York but moved to Milwaukee, Wisconsin as a young child. In Milwaukee, he attended Pius XI High School. Although his high school coach was a scout for the hometown Milwaukee Braves, Jurewicz courted attention from 18 different Major League teams and signed with the New York Yankees.

He attended college at Marquette University, but did not play baseball for the school.

After his professional baseball career ended, he worked for General Motors Acceptance Corporation. He and his wife, Mary, had at least two daughters, Jennifer and Juliet.
