= Gil Blanco =

American baseball player (1945–2026)

- Pitcher
- Born: December 15, 1945; Phoenix, Arizona, U.S.
- Died: July 9, 2026 (aged 80); Phoenix, Arizona, U.S.
- Batted: Left Threw: Left

MLB debut
- April 24, 1965, for the New York Yankees

Last MLB appearance
- September 22, 1966, for the Kansas City Athletics

MLB statistics
- Win–loss record: 3–5
- Earned run average: 4.45
- Strikeouts: 35
- Stats at Baseball Reference

Teams
- New York Yankees (1965); Kansas City Athletics (1966)

Gilbert Henry Blanco (December 15, 1945 – July 9, 2026) was an American professional baseball pitcher. He was signed by the New York Yankees in 1964. Blanco pitched in Major League Baseball (MLB) for the Yankees in 1965 and the Kansas City Athletics in 1966. In 28 Major League games, nine as a starting pitcher, had a career record of 3–5, an ERA of 4.45, with 35 strikeouts and 48 bases on balls in 58 2/3 innings pitched.

Blanco died on July 9, 2026, at the age of 80.
