= Joe Pepitone =

American baseball player (1940–2023)

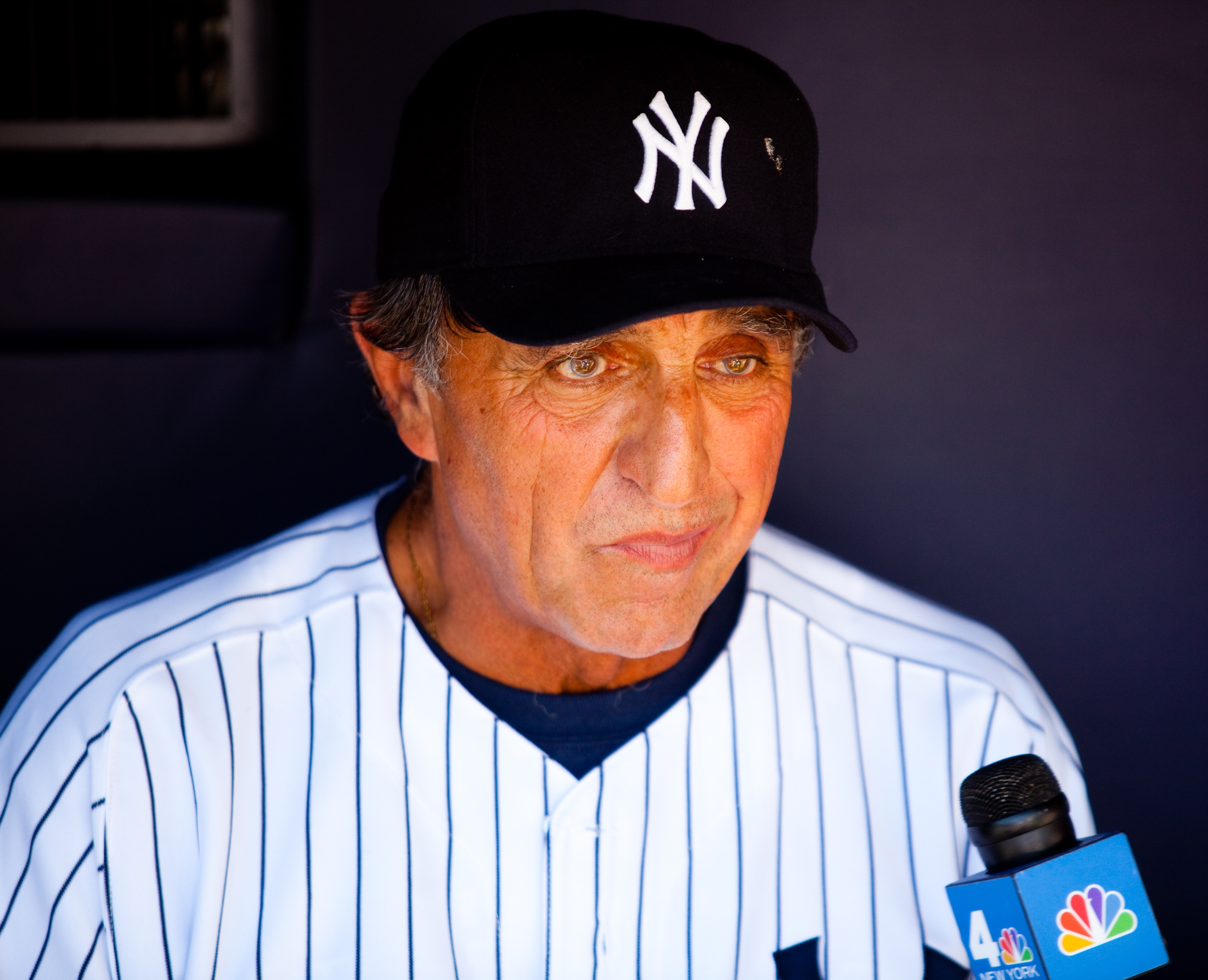
- Pepitone at the 2009 Yankees' Old-Timers' Day
- First baseman / Center fielder
- Born: October 9, 1940; Brooklyn, New York, U.S.
- Died: March 13, 2023 (aged 82); Kansas City, Missouri, U.S.
- Batted: Left Threw: Left

Professional debut
- MLB: April 10, 1962, for the New York Yankees
- NPB: June 20, 1973, for the Yakult Atoms

Last appearance
- MLB: May 25, 1973, for the Atlanta Braves
- NPB: August 19, 1973, for the Yakult Atoms

MLB statistics
- Batting average: .258
- Home runs: 219
- Runs batted in: 721

NPB statistics
- Batting average: .163
- Home runs: 1
- Runs batted in: 2
- Stats at Baseball Reference

Teams
- New York Yankees (1962–1969); Houston Astros (1970); Chicago Cubs (1970–1973); Atlanta Braves (1973); Yakult Atoms (1973)

Career highlights and awards
- 3× All-Star (1963–1965); 3× Gold Glove Award (1965, 1966, 1969)

Joseph Anthony Pepitone (October 9, 1940 – March 13, 2023) was an American professional baseball first baseman and outfielder who played in Major League Baseball (MLB) for the New York Yankees, Houston Astros, Chicago Cubs, and Atlanta Braves from 1962 to 1973 and for the Yakult Atoms of Nippon Professional Baseball in 1973. Pepitone was a three-time MLB All-Star and won three Gold Glove Awards.

== Early life ==
Pepitone was born in New York City, in the borough of Brooklyn, and raised in the Park Slope neighborhood. He had two younger brothers. Pepitone attended Manual Training High School.

Pepitone was shot by a classmate at age 17 while at school. He did not press charges against the shooter. In the same week, his father died from a stroke at age 39.

== Baseball career ==
=== New York Yankees ===
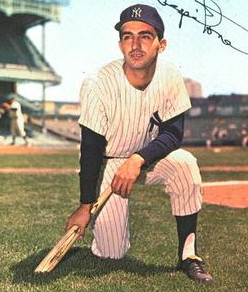
Pepitone in the 1960s

In August 1958, Pepitone signed with the New York Yankees as an amateur free agent. He played in 16 games for the Auburn Yankees of the Class D New York–Pennsylvania League after signing.

After playing four seasons in the minor leagues, Pepitone broke in with the New York Yankees in 1962, playing behind Moose Skowron at first base. He batted .239 in 63 games in 1962.

The Yankees management believed he could handle the first base job so traded Skowron to the Los Angeles Dodgers before the 1963 season. Pepitone batted .271 with 27 home runs and 89 runs batted in (RBIs) in 1963. In the 1963 World Series, he committed a costly error. With the score tied 1–1 in the seventh inning of Game Four, he lost a routine Clete Boyer throw in the white shirtsleeves of the Los Angeles crowd, and the batter, Jim Gilliam, went all the way to third base then scored the Series-winning run on a sacrifice fly by Willie Davis.

In 1964, Pepitone batted .251 with 28 home runs and 100 RBIs. In the 1964 World Series against the St. Louis Cardinals, he hit a grand slam in Game 6, but the Yankees lost the series.

Pepitone batted .247 in 1965 and .255 in 1966, as the Yankees finished 70–89 in last place. He batted .251 in 139 games in 1967 and .245 in 108 games in 1968.

Pepitone began to feud with the Yankees in 1969, leaving the team without permission for two days in August. He batted .242 with 27 home runs in the 1969 season.

=== Later career ===
After the 1969 season, despite having won his third Gold Glove Award, the Yankees traded Pepitone to the Houston Astros for Curt Blefary. Unhappy with how he was treated by the Astros, he threatened to retire in July 1970. The Astros sold Pepitone to the Chicago Cubs on waivers a week later. In Chicago, Pepitone replaced Ernie Banks at first base. Pepitone retired in May 1972, but returned to the Cubs after a few weeks away from the team. The Cubs traded Pepitone to the Atlanta Braves for Andre Thornton, and cash considerations on May 19, 1973. In Atlanta, he played only three games, after which he announced his intention to retire.

Pepitone then announced his intention to continue his career in Japan. In June 1973, Pepitone accepted an offer of $70,000 ($508,000 today) a year to play for the Yakult Atoms in Nippon Professional Baseball's Central League. In July, he returned to the United States. While in Japan, he hit .163 with one home run and two RBIs in 14 games. Pepitone spent his brief career in Japan skipping games for claimed injuries only to be seen out at night in discos, behavior which led the Japanese to adopt his name into their vernacular as a word meaning "goof off".Pepitone refuted the claims about faking injuries but this claim has been shown to be false.

== Life after baseball ==
=== Memoirs ===
Jim Bouton wrote about Pepitone in his 1970 book Ball Four. Bouton said that Pepitone went nowhere without a bag containing hair products for his rapidly balding head and that he took to wearing toupees.

In January 1975, Pepitone published his own tell-all baseball memoir, titled Joe, You Coulda Made Us Proud. The book received substantial attention for its many revelations, particularly about his abusive father and his self-lacerating candor about his self-destructive ways. Later that year, he posed nude for Foxy Lady magazine, featuring full frontal nudity.

=== Professional softball career ===
The American Professional Slo-Pitch League (APSPL) was the first of several men's professional slow-pitch softball leagues formed in the United States during the late 1970s and early 1980s. It built on the growth and talent in the booming men's amateur game during this period.

Pepitone joined the Trenton Statesmen of the APSPL, and put up respectable numbers in 1978 (110–225, .489, 14 HRs, 61 RBIs) and 1979 (50–122, .410, 9 HRs, 30 RBIs). The Detroit Caesars offered $30,000 to the Statesmen to buy Pepitone's contract in 1978. That offer was rejected. After the Trenton franchise disbanded in 1979, Pepitone became the team president and first baseman for Chicago Nationwide Advertising of the North American Softball League (NASL) during their 1980 season. Pepitone was suspended for six games by NASL Commissioner Robert Brown for "conduct detrimental to professional softball" and was out for the season in August with a thigh injury. The Yankees then hired him as a minor league hitting instructor at the end of the NASL season, bringing his professional softball career to a close.

=== MLB coaching ===
In October 1980, Pepitone was hired as a minor league hitting coach with the Yankees and brought to the major league club in June 1982. He was replaced by Lou Pinella in August of that summer. After Pepitone was sent to prison for drug offenses, Yankee owner George Steinbrenner re-hired him in 1988 as part of a work-release program to serve in the development of minor league players. Pepitone received a 1999 World Series ring for his relationship with the Yankees. He subsequently sold that ring at auction.

== Personal life ==
Pepitone and two other men were arrested in Brooklyn on March 18, 1985, after being stopped by the police for running a red light. The car contained nine ounces of cocaine, 344 quaaludes, a free-basing kit, a pistol, and about $6,300 in cash. Pepitone denied knowing there were drugs and guns in the vehicle. He spent four months at Rikers Island jail in 1988 for two misdemeanor drug convictions.

In January 1992, Pepitone was charged with misdemeanor assault in Kiamesha Lake, New York, after a scuffle police said was triggered when Pepitone was called a "has-been." He was arraigned in town court and released after he posted $75 bail. In October 1995, the 55-year-old Pepitone was arrested and charged with driving while intoxicated after losing control of his car in New York City's Queens–Midtown Tunnel. Police found Pepitone bloodied, disoriented, and mumbling as he walked through the tunnel. Authorities charged Pepitone with drunken driving after he refused to take a sobriety test. Pepitone pleaded guilty. When asked if he was staying away from alcohol, Pepitone responded, "I don't drink that much."

Pepitone was married three times, all ending in divorce. He had five children.

On March 13, 2023, Pepitone died of a suspected heart attack at his home in Kansas City, Missouri, at the age of 82.

== Sources ==
=== Books ===
- Bouton, Jim, and Leonard Shecter. Ball Four; My Life and Hard Times Throwing the Knuckleball in the Big Leagues. New York: World Pub. Co., 1970. 400 pages. (ISBN 0-9709117-0-X)
- Pepitone, Joe, and Berry Stainback. Joe, You Coulda Made Us Proud. Chicago: Playboy Press, 1975. 246 pages. (ISBN 0-87223-428-2)
- Pepitone, William A., and Joseph V. Soul of a Yankee: The Iron Horse, the Babe and the Battle for Joe Pepitone. Morrisville, North Carolina: Self-Published through lulu.com, 2011. 130 pages. (ISBN 0-55774-941-7)

=== Newspapers ===
- Yanks Harvest Bumper Farm Crop; Well-Balanced Array of Minor Leaguers Aids Champions All-Star Rookie Cast Includes Sons of Keller, Tresh – Mike Tresh's Son on List – New York Times article, January 3, 1962
- BROOKLYN TALENT AT YANKEE CAMP; Pepitone Stands Out – New York Times article, February 8, 1962
- YANKEE ROOKIES RATED BEST EVER; Houk Praises Tresh, Gibbs, Linz, Pepitone and Keller – New York Times article, February 25, 1962
- Mantle, Boyer Hit Homers As Yanks Top Orioles, 4–1; Yanks Turn Back Orioles, 4 to 1, On Homers by Mantle and Boyer – New York Times article, March 11, 1962
- Sports of The Times; Overheard at the Stadium – Time Marches On – Nuisance Hitter – The Hollywood Touch – New York Times article, April 11, 1962
- The Joe Pepitone Prayer: Don't Let Me Die in Japan; For 12 years—from 1962 – Joe Pepitone played first and outfield for the New York Yankees, Houston Astros and Chicago Cubs – New York Times article, May 19, 1974
- PEPITONE ARRESTED ON DRUG CHARGES – New York Times article, March 20, 1985
- "Pepitone Is Indicted By The Associated Press". The New York Times. May 4, 1985.
- "Pepitone Trial Starts". The New York Times. August 27, 1986.
- PEPITONE IS GUILTY OF LESSER CHARGES – New York Times article, September 18, 1986
- PEPITONE SENTENCED TO SIX MONTHS IN JAIL – New York Times article, October 23, 1986
- Pepitone to Begin 6-Month Jail Term – New York Times article, May 17, 1988
- "Pepitone Is Released". The New York Times. September 15, 1988.
- "SPORTS PEOPLE: BASEBALL; Pepitone Is Arrested". The New York Times. October 26, 1995.
