= Evansville White Sox =

Minor league baseball team in Evansville, Indiana (1966–1968)

The Evansville White Sox were a minor league baseball team based in Evansville, Indiana, that played in the Class-AA Southern League from 1966 to 1968.

The team moved to Evansville from Lynchburg, Virginia in 1966, retaining their affiliation with the Chicago White Sox. They played three seasons in Evansville before moving again, this time to Columbus, Georgia, where they became the Columbus White Sox starting in the 1969 season.

They played their home games at Bosse Field, the third-oldest professional baseball park in the United States, which opened in 1915.

== Year-by-year record ==
Year	Record	Finish	Manager	Playoffs
1966	68-72	3rd	George Noga	none
1967	76-63	3rd	George Noga	none
1968	55-84	6th	Stan Wasiak / Gary Johnson	none
