= Clark Griffith Park =

Former stadium in Charlotte, North Carolina, US

- Griffith Park
- Interactive map of Clark Griffith Park
- Former names: Jim Crockett Memorial Park (1977–1987); Knights Park (1988)
- Address: 400 Magnolia Ave; Charlotte, North Carolina
- Coordinates: 35°12′13″N 80°51′32″W
- Owner: Washington Senators
- Capacity: 3,200 (1940); 6,500 (1960); 5,500 (1985); 3,000 (1988)
- Field size: (1940); Left Field – 289 ft Center Field – 410 ft Right Field – 308 ft (1987); Left Field – 320 ft Center Field – 390 ft Right Field – 320 ft

Construction
- Built: 1940
- Opened: 1941
- Renovated: 1985
- Closed: 1987

Clark Griffith Park or better known as Griffith Park was a stadium in Charlotte, North Carolina, located at 400 Magnolia Avenue (the south corner of Magnolia and Lyndhurst Avenue) in the Dilworth section of town. It replaced Hayman Park, which was located at South Graham Street and West Bland Street, and was originally called Wearn Field when it opened in 1908.

Clark Griffith Park opened in 1941 and held as many as 5,000 people in a covered grandstand which extended from first base to third base. It was primarily used for baseball, and served as the home field for the Charlotte Hornets, an affiliate of the Washington Senators/ Minnesota Twins from 1937 to 1972 in various leagues ranging from Class B (equivalent to Class A today) to Class AA, and the Charlotte Orioles, a Class AA Southern League farm team of the Baltimore Orioles from 1976 to 1987.

The Negro American League Raleigh Tigers played at the ballpark on May 14, 1961.

After a renovation of the park in 1976 for the O's, the park was renamed Jim Crockett Memorial Park in 1977 (but was mostly called Crockett Park), both in honor of the promoter who brought the team, and to distance themselves from the former owners. The park was almost completely burned down on March 16, 1985. Investigators determined the fire was set by juveniles.

The Crockett family built a 3,000-seat makeshift stadium soon after the fire. However, it was completely exposed to the elements. The O's attendance fell off over the next 2 seasons, 1986, and 1987, because there was no protection for the fans. When the Charlotte O's last season was over George Shinn bought the team, and the stadium, and renamed it Knights Park. The team was renamed Knights out of a naming contest to distance the similarity between the major league affiliate. The new Charlotte "Knights" only played there for their first season in 1988, and in 1989, the team switched affiliations to the Chicago White Sox, and moved to a new and much bigger ballpark in Fort Mill, South Carolina, Knights Castle.

In March 2014, the Charlotte Knights unveiled four murals at its Truist Field along the S Graham Street side to commemorate the former Charlotte-area homes of professional baseball including Griffith Park.
