= 1966 Baltimore Orioles season =

Major League Baseball season

1966 Baltimore Orioles
- World Series champions American League champions
- League: American League
- Ballpark: Memorial Stadium
- City: Baltimore, Maryland
- Record: 97–63 (.606)
- League place: 1st
- Owners: Jerold Hoffberger
- General managers: Harry Dalton
- Managers: Hank Bauer
- Television: WJZ-TV
- Radio: WBAL (AM) (Chuck Thompson, Frank Messer, Bill O'Donnell)

The 1966 Baltimore Orioles season involved the Orioles finishing first in the American League with a record of 97 wins and 63 losses, nine games ahead of the runner-up Minnesota Twins. It was their first AL pennant since 1944, when the club was known as the St. Louis Browns. The Orioles swept the NL champion Los Angeles Dodgers in four games to register the first-ever World Series title in the franchise's 67-year history; the team had been founded in 1901 as the Milwaukee Brewers, moving to St. Louis in 1902 and to Baltimore in 1954.

The team was managed by Hank Bauer, and played their home games at Memorial Stadium. They drew 1,203,366 fans to their home ballpark, third in the ten-team league. It would be the highest home attendance of the team's first quarter-century at Memorial Stadium, and was eclipsed by the pennant-winning 1979 Orioles. This was the first season that the ballclub's uniforms featured both the smiling bird head logo on the caps and names on the back of the jerseys.

With their sweep of the Dodgers, the Orioles became the last of the eight franchises that made up the American League from 1903 to 1960 to win a World Series.

== Offseason ==
- October 12, 1965: John Orsino was traded by the Orioles to the Washington Senators for Woodie Held.
- November 29, 1965: Ron Stone was drafted from the Orioles by the Kansas City Athletics in the 1965 rule 5 draft.
- December 2, 1965: Norm Siebern was traded by the Orioles to the California Angels for Dick Simpson.
- December 6, 1965: Darold Knowles and Jackie Brandt were traded by the Orioles to the Philadelphia Phillies for Jack Baldschun.
- December 9, 1965: Milt Pappas, Jack Baldschun, and Dick Simpson were traded by the Orioles to the Cincinnati Reds for Frank Robinson.
- March 10, 1966: Lou Piniella was traded by the Orioles to the Cleveland Indians for Cam Carreon.

== Regular season ==
Right fielder Frank Robinson, acquired via trade from the Cincinnati Reds in the off-season, won the Triple Crown, leading the AL with a .316 average, 49 home runs, and 122 RBI. He was named winner of the American League MVP Award, becoming the first player in the history of Major League Baseball to win MVP honors in both the American and National Leagues.

On May 8, 1966, Frank Robinson hit a 540-foot home run off Cleveland Indians pitcher Luis Tiant, becoming the only player to hit a fair ball out of Memorial Stadium. It cleared the left field single-deck portion of the grandstand. A flag was later erected near the spot the ball cleared the back wall, with simply the word "HERE" upon it.

=== Season standings ===
American League
Team	W	L	Pct.	GB	Home	Road
Baltimore Orioles	97	63	.606	—	48‍–‍31	49‍–‍32
Minnesota Twins	89	73	.549	9	49‍–‍32	40‍–‍41
Detroit Tigers	88	74	.543	10	42‍–‍39	46‍–‍35
Chicago White Sox	83	79	.512	15	45‍–‍36	38‍–‍43
Cleveland Indians	81	81	.500	17	41‍–‍40	40‍–‍41
California Angels	80	82	.494	18	42‍–‍39	38‍–‍43
Kansas City Athletics	74	86	.463	23	42‍–‍39	32‍–‍47
Washington Senators	71	88	.447	25½	42‍–‍36	29‍–‍52
Boston Red Sox	72	90	.444	26	40‍–‍41	32‍–‍49
New York Yankees	70	89	.440	26½	35‍–‍46	35‍–‍43

=== Record vs. opponents ===
1966 American League record Sources:
Team	BAL	BOS	CAL	CWS	CLE	DET	KCA	MIN	NYY	WAS
Baltimore	—	12–6	12–6	9–9	8–10	9–9	11–5	10–8	15–3	11–7
Boston	6–12	—	9–9	11–7	7–11	8–10	9–9	6–12	8–10	8–10
California	6–12	9–9	—	8–10	10–8	9–9	9–9	11–7	11–7	7–11
Chicago	9–9	7–11	10–8	—	11–7	8–10	13–5	4–14	9–9–1	12–6
Cleveland	10–8	11–7	8–10	7–11	—	9–9	6–12	9–9	12–6	9–9
Detroit	9–9	10–8	9–9	10–8	9–9	—	6–12	11–7	11–7	13–5
Kansas City	5–11	9–9	9–9	5–13	12–6	12–6	—	8–10	5–13	9–9
Minnesota	8–10	12–6	7–11	14–4	9–9	7–11	10–8	—	8–10	14–4
New York	3–15	10–8	7–11	9–9–1	6–12	7–11	13–5	10–8	—	5–10
Washington	7–11	10–8	11–7	6–12	9–9	5–13	9–9	4–14	10–5	—

=== Opening Day starters ===
- Luis Aparicio
- Paul Blair
- Curt Blefary
- Wally Bunker
- Andy Etchebarren
- Davey Johnson
- Boog Powell
- Brooks Robinson
- Frank Robinson

=== Notable transactions ===
- May 21, 1966: Roger Freed was signed by the Orioles as an amateur free agent.
- June 13, 1966: Jerry Adair was traded by the Orioles to the Chicago White Sox for Eddie Fisher and minor leaguer John Riddle.
- July 1, 1966: Ron Stone was returned to the Orioles by the Kansas City Athletics.

=== Roster ===
1966 Baltimore Orioles
**Roster**
**Pitchers**: 13 Steve Barber; 38 Ed Barnowski; 24,40 Frank Bertaina; 32 Gene Brabender; 27 Wally Bunker; 25 Moe Drabowsky; 28 Eddie Fisher; 29 Dick Hall; 19 Dave McNally; 17 John Miller; 37 Stu Miller; 22 Jim Palmer; 36 Tom Phoebus; 24 Bill Short; 39 Eddie Watt	**Catchers**: 35 Cam Carreon; 8 Andy Etchebarren; 34 Larry Haney; 23 Vic Roznovsky; **Infielders**: 7 Jerry Adair; 11 Luis Aparicio; 7 Mark Belanger; 18 Mike Epstein; 2 Bob Johnson; 15 Davey Johnson; 26 Boog Powell; 5 Brooks Robinson	**Outfielders**: 6 Paul Blair; 3 Curt Blefary; 16 Sam Bowens; 12 Woodie Held; 20 Frank Robinson; 9 Russ Snyder; **Other batters**: 44 Charley Lau	**Manager**: 42 Hank Bauer; **Coaches**: 31 Harry Brecheen; 55 Billy Hunter; 41 Sherm Lollar; 14 Gene Woodling

=== Game log ===
Past games legend
Orioles Win (#bfb)	Orioles Loss (#fbb)	Game postponed (#bbb)	Clinched Pennant (#039)
Bold denotes an Orioles pitcher

1966 Game Log: 97–63 (Home: 48–31; Road: 49–32)
April: 11–1 (Home: 5–1; Road: 6–0)

#	Date	Opponent	Score	Win	Loss	Save	Attendance	Record	Streak
1	April 12	@ Red Sox	5–4 (13)	**S. Miller** (1–0)	Lonborg (0–1)	**Watt** (1)	12,386	1–0	W1
2	April 13	@ Red Sox	8–1	**Palmer** (1–0)	Morehead (0–1)		1,955	2–0	W2
3	April 15	Yankees	2–3	Peterson (1–0)	**Bunker** (0–1)		35,624	2–1	L1
4	April 16	Yankees	7–2	**McNally** (1–0)	Downing (0–1)	**S. Miller** (1)	12,128	3–1	W1
5	April 17	Yankees	5–4	**Hall** (1–0)	Ramos (0–2)	**S. Miller** (2)	27,802	4–1	W2
6	April 19	Senators	14–8	**Watt** (1–0)	Ortega (0–1)	**Drabowsky** (1)	6,045	5–1	W3
7	April 20	Senators	6–3	**Bunker** (1–1)	Richert (0–2)	**S. Miller** (3)	6,778	6–1	W4
8	April 23	@ Yankees	4–3	**McNally** (2–0)	Peterson (1–1)	**S. Miller** (4)	17,099	7–1	W5
9	April 24	@ Yankees	2–1	**Barber** (1–0)	Stottlemyre (0–2)		13,104	8–1	W6
10	April 26	Angels	7–3	**Palmer** (2–0)	McGlothlin (1–1)	**Hall** (1)	8,208	9–1	W7
—	April 27	Twins	Postponed (rain); Makeup: July 1						
—	April 28	Twins	Postponed (rain); Makeup: September 30						
11	April 29	@ Tigers	8–1	**Bunker** (2–1)	Monbouquette (2–2)		13,255	10–1	W8
12	April 30	@ Tigers	3–2	**McNally** (3–0)	McLain (3–1)	**S. Miller** (5)	5,130	11–1	W9

May: 14–16 (Home: 6–8; Road: 8–8)

#	Date	Opponent	Score	Win	Loss	Save	Attendance	Record	Streak
13	May 1	@ Tigers	4–1	**Barber** (2–0)	Sparma (1–1)	**Hall** (2)	11,719	12–1	W10
—	May 2	@ Senators	Postponed (rain); Makeup: June 6						
14	May 3	@ Senators	0–3	Ortega (1–1)	**Palmer** (2–1)	Cox (3)	8,550	12–2	L1
15	May 4	@ Senators	2–3	Lines (1–0)	**Bunker** (2–2)	Kline (2)	6,110	12–3	L2
16	May 6	Indians	3–2 (15)	**Hall** (2–0)	Allen (1–1)		30,767	13–3	W1
17	May 7	Indians	3–6	McMahon (1–0)	**S. Miller** (1–1)		9,953	13–4	L1
18	May 8	Indians	8–2	**Palmer** (3–1)	Siebert (2–1)		–	14–4	W1
19	May 8	Indians	8–3	**Bertaina** (1–0)	Tiant (3–1)		37,658	15–4	W2
20	May 10	White Sox	3–2 (12)	**Watt** (2–0)	Locker (2–2)		6,515	16–4	W3
21	May 11	White Sox	2–3 (11)	Locker (3–2)	**Brabender** (0–1)	Buzhardt (1)	10,063	16–5	L1
22	May 12	White Sox	3–5	Lamabe (1–0)	**Watt** (2–1)	Fisher (4)	6,079	16–6	L2
23	May 13	@ Indians	3–4 (11)	O'Donoghue (3–0)	**Hall** (2–1)		12,301	16–7	L3
24	May 14	@ Indians	1–2	Siebert (3–1)	**Bunker** (2–3)		12,518	16–8	L4
25	May 15	@ Indians	1–0 (13)	**Watt** (3–1)	Hargan (0–1)		–	17–8	W1
26	May 15	@ Indians	1–2	Stange (1–0)	**McNally** (3–1)		34,186	17–9	L1
27	May 17	Red Sox	8–6	**Watt** (4–1)	Stephenson (2–3)		8,442	18–9	W1
28	May 18	Red Sox	1–2 (10)	Wilson (3–2)	**Palmer** (3–2)		5,431	18–10	L1
29	May 19	Red Sox	1–3	Lonborg (1–2)	**Barber** (2–1)	Radatz (3)	5,477	18–11	L2
30	May 20	Tigers	8–4	**Bunker** (3–3)	Sparma (1–3)	**Watt** (2)	–	19–11	W1
31	May 20	Tigers	5–9	Monbouquette (3–3)	**McNally** (3–2)	Sherry (5)	26,094	19–12	L1
32	May 21	Tigers	5–7	McLain (7–1)	**J. Miller** (0–1)		24,946	19–13	L2
33	May 22	Tigers	2–3	Lolich (5–3)	**Bertaina** (1–1)	Podres (1)	16,694	19–14	L3
34	May 24	@ White Sox	6–4	**Palmer** (4–2)	Lamabe (1–1)	**Hall** (3)	13,335	20–14	W1
35	May 25	@ White Sox	2–3	John (3–2)	**Barber** (2–2)	Fisher (5)	14,079	20–15	L1
36	May 26	@ White Sox	7–1	**McNally** (4–2)	Pizarro (3–1)	**S. Miller** (6)	3,814	21–15	W1
37	May 27	@ Athletics	4–2	**Bunker** (4–3)	Sheldon (2–5)	**S. Miller** (7)	9,872	22–15	W2
38	May 28	@ Athletics	9–2	**Drabowsky** (1–0)	Terry (0–3)		12,393	23–15	W3
39	May 29	@ Athletics	3–6	Hunter (4–3)	**Palmer** (4–3)	Aker (5)	10,378	23–16	L1
40	May 30	@ Twins	5–1	**Barber** (3–2)	Merritt (0–3)	**S. Miller** (8)	26,482	24–16	W1
41	May 30	@ Twins	4–7	Worthington (2–1)	**Hall** (2–2)		12,140	24–17	L1
42	May 31	@ Twins	14–5	**Watt** (5–1)	Pascual (6–4)		7,072	25–17	W1

June: 25–8 (Home: 11–2; Road: 14–6)

#	Date	Opponent	Score	Win	Loss	Save	Attendance	Record	Streak
43	June 1	@ Angels	9–7 (10)	**Drabowsky** (2–0)	Brunet (2–3)	**Hall** (4)	22,862	26–17	W2
44	June 2	@ Angels	9–6 (10)	**S. Miller** (2–1)	Lee (2–2)		10,430	27–17	W3
45	June 3	Athletics	3–2	**Palmer** (5–3)	Hunter (4–4)		11,178	28–17	W4
46	June 4	Athletics	9–0	**Barber** (4–2)	Dobson (2–4)		–	29–17	W5
47	June 4	Athletics	6–5 (12)	**S. Miller** (3–1)	Sheldon (3–6)		24,213	30–17	W6
48	June 5	Athletics	4–9	Dickson (1–0)	**Bunker** (4–4)	Aker (7)	9,745	30–18	L1
49	June 6	@ Senators	3–5	Ortega (5–2)	**J. Miller** (0–2)		7,418	30–19	L2
50	June 7	Senators	6–5 (12)	**Watt** (6–1)	Bosman (1–2)		7,215	31–19	W1
51	June 8	Senators	6–5 (14)	**S. Miller** (4–1)	Humphreys (1–1)		–	32–19	W2
52	June 8	Senators	8–7	**Brabender** (1–1)	Bosman (1–3)	**Watt** (3)	9,612	33–19	W3
53	June 9	Senators	4–2	**McNally** (5–2)	Segui (2–5)	**S. Miller** (9)	6,318	34–19	W4
54	June 10	Red Sox	9–2	**Bunker** (5–4)	Stange (1–1)		16,052	35–19	W5
55	June 11	Red Sox	2–8	Lonborg (3–4)	**J. Miller** (0–3)	McMahon (2)	11,682	35–20	L1
56	June 12	Red Sox	8–1	**Barber** (5–2)	Wilson (5–5)		9,755	36–20	W1
57	June 13	Yankees	8–0	**Palmer** (6–3)	Downing (6–4)	**Watt** (4)	28,225	37–20	W2
58	June 14	Yankees	2–1	**S. Miller** (5–1)	Bouton (1–2)		37,891	38–20	W3
59	June 15	@ Senators	6–4	**Bunker** (6–4)	Bosman (1–4)	**Drabowsky** (2)	13,507	39–20	W3
60	June 16	@ Senators	1–2	Richert (7–6)	**Bertaina** (1–2)	Kline (10)	4,764	39–21	L1
61	June 17	@ Red Sox	5–3	**Barber** (6–2)	Lonborg (3–5)	**S. Miller** (10)	15,825	40–21	W1
62	June 18	@ Red Sox	16–6	**Palmer** (7–3)	Sadowski (1–1)	**Brabender** (1)	7,957	41–21	W2
63	June 19	@ Red Sox	5–3	**McNally** (6–2)	Stange (1–2)	**Fisher** (7)	–	42–21	W3
64	June 19	@ Red Sox	2–5	Santiago (5–4)	**J. Miller** (0–4)	Wyatt (3)	19,350	42–22	L1
65	June 21	@ Yankees	7–5	**Bunker** (7–4)	Stottlemyre (6–7)	**S. Miller** (11)	–	43–22	W1
66	June 21	@ Yankees	3–8	Reniff (1–0)	**Bertaina** (1–3)		29,449	43–23	L1
67	June 22	@ Yankees	3–0	**Barber** (7–2)	Talbot (5–5)		17,239	44–23	W1
68	June 23	@ Yankees	5–2	**Palmer** (8–3)	Downing (6–5)	**Fisher** (8)	10,640	45–23	W2
69	June 24	@ Angels	4–5 (14)	Sanford (8–2)	**Fisher** (1–4)		32,088	45–24	L1
70	June 25	@ Angels	1–0	**Bunker** (8–4)	Brunet (5–5)	**Hall** (5)	35,174	46–24	W1
71	June 26	@ Angels	12–7	**J. Miller** (1–4)	Rojas (2–2)	**Fisher** (9)	23,314	47–24	W2
72	June 27	@ Angels	4–1	**Barber** (8–2)	M. López (4–7)	**S. Miller** (12)	18,321	48–24	W3
73	June 28	@ Athletics	3–4	Dobson (4–6)	**Palmer** (8–4)	Aker (14)	11,291	48–25	L1
74	June 29	@ Athletics	5–2	**Hall** (3–2)	Krausse (4–4)		11,291	49–25	W1
75	June 30	@ Athletics	11–3	**Brabender** (2–1)	Terry (1–5)		8,137	50–25	W2

July: 19–10 (Home: 14–6; Road: 5–4)

#	Date	Opponent	Score	Win	Loss	Save	Attendance	Record	Streak
76	July 1	Twins	4–1	**Barber** (9–2)	Kaat (9–6)	**Fisher** (10)	–	51–25	W3
77	July 1	Twins	2–0	**Short** (1–0)	Merritt (0–6)		31,944	52–25	W4
78	July 2	Twins	6–5	**S. Miller** (6–1)	Roggenburk (1–2)		–	53–25	W5
79	July 2	Twins	3–2	**Fisher** (2–4)	Grant (5–11)		28,403	54–25	W6
80	July 3	Twins	4–2	**McNally** (7–2)	Cimino (1–2)	**S. Miller** (13)	15,715	55–25	W7
81	July 4	Athletics	6–9	Hunter (8–6)	**Brabender** (2–2)	Aker (17)	24,129	55–26	L1
82	July 6	Athletics	11–0	**Barber** (10–2)	Stafford (0–3)		–	56–26	W1
83	July 6	Athletics	8–9 (11)	Aker (5–1)	**J. Miller** (1–5)		14,409	56–27	L1
84	July 8	Angels	2–1	**S. Miller** (7–1)	M. López (4–9)		19,312	57–27	W1
85	July 9	Angels	10–2	**Palmer** (9–4)	Chance (7–10)	**Fisher** (11)	–	58–27	W2
86	July 9	Angels	1–2	Wright (3–2)	**McNally** (7–3)	Rojas (7)	27,606	58–28	L1
87	July 10	Angels	0–4	Brunet (9–5)	**Barber** (10–3)		16,632	58–29	L2
ASG	July 12	AL @ NL	1–2	Perry (1–0)	Richert (0–1)		49,936	—	N/A
88	July 14	@ Tigers	3–4	Wilson (9–7)	**Barber** (10–4)	Peña (3)	30,571	58–30	L3
89	July 15	@ Tigers	5–8 (13)	Monbouquette (5–6)	**S. Miller** (7–2)		43,647	58–31	L4
90	July 16	@ Tigers	8–2	**McNally** (8–3)	McLain (13–5)		29,767	59–31	W1
91	July 17	@ White Sox	1–5	Peters (6–7)	**Short** (1–1)		–	59–32	L1
92	July 17	@ White Sox	3–2	**Palmer** (10–4)	Lamabe (4–6)	**S. Miller** (14)	27,789	60–32	W1
93	July 18	@ White Sox	5–3	**J. Miller** (2–5)	Pizarro (6–5)	**Drabowsky** (3)	17,899	61–32	W2
94	July 19	Tigers	13–3	**Watt** (7–1)	Wilson (9–8)		24,261	62–32	W3
95	July 20	Tigers	10–7	**Brabender** (3–2)	McLain (13–6)	**Drabowsky** (4)	28,203	63–32	W4
96	July 21	Tigers	6–4	**McNally** (9–3)	Monbouquette (5–7)	**Fisher** (12)	29,107	64–32	W5
97	July 22	White Sox	3–1	**Palmer** (11–4)	Peters (6–8)		25,772	65–32	W6
98	July 23	White Sox	5–4	**Short** (2–1)	John (8–6)	**S. Miller** (15)	25,908	66–32	W7
99	July 24	White Sox	0–4	Howard (5–1)	**Watt** (7–2)		25,404	66–33	L1
100	July 26	Indians	4–7	Bell (11–6)	**Barber** (10–5)	Tiant (2)	23,990	66–34	L2
101	July 27	Indians	7–1	**McNally** (10–3)	O'Donoghue (6–7)		22,294	67–34	W1
102	July 29	@ Twins	3–0	**Palmer** (12–4)	Merritt (2–9)	**Fisher** (13)	30,288	68–34	W2
103	July 30	@ Twins	0–7	Boswell (10–5)	**Short** (2–2)		27,276	68–35	L1
104	July 31	@ Twins	4–0	**Watt** (8–2)	Kaat (14–8)	**Fisher** (14)	31,228	69–35	W1

August: 14–14 (Home: 4–7; Road: 10–7)

#	Date	Opponent	Score	Win	Loss	Save	Attendance	Record	Streak
105	August 2	@ Indians	8–6	**Hall** (4–2)	Kelley (3–6)		17,936	70–35	W2
106	August 3	@ Indians	6–9	Siebert (11–6)	**Palmer** (12–5)	Tiant (4)	14,432	70–36	L1
107	August 4	@ Indians	1–3	Bell (12–7)	**Short** (2–3)		13,036	70–37	L2
108	August 5	Senators	2–4	Humphreys (4–1)	**Watt** (8–3)	Kline (18)	14,618	70–38	L3
109	August 6	Senators	4–0	**McNally** (11–3)	Moore (2–1)		25,963	71–38	W1
110	August 7	@ Senators	2–6	Richert (12–9)	**J. Miller** (2–6)		14,703	71–39	L1
111	August 9	@ Yankees	1–4	Peterson (9–7)	**Palmer** (12–6)		21,109	71–40	L2
112	August 10	@ Yankees	9–4	**Hall** (5–2)	Talbot (9–9)		19,804	72–40	W1
113	August 11	@ Yankees	6–5 (11)	**Brabender** (4–2)	Ramos (3–8)		14,481	73–40	W2
114	August 12	@ Senators	2–1	**Drabowsky** (3–0)	Richert (12–10)	**Fisher** (15)	–	74–40	W3
115	August 12	@ Senators	1–4	Moore (3–1)	**J. Miller** (2–7)	Humphreys (2)	22,470	74–41	L1
116	August 13	Senators	5–2	**Palmer** (13–6)	Ortega (8–11)	**Fisher** (16)	19,202	75–41	W1
117	August 14	@ Senators	6–0	**Watt** (9–3)	Kreutzer (0–3)	**Brabender** (2)	11,769	76–41	W2
118	August 15	@ Red Sox	4–2 (11)	**Fisher** (3–4)	Wyatt (1–6)	**Hall** (6)	10,018	77–41	W3
119	August 16	@ Red Sox	6–4	**J. Miller** (3–7)	Brandon (4–6)		17,131	78–41	W4
120	August 17	@ Red Sox	8–4	**Palmer** (14–6)	Santiago (11–10)	**S. Miller** (16)	15,328	79–41	W5
121	August 19	@ Tigers	4–10	Lolich (12–8)	**Brabender** (4–3)		35,504	79–42	L1
122	August 20	@ Tigers	8–3	**McNally** (12–3)	McLain (14–11)	**Fisher** (17)	21,235	80–42	W1
123	August 21	@ Tigers	4–9	Wilson (15–9)	**Bunker** (8–5)		30,146	80–43	L1
124	August 23	Indians	1–2	McDowell (8–5)	**Palmer** (14–7)		22,578	80–44	L2
125	August 24	Indians	4–10	Siebert (14–7)	**Watt** (9–4)	Tiant (8)	19,427	80–45	L3
126	August 25	Indians	4–3 (11)	**S. Miller** (8–2)	Tiant (7–8)		17,079	81–45	W1
127	August 26	Red Sox	3–2 (12)	**Drabowsky** (4–0)	Osinski (2–3)		13,657	82–45	W2
128	August 27	Red Sox	2–3	Lonborg (7–8)	**Bertaina** (1–4)	McMahon (8)	23,790	82–46	L1
129	August 28	Red Sox	2–3	Brandon (5–7)	**Fisher** (3–5)	Wyatt (6)	12,220	82–47	L2
130	August 29	Tigers	3–6	McLain (16–11)	**McNally** (12–4)		22,941	82–48	L3
131	August 30	Tigers	4–5	Wilson (16–9)	**Watt** (9–5)	Peña (7)	28,207	82–49	L4
132	August 31	@ Indians	5–1	**J. Miller** (4–7)	Tiant (7–10)	**S. Miller** (17)	18,771	83–49	W1

September: 13–13 (Home: 7–6; Road: 6–7)

#	Date	Opponent	Score	Win	Loss	Save	Attendance	Record	Streak
133	September 1	@ Indians	1–4	Siebert (15–7)	**Palmer** (14–8)		16,476	83–50	L1
134	September 2	@ White Sox	8–9 (11)	Higgins (1–0)	**S. Miller** (8–3)		9,151	83–51	L2
135	September 3	@ White Sox	4–1	**Bunker** (9–5)	Lamabe (7–7)	**Hall** (7)	9,294	84–51	W1
136	September 4	@ White Sox	8–5	**Drabowsky** (5–0)	Locker (9–8)	**Fisher** (18)	17,725	85–51	W2
137	September 5	Yankees	5–4	**Fisher** (4–5)	Peterson (11–10)		–	86–51	W3
138	September 5	Yankees	7–4	**Hall** (6–2)	Downing (8–10)	**Fisher** (19)	36,832	87–51	W4
139	September 6	Yankees	4–1	**McNally** (13–4)	Bouton (2–7)		15,540	88–51	W5
140	September 7	Yankees	3–2	**Fisher** (5–5)	Stottlemyre (12–17)	**S. Miller** (18)	13,703	89–51	W6
141	September 9	@ Twins	1–6	Kaat (23–9)	**Watt** (9–6)		26,531	89–52	L1
142	September 10	@ Twins	2–7	Merritt (5–13)	**J. Miller** (4–8)		21,259	89–53	L2
143	September 11	@ Twins	6–11	Worthington (6–3)	**S. Miller** (8–4)		25,618	89–54	L3
144	September 12	Angels	5–6	Rojas (7–4)	**Fisher** (5–6)	Lee (14)	5,122	89–55	L4
—	September 13	Angels	Postponed (rain); Makeup: September 15						
—	September 14	Angels	Postponed (rain); Makeup: September 19						
145	September 15	Angels	2–0	**Phoebus** (1–0)	Chance (10–16)		–	90–55	W1
146	September 15	Angels	4–3	**Fisher** (6–6)	Kelso (0–1)		7,617	91–55	W2
147	September 16	White Sox	0–4	Horlen (9–12)	**McNally** (13–5)		14,326	91–56	L1
148	September 17	White Sox	1–3	John (14–9)	**Palmer** (14–9)		11,007	91–57	L2
149	September 18	White Sox	3–4	Howard (9–5)	**Bunker** (9–6)	Wilhelm (4)	12,036	91–58	L3
150	September 19	Angels	11–9	**Drabowsky** (6–8)	Sanford (13–7)		2,280	92–58	W1
151	September 20	@ Athletics	4–0	**Phoebus** (2–0)	Hunter (8–11)		10,828	93–58	W2
152	September 21	@ Athletics	10–8	**S. Miller** (9–4)	Stock (2–2)	**Fisher** (20)	12,021	94–58	W3
153	September 22	@ Athletics	6–1	**Palmer** (15–9)	Krausse (14–9)		5,250	95–58	W4
154	September 23	@ Angels	0–2	M. López (7–14)	**Bertaina** (1–5)		17,874	95–59	L1
155	September 24	@ Angels	6–3	**Bunker** (10–6)	Wright (4–7)	**Drabowsky** (5)	22,540	96–59	W1
156	September 25	@ Angels	1–6	Chance (11–17)	**Phoebus** (2–1)		14,785	96–60	L1
—	September 27	Athletics	Postponed (rain); Makeup: September 28; later September 29; then cancelled entirely (rain)						
—	September 28	Athletics	Postponed (rain); Makeup: September 29; then cancelled entirely (rain)						
157	September 30	Twins	7–10	Grant (13–13)	**McNally** (13–6)	Worthington (15)	–	96–61	L2
158	September 30	Twins	2–8	Merritt (7–14)	**Palmer** (15–10)		12,260	96–62	L3

October: 1–1 (Home: 1–1; Road: 0–0)

#	Date	Opponent	Score	Win	Loss	Save	Attendance	Record	Streak
—	October 1	Twins	Postponed (rain); Makeup: October 2						
159	October 2	Twins	6–2	**Bertaina** (2–5)	Kaat (25–13)	**Drabowsky** (6)	–	97–62	W1
160	October 2	Twins	0–1	Perry (11–7)	**Watt** (9–7)	Worthington (16)	13,340	97–63	L1

== Player stats ==
= Indicates team leader

= Indicates league leader

=== Batting ===
==== Starters by position ====
Note: Pos = Position; G = Games played; AB = At bats; H = Hits; Avg. = Batting average; HR = Home runs; RBI = Runs batted in

⌖	Player	G	AB	H	AVG	HR	RBI
C	Andy Etchebarren	121	412	91	.221	11	50
1B	Boog Powell	140	491	141	.287	34	109
2B	Davey Johnson	131	501	129	.257	7	56
3B	Brooks Robinson	157	620	167	.269	23	100
SS	Luis Aparicio	151	659	182	.276	6	41
LF	Curt Blefary	131	419	107	.255	23	64
CF	Paul Blair	133	303	84	.277	6	33
RF	Frank Robinson	155	576	182	.316	49	122

==== Other batters ====
Note: G = Games played; AB = At bats; H = Hits; Avg. = Batting average; HR = Home runs; RBI = Runs batted in

Player	G	AB	H	AVG	HR	RBI
Russ Snyder	117	373	114	.306	3	41
Sam Bowens	89	243	51	.210	6	20
Bob Johnson	71	157	34	.217	1	10
Vic Roznovsky	41	97	23	.237	1	10
Woodie Held	56	82	17	.207	1	7
Larry Haney	20	56	9	.161	1	3
Jerry Adair	17	52	15	.288	0	3
Mark Belanger	8	19	3	.158	0	0
Charley Lau	18	12	6	.500	0	5
Mike Epstein	6	11	2	.182	0	3
Cam Carreon	4	9	2	.222	0	2

=== Pitching ===
==== Starting pitchers ====
Note: G = Games pitched; IP = Innings pitched; W = Wins; L = Losses; ERA = Earned run average; SO = Strikeouts

Player	G	IP	W	L	ERA	SO
Dave McNally	34	213.0	13	6	3.17	158
Jim Palmer	30	208.1	15	10	3.46	147
Wally Bunker	29	142.2	10	6	4.29	89
Steve Barber	25	133.1	10	5	2.30	91
Bill Short	6	37.2	2	3	2.87	27
Tom Phoebus	3	22.0	2	1	1.23	17

==== Other pitchers ====
Note: G = Games pitched; IP = Innings pitched; W = Wins; L = Losses; ERA = Earned run average; SO = Strikeouts

Player	G	IP	W	L	ERA	SO
Eddie Watt	43	145.2	9	7	3.83	102
John Miller	23	100.2	4	8	4.74	81
Frank Bertaina	16	63.1	2	5	3.13	46

==== Relief pitchers ====
Note: G = Games pitched; W = Wins; L = Losses; SV = Saves; ERA = Earned run average; SO = Strikeouts

Player	G	W	L	SV	ERA	SO
Stu Miller	51	9	4	18	2.25	67
Eddie Fisher	44	5	3	13	2.64	39
Moe Drabowsky	44	6	0	7	2.81	98
Dick Hall	32	6	2	7	3.95	44
Gene Brabender	31	4	3	2	3.55	62
Ed Barnowski	2	0	0	0	3.00	2

== 1966 World Series ==
AL Baltimore Orioles (4) vs. NL Los Angeles Dodgers (0)
Game	Score	Date	Location	Attendance	Time of Game
1	Orioles – 5, Dodgers – 2	October 5	Dodger Stadium	55,941	2:56
2	Orioles – 6, Dodgers – 0	October 6	Dodger Stadium	55,947	2:26
3	Dodgers – 0, Orioles – 1	October 8	Memorial Stadium	54,445	1:55
4	Dodgers – 0, Orioles – 1	October 9	Memorial Stadium	54,458	1:45

== Awards and honors ==
- Frank Robinson, AL Most Valuable Player Award
- Frank Robinson, Associated Press Athlete of the Year
- Frank Robinson, Triple Crown Winner
- Frank Robinson, Babe Ruth Award
- Frank Robinson, World Series Most Valuable Player Award
- Brooks Robinson, All-Star Game MVP
- Gold Glove Awards
  - Brooks Robinson, third base
  - Luis Aparicio, shortstop

== Farm system ==
Level	Team	League	Manager
AAA	Rochester Red Wings	International League	Earl Weaver
AA	Elmira Pioneers	Eastern League	Darrell Johnson
A	Stockton Ports	California League	Harry Malmberg
A	Miami Marlins	Florida State League	Billy DeMars
A-Short Season	Aberdeen Pheasants	Northern League	Cal Ripken Sr.
Rookie	Bluefield Orioles	Appalachian League	Joe Altobelli

LEAGUE CHAMPIONS: Elmira
