= 1966 Kansas City Athletics season =

1966 Kansas City Athletics
- League: American League
- Ballpark: Municipal Stadium
- City: Kansas City, Missouri
- Record: 74–86 (.463)
- League place: 7th
- Owners: Charles O. Finley
- General managers: Ed Lopat
- Managers: Alvin Dark
- Television: KCMO
- Radio: KCMO (AM) (Monte Moore, Lynn Faris)

The 1966 Kansas City Athletics season was the 12th and penultimate season in Kansas City, and the 66th in overall franchise history. It involved the A's finishing seventh in the American League with a record of 74 wins and 86 losses (the team's best finish in Kansas City), 23 games behind the World Champion Baltimore Orioles. Paid attendance for the season was 773,929. The pitching staff had an earned run average of 3.56, which ranked sixth in the American League.

== Offseason ==
- October 15, 1965: Satchel Paige was released by the Athletics.
- November 28, 1965: Hank Peters resigned from the club and became the minor league director for the Cleveland Indians.
- November 29, 1965: Ron Stone was drafted by the Athletics from the Baltimore Orioles in the 1965 rule 5 draft.
- December 1, 1965: Jim Landis and Jim Rittwage were traded by the Athletics to the Cleveland Indians for Joe Rudi and Phil Roof.
- In early 1966, Jim Schaaf left the Athletics front office to work with the Kansas City Chiefs of the AFL.

== Regular season ==
- The club won their home opener (contested on April 19) and proceeded to lose 14 of their next 16 games. From June 19 to the final game of the season, the club won 50 games and lost 49, their best stretch since playing in Kansas City. The Athletics did not finish in last place for the first time in three years.

=== Season standings ===
American League
| Team | W | L | Pct. | GB | Home | Road |
|---|---|---|---|---|---|---|
| Baltimore Orioles | 97 | 63 | .606 | — | 48‍–‍31 | 49‍–‍32 |
| Minnesota Twins | 89 | 73 | .549 | 9 | 49‍–‍32 | 40‍–‍41 |
| Detroit Tigers | 88 | 74 | .543 | 10 | 42‍–‍39 | 46‍–‍35 |
| Chicago White Sox | 83 | 79 | .512 | 15 | 45‍–‍36 | 38‍–‍43 |
| Cleveland Indians | 81 | 81 | .500 | 17 | 41‍–‍40 | 40‍–‍41 |
| California Angels | 80 | 82 | .494 | 18 | 42‍–‍39 | 38‍–‍43 |
| Kansas City Athletics | 74 | 86 | .463 | 23 | 42‍–‍39 | 32‍–‍47 |
| Washington Senators | 71 | 88 | .447 | 25½ | 42‍–‍36 | 29‍–‍52 |
| Boston Red Sox | 72 | 90 | .444 | 26 | 40‍–‍41 | 32‍–‍49 |
| New York Yankees | 70 | 89 | .440 | 26½ | 35‍–‍46 | 35‍–‍43 |

=== Record vs. opponents ===
1966 American League record Sources:
| Team | BAL | BOS | CAL | CWS | CLE | DET | KCA | MIN | NYY | WAS |
|---|---|---|---|---|---|---|---|---|---|---|
| Baltimore | — | 12–6 | 12–6 | 9–9 | 8–10 | 9–9 | 11–5 | 10–8 | 15–3 | 11–7 |
| Boston | 6–12 | — | 9–9 | 11–7 | 7–11 | 8–10 | 9–9 | 6–12 | 8–10 | 8–10 |
| California | 6–12 | 9–9 | — | 8–10 | 10–8 | 9–9 | 9–9 | 11–7 | 11–7 | 7–11 |
| Chicago | 9–9 | 7–11 | 10–8 | — | 11–7 | 8–10 | 13–5 | 4–14 | 9–9–1 | 12–6 |
| Cleveland | 10–8 | 11–7 | 8–10 | 7–11 | — | 9–9 | 6–12 | 9–9 | 12–6 | 9–9 |
| Detroit | 9–9 | 10–8 | 9–9 | 10–8 | 9–9 | — | 6–12 | 11–7 | 11–7 | 13–5 |
| Kansas City | 5–11 | 9–9 | 9–9 | 5–13 | 12–6 | 12–6 | — | 8–10 | 5–13 | 9–9 |
| Minnesota | 8–10 | 12–6 | 7–11 | 14–4 | 9–9 | 7–11 | 10–8 | — | 8–10 | 14–4 |
| New York | 3–15 | 10–8 | 7–11 | 9–9–1 | 6–12 | 7–11 | 13–5 | 10–8 | — | 5–10 |
| Washington | 7–11 | 10–8 | 11–7 | 6–12 | 9–9 | 5–13 | 9–9 | 4–14 | 10–5 | — |

=== Notable transactions ===
- April 6, 1966: John O'Donoghue and cash were traded by the Athletics to the Cleveland Indians for Ralph Terry.
- April 13, 1966: Diego Seguí was purchased from the Athletics by the Washington Senators.
- May 27, 1966: Wayne Causey was traded by the Athletics to the Chicago White Sox for Danny Cater.
- June 7, 1966: 1966 Major League Baseball draft (June Draft) notable picks:

Round 1: Reggie Jackson (2nd pick)
Round 5: Dave Hamilton
Round 6: Warren Bogle
Round 20: Larry Burchart (did not sign)

- July 1, 1966: Ron Stone was returned by the Athletics to the Baltimore Orioles.
- July 30, 1966: Jim Duckworth was traded by the Athletics to the Washington Senators for Diego Seguí.
- August 6, 1966: Ralph Terry was purchased from the Athletics by the New York Mets.
- August 24, 1966: 1966 Major League Baseball draft (August Legion) notable picks:

Round 1: Pete Varney (did not sign)

=== Roster ===
1966 Kansas City Athletics
Roster
| Pitchers: 23 Jack Aker; 30 Gil Blanco; 22 Jim Dickson; 29 Chuck Dobson; 31 Jim Duckworth; 32 Bill Edgerton; 24 Guido Grilli; 17 Joe Grzenda; 26 Vern Handrahan; 31 Jesse Hickman; 27 Catfish Hunter; 20 Lew Krausse Jr.; 25 Paul Lindblad; 34 Aurelio Monteagudo; 33 Jim Nash; 13 Blue Moon Odom; 34 Ken Sanders; 15 Rollie Sheldon; 22 Bill Stafford; 15 Wes Stock; 28 Fred Talbot; 26 Ralph Terry; 33 John Wyatt | Catchers: 9 Billy Bryan; 18 Rene Lachemann; 4 Phil Roof; 8 Ken Suarez; 11 Tim Talton; Infielders: 6 Sal Bando; 8 Don Blasingame; 19 Bert Campaneris; 2 Danny Cater; 2 Wayne Causey; 16 Ed Charles; 22 John Donaldson; 7 Ernie Fazio; 1 Dick Green; 6 Ken Harrelson; 31 Randy Schwartz | Outfielders: 12 Ossie Chavarria; 21 Jim Gosger; 3 Mike Hershberger; 21 Manny Jiménez; 28 Rick Monday; 18,24 Joe Nossek; 9 Roger Repoz; 14 Larry Stahl; 11 Ron Stone; 10 José Tartabull | Manager: 5 Alvin Dark; Coaches: 44 Luke Appling; 42 Cot Deal (Pitching); 40 Bobby Hofman; 41 Al Vincent |

== Player stats ==
| = Indicates team leader |

| = Indicates league leader |

=== Batting ===
==== Starters by position ====
Note: Pos = Position; G = Games played; AB = At bats; H = Hits; Avg. = Batting average; HR = Home runs; RBI = Runs batted in

| Pos | Player | G | AB | H | Avg. | HR | RBI | SB |
|---|---|---|---|---|---|---|---|---|
| C | Phil Roof | 127 | 367 | 77 | .209 | 7 | 44 | 2 |
| 1B | Ken Harrelson | 63 | 210 | 47 | .224 | 5 | 22 | 9 |
| 2B | Dick Green | 140 | 507 | 127 | .250 | 9 | 62 | 6 |
| SS | Bert Campaneris | 142 | 573 | 153 | .267 | 5 | 42 | 52 |
| 3B | Ed Charles | 118 | 385 | 110 | .286 | 9 | 42 | 12 |
| LF | Larry Stahl | 119 | 312 | 78 | .250 | 5 | 34 | 5 |
| CF | Joe Nossek | 87 | 230 | 60 | .261 | 1 | 27 | 4 |
| RF | Mike Hershberger | 146 | 538 | 136 | .253 | 2 | 57 | 13 |

==== Other batters ====
Note: G = Games played; AB = At bats; H = Hits; Avg. = Batting average; HR = Home runs; RBI = Runs batted in

| Player | G | AB | H | Avg. | HR | RBI |
|---|---|---|---|---|---|---|
| Danny Cater | 116 | 425 | 124 | .292 | 7 | 52 |
| Roger Repoz | 101 | 319 | 69 | .216 | 11 | 34 |
| Jim Gosger | 88 | 272 | 61 | .224 | 5 | 27 |
| Ossie Chavarria | 86 | 191 | 46 | .241 | 2 | 10 |
| José Tartabull | 37 | 127 | 30 | .236 | 0 | 4 |
| Wayne Causey | 28 | 79 | 18 | .228 | 0 | 5 |
| Billy Bryan | 32 | 76 | 10 | .132 | 0 | 7 |
| Ken Suarez | 35 | 69 | 10 | .145 | 0 | 2 |
| Tim Talton | 37 | 53 | 18 | .340 | 2 | 6 |
| Rick Monday | 17 | 41 | 4 | .098 | 0 | 2 |
| Manny Jiménez | 13 | 35 | 4 | .114 | 0 | 1 |
| Ernie Fazio | 27 | 34 | 7 | .206 | 0 | 2 |
| John Donaldson | 15 | 30 | 4 | .133 | 0 | 1 |
| Sal Bando | 11 | 24 | 7 | .292 | 0 | 1 |
| Ron Stone | 26 | 22 | 6 | .273 | 0 | 0 |
| Don Blasingame | 12 | 19 | 3 | .158 | 0 | 1 |
| Randy Schwartz | 10 | 11 | 1 | .091 | 0 | 1 |
| Rene Lachemann | 5 | 5 | 1 | .200 | 0 | 0 |

=== Pitching ===
==== Starting pitchers ====
Note: G = Games pitched; IP = Innings pitched; W = Wins; L = Losses; ERA = Earned run average; SO = Strikeouts

| Player | G | IP | W | L | ERA | SO |
|---|---|---|---|---|---|---|
| Catfish Hunter | 30 | 176.2 | 9 | 11 | 4.02 | 102 |
| Jim Nash | 18 | 127.0 | 12 | 1 | 2.06 | 98 |
| Blue Moon Odom | 14 | 90.1 | 5 | 5 | 2.49 | 47 |
| Chuck Dobson | 14 | 83.2 | 4 | 6 | 4.09 | 61 |
| Rollie Sheldon | 14 | 69.0 | 4 | 7 | 3.13 | 26 |
| Fred Talbot | 11 | 67.2 | 4 | 4 | 4.79 | 37 |

==== Other pitchers ====
Note: G = Games pitched; IP = Innings pitched; W = Wins; L = Losses; ERA = Earned run average; SO = Strikeouts

| Player | G | IP | W | L | ERA | SO |
|---|---|---|---|---|---|---|
| Lew Krausse Jr. | 36 | 177.2 | 14 | 9 | 2.99 | 87 |
| Paul Lindblad | 38 | 121.0 | 5 | 10 | 4.17 | 69 |
| Ralph Terry | 15 | 64.0 | 1 | 5 | 3.80 | 33 |
| Bill Stafford | 9 | 39.2 | 0 | 4 | 4.99 | 31 |
| Gil Blanco | 11 | 38.1 | 2 | 4 | 4.70 | 21 |
| Bill Edgerton | 6 | 8.1 | 0 | 1 | 3.24 | 3 |

==== Relief pitchers ====
Note: G = Games pitched; W = Wins; L = Losses; SV = Saves; ERA = Earned run average; SO = Strikeouts

| Player | G | W | L | SV | ERA | SO |
|---|---|---|---|---|---|---|
| Jack Aker | 66 | 8 | 4 | 32 | 1.99 | 68 |
| Ken Sanders | 38 | 3 | 4 | 1 | 3.72 | 41 |
| Wes Stock | 35 | 2 | 2 | 3 | 2.66 | 31 |
| Jim Dickson | 24 | 1 | 0 | 1 | 5.35 | 20 |
| Joe Grzenda | 21 | 0 | 2 | 0 | 3.27 | 14 |
| John Wyatt | 19 | 0 | 3 | 2 | 5.32 | 25 |
| Vern Handrahan | 16 | 0 | 1 | 1 | 4.26 | 18 |
| Guido Grilli | 16 | 0 | 1 | 1 | 6.89 | 8 |
| Jim Duckworth | 8 | 0 | 2 | 1 | 9.00 | 10 |
| Aurelio Monteagudo | 6 | 0 | 0 | 0 | 2.84 | 3 |
| Jesse Hickman | 1 | 0 | 0 | 0 | 0.00 | 0 |

== Awards and honors ==
All-Star Game

- Catfish Hunter, Pitcher, Reserve

== Farm system ==
| Level | Team | League | Manager |
|---|---|---|---|
| AAA | Vancouver Mounties | Pacific Coast League | Mickey Vernon |
| AA | Mobile A's | Southern League | John McNamara |
| A | Modesto Reds | California League | Gus Niarhos |
| A | Leesburg Athletics | Florida State League | Jimmy Williams |
| A | Burlington Bees | Midwest League | Al Ronning |
| A-Short Season | Lewiston Broncos | Northwest League | Grady Wilson |

LEAGUE CHAMPIONS: Mobile, Modesto, Leesburg
