= 1966 Detroit Tigers season =

Major League Baseball season

1966 Detroit Tigers
- League: American League
- Ballpark: Tiger Stadium
- City: Detroit, Michigan
- Record: 88–74 (.543)
- League place: 3rd
- Owners: John Fetzer
- General managers: Jim Campbell
- Managers: Chuck Dressen, Bob Swift, Frank Skaff
- Television: WJBK (George Kell, Ray Lane)
- Radio: WJR (Ernie Harwell, Gene Osborn)

The 1966 Detroit Tigers season was the 66th consecutive season for the Detroit franchise in the American League. The Tigers, who had finished fourth in the ten-team AL in 1965 with an 89–73 record, won one less game in 1966, going 88–74, but moved up to third in the league, ten full games behind the eventual world champion Baltimore Orioles. The team attracted 1,124,293 fans to Tiger Stadium, fifth in the ten-team circuit.

== Regular season ==
The 1966 season saw the maturation of the core of the 1968 world champion Tiger club, and the addition of starting pitcher Earl Wilson, a future 20-game winner. But it was marred by the in-season illnesses, ultimately fatal, that struck manager Chuck Dressen and his immediate successor, interim pilot Bob Swift.

Dressen, 71, suffered a heart attack on May 16 (his second in two years) with Detroit 16–10, three games behind the Cleveland Indians. He was admitted to a Detroit hospital and third-base coach Swift, 51, took the reins as acting manager, as he had done in 1965. Under Swift, the Tigers won 32 of their next 57 games. But during the July 11–13 All-Star break, with Detroit in second place, eight games behind Baltimore, Swift was hospitalized for rapid weight loss and what was first suspected to be food poisoning. Tests revealed that he was suffering from lung cancer, and he was forced to step aside. Dressen died August 10, and Swift succumbed October 17.

Another Tiger coach, Frank Skaff, finished the season as acting manager, with the team playing only one game above the .500 mark for him, at 40–39. The Tigers eventually hired Mayo Smith as their new manager for 1967, and Smith would lead them to within one game of the 1967 pennant and the 1968 world title.

=== Season standings ===
American League
Team	W	L	Pct.	GB	Home	Road
Baltimore Orioles	97	63	.606	—	48‍–‍31	49‍–‍32
Minnesota Twins	89	73	.549	9	49‍–‍32	40‍–‍41
Detroit Tigers	88	74	.543	10	42‍–‍39	46‍–‍35
Chicago White Sox	83	79	.512	15	45‍–‍36	38‍–‍43
Cleveland Indians	81	81	.500	17	41‍–‍40	40‍–‍41
California Angels	80	82	.494	18	42‍–‍39	38‍–‍43
Kansas City Athletics	74	86	.463	23	42‍–‍39	32‍–‍47
Washington Senators	71	88	.447	25½	42‍–‍36	29‍–‍52
Boston Red Sox	72	90	.444	26	40‍–‍41	32‍–‍49
New York Yankees	70	89	.440	26½	35‍–‍46	35‍–‍43

=== Record vs. opponents ===
1966 American League record Sources:
Team	BAL	BOS	CAL	CWS	CLE	DET	KCA	MIN	NYY	WAS
Baltimore	—	12–6	12–6	9–9	8–10	9–9	11–5	10–8	15–3	11–7
Boston	6–12	—	9–9	11–7	7–11	8–10	9–9	6–12	8–10	8–10
California	6–12	9–9	—	8–10	10–8	9–9	9–9	11–7	11–7	7–11
Chicago	9–9	7–11	10–8	—	11–7	8–10	13–5	4–14	9–9–1	12–6
Cleveland	10–8	11–7	8–10	7–11	—	9–9	6–12	9–9	12–6	9–9
Detroit	9–9	10–8	9–9	10–8	9–9	—	6–12	11–7	11–7	13–5
Kansas City	5–11	9–9	9–9	5–13	12–6	12–6	—	8–10	5–13	9–9
Minnesota	8–10	12–6	7–11	14–4	9–9	7–11	10–8	—	8–10	14–4
New York	3–15	10–8	7–11	9–9–1	6–12	7–11	13–5	10–8	—	5–10
Washington	7–11	10–8	11–7	6–12	9–9	5–13	9–9	4–14	10–5	—

=== Notable transactions ===
- April 11, 1966: Mike Marshall was purchased by the Tigers from the Philadelphia Phillies.
- June 7, 1966: Les Cain was drafted by the Tigers in the 4th round of the 1966 Major League Baseball draft.
- June 14, 1966: Don Demeter and a player to be named later were traded by the Tigers to the Boston Red Sox for Joe Christopher and Earl Wilson. The Tigers completed the deal by sending Julio Navarro to the Red Sox at June 21.
- July 2, 1966: Tim Hosley was signed by the Tigers as an amateur free agent.

=== Roster ===
1966 Detroit Tigers
Roster
Pitchers: 37 Hank Aguirre; 18 Terry Fox; 20 Fred Gladding; 46 Bill Graham; 39 John Hiller; 49 George Korince; 29 Mickey Lolich; 17 Denny McLain; 27 Bill Monbouquette; 42 Julio Navarro; 28 Orlando Peña; 22 Johnny Podres; 15 Larry Sherry; 21 Joe Sparma; 14 Dave Wickersham; 16 Earl Wilson	Catchers: 35 Arlo Brunsberg; 11 Bill Freehan; 34 Orlando McFarlane; Infielders: 25 Norm Cash; 9 Jerry Lumpe; 3 Dick McAuliffe; 1 Ray Oyler; 32 Don Pepper; 44 Dick Tracewski; 8 Don Wert; 2 Jake Wood	Outfielders: 26 Gates Brown; 4 Don Demeter; 23 Willie Horton; 6 Al Kaline; 30 Jim Northrup; 24 Mickey Stanley	Manager: 7 Chuck Dressen; 55 Frank Skaff; 51 Bob Swift; Coaches: 52 Pat Mullin (First base); 53 Stubby Overmire (Pitching); 12 Mike Roarke (Bullpen); 55 Frank Skaff (Bench/third base); 51 Bob Swift (Third base)

== Player stats ==
=== Batting ===
==== Starters by position ====
Note: Pos = Position; G = Games played; AB = At bats; H = Hits; Avg. = Batting average; HR = Home runs; RBI = Runs batted in

Pos	Player	G	AB	H	Avg.	HR	RBI
C	Bill Freehan	136	492	115	.234	12	46
1B	Norm Cash	160	603	168	.279	32	93
2B	Jerry Lumpe	113	385	89	.231	1	26
SS	Dick McAuliffe	124	430	118	.274	23	56
3B	Don Wert	150	559	150	.268	11	70
LF	Willie Horton	146	526	138	.262	27	100
CF	Al Kaline	142	479	138	.288	29	88
RF	Jim Northrup	123	419	111	.265	16	58

==== Other batters ====
Note: G = Games played; AB = At bats; H = Hits; Avg. = Batting average; HR = Home runs; RBI = Runs batted in

Player	G	AB	H	Avg.	HR	RBI
Mickey Stanley	92	235	68	.289	3	19
Jake Wood	98	230	58	.252	2	27
Ray Oyler	71	210	36	.171	1	9
Gates Brown	88	169	45	.266	7	27
Orlando McFarlane	49	138	35	.254	5	13
Dick Tracewski	81	124	24	.194	0	7
Don Demeter	32	99	21	.212	5	12
Arlo Brunsberg	2	3	1	.333	0	0
Don Pepper	4	3	0	.000	0	0

=== Pitching ===
==== Starting pitchers ====
Note: G = Games pitched; IP = Innings pitched; W = Wins; L = Losses; ERA = Earned run average; SO = Strikeouts

Player	G	IP	W	L	ERA	SO
Denny McLain	38	264.1	20	14	3.92	192
Mickey Lolich	40	203.2	14	14	4.77	173
Earl Wilson	23	163.1	13	6	2.59	133

==== Other pitchers ====
Note: G = Games pitched; IP = Innings pitched; W = Wins; L = Losses; ERA = Earned run average; SO = Strikeouts

Player	G	IP	W	L	ERA	SO
Dave Wickersham	38	140.2	8	3	3.20	93
Johnny Podres	36	107.2	4	5	3.43	53
Hank Aguirre	30	103.2	3	9	3.82	50
Bill Monbouquette	30	102.2	7	8	4.73	61
Joe Sparma	29	91.2	2	7	5.30	61

==== Relief pitchers ====
Note: G = Games pitched; W = Wins; L = Losses; SV = Saves; ERA = Earned run average; SO = Strikeouts

Player	G	W	L	SV	ERA	SO
Larry Sherry	55	8	5	20	3.82	63
Orlando Peña	54	4	2	7	3.08	79
Fred Gladding	51	5	0	2	3.28	57
Terry Fox	4	0	1	1	6.30	6
George Korince	2	0	0	0	0.00	2
Bill Graham	1	0	0	0	0.00	2
John Hiller	1	0	0	0	9.00	1
Julio Navarro	1	0	0	0	inf	0

== Farm system ==
Level	Team	League	Manager
AAA	Syracuse Chiefs	International League	Frank Carswell
AA	Montgomery Rebels	Southern League	Wayne Blackburn
A	Rocky Mount Leafs	Carolina League	Al Federoff
A	Daytona Beach Islanders	Florida State League	Gail Henley
A	Statesville Tigers	Western Carolinas League	Al Lakeman and George Spencer

LEAGUE CHAMPIONS: Rocky Mount
