= Eddie Watt =

American baseball player (born 1941)

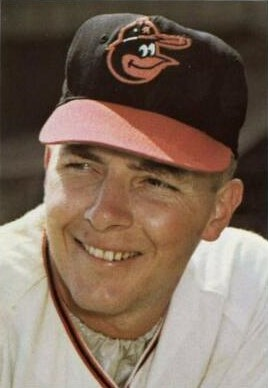
- Pitcher
- Born: April 4, 1941 (age 85); Lamoni, Iowa, U.S.
- Batted: Right Threw: Right

MLB debut
- April 12, 1966, for the Baltimore Orioles

Last MLB appearance
- June 14, 1975, for the Chicago Cubs

MLB statistics
- Win–loss record: 38–36
- Earned run average: 2.91
- Strikeouts: 462
- Saves: 80
- Stats at Baseball Reference

Teams
- Baltimore Orioles (1966–1973); Philadelphia Phillies (1974); Chicago Cubs (1975)

Career highlights and awards
- 2× World Series champion (1966, 1970); Baltimore Orioles Hall of Fame

Eddie Dean Watt (born April 4, 1941) is an American former professional baseball player. He played in Major League Baseball (MLB) as a right-handed relief pitcher from 1966 through 1975, most prominently as a key member of the Baltimore Orioles dynasty that won three consecutive American League pennants from 1969 to 1971, and won the World Series in 1970. He was also on the Orioles 1966 World Series championship team that swept the Los Angeles Dodgers. He also played for the Philadelphia Phillies and the Chicago Cubs. In 2000, Watt was inducted into the Baltimore Orioles Hall of Fame. He was involved in professional baseball as a player, manager or coach from 1962 to 2002.

== Early life ==
Watt was born on April 4, 1941, in Lamoni, Iowa, the son of Lawrence and Bonnie (Currie) Watt and the youngest of four children. Watt moved to Iowa City as a young teen, and became involved in organized baseball, including American Legion Baseball and semi-pro ball. He attended Iowa City High School. He was an All-American basketball player in high school.

In 1959, Watt attended Iowa State Teachers College (ISTC) (later the University of Northern Iowa) on a basketball scholarship. He lettered in baseball and basketball, but at 5 ft 10 in (1.78 m) did not believe he had a future in professional basketball; and chose to pursue professional baseball.

He won All-North Central Conference baseball honors in 1961. The team was in the NCAA playoffs with Watt as its top pitcher. In 1961, he had a 5–1 record, with a 1.98 earned run average (ERA) in 50 innings pitched with 56 strikeouts, giving up only 29 hits. His team reached the round before the 1961 College World Series, losing to eventual runner up Oklahoma State. He was scouted the Baltimore Orioles during those playoffs, and they invited him to play in the Basin League (college summer league) in South Dakota that summer. Orioles’ scout Jim Russo helped sign Watt.

He left school in 1961, just before his junior year in college, after signing a major league baseball contract with the Baltimore Orioles in early September 1961. Watt spent each fall taking classes at ISTC through 1965, until graduating in January 1966. He was inducted into the University of Northern Iowa's Hall of Fame in 1987.

== Professional career ==
=== Baltimore Orioles ===
In 1962, the Orioles assigned Watt to the Class D Appleton Foxes. He started 22 of the 25 games in which he appeared, with an 11–11 record and 2.19 ERA. He had 170 strikeouts in 160 innings pitched. In 1963, he was promoted to the Single-A Aberdeen Pheasants, managed by Cal Ripken Sr., where he was 10–12 in 23 starts, with a 3.14 ERA and 136 strikeouts in 172 innings pitched. His teammates included future Baltimore Orioles battery mate Andy Etchebarren. In 1964, he split time between Aberdeen and the Double-A Elmira Pioneers of the Eastern League. Still under Ripken at Aberdeen, in 16 starts he was 14–1, with a 1.77 ERA and 105 strikeouts in 137 innings pitched. His teammates included future Hall of Fame Orioles pitcher Jim Palmer, and Orioles gold glove shortstop Mark Belanger.

At Elmira in 1964, he played under future Orioles Hall of Fame manager Earl Weaver. He was 3–1 in seven starts, with a 2.86 ERA and 34 strikeouts in 44 innings pitched. In 1965, he spent time with both Elmira and the Orioles' Triple-A affiliate, the Rochester Red Wings. Still under Weaver at Elmira, he was 7–2 in 13 starts, with 1.85 ERA and 100 strikeouts in 107 innings pitched. He pitched two no-hitters with Elmira in 1965, two weeks apart, including on opening day. Two no-hitters in one season was a first in the Eastern League. At Rochester, he was 6–4 in 12 starts, with a 3.52 ERA and 73 strikeouts in 92 innings pitched.

Watt started in 93 of the 100 games in which he appeared as a minor league pitcher. Watt was called up to the Orioles in 1966, under manager Hank Bauer. In spring training that year, much to Watt's surprise, Bauer told Watt he would be joining the Orioles in 1966. He also told Watt he was planning to use Watt as a relief pitcher, even though he had been a starter in the minor leagues. Bauer originally used Watt as a relief pitcher that season, but put Watt in a starting role when he was short on starting pitchers. On the season, Watt started 13 games, and appeared in 30 other games for the Orioles as a relief pitcher. After 1966, he did not start another game for the remainder of his MLB career (1967 to 1975).

In 1966, he was 2–5 as a starter. He had a 7–2 record and 4 saves as a reliever for the 1966 World Series Champion Orioles. He was 6–1 as a relief pitcher before the All-Star break, and 12 of his 13 starts came after the break. He had a 3.83 ERA, with 102 strikeouts in 145.2 innings pitched; giving up only 44 bases on balls (averaging 2.7 bases on ball per nine innings pitched). On May 31, 1966, Watt hit a double, notably paralleling the "What's on second" line from Baseball Hall of Fame inductees Abbott and Costello's "Who's on First?" comedy routine. He did not appear in any of the four World Series games against the Los Angeles Dodgers. Jim Palmer, Wally Bunker, and Dave McNally all pitched complete games, and the team needed only one relief appearance, provided in record fashion by Moe Drabowsky. During the 1966 regular season, one writer called Watt the Orioles' "most pleasant surprise".

In 1967, during the preseason a baseball crashed into the left side of his face in a spring training drill, affecting his eye and ear, with his vision and hearing deteriorating over the years. During the season, he led the team in pitching appearances (49), on a pitching staff that also included relief pitchers Stu Miller, Drabowsky and Eddie Fisher. Watt was 3–5, with a 2.26 ERA, eight saves and 93 strikeouts in 103.2 innings pitched. In 1968, he became the Orioles closer. He pitched in 59 games (tied for fifth in the American League), with a 5–5 record and 11 saves (tied for eighth in the American League). He had a 2.27 ERA and 72 strikeouts in 83.1 innings pitched. Miller and Fisher were no longer on the team, but lefthanded relief pitcher Pete Richert joined the Orioles in 1968. During the 1968 season, his former Elmira manager Earl Weaver took over as Orioles manager after Bauer was fired.

In 1969, the Orioles won the American League pennant, after defeating the Minnesota Twins in the first American League Championship Series (ALCS), and were upset in the World Series by the New York Mets. Watt contributed to Baltimore's 109–53 regular season record with a career-high 16 saves and a career-low 1.65 earned run average in 71 innings. He was again the Orioles closer, appearing in a team high 56 games. He pitched two shoutout innings in Game 1 of the ALCS, retiring all six batters he faced. He appeared in two games in the 1969 World Series, giving up only one run in three innings; but was the losing pitcher in Game 5.

Watt was an important part of Baltimore's 1970 Championship season though it was not one of his best seasons statistically. He won seven games and saved 12 with a 3.25 ERA in 53 appearances. The Orioles finished the season 108–54, and then swept the Twins again in the 1970 ALCS. Watt did not pitch in that series as starters Jim Palmer (Game 3) and Dave McNally (Game 2) pitched complete games; and middle/long reliever Dick Hall pitched 4.2 shutout innings in relief of Cy Young Award winner Mike Cuellar to win Game 1.

The Orioles won the 1970 World Series over the Cincinnati Reds, 4–1. Watt was the losing pitcher in the Orioles' 6–5 loss to the Reds in Game 4. With the Orioles leading 5–3, he entered the contest in relief of Jim Palmer who had allowed a walk to Tony Pérez and a single to Johnny Bench to open the top of the eighth inning. Watt's first pitch to Reds' first baseman Lee May resulted in a three-run homer to left field that prevented the Orioles from sweeping the Series which it would eventually win the following day. Watt had not pitched in any game during the previous two weeks.

Some Baltimore fans remained unkind over the years toward Watt because of May's home run and the sole loss in that series; and while the incessant booing of fans did not bother him over the next three years as an Oriole, it did upset his children. Ironically, Watt was known for not throwing many home run pitches during his career, giving up only 10 from 1968 to 1972, in 295 innings pitched. May later became a popular player for the Orioles.

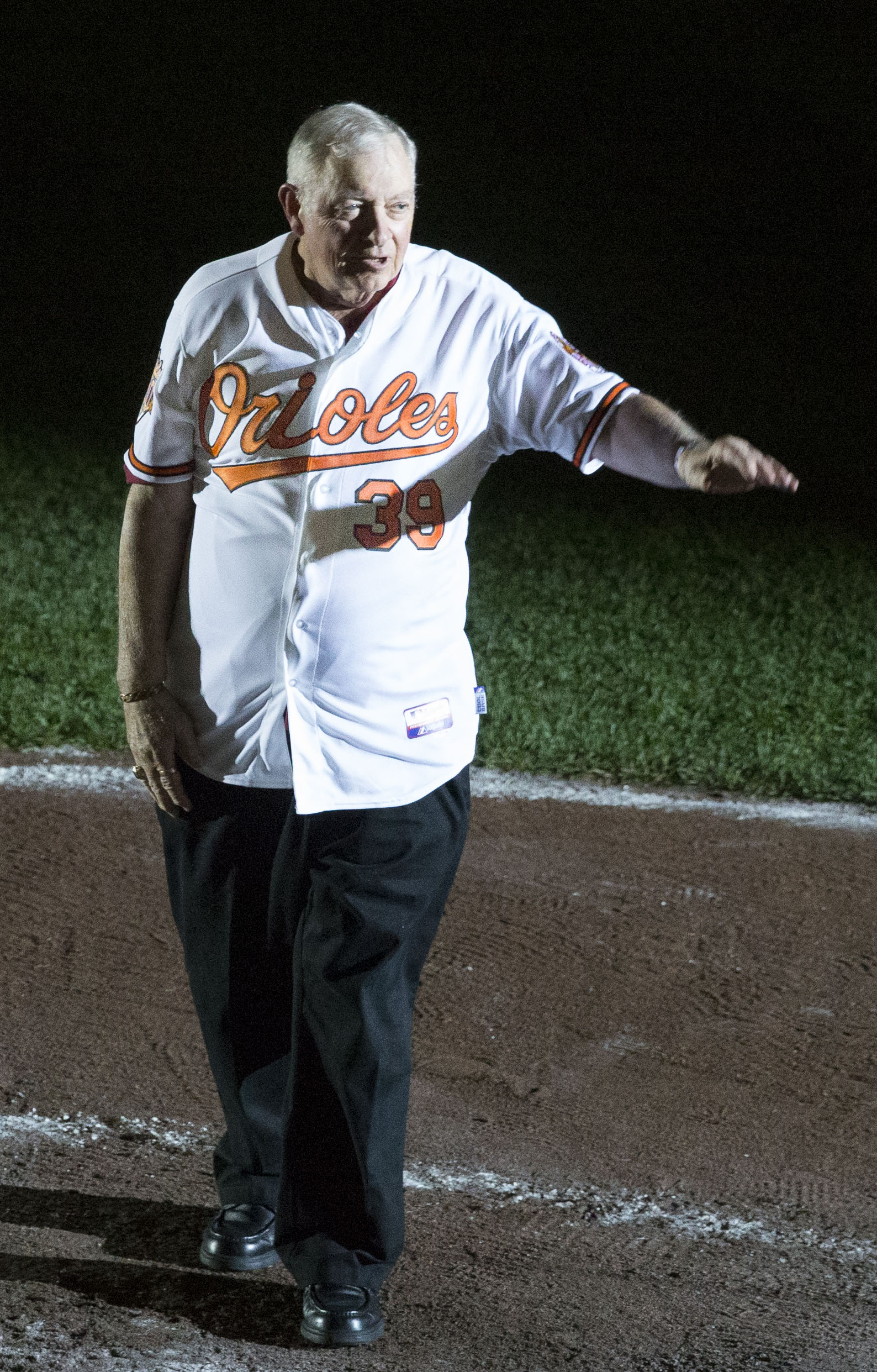
Watt in 2014

In 1971, Watt pitched in only 35 games, tied with Richert for most appearances in relief. He was 3–1 with a team-leading 11 saves. He had 26 strikeouts and only eight bases on balls in 39.2 innings pitched. His 1.8 bases on ball per nine innings and 3.25 strikeout to walk ratio were the best of his career. The Orioles finished the season 101–57, and faced the Oakland Athletics in the 1971 ALCS.

In Game 1 of the 1971 American League Championship Series versus the Athletics, Watt relieved starter Dave McNally, shutting out the A's for the last two innings, earning a save. The Orioles would go on to sweep the Athletics in three games. The Orioles faced the Pittsburgh Pirates in the 1971 World Series, losing in seven games. Watt made relief appearances in Games 3 and 4.

Watt played two more years for the Orioles. In 1972, he was 2–3 with seven saves and a 2.17 ERA. He had 23 strikeouts in 45.2 innings, the lowest strikeout per nine inning average of his career. He had knee surgery in 1972. In 1973, he was 3–4 with 3.30 ERA and five saves (third on the team). His 30 appearances were the lowest of his Orioles pitching career. The Orioles lost the 1973 ALCS to the A's, 3–2. Watt got the only batter out that he faced in that series.

He was consistently effective during seven seasons of pitching exclusively in relief for Baltimore. From 1967 to 1973 he averaged 46 appearances, 67 innings, and 10 saves with an ERA of 2.40.

As an Oriole he won 37 games, with 74 saves, and a 2.73 ERA. This is third best ERA in modern Oriole (post 1954) history, after Stu Miller and Hoyt Wilhelm. In 2000, Watt was inducted into the Baltimore Orioles Hall of Fame.

=== Philadelphia Phillies, Chicago Cubs and minor leagues ===
On December 7, 1973, Watt's contract was purchased by the Philadelphia Phillies for an estimated $70,000. In 1974 he appeared in 42 games for the Phillies, going 1–1 with 6 saves and a 3.99 ERA. He was released by Philadelphia just before Opening Day in 1975, and briefly played with the Chicago Cubs, injuring his pitching arm during his time with the Cubs. Watt made his last major league appearance on June 14, 1975. He spent most of the season with the Wichita Aeros of the American Association, the Cubs Triple-A affiliate; pitching 44 games in relief, going 4–5 with seven saves and a 3.89 ERA. The Cubs released him at the end of the season.

In 1976 and 1977, he pitched for the Hawaii Islanders, the San Diego Padres Triple-A affiliate in the Pacific Coast League. He was a player/coach in 1977. He played his last professional baseball in 1978, pitching in two games for the Padres' Single-A affiliate in the California League, the Reno Silver Fox. Watt also managed the Silver Fox in 1978.

=== Career ===
During his major league career, Watt started just 13 out of the 411 games he appeared in, all during his rookie season. Watt's career totals include a record of 38–36 in 411 games pitched, 13 games started, 1 complete game, 240 games finished, 80 saves, and an ERA of 2.91. In 659.2 innings he gave up just 37 home runs, an average of about one per 18 innings, and had a very low WHIP of 1.188. He had a batting average of .190 in 100 at bats with 3 home runs, hit against Johnny Podres, Frank Kreutzer, and Sam McDowell.

== Manager and coach ==
In 1978 and 1979, Watt managed the San Diego Padres' minor league affiliate the Reno Silver Sox of the Single-A California League. The team finished first in 1979 with a 74-67 record. The Padres then moved him up to the Amarillo Gold Sox of the Double-A Texas League in 1980. The team finished the season in first place in the West Division with a 77–59 record. He again managed the Gold Sox in 1981, with a 42–26 record for part of the season (winning the second half) and a 77–59 full season record again; just ½ game behind the San Antonio Dodgers on the season in the West Division. The 1981 team included future Hall of Famer Tony Gwynn. He was named Texas League Manager of the Year in 1981. He was let go after the season because of a change in the Padres' management, and other than rookie league baseball in 1982, this was his last year managing.

In December 1981, the Philadelphia Phillies hired Watt as a minor league pitching coach. He worked as a Phillies minor league pitching instructor in 1982 and 1983. After instructing rookies in early 1982, he managed the Phillies rookie league team in Bend, Oregon. In 1984, he was a pitching coach for the Double-A Reading Phillies of the Eastern League. In 1985, he coached the Peninsula Pilots of Hampton, Virginia, the Phillies Single-A affiliate in the Carolina League.

In 1986, he became the pitching coach for the Triple-A Tucson Toros of the Pacific Coast League, an affiliate of the Houston Astros. When he began coaching, Watt originally had hoped to get back to the Major Leagues as a pitching coach to obtain his 10-year pension, but as time went on this was not imperative to him, as he enjoyed coaching in the minor leagues. He was the Toros' pitching coach from 1986 to 1989.

In 1990, he became pitching coach for the Burlington Braves of the Single A Midwest League, an affiliate of the Atlanta Braves. He continued as a pitching coach in the Braves minor league system from 1991 until his retirement in 2002, as the Braves rookie league pitching coach. He was the pitching coach for the Gulf Coast Braves in the Rookie level Gulf Coast League. In 1994, he was involved with evaluating relief pitcher Gregg Olson for the Braves, during Olson's rehabilitation from injury.

== Personal life ==
As a player, manager and coach, Watt was known for being honest and direct in how he communicated with people, and not always concerned about how untactful this might appear.

During his career in Baltimore, Watt taught adult education in the offseason. In 1970, he visited with American soldiers in Viet Nam as part of a USO tour.

Watt married is second wife Betty Chapman in 1972. He moved to the small town of North Bend, Nebraska, where his wife was from, and had a 300-acre farm; growing corn and soybeans. During his minor league coaching years, in the offseason he worked 14-hour days at the Pops-Right Popcorn factory in North Bend. During his rookie league coaching career with the Braves, the Watts lived in various Florida cities for 12 years, though often spending the winters in North Bend.
