= 1966 Cleveland Indians season =

1966 Cleveland Indians
- League: American League
- Ballpark: Cleveland Municipal Stadium
- City: Cleveland, Ohio
- Owners: Gabe Paul, Vernon Stouffer
- General managers: Gabe Paul
- Managers: Birdie Tebbetts, George Strickland
- Television: WJW-TV (Harry Jones, Herb Score)
- Radio: WERE (Jimmy Dudley, Bob Neal)

The 1966 Cleveland Indians season was a season in American baseball. The team finished fifth in the American League with a record of 81–81, 17 games behind the Baltimore Orioles. This was the first season to feature the players' last names on the back of the jerseys.

== Offseason ==
- Vernon Stouffer bought 80% of the Cleveland Indians for $8,000,000.
- November 28, 1965: Hank Peters resigned from the Kansas City Athletics and became the minor league director for the Cleveland Indians.

=== Notable transactions ===
- November 29, 1965: Al Closter was selected by the Indians from the New York Yankees in the first-year player draft.
- November 29, 1965: Al Luplow was purchased from the Indians by the New York Mets.
- December 1, 1965: Joe Rudi and Phil Roof were traded by the Indians to the Kansas City Athletics for Jim Landis and Jim Rittwage.
- January 14, 1966: Lou Clinton was traded by the Indians to the New York Yankees for Doc Edwards.
- March 10, 1966: Cam Carreon was traded by the Indians to the Baltimore Orioles for Lou Piniella.

== Regular season ==
- On May 1, Sam McDowell threw his second consecutive one-hitter for the Indians.
- On May 8, 1966, Baltimore Orioles outfielder Frank Robinson hit a 540-foot home run off Indians pitcher Luis Tiant, becoming the only player to hit a fair ball out of Memorial Stadium.

=== Season standings ===
American League
Team	W	L	Pct.	GB	Home	Road
Baltimore Orioles	97	63	.606	—	48‍–‍31	49‍–‍32
Minnesota Twins	89	73	.549	9	49‍–‍32	40‍–‍41
Detroit Tigers	88	74	.543	10	42‍–‍39	46‍–‍35
Chicago White Sox	83	79	.512	15	45‍–‍36	38‍–‍43
Cleveland Indians	81	81	.500	17	41‍–‍40	40‍–‍41
California Angels	80	82	.494	18	42‍–‍39	38‍–‍43
Kansas City Athletics	74	86	.463	23	42‍–‍39	32‍–‍47
Washington Senators	71	88	.447	25½	42‍–‍36	29‍–‍52
Boston Red Sox	72	90	.444	26	40‍–‍41	32‍–‍49
New York Yankees	70	89	.440	26½	35‍–‍46	35‍–‍43

=== Record vs. opponents ===
1966 American League record Sources:
Team	BAL	BOS	CAL	CWS	CLE	DET	KCA	MIN	NYY	WAS
Baltimore	—	12–6	12–6	9–9	8–10	9–9	11–5	10–8	15–3	11–7
Boston	6–12	—	9–9	11–7	7–11	8–10	9–9	6–12	8–10	8–10
California	6–12	9–9	—	8–10	10–8	9–9	9–9	11–7	11–7	7–11
Chicago	9–9	7–11	10–8	—	11–7	8–10	13–5	4–14	9–9–1	12–6
Cleveland	10–8	11–7	8–10	7–11	—	9–9	6–12	9–9	12–6	9–9
Detroit	9–9	10–8	9–9	10–8	9–9	—	6–12	11–7	11–7	13–5
Kansas City	5–11	9–9	9–9	5–13	12–6	12–6	—	8–10	5–13	9–9
Minnesota	8–10	12–6	7–11	14–4	9–9	7–11	10–8	—	8–10	14–4
New York	3–15	10–8	7–11	9–9–1	6–12	7–11	13–5	10–8	—	5–10
Washington	7–11	10–8	11–7	6–12	9–9	5–13	9–9	4–14	10–5	—

=== Notable transactions ===
- April 6, 1966: Ralph Terry was traded by the Indians to the Kansas City Athletics for John O'Donoghue and cash.

=== Opening Day Lineup ===
Opening Day Starters
#	Name	Position
25	Vic Davalillo	CF
10	Max Alvis	3B
27	Leon Wagner	LF
21	Rocky Colavito	RF
23	Chuck Hinton	1B
24	Pedro González	2B
16	Larry Brown	SS
7	Del Crandall	C
48	Sam McDowell	P

=== Roster ===
1966 Cleveland Indians
Roster
Pitchers: 36 Bob Allen; 39 Gary Bell; 40 George Culver; 34 Steve Hargan; 37 Bob Heffner; 45 Tom Kelley; 31 Jack Kralick; 48 Sam McDowell; 44 Don McMahon; 32 John O'Donoghue; 46 Dick Radatz; 42 Sonny Siebert; 43 Lee Stange; 33 Luis Tiant	Catchers: 6 Joe Azcue; 5 Buddy Booker; 7 Del Crandall; 9 Duke Sims; Infielders: 10 Max Alvis; 16 Larry Brown; 12 Bill Davis; 13 Vern Fuller; 12 Jim Gentile; 24 Pedro González; 18 Dick Howser; 22 Tony Martínez; 17 Chico Salmon; 15 Fred Whitfield	Outfielders: 21 Rocky Colavito; 25 Vic Davalillo; 23 Chuck Hinton; 26 Jim Landis; 29 José Vidal; 27 Leon Wagner; Other batters: 14 George Banks; 29 Tony Curry; 30 Paul Dicken	Manager: 3 George Strickland (Aug 20 - Oct 2); 1 Birdie Tebbetts (Apr 11 - Aug 19); Coaches: 5 Ray Mueller; 4 Reggie Otero (First Base); 3 George Strickland (Third Base); 2 Early Wynn (Pitching)

== Player stats ==
=== Batting ===
==== Starters by position ====
Note: Pos = Position; G = Games played; AB = At bats; H = Hits; Avg. = Batting average; HR = Home runs; RBI = Runs batted in

Pos	Player	G	AB	H	Avg.	HR	RBI
C	Joe Azcue	98	302	83	.275	9	37
1B	Fred Whitfield	137	502	121	.241	27	78
2B	Pedro González	110	352	82	.233	2	17
SS	Larry Brown	105	340	78	.229	3	17
3B	Max Alvis	157	596	146	.245	17	55
LF	Leon Wagner	150	549	153	.279	23	66
CF	Vic Davalillo	121	344	86	.250	3	19
RF	Rocky Colavito	151	533	127	.238	30	72

==== Other batters ====
Note: G = Games played; AB = At bats; H = Hits; Avg. = Batting average; HR = Home runs; RBI = Runs batted in

Player	G	AB	H	Avg.	HR	RBI
Chico Salmon	126	422	108	.256	7	40
Chuck Hinton	123	348	89	.256	12	50
Jim Landis	85	158	35	.222	3	14
Dick Howser	67	140	32	.229	2	4
Duke Sims	52	133	35	.263	6	19
Del Crandall	50	108	25	.231	4	8
Vern Fuller	16	47	11	.234	2	2
Jim Gentile	33	47	6	.128	2	4
Bill Davis	23	38	6	.158	1	4
José Vidal	17	32	6	.188	0	3
Buddy Booker	18	28	6	.214	2	5
Tony Martínez	17	17	5	.294	0	0
Tony Curry	19	16	2	.125	0	3
George Banks	4	4	1	.250	0	1
Paul Dicken	2	2	0	.000	0	0

=== Pitching ===
==== Starting pitchers ====
Note: G = Games pitched; IP = Innings pitched; W = Wins; L = Losses; ERA = Earned run average; SO = Strikeouts

Player	G	IP	W	L	ERA	SO
Gary Bell	40	254.1	14	15	3.22	194
Sonny Siebert	34	241.0	16	8	2.80	163
Sam McDowell	35	194.1	9	8	2.87	225

==== Other pitchers ====
Note: G = Games pitched; IP = Innings pitched; W = Wins; L = Losses; ERA = Earned run average; SO = Strikeouts

Player	G	IP	W	L	ERA	SO
Steve Hargan	38	192.0	13	10	2.48	132
Luis Tiant	46	155.0	12	11	2.79	145
John O'Donoghue	32	108.0	6	8	3.83	49
Tom Kelley	31	95.1	4	8	4.34	64
Lee Stange	8	16.0	1	0	2.81	8
Bob Heffner	5	13.0	0	1	3.46	7
George Culver	5	9.2	0	2	8.38	6

==== Relief pitchers ====
Note: G = Games pitched; W = Wins; L = Losses; SV = Saves; ERA = Earned run average; SO = Strikeouts

Player	G	W	L	SV	ERA	SO
Dick Radatz	39	0	3	10	4.61	49
Bob Allen	36	2	2	5	4.21	33
Jack Kralick	27	3	4	0	3.82	31
Don McMahon	12	1	1	1	2.92	5

== Farm system ==
Level	Team	League	Manager
AAA	Portland Beavers	Pacific Coast League	Johnny Lipon
AA	Pawtucket Indians	Eastern League	Clay Bryant
A	Reno Silver Sox	California League	Phil Cavarretta
A	Dubuque Packers	Midwest League	Elmer Valo
