= 1966 Minnesota Twins season =

1966 Minnesota Twins
- League: American League
- Ballpark: Metropolitan Stadium
- City: Bloomington, Minnesota
- Record: 89–73 (.549)
- Divisional place: 2nd
- Owners: Calvin Griffith (majority owner, with Thelma Griffith Haynes)
- General managers: Calvin Griffith
- Managers: Sam Mele
- Television: WTCN-TV
- Radio: 830 WCCO AM (Ray Scott, Herb Carneal, Halsey Hall)

The 1966 Minnesota Twins season was the 6th season for the Minnesota Twins franchise in the Twin Cities of Minnesota, their 6th season at Metropolitan Stadium and the 66th overall in the American League.

The Twins finished 89–73, second in the American League. 1,259,374 fans attended Twins games, the second highest total in the American League.

== Regular season ==
In the June 9 game against the Kansas City Athletics, the Twins set a major-league record that still stands, by hitting five home runs in their half of the seventh inning. Only a Sandy Valdespino groundout amidst the onslaught kept them from being consecutive. Rich Rollins homered to drive in two, followed by solo shots by Zoilo Versalles, Tony Oliva, Don Mincher and Harmon Killebrew, with his second of the day.

On July 21, in a 1–0 three-hit win over the Washington Senators, pitcher Jim Merritt struck out seven consecutive batters in the middle innings to set an American League record.

Against the California Angels on August 18, the Twins turned their first-ever triple play, off a grounder by Frank Malzone. The play went Rich Rollins to César Tovar to Harmon Killebrew to retire the side.

Jim Kaat won an AL best 25 games. Kaat became the first pitcher in the history of the American League to win 25 games but not win the Cy Young Award. Kaat also won his fifth Gold Glove. He led the AL in: wins, games started, complete games, innings pitched, batters faced, most hits allowed, fewest walks per nine innings and strikeout-to-walk ratio. The Sporting News named Kaat the AL Pitcher of the Year.

Tony Oliva led the AL with 191 hits. Harmon Killebrew again led the team with 39 HR and 110 RBI.

Four Twins made the All-Star Game: first baseman Harmon Killebrew, outfielder Tony Oliva, catcher Earl Battey, and pitcher Jim Kaat.

=== Season standings ===
American League
Team	W	L	Pct.	GB	Home	Road
Baltimore Orioles	97	63	.606	—	48‍–‍31	49‍–‍32
Minnesota Twins	89	73	.549	9	49‍–‍32	40‍–‍41
Detroit Tigers	88	74	.543	10	42‍–‍39	46‍–‍35
Chicago White Sox	83	79	.512	15	45‍–‍36	38‍–‍43
Cleveland Indians	81	81	.500	17	41‍–‍40	40‍–‍41
California Angels	80	82	.494	18	42‍–‍39	38‍–‍43
Kansas City Athletics	74	86	.463	23	42‍–‍39	32‍–‍47
Washington Senators	71	88	.447	25½	42‍–‍36	29‍–‍52
Boston Red Sox	72	90	.444	26	40‍–‍41	32‍–‍49
New York Yankees	70	89	.440	26½	35‍–‍46	35‍–‍43

=== Record vs. opponents ===
1966 American League record Sources:
Team	BAL	BOS	CAL	CWS	CLE	DET	KCA	MIN	NYY	WAS
Baltimore	—	12–6	12–6	9–9	8–10	9–9	11–5	10–8	15–3	11–7
Boston	6–12	—	9–9	11–7	7–11	8–10	9–9	6–12	8–10	8–10
California	6–12	9–9	—	8–10	10–8	9–9	9–9	11–7	11–7	7–11
Chicago	9–9	7–11	10–8	—	11–7	8–10	13–5	4–14	9–9–1	12–6
Cleveland	10–8	11–7	8–10	7–11	—	9–9	6–12	9–9	12–6	9–9
Detroit	9–9	10–8	9–9	10–8	9–9	—	6–12	11–7	11–7	13–5
Kansas City	5–11	9–9	9–9	5–13	12–6	12–6	—	8–10	5–13	9–9
Minnesota	8–10	12–6	7–11	14–4	9–9	7–11	10–8	—	8–10	14–4
New York	3–15	10–8	7–11	9–9–1	6–12	7–11	13–5	10–8	—	5–10
Washington	7–11	10–8	11–7	6–12	9–9	5–13	9–9	4–14	10–5	—

=== Notable transactions ===
- June 7, 1966: 1966 Major League Baseball draft
  - Steve Garvey was drafted by the Twins in the 3rd round, but did not sign.
  - Roger Freed was drafted by the Twins, but the pick was voided.

=== Roster ===
1966 Minnesota Twins
Roster
Pitchers: 23 Dave Boswell; 35 Pete Cimino; 33 Mudcat Grant; 36 Jim Kaat; 35 Ron Keller; 27 Johnny Klippstein; 26 Jim Merritt; 30 Jim Ollom; 17 Camilo Pascual; 31 Jim Perry; 19 Bill Pleis; 30 Garry Roggenburk; 32 Jim Roland; 25 Dwight Siebler; 15 Al Worthington	Catchers: 10 Earl Battey; 29 George Mitterwald; 20 Russ Nixon; 22 Jerry Zimmerman; Infielders: 11,21 Bernie Allen; 24,34 Ron Clark; 3 Harmon Killebrew; 5 Don Mincher; 9 Rich Rollins; 12 César Tovar; 2 Zoilo Versalles	Outfielders: 4 Bob Allison; 7 Jimmie Hall; 8 Andy Kosco; 24 Joe Nossek; 6 Tony Oliva; 34,16 Ted Uhlaender; 28 Sandy Valdespino; Other batters: 18 Rich Reese	Manager: 14 Sam Mele; Coaches: 52 Jim Lemon; 1 Billy Martin; 51 Hal Naragon; 53 Johnny Sain

== Player stats ==
=== Batting ===
==== Starters by position ====
Note: Pos = Position; G = Games played; AB = At bats; H = Hits; Avg. = Batting average; HR = Home runs; RBI = Runs batted in

Pos	Player	G	AB	H	Avg.	HR	RBI
C	Earl Battey	115	364	93	.255	4	34
1B	Don Mincher	139	431	108	.251	14	62
2B	Bernie Allen	101	319	76	.238	5	30
3B	Harmon Killebrew	162	569	160	.281	39	110
SS	Zoilo Versalles	137	543	135	.249	7	36
LF	Jimmie Hall	120	356	85	.239	20	47
CF	Ted Uhlaender	105	367	83	.226	2	22
RF	Tony Oliva	159	622	191	.307	25	87

==== Other batters ====
Note: G = Games played; AB = At bats; H = Hits; Avg. = Batting average; HR = Home runs; RBI = Runs batted in

Player	G	AB	H	Avg.	HR	RBI
César Tovar	134	465	121	.260	2	41
Rich Rollins	90	269	66	.245	10	40
Bob Allison	70	168	37	.220	8	19
Andy Kosco	57	158	35	.222	2	13
Jerry Zimmerman	60	119	30	.252	1	15
Sandy Valdespino	52	108	19	.176	2	9
Russ Nixon	51	96	25	.260	0	7
George Mitterwald	3	5	1	.200	0	0
Rich Reese	3	2	0	.000	0	0
Ron Clark	5	1	1	1.000	0	1
Joe Nossek	4	0	0	----	0	0

=== Pitching ===
==== Starting pitchers ====
Note: G = Games pitched; IP = Innings pitched; W = Wins; L = Losses; ERA = Earned run average; SO = Strikeouts

Player	G	IP	W	L	ERA	SO
Jim Kaat	41	304.2	25	13	2.75	205
Mudcat Grant	35	249.0	13	13	3.25	110
Jim Perry	33	184.1	11	7	2.54	122
Dave Boswell	28	169.1	12	5	3.14	173
Camilo Pascual	21	103.0	8	6	4.89	56

==== Other pitchers ====
Note: G = Games pitched; IP = Innings pitched; W = Wins; L = Losses; ERA = Earned run average; SO = Strikeouts

Player	G	IP	W	L	ERA	SO
Jim Merritt	31	144.0	7	14	3.38	124
Jim Ollom	3	10.0	0	0	3.60	11

==== Relief pitchers ====
Note: G = Games pitched; W = Wins; L = Losses; SV = Saves; ERA = Earned run average; SO = Strikeouts

Player	G	W	L	SV	ERA	SO
Al Worthington	65	6	3	16	2.46	93
Pete Cimino	35	2	5	4	5.06	1
Johnny Klippstein	26	1	1	3	3.40	26
Dwight Siebler	23	2	2	1	3.44	24
Garry Roggenburk	12	1	2	1	5.84	3
Bill Pleis	8	1	2	0	1.93	9
Ron Keller	2	0	0	0	5.06	1
Jim Roland	1	0	0	0	0.00	1

== Farm system ==
Level	Team	League	Manager
AAA	Denver Bears	Pacific Coast League	Cal Ermer
AA	Charlotte Hornets	Southern League	Harry Warner
A	Wilson Tobs	Carolina League	Vern Morgan
A	Orlando Twins	Florida State League	Johnny Goryl
A	Wisconsin Rapids Twins	Midwest League	Ray Bellino
A	Thomasville Hi-Toms	Western Carolinas League	Ralph Rowe
A-Short Season	St. Cloud Rox	Northern League	Ken Staples
Rookie	GCL Twins	Gulf Coast League	Fred Waters

LEAGUE CHAMPIONS: St. Cloud
