= 1966 New York Yankees season =

Season for the Major League Baseball team the New York Yankees

1966 New York Yankees
- League: American League
- Ballpark: Yankee Stadium
- City: New York City
- Record: 70–89 (.440)
- League place: 10th
- Owners: CBS
- General managers: Ralph Houk, Dan Topping, Jr.
- Managers: Johnny Keane, Ralph Houk
- Television: WPIX (Red Barber, Phil Rizzuto, Jerry Coleman, Joe Garagiola)
- Radio: WCBS (AM) (Phil Rizzuto, Red Barber, Jerry Coleman, Joe Garagiola)

The 1966 New York Yankees season was the 64th season for the Yankees. The team finished with a record of 70–89, finishing 26.5 games behind the eventual World Series champion Baltimore Orioles. New York was managed by Johnny Keane and Ralph Houk. The Yankees played at Yankee Stadium. Keane managed his final MLB game in early May, and died the following January at the age of 55.

The Yankees finished in tenth place, although arguably a "strong" tenth. It was the first time they had finished in last place since 1912, their last year at the Hilltop. The Yankees would not finish in last place again for another twenty four years. It was also first time that the Yankees did not win the pennant in consecutive seasons since not winning the pennant in 3 straight seasons from 1944 to 1946.

On September 22, a paid attendance of 413 was announced at the 65,000-seat Yankee Stadium. WPIX announcer Red Barber asked the TV cameras to pan the empty stands as he commented on the low attendance. Although denied the camera shots on orders from the Yankees' head of media relations, he said, "I don't know what the paid attendance is today, but whatever it is, it is the smallest crowd in the history of Yankee Stadium, and this crowd is the story, not the game." By a horrible stroke of luck, that game was the first for CBS executive Mike Burke as team president. A week later, Barber was invited to breakfast where Burke told him that his contract would not be renewed.

== Offseason ==
- November 29, 1965: Rich Barry was drafted from the Yankees by the Philadelphia Phillies in the 1965 minor league draft.
- January 14, 1966: Doc Edwards was traded by the Yankees to the Cleveland Indians for Lou Clinton.
- January 29, 1966: Darrell Evans was drafted by the Yankees in the 2nd round of the 1966 Major League Baseball draft (secondary phase), but did not sign.

== Regular season ==
=== Season standings ===
American League
Team	W	L	Pct.	GB	Home	Road
Baltimore Orioles	97	63	.606	—	48‍–‍31	49‍–‍32
Minnesota Twins	89	73	.549	9	49‍–‍32	40‍–‍41
Detroit Tigers	88	74	.543	10	42‍–‍39	46‍–‍35
Chicago White Sox	83	79	.512	15	45‍–‍36	38‍–‍43
Cleveland Indians	81	81	.500	17	41‍–‍40	40‍–‍41
California Angels	80	82	.494	18	42‍–‍39	38‍–‍43
Kansas City Athletics	74	86	.463	23	42‍–‍39	32‍–‍47
Washington Senators	71	88	.447	25½	42‍–‍36	29‍–‍52
Boston Red Sox	72	90	.444	26	40‍–‍41	32‍–‍49
New York Yankees	70	89	.440	26½	35‍–‍46	35‍–‍43

=== Record vs. opponents ===
1966 American League record Sources:
Team	BAL	BOS	CAL	CWS	CLE	DET	KCA	MIN	NYY	WAS
Baltimore	—	12–6	12–6	9–9	8–10	9–9	11–5	10–8	15–3	11–7
Boston	6–12	—	9–9	11–7	7–11	8–10	9–9	6–12	8–10	8–10
California	6–12	9–9	—	8–10	10–8	9–9	9–9	11–7	11–7	7–11
Chicago	9–9	7–11	10–8	—	11–7	8–10	13–5	4–14	9–9–1	12–6
Cleveland	10–8	11–7	8–10	7–11	—	9–9	6–12	9–9	12–6	9–9
Detroit	9–9	10–8	9–9	10–8	9–9	—	6–12	11–7	11–7	13–5
Kansas City	5–11	9–9	9–9	5–13	12–6	12–6	—	8–10	5–13	9–9
Minnesota	8–10	12–6	7–11	14–4	9–9	7–11	10–8	—	8–10	14–4
New York	3–15	10–8	7–11	9–9–1	6–12	7–11	13–5	10–8	—	5–10
Washington	7–11	10–8	11–7	6–12	9–9	5–13	9–9	4–14	10–5	—

=== Notable transactions ===
- May 3, 1966: Al Closter was purchased by the Yankees from the Washington Senators.
- June 7, 1966: Joe Pactwa was drafted by the Yankees in the 18th round of the 1966 Major League Baseball draft.

=== Roster ===
1966 New York Yankees
Roster
Pitchers: 47,49 Stan Bahnsen; 56 Jim Bouton; 45 Jack Cullen; 24 Al Downing; 16 Whitey Ford; 19 Bob Friend; 39 Steve Hamilton; 29 Bill Henry; 52 Fritz Peterson; 14 Pedro Ramos; 18 Hal Reniff; 30 Mel Stottlemyre; 22 Fred Talbot; 58 Dooley Womack	Catchers: 23 Billy Bryan; 41 Jake Gibbs; 32 Elston Howard; Infielders: 12 Rubén Amaro; 42 Ray Barker; 6 Clete Boyer; 20 Horace Clarke; 43 Mike Ferraro; 34 Mike Hegan; 45 John Miller; 17 Bobby Murcer; 25 Joe Pepitone; 1 Bobby Richardson; 27 Dick Schofield	Outfielders: 40 Lou Clinton; 11 Héctor López; 7 Mickey Mantle; 9 Roger Maris; 43 Roger Repoz; 15 Tom Tresh; 28 Steve Whitaker; 48 Roy White	Manager: 35 Ralph Houk; 21 Johnny Keane; Coaches: 35 Vern Benson; 2 Frankie Crosetti; 44 Jim Hegan; 36 Wally Moses; 55 Spud Murray; 31 Jim Turner

== Player stats ==
= Indicates team leader

=== Batting ===
==== Starters by position ====
Note: Pos = Position; G = Games played; AB = At bats; H = Hits; Avg. = Batting average; HR = Home runs; RBI = Runs batted in

Pos	Player	G	AB	H	Avg.	HR	RBI
C	Elston Howard	126	410	105	.256	6	35
1B	Joe Pepitone	152	585	149	.255	31	83
2B	Bobby Richardson	149	610	153	.251	7	42
3B	Clete Boyer	144	500	120	.240	14	57
SS	Horace Clarke	96	312	83	.266	6	28
LF	Tom Tresh	151	537	125	.233	27	68
CF	Mickey Mantle	106	333	96	.288	23	56
RF	Roger Maris	119	348	81	.233	13	43

==== Other batters ====
Note: G = Games played; AB = At bats; H = Hits; Avg. = Batting average; HR = Home runs; RBI = Runs batted in

Player	G	AB	H	Avg.	HR	RBI
Roy White	115	316	71	.225	7	20
Jake Gibbs	62	182	47	.258	3	20
Lou Clinton	80	159	35	.220	5	21
Héctor López	54	117	25	.214	4	16
Steve Whitaker	31	114	28	.246	7	15
Ray Barker	61	75	14	.187	3	13
Billy Bryan	27	69	15	.217	4	5
Bobby Murcer	21	69	12	.174	0	5
Dick Schofield	25	58	9	.155	0	2
Roger Repoz	37	43	15	.349	0	9
Mike Hegan	13	39	8	.205	0	2
Mike Ferraro	10	28	5	.179	0	0
Rubén Amaro	14	23	5	.217	0	3
John Miller	6	23	2	.087	1	2

=== Pitching ===
==== Starting pitchers ====
Note: G = Games pitched; IP = Innings pitched; W = Wins; L = Losses; ERA = Earned run average; SO = Strikeouts

Player	G	IP	W	L	ERA	SO
Mel Stottlemyre	37	251.0	12	20	3.80	146
Fritz Peterson	34	215.0	12	11	3.31	96
Al Downing	30	200.0	10	11	3.56	152
Fred Talbot	23	124.1	7	7	4.15	85
Jim Bouton	24	120.1	3	8	2.69	65
Stan Bahnsen	4	23.0	1	1	3.52	16

==== Other pitchers ====
Note: G = Games pitched; IP = Innings pitched; W = Wins; L = Losses; ERA = Earned run average; SO = Strikeouts

Player	G	IP	W	L	ERA	SO
Whitey Ford	22	73.0	2	5	2.47	43
Bob Friend	12	44.2	1	2	4.84	22

==== Relief pitchers ====
Note: G = Games pitched; W = Wins; L = Losses; SV = Saves; ERA = Earned run average; SO = Strikeouts

Player	G	W	L	SV	ERA	SO
Pedro Ramos	52	3	9	13	3.61	58
Hal Reniff	56	3	7	9	3.21	79
Dooley Womack	42	7	3	4	2.64	50
Steve Hamilton	44	8	3	3	3.00	57
Jack Cullen	5	1	0	0	3.97	7
Bill Henry	2	0	0	0	0.00	3

== Farm system ==
Level	Team	League	Manager
AAA	Toledo Mud Hens	International League	Loren Babe
AA	Columbus Confederate Yankees	Southern League	Jack Reed
A	Greensboro Yankees	Carolina League	Gary Blaylock
A	Fort Lauderdale Yankees	Florida State League	Lamar North
A	Binghamton Triplets	New York–Penn League	Frank Verdi
Rookie	Johnson City Yankees	Appalachian League	Bob Bauer
Rookie	GCL Yankees	Gulf Coast League	Dick Berardino

LEAGUE CHAMPIONS: GCL Yankees
