= 1966 California Angels season =

Major League Baseball season

1966 California Angels
- League: American League
- Ballpark: Anaheim Stadium
- City: Anaheim, California
- Record: 80–82 (.494)
- League place: 6th
- Owner: Gene Autry
- General manager: Fred Haney
- Manager: Bill Rigney
- Television: KTLA
- Radio: KMPC (Buddy Blattner, Don Wells, Steve Bailey)
- Stats: ESPN.com; Baseball Reference

The 1966 California Angels season was the 6th season of the Angels franchise in the American League, the 1st in Anaheim, and their 1st season playing their home games at Anaheim Stadium. The Angels finished the season sixth in the American League with a record of 80 wins and 82 losses, 18 games behind the AL and World Series Champion Baltimore Orioles.

== Offseason ==
- November 29, 1965: Willie Montañez was drafted by the Angels from the St. Louis Cardinals in the 1965 first-year draft.
- December 2, 1965: Dick Simpson was traded by the Angels to the Baltimore Orioles for Norm Siebern.

== Regular season ==
=== Season standings ===
American League
Team	W	L	Pct.	GB	Home	Road
Baltimore Orioles	97	63	.606	—	48‍–‍31	49‍–‍32
Minnesota Twins	89	73	.549	9	49‍–‍32	40‍–‍41
Detroit Tigers	88	74	.543	10	42‍–‍39	46‍–‍35
Chicago White Sox	83	79	.512	15	45‍–‍36	38‍–‍43
Cleveland Indians	81	81	.500	17	41‍–‍40	40‍–‍41
California Angels	80	82	.494	18	42‍–‍39	38‍–‍43
Kansas City Athletics	74	86	.463	23	42‍–‍39	32‍–‍47
Washington Senators	71	88	.447	25½	42‍–‍36	29‍–‍52
Boston Red Sox	72	90	.444	26	40‍–‍41	32‍–‍49
New York Yankees	70	89	.440	26½	35‍–‍46	35‍–‍43

=== Record vs. opponents ===
1966 American League record Sources:
Team	BAL	BOS	CAL	CWS	CLE	DET	KCA	MIN	NYY	WAS
Baltimore	—	12–6	12–6	9–9	8–10	9–9	11–5	10–8	15–3	11–7
Boston	6–12	—	9–9	11–7	7–11	8–10	9–9	6–12	8–10	8–10
California	6–12	9–9	—	8–10	10–8	9–9	9–9	11–7	11–7	7–11
Chicago	9–9	7–11	10–8	—	11–7	8–10	13–5	4–14	9–9–1	12–6
Cleveland	10–8	11–7	8–10	7–11	—	9–9	6–12	9–9	12–6	9–9
Detroit	9–9	10–8	9–9	10–8	9–9	—	6–12	11–7	11–7	13–5
Kansas City	5–11	9–9	9–9	5–13	12–6	12–6	—	8–10	5–13	9–9
Minnesota	8–10	12–6	7–11	14–4	9–9	7–11	10–8	—	8–10	14–4
New York	3–15	10–8	7–11	9–9–1	6–12	7–11	13–5	10–8	—	5–10
Washington	7–11	10–8	11–7	6–12	9–9	5–13	9–9	4–14	10–5	—

=== Notable transactions ===
- May 5, 1966: Willie Montañez was returned by the Angels to the St. Louis Cardinals.
- June 7, 1966: Steve Hovley was drafted by the Angels in the 35th round of the 1966 Major League Baseball draft.
- August 12, 1966: Aurelio Rodríguez was purchased by the Angels from the Charros de Jalisco.

=== Roster ===
1966 California Angels
Roster
Pitchers: 43 George Brunet; 32 Lew Burdette; 31 Dean Chance; 46 Jim Coates; 41 Dick Egan; 22,41 Bill Kelso; 39 Bob Lee; 33 Marcelino López; 25 Ramón López; 45 Jim McGlothlin; 17 Fred Newman; 25 Howie Reed; 19 Minnie Rojas; 46 Jorge Rubio; 49 Jack Sanford; 23 Ed Sukla; 38 Clyde Wright	Catchers: 30 Tom Egan; 7 Buck Rodgers; 2 Tom Satriano; Infielders: 6 Joe Adcock; 11 Jim Fregosi; 12 Jackie Hernández; 29 Bobby Knoop; 15 Frank Malzone; 10 Willie Montañez; 42 Paul Schaal; 16 Norm Siebern; 14 Charlie Vinson	Outfielders: 1 José Cardenal; 10 Jay Johnstone; 8 Ed Kirkpatrick; 27 Bubba Morton; 28 Albie Pearson; 4 Jimmy Piersall; 3 Rick Reichardt; 35 Willie Smith; 26 Al Spangler; 26 Jackie Warner; Other batters: 25 Ed Bailey	Manager: 18 Bill Rigney; Coaches: 5 Marv Grissom; 20 Jack Paepke; 21 Salty Parker; 9 Del Rice

== Player stats ==
=== Batting ===
==== Starters by position ====
Note: Pos = Position; G = Games played; AB = At bats; H = Hits; Avg. = Batting average; HR = Home runs; RBI = Runs batted in

Pos	Player	G	AB	H	Avg.	HR	RBI
C	Buck Rodgers	133	454	107	.236	7	48
1B	Norm Siebern	125	336	83	.247	5	41
2B	Bobby Knoop	161	590	137	.232	17	72
3B	Paul Schaal	138	386	94	.244	6	24
SS	Jim Fregosi	162	611	154	.252	13	67
LF	Rick Reichardt	89	319	92	.288	16	44
CF	José Cardenal	154	561	155	.276	16	48
RF	Ed Kirkpatrick	117	312	60	.192	9	44

==== Other batters ====
Note: G = Games played; AB = At bats; H = Hits; Avg. = Batting average; HR = Home runs; RBI = Runs batted in

Player	G	AB	H	Avg.	HR	RBI
Jay Johnstone	61	254	67	.264	3	17
Joe Adcock	83	231	63	.273	18	48
Tom Satriano	103	226	54	.239	0	24
Willie Smith	90	195	36	.185	1	20
Frank Malzone	82	155	32	.206	2	12
Jimmy Piersall	75	123	26	.211	0	14
Jackie Warner	45	123	26	.211	7	16
Bubba Morton	15	50	11	.220	0	4
Jackie Hernández	58	23	1	.043	0	2
Charlie Vinson	13	22	4	.182	1	6
Tom Egan	7	11	0	.000	0	0
Al Spangler	6	9	6	.667	0	0
Ed Bailey	5	3	0	.000	0	0
Albie Pearson	2	3	0	.000	0	0
Willie Montañez	8	2	0	.000	0	0

=== Pitching ===
==== Starting pitchers ====
Note: G = Games pitched; IP = Innings pitched; W = Wins; L = Losses; ERA = Earned run average; SO = Strikeouts

Player	G	IP	W	L	ERA	SO
Dean Chance	41	259.2	12	17	3.08	180
George Brunet	41	212.0	13	13	3.31	148
Marcelino López	37	199.0	7	14	3.93	132
Fred Newman	21	102.2	4	7	4.73	42

==== Other pitchers ====
Note: G = Games pitched; IP = Innings pitched; W = Wins; L = Losses; ERA = Earned run average; SO = Strikeouts

Player	G	IP	W	L	ERA	SO
Clyde Wright	20	91.1	4	7	3.74	37
Jim McGlothlin	19	67.2	3	1	4.52	41
Jim Coates	9	31.2	1	1	3.98	16
Jorge Rubio	7	27.1	2	1	2.96	27
Ramón López	4	7.0	0	1	5.14	2

==== Relief pitchers ====
Note: G = Games pitched; W = Wins; L = Losses; SV = Saves; ERA = Earned run average; SO = Strikeouts

Player	G	W	L	SV	ERA	SO
Bob Lee	61	5	4	16	2.74	46
Lew Burdette	54	7	2	5	3.39	27
Jack Sanford	50	13	7	5	3.83	54
Minnie Rojas	47	7	4	10	2.88	37
Howie Reed	19	0	1	1	2.93	17
Ed Sukla	12	1	1	1	6.48	8
Dick Egan	11	0	0	0	4.40	11
Bill Kelso	5	1	1	0	2.38	11

== Farm system ==
Level	Team	League	Manager
AAA	Seattle Angels	Pacific Coast League	Bob Lemon
AA	El Paso Sun Kings	Texas League	Chuck Tanner
A	San Jose Bees	California League	Rocky Bridges
A	Quad Cities Angels	Midwest League	Harry Dunlop
Rookie	Idaho Falls Angels	Pioneer League	Tom Morgan, Alex Monchak, Joe Gordon and John Fitzpatrick

LEAGUE CHAMPIONS: Seattle

Records
Preceded by 1965	California Angels seasons 1966	Succeeded by 1967
