= 1966 Washington Senators season =

1966 Washington Senators
- League: American League
- Ballpark: D.C. Stadium
- City: Washington, D.C.
- Record: 71–88 (.447)
- League place: 8th
- Owners: James M. Johnston and James H. Lemon
- General managers: George Selkirk
- Managers: Gil Hodges
- Television: WTOP
- Radio: WTOP (Dan Daniels, John MacLean)

The 1966 Washington Senators season involved the Senators finishing eighth in the American League with a record of 71 wins and 88 losses.

== Offseason ==
- October 12, 1965: Woodie Held was traded by the Senators to the Baltimore Orioles for John Orsino.
- November 19, 1965: Don Zimmer was released by the Senators.
- November 29, 1965: Bob Saverine was drafted by the Senators from the Houston Astros in the 1965 rule 5 draft.

== Regular season ==
- Emmett Ashford, the first black umpire in Major League Baseball history made his debut at D.C. Stadium on April 9, 1966.

=== Opening Day starters ===
- Ed Brinkman
- Doug Camilli
- Joe Cunningham
- Ken Hamlin
- Frank Howard
- Don Lock
- Ken McMullen
- Pete Richert
- Fred Valentine

=== Season standings ===
American League
Team	W	L	Pct.	GB	Home	Road
Baltimore Orioles	97	63	.606	—	48‍–‍31	49‍–‍32
Minnesota Twins	89	73	.549	9	49‍–‍32	40‍–‍41
Detroit Tigers	88	74	.543	10	42‍–‍39	46‍–‍35
Chicago White Sox	83	79	.512	15	45‍–‍36	38‍–‍43
Cleveland Indians	81	81	.500	17	41‍–‍40	40‍–‍41
California Angels	80	82	.494	18	42‍–‍39	38‍–‍43
Kansas City Athletics	74	86	.463	23	42‍–‍39	32‍–‍47
Washington Senators	71	88	.447	25½	42‍–‍36	29‍–‍52
Boston Red Sox	72	90	.444	26	40‍–‍41	32‍–‍49
New York Yankees	70	89	.440	26½	35‍–‍46	35‍–‍43

=== Record vs. opponents ===
1966 American League record Sources:
Team	BAL	BOS	CAL	CWS	CLE	DET	KCA	MIN	NYY	WAS
Baltimore	—	12–6	12–6	9–9	8–10	9–9	11–5	10–8	15–3	11–7
Boston	6–12	—	9–9	11–7	7–11	8–10	9–9	6–12	8–10	8–10
California	6–12	9–9	—	8–10	10–8	9–9	9–9	11–7	11–7	7–11
Chicago	9–9	7–11	10–8	—	11–7	8–10	13–5	4–14	9–9–1	12–6
Cleveland	10–8	11–7	8–10	7–11	—	9–9	6–12	9–9	12–6	9–9
Detroit	9–9	10–8	9–9	10–8	9–9	—	6–12	11–7	11–7	13–5
Kansas City	5–11	9–9	9–9	5–13	12–6	12–6	—	8–10	5–13	9–9
Minnesota	8–10	12–6	7–11	14–4	9–9	7–11	10–8	—	8–10	14–4
New York	3–15	10–8	7–11	9–9–1	6–12	7–11	13–5	10–8	—	5–10
Washington	7–11	10–8	11–7	6–12	9–9	5–13	9–9	4–14	10–5	—

=== Notable transactions ===
- April 5, 1966: Al Closter was purchased by the Senators from the Cleveland Indians.
- April 13, 1966: Diego Seguí was purchased by the Senators from the Kansas City Athletics.
- July 30, 1966: Diego Seguí was traded by the Senators to the Kansas City Athletics for Jim Duckworth.

==== Draft picks ====
- June 7, 1966: Del Unser was drafted by the Senators in the 1st round (18th pick) of the secondary phase of the 1966 Major League Baseball draft. Player signed June 28, 1966.

=== Roster ===
1966 Washington Senators
Roster
Pitchers: 31 Dave Baldwin; 25,38 Dick Bosman; 22 Tom Cheney; 25 Al Closter; 37 Joe Coleman; 29,50 Casey Cox; 35 Pete Craig; 17 Jim Duckworth; 19 Jim Hannan; 18,23 Bob Humphreys; 27 Ron Kline; 31 Howie Koplitz; 32 Frank Kreutzer; 18 Dick Lines; 16 Mike McCormick; 25 Barry Moore; 20 Buster Narum; 26 Phil Ortega; 24 Pete Richert; 32 Diego Seguí	Catchers: 8 Mike Brumley; 21 Doug Camilli; 20 Paul Casanova; 28 Jim French; Infielders: 1 Don Blasingame; 11 Ed Brinkman; 10 Bob Chance; 1 Tim Cullen; 3 Joe Cunningham; 7 Ken Hamlin; 3 Ken Harrelson; 2 Ken McMullen; 5 Dick Nen; 12 John Orsino; 22 Dick Phillips; 15 Bob Saverine	Outfielders: 17 Hank Allen; 9 Frank Howard; 30 Jim King; 6 Willie Kirkland; 4 Don Lock; 34 Fred Valentine	Manager: 14 Gil Hodges; Coaches: 44 Joe Pignatano; 43 George Susce; 41 Rube Walker; 42 Eddie Yost

== Player stats ==
= Indicates team leader

=== Batting ===
==== Starters by position ====
Note: Pos = Position; G = Games played; AB = At bats; H = Hits; Avg. = Batting average; HR = Home runs; RBI = Runs batted in

Pos	Player	G	AB	H	Avg.	HR	RBI
C	Paul Casanova	122	429	109	.254	13	44
1B	Ken Harrelson	71	250	62	.248	7	28
2B	Bob Saverine	120	406	102	.251	5	24
SS	Ed Brinkman	158	582	133	.229	7	48
3B	Ken McMullen	147	524	122	.233	13	54
LF	Frank Howard	146	493	137	.278	18	71
CF	Don Lock	138	386	90	.233	16	48
RF	Jim King	117	310	77	.248	10	30

==== Other batters ====
Note: G = Games played; AB = At bats; H = Hits; Avg. = Batting average; HR = Home runs; RBI = Runs batted in

Player	G	AB	H	Avg.	HR	RBI
Fred Valentine	146	508	140	.276	16	59
Dick Nen	94	235	50	.213	6	30
Don Blasingame	68	200	43	.215	1	11
Willie Kirkland	124	163	31	.190	6	17
Ken Hamlin	66	158	34	.215	1	16
Doug Camilli	44	107	22	.206	2	8
Bob Chance	37	57	10	.175	1	8
Dick Phillips	25	37	6	.162	0	4
Tim Cullen	18	34	8	.235	0	0
Hank Allen	9	31	12	.387	1	6
Jim French	10	24	5	.208	0	3
John Orsino	14	23	4	.174	0	0
Mike Brumley	9	18	2	.111	0	0
Joe Cunningham	3	8	1	.125	0	0

=== Pitching ===
==== Starting pitchers ====
Note: G = Games pitched; IP = Innings pitched; W = Wins; L = Losses; ERA = Earned run average; SO = Strikeouts

Player	G	IP	W	L	ERA	SO
Pete Richert	36	245.2	14	14	3.37	195
Mike McCormick	41	216.0	11	14	3.46	101
Phil Ortega	33	197.1	12	12	3.92	121
Barry Moore	12	62.1	3	3	3.75	28
Jim Duckworth	5	14.1	0	3	5.02	14
Joe Coleman	1	9.0	1	0	2.00	4

==== Other pitchers ====
Note: G = Games pitched; IP = Innings pitched; W = Wins; L = Losses; ERA = Earned run average; SO = Strikeouts

Player	G	IP	W	L	ERA	SO
Jim Hannan	30	114.0	3	9	4.26	68
Diego Seguí	21	72.0	3	7	5.00	54
Dick Bosman	13	39.0	2	6	7.60	20
Frank Kreutzer	9	31.1	0	5	6.03	24
Tom Cheney	3	5.1	0	1	5.06	3

==== Relief pitchers ====
Note: G = Games pitched; W = Wins; L = Losses; SV = Saves; ERA = Earned run average; SO = Strikeouts

Player	G	W	L	SV	ERA	SO
Ron Kline	63	6	4	23	2.39	46
Casey Cox	66	4	5	7	3.50	46
Bob Humphreys	58	7	3	3	2.82	88
Dick Lines	53	5	2	2	2.28	49
Dave Baldwin	4	0	0	0	3.86	4
Buster Narum	3	0	0	0	21.60	0
Howie Koplitz	1	0	0	0	0.00	0
Pete Craig	1	0	0	0	4.50	1
Al Closter	1	0	0	0	0.00	0

== Farm system ==
Level	Team	League	Manager
AAA	Hawaii Islanders	Pacific Coast League	George Case
AA	York White Roses	Eastern League	Billy Klaus
A	Burlington Senators	Carolina League	Wayne Terwilliger
A	Geneva Senators	New York–Penn League	Gordon Mackenzie
