= Tim Talton =

American baseball player (1939–2021)

- Catcher / First baseman
- Born: January 14, 1939; Pikeville, North Carolina, U.S.
- Died: July 22, 2021 (aged 82); Goldsboro, North Carolina, U.S.
- Batted: Left Threw: Right

MLB debut
- July 8, 1966, for the Kansas City Athletics

Last MLB appearance
- October 1, 1967, for the Kansas City Athletics

MLB statistics
- Batting average: .295
- Home runs: 2
- Runs batted in: 11
- Stats at Baseball Reference

Teams
- Kansas City Athletics (1966–1967)

Marion Lee "Tim" Talton (January 14, 1939 – July 22, 2021) was an American professional baseball player who appeared in 83 games in Major League Baseball as a catcher, first baseman and pinch hitter for the Kansas City Athletics in 1966 and 1967. He threw right-handed, batted left-handed, and was listed as 6 feet 3 inches (1.91 m) tall and 200 pounds (91 kg).

Born in Pikeville, North Carolina, Talton attended East Carolina University and began his pro career in the San Francisco Giants' organization in 1959. Acquired by the Athletics in January 1965, he was in the midst of his eighth straight year in minor league baseball when he was recalled from Triple-A Vancouver in July 1966. He then spent the rest of 1966 and all of 1967 on the Kansas City roster, largely in pinch hitting roles. He was in the starting lineup for only six of his 83 MLB games, but batted .417 (1966) and .303 (1967) as a pinch hitter, with 20 total hits in 57 at bats (.351), including one pinch home run.

All told, he batted .295 in the majors; Talton's 33 hits included six doubles, two triples and two home runs. He returned to the minors in 1968 and retired after the following year, his eleventh in professional baseball.

Talton died on July 22, 2021, in Goldsboro, North Carolina, at the age of 82.
