= Jim Ollom =

American baseball player (born 1945)

- Pitcher
- Born: July 8, 1945 (age 81); Snohomish, Washington, U.S.
- Batted: Right Threw: Left

MLB debut
- September 3, 1966, for the Minnesota Twins

Last MLB appearance
- September 15, 1967, for the Minnesota Twins

MLB statistics
- Win–loss record: 0–1
- Earned run average: 5.00
- Strikeouts: 28
- Stats at Baseball Reference

Teams
- Minnesota Twins (1966–1967)

James Donald Ollom (born July 8, 1945) is an American former Major League Baseball player from Snohomish, Washington who pitched for the Minnesota Twins in 1966-1967.

Ollom was originally signed by the New York Yankees as an amateur free agent prior to the 1963 season. In 1966 he won 20 games for the Denver Bears of the Pacific Coast League, and earned a late season stint with the Twins. In 1967 he pitched in 21 games for Minnesota (19 games as a reliever and 2 games as a starter). In 35 innings pitched, he had a 5.40 ERA and his only decision was a loss.
