= Arlo Brunsberg =

American baseball player (born 1940)

- Catcher
- Born: August 15, 1940 (age 85); Fertile, Minnesota, U.S.
- Batted: Left Threw: Right

MLB debut
- September 23, 1966, for the Detroit Tigers

Last MLB appearance
- October 2, 1966, for the Detroit Tigers

MLB statistics
- Batting average: .333
- Home runs: 0
- Runs batted in: 0
- Stats at Baseball Reference

Teams
- Detroit Tigers (1966)

Arlo Adolph Brunsberg (born August 15, 1940) is an American former professional baseball player. A catcher born in Fertile, Minnesota, he appeared in two games in Major League Baseball for the Detroit Tigers in 1966, and forged a nine season (1962–1970) pro career. He batted left-handed, threw right-handed, and was listed as 6 feet (1.8 m) tall and 195 pounds (88 kg). He signed with Detroit after graduating from Concordia College (Moorhead, Minnesota), where he starred in baseball, football and basketball.

Brunsberg's MLB "cup of coffee" occurred at the end of his fifth season in the Tiger farm system. In his second and last big-league game, on the closing day of the Tigers' 1966 campaign, he registered his only hit in the majors, a double off eventual Baseball Hall of Famer Catfish Hunter.

After his playing career, Brunsberg spent three years, 1971–1973, as head baseball coach at North Dakota State University, then three decades as a teacher and high school baseball coach in Blaine, Minnesota.
