= Paul Dicken =

American baseball player (born 1943)

- Pinch hitter
- Born: October 2, 1943 (age 82); DeLand, Florida
- Batted: Right Threw: Right

MLB debut
- June 7, 1964, for the Cleveland Indians

Last MLB appearance
- September 13, 1966, for the Cleveland Indians

MLB statistics
- Batting average: .000
- At bats: 13
- Games played: 13
- Stats at Baseball Reference

Teams
- Cleveland Indians (1964, 1966)

Paul Franklin Dicken (born October 2, 1943) is an American former Major League Baseball player who played for two seasons. An outfielder in minor league baseball, he was exclusively a pinch hitter when he played for Major League Baseball's Cleveland Indians in 1964 and 1966. The 6 ft 5 in (1.96 m), 195 lb (88 kg) Dicken batted 13 times for the Indians, did not register a hit or a base on balls, and struck out six times.

In 344 minor league games, he batted .263 and hit 61 home runs.
