= Bill Short =

American baseball player (1937–2022)

- Pitcher
- Born: November 27, 1937; Kingston, New York, U.S.
- Died: February 2, 2022 (aged 84); Sarasota, Florida, U.S.
- Batted: Left Threw: Left

MLB debut
- April 23, 1960, for the New York Yankees

Last MLB appearance
- June 13, 1969, for the Cincinnati Reds

MLB statistics
- Win–loss record: 5–11
- Earned run average: 4.70
- Strikeouts: 71
- Stats at Baseball Reference

Teams
- New York Yankees (1960); Baltimore Orioles (1962, 1966); Boston Red Sox (1966); Pittsburgh Pirates (1967); New York Mets (1968); Cincinnati Reds (1969)

William Ross Short (November 27, 1937 – February 2, 2022) was an American professional baseball pitcher. During his 15-year pro career, he played all or parts of six seasons in Major League Baseball between 1960 and 1969.

A 5 ft 9 in (1.75 m), 170 lb (77 kg) left-hander, Short was originally signed by the New York Yankees in 1955. He made his major league debut for the Yankees in 1960 and played his final game with the Cincinnati Reds in 1969. In between, he appeared for the Baltimore Orioles, Boston Red Sox, Pittsburgh Pirates and New York Mets.

On July 1, 1966 against the Minnesota Twins, Short threw the only shutout of his MLB career, a six-hitter. In 73 career big-league games pitched, including 16 starts, he posted a 5–11 record and 4.73 earned run average, allowing 130 hits and 64 bases on balls in 1311/3 innings pitched. He had three complete games, two saves, and 64 strikeouts.

In 1959, Short was selected the Most Valuable Pitcher in the Triple-A International League after compiling a 17–6 (2.48) mark for the Richmond Virginians. He would win 13 or more games three more times during his long career in that Triple-A league, and in 2009 he was inducted into the International League Hall of Fame.

Short died on February 2, 2022.
