= John Miller (pitcher) =

American baseball player (1941–2020)

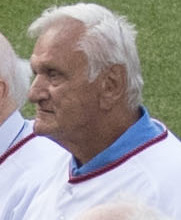
- Miller at Camden Yards in 2016
- Pitcher
- Born: May 30, 1941; Baltimore, Maryland, U.S.
- Died: June 5, 2020 (aged 79); Westminster, Maryland, U.S.
- Batted: Right Threw: Right

MLB debut
- September 22, 1962, for the Baltimore Orioles

Last MLB appearance
- May 1, 1967, for the Baltimore Orioles

MLB statistics
- Win–loss record: 12–14
- Earned run average: 3.89
- Strikeouts: 178
- Stats at Baseball Reference

Teams
- Baltimore Orioles (1962–1967)

Career highlights and awards
- World Series champion (1966)

John Ernest Miller (May 30, 1941 – June 5, 2020) was an American professional baseball player. He played in all or part of five seasons in Major League Baseball for the Baltimore Orioles between 1962 through 1967.

== Professional career ==
Miller was originally signed as an amateur free agent before the 1961 season by the Baltimore Orioles and pitched his first game as a Big Leaguer at age 21. He was part of the 1966 World Series championship team, although he did not appear in the postseason. Plagued with shoulder problems throughout his career, his contract was purchased from the Orioles by the New York Mets on May 10, 1967, but he never appeared in a major league game for them, spending the remainder of the season with the Triple-A Jacksonville Suns. After spending 1968 with the independent High Point-Thomasville Hi-Toms of the Carolina League, Miller retired.

== Personal life ==
Miller was born in Baltimore, Maryland. He grew up in the Irvington neighborhood (Southwest Baltimore) and graduated from Edmondson High School. After baseball, he became a Baltimore County firefighter.

Miller died on June 5, 2020.
