= Wally Bunker =

American baseball player (born 1945)

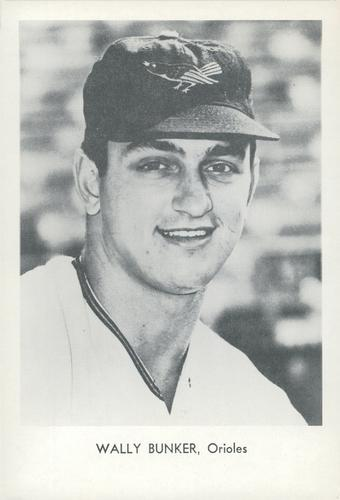
- Pitcher
- Born: January 25, 1945 (age 81); Seattle, Washington, U.S.
- Batted: Right Threw: Right

MLB debut
- September 29, 1963, for the Baltimore Orioles

Last MLB appearance
- May 26, 1971, for the Kansas City Royals

MLB statistics
- Win–loss record: 60–52
- Earned run average: 3.51
- Strikeouts: 569
- Stats at Baseball Reference

Teams
- Baltimore Orioles (1963–1968); Kansas City Royals (1969–1971)

Career highlights and awards
- World Series champion (1966)

Wallace Edward Bunker (born January 25, 1945) is an American former Major League Baseball pitcher. A right-hander, Bunker pitched for the Baltimore Orioles from 1963 to 1968 and Kansas City Royals from 1969 to 1971.

== Early life ==
Bunker pitched for the Capuchino High School varsity baseball team in San Bruno, California, in 1962 and 1963, as the team won the Mid-Peninsula League championships. He also played on the varsity basketball team. The Baltimore Orioles had ranked him and Dave Boswell as the two best pitching prospects in the country. Not able to afford giving each of them huge bonuses, the ballclub only signed Bunker after being disappointed by Boswell's performance in his senior year of high school.

== Professional career ==
=== Baltimore Orioles ===
==== 1964 ====
As a 19-year-old in 1964, Bunker won his first six starts of the season, the first of which was a 2–1 one-hitter over the Washington Senators. He became the ace of a staff that also featured Milt Pappas and Robin Roberts. Bunker finished the season 19–5. To date, the 19 wins are an Oriole rookie single-season record) with a 2.69 earned-run average and won The Sporting News American League Rookie pitcher of the Year Award. He also received the only first-place vote not won by Tony Oliva for the Rookie of the Year honors. That year, the Orioles fell short of the American League pennant, finishing in third place; the New York Yankees won their fifth consecutive pennant, finishing one game ahead of the Chicago White Sox and two games ahead of the Orioles.

So popular had Bunker become in his rookie season that Baltimore mayor Theodore McKeldin, prior to a June 17 game at Memorial Stadium, proclaimed the mound "Baltimore's Bunker Hill"–even christening it with a handful of earth from the actual Bunker Hill. Bunker then defeated the then-first place White Sox 6–1, the victory putting the Orioles in first place. Sixteen days later, he pitched his second one-hitter of the season, defeating the Kansas City Athletics 4–0, the lone hit being Rocky Colavito's fourth-inning double.

==== Later Oriole Years ====
After Bunker's rookie season, arm ailments — most likely torn tendons or ligaments of some kind, which often went undiagnosed in Bunker's era — in subsequent seasons prevented him from enjoying a 1964 sequel. A "sore arm" (which, according to Bunker, he incurred in late September 1964, on a cold night in Cleveland) during the 1965 season reduced him to a part-time starter afterwards. He posted a 10–8 record that year and a 10–6 record in 1966. In the latter year, the Orioles won the World Series in a four-game sweep of the defending champion Los Angeles Dodgers. In Game 3 of that Series, Bunker outdueled Claude Osteen with a six-hit, 1–0 shutout, which was sandwiched between shutouts by Jim Palmer and Dave McNally as the Orioles set a Series record by not allowing a run for 33 1/3 consecutive innings. (Moe Drabowsky pitched 6 2/3 scoreless innings in relief in Game One to begin the streak.)

=== Kansas City Royals ===
In 1968 the Kansas City Royals selected Bunker in the expansion draft, and he was their winningest pitcher in 1969 with a 12–11 record. On April 8 of that year, he threw the very first pitch in Kansas City Royals history. The Royals defeated the Minnesota Twins 4–3 in 12 innings, with Drabowsky (whom the Royals had also acquired from Baltimore in the expansion draft) gaining the victory in relief.

After the 1969 season, the arm troubles that limited Bunker to a part-time starter shortened his career. After slumping to 2–11 in 1970, he was released in May, 1971. Bunker had pitched his final major-league game at just 26 years of age.

In his career, Bunker won 60 games against 52 losses, with 569 strikeouts and a 3.51 earned-run average in 1,085 1/3 innings pitched. As a batter Bunker had 31 hits in 331 at-bats for a .094 batting average. Defensively, he recorded a .969 fielding percentage which was 16 points higher than the league average at his position.

Bunker's sinker was his most effective pitch in his short career. Mickey Mantle once referred to Bunker's sinker as the type of pitch "you could break your back on."

== Children's books author/illustrator ==
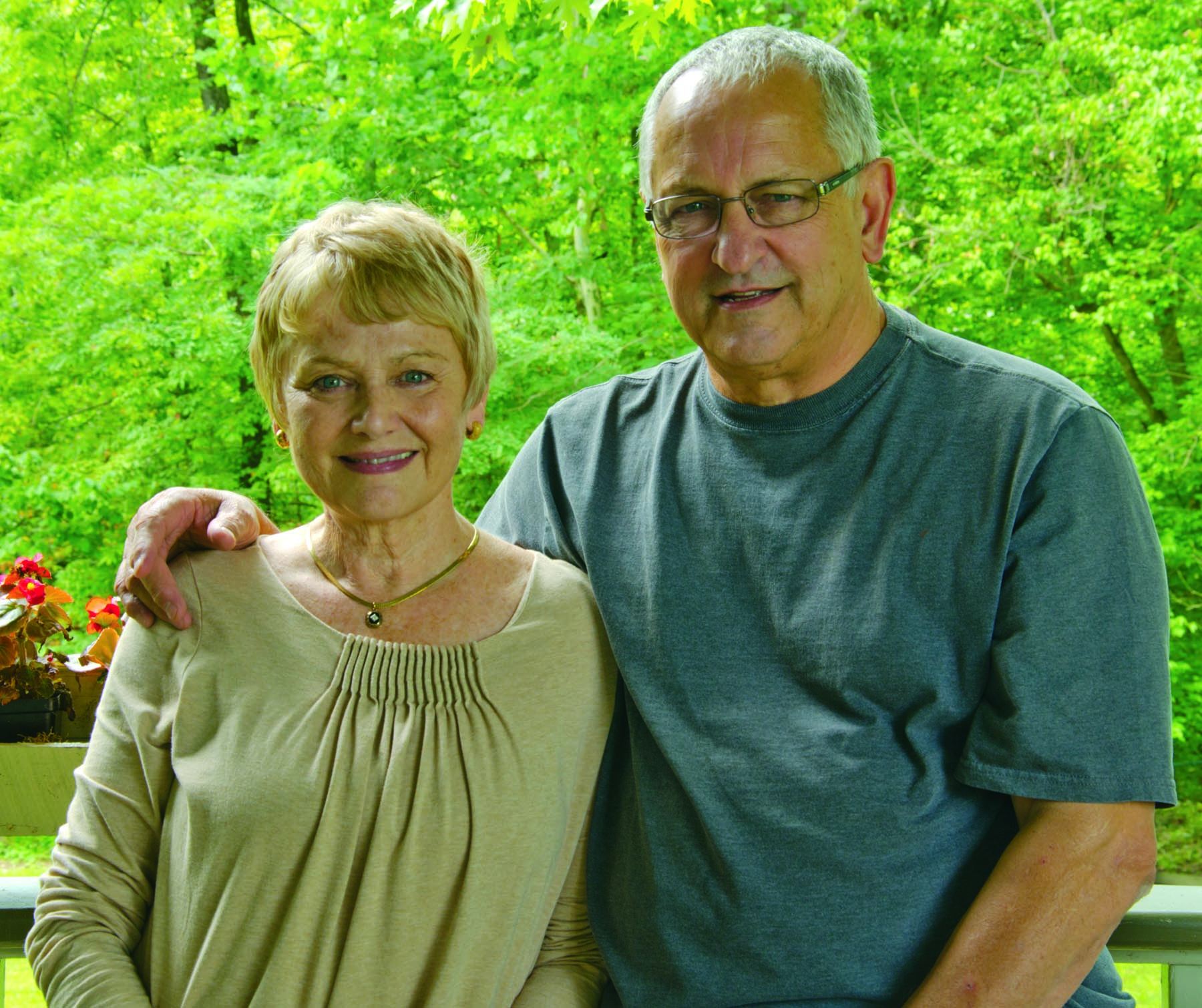
Wally Bunker and Kathy Bunker, Author Illustrators of Wal-De-Mar, Friends and Such children's books

Bunker and his wife Kathy were Artists in Residence at Palm Key Nature Getaway in Ridgeland, South Carolina. They began writing and illustrating children's literature under the "Wal-De-Mar, Friends and Such" collection. They published two books in 2015. A Lowcountry Tale Concerning Wal-De-Mar Wiggins introduces a bird born in South Carolina's Lowcountry. In I Am Me, the bird dreams of who he could be and realizes the value of being himself.

Bunker and Kathy live in Coeur d'Alene, Idaho.

== Books ==
- A Lowcountry Tale Concerning Wal-De-Mar Wiggins (2015)
- I Am Me 2015
