= Jack Aker =

American baseball player (born 1940)

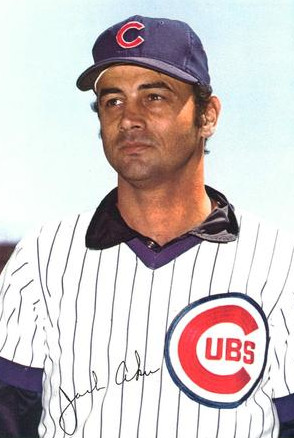
- Aker in 1973
- Pitcher
- Born: July 13, 1940 (age 86); Tulare, California, U.S.
- Batted: Right Threw: Right

MLB debut
- May 3, 1964, for the Kansas City Athletics

Last MLB appearance
- September 27, 1974, for the New York Mets

MLB statistics
- Win–loss record: 47–45
- Earned run average: 3.28
- Strikeouts: 404
- Saves: 124
- Stats at Baseball Reference

Teams
- Kansas City / Oakland Athletics (1964–1968); Seattle Pilots (1969); New York Yankees (1969–1972); Chicago Cubs (1972–1973); Atlanta Braves (1974); New York Mets (1974)

Jackie Delane Aker (born July 13, 1940) is an American former professional baseball relief pitcher. He played in Major League Baseball (MLB) for the Kansas City / Oakland Athletics, Seattle Pilots, New York Yankees, Chicago Cubs, Atlanta Braves, and New York Mets.

== Early life ==
Aker was born on July 13, 1940, in Tulare, California, and attended Mt. Whitney High School, located in Visalia, California. He pitched on the school's baseball team, and was named first-team all-Central Yosemite league (CYL) as a pitcher after his junior year in 1957. Mt. Whitney was CYL champion in 1957. Aker was All-CYL first-team again in 1958, this time as an outfielder. Mt. Whitney was CYL champion again in 1958.

As a high school senior in 1957, Aker was Mt. Whitney's player of the year as a running back on the school's undefeated football team. He was named CYL All-Star team captain. Aker originally was selected to play halfback for the Northern California team of high school all-stars in the July 1958 North-South Shrine Game in Los Angeles. He wound up as a starter at defensive right end in the game.

Aker next attended the College of Sequoias (1958-59), a junior college in Visalia, where he was a .300 hitter on the school's baseball team, and was a starting fullback on the football team.

Aker is of Potawatomi ancestry, and was later nicknamed "Chief" in his professional baseball career because of this.

== Professional baseball ==
=== Minor leagues ===
Kansas City Athletics' scout Lloyd Christopher signed Aker as amateur free agent on June 9, 1959, the team paying Aker a bonus in excess of $10,000.

After his initial season as an outfielder in the Nebraska State League, the A's moved him to pitcher in the Florida Instructional League during the winter of 1959-60. In March 1960, he reported to training camp for the Visalia A's of the Class-C California League among the team's pitchers. He started 26 games for Visalia (pitching only five in relief), with 13 complete games, three shutouts, but an 8–14 won–loss record and 4.47 earned run average (ERA). The A's promoted Aker to the Class-B Lewiston Broncs in 1961, where his record improved to 13–12, but he still had a 4.32 ERA, starting 21 of the 29 games in which he appeared.

In 1962, he was promoted to the Double-A Albuquerque Dukes, and had a 12–14 record and 5.26 ERA, starting the majority of the games in which he pitched. Married with two children, the 22-year old Aker started the 1963 season on the roster of the Triple-A Pacific Coast League's (PCL) Portland Beavers, but was then assigned to the now Single-A Lewiston Broncs of the Northwest League. Aker appeared in eight games (starting five) for the Broncs, with a 6–1 record, stellar 1.24 ERA, and pitched a one-hitter. Aker was promoted to the Beavers during the season, where he finished with a 4–3 record and a 3.00 ERA, but now pitching the majority of his games (18 of 26) as a relief pitcher. After the end of the Kansas City A's 1963 season, Aker was added to the team's roster.

Aker participated in spring training with the A's, but played the majority of the 1964 season with the Dallas Rangers of the PCL. He pitched all but two of his 44 games for the Rangers in relief. He had a 3–4 record and 2.63 ERA, with 64 strikeouts and only 22 bases on balls in 82 innings pitched. His 2.91 strikeout to walk ratio was the best of his entire career. He was called up to the A's in early May, and pitched 16.1 innings in nine relief appearances in the major leagues that year, with an 8.82 ERA. Aker made his major league debut for the Athletics on May 3, 1964, tossing 3 1/3 innings in relief while allowing three earned runs in an 8–7 win over the Minnesota Twins.

He began the 1965 season with the PCL's Vancouver Mounties, pitching all of his 35 games in relief. He was 6–3 with a 1.36 ERA, and 56 strikeouts in 66 innings. His 7.6 strikeouts per nine innings was the highest of his entire career. His 1.36 ERA led the PCL. Aker had improved over his two years as a relief pitcher by focusing on pitching to his strengths as a pitcher, rather than being focused on the hitter's strengths as a batter.

=== Major leagues ===
Aker made it to the majors as a side-arming sinkerballer, pitching for the Kansas City/Oakland Athletics (1964–68), Seattle Pilots (1969), New York Yankees (1969–72), Chicago Cubs (1972–73), Atlanta Braves (1974), and New York Mets (1974). During an 11-year baseball career, Aker compiled 47 wins, 404 strikeouts, a 3.28 earned run average, and 123 saves, an impressive total at the time.

==== Kansas City/Oakland Athletics ====
Aker was called up to the A's in July 1965, and finished the season with the A's. He pitched in 34 games, all in relief, with a 4–3 record and 3.16 ERA on a team that finished the season with a 59–103 record. On September 10, 1965, Aker pitched six innings of relief while allowing just one earned run and striking out three to earn the win in a 10–5 win over the Baltimore Orioles.

Aker’s first full major league season came in 1966 with the A's. It was also his best major league season. He pitched in 66 games, all in relief. He led all major league pitchers in games finished (57) and saves (32). He had an 8–4 record and 1.99 ERA, and finished 13th in American League most valuable player voting, on a 74–86 team. On September 7, 1966, Aker earned his 30th save of the season with 3 2/3 innings of shutout relief against the California Angels. His 32 saves were a major league record until 1970, when broken by Ron Perranoski's 34 saves with the Minnesota Twins. Aker was named 1966 AL Fireman of the Year by The Sporting News.

The 1967 A's season was notable for a rebellion by some of the players and manager Alvin Dark against team owner Charles O. Finley. Aker was the A's player representative to the players' union at the time. Finley had suspended pitcher Lew Krause. Other players on the team, including Aker and Ken Harrelson issued a written public statement against Finley's actions, believing the allegations against Krause were unfairly made and the suspension was unjust. Dark supported the players' position and Krause. In response, Finley fired Dark, fined Aker (for allegedly missing a curfew) and ultimately released Harrelson from the team (effectively making him a free agent).

During the height of the conflict, serving as the player representative Aker had to deal directly with Finley and others involved in the dispute (including lawyers, union executive director Marvin Miller and baseball commissioner William Eckert). (Ironically, Finley rehired Dark as the A's manager in 1974, after the A's 1973 World Series championship manager Dick Williams resigned because of Finley's mistreatment of A's player Mike Andrews.)

The team finished its final season in Kansas City, 62–99. Aker pitched 57 games in relief, his ERA ballooning to 4.30 and record falling to 3–8. On April 29, 1967, he pitched the last 8 1/3 innings of a 15-inning loss to the Boston Red Sox, striking out a career-high eight batters and allowing just two runs. Aker did not blame his poor 1967 performance on the Krause affair and conflict with Finley.

Aker relegated the 1967 dispute with Finley to the past in entering the 1968 season. However, he believed he was not given a chance to pitch in 1968. That season, the A's first year in Oakland and the first full seasons for future Hall of famer Reggie Jackson and four-time all-star Sal Bando, the team improved to 82–80. Both Aker and Krause remained on the team that season. Aker pitched 54 games in relief with 12 saves, a 4–4 record and 4.10 ERA. On April 24, 1968, in just the eighth baseball game ever played at the Oakland–Alameda County Coliseum, Aker pitched the last five innings, allowing no runs and earning the win in an 11-inning victory over the New York Yankees.

==== Seattle Pilots and New York Yankees ====
Major League baseball expanded its number of teams in 1969 to add the Kansas City Royals, Montreal Expos, San Diego Padres and Seattle Pilots. An expansion draft was held in 1968 to populate these teams from players left exposed to the draft from existing teams. After a series of run-ins with A's owner Charles O. Finley, Aker, the team's union player representative, was made available in the expansion draft for the 1969 season, and was picked up by the Seattle Pilots with the 24th pick. The team only existed one year in Seattle before becoming the Milwaukee Brewers, but were made famous in pitcher Jim Bouton's book, Ball Four.

On April 8, 1969, Aker earned a save in the first game in franchise history, a 4–3 win over the California Angels.

On May 20, Aker was traded to the Yankees for Fred Talbot. After the trade, he ran up a string of 33 consecutive scoreless innings, still a regular season Yankee record. Aker led the Yankees in saves that year (11) and finished both 1969 and 1970 with ERAs of 2.06, despite career-threatening back surgery in the intervening winter. In 1970, on a 93–69 Yankees team, he had 16 saves and teamed with closer Lindy McDaniel for 45 saves between them. He had a 2.59 ERA in 1971, with a 4–4 record, but only four saves on an 82–80 Yankees team. He had a bad back that affected his performance in 1971.

==== Chicago Cubs, Atlanta Braves and New York Mets ====
Aker remained a mainstay of the Yankee bullpen until 1972, when New York's acquisition of Sparky Lyle from Boston made Aker expendable. On May 17, he was traded to the Chicago Cubs for cash considerations. He had a 2.96 ERA and 17 saves for the Cubs to finish the season, and a 4.10 ERA with 12 saves in 1973. Aker was signed by the Atlanta Braves after the 1973 season. The Braves sold his rights to the New York Mets in June 1974, where he ended his career after the 1974 season. Aker pitched almost three seasons in the NL, and was standing in the bullpen feet away from where Braves’ teammate Hank Aaron's historic 715th home run landed on April 8, 1974.

=== Manager and coach ===
After his playing days ended, Aker managed in the minor leagues from 1975–85. He was hired by the New York Mets to manage the 1975 Visalia Mets, a Single-A team in the California League. From 1976-80, he managed the Single-A Lynchburg Mets of the Carolina League. He was twice named the Carolina League's manager of the year (1977-78). In 1981, the Mets promoted him to manager of the Triple-A Tidewater Tides of the International League.

He won the Governor's Cup (International League Championship) with the 1982 Tidewater Tides. But the Mets replaced him at Tidewater in the 1983 season with future Mets manager Davey Johnson. In 1983, he was the pitching coach for the Buffalo Bisons of the Double-A Eastern League, a Cleveland Indians' affiliate, and was named the team's manager in 1984. In 1985, he managed the Double-A Waterbury Indians of the Eastern League.

Aker was the Cleveland Indians pitching coach from late in the 1985 season to July 1987.

== Personal life ==
After Aker's professional playing and coaching career, he went into the field of teaching baseball skills to children. For 20 years Aker offered camps, clinics, and baseball instruction through his "Jack Aker Baseball" academy, which he founded in 1988. By 2004, he was teaching nearly 3,000 students a year, ranging from young children to adults over 35.

In 1997, he was honored by President Bill Clinton with a "Giant Steps Award" for his work teaching at-risk Native American children on Hopi, Navajo and Zuni reservations in Arizona and New Mexico.

== See also ==
- List of Major League Baseball annual saves leaders
- List of Major League Baseball leaders in games finished
