= Earl Wilson (baseball) =

American baseball player (1934–2005)

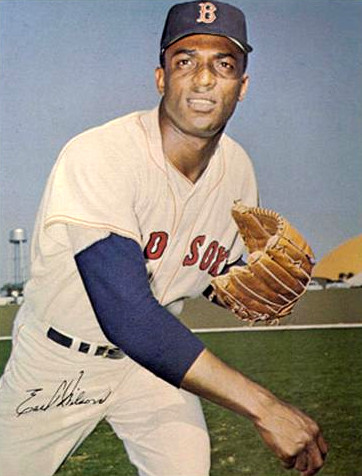
- Pitcher
- Born: October 2, 1934; Ponchatoula, Louisiana, U.S.
- Died: April 23, 2005 (aged 70); Southfield, Michigan, U.S.
- Batted: Right Threw: Right

MLB debut
- July 28, 1959, for the Boston Red Sox

Last MLB appearance
- September 22, 1970, for the San Diego Padres

MLB statistics
- Win–loss record: 121–109
- Earned run average: 3.69
- Strikeouts: 1,452
- Stats at Baseball Reference

Teams
- Boston Red Sox (1959–1960, 1962–1966); Detroit Tigers (1966–1970); San Diego Padres (1970)

Career highlights and awards
- World Series champion (1968); AL wins leader (1967); Pitched a no-hitter on June 26, 1962

Robert Earl Wilson (born Earl Lawrence Wilson) (October 2, 1934 – April 23, 2005) was an American professional baseball pitcher. He played all or part of eleven seasons in Major League Baseball (MLB) for the Boston Red Sox (1959–1960, 1962–1966), Detroit Tigers (1966–1970) and San Diego Padres (1970), primarily as a starting pitcher. Wilson batted and threw right-handed; he was born in Ponchatoula, Louisiana, and graduated from Greenville Park High School in Tangipahoa Parish.

In his eleven-season MLB career, Wilson posted a 121–109 record with 1,452 strikeouts and a 3.69 earned run average in 2051 2/3 innings pitched.

== Career ==
Wilson began his professional career as a catcher in 1953, although converted to become a pitcher the following year. As a 6 ft 3 in (1.91 m), 216 lb (98 kg)-pound pitcher, who relied on sliders and fastballs, Wilson made his Major League Baseball debut with the Red Sox on July 28, 1959, as their first black pitcher.

On June 26, 1962, at Fenway Park, Wilson no-hit the Los Angeles Angels 2–0 and helped his own cause with a home run off Bo Belinsky—himself a no-hit pitcher earlier that year, on May 5. (Wes Ferrell in 1931, Jim Tobin in 1944 and Rick Wise in 1971 are the only three other no-hit pitchers to homer in the same game; the latter of the three hit two home runs in pitching his no-hitter.)

Earl Wilson also became the first African American black major leaguer to pitch an American League no-hitter.

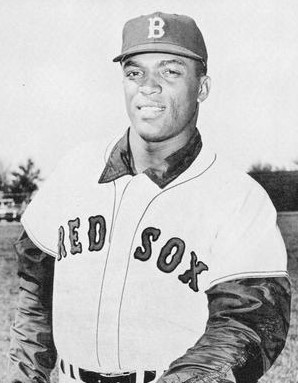
Wilson, circa 1965

In five-plus seasons, Wilson won 45 games for Boston with a high of 13 victories in 1963. He was traded to the Detroit Tigers in midseason of the 1966, and finished with a combined 18–11 record, a career-high in strikeouts with 200, and a 3.07 ERA.

His most productive season came in 1967, with a career-high 22 wins, tying Jim Lonborg for the American League lead.

In the 1968 World Series, when the Tigers defeated the St. Louis Cardinals in seven games, Wilson was part of a starting rotation which included 31-game winner Denny McLain, and Mickey Lolich, who won three games in the Series. Wilson started (and lost) Game 3 for the Tigers.

Wilson was known as much for his home run power as he was for his pitching. Originally a catcher, Wilson switched to pitching in 1953. According to the Elias Sports Bureau, Wilson hit 35 home runs in his career: 33 as a pitcher, two as a pinch hitter, two in one game (1965), and seven in a season twice, in 740 at-bats, he collected 144 hits for a .195 batting average with 95 runs, 111 RBI and drew 67 bases on balls. Only Wes Ferrell (37 HRs), Bob Lemon and Warren Spahn (35 each) and Red Ruffing (34) hit more home runs as pitchers, according to " ESB."

Wilson was purchased by the San Diego Padres in 1970 where he finished his career at the end of that season.

== Post-playing career ==
After retiring, Wilson founded an automotive parts company. In the 1980s, possibly into the early 1990s, he also was a high school physical education teacher and basketball coach at Coral Springs High School in Coral Springs, Florida.

Wilson died suddenly at age 70 as a result of a massive heart attack at his home in Southfield, Michigan, on April 23, 2005.

He was interred in Woodlawn Cemetery in Detroit.

== See also ==
- Black Aces, African-American pitchers with a 20-win MLB season
- List of Major League Baseball annual wins leaders
- List of Major League Baseball all-time leaders in home runs by pitchers
- List of Major League Baseball no-hitters

Preceded by Bo Belinsky	No-hitter pitcher June 26, 1962	Succeeded by Sandy Koufax
