= 1968 California Angels season =

Major League Baseball season

1968 California Angels
- League: American League
- Ballpark: Anaheim Stadium
- City: Anaheim, California
- Record: 67–95 (.414)
- League place: 8th
- Owner: Gene Autry
- General managers: Fred Haney, Dick Walsh
- Manager: Bill Rigney
- Television: KTLA
- Radio: KMPC (Buddy Blattner, Don Wells, Steve Bailey)
- Stats: ESPN.com; Baseball Reference

The 1968 California Angels season was the 8th season of the Angels franchise in the American League, the 3rd in Anaheim, and their 3rd season playing their home games at Anaheim Stadium. The Angels finished the season eighth in the American League with a record of 67 wins and 95 losses.

== Offseason ==
- October 9, 1967: Bill Skowron was released by the Angels.
- November 28, 1967: Elrod Hendricks was drafted from the Angels by the Baltimore Orioles in the 1967 rule 5 draft.
- November 29, 1967: Bill Kelso and Jorge Rubio were traded by the Angels to the Cincinnati Reds for Sammy Ellis.
- January 27, 1968: Paul Reuschel was drafted by the Angels in the 3rd round of the secondary phase of the 1968 Major League Baseball draft, but did not sign.
- Prior to 1968 season: Merritt Ranew was acquired from the Angels by the New York Yankees.

== Regular season ==
=== Season standings ===
American League
Team	W	L	Pct.	GB	Home	Road
Detroit Tigers	103	59	.636	—	56‍–‍25	47‍–‍34
Baltimore Orioles	91	71	.562	12	47‍–‍33	44‍–‍38
Cleveland Indians	86	75	.534	16½	43‍–‍37	43‍–‍38
Boston Red Sox	86	76	.531	17	46‍–‍35	40‍–‍41
New York Yankees	83	79	.512	20	39‍–‍42	44‍–‍37
Oakland Athletics	82	80	.506	21	44‍–‍38	38‍–‍42
Minnesota Twins	79	83	.488	24	41‍–‍40	38‍–‍43
California Angels	67	95	.414	36	32‍–‍49	35‍–‍46
Chicago White Sox	67	95	.414	36	36‍–‍45	31‍–‍50
Washington Senators	65	96	.404	37½	34‍–‍47	31‍–‍49

=== Record vs. opponents ===
1968 American League record Sources:
Team	BAL	BOS	CAL	CWS	CLE	DET	MIN	NYY	OAK	WAS
Baltimore	—	9–9	10–8	11–7	7–11	8–10	10–8	13–5	9–9	14–4
Boston	9–9	—	9–9	14–4	10–8	6–12	9–9	10–8	8–10	11–7
California	8–10	9–9	—	8–10	7–11	5–13	7–11	6–12	5–13	12–6
Chicago	7–11	4–14	10–8	—	5–13	5–13	10–8	6–12	10–8	10–8
Cleveland	11–7	8–10	11–7	13–5	—	6–12	14–4	10–8–1	6–12	7–10
Detroit	10–8	12–6	13–5	13–5	12–6	—	10–8	10–8–1	13–5–1	10–8
Minnesota	8–10	9–9	11–7	8–10	4–14	8–10	—	12–6	8–10	11–7
New York	5–13	8–10	12–6	12–6	8–10–1	8–10–1	6–12	—	10–8	14–4
Oakland	9–9	10–8	13–5	8–10	12–6	5–13–1	10–8	8–10	—	7–11
Washington	4–14	7–11	6–12	8–10	10–7	8–10	7–11	4–14	11–7	—

=== Notable transactions ===
- July 20, 1968: Woodie Held was traded by the Angels to the Chicago White Sox for Wayne Causey.

=== Roster ===
1968 California Angels
Roster
Pitchers: 25 Dennis Bennett; 43 George Brunet; 39 Tom Burgmeier; 31 Pete Cimino; 44 Rickey Clark; 32 Sammy Ellis; 24 Jack Hamilton; 17 Bill Harrelson; 37 Bob Heffner; 31 Steve Kealey; 34,47 Bobby Locke; 45 Jim McGlothlin; 47 Andy Messersmith; 41 Tom Murphy; 33 Marty Pattin; 19 Minnie Rojas; 31 Larry Sherry; 35 Jim Weaver; 38 Clyde Wright	Catchers: 30 Tom Egan; 48 Orlando McFarlane; 7 Buck Rodgers; 2 Tom Satriano; Infielders: 15 Wayne Causey; 4 Chuck Cottier; 11 Jim Fregosi; 15 Woodie Held; 26 Chuck Hinton; 29 Bobby Knoop; 15 Winston Llenas; 5 Don Mincher; 1 Aurelio Rodríguez; 42 Paul Schaal; 9 Jim Spencer	Outfielders: 28 Vic Davalillo; 9 Jimmie Hall; 10 Jay Johnstone; 8 Ed Kirkpatrick; 27 Bubba Morton; 3 Rick Reichardt; 6 Roger Repoz; 35 Jarvis Tatum; 12 Bobby Treviño	Manager: 18 Bill Rigney; Coaches: 22 Rocky Bridges; 23 Don Heffner; 20 Bob Lemon; 21 Mike Roarke

== Player stats ==
=== Batting ===
==== Starters by position ====
Note: Pos = Position; G = Games played; AB = At bats; H = Hits; Avg. = Batting average; HR = Home runs; RBI = Runs batted in

Pos	Player	G	AB	H	Avg.	HR	RBI
C	Buck Rodgers	91	258	49	.190	1	14
1B	Don Mincher	120	399	94	.236	13	48
2B	Bobby Knoop	152	494	123	.249	3	39
3B	Aurelio Rodríguez	76	223	54	.242	1	16
SS	Jim Fregosi	159	614	150	.244	9	49
LF	Rick Reichardt	151	534	136	.255	21	73
CF	Vic Davalillo	93	339	101	.298	1	18
RF	Roger Repoz	133	375	90	.240	13	54

==== Other batters ====
Note: G = Games played; AB = At bats; H = Hits; Avg. = Batting average; HR = Home runs; RBI = Runs batted in

Player	G	AB	H	Avg.	HR	RBI
Tom Satriano	111	297	75	.253	8	35
Chuck Hinton	116	267	52	.195	7	23
Paul Schaal	60	219	46	.210	2	16
Bubba Morton	81	163	44	.270	1	18
Ed Kirkpatrick	89	161	37	.230	1	15
Jimmie Hall	46	126	27	.214	1	8
Jay Johnstone	41	115	30	.261	0	3
Jim Spencer	19	68	13	.191	0	5
Chuck Cottier	33	67	13	.194	0	1
Jarvis Tatum	17	51	9	.176	0	2
Woodie Held	33	45	5	.111	0	0
Tom Egan	16	43	5	.116	1	4
Bobby Treviño	17	40	9	.225	0	1
Winston Llenas	16	39	5	.128	0	1
Orlando McFarlane	18	31	9	.290	0	2
Wayne Causey	4	11	0	.000	0	0

=== Pitching ===
==== Starting pitchers ====
Note: G = Games pitched; IP = Innings pitched; W = Wins; L = Losses; ERA = Earned run average; SO = Strikeouts

Player	G	IP	W	L	ERA	SO
George Brunet	39	245.1	13	17	2.86	132
Jim McGlothlin	40	208.1	10	15	3.54	135
Tom Murphy	15	99.1	5	6	2.17	56
Rickey Clark	21	94.1	1	11	3.53	60

==== Other pitchers ====
Note: G = Games pitched; IP = Innings pitched; W = Wins; L = Losses; ERA = Earned run average; SO = Strikeouts

Player	G	IP	W	L	ERA	SO
Sammy Ellis	42	164.0	9	10	3.95	93
Clyde Wright	41	125.2	10	6	3.94	71
Andy Messersmith	28	81.1	4	2	2.21	74
Dennis Bennett	16	48.1	0	5	3.54	36
Bill Harrelson	10	33.2	1	6	5.08	22

==== Relief pitchers ====
Note: G = Games pitched; W = Wins; L = Losses; SV = Saves; ERA = Earned run average; SO = Strikeouts

Player	G	W	L	SV	ERA	SO
Minnie Rojas	38	4	3	6	4.25	33
Tom Burgmeier	56	1	4	5	4.33	33
Marty Pattin	52	4	4	3	2.79	66
Bobby Locke	29	2	3	2	6.44	33
Jack Hamilton	21	3	1	2	3.32	18
Jim Weaver	14	0	1	0	2.38	8
Bob Heffner	7	0	0	0	2.25	3
Steve Kealey	6	0	1	0	2.70	4
Pete Cimino	4	0	0	0	2.57	2
Larry Sherry	3	0	0	0	6.00	2

== Awards and honors ==
1968 All-Star Game

- Jim Fregosi, starter, shortstop

== Farm system ==
Level	Team	League	Manager
AAA	Seattle Angels	Pacific Coast League	Joe Adcock
AA	El Paso Sun Kings	Texas League	Chuck Tanner
A	San Jose Bees	California League	Harry Dunlop and Del Rice
A	Quad Cities Angels	Midwest League	Fred Koenig and Tom Morgan
Rookie	Idaho Falls Angels	Pioneer League	Tom Sommers and Eddie Bressoud

LEAGUE CHAMPIONS: El Paso, Quad Cities

Records
Preceded by 1967	California Angels seasons 1968	Succeeded by 1969
