= 1967 California Angels season =

Major League Baseball season

1967 California Angels
- League: American League
- Ballpark: Anaheim Stadium
- City: Anaheim, California
- Record: 84–77 (.522)
- League place: 5th
- Owner: Gene Autry
- General manager: Fred Haney
- Manager: Bill Rigney
- Television: KTLA
- Radio: KMPC (Buddy Blattner, Don Wells, Steve Bailey)
- Stats: ESPN.com; Baseball Reference

The 1967 California Angels season was the 7th season of the Angels franchise in the American League, the 2nd in Anaheim, and their 2nd season playing their home games at Anaheim Stadium. The Angels finished the season fifth in the American League with a record of 84 wins and 77 losses, 7 1/2 games behind the AL Champion Boston Red Sox.

== Offseason ==
- October 18, 1966: Jimmy Piersall was released by the California Angels.
- November 28, 1966: Ramón Hernández was drafted from the Angels by the Atlanta Braves in the 1966 rule 5 draft.
- November 29, 1966: Mike White and Don Furnald (minors) were traded by the Angels to the Chicago Cubs for Chris Krug and Wayne Schurr.
- December 2, 1966: The Angels traded Dean Chance and a player to be named later to the Minnesota Twins for Don Mincher, Jimmie Hall, and Pete Cimino. The Angels completed the deal by sending Jackie Hernández to the Twins on April 10, 1967.
- December 14, 1966: Norm Siebern was traded by the Angels to the San Francisco Giants for Len Gabrielson.

== Regular season ==
The 1967 Angels broke from the past, trading their ace pitcher and 1964 Cy Young Award winner Dean Chance to the Twins. In exchange, they obtained power hitting first baseman Don Mincher. Mincher would be their first legitimate consistent power threat since Leon Wagner was traded after the 1963 season. The Angels also obtained outfielder Jimmie Hall, who had averaged 25 home runs per season for the Twins from 1963–66. The Angels counted on young pitchers Jim McGlothlin and Rickey Clark to pick up the slack for the departed Chance.

The 1967 Angels had the second best record in franchise history to date and ranked a franchise best to date 4th in the American League in attendance. Mincher chipped in 25 homers and Hall added 16 in 129 games. Former bonus baby Rick Reichardt finally started showing promise by batting .265 with 17 homers, while shortstop Jim Fregosi had another solid season, batting .290 and earning a Gold Glove. Second baseman Bobby Knoop also won a Gold Glove, and the Angels led the league in fielding percentage. The pitching staff was led by McGlothlin, who was named to the AL All-Star team, along with Clark and hard luck veteran George Brunet, who lost 19 games despite a 3.31 ERA. Relief pitcher Minnie Rojas had a remarkable season, with a league-leading 27 saves, winning 12 games in relief, and sporting a 2.52 ERA.

=== Season summary ===
The Angels, coming off an 80–82 record in 1966, started slowly. On May 31, they were 18–27 and 10 games out of first place. At that point, they began to jell, and after going 20–11 in June and 17–11 in July, they found themselves at 55–49. While this put them in fifth place, they were only 4 1/2 games out of first in what had become a five-team race between the Angels, Minnesota Twins, Detroit Tigers, Chicago White Sox, and the surprising Boston Red Sox.

On August 13, the Angels completed a 3-game sweep of the Red Sox. They were now only 1 1/2 games out of first as they embarked on a crucial road trip that included stops in Minnesota and Boston. The Angels lost 3 games to the Twins, and 3 games in Boston (in one of which Boston's Tony Conigliaro was severely beaned and almost killed by the Angels' Jack Hamilton). When they returned home, the Angels lost 3 out of 4 to the Tigers, and they entered September only 1 game over .500 and 8 games out of first.

They played well in September, going 17–11 to finish 84–77, but never got closer than 6 games out of first. However, they had a big influence on the tight American League pennant race as they beat the Tigers in Detroit in the last game of the season, enabling the Red Sox to win the pennant by 1 game.

=== Opening Day lineup ===
- José Cardenal, CF
- Jim Fregosi, SS
- Rick Reichardt, LF
- Don Mincher, 1B
- Jimmie Hall, RF
- Bobby Knoop, 2B
- Buck Rodgers, C
- Paul Schaal, 3B
- George Brunet, P

=== Season standings ===
American League
Team	W	L	Pct.	GB	Home	Road
Boston Red Sox	92	70	.568	—	49‍–‍32	43‍–‍38
Detroit Tigers	91	71	.562	1	52‍–‍29	39‍–‍42
Minnesota Twins	91	71	.562	1	52‍–‍29	39‍–‍42
Chicago White Sox	89	73	.549	3	49‍–‍33	40‍–‍40
California Angels	84	77	.522	7½	53‍–‍30	31‍–‍47
Washington Senators	76	85	.472	15½	40‍–‍40	36‍–‍45
Baltimore Orioles	76	85	.472	15½	35‍–‍42	41‍–‍43
Cleveland Indians	75	87	.463	17	36‍–‍45	39‍–‍42
New York Yankees	72	90	.444	20	43‍–‍38	29‍–‍52
Kansas City Athletics	62	99	.385	29½	37‍–‍44	25‍–‍55

=== Record vs. opponents ===
1967 American League record Sources:
Team	BAL	BOS	CAL	CWS	CLE	DET	KCA	MIN	NYY	WAS
Baltimore	—	10–8	6–11	7–11	9–9	3–15	10–8	8–10	13–5	10–8
Boston	8–10	—	10–8	8–10	13–5	11–7	12–6	7–11	12–6	11–7
California	11–6	8–10	—	7–11	14–4	8–10	14–4	7–11	9–9	6–12
Chicago	11–7	10–8	11–7	—	12–6	8–10	8–10	9–9	12–6	8–10
Cleveland	9–9	5–13	4–14	6–12	—	8–10	11–7	10–8	9–9	13–5
Detroit	15–3	7–11	10–8	10–8	10–8	—	12–6	8–10–1	10–8	9–9
Kansas City	8–10	6–12	4–14	10–8	7–11	6–12	—	8–10	7–11	6–11
Minnesota	10–8	11–7	11–7	9–9	8–10	10–8–1	10–8	—	12–6–1	10–8
New York	5–13	6–12	9–9	6–12	9–9	8–10	11–7	6–12–1	—	12–6
Washington	8–10	7–11	12–6	10–8	5–13	9–9	11–6	8–10	6–12	—

=== Notable transactions ===
- April 10, 1967: Jimmy Piersall was signed as a free agent by the Angels.
- May 6, 1967: Cotton Nash and cash were traded by the Angels to the Chicago White Sox for Bill Skowron.
- May 12, 1967: Jimmy Piersall was released by the Angels.
- June 8, 1967: Chris Krug was released by the Angels.
- June 15, 1967: Marcelino López and Tom Arruda (minors) were traded by the Angels to the Baltimore Orioles for Woodie Held.
- August 7, 1967: The Angels sent a player to be named later to the Houston Astros for Jim Weaver. The Angels completed the deal by sending Héctor Torres to the Astros on November 21.

=== Roster ===
1967 California Angels
Roster
Pitchers: 43 George Brunet; 32 Lew Burdette; 31 Pete Cimino; 44 Rickey Clark; 46 Jim Coates; 24 Jack Hamilton; 41 Bill Kelso; 47 Bobby Locke; 33 Marcelino López; 45 Jim McGlothlin; 17 Fred Newman; 19 Minnie Rojas; 37 Jorge Rubio; 49 Jack Sanford; 49 Curt Simmons; 39 Ken Turner; 35 Jim Weaver; 24 Nick Willhite; 38 Clyde Wright	Catchers: 30 Tom Egan; 8 Ed Kirkpatrick; 16 Hawk Taylor; 48 Orlando McFarlane; 7 Buck Rodgers; Infielders: 11 Jim Fregosi; 15 Woodie Held; 29 Bobby Knoop; 5 Don Mincher; 12 Aurelio Rodríguez; 2 Tom Satriano; 42 Paul Schaal; 14 Bill Skowron; 34 Don Wallace; 25 Johnny Werhas	Outfielders: 1 José Cardenal; 6 Len Gabrielson; 9 Jimmie Hall; 10 Jay Johnstone; 27 Bubba Morton; 4 Jimmy Piersall; 3 Rick Reichardt; 6 Roger Repoz; Other batters: 47 Jim Hibbs; 26 Moose Stubing	Manager: 18 Bill Rigney; Coaches: 23 Don Heffner; 22 Billy Herman; 20 Bob Lemon; 21 Mike Roarke

== Player stats ==
=== Batting ===
==== Starters by position ====
Note: Pos = Position; G = Games played; AB = At bats; H = Hits; Avg. = Batting average; HR = Home runs; RBI = Runs batted in

Pos	Player	G	AB	H	Avg.	HR	RBI
C	Buck Rodgers	139	429	94	.219	6	41
1B	Don Mincher	147	487	133	.273	25	76
2B	Bobby Knoop	159	511	125	.245	9	38
SS	Jim Fregosi	151	590	171	.290	5	96
3B	Paul Schaal	99	272	51	.188	6	20
LF	Rick Reichardt	146	498	132	.265	17	69
CF	José Cardenal	108	381	90	.236	6	27
RF	Jimmie Hall	129	401	100	.249	16	55

==== Other batters ====
Note: G = Games played; AB = At bats; H = Hits; Avg. = Batting average; HR = Home runs; RBI = Runs batted in

Player	G	AB	H	Avg.	HR	RBI
Jay Johnstone	79	230	48	.209	2	10
Tom Satriano	90	201	45	.224	4	21
Bubba Morton	80	201	63	.313	0	32
Roger Repoz	74	176	44	.250	5	20
Woodie Held	58	141	31	.220	4	17
Aurelio Rodríguez	29	130	31	.238	1	8
Bill Skowron	62	123	27	.220	1	10
Johnny Werhas	49	75	12	.160	2	6
Hawk Taylor	23	52	16	.308	1	3
Orlando McFarlane	12	22	5	.227	0	3
Len Gabrielson	11	12	1	.083	0	2
Ed Kirkpatrick	3	8	0	.000	0	0
Don Wallace	23	6	0	.000	0	0
Moose Stubing	5	5	0	.000	0	0
Jimmy Piersall	5	3	0	.000	0	0
Jim Hibbs	3	3	0	.000	0	0
Tom Egan	1	1	0	.000	0	0

=== Pitching ===
==== Starting pitchers ====
Note: G = Games pitched; IP = Innings pitched; W = Wins; L = Losses; ERA = Earned run average; SO = Strikeouts

Player	G	IP	W	L	ERA	SO
George Brunet	40	250.0	11	19	3.31	165
Jim McGlothlin	32	197.1	12	11	2.59	137
Rickey Clark	32	174.0	12	11	2.59	81
Jack Hamilton	26	119.1	9	6	3.24	74
Jorge Rubio	3	15.0	0	2	3.60	4
Marcelino López	4	9.0	0	2	9.00	6

==== Other pitchers ====
Note: G = Games pitched; IP = Innings pitched; W = Wins; L = Losses; ERA = Earned run average; SO = Strikeouts

Player	G	IP	W	L	ERA	SO
Clyde Wright	20	77.1	5	5	3.26	35
Jack Sanford	12	48.1	3	2	4.47	21
Nick Willhite	10	39.1	0	2	4.35	22
Curt Simmons	14	34.2	2	1	2.60	13
Jim Weaver	13	30.1	3	0	2.67	20
Fred Newman	3	6.1	1	0	1.42	0

==== Relief pitchers ====
Note: G = Games pitched; W = Wins; L = Losses; SV = Saves; ERA = Earned run average; SO = Strikeouts

Player	G	W	L	SV	ERA	SO
Minnie Rojas	72	12	9	27	2.52	83
Bill Kelso	69	5	3	11	2.97	91
Pete Cimino	46	3	3	1	3.26	80
Jim Coates	25	1	2	0	4.30	39
Lew Burdette	19	1	0	1	4.91	8
Ken Turner	13	1	2	0	4.15	6
Bobby Locke	9	3	0	2	2.33	7

== Awards and honors ==
All-Star Game

- Jim Fregosi
- Jim McGlothlin
- Don Mincher

Gold Glove Award

- Jim Fregosi, SS
- Bobby Knoop, 2B

== Farm system ==
Level	Team	League	Manager
AAA	Seattle Angels	Pacific Coast League	Chuck Tanner
AA	El Paso Sun Kings	Texas League	Rocky Bridges
A	San Jose Bees	California League	Harry Dunlop
A	Quad Cities Angels	Midwest League	Fred Koenig
Rookie	Idaho Falls Angels	Pioneer League	Tom Sommers

LEAGUE CHAMPIONS: San Jose

Records
Preceded by 1966	California Angels seasons 1967	Succeeded by 1968
