= Jorge Rubio (baseball) =

Mexican baseball player (1945–2020)

- Pitcher
- Born: April 23, 1945; Mexicali, Mexico
- Died: June 15, 2020 (aged 75); Mexicali, Mexico
- Batted: Right Threw: Right

MLB debut
- April 21, 1966, for the California Angels

Last MLB appearance
- May 1, 1967, for the California Angels

MLB statistics
- Win–loss record: 2–3
- Earned run average: 3.19
- Strikeouts: 31
- Stats at Baseball Reference

Teams
- California Angels (1966–1967)

Jorge Jesús Rubio Chávez (April 23, 1945 – June 15, 2020) was a Mexican professional baseball pitcher who played in Major League Baseball in 1966 and 1967.

Rubio pitched for the California Angels in seven games during the 1966 season. This included a complete game 2–0 victory over the visiting Cleveland Indians on October 2, the last game of the season, in which he struck out 15 batter. He also pitched in three games for the Angels in the 1967 season. Going into the 1967 season, he was in contention to make the team's starting rotation, but, following a leg injury that cost him over two weeks of spring training, he was surpassed by fellow rookie Rickey Clark.

After the 1967 season, Rubio was traded to the Cincinnati Reds with Bill Kelso for Sammy Ellis. That winter, Rubio pitched in Mexico and, in order to rest his tired right arm, pitched with his left arm in some games. He claimed that he had experimented as a switch pitcher in high school and could throw with "the same speed left-handed" but with less control. He continued using his left hand in spring training with the Reds in 1968 but said he planned to use his right hand regularly once it was sufficiently rested. He pitched briefly for a minor league baseball team in Indianapolis in 1968 before pitching for several team in the Mexican League to end his professional baseball career.

Rubio died on June 15, 2020.
