= Vic Davalillo =

Venezuelan baseball player (1939–2023)

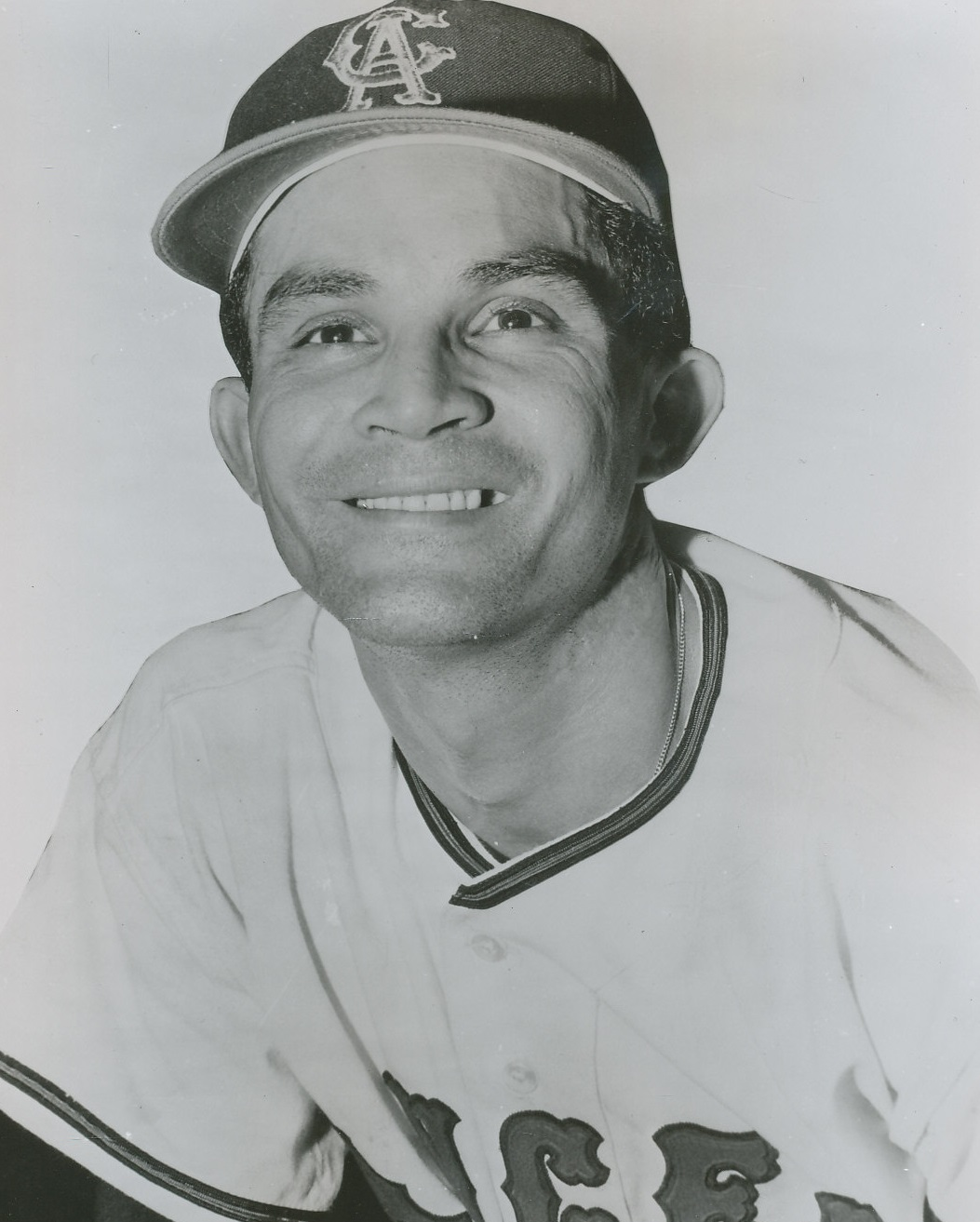
- Davalillo with the California Angels in 1968
- Outfielder
- Born: 31 July 1939; Cabimas, Zulia, Venezuela
- Died: 6 December 2023 (aged 84); Caracas, Venezuela
- Batted: Left Threw: Left

MLB debut
- April 9, 1963, for the Cleveland Indians

Last MLB appearance
- October 6, 1980, for the Los Angeles Dodgers

MLB statistics
- Batting average: .279
- Home runs: 36
- Runs batted in: 329
- Stats at Baseball Reference

Teams
- Cleveland Indians (1963–1968); California Angels (1968–1969); St. Louis Cardinals (1969–1970); Pittsburgh Pirates (1971–1973); Oakland Athletics (1973–1974); Los Angeles Dodgers (1977–1980)

Career highlights and awards
- All-Star (1965); 2× World Series champion (1971, 1973); Gold Glove Award (1964)

Member of the Venezuelan

Baseball Hall of Fame
- Induction: 2003

Víctor José Davalillo Romero (31 July 1939 – 6 December 2023) was a Venezuelan professional baseball player. He played in Major League Baseball (MLB) and the Mexican League as an outfielder from 1963 to 1982.

Davalillo (pronounced da-va-LEE-yo) played in Major League Baseball (MLB) for the Cleveland Indians (1963–68), California Angels (1968–69), St. Louis Cardinals (1969–70), Pittsburgh Pirates (1971–73), Oakland Athletics (1973–74), and Los Angeles Dodgers (1977–80) as an outfielder.

Davalillo, who batted and threw left-handed, was a leadoff hitter known for his speedy baserunning and capable defense. He was a fan favorite during his years with the Indians, and became a valuable utility player later in his career. He was also recognized as a superb pinch hitter.

Davalillo also had an exceptional career in the Venezuelan Winter League, where he is the all-time leader in total base hits and career batting average. He played for 30 years in the U.S., Mexico, and his homeland, compiling more than 4,100 base hits total. He was inducted into the Venezuelan Baseball Hall of Fame as part of its inaugural class in 2003.

== Early life ==
Although many baseball references show Davalillo's birthplace as Cabimas, Venezuela, in 2006 he told a biographer that he was born in Churuguara, Falcón on 31 July 1939. Other sources have given his date of birth as 30 July 1939, or sometime in 1936. His family moved to Cabimas a few days after he was born. He grew up in the Costa Oriental region on Lake Maracaibo. His older brother, Pompeyo Davalillo, played briefly for the Washington Senators in 1953.

== Professional career ==
Davalillo began his career as a pitcher. He signed a contract as an amateur free agent with the Cincinnati Reds in 1958. He was sold to the Indians organisation in 1961 and moved up the ladder to Jacksonville, their Triple-A club in the International League. Davalillo won the first batting title in the Jacksonville Suns history with a .346 batting average in 1962.

=== Cleveland Indians ===
Davalillo became the eighth Venezuelan to play in Major League Baseball when he joined the Indians in 1963 as their leadoff hitter and center fielder. By mid-June, he was hitting for a .304 batting average and was receiving consideration for the American League Rookie of the Year Award when, he was hit by a pitch by Hank Aguirre and suffered a broken wrist. He returned from the injury to lead the Indians in hitting with a .292 along with a career-high 7 home runs in 90 games however, after the injury, he was never the same hitter against left handed pitching. In October, he was named to the 1963 Topps All-Star Rookie Team. The following season, Davalillo finished second in the league in fielding percentage among center fielders and was named as a recipient of the 1964 American League Gold Glove Award. He was the first left-handed throwing outfielder to win an American League Gold Glove Award (Vada Pinson won the 1961 National League Gold Glove Award as a left-handed outfielder).

In 1965, Davalillo led the league in batting at mid-season with a .345 batting average, earning him a place as the starting center fielder for the American League team in the 1965 All-Star Game. He ended the 1965 season with a .301 batting average, third-best in the American League behind Tony Oliva and Carl Yastrzemski, the only other players to break the .300 mark that year. Davalillo had an off year in 1966, and the Indians began to use him in a platoon role, playing him when they faced right-handed pitchers. In 1967, he hit for a .302 average against right-handed pitchers but, only managed a .188 average against left handers, for a .287 average overall.

=== California Angels ===
Davalillo was batting .239 with 12 runs batted in (RBI) when he was traded from the Indians to the California Angels for Jimmie Hall before the trade deadline on 15 June 1968. He rebounded to lead the Angels with a .298 batting average after the trade, finishing the season with a .277 average overall, the sixth highest average in the American League. In an era dominated by pitching, Yastrzemski was the only player in the American League to hit for an average higher than .300 in 1968.

=== St. Louis Cardinals ===
In January 1969, Davalillo suffered a nervous breakdown while he was in Venezuela to play in the Venezuelan Winter League. He began the 1969 season hitting for only a .155 average in 33 games and on 30 May, he was traded to the St. Louis Cardinals for Jim Hicks. In his first National League at bat on 1 June, 1969, Davalillo hit a three-run home run. He also made two appearances as a relief pitcher for the Cardinals in 1969 but failed to retire any batters. He is one of 14 pitchers in Major League history to have posted an infinite ERA, and the only one to have pitched in more than one game.

Davalillo became a utility player and highly effective pinch hitter with the Cardinals in 1970. He was originally credited with 24 pinch hits in 1970, which broke the National League record set by Sam Leslie (1932) and tied by Red Schoendienst (1962). He also ostensibly tied the major-league single-season mark, also set by Dave Philley in 1961. The total was subsequently corrected to 23, but while Davalillo was still credited with holding it, it was broken in 1976 by José Morales. One of the previous National League record holders was also his manager in 1970: Red Schoendienst. Davalillo ended the season with a .311 average and 33 runs batted in.

=== Pittsburgh Pirates ===
The Cardinals traded Davalillo along with Nelson Briles to the Pittsburgh Pirates for Matty Alou and George Brunet in January 1971. He continued in his role as a utility player, facing mostly right-handed pitchers and playing all three outfield positions and as a first baseman. Davalillo ended the year with a .285 batting average, helping the Pirates clinch the National League Eastern Division title. The Pirates went on to defeat the San Francisco Giants in the 1971 National League Championship Series before winning the 1971 World Series against the Baltimore Orioles. In 1972, he continued to be a valuable role player, hitting for a career-high .318 batting average in 117 games, helping the Pirates win the Eastern Division pennant, before they lost to the Cincinnati Reds in the 1972 National League Championship Series.

=== Oakland Athletics ===
In July 1973, the Pirates sold Davalillo to the Oakland Athletics, who were in the midst of a pennant race with the Kansas City Royals. The Athletics eventually won the American League West Division and faced the Baltimore Orioles in the 1973 American League Championship Series. Davalillo had five hits in eight at-bats for a .625 batting average during the championship series, including a crucial RBI triple in the deciding Game 5.

The Athletics then went on to defeat the New York Mets in the 1973 World Series. Davalillo played in six of the seven games, starting twice in center field and going 1-for-11 altogether.

After appearing in 17 games for the Athletics in the 1974 season, Davalillo was released on 30 May.

=== Los Angeles Dodgers ===
The Los Angeles Dodgers, seeking an experienced reserve, purchased Davalillo's contract in August 1977. As a pinch hitter and a defensive substitute, he posted a .313 batting average in 24 games for the Dodgers in 1977, helping them win the National League West Division crown. Davalillo thus became the first major-leaguer to play for three different teams in the League Championship Series (Pittsburgh in 1971–1972, Oakland in 1973 and Los Angeles in 1977).

Davalillo's pinch-hitting talent played a prominent role in the Dodgers' come-from-behind victory in Game 3 of the 1977 National League Championship Series against the Philadelphia Phillies. Trailing the Phillies 5–3 with 2 outs in the 9th inning, he spearheaded a three-run rally by surprising the Phillies defense with a perfectly executed drag bunt. Manny Mota drove Davalillo home with a double, then scored on a single by Davey Lopes to tie the game. The Dodgers eventually won the game and went on to win Game 4 to clinch the National League championship.

In the 1977 World Series against the New York Yankees, Davalillo made three pinch-hitting appearances, driving home one run with a single as the Dodgers lost the series in six games.

At the age of 42 in 1978, Davalillo hit for a .312 average as a pinch hitter for the Dodgers as they once again claimed the National League pennant before losing to the New York Yankees for a second consecutive year in the 1978 World Series.

Davalillo remained on manager Tommy Lasorda's squad to start the 1979 season, but in mid-June, he returned to Triple-A ball for the first time in 17 years. He rejoined the big club in September, going 4-for-10.

=== Mexican League ===
Davalillo played his first three seasons in the Mexican League after being released by the Athletics in 1974. He was the league's top hitter with a .384 batting average in 1977. He continued to pitch on occasion.

Davalillo returned to Mexico after the Dodgers released him following the 1979 season. He hit .394 in 94 games, and the Dodgers reached out for him again. He played for the Dodgers' Triple-A team in Albuquerque and was called up at age 44 for his last six major league at-bats in September and October 1980.

In 1981, Davalillo played in his 40 final games in the Mexican League. His career south of the border continued, however, in the little-known Liga Nacional. This circuit was started in 1981 by ANABE (Asociación Nacional de Beisbolistas), a Mexican players' association. Davalillo played in 1982 for Lechugueros de León. If Liga Nacional records still exist, they would be extremely difficult to find, but apparently Davalillo hit .360 in 124 games for the Lettuce Growers. In 1986 he was invited to join another Liga Nacional club, Tuzos de Zacatecas, but the circuit folded before he played for the Gophers.

=== Venezuelan career ===
Davalillo kept playing in the Venezuelan Winter League until the age of 50. All told, he played in 30 seasons between 1957 and 1987, the vast majority of them (19) for the Leones del Caracas (1957–58 through 1974–75, 1986–87) and another ten with the Tigres de Aragua (1976–77 through 1985–86). He also played one season for "Tibuleones" de Portuguesa (1975–76)

Davalillo retired after appearing in the 1987 Caribbean Series.

- 1959–60: Liga Occidental Zuliana (postseason reinforcement)
- 1983: Liga Centro Occidental
- 1985–86: Liga de Verano (as player-manager)
- 1985: Liga Instruccional "Angel Millán"

== Death ==
Davalillo died in Caracas from complications of surgery on 6 December 2023, at the age of 84.

== Career statistics ==
In a 16-year major-league career, Davalillo played in 1,458 games, accumulating 1,122 hits in 4,017 at bats for a .279 career batting average along with 36 home runs, 329 runs batted in, a .315 on-base percentage, 509 runs, 160 doubles, 37 triples, and 125 stolen bases. He finished his career at center field with a .988 fielding percentage, ranking him 61st among major league center fielders since 1913.

As a pinch hitter in MLB, he recorded 95 hits in 367 at-bats (.259) with 5 home runs and 48 RBI.

In the Venezuelan Winter League, he set lifetime league records that still stand in batting average (.325), hits (1,505), games played (1,280), at-bats (4,633), runs (668), doubles (196), runs batted in (483) and career seasons (30). Beside this, he won four batting titles and set record in hits (100) in a season.

The 2019 biography Vitico al Bate credits him with 4,158 total base hits as a professional:

- Along with 1,505 regular-season hits in the Venezuelan winter league, 131 in that league's postseason and 21 more in All-Star games
- Along with 1,122 in the major leagues, 10 more in MLB postseason play and one in the All-Star Game
- Along with 379 in the U.S. minors, three in a minor-league All-Star game
- 829 in Mexico
- 130 in other Venezuelan leagues
- 27 in the Caribbean Series and Inter-American Series

Note: This total may not account for U.S. minor-league postseason games. Note also that La Enciclopedia del Beisbol Mexicano credits Davalillo with 782 in the Mexican League. Uncertainty exists around totals in the Liga Nacional.

== Honors ==
In 1987, the ballpark in Cabimas, Zulia, was renamed Estadio Víctor Davalillo. The Most Valuable Player award in the Venezuelan Professional Baseball League is also named after him.

In 2003, Davalillo was selected to the inaugural class of the Venezuelan Baseball Hall of Fame and Museum.

The Venezuelan winter league played its 2019–20 season in Davalillo's honor.

In March 2022, a youth baseball program in Caracas called "Escuela de Beisbol Menor Víctor Davalillo" began operations.

The book "Portrait of a Franchise: An Intimate Look at Cleveland Indians Baseball during the Rockin' Sixties" includes a chapter about Davalillo.

== See also ==
- List of players from Venezuela in Major League Baseball
- List of Gold Glove Award winners at outfield
