= Sammy Ellis =

American baseball player (1941–2016)

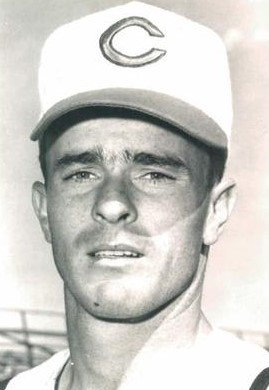
- Pitcher
- Born: February 11, 1941; Youngstown, Ohio, U.S.
- Died: May 13, 2016 (aged 75); Temple Terrace, Florida, U.S.
- Batted: Left Threw: Right

MLB debut
- April 14, 1962, for the Cincinnati Reds

Last MLB appearance
- June 8, 1969, for the Chicago White Sox

MLB statistics
- Win–loss record: 63–58
- Earned run average: 4.15
- Strikeouts: 677
- Stats at Baseball Reference

Teams
- As player: Cincinnati Reds (1962–1967); California Angels (1968); Chicago White Sox (1969); As coach: New York Yankees (1982–1984, 1986); Chicago White Sox (1989–1991); Chicago Cubs (1992); Seattle Mariners (1993–1994); Boston Red Sox (1996); Baltimore Orioles (2000)

Career highlights and awards
- All-Star (1965)

Samuel Joseph Ellis (February 11, 1941 – May 13, 2016) was an American professional baseball pitcher. He played in Major League Baseball (MLB) for the Cincinnati Reds, California Angels, and Chicago White Sox. Ellis was an MLB All-Star in 1965. After retiring as a player, he served as a pitching coach, and is credited with developing Yankees' pitcher Dave Righetti as their star relief pitcher during most of the 1980s.

== Early life and college career ==
Ellis was born on February 11, 1941, in Youngstown, Ohio. He played one year of college baseball at Mississippi State University (MSU) for the Mississippi State Bulldogs. At Mississippi State, he lettered one year (1961) with a pitching record of 12–7, leading the team in strikeouts (73) and innings pitched (57 2/3). He was named to MSU's Athletics Hall of Fame in 2012. During his one year at MSU, he struck out 19 batters in one game and 16 in another.

== Professional career ==
=== Cincinnati Reds ===
Ellis was signed by the Cincinnati Reds as an amateur free agent in 1961, with a $50,000 signing bonus.

==== Minor league career ====
In 1961, the Reds assigned him to the Single-A Columbia Reds of the South Atlantic (Sally) League. He had a 10–3 win–loss record and 1.89 earned run average (ERA). He pitched 10 complete games and five shutouts, with 129 strikeouts in 114 innings pitched. He was fifth in the Sally League in strikeouts; third in ERA for pitchers throwing more than 100 innings; and third in strikeouts per nine innings pitched (10.2) behind future Major League pitchers Joe Moeller and Mickey Lolich.

He was with the Reds in spring training in 1962, and began the season with the Reds. Ellis made his major league debut as a starting pitcher on April 14, 1962. He gave up 3 earned runs in 2.1 innings (and seven runs total), and lost to the San Francisco Giants and Don Larsen. He pitched 5.1 innings in relief in his next appearance, giving up only one run. His first victory came on April 24, when he walked 11 batters in five innings, but only allowed one hit and one run against the expansion New York Mets.

After pitching in two more games for the Reds in 1962, he was assigned to the Triple-A San Diego Padres of the Pacific Coast League (PCL). He had a 12–6 record, with a 3.53 ERA, 10 complete games, four shutouts and 162 strikeouts (second in the PCL) in 171 innings pitched. On August 14, 1962, he pitched a no-hit no-run game against the Tacoma Giants. The Reds called him up in September, and he pitched in three more games, including an eight-inning victory over the Philadelphia Phillies.

He spent the 1963 season with the Padres, going 12–10 with a 2.63 ERA (second best in the PCL among pitchers with over 100 innings pitched), striking out 192 batters (best in the PCL) in 192 innings.

==== Major league career ====
Ellis rejoined the major league club in 1964 as a reliever, starting only five of the 52 games in which he appeared. He finished the season with a 10–3 record, a 2.57 ERA, and threw fewer walks in those 52 games (28) than he did in 1962 in 8 games (29). He had 14 saves (tied for fifth in the National League), two complete games, and 125 strikeouts in 122.1 innings pitched. He was 16th in National League Most Valuable Player voting that year.

In 1965, the Reds made the 24-year old Ellis a starter, and he arguably had the best season of his career. Ellis was selected to the National League All-Star team for the only time in his career. He won 22 games, while losing only 10. He pitched 15 complete games and two shutouts, while posting an ERA of 3.79. He led the Major Leagues with 111 earned runs allowed, pitching in 263.2 innings, with 183 strikeouts. His average of 6.2 strikeouts per nine innings, however, was the lowest of his major or minor league career to date.

In 1966, Ellis developed a sore arm and never had another winning season. His ERA ballooned to 5.29. His walk total was down in 1966, but he finished the season with a 12–19 record, and also led the National League in home runs allowed (35) and the Major Leagues again in earned runs allowed (130). He remained part of the starting pitching rotation in 1967 and brought his ERA back down under 4.00, but he was 8–11, and struck out only 80 batters in 175.2 innings. His 4.1 strikeouts per nine innings was the worst of his career; less than half of the 9.2 ratio from his 1964 rookie season just three years earlier.

In his five seasons with the Reds, he was 54–45, with a 4.13 ERA, 16 saves and 569 strikeouts.

=== California Angels, Chicago White Sox, and return to minor leagues ===
After the 1967 season, on November 29, 1967, Ellis was traded to the California Angels for pitchers Bill Kelso and Jorge Rubio. He played in California for one season, where his role was mixed. He started 24 games, but also worked some games in relief and notched two saves. He was 9–10 with a 3.95 ERA and 93 strikeouts in 164 innings pitched.

On January 20, 1969, Ellis was traded to the Chicago White Sox for right fielder Bill Voss and minor leaguer Andy Rubilotta. Ellis had only pitched in 10 games, with an 0–3 record and 5.83 ERA when he was traded again in June, this time to the Cleveland Indians for pitcher Jack Hamilton. However, he was sent to the minor leagues without ever playing for the Indians, who assigned him to the Portland Beavers of the PCL, where he went 4–8 with a 4.41 ERA.

He played with the Tulsa Oilers in 1970, a St. Louis Cardinals' Triple-A affiliate, and the Birmingham A's in 1971, but was unable to make it back to the majors. He initially decided to retire in May 1970, telling Tulsa manager Warren Spahn he could no longer pitch effectively. He had pitched in only seven games for Spahn, going 0–4, with a 6.55 ERA. Ellis came back and played Double-A baseball for Birmingham in the Oakland A's farm system in 1971, going 11–15, with a 3.72 ERA in 208 innings. This was his final professional season as a player.

== Coaching career ==
After retiring, Ellis worked as a Major League pitching coach for a dozen seasons, having stints with the New York Yankees (1982–84; 1986), Chicago White Sox (1989–91), Chicago Cubs (1992), Seattle Mariners (1993–94), Boston Red Sox (1996) and Baltimore Orioles (2000). He also served as a minor league pitching coordinator for the Red Sox and Reds. Working under owner George Steinbrenner, he was pitching coach on three separate occasions for the Yankees, having been fired by Steinbrenner three times and brought back twice. When the Orioles were looking into hiring Ellis, former White Sox manager Jeff Torborg told them Ellis was the best pitching coach he had ever seen.

Sinkerball pitcher Tommy John credited Ellis with helping him work out some problems with his delivery in 1982. After watching John throw for 40 to 50 minutes a day for several days, Ellis observed, "I always recall seeing you pitch with your hand laid back like you're gonna throw a pie." John adjusted his delivery accordingly and began pitching better.

Ellis was also instrumental in converting Yankees' starter Dave Righetti into a relief pitcher in 1984, even though Righetti had success as a starter going into that season. Ellis was concerned about Righetti's longevity as a starting pitcher because of arm troubles Righetti had experienced, and saw the potential for Righetti to replace future Hall of Fame relief pitcher Goose Gossage, who had left the team after the 1983 season. Righetti went on to have eight consecutive seasons for the Yankees with 24 or more saves; and in 1986 he led all Major League pitchers with 46 saves. In 1986 and 1987, he won the American League Rolaid Relief Man Award. Righetti recorded a career total of record 252 saves, and after retirement became a pitching coach for nearly two decades with the San Francisco Giants, following in his mentor's footsteps.

== Death ==
Ellis was a long time resident of Temple Terrace, Florida, where he died in hospice care from cancer on May 13, 2016, at the age of 75. He was survived by his wife, two children, ten grandchildren and one great-grandchild. After his death, the Yankees held a moment of silence, while Ellis's image was displayed on the videoboard at Yankee Stadium.

Preceded by Dyar Miller	Chicago White Sox pitching coach 1989–1991	Succeeded by Jackie Brown
Preceded by Phil Roof	Chicago Cubs bullpen coach 1993	Succeeded by Tony Muser
Preceded by Dan Warthen	Seattle Mariners pitching coach 1993–1994	Succeeded by Bobby Cuellar
Preceded by Al Nipper	Boston Red Sox pitching coach 1996	Succeeded by Joe Kerrigan
Preceded by Bruce Kison	Baltimore Orioles pitching coach 2000	Succeeded by Mark Wiley
