= Ken Turner (baseball) =

American baseball player (1943–2016)

- Pitcher
- Born: August 17, 1943; Framingham, Massachusetts, U.S.
- Died: December 22, 2016 (aged 73); Temecula, California, U.S.
- Batted: Right Threw: Left

MLB debut
- June 11, 1967, for the California Angels

Last MLB appearance
- July 16, 1967, for the California Angels

MLB statistics
- Win–loss record: 1–2
- Earned run average: 4.15
- Strikeouts: 6
- Stats at Baseball Reference

Teams
- California Angels (1967)

Kenneth Charles Turner (August 17, 1943 – December 22, 2016) was an American pitcher in Major League Baseball who played in 13 games for the California Angels during the 1967 season. Listed at 6 feet 2 inches (1.88 m), 190 pounds (86 kg), he batted right handed and threw left handed.
