= 1965 Major League Baseball All-Star Game =

1965 American baseball competition

	1	2	3	4	5	6	7	8	9	R	H	E
National League	3	2	0	0	0	0	1	0	0	6	11	0
American League	0	0	0	1	4	0	0	0	0	5	8	0
- Date: July 13, 1965
- Venue: Metropolitan Stadium
- City: Bloomington, Minnesota
- Managers: Gene Mauch (PHI); Al López (CWS)
- MVP: Juan Marichal (SF)
- Attendance: 46,706
- Television: NBC
- TV announcers: Jack Buck and Joe Garagiola
- Radio: NBC
- Radio announcers: Herb Carneal and Bob Prince

The 1965 Major League Baseball All-Star Game was the 36th midseason exhibition between the all-stars of the American League (AL) and the National League (NL), the two leagues comprising Major League Baseball. The game was played on July 13, 1965, at Metropolitan Stadium in Bloomington, Minnesota, home of the Minnesota Twins of the American League. The game resulted in a 6–5 victory for the NL.

== Game summary ==
Traditionally, the managers of the winning pennant baseball teams of the previous year would have managed their respective leagues. However, with the firing of 1964 Yankees manager Yogi Berra, and the resignation of '64 Cardinals manager Johnny Keane (who then managed the Yankees), the second place managers (Al López of the White Sox and Gene Mauch of the Phillies) would manage their respective teams. In the National League, there had been a tie for second place, but Reds manager Fred Hutchinson had died in November 1964, making it unnecessary to break the tie.

After only five batters, the National League owned a 3–0 lead. Willie Mays hit a leadoff home run to left field off Milt Pappas, followed by a Willie Stargell single and a two-run Joe Torre homer.

Stargell's two-run homer in the second inning off Mudcat Grant made it 5–0. The NL was coasting until a four-run fifth inning against Jim Maloney, which included a pair of two-run homers by Dick McAuliffe and Harmon Killebrew, tying the game at 5-all.

The winning run scored in the seventh versus Sam McDowell on a walk to Mays, single by Hank Aaron, ground out by Roberto Clemente and infield hit by Ron Santo. Saving the game for the NL with two innings of relief was Bob Gibson, who, with Tony Oliva in scoring position after a ninth-inning double, struck out Killebrew and Joe Pepitone to end the game.

Attendance was announced as 46,706.

NL Starter Juan Marichal was named the game's MVP.

== National League roster ==
The National League roster included 14 future Hall of Famers.

=== Pitchers ===
Throws	Pitcher	Team	Notes
P	Don Drysdale	Dodgers
P	Sammy Ellis	Reds
P	Turk Farrell	Astros
P	Bob Gibson	Cardinals
P	Sandy Koufax	Dodgers
P	Jim Maloney	Reds
P	Juan Marichal	Giants	starter, MVP
P	Bob Veale	Pirates

=== Position players ===
Position	Player	Team	Notes
C	Johnny Edwards	Reds
C	Joe Torre	Braves	starter
1B	Ernie Banks	Cubs	starter
1B	Ed Kranepool	Mets
2B	Cookie Rojas	Phillies
2B	Pete Rose	Reds	starter
3B	Richie Allen	Phillies	starter
3B	Ron Santo	Cubs
SS	Leo Cárdenas	Reds
SS	Maury Wills	Dodgers	starter
OF	Hank Aaron	Braves	starter
OF	Johnny Callison	Phillies
OF	Roberto Clemente	Pirates
OF	Willie Mays	Giants	starter
OF	Frank Robinson	Reds
OF	Willie Stargell	Pirates	starter
OF	Billy Williams	Cubs

=== Coaching staff ===
Position	Manager	Team
Manager	Gene Mauch	Phillies
Coach	Bobby Bragan	Braves
Coach	Dick Sisler	Reds

== American League roster ==
The American League roster included 7 future Hall of Famers.

=== Pitchers ===
Throws	Pitcher	Team	Notes
P	Eddie Fisher	White Sox
P	Mudcat Grant	Twins
P	Bob Lee	Angels
P	Sam McDowell	Indians
P	John O'Donoghue	Athletics
P	Milt Pappas	Orioles	starter
P	Pete Richert	Senators
P	Mel Stottlemyre	Yankees

=== Position players ===
Position	Player	Team	Notes
C	Earl Battey	Twins	starter
C	Bill Freehan	Tigers
C	Elston Howard	Yankees
1B	Harmon Killebrew	Twins	starter
1B	Joe Pepitone	Yankees	Replaced Skowron
1B	Moose Skowron	White Sox	injured
2B	Félix Mantilla	Red Sox	starter
2B	Bobby Richardson	Yankees
3B	Max Alvis	Indians
3B	Brooks Robinson	Orioles	starter
SS	Dick McAuliffe	Tigers	starter
SS	Zoilo Versalles	Twins
OF	Rocky Colavito	Indians	starter
OF	Vic Davalillo	Indians	starter
OF	Jimmie Hall	Twins
OF	Willie Horton	Tigers	starter
OF	Al Kaline	Tigers
OF	Mickey Mantle	Yankees	injured
OF	Tony Oliva	Twins	Replaced Mantle
OF	Carl Yastrzemski	Red Sox

=== Coaching staff ===
Position	Manager	Team
Manager	Al López	White Sox
Coach	Don Gutteridge	White Sox
Coach	Sam Mele	Twins

== Game ==
=== Starting lineups ===
National League				American League			
Order	Player	Team	Position	Order	Player	Team	Position
1	Willie Mays	Giants	CF	1	Dick McAuliffe	Tigers	SS
2	Hank Aaron	Braves	RF	2	Brooks Robinson	Orioles	3B
3	Willie Stargell	Pirates	LF	3	Harmon Killebrew	Twins	1B
4	Richie Allen	Phillies	3B	4	Rocky Colavito	Indians	RF
5	Joe Torre	Braves	C	5	Willie Horton	Tigers	LF
6	Ernie Banks	Cubs	1B	6	Felix Mantilla	Red Sox	2B
7	Pete Rose	Reds	2B	7	Vic Davalillo	Indians	CF
8	Maury Wills	Dodgers	SS	8	Earl Battey	Twins	C
9	Juan Marichal	Giants	P	9	Milt Pappas	Orioles	P

=== Umpires ===
Position	Umpire
Home Plate	John Stevens (AL)
First Base	Lee Weyer (NL)
Second Base	Lou DiMuro (AL)
Third Base	Billy Williams (NL)
Left Field	Bill Valentine (AL)
Right Field	John Kibler (NL)

=== Line score ===
Tuesday, July 13, 1965 1:00 pm (CT) at Metropolitan Stadium in Bloomington, Minnesota
Team	1	2	3	4	5	6	7	8	9	R	H	E
National League	3	2	0	0	0	0	1	0	0	6	11	0
American League	0	0	0	1	4	0	0	0	0	5	8	0
WP: Sandy Koufax (1-0) LP: Sam McDowell (0-1) Sv: Bob Gibson (1); Home runs: NL: Willie Mays (1), Joe Torre (1), Willie Stargell (1); AL: Dick McAuliffe (1), Harmon Killebrew (1)
