= Zoilo Versalles =

Cuban baseball player (1939–1995)

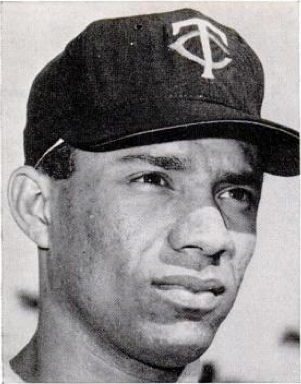
- Versalles in 1963
- Shortstop
- Born: December 18, 1939; Vedado, Cuba
- Died: June 9, 1995 (aged 55); Bloomington, Minnesota, U.S.
- Batted: Right Threw: Right

Professional debut
- MLB: August 1, 1959, for the Washington Senators
- NPB: July 19, 1972, for the Hiroshima Toyo Carp

Last appearance
- MLB: September 28, 1971, for the Atlanta Braves
- NPB: October 7, 1972, for the Hiroshima Toyo Carp

MLB statistics
- Batting average: .242
- Home runs: 95
- Runs batted in: 471

NPB statistics
- Batting average: .189
- Home runs: 4
- Runs batted in: 10
- Stats at Baseball Reference

Teams
- Washington Senators / Minnesota Twins (1959–1967); Los Angeles Dodgers (1968); Cleveland Indians (1969); Washington Senators (1969); Atlanta Braves (1971); Hiroshima Toyo Carp (1972)

Career highlights and awards
- 2× All-Star (1963, 1965); AL MVP (1965); 2× Gold Glove Award (1963, 1965); Minnesota Twins Hall of Fame

Zoilo Casanova Versalles Rodriguez (Spanish pronunciation: [ˈsojlo βeɾˈsaʝes]; December 18, 1939 – June 9, 1995), nicknamed "Zorro", was a Cuban professional baseball player. He played as a shortstop in Major League Baseball, most notably for the Minnesota Twins/Washington Senators. He was the catalyst who led the 1965 Twins to their first World Series after moving from Washington to Minnesota. The same year he also won the American League Most Valuable Player award.

== Early career ==
Versalles was born in the Vedado neighborhood of Havana, Cuba and he had difficulty adjusting to life in the U.S., due largely to the language barrier and his fear of failure, leaving him eternally homesick for his native Cuba. Versalles was signed as an amateur free agent by the Washington Senators prior to the 1958 season and was assigned to the Elmira Pioneers in the Class D New York–Penn League where he held his own and hit .292 in 124 games. The following spring, he went north with the Senators and made his major league debut on August 1, 1959. However, he was obviously overmatched and after hitting .153 with 15 strikeouts in 59 at-bats, Versalles was sent back down and spent the rest of the season with the Fox Cities Foxes in the Class B Illinois–Indiana–Iowa League, hitting .278 with 9 home runs. In 1960 Versalles split time between Washington and AAA Charleston trying to grow as a player and work through a stereotype that he was too sure of himself and was thus incapable of taking instruction. Although he hit .278 at Charleston with 8 home runs, 50 RBI and 24 stolen bases, he committed 42 errors and had only a .940 fielding percentage.

== Minnesota Twins ==
In 1961, the year the Senators moved to Minneapolis/St. Paul, Minnesota to become the Minnesota Twins, Versalles came to the majors to stay. Although his glove continued to be average at best, Versalles hit well enough to stay in the lineup, finishing the season with a .280 average, 7 home runs, 53 RBI and 16 stolen bases. Versalles' 1961 Topps card (#21) actually listed his first name as ″Zorro″, a nickname frequently used early in his career by media, fans and even club officials. The following season, Versalles played in 160 games and despite his batting average dropping to .240, he hit 17 home runs (third most for American League shortstops behind Detroit Tiger Chico Fernandez and New York Yankee Tom Tresh who both hit 20) and 67 RBI. Versalles led the league in assists with 501 and lowered his errors from 30 to 26, and got a smattering of MVP votes (finishing 21st). In 1963, Versalles raised his batting average to .261 and led the league in triples (13) and was voted to his first All-Star team. Starting in the July 9 game, Versalles singled and was hit by a pitch in two plate appearances before being lifted for Chicago White Sox shortstop Luis Aparicio. Although Versalles received his first Gold Glove award in 1963, he was still erratic in the field as his five errors in a July 5 double header against the Baltimore Orioles and season total of 30 errors attests. In 1964, Versalles had another solid season, hitting .259 with 20 home runs (second for AL shortstops behind Detroit's Dick McAuliffe), 64 RBI, and 14 stolen bases and again led the league in triples with 10.

Under the tutelage of Twins' third base coach Billy Martin, Versalles put it all together during his 1965 MVP season and led the American League in plate appearances (728), at-bats (666), runs scored (126), doubles (45), triples (12), extra-base hits (76) and total bases (308), and was second in assists (487) and third in stolen bases (27). He was a near-unanimous winner of the MVP award, receiving 19 of 20 first-place votes. The remaining first-place vote went to teammate and fellow Cuban Tony Oliva. He also led the league and set career highs in both strikeouts (122) and errors (39), which underlined his career-long struggles both at the plate and in the field in these areas. Versalles was named to his second All-Star team for the July 13 game (played in his home park, Bloomington, Minnesota's Metropolitan Stadium) along with five fellow Twins (first baseman Harmon Killebrew, catcher Earl Battey, pitcher Mudcat Grant and outfielders Jimmie Hall and Tony Oliva), but went hitless with a walk in two plate appearances after subbing for starter Dick McAuliffe in the sixth inning. Before the World Series began, Versalles was pictured on the cover of the October 4 issue of Sports Illustrated and was featured in the article which discussed the Twins' chances against possible National League opponents. In the Series against the NL champion Los Angeles Dodgers, Versalles started all seven games, hit .286 with his only home run and all four RBI coming in the lopsided Game 1 win, but it was not enough as the Twins lost to the Dodgers four games to three.

Following his MVP and World Series runner-up season, the team gave Versalles a raise to $40,000 annually. His performance almost immediately declined, as he hit only .249 in 137 games with an across-the-board drop in his offensive production. Despite this, he continued to have memorable moments such as on June 9, in the seventh inning of a game against the Kansas City Athletics. Versalles was one of five Twins players to hit home runs (along with Killebrew, Don Mincher, Oliva and Rich Rollins). These five home runs still stand as a major league record for the most home runs in a single inning. In July, he was treated for a hematoma in his back which put him on the disabled list for a short time, cost him playing time the following season, and led to a lifelong condition. Twins owner Calvin Griffith said that Versalles was prescribed painkillers for his back but his unfamiliarity with English language and culture led him to take improper doses, which contributed to his decline.

Versalles's life was chronicled in the biography The Kid from Cuba: Zoilo Versalles, published in 1967.

== Decline and retirement ==
Following his continuing struggles at the plate, which only accented his inconsistent glove (leading the American League in errors 1965–1967), the Twins finally parted ways on November 28, 1967, when he was traded to the Dodgers along with Mudcat Grant for John Roseboro, Ron Perranoski and Bob Miller. After one season with the Dodgers, in which he finished fourth in league in errors and hit only .196, he was exposed to the 1968 Major League Baseball expansion draft and was the 10th selection of the San Diego Padres. He never suited up for the expansion Padres as he was sent to the Cleveland Indians on December 2 to complete an October 29 trade that sent first baseman Bill Davis to San Diego.

Improving slightly over his previous year at the plate, Versalles was hitting .226 in 72 games when on July 26, 1969, he was purchased by the new Washington Senators. With this trade, Versalles became one of only nine players to don the uniforms of both the original and expansion Senators teams, with the others being Don Mincher, Camilo Pascual, Pedro Ramos, Johnny Schaive, Roy Sievers, Hal Woodeshick, Rudy Hernández, and Héctor Maestri. Although he hit .267 in limited action with the Senators and was invited back for spring training in 1970, he was released on April 6. Following a year playing in the Mexican League for Gómez Palacio, he was purchased by the Atlanta Braves on May 31, 1971, and he finished his major league career hitting .191 in 66 games. After being released by the Braves in December, he played in Japan in 1972 for the Hiroshima Toyo Carp.

For his career, Versalles had a batting average of .242 (.252 during his six years with the Twins) with 1,046 hits, 564 runs, 86 homers, 401 RBI, and 84 stolen bases in 1,065 games. During his five-year peak (1961–1965), Versalles led all AL shortstops with 73 home runs.

Baseball statistician/historian Bill James points out that Versalles' MVP season makes him the player with the fewest career win shares (134) to win an MVP award. While it may be true that Versalles could be considered a one-year MVP flash in the pan, he led the league in multiple offensive categories and was a near-unanimous selection. He also led the league in VORP (52.4), a stat that more accurately measures a player's overall production, and WAR (7.6), which includes a player's defensive value with his offensive production. At the time, most of the talk was not about whether or not he was deserving of the MVP, but whether teammate Tony Oliva should actually have been the winner. Oliva's .321 batting average and 98 RBI were much higher, his strikeouts were less than half, and his home run and stolen base totals nearly equaled Versalles. Versalles went down in history as the first Latin American player to be named most valuable player, and he is one of only five Twins to win the MVP (along with teammate Killebrew, Rod Carew, and more recent Twins Joe Mauer and Justin Morneau) and one of only three Twins to top the league in WAR (along with Carew and Mauer).

== After baseball ==
Versalles returned to the Minneapolis area following his year in Japan, but found it virtually impossible to make a living, partly because he had never learned English and partly because of the lingering effects of a back injury he had suffered while running out a ground ball with the Dodgers in 1968.

Versalles signed with the Minnesota Goofy's, a professional softball team, and played for the team in their 1977 American Professional Slow Pitch Softball League (APSPL) season. They played their home games at Midway Stadium in St. Paul, Minnesota.

Afterwards, holding a series of menial jobs, he lost his house to foreclosure and was eventually forced to sell his MVP trophy, his All-Star rings, and his Gold Gloves. In addition to his back problems he suffered two heart attacks, underwent stomach surgery and was sustained solely by disability and Social Security payments. He was found dead in his home in Bloomington, Minnesota, on June 9, 1995. An autopsy revealed that Versalles died from arteriosclerotic heart disease, or hardening of the arteries. Versalles was survived by his wife Maria, six daughters and several grandchildren.

Versalles was elected to the Twins Hall of Fame in 2006.

== See also ==
- List of Major League Baseball annual runs scored leaders
- List of Major League Baseball annual doubles leaders
- List of Major League Baseball annual triples leaders
