= Dean Chance =

American baseball player (1941–2015)

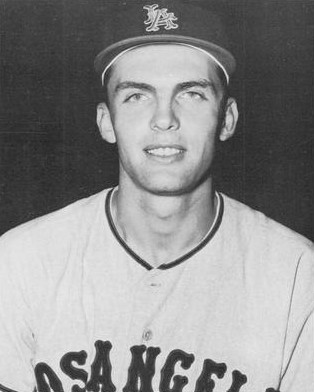
- Pitcher
- Born: June 1, 1941; Wooster, Ohio, U.S.
- Died: October 11, 2015 (aged 74); Wooster, Ohio, U.S.
- Batted: Right Threw: Right

MLB debut
- September 11, 1961, for the Los Angeles Angels

Last MLB appearance
- August 9, 1971, for the Detroit Tigers

MLB statistics
- Win–loss record: 128–115
- Earned run average: 2.92
- Strikeouts: 1,534
- Stats at Baseball Reference

Teams
- Los Angeles / California Angels (1961–1966); Minnesota Twins (1967–1969); Cleveland Indians (1970); New York Mets (1970); Detroit Tigers (1971)

Career highlights and awards
- 2× All-Star (1964, 1967); Cy Young Award (1964); AL wins leader (1964); AL ERA leader (1964); Pitched a no-hitter on August 25, 1967; Angels Hall of Fame

Wilmer Dean Chance (June 1, 1941 – October 11, 2015) was an American professional baseball player. A right-handed pitcher, he played in 11 Major League Baseball seasons for the Los Angeles / California Angels, Minnesota Twins, Cleveland Indians, New York Mets and Detroit Tigers. With a touch of wildness and the habit of never looking at home plate once he received the sign from his catcher, Chance would turn his back fully towards the hitter in mid-windup before spinning and unleashing a good fastball, sinker or sidearm curveball.

In 1964, Chance became at the time the youngest pitcher to win the Cy Young Award when, as a member of the Los Angeles Angels, he led the American League in wins (20), innings pitched (278 1/3) and earned run average (1.65—as of 2026, a franchise record) and was third in the A.L. in strikeouts. He pitched 11 shutouts (also a franchise record as of 2026) that season, winning five of those by a 1–0 score. At the time, only one Cy Young Award was given in all of MLB; since 1967, separate awards have been given in the AL and the National League. Chance's Cy Young Award was the third in a string of five consecutive Cy Young Awards won by a pitcher from a Los Angeles–based team. The others were won by Dodger pitchers: Don Drysdale in 1962 and Sandy Koufax in 1963, 1965, and 1966.

== Baseball career ==
Chance attended Northwestern High School in West Salem, Ohio, and starred on the baseball team and basketball teams (leading the team to a 1958 state title), but baseball is where Chance would shine. During his high school years, he set several state records which still stand including a 52–1 career record, 20 wins in a season, 32 straight wins, eight no-hitters in a season (in both his junior and senior years), and 17 no-hitters total. He also led the Huskies to the Class A state semifinals in 1958 and a championship in 1959 (and pitching every inning of every postseason tournament game).

Following high school, Chance signed with the Baltimore Orioles (for a $30,000 bonus and $12 Greyhound bus ticket) prior to the start of the 1959 season as an amateur free agent. After signing, he was assigned to the Bluefield Orioles in the class-D Appalachian League where he went 10–3 with a 2.94 ERA. In 1960, he went 12–9 for Fox Cities Foxes in class-B Illinois–Indiana–Iowa League. On December 14, 1960, Chance was drafted by the Washington Senators as the 48th pick in the 1960 AL expansion draft. Immediately following the draft, Chance was traded by the Senators to the Los Angeles Angels for outfielder Joe Hicks. He pitched most of 1961 for the Dallas-Fort Worth Rangers, going 9–12, before making his major league debut on September 11, 1961, at the age of 20. Chance finished the season 0–2 with a 6.87 ERA in five games, but was in the majors to stay.

Chance had an outstanding rookie campaign in 1962, winning 14 games with an ERA of 2.96 and finishing tied for third in AL Rookie of the Year voting with Bernie Allen and Dick Radatz (behind fellow Angel Buck Rodgers and winner Tom Tresh). The 1962 campaign was notable for the Angels as Chance and fellow phenom Bo Belinsky teamed on both the mound and in the Hollywood social circles, much to the enjoyment of the Los Angeles beat writers and the consternation of manager Bill Rigney and the rest of the Angels' front office. Although he lost 18 games in 1963, he finished with a 3.19 ERA in 248 innings. The pair were inseparable and often roomed together, some saying so that the Angels' would only have to mind one bad room – at least when they were in their room after curfew (which was not often). After his 1964 season in which he won the Cy Young Award and was elected to his first All-Star Game, Chance went 15–10 in 1965 and 12–17 in 1966, despite a respectable ERA of 3.08. After the 1966 season, the Angels, a weak hitting team desperate for power and looking to shed one of their problem children, shipped Chance and infielder Jackie Hernández to the Minnesota Twins on December 2 in a trade that netted them outfielder Jimmie Hall, slugging first baseman Don Mincher, and relief pitcher Pete Cimino.

Chance responded by winning 20 games for the Twins in 1967, leading the AL in games started (39), complete games (18) and innings pitched (283 2/3). On August 6 of that year, he pitched a rain-shortened, five-inning perfect game against the Red Sox at Metropolitan Stadium in Bloomington, Minnesota. He also pitched a 2–1 no-hitter against the Cleveland Indians on August 25 with the Indians scoring their sole run in the first inning on two walks, an error, and a wild pitch. Chance later said that umpire Ed Runge's wide strike zone had a lot to do with him keeping the Indians off the basepaths. The Twins nearly won the 1967 pennant, but Chance was outdueled in the season's final game, at Fenway Park, by Boston's Jim Lonborg, chasing Chance with 5 runs in the sixth despite getting only one ball out of the infield, and the Red Sox emerged as surprise league champions — with Lonborg winning the 1967 AL Cy Young trophy in the process. The trade helped both teams and Chance as the Angels rose to fifth place with an 84–77 record in 1967, the Twins were in it until the season's final game, and Chance was voted to his second all-star team and won the Sporting News AL Comeback Player of the Year award.

The 1968 campaign saw Chance put up a lackluster 16–16 record (echoing the Twins' 79–83 finish), but saw him notch career lows in hits and walks per 9 innings (6.9 and 1.9 respectively), and career highs in innings (292), strikeouts (234), and strikeouts per 9 innings (7.9). Due to his strong numbers, Chance had more than a decent chance at again winning 20 games, but the Twins offense let him down in 1968, scoring two runs or fewer in 17 of his 22 starts (games in which Chance himself posted an ERA of 2.55). In the games in which the Twins scored at least three runs, Chance posted a 13–4 record. Despite his strong season, owner Calvin Griffith, well known for being "thrifty", tried to cut Chance's salary by $9,000. Chance held out prior to the 1969 season and was successful in having his salary cut by "only" $5,000. However, 1968 was his last big year before his career rapidly declined. From 1969 to 1971, he won only 18 games. In 1969, he was plagued by a back injury caused by rushing to get into shape following his holdout and pitched only 88 1/3 innings. On December 10, 1969, the Twins shipped Chance, third baseman (and future New York Yankees star) Graig Nettles, infielder Ted Uhlaender, and pitcher Bob Miller to the Cleveland Indians for relief pitcher Stan Williams and future Boston Red Sox star Luis Tiant. The trade was a disaster for the Twins as Nettles immediately blossomed and hit 26 home runs for the 1970 Indians and Tiant, the key to the trade, was released after only one injury-plagued season.

Chance split the 1970 season between the Indians, for whom he pitched a 9–8 record with a 4.28, and the New York Mets (after being purchased from the Indians on September 18). Chance was traded again on March 30, 1971, this time to the Detroit Tigers along with reliever Bill Denehy for minor league pitcher Jerry Robertson. Used largely out of the bullpen, Chance finished his career with a 4–6 record in 31 games.

His career record over 11 seasons (1961–71) and 406 games pitched was 128 wins, 115 losses and an ERA of 2.92. He was a notoriously weak batsman in the days prior to the designated hitter, garnering only 44 hits in 662 at bats, for a batting average of .066. Chance's batting average is the lowest ever recorded by any major league player with at least 300 plate appearances; he also struck out 420 times in his 662 at-bats. Baseball author Bill James named Chance, along with Ron Herbel as the worst hitting pitchers of the 1960s.

== Retirement ==
Chance retired to a 300-acre ranch 3 miles (4.8 km) from his boyhood farm During the 1970s and 1980s Chance acted as a midway barker and operated games of skill at carnivals and fairs and was one of the most successful operators, eventually employing 250 people and running 40 games at the Ohio State Fair alone, on a circuit that includes Columbus, Ohio, Raleigh, North Carolina, Augusta, Georgia, Syracuse, New York, Hollywood, Florida, and Corpus Christi, Texas before tiring of the constant travels and con men who frequented this business. Chance founded the International Boxing Association during the 1990s, managed many fighters, and was its long-time president.

As part of the Angels' 50th anniversary, Chance threw out the first pitch before the June 4, 2011 game versus the New York Yankees.

Chance had one child, son Brett, who graduated from Ohio State University in 1985 and worked as an executive for the Ohio State Fair, the Ohio Expo Center, and Instagram. In August 2015 Chance was inducted into the Angels Hall of Fame.

Chance died at his home in Wooster on October 11, 2015, at the age of 74.

== See also ==
- List of Major League Baseball annual ERA leaders
- List of Major League Baseball annual wins leaders
- List of Major League Baseball no-hitters

Preceded by Don Wilson	No-hitter pitcher August 25, 1967	Succeeded by Joe Horlen
