= Sam McDowell =

American baseball player (1942–2026)

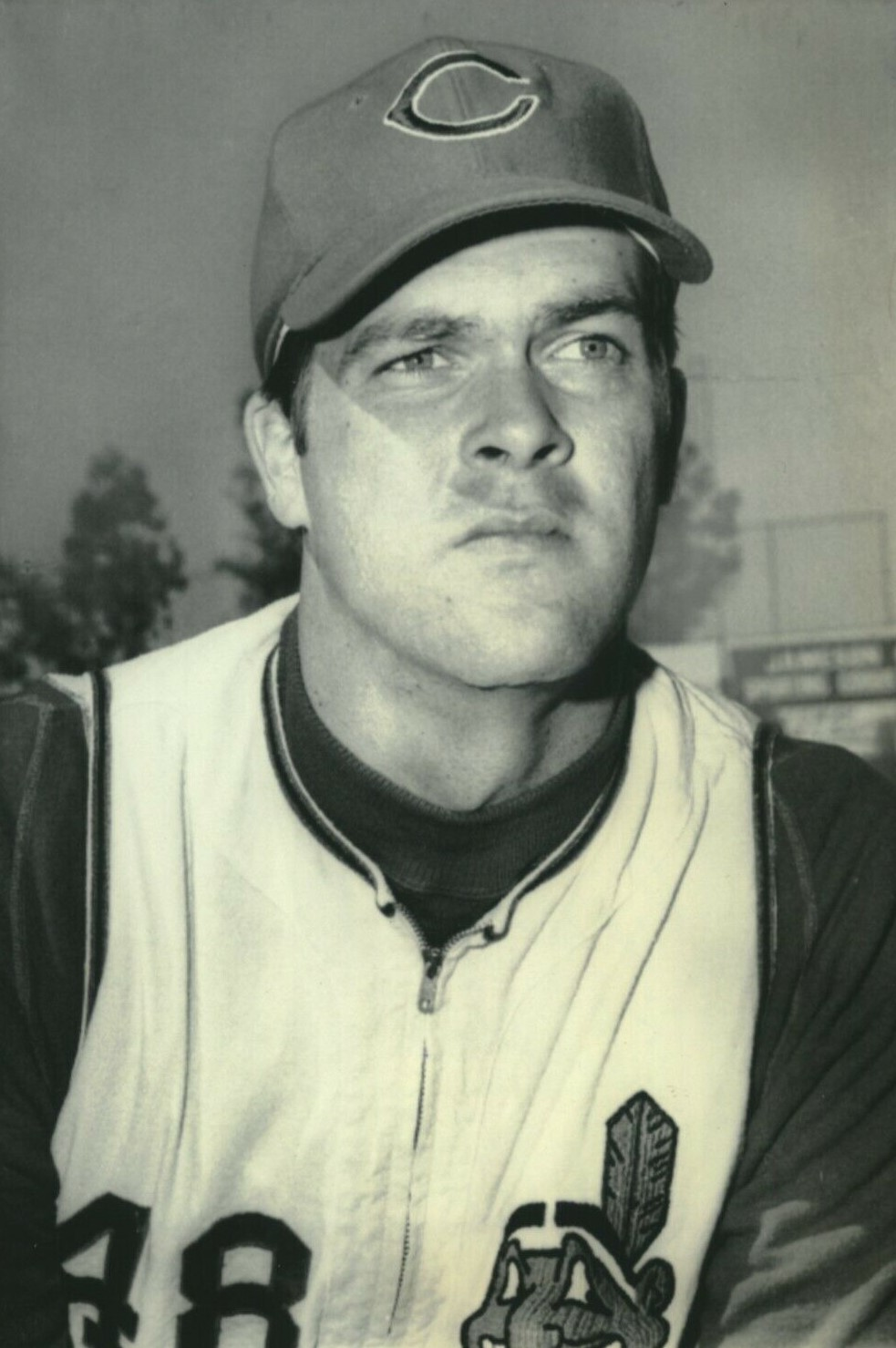
- McDowell with the Cleveland Indians in 1968
- Pitcher
- Born: September 21, 1942; Pittsburgh, Pennsylvania, U.S.
- Died: October 5, 2026 (aged 84); The Villages, Florida, U.S.
- Batted: Left Threw: Left

MLB debut
- September 15, 1961, for the Cleveland Indians

Last MLB appearance
- June 24, 1975, for the Pittsburgh Pirates

MLB statistics
- Win–loss record: 141–134
- Earned run average: 3.17
- Strikeouts: 2,453
- Stats at Baseball Reference

Teams
- Cleveland Indians (1961–1971); San Francisco Giants (1972–1973); New York Yankees (1973–1974); Pittsburgh Pirates (1975)

Career highlights and awards
- 6× All-Star (1965, 1966, 1968–1971); AL ERA leader (1965); 5× AL strikeout leader (1965, 1966, 1968–1970); Cleveland Guardians Hall of Fame

Samuel Edward Thomas McDowell (September 21, 1942 – October 5, 2026) was an American professional baseball player. He played in Major League Baseball as a starting pitcher from 1961 to 1975, most notably for the Cleveland Indians. A six-time All-Star, McDowell led the American League in strikeouts five times. Tall (6 feet, 5 inches) and powerful, his left-handed fastball was delivered with an unusually calm pitching motion, which led to his nickname, "Sudden Sam".

== Early life ==
McDowell was born in Pittsburgh, Pennsylvania, on September 21, 1942, one of six siblings. His father Thomas was a heat inspector for U.S. Steel. He attended Pittsburgh Central Catholic High School, where he played baseball, basketball, football and track, graduating in 1960. He had an 8–1 won–loss pitching record his senior year (though it has also been stated he was 8–0), with 152 strikeouts in 63 innings and no earned runs. McDowell had a total of nine no-hitters in high school. He pitched in the Colt World Series in 1960, throwing two no-hitters and a one-hitter. In 1960, he was considered the top baseball prospect in the country, and had signing bonus offers from all 16 major league teams.

== Professional career ==
=== 1960–61: Minor leagues and major league debut ===
During the 1960 season, as a high school graduate, McDowell signed with the Indians for a $75,000 bonus. McDowell made the signing announcement at the conclusion of his appearance in the third segment of To Tell the Truth aired on June 16, 1960. He spent the 1960 season with the Class D Lakeland Indians, where he had a 5–6 record, with a 3.35 earned run average (ERA). He struck out 100 batters in 104 2/3 innings pitched, but also had 80 bases on balls. He picked off 43 base runners, modeling his technique on Hall of Fame left-handed pitcher Warren Spahn, who had given McDowell pickoff tips when he was in Pittsburgh.

In 1961, McDowell was promoted to the Triple-A Salt Lake City Bees of the Pacific Coast League. He finished the year there with a record of 13–10 and a 4.42 ERA. He had 156 strikeouts and 152 bases on balls in 175 innings pitched; averaging 8 strikeouts per nine innings (K/9), but also 7.8 bases on balls per nine innings (BB/9). This was enough to earn him a promotion to the majors in September, and one week before his 19th birthday he made his MLB debut for the Indians. Starting against the Minnesota Twins, McDowell pitched 6 1/3 scoreless innings, giving up just three hits. He had to leave the game because he broke two ribs throwing a pitch. However, in a harbinger of things to come, he struck out five batters and also walked five batters before being relieved by Frank Funk. Funk gave up three runs in the 9th inning to lose the game, 3-2. McDowell did not pitch again in 1961, after the one appearance for Cleveland.

=== 1962–63: Struggle to establish himself ===
McDowell started the next season in Salt Lake City, but was quickly called up in mid-April for a start against the New York Yankees. His second start was not as good as his first: although the Indians won 9-3, McDowell did not make it out of the fifth inning, once again walking five batters and failing to qualify for a win. McDowell remained with the Indians as a swingman until the end of May, when he was sent back to the minors with a 6.04 ERA and 24 walks in 25 1/3 innings. After posting a 2.02 ERA in 6 games, he was recalled in July. The results were similar, as he finished with an ERA of 6.06 and 70 walks (a rate of 7.2 BB/9), but also 70 strikeouts in 87 2/3 innings.

McDowell's 1963 season represented something of an improvement over 1962. He started out well, pitching his first major league complete game on April 16 against the Washington Senators. McDowell gave up just two hits while striking out 13, but his control continued to be an issue as he also walked seven hitters. Although he improved his ERA to 4.85 and his bases on balls per nine innings to 6.1 while increasing his strikeouts per nine innings to 8.7, McDowell was sent down to the Indians top farm club (now the Jacksonville Suns) at the end of June and spent the rest of the season there. He also threw seven wild pitches, ninth-most in the league, despite pitching only 65 innings.

=== 1964: Breakout season ===
In 1964, the Indians again switched farm teams, this time assigning McDowell to the Portland Beavers. McDowell started out the season on fire, winning all eight of his decisions in only nine starts, including a no-hitter, with an impressive ERA of 1.18. Perhaps more impressively for him, he struck out 102 batters while walking just 24 in 76 innings. Once again, he was called up to the majors. It would be the last time McDowell would spend in the minor leagues. After winning a game in relief on May 31, McDowell pitched a complete game on June 2 against the Chicago White Sox, beating the White Sox 3-2. In a sign that his control might be coming around, he walked just three in the game while striking out 14. He continued to show flashes of brilliance during the season, finishing with a record of 11-6 with an ERA of 2.70, seventh-best in the American League. He also led the league in K/9 with 9.2, striking out 177 in 173 1/3 innings. His strikeout total was good for eighth in the AL. His BB/9 also continued to improve, dropping to 5.2, although he still walked an even 100 hitters, the fourth-highest total in the league.

=== 1965: All-Star ===
In 1965, McDowell was selected to the All-Star Team, the first of six such selections over the course of his career. He pitched two innings in the 1965 All-Star Game and wound up taking the loss for the AL. At the end of the year, "Sudden Sam" was at the top of several American League leader lists, including ERA (2.18), strikeouts (325), K/9 (10.7, a new MLB record), fewest hits per nine innings (5.9) and fewest home runs per nine innings (0.3). The strikeout total stands as the second-highest in franchise history after Bob Feller's 348 in 1946 and made him just the fifth pitcher in baseball's Modern Era (post 1900) to reach the 300 mark. Additionally, McDowell was the first pitcher reach that mark in less than 300 innings. His 273 innings pitched were second only to the Yankees' Mel Stottlemyre. He also finished 17th in the voting for Most Valuable Player (MVP). His control was perhaps the only flaw on his excellent season, as he also led the league in most walks allowed with 132, even though his BB/9 rate continued to drop, to 4.4.

The Indians were also improving, as they finished the season with their first winning record since 1959, with McDowell leading the way. Together with teammate Sonny Siebert, McDowell was one of the top four pitchers in the American League that year. The Indians pitching staff as a whole led the AL with 1,156 strikeouts, leading the league for the first of what would be five straight seasons.

=== 1966–67: Bumps in the road ===
McDowell slumped somewhat in 1966. Although he started hot, pitching back-to-back one-hitters on April 25 and May 1, he missed several games due to arm problems during the year. While he led the league in strikeouts for the second straight season, his total dropped to 225, as he managed just 194 1/3 innings. He posted a 2.87 ERA but won only nine games against eight losses. Of those nine wins, five were shutouts, a total that also led the league. He also made his second All-Star team, although he did not appear in the game due to an injury.

In 1967, although he did not miss any time, McDowell's numbers continued to decline. He won 13 games while losing 15, and he led the league in walks allowed, earned runs allowed, and wild pitches while posting a below-average 3.85 ERA. He also failed to lead the league in K/9 for the first time since becoming a full-time major leaguer, finishing second to teammate Luis Tiant with a 9.0 rate. The team as a whole set a record by striking out 1,189 batters. One of his few personal highlights came not as a pitcher, but as a batter, as he hit his first major league home run on May 21 off Boston Red Sox pitcher Bucky Brandon.

=== 1968–69: Returning to form ===
In 1968, the last season before the lowering of the pitcher's mound by 5 inches to 10 inches above the rest of the playing field, is often referred to as the "Year of the Pitcher." Fittingly, McDowell began to return to his pre-1966 form. He posted a career-best 1.81 ERA, second to Tiant, who posted a 1.60 mark. He also returned to his place atop the leader boards in strikeouts (283) and K/9 (9.5). While he led the league in walks allowed with 110, he posted his best BB/9 rate to date with a 3.7, while compiling a won-loss record of 15-14 (in 12 of those losses the Indians scored fewer than two runs).

In 1969, McDowell won 18 games, his best total thus far, while losing 14. He continued to lead the league in strikeouts (279) and K/9 (8.8). Although it was the first season McDowell had posted a strikeout rate of less than 9, he also posted a career-low BB/9 at 3.2, and for the first time did not lead the league in total walks allowed without missing time due to injuries or time in the minors, finishing sixth with 102. His 18 complete games were the third-most in the AL, and his four shutouts were fourth-most. He also was selected to the All-Star Game for the fourth time. In that game he struck out four batters in two innings, including Roberto Clemente. On June 27, he notched his 1,500th career strikeout.

=== 1970: Pitcher of the Year ===
For the only time in his career, McDowell reached the 20-win mark, posting a record of 20-12 in 1970. He also led the American League in innings pitched, topping the 300 mark (also for the only time) at 305. He reached the 300-strikeout mark as well for the first time since 1965 at 304, rounding up to a K/9 rate of 9.0, although he led the league in both those categories again. He also threw a career-high 19 complete games, second in the league to Mike Cuellar, giving him 37 complete games in the last two seasons. All this, combined with a fifth-best 2.92 ERA, led to his selection as "AL Pitcher of the Year" by The Sporting News. He also finished third overall in the AL Cy Young voting, just 10 points behind winner Jim Perry.

However, he led the league in walks allowed with 131, and in wild pitches with 17, the first time he had done so since 1967. He also gave up a career-high 25 home runs. During a July 6 game against the Washington Senators, McDowell became the last left-handed player to earn a fielding chance at second base, before returning to the pitcher position in the ninth inning.

=== 1971: End of the line in Cleveland ===
The year 1971 started on a rocky note, as McDowell held out during spring training, hoping for a six-figure contract. The contract he did sign was voided by Commissioner Bowie Kuhn because it contained illegal incentive clauses, and McDowell briefly left the team after his July 27 start. He eventually returned to the team on August 9, only to be suspended again later in the season.

Amidst all the turmoil, McDowell's performance suffered. His record slipped to 13-17, and his ERA jumped to 3.40. His K/9 was just 8.0, the hurler's lowest since 1962, although it was still second in the league. However, his control problems returned full-force, as he walked a career-high 153 batters in just 214 2/3 innings for a BB/9 of 6.4, also his worst since 1962. At the end of the season, McDowell demanded a trade, and Indians general manager Gabe Paul obliged. On November 29, he was traded to the San Francisco Giants for pitcher Gaylord Perry and shortstop Frank Duffy.

== Later career ==
=== San Francisco Giants ===
The trade turned out to be a disaster for the Giants. In 1972, McDowell had his worst season as a starting pitcher, posting his highest earned run average since 1963 at 4.33 while posting a 10-8 record. Although his control settled down a bit, as he posted a 4.7 BB/9 in 164 1/3 innings, he pitched just four complete games and failed to post a shutout for the first time since 1962, while his K/9 fell to 6.7, his worst to date. Meanwhile, Perry posted 24 wins with a 1.92 earned run average for Cleveland, winning his first Cy Young Award.

McDowell was sent to the bullpen to start the 1973 season. He had contemplated retirement during the offseason due to persistent back and neck pains, but he felt better after treatment and returned to the team. He started just three games for the Giants in the first two months, appearing 15 times in relief. He had a 1-2 record for the Giants with three saves and a 4.50 ERA. On June 7 McDowell was sold by the Giants to the New York Yankees in a straight cash deal.

=== New York Yankees ===
McDowell was moved back into the starting rotation for the Yankees, and his numbers improved somewhat. He started off hot, winning five of his first six starts, but failed to win another game after that. With the Yankees in 1973, he went 5-8 with a 3.95 ERA.

In 1974, McDowell was again hampered by injuries. A slipped disc cost him two months of the season, and even when he was available to pitch, he was used sparingly, appearing in only 13 games, seven of them starts. His results on the field continued to decline, as he posted career-worsts in K/9 (6.2) and BB/9 (7.7), winning just one game while losing six with a 4.69 ERA. On September 13, he left the team, and after the season asked for and was granted his release.

=== Pittsburgh Pirates ===
McDowell did not sign a contract until almost Opening Day in 1975, finally catching on with the Pittsburgh Pirates on April 2 after having to fight for a job during spring training. He returned to the bullpen, and his numbers began to improve. In 14 games for the Pirates, he posted a 2.86 ERA, while his K/9 (7.5) and BB/9 (5.2) both improved over the past two seasons. However, it wasn't enough, as the Pirates released him on June 26.

== Personal life and death ==
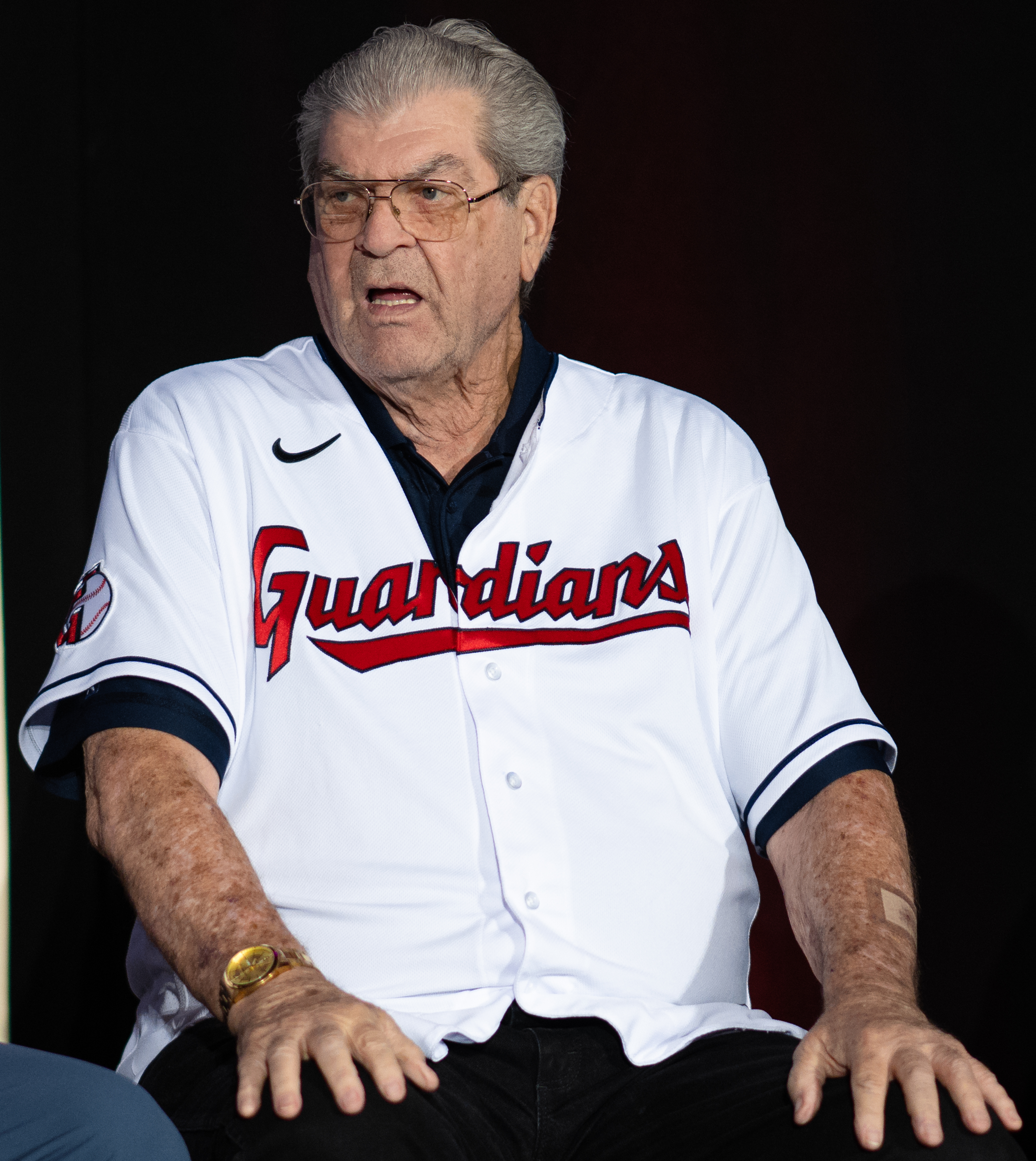
McDowell in 2023

After his playing career, McDowell's drinking increased to the point where it cost him his marriage. His wife left him, taking their two children with her, leaving him desolate and broke. A failed business venture had left McDowell $190,000 in debt, and by early 1980 he was living with his parents at his childhood home in Pittsburgh while selling insurance. Eventually, McDowell checked himself into Gateway Rehab, a rehabilitation facility located outside of Pittsburgh.

After repaying his debts, he enrolled at the University of Pittsburgh, where he earned associate degrees in sports psychology and addiction. Eventually, McDowell returned to the major leagues as a sports addiction counselor with the Toronto Blue Jays and Texas Rangers. McDowell earned a World Series ring while working with the 1993 Blue Jays. McDowell also worked as a consultant with the Baseball Assistance Team (BAT) and the Major League Baseball Players Alumni Association (MLBPAA). In 1998, McDowell started City of Legends, a retirement community for former players in Clermont, Florida. He remarried in 2001, having met his second wife, Eva, a Slovak tourist, when asking for directions in Florida.

While it is often thought the character of Sam Malone, the alcoholic ex-Boston Red Sox pitcher portrayed by Ted Danson in the television program Cheers, was based on the baseball life of McDowell, the show's co-creator Les Charles told The Athletic in 2026 that McDowell was not the inspiration for Malone. In a 2011 interview with the Pittsburgh Tribune-Review, McDowell joked "I would say I'm better with women than (Sam Malone) was."

McDowell died on October 5, 2026, at the age of 84.

== Legacy ==
McDowell finished with 2,453 career strikeouts and an average of 8.86 strikeouts per nine innings pitched, which ranked 46th and 45th, respectively, all-time at the end of 2026 season. His 2,159 strikeouts as an Indian place him second all time on the team's career list, behind Hall of Famer Bob Feller. Since his debut in 1961, only Nolan Ryan (11) and Randy Johnson (nine) have led their league in strikeouts more than McDowell (five). In his four All-Star appearances, McDowell struck out twelve NL All-Stars over eight innings, and he was the losing pitcher (in relief) in the 1965 game.

== See also ==
- List of Major League Baseball annual ERA leaders
- List of Major League Baseball annual strikeout leaders
- List of Major League Baseball career strikeout leaders
- Major League Baseball titles leaders
