= Bill Harrelson =

American baseball player (born 1945)

- Pitcher
- Born: November 17, 1945 (age 80); Tahlequah, Oklahoma, U.S.
- Batted: Switch Threw: Right

MLB debut
- July 31, 1968, for the California Angels

Last MLB appearance
- September 18, 1968, for the California Angels

MLB statistics
- Win–loss record: 1–6
- Earned run average: 5.08
- Strikeouts: 22
- Stats at Baseball Reference

Teams
- California Angels (1968)

William Charles Harrelson (born November 17, 1945) is an American former professional baseball pitcher who appeared in ten games in Major League Baseball for the 1968 California Angels. Harrelson threw right-handed and was a switch hitter; he was listed as 6 feet 5 inches (1.96 m) tall and 215 pounds (98 kg).

== Career ==
Harrelson, a "full blooded Cherokee Indian," was born in Tahlequah, Oklahoma. In 1964, he was signed by the Angels and began his professional baseball career that season. He played in the Pioneer League, California League, and Midwest League in 1964 and 1965 but had little success. In 1966, Harrelson went 8–11 with a 3.31 earned run average in the New York–Penn League; in 1967, he had his best season, going 7–4 with a 2.48 ERA for the California League's San Jose Bees. That performance got him promoted to Class AA, Class AAA, and finally the majors in 1968.

Harrelson made his major league debut with the Angels on July 31, 1968. He was involved in a pitching duel with future Hall of Famer Catfish Hunter that day, both allowing just one run through seven innings. Harrelson gave up just four hits, all singles, through seven, but he weakened in the eighth and eventually took the loss. Almost a month later, on August 27, he earned his only MLB victory by going 52/3 shutout innings against New York at Yankee Stadium. He allowed only one hit (to Joe Pepitone) but walked six, leaving with a 1–0 lead in the sixth. Andy Messersmith completed the two-man, one-hit shutout and earned the save, as the Angels won 2–0.

Harrelson made his final major league appearance on September 18. His ten big-league games included five starts; he posted a 1–6 record and one complete game, with no saves, and allowed 28 hits and 26 bases on balls in 332/3 career innings pitched. He struck out 22.

In 1969, Harrelson returned to the minors and played in the Texas League and Pacific Coast League. On January 14, 1970, he was traded to the Cincinnati Reds organization, along with Dan Loomer, for Jack Fisher. Harrelson had losing records in the minors in both 1970 and 1971 before retiring from baseball.
