= Don Mincher =

American baseball player (1938–2012)

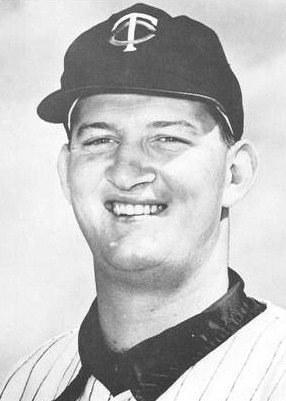
- First baseman
- Born: June 24, 1938; Huntsville, Alabama, U.S.
- Died: March 4, 2012 (aged 73); Huntsville, Alabama, U.S.
- Batted: Left Threw: Right

MLB debut
- April 18, 1960, for the Washington Senators

Last MLB appearance
- October 4, 1972, for the Oakland Athletics

MLB statistics
- Batting average: .249
- Home runs: 200
- Runs batted in: 643
- Stats at Baseball Reference

Teams
- Washington Senators / Minnesota Twins (1960–1966); California Angels (1967–1968); Seattle Pilots (1969); Oakland Athletics (1970–1971); Washington Senators / Texas Rangers (1971–1972); Oakland Athletics (1972)

Career highlights and awards
- 2× All-Star (1967, 1969); World Series champion (1972)

Donald Ray Mincher (June 24, 1938 – March 4, 2012) was an American Major League Baseball first baseman and longtime minor league executive. He played in the majors from 1960 to 1972 for the "original" Washington Senators and Minnesota Twins, California Angels, Seattle Pilots, Oakland Athletics, and the expansion Washington Senators and Texas Rangers, all of the American League. The native of Huntsville, Alabama, batted left-handed, threw right-handed, and was listed as 6 feet 3 inches (1.91 m) tall and weighed 205 pounds (93 kg). He was a member of the last editions of each of Washington's two 20th Century American League teams and their first-year squads in their new locales, Minneapolis–Saint Paul (1961) and Dallas–Fort Worth (1972). Based on his popularity in his hometown, he would gain the nickname of Mr. Baseball of Huntsville.

== Early life ==
Mincher was born on June 24, 1938, in Huntsville, Alabama to George Walter and Lillian Gladys (Cothren) Mincher. He graduated from S. R. Butler High School in 1956. In high school, he played baseball, basketball, and football; captaining the baseball and football teams as a senior. He was All-state and a high school All-American in football. He won the Sandlot Player of the Year award in baseball.

== Career ==
Mincher's professional baseball career began when he signed as an amateur free agent with the Chicago White Sox after graduating from Huntsville's S. R. Butler High School in 1956. He turned down a football scholarship to the University of Alabama to sign with the White Sox.

=== Minor league player ===
Mincher played in the White Sox minor league system from 1956-1959. He spent 1956-57 in Class-C baseball with the Duluth-Superior White Sox of the Northern League. He moved up to the Class-B Davenport DavSox in 1958, where he played 128 games at first base, with a .330 batting average, 23 home runs, 97 runs batted in (RBI), 101 runs scored, 29 doubles, and an OPS of .971. He was fifth in the Illinois-Indiana-Iowa League (Three-I League) in hitting, sixth in home runs and OPS, second in RBIs, and third in runs. He played for the Single-A Charleston ChaSox in 1959.

He steadily rose through the Chicago system over four years, but was traded to Washington on the eve of the 1960 season (April 4, 1960), along with young catcher Earl Battey, and $150,000 for veteran Senators' slugger Roy Sievers. He spent most of 1960 playing Double-A baseball for the Charleston Senators of the American Association, hitting .306 with 12 home runs in 112 games.

=== Major league player ===
==== Senators/Twins ====
He made his major league debut on April 18, 1960, as cleanup hitter and first baseman for the Senators; batting between Harmon Killebrew and Bob Allison. He played in 27 games for the Senators that year, with a .241 batting average in 79 at-bats. The Senators moved to Minnesota the following year, becoming the Minnesota Twins. From 1961-63, Mincher's playing time increased each year, starting 57 games at first base in 1963 playing behind Vic Power. The following year, he shared time at first base with Bob Allison; Mincher starting 65 games, and Allison starting 90 games. On the year, Mincher hit .237, with 23 home runs and 56 RBIs in only 287 at-bats. Allison hit .287, with 32 home runs and 86 RBIs in 492 at bats. From 1961-64, Mincher's home runs increased each year (5, 9, 17 to 23).

In 1965, he appeared in 128 regular-season games for the pennant-winning 1965 club, batting .251 with 22 home runs and 65 RBIs. He now split time at first base with future hall of famer Harmon Killebrew (who also played at third base), but Mincher started the majority of the Twins' games at first base (85). Mincher also appeared in all seven games of the 1965 World Series. Although he collected only three hits in 23 at bats (.130), his first hit was a home run off Don Drysdale in the second inning of Game 1. The home run off of Drysdale in World Series was something Mincher reflected on with deepening appreciation over the years; as well as his having batted against Sandy Koufax in that World Series. That home run scored Minnesota's first run of the Fall Classic. The Twins won that contest, 8–2, but Drysdale's Los Angeles Dodgers would ultimately prevail in seven games.

In 1966, Mincher would have his most starts at first base for the Twins (118). Killebrew played 40 games at first base, but the majority of his games were at third base. Mincher had his franchise high in plate appearances (497) and games (139), repeating his .251 batting average from 1965; but his home runs fell to 14, and RBI total to 62. Killebrew hit .281, with 39 home runs and 110 RBIs. After the season was over, the Twins traded Mincher, Jimmie Hall and Pete Cimino to California Angels in exchange for Dean Chance and a player to be named later (Jackie Hernandez). Killebrew was the full time Twins first baseman in 1967.

==== Angels and Pilots ====
Mincher was named to the American League All-Star team in his first year with the Angels, contributing a pinch-hit single in the game. He played in a career high 147 games, batting .273, with 25 home runs, 76 RBIs, and an OPS of .854. He was also 21st in AL MVP voting. In 1968, he hit only .236, with 13 home runs and 48 RBIs. Mincher was hit in the face by a pitch from Cleveland Indians pitcher Sam McDowell during the season, leading to headaches and dizziness and affecting his quality of play and availability. The Angels did not protect him in the October 1968 expansion draft, and he was selected by the Seattle Pilots with the second overall pick.

Mincher rebounded in 1969 on the Pilots with 25 home runs and 78 RBIs, during the team's only year of existence before becoming the Milwaukee Brewers. He was selected to the 1969 All-Star team, becoming one of only two Seattle Pilots players ever named an all star (along with Mike Hegan). Despite his successes, Mincher was traded by Brewers before their first season, along with Ron Clark, to the Oakland Athletics for Phil Roof, Mike Hershberger, Lew Krausse and Ken Sanders.

==== Athletics (twice), Senators/Rangers ====
In 1970, Mincher batted .246 and slugged a career-high 27 homers while driving in 74 runs in 140 games as a member of the 1970 Oakland Athletics. In May of the following season, the A's traded Mincher with Frank Fernandez, Paul Lindblad and cash to the Washington Senators (the expansion team created in 1961) for Mike Epstein and Darold Knowles. In 323 at-bats for the Senators, he hit .291, with 10 home runs and 45 RBIs; with season totals of 12 home runs, 53 RBIs and a career best .280 batting average. The Senators became the Texas Rangers in 1972, where he played in 61 games before being traded back to the A's with Ted Kubiak for Marty Martinez, Vic Harris and a player to be named later (Steve Lawson).

His playing career ended after the 1972 season, which saw the 34-year-old Mincher hit only .148 with 5 RBIs in 47 games, mostly as a pinch hitter, after Oakland reacquired him from the Rangers on July 26. Ironically, he was stuck playing behind Epstein, for whom he had earlier been traded. But in the 1972 World Series, Mincher's ninth-inning pinch single in Game 4 off Clay Carroll drove home the tying run, as the Athletics came from behind to defeat the Cincinnati Reds, 3–2. Mincher's name appeared in the box scores of two other games, but he never officially batted in either contest when he was replaced by a right-handed pinch hitter. Oakland defeated Cincinnati in seven games, earning Mincher a World Series championship ring.

==== Career ====
Mincher belted more than 20 homers five times in his first seven years as an everyday player. All told, over all or parts of 13 MLB seasons, Mincher batted .249, with 1,003 hits, 176 doubles, 16 triples and 200 home runs and 643 runs batted in (RBI) in 1,400 career games. He was elected to the American League All-Star team twice (1967 and 1969).

== Minor league executive ==
Mincher served as the first president and general manager of the Huntsville Stars, the Double-A affiliate of the Oakland A's (1985–1998) and, later, the Milwaukee Brewers (1999–2014). He served in this role from 1985 until 2001. In 1994, Mincher and a group of local investors purchased the team from Larry Schmittou to keep baseball in Huntsville.

In 2000, Mincher was named interim president of the Southern League, where the Stars played, when league president Arnold Fielkow left for an executive position with the New Orleans Saints of the National Football League. Mincher resigned from his position with the Stars when his group sold the team to Miles Prentice in early 2001 (who sold the team in 2014, which moved to Biloxi beginning in 2015). During his time with the Stars, Mincher was twice named Executive of the Year. Once Mincher left the Stars, this cleared the way for the Southern League to remove the interim tag and they made him league president beginning with the 2001 season. He served as league president until retiring in October 2011 for health reasons, at which point the league named him President-Emeritus.

Mincher was elected to the Alabama Sports Hall of Fame in 2008. Though he never played for the team, the Huntsville Stars retired his number 5 in an on-field ceremony on June 6, 2008. In 2008, he also received the Warren Giles Award for Minor League Baseball's most outstanding service as a league president. In 2010, he was presented with the King of Baseball award given by Minor League Baseball, its highest honor.

== Personal life ==
From 1972 to 1985 he owned and operated Don Mincher's All Sports Trophies. At the time of his death, Mincher had been married to Patsy Ann (Payne) Mincher for 56 years, and they had three children, six grandchildren and four great grandchildren. Patsy Mincher had worked closely with her husband for the Southern League, and was recognized as "'The First Lady of Southern League Baseball.'"

== Death ==
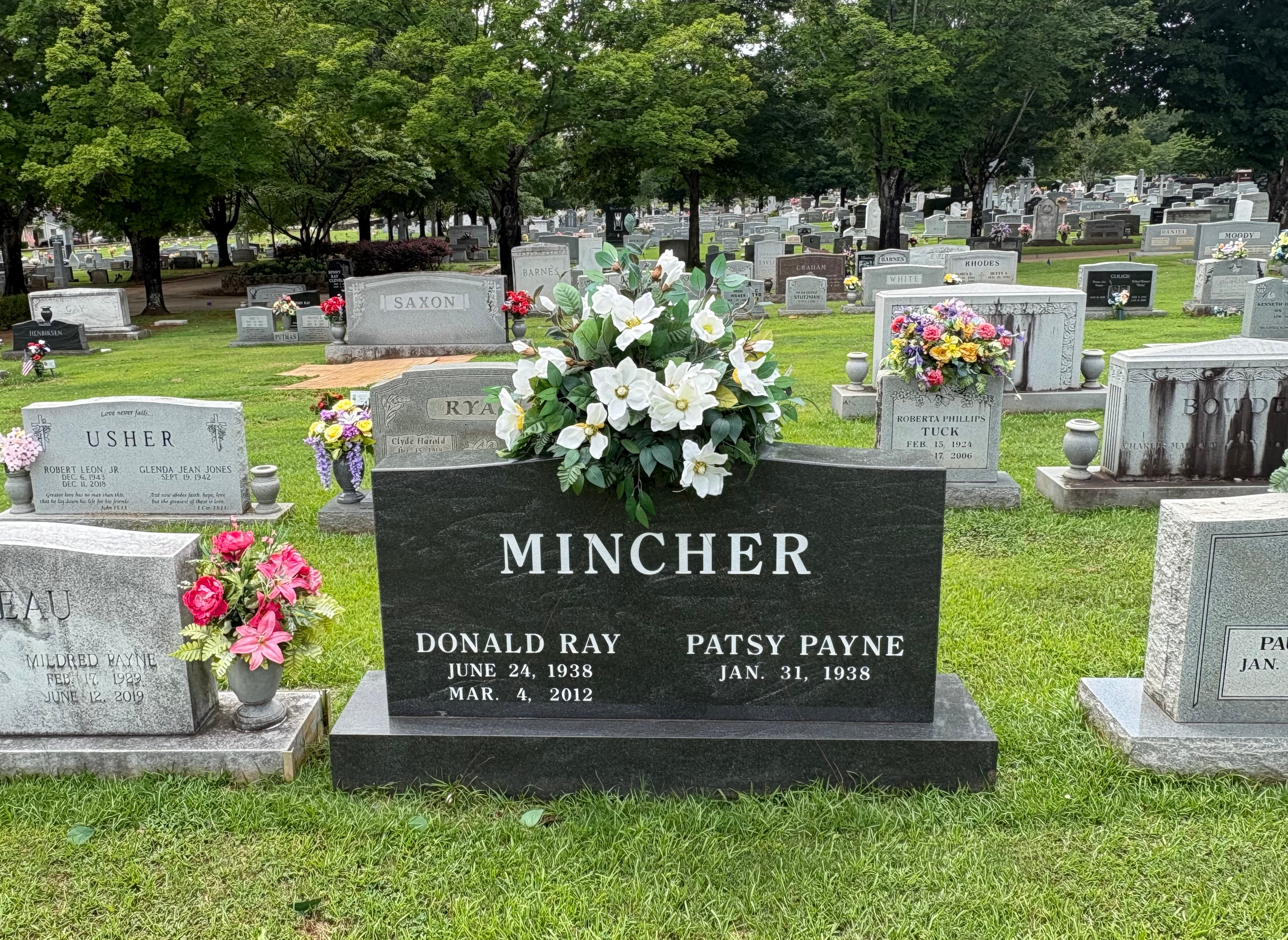
Mincher's grave at Maple Hill Cemetery

Mincher died after a long illness on March 4, 2012. He was buried at Maple Hill Cemetery in Huntsville.

== Legacy ==
On June 9, 1966, in the seventh inning of a game against the Kansas City Athletics, Mincher was one of five Twins players to hit home runs. The others were Harmon Killebrew, Tony Oliva, Rich Rollins and Zoilo Versalles. These five home runs still stand as a Major League record for the most home runs in a single inning, and were hit off starter Catfish Hunter (two), reliever Paul Lindblad (two), and reliever John Wyatt.

Mincher was one of only 21 players to hit a home run completely over the right-field roof and out of Tiger Stadium in Detroit during the 64-year history of its final configuration. He accomplished the feat on August 23, 1964, as a member of the Minnesota Twins.

Two roads in Huntsville were named Don Mincher Drive.
