= Jimmie Hall =

American baseball player (born 1938)

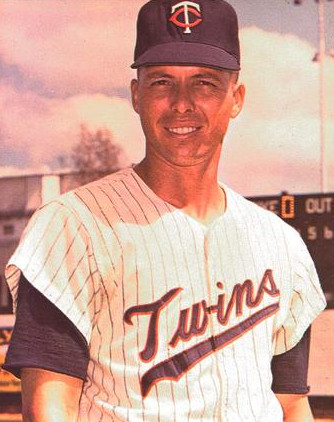
- Hall in 1965
- Outfielder
- Born: March 17, 1938 (age 88); Mount Holly, North Carolina, U.S.
- Batted: Left Threw: Right

MLB debut
- April 9, 1963, for the Minnesota Twins

Last MLB appearance
- September 13, 1970, for the Atlanta Braves

MLB statistics
- Batting average: .254
- Home runs: 121
- Runs batted in: 391
- Stats at Baseball Reference

Teams
- Minnesota Twins (1963–1966); California Angels (1967–1968); Cleveland Indians (1968–1969); New York Yankees (1969); Chicago Cubs (1969–1970); Atlanta Braves (1970)

Career highlights and awards
- 2× All-Star (1964, 1965)

Jimmie Randolph Hall (born March 17, 1938) is an American former Major League Baseball outfielder and left-handed batter who played eight seasons in the big leagues. A two-time All-Star, Hall made his debut with the Minnesota Twins (1963–66), followed by stints with the California Angels (1967–68), Cleveland Indians (1968–69), New York Yankees (1969), Chicago Cubs (1969–70) and Atlanta Braves (1970).

== Early life ==
Hall was born on March 17, 1938, in Mount Holly, North Carolina. By six years old, he was doing farmwork behind a plough. He was a star baseball player at Belmont High School, and in American Legion baseball under coach Lawrence "Crash" Davis. In 1954, his American Legion team was runner up in the American Legion World Series. His father, James Hall, convinced Hall to pursue a baseball career.

== Baseball career ==
=== Minor league ===
Hall was signed as an amateur free agent by the Washington Senators on June 21, 1956 following his high school graduation, who had outbid the Baltimore Orioles, Chicago Cubs, Cleveland Indians, New York Yankees, and Pittsburgh Pirates for Hall's services. After signing, Hall was assigned to the Superior Senators in the Class D Nebraska State League where he made an immediate impression-hitting .385 with 15 home runs, 6 triples, and 11 doubles in only 58 games. However, he would fail to build on, or even equal, this level of production at the plate and would languish for the next six full seasons in the minors before seeing the major leagues.

Promoted to the Kinston Eagles in the Class B Carolina League in 1957 on the strength of his debut season, Hall would regress in his sophomore season and only hit .233 with 6 home runs in 133 games. Forced to repeat the same level in 1958, Hall regained some of his power stroke, hitting 17 home runs and 14 doubles to go along with a .267 batting average in 75 games for the Fox Cities Foxes in the Illinois–Indiana–Iowa League before being promoted to the Single-A Charlotte Hornets in the South Atlantic League for the final 9 games of their season.

In 1959, Hall was promoted to the Double-A Southern Association and spent the entire season with the Chattanooga Lookouts. However, he continued to be unimpressive at the plate, hitting .245 with 11 home runs and 57 runs batted in (RBI) in 133 games. Hall also was given an extended tryout at shortstop (with the Senators typically only having all-field, no-hit options on the major league roster), but he would struggle in the field at this new position and commit 24 errors in only 78 games.

Although Hall would be promoted to the Triple-A Charleston Senators in 1960, he would hit only .227 with 9 home runs and 30 RBIs in 110 games, in which he would see double digit starts at second, third, shortstop, and the outfield. The 1961 and 1962 seasons saw Hall appear in only 54 total games spread over three Triple-A teams, the Syracuse Chiefs, Toronto Maple Leafs, and Vancouver Mounties, hitting a combined .232. The only bright spot would be that the Senators gave up trying to convert Hall into a utility infielder and he saw all his playing time in the outfield. Maybe coincidentally, Hall would hit .313 with 3 home runs and 18 RBIs in 24 games with Vancouver in 1962.

=== Major league ===
==== 1963 ====
After not spending a day in the major leagues, Hall went north with the Twins in 1963 as a reserve outfielder behind future Hall of Famer Harmon Killebrew in left field, All-Star and former Rookie of the Year Bob Allison in right, and veteran Lenny Green in center. Hall would get off to an inauspicious start, hitting only .185 through the first 48 games, but a mid-June injury to Green would give Hall the chance to showcase himself for an extended period of time and he excelled with the opportunity. Hall started 125 games of the 143 games he played in, ultimately replacing Green.

Starting on June 8, Hall would be the starting centerfielder and he would sparkle, hitting .276 with 31 of his 33 home runs, 72 of his 80 RBI, and 72 of his 88 runs over the Twins' final 116 games. Hall's home run total would set a career high, rank fourth in the AL in 1963, and stood for more than 50 years as the AL record for home runs by a first-year player with not even a game of prior major league experience (topping Ted Williams' 31 homers in 1939) until broken by Jose Abreu in 2014. He is one of only two players in the modern era of major league baseball history, along with Dodgers outfielder Joc Pederson (2015), to have two streaks of home runs in four consecutive games or more in their rookie season.

In addition to being fourth in the AL in home runs, he was sixth in OPS (on base plus slugging) seventh in WAR (wins above replacement) among all AL players and seventh in runs, and fifth in slugging percentage. At the end of the season, he would finish third in the Rookie of the Year voting behind a pair of Chicago White Sox, third baseman Pete Ward and starting pitcher Gary Peters. Hall's breakout rookie season was more than enough for him to supplant Green as the Twins' center fielder going forward and Green would be traded early in the 1964 season to the Los Angeles Angels as part of a three-team trade with the Baltimore Orioles with the Twins receiving utilityman Frank Kostro and infielder Jerry Kindall in return.

==== 1964 ====
Handed the center fielder job to start the 1964 season, Hall had a decent sophomore season but did not quite reproduce his 1963 production. He was hit in the face by a fastball that season, the effects of which were severe enough to cause him to miss some playing time, but he had only nine less plate appearances than in 1963. Although he would raise his batting average to .282, his power would fall off somewhat with a 24% drop in home runs (from 33 to 25) and a 40% drop in triples (5 to 3). Hall was ninth in the AL in slugging percentage (.480), 23rd among all MLB players in home runs, and 25th among all MLB players in RBIs (75).

The Twins would also see a drop off, going from a 91 win, third-place finish in 1963 to 79 wins and sixth in the 10-team AL. However, Hall would be named to his first All-Star game in 1964, along with teammates Killebrew, Allison, Tony Oliva, and Camilo Pascual, and would be a 9th inning defensive replacement for the AL starter in centerfield, Mickey Mantle.

On May 2, 1964, Minnesota became the third club in the MLB history to hit four consecutive home runs in the same inning, as Oliva, Allison, Hall, and Killebrew all connected in the top of the 11th inning in a 3–3 tie game. With 3 home runs off Kansas City Athletics reliever Dan Pfister and Killebrew's off his replacement, Vern Handrahan, the Twins would pull out a 7–3 victory.

On May 27 versus the Los Angeles Angels, he led off the fifth inning and was hit on the cheek by a pitch from left hander Bo Belinsky, known for his overpowering fastball. Hall immediately exited the game, but returned to the starting lineup about a week later and then played well for the remainder of the season while wearing a special protective flap on his batting helmet. However, this beaning and his already feeble showing against left-handed pitchers - hitting .187 with only 4 of his 121 career home runs off them - arguably contributed to his being timid and ineffective versus southpaws, and could contribute to why he ended up finished as a productive player by his sixth season.

This theory has been called into question in light of his already existing weakness against left handed pitching, and having arguably his best all around season in 1965; the year immediately after his being hit. In 1963, before the beaning, he hit .235 with one home run in 68 at-bats against left-handed pitching, while hitting .263 with 32 home runs against right-handers. In the year after Belinsky hit him, 1965, Hall similarly had a .240 average against lefthanders with one home run in 96 at-bats, while hitting .296 with 19 home runs against right handers; with career highs in batting average, on base percentage and RBIs. In 1966 and 1967, however, his average against left-handers fell to .163 and .098 respectively, with only one home run combined in 84 total at-bats those two years. His production against right handers in 1966 was .249 with 19 home runs, and .267 with 16 home runs in 1967.

==== 1965 ====
Hall was almost traded to the Mets before the 1965 season, but the deal fell through. His 1965 would basically be a carbon copy of the previous season and would see him hit career highs in average (.285), RBI (86), doubles (25), and stolen bases (14), but would also see another drop in home runs to 20. Showcasing both his power and speed, Hall not only hit 20 home runs in 1965 but also beat out 20 infield singles. Hall was sixth in the AL in RBIs, eighth in batting average, ninth in runs scored, 10th in stolen bases, 12th in slugging percentage, and 16th in home runs. He was 10th among AL position players in WAR.

He would be named to his last All-Star team in the July 13 game that was played at Minnesota's Metropolitan Stadium, along with five fellow Twins (first baseman Harmon Killebrew, catcher Earl Battey, pitcher Mudcat Grant, shortstop Zoilo Versalles and Tony Oliva), and went hitless with a walk and a run in two plate appearances after pinch hitting for pitcher Pete Richert in the bottom of the fifth inning and moving over to center field in place of starter Vic Davalillo to begin the sixth.

Hall's struggles against lefties in 1965 (a .240 batting average) continued in that year's World Series against the NL champion Los Angeles Dodgers. With five of the seven games started by southpaws Sandy Koufax, the 1965 Cy Young Award winner, and Claude Osteen, Hall would only play in the two games started by right hander Don Drysdale (in which he would strike out five times with one hit and one walk in 7 plate appearances). With no help from Hall's righthanded substitute the Twins would lose the Series four games to three.

==== 1966 ====
Hall would see a big drop in playing time in 1966 (from 148 games to 120) as the Twins would more often sit him against tough lefties. Rookie left hander Ted Uhlaender would be given significant playing time in center as Hall would play all three outfield positions, with most of his time being in left in place of ailing slugger Allison. With reduced playing time, Hall saw an across-the-board drop in all statistical categories, hitting only .239 with 20 home runs, 47 RBI, and 7 doubles (falling off a cliff from 1965's 25 doubles), but would still slug at least 20 home runs for the fourth season in a row. Deciding to employ the light-hitting Uhlaender full-time in center, the Twins traded Hall on December 2 to the Angels along with reliever Pete Cimino and first baseman Don Mincher for starter Dean Chance and a player to be named (which would become infielder Jackie Hernandez on April 10, 1967).

==== 1967 ====
Employed similarly in 1967, Hall would share time in a lefty/righty platoon with Bubba Morton, getting only 41 at-bats against left handers in 129 games (hitting a .098 with one extra base hit), and would put up similar numbers to 1966 (.249, 16 HRs and 55 RBI) and reaching double figures in home runs for the fifth consecutive season. However, he would be finished as a full-time player.

==== 1968 ====
Hall was batting .214 with one homer and eight RBI in 46 games when he was traded from the Angels to the Cleveland Indians for Vic Davalillo before the trade deadline on June 15, 1968. The change of scenery would not help Hall as he would hit only .198 in 53 games.

==== 1969 ====
Hall started 1969 with the Indians but ended up with the New York Yankees and Chicago Cubs before the season was out.

==== 1970 ====
Hall started 1970 with the Cubs but ended it with the Atlanta Braves. He retired after the 1970 season.

==== Career totals ====
In eight seasons, Hall batted .254 with 121 home runs, 391 RBI, 387 runs, 100 doubles, 24 triples, 38 stolen bases and 287 walks in 963 games. Defensively, Hall recorded a .981 fielding percentage playing at all three outfield positions and first base.

== Honors ==
In 2008, Hall was inducted into the Gaston County Sports Hall of Fame.

== Personal life ==
During the 1967-68 offseason, Hall worked as a furniture salesman in Denver, North Carolina, and as a sports announcer at radio station WCGC. He had a sports talk radio show, and called the play-by-play for Gaston College’s basketball games. After retiring, he worked for Carolina Freight.
