= Rickey Clark =

American baseball player (born 1946)

- Pitcher
- Born: March 21, 1946 (age 79); Mount Clemens, Michigan, U.S.
- Batted: Right Threw: Right

MLB debut
- April 22, 1967, for the California Angels

Last MLB appearance
- September 7, 1972, for the California Angels

MLB statistics
- Win–loss record: 19–32
- Earned run average: 3.38
- Strikeouts: 236
- Stats at Baseball Reference

Teams
- California Angels (1967–1969, 1971–1972)

Rickey Charles Clark (born March 21, 1946) is a retired American professional baseball player and right-handed pitcher who appeared in all or parts of five seasons in Major League Baseball for the California Angels. At 21, Clark had a highly promising rookie season for the pennant-contending 1967 Angels, but struggled thereafter during his big league career.

Born in Mount Clemens, Michigan, Clark was signed by his hometown Detroit Tigers in 1965, after graduating from Redford Union High School and just prior to the institution of the Major League Baseball draft. After two seasons in the Tiger farm system, the Angels selected the 6 ft 2 in (1.88 m), 170 lb (77 kg) pitcher in the 1966 Rule 5 draft.

== Sparkling rookie season ==
Rule 5's terms (then as now) dictated that the Angels keep Clark on their 25-man big-league roster for the entire 1967 season or offer him back to the Detroit organization, but Clark would earn his place in the Angels' starting rotation on merit.

After he won his MLB debut on April 22 with four scoreless innings in relief against the Cleveland Indians, Clark made his first start eight days later against the New York Yankees; he went seven innings, allowed only four hits and two earned runs, and collected his second big-league triumph. Manager Bill Rigney then kept Clark as a regular member of the Angel starting staff through the remainder of the season, in which the Angels battled for the American League pennant before fading in September. Clark won 12 games, tying him with staff ace Jim McGlothlin and closer Minnie Rojas for the team lead in victories. His 2.59 earned run average also was best among Angel starters. He threw a two-hit, complete game shutout against the Washington Senators on September 8 at D.C. Stadium. It was his only complete game and shutout of the season.

== Later MLB career ==
The following year, 1968, saw Clark lose nine of his first ten decisions (despite a respectable 3.27 earned run average) and drop out of the Angel starting rotation in early July. He worked in only 941/3 innings pitched, half of his 1967 workload, and finished the year with a 1–11 record. He then spent most of 1969, all of 1970, and the early weeks of 1971 in the minor leagues. But the Angels recalled him in June 1971, and in his third appearance and second starting assignment, Clark tossed another two-hit shutout, this time against the eventual division champion Oakland Athletics at Anaheim Stadium on July 2. Those two-hitters, almost four years apart, would be the only shutouts of his MLB career.

Clark spent the entire 1972 season with the Angels, working in 26 games (with 15 starts) and hurling two more complete games. But he posted a 4–9 record and a 4.51 earned run average and during the offseason his contract was sold to the Philadelphia Phillies' organization, where he spent 1973 at Triple-A before leaving baseball.

In 96 major league games pitched (70 starts), Clark won 19 games and lost 32 (.373) with a 3.38 career earned run average. In 4312/3 innings pitched, he allowed 371 hits and 213 bases on balls, striking out 236.
