= Pete Cimino =

American baseball player (born 1942)

- Relief pitcher
- Born: October 17, 1942 (age 83); Philadelphia, Pennsylvania, U.S.
- Batted: Right Threw: Right

MLB debut
- September 22, 1965, for the Minnesota Twins

Last MLB appearance
- May 7, 1968, for the California Angels

MLB statistics
- Win–loss record: 5–8
- Earned run average: 3.07
- Strikeouts: 139
- Stats at Baseball Reference

Teams
- Minnesota Twins (1965–1966); California Angels (1967–1968)

Peter William Cimino (/sɪˈmiːnoʊ/ sih-MEE-noh; born October 17, 1942) is an American former professional baseball player who played four seasons for the Minnesota Twins and California Angels of Major League Baseball. He once scored 114 points in a high school basketball game and also had 20 strikeouts in one minor league baseball game. During his playing career, Cimino stood at 6 ft 2 in (1.88 m) and weighed 195 lbs.

== 114-point game ==
Cimino was born in Philadelphia. A star athlete at Bristol High School, he was both a pitcher on the baseball team and a forward on the basketball team.

Cimino might be best known for scoring 114 points in a high school basketball game on January 22, 1960. The single-game shooting outburst occurred during a 134–86 win over Palisades High School, in a Lower Bucks County League match. In the game, Cimino made 44 of 79 field goal attempts and 26 of 29 free throw attempts. He scored all 69 of his team's second half points. The 114-point total is still a Pennsylvania state record and is also the fourth highest in any United States boys high school game. The 44 field goals made and 79 attempts were both national single-game records at the time.

Afterwards, Cimino said, "All I wanted to do was break the league mark of 62. But the guys on the team kept getting the rebounds and I was able to score a lot on the fast break."

== Baseball career ==
Later in 1960, Cimino signed a professional baseball contract with the Washington Senators. He started his career that season as a pitcher for the Class D Wytheville Senators and went 6–2 with a 3.43 earned run average. The next season, he moved up to the Class B Wilson Tobs, of the Carolina League. Cimino didn't have much success in 1961, going just 4–5 with a 5.61 ERA. However, he bounced back in 1962. On April 30, 1962, he tied a Carolina League record by striking out 20 batters in one game. He went 12–13 that season and lowered his ERA to 3.36, while using his "blazing fastball" to record 190 strikeouts in 190 innings.

Cimino started 1963 with the AA Charlotte Hornets. He pitched well early in the season and then moved up again, to the AAA Dallas-Fort Worth Rangers. In 1964, he had a mediocre year with the International League's Atlanta Crackers, going 3–6 with a 4.50 ERA in 120 innings. He rebounded once again the following season with the Pacific Coast League's Denver Bears, winning 9 of 16 decisions. He was then called up to the major league Minnesota Twins. In his major league debut on September 22, he pitched one inning without allowing a baserunner.

Cimino spent 1966 as a relief pitcher for the Twins. He pitched 64.2 innings in 35 games and struck out 57. His 2.92 ERA was better than the league average. On December 2, he was traded, along with Jimmie Hall and Don Mincher, to the California Angels, for Dean Chance and Jackie Hernández. In 1967, he had 80 strikeouts in 88.1 innings for the Angels. He also started off 1968 with the major league club, pitching in four games, but was sold to the Seattle Angels on May 8. Cimino never returned to the major leagues.

== See also ==
- List of basketball players who have scored 100 points in a single game
