= Jim Weaver (left-handed pitcher) =

American baseball player (born 1939)

- Pitcher
- Born: February 19, 1939 (age 87); Lancaster, Pennsylvania, U.S.
- Batted: Left Threw: Left

MLB debut
- August 13, 1967, for the California Angels

Last MLB appearance
- June 29, 1968, for the California Angels

MLB statistics
- Win–loss record: 3–1
- Earned run average: 2.55
- Strikeouts: 28
- Stats at Baseball Reference

Teams
- California Angels (1967–1968)

James Brian Weaver (born February 19, 1939), nicknamed "Fluff", is an American former Major League Baseball pitcher. He played parts of two seasons, 1967 and 1968, for the California Angels.

== Sources ==
- Career statistics from Baseball Reference · Baseball Reference (Minors) · Retrosheet · Baseball Almanac
