= Orlando McFarlane =

Cuban baseball player (1938–2007)

- Catcher
- Born: June 28, 1938; Victoria de Las Tunas, Las Tunas Province, Cuba
- Died: July 17, 2007 (aged 69); Ponce, Puerto Rico
- Batted: Right Threw: Right

MLB debut
- April 23, 1962, for the Pittsburgh Pirates

Last MLB appearance
- August 21, 1968, for the California Angels

MLB statistics
- Batting average: .240
- Home runs: 5
- Runs batted in: 20
- Stats at Baseball Reference

Teams
- Pittsburgh Pirates (1962, 1964); Detroit Tigers (1966); California Angels (1967–1968)

Orlando de Jesús McFarlane Quesada (June 28, 1938 – July 18, 2007) was a Cuban professional baseball player. He played as a catcher in Major League Baseball for the Pittsburgh Pirates, Detroit Tigers and California Angels in parts of five seasons spanning 1962–1968. Listed at 6' 0" (1.82 m),180 lb. (82 k), he batted and threw right handed.

== Early years ==
He was born and raised in Victoria de Las Tunas.

== Career ==
McFarlane signed a free agent contract with the Pittsburgh Pirates in 1958. He spent two seasons in the Pirates minor league system before debuting in the Cuban League, where he played for the Alacranes de Almendares club during the 1959-60 and 1960-61 winter seasons.

Shortly thereafter, the Cuban government replaced the former professional baseball system with new amateur baseball leagues. As a result, like many Cuban ballplayers, McFarlane decided to migrate to the United States to try his luck in a new environment.

In 1961, McFarlane joined the Class A Asheville Tourists, where he posted a solid slash line of .301/.400/.528 with 74 runs batted in in 114 games, including 21 home runs and 27 stolen bases, a remarkable total for a catcher, being named the best prospect in the South Atlantic League.

MacFarlane opened 1962 at Triple A Columbus Jets, hitting for them a .308 average with 11 homers and 61 RBI. He would make his debut with the Pirates near the end of the year, appearing in eight games, but he never achieved the success predicted for him at Asheville.

After that, MacFarlane spent one and a half season at Triple A and returned to the Pirates for a brief stint in 1964. He then battled with injuries and inconsistency throughout the next three years, as he split time between the Majors and the Minors with the Tigers and Angels organizations.

MacFarlane later played parts of four seasons in the minor leagues, concluding in 1971 with the Diablos Rojos del México which had acquired him from the Tidewater Tides for Francisco Estrada on November 30, 1970. In a ten-season minors career, he slashed .285/.372/.478 with 129 home runs and 544 RBI in 960 games appearances.

In between, Mc Farlane played winter ball for the Águilas Cibaeñas in the Dominican Republic, where he led the league in home runs in 1963-64 (10) and 1964-65 (8). Additionally, he played with the Tigres de Aragua in Venezuela and the Leones de Ponce in Puerto Rico, where he lived for the rest of his life.

Even more, Mc Farlane gained notoriety in Puerto Rico when he had his wedding ceremony performed at the Estadio Francisco Montaner, homestand of the Leones.

== Death ==
McFarlane died in 2007 in Ponce, Puerto Rico, at the age of 69.
