= George Brunet =

American baseball player (1935–1991)

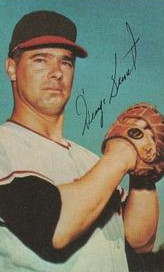
- Pitcher
- Born: June 8, 1935; Houghton, Michigan, U.S.
- Died: October 25, 1991 (aged 56); Poza Rica, Veracruz, Mexico
- Batted: Right Threw: Left

MLB debut
- September 14, 1956, for the Kansas City Athletics

Last MLB appearance
- April 28, 1971, for the St. Louis Cardinals

MLB statistics
- Win–loss record: 69–93
- Earned run average: 3.62
- Strikeouts: 921
- Stats at Baseball Reference

Teams
- Kansas City Athletics (1956–1957, 1959–1960); Milwaukee Braves (1960–1961); Houston Colt .45's (1962–1963); Baltimore Orioles (1963); Los Angeles / California Angels (1964–1969); Seattle Pilots (1969); Washington Senators (1970); Pittsburgh Pirates (1970); St. Louis Cardinals (1971)

Member of the Mexican Professional

Baseball Hall of Fame
- Induction: 1999

George Stuart Brunet (June 8, 1935 – October 25, 1991) was an American professional baseball pitcher who also went on to a Mexican Professional Baseball Hall of Fame career in Mexico. Brunet pitched for nine different Major League clubs during his career in the U.S.

== Career ==
=== Kansas City Athletics ===
Brunet was born in Houghton, Michigan, and attended Calumet High School in Calumet, Michigan. He was originally signed by Detroit Tigers scout and former pitcher Schoolboy Rowe in 1952. Brunet pitched three seasons in the Sooner State League before being released. He caught on with the Kansas City Athletics in 1955, and received his first call up to the majors in 1956. Brunet made his major league debut on September 14, 1956, against the Washington Senators, tossing a scoreless inning in a 4–1 loss. His second Major League appearance came against the Boston Red Sox with the bases loaded, and Ted Williams standing in the batter's box. Brunet got Williams to bounce into a double play. Brunet made six appearances (one start) in 1956, recording a 7.00 ERA.

Brunet spent the next three seasons in the minors, making brief call ups in 1957 and 1959. Brunet was 14–15 with a 3.42 ERA and a league-leading 235 strikeouts in 33 games (31 starts) for the Double-A Little Rock Travelers in 1957. At one point, his record stood at 10–3, but over a stretch of over fifty innings in which his team failed to give him a single run of support, his record fell to 10–11.

One of the two games Brunet appeared in during 1959 was against the Chicago White Sox on April 22. He entered in the seventh inning with the bases loaded, and five runs already scored due to poor pitching and even worse fielding (five walks and three errors). Brunet walked the first two batters he faced, hit the next batter, then walked three more before Jim Landis grounded back to the mound. The ChiSox scored eleven runs that inning on just one hit.

Brunet finally made it onto Kansas City's opening day roster in 1960, but was traded to the Milwaukee Braves a month into the season for Bob Giggie.

=== Milwaukee Braves ===
The Braves originally assigned Brunet to the Louisville Colonels upon acquiring him, but he was quickly called up after going 4–1 with a 0.78 ERA in seven games (five starts). Brunet went 2–0 with a 5.07 ERA in 17 games (six starts) in his first season with the Braves. He again started 1961 in the majors, but was sidelined by an appendectomy after just one appearance. Brunet made four appearances when he returned that June, but was reassigned to the Triple-A Vancouver Mounties by the end of the month, and remained there for the rest of the season. On May 16, 1962, he was traded to the Houston Colt .45's for minor league pitcher Ben Johnson.

=== Houston Colt .45's and Baltimore Orioles ===
Brunet was terrible in his first two starts with Houston. He lasted a total of one inning, and was charged with six earned runs. He settled in for his next start, pitching a complete game against the Chicago Cubs in which he gave up just one unearned run. Brunet ended the season with a record of 2–4 and a 4.50 ERA in 17 games (11 starts).

The 1963 Baltimore Orioles were in the American League pennant race, but following Dean Stone's retirement, they had only one left hander in their bullpen, Pete Burnside. The team purchased Brunet's contract from Houston on July 14, 1963, and in his third appearance with the Orioles on July 18, he earned his first career save.

Brunet began the 1964 season assigned to the Orioles' Triple-A affiliate, the Rochester Red Wings, then was reacquired by the Colts on May 12. He was 10–6 with a 3.00 ERA in 21 games (18 starts) for the Colts' Triple-A affiliate, the Oklahoma City 89ers.

=== Los Angeles / California Angels ===
On August 18, 1964, Brunet's contract was again sold, this time to the Los Angeles Angels. After eleven seasons of bouncing around, Brunet seemed to have finally found a home in Los Angeles. He was immediately promoted to the Major Leagues upon his acquisition by the Angels. Brunet went 2–2 with a 3.61 ERA in 10 games (seven starts). One of those victories came on September 5 against his former club, the Orioles. He held the Orioles to four hits over seven innings before handing the ball over to Bob Lee for the save. The 1–0 victory knocked the Orioles out of first place.

Brunet's finest season in the majors was 1965, when he finished 9–11 with two saves and a 2.56 ERA in 41 appearances (26 starts). He split fourth starter duties for the newly renamed California Angels with Rudy May. The .209 batting average he held opposing batters to was the fourth-lowest in the league. By 1967, he was the Angels' top starter, but was a victim of hard luck. After a complete game victory in the season opener, Brunet lost his next nine decisions, a span during which the Angels only scored eighteen runs. In 1967 and 1968, he led the AL in losses with 19 and 17, respectively, despite relatively modest ERAs both seasons (3.31 and 2.86, respectively). He pitched back-to-back shutouts to earn his last two wins with the Angels on July 9 and July 14, 1969. On July 31, his contract was sold to the Seattle Pilots. Brunet's career with the Angels spanned over six seasons, his longest tenure with any club.

=== Ball Four ===
Brunet went 2–5 with a 5.37 ERA in 12 games (11 starts) for the Pilots in their only season in existence, however, he earns mention in Jim Bouton's account of the Seattle Pilots, Ball Four. Upon learning that the Pilots acquired Brunet, Bouton wrote, "The Pilots have just bought George Brunet from the Angels for something just over the waiver price. He'll fit right in on this ballclub. He's crazy."

The depth of his craziness is later revealed when Bouton discovers that Brunet doesn't wear underwear. He explains, "This way I don't have to worry about losing them."

On December 4, 1969, Brunet was traded to the Washington Senators for Dave Baldwin. He went 8–6 with a 4.42 ERA in 24 games (20 starts) for the Senators before a trade deadline deal brought him to the Pittsburgh Pirates for Denny Riddleberger. After finishing out the season in Pittsburgh, Brunet and Matty Alou were traded to the St. Louis Cardinals for Nelson Briles and Vic Davalillo. He appeared in seven games for the Cardinals, posting a 5.79 ERA before he was released. He caught on with the San Diego Padres shortly afterwards, and went 18–13 with a 4.02 ERA in two seasons with the Triple-A Hawaii Islanders. While with Hawaii, he received an offer to pitch in Japan, but declined, waiting on a call from the Minnesota Twins which never materialized. He spent one last season with the Philadelphia Phillies' Pacific Coast League affiliate, the Eugene Emeralds before retiring.

Brunet's minor league totals are 112 wins against 115 losses. He holds the minor league record for strikeouts with 3,175.

=== Mexico ===
Nicknamed "Lefty" and "Red" during his Major League career, he was known as "El Viejo" or "the Old Man" in Mexico as he pitched well into his fifties. His first stop in Mexico was Poza Rica, with Petroleros de Poza Rica. At 42 years old, on June 20, 1977, he pitched a no-hitter. He pitched for them through 1978, going 62–55 with a 2.55 ERA and actually spending part of the 1977 season as manager.

He split the 1979 season between the expansion Blue Coatzacoalcos and the Diablos Rojos del México. He was traded to Rojos del Águila de Veracruz before the start of the 1980 season, however, he returned to Blue Coatzacoalcos during the baseball strike that interrupted play for two weeks (Coatzacoalcos was one of six teams to play through the strike). He returned to Veracruz after the strike.

On June 10, 1984, he set the Mexican record for shutouts with 55. Brunet pitched until he was 54 years old, giving him a record 36 years of pitching in organized baseball. On October 25, 1991, Brunet died of a heart attack in Poza Rica, Veracruz, Mexico at the age of 56. In 1999, he was elected to the Mexican Professional Baseball Hall of Fame.
