= Minnie Rojas =

Cuban baseball player (1933–2002)

- Pitcher
- Born: November 26, 1933; Remedios, Cuba
- Died: March 23, 2002 (aged 68); Los Angeles, California, U.S.
- Batted: Right Threw: Right

MLB debut
- May 30, 1966, for the California Angels

Last MLB appearance
- July 24, 1968, for the California Angels

MLB statistics
- Win–loss record: 23-16
- Earned run average: 3.00
- Saves: 43
- Stats at Baseball Reference

Teams
- California Angels (1966–1968)

Career highlights and awards
- Led AL in saves (27 in 1967); AL Fireman of the Year (1967)

Minervino Alejandro "Minnie" Rojas Landin (November 26, 1933 – March 23, 2002) was a Cuban professional baseball player. He played in Major League Baseball (MLB) as a right-handed relief pitcher for the California Angels from 1966 to 1968 after many seasons pitching in the Mexican League, the minor leagues, and semi-pro leagues.

Rojas performed well in a relief role with the Angels as a 32-year-old rookie in 1966. He was named the AL Fireman of the Year in 1967 after winning 12 games and leading the American League (AL) with 27 saves, a franchise record that stood for 18 years. His effectiveness was reduced by injuries in 1968, and he missed the second half of the season with tendinitis and other arm issues. In 1969, Rojas pitched briefly in the minor leagues and the Mexican League in an attempt to regain his form, but lingering arm issues led him to retire from baseball without ever returning to the majors.

In 1970, Rojas and his family were involved in a serious automobile accident that killed two of his three children and left him partially paralyzed for the rest of his life. The California Angels organization and players held fundraisers to help their former teammate, including organizing a testimonial game for "Minnie Rojas Day" in 1971.

== Baseball career ==
=== Minor leagues / Mexican League ===
Rojas was born in Remedios, Villa Clara, Cuba. He showed promise as a baseball player in his youth, and after a year of compulsory military service, he left his native country to play semi-pro baseball in Mexico. In 1960, he signed a minor league contract with the San Francisco Giants. The Giants did not promote him to the majors after 4 years in their minor league system, so Rojas signed a free agent contract with the independent Jalisco Charros of the Mexican League in 1964.

In 1965, Rojas won 21 games as a starting pitcher for Jalisco, attracting the attention of the California Angels. The Angels bought his contract for $2500 and sent him to their AAA affiliate, the Seattle Rainiers, to begin the 1966 season. He was effective as both a starter and reliever against minor league competition, leading the Angels to call him up to the majors in late May.

=== California Angels ===
Rojas made his major league debut as a 32 year old rookie starting pitcher on May 30, 1966, against the Cleveland Indians and earned the win. Rojas would only make one additional start in the major leagues Instead, he became a valuable member of the Angels' bullpen at a time when the role of relief pitchers was evolving in the professional game. He appeared in 47 games and earned 10 saves as a 32-year-old rookie.

Rojas' best major league season was 1967, when he set an Angels franchise record with 27 saves that wasn't broken until Donnie Moore collected 31 saves in 1985. Rojas also won 12 games in relief that year and was a major reason that the Angels were surprising contenders for the American League pennant until mid-September. He was named the American League's Fireman of the Year and was 24th in the voting for American League MVP.

Rojas' effectiveness was reduced by injuries in 1968, and he missed the second half of the season. During the 1968 season, Rojas developed calcium deposits and tendonitis in his elbow, probably due to overwork during the many seasons leading up to his major league debut. He was placed on the disabled list in late July and was eventually shut down for the 1968 season without throwing another pitch.

Rojas attempted to resume his career in 1969 and threw 18 innings in the minor leagues and the Mexican League, but lingering arm issues continued, and he retired from baseball at the age of 35.

=== Scouting report ===
Rojas' pitching repertoire consisted mainly of breaking balls, changeups, and a sinking fastball. "He's got three pitches", one opposing batter commented, "slow, slower, and 'come and get it'." Despite his lack of a high-velocity pitch, Rojas was effective during his short MLB career due to excellent command and pitch movement. He posted a 23–16 record with a 3.00 ERA and 43 saves in 157 appearances, allowing only 45 unintentional walks in 261 innings over parts of three seasons.

== Accident ==
In 1970, Rojas and his family were involved in a serious automobile accident that killed two of his three children and left him partially paralyzed for the rest of his life. Around midnight on March 31, 1970, the Rojas family's station wagon was involved in a serious hit and run auto accident near Key Largo on the Overseas Highway after a fishing trip in the Florida Keys. Rojas' spinal cord was damaged, leaving him partially paralyzed, and his two young daughters, Lourdes and Barbara, were killed. His wife, Maria, and his infant son survived.

The Angels organization, led by team shortstop and Rojas' friend Jim Fregosi, started a fund to help Rojas and his surviving family. The team also held "Minnie Rojas Day" during a spring training exhibition game at Anaheim Stadium in March 1971 and donated the proceeds to the Rojas family. Through intense physical therapy, Rojas eventually regained some use of his upper body, but he would not walk again

Rojas died in Los Angeles on March 23, 2002, at the age of 68.

== See also ==
- List of Major League Baseball players from Cuba
- List of Major League Baseball annual saves leaders

== Sources ==
- Career statistics from Baseball Reference · Retrosheet · Baseball Almanac
