= Bill Kelso =

American baseball player (1940–2009)

- Relief pitcher
- Born: February 19, 1940; Kansas City, Missouri, U.S.
- Died: May 11, 2009 (aged 69); North Kansas City, Missouri, U.S.
- Batted: Right Threw: Right

MLB debut
- July 31, 1964, for the Los Angeles Angels

Last MLB appearance
- September 28, 1968, for the Cincinnati Reds

MLB statistics
- Win–loss record: 12–5
- Earned run average: 3.13
- Strikeouts: 162
- Stats at Baseball Reference

Teams
- Los Angeles Angels (1964); California Angels (1966–1967); Cincinnati Reds (1968)

William Eugene Kelso (February 19, 1940 – May 11, 2009) was an American professional baseball player who played four seasons for the Los Angeles/California Angels and Cincinnati Reds of Major League Baseball.

== Early life ==
A multi-sport athlete at North Kansas City High School in Kansas City, Missouri from which he graduated in 1958, he was a three-year letter-winner in baseball, football and basketball and earned one letter in track. He was all-state his senior year in both football and basketball. He was on the 1957 basketball team that reached the Missouri state finals. He was also a member of amateur baseball's Ban Johnson League Hall of Fame.

== Career ==
He earned a scholarship to the University of Kansas and while attending there he was signed by the Los Angeles Dodgers as an amateur free agent in 1962. He was drafted by the Angels in the December 1963 Rule 5 draft. He made his major-league debut at age 24 on July 31, 1964. Pitching in relief of starter Aubrey Gatewood against the Boston Red Sox, Kelso entered the game in the fifth inning and struck out the first batter he faced, Frank Malzone. In 2.2 innings, he game up no runs and one hit with two strikeouts and three walks in the 4-3 Angels loss at Dodger Stadium.

Kelso spent parts of three seasons with the Angels during 1964, 1966 and 1967 seasons. His most productive year was 1967, when he was 5–3 with a 2.97 earned run average in 69 games pitched (which was third in the American League).

He pitched for the Reds in 1968, with a record of 4-1 and an ERA of 3.98 in 35 games. He ended his playing career with a 12–5 record with a 3.13 ERA and 162 strikeouts in 119 games and 201.1 innings pitched.

After his playing career ended, Kelso was a scout for 29 years with teams including the Angels, Philadelphia Phillies and Houston Astros. His last 14 years of scouting was as National Scouting Supervisor for the Astros. Notable finds included former Phillies outfielder Bobby Dernier and current St. Louis Cardinals first baseman Lance Berkman and current Texas Rangers pitcher Roy Oswalt.

Kelso's Pizza & Pub pizza parlor in Liberty, Missouri was a popular hangout for Kansas City Chiefs players when the football team was in training at William Jewell College. He also coached the Ironman baseball team in Kansas City and several other amateur and youth teams. He was a 2005 inductee of the North Kansas City High School Alumni Hall of Fame.

== Death ==
Kelso died in North Kansas City, Missouri on May 11, 2009. He was survived by his wife Celine, children Kelly Kelso, Jeff Kelso and his wife Chandra, Kirby Kelso, Krae Kelso; grandchildren Kelsey Rigg, Pollie Rigg, Sophia Rigg, Adrienne Kelso, Bianca Abbate, Bo Kelso; and his brother Cecil Reed and his wife Patricia; any other family.
