= 1966 Chicago White Sox season =

1966 Chicago White Sox
- League: American League
- Ballpark: White Sox Park
- City: Chicago
- Record: 83–79 (.512)
- League place: 4th
- Owners: Arthur Allyn, Jr., John Allyn
- General managers: Ed Short
- Managers: Eddie Stanky
- Television: WGN-TV (Jack Brickhouse, Lloyd Pettit)
- Radio: WCFL (Bob Elson, Bob Finnegan)

The 1966 Chicago White Sox season was the team's 66th season in the major leagues, and its 67th season overall. Eddie Stanky managed the White Sox to a fourth-place finish in the American League with a record of 83–79, 15 games behind the first-place Baltimore Orioles.

== Regular season ==
=== Season standings ===
American League
Team	W	L	Pct.	GB	Home	Road
Baltimore Orioles	97	63	.606	—	48‍–‍31	49‍–‍32
Minnesota Twins	89	73	.549	9	49‍–‍32	40‍–‍41
Detroit Tigers	88	74	.543	10	42‍–‍39	46‍–‍35
Chicago White Sox	83	79	.512	15	45‍–‍36	38‍–‍43
Cleveland Indians	81	81	.500	17	41‍–‍40	40‍–‍41
California Angels	80	82	.494	18	42‍–‍39	38‍–‍43
Kansas City Athletics	74	86	.463	23	42‍–‍39	32‍–‍47
Washington Senators	71	88	.447	25½	42‍–‍36	29‍–‍52
Boston Red Sox	72	90	.444	26	40‍–‍41	32‍–‍49
New York Yankees	70	89	.440	26½	35‍–‍46	35‍–‍43

=== Record vs. opponents ===
1966 American League record Sources:
Team	BAL	BOS	CAL	CWS	CLE	DET	KCA	MIN	NYY	WAS
Baltimore	—	12–6	12–6	9–9	8–10	9–9	11–5	10–8	15–3	11–7
Boston	6–12	—	9–9	11–7	7–11	8–10	9–9	6–12	8–10	8–10
California	6–12	9–9	—	8–10	10–8	9–9	9–9	11–7	11–7	7–11
Chicago	9–9	7–11	10–8	—	11–7	8–10	13–5	4–14	9–9–1	12–6
Cleveland	10–8	11–7	8–10	7–11	—	9–9	6–12	9–9	12–6	9–9
Detroit	9–9	10–8	9–9	10–8	9–9	—	6–12	11–7	11–7	13–5
Kansas City	5–11	9–9	9–9	5–13	12–6	12–6	—	8–10	5–13	9–9
Minnesota	8–10	12–6	7–11	14–4	9–9	7–11	10–8	—	8–10	14–4
New York	3–15	10–8	7–11	9–9–1	6–12	7–11	13–5	10–8	—	5–10
Washington	7–11	10–8	11–7	6–12	9–9	5–13	9–9	4–14	10–5	—

=== Opening Day lineup ===
- Don Buford, 3B
- Floyd Robinson, RF
- Pete Ward, LF
- Johnny Romano, C
- Tommy McCraw, 1B
- Ron Hansen, SS
- Tommie Agee, CF
- Al Weis, 2B
- Tommy John, P

=== Notable transactions ===
- May 27, 1966: Danny Cater was traded by the White Sox to the Kansas City Athletics for Wayne Causey.
- June 7, 1966: 1966 Major League Baseball draft
  - Carlos May was drafted by the White Sox in the 1st round (18th pick).
  - Johnny Oates was drafted by the White Sox in the 2nd round, but did not sign.
  - Ken Frailing was drafted by the White Sox in the 5th round. Player signed June 25, 1966.
  - Chuck Brinkman was drafted by the White Sox in the 16th round.
  - Geoff Zahn was drafted by the White Sox in the 34th round, but did not sign.

=== Roster ===
1966 Chicago White Sox
Roster
Pitchers: 47 Greg Bollo; 30 John Buzhardt; 28 Eddie Fisher; 41 Dennis Higgins; 20 Joe Horlen; 19 Bruce Howard; 25 Tommy John; 27 Fred Klages; 45,36 Jack Lamabe; 23 Bob Locker; 43 Gary Peters; 32 Juan Pizarro; 31 Hoyt Wilhelm	Catchers: 2 Smoky Burgess; 46 Duane Josephson; 10 J. C. Martin; 15 Jerry McNertney; 5 Johnny Romano; Infielders: 11 Jerry Adair; 7 Don Buford; 9 Wayne Causey; 49 Lee Elia; 18 Gene Freese; 4 Ron Hansen; 26 Dick Kenworthy; 24 Tommy McCraw; 14 Bill Skowron; 29 Marv Staehle; 6 Al Weis	Outfielders: 1 Tommie Agee; 16 Ken Berry; 54 Buddy Bradford; 9 Danny Cater; 44 Jim Hicks; 3 Floyd Robinson; 40 Ed Stroud; 17 Bill Voss; 8 Pete Ward; Other batters: 50 Deacon Jones	Manager: 12 Eddie Stanky; Coaches: 37 Ray Berres; 33 Tony Cuccinello; 34 Kerby Farrell; 39 Don Gutteridge

== Player stats ==
=== Batting ===
Note: G = Games played; AB = At bats; R = Runs scored; H = Hits; 2B = Doubles; 3B = Triples; HR = Home runs; RBI = Runs batted in; BB = Base on balls; SO = Strikeouts; AVG = Batting average; SB = Stolen bases

Player	G	AB	R	H	2B	3B	HR	RBI	BB	SO	AVG	SB
Jerry Adair, SS, 2B	105	370	27	90	18	2	4	36	17	44	.243	3
Tommie Agee, CF, LF	160	629	98	172	27	8	22	86	41	127	.273	44
Ken Berry, LF, RF, CF	147	443	50	120	20	2	8	34	28	63	.271	7
Buddy Bradford, LF, RF	14	28	3	4	0	0	0	0	2	6	.143	0
Don Buford, 3B, 2B, LF, RF	163	607	85	148	26	7	8	52	69	71	.244	51
Smoky Burgess, C	79	67	0	21	5	0	0	15	11	8	.313	0
Danny Cater, LF, RF	21	60	3	11	1	1	0	4	0	10	.183	3
Wayne Causey, 2B	78	164	23	40	8	2	0	13	24	13	.244	2
Lee Elia, SS	80	195	16	40	5	2	3	22	15	39	.205	0
Gene Freese, 3B	48	106	8	22	2	0	3	10	8	20	.208	2
Ron Hansen, SS	23	74	3	13	1	0	0	4	15	10	.176	0
Jim Hicks, RF, 1B, LF	18	26	3	5	0	1	0	1	1	5	.192	0
Deacon Jones, PH	5	5	0	2	0	0	0	0	0	0	.400	0
Duane Josephson, C	11	38	3	9	1	0	0	3	3	3	.237	0
Dick Kenworthy, 3B	9	25	1	5	0	0	0	0	0	0	.200	0
J. C. Martin, C	67	157	13	40	5	3	2	20	14	24	.255	0
Jerry McNertney, C	44	59	3	13	0	0	0	1	7	6	.220	1
Tommy McCraw, 1B, LF, RF	151	389	49	89	16	4	5	48	29	40	.229	20
Floyd Robinson, RF	127	342	44	81	11	2	5	35	44	32	.237	8
Johnny Romano, C	122	329	33	76	12	0	15	47	58	72	.231	0
Bill Skowron, 1B	120	337	27	84	15	2	6	29	26	45	.249	1
Marv Staehle, 2B	8	15	2	2	0	0	0	0	4	2	.133	1
Ed Stroud, RF, LF	12	36	3	6	2	0	0	1	2	8	.167	3
Bill Voss, LF	2	2	0	0	0	0	0	0	0	2	.000	0
Pete Ward, LF, RF, 3B, 1B	84	251	22	55	7	1	3	28	24	49	.219	3
Al Weis, 2B, SS	129	187	20	29	4	1	0	9	17	50	.155	3

Player	G	AB	R	H	2B	3B	HR	RBI	BB	SO	AVG	SB
Greg Bollo, P	3	1	0	0	0	0	0	0	0	1	.000	0
John Buzhardt, P	34	43	0	5	0	0	0	2	2	18	.116	0
Eddie Fisher, P	23	2	0	0	0	0	0	0	0	1	.000	0
Dennis Higgins, P	42	17	1	3	0	0	0	1	1	4	.176	0
Joe Horlen, P	64	60	6	4	0	0	0	1	2	12	.067	1
Bruce Howard, P	27	43	2	3	1	0	0	2	5	13	.070	0
Tommy John, P	34	69	6	10	1	0	2	8	3	21	.145	0
Fred Klages, P	3	6	1	3	0	0	0	1	0	2	.500	0
Jack Lamabe, P	34	35	2	2	0	0	0	0	1	16	.057	0
Bob Locker, P	56	16	3	4	0	0	0	0	2	7	.250	0
Gary Peters, P	38	81	12	19	3	2	1	9	0	19	.235	0
Juan Pizarro, P	34	26	2	4	1	0	0	2	1	5	.154	0
Hoyt Wilhelm, P	46	8	0	1	1	0	0	0	0	4	.125	0
Team totals	163	5348	574	1235	193	40	87	524	476	872	.231	153

=== Pitching ===
Note: W = Wins; L = Losses; ERA = Earned run average; G = Games pitched; GS = Games started; SV = Saves; IP = Innings pitched; H = Hits allowed; R = Runs allowed; ER = Earned runs allowed; HR = Home runs allowed; BB = Walks allowed; K = Strikeouts

Player	W	L	ERA	G	GS	SV	IP	H	R	ER	HR	BB	K
Greg Bollo	0	1	2.57	3	1	0	7.0	7	2	2	0	3	4
John Buzhardt	6	11	3.83	33	22	1	150.1	144	74	64	13	34	66
Eddie Fisher	1	3	2.29	23	0	6	35.1	27	11	9	1	18	18
Dennis Higgins	1	0	2.52	42	1	5	93.0	66	27	26	9	37	86
Joe Horlen	10	13	2.43	37	29	1	211.0	185	64	57	14	64	124
Bruce Howard	9	5	2.30	27	21	0	149.0	110	48	38	14	46	85
Tommy John	14	11	2.62	34	33	0	223.0	195	76	65	13	61	138
Fred Klages	1	0	1.72	3	3	0	15.2	9	4	3	0	7	6
Jack Lamabe	7	9	3.93	34	17	0	121.1	116	55	53	9	36	67
Bob Locker	9	8	2.46	56	0	12	95.0	73	32	26	2	36	70
Gary Peters	12	10	1.98	30	27	0	204.2	156	54	45	11	51	129
Juan Pizarro	8	6	3.76	34	9	3	88.2	91	49	37	9	46	42
Hoyt Wilhelm	5	2	1.66	46	0	6	81.1	50	21	15	6	19	61
Team totals	83	79	2.68	163	163	34	1475.1	1229	517	440	101	458	896

== Farm system ==
Level	Team	League	Manager
AAA	Indianapolis Indians	Pacific Coast League	Les Moss
AA	Evansville White Sox	Southern League	George Noga
A	Lynchburg White Sox	Carolina League	Ira Hutchinson
A	Deerfield Beach/Winter Haven Sun Sox	Florida State League	Don Bacon and Bruce Andrew
A	Fox Cities Foxes	Midwest League	Stan Wasiak
Rookie	GCL White Sox	Gulf Coast League	Frank Parenti

LEAGUE CHAMPIONS: Fox Cities

Deerfield Beach franchise moved to Winter Haven, June 27, 1966
