= 1967 Chicago White Sox season =

1967 Chicago White Sox
- League: American League
- Ballpark: White Sox Park
- City: Chicago
- Record: 89–73 (.549)
- League place: 4th
- Owners: Arthur Allyn, Jr., John Allyn
- General managers: Ed Short
- Managers: Eddie Stanky
- Television: WGN-TV (Jack Brickhouse, Lloyd Pettit)
- Radio: WMAQ (AM) (Bob Elson, Red Rush)

The 1967 season was the Chicago White Sox' 67th season in the major leagues, and its 68th season overall. They finished with a record of 89–73, good enough for fourth place in the American League, 3 games behind the first-place Boston Red Sox. The team's earned run average (ERA) of 2.45 is the lowest in the live-ball era (1920 onwards). They trailed by one game for the pennant with five games to go but lost the next five.

== Offseason ==
- October 17, 1966: Smoky Burgess was released by the White Sox.
- October and November 1966: In separate transactions, Wilbur Wood was sold by the Pirates to the Chicago White Sox. The White Sox also sold Juan Pizarro to the Pirates.
- December 14, 1966: Johnny Romano and Lee White (minors) were traded by the White Sox to the St. Louis Cardinals for Walt Williams and Don Dennis.

== Regular season ==
=== Opening Day lineup ===
- Walt Williams, LF
- Don Buford, 3B
- Tommie Agee, CF
- Pete Ward, 1B
- Ken Berry, RF
- Jerry McNertney, C
- Ron Hansen, SS
- Jerry Adair, 2B
- John Buzhardt, P

=== Season standings ===
American League
Team	W	L	Pct.	GB	Home	Road
Boston Red Sox	92	70	.568	—	49‍–‍32	43‍–‍38
Detroit Tigers	91	71	.562	1	52‍–‍29	39‍–‍42
Minnesota Twins	91	71	.562	1	52‍–‍29	39‍–‍42
Chicago White Sox	89	73	.549	3	49‍–‍33	40‍–‍40
California Angels	84	77	.522	7½	53‍–‍30	31‍–‍47
Washington Senators	76	85	.472	15½	40‍–‍40	36‍–‍45
Baltimore Orioles	76	85	.472	15½	35‍–‍42	41‍–‍43
Cleveland Indians	75	87	.463	17	36‍–‍45	39‍–‍42
New York Yankees	72	90	.444	20	43‍–‍38	29‍–‍52
Kansas City Athletics	62	99	.385	29½	37‍–‍44	25‍–‍55

=== Record vs. opponents ===
1967 American League record Sources:
Team	BAL	BOS	CAL	CWS	CLE	DET	KCA	MIN	NYY	WAS
Baltimore	—	10–8	6–11	7–11	9–9	3–15	10–8	8–10	13–5	10–8
Boston	8–10	—	10–8	8–10	13–5	11–7	12–6	7–11	12–6	11–7
California	11–6	8–10	—	7–11	14–4	8–10	14–4	7–11	9–9	6–12
Chicago	11–7	10–8	11–7	—	12–6	8–10	8–10	9–9	12–6	8–10
Cleveland	9–9	5–13	4–14	6–12	—	8–10	11–7	10–8	9–9	13–5
Detroit	15–3	7–11	10–8	10–8	10–8	—	12–6	8–10–1	10–8	9–9
Kansas City	8–10	6–12	4–14	10–8	7–11	6–12	—	8–10	7–11	6–11
Minnesota	10–8	11–7	11–7	9–9	8–10	10–8–1	10–8	—	12–6–1	10–8
New York	5–13	6–12	9–9	6–12	9–9	8–10	11–7	6–12–1	—	12–6
Washington	8–10	7–11	12–6	10–8	5–13	9–9	11–6	8–10	6–12	—

=== Notable transactions ===
- May 6, 1967: Bill Skowron was traded by the White Sox to the California Angels for Cotton Nash and cash.
- June 15, 1967: Ed Stroud was traded by the White Sox to the Washington Senators for Jim King.
- July 22, 1967: Bill Southworth and a player to be named later were traded by the White Sox to the New York Mets for Ken Boyer and a player to be named later. The Mets completed their part of the deal by sending Sandy Alomar Sr. to the White Sox on August 15. The White Sox completed their part of the deal by sending J. C. Martin to the Mets on November 27.

=== Roster ===
1967 Chicago White Sox
Roster
Pitchers: 30 John Buzhardt; 30 Cisco Carlos; 41 Dennis Higgins; 20 Joe Horlen; 19 Bruce Howard; 25 Tommy John; 39 Steve Jones; 27 Fred Klages; 36 Jack Lamabe; 23 Bob Locker; 44 Don McMahon; 17 Aurelio Monteagudo; 48 Roger Nelson; 18,21 Jim O'Toole; 43 Gary Peters; 31 Hoyt Wilhelm; 28 Wilbur Wood	Catchers: 42 Ed Herrmann; 5 Duane Josephson; 10 J. C. Martin; 15 Jerry McNertney; Infielders: 11 Jerry Adair; 11 Sandy Alomar Sr.; 14 Ken Boyer; 7 Don Buford; 9 Wayne Causey; 4 Ron Hansen; 26 Dick Kenworthy; 24 Tommy McCraw; 17 Rich Morales; 50 Cotton Nash; 29 Marv Staehle; 6 Al Weis	Outfielders: 1 Tommie Agee; 16 Ken Berry; 32 Buddy Bradford; 18 Rocky Colavito; 18 Jim King; 11 Jimmy Stewart; 17 Ed Stroud; 22 Bill Voss; 8 Pete Ward; 3 Walt Williams; Other batters: 2 Smoky Burgess; 14 Bill Skowron	Manager: 12 Eddie Stanky; Coaches: 34 Kerby Farrell; 35 Marv Grissom; 33 Les Moss; 37 Grover Resinger

== Player stats ==
=== Batting ===
Note: G = Games played; AB = At bats; R = Runs scored; H = Hits; 2B = Doubles; 3B = Triples; HR = Home runs; RBI = Runs batted in; BB = Base on balls; SO = Strikeouts; AVG = Batting average; SB = Stolen bases

Player	G	AB	R	H	2B	3B	HR	RBI	BB	SO	AVG	SB
Jerry Adair, 2B	28	98	6	20	4	0	0	9	4	17	.204	0
Tommie Agee, CF, LF, RF	158	529	73	124	26	2	14	52	44	129	.234	28
Sandy Alomar Sr., SS, 2B	12	15	4	3	0	0	0	0	2	0	.200	2
Ken Berry, RF, CF, LF	147	485	49	117	14	4	7	41	46	68	.241	9
Ken Boyer, 3B, 1B	57	180	17	47	5	1	4	21	7	25	.261	0
Buddy Bradford, OF	24	20	6	2	1	0	0	1	1	7	.100	1
Don Buford, 3B, 2B	156	535	61	129	10	9	4	32	65	51	.241	34
Smoky Burgess, PH	77	60	2	8	1	0	2	11	14	8	.133	0
Wayne Causey, 2B	124	292	21	66	10	3	1	28	32	35	.226	2
Rocky Colavito, RF, LF	60	190	20	42	4	1	3	29	25	10	.221	1
Ron Hansen, SS	157	498	35	116	20	0	8	51	64	51	.233	0
Ed Herrmann, C	2	3	1	2	1	0	0	1	1	0	.667	0
Duane Josephson, C	62	189	11	45	5	1	1	9	6	24	.238	0
Dick Kenworthy, 3B	50	97	9	22	4	1	4	11	4	17	.227	0
Jim King, OF	23	50	2	6	1	0	0	2	4	16	.120	0
J. C. Martin, C	101	252	22	59	12	1	4	22	30	41	.234	4
Jerry McNertney, C	56	123	8	28	6	0	3	13	6	14	.228	0
Tommy McCraw, 1B, CF	125	453	55	107	18	3	11	45	33	55	.236	24
Rich Morales, SS	8	10	0	0	0	0	0	0	0	2	.000	0
Cotton Nash, 1B	3	3	1	0	0	0	0	0	1	0	.000	0
Bill Skowron, PH	8	8	0	0	0	0	0	1	0	1	.000	0
Marv Staehle, 2B, SS	32	54	1	6	1	0	0	1	4	8	.111	1
Jimmy Stewart, 2B, LF	24	18	5	3	0	0	0	1	1	6	.167	1
Ed Stroud, LF, RF	20	27	6	8	0	1	0	3	1	5	.296	7
Bill Voss, OF	13	22	4	2	0	0	0	0	0	1	.091	1
Pete Ward, LF, 1B, RF, 3B	146	467	49	109	16	2	18	62	61	109	.233	3
Al Weis, 2B, SS	50	53	9	13	2	0	0	4	1	7	.245	3
Walt Williams, LF, RF	104	275	35	66	16	3	3	15	17	20	.240	3

Player	G	AB	R	H	2B	3B	HR	RBI	BB	SO	AVG	SB
John Buzhardt, P	28	20	0	4	0	0	0	2	0	7	.200	0
Cisco Carlos, P	8	16	0	1	0	0	0	0	0	7	.063	0
Dennis Higgins, P	9	1	0	0	0	0	0	0	0	0	.000	0
Joe Horlen, P	51	83	8	14	1	0	0	5	1	14	.169	0
Bruce Howard, P	30	28	1	5	1	0	0	0	1	9	.179	0
Tommy John, P	31	51	0	8	0	0	0	2	1	12	.157	0
Steve Jones, P	11	4	0	1	1	0	0	0	0	1	.250	0
Fred Klages, P	12	12	0	0	0	0	0	1	0	8	.000	0
Bob Locker, P	77	10	0	0	0	0	0	0	0	6	.000	0
Don McMahon, P	52	11	0	2	0	0	0	0	0	8	.182	0
Jim O'Toole, P	15	13	0	1	0	0	0	1	0	5	.077	0
Gary Peters, P	48	99	10	21	0	2	2	13	2	23	.212	0
Hoyt Wilhelm, P	49	13	0	1	0	0	0	1	0	11	.077	0
Wilbur Wood, P	51	16	0	1	1	0	0	1	1	11	.063	0
Team totals	162	5383	531	1209	181	34	89	491	480	849	.225	124

=== Pitching ===
Note: W = Wins; L = Losses; ERA = Earned run average; G = Games pitched; GS = Games started; SV = Saves; IP = Innings pitched; H = Hits allowed; R = Runs allowed; ER = Earned runs allowed; HR = Home runs allowed; BB = Walks allowed; K = Strikeouts

Player	W	L	ERA	G	GS	SV	IP	H	R	ER	HR	BB	K
John Buzhardt	3	9	3.96	28	7	0	88.2	100	44	39	11	42	33
Cisco Carlos	2	0	0.86	8	7	0	41.2	23	5	4	0	9	27
Dennis Higgins	1	2	5.84	9	0	0	12.1	13	9	8	0	10	8
Joe Horlen	19	7	2.06	35	35	0	258.0	188	66	59	13	62	103
Bruce Howard	3	10	3.43	30	17	0	112.2	102	55	43	9	53	76
Tommy John	10	13	2.47	31	29	0	178.1	143	62	49	12	54	110
Steve Jones	2	2	4.21	11	3	0	25.2	21	13	12	1	12	17
Fred Klages	4	4	3.83	11	9	0	44.2	43	19	19	6	17	17
Jack Lamabe	1	0	1.80	3	0	0	5.0	7	2	1	0	2	3
Bob Locker	7	5	2.09	77	0	20	124.2	102	34	29	5	28	80
Don McMahon	5	0	1.67	52	0	3	91.2	54	21	17	5	31	74
Aurelio Monteagudo	0	1	20.25	1	1	0	1.1	4	3	3	1	2	0
Roger Nelson	0	1	1.29	5	0	0	7.0	4	1	1	1	0	4
Jim O'Toole	4	3	2.82	15	10	0	54.1	53	21	17	4	20	37
Gary Peters	16	11	2.28	38	36	0	260.0	187	81	66	15	99	215
Hoyt Wilhelm	8	3	1.31	49	0	12	89.0	58	21	13	2	38	76
Wilbur Wood	4	2	2.45	51	8	4	95.1	95	34	26	2	32	47
Team totals	89	73	2.45	162	162	39	1490.1	1197	491	406	87	511	927

== Awards and honors ==
- 1967 MLB All-Star Game
  - Tommie Agee, reserve
  - Ken Berry, reserve
  - Joe Horlen, reserve
  - Gary Peters, reserve

== Farm system ==
Level	Team	League	Manager
AAA	Indianapolis Indians	Pacific Coast League	Don Gutteridge
AA	Evansville White Sox	Southern League	George Noga
A	Lynchburg White Sox	Carolina League	Stan Wasiak
A	Appleton Foxes	Midwest League	Alex Cosmidis
A-Short Season	Duluth–Superior Dukes	Northern League	Ira Hutchinson
Rookie	GCL White Sox	Gulf Coast League	Bruce Andrew

LEAGUE CHAMPIONS: Appleton
Duluth-Superior affiliation shared with Chicago Cubs
