= 1965 Chicago White Sox season =

1965 Chicago White Sox
- League: American League
- Ballpark: White Sox Park
- City: Chicago
- Record: 95–67 (.586)
- League place: 2nd
- Owners: Arthur Allyn, Jr., John Allyn
- General managers: Ed Short
- Managers: Al López
- Television: WGN-TV (Jack Brickhouse, Lloyd Pettit)
- Radio: WCFL (Bob Elson, Milo Hamilton)

The 1965 Chicago White Sox season was the team's 65th season in the major leagues, and its 66th season overall. They finished with a record of 95–67, good enough for second place in the American League, seven games behind the first-place Minnesota Twins. This would be Al Lopez's final full season as White Sox manager.

== Offseason ==
- October 15, 1964: Rudy May was traded by the White Sox to the Philadelphia Phillies for Bill Heath and a player to be named later. The Phillies completed the deal by sending Joel Gibson (minors) to the White Sox on November 23.
- October 19, 1964: Don Mossi was released by the White Sox.
- December 1, 1964: Ray Herbert and Jeoff Long were traded by the White Sox to the Philadelphia Phillies for Danny Cater and Lee Elia.
- January 20, 1965: Cam Carreon was traded by the White Sox to the Cleveland Indians, and Jim Landis, Mike Hershberger and a player to be named later were traded by the White Sox to the Kansas City Athletics as part of a three-team trade. Tommy John, Tommie Agee and Johnny Romano were traded by the Indians to the White Sox, and Rocky Colavito was traded by the Athletics to the Indians. The White Sox completed the deal by sending Fred Talbot to the Athletics on February 10.

== Regular season ==
=== Season standings ===
American League
| Team | W | L | Pct. | GB | Home | Road |
|---|---|---|---|---|---|---|
| Minnesota Twins | 102 | 60 | .630 | — | 51‍–‍30 | 51‍–‍30 |
| Chicago White Sox | 95 | 67 | .586 | 7 | 48‍–‍33 | 47‍–‍34 |
| Baltimore Orioles | 94 | 68 | .580 | 8 | 46‍–‍33 | 48‍–‍35 |
| Detroit Tigers | 89 | 73 | .549 | 13 | 47‍–‍34 | 42‍–‍39 |
| Cleveland Indians | 87 | 75 | .537 | 15 | 52‍–‍30 | 35‍–‍45 |
| New York Yankees | 77 | 85 | .475 | 25 | 40‍–‍43 | 37‍–‍42 |
| Los Angeles / California Angels | 75 | 87 | .463 | 27 | 46‍–‍34 | 29‍–‍53 |
| Washington Senators | 70 | 92 | .432 | 32 | 36‍–‍45 | 34‍–‍47 |
| Boston Red Sox | 62 | 100 | .383 | 40 | 34‍–‍47 | 28‍–‍53 |
| Kansas City Athletics | 59 | 103 | .364 | 43 | 33‍–‍48 | 26‍–‍55 |

=== Record vs. opponents ===
1965 American League record Sources:
| Team | BAL | BOS | CWS | CLE | DET | KCA | LAA | MIN | NYY | WAS |
|---|---|---|---|---|---|---|---|---|---|---|
| Baltimore | — | 11–7 | 9–9 | 10–8 | 11–7 | 11–7 | 13–5 | 8–10 | 13–5 | 8–10 |
| Boston | 7–11 | — | 4–14 | 8–10 | 6–12 | 11–7 | 5–13 | 1–17 | 9–9 | 11–7 |
| Chicago | 9–9 | 14–4 | — | 10–8 | 9–9 | 13–5 | 12–6 | 7–11 | 8–10 | 13–5 |
| Cleveland | 8–10 | 10–8 | 8–10 | — | 9–9 | 9–9 | 9–9 | 11–7 | 12–6 | 11–7 |
| Detroit | 7–11 | 12–6 | 9–9 | 9–9 | — | 13–5 | 10–8 | 8–10 | 10–8 | 11–7 |
| Kansas City | 7–11 | 7–11 | 5–13 | 9–9 | 5–13 | — | 5–13 | 8–10 | 7–11 | 6–12 |
| Los Angeles / California | 5–13 | 13–5 | 6–12 | 9–9 | 8–10 | 13–5 | — | 9–9 | 6–12 | 6–12 |
| Minnesota | 10–8 | 17–1 | 11–7 | 7–11 | 10–8 | 10–8 | 9–9 | — | 13–5 | 15–3 |
| New York | 5–13 | 9–9 | 10–8 | 6–12 | 8–10 | 11–7 | 12–6 | 5–13 | — | 11–7 |
| Washington | 10–8 | 7–11 | 5–13 | 7–11 | 7–11 | 12–6 | 12–6 | 3–15 | 7–11 | — |

NOTE: The Los Angeles Angels changed their name to California Angels on September 2, 1965, with the season in progress.

=== Opening Day lineup ===
- Don Buford, 2B
- Floyd Robinson, RF
- Johnny Romano, C
- Pete Ward, 3B
- Ron Hansen, SS
- Bill Skowron, 1B
- Danny Cater, LF
- Ken Berry, CF
- Gary Peters, P

=== Notable transactions ===
- June 8, 1965: Danny Lazar was drafted by the White Sox in the 31st round of the 1965 Major League Baseball draft.

=== Roster ===
1965 Chicago White Sox
Roster
| Pitchers: 47 Greg Bollo; 30 John Buzhardt; 28 Eddie Fisher; 20 Joe Horlen; 19 Bruce Howard; 25 Tommy John; 17 Frank Lary; 23 Bob Locker; 43 Gary Peters; 32 Juan Pizarro; 31 Hoyt Wilhelm; 26 Ted Wills | Catchers: 2 Smoky Burgess; 46 Duane Josephson; 12 J. C. Martin; 5 Johnny Romano; 18 Jimmie Schaffer; Infielders: 7 Don Buford; 18 Gene Freese; 4 Ron Hansen; 24 Tommy McCraw; 14 Bill Skowron; 8 Pete Ward; 6 Al Weis | Outfielders: 1 Tommie Agee; 17,16 Ken Berry; 9 Danny Cater; 44 Jim Hicks; 11 Dave Nicholson; 3 Floyd Robinson; 40 Bill Voss; Other batters: 34 Bill Heath; 26 Dick Kenworthy; 29 Marv Staehle | Manager: 10 Al López; Coaches: 37 Ray Berres; 33 Tony Cuccinello; 39 Don Gutteridge; 36 Charlie Metro |

== Game log ==
=== Regular season ===
Legend
| | White Sox win |
| | White Sox loss |
| | Postponement |
| | Eliminated from playoff race |
| **Bold** | White Sox team member |

1965 regular season game log: 95–67 (home: 48–33; away: 47–34)
April: 8–4 (home: 4–3; away: 4–1)

| # | Date | Time (CT) | Opponent | Score | Win | Loss | Save | Time of Game | Attendance | Record | Streak |

May: 19–12 (home: 11–5; away: 8–7)

| # | Date | Time (CT) | Opponent | Score | Win | Loss | Save | Time of Game | Attendance | Record | Streak |

June: 15–13 (home: 7–5; away: 8–8)

| # | Date | Time (CT) | Opponent | Score | Win | Loss | Save | Time of Game | Attendance | Record | Streak |

July: 12–16 (home: 7–5; away: 5–11)

| # | Date | Time (CT) | Opponent | Score | Win | Loss | Save | Time of Game | Attendance | Record | Streak |
|---|---|---|---|---|---|---|---|---|---|---|---|
| — | July 13 | 1:00 p.m. CDT | **36th All-Star Game in Bloomington, MN** | | | | | | | | |

August: 22–12 (home: 12–9; away: 10–3)

| # | Date | Time (CT) | Opponent | Score | Win | Loss | Save | Time of Game | Attendance | Record | Streak |

September: 16–10 (home: 4–6; away: 12–4)

| # | Date | Time (CT) | Opponent | Score | Win | Loss | Save | Time of Game | Attendance | Record | Streak |

October: 3–0 (home: 3–0; away: 0–0)

| # | Date | Time (CT) | Opponent | Score | Win | Loss | Save | Time of Game | Attendance | Record | Streak |

== Player stats ==
=== Batting ===
Note: G = Games played; AB = At bats; R = Runs scored; H = Hits; 2B = Doubles; 3B = Triples; HR = Home runs; RBI = Runs batted in; BB = Base on balls; SO = Strikeouts; AVG = Batting average; SB = Stolen bases

| Player | G | AB | R | H | 2B | 3B | HR | RBI | BB | SO | AVG | SB |
|---|---|---|---|---|---|---|---|---|---|---|---|---|
| Tommie Agee, CF, RF | 10 | 19 | 2 | 3 | 1 | 0 | 0 | 3 | 2 | 6 | .158 | 0 |
| Ken Berry, CF | 157 | 472 | 51 | 103 | 17 | 4 | 12 | 42 | 28 | 96 | .218 | 4 |
| Don Buford, 2B, 3B | 155 | 586 | 93 | 166 | 22 | 5 | 10 | 47 | 67 | 76 | .283 | 17 |
| Smoky Burgess, C | 80 | 77 | 2 | 22 | 4 | 0 | 2 | 24 | 11 | 7 | .286 | 0 |
| Danny Cater, LF, 3B | 142 | 514 | 74 | 139 | 18 | 4 | 14 | 55 | 33 | 65 | .270 | 3 |
| Gene Freese, 3B | 17 | 32 | 2 | 9 | 0 | 1 | 1 | 4 | 5 | 9 | .281 | 0 |
| Ron Hansen, SS | 162 | 587 | 61 | 138 | 23 | 4 | 11 | 66 | 60 | 73 | .235 | 1 |
| Bill Heath, PH | 1 | 1 | 0 | 0 | 0 | 0 | 0 | 0 | 0 | 0 | .000 | 0 |
| Jim Hicks, RF, LF | 13 | 19 | 2 | 5 | 1 | 0 | 1 | 2 | 0 | 9 | .263 | 0 |
| Duane Josephson, C | 4 | 9 | 2 | 1 | 0 | 0 | 0 | 0 | 2 | 4 | .111 | 0 |
| Dick Kenworthy, PH | 3 | 1 | 0 | 0 | 0 | 0 | 0 | 0 | 1 | 0 | .000 | 0 |
| J. C. Martin, C, 1B | 119 | 230 | 21 | 60 | 12 | 0 | 2 | 21 | 24 | 29 | .261 | 2 |
| Tommy McCraw, 1B, OF | 133 | 273 | 38 | 65 | 12 | 1 | 5 | 21 | 25 | 48 | .238 | 12 |
| Dave Nicholson, OF | 54 | 85 | 11 | 13 | 2 | 1 | 2 | 12 | 9 | 40 | .153 | 0 |
| Floyd Robinson, RF, LF | 156 | 577 | 70 | 153 | 15 | 6 | 14 | 66 | 76 | 51 | .265 | 4 |
| Johnny Romano, C, LF | 122 | 356 | 39 | 86 | 11 | 0 | 18 | 48 | 59 | 74 | .242 | 0 |
| Jimmie Schaffer, C | 17 | 31 | 2 | 6 | 3 | 1 | 0 | 1 | 3 | 4 | .194 | 0 |
| Bill Skowron, 1B | 146 | 559 | 63 | 153 | 24 | 3 | 18 | 78 | 32 | 77 | .274 | 1 |
| Marv Staehle, PH | 7 | 7 | 0 | 3 | 0 | 0 | 0 | 2 | 0 | 0 | .429 | 0 |
| Bill Voss, RF | 11 | 33 | 4 | 6 | 0 | 1 | 1 | 3 | 3 | 5 | .182 | 0 |
| Pete Ward, 3B | 138 | 507 | 62 | 125 | 25 | 3 | 10 | 57 | 56 | 83 | .247 | 2 |
| Al Weis, 2B, SS, CF | 103 | 135 | 29 | 40 | 4 | 3 | 1 | 12 | 12 | 22 | .296 | 4 |

| Player | G | AB | R | H | 2B | 3B | HR | RBI | BB | SO | AVG | SB |
|---|---|---|---|---|---|---|---|---|---|---|---|---|
| John Buzhardt, P | 34 | 56 | 2 | 7 | 0 | 0 | 0 | 3 | 5 | 23 | .125 | 0 |
| Eddie Fisher, P | 82 | 29 | 3 | 4 | 1 | 0 | 0 | 1 | 1 | 12 | .138 | 0 |
| Joe Horlen, P | 34 | 68 | 0 | 9 | 1 | 0 | 0 | 2 | 5 | 12 | .132 | 0 |
| Bruce Howard, P | 30 | 41 | 1 | 6 | 2 | 1 | 0 | 3 | 4 | 18 | .146 | 0 |
| Tommy John, P | 39 | 59 | 4 | 10 | 1 | 0 | 1 | 2 | 3 | 22 | .169 | 0 |
| Frank Lary, P | 14 | 2 | 0 | 1 | 0 | 0 | 0 | 2 | 0 | 0 | .500 | 0 |
| Bob Locker, P | 51 | 14 | 0 | 0 | 0 | 0 | 0 | 0 | 0 | 13 | .000 | 0 |
| Gary Peters, P | 42 | 72 | 2 | 13 | 1 | 0 | 1 | 6 | 2 | 15 | .181 | 0 |
| Juan Pizarro, P | 19 | 34 | 5 | 8 | 0 | 0 | 1 | 4 | 2 | 10 | .235 | 0 |
| Hoyt Wilhelm, P | 66 | 22 | 1 | 0 | 0 | 0 | 0 | 0 | 2 | 12 | .000 | 0 |
| Ted Wills, P | 15 | 2 | 1 | 0 | 0 | 0 | 0 | 0 | 1 | 1 | .000 | 0 |
| Team totals | 162 | 5509 | 647 | 1354 | 200 | 38 | 125 | 587 | 533 | 916 | .246 | 50 |

=== Pitching ===
Note: W = Wins; L = Losses; ERA = Earned run average; G = Games pitched; GS = Games started; SV = Saves; IP = Innings pitched; H = Hits allowed; R = Runs allowed; ER = Earned runs allowed; HR = Home runs allowed; BB = Walks allowed; K = Strikeouts

| Player | W | L | ERA | G | GS | SV | IP | H | R | ER | HR | BB | K |
|---|---|---|---|---|---|---|---|---|---|---|---|---|---|
| Greg Bollo | 0 | 0 | 3.57 | 15 | 0 | 0 | 22.2 | 12 | 11 | 9 | 5 | 10 | 16 |
| John Buzhardt | 13 | 8 | 3.01 | 32 | 30 | 1 | 188.2 | 167 | 69 | 63 | 12 | 65 | 108 |
| Eddie Fisher | 15 | 7 | 2.40 | 82 | 0 | 24 | 165.1 | 118 | 51 | 44 | 13 | 51 | 90 |
| Joe Horlen | 13 | 13 | 2.88 | 34 | 34 | 0 | 219.0 | 203 | 88 | 70 | 16 | 48 | 125 |
| Bruce Howard | 9 | 8 | 3.47 | 30 | 22 | 0 | 148.0 | 123 | 61 | 57 | 13 | 77 | 120 |
| Tommy John | 14 | 7 | 3.09 | 39 | 27 | 3 | 183.2 | 162 | 67 | 63 | 12 | 64 | 126 |
| Frank Lary | 1 | 0 | 4.05 | 14 | 1 | 2 | 26.2 | 23 | 12 | 12 | 4 | 9 | 14 |
| Bob Locker | 5 | 2 | 3.15 | 51 | 0 | 2 | 91.1 | 71 | 36 | 32 | 6 | 40 | 69 |
| Gary Peters | 10 | 12 | 3.62 | 33 | 30 | 0 | 176.1 | 181 | 76 | 71 | 19 | 71 | 95 |
| Juan Pizarro | 6 | 3 | 3.43 | 18 | 18 | 0 | 97.0 | 96 | 42 | 37 | 9 | 40 | 65 |
| Hoyt Wilhelm | 7 | 7 | 1.81 | 66 | 0 | 20 | 144.0 | 88 | 34 | 29 | 11 | 39 | 106 |
| Ted Wills | 2 | 0 | 2.84 | 15 | 0 | 1 | 19.0 | 17 | 8 | 6 | 2 | 16 | 12 |
| Team totals | 95 | 67 | 2.99 | 162 | 162 | 53 | 1481.2 | 1261 | 555 | 493 | 122 | 530 | 946 |

== Farm system ==
| Level | Team | League | Manager |
|---|---|---|---|
| AAA | Indianapolis Indians | Pacific Coast League | George Noga |
| AA | Lynchburg White Sox | Southern League | Gordon Maltzberger |
| A | Tidewater Tides | Carolina League | Allen Jones |
| A | Sarasota Sun Sox | Florida State League | Don Bacon |
| A | Clinton C-Sox | Midwest League | Ira Hutchinson |
| Rookie | FRL White Sox | Florida Rookie League | Frank Parenti |

League Champions: Tidewater
