= 1968 Chicago White Sox season =

1968 Chicago White Sox
- League: American League
- Ballpark: White Sox Park
- City: Chicago
- Record: 67–95 (.414)
- League place: T–8th
- Owners: Arthur Allyn, Jr., John Allyn
- General managers: Ed Short
- Managers: Eddie Stanky, Les Moss, Al López
- Television: WFLD (Jack Drees, Dave Martin)
- Radio: WMAQ (AM) (Bob Elson, Red Rush)

The 1968 Chicago White Sox season was the team's 68th season in the major leagues, and its 69th season overall. They finished with a record of 67–95, good enough for eighth place in the American League, 36 games behind the first-place Detroit Tigers.

== Offseason ==
- October 16, 1967: Smoky Burgess was released by the White Sox.
- October 26, 1967: Marv Staehle was sent by the White Sox to the Cleveland Indians to complete an earlier deal (the White Sox traded Jim King and a player to be named later to the Indians for Rocky Colavito) made on July 29, 1967.
- November 29, 1967: Don Buford, Roger Nelson and Bruce Howard were traded by the White Sox to the Baltimore Orioles for Luis Aparicio, Russ Snyder and John Matias.
- December 15, 1967: Tommie Agee and Al Weis were traded by the White Sox to the New York Mets for Tommy Davis, Jack Fisher, Billy Wynne, and Buddy Booker.
- February 13, 1968: Dennis Higgins, Steve Jones, and Ron Hansen were traded by the White Sox to the Washington Senators for Tim Cullen, Buster Narum and Bob Priddy.

== Regular season ==
The White Sox played in 74 games that were decided by a one run margin, which is an all-time American League record. In those games, the team had a record of 30–44. The 44 one run losses are an all-time MLB record.

=== Season standings ===
American League
Team	W	L	Pct.	GB	Home	Road
Detroit Tigers	103	59	.636	—	56‍–‍25	47‍–‍34
Baltimore Orioles	91	71	.562	12	47‍–‍33	44‍–‍38
Cleveland Indians	86	75	.534	16½	43‍–‍37	43‍–‍38
Boston Red Sox	86	76	.531	17	46‍–‍35	40‍–‍41
New York Yankees	83	79	.512	20	39‍–‍42	44‍–‍37
Oakland Athletics	82	80	.506	21	44‍–‍38	38‍–‍42
Minnesota Twins	79	83	.488	24	41‍–‍40	38‍–‍43
California Angels	67	95	.414	36	32‍–‍49	35‍–‍46
Chicago White Sox	67	95	.414	36	36‍–‍45	31‍–‍50
Washington Senators	65	96	.404	37½	34‍–‍47	31‍–‍49

=== Record vs. opponents ===
1968 American League record Sources:
Team	BAL	BOS	CAL	CWS	CLE	DET	MIN	NYY	OAK	WAS
Baltimore	—	9–9	10–8	11–7	7–11	8–10	10–8	13–5	9–9	14–4
Boston	9–9	—	9–9	14–4	10–8	6–12	9–9	10–8	8–10	11–7
California	8–10	9–9	—	8–10	7–11	5–13	7–11	6–12	5–13	12–6
Chicago	7–11	4–14	10–8	—	5–13	5–13	10–8	6–12	10–8	10–8
Cleveland	11–7	8–10	11–7	13–5	—	6–12	14–4	10–8–1	6–12	7–10
Detroit	10–8	12–6	13–5	13–5	12–6	—	10–8	10–8–1	13–5–1	10–8
Minnesota	8–10	9–9	11–7	8–10	4–14	8–10	—	12–6	8–10	11–7
New York	5–13	8–10	12–6	12–6	8–10–1	8–10–1	6–12	—	10–8	14–4
Oakland	9–9	10–8	13–5	8–10	12–6	5–13–1	10–8	8–10	—	7–11
Washington	4–14	7–11	6–12	8–10	10–7	8–10	7–11	4–14	11–7	—

=== Opening Day lineup ===
- Luis Aparicio, SS
- Tommy McCraw, 1B
- Tommy Davis, LF
- Pete Ward, RF
- Ken Boyer, 3B
- Duane Josephson, C
- Ken Berry, CF
- Tim Cullen, 2B
- Joel Horlen, P

=== Notable transactions ===
- June 7, 1968: Rich McKinney was drafted by the White Sox in the 1st round (14th pick) of the 1968 Major League Baseball draft.
- July 20, 1968: Wayne Causey was traded by the White Sox to the California Angels for Woodie Held.
- July 26, 1968: Don McMahon was traded by the White Sox to the Detroit Tigers for Dennis Ribant.
- August 2, 1968: Tim Cullen was traded by the White Sox to the Washington Senators for Ron Hansen.

=== Roster ===
1968 Chicago White Sox
Roster
Pitchers: 30 Cisco Carlos; 22 Jack Fisher; 20 Joe Horlen; 25 Tommy John; 40 Danny Lazar; 23 Bob Locker; 44 Don McMahon; 49 Jerry Nyman; 43 Gary Peters; 39 Bob Priddy; 45 Fred Rath Sr.; 19 Dennis Ribant; 31 Hoyt Wilhelm; 28 Wilbur Wood; 46 Billy Wynne	Catchers: 6 Buddy Booker; 5 Duane Josephson; 15 Jerry McNertney; Infielders: 1 Sandy Alomar Sr.; 11 Luis Aparicio; 14 Ken Boyer; 9 Wayne Causey; 4 Tim Cullen; 4 Ron Hansen; 18 Gail Hopkins; 2 Dick Kenworthy; 24 Tommy McCraw; 14 Bill Melton; 52 Rich Morales; 8 Pete Ward	Outfielders: 16 Ken Berry; 32 Buddy Bradford; 10 Tommy Davis; 9 Woodie Held; 29 Carlos May; 7 Russ Snyder; 17 Bill Voss; 7 Leon Wagner; 3 Walt Williams	Manager: 42 Al López; 33 Les Moss; 12 Eddie Stanky; Coaches: 37 Ray Berres; 34 Kerby Farrell; 35 Marv Grissom; 35 Don Gutteridge; 33 Les Moss; 37 Grover Resinger

== Player stats ==
=== Batting ===
Note: G = Games played; AB = At bats; R = Runs scored; H = Hits; 2B = Doubles; 3B = Triples; HR = Home runs; RBI = Runs batted in; BB = Base on balls; SO = Strikeouts; AVG = Batting average; SB = Stolen bases

Player	G	AB	R	H	2B	3B	HR	RBI	BB	SO	AVG	SB
Sandy Alomar Sr., 2B, 3B, SS	133	363	41	92	8	2	0	12	20	42	.253	21
Luis Aparicio, SS	155	622	55	164	24	4	4	36	33	43	.264	17
Ken Berry, CF	153	504	49	127	21	2	7	32	25	64	.252	6
Buddy Booker, C	5	5	0	0	0	0	0	0	1	2	.000	0
Ken Boyer, 3B, 1B	10	24	0	3	0	0	0	0	1	6	.125	0
Buddy Bradford, RF, CF, LF	103	281	32	61	11	0	5	24	23	67	.217	8
Wayne Causey, 2B	59	100	8	18	2	0	0	7	14	7	.180	0
Tim Cullen, 2B	72	155	16	31	7	0	2	13	15	23	.200	0
Tommy Davis, LF, 1B	132	456	30	122	5	3	8	50	16	48	.268	4
Ron Hansen, 3B, SS	40	87	7	20	3	0	1	4	11	12	.230	0
Woodie Held, OF, 3B	40	54	5	9	1	0	0	2	5	14	.167	0
Gail Hopkins, 1B	29	37	4	8	2	0	0	2	6	3	.216	0
Duane Josephson, C	128	434	35	107	16	6	6	45	18	52	.247	2
Dick Kenworthy, 3B	58	122	2	27	2	0	0	2	5	21	.221	0
Carlos May, LF, RF	17	67	4	12	1	0	0	1	3	15	.179	0
Jerry McNertney, C	74	169	18	37	4	1	3	18	18	29	.219	0
Bill Melton, 3B	34	109	5	29	8	0	2	16	10	32	.266	1
Tommy McCraw, 1B	136	477	51	112	16	12	9	44	36	58	.235	20
Rich Morales, SS, 2B	10	29	2	5	0	0	0	0	2	5	.172	0
Russ Snyder, OF	38	82	2	11	2	0	1	5	4	16	.134	0
Bill Voss, OF	61	167	14	26	2	1	2	15	16	34	.156	5
Leon Wagner, RF, LF	69	162	14	46	8	0	1	18	21	31	.284	2
Pete Ward, 3B, 1B, LF, RF	125	399	43	86	15	0	15	50	76	85	.216	4
Walt Williams, RF, LF	63	133	6	32	6	0	1	8	4	17	.241	0

Player	G	AB	R	H	2B	3B	HR	RBI	BB	SO	AVG	SB
Cisco Carlos, P	29	31	0	2	0	0	0	0	1	15	.065	0
Jack Fisher, P	35	53	1	6	1	0	0	2	1	4	.113	0
Joe Horlen, P	41	67	2	7	0	1	0	3	3	13	.104	0
Tommy John, P	25	62	3	12	1	0	1	9	0	15	.194	0
Danny Lazar, P	8	2	0	0	0	0	0	1	1	1	.000	0
Bob Locker, P	70	8	0	0	0	0	0	0	0	5	.000	0
Don McMahon, P	25	3	0	1	0	0	0	0	0	1	.333	0
Jerry Nyman, P	8	13	1	2	0	0	0	0	0	8	.154	0
Gary Peters, P	46	72	10	15	3	1	2	8	6	13	.208	0
Bob Priddy, P	42	24	3	1	0	0	1	2	0	9	.042	0
Dennis Ribant, P	17	7	0	0	0	0	0	0	0	0	.000	0
Hoyt Wilhelm, P	72	3	0	0	0	0	0	0	0	3	.000	0
Wilbur Wood, P	88	22	0	2	0	0	0	2	2	17	.091	0
Team totals	162	5405	463	1233	169	33	71	431	397	840	.228	90

=== Pitching ===
Note: W = Wins; L = Losses; ERA = Earned run average; G = Games pitched; GS = Games started; SV = Saves; IP = Innings pitched; H = Hits allowed; R = Runs allowed; ER = Earned runs allowed; HR = Home runs allowed; BB = Walks allowed; K = Strikeouts

Player	W	L	ERA	G	GS	SV	IP	H	R	ER	HR	BB	K
Cisco Carlos	4	14	3.90	29	21	0	122.1	121	64	53	13	42	57
Jack Fisher	8	13	2.99	35	28	0	180.2	176	68	60	14	52	80
Joe Horlen	12	14	2.37	35	35	0	223.2	197	75	59	16	77	102
Tommy John	10	5	1.98	25	25	0	177.1	135	45	39	10	53	117
Danny Lazar	0	1	4.05	8	1	0	13.1	14	6	6	1	4	11
Bob Locker	5	4	2.29	70	0	10	90.1	78	27	23	4	40	62
Don McMahon	2	1	1.96	25	0	0	46.0	31	10	10	2	26	32
Jerry Nyman	2	1	2.01	8	7	0	40.1	38	13	9	1	17	27
Gary Peters	4	13	3.76	31	25	1	162.2	146	79	68	7	66	110
Bob Priddy	3	11	3.63	35	18	0	114.0	106	50	46	14	42	66
Fred Rath Sr.	0	0	1.59	5	0	0	11.1	8	5	2	0	4	3
Dennis Ribant	0	2	6.03	17	0	1	31.1	42	24	21	3	21	20
Hoyt Wilhelm	4	4	1.73	72	0	12	93.2	69	20	18	4	29	72
Wilbur Wood	13	12	1.87	88	2	16	159.0	127	39	33	8	45	74
Billy Wynne	0	0	4.50	1	0	0	2.0	2	2	1	0	2	1
Team totals	67	95	2.75	162	162	40	1468.0	1290	527	448	97	520	834

== Farm system ==
Level	Team	League	Manager
AAA	Hawaii Islanders	Pacific Coast League	Bill Adair
AA	Evansville White Sox	Southern League	Stan Wasiak and Gary Johnson
A	Lynchburg White Sox	Carolina League	Alex Cosmidis
A	Appleton Foxes	Midwest League	Gary Johnson and Stan Wasiak
A-Short Season	Duluth–Superior Dukes	Northern League	Bruce Andrew
Rookie	GCL White Sox	Gulf Coast League	Tom Saffell
