= Ed Short =

- Born: July 27, 1919; Chicago, Illinois, U.S.
- Died: July 16, 1984 (aged 64); Skokie, Illinois, U.S.
- Occupation: American professional sports executive
- Years active: 1950–1973

Edwin Gerald Short (July 27, 1919 – July 16, 1984) was an American professional baseball front office executive. Short worked for the Chicago White Sox of Major League Baseball for over 20 years, including nine seasons as the team's general manager, from August 26, 1961, until September 2, 1970. The White Sox were frequent contenders for the American League pennant during the first six seasons of his administration, but the last three years of Short's tenure saw the team lose 95, 98 and 106 games and play some of its home games in Milwaukee, Wisconsin, because of falling attendance at Comiskey Park.

== Early career and wartime service ==
After graduating from Roosevelt High School in Chicago in 1937, Short attended Wright Junior College. He worked for the Chicago Tribune and was a publicity man for Chicago Stadium in 1940–41. He then served in the United States Army during World War II, attaining the rank of captain, and was a radio broadcaster after the war, including a stint as sports director of WJJD-AM, Chicago. He joined the White Sox in 1950 as publicity director, and later was named the club's traveling secretary. Despite his having worked in administrative positions, rather than in baseball operations, he was promoted to succeed Hank Greenberg as the Chisox' general manager late in the 1961 season. But, as a GM, Short was noted for his bold moves.

== Rebuilding the White Sox ==
In his first off-season, he traded aging White Sox stars Billy Pierce, future Baseball Hall of Famer Minnie Miñoso and Roy Sievers to the National League for younger players. After the 1962 campaign, Short swung one of the biggest deals of the off-season, sending Hall of Fame shortstop Luis Aparicio and outfielder Al Smith to the Baltimore Orioles for Aparicio's Baltimore counterpart, Ron Hansen, young third baseman Pete Ward, power-hitting outfielder Dave Nicholson and future Hall of Fame knuckleball pitcher Hoyt Wilhelm. Hansen, Ward and Nicholson became regulars in 1963. Wilhelm would be Chicago's bullpen ace for six seasons (1963–68) and compile an earned run average of 1.92 in 361 games and 675 2/3 innings pitched in a White Sox uniform. That winter, Short also released Cooperstown-bound veteran pitcher Early Wynn, then stalled at 299 career victories. Short also would trade another White Sox legend and future Hall of Famer, Nellie Fox, and release nine-time AL All-Star and 3x Gold Glove Award catcher Sherm Lollar after the 1963 campaign.

However, Short believed that the best trade he ever made happened in January 1965, a three-way deal also involving the Kansas City Athletics and Cleveland Indians. In that transaction, the White Sox acquired ace left-handed starting pitcher Tommy John and centerfielder Tommie Agee.

The White Sox were serious pennant contenders in 1963, 1964, 1965 and 1967. They finished second in the ten-team American League from 1963 through 1965, and were edged out by the New York Yankees for the 1964 AL pennant by a single game.

== Swift decline after 1967 pennant race ==
The White Sox of the mid-1960s relied on pitching, speed and defense. In addition to Wilhelm, and, later, John, the team's pitchers also included starters Gary Peters, Juan Pizarro and Joel Horlen. Short also obtained left-handed knuckleball ace Wilbur Wood, who starred first in the bullpen and then, as a starting pitcher, won 20 games four times during his 12-season (1967–78) White Sox career.

But after competing for the 1967 pennant into the last week of the season, the 1968 White Sox started poorly and signaled the beginning of three years of desperate struggle at the gate and on the field. In 1968 and 1969, the White Sox played one game against every other AL opponent at Milwaukee County Stadium, which was wooing an expansion or relocated MLB team —such as the White Sox — at the time. At Comiskey, the Chisox drew an average of only 7,493 (1968), 6,633 (1969) and 6,115 (1970) fans per game. After an ownership transition from Arthur Allyn, Jr. to his younger brother John, and with the team's record at 49–87 and en route to a franchise-worst 56–106 finish, Short was dismissed and replaced by Stu Holcomb on September 1, 1970.

In his final job in professional sports, Short served as general manager of the Chicago Cougars of the World Hockey Association.

He died in Skokie, Illinois, aged 64, on July 16, 1984.

Short developed a reputation for being humorless and impersonal. Chicago sportswriter David Condon, supposedly quoting a friend, commented "An empty cab pulled up, and out stepped Ed Short."[Chicago Tribune, September 27, 1969, sec.2, p.1]

Preceded by Hank Greenberg	Chicago White Sox General manager 1961–1970	Succeeded by Stuart Holcomb
