= Klages =

Klages is a surname. Notable people with the surname include:

- Ellen Klages (born 1954), American fiction author
- Fred Klages (1943–2023), American former professional baseball player
- Ludwig Klages (1872–1956), German philosopher

== See also ==
- The Second Awakening of Christa Klages, 1978 film
- Klages's antwren (Myrmotherula klagesi), species of bird
