= J. C. Martin (baseball) =

American baseball player (born 1936)

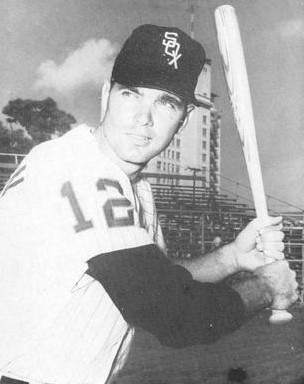
- Catcher
- Born: December 13, 1936 (age 89); Axton, Virginia, U.S.
- Batted: Left Threw: Right

MLB debut
- September 10, 1959, for the Chicago White Sox

Last MLB appearance
- August 12, 1972, for the Chicago Cubs

MLB statistics
- Batting average: .222
- Home runs: 32
- Runs batted in: 230
- Stats at Baseball Reference

Teams
- Chicago White Sox (1959–1967); New York Mets (1968–1969); Chicago Cubs (1970–1972)

Career highlights and awards
- World Series champion (1969)

For the former long-term mayor of Laredo, Texas, see J. C. Martin (Texas politician).

Joseph Clifton Martin (born December 13, 1936) is an American former professional baseball player. He played in Major League Baseball as a catcher from 1959 to 1972. Martin played the bulk of his career with the Chicago White Sox, but is most prominent for his involvement in a controversial play that occurred during the 1969 World Series as a member of the New York Mets. He ended his career playing for the Chicago Cubs. After his playing career, he worked as a White Sox color commentator alongside Harry Caray on WSNS television in 1975.

== Early career ==
Martin was born in Axton, Virginia and attended Ridgeway High School where he was a member of the baseball, football, basketball, and track and field teams. He signed a contract with the Chicago White Sox as a first baseman before the 1956 season and was assigned to play for the Holdrege White Sox of the Nebraska State League.

== Chicago White Sox ==
Martin made his major league debut on September 10, 1959 at the age of 22 as the White Sox were in the process of winning their first American League pennant since 1919. However, he was called up to the major leagues too late in the season to be eligible to play in the 1959 World Series, which the White Sox lost to the Los Angeles Dodgers in six games.

The White Sox returned Martin to the minor leagues in 1960 where he played for the San Diego Padres of the Pacific Coast League until he was recalled to White Sox in September as the season neared its end. In 1961, Martin split his playing time between first and third base, while batting .230 with five home runs and 32 runs batted in. In October, he was named to the 1961 Topps All-Star Rookie Team.

Martin converted into a catcher in 1962, after Al López convinced him to return to the minor leagues where he learned to catch under the tutelage of former major league catcher Les Moss. Regular catcher Sherm Lollar was at the tail end of his career at the age of 37; moreover, the White Sox had traded Earl Battey and Johnny Romano and had no catchers in their farm system. As the team’s regular catcher, Martin batted only .205 in 1963 and .197 in 1964.

In 1965, Martin batted a career-best .261, however, he also set a major league record with 33 passed balls (after committing 24 the year before)—due, in large part, to catching knuckleball pitchers Hoyt Wilhelm and Eddie Fisher. This record stood until Geno Petralli broke it in 1987.

The 1967 season was memorable for the tight, four-way pennant race between the White Sox, the Boston Red Sox, the Detroit Tigers, and the Minnesota Twins, with all four teams still in contention entering the final week of the season. Martin was the White Sox catcher on September 10, 1967 when Joe Horlen pitched a no-hitter over the Detroit Tigers at Comiskey Park. He helped guide the White Sox pitching staff to a 2.45 team earned run average (ERA), the lowest in the live-ball era (1920 onwards). Despite the impressive performance by the White Sox pitching staff, the team only had a .225 team batting average and were shutout in three straight games, as part of a five-game losing streak to end the season three games behind the Boston Red Sox.

After the season, the White Sox traded Martin to the New York Mets to complete a deal that had been made earlier in the season for Ken Boyer. In another deal that same offseason, the White Sox traded Tommie Agee and Al Weis to the Mets with four players (among them Tommy Davis and Jack Fisher) going to the White Sox.

== New York Mets ==
In 1969 Martin, as one of two backup catchers to Jerry Grote, (the other being Duffy Dyer), played on a Mets team which shockingly won the National League East title (both leagues now had two divisions after expanding from 10 teams to 12) after trailing the Chicago Cubs by as many as 10 games in August. In Game One of the first-ever NLCS, which the Mets swept over the Atlanta Braves, Martin, pinch-hitting for Tom Seaver, drove in Weis and Ed Kranepool with a base-hit off Phil Niekro during a five-run eighth inning, the Mets winning the game 9–5. The Mets went on to win the World Series in equally surprising fashion, in five games over the heavily favored Baltimore Orioles.

In Game Four of that Series, with his Mets leading two games to one, Martin was involved in a most controversial play. With the game tied 1–1 in the bottom of the 10th and pinch-runner Rod Gaspar on second, Martin, again pinch-hitting for Seaver, bunted to the mound and, while running to first, was hit on the arm by Pete Richert’s errant throw, the error allowing Gaspar to score the winning run. The Orioles protested, claiming Martin was running too far inside the baseline, however the umpires disagreed. Replays later showed Martin had been running inside the baseline, which could have resulted in him being called out for interference. The umpires said they did not make the call, however, because they felt Martin did not intentionally interfere with the play. As a result of this play, the running lane which extends from halfway down the first-base line to the bag was added to all major league fields, where a runner can be running in this lane and be hit by a thrown ball and not be called out for interference.

== Chicago Cubs ==
Martin was traded to the Chicago Cubs on March 29, 1970, for catcher Randy Bobb. He played in his final major league game on August 12, 1972 at the age of 35. After being released by the Cubs during spring training of 1973, Martin served on their coaching staff in 1974. He was also a White Sox broadcaster alongside Harry Caray on WSNS television in 1975.

== Career statistics ==
In a fourteen-year major league career, Martin played in 908 games, accumulating 487 hits in 2,189 at bats for a .222 career batting average along with 32 home runs, 230 runs batted in and a .291 on-base percentage. Over his career, he committed only 45 errors in 3,447 chances for a career .987 fielding percentage.

Martin caught five Hall-of-Fame pitchers during his career; Early Wynn, Hoyt Wilhelm, Tom Seaver, Nolan Ryan, and Ferguson Jenkins.
