= Steve Jones (baseball) =

American baseball player (born 1941)

- Pitcher
- Born: April 22, 1941 (age 85); Huntington Park, California, U.S.
- Batted: Left Threw: Left

MLB debut
- August 15, 1967, for the Chicago White Sox

Last MLB appearance
- September 21, 1969, for the Kansas City Royals

MLB statistics
- Win–loss record: 5–7
- Earned run average: 4.44
- Strikeouts: 59
- Stats at Baseball Reference

Teams
- Chicago White Sox (1967); Washington Senators (1968); Kansas City Royals (1969)

Steven Howell Jones (born April 22, 1941) is an American former left-handed Major League Baseball pitcher who played from 1967 to 1969 for the Chicago White Sox, Washington Senators, and Kansas City Royals. He is the brother of fellow former major leaguer Gary Jones.

Prior to playing professional baseball, he attended Whittier College. In 1962, he was signed by the Minnesota Twins as an amateur free agent. On December 2, 1963, he was drafted by the White Sox in the minor league draft. He made his big league debut with the White Sox on August 15, 1967. He started the game, lasting only 4 1/3 innings and allowing eight hits, one walk and three earned runs including a home run to Rick Monday. He went 2–2 with a 4.21 ERA in 11 games (three starts) in his first season.

On February 13, 1968, he was traded with Ron Hansen and Dennis Higgins to the Senators for Tim Cullen, Buster Narum and Bob Priddy. He appeared in seven games for the Senators in 1968, going 1–2 with a 5.91 ERA. He was taken as the 10th pick in the 1968 MLB expansion draft by the Royals. He pitched only one season for them, going 2–3 with a 4.23 ERA in 20 games (four games started). On September 21, 1969, he appeared in his final big league game.

Overall, Jones went 5–7 with a 4.44 ERA in 38 games (seven started). In 81 innings, he allowed 74 hits, 43 walks and 59 strikeouts.
