= Danny Lazar =

American baseball player (born 1943)

- Pitcher
- Born: November 14, 1943 (age 82); East Chicago, Indiana, U.S.
- Batted: Left Threw: Left

MLB debut
- June 21, 1968, for the Chicago White Sox

Last MLB appearance
- October 2, 1969, for the Chicago White Sox

MLB statistics
- Win–loss record: 0–1
- Earned run average: 5.56
- Strikeouts: 20
- Stats at Baseball Reference

Teams
- Chicago White Sox (1968–69)

John Daniel Lazar (born November 14, 1943) is an American former Major League Baseball pitcher. He pitched in parts of two seasons, 1968 and 1969, for the Chicago White Sox. An alum of Indiana State University, Lazar was elected to the ISU Hall of Fame in 2008 and inducted in 2009.

Twice he was named an All-ICC pitcher for the Sycamores; he led them in strikeouts and wins from 1963 to 1965, he continues to hold the strikeouts record (single-game) at 16.

== Sources ==
- Career statistics from Baseball Reference · Baseball Reference (Minors) · Retrosheet · Baseball Almanac
