= Greg Bollo =

American baseball player (born 1943)

- Pitcher
- Born: November 16, 1943 (age 81); Detroit, Michigan
- Batted: Right Threw: Right

MLB debut
- May 9, 1965, for the Chicago White Sox

Last MLB appearance
- October 2, 1966, for the Chicago White Sox

MLB statistics
- Win–loss record: 0–1
- Earned run average: 3.34
- Strikeouts: 20
- Stats at Baseball Reference

Teams
- Chicago White Sox (1965–1966)

Greg Bollo (born November 16, 1943) is a retired right-handed relief pitcher who played for the Chicago White Sox between 1965 and 1966. Bollo was signed by the White Sox as a free agent in 1964. He played for the minor league Tidewater Tides and Clinton C-Sox in 1964 before being promoted to the White Sox in 1965. Bollo debuted for the White Sox on May 9, 1965, in a 1–6 loss to the Minnesota Twins and played for the team for the remainder of the season. Bollo began the 1966 season in the minor leagues, playing for the Lynchburg White Sox. He was promoted to the majors again in September and played in three games for the White Sox in the 1966 season. Bollo's final major league game was on October 2, 1966; the game, a 0–2 loss to the New York Yankees, was the only game Bollo started in his career as well as his only major-league decision, as he was credited with the loss. After 1966, Bollo played in the minor leagues for several seasons and made appearances for the Evansville White Sox, Hawaii Islanders, Columbus White Sox, and Tucson Toros.
