= Fred Klages =

American baseball player (1943–2023)

- Pitcher
- Born: October 31, 1943; Ambridge, Pennsylvania
- Died: March 30, 2023 (aged 79); Spring, Texas
- Batted: Right Threw: Right

MLB debut
- September 11, 1966, for the Chicago White Sox

Last MLB appearance
- September 11, 1967, for the Chicago White Sox

MLB statistics
- Win–loss record: 5–4
- Earned run average: 3.28
- Strikeouts: 23
- Innings: 60 1/3
- Stats at Baseball Reference

Teams
- Chicago White Sox (1966–1967)

Frederick Albert Antony Klages (October 31, 1943 – March 30, 2023) was an American professional baseball right-handed pitcher, who played in Major League Baseball (MLB) for the Chicago White Sox (1966–67), where he appeared in 14 games (12 as a starter). During his playing days, Klages stood 6 feet 2 inches (1.88 m), weighing 185 pounds (84 kg). He played in 14 games.

Klages died on March 30, 2023, at the age of 79.
