= George Noga =

George Stephen Noga (November 5, 1927 - February 5, 1998) was an American retired infielder, manager and scout in professional baseball. A native of New York, New York, Noga spent the latter portion of his playing days and all of his managing career in the farm system of the Chicago White Sox. He threw and batted right-handed, stood 5 ft 9 in (1.75 m) tall and weighed 175 lb (79 kg).

Noga's best season, 1954, was divided between the Colorado Springs Sky Sox of the Class A Western League and the Memphis Chicks of the Double-A Southern Association. He hit .278 with 12 home runs and 62 runs batted in. He managed for 12 years (1956–67) in the ChiSox organization, winning the 1964 Southern League championship as skipper of the Lynchburg White Sox.

After 1967, he scouted for the White Sox, Kansas City Royals and Los Angeles Dodgers, among other organizations.
