= Dick Kenworthy =

American baseball player (1941–2010)

- Third baseman
- Born: April 1, 1941; Red Oak, Iowa, U.S.
- Died: April 22, 2010 (aged 69); Kansas City, Missouri, U.S.
- Batted: Right Threw: Right

MLB debut
- September 8, 1962, for the Chicago White Sox

Last MLB appearance
- September 29, 1968, for the Chicago White Sox

MLB statistics
- Batting average: .215
- Home runs: 4
- Runs batted in: 15
- Stats at Baseball Reference

Teams
- Chicago White Sox (1962; 1964–1968)

Richard Lee Kenworthy (April 1, 1941 – April 22, 2010) was an American third baseman in Major League Baseball who played for the Chicago White Sox (1962, 1964–1968). Listed at 5' 9", 170 lb., Kenworthy batted and threw right-handed. He was born in Red Oak, Iowa, United States.

Kenworthy was signed by the White Sox in 1961 out of the University of Missouri. He was assigned immediately to Class-A Clinton C-Sox, where he hit 22 home runs, a season team-record since then. Although Kenworthy finally caught on in the majors, he had to endure five more failed tryouts with Chicago, serving as a backup for Don Buford and Pete Ward.

In a six-season career, Kenworthy was a .215 hitter (54-for-251) with four home runs and 13 RBI in 125 games, including 12 runs, six doubles and one triple.

Kenworthy died in Kansas City, Missouri at the age of 69.

== See also ==
- Chicago White Sox all-time roster
