= Tommy John =

American baseball player (1943–2026)

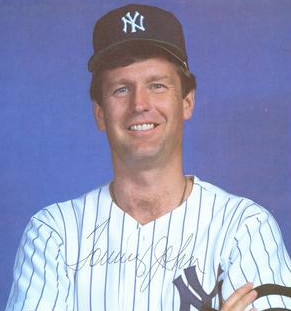
- John with the New York Yankees in 1981
- Pitcher
- Born: May 22, 1943; Terre Haute, Indiana, U.S.
- Died: August 15, 2026 (aged 83); Lakewood Ranch, Florida, U.S.
- Batted: Right Threw: Left

MLB debut
- September 6, 1963, for the Cleveland Indians

Last MLB appearance
- May 25, 1989, for the New York Yankees

MLB statistics
- Win–loss record: 288–231
- Earned run average: 3.34
- Strikeouts: 2,245
- Stats at Baseball Reference

Teams
- Cleveland Indians (1963–1964); Chicago White Sox (1965–1971); Los Angeles Dodgers (1972–1974, 1976–1978); New York Yankees (1979–1982); California Angels (1982–1985); Oakland Athletics (1985); New York Yankees (1986–1989)

Career highlights and awards
- 4× All-Star (1968, 1978–1980)

Thomas Edward John Jr. (May 22, 1943 – August 15, 2026), nicknamed "the Bionic Man", was an American professional baseball pitcher who played in Major League Baseball (MLB) for 26 seasons between 1963 and 1989. He played for the Cleveland Indians, Chicago White Sox, Los Angeles Dodgers, New York Yankees, California Angels, and Oakland Athletics. He was a four-time MLB All-Star and has the second-most wins (288) of any pitcher since 1900 not in the Hall of Fame. Known for his longevity, John was an Opening Day starter six times – three for the White Sox (1966, 1970, and 1971) and three times for the Yankees (1981, 1982, (Note: John's 1982 Opening Day start was not the Yankees' first game of the season, but the second game of a doubleheader.) and 1989).

At the age of 18, in 1961, John was signed by the Indians, who were impressed with his curveball. After three seasons in the minor leagues for them, he was called up for the first time in 1963. He pitched two seasons for Cleveland before getting traded to the White Sox, with whom he spent seven seasons. He established himself as a major league starter in 1965 and became Chicago's Opening Day starter in 1966. In 1968, he finished fifth in the American League (AL) with a 1.98 earned run average (ERA) and was named to his first All-Star team, though he missed the end of the season after he was injured in a fight with Dick McAuliffe. In 1971, pitching coach Johnny Sain tried to have John throw a slider more, but John had his highest ERA since 1964 and was traded to the Dodgers for Dick Allen after the season. He won 11 games in 1972 with the Dodgers, then led the National League (NL) in winning percentage over the next two seasons (.696 in 1973 and .813 in 1974). In 1974, though, he suffered a potentially career-ending injury when he tore his ulnar collateral ligament (UCL) in a game against the Montreal Expos. Frank Jobe, the Dodger physician, performed ligament replacement surgery on John later that year. He missed the 1975 season recovering from surgery, but he became the first pitcher to successfully return to baseball following such surgery. "Tommy John" surgery has since become a common procedure among baseball pitchers, with 35.3% of MLB pitchers who were active in 2023 having received it at some point during their careers.

John had a 10–10 record his first year back from recovery. In 1977, at age 34, John had his first career 20-win season, going 20–7 with a 2.78 ERA as the Dodgers won the NL West and reached the 1977 World Series. He helped the Dodgers return to the World Series in 1978 with a 17–10 record before leaving for the Yankees as a free agent. With the Yankees, John posted 20-win seasons in 1979 and 1980; he was an All-Star in those years as well as in 1978, his final year with the Dodgers. He appeared in three World Series contested between the Dodgers and Yankees, his only World Series appearances, and pitched for the losing team in all three albeit with a 2.67 ERA in 33.2 World Series innings pitched. He was traded to the California Angels in 1982, for whom he made two starts in the AL Championship Series. He remained with the team until 1985, when he was released, though he spent the second half of the season pitching for the Oakland Athletics. Unsigned to begin 1986, it appeared that John's career might be over, but injuries to Yankee pitchers prompted New York to re-sign him. John won 13 games for the Yankees in 1987, then, at age 45, became the oldest player in baseball in 1988 following Phil Niekro's retirement. In 1989, he tied Deacon McGuire's record for most seasons pitched (26, later broken by Nolan Ryan, who ended with 27) before retiring.

He served as a broadcaster for the Minnesota Twins and the Yankees in the 1990s, then managed the Bridgeport Bluefish from 2007 through the first half of the 2009 season. After retiring, he served as a motivational speaker and also founded the "Let's Do It" Foundation, dedicated to raising awareness about suicides and preventing them.

== Early life ==
John was born on May 22, 1943, in Terre Haute, Indiana, where he grew up. As a youth, he often played sandlot ball with other kids, either at Spencer F. Ball Park or Woodrow Wilson field. Arley Andrews, a former minor league pitcher and a friend of John's father, taught John to throw a curveball, which would be John's main pitch. John was an outstanding baseball and basketball player at Gerstmeyer High School in Terre Haute. He had a 28–2 record as a pitcher. Athletics did not get in the way of his schoolwork, as John graduated as Gerstmeyer's 1961 valedictorian. School faculty forbade John from delivering a valedictory address because of his stutter. Several colleges recruited John as a basketball player, including the University of Kentucky, but John also caught the eye of Cleveland Indians' scout Johnny Schulte, who worried that John needed more of a fastball to succeed but considered his curveball already a major league pitch. John picked baseball and signed with the Indians after graduating, getting assigned to the Dubuque Packers of the Class D Midwest League.

== Professional career ==
=== Minor leagues (1961–1963) ===
John had a 10–4 record in 1961 but had some trouble with the Charleston Indians of the Class A Eastern League in 1962. "I was rearing back on every pitch and firing with all my strength at the strike zone," he said. "As a result I kept getting behind in the ball-and-strike count, often running it to three balls and no strikes, so I just had to put my fastball right over the plate and get it creamed." This led to a lot of walks, but player-coach Steve Jankowski worked with him, suggesting that John throw less hard so that he would have more control. The alterations helped John get called up to the Class AAA Jacksonville Suns of the International League during the year, and John won two games for them with the playoffs. He started 1963 with Jacksonville, got sent down to Charleston, went 9–2 with a 1.61 ERA for the West Virginian Indians, and got called up to the major leagues in September at the age of twenty.

=== Cleveland Indians (1963–1964) ===
On September 6, 1963, John started what would become a 26-year major league career, allowing one unearned run in one inning of a 7–2 loss to the Washington Senators. Used at first as a reliever, he finished the year with three starts. Though his record was 0–2, his earned run average (ERA) was 2.21. Cleveland manager Birdie Tebbetts called his fastball "deceptive."

In his first start of 1964, on May 3, John threw a shutout against the Baltimore Orioles for his first major league win in the second game of a doubleheader. He won two of his first three games but then lost eight decisions in a row and got sent to AAA (now the Portland Beavers of the Pacific Coast League) in July. Indians' pitching coach Early Wynn had been trying to get John to throw a slider, but John altered his grip, affecting his control. He returned to throwing just a fastball and a curveball in the minors and was called up for a few games in September by the Indians. After the season, he was sent to the Chicago White Sox as part of a three-way trade between Cleveland, Chicago, and the Kansas City Athletics that sent Rocky Colavito to Cleveland.

=== Chicago White Sox (1965–1971) ===
1971 photo pack of John for Chicago White Sox

John's first appearances with the White Sox were in relief. During the first half of the 1965 season, he and Juan Pizarro alternatively spent time as Chicago's fifth starter in the rotation. By the second half, however, he had cemented himself within the team's starting rotation. On September 25, he held the New York Yankees to one run and hit a go-ahead home run against Bill Stafford to give himself a 3–1 victory. In 39 games (27 starts), he had a 14–7 record, a 3.09 ERA, 126 strikeouts, 58 walks, and 162 hits allowed in 183 2/3 innings.

In 1966, manager Eddie Stanky had made John his Opening Day starter. He tied for the American League (AL) lead with five shutouts during the season. Two of these, May 7 against the Detroit Tigers and August 12 against the California Angels, came on days when the White Sox only scored one run for him. In 34 games (33 starts), he had a 14–11 record, a 2.62 ERA, 138 strikeouts, 57 walks, and 195 hits in 223 innings. His 2.62 ERA placed fifth in the league, and his 10 complete games tied for ninth (with Mudcat Grant).

Once again in 1967, John led the AL in shutouts, this time with six. He had a season-high nine strikeouts in a shutout of the Senators on June 13. On July 4, he shut out the defending-World Series champion Orioles, limiting Baltimore to two hits. On July 22, he left a game against the Athletics after facing just two batters and did not pitch again until August 20. He was plagued in the season's second half by a severe gastrointestinal virus that caused him to lose 28 pounds. At season's end, his record was just 10–13, but his 2.47 ERA ranked fourth in the league. He had 110 strikeouts, 47 walks, and 143 hits allowed in 178 1/3 innings.

1968 started out as John's best season thus far in his career. On June 30, he shut out the Tigers in a 12–0 victory. With a 1.78 ERA in the first half, he was named to the All-Star Game for the first time during his major league tenure. Another highlight came against Cleveland August 9, when he held the Indians scoreless for seven innings and scored the only run of the game. He had a 1.98 ERA through 25 starts with the White Sox in 1968. On August 22, with a 3–2 count on Dick McAuliffe, John threw ball four over McAuliffe's head. An angry McAuliffe charged the mound and started a fight between the two players. McAuliffe was fined and suspended; John was not punished, but he tore some shoulder ligaments in the scuffle and missed the rest of the season with an injury. Thirty years later, McAuliffe said in an interview that he still thought John was trying to hit him in that game. White Sox' general manager (GM) Ed Short noted that this was unlikely given that the pitch before the fight came on a 3–2 count, resulting in a walk for McAuliffe. Though pitcher ERAs were down across baseball in 1968, John's still ranked fifth in the league. He had a 10–5 record and gave up just 135 hits in 177 1/3 innings.

John recovered in time for the 1969 season, though Gary Peters got the Opening Day start, with John second in the rotation. In his first start of the year, against the Athletics on April 9, John allowed only four hits in a complete game shutout, as Chicago won 3–0. He held the Indians scoreless for 7 2/3 innings on May 10, earning the victory as the White Sox prevailed by a score of 4–0. On June 20, in the first game of a doubleheader, he held the Angels to one run over 10 innings but received a no-decision in a 12-inning, 2–1 defeat. John was 6–11 on September 1, but he won his last three decisions to finish the season 9–11. In one of those wins, on September 19, he allowed eight hits but no runs in a 7–0 victory over the Kansas City Royals. In 33 starts, John had a 3.25 ERA, 128 strikeouts, 90 walks, and 230 hits allowed in 232 1/3 innings.

In 1970, John got the Opening Day start but struggled, giving up six runs (five earned) in 4 2/3 innings as the Twins beat the White Sox 12–0 on April 7. In fact, he lost his first five starts before defeating the Orioles on April 30. On June 12, he allowed only two hits in a complete game shutout over the Senators, as the White Sox won the game 6–0. He lost four starts in a row after that game, then won his next five decisions. On July 26, he allowed seven hits in a complete game shutout of the Tigers, which the White Sox won 4–0. In the first game of a doubleheader against the Yankees on August 23, he allowed only four hits in a complete game shutout that the White Sox won 2–0. John finished the year with a 12–17 record. His 17 losses tied teammate Gerry Janeski for third in the AL, and teammate Joe Horlen was fifth with 16. John also finished fourth in walks (101, behind Sam McDowell's 131, Mickey Lolich's 109, and Jim Rooker's 102), and he led the AL in wild pitches, throwing what would be a career-high 17. His ERA was 3.27, he struck out 138 hitters, and he had fewer hits allowed (253) than innings pitched (269 1/3). Despite his losing record, he was the only Chicago pitcher to start 10 or more games and post an ERA under 4.75.

Johnny Sain became the White Sox' pitching coach in 1971, and he was determined to get John to throw a slider more. This caused trouble for John, who had his highest ERA since 1964. Through his first 11 games, his ERA was 6.08, but he posted a 2.97 ERA in his last 27 games. In the first game of a doubleheader against the defending World Champion Orioles on May 31, he threw a shutout in a 1–0 victory. On June 17, he held the Twins to three runs over 10 innings. The White Sox pinch-hit for him in the 11th, took a 6–3 lead, then lost 7–6 after three relievers gave up four runs in the bottom of the inning. He struck out a season-high nine hitters on June 29 but also gave up four runs (two earned) in a 5–2 loss to the Milwaukee Brewers. In 38 games (35 starts), he had a 13–16 record, a 3.61 ERA, three shutouts, 131 strikeouts, 58 walks, and 244 hits in 229 1/3 innings pitched. His 16 losses tied him for seventh in the AL with Ray Culp and Dick Bosman.

=== Los Angeles Dodgers (1972–1978) ===
1972 photo of John for Los Angeles Dodgers

John was traded along with Steve Huntz from the White Sox to the Los Angeles Dodgers for Dick Allen at the Winter Meetings on December 2, 1971. He got along much better with Red Adams, the Dodger pitching coach, who encouraged John to use his soft fastball instead of trying to rely on his breaking pitches. "You'll get plenty of batters out with that," Adams said, praising the movement John put on his fastball. He gave up 13 hits and five runs on July 12 but completed the game as the Dodgers beat the Philadelphia Phillies by a score of 9–5. Six days later, he pitched nine innings and only allowed one unearned run but settled for a no-decision, as the Dodgers defeated the New York Mets 2–1 in the 10th inning. On August 3, he gave up only three hits in a complete game, 3–0 shutout victory over the San Francisco Giants. Though John made 29 starts for the Dodgers in 1972, his season ended prematurely on September 23, due to an injury suffered in a game against the Giants. John singled against Frank Reberger in the third, advanced to second on a walk, and attempted to score on a single by Bill Buckner. As he slid into home, though (where he was called out), he jammed his throwing elbow hard into the ground, dislodging bone chips. He pitched 1 2/3 more innings before getting taken out of the game, but took the remainder of the year off and had surgery to clear out the elbow. John had an 11–5 record, a 2.89 ERA, 117 strikeouts, 40 walks, and 172 hits allowed in 186 2/3 innings. His .688 winning percentage was fifth in the National League (NL).

In his first start of 1973 for the Dodgers, on April 8 against the San Diego Padres, John threw scoreless ball for 7 1/3 innings, earning the win in a 4–0 victory. On June 18, he allowed eight runs in only one inning as the Dodgers were defeated 16–3 by the Phillies, but only two were earned (the rest were due to a Ron Cey error). He held the Chicago Cubs to five hits on July 13 in a 5–0, complete game shutout victory. On August 24, he had a better start against the Phillies, limiting them to three hits in a 3–0, complete game shutout victory. That game was the first of six straight decisions John would win through the end of the season. With a 16–7 record at season's end, John tied with three others for seventh in the NL in wins and led the NL with a .696 winning percentage. He recorded 116 strikeouts, 50 walks, and 202 hits allowed in 218 innings of work.

John began 1974 as the Dodgers' number two starter, behind Don Sutton in the rotation. He threw a shutout against the Padres in his first start on April 6, then threw eight shutout innings against the Atlanta Braves four days later. On April 25, he held the Phillies to four hits and no runs in a complete game shutout that the Dodgers won 1–0. The win was his fifth in five games. After a loss on May 5, he again won five decisions in a row, not losing again until June 18. From June 28 through July 7, he won three straight starts.

==== 1974–1975: Tommy John surgery ====
In the middle of an excellent 1974 season, John had a 13–3 record as the Dodgers were en route to their first NL pennant in eight years. He led the NL in wins coming into the All-Star break but was left off the roster, as the Dodgers already had Andy Messersmith and Mike Marshall on the team. "If I don't belong on the team, there is no justice in baseball," John said on July 17. "It really sets you back. I've had a great year, I've worked hard and yet I can't even get picked for the All-Star team." Bigger disappointment followed for John in that evening's game against the Montreal Expos. With the Dodgers leading 4–0 in the third inning, John tried to throw a sinking fastball to Hal Breeden. Suddenly, he felt the "strangest sensation I had ever known...right at the point where I put force on the pitch, the point where my arm is back and bent, something happened," he explained. "It felt as if I had left my arm someplace else. It was as if my body continued to go forward and my left arm had just flown out to right field, independent of the rest of me." John had permanently damaged the ulnar collateral ligament in his pitching arm; he threw one more pitch before having manager Walt Alston remove him from the game. Initially, he was uncertain how serious the injury was; Frank Jobe, the Dodgers' team physician, advised John to rest the arm for a few days and treat it with ice. After a month, though, the injury had not improved. John attempted to pitch batting practice in New York, and when he failed to get much velocity on his pitches, he told Alston he was likely done for the season. In 22 starts for the Dodgers, he had a 13–3 record, a 2.59 ERA, 78 strikeouts, 42 walks, and 133 hits allowed in 153 innings. He also threw three shutouts and led the NL with a .813 winning percentage.

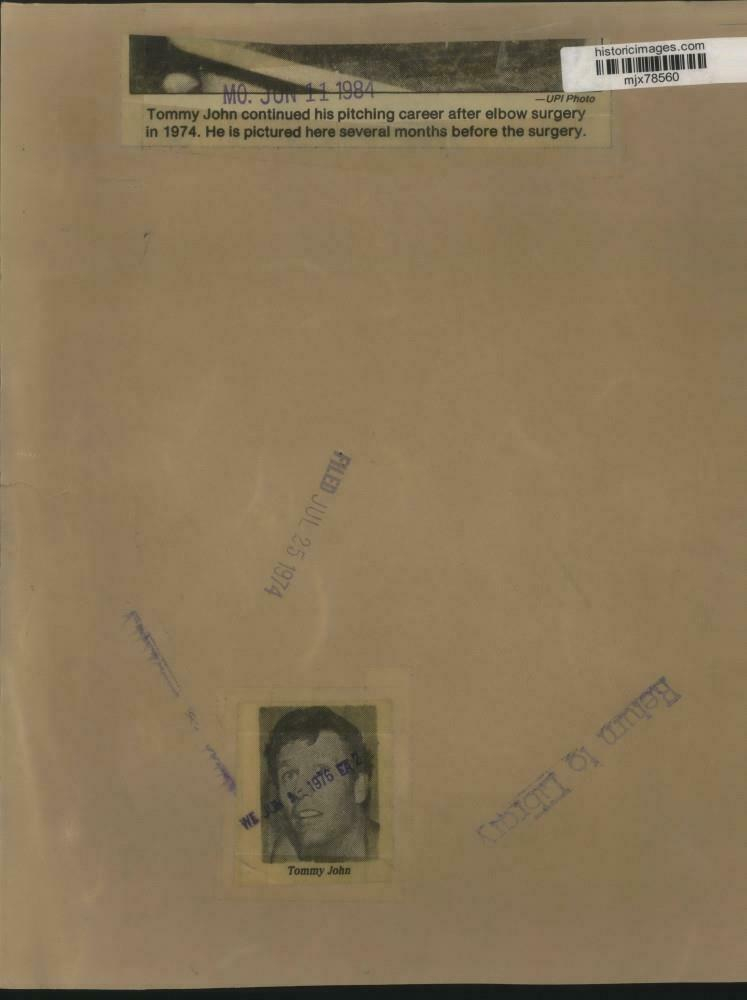
John in July 1974, two months before his elbow surgery

With his career in doubt, John decided to allow Jobe to attempt a revolutionary surgical operation, ulnar collateral ligament reconstruction. This operation, colloquially known as "Tommy John surgery", replaced the ligament in the elbow of John's pitching arm with a tendon from his right forearm. Though the procedure had actually been performed on other people before, it was usually conducted on wrists and hands; John was the first baseball pitcher to have it done on his elbow. The surgery was performed on September 25, 1974, and it took four hours; Jobe made holes in the humerus and ulna bones of John's left arm and used anchors to insert the tendon in what was roughly a figure-eight shape. It seemed unlikely John would ever be able to pitch again, as most pitchers in the past who had surgery on their arms never were effective again. Jobe gave the operation 100-1 odds of being successful, but John had it anyway, as his other option was to start working at a friend's car dealership in Terre Haute.

The recovery was long and slow. Initially, John's left hand was shriveled and he lacked feeling in several of his fingers, due to damage to the ulnar nerve; Jobe performed a second procedure to reroute the nerve that was necessary to John's full recovery. His arm was in a cast until January 1975, and once it was removed, John began performing exercises seven days a week to rebuild strength in the arm. He attended spring training with the Dodgers in 1975, by which point he had recovered the full range of motion of his arm but still lacked feeling in some of his fingers, preventing him from gripping the ball properly. For six weeks, he would tape the fingers that lacked feeling to ones that had it, then feebly throw balls against a wall for a while. John also worked with teammate and pitcher Mike Marshall, who had a master's degree in kinesiology and who was said to know how to help pitchers recover from injuries, on learning a different grip to use while pitching. In the midst of doubts about his ability to come back, John kept repeating Luke 1:37 to himself: "For with God, nothing shall be impossible."

Finally, in June, feeling came back to John's injured fingers. His velocity started to improve in July, and by September, he was healthy enough to pitch in an off-season instructional league in Arizona. Beginning September 29, John made five appearances with the team, throwing as many as seven innings by his final one.

==== 1976–1978: The comeback ====
John returned to the Dodgers in 1976, the fourth starter in their rotation after spending all of the previous year on the disabled list. On April 16, he made his comeback, against the Braves at Fulton County Stadium. "I was back in my office," John later described the day. "I took a year-and-a-half hiatus to, you know, go abroad and study and learn the dynamics of nuclear fission, or something like that. I did all that, and now I was back at work." Though he allowed three runs in five innings and took the loss, it was the first time any pitcher had started a game following UCL reconstruction surgery. Darrell Evans of the Braves called the return a "miracle." Soon, players and writers were referring to John as "The Bionic Man."

Five days after the Atlanta game, in a 1–0 loss to the Houston Astros, John threw seven scoreless innings. On June 13, he threw his first complete game since the injury, also against the Expos, whom he held to three runs in a 6–3 victory. He threw a four-hit shutout against the Padres on July 23 and a 10-hit shutout against the Cincinnati Reds on September 14. John made 31 starts for the Dodgers in 1976, posting a 10–10 record, a 3.09 ERA, 91 strikeouts, 61 walks, and 207 hits allowed in 207 innings pitched. In recognition of John's accomplishments, the Sporting News awarded him its NL Comeback Player of the Year Award, and John also won the Fred Hutchinson Award, presented annually to a player who shows outstanding character and courage. "I thank God every day for being able to pitch," John told The New York Times after his comeback. "If I win, thanks for letting me win, if I lose, thanks for letting me lose because that's better than being on the sidelines."

Dissatisfied with his contract entering spring training in 1977, John threatened to file for free agency after the season. However, he ultimately signed a two-year, $400,000 contract to stay with the Dodgers. Through June 12, he had a 6–4 record and a 4.08 ERA. Starting June 18, John won 10 consecutive decisions, not losing another ballgame until August 19 against the Cubs. He had a 1.32 ERA during the winning streak, and his ERA from June 18 to the end of the season was 2.19. He threw a complete game shutout against the Padres on July 16, allowing just four hits in a 1–0 victory. On August 8, he held the defending World Series champion Reds to two hits in a 4–0 complete game shutout victory. He threw a shutout in his next start too, allowing four hits in an 11–0 victory over Atlanta on August 13. John won 20 games for the first time in his career in 1977, his 14th season in Major League Baseball, finishing with a 20–7 record. He ranked among the NL leaders in wins (third, tied with Bob Forsch, Rick Reuschel, and John Candelaria) and ERA (2.78, fifth). John finished 12th in NL Most Valuable Player (MVP) voting and was second in voting for the NL Cy Young Award, bested by Steve Carlton, who led the NL with 23 wins.

With a 98–64 record, the Dodgers won the NL West. For John, who had been injured when the Dodgers won the division in 1974, it was his first chance to pitch in the playoffs. He started Game 1 of the NL Championship Series (NLCS) against the Phillies, but only lasted 4 2/3 innings. He gave up four unearned runs, the result of two errors by Bill Russell, the Dodger shortstop. That was the only Dodger loss of the series, though, and John won the last game of the series four days later, allowing seven hits but one run in rainy weather as the Dodgers beat the Phillies 4–1 in Game 4. In both of his NLCS starts, John gave up fewer runs than his opponent on the mound, Carlton. The Dodgers faced the New York Yankees in the World Series; John started Game 3 but gave up five runs (four earned) over six innings, including three in the first inning, as the Yankees won 5–3. Dodger manager Tommy Lasorda said John would start Game 7 if the series went that far, but the Yankees were victorious in six games, making Game 3 John's only appearance in the loss.

John won all four of his starts in April 1978, throwing complete games in the last three. On May 17, he held the Pittsburgh Pirates to four hits and one run, striking out seven in a complete game, 10–1 victory. In the second game of a doubleheader against the Houston Astros on July 8, he relieved Bob Welch in the sixth inning and threw four shutout innings, picking up the victory in Los Angeles's 7–5 triumph. With a 10–6 record and a 3.80 ERA halfway through the season, John was named to the NL All-Star team, his first selection to an All-Star Team in 10 years and the first of three in a row for him. In a complete game against Montreal on August 29, he held the Expos to one unearned run in a complete game, 4–1 victory. In 33 games (30 starts), he had a 17–10 record, a 3.30 ERA, 124 strikeouts, 53 walks, and 230 hits allowed in 213 innings. He finished eighth in Cy Young Award voting.

For the second year in a row, the Dodgers won the NL West and faced the Phillies in the NLCS. The Game 2 starter, John threw a four-hit shutout as the Dodgers won 4–0. After the Phillies won Game 3, the Dodgers won Game 4 to set up another playoff rematch, this time with the Yankees in the 1978 World Series. John started Game 1, giving up five runs (only three of which were earned) in 7 2/3 innings but earning the win in Los Angeles's 11–5 victory. In Game 4, he held the Yankees to two runs (one earned) through seven innings before getting removed in the eighth after giving up a leadoff single to Paul Blair. Blair went on to score, and John got a no-decision in a 10-inning, 4–3 loss. For the second year in a row, New York won the series in six games.

With his contract up at the end of the season, John became a free agent. On November 21, he signed a three-year, $1.4 million contract with the New York Yankees. Though the Royals and the Reds had both offered more money, John chose the Yankees because, as he said, "I like to play for a winner."

=== New York Yankees (1979–1982) ===
John won his first nine decisions as a Yankee, including shutout victories on April 12 and May 20, 1979. Through July 6, he was leading the AL in wins and had a 13–3 record, as he had five years earlier with the Dodgers, before the surgery. That day, he threw a complete game shutout in a 3–0 victory over the Athletics. He held the Indians to three hits on September 19, getting removed with two outs in the ninth after allowing a single to Toby Harrah but still earning the win as the Yankees defeated the Indians 2–0. John finished the year with a 21–9 record, 111 strikeouts (it was the last season he would have more than 100 strikeouts), 65 walks, and 268 hits allowed in 276 1/3 innings pitched. He was second to teammate Ron Guidry in ERA (2.96; Guidry's was 2.78), and he was second to Mike Flanagan in wins (Flanagan had 23). John finished 22nd in MVP voting and was the runner-up in Cy Young voting again, this time to Flanagan.

After taking a no-decision in his first start of the 1980 season, John won seven starts in a row, not losing until May 20. From June 30 through July 22, he won five starts in a row, and from August 29 through September 13, he won four starts in a row. John pitched particularly well against the White Sox, throwing shutouts all three times he faced them, including a two-hit performance on April 16 when he retired 13 hitters in a row at one point. On May 11, he held the Twins to six hits in a 5–0 shutout victory. He allowed just two hits on June 6 in a 3–0 shutout victory over the Seattle Mariners. On July 22, he held Milwaukee to four hits in the first game of a doubleheader, throwing a shutout as the Yankees defeated the Brewers 3–0. No other AL pitcher would win 20 games in back-to-back years again until Roger Clemens did so 1986 and 1987. In 36 starts, John won a career-high 22 games while losing nine, recording a 3.43 ERA, 78 strikeouts, 56 walks, and 270 hits allowed in 265 1/3 innings pitched. His six shutouts led the AL, the first time in 13 years he led a league in that category. He tied with Mike Norris for second in the AL in wins, behind Steve Stone's 25. John finished fourth in Cy Young Award voting. The Yankees won the AL East with a 103–59 record, and John started Game 3, with the Yankees facing elimination by the Royals after losing the first two games. With the Yankees leading 2–1 in the seventh, John retired the first two batters but was replaced by Goose Gossage after giving up a double to Willie Wilson; Gossage gave up a home run to George Brett a couple batters later, and the Yankees lost 4–2, though John was not credited with a decision.

"I'd like to pitch as long as I can effectively do the job," John told The New York Times during 1981 spring training. "I think I can start another two or three years. I also think I could pitch out of the bullpen for two or three years a la Steve Hamilton and Jim Kaat. I think I could do that effectively - as long as somebody would want to pay me to do it. Everybody needs lefthanded pitching, especially in the bullpen." He made his first Opening Day start for the Yankees on April 9, allowing three runs (two earned) in eight innings as the Yankees beat the Texas Rangers by a score of 10–3.

His season was interrupted by the 1981 Major League Baseball strike and also by an incident that occurred on August 13. While the John family was at their vacation home on the New Jersey Shore, John's two-year-old son Travis toppled out a window and fell three stories onto the hood of a parked car, ending up in a coma for nearly three weeks. John was warming up for a game against the Tigers when he found out about the accident. He went on national television asking people to pray for his son, and received permission from the Yankees to stay in New York with his son while he recovered, pitching only home games in the immediate aftermath of the accident while staying at the Grand Hyatt Hotel near the N.Y.U. Medical Center. Hundreds of letters and cards poured in from well-wishers, including people who wrote that they hated the Yankees and George Steinbrenner but were rooting for Travis to pull through. President Ronald Reagan sent Travis a get-well card, as did former Presidents Richard Nixon and Jimmy Carter. Frank Sinatra sent a telegram. Travis ultimately made a full recovery; he threw out the first pitch at a playoff game against the Brewers later that year, and by 1988, he was playing Little League Baseball with his brothers.

By August 29, John was back to pitching road games for the Yankees. With a 9–5 record on September 14, he finished the year on a three-game losing streak, though that included a September 25 start against the Orioles where he allowed one run in a complete game, 1–0 loss. In 20 starts, John had a 9–8 record, 50 strikeouts, 39 walks, and 135 hits allowed in 140 1/3 innings pitched. His 2.63 ERA ranked fourth in the AL. Though he had led the AL in shutouts the previous year, he had zero in 1981.

Because of the strike, MLB divided the season into two halves and added an extra playoff round, the Division Series, in which the first half and second-half winners of the two divisions would play each other. The Yankees had the AL East's best record in the first half and faced the Brewers in the Division Series. With the Yankees up two games to none in the best-of-five series, John started Game 3 but gave up five runs in seven innings, taking the loss in a 5–3 defeat. After the Brewers won Game 4, the Yankees won Game 5 to seize the series victory. John allowed just one run against the Athletics in Game 1 of the ALCS, earning the win. He was replaced on the mound by Ron Davis after the sixth inning because his right ankle was bothering him. Though he felt good enough to remain in the game, Yankee manager Bob Lemon did not want to risk further injury: "If something happened, I'd be worried about it all winter," Lemon said. He would not get a chance to pitch again in the series, as New York defeated Oakland in three games. The World Series was the third Dodger–Yankee World Series John had been a part of, though it was his first with New York. He picked up the win in his Game 2 start, retiring the first 12 batters he faced and throwing seven shutout innings in a 3–0 triumph. In Game 4, he was sent in during the seventh inning of a 6–6 tie because the bases were loaded, and John had a propensity for inducing ground balls, which would have likely resulted in an out and possibly a double play. Instead, Steve Yeager hit a sacrifice fly against him, and Davey Lopes added an RBI single; the runs did not count on John's record, but the Yankees lost the game 8–7. With the Yankees down to the Dodgers 3 games to 2, John started Game 6. He held the Dodgers to one run over four innings but was pinch-hit for by Bobby Murcer in the fourth. "I was trying to get a run ahead so I could get to the seventh inning and bring Goose in," explained Lemon. The Yankees failed to score that inning, and the relievers did not pitch well, enabling the Dodgers to win the game and the series. Will Grimsley of the Associated Press called the decision to pull John "a glaring error."

After the 1981 season, John won the Lou Gehrig Memorial Award, presented by Phi Delta Theta to "the Major League Baseball Player who best exemplifies the spirit and character of Brother Lou Gehrig, both on and off the field." The Yankees and John nearly went to arbitration after 1981 but ultimately agreed to a two-year, $1.7 million contract. "I'm glad to get it over with and get it put to bed," John said after signing. "It's like in a marriage. If you have an argument and patch it up fast, it's okay. But the longer you let it go, the harder it is to reconcile it." Through June 25, 1982, though his record was just 5–7, he had a 2.95 ERA. From then through July 5, he posted a 6.67 ERA in six games (five starts). John clashed with the Yankees' front office over the change in his performance and also over their failure to give him a $200,000 loan that was promised in his contract; in early August, the pitcher threatened to start a breach of contract case that would sever his Yankee contract. He did not stay in the bullpen long, as doubleheaders forced the Yankees to require another starter and John pitched well upon his return to the rotation. However, on August 31, he was traded to the California Angels for three minor league players to be named later. In 30 games (26 starts) for the Yankees, John had posted a 10–10 record, a 3.66 ERA, 54 strikeouts, 34 walks, and 190 hits allowed in 186 2/3 innings, throwing two shutouts as well.

=== California Angels (1982–1985) and Oakland Athletics (1985) ===
California was interested in John because it was contending for the AL West title. In his first start with the team on September 3, 1982, John held the Brewers to two runs (neither earned) in a complete game, 5–2 victory. John made seven starts, posting a 4–2 record, a 3.86 ERA, 14 strikeouts, five walks, and 49 hits allowed in 35 innings pitched as the Angels won their division. His combined totals between New York and California were a 14–12 record, a 3.69 ERA, 68 strikeouts, 39 walks, and 239 hits allowed in 221 2/3 innings. John started Game 1 of the ALCS against the Brewers, allowing three runs in a complete game, 8–3 victory. When Game 4 arrived, instead of starting 13-game winner Ken Forsch, manager Gene Mauch opted to start John on three days rest. John gave up six runs (four earned) over 3 1/3 innings as the Brewers defeated the Angels 9–5; the Brewers went on to win the series in five games.

Before the 1983 season, Angel GM Buzzie Bavasi extended John's contract for three years. Assistant GM Mike Port disagreed with the decision because he thought John was too old. California's number two starter, John had a 6–2 record and a 3.43 ERA through June 9. Thereafter, he only won five of 16 decisions, and his ERA was 4.84. Twice, he had extended outings for the Angels. In the second game of a doubleheader against Oakland on July 30, he gave up two runs over 12 innings but took the loss when Rickey Henderson had an RBI single in the 12th to bring home the go-ahead run. Yet that was not his longest outing of the year; he pitched 13 shutout innings on September 14 against the Royals. California never scored, however, and the Angels lost in the 14th once relief pitchers entered the game. In 34 starts, John had an 11–13 record, a 4.33 ERA (the highest it had ever been in his career), 65 strikeouts, and 49 walks in 234 2/3 innings. He led the AL in hits allowed with 287, and 1983 would be the last time he would top 200 innings in a season.

In 1984, John had a 2.48 ERA through June 2 but a 6.13 ERA thereafter. In the second game of a doubleheader against Boston on July 8, though, he threw a complete-game shutout in a 4–0 victory. He was removed from the rotation at the beginning of September when Geoff Zahn came off the disabled list, though he returned for two starts later in the month after Bruce Kison was removed. In 32 games (29 starts), he had a 7–13 record, a 4.52 ERA, 47 strikeouts, 56 walks, and 223 hits allowed in 181 1/3 innings pitched.

Port succeeded Bavasi as the Angel GM in 1985, and no coach worked with John at all during spring training until he finally asked Frank Reberger to assist him. That season, John posted a 4.70 ERA in 12 games, only six of which were starts. In May, the Angels opted to use only four starters for much of the month, and John was the odd man out. The Angels considered trading him for Dick Ruthven of the Cubs but opted not to because Ruthven was owed $400,000 in a deferred salary. In June, John left the team to be with his mother, who was battling cancer. She died on June 19. That same day, the Angels released him. The Oakland Athletics signed him nearly a month later, on July 12; John made three rehab starts in the minor leagues before debuting with Oakland on July 26. He won that game, pitching six innings and allowing one run (unearned) against the Brewers in a 4–3 triumph. Facing the Yankees on August 27, he threw seven shutout innings, allowing just three hits and earning the victory in a 3–0 triumph. Those were his only wins with Oakland, though; he lost his next five decisions and finished with a 2–6 record and a 6.19 ERA in 11 starts. His combined totals for the season were a 4–10 record, a 5.53 ERA, 25 strikeouts, 28 walks, and 117 hits allowed in 86 1/3 innings pitched. After the season, he became a free agent.

=== New York Yankees (second stint) (1986–1989) ===
John went unsigned to begin 1986, and it looked like his career might be over. He attended spring training with the Yankees, though, and though he did not make the roster, the Yankees informed him that they would consider him if they needed pitchers later in the year. Injuries to Ed Whitson and John Montefusco in May prompted the Yankees to re-sign John. Inserted into the rotation, he won his first three decisions for the Yankees before losing a game on June 7. However, on June 12, he was placed on the 21-day disabled list with a strained left Achilles tendon; the injury kept him out of action until August 8. On August 24, rookie Mark McGwire of the Athletics had two hits off him. McGwire's father was John's dentist, and John told reporters, "When your dentist's kid starts hitting you, it's time to retire!" He went on to pitch three more seasons, however. Against the Mariners in the first game of a doubleheader on August 30, he took the loss but allowed just one run in eight innings in what would be his last start of the year. On September 4, he fell down while warming up on muddy soil and injured his left thumb while trying to break his fall, ending his season. In 13 games (10 starts), he had a 5–3 record, a 2.93 ERA, 28 strikeouts, 15 walks, and 73 hits allowed in 70 2/3 innings pitched. He also made three starts for the Class A Fort Lauderdale Yankees, winning two and not allowing an earned run in 13 2/3 innings.

During the 1986 season, John had agreed to become the pitching coach for the University of North Carolina (UNC) later in the year, meaning he would likely retire. However, he resigned from the UNC position on November 21 due to "irreconcilable differences" with head coach Mike Roberts. In his 1991 autobiography, John stated that the reasons he resigned were that Roberts, after promising John two cars and six season tickets to UNC basketball games for coming to work for UNC, tried to cut the deal back to one car and no tickets. Roberts also used John's name on promotional materials for baseball camps without John's permission. After resigning from UNC, John signed a contract to return to the Yankees for $350,000, provided he made the team out of spring training. On April 19 and April 26, 1987, he threw seven shutout innings in consecutive starts, only allowing one hit on the 26th in a 14–2 win over Cleveland. Pitching on three days' rest on August 8, he threw a two-hit shutout against the Tigers, the last he would throw in his career. On October 2, he gave up just one run in a complete game, 3–1 triumph over Baltimore. In 33 starts, John had a 13–6 record, a 4.03 ERA, 63 strikeouts, 47 walks, and 212 hits allowed in 187 2/3 innings pitched.

After Phil Niekro's retirement, John became the oldest player in the major leagues in 1988; he turned 45 on May 22. On April 27, he held the Royals to two hits and no runs in 7 1/3 innings, though Kansas City ultimately won 3–1. For the first time since 1963 (a year he only made three starts), he did not complete a game; his longest outing came on May 14, when he allowed two runs over 8 1/3 innings in a 6–2 victory over the Angels. On July 27, he set a record by committing three errors on one play against the Brewers. First, he dropped a ground ball hit back to the mound by Jeffrey Leonard. Picking it up, he threw it about 10 feet wide of first base. Jim Gantner tried to score, and John cut off a throw to home, then threw it by the head of the catcher, incredibly, for his third error on the play. However, he would pitch eight innings as the Yankees went on to win 16–3. In 35 games (32 starts), he had a 9–8 record, a 4.49 ERA, 81 strikeouts, 46 walks, and 221 hits allowed in 176 1/3 innings. Bill Madden of the New York Daily News speculated that John, a ground-ball pitcher, suffered from late-season injuries to Yankee infielders Willie Randolph and Mike Pagliarulo, their replacements not having been quite as capable fielders. Ten times, he left a game after at least five innings with a lead and received a no-decision, often due to runners he had left on base scoring when relievers replaced him. At 45, he was the only Yankee starting pitcher to go the full year without missing time due to injury.

By 1989, John was doing a "ten-part cardiovascular and muscular endurance program" which Jeff Mangold, the Yankees' former strength coach, had helped him develop. At 45, he was the Opening Day starter for the Yankees, his first Opening Day start for the ballclub in eight years, allowing two runs in seven innings and outpitching 1988 AL Cy Young Award winner Frank Viola as the Yankees defeated the Twins 4–2 on April 4. With the start, John matched Deacon McGuire's record for most MLB seasons played with 26, a record that would later be broken by Nolan Ryan. On April 27, he held the Royals to two runs over eight-plus innings, picking up his 288th (and final) victory. He lost four games in May, though, allowing five or more runs in each of his outings. On May 25, he allowed five runs in 5 1/3 innings against the Angels, in receipt of a no-decision in an 8–6 Yankee victory. That game would be his last appearance for the Yankees, who released him at the end of the month. In 10 starts for New York, John had a 2–7 record, a 5.80 ERA, 18 strikeouts, 22 walks, and 87 hits allowed in 63 2/3 innings.

== Career statistics ==
John finished his career with a 288–231 record, a 3.34 ERA, 2,245 strikeouts, 1,259 walks, and 4,783 hits allowed in 4,710 1/3 innings pitched. After pitching for 26 years, he ranked among baseball's all-time leaders in wins (26th), losses (19th), innings pitched (20th), hits allowed (10th), earned runs allowed (1,749, 16th), games started (700, eighth), shutouts (46, 26th), batters faced (19,692, 18th), and wild pitches (187, 17th). He had 188 career no decisions, an all-time MLB record among starting pitchers (dating back to at least 1908). Of Hall-of-Fame-eligible pitchers since 1900, Roger Clemens (whose career is tainted by steroids allegations) is the only one with more wins than John not to be elected to the Hall of Fame. (Note: Bobby Matthews, who pitched from 1871 to 1887, won 297 games but is not in the Hall of Fame.)

Though John was nearing the 300-win club at the end of his career, he had not necessarily intended to pitch long enough to reach the milestone. "You'd like to stay around long enough to win 300, but that's not the ultimate goal for me," he said in 1987. "My kids are getting older, and it's tougher for us to move as much as we used to. I decided that wherever we go, we go as a group. The kids have a lifetime contract with us." After the Yankees released him in 1989, he planned to keep working out and throwing in case another team signed him. None did, however, and the season was his last.

== National Baseball Hall of Fame consideration ==
John first appeared on the Baseball Hall of Fame ballot in 1995. He earned 21.3% of the vote, but 75% is required for induction. Over the next several years, his vote totals rose and fell, but through 2008, he had never received more than 29.6% of the vote. In 2009, in his 15th and final year of eligibility for election on the main ballot, John received an eligibility-high 31.7% of the vote, but this was still not enough for election. He could still enter the Hall if he were selected by the Modern Era Subcommittee of the Veterans Committee. John was announced as one of the finalists for the 2020 Modern Baseball Era ballot; however, he was not one of the inductees. He appeared on the Classic Baseball Era Committee's 2025 ballot, but only received seven of the necessary 12 votes required for election.

In a Yahoo! Sports article in 2017, Chris Cwik discussed the pros and cons of John's Hall of Fame case. Pros, Cwik mentioned were that his 111 Adjusted ERA+ was better than that of Sutton or Early Wynn (both Hall of Famers) and that his surgery has revolutionized the game. Cons were that he never led the league in wins or strikeouts or won a Cy Young Award, and his 288 wins and 3.34 ERA were more "borderline" Hall of Fame credentials. Craig Calcaterra of NBC Sports also did a pro-con analysis in 2019. On the pro side, Calcaterra noted that he was above average during his long career; on the con side, he too noted that John never led the league in wins or strikeouts, writing "John was simply not dominant in any way—his ERA+ was a not-very-Hall-of-Famer-111—even if he was pretty darn dependable and even if he ate innings like crazy." Analyzing John's wins above replacement value on several statistical sites (ranging from over 60 to 79.1), Brett Ballantini of Sports Illustrated said in 2020, "This is a guy who, irrespective of any surgery named after him, is a guy whose baseball career alone simply says he's a Hall of Famer." In a 2016 interview, John pointed out that his 164 wins following the surgery were one shy of the amount that Hall of Famer Sandy Koufax had over his entire career.

== Legacy ==
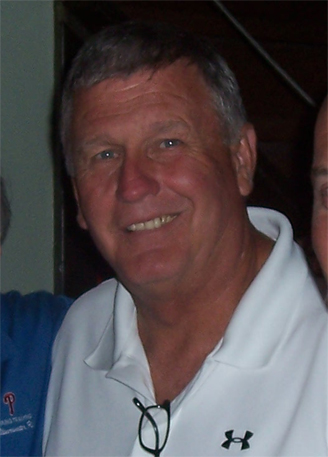
John in 2008

John went on to win 164 games after having the surgery, 40 more than before. His successful comeback proved once and for all that baseball players could still be successful after undergoing major surgery. In 2012, Lindsey Berra of ESPN noted that roughly one in seven major league pitchers had undergone Tommy John surgery at some point in their careers. "It's become an accepted side effect of the job," said George Paletta, team physician for the St. Louis Cardinals. Doug Miller of MLB.com wrote that "baseball history was altered – some would say saved – forever" when John returned from his recovery, observing that "Today, the tearing of a pitcher's ulnar collateral ligament is no longer a career-ending calamity." Sportscasters Dan Patrick and Bob Costas discussed the impact that Tommy John surgery has had on the game, stating in 2012 that there could be a case for John being awarded the Buck O'Neil Lifetime Achievement Award. The initial Tommy John surgery, John's subsequent return to pitching success, and his relationship with Jobe was the subject of an ESPN 30 for 30 Shorts documentary in 2013.

== Pitching style ==
John was a soft throwing sinkerball pitcher whose technique resulted in batters hitting numerous ground balls which often induced double plays. In 1980, Dave Anderson of The New York Times estimated that his fastball was about 92 miles per hour. "It sinks sharply away from right-handed batters, and it sinks into left-handed batters," Anderson wrote. Rick Cerone, who caught John with the Yankees, said of the fastball, "It looks like a real good pitch to hit until about the last 10 feet, then it sinks about two or three inches outside. When the batters try to pull it, they just hit these little grounders." At the start of his major league career, John threw just a fastball and a curveball. The Indians tried to get him to throw a slider in 1964, but John struggled with it and went back to throwing two pitches later that year. By 1980, he was throwing the slider. He also threw three different curveballs by then, classifying them by their release point: "Each one breaks differently, down or flat or in between, depending on how you spin it." In 1972, he added a screwball, which he used as a changeup to complement his repertoire. His arm lagged behind the rest of his body when he threw pitches, a technique that put extra stress on it, which contributed to his UCL injury in 1974. John tried to emulate Whitey Ford's pitching style, and he studied books on pitching by Christy Mathewson, Bob Feller, and Bob Shaw.

== Broadcasting ==
Between his stints with the Angels and Athletics in 1985, John served as color commentator alongside Tim McCarver for a game between the White Sox and the Athletics on ABC's Monday Night Baseball on June 24. Following his career, John did broadcasting for several different teams. From 1994 through 1996, he served as a broadcaster for the Twins. In 1997, John served as the color commentator for the Charlotte Knights of the International League, also performing a public relations role for the ballclub. John returned to New York in 1998 to do commentary on select games during WPIX's final year of broadcasting Yankees games. On June 26, 2008, he guest-hosted the Mike and Mike ESPN Radio program.

== Coaching career ==
John started his coaching career at Furman University. During the 2002 season, John joined the Montreal Expos' organization, serving as the pitching coach for the Harrisburg Senators of the Eastern League before managing the Maryvale in the Arizona Fall League. In 2003, he was promoted to coach the Triple-A Edmonton Trappers of the Pacific Coast League. Next year, the Yankees got permission from the Expos to interview John, and New York hired him to be the pitching coach for the Staten Island Yankees.

On December 17, 2006, John was named manager of the Bridgeport Bluefish in the Atlantic League. The fifth manager in team history, he compiled a 159–176 win–loss record in two and a half seasons with Bridgeport. John resigned on July 8, 2009, to pursue a "non-baseball position" with Sportable Scoreboards. Frank Boulton, the team owner and CEO, publicly thanked John for his contributions. While still managing the Bluefish, he became the spokesman for Tommy John's Go-Flex, a joint cream for older athletes manufactured by New Vitality.

== Personal life ==
George Vecsey of The New York Times described John as "a churchgoer, a good-natured family man." On July 13, 1970, Tommy married the former Sally Simmons. They are the parents of four children: Tamara, Tommy III, Travis, and Taylor. In 2014, John moved to La Quinta, California, with his girlfriend, Cheryl Zeldin, to whom, as of January 2022 he was betrothed.

In 1998, Tamara John married Patrick Mannelly, who later became a long snapper for the Chicago Bears. The two met at Duke University. As a 10-year-old in 1992, Taylor's singing and acting talents landed him a role in Les Misérables on Broadway. He also played Little League Baseball, as did his brothers. On March 9, 2010, Taylor died at the age of 28 as the result of a seizure and heart failure apparently due to an overdose of prescription drugs. "He was the greatest kid in the world, but he would get into these panic spells and deep abysses," John said of Taylor. "He was wired different than the rest of us." John started the "Let's Do It" Foundation, dedicated to raising awareness about suicides and preventing them.

John's oldest son, Tommy III, played baseball for the Furman University Paladins. He was a 4-year letterman, leading the team in complete games as a pitcher in 1997 (3 games) and in home runs (9) in 1999, a year in which he was named an All-Southern Conference player. In 2000, he became one of three players in the history of Furman's varsity baseball team to hit for the cycle, doing so on April 1 against the Appalachian State Mountaineers. After graduating from Furman, he spent two seasons in the independent minor leagues as a pitcher for the Tyler Roughnecks and Schaumburg Flyers. Tommy III is a chiropractor and wrote the book, Minimize Injury, Maximize Performance: A Sports Parent's Survival Guide, which discusses the injury risk associated with young athletes specializing in one specific sport and suggests ways to prevent youth from ever having to undergo major sports-related surgery, such as Tommy John surgery.

John's hometown of Terre Haute, Indiana, presented him a key to the city on September 1, 1989, and Indiana governor Evan Bayh presented him with the Sagamore of the Wabash, Indiana's highest honor. On October 24, 2013, the Terre Haute Parks Department honored John by renaming Spencer Field after him. The complex was the site of John's last non-professional game in 1961, when he was a member of the Terre Haute Gerstmeyer High School Black Cats.

John overcame his stuttering problem and earned a reputation as one of baseball's most talkative players. "Ask Tommy John what time it is, and he'll tell you how to make a watch," said former teammate and manager Bob Lemon. Following his career, John became a motivational speaker. He has no relation to the Tommy John Underwear company and considered suing the founder over the use of his name but abandoned the idea after attorneys wanted $250,000 to represent him. In 2019, he said he was no longer watching baseball, considering the game unrecognizable. He was inducted into the Baseball Reliquary's Shrine of the Eternals in 2018.

=== Health and death ===
Prior to the Yankees' 2026 Old-Timers' Day festivities, they shared a statement from John on X, announcing that John was dealing with health problems in his Bradenton, Florida, home. John's statement included, "I want to thank the Yankees organization and the Steinbrenner family for giving me this opportunity to say goodbye to everyone, along with all the friends and fans who followed me throughout my 26-year career." John faced a recurrence of bladder cancer alongside other health complications, but neither his letter nor the Yankees' post made any connection to that or any other specific health conditions.

Tommy John died at his home on August 15, 2026, at the age of 83, after spending his final days in hospice care.

== Bibliography ==
- The Tommy John Story, F.H. Revell Company, 1978. ISBN 0-8007-0923-3. (With Sally John and Joe Musser, foreword by Tommy Lasorda.)
- The Sally and Tommy John Story: Our Life in Baseball, Macmillan, 1983. ISBN 0-02-559260-2. (With Sally John.)
- TJ: My Twenty-Six Years in Baseball, Bantam, 1991. ISBN 0-553-07184-X. (With Dan Valenti.)

== See also ==
- List of Major League Baseball career wins leaders
- List of Major League Baseball career hit batsmen leaders
- List of Major League Baseball career strikeout leaders

== Notes ==
Awards
Preceded by Davey Johnson	National League Player of the Month; April 1974	Succeeded by Ralph Garr
