= Marv Staehle =

American baseball player (1942–2022)

- Second baseman
- Born: March 13, 1942; Oak Park, Illinois, U.S.
- Died: September 30, 2022 (aged 80); Lake Geneva, Wisconsin, U.S.
- Batted: Left Threw: Right

MLB debut
- September 15, 1964, for the Chicago White Sox

Last MLB appearance
- June 13, 1971, for the Atlanta Braves

MLB statistics
- Batting average: .207
- Home runs: 1
- Runs batted in: 33
- Stats at Baseball Reference

Teams
- Chicago White Sox (1964–1967); Montreal Expos (1969–1970); Atlanta Braves (1971)

Marvin Gustave Staehle (/ˈsteɪliː/ STAY-lee; March 13, 1942 – September 30, 2022) was an American Major League Baseball second baseman. He played for the Chicago White Sox (1964–1967), Montreal Expos (1969–1970), and the Atlanta Braves (1971). He stood 5 feet 10 inches (1.78 m) tall and weighed 165 pounds (75 kg).

== Career ==
Staehle attended Western Illinois University and originally signed with his hometown White Sox. He was an accomplished hitter in minor league baseball, leading the Double-A Sally League in batting average (.337) with the 1963 Nashville Vols and batting .286 overall in 1,239 minor league games. However, he struggled in the Major Leagues. In his only full MLB season, with the 1970 Expos, the left-handed swinging Staehle platooned with right-handed hitter Gary Sutherland as Montreal's second baseman. He appeared in 104 games, but batted only .218 in 321 at bats.

During his 185-game, seven-year MLB career, he batted .207 with 97 hits, 1 home run, and 33 runs batted in.
