= Bill Voss =

American baseball player (1943–2023)

- Outfielder
- Born: October 31, 1943; Glendale, California, U.S.
- Died: December 28, 2023 (aged 80)
- Batted: Left Threw: Left

MLB debut
- September 14, 1965, for the Chicago White Sox

Last MLB appearance
- September 23, 1972, for the Oakland Athletics

MLB statistics
- Batting average: .227
- Home runs: 19
- Runs batted in: 127
- Stats at Baseball Reference

Teams
- Chicago White Sox (1965–1968); California Angels (1969–1970); Milwaukee Brewers (1971–1972); St. Louis Cardinals (1972); Oakland Athletics (1972)

William Edward Voss (October 31, 1943 – December 28, 2023) was an American professional baseball player who played eight seasons for the Chicago White Sox, California Angels, Milwaukee Brewers, St. Louis Cardinals, and Oakland Athletics of Major League Baseball. He was traded from the Cardinals to the Cincinnati Reds for Pat Jacquez at the Winter Meetings on November 27, 1972.

Voss graduated from Newport Harbor High School in Newport Beach, CA. in 1961. He then attended Orange Coast College for two years, and then attended Long Beach State College. He was signed as an amateur free agent by the Detroit Tigers in 1963 and then drafted by the Chicago White Sox in the first Major League Baseball draft in 1964.

Voss died on December 28, 2023, at the age of 80.
