= Tommy McCraw =

American baseball player and coach (born 1940)

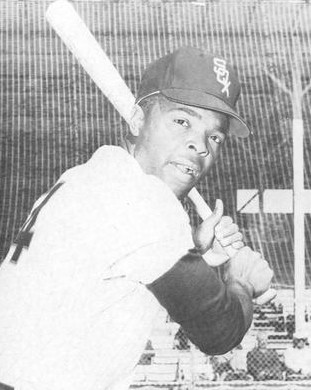
- First baseman / Outfielder
- Born: November 21, 1940 (age 85); Malvern, Arkansas, U.S.
- Batted: Left Threw: Left

MLB debut
- June 4, 1963, for the Chicago White Sox

Last MLB appearance
- June 24, 1975, for the Cleveland Indians

MLB statistics
- Batting average: .246
- Home runs: 75
- Runs batted in: 404
- Stats at Baseball Reference

Teams
- Chicago White Sox (1963–1970); Washington Senators (1971); Cleveland Indians (1972); California Angels (1973–1974); Cleveland Indians (1974–1975)

Tommy Lee McCraw (born November 21, 1940) is an American former professional baseball player and coach. He played in Major League Baseball (MLB) as a first baseman and outfielder for the Chicago White Sox (1963–70), Washington Senators (1971), Cleveland Indians (1972 and 1974–75) and California Angels (1973–74).

== Biography ==
The native of Malvern, Arkansas, stood 6 feet (1.8 m) tall and weighed 183 pounds (83 kg) during his playing days. He batted and threw left-handed. In 13 big-league seasons he played in 1,468 games and had 3,956 at bats, 484 runs, 972 hits, 150 doubles, 42 triples, 75 home runs, 404 RBI, 143 stolen bases, 332 walks, .246 batting average, .309 on-base percentage, .362 slugging percentage, 1,431 total bases, 42 sacrifice hits, 26 sacrifice flies and 48 intentional walks.

On September 30, 1971, McCraw made the last offensive play for the Washington Senators franchise, when he was caught stealing second for the Senators final out of their final game in the bottom of the 8th against the New York Yankees.

McCraw was also involved in a bizarre play against his future team, the Indians, at Robert F. Kennedy Memorial Stadium on May 17 of that year. Leading off the bottom of the 4th inning, he hit a 140-foot pop-up (some sources say it was 250 feet) for what should have been an out. Instead, shortstop Jack Heidemann, left fielder John Lowenstein and center fielder Vada Pinson collided going for the ball, which fell amongst the trio. All three players were injured and had to be replaced. McCraw circled the bases for what would be scored an inside-the-park home run.

McCraw was the first player in Angels history to serve as a designated hitter. He went 1-for-4 in the Angels' 1973 season opener, a 3-2 victory over the Kansas City Royals at Anaheim Stadium.

McCraw enjoyed a long career as a batting coach after his active career ended, logging 24 seasons on the Major League staffs of the Cleveland Indians (1975; 1979–82), San Francisco Giants (1983–85), Baltimore Orioles (1989–91), New York Mets (1992–96), Houston Astros (1997–2000), and Montreal Expos/Washington Nationals (2002–05). He served under manager Frank Robinson on four different teams.
