= Pete Ward =

Canadian baseball player (1937–2022)

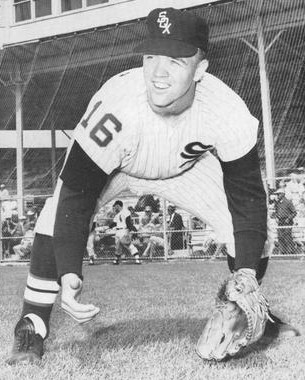
- Third baseman / Left fielder / First baseman
- Born: July 26, 1937; Montreal, Quebec, Canada
- Died: March 16, 2022 (aged 84); Lake Oswego, Oregon, U.S.
- Batted: Left Threw: Right

MLB debut
- September 21, 1962, for the Baltimore Orioles

Last MLB appearance
- September 25, 1970, for the New York Yankees

MLB statistics
- Batting average: .254
- Home runs: 98
- Runs batted in: 427
- Stats at Baseball Reference

Teams
- Baltimore Orioles (1962); Chicago White Sox (1963–1969); New York Yankees (1970)

Member of the Canadian

Baseball Hall of Fame
- Induction: 1991

Peter Thomas Ward (July 26, 1937 – March 16, 2022) was a Canadian-born professional baseball player who appeared in 973 games over nine seasons in Major League Baseball as a third baseman, outfielder and first baseman for the Baltimore Orioles (1962), Chicago White Sox (1963–1969) and New York Yankees (1970).

Ward was the runner-up for the American League (AL) Rookie of the Year Award (to pitcher and teammate Gary Peters) in 1963, but was named that season's AL Rookie of the Year by The Sporting News. He finished in the Top 10 in the AL's Most Valuable Player poll in both 1963 (ninth) and 1964 (sixth).

== Early life ==
Ward was born in Montréal, on July 26, 1937. Ward's family moved to Portland, Oregon when Ward was eight years old. He was the son of former National Hockey League forward Jimmy Ward, who played 11 seasons for the Montreal Maroons and Montreal Canadiens. Jimmy had been hired to coach the Portland Eagles of the Western Hockey League, and became a longtime coach in professional and amateur hockey in Portland. While Ward's brother continued on in hockey (playing at Michigan State University from 1951 to 1955), Ward discovered baseball in Portland.

Ward attended Portland's Jefferson High School, graduating in 1955. He was an All-State shortstop at Jefferson. In 1986, he was inducted into the Portland Interscholastic League Hall of Fame. He starred in college baseball at Lewis & Clark College of the Northwest Conference located in Portland, also playing shortstop. Ward was a member of the Northwest Conference All-Star teams in 1957 and 1958. He was the first Lewis & Clark player to play in major league baseball.

== Playing career ==
Ward batted left-handed, threw right-handed, and was listed as 6 feet 1 inch (1.85 m) tall and 185 pounds (84 kg) (13 stone, 3 pounds).

=== Minor league ===
Ward signed with the Orioles in 1958, as a shortstop. In 1959, he was assigned to the Stockton Ports of the Class C California League, where he played principally at third base (63 games), but also at shortstop (36 games), and second base (15 games). In 1960, playing Class B baseball for the Fox City Foxes of the Illinois-Indiana-Iowa League (the Three-I League), he played 114 games at third base and 21 in the outfield. In 1961, he played for two different Double-A teams, playing only 10 games at third base and 109 games among the three outfield positions. In 1962, his last year of minor league baseball, he played 80 games at third base and 83 in the outfield for the Triple-A Rochester Red Wings. He joined the Orioles at the end of the 1962 season, playing solely in the outfield.

Ward batted over .300 at three levels of minor league baseball and won the batting title in the Three-I League in 1960 with a .345 mark. In 1962 at Rochester, he hit .328, with 22 home runs, 114 runs scored and 90 runs batted in (RBI). After he was selected to the International League All-Star Team in 1962 as an outfielder, Ward received a September trial with Baltimore, where he hit .143 with two doubles in 21 at bats.

Although he would be known in the major leagues as a third baseman, the big-league Orioles possessed future Baseball Hall of Famer Brooks Robinson, only two months older than Ward (May 18, 1937), at the position. By the time Ward was called up in 1962, Robinson had been the Orioles starting third baseman for years, was an All-Star (1960–1962) and was about to win his third Gold Glove Award at third base. Ward knew he would not be playing third base for the Orioles, and the plan was to move Boog Powell from the outfield to first base, and then play Ward in the outfield.

=== Major league ===
On January 14, 1963, Ward was included in one of the off-season's biggest transactions when the Orioles traded him, future Hall of Fame pitcher Hoyt Wilhelm, shortstop Ron Hansen and outfielder Dave Nicholson to the White Sox for shortstop and future Hall of Famer Luis Aparicio and veteran outfielder Al Smith. In 1963, the White Sox installed Ward as their regular third-baseman, and he responded with a stellar rookie campaign: 177 hits (second in the league), 34 doubles (again second in the AL), 22 home runs, and a .295 batting average (fifth in the league). Chicago won 94 games and finished second to the Yankees. In 1964, Ward avoided the "sophomore jinx" by hitting .282 with 23 home runs and a career-best 94 runs batted in, as the White Sox battled the Yankees and Orioles to the wire before finishing second by a single game.

Ward suffered a neck injury in a 1965 automobile accident, that also injured teammate Tommy John's neck, affecting the remainder of Ward's career. Ward also suffered from back problems in 1966. His production fell off in 1965, when he hit only .247 in 138 games. Troubled by his injuries, he would fail to reach the .250 mark for the rest of his Chicago tenure.

He appeared in only 84 games in 1966, and although he was able to play regularly as the White Sox' left fielder in 1967 and third baseman in 1968, only his power numbers (18 and 15 home runs) remained robust. He was traded to the Yankees in December 1969 for pitcher Mickey Scott and cash, and played a single season for the 1970 Yankees as a pinch hitter and back-up first baseman to Danny Cater, a former White Sox teammate in 1965–66; with only 77 at bats and 13 games in the field at first base. He was released by the Yankees in March 1971. For his nine-year MLB career, Ward amassed 776 hits, including 136 doubles, 17 triples and 98 home runs; he batted .254 with 427 career runs batted in.

He related that during his tenure with the Sox, his team engaged in sign stealing that involved a scout on a chair next to the flagpole at center field with binoculars. The scout would signal a pitch based on if he sat on the chair, stood up, or leaned on a pole, although Ward stated that it would sometimes confuse a hitter's swing.

== Manager and coach ==
After serving as a minor league coach for the Rochester Red Wings in the early 70s, under manager Joe Altobelli, Ward rejoined the Yankees as a minor-league manager (1972–1977) at the Single-A (Fort Lauderdale Yankees), Double-A (West Haven Yankees) and Triple-A (Syracuse Chiefs) levels. He served one season as the first base coach (1978) for Bobby Cox with the Atlanta Braves, before returning to manage in the minors. In 1980, he managed the Iowa Oaks of the Triple-A American Association (a White Sox affiliate), and in 1981 he managed his hometown Portland Beavers in the Triple-A Pacific Coast League (a Pittsburgh Pirates affiliate).

== Honors ==
He was inducted into the Oregon Sports Hall of Fame, the Canadian Baseball Hall of Fame, and the Chicagoland Sports Hall of Fame. In 1963, he came in second to teammate pitcher Gary Peters in rookie of the year voting (10 votes to 6), although The Sporting News did name him its rookie of the year.

Ward was supposed to be featured on the June 7, 1965 cover of Sports Illustrated, but was replaced with a photo from Muhammad Ali's fight against Sonny Liston, that had taken place on May 25, 1965, in Bangor, Maine.

In 1964, he was named Oregon's Athlete of the Year at Portland's Haywood Banquet of Champions.

== Personal life ==
After retiring as a manager, Ward opened a travel related business in Lake Oswego, Oregon. He was a founding member of the Kruse Way Rotary Club and active in the Lake Oswego Chamber of commerce.

== Death ==
Ward died on March 16, 2022, at the age of 84. He was survived by his wife Margaret, two sons, seven grandchildren and five great-grandchildren.
