= Gary Peters (baseball) =

American baseball player (1937–2023)

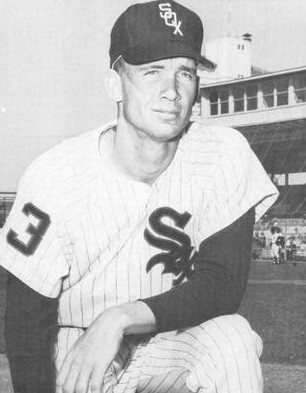
- Peters in 1965
- Pitcher
- Born: April 21, 1937; Grove City, Pennsylvania, U.S.
- Died: January 26, 2023 (aged 85); Sarasota, Florida, U.S.
- Batted: Left Threw: Left

MLB debut
- September 10, 1959, for the Chicago White Sox

Last MLB appearance
- September 23, 1972, for the Boston Red Sox

MLB statistics
- Win–loss record: 124–103
- Earned run average: 3.25
- Strikeouts: 1,420
- Stats at Baseball Reference

Teams
- Chicago White Sox (1959–1969); Boston Red Sox (1970–1972)

Career highlights and awards
- 2× All-Star (1964, 1967); AL Rookie of the Year (1963); AL wins leader (1964); 2× AL ERA leader (1963, 1966)

Gary Charles Peters (April 21, 1937 – January 26, 2023) was an American professional baseball player. He was a left-handed Major League Baseball pitcher who played on two major league teams for 14 seasons, from 1959 through 1972. He was one of the best-hitting pitchers of his era.

== Early life and education ==
Peters was born on April 21, 1937, in Grove City, Pennsylvania, to Thomas and Elizabeth (Rowe) Peters. He attended Mercer High School and Grove City College.

At Mercer High School, he starred in basketball, leading the team to three regional championships. In his senior year in 1955, he was named All-State Pennsylvania. His school did not have a baseball team. Peters said he played sandlot, semi-pro, baseball. In 2024, he was posthumously inducted into Mercer's Athletic Hall of Fame.

In 1956, after signing a professional baseball contract as an amateur free agent with the Chicago White Sox, he attended Grove City College, where he majored in mathematics. Peters father knew White Sox scout Fred Schaffer, and they worked out an agreement where the White Sox would pay for Peters to go to college in the fall and spring, while playing minor league baseball in the summer. He stopped playing basketball midway through his junior year, to focus on baseball, but continued as a student, earning a degree in 1959.

== Minor league baseball ==
In 1956, the White Sox assigned Peters to the Holdrege White Sox of the Class-D Nebraska State League. As a pitcher, Peters had 10-5 win-loss record and 2.81 earned run average (ERA), striking out 142 batters in 128 innings. As a hitter, he had a .321 batting average, .512 slugging percentage, and .872 OPS. He played almost completely in the White Sox minor league system from 1956 through 1962, including three years in Triple-A baseball, two for the San Diego Padres of the Pacific Coast League (1960-1961) and a final year for the Indianapolis Indians of the American Association. His respective ERA over these three years were 4.34, 3.59, and 3.69. Peters learned to pitch with control in the minor leagues from White Sox pitching coach Ray Berres.

== Major league baseball ==
=== Chicago White Sox ===
After four brief call-ups (1959-1962), Peters played his first full season with the White Sox in 1963, pitching in 41 games and starting 30 games. Peters won 19 games with only eight losses (including 11 consecutive wins), with a league leading 2.33 ERA. He also won the American League Rookie of the Year Award. He was eighth in Most Valuable Player (MVP) voting. He allowed only .3 home runs per nine innings, leading both leagues. He also had the highest batting average of any pitcher in major league baseball (.259), with three home runs and 12 runs batted in (RBI). In July 1963, he threw a one-hitter against the Baltimore Orioles, with the only hit a bloop single by opposing pitcher Robin Roberts.

In 1964, Peters had an American League leading 20 wins (20-8 record), with a 2.50 ERA. This was the highest win total of his career. He was selected to the All-Star Team for the first time, and was seventh in MVP voting. He also had four home runs and 19 RBIs as a hitter. Three of the top 10 ERA pitchers in the American League were White Sox (Peters, Joe Horlen, and Juan Pizarro), but the team batting average was .247, with only 106 home runs. The White Sox finished in second place in the American League (98-64), only one game behind the New York Yankees.

In 1965, Peters fell off to a 10-12 record with a 3.62 ERA. He was limited by a bad back. Tommy John, who lived with him part of the year, recalled that Peters had to sleep on a mattress on the floor and could not stand up straight in the mornings. He is also reported as having suffered a groin injury that year. Peters said the groin injury in 1965 affected his pitching delivery.

He rebounded in 1966, with a league leading 1.98 ERA. He made his second All-Star team in 1967, allowing only one hit in three innings and striking out Willie Mays. He had a 16-11 record, with a 2.28 ERA, and a career-best 215 strikeouts. He was ninth in MVP voting. 1967 would be the last season in which Peters excelled as a pitcher.

Peters suffered a serious back injury early in the 1968 season during a pinch hitting at bat, that continued to plague him through later life; resulting in one of his legs appearing shorter than the other. His ERA rose by nearly 1.5 runs from the previous year, and he had a 4-13 record. He did lead all pitchers in fielding average in 1968. In 1969, Peters suffered an arm injury in spring training (later diagnosed as a rotator cuff injury). His ERA rose to 4.53, with a 10-15 record. In December 1969, he was traded to the Boston Red Sox.

=== Boston Red Sox ===
Peters played for the Red Sox from 1970-1972, with win-loss records of 16-11 (34 starts) and 14-11 (32 starts) in his first two years. In 1972, he appeared in 33 games, but only started four, ending with a 3-3 record. He was released by the Red Sox on October 27, 1972.

=== Legacy ===
Peters had a 124-103 career record with a 3.25 ERA and 1,420 strikeouts in 359 appearances (286 starts), and a WAR of 28.7. As a hitter, he had a .222 lifetime batting average, with hit 19 home runs and 102 RBIs. He was frequently used as a pinch-hitter, once winning a game with a pinch-hit home run against the Kansas City Athletics in the bottom of the 13th inning. On May 5, 1968, Peters hit a grand slam in Comiskey Park, helping the White Sox to a 5–1 victory over the New York Yankees. Four of his 19 home runs were hit as a pinch hitter. He was also used as a pinch-runner.

At the time of his death, Peters's 1,098 strikeouts with the White Sox were the eighth most in team history.

For both the White Sox and Red Sox, Peters was a player representative to the Major League Baseball Players Association. In 1972, he was also an American League representative, participating in meetings that led to the first players' strike.

Peters was a big practical joker. Once, when the White Sox went to play the Los Angeles Angels, they found themselves at the same hotel as the Yankees, who had not left for their next destination yet. Obtaining the key to Joe Pepitone's room, Peters snuck into the hitter's room in the middle of the night and started jumping on the bed and screaming, scaring the hitter tremendously until Pepitone finally got the lights turned on and figured out what had happened. Another time, he caught a baby octopus while skindiving and threw it at Ed Stroud in the locker room the next day.

== Honors ==
On September 30, 2000, the Chicago White Sox announced that Gary Peters and 26 other former and active White Sox players were members of the Chicago White Sox All-Century Team.

== Personal life and death ==
On January 26, 2023, it was announced that Peters had died at the age of 85.

== Major League stats ==
Years	Games	W	L	ShO	IP	CG	R	ER	SO	ERA	Fld%
14	359	124	103	23	2081	79	847	751	1420	3.25	.966

== MLB awards ==
- American League All-Star (1964, 1967)
- American League Rookie of the Year (1963)

== MLB achievements ==
- American League leader in ERA (1963, 1966)
- American League leader in wins (1964)
- American League leader in fielding average as pitcher (1968)
- American League pennant team (1959)
- 20-game winner (1964)
- Chicago White Sox All-Century Team (2000)

== See also ==
- List of Major League Baseball annual ERA leaders
- List of Major League Baseball annual wins leaders
- List of Major League Baseball all-time leaders in home runs by pitchers
