= Joe Horlen =

American baseball player (1937–2022)

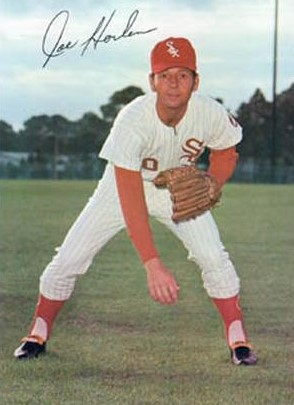
- Pitcher
- Born: August 14, 1937; San Antonio, Texas, U.S.
- Died: April 10, 2022 (aged 84); San Antonio, Texas, U.S.
- Batted: Right Threw: Right

MLB debut
- September 4, 1961, for the Chicago White Sox

Last MLB appearance
- October 4, 1972, for the Oakland Athletics

MLB statistics
- Win–loss record: 116–117
- Earned run average: 3.11
- Strikeouts: 1,065
- Stats at Baseball Reference

Teams
- Chicago White Sox (1961–1971); Oakland Athletics (1972)

Career highlights and awards
- All-Star (1967); World Series champion (1972); AL ERA leader (1967); Pitched a no-hitter on September 10, 1967

Joel Edward Horlen (August 14, 1937 – April 10, 2022) was an American professional baseball pitcher. He played in Major League Baseball (MLB) from 1961 to 1972 for the Chicago White Sox and Oakland Athletics. In references, he is called Joe Horlen or Joel Horlen with roughly equal frequency.

From 1964 to 1968, Horlen led all American League pitchers with a 2.32 earned run average (ERA). In his career, Horlen won 116 games against 117 losses, with a 3.11 ERA and 1,065 strikeouts in 2,002 innings pitched.

He is the only baseball player to play for teams that won a Pony League World Series (1952), a College World Series (Oklahoma State, 1959), and a Major League World Series (Oakland, 1972).

== Early life ==
Horlen was born on August 14, 1937, in San Antonio, Texas. He attended Luther Burbank High School, in San Antonio. Horlen attended high school contemporaneously with future major league pitcher Gary Bell, graduating one year later. Both he and Bell were inducted into the San Antonio Independent School District Athletic Hall of Fame in 2017.

Horlen attended Oklahoma State University and played college baseball for the Oklahoma State Cowboys. He was named to the American Baseball Coaches Association All-America second team, and first-team All-Big Eight, as he helped lead Oklahoma State to victory in the 1959 College World Series.

He was named to the All-Tournament Team, with a 2–0 record (pitching two complete games), 1.99 ERA, and tournament leading 18 strikeouts. In his two years on the team, he was 15-4, with a 2.26 ERA, and 128 strikeouts in 143 1/3 innings.

== Minor league career ==
Horlen was signed by the Chicago White Sox in 1959. That year he pitched for the Lincoln Chiefs. The next season he pitched in Single-A for the Charleston White Sox, and had a 7–5 win–loss record with a 2.93 earned run average (ERA). He began 1961 pitching for the Triple-A San Diego Padres, for whom he was 12–9 with a 2.51 ERA.

== Major league career ==
=== Chicago White Sox (1961–1971) ===
Horlen made his Major League debut against the Minnesota Twins in the second game of a September 4, 1961 doubleheader. He won the game in relief while wearing a numberless uniform, as the only available road uniform did not have a number. Horlen pitched as a spot starter in his first two full seasons with the White Sox. In 1963, he returned to the minors to pitch four games for the Triple-A Indianapolis Indians, going 3–0 with a 1.74 ERA.

In 1964, he earned a spot in the starting rotation, posting a 13–9 record and setting career bests in ERA (1.88; second in the American League only to Dean Chance's 1.65) and strikeouts (138), as the White Sox finished with a record of 98-64. He also led the majors by allowing only 6.07 hits per nine innings, bettering Sandy Koufax's National League-leading 6.22. In the next 42 years, only eight right-handed pitchers bettered that ratio in a season. He also led the AL in Walks + Hits per IP (WHIP) (.935), just .007 behind Koufax. That year his White Sox battled the New York Yankees and Baltimore Orioles for the pennant, but finished second, one game behind the Yankees and one game ahead of the Orioles. Three of the top 10 ERA pitchers in the American League were White Sox (Horlen, Gary Peters, and Juan Pizarro), but the team batting average was .247, with only 106 home runs.

In 1965, Horlen was second in the league in shutouts (four), and was third in walks/9 IP (1.60), with a 2.88 ERA. In 1966, he led the league in wild pitches (14), was sixth in hit batsmen (six), and was second in ERA (2.43) behind teammate Gary Peters.

Horlen finished the 1967 season with a 19–7 record and led American League pitchers with a 2.06 ERA and six shutouts, was second in W-L percentage (.731), fourth in wins, complete games (13), and walks/9 IP (2.02), and 7th in innings pitched (258). He also led the AL in walks plus hits per inning pitched (WHIP) (.953). He was named to the American League All-Star team for the only time in his career, but did not pitch in the game.

On September 10, Horlen threw a no-hitter as the White Sox were involved in a four-way pennant race with the Twins, Boston Red Sox, and Detroit Tigers. The only Detroit player to reach base was Bill Freehan, who was hit by a Horlen pitch. Horlen recorded victories in his next three starts, including one five days later against the Twins. However, on September 27, which would be known by fans as "Black Wednesday", the lowly Kansas City Athletics swept a doubleheader from the White Sox and effectively eliminated Eddie Stanky's "Hitless Wonders" (the White Sox led the Majors with a 2.45 earned run average but also posted a .225 batting average, with no regular batting above .250) from pennant contention.

Horlen lost the second game, as 21-year-old Catfish Hunter shut out the White Sox 4–0. The two games were the last played by the Athletics in Kansas City before the team moved to Oakland for the start of the 1968 season. The White Sox finished fourth, three games behind the Red Sox who, after finishing next to last in 1966, won the pennant on the final day, finishing one game ahead of the Twins and Tigers. Horlen finished runner-up to Jim Lonborg, the star of the Red Sox staff, in the American League Cy Young Award balloting, and fourth in Most Valuable Player (MVP) voting, won by Boston's Carl Yastrzemski.

In 1968 Horlen led the AL in hit batsmen (14). In 1970 he was fifth in bases on balls per nine innings pitched (2.14). In 1971, he had knee surgery early in the season. In spring training of 1972, the White Sox released Horlen.

=== Oakland Athletics (1972) ===
Horlen later signed with Oakland, and pitched mostly in relief as the Athletics won the 1972 World Series. During the regular season he pitched in 32 games, with a 3–4 record. He pitched 1.1 innings in relief in one World Series game, the only World Series appearance in his career, and was not involved in the decision. This would be the final major league game of his career.

He had been the losing pitcher in Game 4 of the 1972 American League Championship Series against the Detroit Tigers. He entered the game as a relief pitcher in the bottom of the 10th inning, with the A's leading 3–1. The Tigers had runners on first and second base. Horlen threw a wild pitch and then gave up a base on balls to Gates Brown loading the bases. The next batter hit a ground ball that could have been a double play, but the A's had inexperienced Gene Tenace at second base who mishandled the throw from third baseman Sal Bando allowing a run to score, and leading to Horlen's removal from the game. Horlen's replacement was ineffective and Brown eventually scored the winning run for the Tigers, placing the loss on Horlen.

== Honors ==
In 1993, he was inducted into the Oklahoma State University Cowboys Baseball Hall of Fame. In 2004, he was inducted into the San Antonio Sports Hall of Fame. In 2017, he was inducted into the San Antonio Independent School District Athletic Hall of Fame in 2017.

== Post-major league career ==
In 1973 he pitched for the Double-A San Antonio Brewers, going 6–1 with a 2.87 ERA. In 1989, Horlen played for the St. Lucie Legends of the Senior Professional Baseball Association.

== Personal life and death ==
In 1981, Horlen converted to Judaism when he married Lois Eisenstein.

In 2017, it was announced that he had Alzheimer's disease. He died on April 10, 2022, at the age of 84.

== See also ==
- List of Major League Baseball annual ERA leaders
- List of Major League Baseball no-hitters

Preceded by Dean Chance	No-hitter pitcher September 10, 1967	Succeeded by Tom Phoebus
