= 1968 Cleveland Indians season =

1968 Cleveland Indians
- League: American League
- Ballpark: Cleveland Municipal Stadium
- City: Cleveland, Ohio
- Owners: Vernon Stouffer
- General managers: Gabe Paul
- Managers: Alvin Dark
- Television: WJW-TV
- Radio: WERE (1300)

The 1968 Cleveland Indians season was their 68th season of baseball in the American League. It saw their pitching staff lead the major leagues with the most strikeouts (1,157) while allowing the fewest hits (1,087). Despite this, they finished 3rd in the American League, their highest finish in nine years. They would not finish higher than 4th again until 1994.

== Off season ==
- October 17, 1967: Jim King was released by the Indians.
- October 26, 1967: Marv Staehle was sent to the Indians by the Chicago White Sox to complete an earlier deal (the White Sox sent Jim King and a player to be named later to the Indians for Rocky Colavito) made on July 29, 1967.
- November 28, 1967: Darrell Sutherland was drafted by the Indians from the New York Mets in the 1967 minor league draft.
- November 28, 1967: Eddie Fisher was traded by the Baltimore Orioles with Bob Scott (minors) and John Scruggs (minors) to the Cleveland Indians for Gordy Lund and John O'Donoghue.
- January 27, 1968: Rick Sawyer was drafted by the Indians in the 3rd round of the 1968 Major League Baseball draft Secondary Phase.

== Regular season ==
=== Transactions ===
- June 7, 1968: Vince Colbert was drafted by the Cleveland Indians in the 11th round of the 1968 amateur draft.

=== Season standings ===
American League
Team	W	L	Pct.	GB	Home	Road
Detroit Tigers	103	59	.636	—	56‍–‍25	47‍–‍34
Baltimore Orioles	91	71	.562	12	47‍–‍33	44‍–‍38
Cleveland Indians	86	75	.534	16½	43‍–‍37	43‍–‍38
Boston Red Sox	86	76	.531	17	46‍–‍35	40‍–‍41
New York Yankees	83	79	.512	20	39‍–‍42	44‍–‍37
Oakland Athletics	82	80	.506	21	44‍–‍38	38‍–‍42
Minnesota Twins	79	83	.488	24	41‍–‍40	38‍–‍43
California Angels	67	95	.414	36	32‍–‍49	35‍–‍46
Chicago White Sox	67	95	.414	36	36‍–‍45	31‍–‍50
Washington Senators	65	96	.404	37½	34‍–‍47	31‍–‍49

=== Record vs. opponents ===
1968 American League record Sources:
Team	BAL	BOS	CAL	CWS	CLE	DET	MIN	NYY	OAK	WAS
Baltimore	—	9–9	10–8	11–7	7–11	8–10	10–8	13–5	9–9	14–4
Boston	9–9	—	9–9	14–4	10–8	6–12	9–9	10–8	8–10	11–7
California	8–10	9–9	—	8–10	7–11	5–13	7–11	6–12	5–13	12–6
Chicago	7–11	4–14	10–8	—	5–13	5–13	10–8	6–12	10–8	10–8
Cleveland	11–7	8–10	11–7	13–5	—	6–12	14–4	10–8–1	6–12	7–10
Detroit	10–8	12–6	13–5	13–5	12–6	—	10–8	10–8–1	13–5–1	10–8
Minnesota	8–10	9–9	11–7	8–10	4–14	8–10	—	12–6	8–10	11–7
New York	5–13	8–10	12–6	12–6	8–10–1	8–10–1	6–12	—	10–8	14–4
Oakland	9–9	10–8	13–5	8–10	12–6	5–13–1	10–8	8–10	—	7–11
Washington	4–14	7–11	6–12	8–10	10–7	8–10	7–11	4–14	11–7	—

=== Opening Day Lineup ===
Opening Day Starters
#	Name	Position
21	Tommy Harper	LF
13	Vern Fuller	2B
1	José Cardenal	CF
9	Duke Sims	C
11	Tony Horton	1B
25	Vic Davalillo	RF
10	Max Alvis	3B
16	Larry Brown	SS
42	Sonny Siebert	P

=== Roster ===
1968 Cleveland Indians
Roster
Pitchers: 37 Steve Bailey; 32 Eddie Fisher; 38 Rob Gardner; 44 Tommy Gramly; 34 Steve Hargan; 36 Mike Hedlund; 46 Hal Kurtz; 48 Sam McDowell; 39 Mike Paul; 31 Horacio Piña; 38 Billy Rohr; 43 Vicente Romo; 42 Sonny Siebert; 40 Darrell Sutherland; 33 Luis Tiant; 35 Stan Williams	Catchers: 7 Joe Azcue; 8 Ray Fosse; 9 Duke Sims; 7 Ken Suarez; Infielders: 10 Max Alvis; 16 Larry Brown; 13 Vern Fuller; 15 Billy Harris; 11 Tony Horton; 24 Lou Klimchock; 24 Eddie Leon; 14 Dave Nelson; 17 Chico Salmon; 22 Willie Smith	Outfielders: 1 José Cardenal; 25 Vic Davalillo; 20 Jimmie Hall; 21 Tommy Harper; 22 Lou Johnson; 26 Lee Maye; 23 Lou Piniella; 28 Richie Scheinblum; 27 Russ Snyder; 29 José Vidal; 27 Leon Wagner; Other batters: 25 Russ Nagelson	Manager: 5 Alvin Dark; Coaches: 4 Johnny Lipon (First Base); 2 Jack Sanford (Pitching); 3 George Strickland (Third Base)

== Player stats ==
=== Batting ===
==== Starters by position ====
Note: Pos = Position; G = Games played; AB = At bats; H = Hits; Avg. = Batting average; HR = Home runs; RBI = Runs batted in

Pos	Player	G	AB	H	Avg.	HR	RBI
C	Joe Azcue	115	357	100	.280	4	42
1B	Tony Horton	133	477	119	.249	14	59
2B	Vern Fuller	97	244	59	.242	0	18
SS	Larry Brown	154	495	116	.234	6	35
3B	Max Alvis	131	452	101	.223	8	37
LF	Lee Maye	109	299	84	.281	4	26
CF	José Cardenal	157	583	150	.257	7	44
RF	Vic Davalillo	51	180	43	.239	2	13

==== Other batters ====
Note: G = Games played; AB = At bats; H = Hits; Avg. = Batting average; HR = Home runs; RBI = Runs batted in

Player	G	AB	H	Avg.	HR	RBI
Duke Sims	122	361	90	.249	11	44
Chico Salmon	103	276	59	.214	3	12
Tommy Harper	130	235	51	.217	6	26
Russ Snyder	68	217	61	.281	2	23
Lou Johnson	65	202	52	.257	5	23
Dave Nelson	88	189	44	.233	0	19
Jimmie Hall	53	111	22	.198	1	8
Billy Harris	38	94	20	.213	0	3
Richie Scheinblum	19	55	12	.218	0	5
José Vidal	37	54	9	.167	2	5
Leon Wagner	38	49	9	.184	0	6
Willie Smith	33	42	6	.143	0	3
Lou Klimchock	11	15	2	.133	0	3
Ken Suarez	17	10	1	.100	0	0
Lou Piniella	6	5	0	.000	0	1
Russ Nagelson	5	3	1	.333	0	0
Eddie Leon	6	1	0	.000	0	0
Ray Fosse	1	0	0	----	0	0

=== Pitching ===
==== Starting pitchers ====
Note: G = Games pitched; IP = Innings pitched; W = Wins; L = Losses; ERA = Earned run average; SO = Strikeouts

Player	G	IP	W	L	ERA	SO
Sam McDowell	38	269.0	15	14	1.81	283
Luis Tiant	34	258.1	21	9	1.60	264
Sonny Siebert	31	206.0	12	10	2.97	146
Steve Hargan	32	158.1	8	15	4.15	78

==== Other pitchers ====
Note: G = Games pitched; IP = Innings pitched; W = Wins; L = Losses; ERA = Earned run average; SO = Strikeouts

Player	G	IP	W	L	ERA	SO
Stan Williams	44	194.1	13	11	2.50	147
Mike Paul	36	91.2	5	8	3.93	87
Horacio Piña	12	31.1	1	1	1.72	24
Steve Bailey	2	5.0	0	1	3.60	1

==== Relief pitchers ====
Note: G = Games pitched; W = Wins; L = Losses; SV = Saves; ERA = Earned run average; SO = Strikeouts

Player	G	W	L	SV	ERA	SO
Vicente Romo	40	5	3	12	1.62	54
Eddie Fisher	54	4	2	4	2.85	42
Hal Kurtz	28	1	0	1	5.21	16
Billy Rohr	17	1	0	1	6.87	5
Rob Gardner	5	0	0	0	6.75	6
Darrell Sutherland	3	0	0	0	8.10	2
Tommy Gramly	3	0	1	0	2.70	1
Mike Hedlund	3	0	0	0	10.80	0
Willie Smith	2	0	0	0	0.00	1

== Awards and honors ==
All-Star Game

== Farm system ==
Level	Team	League	Manager
AAA	Portland Beavers	Pacific Coast League	Red Davis
AA	Waterbury Indians	Eastern League	Phil Cavarretta and Ray Mueller
A	Reno Silver Sox	California League	Clay Bryant
A	Rock Hill Indians	Western Carolinas League	Pinky May
Rookie	GCL Indians	Gulf Coast League	Ken Aspromonte
