= 1968 Baltimore Orioles season =

Major League Baseball season

1968 Baltimore Orioles
- League: American League
- Ballpark: Memorial Stadium
- City: Baltimore, Maryland
- Record: 91–71 (.562)
- League place: 2nd
- Owners: Jerold Hoffberger
- General managers: Harry Dalton
- Managers: Hank Bauer, Earl Weaver
- Television: WJZ-TV
- Radio: WBAL (AM) (Chuck Thompson, Bill O'Donnell)

The 1968 Baltimore Orioles season was a season in American baseball. The team finished second in the American League with a record of 91 wins and 71 losses, 12 games behind the AL and World Series champion Detroit Tigers. The team was managed for the first 80 games by Hank Bauer (who won 43 of them) and he was replaced right after the All-Star break by Earl Weaver. The Orioles' home games were played at Memorial Stadium.

Following the season, it was announced that the American League, along with the National League, would be split into two divisions for the 1969 season in order to accommodate the admittance of two new franchises to each league. The Orioles were assigned to the new American League East division.

== Offseason ==
- November 28, 1967: Elrod Hendricks was drafted by the Orioles from the California Angels in the 1967 rule 5 draft.
- November 28, 1967: Eddie Fisher was traded by the Baltimore Orioles with Bob Scott (minors) and John Scruggs (minors) to the Cleveland Indians for Gordy Lund and John O'Donoghue.
- November 29, 1967: Luis Aparicio, Russ Snyder and John Matias were traded by the Orioles to the Chicago White Sox for Don Buford, Roger Nelson and Bruce Howard.
- January 27, 1968: Tom Walker was drafted by the Orioles in the 1st round (9th pick) of the 1968 Major League Baseball draft.

== Regular season ==
On April 27, 1968, Tom Phoebus would throw a no-hitter versus the Boston Red Sox. Frank Robinson would contribute with three RBIs in the win.

=== Season standings ===
American League
Team	W	L	Pct.	GB	Home	Road
Detroit Tigers	103	59	.636	—	56‍–‍25	47‍–‍34
Baltimore Orioles	91	71	.562	12	47‍–‍33	44‍–‍38
Cleveland Indians	86	75	.534	16½	43‍–‍37	43‍–‍38
Boston Red Sox	86	76	.531	17	46‍–‍35	40‍–‍41
New York Yankees	83	79	.512	20	39‍–‍42	44‍–‍37
Oakland Athletics	82	80	.506	21	44‍–‍38	38‍–‍42
Minnesota Twins	79	83	.488	24	41‍–‍40	38‍–‍43
California Angels	67	95	.414	36	32‍–‍49	35‍–‍46
Chicago White Sox	67	95	.414	36	36‍–‍45	31‍–‍50
Washington Senators	65	96	.404	37½	34‍–‍47	31‍–‍49

=== Record vs. opponents ===
1968 American League record Sources:
Team	BAL	BOS	CAL	CWS	CLE	DET	MIN	NYY	OAK	WAS
Baltimore	—	9–9	10–8	11–7	7–11	8–10	10–8	13–5	9–9	14–4
Boston	9–9	—	9–9	14–4	10–8	6–12	9–9	10–8	8–10	11–7
California	8–10	9–9	—	8–10	7–11	5–13	7–11	6–12	5–13	12–6
Chicago	7–11	4–14	10–8	—	5–13	5–13	10–8	6–12	10–8	10–8
Cleveland	11–7	8–10	11–7	13–5	—	6–12	14–4	10–8–1	6–12	7–10
Detroit	10–8	12–6	13–5	13–5	12–6	—	10–8	10–8–1	13–5–1	10–8
Minnesota	8–10	9–9	11–7	8–10	4–14	8–10	—	12–6	8–10	11–7
New York	5–13	8–10	12–6	12–6	8–10–1	8–10–1	6–12	—	10–8	14–4
Oakland	9–9	10–8	13–5	8–10	12–6	5–13–1	10–8	8–10	—	7–11
Washington	4–14	7–11	6–12	8–10	10–7	8–10	7–11	4–14	11–7	—

=== Notable transactions ===
- June 15, 1968: Bruce Howard was traded by the Orioles to the Washington Senators for Fred Valentine.

=== Roster ===
1968 Baltimore Orioles
Roster
Pitchers: 17 Mike Adamson; 50 Fred Beene; 32 Gene Brabender; 27 Wally Bunker; 25 Moe Drabowsky; 44 Jim Hardin; 16 Bruce Howard; 40 Dave Leonhard; 19 Dave McNally; 37 John Morris; 35 Roger Nelson; 28 John O'Donoghue; 36 Tom Phoebus; 24 Pete Richert; 39 Eddie Watt	Catchers: 8 Andy Etchebarren; 34 Larry Haney; 10 Elrod Hendricks; Infielders: 7 Mark Belanger; 1,59 Chico Fernández; 30 Mike Fiore; 2 Bobby Floyd; 15 Davey Johnson; 26 Boog Powell; 5 Brooks Robinson	Outfielders: 6 Paul Blair; 3 Curt Blefary; 9 Don Buford; 12 Dave May; 21 Curt Motton; 14,47 Merv Rettenmund; 20 Frank Robinson; 16 Fred Valentine	Manager: 42 Hank Bauer; 4 Earl Weaver; Coaches: 31 George Bamberger; 41 Vern Hoscheit; 55 Billy Hunter; 48 Ray Scarborough; 48 George Staller; 4 Earl Weaver

== Player stats ==
=== Batting ===
==== Starters by position ====
Note: Pos = Position; G = Games played; AB = At bats; H = Hits; Avg. = Batting average; HR = Home runs; RBI = Runs batted in

Pos	Player	G	AB	H	Avg.	HR	RBI
C	Andy Etchebarren	74	189	44	.233	5	20
1B	Boog Powell	154	550	137	.249	22	85
2B	Davey Johnson	145	504	122	.242	9	56
3B	Brooks Robinson	162	608	154	.253	17	75
SS	Mark Belanger	145	472	98	.208	2	21
LF	Curt Motton	83	217	43	.198	8	25
CF	Paul Blair	141	421	89	.211	7	38
RF	Frank Robinson	130	421	113	.268	15	52

==== Other batters ====
Note: G = Games played; AB = At bats; H = Hits; Avg. = Batting average; HR = Home runs; RBI = Runs batted in

Player	G	AB	H	Avg.	HR	RBI
Curt Blefary	137	451	90	.200	15	39
Don Buford	130	426	120	.282	15	46
Elrod Hendricks	79	183	37	.202	7	23
Dave May	84	152	29	.191	0	7
Fred Valentine	47	91	17	.187	2	5
Larry Haney	38	89	21	.236	1	5
Merv Rettenmund	31	64	19	.297	2	7
Chico Fernández	24	18	2	.111	0	0
Mike Fiore	6	17	1	.059	0	0
Bobby Floyd	5	9	1	.111	0	1

=== Pitching ===
==== Starting pitchers ====
Note: G = Games pitched; IP = Innings pitched; W = Wins; L = Losses; ERA = Earned run average; SO = Strikeouts

Player	G	IP	W	L	ERA	SO
Dave McNally	35	273.0	22	10	1.95	202
Jim Hardin	35	244.0	18	13	2.51	160
Tom Phoebus	36	240.2	15	15	2.62	193
Mike Adamson	2	7.2	0	2	9.39	4

==== Other pitchers ====
Note: G = Games pitched; IP = Innings pitched; W = Wins; L = Losses; ERA = Earned run average; SO = Strikeouts

Player	G	IP	W	L	ERA	SO
Dave Leonhard	28	126.1	7	7	3.13	61
Gene Brabender	37	124.2	6	7	3.32	92
Wally Bunker	18	71.0	2	0	2.41	44
Roger Nelson	19	71.0	4	3	2.41	70
Bruce Howard	10	31.0	0	2	3.77	19

==== Relief pitchers ====
Note: G = Games pitched; W = Wins; L = Losses; SV = Saves; ERA = Earned run average; SO = Strikeouts

Player	G	W	L	SV	ERA	SO
Eddie Watt	59	5	5	11	2.27	72
Moe Drabowsky	45	4	4	7	1.91	46
Pete Richert	36	6	3	6	3.47	47
John Morris	19	2	0	0	2.56	22
John O'Donoghue	16	0	0	2	6.14	11
Fred Beene	1	0	0	0	9.00	1

== Farm system ==
Level	Team	League	Manager
AAA	Rochester Red Wings	International League	Billy DeMars
AA	Elmira Pioneers	Eastern League	Cal Ripken Sr.
A	Stockton Ports	California League	Joe Altobelli
A	Miami Marlins	Florida State League	Harry Malmberg
A-Short Season	Aberdeen Pheasants	Northern League	Bill Werle
Rookie	Bluefield Orioles	Appalachian League	Ken Rowe
