= 1968 Washington Senators season =

1968 Washington Senators
- League: American League
- Ballpark: D.C. Stadium
- City: Washington, D.C.
- Record: 65–96 (.404)
- League place: 10th
- Owners: James H. Lemon
- General managers: George Selkirk
- Managers: Jim Lemon
- Television: WTOP
- Radio: WTOP (Dan Daniels, John MacLean)

The 1968 Washington Senators season was the eighth in the expansion team's history, and it saw the Senators finish tenth and last in the ten-team American League with a record of 65 wins and 96 losses. The club also finished 20th and last in MLB attendance, with a total of 564,661 fans, a decrease of about 206,000 from 1967. Civil unrest in Washington, D.C., resulting from the April 4 assassination of Martin Luther King Jr., caused a two-day postponement of the traditional Presidential opener, which had been scheduled for D.C. Stadium on April 8.

The Senators' struggles on the field and at the turnstiles helped drive owner James H. Lemon to put the team on the market. On December 3, 1968, it was announced that Minneapolis businessman and politician Bob Short had outbid entertainer Bob Hope to purchase the Washington franchise. Short had earlier owned a professional sports team when he purchased the Minneapolis Lakers of the NBA in 1957, moved them to Los Angeles in 1960, and sold the reborn Los Angeles Lakers to Jack Kent Cooke in 1964.

In a front-office housecleaning, Short ousted general manager George Selkirk and took responsibility for the club's baseball operations himself. He then made headlines by replacing 1968's first-year manager Jim Lemon (no relation to the former owner) with Baseball Hall of Fame hitter Ted Williams, whom he lured back into uniform to become the club's new pilot. Williams' signing was announced just prior to spring training on February 21, 1969.

== Offseason ==
- February 13, 1968: Tim Cullen, Buster Narum and Bob Priddy were traded by the Senators to the Chicago White Sox for Dennis Higgins, Steve Jones, and Ron Hansen.

== Regular season ==
- July 30, 1968, Ron Hansen of the Senators turned an unassisted triple play. He caught a line drive, touched second base and tagged the runner coming from first base.

=== Opening Day starters ===
- Paul Casanova
- Frank Coggins
- Mike Epstein
- Ron Hansen
- Frank Howard
- Ken McMullen
- Camilo Pascual
- Del Unser
- Fred Valentine

=== Season standings ===
American League
Team	W	L	Pct.	GB	Home	Road
Detroit Tigers	103	59	.636	—	56‍–‍25	47‍–‍34
Baltimore Orioles	91	71	.562	12	47‍–‍33	44‍–‍38
Cleveland Indians	86	75	.534	16½	43‍–‍37	43‍–‍38
Boston Red Sox	86	76	.531	17	46‍–‍35	40‍–‍41
New York Yankees	83	79	.512	20	39‍–‍42	44‍–‍37
Oakland Athletics	82	80	.506	21	44‍–‍38	38‍–‍42
Minnesota Twins	79	83	.488	24	41‍–‍40	38‍–‍43
California Angels	67	95	.414	36	32‍–‍49	35‍–‍46
Chicago White Sox	67	95	.414	36	36‍–‍45	31‍–‍50
Washington Senators	65	96	.404	37½	34‍–‍47	31‍–‍49

=== Record vs. opponents ===
1968 American League record Sources:
Team	BAL	BOS	CAL	CWS	CLE	DET	MIN	NYY	OAK	WAS
Baltimore	—	9–9	10–8	11–7	7–11	8–10	10–8	13–5	9–9	14–4
Boston	9–9	—	9–9	14–4	10–8	6–12	9–9	10–8	8–10	11–7
California	8–10	9–9	—	8–10	7–11	5–13	7–11	6–12	5–13	12–6
Chicago	7–11	4–14	10–8	—	5–13	5–13	10–8	6–12	10–8	10–8
Cleveland	11–7	8–10	11–7	13–5	—	6–12	14–4	10–8–1	6–12	7–10
Detroit	10–8	12–6	13–5	13–5	12–6	—	10–8	10–8–1	13–5–1	10–8
Minnesota	8–10	9–9	11–7	8–10	4–14	8–10	—	12–6	8–10	11–7
New York	5–13	8–10	12–6	12–6	8–10–1	8–10–1	6–12	—	10–8	14–4
Oakland	9–9	10–8	13–5	8–10	12–6	5–13–1	10–8	8–10	—	7–11
Washington	4–14	7–11	6–12	8–10	10–7	8–10	7–11	4–14	11–7	—

=== Notable transactions ===
- June 7, 1968: 1968 Major League Baseball draft
  - Don Castle was drafted by the Senators in the 1st round.
  - Jim Mason was drafted by the Senators in the 2nd round.
  - Mike Cubbage was drafted by the Senators in the 6th round, but did not sign.
- August 2, 1968: Ron Hansen was traded by the Senators to the Chicago White Sox for Tim Cullen.

=== Roster ===
1968 Washington Senators
Roster
Pitchers: 37 Dave Baldwin; 24 Frank Bertaina; 27 Dick Bosman; 20 Joe Coleman; 29 Casey Cox; 22 Bill Denehy; 16 Jim Hannan; 21 Bill Haywood; 28 Dennis Higgins; 18 Bruce Howard; 23 Bob Humphreys; 34 Steve Jones; 32 Darold Knowles; 31 Jim Miles; 25 Barry Moore; 26 Phil Ortega; 17 Camilo Pascual; 19 Gerry Schoen	Catchers: 14 Billy Bryan; 8 Paul Casanova; 10 Jim French; Infielders: 7 Bernie Allen; 11 Ed Brinkman; 1,32 Frank Coggins; 1 Tim Cullen; 12 Mike Epstein; 6 Ron Hansen; 5 Gary Holman; 2 Ken McMullen	Outfielders: 5,35 Hank Allen; 3 Brant Alyea; 6 Dick Billings; 35 Sam Bowens; 9 Frank Howard; 22 Gene Martin; 4 Cap Peterson; 36 Ed Stroud; 30 Del Unser; 34 Fred Valentine	Manager: 40 Jim Lemon; Coaches: 44 Doug Camilli; 42 Nellie Fox; 43 Bobby Hofman; 41 Sid Hudson

== Player stats ==
= Indicates team leader

= Indicates league leader

=== Batting ===
==== Starters by position ====
Note: Pos = Position; G = Games played; AB = At bats; H = Hits; Avg. = Batting average; HR = Home runs; RBI = Runs batted in

Pos	Player	G	AB	H	Avg.	HR	RBI
C	Paul Casanova	96	322	63	.196	4	25
1B	Mike Epstein	123	385	90	.234	13	33
2B	Bernie Allen	120	373	90	.241	6	40
SS	Ron Hansen	86	275	51	.185	8	28
3B	Ken McMullen	151	557	138	.248	20	62
LF	Frank Howard	158	598	164	.274	44	106
CF	Del Unser	156	635	146	.230	1	30
RF	Ed Stroud	105	306	73	.239	4	23

==== Other batters ====
Note: G = Games played; AB = At bats; H = Hits; Avg. = Batting average; HR = Home runs; RBI = Runs batted in

Player	G	AB	H	Avg.	HR	RBI
Cap Peterson	94	226	46	.204	3	18
Ed Brinkman	77	193	36	.187	0	6
Frank Coggins	62	171	30	.175	0	7
Jim French	59	165	32	.194	1	10
Brant Alyea	53	150	40	.267	6	23
Hank Allen	68	128	28	.219	1	9
Sam Bowens	57	115	22	.191	4	7
Tim Cullen	47	114	31	.272	1	16
Billy Bryan	40	108	22	.204	3	8
Fred Valentine	37	101	24	.238	3	7
Gary Holman	75	85	25	.294	0	7
Dick Billings	12	33	6	.182	1	3
Gene Martin	9	11	4	.364	1	1

=== Pitching ===
==== Starting pitchers ====
Note: G = Games pitched; IP = Innings pitched; W = Wins; L = Losses; ERA = Earned run average; SO = Strikeouts

Player	G	IP	W	L	ERA	SO
Joe Coleman	33	223.0	12	16	3.27	139
Camilo Pascual	31	201.0	13	12	2.69	111
Jim Hannan	25	140.1	10	6	3.01	75
Frank Bertaina	27	127.1	7	13	4.66	81
Gerry Schoen	1	3.2	0	1	7.36	1

==== Other pitchers ====
Note: G = Games pitched; IP = Innings pitched; W = Wins; L = Losses; ERA = Earned run average; SO = Strikeouts

Player	G	IP	W	L	ERA	SO
Dick Bosman	46	139.0	2	9	3.69	63
Barry Moore	32	117.2	4	6	3.37	56
Phil Ortega	31	115.2	5	12	4.98	57
Bruce Howard	13	48.2	1	4	5.86	23

==== Relief pitchers ====
Note: G = Games pitched; W = Wins; L = Losses; SV = Saves; ERA = Earned run average; SO = Strikeouts

Player	G	W	L	SV	ERA	SO
Dennis Higgins	59	4	4	13	3.25	66
Bob Humphreys	56	5	7	2	3.69	56
Dave Baldwin	40	0	2	5	4.07	30
Darold Knowles	32	1	1	4	2.18	37
Bill Haywood	14	0	0	0	4.70	10
Steve Jones	7	1	2	0	5.91	11
Casey Cox	4	0	1	0	2.35	4
Jim Miles	3	0	0	0	12.46	5
Bill Denehy	3	0	0	0	9.00	1

== Awards and honors ==
=== League leaders ===
- Frank Howard, American League leader, Home runs

=== All-Stars ===
All-Star Game

== Farm system ==
Level	Team	League	Manager
AAA	Buffalo Bisons	International League	Wayne Terwilliger
AA	Savannah Senators	Southern League	Buddy Hicks
A	Burlington Senators	Carolina League	Len Johnston
A	Salisbury Senators	Western Carolinas League	Billy Klaus
A-Short Season	Geneva Senators	New York–Penn League	Joe Marchese
