= Don Buford =

American baseball player (born 1937)

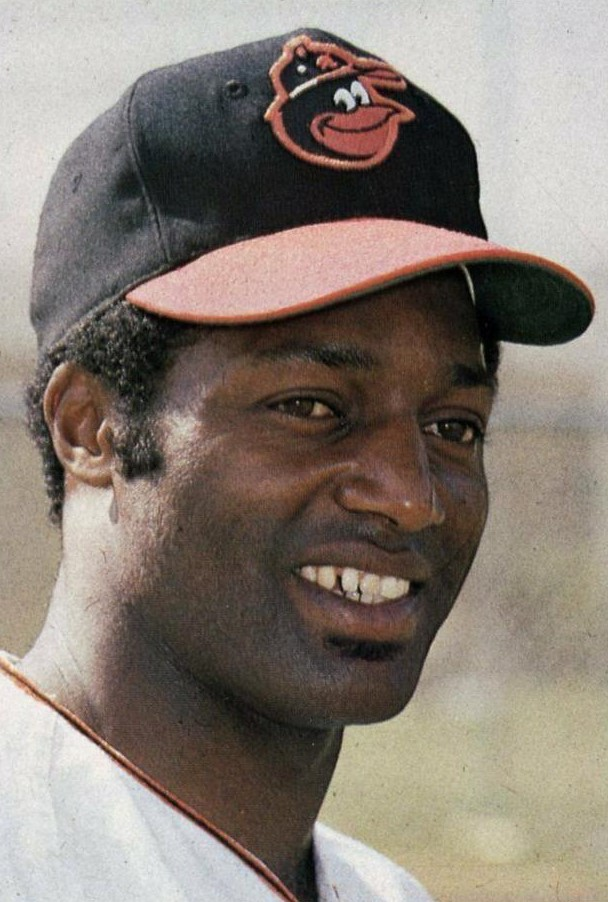
- Left fielder / Second baseman / Third baseman
- Born: February 2, 1937 (age 89); Linden, Texas, U.S.
- Batted: Switch Threw: Right

Professional debut
- MLB: September 14, 1963, for the Chicago White Sox
- NPB: April 14, 1973, for the Taiheiyo Club Lions

Last appearance
- MLB: October 3, 1972, for the Baltimore Orioles
- NPB: October 7, 1976, for the Nankai Hawks

MLB statistics
- Batting average: .264
- Home runs: 93
- Runs batted in: 418

NPB statistics
- Batting average: .270
- Home runs: 65
- Runs batted in: 213
- Stats at Baseball Reference

Teams
- Chicago White Sox (1963–1967); Baltimore Orioles (1968–1972); Taiheiyo Club Lions (1973–1975); Nankai Hawks (1976)

Career highlights and awards
- All-Star (1971); World Series champion (1970); Baltimore Orioles Hall of Fame

Donald Alvin Buford (born February 2, 1937) is an American former professional baseball player scout, coach and manager. He played in Major League Baseball as an outfielder from 1963 through 1972, most notably as the leadoff hitter for the Baltimore Orioles dynasty that won three consecutive American League pennants from 1969 to 1971 and won the 1970 World Series over the Cincinnati Reds. He also played for the Chicago White Sox and played in the Nippon Professional Baseball league from 1973 to 1976. Buford also played as an infielder and was a switch hitter who threw right-handed. In 1993, Buford was inducted into the Baltimore Orioles Hall of Fame.

== Early life ==
Buford was born on February 2, 1937, in Linden, Texas. His father was killed in a shooting accident when he was a young child. His mother, Sedalia Buford, then moved the family to Southern California to be closer to her family. He was a football and baseball star at Susan Miller Dorsey High School in Los Angeles, graduating in 1955.

== College career ==
At 5 ft 7 in (1.70 m) and 160 pounds (72.6 kg), he was not heavily recruited by colleges because of his size. He attended three semesters at Los Angeles City College, where he won All-Conference honors at quarterback in 1955 and at halfback in 1956. He received honorable mention as a Junior College All-American. He transferred to the University of Southern California (USC) in the city, on a football scholarship, because he was able to play baseball in addition to football there.

He began his college baseball career for the USC Trojans baseball team under legendary coach Rod Dedeaux, whose teams would win 10 College World Series. Buford became a regular in the 1958 and 1959 seasons. He played outfield and had a .323 batting average in 1958, on a Trojans team that won the College World Series, Dedeaux's first. Buford continued to play football at USC, as both a defensive and offensive halfback in 1957 and 1958. He led the team in kickoff returns both years, and in 1958, he led the team in interceptions, punt returns, and rushing yardage as well. In a stellar 1958 performance against Notre Dame, he rushed for 34 yards, threw a touchdown pass, returned kicks and punts, and had two interceptions. He was named All-Pacific Coast that year. He played halfback for the national all-stars in the Copper Bowl. In May 1959, he received USC's Jacob Gimbel Athletic Attitude Award, given to a senior athlete for best attitude.

Dedeaux hired Buford as an assistant from 1985 to 1987. In 2001, he was inducted into the USC Athletics Hall of Fame for baseball.

Buford's sons Don Buford, Jr. (who played in the Orioles minor league system, before becoming an orthopedic surgeon) and Damon Buford (who played 2½ years for the Orioles) also played for the USC Trojans. A third son, Daryl, went to USC's Gould School of Law and became an attorney. Buford's wife, Alescia (Jackson) Buford graduated from USC rival UCLA with a law degree. Buford is a member of Kappa Alpha Psi fraternity.

== Professional playing career ==
=== Minor league career ===
In 1960, Buford began his professional career with the San Diego Padres of the Triple-A Pacific Coast League. After two weeks he was sent to the Triple-I League for the rest of the year, suffering a knee injury that never fully healed and required three future surgeries. In 1961 and 1962, he played chiefly in the Sally League and Florida Instructional League. In 1963, he joined Indianapolis of the Triple A International League where he finally proved himself worthy of the major leagues. He led the league with a .336 average, was named Most Valuable Player and Rookie of the Year, and named The Sporting News minor league Player of the Year, all while helping his team to a championship. The White Sox called him up to the major league (American League) on September 14, 1963 for 12 games, and he hit .286.

=== Chicago White Sox ===
A rookie at age 27 in 1964, Buford broke into the majors as an infielder. He had played third base his last year in the minor leagues, but was behind Pete Ward (the 1963 Sporting News Rookie of the year) at third base in Chicago, so the team planned to move him to second base. This proved a difficult transition, and he would be moved to third base whenever Ward rested. In 1966, manager Eddie Stanky moved Ward to the outfield, and Buford went to third, but he led the league with 26 errors. He had become a regular second baseman in 1965, playing 139 total games, after sharing the position in 1964 with Al Weis who played 116 games.

As a rookie he hit .262, and in 1965 he hit .283, had 67 walks, and scored 93 runs to go along with 10 home runs, while hitting second in the White Sox batting order. In 1966, he stole a career-high 51 bases (one fewer than the American League leader, Bert Campaneris) scored 85 runs, and led the AL in sacrifice hits with 17, though his average fell to .244, while establishing himself as one of the league's top leadoff hitters.

In 1967, Buford and Ken Berry tied for the team lead with a .241 batting average on a White Sox team that battled the Boston Red Sox, Detroit Tigers and Minnesota Twins for the American League pennant, which the Red Sox won on the final day of the regular season. The White Sox were eliminated from pennant contention (perhaps due, in large part, to faulty offense; they led the majors with a 2.45 earned run average, but batted only .225) the final week of the season after losing a doubleheader to the lowly Kansas City Athletics on September 27.

=== Baltimore Orioles ===
Buford was traded along with Bruce Howard and Roger Nelson to the Baltimore Orioles for Luis Aparicio, Russ Snyder and John Matias on November 29, 1967. In 1968 he batted .282 with 15 home runs in a lineup that also featured the likes of Frank Robinson, Brooks Robinson, Boog Powell, Davey Johnson and Paul Blair. In 1968, Oriole manage Hank Bauer used Buford as a backup at second base for Davey Johnson, or a starter when Johnson played shortstop. First base coach, and future hall of fame manager, Earl Weaver loved Buford's playing style and knew Buford had been a star outfielder in the minor leagues before being moved to the infield. When Weaver replaced Bauer in mid-1968, he immediately put Buford in the starting lineup as his leadoff hitter (Buford hitting a home run in his first game under Weaver); and moved Buford to the outfield. After hitting a meager .234 under Bauer, in the final 82 games under Weaver, Buford had a .298 batting average, with 11 home runs, 45 walks and 45 runs.

In 1969, Buford hit a career-high .291 as the Orioles won the American League pennant. In the first game of the World Series against the New York Mets, Buford hit a leadoff home run against fellow ex-USC Trojan Tom Seaver—the first home run to lead off a World Series. (Dustin Pedroia, Alcides Escobar, and Jorge Soler, are the only other players to lead off a World Series with a home run, for the Boston Red Sox in 2007, the Kansas City Royals in 2015, and the Houston Astros in 2021 respectively.) Buford also drove in another run with a double as the Orioles won 4-1. However, he went 0-for-16 over the next four games, all won by the Mets for a seemingly impossible Series victory.

In 1970 Buford batted .272 with 17 home runs and a career high 109 walks. The Orioles gained redemption in the World Series, which they won over the Cincinnati Reds in five games. Buford, playing in four of those games, went 4-for-15, including a home run in Game Three, which Baltimore won 9-3. In 1971 Buford batted .290 with a career-high 19 home runs. He was also selected to the All-Star team for the only time in his career. Again the Orioles went to the World Series; this time, however, the Pittsburgh Pirates defeated them in seven games. Buford collected six hits in this Series; two of them were home runs.

In each of the Orioles’ three pennant-winning seasons Buford scored 99 runs, leading the American League in that category in 1971. He hit .318, with two home runs, five runs scored and four RBIs in the 1970 post-season against the Minnesota Twins and the Reds, and .300, with two home runs, four runs scored, and four RBIs in the 1971 post-season against the Oakland Athletics and Pirates. He did not commit any errors in the field in his 15 World Series games.

Buford was the first Baltimore Oriole to homer from both sides of the plate in the same game. He accomplished this feat on April 9, 1970 in a 13-1 win over the Cleveland Indians. Buford also had the dubious distinction of being the first Oriole to strike out five times in one game, on August 26, 1971. However, his Orioles defeated his former team, the Chicago White Sox, 8–7. He was fined by “Judge” Frank Robinson of the Orioles Kangaroo Court for his performance.

=== Japan ===
After the 1971 season the Orioles played an 18 game exhibition series in Japan. Buford hit home runs in consecutive games against the Yomiuri Giants, and in a game against the Hiroshima Carp he hit a two-run home run, scored another run and stole a pair of bases. He had 11 total RBIs. After slumping to .206 in 1972, the Orioles asked Buford to take a $10,000 pay cut, which he refused. His contract rights were sold to the Taiheiyo Club Lions in Japan, who doubled his salary. Buford returned to Japan, where he had been known as "The Greatest Leadoff Man in the World" during the Orioles’ tour, to play professionally. In four seasons (three with the Lions, where he made two All-Star teams - receiving honors - and his final season with the Nankai Hawks), from 1973 to 1976, he hit .270 with 65 home runs and 213 RBIs. In 1973 and 1974 he was voted to the top 9 Best Players in Japan. Former American baseball major leaguers Roger Repoz (1973), Matty Alou (1974-1975) and Frank Howard (1974) were Lions teammates.

== Legacy ==
In his major league career, Buford batted .264 with 93 home runs, 418 RBIs, 718 runs scored and 200 stolen bases in 1286 games played. Primarily a leadoff hitter, he grounded into only 34 double plays during his big-league career (4,553 at bats) and holds the Major League Record for the lowest GIDP rate, averaging one in every 138 at bats. Buford's career total is two fewer than Jim Rice's single-season record of 36, set in 1984, and 316 fewer than Cal Ripken's career record mark of 350 GIDPs.

Buford remains one of the most respected individuals to teach the game of baseball. His number 9 was retired by the Daytona Cubs after the 2006 season.

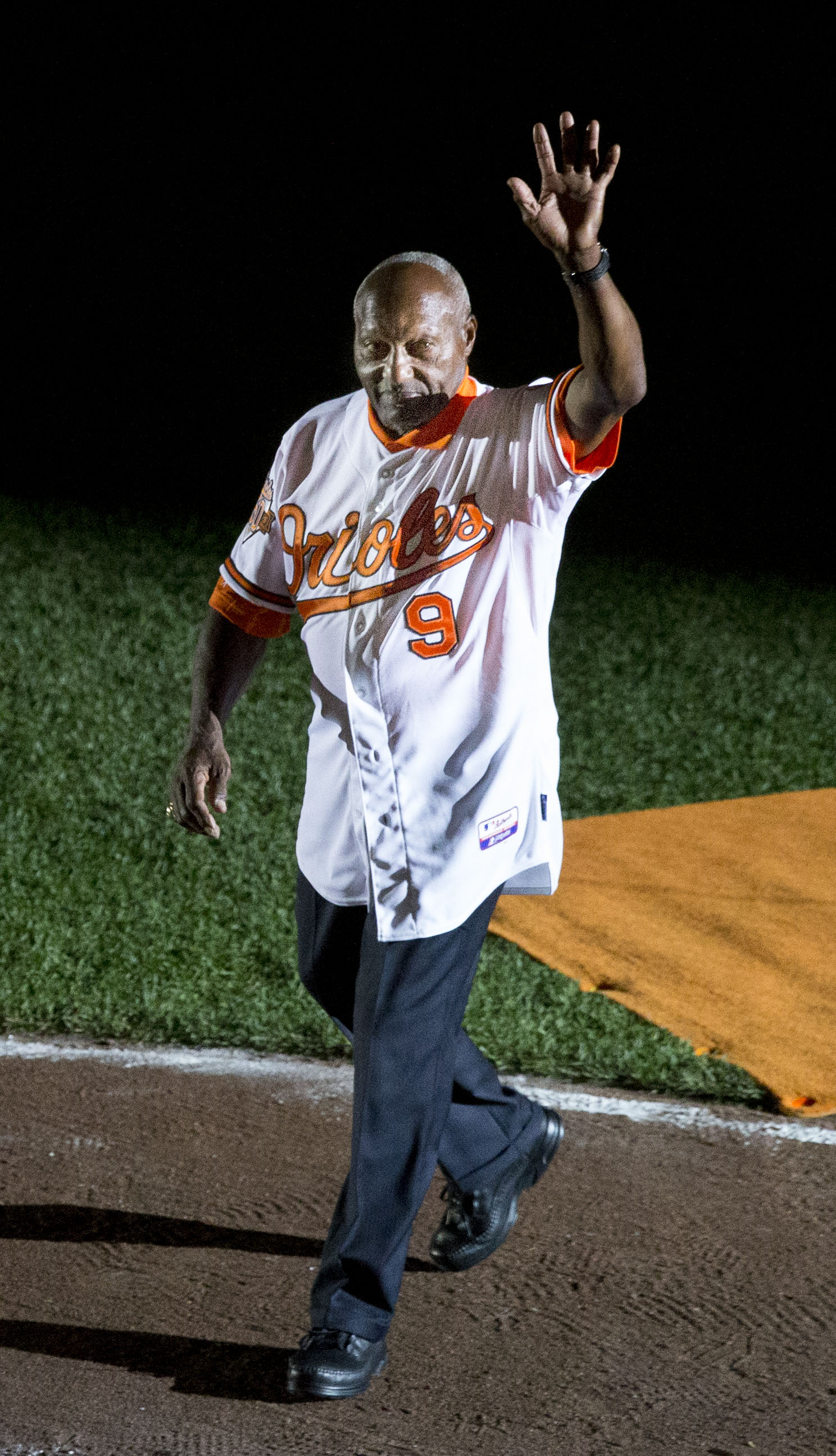
Buford in 2014

== Manager, coach and executive ==
In 2006, Buford was the manager of the Daytona Cubs of the Florida State League. He was hired as a coach by Frank Robinson in 1981, and continued to serve on Robinson's coaching staff with the Orioles, San Francisco Giants and Washington Nationals.

He had front office and other minor league positions with the Orioles. Buford managed the Rookie League Team (Bluefield). He managed the Orioles' Single-A team (Aberdeen IronBirds), High-A team (Frederick Keys), and Double-A team (Bowie Baysox). Buford was assistant director of player development for five years, and farm director, all for the Orioles.

== Personal life ==
After retiring from Japanese ball, he worked as a personnel manager for Sears Roebuck until 1981.

Buford's son Damon Buford also played in the major leagues, playing with the Orioles, Mets, Texas Rangers, Boston Red Sox and Chicago Cubs from 1993 to 2001. Buford’s oldest son Don Buford, Jr. also played professional baseball in the Baltimore Orioles organization for four years. He is now an internationally recognized orthopedic surgeon specializing in sports medicine and shoulder surgery.

In October of 2012, Don Buford, Sr. accepted a new position managing Major League Baseball's Urban Youth Academy in Compton, California. The academy focuses on baseball and softball training and education and is free to participants. He is now working on his own Community Organization, Educational Sports Institute, which is based in Watts.

== Honors ==
Buford has received the following awards and honors, among others:

- Inducted into the Baltimore Orioles Hall of Fame (1993)
- Inducted into the USC Athletic Hall of Fame (2001)
- Inducted into the International League Triple A Hall of Fame (2008)
- Most Valuable Player, International League (1963)
- Rookie of the Year, International League (1963)
- Sporting News minor league player of the year (1963)
- American League All-Star (1971)
- Nippon Professional Baseball All Star (1973-1974)

== See also ==
- List of Major League Baseball annual runs scored leaders

Sporting positions
Preceded by franchise created	Bowie Baysox Manager; 1993	Succeeded by Pete Mackanin
Preceded by Jerry Narron	Baltimore Orioles Bench Coach; 1994	Succeeded by Chuck Cottier
