= Tommy Gramly =

American baseball player (born 1945)

- Pitcher
- Born: April 19, 1945 (age 81); Dallas, Texas
- Batted: Right Threw: Right

MLB debut
- April 18, 1968, for the Cleveland Indians

Last MLB appearance
- May 21, 1968, for the Cleveland Indians

MLB statistics
- Win–loss record: 0–1
- Earned run average: 2.70
- Innings: 3⅓
- Stats at Baseball Reference

Teams
- Cleveland Indians (1968)

Bert Thomas Gramly (born April 19, 1945) is a former Major League Baseball pitcher who played for one season. He pitched three games for the Cleveland Indians during the 1968 season. Born in Dallas, Texas, he played baseball at South Oak Cliff High School. After graduating, he wanted to continue pursuing baseball, but not no scholarships offers, and as a result went to Angelo State Junior College. He played for them for two seasons, then was offered as scholarship by Texas Christian University (TCU), where he spent his junior year. With the team, he was an All-Southwest Conference selection as a unanimous choice.

After his junior year, Gramly was selected by the Cleveland Indians in the 1966 Major League Baseball draft, and chose to sign with the team. He began his professional career with the Triple-A Portland Beavers, where he had a 1–6 win-loss record and a 3.66 earned run average (ERA) in 15 games. He spent the full 1967 season with the Beavers, finishing the year with a 14–9 record and a 3.27 ERA in 33 games. Gramly spent spring training with the Indians, and as the season began, he was the final man added to the roster for the 1968 season. Gramly pitched in three games for the Indians totaling 3 1/3 innings before the Indians returned him to Portland, replacing him with fellow rookie Mike Paul. He spent the rest of the year with Portland, pitching in eight total games for the team.

In 1969, Gramly again spent the season with Portland, splitting time as a starting pitcher and relief pitcher. He finished the season with a 1−9 record and a 5.11 ERA in 31 games. During the offseason, Gramly attempted to become an outfielder in an attempt to return to the major leagues. This was ultimately unsuccessful, and he returned to TCU to finish his education, ending his professional baseball career.
