= Jim Lemon =

American baseball player (1928–2006)

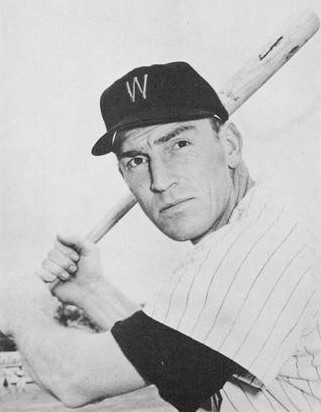
- Lemon in 1959
- Outfielder / Manager
- Born: March 23, 1928; Covington, Virginia, U.S.
- Died: May 14, 2006 (aged 78); Brandon, Mississippi, U.S.
- Batted: Right Threw: Right

MLB debut
- August 20, 1950, for the Cleveland Indians

Last MLB appearance
- September 24, 1963, for the Chicago White Sox

MLB statistics
- Batting average: .262
- Home runs: 164
- Runs batted in: 529
- Managerial record: 65–96
- Winning %: .404
- Stats at Baseball Reference
- Managerial record at Baseball Reference

Teams
- As player: Cleveland Indians (1950, 1953); Washington Senators / Minnesota Twins (1954–1963); Philadelphia Phillies (1963); Chicago White Sox (1963); As manager: Washington Senators (1968)

Career highlights and awards
- 2× All-Star (1960, 1960²)

James Robert Lemon (March 23, 1928 – May 14, 2006) was an American right and left fielder, manager and coach in Major League Baseball. The right-handed hitting and throwing Lemon teamed with fellow sluggers Roy Sievers and, later, with future baseball Hall of Fame home run champion Harmon Killebrew and Bob Allison to form the most formidable homer-hitting tandems in the sixty-year history of the original 20th century Washington Senators major league franchise.

== Playing career ==
Lemon was born in Covington, Virginia. The lanky 6 ft 4 in (1.93 m)/200 lb (91 kg) prospect was known as "Bob" before he signed with the Cleveland Indians in 1948. He became known as "Jim Lemon" to avoid confusion with Indians' future Hall of Fame pitcher Bob Lemon, but he never won a regular job with Cleveland. Instead, Lemon was a "late-bloomer" who required several trips to the minor leagues before finally winning a regular berth at the age of 28 with the 1956 Washington Senators.

A free-swinger who three times led the American League in strikeouts, Lemon and his teammates benefitted from new Washington owner Calvin Griffith's decision to move the left field fences closer to home plate in the Senators' cavernous Griffith Stadium. Lemon hit 27 homers in 1956, also leading the league in triples, then followed with 26 (1958), 33 (1959) and 38 (1960). He twice compiled over 100 runs batted in and became a favorite of then U.S. President Dwight Eisenhower after Eisenhower attended Lemon's three-home-run performance at Griffith Stadium on August 31, 1956.

However, the home run exploits of Lemon and his teammates were more than offset by poor pitching, and after multiple second-division finishes in the AL, Griffith moved the Senators to Minneapolis–Saint Paul after the 1960 campaign, where they became the Minnesota Twins (and an expansion team, the "new" Washington Senators, took their place in the U.S. capital). But Lemon left his stroke behind, and after only 14 homers in Minnesota in 1961 and an injury-ruined 1962, his career wound down quickly. His last year as a player, 1963, was divided among the Twins, Philadelphia Phillies and Chicago White Sox. All told, he appeared in 1,010 games over all or parts of 12 major league seasons, posting a career batted off .262 and hitting 164 home runs.

== Coach and manager ==
Lemon remained in the game, first as a minor-league manager, then as a coach for the Twins, serving two different terms (1965–67; 1981–84) in that role, including with the 1965 pennant-winning team. In between, in 1968, he returned to Washington as manager of the expansion Senators, but his popularity as a player did not translate to a successful managerial record. His club finished last in the ten-team American League, winning 65 games and losing 96 (.404)—in spite of fearsome, right-handed home run champion Frank Howard (acquired in trade from the Los Angeles Dodgers in 1965). Lemon was fired after only one season, replaced by Ted Williams.

As a native son, and to honor his batting achievements with the original Senators, Lemon was elected to the Virginia Sports Hall of Fame in 1988.

Jim Lemon died from cancer at the age of 78 at his Brandon, Mississippi, home.

== See also ==
- List of Major League Baseball annual triples leaders
