= Oak, Nebraska =

- Village
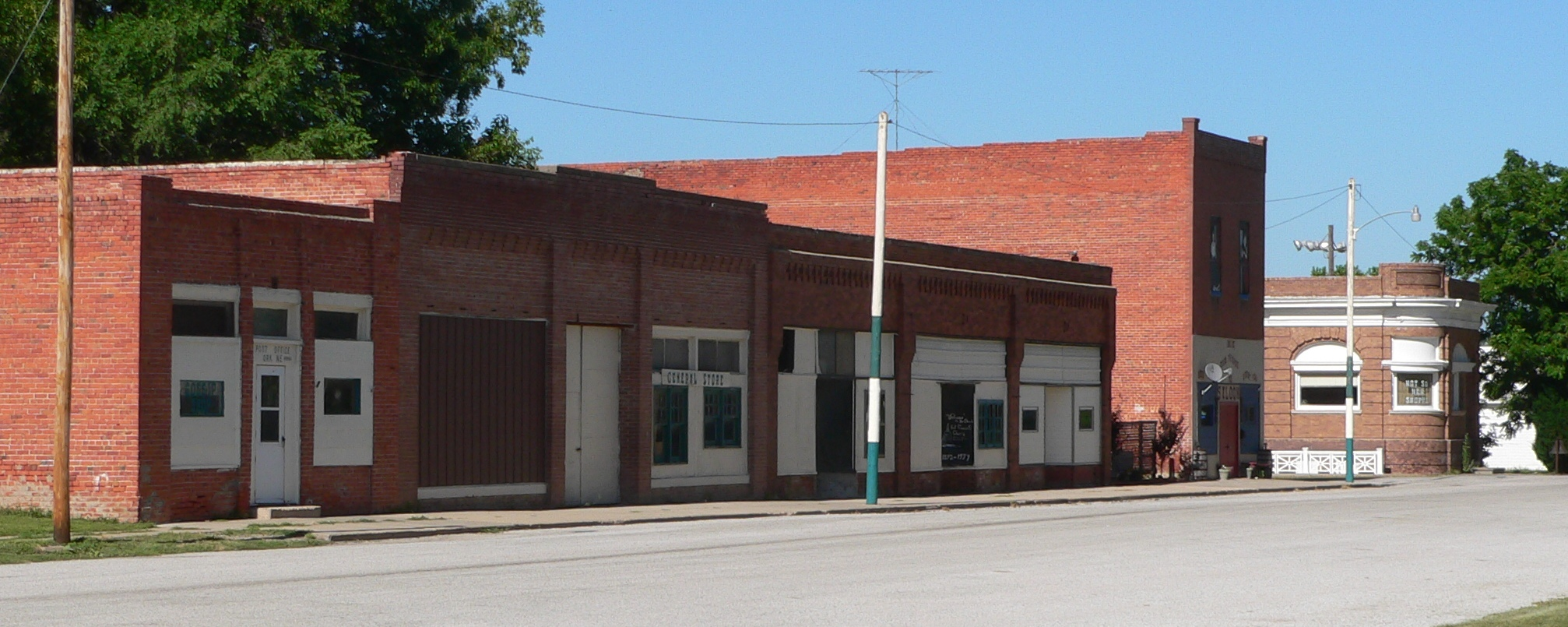
- Downtown Oak: north side of Maple Street

- Location of Oak, Nebraska
- Coordinates: 40°14′17″N 97°54′13″W
- Country: United States
- State: Nebraska
- County: Nuckolls

Area
  - Total: 0.15 sq mi (0.39 km^{2})
  - Land: 0.15 sq mi (0.39 km^{2})
  - Water: 0 sq mi (0.00 km^{2})
- Elevation: 1,585 ft (483 m)

Population (2020)
  - Total: 54
  - Density: 355.8/sq mi (137.36/km^{2})
- Time zone: UTC-6 (Central (CST))
  - Summer (DST): UTC-5 (CDT)
- ZIP code: 68964
- Area code: 402
- FIPS code: 31-35245
- GNIS feature ID: 2399532

Oak (/oʊk/) is a village in Nuckolls County, Nebraska, United States. As of the 2020 census, Oak had a population of 54.

== History ==
The first settlement was made in the Oak area in the 1860s. Oak was platted on its current site in 1888 when the Fremont, Elkhorn & Missouri Valley Railroad was extended to that point. It was named from nearby Oak Creek.

== Geography ==
According to the United States Census Bureau, the village has a total area of 0.15 square miles (0.39 km^{2}), all land.

== Demographics ==
Historical population
Census	Pop.	Note	%±
1910	237		—
1920	201		−15.2%
1930	218		8.5%
1940	177		−18.8%
1950	131		−26.0%
1960	125		−4.6%
1970	100		−20.0%
1980	79		−21.0%
1990	68		−13.9%
2000	60		−11.8%
2010	66		10.0%
2020	54		−18.2%
U.S. Decennial Census; 2012 Estimate

=== 2010 census ===
As of the census of 2010, there were 66 people, 30 households, and 15 families living in the village. The population density was 440.0 inhabitants per square mile (169.9/km^{2}). There were 38 housing units at an average density of 253.3 per square mile (97.8/km^{2}). The racial makeup of the village was 98.5% White and 1.5% from two or more races. Hispanic or Latino of any race were 1.5% of the population.

There were 30 households, of which 33.3% had children under the age of 18 living with them, 46.7% were married couples living together, 3.3% had a female householder with no husband present, and 50.0% were non-families. 40.0% of all households were made up of individuals, and 3.3% had someone living alone who was 65 years of age or older. The average household size was 2.20 and the average family size was 3.07.

The median age in the village was 33.5 years. 25.8% of residents were under the age of 18; 7.6% were between the ages of 18 and 24; 33.4% were from 25 to 44; 25.8% were from 45 to 64; and 7.6% were 65 years of age or older. The gender makeup of the village was 54.5% male and 45.5% female.

=== 2000 census ===
As of the census of 2000, there were 60 people, 31 households, and 15 families living in the village. The population density was 405.1 inhabitants per square mile (156.4/km^{2}). There were 36 housing units at an average density of 243.1 per square mile (93.9/km^{2}). The racial makeup of the village was 100.00% White.

There were 31 households, out of which 25.8% had children under the age of 18 living with them, 38.7% were married couples living together, and 48.4% were non-families. 41.9% of all households were made up of individuals, and 25.8% had someone living alone who was 65 years of age or older. The average household size was 1.94 and the average family size was 2.63.

In the village, the population was spread out, with 20.0% under the age of 18, 13.3% from 18 to 24, 16.7% from 25 to 44, 18.3% from 45 to 64, and 31.7% who were 65 years of age or older. The median age was 46 years. For every 100 females, there were 114.3 males. For every 100 females age 18 and over, there were 118.2 males.

As of 2000 the median income for a household in the village was $21,875, and the median income for a family was $27,500. Males had a median income of $19,688 versus $12,500 for females. The per capita income for the village was $11,460. There were 5.0% of families and 17.5% of the population living below the poverty line, including 46.2% of under eighteens and 19.0% of those over 64.

== Notable person ==
- Russ Snyder, baseball player
