= Fred Valentine (baseball) =

American baseball player (1935–2022)

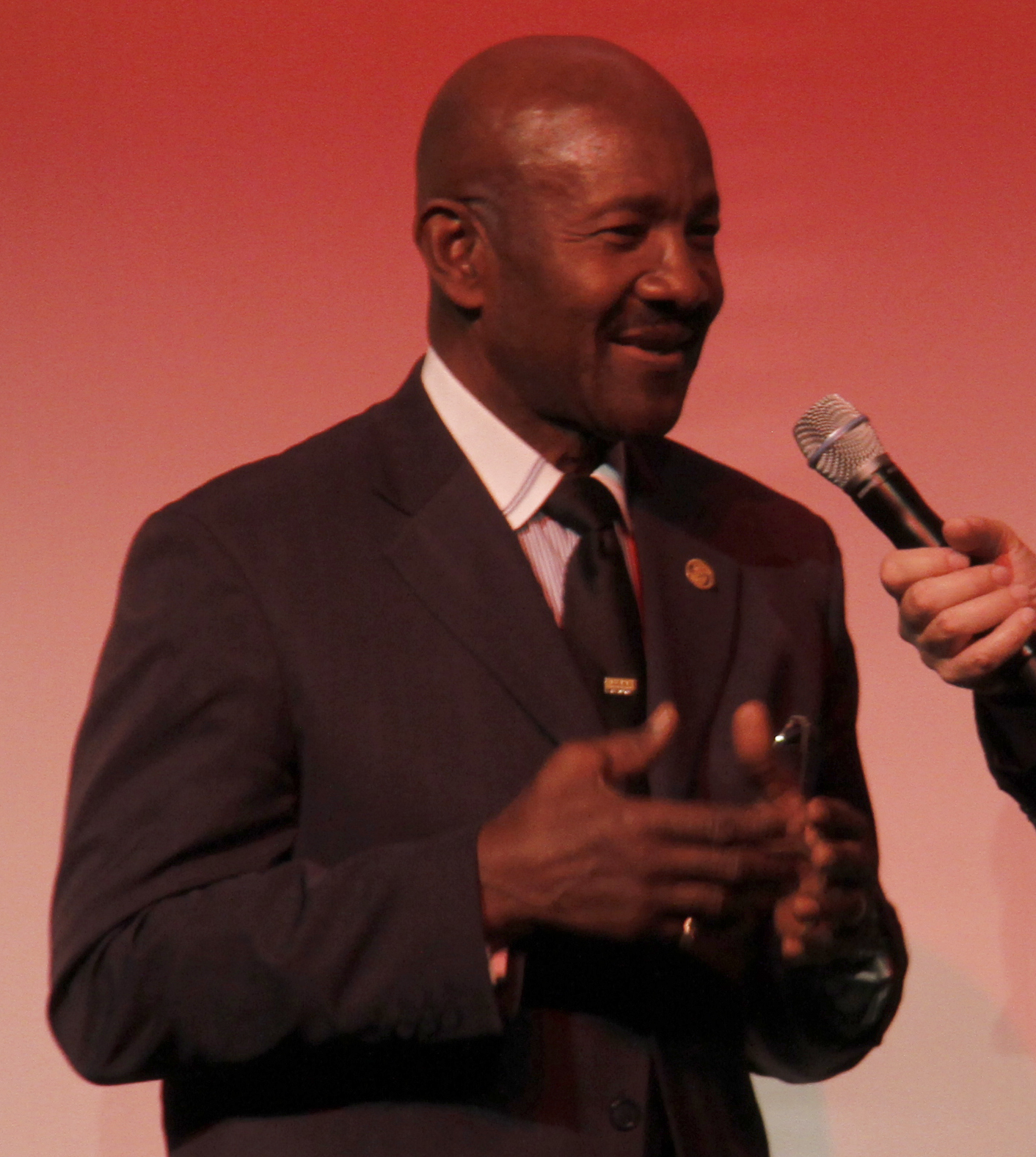
- Valentine in 2011
- Outfielder
- Born: January 19, 1935; Clarksdale, Mississippi, U.S.
- Died: December 26, 2022 (aged 87); Washington, D.C., U.S.
- Batted: Switch Threw: Right

MLB debut
- September 7, 1959, for the Baltimore Orioles

Last MLB appearance
- September 24, 1968, for the Baltimore Orioles

MLB statistics
- Batting average: .247
- Home runs: 36
- Runs batted in: 138

NPB statistics
- Batting average: .246
- Home runs: 11
- Runs batted in: 46
- Stats at Baseball Reference

Teams
- Baltimore Orioles (1959, 1963); Washington Senators (1964–1968); Baltimore Orioles (1968); Hanshin Tigers (1970)

Fred Lee Valentine (January 19, 1935 – December 26, 2022) was an American professional baseball outfielder. He appeared in 533 games over all or part of seven seasons in Major League Baseball for the Baltimore Orioles (1959, 1963, and 1968) and Washington Senators (1964–1968). He also played one season for the Hanshin Tigers of Nippon Professional Baseball in 1970. Valentine was a switch hitter who threw right-handed; he was listed as 6 feet 1 inch (1.85 m) tall and 190 pounds (86 kg).

Valentine attended Tennessee State University and signed with Baltimore in 1956. After completing four seasons in the Orioles' farm system, he was called to Baltimore for his first MLB trial during the final month of the 1959 season. In limited service (12 games total, with seven starts in the outfield), he batted .316 with two multi-hit games. He then returned to the top level of minor league baseball, and would not get his second chance with the Orioles until his recall in June 1963. Again, he played sparingly (getting into only 26 games), but he batted .268 as a backup outfielder and pinch hitter. His contract was then sold to the Senators in October. In 1964, Valentine finally spent extended time on a big-league roster, getting into 102 games and substituting in all three outfield positions. But he struggled offensively, hitting only .226, and was demoted to Triple-A Hawaii for 1965. He then had a banner season with the Islanders, slugging 25 home runs, batting .324, and leading the Pacific Coast League in runs scored (116), earning him a September callup with the 1965 Senators.

That campaign led to Valentine's career-best season, in 1966. He played in 146 games, starting 127 of them as either Washington's center fielder or right fielder. At the plate, he set personal bests in home runs (16) and runs batted in (59), while hitting a robust .276, second on the team to slugger Frank Howard's .278. He led the Senators in runs scored (77), hits (140) and doubles (29). Then, in 1967, Valentine returned for another season as the Senators' "fourth" outfielder: he played in 150 games in all, and got into 136 games as an outfielder with 111 starts, most of these coming in center and right fields. However, his offensive production fell off in every category, as he hit .234 with 11 home runs. Returning to Washington in 1968, he appeared in 26 games in the outfield during the season's first two months. But he again struggled at the plate, batting .238.

He was traded back to the Orioles from the Senators for Bruce Howard before the trade deadline on June 15, 1968. His acquisition by the Orioles was insurance in case Paul Blair was ordered to report for active duty with the United States Army. Valentine then concluded his MLB career as a reserve outfielder, hitting only .187 for Baltimore. On the cusp of winning three straight American League pennants (1969–1971), Baltimore outrighted Valentine to Triple-A Rochester for 1969. That season, the 34-year-old enjoyed one last productive minor-league campaign, hitting .287 with 18 homers. He then played a final year of professional baseball in Japan, where he batted .246 with 11 long balls for Hanshin.

All told, Valentine batted .247 in major league action, collecting 360 hits, with 56 career doubles, ten triples and 36 homers. He had 138 runs batted in.

Valentine died on December 26, 2022, at the age of 87.
