= Lorenzo Fernández (baseball) =

Cuban baseball player (1939–2020)

- Shortstop / Second baseman
- Born: April 23, 1939; Havana, Cuba
- Died: November 30, 2020 (aged 81); Miami, Florida, U.S.
- Batted: Right Threw: Right

MLB debut
- April 20, 1968, for the Baltimore Orioles

Last MLB appearance
- September 15, 1968, for the Baltimore Orioles

MLB statistics
- Batting average: .111
- Home runs: 0
- Runs batted in: 0
- Stats at Baseball Reference

Teams
- Baltimore Orioles (1968)

Lorenzo Marto "Chico" Fernández Mosquera (April 23, 1939 – November 30, 2020) was a Cuban professional baseball player who appeared in 24 games played during 1968 for the Baltimore Orioles of Major League Baseball. He threw and batted right-handed, stood 5 feet 10 inches (1.78 m) tall and weighed 160 pounds (73 kg).

Fernández was primarily a shortstop and second baseman during his minor league career, which began in 1958 in the Detroit Tigers' system. (Coincidentally, the MLB Tigers would feature Humberto "Chico" Fernández, a fellow Cuban, as their regular shortstop between 1960 and 1962.) In 1962, Lorenzo Fernández departed the Detroit organization briefly, playing in the Milwaukee Braves' system, and the next year he joined the Chicago White Sox organization. Baltimore acquired him after the 1967 season. He made the 1968 Orioles' Major League roster out of spring training. In his debut, as a pinch hitter on April 20 against the California Angels at Anaheim Stadium, he singled off Angel pitcher Bobby Locke in the eighth inning of a 10–1 Oriole triumph. It would be almost four months (August 16) before he would get his second hit, also a pinch single and this off Minnesota Twins' left-hander Jim Kaat.

Fernández started only two games, a doubleheader against the Athletics at Oakland on June 16. Otherwise he served as a late-inning replacement for regular Baltimore shortstop Mark Belanger or second baseman Davey Johnson. He compiled 19 plate appearances and included one base on balls with his two hits during the season. He briefly played for the 1969 Rochester Red Wings before leaving the game.

Fernández died November 30, 2020.
