= Gerry Schoen =

American baseball player (1947–2021)

- Pitcher
- Born: January 20, 1947; New Orleans, Louisiana, U.S.
- Died: May 5, 2021 (aged 74); Tullahoma, Tennessee, U.S.
- Batted: Right Threw: Right

MLB debut
- September 14, 1968, for the Washington Senators

Last MLB appearance
- September 14, 1968, for the Washington Senators

MLB statistics
- Pitching Record: 0–1
- Earned run average: 7.36
- Strikeouts: 1
- Stats at Baseball Reference

Teams
- Washington Senators (1968)

Gerald Thomas Schoen (January 20, 1947 – May 5, 2021) was an American professional baseball pitcher who appeared in one game in Major League Baseball as a member of the Washington Senators in 1968. A native of New Orleans, he threw and batted right-handed and was listed as 6 feet 3 inches (1.91 m) tall and 215 pounds (98 kg).

Schoen entered baseball when Washington drafted him out of Loyola University New Orleans with its 22nd selection in the 1966 Major League Baseball draft. His lone MLB appearance came at the end of his third season in the minor leagues when rosters expanded from 25 to 40 men. Schoen was the starting pitcher against the New York Yankees on September 14 at District of Columbia Stadium. After facing the minimum of six hitters in his first two innings, Schoen surrendered a run in the third, and then a two-run home run by Roy White in the fourth. He was relieved by fellow rookie Jim Miles with two out and the Senators trailing, 3–0. New York won the contest, 4–1, with Schoen absorbing the loss in his only big-league game.

In 32/3 innings pitched, he allowed three earned runs on six hits and one base on balls, and had one strikeout—the first batter he faced, Horace Clarke. Schoen went 0-for-1 in his only MLB at-bat against the Yankees' starter and winner, Al Downing.

He pitched three more seasons in the minors before retiring from baseball after the 1971 campaign.
