= Frank Coggins =

American baseball player (1944–1994)

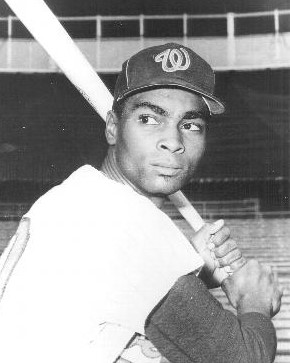
- Second baseman
- Born: May 22, 1944; Griffin, Georgia, U.S.
- Died: October 30, 1994 (aged 50); Atlanta, Georgia, U.S.
- Batted: Switch Threw: Right

MLB debut
- September 10, 1967, for the Washington Senators

Last MLB appearance
- July 30, 1972, for the Chicago Cubs

MLB statistics
- Batting average: .215
- Home runs: 1
- Runs batted in: 15
- Stats at Baseball Reference

Teams
- Washington Senators (1967–1968); Chicago Cubs (1972)

Franklin Coggins (May 22, 1944 – October 30, 1994) was an American professional baseball player. A switch-hitting native of Griffin, Georgia, who primarily played second base and shortstop, Coggins stood 6 feet 2 inches (1.88 m) tall, weighed 187 pounds (85 kg), and threw right-handed.

He was traded along with Roy Foster and cash from the Milwaukee Brewers to the Cleveland Indians for Russ Snyder and Max Alvis during spring training on April 4, 1970.

Coggins' professional career lasted 11 seasons (1963–1973). He played parts of three seasons in Major League Baseball as a second baseman with the Washington Senators (1967–1968) and Chicago Cubs (1972). His most sustained period in the Major Leagues came with the 1968 Senators, for whom he appeared in 62 games and batted .175 with 30 hits in 171 at bats, including six doubles and one triple.

Coggins died at age 50 in Atlanta, Georgia.
