= David Howard (baseball) =

American baseball player (born 1967)

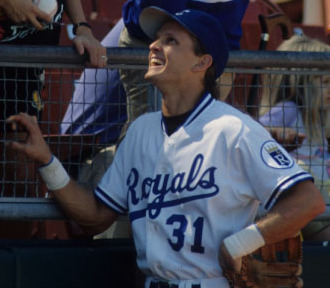
- Howard with the Kansas City Royals in 1991
- Shortstop / Second baseman
- Born: February 26, 1967 (age 59); Sarasota, Florida, U.S.
- Batted: Switch Threw: Right

MLB debut
- April 14, 1991, for the Kansas City Royals

Last MLB appearance
- October 1, 1999, for the St. Louis Cardinals

MLB statistics
- Batting average: .229
- Home runs: 11
- Runs batted in: 148
- Stats at Baseball Reference

Teams
- Kansas City Royals (1991–1997); St. Louis Cardinals (1998–1999)

David Wayne Howard (born February 26, 1967) is an American professional baseball scout and former Major League Baseball player. He was a utilityman who played in the majors from 1991 through 1999 for the Kansas City Royals (1991–97) and St. Louis Cardinals (1998–99). Listed at 6 feet (1.8 m) and 175 lb. (80 kg), he was a switch-hitter and threw right-handed. His father, pitcher Bruce Howard, played in the big leagues during the 1960s.

Before heading to college, Howard attended and played baseball for Riverview High School. Howard attended the State College of Florida, Manatee–Sarasota. He was able to play all infield and outfield positions, and had the ability to serve as an emergency pitcher. His most productive offensive season came in 1996, when he posted career highs in games (143), runs (51), hits (92), extrabases (23) and RBI (48), while hitting a .243 batting average. On June 10, 1997, in the 5th inning of a game against the Anaheim Angels, Howard hit a long fly ball over the head of Jim Edmonds. Edmonds would make a spectacular over-the-shoulder diving catch to rob Howard of extra bases. The catch is considered one of the greatest catches in MLB history. In a nine-season career, Howard was a .229 hitter (362-for-1,583) with 11 home runs and 148 RBI in 645 total games, including 169 runs, 57 doubles, 14 triples, and 23 stolen bases. In the field, Howard most frequently played shortstop (361 games), second base (142) and the outfield (66).

Howard began his coaching career in the New York Mets' farm system in 2001. In 2004, he joined the Boston Red Sox as a minor league instructor before becoming a scout. He moved into their front office at the close of the 2007 season, spending 2008–09 as special assistant to Boston general manager Theo Epstein. In 2010, he succeeded Rob Leary as the Red Sox' field coordinator of minor league instruction and served in that role through 2018. He was named special assignment scout by the Chicago Cubs in 2019, reuniting him with Epstein.

== See also ==
- List of second-generation Major League Baseball players
