= Bruce Howard (baseball) =

American baseball player (born 1943)

- Pitcher
- Born: March 23, 1943 (age 83); Salisbury, Maryland, U.S.
- Batted: Switch Threw: Right

MLB debut
- September 4, 1963, for the Chicago White Sox

Last MLB appearance
- September 7, 1968, for the Washington Senators

MLB statistics
- Win–loss record: 26–31
- Earned run average: 3.18
- Strikeouts: 349
- Stats at Baseball Reference

Teams
- Chicago White Sox (1963–1967); Baltimore Orioles (1968); Washington Senators (1968)

Bruce Ernest Howard (born March 23, 1943) is an American former Major League Baseball pitcher with the Chicago White Sox, Baltimore Orioles and Washington Senators between 1963 and 1968. A native of Salisbury, Maryland, he attended Villanova University. His son, David Howard, also played in the major leagues.

He was traded along with Don Buford and Roger Nelson from the White Sox to the Orioles for Luis Aparicio, Russ Snyder and John Matias on November 29, 1967. He went 0–2 with a 3.77 earned run average (ERA) in 31 innings with the Orioles before being dealt to the Senators for Fred Valentine before the trade deadline on June 15, 1968.

In a six-season career, Howard posted a 26–31 record with 349 strikeouts and a 3.18 ERA in 120 appearances, including seven complete games, four shutouts, one save, and 528 2/3 innings of work.

== See also ==
- List of second-generation Major League Baseball players
