= John Morris (pitcher) =

American baseball player (1941–2025)

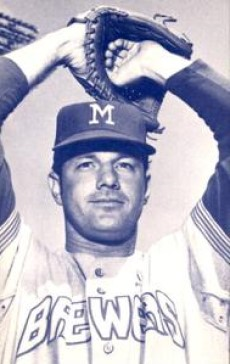
- Pitcher
- Born: August 23, 1941; Lewes, Delaware, U.S.
- Died: October 15, 2025 (aged 84); Scottsdale, Arizona, U.S.
- Batted: Right Threw: Left

MLB debut
- July 19, 1966, for the Philadelphia Phillies

Last MLB appearance
- October 2, 1974, for the San Francisco Giants

MLB statistics
- Win–loss record: 11–7
- Earned run average: 3.95
- Strikeouts: 137
- Stats at Baseball Reference

Teams
- Philadelphia Phillies (1966); Baltimore Orioles (1968); Seattle Pilots / Milwaukee Brewers (1969–1971); San Francisco Giants (1972–1974)

John Wallace Morris (August 23, 1941 – October 15, 2025) was an American Major League Baseball pitcher. A left-hander, he appeared in 132 games played, all but ten as a relief pitcher, during all or parts of eight seasons between 1966 and 1974 for the Philadelphia Phillies, Baltimore Orioles, Seattle Pilots / Milwaukee Brewers and San Francisco Giants. He batted right-handed and was listed as 6 feet 2 inches (1.88 m) tall and 195 pounds (88 kg).

== Biography ==
Morris was born in Lewes, Delaware, and graduated from Lewes High School. He signed with the nearby Phillies in 1960, played 5 1/2 years in their farm system, and made his MLB debut in July 1966. He appeared in 13 games through the end of September, going 1–1 with a 5.27 ERA. He spent all of 1967 back in Triple-A. He was traded from the Phillies to the Orioles on December 18, 1967, completing a transaction from one year earlier when Dick Hall was sent to Philadelphia on December 15, 1966. In 1968, Morris made 19 relief appearances for the Orioles, posting a 2–0 record and a 2.56 ERA. That autumn, he was selected in the American League expansion draft by the fledgling Seattle Pilots.

Morris split his 1969 season between Seattle and Triple-A, but the following year, when Pilots had become the Milwaukee Brewers, he spent the first of two straight years as a full-season major leaguer. Morris was a Brewer for 69 games, more than half of his MLB appearances, and threw his only two complete games; they happened in two consecutive starts in May 1970, on the 13th against the New York Yankees, a three-hit, 3–1 triumph, and the 19th against the Oakland Athletics, a 6–3 win over Catfish Hunter. Traded to the Giants after the 1971 season, he appeared in 31 total games over three seasons (1972–1974).

In 132 MLB games, he posted an 11–7 won–lost record, with two saves. He allowed 227 hits and 86 walks in 2321/3 innings pitched, with 137 strikeouts.

He was inducted into the Delaware Sports Hall of Fame in 1987.

Morris died on October 15, 2025, at the age of 84.
