= Vern Fuller =

American baseball player (born 1944)

- Second baseman/Third baseman
- Born: March 1, 1944 (age 82); Menomonie, Wisconsin, U.S.
- Batted: Right Threw: Right

MLB debut
- September 5, 1964, for the Cleveland Indians

Last MLB appearance
- October 1, 1970, for the Cleveland Indians

MLB statistics
- Batting average: .232
- Home runs: 14
- Runs batted in: 65
- Stats at Baseball Reference

Teams
- Cleveland Indians (1964, 1966–1970)

Vernon Gordon Fuller (born March 1, 1944) is an American former professional baseball player. The second baseman and third baseman appeared in 325 Major League games over six seasons for the Cleveland Indians in 1964 and from 1966 to 1970. He threw and batted right-handed, stood 6 feet 1 inch (1.85 m) tall and weighed 170 pounds (77 kg) as an active player.

Fuller graduated from Canoga Park High School in Southern California and attended what is now California State University, Northridge and Arizona State University. Signing with Cleveland in 1963, he split his first pro season between Class A and Double-A in the Indians' farm system. He then spent the entire 1964 season on Cleveland's MLB roster, although he was on the disabled list until early September. In his big-league debut, as a pinch hitter September 5, he grounded out to Joel Horlen of the Chicago White Sox.

Fuller returned to the minor leagues for most of 1965–1966. He split 1967 between the Indians and the Triple-A Portland Beavers, then spent both 1968 and 1969 as the Tribe's regular second baseman. But he never batted higher than .242 and in 1970 he lost his regular job to Eddie Leon. It was his final season in professional baseball.

As a Major Leaguer, Fuller collected 182 hits, including 33 doubles, four triples and 14 home runs.
