= José Vidal (baseball) =

Dominican baseball player (1940–2011)

- Outfielder
- Born: April 3, 1940; Batey Lechuga, El Seibo, Dominican Republic
- Died: January 7, 2011 (aged 70); La Romana, La Romana, Dominican Republic
- Batted: Right Threw: Right

Professional debut
- MLB: September 5, 1966, for the Cleveland Indians
- NPB: July 23, 1971, for the Nishitetsu Lions

Last appearance
- MLB: May 16, 1969, for the Seattle Pilots
- NPB: October 3, 1971, for the Nishitetsu Lions

MLB statistics
- Batting average: .164
- Home runs: 3
- Runs batted in: 10

NPB statistics
- Batting average: .221
- Home runs: 2
- Runs batted in: 9
- Stats at Baseball Reference

Teams
- Cleveland Indians (1966–1968); Seattle Pilots (1969); Nishitetsu Lions (1971)

José Vidal Nicolás (April 3, 1940 – January 7, 2011), nicknamed "Papito", was a Dominican Major League Baseball (MLB) outfielder. He was signed by the San Francisco Giants as an amateur free agent before the 1958 season. He played for the Cleveland Indians (1966–1968) and Seattle Pilots (1969). He also played one season in Japan for the Nishitetsu Lions (1971). During a four-year major league baseball career, Vidal hit .164 with three home runs and 10 runs batted in (RBI) in 88 career games.

Vidal was a very good minor league hitter, but a poor fielder. He led his league three times in errors by an outfielder (1959, 1965 and 1966). Playing for the Hobbs Pirates of the Sophomore League in 1960, he hit .342 with 17 home runs and 81 RBI from just 93 games. In 1963, Vidal won the California League Triple Crown while playing for the Single-A Reno Silver Sox. He had a batting average of .340 with 40 home runs and 162 RBI in 139 games and was named the league's Most Valuable Player. He was called up to the Indians in September 1966 after hitting .293 with 15 home runs and 57 RBI in 115 games for the Triple-A Portland Beavers of the Pacific Coast League.

He made his major league debut as a pinch hitter on September 5, 1966, against the Boston Red Sox at Cleveland Stadium. Batting for pitcher Tom Kelley in the bottom of the sixth inning against Lee Stange, he flew out to right fielder Tony Conigliaro. The Tribe lost that game, the first of a doubleheader, 5–1, but won the nightcap by a score of 3–1. His first major league hit came 12 days later, in his first appearance in the starting lineup, with a two-run triple against Mickey Lolich at Tiger Stadium.

During his four stints in the big leagues, Vidal never got on track at the plate, with successive averages of .188, .118, .167 and .192. He made 53 appearances in the outfield, 35 of which were starts, and, ironically, was charged with just one error in 65 total chances. On May 19, 1969, Vidal was traded by the Seattle Pilots to the New York Yankees, and never again appeared in a big league game.

Vidal's career highlights included hitting a walk-off home run off of Jack Fisher in a game against the Chicago White Sox in the bottom of the 14th inning on June 3, 1968.

== Trivia ==
- Vidal's first and last big league hits were both triples.
- His walk-off home run on June 3, 1968, earned teammate Hal Kurtz his first and only major league win.
