= Max Alvis =

American baseball player (born 1938)

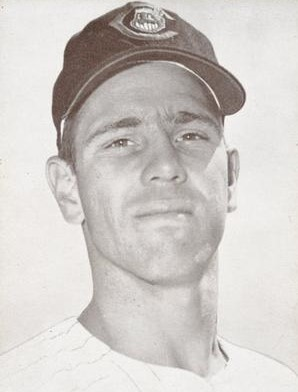
- Alvis with the Cleveland Indians in 1962
- Third baseman
- Born: February 2, 1938 (age 88); Jasper, Texas, U.S.
- Batted: Right Threw: Right

MLB debut
- September 11, 1962, for the Cleveland Indians

Last MLB appearance
- September 27, 1970, for the Milwaukee Brewers

MLB statistics
- Batting average: .247
- Home runs: 111
- Runs batted in: 373
- Stats at Baseball Reference

Teams
- Cleveland Indians (1962–1969); Milwaukee Brewers (1970)

Career highlights and awards
- 2× All-Star (1965, 1967)

Roy Maxwell Alvis (born February 2, 1938) is an American former professional baseball player. He played in Major League Baseball as a third baseman from 1962 through 1970, most notably for the Cleveland Indians, where he became a two-time All-Star. He played his final season with the Milwaukee Brewers.

== Early life ==
Alvis was born on February 2, 1938, in Jasper, Texas, and graduated from Jasper High School (Jasper, Texas). He attended the University of Texas at Austin, where he played both football (under coaching legend Darrell Royal) and baseball, leading the Southwest Conference in batting average.

== Professional career ==
=== Minor league ===
Alvis was signed by the Cleveland Indians as an amateur free agent in 1958. He played in Cleveland's minor league system from 1959 to 1962. In 1960, he had a .343 batting average for the Minot Mallards of the Class-C Northern League. In 1962, playing for the Triple-A Salt Lake City Bees of the Pacific Coast League, Alvis hit .319, with 25 home runs, 113 runs scored, 91 runs batted in (RBI), 35 doubles, 11 triples and a .921 on-base plus slugging percentage (OPS).

On the downside, Alvis was error prone as a fielder. As a third basemen, he had 44 errors in 115 games in 1959, and 42 in 115 games in 1960. He improved somewhat with 24 errors in 115 games in 1961, and 39 in 150 games in 1962. He best minor league fielding percentage was .935.

=== Major league ===
Alvis was called up to Cleveland at the end of the 1962 season, and he played his first major league game on September 11, 1962.

Alvis became the everyday third baseman for the Indians in 1963. He enjoyed single-season career-high numbers in batting average (.274), RBIs (67), runs (81), hits (165), doubles (32) and triples (7). He added 22 home runs (also a personal high), and appeared to be on his way to stardom. He was 17th in MVP voting. He still had fielding issues, with 28 errors (fourth worst in the major leagues among all third basemen) and a .942 fielding percentage, though he led the league's third basemen with 170 putouts. He also led the league in being hit by pitches (10).

In late June 1964, Alvis was hospitalized with spinal meningitis. He was diagnosed on a flight back from playing in Minnesota. All the players and crew who flew with him from Minnesota before his diagnosis and hospitalization received cautionary treatment to prevent the disease from spreading. His condition improved with treatment within a day, but he was placed on the disabled list and Chico Salmon was called up to replace him. Before Alvis was hospitalized, Cleveland was 13 wins over .500; in his absence, the team's record was 11 wins and 25 losses.

Alvis was out for six weeks. He still hit 18 homers in only 381 at-bats, playing in only 107 games. His batting average fell to .252. However, his fielding percentage improved to .955, the highest it had been to date at any level of professional baseball.

Alvis made a remarkable comeback in 1965, and was an essential part of the team. He scored 88 runs and hit 21 home runs (though his average fell to .247), and was rewarded by being selected for the All-Star game, representing the American League (AL). Playing behind Brooks Robinson, Alvis only had one at bat in the All-Star game. In 1965, his fielding percentage rose again (.958), improving to 19 errors in 156 games (though still third worst in the AL), and again leading AL third basemen in putouts with 169. He also led the league again in being hit by pitches (9).

Alvis turned in a solid 18 home run performance in 1966 and led the team with 21 in 1967, batting .245 and .256 respectively in those years. He was selected to the All-Star team again in 1967, appearing only as a pinch hitter. He led the league in putouts both years, with 180 and 169 respectively. His batting average fell to .223 as a full-time player in 1968, and he was relegated to spot duty with Cleveland in 1969, appearing in only 66 games. His fielding percentages from 1966 to 1968 were .958. 965 and .960.

Alvis was traded along with Russ Snyder from the Indians to the Brewers for Roy Foster, Frank Coggins and cash during spring training on April 4, 1970. This was the Brewers first year in existence after moving from Seattle. As a backup in Milwaukee, he hit .183 with three homers in 62 games, being released at the end of the season.

Over his nine-year career, Alvis hit .247, with 111 home runs, 421 runs scored, and 373 RBIs.

=== Legacy ===
Alvis never recovered the same physical qualities after suffering from spinal meningitis. His Cleveland teammate Sam McDowell observed that Alvis was the most decent person he met in baseball, and the most disciplined and well-conditioned player on the team; rarely drinking alcohol (unusual for the time). After suffering from spinal meningitis, Alvis never regained his earlier strength, stamina or endurance.

== Personal life ==
After retiring, Alvis returned to Jasper, Texas, and worked at the First National Bank of Jasper, rising from loan officer to vice-president to president.

He and his wife Frances Mae (Eddy) Alvis were married on August 23, 1958, and had two sons, Max Jr. and David. From 1985 to 1987, David played first base in Cleveland's minor league system. His grandson Sam Alvis pitched in the Miami Marlins minor league system from 2013 to 2015.
