= Roger Nelson (baseball) =

American baseball player (born 1944)

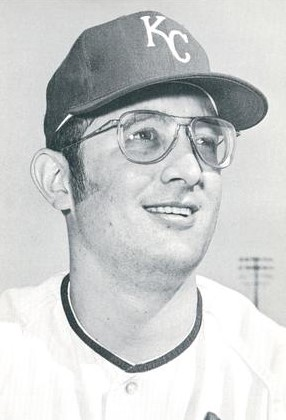
- Pitcher
- Born: June 7, 1944 (age 81); Altadena, California, U.S.
- Batted: Right Threw: Right

MLB debut
- September 9, 1967, for the Chicago White Sox

Last MLB appearance
- September 23, 1976, for the Kansas City Royals

MLB statistics
- Win–loss record: 29–32
- Earned run average: 3.06
- Strikeouts: 371
- Stats at Baseball Reference

Teams
- Chicago White Sox (1967); Baltimore Orioles (1968); Kansas City Royals (1969–1972); Cincinnati Reds (1973–1974); Kansas City Royals (1976)

Roger Eugene Nelson (born June 7, 1944) is an American former professional baseball pitcher. Nelson pitched all or part of nine seasons in Major League Baseball between 1967 and 1976 with a record of 29 wins, 32 losses, and 5 saves. Born in Altadena, California, the right-hander was listed as 6 feet 3 inches (1.91 m) tall and 200 pounds (91 kg). He attended Mount San Antonio College.

Nelson was signed by the Chicago White Sox as an amateur free agent before the 1963 season. He played four seasons in the minor leagues before earning a September call-up in 1967. He was traded along with Don Buford and Bruce Howard to the Baltimore Orioles for Luis Aparicio, Russ Snyder and John Matias on November 29, 1967. After one season with Baltimore, he was chosen by the Kansas City Royals with the first selection in the American League phase of the 1968 Major League Baseball expansion draft. Along with Wally Bunker, Nelson formed a formidable starting duo for the expansion Royals in 1969, compiling a 3.31 ERA in 29 starts. After struggling with injuries in 1970 and 1971, Nelson bounced back in 1972 to finish fifth in the league in ERA (2.08) and also setting career bests with 11 wins and 120 strikeouts. He finished his tenure with the Royals in style, throwing a complete game shutout at the Texas Rangers, 4-0, in the final regular season game ever played at Kansas City's Municipal Stadium on October 4, 1972.

Nelson was dealt along with Richie Scheinblum to the Cincinnati Reds for Hal McRae and Wayne Simpson two months later on December 1, 1972. Unfortunately, Nelson would never repeat the successes of 1969 and 1972, and he was sold back to the Chicago White Sox. He was released by the White Sox before ever pitching for them, and after a brief turn through the Oakland Athletics farm system, Nelson got one last chance with the Royals in 1976, appearing in 3 games in September to end his major league career.

== Sources ==
- Career statistics from Baseball Reference · Baseball Reference (Minors) · Retrosheet · Baseball Almanac
