= Hal Kurtz =

American baseball player (1943–2026)

- Pitcher
- Born: August 20, 1943; Washington, D.C., U.S.
- Died: October 7, 2026 (aged 83); Church Hill, Maryland, U.S.
- Batted: Right Threw: Right

MLB debut
- April 18, 1968, for the Cleveland Indians

Last MLB appearance
- August 12, 1968, for the Cleveland Indians

MLB statistics
- Win–loss record: 1–0
- Earned run average: 5.21
- Strikeouts: 16
- Stats at Baseball Reference

Teams
- Cleveland Indians (1968)

Harold James "Bud" Kurtz (August 20, 1943 – October 7, 2026) was an American Major League Baseball relief pitcher. He was signed by the Cleveland Indians before the 1962 season, and played for them in 1968. Upon making the Indians' team out of spring training in 1968, Kurtz publicly thanked Manager Alvin Dark for giving him a chance he never thought he would have. The 24-year-old rookie right-hander stood 6'3" and weighed 205 lbs.

== Biography ==
Kurtz appeared in 28 games for Cleveland, finishing 12 and saving one. In 38 innings, he gave up 37 hits (only two of those were home runs). His win-loss record was 1-0 with a 5.21 earned run average.

His finest major league effort came on June 3, 1968, at Cleveland Stadium. He entered the game against the Chicago White Sox in the top of the 10th inning with the score tied 2-2 and pitched five scoreless innings, giving up just one hit and no walks. Teammate José Vidal hit a walk-off home run in the bottom of the 14th to win the game 3-2 and get Kurtz his first and only major league win.

The son of a physician, Kurtz spent his off-seasons pursuing pre-med studies. He resided in Maryland.

Kurtz died on October 7, 2026, at the age of 83.
