= Hank Bauer =

American baseball player and manager (1922–2007)

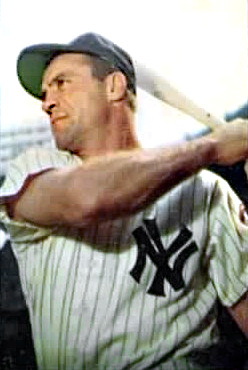
- Bauer in 1953
- Right fielder / Manager
- Born: July 31, 1922; East St. Louis, Illinois, U.S.
- Died: February 9, 2007 (aged 84); Lenexa, Kansas, U.S.
- Batted: Right Threw: Right

MLB debut
- September 6, 1948, for the New York Yankees

Last MLB appearance
- July 21, 1961, for the Kansas City Athletics

MLB statistics
- Batting average: .277
- Home runs: 164
- Runs batted in: 703
- Managerial record: 594–544
- Winning %: .522
- Stats at Baseball Reference
- Managerial record at Baseball Reference

Teams
- As player: New York Yankees (1948–1959); Kansas City Athletics (1960–1961); As manager: Kansas City Athletics (1961–1962); Baltimore Orioles (1964–1968); Oakland Athletics (1969)

Career highlights and awards
- 3× All-Star (1952–1954); 8× World Series champion (1949–1953, 1956, 1958, 1966); Baltimore Orioles Hall of Fame
Military career
Allegiance	United States
Branch	United States Marine Corps
Service years	1942–1945
Rank	Staff Sergeant
Conflicts	Battle of Guadalcanal (1942–43); Battle of Guam; Battle of Okinawa (1945)
Awards	Bronze Star (2); Purple Heart (2); Navy Commendation Medal
Other work	Professional baseball player

Henry Albert Bauer (July 31, 1922 – February 9, 2007) was an American right fielder and manager in Major League Baseball. He played with the New York Yankees (1948–1959) and Kansas City Athletics (1960–1961); he batted and threw right-handed. He served as the manager of the Athletics in both Kansas City (1961–62) and in Oakland (1969), as well as the Baltimore Orioles (1964–68), guiding the Orioles to the World Series title in 1966 in a four-game sweep over the heavily favored Los Angeles Dodgers, which was the first world championship in the history of the Orioles franchise.

== Early years ==
Bauer was born in East St. Louis, Illinois, the youngest of nine children to an Austrian immigrant who had lost his leg in an aluminum mill and had been reduced to bartending. With little money coming into the home, Bauer was forced to wear clothes made out of old feed sacks, helping shape his hard-nosed approach to life. (It was later said that his care-worn face "looked like a clenched fist".) He played baseball and basketball at East St. Louis Central Catholic High School, suffering a broken nose from an errant elbow in the latter that was never fixed. Upon graduation in 1941 he was repairing furnaces in a beer-bottling plant when his brother Herman, a minor league player in the Chicago White Sox system, was able to get him a tryout that resulted in a contract with Oshkosh of the Class D Wisconsin State League.

=== World War II – Marine Corps ===
One month after the Japanese attack on Pearl Harbor, Bauer enlisted in the U.S. Marine Corps and served with the 4th Raider Battalion and G Company, 2nd Battalion, 4th Marines. While deployed to the Pacific Theater Bauer contracted malaria on Guadalcanal, however he recovered from that well enough to earn 11 campaign ribbons through 32 months of combat, including two Bronze Stars, one with a 'V' for VALOR device, two Purple Hearts (for being wounded in action), and the Navy Commendation Medal. Bauer was wounded a second time during the Battle of Okinawa, when he was a Staff Sergeant of a platoon of 64 Marines. Only six men survived the Japanese counterattack, and Bauer was seriously wounded by shrapnel fragmentation in his left thigh. Those injuries were severe enough to send him back to the United States to recuperate.

Unfortunately Bauer's older brother Herman, once a solid hitting minor league catcher for the Chicago White Sox organization, never made it back home: after landing in the Normandy invasion, he was killed in action on July 12, 1944, and is buried in the Normandy American Cemetery in Colleville-sur-Mer, France.

=== After the war – minor league ===
Bauer returned to East St. Louis and joined the local pipe fitter's union. Stopping by the local bar where his brother Joe worked, he was signed by Danny Menendez, a scout for the New York Yankees, for a tryout with the Yankees' farm team in Quincy, Illinois. Paid $175 a month (with a $25 per month increase if he made the team) and a $250 signing bonus, Bauer batted .300 at both Quincy and the Kansas City Blues, New York's top minor league affiliate, and made his debut with the Yankees in September 1948.

== Major league career ==
=== Player ===
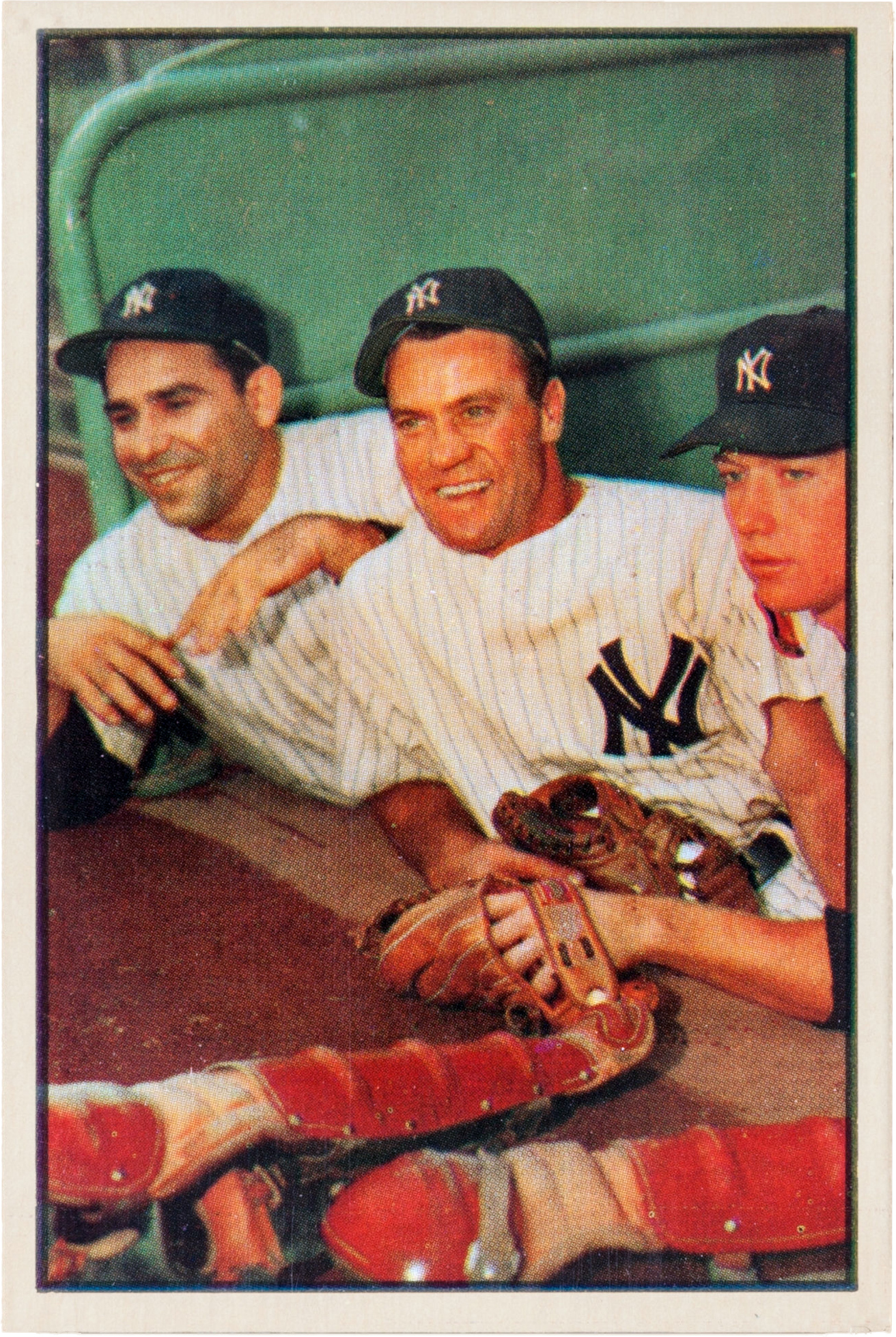
Bauer (center), with Yogi Berra and Mickey Mantle.

In his 14-season Major League Baseball career, Bauer compiled a .277 batting average with 164 home runs and 703 RBIs in 1,544 games played. He recorded a career .982 fielding percentage. Bauer played on seven World Series-winning New York Yankees teams and holds the World Series record for the longest hitting streak (17 games). Perhaps Bauer's most notable performance came in the sixth and final game of the 1951 World Series, where he hit a three-run triple. He also saved the game with a diving catch of a line drive off the bat of Sal Yvars for the final out. Bauer recorded a hit in all seven games of the 1956 World Series and 1957 World Series and the first three games of the 1958 World Series for a total of seventeen straight postseason games with a hit. His hitting streak set a major league record that was tied by Derek Jeter and Manny Ramirez over four decades later but it was not surpassed until Ketel Marte did so in 2023 (as for players with consecutive hits in World Series games, no player has surpassed the 17 by Bauer).

At the close of the 1959 season, Bauer was dealt by the Yankees to the Kansas City Athletics in a trade which brought them future home run king Roger Maris (1961). This deal is often cited among the worst examples of the numerous trades between the Yankees and the Athletics during the late 1950s – trades which were nearly always one-sided in favor of the Yankees.

In 1961, Athletics manager Joe Gordon chose to start Leo Posada over Bauer in the Opening Day starting lineup.

=== Manager ===
On June 19, 1961, the Athletics fired Gordon and Bauer was named the team's playing-manager. Bauer retired as a player one month later. He managed the team through the end of the 1962 season, going 107–157 over 264 games (for a .405 win percentage), and the A's finishing ninth in the ten-team American League both years.

=== Coach ===
After his firing at the close of the 1962 campaign, Bauer spent the 1963 season as first-base coach of the Baltimore Orioles.

=== Manager again ===
He was promoted to the Orioles' manager on November 19, 1963, succeeding Billy Hitchcock, who had been dismissed at the end of the regular season. Baltimore contended aggressively for the American League pennant in both 1964 and 1965, finishing third each year. Bolstered by the acquisition of future Hall of Fame outfielder Frank Robinson - and his Triple Crown 1966 season — the Orioles won their first AL pennant and the 1966 World Series championship. However, the ballclub, hampered by an injury to Robinson and significant off-years for a number of regulars and pitchers, finished in the second division in 1967. When the Orioles entered the 1968 All-Star break in third place and 10 1/2 games behind the eventual World Series champion Detroit Tigers, Bauer was dismissed on July 10 in favor of first-base coach Earl Weaver.

Bauer returned to the Athletics, then based in Oakland, to manage the 1969 campaign. He was fired for the second and final time by Finley after bringing Oakland home second in the new American League West Division. Overall, his regular-season managerial record was 594–544 (0.522).

=== Minor leagues ===
Bauer managed the Tidewater Tides, the AAA affiliate of the New York Mets, in 1971–72. The team made the finals of IL Governors' Cup playoffs each season, winning the title in 1972. Bauer then retired and returned home to the Kansas City area, where he scouted with the Yankees and the Kansas City Royals.

== Managerial record ==
Team	Year	Regular season					Postseason			
Team	Year	Games	Won	Lost	Win %	Finish	Won	Lost	Win %	Result
KCA	1961	102	35	67	.343	9th in AL	–	–	–	–
KCA	1962	162	72	90	.444	9th in AL	–	–	–	–
BAL	1964	162	97	65	.599	3rd in AL	–	–	–	–
BAL	1965	162	94	68	.580	3rd in AL	–	–	–	–
BAL	1966	160	97	63	.606	1st in AL	4	0	1.000	Won World Series (LAD)
BAL	1967	161	76	85	.472	7th in AL	–	–	–	–
BAL	1968	80	43	37	.538	fired	–	–	–	–
BAL total		725	407	318	.561		4	0	1.000	
OAK	1969	149	80	69	.537	fired	–	–	–	–
KCA/ OAK total		413	187	226	.453		0	0	–	
Total		1138	594	544	.522		4	0	1.000	

== Personal life ==
Bauer moved to Prairie Village, Kansas, in 1949 after playing with the nearby Kansas City Blues of 1947 and 1948. While there, he met and later married Charlene Friede, the club's office secretary. She died in July 1999.

The family's children attended St. Ann's Grade School in Prairie Village, then Bishop Miege High School in Shawnee Mission.

In 1957, a Grand Jury refused to indict Bauer in New York for alleged felony assault upon a man at the Copacabana. Whitey Ford, Mickey Mantle, Yogi Berra, Johnny Kucks and Billy Martin all testified.

Bauer owned and managed a liquor store in Prairie Village for a number of years after retirement from baseball.

He died in his home on February 9, 2007, from lung cancer, at the age of 84.

== Highlights ==
- October, 10, 1951: Bauer's bases-loaded triple led the Yankees to a 4–3 win over the New York Giants to clinch the 1951 World Series.
- Three-time American League All-Star (1952–54).
- From 1956–1958, Bauer set a World Series hitting streak record of 17 games in a row.
- Bauer led the American League in triples (nine) in 1957.
- Bauer appeared on the cover of the September 11, 1964 issue of Time magazine.

== Quotes ==
- "Hank crawled on top of the Yankee dugout and searched the stands, looking for a fan who was shouting racial slurs at Elston Howard. When asked about the incident, Bauer explained simply, 'Ellie's my friend'". —Excerpt from the book Clubhouse Lawyer, by Art Ditmar, former major league pitcher
- "Hank lost four prime years from his playing career due to his Marine service. This is heavy duty when you figure such a career is usually over when a player reaches his mid-thirties. This is something that does not bother Hank. 'I guess I knew too many great young guys who lost everything out there to worry about my losing part of a baseball career', he says."
- Tommy Lasorda on Bauer: "This guy's tough. He had a face that looked like it'd hold two days of rain."
- Bauer was a no-nonsense leader and could be unforgiving if he felt his teammates' off-the-field activities were hurting the Yankees' on-the-field performance. Pitcher Whitey Ford remembered how Bauer reacted when he thought players like Ford and Mantle were overindulging after hours: "He pinned me to the wall of the dugout one day and said, 'Don't mess with my money'." New York Times, obituary, February 10, 2007.

== See also ==
- List of famous U.S. Marines
- List of Major League Baseball annual triples leaders
- List of Major League Baseball player-managers
