= Jim Miles (baseball) =

American baseball player (born 1943)

- Pitcher
- Born: August 8, 1943 (age 82); Grenada, Mississippi, U.S.
- Batted: Right Threw: Right

MLB debut
- September 7, 1968, for the Washington Senators

Last MLB appearance
- September 9, 1969, for the Washington Senators

MLB statistics
- Win–loss record: 0–1
- Earned run average: 7.30
- Strikeouts: 20
- Stats at Baseball Reference

Teams
- Washington Senators (1968–1969)

James Charlie Miles (born August 8, 1943) is an American former professional baseball pitcher who appeared in thirteen games in Major League Baseball (MLB) for the Washington Senators over parts of the 1968 and 1969 seasons, including one start.

== Baseball Career ==
Born in Grenada, Mississippi, Miles threw and batted right-handed, stood 6 feet 2 inches (1.88 m) tall and weighed 210 pounds (95 kg) during his baseball career. He attended Delta State University.

Miles spent seven years (1966–1972) in professional baseball, all of them in the Washington/Texas Rangers organization. His MLB stints consisted of a three-game, late-season callup to Washington in 1968, then ten games during the following year. In his only start, on August 13, 1969, against the Kansas City Royals at Robert F. Kennedy Stadium, Miles lasted only two-plus innings, allowing three hits, three bases on balls, and five earned runs, and was tagged with the loss as Kansas City won, 7–3. It was Miles' only MLB decision. Overall, he permitted 27 hits and 17 walks in 242/3 innings pitched, with 20 strikeouts, in his big-league career.
