= Russ Snyder =

American baseball player (born 1934)

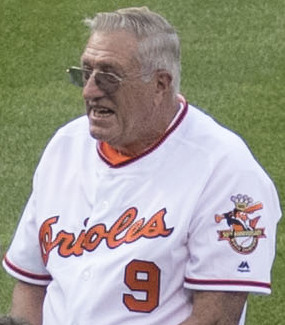
- Snyder at Camden Yards in 2016
- Outfielder
- Born: June 22, 1934 (age 92); Oak, Nebraska, U.S.
- Batted: Left Threw: Right

MLB debut
- April 18, 1959, for the Kansas City Athletics

Last MLB appearance
- September 30, 1970, for the Milwaukee Brewers

MLB statistics
- Batting average: .271
- Home runs: 42
- Runs batted in: 319
- Stats at Baseball Reference

Teams
- Kansas City Athletics (1959–1960); Baltimore Orioles (1961–1967); Chicago White Sox (1968); Cleveland Indians (1968–1969); Milwaukee Brewers (1970)

Career highlights and awards
- World Series champion (1966)

Russell Henry Snyder (born June 22, 1934) is an American former professional baseball player. He played in Major League Baseball as an outfielder for the Kansas City Athletics (1959–60), Baltimore Orioles (1961–67), Chicago White Sox (1968), Cleveland Indians (1968–69) and Milwaukee Brewers (1970). Snyder was a member of the 1966 world champion Baltimore Orioles team.

== Baseball career ==
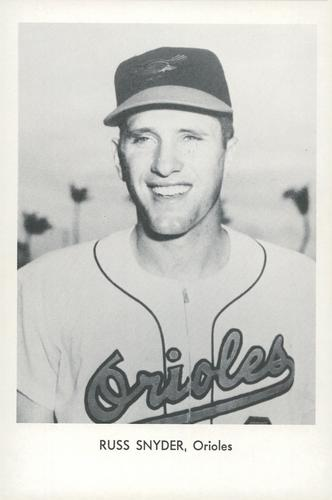
Snyder in 1966

Snyder was born in Oak, Nebraska. His professional baseball career began in 1953 in the New York Yankees' organization, when he led the Class D Sooner State League in batting average (.432) and hits (240). He played in the Yankee organization through 1958, and was traded to Kansas City on April 12, 1959, in a four-player deal. The Orioles acquired him in a seven-player trade in January 1961.

He finished third in voting for the 1959 American League Rookie of the Year Award for playing in 73 games, with 243 at bats, 41 runs scored, 76 hits, 13 doubles, two triples, three home runs, 21 runs batted in, six stolen bases, 19 walks, a .313 batting average, .367 on-base percentage, .420 slugging percentage, along with 102 total bases and 3 sacrifice hits. In 1962, Snyder's .305 batting average led the Orioles that year and in 1966, his .347 batting average at the All-Star break led the American League.

He helped the Orioles win the 1966 World Series. In a 2013 retrospective on Snyder's time with the Orioles, the Baltimore Sun called him the "unsung hero of the '66 Series" and "a sharp-fielding outfielder ... whose glove served the team down the stretch" of the 1966 American League pennant race. In the September 22nd game that year versus the Athletics, Snyder made a diving catch to end the game and clinch the pennant for the Orioles. Then, in the World Series opening game, "he saved two Dodgers runs with a dramatic lunging catch of John Roseboro's sinking liner" in centerfield, the Sun said.

With the Orioles needing to strengthen its pitching staff, Snyder was traded along with Luis Aparicio and John Matias to the Chicago White Sox for Don Buford, Bruce Howard and Roger Nelson on November 29, 1967. He was later dealt along with Max Alvis from the Indians to the Brewers for Roy Foster, Frank Coggins and cash during spring training on April 4, 1970.

Overall, in 12 MLB seasons, he played in 1,365 games and had 3,631 at bats, 488 runs scored, 984 hits, 150 doubles, 29 triples, 42 home runs, 319 RBI, 58 stolen bases, 294 walks, with a .271 batting average, .325 on-base percentage, .363 slugging percentage, and 1,318 total bases, 57 sacrifice hits, 23 sacrifice flies and 10 intentional walks. Defensively, he recorded a .981 fielding percentage playing at all three outfield positions.

Following his retirement from baseball, Snyder worked in soil conservation. He and his wife Ann (who died in 2002 after 47 years of marriage) had three children. As of 2013, Snyder makes his home in Nelson, Nebraska.
