= 1953 Philadelphia Athletics season =

1953 Philadelphia Athletics
- League: American League
- Ballpark: Connie Mack Stadium
- City: Philadelphia
- Record: 59–95 (.383)
- League place: 7th
- Owners: Earle Mack & Roy Mack
- General managers: Arthur Ehlers
- Managers: Jimmy Dykes
- Television: WPTZ/WCAU/WFIL
- Radio: WIBG (By Saam, Claude Haring)

The 1953 Philadelphia Athletics season involved the A's finishing seventh in the American League with a record of 59 wins and 95 losses, 41 1/2 games behind the New York Yankees, who would win their fifth consecutive World Series Championship. It was also the penultimate season for the franchise in Philadelphia.

== Offseason ==
- January 27, 1953: Ferris Fain and Bob Wilson (minors) were traded by the Athletics to the Chicago White Sox for Joe DeMaestri, Ed McGhee and Eddie Robinson.
- February 2, 1953: Sam Zoldak was released by the Athletics.

== Regular season ==
During the season, Bob Trice became the first black player in the history of the Athletics.

=== Season standings ===
American League
Team	W	L	Pct.	GB	Home	Road
New York Yankees	99	52	.656	—	50‍–‍27	49‍–‍25
Cleveland Indians	92	62	.597	8½	53‍–‍24	39‍–‍38
Chicago White Sox	89	65	.578	11½	41‍–‍36	48‍–‍29
Boston Red Sox	84	69	.549	16	38‍–‍38	46‍–‍31
Washington Senators	76	76	.500	23½	39‍–‍36	37‍–‍40
Detroit Tigers	60	94	.390	40½	30‍–‍47	30‍–‍47
Philadelphia Athletics	59	95	.383	41½	27‍–‍50	32‍–‍45
St. Louis Browns	54	100	.351	46½	23‍–‍54	31‍–‍46

=== Record vs. opponents ===
1953 American League record Sources:
Team	BOS	CWS	CLE	DET	NYY	PHA	SLB	WSH
Boston	—	6–16	13–9	13–9	10–11	15–7	17–5	10–12
Chicago	16–6	—	11–11–1	14–8–1	9–13	10–12	17–5	12–10
Cleveland	9–13	11–11–1	—	14–8	11–11	19–3	17–5	11–11
Detroit	9–13	8–14–1	8–14	—	6–16	11–11–3	7–15	11–11
New York	11–10	13–9	11–11	16–6	—	17–5	17–5	14–6
Philadelphia	7–15	12–10	3–19	11–11–3	5–17	—	13–9	8–14
St. Louis	5–17	5–17	5–17	15–7	5–17	9–13	—	10–12
Washington	12–10	10–12	11–11	11–11	6–14	14–8	12–10	—

=== Roster ===
1953 Philadelphia Athletics
Roster
Pitchers: 38 Charlie Bishop; 39 Harry Byrd; 25 Joe Coleman; 15 Frank Fanovich; 37 Marion Fricano; 18 Bill Harrington; 22 Alex Kellner; 21 Walt Kellner; 41 John Mackinson; 26 Morrie Martin; 34 Rinty Monahan; 20 Bobo Newsom; 23 Dick Rozek; 24 Carl Scheib; 30 Bobby Shantz; 23 Bob Trice	Catchers: 9 Joe Astroth; 14 Ray Murray; 45 Neal Watlington; Infielders: 3 Loren Babe; 2 Joe DeMaestri; 7,36 Tommy Giordano; 4 Tom Hamilton; 1 Eddie Joost; 11 Don Kolloway; 5 Cass Michaels; 8 Eddie Robinson; 12 Pete Suder; 7 Spider Wilhelm	Outfielders: 7 Allie Clark; 6 Carmen Mauro; 16 Ed McGhee; 17 Dave Philley; 6 Kite Thomas; 10 Elmer Valo; 19 Gus Zernial	Manager: 35 Jimmy Dykes; Coaches: 32 Chief Bender; 31 Les McCrabb; 33 Bing Miller; 28 Wally Moses; 29 Tom Oliver

== Player stats ==
=== Batting ===
==== Starters by position ====
Note: Pos = Position; G = Games played; AB = At bats; H = Hits; Avg. = Batting average; HR = Home runs; RBI = Runs batted in

Pos	Player	G	AB	H	Avg.	HR	RBI
C	Ray Murray	84	268	76	.284	6	41
1B	Eddie Robinson	156	615	152	.247	22	102
2B	Cass Michaels	117	411	103	.251	12	42
SS	Joe DeMaestri	111	420	107	.255	6	35
3B	Loren Babe	103	343	77	.224	0	20
OF	Gus Zernial	147	556	158	.284	42	108
OF	Ed McGhee	104	358	94	.263	1	29
OF	Dave Philley	157	620	188	.303	9	59

==== Other batters ====
Note: G = Games played; AB = At bats; H = Hits; Avg. = Batting average; HR = Home runs; RBI = Runs batted in

Player	G	AB	H	Avg.	HR	RBI
Pete Suder	115	454	130	.286	4	35
Joe Astroth	82	260	77	.296	3	24
Eddie Joost	51	177	44	.249	6	15
Carmen Mauro	64	165	44	.267	0	17
Elmer Valo	50	85	19	.224	0	9
Allie Clark	20	74	15	.203	3	13
Tom Hamilton	58	56	11	.196	0	5
Kite Thomas	24	49	6	.122	0	2
Neal Watlington	21	44	7	.159	0	3
Tommy Giordano	11	40	7	.175	2	5
Spider Wilhelm	7	7	2	.286	0	0
Don Kolloway	2	1	0	.000	0	0

=== Pitching ===
==== Starting pitchers ====
Note: G = Games pitched; IP = Innings pitched; W = Wins; L = Losses; ERA = Earned run average; SO = Strikeouts

Player	G	IP	W	L	ERA	SO
Harry Byrd	40	236.2	11	20	5.51	122
Alex Kellner	25	201.2	11	12	3.93	81
Bobby Shantz	16	105.2	5	9	4.09	58
Bob Trice	3	23.0	2	1	5.48	4

==== Other pitchers ====
Note: G = Games pitched; IP = Innings pitched; W = Wins; L = Losses; ERA = Earned run average; SO = Strikeouts

Player	G	IP	W	L	ERA	SO
Marion Fricano	39	211.0	9	12	3.88	67
Charlie Bishop	39	160.2	3	14	5.66	66
Morrie Martin	58	156.1	10	12	4.43	64
Carl Scheib	28	96.0	3	7	4.88	25
Joe Coleman	21	90.0	3	4	4.00	18

==== Relief pitchers ====
Note: G = Games pitched; W = Wins; L = Losses; SV = Saves; ERA = Earned run average; SO = Strikeouts

Player	G	W	L	SV	ERA	SO
Frank Fanovich	26	0	3	0	5.55	37
Bobo Newsom	17	2	1	0	4.89	16
Rinty Monahan	4	0	0	0	4.22	2
Dick Rozek	2	0	0	0	5.06	2
Walt Kellner	2	0	0	0	6.00	4
Bill Harrington	1	0	0	0	13.50	0
John Mackinson	1	0	0	0	0.00	0

== Farm system ==
Level	Team	League	Manager
AAA	Ottawa Athletics	International League	Frank Skaff
A	Williamsport Athletics	Eastern League	George Staller
A	Savannah Indians	Sally League	Les Bell
B	Fayetteville Athletics	Carolina League	Buck Etchison, Bill Bergeron, Bob Eiziminger and Kemp Wicker
C	St. Hyacinthe A's	Provincial League	John Sosh and Joe Rullo
D	Welch Miners	Appalachian League	Jack Crosswhite
D	Cordele A's	Georgia–Florida League	Joe Rullo and Lew Richardson
D	Hopkinsville Hoppers	KITTY League	Norm Wilson and Ed Wright

LEAGUE CHAMPIONS: Savannah, Welch
