= 1953 Chicago White Sox season =

1953 Chicago White Sox
- League: American League
- Ballpark: Comiskey Park
- City: Chicago
- Owners: Grace Comiskey
- General managers: Frank Lane
- Managers: Paul Richards
- Television: WGN-TV (Jack Brickhouse, Harry Creighton)
- Radio: WCFL (Bob Elson, Don Wells)

The 1953 Chicago White Sox season was the team's 53rd season in the major leagues, and its 54th season overall. They finished with a record of 89–65, good enough for third place in the American League, 11.5 games behind the first place New York Yankees.

== Offseason ==
- October 16, 1952: Hank Edwards and Willy Miranda were traded by the White Sox to the St. Louis Browns for Joe DeMaestri and Tommy Byrne.
- January 27, 1953: Joe DeMaestri, Ed McGhee and Eddie Robinson were traded by the White Sox to the Philadelphia Athletics for Ferris Fain and Bob Wilson (minors).

== Regular season ==
=== Season standings ===
American League
Team	W	L	Pct.	GB	Home	Road
New York Yankees	99	52	.656	—	50‍–‍27	49‍–‍25
Cleveland Indians	92	62	.597	8½	53‍–‍24	39‍–‍38
Chicago White Sox	89	65	.578	11½	41‍–‍36	48‍–‍29
Boston Red Sox	84	69	.549	16	38‍–‍38	46‍–‍31
Washington Senators	76	76	.500	23½	39‍–‍36	37‍–‍40
Detroit Tigers	60	94	.390	40½	30‍–‍47	30‍–‍47
Philadelphia Athletics	59	95	.383	41½	27‍–‍50	32‍–‍45
St. Louis Browns	54	100	.351	46½	23‍–‍54	31‍–‍46

=== Record vs. opponents ===
1953 American League record Sources:
Team	BOS	CWS	CLE	DET	NYY	PHA	SLB	WSH
Boston	—	6–16	13–9	13–9	10–11	15–7	17–5	10–12
Chicago	16–6	—	11–11–1	14–8–1	9–13	10–12	17–5	12–10
Cleveland	9–13	11–11–1	—	14–8	11–11	19–3	17–5	11–11
Detroit	9–13	8–14–1	8–14	—	6–16	11–11–3	7–15	11–11
New York	11–10	13–9	11–11	16–6	—	17–5	17–5	14–6
Philadelphia	7–15	12–10	3–19	11–11–3	5–17	—	13–9	8–14
St. Louis	5–17	5–17	5–17	15–7	5–17	9–13	—	10–12
Washington	12–10	10–12	11–11	11–11	6–14	14–8	12–10	—

=== Opening Day lineup ===
- Nellie Fox, 2B
- Ferris Fain, 1B
- Minnie Miñoso, LF
- Vern Stephens, 3B
- Jim Rivera, CF
- Sam Mele, RF
- Chico Carrasquel, SS
- Red Wilson, C
- Saul Rogovin, P

=== Notable transactions ===
- September 1, 1953: Neil Berry was selected off waivers by the White Sox from the St. Louis Browns.

=== Roster ===
1953 Chicago White Sox
Roster
Pitchers: 11 Luis Aloma; 36 Gene Bearden; 27 Tommy Byrne; 30,20 Sandy Consuegra; 29 Joe Dobson; 12 Harry Dorish; 16 Mike Fornieles; 35 Earl Harrist; 34 Hal Hudson; 24,45 Connie Johnson; 15 Bob Keegan; 23 Lou Kretlow; 19 Billy Pierce; 35,14 Saul Rogovin; 23 Virgil Trucks	Catchers: 10 Sherm Lollar; 30 Bud Sheely; 26 Red Wilson; Infielders: 34 Neil Berry; 31 Bob Boyd; 17 Chico Carrasquel; 18 Allie Clark; 20 Sam Dente; 27 Bob Elliott; 8 Ferris Fain; 2 Nellie Fox; 6 Rocky Krsnich; 25 Fred Marsh; 3 Connie Ryan; 3 Vern Stephens	Outfielders: 5 Sam Mele; 9 Minnie Miñoso; 7 Jim Rivera; 21 Bud Stewart; 38 Bill Wilson; 32 Tom Wright	Manager: 22 Paul Richards; Coaches: 44 Ray Berres; 28 Doc Cramer; 40 Luman Harris

== Player stats ==
= Indicates team leader

= Indicates league leader

=== Batting ===
Note: G = Games played; AB = At bats; R = Runs scored; H = Hits; 2B = Doubles; 3B = Triples; HR = Home runs; RBI = Runs batted in; BB = Base on balls; SO = Strikeouts; AVG = Batting average; SB = Stolen bases

Player	G	AB	R	H	2B	3B	HR	RBI	BB	SO	AVG	SB
Neil Berry, 2B	5	8	1	1	0	0	0	0	1	1	.125	0
Bob Boyd, 1B, OF	55	165	20	49	6	2	3	23	13	11	.279	1
Chico Carrasquel, SS	149	552	72	154	30	4	2	47	38	47	.279	5
Allie Clark, 1B, LF	9	15	0	1	0	0	0	0	0	5	.067	0
Sam Dente, SS	2	0	0	0	0	0	0	0	0	0	.000	0
Bob Elliott, 3B	67	208	24	54	11	1	4	32	31	21	.260	1
Ferris Fain, 1B	128	446	73	114	18	2	6	52	108	28	.256	3
Nellie Fox, 2B	154	624	92	178	31	8	3	72	49	18	.285	4
Rocky Krsnich, 3B	64	129	9	26	8	0	1	14	12	11	.202	0
Sherm Lollar, C	113	334	46	96	19	0	8	54	47	29	.287	1
Fred Marsh, 3B, SS, 1B, 2B	67	95	22	19	1	0	2	2	13	26	.200	0
Sam Mele, RF	140	481	64	132	26	8	12	82	58	47	.274	3
Minnie Miñoso, LF, RF, 3B	151	556	104	174	24	8	15	104	74	43	.313	25
Jim Rivera, CF	156	567	79	147	26	16	11	78	53	70	.259	22
Connie Ryan, 3B	17	54	6	12	1	0	0	6	9	12	.222	2
Bud Sheely, C	31	46	4	10	1	0	0	2	9	8	.217	0
Vern Stephens, 3B	44	129	14	24	6	0	1	14	13	18	.186	2
Bud Stewart, LF, RF	53	59	16	16	2	0	2	13	14	3	.271	1
Bill Wilson, CF	9	17	1	1	0	0	0	1	0	7	.059	0
Red Wilson, C	71	164	21	41	6	1	0	10	26	12	.250	2
Tom Wright, RF, LF	77	132	14	33	5	3	2	25	12	21	.250	0

Player	G	AB	R	H	2B	3B	HR	RBI	BB	SO	AVG	SB
Luis Aloma, P	24	6	0	0	0	0	0	0	0	4	.000	0
Gene Bearden, P	31	21	2	4	0	0	0	3	0	4	.190	0
Tommy Byrne, P	18	18	2	3	0	0	1	5	2	6	.167	0
Sandy Consuegra, P	29	35	1	2	0	0	0	3	1	7	.057	0
Joe Dobson, P	23	29	0	2	1	0	0	2	1	11	.069	0
Fritz Dorish, P	55	41	4	7	0	0	0	1	0	5	.171	0
Mike Fornieles, P	39	41	2	4	1	0	0	5	1	5	.098	0
Earl Harrist, P	7	1	0	0	0	0	0	0	0	0	.000	0
Connie Johnson, P	15	20	4	1	0	0	0	1	2	7	.050	0
Bob Keegan, P	22	28	4	9	0	0	0	5	1	5	.321	0
Lou Kretlow, P	9	4	0	0	0	0	0	0	1	2	.000	0
Billy Pierce, P	42	87	4	11	0	0	0	4	4	16	.126	0
Saul Rogovin, P	22	37	5	5	0	0	0	3	7	9	.135	1
Virgil Trucks, P	24	63	6	15	3	0	1	6	0	10	.238	0
Team totals	156	5212	716	1345	226	53	74	669	600	529	.258	73

=== Pitching ===
Note: W = Wins; L = Losses; ERA = Earned run average; G = Games pitched; GS = Games started; SV = Saves; IP = Innings pitched; H = Hits allowed; R = Runs allowed; ER = Earned runs allowed; HR = Home runs allowed; BB = Walks allowed; K = Strikeouts

Player	W	L	ERA	G	GS	SV	IP	H	R	ER	HR	BB	K
Luis Aloma	2	0	4.70	24	0	2	38.1	41	20	20	7	23	23
Gene Bearden	3	3	2.93	25	3	0	58.1	48	27	19	8	33	24
Tommy Byrne	2	0	10.13	6	6	0	16.0	18	18	18	0	26	4
Sandy Consuegra	7	5	2.54	29	13	3	124.0	122	39	35	9	28	30
Joe Dobson	5	5	3.67	23	15	1	100.2	96	46	41	10	37	50
Fritz Dorish	10	6	3.40	55	6	18	145.2	140	59	55	9	52	69
Mike Fornieles	8	7	3.59	39	16	3	153.0	160	68	61	8	61	72
Earl Harrist	1	0	7.56	7	0	0	8.1	9	7	7	1	5	1
Hal Hudson	0	0	0.00	1	0	0	0.2	0	0	0	0	0	0
Connie Johnson	4	4	3.56	14	10	0	60.2	55	27	24	4	38	44
Bob Keegan	7	5	2.74	22	11	1	98.2	80	34	30	4	33	32
Lou Kretlow	0	0	3.48	9	3	0	20.2	12	11	8	2	30	15
Billy Pierce	18	12	2.72	40	33	3	271.1	216	94	82	20	102	186
Saul Rogovin	7	12	5.22	22	19	1	131.0	151	82	76	17	48	62
Virgil Trucks	15	6	2.86	24	21	1	176.1	151	60	56	14	67	102
Team totals	89	65	3.41	156	156	33	1403.2	1299	592	532	113	583	714

== Farm system ==
Level	Team	League	Manager
AAA	Charleston Senators	American Association	Joe Becker
AA	Memphis Chicks	Southern Association	Luke Appling
A	Colorado Springs Sky Sox	Western League	Don Gutteridge
B	Waterloo White Hawks	Illinois–Indiana–Iowa League	Zack Taylor
C	Topeka Owls	Western Association	Ira Hutchinson
D	Madisonville Miners	KITTY League	Franklin Robinson
D	Danville Dans	Mississippi–Ohio Valley League	Virl Minnis
D	Wisconsin Rapids White Sox	Wisconsin State League	Wally Millies
