= 1953 St. Louis Browns season =

Major League Baseball season

1953 St. Louis Browns
- League: American League
- Ballpark: Busch Stadium I
- City: St. Louis, Missouri
- Record: 54–100 (.351)
- League place: 8th
- Owners: Bill Veeck
- General managers: Bill Veeck
- Managers: Marty Marion
- Radio: KMOX (Buddy Blattner, Bill Durney, Milo Hamilton)

The 1953 St. Louis Browns season was the 53rd and final season in Browns history. The Browns finished 8th in the American League with a record of 54–100, 46 1/2 games behind the AL and World Series champion New York Yankees. After the season, the Browns moved to Baltimore, where they are now known as the Baltimore Orioles.

== Offseason ==
- October 14, 1952: Ray Coleman, Bob Mahoney, Stan Rojek and $95,000 were traded by the Browns to the Brooklyn Dodgers for Billy Hunter.
- October 16, 1952: Joe DeMaestri and Tommy Byrne were traded by the Browns to the White Sox for Hank Edwards and Willy Miranda.
- October 27, 1952: Jake Crawford was traded by the Browns to the Detroit Tigers for Neil Berry, Cliff Mapes and $25,000.
- December 4, 1952: Jay Porter, Owen Friend and Bob Nieman were traded by the Browns to the Detroit Tigers for Johnny Groth, Virgil Trucks and Hal White.

== Regular season ==
- May 6, 1953: In his first major league start, the Browns' Bobo Holloman pitched a no-hitter against the Philadelphia Athletics. The 27-year-old Holloman struck out three, walked five, and helped himself offensively by batting in three of the Browns' runs with a pair of singles in the Browns' 6–0 victory. (Holloman finished the season with a 3–7 record and did not pitch in the major leagues after 1953.)
- June 3 through July 7, 1953: The Browns lost twenty consecutive games at home. This remained the longest home losing streak (in terms of number of losses) in North American major professional sports until the Edmonton Elks lost their twenty-first game on July 29, 2023.
- September 27, 1953: The Browns ended their 51-year residence in St. Louis, losing to the Chicago White Sox at home 2–1 in 11 innings to complete a sweep by the White Sox, giving the Browns 100 losses for the year. Official attendance was 3,174.

=== Season standings ===
American League
Team	W	L	Pct.	GB	Home	Road
New York Yankees	99	52	.656	—	50‍–‍27	49‍–‍25
Cleveland Indians	92	62	.597	8½	53‍–‍24	39‍–‍38
Chicago White Sox	89	65	.578	11½	41‍–‍36	48‍–‍29
Boston Red Sox	84	69	.549	16	38‍–‍38	46‍–‍31
Washington Senators	76	76	.500	23½	39‍–‍36	37‍–‍40
Detroit Tigers	60	94	.390	40½	30‍–‍47	30‍–‍47
Philadelphia Athletics	59	95	.383	41½	27‍–‍50	32‍–‍45
St. Louis Browns	54	100	.351	46½	23‍–‍54	31‍–‍46

=== Record vs. opponents ===
1953 American League record Sources:
Team	BOS	CWS	CLE	DET	NYY	PHA	SLB	WSH
Boston	—	6–16	13–9	13–9	10–11	15–7	17–5	10–12
Chicago	16–6	—	11–11–1	14–8–1	9–13	10–12	17–5	12–10
Cleveland	9–13	11–11–1	—	14–8	11–11	19–3	17–5	11–11
Detroit	9–13	8–14–1	8–14	—	6–16	11–11–3	7–15	11–11
New York	11–10	13–9	11–11	16–6	—	17–5	17–5	14–6
Philadelphia	7–15	12–10	3–19	11–11–3	5–17	—	13–9	8–14
St. Louis	5–17	5–17	5–17	15–7	5–17	9–13	—	10–12
Washington	12–10	10–12	11–11	11–11	6–14	14–8	12–10	—

=== Notable transactions ===
- July 23, 1953: Bobo Holloman was purchased from the Browns by the Toronto Maple Leafs for $7,500.
- September 1, 1953: Neil Berry was selected off waivers from the Browns by the Chicago White Sox.

=== Roster ===
1953 St. Louis Browns
Roster
Pitchers: 23 Mike Blyzka; 31 Harry Brecheen; 33 Bob Cain; 35,39 Bob Habenicht; 24 Bobo Holloman; 22 Lou Kretlow; 5 Max Lanier; 27 Don Larsen; 18 Dick Littlefield; 29 Satchel Paige; 12,21 Duane Pillette; 26 Marlin Stuart; 23 Virgil Trucks; 24 Bob Turley; 25 Hal White	Catchers: 11 Clint Courtney; 32 Babe Martin; 10 Les Moss; Infielders: 34 Neil Berry; 40 Bob Elliott; 6 Billy Hunter; 2 Frank Kellert; 16 Dick Kryhoski; 34 Johnny Lipon; 4 Marty Marion; 9 Ed Mickelson; 1 Willy Miranda; 7 Roy Sievers; 40 Vern Stephens; 5 Bobby Young	Outfielders: 8 Jim Dyck; 15 Hank Edwards; 3 Johnny Groth; 19 Dick Kokos; 14 Don Lenhardt; -- Jim Pisoni; 20 Vic Wertz; Other batters: 36 Dixie Upright	Manager: 4 Marty Marion; Coaches: 31 Harry Brecheen; 32 Jim Crandall; 47 Bill Norman; 44 Bob Scheffing

== Player stats ==
=== Batting ===
= Indicates team leader

==== Starters by position ====
Note: Pos = Position; G = Games played; AB = At bats; H = Hits; Avg. = Batting average; HR = Home runs; RBI = Runs batted in

⌖	Player	G	AB	H	AVG	HR	RBI
C	Clint Courtney	106	355	89	.251	4	19
1B	Dick Kryhoski	104	338	94	.278	16	50
2B	Bobby Young	148	537	137	.255	4	25
SS	Billy Hunter	154	567	124	.219	1	37
3B	Jim Dyck	112	334	71	.213	9	27
OF	Vic Wertz	128	440	118	.268	19	70
OF	Dick Kokos	107	299	72	.241	13	38
OF	Johnny Groth	141	557	141	.253	10	57

==== Other batters ====
Note: G = Games played; AB = At bats; H = Hits; Avg. = Batting average; HR = Home runs; RBI = Runs batted in

Player	G	AB	H	AVG	HR	RBI
Don Lenhardt	97	303	96	.317	10	35
Roy Sievers	92	285	77	.270	8	35
Les Moss	78	239	66	.276	2	28
Vern Stephens	46	165	53	.321	4	17
Bob Elliott	48	160	40	.250	5	29
Hank Edwards	65	106	21	.198	0	9
Neil Berry	57	99	28	.283	0	11
Ed Mickelson	7	15	2	.133	0	2
Jim Pisoni	3	12	1	.083	1	1
Johnny Lipon	7	9	2	.222	0	1
Dixie Upright	9	8	2	.250	1	1
Marty Marion	3	7	0	.000	0	0
Willy Miranda	17	6	1	.167	0	0
Frank Kellert	2	4	0	.000	0	0
Babe Martin	4	2	0	.000	0	0

=== Pitching ===
==== Starting pitchers ====
Note: G = Games pitched; IP = Innings pitched; W = Wins; L = Losses; ERA = Earned run average; SO = Strikeouts

Player	G	IP	W	L	ERA	SO
Don Larsen	38	192.2	7	12	4.16	96
Duane Pillette	31	166.2	7	13	4.48	58
Virgil Trucks	16	88.0	5	4	3.07	47
Bob Turley	10	60.1	2	6	3.28	61
Dick Littlefield	36	152.1	7	12	5.08	104
Harry Brecheen	26	117.1	5	13	3.07	44
Bob Cain	32	99.2	4	10	6.23	36
Mike Blyzka	33	94.1	2	6	6.39	23
Lou Kretlow	22	81.0	1	5	5.11	37
Bobo Holloman	22	65.1	3	7	5.23	25
Max Lanier	10	22.1	0	1	7.25	8

==== Relief pitchers ====
Note: G = Games pitched; W = Wins; L = Losses; SV = Saves; ERA = Earned run average; SO = Strikeouts

Player	G	W	L	SV	ERA	SO
Marlin Stuart	60	8	2	6	3.94	46
Satchel Paige	57	3	9	11	3.53	51
Hal White	10	0	0	0	2.61	2
Bob Habenicht	1	0	0	0	5.40	1

== Awards and honors ==
1953 Major League Baseball All-Star Game

- Satchel Paige, reserve

Casey Stengel kept to his word and named Paige to the 1953 All-Star team despite Paige not having a very good year. He got in the game in the eighth inning. First Paige got Gil Hodges to line out, then after Roy Campanella singled up the middle, Eddie Mathews popped out. He then walked Duke Snider and Enos Slaughter lined a hit to center to score Campanella. National League pitcher Murry Dickson drove in Snider, but was thrown out at second base trying to stretch the hit into a double. Paige ended the year with a disappointing 3–9 record, but a respectable 3.53 ERA. Paige was released after the season when Veeck once again had to sell the team.

== Farm system ==
Level	Team	League	Manager
AA	San Antonio Missions	Texas League	Jim Crandall and Bill Norman
A	Wichita Indians	Western League	George Hausmann and Mark Christman
A	Lewiston Broncs	Western International League	Bill Brenner
B	York White Roses	Piedmont League	Mark Christman, Bill Enos and George Hausmann
B	Anderson Rebels	Tri-State League	Hillis Layne
C	Pine Bluff Judges	Cotton States League	Frank Lucchesi
C	Aberdeen Pheasants	Northern League	Barney Lutz
C	Pocatello Bannocks	Pioneer League	Hersh Martin and Butch Moran
C	Thetford Mines Mineurs	Provincial League	Bill Krueger
D	Wytheville Statesmen	Appalachian League	John O'Donnell
D	Valdosta Browns	Georgia–Florida League	Rollie Stuckney and Gil Torres
D	Ada Herefords	Sooner State League	Louis Brower
