= 1953 New York Yankees season =

Season for the Major League Baseball team the New York Yankees

1953 New York Yankees
- World Series champions American League champions
- League: American League
- Ballpark: Yankee Stadium
- City: New York City
- Record: 99–52 (.656)
- League place: 1st
- Owners: Dan Topping and Del Webb
- General managers: George Weiss
- Managers: Casey Stengel
- Television: WPIX
- Radio: WINS (AM) (Mel Allen, Jim Woods, Joe E. Brown)

The 1953 New York Yankees season was the 51st season for the team. The team finished with a record of 99–52, winning their 20th pennant, finishing 8.5 games ahead of the Cleveland Indians. New York was managed by Casey Stengel. The Yankees played their home games at Yankee Stadium. In the World Series, they defeated the Brooklyn Dodgers in 6 games. This was the Yankees fifth consecutive World Series win, a record that still stands.

== Regular season ==
=== Season standings ===
American League
Team	W	L	Pct.	GB	Home	Road
New York Yankees	99	52	.656	—	50‍–‍27	49‍–‍25
Cleveland Indians	92	62	.597	8½	53‍–‍24	39‍–‍38
Chicago White Sox	89	65	.578	11½	41‍–‍36	48‍–‍29
Boston Red Sox	84	69	.549	16	38‍–‍38	46‍–‍31
Washington Senators	76	76	.500	23½	39‍–‍36	37‍–‍40
Detroit Tigers	60	94	.390	40½	30‍–‍47	30‍–‍47
Philadelphia Athletics	59	95	.383	41½	27‍–‍50	32‍–‍45
St. Louis Browns	54	100	.351	46½	23‍–‍54	31‍–‍46

=== Record vs. opponents ===
1953 American League record Sources:
Team	BOS	CWS	CLE	DET	NYY	PHA	SLB	WSH
Boston	—	6–16	13–9	13–9	10–11	15–7	17–5	10–12
Chicago	16–6	—	11–11–1	14–8–1	9–13	10–12	17–5	12–10
Cleveland	9–13	11–11–1	—	14–8	11–11	19–3	17–5	11–11
Detroit	9–13	8–14–1	8–14	—	6–16	11–11–3	7–15	11–11
New York	11–10	13–9	11–11	16–6	—	17–5	17–5	14–6
Philadelphia	7–15	12–10	3–19	11–11–3	5–17	—	13–9	8–14
St. Louis	5–17	5–17	5–17	15–7	5–17	9–13	—	10–12
Washington	12–10	10–12	11–11	11–11	6–14	14–8	12–10	—

=== Roster ===
1953 New York Yankees
Roster
Pitchers: 40 Ewell Blackwell; 16 Whitey Ford; 24 Tom Gorman; 35 Steve Kraly; 21 Bob Kuzava; 30 Eddie Lopat; 18 Jim McDonald; 23 Bill Miller; 17 Vic Raschi; 22 Allie Reynolds; 11 Johnny Sain; 19 Ray Scarborough; 20,38 Art Schallock; 35 Johnny Schmitz	Catchers: 8 Yogi Berra; 32 Ralph Houk; 29 Charlie Silvera; Infielders: 38 Loren Babe; 45 Don Bollweg; 27 Jim Brideweser; 6 Andy Carey; 42 Jerry Coleman; 15 Joe Collins; 1 Billy Martin; 12 Gil McDougald; 20 Willy Miranda; 36 Johnny Mize; 10 Phil Rizzuto; 26 Gus Triandos; 44 Frank Verdi	Outfielders: 9 Hank Bauer; 7 Mickey Mantle; 25 Irv Noren; 28 Bill Renna; 14 Gene Woodling; Other batters: 41 Bob Cerv; 43 Art Schult	Manager: 37 Casey Stengel; Coaches: 2 Frankie Crosetti; 33 Bill Dickey; 32 Ralph Houk; 31 Jim Turner

== Player stats ==
= Indicates team leader

=== Batting ===
==== Starters by position ====
Note: Pos = Position; G = Games played; AB = At bats; H = Hits; Avg. = Batting average; HR = Home runs; RBI = Runs batted in

Pos	Player	G	AB	H	Avg.	HR	RBI
C	Yogi Berra	137	503	149	.296	27	108
1B	Joe Collins	127	387	104	.269	17	44
2B	Billy Martin	149	587	151	.257	15	75
3B	Gil McDougald	141	581	154	.285	10	83
SS	Phil Rizzuto	134	413	112	.271	2	54
OF	Gene Woodling	125	395	121	.306	10	58
OF	Hank Bauer	133	437	133	.304	10	57
OF	Mickey Mantle	127	461	136	.295	21	92

==== Other batters ====
Note: G = Games played; AB = At bats; H = Hits; Avg. = Batting average; HR = Home runs; RBI = Runs batted in

Player	G	AB	H	Avg.	HR	RBI
Johnny Mize	81	104	26	.250	4	27
Charlie Silvera	42	82	23	.280	0	12
Andy Carey	51	81	26	.321	4	8
Willy Miranda	48	58	13	.224	1	5
Gus Triandos	18	51	8	.157	1	6
Loren Babe	5	18	6	.333	2	6
Jerry Coleman	8	10	2	.200	0	0
Ralph Houk	8	9	2	.333	0	1
Bob Cerv	8	6	0	.000	0	0
Jim Brideweser	7	3	3	1.000	0	3
Art Schult	7	0	0	----	0	0
Frank Verdi	1	0	0	----	0	0

=== Pitching ===
==== Starting pitchers ====
Note: G = Games pitched; IP = Innings pitched; W = Wins; L = Losses; ERA = Earned run average; SO = Strikeouts

Player	G	IP	W	L	ERA	SO
Whitey Ford	32	207.0	18	6	3.00	110
Vic Raschi	28	181.0	13	6	3.33	76
Ed Lopat	25	178.1	16	4	2.42	50
Jim McDonald	27	129.2	9	7	3.82	43

==== Other pitchers ====
Note: G = Games pitched; IP = Innings pitched; W = Wins; L = Losses; ERA = Earned run average; SO = Strikeouts

Player	G	IP	W	L	ERA	SO
Johnny Sain	40	189.0	14	7	3.00	84
Allie Reynolds	41	145.0	13	7	3.41	86
Bob Kuzava	33	92.1	6	5	3.31	48
Bill Miller	13	34.0	2	1	4.76	17
Steve Kraly	5	25.0	0	2	3.24	8
Ewell Blackwell	8	19.2	2	0	3.66	11

==== Relief pitchers ====
Note: G = Games pitched; W = Wins; L = Losses; SV = Saves; ERA = Earned run average; SO = Strikeouts

Player	G	W	L	SV	ERA	SO
Tom Gorman	40	4	5	6	3.39	38
Ray Scarborough	25	2	2	0	3.29	20
Art Schallock	7	0	0	1	2.95	13
Johnny Schmitz	3	0	0	1	2.08	0

== 1953 World Series ==
AL New York Yankees (4) vs. NL Brooklyn Dodgers (2)

Game	Score	Date	Location	Attendance
1	Dodgers – 5, Yankees – 9	September 30	Yankee Stadium	69,374
2	Dodgers – 2, Yankees – 4	October 1	Yankee Stadium	66,786
3	Yankees – 2, Dodgers – 3	October 2	Ebbets Field	35,270
4	Yankees – 3, Dodgers – 7	October 3	Ebbets Field	36,775
5	Yankees – 11, Dodgers – 7	October 4	Ebbets Field	36,775
6	Dodgers – 3, Yankees – 4	October 5	Yankee Stadium	62,370

== Awards and honors ==
- Billy Martin, Babe Ruth Award
- Yogi Berra, Runner-up, American League MVP

All-Star Game

- Hank Bauer - Starter
- Yogi Berra - Starter
- Mickey Mantle - Starter

== Farm system ==
Level	Team	League	Manager
AAA	Kansas City Blues	American Association	Harry Craft
AA	Birmingham Barons	Southern Association	Mayo Smith
A	Binghamton Triplets	Eastern League	Phil Page
B	Quincy Gems	Illinois–Indiana–Iowa League	Vern Hoscheit
B	Norfolk Tars	Piedmont League	Mickey Owen
C	Boise Yankees	Pioneer League	Tedd Gullic
C	Joplin Miners	Western Association	Bunny Mick
D	Owensboro Oilers	KITTY League	Marvin Crater
D	Olean Yankees	PONY League	Bill Davis and Walter Lance
D	McAlester Rockets	Sooner State League	Bill Cope

LEAGUE CHAMPIONS: Kansas City, Binghamton, Quincy, Norfolk, McAlester
