= 1953 Detroit Tigers season =

Major League Baseball season

1953 Detroit Tigers
- League: American League
- Ballpark: Briggs Stadium
- City: Detroit, Michigan
- Record: 60–94 (.390)
- League place: 6th
- Owners: Walter Briggs, Jr.
- General managers: Charlie Gehringer
- Managers: Fred Hutchinson
- Television: WWJ-TV
- Radio: WJBK/WXYZ (Van Patrick, Dizzy Trout)

The 1953 Detroit Tigers season was the franchise's 54th. The team finished sixth in the American League with a record of 60–94, 40 1/2 games behind the New York Yankees.

The team has the dubious distinction of having surrendered a 17-run inning — the most runs scored in a single inning in the Modern Era — in a 23–3 loss to the Boston Red Sox.

== Offseason ==
- October 27, 1952: Neil Berry, Cliff Mapes and $25,000 were traded by the Tigers to the St. Louis Browns for Jake Crawford.
- December 4, 1952: Johnny Groth, Virgil Trucks and Hal White were traded by the Tigers to the St. Louis Browns for Jay Porter, Owen Friend and Bob Nieman.
- Prior to 1953 season: Bob Shaw was signed as an amateur free agent by the Tigers.

== Regular season ==
=== Season standings ===
American League
Team	W	L	Pct.	GB	Home	Road
New York Yankees	99	52	.656	—	50‍–‍27	49‍–‍25
Cleveland Indians	92	62	.597	8½	53‍–‍24	39‍–‍38
Chicago White Sox	89	65	.578	11½	41‍–‍36	48‍–‍29
Boston Red Sox	84	69	.549	16	38‍–‍38	46‍–‍31
Washington Senators	76	76	.500	23½	39‍–‍36	37‍–‍40
Detroit Tigers	60	94	.390	40½	30‍–‍47	30‍–‍47
Philadelphia Athletics	59	95	.383	41½	27‍–‍50	32‍–‍45
St. Louis Browns	54	100	.351	46½	23‍–‍54	31‍–‍46

=== Record vs. opponents ===
1953 American League record Sources:
Team	BOS	CWS	CLE	DET	NYY	PHA	SLB	WSH
Boston	—	6–16	13–9	13–9	10–11	15–7	17–5	10–12
Chicago	16–6	—	11–11–1	14–8–1	9–13	10–12	17–5	12–10
Cleveland	9–13	11–11–1	—	14–8	11–11	19–3	17–5	11–11
Detroit	9–13	8–14–1	8–14	—	6–16	11–11–3	7–15	11–11
New York	11–10	13–9	11–11	16–6	—	17–5	17–5	14–6
Philadelphia	7–15	12–10	3–19	11–11–3	5–17	—	13–9	8–14
St. Louis	5–17	5–17	5–17	15–7	5–17	9–13	—	10–12
Washington	12–10	10–12	11–11	11–11	6–14	14–8	12–10	—

=== Notable transactions ===
- June 15, 1953: Art Houtteman, Owen Friend, Bill Wight, and Joe Ginsberg were traded by the Tigers to the Cleveland Indians for Ray Boone, Al Aber, Steve Gromek, and Dick Weik.
- July 27, 1953: Hal Newhouser was released by the Tigers.

=== Roster ===
1953 Detroit Tigers
Roster
Pitchers: 2 Al Aber; 16,35 Ralph Branca; 27 Hal Erickson; 21 Paul Foytack; 31 Ned Garver; 34 Ted Gray; 18 Steve Gromek; 35,39 Earl Harrist; 20 Ray Herbert; 44 Billy Hoeft; 21 Art Houtteman; 29 Fred Hutchinson; 35 Milt Jordan; 14 Dave Madison; 37 Dick Marlowe; 28 Bob Miller; 16 Hal Newhouser; 19 Ray Scarborough; 21 Dick Weik; 18 Bill Wight	Catchers: 10 Matt Batts; 32 Johnny Bucha; 2 Joe Ginsberg; 9 Bob Swift; Infielders: 38 John Baumgartner; 2 Reno Bertoia; 8 Ray Boone; 3 Walt Dropo; 8 Owen Friend; 1 Fred Hatfield; 17 Billy Hitchcock; 26 Harvey Kuenn; 7 Johnny Pesky; 4 Jerry Priddy	Outfielders: 22 Frank Carswell; 24 Jim Delsing; 6,25 Al Kaline; 30 Don Lund; 6 Pat Mullin; 5 Bob Nieman; 12 Steve Souchock; 19 Russ Sullivan; Other batters: 15 George Freese	Manager: 29 Fred Hutchinson; Coaches: 36 Rick Ferrell; 33 Ted Lyons; 9 Bob Swift

== Player stats ==
=== Batting ===
==== Starters by position ====
Note: Pos = Position; G = Games played; AB = At bats; H = Hits; Avg. = Batting average; HR = Home runs; RBI = Runs batted in

Pos	Player	G	AB	H	Avg.	HR	RBI
C	Matt Batts	116	374	104	.278	6	42
1B	Walt Dropo	152	606	150	.248	13	96
2B	Johnny Pesky	103	308	90	.292	2	24
SS	Harvey Kuenn	155	679	209	.308	2	48
3B	Ray Boone	101	385	120	.312	22	93
OF	Bob Nieman	142	508	143	.281	15	69
OF	Jim Delsing	138	479	138	.288	11	62
OF	Don Lund	131	421	108	.257	9	47

==== Other batters ====
Note: G = Games played; AB = At bats; H = Hits; Avg. = Batting average; HR = Home runs; RBI = Runs batted in

Player	G	AB	H	Avg.	HR	RBI
Fred Hatfield	109	311	79	.254	3	19
Bud Souchock	89	278	84	.302	11	46
Jerry Priddy	65	196	46	.235	1	24
Johnny Bucha	60	158	35	.222	1	14
Pat Mullin	79	97	26	.268	4	17
Owen Friend	31	96	17	.177	3	10
Russ Sullivan	23	72	18	.250	1	6
Joe Ginsberg	18	53	16	.302	0	3
Billy Hitchcock	22	38	8	.211	0	0
Al Kaline	30	28	7	.250	1	2
John Baumgartner	7	27	5	.185	0	2
Frank Carswell	16	15	4	.267	0	2
Bob Swift	2	3	1	.333	0	1
George Freese	1	1	0	.000	0	0
Reno Bertoia	1	1	0	.000	0	0

=== Pitching ===
==== Starting pitchers ====
Note: G = Games pitched; IP = Innings pitched; W = Wins; L = Losses; ERA = Earned run average; SO = Strikeouts

Player	G	IP	W	L	ERA	SO
Ned Garver	30	198.1	11	11	4.45	69
Billy Hoeft	29	197.2	9	14	4.83	90
Ted Gray	30	176.0	10	15	4.60	115
Steve Gromek	19	125.2	6	8	4.51	59
Ralph Branca	17	102.0	4	7	4.15	50

==== Other pitchers ====
Note: G = Games pitched; IP = Innings pitched; W = Wins; L = Losses; ERA = Earned run average; SO = Strikeouts

Player	G	IP	W	L	ERA	SO
Dick Marlowe	42	119.2	6	7	5.26	52
Art Houtteman	16	68.2	2	6	5.90	28
Al Aber	17	66.2	4	3	4.46	34
Bill Wight	13	25.1	0	3	8.88	10
Hal Newhouser	7	21.2	0	1	7.06	6
Earl Harrist	8	18.2	0	2	8.68	7
Milt Jordan	8	17.0	0	1	5.82	4

==== Relief pitchers ====
Note: G = Games pitched; W = Wins; L = Losses; SV = Saves; ERA = Earned run average; SO = Strikeouts

Player	G	W	L	SV	ERA	SO
Ray Herbert	43	4	6	6	5.24	37
Dave Madison	32	3	4	0	6.82	27
Hal Erickson	18	0	1	1	4.73	19
Bob Miller	13	1	2	0	5.94	9
Ray Scarborough	13	0	2	2	8.27	12
Dick Weik	12	0	1	0	13.97	6
Paul Foytack	6	0	0	0	11.17	7
Fred Hutchinson	3	0	0	0	2.79	4

== Farm system ==
Level	Team	League	Manager
AAA	Buffalo Bisons	International League	Jack Tighe
AA	Little Rock Travelers	Southern Association	Paul Campbell
A	Montgomery Grays	Sally League	Charlie Metro
B	Durham Bulls	Carolina League	Marv Owen
C	Bakersfield Indians	California League	Ray Perry
C	Jackson Senators	Cotton States League	Marland Doolittle
D	Jamestown Falcons	PONY League	Dan Carnevale
D	Wausau Timberjacks	Wisconsin State League	Wayne Blackburn

LEAGUE CHAMPIONS: Jamestown
