= Frank Fanovich =

American baseball player (1923–2011)

- Pitcher
- Born: January 11, 1923; New York, New York, U.S.
- Died: August 27, 2011 (aged 88); New Smyrna Beach, Florida, U.S.
- Batted: Left Threw: Left

MLB debut
- April 25, 1949, for the Cincinnati Reds

Last MLB appearance
- September 16, 1953, for the Philadelphia Athletics

MLB statistics
- Win–loss record: 0–5
- Earned run average: 5.49
- Strikeouts: 64
- Stats at Baseball Reference

Teams
- Cincinnati Reds (1949); Philadelphia Athletics (1953)

Frank Joseph "Lefty" Fanovich (January 11, 1923 – August 27, 2011) was an American Major League Baseball pitcher. The left-hander played for the Cincinnati Reds during the 1949 season and the Philadelphia Athletics during the 1953 season. He was acquired along with Joe Coleman by the Baltimore Orioles from the Athletics for Bob Cain on 17 December 1953. During his MLB career, the 5 ft 11 in (1.80 m), 180 lb (82 kg) Fanovich appeared in 55 games, 51 in relief, and posted a career record of 0–5. He allowed 106 hits in 105 innings pitched, with 65 bases on balls and 64 strikeouts.
