= John Baumgartner =

American baseball player (1931–2024)

- Third baseman
- Born: May 29, 1931; Birmingham, Alabama, U.S.
- Died: September 25, 2024 (aged 93); Birmingham, Alabama, U.S.
- Batted: Right Threw: Right

MLB debut
- April 14, 1953, for the Detroit Tigers

Last MLB appearance
- April 21, 1953, for the Detroit Tigers

MLB statistics
- Batting average: .185
- Home runs: 0
- Runs batted in: 2
- Stats at Baseball Reference

Teams
- Detroit Tigers (1953)

John Edward Baumgartner (May 29, 1931 – September 25, 2024) was an American professional baseball player.

Baumgartner appeared in seven Major League Baseball games as a member of the 1953 Detroit Tigers and played six seasons (1950–1955) in minor league baseball. While he played third base exclusively in MLB, he also was an outfielder and first baseman in the minor leagues. Baumgartner threw and batted right-handed, stood 6 feet 1 inch (1.85 m) tall and weighed 190 pounds (86 kg).

Baumgartner played college baseball at the University of Alabama, which qualified for the 1950 College World Series led by Baumgartner and other future big leaguers such as longtime MLB pitchers Frank Lary and Al Worthington. Baumgartner signed with Detroit in 1950 and made the Tigers 1953 roster coming out of spring training. He started the first seven games of the regular season at third base for Detroit, collecting five hits (all singles) in 27 at bats and scoring three runs. In the field, he made two errors in 23 total chances for a fielding percentage of .913. Those would be Baumgartner's only games played in the Majors; he was sent back to the minors, and Ray Boone was eventually acquired from the Cleveland Indians to play the hot corner for Detroit. In 657 minor league games, Baumgartner batted .261 with 624 hits.

In Charlie Metro's autobiography, he wrote this of his former player: "John Baumgartner played third base for me at Montgomery in 1953. He was a fine physical specimen. But he was like some ballplayers who just had a quirk, and I never knew how to overcome it. They just couldn't meet the big league challenge, but he was a big league prospect. He had power, good speed, a good arm, everything...."

Baumgartner died in Birmingham, Alabama, on September 25, 2024, at the age of 93.
