= Joe Coleman (baseball, born 1922) =

American baseball player (1922–1997)

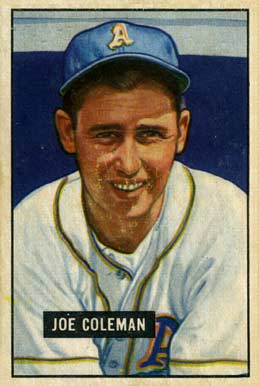
- Pitcher
- Born: July 30, 1922; Medford, Massachusetts, U.S.
- Died: April 9, 1997 (aged 74); Fort Myers, Florida, U.S.
- Batted: Right Threw: Right

MLB debut
- September 19, 1942, for the Philadelphia Athletics

Last MLB appearance
- September 7, 1955, for the Detroit Tigers

MLB statistics
- Win–loss record: 52–76
- Earned run average: 4.38
- Strikeouts: 444
- Stats at Baseball Reference

Teams
- Philadelphia Athletics (1942, 1946–1951, 1953); Baltimore Orioles (1954–1955); Detroit Tigers (1955)

Career highlights and awards
- All-Star (1948)

Joseph Patrick Coleman (July 30, 1922 – April 9, 1997) was an American professional baseball pitcher who appeared in 223 games in Major League Baseball (MLB) over ten seasons between 1942 and 1955 for the Philadelphia Athletics, Baltimore Orioles, and Detroit Tigers. He was named an All-Star in 1948 and finished 19th in MVP voting in 1954. He was the father of Joe Coleman, a major league pitcher for 15 seasons from 1965 to 1979 and a two-time 20-game winner, and the grandfather of Casey Coleman, a pitcher with the Chicago Cubs and the Kansas City Royals from 2010 and 2014.

== Career ==
A native of Medford, Massachusetts, Coleman attended Malden Catholic High School, where he was coached by Brother Gilbert Mathias, who had mentored Babe Ruth as a youth in Baltimore. In 1940, Mathias introduced Coleman to Ruth, who was visiting the school. After watching Coleman pitch, Ruth took him aside and helped him throw a more effective curveball.

Coleman missed the 1943–1945 seasons while serving in the United States Navy during World War II. Along with other notable major league baseball players including Ted Williams and Johnny Pesky, Coleman enlisted in the Navy's Aviation Cadet Training Program located on the University of North Carolina at Chapel Hill campus.

Coleman was acquired along with Frank Fanovich by the Orioles from the Athletics for Bob Cain on 17 December 1953. He finished 19th in voting for the 1954 American League Most Valuable Player Award for having a 13–17 win–loss record, in 33 games with 15 complete games, 4 shutouts, 221 1/3 innings pitched, 103 strikeouts, and a 3.50 ERA for the Baltimore Orioles.

In 10 seasons, he had a 52–76 win–loss record and 6 saves in 223 games, 140 of them starts, 60 complete games, 11 shutouts, 55 games finished, 1,134 innings pitched, 566 walks allowed, 444 strikeouts, and a 4.38 ERA.

== Death ==
Coleman died in Fort Myers, Florida, at the age of 74 in 1997.

== See also ==
- Third-generation Major League Baseball families
