= Dick Aylward =

American baseball player (1925–1983)

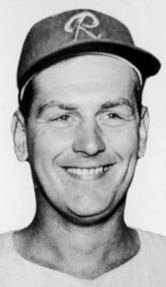
- Aylward with the Seattle Rainiers (PCL) in 1957
- Catcher
- Born: June 4, 1925; Baltimore, Maryland, U.S.
- Died: June 11, 1983 (aged 58); Spring Valley, California, U.S.
- Batted: Right Threw: Right

MLB debut
- May 1, 1953, for the Cleveland Indians

Last MLB appearance
- May 20, 1953, for the Cleveland Indians

MLB statistics
- Batting average: .000
- At-bats: 3
- Stats at Baseball Reference

Teams
- Cleveland Indians (1953)

Richard John Aylward (June 4, 1925 – June 11, 1983) was an American professional baseball player. The catcher, a native of Baltimore, Maryland, appeared in four games in Major League Baseball for the Cleveland Indians during the 1953 season, although his professional playing career lasted 14 years and 1,148 games in minor league baseball.

Aylward, who batted and threw right-handed, was listed as 6 feet (1.8 m) tall and 190 pounds (86 kg). After his first pro season in 1943, he joined the United States Army and served in the European Theater of Operations during World War II. He resumed his baseball career in 1946 in the Chicago Cubs' farm system, and was eventually acquired by the Indians' organization in 1951. After hitting a career-high .285 in the Double-A Texas League in 1952, he received his MLB trial with Cleveland the following spring.

Aylward's four big-league games during May 1953 all occurred as a mid-game replacement for regular catcher Jim Hegan in lopsided Cleveland defeats. All told, he played ten innings in the field and handled ten chances without an error. His three MLB at bats came in one game, May 5 against the New York Yankees at Cleveland Municipal Stadium. After the Yankees jumped out to an 8–0 lead in their half of the fourth inning, Aylward came into the game. He grounded out twice against Whitey Ford, then struck out in the ninth inning against relief pitcher Tom Gorman. After playing in his final big-league game on May 20, Aylward spent the rest of the campaign with the Triple-A Indianapolis Indians. His minor league career then extended into 1958.
