= Tom Giordano =

American baseball player, scout, and executive (1925–2019)

- Second baseman
- Born: October 9, 1925; Newark, New Jersey, U.S.
- Died: February 14, 2019 (aged 93); Orlando, Florida, U.S.
- Batted: Right Threw: Right

MLB debut
- September 11, 1953, for the Philadelphia Athletics

Last MLB appearance
- September 26, 1953, for the Philadelphia Athletics

MLB statistics
- Batting average: .175
- Home runs: 2
- Runs batted in: 5
- Stats at Baseball Reference

Teams
- Philadelphia Athletics (1953)

Thomas Arthur Giordano (October 9, 1925 – February 14, 2019) was an American professional baseball player, scout, front-office executive and minor-league player-manager. In 2018, at age 92 and in his 71st season in organized baseball, he worked as a scout and special assistant to the general manager of the Atlanta Braves. He was an infielder during his 12-year active playing career (1948–59), and appeared in 11 games in Major League Baseball for the 1953 Philadelphia Athletics.

As scouting and player development director of the Baltimore Orioles (1976–87) he drafted Hall of Fame shortstop Cal Ripken Jr., and signed and developed other players who would help Baltimore win the 1983 World Series.

== Biography ==
Giordano was born in Newark, New Jersey. Nicknamed "T-Bone", as a player he stood 6 feet (1.8 metres) tall and weighed 175 pounds (79 kg) and threw and batted right-handed. Apart from his 11-game trial with the 1953 Athletics, when he batted .175 with seven hits (four for extra bases), he spent his entire uniformed career in the minors. In 1956 he became a playing manager for the Milwaukee Braves' organization, then returned to the Athletics (based by then in Kansas City) two years later as a minor league manager. In 1960 Giordano became a scout, working for the Athletics, Cincinnati Reds, Cleveland Indians, Seattle Pilots/Milwaukee Brewers and the Orioles. He was a longtime associate of late Orioles and Indians executive Hank Peters and former Braves' president, baseball operations John Hart.

From 1976 he was a senior scouting or player development executive or assistant to the general manager for the Orioles, Indians (1987–2000) and Texas Rangers (2001–15). He was named Major League Baseball's East Coast Scout of the Year in 2007 in a vote of his peers. Giordano died on February 14, 2019, at the age of 93.
