= Saul Rogovin =

American baseball player (1922–1995)

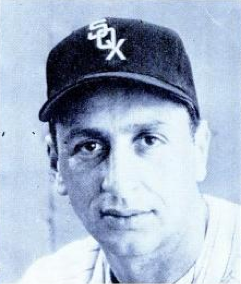
- Rogovin in 1953
- Pitcher
- Born: March 24, 1922; Brooklyn, New York, U.S.
- Died: January 23, 1995 (aged 72); New York City, New York, U.S.
- Batted: Right Threw: Right

MLB debut
- April 28, 1949, for the Detroit Tigers

Last MLB appearance
- June 19, 1957, for the Philadelphia Phillies

MLB statistics
- Win–loss record: 48–48
- Earned run average: 4.06
- Strikeouts: 388
- Stats at Baseball Reference

Teams
- Detroit Tigers (1949–1951); Chicago White Sox (1951–1953); Baltimore Orioles (1955); Philadelphia Phillies (1955–1957)

Career highlights and awards
- AL ERA leader (1951)

Saul Walter Rogovin (March 24, 1922 – January 23, 1995) was an American professional baseball player.

Rogovin was a pitcher over parts of 8 seasons (1949–57), with the Detroit Tigers, Chicago White Sox, Baltimore Orioles, and Philadelphia Phillies. In 1951, he led the American League with a 2.78 ERA. For his major league career, he compiled a 48–48 record in 150 appearances, with a 4.06 ERA, 10 shutouts, and 388 strikeouts.

== Early and personal life ==
Rogovin was born in Brooklyn, New York, and was Jewish. His parents were Jacob and Bessie Rogovin.

He played infield at Abraham Lincoln High School. He tried out for the Brooklyn Dodgers, but was not signed.

He married Doreen Lipsit at Rodeph Shalom synagogue in New York on January 30, 1955.

== Minor league career ==
Rogovin played Class D ball in Beaver Falls, Pennsylvania for the Beaver Falls Bees for $60 a month in 1941. Umpire Dolly Stark saw Rogovin play for a corporate team in 1941 and got him a tryout with the Giants. He played for a short time with their Jersey City Giants affiliate in Jersey City before his contract was sold to the Chattanooga Lookouts. It was their coach, Red Lucas, who put Rogovin in as a pitcher. He pitched a shutout game against the Birmingham Barons to close the 1945 season. He also played for the Pensacola Fliers and Buffalo Bisons (for whom he was 13-7 in 1948, and 16-6 in 1949).

== Major league career ==
Before the 1944 season, Rogovin signed as a free agent with the Washington Senators.

Prior to the start of the 1947 season, he was sent by the Senators to the Detroit Tigers. He made his debut in April 1949 at the age of 27.

During spring training in 1950, he began to experience some soreness in his pitching arm. That year Rogovin was 2–1 with a 4.50 ERA while pitching in 11 games. He hit a grand slam off Eddie Lopat of the New York Yankees.

On May 15, 1951, he was traded by the Tigers to the Chicago White Sox for Bob Cain. He led the American League with a 2.78 ERA in 1951, while playing for Detroit and Chicago. He was 4th in the league in hits allowed per 9 IP (7.85), and 5th in complete games (17) and shutouts (3). He had 12 wins and eight losses that year, with seven losses by one run and one by two runs. He at times fell asleep on the bench; according to a later article in The Washington Post, he suffered from a sleep disorder.

In 1952 he was 14-9 and had a .609 win–loss percentage and struck out 14 Red Sox players in a 15-inning game. He was 7th in the league in innings (231.7; a career high), 8th in shutouts (3), 9th in games started (30) and wins (14), and 10th in strikeouts (121). He came in 27th in MVP voting.

On December 10, 1953, he was traded by the White Sox with Rocky Krsnich and Connie Ryan to the Cincinnati Reds for Willard Marshall. In 1954, he pitched for the Havana Sugar Kings, going 8-8 with a 3.71 ERA. In December 1954 he was sent from the Cincinnati Redlegs to the Baltimore Orioles.

On July 9, 1955, he was released by the Orioles and signed as a free agent with the Philadelphia Phillies, where he had an ERA of 3.08 and a 5–3 win–loss record. Rogovin said: "Somebody cracked that I now throw with three speeds 'slow, slower and stop.' But who cares, as long as I'm winning? They can have the fastball." He played his last major league game in June 1957, at 35 years of age, retiring due to a sore arm.

Through 2010, he was 10th all-time in career wins (directly behind Larry Sherry) among Jewish major league baseball players.

== After baseball ==
After baseball, Rogovin became a liquor salesman. He said "Being out of baseball hurt me inside, hurt me so bad that I couldn't go to a game for years. I wanted to go visit my old team, keep up my baseball contacts, but I couldn't."

He then decided to resume the college studies he had begun more than 30 years earlier. He was 51 years old when he started studying for a degree in Education at Manhattan Community College. Upon his submission of his application to Manhattan Community College, he was told by a dean that, regardless of his age, he would be required to take a physical education course. In response, he pulled out a bubble-gum card with his picture on it, and asked if his Major League career would fulfill the physical education requirement. The dean decided that would be fine.

He transferred to and graduated from City College, with a degree in English literature.

He then began teaching English and literature in the New York City high schools at age 56. He taught first at Hughes High School in New York, and then at Eastern District High School in Brooklyn the last eight years of his teaching career.

He died on January 23, 1995, at the age of 71 from bone cancer, and is buried at Beth David Cemetery in Elmont, New York.

== See also ==
- List of Jewish Major League Baseball players
- List of Major League Baseball annual ERA leaders
