= John Mackinson =

American baseball player (1923–1989)

- Pitcher
- Born: October 29, 1923; Orange, New Jersey, U.S.
- Died: October 17, 1989 (aged 65); Reseda, California, U.S.
- Batted: Right Threw: Right

MLB debut
- April 16, 1953, for the Philadelphia Athletics

Last MLB appearance
- September 19, 1955, for the St. Louis Cardinals

MLB statistics
- Win–loss record: 0–1
- Earned run average: 7.36
- Innings pitched: 22
- Stats at Baseball Reference

Teams
- Philadelphia Athletics (1953); St. Louis Cardinals (1955)

John Joseph Mackinson (October 29, 1923 – October 17, 1989) was an American professional baseball pitcher who appeared in ten games (nine as a pitcher) in the major leagues (MLB) for the 1953 Philadelphia Athletics and 1955 St. Louis Cardinals. His pro career lasted 13 seasons (1946–1958).

Born in Orange, New Jersey, Mackinson threw and batted right-handed, and was listed as 5 feet 10 inches (1.78 m) tall and 160 pounds (73 kg). He served in the United States Army during World War II. He spent seven years in the New York Yankees' farm system before his acquisition by Philadelphia in 1953. In his only appearance in an Athletics' uniform, Mackinson threw 11/3 scoreless innings in relief against the Boston Red Sox on April 16, 1953; the only hit he surrendered was a single to future Baseball Hall of Famer George Kell.

Released by the Athletics' organization in May 1955, Mackinson was signed by the Cardinals and was recalled from Triple-A to pitch in eight games between August 17 and September 2. That stretch afforded Mackinson his only MLB decision (a defeat in relief at the hands of the Cincinnati Redlegs on August 20) and starting assignment (on August 25 against the Philadelphia Phillies; staked to a 4–0 lead in the top of the first inning, he couldn't get out of the bottom of the frame and exited after securing only one out). In his final big-league game on September 19, Mackinson pinch-ran for future Hall of Famed Stan Musial in the ninth inning of a tie game at Busch Stadium; he failed to score a run, but the Redbirds won in extra innings.

Mackinson returned to the minors in 1956 and played three more seasons. He died at age 65 in the Los Angeles suburb of Reseda on October 17, 1989.
