= Neil Berry (baseball) =

American baseball player (1922–2016)

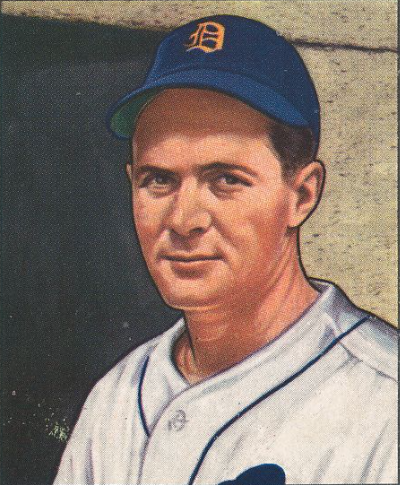
- Neil Berry, 1950 Bowman card
- Shortstop, Second baseman
- Born: January 11, 1922; Kalamazoo, Michigan, U.S.
- Died: August 24, 2016 (aged 94); Kalamazoo, Michigan, U.S.
- Batted: Right Threw: Right

MLB debut
- April 20, 1948, for the Detroit Tigers

Last MLB appearance
- May 11, 1954, for the Baltimore Orioles

MLB statistics
- Batting average: .244
- Hits: 265
- Runs batted in: 74
- Stats at Baseball Reference

Teams
- Detroit Tigers (1948–1952); St. Louis Browns (1953); Chicago White Sox (1953); Baltimore Orioles (1954)

Neil Berry (January 11, 1922 – August 24, 2016), sometimes listed as Cornelius John Berry, and in other sources as Neil John Berry, was an American Major League Baseball infielder who played seven seasons in the American League with the Detroit Tigers (1948–1952), St. Louis Browns (1953), Chicago White Sox (1953), and Baltimore Orioles (1954).

== Early years ==
Berry was born in 1922 in Kalamazoo, Michigan. He attended Kalamazoo Central High School where he played football and baseball. In 1938, at age 16, he was a triple-threat halfback who led Kalamazoo to a conference championship, scored 12 touchdowns, and was selected as captain of the all-state football team. He also played basketball for Kalamazoo Central and was a member of the school's 1937 state championship team.

Berry also played American Legion junior baseball as a shortstop, hitting .529 at age 17 in 1939. He enrolled at Western State Teachers College (now Western Michigan University) in the fall of 1940. He left the school after only one year.

== Professional baseball ==
=== Winston-Salem (1942) ===
Berry was signed by Wish Egan for the Detroit Tigers in November 1941. He was assigned to the Winston-Salem Twins where he played shortstop and appeared in 135 games during the 1942 season, compiling a .231 batting average. He was rated the best-fielding shortstop in the Piedmont League, selected to the Piedmont League all-star team, and voted the most popular player on the Winston-Salem team.

=== Military service (1943-1945) ===
He missed the 1943, 1944, and 1945 seasons of military service. He spent 42 months in the Army Air Force during World War II. He was assigned as a physical training instructor in Texas and later trained as a gunner on a B29. He received orderss to deploy overseas, but the order was cancelled by Berry's commanding officer, and Berry never left the United States.

=== Buffalo Bisons (1946-1947) ===
After the war, he spent the 1946 and 1947 seasons with the Buffalo Bisons, Detroit's affiliate in the International League. He was regarded as "one of the best defensive shortstops and fastest infielders in the International League." He compiled a .299 batting average with 50 RBIs for the Bisons in 1947.

=== 1948 season ===
Berry attended spring training with the Detroit Tigers in 1948 and made it to the major leagues in 1948, compiling a .500 batting average through April 6 -- more than 100 points above any other Detroit player. Manager Steve O'Neill called Berry "the most pleasant surprise of the spring" and added:

That boy has everything doesn't he? I like the way he can cover ground in the field. I also like the way he can tear around the bases. I don't know if he's the speediest on the team, but he sure looks like it.

Berry made his major-league debut on April 20, 1948, as the Tigers' starting shortstop, tallying his first major-league hit in the ninth inning and driving in a run. Berry ultimately lost the starting shortstop job to Johnny Lipon. Berry remained with the Tigers throughout the 1948 season, starting 38 games at shortstop and 26 games at second base while compiling a .266 batting average and .358 on-base percentage.

Berry later recalled that his fondest memory from his playing career was from the final game of the 1948 season. Berry hit a double and two singles off Bob Feller.

=== Starting second baseman (1949) ===
With the retirement of Eddie Mayo, Berry became the Tigers' starting second baseman in 1949. He appeared in 95 games at the position (90 as the starter), but his batting average dropped to .237 batting average with a .299 on-base percentage in 365 plate appearances.

=== 1950-1954 seasons ===
In 1950, Berry lost the starting second baseman job to Jerry Priddy, and with Johnny Lipon at shortstop, Berry saw limited action, starting only nine games at shortstop. He compiled a .250 batting average and .348 on-base percentage in 47 plate appearances. On October 1, 1950, Berry was part of a triple play; with base runners on first and second, George Kell fielded a ground ball at third base, threw to Berry at second base, and Berry then threw to Don Kolloway at first base.

Berry continued as Detroit's backup shortstop, starting 32 games at the position in 1951 and 55 games in 1952.

On October 26, 1952, the Tigers traded Berry and Cliff Mapes to the St. Louis Browns in exchange for pitcher Jake Crawford. Berry was a utility infielder for the Browns in 1953, appearing in 57 games, including 18 games at second base, 18 games at third base, and six games at shortstop. He was released by the Browns in late August and claimed off waivers by the Chicago White Sox on September 1, 1953. He appeared in only five games for the White Sox.

In February 1954, the White Sox traded Berry to the Baltimore Orioles. He concluded his playing career appearing in five games with the Orioles. He appeared in his last major-league game on May 11, 1954.

In his major league career, Berry played in 442 games with a .244 batting average, 835 assists, 612 putouts, 177 double plays, 265 hits, 148 runs scored, 74 RBIs, 28 doubles and no home runs.

=== Managerial career ===
In May 1958, Berry left his sporting goods store in Kalamazoo to manage the Montgomery Rebels.

== Family and later years ==
Berry was a lifelong resident of Kalamazoo. He was married in 1944 to Gloria Lorentzen who he met when they attended kindergarten in Kalamazoo. They had two children, Neil "Skip" Berry (born c. 1948) and Linda Ann Spann (born c. 1951).

After Berry's managerial career in 1958, he returned to his sporting goods business in Kalamazoo. He later held various jobs, installing gymnasium floors, as a carpenter, and for Kalamazoo County. He died in 2016 at Bronson Hospital in Kalamazoo at age 94.

A biography of Berry, "The Shortstop From Kalamazoo: The Life and Times of Neil Berry", was published in 2020.
