= Dick Rozek =

American baseball player (1927–2001)

- Pitcher
- Born: March 27, 1927; Cedar Rapids, Iowa, U.S.
- Died: September 27, 2001 (aged 74); Indio, California, U.S.
- Batted: Left Threw: Left

MLB debut
- April 29, 1950, for the Cleveland Indians

Last MLB appearance
- May 16, 1954, for the Philadelphia Athletics

MLB statistics
- Win–loss record: 1–0
- Earned run average: 4.55
- Strikeouts: 26
- Stats at Baseball Reference

Teams
- Cleveland Indians (1950–1952); Philadelphia Athletics (1953–1954)

Richard Louis Rozek (March 27, 1927 – September 27, 2001) was an American professional baseball pitcher. He played in Major League Baseball (MLB) from 1950 to 1954 for the Cleveland Indians and Philadelphia Athletics.

A native of Cedar Rapids, Iowa, who attended Immaculate Conception High School in that city, he signed with the Indians prior to the 1947 season. In the minor leagues, Rozek struggled with his command, leading the Class A Eastern League in bases on balls (with 180 in 198 innings pitched) in 1948, and walking 146 men in 163 innings the following year in the Double-A Texas League (he led the league in strikeouts, with 145). Rozek then spent three full seasons in the Major Leagues, although he worked in only 29 games (four as a starting pitcher) over that span.

In 1949, Rozek married his hometown sweetheart Imelda Conley.

On September 28, 1952, he recorded his only Major League decision, a victory over the Detroit Tigers. In his only starting assignment of the year, Rozek went six innings, allowing one run, five hits, all singles, and two bases on balls. He left for a pinch hitter with his Indians ahead, 3–1, in a game they ultimately won, 8–2. It was also Rozek's last game in a Cleveland uniform. Not quite three months later, on December 19, 1952, he was traded to the Athletics with a minor leaguer for pitcher Bob Hooper. Apart from in four appearances as a relief pitcher for the A's over the next two seasons, he spent the rest of his career in the minors, leaving the game after the 1955 season.

In 33 total big-league games, and 65 1/3 innings pitched, Rozek allowed 65 hits and 55 bases on balls, with 26 strikeouts.
