= Hal Hudson =

American baseball player (1927–2016)

- Pitcher
- Born: May 4, 1927; Grosse Pointe, Michigan, U.S.
- Died: July 8, 2016 (aged 89); Port St. Lucie, Florida, U.S.
- Batted: Left Threw: Left

MLB debut
- April 20, 1952, for the St. Louis Browns

Last MLB appearance
- September 23, 1953, for the Chicago White Sox

MLB statistics
- Win–loss record: 0–0
- Earned run average: 7.84
- Strikeouts: 4
- Stats at Baseball Reference

Teams
- St. Louis Browns (1952); Chicago White Sox (1952–1953)

Hal Campbell Hudson (May 4, 1927 – July 8, 2016) was an American professional baseball player. A left-handed pitcher, he worked in six Major League games, all in relief, for the St. Louis Browns (1952) and Chicago White Sox (1952–53). Hudson was born in Grosse Point, Michigan, and was listed at 5 feet 10 inches (1.78 m) tall and 170 pounds (77 kg).

Hudson's pro career extended for 13 seasons (1944–55; 1957). He earned his big-league trial with the Browns after compiling a 16–5 win-loss record and a 3.08 earned run average for the Triple-A Toronto Maple Leafs in 1951. He was treated roughly in his American League debut on April 20, 1952, allowing two hits, two bases on balls and four earned runs in two-thirds of an inning against the White Sox. The game was suspended in the seventh frame on April 20, and completed on May 26 with Chicago winning, 10–5. Hudson would be acquired on waivers by the ChiSox on August 27, 1952, after he had spent much of the summer with Triple-A Toronto, where he won another 11 games.

He got into three September games for the White Sox, two in 1952 and one in 1953. Altogether, he allowed 16 hits and seven bases on balls in 101/3 innings pitched over his six MLB games played, with four strikeouts.
