= Ed Mickelson =

American baseball player (1926–2025)

- First baseman
- Born: September 9, 1926; Ottawa, Illinois, U.S.
- Died: June 27, 2025 (aged 98)
- Batted: Right Threw: Right

MLB debut
- September 18, 1950, for the St. Louis Cardinals

Last MLB appearance
- May 12, 1957, for the Chicago Cubs

MLB statistics
- Batting average: .081
- Home runs: 0
- Runs batted in: 3
- Stats at Baseball Reference

Teams
- St. Louis Cardinals (1950); St. Louis Browns (1953); Chicago Cubs (1957)

Edward Allen Mickelson (September 9, 1926 – June 27, 2025) was an American professional baseball player. The 6 ft 3 in (1.91 m), 205 lb (93 kg) Mickelson, a right-handed-hitting first baseman, had an 11-season career, all but 18 games of it spent in minor league baseball. His 18 Major League games played took place during three separate trials for the St. Louis Cardinals (1950), St. Louis Browns (1953), and Chicago Cubs (1957). On September 27, 1953, Mickelson drove in the final run in St. Louis Browns history.

== Biography ==
Mickelson was born in Ottawa, Illinois, on September 9, 1926, and attended Washington University in St. Louis and Oklahoma State University. He played college baseball for the Washington University Bears and the Oklahoma State Cowboys. He signed with the Cardinals in 1947 and was given his first big-league audition at the end of the 1950 minor league season, during which he batted a composite .413 in two Class B leagues. Mickelson collected only one hit and two bases on balls in 12 plate appearances over five games, however, and returned to the minor leagues for almost three full seasons.

Acquired by the Browns' organization, Mickelson was called up in September 1953 after a season spent in the Double-A Texas League. The Browns were at the end of their 52-year stay in St. Louis; owner Bill Veeck was about to sell the team to an ownership group from Baltimore and the team would be reborn as the Orioles the next season. In the third inning of the Browns' final game on Sunday, September 27, at Busch Stadium, facing the Chicago White Sox, Johnny Groth doubled off Billy Pierce with two out. Mickelson then drove home Groth with an opposite-field single to give the Browns a 1–0 lead. But Chicago came back to tie the game in the eighth, sent the contest to extra innings, and won it 2–1 with a run in the top of the 11th. The RBI single was Mickelson's last big-league hit; he went hitless for the rest of that game, and then was 0-for-12 in his last Major League stint with the 1957 Cubs.

Mickelson never appeared for the Orioles. His early-season 1957 stay with the Cubs punctuated four more minor league seasons at the Double-A and Open Classification levels. Although Mickelson collected only three hits, including a double, in 37 MLB at bats (with four bases on balls), he batted .316 with 1,374 hits during his minor-league career.

Mickelson died on June 27, 2025, at the age of 98. His death left Billy Hunter as the last living St. Louis Brown, who himself would die only four days later.
