= Frank Kellert =

American baseball player (1924–1976)

- First baseman
- Born: July 6, 1924; Oklahoma City, Oklahoma, U.S.
- Died: November 19, 1976 (aged 52); Oklahoma City, Oklahoma, U.S.
- Batted: Right Threw: Right

MLB debut
- April 18, 1953, for the St. Louis Browns

Last MLB appearance
- September 29, 1956, for the Chicago Cubs

MLB statistics
- Batting average: .231
- Home runs: 8
- Runs batted in: 37
- Stats at Baseball Reference

Teams
- St. Louis Browns / Baltimore Orioles (1953–1954); Brooklyn Dodgers (1955); Chicago Cubs (1956)

Career highlights and awards
- World Series champion (1955)

Frank William Kellert (July 6, 1924 – November 19, 1976) was an American professional baseball player. The first baseman appeared in 122 games over all or parts of four major league seasons between 1953 and 1956 for the St. Louis Browns/Baltimore Orioles, Brooklyn Dodgers and Chicago Cubs. He was a member of the 1955 world champion Dodgers, the only Brooklyn team to win a World Series. Kellert threw and batted right-handed, and was listed at 6 feet, 21/2 inches (1.89 m) tall and 185 pounds (84 kg).

A native and lifelong resident of Oklahoma City, Oklahoma, he was an alumnus of Classen High School and Oklahoma State University. Kellert was signed by the St. Louis Cardinals in 1949, acquired by his hometown Oklahoma City Indians of the Double-A Texas League in 1951, and sold to the American League Browns in 1953. Making his MLB debut at age 28 for the Browns on April 18, 1953, he was sent back to Oklahoma City after only two games. The following year, playing for the rival San Antonio Missions, Kellert smashed 41 home runs, led the Texas League in runs batted in with 146, and was selected the TL's Most Valuable Player. That earned him another trial with the relocated Baltimore Orioles in late 1954, starting nine September games at first base.

Then, in March 1955, Kellert was traded in a waiver deal to Brooklyn for pitcher Erv Palica. He remained with the Dodgers all season, played in 39 games, and made 17 starts at first base when All-Star and Gold Glover Gil Hodges briefly switched to the outfield in early June and late August. Kellert hit .325 in 80 at bats, with four home runs. In the 1955 World Series, he pinch hit three times, with one hit, a single off Whitey Ford in the eighth inning of Game 1. During Kellert's at bat, Jackie Robinson stole home, but Brooklyn lost to the New York Yankees, 6–5. Kellert pinch hit two more times, going hitless in Dodger losses in Games 2 and 6, but Brooklyn won the series in seven games for its only title before the franchise moved to Los Angeles after the 1957 season.

A week after the Dodger championship, Kellert was placed on waivers and claimed by the Cubs, where he spent the 1956 season but hit only .186 as a part-time first baseman. He played three more seasons in the minors before retiring from baseball at 35.

All told, he collected 57 hits in his 122-game big-league career, with nine doubles, three triples, eight homers and 37 runs batted in. He batted .231. Frank Kellert died in his hometown of Oklahoma City from lymphoma at age 52 in 1976.
