= Hal Erickson (baseball) =

American baseball player (1919–2008)

- Pitcher
- Born: July 17, 1919; Portland, Oregon, U.S.
- Died: February 14, 2008 (aged 88); Ogden, Utah, U.S.
- Batted: Right Threw: Right

MLB debut
- April 14, 1953, for the Detroit Tigers

Last MLB appearance
- July 10, 1953, for the Detroit Tigers

MLB statistics
- Win–loss record: 0–1
- Earned run average: 4.73
- Strikeouts: 19
- Stats at Baseball Reference

Teams
- Detroit Tigers (1953)

Harold James Erickson (July 17, 1919 – February 14, 2008) was an American professional baseball relief pitcher who played briefly for the Detroit Tigers during the 1953 season. Listed at 6 ft 5 in (1.96 m), 230 lb., he batted and threw right-handed.

== Early life ==
Erickson was born in Portland, Oregon.

== Career ==
Erickson was a star pitcher with the 1950 Quebec Braves of the Can-Am League, posting a 20–4 record and leading the league in earned run average, strikeouts, and complete games.

Erickson was a 33-year-old rookie when he entered the majors with Detroit in 1953. In 18 relief appearances, he posted a 0–1 record with a 4.73 ERA and one save, giving up 23 runs (17 unearned) on 43 hits and 10 walks while striking out 19 in 32 1/3 innings of work.

== Death ==
Erickson died in Ogden, Utah, at the age of 88.
