= Rinty Monahan =

American baseball player (1928–2003)

- Pitcher
- Born: April 28, 1928; Brooklyn, New York, U.S.
- Died: July 27, 2003 (aged 75); Brooklyn, New York, U.S.
- Batted: Right Threw: Right

MLB debut
- August 9, 1953, for the Philadelphia Athletics

Last MLB appearance
- August 30, 1953, for the Philadelphia Athletics

MLB statistics
- Win–loss record: 0–0
- Earned run average: 4.22
- Strikeouts: 2
- Innings pitched: 10 2/3
- Stats at Baseball Reference

Teams
- Philadelphia Athletics (1953)

Edward Francis "Rinty" Monahan Jr. (April 28, 1928 – July 27, 2003) was an American professional baseball player, a right-handed pitcher who played for the Philadelphia Athletics of Major League Baseball during August 1953. In four career games pitched, all in relief, he had a 0–0 record, with a 4.22 earned run average.

Monahan grew up in Bay Ridge, Brooklyn, the son of an Irish immigrant. He attended St. Michael's Diocesan High School where he earned a scholarship to play college basketball for the Niagara Purple Eagles. At the time, Niagara did not have a college baseball program but Monahan helped to organize a team which played mostly exhibitions against PONY League teams. During the summers, he continued to play sandlot baseball in Brooklyn where he was noticed by a New York Giants scout who offered him a contract.

In 1952, his fourth year in the Giants' farm system, he won 17 games for the Class A Jacksonville Tars and was selected in the 1952 Rule 5 draft by the Athletics. He spent the entire 1953 campaign on the A's big-league roster, but worked in only four August games. In his most successful appearance, on August 16 at Connie Mack Stadium in the first game of a doubleheader, he pitched the final two innings against the eventual 1953 world champion New York Yankees, allowing only one hit (a single by Irv Noren), one base on balls and no runs.

In his MLB career, Monahan allowed 11 hits and seven bases on balls in 10 2/3 innings pitched, with two strikeouts. His pro career continued in the minor leagues in 1954 and 1957. He died in Brooklyn at age 75.
