= 1953 Boston Red Sox season =

Major League Baseball season

1953 Boston Red Sox
- League: American League
- Ballpark: Fenway Park
- City: Boston, Massachusetts
- Record: 84–69 (.549)
- League place: 4th
- Owners: Tom Yawkey
- President: Tom Yawkey
- General managers: Joe Cronin
- Managers: Lou Boudreau
- Television: WBZ-TV, Ch. 4 and WNAC-TV, Ch. 7
- Radio: WHDH-AM 850 (Curt Gowdy, Bob DeLaney, Tom Hussey)
- Stats: ESPN.com; Baseball Reference

The 1953 Boston Red Sox season was the 53rd season in the franchise's Major League Baseball history. The Red Sox finished fourth in the American League (AL) with a record of 84 wins and 69 losses, 16 games behind the New York Yankees, who went on to win the 1953 World Series.

== Offseason ==
- November 28, 1952: Harry Agganis signs with the Red Sox.
- December 1, 1952: The Red Sox draft Jack Merson from the Hollywood Stars for $15,000.
- January 7, 1953: Pitcher Al Benton is assigned by the Red Sox to the San Diego Padres.
- February 9, 1953: Vern Stephens was traded by the Red Sox to the Chicago White Sox for Marv Grissom, Hal Brown and Bill Kennedy.

== Regular season ==
- May 12, 1953: Outfielder Dom DiMaggio retires from professional baseball after manager Lou Boudreau decided to promote Tom Umphlett to be the regular Red Sox centerfielder; weeks earlier, according to DiMaggio, he had informed General Manager Joe Cronin that he should be traded or made regular centerfielder otherwise he would retire, after Cronin refused to do either, DiMaggio decided to retire.
- June 18, 1953: Sammy White scored three runs in one inning for the Red Sox. The Red Sox defeated the Detroit Tigers, 23–3 at Fenway Park.

=== Transactions ===
- April 23, 1953: The Washington Senators purchase outfielder Clyde Vollmer from the Red Sox.
- May 13, 1953: The Red Sox purchase infielder Floyd Baker from the Washington Senators.
- July 1, 1953: Marv Grissom was selected off waivers from the Red Sox by the New York Giants.
- September 8, 1953: Shortstop Johnny Lipon is sold by the Red Sox to the St. Louis Browns on a waiver deal.

=== Season standings ===
American League
Team	W	L	Pct.	GB	Home	Road
New York Yankees	99	52	.656	—	50‍–‍27	49‍–‍25
Cleveland Indians	92	62	.597	8½	53‍–‍24	39‍–‍38
Chicago White Sox	89	65	.578	11½	41‍–‍36	48‍–‍29
Boston Red Sox	84	69	.549	16	38‍–‍38	46‍–‍31
Washington Senators	76	76	.500	23½	39‍–‍36	37‍–‍40
Detroit Tigers	60	94	.390	40½	30‍–‍47	30‍–‍47
Philadelphia Athletics	59	95	.383	41½	27‍–‍50	32‍–‍45
St. Louis Browns	54	100	.351	46½	23‍–‍54	31‍–‍46

=== Record vs. opponents ===
1953 American League record Sources:
Team	BOS	CWS	CLE	DET	NYY	PHA	SLB	WSH
Boston	—	6–16	13–9	13–9	10–11	15–7	17–5	10–12
Chicago	16–6	—	11–11–1	14–8–1	9–13	10–12	17–5	12–10
Cleveland	9–13	11–11–1	—	14–8	11–11	19–3	17–5	11–11
Detroit	9–13	8–14–1	8–14	—	6–16	11–11–3	7–15	11–11
New York	11–10	13–9	11–11	16–6	—	17–5	17–5	14–6
Philadelphia	7–15	12–10	3–19	11–11–3	5–17	—	13–9	8–14
St. Louis	5–17	5–17	5–17	15–7	5–17	9–13	—	10–12
Washington	12–10	10–12	11–11	11–11	6–14	14–8	12–10	—

=== Opening Day lineup ===
10	Billy Goodman	2B
37	Jimmy Piersall	RF
36	Gene Stephens	LF
3	Dick Gernert	1B
1	George Kell	3B
22	Sammy White	C
38	Tom Umphlett	CF
2	Milt Bolling	SS
17	Mel Parnell	P

=== Roster ===
1953 Boston Red Sox roster
Roster
Pitchers: 27 Hal Brown; 15 Ike Delock; 25 Ben Flowers; 23 Hersh Freeman; 15 Marv Grissom; 28 Bill Henry; 14 Ken Holcombe; 20 Sid Hudson; 18 Bill Kennedy; 16 Ellis Kinder; 19 Mickey McDermott; 21 Willard Nixon; 17 Mel Parnell; 18 Frank Sullivan; 28 Bill Werle	Catchers: 11 Gus Niarhos; 22 Sammy White; 33 Del Wilber; Infielders: 29 Floyd Baker; 2 Milt Bolling; 8 Billy Consolo; 3 Dick Gernert; 10 Billy Goodman; 1 George Kell; 5 Ted Lepcio; 6 Johnny Lipon; 12 Jack Merson; 35 Al Richter	Outfielders: 31 Hoot Evers; 34 Karl Olson; 37 Jimmy Piersall; 36 Gene Stephens; 38 Tom Umphlett; 9 Ted Williams; 32 Al Zarilla; Other batters: 7 Dom DiMaggio; 30 Clyde Vollmer	Manager: 4 Lou Boudreau; Coaches: 41 Del Baker (First base); 40 Bill McKechnie (Pitching); 42 Ski Melillo (Third base); 45 Paul Schreiber (Hitting); 43 George Susce (Bullpen)

== Player stats ==
=== Batting ===
==== Starters by position ====
Note: Pos = Position; G = Games played; AB = At bats; H = Hits; Avg. = Batting average; HR = Home runs; RBI = Runs batted in

Pos	Player	G	AB	H	Avg.	HR	RBI
C	Sammy White	136	476	130	.273	13	64
1B	Dick Gernert	139	494	125	.253	21	71
2B	Billy Goodman	128	514	161	.313	2	41
SS	Milt Bolling	109	323	85	.263	5	28
3B	George Kell	134	460	141	.307	12	73
OF	Hoot Evers	99	300	72	.240	11	31
OF	Jim Piersall	151	585	159	.272	3	52
OF	Tom Umphlett	137	495	140	.283	3	59

==== Other batters ====
Note: G = Games played; AB = At bats; H = Hits; Avg. = Batting average; HR = Home runs; RBI = Runs batted in

Player	G	AB	H	Avg.	HR	RBI
Gene Stephens	78	221	45	.204	3	18
Floyd Baker	81	172	47	.273	0	24
Ted Lepcio	66	161	38	.236	4	11
Johnny Lipon	60	145	31	.214	0	13
Del Wilber	58	112	27	.241	7	29
Ted Williams	37	91	37	.407	13	34
Al Zarilla	57	67	13	.194	0	4
Billy Consolo	47	65	14	.215	1	6
Karl Olson	25	57	7	.123	1	6
Gus Niarhos	16	35	7	.200	0	2
Jack Merson	1	4	0	.000	0	0
Dom DiMaggio	3	3	1	.333	0	0
Clyde Vollmer	1	0	0	----	0	0
Al Richter	1	0	0	----	0	0

=== Pitching ===
==== Starting pitchers ====
Note: G = Games pitched; IP = Innings pitched; W = Wins; L = Losses; ERA = Earned run average; SO = Strikeouts

Player	G	IP	W	L	ERA	SO
Mel Parnell	38	241.0	21	8	3.06	136
Mickey McDermott	32	206.1	18	10	3.01	92
Hal Brown	30	166.1	11	6	4.65	62
Willard Nixon	23	116.2	4	8	3.93	57
Marv Grissom	13	59.1	2	6	4.70	31

==== Other pitchers ====
Note: G = Games pitched; IP = Innings pitched; W = Wins; L = Losses; ERA = Earned run average; SO = Strikeouts

Player	G	IP	W	L	ERA	SO
Sid Hudson	30	156.0	6	9	3.52	60
Bill Henry	21	85.2	5	5	3.26	56
Ben Flowers	32	79.1	1	4	3.86	36

==== Relief pitchers ====
Note: G = Games pitched; W = Wins; L = Losses; SV = Saves; ERA = Earned run average; SO = Strikeouts

Player	G	W	L	SV	ERA	SO
Ellis Kinder	69	10	6	27	1.85	39
Ike Delock	23	3	1	1	4.44	22
Hersh Freeman	18	1	4	0	5.54	15
Bill Kennedy	16	0	0	2	3.70	14
Frank Sullivan	14	1	1	0	5.61	17
Bill Werle	5	0	1	0	1.54	4
Ken Holcombe	3	1	0	1	6.00	1

== Farm system ==
Level	Team	League	Manager
AAA	Louisville Colonels	American Association	Pinky Higgins
A	Albany Senators	Eastern League	Jack Burns and Elmer Yoter
B	Greensboro Patriots	Carolina League	Eddie Popowski
B	Roanoke Ro-Sox	Piedmont League	Elmer Yoter
C	San Jose Red Sox	California League	Red Marion and Joe Stephenson
D	Salisbury Rocots	Tar Heel League	Sheriff Robinson

LEAGUE CHAMPIONS: San Jose

Roanoke club folded, July 24, 1953
