= 1953 Cleveland Indians season =

1953 Cleveland Indians
- League: American League
- Ballpark: Cleveland Municipal Stadium
- City: Cleveland, Ohio
- Owners: Myron H. Wilson
- General managers: Hank Greenberg
- Managers: Al López
- Television: WXEL (Bob Neal, Red Jones)
- Radio: WERE (Jack Graney, Jimmy Dudley)

The 1953 Cleveland Indians season was a season in American baseball. The team finished second in the American League with a record of 92–62, 8 1/2 games behind the New York Yankees.

== Offseason ==
- December 11, 1952: Earl Averill, Jr. was signed as an amateur free agent by the Indians.

== Regular season ==
Al Rosen became the first third baseman in the history of the American League to win the MVP Award.

=== Season standings ===
American League
Team	W	L	Pct.	GB	Home	Road
New York Yankees	99	52	.656	—	50‍–‍27	49‍–‍25
Cleveland Indians	92	62	.597	8½	53‍–‍24	39‍–‍38
Chicago White Sox	89	65	.578	11½	41‍–‍36	48‍–‍29
Boston Red Sox	84	69	.549	16	38‍–‍38	46‍–‍31
Washington Senators	76	76	.500	23½	39‍–‍36	37‍–‍40
Detroit Tigers	60	94	.390	40½	30‍–‍47	30‍–‍47
Philadelphia Athletics	59	95	.383	41½	27‍–‍50	32‍–‍45
St. Louis Browns	54	100	.351	46½	23‍–‍54	31‍–‍46

=== Record vs. opponents ===
1953 American League record Sources:
Team	BOS	CWS	CLE	DET	NYY	PHA	SLB	WSH
Boston	—	6–16	13–9	13–9	10–11	15–7	17–5	10–12
Chicago	16–6	—	11–11–1	14–8–1	9–13	10–12	17–5	12–10
Cleveland	9–13	11–11–1	—	14–8	11–11	19–3	17–5	11–11
Detroit	9–13	8–14–1	8–14	—	6–16	11–11–3	7–15	11–11
New York	11–10	13–9	11–11	16–6	—	17–5	17–5	14–6
Philadelphia	7–15	12–10	3–19	11–11–3	5–17	—	13–9	8–14
St. Louis	5–17	5–17	5–17	15–7	5–17	9–13	—	10–12
Washington	12–10	10–12	11–11	11–11	6–14	14–8	12–10	—

=== Notable transactions ===
- May 1953: Brooks Lawrence was acquired from the Indians by the Cincinnati Reds.
- June 15, 1953: Ray Boone, Al Aber, Steve Gromek, and Dick Weik were traded by the Indians to the Detroit Tigers for Art Houtteman, Owen Friend, Bill Wight, and Joe Ginsberg.

=== Roster ===
1953 Cleveland Indians
Roster
Pitchers: 29 Al Aber; 12 Lou Brissie; 20 Bob Chakales; 19 Bob Feller; 25 Mike Garcia; 27 Steve Gromek; 26 Bob Hooper; 41,29,11 Art Houtteman; 21 Bob Lemon; 28 Dick Tomanek; 18,27 Bill Wight; 28 Ted Wilks; 24 Early Wynn	Catchers: 15 Dick Aylward; 16 Hank Foiles; 15 Joe Ginsberg; 4 Jim Hegan; 18 Joe Tipton; Infielders: 1 Bobby Ávila; 8 Ray Boone; 9 Luke Easter; 8 Owen Friend; 14,6 Bill Glynn; 5 Hank Majeski; 7 Al Rosen; 2 George Strickland	Outfielders: 6,14 Larry Doby; 33 Bob Kennedy; 17 Jim Lemon; 3 Dale Mitchell; 35 Harry Simpson; 32 Al Smith; 31 Wally Westlake; Other batters: 32 Barney McCosky; 37 Dick Weik	Manager: 10 Al López; Coaches: 44 Tony Cuccinello (Third Base); 43 Mel Harder (Pitching); 42 Red Kress (First Base); 40 Bill Lobe (Bullpen)

== Player stats ==
= Indicates team leader

= Indicates league leader

=== Batting ===
==== Starters by position ====
Note: Pos = Position; G = Games played; AB = At bats; H = Hits; Avg. = Batting average; HR = Home runs; RBI = Runs batted in

Pos	Player	G	AB	H	Avg.	HR	RBI
C	Jim Hegan	112	299	65	.217	9	37
1B	Bill Glynn	147	411	100	.243	3	30
2B	Bobby Ávila	141	559	160	.286	8	55
SS	George Strickland	123	419	119	.284	5	47
3B	Al Rosen	155	599	201	.336	43	145
OF	Larry Doby	149	513	135	.263	29	102
OF	Harry Simpson	82	242	55	.227	7	22
OF	Dale Mitchell	134	500	150	.300	13	60

==== Other batters ====
Note: G = Games played; AB = At bats; H = Hits; Avg. = Batting average; HR = Home runs; RBI = Runs batted in

Player	G	AB	H	Avg.	HR	RBI
Wally Westlake	82	218	72	.330	9	46
Luke Easter	68	211	64	.303	7	31
Bob Kennedy	100	161	38	.236	3	22
Al Smith	47	150	36	.240	3	14
Ray Boone	34	112	27	.241	4	21
Joe Tipton	47	109	25	.229	6	13
Joe Ginsberg	46	109	31	.284	0	10
Owen Friend	34	68	16	.235	2	13
Hank Majeski	50	50	15	.300	2	12
Jim Lemon	16	46	8	.174	1	5
Barney McCosky	22	21	4	.190	0	3
Hank Foiles	7	7	1	.143	0	0
Dick Aylward	4	3	0	.000	0	0
Dick Weik	1	0	0	----	0	0

=== Pitching ===
==== Starting pitchers ====
Note: G = Games pitched; IP = Innings pitched; W = Wins; L = Losses; ERA = Earned run average; SO = Strikeouts

Player	G	IP	W	L	ERA	SO
Bob Lemon	41	286.2	21	15	3.36	98
Mike Garcia	38	271.2	18	9	3.25	134
Early Wynn	36	251.2	17	12	3.93	138
Bob Feller	25	175.2	10	7	3.59	60
Dick Tomanek	1	9.0	1	0	2.00	6

==== Other pitchers ====
Note: G = Games pitched; IP = Innings pitched; W = Wins; L = Losses; ERA = Earned run average; SO = Strikeouts

Player	G	IP	W	L	ERA	SO
Dave Hoskins	26	112.2	9	3	3.99	55
Art Houtteman	22	109.0	7	7	3.80	40
Bob Chakales	7	27.0	0	2	2.67	6
Steve Gromek	5	11.0	1	1	3.27	8

==== Relief pitchers ====
Note: G = Games pitched; W = Wins; L = Losses; SV = Saves; ERA = Earned run average; SO = Strikeouts

Player	G	W	L	SV	ERA	SO
Bob Hooper	43	5	4	7	4.02	16
Bill Wight	20	2	1	1	3.71	14
Lou Brissie	16	0	0	2	7.62	5
Al Aber	6	1	1	0	7.50	4
Ted Wilks	4	0	0	0	7.36	2

== Awards and records ==
- Al Rosen, American League MVP

== Farm system ==
Level	Team	League	Manager
AAA	Indianapolis Indians	American Association	Birdie Tebbetts
A	Reading Indians	Eastern League	Kerby Farrell
B	Spartanburg Peaches	Tri-State League	Jimmy Bloodworth
C	Fargo-Moorhead Twins	Northern League	Zeke Bonura and Santo Luberto
C	Sherbrooke Indians	Provincial League	Pinky May
D	Daytona Beach Islanders	Florida State League	Ed Levy
D	Green Bay Blue Jays	Wisconsin State League	Phil Seghi

LEAGUE CHAMPIONS: Fargo-Moorhead, Daytona Beach, Green Bay

- On May 6, 1953, the Fargo-Moorhead Twins defeated Sioux Falls in their Opening Day game by a score of 12–3. A record crowd of 10,123 fans came to Barnett Field. In the game, Roger Maris got his first professional baseball hit. That season, Twins player Frank Gravino would hit 52 home runs. The Twins would host the Northern League All-Star game and defeat the Northern League All-Stars by a score of 8–4. The Twins finished with a record of 86–39 (improving from their record of 44–80 in 1952) and bested Duluth to win the Northern League championship. Roger Maris was selected as the 1953 Northern League Rookie of the Year.
