= Neal Watlington =

American baseball player (1922–2019)

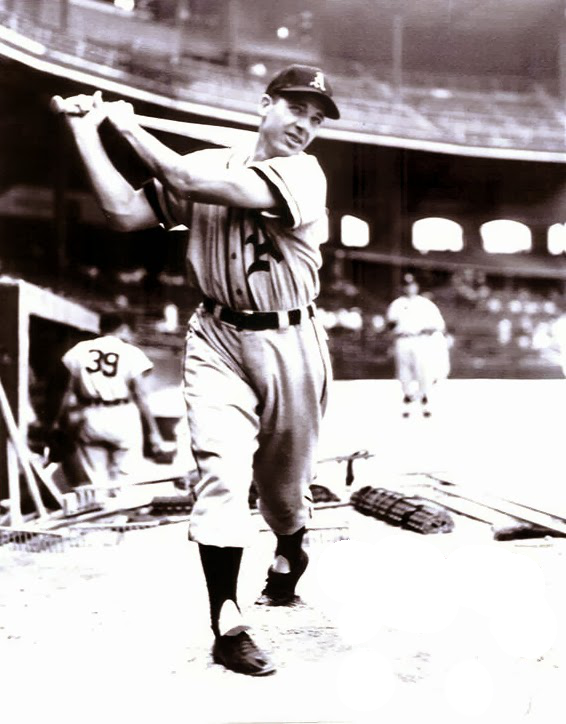
- Watlington with the Philadelphia Athletics in 1953
- Catcher
- Born: December 25, 1922; Yanceyville, North Carolina, U.S.
- Died: December 29, 2019 (aged 97); Yanceyville, North Carolina, U.S.
- Batted: Left Threw: Right

MLB debut
- July 10, 1953, for the Philadelphia Athletics

Last MLB appearance
- September 17, 1953, for the Philadelphia Athletics

MLB statistics
- Batting average: .159
- Home runs: 0
- Runs batted in: 3
- Stats at Baseball Reference

Teams
- Philadelphia Athletics (1953)

Julius Neal Watlington (December 25, 1922 – December 29, 2019) was an American Major League Baseball player for the Philadelphia Athletics in 1953. Born in Yanceyville, North Carolina, he batted left-handed and threw right-handed; he was listed as 6 feet (1.83 m) tall and 195 pounds (88 kg).

Watlington broke into professional baseball in the minor leagues in 1941, then missed five seasons (1942–46). He served in the United States Army in the European Theater of Operations during World War II, where he received a Purple Heart during his service and was 24 years old when he was signed as a free agent by the New York Giants in 1947. Primarily a catcher, Watlington was acquired by Philadelphia in February 1952 when the Athletics took over as parent team of the Triple-A Ottawa Giants of the International League.

The Athletics recalled Watlington from Ottawa in the midsummer of 1953, and he appeared in 21 games for them through the remainder of the American League season. He started seven games at catcher, served as a defensive replacement in one contest, and was a pinch hitter in 13 others. Watlington's 47 plate appearances produced seven hits, including one double, and three bases on balls. He scored four runs. He returned to the International League in 1954 and played five more seasons of Triple-A baseball until his 1958 retirement.

In 2016 Watlington received France's Legion of Honour medal for his combat services to help liberate that nation during World War II.
