= Bob Cain =

American baseball player (1924–1997)

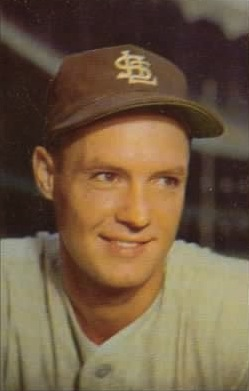
- Cain c. 1953
- Pitcher
- Born: October 16, 1924; Longford, Kansas, U.S.
- Died: April 8, 1997 (aged 72); Cleveland, Ohio, U.S.
- Batted: Left Threw: Left

MLB debut
- September 18, 1949, for the Chicago White Sox

Last MLB appearance
- September 11, 1954, for the Chicago White Sox

MLB statistics
- Win–loss record: 37–44
- Earned run average: 4.50
- Strikeouts: 249
- Stats at Baseball Reference

Teams
- Chicago White Sox (1949–1951); Detroit Tigers (1951); St. Louis Browns (1952–1953); Chicago White Sox (1954)

Robert Max "Sugar" Cain (October 16, 1924 – April 8, 1997) was an American Major League Baseball pitcher with the Chicago White Sox, Detroit Tigers and St. Louis Browns between 1949 and 1954. He batted and threw left-handed. On August 19, 1951, Cain was the pitcher who issued a base on balls to Eddie Gaedel, at 3 feet 7 inches (109 cm) the shortest person to appear in a major league game.

== Biography ==
Cain was born on October 16, 1924, in Longford, Kansas. He was signed to a contract with the New York Giants in 1943. Cain shut out the New York Yankees in his first major league start in 1949. On April 23, 1952, he matched one-hitters with Bob Feller and won, 1–0 at Sportsman's Park in St. Louis.

On August 19, 1951, St. Louis Browns owner Bill Veeck put the 3 foot, 7 inch Eddie Gaedel into the game with instructions to hold his bat on his shoulder and not swing. Cain later recalled: "I went out to the mound to start to pitch the bottom half of the first and as I was warming up, Eddie went over and got these little bats. We couldn't understand what was going on." In his crouch, Gaedel reportedly had a strike zone of 1 1/2 inches. Detroit catcher, Bob Swift, advised Cain to "keep it low." According to observers, Cain was laughing so hard at the prospect of pitching to Gaedel that "he's practically falling off the mound with each pitch." Cain proceeded to walk Gaedel on four straight pitches, all high.

Just over 2 1/2 months after the Browns moved to Baltimore, Cain was traded to the Philadelphia Athletics for Joe Coleman and Frank Fanovich on 17 December 1953.

Cain pitched six seasons in the major leagues with the Chicago White Sox (1949–1951, 1954), Detroit Tigers (1951), and St. Louis Browns (1952–1953), also appearing as a pinch-runner in one game for the White Sox in 1954. Cain played in 150 major league games, with 140 appearances as a pitcher, for 628 innings, with a career record of 37–44 and an earned run average of 4.50.

After leaving baseball, Cain lived in Euclid, Ohio, for the last 40 years of his life, and died of cancer in Cleveland at age 72.
