= Kite Thomas =

American baseball player (1923–1995)

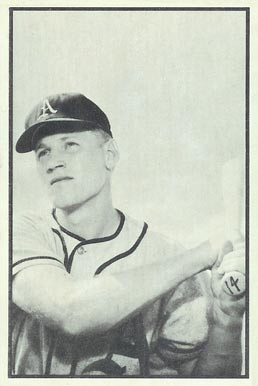
- Outfielder
- Born: April 27, 1923; Kansas City, Kansas
- Died: January 7, 1995 (aged 71); Rocky Mount, North Carolina
- Batted: Right Threw: Right

MLB debut
- April 19, 1952, for the Philadelphia Athletics

Last MLB appearance
- September 27, 1953, for the Washington Senators

MLB statistics
- Batting average: .233
- Home runs: 7
- Runs batted in: 32
- Stats at Baseball Reference

Teams
- Philadelphia Athletics (1952–1953); Washington Senators (1953)

Keith Marshall "Kite" Thomas (April 27, 1923 – January 7, 1995) was an American professional baseball outfielder during the 1940s and 1950s. He appeared in 137 games in Major League Baseball (MLB) as a member of the Philadelphia Athletics (1952–53) and Washington Senators (1953). The native of Kansas City, Kansas, threw and batted right-handed, stood 6 feet 1 inch (1.85 m) tall and weighed 195 pounds (88 kg).

Thomas attended Kansas State University, where he played one season as a starter on the varsity baseball team before signing with the New York Yankees. He then spent five seasons in the Yankee farm system, peaking at the Triple-A level with his hometown Kansas City Blues in 1951. His selection by the Athletics in the 1951 Rule 5 draft paved the way for his two full seasons in the American League. In 1952, he got into 75 games (19 as a starting outfielder); in 138 plate appearances, he collected 29 hits, with six doubles, one triple, six home runs and 20 bases on balls. On July 15, he had three hits in four at bats, including a home run that helped lead Philadelphia to a six-run, ninth inning rally to beat the St. Louis Browns, 7–6.

In 1953, Thomas collected only six singles in 49 at bats with the Athletics, then was released on waivers to the Senators on June 30. He batted .293 with six extra-base hits in 38 games during the last three months of the season. On September 26, the career outfielder started at catcher for the Senators against his old Athletics teammates, but made two errors in the field and Washington lost, 11–2. Thomas was traded to the Chicago White Sox during spring training in 1954, but spent the year in the minors. It was his last season in professional baseball.

Altogether, Thomas had 52 hits, with nine doubles, three triples, seven homers, and 32 runs batted in during his two-year MLB career.
