= Steve Kraly =

American baseball player

- Pitcher
- Born: April 18, 1929; Whiting, Indiana, U.S.
- Died: March 7, 2016 (aged 86); Johnson City, New York, U.S.
- Batted: Left Threw: Left

MLB debut
- August 9, 1953, for the New York Yankees

Last MLB appearance
- September 15, 1953, for the New York Yankees

MLB statistics
- Win–loss record: 0–2
- Earned run average: 3.24
- Strikeouts: 8
- Stats at Baseball Reference

Teams
- New York Yankees (1953)

Career highlights and awards
- World Series Champion (1953)

Steve Charles (Lefty) Kraly (April 18, 1929 – March 7, 2016) was an American Major League Baseball pitcher who played five games for the New York Yankees in 1953, compiling a 0–2 record, with a 3.24 ERA over 25 innings. He batted and threw left-handed.

Kraly was signed by the Yankees as an amateur free agent in 1949.

== Baseball career ==
Steve Kraly appeared briefly in Major League Baseball during 1953 and also played in the minor leagues for several years.

=== Minor Leagues ===
Before playing with the Binghamton Triplets, Kraly was a starter with the Joplin Miners in the Western Association, where he compiled an 18–6 season with 2.79 ERA. During his time there, he was a roommate with Mickey Mantle, Lou Skizas and Bob Wiesler. After that experience he quoted: "We enjoyed it and we had a lot of fun. We became like brothers, not just teammates."

Kraly played with the Eastern League Binghamton Triplets during the 1953 season, going 19–2 over his 22 starts before being called up to the majors to play for the Yankees.

Kraly also played for the Nashville Vols in 1959, pitching as a reliever, and while playing at Nashville, Kraly totalled a 10–3 mark.

Kraly was the official scorer of the Binghamton Mets from their start in 1992 through 2014.

In August 2008 fans voted for Steve Kraly to be shown on a bobblehead figurine from 18,433 votes for several famous local Binghamton residents. After a brief speech of gratitude Kraly went on to do the first pitch. The bobblehead was then given away to the first 1,500 fans to arrive at the stadium on Saturday, 23 August.

=== New York Yankees ===
Steve Kraly was originally called up to the Yankees in 1949, but did not appear in any games. He served in the United States Army during the Korean War, which held back his MLB hopes until 1953. Steve Kraly played on the New York Yankees team during 1953 under Casey Stengel but retired due to a problematic shoulder blood clot and other injuries.

He also appeared in one of the largest margins of victory in MLB history with 28 hits and winning against the Washington Senators 22–1, pitching alongside Whitey Ford.

Kraly estimated that he could have played with the Yankees for 4–7 years. Kraly also received a World Series ring as a member of the winning roster, although not playing in any World Series games. Kraly was scheduled to play in Game 5 of the 1953 baseball World Series, but was unable to participate because of injuries.

=== New York Mets ===
In 1961 Hall of Fame Manager Casey Stengel bought Steve Kraly's contract, offering him $26,000 a year to play with the New York Mets, who were about to begin their first season as an expansion franchise in 1962. Kraly declined the contract to spend more time with his wife and children.

== Baseball cards ==
Steve Kraly's 1955 Topps Baseball Rookie card remains his first and only original baseball card produced. In 2004 Topps asked Kraly to be part of their 2004 Topps Heritage Authentic Signatures Insert series. Out of the 450 cards Kraly was asked to sign, he signed the first 50 in red ink.

== Media ==
Steve Kraly was asked to give information for Kenneth Hogan's book, Batting 10th for the Yankees: Recollection of 30 Yankees You May Not Remember. Kraly was also a contributor and is mentioned several times in Tony Castro's book Mickey Mantle: America's Prodigal Son. He also was quoted in Pat Williams' book How to Be Like Jackie Robinson: Life Lessons from Baseball's Greatest Hero "Jakie Robinson made a great contribution to the game. The hurdles he had to defeat to allow other African Americans to play were great. His memory will live forever. He is an immortal in the class of Ted Williams, Mickey Mantle and Babe Ruth. What he did for the game will live on forever." He was also quoted during a telephone interview about Mickey Mantle's strong arm: "If there was an infield pop-up, we’d tell him to get out of the way! He had such a strong arm, when he threw to first, nobody sat in the box seats behind first base." In 1958 Sports Illustrated writer Robert Creamer named the 1953 Yankee team as one of the greatest Yankee teams ever, along with the 1927 "Murderer's Row" team and the 1936 Yankee squad.

== Death ==
He died on March 7, 2016, after a long illness.
