= Spider Wilhelm =

American baseball player

- Shortstop
- Born: May 23, 1929; Baltimore, Maryland, U.S.
- Died: October 20, 1992 (aged 63); Venice, Florida, U.S.
- Batted: Right Threw: Right

MLB debut
- September 6, 1953, for the Philadelphia Athletics

Last MLB appearance
- September 27, 1953, for the Philadelphia Athletics

MLB statistics
- At bats: 7
- RBI: 0
- Home runs: 0
- Batting average: .286
- Stats at Baseball Reference

Teams
- Philadelphia Athletics (1953)

Charles Ernest "Spider" Wilhelm (May 23, 1929 – October 20, 1992) was an American professional baseball player who played in seven games for the Philadelphia Athletics during the 1953 season. He also played professionally in Cuba. He was born in Baltimore, Maryland and died in Venice, Florida at the age of 63.
