= Hank Edwards =

American baseball player (1919–1988)

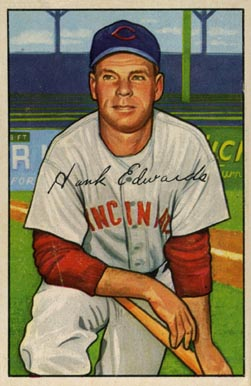
- Outfielder
- Born: January 29, 1919; Elmwood Place, Ohio, U.S.
- Died: June 22, 1988 (aged 69); Santa Ana, California, U.S.
- Batted: Left Threw: Left

MLB debut
- September 10, 1941, for the Cleveland Indians

Last MLB appearance
- September 26, 1953, for the St. Louis Browns

MLB statistics
- Batting average: .280
- Home runs: 51
- Runs batted in: 276
- Stats at Baseball Reference

Teams
- Cleveland Indians (1941–1943, 1946–1949); Chicago Cubs (1949–1950); Brooklyn Dodgers (1951); Cincinnati Reds (1951–1952); Chicago White Sox (1952); St. Louis Browns (1953)

Henry Albert Edwards (January 29, 1919 – June 22, 1988) was an American professional baseball outfielder. He played 11 seasons in Major League Baseball (MLB) between 1941 and 1953 for the Cleveland Indians, Chicago Cubs, Brooklyn Dodgers, Cincinnati Reds, Chicago White Sox, and St. Louis Browns. he threw and batted left-handed, stood 6 feet (1.8 m) tall and weighed 190 pounds (86 kg). He had an injury-plagued career, suffering at various times from a broken ankle, a fractured collarbone and a dislocated shoulder.

== Biography ==
Edwards was a native of Elmwood Place, Ohio.

After playing for the Indians between 1941 and 1943, Edwards had his career interrupted by service in the United States Army in 1944–45 during World War II. Returning to the Indians after the war, led the American League in triples (16) in 1946, his only year as a regular outfielder in MLB. Edwards batted .301 that season, and started 116 games as the Indians' right fielder. Four years later, in 1950, he hit .364 in part-time duty as a member of the Cubs.

In his 11 major league seasons, he played in 735 games and had 2,191 at bats, 285 runs, 613 hits, 116 doubles, 41 triples, 51 home runs, 276 runs batted in, nine stolen bases and 208 bases on balls, with a .280 batting average, .343 on-base percentage and .440 slugging percentage. He amassed 964 total bases and was credited with eight sacrifice hits. He finished his career with a .981 fielding percentage playing at all three outfield positions.

Edwards' last MLB season was 1953, and he played minor league baseball until 1956. He died in Santa Ana, California on June 22, 1988 after a long illness. His funeral services were held in Santa Ana.

== See also ==
- List of Major League Baseball annual triples leaders
