= Ed McGhee =

American baseball player (1924–1986)

- Outfielder
- Born: September 29, 1924; Perry, Arkansas, U.S.
- Died: February 13, 1986 (aged 61); Memphis, Tennessee, U.S.
- Batted: Right Threw: Right

MLB debut
- September 20, 1950, for the Chicago White Sox

Last MLB appearance
- May 26, 1955, for the Chicago White Sox

MLB statistics
- Batting average: .246
- Home runs: 3
- Runs batted in: 43
- Stats at Baseball Reference

Teams
- Chicago White Sox (1950); Philadelphia Athletics (1953–1954); Chicago White Sox (1954–1955)

Warren Edward McGhee (September 29, 1924 – February 13, 1986) was an American professional baseball outfielder. He played in Major League Baseball (MLB) from 1950 to 1956 for the Chicago White Sox and Philadelphia Athletics. He was an alumnus of Arkansas State University.

McGhee prepped in the White Sox' farm system for five seasons (1948–52), interrupted by a three-game MLB trial at the end of the 1950 season. McGhee started one game, the season finale against the St. Louis Browns, and notched his first big-league hit, a triple off Stubby Overmire. On January 27, 1953, he was included in a five-player trade with Philadelphia that brought two-time American League batting champion Ferris Fain to Chicago.

McGhee was the regular center fielder for the 1953 Athletics and reached big-league career highs in games played (104) and most offensive categories. However, he batted only .263 with one home run. In 1954, McGhee lost the regular centerfield job to Vic Power, a future fancy-fielding first baseman, and was traded back to the White Sox on June 11. He batted only .227 with the ChiSox in part-time duty, then went only one for 13 in the early weeks of 1955 before his demotion to the minor leagues. His professional career continued through 1957.

During his MLB career, Ed McGhee had 124 hits, with 14 doubles, five triples and three home runs.
