= Bob Habenicht =

American baseball player (1926–1980)

- Pitcher
- Born: February 13, 1926; St. Louis, Missouri, U.S.
- Died: December 24, 1980 (aged 54); Richmond, Virginia, U.S.
- Batted: Right Threw: Right

MLB debut
- April 17, 1951, for the St. Louis Cardinals

Last MLB appearance
- May 3, 1953, for the St. Louis Browns

MLB statistics
- Win–loss record: 0–0
- Earned run average: 6.75
- Strikeouts: 2
- Stats at Baseball Reference

Teams
- St. Louis Cardinals (1951); St. Louis Browns (1953)

Robert Julius Habenicht (February 13, 1926 – December 24, 1980) was an American professional baseball player and right-handed pitcher who appeared in four Major League Baseball games—all in relief—for the 1951 St. Louis Cardinals and 1953 St. Louis Browns. Born in St. Louis, he batted right-handed and was listed as 6 feet 2 inches (1.88 m) tall and 185 pounds (84 kg).

Habenicht's 11-season professional career began in 1944 and continued into 1956, with the 1945 campaign taken up by his service in the United States Army Air Force during World War II. After playing in the Cardinal farm system through 1950, he made the Redbird roster in April and worked in three early-season National League games before returning to the minors. At the close of 1952, which Habenicht split between Double-A Houston and Triple-A Rochester, the Cards placed him on waivers, and the city's American League team, the Browns, picked him up. On May 3, 1953, Habenicht made his only appearance for the Browns in his final MLB game, allowing one run in 12/3 innings pitched against the Boston Red Sox at Busch Stadium. He spent the remainder of 1953, and all of the following two seasons, in Triple-A before leaving baseball.

In four MLB games pitched, Habenicht did not earn a decision and posted an earned run average of 6.75 in 62/3 innings pitched. He allowed six hits, ten bases on balls, and one hit batsman, with two strikeouts.
