= Ferris Fain =

American baseball player (1921–2001)

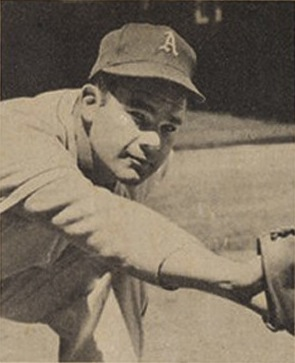
- First baseman
- Born: March 29, 1921; San Antonio, Texas, U.S.
- Died: October 18, 2001 (aged 80); Georgetown, California, U.S.
- Batted: Left Threw: Left

MLB debut
- April 15, 1947, for the Philadelphia Athletics

Last MLB appearance
- September 24, 1955, for the Cleveland Indians

MLB statistics
- Batting average: .290
- Home runs: 48
- Runs batted in: 570
- Stats at Baseball Reference

Teams
- Philadelphia Athletics (1947–1952); Chicago White Sox (1953–1954); Detroit Tigers (1955); Cleveland Indians (1955)

Career highlights and awards
- 5× All-Star (1950–1954); 2× AL batting champion (1951, 1952); Philadelphia Baseball Wall of Fame

Ferris Roy Fain (March 29, 1921 – October 18, 2001) was an American professional baseball player. He played as a first baseman in Major League Baseball from 1947 to 1955. A five-time All-Star, Fain won two American League batting championships and his career on-base percentage of .424 ranks 13th highest in Major League Baseball history.

Fain played nine seasons with the Philadelphia Athletics, Chicago White Sox, Detroit Tigers and Cleveland Indians in the American League. Known as one of the Athletics' last stars before moving to Kansas City, he had an explosive temper on and off the field. Eventually it affected his playing ability, and the Athletics traded him after the 1952 season. In his later life, Fain made headlines for his troubles with the law, mainly growing marijuana.

== Early life ==
Fain was born in San Antonio, Texas, the son of Oscar Fain, a jockey best known for leading his horse Duval to a second-place finish in the 1912 Kentucky Derby, and a domestic maid. He had a "very abusive" childhood, mainly at the hands of the father, who died when he was still a child. His mother did domestic work in order for the family to survive. He grew up in Oakland, California, where he graduated from Roosevelt High School as student body president. He joined the San Francisco Seals of the Pacific Coast League during his senior year of high school, when Seals manager Lefty O'Doul offered to pay $200 a month "under the table", as Fain's amateur status made him ineligible to join the team. He spent 1939–1942 and 1946 with the Seals, where he led the league in runs batted in (RBIs) in 1941. He missed three seasons, 1943–45, due to military service, during which he played baseball for the Army.

== Career ==
Connie Mack paid the Seals $6,500 for Fain's services in order for Fain to play for the Athletics in 1947. Playing a full schedule, the left-handed hitter had 461 at bats in his rookie season. That year, he batted .291 with seven home runs and 71 RBIs in 136 games. In the 1948 season, Fain played in 145 games, with an .288 batting average, seven home runs, and what would be a career high 88 runs batted in. Fain was a member of the 1949 Philadelphia Athletics team that set a major league team record by turning 217 double plays, a record which still stood as of 2016; Fain himself took part in 194 double plays as a first baseman. In 1950 Fain played in a career high 150 games, batting .282 with 10 home runs and 83 RBI as he was named to his first All-Star team.

Fain broke through during the 1951 season, leading the American League with a .344 batting average. He also hit six homers and 57 RBIs, although a broken foot limited him to 425 at-bats. That year he finished sixth in the Most Valuable Player Award voting as Yogi Berra won the award. During the 1952 season, Fain again led the American League with a .324 batting average, despite breaking his hand in a bar fight and hiding the injury from his manager Jimmie Dykes near the end of the season. He also led the league in doubles (43), and on-base percentage and third in hits as he finished sixth in the Most Valuable Player award behind winner and A's teammate Bobby Shantz. However, Fain was known for a hot temper in the field, along with a drinking problem, which caused tension with the team. After the 1952 season, the Athletics traded Fain to the Chicago White Sox for fellow first baseman Eddie Robinson and infielders Ed McGhee and Joe DeMaestri. After the trade, White Sox general manager Frank Lane proclaimed with his acquisition of Fain, the White Sox had the "finest defensive infield in baseball". The New York Yankees were also interested in Fain, but a deal couldn't get completed.

According to former teammate Eddie Joost, Fain "had a lifestyle of his own and would do exactly what he wanted to do. There were many things the players didn't like about him. Occasionally he'd overdrink and wouldn't be attentive on the field." Fain had an off-year in 1953 after getting into a brawl in a Maryland café with several White Sox fans. He was fined $600 by the White Sox, then sued for $50,000. In the 1953 Major League Baseball All-Star Game, Fain scored the only run for the American League in the ninth inning of a 5–1 loss. After suffering a knee injury the following year, Fain never really got back on track. But on June 16, 1954, he hit an inside-the-park grand slam. He participated in his last All-Star Game as a starter alongside his White Sox infield teammates Nellie Fox, George Kell and Chico Carrasquel. It made the 1954 White Sox the first team ever to have four infield starters from the same team starting the All-Star Game. In 1955, he played for the Detroit Tigers and Cleveland Indians. He batted .260 with two home runs and 31 RBIs; however he was hobbled by knee issues and retired after the season.

Fain finished with an on-base percentage of over .400 every full year that he played, and was in the top 10 in that category seven times in his career; he ranked in the top 10 in walks eight times.

In a nine-season career, he hit .290 with 48 home runs, 570 RBIs, and 1139 career hits in 3930 at bats. He also had 213 career doubles and a career .424 on-base percentage (13th best all-time). Not least of all, Fain was regarded by some as the best fielding first baseman in the majors until Vic Power assumed Fain's old position for the A's. Future Hall of Famer Joe Gordon stated that Fain was the greatest fielding first baseman he ever saw.

== Later life ==
Fain became a custom home builder in Georgetown, California, in the 1970s. In 1985 the Placerville, California, police department raided his home where they found several marijuana plants in his possession. He was charged with growing marijuana and sentenced to five years probation. In 1988, the police conducted another raid at his home, where he was found growing another 400 plants of marijuana in a barn used as a grow house. Fain was charged with possession to sale marijuana and was held without bail. He was sentenced to 18 months' imprisonment. In a 1994 interview with The Sacramento Bee, Fain discussed his legal issues, stating that he "knew how to grow the stuff. I was as adept at it as I was in playing baseball", and that he was trying to make a living out of it. He led a mostly reclusive lifestyle with his second wife in his final years, with only the occasional interview.

Fain died October 18, 2001, at the age of 80, in Georgetown, California from complications from leukemia and diabetes.

== See also ==
- List of Major League Baseball batting champions
- List of Major League Baseball annual doubles leaders
- Van Lingle Mungo (song)
