= Lou Kretlow =

American baseball player (1921–2007)

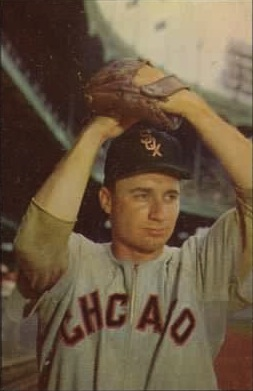
- Kretlow in about 1953
- Pitcher
- Born: June 27, 1921; Apache, Oklahoma, U.S.
- Died: September 12, 2007 (aged 86); Enid, Oklahoma, U.S.
- Batted: Right Threw: Right

MLB debut
- September 26, 1946, for the Detroit Tigers

Last MLB appearance
- September 23, 1956, for the Kansas City Athletics

MLB statistics
- Win–loss record: 27–47
- Earned run average: 4.87
- Strikeouts: 450
- Stats at Baseball Reference

Teams
- Detroit Tigers (1946, 1948–1949); St. Louis Browns (1950); Chicago White Sox (1950–1953); St. Louis Browns (1953); Baltimore Orioles (1954–1955); Kansas City Athletics (1956)

Louis Henry Kretlow (June 27, 1921 – September 12, 2007) was an American professional baseball pitcher who played in the Major Leagues (MLB) for the Detroit Tigers (1946; 1948–49), St. Louis Browns / Baltimore Orioles (1950, 1953, 1954–55), Chicago White Sox (1950–53), and Kansas City Athletics (1956). The native of Apache, Oklahoma, threw and batted right-handed, stood 6 feet 2 inches (1.88 m) tall and weighed 185 pounds (84 kg). Kretlow attended the University of Oklahoma, and appeared in two games for the Sooners. He left college and served in the U.S. Army Air Forces during World War II (1943–45), before beginning his pro career in 1946.

Over ten MLB seasons, Kretlow posted a 27–47 won–lost record in 199 games pitched (104 started), with 22 complete games, three shutouts, 43 games finished, one save, a 4.87 earned run average and 1.659 WHIP. In 785 1/3 innings pitched, he allowed 781 hits, 479 runs (425 earned) and 522 bases on balls. He was credited with 450 strikeouts.

Lou Kretlow died in Enid of natural causes at the age of 86. Kretlow's funeral occurred in Enid, Oklahoma.
