= Art Schult =

American baseball player (1928–2014)

- Outfielder / First baseman
- Born: June 20, 1928; Brooklyn, New York, U.S.
- Died: July 25, 2014 (aged 86); Ocala, Florida, U.S.
- Batted: Right Threw: Right

MLB debut
- May 17, 1953, for the New York Yankees

Last MLB appearance
- May 27, 1960, for the Chicago Cubs

MLB statistics
- Batting average: .264
- Home runs: 6
- Runs batted in: 56
- Stats at Baseball Reference

Teams
- New York Yankees (1953); Cincinnati Redlegs (1956–1957); Washington Senators (1957); Chicago Cubs (1959–1960)

Arthur William "Dutch" Schult (June 20, 1928 – July 25, 2014) was an American professional baseball player. Schult was an outfielder and first baseman who played in 164 games over five seasons for the New York Yankees, Cincinnati Redlegs, Washington Senators and the Chicago Cubs. He stood 6 feet 3 inches (1.91 m) tall, weighed 210 pounds (95 kg), and batted and threw right-handed.

Schult was born in Brooklyn, New York. He attended Georgetown University and was signed by the Yankees as an amateur free agent in 1948. He played for ten seasons in minor league baseball, hitting 136 home runs. However, he spent only one full season in the Majors—1957 with Cincinnati (21 games) and Washington (77 games)—hitting a personal MLB career-high four homers and knocking in 39 runs. His 111 career big-league hits included 24 doubles as well as six homers. He retired after the 1960 campaign.

Schult died on July 25, 2014, at the age of 86.
