= Loren Babe =

American baseball player (1928-1984)

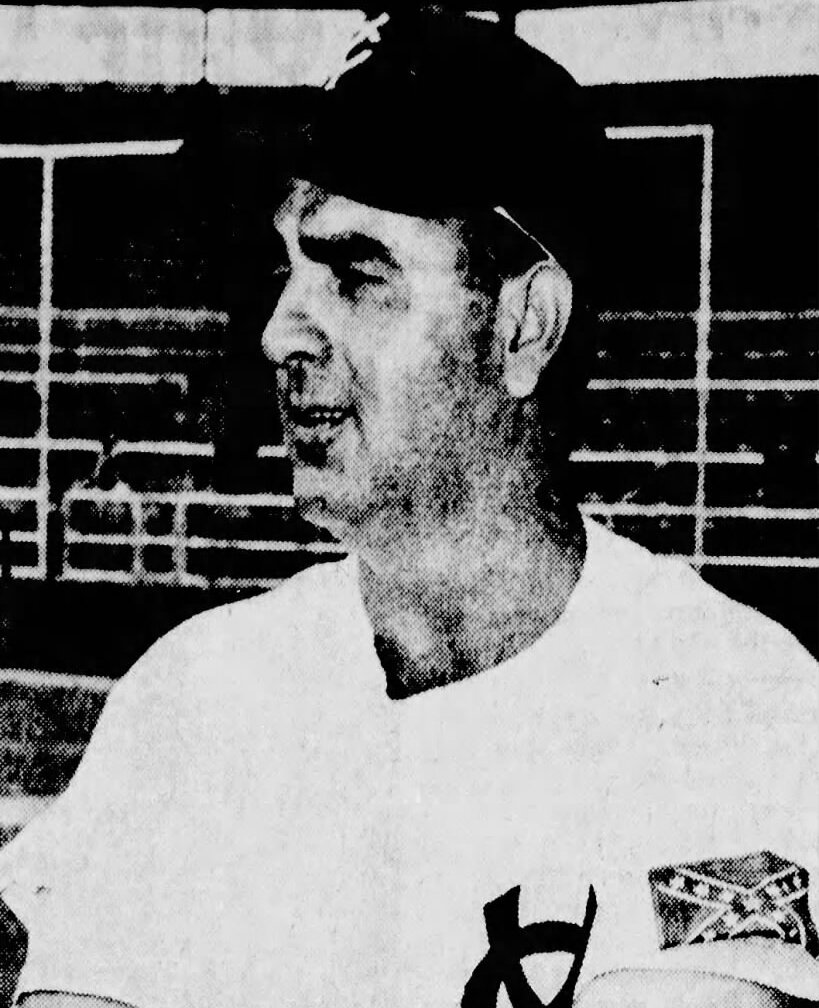
- Babe in 1965
- Third baseman
- Born: January 11, 1928; Pisgah, Iowa, U.S.
- Died: February 14, 1984 (aged 56); Omaha, Nebraska, U.S.
- Batted: Left Threw: Right

MLB debut
- August 19, 1952, for the New York Yankees

Last MLB appearance
- September 27, 1953, for the Philadelphia Athletics

MLB statistics
- Batting average: .223
- Home runs: 2
- Runs batted in: 26
- Stats at Baseball Reference

Teams
- New York Yankees (1952–1953); Philadelphia Athletics (1953)

Loren Rolland Babe (January 11, 1928 – February 14, 1984), nicknamed "Bee Bee", was an American professional baseball infielder, manager, scout and coach.

The native of Pisgah, Iowa, was signed by the New York Yankees in 1945 and was a longtime player and manager in the Bombers' minor league organization. During his two seasons in Major League Baseball, he played for the Yankees and the Philadelphia Athletics. He was traded back to the Yankees after the 1953 season but did not play another major league game. He registered 85 hits in 382 at bats, yielding a .223 batting average. He batted left-handed, threw right-handed, stood 5 feet 10 inches (1.78 m) tall and weighed 180 pounds (82 kg).

After his playing days were over, Babe worked as a minor league manager and Major League Baseball coach. During the mid-1960s, he managed the Toledo Mud Hens, who were at the time the Yankees' AAA affiliate. He was the Yankees' first base coach in 1967, on the staff of skipper Ralph Houk. In 1983, while scouting for the Chicago White Sox, Babe was diagnosed with colon cancer. At the time, he needed 57 days of Major League service to become a vested member of the players' pension plan, which also provides health benefits. The ChiSox named Babe to their coaching staff to enable him to qualify. At the same time the White Sox had another coach, batting instructor Charley Lau, who was battling colon cancer. Babe and Lau both survived the 1983 season while undergoing cancer treatments. Babe died on February 14, 1984, at his home in Omaha, Nebraska. He was 56. Lau, 50, succumbed slightly over a month later, on March 18.

Preceded by Wally Moses	New York Yankees first-base coach 1967	Succeeded by Whitey Ford
