= Tom Gorman (right-handed pitcher) =

American baseball player

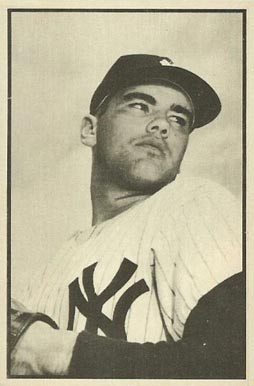
- Pitcher
- Born: January 4, 1925; New York, New York, U.S.
- Died: December 26, 1992 (aged 67); Valley Stream, New York, U.S.
- Batted: Right Threw: Right

MLB debut
- July 16, 1952, for the New York Yankees

Last MLB appearance
- June 23, 1959, for the Kansas City Athletics

MLB statistics
- Win–loss record: 36–36
- Earned run average: 3.77
- Strikeouts: 321
- Saves: 42
- Stats at Baseball Reference

Teams
- New York Yankees (1952–1954); Kansas City Athletics (1955–1959)

Career highlights and awards
- 2× World Series champion (1952, 1953)

Thomas Aloysius Gorman (January 4, 1925 – December 26, 1992) was an American professional baseball player. A right-handed pitcher, he played all or part of eight seasons in Major League Baseball, from 1952 until 1959, for the New York Yankees and Kansas City Athletics. He was listed as 6 feet 1 inch (1.85 m) tall and 190 pounds (86 kg).

Gorman was a native of New York, New York, who grew up in Valley Stream, Long Island. He appeared in 289 MLB games pitched, but only 33 as a starting pitcher. He was credited with 18 saves, second in the American League, as a member of the 1955 Athletics, the team's first season in Kansas City.

In 689⅓ Major League innings pitched, Gorman surrendered 659 hits and 239 bases on balls, with 321 strikeouts.

Gorman died at his Valley Stream, New York, home on December 26, 1992.
