= 1953 Major League Baseball season =

1953 MLB season
- League: American League (AL); National League (NL)
- Sport: Baseball
- Duration: Regular season: April 14 – September 27, 1953 (AL); April 13 – September 27, 1953 (NL); World Series: September 30 – October 5, 1953
- Games: 154
- Teams: 16 (8 per league)
- TV partner(s): ABC, NBC

Regular season
- Season MVP: AL: Al Rosen (CLE); NL: Roy Campanella (BRO)
- AL champions: New York Yankees
- AL runners-up: Cleveland Indians
- NL champions: Brooklyn Dodgers
- NL runners-up: Milwaukee Braves

World Series
- Champions: New York Yankees
- Runners-up: Brooklyn Dodgers
- Finals MVP: Billy Martin (NYY)

MLB seasons
- ← 1952 1954 →

Locations of teams for the 1942–1953 American League seasons
American League
Locations of teams for the 1953–1957 National League seasons
National League

The 1953 major league baseball season began on April 13, 1953. The regular season ended on September 27, with the Brooklyn Dodgers and New York Yankees as the regular season champions of the National League and American League, respectively. In a rematch of the previous season, the postseason began with Game 1 of the 50th World Series on September 30 and ended with Game 6 on October 5. In the fifth iteration of this Subway Series World Series matchup (and a rematch of the previous year), the Yankees defeated the Dodgers, four games to two, capturing their 16th championship in franchise history, concluding their 5-year World Series winning streak, an all-time record.

The 20th All-Star Game was held on July 14 at Crosley Field in Cincinnati, Ohio, home of the Cincinnati Redlegs; the National League won, 5–1.

The Reds lengthened their name to Redlegs due to the escalating Cold War and resulting red scare; as Cincinnati's general manager Gabe Paul noted later, "We wanted to be certain we weren't confused with the 'Russian Reds'."

The 1953 season had the first relocation in professional baseball since the Milwaukee Brewers moved to St. Louis in 1902 to become the Browns, with the Boston Braves, coincidentally, relocating to Milwaukee. It was the first National League relocation since the St. Louis Maroons moved to Indianapolis and became the Indianapolis Hoosiers. This season began a trend of relocation which would occur several times throughout the 1950s and 1960s. This was also the last season for the Browns in St. Louis, moving east to Baltimore the following season to become the Orioles.

On September 13, the Philadelphia Athletics became the seventh team in professional baseball to break the color line when they fielded Bob Trice; the Chicago Cubs became the eighth team just four days later when they fielded future Hall-of-Famer Ernie Banks.

This was also the first regular season of the televised Major League Baseball Game of the Week, originally broadcast on ABC.

== Schedule ==
The 1953 schedule consisted of 154 games for all teams in the American League and National League, each of which had eight teams. Each team was scheduled to play 22 games against the other seven teams of their respective league. This continued the format put in place since the 1904 season (except for 1919) and would be used until 1961 in the American League and 1962 in the National League.

National League Opening Day took place on April 13, featuring the newly relocated Milwaukee Braves and Cincinnati Reds, while American League Opening Day took place the following day, featuring six teams. This was the first season since 1951 that both leagues opened on different days. The final day of the scheduled regular season was on September 27, which saw all sixteen teams play, continuing the trend from 1946. The World Series took place between September 30 and October 5.

== Rule changes ==
The 1953 season saw the following rule changes:

- Players involved in waiver transactions after the June 15 deadline now had to pass through waivers in both leagues, not just in their respective leagues.
  - In addition, waiver claims were prioritized in reverse order of the team’s record to give less-competitive teams the first opportunity to acquire a player.
- Rules regarding signing bonus players were amended:
  - Previously, what defined a bonus player in the majors was $6,000 (equivalent to $72,200 in 2025), Triple-A was $4,000 (equivalent to $48,100 in 2025), and lower level leagues were progressively less. Now, all leagues classified above Class B (including majors) considered more than $4,000 as the line for being considered a bonus player, while Class B and lower placed this line at $3,000 (equivalent to $36,100 in 2025).
  - Bonus players signed to major-league contract were required to spend the first two years on the parent team before he could farmed out; if signed to minor-league contract, the player could not be moved up or down in the farms system for one year.
  - The commissioner was granted the authority to levy fines of $2,000 (equivalent to $24,100 in 2025) or more on clubs and $500 (equivalent to $6,000 in 2025) or more on officials who violated the rule, as well as suspend any guilty parties.
- Rules regarding high-school players were amended. Players would be allowed to sign at any time, but could not play until their original class graduated. A student who left school early could be granted permission to play at any time. Violation of the high-school signing rule could lead to the commissioner declaring the illegally signed player a free agent and levying a fine on the team.
- A new amendment regarding players being optioned or recalled to and from minor leagues was implemented. A major-league player optioned to the minor leagues was required to remain with the minor-league team for at least 10 days (and must be physically fit to play). In addition, any player optioned after July 31 must remain with the minor-league team until the minor-league's season concluded (with an exception granted in case of an open roster spot on the major-league team due to an emergency injury, allowing immediate recalls only in this situation).

== Teams ==
| League | Team | City | Ballpark | Capacity | Manager |
|---|---|---|---|---|---|
| American League | Boston Red Sox | Boston, Massachusetts | Fenway Park | 34,824 | Lou Boudreau |
| American League | Chicago White Sox | Chicago, Illinois | Comiskey Park | 47,400 | Paul Richards |
| American League | Cleveland Indians | Cleveland, Ohio | Cleveland Stadium | 73,811 | Al López |
| American League | Detroit Tigers | Detroit, Michigan | Briggs Stadium | 58,000 | Fred Hutchinson |
| American League | New York Yankees | New York, New York | Yankee Stadium | 67,000 | Casey Stengel |
| American League | Philadelphia Athletics | Philadelphia, Pennsylvania | Connie Mack Stadium | 33,166 | Jimmy Dykes |
| American League | St. Louis Browns | St. Louis, Missouri | Busch Stadium | 30,500 | Marty Marion |
| American League | Washington Senators | Washington, D.C. | Griffith Stadium | 29,731 | Bucky Walters |
| National League | Brooklyn Dodgers | New York, New York | Ebbets Field | 32,111 | Chuck Dressen |
| National League | Chicago Cubs | Chicago, Illinois | Wrigley Field | 36,755 | Phil Cavarretta |
| National League | Cincinnati Redlegs | Cincinnati, Ohio | Crosley Field | 29,439 | Rogers Hornsby |
| National League | Cincinnati Redlegs | Cincinnati, Ohio | Crosley Field | 29,439 | Buster Mills |
| National League | Milwaukee Braves | Milwaukee, Wisconsin | Milwaukee County Stadium | 36,011 | Charlie Grimm |
| National League | New York Giants | New York, New York | Polo Grounds | 54,500 | Leo Durocher |
| National League | Philadelphia Phillies | Philadelphia, Pennsylvania | Connie Mack Stadium | 33,166 | Steve O'Neill |
| National League | Pittsburgh Pirates | Pittsburgh, Pennsylvania | Forbes Field | 34,249 | Fred Haney |
| National League | St. Louis Cardinals | St. Louis, Missouri | Busch Stadium | 30,500 | Eddie Stanky |

== Standings ==
=== American League ===
American League
| Team | W | L | Pct. | GB | Home | Road |
|---|---|---|---|---|---|---|
| New York Yankees | 99 | 52 | .656 | — | 50‍–‍27 | 49‍–‍25 |
| Cleveland Indians | 92 | 62 | .597 | 8½ | 53‍–‍24 | 39‍–‍38 |
| Chicago White Sox | 89 | 65 | .578 | 11½ | 41‍–‍36 | 48‍–‍29 |
| Boston Red Sox | 84 | 69 | .549 | 16 | 38‍–‍38 | 46‍–‍31 |
| Washington Senators | 76 | 76 | .500 | 23½ | 39‍–‍36 | 37‍–‍40 |
| Detroit Tigers | 60 | 94 | .390 | 40½ | 30‍–‍47 | 30‍–‍47 |
| Philadelphia Athletics | 59 | 95 | .383 | 41½ | 27‍–‍50 | 32‍–‍45 |
| St. Louis Browns | 54 | 100 | .351 | 46½ | 23‍–‍54 | 31‍–‍46 |

=== National League ===
National League
| Team | W | L | Pct. | GB | Home | Road |
|---|---|---|---|---|---|---|
| Brooklyn Dodgers | 105 | 49 | .682 | — | 60‍–‍17 | 45‍–‍32 |
| Milwaukee Braves | 92 | 62 | .597 | 13 | 45‍–‍31 | 47‍–‍31 |
| Philadelphia Phillies | 83 | 71 | .539 | 22 | 48‍–‍29 | 35‍–‍42 |
| St. Louis Cardinals | 83 | 71 | .539 | 22 | 48‍–‍30 | 35‍–‍41 |
| New York Giants | 70 | 84 | .455 | 35 | 38‍–‍39 | 32‍–‍45 |
| Cincinnati Redlegs | 68 | 86 | .442 | 37 | 38‍–‍39 | 30‍–‍47 |
| Chicago Cubs | 65 | 89 | .422 | 40 | 43‍–‍34 | 22‍–‍55 |
| Pittsburgh Pirates | 50 | 104 | .325 | 55 | 26‍–‍51 | 24‍–‍53 |

=== Tie games ===
11 tie games (5 in AL, 6 in NL), which are not factored into winning percentage or games behind (and were often replayed again) occurred throughout the season.

==== American League ====
- Chicago White Sox, 2
- Cleveland Indians, 1
- Detroit Tigers, 4
- Philadelphia Athletics, 3

==== National League ====
- Brooklyn Dodgers, 1
- Chicago Cubs, 1
- Cincinnati Redlegs, 1
- Milwaukee Braves, 3
- New York Giants, 1
- Philadelphia Phillies, 2
- St. Louis Cardinals, 3

== Postseason ==
The postseason began on September 30 and ended on October 5 with the New York Yankees defeating the Brooklyn Dodgers in the 1953 World Series in six games.

=== Bracket ===
| World Series |
| AL | New York Yankees | 4 |
| NL | Brooklyn Dodgers | 2 |

== Managerial changes ==
=== Off-season ===
| Team | Former Manager | New Manager |
|---|---|---|
| Pittsburgh Pirates | Billy Meyer | Fred Haney |

=== In-season ===
| Team | Former Manager | New Manager |
|---|---|---|
| Cincinnati Reds | Rogers Hornsby | Buster Mills |

== League leaders ==
=== American League ===
Hitting leaders
| Stat | Player | Total |
|---|---|---|
| AVG | Mickey Vernon (WSH) | .337 |
| OPS | Al Rosen (CLE) | 1.034 |
| HR | Al Rosen (CLE) | 43 |
| RBI | Al Rosen (CLE) | 145 |
| R | Al Rosen (CLE) | 115 |
| H | Harvey Kuenn (DET) | 209 |
| SB | Minnie Minoso (CWS) | 25 |

Pitching leaders
| Stat | Player | Total |
|---|---|---|
| W | Bob Porterfield (WSH) | 22 |
| L | Harry Byrd (PHA) | 20 |
| ERA | Eddie Lopat (NYY) | 2.42 |
| K | Billy Pierce (CWS) | 186 |
| IP | Bob Lemon (CLE) | 286.2 |
| SV | Ellis Kinder (BOS) | 27 |
| WHIP | Eddie Lopat (NYY) | 1.127 |

=== National League ===
Hitting leaders
| Stat | Player | Total |
|---|---|---|
| AVG | Carl Furillo (BRO) | .344 |
| OPS | Duke Snider (BRO) | 1.046 |
| HR | Eddie Mathews (MIL) | 47 |
| RBI | Roy Campanella (BRO) | 142 |
| R | Duke Snider (BRO) | 132 |
| H | Richie Ashburn (PHI) | 205 |
| SB | Bill Bruton (MIL) | 26 |

Pitching leaders
| Stat | Player | Total |
|---|---|---|
| W | Robin Roberts (PHI); Warren Spahn (MIL) | 23 |
| L | Murry Dickson (PIT); Warren Hacker (CHC) | 19 |
| ERA | Warren Spahn (MIL) | 2.10 |
| K | Robin Roberts (PHI) | 198 |
| IP | Robin Roberts (PHI) | 346.2 |
| SV | Al Brazle (STL) | 18 |
| WHIP | Warren Spahn (MIL) | 1.058 |

== Milestones ==
=== Batters ===
- Vic Raschi (NYY):
  - Set an American League record by a pitcher when he hits for seven RBIs in a single game on August 4.

=== Pitchers ===
==== No-hitters ====
- Bobo Holloman (SLB):
  - Holloman threw his first career no-hitter and fourth no-hitter in franchise history, by defeating the Philadelphia Athletics 6–0 on May 6. Holloman walked five and struck out three. It was his first career start.

=== Miscellaneous ===
- Boston Red Sox:
  - Set a modern (1900–present) major league record for most runs scored in the seventh inning, by scoring 17 runs against the Detroit Tigers on June 18.

== Awards and honors ==
=== Regular season ===
Baseball Writers' Association of America Awards
| BBWAA Award | National League | American League |
|---|---|---|
| Rookie of the Year | Jim Gilliam (BRO) | Harvey Kuenn (DET) |
| Most Valuable Player | Roy Campanella (BRO) | Al Rosen (CLE) |
| Babe Ruth Award (World Series MVP) | — | Billy Martin (NYY) |

=== Other awards ===
The Sporting News Awards
| Award | National League | American League |
|---|---|---|
| Player of the Year | — | Al Rosen (CLE) |
| Pitcher of the Year | Warren Spahn (MIL) | Bob Porterfield (WSH) |
| Rookie of the Year | Jim Gilliam (BRO) | Harvey Kuenn (DET) |
| Manager of the Year | — | Casey Stengel (NYY) |
| Executive of the Year | Lou Perini (MIL) | — |

=== Baseball Hall of Fame ===
- Chief Bender
- Dizzy Dean
- Al Simmons
- Bobby Wallace
- Ed Barrow (executive)
- Harry Wright (executive)
- Tom Connolly (umpire)
- Bill Klem (umpire)

== Home field attendance ==
| Team name | Wins | %± | Home attendance | %± | Per game |
|---|---|---|---|---|---|
| Milwaukee Braves | 92 | 43.8% | 1,826,397 | 549.3% | 23,119 |
| New York Yankees | 99 | 4.2% | 1,537,811 | −5.6% | 19,972 |
| Chicago White Sox | 89 | 9.9% | 1,191,353 | −3.3% | 15,274 |
| Brooklyn Dodgers | 105 | 9.4% | 1,163,419 | 6.9% | 14,916 |
| Cleveland Indians | 92 | −1.1% | 1,069,176 | −26.0% | 13,707 |
| Boston Red Sox | 84 | 10.5% | 1,026,133 | −8.0% | 13,502 |
| Detroit Tigers | 60 | 20.0% | 884,658 | −13.8% | 11,198 |
| St. Louis Cardinals | 83 | −5.7% | 880,242 | −3.6% | 11,285 |
| Philadelphia Phillies | 83 | −4.6% | 853,644 | 13.0% | 10,944 |
| New York Giants | 70 | −23.9% | 811,518 | −17.6% | 10,539 |
| Chicago Cubs | 65 | −15.6% | 763,658 | −25.5% | 9,918 |
| Washington Senators | 76 | −2.6% | 595,594 | −14.8% | 7,941 |
| Pittsburgh Pirates | 50 | 19.0% | 572,757 | −16.6% | 7,438 |
| Cincinnati Redlegs | 68 | −1.4% | 548,086 | −9.3% | 7,027 |
| Philadelphia Athletics | 59 | −25.3% | 362,113 | −42.3% | 4,642 |
| St. Louis Browns | 54 | −15.6% | 297,238 | −42.7% | 3,860 |

== Venues ==
With the relocation of the Boston Braves from Boston, Massachusetts to Milwaukee, Wisconsin as the Milwaukee Braves, they leave Braves Field (where they played 38 seasons) and move into Milwaukee County Stadium. They would go on to play there for 13 seasons through 1965 before again relocating.

Two venues were renamed early in the year:

- Shibe Park, home to the Philadelphia Athletics and Philadelphia Phillies, was renamed to Connie Mack Stadium in February, after longtime manager and owner of the Athletics.
- Sportsman's Park, home to the St. Louis Browns and St. Louis Cardinals, was sold on April 9 by Browns owner Bill Veeck to brewing company Anheuser-Busch, whose president and CEO, Gussie Busch, subsequently renamed the park to Busch Stadium (having been vetoed by the Commissioner of Baseball Ford Frick from naming it "Budweiser Stadium").

The St. Louis Browns would play their last game at Busch Stadium on September 27 against the Chicago White Sox, relocating to Baltimore, Maryland at Baltimore Memorial Stadium as the Baltimore Orioles for the start of the 1954 season.

== Media ==
All American League teams (except for the St. Louis Browns) signed a two-year reciprocal agreement that guaranteed the visiting team a percentage of the radio and television broadcast revenue. The result of the Browns not signing said agreement, was that the team was shut out of the television and radio market at home and on the road.

In the National League, while the St. Louis Cardinals forged agreements with the Chicago Cubs and Cincinnati Redlegs, other teams could continue to broadcast games with opponents, even if they had not signed an agreement to do so.

=== Television ===
ABC executive Edgar J. Scherick approached MLB with a Saturday Game of the Week. With fewer outlets than CBS or NBC, ABC needed paid programming (or "anything for bills" as Scherick put it). At first, ABC hesitated at the idea of a nationally televised regular season baseball program, but gave Scherick the green light to sign up teams. Prior to the Sports Broadcasting Act of 1961, antitrust laws only allowed the networks to make deals with individual teams instead of pooling rights directly from a central league authority. Unfortunately, only three (the Philadelphia Athletics, Cleveland Indians, and Chicago White Sox were interested. To make matters worse, Major League Baseball barred the Game of the Week from airing within fifty miles of any big-league city.

The All-Star Game and World Series aired exclusively on NBC.

== See also ==
- 1953 in baseball (Events, Movies, Births, Deaths)
- 1953 All-American Girls Professional Baseball League season
- 1953 Nippon Professional Baseball season
