= 1955 Kansas City Athletics season =

1955 Kansas City Athletics
- League: American League
- Ballpark: Municipal Stadium
- City: Kansas City, Missouri
- Record: 63–91 (.409)
- League place: 6th
- Owners: Arnold Johnson
- Managers: Lou Boudreau
- Radio: KMBC (Merle Harmon, Larry Ray)

The 1955 Kansas City Athletics season was the 55th season for the franchise in MLB's American League, and the first season in Kansas City after playing the previous 54 in Philadelphia. The team won 63 games – only the fifth time in 20 years that they won more than 60 games – and lost 91, finishing sixth in the American League, 33 games behind the AL Champion New York Yankees.

== Offseason ==
In 1954, the Mack family decided to sell the Philadelphia Athletics. Charlie Finley made an offer to purchase the team, but was refused. Clint Murchison also made an offer to purchase the team with plans to relocate to Southern California, but was also refused. On October 12, 1954, the owners approved the sale of the Athletics to Chicago businessman Arnold Johnson, who moved the team from Philadelphia to Kansas City for the 1955 season. Finley would later buy the A's from Johnson's estate in 1960. Murchison's son, Clint Jr., would later become one of the founders of the National Football League's Dallas Cowboys franchise in 1960.

In 1955, the new Kansas City Athletics drew 1,393,054 to Municipal Stadium.

=== Notable transactions ===
- Prior to 1955 season: Bob Davis was signed as an amateur free agent by the Athletics.

=== Spring training ===
The A's and Philadelphia Phillies had played a Philadelphia City Series since 1903. The Kansas City A's returned to Philadelphia at the end of spring training in 1955, and the teams played two games. The A's beat the Phillies in the second game, 10–2, at Wilmington Park, home of the original Wilmington Blue Rocks. Both games were played at Wilmington Park, Wilmington, Delaware, on April 9 and April 10, 1955, immediately prior to the start of the regular season.

== Regular season ==
=== Opening game ===
The first game in Kansas City's Major League history was played at home at Municipal Stadium on Tuesday, April 12, 1955, before 32,147 fans. Facing the Detroit Tigers, the Athletics broke a 2–2 deadlock in the sixth inning with a three-run rally keyed by pinch hitter Don Bollweg's two-run single, and went on to win, 6–2. The A's other batting star was center fielder Bill Wilson, who collected three hits and a base on balls, scoring three runs, in four plate appearances; one of his hits was the first home run in Kansas City MLB annals, a solo blast in the eighth inning. Left-hander Alex Kellner got the victory, while former Cincinnati Reds star Ewell Blackwell pitched three scoreless innings in relief for the save.

==== Starting lineup ====
7	Vic Power	1B
12	Pete Suder	2B
4	Jim Finigan	3B
30	Gus Zernial	LF
34	Bill Renna	RF
32	Bill Wilson	CF
2	Joe DeMaestri	SS
11	Joe Astroth	C
20	Alex Kellner	P

=== Season standings ===
American League
Team	W	L	Pct.	GB	Home	Road
New York Yankees	96	58	.623	—	52‍–‍25	44‍–‍33
Cleveland Indians	93	61	.604	3	49‍–‍28	44‍–‍33
Chicago White Sox	91	63	.591	5	49‍–‍28	42‍–‍35
Boston Red Sox	84	70	.545	12	47‍–‍31	37‍–‍39
Detroit Tigers	79	75	.513	17	46‍–‍31	33‍–‍44
Kansas City Athletics	63	91	.409	33	33‍–‍43	30‍–‍48
Baltimore Orioles	57	97	.370	39	30‍–‍47	27‍–‍50
Washington Senators	53	101	.344	43	28‍–‍49	25‍–‍52

=== Record vs. opponents ===
1955 American League record Sources:
Team	BAL	BOS	CWS	CLE	DET	KCA	NYY	WSH
Baltimore	—	8–14	10–12–1	3–19	9–13	10–12–1	3–19	14–8
Boston	14–8	—	9–13	11–11	13–9	14–8	8–14	15–7
Chicago	12–10–1	13–9	—	10–12	14–8	14–8	11–11	17–5
Cleveland	19–3	11–11	12–10	—	12–10	17–5	13–9	9–13
Detroit	13–9	9–13	8–14	10–12	—	12–10	10–12	17–5
Kansas City	12–10–1	8–14	8–14	5–17	10–12	—	7–15	13–9
New York	19–3	14–8	11–11	9–13	12–10	15–7	—	16–6
Washington	8–14	7–15	5–17	13–9	5–17	9–13	6–16	—

=== Notable transactions ===
- May 11, 1955: Sonny Dixon and cash were traded by the Athletics to the New York Yankees for Enos Slaughter and Johnny Sain.
- May 31, 1955: Clete Boyer was signed as an amateur free agent (bonus baby) by the Athletics.
- May 1955: Al Sima was traded by the Athletics to the Washington Senators for Gus Keriazakos.
- September 10, 1955: Joe Ginsberg was purchased by the Athletics from the Seattle Rainiers.
- September 12, 1955: Glenn Cox was purchased by the Athletics from the Brooklyn Dodgers.

=== Roster ===
1955 Kansas City Athletics
Roster
Pitchers: 26 Charlie Bishop; 36 Ewell Blackwell; 18 Cloyd Boyer; 27 Moe Burtschy; 19 Art Ceccarelli; 8 Glenn Cox; 15 Walt Craddock; 28 Art Ditmar; 24 Sonny Dixon; 17,29 Marion Fricano; 37 Tom Gorman; 14 Johnny Gray; 26 Bill Harrington; 17 Ray Herbert; 20 Alex Kellner; 27 Gus Keriazakos; 29 Mike Kume; 25 Arnie Portocarrero; 16 Vic Raschi; 14 Johnny Sain; 21 Bobby Shantz; 31 Lou Sleater; 29 Bob Spicer; 23 Bob Trice; 15 Ozzie Van Brabant; 16 Lee Wheat	Catchers: 11 Joe Astroth; 10 Eric Mackenzie; 33 Jim Robertson; 22 Billy Shantz; Infielders: 1 Hal Bevan; 3 Don Bollweg; 12 Clete Boyer; 2 Joe DeMaestri; 4 Jim Finigan; 46 Alex George; 6 Spook Jacobs; 8 Dick Kryhoski; 9 Jack Littrell; 1,10 Héctor López; 7 Vic Power; 6 Jerry Schypinski; 12 Pete Suder	Outfielders: 6 Don Plarski; 34 Bill Renna; 3 Tom Saffell; 36,38 Harry Simpson; 33 Enos Slaughter; 31 Bill Stewart; 35 Elmer Valo; 32 Bill Wilson; 30 Gus Zernial	Manager: 5 Lou Boudreau; Coaches: 41 Harry Craft (First Base); 43 Burleigh Grimes (Pitching); 42 Ski Melillo (Third Base); 40 George Susce (Bullpen)

== Player stats ==
= Indicates team leader

=== Batting ===
==== Starters by position ====
Note: Pos = Position; G = Games played; AB = At bats; H = Hits; Avg. = Batting average; HR = Home runs; RBI = Runs batted in

Pos	Player	G	AB	H	Avg.	HR	RBI
C	Joe Astroth	101	274	69	.252	5	23
1B	Vic Power	147	596	190	.319	19	76
2B	Jim Finigan	150	549	135	.255	9	68
SS	Joe DeMaestri	123	457	114	.249	6	37
3B	Héctor López	128	483	140	.290	15	68
LF	Gus Zernial	120	413	105	.254	30	84
CF	Harry Simpson	112	396	119	.301	5	52
RF	Enos Slaughter	108	267	86	.322	5	34

==== Other batters ====
Note: G = Games played; AB = At bats; H = Hits; Avg. = Batting average; HR = Home runs; RBI = Runs batted in

Player	G	AB	H	Avg.	HR	RBI
Elmer Valo	112	283	103	.364	3	37
Bill Wilson	98	273	61	.223	15	38
Bill Renna	100	249	53	.213	7	28
Billy Shantz	79	217	56	.258	1	12
Pete Suder	26	81	17	.210	0	1
Clete Boyer	47	79	19	.241	0	6
Jack Littrell	37	70	14	.200	0	1
Jerry Schypinski	22	69	15	.217	0	5
Dick Kryhoski	28	47	10	.213	0	2
Tom Saffell	9	37	8	.216	0	1
Spook Jacobs	13	23	6	.261	0	1
Bill Stewart	11	18	2	.111	0	0
Don Plarski	8	11	1	.091	0	0
Alex George	5	10	1	.100	0	0
Don Bollweg	12	9	1	.111	0	2
Jim Robertson	6	8	2	.250	0	0
Hal Bevan	3	3	0	.000	0	0
Eric Mackenzie	1	1	0	.000	0	0

=== Pitching ===
==== Starting pitchers ====
Note: G = Games played; IP = Innings pitched; W = Wins; L = Losses; ERA = Earned run average; SO = Strikeouts

Player	G	IP	W	L	ERA	SO
Alex Kellner	30	162.2	11	8	4.20	75
Bobby Shantz	23	125.0	5	10	4.54	58
Arnie Portocarrero	24	111.1	5	9	4.77	34
Vic Raschi	20	101.1	4	6	5.42	38
Glenn Cox	2	2.1	0	2	30.86	2

==== Other pitchers ====
Note: G = Games pitched; IP = Innings pitched; W = Wins; L = Losses; ERA = Earned run average; SO = Strikeouts

Player	G	IP	W	L	ERA	SO
Art Ditmar	35	175.1	12	12	5.03	79
Art Ceccarelli	31	123.2	4	7	5.31	68
Cloyd Boyer	30	98.1	5	5	6.22	32
Ray Herbert	23	87.2	1	8	6.26	30
Johnny Gray	8	26.2	0	3	6.41	11
Mike Kume	6	23.2	0	2	7.99	7
Walt Craddock	4	15.0	0	2	7.80	9
Gus Keriazakos	5	11.2	0	1	12.34	8

==== Relief pitchers ====
Note: G = Games pitched; W = Wins; L = Losses; SV = Saves; ERA = Earned run average; SO = Strikeouts

Player	G	W	L	SV	ERA	SO
Tom Gorman	57	7	6	18	3.55	46
Bill Harrington	34	3	3	2	4.11	26
Johnny Sain	25	2	5	1	5.44	12
Lou Sleater	16	1	1	0	7.71	11
Marion Fricano	10	0	0	0	3.15	5
Moe Burtschy	7	2	0	0	10.32	9
Charlie Bishop	4	1	0	0	5.40	4
Bob Trice	4	0	0	0	9.00	2
Lee Wheat	3	0	0	0	22.50	0
Ewell Blackwell	2	0	1	0	6.75	2
Bob Spicer	2	0	0	0	33.75	2
Ozzie Van Brabant	2	0	0	0	18.00	1
Sonny Dixon	2	0	0	0	16.20	0
Bill Wilson	1	0	0	0	0.00	1

== Awards and honors ==
All-Star Game

- Jim Finigan, third baseman, starter
- Vic Power, reserve

== Farm system ==
Level	Team	League	Manager
AAA	Columbus Jets	International League	Nick Cullop
A	Savannah Athletics	Sally League	Clyde Kluttz
B	Lancaster Red Roses	Piedmont League	Hank Biasatti
C	Hot Springs Bathers	Cotton States League	Joe Lutz and Mickey O'Neil
C	Burlington A's	Provincial League	Vince Plumbo
D	Welch Miners/Marion A's	Appalachian League	Herb Mancini
D	Seminole Oilers	Sooner State League	Charles Hopkins and Al Evans

LEAGUE CHAMPIONS: Lancaster
Welch franchise transferred to Marion and renamed, July 14, 1955
