= 1956 Kansas City Athletics season =

1956 Kansas City Athletics
- League: American League
- Ballpark: Municipal Stadium
- City: Kansas City, Missouri
- Record: 52–102 (.338)
- League place: 8th
- Owners: Arnold Johnson
- Managers: Lou Boudreau
- Radio: KMBC (Merle Harmon, Larry Ray)

The 1956 Kansas City Athletics season, the team's 56th in the American League and second in Kansas City, involved the A's finishing eighth in the American League with a record of 52 wins and 102 losses, 45 games behind the World Series champion New York Yankees.

== Offseason ==
- March 2, 1956: Tommy Lasorda was purchased by the Athletics from the Brooklyn Dodgers.

== Regular season ==
=== Season standings ===
American League
Team	W	L	Pct.	GB	Home	Road
New York Yankees	97	57	.630	—	49‍–‍28	48‍–‍29
Cleveland Indians	88	66	.571	9	46‍–‍31	42‍–‍35
Chicago White Sox	85	69	.552	12	46‍–‍31	39‍–‍38
Boston Red Sox	84	70	.545	13	43‍–‍34	41‍–‍36
Detroit Tigers	82	72	.532	15	37‍–‍40	45‍–‍32
Baltimore Orioles	69	85	.448	28	41‍–‍36	28‍–‍49
Washington Senators	59	95	.383	38	32‍–‍45	27‍–‍50
Kansas City Athletics	52	102	.338	45	22‍–‍55	30‍–‍47

=== Record vs. opponents ===
1956 American League record Sources:
Team	BAL	BOS	CWS	CLE	DET	KCA	NYY	WSH
Baltimore	—	6–16	9–13	5–17	13–9	15–7	9–13	12–10
Boston	16–6	—	14–8	13–9–1	12–10	12–10	8–14	9–13
Chicago	13–9	8–14	—	15–7	13–9	14–8	9–13	13–9
Cleveland	17–5	9–13–1	7–15	—	11–11	17–5	10–12	17–5
Detroit	9–13	10–12	9–13	11–11	—	16–6	12–10	15–7–1
Kansas City	7–15	10–12	8–14	5–17	6–16	—	4–18	12–10
New York	13–9	14–8	13–9	12–10	10–12	18–4	—	17–5
Washington	10–12	13–9	9–13	5–17	7–15–1	10–12	5–17	—

=== Notable transactions ===
- April 16, 1956: Lee Wheat, Tom Saffell and cash were traded by the Athletics to the Brooklyn Dodgers for Tim Thompson.
- April 16, 1956: Johnny Groth was purchased by the Athletics from the Washington Senators.
- May 1956: Marion Fricano and $60,000 were traded by the Athletics to the Toronto Maple Leafs for Jack Crimian.
- June 14, 1956: Moe Burtschy, Bill Renna and cash were traded by the Athletics to the New York Yankees for Lou Skizas and Eddie Robinson.
- July 11, 1956: Tommy Lasorda was traded by the Athletics to the New York Yankees for Wally Burnette.
- August 17, 1956: Joe Ginsberg was traded by the Athletics to the Baltimore Orioles for Hal Smith.
- August 25, 1956: Enos Slaughter was selected off waivers from the Athletics by the New York Yankees.

=== Roster ===
1956 Kansas City Athletics
Roster
Pitchers: 14 Bill Bradford; 9,53 George Brunet; 23 Wally Burnette; 36 Moe Burtschy; 19 Art Ceccarelli; 16 Glenn Cox; 15 Walt Craddock; 24 Jack Crimian; 28 Art Ditmar; 39 Carl Duser; 37 Tom Gorman; 26 Bill Harrington; 17 Troy Herriage; 20 Alex Kellner; 18,23 Lou Kretlow; 23 Tommy Lasorda; 14 Jack McMahan; 25 Arnie Portocarrero; 26,34 José Santiago; 21 Bobby Shantz; 19 Bob Spicer	Catchers: 11 Joe Astroth; 9 Joe Ginsberg; 32 Hal Smith; 22 Tim Thompson; Infielders: 1 Mike Baxes; 12 Clete Boyer; 2 Joe DeMaestri; 4 Jim Finigan; 6 Spook Jacobs; 10 Héctor López; 8 Rance Pless; 7 Vic Power; 25 Eddie Robinson	Outfielders: 39 Johnny Groth; 31 Dave Melton; 6 Al Pilarcik; 36 Jim Pisoni; 34 Bill Renna; 38 Harry Simpson; 35 Lou Skizas; 33 Enos Slaughter; 35 Elmer Valo; 30 Gus Zernial	Manager: 5 Lou Boudreau; Coaches: 41 Harry Craft; 42 Ski Melillo; 40 George Susce

== Player stats ==
= Indicates team leader

=== Batting ===
==== Starters by position ====
Note: Pos = Position; G = Games played; AB = At bats; H = Hits; Avg. = Batting average; HR = Home runs; RBI = Runs batted in

Pos	Player	G	AB	H	Avg.	HR	RBI
C	Tim Thompson	92	268	73	.272	1	27
1B	Vic Power	127	530	164	.309	14	63
2B	Jim Finigan	91	250	54	.216	2	21
SS	Joe DeMaestri	133	434	101	.233	6	39
3B	Héctor López	151	561	153	.273	18	69
LF	Gus Zernial	109	272	61	.224	16	44
CF	Al Pilarcik	69	239	60	.251	4	22
RF	Harry Simpson	141	543	159	.293	21	105

==== Other batters ====
Note: G = Games played; AB = At bats; H = Hits; Avg. = Batting average; HR = Home runs; RBI = Runs batted in

Player	G	AB	H	Avg.	HR	RBI
Lou Skizas	83	297	94	.316	11	39
Johnny Groth	95	244	63	.258	5	37
Enos Slaughter	91	223	62	.278	2	23
Joe Ginsberg	71	195	48	.246	1	12
Eddie Robinson	75	172	34	.198	2	12
Hal Smith	37	142	39	.275	2	24
Clete Boyer	67	129	28	.217	1	4
Mike Baxes	73	106	24	.226	1	5
Spook Jacobs	32	97	21	.216	0	5
Rance Pless	48	85	23	.271	0	9
Bill Renna	33	48	13	.271	2	5
Jim Pisoni	10	30	8	.267	2	5
Joe Astroth	8	13	1	.077	0	0
Elmer Valo	9	9	2	.222	0	2
Dave Melton	3	3	1	.333	0	0

=== Pitching ===
= Indicates league leader

==== Starting pitchers ====
Note: G = Games pitched; IP = Innings pitched; W = Wins; L = Losses; ERA = Earned run average; SO = Strikeouts

Player	G	IP	W	L	ERA	SO
Art Ditmar	44	254.1	12	22	4.42	126
Wally Burnette	18	121.1	6	8	2.89	54
Lou Kretlow	25	118.2	4	9	5.31	61
Alex Kellner	20	91.2	7	4	4.32	44
Glenn Cox	3	23.1	0	2	4.24	6
Walt Craddock	2	9.1	0	2	6.75	8
Carl Duser	2	6.0	1	1	9.00	5

==== Other pitchers ====
Note: G = Games pitched; IP = Innings pitched; W = Wins; L = Losses; ERA = Earned run average; SO = Strikeouts

Player	G	IP	W	L	ERA	SO
Tom Gorman	52	171.1	9	10	3.83	56
Troy Herriage	31	103.0	1	13	6.64	59
Jack McMahan	23	61.2	0	5	4.82	13
Tommy Lasorda	18	45.1	0	4	6.15	28
José Santiago	9	21.2	1	2	8.31	9
Art Ceccarelli	3	10.0	0	1	7.20	2
George Brunet	6	9.0	0	0	7.00	5
Arnie Portocarrero	3	8.0	0	1	10.13	2

==== Relief pitchers ====
Note: G = Games pitched; W = Wins; L = Losses; SV = Saves; ERA = Earned run average; SO = Strikeouts

Player	G	W	L	SV	ERA	SO
Bobby Shantz	45	2	7	9	4.35	67
Jack Crimian	54	4	8	3	5.51	59
Bill Harrington	23	2	2	1	6.45	14
Moe Burtschy	21	3	1	0	3.95	18
Bob Spicer	2	0	0	0	19.29	0
Bill Bradford	1	0	0	0	9.00	0

== Farm system ==
Level	Team	League	Manager
AAA	Columbus Jets	International League	Nick Cullop
A	Columbia Gems	Sally League	Hank Biasatti
B	Abilene Blue Sox	Big State League	Al Evans
C	Crowley Millers	Evangeline League	Vince Plumbo
C	Pocatello Bannocks	Pioneer League	Joe Lutz and Lou Stringer
D	Fitzgerald A's	Georgia–Florida League	Red Treadway
D	Grand Island Athletics	Nebraska State League	Art Mazmanian
D	Seminole Oilers	Sooner State League	Burl Storie

LEAGUE CHAMPIONS: Seminole
