= 2018 in baseball =

The following are the baseball events of the year 2018 throughout the world.

== Champions ==
=== Major League Baseball ===
Wild Card Games (ALWC, NLWC)
4	NY Yankees	1
5	Oakland	0
4	Chicago Cubs	0
5	Colorado	1

Division Series (ALDS, NLDS)
1	Boston	3
4	NY Yankees	1
American League
2	Houston	3
3	Cleveland	0
1	Milwaukee	3
5	Colorado	0
National League
2	LA Dodgers	3
3	Atlanta	1

League Championship Series (ALCS, NLCS)
1	Boston	4
2	Houston	1
1	Milwaukee	3
2	LA Dodgers	4

World Series
AL1	Boston	4
NL2	LA Dodgers	1

=== Other champions ===
- Minor League Baseball
  - AAA
    - Championship: Memphis Redbirds (St. Louis Cardinals)
      - International League: Durham Bulls (Tampa Bay Rays)
      - Pacific Coast League: Memphis Redbirds (St. Louis Cardinals)
    - Mexican League:
      - Leones de Yucatán (first season)
      - Sultanes de Monterrey (second season)
  - AA
    - Eastern League; New Hampshire Fisher Cats (Toronto Blue Jays)
    - Southern League: Jackson Generals (Arizona Diamondbacks)
    - Texas League: Tulsa Drillers (Los Angeles Dodgers)
  - High A
    - California League: Rancho Cucamonga Quakes (Los Angeles Dodgers)
    - Carolina League: Buies Creek Astros (Houston Astros)
    - Florida State League: Fort Myers Miracle (Minnesota Twins)
  - A
    - Midwest League: Bowling Green Hot Rods (Tampa Bay Rays)
    - South Atlantic League: Lexington Legends (Kansas City Royals)
  - Short Season A
    - New York–Penn League: Tri-City ValleyCats (Houston Astros)
    - Northwest League: Eugene Emeralds (Chicago Cubs)
  - Advanced Rookie
    - Appalachian League: Elizabethton Twins (Minnesota Twins)
    - Pioneer League: Great Falls Voyagers (Chicago White Sox)
  - Rookie
    - Arizona League: AZL Dodgers (Los Angeles Dodgers)
    - Dominican Summer League: DSL Rays 1 (Tampa Bay Rays)
    - Gulf Coast League: GCL Tigers West (Detroit Tigers)
  - Arizona Fall League: Peoria Javelinas
- Independent baseball leagues
  - American Association: Kansas City T-Bones
  - Atlantic League: Sugar Land Skeeters
  - Can-Am League: Sussex County Miners
  - Empire League: Puerto Rico Islanders
  - Frontier League: Joliet Slammers
  - Pacific Association: San Rafael Pacifics
  - Pecos League: Bakersfield Train Robbers
  - United Shore League: Birmingham Bloomfield Beavers
- Amateur
  - College
    - College World Series: Oregon State
    - NCAA Division II: Augustana
    - NCAA Division III: University of Texas at Tyler
    - NAIA: Southeastern
    - Junior College Baseball World Series: Chipola College
    - Cape Cod League: Wareham Gatemen
  - Youth
    - Intermediate League World Series: West Seoul Little League (Seoul, South Korea)
    - Junior League World Series: Shing-Ming Junior Little League (Taoyuan, Chinese Taipei)
    - Little League World Series: Honolulu Little League (Honolulu, Hawaii)
    - Senior League World Series: Pariba Little League (Willemstad, Curacao)

=== International competition ===
- National Teams
  - Asian Games: South Korea
  - U-15 Baseball World Cup: USA
  - U-23 Baseball World Cup: Mexico
  - Central American and Caribbean Games: Puerto Rico
  - Haarlem Baseball Week: Japan
  - Super 6 Tournament: Netherlands
  - Women's Baseball World Cup: Japan
  - World University Baseball Championship: Japan
- International club team competitions
  - Caribbean Series: Criollos de Caguas
  - European Cup: Curaçao Neptunus
  - Latin American Series: Tigres de Chinandega
- Domestic Summer Leagues
  - British League: London Mets
  - Dutch Baseball League: Curaçao Neptunus
  - French League: Huskies de Rouen
  - Finnish Baseball Championship: Helsinki Mets
  - German League: Bonn Capitals
  - Irish Baseball League: Dublin City Hurricanes
  - Italian Baseball League: UnipolSai Bologna
  - Japan Series: Fukuoka SoftBank Hawks
    - Pacific League: Fukuoka SoftBank Hawks
    - Central League: Hiroshima Toyo Carp
  - Korean Series: SK Wyverns
  - Spanish League: Tenerife Marlins
  - Swedish League: Leksand Lumberjacks
  - Taiwan Series: Lamigo Monkeys
- Domestic Winter Leagues
  - Australian Baseball League: Brisbane Bandits
  - Colombian League: Leones de Montería
  - Cuban National Series: Alazanes de Granma
  - Dominican League: Águilas Cibaeñas
  - Mexican Pacific League: Tomateros de Culiacán
  - Nicaraguan League: Tigres de Chinandega
  - Panamanian League: Caballos de Coclé
  - Puerto Rican League: Criollos de Caguas
  - Venezuelan League: Caribes de Anzoátegui

== Awards and honors ==
=== Major League Baseball ===
- Baseball Hall of Fame honors
- Major Awards
- MVP Award
  - American League: Mookie Betts (BOS)
  - National League: Christian Yelich (MIL)
- Cy Young Award
  - American League: Blake Snell (TB)
  - National League: Jacob deGrom (NYM)
- Manager of the Year Award
  - American League: Bob Melvin (OAK)
  - National League: Brian Snitker (ATL)
- Rookie of the Year Award
  - American League: Shohei Ohtani (LAA)
  - National League: Ronald Acuña Jr. (ATL)
- Postseason awards
- World Series MVP: Steve Pearce (BOS)
- League Championship Series MVP
  - American League: Jackie Bradley Jr. (BOS)
  - National League: Cody Bellinger (LAD)
- Babe Ruth Award: David Price (BOS)
- Regular season awards
- All-Star Game MVP: Alex Bregman (HOU)
- Comeback Player of the Year Award
  - American League: David Price (BOS)
  - National League: Jonny Venters (ATL)
- Reliever of the Year Award
  - American League: Edwin Díaz (SEA)
  - National League: Josh Hader (MIL)
- Edgar Martínez Award: Khris Davis (OAK)
- Hank Aaron Award
  - American League: J. D. Martinez (BOS)
  - National League: Christian Yelich (MIL)
- Luis Aparicio Award
  - Ronald Acuña Jr. (ATL)
  - Jesús Aguilar (MIL)
- Roberto Clemente Award: Yadier Molina (STL)

Others

- Ford C. Frick Award: Bob Costas (Sportscaster)
- J. G. Taylor Spink Award: Jayson Stark (Sportswriter)
- Roy Campanella Award: Chase Utley (LAD)
- Warren Spahn Award: Blake Snell (TB)
- Willie Mac Award: Will Smith (SF)

Baseball America awards

- MLB Player of the Year: Mike Trout (LAA)
- MLB Rookie of the Year: Shohei Ohtani (LAA)
- MLB Manager of the Year: Bob Melvin (OAK)
- MLB Executive of the Year: Dave Dombrowski (BOS)
- MLB Organization of the Year: Milwaukee Brewers
- MiLB Player of the Year Award: Vladimir Guerrero Jr. (New Hampshire / Buffalo [TOR])
- MiLB Team of the Year Award: Bowling Green (Midwest [TB])

Baseball Digest Awards

- Player of the Year Award: Mookie Betts (BOS)
- Pitcher of the Year Award: Jacob deGrom (NYM)

Sporting News awards

- Player of the Year Award: Mookie Betts (BOS)
- Starting pitcher of the Year Award
  - American League: Chris Sale (BOS)
  - National League: Jacob deGrom (NYM)
- Relief pitcher of the Year Award
  - American League: Edwin Díaz (SEA)
  - National League: Josh Hader (MIL)
- Rookie of the Year Award
  - American League: Miguel Andújar (NYY)
  - National League: Ronald Acuña Jr. (ATL)
- Comeback Player of the Year Award
  - American League: David Price (BOS)
  - National League: Matt Kemp (LAD)
- Manager of the Year Award
  - American League: Bob Melvin (OAK)
  - National League: Craig Counsell (MIL) / Brian Snitker (ATL)
- Players Choice Awards
- Outstanding Players
  - American League: Mookie Betts (BOS)
  - National League: Christian Yelich (MIL)
- Outstanding Pitchers
  - American League: Blake Snell (TB)
  - National League: Jacob deGrom (NYM)
- Outstanding Rookies
  - American League: Miguel Andújar (NYY)
  - National League: Ronald Acuña Jr. (ATL)
- Comeback Players of the Year
  - American League: Michael Brantley (CLE)
  - National League: Matt Kemp (LAD)
- Choice Man of the Year: Curtis Granderson (TOR/MIL)
- Choice Player of the Year: J. D. Martinez (BOS)
- Silver Slugger Awards

American League			National League
Player	Team	Position	Player	Team
José Abreu	(CWS)	First baseman	Paul Goldschmidt	(AZ)
Jose Altuve	(HOU)	Second baseman	Javier Báez	(CHC)
José Ramírez	(CLE)	Third baseman	Nolan Arenado	(COL)
Francisco Lindor	(CLE)	Shortstop	Trevor Story	(COL)
Mookie Betts	(BOS)	Outfielder	Nick Markakis	(ATL)
J. D. Martinez	(BOS)	Outfielder	David Peralta	(AZ)
Mike Trout	(LAA)	Outfielder	Christian Yelich	(MIL)
Salvador Pérez	(KC)	Catcher	J. T. Realmuto	(MIA)
J. D. Martinez	(BOS)	Designated hitter/pitcher	Germán Márquez	(COL)

- Gold Glove Awards

American League			National League
Player	Team	Position	Player	Team
Dallas Keuchel	(HOU)	Pitcher	Zack Greinke	(AZ)
Salvador Pérez	(KC)	Catcher	Yadier Molina	(STL)
Matt Olson	(OAK)	First baseman	Freddie Freeman; Anthony Rizzo	(ATL) (CHC)
Ian Kinsler	(LAA/BOS)	Second baseman	DJ LeMahieu	(COL)
Matt Chapman *	(OAK)	Third baseman	Nolan Arenado	(COL)
Andrelton Simmons	(LAA)	Shortstop	Nick Ahmed	(AZ)
Alex Gordon	(KC)	Left fielder	Corey Dickerson	(PIT)
Jackie Bradley Jr.	(BOS)	Center fielder	Ender Inciarte	(ATL)
Mookie Betts	(BOS)	Right fielder	Nick Markakis	(ATL)

* Platinum Glove Award Winner

Sources: 2018 MLB Awards

=== Minor League Baseball ===
- International League MVP :
  - Joey Meneses (Lehigh Valley IronPigs [PHI])
- Pacific Coast League MVP :
  - Josh Fuentes (Albuquerque Isotopes [COL])
- Eastern League MVP :
  - Cavan Biggio (New Hampshire Fisher Cats [TOR])
- Southern League MVP :
  - Corey Ray (Biloxi Shuckers [MIL])
- Texas League Player of the Year :
  - Joey Curletta (Arkansas Travelers [SEA])
- Texas League Pitcher of the Year :
  - Logan Allen (San Antonio Missions [SD])
- Joe Bauman Home Run Award :
  - A. J. Reed (Fresno Grizzlies [HOU])
- All-Star Futures Game :
  - Larry Doby Award – Taylor Trammell (Daytona Tortugas [CIN])
- Arizona Fall League :
  - Joe Black Award: Keston Hiura (Peoria Javelinas [SEA])
  - Dernell Stenson Sportsmanship Award: Cole Tucker (Surprise Saguaros [PIT])
- USA Today MiLB Player of the Year :
  - Vladimir Guerrero Jr. (New Hampshire / Buffalo [TOR])

== Events ==
=== January ===
- January 12 – The Chicago Cubs and Kris Bryant avoid salary arbitration, agreeing to a $10.85 million salary for the 2018 season, setting a new record for a first-time arbitration eligible player.
- January 24 – Chipper Jones, Vladimir Guerrero, Jim Thome, and Trevor Hoffman are elected into the Hall of Fame by the Baseball Writers' Association of America.
- January 31 – Mookie Betts prevailed in his arbitration case against the Boston Red Sox, as he will earn $10.5 million in 2018, the largest salary won in a hearing by a first-year arbitration-eligible player.

=== February ===
- February 23 – Spring training begins for all 30 Major League Baseball clubs in the warm climates of Florida and Arizona. Of the 30 teams, 15 spend spring training in Florida while the other 15 do it in Arizona.

=== March ===
- March 6 – The Arizona Diamondbacks announced the introduction of a bullpen car, the first in MLB since 1995.
- March 15- Augie Garrido the all-time winningest head coach in NCAA baseball history dies at the age of 79 in Garrido's 47 year coaching career he retired as the all-time winningest head coach in college baseball history with 1,975 career victories.
- March 29 – The Major League Baseball regular season began with Chicago Cubs and the Miami Marlins playing at Marlins Park. In the game, the Cubs' Ian Happ hit a home run on the first pitch of the season, off the Marlins' José Ureña as the Cubs defeated Miami 8–4. Happ became the first player since Dwight Evans in 1986 to hit a home run on the first pitch of a regular season.

=== April ===
- April 5- Prior to the Twins-Mariners game at Target Field, Seattle Mariners pitcher James Paxton is attacked by a bald eagle during the national anthem.
- April 8 – New York Yankees outfielder Giancarlo Stanton strikes out five times in an 8–7 loss against the Baltimore Orioles. Coupled with an earlier five strike-out game on April 3 against the same Orioles, Stanton becomes the first major leaguer ever to accomplish the dubious feat twice in a season and the second after Alex Rios to do so in a career.
- April 10 – Roberto Osuna of the Toronto Blue Jays became the youngest pitcher to record his 100th career save at age 23, surpassing Francisco Rodriguez to reach that milestone mark.
- April 12 – Joe Mauer of the Minnesota Twins recorded his 2,000th career hit against the Chicago White Sox, becoming the 287th player in major league history to reach that mark.
- April 19 – The Cincinnati Reds dismissed manager Bryan Price following a poor 3–15 start to begin the season, which is its worst start since a 2–16 record in their 1931 season. Price, who also coached for Cincinnati between 2010 and 2013, posted a managerial record of 279 wins and 387 losses from 2014 to 2018. Bench coach Jim Riggleman was appointed to finish out the remainder of the season as the interim manager.
- April 21 – At Oakland-Alameda County Coliseum, Oakland Athletics pitcher Sean Manaea no-hit the Boston Red Sox, 3–0, striking out 10 batters along the way. The no-hitter was the first by an Athletic pitcher since Dallas Braden hurled a perfect game against the Tampa Bay Rays in the 2010 season. Besides, the Red Sox entered the game with a winning percentage of .894, making them the team with the highest winning percentage ever to be no-hit.

=== May ===
- May 4 – Los Angeles Angels slugger Albert Pujols joined the 3,000 hit club with a single off Seattle Mariners pitcher Mike Leake in the fifth inning during the Angels' 5–0 win over Seattle. Pujols already has surpassed 600 home runs, two accomplishments reached only by Hank Aaron, Willie Mays and Alex Rodriguez.
- May 6 – Washington Nationals pitcher Max Scherzer recorded 15 outs via strikeout in 6 1/3 innings of work against the Philadelphia Phillies, becoming the first pitcher ever to accomplish the feat.
- May 8 – At the Rogers Centre, Seattle Mariners pitcher James Paxton no-hit the Toronto Blue Jays, 5–0. A native of Ladner, British Columbia, Paxton became the first Canadian to pitch a Major League Baseball no-hitter in his home country. In addition, Paxton is the second Canadian to throw a no-hitter in Major League Baseball history. The first was Toronto's Dick Fowler, who led the Philadelphia Athletics to a 1–0 victory over the St. Louis Browns at Shibe Park on September 9, 1945.
- May 11 – Former Pittsburgh Pirates outfielder Andrew McCutchen is greeted with a standing ovation in his first game at Pirates' PNC Park since being traded to the San Francisco Giants. McCutchen hit a double in five at-bats, and the Pirates won 11–2.
- May 19 – The Tampa Bay Rays reintroduced the concept of the opener in Major League Baseball when they gave pitcher Sergio Romo his first career start, after his first 588 games came in relief duties. Romo struck out Zack Cozart, Mike Trout, and Justin Upton in a perfect inning in that first start, as the Rays went on to win the Angeles Angels, 5–3, at Angel Stadium. The next day, Romo would open again, throwing a second scoreless inning, though the Rays lost, 5–2. Romo only made three more starts for the remaining of the season, but the Rays finished up using the opener dozens of times and continued to do so in 2019. Afterwards, several other clubs ended up trying out the strategy.

=== June ===
- June 4 :
  - Auburn University pitcher Casey Mize is selected first overall by the Detroit Tigers in the 2018 MLB draft.
  - New York Yankees outfielder Aaron Judge sets a major league record by striking out eight times in a doubleheader against the Detroit Tigers, including a five-strikeout game in the nightcap.
- June 18 – Florida State University announced that Seminoles' head baseball coach Mike Martin will retire at the end of the 2019 season, his 40th at the helm. The 74-year old Martin, who became the all-time winningest baseball coach in college history after surpassing Augie Garrido in May, has posted a 1,987–713–4 record and .736 winning percentage.
- June 22 – Joe Jordano, the winningest head baseball coach in University of Pittsburgh history, announces his resignation after 11 years of service with for the Pittsburgh Panthers and an overall record of 826–638–2 (.530).

=== July ===
- July 3 – Los Angeles Dodgers pitcher Clayton Kershaw earned his first win since April 15, leading his team to an 8–3 victory over the visiting Pittsburgh Pirates. The Dodgers belted five home runs, including a pair by Max Muncy. As a result, Muncy reached 20 home runs in his 183rd at-bats of 2018, making him the fastest player to get there in Dodgers season history, while breaking the record set by Cody Bellinger who did it in 189 at-bats in 2017, according to Elias Sports Bureau research.
- July 14 – The St Louis Cardinals dismissed manager Mike Matheny after seven seasons despite taking them to a collective record of 591–474 and four playoff appearances from 2012 to 2015, including the 2013 World Series, even though the team have had no playoff appearances since 2016. Matheny was replaced by bench coach Mike Shildt, who will serve as interim manager for the rest of the season. In addition, the Cardinals relieved hitting coach John Mabry and assistant hitting coach Bill Mueller of their duties.
- July 17 – Houston Astros teammates Alex Bregman and George Springer hit back-to-back home runs in the top of the 10th inning, to lead the American League to an 8–6 victory over the National League in the 89th All-Star Game played at Nationals Park in Washington D.C. There were a game-record 10 home runs hit by both teams, four more than the previous mark set in 1971, and as many as the previous six All-Star Games combined. Bregman, a first-time All-Star, earned MVP honors.
- July 20 – St. Louis Cardinals infielder Matt Carpenter hit three home runs and two doubles in just six innings, tying the major league record for the most extra-base hits in a game, and the Cardinals crushed the Chicago Cubs, 18–5, at Wrigley Field. Overall, Carpenter went 5 for 5 and drove in seven runs at Wrigley Field, becoming the 14th player in major league history to collect five extra bases in a game, as well as the first to do it for the Cardinals.
- July 26 – The Philadelphia Phillies tied the franchise record for home runs in a game, and overpowered the host Cincinnati Reds, 9–4, in the opener of a four-game series. Nick Williams, Rhys Hoskins and Maikel Franco each hit two of Philadelphia's record-tying seven home runs, while Carlos Santana added a two-run homer as the NL East leaders tied the mark set on September 8, 1998, against the New York Mets.
- July 29 – Former Major League Baseball players Vladimir Guerrero, Trevor Hoffman, Chipper Jones, Jack Morris, Jim Thome and Alan Trammell were enshrined into the Baseball Hall of Fame and Museum in Cooperstown, New York.
- July 31 – The Washington Nationals set a franchise-record for most runs scored in their 25–4 victory over the New York Mets at Nationals Park. The Nationals set the franchise scoring mark dating to their days when they started as the Montreal Expos in 1969. For the Mets, it was the most-lopsided loss in their 57-season history, worse than a 26–7 pounding by the Philadelphia Phillies in 1985. Former Met Daniel Murphy hit two home runs and drove in six runs and Ryan Zimmerman added a two-run homer, while Anthony Rendon collected four RBI and pitcher Tanner Roark cleared the bases with a three-run double. Steven Matz got only two outs and allowed seven runs in the shortest start of his career. Matz was followed by six relievers, including infielder José Reyes in the first pitching appearance of his career, in which he allowed six runs and two homers in just one inning of work.

=== August ===
- August 1 – New York Mets infielder José Reyes hit two home runs in a 5–3 loss to the Washington Nationals at Nationals Park, after allowing two homers as an emergency pitcher in his previous game. With his feat, Reyes became the first player in modern Major League Baseball history to allow multiple home runs and then hit multiple homers in his team's next game. According to the Elias Sports Bureau, the only other player in major league history to accomplish this feat is Hall of Famer Cap Anson, who allowed two homers for the Chicago White Stockings on August 5, 1884, and then hit three home runs on August 6 of that season.
- August 4 – Minnesota Twins pitcher Oliver Drake made history by pitching for his fifth team of the season. According to Elias Sports Bureau research, Drake, who also pitched for the Milwaukee Brewers, Cleveland Indians, Anaheim Angels and Toronto Blue Jays in 2018, is the first pitcher in major league history to pitch for five teams in the same season.
- August 7 :
  - In defeating the Seattle Mariners 11–4 at Globe Life Park in Arlington, Texas Rangers pitcher Bartolo Colón, in his sixth try, set the Major League record for wins by a Latin American pitcher, the 246th of his career. After surviving back-to-back second-inning home runs by Nelson Cruz and Kyle Seager, Colón was aided by home runs from Jurickson Profar, Rougned Odor and Adrián Beltré. Moreover, Colón pitched seven innings for the victory breaking a tie he had shared with Dennis Martínez. His last victory had been on June 30 against the Chicago White Sox.
  - In Minor League Baseball action, Pittsburgh Pirates prospects Kevin Newman and Jacob Stallings both hit for the cycle for the Triple-A Indianapolis Indians in a 12–5 win over the Lehigh Valley IronPigs. The feat marked the second time in baseball history in which teammates have hit for the cycle in the same game. The other time also happened this season when San Francisco Giants prospects Gio Brusa and Jalen Miller did it for Class-A San Jose Giants on April 12. The feat has never been accomplished in Major League Baseball. Just twice have two players hit for the cycle on the same day in the majors: Bobby Veach of the Detroit Tigers and George Burns of the New York Giants on September 17, 1920, and Stephen Drew of the Arizona Diamondbacks and Adrián Beltré of the Seattle Mariners on September 1, 2008.
- August 9 – Mookie Betts of the Boston Red Sox hit for the cycle for first time in his career in an 8–5 loss to the Toronto Blue Jays at Rogers Centre. Besides, Betts became the 21st player to hit a cycle in Red Sox history and the first to do it in this season. Betts singled and scored a run in the first inning, tripled in the second and doubled in the fourth against Blue Jays starter Ryan Borucki. After walking in the sixth, Betts hit a one-out drive off reliever Ken Giles in the ninth for his 27th home run of the season.
- August 12 – David Bote of the Chicago Cubs hits an "ultimate walk-off grand slam home run" (with two outs, two strikes on batter, and his team down by three runs in the bottom of the final inning) to defeat the Washington Nationals 4–3 at Wrigley Field. Bote is the first to accomplish this feat as a pinch hitter since Roger Freed of the St. Louis Cardinals did it in 1979.
- August 13 – At SunTrust Park, 20-year-old rookie Ronald Acuña hit leadoff home runs in both games of a day-night doubleheader to lead the Atlanta Braves to a sweep of the Miami Marlins, 9–1 and 6–1, respectively, while hitting three of his four career leadoff homers in a span of three days. Furthermore, Acuña became just the fourth player in Major League Baseball history to accomplish the feat, and certainly the youngest. Before that, Harry Hooper of the Boston Red Sox did it during a pair of games against the Washington Senators on May 20, 1913, Oakland Athletics' Rickey Henderson against the Cleveland Indians on July 5, 1993, and Baltimore Orioles' Brady Anderson on August 21, 1999.
- August 14 – Ronald Acuña became the youngest player in Major League Baseball history to hit home runs in five consecutive games, hitting a leadoff homer on the first pitch and adding a three-run long ball in the seventh inning, helping the Atlanta Braves beat the Miami Marlins 10–6 at SunTrust Park. Besides hitting his third consecutive leadoff home run, Acuña became only the second player in major league history to lead off three consecutive games with home runs since Brady Anderson of the Baltimore Orioles led off four consecutive games with home runs in 1996.
- August 16 – The New York Mets set a franchise record for runs, defeating the Philadelphia Phillies, 24–4, in the first game of a doubleheader at Citizens Bank Park. José Bautista led the offensive, going 4-for-5 with a grand slam and a career-high seven runs batted in. In addition, the Mets scored more than 15 runs in consecutive games for the first time in the team's 57-year history. They beat the Baltimore Orioles, 16–5, in their previous game. On July 31, the Mets were crushed by the Washington Nationals, 25–4. The last time a major league team scored 24+ runs and allowed 24+ runs in the same season was in 1894, done by the Boston Beaneaters, Chicago Colts, Philadelphia Phillies and Pittsburgh Pirates, according to the Elias Sports Bureau.
- August 17 – At PNC Park, the Chicago Cubs tie a Major League record by turning seven double plays in defeating the Pittsburgh Pirates, 1–0. Aided by Kyle Schwarber's second-inning home run, Cole Hamels pitch seven innings for the victory and induces a double play in each of the first four innings and one more in the sixth. The seventh double play ends the game as David Bote fields David Freese's ground ball to force Corey Dickerson at third base, then throws to first for the final out. According to the Elias Sports Bureau, the Cubs became only the third team to turn seven double plays in a nine-inning game, joining the 1942 New York Yankees and the 1969 Houston Astros.
- August 22 – Ryan Zimmerman hit his 11th career walk-off home run in the bottom of ninth inning, leading the Washington Nationals to an 8–7 come from behind victory over the Philadelphia Phillies at Nationals Park. The homer off Phillies right-hander Seranthony Domínguez moved Zimmerman into a tie with David Ortiz and Tony Pérez for the eighth-most walk-off home runs in MLB history, according to Elias Sports Bureau research. Only Albert Pujols (12) has more walk-off homers than Zimmerman among active players.
- August 25 :
  - Edwin Díaz became the youngest pitcher to collect 50 saves in a season, preserving yet one-run lead in the Seattle Mariners 4–3, 10-inning victory over the host Arizona Diamondbacks at Chase Field. At 24 years of age, Díaz surpassed Craig Kimbrel who was 25 when posted 50 saves for the Atlanta Braves in 2013. Besides, Díaz joined an exclusive group of pitchers with his 50th save, becoming the 14th pitcher in Major League history to reach that milestone in a season and only the 2nd pitcher ever with at least 50 saves and 100 strikeouts. In addition, he set a Mariners' single-season saves record and, with 32 games remaining on the team's schedule, is 12 saves shy of equaling the single-season Major League record of 62 saves, established by Francisco Rodríguez in 2008 while pitching for the Los Angeles Angels.
  - Linda Goldbloom, a California woman, is struck in the head by a foul ball during a game between the Los Angeles Dodgers and the San Diego Padres. She dies on August 29, 2018.
- August 26 – Blake Snell continued to build his American League Cy Young Award candidacy, as he led the Tampa Bay Rays to a 9–1 win over the Boston Red Sox at Tropicana Field. Snell allowed one run on only two hits, while striking out eight and walking two in six innings, to improve his record to 16–5 and lowering his ERA to 2.05. In addition, the Rays extended their winning streak to eight and became the first team this season to sweep the Red Sox, owners of the best record in the majors at 90–42.
- August 28 – The St. Louis Cardinals announced that interim manager Mike Shildt is going to stay in the job beyond the present season. Shildt is slated to receive a three-year contract in addition to having the interim label removed. Since taking the helm of a club that was sitting just one game over .500 (47–46) under Mike Matheny, Shildt guided the Cardinals to a 26–12 record, as the club returned firmly back in contention.
- August 29 – Christian Yelich became the eighth Milwaukee Brewers player to hit for the cycle and tied a club record with six hits, in the 13–12, 10-inning victory over the host Cincinnati Reds at Great American Ball Park. Jesús Aguilar then broke an 11–11 tie with a two-run homer in the top of the 12th inning. Yelich completed his feat by hitting singles in the first and third innings, a go-ahead, two-run home run in the fifth, one double in the sixth, a tying RBI triple in the seventh, and another single in the ninth to push his batting average up to .319, which leads the National League.
- August 30 – The Houston Astros agreed to a contract extension with manager A. J. Hinch, signing him a four-year extension that is guaranteed through the 2022 season. Hinch, 44, guided the Houston franchise to its first World Series title last season. His contract had been set to expire after this year with a club option for 2019.

=== September ===
- September 2 – Ronald Acuña belted his seventh leadoff home run of the season and scored the tie-breaking run in a four-run eighth inning, to propel the Atlanta Braves to a 5–1 victory over the Pittsburgh Pirates at SunTrust Park. The first-inning shot was his 23rd overall and tied the franchise record for leadoff homers that Marquis Grissom set in 1996. The homer also moved Acuña into a tie for the second-most leadoff homers in a rookie season, joining Nomar Garciaparra (1997) and Hanley Ramírez (2006). Chris Young holds the single-season record for a rookie with nine leadoff homers in 2007.
- September 5 :
  - The Boston Red Sox rallied from a 7–1 deficit after seven innings to beat the Atlanta Braves at SunTrust Park, 9–8, and swept the three-game series in a matchup of division leaders. Boston scored six times in the eight, sending 12 batters to the plate in the inning and batting about 40 minutes against four Atlanta's relievers. Despite that, Freddie Freeman hit a tie-breaking home run in the bottom of the inning. And then Brandon Phillips stepped on the plate at the top of the ninth. Phillips, who was playing his first game with the Red Sox, waited little time and belted a two-out, two-run homer on the first pitch he saw. Phillips had already scored two runs earlier in the game, and also made a nice catch at second base. This season, MLB teams were 487–0 when leading by six runs or more in the eight inning.
  - Ronald Acuña hit his eighth leadoff home run of the season in the Atlanta Braves 9–8 loss to the Boston Red Sox, setting a Braves franchise record for single-season leadoff home runs. Acuña was tied with Marquis Grissom, who hit seven leadoff homers for Atlanta in 1996. Acuña also moved within one homer of the Major League Baseball rookie record, set by Chris Young with the 2007 Arizona Diamondbacks. New York Yankees' Alfonso Soriano set the MLB record with 13 leadoff homers in 2003.
  - Trevor Story hit three home runs in his first three at-bats, including one projected at 505 feet (153.924 m), and the Colorado Rockies beat the San Francisco Giants, 5–3, at Coors Field. Story, an All-Star shortstop, became the first player to hit the longest home run according to Statcast since the tracking technology was introduced to all thirty MLB stadiums in 2015. Overall, Story finished with a combined 1,380 feet (420.824 m) of homer distance, setting another Statcast record for a three-home run game.
- September 12 :
  - David Price pitched seven innings of shutout ball to beat the Toronto Blue Jays 1–0 at Fenway Park, leading the Boston Red Sox to a milestone victory while collecting its 100th victory of the season. A night after becoming the first major league team this year to clinch a playoff spot, Boston moved a season-high 54 games above .500 for the first time since 1946. Rafael Devers scored the lone run of the game in the bottom of the fifth inning on a wild pitch by Aaron Sanchez. Price allowed just three singles with no walks and seven strikeouts. He was replaced by Steven Wright to start the eighth inning and Craig Kimbrel closed in the ninth and was credited for the save. Furthermore, Alex Cora became the first rookie manager to win 100 games in a season since Dusty Baker did it with the 1993 Giants. The Red Sox now need only to go 6–10 the rest of the season, to break the franchise record of 105 wins, set in 1912. Boston also won 101 games in its 1915 season.
  - Houston Astros third baseman Alex Bregman notched his 50th double, 100th run scored and 100th RBI of the season, during the fifth inning of a 5–4 victory that completed a sweep of the Detroit Tigers at Comerica Park. In addition, Bregman, who belted his 30th homer of the year against the Chicago White Sox on September 8, became the first third baseman in Major League history to hit 50 doubles and 30 home runs in a season.
- September 15 :
  - The Cleveland Indians clinched its third straight American League Central title with a 15–0 rout of the Detroit Tigers at Progressive Field. Cleveland starter Mike Clevinger combined with four relievers for the two-hit shutout, while all regulars scored at least one run on 18 hits, including home runs of Francisco Lindor, Michael Brantley and Yonder Alonso.
  - Yasiel Puig posted career highs with three home runs and seven runs batted in, leading the Los Angeles Dodgers to a 17–4 defeat over the St. Louis Cardinals at Busch Stadium. It was a significant follow-up to the night before, when he belted two homers against the Cardinals. In addition, Puig became the first Dodger player to hit five home runs in two games since Shawn Green did it in 2002.
- September 18 :
  - The Baltimore Orioles lost to the Toronto Blue Jays at Oriole Park, 6–4, as the Orioles lost their 108th game, the most in the club's 65-year history since moving to Baltimore in 1954. The 1988 Orioles opened the season 0–21, setting a major league for the most consecutive losses, and held the previous team's record for losses with a 54–107 finish. The overall franchise record for defeats is 111, set by the 1939 St. Louis Browns in its 1939 season, which could also be eclipsed by this year's team. During the game, the Orioles also became the first American professional sports team to wear specially designed jerseys with all lettering in Braille in their National Federation of the Blind night, in recognition of the organization moving its headquarters to Baltimore 40 years ago.
  - Blake Snell pitched five scoreless inning to become the major leagues' first 20-game winner in two seasons, combining with three relievers to shutout the Texas Rangers, 4–0, at Globe Life Park. Snell allowed only one hit along with five strikeouts and two walks, while recording his 200th strikeout of the season and an overall ERA of 1.97. Besides, Snell (20–5) tied the Tampa Bay record for victories in a season, set by David Price in 2012, and has at least two more starts to set a new team's record.
- September 20 :
  - Mookie Betts was 4 for 5 with two doubles, a home run and three runs scored, driving in five runs as the Boston Red Sox came back to beat the host New York Yankees, 11–6, wrapping up its third consecutive AL East Division for the first time in franchise history. At 104–49, led by first year manager Alex Cora, the Sox need at least to go 2–7 over their final nine games to set a franchise record with 106 victories. The 1912 Boston team, which was led by Hall of Fame outfielders Tris Speaker and Harry Hooper and 34-game winning pitcher Smoky Joe Wood, went 105–47 en route to the 1912 World Series championship. The Yankees go deep twice in the loss giving them 247 home runs on the season, breaking the franchise record of 245 home runs set back in 2012.
  - Down 8–2 entering the bottom of the 9th inning, the Toronto Blue Jays score 7 runs, capped off by back-to-back 2-out home runs by Lourdes Gurriel Jr. and Justin Smoak to stun the Tampa Bay Rays 9–8. The comeback tied the largest 9th inning rally in Blue Jays history.
- September 21 :
  - The Texas Rangers announced that manager Jeff Banister was relieved of his duties. Bench coach Don Wakamatsu was appointed to finish out the remainder of the season as the interim manager. The decision came with 10 games remaining in the season and less than three years since Banister replaced Ron Washington. Banister was named the American League Manager of the Year in his first season for managing the Rangers to the first of back-to-back AL West Division titles in both 2015 and 2016. Nevertheless, after two consecutive losing seasons the team went backward, traded several veterans, and entered a rebuilding phase. Banister, who posted a 325–312 overall record, is under contract for the next season, but he will earn his reported $950K salary while someone else takes the helm for the Rangers. Banister became the third manager in the major leagues to be dismissed this season, along with Mike Matheny of the St. Louis Cardinals and Bryan Price of the Cincinnati Reds.
  - Yuli Gurriel belted two home runs, including a first-inning grand slam and a career-high seven runs batted in, as the Houston Astros clinched their third playoff spot in four seasons with an 11–3 win over the Los Angeles Angels at Minute Maid Park. Besides, it was a special night for the Gurriel brothers, who starred for the Cuba National team before defecting to the United States in February 2016, as Yuli's younger brother, Lourdes Gurriel Jr., hit two home runs for the Toronto Blue Jays in an 11–3 loss to the Tampa Bay Rays. According to the Elias Sports Bureau, Yuli and Lourdes became the first pair of brothers to hit multi-home runs on the same day in Major League Baseball history. The brothers will play one another for the first time as big leaguers next week when Houston visit Toronto.
  - The Boston Red Sox posted their 47th comeback win of the season, this one by a score of 7–5 over the Cleveland Indians at Progressive Field, to tie a team record with its 105th win of the season. With most of the regular roster on the bench, Rafael Devers smashed his 18th homer, while Sam Travis and Tzu-Wei Lin hit their first career home runs, as the trio drove in the seven runs of the team. Besides, the 2018 Red Sox tied the record set by the 1912 Boston team in game No. 154, which was the length of a season 106 years ago.
- September 22 :
  - The Atlanta Braves clinched its first National League East Division title since 2013, with Mike Foltynewicz pitching a no-hitter into the seventh inning in a 5–3 victory over the Philadelphia Phillies at SunTrust Park. Foltynewicz held the Phillies hitless until Odúbel Herrera singled to begin the seventh inning, allowing two runs on two hits and three walks in 7 1/3 innings of work. Johan Camargo and Freddie Freeman both hit two-RBI singles, while Ender Inciarte was 2 for 3 and scored three runs. Phillies starter Jake Arrieta lasted just two innings, as he allowed four runs, four hits and three walks in the shortest outing of his nine-year career.
  - Aaron Hicks hit a walk-off RBI-double that scored Didi Gregorius in the bottom of the eleventh inning, as the New York Yankees secured their place in the playoffs with a 3–2 win over the Baltimore Orioles at Yankee Stadium. Previously, Hicks and Luke Volt both hit solo home runs in the second inning. At 95–59, the Yankees matched their most wins since 2012 and will make their 54th postseason appearance, 21 more than any other club in Major League Baseball history.
- September 24 – The Boston Red Sox beat the Baltimore Orioles at Fenway Park, 6–2, to set a franchise season record with its 106th victory of the season, surpassing the 1912 Red Sox team, Fenway Park's inaugural season. In the process, Boston secured the best record in all of MLB, thus clinching home-field advantage throughout the postseason including the World Series, as the Sox will open the Division Series at Fenway on October 5 against the winner of the AL wild-card game. Besides, the Orioles (45–111) matched the franchise record for defeats in a season, which was posted by the 1939 St. Louis Browns (43–111).
- September 25 :
  - The Houston Astros reached 100 wins for the second straight season, beating the Toronto Blue Jays 4–1. In the process, the Oakland Athletics fell short in a 10–8 loss to the Seattle Mariners and Houston clinched another American League West title, sending the second-place Oakland into a wild-card matchup with the New York Yankees. The Astros will open the AL Division Series at home against the Cleveland Indians on October 5.
  - Washington Nationals pitcher Max Scherzer recorded his 18th win of the season in a 9–4 victory over the Florida Marlins at Nationals Park, while striking out 10 batters that gave him an even 300 strikeouts on the season. As a result, Scherzer became just the 17th pitcher since 1901 to reach the selected 300-strikeout plateau, joining Randy Johnson (six times), Nolan Ryan (six), Walter Johnson (three), Sandy Koufax (three), Curt Schilling (three), Sam McDowell (two), Pedro Martínez (two), J. R. Richard (two), Rube Waddell (two), Vida Blue, Steve Carlton, Bob Feller, Clayton Kershaw, Mickey Lolich, Mike Scott and Chris Sale.
- September 26 :
  - The Milwaukee Brewers became the latest team to clinch a playoff berth with a 2–1 victory over the host St. Louis Cardinals. Travis Shaw hit a pair of RBI singles, as the Brewers completed a three-game sweep at Busch Stadium, the first for St. Louis since 2009. Christian Yelich, who walked all five times he came to bat, scored both runs. Milwaukee starter Jhoulys Chacin gave up one run on just one hit over five innings, while four relievers combined for four shutout innings as the Brewers held the Cardinals to a season-low two hits. This playoff berth will be the fifth in franchise history. The Brewers last made the postseason in 2011, when they came within two wins of reaching the World Series before falling to the eventual champion Cardinals.
  - Boston Red Sox outfielder Mookie Betts stole his 30th base of the season in a 19–3 victory over the Baltimore Orioles at Fenway Park, to become just the second player in franchise history to join the 30–30 club, being the other Jacoby Ellsbury, who accomplished the feat in 2011. Betts, who leads the American League with a .343 batting average and has slugged a career-high 33 home runs, also became the fifth player in MLB history to hit at least .333 in a 30/30 season, joining Willie Mays (1957), Ellis Burks (1996), Larry Walker (1997) and Vladimir Guerrero (2002).
  - The Toronto Blue Jays announced that manager John Gibbons would not return to his position in 2019. Gibbons, who recently signed an extension that included a guarantee for the 2019 campaign, guided the club to solid campaigns in 2015 and 2016, including an American League East title in the first of those years. Overall, Gibbons carries a 791–787 record in 1,578 games as the Blue Jays manager in two stints spanning 2004–2018. That places Gibbons second only to Cito Gaston in games managed (1,731) and wins (894) in franchise history. Furthermore, the Blue Jays added that Gibbons can decide whether to take a new role in the organization.
  - Colorado Rockies pitcher Germán Márquez tied a modern-day major league record with eight consecutive strikeouts to begin a game on his way to setting the franchise record for most strikeouts in a single season. Márquez, who fanned 11 Philadelphia Phillies batters in seven innings of a 14–0 victory, matched Jim Deshaies of the Houston Astros (1986) and Jacob deGrom of the New York Mets (2014) by striking out the first eight batters he faced. Previously, Mickey Welch of the New York Gothams started a game with nine straight strikeouts on August 28, 1884. Overall, Márquez recorded his 221 strikeout of the season, breaking the franchise record set by Ubaldo Jiménez in 2010.
  - The Chicago Cubs secured their fourth straight playoff berth with a victory over the Pittsburgh Pirates at Wrigley Field, 7–6, to keep their NL Central lead.
- September 28 – The Colorado Rockies clinched a playoff spot with a 5–2 win over the Washington Nationals, making it back to back playoff appearances for the first time in franchise history.
- September 29 :
  - Manny Machado delivered a tie-breaking, eighth-inning RBI triple, as the Los Angeles Dodgers secured at least a Wild Card berth with a 10–6 win over the San Francisco Giants at AT&T Park. The victory gave Los Angeles a tie for the division lead with the Colorado Rockies, heading into the regular season finale for both teams. Afterwards, with the Milwaukee Brewers and Dodgers even with the Chicago Cubs and Rockies, respectively, the NL Central and NL West divisions will be decided on September 30.
  - Gleyber Torres and Giancarlo Stanton homered as the New York Yankees set a major league record for most home runs in a season, in way to an 8–5 victory over the Boston Red Sox at Fenway Park for their 100th win this year. The Yankees entered the game tied with the 1997 Seattle Mariners with 264 homers after hitting four in the previous game. Moreover, New York joined Boston and the Houston Astros to win 100 or more games this year, making the American League the first circuit to have a trio of 100-win teams in the same season.
- September 30 – The 162-game regular season calendar was not enough to decide the NL Central and NL West divisions races, as the Chicago Cubs, Milwaukee Brewers, Colorado Rockies and Los Angeles Dodgers won their respective games the last day of the season. As a result, the stage was set for a pair of tiebreaker games on October 1 to determine the National League Central and NL West champions, as well as the NL Wild Card Game matchup. It is the first time in MLB history that two tiebreaker games were staged on the same day.

=== October ===
- October 1 – The Milwaukee Brewers beat the Chicago Cubs in the NL Central tiebreaker, 3–1, while the Los Angeles Dodgers defeated the Colorado Rockies. 5–2, in the NL West tiebreaker. Afterwards, Colorado will travel to Wrigley Field to face the Cubs in the NL playoff wild-card game.
- October 2 :
  - The Colorado Rockies outlasted the Chicago Cubs, 2–1, in 13 innings at Wrigley Field, marking the longest Wild Card Game in MLB history in terms of innings and time (4:55 h). The Rockies advanced to the NL Division Series, where they will face the Milwaukee Brewers at Miller Park.
  - The Minnesota Twins announced that manager Paul Molitor was relieved of his duties after four seasons with the team. Molitor, who in the 2017 season was named the American League Manager of the Year, signed a three-year extension at the end of that season. Improving from a 59–103 record in 2016 to 85–77 in 2017, 2018 was a disappointing season for the Twins, who fell out of contention by early July and finished 78–84. With two years left on his contract, Molitor may be offered another position within the organization.
- October 3 :
  - In the AL Wild Card Game, the New York Yankees posted a 7–2 victory over the Oakland Athletics. New York advanced to the AL Division Series and will face the Boston Red Sox at Fenway Park.
  - Following a 47–115 record in the season, the Baltimore Orioles announced that neither field manager Buck Showalter and general manager Dan Duquette, whose contracts expire at the end of October, will not return in 2019. Showalter took the helm during the 2010 season, while Duquette was hired as general manager after the 2011 campaign. Duquette, who previously worked for the Montreal Expos and the Boston Red Sox, was the architect of the rosters that Showalter guided Baltimore to playoff appearances in three seasons, being named the MLB Executive of the Year in 1992 with the Expos and 2014 with the Orioles. A three-time AL League Manager of the Year, Showalter was part of an Orioles turnaround that included three postseason trips between 2012 and 2016. In 2012, the Orioles won 93 games to end a streak of 14 consecutive losing seasons and earned a Wild Card berth. After missing the playoffs in 2013, the team won the AL Division title in 2014 for their first postseason victory in 17 years, sweeping the Detroit Tigers before being swept by the Kansas City Royals in the AL Championship Series. After that, Baltimore posted an 81–81 record in 2015 and earned another wild card appearance in 2016. After two subpar years, Showalter completed his 20th season as a big league manager, which includes stints with the New York Yankees (1992–1995), Arizona Diamondbacks (1998–2000) and Texas Rangers (2003–2006). In each of those cases, Showalter had a track record of turning losing franchises into winners, particularly the expansion Diamondbacks, guiding them to the 2001 World Series championship. His career record is 1,551–1,517, for a .506 winning percentage.
- October 4 :
  - Mike Moustakas drove in Christian Yelich with a two-out single in the bottom of the 10th inning, as the Milwaukee Brewers beat the Colorado Rockies, 3–2, in Game 1 of the NLDS.
  - The Los Angeles Dodgers shutout the Atlanta Braves, 6–0, in Game 1 of the NLDS, behind a seven-inning pitching performance from Hyun-Jin Ryu and early homers by Joc Pederson and Max Muncy.
- October 5 :
  - J. D. Martinez hit a three-run homer off J. A. Happ in the first inning and Chris Sale combined with five relievers, as the Boston Red Sox beat the New York Yankees at Fenway Park, 5–4, in Game 1 of the AL Division Series. The Red Sox jumped out to a 5–0 lead in the third inning, only for their bullpen to nearly blow it once Sale departed in the sixth. Closer Craig Kimbrel was credited with the save, striking out the last three Yankees hitters after an allowing a solo home run to Aaron Judge to open the inning. It was also the first postseason meeting between the historic rivals since the epic seven-game AL Championship Series matchup in 2004.
  - The Houston Astros exploded in Game 1 of the ALDS in a reminiscent of their previous playoff opening contest against the Boston Red Sox in 2017. This time, Astros starter Justin Verlander prevailed in a pitching duel with Corey Kluber and was backed by four home runs in a 7–2 victory over and the Cleveland Indians at Minute Maid Park.
  - Clayton Kershaw allowed only two hits in eight innings, as the Los Angeles Dodgers shut out the Atlanta Braves at Dodger Stadium, 2–0, to take a 2–0 lead in the NL Division Series.
  - Besides, the Milwaukee Brewers also took a 2–0 advantage, shutting out the Colorado Rockies 4–0 at Miller Park, in Game 2 of their NLDS series.
- October 6 :
  - Gary Sánchez belted two home runs and drove in four runs, and the New York Yankees evened the AL Division Series at a game apiece with a 6–2 victory over the Boston Red Sox at Fenway Park. Masahiro Tanaka pitched five innings, allowing one run on three hits and earned the win. Once more, Boston starter David Price struggled in the playoffs and lasted only 1 2/3 innings, while dropping to 0–9 in 10 postseason starts.
  - Houston Astros starter Gerrit Cole struck out 12 and allowed just one run in seven innings, to defeat the Cleveland Indians in the ALDS Game 2 at Minute Maid Park, 3–1, leaving them on the brink of elimination.
- October 7 :
  - The Milwaukee Brewers beat the Colorado Rockies at Coors Field, 6–0, to sweep their NL Division Series and advance to their first NL Championship Series since the 2011 season. Milwaukee will play against the winner of the Atlanta Braves-Los Angeles Dodgers series, starting on October 12 at Miller Park.
  - 20-year-old rookie Ronald Acuña passed Mickey Mantle to become the youngest MLB player to hit a grand slam in the postseason, as the Atlanta Braves broke a 19-inning scoreless drought in the NL Division Series, while defeating the Los Angeles Dodgers at SunTrust Park, 6–5, to win Game 3 of the best-of-five set. At age 21, Mantle smashed a grand slam in the 1953 World Series. In addition, Acuña became the fourth rookie to homer in the postseason, joining Gil McDougald (1951), Ricky Ledee (1999) and Paul Goldschmidt (2011).
  - Uni-President 7-Eleven Lions pitcher Ryan Verdugo hurled a 1–0 perfect game against the Chinatrust Brothers, to become the first pitcher to accomplish the feat in the history of the Chinese Professional Baseball League. To make everything more interesting, the winning run came on a lead-off, walk-off home run by third baseman Kuo Fu-Lin. Verdugo, a former Kansas City Royals prospect, retired all 27 batters he faced on 92 pitches while striking out eight in the process.
- October 8 :
  - Brock Holt hit for the cycle and drove in five runs to lead the Boston Red Sox to a 16–1 rout of the host New York Yankees in pivotal Game 3 of the AL Division Series. Boston starter Nathan Eovaldi pitched seven innings of one-run ball, allowing five hits and striking out seven without walking a batter, while Holt completed the first cycle in MLB postseason history. In the loss, Yankees backup catcher Austin Romine becomes just the second position player to ever pitch in a postseason game. The Sox took a 2–1 advantage in the best-of-five series.
  - The Houston Astros advanced to the AL Championship Series for the second straight year, after completing an AL Division Series sweep of the Cleveland Indians with an 11–3 win at Progressive Field, as Cleveland was beaten in the first round for the second year in a row. George Springer homered twice, Carlos Correa hit a three-run homer, Marwin González added a two-run double, and Houston's bullpen combined for four scoreless innings to back a solid pitching performance by Dallas Keuchel. The Astros will await for the winner of the Boston Red Sox-New York Yankees series for a chance to play for another AL title.
  - Manny Machado hit a three-run homer and David Freese, as the Los Angeles Dodgers advanced to their third consecutive NL Championship Series with a 6–2 Game 4 victory over the Atlanta Braves at SunTrust Park. Los Angeles moved on to face the Milwaukee Brewers in the best-of-seven NL Championship Series. The Braves lost its nine straight playoff appearances, their last victory coming 17 years ago, a four-game sweep over the Houston Astros in the 2001 NL Division Series.
- October 9 :
  - The Boston Red Sox beat the New York Yankees, 4–3, for their second straight win at Yankee Stadium, claiming the AL Division Series in four games and advancing to face the defending World Champions Houston Astros in AL Championship Series.
  - The Tampa Bay Rays extended the contract of manager Kevin Cash through the 2024 season, plus a club option for 2025. Cash had one year remaining on a five-year, $5 million deal he signed when he replaced Joe Maddon before the 2015 season. Cash guided the Rays to their best season since 2013, as they finished third in the American League East Division with a 90–72 record, which was good for sixth overall in the 15-team league despite setting club records with 54 players, 31 pitchers and 23 rookies. Utilizing a variety of unorthodox means of deploying the roster, Cash used relief pitchers to begin games, setting a team record with 17 different starting pitchers, or openers, if is the case. As a result, the pitching staff ranked third in the major leagues with a 3.50 earned run average and also set a major league record with 824 1/3 relief innings pitched.
- October 12 – The Milwaukee Brewers beat the Los Angeles Dodgers at Miller Park, 6–5, giving Milwaukee a 12th straight victory in the playoffs and a 1–0 lead in the best-of-seven National League Championship Series. Dodgers ace Clayton Kershaw lasted only three innings, allowing five runs on six hits and two walks, for the shortest post-season outing of his career. Brewers relief pitcher Brandon Woodruff led off the third inning with a long home run to right-center field, tying the game 1–1. Woodruff, who was credited with the win, also joined New York Giants' Rosy Ryan (1924 World Series Game 3) and Chicago Cubs' Travis Wood (2016 NL Division Series Game 2) as the only relievers in MLB history to hit a homer in the postseason.
- October 13 :
  - Justin Verlander outpitched Chris Sale to help the Houston Astros beat the Boston Red Sox at Fenway Park, 7–2, in Game 1 of the American League Championship Series. Verlander allowed two runs on two hits and four walks, while striking six in six innings of work. Boston reliever Joe Kelly gave up one run in 1 2/3 innings and was charged with the loss. Sale lasted only four innings while he struggled with his control, loading the bases in the second on two walks and a hit-by-pitch, before delivering a two-out, two-run single to George Springer which to put the Astros ahead. Besides, Verlander earned his 13th career postseason victory. He is surpassed only by Andy Pettitte (19), John Smoltz (15) and Tom Glavine (14).
  - Justin Turner hit a two-run homer off Jeremy Jeffress in the eighth inning to lift the Los Angeles Dodgers over the host Milwaukee Brewers for a 4–3 victory that evened the NL Championship Series at a game apiece. Seven Dodgers relievers went through the final 5 2/3 innings of the game, allowing only a solo homer by Travis Shaw in the sixth while striking out four and giving up four walks. Brewers starter Wade Miley pitched 5 2/3 strong innings of shutout ball, allowing only two singles with three strikeouts and no walks in a lost effort.
- October 14 – Jackie Bradley Jr. hit a three-run RBI double and Mookie Betts delivered an RBI double and scored two runs, as the Boston Red Sox bounced back to defeat Gerrit Cole and the Houston Astros, 7–5, while tying the ALCS at 1–1. The Boston bullpen recorded the final 13 outs in relief of starter David Price. Matt Barnes earned the win and Craig Kimbrel was credited with the save.
- October 15 :
  - Jhoulys Chacín combined with four relievers on a five-hitter to shutout the Los Angeles Dodgers in Game 3 of the NL Championship Series, 4–0, as the Milwaukee Brewers took a 2–1 advantage in the best-of-seven set. Orlando Arcia belted a two-run homer in the seventh inning, collecting his third postseason home run as well as his second in two games. Chacín scattered three hits over 5 1/3 innings, while striking out six and walking two. The 14 strikeouts by Brewers pitchers in this game set a franchise postseason record, topping the old mark of 13 in game 1 of this year's NLCS and Game 2 of the 2011 NLDS against the Arizona Diamondbacks.
  - The Atlanta Braves agreed to a two-year contract extension with manager Brian Snitker that includes a club option for the 2021 season. Snitker, who has been in the Atlanta organization in different roles since becoming a minor league player in 1977, became the team's interim manager six weeks into the 2016 season. He then posted a 72–90 record with the Braves in 2017, and led them to a 92–70 record and the National League East title this season, while guiding the club to its first playoff berth since 2013.
- October 16 :
  - The Boston Red Sox posted an 8–2 victory over the Houston Astros at Minute Maid Park to take a 2–1 lead in this best-of-seven series. Steve Pearce drove a towering 456-foot home run to lead off the top of the sixth inning, breaking a 2–2 tie, but Jackie Bradley Jr. laced a grand slam in the eighth, clearing the bases for the second game in a row, while giving him seven RBI in consecutive games for the first time in his career. Boston starter Nathan Eovaldi walked two and struck out four in six innings, while scattering six hits and two runs.
  - Cody Bellinger delivered a walk-off, RBI single with two outs in the bottom of the 13th-inning, lifting the Los Angeles Dodgers to a 2–1 victory over the Milwaukee Brewers, and even the NLCS at two games apiece. It took five hours and 15 minutes when Bellinger laced a full count pitch from Milwaukee reliever Junior Guerra into right field to score Manny Machado. The Dodgers had scored their first run on an RBI-single by Brian Dozier in the first inning. The Brewers then tied it one-all in the fifth on a Domingo Santana's RBI-double.
  - Milwaukee Brewers manager Craig Counsell and Atlanta Braves manager Brian Snitker we're named the Sporting News Co-National League Manager of the Year.
- October 17 :
  - Boston Red Sox left fielder Andrew Benintendi made a sensational diving catch of an Alex Bregman line drive with the bases loaded and two outs in the bottom of the ninth inning, securing an 8–6 victory over the Houston Astros in Game 4 of the AL Championship Series at Minute Maid Park. Jose Altuve hit a potential two-run homer in the first inning, but Boston right fielder Mookie Betts lined up for a leaping grab and was denied the opportunity to make it when a fan who was reaching for the ball knocked his glove closed and out of the way. As a result, umpire Joe West called the play fan interference and ruled Altuve out. In the top of the sixth, Red Sox center fielder Jackie Bradley Jr. hit a two-run home run that gave him nine RBI in the ALCS and Boston a lead that never relinquished. Bradley has connected just three hits in the series, but each of those hits have changed the final outcome of the games. The Red Sox, who twice came from behind, took a 3–1 lead in the best-of-seven series and put them one victory from reaching the World Series.
  - The Los Angeles Dodgers prevailed over the Milwaukee Brewers in Game 5 of the NLCS at Dodger Stadium, 5–2, as the Dodgers took a 3–2 edge in the best-of-seven series. Clayton Kershaw had his best performance of this postseason, limiting the Brewers to a run on three hits and two walks while striking out nine. The Dodgers loose scored their five runs over the fifth, sixth and seventh innings.
- October 18 – The Boston Red Sox beat the defending World Champion Houston Astros 4–1 in Game 5 of the AL Championship Series at Minute Maid Park, as they advanced to the World Series to face the winner of Dodgers-Brewers NLCS match at Fenway Park in Game 1 of the World Series. On just three days of rest, David Price pitched six solid shutout innings, allowing only three hits and walking none while striking out a playoff career-high nine. Price finished his outing by retiring seven straight batters, earning his first postseason victory as a starter. He was 0–9 in 11 career postseason starts, tied with Al Leiter and Tim Hudson for the most consecutive playoff starts without a win. The Red Sox bullpen closed out the last three innings for the victory. Justin Verlander, who carried an MLB 24-inning scoreless streak record in playoff games, surrendered a solo home run to J. D. Martinez in the third inning. Three innings later, Rafael Devers took Verlander long, for a three-run homer to put the Red Sox up 4–0. Marwin González answered with a solo homer in the bottom of the seventh that made it a 4–1 game. Jackie Bradley Jr., who hit a 1.067 OPS, belted two homers and posted two game-winning hits, earned ALCS Most Valuable Player honors. The victory also marked Red Sox manager Alex Cora's 43rd birthday.
- October 19 – The Milwaukee Brewers beat the Los Angeles Dodgers at Miller Park, 7–2, to even the best-of-seven NL Championship Series at three games apiece. Slugging first baseman Jesús Aguilar sparked the Brewers offense while the relief corp silenced the Dodgers bats. David Freese hit a leadoff home run off Wade Miley in the top of the first inning to give Los Angeles an early 1–0 lead. But Milwaukee answered with four runs in the bottom of the inning against Dodgers starter Hyun-Jin Ryu, as Aguilar started a two-out, four-run parade for the Brewers, coming through with a two-RBI double. Overall, Ryu allowed five runs and lasted just three innings. Afterwards, Aguilar also scored two runs, doubled again, and added a late RBI single. Miley allowed two runs on five hits and two walks while striking out four in 4 1/3 innings of work. He was followed by relievers Corey Knebel, Jeremy Jeffress and Corbin Burnes, who combined to pitch 4 2/3 no-hit, no-run innings with five strikeouts and a hit batter. Knebel was credited with the win.
- October 20 – The Los Angeles Dodgers advanced to the World Series after defeating the Milwaukee Brewers 5–1 in Game 7 of the NLCS at Miller Park. Christian Yelich hit a home run off Dodgers starter Walker Buehler in the first inning to give the Brewers an early lead. But Cody Bellinger responded with a two-run homer off Jhoulys Chacín in the second and Yasiel Puig added a three-run homer off Jeremy Jeffress in the sixth to secure the 23rd National League pennant for the Dodgers franchise, tying them with their rival Giants for most among NL clubs. Bellinger, who also delivered a two-out, walk-off, RBI single in the bottom of the 13th-inning of Game 4, was named the NLCS Most Valuable Player. The 2018 World Series is set to open October 23, with the first two games hosted by the Boston Red Sox at Fenway Park.
- October 21 :
  - The Cincinnati Reds hired David Bell as their field manager for the 2019 season. Cincinnati awarded Bell a three-year contract with a club option for a fourth season. The move represents a homecoming for Bell, a Cincinnati native with deep ties to the organization, as his grandfather Gus Bell, father Buddy Bell and brother Mike Bell all played for the Reds. The Bell family is just one of five families to have three generations play in the Major Leagues and the only one to have produced four generations of players.
  - The Los Angeles Angels announced the hiring of Brad Ausmus as their new manager, in replacement of the recently departed Mike Scioscia. Ausmus, who spent the 2018 season working as a special assistant to Angels general manager Billy Eppler, received a three-year contract. Ausmus previously managed the Detroit Tigers from 2014 to 2017, guiding the team to an AL Central Division title in 2014 and a second place in 2016.
- October 23 – The Boston Red Sox beat the Los Angeles Dodgers, 8–4, in World Series opener at Fenway Park. Andrew Benintendi posted four hits and scored three runs, J. D. Martinez drove in two runs in the first inning, and Eduardo Núñez pinch-hit a three-run home run in the bottom of the seventh to seal the victory. An expected pitching duel between Red Sox's Chris Sale and Dodgers' Clayton Kershaw never developed, because both were pulled out before getting an out in the fifth. Reliever Matt Barnes got the win and Kershaw was charged with the loss, as the Red Sox sixman bullpen held the Dodgers to one run on three hits over five innings. Besides, Dave Roberts of the Dodgers and Alex Cora of the Red Sox became the first minority managers to face each other in the World Series. It is also the first time in World Series history that the opposing managers have played for both clubs in the Series.
- October 24 – David Price held the Los Angeles Dodgers to two runs and three hits over six innings, as the Boston Red Sox won Game 2 at Fenway Park, 4–2, and took a 2–0 lead in the World Series prior to heading to Dodger Stadium for the next game. For the second consecutive game, J. D. Martinez drove in the go-ahead run with a two-run single in the fifth inning that provided the winning margin. Price earned his second postseason victory in a row, giving five strikeouts along with two walks, while retiring the last seven batters he faced. Three relievers combined for three perfect innings and three strikeouts, with Craig Kimbrel closing out the game for his sixth save this postseason. Overall, Price and the bullpen retired the final 16 batters in a row. Hyun-Jin Ryu, who was charged with the loss, allowed four runs on six hits and one walk while striking out five in 4 2/3 innings.
- October 25 :
  - The Minnesota Twins hired Rocco Baldelli as their new manager. Baldelli, who has no managerial experience, spent the last four years on the staff of Tampa Bay Rays manager Kevin Cash, the first three as first base coach. His role for 2018 was a newly created position for him called major league field coordinator, helping Cash and bench coach Charlie Montoyo with in-game strategy, working with the outfielders and focusing on the continued development of the team's young players. An outfielder in his playing days with the Rays, the 37-year-old Baldelli became the youngest manager in the Major Leagues.
  - The Toronto Blue Jays announced the hiring of Tampa Bay Rays bench coach Charlie Montoyo as their new manager, becoming the second member of the Rays' staff to be hired the same day, as the Minnesota Twins previously named Rocco Baldelli as their new skipper for the upcoming season. Born in Puerto Rico, Montoyo had a 10-year playing career as an infielder in the minors before joining the Montreal Expos in 1993. Afterwards, he became a longtime fixture for the Rays on the player development department while managing and coaching in the minors. Montoyo received a three-year contract with a club option for a fourth season.
- October 26 – Max Muncy hit a lead-off, walk-off home run against Nathan Eovaldi in the bottom of the 18th inning, to give the Los Angeles Dodgers a 3–2 victory over the Boston Red Sox in Game 3 of the World Series at Dodger Stadium. The game lasted seven hours and 20 minutes, lasting longer than the entirety of the 1939 World Series, in which the New York Yankees swept the Cincinnati Reds in four games that took a combined seven hours and five minutes to play. The victory cut Los Angeles deficit down to 2–1 in a best-of-seven set. Dodgers rookie Walker Buehler pitched seven scoreless innings, but Los Angeles can only score one run on a solo homer by Joc Pederson off Rick Porcello in the third inning, while Jackie Bradley Jr. tied the score to 1–1 with a homer in the eighth off closer Kenley Jansen. The game featured a wild 13th inning when both teams scored on errors and the score remained at 2–2 until Muncy ended the game five innings later. Game 4 of the 2005 NLDS between the Houston Astros and Atlanta Braves and Game 2 of the 2014 NLDS between the San Francisco Giants and Washington Nationals are the only other postseason games to go 18 innings, but Game 3 was longer than both of those games in terms of total time. The 18 combined pitchers and 46 position players used by the two teams were the most in MLB history for a postseason game.
  - October 27 – The Boston Red Sox rallied from a four-run deficit and scored nine runs in the final three innings, to defeat the Los Angeles Dodgers, 9–6, in Game 4 of the World Series at Dodger Stadium and take a 3–1 lead in the best-of-seven set. Mitch Moreland sparked the rally with a three-run home run off reliever Ryan Madson in the seventh inning. Afterwards, Steve Pearce connected off All-Star closer Kenley Jansen for the tying homer in the eighth, and cleared the bases one inning later with a double off Kenta Maeda. In between, Rafael Devers hit an RBI single off Dylan Floro, tying the score at 4–4 before Pierce's decisive double. Xander Bogaerts tacked on an insurance RBI single that scored Pierce to make it 9–4. Both teams were in a scoreless tie, as Rich Hill and Eduardo Rodríguez held each offense in check for the first five innings. The Dodgers chased Rodríguez in the sixth, scoring a run on a fielder's choice and throwing error, before a homer by Yasiel Puig with runners on the corners and two outs put Los Angeles ahead 4–0. Hill was removed in the seventh, after pitching 6 1/3 solid innings of one-hit, one run ball. Joe Kelly earned the win, as he delivered two scoreless innings of relief in which he gave up three hits with three strikeouts. His best moment came in the eight inning, when he fanned Yasmani Grandal with runners on the corners and two outs to preserve a 4–4 tie. Floro charged with the loss. In the bottom of the ninth, Enrique Hernández belted a two-run homer off Boston closer Craig Kimbrel. Previously, the Dodgers were 54–0 when leading by four runs at any point this season, including the playoffs.
  - Prior to the start of Game 4 a moment of silence is observed for the 11 victims of the Tree of Life synagogue shooting in Pittsburgh that had occurred earlier that day.
- October 28 – Led by Steve Pearce and David Price, the Boston Red Sox ended the World Series in five games with a 5–1 victory over the Los Angeles Dodgers at Dodger Stadium. Winners of a franchise-record 108 games during the season, the Red Sox buried the AL East Division across six months and claimed 11 more victories in the playoffs, knocking off the 100-win New York Yankees in the ALDS, the defending World Series champion Houston Astros in the ALCS, and the two-time NL champion Dodgers in the Fall Classic, while losing just one game in each round. Pearce hit a two-run home run off Clayton Kershaw in the top of the first inning, and the Red Sox took a lead they would never give back. Solo homers by Mookie Betts in the sixth inning and J. D. Martinez in the seventh quieted the Dodger Stadium crowd, while Pearce struck again with a solo shot off Pedro Báez to make it 5–1 in the eighth. Those homers came just a day after Pearce crushed a tying home run in the eighth inning of Game 4, followed by a three-run double that broke the game open in the ninth. Price limited the Dodgers to a solo homer by David Freese on his first pitch and otherwise shut them down over seven-plus innings, allowing just two more hits, striking out five and walking two, while retiring 14 in a row before giving a leadoff walk in the eighth inning. Price was followed by Joe Kelly, who struck out three straight pinch hitters, and Chris Sale, who was originally scheduled to start an eventual Game 5. But Sale finished off the Dodgers in style, striking out the side in the ninth and Manny Machado swinging to end it. Pierce earned World Series MVP honors by collecting four hits— three homers and a double in 12 at bats – along with eight RBI and five runs scored. Boston manager Alex Cora became the first Puerto Rican to lead a team to the World Series, as well as the second Latino manager to do it in the Series. The Venezuelan Ozzie Guillén became the first when he led the Chicago White Sox to the title in 2005. With their victory in the World Series, the Red Sox secured their ninth championship title, tying the Philadelphia/Oakland Athletics franchise for the third most in MLB history behind the New York Yankees (27) and St. Louis Cardinals (11). But the Red Sox have come on strong in recent years, winning four titles in a span of 15 seasons from 2004 through 2018. As a result, they are the first MLB club to win four World Series titles in the 21st century.
- October 29 :
  - The Oakland Athletics, who pulled off one of the most surprising run to the playoffs this season, rewarded executive vice president Billy Beane, general manager David Forst and field manager Bob Melvin with long-term extensions, the club announced in a statement. Despite season-ending injuries to six of their starting pitchers, the Athletics finished with a 97–65 season for the fourth-best record in the American League and a postseason berth, following three losing seasons in which the team did not play well or make satisfactory progress. The Athletics lost to the New York Yankees in the AL Wild Card Game.
  - New York Mets majority owner Fred Wilpon announced that the team agreed to terms with former sports agent Brodie Van Wagenen as its new front office head. Some prominent Mets players — including Jacob deGrom, Noah Syndergaard, Yoenis Céspedes, Todd Frazier and Jason Vargas — were represented by Van Wagenen, making him a familiar figure to the organization over the last several years. This is not the first time that an agent has joined a front office, as Dave Stewart and Joe Garagiola Jr. are two recent examples of former player agents who became general managers. Both did it with the Arizona Diamondbacks.

=== November ===
- November 2 :
  - Clayton Kershaw and the Los Angeles Dodgers agreed on a three-year extension that will keep the three-time Cy Young Award and Triple Crown winner from venturing into the free-agent market. The deal will pay the 30-year-old left-hander $93 million, including incentives based on workload and performance, while receiving $4 million annually in bonuses based on starts, in four $1 million increments, as well as other incentives. The extension replaced the two years and $65 million remaining on the seven-year, $215 million extension that Kershaw signed in January 2014.
  - The Chicago Cubs picked up the option on left-handed pitcher Cole Hamels' contract for the 2019 season. Hamels will make $20 million next season on the team option, as he will join starters Jon Lester, Kyle Hendricks, José Quintana and Yu Darvish, giving the Cubs a very solid pitching rotation in their bid to reclaim the National League Central title. The Cubs also traded left-hander Drew Smyly and a player to be named later to the Texas Rangers in exchange for a PTBNL. The day before, the Cubs exercised their $6.25 million option for Pedro Strop and fellow reliever Brandon Kintzler picked up his $5 million player option.
- November 3 :
  - The Texas Rangers officially announced the hiring of Chris Woodward as their manager for the 2019 season. Woodward signed a three-year deal with a club option for 2022 to become the 19th full-time manager in club history. Woodward, 42, built a 12-year MLB career after being taken in the 54th round of the 1994 draft, playing as a utility infielder with the Blue Jays, Mets, Braves, Mariners and Red Sox between 1999 and 2011. Afterwards, he spent two years on the Mariners' coaching staff and the past three seasons as the Dodgers' third-base coach under manager Dave Roberts. His only managerial experience has been with the New Zealand national baseball team during the 2017 World Baseball Classic qualification tournament in 2016 but did not advance to the tournament.
  - The Fukuoka SoftBank Hawks defeat the Hiroshima Carp to win the 2018 Japan Series, 4–1–1. Takuya Kai, who set a Japan Series record with six consecutive caught stealings, won the Japan Series Most Valuable Player Award.
- November 15 :
  - The Major League Baseball clubs voted on to extend the contract of Commissioner Rob Manfred through the 2024 regular season. The announcement was made at the conclusion of the Owners Meetings in Atlanta.
  - The Japan team beat the MLB All-Stars selection in the final of their six-game exhibition series at Nagoya Dome. Japan posted a 5–1 record against an MLB squad featuring National League Rookie of the Year Ronald Acuña Jr., fellow nominee Juan Soto and veteran catcher and nine-time Gold Glove winner Yadier Molina. Japan was using the series to gauge the progress of its young players as it prepares for the baseball tournament at the 2020 Tokyo Olympics.
- November 16 – Miami Marlins CEO Derek Jeter unveiled a new logo, team colors and uniform for the 2019 MLB season. The new design replaced the one used after the club moved to Marlins Park in 2012, and switched from the Florida Marlins to the Miami Marlins.
- November 19 – The New York Yankees acquire left-handed pitcher James Paxton from the Seattle Mariners in exchange for pitchers Justus Sheffield and Erik Swanson and outfielder Don Thompson-Williams.

=== December ===
- December 3 :
  - The New York Mets and the Seattle Mariners agreed to a seven blockbuster deal that will bring eight-time All-Star second baseman Robinson Canó and closer Edwin Díaz to New York. The Mariners will receive veteran outfielder Jay Bruce, relievers Anthony Swarzak and Gerson Bautista and top prospects Jarred Kelenic and Justin Dunn. In addition, the Mets will receive $20 million from Seattle to help offset the remaining cost of Canó's contract.
  - The Los Angeles Dodgers announced that they reached an agreement with manager Dave Roberts on a contract extension that runs through the 2022 season. Los Angeles had previously exercised his option for the 2019 season, but Roberts will now be under contract for an additional three guaranteed season.
- December 5 – The St. Louis Cardinals traded first baseman Paul Goldschmidt to the Arizona Diamondbacks in exchange for pitcher Luke Weaver, catcher Carson Kelly, minor league infielder Andy Young and a Competitive Balance Round B selection in the 2019 MLB Draft.
- December 7 – Former Venezuelan MLB infielders Luis Valbuena and José Castillo were killed in a car accident in Yaracuy, Venezuela. Valbuena, 33, and Castillo, 37, were playing in Venezuelan winter ball and were teammates on the Cardenales de Lara club. Former Arizona Diamondbacks infielder Carlos Rivero, who survived the accident, was in the car when it collided with a rock that rolled on to the road. The driver of the car was unharmed. Valbuena spent 11 seasons in the majors, beginning his career in 2008 with the Seattle Mariners and then moved onto the Chicago Cubs and Houston Astros before finishing with the Los Angeles Angels in 2018. Castillo played from 2004 through 2008 for the Pittsburgh Pirates, San Francisco Giants and Houston Astros. The Cardenales team said their vehicle overturned as they were heading to the city of Barquisimeto after a game in the capital, Caracas.
- December 9 – Chicago White Sox slugger Harold Baines and Chicago Cubs closer Lee Smith, each of whom were snubbed by the BBWAA, were elected into the Baseball Hall of Fame by the Today's Game Era Committee. Smith was a unanimous choice for the 16-member panel, while Baines received 12 votes, which was the 75% threshold needed. Former outfielder and manager Lou Piniella fell just short with 11 votes. Besides, Albert Belle, Joe Carter, Will Clark, Orel Hershiser, Davey Johnson, Charlie Manuel and George Steinbrenner all received fewer than five votes.
- December 12 :
  - In a switch of pitchers named Tanner-for-Tanner-trade, the Washington Nationals sent veteran Tanner Roark to the Cincinnati Reds in exchange for prospect Tanner Rainey.
  - Later that day, free agent pitcher Charlie Morton signed a two-year, $30 million deal with the Tampa Bay Rays. Although Morton only pitched two seasons for the Houston Astros, he leaves a lasting legacy on the organization, as he will always be remembered as the man who shutout the Los Angeles Dodgers for the final four innings of Game 7 of the 2017 World Series in a 5–1 victory, winning the first World Series championship in franchise history. He also holds the distinction of being the first pitcher to win two Game 7 decisions in the same postseason.
- December 14 – The Baltimore Orioles hired Brandon Hyde to be their new manager. Previously, Hyde served as first base coach and bench coach for the Chicago Cubs and also has managed and coached the Florida Marlins.
- December 19 – Major League Baseball and the MLB Players Association reached a historic agreement with the Cuban Baseball Federation that will allow players from the island to be scouted and signed without having to defect, an effort to eliminate the dangerous trafficking that had gone on for decades. The agreement creates a situation that is akin to that which prevailed before the Cuban Revolution in 1959, while paves the way for a cooperative, stable and non-politicized relationship between the two federations.
- December 21 :
  - In a blockbuster transaction, the Cincinnati Reds acquired Los Angeles Dodgers veterans Matt Kemp, Yasiel Puig and Alex Wood along with utility Kyle Farmer and $7MM. Meanwhile, the Dodgers received Homer Bailey accompanied by rookies Josiah Gray and Jeter Downs. Financial factors obviously weigh heavily here, as Kemp is earning $21.5MM in the final year of his contract, while Bailey is earning $23MM in addition to a $5MM buyout on his 2020 mutual option.
  - In another big transaction, the Oakland Athletics, Texas Rangers, and Tampa Bay Rays came to an agreement on a three-team trade that will send infielder Jurickson Profar from Texas to Oakland. Relief pitcher Emilio Pagan is headed from Oakland to the Rays in the swap, as is Oakland's Competitive Balance Round A selection in the 2019 draft, while Tampa Bay obtains a supplemental 1st round pick in the draft. The Rangers will send minor league pitcher Rollie Lacy to the Rays, as well. In exchange for Profar and Lacy, Texas will receive minor league infielder Eli White from Oakland. Additionally, the Rays will send minor league pitchers Brock Burke, Kyle Bird and Yoel Espinal to the Rangers. Texas will also receive international bonus allotments in the trade.

== Deaths ==
=== January ===
- January 3 – Rob Picciolo, 64, versatile middle infielder for three teams in nine seasons from 1977 to 1985, who later became a longtime coach in the San Diego Padres system, working for them at both the Major and Minor league levels between 1985 and 2005.
- January 4 – Senichi Hoshino, 70, Japanese manager who led the 2003 Hanshin Tigers to their first Central League pennant in 18 years, and also guided the 2013 Tohoku Rakuten Golden Eagles to a Pacific League pennant and the Japan Series championship title.
- January 7 – Dick Young, 89, second baseman for the Philadelphia Phillies from 1951 to 1952.
- January 8 – Bob Bailey, 75, third baseman who played for five teams in a span of 17 seasons from 1962 through 1978, and earned a World Championship ring with the 1976 Cincinnati Reds.
- January 12 – Rudy Árias, 86, Cuban pitcher for the Chicago White Sox in their 1959 season.
- January 12 – Keith Jackson, 89, legendary sports broadcaster best known for his long career with ABC Sports between 1966 and 2006, which included three World Series, three All-Star games, and several playoff matchups.
- January 13 – Doug Harvey, 87, Hall of Fame umpire who officiated at five World Series, nine National League Championship Series and six All-Star Games, while serving as a crew chief during 18 years.
- January 15 – Bob Barton, 76, catcher who spent five seasons with the San Francisco Giants from 1965 to 1968, and also played five more for the San Diego Padres and Cincinnati Reds between 1970 and 1974.
- January 19 – Moose Stubing, 79, pinch hitter who appeared in five games for the 1967 California Angels; later the Angels' third-base coach from 1985 to 1990, a scout and minor-league manager.
- January 20 – Bill Johnson, 57, relief pitcher who posted a 1–0 record over 14 games for the Chicago Cubs from 1983 to 1984.
- January 24 – Marcos Carvajal, 33, Venezuelan relief pitcher who played with the Colorado Rockies in 2005 and the Florida Marlins in 2007.
- January 24 – Julio Navarro, 84, Puerto Rican relief pitcher for the Los Angeles Angels, Detroit Tigers, and Atlanta Braves in a span of six seasons between 1962 and 1970.
- January 25 – Glen Clark, 76, utility man who made four pinch-hitting appearances for the Atlanta Braves in its 1967 season.
- January 30 – Kevin Towers, 56, former general manager for the San Diego Padres from 1995 to 2009 and the Arizona Diamondbacks from 2010 to 2014, who led the Padres won its division in two of his first three seasons at the helm, while advancing to the World Series in 1998.
- January 31 – Oscar Gamble, 68, slugging outfielder who played for the Chicago Cubs, Philadelphia Phillies, Cleveland Indians, New York Yankees, Chicago White Sox, San Diego Padres and Texas Rangers in a span of 17 seasons from 1969 to 1985, including stints with the 1976 and 1981 American League Champion Yankees.

=== February ===
- February 3 – Roy Dietzel, 87, backup infielder who appeared in nine games for the 1954 Washington Senators.
- February 4 – Don Choate, 79, pitcher for the 1960 San Francisco Giants.
- February 4 – Laurin Pepper, 88, pitcher who played from 1954 through 1957 with the Pittsburgh Pirates, previously an All-American halfback at Mississippi Southern, where he also pitched the first no-hitter in school history and two overall.
- February 7 – Ralph Lumenti, 81, spot starter for the Washington Senators in part of three seasons from 1957 to 1959.
- February 9 – Wally Moon, 87, slugging outfielder named Rookie of the Year in the National League in 1954 after batting .304 for the St. Louis Cardinals, who later became a celebrated figure in the early history of the Los Angeles Dodgers, whose monstrous home runs over the short left-field screen at the legendary Memorial Coliseum helped take an aging team to a 1959 World Series title, while earning two more series rings in 1963 and 1965, two All-Star berths in 1957 and 1959, as well as a National League Gold Glove in 1960.
- February 12 – Rudy Regalado, 87, third baseman for the Cleveland Indians in part of three seasons from 1954 to 1956, including the 1954 American League champion Indians team who won a then league-record 111 games.
- February 13 – Tito Francona, 84, All-Star outfielder and a 15-year MLB veteran with eight teams, mainly for the Cleveland Indians between 1956 and 1970, whose son, Terry, is the Indians manager.
- February 14 – Lois Barker, 94, All-American Girls Professional Baseball League player.
- February 15 – Tom Brewer, 86, All-Star pitcher who won 19 games in 1956 and had double-digit wins in seven of his eight seasons, all with the Boston Red Sox, whose promising career was derailed by diverse arm and shoulder injuries at the age of 29.
- February 22 – Jack Hamilton, 79, pitcher for six teams in a span of eight seasons from 1962 to 1969, who was best known for accidentally beaning Boston Red Sox outfielder Tony Conigliaro during the 1967 season, causing him a severe eye injury and derailing his career.

=== March ===
- March 2 – Sammy Stewart, 63, Baltimore Orioles pitcher who set a major league record by striking out seven straight batters in his 1978 debut against the Chicago White Sox, had the best earned run average in the American League in 1981 (2.32), and would later help his team win two pennant titles and the World Series championship in 1983, while collecting a perfect 0.00 ERA with one save and eight strikeouts in 12.0 innings of relief over six postseason games.
- March 3 – Curt Raydon, 84, promising pitcher who posted an 8–4 record with a 3.62 ERA and a four-hit shutout as a rookie for the Pittsburgh Pirates in 1958, but would never pitch again in the majors after developing a cyst on the index finger of his pitching hand and then a sore arm the next two years.
- March 5 – Bob Engel, 84, umpire who officiated in the National League from 1965 through 1990, whose 26-year career included three World Series, six NL Championship Series and four All-Star Games, as well as serving as president of the MLB umpires union.
- March 6 – Steve Stroughter, 66, outfielder and designated hitter who played for the Seattle Mariners during the 1982 season.
- March 13 – Gloria Cordes, 86, All-American Girls Professional Baseball League pitcher from 1950 to 1954.
- March 15 – Ed Charles, 84, third baseman who was a key component on the Miracle Mets team that unexpectedly defeated the highly favored Baltimore Orioles in the 1969 World Series.
- March 15 – Augie Garrido, 79, college baseball coach who coached at Cal State Fullerton and The University of Texas, while leading Texas to two national titles and becoming college baseball's winningest coach with 1,975 wins before retiring in 2016.
- March 16 – Jane Moffet, 87, utility player who played from 1949 to 1952 in the All American Girls Professional Baseball League.
- March 18 – Jerry Schoonmaker, 84, outfielder who played for the Washington Senators from 1955 through 1957 before sustaining an eye injury that ended his playing career.
- March 19 – Dick LeMay, 79, pitcher for the New York Giants and Chicago Cubs during three seasons from 1961 to 1963.
- March 21 – Larry Miller, 80, pitcher who played for the Los Angeles Dodgers and New York Mets from 1964 to 1966.
- March 22 – Wayne Huizenga, 80, former owner of the MLB Florida Marlins, NFL Miami Dolphins and NHL Florida Panthers for several years, while leading the Marlins to the 1997 World Series championship.
- March 24 – Carl Scheib, 91, pitcher for the Philadelphia Athletics in all or parts of 11 seasons who, in 1943 at age 16, became the youngest player to appear in an American League game.
- March 27 – Jerry Moses, 71, All-Star catcher whose career lasted from 1965 to 1975 while playing for seven clubs, who in his major league debut at age 18 became the youngest Boston Red Sox player to hit a pinch-hit home run, and in 1967 was a member of the Impossible Dream Red Sox team during its first winning season since 1958, also reaching the World Series for the first time since 1946.
- March 29 – Ed Samcoff, 93, second baseman for the 1951 Philadelphia Athletics.
- March 29 – Rusty Staub, 73, six-time All-Star right fielder, designated hitter and first baseman nicknamed "Le Grande Orange", who played 23 major league seasons for the Houston Colt .45s/Astros, Montreal Expos, New York Mets, Detroit Tigers and Texas Rangers from 1963 to 1985, while leading the Mets to the 1973 World Series, being also the first player to have his uniform number retired by the Expos and the only player in MLB history to collect 500 or more hits with four different teams.

=== April ===
- April 8 – Joe McConnell, 79, sports announcer who broadcast games for the 1978–1979 Minnesota Twins and 1980–1984 Chicago White Sox.
- April 12 – Len Okrie, 94, catcher who played for the Boston Red Sox and Washington Senators in all or parts of five seasons from 1948 to 1952; later, the MLB bullpen coach of the Red Sox and Detroit Tigers for five seasons between 1961 and 1970.
- April 16 – Ken Hottman, 69, Minor League Baseball slugger whose Major League career as an outfielder was limited to six games and 17 plate appearances with the Chicago White Sox in 1971.
- April 18 – John Hope, 47, pitcher who played from 1993 through 1996 for the Pittsburgh Pirates.
- April 19 – John Duffie, 72, starting pitcher in two games for the Los Angeles Dodgers during the 1967 season.
- April 20 – George Alusik, 83, outfielder and first baseman who played with the Detroit Tigers and the Kansas City Athletics in a span of five seasons from 1958 to 1964.
- April 21 – Ron Hayter, 81, Canadian Baseball Hall of Fame inductee, an avid sportsman as a player, coach, manager, executive and organizer of Canadian and international baseball for close to 50 years, from developing the first Canadian rulebook to organizing the inaugural national championships, and also by representing Canada in the International Baseball Federation (IBAF) for 18 years.
- April 22 – Dave Nelson, 73, All-Star second baseman who played from 1968 through 1977 for the Cleveland Indians, Washington Senators, Texas Rangers and Kansas City Royals, and later coached in the major leagues and also served as a broadcaster for the Chicago Cubs, Cleveland Indians, Kansas City Royals and Milwaukee Brewers between 1979 and 1999.
- April 23 – Sachio Kinugasa, 71, Hall of Fame NPB third baseman for the Hiroshima Carp/Hiroshima Toyo Carp from 1965 to 1987.
- April 24 – Lee Howard, 94, left-handed pitcher who worked in five games for the 1946 and 1947 Pittsburgh Pirates.
- April 24 – Marv Rackley, 96, outfielder for three teams from 1947 to 1950, who at the time of his death was one of the last living Brooklyn Dodgers players.
- April 30 – Frank Ernaga, 87, outfielder for the Chicago Cubs in part of two seasons from 1957 to 1958, who is best remembered for having hit one home run against Milwaukee Braves pitcher Warren Spahn in his first Major League at-bat.

=== May ===
- May 5 – Roy Wright, 84, pitcher who played one Major League Baseball season for the Philadelphia Phillies in 1956 and then three seasons in the minors from 1957 to 1959 before retiring in 1960.
- May 8 – Al Stanek, 74, pitcher for the 1963 San Francisco Giants.
- May 9 – Tom Fletcher, 75, pitcher who appeared in just one game with the Detroit Tigers in its 1962 season.
- May 14 – Frank Quilici, 79, second baseman who played five seasons for the Minnesota Twins from 1965 to 1970 hitting five homers and driving in 53 runs before ending his playing career in 1971, who later served as the manager of the Twins from 1972 to 1975 and as a broadcaster for them from 1976 to 1982.
- May 22 – Dave Garcia, 97, who spent 65 years in professional baseball in different areas of the game, including stints as a major league manager with the Cleveland Indians from 1979 to 1982 and the California Angels for parts of the 1977 and 1978 seasons, posting a 310–311 record, while compiling an 890–785 managerial mark in the minors and leading teams to three championships.
- May 28 – Chuck Stevens, 99, first baseman for the St. Louis Browns in a span of three seasons between 1941 and 1948, who was recognized as the oldest living major league ballplayer at the time of his death.
- May 29 – Ray Barker, 82, first baseman who played for the Baltimore Orioles, Cleveland Indians and New York Yankees in part of four seasons spanning 1960–1967.

=== June ===
- June 1 – Fred Van Dusen, 80, pinch hitter who appeared in one game for the Philadelphia Phillies in the 1955 season.
- June 2 – Mary Baumgartner, 87, catcher who played from 1949 through 1954 in the All-American Girls Professional Baseball League, where she shined as an All-Star and member of two championship clubs, as well as for her stellar glove work behind the plate.
- June 2 – Bruce Kison, 68, pitcher who was part of two Pittsburgh Pirates World Series-winning teams, while defeating the highly favored Baltimore Orioles in 1971 and 1979, being best remembered for his star performance as a rookie in game 4 of the 1971 World Series, the first night game in series history.
- June 4 – Steve Kline, 70, pitcher who played for the New York Yankees, Cleveland Indians and Atlanta Braves in all or part of seven seasons spanning 1970–1977.
- June 5 – Chuck Taylor, 76, pitcher who played from 1969 through 1976 with the St. Louis Cardinals, New York Mets, Milwaukee Brewers and Montreal Expos.
- June 6 – Larry Owen, 63, backup catcher who played for the Atlanta Braves and Kansas City Royals in five seasons between 1981 and 1988.
- June 6 – Red Schoendienst, 95, Hall of Fame second baseman and a 10-time All-Star with the St. Louis Cardinals, New York Giants and Milwaukee Braves while winning World Series championships as a player in 1946 with the Cardinals and 1957 with the Braves, before managing the Cardinals to two National League pennants and a World Series championship in 1967.
- June 14 – Ed Roebuck, 86, relief pitcher who hurled for the only Brooklyn Dodgers club to win a World Series championship and the first Dodgers team based in Los Angeles.
- June 17 – Dutch Rennert, 88, National League umpire during 20 seasons from 1973 to 1992, who was known for his animated, booming strike calls, while working jn 2,693 regular-season games, six NLCS, three World Series and two All-Star Games.
- June 18 – Billy Connors, 76, player, coach and executive who spent more than forty years in baseball, as well as a longtime fixture for the New York Yankees, joining the club as their pitching coach in three stints between 1989 and 2000, and also working as vice president of player personnel from 1996 to 2012.
- June 22 – Tony Bartirome, 86, first baseman for the Pittsburgh Pirates in its 1952 season, who also served as a field trainer for the Pirates from 1967 to 1985.
- June 28 – Mike Kilkenny, 73, Canadian pitcher who played from 1969 through 1973 with the Detroit Tigers. Oakland Athletics, San Diego Padres and Cleveland Indians, best known for giving up Frank Robinson's 500th home run in 1971, and a year later for become one of the few players in MLB history to play for four teams during the same season.

=== July ===
- July 1 – Harvey Gentry, 92, pinch hitter who appeared in five games with the New York Giants when the team captured its 1954 World Championship, also an U.S. Navy veteran honored by his service during World War II.
- July 11 – Sammy Esposito, 86, infielder for the Chicago White Sox in a span of 10 seasons from 1952 to 1963, including the 1959 American League champion White Sox team, who later coached at North Carolina State University, winning 513 games with the NC State Wolfpack team while leading them to four ACC baseball tournament titles and a third-place finish in the 1968 College World Series.
- July 24 – Tony Cloninger, 77, fireball pitcher who went on to have a 12-year major league career with four teams from 1961 to 1972, also one of few Braves members to play in the final year of the team in Milwaukee in 1965 and in 1966 in the Braves first season in Atlanta, earning notoriety as the first player in National League history, and the only pitcher to date, to hit two grand slams in the same game, while collecting nine runs batted in, which as of 2018, stands as the Braves' franchise record for the most RBI in a game.
- July 24 – Vaughn Eshelman, 49, middle-relief pitcher who played from 1995 through 1997 for the Boston Red Sox.
- July 29 – Johnny Lewis, 78, outfielder for the St. Louis Cardinals and New York Mets in four seasons spanning 1964–1967, who is probably best known for breaking up a Jim Maloney no-hitter in the 11th inning with a game-winning home run for the Mets over the Cincinnati Reds.
- July 31 – Daryl Robertson, 82, backup infielder for the 1962 Chicago Cubs.

=== August ===
- August 1 – Myron White, 61, corner outfielder for the 1978 Los Angeles Dodgers.
- August 9 – John Kennedy, 77, third baseman for six clubs in twelve seasons from 1965 through 1974, who hit a home run in his first major league at bat as a member of the Washington Senators, and would be part of history while playing for the Los Angeles Dodgers during the Sandy Koufax's perfect game in 1965, and later for the 1965 World Champion Dodgers.
- August 18 – Ozzie Van Brabant, 91, Canadian pitcher for the Philadelphia/Kansas City Athletics from 1954 to 1955, who during the 1955 season, along with countryman Eric Mackenzie, formed the only all-Canadian pitcher-catcher battery to ever play in Major League Baseball history.
- August 19 – Joe Landrum, 89, pitcher who played for the Brooklyn Dodgers in the 1950 and 1952 seasons.
- August 20 – Doc Edwards, 81, backup catcher for the Cleveland Indians, Kansas City Athletics, New York Yankees and Philadelphia Phillies over parts of five seasons spanning 1962–1970, who later coached for Cleveland, Philadelphia and the New York Mets, and went on to manage the Indians for three seasons from 1987 to 1989.
- August 21 – Dean Stone, 88, pitcher for six teams during eleven seasons between 1953 and 1964, including seven with the Washington Senators from 1951 to 1957. He was the winning pitcher of the 1954 MLB All-Star Game without retiring a single batter.

=== September ===
- September 9 – Paul Stuffel, 91, pitcher who played for the Philadelphia Phillies over a three-season span from 1950 to 1953.
- September 12 – Billy O'Dell, 85, two-time All-Star pitcher and one of a few players to have played for the Milwaukee/Atlanta Braves franchise, being also a member of the 1962 San Francisco Giants team that reached the World Series.
- September 14 – Phil Clark, 86, pitcher who played with the St. Louis Cardinals in the 1958 and 1959 seasons.
- September 21 – Lee Stange, 81, who pitched for four different teams during ten seasons from 1961 through 1970, including the 1967 Boston Red Sox Impossible Dream Team, which won the AL pennant race in the very last game, earning the team's first winning season since 1958, while reaching the World Series for the first time since 1946.

=== October ===
- October 1 – Peter C. Bjarkman, 77, author of more than 40 books on sports history, as well as the leading authority on the history of Cuban baseball throughout the years.
- October 3 – Marty Pattin, 75, All-Star pitcher who played from 1968 through 1980 for the California Angels, Seattle Pilots, Milwaukee Brewers, Boston Red Sox and Kansas City Royals.
- October 9 – José Santiago, 90, Puerto Rican pitcher who played in the Negro leagues for the New York Cubans from 1947 to 1948, before pitching in Major League Baseball with the Cleveland Indians and the Kansas City Athletics in three seasons between 1954 and 1956.
- October 10 – Don Eddy, 71, pitcher who played for the Chicago White Sox in the 1970 and 1971 seasons.
- October 15 – Joe Stanka, 87, pitcher for the 1959 Chicago White Sox and the Nankai Hawks from 1960 to 1965 and the 1966 Taiyo Whales.
- October 16 – Dave Hill, 80, pitcher who appeared in two games for the Kansas City Athletics in 1957.
- October 16 – Wayne Krenchicki, 64, former Cincinnati Reds third baseman and Minor League Baseball manager.
- October 18 – Dick Cole, 92, infielder for the St. Louis Cardinals, Pittsburgh Pirates and Milwaukee Braves for parts of six seasons from 1951 to 1957.
- October 22 – Hank Greenwald, 83, longtime play-by-play broadcaster for the San Francisco Giants both before and after his stint with the New York Yankees.
- October 24 – Benny Valenzuela, 85, Mexican third baseman who played for the 1958 St. Louis Cardinals.
- October 30 – Bill Fischer, 88, who spent 71 years in baseball as a pitcher and pitching coach, including pitching for six clubs in a span of nine seasons from 1956 to 1964; coaching for the Reds (1979–1983), Red Sox (1985–1991) and Devil Rays (2000–2001); coaching and managing in the Braves minor league system (2002–2006); working as the Royals' senior pitching adviser (2007–2010) and pitching coordinator (2011–2018), winning a 2015 World Series ring, and setting an MLB record when pitching for the Kansas City Athletics in 1962, when he threw 84 1/3 consecutive innings pitched without issuing a walk, breaking the mark of 68.0 innings set by Christy Mathewson in 1913, while establishing a pitching record that still stands.
- October 31 – Willie McCovey, 80, Hall of Fame first baseman whose career spanned 22 seasons from 1959 to 1980 and included three teams, most prominently with the San Francisco Giants, being selected to six All-Star Games, while compiling a .270/.374/.515 slash line including 2,211 hits, 521 home runs, 353 doubles, 1,345 walks and 1,555 RBI, earning the NL Rookie of the Year Award in 1959, and the NL Most Valuable Player Award in 1969 and All-Star Game MVP honors, also in 1969.

=== November ===
- November 3 – Jairo Capellán, 19, right-handed pitcher in the Cincinnati Reds minor league system, killed in a car accident in the Dominican Republic that also involved right-handed pitcher Raúl Hernández and outfielder Emilio García.
- November 4 – Katherine Herring, 85, outfielder who played for the Grand Rapids Chicks of the All-American Girls Professional Baseball League.
- November 8 – Ron Negray, 88, pitcher for the Brooklyn Dodgers, Philadelphia Phillies and Los Angeles Dodgers over part of four seasons from 1952 to 1958.
- November 9 – Ken Howell, 57, relief pitcher for the Los Angeles Dodgers and Philadelphia Phillies in a span of six seasons from 1984 to 1990, who later coached in the Dodgers Minor League system from 2003 to 2007 before joining the Dodgers Major League coaching staff between 2008 and 2015.
- November 16 – Nick Testa, 90, catcher who appeared in just one game with the San Francisco Giants in its 1958 season.
- November 30 – George H. W. Bush, 94, 41st President of the United States who was also a first baseman and captain of the Yale Bulldogs baseball team at Yale University in the 1940s and also participated in the first two editions of the College World Series in 1947 and 1948.
- November 30 – Fred Caligiuri, 100, pitcher for the Philadelphia Athletics in part of two seasons from 1941 to 1942, who at the time of his death was the oldest living former major-leaguer.

=== December ===
- December 5 – Bobby Treviño. 73, Mexican left fielder who played briefly for the California Angels in its 1968 season.
- December 6 – José Castillo, 37, Venezuelan infielder who played from 2004 through 2008 for the Pittsburgh Pirates, San Francisco Giants and Houston Astros.
- December 6 – Al Gallagher, 73, nicknamed Dirty Al for his hustle and determination, as well as the first ballplayer born and raised in San Francisco to play for the Giants franchise following their 1958 move west from New York, playing for them as a third baseman from 1970 through 1973 before joining the California Angels in 1973, who later enjoyed a long career as a colorful and quirky manager in Independent leagues, managing in ten different leagues in a span of 36 years from 1976 to 2012, primarily for the legendary Durham Bulls, becoming the inspiration for the eccentric character portrayed by actor Trey Wilson in the successful film Bull Durham.
- December 6 – Luis Valbuena, 33, infielder for the Seattle Mariners, Cleveland Indians, Chicago Cubs, Houston Astros and Los Angeles Angels in a span of eleven seasons from 2008 to 2018.
- December 9 – Bob Giggie, 85, pitcher who made 14 appearances for the Milwaukee Braves and Kansas City Athletics over part of three seasons spanning 1959–1962.
- December 12 – Billy MacLeod, 79, pitcher who played briefly for the Boston Red Sox in its 1962 season.
- December 14 – Joan Steinbrenner, 83, Vice-chairwoman of the New York Yankees and the widow of late Yankees owner George Steinbrenner.
- December 17 – Penny Marshall, 75, TV sitcom star and filmmaker best known for Laverne and Shirley, as well as the first woman to direct a film that grossed more than $100 million, who later made her biggest contribution to sports with A League of Their Own, a charming comedy-drama film that tells a fictionalized account of the real-life All-American Girls Professional Baseball League.
- December 26 – Pete Lovrich, 76, pitcher for the 1963 Kansas City Athletics.
- December 27 – Joe Camacho, 90, a middle infielder in the minors, then the bench coach for the Washington Senators and Texas Rangers franchise over four seasons from 1969 to 1972.
- December 27 – Neale Henderson, 88, Negro league baseball shortstop who played from 1950 to 1951 for the Kansas City Monarchs.
