= Troy Herriage =

American baseball player (1930–2012)

- Pitcher
- Born: December 20, 1930; Tipton, Oklahoma, U.S.
- Died: January 21, 2012 (aged 81); Atlanta, Georgia, U.S.
- Batted: Right Threw: Right

MLB debut
- April 25, 1956, for the Kansas City Athletics

Last MLB appearance
- September 26, 1956, for the Kansas City Athletics

MLB statistics
- Win–loss record: 1–13
- Earned run average: 6.64
- Strikeouts: 59
- Inning pitched: 103
- Stats at Baseball Reference

Teams
- Kansas City Athletics (1956)

William Troy Herriage (December 20, 1930 – January 21, 2012) was an American pitcher in Major League Baseball who played for the Kansas City Athletics during the 1956 season. Nicknamed "Dutch," he was listed at 6 ft 1 in (1.85 m) (1.85 m), 170 lb. (77 kg).

Herriage was born in Tipton, Oklahoma. He grew up in California, attending Oakdale High School in the San Joaquin Valley.

Herriage played in the Philadelphia Phillies and Boston Red Sox minor league systems in 1951–52 before joining military service during Korean War. Following discharge in 1954, he played two years in the minors and was selected in the 1955 Rule 5 draft by the Kansas City Athletics.

Herriage formed part of a 1956 Kansas City pitching rotation that included Wally Burnette, Art Ditmar, Lou Kretlow and Alex Kellner. The Athletics squad finished last in the then eight team American League, with a 52–102 mark, 45 games out of first place. Herriage posted a 1–13 record and a 6.64 earned run average in 31 games (16 starts), allowing 83 runs (76 earned) on 135 hits, while striking out 59 and walking 64 batters in 103 innings of work. In his one MLB victory, on May 22, 1956, he threw a complete game and defeated the Washington Senators, 6–1, allowing only three singles.

After 1956, Herriage returned to the minor leagues for two more years. He went 55–55 with a 3.61 ERA for seven teams in parts of 11 minor league seasons spanning 1951–1958.

Following baseball, Herriage enjoyed a long career as a design engineer and later developed a second career as a bed and breakfast owner. He was a longtime resident of Atlanta, where he died at the age of 81.
