= Sonny Dixon (baseball) =

American baseball player

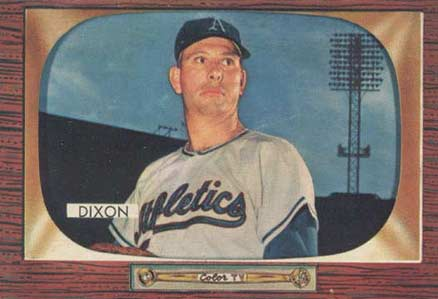
- Pitcher
- Born: November 5, 1924; Charlotte, North Carolina, U.S.
- Died: November 19, 2011 (aged 87); Charlotte, North Carolina, U.S.
- Batted: Switch Threw: Right

MLB debut
- April 20, 1953, for the Washington Senators

Last MLB appearance
- September 29, 1956, for the New York Yankees

MLB statistics
- Win–loss record: 11–18
- Earned run average: 4.17
- Strikeouts: 90
- Stats at Baseball Reference

Teams
- Washington Senators (1953–1954); Philadelphia / Kansas City Athletics (1954–1955); New York Yankees (1956)

John Craig "Sonny" Dixon (November 5, 1924 – November 19, 2011) was an American professional baseball pitcher who played in Major League Baseball for four seasons with the Washington Senators (1953–1954), Philadelphia / Kansas City Athletics (1954–1955) and New York Yankees (1956). A right-hander, the switch-hitting Dixon threw stood 6 feet 2 inches (1.88 m) tall and weighed 205 pounds (93 kg).

Signed by the Senators prior to the 1941 season, Dixon served in the United States Navy in the Pacific Theater of Operations during World War II and missed three years (1943–1945) of his baseball career. He resumed pitching in 1946 and won 19 games for the Class B Charlotte Hornets. But it would take nine minor league seasons, and another 19-win campaign (in 1952 for the Double-A Chattanooga Lookouts), to propel Dixon to the Major Leagues.

He worked in 43 games, with six starts, for Washington during his rookie 1953 season, and lost eight of 13 decisions, although he registered consecutive complete game victories against the Boston Red Sox and the St. Louis Browns on May 30 and June 4. On June 11, 1954, he was traded by Senators to the Chicago White Sox for fellow pitcher Gus Keriazakos, and then dealt the same day with pitcher Al Sima, outfielder Bill Wilson and $20,000 to the Philadelphia Athletics for hurler Morrie Martin and outfielder Ed McGhee. Dixon appeared in 54 games at season, 38 of them for the Athletics.

On May 11, 1955, Dixon and cash were sent by the Athletics, in their first year in Kansas City, to the New York Yankees in exchange for a couple of well-known veteran players: pitcher Johnny Sain and eventual Hall of Famer outfielder Enos Slaughter. He had appeared in only two games for the 1955 A's, and was sent to the Triple-A Denver Bears upon his acquisition by the Yanks. After an effective 1956 season in Triple-A, Dixon received his final big-league trial as a September call-up by the pennant-bound 1956 Yankees, and he was effective in three relief appearances. He then pitched exclusively in the minors through 1961, when he concluded an 18-year pro career.

During his four seasons in the Majors, Sonny Dixon compiled an 11–18 career mark with a 4.17 earned run average, allowing 296 hits and 75 bases on balls in 263 innings pitched; he struck out 90 and recorded nine saves.
