= Blairs, Virginia =

Census-designated place in Virginia, US

Coordinates: 36°40′47″N 79°22′23″W

Blairs is a census-designated place (CDP) in Pittsylvania County, Virginia, United States. The population as of the 2010 Census was 916, a figure which declined to 841 at the 2020 census.

Chatham-Blairs is also the name of a political district in south-central Pittsylvania County.

== Demographics ==
Historical population
Census	Pop.	Note	%±
2010	916		—
2020	841		−8.2%
U.S. Decennial Census; 2010 2020

Blairs was first listed as a census designated place in the 2010 U.S. census.

== Notable person ==
- Wally Burnette, professional baseball player who pitched three seasons in major league baseball
