= Rance Pless =

American baseball player (1925–2017)

- First baseman / Third baseman
- Born: December 6, 1925; Greeneville, Tennessee, U.S.
- Died: November 11, 2017 (aged 91); Greeneville, Tennessee, U.S.
- Batted: Right Threw: Right

MLB debut
- April 21, 1956, for the Kansas City Athletics

Last MLB appearance
- September 30, 1956, for the Kansas City Athletics

MLB statistics
- Batting average: .271
- Home runs: 0
- Runs batted in: 9
- Stats at Baseball Reference

Teams
- Kansas City Athletics (1956)

Rance Pless (December 6, 1925 – November 11, 2017) was an American professional baseball player. A third baseman, first baseman and outfielder over the course of a 14-year professional career, he played part of one season of Major League Baseball with the 1956 Kansas City Athletics. He threw and batted right-handed, stood 6 feet (1.83 m) tall and weighed 195 pounds (88 kg).

Pless was born in Greeneville, Tennessee. His career began in the New York Giants' minor league organization as an outfielder in 1947. In nine seasons in the Giants' farm system, he won two batting championships, in the 1952 Double-A Southern Association (.364) and the 1955 Triple-A American Association (.337). After the latter season, he was acquired by the Kansas City A's, who played him in 48 games as a third baseman, first baseman and pinch hitter during 1956. Pless collected 23 hits in 85 at bats, including three doubles and one triple. Playing 15 games at first base and 5 games at third base, Pless handled 162 total chances without an error for a 1.000 fielding percentage. He also played part of that season for the Triple-A Richmond Virginians. Pless retired from baseball after the 1960 season with a career minor league batting average of .303 in 1,755 games. He died on November 11, 2017.

== Personal life ==
Rance was married to his wife, Lucille Pless, for more than 70 years before his passing. They had one son together.

== Military service ==
During World War II, Rance served in the Navy on the Asiatic Pacific from 1944 to 1946. . He was assigned to a landing craft infantry ship (LCI-696).
