= Jerry Schypinski =

American baseball player (1931–2019)

- Shortstop
- Born: September 16, 1931; Detroit, Michigan, U.S.
- Died: March 25, 2019 (aged 87); Sterling Heights, Michigan, U.S.
- Batted: Left Threw: Right

MLB debut
- August 31, 1955, for the Kansas City Athletics

Last MLB appearance
- September 25, 1955, for the Kansas City Athletics

MLB statistics
- Batting average: .217
- Home runs: 0
- Runs batted in: 5
- Stats at Baseball Reference

Teams
- Kansas City Athletics (1955)

Gerald Albert Schypinski (September 16, 1931 – March 25, 2019) was an American Major League Baseball shortstop.

== Biography ==
Schypinski was born in Detroit, Michigan and played for the Kansas City Athletics in 1955, appearing in 22 games played with 20 starts (two of them as a second baseman) during the waning weeks of the season. He collected 15 hits, including two doubles and batted .217. Schypinski attended the University of Detroit Mercy. He was listed as 5 feet 10 inches (1.78 m) tall and weighed 170 pounds (77 kg), batted left-handed and threw right-handed. He signed with the Athletics while the team was still based in Philadelphia and he spent his entire four-season (1952–53; 1955–56) professional baseball career in the A's organization. He missed part of 1953 and all of 1954 while serving in the U.S. military during the Korean War.

Schypinski was errorless in the field as the A's shortstop. He died on March 25, 2019.
