= Mike Kume =

American baseball player (1926-2012)

- Pitcher
- Born: May 19, 1926; Premier, West Virginia, U.S.
- Died: November 26, 2012 (aged 86); Richmond, Ohio, U.S.
- Batted: Right Threw: Right

MLB debut
- August 26, 1955, for the Kansas City Athletics

Last MLB appearance
- September 25, 1955, for the Kansas City Athletics

MLB statistics
- Win–loss record: 0–2
- Earned run average: 7.99
- Innings: 23 2/3
- Stats at Baseball Reference

Teams
- Kansas City Athletics (1955)

John Michael Kume (May 19, 1926 – November 26, 2012) was an American professional baseball player. He was a right-handed pitcher who debuted with the Kansas City Athletics during the 1955 season.

Kume stood 6 feet 1 inch (1.85 m) tall and weighed 195 pounds (88 kg). He made his Major League debut at age 29 after spending eight seasons in the Athletics' farm system, signing with them in 1948 when they were still based in Philadelphia. As a Major Leaguer, he allowed 35 hits, 15 bases on balls, and 21 earned runs in 23 2/3 innings, striking out seven.

His pro career lasted 12 seasons (and 734 minor league games), all in the Athletics' organization.
