= Carl Duser =

American baseball player (1932–2023)

- Pitcher
- Born: July 22, 1932; Hazleton, Pennsylvania, U.S.
- Died: January 5, 2023 (aged 90); Sayre, Pennsylvania, U.S.
- Batted: Left Threw: Left

MLB debut
- September 15, 1956, for the Kansas City Athletics

Last MLB appearance
- April 23, 1958, for the Kansas City Athletics

MLB statistics
- Win–loss record: 1–1
- Earned run average: 7.88
- Strikeouts: 5
- Stats at Baseball Reference

Teams
- Kansas City Athletics (1956; 1958)

Carl Robert Duser (July 22, 1932 – January 5, 2023) was an American Major League Baseball pitcher. He played for the Kansas City Athletics during the 1956 and 1958 seasons. He attended Weatherly Area High School, in Pennsylvania.

Duser served in the United States Army during the Korean War. He was employed by the Bethlehem Steel as a sales executive for over 27 years until retiring. He was an accomplished professional baseball player including pitching for the Kansas City Athletics from 1956 to 1958, when his career was cut short by an unfortunate automobile accident. He was a Caribbean World Series champion and was inducted into the Baseball Hall of Fame in Pennsylvania. He struck out murder's row which is the top 3 Yankees where he struck out all 3 in a row including Mickey Mantle.

Duser died in Sayre, Pennsylvania, on January 5, 2023, at the age of 90.
