= Eric Mackenzie (baseball) =

Canadian baseball player (born 1932)

- Catcher
- Born: August 29, 1932 (age 93); Glendon, Alberta, Canada
- Batted: Left Threw: Right

MLB debut
- April 23, 1955, for the Kansas City Athletics

Last MLB appearance
- April 23, 1955, for the Kansas City Athletics

MLB statistics
- Batting average: .000
- Home runs: 0
- Runs scored: 0
- Stats at Baseball Reference

Teams
- Kansas City Athletics (1955)

Eric Hugh Mackenzie (born August 29, 1932) is a Canadian retired professional baseball player. A former catcher, he played professional ball for eight seasons, but appeared in only one Major League game and had only one at bat for the Kansas City Athletics in 1955. He batted left-handed, threw right-handed and was listed as 6 feet (1.8 metres) tall and 185 pounds (84 kg) (13 stone, 3 pounds).

Mackenzie's career extended from 1951 to 1958 and included 632 games played, all but 105 of them in the Athletics' organisation. He signed with them when the team was still based in Philadelphia, and made his debut and lone appearance with them during their inaugural season in Kansas City. On April 23, 1955, against the Chicago White Sox at Municipal Stadium, he pinch hit for A's catcher Joe Astroth in the eighth inning against pitcher Harry Dorish and grounded out to second baseman Nellie Fox. Mackenzie stayed in the game and caught the ninth inning. Chicago thrashed Kansas City, 29–6. Mackenzie then split the remainder of the season between the Class A Savannah Athletics and the Class B Lancaster Red Roses.

He currently lives in Sarnia, Ontario, Canada.
