= Don Plarski =

American baseball player (1929-1981)

- Center fielder
- Born: November 9, 1929; Chicago, Illinois, U.S.
- Died: December 29, 1981 (aged 52); St. Louis, Missouri, U.S.
- Batted: Right Threw: Right

MLB debut
- July 20, 1955, for the Kansas City Athletics

Last MLB appearance
- August 2, 1955, for the Kansas City Athletics

MLB statistics
- Games played: 8
- At bats: 11
- Hit(s): 1
- Stats at Baseball Reference

Teams
- Kansas City Athletics (1955)

Donald Joseph Plarski (November 9, 1929 – December 29, 1981) was an American professional baseball player. An outfielder, he appeared in eight games for the Kansas City Athletics of Major League Baseball during the 1955 season. Plarski was born in Chicago. He threw and batted right-handed and was listed as 5 feet 6 inches (1.68 m) tall and 160 pounds (73 kg).

His professional career, interrupted by military service during the Korean War, lasted from 1948–50 and 1953–56, most of it occurring in the lower and mid-minor leagues. His 1955 trial happened at mid-season. He started in three games in center field for the Athletics, including on July 21 at Municipal Stadium, when he collected his only MLB hit (off Frank Sullivan of the Boston Red Sox) and stolen base.

After his playing career, Plarski became a sportswriter and the longtime sports editor of the Alton Evening Telegraph in Alton, Illinois and was a fast-pitch softball umpire. He died at age 52 in St. Louis, Missouri.
