= Joe Astroth =

American baseball player (1922–2013)

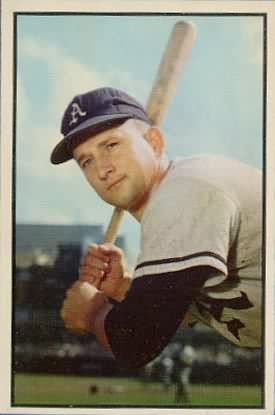
- Catcher
- Born: September 1, 1922; East Alton, Illinois, U.S.
- Died: May 3, 2013 (aged 90); Boca Raton, Florida, U.S.
- Batted: Right Threw: Right

MLB debut
- August 13, 1945, for the Philadelphia Athletics

Last MLB appearance
- May 13, 1956, for the Kansas City Athletics

MLB statistics
- Batting average: .254
- Home runs: 13
- Runs batted in: 156
- Stats at Baseball Reference

Teams
- Philadelphia / Kansas City Athletics (1945–1946; 1949–1956)

Joseph Henry Astroth (September 1, 1922 – May 3, 2013) was an American professional baseball player. He played his entire career in Major League Baseball as a catcher for the Philadelphia Athletics and remained with the team when they moved west and became the Kansas City Athletics in 1955. He batted and threw right-handed, stood 5 feet 9 inches (1.75 m) tall and weighed 187 pounds (85 kg).

== Early life ==
Astroth was born in East Alton, Illinois, and attended Wood River High School in Wood River, Illinois. After graduating from high school in 1940, he attended the University of Illinois at Urbana-Champaign where he competed in baseball, football and basketball. Astroth joined the United States Coast Guard in 1942 where, he served during World War II until his Honorable Discharge in 1945.

== Baseball career ==
Immediately after his discharge from the Coast Guard, Astroth signed a contract with the Philadelphia Athletics as an amateur free agent and, made his major league debut with the team on August 13, 1945 at the age of 22 without ever having played in the minor leagues. He played the majority of the 1946 season with the Lancaster Red Roses of the Interstate League before being promoted back to the Athletics for four games in September.

After two more seasons spent in the minor leagues, Astroth rejoined the Athletics in 1949 where he served as reserve catcher behind Mike Guerra. On September 23, 1950 Astroth had 6 runs batted in during the 6th inning of a game against the Washington Senators when, he hit a grand slam home run then followed with a two-run single later in the inning.

In 1951, Astroth had a career-high 30 runs scored in 64 games played. The following season, he posted his highest RBI total with 36 and in addition his high in home runs was five in the 1955 season. Athletics pitcher Bobby Shantz won 24 games in 1952 with Astroth as his catcher for 23 of the 24 games. Shantz cited Astroth as one of the biggest reasons for his success that year. Astroth led the American League catchers in 1953 with a 72.1% caught stealing percentage and 13 double plays.

On May 16, 1956, Astroth's contract was purchased from the Kansas City Athletics by the San Diego Padres of the Pacific Coast League. After one season in San Diego, he played two more seasons in the minor leagues for the Buffalo Bisons of the International League. He played in his final professional baseball game in 1958 at the age of 35.

== Career statistics ==
In a ten-year major league career, Astroth played in 544 games, accumulating 401 hits in 1,579 at bats for a .254 career batting average along with 13 home runs, 156 runs batted in and a .334 on-base percentage. He ended his career with a .987 fielding percentage. Astroth played in more than 100 games in two seasons, 1952 and 1955.

== Personal life and death ==
After his baseball career, Astroth ran two family businesses—a bowling alley and a dairy bar—before working for General Copper and Brass in Collingdale, Pennsylvania. He died on May 3, 2013, in Boca Raton, Florida, at the age of 90.

== See also ==
- List of Major League Baseball players who spent their entire career with one franchise
