= Alex George (baseball) =

American baseball player (born 1938)

- Shortstop
- Born: September 27, 1938 (age 87); Kansas City, Missouri, U.S.
- Batted: Left Threw: Right

MLB debut
- September 16, 1955, for the Kansas City Athletics

Last MLB appearance
- September 25, 1955, for the Kansas City Athletics

MLB statistics
- Batting average: .100
- Home runs: 0
- Runs batted in: 0
- Stats at Baseball Reference

Teams
- Kansas City Athletics (1955)

Alex Thomas Michael George (born September 27, 1938) is an American former professional baseball player. He appeared in five Major League Baseball games at the age of 16 as a shortstop and pinch hitter for the Kansas City Athletics during the 1955 season. George batted left-handed, threw right-handed, stood 5 feet 11 inches (1.80 m) tall and weighed 170 pounds (77 kg). He was signed by the Athletics during their first season in Kansas City out of Rockhurst, a local Jesuit high school. All of his Major League appearances took place before his 17th birthday. He struck out in his first Major League plate appearance against relief pitcher Al Papai of the Chicago White Sox, but four days later, on September 20, playing as the A's starting shortstop, he collected his only big league hit, a bunt single off Duke Maas of the Detroit Tigers.Sent to the minor leagues in 1956 for more experience, George never returned to the Majors. His playing career extended through 1963, mostly in the Kansas City system, where he played second base and outfield as well as shortstop and reached double figures in home runs four times in eight seasons.
