= Tim Thompson =

American baseball player (1924–2021)

- Catcher
- Born: March 1, 1924; Coalport, Pennsylvania, U.S.
- Died: October 25, 2021 (aged 97); Lewistown, Pennsylvania, U.S.
- Batted: Left Threw: Right

MLB debut
- April 20, 1954, for the Brooklyn Dodgers

Last MLB appearance
- April 27, 1958, for the Detroit Tigers

MLB statistics
- Batting average: .238
- Home runs: 8
- Runs batted in: 47
- Stats at Baseball Reference

Teams
- Brooklyn Dodgers (1954); Kansas City Athletics (1956–1957); Detroit Tigers (1958)

Charles Lemoine Thompson (March 1, 1924 – October 25, 2021) was an American professional baseball player and catcher in the Major Leagues. He appeared in 187 games over all or parts of four seasons (1954; 1956–58) for the Brooklyn Dodgers, Kansas City Athletics, and Detroit Tigers.

== Early life ==
Thompson was born in Coalport, Pennsylvania, the son of Maurice Frederick "Tommy" Thompson, a coal miner. He enlisted in the United States Navy during World War II, where he flew lighter-than-air K-class blimps built by Goodyear to patrol the Pacific coast for submarines and mines. Thompson was based out of Moffett Federal Airfield in the Silicon Valley. In 1945, he took a job on the third-shift manufacturing line at the America Viscose Company factory so he could play baseball during the day.

== Professional baseball career ==
Thompson batted left-handed and threw right-handed; he was listed as 5 feet 11 inches (1.80 m) tall and 190 pounds (86 kg). He broke into professional baseball after service in the navy, signing with the Brooklyn organization. Thompson's professional career extended for 16 seasons (1947–62) and included almost 1,500 games in the minor leagues. He made his MLB debut at age 30 on April 20, 1954, pinch-hitting for pitcher Clem Labine and fouling out to the catcher against Phillies pitcher Murry Dickson in a 6-3 Dodgers loss. Thompson's first hit came in his second at-bat, on May 14. Pinch-hitting for pitcher Joe Black against the St. Louis Cardinals' Vic Raschi, Thompson singled in the 10–1 Dodgers loss.

In 1956, Thompson was the Athletics' most-used starting catcher, starting in 63 games; he set personal bests that year in games played (92), hits (73), runs batted in (27) and batting average (.272). The following year, playing behind regular backstop Hal Smith, Thompson hit seven home runs in 81 games, but his average declined to .204. He then was included in a 12-player trade with the Tigers that November. Thompson appeared in four games with the Tigers, with one hit in six at bats, before he was acquired by the independently operated Toronto Maple Leafs of the Triple-A International League. He played almost five full years for the Leafs, until his retirement from the field at age 38 in 1962, and was the club's player-manager for the latter weeks of the 1961 season; the Leafs went 25–23 under Thompson but missed the playoffs. Thompson's 123 MLB hits included 24 doubles, two triples and eight home runs.

After his active career, Thompson was a coach for the St. Louis Cardinals in 1981 and scouted for the Cardinals, Dodgers and Baltimore Orioles.

== Personal life ==
Thompson was married to wife Lois right out of high school; as of 2020, they had been married 77 years. Their son Timmy Jr., who was born in 1945, played college and professional baseball; he died of cancer at age 63. Thompson died in Lewistown, Pennsylvania, on October 25, 2021, at the age of 97. His wife Lois died two days later.

Preceded by Johnny Lipon	Toronto Maple Leafs manager 1961	Succeeded by Chuck Dressen
