= Wally Burnette =

American baseball player

- Pitcher
- Born: June 20, 1929; Blairs, Virginia, U.S.
- Died: February 12, 2003 (aged 73); Danville, Virginia, U.S.
- Batted: Right Threw: Right

MLB debut
- July 15, 1956, for the Kansas City Athletics

Last MLB appearance
- June 28, 1958, for the Kansas City Athletics

MLB statistics
- Win–loss record: 14–21
- Earned run average: 3.56
- Strikeouts: 122
- Stats at Baseball Reference

Teams
- Kansas City Athletics (1956–1958)

Wallace Harper Burnette (June 20, 1929 – February 12, 2003) was an American professional baseball player who pitched for the Kansas City Athletics from 1956-1958. He was born in Blairs, Virginia.

In three seasons, he compiled a win–loss record of 14–21, appeared in 68 games, started 27 games, completing 5 games and once pitching a shutout, pitched 262.7 innings, walked 122, struck out 122, gave up 259 hits, and had a career ERA of 3.65. His key pitch was his knuckleball.

Burnette was signed as an amateur free agent by the New York Yankees, but was traded to Kansas City for future Hall of Fame manager Tommy Lasorda on July 11, 1956.

Burnette's daughter said of him:

He thought the salaries [current major leaguers] were drawing were ridiculous. What he made then wasn't even 1 percent of what they're making now. He played for the love of the game.

== See also ==
- List of knuckleball pitchers
