= Bill Wilson (outfielder) =

American baseball player (1928–2017)

- Center fielder
- Born: November 6, 1928; Central City, Nebraska, U.S.
- Died: July 1, 2017 (aged 88); Roseville, California, U.S.
- Batted: Right Threw: Right

MLB debut
- September 24, 1950, for the Chicago White Sox

Last MLB appearance
- September 13, 1955, for the Kansas City Athletics

MLB statistics
- Batting average: .222
- Home runs: 32
- Runs batted in: 77
- Stats at Baseball Reference

Teams
- Chicago White Sox (1950, 1953–1954); Philadelphia/Kansas City Athletics (1954–1955)

William Donald Wilson (November 6, 1928 – July 1, 2017) was an American professional baseball player. Wilson appeared in 224 games in Major League Baseball for the Chicago White Sox and the Philadelphia/Kansas City Athletics in 1950 and from 1953 to 1955, primarily as a center fielder. He threw and batted right-handed and was listed as 6 feet 2 inches (1.88 m) tall and 200 pounds (91 kg).

Wilson was born in Central City, Nebraska on November 6, 1928. His professional career began in 1947. Wilson was a power hitter in minor league baseball, hitting over 30 home runs for the Class B Wenatchee Chiefs (1948) and the Double-A Memphis Chickasaws (1950; 1953). Wilson led the 1948 Western International League in home runs (33), and twice led the Southern Association in that category with 36 (1950) and 34 (1953). He also led the 1950 Southern Association with 125 runs batted in.

Wilson hit 30 of his 32 big-league home runs for the Athletics after he was acquired from the White Sox on June 11, 1954. He hit the first home run in Kansas City's major league history with his solo shot off Van Fletcher in the eighth inning on April 12, 1955, opening day at Municipal Stadium for the newly transplanted Athletics. Wilson hit .232 and .223 in 1954–55, his two full big-league seasons. His 145 major league hits included 23 doubles and one triple, to go along with his 32 home runs. Wilson's career was confined to the minor leagues for the last six seasons.

Wilson died in Roseville, California on July 1, 2017, at the age of 88.
