= Gus Keriazakos =

American baseball player (1931–1996)

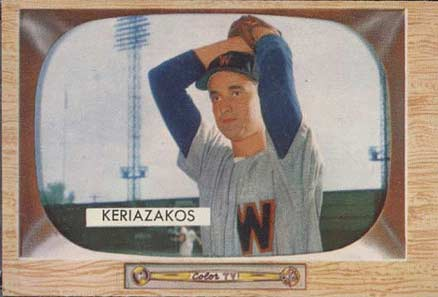
- Pitcher
- Born: July 28, 1931; West Orange, New Jersey, U.S.
- Died: May 4, 1996 (aged 64); Hilton Head, South Carolina, U.S.
- Batted: Right Threw: Right

MLB debut
- October 1, 1950, for the Chicago White Sox

Last MLB appearance
- September 23, 1955, for the Kansas City Athletics

MLB statistics
- Win–loss record: 2–5
- Earned run average: 5.62
- Strikeouts: 42
- Stats at Baseball Reference

Teams
- Chicago White Sox (1950); Washington Senators (1954); Kansas City Athletics (1955)

Constantine Nicholas "Gus" Keriazakos (July 28, 1931 – May 4, 1996) was an American professional baseball player. He was a 6 ft 3 in (1.91 m), 187 lb (85 kg) right-handed pitcher who worked in 28 games in the Major Leagues in 1950 and 1954–1955 for the Chicago White Sox, Washington Senators and Kansas City Athletics.

== Early life and education ==
A native of West Orange, New Jersey, Keriazakos attended Montclair High School, where he played baseball and basketball, and competed in track.

== Career ==
Keriazakos spent the entire 1954 campaign with Washington, appearing in 22 games, 19 in relief, and posting a creditable earned run average of 3.77. He started three times, and pitched complete games in two of them.

All told, he appeared in 28 MLB games and allowed 81 hits and 42 bases on balls with 42 strikeouts in 73 2/3 innings of work.

== See also ==
- Chicago White Sox all-time roster
