= Glenn Cox =

American baseball player (1931-2012)

- Pitcher
- Born: February 3, 1931; Montebello, California, U.S.
- Died: January 7, 2012 (aged 80); Los Molinos, California, U.S.
- Batted: Right Threw: Right

MLB debut
- September 20, 1955, for the Kansas City Athletics

Last MLB appearance
- April 23, 1958, for the Kansas City Athletics

MLB statistics
- Win–loss record: 1–4
- Earned run average: 6.39
- Strikeouts: 17
- Innings pitched: 432/3
- Stats at Baseball Reference

Teams
- Kansas City Athletics (1955–1958)

Glenn Melvin Cox (February 3, 1931 – January 7, 2012) was an American professional baseball player. The right-handed pitcher appeared in 17 games (with five starts) over parts of four seasons in Major League Baseball (1955–1958) for the Kansas City Athletics. The Montebello, California native was listed as 6 feet 2 inches (1.88 m) tall and 210 pounds (95 kg).

Cox's pro career lasted from 1950 to 1951, and from 1954 to 1959; he missed 1952–53 during the Korean War. In the Majors, Cox compiled a career record of 1–4, with his lone victory coming on July 13, 1957, in a 6–4 win over the defending world champion New York Yankees. In that game, Cox relieved starting pitcher Arnie Portocarrero in the sixth inning with the Yanks leading 4–2. He threw 21/3 innings of one-hit, shutout relief as the A's came back to take the lead. Cox exited the game in the eighth, and Tom Morgan nailed down the save for Kansas City.

In 432/3 big-league innings pitched, Cox surrendered 50 hits and 35 bases on balls. He struck out 17.
