= 1954 Philadelphia Athletics season =

1954 Philadelphia Athletics
- League: American League
- Ballpark: Connie Mack Stadium
- City: Philadelphia
- Record: 51–103 (.331)
- League place: 8th
- Owners: Earle Mack, Roy Mack
- Managers: Eddie Joost
- Television: WPTZ/WCAU/WFIL (By Saam, Claude Haring)
- Radio: WIBG/WIP (By Saam, Claude Haring, Herb Carneal)

The 1954 Philadelphia Athletics season involved the A's finishing eighth in the American League with a record of 51 wins and 103 losses, 60 games behind AL Champion Cleveland in their 54th and final season in Philadelphia, before moving to Kansas City, Missouri for the following season.

== Offseason ==
- February 19, 1954: Dave Philley was traded by the Athletics to the Cleveland Indians for Bill Upton and Lee Wheat.

== Regular season ==
The Athletics played the Philadelphia Phillies for the last time in their Philadelphia City Series on June 28, 1954 in the seventh annual Junior Baseball Federation of Philadelphia benefit exhibition game. The Phillies beat the Athletics 3 to 2 in 7 innings in front of 15,993 fans.

=== Season standings ===
American League
Team	W	L	Pct.	GB	Home	Road
Cleveland Indians	111	43	.721	—	59‍–‍18	52‍–‍25
New York Yankees	103	51	.669	8	54‍–‍23	49‍–‍28
Chicago White Sox	94	60	.610	17	45‍–‍32	49‍–‍28
Boston Red Sox	69	85	.448	42	38‍–‍39	31‍–‍46
Detroit Tigers	68	86	.442	43	35‍–‍42	33‍–‍44
Washington Senators	66	88	.429	45	37‍–‍41	29‍–‍47
Baltimore Orioles	54	100	.351	57	32‍–‍45	22‍–‍55
Philadelphia Athletics	51	103	.331	60	29‍–‍47	22‍–‍56

=== Record vs. opponents ===
1954 American League record Sources:
Team	BAL	BOS	CWS	CLE	DET	NYY	PHA	WSH
Baltimore	—	11–11	7–15	3–19	8–14	5–17	10–12	10–12
Boston	11–11	—	5–17	2–20–2	14–8	9–13	15–7	13–9
Chicago	15–7	17–5	—	11–11	12–10–1	7–15	17–5	15–7
Cleveland	19–3	20–2–2	11–11	—	14–8	11–11	18–4	18–4
Detroit	14–8	8–14	10–12–1	8–14	—	6–16	13–9	9–13
New York	17–5	13–9	15–7	11–11	16–6	—	18–4–1	13–9
Philadelphia	12–10	7–15	5–17	4–18	9–13	4–18–1	—	10–12–1
Washington	12–10	9–13	7–15	4–18	13–9	9–13	12–10–1	—

=== Notable transactions ===
- June 11, 1954: Morrie Martin and Ed McGhee were traded by the Athletics to the Chicago White Sox for Sonny Dixon, Al Sima, Bill Wilson, and $20,000.

1954 Philadelphia Athletics
Roster
Pitchers: 38 Charlie Bishop; 33 Moe Burtschy; 20,34 Art Ditmar; 24 Sonny Dixon; 37 Marion Fricano; 32 Johnny Gray; 22 Alex Kellner; 26 Morrie Martin; 17 Bill Oster; 25 Arnie Portocarrero; 43 Hal Raether; 49 Dutch Romberger; 49 Dick Rozek; 24 Carl Scheib; 30 Bobby Shantz; 26 Al Sima; 23 Bob Trice; 17 Bill Upton; 42 Ozzie Van Brabant; 40 Lee Wheat	Catchers: 9 Joe Astroth; 18 Jim Robertson; 11 Billy Shantz; Infielders: 4 Don Bollweg; 2 Joe DeMaestri; 15 Jim Finigan; 6 Spook Jacobs; 1 Eddie Joost; 14,48 Lou Limmer; 3 Jack Littrell; 12 Pete Suder	Outfielders: 16 Ed McGhee; 5 Vic Power; 8 Bill Renna; 20 Joe Taylor; 10 Elmer Valo; 40 Bill Wilson; 19 Gus Zernial	Manager: 1 Eddie Joost; Coaches: 29 Augie Galan; 35 Rollie Hemsley; 31 Les McCrabb; 28 Wally Moses

== Player stats ==
=== Batting ===
==== Starters by position ====
Note: Pos = Position; G = Games played; AB = At bats; H = Hits; Avg. = Batting average; HR = Home runs; RBI = Runs batted in

Pos	Player	G	AB	H	Avg.	HR	RBI
C	Joe Astroth	77	226	50	.221	1	23
1B	Lou Limmer	115	316	73	.231	14	32
2B	Spook Jacobs	132	508	131	.258	0	26
SS	Joe DeMaestri	146	539	124	.230	8	40
3B	Jim Finigan	136	487	147	.302	7	51
LF	Gus Zernial	97	336	84	.250	14	62
CF	Bill Wilson	94	323	77	.238	15	33
RF	Bill Renna	123	422	98	.232	13	53

==== Other batters ====
Note: G = Games played; AB = At bats; H = Hits; Avg. = Batting average; HR = Home runs; RBI = Runs batted in

Player	G	AB	H	Avg.	HR	RBI
Vic Power	127	462	118	.255	8	38
Don Bollweg	103	268	60	.224	5	24
Elmer Valo	95	224	48	.214	1	33
Pete Suder	69	205	41	.200	0	16
Billy Shantz	51	164	42	.256	1	17
Jim Robertson	63	147	27	.184	0	8
Joe Taylor	18	58	13	.224	1	8
Ed McGhee	21	53	11	.208	2	9
Eddie Joost	19	47	17	.362	1	9
Jack Littrell	9	30	9	.300	1	3

=== Pitching ===
==== Starting pitchers ====
Note: G = Games pitched; IP = Innings pitched; W = Wins; L = Losses; ERA = Earned run average; SO = Strikeouts

Player	G	IP	W	L	ERA	SO
Arnie Portocarrero	34	248.0	9	18	4.06	132
Alex Kellner	27	173.2	6	17	5.39	69
Bob Trice	19	119.0	7	8	5.60	22
Johnny Gray	18	105.0	3	12	6.51	51
Carl Scheib	1	2.0	0	1	22.50	1

==== Other pitchers ====
Note: G = Games pitched; IP = Innings pitched; W = Wins; L = Losses; ERA = Earned run average; SO = Strikeouts

Player	G	IP	W	L	ERA	SO
Marion Fricano	37	151.2	5	11	5.16	43
Charlie Bishop	20	96.0	4	6	4.41	34
Al Sima	29	79.1	2	5	5.22	36
Morrie Martin	13	52.2	2	4	5.47	24
Art Ditmar	14	39.1	1	4	6.41	14
Lee Wheat	8	28.1	0	2	5.72	7
Ozzie Van Brabant	9	26.2	0	2	7.09	10
Bill Oster	8	15.2	0	1	6.32	5
Bobby Shantz	2	8.0	1	0	7.88	3

==== Relief pitchers ====
Note: G = Games pitched; W = Wins; L = Losses; SV = Saves; ERA = Earned run average; SO = Strikeouts

Player	G	W	L	SV	ERA	SO
Moe Burtschy	46	5	4	4	3.80	54
Sonny Dixon	38	5	7	4	4.86	42
Dutch Romberger	10	1	1	0	11.49	6
Bill Upton	2	0	0	0	1.80	2
Dick Rozek	2	0	0	0	6.75	0
Hal Raether	1	0	0	0	4.50	0

== Farm system ==
Level	Team	League	Manager
AAA	Ottawa Athletics	International League	Les Bell and Taft Wright
A	Savannah Indians	Sally League	Clyde Kluttz
B	Lancaster Red Roses	Piedmont League	Kemp Wicker, Lena Blackburne and Buddy Walker
C	Drummondville A's	Provincial League	Hank Biasatti
D	Welch Miners	Appalachian League	Jack Crosswhite
D	Hopkinsville Hoppers	KITTY League	Ed Wright, Bearl Brooks and Paul Ramsey
