= Jim Robertson (baseball) =

American baseball player (1928-2015)

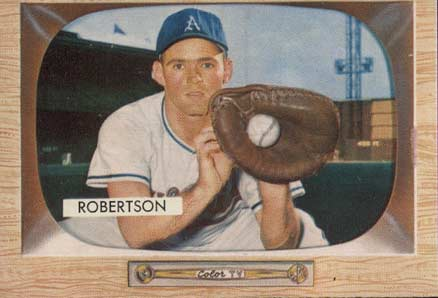
- Catcher
- Born: January 29, 1928; Chicago, Illinois, U.S.
- Died: October 21, 2015 (aged 87); Kirkland, Washington, U.S.
- Batted: Right Threw: Right

MLB debut
- April 15, 1954, for the Philadelphia Athletics

Last MLB appearance
- May 10, 1955, for the Kansas City Athletics

MLB statistics
- Batting average: .187
- Home runs: 0
- RBI: 8
- Stats at Baseball Reference

Teams
- Philadelphia / Kansas City Athletics (1954–1955)

Alfred James Robertson (January 29, 1928 - October 21, 2015) was an American Major League Baseball catcher who played in 69 games for the Philadelphia / Kansas City Athletics (1954–1955).

Prior to playing professionally, he attended Bradley University.

He was originally signed by the New York Yankees as an amateur free agent before the 1949 season, and he played in their farm system until 1953. In 1949, he played for the Grand Forks Chiefs, hitting .248 in 153 at-bats. He played for the Quincy Gems in 1950, hitting .295 in 404 at-bats. With the Muskegon Reds in 1951 he hit .288, and with the Binghamton Triplets in 1952 he hit .303. He split the 1953 season between the Kansas City Blues and Syracuse Chiefs, hitting .278 with the Blues and .264 with the Chiefs.

On December 16, 1953, Robertson was traded by the Yankees with Don Bollweg, Jim Finigan, Johnny Gray, Vic Power, and Bill Renna to the Philadelphia Athletics for Harry Byrd, Eddie Robinson, Tom Hamilton, Carmen Mauro, and Loren Babe.

On April 15, 1954, he made his big league debut. He spent his entire 1954 season with the Athletics, hitting .184 in 63 games (147 at-bats). In 1955, he played in six games for the (Kansas City) Athletics, hitting .250 in eight at-bats. He spent most of the 1955 season with the Portland Beavers, hitting .229 in 319 at-bats.

Robertson played his final big league game on May 10, 1955. Overall, he played in 69 big league games, hitting .187 in 155 at-bats.

Although his big league career was over, he still played in the minors until 1956. On December 2, 1955, he was purchased by the Seattle Rainiers of the Pacific Coast League, and in 36 at-bats with them in 1956, he hit .250. He was released by the Rainiers on June 1 of that year, and on June 15 he was sent from an unknown source to the Detroit Tigers. He played in 45 games with their minor league affiliate the Charleston Senators, hitting .246 in 122 at-bats.

On December 6, 1956, he was traded by the Tigers with Bobby Tiefenauer to the Toronto Maple Leafs for Archie Wilson and minor leaguer Don Griffin. He never played with Toronto.
