= 1954 Cleveland Indians season =

1954 Cleveland Indians
- American League champions
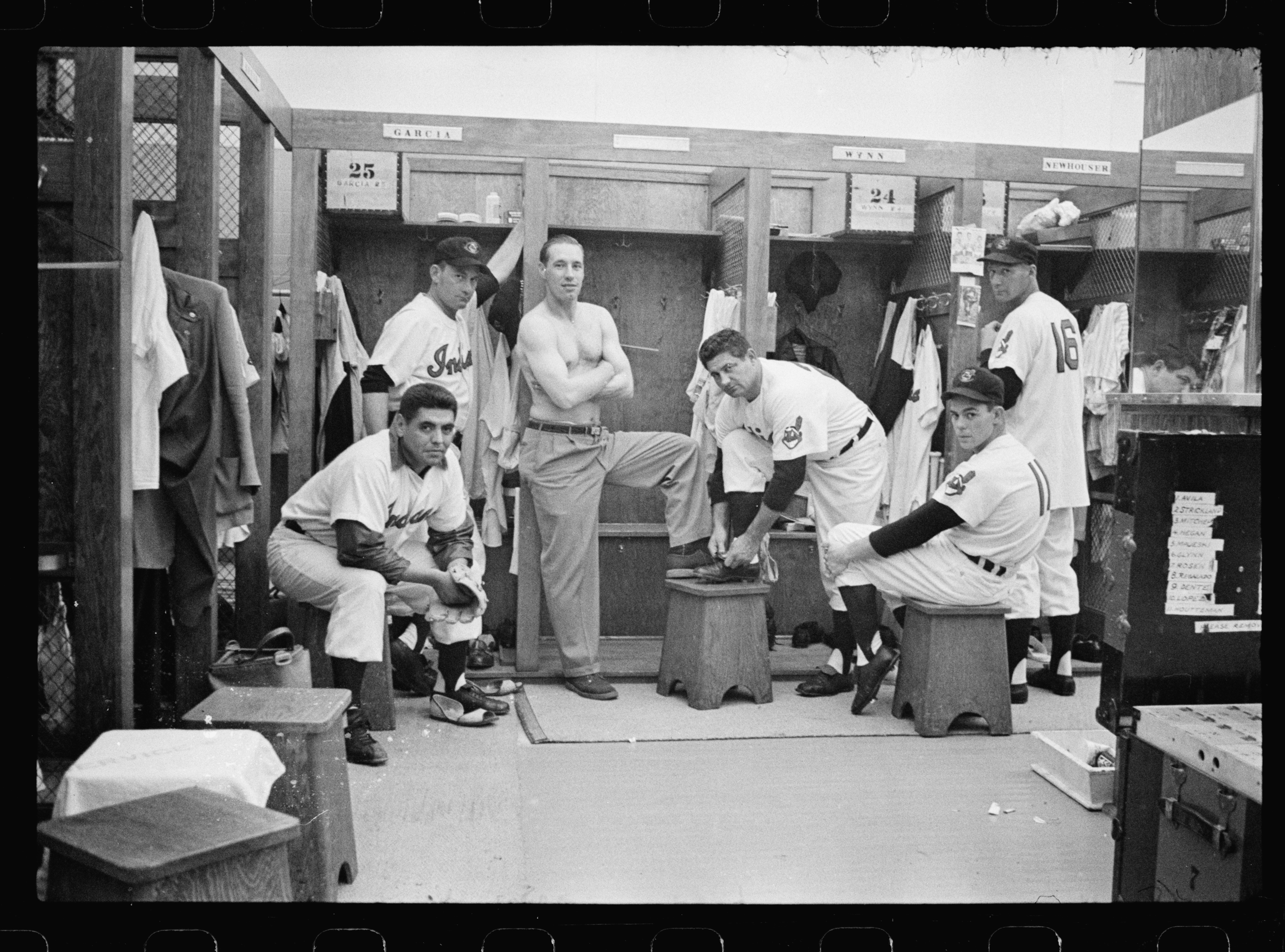
- Team shown in the locker room, 1954
- League: American League
- Ballpark: Cleveland Municipal Stadium
- City: Cleveland, Ohio
- Owners: Myron H. Wilson
- General managers: Hank Greenberg
- Managers: Al López
- Television: WXEL (Ken Coleman, Jim Britt)
- Radio: WERE (Jimmy Dudley, Ed Edwards)

The 1954 Cleveland Indians advanced to the World Series for the first time in six years. It was the team's third American League championship in franchise history. The Indians' 111–43 record is the all-time record for winning percentage by an American League team (.721), as this was before 162 games were played in a season.

For more than 60 years, Cleveland had been the only team in Major League Baseball to have compiled two different 11-game winning streaks within the same season, until the Toronto Blue Jays were able to accomplish the rare feat during the 2015 regular season.

However, their great regular-season record would not be enough to win the World Series, as the Indians got swept in four games by the New York Giants, after which the Indians would not return to the Fall Classic or any postseason play of any kind until 1995.

== Offseason ==
- February 19, 1954: Bill Upton and Lee Wheat were traded by the Indians to the Philadelphia Athletics for Dave Philley.

== Regular season ==
=== Season standings ===
American League
Team	W	L	Pct.	GB	Home	Road
Cleveland Indians	111	43	.721	—	59‍–‍18	52‍–‍25
New York Yankees	103	51	.669	8	54‍–‍23	49‍–‍28
Chicago White Sox	94	60	.610	17	45‍–‍32	49‍–‍28
Boston Red Sox	69	85	.448	42	38‍–‍39	31‍–‍46
Detroit Tigers	68	86	.442	43	35‍–‍42	33‍–‍44
Washington Senators	66	88	.429	45	37‍–‍41	29‍–‍47
Baltimore Orioles	54	100	.351	57	32‍–‍45	22‍–‍55
Philadelphia Athletics	51	103	.331	60	29‍–‍47	22‍–‍56

=== Record vs. opponents ===
1954 American League record Sources:
Team	BAL	BOS	CWS	CLE	DET	NYY	PHA	WSH
Baltimore	—	11–11	7–15	3–19	8–14	5–17	10–12	10–12
Boston	11–11	—	5–17	2–20–2	14–8	9–13	15–7	13–9
Chicago	15–7	17–5	—	11–11	12–10–1	7–15	17–5	15–7
Cleveland	19–3	20–2–2	11–11	—	14–8	11–11	18–4	18–4
Detroit	14–8	8–14	10–12–1	8–14	—	6–16	13–9	9–13
New York	17–5	13–9	15–7	11–11	16–6	—	18–4–1	13–9
Philadelphia	12–10	7–15	5–17	4–18	9–13	4–18–1	—	10–12–1
Washington	12–10	9–13	7–15	4–18	13–9	9–13	12–10–1	—

=== Notable transactions ===
- April 12, 1954: Hal Newhouser was signed as a free agent by the Indians.
- June 1, 1954: Bob Chakales was traded by the Indians to the Baltimore Orioles for Vic Wertz.

=== Roster ===
1954 Cleveland Indians
Roster
Pitchers: 23 Bob Chakales; 19 Bob Feller; 25 Mike Garcia; 26 Bob Hooper; 22 Dave Hoskins; 11 Art Houtteman; 21 Bob Lemon; 12 Don Mossi; 20 Ray Narleski; 16 Hal Newhouser; 38 José Santiago; 28 Dick Tomanek; 24 Early Wynn	Catchers: 15 Joe Ginsberg; 15 Mickey Grasso; 4 Jim Hegan; 18 Hal Naragon; Infielders: 1 Bobby Ávila; 36 Sam Dente; 6 Bill Glynn; 5 Hank Majeski; 37 Rocky Nelson; 8 Rudy Regalado; 7 Al Rosen; 2 George Strickland; 23 Vic Wertz	Outfielders: 14 Larry Doby; 33 Bob Kennedy; 3 Dale Mitchell; 17 Dave Philley; 34 Dave Pope; 32 Al Smith; 31 Wally Westlake; Other batters: 33 Jim Dyck; 9 Luke Easter	Manager: 10 Al López; Coaches: 44 Tony Cuccinello (Third base); 43 Mel Harder (Pitching); 42 Red Kress (First base); 40 Bill Lobe (Bullpen)

== Player stats ==
= Indicates team leader

= Indicates league leader

=== Batting ===
==== Starters by position ====
Note: Pos = Position; G = Games played; AB = At bats; H = Hits; Avg. = Batting average; HR = Home runs; RBI = Runs batted in

Pos	Player	G	AB	H	Avg.	HR	RBI
C	Jim Hegan	139	423	99	.234	11	40
1B	Vic Wertz	94	295	81	.275	14	48
2B	Bobby Ávila	143	555	189	.341	15	67
3B	Al Rosen	137	466	140	.300	24	102
SS	George Strickland	112	361	77	.213	6	37
LF	Al Smith	131	481	135	.281	11	50
CF	Larry Doby	153	577	157	.272	32	126
RF	Dave Philley	133	452	102	.226	12	60

==== Other batters ====
Note: G = Games played; AB = At bats; H = Hits; Avg. = Batting average; HR = Home runs; RBI = Runs batted in

Player	G	AB	H	Avg.	HR	RBI
Wally Westlake	85	240	63	.263	11	42
Rudy Regalado	65	180	45	.250	2	24
Bill Glynn	111	171	43	.251	5	18
Sam Dente	68	169	45	.266	1	19
Hank Majeski	57	121	34	.281	3	17
Dave Pope	60	102	30	.294	4	13
Hal Naragon	46	101	24	.238	0	12
Dale Mitchell	53	60	17	.283	1	6
Mickey Grasso	4	6	2	.333	1	1
Luke Easter	6	6	1	.167	0	0
Rocky Nelson	4	4	0	.000	0	0
Joe Ginsberg	3	2	1	.500	0	1
Jim Dyck	2	1	1	1.000	0	1
Bob Kennedy	1	0	0	----	0	0

=== Pitching ===
==== Starting pitchers ====
Note: G = Games pitched; IP = Innings pitched; W = Wins; L = Losses; ERA = Earned run average; SO = Strikeouts

Player	G	IP	W	L	ERA	SO
Early Wynn	40	270.2	23	11	2.73	155
Mike Garcia	45	258.2	19	8	2.64	129
Bob Lemon	36	258.1	23	7	2.72	110
Art Houtteman	32	188.0	15	7	3.35	68
Bob Feller	19	140.0	13	3	3.09	59

==== Relief pitchers ====
Note: G = Games pitched; W = Wins; L = Losses; SV = Saves; ERA = Earned run average; SO = Strikeouts

Player	G	W	L	SV	ERA	SO
Ray Narleski	42	3	3	13	2.22	52
Don Mossi	40	6	1	7	1.94	55
Hal Newhouser	26	7	2	7	2.51	25
Bob Hooper	17	0	0	2	2.72	12
Dave Hoskins	14	0	1	0	3.04	9
Bob Chakales	3	2	0	0	0.87	3
José Santiago	1	0	0	0	0.00	1
Dick Tomanek	1	0	0	0	5.40	0

== 1954 World Series ==
This was the first time (and only to date) that the Cleveland Indians were swept in a World Series. The only highlight for the Indians was that they kept the Yankees from winning their sixth straight series. The last time the Yankees had not won the series or pennant beforehand was 1948, when, again, the Indians kept them out (although that year, they won the Series). It was also the only World Series from 1949 to 1958 which did not feature the Yankees.

=== Game 1 ===
September 29, 1954, at the Polo Grounds in New York

Team	1	2	3	4	5	6	7	8	9	10	R	H	E
Cleveland (A)	2	0	0	0	0	0	0	0	0	0	2	8	0
New York (N)	0	0	2	0	0	0	0	0	0	3	5	9	3
W: Marv Grissom (1–0) L: Bob Lemon (0–1)
HR: NYG – Dusty Rhodes (1)

=== Game 2 ===
September 30, 1954, at the Polo Grounds in New York

Team	1	2	3	4	5	6	7	8	9	R	H	E
Cleveland (A)	1	0	0	0	0	0	0	0	0	1	8	0
New York (N)	0	0	0	0	2	0	1	0	x	3	4	0
W: Johnny Antonelli (1–0) L: Early Wynn (0–1)
HR: CLE – Al Smith (1) NYG – Dusty Rhodes (2)

=== Game 3 ===
October 1, 1954, at Cleveland Stadium in Cleveland, Ohio

Team	1	2	3	4	5	6	7	8	9	R	H	E
New York (N)	1	0	3	0	1	1	0	0	0	6	10	1
Cleveland (A)	0	0	0	0	0	0	1	1	0	2	4	2
W: Rubén Gómez (1–0) L: Mike Garcia (0–1) S: Hoyt Wilhelm (1)
HR: CLE – Vic Wertz (1)

=== Game 4 ===
October 2, 1954, at Cleveland Stadium in Cleveland, Ohio

Team	1	2	3	4	5	6	7	8	9	R	H	E
New York (N)	0	2	1	0	4	0	0	0	0	7	10	3
Cleveland (A)	0	0	0	0	3	0	1	0	0	4	6	2
W: Don Liddle (1–0) L: Bob Lemon (0–2) S: Johnny Antonelli (1)
HR: CLE – Hank Majeski (1)

== Composite Box ==
1954 World Series (4–0): New York Giants (N.L.) over Cleveland Indians (A.L.)

Team	1	2	3	4	5	6	7	8	9	10	R	H	E
New York Giants	1	2	6	0	7	1	1	0	0	3	21	33	7
Cleveland Indians	3	0	0	0	3	0	2	1	0	0	9	26	4
Total Attendance: 251,507 Average Attendance: 62,877
Winning Player's Share: – $11,118 Losing Player's Share – $6,713

== Award winners ==
All-Star Game

- Al Rosen, first baseman, starter
- Bobby Ávila, second baseman, starter
- Larry Doby, reserve
- Mike Garcia, reserve
- Bob Lemon, reserve

== Farm system ==
Level	Team	League	Manager
AAA	Indianapolis Indians	American Association	Kerby Farrell
A	Reading Indians	Eastern League	Pinky May
B	Keokuk Kernels	Illinois–Indiana–Iowa League	Jo-Jo White
B	Spartanburg Peaches	Tri-State League	Jimmy Bloodworth
C	Fargo-Moorhead Twins	Northern League	Phil Seghi
C	Sherbrooke Indians	Provincial League	Mark Wylie
D	Jacksonville Beach Sea Birds	Florida State League	Spud Chandler
D	Tifton Indians	Georgia–Florida League	Ed Hartness
D	Pauls Valley Raiders	Sooner State League	Lloyd Pearson and Bennie Warren

LEAGUE CHAMPIONS: Fargo-Moorhead

The 1954 Indianapolis Indians featured Herb Score and Rocky Colavito. Colavito hit 38 home runs and accumulated 116 RBIs.
