= 1954 Boston Red Sox season =

Major League Baseball season

1954 Boston Red Sox
- League: American League
- Ballpark: Fenway Park
- City: Boston, Massachusetts
- Record: 69–85 (.448)
- League place: 4th
- Owners: Tom Yawkey
- President: Tom Yawkey
- General managers: Joe Cronin
- Managers: Lou Boudreau
- Television: WBZ-TV, Ch. 4 and WNAC-TV, Ch. 7
- Radio: WHDH-AM 850 (Curt Gowdy, Bob Murphy, Tom Hussey)
- Stats: ESPN.com; Baseball Reference

The 1954 Boston Red Sox season was the 54th season in the franchise's Major League Baseball history. The Red Sox finished fourth in the American League (AL) with a record of 69 wins and 85 losses, 42 games behind the Cleveland Indians.

== Regular season ==
=== Season standings ===
American League
Team	W	L	Pct.	GB	Home	Road
Cleveland Indians	111	43	.721	—	59‍–‍18	52‍–‍25
New York Yankees	103	51	.669	8	54‍–‍23	49‍–‍28
Chicago White Sox	94	60	.610	17	45‍–‍32	49‍–‍28
Boston Red Sox	69	85	.448	42	38‍–‍39	31‍–‍46
Detroit Tigers	68	86	.442	43	35‍–‍42	33‍–‍44
Washington Senators	66	88	.429	45	37‍–‍41	29‍–‍47
Baltimore Orioles	54	100	.351	57	32‍–‍45	22‍–‍55
Philadelphia Athletics	51	103	.331	60	29‍–‍47	22‍–‍56

=== Record vs. opponents ===
1954 American League record Sources:
Team	BAL	BOS	CWS	CLE	DET	NYY	PHA	WSH
Baltimore	—	11–11	7–15	3–19	8–14	5–17	10–12	10–12
Boston	11–11	—	5–17	2–20–2	14–8	9–13	15–7	13–9
Chicago	15–7	17–5	—	11–11	12–10–1	7–15	17–5	15–7
Cleveland	19–3	20–2–2	11–11	—	14–8	11–11	18–4	18–4
Detroit	14–8	8–14	10–12–1	8–14	—	6–16	13–9	9–13
New York	17–5	13–9	15–7	11–11	16–6	—	18–4–1	13–9
Philadelphia	12–10	7–15	5–17	4–18	9–13	4–18–1	—	10–12–1
Washington	12–10	9–13	7–15	4–18	13–9	9–13	12–10–1	—

=== Opening Day lineup ===
8	Billy Consolo	2B
37	Jimmy Piersall	CF
30	Jackie Jensen	RF
1	George Kell	3B
10	Billy Goodman	LF
3	Dick Gernert	1B
22	Sammy White	C
5	Ted Lepcio	SS
17	Mel Parnell	P

=== Roster ===
1954 Boston Red Sox
Roster
Pitchers: 23 Tom Brewer; 27 Hal Brown; 26 Tex Clevenger; 15 Joe Dobson; 29 Bill Henry; 24 Tom Herrin; 20 Sid Hudson; 28 Tom Hurd; 24 Russ Kemmerer; 19 Leo Kiely; 16 Ellis Kinder; 21 Willard Nixon; 17 Mel Parnell; 18 Frank Sullivan; 14 Bill Werle	Catchers: 11 Mickey Owen; 22 Sammy White; 33 Del Wilber; Infielders: 6 Harry Agganis; 12 Floyd Baker; 2 Milt Bolling; 8 Billy Consolo; 3 Dick Gernert; 10 Billy Goodman; 1 Grady Hatton; 1 George Kell; 5 Ted Lepcio; 31 Sam Mele	Outfielders: 31 Hoot Evers; 30 Jackie Jensen; 32 Don Lenhardt; 35 Charlie Maxwell; 34 Karl Olson; 37 Jimmy Piersall; 9 Ted Williams; Other batters: 39 Guy Morton	Manager: 4 Lou Boudreau; Coaches: 41 Del Baker (First base); 15 Joe Dobson (Pitching); 40 Buster Mills (Third base); 45 Paul Schreiber (Hitting); 43 George Susce (Bullpen)

== Player stats ==
=== Batting ===
==== Starters by position ====
Note: Pos = Position; G = Games played; AB = At bats; H = Hits; Avg. = Batting average; HR = Home runs; RBI = Runs batted in

Pos	Player	G	AB	H	Avg.	HR	RBI
C	Sammy White	137	493	139	.282	14	75
1B	Harry Agganis	132	434	109	.251	11	57
2B	Ted Lepcio	116	398	102	.256	8	45
SS	Milt Bolling	113	370	92	.249	6	36
3B	Grady Hatton	99	302	85	.281	5	33
LF	Ted Williams	117	386	133	.345	29	89
CF	Jackie Jensen	152	580	160	.276	25	117
RF	Jimmy Piersall	133	474	135	.285	8	38

==== Other batters ====
Note: G = Games played; AB = At bats; H = Hits; Avg. = Batting average; HR = Home runs; RBI = Runs batted in

Player	G	AB	H	Avg.	HR	RBI
Billy Goodman	127	489	148	.303	1	36
Billy Consolo	91	242	55	.227	1	11
Karl Olson	101	227	59	.260	1	20
Sam Mele	42	132	42	.318	7	23
Charlie Maxwell	74	104	26	.250	0	5
George Kell	26	93	24	.258	0	10
Mickey Owen	32	68	16	.235	1	11
Don Lenhardt	44	66	18	.273	3	17
Del Wilber	24	61	8	.131	1	7
Dick Gernert	14	23	6	.261	0	1
Floyd Baker	21	20	4	.200	0	3
Hoot Evers	6	8	0	.000	0	0
Guy Morton Jr.	1	1	0	.000	0	0

=== Pitching ===
==== Starting pitchers ====
Note: G = Games pitched; IP = Innings pitched; W = Wins; L = Losses; ERA = Earned run average; SO = Strikeouts

Player	G	IP	W	L	ERA	SO
Frank Sullivan	36	206.1	15	12	3.14	124
Willard Nixon	31	199.2	11	12	4.06	102
Tom Brewer	33	162.2	10	9	4.65	69
Leo Kiely	28	131.0	5	8	3.50	59
Mel Parnell	19	92.1	3	7	3.70	38

==== Other pitchers ====
Note: G = Games pitched; IP = Innings pitched; W = Wins; L = Losses; ERA = Earned run average; SO = Strikeouts

Player	G	IP	W	L	ERA	SO
Bill Henry	24	95.2	3	7	4.52	38
Russ Kemmerer	19	75.1	5	3	3.82	37
Tex Clevenger	23	67.2	2	4	4.79	43

==== Relief pitchers ====
Note: G = Games pitched; W = Wins; L = Losses; SV = Saves; ERA = Earned run average; SO = Strikeouts

Player	G	W	L	SV	ERA	SO
Ellis Kinder	48	8	8	15	3.62	67
Hal Brown	40	1	8	0	4.12	66
Sid Hudson	33	3	4	5	4.42	27
Tom Hurd	16	2	0	1	3.03	14
Tom Herrin	14	1	2	0	7.31	8
Bill Werle	14	0	1	0	4.38	14
Joe Dobson	2	0	0	0	6.75	1

== Farm system ==
Level	Team	League	Manager
AAA	Louisville Colonels	American Association	Pinky Higgins
A	Albany Senators	Eastern League	Jack Burns
B	Greensboro Patriots	Carolina League	Eddie Popowski
C	San Jose Red Sox	California League	Red Marion
D	Bluefield Blue-Grays	Appalachian League	Len Okrie
D	Corning Red Sox	PONY League	Sheriff Robinson

LEAGUE CHAMPIONS: Louisville, Albany, Bluefield, Corning
