= Moe Burtschy =

American baseball player (1922-2004)

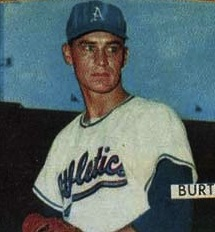
- Pitcher
- Born: April 18, 1922; Cincinnati, Ohio, U.S.
- Died: May 2, 2004 (aged 82); Cincinnati, Ohio, U.S.
- Batted: Right Threw: Right

MLB debut
- June 17, 1950, for the Philadelphia Athletics

Last MLB appearance
- June 9, 1956, for the Kansas City Athletics

MLB statistics
- Win–loss record: 10–6
- Earned run average: 4.71
- Strikeouts: 97
- Stats at Baseball Reference

Teams
- Philadelphia / Kansas City Athletics (1950–1951, 1954–1956)

Edward Frank "Moe" Burtschy (April 18, 1922 – May 2, 2004) was an American right-handed relief pitcher in Major League Baseball (MLB) who played for the Philadelphia / Kansas City Athletics (1950, 1951, 1954–56). He was listed as 6 feet 3 inches (1.91 m) tall and 208 pounds (94 kg).

He was born in Cincinnati. After graduating from high school in 1940, Burtschy signed a minor league contract, but he joined the Navy in September 1940 and served aboard the USS Ticonderoga. Following his military service, he returned to the minors in 1946, and, on June 17, 1950, he made his debut in the American League with the Athletics. Burtschy made the only start of his MLB career that year on August 1 against the Chicago White Sox at Comiskey Park; he allowed seven hits and six earned runs in 21/3 innings pitched, and absorbed the 8–1 defeat, his only big-league decision of the 1950 season. He missed much of the 1951 season with elbow surgery, and was assigned to Triple-A for all of 1952 and 1953.

He then spent all of 1954 with the Athletics, his only full year in the majors. In 46 games pitched, tied for fifth in the American League, Burtschy won five, lost four, and notched four saves for the 54th and last Philadelphia Athletics team. In one unusual appearance, on June 26, 1954, Burtschy replaced Dutch Romberger in the tenth inning of an Athletics game against the Baltimore Orioles. He walked Chuck Diering intentionally to load the bases. He then pitched wildly to Gil Coan who scored Dick Kryhoski with the winning run.

After two victories in seven relief stints in April and early May, Burtschy was optioned to the Portland Beavers of the Pacific Coast League by the relocated Kansas City Athletics in May 1955, and he posted an effective 3.02 earned run average in 29 games to earn another audition with parent Kansas City for 1956. He put up a 3–1 record in 21 games during the season's early weeks, hurling for a second-division team. On May 29, 1956, he pitched two innings of hitless relief against the White Sox, then fell apart in the 12th, yielding three walks and a sacrifice to give Chicago a 7–4 win. His last appearance for the Athletics came on June 9; despite facing the minimum of three batters and holding Baltimore off the scoreboard, he allowed two hits, but each Oriole baserunner was erased caught stealing on throws from Athletics' catcher Joe Ginsberg. Five days later, he was traded with outfielder Bill Renna to the New York Yankees in a four-player deal that brought veteran first baseman Eddie Robinson back to the Athletics. The Yankees sent Burtschy back to Triple-A, where he played for two years before retiring from the game.

In his 90-game MLB career, Burtschy compiled a 10–6 record, with 97 strikeouts, a 4.71 ERA, and four saves in 1851/3 innings pitched. After retiring, he worked as a freight salesman in the trucking industry.

In November 1999 Burtschy joined Lou Limmer, Gus Zernial, Forrest "Spook" Jacobs, Joe Astroth, Art Ditmar and Joe DeMaestri for a reunion of members of the 1954 Philadelphia Athletics. The event was organized by the Philadelphia Athletics Historical Society.

Moe Burtschy died of heart failure in Delhi Township, Ohio at the age of 82.
