= Romberger =

Romberger is a surname. It may refer to:

- Allen Isaiah "Dutch" Romberger (May 26, 1927 – May 26, 1983), a pitcher in Major League Baseball
- Gerhild Romberger, German contralto and academic teacher
- James Romberger (born 1958), an American fine artist and cartoonist known for his depictions of New York City's Lower East Side.
