= Vic Power =

Puerto Rican baseball player (1927–2005)

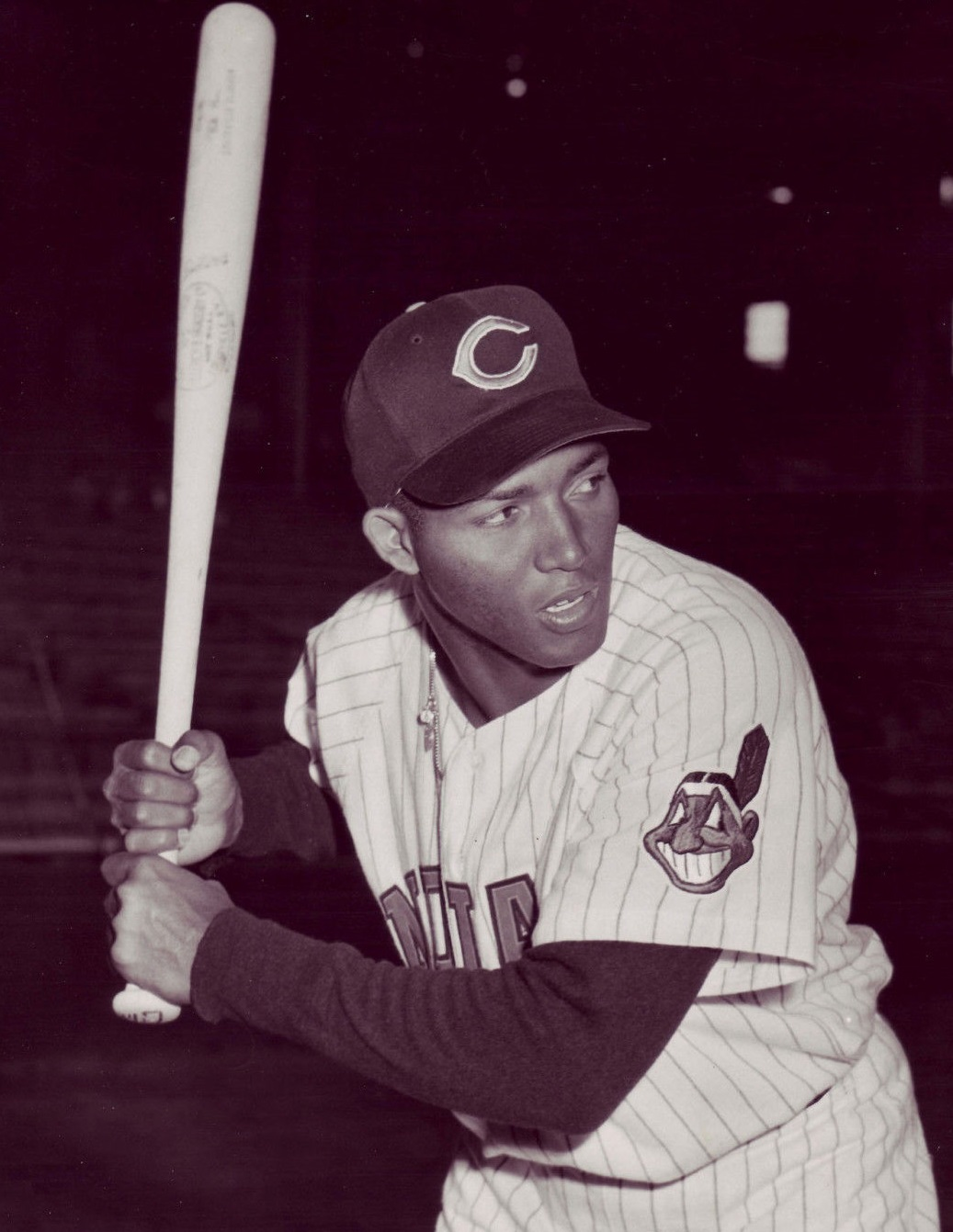
- Power in 1958
- First baseman
- Born: November 1, 1927; Arecibo, Puerto Rico
- Died: November 29, 2005 (aged 78); Bayamón, Puerto Rico
- Batted: Right Threw: Right

MLB debut
- April 13, 1954, for the Philadelphia Athletics

Last MLB appearance
- October 3, 1965, for the California Angels

MLB statistics
- Batting average: .284
- Home runs: 126
- Runs batted in: 658
- Stats at Baseball Reference

Teams
- Philadelphia / Kansas City Athletics (1954–1958); Cleveland Indians (1958–1961); Minnesota Twins (1962–1964); Los Angeles Angels (1964); Philadelphia Phillies (1964); Los Angeles / California Angels (1965)

Career highlights and awards
- 6× All-Star (1955, 1956, 1959–1960²); 7× Gold Glove Award (1958–1964)

Member of the Caribbean

Baseball Hall of Fame
- Induction: 2004

Victor Felipe Pellot Pové (November 1, 1927 – November 29, 2005), known professionally as Vic Power, was a Puerto Rican professional baseball first baseman. He played twelve seasons in Major League Baseball (MLB) for the Philadelphia / Kansas City Athletics, Cleveland Indians, Minnesota Twins, Los Angeles / California Angels, and Philadelphia Phillies, from 1954 through 1965. Pellot was the second Puerto Rican of African descent to play in the majors post-integration and the second Puerto Rican to play in the American League (AL), following Hiram Bithorn.

Pellot used the name Vic Power during his major league career, but played as Víctor Pellot when he played winter baseball in Puerto Rico. He was an AL All-Star for four seasons playing in five of the six All-Star games that were played, and won seven consecutive Gold Glove Awards. In 1955, Power and Luis Arroyo became the first Puerto Ricans to be selected to the MLB All-Star Game. He was also the first Puerto Rican to win the Golden Glove.

== Early life ==
Born Victor Felipe Pellot Pové, Pellot was born in Arecibo, Puerto Rico, the second child in a family of six (Pové was his mother's maiden name while Pellot was his father's surname, as is traditional in Hispanic culture, such as Roberto Enrique Clemente Walker). However, when his mother, Maximina Pové, was in the first grade, her teacher changed her last name, changing the "v" to a "w" and adding an "r" at the end due to believing she was too illiterate to spell her own name, and Pové became Power. Power showed an interest in baseball at a young age, but his father didn't want him to play baseball and would punish him if he caught him doing so. When he was thirteen years old, his father died and it was only then that he was able to play the game he loved. His mother moved to the city of Caguas, there he attended and graduated from José Gautier Benítez High School.

In 1946 Pellot started to practice with a local baseball team called the Senadores de San Juan (San Juan Senators) and learned many of his baseball skills. Vic Power joined Caguas-Guayama in 1946. He established a LBPPR record by stealing second, third and home twice. He was later invited to play for the Criollos de Caguas, where he was spotted by a New York Yankees scout. In 1949, he left for the City of Chicago and went to play for a minor league team in Drummondville, Quebec. He continued playing in the LBPPR and was the batting champion in 1955-56 (.358) and 1959-60 (.347), the first to do so playing different positions (third and first base). In 1959-60, Power also managed Caguas to the title.

== Minor leagues ==
Pellot was signed by the Yankees in 1951, and sent to the Syracuse Chiefs of the Class AAA International League. In 1952, Pellot played for the Kansas City Blues of the Class AAA American Association, where he led the league in doubles and triples, while posting a .331 batting average. The next season, Pellot led the league with a .349 batting average. However, despite his skills he was not invited to spring training in either year.

The Yankees' owners at the time, Del Webb and Dan Topping, felt that Power's playing style and personality wasn't suited for the conservative style that they wanted a "black" player to represent as a member of the club. Power dated light-skinned women, leading George Weiss, the general manager of the Yankees, to say that Pellot was "not the Yankee type". The Yankees also had Johnny Mize at first base, and another top prospect, Bill Skowron, in their farm system. Skowron spent most of the 1953 season at first base, while Pellot played 121 games in the outfield. When the Yankees had a need at the major league level, they promoted Gus Triandos, a Caucasian player from Class AA, instead of Pellot. The Yankees decided on Elston Howard to become the first black player in club history. Many blacks and Puerto Ricans protested in front of Yankee Stadium in response to what they believed to have been a racially motivated decision.

== MLB career ==
On December 16, 1953, Pellot was traded by the Yankees, along with Don Bollweg, Jim Finigan, Johnny Gray, Bill Renna, Jim Robertson, and $25,000 to the Philadelphia Athletics for Loren Babe, Harry Byrd, Tom Hamilton, Carmen Mauro and Eddie Robinson, thus becoming the first Puerto Rican to play for that team. Suffering from the racial discrimination which was rampant in the nation during that time, Pellot could neither stay with the rest of the team at the same hotels nor be allowed to eat at the same restaurants as his white teammates. The Athletics moved to Kansas City in 1955, where he finished in second place in the batting race. Pellot is one of only six or seven batters to have hit both a leadoff and walk-off home run in the same game (having done so in 1957), the others being Billy Hamilton (1893, disputed), Darin Erstad (2000), Reed Johnson (2003), Ian Kinsler (2009), Chris Young (2010), Pete Crow-Armstrong (2026), and Randy Arozarena (2026). His lead-off homer was one of four all-time hit on the first pitch of the game along with the two hit in 2026.

In 1958, Pellot was sent to the Cleveland Indians. During his 12-year career, he played with the Philadelphia / Kansas City Athletics (1954–58), Cleveland Indians (1958–61), Minnesota Twins (1962–64), Los Angeles Angels (1964), Philadelphia Phillies (1964), and California Angels (1965).

Before retiring, Pellot won seven consecutive Gold Glove Awards from when the award was first introduced in 1958 to 1964. He made the American League All-Star team with the Kansas City Athletics in 1955 and 1956 and the Cleveland Indians in 1959 and 1960 (two games were played both seasons). Pellot was also voted the Minnesota Twins Most Valuable Player (MVP) in 1962. He has the record of having made one or more assists in 16 consecutive game as a first baseman. At the age of 36, he won his final Gold Glove Award to be the oldest player to win the award at first base; this record was not surpassed until Yuli Gurriel won the first base Gold Glove at 37 in 2021.

He shares the record of making two unassisted double plays in one game, and he is one of 11 players to steal home plate twice in one game, and he also shares the record of being assists leader for six years in a row and of double plays in a single game. Among his career totals are the following: 1,716 hits and 126 home runs, and he was only struck out 247 times out of 6,046 at bats.

== Name history ==
In a letter to historian Bill Haber in 1993, Pellot gave his real, full name as Victor Felipe Pellot Pove; Pove being his mother's maiden name and Pellot his father's surname (as is traditional in Hispanic culture; see Roberto Enrique Clemente Walker). However, when his mother, Maximina Pove, was in the first grade, her teacher changed her last name, changing the "v" to a "w" and adding an "r" at the end.

During Pellot's first two professional seasons, in the French-Canadian town of Drummondville, Quebec, he went by his birth name, Victor Pellot. However, Pellot noticed that the mostly French-speaking crowd began to laugh whenever his name was announced. Initially, he surmised that the crowd was laughing because he was black. This turned out to be incorrect, and Pellot soon learned that the real source of the laughter was not his race, but his last name: the similar-sounding word plotte is slang for "vagina" in the Quebec French. In response, he played under the name of "Vic Power." He kept the name after getting promoted to the majors in United States, but retained "Pellot" when playing winter ball in Puerto Rico.

== Later years ==
Pellot spent his retirement in Guaynabo, Puerto Rico. The city built a ballpark, which he could see from the window of his apartment, and named it "Parque Victor Pellot" (Victor Pellot Park), after him. During the summers, he helped youngsters develop their baseball skills in both Puerto Rico and San Pedro de Macorís in the Dominican Republic. According to historian Bill James, Pellot was probably a main reason why San Pedro de Macorís became "the world's richest source of baseball talent". He was inducted into the Puerto Rico Sports Hall of Fame in 1981. Pellot is also a member of the Puerto Rican Baseball Hall of Fame and the Caribbean Series Hall of Fame. The municipality of Arecibo also inducted him into their regional hall. Pellot died on November 29, 2005, in Bayamón, Puerto Rico from cancer, at the age of 78. He was buried at Porta Coeli Cemetery in Bayamón Puerto Rico.

== Legacy ==
Pellot has been considered by many Puerto Ricans to be one of the island's greatest baseball players, a legend only surpassed by Roberto Clemente. In 2005, he spoke about his baseball career in the American documentary Beisbol, directed by Alan Swyer and narrated by Esai Morales, which covers the early influences and contributions of Hispanics to baseball. In 2000, the Cleveland Indians honored him by declaring him to be among its 100 all-time greatest players. He was named the 81st greatest first baseman in Major League history by historian Bill James in his book "The New Bill James Historical Baseball Abstract".

Pellot's unorthodox and often flashy approach to fielding first base proved over the years to be very influential. Although at the time he was often criticized by the press and his peers for fielding the ball using only one hand instead of two, stating it was "flamboyance", this would later become his trademark move. More importantly, it anticipated a change in how the position is played: nowadays, virtually all first basemen field the ball one-handed (this because it increases their reach and provides for greater flexibility).

Pellot is also remembered by baseball historians and fans for his sharp wit and dark, deadpan humor, a lot of which was directed at the racism and segregation he experienced during spring training in the southern United States. One of the more celebrated examples of his dark wit by which Pellot subverted the ugly rejection experienced through institutionalized racism, documented in David Maraniss's biography of Roberto Clemente, has Pellot entering a whites-only (segregated) restaurant while playing for Syracuse. Upon being told by the waitress that the restaurant didn't serve "Negroes", Pellot promptly told the waitress not to worry, that he didn't eat "Negroes".

== Bibliography ==
- Bjarkman, Peter C. (2005). Diamonds Around The Globe: The Encyclopedia Of International Baseball. Greenwood Publishing group. ISBN 0-313-32268-6.
- James, Bill (2003). The New Bill James Historical Baseball Abstract. Simon & Schuster. ISBN 0-684-80697-5.
- Moffi, Larry; Kronstadt, Jonathan (2006). Crossing the Line: Black Major Leaguers, 1947–1959. University of Nebraska Press. ISBN 978-0-8032-8316-9.

== See also ==
- Black history in Puerto Rico
- French immigration to Puerto Rico
- List of Major League Baseball annual triples leaders
- Players from Puerto Rico in MLB
- List of Puerto Ricans
