= Marion Fricano =

American baseball player (1923–1976)

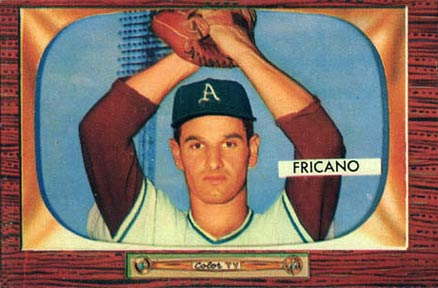
- Pitcher
- Born: July 15, 1923; Brant, New York, U.S.
- Died: May 18, 1976 (aged 52); Tijuana, Mexico
- Batted: Right Threw: Right

MLB debut
- September 6, 1952, for the Philadelphia Athletics

Last MLB appearance
- August 7, 1955, for the Kansas City Athletics

MLB statistics
- Win–loss record: 15–23
- Earned run average: 4.32
- Strikeouts: 115
- Stats at Baseball Reference

Teams
- Philadelphia / Kansas City Athletics (1952–1955)

Marion John Fricano (July 15, 1923 – May 18, 1976) was an American Major League Baseball pitcher for the Philadelphia and Kansas City Athletics. Fricano, a native of North Collins, New York, pitched in 88 games for the team from 1952–1955, starting in 43 games and attaining a 4.32 earned run average (ERA), 15 wins, 23 losses and two saves. Fricano hit Chicago White Sox hitter and former teammate Cass Michaels in the head on August 27, 1954, effectively ending his career. Fricano is also known for throwing the last pitch in Philadelphia Athletics history against the New York Yankees on September 26, 1954.

Fricano served in the United States Navy during World War II. While pitching at Cortland State University, the Brooklyn Dodgers signed him out of college in 1947. The Athletics acquired him in 1952 and he made his debut on September 6. Fricano would remain with the team through the end of the 1955 season, though his last game was on August 7, 1955, before being optioned to the Denver Bears. The Athletics traded Fricano to the Toronto Maple Leafs in a deal for fellow pitcher Jack Crimian. The Chicago White Sox would acquire Fricano in May 1956 before losing him in the Minor League Draft to the Seattle Rainiers, a Cincinnati Reds affiliate. Fricano would be traded to the Phoenix Giants in 1958 and remain there until the Dallas Rangers acquired him in 1959. He would remain with the Rangers until the end of his career in May 1961.

After leaving baseball, Fricano became a science teacher in Angola, New York before being elected as a Democratic Party member to the position of North Collins Town Supervisor. Fricano died on May 18, 1976 after a bout with pneumonia while on vacation in Tijuana, Mexico. Marion J. Fricano Park on U.S. Route 62 in North Collins is named in his honor.

== U.S. Navy ==
The 6 ft (1.8 m), 170 lb (77 kg) right-hander was born in Brant, New York, and raised in nearby North Collins. He briefly attended Cortland State University before enlisting in the United States Navy, and serving as a radio operator in the Amphibious Unit during World War II. After the war, Fricano signed with the Brooklyn Dodgers and began his professional baseball career at age 23 in 1947.

== Early years ==
Fricano spent five seasons in the Dodgers' farm system, compiling a 66–33 record and 3.24 earned run average when his contract was purchased by the Philadelphia Athletics early in the 1952 season. He went 17–8 with a 2.26 ERA for the Triple-A Ottawa A's to earn a call up to Philadelphia that September. Fricano made two appearances out of the bullpen, pitching a total of five innings, and allowing just one earned run. He earned his first major league win against the Detroit Tigers on September 12.

== Philadelphia Athletics ==
The following Spring, Fricano impressed A's manager Jimmy Dykes enough to earn himself a bullpen job for the start of the 1953 season. He made five relief appearances (all in losses) before making his first start in the second game of a May 22 doubleheader with the Boston Red Sox. After surrendering a first inning home run to Hoot Evers, Fricano held the Sox scoreless. The score was tied at one when Fricano led off the eighth with a double, then stole third. He came around to score the go-ahead run on Eddie Robinson's sacrifice fly. The lead, however, did not last, as the A's bullpen allowed a ninth inning run to send the game into extra innings.

He was even better in his second start, also against the Red Sox. Fricano allowed one run, a solo home run by center fielder Tom Umphlett in the ninth inning, on his way to the complete game victory. His heroics with the bat also continued. His second inning single drove (coincidentally) Cass Michaels home with the A's second run of the game.

The 1953 A's finished seventh of eight American League teams in runs scored (only the St. Louis Browns were worse) on their way to 95 losses. Hence, Fricano's 9–12 record is not indicative of how well he pitched. His 3.88 ERA was tops on his team, he was second on the Athletics' staff (and ninth overall in the A.L.) in innings pitched (211), and pitched ten complete games.

Fricano's fortunes reversed in 1954. After losing his first start of the season, he was moved into the bullpen. He ended up splitting his time fairly evenly between starts and relief appearances. Facing the Washington Senators on August 23, he was cruising along, having allowed just one hit into the fifth inning. After a two out walk to Eddie Yost the Senators followed with three consecutive singles to take a 3–1 lead. He ended up losing the game, and seeing his record fall to 5–9, and his ERA rise to 5.17.

== Cass Michaels game and Steve Gromek fight ==
Fricano was the starting pitcher against the Chicago White Sox on August 27, 1954, at Connie Mack Stadium. During the third inning, Fricano was battered around by White Sox batters, starting with Harry Dorish, the opposing pitcher. After the single by Dorish, Chico Carrasquel had a walk, followed by Nellie Fox hitting another single. Minnie Miñoso hit a bases-clearing triple off Fricano, though he would be thrown out at the plate during George Kell's at bat. Jim Rivera followed by hitting a triple off of the right field wall. After the Rivera triple, Fricano beaned former teammate Cass Michaels in the head. Michaels fell on the ground, bleeding from his ears after the hit. Michaels did not lose consciousness and staff rushed him to Presbyterian Hospital. Despite the attempt to brush Michaels back and protests from the small fanbase in attendance, Fricano continued to pitch, but Eddie Joost removed him after a home run to Johnny Groth, the next batter after Michaels.

Due to the bleeding, the staff could not do x-rays on Michaels until August 28, but staff noted that the protective plastic in his baseball cap kept him from further serious injuries. X-Rays stated that the impact fractured the skull of Michaels on the opposite side of where Fricano's pitch struck him. The doctor told White Sox manager Paul Richards that Michaels would have died on the spot if not for the plastic protection in his cap. By August 29, doctors noted that the third baseman was not in danger of fatal injuries from Fricano's pitch. However, the team declared that his 1954 season would be over after the incident.

While Michaels recovered in Chicago, Fricano made his next appearance on August 29 against the Detroit Tigers. In the ninth inning, Fricano hit opposing pitcher Steve Gromek in the back. Gromek, in response, charged the mound, punching at Fricano before putting him in a headlock and the two pitchers fell to the ground. The benches cleared to protect their teammates and the fight grew larger. Steve Souchock punched Bill Renna from behind and joined teammates in sitting on top of Renna. Lou Limmer threw a punch at Walter Dropo's head and sprained his thumb doing so.

After Schoolboy Rowe and Johnny Hopp broke up most of the fighting, they worked to split Fricano and Gromek, who were still on the ground. Fricano had Gromek in a headlock. As Fricano tried to get up, Harvey Kuenn climbed over his teammates and jumped on the back of Fricano, knocking him back to the ground. After fighting each other, Dropo and Gus Zernial separated but began fighting again when Kuenn jumped on Fricano's back. Fricano got up again, putting Dropo in a headlock and fighting off other players. That would mark the end of the fight. After the fight calmed down, the umpires ejected Fricano and Gromek from the game. After the game, Fricano left his residence in Philadelphia, driving to the Graterford Prison in Skippack Township, Pennsylvania to participate in an exhibition game the Athletics scheduled against prison inmates. Trying to avoid a child in the road, Fricano's car swerved and struck Jimmy Ferrier, a child on a bicycle. Ferrier ended up at Chestnut Hill Hospital for burns suffered in the accident.

The next day, American League President Will Harridge fined both Gromek and Fricano. Harridge stated that Fricano had a habit of throwing at batters on purpose and demanded Fricano knock it off or face more serious consequences. Harridge fined Gromek for charging Fricano at the mound.

On September 18, 1954, the hospital discharged Michaels during his recovery from the fracture. Michaels noted the previous day that the hospital gave him permission to depart for his home in Detroit, Michigan. For the 1955 season, the White Sox announced that all players would wear protective batting helmets in the future, to prevent further situations from occurring. However, Michaels collapsed during a workout on March 2 in Tampa, Florida during Spring Training and was rushed to Tampa Municipal Hospital. The doctors noted that the dizzy spell causing him to collapse was likely due to the hit by Fricano. Michaels was told that the head injuries sustained likely would end his career and he was pulled off the White Sox roster. While crying, Michaels signed a contract to stay with the White Sox as a scout. However, he noted that he would try one more time to get back in the majors in 1956. Despite Fricano visiting him three times in the hospital in 1954, Michaels stated that he could not remember anything Fricano said and wanted nothing to do with the pitcher anymore.

== Last hurler in Philadelphia's American League history ==
In 1954, Fricano had far more success as a reliever than starter. He went 4–11 with a 6.13 ERA as a starter, but was 1–0 with two saves and a 2.72 ERA out of the bullpen. On Sunday, September 26, 1954, the closing day of the Athletics' nightmarish, 103-loss campaign, Fricano took the mound at Yankee Stadium in the sixth inning in relief of Art Ditmar; the bases were loaded, with one out, and Philadelphia was clinging to a 6–4 lead. Fricano proceeded to throw a wild pitch, bringing the Yankees to within a run. He then issued an intentional walk to Mickey Mantle to re-load the bases, but set up a double play. Facing another Baseball Hall of Famer, Yogi Berra, Fricano induced Berra to bounce into a 3–6–3 twin-killing to end the inning and preserve the Athletics' lead. Philadelphia went on to win the contest, 8–6, with Fricano going the distance and getting credit for a save.

The contest turned out to be the cash-starved Athletics' last in Philadelphia's 54-year-old American League history. A complicated process that included an 11th-hour bid by Philadelphia interests to buy the Athletics ultimately saw Connie Mack's legendary franchise sold to industrialist Arnold Johnson and moved to Kansas City, Missouri, in the autumn of 1954.

In 1955, the A's found themselves in a new city with a new manager. Kansas City skipper Lou Boudreau used Fricano strictly out of the bullpen. His success as a reliever continued, however, Boudreau seemed to lack faith in Fricano. Despite a 0.82 ERA, Fricano had only been used in lopsided losses. Facing the New York Yankees on July 23, Fricano allowed two inherited runners to score, but did not allow an earned run of his own to bring his ERA to a season low of 0.77.

He pitched again three days later; this time he was hit hard by the Washington Senators. Roy Sievers led off with a home run. This was followed by a triple, double and single, as the Senators completed a reversed natural cycle on their way to scoring four runs in the inning. He pitched one more inning unscathed, however, his ERA now stood at 3.29. He made three more appearances, all in losses, before he was optioned to the Triple-A Denver Bears never to pitch in the major leagues again.

== Minor league career ==
=== Maple Leafs, Chicks, Rainiers and Giants (1956–1958) ===
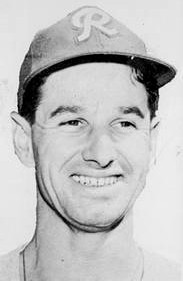
Fricano in 1957 as a member of the Seattle Rainiers of the Pacific Coast League

On October 11, 1955, the Athletics traded Fricano the Toronto Maple Leafs of the International League in a package along with a player to be named later and cash totaling around $60,000 (1955 USD). for Jack Crimian, a right-handed pitcher that was the "Most Valuable Pitcher' of the International League. Fricano officially signed with the Maple Leafs on March 9, 1956 alongside Ken Johnson. On May 16, 1956, the Chicago White Sox acquired Fricano along with Don Griffin from the Maple Leafs. Both would be assigned with the Memphis Chicks of the Southern Association. Fricano would suffer from arm issues during the 1956 season, but managed to make the playoffs with the Chicks, finishing with a 5–3 win/loss record. In the minor league draft in December, the Chicks would lose Fricano to the Seattle Rainiers of the Pacific Coast League for $7,500. Reporting to Spring Training in March 1957 at Perris Hill Park in San Bernardino, California, Lefty O'Doul announced that Fricano had agreed to terms for a contract for the 1957 season.

Fricano remained with the Rainiers until June 3, 1958, when General Manager Dewey Soriano announced that they traded Fricano to the Phoenix Giants for fellow right-handed pitcher Max Surkont. Up to the trade, Fricano had a 3.97 earned run average and had a 1–6 win/loss record. Fricano would get his first victory with the Giants on June 5 against his former team, after Felipe Alou hit a game-winning double off Ted Wieand. In a game against the San Diego Padres on September 2, 1958, heckling between both teams reached a boiling point when Bill Werle of the Padres stormed the first base coaching box where Fricano was standing. Werle tackled Fricano and started a benches clearing brawl, resulting in Fricano being unharmed while Werle hurt his upper lip. Both Fricano and Werle were ejected from the game after the fight. Fricano told The Buffalo Evening News after the season that the fight with Werle helped spark the team to clinch the Pacific Coast League pennant.

=== Dallas–Fort Worth Rangers (1959–1961) ===
Fricano would return to the Phoenix Giants for the 1959 season as one of the veteran presences in the clubhouse. However, in May 1959, the Dallas Rangers, an independent team in the American Association purchased Fricano from the Giants. Fricano made the American Association All-Star Team on July 7, 1959, replacing Dean Stone, who was called up to the St. Louis Cardinals.

Fricano stayed with the Rangers for the 1960 season. In a game on July 4, 1960, against the Charleston Senators, Fricano entered in relief and gave up a grand slam to Zoilo Versalles. The next batter, catcher Sam Mauney, would have a pitch thrown near his face that tipped off his bat, resulting in a foul ball. Angry at Fricano, Mauney charged the mound and the benches cleared. However, Fricano and Mauney were kept away from each other by their teammates, though they were yelling at each other. The home plate umpire, Barney Deary, noted that if Fricano threw at Mauney again, he would ejected along with his manager, Jim Fanning. Fricano told his catcher Don Leppert that if Mauney wanted to come at him again, let him.

After a short delay, Fricano threw high and inside again. Mauney, irritated, grabbed for his bat to charge after Fricano again. However, Deary stepped on the bat to keep Mauney from attaining it. Instead, Mauney chased after Fricano without the bat. Before Mauney could reach the pitcher, Leppert jumped on Mauney and they began to fight. Mauney and Leppert would both end up with lacerations near their eyes. While that fight was going on Del Wilber, the Senators manager, charged after Fricano and threw him in a headlock. After the fight ended, Fricano, Fanning, Mauney and Wilber were all ejected from the game.

Fricano, who also doubled as the pitching coach for the 1960 Rangers, finished the season with an 8–10 record, a drop from the 1959 season when he went 12-4 and led the American Association with a 2.02 ERA.

Fricano returned to the Rangers in 1961 with new manager Walker Cooper. Fricano, however, was late to start because of a late report on April 10. Fricano would end up making his first appearance of the season on April 27 against the Houston Buffaloes. On May 5, 1961, the Rangers announced they were cutting three pitchers to reach the 20-player limit of the American Association by May 15. Fricano, along with fellow pitchers Murray Wall and Bill Garcia. All were outrighted, though Wall would stick with the club for promotional work. Fricano finished the 1961 season with eight runs given in three games for the Rangers.

== Career statistics ==
=== Major leagues ===
Year	Team	Games	Games started	Innings pitched	Wins	Losses	Winning percentage	ERA
1952	Philadelphia (AL)	2	0	5.0	1	0	1.000	1.80
1953	Philadelphia (AL)	39	23	211.0	9	12	.429	3.88
1954	Philadelphia (AL)	37	20	151.2	5	11	.313	5.16
1955	Kansas City (AL)	10	0	20.0	0	0	.000	3.15
Totals		88	43	387.2	15	23	.395	4.32

=== Minor leagues ===
Year	Team	Games	Innings pitched	Wins	Losses	Percentage	ERA
1947	Johnstown Johnnies (Middle Atlantic League)	14	69.0	5	2	.714	4.96
1948	Valdosta Dodgers (Georgia–Florida League)	32	178.0	13	7	.650	3.13
1949	Nashua Dodgers (New England League)	17	134.0	11	3	.786	1.48
1949	Pueblo Dodgers (Western League)	15	87.0	10	2	.833	3.52
1950	Mobile Bears (Southern Association)	38	176.0	15	10	.600	4.09
1951	Mobile Bears (Southern Association)	33	159.0	10	9	.526	2.77
1951	St. Paul Saints (American Association)	9	35.0	2	0	1.000	4.89
1952	St. Paul Saints (American Association)	2	6.0	0	0	.000	
1952	Ottawa Athletics (International League)	30	191.0	17	8	.680	2.83
1955	Indianapolis Indians (American Association)	16					
1955	Denver Bears (American Association)	7					
1956	Toronto Maple Leafs (International League)	6		0	1	.000	
1956	Memphis Chicks (Southern Association)	25	92.0	5	3	.625	3.82
1957	Seattle Rainiers (Pacific Coast League)	36	163.0	10	11	.476	3.59
1958	Seattle Rainiers (Pacific Coast League)	10					
1958	Phoenix Giants (Pacific Coast League)	34		1	6	.142	3.97
1959	Phoenix Giants (Pacific Coast League)	4		0	1	.000	
1959	Dallas Rangers (American Association)	41	169.0	12	4	.750	2.02
1960	Dallas–Fort Worth Rangers (American Association)	51	140.0	8	10	.444	5.14
1961	Dallas–Fort Worth Rangers (American Association)	3	9.0	0	0	.000	

== Politics and death ==
During the 1955 World Series, the New York State Teachers College at Potsdam announced that they hired Fricano to be an assistant professor of health and physical education. Fricano enjoyed teaching and he planned to become a teacher once his pitching career was over. His hiring replaced Sam Molnar, a professor who was on sabbatical to finish his PhD at New York University. Fricano at that time had been wrapping up a master's degree from the University of Buffalo. The college also hired Fricano to be a coach for the basketball team.

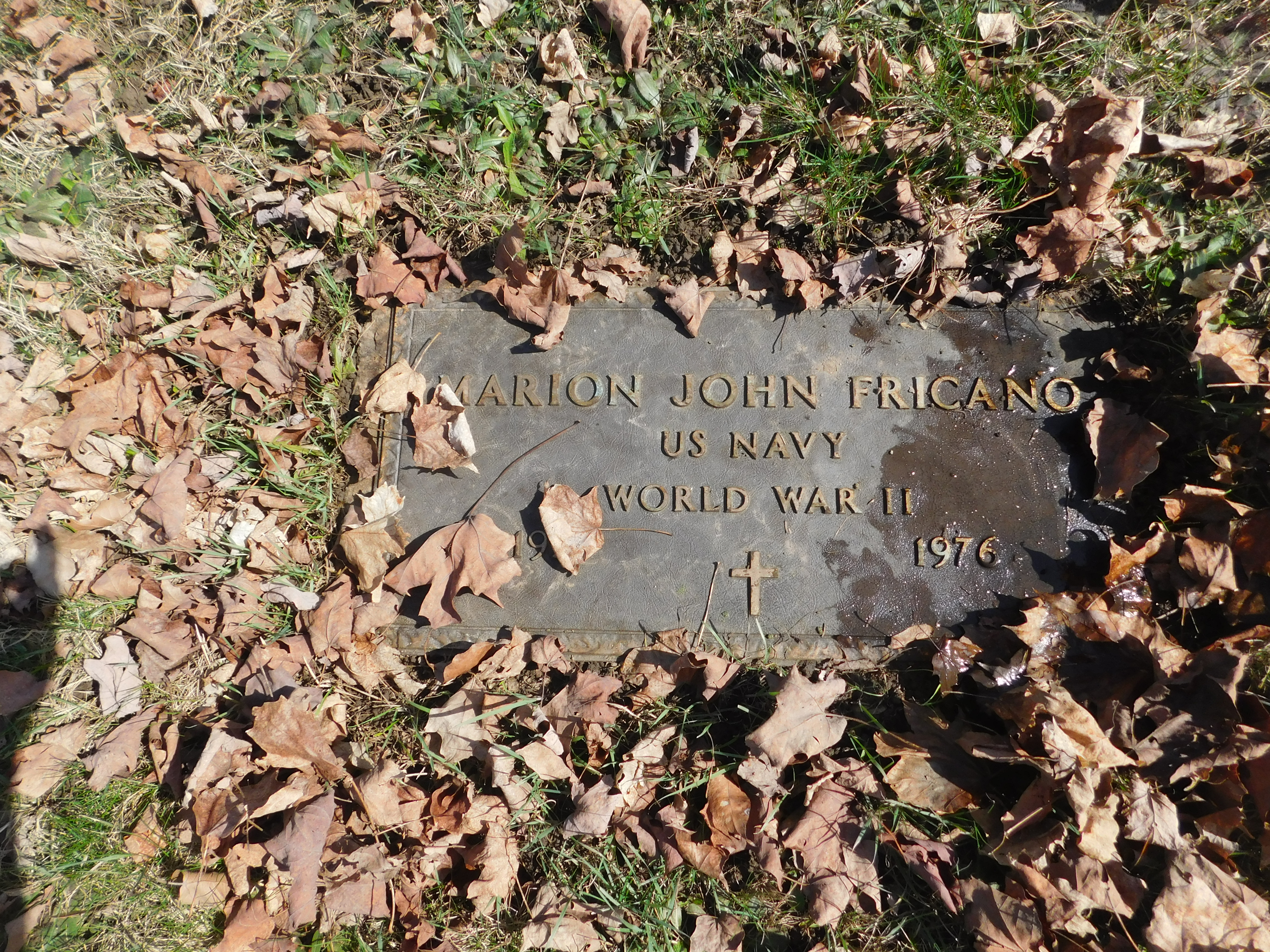
Fricano's grave at Holy Spirit Cemetery in North Collins, New York

Following his stint with the Dallas–Fort Worth Rangers, Fricano returned to North Collins, becoming a high school science teacher at Lake Shore High School. Fricano would be chosen in July 1961 as the Democratic Party's nominee for North Collins Town Supervisor. Residents elected Fricano North Collins Town Supervisor in 1961 and Fricano resigned from the school on January 26, 1962 to take the new position. Fricano also served in community relations for Gowanda State Hospital.

Fricano died on May 20, 1976 in a Tijuana, Baja California, Mexico hospital after being diagnosed with pneumonia while on vacation with his family. He was 52 years old. Fricano's funeral was at Holy Spirit Cemetery in North Collins.

On September 26, 1976, the town of North Collins and the Fricano family announced the dedication of Marion J. Fricano Memorial Town Park. In attendance, despite inclement weather, was Eugene Geiger, the Town Supervisor, Marza Fricano (the widow), the four Fricano children (Lori, John, M.J. and Lynda), and Marza's mother, Mary. Geiger noted that the town purchased the land along U.S. Route 62 in 1970 for the intent of creating a park in North Collins. Marion Fricano wanted a town park with sports and athletic facilities for the residents of the municipality to use.

Fricano, along with amateur players Phil Smolinski, Sam Gallineau and journalist Maury May were inducted in the inaugural class of the Western New York Baseball Hall of Fame in September 1997.

=== Electoral history ===
1966 New York State Assembly election, 148th district
Party	Candidate	Votes	%
Republican	Frank A. Walkley	24,602	67.76
Democratic	Marion J. Fricano	11,704	32.24
Total votes		36,306	100.00
Republican hold			

== Bibliography ==
- Lee, Bill (2015). The Baseball Necrology: The Post-Baseball Lives and Deaths of More Than 7,600 Major League Players and Others. Jefferson, North Carolina: McFarland and Company. ISBN 9780786442393.
