= 1954 Chicago White Sox season =

1954 Chicago White Sox
- League: American League
- Ballpark: Comiskey Park
- City: Chicago
- Owners: Grace Comiskey
- General managers: Frank Lane
- Managers: Paul Richards, Marty Marion
- Television: WGN-TV (Jack Brickhouse, Harry Creighton)
- Radio: WCFL (Bob Elson, Don Wells)

The 1954 Chicago White Sox season was the team's 54th season in the major leagues, and its 55th season overall. They finished with a record of 94–60, good enough for third place in the American League, 17 games behind the first place Cleveland Indians.

The 1954 Pale Hose were managed for their first 145 games by fourth-year skipper Paul Richards. But on September 13, 1954, Richards turned in his resignation to join the seventh-place Baltimore Orioles as both field manager and general manager. He departed with Chicago in third place at 91–54, 131/2 games behind Cleveland. Coach Marty Marion took the reins and directed the White Sox to a 3–6 record through season's end.

== Offseason ==
- November 30, 1953: Al Sima was drafted by the White Sox from the Washington Senators in the 1953 rule 5 draft.
- November 30, 1953: Carl Sawatski was selected off waivers by the White Sox from the Chicago Cubs.
- February 5, 1954: Neil Berry and Sam Mele were traded by the White Sox to the Baltimore Orioles for Johnny Groth and Johnny Lipon.

== Regular season ==
=== Season standings ===
American League
Team	W	L	Pct.	GB	Home	Road
Cleveland Indians	111	43	.721	—	59‍–‍18	52‍–‍25
New York Yankees	103	51	.669	8	54‍–‍23	49‍–‍28
Chicago White Sox	94	60	.610	17	45‍–‍32	49‍–‍28
Boston Red Sox	69	85	.448	42	38‍–‍39	31‍–‍46
Detroit Tigers	68	86	.442	43	35‍–‍42	33‍–‍44
Washington Senators	66	88	.429	45	37‍–‍41	29‍–‍47
Baltimore Orioles	54	100	.351	57	32‍–‍45	22‍–‍55
Philadelphia Athletics	51	103	.331	60	29‍–‍47	22‍–‍56

=== Record vs. opponents ===
1954 American League record Sources:
Team	BAL	BOS	CWS	CLE	DET	NYY	PHA	WSH
Baltimore	—	11–11	7–15	3–19	8–14	5–17	10–12	10–12
Boston	11–11	—	5–17	2–20–2	14–8	9–13	15–7	13–9
Chicago	15–7	17–5	—	11–11	12–10–1	7–15	17–5	15–7
Cleveland	19–3	20–2–2	11–11	—	14–8	11–11	18–4	18–4
Detroit	14–8	8–14	10–12–1	8–14	—	6–16	13–9	9–13
New York	17–5	13–9	15–7	11–11	16–6	—	18–4–1	13–9
Philadelphia	12–10	7–15	5–17	4–18	9–13	4–18–1	—	10–12–1
Washington	12–10	9–13	7–15	4–18	13–9	9–13	12–10–1	—

=== Opening Day lineup ===
- Chico Carrasquel, SS
- Nellie Fox, 2B
- Bob Boyd, LF
- Minnie Miñoso, 3B
- Ferris Fain, 1B
- Sherm Lollar, C
- Jim Rivera, RF
- Johnny Groth, CF
- Billy Pierce, P

=== Notable transactions ===
- June 11, 1954: Sonny Dixon, Al Sima, Bill Wilson, and $20,000 was traded by the White Sox to the Philadelphia Athletics for Morrie Martin and Ed McGhee.

=== Roster ===
1954 Chicago White Sox
Roster
Pitchers: 20 Sandy Consuegra; 12 Harry Dorish; 39 Tom Flanigan; 16 Mike Fornieles; 29 Jack Harshman; 26 Don Johnson; 15 Bob Keegan; 36 Morrie Martin; 19 Billy Pierce; 36 Al Sima; 35 Dick Strahs; 23 Virgil Trucks; 33 Vito Valentinetti	Catchers: 18 Matt Batts; 10 Sherm Lollar; 14 Carl Sawatski; 18 Red Wilson; Infielders: 17 Chico Carrasquel; 44 Phil Cavarretta; 8 Ferris Fain; 2 Nellie Fox; 3 Grady Hatton; 42 Ron Jackson; 21 Stan Jok; 1 George Kell; 33 Joe Kirrene; 25 Fred Marsh; 6 Cass Michaels	Outfielders: 31 Bob Boyd; 5 Johnny Groth; 27 Willard Marshall; 3 Ed McGhee; 9 Minnie Miñoso; 7 Jim Rivera; 21 Bud Stewart; 38 Bill Wilson; Other batters: 56 Bob Cain; 37 Don Nicholas	Manager: 28 Marty Marion; 22 Paul Richards; Coaches: 37 Ray Berres; 40 Luman Harris; 28 Marty Marion

== Player stats ==
= Indicates team leader

= Indicates league leader

=== Batting ===
Note: G = Games played; AB = At bats; R = Runs scored; H = Hits; 2B = Doubles; 3B = Triples; HR = Home runs; RBI = Runs batted in; BB = Base on balls; SO = Strikeouts; AVG = Batting average; SB = Stolen bases

Player	G	AB	R	H	2B	3B	HR	RBI	BB	SO	AVG	SB
Matt Batts, C	55	158	16	36	7	1	3	19	17	15	.228	0
Bob Boyd, LF, 1B	29	56	10	10	3	0	0	5	4	3	.179	2
Bob Cain, PR	1	0	1	0	0	0	0	0	0	0	.000	0
Chico Carrasquel, SS	155	620	106	158	28	3	12	62	85	67	.255	7
Phil Cavarretta, 1B, RF, LF	71	158	21	50	6	0	3	24	26	12	.316	4
Ferris Fain, 1B	65	235	30	71	10	1	5	51	40	14	.302	5
Nellie Fox, 2B	155	631	111	201	24	8	2	47	51	12	.319	16
Johnny Groth, CF, LF	125	422	41	116	20	0	7	60	42	37	.275	3
Grady Hatton, 3B	13	30	3	5	1	0	0	3	5	3	.167	1
Ron Jackson, 1B	40	93	10	26	4	0	4	10	6	20	.280	2
Stan Jok, 3B	3	12	1	2	0	0	0	2	1	2	.167	0
George Kell, 1B, 3B	71	233	25	66	10	0	5	48	18	12	.283	1
Joe Kirrene, 3B	9	23	4	7	1	0	0	4	5	2	.304	1
Sherm Lollar, C	107	316	31	77	13	0	7	34	37	28	.244	0
Fred Marsh, 3B	62	98	21	30	5	2	0	4	9	16	.306	4
Willard Marshall, RF, LF	47	71	7	18	2	0	1	7	11	9	.254	0
Ed McGhee, OF	42	75	12	17	1	0	0	5	12	8	.227	5
Cass Michaels, 3B	101	282	35	74	13	2	7	44	56	31	.262	10
Minnie Miñoso, LF, RF, CF, 3B	153	568	119	182	29	18	19	116	77	46	.320	18
Don Nicholas, PR, PH	7	0	3	0	0	0	0	0	1	0	.000	0
Jim Rivera, RF, CF	145	490	62	140	16	8	13	61	49	68	.286	18
Carl Sawatski, C	43	109	6	20	3	3	1	12	15	20	.183	0
Bud Stewart, RF	18	13	0	1	0	0	0	0	3	2	.077	0
Bill Wilson, LF, RF	20	35	4	6	1	0	2	5	7	5	.171	0
Red Wilson, C	8	20	2	4	0	0	1	1	1	2	.200	0

Player	G	AB	R	H	2B	3B	HR	RBI	BB	SO	AVG	SB
Sandy Consuegra, P	39	48	4	11	0	0	0	3	3	11	.229	0
Fritz Dorish, P	37	27	3	3	0	0	0	0	0	5	.111	0
Mike Fornieles, P	16	11	2	3	0	0	0	0	0	0	.273	1
Jack Harshman, P	36	56	6	8	1	0	2	5	12	21	.143	0
Don Johnson, P	46	35	0	1	0	0	0	1	2	12	.029	0
Bob Keegan, P	32	75	5	9	2	1	0	7	4	11	.120	0
Morrie Martin, P	35	15	1	2	1	0	0	2	0	6	.133	0
Billy Pierce, P	38	57	4	11	0	0	0	5	4	12	.193	0
Al Sima, P	5	2	0	0	0	0	0	0	0	2	.000	0
Dick Strahs, P	9	1	0	0	0	0	0	0	0	1	.000	0
Virgil Trucks, P	40	93	5	17	2	0	0	8	1	21	.183	0
Team totals	155	5168	711	1382	203	47	94	655	604	536	.267	98

=== Pitching ===
Note: W = Wins; L = Losses; ERA = Earned run average; G = Games pitched; GS = Games started; SV = Saves; IP = Innings pitched; H = Hits allowed; R = Runs allowed; ER = Earned runs allowed; HR = Home runs allowed; BB = Walks allowed; K = Strikeouts

Player	W	L	ERA	G	GS	SV	IP	H	R	ER	HR	BB	K
Sandy Consuegra	16	3	2.69	39	17	3	154.0	142	52	46	9	35	31
Fritz Dorish	6	4	2.72	37	6	6	109.0	88	35	33	9	29	48
Tom Flanigan	0	0	0.00	2	0	0	1.2	1	0	0	0	1	0
Mike Fornieles	1	2	4.29	15	6	1	42.0	41	24	20	4	14	18
Jack Harshman	14	8	2.95	35	21	1	177.0	157	61	58	7	96	134
Don Johnson	8	7	3.13	46	16	7	144.0	129	53	50	14	43	68
Bob Keegan	16	9	3.09	31	27	2	209.2	211	84	72	16	82	61
Morrie Martin	5	4	2.06	35	2	5	70.0	52	18	16	5	24	31
Billy Pierce	9	10	3.48	36	26	3	188.2	179	86	73	15	86	148
Al Sima	0	1	5.14	5	1	1	7.0	11	5	4	1	2	1
Dick Strahs	0	0	5.65	9	0	1	14.1	16	10	9	0	8	8
Virgil Trucks	19	12	2.79	40	33	3	264.2	224	87	82	13	95	152
Vito Valentinetti	0	0	54.00	1	0	0	1.0	4	6	6	1	2	1
Team totals	94	60	3.05	155	155	33	1383.0	1255	521	469	94	517	701

== Farm system ==
Level	Team	League	Manager
AAA	Charleston Senators	American Association	Joe Becker
AA	Memphis Chicks	Southern Association	Don Gutteridge
A	Colorado Springs Sky Sox	Western League	Mickey Livingston, Bud Stewart and Al Jacinto
B	Waterloo White Hawks	Illinois–Indiana–Iowa League	Wally Millies
C	Topeka Owls	Western Association	Ira Hutchinson
D	Madisonville Miners	KITTY League	Bob Latshaw and Bill Close
D	Dubuque Packers	Mississippi–Ohio Valley League	Jack Conway
