= Bill Oster =

American baseball player (1933–2020)

- Pitcher
- Born: January 2, 1933; New York City, New York, U.S.
- Died: June 6, 2020 (aged 87); Centerport, New York, U.S.
- Batted: Left Threw: Left

MLB debut
- August 23, 1954, for the Philadelphia Athletics

Last MLB appearance
- September 25, 1954, for the Philadelphia Athletics

MLB statistics
- Win–loss record: 0–1
- Earned run average: 6.32
- Strikeouts: 5
- Stats at Baseball Reference

Teams
- Philadelphia Athletics (1954)

William Charles Oster (January 2, 1933 – June 6, 2020) was an American professional baseball pitcher, a left-hander who appeared in eight games in Major League Baseball for the Philadelphia Athletics during the 1954 season. Born in New York City, Oster was listed as 6 feet 3 inches (1.91 m) tall and 198 pounds (90 kg). He attended New York University.

Oster was signed by the Athletics as an amateur free agent on August 20, 1954, and made his MLB debut three days later. His only decision came a little over a month later in his final MLB game when the Athletics were defeated by the New York Yankees, 10–2. The game, Oster's only big-league starting pitcher assignment, was played at Yankee Stadium in Oster's home city. He allowed one earned run, three hits and five bases on balls in three innings of work before exiting for a pinch hitter, trailing 4–1.

In his eight career MLB appearances, he worked in 152/3 innings and allowed 19 hits, 12 bases in balls, and 15 runs, 11 of them earned. He struck out five.

Oster's professional career continued in the minor leagues into the 1957 campaign. He died on June 6, 2020, in Centerport, New York.
