= Ozzie Van Brabant =

Canadian baseball player (1926–2018)

- Pitcher
- Born: September 28, 1926; Kingsville, Ontario, Canada
- Died: August 18, 2018 (aged 91); La Jolla, California, U.S.
- Batted: Right Threw: Right

MLB debut
- April 13, 1954, for the Philadelphia Athletics

Last MLB appearance
- April 23, 1955, for the Kansas City Athletics

MLB statistics
- Win–loss record: 0–2
- Earned run average: 7.85
- Strikeouts: 11
- Innings pitched: 282/3
- Stats at Baseball Reference

Teams
- Philadelphia/Kansas City Athletics (1954–1955)

Camille Oscar Van Brabant (September 28, 1926 – August 18, 2018) was a Canadian professional baseball player. A right-handed pitcher, he appeared in 11 Major League Baseball games — nine for the 1954 Philadelphia Athletics (the club's final year in Philadelphia) and two for the 1955 Kansas City Athletics (its maiden season in Kansas City). He was born in Kingsville, Ontario. He was listed as 6 feet 1 inch (1.85 m) tall and 165 pounds (75 kg) (11 stone, 11 pounds).

Van Brabant's pro career lasted for four seasons. He broke into the minor leagues at age 25 with the 1952 Lincoln A's, winning 14 games, and then captured 16 of 31 decisions the following season with the Williamsport A's. He split 1954 between the Triple-A Ottawa Athletics and the parent team in Philadelphia. Van Brabant lost his only two big-league starting assignments, both times to the Boston Red Sox, who defeated him 9–0 on May 31, 1954, and 4–3 on September 21. The two defeats represented his only two decisions in the Major Leagues. As a big leaguer, Van Brabant gave up 39 hits and 20 bases on balls in 282/3 innings of work, with 11 strikeouts. He retired after the 1955 season.

Van Brabant died on August 18, 2018, at the age of 91.
