= Lee Wheat =

American baseball player (1929–2008)

- Pitcher
- Born: September 15, 1929; Edwardsville, Illinois, U.S.
- Died: July 29, 2008 (aged 78); Fort Lauderdale, Florida, U.S.
- Batted: Right Threw: Right

MLB debut
- April 21, 1954, for the Philadelphia Athletics

Last MLB appearance
- April 23, 1955, for the Kansas City Athletics

MLB statistics
- Win–loss record: 0–2
- Earned run average: 6.82
- Strikeouts: 8
- Stats at Baseball Reference

Teams
- Philadelphia/Kansas City Athletics (1954–1955)

Leroy William Wheat (September 15, 1929 – July 29, 2008) was an American professional baseball pitcher who worked in 11 career Major League Baseball games for the 1954 Philadelphia Athletics and 1955's maiden edition of the Kansas City Athletics. A right-hander, Wheat stood 6 feet 4 inches (1.93 m) tall and was listed as 200 pounds (91 kg).

Wheat was born in Edwardsville, Illinois, and attended Truman State University and the University of Missouri. He was originally signed by the Cleveland Indians prior to the 1948 season, but after four years in the Indians' farm system and one year performing Korean War-era military service, he was traded to the Philadelphia Athletics on February 19, 1954, with Bill Upton for Dave Philley.

Wheat began his major league career on April 21, 1954, at the age of 24 against the Washington Senators. Relieving Marion Fricano, Wheat pitched three innings, allowing six runs on five hits and five walks. Spending much of 1954 with the Triple-A Ottawa A's, he went 0–2 in eight MLB games with a 5.72 earned run average. His final appearance, on September 25 of that year, was the penultimate game of the Athletics' 54-year history in Philadelphia. The following season, the franchise moved to Kansas City, Missouri.

He appeared in three games for the relocated 1955 Athletics, going 0–0 with a 22.50 ERA. On April 23, he appeared in his final major league game. Wheat spent the rest of 1955 with Triple-A Columbus. The following April 16, he was traded to the Brooklyn Dodgers with Tom Saffell and cash for Tim Thompson. He spent 1956 and 1957 in Triple-A, did not play professionally in 1958, and wrapped up his pro tenure with the Double-A New Orleans.

All told, in his 11 MLB games, including one appearance as a starting pitcher, Wheat posted an 0–2 won–lost record and no saves. In 301/3 innings pitched he surrendered 46 hits and 12 walks, along with 23 earned runs for a career ERA of 6.82. He fanned eight.

Wheat spent nine seasons playing minor league baseball, going 51–49 in 224 games. In 1949, his first professional season, he went 17–9 with a 2.77 ERA for the Dayton Indians.
