= Arnie Portocarrero =

American baseball player (1931–1986)

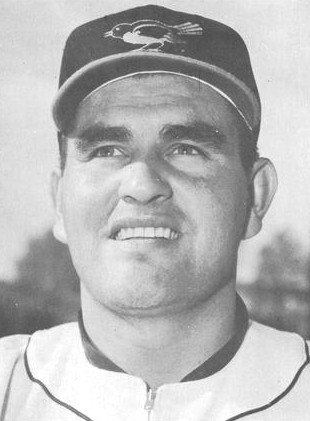
- Pitcher
- Born: July 5, 1931; New York City, New York, U.S.
- Died: June 21, 1986 (aged 54); Kansas City, Kansas, U.S.
- Batted: Right Threw: Right

MLB debut
- April 18, 1954, for the Philadelphia Athletics

Last MLB appearance
- June 15, 1960, for the Baltimore Orioles

MLB statistics
- Win–loss record: 38–57
- Earned run average: 4.32
- Strikeouts: 338
- Stats at Baseball Reference

Teams
- Philadelphia / Kansas City Athletics (1954–1957); Baltimore Orioles (1958–1960)

Arnold Mario Portocarrero (July 5, 1931 – June 21, 1986) was an American professional baseball player and right-handed pitcher who appeared in 166 games pitched in the major leagues over all or parts of seven seasons for the Philadelphia / Kansas City Athletics and Baltimore Orioles. Born in New York City of Puerto Rican descent, he was listed as 6 feet 3 inches (1.91 m) tall and 196 pounds (89 kg).

Signed by the Athletics after he graduated from New York's George Washington High School, Portocarrero broke in with Philadelphia in 1954 after only two years of minor league experience and two years in the United States Army during the Korean War. In his first year in the majors, he was a franchise hope for the Athletics, who were in desperate shape both on the field and financially. It was hoped that the team might be good enough to improve attendance at Philadelphia's Connie Mack Stadium. The year before, some A's games had fewer than 2,000 people in the stands.

But the 1954 Athletics lost 103 games and finished last. Portocarrero posted a 9–18 record with a 4.06 earned run average; he finished second in the American League in games lost to Don Larsen of the Orioles and he led the league in wild pitches. The Athletics' gate receipts did not improve, either. The team was sold to Arnold Johnson, a Chicago investor, and moved from Philadelphia to Kansas City. But Portocarrero struggled with arm miseries during 1955, the A's first season in Kansas City, and spent part of 1956 back in the minors. He returned to the Athletics in 1957 but failed to regain a regular spot in the Kansas City starting rotation. He worked in 33 games, with 17 starts, and went 4–9 (3.92).

Portocarrero was traded from the Athletics to the Orioles for Bud Daley on 18 April 1958. He responded with a career-best season, winning 15 games, fifth-most in the American League, losing 11, and finishing tenth in the league in earned run average (3.25). He threw a career-best three shutouts (including back-to-back whitewashings May 30 against Boston and June 3 against Detroit), and from June 29 through July 20 he hurled five consecutive complete game victories. It would be his only winning campaign in the major leagues.

But he got off to a disastrous start in 1959, allowing six earned runs against the New York Yankees in only two innings pitched on April 14, and could not get his earned run average below 9.00 until July 5. By that time, he was still winless in five decisions. He would win only two games all season, losing seven. Then, in 1960—his last year in the major leagues—Portocarrero split the year between Triple-A and the Orioles. In his final appearance in the big leagues June 15, 1960, he allowed five runs in relief to the Cleveland Indians, although only two of them were earned. He retired after the 1961 season.

As a major leaguer, Portocarrero won 38 and lost 57, with an earned run average of 4.32. In 8171/3 innings pitched, he allowed 778 hits and 320 bases on balls. He struck out 338, compiled 33 career complete games, five shutouts and two saves.
