= 1954 Washington Senators season =

1954 Washington Senators
- League: American League
- Ballpark: Griffith Stadium
- City: Washington, D.C.
- Record: 66–88 (.429)
- League place: 6th
- Owners: Clark Griffith (majority owner)
- Managers: Bucky Harris
- Television: WTOP
- Radio: WWDC (FM) (Arch McDonald, Bob Wolff)

The 1954 Washington Senators won 66 games, lost 88, and finished in sixth place in the American League. They were managed by Bucky Harris and played home games at Griffith Stadium.

== Offseason ==
- November 30, 1953: Al Sima was drafted from the Senators by the Chicago White Sox in the 1953 rule 5 draft.
- Prior to 1954 season: José Valdivielso was acquired by the Senators from the Lubbock Hubbers.

== Regular season ==
During the season, Carlos Paula became the first black player in the history of the Senators.

=== Season standings ===
American League
Team	W	L	Pct.	GB	Home	Road
Cleveland Indians	111	43	.721	—	59‍–‍18	52‍–‍25
New York Yankees	103	51	.669	8	54‍–‍23	49‍–‍28
Chicago White Sox	94	60	.610	17	45‍–‍32	49‍–‍28
Boston Red Sox	69	85	.448	42	38‍–‍39	31‍–‍46
Detroit Tigers	68	86	.442	43	35‍–‍42	33‍–‍44
Washington Senators	66	88	.429	45	37‍–‍41	29‍–‍47
Baltimore Orioles	54	100	.351	57	32‍–‍45	22‍–‍55
Philadelphia Athletics	51	103	.331	60	29‍–‍47	22‍–‍56

=== Record vs. opponents ===
1954 American League record Sources:
Team	BAL	BOS	CWS	CLE	DET	NYY	PHA	WSH
Baltimore	—	11–11	7–15	3–19	8–14	5–17	10–12	10–12
Boston	11–11	—	5–17	2–20–2	14–8	9–13	15–7	13–9
Chicago	15–7	17–5	—	11–11	12–10–1	7–15	17–5	15–7
Cleveland	19–3	20–2–2	11–11	—	14–8	11–11	18–4	18–4
Detroit	14–8	8–14	10–12–1	8–14	—	6–16	13–9	9–13
New York	17–5	13–9	15–7	11–11	16–6	—	18–4–1	13–9
Philadelphia	12–10	7–15	5–17	4–18	9–13	4–18–1	—	10–12–1
Washington	12–10	9–13	7–15	4–18	13–9	9–13	12–10–1	—

=== Notable transactions ===
- June 11, 1954: Sonny Dixon was traded by the Senators to the Chicago White Sox for Gus Keriazakos.
- June 18, 1954: Harmon Killebrew was signed as an amateur free agent (bonus baby) by the Senators.
- August 7, 1954: Jim Pearce was purchased from the Senators by the Cincinnati Redlegs.

=== Roster ===
1954 Washington Senators
Roster
Pitchers: 16 Sonny Dixon; 16 Gus Keriazakos; 22 Connie Marrero; 21 Mickey McDermott; 27,62 Camilo Pascual; 19 Bob Porterfield; 31,20 Johnny Schmitz; 17 Spec Shea; 32,24 Bunky Stewart; 18 Chuck Stobbs; 26,49 Dean Stone	Catchers: 8,37 Ed Fitz Gerald; 31 Steve Korcheck; 9 Bob Oldis; 10 Joe Tipton; Infielders: 28 Roy Dietzel; 28 Mel Hoderlein; 25 Harmon Killebrew; 30 Jesse Levan; 11 Johnny Pesky; 5 Pete Runnels; 6 Jerry Snyder; 12 Wayne Terwilliger; 3 Mickey Vernon; 1 Eddie Yost	Outfielders: 7 Jim Busby; 14 Jim Lemon; 23 Carlos Paula; 2 Roy Sievers; 4 Tom Umphlett; 15 Clyde Vollmer; 29 Tom Wright	Manager: 50 Bucky Harris; Coaches: 52 Joe Fitzgerald; 55 Joe Haynes; 51 Heinie Manush; 53 George Myatt

== Player stats ==
=== Batting ===
==== Starters by position ====
Note: Pos = Position; G = Games played; AB = At bats; H = Hits; Avg. = Batting average; HR = Home runs; RBI = Runs batted in

Pos	Player	G	AB	H	Avg.	HR	RBI
C	Ed Fitz Gerald	115	360	104	.289	4	40
1B	Mickey Vernon	151	597	173	.290	20	97
2B	Wayne Terwilliger	106	337	70	.208	3	24
SS	Pete Runnels	139	488	131	.268	3	56
3B	Eddie Yost	155	539	138	.256	11	47
LF	Roy Sievers	145	514	119	.232	24	102
CF	Jim Busby	155	628	187	.298	7	80
RF	Tom Umphlett	114	342	75	.219	1	33

==== Other batters ====
Note: G = Games played; AB = At bats; H = Hits; Avg. = Batting average; HR = Home runs; RBI = Runs batted in

Player	G	AB	H	Avg.	HR	RBI
Tom Wright	76	171	42	.246	1	17
Johnny Pesky	49	158	40	.253	0	9
Joe Tipton	54	157	35	.223	1	10
Jerry Snyder	64	154	36	.234	0	17
Jim Lemon	37	128	30	.234	2	13
Clyde Vollmer	62	117	30	.256	2	15
Mel Hoderlein	14	25	4	.160	0	1
Bob Oldis	11	24	8	.333	0	0
Carlos Paula	9	24	4	.167	0	2
Roy Dietzel	9	21	5	.238	0	1
Harmon Killebrew	9	13	4	.308	0	3
Jesse Levan	7	10	3	.300	0	0
Steve Korcheck	2	7	1	.143	0	0

=== Pitching ===
==== Starting pitchers ====
Note: G = Games pitched; IP = Innings pitched; W = Wins; L = Losses; ERA = Earned run average; SO = Strikeouts

Player	G	IP	W	L	ERA	SO
Bob Porterfield	32	244.0	13	15	3.32	82
Mickey McDermott	30	196.1	7	15	3.44	95
Johnny Schmitz	29	185.1	11	8	2.91	56
Chuck Stobbs	31	182.0	11	11	4.10	67
Dean Stone	31	178.2	12	10	3.22	87

==== Other pitchers ====
Note: G = Games pitched; IP = Innings pitched; W = Wins; L = Losses; ERA = Earned run average; SO = Strikeouts

Player	G	IP	W	L	ERA	SO
Spec Shea	23	71.1	2	9	6.18	22
Connie Marrero	22	66.1	3	6	4.75	26

==== Relief pitchers ====
Note: G = Games pitched; W = Wins; L = Losses; SV = Saves; ERA = Earned run average; SO = Strikeouts

Player	G	W	L	SV	ERA	SO
Camilo Pascual	48	4	7	3	4.22	60
Bunky Stewart	29	0	2	1	7.64	27
Gus Keriazakos	22	2	3	0	3.77	33
Sonny Dixon	16	1	2	1	3.03	7

== Farm system ==
Level	Team	League	Manager
AA	Chattanooga Lookouts	Southern Association	Cal Ermer
A	Charlotte Hornets	Sally League	Pete Appleton and Ellis Clary
B	Hagerstown Packets	Piedmont League	Paul Campbell and Zeke Bonura
B	Rock Hill Chiefs	Tri-State League	Sam Lamitina, Mel Kerestes and Jake Early
C	Wichita Falls/ Sweetwater Spudders	Longhorn League	Red McCarty
D	Orlando C.B.s	Florida State League	Tommy O'Brien
D	Fulton Lookouts	KITTY League	Red Mincy
D	Erie Senators	PONY League	Tom O'Connell, Nap Reyes, Tom Milich and Joe Consoli

Wichita Falls club moved to Sweetwater, May 6, 1954
