= 1954 Detroit Tigers season =

Major League Baseball season

1954 Detroit Tigers
- League: American League
- Ballpark: Briggs Stadium
- City: Detroit, Michigan
- Record: 68–86 (.442)
- League place: 6th
- Owners: Walter Briggs, Jr.
- General managers: Muddy Ruel
- Managers: Fred Hutchinson
- Television: WJBK
- Radio: WKMH (Van Patrick, Dizzy Trout)

The 1954 Detroit Tigers season was a season in American baseball. The team finished fifth in the American League with a record of 68–86, 43 games behind the Cleveland Indians.

== Regular season ==
=== Season standings ===
American League
Team	W	L	Pct.	GB	Home	Road
Cleveland Indians	111	43	.721	—	59‍–‍18	52‍–‍25
New York Yankees	103	51	.669	8	54‍–‍23	49‍–‍28
Chicago White Sox	94	60	.610	17	45‍–‍32	49‍–‍28
Boston Red Sox	69	85	.448	42	38‍–‍39	31‍–‍46
Detroit Tigers	68	86	.442	43	35‍–‍42	33‍–‍44
Washington Senators	66	88	.429	45	37‍–‍41	29‍–‍47
Baltimore Orioles	54	100	.351	57	32‍–‍45	22‍–‍55
Philadelphia Athletics	51	103	.331	60	29‍–‍47	22‍–‍56

=== Record vs. opponents ===
1954 American League record Sources:
Team	BAL	BOS	CWS	CLE	DET	NYY	PHA	WSH
Baltimore	—	11–11	7–15	3–19	8–14	5–17	10–12	10–12
Boston	11–11	—	5–17	2–20–2	14–8	9–13	15–7	13–9
Chicago	15–7	17–5	—	11–11	12–10–1	7–15	17–5	15–7
Cleveland	19–3	20–2–2	11–11	—	14–8	11–11	18–4	18–4
Detroit	14–8	8–14	10–12–1	8–14	—	6–16	13–9	9–13
New York	17–5	13–9	15–7	11–11	16–6	—	18–4–1	13–9
Philadelphia	12–10	7–15	5–17	4–18	9–13	4–18–1	—	10–12–1
Washington	12–10	9–13	7–15	4–18	13–9	9–13	12–10–1	—

=== Notable transactions ===
- August 20, 1954: Earl Harrist and cash were traded by the Tigers to the Seattle Rainiers for Van Fletcher.

=== Roster ===
1954 Detroit Tigers
Roster
Pitchers: 22 Al Aber; 35 Ralph Branca; 49 Dick Donovan; 31 Ned Garver; 34 Ted Gray; 18 Steve Gromek; 20 Ray Herbert; 44 Billy Hoeft; 30 Frank Lary; 37 Dick Marlowe; 28 Bob Miller; 21,30 Dick Weik; 38 George Zuverink	Catchers: 10 Matt Batts; 2 Frank House; 14,50 Al Lakeman; 19 Walt Streuli; 10 Red Wilson; Infielders: 4 Wayne Belardi; 16 Reno Bertoia; 15,40 Frank Bolling; 8 Ray Boone; 50 George Bullard; 3 Walt Dropo; 1 Fred Hatfield; 4,38 Chuck Kress; 26 Harvey Kuenn	Outfielders: 24 Jim Delsing; 14 Hoot Evers; 6 Al Kaline; 21 Chick King; 21,30 Don Lund; 5 Bob Nieman; 12 Steve Souchock; 17 Bill Tuttle; Other batters: 7 Johnny Pesky	Manager: 29 Fred Hutchinson; Coaches: 36 Johnny Hopp; 33 Schoolboy Rowe; 9 Bob Swift

== Player stats ==
= Indicates team leader

= Indicates league leader

=== Batting ===
==== Starters by position ====
Note: Pos = Position; G = Games played; AB = At bats; H = Hits; Avg. = Batting average; HR = Home runs; RBI = Runs batted in

Pos	Player	G	AB	H	Avg.	HR	RBI
C	Frank House	114	352	88	.250	9	38
1B	Walt Dropo	107	320	90	.281	4	44
2B	Frank Bolling	117	368	87	.236	6	38
SS	Harvey Kuenn	155	656	201	.306	5	48
3B	Ray Boone	148	543	160	.295	20	85
LF	Jim Delsing	122	371	92	.248	6	38
CF	Bill Tuttle	147	530	141	.266	7	58
RF	Al Kaline	138	504	139	.276	4	43

==== Other batters ====
Note: G = Games played; AB = At bats; H = Hits; Avg. = Batting average; HR = Home runs; RBI = Runs batted in

Player	G	AB	H	Avg.	HR	RBI
Bob Nieman	91	251	66	.263	8	35
Wayne Belardi	88	250	58	.232	11	24
Fred Hatfield	81	218	64	.294	2	25
Red Wilson	54	170	48	.282	2	22
Hoot Evers	30	60	11	.183	0	5
Don Lund	35	54	7	.130	0	3
Bud Souchock	25	39	7	.179	3	8
Reno Bertoia	54	37	6	.162	1	2
Chuck Kress	24	37	7	.189	0	3
Chick King	11	28	6	.214	0	3
Matt Batts	12	21	6	.286	0	5
Johnny Pesky	20	17	3	.176	1	1
Al Lakeman	5	6	0	.000	0	0
George Bullard	4	1	0	.000	0	0
Walt Streuli	1	0	0	----	0	0

=== Pitching ===
==== Starting pitchers ====
Note: G = Games pitched; IP = Innings pitched; W = Wins; L = Losses; ERA = Earned run average; SO = Strikeouts

Player	G	IP	W	L	ERA	SO
Steve Gromek	36	252.2	18	16	2.74	102
Ned Garver	35	246.1	14	11	2.81	93
George Zuverink	35	203.0	9	13	3.59	70
Billy Hoeft	34	175.0	7	15	4.58	114

==== Other pitchers ====
Note: G = Games pitched; IP = Innings pitched; W = Wins; L = Losses; ERA = Earned run average; SO = Strikeouts

Player	G	IP	W	L	ERA	SO
Al Aber	32	124.2	5	11	3.97	54
Ted Gray	19	72.0	3	5	5.38	29
Ralph Branca	17	45.1	3	3	5.76	15
Dick Weik	9	16.1	0	1	7.16	9

==== Relief pitchers ====
Note: G = Games pitched; W = Wins; L = Losses; SV = Saves; ERA = Earned run average; SO = Strikeouts

Player	G	W	L	SV	ERA	SO
Dick Marlowe	38	5	4	2	4.18	39
Ray Herbert	42	3	6	0	5.87	44
Bob Miller	32	1	1	1	2.45	27
Frank Lary	3	0	0	0	2.45	5
Dick Donovan	2	0	0	0	10.50	2

== Farm system ==
Level	Team	League	Manager
AAA	Buffalo Bisons	International League	Billy Hitchcock
AA	Little Rock Travelers	Southern Association	Bill Norman, Stubby Overmire and Pat Mullin
A	Wilkes-Barre Barons	Eastern League	Dan Carnevale
B	Durham Bulls	Carolina League	Charlie Metro
C	Greenville Tigers	Cotton States League	Willis Hudlin
C	Idaho Falls Russets	Pioneer League	Bob Mavis
D	Valdosta Tigers	Georgia–Florida League	Marv Owen and Stan Wasiak
D	Jamestown Falcons	PONY League	Danny Litwhiler and Wayne Blackburn
