= Bill Lobe =

American baseball player, coach, and scout

- Coach
- Born: March 4, 1912; Cleveland, Ohio, U.S.
- Died: January 7, 1969 (aged 56); Cleveland, U.S.
- Batted: Right Threw: Right

Teams
- Cleveland Indians (1951–1959)

William Charles Lobe (March 4, 1912 — January 7, 1969) was an American professional baseball catcher and coach. He was a native and lifelong resident of Cleveland, Ohio.

Lobe was 27 years of age when he broke into professional baseball. He spent three seasons (1939–1941) at the lowest level of minor league baseball as a catcher in the farm systems of the Cleveland Indians and Chicago Cubs, batting .199 in 143 games. Lobe threw and batted right-handed, stood 5 feet 9 1/2 inches (1.765 m) tall and weighed 178 pounds (81 kg).

After service in World War II, Lobe joined his hometown Indians as the Major League Baseball team's bullpen and batting practice catcher (1946–1950) and then full-time bullpen coach (1951–1959), working under managers Lou Boudreau, Al López, Kerby Farrell, Bobby Bragan and Joe Gordon.

Lobe was a member of the Indians' 1954 American League championship team. He died at age 56 in Cleveland.
