= Bill Garcia =

American broadcaster

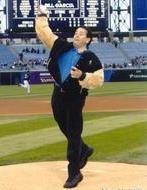

Bill Garcia is an American broadcaster and a veteran of many major market radio stations in Houston, Charlotte, Cleveland and Chicago. He was one of the first Hispanic personalities to cross over into mainstream radio in major market and consistently achieved top five rankings. He has worked at many Chicago radio stations including a stint at WLS as a talk-show host, WJMK, and WFYR. He was awarded Midday Personality of the Year at the 2000 Achievement in Radio (AIR) Awards.

Garcia was born in Bryan, Texas just outside Houston, and began his radio career in his junior year of High School. He hosted his first request show on "Teen Time" on KORA-AM. The owners of KORA asked him to stay on after High School and remained there to support his way through college. He went on to later become the Program Director and Operations Manager at KORA-AM.

He later worked at KULF (CHR) in Houston, where he had an on-air shift. While working the afternoon drive position at Big WAYS(WAYS)in Charlotte NC, he met WAYS morning personality Robert Murphy, a.k.a. "Murphy in the Morning" who later went to Chicago and did mornings at WKQX-FM.

Garcia then accepted the offer of General Manager at the cross town station, WDEX. While at WDEX, a Nationwide search was formed to replace popular morning DJ, Gary Dee at Cleveland Ohio's WHK. He was offered this position and moved to Cleveland where he performed morning show duties. WHK was where he hired Dan O'Shannon as his show producer, and where he got his first stint in country music. Dan O'Shannon went on to become Producer and Executive Producer of the TV shows "Cheers" and "Frasier". O'Shannon later contacted Garcia thanking him for helping him get his first start in the entertainment business. O'Shannon has won 3 Primetime Emmys and is currently executive producer of "Modern Family" TV show.

"The Bill Garcia" show drew the attention of Chicago country music station US99's General Manager Drew Horowitz who flew to Cleveland where he invited Garcia to be his afternoon drive personality. Garcia was on afternoons at US99 until a change in ownership led him to music station WLS in Chicago. Shortly after his arrival, WLS switched from music and he became one of the first talk show hosts at the new talk station.

An offer from WFYR moved Garcia back to music, at that time one of Chicago's oldies station. He also worked at Chicago's Magic 104(WJMK). While there, another offer from US99 brought him back to playing country music in Chicago. It was at US99 where he was consistently in the top ten and achieved number one ratings for his show.

One of his biggest moments was when he was invited by the Chicago White Sox to throw out the 1st Pitch at a White Sox home game. Mark Buehrle was his catcher for the evening and the starting pitcher for that game. Garcia is currently involved in commercial voice over work in Chicago. He is the voice of Cricket cellular. He has done many Radio and TV commercials including an award that he points with pride as being the most recognized and amusing commercial for a Chicago insurance company Eagle Insurance which was featured on the David Letterman Show, Soup, in E!'s special called Wildest TV Commercial Moments. Also it appeared in a BBC special on American Advertising. In 2010 it was featured in "The Smoking Gun Presents World's Dumbest Performers" Special on Tru TV network. Garcia currently voices commercials for many well known advertisers such as Sears, Blockbuster and others. Garcia and his wife Anita have been actively involved in many charities including the "largest line dance" during a Chicago Bulls halftime show for the American Lung Association in which the entire basketball court was filled with Country line dancers. Garcia also is active with St. Jude's Children's Hospital and has hosted its prestigious St. Jude's Fashion Show which attracts thousands of Chicago's fashionistas.

Bill is now part of Chicago Radio Online and a large lineup of Chicago radio stars such as Tommy Edwards, Fred Winston, Scotty Brink, Steve Cochran, Mitch Michaels, Danae Alexander, Doug Dahlgren, Clark Weber. John Gehron former General Manager of Oprah Radio and who helped establish Oprah Winfrey's "Oprah & Friends" on XM Radio is current COO of ChicagoRadioOnline.
