= Tom Hurd (baseball) =

American baseball player (1924–1982)

- Pitcher
- Born: May 27, 1924; Danville, Virginia, U.S.
- Died: September 5, 1982 (aged 58); Waterloo, Iowa, U.S.
- Batted: Right Threw: Right

MLB debut
- July 30, 1954, for the Boston Red Sox

Last MLB appearance
- September 29, 1956, for the Boston Red Sox

MLB statistics
- Win–loss record: 13–10
- Earned run average: 3.96
- Strikeouts: 96
- Stats at Baseball Reference

Teams
- Boston Red Sox (1954–1956)

Thomas Carr Hurd (May 27, 1924 – September 5, 1982) was an American professional baseball player, a middle-relief pitcher who appeared 99 games in Major League Baseball between 1954 and 1956 for the Boston Red Sox. Listed at 5 feet 9 inches (1.75 m) tall and 155 pounds (70 kg), Hurd batted and threw right-handed. He was born in Danville, Virginia. He served in the United States Army during World War II.

== Career ==
Hurd's pro career lasted for 14 seasons (1946–49; 1951–60). It began as a shortstop in the Chicago White Sox' system, where he converted to pitching in 1948, and ended in the St. Louis Cardinals' organization. His tenure with the Red Sox began in July 1954 when, at age 30, he was purchased from the ChiSox' Charleston Senators Triple-A affiliate. He appeared in 16 games for Boston in his rookie season, then spent both 1955 and 1956 on the Red Sox' roster, working in 43 and 40 games. In 1956, Hurd's earned run average ballooned from 3.01 to 5.33. He would spend the rest of his pitching career in the minor league.

In his three-season major-league career, Hurd posted a 13–10 record with a 3.96 ERA and 11 saves, allowing 177 hits and 97 bases on balls, with 96 strikeouts, in 1861/3 innings of work. He enjoyed success in 1958 as the ace relief pitcher for the American Association and Junior World Series champion Minneapolis Millers. Pitching for manager Gene Mauch, Hurd posted a 1.65 earned run average in 52 games.

== Family ==
Hurd was married to Peggy Wilson for 34 years and they had five children.

== Death ==
Hurd died from cancer in Waterloo, Iowa, at age 58.

== Sources ==
- Career statistics from Baseball Reference · Retrosheet · Baseball Almanac
- Retrosheet
