= 1954 New York Yankees season =

Season for the Major League Baseball team the New York Yankees

1954 New York Yankees
- League: American League
- Ballpark: Yankee Stadium
- City: New York City
- Record: 103–51 (.669)
- League place: 2nd
- Owners: Dan Topping and Del Webb
- General managers: George Weiss
- Managers: Casey Stengel
- Television: WPIX
- Radio: WINS (AM) (Mel Allen, Jim Woods, Red Barber)

The 1954 New York Yankees season was the team's 52nd season. Having won an unprecedented fifth consecutive World Series title the previous year, the team came up short in its bid for a sixth straight world championship as their 103–51 record (the team's best finish in the Stengel era) was only good enough for in second place in the American League. New York finished eight games behind the Cleveland Indians, who broke the Yankees' 1927 AL record by winning 111 games. New York was managed by Casey Stengel. The Yankees played their home games at Yankee Stadium.

== Offseason ==
- November 19, 1953: Ralph Terry was signed as an amateur free agent by the New York Yankees.

== Regular season ==
Bob Grim became the first rookie pitcher to win 20 games in one season but pitch less than 200 innings in the same season.

=== Season standings ===
American League
Team	W	L	Pct.	GB	Home	Road
Cleveland Indians	111	43	.721	—	59‍–‍18	52‍–‍25
New York Yankees	103	51	.669	8	54‍–‍23	49‍–‍28
Chicago White Sox	94	60	.610	17	45‍–‍32	49‍–‍28
Boston Red Sox	69	85	.448	42	38‍–‍39	31‍–‍46
Detroit Tigers	68	86	.442	43	35‍–‍42	33‍–‍44
Washington Senators	66	88	.429	45	37‍–‍41	29‍–‍47
Baltimore Orioles	54	100	.351	57	32‍–‍45	22‍–‍55
Philadelphia Athletics	51	103	.331	60	29‍–‍47	22‍–‍56

=== Record vs. opponents ===
1954 American League record Sources:
Team	BAL	BOS	CWS	CLE	DET	NYY	PHA	WSH
Baltimore	—	11–11	7–15	3–19	8–14	5–17	10–12	10–12
Boston	11–11	—	5–17	2–20–2	14–8	9–13	15–7	13–9
Chicago	15–7	17–5	—	11–11	12–10–1	7–15	17–5	15–7
Cleveland	19–3	20–2–2	11–11	—	14–8	11–11	18–4	18–4
Detroit	14–8	8–14	10–12–1	8–14	—	6–16	13–9	9–13
New York	17–5	13–9	15–7	11–11	16–6	—	18–4–1	13–9
Philadelphia	12–10	7–15	5–17	4–18	9–13	4–18–1	—	10–12–1
Washington	12–10	9–13	7–15	4–18	13–9	9–13	12–10–1	—

=== Notable transactions ===
- April 11, 1954: Bill Virdon, Mel Wright, and Emil Tellinger (minors) were traded by the Yankees to the St. Louis Cardinals for Enos Slaughter.
- May 11, 1954: Jim Brideweser was traded by the Yankees to the Baltimore Orioles for Neil Berry, Dick Kokos and Jim Post (minors).

=== Roster ===
1954 New York Yankees
Roster
Pitchers: 24 Ralph Branca; 19 Harry Byrd; 28 Tommy Byrne; 16 Whitey Ford; 24 Tom Gorman; 55 Bob Grim; 21 Jim Konstanty; 21 Bob Kuzava; 30 Eddie Lopat; 18 Jim McDonald; 23 Bill Miller; 28 Tom Morgan; 22 Allie Reynolds; 11 Johnny Sain; 38 Art Schallock; 27 Marlin Stuart; 39 Bob Wiesler	Catchers: 49 Lou Berberet; 8 Yogi Berra; 29 Charlie Silvera; 26 Gus Triandos; Infielders: 27 Bobby Brown; 6 Andy Carey; 42 Jerry Coleman; 15 Joe Collins; 27 Woodie Held; 51 Frank Leja; 12 Gil McDougald; 20 Willy Miranda; 10 Phil Rizzuto; 36 Eddie Robinson; 53 Bill Skowron	Outfielders: 9 Hank Bauer; 41 Bob Cerv; 7 Mickey Mantle; 25 Irv Noren; 17 Enos Slaughter; 14 Gene Woodling; Other batters: 32 Ralph Houk	Manager: 37 Casey Stengel; Coaches: 2 Frankie Crosetti; 33 Bill Dickey; 32 Ralph Houk; 31 Jim Turner

== Player stats ==
= Indicates team leader

= Indicates league leader

=== Batting ===
==== Starters by position ====
Note: Pos = Position; G = Games played; AB = At bats; H = Hits; Avg. = Batting average; HR = Home runs; RBI = Runs batted in

Pos	Player	G	AB	H	Avg.	HR	RBI
C	Yogi Berra	151	584	179	.307	22	125
1B	Joe Collins	130	343	93	.271	12	46
2B	Gil McDougald	126	394	102	.259	12	48
SS	Phil Rizzuto	127	307	60	.195	2	15
3B	Andy Carey	122	411	124	.302	8	65
LF	Gene Woodling	97	304	76	.250	3	40
CF	Mickey Mantle	146	543	163	.300	27	102
RF	Hank Bauer	114	377	111	.294	12	54

==== Other batters ====
Note: G = Games played; AB = At bats; H = Hits; Avg. = Batting average; HR = Home runs; RBI = Runs batted in

Player	G	AB	H	Avg.	HR	RBI
Irv Noren	125	426	136	.319	12	66
Jerry Coleman	107	300	65	.217	3	21
Bill Skowron	87	215	73	.340	7	41
Eddie Robinson	85	142	37	.261	3	27
Enos Slaughter	69	125	31	.248	1	19
Willy Miranda	92	116	29	.250	1	12
Bob Cerv	56	100	26	.260	5	13
Bobby Brown	28	60	13	.217	1	7
Charlie Silvera	20	37	10	.270	0	4
Lou Berberet	5	5	2	.400	0	3
Frank Leja	12	5	1	.200	0	0
Woodie Held	4	3	0	.000	0	0
Ralph Houk	1	1	0	.000	0	0
Gus Triandos	2	1	0	.000	0	0

=== Pitching ===
==== Starting pitchers ====
Note: G = Games pitched; IP = Innings pitched; W = Wins; L = Losses; ERA = Earned run average; SO = Strikeouts

Player	G	IP	W	L	ERA	SO
Whitey Ford	34	210.2	16	8	2.82	125
Eddie Lopat	26	170.0	12	4	3.55	54
Harry Byrd	25	132.0	9	7	2.99	52
Tommy Byrne	5	40.0	3	2	2.70	24

==== Other pitchers ====
Note: G = Games pitched; IP = Innings pitched; W = Wins; L = Losses; ERA = Earned run average; SO = Strikeouts

Player	G	IP	W	L	ERA	SO
Bob Grim	37	199.0	20	6	3.26	108
Allie Reynolds	36	157.1	13	4	3.32	100
Tom Morgan	32	143.0	11	5	3.34	34
Jim McDonald	16	71.0	4	1	3.17	20
Bob Wiesler	6	30.1	3	2	4.15	25
Ralph Branca	5	12.2	1	0	2.84	7
Bill Miller	2	5.2	0	1	6.35	6

==== Relief pitchers ====
Note: G = Games pitched; W = Wins; L = Losses; SV = Saves; ERA = Earned run average; SO = Strikeouts

Player	G	W	L	SV	ERA	SO
Johnny Sain	45	6	6	26	3.16	33
Tom Gorman	23	0	0	3	2.21	31
Bob Kuzava	20	1	3	1	5.45	22
Marlin Stuart	10	3	0	1	5.40	2
Jim Konstanty	9	1	1	2	0.98	3
Art Schallock	6	0	1	0	4.15	9

== Awards and honors ==
- Yogi Berra, American League MVP

All-Star Game

- Hank Bauer - Starter
- Yogi Berra - Starter
- Whitey Ford - Starter
- Mickey Mantle - Starter

== Farm system ==
Level	Team	League	Manager
AAA	Kansas City Blues	American Association	Harry Craft
AA	Birmingham Barons	Southern Association	Mayo Smith
A	Binghamton Triplets	Eastern League	Phil Page
B	Quincy Gems	Illinois–Indiana–Iowa League	Vern Hoscheit
B	Norfolk Tars	Piedmont League	Skeeter Scalzi
C	Modesto Reds	California League	Jack Graham and Jerry Crosby
C	St. Joseph Saints	Western Association	Bill Cope
D	Bristol Twins	Appalachian League	Walter Lance
D	Owensboro Oilers	KITTY League	Marvin Crater
D	McAlester Rockets	Sooner State League	Bunny Mick

LEAGUE CHAMPIONS: Quincy, Modesto
