= Tom Herrin =

American baseball player (1929–1999)

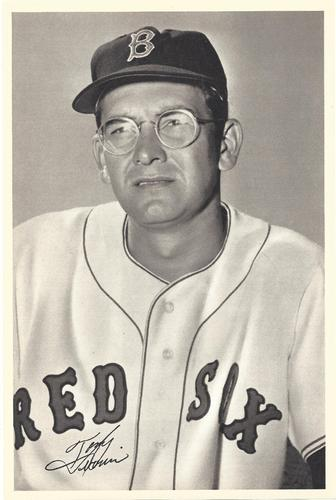
- Pitcher
- Born: September 12, 1929; Shreveport, Louisiana, U.S.
- Died: November 29, 1999 (aged 70); Homer, Louisiana, U.S.
- Batted: Right Threw: Right

MLB debut
- April 13, 1954, for the Boston Red Sox

Last MLB appearance
- June 20, 1954, for the Boston Red Sox

MLB statistics
- Win–loss record: 1–2
- Earned run average: 7.31
- Strikeouts: 8
- Stats at Baseball Reference

Teams
- Boston Red Sox (1954)

Thomas Edward Herrin (September 12, 1929 – November 29, 1999) was an American relief pitcher in Major League Baseball who played briefly for the Boston Red Sox during the 1954 season. He played college baseball and basketball at Louisiana Tech University. Listed at 6 ft 3 in (1.91 m), 190 lb., Herrin batted and threw right-handed. He was born in Shreveport, Louisiana.

Herrin posted a 1–2 record with a 7.31 ERA in 14 appearances, including eight strikeouts, 22 walks, and 28⅓ innings of work. He was not credited with a save.

Herrin died in Homer, Louisiana, at age 70.

== Sources ==
- Baseball Reference
