= Bob Hooper =

Canadian baseball player (1922–1980)

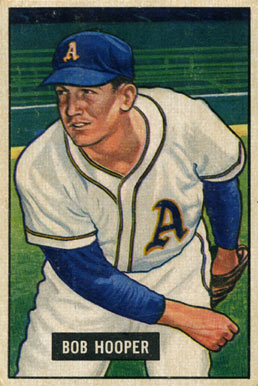
- Pitcher
- Born: May 30, 1922; Leamington, Ontario Canada
- Died: March 17, 1980 (aged 57); New Brunswick, New Jersey, U.S.
- Batted: Right Threw: Right

MLB debut
- April 19, 1950, for the Philadelphia Athletics

Last MLB appearance
- May 14, 1955, for the Cincinnati Redlegs

MLB statistics
- Win–loss record: 40–41
- Earned run average: 4.80
- Strikeouts: 196
- Stats at Baseball Reference

Teams
- Philadelphia Athletics (1950–1952); Cleveland Indians (1953–1954); Cincinnati Redlegs (1955)

Robert Nelson Hooper (May 30, 1922 – March 17, 1980) was a Canadian-born pitcher in Major League Baseball from 1950 to 1955. A native of Leamington, Ontario, Hooper attended Montclair State University in New Jersey and served in the United States Army Air Forces during World War II before his major-league career. As a player, he threw and batted right-handed, stood 5 ft 11 in (180 cm) tall and weighed 195 pounds (88 kg).

Although he was originally signed by the New York Giants, Hooper came to the majors with the 1950 Philadelphia Athletics and promptly won 15 games while losing only 10 for a last-place outfit that won only 52 games all year — Hooper thus accounting for 28.8 percent of all wins for the 1950 A's. In 1951, he won 12 of 22 decisions for a Philadelphia club that improved to 70 victories. Continuing his "against the grain" career, in 1952, with the A's putting up what would be their final over-.500 season in their Philadelphia history, Hooper won only eight games, losing 15. He was traded to the pennant-contending Cleveland Indians that December 19, and became strictly a relief pitcher, appearing in 43 games in 1953 and only 17 contests in 1954. Hooper did not appear in the 1954 World Series, which Cleveland lost to the Giants in a four-game sweep. In his final season, Hooper appeared briefly with the 1955 Cincinnati Redlegs and lost his only two decisions. He finished his career with 40 victories, 41 defeats, 25 saves and an earned run average of 4.80. In 6202/3 innings pitched, he allowed 640 hits and 240 bases on balls, with 196 strikeouts.

Although only posting a career .166 batting average (31-for-187) Hooper hit four home runs. Defensively, he recorded a .970 fielding percentage which was 14 points higher than the league average at his position.

After Hooper retired as a player, he joined the Baltimore Orioles. That reunited him with general manager and field manager Paul Richards, who tutored Hooper on the 1949 Buffalo Bisons of the AAA International League, where Hooper posted a 19–3 record and proved himself ready for the major leagues. Hooper managed Oriole farm teams in the low minors from 1957 to 1960. He was a scout for the New York Mets in the early 1960s, and became a physical education teacher in the New Brunswick, New Jersey, public schools, retiring in 1979. Hooper died of a heart attack at age 57 the following year in New Brunswick.
