= Don Bollweg =

American baseball player (1921–1996)

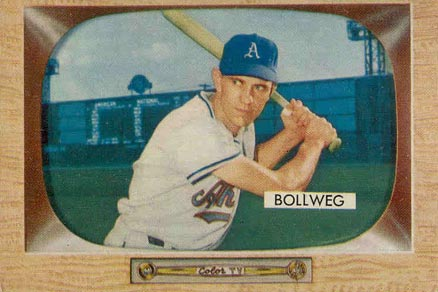
- First baseman
- Born: February 12, 1921; Wheaton, Illinois, U.S.
- Died: May 26, 1996 (aged 75); Wheaton, Illinois, U.S.
- Batted: Left Threw: Left

MLB debut
- September 28, 1950, for the St. Louis Cardinals

Last MLB appearance
- May 10, 1955, for the Kansas City Athletics

MLB statistics
- Batting average: .243
- Home runs: 11
- Runs batted in: 53
- Stats at Baseball Reference

Teams
- St. Louis Cardinals (1950–1951); New York Yankees (1953); Philadelphia/Kansas City Athletics (1954–1955)

Career highlights and awards
- World Series champion (1953)

Donald Raymond Bollweg (February 12, 1921 – May 26, 1996) was an American professional baseball player who appeared in 195 games in Major League Baseball as a first baseman and pinch hitter for three teams between 1950 and 1955. Born in Wheaton, Illinois, Bollweg threw and batted left-handed; he stood 6 feet 1 inch (1.85 m) tall and weighed 190 pounds (86 kg).

== Early career ==
He signed his first pro contract with the St. Louis Cardinals in 1942, which he spent at the Class D level of the minor leagues, then served in the United States Army and U.S. Army Air Force during World War II. He resumed his playing career in 1946, spending two seasons at Double-A Houston and one at Triple-A Rochester before finally making his MLB debut at age 29 in September 1950. Bollweg appeared in only ten total games for the Cardinals during autumn 1950 and spring 1951, when big-league rosters were expanded to 40 and 28 men, respectively.

On May 14, 1951, as they faced the annual roster cutdown to 25 players, the Redbirds dealt Bollweg to the New York Yankees, who sent him to the Kansas City Blues of the American Association. He batted over .300 in both 1951 and 1952, and in the latter year was selected the Association's MVP.

== Major league service ==
That stellar Triple-A performance set the table for Bollweg's successful 1953 season as a reserve first baseman and pinch hitter for a Yankees team that captured its fifth consecutive American League pennant and World Series title. He appeared in 70 AL games, with 34 starts at first base, and collected 46 hits and 21 bases on balls in 178 plate appearances, batting .297 with six home runs. In the 1953 Series, won in six games against the Brooklyn Dodgers, he was used as a pinch hitter in Games 3 and 4, striking out both times, and as a defensive replacement for Johnny Mize in the ninth inning of clinching Game 6.

In December 1953, Bollweg was traded to the Philadelphia Athletics in an 11-player deal, and he shared playing time at first base in 1954 with right-handed-swinging Lou Limmer. After that season, the Athletics moved to Kansas City, site of Bollweg's finest years in Triple-A, in 1955. He singled and drove in two runs as a pinch hitter in the club's first-ever home game at Municipal Stadium, but it was his only safety in nine at bats for the relocated franchise.

After a final pinch hitting assignment against the Baltimore Orioles on May 10, 1955, Bollweg was sent to the minor leagues, again a cutdown-date casualty. He played for four high-level clubs in 1955–1956, then retired from pro baseball after playing a dozen seasons spanning 15 years.

Bollweg ended his major-league career with a batting average of .243, with 110 hits, 22 doubles, seven triples, 11 homers, and 53 runs batted in in 195 games.

After baseball, he returned to Illinois, working largely in real estate and insurance. He died in Wheaton at age 75 in 1996, three years after suffering a stroke.
