= Jim Finigan =

American baseball player (1928–1981)

- Third baseman / Second baseman
- Born: August 19, 1928; Quincy, Illinois, U.S.
- Died: May 16, 1981 (aged 52); Quincy, Illinois, U.S.
- Batted: Right Threw: Right

MLB debut
- April 25, 1954, for the Philadelphia Athletics

Last MLB appearance
- July 5, 1959, for the Baltimore Orioles

MLB statistics
- Batting average: .264
- Home runs: 19
- Runs batted in: 168
- Stats at Baseball Reference

Teams
- Philadelphia / Kansas City Athletics (1954–1956); Detroit Tigers (1957); San Francisco Giants (1958); Baltimore Orioles (1959)

Career highlights and awards
- 2× All-Star (1954, 1955)

James Leroy Finigan (August 19, 1928 – May 16, 1981) was an American professional baseball player who was an infielder in Major League (MLB). Primarily a third baseman and second baseman, he played for the Philadelphia / Kansas City Athletics (1954–1956), Detroit Tigers (1957), San Francisco Giants (1958) and Baltimore Orioles (1959). He threw and batted right-handed, stood 5 feet 11 inches (1.80 m) tall and weighed 175 pounds (79 kg).

Finigan was a native of Quincy, Illinois, who attended Quincy University and Saint Ambrose University. He broke into pro baseball in the New York Yankees' organization in 1948. After four seasons in the Yankee system, and two years performing Korean War military service, he was traded to Philadelphia in an 11-player deal that featured Vic Power on December 16, 1953. Finigan made his major league debut on April 25, 1954 against the Yankees at Connie Mack Stadium, and went on to have a successful rookie season as the A's regular third baseman. He hit .302 in 136 games with 7 home runs, 51 runs batted in, a .421 slugging percentage, and finished second to the Yankees' Bob Grim in the American League Rookie of the Year voting. He also was a member of the American League All-Star team.

In 1955, now playing in Kansas City, Finigan split time between second base and third base and was again named to the All-Star squad. His batting average dropped but his run production increased. In 150 games he hit .255 with 9 home runs and 68 RBI. He also scored 15 more runs than the previous year.

His playing time decreased over the next four years, and his days as a regular player were over. His final game in the big leagues was played on July 5, 1959 with Baltimore. His professional career included all or part of 14 seasons.

Career totals include 512 games played, 422 hits, 19 home runs, 168 runs batted in, 195 runs scored, a .264 batting average, and an on-base percentage of .342.

Finigan died from a heart attack in Quincy at the age of 52.
