= Dutch Romberger =

American baseball player (1927-1983)

- Pitcher
- Born: May 26, 1927; Klingerstown, Pennsylvania, U.S.
- Died: May 26, 1983 (aged 56); Weikert, Pennsylvania, U.S.
- Batted: Right Threw: Right

MLB debut
- May 31, 1954, for the Philadelphia Athletics

Last MLB appearance
- August 1, 1954, for the Philadelphia Athletics

MLB statistics
- Win–loss record: 1–1
- Earned run average: 11.49
- Strikeouts: 6
- Innings pitched: 122/3
- Stats at Baseball Reference

Teams
- Philadelphia Athletics (1954)

Allen Isaiah "Dutch" Romberger (May 26, 1927 – May 26, 1983) was an American professional baseball player. The right-handed pitcher had a 13-season career (1948–59; 1961) in minor league baseball, but made only ten appearances in the Major Leagues for the 1954 Philadelphia Athletics. He was listed as 6 feet (1.83 m) tall and 185 pounds (84 kg).

A native of Klingerstown, Pennsylvania, Romberger signed with the Athletics in 1948. He split 1954, his seventh pro season, between the Triple-A Ottawa Athletics and the big-league squad, playing its 54th and last season in Philadelphia. All of his ten appearances came in relief, and he was ineffective, allowing 28 hits, three home runs and 12 bases on balls in 122/3 innings pitched, with six strikeouts. However, he earned his only MLB victory on June 19 at Briggs Stadium. Called into the game in the seventh inning with Philadelphia trailing 4–0, Romberger set down the Detroit Tigers in order. Then, in the top of the eighth, the Athletics tallied five runs and came away with a 5–4 win.

Romberger was a successful minor league pitcher, compiling a 111–72 win-loss record (.607) in 462 games, all but 23 of them for the Athletics' organization.

He died on his 56th birthday in Weikert, Pennsylvania.
