= Bill Upton =

American baseball player (1929-1987)

- Pitcher
- Born: June 18, 1929; Esther, Missouri, U.S.
- Died: January 2, 1987 (aged 57); San Diego, California, U.S.
- Batted: Right Threw: Right

MLB debut
- April 13, 1954, for the Philadelphia Athletics

Last MLB appearance
- May 3, 1954, for the Philadelphia Athletics

MLB statistics
- Win–loss record: 0-0
- Earned run average: 1.80
- Strikeouts: 2
- Stats at Baseball Reference

Teams
- Philadelphia Athletics (1954)

William Ray Upton (June 18, 1929 – January 2, 1987) was an American Major League Baseball pitcher who made two relief appearances in 1954 with the Philadelphia Athletics. He batted and threw right-handed.

Upton had no decision in either of his appearances, with a 1.80 ERA, allowing one earned run in five innings pitched.

He was born in Esther, Missouri and died in San Diego, California. His brother Tom played in the big leagues from 1950 to 1952.
