= Johnny Gray (baseball) =

American baseball player (1926–2014)

- Pitcher
- Born: December 11, 1926; West Palm Beach, Florida, U.S.
- Died: May 21, 2014 (aged 87); Boca Raton, Florida, U.S.
- Batted: Right Threw: Right

MLB debut
- July 18, 1954, for the Philadelphia Athletics

Last MLB appearance
- July 16, 1958, for the Philadelphia Phillies

MLB statistics
- Win–loss record: 4–18
- Earned run average: 6.18
- Strikeouts: 75
- Stats at Baseball Reference

Teams
- Philadelphia Athletics / Kansas City Athletics (1954–1955); Cleveland Indians (1957); Philadelphia Phillies (1958)

John Leonard Gray (December 11, 1926 – May 21, 2014) was an American professional baseball pitcher, who played in Major League Baseball (MLB) for the Philadelphia Athletics / Kansas City Athletics, Cleveland Indians, and Philadelphia Phillies in all or part of four baseball seasons (1954–55; 1957–58). Listed at 6 ft 4 in (1.93 m), 226 lb (103 kg), he batted and threw right handed.

Gray, who was born in West Palm Beach, Florida, was a graduate of Rollins College in Winter Park, Florida, where he starred for the school's baseball team. He served for the United States Army in the Mediterranean Theater of Operations during World War II.

Gray was originally signed by the New York Yankees as an amateur free agent in 1950. He spent four years in their minor league system, sporting a record of 44–39 and a 2.28 earned run average (ERA) in 745 pitching appearances before being traded to the Athletics in December 1953.

Gray played for the Athletics both in their final season in Philadelphia and their first season in Kansas City. He posted a 3–15 record and a 7.25 ERA in his two stints for the team before joining the Indians in 1957 and the Phillies in 1958. On July 30, 1957, he hurled a three-hit shutout against the Baltimore Orioles at Memorial Stadium in Baltimore.

In a four-season career, Gray went 4–18 with a 6.18 ERA in 48 games, including 24 starts, allowing 132 earned runs on 172 hits and 142 walks while striking out 75 in 169 innings of work.

Gray would spend 11 seasons in the minors while playing for 13 clubs between 1950 and 1960. He collected a 71–75 record and a 3.33 ERA in 275 games, which included five seasons with at least 10 victories and the best ERA in the American Association at 2.72 during the 1956 season.

Following his baseball retirement, Gray worked as an apartment complex manager in Miami, Florida, and was a long-term Palm Beach County resident. At this time, he gained induction into the Rollins College Hall of Fame as part of its 1979 Class.

On May 21, 2014, Gray died in Boca Raton, Florida at the age of 87. He was buried at the South Florida National Cemetery in Lake Worth, Florida with military honors being provided by the US Army Funeral Honor Guard.
