= Lou Limmer =

American baseball player (1925–2007)

- First baseman
- Born: March 10, 1925; New York City, New York, U.S.
- Died: April 1, 2007 (aged 82); Boca Raton, Florida, U.S.
- Batted: Left Threw: Left

MLB debut
- April 22, 1951, for the Philadelphia Athletics

Last MLB appearance
- September 26, 1954, for the Philadelphia Athletics

MLB statistics
- Batting average: .202
- Home runs: 19
- Runs batted in: 62
- Stats at Baseball Reference

Teams
- Philadelphia Athletics (1951, 1954)

Louis Limmer (March 10, 1925 – April 1, 2007) was an American Major League Baseball player in 1951 and 1954 for the Philadelphia Athletics.

Limmer was born in the Bronx, New York, and was Jewish. He graduated from Manhattan High School of Aviation in 1943. Upon graduation, he joined the Army Air Corps, where he served until 1946.

Limmer played first base. He played in the Major Leagues for the Philadelphia Athletics in 1951 and 1954 and played and additional 11 years in the minors. He was in the top five for home runs seven times during his minor league career.

== Baseball career ==
Limmer was signed as a free agent by the Philadelphia Athletics in 1946.

In 1946, in 40 games for the Lexington A's of the North Carolina State League he hit .313.

In 1947 he hit .326 for Lexington, with 24 home runs (3rd in the league) and 95 RBIs (5th in the league) in 405 at bats.

With the Lincoln A's of the Western League in 1948, he broke his neck in August while sliding into third base. He suffered a temporary loss of vision and was out for the season. He hit 28 home runs (second in the league) and had 93 RBIs (6th in the league) in 385 at bats that season.

In 1949, he hit .315 (4th in the league) with a league-leading 29 home runs, and drove in 105 RBIs (3rd) as he scored 100 runs for Lincoln.

He followed that up in 1950, leading the league with both 29 home runs and 111 RBIs for the St. Paul Saints of the American Association, earning "Rookie of the Year" honors.

On April 23, 1951, Limmer batted against Vic Raschi with one out in the ninth inning, a runner on base, and the Athletics trailing the New York Yankees by a score of 5–2. He hit a two-run home run, the first hit of his career, but the Athletics still lost 5–4. Limmer holds the distinction of having hit the last home run and last base hit for the Athletics before their move to Kansas City.

Limmer was involved in the only all-Jewish confrontation in Major League history. On May 2, 1951, Limmer was batting in a game against the Detroit Tigers. Pitching for the Tigers was Saul Rogovin, and catching for the Tigers was Joe Ginsberg.

In 1952 he played for the A's AAA club in Ottawa, hitting 23 home runs (4th in the league).

His best offensive year in the major leagues was in 1954, when he had 73 hits and 14 home runs.

In 1955 he hit 28 home runs (3rd in the league) in 416 at bats for the Columbus Jets and Toronto Maple Leafs of the International League, playing both first base and outfield.

In 1958, his last year in baseball, he hit 30 home runs (2nd in the league), a career-high 31 doubles, and had 100 RBIs (4th) and 96 runs scored for the Birmingham Barons of the Southern Association.

He later became the only major leaguer to become president of a shul, the Castle Hill Community Jewish Center in the Bronx.

He died in Boca Raton, Florida and is survived by his wife Pearl, sons Craig and Dan, and four grandchildren, David, Sarah, Michael and Michelle.

== Hall of Fame ==
He is a member of the Philadelphia Jewish Sports Hall of Fame.
