= Bill Renna =

American baseball player (1924–2014)

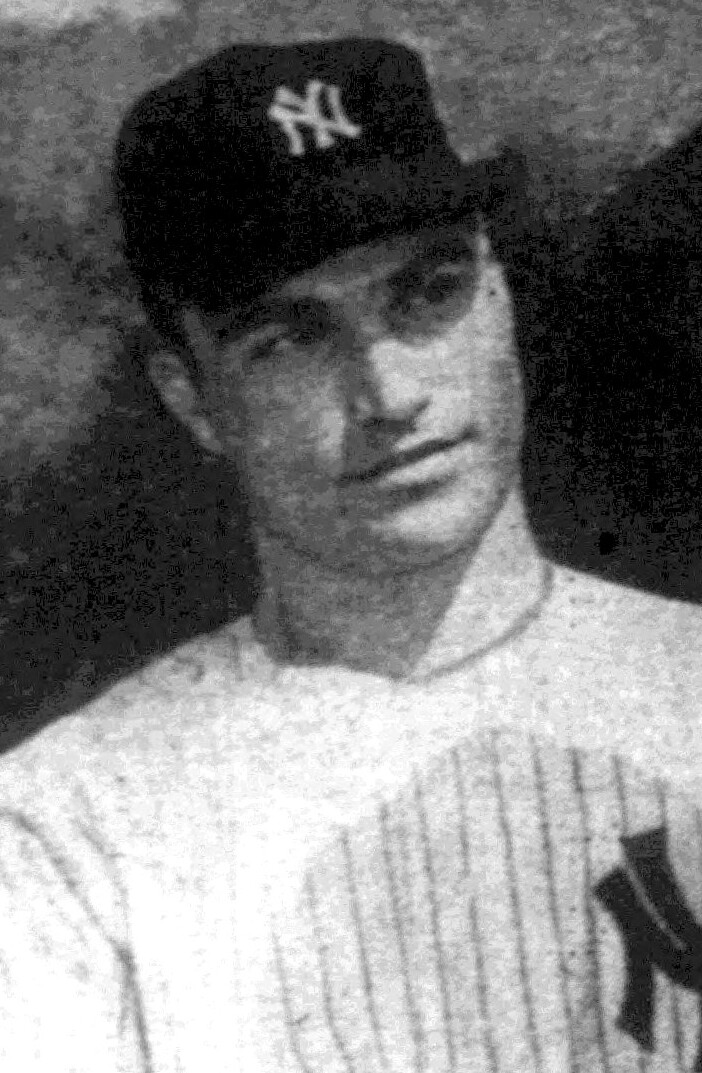
- Renna in 1953
- Outfielder
- Born: October 14, 1924; Hanford, California, U.S.
- Died: June 19, 2014 (aged 89); San Jose, California, U.S.

MLB debut
- April 14, 1953, for the New York Yankees

Last MLB appearance
- May 20, 1959, for the Boston Red Sox

MLB statistics
- Batting average: .239
- Home runs: 28
- Runs batted in: 119
- Stats at Baseball Reference

Teams
- New York Yankees (1953); Philadelphia / Kansas City Athletics (1954–1956); Boston Red Sox (1958–1959)

William Beneditto Renna (October 14, 1924 – June 19, 2014) was an American outfielder in Major League Baseball, playing mainly as a right fielder for four teams in part of five seasons spanning 1953–1959. Listed at 6 feet 3 inches (1.91 metres), 218 pounds (99 kg), Renna batted and threw right-handed. Nicknamed "Big Bill", he was one of the first of several Santa Clara University graduates to reach the Major League level.

Born in Hanford, California, Renna was the son of William and Christina Renna. He graduated from Hanford Union High School in 1942, and attended University of San Francisco before joining the U.S. Marine Corps and serving in the South Pacific during World War II.

After discharge, Renna attended Menlo College before transferring to SCU in 1947, where he was an outstanding athlete while playing baseball, basketball and football. Renna played in the East–West Shrine Game in 1949 and was selected for the All-American team that year.

Bill's first year in pro baseball was with the 1949 Twin Falls Cowboys. Bill's manager with that team, Charlie Metro, had this to say about him: "Bill Renna was a big football player at Santa Clara who the Yankees signed and sent to Twin Falls his first year. He hit like heck up there, and they called him 'Bull,' because he was a big guy. He was a delight to have on the team.... I had difficulty with the college players. They had their minds set on the way they wanted to play. Not all of them were problems though. Bill Renna, from Santa Clara College, was great, one of the finest players I had enjoyed handling."

Renna entered the majors in 1953 with the New York Yankees, playing one season for them before joining the Philadelphia Athletics (1954), Kansas City Athletics (1955–1956) and Boston Red Sox (1958–1959).

As a rookie in 1953, Renna hit a .314 batting average in 61 games for the Yankees, while in 1958, playing for the Red Sox, he hit .268 with four home runs and slugged .571 in 39 games, driving in 18 runs on 15 pinch-hit appearances.

His most productive season came in 1954 with the Philadelphia Athletics, when he posted career numbers in home runs (13), runs scored (52), runs batted in (53) and games (123), while hitting a .254 average. He led American League right fielders with five double plays, while tying for third overall among all outfielders behind Cleveland Indians' Larry Doby and Baltimore Orioles' Chuck Diering (six apiece).

In a six-season career, Renna was a .239 hitter (219-for-918) and slugged .391 with 28 home runs and 119 RBI in 370 games, including 123 runs, 36 doubles, 10 triples, two stolen bases and a .315 on-base percentage.

He also played in the Minor Leagues in part of seven seasons from 1949 to 1959, collecting a .287 average with 139 homers and 312 RBI in 741 game appearances.

Renna entered the baseball record books while playing for the Kansas City Blues of the American Association. On June 29, 1952, the Blues belted 10 home runs against the St. Paul Saints to set a league mark for most home runs in a single game by one team. Kansas City amassed 53 total bases and hit six homers in an inning (also AA marks) en route to a 17-4 win. Roy Partee hit three homers (including two in the big inning) while Renna, Vic Power and Kal Segrist added two apiece and Andy Carey hit one.

Renna was a longtime resident of San Jose, California, where he died in 2014 at the age of 89.

== Sources ==
- Baseball in Wartime
- Baseball Reference
- Retrosheet
