= 1954 Baltimore Orioles season =

Major League Baseball season

1954 Baltimore Orioles
- League: American League
- Ballpark: Memorial Stadium
- City: Baltimore, Maryland
- Record: 54–100 (.351)
- League place: 7th
- Owners: Jerold Hoffberger, Joseph Iglehart and Clarence Miles
- General managers: Arthur Ehlers, Paul Richards
- Managers: Jimmy Dykes
- Television: WMAR-TV/WAAM
- Radio: WCBM (Ernie Harwell, Howard Williams, Bailey Goss)

The 1954 Baltimore Orioles season saw the restoration of Major League Baseball to Baltimore after a 51-year absence, and the debut of the modern edition of the MLB Oriole franchise. Upon the transfer of the moribund St. Louis Browns on September 30, 1953, Baltimore returned to the American League over a half century after the Orioles of 1901–02 departed for New York City, where they eventually became the Yankees. The Baltimore Terrapins of the "outlaw" Federal League filled the void in 1914 and 1915, but the insurgent circuit collapsed without gaining recognition as a "third major league," and, as of 2022, its status remained in dispute. During most of its 51 seasons without a major-league team, Baltimore was represented in Organized Baseball by a top-level minor-league club, the Orioles of the International League.

For the American League franchise itself, its first season in Maryland actually was the 54th in its history: the team was originally founded as the Milwaukee Brewers in 1901, then transferred to Missouri as the Browns, who played from 1902 to 1953.

Inheriting the playing personnel of the 1953 Browns, the 1954 Orioles finished seventh in the eight-team American League with a record of 54 wins and 100 losses, 57 games behind the AL champion Cleveland Indians. The team was managed by Jimmy Dykes, and played its home games at Baltimore's Memorial Stadium, where it attracted 1,060,910 fans, fifth in the Junior Circuit but a massive 257 percent improvement over the 1953 Browns' totals. The franchise made a net profit of about $430,000. The new Orioles' games were broadcast over television and radio by the trio of Ernie Harwell, Howard Williams and Bailey Goss on WMAR-TV/WAAM (television) and WCBM (radio).

== Offseason ==
- November 30, 1953: Chuck Diering was purchased by the Orioles from the San Francisco Seals.
- February 2, 1954: Satchel Paige was released by the Orioles.
- February 5, 1954: Johnny Groth and Johnny Lipon were traded by the Orioles to the Chicago White Sox for Neil Berry and Sam Mele.
- April 8, 1954: Dave Koslo was acquired from the New York Giants.

== Regular season ==
- April 13, 1954: The Orioles opened their first season as the reborn Browns on the road, on April 13, 1954, at Briggs Stadium against the Detroit Tigers. The Tigers won, 3–0, on three solo home runs (from Ray Boone, Walt Dropo and Frank Bolling). Steve Gromek hurled the complete game shutout and Don Larsen (who would lose 21 of 24 decisions that year) was the hard-luck loser.
- April 15: Thousands of Baltimoreans jammed city streets as the new Orioles paraded from downtown to their new home at Memorial Stadium. During the 90-minute parade, the new Birds signed autographs, handed out pictures and threw styrofoam balls to the crowd as the throng marched down 33rd Street West. Inside, more than 46,000 watched the Orioles beat the Chicago White Sox, 3–1, to win their home opener and move into first place in the American League. Clint Courtney hit the first home run in modern Orioles history, a solo blow in the third inning. Ironically, the Orioles lost their last home game of the season, 11–0, to the same White Sox, finishing with 100 losses and 57 1/2 games out of first place.
- September 12: At Memorial Stadium, Joe Durham hit a solo home run off Philadelphia Athletics pitcher Al Sima in the sixth inning, to become the first African-American position player to belt a homer in Baltimore Orioles history.
- September 14: Paul Richards, manager of the White Sox since 1951, resigns his post to join the Orioles as both field manager and general manager. When Richards' signing was announced, ten games remained in the O's season. Dykes stayed on to finish the 1954 campaign as skipper, and Richards took over in the Baltimore dugout starting in 1955. Richards had compiled a 342–265 (.563) won–lost record as leader of the Pale Hose, turning around the fortunes of the formerly hapless franchise.

=== Opening day lineup, April 13, 1954 ===
5	Bobby Young	2B
3	Eddie Waitkus	1B
16	Gil Coan	CF
20	Vic Wertz	RF
15	Sam Mele	LF
4	Vern Stephens	3B
6	Billy Hunter	SS
11	Clint Courtney	C
27	Don Larsen	P

=== Season standings ===
American League
Team	W	L	Pct.	GB	Home	Road
Cleveland Indians	111	43	.721	—	59‍–‍18	52‍–‍25
New York Yankees	103	51	.669	8	54‍–‍23	49‍–‍28
Chicago White Sox	94	60	.610	17	45‍–‍32	49‍–‍28
Boston Red Sox	69	85	.448	42	38‍–‍39	31‍–‍46
Detroit Tigers	68	86	.442	43	35‍–‍42	33‍–‍44
Washington Senators	66	88	.429	45	37‍–‍41	29‍–‍47
Baltimore Orioles	54	100	.351	57	32‍–‍45	22‍–‍55
Philadelphia Athletics	51	103	.331	60	29‍–‍47	22‍–‍56

=== Record vs. opponents ===
1954 American League record Sources:
Team	BAL	BOS	CWS	CLE	DET	NYY	PHA	WSH
Baltimore	—	11–11	7–15	3–19	8–14	5–17	10–12	10–12
Boston	11–11	—	5–17	2–20–2	14–8	9–13	15–7	13–9
Chicago	15–7	17–5	—	11–11	12–10–1	7–15	17–5	15–7
Cleveland	19–3	20–2–2	11–11	—	14–8	11–11	18–4	18–4
Detroit	14–8	8–14	10–12–1	8–14	—	6–16	13–9	9–13
New York	17–5	13–9	15–7	11–11	16–6	—	18–4–1	13–9
Philadelphia	12–10	7–15	5–17	4–18	9–13	4–18–1	—	10–12–1
Washington	12–10	9–13	7–15	4–18	13–9	9–13	12–10–1	—

=== Notable transactions ===
- May 11, 1954: Neil Berry, Dick Kokos and Jim Post (minors) were traded by the Orioles to the New York Yankees for Jim Brideweser.
- May 12, 1954: Don Lenhardt was acquired from the Orioles by the Boston Red Sox.
- May 25, 1954: Dick Littlefield was traded by the Orioles to the Pittsburgh Pirates for Cal Abrams.
- June 1, 1954: Vic Wertz was traded by the Orioles to the Cleveland Indians for Bob Chakales.
- July 4, 1954: Marlin Stuart was claimed off waivers from the Orioles by the New York Yankees.
- August 7, 1954: Bob Kuzava was claimed off waivers by the Orioles from the New York Yankees.

=== Roster ===
1954 Baltimore Orioles
Roster
Pitchers: 24 Vern Bickford; 34 Mike Blyzka; 20 Bob Chakales; 35 Joe Coleman; 21 Ryne Duren; 21,37 Howie Fox; 38 Jay Heard; 22,24 Dave Koslo; 23 Lou Kretlow; 15 Bob Kuzava; 27 Don Larsen; 18 Dick Littlefield; 24 Billy O'Dell; 28 Duane Pillette; 26 Marlin Stuart; 33 Bob Turley	Catchers: 11 Clint Courtney; 10 Les Moss; 9 Ray Murray; Infielders: 2 Neil Berry; 2 Jim Brideweser; 1 Chico García; 6 Billy Hunter; 7 Frank Kellert; 40 Bob Kennedy; 8 Dick Kryhoski; 4 Vern Stephens; 3 Eddie Waitkus; 5 Bobby Young	Outfielders: 18 Cal Abrams; 16 Gil Coan; 32 Chuck Diering; 43 Joe Durham; 17 Jim Fridley; 19 Dick Kokos; 14 Don Lenhardt; 15 Sam Mele; 20 Vic Wertz	Manager: 25 Jimmy Dykes; Coaches: 31 Harry Brecheen; 29 Tom Oliver; 30 Frank Skaff

== Player stats ==
=== Batting ===
==== Starters by position ====
Note: Pos = Position; G = Games played; AB = At bats; H = Hits; Avg. = Batting average; HR = Home runs; RBI = Runs batted in

Pos	Player	G	AB	H	Avg.	HR	RBI
C	Clint Courtney	122	397	107	.270	4	37
1B	Eddie Waitkus	95	311	88	.283	2	33
2B	Bobby Young	130	432	106	.245	4	24
3B	Vern Stephens	101	365	104	.285	8	46
SS	Billy Hunter	125	411	100	.243	2	27
LF	Jim Fridley	85	240	59	.246	4	36
CF	Chuck Diering	128	418	108	.258	2	29
RF	Cal Abrams	115	423	124	.293	6	25

==== Other batters ====
Note: G = Games played; AB = At bats; H = Hits; Avg. = Batting average; HR = Home runs; RBI = Runs batted in

Player	G	AB	H	Avg.	HR	RBI
Bob Kennedy	106	323	81	.251	6	45
Dick Kryhoski	100	300	78	.260	1	34
Gil Coan	94	265	74	.279	2	20
Sam Mele	72	230	55	.239	5	32
Jim Brideweser	73	204	54	.265	0	12
Les Moss	50	126	31	.246	0	5
Vic Wertz	29	94	19	.202	1	13
Chico García	39	62	7	.113	0	5
Ray Murray	22	61	15	.246	0	2
Joe Durham	10	40	9	.225	1	3
Frank Kellert	10	34	7	.206	0	1
Don Lenhardt	13	33	5	.152	0	1
Dick Kokos	11	10	2	.200	1	1
Neil Berry	5	9	1	.111	0	0

=== Pitching ===
==== Starting pitchers ====
Note: G = Games pitched; IP = Innings pitched; W = Wins; L = Losses; ERA = Earned run average; SO = Strikeouts

Player	G	IP	W	L	ERA	SO
Bob Turley	35	247.1	14	15	3.46	185
Joe Coleman	33	221.1	13	17	3.50	103
Don Larsen	29	201.2	3	21	4.37	80
Duane Pillette	25	179.0	10	14	3.12	66
Bob Kuzava	4	23.2	1	3	4.18	15
Vern Bickford	1	4.0	0	1	9.00	0

==== Other pitchers ====
Note: G = Games pitched; IP = Innings pitched; W = Wins; L = Losses; ERA = Earned run average; SO = Strikeouts

Player	G	IP	W	L	ERA	SO
Lou Kretlow	32	166.2	6	11	4.37	82
Billy O'Dell	7	16.1	1	1	2.76	6
Dave Koslo	3	14.1	0	1	3.14	3

==== Relief pitchers ====
Note: G = Games pitched; W = Wins; L = Losses; SV = Saves; ERA = Earned run average; SO = Strikeouts

Player	G	W	L	SV	ERA	SO
Bob Chakales	38	3	7	4	3.73	44
Howie Fox	38	1	2	2	3.67	27
Mike Blyzka	37	1	5	1	4.69	35
Marlin Stuart	22	1	2	2	4.46	13
Dick Littlefield	3	0	0	0	10.50	5
Jay Heard	2	0	0	0	13.50	2
Ryne Duren	1	0	0	0	9.00	2

== Awards and honors ==
1954 Major League Baseball All-Star Game

- Bob Turley

== Farm system ==
Level	Team	League	Manager
AA	San Antonio Missions	Texas League	Don Heffner
A	Wichita Indians	Western League	Herb Brett and Les Layton
A	Lewiston Broncs	Western International League	Larry Barton, Sr.
B	York White Roses	Piedmont League	George Staller
B	Anderson Rebels	Tri-State League	Virgil Stallcup, Fred Boiko and Bob Knoke
C	Pine Bluff Judges	Cotton States League	Frank Lucchesi and Bill Enos
C	Aberdeen Pheasants	Northern League	Barney Lutz
C	Thetford Mines Mineurs	Provincial League	Bill Krueger
D	Wytheville Statesmen	Appalachian League	Joe Murray, Bill Enos and Jim Cisternelli
D	Americus-Cordele Orioles	Georgia–Florida League	Cliff Melton and Jack Landis
D	Ada Herefords/Cementers	Sooner State League	Louis Brower and John Densmore
D	Marion Marauders	Tar Heel League	Bob Knoke

Tar Heel League disbanded, June 21, 1954
