= 1950 World Series =

1950 Major League Baseball championship series

Team (Wins)	Managers	Season
New York Yankees (4)	Casey Stengel	98–56, .636, GA: 3
Philadelphia Phillies (0)	Eddie Sawyer	91–63, .591, GA: 2
- Dates: October 4–7
- Venue(s): Shibe Park (Philadelphia); Yankee Stadium (New York)
- Umpires: Jocko Conlan (NL), Bill McGowan (AL), Dusty Boggess (NL), Charlie Berry (AL), Al Barlick (NL: outfield only), Bill McKinley (AL: outfield only)
- Hall of Famers: Umpires: Al Barlick; Jocko Conlan; Bill McGowan; Yankees: Casey Stengel (manager); Yogi Berra; Joe DiMaggio; Whitey Ford; Johnny Mize; Phil Rizzuto; Phillies: Richie Ashburn; Robin Roberts

Broadcast
- Television: NBC; CBS; ABC
- TV announcers: Jim Britt and Jack Brickhouse
- Radio: Mutual
- Radio announcers: Mel Allen and Gene Kelly

The 1950 World Series was the 47th World Series between the American and National Leagues for the championship of Major League Baseball. The Philadelphia Phillies as 1950 champions of the National League and the New York Yankees, as 1950 American League champions, competed to win a best-of-seven game series.

The Series began on Wednesday, October 4, and concluded Saturday, October 7. The Phillies had home field advantage for the Series, meaning no games would be played at the Yankees' home ballpark, Yankee Stadium, until game 3. The Yankees won their 13th championship in their 41-year history, taking the Series in a four-game sweep. The final game in the Series resulted in the New York Yankees winning, 5–2 over Philadelphia. It was the only game in the Series decided by more than one run. The 1950 World Series title would be the second of a record five straight titles for the New York Yankees (1949–1953). The two teams would not again meet in the Series for 59 years.

This was also the last World Series to have no American born black players until 2022, as neither club had integrated in 1950. It was also the last World Series where television coverage was pooled between multiple networks: earlier that year the Mutual Broadcasting System, which had long been the radio home for the World Series, purchased the exclusive TV rights for the following season despite not (and indeed, never) having a television network. They would eventually sell on the rights to NBC, beginning a long relationship with the sport for that network.

The Yankees and Phillies faced each other again 59 years later in the 2009 World Series, in which the Yankees also won, this time in six games to win their 27th World Series championship.

== Teams ==
=== Philadelphia Phillies ===
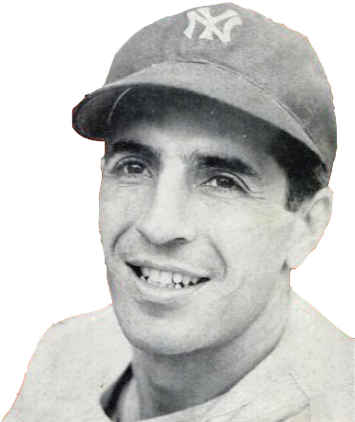
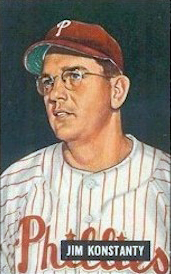
Phil Rizzuto (at left) and Jim Konstanty were the 1950 MVPs for the American League and National League, respectively.

The Phillies, a particularly young team which came to be known as the "Whiz Kids", had won the National League pennant in dramatic fashion on the final day of the season to garner their second pennant—their first in 35 years. But writing in The New York Times on October 3, 1950, John Drebinger picked the Yankees to win the Series in five games: "The Stengelers simply have too much over-all pitching. They have the long range power. They posses [sic] rare defensive skill, and they have the poise and experience gained through the past four years which brought them two world championships and three pennants." Odds makers made the Yankees 2–5 favorites to win the Series.

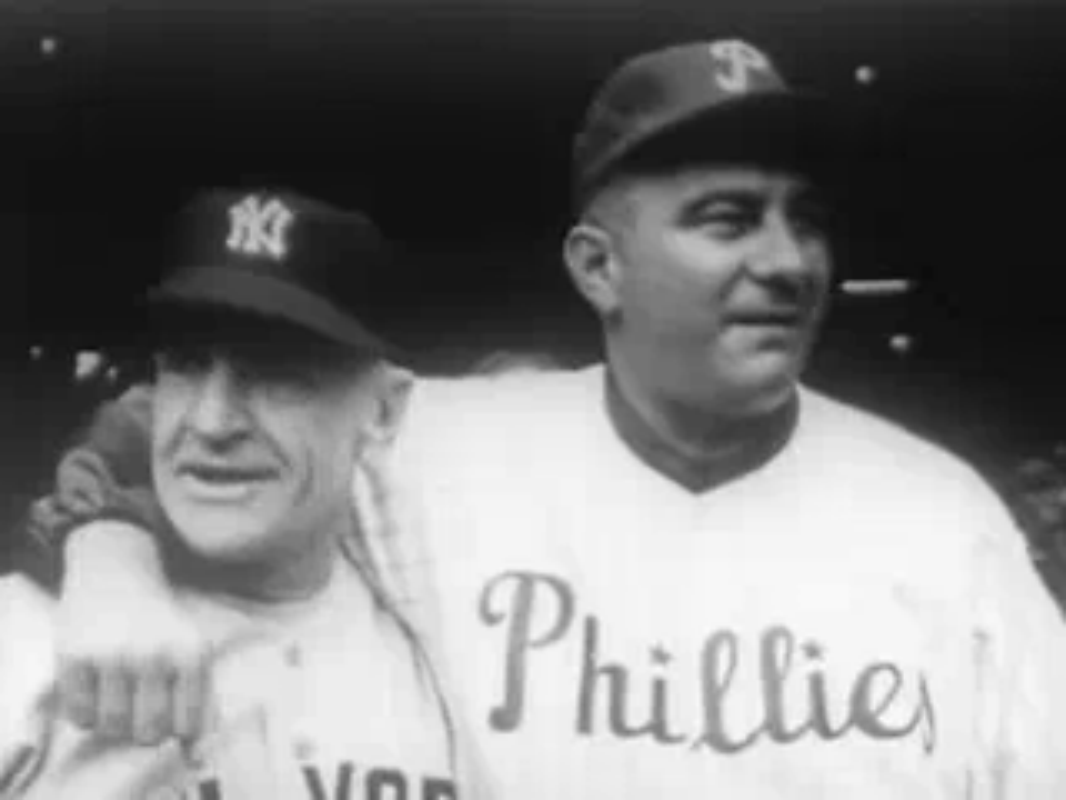
Yankees manager Casey Stengel with Phillies skipper Eddie Sawyer before Game 1

Curt Simmons, a 17-game winner for the Phillies in 1950, had been called to military duty in September and was unavailable for this Series. Simmons was stationed at Camp Atterbury and requested and was granted a leave on October 4 to attend the Series. The Phillies chose not to request that Commissioner Chandler rule Simmons eligible for the Series but Simmons chose to attend to support the team. Simmons' place on the Series roster was taken by pitcher Jocko Thompson. Phillies ace Robin Roberts didn't start Game 1 because he had had three starts in five days including the pennant winner on the final day of the regular season—played October 1, 1950 (three days before Game 1).

=== New York Yankees ===
The AL champion Yankees finished the regular season with a record of 98–56, three games ahead of the Detroit Tigers. Offensive team leaders were Phil Rizzuto (.324 batting average), Joe DiMaggio (32 home runs, .585 slugging percentage, and .979 OPS), and Yogi Berra (124 RBIs). Pitcher Vic Raschi led the team in wins, with a 21–8 record, and 256 2/3 innings pitched. Rizzuto was voted the American League MVP, while Berra finished third, Raschi seventh, and DiMaggio ninth.

== Summary ==
AL New York Yankees (4) vs. NL Philadelphia Phillies (0)

Game	Date	Score	Location	Time	Attendance
1	October 4	New York Yankees – 1, Philadelphia Phillies – 0	Shibe Park	2:17	30,746
2	October 5	New York Yankees – 2, Philadelphia Phillies – 1 (10)	Shibe Park	3:06	32,660
3	October 6	Philadelphia Phillies – 2, New York Yankees – 3	Yankee Stadium	2:35	64,505
4	October 7	Philadelphia Phillies – 2, New York Yankees – 5	Yankee Stadium	2:05	68,098

== Matchups ==
=== Game 1 ===
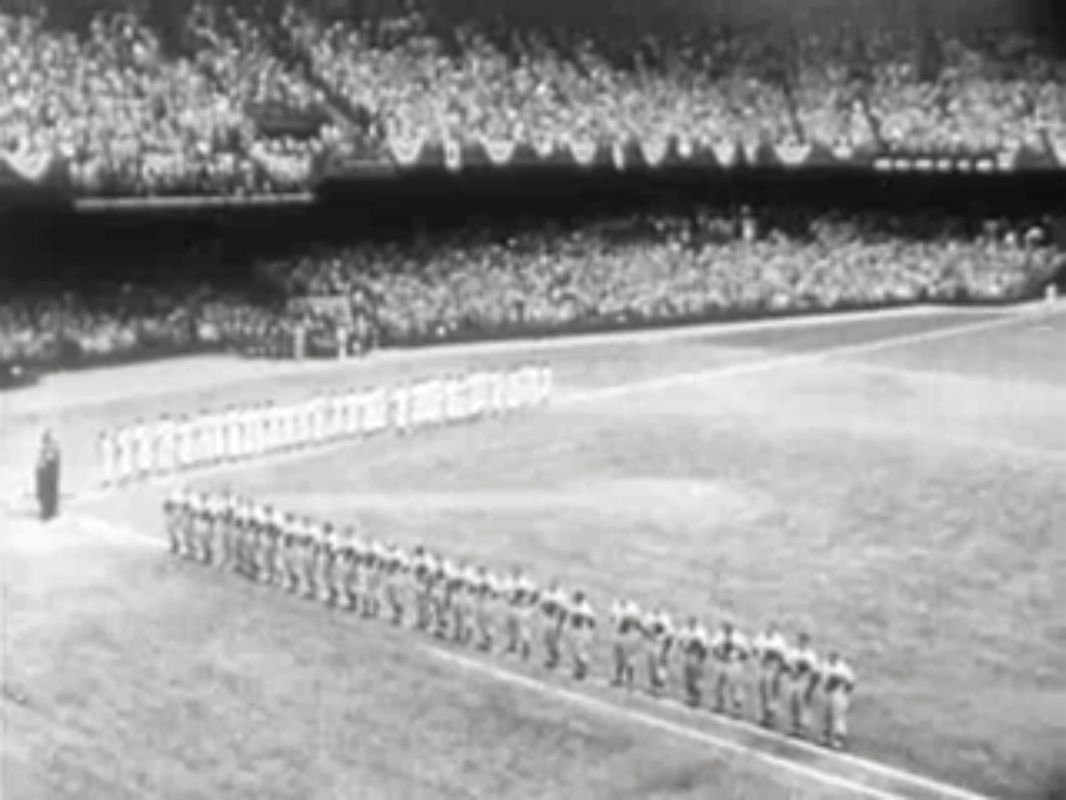
The Yankees and Phillies lining up prior to Game 1 at Shibe Park.

October 4, 1950 1:00 pm (ET) at Shibe Park in Philadelphia, Pennsylvania
Team	1	2	3	4	5	6	7	8	9	R	H	E
New York	0	0	0	1	0	0	0	0	0	1	5	0
Philadelphia	0	0	0	0	0	0	0	0	0	0	2	1
WP: Vic Raschi (1–0) LP: Jim Konstanty (0–1)

Because his #1 starter, Robin Roberts, had just pitched in three of the last five games of the frantic 1950 pennant race, Phils manager Eddie Sawyer surprised the world by naming his bullpen ace, Jim Konstanty, to open on the mound for Philadelphia, opposing 21-game winner Vic Raschi of the Yankees. Konstanty was outstanding, allowing just four hits and a run in eight innings, but Raschi was tougher, shutting out the Phils on only two hits en route to a 1–0 victory in the opener. The game's only run came in the fourth when Bobby Brown hit a leadoff double and scored on two fly-outs, the last one a sacrifice fly by Jerry Coleman. This marked the third consecutive year that the World Series opened with a 1–0 game, and the third consecutive year a two-hitter was thrown in the opening game of the World Series.

=== Game 2 ===
Joe DiMaggio catches Del Ennis' deep fly

October 5, 1950 1:00 pm (ET) at Shibe Park in Philadelphia, Pennsylvania
Team	1	2	3	4	5	6	7	8	9	10	R	H	E
New York	0	1	0	0	0	0	0	0	0	1	2	10	0
Philadelphia	0	0	0	0	1	0	0	0	0	0	1	7	0
WP: Allie Reynolds (1–0) LP: Robin Roberts (0–1); Home runs: NYY: Joe DiMaggio (1); PHI: None

In what would be the last postseason game ever played in Shibe Park, 20-game winner Robin Roberts and Allie Reynolds both pitched outstanding baseball for nine innings, as strong pitching and stout defense again prevailed in the Series. Gene Woodling drove in Jerry Coleman, who walked with two outs and moved to second on a single, with an RBI single for a Yankee run in the second, and Richie Ashburn's sacrifice fly scored Mike Goliat from third in the fifth, forcing a 1–1 tie which held up through nine full innings. This set the stage for Joe DiMaggio, leading off the tenth inning for the Yankees. With one swing, DiMaggio smashed a home run to left field to provide the difference in a 2–1 extra-inning win for the Yankees as the Series shifted to New York.

DiMaggio had a hand in holding the Phillies at bay long enough to get his key at-bat. Leading off the sixth inning, Del Ennis hit a deep fly to center, but DiMaggio made a spectacular over-the-shoulder running catch, near the 400-foot (120 m) marker at the base of the scoreboard in right-center. This play is far less well-known but was similar-looking to the famous Willie Mays catch in the 1954 World Series. DiMaggio made this play on the road, although in a ballpark which he played in during the regular season (Shibe Park was also the home of the Philadelphia A's). Because there was nobody on when the ball was hit, he was not in a hurry to get the ball back to the infield (Mays' famous 1954 catch was deeper, with two runners on base and nobody out when the ball was hit).

=== Game 3 ===
Jerry Coleman, after delivering the go-ahead run in Game 1, delivered again with an RBI hit in the bottom half of the 9th inning of Game 3.

October 6, 1950 1:00 pm (ET) at Yankee Stadium in Bronx, New York
Team	1	2	3	4	5	6	7	8	9	R	H	E
Philadelphia	0	0	0	0	0	1	1	0	0	2	10	2
New York	0	0	1	0	0	0	0	1	1	3	7	0
WP: Tom Ferrick (1–0) LP: Russ Meyer (0–1)

Phils lefty Ken Heintzelman started the third game against Yankee stalwart Eddie Lopat. The Yankees struck first in the third when Phil Rizzuto walked with two outs, stole second and scored on a single by Jerry Coleman, who was tagged out at second to end the inning. In the sixth, Del Ennis doubled with two outs and scored on Dick Sisler's single to tie the game. Next inning Granny Hamner hit a leadoff single, moved to second on a sacrifice bunt and scored on Mike Goliat's single to put the Phillies up 2–1. Heintzelman continued the Phils' great pitching into the eighth inning, when he lost control and walked the bases loaded after two outs. Konstanty relieved him and got Bobby Brown to ground to shortstop Granny Hamner, but Hamner misplayed the ball to allow the tying run to score. Russ Meyer came on for the Phillies in the last of the ninth. After retiring the first two batters, Meyer allowed consecutive singles to set the stage for Jerry Coleman, who drove in the winning run with a base hit to give the Yankees a 3–2 win.

In attendance at the game was Grover Cleveland Alexander, who had led the Phillies to their previous pennant in 1915. It was his first World Series game in 20 years. Suffering from the effects of long term alcohol abuse, Alexander was generally ignored by the crowd. He would be dead less than a month later on November 4, 1950, at age 63.

=== Game 4 ===
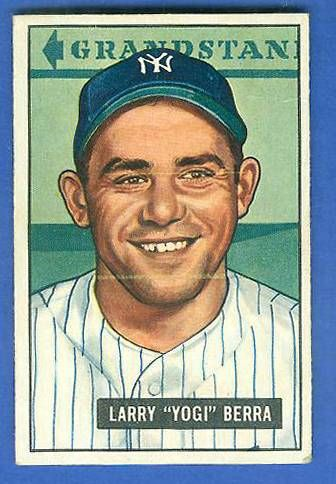
Yogi Berra

October 7, 1950 1:00 pm (ET) at Yankee Stadium in Bronx, New York
Team	1	2	3	4	5	6	7	8	9	R	H	E
Philadelphia	0	0	0	0	0	0	0	0	2	2	7	1
New York	2	0	0	0	0	3	0	0	X	5	8	2
WP: Whitey Ford (1–0) LP: Bob Miller (0–1) Sv: Allie Reynolds (1); Home runs: PHI: None; NYY: Yogi Berra (1)

Phillies starter Bob Miller matched up against rookie Whitey Ford, making his first World Series appearance, as the Yankees tried to wrap up the Series in four straight. New York scored two runs in the first inning when Gene Woodling reached when second baseman Mike Goliat misplayed his ground ball, moved to second on a ground ball, and scored on Yogi Berra's single. After a wild pitch, Joe DiMaggio's RBI double made it 2–0 Yankees. Berra hit a leadoff home run in the sixth off of Jim Konstanty, who then hit DiMaggio with a pitch. After a groundout, Bobby Brown's RBI triple and Hank Bauer's sacrifice fly made it 5–0 Yankees. The first two Phils reached base in the ninth via a single and hit-by-pitch before Ford got the next two outs. Andy Seminick then flied to left, but left fielder Gene Woodling dropped what looked like the Series-ending out, allowing two runs to score. Mike Goliat kept the inning going with a hit, and Stengel removed Ford to bring in Allie Reynolds. Reynolds struck out pinch-hitter Stan Lopata, giving the Yanks a 5–2 win and the World Series victory.

The Phillies failed to hit a home run in the entire World Series. No other team has matched that dubious feat since.

== Composite box ==
1950 World Series (4–0): New York Yankees (A.L.) over Philadelphia Phillies (N.L.)

Team	1	2	3	4	5	6	7	8	9	10	R	H	E
New York Yankees	2	1	1	1	0	3	0	1	1	1	11	30	2
Philadelphia Phillies	0	0	0	0	1	1	1	0	2	0	5	26	4
Total attendance: 196,009 Average attendance: 49,002; Winning player's share: $5,738 Losing player's share: $4,081

The winning margin of six runs remains the lowest for a four-game sweep, later equaled in 2005.

== Earned runs ==
- During the Series, the New York Yankees pitching rotation only allowed three earned runs and finished the Fall Classic with a combined 0.73 ERA. The other pitching staffs with a combined World Series ERA less than 1.00:

League	Team	ERA	Year
N.L.	New York Giants	0.00	1905
A.L.	Baltimore Orioles	0.50	1966
N.L.	Chicago Cubs	0.75	1907
A.L.	Cleveland Indians	0.89	1920

== Aftermath ==
The Phillies once again fell into a slump after the World Series loss. Their next postseason appearance would come in 1976, where they were swept by the eventual World Series champion Cincinnati Reds in the NLCS. The Phillies would eventually return to the World Series in 1980, where they defeated the Kansas City Royals in six games for their first championship after a 77-year wait.

This was the second of five straight championships won by the Yankees. They would complete their second three-peat in team history the next year by defeating their cross-town rivals in the New York Giants in six games.

== See also ==
- 1950 Japan Series
- List of World Series sweeps
