= List of World Series career records =

The following is a list of World Series records set the course of a player's career. Note that the teams listed are the ones with whom the player made their World Series appearances, which are not necessarily their primary teams or all the teams they played with throughout their career.

== Batting ==
=== Batting average ===
Minimum 35 plate appearances
#	Player	Team(s)	BA	PA
1	David Ortiz	Boston Red Sox	.455	59
2	Bobby Brown	New York Yankees	.439	46
3	Marty Barrett	Boston Red Sox	.433	35
4	Pablo Sandoval	San Francisco Giants	.426	50
5	Paul Molitor	Milwaukee Brewers; Toronto Blue Jays	.418	61
6	Pepper Martin	St. Louis Cardinals	.418	60
7	Lance Berkman	Houston Astros; St. Louis Cardinals	.410	50
8	Hal McRae	Kansas City Royals; Cincinnati Reds	.400	50
9	Tony Fernández	Toronto Blue Jays; Cleveland Indians	.395	44
10	Monte Irvin	New York Giants	.394	36

=== On-base percentage ===
Minimum 35 plate appearances
#	Player	Team(s)	OBP	PA
1	David Ortiz	Boston Red Sox	.576	59
2	Lance Berkman	Houston Astros; St. Louis Cardinals	.520	50
3	Marty Barrett	Boston Red Sox	.514	35
4	Jayson Werth	Philadelphia Phillies	.500	48
	Bobby Brown	New York Yankees	.500	46
6	Carlos Ruiz	Philadelphia Phillies	.488	43
7	Hank Thompson	New York Giants	.486	37
8	Lou Gehrig	New York Yankees	.483	148
9	Paul Molitor	Milwaukee Brewers; Toronto Blue Jays	.475	61
10	Juan Soto	Washington Nationals; New York Yankees	.473	55

=== Slugging percentage ===
Minimum 35 plate appearances
#	Player	Team(s)	SLG%	PA
1	George Springer	Houston Astros	.839	68
2	Freddie Freeman	Atlanta Braves; Los Angeles Dodgers	.810	47
3	David Ortiz	Boston Red Sox	.795	59
4	Reggie Jackson	Oakland Athletics; New York Yankees	.755	116
5	Hideki Matsui	New York Yankees	.750	41
6	Babe Ruth	Boston Red Sox; New York Yankees	.744	166
7	Lou Gehrig	New York Yankees	.731	148
8	Bobby Brown	New York Yankees	.707	46
9	Carlos Ruiz	Philadelphia Phillies	.706	43
10	Pablo Sandoval	San Francisco Giants	.702	50

=== Plate appearances ===
#	Player	Team(s)	PA
1	Yogi Berra	New York Yankees	295
2	Mickey Mantle	New York Yankees	273
3	Joe DiMaggio	New York Yankees	220
4	Phil Rizzuto	New York Yankees	219
5	Frankie Frisch	New York Giants; St. Louis Cardinals	216
6	Gil McDougald	New York Yankees	215
7	Hank Bauer	New York Yankees	199
8	Pee Wee Reese	Brooklyn Dodgers	191
9	Elston Howard	New York Yankees; Boston Red Sox	189
10	Derek Jeter	New York Yankees	173

=== At bats ===
#	Player	Team(s)	At bats
1	Yogi Berra	New York Yankees	259
2	Mickey Mantle	New York Yankees	230
3	Joe DiMaggio	New York Yankees	199
4	Frankie Frisch	New York Giants; St. Louis Cardinals	197
5	Gil McDougald	New York Yankees	190
6	Hank Bauer	New York Yankees	188
7	Phil Rizzuto	New York Yankees	183
8	Elston Howard	New York Yankees; Boston Red Sox	171
9	Pee Wee Reese	Brooklyn Dodgers	169
10	Derek Jeter	New York Yankees	156

=== Games played ===
#	Player	Team(s)	Games played
1	Yogi Berra	New York Yankees	75
2	Mickey Mantle	New York Yankees	65
3	Elston Howard	New York Yankees; Boston Red Sox	54
4	Gil McDougald	New York Yankees	53
	Hank Bauer	New York Yankees	53
6	Phil Rizzuto	New York Yankees	52
7	Joe DiMaggio	New York Yankees	51
8	Frankie Frisch	New York Giants; St. Louis Cardinals	50
9	Pee Wee Reese	Brooklyn Dodgers	44
10	Roger Maris	New York Yankees; St. Louis Cardinals	41
	Babe Ruth	Boston Red Sox; New York Yankees	41

=== Hits ===
#	Player	Team(s)	Hits
1	Yogi Berra	New York Yankees	71
2	Mickey Mantle	New York Yankees	59
3	Frankie Frisch	New York Giants; St. Louis Cardinals	58
4	Joe DiMaggio	New York Yankees	54
5	Derek Jeter	New York Yankees	50
6	Hank Bauer	New York Yankees	46
	Pee Wee Reese	Brooklyn Dodgers	46
8	Phil Rizzuto	New York Yankees	45
	Gil McDougald	New York Yankees	45
10	Lou Gehrig	New York Yankees	43

==== Singles ====
#	Player	Team(s)	Singles
1	Yogi Berra	New York Yankees	49
2	Frankie Frisch	New York Giants; St. Louis Cardinals	45
3	Joe DiMaggio	New York Yankees	40
	Phil Rizzuto	New York Yankees	40
5	Pee Wee Reese	Brooklyn Dodgers	39
6	Derek Jeter	New York Yankees	37
7	Hank Bauer	New York Yankees	34
8	Mickey Mantle	New York Yankees	33
	Gil McDougald	New York Yankees	33
	Eddie Collins	New York Yankees	33

==== Doubles ====
#	Player	Team(s)	Doubles
1	Yogi Berra	New York Yankees	10
	Frankie Frisch	New York Giants; St. Louis Cardinals	10
3	Derek Jeter	New York Yankees	9
	Carl Furillo	Brooklyn / Los Angeles Dodgers	9
	Jack Barry	Philadelphia Athletics; Boston Red Sox	9
	Pete Fox	Detroit Tigers	9
8	Lou Gehrig	New York Yankees	8
	Duke Snider	Brooklyn / Los Angeles Dodgers	8
	Lonnie Smith	Philadelphia Phillies; St. Louis Cardinals; Kansas City Royals; Atlanta Braves	8
	Jose Altuve	Houston Astros	8
	Justin Turner	Los Angeles Dodgers	8

==== Triples ====
#	Player	Team(s)	Triples
1	Tris Speaker	Boston Red Sox; Cleveland Indians	4
	Tommy Leach	Pittsburgh Pirates	4
	Billy Johnson	New York Yankees	4
4	Frankie Frisch	New York Giants; St. Louis Cardinals	3
	Hank Bauer	New York Yankees	3
	Lou Gehrig	New York Yankees	3
	Bob Meusel	New York Yankees	3
	Billy Martin	New York Yankees	3
	Mark Lemke	Atlanta Braves	3
	Devon White	Toronto Blue Jays; Florida Marlins	3
	Tim McCarver	St. Louis Cardinals	3
	Dave Concepción	Cincinnati Reds	3
	Dan Gladden	Minnesota Twins	3
	Bobby Brown	New York Yankees	3
	Buck Freeman	Boston Americans	3
	Freddy Parent	Boston Americans	3
	Chick Stahl	Boston Americans	3

==== Home runs ====
#	Player	Team(s)	Home runs
1	Mickey Mantle	New York Yankees	18
2	Babe Ruth	Boston Red Sox; New York Yankees	15
3	Yogi Berra	New York Yankees	12
4	Duke Snider	Brooklyn / Los Angeles Dodgers	11
5	Lou Gehrig	New York Yankees	10
	Reggie Jackson	Oakland Athletics; New York Yankees	10
7	Joe DiMaggio	New York Yankees	8
	Bill Skowron	New York Yankees; Los Angeles Dodgers	8
	Frank Robinson	Cincinnati Reds; Baltimore Orioles	8
10	Gil McDougald	New York Yankees	7
	Hank Bauer	New York Yankees	7
	Goose Goslin	Washington Senators; Detroit Tigers	7
	George Springer	Houston Astros	7
	Chase Utley	Philadelphia Phillies; Los Angeles Dodgers	7

=== Runs batted in ===
#	Player	Team(s)	RBIs
1	Mickey Mantle	New York Yankees	40
2	Yogi Berra	New York Yankees	39
3	Lou Gehrig	New York Yankees	35
4	Babe Ruth	Boston Red Sox; New York Yankees	33
5	Joe DiMaggio	New York Yankees	30
6	Bill Skowron	New York Yankees; Los Angeles Dodgers	29
7	Duke Snider	Brooklyn / Los Angeles Dodgers	26
8	Gil McDougald	New York Yankees	24
	Hank Bauer	New York Yankees	24
	Bill Dickey	New York Yankees	24
	Reggie Jackson	Oakland Athletics; New York Yankees	24

=== Runs scored ===
#	Player	Team(s)	Runs scored
1	Mickey Mantle	New York Yankees	42
2	Yogi Berra	New York Yankees	41
3	Babe Ruth	Boston Red Sox; New York Yankees	37
4	Derek Jeter	New York Yankees	32
5	Lou Gehrig	New York Yankees	30
6	Joe DiMaggio	New York Yankees	27
7	Roger Maris	New York Yankees; St. Louis Cardinals	26
8	Elston Howard	New York Yankees; Boston Red Sox	25
9	Gil McDougald	New York Yankees	23
10	Jackie Robinson	Brooklyn Dodgers	22

=== Total bases ===
#	Player	Team(s)	TB
1	Mickey Mantle	New York Yankees	123
2	Yogi Berra	New York Yankees	117
3	Babe Ruth	Boston Red Sox; New York Yankees	96
4	Lou Gehrig	New York Yankees	87
5	Joe DiMaggio	New York Yankees	84
6	Duke Snider	Brooklyn / Los Angeles Dodgers	79
7	Hank Bauer	New York Yankees	75
8	Frankie Frisch	New York Giants; St. Louis Cardinals	74
	Reggie Jackson	Oakland Athletics; New York Yankees	74
10	Gil McDougald	New York Yankees	72

=== Base on balls ===
#	Player	Team(s)	Base on Balls
1	Mickey Mantle	New York Yankees	43
2	Babe Ruth	Boston Red Sox; New York Yankees	33
3	Yogi Berra	New York Yankees	32
4	Phil Rizzuto	New York Yankees	30
5	David Justice	Atlanta Braves; Cleveland Indians; New York Yankees	26
	Lou Gehrig	New York Yankees	26
7	Mickey Cochrane	Philadelphia Athletics; Detroit Tigers	25
8	Jim Gilliam	Brooklyn / Los Angeles Dodgers	23
9	Jackie Robinson	Brooklyn Dodgers	21
10	Gil McDougald	New York Yankees	20
	Bernie Williams	New York Yankees	20

=== Strikeouts ===
#	Player	Team(s)	Strikeouts
1	Mickey Mantle	New York Yankees	54
2	Derek Jeter	New York Yankees	39
3	Elston Howard	New York Yankees; Boston Red Sox	37
4	Duke Snider	Brooklyn / Los Angeles Dodgers	33
5	Jorge Posada	New York Yankees	31
6	David Justice	Atlanta Braves; Cleveland Indians; New York Yankees	30
	Babe Ruth	Boston Red Sox; New York Yankees	30
8	Cody Bellinger	Los Angeles Dodgers	29
	Gil McDougald	New York Yankees	29
10	Bill Skowron	New York Yankees; Los Angeles Dodgers	26
	Bernie Williams	New York Yankees	26

=== Stolen bases ===
#	Player	Team(s)	Stolen bases
1	Lou Brock	St. Louis Cardinals	14
	Eddie Collins	Philadelphia Athletics; Chicago White Sox	14
3	Davey Lopes	Los Angeles Dodgers	10
	Phil Rizzuto	New York Yankees	10
5	Honus Wagner	Pittsburgh Pirates	9
	Kenny Lofton	Cleveland Indians; San Francisco Giants	9
	Frank Chance	Chicago Cubs	9
	Frankie Frisch	New York Giants; St. Louis Cardinals	9
9	Joe Tinker	Chicago Cubs	8
	Johnny Evers	Chicago Cubs; Boston Braves	8

=== Hit by pitch ===
#	Player	Team(s)	HBP	Games played
1	Anthony Rizzo	Chicago Cubs; New York Yankees	4	12
	Albert Pujols	St. Louis Cardinals	4	16
3	Alex Rodriguez	New York Yankees	3	6
	Mark Teixeira	New York Yankees	3	6
	Max Carey	Pittsburgh Pirates	3	7
	Willy Taveras	Houston Astros; Colorado Rockies	3	7
	Honus Wagner	Pittsburgh Pirates	3	15
	Fred Snodgrass	New York Giants	3	16
	Bert Campaneris	Oakland Athletics	3	19
	Frank Chance	Chicago Cubs	3	20
	Frank Robinson	Cincinnati Reds; Baltimore Orioles	3	26
	Reggie Jackson	Oakland Athletics; New York Yankees	3	27
	Derek Jeter	New York Yankees	3	38
	Elston Howard	New York Yankees; Boston Red Sox	3	54
	Yogi Berra	New York Yankees	3	75

== Pitching ==
=== Earned run average ===
Minimum 35 innings pitched
#	Player	Team(s)	ERA	IP
1	Madison Bumgarner	San Francisco Giants	0.25	36
2	Sandy Koufax	Los Angeles Dodgers	0.95	57
3	Christy Mathewson	New York Giants	0.97	101 2/3
4	Mariano Rivera	New York Yankees	0.99	36 1/3
5	Monte Pearson	New York Yankees	1.01	35 2/3
6	Eddie Plank	Philadelphia Athletics	1.32	54 2/3
7	Bill Hallahan	St. Louis Cardinals	1.36	39 2/3
8	Orval Overall	Chicago Cubs	1.58	51 1/3
9	George Earnshaw	Philadelphia Athletics	1.58	62 2/3
10	Stan Coveleski	Cleveland Indians; Washington Senators	1.74	41 1/3

=== Walks and hits per inning pitched ===
Minimum 35 innings pitched
#	Player	Team(s)	WHIP	IP
1	Madison Bumgarner	San Francisco Giants	0.528	36
2	Monte Pearson	New York Yankees	0.729	35 2/3
3	Sandy Koufax	Los Angeles Dodgers	0.825	57
4	Christy Mathewson	New York Giants	0.846	101 2/3
5	Herb Pennock	Philadelphia Athletics; New York Yankees	0.849	55 1/3
6	Eddie Plank	Philadelphia Athletics	0.878	54 2/3
7	Deacon Phillippe	Pittsburgh Pirates	0.880	50
8	Bob Gibson	St. Louis Cardinals	0.889	81
9	George Earnshaw	Philadelphia Athletics	0.894	62 2/3
10	Curt Schilling	Philadelphia Phillies; Arizona Diamondbacks; Boston Red Sox	0.896	48

=== Innings pitched ===
#	Player	Team(s)	IP
1	Whitey Ford	New York Yankees	146
2	Christy Mathewson	New York Giants	101 2/3
3	Red Ruffing	New York Yankees	85 2/3
4	Chief Bender	Philadelphia Athletics	85
5	Waite Hoyt	New York Yankees; Philadelphia Athletics	83 2/3
6	Bob Gibson	St. Louis Cardinals	81
7	Art Nehf	New York Giants; Chicago Cubs	79
8	Andy Pettitte	New York Yankees; Houston Astros	77 2/3
9	Allie Reynolds	New York Yankees	77 1/3
10	Jim Palmer	Baltimore Orioles	64 2/3

=== Games pitched ===
#	Player	Team(s)	G
1	Mariano Rivera	New York Yankees	24
2	Whitey Ford	New York Yankees	22
3	Mike Stanton	Atlanta Braves; New York Yankees	20
4	Rollie Fingers	Oakland Athletics	16
	Jeff Nelson	New York Yankees	16
	Ryan Madson	Philadelphia Phillies; Kansas City Royals; Los Angeles Dodgers	16
7	Bob Turley	New York Yankees	15
	Allie Reynolds	New York Yankees	15
9	Clay Carroll	Cincinnati Reds	14
10	Andy Pettitte	New York Yankees; Houston Astros	13
	Mark Wohlers	Atlanta Braves	13
	Clem Labine	Brooklyn / Los Angeles Dodgers; Pittsburgh Pirates	13

=== Games started ===
#	Player	Team(s)	GS
1	Whitey Ford	New York Yankees	22
2	Andy Pettitte	New York Yankees; Houston Astros	13
3	Christy Mathewson	New York Giants	11
	Waite Hoyt	New York Yankees; Philadelphia Athletics	11
5	Red Ruffing	New York Yankees	10
	Chief Bender	Philadelphia Athletics	10
7	Bob Gibson	St. Louis Cardinals	9
	Art Nehf	New York Giants; Chicago Cubs	9
	Allie Reynolds	New York Yankees	9
	Catfish Hunter	Oakland Athletics; New York Yankees	9
	Justin Verlander	Detroit Tigers; Houston Astros	9

=== Complete games ===
#	Player	Team(s)	CG
1	Christy Mathewson	New York Giants	10
2	Chief Bender	Philadelphia Athletics	9
3	Red Ruffing	New York Yankees	8
	Bob Gibson	St. Louis Cardinals	8
5	Whitey Ford	New York Yankees	7
6	Waite Hoyt	New York Yankees; Philadelphia Athletics	6
	Art Nehf	New York Giants; Chicago Cubs	6
	George Mullin	Detroit Tigers	6
	Eddie Plank	Philadelphia Athletics	6
10	Allie Reynolds	New York Yankees	5
	George Earnshaw	Philadelphia Phillies	5
	Bullet Joe Bush	Philadelphia Athletics; Boston Red Sox; New York Yankees	5
	Mordecai Brown	Chicago Cubs	5
	Carl Mays	Boston Red Sox; New York Yankees	5
	Bill Donovan	Detroit Tigers	5
	Walter Johnson	Washington Senators	5
	Deacon Phillippe	Pittsburgh Pirates	5

=== Wins ===
#	Player	Team(s)	W
1	Whitey Ford	New York Yankees	10
2	Red Ruffing	New York Yankees	7
	Bob Gibson	St. Louis Cardinals	7
	Allie Reynolds	New York Yankees	7
5	Chief Bender	Philadelphia Athletics	6
	Waite Hoyt	New York Yankees; Philadelphia Athletics	6
	Lefty Gomez	Philadelphia Athletics	6
8	Christy Mathewson	New York Giants	5
	Andy Pettitte	New York Yankees; Houston Astros	5
	Catfish Hunter	Oakland Athletics; New York Yankees	5
	Vic Raschi	New York Yankees	5
	Mordecai Brown	Chicago Cubs	5
	Herb Pennock	Philadelphia Athletics; New York Yankees	5
	Jack Coombs	Philadelphia Athletics; Brooklyn Robins	5

=== Losses ===
#	Player	Team(s)	L
1	Whitey Ford	New York Yankees	8
2	Justin Verlander	Detroit Tigers; Houston Astros	6
3	Schoolboy Rowe	Detroit Tigers	5
	Bullet Joe Bush	Philadelphia Athletics; Boston Red Sox; New York Yankees	5
	Rube Marquard	New York Giants; Brooklyn Robins	5
	Christy Mathewson	New York Giants	5
	Eddie Plank	Philadelphia Athletics	5
9	Andy Pettitte	New York Yankees; Houston Astros	4
	Charlie Leibrandt	Kansas City Royals; Atlanta Braves	4
	Dave Stewart	Los Angeles Dodgers; Oakland Athletics; Toronto Blue Jays	4
	Ralph Terry	New York Yankees	4
	Don Newcombe	Brooklyn Dodgers	4
	Paul Derringer	St. Louis Cardinals; Cincinnati Reds; Chicago Cubs	4
	Bill Sherdel	St. Louis Cardinals	4
	Waite Hoyt	New York Yankees; Philadelphia Athletics	4
	Art Nehf	New York Giants; Chicago Cubs	4
	Burleigh Grimes	Brooklyn Robins; St. Louis Cardinals; Chicago Cubs	4
	Carl Mays	Boston Red Sox; New York Yankees	4
	Ed Summers	Detroit Tigers	4
	Bill Donovan	Detroit Tigers	4
	Mordecai Brown	Chicago Cubs	4
	Chief Bender	Philadelphia Athletics	4

=== Saves ===
#	Player	Team(s)	Sv
1	Mariano Rivera	New York Yankees	11
2	Rollie Fingers	Oakland Athletics	6
3	Allie Reynolds	New York Yankees	4
	Johnny Murphy	New York Yankees	4
	Robb Nen	Florida Marlins; San Francisco Giants	4
	John Wetteland	New York Yankees	4
7	Herb Pennock	Philadelphia Athletics; New York Yankees	3
	Tug McGraw	New York Mets; Philadelphia Phillies	3
	Firpo Marberry	Washington Senators; Detroit Tigers	3
	Todd Worrell	St. Louis Cardinals	3
	Will McEnaney	Cincinnati Reds	3
	Roy Face	Pittsburgh Pirates	3
	Kent Tekulve	Pittsburgh Pirates	3
	Neftalí Feliz	Texas Rangers	3
	Sergio Romo	San Francisco Giants	3
	Jonathan Papelbon	Boston Red Sox	3
	Troy Percival	Anaheim Angels	3

=== Shutouts ===
#	Player	Team(s)	SO
1	Christy Mathewson	New York Giants	4
2	Whitey Ford	New York Yankees	3
	Mordecai Brown	Chicago Cubs	3
4	Bob Gibson	St. Louis Cardinals	2
	Sandy Koufax	Los Angeles Dodgers	2
	Allie Reynolds	New York Yankees	2
	Art Nehf	New York Giants; Chicago Cubs	2
	Lew Burdette	Milwaukee Braves	2
	Bill Hallahan	St. Louis Cardinals	2
	Bill Dinneen	Boston Red Sox	2

=== Strikeouts ===
#	Player	Team(s)	Ks
1	Whitey Ford	New York Yankees	94
2	Bob Gibson	St. Louis Cardinals	92
3	Allie Reynolds	New York Yankees	62
4	Sandy Koufax	Los Angeles Dodgers	61
	Red Ruffing	New York Yankees	61
6	Chief Bender	Philadelphia Athletics	59
7	Andy Pettitte	New York Yankees; Houston Astros	56
	George Earnshaw	Philadelphia Athletics	56
9	John Smoltz	Atlanta Braves	52
10	Justin Verlander	Detroit Tigers; Houston Astros	50

=== Base on balls ===
#	Player	Team(s)	BB
1	Whitey Ford	New York Yankees	34
2	Allie Reynolds	New York Yankees	32
	Art Nehf	New York Giants; Chicago Cubs	32
4	Jim Palmer	Baltimore Orioles	31
5	Bob Turley	New York Yankees	29
6	Red Ruffing	New York Yankees	27
	Paul Derringer	St. Louis Cardinals; Cincinnati Reds; Chicago Cubs	27
8	Andy Pettitte	New York Yankees; Houston Astros	26
	Don Gullett	Cincinnati Reds; New York Yankees	26
	Burleigh Grimes	Brooklyn Robins; St. Louis Cardinals; Chicago Cubs	26

=== Hits allowed ===
#	Player	Team(s)	Hits allowed
1	Whitey Ford	New York Yankees	132
2	Andy Pettitte	New York Yankees; Houston Astros	83
3	Waite Hoyt	New York Yankees; Philadelphia Athletics	81
4	Christy Mathewson	New York Giants	75
5	Red Ruffing	New York Yankees	74
6	Chief Bender	Philadelphia Athletics	65
7	Allie Reynolds	New York Yankees	61
8	Catfish Hunter	Oakland Athletics; New York Yankees	57
9	Walter Johnson	Washington Senators	56
10	Don Sutton	Los Angeles Dodgers; Milwaukee Brewers	55
	Jim Palmer	Baltimore Orioles	55
	Bob Gibson	St. Louis Cardinals	55

=== Home runs allowed ===
#	Player	Team(s)	IP
1	Justin Verlander	Detroit Tigers; Houston Astros	10
2	Catfish Hunter	Oakland Athletics; New York Yankees	9
3	Tom Glavine	Atlanta Braves	8
	Gary Nolan	Cincinnati Reds	8
	Don Drysdale	Brooklyn / Los Angeles Dodgers	8
	Whitey Ford	New York Yankees	8
	Don Newcombe	Brooklyn Dodgers	8
	Allie Reynolds	New York Yankees	8
	Charlie Root	Chicago Cubs	8
	Burleigh Grimes	Brooklyn Robins; St. Louis Cardinals; Chicago Cubs	8

=== Hit batsmen ===
#	Player	Team(s)	HBP	Games pitched
1	Lance McCullers Jr.	Houston Astros	4	3
	Bill Donovan	Detroit Tigers	4	6
	Eddie Plank	Philadelphia Athletics	4	7
4	Bruce Kison	Pittsburgh Pirates	3	3
	José Contreras	New York Yankees; Chicago White Sox	3	5
	Jack Pfiester	Chicago Cubs	3	5
	Walter Johnson	Washington Senators	3	6
	George Mullin	Detroit Tigers	3	7
	Carl Mays	Boston Red Sox; New York Yankees	3	8
	Rollie Fingers	Oakland Athletics	3	16
	Whitey Ford	New York Yankees	3	22

=== Wild pitches ===
#	Player	Team(s)	WP	Games pitched
1	Hal Schumacher	New York Giants	5	5
2	Tyler Glasnow	Tampa Bay Rays	4	2
	Jack Morris	Detroit Tigers; Minnesota Twins; Toronto Blue Jays	4	7
	Jim Palmer	Baltimore Orioles	4	9
	Whitey Ford	New York Yankees	4	22
5	John Stuper	St. Louis Cardinals	3	2
	James Shields	Tampa Bay Rays; Kansas City Royals	3	3
	Vic Aldridge	Pittsburgh Pirates	3	4
	Jeff Pfeffer	Brooklyn Robins	3	4
	Steve Carlton	St. Louis Cardinals; Philadelphia Phillies	3	6
	Jeff Tesreau	New York Giants	3	6
	John Lackey	Anaheim Angels; Boston Red Sox; Chicago Cubs	3	7
	Dave McNally	Baltimore Orioles	3	9

== See also ==
- List of World Series champions
- List of Major League Baseball postseason records
