= 1976 Major League Baseball season =

1976 MLB season
- League: American League (AL); National League (NL)
- Sport: Baseball
- Duration: Regular season: April 8 – October 3, 1976; Postseason: October 9–21, 1976
- Games: 162
- Teams: 24 (12 per league)
- TV partner(s): ABC, NBC

Draft
- Top draft pick: Floyd Bannister
- Picked by: Houston Astros

Regular season
- Season MVP: AL: Thurman Munson (NYY); NL: Joe Morgan (CIN)

Postseason
- AL champions: New York Yankees
- AL runners-up: Kansas City Royals
- NL champions: Cincinnati Reds
- NL runners-up: Philadelphia Phillies

World Series
- Champions: Cincinnati Reds
- Runners-up: New York Yankees
- World Series MVP: Johnny Bench (CIN)

MLB seasons
- ← 1975 1977 →

Locations of teams for the 1976 American League season
West East
Locations of teams for the 1971–1976 National League seasons
West East

The 1976 major league baseball season began on April 8 while the regular season ended on October 3. The postseason began on October 9. In the third iteration of this World Series matchup, the 73rd World Series then began on October 16 and concluded on October 21 with the Cincinnati Reds of the National League sweeping the New York Yankees of the American League in four games, to win their fourth title in franchise history, their second consecutive title from the previous year. The Reds remain the only team to go undefeated in the postseason since the advent of the divisional era in 1969. This was the second time that the Yankees were swept in a World Series, the first having been by the Los Angeles Dodgers in the 1963 World Series.

The 47th All-Star Game was held on July 13 at Veterans Stadium in Philadelphia, Pennsylvania, home of the Philadelphia Phillies. The National League won, 7–1, and was the fifth win in what would be an 11-game win streak that lasted until 1983.

This was the last season of the expansion era (dating back to 1961) until 1993 in which the American League (AL) and the National League (NL) had the same number of teams. The following season would see the American grow to 14 teams, a reality that would exist until 2013 (albeit with teams shifting in and out of the league in the interim).

== Lockout ==
On March 1, 1976, a majority of AL and NL owners initiated a lockout following the expiration of the league's Basic Agreement, freezing baseball activity. Not every team owner took part in the lockout, such as the Chicago White Sox, and owners had various levels of strictness regarding freezing activity. A primary issue addressed during lockout negotiations was the longstanding reserve clause and the players' desire to have more freedom to become free agents. The reserve clause was effectively nullified following the Seitz decision on December 23, 1975, which declared that major league players became free agents upon playing one year for their team without a contract.

Following several proposals by team owners to institute an option year following eight, then six years of major league service time on March 2, the Major League Baseball Players Association (MLBPA), lead by Marvin Miller, rejected these proposals and argued for an option year after only one year of service time, colloquially dubbed the "one-one rule", the following day. After several meetings, counterproposals, and increasing tensions between the owners and the MLBPA, the ownership group gave a final offer which would include the MLBPA one-one rule on March 16. However, the Commissioner of Baseball, Bowie Kuhn ordered training camps to be opened immediately on March 17, which effectively ended the lockout, without an agreement in place between the ownership group and the MLBPA. Miller stated that the MLBPA did not vote on the owners' proposal because it did not address issues that were important to the players' union.

The season began on time for the scheduled April 8 Opening Day.

=== Aftermath ===
Several months after the lockout, the owners and the MLBPA reached an agreement which did not include the one-one rule in August, allowing players with six years of major-league service to become free agents.

== Schedule ==
The 1976 schedule consisted of 162 games for all teams in the American League and National League, each of which had 12 teams. Each league was split into two six-team divisions. Each team was scheduled to play 18 games against their five division rivals, totaling 90 games, and 12 games against six interdivision opponents, totaling 72 games. This continued the format put in place since the 1969 and was the last season to use the format by the American League due to the 1977 American League expansion, which saw an adjusted format due to an expansion to 14 teams. The National League would continue to use the 12-team format until 1993.

Opening Day took place on April 8, featuring four teams. The final day of the regular season was on October 3, featuring 20 teams. The National League Championship Series took place between October 9 and October 12, while the American League Championship Series took place between October 9 and October 14. The World Series took place between October 16 and October 21.

== Rule changes ==
The 1976 season saw the following rule changes:

- The experimental designated hitter (DH), which was implemented in the American League in 1973, was made permanent.
  - With the new permanent rules and questions regarding its implementation in the World Series, it was agreed that the DH would be used in even years.
  - It would not be used in All-Star Games (it would eventually be implemented in 1989 when American League teams hosted).
  - The National League (along with other minor leagues) could implement the DH by a simple majority as opposed to the previous three-quarter majority needed.
- Many rules were expanded upon or clarified:
  - Pitchers are only allowed to change positions during the same inning. The replacement/relief pitcher will be allowed five warm-up pitches.
  - If a pitcher comes in to relieve an existing pitcher immediately prior to game being suspended, and he has not allowed a baserunner before the end of the half inning, when the suspended game resumes and the pitcher does not start, it will be considered that the pitcher has been substituted and cannot be used for the remainder of the game.
  - A play will proceed even in the case of catcher's interference, to allow a manager to elect to take the play. If the batter misses first base or an existing runner misses the next base, the play will be treated as if the player reached the base.
  - If a runner advances to second base on ball four (forcing the batter to first base and the existing first base runner to second base), and the runner overruns second base, the fielding team has the opportunity to call him out should he not be touching a base when a tag is applied.
  - For an appeal to be considered made to an umpire, the player must clearly indicate either verbally or in an undeniable manner that an attempt to appeal is being made. However, if a fielder has the ball and is stepping on a base, an appeal cannot be made. When an appeal is being made, time is not out.
  - If the umpire calls a pitch a ball and the batter swings a half swing, the manager or catcher may request the plate umpire to ask a partner umpire for help on the call.
  - If a player of the visiting team is in the starting lineup and is substituted before being able to play defensively, he will receive no credit for any defensive statistics unless he actually played the position. However, all such players will be credited with a game played in batting statistics, so long as they are officially announced or listed in the starting lineup.
  - Regarding the calculation of earned run average (ERA) and innings pitched (IP) totals, the IP totals will round to the nearest whole number (such that, for example, 200 1/3 is rounded to 200 and 200 2/3 is rounded to 201.
- Specifications regarding materials on baseball bats were expanded to include pine tar.
- Shoes that have pointed spikes similar to that of track shoes or golf shoes are not allowed.
- Specifying that making intentional contact with an umpire is something a manager or player cannot do.
- Regarding a rule implemented in 1975 about players being ejected due to use of tampered bats, the rule was expanded to include batters using or attempting to use a baseball bat that has been altered or tampered for the purposes of improving the distance factor of the ball or adjusting the nature in which the ball leaves the bat after contact. No advancements on the bases will be made on the play and any and all outs made on the play will stand.

== Teams ==
League	Division	Team	City	Ballpark	Capacity	Manager
American League	East	Baltimore Orioles	Baltimore, Maryland	Baltimore Memorial Stadium	53,208	Earl Weaver
American League	East	Boston Red Sox	Boston, Massachusetts	Fenway Park	33,368	Darrell Johnson
American League	East	Boston Red Sox	Boston, Massachusetts	Fenway Park	33,368	Don Zimmer
American League	East	Cleveland Indians	Cleveland, Ohio	Cleveland Stadium	74,483	Frank Robinson
American League	East	Detroit Tigers	Detroit, Michigan	Tiger Stadium	52,806	Ralph Houk
American League	East	Milwaukee Brewers	Milwaukee, Wisconsin	Milwaukee County Stadium	53,192	Alex Grammas
American League	East	New York Yankees	New York, New York	Yankee Stadium	54,028	Billy Martin
American League	West	California Angels	Anaheim, California	Anaheim Stadium	43,500	Dick Williams
American League	West	California Angels	Anaheim, California	Anaheim Stadium	43,500	Norm Sherry
American League	West	Chicago White Sox	Chicago, Illinois	Comiskey Park	44,492	Paul Richards
American League	West	Kansas City Royals	Kansas City, Missouri	Royals Stadium	40,613	Whitey Herzog
American League	West	Minnesota Twins	Bloomington, Minnesota	Metropolitan Stadium	45,919	Gene Mauch
American League	West	Oakland Athletics	Oakland, California	Oakland–Alameda County Coliseum	50,000	Chuck Tanner
American League	West	Texas Rangers	Arlington, Texas	Arlington Stadium	35,649	Frank Lucchesi
National League	East	Chicago Cubs	Chicago, Illinois	Wrigley Field	37,702	Jim Marshall
National League	East	Montreal Expos	Montreal, Quebec	Jarry Park Stadium	29,125	Karl Kuehl
National League	East	Montreal Expos	Montreal, Quebec	Jarry Park Stadium	29,125	Charlie Fox
National League	East	New York Mets	New York, New York	Shea Stadium	55,300	Joe Frazier
National League	East	Philadelphia Phillies	Philadelphia, Pennsylvania	Veterans Stadium	62,382	Danny Ozark
National League	East	Pittsburgh Pirates	Pittsburgh, Pennsylvania	Three Rivers Stadium	58,722	Danny Murtaugh
National League	East	St. Louis Cardinals	St. Louis, Missouri	Civic Center Busch Memorial Stadium	53,138	Red Schoendienst
National League	West	Atlanta Braves	Atlanta, Georgia	Atlanta–Fulton County Stadium	51,556	Dave Bristol
National League	West	Cincinnati Reds	Cincinnati, Ohio	Riverfront Stadium	52,953	Sparky Anderson
National League	West	Houston Astros	Houston, Texas	Houston Astrodome	47,000	Bill Virdon
National League	West	Los Angeles Dodgers	Los Angeles, California	Dodger Stadium	56,000	Walter Alston
National League	West	Los Angeles Dodgers	Los Angeles, California	Dodger Stadium	56,000	Tommy Lasorda
National League	West	San Diego Padres	San Diego, California	San Diego Stadium	50,000	John McNamara
National League	West	San Francisco Giants	San Francisco, California	Candlestick Park	58,945	Bill Rigney

== Standings ==
=== American League ===
AL East
Team	W	L	Pct.	GB	Home	Road
New York Yankees	97	62	.610	—	45‍–‍35	52‍–‍27
Baltimore Orioles	88	74	.543	10½	42‍–‍39	46‍–‍35
Boston Red Sox	83	79	.512	15½	46‍–‍35	37‍–‍44
Cleveland Indians	81	78	.509	16	44‍–‍35	37‍–‍43
Detroit Tigers	74	87	.460	24	36‍–‍44	38‍–‍43
Milwaukee Brewers	66	95	.410	32	36‍–‍45	30‍–‍50

AL West
Team	W	L	Pct.	GB	Home	Road
Kansas City Royals	90	72	.556	—	49‍–‍32	41‍–‍40
Oakland Athletics	87	74	.540	2½	51‍–‍30	36‍–‍44
Minnesota Twins	85	77	.525	5	44‍–‍37	41‍–‍40
Texas Rangers	76	86	.469	14	39‍–‍42	37‍–‍44
California Angels	76	86	.469	14	38‍–‍43	38‍–‍43
Chicago White Sox	64	97	.398	25½	35‍–‍45	29‍–‍52

=== National League ===
NL East
Team	W	L	Pct.	GB	Home	Road
Philadelphia Phillies	101	61	.623	—	53‍–‍28	48‍–‍33
Pittsburgh Pirates	92	70	.568	9	47‍–‍34	45‍–‍36
New York Mets	86	76	.531	15	45‍–‍37	41‍–‍39
Chicago Cubs	75	87	.463	26	42‍–‍39	33‍–‍48
St. Louis Cardinals	72	90	.444	29	37‍–‍44	35‍–‍46
Montreal Expos	55	107	.340	46	27‍–‍53	28‍–‍54

NL West
Team	W	L	Pct.	GB	Home	Road
Cincinnati Reds	102	60	.630	—	49‍–‍32	53‍–‍28
Los Angeles Dodgers	92	70	.568	10	49‍–‍32	43‍–‍38
Houston Astros	80	82	.494	22	46‍–‍36	34‍–‍46
San Francisco Giants	74	88	.457	28	40‍–‍41	34‍–‍47
San Diego Padres	73	89	.451	29	42‍–‍38	31‍–‍51
Atlanta Braves	70	92	.432	32	34‍–‍47	36‍–‍45

== Postseason ==
The postseason began on October 9 and ended on October 21 with the Cincinnati Reds defeating the New York Yankees in the 1976 World Series in four games.

=== Bracket ===
League Championship Series (ALCS, NLCS)
East	NY Yankees	3
West	Kansas City	2
East	Philadelphia	0
West	Cincinnati	3

World Series
AL	NY Yankees	0
NL	Cincinnati	4

== Managerial changes ==
=== Off-season ===
Team	Former Manager	New Manager
Atlanta Braves	Connie Ryan	Dave Bristol
Chicago White Sox	Chuck Tanner	Paul Richards
Houston Astros	Preston Gómez	Bill Virdon
Milwaukee Brewers	Harvey Kuenn	Alex Grammas
Minnesota Twins	Frank Quilici	Gene Mauch
Montreal Expos	Gene Mauch	Karl Kuehl
New York Mets	Yogi Berra	Joe Frazier
Oakland Athletics	Alvin Dark	Chuck Tanner
San Francisco Giants	Wes Westrum	Bill Rigney
Texas Rangers	Billy Martin	Frank Lucchesi

=== In-season ===
Team	Former Manager	New Manager
Boston Red Sox	Darrell Johnson	Don Zimmer
California Angels	Dick Williams	Norm Sherry
Los Angeles Dodgers	Walter Alston	Tommy Lasorda
Montreal Expos	Karl Kuehl	Charlie Fox

== League leaders ==
=== American League ===
Hitting leaders
Stat	Player	Total
AVG	George Brett (KC)	.333
OPS	Hal McRae (KC)	.868
HR	Graig Nettles (NYY)	32
RBI	Lee May (BAL)	109
R	Roy White (NYY)	104
H	George Brett (KC)	215
SB	Billy North (OAK)	75

Pitching leaders
Stat	Player	Total
W	Jim Palmer (BAL)	22
L	Nolan Ryan (CAL)	18
ERA	Mark Fidrych (DET)	2.34
K	Nolan Ryan (CAL)	327
IP	Jim Palmer (BAL)	315.0
SV	Sparky Lyle (NYY)	23
WHIP	Frank Tanana (CAL)	0.988

=== National League ===
Hitting leaders
Stat	Player	Total
AVG	Bill Madlock (CHC)	.339
OPS	Joe Morgan (CIN)	1.020
HR	Mike Schmidt (PHI)	38
RBI	George Foster (CIN)	121
R	Pete Rose (CIN)	130
H	Pete Rose (CIN)	215
SB	Davey Lopes (LAD)	63

Pitching leaders
Stat	Player	Total
W	Randy Jones (SD)	22
L	Steve Rogers (MON); Dick Ruthven (ATL)	17
ERA	John Denny (STL)	2.52
K	Tom Seaver (NYM)	235
IP	Randy Jones (SD)	315.1
SV	Rawly Eastwick (CIN)	26
WHIP	Randy Jones (SD)	1.027

== Milestones ==
=== Batters ===
==== Four home runs in one game ====
- Mike Schmidt (PHI):
  - Became the tenth player to hit four home runs in one game in a 18–16 win against the Chicago Cubs on April 17.

==== Cycles ====
- Tim Foli (MON):
  - Foli hit for his first cycle, first in franchise history, and 10th natural cycle in major league history, on April 21 against the Chicago Cubs. The game was suspended on account of darkness and continued the following day, when Foli hit the home run that completed the cycle.
- Larry Hisle (MIN):
  - Hisle hit for his first cycle and seventh in franchise history, on June 4 against the Baltimore Orioles.
- Mike Phillips (NYM):
  - Phillips hit for his first cycle and third in franchise history, on June 25 against the Chicago Cubs.
- Lyman Bostock (MIN):
  - Bostock hit for his first cycle and eighth in franchise history, on July 24 against the Chicago White Sox.
- César Cedeño (HOU):
  - Cedeño hit for his second cycle and second in franchise history, on August 9 against the St. Louis Cardinals.
- Mike Hegan (MIL):
  - Hegan hit for his first cycle and first in franchise history, on September 3 against the Detroit Tigers.

==== Other batting accomplishments ====
- Darrell Evans (SF/ATL):
  - Broke a National League record as a part of the Atlanta Braves on April 25 when he walked in his 13th consecutive game against in a game against the Philadelphia Phillies. He sets the record on April 27 when he walked in his 15th consecutive game in a game against the New York Mets, having drawn 19 walks in the 15th game-streak.
- Reggie Jackson (BAL):
  - Tied an American League record by becoming the sixth player to hit home runs in six consecutive games between July 18 and 23.
- Willie Davis (SD):
  - Gets his 2,500th hit with a single in the fourth inning against the Chicago Cubs on July 19.
- Hank Aaron (MIL):
  - Set a major league record for most career home runs, hitting his 755th home run on July 20 against the California Angels.
- Carl Yastrzemski (BOS):
  - Gets his 2,500th hit with a double in the first inning against the Cleveland Indians on July 26.
- Minnie Miñoso (CWS):
  - After coming out of a twelve-year retirement on September 11, he becomes the oldest player to get a hit in a major league game when he gets a hit in the second inning against the California Angels.
- Joe Morgan (CIN):
  - Recorded his 500th career stolen base in the first inning against the Los Angeles Dodgers on September 14. He became the 24th player to reach this mark.

=== Pitchers ===
==== No-hitters ====
- Larry Dierker (HOU):
  - Dierker threw his first career no-hitter and fifth no-hitter in franchise history, by defeating the Montreal Expos 6–0 on July 9. Dierker walked four and struck out eight.
- Blue Moon Odom / Francisco Barrios (CWS):
  - The two pitchers combined to throw the 13th no-hitter in franchise history, by defeating the Oakland Athletics 2–1 on July 28. It was accomplished with five strikeouts and 11 walks. Odom pitched the first five innings. It is the fourth combined no-hitter in major league history.
- John Candelaria (PIT):
  - Candelaria threw his first career no-hitter and fifth no-hitter in franchise history, by defeating the Los Angeles Dodgers 2–0 on August 9. Candelaria walked one and struck out seven.
- John Montefusco (SF):
  - Montefusco threw his first career no-hitter and 12th no-hitter in franchise history, by defeating the Atlanta Braves 9–0 on September 29. Montefusco walked one and struck out four.

==== Other pitching accomplishments ====
- Randy Jones (SD):
  - Ties a National League record previously set by Christy Mathewson in 1913 by going 68 innings without a base on balls against San Francisco Giants on June 22. The streak ends when he walks Marc Hill leading off the 8th.

=== Miscellaneous ===
- Toby Harrah (TEX)
  - Becomes the only shortstop in major league history to play an entire doubleheader without a fielding chance against the Chicago White Sox on June 25.

== Awards and honors ==
=== Regular season ===
Baseball Writers' Association of America Awards
BBWAA Award	National League	American League
Rookie of the Year	Butch Metzger (SD); Pat Zachry (CIN)	Mark Fidrych (DET)
Cy Young Award	Randy Jones (SD)	Jim Palmer (BAL)
Most Valuable Player	Joe Morgan (CIN)	Thurman Munson (NYY)
Babe Ruth Award (World Series MVP)	Johnny Bench (CIN)	—
Gold Glove Awards
Position	National League	American League
Pitcher	Jim Kaat (PHI)	Jim Palmer (BAL)
Catcher	Johnny Bench (CIN)	Jim Sundberg (TEX)
1st Base	Steve Garvey (LAD)	George Scott (MIL)
2nd Base	Joe Morgan (CIN)	Bobby Grich (BAL)
3rd Base	Mike Schmidt (PHI)	Aurelio Rodríguez (DET)
Shortstop	Dave Concepción (CIN)	Mark Belanger (BAL)
Outfield	César Cedeño (HOU)	Dwight Evans (BOS)
Outfield	César Gerónimo (CIN)	Rick Manning (CLE)
Outfield	Garry Maddox (PHI)	Joe Rudi (OAK)

=== Other awards ===
- Outstanding Designated Hitter Award: Hal McRae (KC)
- Roberto Clemente Award (Humanitarian): Pete Rose (CIN)
- Hutch Award: Tommy John (LAD)
- Rolaids Relief Man Award: Rawly Eastwick (CIN, National); Bill Campbell (MIN, American)
- Sport Magazine's World Series Most Valuable Player Award: Johnny Bench (CIN)

The Sporting News Awards
Award	National League	American League
Player of the Year	Joe Morgan (CIN)	—
Pitcher of the Year	Randy Jones (SD)	Jim Palmer (BAL)
Fireman of the Year (Relief pitcher)	Rawly Eastwick (CIN)	Bill Campbell (MIN)
Rookie Player of the Year	Larry Herndon (SF)	Butch Wynegar (MIN)
Rookie Pitcher of the Year	Butch Metzger (SD)	Mark Fidrych (DET)
Comeback Player of the Year	Tommy John (LAD)	Dock Ellis (NYY)
Manager of the Year	Danny Ozark (PHI)	—
Executive of the Year	—	Joe Burke (KC)

=== Monthly awards ===
==== Player of the Month ====
Month	National League	American League
April	Mike Schmidt (PHI)	Willie Horton (DET)
May	George Foster (CIN)	Ron LeFlore (DET)
June	Al Oliver (CIN)	Mark Fidrych (DET)
July	George Foster (CIN)	Reggie Jackson (BAL)
August	Joe Morgan (CIN)	Luis Tiant (BOS)
September	Steve Garvey (LAD)	Nolan Ryan (CAL); Frank Tanana (CAL)

==== Pitcher of the Month ====
Month	National League
April	Randy Jones (SD)
May	Randy Jones (SD)
June	Andy Messersmith (ATL)
July	Jerry Koosman (NYM)
August	Ray Burris (CHC)
September	Don Sutton (LAD)

=== Baseball Hall of Fame ===
- Oscar Charleston
- Roger Connor
- Bob Lemon
- Freddie Lindstrom
- Robin Roberts
- Cal Hubbard (umpire)

== Home field attendance ==
Team name	Wins	%±	Home attendance	%±	Per game
Cincinnati Reds	102	−5.6%	2,629,708	13.6%	32,466
Philadelphia Phillies	101	17.4%	2,480,150	29.9%	30,619
Los Angeles Dodgers	92	4.5%	2,386,301	−6.0%	29,461
New York Yankees	97	16.9%	2,012,434	56.2%	25,155
Boston Red Sox	83	−12.6%	1,895,846	8.4%	23,406
Kansas City Royals	90	−1.1%	1,680,265	45.9%	20,744
New York Mets	86	4.9%	1,468,754	−15.1%	17,912
Detroit Tigers	74	29.8%	1,467,020	38.6%	18,338
San Diego Padres	73	2.8%	1,458,478	13.8%	18,231
St. Louis Cardinals	72	−12.2%	1,207,079	−28.8%	14,902
Texas Rangers	76	−3.8%	1,164,982	3.3%	14,382
Baltimore Orioles	88	−2.2%	1,058,609	5.6%	13,069
Chicago Cubs	75	0.0%	1,026,217	−0.8%	12,669
Pittsburgh Pirates	92	0.0%	1,025,945	−19.2%	12,666
Milwaukee Brewers	66	−2.9%	1,012,164	−16.6%	12,496
California Angels	76	5.6%	1,006,774	−4.9%	12,429
Cleveland Indians	81	2.5%	948,776	−2.9%	12,010
Chicago White Sox	64	−14.7%	914,945	21.9%	11,437
Houston Astros	80	25.0%	886,146	3.3%	10,807
Atlanta Braves	70	4.5%	818,179	53.0%	10,101
Oakland Athletics	87	−11.2%	780,593	−27.4%	9,637
Minnesota Twins	85	11.8%	715,394	−3.0%	8,832
Montreal Expos	55	−26.7%	646,704	−28.8%	8,084
San Francisco Giants	74	−7.5%	626,868	19.9%	7,739

== Venues ==
Two ballparks were renamed by the start of the season:

- Atlanta Stadium, home of the Atlanta Braves, was renamed to Atlanta–Fulton County Stadium.
- White Sox Park, home of the Chicago White Sox, was renamed to Comiskey Park.

The New York Yankees returned to their longtime home of Yankee Stadium following renovations that caused them to play at their cross-town rival New York Mets' home ballpark of Shea Stadium for two season.

The Montreal Expos would play their final game at Jarry Park Stadium in a doubleheader on September 26 against the Philadelphia Phillies, moving into Olympic Stadium for the start of the 1977 season.

== Media ==
=== Television ===
This was the first season of MLB's new national TV rights agreements with ABC and NBC. ABC won the rights to show Monday Night Baseball, the All-Star Game and both League Championship Series in even-numbered years, and World Series in odd-numbered years. NBC continued to air the weekend Game of the Week, as well as All-Star Game and both League Championship Series in odd-numbered years, and World Series in even-numbered years.

This was the final year NBC used radio announcers of the two competing teams in the World Series (in 1976, Cincinnati Reds radio announcer Marty Brenneman and New York Yankees announcer Phil Rizzuto were used) as part of the television broadcast team. Starting in 1978 when NBC had the World Series again, they used their standard broadcast team of Joe Garagiola and Tony Kubek with no team announcers as part of the coverage.

== Retired numbers ==
- Nellie Fox had his No. 2 retired by the Chicago White Sox on May 1. This was the second number retired by the team.
- Hank Aaron had his No. 44 retired by the Milwaukee Brewers on October 3. This was the first number retired by the team.

== See also ==
- 1976 in baseball (Events, Movies, Births, Deaths)
- 1976 Nippon Professional Baseball season
