= 1976 National League Championship Series =

8th edition of Major League Baseball's National League Championship Series

Team (Wins)	Managers	Season
Cincinnati Reds (3)	Sparky Anderson	102–60, .630, GA: 10
Philadelphia Phillies (0)	Danny Ozark	101–61, .623, GA: 9
- Dates: October 9–12
- Umpires: Ed Sudol (crew chief); Jerry Dale; Dick Stello; Ed Vargo; Doug Harvey; Terry Tata

Broadcast
- Television: ABC; WLWT (CIN); WPHL-TV (PHI)
- TV announcers: ABC: Al Michaels, Warner Wolf and Tom Seaver; WLWT: Ken Coleman and Bill Brown; WPHL-TV: Harry Kalas, Richie Ashburn and Andy Musser
- Radio: CBS
- Radio announcers: Ralph Kiner and Jerry Coleman

The 1976 National League Championship Series was a postseason series in Major League Baseball’s 1976 postseason between the two division champions of the National League in the Cincinnati Reds and the Philadelphia Phillies. This was the eighth NLCS held in baseball history. For the fourth time in seven seasons, the Reds won the best-of-five series to reach the World Series. They did so in a three-game sweep, winning easily in the first two games before ending the series in their last at bat in Game 3.

Stars of the series for the Reds included batters Johnny Bench (4 for 12, HR), Dave Concepción (4 runs scored), George Foster (2 H, both home runs), Ken Griffey (5 for 13, triple), Pete Rose (6 for 14, 2 RBIs, 3 runs scored), and pitchers Don Gullett (win, 8 IP, 2 hits), Pedro Borbón (4 1/3 IP, 0.00 ERA), and Pat Zachry (win, 5 IP, 3 SO).

== Summary ==
=== Cincinnati Reds vs. Philadelphia Phillies ===
Cincinnati won the series, 3–0.

Game	Date	Score	Location	Time	Attendance
1	October 9	Cincinnati Reds – 6, Philadelphia Phillies – 3	Veterans Stadium	2:39	62,640
2	October 10	Cincinnati Reds – 6, Philadelphia Phillies – 2	Veterans Stadium	2:24	62,651
3	October 12	Philadelphia Phillies – 6, Cincinnati Reds – 7	Riverfront Stadium	2:43	55,047

== Game summaries ==
=== Game 1 ===
October 9, 1976 8:15 pm (ET) at Veterans Stadium in Philadelphia, Pennsylvania 55 °F (13 °C) partly cloudy
Team	1	2	3	4	5	6	7	8	9	R	H	E
Cincinnati	0	0	1	0	0	2	0	3	0	6	10	0
Philadelphia	1	0	0	0	0	0	0	0	2	3	6	1
WP: Don Gullett (1–0) LP: Steve Carlton (0–1); Home runs: CIN: George Foster (1); PHI: None

Reds starter Don Gullett held the Phils to two hits in eight strong innings, but allowed them to score first when Dave Cash hit a leadoff double, moved to third on a groundout and scored on Mike Schmidt's sacrifice fly. Gullett then walked three to load the bases, but got Tim McCarver to fly out to end the inning. The Reds tied the game in the third on Tony Perez's sacrifice fly off Steve Carlton, then took the lead in the sixth on George Foster's home run. After a double and error put two on, Gullett's RBI single made it 3–1 Reds. After allowing a leadoff double and walk in the eighth, Carlton was replaced by Tug McGraw, who allowed a one-out two-run double to Gullett and RBI double to Pete Rose. The Phillies attempted to rally in the ninth off Rawly Eastwick. Garry Maddox hit a leadoff single and scored on Greg Luzinski's double. After Dick Allen singled, Jay Johnstone's RBI single made it 6–3 Reds, but Eastwick retired the next two batters to end the game and give the Reds a 1–0 series lead.

=== Game 2 ===
October 10, 1976 3:15 pm (ET) at Veterans Stadium in Philadelphia, Pennsylvania 59 °F (15 °C) partly cloudy
Team	1	2	3	4	5	6	7	8	9	R	H	E
Cincinnati	0	0	0	0	0	4	2	0	0	6	6	0
Philadelphia	0	1	0	0	1	0	0	0	0	2	10	1
WP: Pat Zachry (1–0) LP: Jim Lonborg (0–1) Sv: Pedro Borbón (1); Home runs: CIN: None; PHI: Greg Luzinski (1)

Buoyed by an RBI single by Bob Boone in the second after two leadoff singles and a homer by Greg Luzinski in the fifth off Pat Zachry, Phils starter Jim Lonborg no-hit the Reds until the sixth. After giving up a leadoff walk, one-out RBI single to Pete Rose, followed by another single by Ken Griffey, Lonborg was removed from the game by manager Danny Ozark. Gene Garber came in relief and after an intentional walk loaded the bases, two runs came across on an error by first baseman Dick Allen on a ball hit by Tony Pérez, then George Foster's RBI groundout made it 4–2 Reds. They added to their lead next inning on Griffey's RBI single off Tug McGraw and Perez's sacrifice fly off Ron Reed. Pedro Borbon pitched the last four innings to close to give the Reds a 2–0 series lead heading home.

=== Game 3 ===
October 12, 1976 3:15 pm (ET) at Riverfront Stadium in Cincinnati, Ohio 73 °F (23 °C) clear
Team	1	2	3	4	5	6	7	8	9	R	H	E
Philadelphia	0	0	0	1	0	0	2	2	1	6	11	0
Cincinnati	0	0	0	0	0	0	4	0	3	7	9	2
WP: Rawly Eastwick (1–0) LP: Gene Garber (0–1); Home runs: PHI: None; CIN: George Foster (2), Johnny Bench (1)

Once again, the Phillies got a strong starting pitching performance that went for naught. Jim Kaat held the Reds to one hit after six innings. Meanwhile, his teammates provided him a 3–0 lead via a consecutive doubles in the fourth by Mike Schmidt and Greg Luzinski off Gary Nolan and RBI doubles by Garry Maddox and Schmidt in the seventh after a leadoff walk off Manny Sarmiento.

But in the bottom of the seventh, Kaat began to lose it. Ken Griffey led off with a single, Joe Morgan walked. Ron Reed then replaced Kaat to face Tony Pérez, who promptly singled home Griffey. George Foster followed with a sacrifice fly. After a walk to Johnny Bench, Reed retired Dave Concepción, but then surrendered a two-run triple to César Gerónimo to put the Reds ahead 4–3.

In the eighth, the Phillies rallied against Reds closer Rawly Eastwick. Jay Johnstone led off with a double and went to third on a wild pitch as Bob Boone walked. Larry Bowa doubled in Johnstone and Dave Cash hit a sacrifice fly to give the Phillies the lead at 5–4. The Phillies added another run in the top of the ninth on an RBI triple by Johnstone to make it 6–4.

With Reed still on the mound in the ninth, Foster and Bench hit back-to-back homers to tie the game. Gene Garber relieved and promptly gave up a single to Concepción. Tom Underwood came on to surrender a walk to Geronimo. Pinch-hitter Ed Armbrister sacrificed the runners to second and third. Underwood then intentionally walked Pete Rose to load the bases. With the infield drawn in, Griffey hit a high bouncer toward Bobby Tolan playing first. Tolan charged, but the ball got past him and Concepción scored to send the Reds to their second straight World Series; they would sweep the Yankees in four games, becoming the only team in the divisional era (to date) to go undefeated in the postseason.

== Composite box ==
1976 NLCS (3–0): Cincinnati Reds over Philadelphia Phillies

Team	1	2	3	4	5	6	7	8	9	R	H	E
Cincinnati Reds	0	0	1	0	0	6	6	3	3	19	25	2
Philadelphia Phillies	1	1	0	1	1	0	2	2	3	11	27	2
Total attendance: 180,338 Average attendance: 60,113

== Aftermath ==
In the next couple of seasons, the Phillies would make free agent moves modeled on players that happened to have played for the Big Red Machine. Pete Rose was signed before the start of the 1979 season, and Tony Perez and Joe Morgan were signed in the 1982–1983 off-season. With Rose and others in the 1980 campaign, the Phillies won the World Series. By 1983, Rose was 42, Perez was 41, and Morgan was 39. Overall, the 1983 Phillies were one of the oldest teams ever assembled, being affectionately nicknamed "Wheeze Kids" due to the numerous veteran players on the team. The team started 43–42 before firing manager Pat Corrales and finished 47–30 under Paul Owens to win a relatively weak National League East with just 90 wins. In the playoffs, they defeated the Los Angeles Dodgers in the National League Championship Series in four games, before losing the World Series to the Baltimore Orioles in five games.

Despite the team's success, Rose and Morgan had near career-worst seasons. Morgan hit .230 in his lone season with the Phillies. The 42-year-old Rose batted only .245 with 121 hits and found himself benched during the latter part of the 1983 season when he appeared periodically to play and pinch hit. Rose did blossom as a pinch-hitter, with eight hits in 22 at-bats, a .364 average. Rose was even benched for game three of the World Series in Philadelphia, the first and only postseason game he did not start in his career.

The Phillies later defeated the Reds in the 2010 National League Division Series. In Game 1 of the series, Roy Halladay pitched the second postseason no-hitter in MLB history.
