= Walt Judnich =

American baseball player (1916–1971)

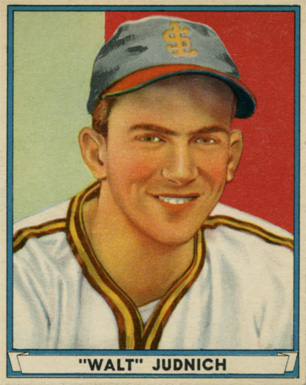
- Center fielder
- Born: January 24, 1916; San Francisco, California, U.S.
- Died: July 10, 1971 (aged 55); Glendale, California, U.S.
- Batted: Left Threw: Left

MLB debut
- April 16, 1940, for the St. Louis Browns

Last MLB appearance
- May 12, 1949, for the Pittsburgh Pirates

MLB statistics
- Batting average: .281
- Home runs: 90
- Runs batted in: 420
- Stats at Baseball Reference

Teams
- St. Louis Browns (1940–1942, 1946–1947); Cleveland Indians (1948); Pittsburgh Pirates (1949)

Career highlights and awards
- World Series champion (1948)

Walter Franklin Judnich (January 24, 1916 – July 10, 1971) was an American professional baseball player. A center fielder, Judnich played in Major League Baseball (MLB) for seven seasons with the St. Louis Browns, Cleveland Indians, and Pittsburgh Pirates. In 790 career games, Judnich recorded a batting average of .281 and accumulated 90 home runs and 420 runs batted in (RBI).

Born in San Francisco, California, Judnich began his career with the New York Yankees, spending five seasons in the organization. The St. Louis Browns acquired him in 1940 and he was plugged into the starting lineup. He was the starting center fielder for three seasons. After the 1942 season, he joined the United States Army Air Forces to serve in World War II. When he returned to baseball in 1946, he was no longer an everyday player, and in 1947 the Browns turned him into a first baseman. He was traded to the Cleveland Indians in 1948, where he served as a utility player and was a member of the 1948 World Series champions. He was sent to the Pittsburgh Pirates in 1949, then spent the next six seasons in the Pacific Coast League before retiring from the game in 1955.

== Early life and career ==
Born and raised in San Francisco, California, Judnich grew up wanting to be a baseball player, playing semi-pro baseball on a team sponsored by the Mission Reds. He graduated from Mission High School in 1935, and signed with the New York Yankees organization by Yankees scout Joe Devine after participating in a baseball training camp in Oakland, which included future MLB players Tiny Bonham and Len Gabrielson. Judnich spent the 1935 season with the Class C Akron Yankees, where he had a .274 batting average in 109 games. The following year, he played for the Class B Norfolk Tars, and hit .303 with 24 home runs in 143 games. In 1937, he was again promoted to the Oakland Oaks of the Pacific Coast League (PCL), where he hit .316 with 14 triples in 175 games. Judnich spent 1938 with the Kansas City Blues of the American Association, and hit .273 in 150 games. Judnich played for the Newark Bears of the International League in 1939, and had a .284 batting average. Before the 1940 season began, Judnich was sold to the St. Louis Browns after not being offered a major league contract; as the Yankees had Joe DiMaggio as an everyday center fielder, Judnich was considered expendable.

== St. Louis Browns and military service ==
Judnich entered the major leagues in 1940 with the Browns, and after impressing the Browns in spring training, made his major league debut on April 16. By the halfway point of the season, he was being touted as a future star by manager Fred Haney thanks to his ability to hit home runs as well as his hitting in the clutch. In his rookie season with the Browns, Judnich had 24 home runs, 89 RBIs, 7 triples, and 97 runs scored, all of which would end up being career highs. He also had a .303 batting average in 137 games, which included a batting average of .360 after the All-Star Game, and finished 18th in Most Valuable Player (MVP) voting with six votes.

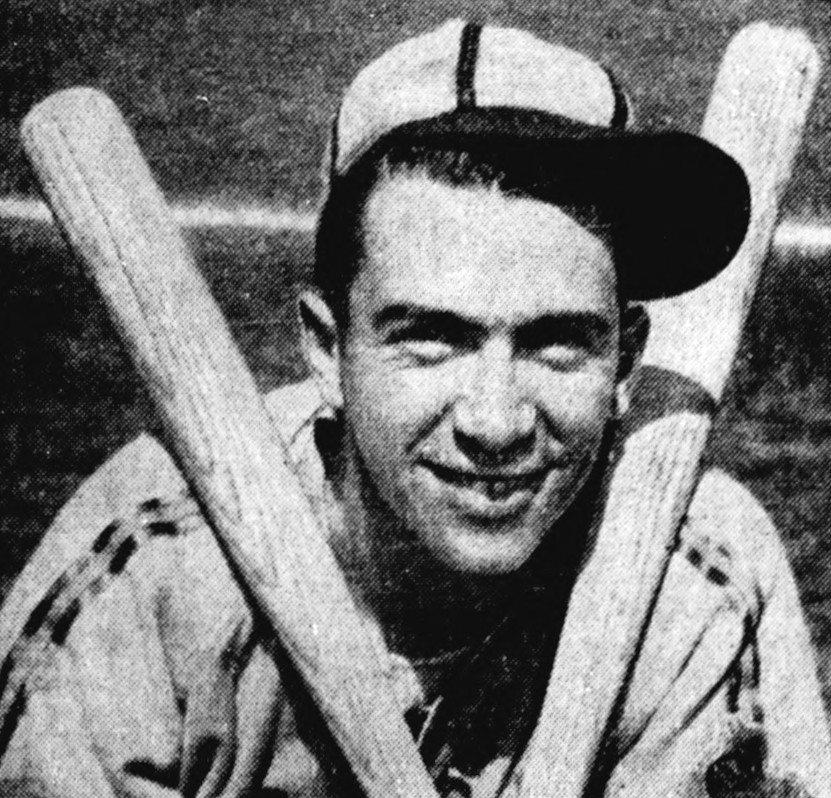
Judnich, circa 1941

In 1941, Judnich started off the season in a slump, and partway through the season he had a batting average under .200. He remained in the starting lineup for the Browns and rebounded by the end of the season, finishing with a .284 batting average, 14 homers, 40 doubles, and 83 RBIs in a career-high 146 games. Judnich remained as the starting center fielder for 1942. His performance for the season included hitting two home runs and five RBIs in a 9–0 win against the New York Yankees on September 10. For the season, he hit 17 home runs, seventh in the American League, with 82 RBIs and a .313 average, a career-high. He was one of only seven players in the American League to reach the .300 mark in the season, and was the only Browns player to do so. Judnich also finished 16th in MVP voting with 14 votes.

In March 1943, Judnich was called to serve in the military for World War II. He was married in June 1941, but passed on deferment to enlist. He served in the United States Army Air Forces and was stationed at McClellan Field, where he was certified as a marksman and promoted to corporal in October. He also took part in an Army-Navy baseball game and a benefit game against players from the Pacific Coast League, which raised $25,000 (equivalent to $465,144 in 2025) for the servicemen. The following year, he was transferred alongside Joe DiMaggio to Hickam Field in Hawaii, and also played for the Seventh Air Force baseball team. In one exhibition game, Judnich hit five consecutive home runs and 12 RBIs in a 30–2 victory for his team. He spent 1945 stationed at Camp Beale in California before being discharged on November 30.

Judnich returned to the starting lineup for the 1946 St. Louis Browns season, but he did not have the same power as he did before military service. In July, manager Luke Sewell benched Judnich for Al Zarilla for a few games in an attempt to reverse Judnich's struggles. He finished the season with a .262 batting average, 15 home runs and 72 RBIs in 132 games, but did perform better in night games, where he had a .309 batting average. In 1947, new Browns manager Muddy Ruel converted Judnich's position to first baseman in an attempt to get Paul Lehner, the team's other center fielder, in the lineup every day. Judnich played nearly every day as well, despite disliking playing first base and preferring to play in the outfield, only missing a few games to return home to witness the birth of his son. He finished the season with a .258 batting average, 18 home runs, and 64 RBIs in 144 appearances.

== Later life and career ==
On November 20, 1947, the Browns traded Judnich and Bob Muncrief to the Cleveland Indians for $25,000, Joe Frazier, Dick Kokos, and Bryan Stephens. Originally projected to be the starting center fielder, the acquisition of Thurman Tucker later that offseason led to Judnich becoming a utility player. He split time between center field, right field, and first base, backing up Tucker, Allie Clark, and Eddie Robinson, respectively, depending on the pitching matchup on a given day. In 79 games, Judnich hit .257 with two home runs and 29 RBIs. In the 1948 World Series, he hit .077 (1-for-13) with a run and one RBI in four games. On February 9, 1949, the Pittsburgh Pirates purchased Judnich's contract from the Indians to give them extra depth at first base, and he started the season on the major league roster as a result. He only played in ten games for the Pirates, hitting .229, and in May his contract was sold to the San Francisco Seals of the PCL, ending his major league career.

Judnich spent the rest of 1949 with the Seals, and had a .269 batting average and 18 home runs in 116 games. In 1950, he joined the Seattle Rainiers. In 166 games, Judnich had a .285 batting average with 19 home runs and 84 RBIs. Judnich got off to a hot start for Seattle in 1951, and after the first two months of the season he had a .381 batting average, which led the Pacific Coast League. In 147 games, Judnich had a .329 batting average with 21 home runs and 102 RBIs, en route to Seattle winning the Pacific Coast League championship. While a member of the Rainiers, he spent the winter playing for the Leones de Ponce in Puerto Rico. Judnich returned to the Rainiers in 1952, finishing the season with a .287 batting average, 15 home runs, and 105 RBIs in 177 games, and he followed that up in 1953 with a .298 average, 16 home runs, and 101 RBIs in 147 games.

After the 1953 season, the Portland Beavers purchased Judnich's contract from Seattle, as Seattle was looking to keep their team young and replace the 37-year old. In 156 games for Portland, he hit .272 with 18 home runs and 81 RBIs. Judnich began the following season with Portland, and played in 25 games before his contract was sold to the San Francisco Seals, where he had a .282 average in 112 games. After the season, the Seals sent Judnich to the Louisville Colonels, but Judnich did not want to leave the west coast, and refused the move, retiring from baseball as a result.

After retiring from professional baseball, Judnich moved to Glendale, California, where he lived with his wife and three children. He led a relatively quiet life; when asked of hobbies or interests, he stated during his career, "our fans here aren't interested in those things." He died at the age of 55, and was interred at Grand View Memorial Park Cemetery in Glendale. His ashes were later relocated to Bayou Meto Cemetery in Jacksonville, Arkansas, which is his wife's hometown.
