= Bryan Stephens =

American baseball player (1920–1991)

- Pitcher
- Born: July 14, 1920; Fayetteville, Arkansas, U.S.
- Died: November 21, 1991 (aged 71); Santa Ana, California, U.S.
- Batted: Right Threw: Right

MLB debut
- May 15, 1947, for the Cleveland Indians

Last MLB appearance
- September 26, 1948, for the St. Louis Browns

MLB statistics
- Win–loss record: 8–16
- Earned run average: 5.16
- Strikeouts: 69
- Stats at Baseball Reference

Teams
- Cleveland Indians (1947); St. Louis Browns (1948)

Bryan Maris Stephens (July 14, 1920 – November 21, 1991) was an American professional baseball player. The native of Fayetteville, Arkansas, a right-handed pitcher, appeared in 74 Major League games — 31 for the 1947 Cleveland Indians and 43 for the 1948 St. Louis Browns. He stood 6 feet 4 inches (1.93 m) tall and weighed 175 pounds (79 kg).

Stephens attended Washington High School in Los Angeles County, California, and signed with the Detroit Tigers in 1939. The following season he was acquired by the Indians and spent 1940–1942 in their farm system, winning 20 of 24 decisions in 1942 for the Class B Cedar Rapids Raiders of the Illinois–Indiana–Iowa League. He then missed the 1943–1945 seasons while serving in the United States Army during World War II. After one more year of minor league seasoning in 1946, Stephens made the 1947 Indians' roster.

In his first Major League appearance, as a starting pitcher on May 15 against the Washington Senators at Griffith Stadium, Stephens scattered eight hits, all singles, in a complete game, 9–1 triumph over eventual Baseball Hall of Fame pitcher Early Wynn. Sent to the bullpen by manager Lou Boudreau, Stephens then went over a month before his next starting assignment — again at Washington and against Wynn. This time, on June 19, Stephens took the loss, 3–2, and left for a pinch hitter after the fifth inning. Altogether, he made five starts for Cleveland was used exclusively as a relief pitcher after July 15. He fashioned a 5–10 win–loss mark and a 4.01 earned run average, with one save, in 92 innings pitched for the Indians.

Stephens was traded on November 20, 1947, with $25,000, Joe Frazier, and Dick Kokos for Walt Judnich and Bob Muncrief. Stephens worked out of the bullpen early in the 1948 season before making six successive starts during June; however, he lost his first four decisions before throwing another complete game, a 9–6 win over the Boston Red Sox at Sportsman's Park, winning the game himself by driving in three runs with an eighth-inning double off Mel Parnell. (Bryan Stephens was one of three players with a similar surname who played in that game, including Boston's Vern Stephens and the Browns' first baseman, Chuck Stevens.) But Bryan Stephens' year with the Browns had few bright spots: he collected three saves and posted three wins, against six losses, with a poor 6.02 earned run average in 122 2/3 innings pitched. He spent the next two seasons, his last as a professional, in the minors.

All told, Stephens allowed 220 hits and 106 bases on balls in 214 2/3 Major League innings pitched, with 69 strikeouts.

Stephens died on November 21, 1991 at the age of 71. He was interred at Pacific View Memorial Park.
