= Mike Goliat =

American baseball player (1921-2004)

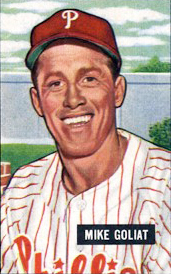
- Goliat's 1951 Bowman Gum baseball card
- Second baseman
- Born: November 5, 1921; Yatesboro, Pennsylvania, U.S.
- Died: January 13, 2004 (aged 82); Seven Hills, Ohio, U.S.
- Batted: Right Threw: Right

MLB debut
- August 3, 1949, for the Philadelphia Phillies

Last MLB appearance
- April 27, 1952, for the St. Louis Browns

MLB statistics
- Batting average: .225
- Home runs: 20
- Runs batted in: 99
- Stats at Baseball Reference

Teams
- Philadelphia Phillies (1949–1951); St. Louis Browns (1951–1952)

Mike Mitchell Goliat (November 5, 1921 – January 13, 2004) was an American professional baseball second baseman, who played in Major League Baseball (MLB) for the Philadelphia Phillies (1949–51) and St. Louis Browns (1951–52). He batted and threw right-handed, and was listed at 6 feet (1.8 m) tall and 180 pounds (82 kg).

A native of Yatesboro, Pennsylvania, Goliat was the starting second baseman for the Phillies "Whiz Kids" team which won the 1950 National League (NL) pennant. In that season, he batted .234, with 13 home runs, 64 runs batted in (RBI), 49 runs scored, 113 hits, 13 doubles, and six triples, in 145 games played; it was Goliat‘s only season as a regular starting player. In the World Series loss to the New York Yankees, he hit .214, with three hits, one run scored, and one RBI, in 14 at bats (AB).

Goliat finished his four-season big league baseball career with a batting average of .225, 186 hits (in 825 AB), 21 doubles, 10 triples, 20 home runs, and 99 RBI, with three stolen bases, in 249 games played.

Goliat played in Minor League Baseball (MiLB) for the Toronto Maple Leafs (1949; 1952–59), and was named the International League (IL) Most Valuable Player (MVP), in 1956. He holds the Maple Leafs’ franchise career records for games played (1,077), home runs (138), doubles (186), and RBI (556).

== Post-baseball life ==
After retiring from pro baseball following the 1961 season, Goliat ran a small trucking firm for several years before joining the Ford Motor Company.

Goliat died on January 13, 2004, in Seven Hills, Ohio, at 82 years of age.

== Quotations ==
- "He was really a third baseman, but he played second for us to fill a need. He really had a strong arm. He was a battler who gave everything he had and he had a lot of big hits off (Brooklyn Dodgers ace) Don Newcombe the year we won the pennant." – Hall of Famer / Teammate Robin Roberts.
- "He hit the better pitchers in the league. The ones that got him out were the lesser ones." – Phillies manager Eddie Sawyer
