= Joe Durham =

American baseball player and coach (1931–2016)

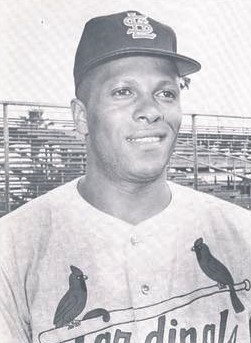
- Outfielder
- Born: July 31, 1931; Newport News, Virginia, U.S.
- Died: April 28, 2016 (aged 84); Randallstown, Maryland, U.S.
- Batted: Right Threw: Right

MLB debut
- September 10, 1954, for the Baltimore Orioles

Last MLB appearance
- May 6, 1959, for the St. Louis Cardinal

MLB statistics
- Batting average: .188
- Home runs: 5
- Runs batted in: 20
- Stats at Baseball Reference

Teams
- Baltimore Orioles (1954, 1957); St. Louis Cardinals (1959)

Joseph Vann Durham (July 31, 1931 – April 28, 2016) was an American professional baseball player and coach. An outfielder, he appeared in Major League Baseball in 93 games for the Baltimore Orioles (1954 and 1957) and St. Louis Cardinals (1959). Durham attended Huntington High School in his native city of Newport News, Virginia, and Shaw University. He threw and batted right-handed and was listed as 6 feet 1 inch (1.85 m) tall and 186 pounds (84 kg).

Durham began his professional career in the Negro leagues with the Chicago American Giants, then was signed by Bill Veeck, president of the St. Louis Browns, prior to the 1953 season. He was in the Browns' farm system when the franchise moved to Baltimore, Maryland, in 1954. After an outstanding season in the Double-A Texas League in 1954, he was recalled by the Orioles in September and in ten games collected nine hits in 44 plate appearances, including his first Major League home run off Al Sima of the Philadelphia Athletics on September 12. Durham was one of the two African-American players on the Orioles roster in 1954. The other was Jay Heard. Durham then missed the 1955–1956 seasons performing military service.

He began the 1957 season in the Texas League — but was recalled by Baltimore in June after batting a torrid .391 over the first 50 games of the season. He then appeared in 77 games for the Orioles over the rest of the year, starting 40 games as an outfielder, but he batted only .186 and was sent to the Triple-A Vancouver Mounties for 1958. A solid season there (.285 and 85 runs batted in) resulted in Durham's selection by the Cardinals in the 1958 Rule 5 draft. He began 1959 on the Cardinals' roster, but appeared in only six games, starting one. He went hitless in five at bats and scored two runs. He was then returned to Vancouver and the Orioles' system. Apart from 1963, which he spent in the New York Yankees' system, Durham played at the top level of the Baltimore organization through 1964, then became the team's batting practice pitcher. He moved into the Orioles' front office in 1986, then became a coach for the Class A Frederick Keys of the Carolina League.

All told, he was a member of the Orioles' organization for over 40 years.

Durham died on April 28, 2016, at the Northwest Hospital Hospice Center in Randallstown, Maryland, at the age of 84.
