= Marion Marauders =

- Location: Marion, NC
- League: Western Carolina League 1948–1952; Tar Heel League 1953-1954
- Affiliation: Baltimore Orioles, 1954
- Ballpark: Marion Municipal Stadium
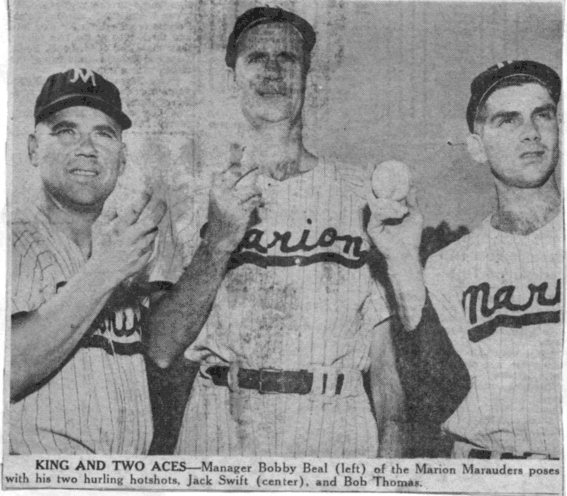
  Pitcher Kelly Jack Swift of the Marion Marauders from a July 24, 1953 article in the Asheville (N.C.) Times

The Marion Marauders were a Class D Minor League baseball team based in Marion, North Carolina. During their existence from 1948 to 1954, they had an overall record of 361–333. Their most successful season was in 1953, when they won the Tar Heel League regular season, and saw their star pitcher Kelly Jack Swift go 30–7 with a 2.54 ERA, winning the pitching Triple Crown. Swift still remains the last 30-game winner in Minor League baseball history. The team folded along with the rest of the Tar Heel League on June 21, 1954.

== Year–by–year records ==
Year	Record	Finish	Manager	Playoffs
1948	49–54	6th	Wes Ferrell	Did not qualify
1949	40–62	6th	Johnny Lanning / Jack Triplett	Did not qualify
1950	56–54	4th	Russell "Red" Mincy	Lost in 1st round
1951	58–52	6th	Russell "Red" Mincy	Did not qualify
1952	58–50	3rd	Gabby Grant / William Smith / Franklin Robinson	Lost in 1st round
1953	74–35	1st	Bob Beal	Won league pennant Lost League Finals
1954	26–26	2nd (t)	Robert Knoke	League disbanded June 21
Total	361–333			
