= Dick Kokos =

American baseball player (1928–1986)

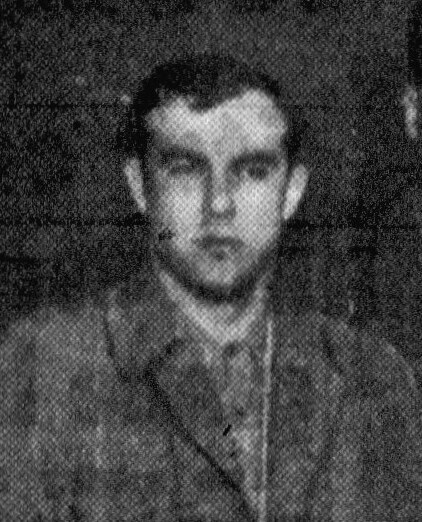
- Kokos, circa 1949
- Outfielder
- Born: February 28, 1928; Chicago, Illinois, U.S.
- Died: April 9, 1986 (aged 58); Chicago, Illinois, U.S.
- Batted: Left Threw: Left

MLB debut
- July 8, 1948, for the St. Louis Browns

Last MLB appearance
- May 10, 1954, for the Baltimore Orioles

MLB statistics
- Batting average: .263
- Home runs: 59
- Runs batted in: 223
- Stats at Baseball Reference

Teams
- St. Louis Browns / Baltimore Orioles (1948–1950, 1953–1954)

Richard Jerome Kokos, born Kokoszka (February 28, 1928 – April 9, 1986), was an American professional baseball outfielder. He played in Major League Baseball (MLB) for the St. Louis Browns/Baltimore Orioles, making his major league debut at age 20. After playing from 1948 to 1950, he joined the army during the Korean War. Although he had hit effectively prior to his military service, when he returned in 1953 his hitting declined, and he was released after the 1954 season. In a 5-year, 475-game career, he compiled a .263 batting average (410-1558) with 239 runs, 59 home runs, 223 RBI, an on-base percentage of .365 and a slugging percentage of .441. Kokos was originally a Cleveland Indians prospect, and was traded on November 20, 1947 with $25,000, Joe Frazier, and Bryan Stephens for Walt Judnich and Bob Muncrief.
