= Marlin Stuart =

American baseball player (1918–1994)

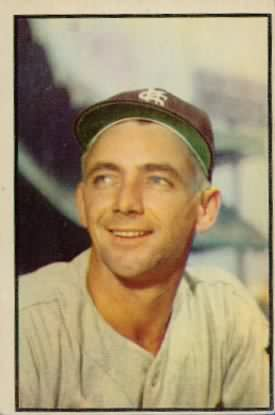
- Stuart as a member of the St. Louis Browns (1953)
- Pitcher
- Born: August 8, 1918; Paragould, Arkansas, U.S.
- Died: June 16, 1994 (aged 75); Paragould, Arkansas, U.S.
- Batted: Left Threw: Right

MLB debut
- April 26, 1949, for the Detroit Tigers

Last MLB appearance
- August 8, 1954, for the New York Yankees

MLB statistics
- Win–loss record: 23–17
- Earned run average: 4.65
- Strikeouts: 185
- Stats at Baseball Reference

Teams
- Detroit Tigers (1949–1952); St. Louis Browns / Baltimore Orioles (1952–1954); New York Yankees (1954)

Marlin Henry Stuart (August 8, 1918 – June 16, 1994) was an American professional baseball pitcher. The right-hander from Paragould, Arkansas, appeared in 196 games pitched (165 in relief) in Major League Baseball for three American League teams. He batted left-handed and was listed as 6 feet 2 inches (1.88 m) tall and 185 pounds (84 kg).

== Baseball career ==
=== Minor leagues ===
Stuart played for Greene County Tech, Paragould High School and local American Legion teams while working as a farmer and picking cotton. He signed as a free agent with the St. Louis Browns' system in 1940 and began his minor league baseball career at the Class D level with the Mayfield Browns of the KITTY League. Before his 40th and last appearance of the season, Stuart asked his manager if he could pitch barefoot, which was his custom as a boy. Given the green light, Stuart went to the mound on September 7 without socks or spikes and defeated the Fulton Tigers, throwing a seven-inning complete game and striking out 11. After three years in the lower minors, Stuart missed the 1943–1945 seasons while performing World War II military duty. He returned to baseball in 1946 and was acquired by the Detroit Tigers' organization during the 1948 minor-league campaign. On June 27, 1950, Stuart pitched a perfect game for the Toledo Mud Hens of the Triple-A American Association, defeating the Indianapolis Indians, 1-0.

=== Major leagues ===
Stuart first appeared in the major leagues the Tigers in 1949 as a 30-year-old rookie. He got into 33 games for Detroit in 1949 and 1950, with some return visits to the minor leagues, then spent the full 1951 season with the Tigers, working in 29 contests. In 1952—a nightmarish season for the Tigers, who would lose 104 games and finish last—he fashioned a winning record (3–2) in 30 games with Detroit through August 14, when he was traded back to the Browns in an eight-player waiver deal. In 1953, the last year the Browns would spend in St. Louis before transferring to Baltimore, he led the pitching staff with eight victories; his 8–2 won–lost record was notable, for the Browns posted a poor 54–100 mark all season. He was second in the American League with 60 appearances, after finishing fifth in the Junior Circuit the previous year with 42 games pitched. His last MLB season was 1954, when he pitched in 22 games for the relocated Baltimore Orioles and ten games for the New York Yankees. He retired from professional baseball in 1956.

Despite pitching for several struggling teams, Stuart compiled a career won–lost mark of 23–17 (.575), along with 12 saves. As a starting pitcher, he threw seven complete games, although none was a shutout. He allowed 544 hits and 256 bases on balls in 485 2/3 innings pitched, with 185 strikeouts. His lifetime MLB earned run average was 4.65.

Stuart died in Paragould at age 75 in June of 1994.
