= Bobby Brown (third baseman) =

American baseball player (1924–2021)

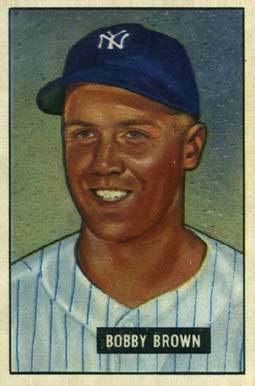
- Third baseman
- Born: October 25, 1924; Seattle, Washington, U.S.
- Died: March 25, 2021 (aged 96); Fort Worth, Texas, U.S.
- Batted: Left Threw: Right

MLB debut
- September 22, 1946, for the New York Yankees

Last MLB appearance
- June 30, 1954, for the New York Yankees

MLB statistics
- Batting average: .279
- Home runs: 22
- Runs batted in: 237
- Stats at Baseball Reference

Teams
- New York Yankees (1946–1952, 1954)

Career highlights and awards
- 4× World Series champion (1947, 1949–1951)

Robert William Brown (October 25, 1924 – March 25, 2021) was an American professional baseball third baseman and executive who was the president of the American League (AL) from 1984 to 1994. He also was a physician who studied for his medical degree during his eight-year playing career with the New York Yankees (1946–1952, 1954), where he was a member of four World Series championship teams.

Brown's .439 career postseason batting average (18-for-31) ranks second in MLB history (Note: Minimum 40 career postseason plate appearances.), trailing only Bill Hoskins (.487).

== Early life ==
Brown was born in Seattle, Washington, on October 25, 1924. He attended Galileo High School in San Francisco, where he attained straight-As and served as president of the student body. He studied at Stanford University starting in 1942, where he and another student were involved in the rescue of a Coast Guardsman from a plane crash. Brown consequently received a Silver Lifesaving Medal for his effort. While at Stanford, he joined the Sigma Rho chapter of Delta Kappa Epsilon fraternity. He was chosen in the Selective Service draft one year later and was initially stationed at the naval unit at the University of California, Los Angeles (UCLA). There, he played baseball for the UCLA Bruins, before being temporarily assigned to the Naval Medical Center San Diego. He was subsequently transferred to the Tulane University School of Medicine in December 1944 and discharged from the navy in January 1946. He was signed as an amateur free agent by the New York Yankees before the 1946 season.

== Professional career ==
=== New York Yankees (1946–1954) ===
Brown played one season in the minor leagues in 1946. He made his MLB debut on September 22, 1946, one month short of his 22nd birthday, recording his first hit and scoring his first run in a 4–3 win over the Philadelphia Athletics. He was employed as a pinch hitter on four occasions during the 1947 World Series and went a perfect 3-for-3, collecting a single, two doubles, and a walk.

Brown had the fifth-most errors as a third baseman in the American League in 1949 with 13. In the World Series that year, he hit a bases-loaded triple in Game 4, and a two-run triple in the championship-clinching Game 5. He tripled again in the final game of the 1950 World Series.

Nicknamed as "Golden Boy" and "Blond Phenom" during his baseball career, Brown played 548 regular-season games for the Yankees, mostly as a platoon third baseman. He had a lifetime batting average of .279 and 22 home runs. In addition, he appeared in four World Series (1947, 1949, 1950, 1951) for New York, winning all four while batting .439 (18-for-41) in 17 games. Brown batted left-handed and threw right-handed. He missed 19 months due to military service during the Korean War. He played his final major league game on June 30, 1954, at the age of 29.

A famous story that has made the rounds for years in baseball circles, and was told by Brown himself, concerns the time when Brown's road roommate in Triple-A was future star Yankee catcher Yogi Berra, who had little formal education. The two were reading in their hotel room one night – Berra a comic book and Brown his copy of Boyd's Pathology. Berra came to the end of his comic, tossed it aside, and asked Brown, "So, how is yours turning out?"

== Post-playing career ==
Brown practiced cardiology in the Dallas–Fort Worth area until May 1974, when he took a leave of absence to serve as an interim president of the AL Texas Rangers – then returned to medicine following the season. In 1984, he succeeded Lee MacPhail as AL president and held the post for a decade. Gene Budig succeeded him. In 1992 and 1993, Brown presented the World Series Trophy (on both occasions to the Toronto Blue Jays), as at the time the office of Commissioner of Baseball was officially vacant, with Bud Selig exercising the powers of the commissioner as chairman of the executive council. The presidencies of both the American League and the National League were eliminated in 2000, and their duties were absorbed by the office of the Commissioner.

== Personal life ==
Brown was a decorated veteran of two wars, participated in five championship teams (only playing in four World Series), a physician, and the president of the American League. He is considered to have a unique record among the history of major league baseball.

Brown was a contestant on the game show To Tell The Truth on March 26, 1957.

Brown's wife of more than 60 years, Sara, died on March 26, 2012. They were married in October 1951, shortly after the 1951 World Series. Brown raised three children with his wife Sara Kathryn French. The Browns made a striking couple for decades. During his final Old-Timers’ Day visit in 2019, Brown recalled their dating days and remembered giving his future wife advice on how she should describe him to her parents. “Tell your mother that I’m in medical school, studying to be a cardiologist,” he said. “Tell your dad that I play third base for the Yankees.”

Brown died on March 25, 2021, at his home in Fort Worth, Texas. He was 96, and was the last living member of the Yankees team that won the 1947 World Series. He was also the last surviving member of the Yankees teams that won the World Series in 1949, 1950, and 1951. His good friend, Eddie Robinson, was the last surviving member of the 1948 Cleveland Indians World Series-winning team. There are no living players who played on an earlier World Series-winning team.

== See also ==
- List of Major League Baseball postseason records
