= Joe Frazier (baseball) =

American baseball player (1922–2011)

- Right fielder
- Born: October 6, 1922; Liberty, North Carolina, U.S.
- Died: February 15, 2011 (aged 88); Broken Arrow, Oklahoma, U.S.
- Batted: Left Threw: Right

MLB debut
- August 31, 1947, for the Cleveland Indians

Last MLB appearance
- September 30, 1956, for the Baltimore Orioles

MLB statistics
- Batting average: .241
- Home runs: 10
- Runs batted in: 45
- Managerial record: 101–106
- Winning %: .488
- Stats at Baseball Reference
- Managerial record at Baseball Reference

Teams
- As player: Cleveland Indians (1947); St. Louis Cardinals (1954–1956); Cincinnati Redlegs (1956); Baltimore Orioles (1956); As manager: New York Mets (1976–1977)

Joseph Filmore Frazier (October 6, 1922 – February 15, 2011) was an American outfielder and manager in Major League Baseball.

He was signed as an amateur free agent in 1941, but did not play in the major leagues until 1947. After 1947, he was traded on November 20, 1947 with $25,000, Dick Kokos, and Bryan Stephens for Walt Judnich and Bob Muncrief. He spent parts of three seasons in the majors in the 1950s, primarily with the St. Louis Cardinals. In 1956, at the age of 33, he finished his playing career after having played in 217 games.

He then had a successful career as a minor league manager, first in the Houston Astros organization, and then, beginning in 1968, in the New York Mets farm system. He managed in Mankato of the Northern League, then Pompano Beach in the Florida State League. He would win the pennant in 1971 with Visalia of the California League. He then went on to win league championships with Memphis and Victoria in the Texas League.

Frazier, managing the Tidewater Tides in 1975, won the International League championship. The Tides had to win 22 of their last 33 games to finish the regular season in a first-place tie with the Rochester Red Wings. The Tides then won a one-game playoff behind the four-hit pitching of Nino Espinosa. The Tides advanced to win the Governors' Cup by defeating Charleston three games to none, and then Syracuse, three games to one. They then went on to the Junior World Series, losing to Evansville of the American Association four games to one.

Following that successful 1975 season, Frazier was promoted to manager of the parent Mets on October 3, replacing interim manager Roy McMillan. At his introductory press conference, Mets General Manager Joe McDonald said, "Joe Frazier has consistently proved to us his ability to handle players. Winning is what it's all about, and Joe Frazier is a winner." Frazier himself added, "I'm the type of manager who stresses fundamentals. I think a man should go from first to third on a hit and second to home. I demand hustle. If I have my way, you're going to see a Mets' club next year that will hustle."

Frazier managed the Mets to an 86–76 record in 1976, good for a third-place finish and an improvement over their 82–80 record from the previous season. But Frazier's Mets got off to a poor start in 1977, and following a 15–30 record, Frazier was replaced as Mets manager by Joe Torre, who was an active player on the Mets roster at the time.

In 1982 he was the manager of the Louisville Redbirds, the AAA affiliate of the St. Louis Cardinals. The team finished in second place with a record of 73–62. He was succeeded as manager of the Redbirds by Jim Fregosi.

Sporting positions
Preceded by John Antonelli	Tidewater Tides manager 1975–1975	Succeeded by Tom Burgess
Preceded by Tommy Thompson	Louisville Redbirds manager 1982–1982	Succeeded by Jim Fregosi
