= 1976 Major League Baseball postseason =

1976 Major League Baseball playoffs

Tournament details
- Dates: October 9–21, 1976
- Teams: 4

Final positions
- Champions: Cincinnati Reds (4th title)
- Runners-up: New York Yankees

Tournament statistics
- Games played: 12
- Attendance: 655,499 (54,625 per game)
- Most HRs: Johnny Bench (CIN) (3)
- Most SBs: Joe Morgan (CIN) (4)
- Best ERA: Don Gullett (CIN) (1.17)
- Most Ks (as pitcher): Catfish Hunter (NYY) (10)

Awards
- MVP: Johnny Bench (CIN)

The 1976 Major League Baseball postseason was the playoff tournament of Major League Baseball for the 1976 season. The winners of each division advance to the postseason and face each other in a League Championship Series to determine the pennant winners that face each other in the World Series.

This edition of the postseason featured new teams. In the American League, the Kansas City Royals made their first postseason appearance in franchise history, becoming the first expansion team on the American League side to make the postseason. Joining them were the New York Yankees, who returned to the postseason for the first time since 1964.

In the National League, the Philadelphia Phillies made their first postseason appearance since 1950, ending the second longest postseason drought in the majors, and the Cincinnati Reds returned for the fifth time in the past seven seasons.

This was the first of three consecutive postseasons to feature the Royals, Yankees, and Phillies, and they would also appear in the postseason in 1980, 1981 and 2024.

The playoffs began on October 9, 1976, and concluded on October 21, 1976, with the Cincinnati Reds sweeping the New York Yankees in the 1976 World Series. It was the fourth title for the Reds overall, and the Reds became the sixth franchise in MLB history to repeat as World Series champions. The Reds became the first team (and the only team to date) to go undefeated in the postseason in the divisional era, and they were the last National League team to repeat as World Series champions until the Los Angeles Dodgers did so in 2024 and 2025.

== Teams ==
American League Teams National League Teams

The following teams qualified for the postseason:

=== American League ===
- New York Yankees – 97–62, AL East champions
- Kansas City Royals – 90–72, AL West champions

=== National League ===
- Philadelphia Phillies – 101–61, NL East champions
- Cincinnati Reds – 102–60, NL West champions

== Playoff bracket ==
League Championship Series (ALCS, NLCS)
East	NY Yankees	3
West	Kansas City	2
East	Philadelphia	0
West	Cincinnati	3

World Series
AL	NY Yankees	0
NL	Cincinnati	4

== American League Championship Series ==
=== New York Yankees vs. Kansas City Royals ===
New York won the series, 3–2.

Game	Date	Score	Location	Time	Attendance
1	October 9	New York Yankees – 4, Kansas City Royals – 1	Royals Stadium	2:09	41,077
2	October 10	New York Yankees – 3, Kansas City Royals – 7	Royals Stadium	2:45	41,091
3	October 12	Kansas City Royals – 3, New York Yankees – 5	Yankee Stadium	3:00	56,808
4	October 13	Kansas City Royals – 7, New York Yankees – 4	Yankee Stadium	2:50	56,355
5	October 14	Kansas City Royals – 6, New York Yankees – 7	Yankee Stadium	3:13	56,821

This was the first ALCS to not feature either the Oakland Athletics or the Baltimore Orioles.

This was the first postseason meeting between the Yankees and Royals. The Yankees defeated the Royals in a back-and-forth five game series to return to the World Series for the first time since 1964.

In Kansas City, the Yankees stole Game 1 on the road as Catfish Hunter pitched a five-hit complete game. In Game 2, the Royals, thanks to excellent relief pitching from Paul Splittorff, as well as five errors committed by the Yankees, evened the series headed to the Bronx. In the first postseason game at the newly renovated Yankee Stadium, the Royals jumped out to an early 3–0 lead after the first inning, but the Yankees rallied with five unanswered runs in the fourth and sixth innings respectively to win by a 5–3 score and go up 2–1 in the series. Graig Nettles hit two homers and three RBIs as he carried the Royals to victory in Game 4. Game 5 remained tied at six runs each until the bottom of the ninth inning, when Chris Chambliss won the pennant for the Yankees with his famous walk-off home run, which became one of the most iconic moments in postseason history.

The Yankees and Royals would face each other again in three of the next four ALCS' - they met again the next year, which the Yankees also won in five games after being three outs away from elimination in Game 5. The Yankees defeated the Royals again in four games in 1978 en route to repeating as World Series champions. Then in 1980, the Royals swept the Yankees for their first pennant before falling in the World Series.

== National League Championship Series ==
=== Cincinnati Reds vs. Philadelphia Phillies ===
Cincinnati won the series, 3–0.

Game	Date	Score	Location	Time	Attendance
1	October 9	Cincinnati Reds – 6, Philadelphia Phillies – 3	Veterans Stadium	2:39	62,640
2	October 10	Cincinnati Reds – 6, Philadelphia Phillies – 2	Veterans Stadium	2:24	62,651
3	October 12	Philadelphia Phillies – 6, Cincinnati Reds – 7	Riverfront Stadium	2:43	55,047

This was the first postseason meeting between the Reds and Phillies. The Reds swept the Phillies to advance to their fourth World Series in six years (in the process denying a rematch of the 1950 World Series between the Yankees and Phillies).

Don Gullett pitched eight solid innings and closer Rawly Eastwick shut the door on the Phillies as the Reds stole Game 1 on the road. In Game 2, the Phillies jumped out to a 2–0 lead after five innings, but the Reds scored six unanswered runs in the sixth and seventh innings respectively to win by a 6–2 score and go up 2–0 headed home to Cincinnati. Game 3 was an offensive slugfest between both teams - the Phillies jumped out to a 3–0 lead after the top of the seventh, but the Reds took the lead with four runs scored in the bottom of the inning. The Phillies regained the lead with two runs scored in the top of the eighth, and scored once more in the top of the ninth to go up 6–4. However, the Reds would eventually tie the game, and then won off an RBI single from Ken Griffey, securing the pennant. The Phillies became the fourth 100+ win team to be swept in the postseason, and first since the 1971 Oakland Athletics.

This was the first of three straight losses in the NLCS for the Phillies, as the next year and in 1978 the Phillies would lose the pennant to the Los Angeles Dodgers in four games both times. They would eventually win the pennant in 1980 over the Houston Astros in five games en route to their first championship after being six outs away from elimination in Game 5.

The Reds returned to the NLCS three years later, but were swept by the eventual World Series champion Pittsburgh Pirates. They would win their next and most recent pennant in 1990 over the Pirates in six games en route to their most recent championship.

Both the Reds and Phillies would meet again in the NLDS in 2010, where the Phillies returned the favor and swept the Reds.

== 1976 World Series ==
=== New York Yankees (AL) vs. Cincinnati Reds (NL) ===
Cincinnati won the series, 4-0.

Game	Date	Score	Location	Time	Attendance
1	October 16	New York Yankees – 1, Cincinnati Reds – 5	Riverfront Stadium	2:10	54,826
2	October 17	New York Yankees – 3, Cincinnati Reds – 4	Riverfront Stadium	2:33	54,816
3	October 19	Cincinnati Reds – 6, New York Yankees – 2	Yankee Stadium	2:40	56,667
4	October 21†	Cincinnati Reds – 7, New York Yankees – 2	Yankee Stadium	2:36	56,700

†: postponed from October 20 due to rain

This was the third World Series matchup between the Reds and Yankees. The other two times were in 1939 and 1961, which the Yankees both won. However, this time history would not repeat itself, as the Reds handily swept the Yankees to repeat as World Series champions, completing a perfect 7–0 run through the postseason.

The series was dominated by the Reds - Don Gullett pitched seven solid innings and closer Pedro Borbon continued to stifle the Yankees’ offense as the Reds took Game 1. In Game 2, Catfish Hunter pitched a complete game for the Yankees as the game remained tied at three going into the bottom of the ninth, but it wasn't enough as the Reds prevailed as Tony Pérez drove Ken Griffey home with an RBI single, going up 2–0 in the series headed to the Bronx. In the first World Series game played at the newly renovated Yankee Stadium, it would turn into disappointment for the home team, as Pat Zachry pitched six solid innings and the Reds jumped out to an early lead and did not relinquish it as they took a commanding three games to none series lead. The Yankees would take their only lead of the series in Game 4 by jumping ahead 1–0 after the first, but they were once again no match for the Reds' offense, as they blew out the Yankees in front of their home fans to complete the sweep and secure the title. Game 4 was Pete Rose’s final postseason game with the Reds.

As of 2026, this is the last time that the Yankees were swept in the World Series. The Yankees would return to the World Series in the next year and in 1978, defeating their National League rival in the Los Angeles Dodgers in six games both times.

The 1976 Reds became the first visiting team since the 1957 Milwaukee Braves to win the World Series at Yankee Stadium. They would eventually be joined by the Los Angeles Dodgers in 1981, the Florida Marlins in 2003, and the Dodgers again in 2024. The 1976 Reds' 7–0 run through the postseason stood as an MLB record for 38 years, which was matched by the 2007 Colorado Rockies before they were swept in the World Series, and was broken by the 2014 Kansas City Royals who went 8–0 through the AL Wild Card, ALDS and ALCS before they lost in the World Series. The Reds became the first National League team to repeat as World Series champions since the then-New York Giants did so in 1921 and 1922, and were the last NL team to repeat as champions until the Dodgers did so in 2024 and 2025. The Reds would win their next and most recent World Series title in 1990 over the Oakland Athletics in another sweep.

== Broadcasting ==
This marked the first postseason under U.S. broadcast rights deals with ABC and NBC. ABC would air both LCS in even-numbered years starting in 1976, and the World Series in odd-numbered years starting in 1977. NBC would then air the World Series in even-numbered years starting in 1976, and both LCS in odd-numbered years starting in 1977.

Each team's local broadcaster also televised coverage of LCS games.
