= Jay Heard =

American baseball player (1920–1999)

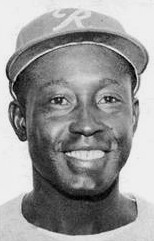
- Pitcher
- Born: January 17, 1920; Athens, Georgia, U.S.
- Died: November 18, 1999 (aged 79); Birmingham, Alabama, U.S.
- Batted: Left Threw: Left

Professional debut
- NgL: 1945, for the Birmingham Black Barons
- NPB: 1952, for the Hiroshima Carp
- MLB: April 24, 1954, for the Baltimore Orioles

Last MLB appearance
- May 28, 1954, for the Baltimore Orioles

MLB statistics
- Win–loss record: 0–0
- Earned run average: 13.50
- Innings pitched: 3 1/3
- Stats at Baseball Reference

Teams
- Negro leagues: Birmingham Black Barons (1945–1949); Memphis Red Sox (1949); Houston/New Orleans Eagles (1949–1951); Major League Baseball: Baltimore Orioles (1954)

Career highlights and awards
- NgL All-Star (1951)

Jehosie "Jay" Heard (January 17, 1920 – November 18, 1999) was an American professional baseball player. A native of Athens, Georgia, he was a left-handed pitcher who stood 5 feet 7 inches (1.70 m) tall and weighed 155 pounds (70 kg). He pitched two games in Major League Baseball for the 1954 Baltimore Orioles, becoming the franchise's first African American player in Baltimore.

Heard began his pro career in the Negro leagues after serving in the United States Army during World War II. During his career in the Negro leagues, he pitched for the Birmingham Black Barons, Memphis Red Sox, Houston Eagles and New Orleans Eagles. In 1952, at age 32, he joined the organized minor leagues, winning 20 games for the Victoria Tyees of the Class A Western International League. Promoted the following season to the top level of the minors, the Open Classification Pacific Coast League, Heard won 16 games for the Portland Beavers. The Orioles, newly transplanted to Baltimore as the former St. Louis Browns, purchased Heard's contract that winter.

Heard was a member of the first Baltimore team to play in the American League since 1902. He made two appearances for the 1954 Orioles as a relief pitcher, both times against the Chicago White Sox. In his April 24 debut, he faced four batters and retired all of them. But in his second game, more than a month later on May 28, Heard allowed six hits and five runs, all earned, in two innings. A grand slam home run by Chicago's light-hitting Cass Michaels was the most damaging blow.

He then returned to the minors, where he pitched at the upper levels through 1957.

== See also ==
- List of Negro league baseball players who played in Major League Baseball
