= 1957 Baltimore Orioles season =

Major League Baseball season

1957 Baltimore Orioles
- League: American League
- Ballpark: Memorial Stadium
- City: Baltimore, Maryland
- Record: 76–76 (.500)
- League place: 5th
- Owners: Jerold Hoffberger, Joseph Iglehart
- General managers: Paul Richards
- Managers: Paul Richards
- Television: WMAR-TV/WAAM/WBAL-TV
- Radio: WCBM (Ernie Harwell, Herb Carneal, Larry Ray)

The 1957 Baltimore Orioles season involved the Orioles finishing 5th in the American League with a record of 76 wins and 76 losses. It was the franchise's first non-losing season since 1945, when it was still the St. Louis Browns.

== Offseason ==
- February 8, 1957: Jim Brideweser was purchased by the Orioles from the Detroit Tigers.

== Regular season ==
=== Season standings ===
American League
Team	W	L	Pct.	GB	Home	Road
New York Yankees	98	56	.636	—	48‍–‍29	50‍–‍27
Chicago White Sox	90	64	.584	8	45‍–‍32	45‍–‍32
Boston Red Sox	82	72	.532	16	44‍–‍33	38‍–‍39
Detroit Tigers	78	76	.506	20	45‍–‍32	33‍–‍44
Baltimore Orioles	76	76	.500	21	42‍–‍33	34‍–‍43
Cleveland Indians	76	77	.497	21½	40‍–‍37	36‍–‍40
Kansas City Athletics	59	94	.386	38½	37‍–‍40	22‍–‍54
Washington Senators	55	99	.357	43	28‍–‍49	27‍–‍50

=== Record vs. opponents ===
1957 American League record Sources:
Team	BAL	BOS	CWS	CLE	DET	KCA	NYY	WSH
Baltimore	—	8–14	10–12–1	9–12	9–13	16–5–1	9–13	15–7
Boston	14–8	—	8–14	12–10	10–12	16–6	8–14	14–8
Chicago	12–10–1	14–8	—	14–8	11–11	14–8	8–14	17–5
Cleveland	12–9	10–12	8–14	—	11–11	11–11	9–13	15–7
Detroit	13–9	12–10	11–11	11–11	—	8–14	10–12	13–9
Kansas City	5–16–1	6–16	8–14	11–11	14–8	—	3–19	12–10
New York	13–9	14–8	14–8	13–9	12–10	19–3	—	13–9
Washington	7–15	8–14	5–17	7–15	9–13	10–12	9–13	—

=== Notable transactions ===
- June 24, 1957: Jack Fisher was signed as an amateur free agent by the Orioles.
- September 19, 1957: Eddie Miksis was selected off waivers by the Orioles from the St. Louis Cardinals.
- September 19, 1957: Morrie Martin was purchased from the Orioles by the St. Louis Cardinals.

=== Roster ===
1957 Baltimore Orioles
Roster
Pitchers: 27 Charlie Beamon; 28 Hal Brown; 16 Art Ceccarelli; 21 Sandy Consuegra; 39 Don Ferrarese; 41 Mike Fornieles; 21 Art Houtteman; 36 Connie Johnson; 39 Ken Lehman; 18 Billy Loes; 29 Ray Moore; 38 Billy O'Dell; 23 Milt Pappas; 24 Dizzy Trout; 41 Jerry Walker; 17 Bill Wight; 35 George Zuverink	Catchers: 22 Joe Ginsberg; 10 Tom Patton; 11 Gus Triandos; 42 Frank Zupo; Infielders: 1 Bob Boyd; 19,40 Jim Brideweser; 33 Wayne Causey; 9 Billy Gardner; 10 Billy Goodman; 6 Bob Hale; 3 George Kell; 7 Willy Miranda; 8 Buddy Peterson; 5,34 Brooks Robinson	Outfielders: 23 Jim Busby; 27 Joe Durham; 44 Tito Francona; 21 Lenny Green; 37 Tex Nelson; 4 Bob Nieman; 2 Al Pilarcik; 42 Carl Powis; 8 Jim Pyburn; 23 Dick Williams; Other batters: 6 Eddie Miksis; 37 Eddie Robinson	Manager: 12 Paul Richards; Coaches: 45 Jimmy Adair; 31 Harry Brecheen; 26 Lum Harris; 37 Eddie Robinson; 30 Al Vincent

== Player stats ==
=== Batting ===
==== Starters by position ====
Note: Pos = Position; G = Games played; AB = At bats; H = Hits; Avg. = Batting average; HR = Home runs; RBI = Runs batted in

Pos	Player	G	AB	H	Avg.	HR	RBI
C	Gus Triandos	129	418	106	.254	19	72
1B	Bob Boyd	141	485	154	.318	4	34
2B	Billy Gardner	154	644	169	.262	6	55
SS	Willy Miranda	115	314	61	.194	0	20
3B	George Kell	99	310	92	.297	9	44
LF	Bob Nieman	129	445	123	.276	13	70
CF	Jim Busby	86	288	72	.250	3	19
RF	Al Pilarcik	142	407	113	.278	9	49

==== Other batters ====
Note: G = Games played; AB = At bats; H = Hits; Avg. = Batting average; HR = Home runs; RBI = Runs batted in

Player	G	AB	H	Avg.	HR	RBI
Tito Francona	97	274	65	.233	7	38
Billy Goodman	73	263	81	.308	3	33
Joe Ginsberg	85	175	48	.274	1	18
Dick Williams	47	167	39	.234	1	17
Joe Durham	77	157	29	.185	4	17
Jim Brideweser	91	142	38	.268	1	18
Brooks Robinson	50	117	28	.239	2	14
Bob Hale	42	44	11	.250	0	7
Carl Powis	15	41	8	.195	0	2
Jim Pyburn	35	40	9	.225	1	2
Lenny Green	19	33	6	.182	1	5
Tex Nelson	15	23	5	.217	0	5
Buddy Peterson	7	17	3	.176	0	0
Frank Zupo	10	12	1	.083	0	0
Wayne Causey	14	10	2	.200	0	1
Eddie Robinson	4	3	0	.000	0	0
Tom Patton	1	2	0	.000	0	0
Eddie Miksis	1	1	0	.000	0	0

=== Pitching ===
==== Starting pitchers ====
Note: G = Games pitched; IP = Innings pitched; W = Wins; L = Losses; ERA = Earned run average; SO = Strikeouts

Player	G	IP	W	L	ERA	SO
Connie Johnson	35	242.0	14	11	3.20	177
Ray Moore	34	227.1	11	13	3.72	117
Hal Brown	25	150.0	7	8	3.90	62

==== Other pitchers ====
Note: G = Games pitched; IP = Innings pitched; W = Wins; L = Losses; ERA = Earned run average; SO = Strikeouts

Player	G	IP	W	L	ERA	SO
Billy Loes	31	155.1	12	7	3.24	86
Billy O'Dell	35	140.1	4	10	2.69	97
Bill Wight	27	121.0	6	6	3.64	50
Art Ceccarelli	20	58.0	0	5	4.50	30
Mike Fornieles	15	57.0	2	6	4.26	43
Jerry Walker	13	27.2	1	0	2.93	13
Don Ferrarese	8	19.0	1	1	4.74	13
Charlie Beamon	4	8.2	0	0	5.19	5
Art Houtteman	5	6.2	0	0	17.55	3

==== Relief pitchers ====
Note: G = Games pitched; W = Wins; L = Losses; SV = Saves; ERA = Earned run average; SO = Strikeouts

Player	G	W	L	SV	ERA	SO
George Zuverink	56	10	6	9	2.48	36
Ken Lehman	30	8	3	6	2.78	32
Sandy Consuegra	5	0	0	1	1.80	0
Milt Pappas	4	0	0	0	1.00	3
Dizzy Trout	2	0	0	0	81.00	0

== Farm system ==
Level	Team	League	Manager
Open	Vancouver Mounties	Pacific Coast League	Charlie Metro
AA	San Antonio Missions	Texas League	Joe Schultz
A	Knoxville Smokies	Sally League	George Staller
C	Phoenix Stars	Arizona–Mexico League	Bob Hooper
C	Aberdeen Pheasants	Northern League	Billy Capps and Barney Lutz
D	Kingsport Orioles	Appalachian League	Enid Drake
D	Fitzgerald Orioles	Georgia–Florida League	Earl Weaver
D	Paris Orioles	Sooner State League	Barney Lutz and Billy Capps

LEAGUE CHAMPIONS: Phoenix
