= 1957 Chicago White Sox season =

1957 Chicago White Sox
- League: American League
- Ballpark: Comiskey Park
- City: Chicago
- Owners: Dorothy Comiskey Rigney
- General managers: Chuck Comiskey/Johnny Rigney
- Managers: Al López
- Television: WGN-TV (Jack Brickhouse, Vince Lloyd)
- Radio: WCFL (Bob Elson, Don Wells)

The 1957 Chicago White Sox season was the team's 57th season in the major leagues, and its 58th season overall. They finished with a record of 90–64, good enough for second place in the American League, 8 games behind the first-place New York Yankees.

== Offseason ==
- Prior to 1957 season: Stan Johnson was signed as an amateur free agent by the White Sox.

== Regular season ==
- April 16, 1957: Roger Maris made his major league debut for the Cleveland Indians against the White Sox. In 5 at bats, Maris had 3 hits.

=== Season standings ===
American League
Team	W	L	Pct.	GB	Home	Road
New York Yankees	98	56	.636	—	48‍–‍29	50‍–‍27
Chicago White Sox	90	64	.584	8	45‍–‍32	45‍–‍32
Boston Red Sox	82	72	.532	16	44‍–‍33	38‍–‍39
Detroit Tigers	78	76	.506	20	45‍–‍32	33‍–‍44
Baltimore Orioles	76	76	.500	21	42‍–‍33	34‍–‍43
Cleveland Indians	76	77	.497	21½	40‍–‍37	36‍–‍40
Kansas City Athletics	59	94	.386	38½	37‍–‍40	22‍–‍54
Washington Senators	55	99	.357	43	28‍–‍49	27‍–‍50

=== Record vs. opponents ===
1957 American League record Sources:
Team	BAL	BOS	CWS	CLE	DET	KCA	NYY	WSH
Baltimore	—	8–14	10–12–1	9–12	9–13	16–5–1	9–13	15–7
Boston	14–8	—	8–14	12–10	10–12	16–6	8–14	14–8
Chicago	12–10–1	14–8	—	14–8	11–11	14–8	8–14	17–5
Cleveland	12–9	10–12	8–14	—	11–11	11–11	9–13	15–7
Detroit	13–9	12–10	11–11	11–11	—	8–14	10–12	13–9
Kansas City	5–16–1	6–16	8–14	11–11	14–8	—	3–19	12–10
New York	13–9	14–8	14–8	13–9	12–10	19–3	—	13–9
Washington	7–15	8–14	5–17	7–15	9–13	10–12	9–13	—

=== Opening Day lineup ===
- Luis Aparicio, SS
- Nellie Fox, 2B
- Minnie Miñoso, LF
- Sherm Lollar, C
- Larry Doby, CF
- Jim Landis, RF
- Jim Rivera, 1B
- Bubba Phillips, 3B
- Billy Pierce, P

=== Notable transactions ===
- June 14, 1957: Johnny Callison was signed as an amateur free agent by the White Sox.
- June 14, 1957: Dave Philley was traded by the White Sox to the Detroit Tigers for Earl Torgeson.

=== Roster ===
1957 Chicago White Sox
Roster
Pitchers: 18 Jim Derrington; 22 Dick Donovan; 20 Bill Fischer; 29 Jack Harshman; 28 Dixie Howell; 32 Jim Hughes; 15 Bob Keegan; 27 Ellis Kinder; 31 Paul LaPalme; 35 Barry Latman; 36 Jim McDonald; 6 Stover McIlwain; 19 Billy Pierce; 27 Don Rudolph; 21 Gerry Staley; 30 Jim Wilson	Catchers: 26 Earl Battey; 10 Sherm Lollar; 12 Les Moss; Infielders: 11 Luis Aparicio; 8 Walt Dropo; 48 Sammy Esposito; 2 Nellie Fox; 3 Fred Hatfield; 4 Ron Jackson; 5 Bubba Phillips; 17 Earl Torgeson	Outfielders: 16 Ted Beard; 14 Larry Doby; 1 Jim Landis; 9 Minnie Miñoso; 6 Dave Philley; 7 Jim Rivera; Other batters: 16 Bob Kennedy; 32 Ron Northey; 17 Bob Powell	Manager: 42 Al López; Coaches: 37 Ray Berres; 34 Johnny Cooney; 33 Tony Cuccinello; 39 Don Gutteridge

== Player stats ==
= Indicates team leader

= Indicates league leader

=== Batting ===
Note: G = Games played; AB = At bats; R = Runs scored; H = Hits; 2B = Doubles; 3B = Triples; HR = Home runs; RBI = Runs batted in; BB = Base on balls; SO = Strikeouts; AVG = Batting average; SB = Stolen bases

Player	G	AB	R	H	2B	3B	HR	RBI	BB	SO	AVG	SB
Luis Aparicio, SS	143	575	82	148	22	6	3	41	52	55	.257	28
Earl Battey, C	48	115	12	20	2	3	3	6	11	38	.174	0
Ted Beard, RF	38	78	15	16	1	0	0	7	18	14	.205	3
Larry Doby, CF	119	416	57	120	27	2	14	79	56	79	.288	2
Walt Dropo, 1B	93	223	24	57	2	0	13	49	16	40	.256	0
Sammy Esposito, 3B, SS	94	176	26	36	3	0	2	15	38	27	.205	5
Nellie Fox, 2B	155	619	110	196	27	8	6	61	75	13	.317	5
Fred Hatfield, 3B	69	114	14	23	3	0	0	8	15	20	.202	1
Ron Jackson, 1B	13	60	4	19	3	0	2	8	1	12	.317	0
Bob Kennedy, PH	4	2	0	0	0	0	0	0	0	1	.000	0
Jim Landis, OF	96	274	38	58	11	3	2	16	45	61	.212	14
Sherm Lollar, C	101	351	33	90	11	2	11	70	35	24	.256	2
Minnie Miñoso, LF	153	568	96	176	36	5	12	103	79	54	.310	18
Les Moss, C	42	115	10	31	3	0	2	12	20	18	.270	0
Ron Northey, PH	40	27	0	5	1	0	0	7	11	5	.185	0
Dave Philley, RF	22	71	9	23	4	0	0	9	4	10	.324	1
Bubba Phillips, 3B, CF, RF	121	393	38	106	13	3	7	42	28	32	.270	5
Bob Powell, PR	1	0	1	0	0	0	0	0	0	0	.000	0
Jim Rivera, RF, 1B	125	402	51	103	21	6	14	52	40	80	.256	18
Earl Torgeson, 1B	86	251	53	74	11	2	7	46	49	44	.295	7

Player	G	AB	R	H	2B	3B	HR	RBI	BB	SO	AVG	SB
Jim Derrington, P	20	4	1	0	0	0	0	0	1	2	.000	0
Dick Donovan, P	30	83	8	12	1	0	3	10	8	32	.145	0
Bill Fischer, P	33	40	1	6	0	0	0	5	0	8	.150	0
Jack Harshman, P	30	45	5	10	1	0	2	5	10	17	.222	0
Dixie Howell, P	42	27	4	5	1	1	3	3	2	6	.185	0
Bob Keegan, P	30	39	3	4	0	0	0	3	4	5	.103	0
Paul LaPalme, P	36	4	0	2	0	0	0	1	1	1	.500	0
Barry Latman, P	7	1	0	0	0	0	0	0	0	0	.000	0
Jim McDonald, P	10	1	0	0	0	0	0	0	1	1	.000	0
Billy Pierce, P	41	99	7	17	1	0	0	6	2	25	.172	0
Don Rudolph, P	5	2	0	1	1	0	0	0	0	0	.500	0
Gerry Staley, P	47	22	1	1	0	0	0	1	3	6	.045	0
Jim Wilson, P	31	68	4	10	2	0	0	5	7	14	.147	0
Team totals	155	5265	707	1369	208	41	106	670	632	744	.260	109

=== Pitching ===
Note: W = Wins; L = Losses; ERA = Earned run average; G = Games pitched; GS = Games started; SV = Saves; IP = Innings pitched; H = Hits allowed; R = Runs allowed; ER = Earned runs allowed; HR = Home runs allowed; BB = Walks allowed; K = Strikeouts

Player	W	L	ERA	G	GS	SV	IP	H	R	ER	HR	BB	K
Jim Derrington	0	1	4.86	20	5	0	37.0	29	21	20	4	29	14
Dick Donovan	16	6	2.77	28	28	0	220.2	203	76	68	17	53	88
Bill Fischer	7	8	3.48	33	11	1	124.0	139	50	48	1	41	48
Jack Harshman	8	8	4.10	30	26	1	151.1	142	78	69	16	84	83
Dixie Howell	6	5	3.29	37	0	6	68.1	64	25	25	6	34	37
Jim Hughes	0	0	10.80	4	0	0	5.0	12	6	6	0	3	2
Bob Keegan	10	8	3.53	30	20	2	142.2	131	62	56	22	39	36
Ellis Kinder	0	0	0.00	1	0	0	1.0	0	0	0	0	2	0
Paul LaPalme	1	4	3.35	35	0	7	40.1	35	16	15	5	20	19
Barry Latman	1	2	8.03	7	2	1	12.1	12	11	11	2	13	9
Jim McDonald	0	1	2.01	10	0	0	22.1	18	8	5	2	11	12
Stover McIlwain	0	0	0.00	1	0	0	1.0	2	0	0	0	1	0
Billy Pierce	20	12	3.26	37	34	2	257.0	228	98	93	18	80	171
Don Rudolph	1	0	2.25	5	0	0	12.0	6	3	3	2	2	2
Gerry Staley	5	1	2.06	47	0	7	105.0	95	27	24	7	36	44
Jim Wilson	15	8	3.48	30	29	0	201.2	189	85	78	22	73	100
Team totals	90	64	3.35	155	155	27	1401.2	1305	566	521	124	521	665

== Awards ==
- Nellie Fox, Gold Glove Award
- Minnie Miñoso, Gold Glove Award
- Sherm Lollar, Gold Glove Award

== Farm system ==
Level	Team	League	Manager
AAA	Indianapolis Indians	American Association	Andy Cohen
A	Colorado Springs Sky Sox	Western League	Ira Hutchinson
B	Davenport DavSox	Illinois–Indiana–Iowa League	Skeeter Scalzi
C	Duluth-Superior White Sox	Northern League	Joe Hauser
D	Dubuque Packers	Midwest League	George Noga
D	Holdrege White Sox	Nebraska State League	Frank Parenti
