= Art Houtteman =

American baseball player (1927–2003)

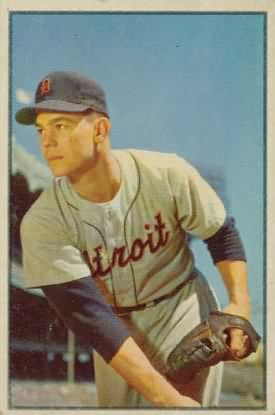
- Art Houtteman in 1953 with the Detroit Tigers
- Pitcher
- Born: August 7, 1927; Detroit, Michigan, U.S.
- Died: May 6, 2003 (aged 75); Rochester Hills, Michigan, U.S.
- Batted: Right Threw: Right

MLB debut
- April 29, 1945, for the Detroit Tigers

Last MLB appearance
- September 22, 1957, for the Baltimore Orioles

MLB statistics
- Win–loss record: 87–91
- Earned run average: 4.14
- Strikeouts: 639
- Stats at Baseball Reference

Teams
- Detroit Tigers (1945–1953); Cleveland Indians (1953–1957); Baltimore Orioles (1957)

Career highlights and awards
- All-Star (1950); World Series champion (1945)

Arthur Joseph Houtteman (August 7, 1927 – May 6, 2003) was an American right-handed pitcher in Major League Baseball who played for 12 seasons in the American League with the Detroit Tigers, Cleveland Indians and Baltimore Orioles. In 325 career games, Houtteman pitched 1,555 innings and posted a win–loss record of 87–91, with 78 complete games, 14 shutouts, and a 4.14 earned run average (ERA).

Known on the sandlot for his pitching motion, Houtteman was signed by scout Wish Egan in 1945 at 17 years of age. He was recruited by major league teams, and joined a Tigers pitching staff that had lost players to injuries and World War II. After moving between the major and minor leagues over the next few years, he was nearly killed in an automobile accident just before the 1949 season. Houtteman rebounded from his injuries and went on to win 15 games that season and made his only All-Star appearance in the following year.

He played three more seasons with the Tigers, then was sold to Cleveland, where he pitched for the pennant-winning Indians during their 1954 season. After losing his starting job, he played two more seasons with the Indians before he was bought by the Orioles, and he finished his final season in Major League Baseball with them. Houtteman ended his baseball career in the minor leagues and became a sales executive in Detroit. In 2003, Houtteman died at the age of 75.

== Early life ==
Art Houtteman was born in Detroit, Michigan, on August 7, 1927. He was a second-generation American citizen; his grandfather Joseph had emigrated from Belgium. The only son born to the Houtteman family, Art's father, also named Arthur, vowed that his son would become a major league player by the time he turned 17.

Houtteman played baseball at Detroit Catholic Central High School, where his pitching caught the attention of baseball scout Wish Egan, who praised Houtteman's "perfect pitching motion". Houtteman was signed by the Detroit Tigers late in 1944 and began to practice with the Tigers in spring training before the 1945 season along with fellow Detroit sandlot player Billy Pierce. He spent most of the 1945 season playing for Detroit's top minor league affiliate, the Buffalo Bisons. But injuries plagued the Tigers' pitching staff, and the 17-year-old Houtteman was called up by the parent club and began his major league career.

== Detroit Tigers ==
=== Hard Luck Houtteman ===
Due to Tiger pitching injuries, and with many top players still in the military late in World War II (Houtteman was too young for the draft), he made his major league debut on April 29. At 17 years old, he was the youngest player in the American League in the 1945 season before being optioned back to Buffalo, where on June 20 he threw seven no-hit innings, facing only 22 batters in the process, but lost the game 2–0 in extra innings. He also appeared in 13 games as a relief pitcher, and finished his minor league season with no wins, two losses and an ERA of 5.33 in just over 25 innings pitched.

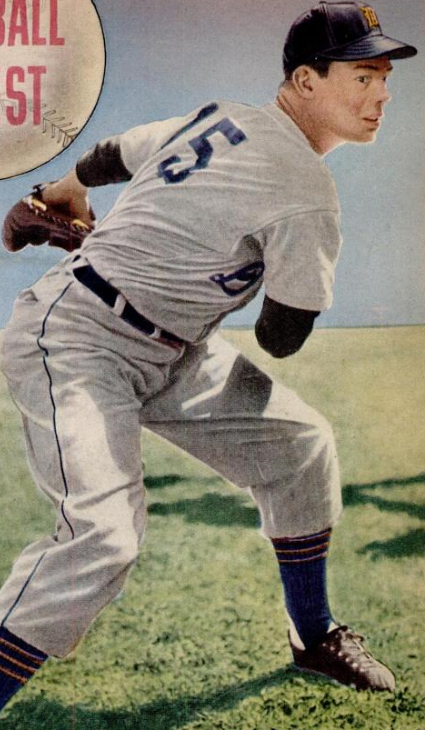
Houtteman on the cover of Baseball Digest

Houtteman was the youngest major leaguer in 1946 but played only one game for the Tigers that season, allowing eight runs and fifteen hits in eight innings. He spent most of 1946 in the minor leagues, finished at 16–13 and led the league in strikeouts. At the end of the season, Houtteman was named by six of the eight International League managers as the top pitching prospect in the league, leading the league in strikeouts with 150, pitching over 200 innings, finishing second in victories with 16, and amassing an 11–2 road record. Minor league third baseman Johnny Bero liked Houtteman's fielding ability so much that he called him "a fifth infielder."

Despite his newfound top prospect status Houtteman remained in Buffalo at the beginning of the 1947 season before being recalled to the Tigers in July. He was relegated to the bullpen for a time, and saw little action. But after Hal Newhouser, Fred Hutchinson and Dizzy Trout were used in two days, Tiger manager Steve O'Neill decided to start Houtteman against the Washington Senators for only the second start of his career. He tossed a five-hit shutout and Tiger general manager Billy Evans said, "In 40 years I've never seen a better pitching job by a first-year pitcher. We now know that Houtteman is really a big leaguer". He followed this with another five-hit victory against the Boston Red Sox, then pitched a three-hit shutout in September against the St. Louis Browns. He finished the season at 7–2 with a 3.42 ERA, seven complete games and two shutouts. His performance in 1947 caught the attention of New York Yankees star and future Hall of Famer Joe DiMaggio, who said of Houtteman and Bob Lemon, "They have more stuff and more pitching sense than any other young fellows I've seen come up in a long while".

The 1948 season began with Houtteman in the starting rotation. Things started off poorly, however, as Houtteman lost his first eight decisions. Two of the first five losses, though, were by one run, and he had little run support. The 0–8 start and lack of run support led to his being called "Hard Luck Houtteman" in the media. His first victory that year came against the Senators, in which he also drove in the winning run. After winning his next start, he defeated the Philadelphia Athletics allowing only five hits, and avoided another loss. But he then lost eight more games and finished the season at 2–16. His teammates and the media attributed this to bad luck rather than bad pitching, and still regarded him as a prime prospect. Newhouser said, "The kid has had nothing but bad luck since the season opened", while Fred Hutchinson said, "He shouldn't have lost more than three or four games had he gotten an even break". But his 4.66 ERA was only 0.06 higher than the major league average.

As 1949 spring training began, Houtteman was nearly killed. In Lakeland, Florida on March 10, while driving home from Florida Southern College, he crashed into a fruit truck fracturing his skull. Originally listed in critical condition (a priest stood by to administer the last rites in extremis), he recovered rapidly and was able to talk with his teammates two days after the accident, telling them, "I'll be able to pitch sooner than you". Within two weeks, the Tigers were optimistic that Houtteman would be able to play again by June. As a result of the injuries to Houtteman and Yankee star catcher Yogi Berra due to car accidents, Cleveland Indians playing manager Lou Boudreau banned his players from driving, forcing the soon-to-be world champions to ride chartered buses to exhibition games.

=== Ace of the staff ===
Houtteman marked his return to the Tigers' rotation on May 21, 1949, but he lost his first three decisions. His performance improved, however, as he began to earn more victories in the 1949 season. These wins included a five-hit 2–1 victory over the New York Yankees on July 23. Over the course of the season, Houtteman beat each American League club at least once and beat the Yankees and Red Sox three times. He finished the season with a 15–10 record, a 3.71 ERA, 13 complete games, and two shutouts. He was placed in most valuable player (MVP) voting, and received three points and finished tied for 22nd with teammate Virgil Trucks. The Philadelphia Sports Writers Association honored him as the year's "Most Courageous Athlete" because of his injury and comeback.

"I've always claimed Artie was a great pitcher. And he is. I'll bet you right now he's one of the first in the majors to win 20 games this year. He can't miss..."

— Teammate Ted Gray on Art Houtteman, The Sporting News, April 11, 1950.

As the 1950 season started, Houtteman was on a high note, pitching all of spring training without allowing a walk. He won his tenth game of the season on June 28, 1950, and became the first pitcher to hit the 10-win mark alongside Bob Lemon. After the game, he told an Associated Press reporter that he was just about convinced that Lady Luck had decided to give him a break after kicking him around for the past two or three years. Houtteman said, "I've been having a pretty good year and it sure feels good after some of the things that have happened to me". A week into July, Houtteman notched his eleventh victory, and only lost five games, in a 6–1 win against the St. Louis Browns. Just a few days later, Houtteman was named to the All-Star roster alongside fellow Tigers including Ted Gray, George Kell and Hoot Evers. In the 1950 All-Star game, Houtteman pitched three innings and batted once. He allowed one earned run, three hits, and one walk, his one earned run coming in the ninth inning on a Ralph Kiner home run that made the game go to extra innings.

Houtteman continued his successful season in the second half. On August 19, he faced the Browns and pitched a one-hitter, and faced the minimum 27 batters in the process. Houtteman ended the season just short of Ted Gray's prediction of 20 victories, and finished the season with a 19–12 record. He led the league in shutouts with four and was second in games started with 34, second in innings pitched with 274.2, third in wins, and third in complete games with 21. His ERA of 3.54 was good for fifth in the American League. He also earned six points in MVP voting, and finished tied for 24th. On October 2, the day after the 1950 season ended, Houtteman married Shelagh Marie Kelly. They met in New York's Catskill Mountains at Grossinger's Resort.

=== Military and return to Tigers ===
Before the start of the 1951 season, Houtteman was drafted into the United States Army. He had originally been classified 4F, or medically ineligible for the draft, because of a high school knee injury, and he felt that he was drafted only because he was a prominent athlete. He served in the heavy weapons division of the Army, where the roar of the big guns sent pains throbbing through Houtteman's head and gave him severe headaches, which doctors believed was a lingering effect of the skull fracture three years earlier. As a result, the Army reclassified Houtteman as not fully qualified for combat duty. This led to a medical discharge on September 15, 1951. Speaking of his time in the Army, Houtteman said, "I spent most of my time in the Army hospital. I did play a little ball at Camp Pickett", Virginia.

When he returned to the Tigers for spring training in 1952, Tigers' manager Red Rolfe noted, "Artie could be our best pitcher. He's the slump-breaking type, a guy who can throw a shutout once in a while". After a poor season without Houtteman in 1951, Rolfe predicted, "We'll be back in the first division this season because Art Houtteman is back. Houtteman makes us at least a dozen games better than [last year's Tigers' team]". Houtteman worked out in Detroit with pitcher Ted Gray over the winter before the 1952 season. Before the season started, Houtteman said, "It all depends on how I get off. I'm anxious to get into the season. My arm doesn't feel any different than it did in '50. I hope I can do even better than my last year". Houtteman also took number 21 on his uniform, the number he had when he first arrived with the Tigers, because he felt that it had given both him and teammate George Kell, who won a batting title with the number, good luck.

It appeared that "Hard Luck Houtteman" had returned as the 1952 season began. On April 2, 1952, just before the season started, Art lost his seven-month-old daughter in an automobile accident. In an April 26 matchup against the Cleveland Indians, with two outs in the bottom of the ninth, Houtteman was one out away from a no-hitter when he threw a fastball that was "supposed to sink" but did not, which Harry hit for a single. Houtteman said, "This was the only pitch I shook Ginsberg off the whole game", and for years afterwards, catcher Joe Ginsberg repeatedly said to Houtteman, "If you'd listened to me, I'd have you in the Hall of Fame". Detroit won the game by a score of 13–0. After losing his tenth game on June 22, manager Red Rolfe moved Houtteman out of the starting rotation and into the bullpen. He finished the year with an 8–20 record and a 4.36 ERA. His 20th loss came on September 21 against the Indians, and he became the first Tiger to lose 20 games since Bobo Newsom in 1941. His disappointing season led to the possibility of a trade, with general manager Charlie Gehringer acknowledging that Houtteman might be traded if the right offer came along.

Houtteman spent the offseason selling cars and making public appearances for the Detroit Tigers. During the 1953 season there were rumors of possible trades for Houtteman, with the Yankees proposing the possibility of trading Hank Bauer, an infielder, and Gil McDougald for Houtteman. Gehringer said of Houtteman's high trading price, "Art has always had good stuff—much too good to be a 20-game loser". That season, he was used as both a starter and reliever during the season. However, he lost six straight decisions, and by the middle of June had a 2–6 record and a 5.90 ERA.

== Cleveland Indians ==
On June 15, 1953, Houtteman was traded by the Tigers, along with Owen Friend, Joe Ginsberg and Bill Wight, to the Cleveland Indians for Ray Boone, Al Aber, Steve Gromek and Dick Weik. In July 1953, he returned to Detroit to pitch against the Tigers. At the time, Houtteman admitted he wanted to be traded. He said, "The fans are down on me and I'd do everybody a lot more good by being traded". He was not content with the Tigers and said there were times when it seemed he "couldn't wait to peel off his uniform after a game". As a result of Indians' pitching coach Mel Harder doing a "complete" overhaul, Houtteman was moved into the starting rotation, to replace Bob Feller. Houtteman finished the season in Cleveland with a 7–7 record, six complete games, one shutout, 109 innings pitched, and a 3.80 ERA.

At the start of the 1954 season, Houtteman's second daughter, Hollis Ann, was born on February 22. His pitching continued to improve under Mel Harder, who "got me to quit experimenting and to seek my natural delivery". The Indians used him when they could, especially in extra inning affairs. In the Indians' first six extra inning games, Houtteman was used three times. As a result, Houtteman finished the season with a career-high 11 complete games. The Indians also began to use Houtteman and Feller for doubleheaders with great success, as they had a 9–1 record after their first five doubleheaders. Houtteman finished the season with a 15–7 record, a 3.35 ERA, and 188 innings pitched. In the 1954 World Series with the Indians, he pitched two innings in Game 3 against the New York Giants, allowing one run and striking out one batter.

The 1955 season originally planned to use Houtteman as the number four pitcher on the starting rotation, as he had been the previous year. He saw himself remaining the fourth starter, and said, "Herb Score won't beat me out of the fourth starting job with the Indians" on April 11. However, he became a spot starter, as he lost his starting position to Score, the "most talked-about rookie in all the major league training camps". He split starting time with Bob Feller and finished the season with a 10–6 record, a 3.98 ERA, and three complete games. On December 29, 1955, Houtteman's first son, Jeff, was born with assistance from National Football League player Leon Hart, who was visiting Houtteman and helped deliver the baby.

Houtteman remained a reliever during the 1956 season. He continued to get trade offers in 1956, though, as the Chicago White Sox were willing to trade outfielder Jim Rivera for him. A three-team, nine-player deal involving Houtteman again becoming part of the White Sox along with George Strickland was also scrapped at the last second. Houtteman finished the 1956 season having only made 22 appearances on the mound, earning a 2–2 record. However, he had a high ERA of 6.56, his highest since 1946, when he made one appearance.

As the 1957 season neared, tension was running high. There was talk about Houtteman's being "in the doghouse", or out of favor with the team's management, during the 1956 season due to his lack of starts. According to sportswriter Hal Lebovitz, this was a result of the starting five for the Indians, including spot starter Feller, pitching very well during spring training. Houtteman was again brought up in trade rumors, along with Mike Garcia, since the Indians were loaded with pitching talent. When manager Al López was replaced by Kerby Farrell, Houtteman did, in fact, land in Farrell's doghouse. Farrell called him out front of his teammates after a poor performance in spring training. Houtteman pitched only four innings in three games for the Indians in 1957.

== Baltimore Orioles and minor leagues ==
Houtteman was put on the trading block before the 1957 season, but he drew no serious offers because Cleveland seemed desperate to trade him. On May 20, after playing three games for the Indians, Houtteman was sold to the Baltimore Orioles for an undisclosed amount. Hal Lebovitz called Houtteman "a pitcher of considerable promise but who somehow has yet to cash in on it", despite the fact that he was in his 12th and final major league season. During the 1957 season, Houtteman made four relief appearances before he was demoted to the Vancouver Mounties of the Pacific Coast League. He was brought back up to the major league roster to pitch on September 22, the final start of his major league career. In his final game, he pitched 2 1/3 innings, allowing three runs on seven hits and throwing two strikeouts.

Just before the 1958 season began, Houtteman was cut by the Orioles, ending his major league career. Shortly after being cut, he signed on with the Charleston Senators, a farm club of the Tigers. He had a 3.25 ERA and a 7–9 record for the Senators at the end of the 1958 season. In 1959, the Kansas City Athletics decided to give him a tryout. However, despite what was described as an "impressive" performance, they cut Houtteman as they were looking for more youthful arms. Houtteman signed with the Portland Beavers of the Pacific Coast League, and posted a 6–9 record with an ERA of 3.69 for the season. After the season ended, and after a third daughter, Sharon, was born in 1959, Houtteman announced his retirement from baseball at the age of 32.

== Later life ==
After retiring from professional baseball, Houtteman kept baseball a part of his life and became a sports reporter for a television station in Detroit for a time. He later became a sales executive with Paragon Steel in Detroit, where he worked until reaching the age of retirement. He was in attendance for the last game at Tiger Stadium in 1999. Houtteman died on May 6, 2003, at the age of 75, of an apparent heart attack at his home in Rochester Hills, Michigan.
