= 1957 Detroit Tigers season =

Major League Baseball season

1957 Detroit Tigers
- League: American League
- Ballpark: Briggs Stadium
- City: Detroit
- Record: 78–76 (.506)
- League place: 4th
- Owners: Fred Knorr, John Fetzer
- General managers: Walter Briggs, Jr., John McHale
- Managers: Jack Tighe
- Television: WJBK
- Radio: WKMH (Van Patrick, Mel Ott)

The 1957 Detroit Tigers season was a season in American baseball. The team finished fourth in the American League with a record of 78–76, 20 games behind the New York Yankees. The team scored 614 runs and allowed 614 runs for a run differential of zero.

== Offseason ==
- February 8, 1957: Jim Brideweser was purchased from the Tigers by the Baltimore Orioles.

== Regular season ==
- April 18, 1957: Roger Maris hit the first home run of his career. It came at Briggs Stadium in Detroit and was a grand slam off Tigers pitcher Jack Crimian.

=== Season standings ===
American League
Team	W	L	Pct.	GB	Home	Road
New York Yankees	98	56	.636	—	48‍–‍29	50‍–‍27
Chicago White Sox	90	64	.584	8	45‍–‍32	45‍–‍32
Boston Red Sox	82	72	.532	16	44‍–‍33	38‍–‍39
Detroit Tigers	78	76	.506	20	45‍–‍32	33‍–‍44
Baltimore Orioles	76	76	.500	21	42‍–‍33	34‍–‍43
Cleveland Indians	76	77	.497	21½	40‍–‍37	36‍–‍40
Kansas City Athletics	59	94	.386	38½	37‍–‍40	22‍–‍54
Washington Senators	55	99	.357	43	28‍–‍49	27‍–‍50

=== Record vs. opponents ===
1957 American League record Sources:
Team	BAL	BOS	CWS	CLE	DET	KCA	NYY	WSH
Baltimore	—	8–14	10–12–1	9–12	9–13	16–5–1	9–13	15–7
Boston	14–8	—	8–14	12–10	10–12	16–6	8–14	14–8
Chicago	12–10–1	14–8	—	14–8	11–11	14–8	8–14	17–5
Cleveland	12–9	10–12	8–14	—	11–11	11–11	9–13	15–7
Detroit	13–9	12–10	11–11	11–11	—	8–14	10–12	13–9
Kansas City	5–16–1	6–16	8–14	11–11	14–8	—	3–19	12–10
New York	13–9	14–8	14–8	13–9	12–10	19–3	—	13–9
Washington	7–15	8–14	5–17	7–15	9–13	10–12	9–13	—

=== Notable transactions ===
- June 14, 1957: Earl Torgeson was traded by the Tigers to the Chicago White Sox for Dave Philley.
- August 1, 1957: Johnny Groth was purchased by the Tigers from the Kansas City Athletics.
- August 27, 1957: Al Aber was selected off waivers from the Tigers by the Kansas City Athletics.

=== Roster ===
1957 Detroit Tigers
Roster
Pitchers: 22 Al Aber; 14 Jim Bunning; 11 Harry Byrd; 19 Jack Crimian; 18 Chuck Daniel; 21 Paul Foytack; 18 Steve Gromek; 44 Billy Hoeft; 17 Frank Lary; 41 Don Lee; 23 Duke Maas; 41 Joe Presko; 25 Bob Shaw; 19 Lou Sleater; 31 Jim Stump; 12 John Tsitouris; 29 Pete Wojey	Catchers: 2 Frank House; 10 Red Wilson; 12 Tom Yewcic; Infielders: 16 Reno Bertoia; 24 Frank Bolling; 8 Ray Boone; 26 Steve Boros; 1 Jack Dittmer; 5 Jim Finigan; 7 Harvey Kuenn; 9 Dave Philley; 11 Eddie Robinson; 27 Ron Samford; 28 George Thomas; 9 Earl Torgeson	Outfielders: 12 Mel Clark; 3 Johnny Groth; 6 Al Kaline; 4 Charlie Maxwell; 30 Karl Olson; 1,3 Bobo Osborne; 15 Jay Porter; 20 Jim Small; 29 Bill Taylor; 13 Bill Tuttle; Other batters: 9 Jack Phillips	Manager: 35 Jack Tighe; Coaches: 34 Billy Hitchcock; 33 Willis Hudlin; 32 Don Lund

== Player stats ==
=== Batting ===
==== Starters by position ====
Note: Pos = Position; G = Games played; AB = At bats; H = Hits; Avg. = Batting average; HR = Home runs; RBI = Runs batted in

Pos	Player	G	AB	H	Avg.	HR	RBI
C	Frank House	106	348	90	.259	7	36
1B	Ray Boone	129	462	126	.273	12	65
2B	Frank Bolling	146	576	149	.259	15	40
SS	Harvey Kuenn	151	624	173	.277	9	44
3B	Reno Bertoia	97	295	81	.275	4	28
LF	Charlie Maxwell	138	492	136	.276	24	82
CF	Bill Tuttle	133	451	113	.251	5	47
RF	Al Kaline	149	577	170	.295	23	90

==== Other batters ====
Note: G = Games played; AB = At bats; H = Hits; Avg. = Batting average; HR = Home runs; RBI = Runs batted in

Player	G	AB	H	Avg.	HR	RBI
Red Wilson	60	180	43	.239	3	13
Jim Finigan	64	174	47	.270	0	17
Dave Philley	65	173	49	.283	2	16
Jay Porter	58	140	35	.250	2	18
Johnny Groth	38	103	30	.291	0	16
Ron Samford	54	91	20	.220	0	5
Earl Torgeson	30	50	12	.240	1	5
Jim Small	36	42	9	.214	0	0
Steve Boros	24	41	6	.146	0	2
Bobo Osborne	11	27	4	.148	0	1
Bill Taylor	9	23	8	.348	1	3
Jack Dittmer	16	22	5	.227	0	2
Karl Olson	8	14	2	.143	0	1
Eddie Robinson	13	9	0	.000	0	0
Mel Clark	5	7	0	.000	0	1
Jack Phillips	1	1	0	.000	0	0
George Thomas	1	1	0	.000	0	0
Tom Yewcic	1	1	0	.000	0	0

=== Pitching ===
= Indicates league leader

==== Starting pitchers ====
Note: G = Games pitched; IP = Innings pitched; W = Wins; L = Losses; ERA = Earned run average; SO = Strikeouts

Player	G	IP	W	L	ERA	SO
Jim Bunning	45	267.1	20	8	2.69	182
Frank Lary	40	237.2	11	16	3.98	107
Paul Foytack	38	212.0	14	11	3.14	118
Billy Hoeft	34	207.0	9	11	3.48	111

==== Other pitchers ====
Note: G = Games pitched; IP = Innings pitched; W = Wins; L = Losses; ERA = Earned run average; SO = Strikeouts

Player	G	IP	W	L	ERA	SO
Duke Maas	45	219.1	10	14	3.28	116
Don Lee	11	38.2	1	3	4.66	19

==== Relief pitchers ====
Note: G = Games pitched; W = Wins; L = Losses; SV = Saves; ERA = Earned run average; SO = Strikeouts

Player	G	W	L	SV	ERA	SO
Harry Byrd	37	4	3	5	3.36	20
Lou Sleater	41	3	3	2	3.76	43
Al Aber	28	3	3	1	6.81	15
Steve Gromek	15	0	1	1	6.08	11
Joe Presko	7	1	1	0	1.64	3
Bob Shaw	7	0	1	0	7.45	4
Jim Stump	6	1	0	0	2.03	2
Jack Crimian	4	0	1	0	12.71	1
John Tsitouris	2	1	0	0	8.10	2
Pete Wojey	2	0	0	0	0.00	0
Chuck Daniel	1	0	0	0	7.71	2

== Farm system ==
Level	Team	League	Manager
AAA	Charleston Senators	American Association	Frank Skaff, Don Griffin and Bill Norman
AA	Birmingham Barons	Southern Association	Johnny Pesky
A	Augusta Tigers	Sally League	Bill Adair
B	Durham Bulls	Carolina League	Bob Mavis
C	Idaho Falls Russets	Pioneer League	Al Lakeman
D	Montgomery Rebels	Alabama–Florida League	Stubby Overmire
D	Orlando Flyers	Florida State League	Marland Doolittle and John Rose
D	Valdosta Tigers	Georgia–Florida League	Stan Wasiak
D	Erie Sailors	New York–Penn League	Chuck Kress

LEAGUE CHAMPIONS: Durham
