= 1957 Kansas City Athletics season =

1957 Kansas City Athletics
- League: American League
- Ballpark: Municipal Stadium
- City: Kansas City, Missouri
- Record: 59–94 (.386)
- League place: 7th
- Owners: Arnold Johnson
- General managers: George Selkirk
- Managers: Lou Boudreau, Harry Craft
- Radio: KMBC (Merle Harmon, Ed Edwards)

The 1957 Kansas City Athletics season, the third for the team in Kansas City and the 57th in MLB, involved the A's finishing seventh in the American League with a record of 59 wins and 94 losses, 38 1/2 games behind the American League Champion New York Yankees. The club drew 901,067 spectators, sixth in the league.

== Offseason ==
- October 15, 1956: Bob Cerv was purchased by the Athletics from the New York Yankees.
- February 19, 1957: Art Ditmar, Bobby Shantz, Jack McMahan, Wayne Belardi and players to be named later were traded by the Athletics to the New York Yankees for Irv Noren, Milt Graff, Mickey McDermott, Tom Morgan, Rip Coleman, Billy Hunter and a player to be named later. The Yankees completed their part of the deal by sending Jack Urban to the Athletics on April 5. The Athletics completed the deal by sending Curt Roberts to the Yankees on April 4 and Clete Boyer to the Yankees on June 4.
- Prior to 1957 season: Lou Klimchock was signed as an amateur free agent by the Athletics.

== Regular season ==
- First baseman Vic Power became the first black player to lead the American League in fielding percentage at any position. He led all American League first basemen with a .998 fielding average.
- Manager Lou Boudreau, in his third season at the helm, was fired August 4 with the Athletics standing at 36–67 (.350) and in eighth and last place in the American League. Coach Harry Craft, former skipper of the minor-league Kansas City Blues, succeeded Boudreau. Craft led the Athletics to a 23–27 mark, enabling them to escape the basement.

=== Season standings ===
American League
Team	W	L	Pct.	GB	Home	Road
New York Yankees	98	56	.636	—	48‍–‍29	50‍–‍27
Chicago White Sox	90	64	.584	8	45‍–‍32	45‍–‍32
Boston Red Sox	82	72	.532	16	44‍–‍33	38‍–‍39
Detroit Tigers	78	76	.506	20	45‍–‍32	33‍–‍44
Baltimore Orioles	76	76	.500	21	42‍–‍33	34‍–‍43
Cleveland Indians	76	77	.497	21½	40‍–‍37	36‍–‍40
Kansas City Athletics	59	94	.386	38½	37‍–‍40	22‍–‍54
Washington Senators	55	99	.357	43	28‍–‍49	27‍–‍50

=== Record vs. opponents ===
1957 American League record Sources:
Team	BAL	BOS	CWS	CLE	DET	KCA	NYY	WSH
Baltimore	—	8–14	10–12–1	9–12	9–13	16–5–1	9–13	15–7
Boston	14–8	—	8–14	12–10	10–12	16–6	8–14	14–8
Chicago	12–10–1	14–8	—	14–8	11–11	14–8	8–14	17–5
Cleveland	12–9	10–12	8–14	—	11–11	11–11	9–13	15–7
Detroit	13–9	12–10	11–11	11–11	—	8–14	10–12	13–9
Kansas City	5–16–1	6–16	8–14	11–11	14–8	—	3–19	12–10
New York	13–9	14–8	14–8	13–9	12–10	19–3	—	13–9
Washington	7–15	8–14	5–17	7–15	9–13	10–12	9–13	—

=== Notable transactions ===
- June 15, 1957: Ryne Duren, Jim Pisoni, and Harry Simpson were traded by the Athletics to the New York Yankees for Ralph Terry, Woodie Held, Billy Martin, and Bob Martyn.
- August 1, 1957: Johnny Groth was purchased from the Athletics by the Detroit Tigers.
- August 27, 1957: Al Aber was selected off waivers by the Athletics from the Detroit Tigers.

=== Roster ===
1957 Kansas City Athletics
Roster
Pitchers: 16 Al Aber; 21 Ed Blake; 28 George Brunet; 24 Wally Burnette; 15 Rip Coleman; 28 Glenn Cox; 26 Ryne Duren; 31 Ned Garver; 37 Tom Gorman; 12 Dave Hill; 28 Gene Host; 20 Alex Kellner; 19 Mickey McDermott; 17 Tom Morgan; 25 Arnie Portocarrero; 34 Hal Raether; 15 Harry Taylor; 26 Ralph Terry; 23 Virgil Trucks; 21 Jack Urban	Catchers: 9 Hal Smith; 22 Tim Thompson; Infielders: 12 Clete Boyer; 2 Joe DeMaestri; 4 Milt Graff; 1 Billy Hunter; 10 Héctor López; 4 Billy Martin; 11 Irv Noren; 7 Vic Power; 38 Harry Simpson	Outfielders: 33 Bob Cerv; 39 Johnny Groth; 38 Woodie Held; 32 Bob Martyn; 32 Jim Pisoni; 35 Lou Skizas; 30 Gus Zernial	Manager: 5 Lou Boudreau; 41 Harry Craft; Coaches: 40 Spud Chandler; 41 Harry Craft; 36 Jim Gleeson; 42 Bob Swift

== Player stats ==
= Indicates team leader

=== Batting ===
==== Starters by position ====
Note: Pos = Position; G = Games played; AB = At bats; H = Hits; Avg. = Batting average; HR = Home runs; RBI = Runs batted in

Pos	Player	G	AB	H	Avg.	HR	RBI
C	Hal Smith	107	360	109	.303	13	41
1B	Vic Power	129	467	121	.259	14	42
2B	Billy Hunter	116	319	61	.191	8	29
SS	Joe DeMaestri	135	461	113	.245	9	33
3B	Héctor López	121	391	115	.294	11	35
LF	Gus Zernial	131	437	103	.236	27	69
CF	Woodie Held	92	326	78	.239	20	50
RF	Lou Skizas	119	376	92	.245	18	44

==== Other batters ====
Note: G = Games played; AB = At bats; H = Hits; Avg. = Batting average; HR = Home runs; RBI = Runs batted in

Player	G	AB	H	Avg.	HR	RBI
Bob Cerv	124	345	94	.272	11	44
Billy Martin	73	265	68	.257	9	27
Tim Thompson	81	230	47	.204	7	19
Harry Simpson	50	179	53	.296	6	24
Irv Noren	81	160	34	.213	2	16
Milt Graff	56	155	28	.181	0	10
Bob Martyn	58	131	35	.267	1	12
Jim Pisoni	44	97	23	.237	3	12
Johnny Groth	55	59	15	.254	0	2
Clete Boyer	10	0	0	----	0	0

=== Pitching ===
==== Starting pitchers ====
Note: G = Games played; IP = Innings pitched; W = Wins; L = Losses; ERA = Earned run average; SO = Strikeouts

Player	G	IP	W	L	ERA	SO
Ned Garver	24	145.1	6	13	3.84	61
Alex Kellner	28	132.2	6	5	4.27	72
Ralph Terry	21	130.2	4	11	3.38	80

==== Other pitchers ====
Note: G = Games played; IP = Innings pitched; W = Wins; L = Losses; ERA = Earned run average; SO = Strikeouts

Player	G	IP	W	L	ERA	SO
Tom Morgan	46	143.2	9	7	4.64	32
Jack Urban	31	129.1	7	4	3.34	55
Tom Gorman	38	124.2	5	9	3.83	66
Arnie Portocarrero	33	114.2	4	9	3.92	42
Wally Burnette	38	113.0	7	12	4.30	57
Ryne Duren	14	42.2	0	3	5.27	37
Rip Coleman	19	41.0	0	7	5.93	15
Gene Host	11	23.2	0	2	7.23	9
George Brunet	4	11.1	0	1	5.56	3

==== Relief pitchers ====
Note: G = Games pitched; W = Wins; L = Losses; SV = Saves; ERA = Earned run average; SO = Strikeouts

Player	G	W	L	SV	ERA	SO
Virgil Trucks	48	9	7	7	3.03	55
Mickey McDermott	29	1	4	0	5.48	29
Glenn Cox	10	1	0	0	5.02	8
Al Aber	3	0	0	0	12.00	0
Harry Taylor	2	0	0	0	3.12	4
Dave Hill	2	0	0	0	27.00	1
Ed Blake	2	0	0	0	5.40	0
Hal Raether	1	0	0	0	9.00	0

== Awards and honors ==
=== League leaders ===
- Vic Power, American League leader, fielding percentage, first basemen (.998)

== Farm system ==
Level	Team	League	Manager
AAA	Buffalo Bisons	International League	Phil Cavarretta
AA	Little Rock Travelers	Southern Association	Al Evans
A	Columbia Gems	Sally League	Ernie White
B	Abilene Blue Sox	Big State League	Burl Storie
C	Crowley Millers	Evangeline League	Everett Robinson
C	Pocatello Athletics	Pioneer League	Vince Plumbo
D	Mattoon Athletics	Midwest League	Lew Krausse Sr.
D	Grand Island Athletics	Nebraska State League	Art Mazmanian
D	Seminole Oilers	Sooner State League	Lee Anthony

LEAGUE CHAMPIONS: Buffalo, Grand Island
