= 1957 Cleveland Indians season =

1957 Cleveland Indians
- League: American League
- Ballpark: Cleveland Municipal Stadium
- City: Cleveland, Ohio
- Owners: William R. Daley
- General managers: Hank Greenberg, Frank Lane
- Managers: Kerby Farrell
- Television: WEWS-TV (Ken Coleman, Jim Britt)
- Radio: WERE (Jimmy Dudley, Bob Neal)

The 1957 Cleveland Indians season was a season in American baseball. The team finished sixth in the American League with a record of 76–77, 21 1/2 games behind the New York Yankees

== Regular season ==
The Indians season was marked by change. Longtime Indians manager Al López took over as manager of the Chicago White Sox, and was replaced by Kerby Farrell, who had led the Indianapolis Indians to the 1956 Junior World Series crown. Eddie Stanky also became the Indians new infield coach.

Rookie Roger Maris, who was part of Farrell's Indianapolis team, joined the Indians as the team's starting center fielder. He made his major league debut against the Chicago White Sox on April 16. In 5 at bats, Maris had 3 hits. Two days later, Maris hit the first home run of his career, a grand slam off Tigers pitcher Jack Crimian at Briggs Stadium in Detroit.

In grimmer news, on May 7 Gil McDougald of the Yankees hit a pitch off Indians pitcher Herb Score in the first inning. The pitch would strike Score in the face.

=== Season standings ===
American League
Team	W	L	Pct.	GB	Home	Road
New York Yankees	98	56	.636	—	48‍–‍29	50‍–‍27
Chicago White Sox	90	64	.584	8	45‍–‍32	45‍–‍32
Boston Red Sox	82	72	.532	16	44‍–‍33	38‍–‍39
Detroit Tigers	78	76	.506	20	45‍–‍32	33‍–‍44
Baltimore Orioles	76	76	.500	21	42‍–‍33	34‍–‍43
Cleveland Indians	76	77	.497	21½	40‍–‍37	36‍–‍40
Kansas City Athletics	59	94	.386	38½	37‍–‍40	22‍–‍54
Washington Senators	55	99	.357	43	28‍–‍49	27‍–‍50

=== Record vs. opponents ===
1957 American League record Sources:
Team	BAL	BOS	CWS	CLE	DET	KCA	NYY	WSH
Baltimore	—	8–14	10–12–1	9–12	9–13	16–5–1	9–13	15–7
Boston	14–8	—	8–14	12–10	10–12	16–6	8–14	14–8
Chicago	12–10–1	14–8	—	14–8	11–11	14–8	8–14	17–5
Cleveland	12–9	10–12	8–14	—	11–11	11–11	9–13	15–7
Detroit	13–9	12–10	11–11	11–11	—	8–14	10–12	13–9
Kansas City	5–16–1	6–16	8–14	11–11	14–8	—	3–19	12–10
New York	13–9	14–8	14–8	13–9	12–10	19–3	—	13–9
Washington	7–15	8–14	5–17	7–15	9–13	10–12	9–13	—

=== Notable transactions ===
- August 24, 1957: Vito Valentinetti was purchased by the Indians from the Brooklyn Dodgers.
- September 21, 1957: Hoyt Wilhelm was selected off waivers by the Indians from the St. Louis Cardinals.

=== Roster ===
1957 Cleveland Indians
Roster
Pitchers: 28 Hank Aguirre; 30 Bob Alexander; 10 Bud Daley; 25 Mike Garcia; 6 Johnny Gray; 11 Art Houtteman; 21 Bob Lemon; 22 Cal McLish; 12 Don Mossi; 20 Ray Narleski; 34 Stan Pitula; 27 Herb Score; 29 Dick Tomanek; 26 Vito Valentinetti; 26 Hoyt Wilhelm; 24 Early Wynn	Catchers: 11 Dick Brown; 4 Jim Hegan; 18 Hal Naragon; 15 Russ Nixon; Infielders: 5 Joe Altobelli; 1 Bobby Ávila; 17 Chico Carrasquel; 6 Billy Harrell; 8 Kenny Kuhn; 9 Larry Raines; 6 Eddie Robinson; 16 Al Smith; 3 George Strickland; 26 Preston Ward; 23 Vic Wertz	Outfielders: 31 Jim Busby; 34 Joe Caffie; 38 Rocky Colavito; 32 Roger Maris; 35 Bob Usher; 36 Dick Williams; 14 Gene Woodling	Manager: 2 Kerby Farrell; Coaches: 43 Mel Harder (Pitching); 42 Red Kress (First Base); 40 Bill Lobe (Bullpen); 44 Eddie Stanky (Third Base)

== Player stats ==
=== Batting ===
==== Starters by position ====
Note: Pos = Position; G = Games played; AB = At bats; H = Hits; Avg. = Batting average; HR = Home runs; RBI = Runs batted in

Pos	Player	G	AB	H	Avg.	HR	RBI
C	Jim Hegan	58	148	32	.216	4	15
1B	Vic Wertz	144	515	145	.282	28	105
2B	Bobby Ávila	129	463	124	.268	5	48
SS	Chico Carrasquel	125	392	108	.276	8	57
3B	Al Smith	135	507	125	.247	11	49
LF	Gene Woodling	133	430	138	.321	19	78
CF	Roger Maris	116	358	84	.235	14	51
RF	Rocky Colavito	134	461	116	.252	25	84

==== Other batters ====
Note: G = Games played; AB = At bats; H = Hits; Avg. = Batting average; HR = Home runs; RBI = Runs batted in

Player	G	AB	H	Avg.	HR	RBI
Larry Raines	96	244	64	.262	2	16
Dick Williams	67	205	58	.283	6	17
George Strickland	89	201	47	.234	1	19
Russ Nixon	62	185	52	.281	2	18
Hal Naragon	57	121	31	.256	0	8
Dick Brown	34	114	30	.263	4	22
Joe Caffie	32	89	24	.270	3	10
Joe Altobelli	83	87	18	.207	0	9
Jim Busby	30	74	14	.189	2	4
Billy Harrell	22	57	15	.263	1	5
Kenny Kuhn	40	53	9	.170	0	5
Eddie Robinson	19	27	6	.222	1	3
Preston Ward	10	11	2	.182	0	0
Bob Usher	10	8	1	.125	0	0

=== Pitching ===
==== Starting pitchers ====
Note: G = Games pitched; IP = Innings pitched; W = Wins; L = Losses; ERA = Earned run average; SO = Strikeouts

Player	G	IP	W	L	ERA	SO
Early Wynn	40	263.0	14	17	4.31	184
Mike Garcia	38	211.1	12	8	3.75	110
Bob Lemon	21	117.1	6	11	4.60	45
Herb Score	5	36.0	2	1	2.00	39

==== Other pitchers ====
Note: G = Games pitched; IP = Innings pitched; W = Wins; L = Losses; ERA = Earned run average; SO = Strikeouts

Player	G	IP	W	L	ERA	SO
Don Mossi	36	159.0	11	10	4.13	97
Ray Narleski	46	154.1	11	5	3.09	93
Cal McLish	42	144.1	9	7	2.74	88
Bud Daley	34	87.1	2	8	4.43	54
Stan Pitula	23	59.2	2	2	4.98	17
Vito Valentinetti	11	23.2	2	2	4.94	9
Johnny Gray	7	20.0	1	3	5.85	3

==== Relief pitchers ====
Note: G = Games pitched; W = Wins; L = Losses; SV = Saves; ERA = Earned run average; SO = Strikeouts

Player	G	W	L	SV	ERA	SO
Dick Tomanek	34	2	1	0	5.68	55
Hank Aguirre	10	1	1	0	5.75	9
Bob Alexander	5	0	1	0	9.00	1
Art Houtteman	3	0	0	0	6.75	3
Hoyt Wilhelm	2	1	0	1	2.45	0

== Awards and honors ==
All-Star Game

== Farm system ==
Level	Team	League	Manager
Open	San Diego Padres	Pacific Coast League	Bob Elliott and Catfish Metkovich
AA	Mobile Bears	Southern Association	Don Heffner
A	Reading Indians	Eastern League	Jo-Jo White
B	Keokuk Kernels	Illinois–Indiana–Iowa League	Pinky May
C	Fargo-Moorhead Twins	Northern League	Frank Tornay and Ken Blackman
D	Cocoa Indians	Florida State League	Hank Majeski and Jim Gruzdis
D	North Platte Indians	Nebraska State League	Rudy York
D	Batavia Indians	New York–Penn League	Don Richmond

LEAGUE CHAMPIONS: Reading
