= Tom Patton (baseball) =

American baseball player (1935–2025)

- Catcher
- Born: September 5, 1935; Honey Brook, Pennsylvania, U.S.
- Died: September 8, 2025 (aged 90); Narvon, Pennsylvania, U.S.
- Batted: Right Threw: Right

MLB debut
- April 30, 1957, for the Baltimore Orioles

Last MLB appearance
- April 30, 1957, for the Baltimore Orioles

MLB statistics
- Batting average: .000
- Home runs: 0
- Runs batted in: 0
- Stats at Baseball Reference

Teams
- Baltimore Orioles (1957)

Tommy Allen Patton (September 5, 1935 – September 8, 2025) was an American professional baseball player whose career extended from 1953 through 1961. A catcher, Patton threw and batted right-handed, stood 5 feet 9 inches (1.75 m) tall, and weighed 185 pounds (84 kg).

== Biography ==
Patton played a single game in Major League Baseball for the 1957 Baltimore Orioles. On April 30, 1957, at Comiskey Park in Chicago, Patton relieved starting catcher Joe Ginsberg as part of a double switch. He went hitless in two at bats against the White Sox' Billy Pierce and played errorless ball in the field, handling six chances.

Patton had been drafted from his original organization, the St. Louis Cardinals, after the 1956 season. After his one-game stint, the Orioles sent Patton to their Texas League Double-A farm club, the San Antonio Missions, and he played the remainder of his professional career in minor league baseball in the Orioles' and Philadelphia Phillies' organizations. He batted .261 in 2,033 minor league at bats.

Patton died in Narvon, Pennsylvania, on September 8, 2025, at the age of 90.
