= Jim Stump =

American baseball player (1932–2015)

- Pitcher
- Born: February 10, 1932; Lansing, Michigan, U.S.
- Died: November 19, 2015 (aged 83); Lansing, Michigan, U.S.
- Batted: Right Threw: Right

MLB debut
- August 29, 1957, for the Detroit Tigers

Last MLB appearance
- September 26, 1959, for the Detroit Tigers

MLB statistics
- Win–loss record: 1–0
- Earned run average: 2.19
- Innings pitched: 24 2/3
- Stats at Baseball Reference

Teams
- Detroit Tigers (1957; 1959)

James Gilbert Stump (February 10, 1932 – November 19, 2015) was an American professional baseball player who appeared in 11 Major League Baseball games as a relief pitcher for the 1957 and 1959 Detroit Tigers. He threw and batted right-handed, stood 6 feet (1.8 m) tall and weighed 188 pounds (85 kg).

Stump graduated from Saint Mary's High School in his native Lansing, Michigan, and signed with the Tigers in 1951. His first two minor league seasons — sandwiched around a two-year military stint during the Korean War — were noteworthy, as he won 30 of 43 decisions (.698). After winning 14 games for the 1957 Birmingham Barons of the Double-A Southern Association, Stump made his Major League debut for the Tigers against the Boston Red Sox at Briggs Stadium, working one inning in relief and giving up a hit, a run and two bases on balls, including one to Ted Williams, in a 6–1 Tiger defeat. But, overall, Stump's first trial with Detroit was successful; he appeared in five more games played, won his only decision, and surrendered a total of only three earned runs in 13 1/3 innings, for a sparkling 2.08 earned run average.

The next two seasons, Stump put up identical 8–11 records with the Triple-A Charleston Senators, before receiving his second and final audition with the Tigers in 1959, pitching in 11 1/3 innings and posting another strong ERA (2.38). He played two more seasons of minor league ball — coincidentally, posting a third straight 8–11 season in the American Association in 1960 — and retired after the 1961 campaign.

During his two MLB trials, Stump worked in 242/3 innings pitched; he allowed 23 hits and 12 bases on balls, but only seven runs, six of them earned, for a career ERA of 2.19. He struck out eight.
