= 1957 New York Yankees season =

Season for the Major League Baseball team the New York Yankees

1957 New York Yankees
- American League champions
- League: American League
- Ballpark: Yankee Stadium
- City: New York City
- Record: 98–56 (.636)
- League place: 1st
- Owners: Dan Topping and Del Webb
- General managers: George Weiss
- Managers: Casey Stengel
- Television: WPIX (Mel Allen, Red Barber, Phil Rizzuto)
- Radio: WINS (AM) (Mel Allen, Red Barber, Phil Rizzuto)

The 1957 New York Yankees season was the 55th season for the team. The team finished with a record of 98–56 to win their 23rd pennant, finishing eight games ahead of the Chicago White Sox. New York was managed by Casey Stengel. The Yankees played their home games at Yankee Stadium.

In the World Series, the Yankees were defeated by the Milwaukee Braves in seven games. They lost the crucial seventh game in Yankee Stadium to the starting pitcher for the Braves, Lew Burdette, who was selected the World Series Most Valuable Player based on this and his other two victories in the Series.

Phil Rizzuto, the former team shortstop from the early 50s, joined the broadcast team for the radio and television broadcasts taking over from Jim Woods in what would be the first of many seasons as a Yankees broadcaster.

== Offseason ==
- October 15, 1956: Bob Cerv was purchased from the Yankees by the Kansas City Athletics.
- December 11, 1956: Charlie Silvera and cash were traded by the Yankees to the Chicago Cubs for a player to be named later. The Cubs completed the deal by sending Harry Chiti to the Yankees on December 14.
- February 19, 1957: Irv Noren, Milt Graff, Mickey McDermott, Tom Morgan, Rip Coleman, Billy Hunter, and a player to be named later were traded by the Yankees to the Kansas City Athletics for Art Ditmar, Bobby Shantz, Jack McMahan, Wayne Belardi, and players to be named later. The Yankees completed their part of the deal by sending Jack Urban to the Athletics on April 5. The Athletics completed the deal by sending Curt Roberts to the Yankees on April 4 and Clete Boyer to the Yankees on June 4.

== Regular season ==
=== Season standings ===
American League
| Team | W | L | Pct. | GB | Home | Road |
|---|---|---|---|---|---|---|
| New York Yankees | 98 | 56 | .636 | — | 48‍–‍29 | 50‍–‍27 |
| Chicago White Sox | 90 | 64 | .584 | 8 | 45‍–‍32 | 45‍–‍32 |
| Boston Red Sox | 82 | 72 | .532 | 16 | 44‍–‍33 | 38‍–‍39 |
| Detroit Tigers | 78 | 76 | .506 | 20 | 45‍–‍32 | 33‍–‍44 |
| Baltimore Orioles | 76 | 76 | .500 | 21 | 42‍–‍33 | 34‍–‍43 |
| Cleveland Indians | 76 | 77 | .497 | 21½ | 40‍–‍37 | 36‍–‍40 |
| Kansas City Athletics | 59 | 94 | .386 | 38½ | 37‍–‍40 | 22‍–‍54 |
| Washington Senators | 55 | 99 | .357 | 43 | 28‍–‍49 | 27‍–‍50 |

=== Record vs. opponents ===
1957 American League record Sources:
| Team | BAL | BOS | CWS | CLE | DET | KCA | NYY | WSH |
|---|---|---|---|---|---|---|---|---|
| Baltimore | — | 8–14 | 10–12–1 | 9–12 | 9–13 | 16–5–1 | 9–13 | 15–7 |
| Boston | 14–8 | — | 8–14 | 12–10 | 10–12 | 16–6 | 8–14 | 14–8 |
| Chicago | 12–10–1 | 14–8 | — | 14–8 | 11–11 | 14–8 | 8–14 | 17–5 |
| Cleveland | 12–9 | 10–12 | 8–14 | — | 11–11 | 11–11 | 9–13 | 15–7 |
| Detroit | 13–9 | 12–10 | 11–11 | 11–11 | — | 8–14 | 10–12 | 13–9 |
| Kansas City | 5–16–1 | 6–16 | 8–14 | 11–11 | 14–8 | — | 3–19 | 12–10 |
| New York | 13–9 | 14–8 | 14–8 | 13–9 | 12–10 | 19–3 | — | 13–9 |
| Washington | 7–15 | 8–14 | 5–17 | 7–15 | 9–13 | 10–12 | 9–13 | — |

=== Notable transactions ===
- May 26, 1957: Tommy Lasorda was purchased from the Yankees by the Brooklyn Dodgers.
- June 15, 1957: Ralph Terry, Woodie Held, Billy Martin, and Bob Martyn were traded by the Yankees to the Kansas City Athletics for Ryne Duren, Jim Pisoni, and Harry Simpson.
- September 10, 1957: Bobby Del Greco was purchased by the Yankees from the Chicago Cubs.

=== Roster ===
1957 New York Yankees
Roster
| Pitchers: 23 Tommy Byrne; 24 Al Cicotte; 28 Art Ditmar; 16 Whitey Ford; 55 Bob Grim; 53 Johnny Kucks; 18 Don Larsen; 21 Sal Maglie; 30 Bobby Shantz; 47 Tom Sturdivant; 21 Ralph Terry; 19 Bob Turley | Catchers: 8 Yogi Berra; 39 Darrell Johnson; Infielders: 6 Andy Carey; 42 Jerry Coleman; 15 Joe Collins; 11 Jerry Lumpe; 1 Billy Martin; 12 Gil McDougald; 29 Bobby Richardson; 14 Bill Skowron | Outfielders: 9 Hank Bauer; 25 Zeke Bella; 27 Bobby Del Greco; 32 Elston Howard; 34 Tony Kubek; 7 Mickey Mantle; 36 Harry Simpson; 17 Enos Slaughter; Other batters: 12 Woodie Held | Manager: 37 Casey Stengel; Coaches: 2 Frankie Crosetti; 33 Randy Gumpert; 33 Charlie Keller; 31 Jim Turner |

== Player stats ==
| = Indicates team leader |

| = Indicates league leader |

=== Batting ===
==== Starters by position ====
Note: Pos = Position; G = Games played; AB = At bats; H = Hits; Avg. = Batting average; HR = Home runs; RBI = Runs batted in

| Pos | Player | G | AB | H | Avg. | HR | RBI |
|---|---|---|---|---|---|---|---|
| C | Yogi Berra | 134 | 482 | 121 | .251 | 24 | 82 |
| 1B | Bill Skowron | 122 | 457 | 139 | .304 | 17 | 88 |
| 2B | Bobby Richardson | 97 | 305 | 78 | .256 | 0 | 19 |
| 3B | Andy Carey | 85 | 247 | 63 | .255 | 6 | 33 |
| SS | Gil McDougald | 141 | 539 | 156 | .289 | 13 | 62 |
| LF | Elston Howard | 110 | 356 | 90 | .253 | 8 | 44 |
| CF | Mickey Mantle | 144 | 474 | 173 | .365 | 34 | 94 |
| RF | Hank Bauer | 137 | 479 | 124 | .259 | 18 | 65 |

==== Other batters ====
Note: G = Games played; AB = At bats; H = Hits; Avg. = Batting average; HR = Home runs; RBI = Runs batted in

| Player | G | AB | H | Avg. | HR | RBI |
|---|---|---|---|---|---|---|
| Tony Kubek | 127 | 431 | 128 | .297 | 3 | 39 |
| Harry Simpson | 75 | 224 | 56 | .250 | 7 | 39 |
| Enos Slaughter | 96 | 209 | 53 | .254 | 5 | 34 |
| Jerry Coleman | 72 | 157 | 42 | .268 | 2 | 12 |
| Joe Collins | 79 | 149 | 30 | .201 | 2 | 10 |
| Billy Martin | 43 | 145 | 35 | .241 | 1 | 12 |
| Jerry Lumpe | 40 | 103 | 35 | .340 | 0 | 11 |
| Darrell Johnson | 21 | 46 | 10 | .217 | 1 | 8 |
| Zeke Bella | 5 | 10 | 1 | .100 | 0 | 0 |
| Bobby Del Greco | 8 | 7 | 3 | .429 | 0 | 0 |
| Woodie Held | 1 | 1 | 0 | .000 | 0 | 0 |

=== Pitching ===
==== Starting pitchers ====
Note: G = Games pitched; IP = Innings pitched; W = Wins; L = Losses; ERA = Earned run average; SO = Strikeouts

| Player | G | IP | W | L | ERA | SO |
|---|---|---|---|---|---|---|
| Tom Sturdivant | 28 | 201.2 | 16 | 6 | 2.54 | 118 |
| Bob Turley | 32 | 176.1 | 13 | 6 | 2.71 | 152 |
| Bobby Shantz | 30 | 173.0 | 11 | 5 | 2.45 | 72 |
| Don Larsen | 27 | 139.2 | 10 | 4 | 3.74 | 81 |
| Whitey Ford | 24 | 129.1 | 11 | 5 | 2.57 | 84 |

==== Other pitchers ====
Note: G = Games pitched; IP = Innings pitched; W = Wins; L = Losses; ERA = Earned run average; SO = Strikeouts

| Player | G | IP | W | L | ERA | SO |
|---|---|---|---|---|---|---|
| Johnny Kucks | 37 | 179.1 | 8 | 10 | 3.56 | 78 |
| Art Ditmar | 46 | 127.1 | 8 | 3 | 3.25 | 64 |
| Sal Maglie | 6 | 26.0 | 2 | 0 | 1.73 | 9 |
| Ralph Terry | 7 | 20.2 | 1 | 1 | 3.05 | 7 |

==== Relief pitchers ====
Note: G = Games pitched; W = Wins; L = Losses; SV = Saves; ERA = Earned run average; SO = Strikeouts

| Player | G | W | L | SV | ERA | SO |
|---|---|---|---|---|---|---|
| Bob Grim | 46 | 12 | 8 | 19 | 2.63 | 52 |
| Tommy Byrne | 30 | 4 | 6 | 2 | 4.36 | 9 |
| Al Cicotte | 20 | 2 | 2 | 2 | 3.03 | 36 |

== 1957 World Series ==
NL Milwaukee Braves (4) vs. AL New York Yankees (3)

| Game | Score | Date | Location | Attendance |
|---|---|---|---|---|
| 1 | Braves – 1, Yankees – 3 | October 2 | Yankee Stadium | 69,476 |
| 2 | Braves – 4, Yankees – 2 | October 3 | Yankee Stadium | 65,202 |
| 3 | Yankees – 12, Braves – 3 | October 5 | Milwaukee County Stadium | 45,804 |
| 4 | Yankees – 5, Braves – 7 (10 innings) | October 6 | Milwaukee County Stadium | 45,804 |
| 5 | Yankees – 0, Braves – 1 | October 7 | Milwaukee County Stadium | 45,811 |
| 6 | Braves – 2, Yankees – 3 | October 9 | Yankee Stadium | 61,408 |
| 7 | Braves – 5, Yankees – 0 | October 10 | Yankee Stadium | 61,207 |

== Awards and honors ==
- Mickey Mantle, American League MVP

All-Star Game

== Farm system ==
| Level | Team | League | Manager |
|---|---|---|---|
| AAA | Denver Bears | American Association | Ralph Houk |
| AAA | Richmond Virginians | International League | Eddie Lopat |
| AA | New Orleans Pelicans | Southern Association | Peanuts Lowrey |
| A | Binghamton Triplets | Eastern League | Steve Souchock |
| B | Peoria Chiefs | Illinois–Indiana–Iowa League | Vern Hoscheit |
| C | Modesto Reds | California League | Dee Phillips |
| C | Alexandria Aces | Evangeline League | Ken Silvestri |
| D | St. Petersburg Saints | Florida State League | Nesbit Wilson |
| D | Kearney Yankees | Nebraska State League | Randy Gumpert |
| D | Greenville Majors | Sooner State League | Tom Gott |

LEAGUE CHAMPIONS: Denver, Alexandria
