= Bill Wight =

American baseball player (1922–2007)

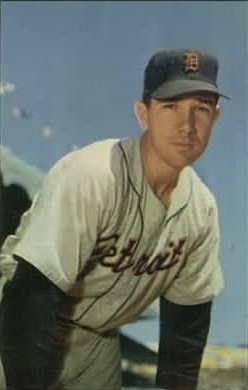
- Wight, c. 1953
- Pitcher
- Born: April 12, 1922; Rio Vista, California, U.S.
- Died: May 17, 2007 (aged 85); Mount Shasta, California, U.S.
- Batted: Left Threw: Left

MLB debut
- April 17, 1946, for the New York Yankees

Last MLB appearance
- September 21, 1958, for the St. Louis Cardinals

MLB statistics
- Win–loss record: 77–99
- Earned run average: 3.95
- Strikeouts: 574
- Stats at Baseball Reference

Teams
- New York Yankees (1946–1947); Chicago White Sox (1948–1950); Boston Red Sox (1951–1952); Detroit Tigers (1952–1953); Cleveland Indians (1953, 1955); Baltimore Orioles (1955–1957); Cincinnati Redlegs (1958); St. Louis Cardinals (1958)

William Robert Wight (April 12, 1922 – May 17, 2007) was an American pitcher in Major League Baseball (MLB) who played from 1946 through 1958 for the New York Yankees (1946–47), Chicago White Sox (1948–50), Boston Red Sox (1951–52), Detroit Tigers (1952–53), Cleveland Indians (1953, 1955), Baltimore Orioles (1955–57), Cincinnati Reds (1958) and St. Louis Cardinals (1958). Listed at 6 feet 1 inch (1.85 m) tall and 180 pounds (82 kg), Wight batted and threw left-handed. He was born in Rio Vista, California.

Wight graduated from Oakland's McClymonds High School and entered professional baseball in the Yankees' organization in 1941. He served in the United States Navy during World War II and missed three full seasons (1943–45). His best MLB season was 1949, when he set or equaled career bests in games won (15), complete games (14), shutouts (three), and innings pitched (245), hurling for a sixth-place White Sox team that lost 91 of its 154 games. On June 15, 1953, Wight was traded by the Tigers, along with Owen Friend, Joe Ginsberg and Art Houtteman, to the Cleveland Indians for Ray Boone, Al Aber, Steve Gromek and Dick Weik.

In a big-league career that lasted all or parts of 12 seasons, Wight posted a 77–99 won–lost record with 574 strikeouts and a 3.95 ERA in 347 appearances, including 198 starts, 66 complete games, 15 shutouts and eight saves in 1,563 innings of work.

Wight scouted for the Houston Colt .45s/Astros and Atlanta Braves for 37 years after his active career ended — signing Baseball Hall of Fame second baseman Joe Morgan for Houston in 1962. He died in Mount Shasta, California, at the age of 85.
