= Chuck Daniel =

American baseball player (1933–2008)

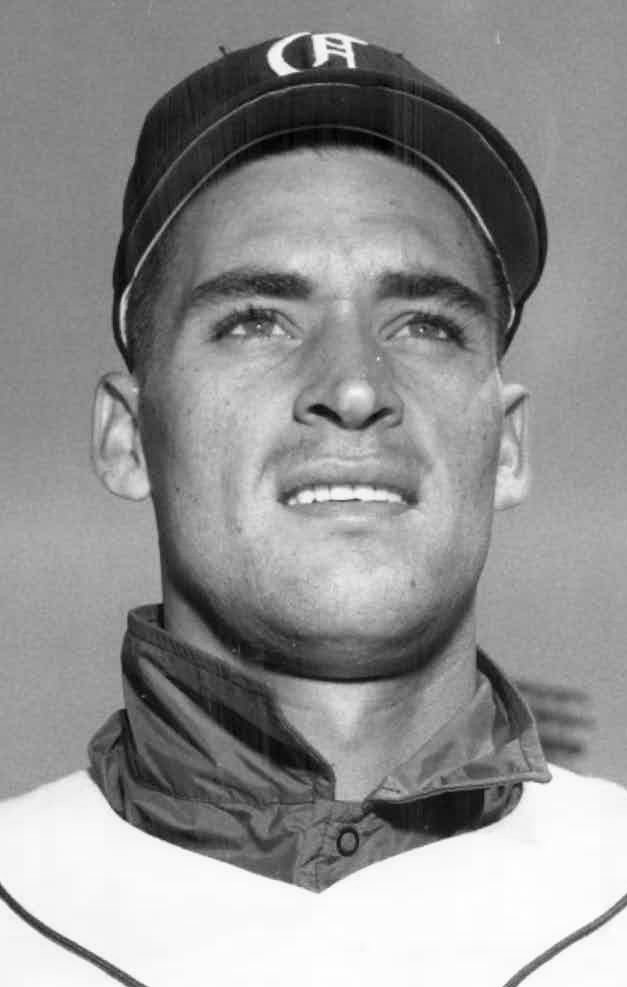
- Pitcher
- Born: September 17, 1933; Bluffton, Arkansas, U.S.
- Died: January 1, 2008 (aged 74); Hot Springs, Arkansas, U.S.
- Batted: Right Threw: Right

MLB debut
- September 21, 1957, for the Detroit Tigers

Last MLB appearance
- September 21, 1957, for the Detroit Tigers

MLB statistics
- Win–loss record: 0–0
- Earned run average: 7.71
- Strikeouts: 2
- Stats at Baseball Reference

Teams
- Detroit Tigers (1957)

Charles Edward Daniel (September 17, 1933 – January 1, 2008) was an American professional baseball player who appeared in one game as a relief pitcher in Major League Baseball for the Detroit Tigers during the 1957 season. Listed at 6 feet 2 inches (1.88 m) tall and 195 pounds (88 kg), he batted and threw right-handed.

Daniel was born in Bluffton, Arkansas, and attended the College of the Ozarks. His pro career (1953; 1956–1961) was interrupted by military service in 1954 and 1955. His major league tenure, statistically speaking, was only slightly different from that of Moonlight Graham's. After spending 1957 with the Tigers' Triple-A affiliate, the Charleston Senators, he was recalled in September when rosters expanded to 40 men. On September 21, 1957, Daniel faced the Kansas City Athletics as a second-inning replacement for starter Jim Bunning with Detroit trailing 4–0 at Municipal Stadium. He held the Athletics off the scoreboard for his first two full innings of work, but in his third frame, he allowed a double to Joe DeMaestri and a two-run home run to Gus Zernial before getting the final out; he was replaced by pinch hitter Jay Porter in the Tigers' half of the sixth inning. The Tigers fell 6–3, with Bunning charged with the defeat. In his appearance, Daniel gave up two runs, three hits and no walks to go with a pair of strikeouts. In 2 1/3 innings pitched, he posted a 7.71 ERA and never appeared in an MLB game after that day. He played for the Double-A Little Rock Travelers in his native state for the last two years of his pitching career.

Daniel died in Hot Springs Village, Arkansas, on New Year's Day 2008 at the age of 74. Married to Rita Daniel, he was the father to Robin Daniel, Denise Baker, and Thomas Daniel. He is also a grandfather to Jessica Christianson, Hunter Daniel, Page Daniel, Austin Baker, Nate Baker (a pitcher who played professional baseball in the Pittsburgh Pirates' organization from 2009 to 2014), Cameron Baker, Keaton Baker, Anna Daniel, Charles Daniel, and Melanie Daniel. He was also a great-grandfather to Rita Christianson.
