= 1957 Boston Red Sox season =

Major League Baseball season

1957 Boston Red Sox
- League: American League
- Ballpark: Fenway Park
- City: Boston, Massachusetts
- Record: 82–72 (.532)
- League place: 3rd
- Owners: Tom Yawkey
- President: Tom Yawkey
- General managers: Joe Cronin
- Managers: Pinky Higgins
- Television: WBZ-TV, Ch. 4 and WNAC-TV, Ch. 7
- Radio: WHDH-AM 850 (Curt Gowdy, Don Gillis, Bob Murphy, Bill Crowley)
- Stats: ESPN.com; Baseball Reference

The 1957 Boston Red Sox season was the 57th season in the franchise's Major League Baseball history. The Red Sox finished third in the American League (AL) with a record of 82 wins and 72 losses, 16 games behind the New York Yankees.

== Offseason ==
- December 3, 1956: Bob Smith was drafted from the Red Sox by the St. Louis Cardinals in the 1956 rule 5 draft.

== Regular season ==
=== Season standings ===
American League
Team	W	L	Pct.	GB	Home	Road
New York Yankees	98	56	.636	—	48‍–‍29	50‍–‍27
Chicago White Sox	90	64	.584	8	45‍–‍32	45‍–‍32
Boston Red Sox	82	72	.532	16	44‍–‍33	38‍–‍39
Detroit Tigers	78	76	.506	20	45‍–‍32	33‍–‍44
Baltimore Orioles	76	76	.500	21	42‍–‍33	34‍–‍43
Cleveland Indians	76	77	.497	21½	40‍–‍37	36‍–‍40
Kansas City Athletics	59	94	.386	38½	37‍–‍40	22‍–‍54
Washington Senators	55	99	.357	43	28‍–‍49	27‍–‍50

=== Record vs. opponents ===
1957 American League record Sources:
Team	BAL	BOS	CWS	CLE	DET	KCA	NYY	WSH
Baltimore	—	8–14	10–12–1	9–12	9–13	16–5–1	9–13	15–7
Boston	14–8	—	8–14	12–10	10–12	16–6	8–14	14–8
Chicago	12–10–1	14–8	—	14–8	11–11	14–8	8–14	17–5
Cleveland	12–9	10–12	8–14	—	11–11	11–11	9–13	15–7
Detroit	13–9	12–10	11–11	11–11	—	8–14	10–12	13–9
Kansas City	5–16–1	6–16	8–14	11–11	14–8	—	3–19	12–10
New York	13–9	14–8	14–8	13–9	12–10	19–3	—	13–9
Washington	7–15	8–14	5–17	7–15	9–13	10–12	9–13	—

=== Opening Day lineup ===
11	Frank Malzone	3B
35	Billy Klaus	SS
9	Ted Williams	LF
25	Dick Gernert	1B
37	Jimmy Piersall	CF
38	Gene Stephens	RF
24	Gene Mauch	2B
22	Sammy White	C
23	Tom Brewer	P

=== Notable transactions ===
- April 29, 1957: Faye Throneberry, Milt Bolling and Russ Kemmerer were traded by the Red Sox to the Washington Senators for Bob Chakales and Dean Stone.

=== Roster ===
1957 Boston Red Sox
Roster
Pitchers: 15 Frank Baumann; 23 Tom Brewer; 40 Bob Chakales; 14 Ike Delock; 20 Mike Fornieles; 28 Russ Kemmerer; 20 Russ Meyer; 29 Rudy Minarcin; 21 Willard Nixon; 19 Bob Porterfield; 39 Dave Sisler; 36 Jack Spring; 28 Dean Stone; 18 Frank Sullivan; 27 George Susce; 26 Murray Wall	Catchers: 8 Pete Daley; 16 Haywood Sullivan; 22 Sammy White; Infielders: 7 Ken Aspromonte; 1 Billy Consolo; 25 Dick Gernert; 35 Billy Klaus; 12 Ted Lepcio; 11 Frank Malzone; 24 Gene Mauch; 6 Mickey Vernon; 3 Norm Zauchin	Outfielders: 4 Jackie Jensen; 41 Marty Keough; 37 Jimmy Piersall; 38 Gene Stephens; 9 Ted Williams; Other batters: 2 Milt Bolling; 10 Billy Goodman; 26 Faye Throneberry	Manager: 5 Pinky Higgins; Coaches: 32 Del Baker (First base); 31 Jack Burns (Third base); 33 Dave Ferriss (Pitching); 34 Paul Schreiber (Hitting)

== Player stats ==
= Indicates team leader

= Indicates league leader

=== Batting ===
==== Starters by position ====
Note: Pos = Position; G = Games played; AB = At bats; H = Hits; Avg. = Batting average; HR = Home runs; RBI = Runs batted in

Pos	Player	G	AB	H	Avg.	HR	RBI
C	Sammy White	111	340	73	.215	3	31
1B	Dick Gernert	99	316	75	.237	14	58
2B	Ted Lepcio	79	232	56	.241	9	37
SS	Billy Klaus	127	477	120	.252	10	42
3B	Frank Malzone	153	634	185	.292	15	103
LF	Ted Williams	132	420	163	.388	38	87
CF	Jim Piersall	151	609	159	.261	19	63
RF	Jackie Jensen	145	544	153	.281	23	103

==== Other batters ====
Note: G = Games played; AB = At bats; H = Hits; Avg. = Batting average; HR = Home runs; RBI = Runs batted in

Player	G	AB	H	Avg.	HR	RBI
Mickey Vernon	102	270	65	.241	7	38
Gene Mauch	65	222	60	.270	2	28
Billy Consolo	68	196	53	.270	4	19
Pete Daley	78	191	43	.225	3	25
Gene Stephens	120	173	46	.266	3	26
Norm Zauchin	52	91	24	.264	3	14
Ken Aspromonte	24	78	21	.269	0	4
Marty Keough	9	17	1	.059	0	0
Billy Goodman	18	16	1	.063	0	0
Haywood Sullivan	2	1	0	.000	0	0
Faye Throneberry	1	1	0	.000	0	0
Milt Bolling	1	1	0	.000	0	0

=== Pitching ===
==== Starting pitchers ====
Note: G = Games pitched; IP = Innings pitched; W = Wins; L = Losses; ERA = Earned run average; SO = Strikeouts

Player	G	IP	W	L	ERA	SO
Frank Sullivan	31	240.2	14	11	2.73	127
Tom Brewer	32	238.1	16	13	3.85	128
Willard Nixon	29	191.0	12	13	3.68	96
Mike Fornieles	25	125.1	8	7	3.52	64
Dave Sisler	22	122.1	7	8	4.71	55

==== Other pitchers ====
Note: G = Games pitched; IP = Innings pitched; W = Wins; L = Losses; ERA = Earned run average; SO = Strikeouts

Player	G	IP	W	L	ERA	SO
Bob Porterfield	28	102.1	4	4	4.05	28
George Susce	29	88.1	7	3	4.28	40
Dean Stone	17	51.1	1	3	5.08	32
Frank Baumann	4	12.0	1	0	3.75	7
Russ Meyer	2	5.0	0	0	5.40	1

==== Relief pitchers ====
Note: G = Games pitched; W = Wins; L = Losses; SV = Saves; ERA = Earned run average; SO = Strikeouts

Player	G	W	L	SV	ERA	SO
Ike Delock	49	9	8	11	3.83	62
Rudy Minarcin	26	0	0	2	4.43	20
Bob Chakales	18	0	2	3	8.16	16
Murray Wall	11	3	0	1	3.33	13
Russ Kemmerer	1	0	0	0	4.50	1
Jack Spring	1	0	0	0	0.00	2

== Awards and honors ==
- Ted Williams, Associated Press Athlete of the Year.
- Frank Malzone, Gold Glove.

== Farm system ==
Level	Team	League	Manager
Open	San Francisco Seals	Pacific Coast League	Joe Gordon
AA	Oklahoma City Indians	Texas League	Sheriff Robinson
A	Albany Senators	Eastern League	Eddie Popowski
B	Greensboro Patriots	Carolina League	Len Okrie
D	Lafayette Red Sox	Midwest League	Ken Deal
D	Lexington Red Sox	Nebraska State League	Jack Kaiser
D	Corning Red Sox	New York–Penn League	Elmer Yoter

LEAGUE CHAMPIONS: San Francisco
