= 1957 Washington Senators season =

1957 Washington Senators
- League: American League
- Ballpark: Griffith Stadium
- City: Washington, D.C.
- Record: 55–99 (.357)
- League place: 8th
- Owners: Calvin Griffith (majority owner, with Thelma Griffith Haynes)
- General managers: Calvin Griffith
- Managers: Chuck Dressen and Cookie Lavagetto
- Television: WTTG
- Radio: WWDC (FM) (Chuck Thompson, Bob Wolff)

The 1957 Washington Senators won 55 games and lost 99 in their 57th year in the American League, and finished in eighth place, attracting 457,079 spectators to Griffith Stadium, last in the major leagues. Chuck Dressen began the year as their manager, but after the Senators dropped 16 of their first 20 games, Dressen was replaced by Cookie Lavagetto on May 7. Lavagetto, a longtime aide to Dressen, went 51–83 for the rest of the year, but would remain at the club's helm into June 1961, its first season as the Minnesota Twins.

The 1957 Senators set an MLB record which still stands for the fewest stolen bases by a team in a season, with only 13. Washington left fielder Roy Sievers set a new team record with 42 home runs to the lead the Junior Circuit, as he benefited from Griffith Stadium's shorter dimensions in left and left-center field, which had been implemented before the 1956 campaign.

The 1957 season also marked the first time that Washington's American League franchise had used Senators as its official nickname since 1904. For 52 years (1905–1956), the team called itself the Nationals, with Senators as an unofficial, but widely used, secondary appellation. From 1957 on, headline writers and baseball journalists would continue to use Nats as an accepted alternative name for both this Senators franchise and its expansion-era successor, the Senators of 1961–1971, until the "new Senators" relocated to Dallas–Fort Worth after the 1971 campaign. Since 2005, the Nationals name is the official identity of Washington's National League franchise formerly called the Montreal Expos.

== Offseason ==
- Prior to 1957 season: Choo-Choo Coleman was released by the Senators.

== Regular season ==
=== Season standings ===
American League
Team	W	L	Pct.	GB	Home	Road
New York Yankees	98	56	.636	—	48‍–‍29	50‍–‍27
Chicago White Sox	90	64	.584	8	45‍–‍32	45‍–‍32
Boston Red Sox	82	72	.532	16	44‍–‍33	38‍–‍39
Detroit Tigers	78	76	.506	20	45‍–‍32	33‍–‍44
Baltimore Orioles	76	76	.500	21	42‍–‍33	34‍–‍43
Cleveland Indians	76	77	.497	21½	40‍–‍37	36‍–‍40
Kansas City Athletics	59	94	.386	38½	37‍–‍40	22‍–‍54
Washington Senators	55	99	.357	43	28‍–‍49	27‍–‍50

=== Record vs. opponents ===
1957 American League record Sources:
Team	BAL	BOS	CWS	CLE	DET	KCA	NYY	WSH
Baltimore	—	8–14	10–12–1	9–12	9–13	16–5–1	9–13	15–7
Boston	14–8	—	8–14	12–10	10–12	16–6	8–14	14–8
Chicago	12–10–1	14–8	—	14–8	11–11	14–8	8–14	17–5
Cleveland	12–9	10–12	8–14	—	11–11	11–11	9–13	15–7
Detroit	13–9	12–10	11–11	11–11	—	8–14	10–12	13–9
Kansas City	5–16–1	6–16	8–14	11–11	14–8	—	3–19	12–10
New York	13–9	14–8	14–8	13–9	12–10	19–3	—	13–9
Washington	7–15	8–14	5–17	7–15	9–13	10–12	9–13	—

=== Notable transactions ===
- April 29, 1957: Bob Chakales and Dean Stone were traded by the Senators to the Boston Red Sox for Faye Throneberry, Milt Bolling and Russ Kemmerer.
- June 17, 1957: Jim Kaat was signed as an amateur free agent by the Senators.

=== Roster ===
1957 Washington Senators
Roster
Pitchers: 15 Ted Abernathy; 26 Joe Black; 10,19 Dick Brodowski; 11 Bud Byerly; 16 Bob Chakales; 12,17 Tex Clevenger; 24 Hal Griggs; 34 Jim Heise; 34,42 Evelio Hernández; 35,45 Dick Hyde; 16 Russ Kemmerer; 30 Ralph Lumenti; 32 Don Minnick; 17,27 Camilo Pascual; 28 Pedro Ramos; 24,64 Garland Shifflett; 18 Chuck Stobbs; 26 Dean Stone; 21 Bob Wiesler	Catchers: 9 Lou Berberet; 14 Clint Courtney; 8 Ed Fitz Gerald; Infielders: 39,65 Julio Bécquer; 20 Milt Bolling; 31 Rocky Bridges; 3 Harmon Killebrew; 31,41 Lyle Luttrell; 25 Herb Plews; 5 Pete Runnels; 19 Art Schult; 6 Jerry Snyder; 1 Eddie Yost	Outfielders: 20,34 Neil Chrisley; 30 Whitey Herzog; 23 Jim Lemon; 3 Karl Olson; 19,29 Jerry Schoonmaker; 2 Roy Sievers; 4,32 Dick Tettelbach; 4 Faye Throneberry; 21 Bob Usher	Manager: 7 Chuck Dressen; 51 Cookie Lavagetto; Coaches: 55 Boom-Boom Beck; 53 Ellis Clary; 52 Joe Fitzgerald; 54 Billy Jurges; 51 Cookie Lavagetto

== Player stats ==
= Indicates team leader

= Indicates league leader

=== Batting ===
==== Starters by position ====
Note: Pos = Position; G = Games played; AB = At bats; H = Hits; Avg. = Batting average; HR = Home runs; RBI = Runs batted in

Pos	Player	G	AB	H	Avg.	HR	RBI
C	Lou Berberet	99	264	69	.261	7	36
1B	Pete Runnels	134	473	109	.230	2	35
2B	Herb Plews	104	329	89	.271	1	26
SS	Rocky Bridges	120	391	89	.228	3	47
3B	Eddie Yost	110	414	104	.251	9	38
LF	Roy Sievers	152	572	172	.301	42	114
CF	Bob Usher	96	295	77	.261	5	27
RF	Jim Lemon	137	518	147	.284	17	64

==== Other batters ====
Note: G = Games played; AB = At bats; H = Hits; Avg. = Batting average; HR = Home runs; RBI = Runs batted in

Player	G	AB	H	Avg.	HR	RBI
Milt Bolling	91	277	63	.227	4	19
Art Schult	77	247	65	.263	4	35
Clint Courtney	91	232	62	.267	6	27
Faye Throneberry	68	195	36	.185	2	12
Julio Bécquer	105	186	42	.226	2	22
Ed Fitz Gerald	45	125	34	.272	1	13
Jerry Snyder	42	93	14	.151	1	4
Whitey Herzog	36	78	13	.167	0	4
Neil Chrisley	26	51	8	.157	0	3
Lyle Luttrell	19	45	9	.200	0	5
Harmon Killebrew	9	31	9	.290	2	5
Jerry Schoonmaker	30	23	2	.087	0	0
Karl Olson	8	12	2	.167	0	0
Dick Tettelbach	9	11	2	.182	0	1

=== Pitching ===
==== Starting pitchers ====
Note: G = Games pitched; IP = Innings pitched; W = Wins; L = Losses; ERA = Earned run average; SO = Strikeouts

Player	G	IP	W	L	ERA	SO
Pedro Ramos	43	231.0	12	16	4.79	91
Chuck Stobbs	42	211.2	8	20	5.36	114
Camilo Pascual	29	175.2	8	17	4.10	113
Russ Kemmerer	39	172.1	7	11	4.96	81
Hal Griggs	2	13.2	0	1	3.29	12

==== Other pitchers ====
Note: G = Games pitched; IP = Innings pitched; W = Wins; L = Losses; ERA = Earned run average; SO = Strikeouts

Player	G	IP	W	L	ERA	SO
Tex Clevenger	52	139.2	7	6	4.19	75
Ted Abernathy	26	85.0	2	10	6.78	50
Jim Heise	8	19.0	0	3	8.05	8
Bob Chakales	4	18.1	0	1	5.40	12
Bob Wiesler	3	16.1	1	1	4.41	9
Ralph Lumenti	3	9.1	0	1	6.75	8
Don Minnick	2	9.1	0	1	4.82	7
Garland Shifflett	6	8.0	0	0	10.13	2

==== Relief pitchers ====
Note: G = Games pitched; W = Wins; L = Losses; SV = Saves; ERA = Earned run average; SO = Strikeouts

Player	G	W	L	SV	ERA	SO
Bud Byerly	47	6	6	6	3.13	39
Dick Hyde	52	4	3	1	4.12	46
Evelio Hernández	14	0	0	0	4.25	15
Joe Black	7	0	1	0	7.11	2
Dick Brodowski	6	0	1	0	11.12	4
Dean Stone	3	0	0	0	8.10	3

== Farm system ==
Level	Team	League	Manager
AA	Chattanooga Lookouts	Southern Association	Cal Ermer
A	Charlotte Hornets	Sally League	Gene Verble
B	Kinston Eagles/Wilson Tobs	Carolina League	Pete Suder
B	Midland/Lamesa Indians	Southwestern League	Johnny Welaj and Hank O'Neal
C	Missoula Timberjacks	Pioneer League	Jack McKeon
D	Fort Walton Beach Jets	Alabama–Florida League	Neal Cobb
D	Superior Senators	Nebraska State League	Ray Baker
D	Elmira Pioneers	New York–Penn League	Bill Brightwell

Kinston franchise transferred to Wilson and renamed, May 11, 1957; Midland franchise transferred to Lamesa, August 1, 1957
