= Al Aber =

American baseball player (1927–1993)

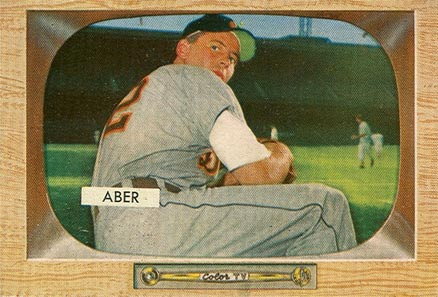
- Pitcher
- Born: July 31, 1927; Cleveland, Ohio, U.S.
- Died: May 20, 1993 (aged 65); Garfield Heights, Ohio, U.S.
- Batted: Left Threw: Left

MLB debut
- September 15, 1950, for the Cleveland Indians

Last MLB appearance
- September 11, 1957, for the Kansas City Athletics

MLB statistics
- Win–loss record: 24–25
- Earned run average: 4.18
- Strikeouts: 169
- Stats at Baseball Reference

Teams
- Cleveland Indians (1950, 1953); Detroit Tigers (1953–1957); Kansas City Athletics (1957)

Albert Julius Aber (July 31, 1927 – May 20, 1993) was an American professional baseball pitcher. He appeared in 168 games in Major League Baseball with the Cleveland Indians (1950, 1953), Detroit Tigers (1953–1957) and Kansas City Athletics (1957). Born in Cleveland, he threw and batted left-handed and was listed as 6 feet 2 inches (1.88 m) tall and 195 pounds (88 kg).

Aber graduated from West Technical High School and was signed as by the Indians at age 19 in 1946. He made his major league debut on September 15, 1950, pitching a complete-game victory, allowing two runs. He did not play another game in the big leagues until 1953, spending the 1951 and 1952 seasons performing military service during the Korean War. He appeared in six games for the Indians in 1953, winning one and losing one, before being traded on June 15 to the Tigers with Steve Gromek, Ray Boone and Dick Weik for Art Houtteman, Owen Friend, Bill Wight, and Joe Ginsberg. Aber spent the next five years with the Tigers, where he compiled a 22–24 record. His best statistical season was 1955, in which Aber appeared in 39 games and won six, lost three, and had an earned run average of 3.38. He was then waived by the Tigers, and was picked up by the Kansas City Athletics, for whom he pitched in three games, his final appearance coming on September 11, 1957.

In an interview in SPORT magazine in June 1956, Tigers catcher Frank House noted that Aber threw a "heavy" ball: "I could catch Billy (Hoeft) with a fielder's glove. Although he's fast, he throws a 'light' ball that makes it easy on the catcher. Al Aber, another leftie on our staff, is tough to catch because he throws a 'heavy' ball."

Aber became a sales representative after retiring. He died in 1993 at age 65 in Garfield Heights, Ohio.
