= Carl Powis =

American baseball player (1928–1999)

- Right fielder
- Born: January 11, 1928; Philadelphia, Pennsylvania, U.S.
- Died: May 10, 1999 (aged 71); Houston, Texas, U.S.
- Batted: Right Threw: Right

MLB debut
- April 15, 1957, for the Baltimore Orioles

Last MLB appearance
- May 5, 1957, for the Baltimore Orioles

MLB statistics
- Batting average: .195
- Home runs: 0
- Runs batted in: 2

Teams
- Baltimore Orioles (1957)

Carl Edgar Powis (January 11, 1928 – May 10, 1999) was an American professional baseball player.

Nicknamed "Jug," Powis played right field for the Baltimore Orioles of Major League Baseball during the first three weeks of the 1957 season. During fifteen games and thirteen starts, he had eight hits in forty-one at-bats, including three doubles and one triple, with two runs batted in.

== Biography ==
Born in Philadelphia, Pennsylvania on January 11, 1928, Powis batted and threw right-handed, stood 6 feet (1.8 m) tall and weighed 185 pounds (84 kg). He attended Murray State University and signed with the St. Louis Browns—the future Orioles' organization—in 1948. He spent nine years in the Browns/Orioles farm system before his 1957 trial season with Baltimore.

His pro career continued through 1959 in the minors, mostly at the Double-A level.

== Death ==
Powis died in Houston, Texas, at the age of 71.
