= Stan Pitula =

American baseball player (1931–1965)

- Pitcher
- Born: March 23, 1931; Hackensack, New Jersey, U.S.
- Died: August 15, 1965 (aged 34); Hackensack, New Jersey, U.S.
- Batted: Right Threw: Right

MLB debut
- April 24, 1957, for the Cleveland Indians

Last MLB appearance
- September 14, 1957, for the Cleveland Indians

MLB statistics
- Win–loss record: 2–2
- Earned run average: 4.98
- Innings pitched: 59 2/3
- Stats at Baseball Reference

Teams
- Cleveland Indians (1957)

Stanley Pitula Jr. (March 23, 1931 – August 15, 1965) was an American professional baseball player. A right-handed pitcher, he appeared in 23 Major League Baseball games for the Cleveland Indians during the 1957 season. Pitula stood 5 feet 10 inches (1.78 m) tall, weighed 170 pounds (77 kg), and batted right-handed.

Born in Hackensack, New Jersey, he signed his first pro contract with Cleveland after a standout career at Hackensack High School, which would later induct him into its Sports Hall of Fame. Pitula also was highly successful during the first five years of his professional career, going 81–43 (.653) in minor league baseball in leagues ranging from Class D to Triple-A. In 1957 he made the Indians' Major League roster, and pitched in 23 games, starting five. However, he injured his arm in an early-season game while facing Yogi Berra, and after pitching through pain for two months, he sustained a severe elbow injury while facing Roy Sievers of the Washington Senators on July 24, 1957. He never again pitched in the Major Leagues, making his last official appearance in MLB as a pinch runner late in 1957.

In his 23 MLB games and 59 2/3 innings pitched, Pitula allowed 67 hits (including eight home runs) and 32 bases on balls, with 17 strikeouts. He tossed one complete game, a 17–4 thrashing of the Boston Red Sox on July 14, 1957, at Cleveland Stadium. Pitula collected two hits in five at bats to help his cause, knocking in two runs.

Pitula returned to the minor leagues from 1958 to 1961 to try to regain his effectiveness, but he was unable to return to the Majors. After enduring personal difficulties, he died by suicide via carbon monoxide poisoning at the age of 34 in Hackensack.
