= Jack Crimian =

American baseball player (1926–2019)

- Pitcher
- Born: February 17, 1926; Philadelphia, Pennsylvania, U.S.
- Died: February 11, 2019 (aged 92); Claymont, Delaware, U.S.
- Batted: Right Threw: Right

MLB debut
- July 3, 1951, for the St. Louis Cardinals

Last MLB appearance
- May 6, 1957, for the Detroit Tigers

MLB statistics
- Win–loss record: 5–9
- Earned run average: 6.36
- Strikeouts: 69
- Stats at Baseball Reference

Teams
- St. Louis Cardinals (1951–1952); Kansas City Athletics (1956); Detroit Tigers (1957)

John Melvin Crimian (February 17, 1926 – February 11, 2019) was an American Major League Baseball pitcher. A right-hander, he appeared in 74 total games pitched for the St. Louis Cardinals (1951–52), Kansas City Athletics (1956) and Detroit Tigers (1957). The native of Philadelphia was listed at 5 feet 10 inches (1.78 m) tall and 180 pounds (82 kg).

== Biography ==
Crimian attended Olney High School in his native city and signed with his hometown Philadelphia Phillies in 1944. After wartime service in the United States Army in 1945, he returned to baseball in 1946, put up a 13–4 record with the Class B Wilmington Blue Rocks, and was drafted by the Cardinals out of the Phillies' organization that winter.

He spent another 41/2 years in minor league baseball before his call up to St. Louis in July 1951. In his first MLB trial, he got into seven games that month, all in relief, and was treated roughly, allowing 24 hits and eight bases on balls in 17 innings pitched. However, he registered his first big-league victory on July 15 by pitching 32/3 innings of three-hit, one-run relief to beat his original team, the Phillies, 7–4, in the first game of a doubleheader at Shibe Park. The Cardinals gave Crimian another audition in June 1952; manager Eddie Stanky used him out of the bullpen in five games and 81/3 innings. Crimian had a difficult outing on June 15, however, against the New York Giants, giving up seven hits and six earned runs in only one-third of an inning, and was returned to the Triple-A Rochester Red Wings for the remainder of 1952.

Crimian then recorded four consecutive seasons at the Triple-A level. Pitching mostly in relief, he notched earned run averages below 3.00 from 1952 to 1954, and won 30 out of 46 decisions in 174 games pitched. Then, in 1955, Crimian became a starting pitcher for the Toronto Maple Leafs, posting a 19–6 record and 2.10 earned average with 16 complete games, was named "Pitcher of the Year" in the International League, and then was acquired by the Athletics in October.

Crimian spent all of 1956 in the American League with Kansas City. Working in 54 games, seven as a starting pitcher, over 129 innings, he won four of 12 decisions and recorded three saves for a last-place team which lost 102 of 154 games. The Athletics then included him in an eight-player off-season trade to the Detroit Tigers, who used him in four games in April 1957 before being sent back to Toronto. During his MLB career, Crimian had 160 total innings pitched, allowing 177 hits, 65 bases on balls and recorded 69 strikeouts.

Crimian continued his minor league career into 1959, and won 15 of 23 decisions for the 1958 Maple Leafs. His minor league career saw him win 151 games, and lose 91.

In 1985, he was inducted into the Delaware Sports Hall of Fame.

Crimian died on February 11, 2019.
