= Jim Derrington =

American baseball player (1939–2020)

- Pitcher
- Born: November 29, 1939; Compton, California, U.S.
- Died: March 12, 2020 (aged 80); Pomona, California, U.S.
- Batted: Left Threw: Left

MLB debut
- September 30, 1956, for the Chicago White Sox

Last MLB appearance
- September 29, 1957, for the Chicago White Sox

MLB statistics
- Win–loss record: 0–2
- Earned run average: 5.23
- Innings pitched: 43
- Stats at Baseball Reference

Teams
- Chicago White Sox (1956–1957)

Career highlights and awards
- Youngest pitcher to start a game in American League history; Youngest player in American League history to record a base hit

Charles James Derrington (November 29, 1939 – March 12, 2020) was an American professional baseball player. A left-handed pitcher, he spent parts of the 1956 and 1957 seasons as a member of the Chicago White Sox. Derrington first appeared in semi-professional baseball at age 13 and was a high school star at age 16 as a hitter and a pitcher, winning a local player of the year award. Graduating at an early age, he signed with the White Sox for one of the largest bonuses of his time in 1956. Under the bonus rule of the time, he joined the White Sox immediately and went on to start their final game of the 1956 season, becoming the youngest pitcher to do so in the 20th century, and stayed with the team throughout the 1957 campaign. Sent back to the minor leagues in 1958, Derrington suffered an elbow injury which ultimately ended his professional career before age 22.

== Family and early life ==
Derrington was born on November 29, 1939, in Compton, California. His father, Charles, played Minor League Baseball in the Cleveland Indians organization. An uncle, Herman Reich, had a 17-year professional career which included one year in the major leagues.

When Derrington was 13, he pitched alongside his father in semi-pro baseball. Derrington entered high school early, a result of having skipped two grades during his elementary school years, but nevertheless had a successful amateur career. As a 16-year-old senior in 1956, he was named the Los Angeles City player of the year during a season where he recorded an earned run average (ERA) of 0.23 and also had a batting average of .452.

Derrington's success drew the attention of many scouts, as well as Commissioner of Baseball Ford Frick, who ruled that Derrington needed to pitch in American Legion Baseball before signing a professional contract. He spent the summer playing on a team at first base, as his father would not allow him to pitch. At season's end, Derrington was approached by White Sox owner Chuck Comiskey, at the recommendation of scout Hollis Thurston (Note: Hollis Thurston was a former major league pitcher who commonly went by the nickname Sloppy as a player and is listed as such on statistical websites such as Baseball-Reference.com.) and signed him on September 10. The team announced him as having received a $50,000 bonus, although, in reality, the real amount was much higher at $78,000, at that time being the second-largest, and ultimately the fourth-largest, bonus given during the years of the bonus rule in Major League Baseball.

== Major league career ==
Because of the size of his bonus, rules of the time required Derrington to stay on the major league roster for the next two calendar years. He was not used by the White Sox until the season finale on September 30, when he was given a start against the Kansas City Athletics. In the process, he became the youngest pitcher in major league history to start a game since the start of the 20th century at an age of 16 years and 306 days, a distinction he still holds, with only Willie McGill in 1890 starting a game a younger age in a recognized major league. (Note: McGill was 16 years and 179 days old when he debuted as a starting pitcher.) (Note: If the National Association counts as a major league, which is a debated topic among historians, Jim Britt started at an even younger age, doing so at 16 years and 67 days old in 1872.) Starting against George Brunet, Derrington allowed three runs in the first two innings, but kept the game tied through the next three. In the fourth inning, Derrington recorded his first career hit, a single off reliever Bill Harrington, becoming the youngest player in American League history to record a base hit, also a record he still owns. He was ultimately unable to score. In the sixth inning, he allowed three runs on a pair of home runs, a solo homer from Vic Power and a two-run shot to Lou Skizas. In the seventh inning, Larry Doby pinch hit for Derrington with the White Sox trailing 6–3. Despite a late rally, Chicago lost seven to six and Derrington took the loss in the game.

In a 1957 preview of the major league season, Derrington was described by Sports Illustrated as a "17-year-old whiz of a bonus pitcher". He had a successful spring training with the White Sox that year, but did not make his first appearance with the White Sox until June 1. Over the course of the season, Derrington appeared in 20 games, starting five of them, recording a 4.86 ERA. He was credited with one decision, a loss against the Detroit Tigers on September 25. In his two longest outings for the year, he was on pace for a victory only for the bullpen to cost him the win. Facing the Cleveland Indians on July 7, he pitched five innings of relief and only allowed one hit, and left the game with the White Sox leading eight to six, only for Paul LaPalme to allow the Indians to tie it with two runs in the ninth. Over a month later, on August 10, he was given a starting assignment against the Detroit Tigers where he pitched seven innings and allowed two runs, leaving with a three to two lead before Billy Pierce allowed four runs in the ninth.

Though he did not record a regular season victory, he did get credited with the win in the exhibition Hall of Fame Game that year.

== Minor league career ==
Before the 1958 season started, the bonus rule was rescinded, as was the requirement for such players affected by the rule to be kept on a major league roster. Derrington, who would have been required to stay on the roster for much of 1958 had the rule stayed in place, was subsequently sent to the Indianapolis Indians, Chicago's Triple-A club, of the American Association. Derrington spent four games with Indianapolis, then went down to Chicago's Single-A team, the Colorado Springs Sky Sox of the Western League, winning ten games but recording a high ERA of 7.06.

The 1959 season saw Derrington play with a new Single-A affiliate, the Charleston ChaSox of the South Atlantic League. (Note: The South Atlantic League became the Southern League in 1964. It is unrelated to the current South Atlantic League, which took on its name in 1980.) Again, he won 10 games; this time with an ERA of 3.68. He also made an appearance that year with the Triple-A Sacramento Solons.

Derrington went into spring training in 1960 with the Pacific Coast League's San Diego Padres. While pitching in a game that spring, he suffered a major injury, tearing all of the tendons and ligaments in his elbow. Derrington continued to play in the minors that year as a position player, most of which was spent back at Charleston. He began to throw off-speed pitches through weight training and, by 1961, he had returned to pitching. Sent to the Class B Lincoln Chiefs of the Illinois–Indiana–Iowa League, Derrington pitched with some success, going 7–5 with a 3.47 ERA. Moved up to the Double-A Mobile Bears of the Southern Association, he pitched less successfully, giving up 12 earned runs in 10 innings. At age 21, this was Derrington's final minor league season, as attempted to find a baseball-related job in 1962 failed.

== Later life ==
Derrington went on work at his father's appliance store upon retiring, then took over the business when his father died in 1968. He sold the business in 1979, then worked in produce for 10 years before seeking baseball-related work in 1989. In 1991, Derrington worked as a coach for Fullerton Union High School's baseball team and was their manager in the summer leagues. Later, he was the manager of the Pacific Suns of the independent Western Baseball League for the first half of the 1998 season.

Derrington died on March 12, 2020.
