= Harry Taylor (1957 pitcher) =

American baseball player (1935-2013)

- Pitcher
- Born: December 2, 1935; San Angelo, Texas, U.S.
- Died: January 24, 2013 (aged 77); Fort Worth, Texas, U.S.
- Batted: Right Threw: Right

MLB debut
- September 17, 1957, for the Kansas City Athletics

Last MLB appearance
- September 27, 1957, for the Kansas City Athletics

MLB statistics
- Win–loss record: 0–0
- Earned run average: 3.12
- Innings pitched: 8 2/3
- Stats at Baseball Reference

Teams
- Kansas City Athletics (1957)

Harry Evans Taylor (December 2, 1935 – January 24, 2013) was an American baseball player who played pitcher in the Major Leagues in 1957. He played for the Kansas City Athletics.
