= Earl Torgeson =

American baseball player (1924–1990)

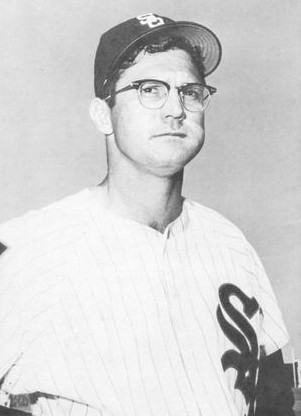
- First baseman
- Born: January 1, 1924; Snohomish, Washington, U.S.
- Died: November 8, 1990 (aged 66); Everett, Washington, U.S.
- Batted: Left Threw: Left

MLB debut
- April 15, 1947, for the Boston Braves

Last MLB appearance
- August 23, 1961, for the New York Yankees

MLB statistics
- Batting average: .265
- Home runs: 149
- Runs batted in: 740
- Stats at Baseball Reference

Teams
- Boston Braves (1947–1952); Philadelphia Phillies (1953–1955); Detroit Tigers (1955–1957); Chicago White Sox (1957–1961); New York Yankees (1961)

Career highlights and awards
- World Series champion (1961)

Clifford Earl Torgeson (January 1, 1924 – November 8, 1990) was an American Major League Baseball player from Snohomish, Washington. A first baseman, he played on five teams for 15 years, from 1947 through 1961. He was known by his middle name, Earl, and his nickname was "The Earl of Snohomish", a nickname originally owned by Baseball Hall of Famer, Earl Averill, also from Torgeson's hometown. In 1950, Torgeson led the National League (NL) with 120 runs scored and in 1957, he led the American League (AL) with a .999 fielding average as a first baseman.

== Early years and baseball ==
Torgeson was born in the lumber town of Snohomish, Washington on New Year's Day of 1924. He attended Snohomish High School and he served in the U.S. Army during World War II from 1943 to 1945. After the war, he played for Seattle in the Pacific Coast League.

== Major League baseball ==
Torgeson had a lifetime .265 batting average with 149 home runs, 740 RBI and a .989 fielding percentage. His best batting average for a full season was .290 and his highest home run total was 24. His career on-base percentage was .385 (the league average for the years he played is .339) and in 1950, when he led the National League with 120 runs scored, his on-base percentage was .412. Torgeson's peak years for drawing walks were 1950 and 1951, when he drew 119 and 102 respectively. In 1959, he helped the White Sox win the American League Pennant. In one game in 1959, during an inning against Kansas City where the White Sox scored 11 runs on one hit, he got a pinch-hit walk.

Torgeson was a regular player for nine years, and he would have been a regular in 1949 if not for a shoulder injury in May and broken thumb in August 1949 (also a broken rib when hit by a pitch in 1950). He played another five years as a role player. As a pinch hitter, as per earlier in his career, his patience at the plate was key to his value. In 1961, for example, playing out the string for the New York Yankees, he hit only .111 in 18 at-bats, but drew eight walks for a .385 on-base percentage.

In Torgeson's final season of 1961, he was sold by the White Sox to the New York Yankees. Torgeson managed only three total hits in 33 at-bats between the two teams, playing also exclusively as a pinch hitter. The Yankees converted Torgeson from a player to a coach on September 2; the Yankees went on to defeat the Cincinnati Reds in the World Series later that year. Torgeson did not appear in the World Series as a player, but was still part of the team as a coach.

Torgeson is also notable for his base stealing. Although his highest total for a baseball season was only 20, it came during a period in baseball when almost no one stole bases, especially not first basemen. For the short period (1950–1952) that they had Sam Jethroe (who won bases stealing crowns in 1950 and 1951) and Torgeson, the Braves had the best base stealing tandem in baseball. In 1950, with a combined total of 50 stolen bases, the Jethroe-Torgeson duo stole more bases than every other team in the National League, except for the Brooklyn Dodgers.

== Personal life and death ==
Torgeson returned to Snohomish County and served as a county commissioner and later the director of the county Department of Emergency Management. He died of leukemia at his home in Everett, Washington on November 8, 1990. He was 66 years old.

== See also ==
- List of Major League Baseball annual runs scored leaders
