= Jim Busby =

American baseball player (1927–1996)

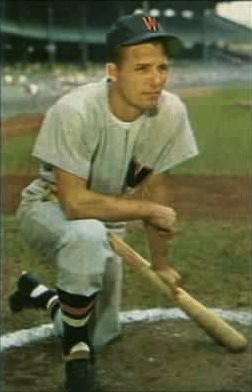
- Center fielder
- Born: January 8, 1927; Kenedy, Texas, U.S.
- Died: July 8, 1996 (aged 69); Augusta, Georgia, U.S.
- Batted: Right Threw: Right

MLB debut
- April 23, 1950, for the Chicago White Sox

Last MLB appearance
- July 8, 1962, for the Houston Colt .45s

MLB statistics
- Batting average: .262
- Home runs: 48
- Runs batted in: 438
- Stats at Baseball Reference

Teams
- Chicago White Sox (1950–1952); Washington Senators (1952–1955); Chicago White Sox (1955); Cleveland Indians (1956–1957); Baltimore Orioles (1957–1958); Boston Red Sox (1959–1960); Baltimore Orioles (1960–1961); Houston Colt .45s (1962)

Career highlights and awards
- All-Star (1951)

James Franklin Busby (January 8, 1927 – July 8, 1996) was an American center fielder and coach in Major League Baseball who played with the Chicago White Sox (1950–52, 1955), Washington Senators (1952–55), Cleveland Indians (1956–57), Baltimore Orioles (1957–58, 1960–61), Boston Red Sox (1959–60) and Houston Colt .45's (1962).

Busby was born in Kenedy, Texas, and attended Texas Christian University.

He threw and batted right-handed and was listed as 6 feet 1 inch (1.85 m) tall and 175 pounds (79 kg).

A cousin, Steve Busby, was a starting pitcher for the Kansas City Royals between 1972–80.

Jim Busby was signed by the White Sox in 1948 and made his major league debut early during the 1950 season. He became the regular center fielder for the White Sox in 1951. A fast runner and a good contact hitter, Busby compiled his best offensive seasons early in his career, exceeding the .280 batting mark in 1951, 1953 (when he hit a career-best .312) and 1954. He also drove in 80 or more RBI during both 1953—54. But he earned a reputation as a superb defensive outfielder who committed only 42 errors in 3,394 total chances (.988) over his lengthy career. He was an American League All-Star in 1951.

In all or parts of 13 MLB seasons, Busby batted .262, with 48 home runs, 438 runs batted in, 541 runs, 1,113 hits, 162 doubles, 35 triples, and 97 stolen bases in 1,352 games played. Defensively, he recorded a .988 fielding percentage as a center fielder.

When his career ended, in the middle of the 1962 season, he became a full-time coach with Houston (through 1967), then spent eight seasons (1968–75) on the staff of the Atlanta Braves, before returning to the American League to finish his coaching career with the White Sox (1976) and Seattle Mariners (1977–78).

As a player and coach, Busby had a 29-year MLB career.

He died in Augusta, Georgia, at 69 years of age.
