= Zeke Bella =

American baseball player (1930–2013)

- Outfielder
- Born: August 22, 1930; Greenwich, Connecticut, U.S.
- Died: November 17, 2013 (aged 83); Greenwich, Connecticut, U.S.
- Batted: Right Threw: Left

MLB debut
- September 11, 1957, for the New York Yankees

Last MLB appearance
- September 25, 1959, for the Kansas City Athletics

MLB statistics
- Batting average: .196
- Home runs: 1
- Runs batted in: 9
- Stats at Baseball Reference

Teams
- New York Yankees (1957); Kansas City Athletics (1959)

John "Zeke" Bella (August 22, 1930 – November 17, 2013) was an American Major League Baseball outfielder who appeared in 52 total games for the New York Yankees in 1957 and the Kansas City Athletics in 1959.

== Early life ==
Zeke Bella was born August 22, 1930, in Greenwich, Connecticut. Bella graduated from Greenwich High School in 1947 where he was called "[a] superlative athlete"; playing both football and baseball.

== MLB career ==
Bella began his professional career with the Class C Amsterdam Rugmakers, a Yankees' fram team, in 1951. He was among the relatively few position players who batted right-handed and threw left-handed, and was listed as 5 feet 11 inches (1.80 m) tall and 185 pounds (84 kg).

After two years' service in the United States Army during the Korean War, he spent 1954 and 1955 with the Class A Binghamton Triplets, then played from 1956 to 1958 with the Triple-A Denver Bears, the Yankees' top minor league affiliate.

Bella began his major league career on September 11, 1957, with the Yankees, playing in five games and garnering one hit in ten at bats during what would be his only appearances with the Bombers. After spending 1958 with the Bears, he was traded to Kansas City for veteran relief pitcher Murry Dickson on August 22. Bella then played in 47 games for Athletics in 1959. He hit his lone major-league home run on August 13, a two-run shot off Jack Harshman of the Cleveland Indians. He retired from baseball after the 1960 minor-league season.

Over his 52-game MLB career, Bella had 18 hits in 92 at-bats, with a .196 batting average.

== Awards and honors ==
Bella was inducted into the Greenwich High School Sports Hall of Fame in 2013.

== Death ==
Zeke Bella died on November 17, 2013, from complications due to a stroke, and the injuries received from a fall it induced; Bella was aged 83 years when he succumbed.
