= Kerby Farrell =

American baseball player and manager (1913–1975)

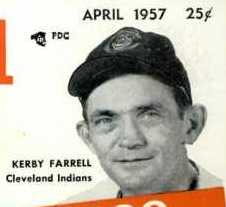
- First baseman / Manager
- Born: September 3, 1913; McNairy County, Tennessee, U.S.
- Died: December 17, 1975 (aged 62); Nashville, Tennessee, U.S.
- Batted: Left Threw: Left

MLB debut
- April 24, 1943, for the Boston Braves

Last MLB appearance
- September 23, 1945, for the Chicago White Sox

MLB statistics
- Batting average: .262
- Home runs: 0
- Runs batted in: 55
- Managerial record: 76–77
- Winning %: .497
- Stats at Baseball Reference

Teams
- As player: Boston Braves (1943); Chicago White Sox (1945); As coach: Chicago White Sox (1966–1969); Cleveland Indians (1970–1971); As manager: Cleveland Indians (1957)

Major Kerby Farrell (September 3, 1913 – December 17, 1975) was an American professional baseball player, coach and manager. He was a longtime minor league manager who spent a single season — 1957 — managing in Major League Baseball for the Cleveland Indians. Farrell was a three-time winner of The Sporting News' Minor League Manager of the Year award (1954, 1956 and 1961) and is the only man to have won that award more than twice (as of 2024).

== Playing career ==
Born in Leapwood, an unincorporated community of McNairy County, Tennessee, Farrell played college baseball at Freed-Hardeman College for two years. In his playing days (1932–52), he was a first baseman and veteran minor-leaguer who appeared in two full MLB seasons during the World War II manpower shortage, with the 1943 Boston Braves and the 1945 Chicago White Sox, batting .262 with 177 hits, no home runs and 55 runs batted in in 188 games played. He also pitched in five games for the 1943 Braves, losing his only decision and compiling an earned run average of 4.30 in 23 innings of work. He batted and threw left-handed, stood 5 feet 11 inches (1.80 m) tall and weighed 172 pounds (78 kg).

== Managing career ==
Farrell began his managing career before the war in the Class C Middle Atlantic League in 1941–42. In 1947, he joined the farm system of the Cleveland Indians as skipper of the Spartanburg Peaches of the Class B Tri-State League and began a steady rise through the Cleveland organization. His 1953 Reading Indians of the Class A Eastern League won 101 games, while his 1954 and 1956 Indianapolis Indians, then Cleveland's Triple-A club, won American Association pennants and the 1956 Junior World Series. These triumphs earned Farrell his first two managerial awards.

At the close of the 1956 season, after his club had won 88 games and finished as runners-up to the New York Yankees, Cleveland Indians manager Al López resigned to become the new skipper of the White Sox and Farrell was promoted to succeed him. The 1957 campaign was a star-crossed season for the Indians. Prodigal left-handed pitcher Herb Score, a strikeout king and 20-game winner in 1956, was nearly blinded on May 7 by a line drive off the bat of the Yankees' Gil McDougald, and missed the rest of the campaign. Two other 20-game winners from '56, eventual Hall of Famers Bob Lemon and Early Wynn, slumped to below .500 records. The Indians fell to a 76–77 (.497) record and a sixth-place finish, the team changed general managers (from Hank Greenberg to Frank Lane), and Farrell was fired.

He then returned to the minors, where he managed in the Philadelphia Phillies, New York Mets and Minnesota Twins organizations. He also coached for the White Sox (1966–69) and Indians (1970–71). As a minor league skipper over 21 seasons, Farrell won 1,710 games, losing 1,456 (.540).

== Death ==
Kerby Farrell died from a heart attack in Nashville, Tennessee, at age 62.

Preceded by Birdie Tebbetts	Indianapolis Indians manager 1954–1956	Succeeded by Andy Cohen
Preceded by Don Osborn	Miami Marlins (IL) manager 1958	Succeeded by Pepper Martin
Preceded by Phil Cavarretta; Sheriff Robinson	Buffalo Bisons manager 1959–1963; 1965	Succeeded by Whitey Kurowski; Red Davis
Preceded by Harry Warner	Tacoma Twins manager 1973	Succeeded by Cal Ermer
