= Don Rudolph =

American baseball player (1931–1968)

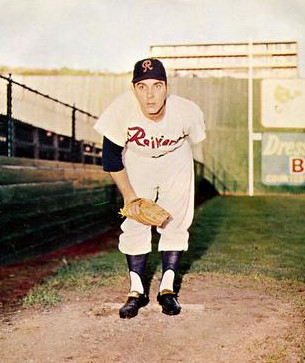
- Rudolph with the Seattle Rainiers (PCL)
- Pitcher
- Born: August 16, 1931; Baltimore, Maryland, U.S.
- Died: September 12, 1968 (aged 37); Granada Hills, California, U.S.
- Batted: Left Threw: Left

MLB debut
- September 21, 1957, for the Chicago White Sox

Last MLB appearance
- October 3, 1964, for the Washington Senators

MLB statistics
- Win–loss record: 18–32
- Earned run average: 4.00
- Strikeouts: 182
- Stats at Baseball Reference

Teams
- Chicago White Sox (1957–1959); Cincinnati Reds (1959); Cleveland Indians (1962); Washington Senators (1962–1964)

Frederick Donald Rudolph (August 16, 1931 – September 12, 1968) was an American Major League Baseball (MLB) left-handed pitcher. He appeared in 124 games pitched over all or parts of six major league seasons for the Chicago White Sox, Cincinnati Reds, Cleveland Indians and Washington Senators between 1957 and 1964. The native of Baltimore was listed as 5 feet 11 inches (1.80 m) tall and 195 pounds (88 kg).

Rudolph's professional baseball career extended from 1950 through 1966, except for the 1953 season, which he spent in the United States Army. Of his 124 MLB appearances, 57 were starts. He compiled an 18–32 record (.360), with ten complete games and two shutouts. The two whitewashings came in back-to-back starts for Washington during 1962; he defeated the Minnesota Twins and Baltimore Orioles on August 23 and 28, respectively. In 4501/3 MLB innings pitched, he allowed 485 hits and 102 bases on balls, striking out 182 hitters. His career ERA was 4.00. He was credited with three saves.

Known during his career as the husband and manager of burlesque dancer "Patti Waggin" (born Patricia Brownell), Rudolph was a batting practice pitcher for the American League (AL) All-Star team on July 10, 1962 at District of Columbia Stadium (Robert F. Kennedy Stadium). In 1963, he pitched in 37 games for Washington and led the AL in fielding percentage as a pitcher with a 1.000 fielding average. He also was the starting pitcher for Washington's traditional "Presidential Opener" on April 8 that season. After John F. Kennedy threw out the ceremonial first pitch, Rudolph went five innings against the Baltimore Orioles, allowing home runs to left-handed hitters Jim Gentile and Boog Powell and taking the 3–1 loss.

Rudolph owned a construction business when he was killed in a truck accident at age 37.
