= Joe Ginsberg =

American baseball player (1926–2012)

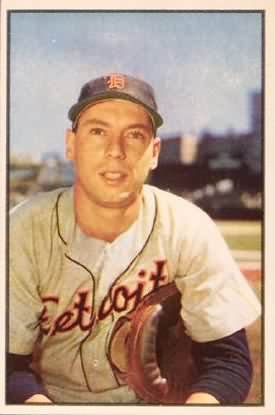
- Catcher
- Born: October 11, 1926; New York, New York, U.S.
- Died: November 2, 2012 (aged 86); West Bloomfield, Michigan, U.S.
- Batted: Left Threw: Right

MLB debut
- September 15, 1948, for the Detroit Tigers

Last MLB appearance
- April 15, 1962, for the New York Mets

MLB statistics
- Batting average: .241
- Home runs: 20
- Runs batted in: 182
- Stats at Baseball Reference

Teams
- Detroit Tigers (1948, 1950–1953); Cleveland Indians (1953–1954); Kansas City Athletics (1956); Baltimore Orioles (1956–1960); Chicago White Sox (1960–1961); Boston Red Sox (1961); New York Mets (1962)

Myron Nathan "Joe" Ginsberg (October 11, 1926 – November 2, 2012) was an American professional baseball player. A catcher, he played for seven Major League Baseball teams: the Detroit Tigers (1948 and 1950–53), Cleveland Indians (1953–54), Kansas City Athletics (1956), Baltimore Orioles (1956–60), Chicago White Sox (1960–61), Boston Red Sox (1961) and New York Mets (1962).

== Early life ==
Ginsberg was Jewish. He was born in Manhattan, and attended Cooley High School in Detroit, Michigan.

== Baseball career ==
Ginsberg batted left-handed, threw right-handed, and was listed as 5 feet 11 inches (1.80 m) tall and 180 pounds (82 kg). In his 13 MLB seasons he played in 695 games (520 of them for the Tigers and Orioles), and had 1,716 at bats, 168 runs, 414 hits, 59 doubles, eight triples, 20 home runs, 182 RBIs, seven stolen bases, 226 walks, a .241 batting average, .332 on-base percentage, 17 sacrifice hits, 13 sacrifice flies and nine intentional walks.

As a Tiger, Ginsberg caught the first of Virgil Trucks' two no-hitters on the 1952 season, on May 15.

== Death ==
Ginsberg died on November 2, 2012, in West Bloomfield, Michigan, at the age of 86.
