= 1957 Major League Baseball season =

1957 MLB season
- League: American League (AL); National League (NL)
- Sport: Baseball
- Duration: Regular season: April 15 – September 29, 1957 (AL); April 16 – September 29, 1957 (NL); World Series: October 2–10, 1957
- Games: 154
- Teams: 16 (8 per league)
- TV partner(s): NBC, CBS

Regular season
- Season MVP: AL: Mickey Mantle (NYY); NL: Hank Aaron (MIL)
- AL champions: New York Yankees
- AL runners-up: Chicago White Sox
- NL champions: Milwaukee Braves
- NL runners-up: St. Louis Cardinals

World Series
- Champions: Milwaukee Braves
- Runners-up: New York Yankees
- World Series MVP: Lew Burdette (MIL)

MLB seasons
- ← 1956 1958 →

Locations of teams for the 1955–1960 American League seasons
American League
Locations of teams for the 1953–1957 National League seasons
National League

The 1957 major league baseball season began on April 15, 1957. The regular season ended on September 29, with the Milwaukee Braves and New York Yankees as the regular season champions of the National League and American League, respectively. The postseason began with Game 1 of the 54th World Series on October 2 and ended with Game 7 on October 10. The Braves defeated the Yankees, four games to three, capturing their second championship in franchise history, their first since 1914, and first in Milwaukee. Going into the season, the defending World Series champions were the New York Yankees from the 1956 season.

The 24th All-Star Game was held on July 9 at Busch Stadium in St. Louis, Missouri, home of the St. Louis Cardinals. The American League won, 6–5.

The National League's Brooklyn Dodgers and New York Giants played their final seasons as New York City-based franchises before their moves to California for the 1958 season, leaving New York City without a National League team until the founding of the expansion New York Mets in 1962.

On April 22, the Philadelphia Phillies became the 14th team in professional baseball to break the color line when they fielded John Kennedy.

== Schedule ==
The 1957 schedule consisted of 154 games for all teams in the American League and National League, each of which had eight teams. Each team was scheduled to play 22 games against the other seven teams of their respective league. This continued the format put in place since the 1904 season (except for 1919) and would be used until 1961 in the American League and 1962 in the National League.

American League Opening Day took place on April 15, featuring the Baltimore Orioles and Washington Senators, while National League Opening Day took place the following day, featuring all eight NL teams. This was the first season since 1953 that both leagues opened on different days. The final day of the regular season was on September 29, which saw all sixteen teams play, continuing the trend from 1955. The World Series took place between October 2 and October 10.

=== Proposed interleague play ===
During the Winter Meetings in Chicago on December 6–8, 1956, Cleveland general manager and minority-owner Hank Greenberg proposed implementing limited interleague play beginning in 1958. Under Greenberg's proposal, each team would continue to play 154-games in a season, 126 of which would be within their league, and 28 against the eight clubs in the other league. The interleague games would all be played during a period immediately following the All-Star Game. The proposal was not adopted.

== Rule changes ==
The 1957 season saw the following rule changes:

- The American League changed its rules involving a first-place tie at the end of the season. Matching the system already in place by the National League, there would be a best-of-three series to determine the winner of the pennant. This was to be considered an extension to the regular season. Previously, there would be a one-game extension to the regular season to decide who won the pennant.
- If a postponed game (after a team's final visit to the opposing city) was necessary to play to determine the pennant winner, the final game(s) were to be played in the opposing city (if possible).
- The 30-player roster which was permitted from Opening Day until June 15 was cut to 28-players.
- The 1955 rule restricting teams from signing a college player, who at a minimum started sophomore year, was under 21, and whose class hadn't yet graduated, was lifted. Now, any college player could be signed.
- If an infield fly rule was declared, and the ball bounced foul and was untouched, it was a foul ball.
- Regarding end-of-game situations where the runner on third refuses to come home in a timely manner, the umpire can call said runner out, and the same goes for the batter-runner getting to first base. In the case of the batter-runner, if there are less than two outs and a run scores, that run will count. If there are two outs, a run home will not count.
- Any pitcher using a foreign substance on a ball will result in a 10-day suspension. Previously, the league president would impose fines and the suspension to his discretion.
- Originally introduced in 1955, the rule that when a bases on balls occurs due to a wild pitch, where baserunners took at least one additional base than what was already guaranteed by a bases on balls, was changed. Now, instead of the pitcher an error, the pitcher is charged with a wild pitch.

== Teams ==
An asterisk (*) denotes the ballpark a team played the minority of their home games at

League	Team	City	Ballpark	Capacity	Manager
American League	Baltimore Orioles	Baltimore, Maryland	Baltimore Memorial Stadium	47,778	Paul Richards
American League	Boston Red Sox	Boston, Massachusetts	Fenway Park	34,824	Pinky Higgins
American League	Chicago White Sox	Chicago, Illinois	Comiskey Park	46,550	Marty Marion
American League	Cleveland Indians	Cleveland, Ohio	Cleveland Stadium	73,811	Kerby Farrell
American League	Detroit Tigers	Detroit, Michigan	Briggs Stadium	58,000	Jack Tighe
American League	Kansas City Athletics	Kansas City, Missouri	Municipal Stadium	30,296	Lou Boudreau
American League	Kansas City Athletics	Kansas City, Missouri	Municipal Stadium	30,296	Harry Craft
American League	New York Yankees	New York, New York	Yankee Stadium	67,000	Casey Stengel
American League	Washington Senators	Washington, D.C.	Griffith Stadium	29,023	Chuck Dressen
American League	Washington Senators	Washington, D.C.	Griffith Stadium	29,023	Cookie Lavagetto
National League	Brooklyn Dodgers	New York, New York	Ebbets Field	31,902	Walter Alston
National League	Brooklyn Dodgers	Jersey City, New Jersey	Roosevelt Stadium*	24,167*	Walter Alston
National League	Chicago Cubs	Chicago, Illinois	Wrigley Field	36,755	Bob Scheffing
National League	Cincinnati Redlegs	Cincinnati, Ohio	Crosley Field	29,584	Birdie Tebbetts
National League	Milwaukee Braves	Milwaukee, Wisconsin	Milwaukee County Stadium	43,768	Fred Haney
National League	New York Giants	New York, New York	Polo Grounds	54,500	Bill Rigney
National League	Philadelphia Phillies	Philadelphia, Pennsylvania	Connie Mack Stadium	33,359	Mayo Smith
National League	Pittsburgh Pirates	Pittsburgh, Pennsylvania	Forbes Field	34,249	Bobby Bragan
National League	Pittsburgh Pirates	Pittsburgh, Pennsylvania	Forbes Field	34,249	Danny Murtaugh
National League	St. Louis Cardinals	St. Louis, Missouri	Busch Stadium	30,500	Fred Hutchinson

== Standings ==
=== American League ===
American League
Team	W	L	Pct.	GB	Home	Road
New York Yankees	98	56	.636	—	48‍–‍29	50‍–‍27
Chicago White Sox	90	64	.584	8	45‍–‍32	45‍–‍32
Boston Red Sox	82	72	.532	16	44‍–‍33	38‍–‍39
Detroit Tigers	78	76	.506	20	45‍–‍32	33‍–‍44
Baltimore Orioles	76	76	.500	21	42‍–‍33	34‍–‍43
Cleveland Indians	76	77	.497	21½	40‍–‍37	36‍–‍40
Kansas City Athletics	59	94	.386	38½	37‍–‍40	22‍–‍54
Washington Senators	55	99	.357	43	28‍–‍49	27‍–‍50

=== National League ===
National League
Team	W	L	Pct.	GB	Home	Road
Milwaukee Braves	95	59	.617	—	45‍–‍32	50‍–‍27
St. Louis Cardinals	87	67	.565	8	42‍–‍35	45‍–‍32
Brooklyn Dodgers	84	70	.545	11	43‍–‍34	41‍–‍36
Cincinnati Redlegs	80	74	.519	15	45‍–‍32	35‍–‍42
Philadelphia Phillies	77	77	.500	18	38‍–‍39	39‍–‍38
New York Giants	69	85	.448	26	37‍–‍40	32‍–‍45
Pittsburgh Pirates	62	92	.403	33	36‍–‍41	26‍–‍51
Chicago Cubs	62	92	.403	33	31‍–‍46	31‍–‍46

=== Tie games ===
5 tie games (2 in AL, 3 in NL), which are not factored into winning percentage or games behind (and were often replayed again) occurred throughout the season.

==== American League ====
The Baltimore Orioles had two tie games. The Chicago White Sox and Kansas City Athletics had one each.

- May 18, Chicago White Sox vs. Baltimore Orioles, tied at 4 after a leadoff home run in the bottom of the ninth inning due to a pre-agreed 10:20 p.m. curfew to allow the White Sox to catch a train for Boston.
- May 19 (game 2), Kansas City Athletics vs. Baltimore Orioles, scoreless tie in the middle of the 6th inning due to rain.

==== National League ====
The Chicago Cubs and Philadelphia Phillies had two tie games each. The Milwaukee Braves and Pittsburgh Pirates had one each.

- May 21, Philadelphia Phillies vs. Milwaukee Braves, tied at 1 after a shortened five innings following a five minute rain delay, resumption of the game to finish the top of the sixth inning, and a 31 minute rain delay which negated the sixth inning entirely.
- June 9 (game 2), Chicago Cubs vs. Philadelphia Phillies, tied at 4 after nine innings due to curfew. A partial top of the 10th inning was negated.
- June 26 (game 2), Pittsburgh Pirates vs. Chicago Cubs, tied at 5 after 11 innings on account of darkness.

== Postseason ==
The postseason began on October 2 and ended on October 10 with the Milwaukee Braves defeating the New York Yankees in the 1957 World Series in seven games.

=== Bracket ===
World Series
AL	New York Yankees	3
NL	Milwaukee Braves	4

== Managerial changes ==
=== Off-season ===
Team	Former Manager	New Manager
Chicago Cubs	Stan Hack	Bob Scheffing
Cleveland Indians	Al López	Kerby Farrell
Detroit Tigers	Bucky Harris	Jack Tighe

=== In-season ===
Team	Former Manager	New Manager
Kansas City Athletics	Lou Boudreau	Harry Craft
Pittsburgh Pirates	Bobby Bragan	Danny Murtaugh
Washington Senators	Chuck Dressen	Cookie Lavagetto

== League leaders ==
Any team shown in small text indicates a previous team a player was on during the season.

=== American League ===
Hitting leaders
Stat	Player	Total
AVG	Ted Williams (BOS)	.388
OPS	Ted Williams (BOS)	1.257
HR	Roy Sievers (WSH)	42
RBI	Roy Sievers (WSH)	114
R	Mickey Mantle (NYY)	121
H	Nellie Fox (CWS)	196
SB	Luis Aparicio (CWS)	28

Pitching leaders
Stat	Player	Total
W	Jim Bunning (DET); Billy Pierce (CWS)	20
L	Chuck Stobbs (WSH)	20
ERA	Bobby Shantz (NYY)	2.45
K	Early Wynn (CLE)	184
IP	Jim Bunning (DET)	267.1
SV	Bob Grim (NYY)	19
WHIP	Frank Sullivan (BOS)	1.055

=== National League ===
Hitting leaders
Stat	Player	Total
AVG	Stan Musial (STL)	.351
OPS	Stan Musial (STL)	1.034
HR	Hank Aaron (MIL)	44
RBI	Hank Aaron (MIL)	132
R	Hank Aaron (MIL)	118
H	Red Schoendienst (MIL/NYG)	200
SB	Willie Mays (NYG)	38

Pitching leaders
Stat	Player	Total
W	Warren Spahn (MIL)	21
L	Robin Roberts (PHI)	22
ERA	Johnny Podres (BRO)	2.66
K	Jack Sanford (PHI)	188
IP	Bob Friend (PIT)	277.0
SV	Clem Labine (BRO)	17
WHIP	Johnny Podres (BRO)	1.082

== Milestones ==
=== Batters ===
==== Cycles ====
- Lee Walls (CHC/PIT):
  - Walls hit for his first cycle and sixth in franchise history as a part of the Chicago Cubs, on July 2 against the Cincinnati Redlegs.
- Mickey Mantle (NYY):
  - Mantle hit for his first cycle and 12th in franchise history, on July 23 against the Chicago White Sox.

==== Other batting accomplishments ====
- Roy Sievers (WSH):
  - Tied an American League record by becoming the third player to hit home runs in six consecutive games between July 29 and August 3.

=== Pitchers ===
==== No-hitters ====
- Bob Keegan (CWS):
  - Keegan threw his first career no-hitter and 11th no-hitter in franchise history, by defeating the Washington Senators 6–0 in game two of a doubleheader on August 20. Trucks walked two and struck out one.

=== Miscellaneous ===
- The 1957 season marked the first time that both the American and National League leader in Complete Games had less than 20 Complete Games to lead their league.

== Awards and honors ==
=== Regular season ===
Baseball Writers' Association of America Awards
BBWAA Award	National League	American League
Rookie of the Year	Jack Sanford (PHI)	Tony Kubek (NYY)
Cy Young Award	Warren Spahn (MIL)	—
Most Valuable Player	Hank Aaron (MIL)	Mickey Mantle (NYY)
Babe Ruth Award (World Series MVP)	Lew Burdette (MIL)	—
Gold Glove Awards (Note: In 1957, Gold Gloves were given to the top fielders across Major League Baseball, instead of separate awards for each league.)
Position	National League	American League
Pitcher	—	Bobby Shantz (NYY)
Catcher	—	Sherm Lollar (CWS)
1st Base	Gil Hodges (BRO)	—
2nd Base	—	Nellie Fox (CWS)
3rd Base	—	Frank Malzone (BOS)
Shortstop	Roy McMillan (CIN)	—
Left field	—	Minnie Miñoso (CWS)
Center field	Willie Mays (NYG)	—
Right field	—	Al Kaline (DET)

=== Other awards ===
- Sport Magazine's World Series Most Valuable Player Award: Lew Burdette (MIL)

The Sporting News Awards
Award	National League	American League
Player of the Year	—	Ted Williams (BOS)
Pitcher of the Year	Warren Spahn (MIL)	Billy Pierce (CWS
Rookie of the Year (Player)	Ed Bouchee (PHI)	Tony Kubek (NYY)
Rookie of the Year (Pitcher)	Jack Sanford (PHI)	—
Manager of the Year	Fred Hutchinson (STL)	—
Executive of the Year	Frank Lane (STL)	—

=== Baseball Hall of Fame ===
- Sam Crawford
- Joe McCarthy (manager)

== Home field attendance ==
Team name	Wins	%±	Home attendance	%±	Per game
Milwaukee Braves	95	3.3%	2,215,404	8.3%	28,403
New York Yankees	98	1.0%	1,497,134	0.4%	19,443
Detroit Tigers	78	−4.9%	1,272,346	21.0%	16,524
St. Louis Cardinals	87	14.5%	1,183,575	14.9%	15,371
Boston Red Sox	82	−2.4%	1,181,087	3.9%	15,339
Philadelphia Phillies	77	8.5%	1,146,230	22.6%	14,695
Chicago White Sox	90	5.9%	1,135,668	13.6%	14,749
Cincinnati Redlegs	80	−12.1%	1,070,850	−4.9%	13,907
Baltimore Orioles	76	10.1%	1,029,581	14.2%	13,371
Brooklyn Dodgers	84	−9.7%	1,028,258	−15.3%	13,354
Kansas City Athletics	59	13.5%	901,067	−11.2%	11,702
Pittsburgh Pirates	62	−6.1%	850,732	−10.4%	11,048
Cleveland Indians	76	−13.6%	722,256	−16.5%	9,380
Chicago Cubs	62	3.3%	670,629	−6.9%	8,598
New York Giants	69	3.0%	653,923	3.9%	8,493
Washington Senators	55	−6.8%	457,079	5.9%	5,936

== Venues ==
The Brooklyn Dodgers would continue to play several home games in Jersey City, New Jersey as they started doing so the previous year, playing eight games, on April 22, May 3, June 5, 10, July 12, August 7, 16, and September 3.

The Brooklyn Dodgers would play their final game at Ebbets Field on September 24 against the Pittsburgh Pirates, relocating to Los Angeles, California at Los Angeles Memorial Coliseum as the Los Angeles Dodgers for the start of the 1958 season.

The New York Giants would play their final game at the Polo Grounds on September 29 against the Pittsburgh Pirates, relocating to San Francisco, California at Seals Stadium as the San Francisco Giants for the start of the 1958 season.

== Media ==
=== Television ===
CBS aired the Game of the Week for the third consecutive year, and began to air games on Sunday as well as Saturday.

NBC also started to air weekend games, purchasing the rights to broadcast 11 Milwaukee Braves games, 11 Pittsburgh Pirates games, two Washington Senators games, and two Chicago Cubs games. The All-Star Game and World Series also aired on NBC.

== See also ==
- 1957 in baseball (Events, Movies, Births, Deaths)
- 1957 Nippon Professional Baseball season
