= 1955 Chicago White Sox season =

1955 Chicago White Sox
- League: American League
- Ballpark: Comiskey Park
- City: Chicago
- Record: 91–63 (.591)
- League place: 3rd
- Owners: Grace Comiskey
- General managers: Frank Lane
- Managers: Marty Marion
- Television: WGN-TV (Jack Brickhouse, Harry Creighton)
- Radio: WCFL (Bob Elson, Don Wells)

The 1955 Chicago White Sox season was the team's 55th season in the major leagues, and its 56th season overall. The White Sox started the season with a plus 40 run-differential in their first eight games, good for second best in the modern era. They finished with a record of 91–63, good enough for third place in the American League, five games behind the first place New York Yankees.

== Offseason ==
- December 6, 1954: Leo Cristante, Ferris Fain, and Jack Phillips were traded by the White Sox to the Detroit Tigers for Walt Dropo, Ted Gray and Bob Nieman.
- December 6, 1954: Don Ferrarese, Don Johnson, Matt Batts, and Fred Marsh were traded by the White Sox to the Baltimore Orioles for Bob Chakales, Jim Brideweser and Clint Courtney.
- February 10, 1955: Lloyd Merriman was purchased by the White Sox from the Cincinnati Redlegs.
- Prior to 1955 season (exact date unknown)
  - Vito Valentinetti was acquired from the White Sox by the Charleston Senators.
  - Jim McAnany was signed as an amateur free agent by the White Sox.

== Regular season ==
=== Season standings ===
American League
Team	W	L	Pct.	GB	Home	Road
New York Yankees	96	58	.623	—	52‍–‍25	44‍–‍33
Cleveland Indians	93	61	.604	3	49‍–‍28	44‍–‍33
Chicago White Sox	91	63	.591	5	49‍–‍28	42‍–‍35
Boston Red Sox	84	70	.545	12	47‍–‍31	37‍–‍39
Detroit Tigers	79	75	.513	17	46‍–‍31	33‍–‍44
Kansas City Athletics	63	91	.409	33	33‍–‍43	30‍–‍48
Baltimore Orioles	57	97	.370	39	30‍–‍47	27‍–‍50
Washington Senators	53	101	.344	43	28‍–‍49	25‍–‍52

=== Record vs. opponents ===
1955 American League record Sources:
Team	BAL	BOS	CWS	CLE	DET	KCA	NYY	WSH
Baltimore	—	8–14	10–12–1	3–19	9–13	10–12–1	3–19	14–8
Boston	14–8	—	9–13	11–11	13–9	14–8	8–14	15–7
Chicago	12–10–1	13–9	—	10–12	14–8	14–8	11–11	17–5
Cleveland	19–3	11–11	12–10	—	12–10	17–5	13–9	9–13
Detroit	13–9	9–13	8–14	10–12	—	12–10	10–12	17–5
Kansas City	12–10–1	8–14	8–14	5–17	10–12	—	7–15	13–9
New York	19–3	14–8	11–11	9–13	12–10	15–7	—	16–6
Washington	8–14	7–15	5–17	13–9	5–17	9–13	6–16	—

=== Opening Day lineup ===
- Chico Carrasquel, SS
- Nellie Fox, 2B
- Minnie Miñoso, LF
- George Kell, 3B
- Jim Rivera, CF
- Walt Dropo, 1B
- Willard Marshall, RF
- Sherm Lollar, C
- Virgil Trucks, P

=== Notable transactions ===
- April 16, 1955: Lloyd Merriman was purchased by the Chicago Cubs from the Chicago White Sox.
- June 7, 1955: Bob Chakales, Clint Courtney and Johnny Groth were traded by the White Sox to the Washington Senators for Jim Busby.

=== Roster ===
1955 Chicago White Sox
Roster
Pitchers: 32 Harry Byrd; 28 Bob Chakales; 20 Sandy Consuegra; 22,31 Dick Donovan; 12 Harry Dorish; 16 Mike Fornieles; 25 Ted Gray; 29 Jack Harshman; 28 Dixie Howell; 44 Connie Johnson; 15 Bob Keegan; 36 Morrie Martin; 24 Al Papai; 19 Billy Pierce; 23 Virgil Trucks	Catchers: 35,26 Earl Battey; 11 Clint Courtney; 10 Sherm Lollar; 12 Les Moss; Infielders: 25 Bobby Adams; 3 Jim Brideweser; 17 Chico Carrasquel; 44 Phil Cavarretta; 8 Walt Dropo; 16 Sammy Esposito; 2 Nellie Fox; 42 Ron Jackson; 21,31 Stan Jok; 1 George Kell; 30 Bob Kennedy; 11 Buddy Peterson; 35 Vern Stephens	Outfielders: 5 Jim Busby; 35 Gil Coan; 5 Johnny Groth; 27 Willard Marshall; 6,35 Ed McGhee; 9 Minnie Miñoso; 18 Bob Nieman; 6 Ron Northey; 7 Jim Rivera; 27 Ed White; Other batters: 30 Lloyd Merriman; 21 Bob Powell	Manager: 4 Marty Marion; Coaches: 37 Ray Berres; 39 Don Gutteridge; 34 George Myatt; 33 Del Wilber

== Player stats ==
=== Batting ===
Note: G = Games played; AB = At bats; R = Runs scored; H = Hits; 2B = Doubles; 3B = Triples; HR = Home runs; RBI = Runs batted in; BB = Base on balls; SO = Strikeouts; AVG = Batting average; SB = Stolen bases

Player	G	AB	R	H	2B	3B	HR	RBI	BB	SO	AVG	SB
Bobby Adams, 3B	28	21	8	2	0	1	0	3	4	4	.095	0
Earl Battey, C	5	7	1	2	0	0	0	0	1	1	.286	0
Jim Brideweser, SS	34	58	6	12	3	2	0	4	3	7	.207	0
Jim Busby, CF	99	337	38	82	13	4	1	27	25	37	.243	7
Chico Carrasquel, SS	145	523	83	134	11	2	11	52	61	59	.256	1
Phil Cavarretta, 1B	6	4	1	0	0	0	0	0	0	1	.000	0
Gil Coan, RF	17	17	0	3	0	0	0	1	0	5	.176	0
Clint Courtney, C	19	37	7	14	3	0	1	10	7	0	.378	0
Walt Dropo, 1B	141	453	55	127	15	2	19	79	42	71	.280	0
Sammy Esposito, 3B	3	4	3	0	0	0	0	0	1	0	.000	0
Nellie Fox, 2B	154	636	100	198	28	7	6	59	38	15	.311	7
Johnny Groth, CF	32	77	13	26	7	0	2	11	6	13	.338	1
Ron Jackson, 1B	40	74	10	15	1	1	2	7	8	22	.203	1
Stan Jok, 3B	6	4	3	1	0	0	1	2	1	1	.250	0
George Kell, 3B, 1B	128	429	44	134	24	1	8	81	51	36	.312	2
Bob Kennedy, 3B, RF	83	214	28	65	10	2	9	43	16	16	.304	0
Sherm Lollar, C	138	426	67	111	13	1	16	61	68	34	.261	2
Willard Marshall, RF, LF	22	41	6	7	0	0	0	6	13	1	.171	0
Ed McGhee, CF, LF	26	13	6	1	0	0	0	0	6	1	.077	2
Lloyd Merriman, PH	1	1	0	0	0	0	0	0	0	0	.000	0
Minnie Miñoso, LF, RF	139	517	79	149	26	7	10	70	76	43	.288	19
Les Moss, C	32	59	5	15	2	0	2	7	6	10	.254	0
Bob Nieman, RF, LF	99	272	36	77	11	2	11	53	36	37	.283	1
Ron Northey, RF	14	14	1	5	2	0	1	4	3	3	.357	0
Buddy Peterson, SS	6	21	7	6	1	0	0	2	3	2	.286	0
Bob Powell, PR	1	0	0	0	0	0	0	0	0	0	.000	0
Jim Rivera, RF, CF	147	454	71	120	24	4	10	52	62	59	.264	25
Vern Stephens, 3B	22	56	10	14	3	0	3	7	7	11	.250	0
Ed White, RF	3	4	0	2	0	0	0	0	1	1	.500	0

Player	G	AB	R	H	2B	3B	HR	RBI	BB	SO	AVG	SB
Harry Byrd, P	25	30	2	2	0	0	0	0	0	7	.067	0
Bob Chakales, P	7	2	0	0	0	0	0	0	0	0	.000	0
Sandy Consuegra, P	44	29	1	3	0	0	0	1	1	8	.103	0
Dick Donovan, P	40	76	10	17	0	0	1	5	9	26	.224	0
Fritz Dorish, P	13	3	0	1	0	0	0	0	0	0	.333	0
Mike Fornieles, P	28	29	6	3	1	0	0	1	0	5	.103	0
Jack Harshman, P	32	60	6	11	1	0	2	8	9	17	.183	0
Dixie Howell, P	35	21	0	8	0	0	0	1	0	8	.381	0
Connie Johnson, P	19	33	4	5	2	0	0	5	0	7	.152	0
Bob Keegan, P	18	18	0	6	0	0	0	2	1	3	.333	0
Morrie Martin, P	37	10	1	3	0	0	0	0	0	1	.300	0
Al Papai, P	7	2	0	0	0	0	0	0	0	1	.000	0
Billy Pierce, P	34	70	5	12	2	0	0	7	3	10	.171	1
Virgil Trucks, P	32	64	2	8	1	0	0	6	0	12	.125	0
Team totals	155	5220	725	1401	204	36	116	677	568	595	.268	69

=== Pitching ===
Note: W = Wins; L = Losses; ERA = Earned run average; G = Games pitched; GS = Games started; SV = Saves; IP = Innings pitched; H = Hits allowed; R = Runs allowed; ER = Earned runs allowed; HR = Home runs allowed; BB = Walks allowed; K = Strikeouts

Player	W	L	ERA	G	GS	SV	IP	H	R	ER	HR	BB	K
Harry Byrd	4	6	4.65	25	12	1	91.0	85	49	47	10	34	44
Bob Chakales	0	0	1.46	7	0	0	12.1	11	2	2	2	7	6
Sandy Consuegra	6	5	2.64	44	7	7	126.1	120	42	37	4	25	35
Dick Donovan	15	9	3.32	29	24	0	187.0	186	77	69	17	53	88
Fritz Dorish	2	0	1.59	13	0	1	17.0	16	4	3	0	10	6
Mike Fornieles	6	3	3.86	26	9	2	86.1	84	37	37	12	32	23
Ted Gray	0	0	18.00	2	1	0	3.0	9	6	6	0	2	1
Jack Harshman	11	7	3.36	32	23	0	179.1	144	74	67	16	100	116
Dixie Howell	8	3	2.93	35	0	9	73.2	70	27	24	1	30	25
Connie Johnson	7	4	3.45	17	16	0	99.0	95	40	38	5	52	72
Bob Keegan	2	5	5.83	18	11	0	58.2	83	39	38	4	29	29
Morrie Martin	2	3	3.63	37	0	2	52.0	50	27	21	4	22	22
Al Papai	0	0	3.86	7	0	0	11.2	10	5	5	1	10	5
Billy Pierce	15	10	1.97	33	26	1	205.2	162	50	45	16	69	157
Virgil Trucks	13	8	3.96	32	26	0	175.0	176	78	77	19	66	91
Team totals	91	63	3.37	155	155	23	1378.0	1301	557	516	111	541	720

== Farm system ==
Level	Team	League	Manager
AA	Memphis Chicks	Southern Association	Jack Cassini and Ted Lyons
A	Colorado Springs Sky Sox	Western League	Jack Conway
B	Waterloo White Hawks	Illinois–Indiana–Iowa League	Dutch Dorman and Willard Marshall
C	Superior Blues	Northern League	Walt Novick
D	Madisonville Miners	KITTY League	Bill Close
D	Dubuque Packers	Mississippi–Ohio Valley League	Ira Hutchinson

LEAGUE CHAMPIONS: Dubuque
Madisonville club folded, July 7, 1955
