= 1955 Washington Senators season =

1955 Washington Senators
- League: American League
- Ballpark: Griffith Stadium
- City: Washington, D.C.
- Record: 53–101 (.344)
- League place: 8th
- Owners: Clark Griffith (majority owner)
- Managers: Chuck Dressen
- Television: WTTG
- Radio: WWDC (FM) (Arch McDonald, Bob Wolff, Les Sands)

The 1955 Washington Senators season was the franchise's 55th in Major League Baseball. The Senators won 53 games, lost 101, and finished in eighth place in the American League. They were managed by Chuck Dressen and played home games at Griffith Stadium, where they draw 425,238 fans, eighth and last in the American League and 16th and last in MLB.

It was Dressen's first year as the Senators' manager, after Bucky Harris had led the 1954 club to a 66–88, a sixth-place finish. Dressen, 60, came to Washington two years removed from a highly successful three-year term as skipper of the Brooklyn Dodgers, where his teams finished in a dead heat for first in 1951 (losing the 1951 National League tie-breaker series on Bobby Thomson's famous home run), then won back-to-back NL titles in 1952 and 1953. But in each of the latter seasons, his Dodgers were defeated by the New York Yankees in the World Series, and when Dressen decided to demand a three-year contract to return to Brooklyn for 1954, his owner, Walter O'Malley, let his 1953 contract expire. Dressen spent 1954 managing Oakland in the highly competitive Pacific Coast League, and his return to the major leagues was viewed with anticipation by some observers.

His hiring was a departure for the Senators' management and ownership. He was the first manager outside the Washington team's "family" hired during Clark Griffith's presidency, which began in 1920. Through 1954, Griffith had appointed eight different men to manage his club (with one, Harris, serving three different terms), and all had been current or former Senator players. Dressen, as a veteran National Leaguer and a high-profile manager with New York ties, broke that 35-season trend.

And, though no one knew it at the time, 1955 would be a milestone for baseball in Washington when it proved to be Griffith's last season as the club's president and chief stockholder. He died at age 85 on October 27, and his nephew Calvin, who succeeded him, would move the franchise to Minneapolis–Saint Paul as the Minnesota Twins after only five seasons as the Senators' president.

== Offseason ==
- Prior to 1955 season: Choo-Choo Coleman was signed as an amateur free agent by the Senators.

== Regular season ==
=== Season standings ===
American League
Team	W	L	Pct.	GB	Home	Road
New York Yankees	96	58	.623	—	52‍–‍25	44‍–‍33
Cleveland Indians	93	61	.604	3	49‍–‍28	44‍–‍33
Chicago White Sox	91	63	.591	5	49‍–‍28	42‍–‍35
Boston Red Sox	84	70	.545	12	47‍–‍31	37‍–‍39
Detroit Tigers	79	75	.513	17	46‍–‍31	33‍–‍44
Kansas City Athletics	63	91	.409	33	33‍–‍43	30‍–‍48
Baltimore Orioles	57	97	.370	39	30‍–‍47	27‍–‍50
Washington Senators	53	101	.344	43	28‍–‍49	25‍–‍52

=== Record vs. opponents ===
1955 American League record Sources:
Team	BAL	BOS	CWS	CLE	DET	KCA	NYY	WSH
Baltimore	—	8–14	10–12–1	3–19	9–13	10–12–1	3–19	14–8
Boston	14–8	—	9–13	11–11	13–9	14–8	8–14	15–7
Chicago	12–10–1	13–9	—	10–12	14–8	14–8	11–11	17–5
Cleveland	19–3	11–11	12–10	—	12–10	17–5	13–9	9–13
Detroit	13–9	9–13	8–14	10–12	—	12–10	10–12	17–5
Kansas City	12–10–1	8–14	8–14	5–17	10–12	—	7–15	13–9
New York	19–3	14–8	11–11	9–13	12–10	15–7	—	16–6
Washington	8–14	7–15	5–17	13–9	5–17	9–13	6–16	—

=== Notable transactions ===
- May 1955: Gus Keriazakos was traded by the Senators to the Kansas City Athletics for Al Sima.
- June 7, 1955: Jim Busby was traded by the Senators to the Chicago White Sox for Bob Chakales, Clint Courtney and Johnny Groth.

=== Roster ===
1955 Washington Senators
Roster
Pitchers: 15 Ted Abernathy; 16 Bob Chakales; 21 Webbo Clarke; 30,43 Bill Currie; 16 Vince Gonzales; 32 Dick Hyde; 21 Mickey McDermott; 27 Camilo Pascual; 19 Bob Porterfield; 28 Pedro Ramos; 20 Johnny Schmitz; 17 Spec Shea; 24 Bunky Stewart; 18 Chuck Stobbs; 26 Dean Stone	Catchers: 14 Clint Courtney; 11 Bruce Edwards; 8 Ed Fitz Gerald; 29 Steve Korcheck; 9 Bob Oldis; Infielders: 39 Julio Bécquer; 34 Juan Delis; 12 Harmon Killebrew; 25 Bobby Kline; 36 Tony Roig; 5 Pete Runnels; 6 Jerry Snyder; 36 José Valdivielso; 3 Mickey Vernon; 1 Eddie Yost	Outfielders: 4 Jim Busby; 4 Johnny Groth; 14 Jim Lemon; 37 Ernie Oravetz; 31 Carlos Paula; 29 Jerry Schoonmaker; 2 Roy Sievers; 22 Tom Umphlett; Other batters: 35 Jesse Levan; 35 Tom Wright	Manager: 7 Chuck Dressen; Coaches: 54 Nick Altrock; 53 Ellis Clary; 52 Joe Fitzgerald; 55 Joe Haynes; 51 Cookie Lavagetto

== Player stats ==
=== Batting ===
==== Starters by position ====
Note: Pos = Position; G = Games played; AB = At bats; H = Hits; Avg. = Batting average; HR = Home runs; RBI = Runs batted in

Pos	Player	G	AB	H	Avg.	HR	RBI
C	Ed Fitz Gerald	74	236	56	.237	4	19
1B	Mickey Vernon	150	538	162	.301	14	85
2B	Pete Runnels	134	503	143	.284	2	49
SS	José Valdivielso	94	294	65	.221	2	28
3B	Eddie Yost	122	375	91	.243	7	48
LF	Roy Sievers	144	509	138	.271	25	106
CF	Tom Umphlett	110	323	70	.217	2	19
RF	Carlos Paula	115	351	105	.299	6	45

==== Other batters ====
Note: G = Games played; AB = At bats; H = Hits; Avg. = Batting average; HR = Home runs; RBI = Runs batted in

Player	G	AB	H	Avg.	HR	RBI
Ernie Oravetz	100	263	71	.270	0	25
Clint Courtney	75	238	71	.298	2	30
Jim Busby	47	191	44	.230	6	14
Johnny Groth	63	183	40	.219	2	17
Bobby Kline	77	140	31	.221	0	9
Juan Delis	54	132	25	.189	0	11
Jerry Snyder	46	107	24	.224	0	5
Harmon Killebrew	38	80	16	.200	4	7
Bruce Edwards	30	57	10	.175	0	3
Tony Roig	29	57	13	.228	0	4
Jerry Schoonmaker	20	46	7	.152	1	4
Steve Korcheck	13	36	10	.278	0	2
Jim Lemon	10	25	5	.200	1	3
Jesse Levan	16	16	3	.188	1	4
Julio Bécquer	10	14	3	.214	0	1
Tom Wright	7	7	0	.000	0	0
Bob Oldis	6	6	0	.000	0	0

=== Pitching ===
==== Starting pitchers ====
Note: G = Games pitched; IP = Innings pitched; W = Wins; L = Losses; ERA = Earned run average; SO = Strikeouts

Player	G	IP	W	L	ERA	SO
Bob Porterfield	30	178.0	10	17	4.45	74
Johnny Schmitz	32	165.0	7	10	3.71	49
Mickey McDermott	31	156.0	10	10	3.75	78

==== Other pitchers ====
Note: G = Games pitched; IP = Innings pitched; W = Wins; L = Losses; ERA = Earned run average; SO = Strikeouts

Player	G	IP	W	L	ERA	SO
Dean Stone	43	180.0	6	13	4.15	84
Chuck Stobbs	41	140.1	4	14	5.00	60
Pedro Ramos	45	130.0	5	11	3.88	34
Camilo Pascual	43	129.0	2	12	6.14	82
Ted Abernathy	40	119.1	5	9	5.96	79
Webbo Clarke	7	21.1	0	0	4.64	9
Bunky Stewart	7	15.1	0	0	4.11	10

==== Relief pitchers ====
Note: G = Games pitched; W = Wins; L = Losses; SV = Saves; ERA = Earned run average; SO = Strikeouts

Player	G	W	L	SV	ERA	SO
Bob Chakales	29	2	3	0	5.27	28
Spec Shea	27	2	2	2	3.99	16
Bill Currie	3	0	0	0	12.46	2
Dick Hyde	3	0	0	0	4.50	1
Vince Gonzales	1	0	0	0	27.00	1
Bobby Kline	1	0	0	0	27.00	0

== Award winners ==
All-Star Game

- Mickey Vernon, starter, first base

== Farm system ==
Level	Team	League	Manager
AA	Chattanooga Lookouts	Southern Association	Cal Ermer
A	Charlotte Hornets	Sally League	Jimmy Bloodworth
B	Hagerstown Packets	Piedmont League	Johnny Welaj
B	Rock Hill Chiefs	Tri-State League	Buster Boguskie, Frank Colasinski and Pete Treece
D	Orlando C.B.s	Florida State League	Tommy O'Brien
D	Fulton Lookouts	KITTY League	Ned Waldrop, Sam Lamitina, Mel Simons and Bob Harmon
D	Erie Senators	PONY League	Ted Sepkowski

LEAGUE CHAMPIONS: Orlando
