= 1955 Boston Red Sox season =

Major League Baseball season

1955 Boston Red Sox
- League: American League
- Ballpark: Fenway Park
- City: Boston, Massachusetts
- Record: 84–70 (.545)
- League place: 4th
- Owners: Tom Yawkey
- President: Tom Yawkey
- General managers: Joe Cronin
- Managers: Pinky Higgins
- Television: WBZ-TV, Ch. 4 and WNAC-TV, Ch. 7
- Radio: WHDH-AM 850 (Curt Gowdy, Bob Murphy, Tom Hussey)
- Stats: ESPN.com; Baseball Reference

The 1955 Boston Red Sox season was the 55th season of franchise of Major League Baseball history. The Red Sox finished fourth in the American League (AL) with a record of 84 wins and 70 losses, 12 games behind the New York Yankees.

== Offseason ==
- October 14, 1954: Owen Friend was purchased by the Red Sox from the Cleveland Indians.

== Regular season ==
After finishing fourth — but 42 games behind the pennant-winning Cleveland Indians — in 1954, the 1955 Red Sox improved substantially, gaining 15 games in the win column (although again finishing fourth). The Red Sox played especially well throughout the early and middle parts of the season, seemingly in pennant contention for the first time since 1950. Much of the improvement was ascribed to rookie manager Pinky Higgins, promoted to Boston after eight years as a skipper in the team's farm system.

But the Red Sox' improvement on the field was overshadowed by the sudden illness and death, on June 27, of the team's sophomore first baseman, Harry Agganis. Perhaps the most celebrated Boston-area athlete of the 20th century, the Lynn, Massachusetts, native had starred in football as the quarterback of the Boston University Terriers before signing a professional baseball contract with the Red Sox. He was batting .313 in 83 at bats on June 2 when he was initially taken ill with pneumonia. He died less than four weeks later, at 26, of a massive pulmonary embolism.

=== Season standings ===
American League
Team	W	L	Pct.	GB	Home	Road
New York Yankees	96	58	.623	—	52‍–‍25	44‍–‍33
Cleveland Indians	93	61	.604	3	49‍–‍28	44‍–‍33
Chicago White Sox	91	63	.591	5	49‍–‍28	42‍–‍35
Boston Red Sox	84	70	.545	12	47‍–‍31	37‍–‍39
Detroit Tigers	79	75	.513	17	46‍–‍31	33‍–‍44
Kansas City Athletics	63	91	.409	33	33‍–‍43	30‍–‍48
Baltimore Orioles	57	97	.370	39	30‍–‍47	27‍–‍50
Washington Senators	53	101	.344	43	28‍–‍49	25‍–‍52

=== Record vs. opponents ===
1955 American League record Sources:
Team	BAL	BOS	CWS	CLE	DET	KCA	NYY	WSH
Baltimore	—	8–14	10–12–1	3–19	9–13	10–12–1	3–19	14–8
Boston	14–8	—	9–13	11–11	13–9	14–8	8–14	15–7
Chicago	12–10–1	13–9	—	10–12	14–8	14–8	11–11	17–5
Cleveland	19–3	11–11	12–10	—	12–10	17–5	13–9	9–13
Detroit	13–9	9–13	8–14	10–12	—	12–10	10–12	17–5
Kansas City	12–10–1	8–14	8–14	5–17	10–12	—	7–15	13–9
New York	19–3	14–8	11–11	9–13	12–10	15–7	—	16–6
Washington	8–14	7–15	5–17	13–9	5–17	9–13	6–16	—

=== Opening Day lineup ===
10	Billy Goodman	2B
20	Eddie Joost	SS
26	Faye Throneberry	LF
4	Jackie Jensen	RF
8	Sammy White	C
3	Norm Zauchin	1B
12	Ted Lepcio	3B
37	Jimmy Piersall	CF
18	Frank Sullivan	P

=== Notable transactions ===
- June 12, 1955: Owen Friend was purchased from the Red Sox by the Chicago Cubs.

=== Roster ===
1955 Boston Red Sox
Roster
Pitchers: 40 Frank Baumann; 23 Tom Brewer; 42 Dick Brodowski; 27 Hal Brown; 14 Ike Delock; 25 Hersh Freeman; 29 Bill Henry; 28 Tom Hurd; 40 Russ Kemmerer; 19 Leo Kiely; 16 Ellis Kinder; 15 Willard Nixon; 17 Mel Parnell; 39 Bob Smith; 18 Frank Sullivan; 27 George Susce; 44 Joe Trimble	Catchers: 24 Pete Daley; 22 Jim Pagliaroni; 44 Haywood Sullivan; 8 Sammy White; Infielders: 6 Harry Agganis; 2 Milt Bolling; 11 Billy Consolo; 22 Owen Friend; 41 Dick Gernert; 10 Billy Goodman; 1 Grady Hatton; 20 Eddie Joost; 35 Billy Klaus; 12 Ted Lepcio; 43 Frank Malzone; 3 Norm Zauchin	Outfielders: 4 Jackie Jensen; 7 Sam Mele; 21 Karl Olson; 37 Jimmy Piersall; 38 Gene Stephens; 26 Faye Throneberry; 9 Ted Williams	Manager: 5 Pinky Higgins; Coaches: 32 Del Baker (First base); 31 Jack Burns (Third base); 33 Dave Ferriss (Pitching); 30 Mickey Owen (Bullpen); 34 Paul Schreiber (Hitting)

== Player stats ==
= Indicates team leader

=== Batting ===
==== Starters by position ====
Note: Pos = Position; G = Games played; AB = At bats; H = Hits; Avg. = Batting average; HR = Home runs; RBI = Runs batted in

Pos	Player	G	AB	H	Avg.	HR	RBI
C	Sammy White	143	544	142	.261	11	64
1B	Norm Zauchin	130	477	114	.239	27	93
2B	Billy Goodman	149	599	176	.294	0	52
SS	Billy Klaus	135	541	153	.283	7	60
3B	Grady Hatton	126	380	93	.245	4	49
LF	Ted Williams	98	320	114	.356	28	83
CF	Jim Piersall	149	515	146	.283	13	62
RF	Jackie Jensen	152	574	158	.275	26	116

==== Other batters ====
Note: G = Games played; AB = At bats; H = Hits; Avg. = Batting average; HR = Home runs; RBI = Runs batted in

Player	G	AB	H	Avg.	HR	RBI
Gene Stephens	109	157	46	.293	3	18
Faye Throneberry	60	144	37	.257	6	27
Ted Lepcio	51	134	31	.231	6	15
Eddie Joost	55	119	23	.193	5	17
Harry Agganis	25	83	26	.313	0	10
Pete Daley	17	50	11	.220	0	5
Karl Olson	26	48	12	.250	0	1
Owen Friend	14	42	11	.262	0	2
Sam Mele	14	31	4	.129	0	1
Frank Malzone	6	20	7	.350	0	1
Dick Gernert	7	20	4	.200	0	1
Billy Consolo	8	18	4	.222	0	0
Haywood Sullivan	2	6	0	.000	0	0
Milt Bolling	6	5	1	.200	0	0
Jim Pagliaroni	1	0	0	----	0	1

=== Pitching ===
= Indicates league leader

==== Starting pitchers ====
Note: G = Games pitched; IP = Innings pitched; W = Wins; L = Losses; ERA = Earned run average; SO = Strikeouts

Player	G	IP	W	L	ERA	SO
Frank Sullivan	35	260.0	18*	13	2.91	129
Willard Nixon	31	208.0	12	10	4.07	95
Tom Brewer	31	192.2	11	10	4.20	91

- Tied with Whitey Ford and Bob Lemon

==== Other pitchers ====
Note: G = Games pitched; IP = Innings pitched; W = Wins; L = Losses; ERA = Earned run average; SO = Strikeouts

Player	G	IP	W	L	ERA	SO
George Susce	29	144.1	9	7	3.06	60
Ike Delock	29	143.2	9	7	3.76	88
Bill Henry	17	59.2	2	4	3.32	23
Mel Parnell	13	46.0	2	3	7.83	18
Frank Baumann	7	34.0	2	1	5.82	27
Russ Kemmerer	7	17.1	1	1	7.27	13

==== Relief pitchers ====
Note: G = Games pitched; W = Wins; L = Losses; SV = Saves; ERA = Earned run average; SO = Strikeouts

Player	G	W	L	SV	ERA	SO
Ellis Kinder	43	5	5	18	2.84	31
Tom Hurd	43	8	6	5	3.01	48
Leo Kiely	33	3	3	6	2.80	36
Dick Brodowski	16	1	0	0	5.63	10
Hal Brown	2	1	0	0	2.25	2
Joe Trimble	2	0	0	0	0.00	1
Hersh Freeman	2	0	0	0	0.00	1
Bob Smith	1	0	0	0	0.00	1

== Farm system ==
Level	Team	League	Manager
AAA	Louisville Colonels	American Association	Red Marion
A	Montgomery Rebels	Sally League	Eddie Popowski and Fred Maguire
B	Greensboro Patriots	Carolina League	Elmer Yoter
C	San Jose Red Sox	California League	Sheriff Robinson
D	Bluefield Blue-Grays	Appalachian League	Len Okrie
D	Corning Red Sox	PONY League	Glenn Wright
