= 1950 Boston Red Sox season =

Major League Baseball season

1950 Boston Red Sox
- League: American League
- Ballpark: Fenway Park
- City: Boston, Massachusetts
- Record: 94–60 (.610)
- League place: 3rd
- Owners: Tom Yawkey
- President: Tom Yawkey
- General managers: Joe Cronin
- Managers: Joe McCarthy, Steve O'Neill
- Television: WBZ-TV/WNAC-TV (Jim Britt, Tom Hussey, Bump Hadley)
- Radio: WHDH (Jim Britt, Tom Hussey, Leo Egan)
- Stats: ESPN.com; Baseball Reference

The 1950 Boston Red Sox season was the 50th season in the franchise's Major League Baseball history. The Red Sox finished third in the American League (AL) with a record of 94 wins and 60 losses, four games behind the AL and World Series champion New York Yankees. This was the last time that the Red Sox won at least 90 games until their return to the World Series in 1967.

The team scored 1,027 runs, one of only six teams to score more than 1,000 runs in a season in the modern era (post-1900), and, along with the 1999 Cleveland Indians, are one of two teams to do so post-World War II. The 1950 Red Sox compiled a .302 batting average, and remain the most recent major league team to record a .300 or higher team batting average for a season.

== Offseason ==
=== Trades and Transactions ===
- October 24, 1949: It is reported that Dick Gernert, a junior at Temple University, has signed with the Red Sox over the weekend.
- November 17, 1949: The Red Sox draft pitcher George Copeland from the Rochester Red Wings for $10,000.
- December 1, 1949: The Red Sox purchase pitcher Al Papai from the St. Louis Browns off waivers for $10,000.
- February 26, 1950: The Red Sox announce the sale of pitcher Jack Kramer to the New York Giants for a reported sum of $25,000.
- April 14, 1950: The Red Sox sign third baseman Ken Keltner as a free agent.

== Regular season ==
In a game on June 8, the Red Sox set a major league record for total bases by a team in one game, which still stands. During their 29–4 win over the St. Louis Browns, the Red Sox collected 28 hits: 7 home runs, 1 triple, 9 doubles, and 11 singles for 60 total bases. The Red Sox, who had already beaten the Browns 20–4 the day before, became only the second team since 1901 (after the 1925 Pittsburgh Pirates) to score 20 or more runs in consecutive games.

The team's 24–6 (.800) record during August equalled a franchise record for highest winning percentage for a month that had been established by the 1901 Boston Americans when they were 20–5 (.800) during June; the record was finally surpassed when the 2026 Red Sox were 21–4 (.840) during July.

=== Game log ===
Boston Win	Boston Loss	Tie Game

1950 Boston Red Sox Season Log: 94─60
April (7─6)

#	Date	Opponent	Score	Win	Loss	Save	Record	Box Score
1	April 18	Vs. New York	15─10	Johnson (1–0)	Masterson (0–1)	Page (1)	0─1	
2	April 19 (1)	Vs. New York	3─6	Dobson (1─0)	Raschi (0─1)	─	1─1	
3	April 19 (2)	Vs. New York	16─7	Lopat (1─0)	Kinder (0─1)	Page (2)	1─2	
4	April 21	@ Athletics	8─2	McDermott (1─0)	Brissie (0─1)	─	2─2	
5	April 22	@ Athletics	5─6	Kellner (1─0)	Kinder (0─2)	─	2─3	
6	April 23 (1)	@ Athletics	4─9	Shantz (1─0)	Dobson (1─1)	Hooper (2)	2─4	
7	April 23 (2)	@ Athletics	12─2	Parnell (1─0)	Wyse (1─1)	─	3─4	
8	April 24	@ Washington	0─3	Scarborough (2─0)	Papai (0─1)	─	3─5	
9	April 26	@ New York	2─10	Lopat (2─0)	McDermott (1─1)	─	3─6	
10	April 27	@ New York	7─2	Kinder (1─2)	Byrne (0─1)	─	4─6	
11	April 28	Vs. Athletics	1─4	Parnell (2─0)	Kellner (1─1)	─	5─6	
12	April 30 (1)	Vs. Athletics	0─19	Dobson (2─1)	Fowler (0─1)	─	6─6	
13	April 30 (2)	Vs. Athletics	5─6	Stobbs (1─0)	Wyse (1─2)	Papai (1)	7─6	

May

#	Date	Opponent	Score	Win	Loss	Save	Record	Box Score
14	May 2	Vs. Cleveland	1─6	McDermott (2─1)	Garcia (0─1)	─	8─6	
15	May 3	Vs. Cleveland	2─7	Kinder (2─1)	Feller (2─1)	─	9─6	
16	May 4	Vs. Cleveland	5─4	Lemon (2─1)	Parnell (2─1)	─	9─7	
17	May 5	Vs. Chicago	2─5	Dobson (3─1)	Pierce (1─1)	─	10─7	
18	May 6	Vs. Chicago	1─11	Stobbs (2─0)	Holcolmbe (0─1)	─	11─7	
19	May 7 (1)	Vs. St. Louis	6─8	Schanz (1─0)	Fine (0─1)	Masterson (1)	12─7	
20	May 7 (2)	Vs. St. Louis	2─6	Papai (1─1)	Fannin (0─1)	─	13─7	
21	May 9	Vs. Detroit	1─6	Parnell (3─1)	Trucks (2─1)	─	14─7	
22	May 11 (1)	Vs. Detroit	13─4	Hutchinson (2─1)	Dobson (3─2)	─	14─8	
23	May 11 (2)	Vs. Detroit	5─3	Gray (2─1)	Kinder (2─3)	Houtteman (2)	14─9	
24	May 12	Vs. Washington	1─3	McDermott (3─1)	Scarborough (2─3)	─	15─9	
25	May 13	Vs. Washington	4─5	Masterson (1─1)	Hudson (3─2)	Dobson (1)	16─9	
26	May 14 (1)	Vs. Washington	1─8	Parnell (4─1)	Hittle (1─1)	─	17─9	
27	May 14 (2)	Vs. Washington	10─5	Weik (1─1)	Papai (1─1)	Marrero (1)	17─10	
28	May 16	@ Detroit	6─1	Dobson (4─2)	Houtteman (4─2)	─	18─10	
29	May 17	@ Detroit	3─6	Ted Gray (3─1)	Kinder (2─4)	─	18─11	
30	May 18	@ Detroit	13─2	Papai (2─2)	Fred Hutchinson (2─2)	Dobson (2)	19─11	
31	May 19	@ Cleveland	1─4	Sam Zoldak (1─1)	Parnell (4─2)	─	19─12	
32	May 20	@ Cleveland	5─8	Bob Lemon (4─2)	Chuck Stobbs (2─1)	─	19─13	
33	May 21 (1)	@ Chicago	7─0	Kinder (3─4)	Bill Wight (2─4)	─	20─13	
34	May 21 (2)	@Chicago	3─4	Billy Pierce (2─3)	Joe Dobson (4─3)	─	20─14	

=== Trades and transactions ===
- May 7: The Red Sox in a trade with the Washington Senators send outfielder Tommy O'Brien and infielder Merrill Combs to the Senators in exchange for outfielder Clyde Vollmer.
- May 8: The Red Sox sell pitcher Harry Dorish to the St. Louis Browns for an undisclosed amount of cash.
- May 15: The Red Sox unconditionally and unceremoniously release the only Black player in their organization, Piper Davis, from their Scranton affiliate after he plays only 15 games. Davis, 33, is leading the team—which is 2–13 and last in the Class A Eastern League—in doubles (four), home runs (three), and runs batted in (ten), with a batting average of .333. "What does a player have to do make the grade?" a frustrated Davis asks a local sportswriter. Tom Yawkey's Red Sox will take nine more years before breaking the baseball color line.
- June 2: Tom Umphlett reveals that he has recently signed a contract with the Red Sox as an amateur free agent.
- June 7: The Red Sox sign outfielder Neil Chrisley as an amateur free agent.
- June 21: The Red Sox sign amateur free agent Faye Throneberry on a $6000 contract.

=== Season standings ===
American League
Team	W	L	Pct.	GB	Home	Road
New York Yankees	98	56	.636	—	53‍–‍24	45‍–‍32
Detroit Tigers	95	59	.617	3	50‍–‍30	45‍–‍29
Boston Red Sox	94	60	.610	4	55‍–‍22	39‍–‍38
Cleveland Indians	92	62	.597	6	49‍–‍28	43‍–‍34
Washington Senators	67	87	.435	31	35‍–‍42	32‍–‍45
Chicago White Sox	60	94	.390	38	35‍–‍42	25‍–‍52
St. Louis Browns	58	96	.377	40	27‍–‍47	31‍–‍49
Philadelphia Athletics	52	102	.338	46	29‍–‍48	23‍–‍54

=== Record vs. opponents ===
1950 American League record Sources:
Team	BOS	CWS	CLE	DET	NYY	PHA	SLB	WSH
Boston	—	15–7	10–12	10–12	9–13	19–3	19–3	12–10
Chicago	7–15	—	8–14	6–16–2	8–14	11–11	12–10	8–14
Cleveland	12–10	14–8	—	13–9–1	8–14	17–5	13–9	15–7
Detroit	12–10	16–6–2	9–13–1	—	11–11	17–5	17–5	13–9
New York	13–9	14–8	14–8	11–11	—	15–7	17–5	14–8–1
Philadelphia	3–19	11–11	5–17	5–17	7–15	—	8–14	13–9
St. Louis	3–19	10–12	9–13	5–17	5–17	14–8	—	12–10
Washington	10–12	14–8	7–15	9–13	8–14–1	9–13	10–12	—

=== Opening Day lineup ===
7	Dom DiMaggio	CF
6	Johnny Pesky	3B
9	Ted Williams	LF
5	Vern Stephens	SS
2	Al Zarilla	RF
1	Bobby Doerr	2B
10	Billy Goodman	1B
14	Matt Batts	C
17	Mel Parnell	P

=== Roster ===
1950 Boston Red Sox
Roster
Pitchers: 12 James Atkins; 15 Joe Dobson; 33 Dave Ferriss; 21 Bob Gillespie; 12 Earl Johnson; 16 Ellis Kinder; 34 Dick Littlefield; 26 Phil Marchildon; 20 Walt Masterson; 19 Mickey McDermott; 26 Jim McDonald; 25 Gordie Mueller; 21 Willard Nixon; 34 Al Papai; 17 Mel Parnell; 26 Frank Quinn; 18 Charley Schanz; 22 Chuck Stobbs; 37 Jim Suchecki; 35 Harry Taylor	Catchers: 14 Matt Batts; 11 Buddy Rosar; 39 Bob Scherbarth; 8 Birdie Tebbetts; Infielders: 1 Bobby Doerr; 3 Walt Dropo; 39 Fred Hatfield; 4 Ken Keltner; 6 Johnny Pesky; 5 Vern Stephens; 27 Lou Stringer	Outfielders: 7 Dom DiMaggio; 37 Charlie Maxwell; 10 Billy Goodman; 23 Tommy O'Brien; 24 Jimmy Piersall; 23 Clyde Vollmer; 9 Ted Williams; 28 Tom Wright; 2 Al Zarilla; Other batters: 24 Merl Combs	Manager: -- Joe McCarthy; 30 Steve O'Neill; Coaches: 32 Earle Combs (First base); 30 Steve O'Neill (Third base); 31 Paul Schreiber (Hitting); 29 Johnny Schulte (Bullpen); 36 George Susce (Bullpen)

== Player stats ==
= Indicates team leader

= Indicates league leader

=== Batting ===
==== Starters by position ====
Note: Pos = Position; G = Games played; AB = At bats; H = Hits; R = Runs; Avg. = Batting average; HR = Home runs; RBI = Runs batted in; SB = Stolen bases

Pos	Player	G	AB	H	R	Avg.	HR	RBI	SB
C	Birdie Tebbetts	79	268	83	33	.310	8	45	1
1B	Walter Dropo	136	559	180	101	.322	34	144	0
2B	Bobby Doerr	149	586	172	103	.294	27	120	3
SS	Vern Stephens	149	628	185	125	.295	30	144	1
3B	Johnny Pesky	127	490	153	112	.312	1	49	2
OF	Al Zarilla	130	471	153	92	.325	9	74	2
OF	Ted Williams	89	334	106	82	.317	28	97	3
OF	Dom DiMaggio	141	588	193	131	.328	7	70	15

==== Other batters ====
Note: G = Games played; AB = At bats; H = Hits; Avg. = Batting average; HR = Home runs; RBI = Runs batted in

Player	G	AB	H	Avg.	HR	RBI
Billy Goodman	110	424	150	.354	4	68
Matt Batts	75	238	65	.273	4	34
Clyde Vollmer	57	169	48	.284	7	37
Tom Wright	54	107	34	.318	0	20
Buddy Rosar	27	84	25	.298	1	12
Tommy O'Brien	9	31	4	.129	0	3
Ken Keltner	13	28	9	.321	0	2
Lou Stringer	24	17	5	.294	0	2
Fred Hatfield	10	12	3	.250	0	2
Jim Piersall	6	11	4	.364	0	0
Charlie Maxwell	3	8	0	.000	0	0
Merl Combs	1	0	0	----	0	0
Bob Scherbarth	1	0	0	----	0	0

=== Pitching ===
==== Starting pitchers ====
Note: G = Games pitched; IP = Innings pitched; W = Wins; L = Losses; ERA = Earned run average; SO = Strikeouts

Player	G	IP	W	L	ERA	SO
Mel Parnell	40	249.0	18	10	3.61	93
Joe Dobson	39	206.2	15	10	4.18	81
Chuck Stobbs	32	169.1	12	7	5.10	78
Willard Nixon	22	101.1	8	6	6.04	57

==== Other pitchers ====
Note: G = Games pitched; IP = Innings pitched; W = Wins; L = Losses; ERA = Earned run average; SO = Strikeouts

Player	G	IP	W	L	ERA	SO
Ellis Kinder	48	207.0	14	12	4.26	95
Mickey McDermott	38	130.0	7	3	5.19	96
Walt Masterson	33	129.1	8	6	5.64	60
Harry Taylor	3	19.0	2	0	1.42	8

==== Relief pitchers ====
Note: G = Games pitched; W = Wins; L = Losses; SV = Saves; ERA = Earned run average; SO = Strikeouts

Player	G	W	L	SV	ERA	SO
Al Papai	16	4	2	2	6.75	19
Dick Littlefield	15	2	2	1	9.26	13
Charley Schanz	14	3	2	0	8.34	14
Earl Johnson	11	0	0	0	7.24	6
Jim McDonald	9	1	0	0	3.79	5
Gordie Mueller	8	0	0	0	10.29	1
Jim Suchecki	4	0	0	0	4.50	3
James Atkins	1	0	0	0	3.86	0
Dave Ferriss	1	0	0	0	18.00	1
Bob Gillespie	1	0	0	0	20.25	0
Frank Quinn	1	0	0	0	9.00	0
Phil Marchildon	1	0	0	0	6.75	0

=== Awards and Records ===
Name	Award	Refs.
Walt Dropo	American League Rookie of the Year	
Walt Dropo	RBI MLB Leader (144)	
Vern Stephens	RBI MLB Leader (144)	
Billy Goodman	MLB Batting Champion	

== Farm system ==
Level	Team	League	Manager
AAA	Louisville Colonels	American Association	Mike Ryba
AA	Birmingham Barons	Southern Association	Pinky Higgins
A	Scranton Red Sox	Eastern League	Jack Burns
B	Roanoke Red Sox	Piedmont League	Red Marion
C	San Jose Red Sox	California League	Marv Owen
C	Oneonta Red Sox	Canadian–American League	Eddie Popowski
D	Kinston Eagles	Coastal Plain League	Wally Millies
D	Marion Red Sox	Ohio–Indiana League	George Susce and Elmer Yoter

LEAGUE CHAMPIONS: Roanoke, Marion
