= 1952 Cleveland Indians season =

1952 Cleveland Indians
- League: American League
- Ballpark: Cleveland Municipal Stadium
- City: Cleveland, Ohio
- Owners: Ellis Ryan
- General managers: Hank Greenberg
- Managers: Al López
- Television: WXEL (Bob Neal, Red Jones)
- Radio: WERE (Jack Graney, Jimmy Dudley)

The 1952 Cleveland Indians season was a season in American baseball. The team finished second in the American League with a record of 93–61, just two games behind the New York Yankees.

== Regular season ==
=== Season standings ===
American League
Team	W	L	Pct.	GB	Home	Road
New York Yankees	95	59	.617	—	49‍–‍28	46‍–‍31
Cleveland Indians	93	61	.604	2	49‍–‍28	44‍–‍33
Chicago White Sox	81	73	.526	14	44‍–‍33	37‍–‍40
Philadelphia Athletics	79	75	.513	16	45‍–‍32	34‍–‍43
Washington Senators	78	76	.506	17	42‍–‍35	36‍–‍41
Boston Red Sox	76	78	.494	19	50‍–‍27	26‍–‍51
St. Louis Browns	64	90	.416	31	42‍–‍35	22‍–‍55
Detroit Tigers	50	104	.325	45	32‍–‍45	18‍–‍59

=== Record vs. opponents ===
1952 American League record Sources:
Team	BOS	CWS	CLE	DET	NYY	PHA	SLB	WSH
Boston	—	12–10	9–13	16–6	8–14	12–10	11–11	8–14
Chicago	10–12	—	8–14–1	17–5	8–14	11–11	14–8	13–9–1
Cleveland	13–9	14–8–1	—	16–6	10–12	13–9	15–7	12–10
Detroit	6–16	5–17	6–16	—	9–13	5–17–1	8–14	11–11–1
New York	14–8	14–8	12–10	13–9	—	13–9	14–8	15–7
Philadelphia	10–12	11–11	9–13	17–5–1	9–13	—	14–8	9–13
St. Louis	11–11	8–14	7–15	14–8	8–14	8–14	—	8–14–1
Washington	14–8	9–13–1	10–12	11–11–1	7–15	13–9	14–8–1	—

=== Notable transactions ===
- June 7, 1952: Herb Score was signed as an amateur free agent by the Indians.
- August 7, 1952: Wally Westlake was purchased by the Indians from the Cincinnati Reds.

=== Roster ===
1952 Cleveland Indians
Roster
Pitchers: 18 Bill Abernathie; 12 Lou Brissie; 29 Bob Chakales; 19 Bob Feller; 25 Mike Garcia; 27 Steve Gromek; 20 Mickey Harris; 22 Sam Jones; 21 Bob Lemon; 26 Dick Rozek; 29 Ted Wilks; 24 Early Wynn; 17 George Zuverink	Catchers: 4 Jim Hegan; 15 Birdie Tebbetts; 18 Joe Tipton; 16 Quincy Trouppe; Infielders: 1 Bobby Ávila; 2 Johnny Berardino; 8 Ray Boone; 11 Merl Combs; 9 Luke Easter; 6 Bill Glynn; 5 Hank Majeski; 7 Al Rosen; 5 Snuffy Stirnweiss; 2 George Strickland	Outfielders: 14 Larry Doby; 31 Jim Fridley; 33 Bob Kennedy; 32 Barney McCosky; 3 Dale Mitchell; 6 Dave Pope; 23 Pete Reiser; 35 Harry Simpson; 31 Wally Westlake	Manager: 10 Al López; Coaches: 44 Tony Cuccinello (Third Base); 42 Jake Flowers (First Base); 43 Mel Harder (Pitching); 40 Bill Lobe (Bullpen)

== Player stats ==
=== Batting ===
==== Starters by position ====
Note: Pos = Position; G = Games played; AB = At bats; H = Hits; Avg. = Batting average; HR = Home runs; RBI = Runs batted in

Pos	Player	G	AB	H	Avg.	HR	RBI
C	Jim Hegan	112	333	75	.225	4	41
1B	Luke Easter	127	437	115	.263	31	97
2B	Bobby Ávila	150	597	179	.300	7	45
SS	Ray Boone	103	316	83	.263	7	45
3B	Al Rosen	148	567	171	.302	28	105
OF	Larry Doby	140	519	143	.276	32	104
OF	Harry Simpson	146	545	145	.266	10	65
OF	Dale Mitchell	134	511	165	.323	5	58

==== Other batters ====
Note: G = Games played; AB = At bats; H = Hits; Avg. = Batting average; HR = Home runs; RBI = Runs batted in

Player	G	AB	H	Avg.	HR	RBI
Jim Fridley	62	175	44	.251	4	16
Merl Combs	52	139	23	.165	1	10
Joe Tipton	43	105	26	.248	6	22
Birdie Tebbetts	42	101	25	.248	1	8
Bill Glynn	44	92	25	.272	2	7
George Strickland	31	88	19	.216	1	8
Barney McCosky	54	80	17	.213	1	6
Wally Westlake	29	69	16	.232	1	9
Hank Majeski	36	54	16	.296	0	9
Pete Reiser	34	44	6	.136	3	7
Bob Kennedy	22	40	12	.300	0	12
Dave Pope	12	34	10	.294	1	4
Johnny Berardino	35	32	3	.094	0	2
Quincy Trouppe	12	10	1	.100	0	0
Snuffy Stirnweiss	1	0	0	----	0	0

=== Pitching ===
==== Starting pitchers ====
Note: G = Games pitched; IP = Innings pitched; W = Wins; L = Losses; ERA = Earned run average; SO = Strikeouts

Player	G	IP	W	L	ERA	SO
Bob Lemon	42	309.2	22	11	2.50	131
Mike Garcia	46	292.1	22	11	2.37	143
Early Wynn	42	285.2	23	12	2.90	153
Bob Feller	30	191.2	9	13	4.74	81

==== Other pitchers ====
Note: G = Games pitched; IP = Innings pitched; W = Wins; L = Losses; ERA = Earned run average; SO = Strikeouts

Player	G	IP	W	L	ERA	SO
Steve Gromek	29	122.2	7	7	3.67	65
Sam Jones	14	36.0	2	3	7.25	28
Bob Chakales	5	12.0	1	2	9.75	7

==== Relief pitchers ====
Note: G = Games pitched; W = Wins; L = Losses; SV = Saves; ERA = Earned run average; SO = Strikeouts

Player	G	W	L	SV	ERA	SO
Lou Brissie	42	3	2	2	3.48	28
Mickey Harris	29	3	0	1	4.63	23
Dick Rozek	10	1	0	0	4.97	5
Ted Wilks	7	0	0	1	3.86	6
Bill Abernathie	1	0	0	0	13.50	0
George Zuverink	1	0	0	0	0.00	1

== Farm system ==
Level	Team	League	Manager
AAA	Indianapolis Indians	American Association	Gene Desautels
AA	Dallas Eagles	Texas League	L. D. Meyer
A	Reading Indians	Eastern League	Kerby Farrell
A	Wichita Indians	Western League	Ralph Winegarner
B	Cedar Rapids Indians	Illinois–Indiana–Iowa League	Jimmy Bloodworth
B	Spartanburg Peaches	Tri-State League	Pinky May
C	Bakersfield Indians	California League	Gene Lillard
C	Fort Smith Indians	Western Association	Harry Griswold
D	Daytona Beach Islanders	Florida State League	Red Kress
D	Green Bay Blue Jays	Wisconsin State League	Phil Seghi
