= 1955 Detroit Tigers season =

Major League Baseball season

1955 Detroit Tigers
- League: American League
- Ballpark: Briggs Stadium
- City: Detroit, Michigan
- Record: 79–75 (.513)
- League place: 5th
- Owners: Walter Briggs, Jr.
- General managers: Muddy Ruel
- Managers: Bucky Harris
- Television: WJBK
- Radio: WKMH (Van Patrick, Dizzy Trout)

The 1955 Detroit Tigers season was a season in American baseball. The team finished fifth in the American League with a record of 79–75, 17 games behind the New York Yankees.

Al Kaline became the youngest major league player to win the American League (AL) batting title at 20 years old which still stands to this day. He hit .340 for the season, 21 points better than runner-up Vic Power. Kaline finished runner-up to Yogi Berra in the 1955 MVP voting.

== Offseason ==
- December 6, 1954: Walt Dropo, Ted Gray and Bob Nieman were traded by the Tigers to the Chicago White Sox for Leo Cristante, Ferris Fain, and Jack Phillips.

== Regular season ==
=== Season standings ===
American League
Team	W	L	Pct.	GB	Home	Road
New York Yankees	96	58	.623	—	52‍–‍25	44‍–‍33
Cleveland Indians	93	61	.604	3	49‍–‍28	44‍–‍33
Chicago White Sox	91	63	.591	5	49‍–‍28	42‍–‍35
Boston Red Sox	84	70	.545	12	47‍–‍31	37‍–‍39
Detroit Tigers	79	75	.513	17	46‍–‍31	33‍–‍44
Kansas City Athletics	63	91	.409	33	33‍–‍43	30‍–‍48
Baltimore Orioles	57	97	.370	39	30‍–‍47	27‍–‍50
Washington Senators	53	101	.344	43	28‍–‍49	25‍–‍52

=== Record vs. opponents ===
1955 American League record Sources:
Team	BAL	BOS	CWS	CLE	DET	KCA	NYY	WSH
Baltimore	—	8–14	10–12–1	3–19	9–13	10–12–1	3–19	14–8
Boston	14–8	—	9–13	11–11	13–9	14–8	8–14	15–7
Chicago	12–10–1	13–9	—	10–12	14–8	14–8	11–11	17–5
Cleveland	19–3	11–11	12–10	—	12–10	17–5	13–9	9–13
Detroit	13–9	9–13	8–14	10–12	—	12–10	10–12	17–5
Kansas City	12–10–1	8–14	8–14	5–17	10–12	—	7–15	13–9
New York	19–3	14–8	11–11	9–13	12–10	15–7	—	16–6
Washington	8–14	7–15	5–17	13–9	5–17	9–13	6–16	—

=== Roster ===
1955 Detroit Tigers
Roster
Pitchers: 22 Al Aber; 19 Babe Birrer; 14 Bud Black; 15 Jim Bunning; 12 Joe Coleman; 22 Leo Cristante; 26 Van Fletcher; 40 Ben Flowers; 36 Paul Foytack; 38 Bill Froats; 31 Ned Garver; 38,44 Billy Hoeft; 17 Frank Lary; 46 Duke Maas; 37 Dick Marlowe; 28 Bob Miller; 19 Bob Schultz; 15 George Zuverink	Catchers: 2 Frank House; 40 Walt Streuli; 10 Red Wilson; Infielders: 16 Reno Bertoia; 8 Ray Boone; 3 Ferris Fain; 1 Fred Hatfield; 7 Harvey Kuenn; 21,25 Harry Malmberg; 30 Jack Phillips; 8 Jay Porter; 25,37 Ron Samford; 9 Earl Torgeson	Outfielders: 24 Jim Delsing; 6 Al Kaline; 21 Chick King; 4 Charlie Maxwell; 11 Bubba Phillips; 20,21 Jim Small; 5 Bill Tuttle; Other batters: 4 Wayne Belardi; 12 Steve Souchock	Manager: 32 Bucky Harris; Coaches: 34 Billy Hitchcock; 33 Schoolboy Rowe; 35 Jack Tighe

== Player stats ==
=== Batting ===
==== Starters by position ====
Note: Pos = Position; G = Games played; AB = At bats; H = Hits; Avg. = Batting average; HR = Home runs; RBI = Runs batted in

Pos	Player	G	AB	H	Avg.	HR	RBI
C	Frank House	102	328	85	.259	15	53
1B	Earl Torgeson	89	300	85	.283	9	50
2B	Fred Hatfield	122	413	96	.232	8	33
SS	Harvey Kuenn	145	620	190	.306	8	62
3B	Ray Boone	135	500	142	.284	20	116
LF	Jim Delsing	114	356	85	.239	10	60
CF	Bill Tuttle	154	603	168	.279	14	78
RF	Al Kaline	152	588	200	.340	27	102

==== Other batters ====
Note: G = Games played; AB = At bats; H = Hits; Avg. = Batting average; HR = Home runs; RBI = Runs batted in

Player	G	AB	H	Avg.	HR	RBI
Red Wilson	78	241	53	.220	2	17
Harry Malmberg	67	208	45	.216	0	19
Bubba Phillips	95	184	43	.234	3	23
Ferris Fain	58	140	37	.264	2	23
Jack Phillips	55	117	37	.316	1	20
Charlie Maxwell	55	109	29	.266	7	18
Reno Bertoia	38	68	14	.206	1	10
Jay Porter	24	55	13	.236	0	3
Chick King	7	21	5	.238	0	0
Walt Streuli	2	4	1	.250	0	1
Jim Small	12	4	0	.000	0	0
Wayne Belardi	3	3	0	.000	0	0
Bud Souchock	1	1	1	1.000	0	1
Ron Samford	1	1	0	.000	0	0

=== Pitching ===
==== Starting pitchers ====
Note: G = Games pitched; IP = Innings pitched; W = Wins; L = Losses; ERA = Earned run average; SO = Strikeouts

Player	G	IP	W	L	ERA	SO
Frank Lary	36	235.0	14	15	3.10	98
Ned Garver	33	230.2	12	16	3.98	83
Billy Hoeft	32	220.0	16	7	2.99	133
Steve Gromek	28	181.0	13	10	3.98	73
Duke Maas	18	86.2	5	6	4.88	42

==== Other pitchers ====
Note: G = Games pitched; IP = Innings pitched; W = Wins; L = Losses; ERA = Earned run average; SO = Strikeouts

Player	G	IP	W	L	ERA	SO
Jim Bunning	15	51.0	3	5	6.35	37
Bob Miller	7	25.1	2	1	2.49	11
Dick Marlowe	4	15.0	1	0	1.80	9
Bud Black	3	14.0	1	1	1.29	7

==== Relief pitchers ====
Note: G = Games pitched; W = Wins; L = Losses; SV = Saves; ERA = Earned run average; SO = Strikeouts

Player	G	W	L	SV	ERA	SO
Al Aber	39	6	3	3	3.38	37
Babe Birrer	36	4	3	3	4.15	28
Paul Foytack	22	0	1	0	5.26	38
Leo Cristante	20	0	1	0	3.19	9
Joe Coleman	17	2	1	3	3.20	5
George Zuverink	14	0	5	0	6.99	13
Van Fletcher	9	0	0	0	3.00	4
Ben Flowers	4	0	0	0	6.00	2
Bill Froats	1	0	0	0	0.00	0
Bob Schultz	1	0	0	0	20.25	0

== Farm system ==
Level	Team	League	Manager
AAA	Buffalo Bisons	International League	Dan Carnevale
AA	Little Rock Travelers	Southern Association	Bob Mavis and Steve Souchock
A	Augusta Tigers	Sally League	Charlie Metro
B	Durham Bulls	Carolina League	Frank Skaff
B	Terre Haute Tigers	Illinois–Indiana–Iowa League	Stubby Overmire
C	Greenville Bucks	Cotton States League	Willis Hudlin, Luther Tucker, Banks McDowell and Daniel Ryan
C	Idaho Falls Russets	Pioneer League	Pat Mullin
D	Panama City Fliers	Alabama–Florida League	Bill Adair
D	Valdosta Tigers	Georgia–Florida League	Stan Wasiak
D	Jamestown Falcons	PONY League	Tony Lupien

LEAGUE CHAMPIONS: Panama City
