= Scheerbart =

Scheerbart, Scheerbarth are surname of:

- Paul Scheerbart

== Scherbart ==
- Hans Scherbart

== Scherbarth ==
- Eva Scherbarth (born 1929), German author, illustrator
- Günter Scherbarth (1930–2000), German graphic artist, painter
- Robert "Bob" Elmer Scherbarth (1926–2009), a catcher in Major League Baseball
- Tobias Scherbarth (born 1985), German athlete
