= Bob Keegan (baseball) =

American baseball player (1920–2001)

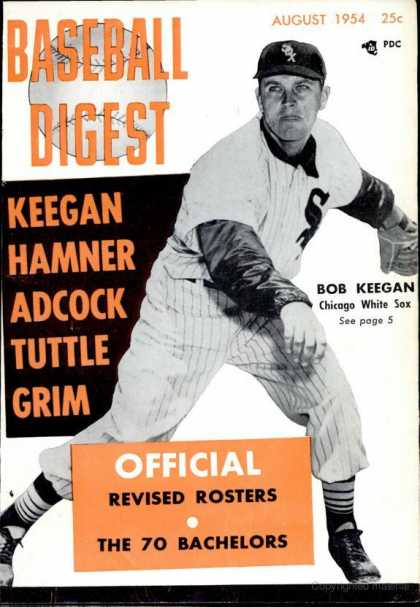
- Pitcher
- Born: August 4, 1920; Rochester, New York, U.S.
- Died: June 20, 2001 (aged 80); Rochester, New York, U.S.
- Batted: Right Threw: Right

MLB debut
- May 24, 1953, for the Chicago White Sox

Last MLB appearance
- July 24, 1958, for the Chicago White Sox

MLB statistics
- Win–loss record: 40–36
- Earned run average: 3.66
- Strikeouts: 198
- Stats at Baseball Reference

Teams
- Chicago White Sox (1953–1958)

Career highlights and awards
- All-Star (1954); Pitched a No-hitter on August 20, 1957

Robert Charles Keegan (August 4, 1920 – June 20, 2001) was an American right-handed pitcher in Major League Baseball for the Chicago White Sox from 1953 to 1958. A native of Rochester, New York, he attended Bucknell University and performed World War II service in the United States Army before being signed by New York Yankees scout Lou Maguolo. His professional career began in 1946 in the Class A Eastern League when Keegan was 25.

== Pitching career ==
Keegan was listed as 6 feet 2 inches (1.88 m) tall and 207 pounds (94 kg). He was 32 years old when he made the 1953 White Sox' varsity roster, and in his sophomore season, 1954, he was selected to the American League All-Star team. In the game, played July 13 at Cleveland Stadium, Keegan started the eighth inning in relief with the Junior Circuit ahead, 8–7. Keegan retired his first batter, Randy Jackson, then surrendered a single to Willie Mays. He struck out Roy Campanella, but then gave up a pinch hit home run to Gus Bell to put the Nationals ahead, 9–8. Red Schoendienst then reached on an error and Alvin Dark singled before Keegan was lifted. His replacement, left-hander Dean Stone, never threw an official pitch, but picked off Schoendienst as he attempted to steal home for the third out. Stone then became the winning pitcher when the American League rallied for three runs in the bottom of the eighth to claim an 11–9 triumph.

Despite his rough treatment in the midsummer classic, Keegan's 1954 season was his finest. He posted a 16–9 won–lost record with a 3.09 ERA in 2092/3 innings pitched. His 14 complete games that year was ninth in the league and a personal best.

=== 1957 no-hitter ===
On August 20, 1957, Keegan threw a no-hitter against the Washington Senators in the second game of a doubleheader at Comiskey Park. Keegan struck out one hitter and gave up two bases on balls in the contest, but otherwise was flawless on the mound. It was the majors' first no-hitter since Don Larsen's perfect game during the previous year's World Series.

1957 was Keegan's last full year in the majors. In the early weeks of 1958, he was sent to the minor leagues and joined his hometown Rochester Red Wings in 1959, winning 18 games. He pitched one more year with Rochester before retiring after 15 professional baseball seasons. In the majors, he went 40–36 lifetime, with 3.66 earned run average. In 135 career games, with 87 starts, he threw 29 complete games and six shutouts; he was credited with five saves as a reliever. In 6442/3 MLB innings pitched he allowed 668 hits and 233 bases on balls, with 198 strikeouts.

Achievements
Preceded by Don Larsen	No-hitter pitcher August 20, 1957	Succeeded by Jim Bunning
