= Divernon, Illinois =

Divernon
- Village
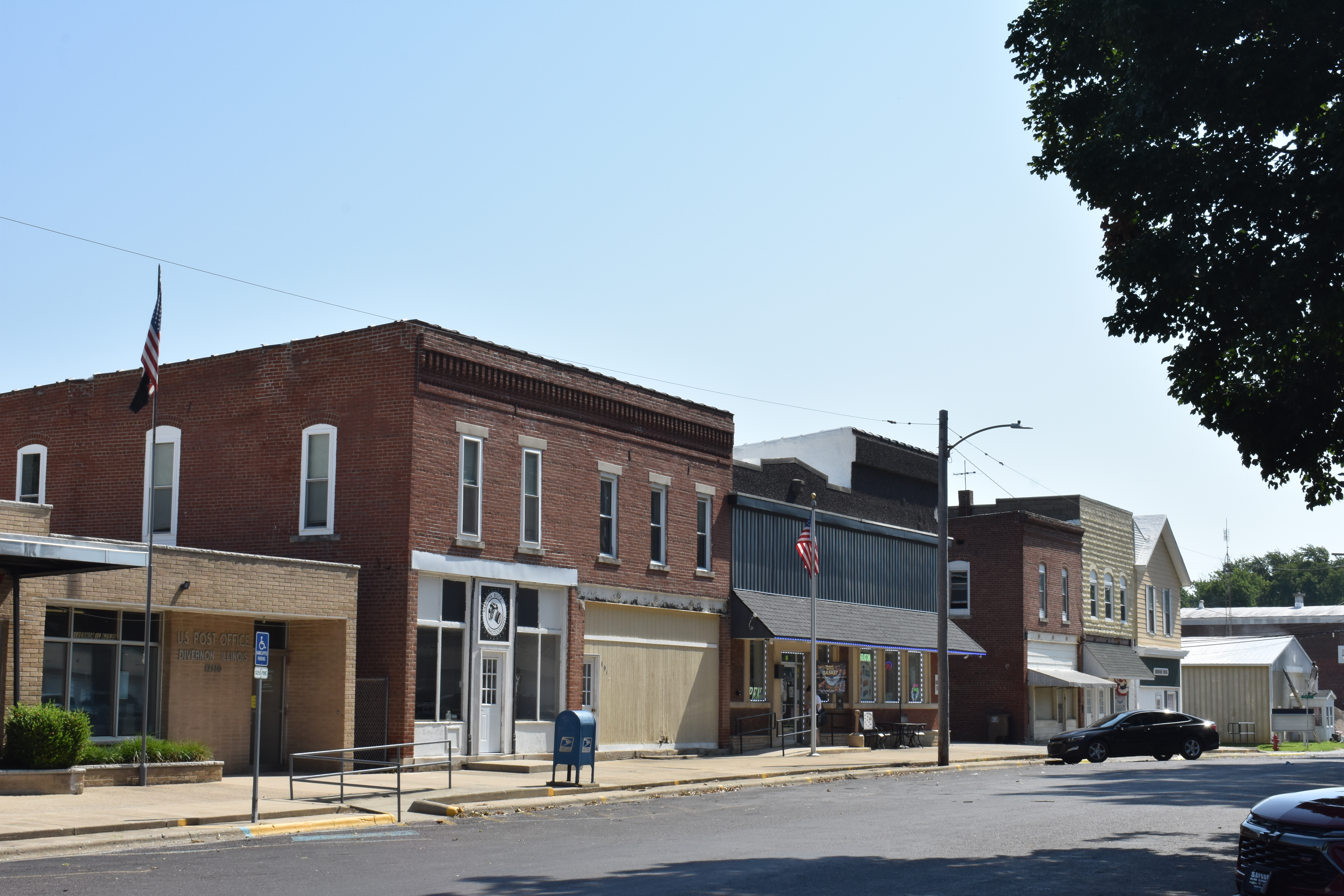
- Downtown Divernon

- Location of Divernon in Sangamon County, Illinois.
- Coordinates: 39°34′15″N 89°39′17″W
- Country: United States
- State: Illinois
- County: Sangamon

Area
  - Total: 0.76 sq mi (1.98 km^{2})
  - Land: 0.76 sq mi (1.98 km^{2})
  - Water: 0 sq mi (0.00 km^{2})
- Elevation: 607 ft (185 m)

Population (2020)
  - Total: 1,139
  - Density: 1,492.1/sq mi (576.11/km^{2})
- Time zone: UTC-6 (CST)
  - Summer (DST): UTC-5 (CDT)
- ZIP code: 62530
- Area code: 217
- FIPS code: 17-20045
- GNIS feature ID: 2398728
- Website: divernonil.com

Divernon is a village in Sangamon County, Illinois, United States. The population was 1,139 at the 2020 census. It is part of the Springfield, Illinois Metropolitan Statistical Area.

== History ==
A post office has been in operation at Divernon since 1887. The village took its name after Di Vernon, a character in the novel Rob Roy. A history of the village's first 75 years was compiled in 1975, titled "Village of Divernon Diamond Jubilee Memory Book."

== Geography ==
According to the 2010 census, the village has a total area of 0.79 square miles (2.0 km^{2}), all land.

== Demographics ==
Historical population
Census	Pop.	Note	%±
1910	1,519		—
1920	2,382		56.8%
1930	1,170		−50.9%
1940	1,033		−11.7%
1950	1,013		−1.9%
1960	997		−1.6%
1970	1,010		1.3%
1980	1,081		7.0%
1990	1,178		9.0%
2000	1,201		2.0%
2010	1,172		−2.4%
2020	1,139		−2.8%
U.S. Decennial Census

=== 2020 census ===
As of the 2020 census, there were 1,139 people, 498 households, and 327 families residing in the village. The population density was 1,507.3 inhabitants per square mile (582.0/km^{2}). There were 535 housing units at an average density of 647.6 per square mile (250.0/km^{2}).

The median age was 41.4 years. 22.2% of residents were under the age of 18, and 17.9% were age 65 or older. For every 100 females, there were 99.1 males, and for every 100 females age 18 and over, there were 96.9 males age 18 and over. Females made up 50.2% of the population.

Of all households, 31.1% had children under the age of 18 living in them. 45.8% were married-couple households, 20.7% were households with a male householder and no spouse or partner present, and 24.1% were households with a female householder and no spouse or partner present. 27.3% of all households were made up of individuals, and 10.2% had someone living alone who was 65 years of age or older. The average household size was 2.29 and the average family size was 3.48.

Of all housing units, 6.9% were vacant. The homeowner vacancy rate was 0.0% and the rental vacancy rate was 15.0%. 0.0% of residents lived in urban areas, while 100.0% lived in rural areas.

Racial composition as of the 2020 census
Race	Number	Percent
White	1,075	94.4%
Black or African American	5	0.4%
American Indian and Alaska Native	3	0.3%
Asian	2	0.2%
Native Hawaiian and Other Pacific Islander	0	0.0%
Some other race	6	0.5%
Two or more races	48	4.2%
Hispanic or Latino (of any race)	12	1.1%

=== Income and poverty ===
According to the 2023 American Community Survey, the median income for a household in the village was $72,936, and the median income for a family was $80,917. For non-family households, those with a female householder had a median income of $47,917, while those with a male householder had a medium income of $37,019. The per capita income for the village was $31,171. 3.8% of families and 12.0% of the population were below the poverty line, including 16.0% of those under age 18 and 1.9% of those age 65 or over.

== Education ==
Public schools are managed by Auburn Community Unit School District 10. Secondary education is provided by Auburn High School, located on North Seventh Street. The premises were previously occupied by Divernon High School.

== Notable people ==
- Joe Bukant, football player for the Philadelphia Eagles and Chicago Cardinals
- Al Papai, MLB pitcher for various teams
