= Jerry Schoonmaker =

American baseball player (1933–2018)

- Outfielder
- Born: December 14, 1933; Seymour, Missouri, U.S.
- Died: March 18, 2018 (aged 84); Dyer, Indiana, U.S.
- Batted: Right Threw: Right

MLB debut
- June 11, 1955, for the Washington Senators

Last MLB appearance
- September 29, 1957, for the Washington Senators

MLB statistics
- Batting average: .130
- Home runs: 1
- Runs batted in: 4
- Stats at Baseball Reference

Teams
- Washington Senators (1955, 1957)
Medals
Men's baseball
Representing United States
Pan American Games
Silver medal – second place	1955 Mexico City	Team

Jerald Lee Schoonmaker (December 14, 1933 – March 18, 2018) was an American professional baseball player. An outfielder, Schoonmaker was signed to a $30,000 bonus contract by the Washington Senators of Major League Baseball in 1955 after a standout career at the University of Missouri. However, his career was hampered by the Bonus Rule, which compelled him to spend his first two years as a professional on the Washington roster. Then, after his only minor league season, he sustained a career-ending eye injury in December 1958.

Schoonmaker threw and batted right-handed, stood 5 feet 11 inches (1.80 m) and weighed 190 pounds (86 kg). A three-sport (baseball, basketball and football) athlete in his hometown of Lebanon, Missouri, Schoonmaker batted close to .400 in his junior season at Missouri (when the Tigers won the NCAA Division I Baseball Championship) and captained the baseball team during his senior season. He won a silver medal with the United States team at the 1955 Pan American Games. After signing with Washington, he appeared in 20 games for the Senators in 1955, batting 46 times; then, after spending 1956 serving in the U.S. military, he spent his mandatory second year, 1957, on the Senator roster, playing in 30 contests but registering only 23 at-bats.

In 1958, Washington was finally permitted to send Schoonmaker to the minor leagues for much-needed experience, but he batted only .222 in 139 games, most of them with the Charlotte Hornets of the Class A Sally League. That offseason, he underwent surgery after an errant sliver of metal injured his left eye while he was working at a construction job. His vision compromised, he retired from professional baseball at the age of 25.

All told, Schoonmaker registered nine hits in 69 MLB at bats, including one double, triple and one home run. His homer was surrendered by Steve Gromek of the Detroit Tigers on July 23, 1955.

Schoonmaker died March 18, 2018.

== See also ==
- List of baseball players who went directly to Major League Baseball
