= Stan Jok =

American baseball player (1926–1972)

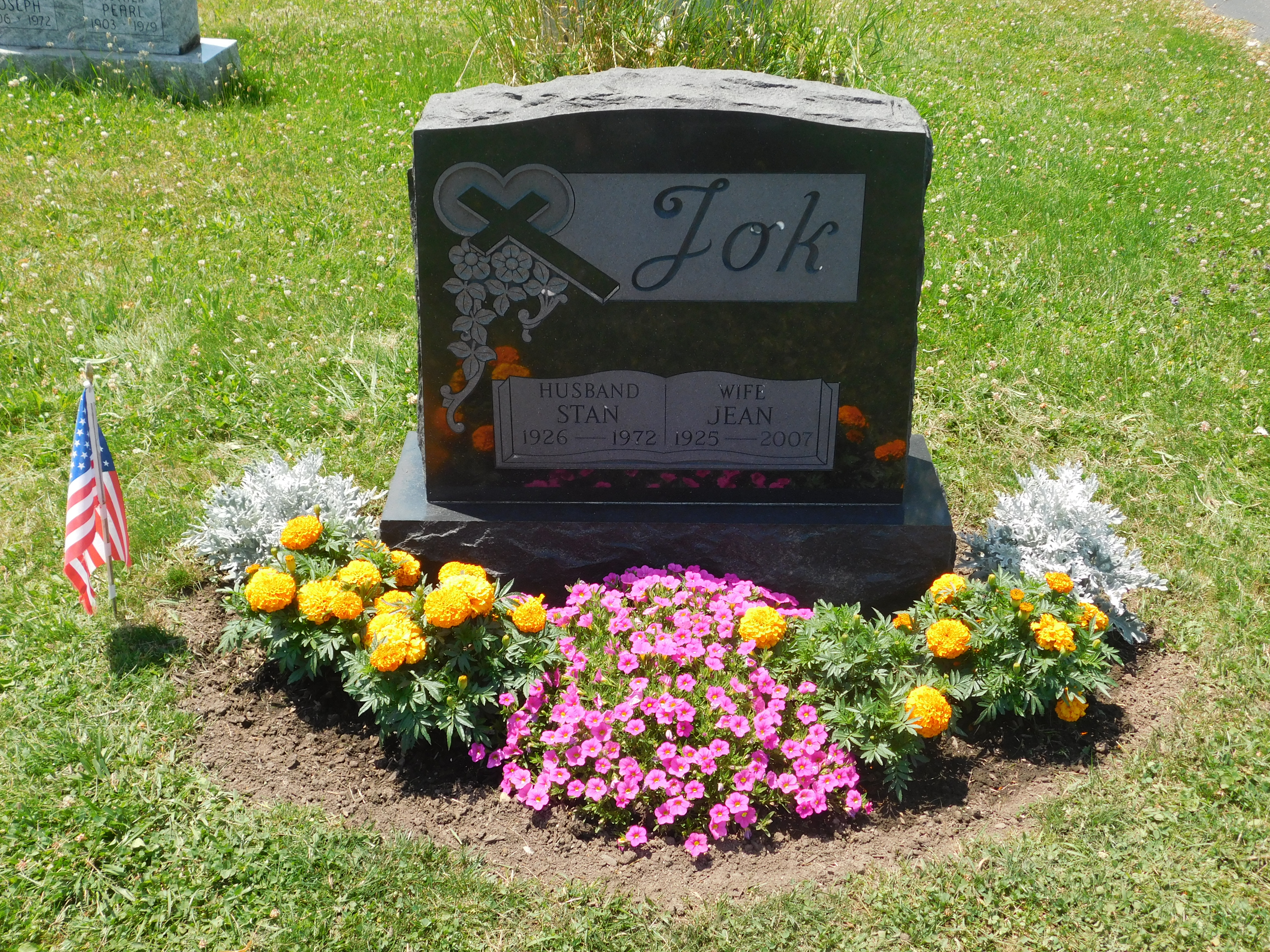
- The grave of Jok and his wife Jean at St. Stanislaus Cemetery in Cheektowaga, New York
- Third baseman
- Born: May 3, 1926; Buffalo, New York, U.S.
- Died: March 6, 1972 (aged 45); Buffalo, New York, U.S.
- Batted: Right Threw: Right

MLB debut
- April 13, 1954, for the Philadelphia Phillies

Last MLB appearance
- May 8, 1955, for the Chicago White Sox

MLB statistics
- Batting average: .158
- Home runs: 1
- Runs batted in: 4
- Stats at Baseball Reference

Teams
- Philadelphia Phillies (1954); Chicago White Sox (1954–1955)

Stanley Edward Jok (May 3, 1926 – March 6, 1972) was an American professional baseball player. A third baseman, Jok played all or parts of 14 seasons in minor league baseball, where he hit 192 home runs, but his Major League opportunity was limited to 12 total games played with the 1954 Philadelphia Phillies and the 1954–1955 Chicago White Sox. Born in Buffalo, New York, he threw and batted right-handed, stood 6 feet (1.8 m) tall and weighed 190 pounds (86 kg).

Jok had spent seven full seasons in the minors for three organizations before the Phillies gave him a chance at the outset of the 1954 season. He was used as a pinch hitter in three games, and went hitless. Placed on waivers, he was claimed by the White Sox, who assigned him to their Double-A affiliate, the Memphis Chickasaws, where Jok batted over .300. Recalled in September 1954, he started at three games for the ChiSox. In the first of those games, he registered his first MLB hit, an RBI single off Art Houtteman, and later drew a bases-loaded walk for another RBI. But he collected only one more hit in eight at bats in his next two starts.

Jok made the 1955 White Sox roster coming out of spring training and appeared in six more games, largely as a pinch hitter and pinch runner. But in his only start at third base, on May 1 at Comiskey Park against the Baltimore Orioles, Jok connected for his only Major League home run, a solo shot off Jim McDonald. He returned to minor league baseball for good at the mid-May cutdown. As a Major Leaguer, Jok had 22 plate appearances and 19 at-bats; of his three hits, only his homer went for extra bases.

Jok was a fixture in the Triple-A International League, where he appeared in 1,149 games for seven teams representing five different cities between 1950 and 1961, Jok's final pro season.
