= Randy Jackson (baseball) =

American baseball player (1926–2019)

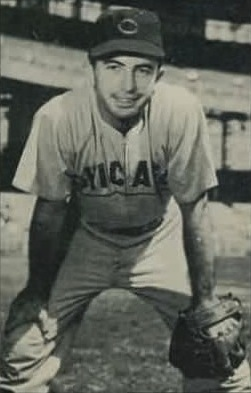
- Jackson in 1953
- Third baseman
- Born: February 10, 1926; Little Rock, Arkansas, U.S.
- Died: March 20, 2019 (aged 93); Athens, Georgia, U.S.
- Batted: Right Threw: Right

MLB debut
- May 2, 1950, for the Chicago Cubs

Last MLB appearance
- September 25, 1959, for the Chicago Cubs

MLB statistics
- Batting average: .261
- Home runs: 103
- Runs batted in: 415
- Stats at Baseball Reference

Teams
- Chicago Cubs (1950–1955); Brooklyn / Los Angeles Dodgers (1956–1958); Cleveland Indians (1958–1959); Chicago Cubs (1959)

Career highlights and awards
- 2× All-Star (1954, 1955)

Ransom Joseph "Randy" Jackson (February 10, 1926 – March 20, 2019) was an American Major League Baseball (MLB) player for the Chicago Cubs (1950–1955, 1959), Dodgers (1956–1958; two seasons in Brooklyn, one in Los Angeles), and Cleveland Indians (1958–1959). A book on Jackson’s career, Handsome Ransom Jackson: Accidental Big Leaguer, was published in 2016. He died at his home on March 20, 2019.

== Before Major League Baseball ==
After a year at the University of Arkansas, he transferred twice, and helped lead the football teams of Texas Christian University (1945) and the University of Texas at Austin (1946) to consecutive Cotton Bowl Classic appearances as a halfback. Playing baseball in college he hit .500, .438 and .400.

== MLB career ==
The Chicago Cubs signed him in 1947. On 2 May 1950, the 24-year-old made his major-league debut. "Handsome Ransom" had four solid seasons at third base for the Cubs from 1951 to 1955.

Jackson followed up a slow rookie season (in which he had 111 at-bats over 34 games) with a solid second season, in which he hit .276 with 76 RBI and 16 home runs. He struggled again in his third major-league season, his average falling to .232, with 34 RBI and 9 home runs.

Jackson rebounded over the next three seasons, posting batting averages of .285 (1953), .273 (1954), and .265 (1955). His RBI (66, 67, and 70) and home run (19, 19, and 21) totals also rebounded. Nor did his defensive play lag behind: in 1955, Jackson led the National League (NL) in double plays.

His hitting and excellent play at third earned him consecutive trips to the All-Star Game in his last two seasons in Chicago. In the 1954 game he came off the bench behind starter Ray Jablonski of the St. Louis Cardinals, in an 11–9 loss to the American League (AL). The next season, 1955, he again came off the bench, in a 6–5 win for the National League, behind the Milwaukee Braves' Eddie Mathews.

On the strength of Jackson's five continuous seasons in Chicago, the Dodgers, looking for a replacement for their aging All-Star third baseman Jackie Robinson, traded Don Hoak, Russ Meyer and Walt Moryn to the Cubs for Jackson and Don Elston.

Jackson played off the bench behind Robinson in 1956. Despite having over 200 fewer plate appearances than in his previous year, he managed a .274 average with 8 home runs and 53 RBI. The Dodgers played in the famed "subway Series" against their hated cross-town rivals, the New York Yankees in the 1956 World Series, but Jackson had only three pinch-hit at-bats, going 0-for-3, with two strike-outs.

The following season (1957), Jackson suffered a major knee injury, ending his chances to become a star for the Dodgers. He played off the bench, not appearing in more than 64 games in a season for the rest of his career. He totaled only eight more home runs and 43 RBIs combined for the next three seasons.

== Notable games ==
- 28 June 1951: Hits a home run in the seventh inning to help the Cubs Frank Hiller to a "one-hitter", winning 8–0 over the St. Louis Cardinals, facing just 27 batters.
- 15 August 1953: Tied a NL record by grounding into three double-plays against the Milwaukee Braves in a 2–0 loss (Joe Torre would later break the record).
- 17 April 1954: With the wind at his back, he had four hits, including a home run which hit an apartment building on Waveland Avenue, across from Wrigley Field, in a NL record three-hour and 43-minute game against the St. Louis Cardinals. The Cubs won the game 23–13, the highest scoring game ever between these two rivals, and the two teams combine for 35 hits, including five homers and a 10-run Chicago 5th inning, with Jim Brosnan the winning pitcher over Gerry Staley.
- 28 September 1957: Hit the final home run in Brooklyn Dodgers history before the team moved to Los Angeles for the 1958 season in an 8-4 victory over the Phillies.
- Another unusual game occurred on June 29, 1956, where he was playing for the Brooklyn Dodgers against the Philadelphia Phillies, who were leading 5-2 going into the bottom of the ninth inning. Pee Wee Reese was on second base when Duke Snider preceded Jackson with a home run which brought the game to 5-4. Jackson then hit a home run to tie the game, and on the next pitch Gil Hodges hit another home run to win the game for the Dodgers, being the only time in Major League Baseball history where a baseball game ended with three consecutive home runs.

== Transactions ==
- 9 December 1955: Traded to the Dodgers for Don Hoak (3B) and Walt Moryn (OF).
  At the same time the Dodgers traded Russ Meyer (P) to the Cubs for Don Elston (P-RH) and cash.
- 4 August 1958: Purchased by the Cleveland Indians from the Los Angeles Dodgers
- 4 May 1959: Traded for Bob Smith (P-LH) from Cleveland to the Chicago Cubs
- 8 October 1959: Released by the Chicago Cubs

== Sources ==
- Randy Jackson bio @ WhenitwasaGame.net
- Stats @ Baseball-Almanac.com
- Career statistics from Baseball Reference · Baseball Reference (Minors) · Retrosheet · Baseball Almanac
