= Gordie Mueller =

American baseball player (1922–2006)

- Pitcher
- Born: December 10, 1922; Baltimore, Maryland, U.S.
- Died: September 7, 2006 (aged 83); Timonium, Maryland, U.S.
- Batted: Right Threw: Right

MLB debut
- April 19, 1950, for the Boston Red Sox

Last MLB appearance
- July 21, 1950, for the Boston Red Sox

MLB statistics
- Win–loss record: 0–0
- Earned run average: 10.29
- Innings pitched: 7
- Stats at Baseball Reference

Teams
- Boston Red Sox (1950)

Joseph Gordon Mueller (December 10, 1922 – September 7, 2006) was an American relief pitcher in Major League Baseball who played briefly for the Boston Red Sox during the 1950 season. Listed at 6 feet 4 inches (1.93 m) and 200 pounds (91 kg), Mueller batted and threw right-handed. He was born in Baltimore, attended Loyola College in Maryland, and served in the United States Navy during World War II.

Mueller's ten-year pro career began in 1941 with his hometown Orioles, then a minor league baseball franchise in the International League. He made his major-league debut nine years later as a member of the Red Sox' early season roster. In eight relief appearances, three in April and July and two in May, Mueller allowed eight runs and 11 hits, giving 13 base on balls and registering one strikeout in seven full innings pitched for a 10.29 ERA. He did not have a decision or a save. He also spent part of that year at Triple-A Louisville, then finished his pro career in 1952. After baseball, he had a long and successful career in commercial real estate in his native state.

Mueller died at the age of 83 in Timonium, Maryland where he lived.

== See also ==
- 1950 Boston Red Sox season
- Boston Red Sox all-time roster
