= 1954 Major League Baseball All-Star Game =

1954 American baseball competition

	1	2	3	4	5	6	7	8	9	R	H	E
National League	0	0	0	5	2	0	0	2	0	9	14	0
American League	0	0	4	1	2	1	0	3	x	11	17	1
- Date: July 13, 1954
- Venue: Cleveland Municipal Stadium
- City: Cleveland, Ohio
- Managers: Walter Alston (Brooklyn Dodgers); Casey Stengel (New York Yankees)
- Attendance: 69,751 – Time of Game: 3:10
- Television: NBC
- TV announcers: Mel Allen and Gene Kelly
- Radio: Mutual
- Radio announcers: Al Helfer and Jimmy Dudley

The 1954 Major League Baseball All-Star Game was the 21st playing of the midsummer classic between the all-stars of the American League (AL) and National League (NL), the two leagues comprising Major League Baseball. The game was held on July 13, 1954, at Cleveland Municipal Stadium in Cleveland, Ohio, the home of the Cleveland Indians of the American League.

== Summary ==
The American League rallied in the bottom of the eighth inning, to defeat the National League in an 11–9 slugfest at Cleveland Stadium. Both teams combined for an All-Star Game record 20 runs, on 31 hits, which included six home runs. Al Rosen led the American League offense, going 3-for-4 with two home runs and five runs batted in.

Starters Whitey Ford (AL) and Robin Roberts (NL) matched zeroes until the third inning, when the American League hitters stacked themselves to an early 4–0 lead in the bottom of the inning. Minnie Miñoso opened the frame with a single and Nellie Fox walked, while Roberts struck out Mickey Mantle and retired Yogi Berra on a grounder, but could not overcome a three-run homer by Rosen to make it a 3–0 game. Ray Boone followed with a homer before Roberts retired Hank Bauer.

Opening the fourth inning, the National League rallied for five runs to take a 5–4 lead. Sandy Consuegra retired the first batter he faced, but Duke Snider, Ted Kluszewski and Ray Jablonski hit consecutive singles and Jackie Robinson a double, tying the game at four. Bob Lemon relieved Consuegra, but gave up a two-out, RBI-double by the pinch-hitter Don Mueller before retiring Granny Hamner for the third out.

Meanwhile, Chico Carrasquel kept the American League attack alive with a lead-off single in the bottom of the fourth against Johnny Antonelli. Carrasquel moved to third on a one-out single by Miñoso and scored on a sacrifice fly by Beto Ávila, tying the score at five.

The National League picked up two more two-out runs off Bob Porterfield in the fifth to pull back in front, 7–5, after a single by Snider and a two-run homer by Kluszewski. In the bottom of the inning, Berra hit a single off Antonelli and Rosen belted his second home run of the game to tie the score at seven.

The American League regained the lead in the sixth, 8–7, with an RBI-single by Avila off Warren Spahn that brought home Williams.

In the eighth inning, the National League bats stayed hot against Bob Keegan. Willie Mays singled and Gus Bell unloaded it with a pinch-hit, two-run homer to put again away the game, 9–8. Dean Stone came in relief with two outs and Red Schoendienst running on third. Schoendienst attempted to steal home and was thrown out by Stone. This third out set the stage for Larry Doby, who pinch hit for Stone with one out in the bottom of the inning and tied the game with a home run against Gene Conley, becoming the first black player to hit a home run in an All-Star Game. After that, Mantle and Berra singled and Rosen walked to load the bases. Carl Erskine replaced Conley and retired Mickey Vernon for the second out, but gave up a two-RBI single to Fox that sealed the 11–9 victory for the American League.

The American League (7) and the National League (6) used 13 pitchers in the game. Stone took the win (without retiring a batter) and Conley was tagged with the loss while Virgil Trucks earned the save. Trucks walked Snider to open the ninth inning, but retired Stan Musial, Gil Hodges and Randy Jackson for the last three outs of the game.

The win broke a four-game All-Star losing streak for the American League, dating back to 1950. After this game, the AL led the all-time All-Star Series 13–8.

This marked the first of two times the Indians hosted an All-Star Game and played in the World Series in the same season. By the time it happened again, in 1997, they had moved to what is now Progressive Field. That game also ended a losing streak for the American League.

== Notes ==
- The 20 runs scored in the contest set an All-Star Game record which lasted until 1998, when the American League defeated the National League, 13–8, at Coors Field.
- Al Rosen became the third player to hit two home runs in an All-Star Game. Arky Vaughan did it in 1941, and Ted Williams did it in 1946. This feat would be matched later by Willie McCovey in 1969 and Gary Carter in 1981.
- This was only the second Midsummer Classic to date with more than sixty-thousand fans in attendance (69,751). The first occurred during the 1935 All-Star Game, which was also held at Cleveland Municipal Stadium (69,812).
- This is the only All-Star Game to date in which one of the managers—in this case Walter Alston—was in his first year of managing the defending league champions he represented. Alston was managing in place of his predecessor as manager of the Brooklyn Dodgers, Charlie Dressen.

== Opening lineups ==
National League			American League
Player	Team	Pos	Player	Team	Pos
Granny Hamner	Philadelphia Phillies	2B	Minnie Miñoso	Chicago White Sox	LF
Alvin Dark	New York Giants	SS	Bobby Ávila	Cleveland Indians	2B
Duke Snider	Brooklyn Dodgers	CF	Mickey Mantle	New York Yankees	CF
Stan Musial	St. Louis Cardinals	RF	Yogi Berra	New York Yankees	C
Ted Kluszewski	Cincinnati Redlegs	1B	Al Rosen	Cleveland Indians	1B
Ray Jablonski	St. Louis Cardinals	3B	Ray Boone	Detroit Tigers	3B
Jackie Robinson	Brooklyn Dodgers	LF	Hank Bauer	New York Yankees	RF
Roy Campanella	Brooklyn Dodgers	C	Chico Carrasquel	Chicago White Sox	SS
Robin Roberts	Philadelphia Phillies	P	Whitey Ford	New York Yankees	P

== Rosters ==
Players in italics have since been inducted into the National Baseball Hall of Fame.

1954 National League All-Star Game roster
Pitchers: 43 (United States) Johnny Antonelli; 22 (United States) Gene Conley; 17 (United States) Carl Erskine; 42 (United States) Marv Grissom; 42 (United States) Harvey Haddix *; 36 (United States) Robin Roberts; 21 (United States) Warren Spahn; 19 (United States) Jim Wilson; Catchers: 21 (United States) Smoky Burgess; 39 (United States) Roy Campanella; 1 (United States) Del Crandall *	Infielders: 19 (United States) Alvin Dark; 2 (United States) Granny Hamner; 14 (United States) Gil Hodges; 11 (United States) Ray Jablonski; 2 (United States) Randy Jackson; 18 (United States) Ted Kluszewski; 1 (United States) Pee Wee Reese *; 2 (United States) Red Schoendienst; Outfielders: 25 (United States) Gus Bell; 24 (United States) Willie Mays; 22 (United States) Don Mueller; 6 (United States) Stan Musial; 42 (United States) Jackie Robinson; 4 (United States) Duke Snider; 15 (United States) Frank Thomas	Manager: 24 (United States) Walter Alston; Coaches: 2 (United States) Leo Durocher; 40 (United States) Charlie Grimm; * = Did not play

1954 American League All-Star Game roster
Pitchers: 20 (Cuba) Sandy Consuegra; 16 (United States) Whitey Ford; 25 (United States) Mike Garcia *; 15 (United States) Bob Keegan; 21 (United States) Bob Lemon; 19 (United States) Bob Porterfield; 22 (United States) Allie Reynolds *; 26 (United States) Dean Stone; 33 (United States) Bob Turley *; 23 (United States) Virgil Trucks; Catchers: 8 (United States) Yogi Berra; 10 (United States) Sherm Lollar *	Infielders: 1 (Mexico) Bobby Ávila; 8 (United States) Ray Boone; 17 (Venezuela) Chico Carrasquel; 8 (United States) Ferris Fain *; 15 (United States) Jim Finigan *; 2 (United States) Nellie Fox; 1 (United States) George Kell *; 26 (United States) Harvey Kuenn *; 7 (United States) Al Rosen; 3 (United States) Mickey Vernon; Outfielders: 9 (United States) Hank Bauer; 14 (United States) Larry Doby; 7 (United States) Mickey Mantle; 9 (Cuba) Minnie Miñoso; 25 (United States) Irv Noren; 37 (United States) Jim Piersall; 9 (United States) Ted Williams	Manager: 37 (United States) Casey Stengel; Coaches: 29 (United States) Fred Hutchinson; 28 (United States) Marty Marion; * = Did not play

== Umpires ==
Position	Umpire
Home Plate	Eddie Rommel (AL)
First Base	Lee Ballanfant (NL)
Second Base	Jim Honochick (AL)
Third Base	Bill Stewart (NL)
Left Field	Joe Paparella (AL)
Right Field	Tom Gorman (NL)

== Line score ==
Tuesday, July 13, 1954 1:30 pm (ET) at Cleveland Stadium in Cleveland, Ohio
Team	1	2	3	4	5	6	7	8	9	R	H	E
National League	0	0	0	5	2	0	0	2	0	9	14	0
American League	0	0	4	1	2	1	0	3	X	11	17	1
WP: Stone LP: Conley Sv: Trucks; Home runs: NL: Kluszewski, Bell; AL: Rosen 2, Boone, Doby

How the runs scored
Team	Inning	Play	NL	AL
AL	3rd	Rosen homered, Miñoso and Avila scored Boone homered	0	4
NL	4th	Kluszewski singled, Snider scored, Musial to third Jablonski singled, Musial scored, Kluszewski to second Robinson doubled, Kluszewski and Jablonski scored Mueller doubled, Robinson scored	5	4
AL	4th	Avila sacrifice fly to left, Carrasquel scored	5	5
NL	5th	Kluszewski homered, Snider scored	7	5
AL	5th	Rosen homered, Berra scored	7	7
AL	6th	Avila singled, Williams scored	7	8
NL	8th	Bell homered, Mays scored	9	8
AL	8th	Doby homered Fox singled, Mantle and Berra scored	9	11

Play-by-play at Retrosheet
