= Ray Jablonski =

American baseball player (1926–1985)

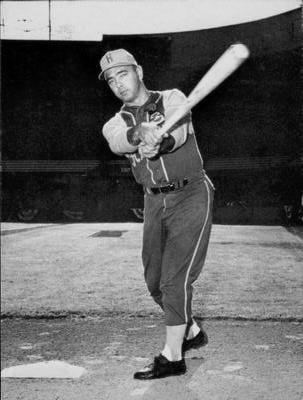
- Jablonski in 1961
- Third baseman
- Born: December 17, 1926; Chicago, Illinois, U.S.
- Died: November 25, 1985 (aged 58); Chicago, Illinois, U.S.
- Batted: Right Threw: Right

MLB debut
- April 14, 1953, for the St. Louis Cardinals

Last MLB appearance
- September 17, 1960, for the Kansas City Athletics

MLB statistics
- Batting average: .268
- Home runs: 83
- Runs batted in: 438
- Stats at Baseball Reference

Teams
- St. Louis Cardinals (1953–1954); Cincinnati Redlegs (1955–1956); New York / San Francisco Giants (1957–1958); St. Louis Cardinals (1959); Kansas City Athletics (1959–1960)

Career highlights and awards
- All-Star (1954)

Raymond Leo Jablonski (December 17, 1926 – November 25, 1985) was an American professional baseball third baseman. He played in Major League Baseball (MLB) for all or parts of eight MLB seasons between 1953 and 1960. A 1954 National League All-Star, Jablonski appeared in 812 games for the St. Louis Cardinals, Cincinnati Redlegs, New York / San Francisco Giants and Kansas City Athletics. The native of Chicago, Illinois, threw and batted right-handed and was listed as 5 feet 10 inches (1.78 m) tall and 175 pounds (79 kg).

== Baseball career ==
Jablonski's pro career began in the Boston Red Sox organization in 1947. After two seasons at the Class D level, the Cardinals acquired him in the 1948 minor league draft. In 1951, he was the Most Valuable Player of the Class B Carolina League after he won the league's Triple Crown. Then, after one season in Triple-A, Jablonski broke into the 1953 Cardinals' starting lineup. He started all 157 games for the Redbirds at third base, and set career bests in home runs (21) and runs batted in (112), finishing third in the National League's Rookie of the Year Award balloting (behind Jim Gilliam and teammate Harvey Haddix). In 1954, he drove in over 100 runs for a second straight season and batted a career-high .296. Selected to the 1954 Major League Baseball All-Star Game, he started at third base for the National League and contributed a fourth-inning single off Sandy Consuegra to help the Senior Circuit overcome a four-run deficit and take a 5–4 lead. But the rival American League ended up winning the slugfest, 11–9, at Cleveland Stadium.

His 1953–54 seasons constituted the high-water marks of his big league career. Although he led NL third-basemen in assists in 1954, Jablonski committed 27 and 34 errors in successive seasons, and with hard-hitting and slick-fielding Ken Boyer poised to break onto the varsity roster, the Cardinals traded Jablonski to the Redlegs along with pitcher Gerry Staley for Cincinnati relief ace Frank Smith after the 1954 campaign. Then Jablonski suffered through two sub-par seasons in Cincinnati, batting only .240 and .256 and spending part of 1955 back in the minor leagues. The Reds traded him to the Chicago Cubs after 1956, but Jablonski would never appear in a regular-season game for his hometown team. Chicago sent him to the New York Giants on the opening day of the 1957 season. Jablonski was the Giants' regular third baseman during their final New York season and batted .289, but the following year he lost the starting job to rookie Jim Davenport and hit only .230 in part-time duty.

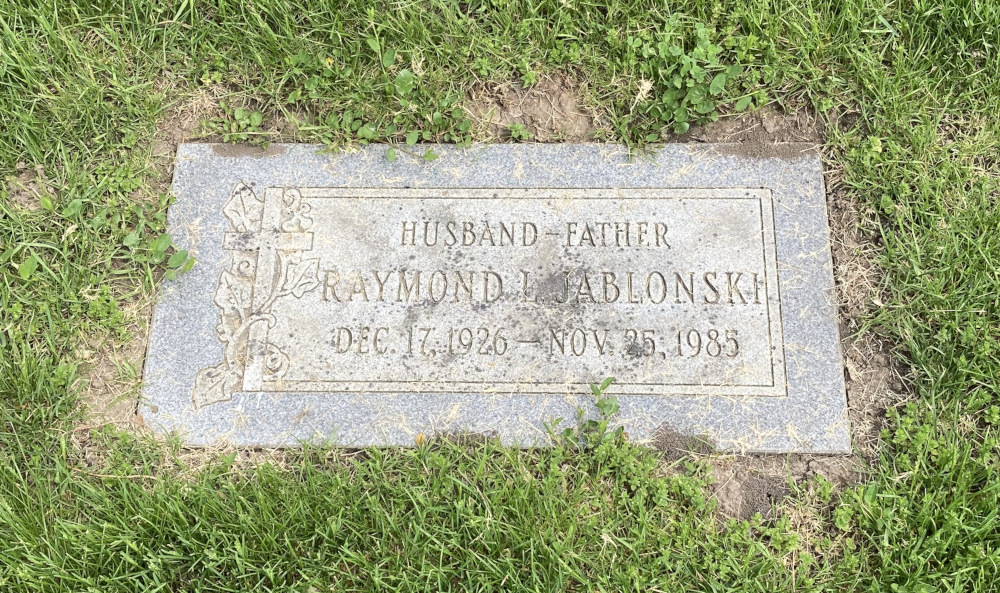
Jablonski's grave at Resurrection Catholic Cemetery

Sent back to the Cardinals just prior to opening day in 1959, Jablonski backed up Boyer and served as a pinch hitter through August 20, before being claimed off waivers by the Kansas City Athletics. After he closed the 1959 campaign with Kansas City, the A's demoted him to the Triple-A Dallas-Fort Worth Rangers for most of 1960 before giving him one last MLB trial in the closing weeks of the season. In his final big-league game on September 17, he pinch hit against Jack Harshman of the Cleveland Indians and flied out. All told, Jablonski had 687 hits as a big-leaguer, with 126 doubles, 11 triples and 83 home runs, batting .268 with 438 runs batted in.

His professional career continued through 1964 at the Triple-A level. Ray Jablonski died at age 58 in Chicago. He was buried at Resurrection Catholic Cemetery in Justice, Illinois.
