= Divernon High School =

Location
- 303 East Kenney Street; Divernon, Illinois 62530; United States
- Coordinates: 39°33′54″N 89°39′10″W

Information
- Opened: approx 1900
- Closed: June 2007
- School district: Divernon Community Unit School District 13
- Colors: Blue and Gold
- Mascot: Dragon

Divernon High School was a public, community high school in Divernon, Illinois, United States. It was managed by the Divernon Community Unit School District 13.

== History ==
The precise opening date is not known but the first student graduated in 1904. The main building was constructed in 1912. The Principal, for the last seven years of the school's independent existence, was Ron Ervin.

In its later years, the viability of the district progressively became doubtful due to declining rolls and an inability to offer a full range of classes. The Diveron district was annexed by the Auburn Community Unit School District 10 in 2007. As part of this reorganisation Divernon High was merged into Auburn High School. The former Divernon High premises are now occupied by Auburn Junior High School.

Joseph Hartman, Ernest Hartman, and Mary Ann Hartman, all of Divernon, completed 12 years of school with no tardies and no absences. Joseph graduated in 1935, Ernest graduated in 1938, and Mary Ann graduated in 1939. Their younger sister Theresa Hartman completed 12 years of school with no tardies, and she only missed a half day of school when her sister Mary Ann died. Theresa graduated as Valedictorian in 1942.

== Athletics ==
The athletics teams were known as the Divernon Dragons and the Divernon Lady Dragons. Sports played included, for boys, baseball, basketball, football and track and for girls, softball, volleyball basketball and track.
