= Bill Abernathie =

American baseball player (1929–2006)

- Pitcher
- Born: January 30, 1929; Torrance, California, U.S.
- Died: February 19, 2006 (aged 77); Yucaipa, California, U.S.
- Batted: Right Threw: Right

MLB debut
- September 27, 1952, for the Cleveland Indians

Last MLB appearance
- September 27, 1952, for the Cleveland Indians

MLB statistics
- Win–loss record: 0–0
- Earned run average: 13.50
- Saves: 1
- Stats at Baseball Reference

Teams
- Cleveland Indians (1952)

William Edward Abernathie (January 30, 1929 – February 19, 2006) was an American professional baseball pitcher in the late 1940s and early 1950s.

Abernathie played high school baseball at Colton High School in Colton, California, and after graduating was signed by the Cleveland Indians in 1948. He began his professional career that year with the Tucson Cowboys of the Arizona–Texas League. In 35 games, he had a 17–14 win-loss record and a 4.63 earned run average (ERA) in 239 innings pitched. In 1949, he spent the year with Tucson, and had a 19–8 record, a 5.04 ERA and 252 innings pitched in 37 games. The following year, he was promoted to the Dayton Indians, and had a 13–8 record and a 3.54 ERA in 30 games.

In 1951, Abernathie spent the year with the Dallas Eagles, and had a 16–16 record and a 2.84 ERA in 37 games. After the season, the Indians purchased his contract and planned to have him compete for a roster spot in spring training. He did not win a roster spot during the spring, and spent 1952 with the Indianapolis Indians, and had an 11–9 record in 34 games for the team. After the season ended, he was promoted to the Indians roster. His only appearance came on September 28 in relief of Bob Chakales. He pitched the final two innings and allowed three runs, but got the save as the Indians won, 11–6. Abernathie spent the following year with Indianapolis, and had a 4–9 record in 15 games. At the end of the 1953 season, Abernathie was traded to the Brooklyn Dodgers with cash for Rocky Nelson.

After playing in one game for the Montreal Royals in 1954, Abernathie joined the United States Marine Corps, and served until mid-1956 when he went back to playing baseball and joined the San Francisco Seals. He had a 2.63 ERA for the Seals in 36 games in 1956, then had a 13–2 record and a 4.65 ERA the following year over 45 games. He then spent the 1958 season with the Memphis Chickasaws, the Houston Buffaloes, the Salt Lake City Bees, and the Minneapolis Millers, retiring at the end of the season. After retiring, Abernathie became a detective in San Bernardino, California.
