= Hersh Freeman =

American baseball player (1928–2004)

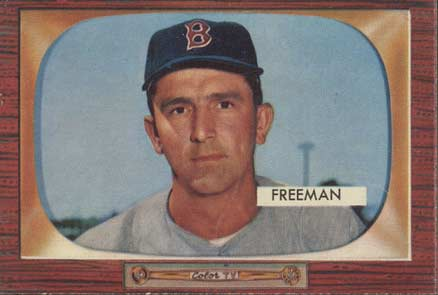
- Pitcher
- Born: July 1, 1928; Gadsden, Alabama, U.S.
- Died: January 17, 2004 (aged 75); Orlando, Florida, U.S.
- Batted: Right Threw: Right

MLB debut
- September 10, 1952, for the Boston Red Sox

Last MLB appearance
- June 7, 1958, for the Chicago Cubs

MLB statistics
- Win–loss record: 30–16
- Earned run average: 3.74
- Innings pitched: 359
- Stats at Baseball Reference

Teams
- Boston Red Sox (1952–1953, 1955); Cincinnati Redlegs (1955–1958); Chicago Cubs (1958)

Hershell Baskin Freeman (July 1, 1928 – January 17, 2004) was an American professional baseball player, a pitcher who appeared in 204 games, all but three in relief, in the Major Leagues over six seasons (1952–53; 1955–58) for the Boston Red Sox, Cincinnati Redlegs and Chicago Cubs. He later became a minor league manager.

Born in Gadsden, Alabama, Freeman threw and batted right-handed; he stood 6 feet 3 inches (1.91 m) tall and weighed 220 pounds (100 kg). After attending the University of Alabama, Freeman signed with the Red Sox in 1948, and spent five seasons in their farm system before his recall in September 1952. Even though he had pitched exclusively in relief for the Triple-A Louisville Colonels, Freeman was given a starting assignment in his fourth MLB appearance on September 26, 1952. Facing the Washington Senators at Fenway Park, Freeman hurled a complete game, 3–1 victory, allowing only four Washington hits. It was Freeman's only complete game in the Majors.

He failed to stick with the Red Sox, however, spending most of 1953 and all of 1954 with Louisville. After only two appearances in relief for the 1955 Red Sox, he was placed on waivers at the May cutdown and claimed by the Redlegs. When Cincinnati manager Birdie Tebbetts asked Freeman why the Red Sox waived him, Freeman said Boston had not given him the pitching workload he needed to be effective. "Brother", Tebbetts replied, "you came to the right place."

Tebbetts then used Freeman in relief for 54, 64 and 52 games during the seasons of 1955 through 1957, and Freeman responded by compiling a won–lost record of 28–11 with the Redlegs, with 37 saves and an earned run average of 3.33. In 1956, he was second in the National League in games pitched, and led the NL in games finished, as Cincinnati finished third in the standings, only two games behind the pennant-winning Brooklyn Dodgers. Freeman finished 13th in the balloting for NL Most Valuable Player that season. In 1957 he allowed 14 home runs in 83 2/3 innings pitched and saw his ERA jump to 4.52. In early 1958, he was swapped to the Cubs for a fellow reliever, Turk Lown, and made only nine appearances with Chicago before being sent to the minor leagues in June.

All told, Freeman worked in 359 innings in the Majors, allowing 387 hits and 109 bases on balls. He struck out 158; his 37 career saves all came as a member of the Redlegs. He also handled 82 total chances (19 putouts, 63 assists) without an error for a perfect 1.000 fielding percentage.

Freeman stayed in baseball as a Cincinnati scout in 1960 and from 1961 to 1963 he managed in the mid- to lower-level minor leagues in the Reds' farm system.
