= Leo Cristante =

American baseball player (1926–1977)

- Pitcher
- Born: December 10, 1926; Detroit, Michigan, U.S.
- Died: August 24, 1977 (aged 50); Dearborn, Michigan, U.S.
- Batted: Right Threw: Right

MLB debut
- April 21, 1951, for the Philadelphia Phillies

Last MLB appearance
- September 7, 1955, for the Detroit Tigers

MLB statistics
- Win–loss record: 1–2
- Earned run average: 3.84
- Strikeouts: 15
- Stats at Baseball Reference

Teams
- Philadelphia Phillies (1951); Detroit Tigers (1955)

Dante Leo Cristante (December 10, 1926 – August 24, 1977) was an American professional baseball right-handed pitcher. He had a 13-year (1947–59) career in pro ball, including 30 games played in Major League Baseball (MLB) for the 1951 Philadelphia Phillies and 1955 Detroit Tigers (his hometown team). During Cristante's playing days, he was listed as 6 feet 1 inch (1.85 m) tall, weighing 195 pounds (88 kg).

Cristante spent the early months of the 1951 season as a member of the Phillies' pitching staff, appearing in ten games, nine in relief. He earned his only Major League victory on April 29 against the Boston Braves. Cristante was called into the game in the first inning at Braves Field in relief of Bob Miller with Boston in the midst of a six-run rally; Cristante allowed only two earned runs over the next 5 2/3 innings as the Phillies came from behind to win, 10–9. Three weeks later, Cristante made his only National League (NL) start, on May 18 against the Chicago Cubs at Wrigley Field. This time, he was routed in the first inning, failing to record an out. However, the Phillies could not recover and the 18–9 defeat was charged to Cristante.

Cristante spent the next 3 1/2 years in the minors. In 1954, he led the Double-A Southern Association in wins (24) and winning percentage (.774), and was named to the all-star team. The performance brought Cristante back to MLB for 1955 with his hometown Tigers, who acquired him in a trade with the Chicago White Sox. Cristante appeared in 20 games for the 1955 Tigers, coming out of the bullpen for all but one appearance. In his lone start, July 27 against the Baltimore Orioles at Memorial Stadium, he lasted into the fifth inning and did not earn a decision in an 8–7 Tiger loss. As a Major Leaguer, Cristante allowed 65 hits and 23 bases on balls in 58 2/3 innings, with 15 strikeouts.

Cristante returned to the minor leagues in 1956 and spent the remainder of his career in the high minors in the Brooklyn/Los Angeles Dodgers' organization. He retired after appearing in 383 minor league games, with a 111–92 record.
