= Ernie Oravetz =

American baseball player (1932-2006)

- Outfielder
- Born: January 24, 1932; Johnstown, Pennsylvania, U.S.
- Died: December 3, 2006 (aged 74); Tampa, Florida, U.S.
- Batted: Switch Threw: Left

MLB debut
- April 11, 1955, for the Washington Senators

Last MLB appearance
- September 30, 1956, for the Washington Senators

MLB statistics
- Batting average: .263
- Hits: 105
- Home runs: 0
- Runs batted in: 36
- Stats at Baseball Reference

Teams
- Washington Senators (1955–1956)

Ernest Eugene Oravetz (January 24, 1932 – December 3, 2006) was an American professional baseball player. A switch-hitting outfielder who threw left-handed, he played two seasons of Major League Baseball with the 1955–1956 Washington Senators. He was born in Johnstown, Pennsylvania.

Oravetz stood only 5 feet 4 inches (1.63 m) tall and weighed 145 pounds (66 kg). He never hit more than two home runs in any professional season, but he batted .311 during his minor league career and in 1951, his first year as a pro, he led the Class D Florida State League in batting (.362) and runs scored (122) and was named to the All-Star team.

He collected 105 hits, with eight doubles and three triples, in 188 games played with Washington over two full seasons. He was sent to the minor leagues for good after the 1956 campaign. Oravetz then played his final seven pro seasons in the high minors, mostly in the Senators/Minnesota Twins organization. Coincidentally, in 1958, the Senators would feature another diminutive outfielder, 5 ft 5 in (1.65 m), 140 lb (64 kg) Albie Pearson.

Ernie Oravetz died in Tampa, Florida, where he had settled after his baseball career was over, at the age of 74.
