= Buddy Peterson =

American baseball player (1925–2006)

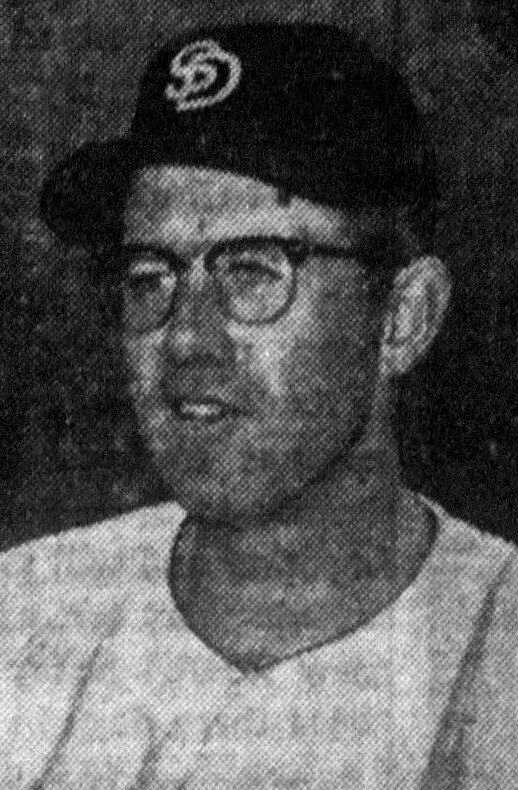
- Peterson in 1954
- Shortstop
- Born: April 23, 1925; Portland, Oregon, US
- Died: September 19, 2006 (aged 81); Sacramento, California, US
- Batted: Right Threw: Right

MLB debut
- September 14, 1955, for the Chicago White Sox

Last MLB appearance
- September 29, 1957, for the Baltimore Orioles

MLB statistics
- Batting average: .237
- Home runs: 0
- Runs batted in: 2

NPB statistics
- Batting average: .272
- Home runs: 58
- Runs batted in: 186
- Stats at Baseball Reference

Teams
- Chicago White Sox (1955); Baltimore Orioles (1957); Nankai Hawks (1961–1963)

Carl Francis "Buddy" Peterson (April 23, 1925 – September 19, 2006) was an American professional baseball player and manager who spent all but 13 games of his career at the minor league level. The native of Portland, Oregon, primarily a shortstop in his playing days, threw and batted right-handed, and stood 5 feet 9 1/2 inches (1.765 m) tall and weighed 170 pounds (77 kg).

Peterson's playing career extended from 1947 through 1960 and included two brief Major League trials — with the Chicago White Sox in September 1955 and the Baltimore Orioles in September 1957. Peterson recorded 38 at bats and made nine hits, including three doubles, for a batting average of .237, with two runs batted in. Peterson was a fixture in the Pacific Coast League during the 1950s, as the regular shortstop for three teams: the San Diego Padres, Vancouver Mounties and Sacramento Solons. He batted .280 in 2,005 minor league games, with 93 home runs.

Peterson also played three seasons (1961–1963) in Nippon Professional Baseball, appearing in 357 games for the Nankai Hawks of the Pacific League, and batting .272 with 344 hits.

After his playing career, Peterson managed in the farm systems of the New York Mets, Kansas City Royals and Oakland Athletics, with his final season as a skipper coming in 1974. He died at age 81 in Sacramento, California.
