= Bill Froats =

American baseball player (1930–1998)

- Pitcher
- Born: October 20, 1930; New York City, U.S.
- Died: February 9, 1998 (aged 67); Minneapolis, Minnesota, U.S.
- Batted: Left Threw: Left

MLB debut
- April 22, 1955, for the Detroit Tigers

Last MLB appearance
- April 22, 1955, for the Detroit Tigers

MLB statistics
- Games pitched: 1
- Win–loss record: 0–0
- Earned run average: 0.00
- Innings pitched: 2
- Stats at Baseball Reference

Teams
- Detroit Tigers (1955)

William John Froats (October 20, 1930 – February 9, 1998) was an American Major League Baseball pitcher. A native of New York City, the 6 ft 0 in (1.83 m), 180 lb. left-hander was signed by the Detroit Tigers before the 1951 season. He appeared in one game for Detroit in 1955.

The 24-year-old rookie took the mound on April 22, 1955, at Cleveland Stadium in the bottom of the 7th inning with the Tigers trailing the Cleveland Indians. He pitched two scoreless innings for Detroit, giving up two walks and no hits. The final score was Indians 8, Tigers 5. Froats was credited with a game finished, and his lifetime earned run average stands at 0.00.

He was drafted by the New York Giants from the Tigers on December 3, 1956. He never again appeared in a major league contest but had a successful career with the Buffalo Bisons of the AAA International League.

William John Froats was the son of surgeon Esley Robert Froats (1903–1954) and his wife Marguerite McCarney. He served in the US Army from 1952 to 1954. He died at the age of 67 in Minneapolis, Minnesota and was buried at the Gate of Heaven Cemetery outside of New York City.
