= Bobby Kline =

American baseball player (1929–2021)

- Shortstop
- Born: January 27, 1929; St. Petersburg, Florida, U.S.
- Died: October 26, 2021 (aged 92); St. Petersburg, Florida, U.S.
- Batted: Right Threw: Right

MLB debut
- April 11, 1955, for the Washington Senators

Last MLB appearance
- September 25, 1955, for the Washington Senators

MLB statistics
- Batting average: .221
- Home runs: 0
- Runs batted in: 9
- Stats at Baseball Reference

Teams
- Washington Senators (1955)

John Robert Kline (January 27, 1929 – October 26, 2021) was an American professional baseball player. A shortstop, his 12-year career included one season in Major League Baseball as a member of the 1955 Washington Senators. Kline threw and batted right-handed and was listed as 6 feet (1.8 m) tall and 179 pounds (81 kg).

== Biography ==
Kline was born in St. Petersburg, Florida. His career began in 1947 at the Class C level of minor league baseball. By 1950, he was part of the New York Yankees' organization. In 1954 he was the All-Star shortstop of the Double-A Southern Association, and at the end of that season he was selected by Washington in the Rule 5 draft. He was the starting shortstop for the home side in the annual Presidential Opener at Griffith Stadium on April 11, 1955; he was hitless in two at-bats against Lou Kretlow of the Baltimore Orioles and left the game for a pinch hitter in the sixth inning. He then started four more games at shortstop for Washington, but by April 20, he was still looking for his first MLB hit, having gone 0-for-13. After a spell on the bench, Kline's playing time increased in May and June, and by June 7, he had raised his batting average to .263, his high-water mark for the year. He fell into another drought at the plate, however, and started only one game for the Senators after July 17.

He finished his one major league season with a .221 batting average in 77 games played and 140 at-bats, with nine career runs batted in; his 31 hits included 5 doubles. He started 44 games at shortstop (second to José Valdivielso) and 3 at second base. At shortstop, he compiled a fielding percentage of .943 with 15 errors in 265 total chances. In February 1956, the Senators traded him back to the Yankees as part of a six-player transaction. Kline retired from the game in 1958, having played 11 seasons in the minor leagues for 10 teams.

Kline died on October 26, 2021, in St. Petersburg.
