= James Atkins (baseball) =

American baseball player (1921–2009)

- Pitcher
- Born: March 10, 1921; Birmingham, Alabama, U.S.
- Died: February 28, 2009 (aged 87); Hanceville, Alabama, U.S.
- Batted: Left Threw: Right

MLB debut
- September 29, 1950, for the Boston Red Sox

Last MLB appearance
- May 10, 1952, for the Boston Red Sox

MLB statistics
- Win–loss record: 0–1
- Earned run average: 3.60
- Strikeouts: 2
- Stats at Baseball Reference

Teams
- Boston Red Sox (1950, 1952)

James Curtis Atkins (March 10, 1921 – February 28, 2009) was an American pitcher in Major League Baseball who played for the Boston Red Sox in the 1950 and 1952 seasons. Listed at 6 feet 3 inches (1.91 m) tall and 205 pounds (93 kg), Atkins batted left-handed and threw right-handed. He was born in Birmingham, Alabama.

Atkins' pro career began in 1941 and was interrupted from 1942 to 1945 by his service as a United States Marine in the Pacific Theater of Operations during World War II.

In a two-season MLB career, Atkins posted a 0–1 record with a 3.60 ERA, two strikeouts, 15 hits allowed and 11 bases on balls in 15 innings of work in four appearances (one as a starter). In his lone start, on April 21, 1952, at Fenway Park against the Washington Senators, Atkins allowed three hits and two earned runs in 7 1/3 innings. He also went two for three as a batter. But he surrendered five bases on balls and was the losing pitcher in a 3–2 Washington victory.

Atkins won 145 games in the minor leagues, including one 19-win season (1951), and retired from baseball after the 1957 season. He died in Hanceville, Alabama, at the age of 87.
