= Joe Trimble =

American baseball player (1930–2011)

- Pitcher
- Born: October 12, 1930; Providence, Rhode Island, U.S.
- Died: August 11, 2011 (aged 80); Lincoln, Rhode Island, U.S.
- Batted: Right Threw: Right

MLB debut
- April 29, 1955, for the Boston Red Sox

Last MLB appearance
- July 14, 1957, for the Pittsburgh Pirates

MLB statistics
- Win–loss record: 0–2
- Earned run average: 7.48
- Innings pitched: 21 2/3
- Stats at Baseball Reference

Teams
- Boston Red Sox (1955); Pittsburgh Pirates (1957)

Joseph Gerard Trimble (October 12, 1930 – August 11, 2011) was an American pitcher in Major League Baseball who played in seven games over all or part of two seasons for the Boston Red Sox (1955) and Pittsburgh Pirates (1957). Listed at 6 feet 1 inch (1.85 m) tall and 190 pounds (86 kg), he batted and threw right-handed. He was born in Providence, Rhode Island, where he attended La Salle Academy.

Trimble entered professional baseball in 1948 in his home city with the Providence Grays, an independently operated club in the Class B New England League. Later that year he joined the Cincinnati Reds' organization, spending two full years in the mid-minors before developing a sore arm and drawing his unconditional release. He then missed the 1951–1953 seasons, serving for part of that time in the United States Marines during the Korean War.

After his discharge from the Marines, Trimble, a free agent, signed with the Pirates' organization. He spent 1954 in the Class B Carolina League, then was selected by the Red Sox in that autumn's Rule 5 draft. He broke camp with Boston as a member of the Red Sox' 28-man early-season roster. In two appearances, both in relief, and two innings of work, he allowed no runs and no hits, although he issued three bases on balls. He fanned one batter, future Baseball Hall of Famer Minnie Miñoso.

Trimble was returned to the Pittsburgh system after his second Bosox appearance, pitching in the Open-Classification Pacific Coast League—then the highest level in minor league baseball—for two seasons with the Hollywood Stars. In 1957, Trimble spent the entire year on the Pirates' MLB roster, although he was sidelined by arm trouble for most of the season. He worked in five games for the Pirates, including four starts, dropping his only two decisions and posting an ineffective 8.24 earned run average, allowing seven home runs in only 192/3 innings pitched. He ended his pro career after spending 1958 in the Pacific Coast League.

In MLB, Trimble compiled a 0–2 record with a 7.48 ERA in seven total appearances, giving up 19 runs (one unearned) on 23 hits and 16 walks while striking out ten in 212/3 innings pitched.

He returned to Rhode Island after his playing career, working in the soft-drink industry and playing senior amateur hockey into his 50s.
