= Bob Scherbarth =

American baseball player (1926–2009)

- Catcher
- Born: January 18, 1926; Milwaukee, Wisconsin, U.S.
- Died: January 31, 2009 (aged 83); Presque Isle, Wisconsin, U.S.
- Batted: Right Threw: Right

MLB debut
- April 23, 1950, for the Boston Red Sox

Last MLB appearance
- April 23, 1950, for the Boston Red Sox

MLB statistics
- Batting average: .000
- Games played: 1
- At bats: 0
- Stats at Baseball Reference

Teams
- Boston Red Sox (1950)

Robert Elmer Scherbarth (January 18, 1926 – January 1, 2009) was an American catcher in Major League Baseball who played briefly for the Boston Red Sox during the 1950 season. Listed at 6' 0", 180 lb., Scherbarth batted and threw right-handed. He was born in Milwaukee, Wisconsin.

Like Moonlight Graham from Field of Dreams fame, Scherbarth was one of many players since 1900 who appeared in a game but never had a plate appearance. He made his debut on April 23, 1950, as a defensive replacement in the 8th inning for Birdie Tebbetts. Scherbarth neither batted nor had a fielding chance during his debut and never appeared in another Major League game.

Scherbarth's minor league baseball career spanned seven seasons, from 1946 to 1952. He spent his entire career in the Red Sox organization, including three seasons for their top farm team, the Louisville Colonels. After his baseball career, Scherbarth went into the printing business.

Scherbarth died in Presque Isle, Wisconsin, at the age of 83.

== See also ==
- 1950 Boston Red Sox season
