= Willard Nixon =

American baseball player (1928–2000)

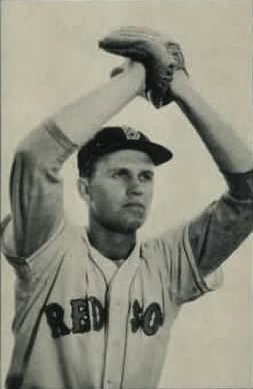
- Nixon in 1953
- Pitcher
- Born: June 17, 1928; Taylorsville, Georgia, U.S.
- Died: December 10, 2000 (aged 72); Rome, Georgia, U.S.
- Batted: Left Threw: Right

MLB debut
- July 7, 1950, for the Boston Red Sox

Last MLB appearance
- July 4, 1958, for the Boston Red Sox

MLB statistics
- Win–loss record: 69–72
- Earned run average: 4.39
- Strikeouts: 616
- Stats at Baseball Reference

Teams
- Boston Red Sox (1950–1958)

Willard Lee Nixon (June 17, 1928 – December 10, 2000) was an American pitcher in Major League Baseball who played his entire career with the Boston Red Sox between 1950 and 1958. Listed at 6 feet 2 inches (1.88 m) tall and 195 pounds (88 kg), Nixon batted left-handed and threw right-handed.

The native of Taylorsville, Georgia, signed with the Red Sox as a free agent in 1948 out of Auburn University. In his nine-season career, he posted a 69–72 record with a 4.39 ERA and 616 strikeouts in 225 appearances, including 177 starts, 51 complete games, nine shutouts and three saves. In 1,234 innings pitched he surrendered 1,277 hits and 530 bases on balls.

Nixon was an above average hitting pitcher, posting a .242 batting average (111-for-459) with 42 runs, 2 home runs, 41 RBIs and drawing 42 bases on balls. He was also good defensively, recording a .977 fielding percentage which was 20 points higher than the league average at his position.

Nixon had a 12–10 mark with the 1955 Red Sox. Four of those wins came at the expense of the New York Yankees. In 1954 and 1955, Nixon beat the Yankees five straight times. Although his numbers against the Yanks deteriorated during his final two campaigns (1957 and 1958), his previous success—going 11–6 in 25 games pitched—earned him the nickname "Yankee Killer." Over his career, he won half of his 24 decisions, threw ten complete games and two shutouts, and compiled a 3.54 ERA against the Bombers.

Hobbled by a sore arm, Nixon retired from the field after the 1958 season, which he spent between Boston and Triple-A. He scouted for the Red Sox from 1959 to 1963 before entering private business. He died in Rome, Georgia, at age 72.
