= Juan Delis =

Cuban baseball player (1928-2003)

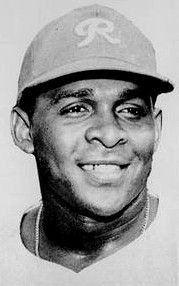
- Third baseman / Outfielder
- Born: February 27, 1928; Santiago de Cuba, Cuba
- Died: July 23, 2003 (aged 75); Havana, Cuba
- Batted: Right Threw: Right

MLB debut
- April 16, 1955, for the Washington Senators

Last MLB appearance
- September 18, 1955, for the Washington Senators

MLB statistics
- Batting average: .189
- Home runs: 0
- Runs batted in: 11
- Stats at Baseball Reference

Teams
- Washington Senators (1955)

Juan Francisco Delis (February 27, 1928 – July 23, 2003) was a Cuban professional baseball player. He was a third baseman and outfielder in Major League Baseball who appeared in 54 games for the 1955 Washington Senators. He threw and batted right-handed, stood 5 feet 11 inches (1.80 m) tall and weighed 170 pounds (77 kg).

Delis' organized baseball career began in 1952 in the Washington organization; he also played in the Cuban Winter League, winning the "Rookie of the Year" award during the 1953–54 season. His one year in the majors saw Delis make 25 hits, including three doubles and one triple. He had three three-hit games: against Detroit on April 30, against Boston on May 21, and against New York in his next contest, on May 24. He started 21 games at third base and eight in the outfield.

After his major league career, Delis played in the high levels of minor league baseball through 1964, and retired after the 1966 season. He led the Mexican League in doubles with 43 in 1960 and 37 in 1962.
