= Sandy Consuegra =

Cuban baseball player (1920–2005)

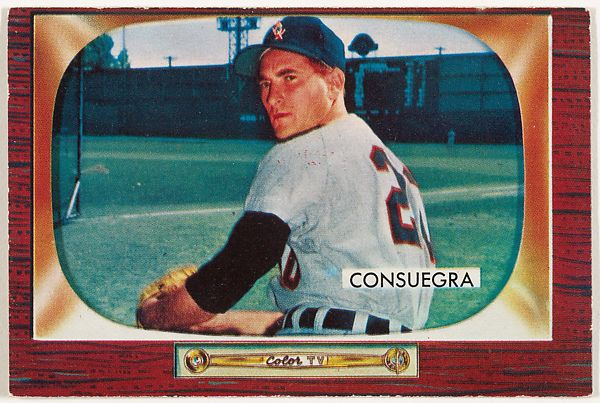
- Pitcher
- Born: September 3, 1920; Potrerillo, Cuba
- Died: November 16, 2005 (aged 85); Miami, Florida, U.S.
- Batted: Right Threw: Right

MLB debut
- June 10, 1950, for the Washington Senators

Last MLB appearance
- May 28, 1957, for the New York Giants

MLB statistics
- Win–loss record: 51–32
- Earned run average: 3.37
- Strikeouts: 193
- Stats at Baseball Reference

Teams
- Washington Senators (1950–1953); Chicago White Sox (1953–1956); Baltimore Orioles (1956–1957); New York Giants (1957)

Career highlights and awards
- All-Star (1954)
Medals
Men's baseball
Representing Cuba
Baseball World Cup
| Gold medal – first place | 1943 Havana | Team |
| Bronze medal – third place | 1944 Caracas | Team |

Sandalio Simeón Consuegra Castellón [con-SWEH-grah] (September 3, 1920 – November 16, 2005) was a Cuban-born Major League Baseball pitcher with the Washington Senators (1950-1953), Chicago White Sox (1953-1956), Baltimore Orioles (1956-1957) and New York Giants (1957). He batted and threw right-handed.

In an eight-season career, Consuegra posted a 51–32 record with 26 saves and a 3.37 ERA in 809.1 innings. He pitched in 248 games, starting 71 of them.

A native of Potrerillo, a town from the municipality of Cruces in the province of Cienfuegos, Cuba, Consuegra made his major league debut in 1950 with the Washington Senators when he was 29 years old. Previously, he had played with the Havana Cubans, the first Cuban team in the American minor league system.

The Chicago White Sox purchased Consuegra from Washington in the 1953 midseason. He went 16–3 during his 1954 All-Star season with the White Sox, leading the American League with a .842 winning percentage, and included a league-high eight relief wins without a defeat. His 2.69 ERA was second in the league to the Cleveland Indians' Mike Garcia (2.64).

Consuegra also played with the Baltimore Orioles and New York Giants. He announced his retirement at the end of the 1957-58 Cuban winter-ball season, though he made a brief comeback in the minors in 1961.

Following his playing career, Consuegra settled in Miami, Florida, where he died at age 85.

== Sources ==
- Career statistics from Baseball Reference · Retrosheet · Baseball Almanac
- SABR BioProject
- Baseball Reference minor league statistics
