= Ellis Kinder =

American baseball player (1914–1968)

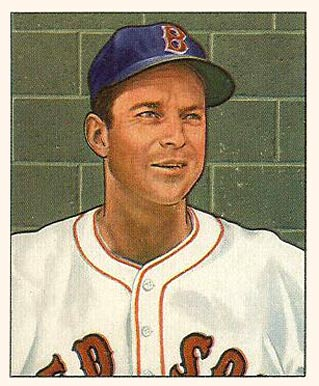
- Pitcher
- Born: July 26, 1914; Atkins, Arkansas, U.S.
- Died: October 16, 1968 (aged 54); Jackson, Tennessee, U.S.
- Batted: Right Threw: Right

MLB debut
- April 30, 1946, for the St. Louis Browns

Last MLB appearance
- May 8, 1957, for the Chicago White Sox

MLB statistics
- Win–loss record: 102–71
- Earned run average: 3.43
- Strikeouts: 749
- Saves: 104
- Stats at Baseball Reference

Teams
- St. Louis Browns (1946–1947); Boston Red Sox (1948–1955); St. Louis Cardinals (1956); Chicago White Sox (1956–1957)

Career highlights and awards
- Boston Red Sox Hall of Fame

Ellis Raymond "Old Folks" Kinder (July 26, 1914 – October 16, 1968) was an American Major League Baseball pitcher with the St. Louis Browns, Boston Red Sox, St. Louis Cardinals and the Chicago White Sox between 1946 and 1957. Kinder batted and threw right-handed. He was born in Atkins, Arkansas.

Despite making his MLB debut as a 31-year-old rookie, Kinder enjoyed a career which lasted over a decade. He is one of few pitchers in baseball history who won or saved a combined total of at least 200 games, and who were primarily starters for at least a third of their career.

Kinder was among the best starting pitchers in the American League in 1949, going 23–6 and leading the league in shutouts (6) and a .793 winning percentage, with a 130 adjusted ERA. In fact, Kinder's ERA+ for his four years as a starter were 87, 117, 130 and 115. Then, in 1951, the Red Sox, desperate for a relief pitcher, moved him to the pen, where he shone as the best reliever in the AL until 1955.

In his 12-year career, Kinder compiled a 102–71 record with 749 strikeouts, a 3.43 ERA, 56 complete games, 10 shutouts, 102 saves, and 1479.2 innings pitched in 484 games.

On May 17, 1947, a seagull flew over Fenway Park and dropped a three-pound smelt on Kinder while he was pitching for the St. Louis Browns. Nevertheless, Kinder beat Boston 4–2.

Ellis Kinder died in Jackson, Tennessee, at the age of 54, after undergoing open-heart surgery.

Highlights

- Twice Top 10 MVP (1949, 1951)
- Twice led league in winning percentage (1949, 1951)
- Led league in shutouts (1949)
- Twice led league in games pitched (63, 1951; 69, 1953)
- Twice led league in saves (1951, 1953)
- Pitched a 10 inning scoreless relief win-game (1951) (On July 12, 1951, Kinder took over to start the eighth inning and held the Chicago White Sox scoreless for 10 innings. The Red Sox finally scored a run in the 17th inning to win, 5–4.)
- The Sporting News Pitcher of the Year (1949)

== See also ==
- List of Major League Baseball annual saves leaders
- List of Major League Baseball annual shutout leaders
