= Al Papai =

American baseball player (1917–1995)

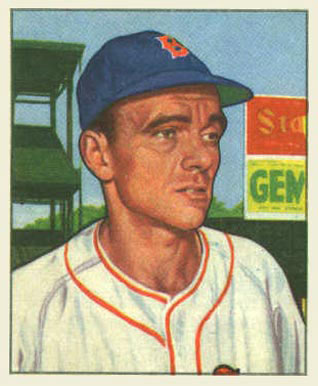
- Pitcher
- Born: May 7, 1917; Divernon, Illinois, U.S.
- Died: September 7, 1995 (aged 78); Springfield, Illinois, U.S.
- Batted: Right Threw: Right

MLB debut
- April 24, 1948, for the St. Louis Cardinals

Last MLB appearance
- September 16, 1955, for the Chicago White Sox

MLB statistics
- Win–loss record: 9–14
- Earned run average: 5.37
- Strikeouts: 70
- Stats at Baseball Reference

Teams
- St. Louis Cardinals (1948, 1950); St. Louis Browns (1949); Boston Red Sox (1950); Chicago White Sox (1955)

Alfred Thomas Papai (May 7, 1917 – September 7, 1995) was an American pitcher in Major League Baseball who played between the 1948 and 1955 seasons for the St. Louis Cardinals (1948, 1950), St. Louis Browns (1949), Boston Red Sox (1950) and Chicago White Sox (1955). Listed at 6 ft 3 in (1.91 m), 185 lb., Papai batted and threw right-handed. He was born in Divernon, Illinois.

A knuckleballer specialist, Papai was one of 29 players to pitch for both St. Louis clubs. In his only major league full-season he went 4–11 with a 5.06 ERA for the helpless Browns. In parts of four seasons, he posted a 9–14 record with a 5.37 ERA in 88 appearances, including 18 starts, eight complete games, four saves, 70 strikeouts, 138 walks, and 239 2/3 innings of work.

Papai also enjoyed a brilliant minor league career as the pitching staff ace for the Houston Buffaloes of the Texas League, posting 20-win seasons for them (1947, 1951–53). He went 21–10, with a 2.45 ERA for the 1947 Dixie Series Champion Buffs and 23–9, with a 2.44 ERA for the 1951 Texas League kings. He also pitched in the Venezuelan Winter League during the 1951–52 and 1952–53 seasons, compiling a 15–16 mark with a 2.25 ERA in 47 appearances.

Papai died in Springfield, Illinois, at the age of 78.

== See also ==
- List of knuckleball pitchers
