= Dean Stone =

American baseball player (1930–2018)

- Pitcher
- Born: September 1, 1930; Moline, Illinois, U.S.
- Died: August 21, 2018 (aged 87); East Moline, Illinois, U.S.
- Batted: Left Threw: Left

MLB debut
- September 13, 1953, for the Washington Senators

Last MLB appearance
- June 21, 1963, for the Baltimore Orioles

MLB statistics
- Win–loss record: 29–39
- Earned run average: 4.47
- Strikeouts: 380

NPB statistics
- Win–loss record: 0–0
- Earned run average: 3.75
- Strikeouts: 11
- Stats at Baseball Reference

Teams
- Washington Senators (1953–1957); Boston Red Sox (1957); St. Louis Cardinals (1959); Houston Colt .45s (1962); Chicago White Sox (1962); Baltimore Orioles (1963); Taiyo Whales (1964)

Career highlights and awards
- All-Star (1954)

Darrah Dean Stone (September 1, 1930 – August 21, 2018) was an American professional baseball player, a pitcher who appeared in 166 games over all or parts of eight Major League Baseball seasons. The well-traveled, 6 ft 4 in (1.93 m), 205 lb (93 kg) left-hander played for the Washington Senators (1953–1957), Boston Red Sox (1957), St. Louis Cardinals (1959), Houston Colt .45s (1962), Chicago White Sox (1962) and Baltimore Orioles (1963). He also played one season in Japan for the Taiyo Whales (1964).

Born in Moline, Illinois, Stone graduated from United Township High School in East Moline, prior to entering baseball in 1949.

Stone was the winning pitcher of the 1954 All-Star Game without retiring a single batter. This took place at Cleveland Stadium on July 13. He entered the game with two out in the top of the 8th to face Duke Snider, with the American League behind, 9–8. Red Schoendienst, the baserunner on third, tried to steal home and Stone threw him out at the plate. The A.L. then scored three runs in the bottom of the 8th and won the game 11–9, as Virgil Trucks hurled a scoreless 9th inning to save it.

After having pitched two minor league no-hitters in 1952 and going 8–10 with a 3.33 ERA for the Double-A Chattanooga Lookouts of the Southern Association in 1953, he reached the big leagues. His first appearance was in relief against the Detroit Tigers on September 13, 1953. He would go on to pitch the majority of his games (60%) in relief at the major league level.

In 1954 won a career-high 12 games, lost 10, had an earned run average of 3.22, and it was his only season as an All-Star. In his other seven years, he had a combined record of 17–29 with a 4.91 ERA.

Stone was a member of the expansion Houston Colt .45s of 1962. He pitched a three-hit complete game shutout—the first in franchise history—against the Chicago Cubs in Houston's third game (April 12), then another shutout against the Cubs one week later, giving the Colts a 5–3 record. He was traded to the Chicago White Sox for pitcher Russ Kemmerer on June 22. The Baltimore Orioles acquired Stone during the off-season, and he made his last major league appearance on June 21, 1963.

Career totals include a record of 29–39 in 215 games pitched, 85 games started, 19 complete games, 5 shutouts, 52 games finished, 12 saves, and an ERA of 4.47. In 686 innings he struck out 380 and walked 373. He had a batting average of .088 in 170 at bats with one home run.

== After baseball ==
Stone was the owner of a landscaping company in Silvis, Illinois. He died on August 21, 2018, at the age of 87, in East Moline.
