= Bob Chakales =

American baseball player (1927–2010)

- Pitcher
- Born: August 10, 1927; Asheville, North Carolina, U.S.
- Died: February 18, 2010 (aged 82); Richmond, Virginia, U.S.
- Batted: Right Threw: Right

MLB debut
- April 21, 1951, for the Cleveland Indians

Last MLB appearance
- September 17, 1957, for the Boston Red Sox

MLB statistics
- Win–loss record: 15–25
- Earned run average: 4.54
- Strikeouts: 187
- Stats at Baseball Reference

Teams
- Cleveland Indians (1951–1954); Baltimore Orioles (1954); Chicago White Sox (1955); Washington Senators (1955–1957); Boston Red Sox (1957)

Robert Edwards Chakales [sha-kuh'-les] (August 10, 1927 – February 18, 2010) was an American pitcher in Major League Baseball who played with four clubs between the 1951 and 1957 seasons. Listed at 6'1", 185 lb., Chakales batted and threw right-handed. He was born in Asheville, North Carolina.

Originally a starter, Chakales also filled various roles coming out from the bullpen, as a closer or middle reliever. He reached the majors in 1951 with the Cleveland Indians, spending three and a half years with them before moving to the Baltimore Orioles (1954), Chicago White Sox (1955), Washington Senators (1955–57) and Boston Red Sox (1957).

In his rookie year Chakales recorded two of his three wins helping himself with the bat, going 7–for–20 (.350) with one home run and six RBI. His most productive season came in 1954, when he posted career highs in wins (5), strikeouts (47), earned run average (3.43) and innings pitched (99.2) in 41 pitching appearances (six as a starter). After that, he was part of various trades that included players as Vic Wertz, Don Ferrarese, Clint Courtney, Johnny Groth, Jim Busby, Milt Bolling and Faye Throneberry.

In a seven-season career, Chakales went 15–25 with 187 strikeouts and a 4.54 ERA in 171 games, including 23 starts, three complete games, one shutout, 10 saves, and 225 walks in 420 1/3 innings of work. As a hitter, he posted a .271 average (26–for–96) with one home run and 9 RBI.

== Personal ==
His nickname was "The Golden Greek".

Chakales died in Richmond, Virginia, at the age of 82.

== Sources ==
- Career statistics from Baseball Reference · Baseball Reference (Minors) · Retrosheet · Baseball Almanac
- Retrosheet - player page
