= Johnny Groth =

American baseball player (1926–2021)

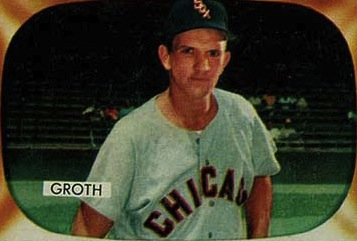
- Center fielder
- Born: July 23, 1926; Chicago, Illinois, U.S.
- Died: August 7, 2021 (aged 95); Palm Beach, Florida, U.S.
- Batted: Right Threw: Right

MLB debut
- September 5, 1946, for the Detroit Tigers

Last MLB appearance
- July 28, 1960, for the Detroit Tigers

MLB statistics
- Batting average: .279
- Home runs: 60
- Runs batted in: 486
- Stats at Baseball Reference

Teams
- Detroit Tigers (1946–1952); St. Louis Browns (1953); Chicago White Sox (1954–1955); Washington Senators (1955); Kansas City Athletics (1956–1957); Detroit Tigers (1957–1960)

John Thomas Groth (July 23, 1926 – August 7, 2021) was an American professional baseball outfielder and scout who played 15 seasons in Major League Baseball (MLB).

He played with the Detroit Tigers, St. Louis Browns, Chicago White Sox, Washington Senators, and Kansas City Athletics from 1946 to 1960.

He threw and batted right-handed, stood 6 feet (1.8 m) tall and weighed 182 pounds (83 kg).

== Early life ==
Groth was born in Chicago on July 23, 1926. His parents, William Groth and Marie (Baltazore), immigrated to the United States from Germany. His father worked as an electrotype salesman. Groth attended the Latin School of Chicago, graduating in 1944. He subsequently enlisted in the United States Navy in February of the following year.

== Playing career ==
After being discharged from the Navy, Groth was signed as an amateur free agent by the Detroit Tigers on August 6, 1946. He was lauded by the Tigers as "the next DiMaggio" when he arrived on the major league scene in 1946 at age 20. He made his MLB debut one month later on September 5, entering as a defensive replacement for Hoot Evers in a 10–0 win over the Cleveland Indians.

Groth spent most of 1947 and 1948 in the minor leagues, where he twice batted over .300, and did not play in more than six MLB games until 1949. In 1948, he hit .340 with 40 home runs with the Buffalo in the Triple-A International League, leading the circuit in hits (199) and runs scored (124). Time, Collier's, The Saturday Evening Post, and Life all tabbed him for superstardom in 1949.

In 1949, rookie Groth hit .293 with a .407 on-base percentage, a .451 slugging percentage and 73 runs batted in in only 103 games with Detroit. On April 19, he hit home runs in two of his first three at bats, helping Hal Newhouser to a 5–1 win. Then, in 1950, he hit .306 with career-highs in home runs (12), RBIs (85), hits (173), and runs scored (95). At one point during the 1950 season, he had eight consecutive hits. Groth played ten more seasons in the American League, but never equalled his 1950 totals. In all, he spent 11 of 15 major league seasons with Detroit.

On December 4, 1952, the Tigers traded Virgil Trucks‚ who tossed two no-hitters during the year‚ along with Hal White and Groth‚ to the Browns in exchange for Owen Friend‚ Bob Nieman and Jay Porter. Groth bounced from the Browns to the White Sox to the Senators to the A's in the mid-1950s. In 1957, the Tigers brought Groth from the Athletics where he finished his career as a backup outfielder with the Tigers from 1957 to 1960. He played his final major league game on July 28, 1960, at the age of 34.

Over the course of his career, Groth played in 1,248 games, 964 as a center fielder, 121 as a left fielder, and 83 as a right fielder. He had a career batting average of .279 with a .352 on-base percentage, 1,064 hits, 480 runs scored, 486 RBIs, 419 walks, 197 doubles, and 60 home runs. His lifetime fielding percentage was .987, as he committed only 36 errors in 2,684 total chances.

== Scouting career ==
After retiring as a player, Groth scouted for the Milwaukee / Atlanta Braves, initially working for former Tiger player and executive John McHale. He also served the St. Louis Cardinals in that role. He retired in 1990.

== Personal life ==
Groth was married to Betty for 72 years before his death. Together, they had eleven children. They resided in Palm Beach, Florida, during their later years.

Groth died on August 7, 2021, at his home in Palm Beach. He was 95 years old.

== See also ==
- 1950 Detroit Tigers season
