= 1955 Baltimore Orioles season =

Major League Baseball season

1955 Baltimore Orioles
- League: American League
- Ballpark: Memorial Stadium
- City: Baltimore, Maryland
- Record: 57–97 (.370)
- League place: 7th
- Owners: Jerold Hoffberger, Joseph Iglehart and Clarence Miles
- General managers: Paul Richards
- Managers: Paul Richards
- Television: WMAR-TV/WAAM/WBAL-TV (Ernie Harwell, Bailey Goss)
- Radio: WCBM (Ernie Harwell, Chuck Thompson, Bailey Goss)

The 1955 Baltimore Orioles season was the second season played in Baltimore. It involved the Orioles finishing 7th in the American League with a record of 57 wins and 97 losses, 39 games behind the AL champion New York Yankees. The team was managed by first-year manager Paul Richards and played their home games at Baltimore's Memorial Stadium. The franchise operated at a loss of $86,715 due to a 208,871 decline in home attendance from the previous season and a $400,000 player personnel investment, half of which was paid to bonus babies Wayne Causey, Jim Pyburn, Tom Gastall, Tex Nelson and Bruce Swango.

== Offseason ==
In the fall of 1954, the Orioles further distanced themselves from their Browns past by making a 17-player trade with the New York Yankees that included most former Browns of note still on the Baltimore roster. Indeed, to this day the Orioles make almost no mention of their past as the Browns. Though the deal did little to improve the short-term competitiveness of the club, it helped establish a fresh identity for the Oriole franchise.

The details of the trade were as follows: Don Larsen, Billy Hunter, Bob Turley, and players to be named later were traded by the Orioles to the New York Yankees for Gene Woodling, Harry Byrd, Jim McDonald, Hal Smith, Gus Triandos, Willy Miranda and players to be named later. The deal was completed on December 1, when the Yankees sent Bill Miller, Kal Segrist, Don Leppert, and Ted Del Guercio (minors) to the Orioles, and the Orioles sent Mike Blyzka, Darrell Johnson, Jim Fridley, and Dick Kryhoski to the Yankees.

Unlike other clubs that transferred in the 1950s, retaining their nickname and a sense of continuity with their past (such as the Brooklyn-Los Angeles Dodgers and New York-San Francisco Giants), the St. Louis Browns were renamed upon their transfer, implicitly distancing themselves at least somewhat from their history.

=== Other notable transactions ===
- December 6, 1954: Bob Chakales, Jim Brideweser and Clint Courtney were traded by the Orioles to the Chicago White Sox for Don Ferrarese, Don Johnson, Matt Batts, and Fred Marsh.
- December 13, 1954: Harry Schwegeman (minors), Johnny Jancse (minors) and $50,000 were traded by the Orioles to the Brooklyn Dodgers for Billy Cox and Preacher Roe.

== Regular season ==
=== Season standings ===
American League
Team	W	L	Pct.	GB	Home	Road
New York Yankees	96	58	.623	—	52‍–‍25	44‍–‍33
Cleveland Indians	93	61	.604	3	49‍–‍28	44‍–‍33
Chicago White Sox	91	63	.591	5	49‍–‍28	42‍–‍35
Boston Red Sox	84	70	.545	12	47‍–‍31	37‍–‍39
Detroit Tigers	79	75	.513	17	46‍–‍31	33‍–‍44
Kansas City Athletics	63	91	.409	33	33‍–‍43	30‍–‍48
Baltimore Orioles	57	97	.370	39	30‍–‍47	27‍–‍50
Washington Senators	53	101	.344	43	28‍–‍49	25‍–‍52

=== Record vs. opponents ===
1955 American League record Sources:
Team	BAL	BOS	CWS	CLE	DET	KCA	NYY	WSH
Baltimore	—	8–14	10–12–1	3–19	9–13	10–12–1	3–19	14–8
Boston	14–8	—	9–13	11–11	13–9	14–8	8–14	15–7
Chicago	12–10–1	13–9	—	10–12	14–8	14–8	11–11	17–5
Cleveland	19–3	11–11	12–10	—	12–10	17–5	13–9	9–13
Detroit	13–9	9–13	8–14	10–12	—	12–10	10–12	17–5
Kansas City	12–10–1	8–14	8–14	5–17	10–12	—	7–15	13–9
New York	19–3	14–8	11–11	9–13	12–10	15–7	—	16–6
Washington	8–14	7–15	5–17	13–9	5–17	9–13	6–16	—

=== Notable transactions ===
- June 15, 1955: Billy Cox and Gene Woodling were traded by the Orioles to the Cleveland Indians for Dave Pope and Wally Westlake. Billy Cox refused to report to his new team. The Baltimore Orioles sent $15,000 to the Cleveland Indians as compensation.
- July 2, 1955: Dave Philley was selected off waivers by the Orioles from the Cleveland Indians.
- July 9, 1955: Wally Westlake was released by the Orioles.
- July 30, 1955: Jim McDonald was traded by the Orioles to the New York Yankees for Ed Lopat.

=== Roster ===
1955 Baltimore Orioles
Roster
Pitchers: 37 Bob Alexander; 28 Hal Brown; 24 Harry Byrd; 35 Joe Coleman; 23 Harry Dorish; 46 Don Ferrarese; 25 Ted Gray; 25 Bob Harrison; 19 Don Johnson; 23 Lou Kretlow; 15 Bob Kuzava; 13 Chuck Locke; 15 Eddie Lopat; 25 Jim McDonald; 13 Bill Miller; 29 Ray Moore; 16 Erv Palica; 28 Duane Pillette; 27 Saul Rogovin; 20 Art Schallock; 17 Bill Wight; 36 Jim Wilson; 35 George Zuverink	Catchers: 10 Tom Gastall; 10 Les Moss; 22 Hal Smith; Infielders: 33 Wayne Causey; 3 Billy Cox; 6 Bob Hale; 9,40 Don Leppert; 5 Hank Majeski; 2 Fred Marsh; 7 Willy Miranda; 8 Jim Pyburn; 40 Brooks Robinson; 24 Kal Segrist; 4 Vern Stephens; 11 Gus Triandos; 9 Eddie Waitkus; 5 Bobby Young	Outfielders: 18 Cal Abrams; 21 Gil Coan; 5 Angelo Dagres; 32 Chuck Diering; 14 Jim Dyck; 17 Hoot Evers; 33 Bob Kennedy; 24 Roger Marquis; 37 Tex Nelson; 4 Dave Philley; 3 Dave Pope; 14 Wally Westlake; 14 Gene Woodling; Other batters: 34 Charlie Maxwell	Manager: 12 Paul Richards; Coaches: 31 Harry Brecheen; 34 Lloyd Brown; 26 Lum Harris; 30 Al Vincent

== Player stats ==
=== Batting ===
==== Starters by position ====
Note: Pos = Position; G = Games played; AB = At bats; H = Hits; Avg. = Batting average; HR = Home runs; RBI = Runs batted in

Pos	Player	G	AB	H	Avg.	HR	RBI
C	Hal W. Smith	135	424	115	.271	4	52
1B	Gus Triandos	140	481	133	.277	12	65
2B	Fred Marsh	89	303	66	.218	2	19
SS	Willy Miranda	153	487	124	.255	1	38
3B	Wayne Causey	68	175	34	.194	1	9
LF	Jim Dyck	61	197	55	.279	2	22
CF	Chuck Diering	137	371	95	.256	3	31
RF	Dave Philley	83	311	93	.299	6	41

==== Other batters ====
Note: G = Games played; AB = At bats; H = Hits; Avg. = Batting average; HR = Home runs; RBI = Runs batted in

Player	G	AB	H	Avg.	HR	RBI
Cal Abrams	118	309	75	.243	6	32
Dave Pope	86	222	55	.248	1	30
Billy Cox	53	194	41	.211	3	14
Bobby Young	59	186	37	.199	1	8
Hoot Evers	60	185	44	.238	6	30
Bob Hale	67	182	65	.357	0	29
Gene Woodling	47	145	32	.221	3	18
Gil Coan	61	130	31	.238	1	11
Jim Pyburn	39	98	20	.204	0	7
Eddie Waitkus	38	85	22	.259	0	9
Don Leppert	40	70	8	.114	0	2
Bob Kennedy	26	70	10	.143	0	5
Les Moss	29	56	19	.339	2	6
Hank Majeski	16	41	7	.171	0	2
Tex Nelson	25	31	6	.194	0	1
Tom Gastall	20	27	4	.148	0	0
Wally Westlake	8	24	3	.125	0	0
Brooks Robinson	6	22	2	.091	0	1
Angelo Dagres	8	15	4	.267	0	3
Kal Segrist	7	9	3	.333	0	0
Vern Stephens	3	6	1	.167	0	0
Charlie Maxwell	4	4	0	.000	0	0
Roger Marquis	1	1	0	.000	0	0

=== Pitching ===
==== Starting pitchers ====
Note: G = Games pitched; IP = Innings pitched; W = Wins; L = Losses; ERA = Earned run average; SO = Strikeouts

Player	G	IP	W	L	ERA	SO
Jim Wilson	34	235.1	12	18	3.44	96
Erv Palica	33	169.2	5	11	4.14	68
Bill Wight	19	117.1	6	8	2.45	54
Saul Rogovin	14	71.0	1	8	4.56	35
Ed Lopat	10	49.0	3	4	4.22	10

==== Other pitchers ====
Note: G = Games pitched; IP = Innings pitched; W = Wins; L = Losses; ERA = Earned run average; SO = Strikeouts

Player	G	IP	W	L	ERA	SO
Ray Moore	46	151.2	10	10	3.92	80
George Zuverink	28	86.1	4	3	2.19	31
Art Schallock	30	80.1	3	5	4.15	33
Don Johnson	31	68.0	2	4	5.82	27
Harry Byrd	14	65.1	3	2	4.55	25
Hal Brown	15	57.0	0	4	4.11	26
Jim McDonald	21	51.2	3	5	7.14	20
Lou Kretlow	15	38.1	0	4	8.22	26
Duane Pillette	7	20.2	0	3	6.53	13
Ted Gray	9	15.1	1	2	8.22	8
Bob Kuzava	6	12.1	0	1	3.65	5
Joe Coleman	6	11.2	0	1	10.80	4
Bill Miller	5	4.0	0	1	13.50	4

==== Relief pitchers ====
Note: G = Games pitched; W = Wins; L = Losses; SV = Saves; ERA = Earned run average; SO = Strikeouts

Player	G	W	L	SV	ERA	SO
Fritz Dorish	35	3	3	6	3.15	22
Don Ferrarese	6	0	0	0	3.00	5
Bob Alexander	4	1	0	0	13.50	1
Chuck Locke	2	0	0	0	0.00	1
Bob Harrison	1	0	0	0	9.00	0

== Awards and honors ==
All-Star Game

- Jim Wilson, reserve

== Farm system ==
Level	Team	League	Manager
AA	San Antonio Missions	Texas League	Don Heffner
A	Wichita Indians	Western League	Bud Bates
B	Fayetteville Highlanders	Carolina League	Aaron Robinson, Jack McKeon and Jack Sanford
B	York White Roses	Piedmont League	George Staller
C	Pine Bluff Judges/Meridian Millers	Cotton States League	Bob Knoke and Merrill Smith
C	Aberdeen Pheasants	Northern League	Bill Krueger
C	Thetford Mines Mineurs	Provincial League	Barney Lutz
D	Cordele Orioles	Georgia–Florida League	Lloyd Brown and Max Carey
D	Paris Orioles	Sooner State League	Jimmy Adair

Pine Bluff franchise transferred to Meridian and renamed, June 16, 1955
