= 1955 New York Yankees season =

Season for the Major League Baseball team the New York Yankees

1955 New York Yankees
- American League Champions
- League: American League
- Ballpark: Yankee Stadium
- City: New York City
- Record: 96–58 (.623)
- League place: 1st
- Owners: Dan Topping and Del Webb
- General managers: George Weiss
- Managers: Casey Stengel
- Television: WPIX
- Radio: WINS (AM) (Mel Allen, Jim Woods, Red Barber)

The 1955 New York Yankees season was the team's 53rd season. The team finished with a record of 96 wins and 58 losses, winning their 21st pennant, finishing 3 games ahead of the Cleveland Indians. New York was managed by Casey Stengel. The Yankees played their home games at Yankee Stadium. In the World Series, they were defeated by the Brooklyn Dodgers in 7 games.

== Offseason ==
- November 17, 1954: Gene Woodling, Harry Byrd, Jim McDonald, Hal Smith, Gus Triandos, Willy Miranda and players to be named later were traded by the Yankees to the Baltimore Orioles for Don Larsen, Billy Hunter, Bob Turley, and players to be named later. The deal was completed on December 1, when the Yankees sent Bill Miller, Kal Segrist, Don Leppert, and Ted Del Guercio (minors) to the Orioles, and the Orioles sent Mike Blyzka, Darrell Johnson, Jim Fridley, and Dick Kryhoski to the Yankees.

== Regular season ==
=== Season standings ===
American League
Team	W	L	Pct.	GB	Home	Road
New York Yankees	96	58	.623	—	52‍–‍25	44‍–‍33
Cleveland Indians	93	61	.604	3	49‍–‍28	44‍–‍33
Chicago White Sox	91	63	.591	5	49‍–‍28	42‍–‍35
Boston Red Sox	84	70	.545	12	47‍–‍31	37‍–‍39
Detroit Tigers	79	75	.513	17	46‍–‍31	33‍–‍44
Kansas City Athletics	63	91	.409	33	33‍–‍43	30‍–‍48
Baltimore Orioles	57	97	.370	39	30‍–‍47	27‍–‍50
Washington Senators	53	101	.344	43	28‍–‍49	25‍–‍52

=== Record vs. opponents ===
1955 American League record Sources:
Team	BAL	BOS	CWS	CLE	DET	KCA	NYY	WSH
Baltimore	—	8–14	10–12–1	3–19	9–13	10–12–1	3–19	14–8
Boston	14–8	—	9–13	11–11	13–9	14–8	8–14	15–7
Chicago	12–10–1	13–9	—	10–12	14–8	14–8	11–11	17–5
Cleveland	19–3	11–11	12–10	—	12–10	17–5	13–9	9–13
Detroit	13–9	9–13	8–14	10–12	—	12–10	10–12	17–5
Kansas City	12–10–1	8–14	8–14	5–17	10–12	—	7–15	13–9
New York	19–3	14–8	11–11	9–13	12–10	15–7	—	16–6
Washington	8–14	7–15	5–17	13–9	5–17	9–13	6–16	—

=== Notable transactions ===
- May 11, 1955: Enos Slaughter and Johnny Sain were traded by the Yankees to the Kansas City Athletics for Sonny Dixon and cash.
- July 30, 1955: Ed Lopat was traded by the Yankees to the Baltimore Orioles for Jim McDonald.
- September 14, 1955: Jerry Staley was selected off waivers by the New York Yankees from the Cincinnati Redlegs.

=== Roster ===
1955 New York Yankees roster
Roster
Pitchers: 23 Tommy Byrne; 30 Rip Coleman; 16 Whitey Ford; 39 Ted Gray; 55 Bob Grim; 21 Jim Konstanty; 53 Johnny Kucks; 18 Don Larsen; 30 Ed Lopat; 28 Tom Morgan; 11 Johnny Sain; 38 Art Schallock; 24 Gerry Staley; 47 Tom Sturdivant; 19 Bob Turley; 39 Bob Wiesler	Catchers: 35 Lou Berberet; 8 Yogi Berra; 38 Johnny Blanchard; 29 Charlie Silvera; Infielders: 6 Andy Carey; 40 Tom Carroll; 42 Jerry Coleman; 15 Joe Collins; 20 Billy Hunter; 51 Frank Leja; 1 Billy Martin; 12 Gil McDougald; 17 Bobby Richardson; 10 Phil Rizzuto; 36 Eddie Robinson; 14 Bill Skowron; 41 Marv Throneberry	Outfielders: 9 Hank Bauer; 41 Bob Cerv; 32 Elston Howard; 7 Mickey Mantle; 25 Irv Noren; 44 Dick Tettelbach; Other batters: 17 Enos Slaughter	Manager: 37 Casey Stengel; Coaches: 2 Frankie Crosetti; 33 Bill Dickey; 31 Jim Turner

== Player stats ==
= Indicates team leader

= Indicates league leader

=== Batting ===
==== Starters by position ====
Note: Pos = Position; G = Games played; AB = At bats; H = Hits; Avg. = Batting average; HR = Home runs; RBI = Runs batted in

Pos	Player	G	AB	H	Avg.	HR	RBI
C	Yogi Berra	147	542	147	.272	27	108
1B	Bill Skowron	108	288	92	.319	12	61
2B	Gil McDougald	141	533	152	.285	13	53
3B	Andy Carey	135	510	131	.257	7	47
SS	Billy Hunter	98	255	58	.227	3	20
LF	Irv Noren	132	371	94	.253	8	59
CF	Mickey Mantle	147	517	158	.306	37	99
RF	Hank Bauer	139	492	137	.278	20	53

==== Other batters ====
Note: G = Games played; AB = At bats; H = Hits; Avg. = Batting average; HR = Home runs; RBI = Runs batted in

Player	G	AB	H	Avg.	HR	RBI
Elston Howard	97	279	81	.290	10	43
Joe Collins	105	278	65	.234	13	45
Eddie Robinson	88	173	26	.208	16	42
Phil Rizzuto	81	143	37	.259	1	9
Jerry Coleman	43	96	22	.229	0	8
Bob Cerv	55	85	29	.341	3	22
Billy Martin	20	70	21	.300	1	9
Bobby Richardson	11	26	4	.154	0	3
Charlie Silvera	14	26	5	.192	0	1
Enos Slaughter	10	9	1	.111	0	1
Tom Carroll	14	6	2	.333	0	0
Dick Tettelbach	2	5	0	.000	0	0
Lou Berberet	2	5	2	.400	0	2
Johnny Blanchard	1	3	0	.000	0	0
Marv Throneberry	1	2	2	1.000	0	3
Frank Leja	7	2	0	.000	0	0

=== Pitching ===
==== Starting pitchers ====
Note: G = Games pitched; IP = Innings pitched; W = Wins; L = Losses; ERA = Earned run average; SO = Strikeouts

Player	G	IP	W	L	ERA	SO
Whitey Ford	39	253.2	18*	7	2.63	137
Bob Turley	36	246.2	17	13	3.06	210
Tommy Byrne	27	160.0	16	5	3.15	76
Don Larsen	19	97.0	9	2	3.06	44
Ed Lopat	16	86.2	4	8	3.74	24
Ted Gray	1	3.0	0	0	3.00	1

- Tied with Bob Lemon and Frank Sullivan

==== Other pitchers ====
Note: G = Games pitched; IP = Innings pitched; W = Wins; L = Losses; ERA = Earned run average; SO = Strikeouts

Player	G	IP	W	L	ERA	SO
Johnny Kucks	29	126.2	8	7	3.41	49
Bob Grim	26	92.1	7	5	4.19	63
Bob Wiesler	16	53.0	0	2	3.91	22
Rip Coleman	10	29.0	1	1	5.28	15

==== Relief pitchers ====
Note: G = Games pitched; W = Wins; L = Losses; SV = Saves; ERA = Earned run average; SO = Strikeouts

Player	G	W	L	SV	ERA	SO
Jim Konstanty	45	7	2	11	2.32	19
Tom Morgan	40	7	3	10	3.25	17
Tom Sturdivant	33	1	3	0	3.16	48
Johnny Sain	3	0	0	0	6.75	5
Art Schallock	2	0	0	0	6.00	2
Gerry Staley	2	0	0	0	13.50	0

== 1955 World Series ==
In Game One on September 28, Elston Howard became the sixth player in the history of the World Series to hit a home run in his first World Series at bat.

NL Brooklyn Dodgers (4) vs. AL New York Yankees (3)

Game	Score	Date	Location	Attendance
1	Dodgers – 5, Yankees – 6	September 28	Yankee Stadium	63,869
2	Dodgers – 2, Yankees – 4	September 29	Yankee Stadium	64,707
3	Yankees – 3, Dodgers – 8	September 30	Ebbets Field	34,209
4	Yankees – 5, Dodgers – 8	October 1	Ebbets Field	36,242
5	Yankees – 3, Dodgers – 5	October 2	Ebbets Field	36,796
6	Dodgers – 1, Yankees – 5	October 3	Yankee Stadium	64,022
7	Dodgers – 2, Yankees – 0	October 4	Yankee Stadium	62,465

== Post-season exhibition ==
From October 11 to November 21, the Yankees embarked on a 25-game barnstorming exhibition tour. The team played five games in Hawaii, 16 games in Japan, one game in US-controlled Okinawa, two games in the Philippines, and one game in Guam; they won 24 of the 25 games and tied one game against an all-star team in Sendai.

== Awards and honors ==
- Yogi Berra, American League MVP

All-Star Game

=== League leaders ===
- Whitey Ford, league leader, complete games (Ford was the first player to lead the American League in complete games with fewer than 20)

== Farm system ==
Level	Team	League	Manager
AAA	Denver Bears	American Association	Ralph Houk
AA	Birmingham Barons	Southern Association	Phil Page
A	Binghamton Triplets	Eastern League	Snuffy Stirnweiss
B	Winston-Salem Twins	Carolina League	Ken Silvestri and Aaron Robinson
B	Quincy Gems	Illinois–Indiana–Iowa League	Vern Hoscheit
B	Norfolk Tars	Piedmont League	Al Evans, Alton Brown and Bill Herring
C	Modesto Reds	California League	Jerry Crosby
C	Monroe Sports	Cotton States League	Ed Head
D	Bristol Twins	Appalachian League	Dave Madison
D	Owensboro Oilers	KITTY League	Walter Lance and Ken Silvestri
D	McAlester Rockets	Sooner State League	Marvin Crater

LEAGUE CHAMPIONS: Monroe

Norfolk club folded, July 14, 1955
