= Jim McDonald (pitcher) =

American baseball player (1927–2004)

- Pitcher
- Born: May 17, 1927; Grants Pass, Oregon, U.S.
- Died: October 23, 2004 (aged 77); Kingman, Arizona, U.S.
- Batted: Right Threw: Right

MLB debut
- July 27, 1950, for the Boston Red Sox

Last MLB appearance
- April 26, 1958, for the Chicago White Sox

MLB statistics
- Win–loss record: 24–27
- Earned run average: 4.27
- Strikeouts: 158
- Stats at Baseball Reference

Teams
- Boston Red Sox (1950); St. Louis Browns / Baltimore Orioles (1951, 1955); New York Yankees (1952–1954); Chicago White Sox (1956–1958)

Career highlights and awards
- World Series champion (1953)

Jimmie Le Roy McDonald (May 17, 1927 – October 23, 2004) was an American pitcher in Major League Baseball who played for five different teams between 1950 and 1958. Listed at 5 feet 10 inches (1.78 m) tall and 185 pounds (84 kg), he batted and threw right-handed. The native of Grants Pass, Oregon, had a 16-year career (1945–1960) in professional baseball.

McDonald attended Modesto High School in Modesto, California. In the major leagues, McDonald worked a spot starter and filled various roles coming out of the bullpen as a middle reliever and set-up man. He debuted in the midst of the 1950 season with the Boston Red Sox, then joined the St. Louis Browns (1951), New York Yankees (1952–1954), Baltimore Orioles (1955) and Chicago White Sox (1956–1958). He went 3–4 with a 3.50 ERA in 26 appearances for the 1952 Yankees champions, including five starts, but did not pitch during the 1952 World Series. In 1953, he posted career-highs in wins (9), complete games (6), shutouts (2), and innings pitched (129 2/3). He also was the starter and winning pitcher in Game 5 of the 1953 World Series over the Brooklyn Dodgers at Ebbets Field. In that game, McDonald allowed only two runs, both earned, over his first seven innings pitched, as the Yankees built a 10–2 advantage. McDonald faltered somewhat in the eighth, permitting four runs (three of them on a home run by Billy Cox) before he was relieved by left-hander Bob Kuzava. But the Yankees prevailed, 11–7, and won the Series in six games the following day.

In a nine-season MLB career, McDonald posted a 24–27 record with a 4.37 ERA in 136 games, including 55 starts, 15 complete games, three shutouts, 30 games finished, and one save. He allowed 489 hits and 231 bases on balls, with 158 strikeouts, in 468 career innings pitched.

== Transactions ==
- Before the 1945 season was signed by the Boston Red Sox as a free agent.
- During the 1951 midseason, McDonald was sent by Boston, along with Matt Batts and Jim Suchecki, to the St. Louis Browns in exchange for Les Moss.
- Before the 1952 season was traded by St. Louis to the Yankees for Clint Courtney, who was the first catcher to wear glasses in major league history.
- In a 17-player trade before the 1955 season, the Yankees sent McDonald, Harry Byrd, Don Leppert, Bill Miller, Willy Miranda, Kal Segrist, Hal Smith, Gus Triandos, Gene Woodling, and a minor leaguer to the Baltimore Orioles, in exchange for Mike Blyzka, Jim Fridley, Billy Hunter, Darrell Johnson, Dick Kryhoski, Don Larsen and Bob Turley.
- In the 1955 midseason, was returned by Baltimore to the Yankees for Ed Lopat, but did not play for them.
- In 1956, he was dealt by New York to the Orioles, then purchased by the Chicago White Sox from Baltimore.
