= Mike Blyzka =

American baseball player (1928–2004)

- Pitcher
- Born: December 25, 1928; Hamtramck, Michigan, U.S.
- Died: October 13, 2004 (aged 75); Cheyenne, Wyoming, U.S.
- Batted: Right Threw: Right

MLB debut
- April 21, 1953, for the St. Louis Browns

Last MLB appearance
- September 25, 1954, for the Baltimore Orioles

MLB statistics
- Win–loss record: 3–11
- Earned run average: 5.58
- Strikeouts: 58
- Stats at Baseball Reference

Teams
- St. Louis Browns / Baltimore Orioles (1953–1954)

Michael John Blyzka (December 25, 1928 – October 13, 2004) was a pitcher in Major League Baseball who played for the St. Louis Browns / Baltimore Orioles (1953–1954). Listed at 5 ft 11 in (1.80 m), 190 lb., Blyzka batted and threw right-handed. He served in the U.S. Army during World War II.

In a two-season-career, Blyzka posted a 3–11 record with 58 strikeouts and a 5.58 ERA in 70 appearances, including nine start, one save, and 180⅓ innings of work.

Before the 1955 season, in the largest transaction in major league history, Baltimore sent Blyzka along Jim Fridley, Billy Hunter, Darrell Johnson, Dick Kryhoski, Don Larsen and Bob Turley to the Yankees, in exchange for Harry Byrd, Don Leppert, Jim McDonald, Bill Miller, Willy Miranda, Kal Segrist, Hal Smith, Gus Triandos, Gene Woodling and Ted Del Guercio.
