= Jim Fridley =

American baseball player (1924–2003)

- Left fielder
- Born: September 6, 1924; Philippi, West Virginia, U.S.
- Died: February 28, 2003 (aged 78); Port Charlotte, Florida, U.S.
- Batted: Right Threw: Right

MLB debut
- April 15, 1952, for the Cleveland Indians

Last MLB appearance
- September 27, 1958, for the Cincinnati Redlegs

MLB statistics
- Batting average: .248
- Home runs: 8
- Runs batted in: 53
- Stats at Baseball Reference

Teams
- Cleveland Indians (1952); Baltimore Orioles (1954); Cincinnati Redlegs (1958)

James Riley Fridley (September 6, 1924 – February 28, 2003) was an American professional baseball player. During his Major League Baseball career, he was a backup outfielder, playing mostly at left field for three different teams between 1952 and 1958. Nicknamed "Big Jim", Fridley was listed at 6 feet 2 inches (1.88 m) and 205 lb (93 kg) and batted and threw right-handed. He was born in Philippi, West Virginia.

After finishing high school, Fridley worked briefly for the FBI and later served in the U.S. Army for four years during World War II. Following his service discharge, he attended West Virginia University on a football scholarship, playing both for the WVU baseball and football teams. He was signed by the Cleveland Indians as a free agent in 1948, playing for them one year (1952) before joining the Baltimore Orioles (1954) and Cincinnati Redlegs (1958). His most productive season came in 1954, when he posted career-highs in games (85), runs (25), RBI (36) and extrabases (17).

In a three-season career, Fridley was a .248 hitter (105-for-424) with eight home runs and 53 RBI in 152 games, including 50 runs, 12 doubles, five triples, three stolen bases, and a .309 on-base percentage. In 123 outfield appearances, he posted a collective .982 fielding average (four errors in 228 chances). He also played in the minor league systems of the New York Yankees, Brooklyn Dodgers and Detroit Tigers.

Fridley died in Port Charlotte, Florida at age 78.

== On the records ==
- On April 29, 1952, Fridley went 6-for-6 for the Indians in a 21-9 rout of the Philadelphia A's at Shibe Park.
- Before the 1955 season, in the largest transaction in major league history, Baltimore sent Fridley along Mike Blyzka, Billy Hunter, Darrell Johnson, Dick Kryhoski, Don Larsen and Bob Turley to the Yankees, in exchange for Harry Byrd, Don Leppert, Jim McDonald, Bill Miller, Willy Miranda, Kal Segrist, Hal Smith, Gus Triandos, Gene Woodling and Ted Del Guercio. Del Guercio played 12 seasons in the minor leagues and was the only member of the group not to make the majors.

== See also ==
- List of Major League Baseball single-game hits leaders
