= Kal Segrist =

American baseball player (1931–2015)

- Utility player
- Born: April 14, 1931; Greenville, Texas, U.S.
- Died: June 26, 2015 (aged 84); Lubbock, Texas, U.S.
- Batted: Right Threw: Right

MLB debut
- July 16, 1952, for the New York Yankees

Last MLB appearance
- September 25, 1955, for the Baltimore Orioles

MLB statistics
- Batting average: .125
- Home runs: 0
- Runs batted in: 1
- Stats at Baseball Reference

Teams
- New York Yankees (1952); Baltimore Orioles (1955)

Kal Hill Segrist (April 14, 1931 – June 26, 2015) was an American utility infielder in Major League Baseball who played for the New York Yankees (1952) and Baltimore Orioles (1955). Listed at 6' 0", 180 lb., Segrist batted and threw right-handed. He later became a coach for the Texas Tech Red Raiders.

== Early life ==
Segrist attended W. H. Adamson High School in Dallas. He then attended the University of Texas at Austin, and played for the Texas Longhorns.

== Professional career ==
In a two-season career, Segrist was a .125 hitter (4-for-32) with four runs and one RBI in 20 games. He did not hit for any extra bases. In 17 infield appearances, he played at second base (12), third base (4) and first base (1), and posted a collective .977 fielding percentage (one error in 43 chances).

=== Trade ===
Before the 1955 season, in the largest transaction in major league history, the Yankees sent Segrist along with Harry Byrd, Don Leppert, Jim McDonald, Bill Miller, Willy Miranda, Hal Smith, Gus Triandos, Gene Woodling, and Ted Del Guercio to Baltimore in exchange for Mike Blyzka, Jim Fridley, Billy Hunter, Darrell Johnson, Dick Kryhoski, Don Larsen and Bob Turley.

== Coaching career ==
Segrist was an assistant coach for the Texas Tech Red Raiders under Berl Huffman from 1965 to 1967. He replaced Huffman as head baseball coach from 1968 to 1983.

== Personal life ==
Segrist then returned to college and received his bachelor's degree from North Texas State University in 1962. Segrist and his wife, Becky, have four children, Khris, Scott, Sunny Beth and Samuel.
