= Clint Courtney =

American baseball player (1927–1975)

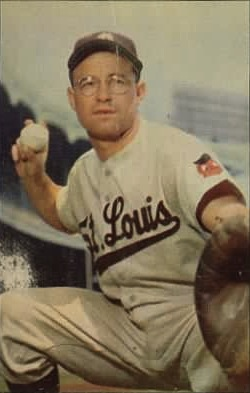
- Courtney, circa 1953
- Catcher
- Born: March 16, 1927; Hall Summit, Louisiana, U.S.
- Died: June 16, 1975 (aged 48); Rochester, New York, U.S.
- Batted: Left Threw: Right

MLB debut
- September 29, 1951, for the New York Yankees

Last MLB appearance
- June 24, 1961, for the Baltimore Orioles

MLB statistics
- Batting average: .268
- Home runs: 38
- Runs batted in: 313
- Stats at Baseball Reference

Teams
- New York Yankees (1951); St. Louis Browns / Baltimore Orioles (1952–1954); Chicago White Sox (1955); Washington Senators (1955–1959); Baltimore Orioles (1960); Kansas City Athletics (1961); Baltimore Orioles (1961)

Clinton Dawson Courtney (March 16, 1927 – June 16, 1975), nicknamed "Scrap Iron", was an American professional baseball catcher who played in Major League Baseball (MLB) for the New York Yankees (1951), St. Louis Browns / Baltimore Orioles (1952–1954, 1960, 1961), Chicago White Sox (1955), Washington Senators (1955–1959) and Kansas City Athletics (1961). He batted left-handed and threw right-handed.

Courtney was born in Louisiana, growing up there and in Arkansas. After serving in the United States Army during World War II, he was signed as a catcher by the New York Yankees. Playing minor league baseball for them for the next few seasons, he was involved in several fights. After one game with the Yankees in 1951, he was traded to the Browns in 1952 at the urging of Rogers Hornsby, St. Louis's manager. Courtney won The Sporting News American League Rookie of the Year, batting .286. Both that season and the next, he was involved in on-the-field fights with Billy Martin, whom he had battled in the minor leagues several seasons before. Courtney remained the starting catcher for the Browns when they moved to Baltimore in 1954 and became the Orioles. Then, he was traded to the White Sox.

Used as the backup to Sherm Lollar by Chicago, Courtney only lasted half a season with the White Sox before he was traded to the Senators. He finished out the 1955 season with Washington and spent the next four years there, appearing in a career-high 134 games for the ballclub in 1958. Injuries afflicted him in 1959, and he was traded back to Baltimore for the 1960 season, where he became the first catcher to wear an oversized mitt while catching knuckleball pitcher Hoyt Wilhelm. Traded to Kansas City for 1961, he was returned to Baltimore after playing one game for the Athletics. Accepting an assignment to the minor leagues halfway through the 1961 season, he played minor league ball for the next few seasons, following Oriole manager Paul Richards into the Houston Colt .45's organization.

Once his playing career ended, Courtney managed in the minor leagues, first in Houston's organization, and then for affiliates of the Atlanta Braves. He hoped to be a major league manager one day and came close to being named Atlanta's manager in 1974, though the team settled on Clyde King instead. However, while serving as the manager of the Richmond Braves in 1975, Courtney died of a heart attack while on a road trip with the team.

== Early life ==
Clinton Dawson Courtney was born on March 16, 1927, in Hall Summit, a village in tiny Red River Parish, Louisiana. His parents, C.D. and Ethel Murray Courtney, divorced when Clint was about three or four. Courtney had a sister named Fleta, as well as two stepsisters, Cecil and Jo, from his father's remarriage to Gladys Woods.

The Courtneys did not have much money. "I was so poor as a boy, my shoes were so bad that I could step on a dime and tell you if it was heads or tails," Courtney recalled in 1958. The Courtneys lived in Louisiana until Clint had completed the eighth grade, at which point they moved to Arkansas so C.D. could get a job in the oilfields. Clint attended Standard-Ulmstead High School in Smackover, where he garnered All-State recognition playing for the basketball team. He had also played baseball since his days in Halls Summit. After graduating, he joined his father working in the Smackover oilfields. He then moved to Orange, Texas, where he worked as a shipyard welder.

In 1944, Courtney was drafted by the United States Army to serve in World War II. He served initially at Fort Robinson and Fort Chaffee, playing with the latter's baseball team at the 1945 National Baseball Congress. After that, he served as part of the occupation forces in Korea, the Philippines, and Japan. Courtney continued to play baseball with service teams. Originally an outfielder, he started playing catcher during his army years. To better accomplish the position change, the left-handed Courtney taught himself to throw right-handed, which would make it easier to make a play to first base. Courtney still batted left-handed. He was discharged from the Army in 1947.

== Playing career ==
=== Early minor league career ===
Soon after his 1947 discharge, Courtney was signed to play for the New York Yankees by scout Atley Donald, another Louisiana native. He began his career with the Beaumont Exporters of the Class AA Texas League, playing four games before being assigned to the Bisbee Yanks of the Class C Arizona-Texas League. In a game against the Phoenix Senators, Courtney slid hard into second base, spiking and breaking player-manager Arky Biggs's hand. This started a small fight between the teams. Senator Billy Martin swore to target Courtney in future games whenever he got the chance. In 114 games for Bisbee, Courtney batted .319 with 71 runs scored, 136 hits, five home runs, and 80 runs batted in (RBI).

According to Rory Costello of the Society for American Baseball Research, Courtney began the 1948 season with Beaumont before being sent down to the Augusta Tigers of the Class A South Atlantic League in late April. Statistics of his time for Beaumont are not available, but in 64 games with Augusta, he batted .250 with 21 runs scored, 47 hits, 0 home runs, and 25 RBI. In July, Augusta sent him to another Yankee affiliate, the Norfolk Tars of the Class B Piedmont League. Courtney batted .229 with 22 hits and 1 home run in 29 games for the Tars.

Courtney split 1949 between two Class B teams, Norfolk and the Manchester Yankees of the New England League. In 58 games for Manchester, he batted .349 with 33 runs scored, 73 hits, 5 home runs, and 32 RBI. For Norfolk he played 48 games, batting .243 with 24 runs scored, 41 hits, 5 home runs, and 24 RBI. Over the 1949–50 offseason, Courtney played winter ball with the Guaymas Ostioneros of the Mexican Winter League, leading the league with a .371 average while also serving as the team's manager.

Back with Beaumont in 1950, Courtney was one of two players unanimously selected to the league's All-Star team. He made a positive impression on manager Rogers Hornsby, who would also manage him with the Ponce Leones in the Puerto Rican Winter League over the offseason. In 146 games, Courtney batted .263 with 137 hits, four home runs, and 79 RBI. In winter ball over the offseason, Courtney was the leading vote-getter for the All-Star Game.

Invited to spring training by the Yankees in 1951, Courtney made the team's Opening Day roster. However, shortly after the season started, he was sent down to the Kansas City Blues of the Class AAA American Association without having played. He served as Kansas City's starting catcher, playing well but drawing attention for conflicts during the year. Against the Milwaukee Brewers on June 25, he led with his elbow when sliding into second base, knocking out Johnny Logan's front teeth. Later in the season, when Kansas City played the St. Paul Saints, Courtney had a fight with Danny Ozark. He was suspended indefinitely and fined $100 after a September 3 game when he spat twice in the face of umpire John Fette and struck him with his baseball bat. In 105 games with Kansas City, Courtney batted .294 with 34 runs scored, 101 hits, eight home runs, and 35 RBI.

=== Major league career ===
==== MLB debut and trade to Browns (1951) ====
Despite his suspension, Courtney was called up by the Yankees in late September 1951. He made his major league debut on September 29, starting behind the plate for the second game of a doubleheader against the Boston Red Sox. He was hitless in two at bats, though he did reach base in the sixth inning when he was hit by a pitch from Mickey McDermott. New York won 3–1. Courtney did not play any other major league games in 1951. With his debut, Courtney likely became the first MLB catcher to wear eyeglasses during a game. (Note: Mike González may have worn them earlier during a game, but this has not been confirmed.) He had been wearing them since either his time in the military or his time in the minor leagues because he was myopic, a condition that probably resulted from his time as a welder. Courtney would use tape to keep the frames on his head as the glasses sat underneath the catcher's mask. He wore ones with shatter-proof lenses, but due to the rough nature of his position, he had broken about a dozen pairs by 1958.

After the season, on November 23, Courtney was traded to the St. Louis Browns. Yankee general manager (GM) George Weiss disliked the catcher for his on-the-field incidents. Courtney's teammate Gil McDougald thought another reason for the trade was that Martin, now in the majors with the Yankees, could not stand Courtney. Meanwhile, Hornsby, who had just been named St. Louis's manager, was excited to acquire one of his favorite players from Beaumont for his team. Four days after acquiring Courtney, the Browns traded Sherm Lollar to the White Sox, paving the way for Courtney to be their starting catcher in 1952. Baseball historian Frank Russo wrote, "In restrospect, Courtney's trade to St. Louis was the best thing that could have happened to his career."

==== Rookie season (1952) ====
Towards the end of 1952 spring training, Courtney tripped and fell during a foot race against sportswriter Milton Richman in a railway yard, and the broken glass and rocks in the yard resulted in a number of cuts. Despite the mishap, he played the next day's exhibition game covered in bandages, getting three hits against Early Wynn. Either teammate Duane Pillette or Browns announcer Buddy Blattner dubbed him "Scrap Iron", a nickname that would stick with him throughout his career and would well describe the tough, confrontational Courtney.

Courtney was the Opening Day starting catcher for the Browns. In the fourth game of the year, he had his first major league hit, a triple with the bases loaded against Bob Kennedy, helping the Browns defeat the Chicago White Sox 7–1. On May 6, he hit his first major league home run, a go-ahead, two-run blast against Bob Hooper as St. Louis beat the Philadelphia Athletics 5–1. Courtney missed 16 games from June 13 through June 28 after discovering a split finger on his right hand during a game against the Boston Red Sox on June 12. On July 12, in the second inning of a game against the Yankees, Courtney spiked Martin when he slid into second. When Courtney attempted the play again in the eighth inning, Martin hit him with the hand that had been holding the baseball. Courtney got up and tried to retaliate, which resulted in a shower of punches from Martin. A brawl ensued, during which umpire Bill Summers was knocked to the ground with a punch. Courtney was ejected from the game, but Summers allowed Martin to stay in because he thought Martin had merely been defending himself. The Yankees won 5–4 in extra innings, and Courtney was suspended three games and fined $100. He had a game-ending RBI in painful fashion on September 9, getting hit by a pitch by Ray Scarborough with the bases loaded to force in the winning run in the bottom of the ninth, as the Browns defeated the Yankees 5–4.

In 119 games as a rookie, Courtney batted .286 with 38 runs scored, 118 hits, 5 home runs, and 50 RBI. His .996 fielding percentage led American League (AL) catchers. He finished second in AL Rookie of the Year voting to Harry Byrd, also ranking 24th in AL Most Valuable Player (MVP) voting. Courtney also won The Sporting News AL Rookie of the Year award. Oscar Fraley of United Press International wrote that Courtney was "a rarity in succeeding as a freshman catcher."

==== Sophomore season, move to Baltimore (1953–1954) ====
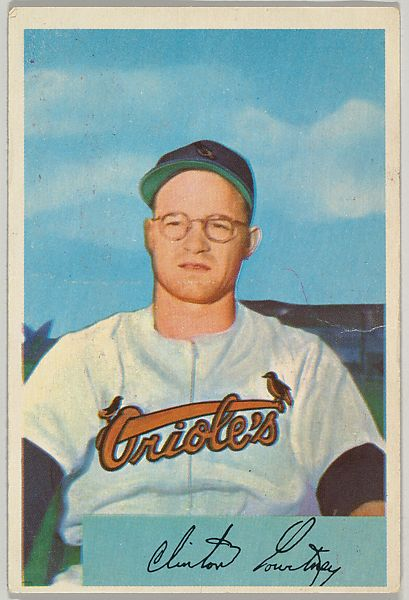
1954 Bowman card of Courtney with the Orioles

Courtney sought a $4,500 raise for 1953, which would bring his salary to $12,000. When owner Bill Veeck countered with an $11,000 offer, Courtney wrote a short letter saying, "Dear Veeck: I changed my mind. I want $14,000, not $12,000. Clint." On April 28, the Browns faced the Yankees at Sportsman's Park. In the top of the 10th inning, McDougald jarred the ball loose from Courtney at the plate, scoring a run. When the Browns were up to bat that inning, Courtney retaliated by spiking Phil Rizzuto as he tried to stretch a single into a double. Martin jumped on Courtney in a wild melee. Fans threw soda bottles onto the field, the game was paused for 17 minutes, and umpire Johnny Stevens dislocated his shoulder. Afterwards, AL president Will Harridge doled out a record $850 in fines, including $250 to Courtney alone. Courtney was involved in another fight in the third inning of the first game of a doubleheader on July 5, when Johnny Bucha of the Detroit Tigers crashed into him while trying to score. Bucha was ruled out to end the inning, but a bench-clearing brawl ensued. The Tigers ultimately won the game by a score of 10–7.

In the first game of a doubleheader on July 16, the Browns hit three successive home runs during the first inning of an 8–6 victory over the Yankees. Courtney started the feat, followed by Dick Kryhoski and Jim Dyck. This was an MLB record at the time. Courtney "produced much less with the bat" in 1953 according to Costello, who attributed the diminished performance to broken fingers suffered early in the year. In 106 games, Courtney batted .251 with 28 runs scored, 89 hits, 4 home runs, and 19 RBI. Over the offseason, he managed the Ciudad Obregón Yaquis of the Mexican Winter League, again getting selected to the All-Star Game.

Courtney remained the starting catcher in 1954, as the Browns moved to Baltimore and became the Orioles. In the first MLB game at Memorial Stadium, on April 15, Courtney hit the first home run in the stadium's history, a solo shot against Virgil Trucks in a 3–1 win over the White Sox. Against the Washington Senators on August 29, Courtney had five hits and two RBI in a 5–0 victory. In 122 games, he batted .270 with 25 runs scored, 107 hits, 4 home runs, and 37 RBI. He struck out a mere 7 times in 397 at bats (1.8 percent of the time), setting a franchise record for lowest strikeout percentage. On November 17, the Orioles made a 17-player trade with the Yankees, acquiring catchers Hal W. Smith and Gus Triandos. This made Courtney expendable, and he was traded to the White Sox on December 6. Jim Brideweser and Bob Chakales were part of the trade, which brought Baltimore Matt Batts, Don Ferrarese, Don Johnson and Fred Marsh in return.

==== White Sox and Senators (1955–1959) ====
Courtney initially held out for a higher contract from Chicago, but he agreed to a deal with the team on January 21, 1955. "This is a good club to be with — providin’ they gimme some work to do," he told reporters during spring training. However, Courtney played only 19 of the team's first 44 games, serving as the backup to Lollar. In those 19 games, he batted .378 with 7 runs scored, 14 hits, 1 home run, and 10 RBI. On June 7, he was traded to the Senators with Chakales and Johnny Groth for Jim Busby. With Washington, Courtney got the bulk of the playing time for the rest of the season. In 75 games, he batted .298 with 26 runs scored, 71 hits, 2 home runs, and 30 RBI. He played 94 games combined between Chicago and Washington, batting .209 with 33 runs scored, 85 hits, 3 home runs, and 40 RBI.

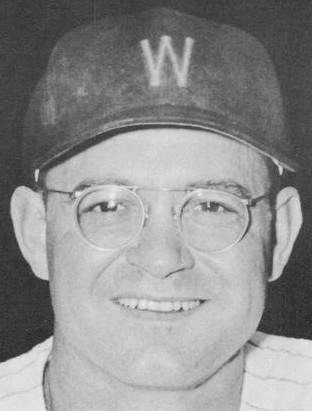
Courtney with the Senators in 1959

Catchers Courtney, Lou Berberet, and Ed Fitz Gerald all played at least 60 games for Washington in 1956, though Courtney's 101 appearances were the most of the three. He had three RBI as well as a triple on July 19 in a 5–4 victory over the Cleveland Indians. On August 5, he had three hits, two runs scored, and three RBI in a 10–4 victory over the Kansas City Athletics. His three-run home run against Bob Keegan in the first game of an August 28 doubleheader helped Washington beat the White Sox 6–2. Courtney ended the season batting .300 with 31 runs scored, 85 hits, 5 home runs, and 44 RBI.

Washington used the same trio of catchers in 1957. Fitz Gerald played only 45 games, but Berberet played slightly more than Courtney this year, 99 to 91. Courtney broke his hand on a foul tip on May 1, not playing again until May 31. Shortly after his injury, he was fined $100 by manager Chuck Dressen for "insubordination". On August 3, he had three hits, two home runs, and four RBI, though the effort came in a 13–4 loss to the Tigers. Courtney ended the season batting .267 with 23 runs scored, 62 hits, 6 home runs, and 27 RBI.

With the return of Steve Korcheck from Army service in 1958, the Senators had more than enough catchers. Rumors suggested that Courtney would be traded, but it was Berberet who was dispatched before the year. Used as the starter, Courtney set a career-high with 134 games played in 1958. Against the Tigers on September 10, he had two hits and four RBI, including a two-run home run off of Paul Foytack in the eighth inning that turned a 4–3 deficit into a 5–4 victory. Three days later, he had five RBI, including a grand slam against Ken Johnson in an 8–5 victory over Kansas City. Courtney finished the season with career highs in runs scored (46), home runs (8), and RBI (62). He batted .251 and recorded 113 hits. Defensively, he led AL catchers with 64 assists and 17 double plays turned, ranking third in the league with a .991 fielding percentage.

In February 1959, Courtney was admitted to a hospital with fears that he had suffered a heart attack, but doctors instead diagnosed him with pleurisy. During a spring training game, he collided with Smith at home plate and sustained a hairline fracture to his leg, but he missed only a few games and was ready for Opening Day. His bad luck came to a head when a bout of the mumps kept Courtney off the field until mid-May. In his absence, the Senators acquired Hal Naragon, who split catching duties with Courtney for the rest of the year. Courtney had four three-hit games during the year but never recorded more than two RBI all season. In 72 games, he batted .233 with 19 runs scored, 44 hits, 2 home runs, and 18 RBI.

==== Catching the knuckleball, final MLB season (1960–1961) ====
During spring training in 1960, Courtney was traded back to the Orioles, along with Ron Samford, as the Senators acquired Billy Gardner. The trade upset Oriole fans, who liked Gardner. "Ah got a hunch Ah’ll play more than a lot of people think. Ah can hit and Ah ain’t as bad a catcher as a lot of people think," Courtney responded to criticisms. Though Triandos was the main catcher for the Orioles, he was on the disabled list part of the year with a sore thumb, giving Courtney more playing time.

Courtney also made history catching knuckleball pitcher Hoyt Wilhelm. The unpredictable nature of a knuckleball made it notoriously difficult not just to hit but to catch, and catchers often allowed passed balls when Wilhelm was throwing. Baltimore manager Paul Richards had been trying since the previous season to help his catchers deal with Wilhelm's pitches, and in 1960, he decided to have his catchers try wearing an oversized mitt. The glove, nicknamed "Big Bertha", was 42 inches in circumference and weighed 30 ounces; most gloves were only 33–34 inches in circumference and weighed just 27 ounces, for comparison. (Note: There were no official measurements for gloves at the time.) On May 27, Courtney became the first catcher to wear the oversized mitt when he caught Wilhelm in a game against the Yankees. Baltimore won 3–2, and there were no passed balls. Courtney liked the glove but still found Wilhelm challenging. "Boy is he rough to catch. I don’t see how anybody ever hits him." The glove did not solve all problems with catching the knuckleball; in the first game of a doubleheader against Detroit on June 19, while catching Wilhelm, Courtney was twice called for catcher's interference. Against the Yankees again on August 15, Courtney dropped a foul pop up hit by Mickey Mantle, who then hit a two-run home run to defeat Baltimore. Still, the mitt was legal until the end of 1964, when MLB's Rules Committee declared 38 inches to be the maximum size for a mitt.

During the 1960 season, Courtney struggled to throw the ball from home plate back to the pitcher, often having to resort to throwing the ball to the third baseman to relay or walking the ball part of the way back to the pitcher. This condition was short-lived. Courtney appeared in 83 games for the Orioles in 1960, batting .227 with 14 runs scored, 35 hits, 1 home run, and 12 RBI.

On January 21, 1961, Courtney was traded to Kansas City with Jim Archer, Bob Boyd, Wayne Causey, and Al Pilarcik for Whitey Herzog and Russ Snyder. He made one appearance for Kansas City, pinch-hitting for Haywood Sullivan in a 5–3 loss to the Yankees in the first game of an April 15 doubleheader, before the Athletics returned him to Baltimore the same day. With Baltimore, he again backed up Triandos. Courtney played his last game for the Orioles on June 24, pinch-hitting for Marv Breeding in a 4–1 loss to the Los Angeles Angels. On July 1, the Orioles demoted Courtney to the Rochester Red Wings, who were in need of catching help. "You don’t have to go back to the minors if you don’t want to, but if you did you’d be doing the organization a big favor," pleaded Richards. Richards also made a promise that wherever he was employed, Courtney would be able to catch. Courtney did go, playing 30 games for the Red Wings for the rest of the season. He batted .217 with 5 runs scored, 13 hits, 0 home runs, and 4 RBI. In 22 games for Baltimore, he had batted .267 with 3 runs scored, 12 hits, 0 home runs, and 4 RBI.

=== Career statistics and playing style ===
In an 11-season career, Courtney was a .268 hitter with 260 runs scored, 750 hits, 38 home runs, and 313 RBI in 946 games. As a catcher, he recorded 3,556 putouts with 379 assists and only 50 errors in 3,985 chances for a .987 fielding percentage. He also had a 41% caught stealing percentage, throwing out 198 of 478 would-be base stealers. Richards thought Courtney was underrated as a catcher. "You know, Courtney is about three times better a catcher than anyone has ever given him for being. He hops around out there, but he gets the job done. He’s one of the fellows who doesn’t mind winning." Courtney had a reputation for "burning" the ball back to the pitchers when he returned it to the mound.

When Courtney was with the Browns, he would hold his glove in the center of the plate as pitchers were throwing. Ned Garver noted that Lollar and Les Moss, other Browns catchers, had moved the glove to the part of the plate where Garver wished to throw the ball. "So when Courtney always held his glove in the middle of the plate, it made it harder for me," Garver observed. Courtney held the glove in this manner on instruction from Hornsby, who theorized that "the pitchers will miss it enough that they will hit the edge of the plate a lot of the time." When Hornsby was not managing him, Courtney apparently was more likely to set up the pitch location; biographer Costello called him "an expert framer of pitches."

=== Later minor league career ===
MLB expanded by creating two new franchises for the 1962 season, and Richards becoming the general manager of the Houston Colt .45's. He kept his promise by acquiring Courtney from the Orioles. Courtney competed for the major league club but was cut in April. Initially, he was assigned to the Triple-A Oklahoma City 89ers of the American Association. After just three games with them, he was sent to the Durham Bulls of the Class B Carolina League, where manager Lou Fitzgerald wanted a veteran around to help the team's catchers. In 81 games for the Bulls, Courtney batted .246 with 37 runs scored, 61 hits, 9 home runs, and 57 RBI.

As his career neared its end, Courtney developed a new goal: to become an MLB manager. He split 1963 between Durham and the Texas League's San Antonio Bullets, serving as a player and coach at both destinations. In 23 games for San Antonio, he batted .250 with 5 runs scored, 10 hits, 2 home runs, and 9 RBI. He played 38 games for Durham, batting .212 with 14 runs scored, 24 hits, 6 home runs, and 20 RBI. At San Antonio, he worked with Jerry Grote, a similar-type player who would go on to spend 16 seasons in the major leagues.

Courtney finished his playing career in 1964 as a player-coach with San Antonio, where he served as the backup catcher to Dave Adlesh. In 37 games, Courtney batted .324 with 1 run scored, 12 hits, 0 home runs, and 3 RBI. Over 30 years later, David King of The San Antonio Express-News called Courtney the "heart" of the Bullets, going on to discuss how his work ethic and simple approach to the game influenced the team.

== Coaching career ==
In 1965, Courtney returned to the major leagues as the bullpen coach for Houston, their first season under the name Astros and their first year in the indoor Astrodome. After the season, Richards and the entire Astro coaching staff were fired. Hired by the Atlanta Braves in 1967, Richards reemployed Courtney as a travelling catching instructor for Atlanta's minor league teams.

After just over three years of instructing minor league catchers, Courtney got a chance to manage again in 1970, when he replaced Fitzgerald as manager of the struggling Shreveport Braves of the Texas League. The move was supposed to be temporary, enabling Courtney to be near his ill father and brother-in-law. His relatives' health improved, however, and Courtney held the position for the rest of the year as Shreveport posted a 58–76 record overall. In 1971, he managed the Greenwood Braves of the Class A Western Carolina League, helping the team post the best record in the league, at 85–38. "Clint ‘Scraps’ Courtney is a man who means what he says and doesn't beat around the bush getting the job done,” opined Jim Joyce of The Greenwood Index-Journal.

Courtney managed the Savannah Braves of the Class AA Southern League in 1972, guiding them to an 80–59 record. He began 1973 with them but was promoted in June to manage the Richmond Braves of the Class AAA International League, Atlanta's top minor league affiliate. Richmond finished 1973 with a 53–93 record but went 75–65 in 1974. When Eddie Mathews was fired as Atlanta's manager in July 1974, Courtney was prominently mentioned as a possible successor to Eddie Mathews to manage the Braves. The job instead went to Clyde King, and Courtney continued to manage Richmond. Nevertheless, Courtney figured that his dreams of managing a major league team would soon be realized.

== Personal life ==
Courtney married St. Louis's Dorothy Knelange in Ciudad Obregón on January 11, 1954. The couple had five children: Wendell, Cynthia, Kathleen, Nancy, and Stephen. During his career, Courtney owned a 200-acre ranch in Coushatta, Louisiana, renting up to 500 more acres at times as well. "I aim to own my own land ‘n’ all the cattle I can git," he told sportswriter Bob Broeg in 1953. He grew over 10,000 peppers, eggplants, and tomato vines in greenhouses, also taking care of Thoroughbred racehorses on his property. He had a country boy reputation; teammate Dick Hall quipped that riding in the same vehicle as him was "like being in a barn". Courtney was listed at 5 ft 8 in (1.73 m) and 180 pounds (82 kg). Despite his tough reputation during games, his temperament was more genial and affable off the field.

== Death ==
On June 15, 1975, while on a road trip with Richmond to play the Rochester Red Wings, Courtney was playing ping pong and discussing baseball with some of his players when he suffered a heart attack. The attack proved fatal, and Courtney died at the age of 48. He was buried in Plot N of the Mount Zion Cemetery in Hall Summit, Louisiana. Bob Lemon replaced him as the manager of Richmond, which finished the 1975 season with a 62–75 record.
