= Leppert =

Leppert is a surname. Notable people with the surname include:

- Don Leppert (1931–2023), American baseball player and coach
- Don Leppert (1930–2021), American baseball player
- Tammy Lynn Leppert (born 1965), American actress and model who went missing in 1983
- Tom Leppert (born 1954), American businessman and politician
