= 1955 Cleveland Indians season =

1955 Cleveland Indians
- League: American League
- Ballpark: Cleveland Municipal Stadium
- City: Cleveland, Ohio
- Owners: Myron H. Wilson
- General managers: Hank Greenberg
- Managers: Al López
- Television: WXEL (Ken Coleman, Jim Britt)
- Radio: WERE (Jimmy Dudley, Ed Edwards)

The 1955 Cleveland Indians season was the 55th season in franchise history. The team finished second in the American League with a record of 93–61, three games behind the New York Yankees.

== Offseason ==
- October 14, 1954: Owen Friend was purchased from the Indians by the Boston Red Sox.
- November 16, 1954: Ralph Kiner was acquired by the Indians from the Chicago Cubs for $60,000 as part of an earlier deal (the Cubs sent a player to be named later to the Indians for Sam Jones and players to be named later) made on September 30, 1954. The Indians sent Gale Wade to the Cubs on November 30 to complete the trade.
- Prior to 1955 season: Joe Ginsberg was sent by the Indians to the San Diego Padres.

== Regular season ==
=== Season standings ===
American League
Team	W	L	Pct.	GB	Home	Road
New York Yankees	96	58	.623	—	52‍–‍25	44‍–‍33
Cleveland Indians	93	61	.604	3	49‍–‍28	44‍–‍33
Chicago White Sox	91	63	.591	5	49‍–‍28	42‍–‍35
Boston Red Sox	84	70	.545	12	47‍–‍31	37‍–‍39
Detroit Tigers	79	75	.513	17	46‍–‍31	33‍–‍44
Kansas City Athletics	63	91	.409	33	33‍–‍43	30‍–‍48
Baltimore Orioles	57	97	.370	39	30‍–‍47	27‍–‍50
Washington Senators	53	101	.344	43	28‍–‍49	25‍–‍52

=== Record vs. opponents ===
1955 American League record Sources:
Team	BAL	BOS	CWS	CLE	DET	KCA	NYY	WSH
Baltimore	—	8–14	10–12–1	3–19	9–13	10–12–1	3–19	14–8
Boston	14–8	—	9–13	11–11	13–9	14–8	8–14	15–7
Chicago	12–10–1	13–9	—	10–12	14–8	14–8	11–11	17–5
Cleveland	19–3	11–11	12–10	—	12–10	17–5	13–9	9–13
Detroit	13–9	9–13	8–14	10–12	—	12–10	10–12	17–5
Kansas City	12–10–1	8–14	8–14	5–17	10–12	—	7–15	13–9
New York	19–3	14–8	11–11	9–13	12–10	15–7	—	16–6
Washington	8–14	7–15	5–17	13–9	5–17	9–13	6–16	—

=== Notable transactions ===
- May 16, 1955: Hal Newhouser was released by the Indians.
- June 15, 1955: Dave Pope and Wally Westlake were traded by the Indians to the Baltimore Orioles for Billy Cox and Gene Woodling. Billy Cox refused to report to his new team. The Orioles sent $15,000 to the Indians on June 15 as compensation.
- July 2, 1955: Dave Philley was selected off waivers from the Indians by the Baltimore Orioles.

=== Roster ===
1955 Cleveland Indians
Roster
Pitchers: 22 Hank Aguirre; 28 Bud Daley; 19 Bob Feller; 25 Mike Garcia; 33 Ted Gray; 11 Art Houtteman; 21 Bob Lemon; 26 Sal Maglie; 12 Don Mossi; 20 Ray Narleski; 16 Hal Newhouser; 51,34 José Santiago; 27 Herb Score; 30 Bill Wight; 24 Early Wynn	Catchers: 15 Hank Foiles; 4 Jim Hegan; 18 Hal Naragon; Infielders: 45,6 Joe Altobelli; 1 Bobby Ávila; 36 Sam Dente; 33 Ferris Fain; 37 Billy Harrell; 8 Kenny Kuhn; 5 Hank Majeski; 3 Dale Mitchell; 35 Stan Pawloski; 8 Rudy Regalado; 7 Al Rosen; 2 George Strickland; 23 Vic Wertz; 5 Bobby Young	Outfielders: 38 Rocky Colavito; 14 Larry Doby; 30 Hoot Evers; 9 Ralph Kiner; 32 Stu Locklin; 17 Dave Philley; 34 Dave Pope; 32,16 Al Smith; 31 Wally Westlake; 31 Gene Woodling; Other batters: 37 Harry Simpson	Manager: 10 Al López; Coaches: 44 Tony Cuccinello (Third Base); 43 Mel Harder (Pitching); 42 Red Kress (First Base); 40 Bill Lobe (Bullpen)

== Player stats ==
=== Batting ===
==== Starters by position ====
Note: Pos = Position; G = Games played; AB = At bats; H = Hits; Avg. = Batting average; HR = Home runs; RBI = Runs batted in

Pos	Player	G	AB	H	Avg.	HR	RBI
C	Jim Hegan	116	304	67	.220	9	40
1B	Vic Wertz	74	257	65	.253	14	55
2B	Bobby Avila	141	537	146	.272	13	61
SS	George Strickland	130	388	81	.209	2	34
3B	Al Rosen	139	492	120	.244	21	81
LF	Ralph Kiner	113	321	78	.243	18	54
CF	Larry Doby	131	491	143	.291	26	75
RF	Al Smith	154	607	186	.306	22	77

==== Other batters ====
Note: G = Games played; AB = At bats; H = Hits; Avg. = Batting average; HR = Home runs; RBI = Runs batted in

Player	G	AB	H	Avg.	HR	RBI
Gene Woodling	79	259	72	.278	5	35
Hal Naragon	57	127	41	.323	1	14
Ferris Fain	56	118	30	.254	0	8
Hank Foiles	62	111	29	.261	1	7
Sam Dente	73	105	27	.257	0	10
Dave Pope	35	104	31	.298	6	22
Dave Philley	43	104	31	.298	2	9
Joe Altobelli	42	75	15	.200	2	5
Hoot Evers	39	66	19	.288	2	9
Dale Mitchell	61	58	15	.259	0	10
Hank Majeski	36	48	9	.188	2	6
Bobby Young	18	45	14	.311	0	6
Rudy Regalado	10	26	7	.269	0	5
Wally Westlake	16	20	5	.250	0	1
Billy Harrell	13	19	8	.421	0	1
Stu Locklin	16	18	3	.167	0	0
Rocky Colavito	5	9	4	.444	0	0
Stan Pawloski	2	8	1	.125	0	0
Kenny Kuhn	4	6	2	.333	0	0
Harry Simpson	3	1	0	.000	0	0

=== Pitching ===
= Indicates league leader

==== Starting pitchers ====
Note: G = Games pitched; IP = Innings pitched; W = Wins; L = Losses; ERA = Earned run average; SO = Strikeouts

Player	G	IP	W	L	ERA	SO
Early Wynn	32	230.0	17	11	2.82	122
Herb Score	33	227.1	16	10	2.85	245
Bob Lemon	35	211.1	18*	10	3.88	100
Mike Garcia	38	210.2	11	13	4.02	120

- Tied with Whitey Ford and Frank Sullivan

==== Other pitchers ====
Note: G = Games pitched; IP = Innings pitched; W = Wins; L = Losses; ERA = Earned run average; SO = Strikeouts

Player	G	IP	W	L	ERA	SO
Art Houtteman	35	124.1	10	6	3.98	53
Bob Feller	25	83.0	4	4	3.47	25
Sal Maglie	10	25.2	0	2	3.86	11
Hank Aguirre	4	12.2	2	0	1.42	6
Bud Daley	2	7.0	0	1	6.43	2

==== Relief pitchers ====
Note: G = Games pitched; W = Wins; L = Losses; SV = Saves; ERA = Earned run average; SO = Strikeouts

Player	G	W	L	SV	ERA	SO
Ray Narleski	60	9	1	19	3.71	94
Don Mossi	57	4	3	9	2.42	69
José Santiago	17	2	0	0	2.48	19
Bill Wight	17	0	0	1	2.63	9
Hal Newhouser	2	0	0	0	0.00	1
Ted Gray	2	0	0	0	18.00	1

== Awards and honors ==
All-Star Game

- Bobby Ávila, Second base, Reserve
- Larry Doby, Outfield, Reserve
- Al López, Manager
- Al Rosen, Third base, Reserve
- Herb Score, Pitcher, Reserve
- Al Smith, Outfield, Reserve
- Early Wynn, Pitcher, Reserve

== Farm system ==
Level	Team	League	Manager
AAA	Indianapolis Indians	American Association	Kerby Farrell
AA	Tulsa Oilers	Texas League	L. D. Meyer and Hank Schenz
A	Reading Indians	Eastern League	Jo-Jo White
B	Keokuk Kernels	Illinois–Indiana–Iowa League	Pinky May
B	Spartanburg Peaches	Tri-State League	Spud Chandler
C	Fargo-Moorhead Twins	Northern League	Phil Seghi and Paul O'Dea
C	Sherbrooke Indians	Provincial League	Ed Hartness
D	Vidalia Indians	Georgia State League	Ed Levy
D	Lafayette Chiefs	Mississippi–Ohio Valley League	Mark Wylie

LEAGUE CHAMPIONS: Keokuk, Spartanburg
