= Tom Gastall =

American baseball player (1932–1956)

- Catcher
- Born: June 13, 1932; Fall River, Massachusetts, U.S.
- Died: September 20, 1956 (aged 24); Riviera Beach, Maryland, U.S.
- Batted: Right Threw: Right

MLB debut
- June 21, 1955, for the Baltimore Orioles

Last MLB appearance
- September 19, 1956, for the Baltimore Orioles

MLB statistics
- Batting average: .181
- Home runs: 0
- Runs batted in: 4
- Stats at Baseball Reference

Teams
- Baltimore Orioles (1955–1956)

Thomas Everett Gastall (June 13, 1932 – September 20, 1956) was an American professional baseball player who spent two years in Major League Baseball (MLB) as a catcher with the Baltimore Orioles in 1955 and 1956. A right-handed batter and thrower, he stood 6 feet 2 inches (1.88 m) tall and weighed 187 pounds (85 kg).

Gastall was born in Fall River, Massachusetts. He graduated in 1951 from B.M.C. Durfee High School where he starred in baseball, football and basketball. He matriculated at Boston University where he served as captain of the baseball and basketball teams, and quarterbacked the Terriers to the most successful season in their history to that point. The university's Athlete of the Year as a senior in 1955, also the year that he died, he was posthumously inducted into the Boston University Athletic Hall of Fame in 1959. He was the 120th selection in the tenth round of the 1955 NFL draft by the Detroit Lions.

After graduation, Gastall signed with Baltimore for $40,000 as a bonus baby. He was the third-string catcher behind starter Gus Triandos and Hal Smith on the Orioles' depth chart. Gastall appeared in 52 games and had less than one hundred plate appearances over two seasons with Baltimore.

He died when the ERCO Ercoupe aircraft he piloted experienced engine problems and crashed into the Chesapeake Bay on September 20, 1956. He had taken off in the airplane from Easton, Maryland at around 6 p.m. ET. He radioed the control tower at Harbor Field at 6:12 p.m., reporting that he was in trouble and, in what might have been his last words, "heading for the water." Radio noise prevented the operator at the control tower from hearing any further details from Gastall. His body was found floating off Riviera Beach, Maryland five days later on September 25. Autopsy results announced on September 27 revealed that Gastall had escaped the wreckage with no signs of injury from the crash but died because of drowning. He was survived by his wife, Rosemary, and a son, Thomas.

== See also ==
- List of baseball players who died during their careers
