= Dave Pope =

American baseball player (1921–1999)

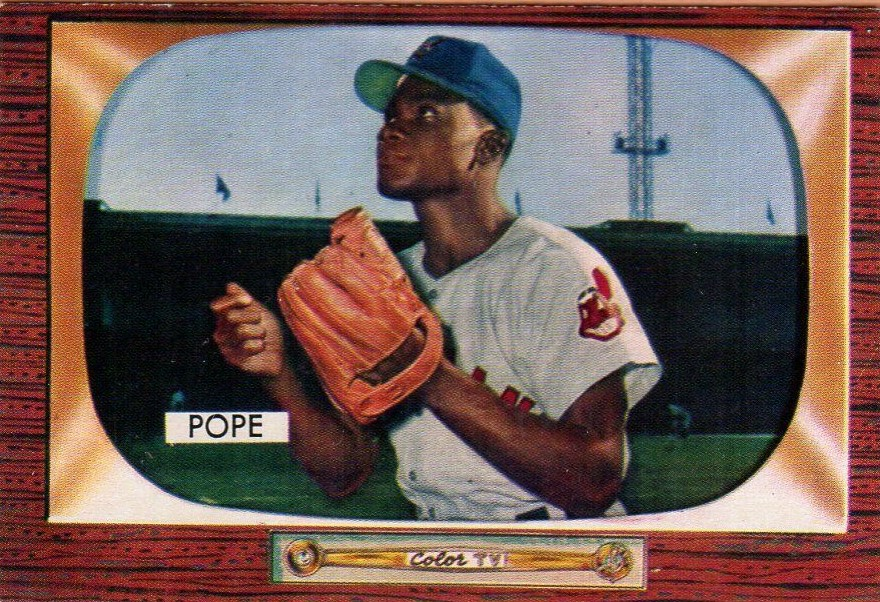
- Outfielder
- Born: June 17, 1921; Talladega, Alabama, U.S.
- Died: August 28, 1999 (aged 78); Cleveland, Ohio, U.S.
- Batted: Left Threw: Right

Professional debut
- NgL: 1946, for the Homestead Grays
- MLB: July 1, 1952, for the Cleveland Indians

Last MLB appearance
- September 30, 1956, for the Cleveland Indians

MLB statistics
- Batting average: .265
- Home runs: 12
- Runs batted in: 73
- Stats at Baseball Reference

Teams
- Negro leagues: Homestead Grays (1946); Major League Baseball: Cleveland Indians (1952, 1954–1955, 1956); Baltimore Orioles (1955–1956)
Military career
Allegiance	United States
Branch	United States Army
Service years	1943–1946

David Pope (June 17, 1921 – August 28, 1999) was an American Negro league and Major League Baseball outfielder who played one inning for the Homestead Grays and for four seasons in MLB for the Cleveland Indians in 1952, and from 1954 to 1955. He then played for the Baltimore Orioles after being traded from 1955 to 1956, then was traded back to Cleveland for the remainder of the 1956 season. He left MLB behind on September 30, 1956.

== Early life ==
Pope, the son of Jackson and Mary Pope, was one of eleven siblings. His older brother Willie Pope was a notable Negro league baseball player for the Homestead Grays and Pittsburgh Crawfords. Pope served in the US Army from 1943 until 1946, at Camp Lee in Virginia.

== Baseball career ==
Pope joined the Homestead Grays of the Negro National League after his Army discharge in 1946, but only played one inning in right field and never had a turn at the plate. He then played for the minor league United States League's Pittsburgh Crawfords and other independent Negro league teams. In 1950, he was signed by Major League Baseball's Cleveland Indians and debuted with them in 1952.

Although his major league career spanned roughly four years, Pope has a place in the photo and film archive for Game 1 of the 1954 World Series, as part of a play which contrasted with Willie Mays's famous catch. In the top of the 8th inning, Vic Wertz of Cleveland had hit a deep fly ball (400 or more feet) to center field which had been pulled down by Mays for a very long out. In the last of the 10th inning, Giants' pinch-hitter Dusty Rhodes hit a shallow fly ball, well under 300 feet, toward the cozy right field area of the Polo Grounds. Pope, who had been brought into the game in the late innings, ran over and leaped as high as he could but was a couple of feet short of being able to catch Rhodes' fly ball, which landed in the first row of seats for the game-winning home run.

Pope was acquired along with Wally Westlake and cash by the Baltimore Orioles from the Indians for Gene Woodling and Billy Cox before the trade deadline on June 15, 1955. His 1956 Topps baseball card for the Orioles gave him some vicarious redemption for that failed leap in 1954: It included a colorized drawing based on the black-and-white picture, but with the ball in his glove.

In 1141.2 innings playing at all three outfield positions, Pope recorded a .990 fielding percentage, committing only 3 errors in 315 total chances.

== Family and death ==
Pope died in Cleveland, Ohio in 1999 and was buried at Lake View Cemetery in the same city.

Pope's daughter, Linda is an ophthalmologist in Houston, Texas and her son, Pope's grandson, David Pegram, performed in the 2011 Tony Award Winner for Best Play, "War Horse."

== See also ==
- List of Negro league baseball players who played in Major League Baseball
