= Willie Pope =

American baseball player

- Pitcher
- Born: December 14, 1918; Birmingham, Alabama, U.S.
- Died: June 10, 2010 (aged 91); O'Hara Township, Pennsylvania, U.S.
- Batted: Left Threw: Right

Negro league baseball debut
- 1946, for the Pittsburgh Crawfords

Last appearance
- 1948, for the Homestead Grays

Teams
- Pittsburgh Crawfords (1946); Homestead Grays (1947–1948)

William Robert Pope (December 14, 1918 – June 10, 2010), nicknamed "Wee Willie", was an American Negro league pitcher for the Pittsburgh Crawfords and Homestead Grays between 1946 and 1948.

A native of Birmingham, Alabama, Pope was the brother of major leaguer Dave Pope, and served in the US Army during World War II. After one year with Pittsburgh, he joined the Homestead Grays. Pope tossed a no-hitter for the Grays in 1947 against the New York Cubans, and was a member of the Grays' 1948 Negro World Series championship club, recording a key triple during the series against the Birmingham Black Barons.

Pope died in O'Hara Township, Pennsylvania in 2010 at age 91.
