= Jim Pyburn =

American baseball player (1932–2011)

- Outfielder/Third baseman
- Born: November 1, 1932; Fairfield, Alabama, U.S.
- Died: May 21, 2011 (aged 78); Jasper, Alabama, U.S.
- Batted: Right Threw: Right

MLB debut
- April 17, 1955, for the Baltimore Orioles

Last MLB appearance
- June 16, 1957, for the Baltimore Orioles

MLB statistics
- Batting average: .190
- Home runs: 3
- Runs batted in: 20
- Stats at Baseball Reference

Teams
- Baltimore Orioles (1955–1957)

James Edward Pyburn (November 1, 1932 – May 21, 2011) was an American professional baseball player. An outfielder and third baseman, Pyburn appeared in 158 Major League Baseball games over three seasons (1955–57) for the Baltimore Orioles. Pyburn threw and batted right-handed, stood 6 feet (1.8 m) tall and weighed 190 pounds (86 kg).

Pyburn was born in Birmingham, Alabama, and attended Ensley High School. He signed with the Orioles for a reported $30,000 bonus after starring in baseball and football at Auburn University. As a "bonus baby," Pyburn had to be kept on Baltimore's 25-man Major League roster for the first two years of his professional career. Initially a third baseman, he was abruptly shifted to the outfield by Baltimore GM/field manager Paul Richards. In 1956, his sophomore season for the Orioles, Pyburn appeared in a career-high 84 games, 64 in center field, but he batted only .173 in 156 at bats. He was sent to minor league baseball during the middle of the 1957 season and retired from professional baseball after the 1958 season. All told, Pyburn collected 56 hits in 294 MLB at bats, including five doubles and five triples.

== Football coaching career ==
Pyburn played offensive end for the Auburn Tigers football squad in 1953–54, and set a school record for most receiving yards in a season. He was drafted in the 18th round of the 1956 NFL draft by the Washington Redskins. After his retirement from baseball, Pyburn returned to football and became a coach at the college level. A longtime associate of Vince Dooley at Auburn and the University of Georgia, Pyburn served as an assistant coach at Georgia (1964–79), coaching defensive line, linebackers and defensive backfield over that timeframe. After a temporary retirement, Pyburn briefly revived his coaching career as the defensive coordinator at Abilene Christian University (1985–86).

A member of the Alabama Sports Hall of Fame (inducted in 2000), he died at age 78 after a period of struggle with Alzheimer's disease. He was a member of the Church of Christ and served as an elder at the Woodland Trace congregation in Jasper, Alabama.
