= Roger Marquis =

American baseball player (1937–2004)

- Right fielder
- Born: April 5, 1937; Holyoke, Massachusetts, U.S.
- Died: July 19, 2004 (aged 67); Holyoke, Massachusetts, U.S.
- Batted: Left Threw: Left

MLB debut
- September 25, 1955, for the Baltimore Orioles

Last MLB appearance
- September 25, 1955, for the Baltimore Orioles

MLB statistics
- Games played: 1
- At bats: 1
- Hits: 0
- Stats at Baseball Reference

Teams
- Baltimore Orioles (1955)

Roger Julian Marquis (April 5, 1937 – July 19, 2004) was an American professional baseball player who appeared in one Major League Baseball game and registered one at bat with the 1955 Baltimore Orioles. The native of Holyoke, Massachusetts, threw and batted left-handed, stood 6 feet (1.8 m) tall and weighed 190 pounds (86 kg).

Marquis signed his first baseball contract with the Orioles on September 2, 1955, and his first professional appearance came at the Major League level 23 days later. On September 25 at Griffith Stadium against the Washington Senators, Marquis replaced fellow Massachusetts-born rookie Angelo Dagres as the Orioles' right fielder in the eighth inning. He had no chances in the field during his one inning of play, then grounded out against Washington's Bob Chakales in the top of the ninth frame. Veteran Cal Abrams then took Marquis' place as the right fielder in the Baltimore lineup.

Sent to the lower reaches of Baltimore's minor league system in both 1956 and 1957 to gain playing experience, Marquis batted only .225 at the Class D level, and was shifted to first baseman and then southpaw pitcher (compiling a 2–2 record), before leaving baseball at the end of the 1957 season at the age of 20.

He died at 67 in Holyoke in 2004.
