= Tex Nelson =

American baseball player

- Outfielder
- Born: August 9, 1936; Dallas, Texas, U.S.
- Died: July 22, 2011 (aged 74); Mesquite, Texas, U.S.
- Batted: Left Threw: Left

MLB debut
- June 22, 1955, for the Baltimore Orioles

Last MLB appearance
- June 14, 1957, for the Baltimore Orioles

MLB statistics
- Batting average: .205
- Home runs: 0
- Runs batted in: 11

Teams
- Baltimore Orioles (1955–1957)

Robert Sidney Nelson (August 7, 1936 – July 22, 2011) was an American outfielder in Major League Baseball. Listed at 6' 3" (1.91 m), 205 lb. (93 kg), he batted and threw left-handed.

Born in Dallas, Texas, Nelson was signed by the Baltimore Orioles to a bonus contract in 1955 and, because of the bonus rules then in force, was forced to spend his first professional season on the Orioles' major league roster. From 1955 through 1957 he appeared in only 79 games because of his limited experience, and never fulfilled his potential.

Nelson was a natural athlete and member of the State Champion Adamson High School baseball team, where he had been known as the "Babe Ruth of Texas." One time Dizzy Dean visited one of their games and thrilled Nelson by telling him, "Son, I ain't never seen a baseball hit that hard or that far!"

He joined the Orioles directly after graduating from Adamson High School in 1955, where he got his nickname ″Tex″ from his roommate, Brooks Robinson. He was with the organization for nine years until injuries forced his retirement. Although Nelson connected for 29 and 21 home runs in his later minor league baseball career, both times in the Class B Northwest League, he never hit a home run in the majors.

Altogether, Nelson played in 79 games for the Orioles between 1955 and 1957, collecting 25 hits in 122 at-bats for a .205 average, including two doubles and two triples, while driving in 11 runs and scoring 11 times.

Following his major league stint, Nelson played in the minors through the 1961 season. He returned to Dallas and went to work for ETMF/ABF trucking industry, where he retired after 30 years. He also enjoyed being a troop scoutmaster for the Boy Scouts and singing with the Champion Award-winning 160 voice barbershop chorus, The Vocal Majority.

Nelson died in Mesquite, Texas, at the age of 74.

== See also ==
- List of baseball players who went directly to Major League Baseball
