= Frank Leja =

American baseball player (1936–1991)

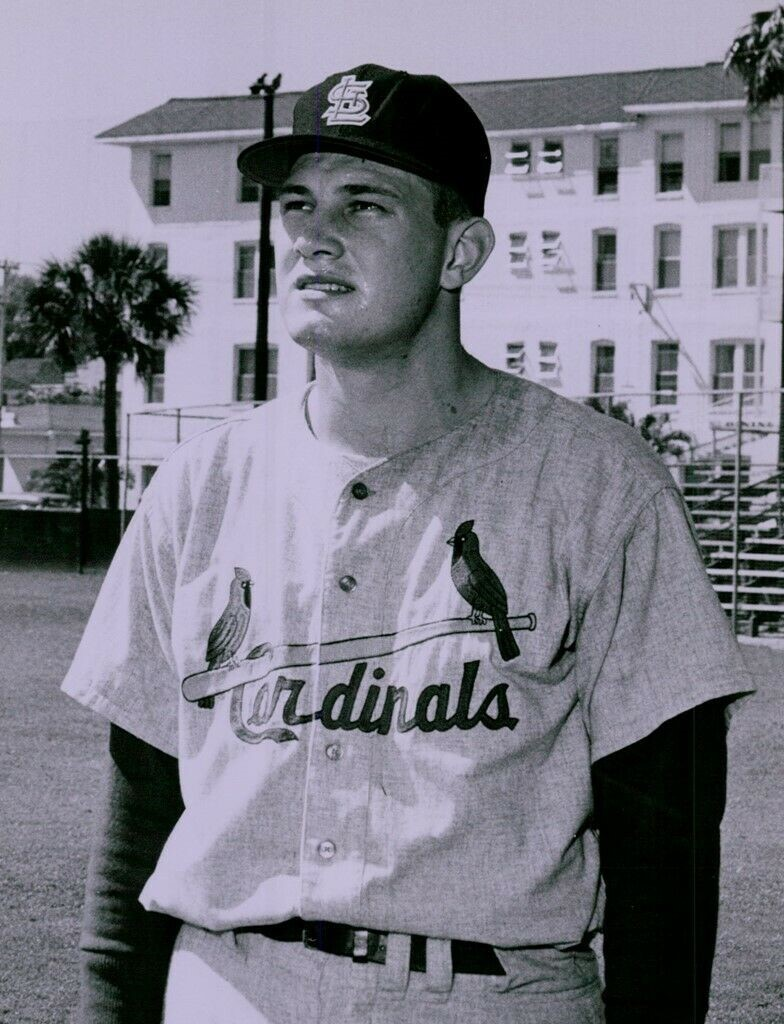
- First baseman
- Born: February 7, 1936; Holyoke, Massachusetts, U.S.
- Died: May 3, 1991 (aged 55); Boston, Massachusetts, U.S.
- Batted: Left Threw: Left

MLB debut
- May 1, 1954, for the New York Yankees

Last MLB appearance
- April 29, 1962, for the Los Angeles Angels

MLB statistics
- Batting average: .043
- Home runs: 0
- Runs batted in: 0
- Stats at Baseball Reference

Teams
- New York Yankees (1954–1955); Los Angeles Angels (1962)

Frank John Leja Jr. (February 7, 1936 – May 3, 1991) was an American professional baseball player. The first baseman appeared in a total of 26 games with the New York Yankees (1954–55) and Los Angeles Angels (1962) of Major League Baseball.

He threw and batted left-handed, stood 6 feet 4 inches (1.93 m) tall and weighed 205 pounds (93 kg).

A native of Holyoke, Massachusetts, who starred at Holyoke High School, Leja was signed to a $45,000 bonus contract by legendary Yankee scout Paul Krichell. As a "bonus baby", the 18-year-old Leja was forced by the regulations of the day to spend the first two seasons of his professional baseball career on a Major League roster. He appeared in only 19 total games during the 1954 and 1955 seasons, with seven plate appearances and seven at bats. Leja's lone career MLB hit was a single off Al Sima of the Philadelphia Athletics on September 19, 1954, in the Athletics' final game at Connie Mack Stadium before the team moved to Kansas City.

After finally being allowed to play regularly in minor league baseball, Leja showed his ability as a strong power hitter, exceeding the 20-home run mark from 1957 to 1959 and again in 1961, however, the Yankees never recalled him, then traded him to the St. Louis Cardinals after the 1961 season.

The Angels, in their second season as an American League expansion team, then purchased Leja's contract during spring training in 1962, where he made the team's early-season 28-man roster and appeared in seven more games, including four starts at first base, although going hitless (with just one base on balls) in 16 at bats. Leja's 1954 single was his only MLB hit in 23 official at bats, although he scored three runs.

He was traded to the Milwaukee Braves in May 1962 and finished his career in the minor leagues in 1963 with the Triple-A Toronto Maple Leafs of the International League.

Leja died of a heart attack in Boston at age 55 and was interred in Greenlawn Cemetery in suburban Nahant, Massachusetts.
