= Angelo Dagres =

American baseball player (1934–2017)

- Outfielder
- Born: August 22, 1934; Newburyport, Massachusetts, U.S.
- Died: December 23, 2017 (aged 83); Rowley, Massachusetts, U.S.
- Batted: Left Threw: Left

MLB debut
- September 11, 1955, for the Baltimore Orioles

Last MLB appearance
- September 25, 1955, for the Baltimore Orioles

MLB statistics
- Batting average: .267
- Home runs: 0
- Runs batted in: 3
- Stats at Baseball Reference

Teams
- Baltimore Orioles (1955)

Angelo George Dagres (August 22, 1934 – December 23, 2017) was an American professional baseball player. An outfielder, Dagres was signed to a bonus contract by the Baltimore Orioles of Major League Baseball on September 11, 1955 — and made his Major League debut later that day when he started as the Orioles' left fielder in the second game of a doubleheader against the Kansas City Athletics at Memorial Stadium. Dagres would go on to appear in seven more games during the 1955 season, his only year in the big leagues.

Dagres was born in Newburyport, Massachusetts. Nicknamed "Junior", he batted and threw left-handed, stood 5 feet 11 inches (1.80 m) tall and weighed 175 pounds (79 kg). After a standout career at Newburyport High School, the University of Rhode Island, and amateur baseball, he signed with the Orioles at age 21 on a Sunday morning. A few hours later, he was playing in the Majors. "I saw the lineup, and there I was", he told The Boston Globe in 2011. "I wasn’t even in the scorebook that day." Although Dagres went hitless in two at bats against Kansas City starting pitcher Mike Kume, he knocked in a run in his first Major League plate appearance with a force out, and played errorless ball in the field.

== Strong debut in Major Leagues ==
The highlight of Dagres' MLB career would come nine days later, when he appeared in both games of a doubleheader on September 20 at Fenway Park, only 30 miles (48 km) from his hometown. Dagres collected two hits in seven at bats, knocked in two runs, and talked hitting with Red Sox superstar Ted Williams, as the Orioles swept both games. All told, Dagres batted 15 times in 1955, scored five runs, and registered four hits. He won praise from Paul Richards, who was the Orioles' general manager and field manager at the time, and third-base coach Lum Harris.

"He's really a tiger, isn’t he? He hustles from the time he steps on the field," Richards said.

"There's a kid I wouldn't take $150,000 for", Harris said.

== Minor league demotion became permanent ==
But Richards also cautioned: "Just how far he can go from here, you can’t tell — but he's got an awful lot of ability." Dagres was so confident in himself, he rejected batting tips from Richards. And despite a good spring training in 1956, Dagres was optioned to Baltimore's top farm team, the Vancouver Mounties of the Open-Classification Pacific Coast League. Dagres didn't take the demotion well, and his poor attitude may have ruined his career. He never returned to the Majors.

"If I was the coach of the Orioles back then, I wouldn't have brought me up, either", Dagres told The Daily News of Newburyport in 2010. "I was spitting in their eye. They told me to do something, and I went on my own. If I had been a regular, normal person, I would have gone to Vancouver and busted my (butt). I would have been back in Baltimore shortly. Instead, I was brooding. My mind wasn't right, I started drinking, and that got progressively worse."

Dagres' professional career continued through the 1961 season in minor league baseball, where he batted .277 in 734 games. After his retirement, he was a restaurateur in his native city, a baseball coach at what is now Salem State University, and a greyhound dog trainer.

Dagres died on December 23, 2017.
