= Chuck Locke =

American baseball player (1932–2015)

- Pitcher
- Born: May 5, 1932; Malden, Missouri, U.S.
- Died: January 9, 2015 (aged 82); Poplar Bluff, Missouri, U.S.
- Batted: Right Threw: Right

MLB debut
- September 16, 1955, for the Baltimore Orioles

Last MLB appearance
- September 23, 1955, for the Baltimore Orioles

MLB statistics
- Win–loss record: 0–0
- Earned run average: 0.00
- Innings: 3
- Stats at Baseball Reference

Teams
- Baltimore Orioles (1955)

Charles Edward Locke (May 5, 1932 – January 9, 2015) was an American professional baseball player. Locke was a right-handed pitcher who appeared in two Major League Baseball games for the 1955 Baltimore Orioles, and although he allowed no hits or runs in three total innings of work as a reliever, he never again pitched in the Majors.

Locke, who stood 5 feet 11 inches (1.80 m) tall and weighed 185 pounds (84 kg), spent nine years (1950–1958) in professional baseball; all but four games were played in the Baltimore organization. He signed with the franchise in 1950 when it was still the St. Louis Browns and was recalled by the Orioles in 1955 after he won 18 games for the San Antonio Missions of the Double-A Texas League.

In his MLB debut, at Memorial Stadium against the Washington Senators, he came into the game in the eighth inning with Baltimore trailing, 7–4. Locke allowed one baserunner, on an error, but got out of the inning unscathed when Eddie Yost's fly ball resulted in a 9–6–5 double play. He left for a pinch hitter in the bottom of the eighth, when the Orioles rallied to tie the game — which they went on to win, 8–7.

In his second and final appearance a week later, also against the Senators (but at Griffith Stadium), Locke pitched the last two innings of a 7–3 Oriole defeat. He retired Washington in order in the seventh, and in the eighth recorded his only Major League strikeout (Yost) and base on balls (José Valdivielso).

Locke returned to minor league baseball in 1956 and retired after the 1958 season after 274 minor league games and an 82–97 won–lost record.
