= Wayne Causey =

American baseball player (born 1936)

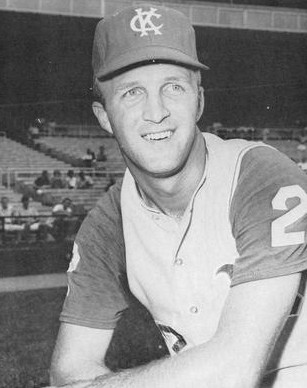
- Infielder
- Born: December 26, 1936 (age 88); Ruston, Louisiana, U.S.
- Batted: Left Threw: Right

MLB debut
- June 5, 1955, for the Baltimore Orioles

Last MLB appearance
- September 20, 1968, for the Atlanta Braves

MLB statistics
- Batting average: .252
- Home runs: 35
- Runs batted in: 285
- Stats at Baseball Reference

Teams
- Baltimore Orioles (1955–1957); Kansas City Athletics (1961–1966); Chicago White Sox (1966–1968); California Angels (1968); Atlanta Braves (1968)

James Wayne Causey (born December 26, 1936) is an American former professional baseball player. An infielder, he appeared in 1,105 games in Major League Baseball as a shortstop, second baseman and third baseman over 11 seasons for the Baltimore Orioles, Kansas City Athletics, Chicago White Sox, California Angels and Atlanta Braves between 1955 and 1968. He batted left-handed, threw right-handed, and was listed as 5 feet, 101/2 inches (1.8 m) tall and weighed 175 pounds (79 kg).

== Major League Baseball ==
Born in Ruston, Louisiana, Causey signed a bonus contract with the Orioles as an 18-year-old and was compelled to spend the first two years of his pro career on Baltimore's MLB roster per the rules of the time. His inexperience showed: he batted only .187 in 135 games with the Orioles between 1955 and 1957. Then, after almost four full years of minor league seasoning, he was traded to the Athletics prior to the 1961 season. In Kansas City he would have his most sustained success, batting .270 with 640 hits in 689 games played.

Causey finished 21st in voting for the 1963 American League MVP Award. He played in 139 games and had eight home runs, 44 runs batted in, and a .280 batting average. He then finished 25th in voting for 1964 AL MVP, and leading the league in times on base (265). He had eight homers, 49 RBI, and a .281 average that year.

In his 11 MLB seasons and 1,105 games, he had 819 hits, 35 home runs, 285 RBI, 12 stolen bases, and a .252 batting average.

== Education ==
Causey is a 1955 graduate of Neville High School, Monroe, Louisiana. He received a Bachelor of Science degree in accounting from Northeast Louisiana State College in 1965, after taking classes during each off-season from 1956 on. In 1964, he was named to "Who's Who in American Universities and Colleges."
