= Ted Gray =

American baseball player (1924–2011)

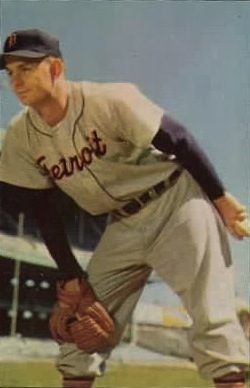
- Gray, c. 1953
- Pitcher
- Born: December 31, 1924; Detroit, Michigan, U.S.
- Died: June 15, 2011 (aged 86); Delray Beach, Florida, U.S.
- Batted: Switch Threw: Left

MLB debut
- May 15, 1946, for the Detroit Tigers

Last MLB appearance
- September 8, 1955, for the Baltimore Orioles

MLB statistics
- Win–loss record: 59–74
- Earned run average: 4.37
- Strikeouts: 687
- Stats at Baseball Reference

Teams
- Detroit Tigers (1946, 1948–1954); Chicago White Sox (1955); Cleveland Indians (1955); New York Yankees (1955); Baltimore Orioles (1955)

Career highlights and awards
- All-Star (1950)

Ted Glenn Gray (December 31, 1924 – June 15, 2011) was an American pitcher in Major League Baseball who played eight seasons with the Detroit Tigers (1946, 1948–1954), and then had short stints during the 1955 season with the Chicago White Sox, Cleveland Indians, New York Yankees, and Baltimore Orioles.

A native Detroiter, Gray was a star pitcher at Highland Park High School. He signed with the Tigers in 1942 at age 17 and played the 1942 season with Winston-Salem in the Piedmont League, posting a 13–14 record and a 2.04 ERA. He briefly joined the Tigers at the end of the 1942 season but did not play.

Gray enlisted in the Navy when he turned 18 after the 1942 season. Gray was assigned to the Great Lakes Naval Training Station where he pitched for the Great Lakes team which was managed by Mickey Cochrane. Tigers pitchers Schoolboy Rowe and Dizzy Trout also pitched for Cochrane's star-studded Great Lakes team. Gray was transferred to the New Hebrides in the Pacific Theater, where he continued pitching for the Navy. He won 12 straight games and averaged 17 strikeouts per game in his Navy career. In January 1945, he pitched for the Navy All Stars. He lost his first game against the Army All Stars 3–1 despite striking out 19 batters. In three games against the Army All Stars, Gray had a 1–2 record and a remarkable 46 strikeouts. After the series, The Sporting News reported: "You can’t tell any of the fellows in this war sector that when peace is restored, Ted Gray won’t match the records of Grove, Hubbell, Pennock, Newhouser and the other great lefthanders [sic]." (The Sporting News, February 22, 1945.)

After the war, Gray played with Buffalo before joining the Tigers briefly in 1946. He pitched only three games in the Major Leagues in 1946 (a 0–2 record) and was returned to the minors where he spent the balance of the 1946 season and the entire 1947 season. Gray returned to the Tigers in 1948, posting a record of 6–2.

Though Gray never lived up to the expectations that were created by his wartime performance, he became part of the Tigers starting rotation from 1949 to 1953. In 1949, Gray won 10 games and had a career-best 3.51 ERA (Adjusted ERA+ of 118).

Gray then got off to a phenomenal start in 1950, winning 10 games before the All-Star break. He was selected for the American League All-Star team but ended up as the losing pitcher in the 1950 All-Star Game after giving up a game-winning home run to Red Schoendienst in the 14th inning. After the All Star game, Gray failed to win another game for the remainder of the year, finishing with a 10-7 record.

Gray reportedly suffered from chronic blisters that hindered his performance.

In 1951, Gray's downward slide continued as he led the American League in losses with a record of 7–14. And in 1952, Gray was among the league leaders in losses with 17 (third most in the AL) and earned runs allowed with 103 (third most in the AL).

Gray was a power pitcher who was known for his forkball and ranked among the American League leaders in strikeouts four consecutive years from 1950 to 1954. He had the second-highest rate of strikeouts per 9 innings in both 1951 (5.97) and 1952 (5.88). He was also among the league leaders in home runs allowed on three occasions, leading the league in home runs allowed in 1953 with 25.

At the end of the 1954 season, Gray was traded to the Chicago White Sox with Walt Dropo. He was released by four teams during the 1955 season. Only two other players have played for four American League teams in one season: Frank Huelsman and Paul Lehner.

Gray posted a career won-loss record of 59–74 with a 4.37 ERA in 222 career games.
