= Don Leppert =

American baseball player (1931–2023)

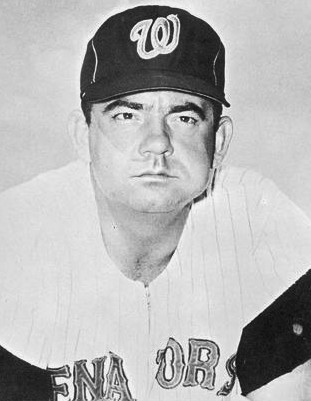
- Leppert in 1963
- Catcher
- Born: October 19, 1931; Indianapolis, Indiana, U.S.
- Died: April 13, 2023 (aged 91); Delaware, Ohio, U.S.
- Batted: Right Threw: Right

MLB debut
- June 18, 1961, for the Pittsburgh Pirates

Last MLB appearance
- September 16, 1964, for the Washington Senators

MLB statistics
- Batting average: .229
- Home runs: 15
- Runs batted in: 59
- Stats at Baseball Reference

Teams
- Pittsburgh Pirates (1961–1962); Washington Senators (1963–1964)

Career highlights and awards
- All-Star (1963)

Donald George Leppert (October 19, 1931 – April 13, 2023) was an American professional baseball player and coach.

A catcher, Leppert appeared in Major League Baseball (MLB) from 1961 to 1964 for the Pittsburgh Pirates and Washington Senators. Leppert threw and batted right-handed; he stood 6 feet 2 inches (1.88 m) tall and weighed 220 pounds (100 kg). He was born in Indianapolis and began his 12-year active career in 1955 in the Milwaukee Braves' organization.

== Playing career ==
During an MLB career of only 3½ years, Leppert nonetheless distinguished himself by hitting a home run on the first pitch thrown to him in the majors. On June 18, 1961, Leppert connected in the second inning of his MLB debut against Curt Simmons of the St. Louis Cardinals; the blow gave the Pirates a 2–1 lead in a game they would eventually win, 5–3.

Almost two years later, on April 11, 1963, he hit three homers in his third game in the American League: a solo shot off Ike Delock in the fourth inning, followed by a three-run blast and another solo homer, both off relief pitcher Chet Nichols Jr., as the Senators beat the Boston Red Sox, 8–0, at DC Stadium. To top it all off, Leppert caught Tom Cheney's one-hit shutout, with the Washington pitcher striking out ten Red Sox.

That season, Leppert was selected as a reserve on the American League All-Star team, but he did not play in the July 9 game at Cleveland Stadium.

In 190 Major League games, Leppert collected 122 hits, including 22 doubles and 15 home runs. He batted .229.

== Coaching career ==
After his playing career ended in the minors in 1966, Leppert managed in Class A in the Pittsburgh organization in 1967.

Leppert then embarked upon an 18-year stint as a Major League coach for the Pirates (1968–1976), Toronto Blue Jays (1977–1979) and Houston Astros (1980–1985).

In the late 1980s, Leppert served as field coordinator of minor league instruction for the Minnesota Twins and managed in the Twins' farm system.

Leppert also umpired a game on August 25, 1978, in Toronto during an umpires' strike. The Blue Jays' Leppert and Jerry Zimmerman, then the bullpen coach of the Twins, are the last two active coaches to umpire a major league game.

== Personal life and death ==
Leppert and his wife, Daphine, had five children. He died on April 13, 2023, at his home in Delaware, Ohio, at the age of 91.

== See also ==
- Home run in first Major League at-bat
