= Don Leppert (second baseman) =

American baseball player (1930–2021)

- Second baseman
- Born: November 20, 1930; Memphis, Tennessee
- Died: January 5, 2021 (aged 90); Olive Branch, Mississippi
- Batted: Left Threw: Right

MLB debut
- April 11, 1955, for the Baltimore Orioles

Last MLB appearance
- September 25, 1955, for the Baltimore Orioles

MLB statistics
- Batting average: .114
- Home runs: 0
- Runs batted in: 2
- Stats at Baseball Reference

Teams
- Baltimore Orioles (1955)

Donald Eugene Leppert (November 20, 1930 – January 5, 2021) was an American professional baseball second baseman. Nicknamed "Tiger", Leppert stood 5 feet 8 inches (1.73 m) tall, weighed 175 pounds (79 kg), batted left-handed and threw right-handed.

Leppert attended Christian Brothers High School in Memphis and signed his first pro contract with the New York Yankees. He played in the Yankee farm system for five seasons. After 1954, a season during which Leppert batted .313 with ten home runs and 170 hits for the Double-A Birmingham Barons of the Southern Association, Leppert was shipped to the Baltimore Orioles in a 17-player trade, one of the largest deals in Major League Baseball history. (The swap featured Bob Turley, Don Larsen and Gus Triandos, who would go on to stardom in the Majors.) He then appeared in 40 games for the 1955 Orioles, mustering only eight hits in 70 at bats for a .114 career MLB batting average. He had one extra-base hit, a triple, during that time.

Leppert finished his playing career in minor league baseball with Birmingham in 1956. He hit .291 in 789 minor-league games.

He is sometimes confused with Donald George Leppert, a catcher who played for the Pittsburgh Pirates and Washington Senators during the 1960s, and later a longtime coach for several MLB teams.

Leppert died on January 5, 2021, at the age of 90.
