= Bill Miller (left-handed pitcher) =

American baseball player (1927–2003)

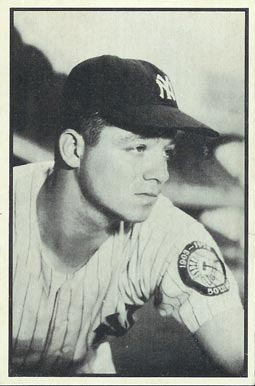
- Pitcher
- Born: July 26, 1927; Minersville, Pennsylvania
- Died: July 1, 2003 (aged 75); Lititz, Pennsylvania
- Batted: Left Threw: Left

MLB debut
- April 20, 1952, for the New York Yankees

Last MLB appearance
- May 8, 1955, for the Baltimore Orioles

MLB statistics
- Win–loss record: 6–9
- Earned run average: 4.24
- Innings: 131 2/3
- Stats at Baseball Reference

Teams
- New York Yankees (1952–1954); Baltimore Orioles (1955)

William Paul Miller (July 26, 1927 – July 1, 2003) was an American pitcher in Major League Baseball (MLB) who played from 1952 through 1955 for the New York Yankees (1952–1954) and Baltimore Orioles (1955). Listed at 6 feet (1.8 m) tall and 175 pounds (79 kg), Miller batted and threw left-handed.

== Biography ==
In his four-season MLB career, Miller posted a 6–9 record and a 4.24 ERA in 41 appearances, including 18 starts, five complete games, two shutouts and one save. In 131 2/3 innings of work, he surrendered 136 hits and 79 bases on balls with 158 strikeouts. He was a member of the Yankees teams that won the World Series in 1952 and 1953, though he did not pitch during the postseason. After the 1954 season, Miller was part of one of the largest trades in Major League history, a 17-player swap between the Yankees and Orioles that also included Gene Woodling, Gus Triandos, Don Larsen and Bob Turley.

But after only five games with the 1955 Orioles, four in relief, Miller was sent to the minor leagues. He retired after the 1956 season, his 12th as a professional.

== Death ==
Miller died of congestive heart failure at age 75.
