= Paul Richards (baseball) =

American baseball player, manager, and executive (1908–1986)

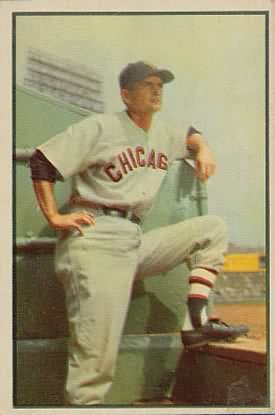
- Catcher / Manager
- Born: November 21, 1908; Waxahachie, Texas, U.S.
- Died: May 4, 1986 (aged 77); Waxahachie, Texas, U.S.
- Batted: Right Threw: Right

MLB debut
- April 17, 1932, for the Brooklyn Dodgers

Last MLB appearance
- September 22, 1946, for the Detroit Tigers

MLB statistics
- Batting average: .227
- Home runs: 15
- Runs batted in: 155
- Managerial record: 923–901
- Winning %: .506
- Stats at Baseball Reference
- Managerial record at Baseball Reference

Teams
- As player: Brooklyn Dodgers (1932); New York Giants (1933–1935); Philadelphia Athletics (1935); Detroit Tigers (1943–1946); As manager: Chicago White Sox (1951–1954); Baltimore Orioles (1955–1961); Chicago White Sox (1976); As General Manager: Baltimore Orioles (1955–1958); Houston Colt .45s / Astros (1962–1965); Atlanta Braves (1967–1972); Chicago White Sox (1976)

Career highlights and awards
- World Series champion (1945); Baltimore Orioles Hall of Fame

Paul Rapier Richards (November 21, 1908 – May 4, 1986) was an American professional baseball player, manager, scout and executive in Major League Baseball. During his playing career, he was a catcher and right-handed batter with the Brooklyn Dodgers (1932), New York Giants (1933–1935), Philadelphia Athletics (1935) and Detroit Tigers (1943–1946).

After his playing career, Richards became one of the most innovative and successful managers never to have won a pennant, managing the Chicago White Sox (1951–1954, 1976) and Baltimore Orioles (1955–1961). He also served as the general manager for the Orioles, the Houston Colt .45s / Astros and the Atlanta Braves.

== Baseball playing career ==
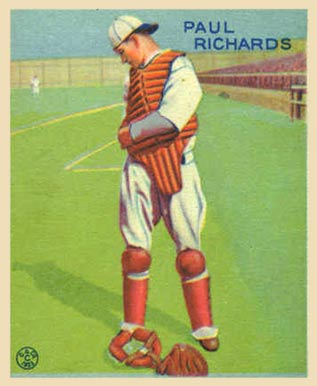
Richards as an active catcher

Born in Waxahachie, Texas, Richards began his professional baseball career in the minor leagues as an infielder in 1926 at the age of 17. In a baseball oddity, Richards pitched with both hands in a minor-league game on July 23, 1928, for the Muskogee Chiefs of the Class C Western Association against the Topeka Jayhawks. Called to the pitcher's mound from his shortstop position, he pitched both right-handed and left-handed in a brief appearance, including facing a switch hitter, which briefly resulted in both pitcher and batter switching hands and batter's boxes, respectively, until Richards broke the stalemate by alternating hands with each pitch, regardless of where the batter positioned himself. Later in his minor league career, he became a catcher.

After playing for seven years in the minor leagues, he made his major league debut at the age of 23 with the Brooklyn Dodgers on April 17, 1932. Richards's contract was then purchased by the Minneapolis Millers of the American Association in June 1932. In 78 games with Minneapolis, he posted a .361 batting average and, he was subsequently purchased by John McGraw's New York Giants in September 1932.

With the Giants, Richards served as a reserve catcher working behind Gus Mancuso for the 1933 season. Richards's future managing style was influenced by his time spent playing for Giants manager Bill Terry. Terry's no-nonsense style of managing, which concentrated on pitching and defense, made an impact on Richards. The Giants went on to win the 1933 World Series; Richards, however, did not make an appearance in the Fall Classic. After Richards batted just .160 in 1934, he was traded in May 1935 to Connie Mack's Philadelphia Athletics. He caught the majority of the Athletics' games in 1935 before being traded to the Atlanta Crackers for pitcher Al Williams in November.

Richards was already showing a keen baseball mind as Atlanta's catcher in 1936 when he helped turn around pitcher Dutch Leonard's career. After three seasons in the major leagues with the Brooklyn Dodgers, Leonard had been sent back to the minor leagues where he played with Richards in Atlanta. Richards encouraged him to throw a knuckleball and, within two years, Leonard was back in the major leagues with the Washington Senators, where he became a 20-game winner in 1939. Richards played for the Crackers from 1936 to 1942. From 1938 to 1942, he served as a player–manager for the Crackers. Richards led the Crackers to the pennant in 1938 and The Sporting News named him as minor league manager of the year.

When professional baseball experienced a shortage of players during World War II, Richards returned to the major leagues in 1943 with the Detroit Tigers at the age of 34. While his batting average was a relatively low .220 in 100 games played, he led the American League catchers in fielding percentage, range factor, baserunners caught stealing and putouts and, finished second in assists. Richards also served as an unofficial pitching coach for manager Steve O'Neill. His strong defensive play continued in 1944, leading the league's catchers in fielding percentage, range factor and baserunners caught stealing percentage, and finishing second in putouts and baserunners caught stealing, as the Tigers lost the pennant on the last day of the season.

In 1945, Richards's batting average improved to career-high .256, and he once again led the league's catchers in fielding percentage and in range factor, as the Tigers won the American League championship, then defeated the Chicago Cubs in the 1945 World Series. In the deciding Game 7 of the series, he hit 2 doubles and had 4 runs batted in. Richards was the Tigers' starting catcher in six games of the seven-game series, and contributed 6 runs batted in, second only to the 7 produced by Hank Greenberg. Despite his low batting average, he ended the season ranked in 10th place in the 1945 American League Most Valuable Player Award voting, due in part to his handling of the Tigers' pitching staff which led the league in winning percentage, strikeouts, shutouts and finished second in earned run average. Richards was one of the annual The Sporting News All-Stars for 1945.

After hitting only .201 in 1946, he returned to the minor leagues, playing three more seasons as a player-manager with the Buffalo Bisons. He led Buffalo to the International League pennant in 1949 before retiring as a player at the age of 40.

== Career statistics ==
In an eight-year major league career, Richards played in 523 games, accumulating 321 hits in 1,417 at bats for a .227 career batting average along with 15 home runs and 155 runs batted in. In 17 minor league seasons, he posted a career .295 batting average with 171 home runs. While he was a light-hitting player, he excelled as a defensive catcher, ending his career with a .987 fielding percentage. He led American League catchers three times in range factor, twice in fielding percentage and once each in baserunners caught stealing and in caught stealing percentage. Richard's 50.34% career caught stealing percentage ranks 13th all-time among major league catchers.

== Managing and executive career ==
Richards became a successful manager with the Chicago White Sox in 1951. In a baseball era when many teams relied on home runs for much of their offensive production, Richards went against the perceived common wisdom by relying on pitching, good defense, speed and stolen bases to manufacture runs with a strategy now known as small ball. The White Sox led the American League in stolen bases for 11 consecutive years, from 1951 to 1961. He managed the White Sox to four winning-record seasons, but his club finished behind the New York Yankees in 1951, 1952, 1953, and behind the 111-43 Cleveland Indians in 1954.

It was during his tenure as the White Sox manager where Richards' innovative methods earned him the nickname "The Wizard of Waxahachie." He once had White Sox left handed pitcher Billy Pierce play first base for one batter, bringing in a right handed pitcher to face a right handed hitter, taking out the starting first baseman, and then replacing him when Pierce went back to pitch one hitter later. Richard adopted the same no-nonsense style of managing that he had learned from Giants manager, Bill Terry in the 1930s. He would often walk up and down the dugout during a game asking players, "What's the count?" to ensure that they were paying attention to the game.

Paul Richards while manager of the Orioles

In September 1954, Richards was hired by the Baltimore Orioles, where he served as both field manager and general manager through 1958, becoming the first man since John McGraw to hold both positions simultaneously. As general manager, he was involved in a 17-player trade with the New York Yankees that remains the biggest trade in baseball history. Richards concentrated on signing good defensive players (such as Brooks Robinson) and hard-throwing young pitchers (such as Steve Barber, Milt Pappas and Chuck Estrada). After Lee MacPhail was hired as the general manager in 1959, Richards served strictly as the Orioles' field manager. The Orioles finally blossomed in 1960 with a second-place finish after five disappointing seasons. The Orioles' second-place finish was Richards's best as a manager. Both the Associated Press and United Press International named him the American League Manager of the Year.

1962 picture pack card of Richards

Richards led American League managers in ejections for 11 consecutive seasons from 1951 to 1961, setting an all-time managerial record. In September 1961, Richards resigned as manager of the Orioles to become general manager of the new Houston Colt .45s National League club. Richards stocked the Houston club (soon renamed the Astros) with young players – including Joe Morgan, Jimmy Wynn, Mike Cuellar, Don Wilson and Rusty Staub – but he was fired after the 1965 season when the on-field results did not match owner Roy Hofheinz's expectations.

The following year, Richards was hired as director of player personnel by the Atlanta Braves – returning to the city where he excelled as a minor league catcher and player-manager for the Southern Association's Atlanta Crackers from 1938 to 1942. By the end of the 1966 season, Richards was given the title of general manager of the Braves. Richards's six years at the helm of the Atlanta organization were in some ways his most successful in baseball. He inherited a strong core of players including Henry Aaron, Joe Torre, Felipe Alou, and Rico Carty. He added several young pitchers and position players to the mix and converted knuckleballing reliever Phil Niekro into a successful starter. His 1969 Braves, skippered by his longtime protege Luman Harris, won the National League Western Division title, but that team was swept by the eventual world champion "Miracle Mets" in the first National League Championship Series ever played. The Braves failed to contend in 1970 and 1971 and, Richards was fired in the middle of the 1972 season, replaced by Eddie Robinson.

In 1976, after three and a half years out of the game, Richards was hired by Bill Veeck to return to Chicago as manager of the White Sox. After a losing record, he retired from the field at the end of the season, but stayed in the game as a player personnel advisor with the White Sox, and later with the Texas Rangers. As a manager, he compiled a 923–901 record in 11 seasons (406–362 with Chicago, 517–539 with Baltimore).

Richards was credited in helping Sherm Lollar become one of the best catchers in the major leagues; he also helped Gus Triandos become a respectable defensive catcher. He is known for designing the oversized catcher's mitt first used by Triandos to catch Hall of Fame knuckleball pitcher Hoyt Wilhelm. Despite his skills as a motivator, mentor and strategist of the game, Richards never was able to lead a team to a pennant. Sixteen of his players became major league managers.

Richards died of a heart attack in Waxahachie, Texas, at the age of 77. In 1996, Richards was inducted into the Georgia Sports Hall of Fame. Paul Richards Park in Waxahachie has been named a Texas Historical Landmark.

=== Waxahachie swap ===
Beginning in 1951, Richards reintroduced and was erroneously credited with inventing a tactic which had not been used in the major leagues since 1909. Four or five times in his career, Richards shifted a pitcher to the outfield and inserted a new pitcher in order to gain a platoon advantage before putting the original pitcher back on the mound. Rob Neyer, writing for ESPN.com in 2009, endorsed a reader's suggestion and introduced a name for the gambit, "the Waxahachie Swap."

=== Managerial record ===
Team	Year	Regular season					Postseason			
Team	Year	Games	Won	Lost	Win %	Finish	Won	Lost	Win %	Result
CWS	1951	154	81	73	.526	4th in AL	–	–	–	–
CWS	1952	154	81	73	.526	3rd in AL	–	–	–	–
CWS	1953	154	89	65	.578	3rd in AL	–	–	–	–
CWS	1954	145	91	54	.628	resigned	–	–	–	–
BAL	1955	154	57	97	.370	7th in AL	–	–	–	–
BAL	1956	154	69	85	.448	6th in AL	–	–	–	–
BAL	1957	152	76	76	.500	5th in AL	–	–	–	–
BAL	1958	153	74	79	.484	6th in AL	–	–	–	–
BAL	1959	154	74	80	.481	6th in AL	–	–	–	–
BAL	1960	154	89	65	.578	2nd in AL	–	–	–	–
BAL	1961	135	78	57	.578	resigned	–	–	–	–
BAL total		1056	517	539	.490		0	0	–	
CWS	1976	161	64	97	.398	6th in AL	–	–	–	–
CWS total		768	406	362	.529		0	0	–	
Total		1824	923	901	.506		0	0	–	

== See also ==
- List of Major League Baseball managers with most career ejections
- List of Major League Baseball managers with most career wins

== Notes and references ==
Preceded by Arthur Ehlers	Baltimore Orioles General Manager; 1954–1958	Succeeded by Lee MacPhail
Preceded by Gabe Paul	Houston Colt .45s/Astros General Manager; 1961–1965	Succeeded by Spec Richardson
Preceded by John McHale	Atlanta Braves General Manager; 1966–1972	Succeeded by Eddie Robinson
