= Gene Woodling =

American baseball player (1922–2001)

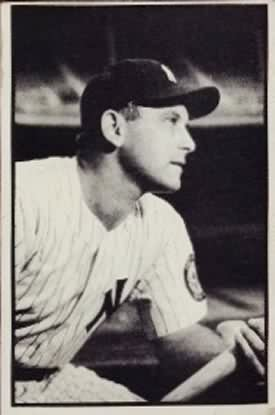
- Outfielder
- Born: August 16, 1922; Akron, Ohio, U.S.
- Died: June 2, 2001 (aged 78); Wadsworth, Ohio, U.S.
- Batted: Left Threw: Right

MLB debut
- September 23, 1943, for the Cleveland Indians

Last MLB appearance
- September 15, 1962, for the New York Mets

MLB statistics
- Batting average: .284
- Home runs: 147
- Runs batted in: 830
- Stats at Baseball Reference

Teams
- Cleveland Indians (1943, 1946); Pittsburgh Pirates (1947); New York Yankees (1949–1954); Baltimore Orioles (1955); Cleveland Indians (1955–1957); Baltimore Orioles (1958–1960); Washington Senators (1961–1962); New York Mets (1962)

Career highlights and awards
- All-Star (1959²); 6× World Series champion (1949–1953, 1966); Baltimore Orioles Hall of Fame

Eugene Richard Woodling (August 16, 1922 – June 2, 2001) was an American professional baseball player, coach and scout. He played in Major League Baseball as an outfielder between 1943 and 1962, most prominently as a member of the New York Yankees dynasty that won five consecutive World Series championships between 1949 and 1953.

Woodling was a left-handed batter known as a line drive hitter who hit over .300 five times during his 17-year career and, had a .318 batting average during his five World Series appearances. He excelled defensively, leading American League outfielders in fielding or tied for the lead four times, and never made more than three errors in a season during his tenure with the Yankees. Woodling also played for the Cleveland Indians, Pittsburgh Pirates, Baltimore Orioles, Washington Senators, and the New York Mets in their expansion year of 1962. His baseball career was interrupted by his military service in the United States Navy during the Second World War. After his playing career, he served several major league teams as a coach and a scout.

== Early life ==
Woodling was born on August 16, 1922, in Akron, Ohio, where his father worked in a rubber factory. He played baseball at Akron East High School. Woodling also played semi-pro baseball for the Goodyear Rubber team while still in school, from 1937 to 1939, with a .452 batting average one year. In 2024, he was inducted into the Akron Public Schools Athletics Hall of Fame.

== Playing career and military service ==
=== Early career (1940-1943) ===
His professional baseball career began in 1940 when he signed with the Indians' organization. He was assigned to the Mansfield Braves of the Ohio State League in 1940, where he had a .398 batting average. In 1941, he was assigned to the Flint Arrows of the Michigan State League and hit .394. He broke his leg early in the 1942 season, but in 1943 Woodling hit .344 for the Wilkes-Barre Barons of the Eastern League. He was called up briefly to the major leagues in September, where he hit .320 for Cleveland in 25 at bats.

=== Naval service (1944-1945) ===
Woodling was drafted into the U.S. Navy during World War II, in October 1943. He was sent to Naval Station Great Lakes, located in Illinois on Lake Michigan, where he spent the year in "ship's company". During that time, he played baseball with other professional baseball players who had joined the Navy, as the Great Lakes Blue Jackets, under Lieutenant Commander Mickey Cochrane (a Hall of Fame catcher). The team included future Hall of Fame second baseman Billy Herman, Al Glossop, Schoolboy Rowe and Si Johnson, winning 48 out of 50 games in 1944. In February 1945, Woodling was sent on a tour of duty with the Third Fleet to the Marshall Islands, Guam, Saipan and Leyte in the Philippines. Woodling was discharged from Naval service in January 1946.

=== Return to baseball ===
Woodling returned to baseball in 1946, at the major league level. He played 61 games for Cleveland, batting only .188. He was traded to the Pirates in December for Al Lopez. In 1947, he played for the Newark Bears of the International League in Triple-A baseball, batting .289. At the end of the season, the Pirates traded Woodling to the San Francisco Seals of the Pacific Coast League (PCL), and he batted .386 in 1948. The Sporting News named him Minor League Player of the Year. While with the Seals, Woodling came under the hitting tutelage of manager Lefty O'Doul, who as a major league player had a lifetime .349 batting average. Woodling credited O'Doul with getting him back to the major leagues.

Before coming to the majors for good in 1949, Woodling was a four-time minor league batting average champion. He mostly played left field (1,208 games) when he entered the majors, but appeared in 325 contests in right field and played 93 games in center.

=== Yankees career ===
On September 30, 1948, the Seals sold Woodling's rights to the Yankees. Casey Stengel had been manager of the Oakland Oaks of the PCL in 1948, and his team played against Woodling. He became the Yankees manager for the 1949 season, and was likely involved with the Yankees acquiring Woodling.

Woodling played with six teams during his career, the longest term of service being with the Yankees for six years and 698 of the 1,763 games played of his MLB career. With them, Woodling had what was probably his best year, 1953. Although he only had 395 at bats, he hit .306, and with 82 walks led the American League with a .429 on-base percentage. While Woodling was with the Yankees, the team won five consecutive World Series (1949–53).

During that time, Yankee manager Casey Stengel praised the outfielder's ability to run and throw. He considered Woodling his best defensive left fielder. Woodling led AL outfielders in fielding percentage in 1952 and 1953. Stengel generally platooned him with right-hander Hank Bauer, but each averaged 400 at bats per season. On one end, in 1949 Bauer had 349 plate appearances in 103 games and Woodling had 357 plate appearances in 112 games. On the other end, in 1952, Bauer had 615 plate appearances in 141 games and Woodling had 471 in 122 games. Woodling said that in fact Stengel platooned Woodling and Bauer less than commonly believed, and it had been exaggerated. After his first year sharing time with Bauer, Johnny Lindell and Cliff Mapes, his New York Times obituary describes him as being occasionally platooned.

In the 1949 World Series he hit .400 in three games, and in the 1950 World Series, Woodling hit .429. Woodling hit a solo home run in each World Series from 1951 through 1953. In 1951, Woodling helped Allie Reynolds secure his first of two no-hitters on the season, when he homered in a 1–0 win over Bob Feller and the Indians. In 1952, Woodling became the first player to pinch-hit a triple in the World Series.

On November 17, 1954, a record 17-player deal took place between the Orioles and Yankees, involving Woodling, future 20-game winner Bob Turley and Don Larsen, who would go on to pitch a perfect game in the 1956 World Series for New York. Woodling had been sidelined for the last part of the 1954 season with a badly sprained wrist, that was originally thought to be broken.

Orioles and Indians career

In 1955, Woodling began the year hitting poorly for the Orioles, with a .221 batting average. He was traded to the Indians along with Billy Cox from the Orioles for Dave Pope, Wally Westlake and cash before the trade deadline on June 15, 1955. He hit .278 for the Indians that year. He played two more full seasons in Cleveland, setting career-highs in home runs (19), runs batted in (78), and batting (.321) in 1957.

The Orioles manager Paul Richards then traded for Woodling again in April 1958, where Woodling played well from 1958 to 1960. Woodling led the 1959 Baltimore Orioles season with a .300 batting average, to go along with 14 home runs, 77 RBIs (runs batted in), 78 walks and 63 runs scored, and he was named the Orioles Most Valuable Player. Woodling considered 1959 his best year as a major league player. He later was inducted into the Orioles Hall of Fame in 1992, and there is a plaque in his honor outside Oriole Park at Camden Yards.

=== Later career ===
In December 1960, Woodling was taken in the expansion draft by the Washington Senators. In 1961, at age 39, he batted .313 for the Senators in 110 games. A few months before he turned 40, in June 1962, he rights were sold to the New York Mets. In their first year of existence, Woodling's old Yankees manager Casey Stengel was working on his latest project, as manager of the newborn Mets. Woodling would be managed by Stengel for the remainder of the 1962 season. He was released before the 1963 season, after publicly criticizing the front office's contract negotiations with Marv Throneberry.

=== Career ===
In his 17-season career, Woodling batted .284 with 147 home runs and 830 RBIs in 1,796 games. Woodling ended with a .386 on-base percentage and 1,585 career hits in 5,587 at bats. He hit .300 or better five times. In five World Series, Woodling hit .318 (27-85). As an outfielder, he recorded a .989 fielding percentage.

== Coaching and scouting ==
Woodling was appointed on November 20, 1963, as the Orioles' first-base coach by former Yankees teammate Hank Bauer, who had become the team's manager one day earlier. He remained in that capacity through the 1966 World Series Championship season and up until the announcement on September 28, 1967, that he would not be retained for the 1968 season. He was also a scout for the Yankees and the Indians.

== Personal life ==
After coaching and scouting he worked for Eaton Corp. selling millions of grips for aluminum baseball bats. During his career and after, Woodling had a large farm in Medina, Ohio, where he also raised Appaloosa horses.

== Death ==
Woodling died on June 2, 2001, at the age of 78, in a nursing home in Wadsworth, Ohio.

== Sources ==
- Woodling, Gene; Smith, Robert (1967). Gene Woodling's Secrets of Batting. G.P. Putnam's Sons.

Sporting positions
Preceded by Hank Bauer	Baltimore Orioles first base coach 1964–1967	Succeeded by Earl Weaver
