= Dick Kryhoski =

American baseball player (1925–2007)

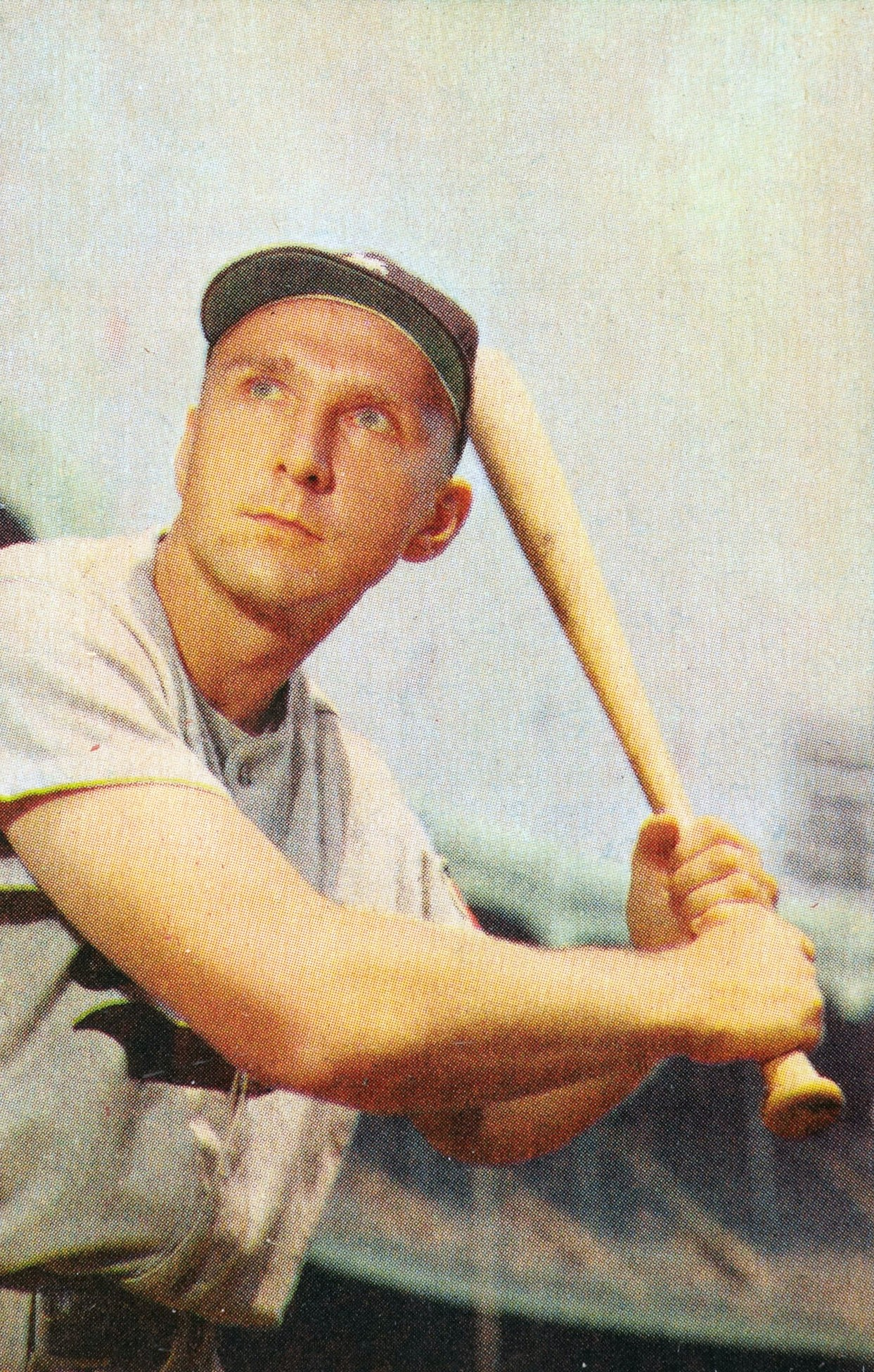
- Kryhoski, c. 1953
- First baseman
- Born: March 24, 1925; Leonia, New Jersey, U.S.
- Died: April 10, 2007 (aged 82); Beverly Hills, Michigan, U.S.
- Batted: Left Threw: Left

MLB debut
- April 19, 1949, for the New York Yankees

Last MLB appearance
- June 10, 1955, for the Kansas City Athletics

MLB statistics
- Batting average: .265
- Home runs: 45
- Runs batted in: 231
- Stats at Baseball Reference

Teams
- New York Yankees (1949); Detroit Tigers (1950–1951); St. Louis Browns / Baltimore Orioles (1952–1954); Kansas City Athletics (1955)

Richard David Kryhoski (March 24, 1925 – April 10, 2007) was an American professional baseball first baseman. He played in Major League Baseball (MLB) for four different franchises between 1949 and 1955. Listed at 6 feet 2 inches (1.88 m) and 200 pounds (91 kg), he batted and threw left-handed.

== Biography ==
Kryhoski was born and raised in Leonia, New Jersey. He attended Upsala College in East Orange, New Jersey. Kryhoski had a promising baseball career before injuries, deep slumps, and frequent trades forced his premature retirement. He served in the military during World War II, in the Pacific theater.

Signed by the New York Yankees as an amateur free agent in 1946, Kryhoski hit .396 with 19 home runs and 85 runs batted in with the Wellsville Yankees of the Pennsylvania–Ontario–New York League (PONY League) that season. As a member of the 1948 Kansas City Blues of the American Association, he hit .294 (160-for-545) with 30 doubles, seven triples, 13 home runs and 87 runs batted in. In 1949 he hit .328 with five home runs and 50 runs batted in with the Pacific Coast League Oakland Oaks, joining the New York Yankees late in the season.

The Yankees won the 1949 World Series when Kryhoski was a rookie with them. During the off-season, he was traded by New York to the Detroit Tigers in exchange for Dick Wakefield.

Kryhoski played with Detroit from 1950 to 1951, before joining the St. Louis Browns / Baltimore Orioles (1952–1954) and Kansas City Athletics (1955). One of his most productive seasons came in 1951 with the Tigers, when he hit .287 with 12 home runs and 57 runs batted in, batting third in the batting order. In 1953, he shared with Roy Sievers the first base job for the Browns in the last year of the team's existence. On July 16 of that year, the Browns tied, by then, a majors record with three successive home runs belted by Clint Courtney, Kryhoski and Jim Dyck, in the first inning of an 8–6 victory over the Yankees.

In a seven-season major league career, Kryhoski was a .265 hitter (475-for-1794), 45 home runs and 231 runs batted in over 569 games, with 203 runs, 85 doubles, 14 triples, five stolen bases, and a .314 on-base percentage. As a first baseman, he collected 3768 outs, 312 assists, 394 double plays, and 40 errors in 4120 total chances for a .990 fielding percentage.

Kryhoski died at his home in Beverly Hills, Michigan, just 17 days after his 82nd birthday.
