= Willy Miranda =

Cuban baseball player (1926–1996)

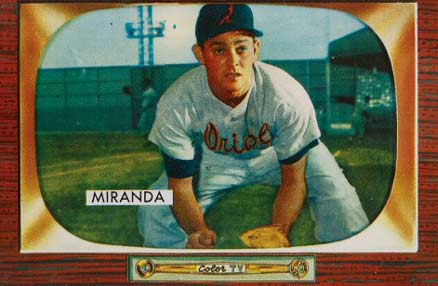
- Shortstop
- Born: May 24, 1926; Velasco, Cuba
- Died: September 7, 1996 (aged 70); Baltimore, Maryland, U.S.
- Batted: Switch Threw: Right

MLB debut
- May 6, 1951, for the Washington Senators

Last MLB appearance
- September 7, 1959, for the Baltimore Orioles

MLB statistics
- Batting average: .221
- Home runs: 6
- Runs batted in: 132
- Stats at Baseball Reference

Teams
- Washington Senators (1951); Chicago White Sox (1952); St. Louis Browns (1952, 1953); New York Yankees (1953–1954); Baltimore Orioles (1955–1959)
Medals
Men's baseball
Representing Cuba
Central American and Caribbean Games
Bronze medal – third place	1946 Barranquilla	Team

Guillermo "Willy" Miranda Perez (May 24, 1926 — September 7, 1996) was a Cuban-born professional baseball player who played shortstop in the Major Leagues from 1951–1959. Though he was often dazzling in the field, he was a notoriously light hitter, batting .221 lifetime in the majors with a .271 slugging percentage.

Born in Velasco, Cuba, Miranda was a switch-hitter who threw right-handed; he was listed at 5 ft 9 in (1.75 m) and 150 lb (68 kg).

He was a popular shortstop in the Cuban professional winter league, distinguishing himself as an outstanding fielder. He became even more famous in his native country for being the first Cuban player since the World War I era (Ángel Aragón and Armando Marsans) to play for the New York Yankees. This was notable because it took place during the decade of the 1950s, when the Yankees won six World Series -- and because Miranda had grown up as a fan of that team.

Miranda was on the Yankee roster for the 1953 World Series but did not appear in the Fall Classic. He played for nine years in the majors for the Yankees, Washington Senators, Chicago White Sox and St. Louis Browns/Baltimore Orioles. Frequently traded early in his career, he was passed back and forth between the White Sox and Browns during the 1952 season: traded by Chicago to St. Louis on June 15, 1952; claimed on waivers by the White Sox from the Browns 13 days later; then traded back to the Browns in October 1952. Finally, in June 1953, the Browns broke the cycle by selling Miranda's contract to the Yankees.

In 1955, Miranda led the American League in double plays.

He died at the age of 70 in Baltimore, Maryland.
