= Hal W. Smith =

American baseball player (1930–2020)

Hal Smith
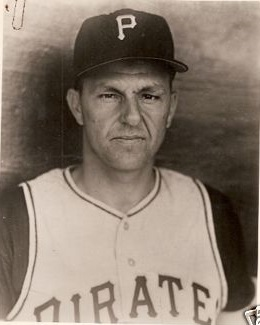
- Smith in 1961
- Catcher / Third baseman / First baseman
- Born: December 7, 1930; West Frankfort, Illinois, U.S.
- Died: January 9, 2020 (aged 89); Columbus, Texas, U.S.
- Batted: Right Threw: Right

MLB debut
- April 11, 1955, for the Baltimore Orioles

Last MLB appearance
- July 22, 1964, for the Cincinnati Reds

MLB statistics
- Batting average: .267
- Home runs: 58
- Runs batted in: 323
- Stats at Baseball Reference

Teams
- Baltimore Orioles (1955–1956); Kansas City Athletics (1956–1959); Pittsburgh Pirates (1960–1961); Houston Colt .45s (1962–1963); Cincinnati Reds (1964)

Career highlights and awards
- World Series champion (1960)

Harold Wayne Smith (December 7, 1930 – January 9, 2020) was an American professional baseball player who appeared in 879 games in Major League Baseball from 1955 to 1964 — mostly as a catcher, but also as a third baseman and first baseman. Smith played with five different MLB teams but is most notable for his integral role during the 1960 World Series as a member of the Pittsburgh Pirates.

During his playing career, he threw and batted right-handed, stood 6 feet (1.83 m) tall, and weighed 195 pounds (88 kg).

== Early Major League career ==
Smith was signed as an amateur free agent by the New York Yankees in 1949, but he never played for the Yankees. He was included in an enormous 17-player trade (one of the largest in Major League annals) to the Baltimore Orioles after the 1954 season and made his big-league debut with the Orioles as their starting catcher on Opening Day 1955, going hitless in three at bats against Bob Porterfield of the Washington Senators. Just a week into his first season, the Associated Press was calling him one of the eight best rookies of 1955, observing that he had four hits in his first 10 at bats.

During his rookie season, Smith appeared in a career-high 135 games, 113 as a starting catcher, but in 1956, he lost his regular job to Gus Triandos, who had also been traded by the Yankees to the Orioles in that 17-player deal.

Smith was swapped to the Kansas City Athletics for fellow backstop Joe Ginsberg in August 1956; he would play in Kansas City through 1959 as a catcher and third baseman, batting over .300 in 1957. Inter-league trading without waivers was inaugurated after the 1959 season, and on December 9, Smith was dealt to the Pirates for pitcher Dick Hall and two other players.

== Place in history ==
The right-handed-batting Smith platooned with left-handed-hitting Smoky Burgess behind the plate during the Pirates' pennant-winning 1960 regular season. On August 29, he hit a three-run home run against Johnny Podres in a 10–2 win over the Los Angeles Dodgers. In 95 games, 66 as a starting catcher, Smith set a career high in runs batted in (45), while swatting 11 home runs and hitting .295. During the World Series against the Yankees, Smith started Games 3 and 6 against ace left-hander Whitey Ford and went 2-for-7 as Ford shut out the Pirates in each outing.

Smith began Game 7 on the bench, then entered the contest in the eighth inning after starter Burgess was removed for a pinch runner. The Pirates were trailing 7–6 when Smith came to bat in the bottom of the eighth with two outs and Dick Groat and Roberto Clemente on the corners. With two balls and two strikes, Smith hit a dramatic three-run home run off right-hander Jim Coates to give the Pirates a 9–7 lead. His home run electrified the Forbes Field crowd, who thought his blast would win the World Series for the Pirates. However, his hit would be overshadowed, as the Yankees then battled back to tie it up in the top of the ninth, leading to Bill Mazeroski's walk-off homer to win the Series in the bottom of the inning. However, the eighth-inning blow was pivotal, and Smith would always be remembered as one of the heroes of the 1960 World Series. According to an analysis by Grantland, Smith's hit was the single most important in baseball history, as measured by Championship Probability Added, as it single-handedly boosted Pittsburgh's odds of winning the World Series from 30% to 93%.

== Career after 1960 ==
Smith and Burgess returned as the Pirates' platoon catchers in 1961, although Smith slumped to a .223 average with only three home runs. Left unprotected in the 1961 Major League Baseball expansion draft, he was selected by the Houston Colt .45s in the premium phase of the lottery. Smith was the catcher for the first Major League game in Houston baseball history, going 2-for-4 with a home run and a double in an 11–2 rout of the Chicago Cubs on April 10, 1962. He was the Colt .45s' regular catcher during their maiden National League season and hit 12 home runs, third on the club, but batted only .235. In 1963, rookie John Bateman claimed the starting catcher job and Smith split his season between Houston and the Colt .45s' Oklahoma City 89ers affiliate. He then wrapped up his MLB career in 1964 as a backup catcher with the Cincinnati Reds, hitting only .121 in 32 games.

Smith appeared in 879 games over ten Major League seasons, with his 715 hits including 148 doubles and ten triples. In addition, during the 1960–61 seasons, he was one of two Hal Smiths catching in the National League. The other, Harold Raymond Smith, toiled for the St. Louis Cardinals.

Smith died on January 9, 2020, in Columbus, Texas. He was 89 years old.
