= Harry Byrd (baseball) =

American baseball player (1925–1985)

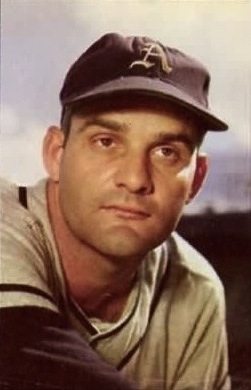
- Byrd c. 1953
- Pitcher
- Born: February 3, 1925; Darlington, South Carolina, U.S.
- Died: May 14, 1985 (aged 60); Darlington, South Carolina, U.S.
- Batted: Right Threw: Right

MLB debut
- April 21, 1950, for the Philadelphia Athletics

Last MLB appearance
- September 27, 1957, for the Detroit Tigers

MLB statistics
- Win–loss record: 46–54
- Earned run average: 4.35
- Strikeouts: 381
- Stats at Baseball Reference

Teams
- Philadelphia Athletics (1950–1953); New York Yankees (1954); Baltimore Orioles (1955); Chicago White Sox (1955–1956); Detroit Tigers (1957)

Career highlights and awards
- AL Rookie of the Year (1952)

Harry Gladwin Byrd (February 3, 1925 – May 14, 1985) was an American Major League Baseball right-handed starting pitcher who played for the Philadelphia Athletics, New York Yankees, Baltimore Orioles, Chicago White Sox, and Detroit Tigers. He was born in Darlington, South Carolina.

Byrd pitched in six games with the Athletics in 1950, spent a season back in the minors, and was called back up to the big club in 1952. That year he enjoyed his best season, going 15–15 with a 3.31 earned run average (ERA) and being selected as the American League Rookie of the Year.

In 1953 Byrd went 11–20, but he worked 237 innings. At the start of the 1954 season, he was part of a ten-player trade between the Athletics and Yankees. In New York he finished 9–7 with a 2.99 ERA. At the end of the season, he was sent to the Orioles as part of a 17-player mega-deal.

Byrd went 3–2 with Baltimore in 1955, before being shipped off again to the White Sox. He finished with a combined 7–8 record with a 4.61 ERA. After pitching briefly with the Sox in 1956, he ended his career in 1957 with the Tigers.

In a seven-year career, Byrd compiled a 46–54 record with 381 strikeouts and a 4.35 ERA in 827 2/3 innings.

Byrd lived in the small logging community of Mont Clare, just outside his birthplace of Darlington, South Carolina. He died in Darlington aged 60 after a bout with lung cancer. SC 151 in Darlington County was named after him (Harry Byrd Highway). SC 151 also shares the name Bobo Newsom Highway, named after another major-league pitcher from the area (Hartsville).
