= Gus Triandos =

American baseball player (1930–2013)

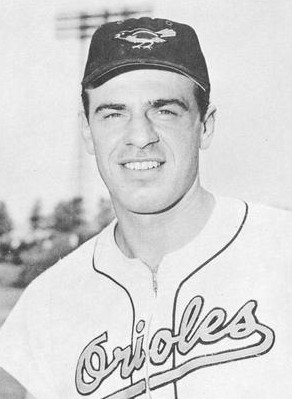
- Catcher
- Born: July 30, 1930; San Francisco, California, U.S.
- Died: March 28, 2013 (aged 82); San Jose, California, U.S.
- Batted: Right Threw: Right

MLB debut
- August 3, 1953, for the New York Yankees

Last MLB appearance
- August 15, 1965, for the Houston Astros

MLB statistics
- Batting average: .244
- Home runs: 167
- Runs batted in: 608
- Stats at Baseball Reference

Teams
- New York Yankees (1953–1954); Baltimore Orioles (1955–1962); Detroit Tigers (1963); Philadelphia Phillies (1964–1965); Houston Astros (1965)

Career highlights and awards
- 4× All-Star (1957–1959²); Baltimore Orioles Hall of Fame

Gus Triandos (/triːˈɑːndoʊs/ tree-AHN-dohs; July 30, 1930 – March 28, 2013) was an American professional baseball player and scout. He played in Major League Baseball as a catcher and a first baseman, most prominently as a member of the Baltimore Orioles where he was a four-time All-Star player. He also played for the New York Yankees and the Detroit Tigers of the American League (AL) and the Philadelphia Phillies and Houston Astros of the National League (NL). In 1981, he was inducted into the Baltimore Orioles Hall of Fame. Triandos is notable for being the first catcher in MLB history to catch a no-hitter in both the American League and the National League, catching a no-hitter by Hoyt Wilhelm in 1958 while on the Orioles in the AL and Jim Bunning's perfect game while on the Phillies in the NL.

== Playing career ==
Born in San Francisco, California, Triandos attended Mission High School and was signed by the New York Yankees as an amateur free agent in 1948. He joined the Yankees' major league roster briefly as a 22-year-old in 1953, but was sent back to the minor leagues in 1954. Triandos was traded to the Baltimore Orioles in 1954 where he played mostly as a first baseman for his first two years with the team, before becoming the Orioles' regular catcher in 1957. As the Orioles' catcher, he used an outsized catcher's mitt designed by manager Paul Richards to handle the unpredictable knuckleball of Hoyt Wilhelm. Triandos was behind the plate when Wilhelm threw a no hitter against the New York Yankees on September 20, 1958, the first no-hitter in Baltimore Orioles history, and also scored the only run of the game when he hit a home run in the eighth inning.

Although perhaps the slowest runner in the league, Triandos once hit an inside-the-park home run. As of 2021, he also holds the record for the most consecutive games without being caught stealing, 1,206. That accounts for his entire career, in which he had exactly one stolen base. That stolen base came on September 28, 1958, in the 9th inning of the last game of the season, at Yankee Stadium, off rookie pitcher Zach Monroe and catcher Darrell Johnson. Triandos had his best year in 1958, when he hit 16 home runs by mid-season to earn the starting catcher's role for the American League in the 1958 All-Star Game, breaking Yogi Berra's eight-year stranglehold on the position. He ended the season leading all American League catchers in putouts with 698, and tied Berra's American League record of 30 home runs by a catcher. In 1959, he hit 20 home runs by mid-season and was again selected to be the starting catcher for the American League in the 1959 All-Star Game, However, a hand injury meant that he only had 25 home runs for the entire season.

In 1962, he hit .169 in 63 games and was traded to the Detroit Tigers at the end of the year. With the Tigers in 1963, he shared catching duties with Bill Freehan and led American League catchers with a .996 fielding percentage. The following winter, he was traded along with Jim Bunning to the Philadelphia Phillies, where he again shared catching duties, this time with Clay Dalrymple. As the Phillies' catcher, Triandos caught Bunning's perfect game against the New York Mets on June 21, 1964, thus becoming the first catcher in Major League history to catch no hitters in both the American and National Leagues. His contract was purchased by the Houston Astros from the Philadelphia Phillies on June 14, 1965. He played in his final major league game at the age of 34 before being released by the Astros on August 20, 1965.

== Career statistics ==
In his 13-year major league career, Triandos played in 1,206 games, accumulating 954 hits in 3,907 at bats for a .244 career batting average along with 167 home runs, 608 runs batted in and a .322 on-base percentage. He ended his career with a .987 fielding percentage in 992 games as a catcher and, a .988 fielding percentage in 168 games as a first baseman. Triandos led American League catchers twice in assists and in baserunners caught stealing. In 1957, he threw out 66.7% of the base runners trying to steal a base, the third highest single-season ratio in Major League history. Over his career, Triandos threw out 46.62% of the base runners who tried to steal a base on him, ranking him 6th on the all-time list. Triandos was elected to the American League All-Star team for three consecutive years, in 1957, 1958 and 1959. His 142 home runs hit as an Oriole player ranks him 13th highest in the team's history. In 1961, the reigning American League stolen base champion, Luis Aparicio, rated Triandos just below Earl Battey as the toughest catcher on which to attempt a stolen base.

== Personal life ==
Triandos's family origins are from Koroni, Messenia, Greece. He was one of four children of Peter Triandos and Helen Mourgos, Greek immigrants to the U.S. He and wife Evelyn had three children, son Gary Triandos and daughters Lori Luna and Tracey Hook. Triandos served as a scout for the Los Angeles Dodgers from 1973 to 1975. In later years, he lived in San Jose, California. Triandos Drive in Timonium, Maryland is named in honor of the popular catcher.

== In popular culture ==
In the second episode of the third season of Baltimore-based HBO show The Wire, Triandos is referenced and discussed about by the character Herc, who talks about how Triandos was tasked with the tough job of catching for knuckleball pitcher Hoyt Wilhelm for five years and how Triandos remarked that catching for Wilhelm "nearly ruined me." The reference to Triandos arose when Herc told Carver that if he had to engage in sexual intercourse with any man it would have to be Triandos. David Simon, the showrunner for The Wire, wrote that he sent Triandos a copy of the script before filming and that Triandos called the reference "pretty funny".
