= 2011 in baseball =

The following are the baseball events of the year 2011 throughout the world.

== Champions ==
=== Major League Baseball ===
- Regular Season Champions

League	Eastern Division Champions	Central Division Champions	Western Division Champions	Wild Card Qualifier
American League	New York Yankees	Detroit Tigers	Texas Rangers	Tampa Bay Rays
National League	Philadelphia Phillies	Milwaukee Brewers	Arizona Diamondbacks	St. Louis Cardinals

- Postseason – September 30 to October 28

Division Series (ALDS, NLDS)
1	NY Yankees	2
3	Detroit	3
American League
2	Texas	3
4	Tampa Bay	1
1	Philadelphia	2
4	St. Louis	3
National League
2	Milwaukee	3
3	Arizona	2

League Championship Series (ALCS, NLCS)
3	Detroit	2
2	Texas	4
4	St. Louis	4
2	Milwaukee	2

World Series
AL2	Texas	3
NL4	St. Louis	4

Higher seed had home field advantage during Division Series and League Championship Series.
The National League champion has home field advantage during the World Series as a result of the NL victory in the All-Star Game.

=== Other Champions ===
- Minor League Baseball
  - AAA
    - Championship: Columbus Clippers (Cleveland Indians)
      - International League: Columbus Clippers (Cleveland Indians)
      - Pacific Coast League: Omaha Storm Chasers (Kansas City Royals)
    - Mexican League: Tigres de Quintana Roo
  - AA
    - Eastern League: New Hampshire Fisher Cats (Toronto Blue Jays)
    - Southern League: Mobile BayBears (Arizona Diamondbacks)
    - Texas League: San Antonio Missions (San Diego Padres)
  - A
    - California League: Lake Elsinore Storm (San Diego Padres)
    - Carolina League: Frederick Keys (Baltimore Orioles)
    - Florida State League: Daytona Cubs (Chicago Cubs)
    - Midwest League: Quad Cities River Bandits (St. Louis Cardinals)
    - South Atlantic League: Greensboro Grasshoppers (Florida Marlins)
    - New York–Penn League: Staten Island Yankees (New York Yankees)
    - Northwest League: Vancouver Canadians (Toronto Blue Jays)
  - Rookie
    - Appalachian League: Johnson City Cardinals (St. Louis Cardinals)
    - Gulf Coast League: GCL Yankees (New York Yankees)
    - Pioneer League: Great Falls Voyagers (Chicago White Sox)
    - Arizona League: AZL Dodgers (Los Angeles Dodgers)
  - Arizona Fall League: Salt River Rafters
- Independent baseball leagues
  - American Association: Grand Prairie AirHogs
  - Atlantic League: York Revolution
  - CanAm League: Québec Capitales
  - Frontier League: Joliet Slammers
  - North American League: Edmonton Capitals
  - Pecos League: Roswell Invaders
- Amateur
  - College
    - College World Series: South Carolina
    - NCAA Division II: West Florida
    - NCAA Division III: Marietta
    - NAIA: Concordia (California)
  - Little League World Series: Huntington Beach, California
- International
  - National teams
    - Baseball World Cup: Netherlands
    - Pan American Games: Canada
    - Southeast Asian Games: Philippines
    - Pacific Games: Northern Mariana Islands
  - International club team competitions
    - Asia Series: Samsung Lions (Korea)
    - Caribbean Series: Yaquis de Obregón (Mexico)
    - European Champion Cup Final Four: San Marino
  - Domestic leagues
    - Australian Baseball League: Perth Heat
    - China Baseball League: Tianjin Lions
    - Cuban National Series: Pinar del Río
    - Dominican League: Toros del Este
    - France – Division Elite: Rouen Huskies
    - Holland Series: Amsterdam Pirates
    - Italian Baseball Series: San Marino
    - Japan Series: Fukuoka SoftBank Hawks
      - Pacific League: Fukuoka SoftBank Hawks
      - Central League: Chunichi Dragons
    - Korea Series: Samsung Lions
    - Mexican League: Yaquis de Obregón
    - Puerto Rican League: Criollos de Caguas
    - Taiwan Series: Uni-President 7-Eleven Lions
    - Venezuelan League: Caribes de Anzoátegui

== Awards and honors ==
BBWAA awards

- Baseball Hall of Fame honors
  - Three individuals were elected and subsequently inducted—players Roberto Alomar and Bert Blyleven by the Baseball Writers' Association of America, and executive Pat Gillick in voting by separate panel of the Veterans Committee.
  - Bill Conlin received the J. G. Taylor Spink Award for excellence in writing.
  - Roland Hemond received the Buck O'Neil Lifetime Achievement Award for excellence as a talent evaluator and in building winning teams.
  - Dave Van Horne received the Ford C. Frick Award for excellence in broadcasting.
- MVP Award
  - American League – Justin Verlander (DET)
  - National League – Ryan Braun (MIL)
- Cy Young Award
  - American League – Justin Verlander (DET)
  - National League – Clayton Kershaw (LAD)
- Rookie of the Year
  - American League – Jeremy Hellickson (TB)
  - National League – Craig Kimbrel (ATL)
- Manager of the Year Award
  - American League – Joe Maddon (TB)
  - National League – Kirk Gibson (AZ)
- Silver Slugger Awards

American League			National League
Player	Team	Position	Player	Team
David Ortiz	Boston Red Sox	DH / Pitcher	Daniel Hudson	Arizona Diamondbacks
Alex Avila	Detroit Tigers	Catcher	Brian McCann	Atlanta Braves
Adrián González	Boston Red Sox	1st baseman	Prince Fielder	Milwaukee Brewers
Robinson Canó	New York Yankees	2nd baseman	Brandon Phillips	Cincinnati Reds
Adrián Beltré	Texas Rangers	3rd baseman	Aramis Ramírez	Chicago Cubs
Asdrúbal Cabrera	Cleveland Indians	Shortstop	Troy Tulowitzki	Colorado Rockies
José Bautista	Toronto Blue Jays	Outfielder	Ryan Braun	Milwaukee Brewers
Jacoby Ellsbury	Boston Red Sox	Outfielder	Matt Kemp	Los Angeles Dodgers
Curtis Granderson	New York Yankees	Outfielder	Justin Upton	Arizona Diamondbacks

- Gold Glove Awards

American League			National League
Player	Team	Position	Player	Team
Mark Buehrle	Chicago White Sox	Pitcher	Clayton Kershaw	Los Angeles Dodgers
Matt Wieters	Baltimore Orioles	Catcher	Yadier Molina	St. Louis Cardinals
Adrián González	Boston Red Sox	1st baseman	Joey Votto	Cincinnati Reds
Dustin Pedroia	Boston Red Sox	2nd baseman	Brandon Phillips	Cincinnati Reds
Adrián Beltré	Texas Rangers	3rd baseman	Plácido Polanco	Philadelphia Phillies
Erick Aybar	Los Angeles Angels	Shortstop	Troy Tulowitzki	Colorado Rockies
Alex Gordon	Kansas City Royals	Left fielder	Gerardo Parra	Arizona Diamondbacks
Jacoby Ellsbury	Boston Red Sox	Center fielder	Matt Kemp	Los Angeles Dodgers
Nick Markakis	Baltimore Orioles	Right fielder	Andre Ethier	Los Angeles Dodgers

=== Others ===
- Woman Executive of the Year (major or minor league): Marla Terranova Vickers, Montgomery Biscuits, Southern League

Major Leagues

- All-Star Game MVP – Prince Fielder (NL, MIL)
- Babe Ruth Award – David Freese (STL)
- Branch Rickey Award – Shane Victorino (NL, PHI)
- Comeback Player of the Year Awards – Jacoby Ellsbury (AL, BOS) / Lance Berkman (NL, STL)
- Delivery Man of the Year Award – José Valverde (DET)
- Edgar Martínez Award – David Ortiz (BOS)
- Hank Aaron Award – José Bautista (AL, TOR) / Matt Kemp (NL, LAD)
- Hutch Award – Billy Butler (KC)
- J. G. Taylor Spink Award – Bill Conlin
- League Championship Series MVP Awards – Nelson Cruz (AL, TEX) / David Freese (NL, STL)
- Luis Aparicio Award – Miguel Cabrera (DET)
- Roberto Clemente Award – David Ortiz (BOS)
- Roy Campanella Award – Matt Kemp (LAD)
- Tip O'Neill Award – Joey Votto (CIN) / John Axford (MIL)
- Tony Conigliaro Award – Tony Campana (CHC)
- Warren Spahn Award – Clayton Kershaw (LAD)
- World Series MVP Award – David Freese (NL, STL)
- Players Choice Award
  - Player of the Year Justin Verlander (DET)
  - Marvin Miller Man of the Year – Michael Young (AL, TEX)
  - Outstanding Players – Curtis Granderson (AL, NYY) / Matt Kemp (LAD)
  - Outstanding Pitchers – Justin Verlander (AL, DET) / Clayton Kershaw (NL, LAD)
  - Outstanding Rookies Mark Trumbo (AL, LAA) / Craig Kimbrel (NL, ATL)
  - Comeback Players of the Year Jacoby Ellsbury (AL, BOS) / Lance Berkman (NL, STL)
- Sporting News Awards
  - Comeback Player of the Year – Jacoby Ellsbury (AL, BOS) / Lance Berkman (NL, STL)
  - Executive of the Year – Dave Dombrowski (AL, DET) / Doug Melvin (NL, MIL)
  - Player of the Year – Justin Verlander (DET)
  - Pitchers of the Year – Justin Verlander (AL, DET) / Clayton Kershaw (NL, LAD)
  - Manager of the Year – Joe Maddon (AL, TB) / Kirk Gibson (NL, AZ)
  - Relievers of the Year – Mike Adams (SD/TEX) / Jason Motte (STL)
  - Rookies of the Year – Mark Trumbo (AL, LAA) / Craig Kimbrel (NL, ATL)

Minor Leagues

- Baseball America Minor League Player of the Year Award – Mike Trout (LAA)
- International League MVP Award – Russ Canzler (TB)
- Joe Bauman Award – Bryan LaHair (CHC)
- Pacific Coast League MVP Award – Bryan LaHair (CHC)
- USA Today Minor League Player of the Year Award – Paul Goldschmidt (AZ)

== Events ==
=== January ===
- January 1 – Baltimore Orioles relief pitcher Alfredo Simón is arrested in connection to the shooting death of his cousin, Michael Castillo Almonte, 25, in the city of Luperon in Puerto Plata, Dominican Republic. Almonte's 17-year-old younger brother Starlling Castillo is also injured in the incident. According to Simon, he was firing celebratory shots in the air as part of the New Year's custom in the Dominican Republic. He is denied bail on February 1.
- January 3 – Former National League Cy Young Award winner Brandon Webb joins the American League champion Texas Rangers, signing a one-year contract worth $3 million with another $5 million in incentives.
- January 5
  - Roberto Alomar and Bert Blyleven are elected to the National Baseball Hall of Fame. Barry Larkin is the highest vote recipient not to receive the 75% requirement. He is named on 62.1% of the ballots.
  - Third baseman Adrián Beltré signs a six-year deal with the Texas Rangers worth $96 million.
- January 6 – First baseman Derrek Lee signs with the Baltimore Orioles for one year.
- January 8
  - During an open house for constituents hosted by U.S. Rep. Gabby Giffords of Arizona, 22-year-old gunman Jared Lee Loughner kills six people, including U.S. District Judge John Roll, Giffords' aide Gabe Zimmerman and 9-year-old Christina-Taylor Green, daughter of Los Angeles Dodgers scout John Green, and granddaughter of former big league manager Dallas Green.
  - Tampa Bay Rays players Matt Garza, Fernando Perez and Zach Rosscup are dealt to the Chicago Cubs for Christopher Archer, Brandon Guyer, Hak-Ju Lee, Robinson Chirinos and Sam Fuld.

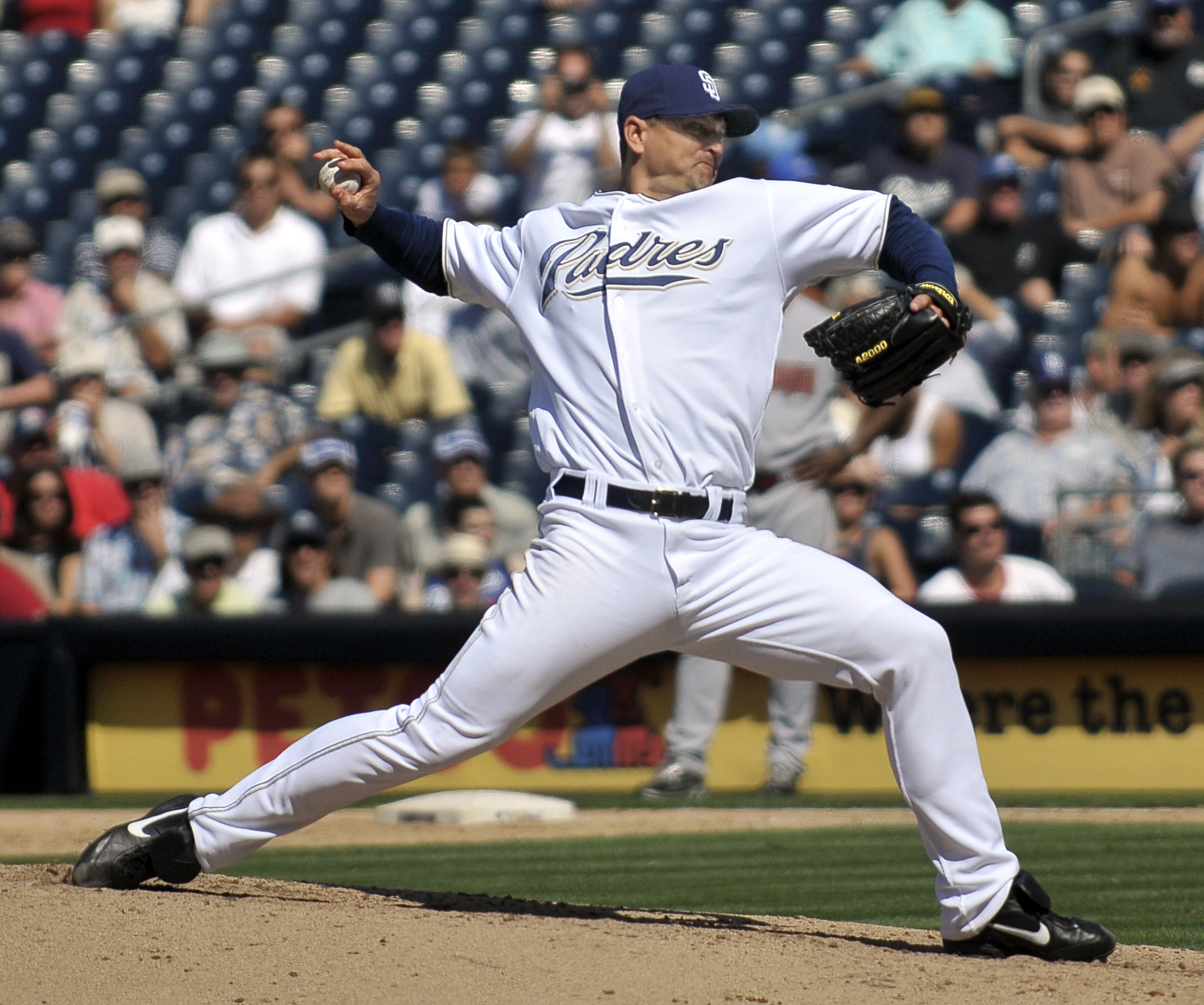
Trevor Hoffman retired with an MLB record 601 saves

- January 10 – After four injury-plagued seasons, 1996 Major League Baseball draft number one overall pick Kris Benson announces his retirement.
- January 11 – Trevor Hoffman, the all-time saves leader (601), announces his retirement.
- January 18
  - Seattle Mariners outfielder Milton Bradley is arrested in Los Angeles for allegedly making criminal threats against a woman.
  - Rather than face another shoulder surgery, Kansas City Royals pitcher Gil Meche announces his retirement despite a guaranteed contract that calls for a $12 million salary in 2011.
- January 21 – The Toronto Blue Jays outfielder Vernon Wells is dealt to the Los Angeles Angels for catcher Mike Napoli and outfielder Juan Rivera. The Jays then send Napoli to the Texas Rangers for reliever Frank Francisco and cash considerations on January 25.
- January 22 – Detroit Tigers team president/general manager Dave Dombrowski announces that the club will retire former manager Sparky Anderson's number 11. The team will wear a blue patch on the right sleeve of their uniforms, bearing "Sparky" and number 11.
- January 24 – Armando Galarraga, who rose to national stardom on June 2, 2010 when he was denied a perfect game by an errant call by umpire Jim Joyce, is traded by the Detroit Tigers to the Arizona Diamondbacks for minor leaguers Kevin Eichhorn and Ryan Robowski.
- January 29 – The Yaquis de Obregón beat the Algodoneros de Guasave in Game 7 of the Mexican Pacific League championship series; this was Obregon's fifth title.

=== February ===
- February 4
  - Irving Picard's lawsuit seeking up to about $1 billion against Fred Wilpon, Jeff Wilpon, Saul Katz and various entities affiliated with the New York Mets and Sterling Equities Associates to recover money for the victims of the Bernie Madoff Ponzi scheme is unsealed by a Manhattan court. The civil suit alleges that the partners in Sterling knew or should have known that Madoff's investment operation was a fraud.
  - After months of speculation, New York Yankees pitcher Andy Pettitte announces his retirement at Yankee Stadium; he would return in 2012 under minor league contract.
- February 7 – Wake Forest University baseball coach Tom Walter donates a kidney to freshman outfielder Kevin Jordan. Jordan is diagnosed in April 2010 with ANCA vasculitis. Walter was tested in December to see if he was a match, and learned January 28 that he was. Jordan was drafted by the New York Yankees in the nineteenth round of the 2010 Major League Baseball draft, and had yet to play for Wake Forest.
- February 12 – Cleveland Indians outfielder Austin Kearns is arrested on charges of driving under the influence near his home in Lexington, Kentucky.
- February 15 – St. Louis Cardinals legend Stan Musial is honored with the Presidential Medal of Freedom by President Barack Obama. Also receiving the award is President George Bush, John H. Adams, Maya Angelou, Warren Buffett, Jasper Johns, Holocaust survivor Gerda Weissmann Klein, Congressman John Lewis, Dr. Thomas Emmett Little, Yo-Yo Ma, Sylvia Mendez, German Chancellor Angela Merkel, NBA star Bill Russell, Jean Kennedy Smith and John Sweeney. Little, who was murdered in 2010 in Afghanistan, is represented by his wife.
- February 17 – Detroit Tigers slugger Miguel Cabrera is arrested in the early morning hours for a DUI. Cabrera's car is discovered parked on the side of a road in Fort Pierce, Florida with Cabrera inside, allegedly intoxicated with a .26 blood alcohol level. When police arrive, he begins drinking from a bottle of Scotch he has on the front seat, and later resists arrest. He issues an apology upon arrival at training camp on February 24, and announces that he is undergoing treatment set up by doctors administered by management and the players' union.
- February 21 – Justine Siegal throws batting practice to Lou Marson, Paul Phillips, Juan Apodaca and five prospects at the Cleveland Indians' Spring training camp in Goodyear, Arizona. She is the first woman to ever throw batting practice to professional hitters.
- February 24 – St. Louis Cardinals general manager John Mozeliak announces that Cy Young Award candidate Adam Wainwright requires Tommy John surgery to replace the ulnar collateral ligament in his right elbow, and thus will miss the entire 2011 season and part of 2012.

=== March ===
- March 2 – Following a three-error first inning, including one by third baseman Aramis Ramírez, Chicago Cubs starter Carlos Silva and Ramirez get into a dugout skirmish. According to Silva, he says "We need to start making plays here" as he leaves the mound and enters the dugout, and Ramírez takes it personally. Silva also gives up two home runs to the Milwaukee Brewers in the inning.
- March 18
  - The New York Mets release veteran second baseman Luis Castillo. In 28 Grapefruit League at-bats, Castillo hit .286 with no extra-base hits, committing one error.
  - It is announced that the Hall of Fame will honor "Talkin' Baseball" composer and singer Terry Cashman this summer as part of induction weekend, 30 years after his song paying homage to Willie Mays, Mickey Mantle and Duke Snider became a ballpark favorite. The 69-year-old Cashman performs his ballpark anthem once again during ceremonies on July 23, the day before Roberto Alomar, Bert Blyleven and Pat Gillick are inducted.
- March 21
  - All-time home runs leader and seven-time National League Most Valuable Player Barry Bonds' perjury trial begins. Bonds faces four charges of perjury and one charge of obstruction of justice.
  - The New York Mets release Óliver Pérez, and absorb the remaining $12 million on the three-year, $36 million deal he signs with the Mets back in 2009.
  - Luis Castillo signs to a Minor League contract with the Philadelphia Phillies.
- March 23 – Opening Day in Nippon Professional Baseball is pushed back a week due to the effects of the 2011 Tōhoku earthquake and tsunami. The Central League agrees to a government request to push back the new season until March 29, a statement from the Central League directors says. The league starts on March 25.
- March 29 – Major League Baseball and its players' union announce a new set of protocols for dealing with concussions, including the creation of a new seven-day disabled list for players with the injury.
- March 31 – San Francisco Giants fan Bryan Stow is beaten in the Dodger Stadium parking lot by two men in Los Angeles Dodgers gear after the Dodgers defeat the Giants 2–1 in the season opener. Stow is left with brain damage, prompting an outpouring of support for the survivor that includes rewards totaling more than $200,000 for information leading to the suspects' arrests.

=== April ===
- April 2
  - Cleveland Indians first baseman/catcher Carlos Santana makes a diving catch of an Alexi Ramirez bunt, and turns it into the first triple play of the season.
  - Former major leaguer Edgar Martínez has two records broken on this day. At Rangers Ballpark in Arlington, in a 12–5 loss to the Texas Rangers, David Ortiz of the Boston Red Sox breaks Martinez' record for most career runs batted in by a designated hitter. His fourth-inning groundout scores Adrián González and gives Ortiz 1,004 RBIs as a DH, surpassing Martinez' record of 1,003. At Oakland–Alameda County Coliseum hours later, Ichiro Suzuki of the Seattle Mariners goes 2-for-5 in the Mariners' 5–2 victory over the Oakland Athletics. The two hits give Suzuki 2,248, breaking Martinez' record of 2,247 hits in a Mariner uniform.
- April 3 – In the Texas Rangers' 5–1 victory over the Boston Red Sox, Ian Kinsler and Nelson Cruz combine to become the first set of teammates to hit home runs in each of the first three games in a Major League season. Kinsler also becomes the first leadoff hitter to hit home runs in each of his team's first two games, bringing his career total of leadoff homers with the Rangers to fifteen, a team's record.
- April 6 – The defense in the Barry Bonds perjury case rests without calling a single witness to the stand. After prosecutors drop one of the five charges against Bonds, and call 25 witnesses to the stand over 2 1/2 weeks, the defense takes just one minute to present its side. Prosecutors drop the count accusing Bonds of lying to a grand jury in 2003 when he said prior to that season he never took anything other than vitamins from trainer Greg Anderson.
- April 8
  - Tampa Bay Rays slugger Manny Ramírez retires. After testing positive for a banned substance for the second time in his career during Spring training, he informs Major League Baseball that he will retire rather than face a 100-game suspension.
  - The University of California announces that its varsity baseball program, eliminated in 2010, has been reinstated.
- April 9 – During the Pittsburgh Pirates game against the Colorado Rockies, 41-year-old Scott Ashley is tasered by Pittsburgh Police after being beaten six times. Ashley is the second fan to be tasered during a Major League game.
- April 11 – The Yuma Scorpions of the North American League name Jose Canseco manager and twin brother Ozzie Canseco bench coach and hitting coach. Both brothers also play for Yuma.
- April 13 – The jury deciding the federal case against Barry Bonds finds him guilty of obstruction of justice. The jury is hung on the three counts of making false declarations during his 2003 testimony before the Bay Area Laboratory Co-Operative (BALCO) grand jury, resulting in a mistrial.
- April 15 – Lenny Dykstra is arrested by Los Angeles police at his Encino, California home on suspicion of trying to buy a stolen car. Prosecutors later decline to file charges; however, he is transferred to federal authorities on unrelated charges of illegally removing and selling personal property from his $18 million mansion without permission of a bankruptcy trustee, according to a federal criminal complaint filed on April 22. He is released on $150,000 bond on April 20, and ordered to seek outpatient substance abuse treatment, as authorities say he has cocaine and ecstasy in his possession when he is originally arrested.
- April 16 – The Inland Empire 66ers come back from a 16–7 deficit, scoring 17 combined runs, en route to a 24–19 victory over the Bakersfield Blaze. Every player in the 66ers starting lineup has multiple hits, and all ten who bat in the ballgame score at least once. The game takes four hours and 55 minutes, the longest in California League history.

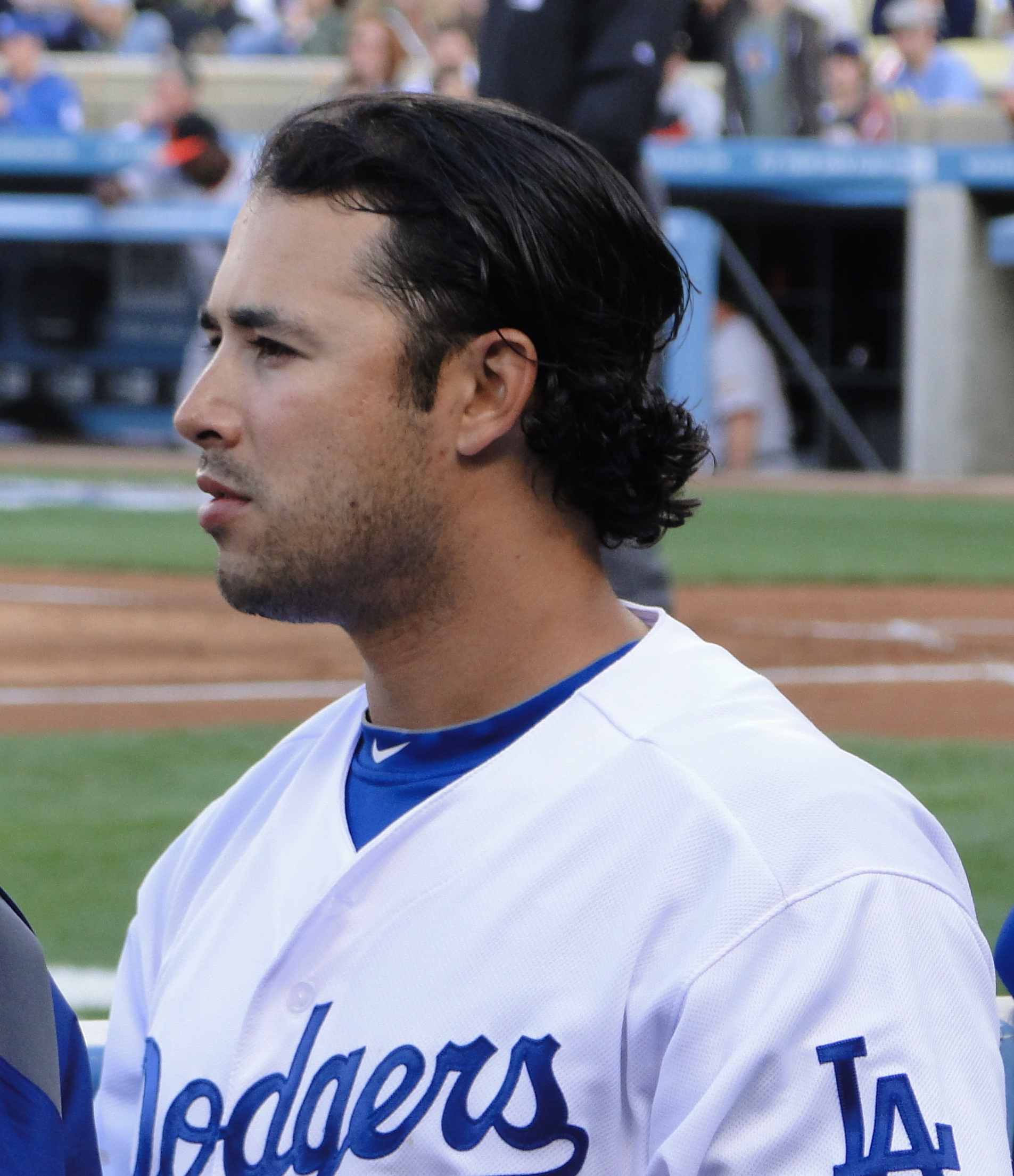
Dodgers outfielder Andre Ethier set a major league record for the month of April with a 26-game hitting streak

- April 17 – In Cincinnati, Andrew McCutchen opens the game with a home run against Edinson Vólquez, then singles home the tiebreaking run in the eighth inning, rallying Pittsburgh to a 7–6 win over the Cincinnati Reds. McCutchen and José Tábata start the game with back-to-back homers, the third time that has happened in Pirates history. Pete Coscarart and James Russell did it against the Boston Braves in 1945, and Omar Moreno and Johnny Ray against the Houston Astros in 1982.
- April 20 – Commissioner Bud Selig announces that Major League Baseball will take over operations of the Los Angeles Dodgers from owner Frank McCourt.

Pursuant to my authority as Commissioner, I informed Los Angeles Dodgers owner Frank McCourt today that I will appoint a representative to oversee all aspects of the business and the day to day operations of the club. I have taken this action because of my deep concerns regarding the finances and operations of the Dodgers and to protect the best interests of the club, its great fans and all of Major League Baseball. My office will continue its thorough investigation into the operations and finances of the Dodgers and related entities during the period of Mr. McCourt's ownership. I will announce the name of my representative in the next several days. The Dodgers have been one of the most prestigious franchises in all of sports, and we owe it to their legion of loyal fans to ensure that this club is being operated properly now and will be guided appropriately in the future.

- April 22 – Against the Colorado Rockies at Sun Life Stadium, Aníbal Sánchez of the Florida Marlins has a bid for a second career no-hitter broken up in the ninth as Dexter Fowler singles to lead off the inning. The hit is the only one Sánchez will allow as Fowler is doubled up on Jonathan Herrera's fly ball, then Carlos González grounds out to Sánchez to end the game. Sánchez, who no-hit the Arizona Diamondbacks on September 6, 2006, was bidding to become the first pitcher to pitch multiple no-hitters in a Marlin uniform.
- April 23 – Atlanta Braves pitching coach Roger McDowell is accused of making homophobic comments and crude gestures toward fans during batting practice before a game against the Giants in San Francisco. The Braves place McDowell on administrative leave on April 29. Pitching coach duties are taken over by Braves Minor League pitching coordinator Dave Wallace.
- April 24 – The Texas League's San Antonio Missions defeat the Midland RockHounds 21–8. It is the third time San Antonio scores at least twenty runs in April (23–10 over the Tulsa Drillers on April 11, and 26–5 over the Northwest Arkansas Naturals on April 15).
- April 25
  - Baseball commissioner Bud Selig appoints former Texas Rangers president Tom Schieffer to oversee the Los Angeles Dodgers' business and financial operations.
  - Chicago Cubs shortstop Starlin Castro commits three errors in the second inning of the Cubs' 5–3 loss to the Colorado Rockies.
  - Los Angeles Angels pitcher Jered Weaver pitches a complete-game shutout of the Oakland A's to improve his record to 6–0 with a 0.99 ERA and 49 strikeouts. He is the first pitcher to go 6–0 by April 25, and is the fourth player in Major League history to go 6–0 in March and April, the last being Brandon Webb with the Arizona Diamondbacks in 2008. It is the fifth time a pitcher does this, with Randy Johnson having done it twice.
- April 26 – Los Angeles Dodgers right fielder Andre Ethier establishes a major league record for the month of April by extending his hitting streak to 23 games, surpassing former manager Joe Torre's 1971 record for the longest hitting streak during the month of April. The streak would ultimately last thirty games, ending on May 7 against the New York Mets.
- April 27 – Chicago White Sox manager Ozzie Guillén is ejected for arguing a called third strike on Paul Konerko with home plate umpire Todd Tichenor in a 3–1 loss to the New York Yankees. Following his ejection, Guillen posts on his Twitter account,

This one is going to cost me a lot of money this is patetic.

and

Today a tough guy show up at Yankee Stadium.

Guillen is fined $50,000 and receives a two-game suspension. According to MLB rules, all social media messages must stop thirty minutes prior to the first pitch, and they can resume after the game at the individual club's discretion. His fine is later reduced to $20,000.

- April 28
  - In a sweep of a doubleheader with the Minnesota Twins, the Tampa Bay Rays' Ben Zobrist goes seven-for-ten, collecting ten RBIs. He sets a club record with eight RBIs in the opener, on a home run and two doubles, and hits a two-run home run in the second game. Zobrist is just the fourth player to record at least seven hits and ten RBIs in a single day since RBIs become an official statistic in 1920. The other three are Jim Bottomley (1929 Cardinals), Pete Fox (1935 Tigers) and Nate Colbert (1972 Padres).
  - Atlanta Braves pitcher Derek Lowe is charged with drunken driving. A Georgia State Patrolman stops Lowe's vehicle upon seeing it race another car down an Atlanta street. The trooper detects the odor of an alcoholic beverage and administers a field sobriety test, which Lowe fails.

=== May ===
- May 1 – At the end of the eighth inning of ESPN's Sunday Night Baseball broadcast between the New York Mets and Philadelphia Phillies, ESPN's Dan Shulman announces that Osama bin Laden, mastermind behind the terrorist attacks of September 11, 2001, has been killed by U.S. Special Forces in Pakistan. As news spreads throughout Citizens Bank Park, the sellout crowd begins chanting the U-S-A! cheer. The Mets go on to win the game, 2–1 in 14 innings.
- May 3 – At U.S. Cellular Field, Francisco Liriano of the Minnesota Twins pitches the first no-hitter of the season over the Chicago White Sox. Despite walking six batters, he is helped out by three double plays. A fourth-inning home run by Jason Kubel off Edwin Jackson (himself a no-hit pitcher on June 25, 2010) accounts for the game's only run. The game is Liriano's first complete game in 95 Major League starts and the first no-hitter by a Twin since Eric Milton in 1999 (fifth Minnesota no-hitter in their 50-year history). The White Sox, meanwhile, were also no-hit by the Kansas City Royals' Bret Saberhagen in 1991.
- May 7 – At Rogers Centre, the Detroit Tigers' Justin Verlander no-hits the Toronto Blue Jays 9–0, the second no-hitter of the season. Verlander's no-hitter occurs just four days after Francisco Liriano (see above) pitched a no-hitter against the Chicago White Sox. Verlander retires the first 22 batters he faces before a walk to J. P. Arencibia spoils his bid for a perfect game. Arencibia is then erased on Edwin Encarnación's double play ground ball, allowing Verlander to face the minimum 27 batters. The no-hitter is the second in Verlander's career; he also no-hit the Milwaukee Brewers on June 12, 2007. Verlander becomes the second Tigers pitcher since Virgil Trucks, and the thirtieth pitcher in the history of baseball, to throw multiple no-hitters. Like the White Sox, victims of Liriano's no-hitter four days earlier, the Blue Jays were also no-hit in 1991, on May 1 by Nolan Ryan—the seventh and last no-hitter of Ryan's career.
- May 12 – In a 9–5 victory over the Colorado Rockies, the New York Mets' Carlos Beltrán clubs three home runs, hitting at least one from each side of the plate. He is the eighth Met to accomplish this feat. The others are José Reyes, Edgardo Alfonzo, Gary Carter, Darryl Strawberry, Claudell Washington, Dave Kingman and Jim Hickman.
- May 13 – Minnesota Twins legend Harmon Killebrew announces that his esophageal cancer has progressed to the point where he is no longer able to fight the disease, and that he will settle into hospice care for the final days of his life. He dies at his home in Scottsdale, Arizona on May 17, with his wife, Nita, and their family at his side.

It is with profound sadness that I share with you that my continued battle with esophageal cancer is coming to an end. With the continued love and support of my wife, Nita, I have exhausted all options with respect to controlling this awful disease. My illness has progressed beyond my doctors' expectation of cure.

- May 14 – Alex Cabrera of the Fukuoka SoftBank Hawks hits his 350th career home run in Japanese baseball. At 1,169 games, Cabrera is the quickest player in NPB history to 350 homers. Previously, he was also the quickest to hit 150 homers (380th game); 200 homers (538th game); 250 homers (733rd game; tied with Ralph Bryant), and 300 homers (934th game). Cabrera also missed being the quickest to 100 homers by one game (Bryant holds the record at 246 games).
- May 15 – In the fifth annual Civil Rights Game, the Atlanta Braves defeat the Philadelphia Phillies, 3–2, at Turner Field in Atlanta.
- May 18 – The San Francisco Giants are named the "Professional Sports Team of the Year" by Street & Smith's Sports Business Journal and Sports Business Daily at the 2011 Sports Business Awards Ceremony in New York City. Target Field, home of the Minnesota Twins, is named "Sports Facility of the Year".

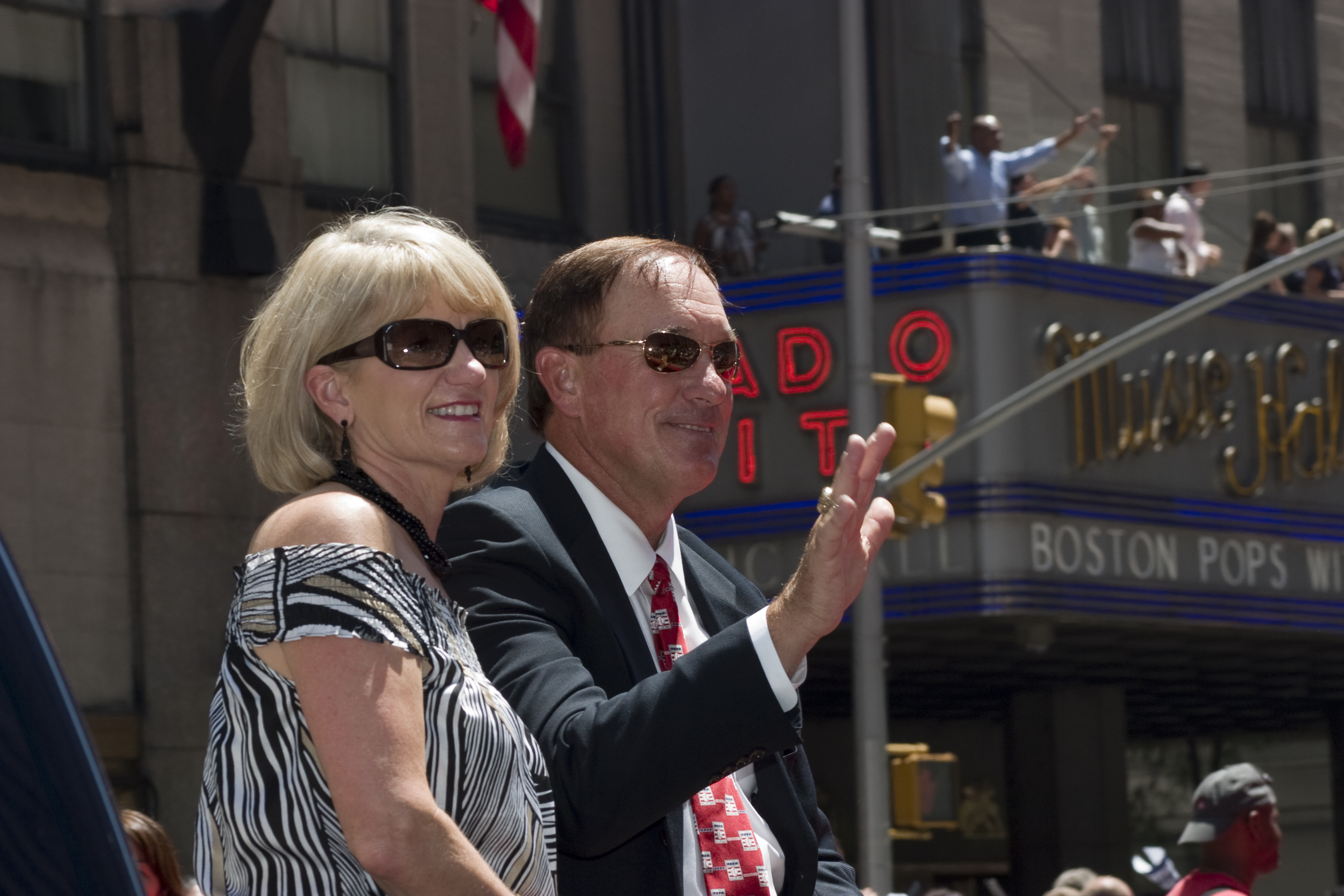
Hall of famer Gary Carter & his wife, Sandy

- May 20 – Four "very small" tumors are discovered on the brain of Hall of Fame catcher Gary Carter during an MRI. Preliminary results from biopsies performed on a single tumor on May 27 at Duke University determine that it appears to be malignant. He dies in 2012, at the age of 57.
  - Randy Poffo known by his ring name Randy Savage during his time in WWE is killed when he loses control of his Jeep Wrangler and crashes into a tree he is 58. Savage spent four seasons in the Cardinals organization.
- May 21 – At U.S. Cellular Field, Mark Buehrle records his 24th career interleague victory as the Chicago White Sox defeat the Los Angeles Dodgers 9–2. Buehrle breaks the first-place tie he shared with Jamie Moyer for most career interleague wins.
- May 25
  - The New York Yankees' Mariano Rivera becomes the first pitcher in MLB history to make 1,000 appearances with one team, reaching the milestone by retiring the side in the ninth inning of the Yankees' 7–3 win over the Toronto Blue Jays. Rivera also becomes the 15th pitcher in MLB history with 1,000 career appearances.
  - The Philadelphia Phillies defeat the Cincinnati Reds 5–4 in nineteen innings. Phillies second baseman Wilson Valdez (who joins the Reds the following year) pitches the nineteenth inning for Philadelphia to pick up his first career win. Raúl Ibañez hits a sacrifice fly in the bottom of the inning with one out and the bases loaded to drive in Jimmy Rollins.
- May 26 – The New York Mets agree to sell a minority, non-operating investment in the team to David Einhorn, president of Greenlight Capital Inc., for $200 million, pending the completion of exclusive negotiations and approval by Major League Baseball owners. The deal gives him a one-third stake in the team and has an option to own sixty percent in three years.
- May 27 – Brandon Crawford hits a go-ahead grand slam in his first major league game, helping Tim Lincecum and the San Francisco Giants beat the Milwaukee Brewers, 5–4, at Miller Park.

=== June ===
- June 1 – World Baseball Classic Inc. announces the introduction of a play-in round for the 2013 World Baseball Classic that allows twelve new countries to compete for the first time. The new round brings in sixteen teams divided into four pools, and the winner of each pool advances to play in the World Baseball Classic. Canada, Chinese Taipei, Panama and South Africa compete in the play-in round after not winning a game in the 2009 World Baseball Classic. New participants are France, Spain, Great Britain, Germany, New Zealand, Colombia, Nicaragua, Brazil, Israel, Thailand, the Czech Republic and the Philippines.
- June 2 – On the first anniversary of Armando Galarraga's near-perfect game, Major League Baseball puts a rule into effect that Jim Joyce, the first-base umpire whose incorrect call cost Galarraga the perfect game, cannot umpire any games in which Galarraga's team plays. The two had become business partners after releasing a book on the game, and this relationship was seen to affect Joyce's impartiality while umpiring Galarraga's team. This rule is similar to the one that prevents Jim Wolf from being the home plate umpire in games in which his younger brother Randy pitches.
- June 6 – The hard-throwing UCLA tandem of Gerrit Cole (1) and Trevor Bauer (3), respectively selected by Pittsburgh and Arizona, marks the first time since 1978 that two college teammates are taken in the top three picks of the annual Draft. Arizona State had earned the honor last time, with Bob Horner and Hubie Brooks taken first and third overall.
- June 7 – Yuma Scorpions player/manager Jose Canseco enters a game against the Lake County Fielders at pitcher. He faces four batters, striking out one. It is the first time Canseco pitches in a professional game since he famously pitched an inning for the Texas Rangers on May 29, 1993, injured his arm, and was shut down for the remainder of the season. The Fielders defeat the Scorpions 10–4.
- June 10 – At Miller Park, Tony La Russa of the St. Louis Cardinals manages his 5,000th game, joining Connie Mack (7,755) as the only managers to reach this milestone. The Milwaukee Brewers, however, shut out the Cardinals 8–0.
- June 19 – With the Florida Marlins on a nine-game losing streak, and having won only one game in the month of June (June 10 against the Arizona Diamondbacks), manager Edwin Rodríguez resigns. Marlins bench coach Brandon Hyde replaces Rodriguez for the evening's game (a 2–1 loss to the Tampa Bay Rays that brought the team's losing streak to ten games). The following day, the Marlins name Jack McKeon interim manager. At 80 years old, he is the oldest manager in National League history, and second-oldest in Major League history after only Connie Mack, who managed the Philadelphia Athletics in 1950 at age 87.
- June 20 – In his return to managing, Florida Marlins manager Jack McKeon benches star shortstop Hanley Ramírez for being late to a team meeting.
- June 21 – The Minnesota Twins begin their game against the San Francisco Giants with four singles and four doubles off Madison Bumgarner. The eight consecutive hits to open a game ties a major league record. Bumgarner is lifted after giving up Ben Revere's second hit of the first inning.
- June 23 – Following a 1–0 victory over the Seattle Mariners at Nationals Park, Washington Nationals manager Jim Riggleman steps down as manager of the team. After the team had won eleven of its last twelve games, Riggleman discusses picking up his option for 2012 with general manager Mike Rizzo. When Rizzo refuses, the team accepts his resignation. On the topic, Rizzo states the following:

The timing of it, that he resigned at this time when we're playing so well and coming off a homestand that we should be celebrating ... I'm disappointed that this is a distraction. This is not thinking of the team first, it's thinking of personal things first. That's what disappoints me the most.

- June 24 – Washington Nationals interim manager John McLaren is ejected in the eighth inning of his only game at the helm. The Nats go on to defeat the Chicago White Sox 9–5 in fourteen innings. Davey Johnson is named manager of the Washington Nationals the following day.
- June 26 – The Detroit Tigers officially retire former manager Sparky Anderson's number 11 jersey.
- June 27 – Unable to make their $40 million payroll obligations for the week, the Los Angeles Dodgers file for Chapter 11 bankruptcy protection in a Delaware court. Chapter 11 filings are also made for LA Real Estate LLC, an affiliated entity that owns Dodger Stadium, and three other related holding companies. Meanwhile, on the field, the Dodgers put up fifteen runs and collect 25 hits while shutting out the Minnesota Twins at Target Field. The 25 hits are the most by any team in the Majors this season and match a Dodgers club record, last reached on May 19, 2006 against the Los Angeles Angels. It is the first time in Los Angeles Dodgers history that every player in the lineup has at least one hit, one run and one RBI.
- June 28 – The South Carolina Gamecocks defeat the Florida Gators 5–2 at TD Ameritrade Park to win their second consecutive College World Series.
- June 29 – The Detroit Tigers hit five home runs against the New York Mets, yet lose despite the fact that the Mets hit none. It is the first time since August 8 2007 a team wins despite being out-homered by at least five (Tampa Bay Rays over the Baltimore Orioles). With their 16–9 victory, the Mets set a team record with 52 runs scored in a four-game span. They have 69 hits during this stretch.
- June 30 – Second baseman Mark Ellis is dealt from the Oakland A's to the Colorado Rockies for right-handed pitcher Bruce Billings and a player to be named later.

=== July ===
- July 7
  - Texas Rangers left fielder Josh Hamilton tosses a foul ball to Shannon Stone, a fan in the stands at Rangers Ballpark, during the second inning of their 6–0 victory over the Oakland A's. After reaching over the railing and catching the ball, Stone falls approximately twenty feet head first from section 5 in the left field lower reserved seats into the opening behind the out-of-town scoreboard. He is immediately attended to by emergency personnel and taken to John Peter Smith Hospital in Fort Worth. Witnesses say Stone is conscious after landing and speaks about his six-year-old son, Cooper, being left alone. Stone goes into full arrest on the way, and is pronounced dead at the hospital; an autopsy rules the cause as blunt force trauma from the fall.
  - The Baltimore Orioles and Boston Red Sox are embroiled in a bench-clearing brawl when Orioles closer Kevin Gregg throws three inside pitches, then says something and makes a gesture to Red Sox slugger David Ortiz to run out his sacrifice fly. Both are immediately ejected, along with Red Sox catcher Jarrod Saltalamacchia and Orioles reliever Jim Johnson. The following day, Red Sox pitcher John Lackey hits Nick Markakis and Derrek Lee with pitches in his team's 4–0 victory. Red Sox manager Terry Francona and rookie starter Kyle Weiland are ejected from the game on the 10th after Weiland throws at two Orioles batters. Orioles reliever Mike Gonzalez later throws a pitch behind Ortiz, and is immediately ejected along with O's manager Buck Showalter. Gregg and Ortiz are given four game suspensions, with Gregg fined $2,500 as well. Gonzalez is fined $1,500 and suspended three games, and Showalter is suspended one game, which he served in the Orioles' series opener against the Cleveland Indians on the 14th. Johnson also receives a $500 fine, and Lackey is fined an undisclosed amount.
- July 9 – At Yankee Stadium, Derek Jeter of the New York Yankees becomes the 28th member of the 3,000 hit club, homering off David Price in the third inning of the Yankees' 5–4 victory over the Tampa Bay Rays. Jeter becomes the first player to reach the milestone exclusively as a Yankee, and only the second to do so with a home run, joining Wade Boggs in 1999. He also becomes the first player to go 5-for-5 the day of achieving his 3000th hit and only the second to collect five hits in the game, joining Craig Biggio in 2007. In the eighth inning, his fifth hit scores Eduardo Núñez with the winning run.
- July 12 – Prince Fielder's fourth inning three-run home run leads the NL past the AL in the 82nd All-Star Game at Chase Field. Shortly after Fielder is named the All-Star Game MVP, his team, the Milwaukee Brewers, announces that they have acquired reliever Francisco Rodríguez from the New York Mets for two players to be named later.
- July 14 – The Roger Clemens perjury trial is declared a mistrial by Judge Reggie Walton on just the second day of testimony after the government introduces evidence before the jury that Walton rules inadmissible.
- July 15 – At Turner Field, the Atlanta Braves defeat the Washington Nationals 11–1 for the 10,000th victory in franchise history. The franchise, which began in Boston from 1876 and moved to Milwaukee in 1953 and Atlanta in 1966, becomes the third franchise to win 10,000 games in its history, joining the New York/San Francisco Giants (10,489) and Chicago Cubs (10,277).
- July 20 – Hideki Matsui clubs his 168th Major League home run. Coupled with the 332 he hit while playing with the Yomiuri Giants of Nippon Professional Baseball (1993–2002), Matsui becomes the first player in the history of baseball to collect 500 home runs spread out over both leagues.
- July 26 – Columbus Clippers pitcher Justin Germano hurls a perfect game against the Syracuse Chiefs. It is the first perfect game in the 35-season history of the Clippers, and the first in the International League since Bronson Arroyo tossed one for the Pawtucket Red Sox in 2003.
- July 26–27 – The Atlanta Braves and Pittsburgh Pirates play a nineteen-inning marathon (the longest game in either franchise's history) that ends in the early morning hours. The winning run scores when, with one out and runners on second and third, Braves pitcher Scott Proctor grounds to shortstop Ronny Cedeño. Cedeño throws home to attempt to retire Julio Lugo and it appears that his throw reaches catcher Michael McKenry and the tag is made well short of home plate. Lugo, however, gets up from his slide, touches home, and is called safe by home plate umpire Jerry Meals, ending the game.
- July 27
  - The Chicago White Sox acquire relief pitcher Jason Frasor and pitching prospect Zach Stewart from the Toronto Blue Jays for pitcher Edwin Jackson and third baseman Mark Teahen. About two hours later, the Blue Jays send Jackson (without letting him play games with the Blue Jays) to the St. Louis Cardinals, with relievers Octavio Dotel and Marc Rzepczynski and outfielder Corey Patterson and three players to be named later or cash, for outfielder Colby Rasmus, left-handers Brian Tallet and Trever Miller and right-hander P. J. Walters.
  - The San Francisco Giants acquire outfielder Carlos Beltrán from the New York Mets for minor league pitching prospect Zack Wheeler.
  - The Los Angeles Angels' Ervin Santana no-hits the Cleveland Indians. Despite not giving up a hit, his team is down 1–0 until a fifth-inning sacrifice fly by Mike Trout, as Ezequiel Carrera reaches base on an error by shortstop Erick Aybar in the first, proceeds to steal second, reaches third on Asdrúbal Cabrera's ground out, and scores on a wild pitch. The Angels win by a final score of 3–1.
- July 28 – Three-RBI games by Lucas Duda and Jason Bay give the New York Mets a 10–9 win over the Cincinnati Reds to complete a four-game sweep at Great American Ball Park. It is the first sweep of a four-game series against the Reds in their history.
- July 29 – The Philadelphia Phillies acquire outfielder Hunter Pence from the Houston Astros for minor league pitchers Jarred Cosart and Josh Zeid, first baseman Jonathan Singleton and a player to be named later. Both Cosart and Singleton are with the Class A Clearwater Threshers and both are ranked on Baseball America's Midseason Top 50 prospects list, with Singleton placing at number 41 and Cosart at number 43.
- July 30
  - In the second game of a doubleheader, the New York Yankees set a franchise record for most runs in the first inning of a game with twelve in their 17–3 win over the Baltimore Orioles.
  - The Pittsburgh Pirates acquire first baseman Derrek Lee from the Baltimore Orioles for minor league first baseman Aaron Baker.
  - The Detroit Tigers deal pitchers Charlie Furbush and Chance Ruffin, outfielder Casper Wells, and third baseman Francisco Martinez to the Seattle Mariners for pitchers Doug Fister and David Pauley.
- July 31
  - After he believes he is being taunted after home runs by Magglio Ordóñez and Carlos Guillén of the Detroit Tigers, Los Angeles Angels pitcher Jered Weaver intentionally throws at Alex Avila's head and is ejected – immediately after both sides are warned. Angels manager Mike Scioscia is also ejected for permitting Weaver to do so. Two days later, Weaver is suspended six games and fined an undisclosed amount, while Scioscia is suspended one game. Weaver appeals the decision.
  - On the final day before the trade deadline, the Cleveland Indians acquire pitcher Ubaldo Jiménez from the Colorado Rockies in exchange for a package of four prospects that include the top two pitching prospects in Cleveland's farm system (pitchers Alex White, Joe Gardner and Drew Pomeranz and first baseman Matt McBride). The Boston Red Sox trade minor league pitchers Stephen Fife and Juan Rodríguez and catcher Tim Federowicz to the Los Angeles Dodgers for outfielder Trayvon Robinson. The Red Sox then send Robinson and outfielder Chih-Hsien Chiang to the Seattle Mariners for Érik Bédard and Minor League reliever Josh Fields. The Dodgers also send shortstop Rafael Furcal to the St. Louis Cardinals for minor league outfielder Alex Castellanos. The Atlanta Braves acquire outfielder Michael Bourn from the Houston Astros for outfielder Jordan Schafer and Minor League pitchers Juan Abreu, Paul Clemens and Brett Oberholtzer. The Arizona Diamondbacks acquire reliever Brad Ziegler from the Oakland A's for first baseman Brandon Allen and reliever Jordan Norberto. The Texas Rangers acquire reliever Mike Adams from the San Diego Padres for pitching prospects Robbie Erlin and Joe Wieland, and reliever Koji Uehara from the Baltimore Orioles for first baseman Chris Davis and pitcher Tommy Hunter. San Diego also sends outfielder Ryan Ludwick to the Pittsburgh Pirates for a player to be named or cash considerations. For the first time since 1998, the Yankees do not make a deadline deal.

=== August ===
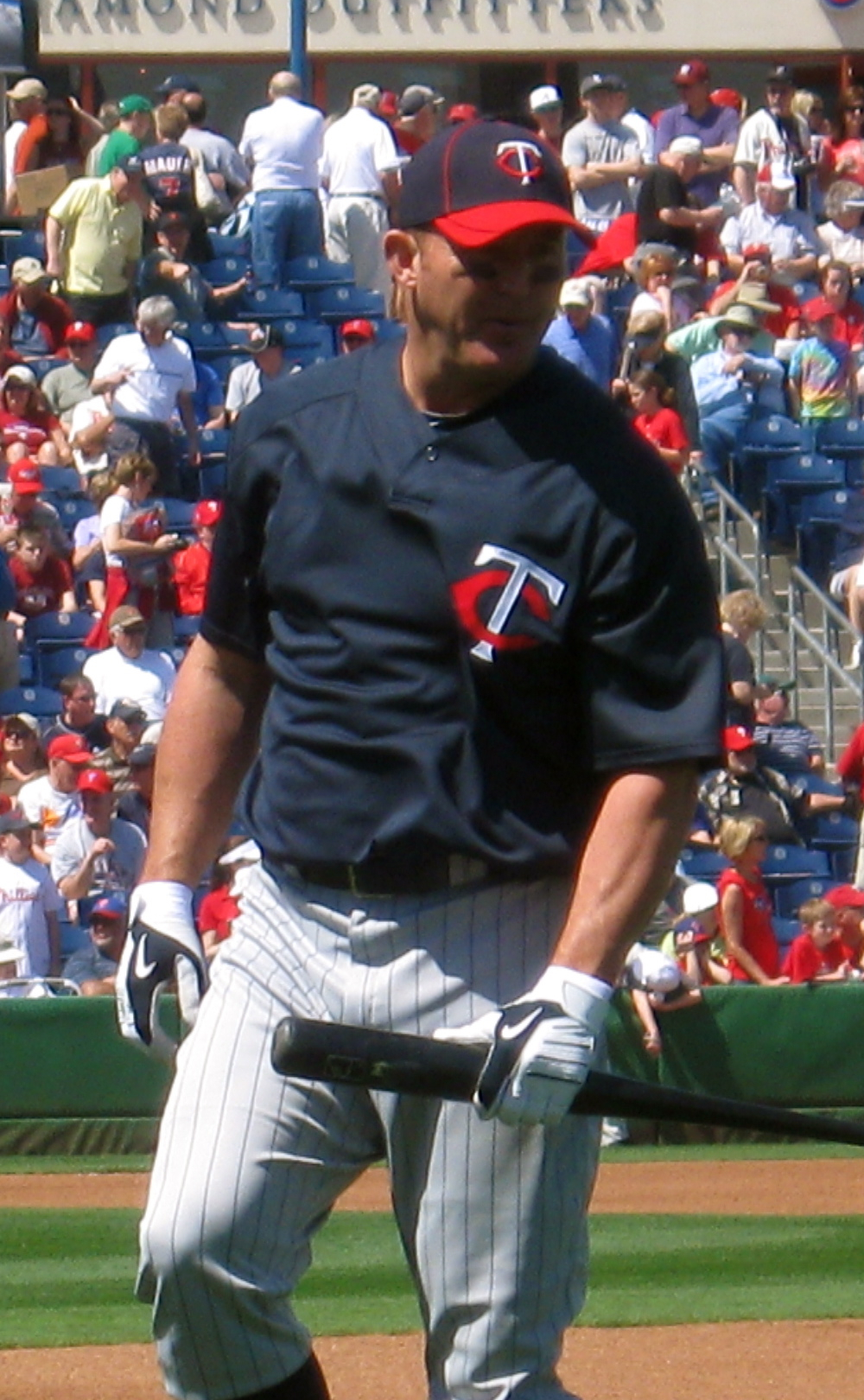
Thome joined the 600 home run on 8/15/11, then rejoined his original franchise on 8/25

- August 2 – Mark Teixeira hits home runs from both sides of the plate for a major league-record 12th time, helping the New York Yankees beat the Chicago White Sox 6–0 in a game shortened to 6.5 innings by rain.
- August 4 – The New York Yankees complete a four-game sweep of the Chicago White Sox at U.S. Cellular Field. It is their first four-game sweep against the White Sox in Chicago since 1976. Yankees pitching also does not allow a base on balls in any of the four games. The last time such a feat was accomplished was by the Boston Red Sox in 1968, also against the White Sox.
- August 12
  - After having given up six earned runs to the Atlanta Braves in the first four innings, Cubs pitcher Carlos Zambrano gives up back-to-back home runs to Freddie Freeman and Dan Uggla (who extends his hitting streak to 32 games) with one out in the fifth. Zambrano is then ejected after throwing two consecutive inside pitches to Atlanta third baseman Chipper Jones (who also hits one of the Braves' five home runs off Zambrano earlier in the game). Following his ejection, Zambrano cleans out his locker at Wrigley Field, and announces his retirement. He later recants, but the Cubs suspend him for 30 games, effectively ending his season. During the off-season, the Cubs trade Zambrano to the Miami Marlins.
  - With a Pablo Sandoval home run in the first inning against the Florida Marlins, the San Francisco Giants hit their 20th consecutive solo home run, breaking a major league record set by the 1914 Philadelphia Phillies. The Giants' last home run with a runner on base was a 2-run shot by Nate Schierholtz on July 6.
- August 15 – At Comerica Park, Jim Thome hits two home runs in the Minnesota Twins' 9–6 victory over the Detroit Tigers, the second of which makes Thome the eighth player with 600 career home runs. After homering off Rick Porcello in the sixth inning, Thome hits his milestone home run off Daniel Schlereth one inning later. Thome becomes the second-fastest player to hit 600 home runs, doing so in his 8,167th at bat; only Babe Ruth needed fewer at-bats with 6,921. He also becomes, at age 40, the oldest player to reach this milestone. Sammy Sosa is previously the oldest, at 38 years, 220 days.
- August 18 – The Colorado Rockies release minor league first baseman Mike Jacobs after he receives a fifty-game suspension for testing positive for human growth hormone. Jacobs becomes the first athlete in any North American professional sport to be suspended for testing positive for HGH.
- August 19 – The Chicago Cubs announce that they have dismissed general manager Jim Hendry and have named assistant GM Randy Bush interim GM. Hendry was promoted to the GM job in the summer of 2002 and was under contract through 2012.
- August 21 – With both Alex Rodriguez and Jim Thome in the line-ups for their respective ball clubs in the final game of a four-game set between the New York Yankees and Minnesota Twins, it is the first match-up of 600 home run club members since Willie Mays and Hank Aaron face off as members of the New York Mets and Atlanta Braves, respectively, on July 17, 1973. Rodriguez and Thome share a handshake at homeplate prior to the game to a huge ovation.
- August 22 – Clinton County, Pennsylvania's Landon Breon and Brandon Miller combine for a no-hitter over Lafayette, Louisiana in the 2011 Little League World Series. The game ends after the top of the fourth due to Little League's ten-run "mercy" rule. Breon pitched the first 3.1 with Miller getting the final two outs. Miller also scored Clinton County's first run with a solo home run in the bottom of the first inning.
- August 25
  - In a 22–9 routing of the Oakland A's, the New York Yankees become the first team in major league history to record three grand slams in one game. The grand slams are hit by Robinson Canó, Russell Martin, and Curtis Granderson.
  - The Minnesota Twins send Jim Thome to the Cleveland Indians for a player to be named later.
- August 26 – Barry Bonds' obstruction of justice conviction is upheld by U.S. District Judge Susan Illston in San Francisco, who denies the former baseball star's motion for a new trial or acquittal on the charge. Meanwhile, Roger Clemens files a motion in the U.S. District Court in Washington, D.C., for sanctions against the prosecutors of his perjury trial for their "egregious error" resulting in a mistrial; the motion seeks dismissal of the case.
- August 27 – Justin Verlander of the Detroit Tigers wins his 20th game of the season, the only pitcher to do so before the end of August since Curt Schilling did so in 2002. He is the first Tigers 20-game winner since Bill Gullickson in 1991. Verlander wins his 20th game in the Tigers' 132nd game of the season, making him the fastest Detroit pitcher to 20 wins since Mickey Lolich got his 20th win in Game No. 131 of the 1972 season.
- August 28 – Derek Jeter plays his 2,402nd game as a Yankee, passing Mickey Mantle as the team's all-time leader in games played.

=== September ===
- September 2 – U.S. District Judge Reggie Walton rules that Roger Clemens will face another trial on charges of lying under oath to a House committee about using performance-enhancing drugs. The new date is set for April 17, 2012.
- September 6 – Chris Parmelee (OF), Joe Benson (OF) and Liam Hendriks (P) all start for the Minnesota Twins in their big-league debuts, a first for the franchise.
- September 11 – José Valverde records his 43rd save of the season, passing Todd Jones as the Detroit Tigers' single season saves leader.
- September 12 – Manny Ramírez is arrested after slapping his wife, Juliana, in their Weston, Florida, home. He is released on $2,500 bail the next day after spending the night in the Broward County Jail.
- September 13
  - At Fenway Park, Tim Wakefield of the Boston Red Sox wins his 200th game on his eighth try. He survives a shaky outing, giving up five runs in six innings, and exits with his team leading 6–5. His teammates assure him of the victory by scoring 12 runs in their last three half-innings, in an 18–6 victory against the Toronto Blue Jays. Wakefield's last victory was on July 24 against the Seattle Mariners.
  - At Safeco Field, Mariano Rivera records his 600th career save as the New York Yankees defeat the Seattle Mariners, 3–2. Rivera enters the game in the ninth inning and allows only a one-out single to Ichiro Suzuki, who is caught trying to steal second base by catcher Russell Martin for the final out.
- September 14 – A first-inning run against the Houston Astros is all the Philadelphia Phillies need as they cruise to a 1–0 victory behind Roy Halladay to become the first team to clinch a playoff spot in the season.
- September 15 – Pablo Sandoval of the San Francisco Giants hits for the cycle in a game against the Colorado Rockies at Coors Field.
- September 16
  - The Detroit Tigers clinch the American League Central Division title, their first since they join the division in 1998, and the team's first title of any kind since 1987. The Tigers become the first team in either league to clinch their division.
  - The Columbus Clippers defeat the Lehigh Valley IronPigs in Game four of the International League Championship Series to capture their second straight Governors' Cup.
  - The Omaha Storm Chasers sweep the Sacramento River Cats to capture their first Pacific Coast League championship.
  - The San Antonio Missions sweep the Arkansas Travelers to capture the Texas League championship.
  - The Frederick Keys score a club-record eleven runs in the third inning to defeat the Kinston Indians, 11–3, to capture the Carolina League championship. It is the Keys' first Mills Cup since 2007.
- September 17
  - New York Yankees closer Mariano Rivera earns his 601st career save, tying him with Trevor Hoffman as the all-time save leader.
  - The Philadelphia Phillies clinch the National League East Division title for the fifth consecutive season.
- September 19 – Mariano Rivera records his 602nd career save in the New York Yankees' 6–4 win over the Minnesota Twins, placing him alone atop Major League Baseball's career saves list.
- September 22 – Upon finding out that he is not able to play winter ball in the Dominican Republic because he is on MLB's inactive list, Manny Ramírez tells ESPN Deportes that he formally requests reinstatement to the major leagues.
- September 25 – At Yankee Stadium, Jacoby Ellsbury crashes two solo home runs off A. J. Burnett in the first half of a day-night doubleheader, to become the first player in Boston Red Sox history to reach the 30 home runs and 30 stolen bases plateaus in the same season. New York takes the opening match, 7–2. In the nightcap, Ellsbury hits a three-run homer off Scott Proctor in the top of the 14th inning, lifting Boston to a 7–4 win over the Yankees.
- September 28
  - Cardinals pitcher Chris Carpenter holds the Houston Astros to just two hits to lead his team to an 8–0 victory, and into the postseason. The Cards had trailed the Atlanta Braves by 10.5 games in the Wild Card race on August 25, but they went on a 23–9 tear since. Meanwhile, the Braves went 11–20, capped off by a thirteen-inning 4–3 loss to the National League Eastern division-winning Philadelphia Phillies in Atlanta to end their season.
  - In the final game of the season, the Tampa Bay Rays rally from a 7–0 deficit against the New York Yankees to tie the game at seven, and head into extra innings. Evan Longoria hits a home run in a six-run eighth, while Dan Johnson hits a solo shot in the ninth to tie it. Longoria's second home run in the 12th wins it for the Rays.
  - Robert Andino's single off Jonathan Papelbon caps off a two-run, two-out rally in the ninth to give the Baltimore Orioles a 4–3 victory over the Boston Red Sox. The Red Sox went 7–20 in the month of September, to go from leading the Wild Card standings by nine games when the month starts to missing the playoffs entirely. They are the first team in history to miss the postseason after having that big a lead in September.
  - The Florida Marlins play their final regular season game at Sun Life Stadium, which was their home since their inaugural 1993 season, and move to Marlins Park the following season.
- September 30:
  - The Tampa Bay Rays storm to a 9–0 victory over the Texas Rangers in game one of the 2011 American League Division Series. Rays starter Matt Moore holds the Rangers to just two hits over seven innings.
  - A match-up of aces CC Sabathia and Justin Verlander for game one of the ALDS at Yankee Stadium is suspended in the middle of the second inning by rain. The game is resumed the following day with would-be game two starters Iván Nova and Doug Fister replacing their respective clubs' aces. The Yankees cruise to a 9–3 victory, highlighted by a Robinson Canó grand slam.
  - The Boston Red Sox announce that they will not pick up the contract option on manager Terry Francona for the next season.
  - Arizona Diamondbacks batting coach Don Baylor is taken to a hospital after fainting at Miller Park while eating breakfast in the clubhouse.
  - The Los Angeles Angels accept the resignation of general manager Tony Reagins, who joined the team as an intern in 1991, and served as GM the past four seasons.

=== October ===
- October 1
  - After allowing three runs in the first inning, Roy Halladay pitches seven scoreless innings to lead the Philadelphia Phillies to an 11–6 victory over the St. Louis Cardinals in Game 1 of the 2011 National League Division Series.
  - The Texas Rangers score five runs in the fifth to defeat the Tampa Bay Rays 8–6 in Game 2 of the ALDS. Rays starter James Shields had allowed just one run in twenty innings against the Rangers all season up to that point.
  - Yovani Gallardo ties a Milwaukee Brewers postseason club record with nine strikeouts to lead his team to a 4–1 victory over the Arizona Diamondbacks.
- October 2
  - Max Scherzer holds the New York Yankees hitless until the sixth inning, as the Detroit Tigers cruise to a 5–3 victory in Game 2 of the ALDS.
  - Despite having been spotted a four-run lead, Cliff Lee is unable to contain the St. Louis Cardinals as they charge back to win Game 2 of the NLDS, 5–4.
  - On the strength of a five-run sixth inning, the Milwaukee Brewers defeat the Arizona Diamondbacks 9–4 in Game 2 of the NLDS.
- October 3
  - Delmon Young breaks a 4–4 tie in the seventh inning with a home run off Rafael Soriano to lead the Detroit Tigers to a 5–4 victory over the New York Yankees in Game 3 of the ALDS.
  - Josh Hamilton's two-run single highlights a four-run seventh inning as the Texas Rangers defeat the Tampa Bay Rays 4–3 to take a two-games-to-one lead in the ALDS.
- October 4
  - Adrián Beltré clubs three home runs to lead the Texas Rangers to a 4–3 victory in the fourth and decisive game of the ALDS.
  - Paul Goldschmidt clubs a grand slam in the fifth inning to lead the Arizona Diamondbacks to their first victory of the 2011 postseason.
  - Ben Francisco breaks a scoreless tie in the seventh inning with a three-run homer off Jaime García to lead the Philadelphia Phillies to a 3–2 victory over the St. Louis Cardinals in Game 3 of the NLDS.
  - Curtis Granderson's diving catch in the first inning helps Yankees starter A. J. Burnett escape a bases-loaded jam. From there, Burnett is nearly flawless in the next 4.2 innings as the New York Yankees cruise to a 10–1 victory over the Detroit Tigers in Game 4 of the ALDS.
- October 5
  - David Freese hits a two-run double and a two-run home run to lead the St. Louis Cardinals to a 5–3 victory over the Philadelphia Phillies, and tie the NLDS at two games apiece.
  - The Arizona Diamondbacks also even their series with the Milwaukee Brewers as Chris Young hits two home runs and Ryan Roberts hits a grand slam.
- October 6
  - Would-be Game 2 starters Doug Fister and Iván Nova face off again, this time with Fister emerging on top as the Tigers win the fifth and decisive game of the ALDS, 3–2. The Yankees use seven pitchers in the game, including CC Sabathia, who gives up the Tigers' third run of the game. Alex Rodriguez becomes the only player in major league history to strike out in his team's final postseason at-bat two consecutive seasons.
  - The Chicago White Sox name Robin Ventura their new manager. Ventura had been working with the club as a special advisor to director of player development Buddy Bell for the past year.
- October 7
  - Andy MacPhail announces he will not return as the Baltimore Orioles' president of baseball operations for the 2012 season.
  - Nyjer Morgan's RBI single in the tenth inning scores Carlos Gómez to give the Milwaukee Brewers a 3–2 victory in the fifth and decisive game of the NLDS.
  - Roy Halladay allows hits to the first two St. Louis Cardinals batters he faces, as Skip Schumaker's double drives in Rafael Furcal to give the Cards the early 1–0 lead. It turns out to be the only scoring of the game as game five of the NLDS lives up to its billing as a pitchers' duel. Halladay holds St. Louis scoreless the rest of the way, while Chris Carpenter holds the Philadelphia Phillies to just three hits in a complete-game victory to send the Cardinals to the National League Championship Series.
- October 8 – Justin Verlander gives up three runs in four innings of work as the Texas Rangers defeat the Detroit Tigers 3–2 in Game 1 of the 2011 American League Championship Series. C. J. Wilson gives up two runs in the rain-interrupted fifth inning before giving way to Alexi Ogando, who pitches two innings out of the bullpen to earn the win.
- October 9 – Losing 5–2, the Milwaukee Brewers score six in the fifth inning to defeat the St. Louis Cardinals 9–6 in Game 1 of the 2011 National League Championship Series.
- October 10
  - Nelson Cruz hits the first walk-off grand slam home run in postseason history and the Texas Rangers win 7–3 in Game 2 of the ALCS.
  - Albert Pujols goes four-for-five with a home run and five RBIs to lead the St. Louis Cardinals to a 12–3 victory in Game 2 of the NLCS.
- October 11
  - San Francisco Giants fan Bryan Stow, the survivor of the March 31 beating in the Dodger Stadium parking lot by two Los Angeles Dodgers fans, is transferred to a rehabilitation facility after nearly seven months in hospitals.
  - Víctor Martínez, Jhonny Peralta and Miguel Cabrera hit home runs behind strong pitching from Doug Fister to carry the Detroit Tigers to a 5–2 victory in Game 3 of the ALCS.
- October 12
  - The St. Louis Cardinals score four runs in the first inning, and hold on for a 4–3 victory in Game 3 of the NLCS. It is the fifth consecutive time that the Cardinals score in the first inning this postseason.
  - A run-scoring single by Mike Napoli is followed by a three-run home run by Nelson Cruz, as the Texas Rangers win Game 4 of the ALCS 7–3 in eleven innings.
- October 13
  - Ryan Raburn leads off the Tiger half of the sixth inning with a single. Followed by a double, triple and home run by Miguel Cabrera, Víctor Martínez and Delmon Young, respectively, it is the first natural four-player cycle in postseason history. Detroit beats the Texas Rangers 7–5 in Game 5 of the ALCS.
  - Despite being named National League Comeback Player of the Year, Lance Berkman is not in the lineup for Game 4 of the NLCS, as his St. Louis Cardinals lose, 4–2. Jacoby Ellsbury brings home American League honors.
- October 14 – Four errors by the Milwaukee Brewers lead to three unearned runs as the St. Louis Cardinals win Game 5 of the NLCS, 7–1. The four errors are the most in a playoff game since the Atlanta Braves committed four in Game 4 of the 2001 National League Championship Series.
- October 15
  - Behind the strength of a nine-run third, the Texas Rangers win the American League Championship Series with a 15–5 victory over the Detroit Tigers.
  - The Netherlands defeats Cuba 2–1 to win the 2011 Baseball World Cup, becoming the first European team to win the Baseball World Cup since 1938.
- October 16 – A four-run first and four-run fourth power the St. Louis Cardinals to a 12–6 victory in Game 6 to win the 2011 National League Championship Series.
- October 19 – Chris Carpenter earns his eighth career postseason win in Game 1 of the 2011 World Series, passing Bob Gibson as the Cardinals' winningest pitcher in the postseason.
- October 22 – Albert Pujols joins Babe Ruth and Reggie Jackson as the only players to hit three home runs in a World Series game as the St. Louis Cardinals win Game 3 of the series, 16–7. Pujols collects a record 14 total bases, while tying World Series records for most hits in a game (5) and RBIs (6). He also becomes the first player in World Series history to get hits in four consecutive innings. The Cards put two runs or more on the board in a record four straight innings (4th through 7th), while also scoring in six consecutive innings (4th through 9th).
- October 25 – The Chicago Cubs introduce former Boston Red Sox general manager Theo Epstein as their new president, while the Red Sox name Ben Cherington the team's executive vice president/general manager.
- October 27 – The St. Louis Cardinals win a memorable Game 6 of the 2011 World Series in 11 innings. They trailed twice by two runs, in both the 9th and 10th innings, yet came back to tie the game, and then win it in the 11th inning on a David Freese solo home run leading off the inning, to dead centerfield. The home run is called by Joe Buck who says "We will see you tomorrow night" the same call made by his father Jack Buck 20 years ago calling Kirby Puckett's walk-off home run in Game 6 of the 1991 World Series
- October 28 – The St. Louis Cardinals win their 11th World Series title, defeating the Texas Rangers 6–2 at Busch Stadium. Third baseman David Freese is named Series MVP and is awarded a new 2012 Chevrolet Corvette. The game would be the last of Cardinals manager Tony La Russa's 33-year career as he announces his retirement 3 days later.
- October 29 – The Los Angeles Angels hire Jerry Dipoto as their new general manager. Dipoto becomes the 11th GM in club history.
- October 30 – MLB All-Stars arrive in Taipei for the beginning of the 2011 Taiwan All-Star Series. With Bruce Bochy at the helm, the American team includes players such as Robinson Canó, Curtis Granderson, Jeremy Guthrie, LaTroy Hawkins, Logan Morrison, Josh Reddick and Pablo Sandoval.
- October 31 – Tony La Russa retires as manager of the St. Louis Cardinals, three days after winning a dramatic, seven-game World Series against the Texas Rangers. La Russa retires third on the all-time wins list (2,728), trailing only Connie Mack (3,731) and John McGraw (2,763). In addition to this season, La Russa won World Championships in Oakland in 1989 and St. Louis in 2006.

=== November ===
- November 1
  - NL & AL Gold Glove award winners are announced.
    - NL winners include Los Angeles Dodgers pitcher Clayton Kershaw, St. Louis Cardinals catcher Yadier Molina, Cincinnati Reds first baseman Joey Votto and second baseman Brandon Phillips, Philadelphia Phillies third baseman Plácido Polanco, Colorado Rockies shortstop Troy Tulowitzki, and the Arizona Diamondbacks' Gerardo Parra and the Dodgers' Matt Kemp and Andre Ethier in the outfield.
    - The AL winners are Chicago White Sox pitcher Mark Buehrle, Baltimore Orioles catcher Matt Wieters, the Boston Red Sox's Adrián González at first and Dustin Pedroia at second, the Texas Rangers' Adrián Beltré at third, Los Angeles Angels shortstop Erick Aybar, and the Kansas City Royals' Alex Gordon, the Red Sox's Jacoby Ellsbury and the Orioles' Nick Markakis in the outfield.
  - Los Angeles Dodgers owner Frank McCourt agrees to sell the team. The sale not only includes the club and Dodger Stadium but also the media rights.
- November 2 – The Chicago Cubs fire manager Mike Quade after just one full season at the helm in which he leads the team to a 71–91 record in 2011. His overall record is 95–104.
- November 6 – The Baltimore Orioles sign Dan Duquette to a three-year deal to become the general manager. Duquette, 53, was out of baseball since being dismissed by the Boston Red Sox in 2002.
- November 7 – The Kansas City Royals trade outfielder Melky Cabrera to the San Francisco Giants for pitcher Jonathan Sánchez, upgrading their starting rotation and clearing the way for prospect Lorenzo Cain to get a chance in center field.
- November 9 – Washington Nationals catcher Wilson Ramos is kidnapped by four gunmen from the front yard of his mother's home in Valencia in his native Venezuela. He is rescued by Venezuelan authorities on November 11 during an air operation in the mountains in the state of Carabobo, roughly 40 miles northwest of where he is abducted.
- November 11 – At 9:00 pm, the Florida Marlins are officially renamed the Miami Marlins. They move to Marlins Park the next year.
- November 14
  - At 11:00 am, the St. Louis Cardinals announce Mike Matheny as their new manager.
  - The Los Angeles Dodgers sign Matt Kemp to an eight-year extension worth $160 million.
- November 17 – Major League Baseball owners approve the sale of the Houston Astros to a group led by private equity fund company CEO Jim Crane, with the sale conditional on the team moving to the American League beginning in 2013.
- November 21 – Seattle Mariners OF Greg Halman is found fatally stabbed in an apartment in Rotterdam.

=== December ===
- December 5 – The Hall of Fame announces the results of voting by the Golden Era Committee, a component of the Veterans Committee. After considering 10 nominees whose greatest contributions to the sport came from 1947 to 1972, the panel elects Ron Santo to the Hall. He will be formally inducted on July 22, 2012.
- December 6 – The Hall of Fame announces Bob Elliott of the Toronto Sun as the 2012 recipient of the J. G. Taylor Spink Award from the Baseball Writers' Association of America. He will formally receive the honor at the Hall of Fame Awards Presentation on July 21, 2012.
- December 7 – The Hall of Fame announces Tim McCarver, the lead analyst for Major League Baseball on Fox since 1996, as the 2012 recipient of its Ford C. Frick Award for broadcasting excellence. He will formally receive the honor at the Hall of Fame Awards Presentation.
- December 8 – The Los Angeles Angels of Anaheim win the Albert Pujols sweepstakes, signing the free agent to the second-highest contract amount in baseball history: $254 million over 10 years.
- December 16
  - Barry Bonds is sentenced to probation and one-month house arrest following his obstruction of justice conviction arising from the BALCO scandal.
  - Major League Baseball owners ratify a new five-year collective bargaining agreement with the players' union. The MLBPA previously gave its own assent. The agreement provides for testing of human growth hormone, limits signing bonuses for draft picks, and institutes a second wild-card team for each league beginning in 2013.

== Movies ==
- Ballplayer: Pelotero
- Moneyball

== Deaths ==
=== January ===
- January 1 – John L. Rice, 92, American League umpire from 1955 through 1973, who worked in four World Series and three All-Star Games.
- January 6 – Francisco de la Rosa, 44, Dominican relief pitcher for the 1991 Baltimore Orioles.
- January 6 – Ryne Duren, 81, All-Star relief pitcher who played with seven MLB teams from 1954 to 1965, and a key contributor for New York Yankees teams that won the American League Championship in the 1958 and 1960 seasons.
- January 7 – Red Borom, 95, the oldest living former Detroit Tigers player, who was on the Tigers' 1945 World Series champion team.
- January 7 – José Vidal, 70, Dominican outfielder for the Cleveland Indians, Seattle Pilots, and Nishitetsu Lions from 1966 to 1971, and a California League MVP winner in 1963.
- January 9 – Dave Sisler, 79, pitcher who posted a 38–44 record with a 4.33 ERA in 247 games while playing for the Boston Red Sox, Detroit Tigers, Washington Senators and Cincinnati Reds; son of Hall-of-Famer George Sisler, and brother of MLB player, coach and manager Dick Sisler.
- January 15 – Roy Hartsfield, 85, infielder who got into 265 games for 1950–1952 Boston Braves; manager of the Toronto Blue Jays during their first three Major League seasons (1977–1979).
- January 17 – Perry Currin, 82, shortstop for the 1947 St. Louis Browns of the American League.
- January 18 – Sargent Shriver, 95, brother-in-law of John F. Kennedy; U.S. political and diplomat who was a minority owner of the Baltimore Orioles from 1989 to 1993.
- January 18 – George Crowe, 89, first baseman and veteran of Negro leagues who spent nine seasons in the National League with the Boston/Milwaukee Braves (1952–1953, 1955), Cincinnati Redlegs (1956–1958) and St. Louis Cardinals (1959–1961); selected to the 1958 NL All-Star team.
- January 18 – Jerre DeNoble, 87, All-American Girls Professional Baseball League outfielder.
- January 18 – Al Grunwald, 80, pitcher for the 1955 Pittsburgh Pirates and the 1959 Kansas City Athletics.
- January 20 – José Ortiz, 63, Puerto Rican outfielder who hit .301 in 67 games for the White Sox and Cubs from 1969 to 1971.
- January 20 – Gus Zernial, 87, All-Star outfielder who played for the Chicago White, Philadelphia and Kansas City Athletics, and Detroit Tigers during his 11-year MLB career (1949–1959); led the American League with 33 home runs and 129 RBI in 1951.

=== February ===
- February 3 – Ron Piché, 75, Canadian Baseball Hall of Fame pitcher, who posted a 10–16 record and a 4.19 ERA in 134 games for the Milwaukee Braves, Los Angeles Angels, and St. Louis Cardinals from 1960 to 1966.
- February 4 – Woodie Fryman, 70, All-Star pitcher who posted a 141–155 record and a 3.77 ERA for the Pittsburgh Pirates, Philadelphia Phillies, Detroit Tigers, Cincinnati Reds, and Montreal Expos from 1966 to 1983.
- February 8 – Cliff Dapper, 91, catcher for the 1942 Brooklyn Dodgers, who made history after being traded in 1948 by the Dodgers to the Atlanta Crackers of the Southern Association for broadcaster Ernie Harwell, to become the only player in major league baseball history traded for a broadcaster.
- February 8 – Tony Malinosky, 101, infielder for the 1937 Brooklyn Dodgers, who was the oldest-living major league player.
- February 11 – Chuck Tanner, 81, managed the Pittsburgh Pirates for nine seasons (1977–1985), winning the World Series championship in 1979; also managed Chicago White Sox (1970–1975), Oakland Athletics (1976) and Atlanta Braves (1986–1988); in his playing days, an outfielder for Milwaukee Braves, Chicago Cubs, Cleveland Indians and Los Angeles Angels from 1955 to 1962.
- February 12 – Gino Cimoli, 81, first player to bat for the Dodgers after their move to Los Angeles in 1958; later an outfielder on the Pittsburgh Pirates' 1960 World Series championship team; got into 969 games for seven MLB clubs between 1956 and 1965.
- February 14 – Cecil Kaiser, 94, oldest living Negro leagues star.
- February 15 – Joe Frazier, 88, outfielder who spent parts of four seasons in the majors with four clubs between 1947 and 1956; later managed the New York Mets from 1976 to May 30, 1977.
- February 18 – Len Gilmore, 93, pitcher for the 1944 Pittsburgh Pirates.
- February 18 – Forrest "Spook" Jacobs, 85; second baseman who played from 1954 through 1956 for the Philadelphia/Kansas City Athletics and the Pittsburgh Pirates.
- February 18 – Buddy Lewis, 94, All-Star third baseman/outfielder who hit .297 in 1,349 games over 11 seasons for the Washington Senators (1935–1941, 1945–1947 and 1949).
- February 20 – Andrew Baur, 66, co-owner and treasurer of the St. Louis Cardinals from 1996 until his death.
- February 26 – Greg Goossen, 65, catcher who played in 193 games for the New York Mets, Seattle Pilots/Milwaukee Brewers and Washington Senators from 1966 to 1970.
- February 26 – Bill Grigsby, 89, Kansas City sportscaster; spent three seasons (1959–1961) calling Athletics baseball games before moving on to become the longtime voice of the AFL/NFL Kansas City Chiefs.
- February 27 – Duke Snider, 84, Hall of Fame centerfielder of the "Boys of Summer;" key player on the Brooklyn Dodgers team that brought the only World Series crown to Brooklyn in 1955; also won world championship as a member of 1959 Los Angeles Dodgers; played in six different World Series as a Dodger, and hit 11 home runs in 36 Fall Classic games.
- February 28 – Scott Cary, 87, pitcher for the 1947 Washington Senators.
- February 28 – Wally Yonamine, 85, first American to play professional baseball in Japan after World War II (Yomiuri Giants / Chunichi Dragons) and first football player of Asian ancestry to play professional football (San Francisco 49ers).

=== March ===
- March 7 – Frank Dezelan, 81, National League umpire from 1966 to 1970; behind home plate when Willie Mays hit his 600th career home run in 1969; worked at the 1970 All-Star Game that ended with Pete Rose colliding with catcher Ray Fosse at home plate.
- March 9 – Bob McNamara, 94, infielder for the 1939 Philadelphia Athletics, at the time of his death the ninth oldest living major league player.
- March 12 – Mitchell Page, 59, outfielder for the Athletics and Pirates from 1977 to 1984, who later served as the Cardinals' hitting coach between 2001 and 2004.
- March 13 – Jean Smith, 82, All-American Girls Professional Baseball League All-Star.
- March 15 – Marty Marion, 94, eight-time All-Star shortstop and 1944 National League MVP, who also managed the St. Louis Cardinals, St. Louis Browns and the Chicago White Sox.
- March 15 – Fred Sanford, 91, pitcher for the Browns, Yankees and Senators between 1943 and 1951.
- March 16 – Tom Dunbar, 51, outfielder who played from 1983 through 1985 for the Texas Rangers.
- March 18 – Charlie Metro, 91, player, manager, coach and scout; member of the Chicago Cubs' "College of Coaches" in 1962, and "head coach" from June 5 through the end of the 1962 season; second manager in Kansas City Royals history, from April 7 (Opening Day) to June 7, 1970.
- March 19 – Tom McAvoy, 74, pitcher for the 1959 Washington Senators.
- March 19 – Bob Rush, 85, All-Star pitcher who won 127 games for the Chicago Cubs, Milwaukee Braves and Chicago White Sox from 1949 through 1960.
- March 22 – Normie Roy, 82, pitcher for the 1950 Boston Braves.

=== April ===
- April 1 – Lou Gorman, 82, Major League Baseball executive for 47 years; general manager of the Seattle Mariners (1976–1980) and Boston Red Sox (1984–1993).
- April 2 – Tom Silverio, 65, Dominican outfielder who played from 1970 through 1972 for the California Angels.
- April 3 – Amy Irene Applegren, 83, All-American Girls Professional Baseball League pitcher, who hurled a no-hitter and was a member of three championship teams.
- April 3 – Larry Shepard, 92, manager for the Pittsburgh Pirates in 1968 and 1969, later the pitching coach for the Cincinnati Reds team that won the 1975 and 1976 World Series; also coached for Philadelphia Phillies and San Francisco Giants and was a successful minor-league pitcher and manager.
- April 12 – Eddie Joost, 94, All-Star shortstop for the Philadelphia Athletics in the 1940s and 1950s; player-manager of 1954 Athletics, the last season the team spent in Philadelphia; last living member of the Cincinnati Reds team that won the 1940 World Series.
- April 15 – Reno Bertoia, 76, Italian-born Canadian infielder who played 10 years in the Major Leagues, eight of them with the 1950s Detroit Tigers, and a member of the Canadian Baseball Hall of Fame.
- April 15 – Bobo Osborne, 75, first baseman who played for the Detroit Tigers and Washington Senators between the 1957 and 1963 seasons; later a longtime scout; son of Tiny Osborne.
- April 16 – Stanley Glenn, 84, catcher for the Philadelphia Stars of the Negro leagues from 1944 to 1950.
- April 16 – Bill Kinnamon, 91, American League umpire (1960–1969) who worked in the 1962 and 1968 All-Star Games, the 1968 World Series, and umpired at home plate when Roger Maris hit his 61st home run in 1961 to break Babe Ruth's single-season record.
- April 21 – Jim Heise, 78, pitcher for the 1957 Washington Senators.
- April 25 – Bobby Thompson, 57, outfielder for the 1978 Texas Rangers.
- April 25 – Elizabeth Wicken, 83, Canadian outfielder who played from 1945 through 1946 in the All-American Girls Professional Baseball League.
- April 26 – Don Miles, 75, outfielder for the Los Angeles Dodgers during the 1958 season.
- April 27 – Gene Kirby, 95, play-by-play broadcaster and club executive; served as Dizzy Dean's partner on three radio networks for two decades; later, served in front office of three MLB clubs.
- April 30 – Mike Krsnich, 79, outfielder for the Milwaukee Braves during the 1960 and 1962 seasons.
- April 30 – Millito Navarro, 105, first Puerto Rican to play in the Negro leagues, believed to be the oldest living professional baseball player.

=== May ===
- May 6 – Duane Pillette, 88, pitcher who posted a 38–66 record and a 4.40 ERA in 188 games for the New York Yankees, St. Louis Browns, Baltimore Orioles and Philadelphia Phillies from 1949 through 1956; led American League in games lost (14) and earned runs allowed (106) in 1951.
- May 6 – Dick Walsh, 85, who spent 23 years in baseball as a front office executive for the Brooklyn/Los Angeles Dodgers (1948–1966) and California Angels (1968–1971); served as second general manager in Angels' franchise history.
- May 10 – Bill Bergesch, 89, Major League Baseball executive who worked for the St. Louis Cardinals, Kansas City Athletics, New York Mets, New York Yankees and Cincinnati Reds organizations; general manager of the Yankees (1982–1983) and Reds (1984–1987).
- May 10 – Bill Gallo, 88, cartoonist for the New York Daily News for seven decades, whose playful characters included hundreds of baseball gems.
- May 12 – Carlos Pascual, 80, Cuban-born pitcher who posted a 1–1 record and a 2.12 ERA for the 1950 Washington Senators; brother of Camilo Pascual.
- May 13 – Mel Queen, 69, outfielder-turned-pitcher, then a coach and executive; a principal architect of the Toronto Blue Jays' farm system in the 1980s and 1990s; acting manager of 1997 Blue Jays (replacing Cito Gaston) from September 24 to end of season; won 20 of 37 decisions on the mound while hurling for the Cincinnati Reds and California Angels (1966–1972) after breaking into MLB as an outfielder for the 1964 Reds; son of the MLB pitcher.
- May 17 – Harmon Killebrew, 74, Hall of Fame first baseman and outfielder who hit 573 home runs during his 22-year career, most of them with the Washington Senators and Minnesota Twins, for the 11th most in major league history.
- May 20 – Randy Poffo, 58, professional wrestler better known as Randy Savage, who spent four years in the St. Louis Cardinals and Cincinnati Reds minor league systems before embarking upon his legendary wrestling career.
- May 21 – Jim Pyburn, 78, backup outfielder and third baseman who played from 1955 through 1957 for the Baltimore Orioles.
- May 25 – Paul Splittorff, 64, the winningest pitcher in Kansas City Royals history—going 166–143 between 1970 and 1984—who became a popular broadcaster for the team.
- May 25 – Gene Smith, 94, pitcher who hurled three no-hitters during his eight-year career in the Negro leagues.
- May 28 – Bill Harris, 79, Canadian-born pitcher who played in two MLB games—one each for the Brooklyn (1957) and Los Angeles (1959) Dodgers.
- May 28 – Martha Rommelaere, 88, Canadian-born outfielder in the All-American Girls Professional Baseball League.

=== June ===
- June 6 – Eleanor Dapkus, 87, outfielder and pitcher, one of the original players of the All-American Girls Professional Baseball League in its inaugural season of 1943.
- June 7 – José Pagán, 76, Puerto Rican infielder for the San Francisco Giants (1959–1965), Pittsburgh Pirates (1965–1972) and Philadelphia Phillies (1973); drove in the winning run for Pittsburgh in Game 7 of the 1971 World Series; coached for the Pirates from 1974 to 1978.
- June 8 – Jim Northrup, 71, hero of the 1968 World Champion Detroit Tigers, after hitting a grand slam in Game 6 and a tie-breaking two-run triple in Game 7; spent a dozen years in majors, 101/2 of them with the Tigers.
- June 10 – John Braun, 71, relief pitcher for the 1964 Milwaukee Braves.
- June 12 – Chase Riddle, 85, head baseball coach of Troy State University (1979–1990) whose teams won five Gulf Coast Conference championships; earlier, a player, manager and scout in professional baseball for 36 years; as a Cardinals' scout, signed Steve Carlton to his first pro contract.
- June 15 – Ted Gray, 86, All-Star pitcher who played all but one season of his nine-year major league career with the Detroit Tigers.
- June 16 – José Bracho, 82, Venezuelan pitcher and member of two Hall of Fames, who set several records in the Venezuelan League during a 26-year career, while also pitching in Minor league baseball and the Dominican league.
- June 24 – Richie Myers, 81, utility infielder for the 1956 Chicago Cubs.
- June 27 – Elmer Sexauer, 85, relief pitcher in two games for the 1948 Brooklyn Dodgers.
- June 28 – Billy Baldwin, 60, backup outfielder for the Detroit Tigers and New York Mets between the 1975 and 1976 seasons.
- June 28 – Howard Fox, 90, president of the Minnesota Twins (1985–1986) and a 60-plus-year employee of the franchise dating to its time in Washington, D.C.
- June 30 – Don Buddin, 77, shortstop who played between 1956 and 1962 for the Boston Red Sox, Houston Colt .45s and Detroit Tigers.
- June 30 – Ruth Roberts, 84, songwriter who co-wrote Meet the Mets.

=== July ===
- July 4 – Wes Covington, 79, outfielder and minor league call-up who sparked the 1957 Milwaukee Braves down the stretch and helped them win the World Series; also a key member of Philadelphia Phillies between 1961 and 1965; overall, played in 1,075 for six big league teams between 1956 and 1966.
- July 7 – Dick Williams, 82, Hall of Fame manager who posted a 1,571–1,451 record in 21 seasons (1967–1969 and 1971–1988), while leading the Oakland Athletics to a pair of World Series titles in 1972 and 1973; helmed "Impossible Dream" Boston Red Sox to 1967 American League pennant (and named AL Manager of the Year); managed San Diego Padres to a National League title in 1984; also managed California Angels, Montreal Expos and Seattle Mariners; had a 13-season playing career as an outfielder and third baseman for five MLB clubs between 1951 and 1964.
- July 12 – Howard Hilton, 47, relief pitcher for the 1990 Cardinals.
- July 22 – Tex Nelson, 74, outfielder who played from 1955 to 1957 with the Baltimore Orioles.
- July 24 – Mike Palm, 86, pitcher for the 1948 Boston Red Sox.
- July 27 – Hideki Irabu, 42, Japanese pitcher who posted a 34–35 record and a 5.15 ERA for the New York Yankees, Montreal Expos and Texas Rangers from 1997 to 2002.

=== August ===
- August 1 – Joe Caffie, 80, backup catcher for the Cleveland Indians between 1956 and 1957.
- August 1 – Alex Pitko, 96, outfielder for the 1938 Philadelphia Phillies and the 1939 Washington Senators.
- August 2 – Al Federoff, 87, who spent 25 years in the Detroit Tigers organization as a player, manager and scout, including a major league stint with the Tigers as their second baseman from 1951 to 1952.
- August 11 – Joe Trimble, 80, pitcher who played with the Boston Red Sox and Pittsburgh Pirates in the mid-1950s.
- August 11 – Bob Will, 80, outfielder who played from 1957 through 1963 for the Chicago Cubs.
- August 12 – Ernie Johnson, 87, Vermont-born pitcher who played with the Boston and Milwaukee Braves teams before becoming the voice of the Braves on radio and television.
- August 15 – Tōru Shōriki, 92, Japanese businessman and long time owner of the Yomiuri Giants baseball team.
- August 24 – Mike Flanagan, 59, Cy Young Award-winning pitcher and part of the 1983 World Champion Baltimore Orioles; later served as Orioles' general manager (2006–2008) and spent four separate terms as an analyst on the O's television network.
- August 26 – Josephine Figlo, 88, All-American Girls Professional Baseball League ballplayer.
- August 27 – Frank Fanovich, 88, relief pitcher who posted a 0–5 record and a 5.49 ERA in 55 games with the 1949 Cincinnati Reds and the 1953 Philadelphia Athletics.

=== September ===
- September 6 – Malcolm Prine, 83, president of the Pittsburgh Pirates from 1985 to 1987.
- September 7 – Jang Hyo-Jo, 56, Korean outfielder for the Samsung Lions and the Lotte Giants from 1983 to 1992, who set KPB all-time career records with a .331 average and four batting titles that are still intact today.
- September 8 – Jesse Jefferson, 62, pitcher for the Baltimore Orioles, Chicago White Sox, Toronto Blue Jays, Pittsburgh Pirates and California Angels between 1973 and 1981.
- September 12 – Bill Cash, 92, Negro league baseball catcher who also played in the Dominican, Mexican and Venezuelan baseball leagues.
- September 14 – Choi Dong-Won, 63, South Korean pitcher who played for the Lotte Giants and the Samsung Lions between 1983 and 1990, and the first pitcher to earn four wins in Korean Series history.
- September 15 – Dorothy Harrell, 87, one of the premier shortstops of the All-American Girls Professional Baseball League in its twelve-year history.
- September 15 – Bill Taylor, 81, part-time outfielder for the Giants and Tigers in the 1950s and a prolific hitter in eleven minor league seasons, who set two records while playing in the Venezuelan Winter League in the 1953–1954 season, when he became the first player in the league's history to hit three home runs in a single game, and for setting a new season mark with 16 home runs.
- September 23 – Danny Litwhiler, 95, All-Star left fielder who hit .281 in 1,057 games for the Philadelphia Phillies, St. Louis Cardinals, Boston Braves and Cincinnati Reds between 1940 and 1951, who, during the 1941 season, batted at least one home run in every National League ballpark, and became the first outfielder in major league history to play an entire season without committing an error; later, a longtime college baseball coach at Florida State (1955–1963) and Michigan State (1964–1982).
- September 29 – Eddie Bockman, 91, infielder for the Yankees, Indians and Pirates in the 1940s, later a minor league manager and scout, who was credited with signing Bob Boone, Larry Bowa, Buck Martinez, John Vukovich and Bob Walk, among others.

=== October ===
- October 1 – Johnny Schmitz, 90, two-time All-Star pitcher who posted a 93–114 record and a 3.55 ERA for seven MLB clubs between 1941 and 1956; led the National League in strikeouts in 1946 as a member of the Chicago Cubs.
- October 2 – John Romonosky, 82, pitcher who played in the 1950s for the St. Louis Cardinals and Washington Senators.
- October 4 – Martha Haines, 87, All-American Girls Professional Baseball League player.
- October 4 – Ralph Hodgin, 96, outfielder/third baseman who hit .285 in 530 games for the Boston Bees (1939) and Chicago White Sox (1943–44 and 1946–1948).
- October 11 – Cy Buker, 92, relief pitcher for the 1945 Brooklyn Dodgers.
- October 11 – Paul Martin, 79, relief pitcher for the 1955 Pittsburgh Pirates, one of few big leaguers who played their entire careers at the majors level without spending any time in the minor leagues.
- October 13 – George Scherger, 90, minor-league infielder, instructor and manager who spent 14 seasons spanning 1970 to 1986 as an MLB coach for the Cincinnati Reds; member of 1975 and 1976 World Series champions.
- October 16 – Don Williams, 80, relief pitcher for the 1958–59 Pittsburgh Pirates and the 1962 Kansas City Athletics.
- October 17 – Carl Lindner Jr., 92, financier who from 1999 to 2005 was chief executive officer and principal owner of the Cincinnati Reds.
- October 18 – Merritt Ranew, 73, catcher who played between 1962 and 1969 for the Houston Colt .45s, Chicago Cubs, Milwaukee Braves, Los Angeles/California Angels, and Seattle Pilots.
- October 22 – Roy Smalley, 85, shortstop who played 11 MLB seasons with the Chicago Cubs (1948–1953), Milwaukee Braves (1954) and Philadelphia Phillies (1955–1958); his son, also a shortstop, had a 13-year MLB career (1975–1987).
- October 25 – Bert Cueto, 74, pitcher and native of Cuba who worked in seven games for the 1961 Minnesota Twins.
- October 26 – Dave Cole, 81, pitcher who played from 1950 to 1955 with the Boston/Milwaukee Braves, Cubs and Phillies.
- October 28 – Ricky Adams, 52, infielder who played for the California Angels and San Francisco Giants between the 1982 and 1985 seasons.
- October 30 – Mickey Scott, 64, German-born reliever for the Baltimore Orioles, Montreal Expos and California Angels between 1972 and 1977, who also was elected to the Rochester Red Wings Hall of Fame in 1998.

=== November ===
- November 1 – Eilaine Roth, 82, All-American Girls Professional Baseball League player.
- November 3 – Matty Alou, 72, outfielder for the San Francisco Giants, Pittsburgh Pirates, St. Louis Cardinals, Oakland A's, New York Yankees and San Diego Padres who played 1,667 games between 1960 and 1974; National League batting champion (.342) in 1966 who hit over .330 for four consecutive seasons during pitcher-dominated late 1960s; two-time NL All-Star and member of 1972 World Series champion Oakland; made history in 1963, when he joined his brothers Felipe and Jesús to form the only all-brother outfield in major league history: each brother batted in the same half-inning in a game against the New York Mets, on September 10, and five days later, all three Alou brothers made the start in each of the three spots in the Giants' outfield; the three Alous would collect 5,094 combined hits over their careers, beating out the 4,853 hits of Joe, Dom and Vince DiMaggio for the best three-brother total of all time.
- November 3 – Bob Forsch, 61, only pitcher in St. Louis Cardinals history to throw two no-hitters (1978 vs. Phillies and 1983 vs. Expos); won 163 games over his 15-season (1974–1988) Redbird career, including 20 wins in 1977, and 168 games overall; member of 1982 World Series champions and hurled in two other Fall Classics; brother of Ken Forsch; died less a week after he threw out the ceremonial first pitch at Game 7 of the 2011 World Series, won by the Cardinals.
- November 9 – Benny McCoy, 96, second baseman for the Detroit Tigers and Philadelphia Athletics from 1938 through 1941, who was among 91 Detroit minor league players declared free agents in 1939 by baseball commissioner Kenesaw Mountain Landis.
- November 11 – Charlie Lea, 54, French-born American pitcher for the Montreal Expos and Minnesota Twins from 1980 to 1988, who was a two-time All-Star and hurled a no-hitter in 1981.
- November 11 – Nick Strincevich, 96, pitcher for the Boston Bees/Braves, Pirates and Phillies in the 1940s, who was selected for the 1945 All-Star Game, but, due to wartime restrictions, the game was never played.
- November 19 – Sonny Dixon, 87, pitcher for the Senators, Athletics and Yankees from 1953 to 1956.
- November 21 – Greg Halman, 24, Dutch outfielder for the 2010–11 Seattle Mariners, and a member of the 2009 Netherlands national team.
- November 25 – Yukio Nishimoto, 91, Japanese Baseball Hall of Fame player and manager.

=== December ===
- December 5 – Joe Lonnett, 84, backup catcher for the Philadelphia Phillies from 1956 through 1959; later a third-base coach under Chuck Tanner with Chicago White Sox, Oakland Athletics and Pittsburgh Pirates (1971–1984); member of the 1979 World Series champion Pirates.
- December 11 – Mabel Holle, 91, one of the original players to join the All-American Girls Professional Baseball League for its inaugural season in 1943.
- December 12 – Randy Stein, 58, pitcher for the Milwaukee Brewers, Seattle Mariners and Chicago Cubs between the 1978 and 1982 seasons.
- December 15 – Andy Carey, 80, third baseman for the New York Yankees and three other MLB clubs over 11 seasons (1952–1962) who helped preserve Don Larsen's 1956 World Series perfect game against the Brooklyn Dodgers; played for two world champions in four Fall Classic appearances.
- December 18 – Andrés Fleitas, 95, Cuban minor league baseball catcher and member of two Hall of Fames, who batted several .300 seasons, won two MVP awards, and is the only catcher ever to have caught a no-hitter in the Caribbean Series.
- December 19 – Kathleen Malach, 85, All-American Girls Professional Baseball League player.
- December 21 – Bud Bloomfield, 75, backup infielder who played from 1963 to 1964 for the St. Louis Cardinals and Minnesota Twins.
- December 28 – Don Mueller, 84, two-time All-Star right fielder, and a member of the 1954 World Champion New York Giants.
- December 29 – Rosman García, 32, Venezuelan reliever for the Texas Rangers from 2003 to 2004.
- December 30 – Ted Beard, 90, outfielder who played for the Pittsburgh Pirates and the Chicago White Sox for parts of seven seasons spanning 1948–1958.
