= Ron Samford =

American baseball player (1930–2021)

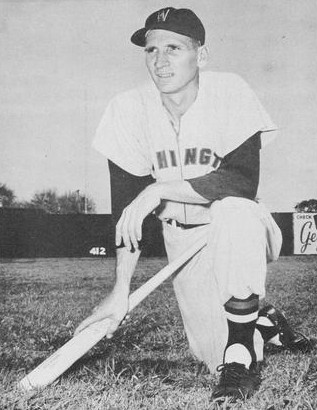
- Samford in 1959
- Shortstop
- Born: February 28, 1930; Dallas, Texas, U.S.
- Died: January 14, 2021 (aged 90); Dallas, Texas, U.S.
- Batted: Right Threw: Right

MLB debut
- April 15, 1954, for the New York Giants

Last MLB appearance
- September 23, 1959, for the Washington Senators

MLB statistics
- Batting average: .219
- Home runs: 5
- Runs batted in: 27
- Stats at Baseball Reference

Teams
- New York Giants (1954); Detroit Tigers (1955, 1957); Washington Senators (1959)

Ronald Edward Samford (February 28, 1930 – January 14, 2021) was an American shortstop in Major League Baseball who played from 1954 to 1959 with the New York Giants, Detroit Tigers and Washington Senators.

== Biography ==
Samford was born in Dallas, Texas. Originally signed by the Giants in 1948, he made his major league debut on April 15, 1954, at the age of 24. He pinch ran for Ebba St. Claire in his debut game. He was used as a pinch runner/defensive replacement in his first three appearances in the majors, so he had to wait until his fourth game to get an actual at bat. He went 0 for 3 in that game, striking out once. He played a total of twelve games that season, collecting no hits in five at bats. He wore number 17 in 1954. At 5 ft 11 in (1.80 m), 156 pounds (71 kg), he played in only one game in 1955, stepping up to the plate once. He failed to get on base—in fact, he struck out. He wore two numbers in 1955, according to Baseball-Almanac—25 and 37.

Samford did not play any major league ball in 1956, so he had to wait until 1957 to collect his first major league hit, which he got on April 30 against the New York Yankees and pitcher Duke Maas. He singled to center field, but the Tigers (who selected him off waivers from the Giants in 1955) lost to Maas in a 10-inning game, 2–1. Maas pitched the entire game. Samford ended up hitting .220 in 54 games for the Tigers that year. He wore 27 in 1957. Again, he failed to make the majors in 1958. On December 6, he was sent from the Tigers with Reno Bertoia and Jim Delsing to the Senators for Eddie Yost, Rocky Bridges and Neil Chrisley.

The 1959 season, in which he wore number 32, would end up being Samford's final season in the majors. He had a .224 batting average, and hit his first career home run (off Ray Herbert on April 28). He also hit an extra-inning game-winning home run that season. It came on June 2 against the Cleveland Indians. The game was tied 2–2 going into the top of the tenth inning, and the batter before him, Hal Naragon, had grounded out. Samford stepped up to the plate with no one on and one out and hit a solo shot off pitcher Bud Podbielan to put the Senators ahead 3–2. The Indians tried to muster a rally in the bottom of the tenth with a Jim Baxes single, but were unable to. They were shut down by Senators pitcher Pedro Ramos, who pitched all 10 innings for the complete game. The next night, Samford hit a home run off Herb Score to help the Senators beat the Indians 4–0.

Samford hit his final home run in his last major league at bat off Ernie Johnson on September 7 against the Baltimore Orioles. It was a three-run shot to cap off a seven-run rally by the Senators in the top of the tenth inning. The Senators won the game 8–1. He played his final major league game on September 23, 1959. He finished his career with a .219 batting average, 5 home runs and 27 runs batted in. In a total of 158 games, he had 334 official at bats, walking 17 times and striking out 46 times. He had a .954 fielding percentage, and was involved in 62 double plays in his career.

Samford died on January 14, 2021, at the age of 90.
