= Ralph Lumenti =

American baseball player (1936–2018)

- Pitcher
- Born: December 21, 1936; Milford, Massachusetts, U.S.
- Died: February 7, 2018 (aged 81); Milford, Massachusetts, U.S.
- Batted: Left Threw: Left

MLB debut
- September 7, 1957, for the Washington Senators

Last MLB appearance
- September 27, 1959, for the Washington Senators

MLB statistics
- Win–loss record: 1–3
- Earned run average: 7.29
- Innings pitched: 33 1/3
- Stats at Baseball Reference

Teams
- Washington Senators (1957–1959)

Raphael Anthony Lumenti (December 21, 1936 – February 7, 2018) was an American professional baseball player. He played in Major League Baseball as a left-handed pitcher for the Washington Senators from 1957 to 1959. He appeared in 13 games played, six as a starting pitcher. He batted left-handed, stood 6 feet 3 inches (1.91 m) tall and weighed 185 pounds (84 kg).

Lumenti attended Boston University and the University of Massachusetts Amherst before signing a bonus contract with Washington on September 2, 1957. He made his debut five days later, pitching a scoreless ninth inning in a 4–1 loss to the New York Yankees at Griffith Stadium. The Bonus Rule then in effect forced the Senators to keep Lumenti on their Major League roster for his first two professional seasons; however, after pitching 11 games in 1957–58, Washington was able to send Lumenti to the Chattanooga Lookouts of the Double-A Southern Association. He made two more appearances in Washington in 1959 before finishing his career in minor league baseball after the 1961 season.

Altogether, Lumenti hurled 33 1/3 innings in MLB, allowed 32 hits and 42 bases on balls, while striking out 30.

Lumenti died on February 7, 2018.
