= John Romonosky =

American baseball player (1929–2011)

- Pitcher
- Born: July 7, 1929; Harrisburg, Illinois, U.S.
- Died: October 2, 2011 (aged 82); Groveport, Ohio, U.S.
- Batted: Right Threw: Right

MLB debut
- September 6, 1953, for the St. Louis Cardinals

Last MLB appearance
- September 11, 1959, for the Washington Senators

MLB statistics
- Win–loss record: 3–4
- Earned run average: 5.15
- Strikeouts: 63
- Stats at Baseball Reference

Teams
- St. Louis Cardinals (1953); Washington Senators (1958–1959)

John Romonosky (July 7, 1929 – October 2, 2011) was an American professional baseball player. A 6 ft 2 in (1.88 m), 195 lb (88 kg) right-handed pitcher, he played parts of three seasons in Major League Baseball, appearing in 32 games for the 1953 St. Louis Cardinals and the 1958–59 Washington Senators. His minor league baseball career spanned 13 seasons between 1949 and 1961.

After his first recall from the minor leagues, Romonosky started two games for the Cardinals at the end of the 1953 campaign, earning no decisions. In fact, in his Major League debut against the Milwaukee Braves, the second game of a Sunday doubleheader at County Stadium, the game ended in a 3–3 tie after eight innings of play. Romonosky allowed three earned runs and seven hits in six innings, with two bases on balls and three strikeouts.

Sent back to the minors by St. Louis for the 1954 season, Romonosky didn't return to the majors until July 1958 as a member of the Senators. He started five games during that month, but won only one game (losing the other four) and he worked out of the bullpen for the remainder of the 1958 campaign, appearing in 18 total MLB games. He began the next season with Washington, and worked in 12 more contests, two as a starter. He posted a career-best 3.29 earned run average that season, but did not pitch in a big-league game after July 27 and spent part of the season with the Double-A Chattanooga Lookouts. However, in his final Major League game in September 1959, he pinch-ran for Senators' slugger Roy Sievers in the eighth inning and scored the winning run in a 5–4 win over the Cleveland Indians at Griffith Stadium.

All told, Romonosky yielded 97 hits and 51 bases on balls in 101⅓ major league innings, with 63 strikeouts.
