= Tom McAvoy =

American baseball player

- Pitcher
- Born: August 12, 1936; Brooklyn, New York, U.S.
- Died: March 19, 2011 (aged 74); Stillwater, New York, U.S.
- Batted: Left Threw: Left

MLB debut
- September 27, 1959, for the Washington Senators

Last MLB appearance
- September 27, 1959, for the Washington Senators

MLB statistics
- Win–loss record: 0–0
- Earned run average: 0.00
- Innings pitched: 2 2/3
- Stats at Baseball Reference

Teams
- Washington Senators (1959)

Thomas John McAvoy (August 12, 1936 – March 19, 2011) was an American professional baseball pitcher who appeared in one game in Major League Baseball for the Washington Senators in 1959. Listed at 6 feet 3 inches (1.91 m) tall and 200 pounds (91 kg), he batted and threw left-handed. He was born in Brooklyn, New York.

Tom McAvoy was signed by the Senators in 1956 and played four seasons in the minor leagues before joining the big team on the final day of the 1959 season.

McAvoy was a player whose baseball career can be loosely described as a cup of coffee. He debuted against the Boston Red Sox on September 27, 1959, at Fenway Park as a replacement for starter Jim Kaat in the second inning, scattering one hit and two walks without strikeouts over 2 2/3 shutout innings and did not have a decision. In that game, McAvoy retired Ted Williams on a grounder to second base. McAvoy never appeared in a major league game again.

In seven minor league seasons, McAvoy posted a 38–72 record and a 4.74 ERA in 176 pitching appearances.

McAvoy died in Stillwater, New York, at the age of 74, following complications from pancreatic cancer.
