= Red Borom =

American baseball player (1915–2011)

- Second baseman
- Born: Edward Jones Borom; October 30, 1915; Spartanburg, South Carolina, U.S.
- Died: January 7, 2011 (aged 95); Dallas, Texas, U.S.
- Batted: Left Threw: Right

MLB debut
- April 23, 1944, for the Detroit Tigers

Last MLB appearance
- September 30, 1945, for the Detroit Tigers

MLB statistics
- Batting average: .250
- Home runs: 0
- Runs batted in: 10
- Stats at Baseball Reference

Teams
- Detroit Tigers (1944–1945)

Career highlights and awards
- World Series champion (1945)

Edward Jones "Red" Borom (October 30, 1915 – January 7, 2011) was an American second baseman who played two seasons in Major League Baseball (MLB) with the Detroit Tigers. Born in Spartanburg, South Carolina, Borom was 28 years old before he made it to the big leagues. He only played one full season in the major leagues, and that season saw him win the 1945 World Series. Borom also played professional and semi-pro baseball for over 15 years from the mid-1930s into the 1950s.

Borom served in the United States Army briefly in 1943, but was released because of migraine headaches. He recalled: "Two days after getting home, I got a call from Jack Zeller, general manager of Detroit ... Four days after getting out of the service, I was in training camp with Detroit in Evansville, Indiana. I realized it was wartime, but there were some good players still in the majors."

In 1945, Borom played the entire season with Detroit. Playing in place of injured second baseman Eddie Mayo, Borom batted over .300 during the September pennant drive.

Borom played in 55 games for the Tigers in 1945, batting .269 with a .307 on-base percentage. He played in two games of the 1945 World Series. Describing his appearance in the World Series, Borom said: "I hit a ground ball up the middle, off the glove of pitcher Hank Borowy. The shortstop, Roy Hughes, threw me out on an extremely close play. I thought I had a base hit." Borom also pinch-ran for catcher Bob Swift in game three.

When asked about his biggest thrill in baseball, Borom responded: "When Hank Greenberg hit the bases-loaded home run against the Browns [in September 1945] and we were behind 3–2 at the time. I was the runner on third, and when I saw the ball headed for the seats and knew we were in the World Series. Nothing could surpass that."

In 1946, as veteran players returned from World War II, Borom did not make Detroit's roster. Borom played several more years of minor league and semipro ball. Borom was involved with two NBC tournament titlists – Wichita's Boeing Bombers in 1942 as player and Sinton, Texas, in 1951 as manager. Reflecting on his career, Red observed, "I guess a career that looked like it was headed nowhere for so long turned out pretty well."

Borom was inducted into the Texas Baseball Hall of Fame in 1978 and the Kansas Baseball Hall of Fame in 1996.

After retiring from baseball, Borom worked 25 years for a freight company in Dallas. He died on January 7, 2011, in Dallas as one of the oldest living former Major Leaguers. He attended Society for American Baseball Research meetings in the DFW area (Hall-Ruggles Chapter) for many years.

== Career highlights ==
- Played on the Tallahassee 1935 Champions of Georgia-Florida League
- Played on the Tallahassee 1939 Champions of Alabama-Florida League
- Played on the Boeing 1942 Champions of national semipro tournament
- Played on the Detroit 1945 World Series Champions
- Played on the Dallas 1946 "Dixie World Series" Champions
- Played on the Plymouth Oil 1951 Champions of national semipro tournament
