= Malcolm Prine =

American baseball executives (1928-2011)

Prine

Malcolm M. Prine (August 12, 1928 – September 6, 2011) served as President of the Pittsburgh Pirates from 1985 to 1987. He was also served as the president and CEO of Ryan Homes.
