= Reno Bertoia =

Italian-born baseball infielder (1935–2011)

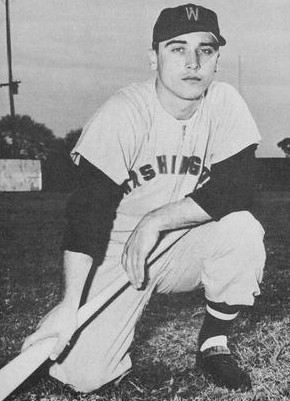
- Bertoia in 1959
- Third baseman
- Born: January 8, 1935; San Vito al Tagliamento, province of Pordenone, region of Friuli-Venezia Giulia, Italy
- Died: April 15, 2011 (aged 76); Windsor, Ontario, Canada
- Batted: Right Threw: Right

MLB debut
- September 22, 1953, for the Detroit Tigers

Last MLB appearance
- April 28, 1962, for the Detroit Tigers

MLB statistics
- Batting average: .244
- Home runs: 27
- Runs batted in: 171
- Stats at Baseball Reference

Teams
- Detroit Tigers (1953–1958); Washington Senators/Minnesota Twins (1959–1961); Kansas City Athletics (1961); Detroit Tigers (1961–1962); Hanshin Tigers (1964)

Member of the Canadian

Baseball Hall of Fame
- Induction: 1988

Reno Peter Bertoia (January 8, 1935 – April 15, 2011) was an Italian Canadian professional baseball player.

== Career ==
Born Pierino, Bertoia moved with his family to Canada from Italy at the age of two and a half and grew up in Windsor, Ontario. His next-door neighbour and role model was Hank Biasatti. Bertoia attended and graduated from Assumption College High School in Windsor. Signed by the Detroit Tigers in 1953, Bertoia continued his education by attending Assumption University from which he graduated in June 1958 while a member of the Tigers. Bertoia also became close friends with Hall of Fame outfielder Al Kaline while with Detroit, and was an important part of Kaline's early years with the Tigers.

In 10 major league seasons he played in 612 games and had 1,745 at bats, 204 runs, 425 hits, 60 doubles, 10 triples, 27 home runs, 171 runs batted in (RBIs), 16 stolen bases, 142 walks, .244 batting average, .303 on-base percentage, .336 slugging percentage, 586 total bases and 31 sacrifice hits.

On May 7, 1958, Bertoia hit a grand slam against the Washington Senators at Griffith Stadium, making him the first Italian-born MLB player to do so.

In January 1964, Bertoia signed to play in the Japanese Central League with the Hanshin Tigers. He asked for his release a few months into the season because his wife was pregnant and had been ill during most of the family's stay in Japan.

After his retirement as a player, Bertoia received his full high school teaching credentials and returned to Windsor, where he worked as a teacher for 30 years with the Windsor Catholic School Board. He was inducted into the Windsor/Essex County Sports Hall of Fame in 1982, the Canadian Baseball Hall of Fame in 1988, the University of Windsor Alumni Sports Hall of Fame in 1988 and the Ontario Baseball Association Hall of Fame in 2025.

Reno Bertoia inspired and served as a central figure in the 2005 coming-of-age novel Reno by Canadian author Marty Gervais. Set in 1957, the book tells the story of a young Northern Ontario boy recovering from polio who escapes isolation by writing to sports icons and celebrities for autographed photos. After taking on the nickname "Reno" in honor of Bertoia, the boy receives letters back from the Detroit Tigers infielder, who is portrayed during his real-life American League batting race against Ted Williams.

Bertoia died on April 15, 2011, of lymphoma in Windsor.
