= 1956 Washington Senators season =

1956 Washington Senators
- League: American League
- Ballpark: Griffith Stadium
- City: Washington, D.C.
- Record: 59–95 (.383)
- League place: 7th
- Owners: Calvin Griffith (majority owner, with Thelma Griffith Haynes)
- General managers: Calvin Griffith
- Managers: Chuck Dressen
- Television: WTTG
- Radio: WWDC (FM) (Arch McDonald, Bob Wolff)

The 1956 Washington Senators won 59 games, lost 95, and finished in seventh place in the American League. They were managed by Chuck Dressen and played home games at Griffith Stadium, where they attracted 431,647 spectators, eighth and last in AL attendance.

== Offseason ==
- November 8, 1955: Mickey Vernon, Bob Porterfield, Johnny Schmitz, and Tom Umphlett were traded by the Senators to the Boston Red Sox for Karl Olson, Dick Brodowski, Tex Clevenger, Neil Chrisley, and Al Curtis (minors).
- February 8, 1956: Mickey McDermott and Bobby Kline were traded by the Senators to the New York Yankees for Lou Berberet, Bob Wiesler, Herb Plews, Dick Tettelbach, and a player to be named later. The Yankees completed the deal by sending Whitey Herzog to the Senators on April 2.

== Regular season ==
- April 18, 1956: Umpire Ed Rommell was the first umpire to wear glasses in a major league game. The game was played between the Senators and the New York Yankees.

=== Season standings ===
American League
Team	W	L	Pct.	GB	Home	Road
New York Yankees	97	57	.630	—	49‍–‍28	48‍–‍29
Cleveland Indians	88	66	.571	9	46‍–‍31	42‍–‍35
Chicago White Sox	85	69	.552	12	46‍–‍31	39‍–‍38
Boston Red Sox	84	70	.545	13	43‍–‍34	41‍–‍36
Detroit Tigers	82	72	.532	15	37‍–‍40	45‍–‍32
Baltimore Orioles	69	85	.448	28	41‍–‍36	28‍–‍49
Washington Senators	59	95	.383	38	32‍–‍45	27‍–‍50
Kansas City Athletics	52	102	.338	45	22‍–‍55	30‍–‍47

=== Record vs. opponents ===
1956 American League record Sources:
Team	BAL	BOS	CWS	CLE	DET	KCA	NYY	WSH
Baltimore	—	6–16	9–13	5–17	13–9	15–7	9–13	12–10
Boston	16–6	—	14–8	13–9–1	12–10	12–10	8–14	9–13
Chicago	13–9	8–14	—	15–7	13–9	14–8	9–13	13–9
Cleveland	17–5	9–13–1	7–15	—	11–11	17–5	10–12	17–5
Detroit	9–13	10–12	9–13	11–11	—	16–6	12–10	15–7–1
Kansas City	7–15	10–12	8–14	5–17	6–16	—	4–18	12–10
New York	13–9	14–8	13–9	12–10	10–12	18–4	—	17–5
Washington	10–12	13–9	9–13	5–17	7–15–1	10–12	5–17	—

=== Opening Day lineup ===
1	Eddie Yost	3B
32	Dick Tettelbach	LF
30	Whitey Herzog	RF
2	Roy Sievers	1B
5	Pete Runnels	2B
10	Lou Berberet	C
3	Karl Olson	CF
36	José Valdivielso	SS
27	Camilo Pascual	P

=== Roster ===
1956 Washington Senators
Roster
Pitchers: 15 Ted Abernathy; 17 Dick Brodowski; 8 Bud Byerly; 16 Bob Chakales; 10,11 Tex Clevenger; 39 Hal Griggs; 38 Connie Grob; 29 Evelio Hernández; 27 Camilo Pascual; 28 Pedro Ramos; 24 Bunky Stewart; 18 Chuck Stobbs; 26 Dean Stone; 21 Bob Wiesler	Catchers: 9,10 Lou Berberet; 14 Clint Courtney; 8 Ed Fitz Gerald; Infielders: 12 Harmon Killebrew; 22 Lyle Luttrell; 25 Herb Plews; 4 Tony Roig; 5 Pete Runnels; 6 Jerry Snyder; 36 José Valdivielso; 1 Eddie Yost	Outfielders: 30 Whitey Herzog; 14,23 Jim Lemon; 3 Karl Olson; 37 Ernie Oravetz; 31,32 Carlos Paula; 2 Roy Sievers; 32,34 Dick Tettelbach; Other batters: 41 Tom Wright	Manager: 7 Chuck Dressen; Coaches: 53 Ellis Clary; 52 Joe Fitzgerald; 54 Billy Jurges; 51 Cookie Lavagetto

== Player stats ==
=== Batting ===
==== Starters by position ====
Note: Pos = Position; G = Games played; AB = At bats; H = Hits; Avg. = Batting average; HR = Home runs; RBI = Runs batted in

Pos	Player	G	AB	H	Avg.	HR	RBI
C	Clint Courtney	101	283	85	.300	5	44
1B	Pete Runnels	147	578	179	.310	8	76
2B	Herb Plews	91	256	69	.270	1	25
SS	José Valdivielso	90	246	58	.236	4	29
3B	Eddie Yost	152	515	119	.231	11	53
LF	Roy Sievers	152	550	139	.253	29	95
CF	Whitey Herzog	117	421	103	.245	4	35
RF	Jim Lemon	146	538	146	.271	27	96

==== Other batters ====
Note: G = Games played; AB = At bats; H = Hits; Avg. = Batting average; HR = Home runs; RBI = Runs batted in

Player	G	AB	H	Avg.	HR	RBI
Karl Olson	106	313	77	.246	4	22
Lou Berberet	95	207	54	.261	4	27
Ed Fitz Gerald	64	148	45	.304	2	12
Jerry Snyder	43	148	40	.270	2	14
Ernie Oravetz	88	137	34	.248	0	11
Lyle Luttrell	38	122	23	.189	2	9
Tony Roig	44	119	25	.210	0	7
Harmon Killebrew	44	99	22	.222	5	13
Carlos Paula	33	82	15	.183	3	13
Dick Tettelbach	18	64	10	.156	1	9
Tom Wright	2	1	0	.000	0	0

=== Pitching ===
==== Starting pitchers ====
Note: G = Games pitched; IP = Innings pitched; W = Wins; L = Losses; ERA = Earned run average; SO = Strikeouts

Player	G	IP	W	L	ERA	SO
Chuck Stobbs	37	240.0	15	15	3.60	97
Camilo Pascual	39	188.2	6	18	5.87	162
Ted Abernathy	5	30.1	1	3	4.15	18
Evelio Hernández	4	22.2	1	1	4.76	9

==== Other pitchers ====
Note: G = Games pitched; IP = Innings pitched; W = Wins; L = Losses; ERA = Earned run average; SO = Strikeouts

Player	G	IP	W	L	ERA	SO
Pedro Ramos	37	152.0	12	10	5.27	54
Dean Stone	41	132.0	5	7	6.27	86
Bob Wiesler	37	123.0	3	12	6.44	49
Bunky Stewart	33	105.0	5	7	5.57	36
Hal Griggs	34	98.2	1	6	6.02	48
Dick Brodowski	7	17.2	0	3	9.17	8

==== Relief pitchers ====
Note: G = Games pitched; W = Wins; L = Losses; SV = Saves; ERA = Earned run average; SO = Strikeouts

Player	G	W	L	SV	ERA	SO
Bob Chakales	43	4	4	4	4.03	33
Connie Grob	37	4	5	1	7.83	27
Bud Byerly	25	2	4	4	2.96	19
Tex Clevenger	20	0	0	0	5.40	17

== Farm system ==
Level	Team	League	Manager
AAA	Louisville Colonels	American Association	Red Marion and Max Carey
AA	Chattanooga Lookouts	Southern Association	Cal Ermer
A	Charlotte Hornets	Sally League	Rollie Hemsley
B	Hobbs Sports	Southwestern League	Pat Stasey
C	Thibodaux Senators	Evangeline League	Bill Dossey
D	Fort Walton Beach Jets	Alabama–Florida League	Bill Brightwell
D	Superior Senators	Nebraska State League	Ray Baker
D	Erie Senators	PONY League	Johnny Welaj

LEAGUE CO-CHAMPIONS: Thibodaux
