= 1956 Boston Red Sox season =

Major League Baseball season

1956 Boston Red Sox
- League: American League
- Ballpark: Fenway Park
- City: Boston, Massachusetts
- Record: 84–70 (.545)
- League place: 4th
- Owners: Tom Yawkey
- President: Tom Yawkey
- General managers: Joe Cronin
- Managers: Pinky Higgins
- Television: WBZ-TV, Ch. 4 and WNAC-TV, Ch. 7
- Radio: WHDH-AM 850 (Curt Gowdy, Bob Murphy)
- Stats: ESPN.com; Baseball Reference

The 1956 Boston Red Sox season was the 56th season in the franchise's Major League Baseball history. The Red Sox finished fourth in the American League (AL) with a record of 84 wins and 70 losses, 13 games behind the New York Yankees, who went on to win the 1956 World Series.

== Offseason ==
- November 8, 1955: Karl Olson, Dick Brodowski, Tex Clevenger, Neil Chrisley, and Al Curtis (minors) were traded by the Red Sox to the Washington Senators for Mickey Vernon, Bob Porterfield, Johnny Schmitz, and Tom Umphlett.
- November 27, 1955: Ed Mayer was drafted from the Red Sox by the St. Louis Cardinals in the 1955 minor league draft.

== Regular season ==
=== Season standings ===
American League
Team	W	L	Pct.	GB	Home	Road
New York Yankees	97	57	.630	—	49‍–‍28	48‍–‍29
Cleveland Indians	88	66	.571	9	46‍–‍31	42‍–‍35
Chicago White Sox	85	69	.552	12	46‍–‍31	39‍–‍38
Boston Red Sox	84	70	.545	13	43‍–‍34	41‍–‍36
Detroit Tigers	82	72	.532	15	37‍–‍40	45‍–‍32
Baltimore Orioles	69	85	.448	28	41‍–‍36	28‍–‍49
Washington Senators	59	95	.383	38	32‍–‍45	27‍–‍50
Kansas City Athletics	52	102	.338	45	22‍–‍55	30‍–‍47

=== Record vs. opponents ===
1956 American League record Sources:
Team	BAL	BOS	CWS	CLE	DET	KCA	NYY	WSH
Baltimore	—	6–16	9–13	5–17	13–9	15–7	9–13	12–10
Boston	16–6	—	14–8	13–9–1	12–10	12–10	8–14	9–13
Chicago	13–9	8–14	—	15–7	13–9	14–8	9–13	13–9
Cleveland	17–5	9–13–1	7–15	—	11–11	17–5	10–12	17–5
Detroit	9–13	10–12	9–13	11–11	—	16–6	12–10	15–7–1
Kansas City	7–15	10–12	8–14	5–17	6–16	—	4–18	12–10
New York	13–9	14–8	13–9	12–10	10–12	18–4	—	17–5
Washington	10–12	13–9	9–13	5–17	7–15–1	10–12	5–17	—

=== Opening Day lineup ===
10	Billy Goodman	2B
11	Frank Malzone	3B
9	Ted Williams	LF
4	Jackie Jensen	RF
6	Mickey Vernon	1B
37	Jimmy Piersall	CF
24	Don Buddin	SS
22	Sammy White	C
18	Frank Sullivan	P

=== Roster ===
1956 Boston Red Sox
Roster
Pitchers: 40 Frank Baumann; 23 Tom Brewer; 14 Ike Delock; 16 Harry Dorish; 28 Tom Hurd; 19 Leo Kiely; 29 Rudy Minarcin; 15 Willard Nixon; 17 Mel Parnell; 20 Bob Porterfield; 21 Johnny Schmitz; 39 Dave Sisler; 18 Frank Sullivan; 27 George Susce	Catchers: 8 Pete Daley; 22 Sammy White; Infielders: 2 Milt Bolling; 24 Don Buddin; 7 Billy Consolo; 10 Billy Goodman; 35 Billy Klaus; 12 Ted Lepcio; 11 Frank Malzone; 24 Gene Mauch; 6 Mickey Vernon; 3 Norm Zauchin	Outfielders: 25 Dick Gernert; 4 Jackie Jensen; 37 Jimmy Piersall; 38 Gene Stephens; 26 Faye Throneberry; 9 Ted Williams; Other batters: 1 Grady Hatton; 20 Marty Keough	Manager: 5 Pinky Higgins; Coaches: 32 Del Baker (First base); 31 Jack Burns (Third base); 33 Dave Ferriss (Pitching); 30 Mickey Owen (Bullpen); 34 Paul Schreiber (Hitting)

== Player stats ==
=== Batting ===
==== Starters by position ====
Note: Pos = Position; G = Games played; AB = At bats; H = Hits; Avg. = Batting average; HR = Home runs; RBI = Runs batted in

Pos	Player	G	AB	H	Avg.	HR	RBI
C	Sammy White	114	392	96	.245	5	44
1B	Mickey Vernon	119	403	125	.310	15	84
2B	Billy Goodman	105	399	117	.293	2	38
SS	Don Buddin	114	377	90	.239	5	37
3B	Billy Klaus	135	520	141	.271	7	59
LF	Ted Williams	136	400	138	.345	24	82
CF	Jim Piersall	155	601	176	.293	14	87
RF	Jackie Jensen	151	578	182	.315	20	97

==== Other batters ====
Note: G = Games played; AB = At bats; H = Hits; Avg. = Batting average; HR = Home runs; RBI = Runs batted in

Player	G	AB	H	Avg.	HR	RBI
Dick Gernert	106	306	89	.291	16	68
Ted Lepcio	83	284	74	.261	15	51
Pete Daley	59	187	50	.267	5	29
Milt Bolling	45	118	25	.212	3	8
Frank Malzone	27	103	17	.165	2	11
Norm Zauchin	44	84	18	.214	2	11
Gene Stephens	104	63	17	.270	1	7
Faye Throneberry	24	50	11	.220	1	3
Gene Mauch	7	25	8	.320	0	1
Billy Consolo	48	11	2	.182	0	1
Grady Hatton	5	5	2	.400	0	2
Marty Keough	3	2	0	.000	0	1

=== Pitching ===
==== Starting pitchers ====
Note: G = Games pitched; IP = Innings pitched; W = Wins; L = Losses; ERA = Earned run average; SO = Strikeouts

Player	G	IP	W	L	ERA	SO
Tom Brewer	32	244.1	19	9	3.50	127
Frank Sullivan	34	242.0	14	7	3.42	116
Willard Nixon	23	145.1	9	8	4.21	74
Mel Parnell	21	131.1	7	6	3.77	41
Bob Porterfield	25	126.0	3	12	5.14	53

==== Other pitchers ====
Note: G = Games pitched; IP = Innings pitched; W = Wins; L = Losses; ERA = Earned run average; SO = Strikeouts

Player	G	IP	W	L	ERA	SO
Dave Sisler	39	142.1	9	8	4.62	93
Ike Delock	48	128.1	13	7	4.21	105
George Susce	21	69.2	2	4	6.20	26
Frank Baumann	7	24.2	2	1	3.28	18
Rudy Minarcin	3	9.2	1	0	2.79	5

==== Relief pitchers ====
Note: G = Games pitched; W = Wins; L = Losses; SV = Saves; ERA = Earned run average; SO = Strikeouts

Player	G	W	L	SV	ERA	SO
Tom Hurd	40	3	4	5	5.33	34
Leo Kiely	23	2	2	3	5.17	9
Fritz Dorish	15	0	2	0	3.57	11
Johnny Schmitz	2	0	0	0	0.00	0

== Farm system ==
Level	Team	League	Manager
Open	San Francisco Seals	Pacific Coast League	Eddie Joost and Joe Gordon
AA	Oklahoma City Indians	Texas League	Rudy Laskowski, Ray Cash and Jodie Beeler
A	Albany Senators	Eastern League	Sheriff Robinson
B	Greensboro Patriots	Carolina League	Eddie Popowski
C	San Jose JoSox	California League	Dick Whitman
D	Lafayette Red Sox	Midwest League	Len Okrie
D	Lexington Red Sox	Nebraska State League	Danny Doyle
D	Corning Red Sox	PONY League	Elmer Yoter
