= 1958 Washington Senators season =

1958 Washington Senators
- League: American League
- Ballpark: Griffith Stadium
- City: Washington, D.C.
- Record: 61–93 (.396)
- League place: 8th
- Owners: Calvin Griffith (majority owner, with Thelma Griffith Haynes)
- General managers: Calvin Griffith
- Managers: Cookie Lavagetto
- Television: WTTG
- Radio: WWDC (FM) (Chuck Thompson, Bob Wolff, Bailey Goss)

The 1958 Washington Senators won 61 games, lost 93, and finished in eighth place in the American League, 31 games behind the New York Yankees. They were managed by Cookie Lavagetto and played home games at Griffith Stadium.

== Offseason ==
- January 23, 1958: Pete Runnels was traded by the Senators to the Boston Red Sox for Norm Zauchin and Albie Pearson.
- February 25, 1958: Milt Bolling was traded by the Senators to the Cleveland Indians for Pete Mesa (minors).

== Regular season ==
Pedro Ramos led the American League in losses.

=== Season standings ===
American League
Team	W	L	Pct.	GB	Home	Road
New York Yankees	92	62	.597	—	44‍–‍33	48‍–‍29
Chicago White Sox	82	72	.532	10	47‍–‍30	35‍–‍42
Boston Red Sox	79	75	.513	13	49‍–‍28	30‍–‍47
Cleveland Indians	77	76	.503	14½	42‍–‍34	35‍–‍42
Detroit Tigers	77	77	.500	15	43‍–‍34	34‍–‍43
Baltimore Orioles	74	79	.484	17½	46‍–‍31	28‍–‍48
Kansas City Athletics	73	81	.474	19	43‍–‍34	30‍–‍47
Washington Senators	61	93	.396	31	33‍–‍44	28‍–‍49

=== Record vs. opponents ===
1958 American League record Sources:
Team	BAL	BOS	CWS	CLE	DET	KCA	NYY	WSH
Baltimore	—	10–12	9–13–1	10–11	10–12	12–10	8–14	15–7
Boston	12–10	—	10–12	12–10	10–12	12–10	9–13–1	14–8
Chicago	13–9–1	12–10	—	12–10	10–12	12–10	7–15	16–6
Cleveland	11–10	10–12	10–12	—	14–8	10–12	7–15	15–7
Detroit	12–10	12–10	12–10	8–14	—	12–10	12–10	9–13
Kansas City	10–12	10–12	10–12	12–10	10–12	—	9–13	12–10–2
New York	14–8	13–9–1	15–7	15–7	10–12	13–9	—	12–10
Washington	7–15	8–14	6–16	7–15	13–9	10–12–2	10–12	—

=== Notable transactions ===
- May 14, 1958: Whitey Herzog was purchased from the Senators by the Kansas City Athletics.
- May 14, 1958: Al Cicotte was purchased by the Senators from the New York Yankees.
- June 23, 1958: Al Cicotte was traded by the Senators to the Detroit Tigers for Vito Valentinetti.

=== Roster ===
1958 Washington Senators
Roster
Pitchers: 27 Joe Albanese; 11 Bud Byerly; 21 Al Cicotte; 12 Tex Clevenger; 34 Jim Constable; 26 Bill Fischer; 24 Hal Griggs; 35 Dick Hyde; 16 Russ Kemmerer; 27 Ralph Lumenti; 17 Camilo Pascual; 28 Pedro Ramos; 21 John Romonosky; 21 Jack Spring; 18 Chuck Stobbs; 11 Vito Valentinetti; 21 Bob Wiesler	Catchers: 9 Lou Berberet; 14 Clint Courtney; 8 Ed Fitz Gerald; 10 Steve Korcheck; Infielders: 22 Ossie Álvarez; 4 Ken Aspromonte; 29 Julio Bécquer; 31 Rocky Bridges; 3 Harmon Killebrew; 7 Bobby Malkmus; 25 Herb Plews; 29 Johnny Schaive; 34 Jerry Snyder; 1 Eddie Yost; 5 Norm Zauchin	Outfielders: 15 Bob Allison; 32 Neil Chrisley; 30 Whitey Herzog; 23 Jim Lemon; 6 Albie Pearson; 2 Roy Sievers; 30 Faye Throneberry	Manager: 51 Cookie Lavagetto; Coaches: 55 Boom-Boom Beck; 53 Ellis Clary; 54 Billy Jurges

== Player stats ==
=== Batting ===
==== Starters by position ====
Note: Pos = Position; G = Games played; AB = At bats; H = Hits; Avg. = Batting average; HR = Home runs; RBI = Runs batted in

Pos	Player	G	AB	H	Avg.	HR	RBI
C	Clint Courtney	134	450	113	.251	8	62
1B	Norm Zauchin	96	303	69	.228	15	37
2B	Ken Aspromonte	92	253	57	.225	5	27
SS	Rocky Bridges	116	377	99	.263	5	28
3B	Eddie Yost	134	406	91	.224	8	37
LF	Roy Sievers	148	550	162	.295	39	108
CF	Albie Pearson	146	530	146	.275	3	33
RF	Jim Lemon	142	501	123	.246	26	75

==== Other batters ====
Note: G = Games played; AB = At bats; H = Hits; Avg. = Batting average; HR = Home runs; RBI = Runs batted in

Player	G	AB	H	Avg.	HR	RBI
Herb Plews	111	380	98	.258	2	29
Neil Chrisley	105	233	50	.215	5	26
Ossie Álvarez	87	196	41	.209	0	5
Julio Bécquer	86	164	39	.238	0	12
Ed Fitz Gerald	58	114	30	.263	0	11
Faye Throneberry	44	87	16	.184	4	7
Bobby Malkmus	41	70	13	.186	0	3
Steve Korcheck	21	51	4	.078	0	1
Bob Allison	11	35	7	.200	0	0
Harmon Killebrew	13	31	6	.194	0	2
Johnny Schaive	7	24	6	.250	0	1
Jerry Snyder	6	9	1	.111	0	1
Lou Berberet	5	6	1	.167	0	0
Whitey Herzog	8	5	0	.000	0	0

=== Pitching ===
==== Starting pitchers ====
Note: G = Games pitched; IP = Innings pitched; W = Wins; L = Losses; ERA = Earned run average; SO = Strikeouts

Player	G	IP	W	L	ERA	SO
Pedro Ramos	43	259.1	14	18	4.23	132
Russ Kemmerer	40	224.1	6	15	4.61	111
Camilo Pascual	31	177.1	8	12	3.15	146
Bill Fischer	3	21.0	0	3	3.86	10

==== Other pitchers ====
Note: G = Games pitched; IP = Innings pitched; W = Wins; L = Losses; ERA = Earned run average; SO = Strikeouts

Player	G	IP	W	L	ERA	SO
Hal Griggs	32	137.0	3	11	5.52	69
Vito Valentinetti	23	95.2	4	6	5.08	33
Chuck Stobbs	19	56.2	2	6	6.04	23
John Romonosky	18	55.1	2	4	6.51	38
Al Cicotte	8	28.0	0	3	4.82	14
Jim Constable	15	27.2	0	1	4.88	25
Ralph Lumenti	8	21.0	1	2	8.57	20
Jack Spring	3	7.0	0	0	14.14	1

==== Relief pitchers ====
Note: G = Games pitched; W = Wins; L = Losses; SV = Saves; ERA = Earned run average; SO = Strikeouts

Player	G	W	L	SV	ERA	SO
Dick Hyde	53	10	3	19	1.75	49
Tex Clevenger	55	9	9	6	4.35	70
Bud Byerly	17	2	0	1	6.75	13
Joe Albanese	6	0	0	0	4.50	3
Bob Wiesler	4	0	0	0	6.75	5

== Farm system ==
Level	Team	League	Manager
AA	Chattanooga Lookouts	Southern Association	Red Marion
A	Charlotte Hornets	Sally League	Gene Verble
B	Fox Cities Foxes	Illinois–Indiana–Iowa League	Pete Suder
C	Missoula Timberjacks	Pioneer League	Jack McKeon
D	Fort Walton Beach Jets	Alabama–Florida League	Nesbit Wilson and Vince Magi
D	Gainesville G-Men	Florida State League	Buddy Leftridge and Red Dulaney
D	Superior Senators	Nebraska State League	Hal Keller
D	Elmira Pioneers	New York–Penn League	Mel Kerestes and Packy Rogers
