= 1958 Boston Red Sox season =

Major League Baseball season

1958 Boston Red Sox
- League: American League
- Ballpark: Fenway Park
- City: Boston, Massachusetts
- Record: 79–75 (.513)
- League place: 3rd
- Owners: Tom Yawkey
- President: Tom Yawkey
- General managers: Joe Cronin
- Managers: Pinky Higgins
- Television: WHDH-TV
- Radio: WHDH-AM 850 (Curt Gowdy, Bob Murphy, Bill Crowley)
- Stats: ESPN.com; Baseball Reference

The 1958 Boston Red Sox season was the 58th season in the franchise's Major League Baseball history. The Red Sox finished third in the American League (AL) with a record of 79 wins and 75 losses, 13 games behind the AL and World Series champion New York Yankees. It would be the last time the Red Sox finished a season above .500, until their "Impossible Dream" season of 1967.

== Offseason ==
- January 23, 1958: Norm Zauchin and Albie Pearson were traded by the Red Sox to the Washington Senators for Pete Runnels.
- January 29, 1958: Mickey Vernon was selected off waivers from the Red Sox by the Cleveland Indians.
- Prior to 1958 season: Galen Cisco was signed as an amateur free agent by the Red Sox.

== Regular season ==
=== Season standings ===
American League
Team	W	L	Pct.	GB	Home	Road
New York Yankees	92	62	.597	—	44‍–‍33	48‍–‍29
Chicago White Sox	82	72	.532	10	47‍–‍30	35‍–‍42
Boston Red Sox	79	75	.513	13	49‍–‍28	30‍–‍47
Cleveland Indians	77	76	.503	14½	42‍–‍34	35‍–‍42
Detroit Tigers	77	77	.500	15	43‍–‍34	34‍–‍43
Baltimore Orioles	74	79	.484	17½	46‍–‍31	28‍–‍48
Kansas City Athletics	73	81	.474	19	43‍–‍34	30‍–‍47
Washington Senators	61	93	.396	31	33‍–‍44	28‍–‍49

=== Record vs. opponents ===
1958 American League record Sources:
Team	BAL	BOS	CWS	CLE	DET	KCA	NYY	WSH
Baltimore	—	10–12	9–13–1	10–11	10–12	12–10	8–14	15–7
Boston	12–10	—	10–12	12–10	10–12	12–10	9–13–1	14–8
Chicago	13–9–1	12–10	—	12–10	10–12	12–10	7–15	16–6
Cleveland	11–10	10–12	10–12	—	14–8	10–12	7–15	15–7
Detroit	12–10	12–10	12–10	8–14	—	12–10	12–10	9–13
Kansas City	10–12	10–12	10–12	12–10	10–12	—	9–13	12–10–2
New York	14–8	13–9–1	15–7	15–7	10–12	13–9	—	12–10
Washington	7–15	8–14	6–16	7–15	13–9	10–12–2	10–12	—

=== Opening day lineup ===
24	Don Buddin	SS
3	Pete Runnels	1B
10	Gene Stephens	LF
4	Jackie Jensen	RF
11	Frank Malzone	3B
37	Jimmy Piersall	CF
7	Ken Aspromonte	2B
8	Pete Daley	C
18	Frank Sullivan	P

=== Roster ===
1958 Boston Red Sox
Roster
Pitchers: 15 Frank Baumann; 28 Ted Bowsfield; 23 Tom Brewer; 15 Bud Byerly; 19 Jerry Casale; 14 Ike Delock; 20 Mike Fornieles; 17 Leo Kiely; 27 Bill Monbouquette; 21 Willard Nixon; 19 Bob Porterfield; 29 Al Schroll; 39 Dave Sisler; 28 Bob Smith; 18 Frank Sullivan; 27 George Susce; 26 Murray Wall; 15 Duane Wilson	Catchers: 36 Lou Berberet; 8 Pete Daley; 22 Sammy White; Infielders: 7 Ken Aspromonte; 24 Don Buddin; 1 Billy Consolo; 25 Dick Gernert; 35 Billy Klaus; 12 Ted Lepcio; 11 Frank Malzone; 3 Pete Runnels	Outfielders: 4 Jackie Jensen; 2 Marty Keough; 37 Jimmy Piersall; 30 Bill Renna; 38 Gene Stephens; 9 Ted Williams	Manager: 5 Pinky Higgins; Coaches: 32 Del Baker (First base); 31 Jack Burns (Third base); 33 Dave Ferriss (Pitching); 34 Paul Schreiber (Hitting)

== Player stats ==
= Indicates team leader

= Indicates league leader

=== Batting ===
==== Starters by position ====
Note: Pos = Position; G = Games played; AB = At bats; H = Hits; Avg. = Batting average; HR = Home runs; RBI = Runs batted in

Pos	Player	G	AB	H	Avg.	HR	RBI
C	Sammy White	102	328	85	.259	6	35
1B	Dick Gernert	122	431	102	.237	20	69
2B	Pete Runnels	147	568	183	.322	8	59
SS	Don Buddin	136	497	118	.237	12	43
3B	Frank Malzone	155	627	185	.295	15	87
LF	Ted Williams	129	411	135	.328	26	85
CF	Jim Piersall	130	417	99	.237	8	48
RF	Jackie Jensen	154	548	157	.286	35	122

==== Other batters ====
Note: G = Games played; AB = At bats; H = Hits; Avg. = Batting average; HR = Home runs; RBI = Runs batted in

Player	G	AB	H	Avg.	HR	RBI
Gene Stephens	134	270	59	.219	9	25
Lou Berberet	57	167	35	.210	2	18
Ted Lepcio	50	136	27	.199	6	14
Marty Keough	68	118	26	.220	1	9
Billy Klaus	61	88	14	.159	1	7
Billy Consolo	46	72	9	.125	0	5
Pete Daley	27	56	18	.321	2	8
Bill Renna	39	56	15	.268	4	18
Ken Aspromonte	6	16	2	.125	0	0

=== Pitching ===
==== Starting pitchers ====
Note: G = Games pitched; IP = Innings pitched; W = Wins; L = Losses; ERA = Earned run average; SO = Strikeouts

Player	G	IP	W	L	ERA	SO
Tom Brewer	33	227.1	12	12	3.72	124
Frank Sullivan	32	199.1	13	9	3.57	103
Ike Delock	31	160.0	14	8	3.38	82
Dave Sisler	30	149.1	8	9	4.94	71
Duane Wilson	2	6.1	0	0	5.68	3

==== Other pitchers ====
Note: G = Games pitched; IP = Innings pitched; W = Wins; L = Losses; ERA = Earned run average; SO = Strikeouts

Player	G	IP	W	L	ERA	SO
Mike Fornieles	37	110.2	4	6	4.96	49
Bob Smith	17	66.2	4	3	3.78	43
Ted Bowsfield	16	65.2	4	2	3.84	38
Bill Monbouquette	10	54.1	3	4	3.31	30
Frank Baumann	10	52.1	2	2	4.47	31
Willard Nixon	10	43.1	1	7	6.02	15

==== Relief pitchers ====
Note: G = Games pitched; W = Wins; L = Losses; SV = Saves; ERA = Earned run average; SO = Strikeouts

Player	G	W	L	SV	ERA	SO
Leo Kiely	47	5	2	12	3.00	26
Murray Wall	52	8	9	9	3.62	53
Bud Byerly	18	1	2	0	1.78	16
Al Schroll	5	0	0	0	4.50	7
Bob Porterfield	2	0	0	0	4.50	1
Jerry Casale	2	0	0	0	0.00	3
George Susce	2	0	0	0	18.00	0

== Awards and honors ==
- Jackie Jensen, American League MVP
- Jimmy Piersall, Gold Glove Award (OF)

== Farm system ==
Level	Team	League	Manager
AAA	Minneapolis Millers	American Association	Gene Mauch
AA	Memphis Chicks	Southern Association	Sheriff Robinson
A	Allentown Red Sox	Eastern League	Eddie Popowski
B	Raleigh Capitals	Carolina League	Len Okrie
D	Waterloo Hawks	Midwest League	Ken Deal
D	Lexington Red Sox	Nebraska State League	Jack Kaiser
D	Corning Red Sox	New York–Penn League	Elmer Yoter

LEAGUE CHAMPIONS: Minneapolis, Waterloo
