= 1956 Baltimore Orioles season =

Major League Baseball season

1956 Baltimore Orioles
- League: American League
- Ballpark: Memorial Stadium
- City: Baltimore, Maryland
- Record: 69–85 (.448)
- League place: 6th
- Owners: Jerold Hoffberger, Joseph Iglehart
- General managers: Paul Richards
- Managers: Paul Richards
- Television: WMAR-TV/WAAM/WBAL-TV
- Radio: WCBM (Ernie Harwell, Chuck Thompson, Bailey Goss)

The 1956 Baltimore Orioles season involved the Orioles finishing 6th in the American League with a record of 69 wins and 85 losses.

== Offseason ==
- October 10, 1955: Ed Lopat was released by the Orioles.

== Regular season ==
- September 20, 1956: Catcher Tom Gastall was killed in a plane crash.
- September 30, 1956: Joe Frazier hit a home run in the last at bat of his career.

=== Season standings ===
American League
Team	W	L	Pct.	GB	Home	Road
New York Yankees	97	57	.630	—	49‍–‍28	48‍–‍29
Cleveland Indians	88	66	.571	9	46‍–‍31	42‍–‍35
Chicago White Sox	85	69	.552	12	46‍–‍31	39‍–‍38
Boston Red Sox	84	70	.545	13	43‍–‍34	41‍–‍36
Detroit Tigers	82	72	.532	15	37‍–‍40	45‍–‍32
Baltimore Orioles	69	85	.448	28	41‍–‍36	28‍–‍49
Washington Senators	59	95	.383	38	32‍–‍45	27‍–‍50
Kansas City Athletics	52	102	.338	45	22‍–‍55	30‍–‍47

=== Record vs. opponents ===
1956 American League record Sources:
Team	BAL	BOS	CWS	CLE	DET	KCA	NYY	WSH
Baltimore	—	6–16	9–13	5–17	13–9	15–7	9–13	12–10
Boston	16–6	—	14–8	13–9–1	12–10	12–10	8–14	9–13
Chicago	13–9	8–14	—	15–7	13–9	14–8	9–13	13–9
Cleveland	17–5	9–13–1	7–15	—	11–11	17–5	10–12	17–5
Detroit	9–13	10–12	9–13	11–11	—	16–6	12–10	15–7–1
Kansas City	7–15	10–12	8–14	5–17	6–16	—	4–18	12–10
New York	13–9	14–8	13–9	12–10	10–12	18–4	—	17–5
Washington	10–12	13–9	9–13	5–17	7–15–1	10–12	5–17	—

=== Notable transactions ===
- May 14, 1956: Billy Loes was purchased by the Orioles from the Brooklyn Dodgers for $20,000.
- May 21, 1956: Dave Philley and Jim Wilson were traded by the Orioles to the Chicago White Sox for Mike Fornieles, Connie Johnson, George Kell and Bob Nieman.
- July 13, 1956: Morrie Martin was selected off waivers by the Orioles from the Chicago White Sox.
- August 17, 1956: Hal Smith was traded by the Orioles to the Kansas City Athletics for Joe Ginsberg.

=== Roster ===
1956 Baltimore Orioles
Roster
Pitchers: 28 Charlie Beamon; 38 Fred Besana; 25,41 Babe Birrer; 28 Hal Brown; 20 Sandy Consuegra; 23 Harry Dorish; 39 Don Ferrarese; 25,36,41 Mike Fornieles; 21 Bob Harrison; 40 Mel Held; 36 Connie Johnson; 38 Billy Loes; 19 Morrie Martin; 32 Ron Moeller; 29 Ray Moore; 18 Billy O'Dell; 16 Erv Palica; 40 Johnny Schmitz; 24 Gordie Sundin; 15 George Werley; 17 Bill Wight; 36 Jim Wilson; 35 George Zuverink	Catchers: 10 Tom Gastall; 22 Joe Ginsberg; 22 Hal Smith; 11 Gus Triandos; Infielders: 5 Bobby Adams; 1 Bob Boyd; 33 Wayne Causey; 9 Billy Gardner; 6 Bob Hale; 5 Grady Hatton; 3 George Kell; 2 Fred Marsh; 7 Willy Miranda; 6 Brooks Robinson	Outfielders: 32 Chuck Diering; 14 Jim Dyck; 14,17 Hoot Evers; 44 Tito Francona; 2 Joe Frazier; 37 Tex Nelson; 4 Bob Nieman; 4 Dave Philley; 3 Dave Pope; 8 Jim Pyburn; 23 Dick Williams	Manager: 12 Paul Richards; Coaches: 31 Harry Brecheen; 26 Lum Harris; 30 Al Vincent

== Player stats ==
=== Batting ===
==== Starters by position ====
Note: Pos = Position; G = Games played; AB = At bats; H = Hits; Avg. = Batting average; HR = Home runs; RBI = Runs batted in

Pos	Player	G	AB	H	Avg.	HR	RBI
C	Gus Triandos	131	452	126	.279	21	88
1B	Bob Boyd	70	225	70	.311	2	11
2B	Billy Gardner	144	515	119	.231	11	50
SS	Willy Miranda	148	461	100	.217	2	34
3B	George Kell	102	345	90	.261	8	37
LF	Bob Nieman	114	388	125	.322	12	64
CF	Dick Williams	87	353	101	.286	11	37
RF	Tito Francona	139	445	115	.258	9	57

==== Other batters ====
Note: G = Games played; AB = At bats; H = Hits; Avg. = Batting average; HR = Home runs; RBI = Runs batted in

Player	G	AB	H	Avg.	HR	RBI
Hal Smith	77	229	60	.262	3	18
Bob Hale	85	207	49	.237	1	24
Jim Pyburn	84	156	27	.173	2	11
Dave Philley	32	117	24	.205	1	17
Hoot Evers	48	112	27	.241	1	4
Bobby Adams	41	111	25	.225	0	7
Chuck Diering	50	97	18	.186	1	4
Wayne Causey	53	88	15	.170	1	4
Joe Frazier	45	74	19	.257	1	12
Tex Nelson	39	68	14	.206	0	5
Grady Hatton	27	61	9	.148	1	3
Tom Gastall	32	56	11	.196	0	4
Brooks Robinson	15	44	10	.227	1	1
Joe Ginsberg	15	28	2	.071	0	2
Fred Marsh	20	24	3	.125	0	0
Jim Dyck	11	23	5	.217	0	0
Dave Pope	12	19	3	.158	0	1

=== Pitching ===
==== Starting pitchers ====
Note: G = Games pitched; IP = Innings pitched; W = Wins; L = Losses; ERA = Earned run average; SO = Strikeouts

Player	G	IP	W	L	ERA	SO
Ray Moore	32	185.0	12	7	4.18	105
Connie Johnson	26	183.2	9	10	3.43	130
Bill Wight	35	174.2	9	12	4.02	84
Jim Wilson	7	48.1	4	2	5.03	31
Bob Harrison	1	1.2	0	0	16.20	0

==== Other pitchers ====
Note: G = Games pitched; IP = Innings pitched; W = Wins; L = Losses; ERA = Earned run average; SO = Strikeouts

Player	G	IP	W	L	ERA	SO
Hal Brown	35	151.2	9	7	4.04	57
Erv Palica	29	116.1	4	11	4.49	62
Mike Fornieles	30	111.0	4	7	3.97	53
Don Ferrarese	36	102.0	4	10	5.03	81
Billy Loes	21	56.2	2	7	4.76	22
Fred Besana	7	17.2	1	0	5.60	7
Charlie Beamon	2	13.0	2	0	1.38	14
Ron Moeller	4	8.2	0	1	4.15	2
Sandy Consuegra	4	8.2	1	1	4.15	1
Billy O'Dell	4	8.0	0	0	1.13	6

==== Relief pitchers ====
Note: G = Games pitched; W = Wins; L = Losses; SV = Saves; ERA = Earned run average; SO = Strikeouts

Player	G	W	L	SV	ERA	SO
George Zuverink	62	7	6	16	4.16	33
Johnny Schmitz	18	0	3	0	3.99	15
Fritz Dorish	13	0	0	0	4.12	4
Morrie Martin	9	1	1	0	10.80	3
Mel Held	4	0	0	0	5.14	4
Babe Birrer	4	0	0	0	6.75	1
George Werley	1	0	0	0	9.00	0
Gordie Sundin	1	0	0	0	inf	0

== Farm system ==
Level	Team	League	Manager
Open	Vancouver Mounties	Pacific Coast League	Lefty O'Doul
AA	San Antonio Missions	Texas League	Joe Schultz
A	Columbus Foxes	Sally League	Skeeter Newsome
B	Lubbock Hubbers/Texas City Texans	Big State League	Bill Krueger and Jay Haney
C	Phoenix Stars	Arizona–Mexico League	Billy Capps
C	Aberdeen Pheasants	Northern League	George Staller
D	Thomson Orioles	Georgia State League	Barney Lutz and Enid Drake
D	Paris Orioles	Sooner State League	Jimmy Adair and Barney Lutz

Lubbock franchise transferred to Texas City and renamed, July 8, 1956
