= 1958 Baltimore Orioles season =

Major League Baseball season

1958 Baltimore Orioles
- League: American League
- Ballpark: Memorial Stadium
- City: Baltimore, Maryland
- Record: 74–79 (.484)
- League place: 6th
- Owners: Jerold Hoffberger, Joseph Iglehart
- General managers: Paul Richards
- Managers: Paul Richards
- Television: WJZ-TV
- Radio: WBAL (AM) (Ernie Harwell, Herb Carneal)

The 1958 Baltimore Orioles season involved the Orioles finishing 6th in the American League with a record of 74 wins and 79 losses, 17.5 games behind the AL and World Series champion New York Yankees. The team was managed by Paul Richards, and played their home games at Baltimore's Memorial Stadium, which hosted the All-Star Game that season. During the 1958 season, Gus Triandos hit 30 home runs, setting a Baltimore Orioles franchise record (since broken) for most home runs in one season.

== Offseason ==
- March 24, 1958: Foster Castleman was purchased by the Orioles from the San Francisco Giants for $30,000.

== Regular season ==
On June 6, 1958, Orioles president James Keelty Jr. reached agreement with Miami Marlins president George B. Storer to move the Orioles' spring training home from Scottsdale, Arizona to Miami Stadium for the 1959 spring training season.

On September 20, pitcher Hoyt Wilhelm struck out eight batters while throwing a no-hitter against the New York Yankees. It was the first no-hitter in Baltimore Orioles history, as Gus Triandos contributed a home run in the 1–0 win.

=== Season standings ===
American League
Team	W	L	Pct.	GB	Home	Road
New York Yankees	92	62	.597	—	44‍–‍33	48‍–‍29
Chicago White Sox	82	72	.532	10	47‍–‍30	35‍–‍42
Boston Red Sox	79	75	.513	13	49‍–‍28	30‍–‍47
Cleveland Indians	77	76	.503	14½	42‍–‍34	35‍–‍42
Detroit Tigers	77	77	.500	15	43‍–‍34	34‍–‍43
Baltimore Orioles	74	79	.484	17½	46‍–‍31	28‍–‍48
Kansas City Athletics	73	81	.474	19	43‍–‍34	30‍–‍47
Washington Senators	61	93	.396	31	33‍–‍44	28‍–‍49

=== Record vs. opponents ===
1958 American League record Sources:
Team	BAL	BOS	CWS	CLE	DET	KCA	NYY	WSH
Baltimore	—	10–12	9–13–1	10–11	10–12	12–10	8–14	15–7
Boston	12–10	—	10–12	12–10	10–12	12–10	9–13–1	14–8
Chicago	13–9–1	12–10	—	12–10	10–12	12–10	7–15	16–6
Cleveland	11–10	10–12	10–12	—	14–8	10–12	7–15	15–7
Detroit	12–10	12–10	12–10	8–14	—	12–10	12–10	9–13
Kansas City	10–12	10–12	10–12	12–10	10–12	—	9–13	12–10–2
New York	14–8	13–9–1	15–7	15–7	10–12	13–9	—	12–10
Washington	7–15	8–14	6–16	7–15	13–9	10–12–2	10–12	—

=== Notable transactions ===
- May 16, 1958: Eddie Miksis was released by the Orioles.
- August 23, 1958: Hoyt Wilhelm was selected off waivers by the Orioles from the Cleveland Indians.

=== Roster ===
1958 Baltimore Orioles
Roster
Pitchers: 43 Charlie Beamon; 28 Hal Brown; 29 Jack Harshman; 36 Connie Johnson; 39 Ken Lehman; 18 Billy Loes; 40 Ron Moeller; 41 Billy O'Dell; 32 Milt Pappas; 24 Arnie Portocarrero; 19 Lou Sleater; 38 Jerry Walker; 15 Hoyt Wilhelm; 35 George Zuverink	Catchers: 22 Joe Ginsberg; 11 Gus Triandos; 42 Frank Zupo; Infielders: 25 Jerry Adair; 1 Bob Boyd; 8 Foster Castleman; 9 Billy Gardner; 20 Bob Hale; 3 Ron Hansen; 44 Jim Marshall; 6 Eddie Miksis; 7 Willy Miranda; 5 Brooks Robinson	Outfielders: 17 Leo Burke; 33 Jim Busby; 21 Lenny Green; 4 Bob Nieman; 40 Chuck Oertel; 2 Al Pilarcik; 44 Willie Tasby; 27 Joe Taylor; 23 Dick Williams; 14 Gene Woodling; Other batters: 20 Bert Hamric	Manager: 12 Paul Richards; Coaches: 45 Jimmy Adair; 31 Harry Brecheen; 26 Lum Harris; 37 Eddie Robinson; 30 Al Vincent

== Player stats ==
=== Batting ===
==== Starters by position ====
Note: Pos = Position; G = Games played; AB = At bats; H = Hits; Avg. = Batting average; HR = Home runs; RBI = Runs batted in

Pos	Player	G	AB	H	Avg.	HR	RBI
C	Gus Triandos	137	474	116	.245	30	79
1B	Bob Boyd	125	401	124	.309	7	36
2B	Billy Gardner	151	560	126	.225	3	33
SS	Willy Miranda	102	214	43	.201	1	8
3B	Brooks Robinson	145	463	110	.238	3	32
LF	Bob Nieman	105	366	119	.325	16	60
CF	Jim Busby	113	215	51	.237	3	19
RF	Al Pilarcik	141	379	92	.243	1	24

==== Other batters ====
Note: G = Games played; AB = At bats; H = Hits; Avg. = Batting average; HR = Home runs; RBI = Runs batted in

Player	G	AB	H	Avg.	HR	RBI
Gene Woodling	133	413	114	.276	15	65
Dick Williams	128	409	113	.276	4	32
Foster Castleman	48	200	34	.170	3	14
Jim Marshall	85	191	41	.215	5	19
Joe Ginsberg	61	109	23	.211	3	16
Lenny Green	69	91	21	.231	0	4
Joe Taylor	36	77	21	.273	2	9
Willie Tasby	18	50	10	.200	1	1
Bob Hale	19	20	7	.350	0	3
Ron Hansen	12	19	0	.000	0	1
Jerry Adair	11	19	2	.105	0	0
Chuck Oertel	14	12	2	.167	1	1
Leo Burke	7	11	5	.455	1	4
Bert Hamric	8	8	1	.125	0	0
Eddie Miksis	3	2	0	.000	0	0
Frank Zupo	1	2	0	.000	0	0

=== Pitching ===
==== Starting pitchers ====
Note: G = Games pitched; IP = Innings pitched; W = Wins; L = Losses; ERA = Earned run average; SO = Strikeouts

Player	G	IP	W	L	ERA	SO
Jack Harshman	34	236.1	12	15	2.89	161
Arnie Portocarrero	32	204.2	15	11	3.25	90
Hal Brown	19	96.2	7	5	3.07	44

==== Other pitchers ====
Note: G = Games pitched; IP = Innings pitched; W = Wins; L = Losses; ERA = Earned run average; SO = Strikeouts

Player	G	IP	W	L	ERA	SO
Billy O'Dell	41	221.1	14	11	2.97	137
Milt Pappas	31	135.1	10	10	4.06	72
Connie Johnson	26	118.1	6	9	3.88	68
Billy Loes	32	114.0	3	9	3.63	44
Charlie Beamon	21	49.2	1	3	4.35	26
Hoyt Wilhelm	9	40.2	1	3	1.99	35

==== Relief pitchers ====
Note: G = Games pitched; W = Wins; L = Losses; SV = Saves; ERA = Earned run average; SO = Strikeouts

Player	G	W	L	SV	ERA	SO
George Zuverink	45	2	2	7	3.39	22
Ken Lehman	31	2	1	0	3.48	36
Jerry Walker	6	0	0	0	6.97	6
Lou Sleater	6	1	0	0	12.86	5
Ron Moeller	4	0	0	0	4.15	3

== Farm system ==
Level	Team	League	Manager
AAA	Louisville Colonels	American Association	Del Wilber
AAA	Vancouver Mounties	Pacific Coast League	Charlie Metro
AA	San Antonio Missions	Texas League	Grady Hatton
A	Knoxville Smokies	Sally League	George Staller
B	Wilson Tobs	Carolina League	Bob Hooper and Barney Lutz
C	Aberdeen Pheasants	Northern League	Barney Lutz and Billy DeMars
D	Pensacola Dons	Alabama–Florida League	Lou Fitzgerald
D	Bluefield Orioles	Appalachian League	Barney Lutz, Fred Hofmann and Bob Hooper
D	Dublin Orioles	Georgia–Florida League	Earl Weaver
