= Herb Plews =

American baseball player (1928–2014)

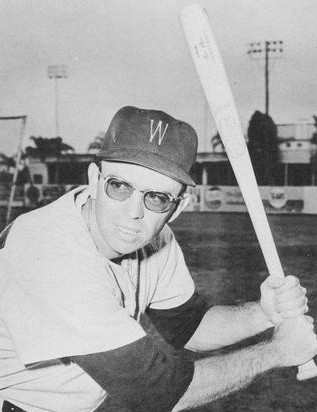
- Plews in 1959
- Second baseman
- Born: June 14, 1928; East Helena, Montana, U.S.
- Died: December 12, 2014 (aged 86); Boulder, Colorado, U.S.
- Batted: Left Threw: Right

MLB debut
- April 18, 1956, for the Washington Senators

Last MLB appearance
- July 26, 1959, for the Boston Red Sox

MLB statistics
- Batting average: .262
- Home runs: 4
- Runs batted in: 82
- Stats at Baseball Reference

Teams
- Washington Senators (1956–1959); Boston Red Sox (1959)

Herbert Eugene Plews (June 14, 1928 – December 12, 2014) was an American Major League Baseball second baseman. He played four years in the majors, from 1956 to 1959 with the Washington Senators and in 1959 for the Boston Red Sox. In the minor leagues he played for Kansas City, Binghamton, Norfolk, and Denver before reaching the majors in 1956, and Toronto, Birmingham, Hawaii, Tacoma, and Arkansas after his major league career ended. During his playing career he served in the military from 1951 to 1952, during the Korean War. Plews batted left-handed and threw right-handed; he was listed as 5 feet 11 inches (1.80 m) tall and 160 pounds (73 kg).

Born in East Helena, Montana, Plews would be (at the time of his death) the only player from the Helena area to reach the major leagues. After four years at the University of Illinois at Urbana-Champaign, he signed with the New York Yankees in 1950. Plews's time in the minor leagues was interrupted by his military service, but he had made it to the Denver Bears (the top affiliate of the Yankees' system) by 1955. After the season, though, he was sent to the Senators in a multi-player trade. Plews debuted with Washington in 1956 and started at second base for them over much of the next three years. Mostly a part-time player in 1959, he was traded to the Red Sox in July, appearing in just 13 more games before being sent to the minors. He played six more years of professional baseball before retiring at the end of 1965. After his baseball career, Plews worked in cement plants, first in Montana and then in the Denver area. He died in 2014.

== Early life ==
Plews was born in East Helena, Montana, on June 14, 1928. His father, also named Herbert (though his middle name was different), was a stereotyper for the Montana Herald-Record. The older Plews was also a pitcher for the local town baseball team, and he taught his son the game. Plews grew up in East Helena and was a sprinter and broad jumper at Helena High School before his graduation in 1946. Though the high school did not have a baseball team, Plews also batted .400 playing American Legion baseball and was once selected as the Montana representative in a National High School All-Star Game sponsored by Esquire; Ty Cobb coached his team.

It was Plews's dream to attend a Big Nine Conference university. A Helena resident told him that the University of Illinois at Urbana-Champaign had a very good baseball program, and Plews contacted Wally Roettger, the coach, who informed him he could play on the team as a freshman as a result of World War II just ending (most years, freshmen were not allowed to play). In his sophomore year, 1948, Plews was voted the Illini baseball Most Valuable Player. One year, Plews led the Big Nine with a .404 batting average. He batted .412 against Big Nine Conference opponents. Following his senior year (in which he served as the team captain), he signed with the New York Yankees, his favorite team growing up. "I had always favored the Yankees because we heard them every weekend, it seemed like," Plews said. "The Yankees were always one of the teams that played on the radio. I just grew to like them and was always excited about them." Lou Maguolo was the scout who signed him.

== Early career ==
On June 17, 1950, Plews played in his first professional baseball game for the Class AAA Kansas City Blues of the American Association. He entered the game as a replacement in the eighth inning and stole a base on his first career attempt. His stint for the Blues was brief, as he appeared in two games but did not record an official at bat. Plews spent more of the year with the Class B Quincy Gems of the Illinois-Indiana-Iowa League, tallying 13 hits as part of a .298 batting average in 13 games. During a late-afternoon game, as the sun was going down, Plews was hit by a pitch, suffering a fractured skull. He spent about four days in the hospital, then returned to Montana, not playing again for the rest of the year.

Plews's career was put on hold for the next two years as the Korean War broke out; he was drafted by the United States Army and sent to Camp Drake, located northwest of Tokyo in Japan. Part of the infantry, he might have seen front line service, except that the colonel in charge of Camp Drake, upon learning he was a baseball player, assigned him to stay at the camp and play on the baseball team. Completing his service in 1953, Plews returned to the states without ever having to serve in combat.

In January 1953, Plews was invited to attend spring training with the Yankees. He stuck with the team until April, when he was assigned to the minor league Class A Binghamton Triplets of the Eastern League before the start of the season. Plews played 28 games for Binghamton but was reassigned to the Class B Norfolk Tars because the Yankees had a double play combination at Binghamton, the Charnofsky twins, that they wanted to play together–with the Charnofskys playing every day, Plews, a second baseman, would have gotten very little playing time. At Norfolk, he had immediate success. Through his first 53 games in the Piedmont League, he hit for a .323 batting average, one of the highest in the league, second only to teammate Jerry Lynch's mark of .331. Plews ended the season with a .304 average, good enough for sixth in the league, two home runs, and 111 hits.

During 1954 spring training, Plews and teammate Jim Ludtka accomplished the rare feat of hitting two Inside-the-park home runs in a single game, both coming against pitcher Roger Higgins of the Little Rock Travelers. Plews spent the season with the Class AA Birmingham Barons of the Southern Association. In 129 games, he batted .299 with 157 hits and nine home runs. He led the Southern Association in triples, with 16. He moved up to Class AAA in 1955 with the Denver Bears of the American Association. In 140 games, he batted .302 with 160 hits, no home runs, and 44 runs batted in (RBI). Plews ranked among the league leaders in runs scored (100, eighth), triples (11, tied with Don Blasingame for third), and stolen bases (nine, ninth). His strong year at Denver drew the attention of the Washington Senators, who traded Mickey McDermott and Bobby Kline to the Yankees for Plews, Lou Berberet, Dick Tettelbach, Bob Wiesler, and a player to be named later (eventually Whitey Herzog) before the 1956 season began.

== Major league career ==
Plews joined the Senators for 1956 spring training and was added to their roster for 1956. He made his debut with the Senators against the Yankees, on April 18, 1956, at Griffith Stadium, pinch-hitting and driving in a run in the eighth inning, though New York won 9–5. He was used mostly as a pinch-hitter for his first four months in the major leagues. On July 27, though, he became the team's starting second baseman, replacing Tony Roig. Plews batted .450 over his next ten games, raising his batting average to .316 with a four-hit (three-double) performance in a 12–2 loss to the Yankees on August 8. In the first game of a doubleheader against the Chicago White Sox on August 28, Plews hit his first (and only) home run of the season against Bob Keegan as the Senators won 6–2. Bob Addie of the Washington Post speculated on August 29 that Plews, Bereberet, or Herzog might be contenders for the American League (AL) Rookie of the Year Award, though Luis Aparicio was the eventual winner. Plews played in 91 games in his rookie season and batted .270 with 24 runs scored, 69 hits, and 25 RBI.

In 1957, Plews began the year as the Senators' starting second baseman. On June 15, he had three hits, including an RBI triple against Bill Fischer and scored three runs as the Senators beat the White Sox 9–1. He batted .261 through June 23, then lost the starting role to Rocky Bridges. Plews started at third base from July 11 through 16 and played second base every day from August 13 through 20 but other than that received only occasional spots or was used as a late-inning replacement for the rest of the season. On July 13, he had two hits, scored two runs, and hit his second career home run (also against Keegan) as the Senators lost 7–4 to the White Sox. Five times during the year, he had a season-high three hits: May 13, May 18, June 15, July 11, and August 14. Plews played 104 games this year and batted .271 with 51 runs scored, 89 hits, one home run, and 26 RBI.

In its 1958 preview of the Senators, Sports Illustrated hinted that Plews might have competition at second base from Bob Malkmus, whom the Senators had just drafted from the Braves' farm system. After playing the opening three games of 1958, Plews found himself benched in favor of Malkmus. Starting in the second game of a doubleheader on May 18, though, he took over the third base job from Eddie Yost, who was batting .208. On May 23, 1958, Plews had a first-inning single against Cal McLish, stole second base, and scored on Neil Chrisley's single; however, that was the only run the Senators scored that day, as they lost 2–1 to the Cleveland Indians. Two days later, in the first game of a doubleheader against the Tigers, Plews hit a home run against Hall of Famer Jim Bunning in a 7–2 loss. Yost played third again from May 27 through May 31, but after that, Plews played the position primarily through June 15. After that, Plews was used intermittently as a second baseman, third baseman, and pinch hitter until the end of July, when he became the starting second baseman for most of the rest of the season. On September 9, he hit his only other home run of the year, also against Bunning, as the Tigers beat the Senators 7–1. In a career-high 111 games, Plews batted .258 with 46 runs scored, 98 hits, and 29 RBI.

Plews lost his starting role completely in 1959, as Reno Bertoia became the Senators' everyday second baseman. Plews appeared in a mere 27 games through June 10, batting .225 with nine hits in 40 at bats. On June 11, 1959, Plews was traded by Washington with pitcher Dick Hyde to the Boston Red Sox, in exchange for infielder Billy Consolo and pitcher Murray Wall. Hyde, who was subsequently found to be suffering from an arm injury, was returned to the Senators, and Wall was returned to the Red Sox on June 14. The Red Sox did not use Plews much more than the Senators had, playing him in just 13 games (in which Plews recorded only 12 at bats). On July 26, he pinch-hit for pitcher Tom Brewer and hit into a double play in a 5–4 loss to the Kansas City Athletics. Two days later, Plews and Wall were both sent to the minor leagues so Boston could call up Earl Wilson and Jim Mahoney. Plews would never appear in another major league game.

== Later career ==
Plews finished out the 1959 season with the Minneapolis Millers of the American Association, batting .252 in 46 games. He spent the 1960 season with the Toronto Maple Leafs of the Class AAA International League, hoping to get called up by the Cleveland Indians. In 81 games, Plews batted .278 with 24 runs scored, 54 hits, no home runs, and 19 RBI, but he was never called up. Beginning 1961 with Toronto, he batted a mere .161 in 31 at bats before getting demoted to the Birmingham Barons of the Southern Association. In 82 games, he batted a career-high .372 and recorded 112 hits in 301 at bats.

From 1962 through 1964, Plews played for the Hawaii Islanders of the Class AAA Pacific Coast League (PCL). In 1962, he played 138 games, batting .245 with 66 runs scored, 127 hits, seven home runs, and 41 RBI. Next season, he played 135 games, batting .271 with 65 hits, 124 hits, two home runs, and 52 RBI. His final year with the Islanders, he played 131 games, batting .293 with 59 runs scored, 120 hits, eight home runs, and 39 RBI.

In 1965, Plews began the season with the Tacoma Giants of the PCL, with whom he played 15 games. He also played 66 games for the Arkansas Travelers of the PCL, batting .154 between the two teams. After the season, Plews retired.

Plews played 346 major league games over four years, batting .262 with 125 runs scored, 266 hits, four home runs, and 82 RBI. However, he was best known for his defensive abilities. He had a lifetime fielding percentage of .967 at second base. Plews said of his career, "I enjoyed every minute of it, and if I had to do it over, I would certainly do the same thing." He kept in touch with Yost and Roy Sievers once his playing days were over.

== Personal life ==
In 1955, Plews married Shirley Mae Williams, a dental assistant. They had one child, son Reese. The couple continued to live in Montana during his offseasons, when Plews worked as a mailman. During the seasons, Shirley rarely missed attending his games. When Plews reached the major leagues, Congressman Lee Metcalf was so excited over this development that he read all the details of Plews's baseball career into the Congressional Record on April 17, 1956. After retirement, Plews played handball as a hobby, winning several championships in his town. He was one of the inaugural members of the Helena Sports Hall of Fame (inducted 2003) and the Helena Senators Baseball Hall of Fame (inducted 2014).

After retiring from baseball, Plews worked for cement plants. First, he worked for a Kaiser Permanente plant in Montana, but later, he moved to Colorado, where he worked at one in the Denver area started by former major leaguer Dale Mitchell. In 2006, he and Shirley moved to a retirement community in Boulder, Colorado. Shirley died of cancer in 2009, and Plews died on December 12, 2014. At the time of his death, he was the only athlete from the Helena area to play Major League Baseball.
