= Lyle Luttrell =

American baseball player (1930-1984)

- Shortstop
- Born: February 22, 1930; Bloomington, Illinois, U.S.
- Died: July 11, 1984 (aged 54); Chattanooga, Tennessee, U.S.
- Batted: Right Threw: Right

MLB debut
- May 15, 1956, for the Washington Senators

Last MLB appearance
- May 16, 1957, for the Washington Senators

MLB statistics
- Batting average: .192
- Home runs: 2
- Runs batted in: 14
- Stats at Baseball Reference

Teams
- Washington Senators (1956–1957)

Lyle Kenneth Luttrell (February 22, 1930 – July 11, 1984) was an American professional baseball player during the 1950s. A shortstop, he appeared in 57 games for the Washington Senators of Major League Baseball during the 1956–1957 seasons. He threw and batted right-handed and was listed at 6 ft (1.8 m), 180 lb (82 kg).

Born in Bloomington, Illinois, Luttrell attended Illinois Wesleyan University before signing with the Washington organization during the 1951 season. He missed 1952–1953 because of military service, but was called to the Majors during his most productive minor league season, when he batted .324 with 149 hits for the 1956 Chattanooga Lookouts of the Double-A Southern Association. In two trials with the Senators, he vied for playing time at shortstop with José Valdivielso, Rocky Bridges and Jerry Snyder among others, collecting 32 hits in 167 at bats, including nine doubles, three triples and two home runs. He retired after the 1959 minor league season and died in Chattanooga, Tennessee, from a heart attack at the age of 54.
