= Chrisley =

Chrisley is a surname. Notable people with the surname include:

- Neil Chrisley (1931–2013), American baseball player
- Todd Chrisley, American millionaire and star of reality television series Chrisley Knows Best and husband of Julie Chrisley
- Julie Chrisley, star of Chrisley Knows Best and wife of Todd Chrisley
