= Dick Brodowski =

American baseball player (1932–2019)

- Pitcher
- Born: July 26, 1932; Bayonne, New Jersey, U.S.
- Died: January 14, 2019 (aged 86); Lynn, Massachusetts, U.S.
- Batted: Right Threw: Right

MLB debut
- June 15, 1952, for the Boston Red Sox

Last MLB appearance
- July 4, 1959, for the Cleveland Indians

MLB statistics
- Win–loss record: 9–11
- Earned run average: 4.76
- Strikeouts: 85
- Stats at Baseball Reference

Teams
- Boston Red Sox (1952, 1955); Washington Senators (1956–1957); Cleveland Indians (1958–1959)

Richard Stanley Brodowski (July 26, 1932 – January 14, 2019) was an American professional baseball pitcher, who played in Major League Baseball (MLB) for the Boston Red Sox, Washington Senators, and Cleveland Indians in 1952 and from 1955 to 1959. He batted and threw right-handed, stood 6 feet 1 inch (1.85 m) tall and weighed 185 pounds (84 kg).

Brodowski attended Sweeney Senior High School (now Bayonne High School).

== Early life ==
Brodowski was born in Bayonne, New Jersey, on July 26, 1932. His father, Andrew Brodowski, had emigrated to the United States from Poland at about age 10 to 12, and worked as a lead burner in an oil refinery. His mother, Anna, came from Poland when she was around five. "I remember them talking about how they used to bring the family from Europe to the United States," Dick recalled in a 2016 interview. Did they speak Polish in the home at Bayonne? "Just a little. Just when they wanted to get stuff by the kids." Dick had two older brothers, John and Henry. At the time of the 1940 census, John was 19 and employed as a welder in an iron works. Dick grew up in the city and graduated from Sweeney Senior High School, playing baseball – initially shortstop – in CYO ball and high school, and at least four professional organizations scouted him. Brodowski was signed by Boston Red Sox scout Bill McCarren.

== Baseball career ==
=== Minor leagues ===
Brodowski signed with the Red Sox in 1951, initially to play as a third baseman; in his first pro season, the team's pitchers were decimated with injuries, causing his manager to call on him to join the team's mound staff. That season — along with playing 74 games at third (with a batting average of .276) — Brodowski won 21 games (in 26 decisions), while playing for the Marion Red Sox, in the Class D Ohio–Indiana League.

In 1952, after being promoted all the way up to the Triple-A American Association Louisville Colonels, Brodowski went 7–1 in ten starting assignments with seven complete games, all of which quickly earned him a call up to the big league team.

=== Major leagues ===
Brodowski made his MLB debut with the Red Sox, on June 14, 1952, at the age of 19. In 20 games pitched (12 of them as a starter), he posted a respectable 5–5 record and 4.41 earned run average (ERA), while notching four complete games. One of those early victories was a 4-hit, 4–3 triumph against the American League (AL) champion New York Yankees, prompting none other than perennial All-Star Hall of Fame catcher Yogi Berra to comment as to Brodowski's own impending potential for stardom. Brodowski accomplished this while taking his turn every fifth day, in a much-venerated pitching rotation which included Mel Parnell, Mickey McDermott, Dizzy Trout, and Sid Hudson; however, Brodowski spent 1953–54 in military service, in the US Army, stationed stateside at Fort Dix, New Jersey, during the Korean War period. Upon his 1955 return to baseball, Brodowski became largely ineffective. He would spend just one more season with Boston, going 1–0 with a 5.63 ERA, before being traded to the Washington Senators, along with minor league pitcher Al Curtis, outfielder Neil Chrisley, pitcher Tex Clevenger, and outfielder Karl Olson, for pitcher Bob Porterfield, pitcher Johnny Schmitz, outfielder Tom Umphlett, and first sacker Mickey Vernon, on November 8, 1955.

After just 1 1/2 seasons in our nation's capitol, Brodowski was again traded — this time to the Cleveland Indians — along with outfielder Dick Tettelbach, in exchange for outfielder Bob Usher, on May 15, 1957. Brodowski's last major league pitching appearance came in July 1959, with his active professional career coming to an end while pitching for the Eastern League Reading Indians (Reading, Pennsylvania), early in the 1960 campaign.

In his six-season, 72-game MLB career, Brodowski's stat line included a 9–11 record with five complete games. He also posted five saves, 85 strikeouts, and a 4.76 ERA, in 215 2/3 innings pitched. Brodowski allowed 212 base hits and eight hit batsmen, while issuing 124 bases on balls.

== Personal life and death ==
After concluding his baseball career, Brodowski was a salesman for Metropolitan Life Insurance. He then worked at the Boston engineering firm of Stone & Webster, in the security department, until his retirement.

Brodowski died on January 14, 2019, in Lynn, Massachusetts.
