= 1956 Chicago White Sox season =

1956 Chicago White Sox
- League: American League
- Ballpark: Comiskey Park
- City: Chicago
- Owners: Grace Comiskey, Dorothy Comiskey Rigney
- General managers: Chuck Comiskey/Johnny Rigney
- Managers: Marty Marion
- Television: WGN-TV (Jack Brickhouse, Harry Creighton, Vince Lloyd)
- Radio: WCFL (Bob Elson, Don Wells)

The 1956 Chicago White Sox season was the team's 56th season in the major leagues, and its 57th season overall. They finished with a record of 85–69, good enough for third place in the American League, 12 games behind the first place New York Yankees.

== Offseason ==
- October 25, 1955: Chico Carrasquel and Jim Busby were traded by the White Sox to the Cleveland Indians for Larry Doby.

== Regular season ==
=== Season standings ===
American League
Team	W	L	Pct.	GB	Home	Road
New York Yankees	97	57	.630	—	49‍–‍28	48‍–‍29
Cleveland Indians	88	66	.571	9	46‍–‍31	42‍–‍35
Chicago White Sox	85	69	.552	12	46‍–‍31	39‍–‍38
Boston Red Sox	84	70	.545	13	43‍–‍34	41‍–‍36
Detroit Tigers	82	72	.532	15	37‍–‍40	45‍–‍32
Baltimore Orioles	69	85	.448	28	41‍–‍36	28‍–‍49
Washington Senators	59	95	.383	38	32‍–‍45	27‍–‍50
Kansas City Athletics	52	102	.338	45	22‍–‍55	30‍–‍47

=== Record vs. opponents ===
1956 American League record Sources:
Team	BAL	BOS	CWS	CLE	DET	KCA	NYY	WSH
Baltimore	—	6–16	9–13	5–17	13–9	15–7	9–13	12–10
Boston	16–6	—	14–8	13–9–1	12–10	12–10	8–14	9–13
Chicago	13–9	8–14	—	15–7	13–9	14–8	9–13	13–9
Cleveland	17–5	9–13–1	7–15	—	11–11	17–5	10–12	17–5
Detroit	9–13	10–12	9–13	11–11	—	16–6	12–10	15–7–1
Kansas City	7–15	10–12	8–14	5–17	6–16	—	4–18	12–10
New York	13–9	14–8	13–9	12–10	10–12	18–4	—	17–5
Washington	10–12	13–9	9–13	5–17	7–15–1	10–12	5–17	—

=== Opening Day lineup ===
- Jim Rivera, RF
- Nellie Fox, 2B
- Larry Doby, CF
- Bob Kennedy, 3B
- Minnie Miñoso, LF
- Sherm Lollar, C
- Walt Dropo, 1B
- Luis Aparicio, SS
- Billy Pierce, P

=== Notable transactions ===
- April 16, 1956: Carl Sawatski was purchased from the White Sox by the Toronto Maple Leafs.
- May 15, 1956: Jim Brideweser, Harry Byrd and Bob Kennedy were traded by the White Sox to the Detroit Tigers for Jim Delsing and Fred Hatfield.
- May 21, 1956: Mike Fornieles, Connie Johnson, George Kell and Bob Nieman were traded by the White Sox to the Baltimore Orioles for Dave Philley and Jim Wilson.
- May 28, 1956: Gerry Staley was selected off waivers by the White Sox from the New York Yankees.
- July 13, 1956: Morrie Martin was selected off waivers from the White Sox by the Baltimore Orioles.

=== Roster ===
1956 Chicago White Sox
Roster
Pitchers: 32 Harry Byrd; 20 Sandy Consuegra; 31 Jerry Dahlke; 18 Jim Derrington; 22 Dick Donovan; 27 Bill Fischer; 16 Mike Fornieles; 29 Jack Harshman; 28 Dixie Howell; 44 Connie Johnson; 15 Bob Keegan; 27 Ellis Kinder; 31 Paul LaPalme; 24 Dick Marlowe; 36 Morrie Martin; 36 Jim McDonald; 19 Billy Pierce; 24 Howie Pollet; 66,21 Gerry Staley; 30 Jim Wilson	Catchers: 26 Earl Battey; 10 Sherm Lollar; 12 Les Moss; Infielders: 11 Luis Aparicio; 3 Jim Brideweser; 8 Walt Dropo; 48 Sammy Esposito; 2 Nellie Fox; 3 Fred Hatfield; 42 Ron Jackson; 1 George Kell; 30 Bob Kennedy; 6 Dave Philley	Outfielders: 25 Cal Abrams; 25 Jim Delsing; 14 Larry Doby; 9 Minnie Miñoso; 18 Bob Nieman; 6,32 Ron Northey; 5 Bubba Phillips; 7 Jim Rivera	Manager: 4 Marty Marion; Coaches: 37 Ray Berres; 39 Don Gutteridge; 34 George Myatt; 33 Del Wilber

== Player stats ==
= Indicates team leader

= Indicates league leader

=== Batting ===
Note: G = Games played; AB = At bats; R = Runs scored; H = Hits; 2B = Doubles; 3B = Triples; HR = Home runs; RBI = Runs batted in; BB = Base on balls; SO = Strikeouts; AVG = Batting average; SB = Stolen bases

Player	G	AB	R	H	2B	3B	HR	RBI	BB	SO	AVG	SB
Cal Abrams, OF	4	3	0	1	0	0	0	0	2	1	.333	0
Luis Aparicio, SS	152	533	69	142	19	6	3	56	34	63	.266	21
Earl Battey, C	4	4	1	1	0	0	0	0	1	1	.250	0
Jim Brideweser, SS	10	11	0	2	1	0	0	1	0	3	.182	0
Jim Delsing, OF	55	41	11	5	3	0	0	2	10	13	.122	1
Larry Doby, CF	140	504	89	135	22	3	24	102	102	105	.268	0
Walt Dropo, 1B	125	361	42	96	13	1	8	52	37	51	.266	1
Sammy Esposito, 3B, SS	81	184	30	42	8	2	3	25	41	19	.228	1
Nellie Fox, 2B	154	649	109	192	20	10	4	52	44	14	.296	8
Fred Hatfield, 3B	106	321	46	84	9	1	7	33	37	36	.262	1
Ron Jackson, 1B	22	56	7	12	3	0	1	4	10	13	.214	1
George Kell, 3B, 1B	21	80	7	25	5	0	1	11	8	6	.313	0
Bob Kennedy, 3B	8	13	0	1	0	0	0	0	2	4	.077	0
Sherm Lollar, C	136	450	55	132	28	2	11	75	53	34	.293	2
Minnie Miñoso, LF	151	545	106	172	29	11	21	88	86	40	.316	12
Les Moss, C	56	127	20	31	4	0	10	22	18	15	.244	0
Bob Nieman, RF	14	40	3	12	1	0	2	4	4	4	.300	0
Ron Northey, OF	53	48	4	17	2	0	3	23	8	1	.354	0
Dave Philley, 1B, RF, LF	86	279	44	74	14	2	4	47	28	27	.265	1
Bubba Phillips, OF	67	99	16	27	6	0	2	11	6	12	.273	1
Jim Rivera, RF, CF	139	491	76	125	23	5	12	66	49	75	.255	20

Player	G	AB	R	H	2B	3B	HR	RBI	BB	SO	AVG	SB
Harry Byrd, P	3	1	0	0	0	0	0	0	0	0	.000	0
Sandy Consuegra, P	28	4	0	0	0	0	0	0	0	2	.000	0
Jim Derrington, P	1	2	0	1	0	0	0	0	0	1	.500	0
Dick Donovan, P	44	90	10	20	4	0	3	15	14	30	.222	0
Mike Fornieles, P	6	5	0	1	1	0	0	0	0	1	.200	0
Jack Harshman, P	36	71	8	12	1	0	6	19	11	21	.169	0
Dixie Howell, P	34	17	4	4	0	0	2	3	2	6	.235	0
Connie Johnson, P	5	3	0	0	0	0	0	0	0	1	.000	0
Bob Keegan, P	20	32	2	4	0	0	0	1	4	7	.125	0
Ellis Kinder, P	29	2	0	0	0	0	0	0	0	1	.000	0
Paul LaPalme, P	29	6	0	0	0	0	0	1	0	3	.000	0
Morrie Martin, P	10	5	1	1	0	0	0	0	1	1	.200	0
Jim McDonald, P	8	5	1	0	0	0	0	0	1	3	.000	0
Billy Pierce, P	39	102	6	16	0	0	0	3	3	22	.157	0
Howie Pollet, P	12	8	1	3	0	0	0	1	0	3	.375	0
Gerry Staley, P	26	32	2	3	0	0	0	1	2	6	.094	0
Jim Wilson, P	28	62	6	19	2	0	1	8	1	13	.306	0
Team totals	154	5286	776	1412	218	43	128	726	619	658	.267	70

=== Pitching ===
Note: W = Wins; L = Losses; ERA = Earned run average; G = Games pitched; GS = Games started; SV = Saves; IP = Innings pitched; H = Hits allowed; R = Runs allowed; ER = Earned runs allowed; HR = Home runs allowed; BB = Walks allowed; K = Strikeouts

Player	W	L	ERA	G	GS	SV	IP	H	R	ER	HR	BB	K
Harry Byrd	0	1	10.38	3	1	0	4.1	9	6	5	0	4	0
Sandy Consuegra	1	2	5.17	28	1	3	38.1	45	25	22	0	14	7
Jerry Dahlke	0	0	19.29	5	0	0	2.1	5	5	5	0	6	1
Jim Derrington	0	1	7.50	1	1	0	6.0	9	6	5	2	6	3
Dick Donovan	12	10	3.64	34	31	0	234.2	212	99	95	22	95	120
Bill Fischer	0	0	21.60	3	0	0	1.2	6	4	4	0	1	2
Mike Fornieles	0	1	4.60	6	0	0	15.2	22	9	8	1	7	6
Jack Harshman	15	11	3.10	34	30	0	226.2	183	85	78	14	106	143
Dixie Howell	5	6	4.62	34	1	4	64.1	79	39	33	3	46	28
Connie Johnson	0	1	3.65	5	2	0	12.1	11	5	5	1	7	6
Bob Keegan	5	7	3.93	20	16	0	105.1	119	56	46	15	37	32
Ellis Kinder	3	1	2.73	29	0	3	29.2	33	10	9	2	8	19
Paul LaPalme	3	1	2.36	29	0	2	45.2	31	14	12	2	29	23
Dick Marlowe	0	0	9.00	1	0	0	1.0	2	1	1	1	1	0
Morrie Martin	1	0	4.91	10	0	0	18.1	21	10	10	1	7	9
Jim McDonald	0	2	8.68	8	3	0	18.2	29	18	18	2	7	10
Billy Pierce	20	9	3.32	35	33	1	276.1	261	108	102	24	107	192
Howie Pollet	3	1	4.10	11	4	0	26.1	27	15	12	2	11	14
Gerry Staley	8	3	2.92	26	10	0	101.2	98	37	33	11	23	25
Jim Wilson	9	12	4.06	28	21	0	159.2	149	82	72	15	75	82
Team totals	85	69	3.73	154	154	13	1389.0	1351	634	575	118	567	722

== Farm system ==
Level	Team	League	Manager
AA	Memphis Chicks	Southern Association	Jack Cassini and Don Griffin
A	Colorado Springs Sky Sox	Western League	Jack Conway
B	Waterloo White Hawks	Illinois–Indiana–Iowa League	Ira Hutchinson
C	Duluth-Superior White Sox	Northern League	Joe Hauser
D	Dubuque Packers	Midwest League	George Noga
D	Holdrege White Sox	Nebraska State League	Skeeter Scalzi

LEAGUE CHAMPIONS: Duluth-Superior
