= Bob Wiesler =

American baseball player (1930-2014)

- Pitcher
- Born: August 13, 1930; St. Louis, Missouri, U.S.
- Died: August 10, 2014 (aged 83); Florissant, Missouri, U.S.
- Batted: Both Threw: Left

MLB debut
- August 3, 1951, for the New York Yankees

Last MLB appearance
- May 10, 1958, for the Washington Senators

MLB statistics
- Win–loss record: 7–19
- Earned run average: 3.93
- Strikeouts: 113
- Stats at Baseball Reference

Teams
- New York Yankees (1951, 1954–1955); Washington Senators (1956–1958)

Robert George Wiesler (August 13, 1930 – August 10, 2014) was an American pitcher in Major League Baseball who played for the New York Yankees and Washington Senators in parts of five seasons spanning 1951–1958. Listed at 6' 3", 188 lb., he was a switch-hitter and threw left-handed.

Wiesler was signed by the Yankees as an amateur free agent in 1949 out of Beaumont High School in St. Louis, Missouri. He was assigned immediately to the Independence Yankees of the Kansas–Oklahoma–Missouri League, where he posted a 12-11 record with a league-leading 240 strikeouts in 185 innings, helping his team to win the regular season pennant and the playoffs.

Wiesler gained a promotion to the Joplin Miners in 1950, and he simply dominated, going 15-7 with 11 complete games and two shutouts, while leading the Western Association with a 2.35 ERA and 277 strikeouts, en route to a league pennant and an All-Star recognition.

The strong armed lefty opened 1951 with the Kansas City Blues of the American Association, and he responded with a 10-9 mark and a 2.92 ERA in a career-high 194 innings, striking out 162 batters to claim his third strikeout title in a row. He joined the Yankees on August 3 of this year and lost two decisions in four appearances. He was then called up for military service, missing the 1952 season while serving with the United States Army during the Korean War conflict.

Following his discharge, Weisler pitched for the Yankees in parts of two seasons. In 1954, he went 3-2 with a 4.15 ERA in five starts and one relief appearance, and 0-2 with a 3.91 ERA in 16 games (seven starts) in 1955.

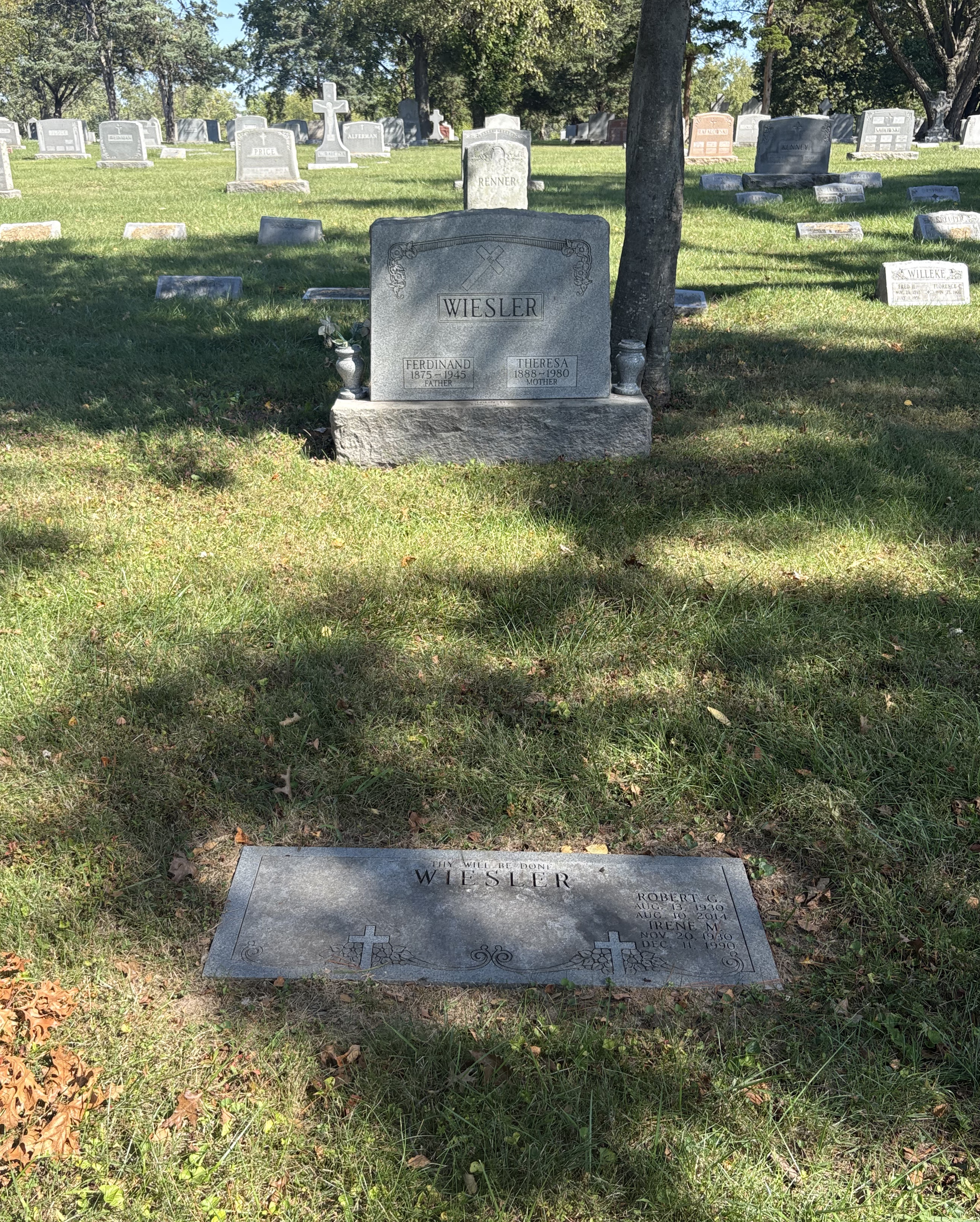
Wiesler's grave at Calvary Cemetery

Prior to the start of the 1956 season, he was traded to the Senators along with Lou Berberet, Whitey Herzog, Herb Plews and Dick Tettelbach, in exchange for Bobby Kline and Mickey McDermott.

Wiesler had a 3-12 record and a 6.44 ERA in 37 games for Washington in 1956, which included 21 starts, three complete games and a five-hit, one run performance against the Detroit Tigers at Briggs Stadium.

He spent most of the 1957 season with Triple-A Richmond Virginians, where he went 12-12 with a 3.75 ERA in 33 games. He also appeared in three games (two starts) for the Senators, going 1-1 with a 4.41 in 16 1/3 innings. In his last game of the season, he pitched a seven-hit, one run complete game against the Baltimore Orioles at Memorial Stadium.

Wiesler returned to Richmond in 1958, ending with a 13-9 mark and a 3.07 ERA in 24 starts before joining the Senators late in the season. He was used strictly as a reliever in four games with Washington, where he posted a 6.75 ERA without a decision in 9 1/3 innings of work. In a six-season major league career, Weisler finished with a 7-19 record and a 5.74 ERA in 70 games.

He enjoyed a solid career in the Minor Leagues during 10 seasons between 1949 and 1961, posting a 91-78 record and a 3.70 ERA in 276 pitching appearances.

In between, he played winter ball with the Leones del Caracas club of the Venezuelan League in the 1954–1955 tournament, as part of a pitching staff that included Don Bessent, José Bracho, Howie Fox, Bill Werle and Luis Zuloaga.

He was signed by Yankees scout Lou Maguolo.

After baseball, Wiesler was employed with the Anheuser-Busch Brewery company in St. Louis. Following his retirement, he moved to Florissant, Missouri, where he died in 2014 at the age of 83. He was buried at Calvary Cemetery in St. Louis.
