= Dahlke =

Dahlke is a German surname. Notable people with the surname include:

- Jerry Dahlke (1929–2006), American baseball pitcher
- Kurt Dahlke (born 1958) aka Pyrolator, German musician and producer
- Paul Dahlke (actor) (1904–1984), German stage and film actor
- Paul Dahlke (Buddhist) (1865–1928), German physician and Buddhist
