= 1956 Detroit Tigers season =

Major League Baseball season

1956 Detroit Tigers
- League: American League
- Ballpark: Briggs Stadium
- City: Detroit, Michigan
- Record: 82–72 (.532)
- League place: 5th
- Owners: Walter Briggs, Jr., Fred Knorr, John Fetzer
- General managers: Muddy Ruel
- Managers: Bucky Harris
- Television: WJBK
- Radio: WKMH (Van Patrick, Mel Ott)

The 1956 Detroit Tigers season was a season in American baseball. The team finished fifth in the American League with a record of 82–72, 15 games behind the New York Yankees.

== Offseason ==
- December 30, 1955: Leo Cristante and cash were traded by the Tigers to the Brooklyn Dodgers for Pete Wojey.
- Prior to 1956 season: Howie Koplitz was signed as an amateur free agent by the Tigers.

== Regular season ==
=== Season standings ===
American League
Team	W	L	Pct.	GB	Home	Road
New York Yankees	97	57	.630	—	49‍–‍28	48‍–‍29
Cleveland Indians	88	66	.571	9	46‍–‍31	42‍–‍35
Chicago White Sox	85	69	.552	12	46‍–‍31	39‍–‍38
Boston Red Sox	84	70	.545	13	43‍–‍34	41‍–‍36
Detroit Tigers	82	72	.532	15	37‍–‍40	45‍–‍32
Baltimore Orioles	69	85	.448	28	41‍–‍36	28‍–‍49
Washington Senators	59	95	.383	38	32‍–‍45	27‍–‍50
Kansas City Athletics	52	102	.338	45	22‍–‍55	30‍–‍47

=== Record vs. opponents ===
1956 American League record Sources:
Team	BAL	BOS	CWS	CLE	DET	KCA	NYY	WSH
Baltimore	—	6–16	9–13	5–17	13–9	15–7	9–13	12–10
Boston	16–6	—	14–8	13–9–1	12–10	12–10	8–14	9–13
Chicago	13–9	8–14	—	15–7	13–9	14–8	9–13	13–9
Cleveland	17–5	9–13–1	7–15	—	11–11	17–5	10–12	17–5
Detroit	9–13	10–12	9–13	11–11	—	16–6	12–10	15–7–1
Kansas City	7–15	10–12	8–14	5–17	6–16	—	4–18	12–10
New York	13–9	14–8	13–9	12–10	10–12	18–4	—	17–5
Washington	10–12	13–9	9–13	5–17	7–15–1	10–12	5–17	—

=== Notable transactions ===
- May 15, 1956: Jim Delsing and Fred Hatfield were traded by the Tigers to the Chicago White Sox for Jim Brideweser, Harry Byrd and Bob Kennedy.

=== Roster ===
1956 Detroit Tigers
Roster
Pitchers: 22 Al Aber; 14 Bud Black; 26 Jim Brady; 15 Jim Bunning; 21 Paul Foytack; 31 Ned Garver; 18 Steve Gromek; 44 Billy Hoeft; 19 Gene Host; 17 Frank Lary; 47 Duke Maas; 37 Dick Marlowe; 29 Walt Masterson; 28 Bob Miller; 23 Virgil Trucks; 29 Pete Wojey; 25 Hal Woodeshick	Catchers: 2 Frank House; 12 Charley Lau; 15 Jay Porter; 25 Walt Streuli; 10 Red Wilson; Infielders: 27 Wayne Belardi; 16 Reno Bertoia; 24 Frank Bolling; 8 Ray Boone; 1 Jim Brideweser; 1 Fred Hatfield; 12 Buddy Hicks; 7 Harvey Kuenn; 30 Jack Phillips; 9 Earl Torgeson	Outfielders: 24 Jim Delsing; 6 Al Kaline; 3 Bob Kennedy; 3 Chick King; 4 Charlie Maxwell; 20 Jim Small; 5,13 Bill Tuttle	Manager: 32 Bucky Harris; Coaches: 33 Joe Gordon; 34 Billy Hitchcock; 35 Jack Tighe

== Player stats ==
= Indicates team leader

= Indicates league leader

=== Batting ===
==== Starters by position ====
Note: Pos = Position; G = Games played; AB = At bats; H = Hits; Avg. = Batting average; HR = Home runs; RBI = Runs batted in

Pos	Player	G	AB	H	Avg.	HR	RBI
C	Frank House	94	321	77	.240	10	44
1B	Earl Torgeson	117	318	84	.264	12	42
2B	Frank Bolling	102	366	103	.281	7	45
SS	Harvey Kuenn	146	591	196	.332	12	88
3B	Ray Boone	131	481	148	.308	25	81
OF	Charlie Maxwell	141	500	163	.326	28	87
OF	Bill Tuttle	140	546	138	.253	9	65
OF	Al Kaline	153	617	194	.314	27	128

==== Other batters ====
Note: G = Games played; AB = At bats; H = Hits; Avg. = Batting average; HR = Home runs; RBI = Runs batted in

Player	G	AB	H	Avg.	HR	RBI
Red Wilson	78	228	66	.289	7	38
Jack Phillips	67	224	66	.295	1	20
Bob Kennedy	70	177	41	.232	4	22
Jim Brideweser	70	156	34	.218	0	10
Wayne Belardi	79	154	43	.279	6	15
Jim Small	58	91	29	.319	0	10
Reno Bertoia	22	66	12	.182	1	5
Buddy Hicks	26	47	10	.213	0	5
Jay Porter	14	21	2	.095	0	3
Jim Delsing	10	12	0	.000	0	0
Fred Hatfield	8	12	3	.250	0	2
Chick King	6	9	2	.222	0	0
Charley Lau	3	9	2	.222	0	0
Walt Streuli	3	8	2	.250	0	1

=== Pitching ===
==== Starting pitchers ====
Note: G = Games pitched; IP = Innings pitched; W = Wins; L = Losses; ERA = Earned run average; SO = Strikeouts

Player	G	IP	W	L	ERA	SO
Frank Lary	41	294.0	21	13	3.15	165
Paul Foytack	43	256.0	15	13	3.59	184
Billy Hoeft	38	248.0	20	14	4.06	172
Virgil Trucks	22	120.0	6	5	3.83	43
Hal Woodeshick	2	5.1	0	2	13.50	1
Gene Host	1	4.2	0	0	7.71	5

==== Other pitchers ====
Note: G = Games pitched; IP = Innings pitched; W = Wins; L = Losses; ERA = Earned run average; SO = Strikeouts

Player	G	IP	W	L	ERA	SO
Steve Gromek	40	141.0	8	6	4.28	64
Duke Maas	26	63.1	0	7	6.54	34
Jim Bunning	15	53.1	5	1	3.71	34
Bob Miller	11	31.2	0	2	5.68	16
Ned Garver	6	17.2	0	2	4.08	6
Dick Marlowe	7	11.0	1	1	5.73	4
Bud Black	5	10.0	1	1	3.60	7

==== Relief pitchers ====
Note: G = Games pitched; W = Wins; L = Losses; SV = Saves; ERA = Earned run average; SO = Strikeouts

Player	G	W	L	SV	ERA	SO
Al Aber	42	4	4	7	3.43	21
Walt Masterson	35	1	1	1	4.17	28
Jim Brady	6	0	0	0	28.42	3
Pete Wojey	2	0	0	0	2.25	1

== Farm system ==
Level	Team	League	Manager
AAA	Charleston Senators	American Association	Charlie Metro and Frank Skaff
A	Syracuse Chiefs	Eastern League	Glenn McQuillen, Joe Torpey and Frank Calo
A	Augusta Tigers	Sally League	Frank Skaff, Willis Hudlin and Bill Norman
B	Durham Bulls	Carolina League	Johnny Pesky
B	Terre Haute Tigers	Illinois–Indiana–Iowa League	Bill Norman and Charlie Metro
C	Idaho Falls Russets	Pioneer League	Stan Wasiak and Charlie Metro
D	Panama City Fliers	Alabama–Florida League	Al Lakeman
D	Palatka Tigers	Florida State League	Ralph Hodgin and Charlie Baird
D	Hazlehurst-Baxley Tigers	Georgia State League	Wayne Wallace and Stan Wasiak
D	Valdosta Tigers	Georgia–Florida League	Bill Adair
D	Jamestown Falcons	PONY League	Pat Mullin, Don Lund and Wayne Blackburn

LEAGUE CHAMPIONS: Valdosta
Terre Haute club folded, July 3, 1956
