= Arch McDonald =

American radio broadcaster, sportscaster

- McDonald at WJSV
- Born: May 23, 1901; Hot Springs, Arkansas, U.S.
- Died: October 16, 1960 (aged 59)
- Resting place: Suitland, Maryland
- Occupation: Sports announcer
- Spouse: Cynthia Handley
- Children: 3
- Awards: Ford C. Frick Award (1999)
- Sports commentary career
- Teams: Washington Senators (1934–38, 1940–56); New York Yankees & New York Giants (1939)
- Genre: Play-by-play
- Sport: Major League Baseball

Arch Linn McDonald Sr. (May 23, 1901 – October 16, 1960) was an American radio sportscaster who served as the play-by-play voice of Major League Baseball's Washington Senators from 1934 to 1956, with the exception of 1939, when he broadcast the New York Yankees and New York Giants.

== Biography ==
McDonald was born in Hot Springs, Arkansas, and grew up in Chattanooga, Tennessee. During the early 1930s, he broadcast for the Chattanooga Lookouts, a Minor League Baseball team. In 1932, he won a national contest sponsored by The Sporting News for "the most popular sports broadcaster", garnering 57,960 votes—a remarkable achievement, considering that the Lookouts were a Class A team. Washington Senators owner Clark Griffith jumped McDonald straight to broadcasting for the major league team in 1934, and he immediately became a hit.

McDonald was one of the first to use "ducks on the pond" as a term for players on base, and was notable for quoting an old country tune, "They Cut Down the Old Pine Tree", after a Senators win. He also gave Joe DiMaggio the nickname "the Yankee Clipper". McDonald was best known, however, for his studio re-creations of road games, a common practice in the 1930s, when line charges were too expensive for live road coverage. The radio listeners would hear the click of a ticker tape machine, and the announcer would convey the play; "It's a long fly ball to deep center, going, going... gone. It's a home run." For many years, it was common for Senators fans to crowd around McDonald's studio at a drug store on G Street, near the White House, for his recreations.

In 1939, McDonald became the first full-time voice of the Yankees and Giants, working the second half of the season alongside a young Mel Allen. In June that year, he helped broadcast activities at the opening of the Baseball Hall of Fame in Cooperstown, New York, for CBS. However, his homespun style didn't play well in New York, and he was back in Washington for the 1940 season.

For the most part, McDonald called losing baseball; the Senators only finished higher than fifth four times during his tenure. Despite the team's losing efforts, McDonald was again named outstanding baseball broadcaster in 1942 and 1945. During the 1940s, he began calling Washington Redskins and college football games. McDonald was forced off Senators broadcasts by a sponsor change following their 1956 season, but remained behind the microphone for the Redskins.

=== Personal life ===
McDonald was the Democratic candidate for Maryland's 6th congressional district in the 1946 House of Representatives election, losing to incumbent James Glenn Beall, 58.1% to 41.9%.

McDonald died in 1960, of a heart attack at age 59, while returning to Washington, D.C., via train from a Redskins game in New York City. He was buried in Cedar Hill Cemetery in Suitland, Maryland. In 1999, McDonald was posthumously honored with the Ford C. Frick Award, given annually to one baseball broadcaster.
