= Connie Grob =

American baseball player (1932–1997)

- Pitcher
- Born: November 9, 1932; Cross Plains, Wisconsin, U.S.
- Died: September 28, 1997 (aged 64); Madison, Wisconsin, U.S.
- Batted: Left Threw: Right

MLB debut
- April 22, 1956, for the Washington Senators

Last MLB appearance
- September 15, 1956, for the Washington Senators

MLB statistics
- Win–loss record: 4–5
- Earned run average: 7.83
- Innings pitched: 79 1/3
- Stats at Baseball Reference

Teams
- Washington Senators (1956)

Conrad George Grob (rhymes with "robe"; November 9, 1932 – September 28, 1997) was an American professional baseball player in the 1950s and 1960s. A right-handed pitcher, he spent one full season — 1956 — in Major League Baseball as a member of the Washington Senators. Grob batted left-handed, stood 6 feet (1.8 m) tall and weighed 180 pounds (82 kg).

A native of Cross Plains, Wisconsin, Grob signed originally with the Brooklyn Dodgers before the 1952 season and won 24 games (losing five) in his debut year in the Class D Wisconsin State League. After two years in military service, the Dodgers moved him up to the Double-A Southern Association and he responded by posting a winning record with the 1955 Mobile Bears. Washington then selected him in the Rule 5 draft that November.

Grob spent the entire 1956 season with the Senators, appearing in 37 games (36 in relief). He surrendered 121 hits and 14 home runs in only 79 1/3 innings pitched, striking out 27.

At season's end, he was reacquired by Brooklyn and spent the rest of his active career at the top level of the minor leagues with the Dodgers, Milwaukee Braves and Houston Colt .45s. He retired after the 1965 Pacific Coast League season.

Connie Grob died in Madison, Wisconsin, at age 64.
