= Tom Umphlett =

American baseball player (1930–2012)

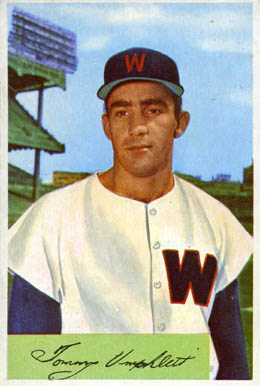
- Outfielder
- Born: May 12, 1930; Scotland Neck, North Carolina, U.S.
- Died: September 21, 2012 (aged 82); Norfolk, Virginia, U.S.
- Batted: Right Threw: Right

MLB debut
- April 16, 1953, for the Boston Red Sox

Last MLB appearance
- September 24, 1955, for the Washington Senators

MLB statistics
- Batting average: .246
- Home runs: 6
- Runs batted in: 111
- Stats at Baseball Reference

Teams
- Boston Red Sox (1953); Washington Senators (1954–1955)

Thomas Mullen Umphlett (May 12, 1930 – September 21, 2012) was an American center and right fielder in Major League Baseball who played from 1953 to 1955 with the Boston Red Sox and Washington Senators. His 21-year professional baseball career as a player and manager lasted from 1950 through 1970. He batted and threw right-handed and was listed as 6 feet 2 inches (1.88 m) tall and 180 pounds (82 kg).

Born in Scotland Neck, North Carolina, the son of Willie L. Umphlett and the former Daisy Mullen, he was a three-sport athlete (baseball, basketball, football) at Ahoskie High School, from which he graduated in 1950. He signed with the Red Sox that year, choosing a professional baseball career over football scholarship offers to several universities. In 1950, with the Marion Red Sox of the Class D Ohio–Indiana League, he hit .319 in 94 games. By 1952, Umphlett was in Triple-A, then he made his big league debut on April 16, 1953, at the age of 22, wearing the number 38. He hit .283 in his rookie season, displaying a sharp eye at the plate: he averaged one strikeout every 16.5 at-bats. He finished second in American League Rookie of the Year Award voting to Harvey Kuenn in 1953.

However, on December 9, Boston included him in a major offseason trade, sending Umphlett and left-handed pitcher Mickey McDermott to the Senators for right fielder Jackie Jensen. The deal was a boon to the Red Sox: Jensen led the American League in runs batted in three times over the next six seasons, made two All-Star teams, and was named his league's Most Valuable Player in 1958. Umphlett struggled at the plate in Washington. He batted only .219 in 114 games played in 1954, then .217 in 110 games in 1955. The Senators traded him back to the Red Sox in November 1955, and Umphlett played for the Bosox' Triple-A affiliates the next seven years. He continued to play in the high minors through June 1967, then became a manager in the Minnesota Twins' organization.

In 360 career MLB games, Umphlett hit .246 with 285 hits — 45 doubles, eight triples and six home runs — in 1,160 at bats). He drove in 111 runs. Umphlett averaged one strikeout every 10.8 at bats in his career. Never much of a threat on the basepaths, Umphlett stole only seven career bases. He had a .986 career fielding percentage. In 1954, he wore number 4. In 1955, he wore 22. According to Baseball-Reference, the player Umphlett is most similar to statistically is Art Kruger.

Umphlett managed the Short Season-Class A Auburn Twins in 1967, then moved up to full-season Class A with the Wisconsin Rapids Twins (part of 1968), Red Springs Twins (all of 1969) and the Lynchburg Twins (part of 1970).

== Major transactions ==
- On December 9, 1953, Umphlett was traded by the Boston Red Sox with Mickey McDermott to the Washington Senators for Jackie Jensen.
- On November 8, 1955, he was traded by the Washington Senators with Bob Porterfield, Johnny Schmitz, and Mickey Vernon to the Boston Red Sox for Karl Olson, Dick Brodowski, Tex Clevenger, Neil Chrisley, and Al Curtis (a minor leaguer).
- On June 12, 1962, Umphlett was traded by the Boston Red Sox, with cash, to the New York Yankees for Billy Gardner.
