= Mel Held =

American baseball player (1929–2024)

- Pitcher
- Born: April 12, 1929; Edon, Ohio, U.S.
- Died: July 20, 2024 (aged 95)
- Batted: Right Threw: Right

MLB debut
- April 27, 1956, for the Baltimore Orioles

Last MLB appearance
- May 13, 1956, for the Baltimore Orioles

MLB statistics
- Win–loss record: 0–0
- Earned run average: 5.14
- Innings pitched: 7

Teams
- Baltimore Orioles (1956)

Melvin Nicholas Held (April 12, 1929 – July 20, 2024) was an American professional baseball player. He appeared in four Major League Baseball games as a relief pitcher for the Baltimore Orioles at the outset of the 1956 season, and had a 13-year career in minor league baseball. He threw and batted right-handed, stood 6 feet 1 inch (1.85 m) tall and weighed 178 pounds (81 kg).

Held, nicknamed "Country", was a nine-year minor league veteran when he pitched for the Orioles in 1956, having signed with the team when it was the St. Louis Browns in 1947. His performance during the 1955 season for the San Antonio Missions of the Class AA Texas League — he posted a 24–7 won-lost record and a 2.87 earned run average — earned him a call-up to Baltimore the following year.

In his first two MLB games, on April 27–28, Held pitched a total of three innings of scoreless relief against the Washington Senators. In his next two appearances, however, in May against the first-division Cleveland Indians and New York Yankees, Held surrendered four earned runs and five hits in four innings. Altogether, Held gave up seven hits in seven innings pitched in MLB, with three walks and four strikeouts. Held was sent back to the minor leagues for good at the May cutdown. His career continued through 1959, and he won 131 minor-league games.

Held died on July 20, 2024, at the age of 95.
