= Jerry Snyder =

American baseball player (1929–2022)

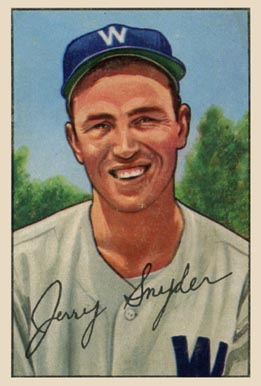
- Shortstop / Second baseman
- Born: July 21, 1929; Jenks, Oklahoma, U.S.
- Died: January 31, 2022 (aged 92); Houston, Texas, U.S.
- Batted: Right Threw: Right

MLB debut
- May 8, 1952, for the Washington Senators

Last MLB appearance
- May 10, 1958, for the Washington Senators

MLB statistics
- Batting average: .230
- Home runs: 3
- Runs batted in: 47
- Stats at Baseball Reference

Teams
- Washington Senators (1952–1958)

Gerald George Snyder (July 21, 1929 – January 31, 2022) was an American infielder in Major League Baseball who played his entire career for the Washington Senators from 1952 to 1958. Listed at 6 feet (1.8 m), 170 pounds (77 kg), he batted and threw right-handed. He was born in Jenks, Oklahoma.

Snyder started his career in 1946 with the Niagara Falls Frontiers of the Class C Middle Atlantic League. Signed by the New York Yankees' scout Tom Greenwade in 1947, he played for their farm teams during five minor league seasons. He was still a member of the Triple-A Kansas City Blues when he was traded to Washington on May 3, 1952, along with Jackie Jensen, Spec Shea and Archie Wilson in the same transaction that brought Irv Noren and Tom Upton to the Yankees.

While in Washington, Snyder provided infield support for Pete Runnels, Herb Plews and Eddie Yost, playing mainly at shortstop. His most productive season came in 1954, when he posted career-numbers in games (64), runs (17) and RBI (17), while hitting .234 (36-for-154). In 1956 he batted a career-high .270 with two home runs and 14 RBI. On July 18, 1955, Snyder participated in five double plays at second base to tie a then major league record. He also played in the Venezuelan league and appeared in the 1959 Caribbean Series.

In a seven-season career, Snyder was a .230 hitter (145-for-630) with three home runs and 47 RBI in 266 games, including 60 runs, 18 doubles, two triples and seven stolen bases. He played 15 professional seasons, through 1961, and spent part of his final campaign as player-manager of the Macon Peaches of the Double-A Southern Association.

Snyder died in Houston, Texas, on January 31, 2022, at the age of 92.

== Sources ==
- Career statistics from Baseball Reference, or Baseball Reference (Minors)
- Retrosheet
