= Chuck Oertel =

American baseball player (1931–2000)

- Outfielder
- Born: March 12, 1931; Coffeyville, Kansas, U.S.
- Died: October 4, 2000 (aged 69); Royal Oak, Michigan, U.S.
- Batted: Left Threw: Right

MLB debut
- September 1, 1958, for the Baltimore Orioles

Last MLB appearance
- September 26, 1958, for the Baltimore Orioles

MLB statistics
- Batting average: .167
- Home runs: 1
- Runs batted in: 1
- Stats at Baseball Reference

Teams
- Baltimore Orioles (1958)

Charles Frank Oertel (March 12, 1931 – October 4, 2000) was an American professional baseball player who appeared in almost 1,200 games in the minor leagues, but only 14 contests in Major League Baseball (MLB) for the Baltimore Orioles in 1958, mostly as a pinch hitter. An outfielder by trade, and a native of Coffeyville, Kansas, he batted left-handed, threw right-handed, and was listed as 5 feet 8 inches (1.73 m) tall and 165 pounds (75 kg).

Oertel spent ten seasons (1950 through 1961, with 1952 and 1953 missed due to Korean War military service) in the same organization. He signed with the then-St. Louis Browns and remained in the club's farm system when it became the Orioles in 1954. He was recalled to Baltimore's expanded, 40-man roster in September 1958 after he batted .313 with 160 hits for the Triple-A Louisville Colonels. In his debut on September 1 against the Washington Senators at Griffith Stadium, he replaced Joe Taylor in right field in the fifth inning. Not batting until the eighth frame, Oertel singled off Hal Griggs in his first MLB plate appearance. He would get only one more hit in the major leagues, but it was a home run against future Hall of Fame pitcher Jim Bunning on September 13.

Of Oertel's 14 games played, nine came as a pinch hitter and three as a pinch runner. He played in two games and ten total innings as an outfielder, but he never started a game. With this two hits in 12 at bats, he hit .167 lifetime; his solo shot off Bunning accounted for his only run batted in. As a baserunner, he tallied four times.

Oertel returned to the minors in 1959 and played the rest of his pro career at Triple-A. He died in Royal Oak, Michigan, at the age of 69.

== Sources ==
- Career statistics from Baseball Reference, or Baseball Reference (Minors)
