= George Zuverink =

American baseball player (1924–2014)

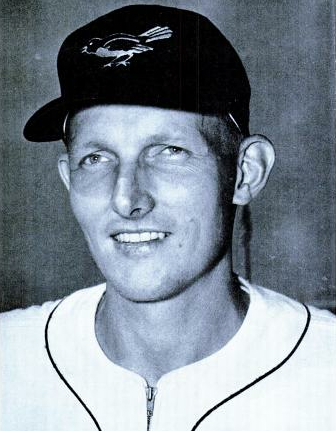
- Pitcher
- Born: August 20, 1924; Holland, Michigan, U.S.
- Died: September 8, 2014 (aged 90); Tempe, Arizona, U.S.
- Batted: Right Threw: Right

MLB debut
- April 21, 1951, for the Cleveland Indians

Last MLB appearance
- June 15, 1959, for the Baltimore Orioles

MLB statistics
- Win–loss record: 32–36
- Earned run average: 3.73
- Strikeouts: 223
- Stats at Baseball Reference

Teams
- Cleveland Indians (1951–1952); Cincinnati Redlegs (1954); Detroit Tigers (1954–1955); Baltimore Orioles (1955–1959)

George Zuverink (August 20, 1924 – September 8, 2014) was a professional baseball player. He was a right-handed pitcher over parts of eight Major League Baseball seasons (1951–1952, 1954–1959) with the Cleveland Indians, Cincinnati Redlegs, Detroit Tigers and Baltimore Orioles. For his career, he compiled a 32–36 record in 265 appearances, mostly as a relief pitcher, with a 3.54 earned run average and 223 strikeouts.

Zuverink died in Tempe, Arizona from pneumonia as a result from a fractured hip he suffered from a fall in May 2014. He was 90 years old.

== See also ==
- List of Major League Baseball annual saves leaders
