= Tex Clevenger =

American baseball player (1932–2019)

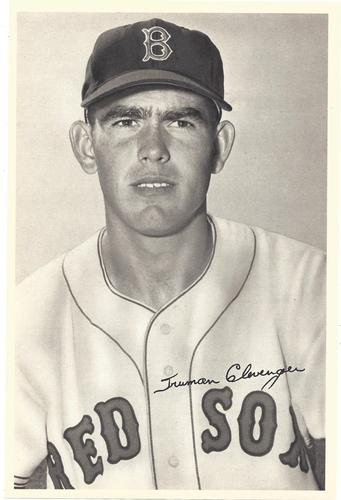
- Pitcher
- Born: July 9, 1932; Visalia, California, U.S.
- Died: August 24, 2019 (aged 87); Porterville, California, U.S.
- Batted: Right Threw: Right

MLB debut
- April 18, 1954, for the Boston Red Sox

Last MLB appearance
- September 30, 1962, for the New York Yankees

MLB statistics
- Win–loss record: 36–37
- Earned run average: 4.18
- Strikeouts: 361
- Stats at Baseball Reference

Teams
- Boston Red Sox (1954); Washington Senators (1956–1960); Los Angeles Angels (1961); New York Yankees (1961–1962)

Career highlights and awards
- 2× World Series champion (1961, 1962)

Truman Eugene "Tex" Clevenger (July 9, 1932 – August 24, 2019) was an American Major League Baseball relief pitcher and spot starter who played for the Boston Red Sox, Washington Senators, Los Angeles Angels and New York Yankees from 1954 to 1962. He was 6 ft 1 in (1.85 m) tall and 180 pounds (82 kg), and threw and batted right-handed. He attended Fresno State University.

== Career ==
Clevenger began his pro career in the Red Sox organization in 1953. In the minors that year, he went 16–2 for the Class C San Jose Red Sox, which was good enough to earn him the 1953 California League MVP Award.

On April 18, 1954, at the age of 21, Clevenger made his MLB debut with the Boston Red Sox. His first season was no more than mediocre, as he went 2–4 with a 4.79 earned run average. Overall in his career, he compiled a 36–37 record with a 4.18 ERA, 298 walks and 361 strikeouts. Oddly enough, perhaps his best season was his last—in 21 games with the American League champion Yankees in 1962, he had an ERA of 2.84 and a record of 2–0. As a hitter, he hit .157, with the highlight of his hitting career being a triple in 1958. He had a .961 career fielding percentage. He did not appear for the Yankees in either the 1961 or 1962 World Series.

== After baseball ==
After leaving baseball, Clevenger worked as an insurance underwriter and owner of a car dealership. In 1987, he was inducted into the Fresno County Athletic Hall of Fame. He was diagnosed with Alzheimer's disease in 2008, and died August 24, 2019.

== Transactions ==
- On November 8, 1955, Clevenger was sent with Al Curtis (a minor leaguer), Dick Brodowski, Neil Chrisley, and Karl Olson from the Red Sox to the Washington Senators for Bob Porterfield, Mickey Vernon, Johnny Schmitz and Tom Umphlett.
- On December 14, 1960, the Los Angeles Angels drafted Clevenger in the expansion draft.
- On May 8, 1961, Clevenger was traded with Bob Cerv by the Angels to the New York Yankees for Ryne Duren, Lee Thomas and Johnny James.
