= Bob Porterfield =

American baseball player (1923–1980)

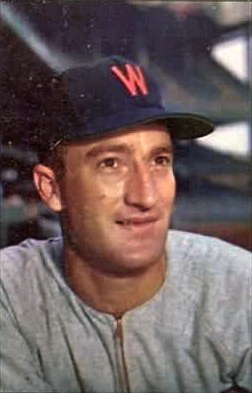
- Porterfield, c. 1953
- Pitcher
- Born: August 10, 1923; Newport, Virginia, U.S.
- Died: April 28, 1980 (aged 56); Charlotte, North Carolina, U.S.
- Batted: Right Threw: Right

MLB debut
- August 8, 1948, for the New York Yankees

Last MLB appearance
- September 9, 1959, for the Pittsburgh Pirates

MLB statistics
- Win–loss record: 87–97
- Earned run average: 3.79
- Strikeouts: 572
- Stats at Baseball Reference

Teams
- New York Yankees (1948–1951); Washington Senators (1951–1955); Boston Red Sox (1956–1958); Pittsburgh Pirates (1958–1959); Chicago Cubs (1959); Pittsburgh Pirates (1959)

Career highlights and awards
- All-Star (1954); AL wins leader (1953)

Erwin Coolidge "Bob" Porterfield (August 10, 1923 – April 28, 1980) was an American right-handed Major League Baseball pitcher. He played for twelve seasons between 1948 and 1959 for the New York Yankees, Washington Senators, Boston Red Sox, Pittsburgh Pirates and Chicago Cubs. Porterfield appeared in one All-Star game in his career.

== New York Yankees ==
Originally signed by the Yankees in 1946, it did not take Porterfield long to reach the Major Leagues. He made his debut on August 8, 1948 at the age of 24. Porterfield showed some promise in his rookie season, going 5–3 with a 4.50 ERA in 78 innings of work. Although he walked 34 and struck out only 30 batters, he threw only one wild pitch in that time. While in the minors in 1948, he led the International League in ERA.

Porterfield spent parts of the next two years with the Yankees, never playing a full season with them. In his time with them, he wore the number 18, except in 1951, when he wore 23.

== Washington Senators ==
On June 15, 1951, Porterfield was sent, with Tom Ferrick and Fred Sanford, to the Senators for Bob Kuzava. In less than three seasons with the Yankees, Kuzava would go 15–19 as a starter/reliever. In contrast, Ferrick went 6–3 with a 2.73 ERA in 49 relief appearances with the Senators. In 1952, Porterfield posted a 13–14 record, albeit with a 2.72 ERA, which was good for seventh in the league.

In 1953, Porterfield led the league with 22 wins and was tenth in the league with a 3.35 ERA. He finished seventh in the league in MVP voting and was named The Sporting News Pitcher of the Year. Porterfield led the league with 24 complete games and nine shutouts and was also involved in a triple play on May 22. He threw two one-hitters in 1953. Oddly, this season was not his lone All-Star season.

Despite his successful year in 1953, Porterfield signed only an $18,000 contract in 1954. Detroit pitcher Ned Garver recalled the effect this had on other pitchers' salaries. "If twenty two wins was worth $18,000 - then what we did was worth a lot less." The 1954 season would be Porterfield's lone All-Star year. He posted a 13–15 record, leading the league in hits allowed with 249. Porterfield did, however, lead the league in complete games with 21. In his appearance in the All-Star Game, he allowed one home run, to Ted Kluszewski.

After three seasons in which he averaged a record of 15–13 and posted a cumulative 3.14 ERA, Porterfield's career quickly spiraled downward. His 10-17 record and 4.45 ERA in 1955 prompted the Senators to trade him (along with Johnny Schmitz, Tom Umphlett, and Mickey Vernon) to the Red Sox for Karl Olson, Dick Brodowski, Tex Clevenger, Neil Chrisley, and Al Curtis (a minor leaguer) on November 8 of that year. While with the Senators, Porterfield wore the number 19, except in 1951, when he wore 29.

== Boston Red Sox ==
Porterfield, in just over two years with the Red Sox, posted a record of seven wins and 16 losses with an ERA of 4.65. After pitching only two games with the Red Sox in the 1958 season, the Pirates purchased him. In Porterfield's time with the Red Sox, he wore number 19, except in 1956, when he wore 16 and 20.

== Pittsburgh Pirates ==
During the 1958 season—in 37 appearances (six starts), he posted a 4–6 record with an ERA of 3.29. He surrendered 78 hits in 87 2/3 innings with the Bucs. Porterfield was involved in a pitching duel with Curt Simmons, earning the victory in a 1–0, 11 inning bout with the Philadelphia Phillies. He was involved in another interesting game in 1958 as well—on July 23, "Dodger Norm Larker hits a ball just inside the 1B line, which the Pirates believe(d) to be foul. When umpire Vic Delmore signal(ed) it fair, P Bob Porterfield pick(ed) up the ball from where it had rolled into the bullpen. Though not playing, Porterfield (was) ejected for intentional interference with a ball in play. Larker (was) safe on 2B. The Dodgers still los(t) 11–3 in the doubleheader opener and are now in last place."

In 1959, Porterfield started off the season with the Pirates, pitching six games with them, posting an ERA of 1.69. Nevertheless, the Pirates released him, and the Cubs picked him up. With them, Porterfield pitched four games, posting an 11.37 ERA. He was then selected off waivers from the Cubs by the Pirates. In 30 relief appearances, Porterfield posted a 4.75 ERA.

Porterfield pitched his final game on September 9, 1959. The final batter he faced was Lee Maye. Porterfield was released two days after the 1959 season ended. In his time with the Pirates, he wore 16 again. With the Cubs, he wore 43. Overall, Porterfield posted an 87–97 career record with a 3.79 ERA and 1,567 2/3 innings of work.

== Career stats ==
Porterfield posted a .184 career batting average. Over 98 at-bats in 1953, he posted a .255 average with three home runs and sixteen RBI. Porterfield's first career home run was a grand slam, which he hit on May 5 of that year. In 1956, he hit .326 in 43 at-bats. Overall, Porterfield hit six home runs in his career, driving in 43 runs. He stole one base in one chance. In the field, Porterfield committed 15 errors for a .960 fielding percentage. He was also involved in 15 double plays in his career.

== Later life ==
After Porterfield's career ended, he became a welder for the Westinghouse Corporation. In 1966, he received one vote for induction into the baseball Hall of Fame, thereby falling well short of the 5% to keep his name on the ballot. Porterfield died in 1980 in Charlotte, North Carolina, from lymphoma, at the age of 56. He is buried in Sharon Memorial Park in Charlotte. In 2005, Porterfield was inducted into the Virginia Sports Hall of Fame.

== See also ==
- List of Major League Baseball annual wins leaders
- List of Major League Baseball annual shutout leaders
- Sporting News Pitcher of the Year Award
