= José Valdivielso =

Cuban baseball player (1934–2025)

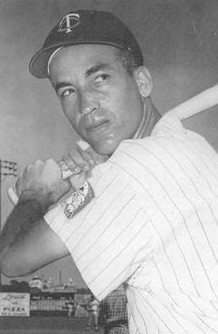
- Shortstop
- Born: May 22, 1934; Matanzas, Cuba
- Died: March 4, 2025 (aged 90); Mount Sinai, New York, U.S.
- Batted: Right Threw: Right

MLB debut
- June 21, 1955, for the Washington Senators

Last MLB appearance
- September 30, 1961, for the Minnesota Twins

MLB statistics
- Batting average: .219
- Home runs: 9
- Runs batted in: 85
- Stats at Baseball Reference

Teams
- Washington Senators / Minnesota Twins (1955–1956, 1959–1961)

José Martinez de Valdivielso (born José Martinez de Valdivielso López, May 22, 1934 – March 4, 2025) was a Cuban-born professional baseball shortstop. He appeared in 401 games over all or part of five seasons in Major League Baseball (MLB), between 1955 and 1961, for the Washington Senators and their later incarnation, the Minnesota Twins. The native of Matanzas threw and batted right-handed; he was listed as 6 feet 1 inch (1.85 m) tall and 175 pounds (79 kg).

== Career ==
In 1960, the team's sixtieth and last season in Washington, Valdivielso was the Senators' most-used shortstop, starting in 92 games and playing a career-high 117 contests. But by late September he had lost his starting job to Zoilo Versalles, a 20-year-old fellow countryman.

Valdivielso's professional career extended through the 1964 season. In total, he collected 213 hits in the majors, with 26 doubles and eight triples to go along with his nine home runs.

== Death ==
Valdivielso died on March 4, 2025, at the age of 90.

== Sources ==
- Career statistics from MLB · Baseball Reference · Baseball Reference (Minors) · Retrosheet · Baseball Almanac
