= Johnny Schmitz =

American baseball player (1920–2011)

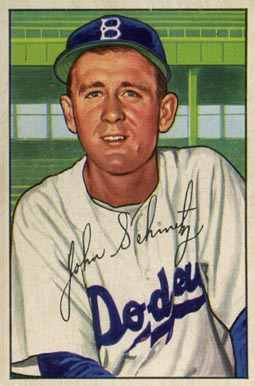
- Pitcher
- Born: November 27, 1920; Wausau, Wisconsin, U.S.
- Died: October 1, 2011 (aged 90); Wausau, Wisconsin, U.S.
- Batted: Right Threw: Left

MLB debut
- September 6, 1941, for the Chicago Cubs

Last MLB appearance
- September 7, 1956, for the Baltimore Orioles

MLB statistics
- Win–loss record: 93–114
- Earned run average: 3.55
- Strikeouts: 746
- Stats at Baseball Reference

Teams
- Chicago Cubs (1941–1942, 1946–1951); Brooklyn Dodgers (1951–1952); New York Yankees (1952); Cincinnati Reds (1952); New York Yankees (1953); Washington Senators (1953–1955); Boston Red Sox (1956); Baltimore Orioles (1956)

Career highlights and awards
- 2× All-Star (1946, 1948); NL strikeout leader (1946)

John Albert Schmitz (November 27, 1920 – October 1, 2011) was an American Major League Baseball pitcher who worked in 366 games over 13 seasons as a member of the Chicago Cubs, Brooklyn Dodgers, New York Yankees, Cincinnati Reds, Washington Senators, Boston Red Sox and the Baltimore Orioles between 1941 and 1956. His career was interrupted from 1943 through 1945 by United States Navy service in the Pacific theatre of World War II.

Schmitz batted right-handed but threw left-handed. His nickname, "Bear Tracks", was inspired by the way he shuffled to the mound and his size 14 feet. Born in Wausau, Wisconsin, he was listed as 6 ft (1.83 m) tall and 170 lb (77 kg).

== Career ==
Originally signed by the Cleveland Indians in 1938, Schmitz was obtained by the Chicago Cubs from the Milwaukee Brewers of the American Association as part of a minor league working agreement. He made his major league debut with the Cubs on September 6, 1941, at the age of 20. He was the fourth-youngest player that year. In his debut, he threw only one pitch.

Schmitz pitched marvelously in the short stint that would be his first major league season: in five games—including three starts—he went 2–0 with a 1.31 earned run average, and one complete game. That season was a foreshadowing of the success he would witness in the next few years of his career.

In 1942, Schmitz posted a solid 3.43 ERA despite a mediocre 3–7 record with the Cubs (who as a team went 68–86 that year). He would end up missing the next three years due to military service, but in 1946 he came back better than ever. An All-Star that year, he posted a 2.61 ERA in 41 games, 31 started. He went 11–11, with 135 strikeouts in 224+ innings pitched, allowing just six home runs in that time. He led the league in strikeouts and was second in hits allowed per nine innings that year (he allowing just 7.38H/9IP). He was fourth in the league in games started, fifth in innings, sixth in ERA and complete games (14) and seventh in game appearances. This performance put him at 30th place in MVP voting that year.

Schmitz' 1947 season was fairly disappointing—he posted a record of 13–18, leading the league in walks. His 3.22 ERA was still good for 10th in the league, as were his 97 strikeouts. His four saves were ninth in the league, and his three shutouts were sixth.

In 1948, Schmitz went 18–13 with a 2.64 ERA. He made the All-Star game for the second time of his career. He was 12th overall in MVP voting, third in the league in wins and complete games (18), fifth in ERA and sixth in games started (30). He also led the league in hits allowed per nine innings, giving up an average of only 6.92.

Schmitz' next two and a half seasons with the Cubs were less than stellar. In that time, he went a combined 23–35, posting a cumulative ERA of 4.80. Still, he finished 23rd in MVP voting in 1949.

It was this subpar performance that prompted a trade by the Cubs to the Brooklyn Dodgers (a team he'd won 18 games against) on June 15, 1951. Schmitz was sent from the Cubs along with Andy Pafko, Wayne Terwilliger and Rube Walker, to the Dodgers for Bruce Edwards, Joe Hatten, Eddie Miksis and Gene Hermanski.

Schmitz never played a full season with the Dodgers. In parts of the 1951 and 1952, Schmitz went 2–5 with a 4.96 ERA in 26 games, 10 of them started. On August 1, 1952, he was selected off waivers from the Dodgers by the New York Yankees. He ended up posting a 3.60 ERA in five games with them before being traded with Jim Greengrass, Bob Marquis and Ernie Nevel to the Cincinnati Reds for Ewell Blackwell. He gave up no runs in five innings of work (in three games total) for the Reds that year. Shoulder and arm problems would result in him playing less and less.

In the 1952/1953 offseason, Schmitz was purchased by the Yankees. He only appeared in three regular season games in 1953 with them before being picked up by the Washington Senators off waivers on May 12. His time with them in 1953 was quite similar to the last few seasons-he posted a 2–7 record.

1954 was quite a career revitalization for Schmitz. In 29 games, 23 of them started, he posted an 11–8 record to complement a 2.91 ERA, which was ninth best in the league. That success did not carry over to 1955, though. He went 7–10 that year with a 3.71 ERA.

In the 1955 offseason, Schmitz was traded by the Senators with Bob Porterfield, Tom Umphlett and Mickey Vernon to the Boston Red Sox for Karl Olson, Dick Brodowski, Tex Clevenger, Neil Chrisley and Al Curtis, a minor leaguer. He ended up appearing in only two games with the Red Sox in 1956 before being purchased by the Baltimore Orioles. He ended his career with them, playing his final game on September 7. He was released by the Orioles on October 18, 1956. Overall, he went 93–114 in his career, posting an ERA of 3.55. He walked 757 batters and struck out 746. He was a poor hitter overall with a .141 career batting average, although he did hit two home runs. As a fielder, he committed 23 errors for a .963 fielding percentage. He was involved in 43 double plays in his career.

Until his death Schmitz lived in Wausau, Wisconsin, and was greens keeper at the American Legion Golf Club Wausau.

== Military service ==
Schmitz missed the end of the 1942 baseball season when he entered the navy. His work as a specialist 3rd class took him to the Pacific Theatre. He was able to play baseball for military teams prior to his deployment.

== Other information ==
- Schmitz wore number 7 in 1941 (one of the rare times in history a pitcher wore a single digit number), 23 in 1942, 53 from 1946 to 1950, 53 and 19 in 1951, 19, 45, and 40 in 1952, 35 and 31 in 1953, 31 in 1954, 20 in 1954 and 1955 and 21 and 40 in 1956.
- It has been determined that Schmitz earned $21,000 in 1949.
- Quote: "Three inches in front of home plate it (Johnny Schmitz's curve ball) was up around your head; the catcher wound up catching it by your feet. He could drop it in a coffee cup." – Rex Barney in "Old Dodgers Were 'Patsies' for Him" (Baseball Digest: September 1996)

== See also ==
- List of Major League Baseball annual strikeout leaders
