= Jerry Dahlke =

American baseball player (1929–2006)

- Pitcher
- Born: June 8, 1929; Marathon, Wisconsin, U.S.
- Died: September 2, 2006 (aged 77); Batesville, Mississippi, U.S.
- Batted: Right Threw: Right

MLB debut
- May 6, 1956, for the Chicago White Sox

Last MLB appearance
- May 20, 1956, for the Chicago White Sox

MLB statistics
- Win–loss record: 0–0
- Earned run average: 19.29
- Strikeouts: 1
- Stats at Baseball Reference

Teams
- Chicago White Sox (1956)

Jerome Alexander Dahlke (June 8, 1929 – September 2, 2006) was an American pitcher in Major League Baseball. He appeared for the Chicago White Sox in 1956 in five games, all in relief.

== Overview ==
Jerry Dahlke made his debut on May 6, 1956. He had an ERA of 19.29.
