= Dick Tettelbach =

American baseball player (1929-1995)

- Outfielder
- Born: June 26, 1929; New Haven, Connecticut, U.S.
- Died: January 26, 1995 (aged 65); East Harwich, Massachusetts, U.S.
- Batted: Right Threw: Right

MLB debut
- September 25, 1955, for the New York Yankees

Last MLB appearance
- May 5, 1957, for the Washington Senators

MLB statistics
- Batting average: .150
- Home runs: 1
- Runs batted in: 10
- Stats at Baseball Reference

Teams
- New York Yankees (1955); Washington Senators (1956–1957)

Richard Morley Tettelbach (June 26, 1929 – January 26, 1995), nicknamed "Tut", was an American professional baseball player who appeared in 29 games in Major League Baseball as an outfielder and pinch hitter for the 1955 New York Yankees and 1956–1957 Washington Senators. Born in New Haven, Connecticut, he attended Yale University, where he played varsity baseball alongside future President George H. W. Bush in 1948. Two years later, Tettelbach captained the 1950 Bulldogs.

Tettelbach threw and batted right-handed and was listed as 6 feet (1.8 m) tall and 195 pounds (88 kg). He signed with the Yankees in 1951 and was called to the majors in September 1955 after the end of his fifth season in the minor leagues. In his MLB debut, Tettelbach appeared in both games of a doubleheader at Fenway Park on September 25 and went hitless in five at bats.

The following February, the Yankees included him in a seven-player trade with Washington that sent left-handed hurler Mickey McDermott to the Bronx. Then, facing the Yankees on April 17 in the traditional "Presidential Opener" at Griffith Stadium, Tettelbach homered off Don Larsen in his first at-bat as a Senator in the presence of Dwight D. Eisenhower, the 32nd President of the United States. The solo shot was one of the few bright spots of a 10–4 Washington defeat.

The blast off Larsen was Tettelbach's lone big-league long ball; he also collected one double and two triples among his 12 hits in 80 at bats and drove in ten runs. On May 15, 1957, at the cutdown date then in effect, Washington traded Tettelbach to the Cleveland Indians. However, when Cleveland assigned him to the San Diego Padres of Pacific Coast League, he chose to retire from the game and remain in Connecticut, where he entered private business and raised his family. He died in East Harwich, Massachusetts, on Cape Cod, at age 65 on January 26, 1995.
