= Neil Chrisley =

American baseball player (1931–2013)

- 1960 Topps Neil Chrisley baseball card #273
- Outfielder
- Born: December 16, 1931; Calhoun Falls, South Carolina, U.S.
- Died: May 18, 2013 (aged 81); Conway, South Carolina, U.S.
- Batted: Left Threw: Right

MLB debut
- April 15, 1957, for the Washington Senators

Last MLB appearance
- September 24, 1961, for the Milwaukee Braves

MLB statistics
- Batting average: .210
- Home runs: 16
- Runs batted in: 64
- Stats at Baseball Reference

Teams
- Washington Senators (1957–1958); Detroit Tigers (1959–1960); Milwaukee Braves (1961)

Barbra O'Neil Chrisley (December 16, 1931 – May 18, 2013) was an American Major League Baseball outfielder who played from 1957 to 1961 with the Washington Senators, Detroit Tigers, and Milwaukee Braves. He was 6 feet 3 inches (1.91 m) tall and weighed 187 pounds (85 kg), batted left-handed and threw right-handed. He was a native of Calhoun Falls, South Carolina, where he graduated from high school. He attended Newberry College.

== Career ==
Chrisley was originally signed by the Boston Red Sox as a free agent in 1950. On November 8, 1955, he was traded with minor leaguer Al Curtis, Dick Brodowski, Tex Clevenger and Karl Olson to the Senators for Mickey Vernon, Bob Porterfield, Johnny Schmitz and Tom Umphlett.

Chrisley started his major league career at the age of 25 on April 15, 1957, against the Baltimore Orioles as a pinch hitter for Camilo Pascual in the 11th inning. He singled off pitcher Billy Loes, but Pedro Ramos pinch ran for him. Chrisley was mostly used as a pinch hitter and bench player throughout his career, which consisted of 302 games, hitting .210 in 619 career at-bats. He hit 16 home runs, walked 55 times and struck out 62 times. Defensively, he only appeared in three games at positions other than an outfielder. In 1958 he was used in one game as a third baseman, and in 1960 he was used in two games as a second baseman. Chrisley played his final game on September 24, 1961. Following the 1961 season he was sold to the newly organized New York Mets, however was returned to the Braves' organization without ever playing for the Mets, although a 1962 Topps baseball card was produced.

== Post career ==
At one point after his retirement from baseball, Chrisley worked as an insurance agent in Greenwood, South Carolina.

== Other information ==
- Chrisley hit 60 home runs in his final three minor league seasons, as well as posted a .343 average with the Indianapolis Indians in 1957.
- He collected his first home run off Bob Turley on May 9, 1958. He hit his final two homers off Johnny Kucks on May 14, 1960.
- His uniform numbers: 20 (1957), 34 (1957), 32 (1958), 24 (1959–1960), 30 (1961)
- Bill Monbouquette pitched a one-hitter against the Tigers in a game in 1960, with the only Tigers hit being a double by Chrisley.

=== Other transactions ===
- On December 6, 1958, he was traded by the Senators with Rocky Bridges and Eddie Yost to the Tigers for Reno Bertoia, Ron Samford and Jim Delsing.
- On December 7, 1960, he was traded by the Tigers with Frank Bolling to the Braves for Bill Bruton, Terry Fox, Dick Brown and Chuck Cottier.
