= Pete Runnels =

American baseball player and manager (1928–1991)

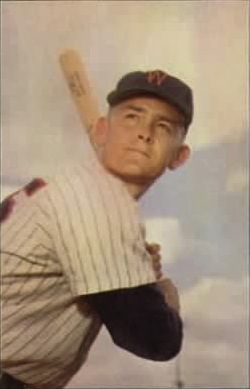
- Runnels c.1953
- Infielder / Manager
- Born: January 28, 1928; Lufkin, Texas, U.S.
- Died: May 20, 1991 (aged 63); Pasadena, Texas, U.S.
- Batted: Left Threw: Right

MLB debut
- July 1, 1951, for the Washington Senators

Last MLB appearance
- May 14, 1964, for the Houston Colt .45s

MLB statistics
- Batting average: .291
- Home runs: 49
- Runs batted in: 630
- Stats at Baseball Reference
- Managerial record at Baseball Reference

Teams
- As player: Washington Senators (1951–1957); Boston Red Sox (1958–1962); Houston Colt .45's (1963–1964); As manager: Boston Red Sox (1966)

Career highlights and awards
- 5× All-Star (1959–1960², 1962²); 2× AL batting champion (1960, 1962); Boston Red Sox Hall of Fame

James Edward "Pete" Runnels (January 28, 1928 – May 20, 1991) was an American professional baseball player, coach and manager. He played in Major League Baseball as an infielder for the Washington Senators (1951–57), Boston Red Sox (1958–62) and Houston Colt .45s (1963–64). Runnels was a five-time All-Star player during his tenure with the Red Sox and, is notable for being a two-time American League batting champion. He was inducted into the Boston Red Sox Hall of Fame in 2004.

== Major League playing and coaching career ==
Born in Lufkin, Texas, the 6 ft (1.8 m), 170 lb (77 kg) Runnels batted left-handed and threw right-handed. A master at handling the bat, he was a notorious singles hitter who had one of the best eyes in the game, compiling an outstanding 1.35 walk-to-strikeout ratio (844-to-627). Altogether, he batted over .300 six times, once with the Senators, five with the Red Sox. Despite winning the batting title in 1960, he drove in just 35 runs, a record low for a batting title winner.

Solid and versatile with the glove, Runnels started as a shortstop with the Senators, but ultimately played 644 games at first base, 642 at second, 463 at shortstop, and 49 at third. Twice he led the American League in fielding percentage, at second base in 1960 (.986), and at first base in 1961 (.995). He was not a good base stealer: in 1952 he set the record for most attempted steals with no successes, at 10. In his career he stole 37 bases and was caught 51 times.

In five seasons with Boston, Runnels never hit less than .314 (1959), winning two batting crowns in 1960 (.320) and 1962 (.326), and just missed the 1958 American League Batting Crown by six points to his teammate Ted Williams on the final day of the 1958 season (.328 to .322). On August 30, 1960, in a double-header against the Tigers, Runnels hit 6-for-7 in the first game (including a game-winning RBI–double in the 15th inning) and 3-for-4 in the second, tying a Major League record for hits in a double-header (9). In 1962, Runnels played in his third All-Star Game for the American League and hit a home run off the Philadelphia Phillies' Art Mahaffey. He went on to win the American League batting title that year. But after the season, Runnels was traded to the Houston Colt .45s (forerunners of the Astros) in exchange for outfielder Román Mejías. Runnels was released by Houston early in the 1964 season.

Runnels was a career .291 hitter (1854-for-6373) with 49 home runs, 630 RBI, 876 runs, 282 doubles, 64 triples, 37 stolen bases, and a .375 on-base percentage in 1799 games. He was selected an All-Star in 1959, 1960 and 1962. He also coached for the Red Sox in 1965–1966, serving as an interim manager for the last 16 games of the 1966 season. Under Runnels, the Sox played .500 baseball and escaped last place by one-half game. However, he was replaced by Dick Williams for the 1967 season.

=== Managerial record ===
Team	Year	Regular season					Postseason			
Team	Year	Games	Won	Lost	Win %	Finish	Won	Lost	Win %	Result
BOS	1966	16	8	8	.500	9th in AL	–	–	–	–
Total		16	8	8	.500		0	0	–	

== Post-baseball life ==
After leaving Major League Baseball, Runnels returned to his native state and opened a sporting goods store in Pasadena, Texas He helped found and operate a co-ed camp, Camp Champions in Marble Falls, Texas, which is still in existence.

After suffering a stroke while golfing on May 17, 1991, Pete Runnels died three days later at Bayshore Hospital in Pasadena, Texas. He was buried at Forest Park East Cemetery in Houston.

== Honors ==
Runnels was inducted into the Texas Sports Hall of Fame in 1982. He was also inducted into the Boston Red Sox Hall of Fame in November 2004.

== See also ==
- List of Major League Baseball batting champions
- List of Major League Baseball single-game hits leaders

Sporting positions
Preceded by Harry Malmberg	Boston Red Sox first-base coach 1965–1966	Succeeded by Bobby Doerr
