= Lou Berberet =

American baseball player (1929–2004)

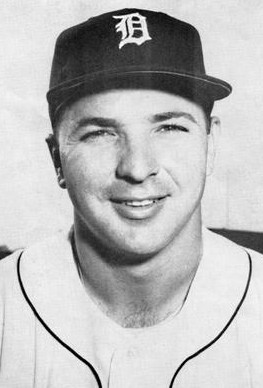
- Berberet in 1959
- Catcher
- Born: November 20, 1929; Long Beach, California, U.S.
- Died: April 6, 2004 (aged 74); Las Vegas, Nevada, U.S.
- Batted: Left Threw: Right

MLB debut
- September 17, 1954, for the New York Yankees

Last MLB appearance
- September 25, 1960, for the Detroit Tigers

MLB statistics
- Batting average: .230
- Home runs: 31
- Runs batted in: 153
- Stats at Baseball Reference

Teams
- New York Yankees (1954–1955); Washington Senators (1956–1958); Boston Red Sox (1958); Detroit Tigers (1959–1960)

Louis Joseph Berberet (November 20, 1929 – April 6, 2004) was an American catcher in Major League Baseball who played for the New York Yankees, Washington Senators, Boston Red Sox and Detroit Tigers between 1954 and 1960. He was born in Long Beach, California.

A stocky player of 5 feet 11 inches (1.80 m), 200 pounds (91 kg), Berberet was a very solid defensive catcher and a decent left-handed hitter. He retired after the 1960 season having a career batting average of .230, with 31 home runs, 153 runs batted in, and a fielding percentage of .992.

Berberet died on April 6, 2004.
