= Mickey McDermott =

American baseball player and coach (1929–2003)

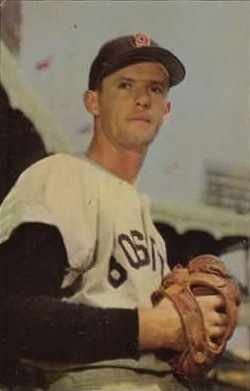
- McDermott c. 1953
- Pitcher
- Born: April 29, 1929; Poughkeepsie, New York, U.S.
- Died: August 7, 2003 (aged 74); Phoenix, Arizona, U.S.
- Batted: Left Threw: Left

MLB debut
- April 24, 1948, for the Boston Red Sox

Last MLB appearance
- August 10, 1961, for the Kansas City Athletics

MLB statistics
- Win–loss record: 69–69
- Earned run average: 3.91
- Strikeouts: 757
- Stats at Baseball Reference

Teams
- Boston Red Sox (1948–1953); Washington Senators (1954–1955); New York Yankees (1956); Kansas City Athletics (1957); Detroit Tigers (1958); St. Louis Cardinals (1961); Kansas City Athletics (1961)

Career highlights and awards
- World Series champion (1956)

Maurice Joseph "Mickey" McDermott Jr. (April 29, 1929 – August 7, 2003) was an American left-handed pitcher in Major League Baseball.

== Pre-professional career ==
Mickey McDermott was the third son of Maurice McDermott Sr., a police officer and former minor league baseball player. Maurice, replaced at first base on the Hartford Senators in the Eastern League by Lou Gehrig, had determined one of his three sons would grow up to be a baseball player and fulfill his dream, though his first-born son, Jimmy, died at the age of seven and his second son, Billy, was born with deformed legs.

McDermott started playing first base, his father's position, until his coach at St. Mary's Grammar School noticed that his ball had a natural curve when thrown. By the time he was playing in the parochial school league for St. Patrick's High, he was averaging twenty strikeouts per game. McDermott played for the semi-pro Ferrara Trucking Company at the age of 13 against adults and some major league baseball players moonlighting to pick up some extra money. He went to his first tryout, also at the age of 13, with the Brooklyn Dodgers.

Mule Haas, a scout for the Dodgers, said that he wanted to sign McDermott, but because of his age it was illegal. At the age of 15, his father changed his birth certificate to make it appear as though Mickey was 18 years old. Joe Cronin, general manager of the Red Sox, did some research and found out McDermott was only 15. Cronin and McDermott's father worked it out so that McDermott's father got a $5,000 signing bonus and two truck loads of Ballantine Beer for McDermott.

== Professional career ==
=== Minor leagues ===
McDermott was assigned to the Red Sox' Double A affiliate, the Scranton Red Sox of the Eastern League. He ended the season with a 16–6 record and a 3.29 ERA, with 136 strikeouts in 175 innings. On July 14, 1946, at the age of 17, McDermott threw a no-hitter against the Albany Senators, making him possibly the youngest pitcher to throw a no-hit game in the high minors.

The following season, McDermott was promoted to Boston's Triple-A affiliate, the Louisville Colonels, where he struggled with his control. Subsequently, he was sent back to Scranton to work on his mechanics. In Scranton, he discovered his form, going 12–4 with four shutouts for the rest of the season, averaging almost one strikeout per inning. During the playoffs, McDermott, threw his second minor league no-hitter. Playing at home against the Utica Blue Sox, McDermott walked Richie Ashburn in the ninth inning. Ashburn took second on a fielders's choice and reached third on a sacrifice fly. With two outs, the catcher called for a curve, but McDermott missed the sign and threw a fastball. The catcher, expecting a curve, failed to catch the ball as it went sailing past him. Ashburn scored the only run of the game to give Utica the victory and McDermott the no-hit loss.

=== Major leagues ===
Norman Rockwell's "The Rookie", a picture based on McDermott making the Red Sox roster. Figuring prominently in the work, right of center, is "the rookie", who was actually Sherman Safford, a high school athlete in Pittsfield, Massachusetts asked to model for the painting.

McDermott made it onto the Red Sox roster for the beginning of the 1948 season, appearing in seven games during the first two months of the season, mostly in lopsided losses. In 23 innings, he had 16 strikeouts and 35 walks, thus was returned to Scranton for more seasoning. After the minor league season ended, he was recalled when the major league roster expanded for the playoff run. While with Scranton, McDermott threw his third career minor league no-hitter.

After 1949 spring training, McDermott was assigned to the Louisville Colonels. On May 24, he struck out 20 St. Paul Saints to set a new American Association record that was never broken (the American Association folded in 1962). Over the next four games after his 20 strikeout performance, he struck out 19, 18, 17 and 19 to set a record for the most strikeouts over a five-game period, 93. Under pressure from sports writers, Boston, which was already eleven games out of first place, brought up McDermott to help their ailing pitching staff.

McDermott got his first big league win after Ellis Kinder left the game in the first inning. McDermott pitched eight innings of shutout baseball before being lifted for a reliever. He finished the season with a 5–4 record and two shutouts.

On May 29, 1952, McDermott faced 27 batters and fired a one-hitter to beat the Washington Senators, 1–0, at Fenway Park. Mel Hoderlein's fourth-inning single was the only Washington hit and he was thrown out while trying to stretch the hit into a double. His finest season came in 1953 when he went 18–10. The following year, he was traded to the Senators for Jackie Jensen. He finished his career with a 69–69 record playing for several different teams. After he refused to sign with the Tigers for the 1959 season, the Tigers sold his contract to the Dallas Eagles of the Texas League, with whom he also refused to sign. Then Bill Veeck, owner of the triple A Miami Marlins of the International League, signed him to pitch on the same staff as Satchel Paige and Virgil Trucks.

While playing winter ball in Cuba in 1959, McDermott's team was at bat when Fidel Castro led the 26th of July Movement that overthrew the regime of Fulgencio Batista. Several people on the field and in the stands were shot, including McDermott's teammate and future Cincinnati Reds shortstop Leo Cárdenas.

McDermott was an excellent hitting pitcher in his 12-year major league career, posting a .252 batting average (156-for-619) with 71 runs, 9 home runs, 74 RBI and 52 bases on balls. He hit .364 for the Red Sox in 1950 and .301 in 1953. He recorded 12 RBI in 1950 and 13 RBI in 1953 and 10 RBI with the Senators in 1955.

Before 1961, Detroit gave McDermott his unconditional release. He signed with the St. Louis Cardinals as a free agent. After divorcing his first wife, McDermott met Linda Biggio, who would become his second wife. After being out late one night, he invited Linda to his room. The hotel detective saw her dressed in a Hawaiian muumuu and said, "You can't bring that hooker into your room!" McDermott punched the detective in the mouth and was subsequently released by the Cardinals.

== Post-playing career ==
As McDermott's baseball career started winding down, he began to drink more. Eventually, he was drinking every night even when he was scheduled to pitch the next day. After pitching in the minor leagues for a while and taking odd jobs to make ends meet, McDermott's second wife, fed up with his alcoholic ways, divorced him. McDermott was hired by the California Angels in 1967 as an assistant pitching coach and batting practice pitcher. He was let go, with the rest of the coaching staff, after the 1968 season. McDermott was eventually hired by Billy Martin, his former teammate, as a scout for the Oakland A's. McDermott turned in the first A's report on Mark McGwire, who eventually signed with them. McDermott was fired, along with the rest of the coaching staff, when Martin was fired after the 1982 season.

McDermott, along with business partner Tino Barzie, started representing baseball players as agents. McDermott would recruit the players, and Barzie would negotiate the contracts. They ended up representing Tony Armas, Mario Guerrero, Alejandro Peña, Candy Maldonado and Marty Barrett. Barzie finally had to end his business relationship with McDermott due to the latter's heavy drinking. McDermott became close friends and drinking companions with Paul Gleason and Jack Kerouac.

In 1991, after getting into a car wreck and being sentenced to 60 days in jail for numerous DWI's, McDermott became sober. He gave up drinking in 1991 when he and his wife won $7 million in the Arizona Lottery. Five years later, his wife, Betty, died of breast cancer. McDermott's health was not much better, as he went on to have a defibrillator and pacemaker surgically installed. He wrote a memoir of his playing (and non-playing) days called A Funny Thing Happened on the Way to Cooperstown, in which he blamed his health problems on his heavy drinking. McDermott lived long enough to see his book published. It was released in April 2003, and he died on August 7, in Phoenix, from congestive heart failure and colon cancer.

== Note ==
1. Mickey McDermott (2003). A Funny Thing Happened On the Way to Cooperstown. Triumph Books. ISBN 978-1-57243-532-2. p. 178
