= Karl Olson =

American baseball player (1930–2010)

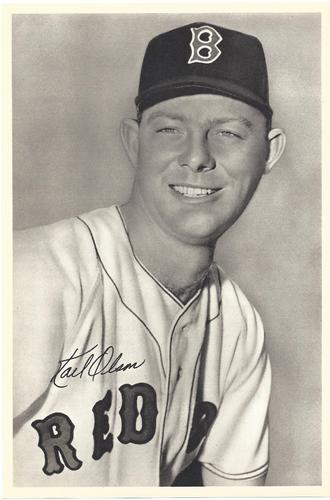
- Outfielder
- Born: July 6, 1930; Ross, California, U.S.
- Died: December 25, 2010 (aged 80); Reno, Nevada, U.S.
- Batted: Right Threw: Right

MLB debut
- June 30, 1951, for the Boston Red Sox

Last MLB appearance
- June 10, 1957, for the Detroit Tigers

MLB statistics
- Batting average: .235
- Home runs: 6
- Runs batted in: 50
- Stats at Baseball Reference

Teams
- Boston Red Sox (1951, 1953–1955); Washington Senators (1956–1957); Detroit Tigers (1957)

Karl Arthur Olson (July 6, 1930 – December 25, 2010) of Kentfield, California, was an American backup outfielder in Major League Baseball who played for the Boston Red Sox (1951, 1953–55), Washington Senators (1956–57) and Detroit Tigers (1957). He batted and threw right-handed, stood 6 feet 3 inches (1.91 m) tall and weighed 205 pounds (93 kg) during his nine-year professional baseball career.

In all or parts of six MLB seasons, Olson was a .235 hitter with 160 hits, 25 doubles, six triples, six home runs and 50 RBI in 279 games played. Olson missed the 1952 season due to service in the Korean War.

Olson was an all-star player for Tamalpais High School in Mill Valley, California, where he graduated in 1948. Boston signed him in June 1948, assigning him to the Triple-A Louisville Colonels in the American Association, which farmed him out to the California League team in San Jose, the San Jose Red Sox.

His minor league career ended with the 1957 season.
