= 1956 Cleveland Indians season =

1956 Cleveland Indians
- League: American League
- Ballpark: Cleveland Municipal Stadium
- City: Cleveland, Ohio
- Owners: Myron H. Wilson, William R. Daley
- General managers: Hank Greenberg
- Managers: Al López
- Television: WEWS-TV (Ken Coleman, Jim Britt)
- Radio: WERE (Jimmy Dudley, Tom Manning)

The 1956 Cleveland Indians season was the 56th season for the franchise, the 42nd as the Indians and the 25th season at Cleveland Stadium. The team failed to upon their 93–61 campaign from the previous season, and missed the playoffs, thus posted an 88–66 record, good for second place and 9 games behind the first place New York Yankees.

== Offseason ==
- October 24, 1955: Ralph Kiner was released by the Indians.
- October 25, 1955: Larry Doby was traded by the Indians to the Chicago White Sox for Chico Carrasquel and Jim Busby.

== Regular season ==
=== Season standings ===
American League
Team	W	L	Pct.	GB	Home	Road
New York Yankees	97	57	.630	—	49‍–‍28	48‍–‍29
Cleveland Indians	88	66	.571	9	46‍–‍31	42‍–‍35
Chicago White Sox	85	69	.552	12	46‍–‍31	39‍–‍38
Boston Red Sox	84	70	.545	13	43‍–‍34	41‍–‍36
Detroit Tigers	82	72	.532	15	37‍–‍40	45‍–‍32
Baltimore Orioles	69	85	.448	28	41‍–‍36	28‍–‍49
Washington Senators	59	95	.383	38	32‍–‍45	27‍–‍50
Kansas City Athletics	52	102	.338	45	22‍–‍55	30‍–‍47

=== Record vs. opponents ===
1956 American League record Sources:
Team	BAL	BOS	CWS	CLE	DET	KCA	NYY	WSH
Baltimore	—	6–16	9–13	5–17	13–9	15–7	9–13	12–10
Boston	16–6	—	14–8	13–9–1	12–10	12–10	8–14	9–13
Chicago	13–9	8–14	—	15–7	13–9	14–8	9–13	13–9
Cleveland	17–5	9–13–1	7–15	—	11–11	17–5	10–12	17–5
Detroit	9–13	10–12	9–13	11–11	—	16–6	12–10	15–7–1
Kansas City	7–15	10–12	8–14	5–17	6–16	—	4–18	12–10
New York	13–9	14–8	13–9	12–10	10–12	18–4	—	17–5
Washington	10–12	13–9	9–13	5–17	7–15–1	10–12	5–17	—

=== Roster ===
1956 Cleveland Indians
Roster
Pitchers: 22,28 Hank Aguirre; 28 Bud Daley; 19 Bob Feller; 25 Mike Garcia; 11 Art Houtteman; 21 Bob Lemon; 26 Sal Maglie; 33,22 Cal McLish; 12 Don Mossi; 20 Ray Narleski; 27 Herb Score; 24 Early Wynn	Catchers: 15 Earl Averill; 15 Hank Foiles; 4 Jim Hegan; 18 Hal Naragon; Infielders: 1 Bobby Ávila; 17 Chico Carrasquel; 8 Kenny Kuhn; 9 Rudy Regalado; 7 Al Rosen; 2 George Strickland; 26 Preston Ward; 23 Vic Wertz	Outfielders: 31 Jim Busby; 33 Joe Caffie; 38 Rocky Colavito; 32 Stu Locklin; 36 Sam Mele; 3 Dale Mitchell; 34 Dave Pope; 16 Al Smith; 14 Gene Woodling; Other batters: 30 Hoot Evers; 5 Bobby Young	Manager: 10 Al López; Coaches: 44 Tony Cuccinello (Third Base); 43 Mel Harder (Pitching); 42 Red Kress (First Base); 40 Bill Lobe (Bullpen)

=== Game log ===
1956 Game Log
April

#	Date	Opponent	Score	Win	Loss	Attendance	Record
1	April 17	@ White Sox	2–1	Pierce (1–0)	Lemon (0–1)	16,773	0–1
2	April 19	@ White Sox	1–0	Harshman (1–0)	Score (0–1)	5,369	0–2
3	April 20	Tigers	3–1	Wynn (1–0)	Garver (0–1)	31,689	1–2
4	April 21	Tigers	7–6	Aber (1–0)	Garcia (0–1)	4,224	1–3
5	April 22	Tigers	6–4	Black (1–0)	Narleski (0–1)		1–4
6	April 22	Tigers	5–2	Lemon (1–1)	Marlowe (0–1)	12,980	2–4
7	April 25	@ Athletics	5–2	Score (1–1)	Shantz (1–1)	18,005	3–4
8	April 26	@ Athletics	14–2	Wynn (2–0)	Kretlow (0–1)	9,014	4–4
9	April 27	@ Tigers	4 – 3 (10)	Mossi (1–0)	Lary (0–2)	3,735	5–4
10	April 29	@ Tigers	1 – 0 (10)	Hoeft (1–0)	Score (1–2)		5–5
11	April 29	@ Tigers	8–4	Lemon (2–1)	Black (1–1)	22,222	6–5

May

#	Date	Opponent	Score	Win	Loss	Attendance	Record
12	May 1	@ Senators	3–2	Wynn (3–0)	Ramos (1–1)	9,639	7–5
13	May 3	@ Orioles	7–1	Garcia (1–1)	Wight (0–4)	12,378	8–5
14	May 4	@ Orioles	4–3	Wilson (3–0)	Score (1–3)	8,130	8–6
15	May 5	@ Orioles	2–1	Lemon (3–1)	Ferrarese (0–1)	9,270	9–6
16	May 7	@ Red Sox	5–1	Brewer (3–1)	Garcia (1–2)	4,396	9–7
17	May 8	@ Yankees	4–3	Kucks (3–1)	Wynn (3–1)	8,794	9–8
18	May 9	@ Yankees	6–5	Score (2–3)	Morgan (0–3)	12,225	10–8
19	May 10	@ Yankees	7–2	Lemon (4–1)	McDermott (1–2)	10,382	11–8
20	May 11	Athletics	4 – 1 (5)	Garcia (2–2)	Kretlow (1–3)	8,622	12–8
21	May 12	Athletics	5–3	Wynn (4–1)	Herriage (0–1)	4,728	13–8
22	May 13	Athletics	5–2	Ditmar (3–2)	Feller (0–1)		13–9
23	May 13	Athletics	9–4	Score (3–3)	Lasorda (0–1)	11,308	14–9
24	May 14	Yankees	3–2	Lemon (5–1)	Kucks (3–2)	18,950	15–9
25	May 16	Yankees	4–1	Morgan (1–3)	Garcia (2–3)	6,263	15–10
26	May 18	Senators	5 – 4 (11)	Stewart (2–0)	Narleski (0–2)	7,747	15–11
27	May 19	Senators	5–1	Score (4–3)	Pascual (2–5)	4,666	16–11
28	May 20	Orioles	6–1	Lemon (6–1)	Wilson (4–2)		17–11
29	May 20	Orioles	5–1	Garcia (3–3)	Palica (2–5)	12,318	18–11
30	May 22	Red Sox	5–3	Brewer (5–1)	Wynn (4–2)	15,286	18–12
31	May 23	Red Sox	6–3	Score (5–3)	Sullivan (3–1)	3,700	19–12
32	May 25	@ White Sox	2–1	Pierce (5–1)	Garcia (3–4)	31,840	19–13
33	May 27	@ White Sox	5 – 4 (15)	Wilson (1–0)	McLish (0–1)	23,857	19–14
34	May 27	@ White Sox	4–2	Wynn (5–2)	Harshman (2–3)	25,856	20–14
35	May 28	Tigers	3–1	Gromek (3–3)	Score (5–4)	9,546	20–15
36	May 30	White Sox	6–3	Pierce (6–3)	Houtteman (0–1)		20–16
37	May 30	White Sox	9–8	Staley (1–0)	Garcia (3–5)	26,788	20–17

June

#	Date	Opponent	Score	Win	Loss	Attendance	Record
38	June 1	@ Senators	5–3	Wiesler (1–2)	Lemon (6–2)	4,738	20–18
39	June 2	@ Senators	15–0	Score (6–4)	Stone (2–1)	2,317	21–18
40	June 3	@ Senators	8 – 4 (12)	McLish (1–1)	Chakales (3–3)		22–18
41	June 3	@ Senators	7–1	Griggs (1–2)	Mossi (1–1)	11,817	22–19
42	June 4	@ Senators	7–0	Garcia (4–5)	Ramos (3–3)	5,021	23–19
43	June 5	@ Orioles	8–3	Lemon (7–2)	Moore (4–4)	25,041	24–19
44	June 6	@ Orioles	5–1	Houtteman (1–1)	Johnson (1–2)	12,363	25–19
45	June 7	@ Orioles	5–2	Wight (3–5)	McLish (1–2)	3,927	25–20
46	June 8	@ Yankees	9–0	Wynn (6–2)	Ford (7–3)	50,812	26–20
47	June 9	@ Yankees	15–8	Daley (1–0)	Morgan (2–5)	31,419	27–20
48	June 10	@ Yankees	6–0	Kucks (7–3)	Lemon (7–3)	47,465	27–21
49	June 11	@ Red Sox	4–1	McLish (2–2)	Porterfield (2–5)	6,330	28–21
50	June 11	@ Red Sox	5–1	Brewer (9–1)	Garcia (4–6)	24,193	28–22
51	June 12	@ Red Sox	9–7	Sullivan (5–3)	Wynn (6–3)	29,190	28–23
52	June 13	@ Red Sox	8–8			8,258	28–23
53	June 14	@ Red Sox	10–9	Delock (2–4)	Lemon (7–4)	7,136	28–24
54	June 15	Yankees	6–2	Kucks (8–3)	Garcia (4–7)	34,025	28–25
55	June 16	Yankees	3–1	Sturdivant (4–1)	Score (6–5)	40,964	28–26
56	June 17	Yankees	9–4	Coleman (2–1)	Wynn (6–4)	41,765	28–27
57	June 19	Red Sox	9–7	Lemon (8–4)	Delock (2–5)	14,684	29–27
58	June 20	Red Sox	5 – 4 (10)	Mossi (2–1)	Hurd (1–3)	14,271	30–27
59	June 21	Red Sox	5–0	Wynn (7–4)	Brewer (9–2)	6,498	31–27
60	June 22	Senators	4–0	Garcia (5–7)	Stobbs (5–5)	9,946	32–27
61	June 23	Senators	9–8	Narleski (1–2)	Ramos (4–6)	4,691	33–27
62	June 24	Senators	7 – 2 (6)	Lemon (9–4)	Wiesler (2–4)	13,072	34–27
63	June 26	Orioles	4–3	Wynn (8–4)	Zuverink (4–3)	8,250	35–27
64	June 27	Orioles	12 – 11 (11)	Mossi (3–1)	Brown (4–1)	4,514	36–27
65	June 29	White Sox	5–2	Score (7–5)	Wilson (10–4)		37–27
66	June 29	White Sox	13–2	Pierce (12–2)	Lemon (9–5)	34,371	37–28
67	June 30	White Sox	8–3	Staley (3–0)	Mossi (3–2)	10,801	37–29

July

#	Date	Opponent	Score	Win	Loss	Attendance	Record
68	July 1	White Sox	7–6	Narleski (2–2)	Consuegra (1–2)		38–29
69	July 1	White Sox	6–1	Lemon (10–5)	Donovan (4–3)	31,857	39–29
70	July 3	Athletics	9–3	Narleski (3–2)	Ditmar (6–9)	6,221	40–29
71	July 4	@ Tigers	6–4	Score (8–5)	Foytack (5–6)		41–29
72	July 4	@ Tigers	3–1	Wynn (9–4)	Maas (0–5)	33,151	42–29
73	July 5	@ Tigers	13–7	Lary (5–10)	Lemon (10–6)	5,270	42–30
74	July 6	@ Athletics	4–2	Garcia (6–7)	Herriage (1–8)	16,171	43–30
75	July 7	@ Athletics	5–2	Ditmar (7–9)	Score (8–6)	16,342	43–31
76	July 8	@ Athletics	17–3	Wynn (10–4)	McMahan (0–3)	15,958	44–31
77	July 12	@ Yankees	9–5	Kucks (12–4)	Lemon (10–7)	24,329	44–32
78	July 13	@ Yankees	10–0	Sturdivant (8–2)	Wynn (10–5)	40,664	44–33
79	July 14	@ Yankees	5 – 4 (10)	Byrne (4–1)	Mossi (3–3)	27,358	44–34
80	July 15	@ Red Sox	10–7	Houtteman (2–1)	Nixon (3–3)		45–34
81	July 15	@ Red Sox	3–1	Sisler (4–3)	Garcia (6–8)	32,290	45–35
82	July 16	@ Red Sox	7–3	Lemon (11–7)	Sullivan (8–4)	14,262	46–35
83	July 18	@ Senators	7–5	Ramos (6–7)	Feller (0–2)		46–36
84	July 18	@ Senators	11–1	Aguirre (1–0)	Pascual (4–11)	8,022	47–36
85	July 19	@ Senators	5–4	Stewart (4–2)	McLish (2–3)	3,178	47–37
86	July 21	@ Orioles	4–3	Lemon (12–7)	Ferrarese (4–7)		48–37
87	July 21	@ Orioles	4 – 3 (10)	Mossi (4–3)	Loes (1–3)	22,986	49–37
88	July 22	@ Orioles	8–0	Wynn (11–5)	Wight (5–8)	10,019	50–37
89	July 24	Senators	11–0	Garcia (7–8)	Stewart (4–3)	9,582	51–37
90	July 25	Senators	11–3	Score (9–6)	Pascual (4–12)	5,099	52–37
91	July 26	Senators	1 – 0 (7)	Lemon (13–7)	Stobbs (7–8)	6,804	53–37
92	July 27	Orioles	3–2	Wynn (12–5)	Schmitz (0–2)	10,063	54–37
93	July 28	Orioles	8–6	Johnson (4–5)	Garcia (7–9)	5,172	54–38
94	July 29	Orioles	3–0	Score (10–6)	Palica (3–9)		55–38
95	July 29	Orioles	4–0	Aguirre (2–0)	Ferrarese (4–8)	13,005	56–38
96	July 30	Yankees	13–6	Ford (14–4)	Lemon (13–8)	22,659	56–39
97	July 31	Yankees	5–0	Wynn (13–5)	Kucks (14–6)	29,619	57–39

August

#	Date	Opponent	Score	Win	Loss	Attendance	Record
98	August 1	Yankees	5–1	Lemon (14–8)	Byrne (6–2)	32,915	58–39
99	August 2	Yankees	4–0	Score (11–6)	Sturdivant (9–5)	25,266	59–39
100	August 3	Red Sox	7–1	Parnell (5–2)	Garcia (7–10)	1,858	59–40
101	August 4	Red Sox	6 – 5 (10)	Delock (9–6)	Garcia (7–11)	13,683	59–41
102	August 5	Red Sox	2 – 1 (7)	Sisler (5–5)	Lemon (14–9)	28,924	59–42
103	August 6	@ Tigers	9–0	Foytack (9–8)	Score (11–7)	29,813	59–43
104	August 7	@ Tigers	5–2	Garcia (8–11)	Lary (10–12)	11,963	60–43
105	August 8	@ White Sox	7 – 6 (14)	Staley (4–1)	McLish (2–4)	26,606	60–44
106	August 9	@ White Sox	9–2	Harshman (9–7)	Wynn (13–6)	9,050	60–45
107	August 10	@ Athletics	11–0	Lemon (15–9)	Burnette (2–4)	13,463	61–45
108	August 11	@ Athletics	8–5	Mossi (5–3)	Crimian (1–6)	13,594	62–45
109	August 12	@ Athletics	6–3	Score (12–7)	Kretlow (4–6)	16,702	63–45
110	August 14	Tigers	6 – 4 (15)	Bunning (3–1)	Mossi (5–4)	14,148	63–46
111	August 15	Tigers	1–0	Lary (12–12)	Lemon (15–10)	11,858	63–47
112	August 16	Tigers	5–4	Score (13–7)	Hoeft (14–10)	7,217	64–47
113	August 17	Athletics	9–3	Crimian (2–6)	Aguirre (2–1)	7,406	64–48
114	August 18	Athletics	8–1	Wynn (14–6)	Kretlow (4–7)	4,355	65–48
115	August 19	Athletics	5–2	Lemon (16–10)	Burnette (2–6)		66–48
116	August 19	Athletics	2–1	Garcia (9–11)	Ditmar (9–16)	10,319	67–48
117	August 21	@ Yankees	3–0	Score (14–7)	Larsen (7–5)	39,187	68–48
118	August 22	@ Yankees	3–2	Sturdivant (12–6)	Wynn (14–7)	23,584	68–49
119	August 23	@ Red Sox	2–1	Parnell (7–3)	Lemon (16–11)	26,439	68–50
120	August 24	@ Red Sox	5–3	Garcia (10–11)	Brewer (16–7)	6,047	69–50
121	August 25	@ Red Sox	9–6	Sisler (6–6)	Score (14–8)	19,830	69–51
122	August 26	@ Senators	4–1	Wynn (15–7)	Stone (4–5)	6,880	70–51
123	August 27	@ Senators	5–2	Lemon (17–11)	Griggs (1–6)	4,879	71–51
124	August 28	@ Orioles	1–0	Moore (11–6)	Aguirre (2–2)	13,673	71–52
125	August 29	@ Orioles	3–2	Mossi (6–4)	Fornieles (3–7)	8,882	72–52
126	August 31	@ White Sox	3–2	Score (15–8)	Pierce (18–7)		73–52
127	August 31	@ White Sox	1 – 0 (10)	Donovan (9–7)	Wynn (15–8)	31,445	73–53

September

#	Date	Opponent	Score	Win	Loss	Attendance	Record
128	September 1	@ White Sox	5–1	Lemon (18–11)	Staley (5–2)	17,749	74–53
129	September 2	@ White Sox	4–3	Harshman (12–9)	Aguirre (2–3)	14,704	74–54
130	September 3	@ Athletics	5–2	Gorman (8–8)	Garcia (10–12)	13,459	74–55
131	September 3	@ Athletics	2–1	Wynn (16–8)	Burnette (3–7)	11,837	75–55
132	September 4	@ Athletics	5–2	Crimian (3–7)	Score (15–9)	7,332	75–56
133	September 7	White Sox	2–1	Harshman (13–9)	Lemon (18–12)	11,202	75–57
134	September 8	White Sox	4–2	Pierce (19–7)	Wynn (16–9)	5,583	75–58
135	September 9	White Sox	4–1	Score (16–9)	Donovan (10–8)		76–58
136	September 9	White Sox	6–2	Staley (6–2)	Aguirre (2–4)	28,457	76–59
137	September 11	Orioles	3–1	Lemon (19–12)	Moore (11–7)	5,427	77–59
138	September 12	Orioles	2–1	Wynn (17–9)	Brown (9–5)	4,738	78–59
139	September 13	Orioles	4–1	Johnson (8–10)	Aguirre (2–5)	1,663	78–60
140	September 14	Red Sox	10–2	Score (17–9)	Parnell (7–5)		79–60
141	September 14	Red Sox	4–3	Sisler (7–7)	Mossi (6–5)	10,000	79–61
142	September 15	Red Sox	5–3	Delock (13–6)	Feller (0–3)	5,242	79–62
143	September 16	Yankees	10–3	Sturdivant (15–8)	Lemon (19–13)		79–63
144	September 16	Yankees	4–3	Wynn (18–9)	Kucks (18–8)	39,651	80–63
145	September 18	Senators	1–0	Score (18–9)	Wiesler (3–12)		81–63
146	September 18	Senators	6–0	Garcia (11–12)	Stobbs (15–13)	4,305	82–63
147	September 19	Senators	6 – 0 (7)	Lemon (20–13)	Abernathy (1–1)	365	83–63
148	September 21	@ Tigers	5–1	Wynn (19–9)	Hoeft (18–13)	19,199	84–63
149	September 22	@ Tigers	5–1	Score (19–9)	Foytack (14–13)	7,738	85–63
150	September 23	@ Tigers	11–1	Lary (20–13)	Lemon (20–14)	13,300	85–64
151	September 25	Athletics	4 – 1 (10)	Wynn (20–9)	Crimian (4–8)	3,604	86–64
152	September 26	Athletics	8–4	Score (20–9)	Ditmar (12–22)	3,630	87–64
153	September 28	Tigers	2–1	Aguirre (3–5)	Hoeft (19–14)	4,528	88–64
154	September 29	Tigers	9–1	Lary (21–13)	Houtteman (2–2)	2,946	88–65
155	September 30	Tigers	8–4	Hoeft (20–14)	Feller (0–4)	5,910	88–66

== Player stats ==
= Indicates team leader

=== Batting ===
==== Starters by position ====
Note: Pos = Position; G = Games played; AB = At bats; R = Runs scored; H = Hits; AVG = Batting average; 2B = Doubles; 3B = Triples; HR = Home runs; RBI = Runs batted in; SB = Stolen bases

Pos	Player	G	AB	R	H	AVG	2B	3B	HR	RBI	SB
C	Jim Hegan	122	315	42	70	.222	15	2	6	34	1
1B	Vic Wertz	136	481	65	127	.264	22	0	32	106	0
2B	Bobby Ávila	138	513	74	115	.224	14	2	10	54	17
3B	Al Rosen	121	416	64	111	.267	18	2	15	61	1
SS	Chico Carrasquel	141	474	60	115	.243	15	1	7	48	0
LF	Gene Woodling	100	317	56	83	.262	17	0	8	38	2
CF	Jim Busby	135	494	72	116	.235	17	3	12	50	8
RF	Rocky Colavito	101	322	55	89	.276	11	4	21	65	0

==== Other batters ====
Note: G = Games played; AB = At bats; R = Runs scored; H = Hits; AVG = Batting average; 2B = Doubles; 3B = Triples; HR = Home runs; RBI = Runs batted in; SB = Stolen bases

Player	G	AB	R	H	AVG	2B	3B	HR	RBI	SB
Al Smith	141	526	87	144	.274	26	5	16	71	6
George Strickland	85	171	22	36	.211	1	2	3	17	0
Preston Ward	87	150	18	38	.253	10	0	6	21	0
Hal Naragon	53	122	11	35	.287	3	1	3	18	0
Sam Mele	57	114	17	29	.254	7	0	4	20	0
Earl Averill	42	93	12	22	.237	6	0	3	14	0
Dave Pope	25	70	6	17	.243	3	1	0	3	0
Rudy Regalado	16	47	4	11	.234	1	0	0	2	0
Joe Caffie	12	38	7	13	.342	0	0	0	1	3
Dale Mitchell	38	30	2	4	.133	0	0	0	6	0
Kenny Kuhn	27	22	7	6	.273	1	0	0	2	0
Stu Locklin	9	6	0	1	.167	0	0	0	0	0
Hoot Evers	3	0	0	0	.---	0	0	0	0	0
Hank Foiles	1	0	0	0	.---	0	0	0	0	0
Bobby Young	1	0	0	0	.---	0	0	0	0	0

=== Pitching ===
= Indicates league leader

==== Starting pitchers ====
Note: G = Games pitched; GS = Games started; IP = Innings pitched; W = Wins; L = Losses; ERA = Earned run average; BB = Walks allowed; K = Strikeouts

Player	G	GS	IP	W	L	ERA	BB	SO
Early Wynn	38	35	277.2	20	9	2.72	91	158
Bob Lemon	39	35	255.1	20	14	3.03	89	94
Herb Score	35	33	249.1	20	9	2.53	129	263
Mike Garcia	35	30	197.2	11	12	3.78	74	119

==== Other pitchers ====
Note: G = Games pitched; GS = Games started; IP = Innings pitched; W = Wins; L = Losses; ERA = Earned run average; BB = Walks allowed; K = Strikeouts

Player	G	GS	IP	W	L	SV	ERA	BB	SO
Hank Aguirre	16	9	65.1	3	5	1	3.72	27	31
Bob Feller	19	4	58.0	0	4	1	4.97	23	18

==== Relief pitchers ====
Note: G = Games pitched; IP = Innings pitched; W = Wins; L = Losses; ERA = Earned run average; BB = Walks allowed; K = Strikeouts

Player	G	IP	W	L	SV	ERA	BB	SO
Don Mossi	48	87.2	6	5	11	3.59	33	59
Cal McLish	37	61.2	2	4	1	4.96	32	27
Ray Narleski	32	59.1	3	2	4	1.52	19	42
Art Houtteman	22	46.2	2	2	1	6.56	31	19
Bud Daley	14	20.1	1	0	0	6.20	14	13
Sal Maglie	2	5.0	0	0	0	3.60	2	2

== Award winners ==
All-Star Game

== Farm system ==
Level	Team	League	Manager
AAA	Indianapolis Indians	American Association	Kerby Farrell
AA	Mobile Bears	Southern Association	Jo-Jo White
A	Reading Indians	Eastern League	Don Heffner
B	Fayetteville Highlanders	Carolina League	L. D. Meyer
B	Keokuk Kernels	Illinois–Indiana–Iowa League	Pinky May
C	Fargo-Moorhead Twins	Northern League	Tom Oliver
D	Daytona Beach Islanders	Florida State League	Hank Majeski
D	Vidalia Indians	Georgia State League	Mark Wylie
D	North Platte Indians	Nebraska State League	Spencer Harris

LEAGUE CHAMPIONS: Indianapolis, Fayetteville

In 1956, the Indianapolis Indians were 92–62. On May 18, they defeated the Louisville Colonels by a score of 24–0. Roger Maris had seven runs batted in for the game. The Indians went on to win the 1956 Junior World Series by defeating the Rochester Red Wings. In Game 2 of the Junior World Series, Maris would set a record by getting seven runs batted in.
