= Héctor López =

Panamanian baseball player (1929–2022)

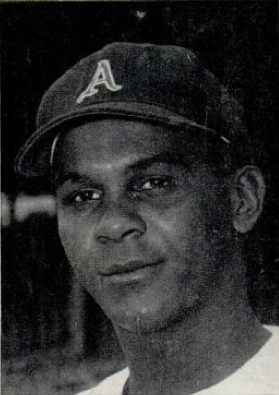
- López in 1955
- Outfielder / Third baseman
- Born: July 8, 1929; Colón, Panama
- Died: September 29, 2022 (aged 93); Hudson, Florida, U.S.
- Batted: Right Threw: Right

MLB debut
- May 12, 1955, for the Kansas City Athletics

Last MLB appearance
- September 30, 1966, for the New York Yankees

MLB statistics
- Batting average: .269
- Home runs: 136
- Runs batted in: 591
- Stats at Baseball Reference

Teams
- Kansas City Athletics (1955–1959); New York Yankees (1959–1966)

Career highlights and awards
- 2× World Series champion (1961, 1962)

Héctor Headley López Swainson (July 8, 1929 – September 29, 2022) was a Panamanian professional baseball left fielder and third baseman who played in Major League Baseball for the Kansas City Athletics and New York Yankees from 1955 to 1966. He won two World Series with Yankees in 1961 and 1962. He later became the first black manager at the Triple-A baseball level.

López was the second Panamanian-born major league baseball player and continued to be one of the country's most revered world champion athletes. Although Humberto Robinson debuted in the major leagues 22 days earlier than López, López was the first major leaguer born in Panama to have an extensive career.

Lopez was a reliable hitter but a questionable fielder. He was an infielder for the Athletics, and later was often the third outfielder on the Roger Maris/Mickey Mantle Yankees of the early and mid-1960s. López had his most successful season in 1959, but continued to contribute effectively during the early 1960s during their pennant successes. The utility player divided his career almost equally between infield and outfield positions. After retiring from baseball, he went on to become a groundbreaking manager in minor league baseball as the first to break the baseball color line as a black manager at the Triple-A level for the Buffalo Bisons and then served in various international managerial and coaching positions.

== Early life ==
Born in Colón, Panama, on July 8, 1929, López grew up in Colón near the Panama Canal Zone. His father had been a baseball pitcher for the Panama national team. López held a part-time job at an American military base bowling alley and was a high school track star. As a high school athlete, he played semi-professional baseball for US$100 per month in Colón. After he graduated from high school, he signed to play with the St. Hyacinthe Saints of the Class-C Provincial League along with Clifford "Connie" Johnson.

== Kansas City Athletics (1955–1959) ==
Prior to the 1952 season, López was acquired by the Philadelphia Athletics from the Drummondville Cubs of the Provincial League for $1,500 ($18,186 today). In 1954, López won baseball's Triple Crown in the Winter League. Throughout his professional career, he played in the Panama winter league where he won three batting titles and regularly led the league in home runs. López developed in the A's farm system, and when the team relocated to Kansas City in 1955 he was called up to the major league club. López made his major league debut in 1955. That season he finished second to Carlos Paula among rookies in batting average and was beaten out by American League strikeout-leading pitcher Herb Score for the Rookie of the Year. He usually played second or third base during his time with the Athletics. During his rookie season, he finished third on the team in home runs, trailing only Gus Zernial (30) and Vic Power (19). He tied Jim Finigan for third on the team in runs batted in (RBIs) with 68, trailing only Zernial and Power, who had 84 and 76, respectively. López was the team's regular third baseman, and was the youngest regular starter on the team. In 1956, the team finished with a 52–102 record, but López had a career-high 153 hits. He also set then-career highs in home runs (18) and runs batted in (69). In his early years, black and white players did not room together on the road, so he roomed with Vic Power even though Power's closest friend on the team was Clete Boyer. In 1957, he had a 22-game hitting streak, which is the all-time Kansas City Athletics team record for the thirteen seasons the franchise played there.

López finished in the top-10 in the American League in both games played and at bats in the 1956 and 1958 seasons, and led the league in sacrifice flies and times grounded into double plays in 1958. López also was in the top 10 in doubles and runs scored in 1958 and in sacrifice hits in 1956. On June 26, 1958, López hit three home runs in a game against the Washington Senators. During his career with the Athletics, he hit .278 with 67 home runs and 269 RBIs, and scored 298 runs. However, his talents were wasted on a team that never finished above sixth place. On May 26, 1959, he was traded with Ralph Terry to the New York Yankees for Johnny Kucks, Tom Sturdivant, and Jerry Lumpe. For all his offensive skills, López led American League third basemen in errors in each of his four full seasons in Kansas City.

Baseball writer and Kansas City Athletics fan Bill James wrote that López was as bad a defensive player as you would ever want to see. The authors of The Great American Baseball Card Flipping, Trading and Bubble Gum Book declared López "the all-time worst fielding major league ballplayer".

== New York Yankees (1959–1966) ==
In his first season with the Yankees after being traded, he played 35 games in the outfield, the first time in his career he played more than 20 outfield games. He still played 76 games at third base for the team. In his 33 games with Kansas City at the start of the 1959 Major League Baseball season, he had played exclusively at second base. In his next five seasons with the Yankees from 1960 to 1964, he mostly played in the outfield as he was part of five consecutive pennant winners. During his time with the Yankees, he was often the third outfielder alongside Roger Maris and Mickey Mantle, known as the M&M Boys, as part of the Yankees that won two of the five consecutive World Series they played in from 1960 to 1964. López is one of eleven Yankees to have been on these five consecutive pennant winners along with Whitey Ford, Elston Howard, Bobby Richardson, and Clete Boyer and is one of seven Yankees to have been part of the entire Maris/Mantle Yankee era. In 1965 and 1966, he made the majority of his outfield appearances in right field. However, in 1965 Mantle did not play center field. Mantle did return to center field for the majority of his appearances in 1966 (the final year of the Maris/Mantle Yankees and the final year of López' career).

In 1959, he finished in the top 10 in slugging percentage, hits, doubles, and RBIs. In 1960 he was among the top 10 in triples and sacrifice hits. During the 1961 World Series, López replaced Mantle (who only had six Series at bats) in Game 4 and recorded a 2-run single on the way to a 7–0 victory. In Game 5, which was the Series-clinching game, he homered and tripled, driving in five runs, and caught Vada Pinson's fly ball for the final out of the Series. His three for nine, 7 run batted in performance continues to be remembered by New Yorkers as a highlight of the series.

== Career statistics ==
In 1,450 games over 12 seasons, López posted a .269 batting average (1,251-for-4,644) with 623 runs, 193 doubles, 37 triples, 136 home runs, 591 RBIs, 418 bases on balls, .330 on-base percentage, and .415 slugging percentage. He finished his career with a collective .954 fielding percentage playing primarily at left and right field and second and third base. In 15 World Series games, he hit .286 (8-for-28) with four runs scored, two doubles, one triple, one home run, seven RBIs, and two walks.

== Managing career ==
In 1967, López played for the Washington Senators' Triple-A Pacific Coast League affiliate Hawaii Islanders. The following season when the Buffalo Bisons of the International League became Washington's Triple-A affiliate, López joined the Bisons as a player. He then became their manager in 1969. This made him the first black manager at the Triple-A level. This was six years before Frank Robinson became the first black manager in the major leagues. López was one of three black men (along with Sam Bankhead and Gene Baker) to manage in the minor leagues in the twenty-five years after Jackie Robinson broke the color barrier in 1947. In 1990, he coached the baseball team for Malverne High School in Malverne, New York, in Nassau County on Long Island in addition to working in the parks department in the Town of Hempstead. López also managed in Venezuela and been a player-manager in Panama.

In 1994 and 1995, López managed the Gulf Coast League Yankees, the rookie-league team. López managed the Panama national baseball team in the 2009 World Baseball Classic.

== Personal life ==
After his retirement, López participated in Yankees Old Timers Day for around 50 years. López and his wife, Claudette Joyce (née Brown), married in 1960. They had two sons. López died on September 29, 2022, in Hudson, Florida, from complications of lung cancer. He was 93.

== See also ==
- List of players from Panama in Major League Baseball

== Sources ==
- Moffi, Larry; Jonathan Kronstadt (1994). Crossing the Line: Black Major Leaguers, 1947–1959. University of Iowa Press. pp. 136–138. ISBN 9780877455295.
