= Tom Sturdivant =

American baseball player (1930–2009)

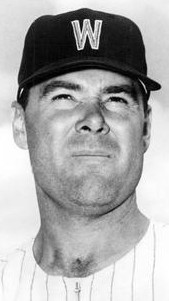
- Pitcher
- Born: April 28, 1930; Gordon, Kansas, U.S.
- Died: February 28, 2009 (aged 78); Oklahoma City, Oklahoma, U.S.
- Batted: Left Threw: Right

MLB debut
- April 14, 1955, for the New York Yankees

Last MLB appearance
- June 21, 1964, for the New York Mets

MLB statistics
- Win–loss record: 59–51
- Earned run average: 3.74
- Strikeouts: 704
- Stats at Baseball Reference

Teams
- New York Yankees (1955–1959); Kansas City Athletics (1959); Boston Red Sox (1960); Washington Senators (1961); Pittsburgh Pirates (1961–1963); Detroit Tigers (1963); Kansas City Athletics (1963–1964); New York Mets (1964)

Career highlights and awards
- 2× World Series champion (1956, 1958)

Thomas Virgil Sturdivant (April 28, 1930 – February 28, 2009), nicknamed "Snake", was an American professional baseball pitcher. He played in Major League Baseball (MLB) for the New York Yankees, Kansas City Athletics, Boston Red Sox, Washington Senators, Pittsburgh Pirates, Detroit Tigers, and New York Mets. He threw a curveball and a knuckleball, among other pitches. He batted left-handed but threw right-handed.

Sturdivant was originally signed by the Yankees as an infielder in 1948. After a two-year stint in the United States Army, he became a pitcher in order to improve his chances of making the major leagues. He debuted with the Yankees in 1955, the first of four straight years he was on a World Series roster. In 1956, he had a 16–8 record, led the American League (AL) with a 2.12 strikeout-to-walk ratio, and won Game 4 of the 1956 World Series, which the Yankees won in seven games over the Brooklyn Dodgers. He went 16–6 in 1957, tying for the AL lead in winning percentage with a .727 mark. Arm trouble and a spike wound to the heel limited him in 1958, though he won his second World Series as the Yankees defeated the Milwaukee Braves in seven games.

The next several years saw Sturdivant pitch for a number of teams. He was traded to the Athletics in May 1959. In 1960, he made the Opening Day start for the Red Sox, but he only started two more games for them. The Senators picked him in the 1960 expansion draft, then traded him to the Pirates in mid-1961. Pittsburgh initially assigned him to the minor leagues, but he won five games in a six start stretch shortly after being recalled. He split 1962 between the starting rotation and the bullpen, winning four straight games in late August/early September. In 1963, he pitched for Pittsburgh, Detroit, and Kansas City, winning just twice as he spent most of the year in the bullpen. He pitched in three games for Kansas City in 1964, then pitched in 16 games for the Mets that same year before getting released on June 27. Following his baseball career, he was involved in trucking businesses around Oklahoma City.

== Early life ==
Born in Gordon, Kansas, on April 28, 1930, Tom was the son of Elbert E. Pete Sturdivant and his wife, Ethel (née Moudy). He was the second of two boys; brother Bobby Joe was born in 1926. The family had moved to Oklahoma City, Oklahoma, by 1940. Elbert worked for an oil pipeline company as a telegraph operator while Ethel worked at a fur repair shop as an assistant.

Sturdivant attended Capitol Hill High School in Oklahoma City, which he graduated from in May 1948. He played as a pitcher for Bill Mosier's Tires, an American Legion team, but he also played infield positions. While he was in high school, John Hall, a neighbor of his, taught him how to throw a knuckleball. On May 24, 1948, he was signed as an infielder by New York Yankees scout Tom Greenwade, the man who became famous the next year for signing Sturdivant's fellow Oklahoman Mickey Mantle. "What a boy if we can find a position for him," Greenwade said in 1949. "Great speed and a rifle arm. Used to be a high-school pitcher in Oklahoma City, you know. And one of the greatest. He set some kind of record. More than 100 innings without being scored on. When he wasn’t pitching he was playing short. He likes to play the infield. He might, with that arm and speed, make a real outfielder."

== Minor league career ==
=== Third baseman (1948–50) ===
Sturdivant began his professional career playing third base for the Quincy Gems of the Three-I League, which was at the Class B level. He batted .338 in 21 games. Later in the season, he batted .241 in 36 games for the Norfolk Tars, another Yankees' Class B affiliate in the Piedmont League which needed help at third base. He spent the next two seasons at Quincy, hitting.255 in 109 games in 1949. He only played 68 games in 1950, batting .246, but he also pitched in two contests. During his time at Quincy, he suffered a leg injury that reduced his speed.

=== United States Army (1951–52) ===
Sturdivant joined several other Yankee prospects at a pre-spring training camp held by Yankee manager Casey Stengel, but he played no professional baseball that season. With the Korean War going on, Sturdivant joined the United States Army for two years of service. During his time in the Army, he decided that he would focus on pitching when he resumed his professional career. "I knew I wasn't getting anywhere, batting .246 in Class B, so I decided I'd better try something else if I wanted to stay in baseball, which I did, badly."

=== Pitcher (1953–54) ===
Discharged from the Army, Sturdivant was able to join the Beaumont Exporters of the Texas League of the Class AA level for the remainder of their 1952 season. Harry Craft, the manager, supported him in his decision to become a pitcher and assigned him as roommate Hank Wyse, a former Major League Baseball (MLB) player with the Chicago Cubs who mentored Sturdivant in the art of pitching. Sturdivant was 3–3 with a 3.56 ERA in 17 games (seven starts. In 1953, he had a 10–7 record with a 2.98 ERA for the Class AA Birmingham Barons of the Southern Association, striking out 104, walking 61, and allowing 130 hits in 139 innings pitched. Of his 47 appearances for Birmingham, just three were starts. In 1954, he started 20 of his 32 appearances with the Kansas City Blues of the American Association, a Class AAA level team that was New York's top minor league affiliate. With the Blues, he was 8–9 with a 3.57 ERA, 133 strikeouts, 59 walks, and 154 hits allowed in 169 innings.

== Major league career ==
=== New York Yankees (1955–59) ===
Coming into the 1955 season, fellow Oklahoman and Yankee pitcher Allie Reynolds, who had given Sturdivant pitching tips, thought the prospect might make New York's roster in 1955 as a relief pitcher. During spring training, Stengel said, "I’m very impressed with his work. He has improved considerably since training started. … We learned that he can be a fighter … and that’s what we want with this club." Sturdivant did make the roster, working almost exclusively out of the bullpen during the 1955 season. He wore the number 47, which he bore throughout his time with the team. His major league debut, against the Boston Red Sox on April 14, could have been better. Entering to begin the bottom of the seventh with New York losing 5–2, Sturdivant gave up a triple to opposing pitcher Willard Nixon, who later scored on a double by Faye Throneberry. Then, in the eighth, he allowed two more runs, which scored on a double by Boston reliever Ellis Kinder. The Yankees lost 8–4. On May 22, he was the pitcher getting the hits when he singled against the Baltimore Orioles in the second game of a doubleheader that New York trailed 3–2. Yogi Berra hit a home run to score him, and Sturdivant picked up his first major league win in the victory. It was his only win of the season.

Sturdivant made only one start in 1955. Facing the Kansas City Athletics on July 22, he gave up two runs in seven innings but was outdueled on the mound by ex-Yankee Vic Raschi in the 3–1 loss. In 33 games, he had a 1–3 record, a 3.16 ERA, 48 strikeouts, 42 walks, and 48 hits allowed in 68 1/3 innings. He was part of the Yankees' roster as they faced the Brooklyn Dodgers in the 1955 World Series. In Game 3, he gave up two runs and four hits, pitching the final two innings of an 8–3 loss. He pitched a scoreless eighth inning in Game 4, but the Yankees lost that one 8–5. Those were his only appearances of the series, which the Dodgers won in seven games. After the season, he and the Yankees went on a tour of Japan, playing exhibition games against Japanese teams.

In 1956, the Yankees wanted to waive Sturdivant and send him to the minor leagues, but a claim by the Detroit Tigers prevented them from doing so. He did not make an appearance until the 25th game of the season on May 13; though he was originally scheduled to start a game on May 5, Stengel pushed back his debut because he wanted a more experienced pitcher on the mound following some Yankee losses. His first appearance was a start, but most of his outings in the early part of the year were in relief. On June 16, he got a start against the Cleveland Indians, striking out 11, allowing just two hits and one run, and earning an ovation from the fans at Cleveland Stadium in a 3–1 victory. On July 13, Sturdivant threw his first major league shutout, holding the Indians to two hits in a 10–0 victory. After that game, except for a stretch between August 2 and August 18, he was used mainly as a starter. He struck out seven Indians in a 3–2 victory on August 22, then recorded eight strikeouts in the first game of a doubleheader against the Tigers four days later, when he threw his second shutout of the season in a 7–0 victory. Sportswriter Joseph M. Sheehan reported, "During the Bombers' drive to the pennant, [Sturdivant] carried an equal share of the pitching load with Whitey Ford and Johnny Kucks, the Yankees' two nineteen-game winners." By the end of the year, Stengel said, "He was a meal ticket...starting and relieving and doing both good in the tough spots...now he's got the experience, too, to go along with the rest of it." In 32 games (17 starts), he had a 16–8 record, 110 strikeouts, and 52 walks in 158 1/3 innings. His 16 wins ranked 10th in the American League (AL), his 3.30 ERA ranked eighth, and his .667 winning percentage was tied for seventh (with Kucks and Frank Sullivan. He led the AL in Strikeout-to-walk ratio with a 2.12 mark.

For the second year in a row, Sturdivant and the Yankees faced the Dodgers in the World Series. Called on in relief in the third inning of Game 2, with the score tied 6–6, he allowed an RBI single to Don Bessent and left with the bases loaded, though Tom Morgan retired Pee Wee Reese on a pop fly to end the inning with no more runs scoring. The Yankees lost that game 13–8, though Sturdivant did not get the loss. With the Dodgers up 2–1 in the series, he pitched a complete Game 4. Seven times, the leadoff man for the Dodgers reached, drawing visits to the mound from Stengel in the later innings, but the manager elected to use his starter for the full distance. The Yankees defeated the Dodgers 6–2, one day before Don Larsen's perfect game. "Yogi called ’em and I threw ’em," Sturdivant credited his catcher for help handling the Dodgers. With Ford, Larsen, Bob Turley, and Kucks, Sturdivant was part of a group that threw five straight complete games in the series, an occurrence that has yet to be repeated. This time, the Yankees were victors in seven games.

Sturdivant's 1957 regular season was even better than it had been in 1956. This year, all 28 of his appearances were starts. From April 26 through May 24, he pitched 31 consecutive innings without allowing an earned run. Included in that stretch were a game on May 15 in which he struck out nine Indians (though he suffered the loss because of two unearned runs) sandwiched between victories over the Athletics on May 7 and May 24, the latter of which was a shutout. Against the Tigers on June 9, after Frank Bolling and Charlie Maxwell started the third inning with back-to-back home runs, Sturdivant threw a pitch over Ray Boone's head. Boone started for the mound, and Sturdivant approached him as the benches cleared; both players were thrown out of the game. Sturdivant claimed the pitch was a mistake: "It was a high fast one that got away from me." A loss on August 7 brought his record to 9–6, but he won all seven of his final decisions, posting a 1.59 ERA in his last nine games. In the first game of an August 18 doubleheader, he shut out the Orioles, striking out eight in a 7–0 victory. Six days later, he tied his season high with nine strikeouts against the Indians; though he gave up four runs over eight innings, he earned the win in the 10–4 victory. He threw eight shutout innings in a 2–0 win over the Orioles on September 3. In 1957, Sturdivant walked 80 batters and allowed 170 hits in 201 2/3 innings pitched, a career high. His 16–6 record helped him lead the AL in won-lost percentage (.727, tied with Dick Donovan, who was also 16–6), and his 2.54 ERA was second in the league to teammate Bobby Shantz's 2.45. Sturdivant also finished third in the AL in wins (tied with Donovan and Tom Brewer behind Jim Bunning's and Billy Pierce's 20). Sports Illustrated said he was the "most dependable Yankee pitcher."

The Yankees again reached the World Series, this time facing the Milwaukee Braves. Starting Game 4, Sturdivant pitched three scoreless innings before allowing four runs in the fourth, including home runs by Hank Aaron and Frank Torre. He received a no decision, but the Yankees lost in 10 innings. He pitched a scoreless sixth and seventh innings in Game 7, but the Yankees already trailed, and they were defeated 5–0 as Milwaukee won the series.

Hoping for a higher salary, Sturdivant waited to start spring training, finally agreeing to an $18,000 contract (a $4,000 increase) in late February. He did not pitch between April 22 and May 28, and on June 5, Sheehan reported that "Sturdivant has yet this year to find his touch." Bearing a 1–4 record and a 6.00 ERA through June 12, he was relegated to the bullpen, not starting again until July 20. In August, he suffered an injury during practice when one of his teammates stepped on his heel, spiking him and causing an injury that placed him on the disabled list for six weeks. The Boston Globe reported that Stengel fined the pitcher $250 for horseplay. However, Stengel said in an August 19 article, "The accident happened because Tom slipped on the damp grass. No one was clowning around." Arm trouble suffered that year began a "nightmarish" few seasons for him. He had a "miserable" season, according to Sports Illustrated. In 15 games (10 starts), he had a 3–6 record, a 4.20 ERA, 41 strikeouts, 38 walks, and 77 hits allowed in 70 2/3 innings pitched. Though Sturdivant was initially left off the list of World Series-eligible players, Stengel announced on the final day of the season that Sturdivant was indeed one of the 25. He did not pitch in the series but earned his second World Series ring as New York prevailed in seven games.

Sturdivant started spring training late in 1959 as he negotiated his contract, finally agreeing to the same salary as the previous year. The Yankees, who had discussed trading him to the Washington Senators for Camilo Pascual in 1956, were rumored to be interested in making the same trade in 1959, until Sturdivant threw five shutout innings in a spring game on March 23. In seven games (three starts) with the Yankees during the regular season, he had an 0–2 record, a 4.97 ERA, 16 strikeouts, nine walks, and 20 hits allowed in 25 1/3 innings. On May 26, he, along with Kucks and Jerry Lumpe, was sent to Kansas City for Héctor López and Ralph Terry. Though he and Kucks had been viewed as up-and-coming stars in 1957, Stengel said, "The two pitchers, Kucks and Sturdivant, just couldn’t get going for me, and I felt we had to do something. Maybe a change of scenery will do them good."

=== Kansas City Athletics (1959) and Boston Red Sox (1960) ===
With the Athletics, Sturdivant wore uniform number 32. He was used mainly as a reliever, making only three starts. On July 17, he relieved Bud Daley with no outs in the sixth after the starter had given up three runs to narrow a 4–0 lead over the Orioles to 4–3. Sturdivant did not allow a hit, pitching four scoreless innings to preserve the win. Against the Tigers on September 23, with Kansas City down 5–1 and the bases loaded, Sturdivant relieved Al Grunwald and struck out Gus Zernial to end the inning. He then pitched two scoreless innings and earned the win after Kansas City rallied in the sixth. Those were, however, his only wins for Kansas City. In 36 games, he had a 2–6 record, a 4.65 ERA, 57 strikeouts, 34 walks, and 70 hits allowed in 71 2/3 innings pitched. Adding in his totals from his seven games with New York, he had a 2–8 record, a 4.73 ERA, 73 strikeouts, 43 walks, and 90 hits allowed in 97 innings pitched. On December 3, he was traded by the Athletics to the Red Sox for Pete Daley.

Sturdivant wore uniform number 15 for the Red Sox. Boston planned on using Sturdivant as a starter, according to manager Billy Jurges: "His trouble is that his arm is weak. He has to start all over again and strengthen it. I’ve talked to a lot of the men in the league who liked what they saw of him late last season." The Red Sox liked what they saw of him too, as he was the best-conditioned player at the start of spring training. By the end of it, he had been selected to make the Opening Day start against the Senators, a game traditionally held the day before the rest of the AL teams started their season. While Pascual allowed just three hits, Sturdivant gave up six runs (five earned) in four innings, taking the loss. After allowing three runs in five innings in another loss to Washington (not charged to him), he held the Senators to one run and four hits over seven innings on April 30, though he again received a no decision, this time in a 2–1 victory. However, he was used out of the bullpen for the rest of the season, often as a long reliever. Pitching in the 12th inning of a tie game against the White Sox on June 25, he threw a wild pitch with Joe Ginsberg on third base, allowing the runner to score the winning run in a 7–6 defeat. Twice (June 21 and August 6), he had relief outings of seven innings or more; he allowed five earned runs both times but recorded the victory on August 6 in an 11–9 win over the Tigers. In 40 games for Boston, he had a 3–3 record, a 4.97 ERA, 67 strikeouts, 45 walks, and 106 hits allowed in 101 1/3 innings pitched.

=== Washington Senators (1961) and Pittsburgh Pirates (1961–63) ===
On December 14, 1960, he was drafted by the new Washington Senators from the Red Sox in the 1960 expansion draft. He wore uniform numbers 35 and 47 during his tenure with Washington. After two relief appearances, he began to be used as a starter on April 26, holding the Red Sox to three hits and one unearned run over 7 1/3 innings and picking up the win in a 2–1 triumph. He won the first shutout game in Senators history, a 4–0 victory over Boston on May 13. The only hit he allowed in the game was a double to Vic Wertz, the only baserunner for Boston. Those were his only wins with Washington, however, and after he gave up seven runs in 3 1/3 innings of a 14–9 loss to Boston on June 16, he was moved to the bullpen. In 15 games (10 starts) through June 29, he had a 2–6 record, a 4.61 ERA, 39 strikeouts, 40 walks, and 67 hits allowed in 80 innings pitched. On that date, he was traded by the Senators to the Pittsburgh Pirates for Tom Cheney.

Sturdivant did not pitch for Pittsburgh right away, as the major league club sold his contract to the Columbus Jets, their Class AAA affiliate in the International League. He gave Columbus manager Larry Shepard credit for helping improve his performance: "One thing he noticed was that I seemed to be flinging or flipping the ball, instead of firing it. Maybe because I’d been hit so hard in the American League I was timid about throwing strikes. But Shepard put me right to work. He threw me in there every fourth game, my arm got stronger, and my confidence returned. I started throwing more knuckleballs for strikes and I started winning." In six starts for Columbus, he had a 5–1 record and a 1.80 ERA, striking out 26, walking eight, and allowing 34 hits in 45 innings before getting his contract purchased by Pittsburgh on July 29. He replaced George Witt on Pittsburgh's roster. With Pittsburgh, Sturidvant wore uniform number 15. After losing his first start for the Pirates, he threw six consecutive complete games, winning all but an 11–inning match against the Cubs on August 18 in which he allowed two runs in 10 1/3 innings. On August 25, facing the Cubs again, Sturdivant made one run hold up, throwing a shutout in Pittsburgh's 1–0 victory. His ERA in those starts was 1.63. In a four-hit victory over the Reds on August 30, he retired 20 hitters in a row. However, Sturdivant did not win again after September 5, posting a 4.28 ERA in his final six games (four starts) of the season. In 13 games (11 starts) for the Pirates, he had a 5–2 record, a 2.84 ERA, 45 strikeouts, 17 walks, and 81 hits allowed in 85 2/3 innings pitched. His combined totals in 28 games (21 starts) between Washington and Pittsburgh were a 7–8 record, a 3.69 ERA, 84 strikeouts, 57 walks, and 148 hits allowed in 165 2/3 innings pitched.

Beginning his 1962 season on April 13, Sturdivant struck out seven and allowed two runs over seven innings, earning the win in a 4–3 triumph over the New York Mets. After giving up five earned runs in only an inning of work in his next two starts, he was moved to the bullpen. In the second of those two, on April 23, he had become the first pitcher to lose to the Mets, who had lost the first nine ballgames of their existence. He had a 6.41 ERA through June 18, but he lowered over a full run by posting a 2.86 mark from June 24 through August 11. Added back to the rotation on August 18, he won four straight starts. He had back-to-back eight-strikeout games August 18 and August 22, the latter of which was a three-hit shutout of the Houston Colt .45's. Though he went 1–2 in his final four starts, he pitched at least seven innings and allowed no more than three runs in any of them. "My knuckleball just won’t act right till late in the season," he said. In 49 games (12 starts), he had a 9–5 record, a 3.73 ERA, 76 strikeouts, 39 walks, and 120 hits allowed in 125 1/3 innings pitched.

In its preview of the 1963 Pirates, Sports Illustrated wrote that "Harvey Haddix and knuckle-balling Tom Sturdivant are getting old and will spend some time in the bullpen with fork-baller ElRoy Face." He gave up six runs in 8 1/3 innings as a reliever and requested a trade. "I asked the Pirates to trade me because I get nervous when I don’t pitch."

=== Detroit Tigers (1963), Kansas City Athletics (1963–64), and New York Mets (1964) ===
On May 4, 1963, his contract was purchased by the Tigers. With Detroit, he was assigned uniform number 22. The Tiger team Sturdivant joined was in last place in the AL. He won his first game with Detroit, relieving Phil Regan with two outs and the Tigers up by one in the fifth inning of a game against the Orioles, stranding the two runners he inherited, and pitching scoreless ball the rest of the way in Detroit's 12–4 victory on May 5. That was his only win with the team. His longest outing came in the second game of a doubleheader against the Senators on May 18, when he relieved Jim Bunning after Bunning had walked the first two batters of the game. Sturdivant lasted five innings but surrendered six runs, taking the loss in the 7–5 defeat. In 28 games (all in relief) for the Tigers, he had a 1–2 record, a 3.76 ERA, 36 strikeouts, 24 walks, and 43 hits allowed in 55 innings pitched. On July 23, his contract was purchased by the Athletics.

With Kansas City, Sturdivant replaced Dale Willis, who was sent to the minor leagues to create space for him on the roster. He wore uniform number 18 for the Athletics this time. In late August and early September, he made three starts for the Athletics, never allowing more than three earned runs but posting an 0–1 record, though Kansas City won the first of the trio. With Kansas City losing 6–5 to Boston on September 25, Sturdivant relieved Ed Rakow in the sixth inning, then held the Red Sox to one run for the rest of the game, earning the win in a 7–6 triumph. In 17 games (three starts) for Kansas City, he had a 1–2 record, a 3.74 ERA, 26 strikeouts, 17 walks, and 47 hits allowed in 53 innings pitched. He appeared in 48 games (three starts) for his three teams in 1963, posting a 2–4 record, a 3.95 ERA, 68 strikeouts, 45 walks, and 98 hits allowed in 116 1/3 innings pitched.

Sturdivant began 1964 with Kansas City, posting a 9.82 ERA in three appearances. He was released by the Athletics on May 10.

Later on May 10, Sturdivant signed as a free agent with the Mets later that day. He wore uniform number 47, his old Yankees number, for the Mets; and he was reunited with Stengel, now managing the National League (NL) ballclub. As was the case with Kansas City, he was used exclusively in relief. On June 21, he pitched in both games of a doubleheader against the Philadelphia Phillies. Two days later, he was placed on waivers, and the Mets released him on June 27. In 16 games for New York, he had no record, a 5.97 ERA, 18 strikeouts, seven walks, and 34 hits allowed in 28 2/3 innings pitched. Adding in the Kansas City totals, he had a 6.40 ERA, 19 strikeouts, eight walks, and 38 hits allowed in 32 1/3 innings pitched.

On July 5, 1964, Sturdivant signed with his hometown Oklahoma City 89ers, the Class AAA affiliate of the Colt .45's. Bill Nowlin of the Society for American Baseball Research speculates that he may have done so partly to help his political campaign, as he was running as a Republican for the Oklahoma Senate that fall. In 13 games (12 starts) for the 89ers, he had a 6–3 record, a 3.89 ERA, 35 strikeouts, 14 walks, and 87 hits allowed in 74 innings pitched. Sturdivant said he would retire from baseball if elected, but he failed to win the Senate seat. However, 1964 was his final professional season.

== Pitching style ==
Sturdivant's curveball was difficult to face, earning him the nickname "Snake". In its preview of the Yankees before the 1956 World Series, Sports Illustrated wrote, "Has good fast ball that moves, tailing away from right-hand batter and highly effective knuckler. A real battler." The fastball was a sinkerball, according to the 1955 Sports Illustrated preview of the Yankees before the World Series. Steve Boros described his first major league at bat, which was against Sturdivant in 1957: "I took a curve and a slider, both of which looked rather ordinary. Then he threw me a knuckle ball. I must have lunged at the pitch three times and just did foul it back. I'd never seen anything like that in the Big Ten. I finally popped up on a high inside fast ball. I remember trotting back to the dugout wondering what I had gotten myself into." Sturdivant began incorporating the knuckleball into his repertoire around 1956; the pitch helped him emerge as a starter that year. The Associated Press called the knuckleball his best pitch in 1963. Before he threw a pitch, he had a habit of "banging the ball, again and again into his glove," according to teammate Sal Maglie. Ted Williams said of him in 1956, "Maybe he hasn’t got a thing. But I notice one thing. He keeps winning."

== Post-retirement career ==
After his retirement from baseball, he was involved in the freight and truck leasing business. He worked for R&R Trucking, Inc., then served as an executive for Rollins Trucking Company. According to his wife, Elaine, "He worked for two or three companies and then we started our own company, King Truck Leasing. It was really hard work. I worked there a while, but for someone as high-strung as Tom, it maybe wasn’t best for husband and wife to work together." He later served on the board of directors of Metro Tech in Oklahoma City and the Integris Hospice of Oklahoma County.

== Personal life ==
On May 9, 1952, Tom married Paula Whitten, who went by her middle name, Reba. They had two sons, Thomas Virgil ("Tommy") II and Paul Marshall. The couple eventually divorced, and Tom remarried to Elaine in 1980. His son, Tom III acted in The Young Riders, though he spent most of his life working in sales. By the end of 2006, both Paul and Tommy had died. In the 2000s, Sturdivant and his wife attended Grace Community Baptist Church, a Southern Baptist church founded and pastored by Don Demeter, who was also a former MLB player.

During his time with the Yankees, Sturdivant played golf with Mantle. The two were golfing together late in the 1957 season, when Mantle suffered a massive gash in his shin after frustratedly throwing a putter and had to miss five games. Sturdivant remained a Yankee fan after his career ended, subscribing to a television package that allowed him to watch all the games, even in the Midwest. In 1976, he organized an Allie Reynolds Appreciation Day in Oklahoma to help the former pitcher's Hall of Fame chances. Sturdivant participated in baseball fantasy camps.

Just before 2000, Sturdivant's pickup truck rolled over five times while he was visiting Texas. He was hospitalized for a few weeks and underwent two surgeries, but the accident affected his health permanently. On Valentine's Day in 2009, his wife woke up to find him on the floor, having suffered a seizure. He never regained consciousness and died on February 28 at Integris Southwest Medical Center in Oklahoma City.

== Bibliography ==
- Forker, Dom. Sweet Seasons: Recollections of the 1955–64 New York Yankees. Dallas, Texas: Taylor Publishing Co., 1990.
