= Charlie Maxwell =

American baseball player (1927–2024)

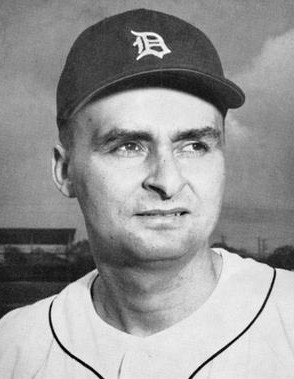
- Maxwell with Detroit, c. 1959
- Left fielder
- Born: April 8, 1927; Lawton, Michigan, U.S.
- Died: December 27, 2024 (aged 97); Paw Paw, Michigan, U.S.
- Batted: Left Threw: Left

MLB debut
- September 20, 1950, for the Boston Red Sox

Last MLB appearance
- April 26, 1964, for the Chicago White Sox

MLB statistics
- Batting average: .264
- Home runs: 148
- Runs batted in: 532
- Stats at Baseball Reference

Teams
- Boston Red Sox (1950–1952, 1954); Baltimore Orioles (1955); Detroit Tigers (1955–1962); Chicago White Sox (1962–1964)

Career highlights and awards
- 2× All-Star (1956, 1957)

Charles Richard Maxwell (April 8, 1927 – December 27, 2024), sometimes known as "Sunday Charlie", "the Sabbath Slugger", and "Ol' Paw Paw", was an American left-handed professional baseball left fielder. A native of Michigan, he played 14 seasons in Major League Baseball (MLB) with the Boston Red Sox (1950–52, 1954), Baltimore Orioles (1955), Detroit Tigers (1955–62), and Chicago White Sox (1962–64).

Maxwell was selected to the American League All-Star team in 1956 and 1957. In 1956, he finished among the American League (AL) leaders with a .534 slugging percentage (third in the AL behind Mickey Mantle and Ted Williams); a .326 batting average (fourth in AL behind Mantle, Williams, and Detroit teammate Harvey Kuenn); a .414 on-base percentage (fourth in the AL); and 96 runs (fourth in the AL). He led all American League outfielders in fielding percentage in 1957 (.997) and 1960 (.996), committing only one error in each year. He also finished among the top five home run hitters in the American League in 1956 (28) and 1959 (31).

For his 14 years in the major leagues, Maxwell compiled a .264 batting average, a .360 on-base percentage, and a .451 slugging percentage with 148 home runs, 484 walks, and 532 RBIs. He appeared in 1,133 games, including 781 in left field, 56 in right field, and 43 at first base. He posted a .988 career fielding percentage. He was inducted into the Michigan Sports Hall of Fame in 1997.

== Early years ==
Maxwell was born in 1927 in Lawton, Michigan. He grew up on his father Tom Maxwell's grape farm in Lawton, tilling his own asparagus patch at age 12. His mother worked at the local Welch's grape juice plant.

Maxwell learned to play baseball in an open field with stones to mark the bases. He attended Lawton High School where he played both baseball and basketball. He then attended Western Michigan College of Education (now known as Western Michigan University), playing college baseball as a pitcher in 1945. He struck out 15 batters in a game against Central Michigan in June 1945.

At the end of his freshman year at Western Michigan, Maxwell was inducted into the United States Army, serving as a sergeant in the infantry. He spent most of his time in army camps in the Southern United States. After his military service, Maxwell played amateur baseball for the Kalamazoo Bears.

== Professional baseball ==
=== Minor leagues (1947–1950) ===
Before making his major-league debut, Maxwell spent several years in the Boston Red Sox farm system. He began the 1947 season as a pitching prospect for the Class-B Roanoke Red Sox, but he was sent early in the season to the Class-D Wellsville Red Sox of the PONY League. At Wellsville, Maxwell was converted into an outfielder. After a month with the club, Wellsville manager Tom Carey told Maxwell "your control's pretty bad, kid, but you hit a long ball. How about trying the outfield?" He ended the 1947 season with a .354 batting average (highest in the PONY League for players with at least 300 at bats), a .455 on-base percentage, 52 bases on balls, 17 home runs and 79 RBIs in 92 games.

In 1948, Maxwell returned to Roanoke. He started fast at Roanoke, but injuries hampered his performance, and he ended the 1948 season with a .294 batting average with 12 home runs.

Maxwell began the 1949 season with the Single-A Scranton Miners of the Eastern League, but he was optioned back to Roanoke in early May. On his return to Roanoke, Maxwell won the Piedmont League Triple crown with a .345 batting average, 29 home runs, and 112 RBIs. He also led the league with 164 hits and 297 total bases. On May 25, 1949, Maxwell capped a comeback from a 13–4 deficit with a two-out, three-run homer in the ninth inning.

Maxwell spent most of the 1950 season with the Double-A Birmingham Barons of the Southern Association. He compiled a .320 batting average (.422 on-base percentage, .604 slugging) with 25 home runs in 192 games during the regular season. He hit four additional home runs in the playoffs for Birmingham, giving him a total of 29 home runs during his time with the Barons.

=== Boston and Louisville (1950–1955) ===
Maxwell was called up to Boston for the last week of the 1950 season. He made his major league debut on September 20, 1950, appeared in three games, and went hitless with a walk in nine plate appearances. With Ted Williams ensconced as Boston's left fielder, Maxwell saw limited action for the Red Sox. One account noted: "Maxwell became Ted's caddy, playing the odd innings and games when Williams was taking a rest, and making occasional appearances as a pinch hitter."

Maxwell's batting average in 1951 was .188 (15 hits in 80 at bats). Three of his 15 hits in 1951 were pinch hit home runs off Bob Feller, Bob Lemon, and Satchel Paige. In the second half of the 1951 season, Maxwell was sent to the Double-A Louisville Colonels, batting .255 in 40 games.

In March 1952, Maxwell was optioned back to Louisville. He compiled a .272 batting average with 21 home runs and 85 RBIs for the Colonels in 1952. He also drew a career-high 102 walks for a .410 on-base percentage. He also played in eight games for Boston in June 1952, tallying only one hit in 15 at bats.

In February 1953, Maxwell was again returned on option to Louisville. He played the full 1953 season for the Colonels, compiling a .305 batting average, .405 on-base percentage, 93 walks, 23 home runs and 107 RBIs. At the end of the 1953 season, Maxwell was named to the American Association All-Star team.

Maxwell's strong performance in Louisville and Ted Williams' broken collarbone gave Maxwell additional playing time at the start of the 1954 season. In mid-May, Williams returned to the lineup, and Maxwell returned to a backup role. Maxwell appeared in 74 games for the Red Sox in 1954, 12 as a starter in left field, but his batting average remained underwhelming at .250.

=== Baltimore (1955) ===
In the off-season, the Red Sox sold Maxwell to the Baltimore Orioles as the final piece of a deal that sent Sam Mele to the Red Sox. Maxwell appeared in only four games for the Orioles, tallying four pinch-hit at-bats without a hit.

=== Detroit Tigers ===
==== Peak years (1955–1960) ====
On May 9, 1955, Maxwell was acquired from Baltimore by the Detroit Tigers for the waiver price of $10,000. During the 1955 season, he was the Tigers' backup left fielder behind Jim Delsing. Maxwell appeared in 55 games for the 1955 Tigers, 23 of them as the team's starting left fielder.

Early in the 1956 season, Maxwell took over Delsing's spot as the Tigers' starting right fielder. In his first season as an every-day player in the major leagues, Maxwell appeared in 141 games (130 as a starter in left field) and won a spot on the 1956 American League All-Star team. During the 1956 season, Maxwell finished among the American League (AL) leaders in most batting categories with a .534 slugging percentage (third in the AL behind Mickey Mantle and Ted Williams); a .326 batting average (fourth in AL behind Mantle, Williams, and Detroit teammate Harvey Kuenn); a .414 on-base percentage (fourth in the AL); 96 runs (fourth in the AL); 28 home runs (5th in the AL); and 87 RBIs (fifth in the AL). Maxwell also excelled in the field in 1956, with a .987 fielding percentage. His 28 home runs in 1956 was a Detroit single-season record (later broken) for left-handed batters. On October 4, 1956, Maxwell's hometown of Paw Paw observed Charlie Maxwell Day with a banquet in his honor, a parade, and presentation of a key to the city.

In 1957, Maxwell was named to the American League All-Star team for the second straight year. Having committed only four errors in 1956, Maxwell improved his performance in 1957, committing only one error in over 300 chances. He led all American League outfielders with a .997 fielding percentage, and his 2.36 Range factor was 0.39 points above the average for all outfielders. Maxwell also continued his strong hitting in 1957. Though his batting average dipped by 50 points to .276, he finished with a .377 on-base percentage (eighth best in the AL) and 24 home runs (seventh in the AL). "I was a tougher clutch hitter late in the game," Maxwell recalled. "Sportswriter Hal Middlesworth told me that I led the team in game-winning hits in 1956 and 1957, even though other guys hit for higher averages."

After a decline in Maxwell's performance in 1958 (13 home runs and 65 RBIs), the Tigers acquired veteran Larry Doby to replace Maxwell for the 1959 season, but Doby posted a .218 batting average in 18 games and was traded on May 13, leaving the left field spot open for Maxwell to reclaim. Maxwell posted career-highs in 1959 with 31 home runs (fourth in the AL) and 95 RBIs (fifth in the AL).

In 1960, Maxwell's batting average dropped to .237, though he still hit 24 home runs and tallied 84 RBIs. Five of Maxwell's 24 home runs in 1960 came in extra innings, making him the first player in major league history with five extra-inning home runs in a season. (Nelson Cruz later tied Maxwell's record in 2010.) Maxwell's defensive performance remained strong in 1960, as he led all American League outfielders in fielding percentage for the second time in his career. He committed only one error in over 1,000 innings in left field, for a .996 fielding percentage.

==== "Sunday Charlie" ====
Maxwell became known as "Sunday Charlie", sometimes the "Sabbath Slugger", due to his propensity for hitting home runs on Sundays. The nickname was bestowed in 1959 when Maxwell hit 12 of his 31 home runs (38.7%) on Sundays. The peak of Maxwell's Sunday slugging success came on May 3, 1959, in a doubleheader sweep of the New York Yankees, before a crowd of 43,438. After missing 10 days with a broken finger, Maxwell returned to the lineup and hit four home runs in consecutive at bats: a solo home run into the upper deck of right field against Don Larsen in the seventh inning of the first game; a two-run shot against Duke Maas in the first inning of the second game; a 400-foot three-run shot off the facing of the centerfield bleachers against Johnny Kucks in the fourth inning of the second game; and a 415-foot solo home run into the lower centerfield bleachers against Zach Monroe in the seventh inning of the second game. After Maxwell's fourth shot, the crowd reaction was described as "pandemonium." He joined Ted Williams Bill Nicholson, Hank Greenberg, Jimmy Foxx, and Lou Gehrig as the only modern major leaguers to hit home runs in four consecutive official at bats.

Over the course of his career, Maxwell hit 40 of his 148 home runs (27%) on Sundays. When asked how he was able to hit so many home runs on Sundays, Maxwell replied, "I don't know how but I sure wish I could find out so I could do it on the other days of the week."

Maxwell was also given the nicknames "Ol' Paw Paw" (owing to Maxwell's home town) and "Sunday Punch" by the Detroit Tigers announcer Van Patrick. He was also sometimes known as "The People's Choice" due to his friendliness with fans and his pregame entertaining of busloads of kids (known as the Knothole Gang) seated in the leftfield stands on Saturdays, including "catch[ing] fly balls behind his back, or between his legs, and then toss[ing] them to the youngsters."

==== Pinch hitter and backup (1961–1962) ====
In 1961, Rocky Colavito took over Maxwell's spot in left field. Colavito hit 45 home runs and 140 RBIs, and Maxwell was relegated principally to a pinch hitting role. During the early weeks of the 1962 season, Maxwell compiled a .194 batting average in 30 games.

=== Chicago White Sox (1962–1964) ===
On June 25, 1962, the Tigers traded Maxwell to the Chicago White Sox. Maxwell had a late season revival with the White Sox in 1962. By the third week of August, Maxwell was batting .352 for Chicago, and had a 13-game hitting streak, the team's longest that year. Maxwell wound up hitting .296 for the White Sox in 1962 with nine home runs. Maxwell also continued his "Sunday Charlie" tendencies with the White Sox, hitting five of his nine home runs in 1962 on Sundays, including three home runs during a Sunday doubleheader in July.

In 1963, Maxwell appeared in 71 games for the White Sox, 23 as a starter in left field, 12 as a starter at first base, and the rest as a pinch hitter. His batting average dropped by 65 points from the prior year to .231, though his ability to draw walks (31 in 1963) boosted his on-base percentage to .370.

In 1964, Maxwell had only two plate appearances both as a pinch hitter. He went hitless in those appearances. He appeared in his final game at age 37 on April 26, 1964, and was placed on waivers on May 11, 1964.

Maxwell was offered a job by the White Sox as a minor-league hitting instructor, but declined, opting instead to return to his home in Paw Paw, Michigan. His 10-year-old son, Jeff, was about to undergo surgery, and he noted: "It took about three days to decide I had enough. I never knew how much fun it was to stay around the house in the summer. We went fishing and swimming and went on picnics."

=== Career statistics ===
In a 14-season major-league career, Maxwell tallied a .264 batting average, a .360 on-base percentage, and a .451 slugging percentage with 148 home runs, 484 walks, and 532 RBIs in 1,133 games. He appeared in 1,133 games, including 781 in left field, 56 in right field, and 43 at first base. He posted a .988 career fielding percentage.

== Family and later years ==
Maxwell was married in June 1950 to Ann Fulcher of Roanoke, Virginia. They were married for over 70 years and had four children: Charles Richard Jr. (born c. 1951), Jeffrey (born c. 1954), Cindy (born c. 1956), and Kelle (born c. 1967). Maxwell lived for many years on Maple Lake in Paw Paw, Michigan. He noted in 1981 that he "enjoys Maple Lake. We have a paddleboat and speedboat that we use on the lake."

After his playing career ended in 1964, Maxwell was hired in September 1964 as a salesman for Cal-Die Casting Co. of Kalamazoo. He later worked as a sales representative for Hayes-Albion Corp. and Paramount Diecasting, companies that supplied parts to automobile manufacturers.

In 1997, Maxwell was inducted into the Michigan Sports Hall of Fame.

The Village of Paw Paw Historical Commission sponsored "Charlie Maxwell Days" on August 7 and 8, 2010. The event included a display of memorabilia from Maxwell's playing career, the dedication of a two-sided monument stone honoring Maxwell, a public reception where the public could meet Maxwell, a parade following the dedication ceremony, and the renaming of the local baseball field as "Charlie Maxwell Field." Maxwell also served as the honorary manager of the Paw Paw Corkers for an 1860s style baseball game against the House of David Echoes.

The Paw Paw Brewing Company produced a "Mr. Sunday Hopped Up Amber Ale" featuring Maxwell's name and likeness.

Maxwell's wife died in 2021. He died three years later, on December 27, 2024, in Paw Paw, at the age of 97. Prior to his death, he was the oldest living alumnus of the Detroit Tigers, Boston Red Sox, and Chicago White Sox.
