= Mike Garcia (baseball, born 1923) =

American baseball player (1923–1986)

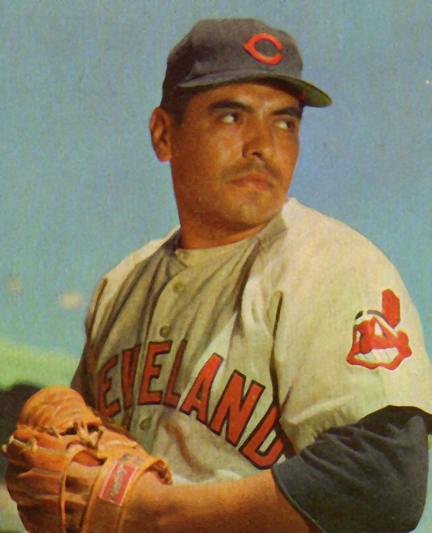
- Garcia c. 1953
- Pitcher
- Born: November 17, 1923; San Gabriel, California, U.S.
- Died: January 13, 1986 (aged 62); Fairview Park, Ohio, U.S.
- Batted: Right Threw: Right

MLB debut
- October 3, 1948, for the Cleveland Indians

Last MLB appearance
- September 2, 1961, for the Washington Senators

MLB statistics
- Win–loss record: 142–97
- Earned run average: 3.27
- Strikeouts: 1,117
- Stats at Baseball Reference

Teams
- Cleveland Indians (1948–1959); Chicago White Sox (1960); Washington Senators (1961)

Career highlights and awards
- 3× All-Star (1952–1954); World Series champion (1948); 2× AL ERA leader (1949, 1954); Cleveland Guardians Hall of Fame

Edward Miguel "Mike" Garcia (November 17, 1923 – January 13, 1986), nicknamed "Big Bear" and "Mexican Mike", was an American right-handed pitcher in Major League Baseball (MLB). Garcia was born in San Gabriel, California, and grew up in Orosi, Tulare County.

Garcia entered minor league baseball at the age of 18. After one season, he joined the U.S. Army and served for three years. Following his honorable discharge, he returned to baseball. He was promoted to MLB in 1948. He played 12 of his 14 major league seasons for the Cleveland Indians.

From 1949 to 1954, Garcia joined Bob Lemon, Early Wynn, and Bob Feller on the Indians' "Big Four" pitching staff. Historians consider the "Big Four" to be one of the greatest starting pitching rotations in baseball history. During those six seasons with the "Big Four", Garcia compiled a record of 104 wins against 57 losses. He had two 20-win seasons and led the American League (AL) in earned run average (ERA) and shutouts twice each.

Garcia's best season came in 1954 when the Indians won a league record 111 games. Baseball historian Stephen Lombardi said that Garcia may have been the best AL pitcher that year. Garcia remained with the Indians until 1959, but never duplicated the success he had achieved in 1954. In his last five seasons with Cleveland, he finished with losing records three times. After leaving the Indians, Garcia spent a season with the Chicago White Sox and a season with the Washington Senators.

Garcia retired from baseball in 1961. He developed diabetes within a few years and suffered from kidney disease and heart problems until his death. Garcia died outside Cleveland at the age of 62 and was buried in his home state of California. He was the only member of the "Big Four" not elected to the National Baseball Hall of Fame, but he has been included on a list of the 100 Greatest Indians and has been inducted into the Cleveland Indians Hall of Fame. Baseball experts and former teammates have commented on Garcia's overpowering pitching, his fine control and his low ERA.

== Early life ==
Garcia was born in San Gabriel, California, and was of both Indigenous Gabrieleño and Mexican heritage. He grew up on a ranch in Orosi, California, where his father, Merced Garcia, moved the family when Mike was 2. Mike's family had close ties to that of Atlanta Braves infielder Marty Perez, and the two referred to each other as cousins.

Mike's father raised horses, and Mike aspired to race them. He participated in one race and was thrown from the horse. Garcia played four years of high school baseball, the first three years at Orosi High School and the last at Visalia High School.

Garcia was pitching in semipro baseball when Cleveland Indians scout Willis Butler noticed him in Tulare, California. In 1942, Butler signed him as an amateur free agent to the organization's Class D farm team, the Appleton Papermakers of the Wisconsin State League. Garcia earned a 10–10 win–loss record with Appleton. He spent the next three years as a signalman in the United States Army during World War II, serving in Europe as a member of the Signal Corps.

Garcia was discharged from the Army at the age of 22 and returned to the Cleveland organization. He played for the Class C Bakersfield Indians of the California League. With Bakersfield, Garcia's ERA and strikeouts led the league and he earned 22 wins. In 1947 he joined the Cleveland Indians during spring training, but he was assigned to the Class A Wilkes-Barre Barons of the Eastern League by Cleveland coach Bill McKechnie. He finished the season with 17 wins and a 3.24 ERA. In 1948, he pitched for the Double-A Oklahoma City Indians of the Texas League and earned 19 wins.

== Major league career ==
=== Early career ===
Garcia debuted with the Indians on October 3, 1948, just before the Indians played in the 1948 World Series. He allowed three hits and no runs in two innings, and he struck out one batter. The Indians won the World Series in six games. It was the franchise's second World Series victory, but Garcia did not make a World Series appearance.

Nicknamed "The Big Bear" by teammate Joe Gordon for his large frame, Garcia was listed at 6 feet 1 inch (1.85 m), 200 lb (91 kg) during his career. Garcia said that his actual playing weight was between 215 and 220 lb (97–100 kg). Garcia also acquired the nickname "Mexican Mike" in the press. However, Garcia's minority status was not a novelty. The Indians had signed Larry Doby, the first black player in the American League, in 1947. The 1951 team added manager Al López and Latino players Minnie Miñoso and Jesse Flores to a squad that already included Garcia and Mexican player Bobby Ávila. Early on, Garcia was paired to room with Avila, who had just signed with the team and did not speak English. Garcia served as a translator for Avila well beyond their first season together.

Garcia returned to the Indians in 1949. A newspaper article predicted that Garcia might fill big needs in the Cleveland bullpen. Garcia saw action as a starter and as a relief pitcher that year, starting 20 of his 41 regular season appearances. He finished his rookie season with a 14–5 record, a league-leading 2.36 ERA, 94 strikeouts and five shutouts. Fellow pitcher Bob Feller said, "From the beginning, Mike was a sneaky quick pitcher. For a big guy, he was certainly mobile." One year removed from his rookie season, expectations from Indians general manager Hank Greenberg and pitching coach Mel Harder were for Garcia to become a key piece of the Indians' rotation. "Garcia has all the potentialities of a really great pitcher. I see no reason he should not reach greatness this season", Greenberg said. Garcia finished the 1950 season 11–11.

By the 1951 season, media sources had given the nickname "Big Four" to the pitching combination of Garcia, Bob Feller, Bob Lemon and Early Wynn. Garcia had learned to control the curveball that Harder taught him in spring training of 1949. Harder said that Garcia already had a terrific fastball, but that he became a good pitcher by learning the curveball and working on his control. Cleveland sportswriter Hal Lebovitz wrote, "Garcia, until the day he died, would tell me how much of the success he owed to Harder." Garcia also once admitted to throwing an occasional spitball, an illegal pitch. "Maybe a dozen in my life. I'm sure plenty of the great pitchers did", he said.

Garcia pitched a 10-hit complete game on June 4, 1951, in an 8–2 Cleveland win, helping the Indians beat New York Yankees pitcher Ed Lopat for the first time in two years. Before the game, Lopat's record was 8–0 on the season. Garcia improved his season mark to 5–3. On August 7 against the St. Louis Browns, Garcia reached a career-high 15 wins. In a 5–1 victory, he also recorded his second career home run. Garcia won 20 games in 1951 and finished fifth in the AL with six saves.

=== All-Star seasons ===
In 1952, Garcia made his first of three consecutive All-Star teams. As the Indians battled for the 1952 American League pennant heading into September, he began the month with three consecutive shutouts during an eight-game Indian win streak. The Indians faced Ed Lopat and the Yankees again on September 14 in what Associated Press columnist Jack Hand labeled "one BIG game." In a 7–1 loss, Garcia gave up four earned runs on five hits in three innings. He finished the 1952 season with a 22–11 record, 143 strikeouts, an AL-best six shutouts and four saves. He was second in the league in ERA (2.37), games (46) and innings pitched (292.1, behind Lemon). Only Wynn had more wins (23) among right-handers; Garcia and Lemon had 22 each, and the pair tied for the league lead with 36 starts. Garcia finished ninth in the 1952 MVP voting.

In 1953, Garcia and Lemon were named pitchers on the AL All-Star squad. Doby and Al Rosen were also on the team, with Rosen selected as the game's MVP. Garcia finished the season 18–9; he pitched a career-high 29 complete games with 134 strikeouts and a 3.25 ERA. Like the previous season, Lemon and Garcia finished first and second in the American League in innings pitched. Garcia was labeled "one of the hardest-throwing pitchers in the game" by The Cleveland Press Guide. As Feller's dominance faded in the latter part of his career, Garcia, Lemon, and Wynn were increasingly referred to as the "Big Three".

On May 16, 1954, Garcia pitched a one-hitter against the Philadelphia Athletics in a 6–0 Indians win. Garcia called it the finest game of his career. He was selected for his third and final All-Star Game when American League manager Casey Stengel added him, Lemon, and Doby to an American League roster that already featured Avila and top vote-getter Al Rosen. During a late July exhibition game, Garcia learned that his father had died at the age of 65; Garcia's son Michael was born the same day. He missed several games that year with a broken blood vessel in his throwing hand, but he managed 45 appearances on the season.

Entering the final regular season game in 1954, Garcia had 19 wins; he would have received a bonus if he collected 20 wins. After pitching 12 innings, he left with the score tied at 6–6. The Tigers won after 13 innings, 8–7. Earning a no-decision, Garcia failed to reach the 20-win mark. However, Greenberg had assured Garcia he would receive a bonus whether he won 20 games or not. Garcia pitched six innings or more in six out of his seven August appearances. He earned wins in three out of his last four appearances, and pitched seven innings or more in all four appearances. The team finished 111–43. The win total broke a 154-game season record, and the team had the lowest team ERA (2.78) in the AL since the dead-ball era season of 1919. Garcia was 19–8 with 129 strikeouts, again leading the AL in both ERA (2.64) and shutouts (5).

In the 1954 World Series, the heavily favored Indians were defeated by the New York Giants. Garcia started game three, but was replaced by a pinch hitter in the bottom of the third inning, already trailing 4–0. Author Jonathan Knight described the progression of the game: "...a throwing error by George Strickland, and Mike Garcia had struggled in the opening frame, allowing three baserunners, as panic began to creep into Municipal Stadium. For the first time all year, it was warranted." The Giants won the game, 6–2, and won game four to claim the Series.

=== Final years with Indians ===
From 1955 to 1959, Garcia finished with losing records in three of five seasons. The 1955 season represented Garcia's first losing record (11–13) and his first season ERA over 4.00. The 1954 ERA leader finished 1955 with a 4.02 ERA. The Indians finished in second place in the AL at 93–61, three games behind the Yankees. Garcia repeated a losing mark on the 1956 season (11–12), the only time in his career he finished with consecutive losing seasons. He and Wynn were among those who tied for second place in shutouts on the season (4) behind fellow Indian Herb Score. Cleveland finished 88–66 and nine games behind first place, which went to the Yankees again. Lopez was replaced as manager by Kerby Farrell. In spring training before the 1957 season, Farrell observed that the league's best pitching staff could not carry the team alone. Garcia ended the season 12–8 with a 3.75 ERA, but the Indians finished sixth in the American League. Their 76–77 finish was the club's first losing record since 1946.

Bobby Bragan replaced Farrell as manager to begin the 1958 season. During a spring training game in March, Garcia slipped on a wet pitcher's mound and injured his back. He did not make his first regular season appearance until April 27 and he underwent surgery in June for a herniated disc. He finished the season with a 1–0 record in six appearances and eight innings of work. That same month, Bragan was fired as manager. He was replaced by former Indians player Joe Gordon, and the Indians finished 77–76.

Garcia elected to become a free agent in the offseason, but he returned to the Indians, saying that his home and his dry cleaning business were in Cleveland. "Everything being equal, I'll sign with the Indians if I decide I'm able to pitch... This is a friendly city and I like it", he said. During a spring training game in March 1959, Garcia was hit in the knee by a Billy Consolo line drive and was carried off the field on a stretcher and taken to a Tucson hospital. He did not make his first season start until May 3, when he allowed four hits and no earned runs in a complete game loss. He finished with a 3–6 record, a 4.00 ERA and 72 innings pitched in his twelfth and final season with the Indians.

=== Chicago White Sox and Washington Senators (1960–61) ===
Garcia signed with the Chicago White Sox for the 1960 season, reuniting with manager Al López and former Indians owner and team president Bill Veeck. Veeck said, "Our reports on Mike were real good. He might help us in 1960." He appeared in 15 games and pitched 17.2 innings with 4.58 ERA and 0–0 record. In July 1961, the expansion Washington Senators signed the 37-year-old Garcia to a contract. The Senators placed him on waivers before the end of the season. He finished with a 0–1 record, pitched 19 innings in 16 games and earned a 4.74 ERA. Garcia finished his major league career with a 142–97 record, 1,117 strikeouts, a 3.27 ERA, 27 shutouts and 23 saves in 428 games (281 starts) and 2,174.6 innings.

== Beyond baseball ==
Garcia married Gerda Martin on January 13, 1951; they had three children. He served as a sponsor for Camel cigarettes during his playing days. Garcia raced midget cars during and after his baseball career. Garcia injured the index finger of his throwing hand while working on a midget car in late 1959, but the wound was repaired without lasting effects.

== Illness and death ==
Garcia developed diabetes in his forties. As a result, he suffered from kidney disease and heart damage in the last years of his life. Faced with dialysis three times per week, Garcia joined his former teammates at fundraising events to defray his medical expenses. He died in Fairview Park, Ohio on January 13, 1986, at the age of 62. He died on his 35th wedding anniversary. He was buried in his hometown of Visalia, California. Garcia, whose annual salary was never greater than $35,000, died with more than $100,000 in outstanding medical bills.

== Legacy ==
Garcia was not selected a member of the National Baseball Hall of Fame. His normal window of eligibility has closed, and he can be elected only by decision of the Hall's Veterans Committee. Baseball historian Bill James dismissed Garcia's low ERA due to the "cold, cavernous Cleveland Municipal Stadium, which at that time had a pitcher's mound higher than white cliffs of Dover". Referring to Garcia's great seasons of 1949 to 1954, baseball historian Wayne Corbett countered, "Garcia's more famous teammates enjoyed the same home-field advantage, but it was Garcia who recorded the staff's lowest ERA in four of those six seasons." Historian Stephen Lombardi wrote, "It is a shame that Mike Garcia is sometimes disregarded. A career such as his does not deserve to fade away from the memory of the overall baseball public." Cleveland sportswriter and Hall of Fame voter Hal Lebovitz wrote, "If Garcia had pitched long enough, he probably would be in the Hall of Fame."

Teammates have recalled the difficulty that Garcia presented for opposing hitters. George Strickland, who roomed with Garcia on road trips for several seasons, described Garcia as "a big, strong, powerful pitcher" who threw a "very heavy ball." Bob Lemon describes his pitches similarly. "Hitting a Garcia pitch was like hitting a shotput", Lemon said. Lemon also commented on his deceptive control. "Mike was a sneak. His physical size belied really fine control", said Lemon.

Garcia was named one of the 100 Greatest Indians in March 2001 and inducted into the Cleveland Indians Hall of Fame on August 11, 2007. Each year, the Indians organization gives the Mike Garcia Award to an area high school student who demonstrates "outstanding success in the classroom, on the field, and in their community."

== See also ==
- List of Major League Baseball annual ERA leaders
