= Hank Aguirre =

American baseball player (1931–1994)

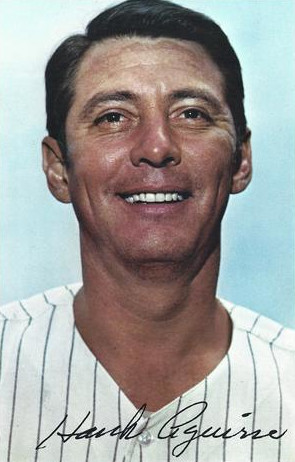
- Aguirre in 1969
- Pitcher
- Born: January 31, 1931; Azusa, California, U.S.
- Died: September 5, 1994 (aged 63); Bloomfield Hills, Michigan, U.S.
- Batted: Right Threw: Left

MLB debut
- September 10, 1955, for the Cleveland Indians

Last MLB appearance
- June 24, 1970, for the Chicago Cubs

MLB statistics
- Win–loss record: 75–72
- Earned run average: 3.25
- Strikeouts: 856
- Stats at Baseball Reference

Teams
- Cleveland Indians (1955–1957); Detroit Tigers (1958–1967); Los Angeles Dodgers (1968); Chicago Cubs (1969–1970)

Career highlights and awards
- 2× All-Star (1962, 1962²); AL ERA leader (1962)

Henry John Aguirre (/əˈɡɪəriː/ ə-GEER-ee; January 31, 1931 – September 5, 1994), commonly known as Hank Aguirre, was an American professional baseball player and business entrepreneur. He played in Major League Baseball (MLB) as a left-handed pitcher from 1955 to 1970, most prominently for the Detroit Tigers where he was a two-time All-Star player and, was the American League ERA leader in 1962. Aguirre also played for the Cleveland Indians, Los Angeles Dodgers and the Chicago Cubs. After his athletic career, he went on to become a successful businessman in Detroit, Michigan.

== Early life ==
Aguirre was born on January 31, 1931, in Azusa, California, during the height of the Great Depression; and was raised in San Gabriel. His mother Jenny Alva was born in Los Angeles in 1906, and his father José Aguirre was born in Jalisco, Mexico in 1902 and emigrated with his family during the time of the Mexican Revolution. One family story is that Pancho Villa threatened Aguirre's grandfather unless he provided free saddles to Villa's men, which inspired the family's move to the United States. José and Jenny had seven children.

In his youth, Hank Aguirre worked for his father's business, the Aguirre Tortillas Factory in San Gabriel. He made, packaged and delivered tortillas. At 4 a.m., the young Aguirre would make deliveries — mostly running — before school. He graduated from Mark Keppel High School in Alhambra, California, in 1949, but his "goofy feet" (his words) prevented him from being selected to be part of the baseball team (instead becoming a cheerleader). He did play sandlot baseball and American Legion ball. He graduated from East Los Angeles College in 1951, where he played baseball, and studied courses on business and sales.

He was nicknamed "Mex" because he was of Mexican descent. During his career he had been the recipient of slurs because of his Mexican heritage, though he was also very popular among his future teammates in major league baseball. In 1975, he would begin to strive deeply to improve the lives of Latinos in life generally, and in obtaining leadership positions in major league baseball.

== Professional baseball ==
Aguirre pitched in the big leagues for 16 years for four different teams.

=== Cleveland Indians ===
Aguirre was scouted by major league teams while at Chapman, and was signed by Cleveland Indians scout Tom Downey in 1951. This was also an important moment for Aguirre because it turned his father from a sceptic about pursuing a baseball career, into a supporter. He was assigned to the Class-C Bakersfield Indians of the California League. He started 23 games, had a 14–9 won–loss record, with a 3.28 earned run average (ERA) and 149 strikeouts in 184 innings pitched. He played Class-B baseball in 1953, and in 1954 was assigned to the Single-A Reading Indians, where he had a 14–8 record with a 2.69 ERA. In 1955, he was promoted to the Triple-A Indianapolis Indians, where he was 11–9, with a 3.24 ERA.

Aguirre got his first major league experience in 1955, pitching in four games for the Indians, with one start. On September 24, 1955, in his first major league start, Aguirre pitched a complete game, three-hit, shutout against the Detroit Tigers, in a 7–0 victory.

As a rookie for the Cleveland Indians in 1956, Aguirre struck out Boston Red Sox legend Ted Williams the first time he faced him. After the game, Aguirre asked Williams to autograph the ball. Reluctantly, Williams complied. A couple of weeks later Aguirre faced Williams again. This time the "Splendid Splinter" smashed Aguirre's first offering for a home run. While circling the bases, Williams yelled to Aguirre, "Hey kid, if you get that ball, I'll sign it for you, too." But he played sparingly in 1956-57, and was used in only 16 games in 1956 and ten in 1957.

=== Detroit Tigers ===
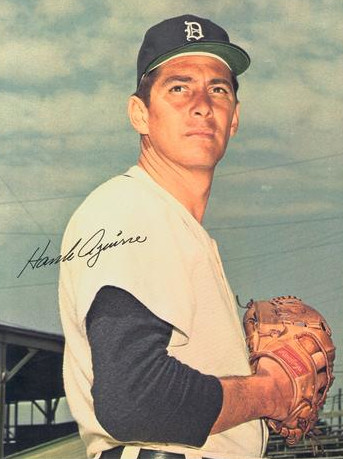
Aguirre, circa 1966

Before the 1958 season began, Aguirre was traded to the Detroit Tigers, along with Jim Hegan for Hal Woodeshick and Jay Porter, where he remained for 10 years from 1958 to 1967. Aguirre was principally a relief pitcher from 1958-61, playing in 127 games and starting only nine.

1962 was Aguirre's best career season. During a May 26, 1962 game against the New York Yankees, Tigers manager Bob Scheffing used him as a starter when Don Mossi had arm trouble. Scheffing wanted a left-hander to pitch against the Yankees, and he chose Aguirre. Aguirre defeated the Yankees, 2–1, throwing a complete game and giving up only five hits (the sole run coming on a Moose Skowron home run). Aguirre joined the Tigers starting rotation and finished the 1962 season with a 2.21 ERA in 42 games (22 as a starter), the best in Detroit since Hal Newhouser in 1946.

Having pitched over 100 innings (216 in total) for the first time in his career, Aguirre led the Major Leagues in ERA (0.33 points lower than Sandy Koufax who was second best), won 16 games, and was selected to the American League All-Star team. He also led the American League in WHIP (walks plus hits per innings pitched) with a 1.051 average; and led all players in the AL in WAR (wins above replacement). Aguirre also finished 17th in the 1962 American League Most Valuable Player voting.

=== Final playing years ===
Aguirre lost his spot in the Tigers starting rotation in 1966, and returned to the bullpen. Before the start of the 1968 season, Aguirre was traded by the Tigers to the Los Angeles Dodgers for a player to be named later. In one season with the Dodgers, appearing in 25 games (all in relief), Aguirre allowed only three runs in 39 1/3 innings for a 0.69 ERA. Despite the good season, Aguirre was released by the Dodgers and spent the final two seasons of his big league career pitching for Leo Durocher's Chicago Cubs, where he was a combined 4–0 in 1969 and 1970. He had a 2.60 ERA in 41 appearances in 1969, but appeared in only 17 games the following year with a 4.50 ERA. The Cubs released him during the 1970 season, on July 6.

In 16 MLB seasons, Aguirre finished with a record of 75–72 in 1,375 2/3 innings pitched, with 856 strikeouts (compared to only 479 walks) and an ERA of 3.25.

=== Coaching ===
Aguirre spent three years (1972–74) as a coach for the Cubs. He was initially hired as the team's bench coach, tasked with serving as an intermediary between irascible manager Leo Durocher, his players and the Chicago media. The post was created in the aftermath of a player revolt against Durocher in 1971. After Durocher's firing in July 1972, Aguirre continued on the Cubs' staff as bullpen coach (1973) and pitching coach (1974). He managed in the Oakland Athletics' organization in 1975–76. He managed the Tucson Toros in 1975, with a second place finish in the Triple-A Pacific Coast League at 72–71.

== Batting ==
Aguirre had a reputation as one of baseball's worst-hitting pitchers. He had an .085 lifetime average, going 33-for-388 at the plate, with no home runs, striking out 236 times while drawing 14 walks.

== Business career and community service ==
In 1979, with the encouragement and support of Jack Masterson, an executive with Volkswagen of America, and attorney John Noonan, Aguirre founded Mexican Industries, Inc. He has mortgaged his home for $350,000 to use as startup funds for the new business. The company, based in Detroit, operated as a labor-intensive, minority-oriented enterprise that supplied specialized parts to American automobile manufacturers. After a difficult start, Mexican Industries thrived during the 1980s, becoming a multimillion-dollar business and creating hundreds of jobs (primarily for the Hispanics of southwestern Detroit's "Mexicantown"). He started with eight employees and had over 1,000 by the mid-1990s, with revenue in excess of $100 million. In 1987 Aguirre was named "Businessman of the Year" by the U.S. Hispanic Chamber of Commerce.

Aguirre made himself available to the Mexican-American community in Detroit, known as Mexican Village or Mexicantown. He involved himself with individuals lives, and also pushed the city's governmental leaders to give their attention to this community and other minorities. He created scholarship funds for local schools, awarding $50,000 a year to deserving students; and helped pay for after-hours programming for inner city students after-school activities. When a new plant for Mexican Industries was being dedicated by Detroit's mayor Dennis Archer, he said that Aguirre's name "'is like magic and gold wherever I go and wherever I've been.'"

On July 21, 1993, Aguirre received the Roberto Clemente Award for Excellence.

Aguirre died on September 5, 1994, following a two-year battle with prostate cancer. He is buried in San Gabriel in the churchyard of the (Roman Catholic) Mission San Gabriel Arcángel, "where he worshiped as a boy." Upon his death, control of the privately owned company Aguirre had founded passed to his adult children. In 1999, Mexican Industries, Inc., was unionized (following several unsuccessful attempts over the previous two decades) by the United Auto Workers labor union under Bob King. In 2001, the firm filed for bankruptcy, laid off its workers, and subsequently closed its doors. According to union activists, "Workers blame[d] the owners, not only for hostility toward their union but for mismanaging the company."

== See also ==
- List of Major League Baseball annual ERA leaders

Preceded by Larry Jansen	Chicago Cubs pitching coach 1974	Succeeded by Marv Grissom
