= Connie Johnson (baseball) =

American baseball player (1922–2004)

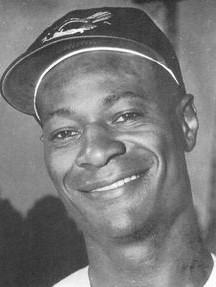
- Pitcher
- Born: December 27, 1922; Stone Mountain, Georgia, U.S.
- Died: November 28, 2004 (aged 81); Kansas City, Missouri, U.S.
- Batted: Right Threw: Right

Professional debut
- NgL: 1940, for the Toledo-Indianapolis Crawfords
- MLB: April 17, 1953, for the Chicago White Sox

Last MLB appearance
- September 14, 1958, for the Baltimore Orioles

MLB (Note: On December 16, 2020, Major League Baseball declared the Negro leagues, from the span of 1920–1948, to be a "Major League". Johnson's statistics reflect his time in the Negro leagues from 1940–1948.) statistics
- Win–loss record: 60–50
- Earned run average: 3.76
- Strikeouts: 676
- Stats at Baseball Reference

Teams
- Negro leagues: Toledo-Indianapolis Crawfords (1940); Kansas City Monarchs (1940–1942, 1946–1950); Major League Baseball: Chicago White Sox (1953, 1955–1956); Baltimore Orioles (1956–1958)

Career highlights and awards
- 2× NgL All-Star (1940, 1950); Negro American League wins leader (1946); Negro American League strikeout leader (1946)
Military career
Allegiance	United States
Branch	United States Army
Service years	1943–1945

Connie Johnson (December 27, 1922 – November 28, 2004) was an American professional baseball pitcher who played in the Negro leagues and Major League Baseball. He was born Clifford Johnson Jr. in Stone Mountain, Georgia.

== Baseball career ==
=== Negro leagues ===
In 1940, Johnson initially played for the minor league Atlanta Black Crackers, then quickly moved up to the Toledo-Indianapolis Crawfords before ending up on the Kansas City Monarchs, all at the age of 17. After a solid season, he was selected to the East-West All-Star Game, being the youngest player ever to achieve that distinction.

Afterwards, Johnson played a key role in the 1941 and 1942 Negro League World Series titles won by the Monarchs, a team that included future Hall of Famers Satchel Paige and Hilton Smith. In 1943, Johnson enlisted in the Army during World War II for three years.

Following his discharge in 1946, Johnson returned to the Monarchs and went 9-3 with a 3.46 earned run average, helping his team win another pennant, even though he did not pitch in the Series. He went 4-1 in the next two seasons, but rebounded in 1950 with an 11-2 mark and a 2.17 ERA while appearing in his second All-Star Game.

=== Canadian Provincial League ===
In 1951, Johnson played for the St. Hyacinthe Saints club based in the Canadian Provincial League, where he posted a 15-14 record with a 3.24 ERA and a league-high 172 strikeouts. At the end of the season, his contract was purchased by the Chicago White Sox.

=== Major League Baseball ===
==== Chicago White Sox ====
In 1952, Johnson was assigned to Class A Colorado Springs, where he finished 18-9 with a 3.38 ERA and set a Western League record with 233 strikeouts. He was then promoted to the White Sox and made his major league debut at the age of 30 on April 17, 1953.

During his rookie season at Chicago, Johnson pitched in 14 games, starting ten of them, going 4–4 with a 3.56 ERA and 44 strikeouts. After spending the entire 1954 season in the minors with Triple A Charleston Senators, Johnson started 16 games for Chicago in 1955. He finished the season 7–4 with a 3.45 ERA and 72 strikeouts.

In his first two years, Johnson was sandwiched between Triple A Toronto Maple Leafs and the Sox. As a result, in 1956, he pitched in five games with Chicago and went 0–1 with six strikeouts and a 3.65 ERA.

Overall, Johnson went 11–9 with a 3.51 ERA and 122 strikeouts in 36 games (28 starts) with the White Sox, starting 28 of them, and going 11–9 with 122 strikeouts. During the midseason, Johnson was traded by Chicago along with Mike Fornieles, George Kell, and Bob Nieman to the Baltimore Orioles in exchange for Jim Wilson and Dave Philley.

==== Baltimore Orioles ====
Johnson started 25 games for the Orioles in 1956, going 9–10 with a 3.43 ERA and 130 strikeouts in 183 2/3 innings, including two shutouts and nine complete games.

On June 21, 1956, Johnson was on the losing end of a double one-hitter, Jack Harshman winning, 1-0.

His most productive season came in 1957, when he finished 14–11 with a 3.20 ERA for a lousy team that finished in fifth place in the then eight-team American League. Besides, Johnson posted career numbers in starts (30), complete games (14), shutouts (3), and innings (242.0).

During his final season in 1958, Johnson was the Opening Day starter for the Orioles and defeated the Washington Senators, 6–1, at Memorial Stadium. Overall, he went 6–9 with a 3.88 ERA and 68 strikeouts.

In a five-year major league career, Johnson finished with a 40-39 record and 3.44 ERA in 123 pitching appearances (100 starts), including 34 complete games and eight shutouts, while striking out 497 and walking 257 in 716.0 innings of work

=== Final years ===
Johnson then returned to the minors to play for the Vancouver Mounties of the Pacific Coast League from 1959 to 1960. He finished his career in 1961, while pitching with the Pericos de Puebla in the Mexican League. In 182 minor league games, he went 76-44 with a 3.34 ERA in 1034.0 innings.

=== Caribbean highlights ===
In between, Johnson played winter ball with the Spur Cola Colonites club of the Panamanian League, which won the 1950-51 pennant and represented Panama in the 1951 Caribbean Series. The team's only victory in the series came behind a strong pitching effort from Johnson, who pitched a two-run, eight-hit complete game over the highly favored Leones del Habana Cuban team.

Afterwards, Johnson pitched for the Tigres de Marianao in the 1954-55 Cuban League season, and was a bright spot for the last-place Marianao, going 12-11 with a 3.29 ERA while leading the league in strikeouts (123), shutouts (5) and innings pitched (174 2/3).

After his playing days, Johnson worked for the Ford Motor Company in Kansas City, Missouri, retiring in 1985. He died in 2004 at the age of 81.

== See also ==
- List of Negro league baseball players who played in Major League Baseball
