= 1956 Major League Baseball All-Star Game =

1956 American baseball competition

	1	2	3	4	5	6	7	8	9	R	H	E
National League	0	0	1	2	1	1	2	0	0	7	11	0
American League	0	0	0	0	0	3	0	0	0	3	11	0
- Date: July 10, 1956
- Venue: Griffith Stadium
- City: Washington, D.C.
- Managers: Walter Alston (Brooklyn Dodgers); Casey Stengel (New York Yankees)
- Attendance: 28,843 – Time of Game: 2:45
- Television: NBC
- TV announcers: Mel Allen and Al Helfer
- Radio: Mutual
- Radio announcers: Bob Neal and Bob Wolff

The 1956 Major League Baseball All-Star Game was the 23rd playing of the midsummer classic between the all-stars of the American League (AL) and National League (NL), the two leagues comprising Major League Baseball. The game was held on July 10, 1956, at Griffith Stadium in Washington, D.C. the home of the Washington Senators of the American League.

== Opening lineups ==
American League			National League
Player	Team	Pos	Player	Team	Pos
Harvey Kuenn	Detroit Tigers	SS	Johnny Temple	Cincinnati Redlegs	2B
Nellie Fox	Chicago White Sox	2B	Frank Robinson	Cincinnati Redlegs	LF
Ted Williams	Boston Red Sox	LF	Stan Musial	St. Louis Cardinals	RF
Mickey Mantle	New York Yankees	CF	Ken Boyer	St. Louis Cardinals	3B
Yogi Berra	New York Yankees	C	Gus Bell	Cincinnati Redlegs	CF
Al Kaline	Detroit Tigers	RF	Dale Long	Pittsburgh Pirates	1B
Mickey Vernon	Washington Senators	1B	Ed Bailey	Cincinnati Redlegs	C
George Kell	Baltimore Orioles	3B	Roy McMillan	Cincinnati Redlegs	SS
Billy Pierce	Chicago White Sox	P	Bob Friend	Pittsburgh Pirates	P

== Rosters ==
Players in italics have since been inducted into the National Baseball Hall of Fame.

1956 National League All-Star Game roster
Pitchers: 43 (United States) Johnny Antonelli; 19 (United States) Bob Friend; 41 (United States) Clem Labine *; 46 (United States) Brooks Lawrence *; 39 (United States) Joe Nuxhall *; 36 (United States) Robin Roberts *; 21 (United States) Warren Spahn; Catchers: 6 (United States) Ed Bailey; 39 (United States) Roy Campanella; 1 (United States) Del Crandall *; 29 (United States) Stan Lopata *	Infielders: 14 (United States) Ernie Banks *; 14 (United States) Ken Boyer; 19 (United States) Jim Gilliam *; 18 (United States) Ted Kluszewski; 3 (United States) Dale Long; 41 (United States) Eddie Mathews *; 11 (United States) Roy McMillan; 16 (United States) Johnny Temple; Outfielders: 44 (United States) Hank Aaron; 25 (United States) Gus Bell; 24 (United States) Willie Mays; 6 (United States) Stan Musial; 8 (United States) Rip Repulski; 20 (United States) Frank Robinson; 4 (United States) Duke Snider	Manager: 24 (United States) Walter Alston; Coaches: 29 (United States) Fred Hutchinson; 1 (United States) Birdie Tebbetts; * = Did not play

1956 American League All-Star Game roster
Pitchers: 23 (United States) Tom Brewer; 16 (United States) Whitey Ford; 53 (United States) Johnny Kucks *; 20 (United States) Ray Narleski *; 19 (United States) Billy Pierce; 27 (United States) Herb Score; 18 (United States) Frank Sullivan *; 30 (United States) Jim Wilson; 24 (United States) Early Wynn; Catchers: 8 (United States) Yogi Berra; 10 (United States) Sherm Lollar	Infielders: 8 (United States) Ray Boone; 2 (United States) Nellie Fox; 1 (United States) George Kell; 26 (United States) Harvey Kuenn; 1 (United States) Billy Martin; 12 (United States) Gil McDougald *; 7 (Puerto Rico) Vic Power; 3 (United States) Mickey Vernon; Outfielders: 6 (United States) Al Kaline; 7 (United States) Mickey Mantle; 7 (United States) Charlie Maxwell *; 37 (United States) Jim Piersall; 26 (United States) Roy Sievers; 38 (United States) Harry Simpson; 9 (United States) Ted Williams	Manager: 37 (United States) Casey Stengel; Coaches: 7 (United States) Chuck Dressen; 31 (United States) Jim Turner; * = Did not play

== Umpires ==
Position	Umpire
Home Plate	Charlie Berry (AL)
First Base	Babe Pinelli (NL)
Second Base	Eddie Hurley (AL)
Third Base	Artie Gore (NL)
Left Field	Red Flaherty (AL)
Right Field	Bill Jackowski (NL)

== Line score ==
Tuesday, July 10, 1956 1:00 pm (ET) at Griffith Stadium, Washington, D.C.
Team	1	2	3	4	5	6	7	8	9	R	H	E
National League	0	0	1	2	1	1	2	0	0	7	11	0
American League	0	0	0	0	0	3	0	0	0	3	11	0
WP: Friend LP: Pierce Sv: Antonelli; Home runs: NL: Mays, Musial; AL: Mantle, Williams

How the runs scored
Team	Inning	Play	NL	AL
NL	3rd	Temple singled, McMillan scored	1	0
NL	4th	Mays homered, Boyer scored	3	0
NL	5th	Boyer singled, Temple scored	4	0
NL	6th	Wild pitch, Kluszewski scored	5	0
AL	6th	Williams homered, Fox scored; Mantle homered	5	3
NL	7th	Musial homered; Kluszewski doubled, Mays scored	7	3

Play-by-play at Baseball-Reference.com
