= Tom Brewer =

American baseball player (1931–2018)

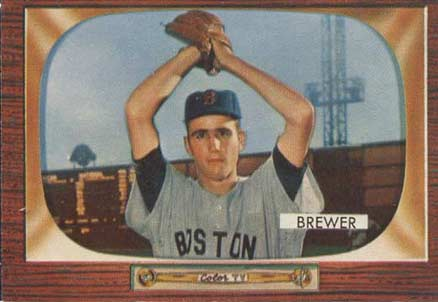
- Pitcher
- Born: September 3, 1931; Wadesboro, North Carolina, U.S.
- Died: February 15, 2018 (aged 86); Cheraw, South Carolina, U.S.
- Batted: Right Threw: Right

MLB debut
- April 18, 1954, for the Boston Red Sox

Last MLB appearance
- September 27, 1961, for the Boston Red Sox

MLB statistics
- Win–loss record: 91–82
- Earned run average: 4.00
- Strikeouts: 733
- Stats at Baseball Reference

Teams
- Boston Red Sox (1954–1961)

Career highlights and awards
- All-Star (1956)

Thomas Austin Brewer (September 3, 1931 – February 15, 2018) was an American professional baseball player. The right-handed pitcher appeared in 241 games over eight seasons (1954–1961) for the Boston Red Sox of Major League Baseball. He was listed as 6 feet 1 inch (1.85 m) tall and 175 pounds (79 kg).

Although born in Wadesboro, North Carolina, Brewer was a lifelong resident of Cheraw, a nearby town located across the South Carolina border. He signed with the Red Sox in 1951 after attending Elon College, and in his first pro season won 19 of 22 decisions in the Class D North Carolina State League. It was his only season in minor league baseball. After two years of United States Army service during the Korean War, he made the Red Sox' varsity pitching staff for 1954 and would post seven straight seasons of double-digit wins as a Bosox hurler.

His best season came in 1956. Brewer went 19–9 (.679) with career bests in complete games (15) and shutouts (four) and was selected to the American League All-Star squad. But he was treated roughly in the July 10, 1956, contest at Griffith Stadium. Entering the game in the sixth inning with the Junior Circuit already trailing 4–0, he allowed three runs (all earned) and three hits, including a home run to eventual Baseball Hall of Famer Stan Musial, in two full innings pitched. He also threw two wild pitches. The rival National League won the game, 7–3.

Brewer's last .500-or-above full season came in 1958. After two losing campaigns, Brewer began to experience shoulder woes in 1961. He worked in only ten games all year and retired at season's end. During his MLB career, he posted a 91–82 won–lost record and an earned run average of an even 4.00. He logged 75 complete games and 13 shutouts in 217 games started, with three saves out of the Boston bullpen. In 1,5091/3 innings pitched, he gave up 1,478 hits and 669 bases on balls, with 733 career strikeouts.

After leaving pro baseball, he became the pitching coach for the Cheraw Braves High School baseball team in his hometown, where the school's baseball field was named in his honor on March 21, 2009.
