= Johnny Kucks =

American baseball player (1932-2013)

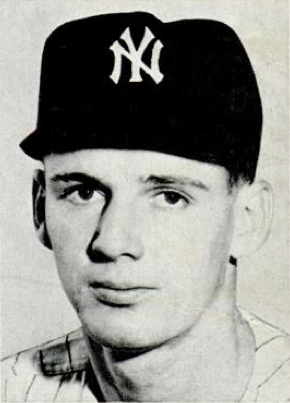
- Kucks in 1956.
- Pitcher
- Born: July 27, 1932; Hoboken, New Jersey, U.S.
- Died: October 31, 2013 (aged 81); Saddle River, New Jersey, U.S.
- Batted: Right Threw: Right

MLB debut
- April 17, 1955, for the New York Yankees

Last MLB appearance
- September 25, 1960, for the Kansas City Athletics

MLB statistics
- Win–loss record: 54–56
- Earned run average: 4.10
- Strikeouts: 338
- Stats at Baseball Reference

Teams
- New York Yankees (1955–1959); Kansas City Athletics (1959–1960)

Career highlights and awards
- All-Star (1956); 2× World Series champion (1956, 1958)

John Charles Kucks (July 27, 1932 – October 31, 2013) was an American pitcher for the New York Yankees and Kansas City Athletics in Major League Baseball. In 1952, he was signed as an amateur free agent. Johnny Kucks won the final game of the 1956 World Series between the Yankees and Brooklyn Dodgers, shutting out the Dodgers, 9–0 at Ebbets Field—the last World Series game ever played in that ballpark.

Born in Hoboken, New Jersey, Kucks grew up in Jersey City and played baseball at William L. Dickinson High School.

== Baseball career ==
On May 26, 1959 he was traded to the Kansas City Athletics, together with Jerry Lumpe and Tom Sturdivant, for Ralph Terry and Héctor López. On October 11, 1961 he was purchased by the Baltimore Orioles from the Athletics, but on December 1, 1961 the Orioles traded him to the St. Louis Cardinals for minor leaguer Ron Kabbes; however, he never played again in the majors.

== Personal ==
A longtime resident of Hillsdale, New Jersey since his days with the Yankees, Kucks worked as a stockbroker after his baseball career ended. He died of cancer on October 31, 2013, at the Villa Marie Claire hospice in Saddle River, New Jersey.
