= Jim Wilson (pitcher) =

American baseball player (1922–1986)

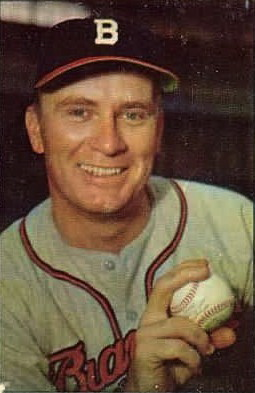
- Wilson in about 1952.
- Pitcher
- Born: February 20, 1922; San Diego, California, U.S.
- Died: September 2, 1986 (aged 64); Newport Beach, California, U.S.
- Batted: Right Threw: Right

MLB debut
- April 18, 1945, for the Boston Red Sox

Last MLB appearance
- September 14, 1958, for the Chicago White Sox

MLB statistics
- Win–loss record: 86–89
- Earned run average: 4.01
- Strikeouts: 692
- Stats at Baseball Reference

Teams
- Boston Red Sox (1945–1946); St. Louis Browns (1948); Philadelphia Athletics (1949); Boston / Milwaukee Braves (1951–1954); Baltimore Orioles (1955–1956); Chicago White Sox (1956–1958)

Career highlights and awards
- 3× All-Star (1954–1956); Pitched a no-hitter on June 12, 1954

James Alger Wilson (February 20, 1922 – September 2, 1986) was an American professional baseball pitcher, scout and front-office executive. Although he was well-traveled as a player and compiled a career winning percentage of only .491 in 175 decisions, he threw the first no-hit, no-run game in Milwaukee's Major League history and was a three-time (1954–56) All-Star who represented both the National and American leagues. During his front office career he served as the third general manager in the franchise history of the Milwaukee Brewers.

== Career ==
=== As a player ===
A native of San Diego, Wilson threw and batted right-handed, stood 6 feet 1 inch (1.85 m) tall and weighed 200 pounds (91 kg). He attended San Diego State University.

Wilson pitched in all or part of 12 seasons (1945–46; 1948–49; 1951–58) for five Major League franchises and six different cities: the Boston Red Sox, St. Louis Browns/Baltimore Orioles, Philadelphia Athletics, Boston / Milwaukee Braves and Chicago White Sox. He began his pro career during World War II in 1943 in the Red Sox' farm system and in his second year, 1944, he won 19 games with the top-level Louisville Colonels of the American Association. He made the 1945 Red Sox' roster coming out of spring training and started 21 games for them during the season's first four months. In his 21st start, on August 9 at Briggs Stadium, Wilson worked into the tenth inning of a 3–3 game. With one out, Detroit Tigers' slugger Hank Greenberg hit a line drive back through the box that struck Wilson in the head, fracturing his skull and sending him to Henry Ford Hospital. The injury sidelined Wilson for the rest of the campaign and he would pitch only one more game for the Red Sox, on April 23, 1946.

Wilson returned to Louisville for the balance of 1946 and all of 1947, then was included in a trade to the Browns that yielded slugging shortstop Vern Stephens and starting pitcher Jack Kramer. But 1948 and 1949 saw Wilson bounce among four organizations—the Browns, Cleveland Indians, Tigers and Athletics—and make ineffective appearances in six total big-league games for the Browns and A's. Finally, in 1950, he was acquired by the Triple-A Seattle Rainiers, managed by Paul Richards. Wilson won 24 games (losing 11) for a sixth-place team and led the Pacific Coast League in strikeouts. His contract was purchased by the Boston Braves at season's end, and Wilson returned to the Major Leagues for good.

Wilson's first All-Star season came in 1954 for the Milwaukee Braves; they had moved from Boston in March 1953. He no-hit the Philadelphia Phillies, 2–0 at Milwaukee County Stadium on June 12 of that season. The 32-year-old right-hander beat future Hall of Famer Robin Roberts in the one-hour and 43-minute contest. Wilson issued two bases on balls (both to Phillies' catcher Smoky Burgess) and struck out six. The no-hitter was the first in the Braves' Milwaukee history. Wilson was named an All-Star in the midst of an 8–2 season in 27 games pitched with three other complete game shutouts for the contending Braves. But he did not get into the 1954 Midsummer classic, an 11–9 loss for his National League squad at Cleveland Municipal Stadium.

On the eve of the 1955 season, Richards, by now both the general manager and field manager of the Baltimore Orioles, purchased Wilson's contract and moved him into the starting rotation. Wilson led the American League in games lost (18) that season (as a team, Baltimore lost 97 games), but he again registered four shutouts and was selected to the AL All-Star team, chosen to play in the July 12, 1955, game at his old home field, County Stadium. But again Wilson did not appear and, again, his team was defeated, with the Senior Circuit winning 6–5 in 12 innings.

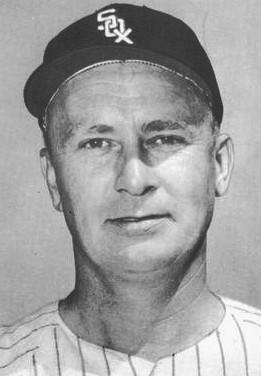
Wilson in 1958

Wilson began 1956 by winning four of his first six decisions in seven starts for Baltimore despite sporting a high (5.03) earned run average. On May 21, Richards traded him to the first-division White Sox, and although he pitched more effectively, he registered only a 9–12 record for Chicago. Nevertheless, Wilson was selected to the 1956 American League All-Star team, and this time he played in the game at Griffith Stadium in Washington, working one inning in the AL's 7–3 loss, allowing two hits and one earned run, although he retired Willie Mays on a called third strike to register the final out.

That set the stage for Wilson's most successful big-league season, with the 1957 White Sox. He won a career-high 15 games (losing eight), and led the American League in shutouts, with five. However, he did not earn a place on the 1957 AL All-Star team. In 1958, the 36-year-old Wilson concluded his 16-season playing career, working in 28 games for the White Sox, 23 in a starting role. In his final MLB game, September 14 against the Washington Senators, he worked 82/3 innings and surrendered five earned runs, but was credited with the victory in a 6–5 Chicago triumph. That season he also continued his skein of errorless games as a pitcher. On June 15, 1955, as an Oriole, he muffed an eighth-inning foul pop-up by the White Sox' Jim Rivera for an error. It was the last miscue he would commit in his career, which spanned 116 games through his 1958 retirement. Wilson posted a career .988 fielding percentage, committing only 4 miscues in 333 total chances.

Altogether, Wilson appeared in 257 Major League games pitched, 217 as a starter. He compiled an 86–89 won-lost mark, with 75 complete games and 19 shutouts. In 1,539 innings pitched he notched 692 strikeouts. Wilson also allowed 1,479 hits, 608 bases on balls and 686 earned runs. His career earned run average was 4.01.

=== As a scout and executive ===
Wilson remained in the game as a scout for the Orioles and Houston Astros. He and scout Jim Russo signed Jim Palmer for the Orioles in 1963. Palmer recalled in a 1996 book that though 13 teams were interested in him, the Orioles scouts set themselves apart with their polite manners. In 1971, Wilson came back to Milwaukee as the director of scouting and player development of the Brewers, a three-year-old expansion team, and following the 1972 season, he succeeded Frank Lane as Milwaukee's general manager. Although Lane was renowned as a trader, Wilson completed a blockbuster transaction of his own with the Phillies on October 31, 1972, acquiring third baseman Don Money in a seven-player deal. Money would play 11 seasons for the Brewers and make four American League All-Star teams. Then, in June 1973, during his first draft as Brewers' general manager, Wilson selected Robin Yount with the club's first pick (third overall). After one season in minor league baseball, Wilson promoted the 18-year-old Yount to the 1974 Brewers, the beginning of a 20-season, Hall of Fame career for the shortstop and center fielder.

But Wilson's stay as general manager in Milwaukee was not a long one. After the 1974 season he returned to California to become executive director of the Major League Baseball Scouting Bureau. He stepped down in 1985 after being stricken with lung cancer and died in Newport Beach at age 64 on September 2, 1986. He was interred at Pacific View Memorial Park.

== See also ==
- List of Major League Baseball no-hitters

Achievements
Preceded by Bobo Holloman	No-hitter pitcher June 12, 1954	Succeeded by Sam Jones
