= Herb Score =

American baseball player (1933–2008)

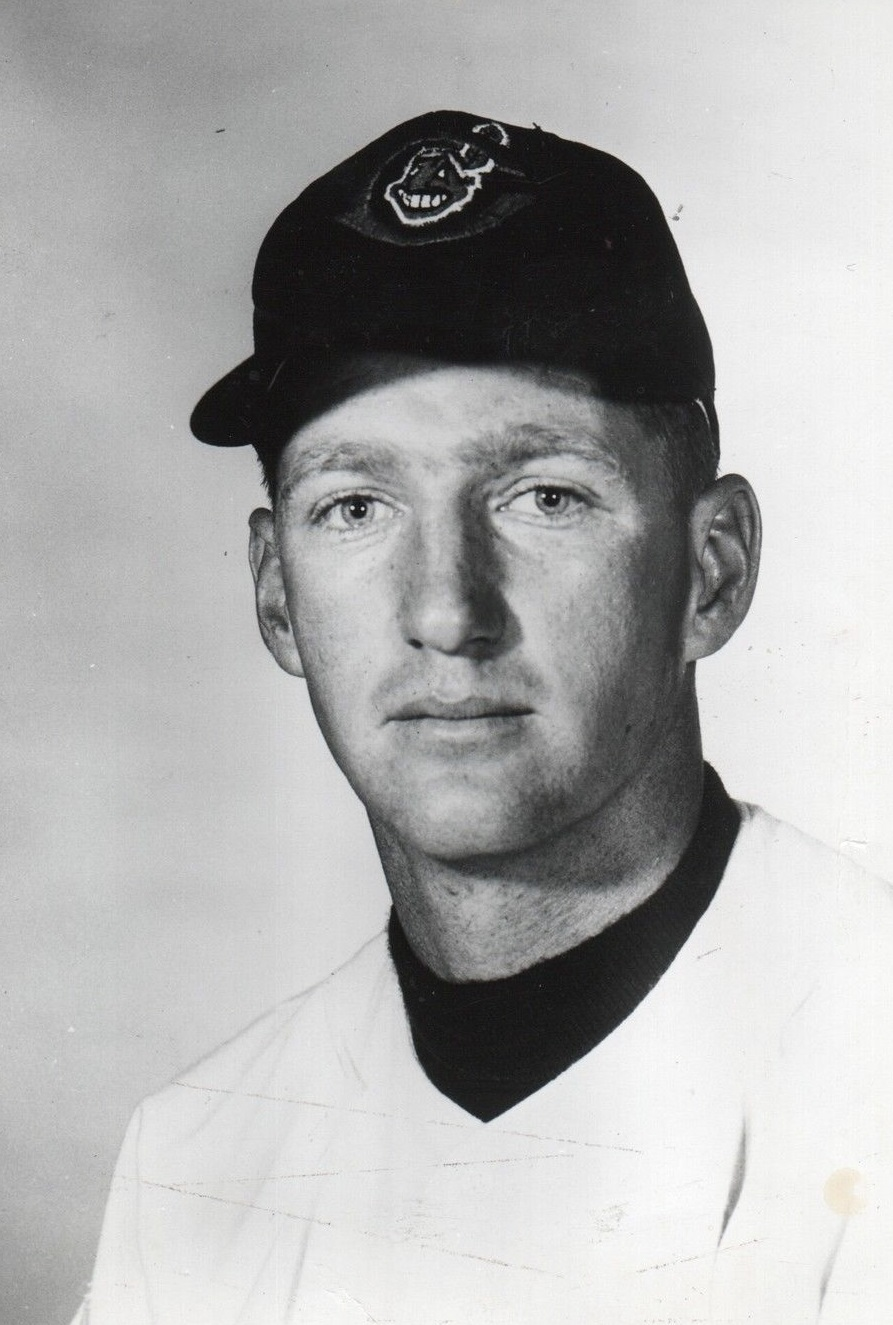
- Score in 1955
- Pitcher
- Born: June 7, 1933; Rosedale, New York, U.S.
- Died: November 11, 2008 (aged 75); Rocky River, Ohio, U.S.
- Batted: Left Threw: Left

MLB debut
- April 15, 1955, for the Cleveland Indians

Last MLB appearance
- May 4, 1962, for the Chicago White Sox

MLB statistics
- Win–loss record: 55–46
- Earned run average: 3.36
- Strikeouts: 837
- Stats at Baseball Reference

Teams
- Cleveland Indians (1955–1959); Chicago White Sox (1960–1962)

Career highlights and awards
- 2× All-Star (1955, 1956); AL Rookie of the Year (1955); 2× AL strikeout leader (1955, 1956); Cleveland Guardians Hall of Fame

Herbert Jude Score (June 7, 1933 – November 11, 2008) was an American professional baseball pitcher and announcer in Major League Baseball (MLB). He pitched for the Cleveland Indians from 1955 through 1959 and the Chicago White Sox from 1960 through 1962. He was the American League (AL) Rookie of the Year in 1955, and an AL All-Star in 1955 and 1956. Due to an on-field injury that occurred in 1957, he retired early as a player in 1962. Score was a television and radio broadcaster for the Cleveland Indians from 1964 through 1997. He was inducted into the Cleveland Indians Hall of Fame in 2006.

== Early life ==
Herb Score was born in Rosedale, New York in 1933. He was given the middle name "Jude" after St. Jude, to whom his mother prayed during her pregnancy. At 3, he was run over by a truck and later had rheumatic fever. As a child, he started playing CYO basketball and baseball at Holy Name of Mary parish in Valley Stream, New York, where he made his First Communion and Confirmation.

As a teenager, he moved with his family to Lake Worth, Florida. In 1952, he threw six no-hitters for the Lake Worth Community High School baseball team, when the school won its only state baseball championship.

On June 7, 1952 (his 19th birthday), he signed a baseball contract with the Cleveland Indians. He was sent to Indianapolis of the American Association where he made 10 pitching starts. In 1953, he moved to Cleveland's Class A affiliate, Reading (Pennsylvania) of the Eastern League. At Reading, he became a roommate and lifetime friend with Rocky Colavito, a near future Cleveland Indians home run hitter and right fielder from the Bronx, New York. For the 1954 season, both were promoted to Triple-A Indianapolis. Score won The Sporting News Minor League Player of the Year Award and began to be referred to as "left-handed Bob Feller".

== MLB playing career ==
=== Cleveland Indians (1955–1959) ===
In 1955, Score came up to the major leagues (with Colavito) as a rookie with the Cleveland Indians at the age of 21. He quickly became one of the top power pitchers in the American League, no small feat on a team that still included Feller, Bob Lemon, and other top pitchers, going 16–10 with a 2.85 earned run average in his first year. He appeared on the cover of Sports Illustrated magazine on May 30, 1955. Score struck out 245 batters in 1955, a major league rookie record that stood until 1984, when it was topped by Dwight Gooden (Score, Gooden, Grover Cleveland Alexander, Don Sutton, Gary Nolan, Kerry Wood, Mark Langston, and Hideo Nomo were the only eight rookie pitchers to top 200 strikeouts in the 20th century). It was the first time in major league history that a regular starting pitcher averaged over one strikeout per inning.

In 1956, Score improved on his rookie campaign, going 20–9 with a 2.53 earned run average and 263 strikeouts, while reducing the number of walks from 154 to 129, and allowed only 5.85 hits per 9 innings, which remained a franchise record until it was broken by Luis Tiant's 5.30 in 1968.

==== Injury from Gil McDougald's line drive ====
On May 7, 1957, during the first inning of a night game against the New York Yankees at Municipal Stadium in Cleveland, Score threw a low fastball to Gil McDougald with Jim Hegan catching. McDougald lined the pitch to the mound and struck Score in the face, breaking Score's facial bones and injuring his eye. The ball caromed to third baseman Al Smith, who threw McDougald out before he rushed to the pitching mound to aid Score. McDougald, seeing Score hit by the baseball and then lying down and injured, also ran immediately to the pitching mound, instead of first base, to help Score. McDougald reportedly vowed to retire if Score permanently lost his sight in one eye as a result of the accident. Score eventually recovered his 20/20 vision, though he missed the rest of the season.

He returned early in the 1958 season. Though many believe he feared being hit by another batted ball, and thus changed his pitching motion, Score rejected that theory. Score would tell Cleveland sportswriter Terry Pluto (for The Curse of Rocky Colavito) that, in 1958, after pitching and winning a few games and feeling better than he'd felt in a long time, he tore a tendon in his arm while pitching on a damp night against the Washington Senators and sat out the rest of the season.

In 1959, he shifted his pitching motion in a bid to avoid another, similar injury. "The reason my motion changed", Score told Pluto, "was because I hurt my elbow, and I overcompensated for it and ended up with some bad habits." As a result of the changes Score made in his pitching delivery, his velocity dropped and he incurred further injuries. Score pitched the full 1959 season, going 9–11 with a 4.71 earned run average and 147 strikeouts.

In the book The Greatest Team Of All Time (Bob Adams, Inc, publisher. 1994), Mickey Mantle picked Score as the toughest American League left-handed pitcher he faced (before the injury). Yogi Berra picked Score for his "Greatest Team Of All Time".

=== Chicago White Sox (1960–1962) ===
Score was traded to the Chicago White Sox by Cleveland on April 18, 1960, for pitcher Barry Latman. Score's roommate, Colavito, was traded to the Detroit Tigers the previous day. Score was reunited on the Chicago team with some former Indians players and manager Al Lopez. Score pitched parts of the following three seasons before retiring. He finished with a major league career record of 55–46, a 3.36 earned run average, and 837 strikeouts over eight seasons in 858 1/3 innings pitched.

== Broadcasting career ==
Score retired from playing baseball in 1962. Beginning in 1964, he was employed as a television and radio play-by-play announcer with the Cleveland Indians for the next 34 years, first on television from 1964 to 1967, and then on radio from 1968 to 1997, the longest career for an Indians play-by-play announcer. Score was revered by the Indians fans for his announcing style, including a low voice and a low-key style, as well as a habit of occasionally mispronouncing the names of players on opposing teams. Score's final Major League Baseball game as an announcer was Game 7 of the 1997 World Series.

== Retirement and death ==
On October 8, 1998, while driving to Florida after being inducted into the Broadcasters Hall of Fame the preceding night, Score was severely injured in a traffic accident. He pulled into the path of a westbound tractor-trailer truck near New Philadelphia, Ohio, and his car was struck in the passenger side. He suffered trauma to his brain, chest, and lungs. The orbital bone around one of his eyes was fractured, as were three ribs and his sternum. He spent over a month in the intensive care unit, and was released from MetroHealth Hospital in mid-December. He was cited for running a stop sign.

He went through a difficult recovery, but managed to throw out the first pitch at the Indians' Opening Day on April 12, 1999. He suffered a stroke in 2002, and died on November 11, 2008, at his home in Rocky River, Ohio, after a lengthy illness. He is interred at Lakewood Park Cemetery in Rocky River. The Indians wore a memorial patch on their uniform during the 2009 season to honor him.

== Awards and honors ==
=== Baseball ===
==== High school ====
- 1952 Florida State Baseball Championship (Lake Worth Community High School)

==== Professional ====
- International League Most Valuable Player Award – 1954
- Sporting News Minor League Player of the Year – 1954
- American League Rookie of the Year – 1955
- Two-time American League All-Star – 1955, 1956
- Cleveland Guardians Hall of Fame – 2006
- Greater Cleveland Sports Hall of Fame (class of 1992)

=== Broadcasting ===
- Cleveland Association of Broadcasters Hall of Fame (class of 1996)
- Cleveland Press Club Journalism Hall of Fame (class of 1998)
- Ohio Broadcasters Hall of Fame (class of 1998)

== See also ==
- List of Major League Baseball annual strikeout leaders
