= 1955 Major League Baseball season =

1955 MLB season
- League: American League (AL); National League (NL)
- Sport: Baseball
- Duration: Regular season: April 11 – September 25, 1955; World Series: September 28 – October 4, 1955
- Games: 154
- Teams: 16 (8 per league)
- TV partner(s): NBC, CBS

Regular season
- Season MVP: AL: Yogi Berra (NYY); NL: Roy Campanella (BRO)
- AL champions: New York Yankees
- AL runners-up: Cleveland Indians
- NL champions: Brooklyn Dodgers
- NL runners-up: Milwaukee Braves

World Series
- Champions: Brooklyn Dodgers
- Runners-up: New York Yankees
- World Series MVP: Johnny Podres (BRO)

MLB seasons
- ← 1954 1956 →

Locations of teams for the 1955–1960 American League seasons
American League
Locations of teams for the 1953–1957 National League seasons
National League

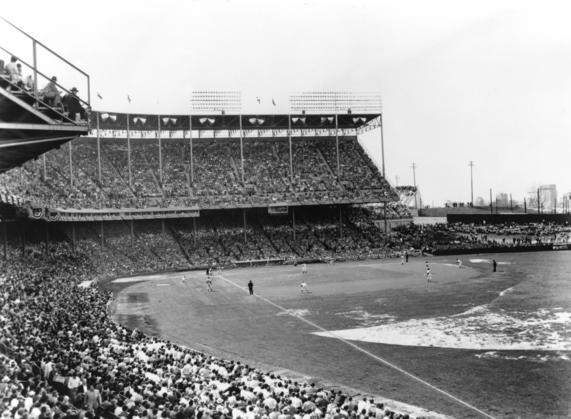
Kansas City Athletics first game in Municipal Stadium, 1955.

The 1955 major league baseball season began on April 11, 1955. The regular season ended on September 25, with the Brooklyn Dodgers and New York Yankees as the regular season champions of the National League and American League, respectively. The postseason began with Game 1 of the 52nd World Series on September 28 and ended with Game 7 on October 4. In the sixth iteration of this Subway Series World Series matchup, The Dodgers defeated the Yankees, four games to three, capturing their first championship in franchise history. This was the first World Series between the two teams to see the Dodgers win over the Yankees. Going into the season, the defending World Series champions were the New York Giants from the 1954 season.

The 22nd All-Star Game was held on July 12 at Milwaukee County Stadium in Milwaukee, Wisconsin, home of the Milwaukee Braves. The National League won, 6–5.

In a continuation of the relocation trend that began in 1953, a team moved for the third consecutive year.

The Athletics moved from Philadelphia to Kansas City, Missouri, leaving Philadelphia as a one-team city.

On April 14, the New York Yankees became the 13th team to break baseball's color line when they called up Elston Howard.

== Schedule ==
The 1955 schedule consisted of 154 games for all teams in the American League and National League, each of which had eight teams. Each team was scheduled to play 22 games against the other seven teams of their respective league. This continued the format put in place since the 1904 season (except for 1919) and would be used until 1961 in the American League and 1962 in the National League.

Opening Day took place on April 11, featuring four teams. The final day of the regular season was on September 25, which saw all sixteen teams play, the first time since 1953. The World Series took place between September 28 and October 4.

== Rule changes ==
The 1955 season saw the following rule changes:

- A 1901 rule regarding a pitcher's necessity to deliver a pitch within 20 seconds of the pitcher taking the rubber was adjusted. Now, pitchers must pitch the ball within 20 seconds of having the ball returned. To enforce this, the third-base umpire used a stopwatch to monitor the time passed. However, this predecessor to the modern-day pitch clock was hardly ever enforced, and it wouldn't be until 68 years later in 2023 that a strictly enforced pitch clock was introduced.
- The catcher's triangle (created by extending the foul lines behind the home plate) was removed. Due to this, the rules on intentional base on balls required change, and so now, the catcher was required to remain behind the batter's box during an intentional walk.
- Rules surrounding lineup card submissions were adjusted to make up for an oversight. When there were obvious errors (such as duplicate names) occurring before a game, umpires were give the right to change said lineup to correct errors.
- Rules regarding catcher interference were amended. Not only was the batter still rewarded first base, but now, any additional runners on base, regardless of whether or not there was a runner on the preceding base was occupied, were also rewarded an extra base.
- The use of laminated bats was approved.
- A new rule prohibiting anyone maintaining ownership interests in multiple teams was approved by club owners.
- A few requests by players regarding player-team relations were approved:
  - The deadline to issue player contracts was moved up from February 1 to January 15.
  - Teams will serve dinner to players on trains after night games.
  - When players were housed in private homes during spring training, they will be compensated with the existing hotel rate.
- To allow major-league teams to select players from minor-league team rosters at the end of the season, major-league teams would pay various amounts to minor-league teams—Class-B at $3,500 (equivalent to $42,100 in 2025), Class-C at $3,000 (equivalent to $36,100 in 2025), and Class-D at $2,500 (equivalent to $30,000 in 2025)
  - In addition, minor-league teams now had the cost of spring training, including transportation, as well as manager's salary underwritten by their respective major-league teams affiliate.
- Teams were now barred from signing a college player who had finished freshman year, was under 21, or, given he dropped out following freshman year, his class had not yet graduated.
- Rules regarding balks were amended; if a ball is put in play and all runners on base advance at least one base, the play overrides the balk call.
- If a bases on balls occurs due to a wild pitch, and the baserunners take an additional base than what is already guaranteed by a bases on balls, the pitcher is charged with an error.

== Teams ==
League	Team	City	Ballpark	Capacity	Manager
American League	Baltimore Orioles	Baltimore, Maryland	Baltimore Memorial Stadium	47,866	Paul Richards
American League	Boston Red Sox	Boston, Massachusetts	Fenway Park	34,824	Pinky Higgins
American League	Chicago White Sox	Chicago, Illinois	Comiskey Park	46,550	Marty Marion
American League	Cleveland Indians	Cleveland, Ohio	Cleveland Stadium	73,811	Al López
American League	Detroit Tigers	Detroit, Michigan	Briggs Stadium	58,000	Bucky Harris
American League	Kansas City Athletics	Kansas City, Missouri	Municipal Stadium	30,296	Lou Boudreau
American League	New York Yankees	New York, New York	Yankee Stadium	67,000	Casey Stengel
American League	Washington Senators	Washington, D.C.	Griffith Stadium	29,023	Chuck Dressen
National League	Brooklyn Dodgers	New York, New York	Ebbets Field	31,902	Walter Alston
National League	Chicago Cubs	Chicago, Illinois	Wrigley Field	36,755	Stan Hack
National League	Cincinnati Redlegs	Cincinnati, Ohio	Crosley Field	29,439	Birdie Tebbetts
National League	Milwaukee Braves	Milwaukee, Wisconsin	Milwaukee County Stadium	44,091	Charlie Grimm
National League	New York Giants	New York, New York	Polo Grounds	54,500	Leo Durocher
National League	Philadelphia Phillies	Philadelphia, Pennsylvania	Connie Mack Stadium	33,166	Mayo Smith
National League	Pittsburgh Pirates	Pittsburgh, Pennsylvania	Forbes Field	34,249	Fred Haney
National League	St. Louis Cardinals	St. Louis, Missouri	Busch Stadium	30,500	Eddie Stanky
National League	St. Louis Cardinals	St. Louis, Missouri	Busch Stadium	30,500	Harry Walker

== Standings ==
=== American League ===
American League
Team	W	L	Pct.	GB	Home	Road
New York Yankees	96	58	.623	—	52‍–‍25	44‍–‍33
Cleveland Indians	93	61	.604	3	49‍–‍28	44‍–‍33
Chicago White Sox	91	63	.591	5	49‍–‍28	42‍–‍35
Boston Red Sox	84	70	.545	12	47‍–‍31	37‍–‍39
Detroit Tigers	79	75	.513	17	46‍–‍31	33‍–‍44
Kansas City Athletics	63	91	.409	33	33‍–‍43	30‍–‍48
Baltimore Orioles	57	97	.370	39	30‍–‍47	27‍–‍50
Washington Senators	53	101	.344	43	28‍–‍49	25‍–‍52

=== National League ===
National League
Team	W	L	Pct.	GB	Home	Road
Brooklyn Dodgers	98	55	.641	—	56‍–‍21	42‍–‍34
Milwaukee Braves	85	69	.552	13½	46‍–‍31	39‍–‍38
New York Giants	80	74	.519	18½	44‍–‍35	36‍–‍39
Philadelphia Phillies	77	77	.500	21½	46‍–‍31	31‍–‍46
Cincinnati Redlegs	75	79	.487	23½	46‍–‍31	29‍–‍48
Chicago Cubs	72	81	.471	26	43‍–‍33	29‍–‍48
St. Louis Cardinals	68	86	.442	30½	41‍–‍36	27‍–‍50
Pittsburgh Pirates	60	94	.390	38½	36‍–‍39	24‍–‍55

=== Tie games ===
3 tie games (2 in AL, 1 in NL), which are not factored into winning percentage or games behind (and were often replayed again) occurred throughout the season.

==== American League ====
The Baltimore Orioles had two tie games. The Chicago White Sox and Kansas City Athletics had one tie game each.

- June 25, Kansas City Athletics vs. Baltimore Orioles, tied at 3 after top of the 11th inning due to rain.
- August 7, Chicago White Sox vs. Baltimore Orioles, tied at 2 after 3 batters in the top of the 13th inning due to rain.

==== National League ====
The Brooklyn Dodgers and Chicago Cubs had one tie game each.

- September 10, Brooklyn Dodgers vs. Chicago Cubs, tied at 3 after a shortened game of six innings following a 40 minute rain delay.

== Postseason ==
The postseason began on September 28 and ended on October 4 with the Brooklyn Dodgers defeating the New York Yankees in the 1955 World Series in seven games.

=== Bracket ===
World Series
AL	New York Yankees	3
NL	Brooklyn Dodgers	4

== Managerial changes ==
=== Off-season ===
Team	Former Manager	New Manager
Baltimore Orioles	Jimmy Dykes	Paul Richards
Boston Red Sox	Lou Boudreau	Pinky Higgins
Detroit Tigers	Fred Hutchinson	Bucky Harris
Kansas City Athletics	Eddie Joost	Lou Boudreau
Philadelphia Phillies	Terry Moore	Mayo Smith
Washington Senators	Bucky Harris	Chuck Dressen

=== In-season ===
Team	Former Manager	New Manager
St. Louis Cardinals	Eddie Stanky	Harry Walker

== League leaders ==
=== American League ===
Hitting leaders
Stat	Player	Total
AVG	Al Kaline (DET)	.340
OPS	Mickey Mantle (NYY)	1.042
HR	Mickey Mantle (NYY)	37
RBI	Ray Boone (DET); Jackie Jensen (BOS)	116
R	Al Smith (CLE)	123
H	Al Kaline (DET)	200
SB	Jim Rivera (CWS)	25

Pitching leaders
Stat	Player	Total
W	Whitey Ford (NYY); Bob Lemon (CLE); Frank Sullivan (BOS)	18
L	Jim Wilson (BAL)	18
ERA	Billy Pierce (CWS)	1.97
K	Herb Score (CLE)	245
IP	Frank Sullivan (BOS)	260.0
SV	Ray Narleski (CLE)	19
WHIP	Billy Pierce (CWS)	1.099

=== National League ===
Hitting leaders
Stat	Player	Total
AVG	Richie Ashburn (PHI)	.338
OPS	Willie Mays (NYG)	1.059
HR	Willie Mays (NYG)	51
RBI	Duke Snider (BRO)	136
R	Duke Snider (BRO)	126
H	Ted Kluszewski (CIN)	192
SB	Bill Bruton (MIL)	25

Pitching leaders
Stat	Player	Total
W	Robin Roberts (PHI)	23
L	Sam Jones (CHC)	20
ERA	Bob Friend (PIT)	2.83
K	Sam Jones (CHC)	198
IP	Robin Roberts (PHI)	305.0
SV	Jack Meyer (PHI)	16
WHIP	Don Newcombe (BRO)	1.113

== Milestones ==
=== Batters ===
- Norm Zauchin (BOS):
  - Became the seventh player to hit at least 10 runs batted in (RBI) in a single game as a part of the Washington Senators, hitting 10 against the Washington Senators on May 27.
- Willie Mays (NYG):
  - Tied a Major League record by becoming the fifth player and third National League player to hit home runs in six consecutive games between August 28 and September 1.

=== Pitchers ===
==== No-hitters ====
- Sam Jones (CHC):
  - Jones threw his first career no-hitter and seventh no-hitter in franchise history, by defeating the Pittsburgh Pirates 4–0 on May 12. Jones walked seven and struck out six.

==== Other pitching accomplishments ====
- Herb Score (CLE):
  - Breaks a rookie record of 235 strikeouts previously set by Grover Cleveland Alexander in 1911 on September 14. He would finish the season with 245 strikeouts.

== Awards and honors ==
=== Regular season ===
Baseball Writers' Association of America Awards
BBWAA Award	National League	American League
Rookie of the Year	Bill Virdon (STL)	Herb Score (CLE)
Most Valuable Player	Roy Campanella (BRO)	Yogi Berra (NYY)
Babe Ruth Award (World Series MVP)	Johnny Podres (BRO)	—

=== Other awards ===
- Sport Magazine's World Series Most Valuable Player Award: Johnny Podres (BRO)

The Sporting News Awards
Award	National League	American League
Player of the Year	Duke Snider (BRO)	—
Pitcher of the Year	Robin Roberts (PHI)	Whitey Ford (NYY)
Rookie of the Year	Bill Virdon (STL)	Herb Score (CLE)
Manager of the Year	Walter Alston (BRO)	—
Executive of the Year	Walter O'Malley (BRO)	—

=== Baseball Hall of Fame ===
- Joe DiMaggio
- Ted Lyons
- Dazzy Vance
- Gabby Hartnett
- Frank Baker
- Ray Schalk

== Home field attendance ==
Team name	Wins	%±	Home attendance	%±	Per game
Milwaukee Braves	85	−4.5%	2,005,836	−5.9%	26,050
New York Yankees	96	−6.8%	1,490,138	1.0%	19,352
Kansas City Athletics	63	23.5%	1,393,054	357.2%	18,330
Cleveland Indians	93	−16.2%	1,221,780	−8.5%	15,867
Boston Red Sox	84	21.7%	1,203,200	29.2%	15,426
Detroit Tigers	79	16.2%	1,181,838	9.4%	15,349
Chicago White Sox	91	−3.2%	1,175,684	−4.5%	15,269
Brooklyn Dodgers	98	6.5%	1,033,589	1.3%	13,423
Philadelphia Phillies	77	2.7%	922,886	24.9%	11,986
Chicago Cubs	72	12.5%	875,800	17.1%	11,374
Baltimore Orioles	57	5.6%	852,039	−19.7%	10,785
St. Louis Cardinals	68	−5.6%	849,130	−18.3%	11,028
New York Giants	80	−17.5%	824,112	−28.7%	10,432
Cincinnati Redlegs	75	1.4%	693,662	−1.5%	9,009
Pittsburgh Pirates	60	13.2%	469,397	−1.3%	6,259
Washington Senators	53	−19.7%	425,238	−15.6%	5,523

== Venues ==
With the relocation of the Philadelphia Athletics from Philadelphia, Pennsylvania to Kansas City, Missouri as the Kansas City Athletics, they leave Connie Mack Stadium (where they played 46 seasons) and move into Municipal Stadium. They would go on to play there for 13 seasons through 1967, before again relocating.

== Media ==
=== Television ===
The Game of the Week moved from ABC to CBS (the rights were actually set up through the Falstaff Brewing Corporation).

The All-Star Game and World Series aired on NBC.

== See also ==
- 1955 in baseball (Events, Births, Deaths)
- 1955 Nippon Professional Baseball season
