= 1958 Kansas City Athletics season =

1958 Kansas City Athletics
- League: American League
- Ballpark: Municipal Stadium
- City: Kansas City, Missouri
- Record: 73–81 (.474)
- League place: 7th
- Owners: Arnold Johnson
- General managers: George Selkirk
- Managers: Harry Craft
- Radio: KMBC (Merle Harmon, Ed Edwards)

The 1958 Kansas City Athletics season was the team's fourth in Kansas City and the 58th in the American League. The season involved the A's finishing seventh in the American League with a record of 73 wins and 81 losses, 19 games behind the World Champion New York Yankees.

== Offseason ==
- November 20, 1957: Billy Martin, Mickey McDermott, Tom Morgan, Lou Skizas, Tim Thompson, and Gus Zernial were traded by the Athletics to the Detroit Tigers for Bill Tuttle, Jim Small, Duke Maas, John Tsitouris, Frank House, and Kent Hadley, and a player to be named later. The Tigers completed the deal by sending Jim McManus to the Athletics on April 3, 1958.
- December 2, 1957: Harry Chiti was drafted by the Athletics from the New York Yankees in the 1957 rule 5 draft.
- December 2, 1957: Ramón Conde was drafted by the Athletics from the San Francisco Giants in the 1957 minor league draft.

== Regular season ==
=== Season standings ===
American League
Team	W	L	Pct.	GB	Home	Road
New York Yankees	92	62	.597	—	44‍–‍33	48‍–‍29
Chicago White Sox	82	72	.532	10	47‍–‍30	35‍–‍42
Boston Red Sox	79	75	.513	13	49‍–‍28	30‍–‍47
Cleveland Indians	77	76	.503	14½	42‍–‍34	35‍–‍42
Detroit Tigers	77	77	.500	15	43‍–‍34	34‍–‍43
Baltimore Orioles	74	79	.484	17½	46‍–‍31	28‍–‍48
Kansas City Athletics	73	81	.474	19	43‍–‍34	30‍–‍47
Washington Senators	61	93	.396	31	33‍–‍44	28‍–‍49

=== Record vs. opponents ===
1958 American League record Sources:
Team	BAL	BOS	CWS	CLE	DET	KCA	NYY	WSH
Baltimore	—	10–12	9–13–1	10–11	10–12	12–10	8–14	15–7
Boston	12–10	—	10–12	12–10	10–12	12–10	9–13–1	14–8
Chicago	13–9–1	12–10	—	12–10	10–12	12–10	7–15	16–6
Cleveland	11–10	10–12	10–12	—	14–8	10–12	7–15	15–7
Detroit	12–10	12–10	12–10	8–14	—	12–10	12–10	9–13
Kansas City	10–12	10–12	10–12	12–10	10–12	—	9–13	12–10–2
New York	14–8	13–9–1	15–7	15–7	10–12	13–9	—	12–10
Washington	7–15	8–14	6–16	7–15	13–9	10–12–2	10–12	—

=== Notable transactions ===
- April 15, 1958: Ramón Conde was acquired from the Athletics by the Philadelphia Phillies.
- May 14, 1958: Whitey Herzog was purchased by the Athletics from the Washington Senators.
- June 12, 1958: Billy Hunter was traded by the Athletics to the Cleveland Indians for Chico Carrasquel.
- June 15, 1958: Woodie Held and Vic Power were traded by the Athletics to the Cleveland Indians for Roger Maris, Dick Tomanek and Preston Ward.

=== Roster ===
1958 Kansas City Athletics
Roster
Pitchers: 24 Wally Burnette; 16 Glenn Cox; 6,30 Walt Craddock; 22,28 Bud Daley; 24 Bob Davis; 29 Murry Dickson; 14,15 Carl Duser; 31 Ned Garver; 37 Tom Gorman; 34 Bob Grim; 38 Ray Herbert; 27 Ken Johnson; 20 Alex Kellner; 34 Duke Maas; 16 Howie Reed; 26 Ralph Terry; 15 Dick Tomanek; 23 Virgil Trucks; 20 John Tsitouris; 21 Jack Urban	Catchers: 8,17 Harry Chiti; 12,36 Frank House; Infielders: 11 Mike Baxes; 1 Chico Carrasquel; 2 Joe DeMaestri; 4 Milt Graff; 18 Kent Hadley; 1 Billy Hunter; 4 Lou Klimchock; 10 Héctor López; 7 Vic Power; 5 Harry Simpson; 9 Hal Smith; 7 Preston Ward	Outfielders: 33 Bob Cerv; 5 Woodie Held; 22 Whitey Herzog; 35 Roger Maris; 32 Bob Martyn; 3,35 Dave Melton; 35 Jim Small; 13 Bill Tuttle	Manager: 41 Harry Craft; Coaches: 40 Spud Chandler; 39 Don Heffner; 42 Bob Swift

== Player stats ==
= Indicates team leader

=== Batting ===
==== Starters by position ====
Note: Pos = Position; G = Games played; AB = At bats; H = Hits; Avg. = Batting average; HR = Home runs; RBI = Runs batted in

Pos	Player	G	AB	H	Avg.	HR	RBI
C	Harry Chiti	103	295	79	.268	9	44
1B	Vic Power	52	205	62	.302	4	27
2B	Héctor López	151	564	147	.261	17	73
SS	Joe DeMaestri	139	442	97	.219	6	38
3B	Hal W. Smith	99	315	86	.273	5	46
LF	Bob Cerv	141	515	157	.305	38	104
CF	Bill Tuttle	148	511	118	.231	11	51
RF	Roger Maris	99	401	99	.247	19	53

==== Other batters ====
Note: G = Games played; AB = At bats; H = Hits; Avg. = Batting average; HR = Home runs; RBI = Runs batted in

Player	G	AB	H	Avg.	HR	RBI
Preston Ward	81	268	68	.254	6	24
Mike Baxes	73	231	49	.212	0	8
Bob Martyn	95	226	59	.261	2	23
Harry Simpson	78	212	56	.264	7	27
Frank House	76	202	51	.252	4	24
Chico Carrasquel	59	160	34	.213	2	13
Woodie Held	47	131	28	.214	4	16
Whitey Herzog	88	96	23	.240	0	9
Billy Hunter	22	58	9	.155	2	11
Kent Hadley	3	11	2	.182	0	0
Lou Klimchock	2	10	2	.200	1	1
Dave Melton	9	6	0	.000	0	0
Jim Small	2	4	0	.000	0	0
Milt Graff	5	1	0	.000	0	0

=== Pitching ===
==== Starting pitchers ====
Note: G = Games pitched; IP = Innings pitched; W = Wins; L = Losses; ERA = Earned run average; SO = Strikeouts

Player	G	IP	W	L	ERA	SO
Ralph Terry	40	216.2	11	13	4.24	134
Ned Garver	31	201.0	12	11	4.03	72
Jack Urban	30	132.0	8	11	5.93	54
Alex Kellner	7	33.2	0	2	5.88	22
John Tsitouris	1	3.0	0	0	3.00	1

==== Other pitchers ====
Note: G = Games pitched; IP = Innings pitched; W = Wins; L = Losses; ERA = Earned run average; SO = Strikeouts

Player	G	IP	W	L	ERA	SO
Ray Herbert	42	175.0	8	8	3.50	108
Bob Grim	26	113.2	7	6	3.56	54
Murry Dickson	27	99.0	9	5	3.27	46
Bud Daley	26	70.2	3	2	3.31	39
Duke Maas	10	55.1	4	5	3.90	19
Bob Davis	8	31.0	0	4	7.84	22
Wally Burnette	12	28.1	1	1	3.49	11
Howie Reed	3	10.1	1	0	0.87	5

==== Relief pitchers ====
Note: G = Games pitched; W = Wins; L = Losses; SV = Saves; ERA = Earned run average; SO = Strikeouts

Player	G	W	L	SV	ERA	SO
Tom Gorman	50	4	4	8	3.51	44
Dick Tomanek	36	5	5	5	3.61	50
Walt Craddock	23	0	3	0	5.89	22
Virgil Trucks	16	0	1	2	2.05	15
Glenn Cox	2	0	0	0	9.82	1
Ken Johnson	2	0	0	0	27.00	1
Carl Duser	1	0	0	0	4.50	0

== Farm system ==
Level	Team	League	Manager
AAA	Buffalo Bisons	International League	Phil Cavarretta
AA	Little Rock Travelers	Southern Association	Les Peden
A	Albany Senators	Eastern League	Al Evans
B	Rochester/Winona A's	Illinois–Indiana–Iowa League	Burl Storie and Lew Krausse, Sr.
C	Pocatello A's	Pioneer League	Billy Capps
D	Selma Cloverleafs	Alabama–Florida League	Tommy Giordano
D	Grand Island Athletics	Nebraska State League	Art Mazmanian
D	Plainview Athletics	Sophomore League	Vince Plumbo

Rochester franchise moved to Winona, June 29, 1958
