= 1958 Detroit Tigers season =

Major League Baseball season

1958 Detroit Tigers
- League: American League
- Ballpark: Briggs Stadium
- City: Detroit, Michigan
- Record: 77–77 (.500)
- League place: 5th
- Owners: Fred Knorr, John Fetzer
- General managers: John McHale
- Managers: Jack Tighe, Bill Norman
- Television: WJBK
- Radio: WKMH (Van Patrick, Mel Ott)

The 1958 Detroit Tigers season was a season in American baseball. The team finished fifth in the American League with a record of 77–77, 15 games behind the New York Yankees.

== Offseason ==
- November 20, 1957: Bill Tuttle, Jim Small, Duke Maas, John Tsitouris, Frank House, Kent Hadley and a player to be named later were traded by the Tigers to the Kansas City Athletics for Billy Martin, Mickey McDermott, Tom Morgan, Lou Skizas, Tim Thompson, and Gus Zernial. The Tigers completed the deal by sending Jim McManus to the Athletics on April 3.
- December 11, 1957: Dave Philley was purchased from the Tigers by the Philadelphia Phillies.
- February 18, 1958: Jay Porter and Hal Woodeshick were traded by the Tigers to the Cleveland Indians for Hank Aguirre and Jim Hegan.
- March 27, 1958: Pete Wojey and $20,000 were traded by the Tigers to the Cleveland Indians for Vito Valentinetti and Milt Bolling.

== Regular season ==
=== Season standings ===
American League
Team	W	L	Pct.	GB	Home	Road
New York Yankees	92	62	.597	—	44‍–‍33	48‍–‍29
Chicago White Sox	82	72	.532	10	47‍–‍30	35‍–‍42
Boston Red Sox	79	75	.513	13	49‍–‍28	30‍–‍47
Cleveland Indians	77	76	.503	14½	42‍–‍34	35‍–‍42
Detroit Tigers	77	77	.500	15	43‍–‍34	34‍–‍43
Baltimore Orioles	74	79	.484	17½	46‍–‍31	28‍–‍48
Kansas City Athletics	73	81	.474	19	43‍–‍34	30‍–‍47
Washington Senators	61	93	.396	31	33‍–‍44	28‍–‍49

=== Record vs. opponents ===
1958 American League record Sources:
Team	BAL	BOS	CWS	CLE	DET	KCA	NYY	WSH
Baltimore	—	10–12	9–13–1	10–11	10–12	12–10	8–14	15–7
Boston	12–10	—	10–12	12–10	10–12	12–10	9–13–1	14–8
Chicago	13–9–1	12–10	—	12–10	10–12	12–10	7–15	16–6
Cleveland	11–10	10–12	10–12	—	14–8	10–12	7–15	15–7
Detroit	12–10	12–10	12–10	8–14	—	12–10	12–10	9–13
Kansas City	10–12	10–12	10–12	12–10	10–12	—	9–13	12–10–2
New York	14–8	13–9–1	15–7	15–7	10–12	13–9	—	12–10
Washington	7–15	8–14	6–16	7–15	13–9	10–12–2	10–12	—

=== Notable transactions ===
- June 15, 1958: Ray Boone and Bob Shaw were traded by the Tigers to the Chicago White Sox for Bill Fischer and Tito Francona.
- June 23, 1958: Vito Valentinetti was traded by the Tigers to the Washington Senators for Al Cicotte.
- June 30, 1958: Mickey Lolich was signed as an amateur free agent by the Tigers.

=== Roster ===
1958 Detroit Tigers
Roster
Pitchers: 30,42 Hank Aguirre; 14 Jim Bunning; 25 Al Cicotte; 19 Bill Fischer; 21 Paul Foytack; 44 Billy Hoeft; 17 Frank Lary; 20 Don Lee; 20 Mickey McDermott; 37 Herb Moford; 18 Tom Morgan; 27 Joe Presko; 25 Bob Shaw; 19 Lou Sleater; 24 George Spencer; 26 George Susce; 28 Vito Valentinetti; 20 Herm Wehmeier	Catchers: 19 Jack Feller; 15 Jim Hegan; 12 Charley Lau; 12 Tim Thompson; 10 Red Wilson; Infielders: 16 Reno Bertoia; 2 Frank Bolling; 23 Milt Bolling; 8 Ray Boone; 24 Steve Boros; 5 Gail Harris; 1 Billy Martin; 23,45 Coot Veal; 22 Ozzie Virgil	Outfielders: 35 George Alusik; 8 Tito Francona; 3 Johnny Groth; 27 Bob Hazle; 6 Al Kaline; 7 Harvey Kuenn; 4 Charlie Maxwell; 22 Lou Skizas; 29 Bill Taylor; 15 George Thomas; 9 Gus Zernial; Other batters: 47 Bobo Osborne	Manager: 29 Bill Norman; 35 Jack Tighe; Coaches: 31 Tommy Henrich; 34 Billy Hitchcock; 33 Willis Hudlin; 32 Don Lund

== Player stats ==
= Indicates team leader

=== Batting ===
==== Starters by position ====
Note: Pos = Position; G = Games played; AB = At bats; H = Hits; Avg. = Batting average; HR = Home runs; RBI = Runs batted in

Pos	Player	G	AB	H	Avg.	HR	RBI
C	Red Wilson	103	298	89	.299	3	29
1B	Gail Harris	134	451	123	.273	20	82
2B	Frank Bolling	154	610	164	.269	14	75
SS	Billy Martin	131	498	127	.255	7	42
3B	Reno Bertoia	86	240	56	.233	6	27
LF	Charlie Maxwell	131	397	108	.272	13	65
CF	Harvey Kuenn	139	561	179	.319	8	54
RF	Al Kaline	146	543	170	.313	16	85

==== Other batters ====
Note: G = Games played; AB = At bats; H = Hits; Avg. = Batting average; HR = Home runs; RBI = Runs batted in

Player	G	AB	H	Avg.	HR	RBI
Coot Veal	58	207	53	.256	0	16
Ozzie Virgil Sr.	49	193	47	.244	3	19
Johnny Groth	88	146	41	.281	2	11
Jim Hegan	45	130	25	.192	1	7
Gus Zernial	66	124	40	.323	5	23
Ray Boone	39	114	27	.237	6	20
Tito Francona	45	69	17	.246	0	10
Charley Lau	30	68	10	.147	0	6
Bob Hazle	43	58	14	.241	2	5
Lou Skizas	23	33	8	.242	1	2
Milt Bolling	24	31	6	.194	0	0
Bill Taylor	8	8	3	.375	0	1
Tim Thompson	4	6	1	.167	0	0
George Alusik	2	2	0	.000	0	0
Steve Boros	6	2	0	.000	0	0
Bobo Osborne	2	2	0	.000	0	0
Jack Feller	1	0	0	----	0	0
George Thomas	1	0	0	----	0	0

=== Pitching ===
==== Starting pitchers ====
Note: G = Games pitched; IP = Innings pitched; W = Wins; L = Losses; ERA = Earned run average; SO = Strikeouts

Player	G	IP	W	L	ERA	SO
Frank Lary	39	260.1	16	15	2.90	131
Paul Foytack	39	230.0	15	13	3.44	135
Jim Bunning	35	219.2	14	12	3.52	177

==== Other pitchers ====
Note: G = Games pitched; IP = Innings pitched; W = Wins; L = Losses; ERA = Earned run average; SO = Strikeouts

Player	G	IP	W	L	ERA	SO
Billy Hoeft	36	143.0	10	9	4.15	94
Herb Moford	25	109.2	4	9	3.61	58
George Susce	27	90.2	4	3	3.67	42
Al Cicotte	14	43.0	3	1	3.56	21
Bob Shaw	11	26.2	1	2	5.06	17
Herm Wehmeier	7	22.2	1	0	2.38	11

==== Relief pitchers ====
Note: G = Games pitched; W = Wins; L = Losses; SV = Saves; ERA = Earned run average; SO = Strikeouts

Player	G	W	L	SV	ERA	SO
Hank Aguirre	44	3	4	5	3.75	38
Tom Morgan	39	2	5	1	3.16	32
Bill Fischer	22	2	4	2	7.63	16
Vito Valentinetti	15	1	0	2	3.38	10
Joe Presko	7	0	0	2	3.38	6
George Spencer	7	1	0	0	2.70	5
Lou Sleater	4	0	0	0	6.75	4
Mickey McDermott	2	0	0	0	9.00	0
Don Lee	1	0	0	0	9.00	0

== Farm system ==
Level	Team	League	Manager
AAA	Charleston Senators	American Association	Bill Norman and Bill Adair
AA	Birmingham Barons	Southern Association	Cal Ermer
A	Lancaster Red Roses	Eastern League	Johnny Pesky
A	Augusta Tigers	Sally League	Bill Adair, Stan Charnofsky and Wayne Blackburn
B	Durham Bulls	Carolina League	Chuck Kress
C	Idaho Falls Russets	Pioneer League	Al Lakeman
D	Montgomery Rebels	Alabama–Florida League	Schoolboy Rowe and Neil Berry
D	Valdosta Tigers	Georgia–Florida League	Stubby Overmire
D	Decatur Commodores	Midwest League	Frank Carswell
D	Erie Sailors	New York–Penn League	Steve Gromek

LEAGUE CHAMPIONS: Birmingham, Valdosta
