= 1958 New York Yankees season =

Season for the Major League Baseball team the New York Yankees

1958 New York Yankees
- World Series champions American League champions
- League: American League
- Ballpark: Yankee Stadium
- City: New York City
- Record: 92–62 (.597)
- League place: 1st
- Owners: Dan Topping and Del Webb
- General managers: George Weiss
- Managers: Casey Stengel
- Television: WPIX (Mel Allen, Red Barber, Phil Rizzuto)
- Radio: WMGM (Mel Allen, Red Barber, Phil Rizzuto)

The 1958 New York Yankees season was the 56th season for the team. The team finished with a record of 92–62, winning their 24th pennant, finishing 10 games ahead of the Chicago White Sox. In the World Series, they defeated the Milwaukee Braves in 7 games. New York was managed by Casey Stengel. The Yankees played their home games at Yankee Stadium. In 1958, the Yankees became New York City's only professional baseball team after the Brooklyn Dodgers moved to Los Angeles and the New York Giants left for San Francisco. The Yankees would hold this distinction until 1962, when the New York Mets began play.

== Offseason ==
- December 2, 1957: Harry Chiti was drafted from the Yankees by the Kansas City Athletics in the 1957 rule 5 draft.
- Prior to 1958 season: Rich Barry was signed as an amateur free agent by the Yankees.

== Regular season ==
=== Season standings ===
American League
Team	W	L	Pct.	GB	Home	Road
New York Yankees	92	62	.597	—	44‍–‍33	48‍–‍29
Chicago White Sox	82	72	.532	10	47‍–‍30	35‍–‍42
Boston Red Sox	79	75	.513	13	49‍–‍28	30‍–‍47
Cleveland Indians	77	76	.503	14½	42‍–‍34	35‍–‍42
Detroit Tigers	77	77	.500	15	43‍–‍34	34‍–‍43
Baltimore Orioles	74	79	.484	17½	46‍–‍31	28‍–‍48
Kansas City Athletics	73	81	.474	19	43‍–‍34	30‍–‍47
Washington Senators	61	93	.396	31	33‍–‍44	28‍–‍49

=== Record vs. opponents ===
1958 American League record Sources:
Team	BAL	BOS	CWS	CLE	DET	KCA	NYY	WSH
Baltimore	—	10–12	9–13–1	10–11	10–12	12–10	8–14	15–7
Boston	12–10	—	10–12	12–10	10–12	12–10	9–13–1	14–8
Chicago	13–9–1	12–10	—	12–10	10–12	12–10	7–15	16–6
Cleveland	11–10	10–12	10–12	—	14–8	10–12	7–15	15–7
Detroit	12–10	12–10	12–10	8–14	—	12–10	12–10	9–13
Kansas City	10–12	10–12	10–12	12–10	10–12	—	9–13	12–10–2
New York	14–8	13–9–1	15–7	15–7	10–12	13–9	—	12–10
Washington	7–15	8–14	6–16	7–15	13–9	10–12–2	10–12	—

=== Notable transactions ===
- May 14, 1958: Al Cicotte was purchased from the Yankees by the Washington Senators.

=== Roster ===
1958 New York Yankees
Roster
Pitchers: 23 Murry Dickson; 28 Art Ditmar; 26 Ryne Duren; 16 Whitey Ford; 55 Bob Grim; 27 Johnny James; 53 Johnny Kucks; 18 Don Larsen; 24 Duke Maas; 21 Sal Maglie; 55 Zach Monroe; 30 Bobby Shantz; 47 Tom Sturdivant; 21 Virgil Trucks; 19 Bob Turley	Catchers: 8 Yogi Berra; 32 Elston Howard; 22 Darrell Johnson; Infielders: 29 Fritz Brickell; 6 Andy Carey; 10 Tony Kubek; 11 Jerry Lumpe; 12 Gil McDougald; 1 Bobby Richardson; 14 Bill Skowron; 20 Marv Throneberry	Outfielders: 9 Hank Bauer; 27 Bobby Del Greco; 7 Mickey Mantle; 25 Norm Siebern; 36 Harry Simpson; 17 Enos Slaughter	Manager: 37 Casey Stengel; Coaches: 2 Frankie Crosetti; 35 Ralph Houk; 33 Charlie Keller; 31 Jim Turner

== Player stats ==
= Indicates team leader

= Indicates league leader

=== Batting ===
==== Starters by position ====
Note: Pos = Position; G = Games played; AB = At bats; H = Hits; Avg. = Batting average; HR = Home runs; RBI = Runs batted in

Pos	Player	G	AB	H	Avg.	HR	RBI
C	Yogi Berra	122	433	115	.266	22	90
1B	Bill Skowron	126	465	127	.273	14	73
2B	Gil McDougald	138	503	126	.250	14	65
3B	Andy Carey	102	315	90	.286	12	45
SS	Tony Kubek	138	559	148	.265	2	48
LF	Norm Siebern	134	460	138	.300	14	55
CF	Mickey Mantle	150	519	158	.304	42	97
RF	Hank Bauer	128	462	121	.268	12	50

==== Other batters ====
Note: G = Games played; AB = At bats; H = Hits; Avg. = Batting average; HR = Home runs; RBI = Runs batted in

Player	G	AB	H	Avg.	HR	RBI
Elston Howard	103	376	118	.314	11	66
Jerry Lumpe	81	232	59	.254	3	32
Bobby Richardson	73	182	45	.247	0	14
Marv Throneberry	60	150	34	.227	7	19
Enos Slaughter	77	138	42	.304	4	19
Harry Simpson	24	51	11	.216	0	6
Darrell Johnson	5	16	4	.250	0	0
Bobby Del Greco	12	5	1	.200	0	0
Fritz Brickell	2	0	0	----	0	0

=== Pitching ===
==== Starting pitchers ====
Note: G = Games pitched; IP = Innings pitched; W = Wins; L = Losses; ERA = Earned run average; SO = Strikeouts

Player	G	IP	W	L	ERA	SO
Bob Turley	33	245.1	21	7	2.97	168
Whitey Ford	30	219.1	14	7	2.01	145
Don Larsen	19	114.1	9	6	3.07	55
Tom Sturdivant	15	70.2	3	6	4.20	41

==== Other pitchers ====
Note: G = Games pitched; IP = Innings pitched; W = Wins; L = Losses; ERA = Earned run average; SO = Strikeouts

Player	G	IP	W	L	ERA	SO
Art Ditmar	38	139.2	9	8	3.42	52
Johnny Kucks	34	126.0	8	8	3.93	46
Bobby Shantz	33	126.0	7	6	3.36	80
Duke Maas	22	101.1	7	3	3.82	50
Zach Monroe	21	58.0	4	2	3.26	18
Sal Maglie	7	23.1	1	1	4.63	7
Murry Dickson	6	20.1	1	2	5.75	9

==== Relief pitchers ====
Note: G = Games pitched; W = Wins; L = Losses; SV = Saves; ERA = Earned run average; SO = Strikeouts

Player	G	W	L	SV	ERA	SO
Ryne Duren	44	6	4	20	2.02	87
Virgil Trucks	25	2	1	1	4.54	26
Bob Grim	11	0	1	0	5.51	11
Johnny James	1	0	0	0	0.00	1

== 1958 World Series ==
AL New York Yankees (4) vs. NL Milwaukee Braves (3)

Game	Score	Date	Location	Attendance
1	Yankees – 3, Braves – 4 (10 innings)	October 1	Milwaukee County Stadium	46,367
2	Yankees – 5, Braves – 13	October 2	Milwaukee County Stadium	46,367
3	Braves – 0, Yankees – 4	October 4	Yankee Stadium	71,599
4	Braves – 3, Yankees – 0	October 5	Yankee Stadium	71,563
5	Braves – 0, Yankees – 7	October 6	Yankee Stadium	65,279
6	Yankees – 4, Braves – 3 (10 innings)	October 8	Milwaukee County Stadium	46,367
7	Yankees – 6, Braves – 2	October 9	Milwaukee County Stadium	46,367

== Awards and honors ==
- Elston Howard, Babe Ruth Award
- Bob Turley, Cy Young Award
  - Turley became the first American League pitcher to win the Cy Young Award.

All-Star Game

== Farm system ==
Level	Team	League	Manager
AAA	Denver Bears	American Association	Andy Cohen
AAA	Richmond Virginians	International League	Eddie Lopat
AA	New Orleans Pelicans	Southern Association	Charlie Silvera and Ray Yochim
A	Binghamton Triplets	Eastern League	Steve Souchock
B	Greensboro Yankees	Carolina League	Vern Hoscheit
C	Modesto Reds	California League	Dee Phillips
C	Fargo-Moorhead Twins	Northern League	Ken Silvestri
D	St. Petersburg Saints	Florida State League	Tom Hamilton
D	Kearney Yankees	Nebraska State League	Randy Gumpert
D	Auburn Yankees	New York–Penn League	Tom Gott

LEAGUE CHAMPIONS: Binghamton, Fargo-Moorhead, St. Petersburg
