= Bob Davis (pitcher) =

American baseball player (1933-2001)

- Pitcher
- Born: September 11, 1933; New York, New York, U.S.
- Died: December 22, 2001 (aged 68); New York, New York, U.S.
- Batted: Right Threw: Right

MLB debut
- July 26, 1958, for the Kansas City Athletics

Last MLB appearance
- October 1, 1960, for the Kansas City Athletics

MLB statistics
- Win–loss record: 0–4
- Earned run average: 5.71
- Strikeouts: 50
- Stats at Baseball Reference

Teams
- Kansas City Athletics (1958, 1960)

Robert Edward Davis (September 11, 1933 – December 22, 2001) was an American professional baseball pitcher who appeared in parts of two seasons in Major League Baseball, in 1958 and 1960, for the Kansas City Athletics. He threw and batted right-handed, stood 6 feet (1.8 m) tall and weighed 170 pounds (77 kg) during his baseball career. He was born in New York City.

== Early life ==
An alumnus of the Great Neck, New York, public schools, Davis, who was Jewish, attended the Loomis Chaffee School in Windsor, Connecticut, and pitched for Yale University. Davis earned a master's degree in history.

== Baseball career ==
Following the 1960 season, Davis was selected by the Los Angeles Angels in the 1960 Major League Baseball expansion draft for $75,000 ($808,000 today). However, rather than report to the Angels, Davis retired and returned to Yale to continue his education.

In his 29 MLB games pitched, 25 of them as a reliever, Davis was winless in four decisions, with one save and an earned run average of 5.71. In 63 innings pitched, he allowed 76 hits and 34 bases on balls, striking out 50.
