= Jack Feller =

American baseball player (born 1936)

- Catcher
- Born: December 10, 1936 (age 89); Adrian, Michigan, U.S.
- Batted: Right Threw: Right

MLB debut
- September 13, 1958, for the Detroit Tigers

Last MLB appearance
- September 13, 1958, for the Detroit Tigers

MLB statistics
- Games played: 1
- Total chances: 1
- Errors: 0
- Stats at Baseball Reference

Teams
- Detroit Tigers (1958)

Jack Leland Feller (born December 10, 1936) is an American former professional baseball player. A catcher, he played five years professionally (1955–1959) and appeared in one inning of one Major League Baseball game with the 1958 Detroit Tigers. He batted and threw right-handed, stood 5 feet 10 inches (1.78 m) tall and weighed 185 pounds (84 kg).

Feller was 21 years old and in his fourth pro season when he was summoned from the Tigers' Class A Augusta affiliate in the Sally League when the rosters expanded to 40 men in September 1958. He caught the top half of the ninth inning (in relief of Red Wilson) in a 13–2 rout of the Baltimore Orioles on September 13, with one putout and no errors. Feller never recorded a Major League plate appearance. However, he did have the distinction of catching a future Baseball Hall of Fame pitcher and United States Senator, Jim Bunning, who won his 12th game of the season that day.

Feller batted .272 in 474 minor league games before leaving baseball.

His scouting report in the March 1959 issue of Baseball Digest read: "Good arm and glove. Hitting problematical."
