= 1958 Major League Baseball season =

1958 MLB season
- League: American League (AL); National League (NL)
- Sport: Baseball
- Duration: Regular season: April 14 – September 28, 1958 (AL); April 15 – September 28, 1958 (NL); World Series: October 1–9, 1958
- Games: 154
- Teams: 16 (8 per league)
- TV partner(s): NBC, CBS

Regular season
- Season MVP: AL: Jackie Jensen (BOS); NL: Ernie Banks (CHC)
- AL champions: New York Yankees
- AL runners-up: Chicago White Sox
- NL champions: Milwaukee Braves
- NL runners-up: Pittsburgh Pirates

World Series
- Champions: New York Yankees
- Runners-up: Milwaukee Braves
- World Series MVP: Bob Turley (NYY)

MLB seasons
- ← 1957 1959 →

Locations of teams for the 1955–1960 American League seasons
American League
Locations of teams for the 1958 National League season
National League

The 1958 major league baseball season began on April 14, 1958. The regular season ended on September 28, with the Milwaukee Braves and New York Yankees as the regular season champions of the National League and American League, respectively. The postseason began with Game 1 of the 55th World Series on October 1 and ended with Game 7 on October 9. In the second iteration of this World Series matchup (and a rematch of the previous year), the Yankees defeated the Braves, four games to three, capturing their 18th championship in franchise history, since their previous in 1956. Going into the season, the defending World Series champions were the Milwaukee Braves from the 1957 season.

The 25th All-Star Game was held on July 8 at Baltimore Memorial Stadium in Baltimore, Maryland, home of the Baltimore Orioles. The American League won, 4–3.

Following the relocation trend that began in 1953, the National League's Brooklyn Dodgers and New York Giants moved from New York, New York (Brooklyn and Manhattan, respectively) to California (Los Angeles and San Francisco, respectively), becoming the fourth and fifth teams to relocate in the relocation era and leaving New York a one-team city. The moves to California marked the first time major-league teams played on the West Coast. The National League exodus from New York would go on to inspire the proposed Continental League the following year, which pressured the two existing leagues to begin expansion. New York went without a National League team for four seasons, until the expansion New York Mets began play in 1962.

On June 6, the Detroit Tigers became the 15th team in professional baseball to break the color line when they fielded Ozzie Virgil Sr.

== Schedule ==
The 1958 schedule consisted of 154 games for all teams in the American League and National League, each of which had eight teams. Each team was scheduled to play 22 games against the other seven teams of their respective league. This continued the format put in place since the 1904 season (except for 1919) and would be used until 1961 in the American League and 1962 in the National League.

American League Opening Day took place on April 14, featuring the Boston Red Sox and Washington Senators, while National League Opening Day took place the following day, featuring all eight NL teams. This continued the trend from the previous season which saw both leagues opened on different days. The final day of the regular season was on September 28, which saw fourteen teams play. The World Series took place between October 1 and October 9.

== Rule changes ==
The 1958 season saw the following rule changes:

- The Open Classification level ceased to exist, as the minor-league Pacific Coast League (PCL) was demoted to Triple-A following the relocation of the Giants and Dodgers to California.
- The bonus rule, which stipulated that players signed to major-league contract were required to spend the first two years on the parent team before he could farmed out or if signed to minor-league contract, players could not be moved up or down in the farms system for one year, was removed for the second time. In its place, Any player previously reserved by a minor league team of Double-A classification or higher, and who had been in the major or minor league system for at least four years, were now subjects to an unrestricted draft. For players in Single-A, players needed a minimum of three years to be subject to the draft, while players of lower classifications needed a minimum of two years.
  - Selection prices for players drafted by major-league team were set at $25,000 (equivalent to $279,000 in 2025).
- Scorers could now change a call if a player or umpire asked for said call to be checked.

== Teams ==
League	Team	City	Ballpark	Capacity	Manager
American League	Baltimore Orioles	Baltimore, Maryland	Baltimore Memorial Stadium	47,778	Paul Richards
American League	Boston Red Sox	Boston, Massachusetts	Fenway Park	34,819	Pinky Higgins
American League	Chicago White Sox	Chicago, Illinois	Comiskey Park	46,550	Al López
American League	Cleveland Indians	Cleveland, Ohio	Cleveland Stadium	73,811	Bobby Bragan
American League	Cleveland Indians	Cleveland, Ohio	Cleveland Stadium	73,811	Joe Gordon
American League	Detroit Tigers	Detroit, Michigan	Briggs Stadium	58,000	Jack Tighe
American League	Detroit Tigers	Detroit, Michigan	Briggs Stadium	58,000	Bill Norman
American League	Kansas City Athletics	Kansas City, Missouri	Municipal Stadium	30,296	Harry Craft
American League	New York Yankees	New York, New York	Yankee Stadium	67,205	Casey Stengel
American League	Washington Senators	Washington, D.C.	Griffith Stadium	28,669	Cookie Lavagetto
National League	Chicago Cubs	Chicago, Illinois	Wrigley Field	36,755	Bob Scheffing
National League	Cincinnati Redlegs	Cincinnati, Ohio	Crosley Field	29,584	Birdie Tebbetts
National League	Cincinnati Redlegs	Cincinnati, Ohio	Crosley Field	29,584	Jimmy Dykes
National League	Los Angeles Dodgers	Los Angeles, California	Los Angeles Memorial Coliseum	93,000	Walter Alston
National League	Milwaukee Braves	Milwaukee, Wisconsin	Milwaukee County Stadium	43,768	Fred Haney
National League	Philadelphia Phillies	Philadelphia, Pennsylvania	Connie Mack Stadium	33,359	Mayo Smith
National League	Philadelphia Phillies	Philadelphia, Pennsylvania	Connie Mack Stadium	33,359	Eddie Sawyer
National League	Pittsburgh Pirates	Pittsburgh, Pennsylvania	Forbes Field	34,249	Danny Murtaugh
National League	San Francisco Giants	San Francisco, California	Seals Stadium	22,900	Bill Rigney
National League	St. Louis Cardinals	St. Louis, Missouri	Busch Stadium	30,500	Fred Hutchinson
National League	St. Louis Cardinals	St. Louis, Missouri	Busch Stadium	30,500	Stan Hack

== Standings ==
=== American League ===
American League
Team	W	L	Pct.	GB	Home	Road
New York Yankees	92	62	.597	—	44‍–‍33	48‍–‍29
Chicago White Sox	82	72	.532	10	47‍–‍30	35‍–‍42
Boston Red Sox	79	75	.513	13	49‍–‍28	30‍–‍47
Cleveland Indians	77	76	.503	14½	42‍–‍34	35‍–‍42
Detroit Tigers	77	77	.500	15	43‍–‍34	34‍–‍43
Baltimore Orioles	74	79	.484	17½	46‍–‍31	28‍–‍48
Kansas City Athletics	73	81	.474	19	43‍–‍34	30‍–‍47
Washington Senators	61	93	.396	31	33‍–‍44	28‍–‍49

=== National League ===
National League
Team	W	L	Pct.	GB	Home	Road
Milwaukee Braves	92	62	.597	—	48‍–‍29	44‍–‍33
Pittsburgh Pirates	84	70	.545	8	49‍–‍28	35‍–‍42
San Francisco Giants	80	74	.519	12	44‍–‍33	36‍–‍41
Cincinnati Redlegs	76	78	.494	16	40‍–‍37	36‍–‍41
Chicago Cubs	72	82	.468	20	35‍–‍42	37‍–‍40
St. Louis Cardinals	72	82	.468	20	39‍–‍38	33‍–‍44
Los Angeles Dodgers	71	83	.461	21	39‍–‍38	32‍–‍45
Philadelphia Phillies	69	85	.448	23	35‍–‍42	34‍–‍43

=== Tie games ===
4 tie games (4 in AL, 0 in NL), which are not factored into winning percentage or games behind (and were often replayed again) occurred throughout the season.

==== American League ====
The Kansas City Athletics and Washington Senators had two tie games. The Baltimore Orioles, Boston Red Sox, Chicago White Sox, and New York Yankees had one each.

- May 4 (game 2), Washington Senators vs. Kansas City Athletics, tied at 2 after nine innings due to rain.
- June 13, Baltimore Orioles vs. Chicago White Sox, tied at 5 after 14 innings due to curfew.
- June 24, Kansas City Athletics vs. Washington Senators, tied at 2 after a shortened eight innings due to rain.
- July 5, New York Yankees vs. Boston Red Sox, tied at 3 after 10 innings. Top of 11th inning, which saw seven plate appearances from Boston with two outs, was negated due to 11:59 p.m. curfew to prevent game from spilling into Sunday.

== Postseason ==
The postseason began on October 1 and ended on October 9 with the New York Yankees defeating the Milwaukee Braves in the 1958 World Series in seven games.

=== Bracket ===
World Series
AL	New York Yankees	4
NL	Milwaukee Braves	3

== Managerial changes ==
=== Off-season ===
Team	Former Manager	New Manager
Chicago White Sox	Marty Marion	Al López
Cleveland Indians	Kerby Farrell	Bobby Bragan

=== In-season ===
Team	Former Manager	New Manager
Cincinnati Redlegs	Birdie Tebbetts	Jimmy Dykes
Cleveland Indians	Bobby Bragan	Joe Gordon
Detroit Tigers	Jack Tighe	Bill Norman
Philadelphia Phillies	Mayo Smith	Eddie Sawyer
St. Louis Cardinals	Fred Hutchinson	Stan Hack

== League leaders ==
=== American League ===
Hitting leaders
Stat	Player	Total
AVG	Ted Williams (BOS)	.328
OPS	Ted Williams (BOS)	1.042
HR	Mickey Mantle (NYY)	42
RBI	Jackie Jensen (BOS)	122
R	Mickey Mantle (NYY)	127
H	Nellie Fox (CWS)	187
SB	Luis Aparicio (CWS)	29

Pitching leaders
Stat	Player	Total
W	Bob Turley (NYY)	21
L	Pedro Ramos (WSH)	18
ERA	Whitey Ford (NYY)	2.01
K	Early Wynn (CWS)	179
IP	Frank Lary (DET)	260.1
SV	Ryne Duren (NYY); Dick Hyde (WSH)	19
WHIP	Whitey Ford (NYY)	1.076

=== National League ===
Hitting leaders
Stat	Player	Total
AVG	Richie Ashburn (PHI)	.350
OPS	Willie Mays (SF)	1.002
HR	Ernie Banks (CHC)	47
RBI	Ernie Banks (CHC)	129
R	Willie Mays (SF)	121
H	Richie Ashburn (PHI)	215
SB	Willie Mays (SF)	31

Pitching leaders
Stat	Player	Total
W	Bob Friend (PIT); Warren Spahn (MIL)	22
L	Ron Kline (PIT)	16
ERA	Stu Miller (SF)	2.47
K	Sam Jones (STL)	225
IP	Warren Spahn (MIL)	290.0
SV	Roy Face (PIT)	20
WHIP	Warren Spahn (MIL)	1.148

== Milestones ==
=== Batters ===
- Bob Lemon (CLE):
  - Tied a Major League record for most career home runs by a pitcher by hitting his 37th home run as a pitcher (he hit two additional home run as a pinch hitter) on April 30 against the Washington Senators.
- Stan Musial (STL):
  - Became the eighth member of the 3,000-hit club with a double in the sixth inning against the Chicago Cubs on May 13.

=== Pitchers ===
==== No-hitters ====
- Jim Bunning (DET):
  - Bunning threw his first career no-hitter and fourth no-hitter in franchise history, by defeating the Boston Red Sox 3–0 in game one of a doubleheader on July 20. Bunning walked two, hit one by pitch, and struck out 12.
- Hoyt Wilhelm (BAL/CLE):
  - Wilhelm threw his first career no-hitter and fifth no-hitter in franchise history as a part of the Baltimore Orioles, by defeating the New York Yankees 1–0 on September 20. Wilhelm walked two and struck out eight.

== Awards and honors ==
=== Regular season ===
Baseball Writers' Association of America Awards
BBWAA Award	National League	American League
Rookie of the Year	Orlando Cepeda (SF)	Albie Pearson (WSH)
Cy Young Award	—	Bob Turley (NYY)
Most Valuable Player	Ernie Banks (CHC)	Jackie Jensen (BOS)
Babe Ruth Award (World Series MVP)	—	Elston Howard (NYY)
Gold Glove Awards
Position	National League	American League
Pitcher	Harvey Haddix (CIN)	Bobby Shantz (NYY)
Catcher	Del Crandall (MIL)	Sherm Lollar (CWS)
1st Base	Gil Hodges (LAD)	Vic Power (CLE/KCA)
2nd Base	Bill Mazeroski (PIT)	Frank Bolling (DET)
3rd Base	Ken Boyer (STL)	Frank Malzone (BOS)
Shortstop	Roy McMillan (CIN)	Luis Aparicio (CWS)
Left field	Frank Robinson (CIN)	Norm Siebern (NYY)
Center field	Willie Mays (SF)	Jimmy Piersall (BOS)
Right field	Hank Aaron (MIL)	Al Kaline (DET)

=== Other awards ===
- Sport Magazine's World Series Most Valuable Player Award: Bob Turley (NYY)

The Sporting News Awards
Award	National League	American League
Player of the Year	—	Bob Turley (NYY)
Pitcher of the Year	Warren Spahn (MIL)	Bob Turley (NYY)
Rookie of the Year (Player)	Orlando Cepeda (SF)	Albie Pearson (WSH)
Rookie of the Year (Pitcher)	Carl Willey (MIL)	Ryne Duren (NYY)
Manager of the Year	—	Casey Stengel (NYY)
Executive of the Year	Joe L. Brown (PIT)	—

=== Monthly awards ===
==== Player of the Month ====
Month	National League
May	Willie Mays (SF); Stan Musial (STL)
June	Frank Thomas (PIT)
July	Joey Jay (MIL)
August	Lew Burdette (MIL)
September	Willie Mays (SF)

== Home field attendance ==
Team name	Wins	%±	Home attendance	%±	Per game
Milwaukee Braves	92	−3.2%	1,971,101	−11.0%	25,599
Los Angeles Dodgers	71	−15.5%	1,845,556	79.5%	23,968
New York Yankees	92	−6.1%	1,428,438	−4.6%	18,313
Pittsburgh Pirates	84	35.5%	1,311,988	54.2%	17,039
San Francisco Giants	80	15.9%	1,272,625	94.6%	16,528
Detroit Tigers	77	−1.3%	1,098,924	−13.6%	14,272
Boston Red Sox	79	−3.7%	1,077,047	−8.8%	13,988
St. Louis Cardinals	72	−17.2%	1,063,730	−10.1%	13,815
Chicago Cubs	72	16.1%	979,904	46.1%	12,726
Philadelphia Phillies	69	−10.4%	931,110	−18.8%	12,092
Kansas City Athletics	73	23.7%	925,090	2.7%	11,860
Baltimore Orioles	74	−2.6%	829,991	−19.4%	10,641
Chicago White Sox	82	−8.9%	797,451	−29.8%	10,357
Cincinnati Redlegs	76	−5.0%	788,582	−26.4%	10,241
Cleveland Indians	77	1.3%	663,805	−8.1%	8,734
Washington Senators	61	10.9%	475,288	4.0%	6,093

== Venues ==
The Los Angeles Dodgers, newly relocated from their long-time home in Brooklyn as the Brooklyn Dodgers, leave Ebbets Field after playing there for 45 seasons, moving into Los Angeles Memorial Coliseum where they would play for four seasons through 1961.

The San Francisco Giants, newly relocated from their long-time home in New York City as the New York Giants, leave the then-current iteration of the Polo Grounds after playing there for 67 seasons (75 seasons including previous iterations of the Polo Grounds,) moving into Seals Stadium where they would play for two seasons through the following season, 1959.

== Media ==
=== Television ===
CBS and NBC aired weekend Game of the Week broadcasts. NBC began airing a special regional feed of its games in the southeast. The All-Star Game and World Series also aired on NBC.

== See also ==
- 1958 in baseball (Events, Movies, Births, Deaths)
- 1958 Nippon Professional Baseball season
