= Jim Small (baseball) =

American baseball player (born 1937)

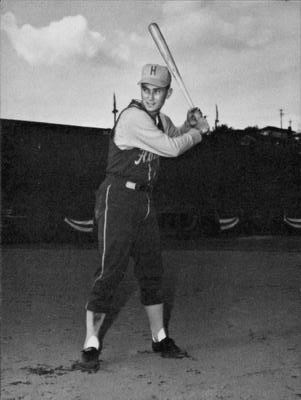
- Outfielder
- Born: March 8, 1937 (age 89); Portland, Oregon, U.S.
- Batted: Left Threw: Left

MLB debut
- June 22, 1955, for the Detroit Tigers

Last MLB appearance
- September 27, 1958, for the Kansas City Athletics

MLB statistics
- Batting average: .270
- Home runs: 0
- Runs batted in: 10
- Stats at Baseball Reference

Teams
- Detroit Tigers (1955–1957); Kansas City Athletics (1958)

James Arthur Patrick Small (born March 8, 1937) is an American former professional baseball player who appeared in 108 games as an outfielder, pinch hitter and pinch runner in Major League Baseball from 1955 to 1958 for the Detroit Tigers and Kansas City Athletics. Born in Portland, Oregon, he threw and batted left-handed, stood 6 feet 1 inch (1.85 m) tall and weighed 180 pounds (82 kg).

Small was signed as a free agent bonus baby by the Tigers in 1955 after he graduated from Bellarmine College Preparatory in San Jose, California. As a bonus baby, the Tigers were required to keep Small on their major league roster for both 1955 and 1956.

In the majors, Small appeared in 45 games as an outfielder, with the remainder of his MLB games played coming as a pinch hitter or runner. While he was playing in the minor leagues in 1960, the parent Athletics decided to convert Small into a pitcher. After getting shelled in 12 appearances, he was sent back to the outfield. Small did however make one pitching appearance in 1962, his last year in professional baseball.

Small batted .270 in 141 career at bats in the majors; his 38 hits included six doubles and two triples. He was credited with ten runs batted in.
