= Babe Ruth Award =

Major League Baseball award

- The 1958 Babe Ruth Award, won by Elston Howard
- Sport: Baseball
- League: Major League Baseball
- Awarded for: Annual most valuable player of the MLB postseason
- Presented by: New York City chapter of the Baseball Writers' Association of America

History
- First award: 1949
- Most recent: Yoshinobu Yamamoto (Los Angeles Dodgers)

The Babe Ruth Award is given annually to the Major League Baseball (MLB) player with the best performance in the postseason. The award, created in honor of Babe Ruth, was first awarded in 1949 to New York Yankee pitcher, Joe Page, the MVP of the World Series, one year after Ruth's death. The award was created by the New York City chapter of the Baseball Writers' Association of America (BBWAA). It continued to be awarded exclusively for performances in the World Series until 2007, when the New York chapter of the BBWAA changed the award to cover the entire postseason. Though it is older than the World Series Most Valuable Player Award, which was not created until 1955 (as the "SPORT Magazine Award"), the Babe Ruth Award is considered less prestigious, because it is not sanctioned by MLB and is awarded several weeks after the World Series.

MLB expanded its postseason to include the League Championship Series (LCS) in 1969, the League Division Series (LDS) in 1995, and the Wild Card round in 2012. The Wild Card Series is a best-of-three playoff format, the LDS follows a best-of-five playoff format, and the LCS and World Series follow a best-of-seven playoff format. In 2020, the Los Angeles Dodgers, won the 2020 World Series, but Randy Arozarena of the Tampa Bay Rays was named winner of the Babe Ruth Award.

Ruth was a noted slugger who batted .326 with 15 home runs and three wins in three games started as a pitcher during World Series play. However, the Babe Ruth Award does not only go to sluggers or pitchers. Dick Green won the award for the 1974 World Series, in which he batted 0-for-13, but helped the Oakland Athletics win the series with his defense.

Joe Page of the New York Yankees was the first winner of the Babe Ruth Award, and Jonathan Papelbon of the Boston Red Sox was the first winner since the award criteria changed to cover the entire postseason. In all, members of the Yankees have won the award sixteen times. Luis Tiant and Randy Arozarena are the only winners of the Babe Ruth Award to play for the World Series–losing team. Two players, Sandy Koufax and Jack Morris, have won the award twice.

== Winners ==
=== Key to table ===
Year	Links to the article about that corresponding World Series
Player (X)	Denotes winning player and number of times they had won the award at that point (if more than one)
^	Indicates multiple award winners in the same year
*	Indicates year when player did not win the World Series Most Valuable Player Award (1955–present)
†	Member of the Baseball Hall of Fame
‡	Denotes player who is still active
§	Indicates losing team in the series

=== Table of winners ===
Year	Player	Team	Position	Selected statistics (Note: For 1949–2006, statistics are for the World Series only. As the award was changed in 2007 to encompass the entire postseason, statistics from 2007 through the present represent the entire postseason.)	Ref
1949	Joe Page	New York Yankees	Pitcher	1–0 record and 1 save in 3 appearances; 2 earned runs allowed over 9 innings pitched; 8 strikeouts	
1950	Jerry Coleman	New York Yankees	Second baseman	.286 batting average; 4 hits; 3 runs batted in	
1951	Phil Rizzuto^{†}	New York Yankees	Shortstop	.320 batting average; 1 home run; 3 runs batted in	
1952	Johnny Mize^{†}	New York Yankees	First baseman	.400 batting average; 3 home runs; 6 runs batted in	
1953	Billy Martin	New York Yankees	Second baseman	.500 batting average; 12 hits; 8 runs batted in	
1954	Dusty Rhodes	New York Giants	Outfielder	4 hits in 6 at bats; 2 pinch hit home runs; 7 runs batted in	
1955	Johnny Podres	Brooklyn Dodgers	Pitcher	2–0 record in 2 games started; both were complete games; 1 shutout; 2 earned runs allowed over 18 innings pitched; 10 strikeouts	
1956	Don Larsen	New York Yankees	Pitcher	1–0 record in 2 games started; one perfect game; 7 strikeouts; Pitched first no-hitter in World Series history	
1957	Lew Burdette	Milwaukee Braves	Pitcher	3–0 record in 3 games started; all were complete games; 2 shutouts; 2 earned runs allowed over 27 innings pitched; 13 strikeouts	
1958*	Elston Howard	New York Yankees	Catcher	.222 batting average; Series-winning single in 8th inning of Game 7; 4 runs scored	
1959	Larry Sherry	Los Angeles Dodgers	Pitcher	2–0 record and 2 saves in 4 appearances; 1 earned run allowed over 12 2/3 innings pitched; 5 strikeouts	
1960*	Bill Mazeroski^{†}	Pittsburgh Pirates	Second baseman	.320 batting average; Series-winning walk-off home run in 9th inning of Game 7; 5 runs batted in	
1961	Whitey Ford^{†}	New York Yankees	Pitcher	2–0 record in 2 games started; one shutout; 14 scoreless innings pitched; 7 strikeouts	
1962	Ralph Terry	New York Yankees	Pitcher	2–1 record in 3 games started; two complete games; 1 shutout; 5 earned runs allowed over 25 innings pitched; 16 strikeouts	
1963	Sandy Koufax^{†}	Los Angeles Dodgers	Pitcher	2–0 record in 2 games started; both complete games; 3 earned runs allowed over 18 innings pitched; 23 strikeouts	
1964	Bob Gibson^{†}	St. Louis Cardinals	Pitcher	2–1 record in 3 games started; 2 complete games; 27 innings pitched; 31 strikeouts	
1965	Sandy Koufax^{†} (2)	Los Angeles Dodgers	Pitcher	2–1 record in 3 games started; two shutouts; 1 earned run allowed over 24 innings pitched; 29 strikeouts	
1966	Frank Robinson^{†}	Baltimore Orioles	Outfielder	.286 batting average; 2 home runs; 3 runs batted in	
1967*	Lou Brock^{†}	St. Louis Cardinals	Outfielder	.414 batting average; 8 runs scored; 7 stolen bases	
1968	Mickey Lolich	Detroit Tigers	Pitcher	3–0 record in 3 games started; all were complete games; 5 earned runs allowed over 27 innings pitched; 21 strikeouts	
1969*	Al Weis	New York Mets	Second baseman	.455 batting average; 1 home run; 3 runs batted in	
1970	Brooks Robinson^{†}	Baltimore Orioles	Third baseman	.429 batting average; 9 hits; 6 runs batted in	
1971	Roberto Clemente^{†}	Pittsburgh Pirates	Outfielder	.414 batting average; 12 hits; 4 runs batted in	
1972	Gene Tenace	Oakland Athletics	Catcher	.348 batting average; 4 home runs; 9 runs batted in	
1973*	Bert Campaneris	Oakland Athletics	Shortstop	.290 batting average; Series-winning home run in 3rd inning of Game 7; 3 stolen bases in 3 attempts	
1974*	Dick Green	Oakland Athletics	Second baseman	0 hits in 13 at bats; 1 run batted in and 1 run scored; Participated in 6 double plays defensively in 5 games; Single-game record (tie) 3 double plays in Game 3	
1975*	Luis Tiant	Boston Red Sox^{§}	Pitcher	2–0 record in 3 games started; 2 complete games; 1 shutout; 25 innings pitched; 12 strikeouts	
1976	Johnny Bench^{†}	Cincinnati Reds	Catcher	.533 batting average; 2 home runs; 6 runs batted in	
1977	Reggie Jackson^{†}	New York Yankees	Outfielder	.450 batting average; 5 home runs; 8 runs batted in	
1978	Bucky Dent	New York Yankees	Shortstop	.417 batting average; 10 hits; 7 runs batted in	
1979	Willie Stargell^{†}	Pittsburgh Pirates	First baseman	.400 batting average; 7 extra-base hits; 7 runs batted in	
1980*	Tug McGraw	Philadelphia Phillies	Pitcher	1–1 record and 2 saves in 4 appearances; 1 earned run allowed over 7 2/3 innings pitched; 10 strikeouts	
1981	Ron Cey	Los Angeles Dodgers	Third baseman	.350 batting average; 1 home run; 6 runs batted in	
1982*	Bruce Sutter^{†}	St. Louis Cardinals	Pitcher	1–0 record and 2 saves in 4 appearances; 7 2/3 innings pitched; 6 strikeouts	
1983	Rick Dempsey	Baltimore Orioles	Catcher	.385 batting average; 4 doubles; 2 runs batted in	
1984*	Jack Morris^{†}	Detroit Tigers	Pitcher	2–0 record in 2 games started; both complete games; 4 earned runs allowed over 18 innings pitched; 13 strikeouts	
1985	Bret Saberhagen	Kansas City Royals	Pitcher	2–0 record in 2 games started; both were complete games; 1 shutout; 1 earned run allowed over 18 innings pitched; 10 strikeouts	
1986	Ray Knight	New York Mets	Third baseman	.391 batting average; Series-winning home run in 7th inning of Game 7; 5 runs batted in	
1987	Frank Viola	Minnesota Twins	Pitcher	2–1 record in 3 games started; 8 earned runs allowed over 19 1/3 innings pitched; 16 strikeouts	
1988	Orel Hershiser	Los Angeles Dodgers	Pitcher	2–0 record in 2 games started; both were complete games; 1 shutout; 2 earned runs allowed over 18 innings pitched; 17 strikeouts	
1989	Dave Stewart	Oakland Athletics	Pitcher	2–0 record in 2 games started; one shutout; 3 earned runs allowed over 16 innings pitched; 14 strikeouts	
1990*	Billy Hatcher	Cincinnati Reds	Outfielder	.750 batting average; 9 hits; 4 doubles; 6 runs scored	
1991	Jack Morris^{†} (2)	Minnesota Twins	Pitcher	2–0 record over 3 games started; 10-inning shutout in Game 7; 3 earned runs allowed over 23 innings pitched; 15 strikeouts	
1992*	Dave Winfield^{†}	Toronto Blue Jays	Outfielder	.227 batting average; 5 hits; Series-winning 2 run batted in double in 11th inning of Game 6	
1993	Paul Molitor^{†}	Toronto Blue Jays	Designated hitter	.500 batting average; 12 hits; 6 extra-base hits; 8 runs batted in	
1994	Series canceled by the players' strike				
1995	Tom Glavine^{†}	Atlanta Braves	Pitcher	2–0 record over 2 games started; 2 earned runs allowed over 14 innings pitched; 11 strikeouts	
1996*	Cecil Fielder	New York Yankees	Designated hitter	.391 batting average; 9 hits; 2 runs batted in	
1997*	Moisés Alou	Florida Marlins	Outfielder	.321 batting average; 3 home runs; 9 runs batted in	
1998	Scott Brosius	New York Yankees	Third baseman	.471 batting average; 2 home runs; 6 runs batted in	
1999	Mariano Rivera^{†}	New York Yankees	Pitcher	1–0 record and 2 saves in 3 appearances; 4 2/3 scoreless innings pitched; 3 strikeouts	
2000	Derek Jeter^{†}	New York Yankees	Shortstop	.409 batting average; 2 home runs; 6 runs scored	
2001^	Randy Johnson^{†}	Arizona Diamondbacks	Pitcher	3–0 record in 3 appearances (2 starts); one shutout; 2 earned runs allowed over 17 1/3 innings pitched; 19 strikeouts	
2001^	Curt Schilling	Arizona Diamondbacks	Pitcher	1–0 record in 3 games started; 4 earned runs allowed over 21 1/3 innings pitched; 26 strikeouts	
2002	Troy Glaus	Anaheim Angels	Third baseman	.385 batting average; 3 home runs; 8 runs batted in	
2003	Josh Beckett	Florida Marlins	Pitcher	1–1 record in 2 games started; one shutout; 2 earned runs allowed over 16 1/3 innings pitched; 19 strikeouts	
2004*	Keith Foulke	Boston Red Sox	Pitcher	1–0 record and 1 save in 4 appearances; 1 earned run allowed over 5 innings pitched; 8 strikeouts	
2005	Jermaine Dye	Chicago White Sox	Outfielder	.438 batting average; Series-winning single in 8th inning of Game 4; 3 runs batted in	
2006	David Eckstein	St. Louis Cardinals	Shortstop	.364 batting average; 8 hits; 4 runs batted in	
Award changed to cover performance in full post-season
2007*	Jonathan Papelbon	Boston Red Sox	Pitcher	1–0 record and 4 saves in 7 appearances; 10 2/3 scoreless innings pitched; 7 strikeouts	
2008	Cole Hamels	Philadelphia Phillies	Pitcher	4–0 record over 5 games started; 7 earned runs allowed over 35 innings pitched (1.80 ERA); 30 strikeouts	
2009*	Alex Rodriguez	New York Yankees	Third baseman	.365 batting average; 6 home runs; 18 runs batted in	
2010*	Tim Lincecum	San Francisco Giants	Pitcher	4–1 record in 6 appearances (5 games started); 1 shutout; 10 earned runs allowed over 37 innings pitched; 43 strikeouts	
2011	David Freese	St. Louis Cardinals	Third baseman	.397 batting average; 5 home runs; Set postseason records with 50 total bases and 21 runs batted in	
2012	Pablo Sandoval	San Francisco Giants	Third baseman	.364 batting average; 6 home runs; 13 runs batted in	
2013	David Ortiz^{†}	Boston Red Sox	First baseman / Designated hitter	.353 batting average; 5 home runs; 13 runs batted in	
2014	Madison Bumgarner	San Francisco Giants	Pitcher	4–1 record and 1 save in 7 appearances (6 games started); 2 shutouts; 1.03 ERA on 6 earned runs allowed over 52 2/3 innings pitched; 45 strikeouts	
2015*	Wade Davis	Kansas City Royals	Pitcher	1–0 record and 4 saves in 8 appearances; 10 2/3 scoreless innings pitched; 18 strikeouts	
2016*	Jon Lester	Chicago Cubs	Pitcher	3–1 record in 6 appearances; 2.02 ERA on 8 earned runs allowed over 35 2/3 innings pitched; 30 strikeouts	
2017^	Jose Altuve^{‡}	Houston Astros	Second baseman	7 home runs; 14 RBIs; .310 Batting average	
2017^	Justin Verlander^{‡}	Houston Astros	Pitcher	4–1 record, 1 complete game in 6 games started; 38 strikeouts, 8 earned runs allowed over 36 2/3 innings pitched; 2017 American League Championship Series MVP	
2018*	David Price	Boston Red Sox	Pitcher	3–1 record in 6 appearances; 23 strikeouts, 10 earned runs allowed over 26 innings pitched; Winning pitcher of Games 2 & 5 in the World Series	
2019^	Juan Soto^{‡}	Washington Nationals	Outfielder	.277 batting average; 5 home runs; 14 runs batted in	
2019^	Stephen Strasburg	Washington Nationals	Pitcher	5–0 record; 1.98 ERA; 47 strikeouts	
2020*	Randy Arozarena^{‡}	Tampa Bay Rays^{§}	Outfielder	.377 batting average; 10 home runs (an MLB record); 64 total bases	
2021*	Freddie Freeman^{‡}	Atlanta Braves	First baseman	.304 batting average; 5 home runs; 11 runs batted in	
2022	Jeremy Peña^{‡}	Houston Astros	Shortstop	.345 batting average; 4 home runs; 8 runs batted in	
2023*	Adolis García^{‡}	Texas Rangers	Outfielder	.323 batting average; 8 home runs; 22 runs batted in	
2024*	Mookie Betts^{‡}	Los Angeles Dodgers	Outfielder	.290 batting average; 4 home runs; 16 runs batted in	
2025	Yoshinobu Yamamoto^{‡}	Los Angeles Dodgers	Pitcher	5–1 record in 6 appearances (5 starts); two complete games; 1.45 ERA	

== Image gallery ==
Hall of Famer Sandy Koufax, a two-time winner

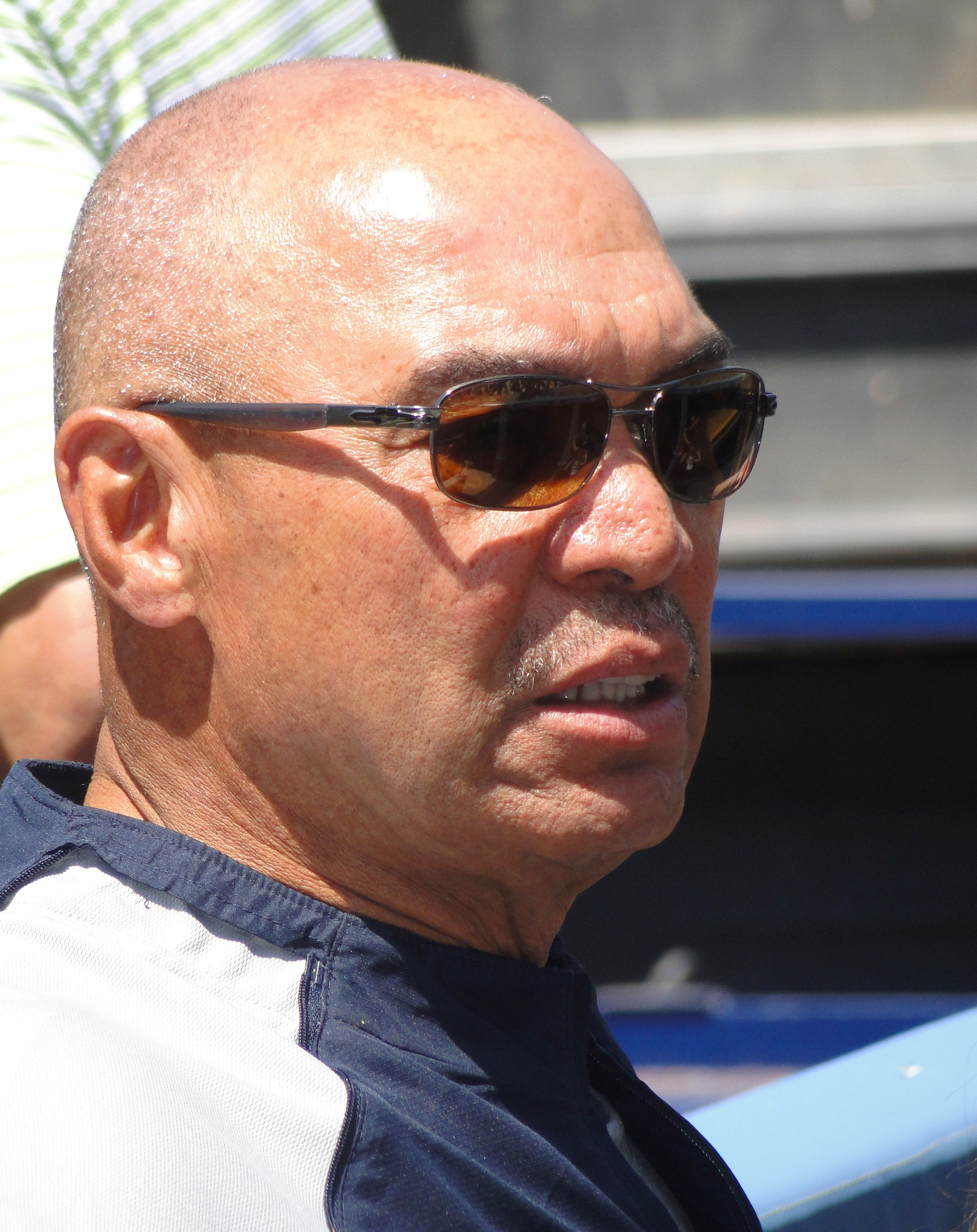
Reggie Jackson won the award in 1977.

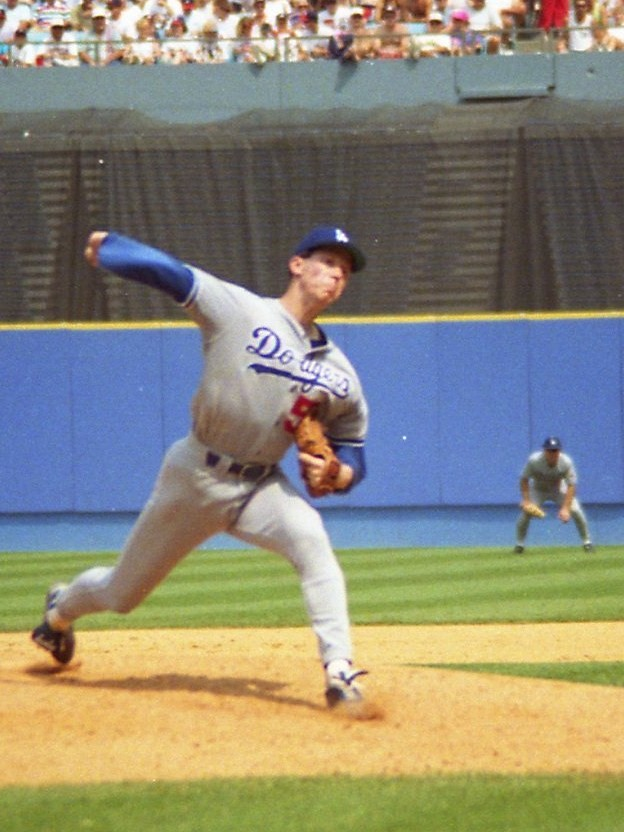
Orel Hershiser won the award in 1988.

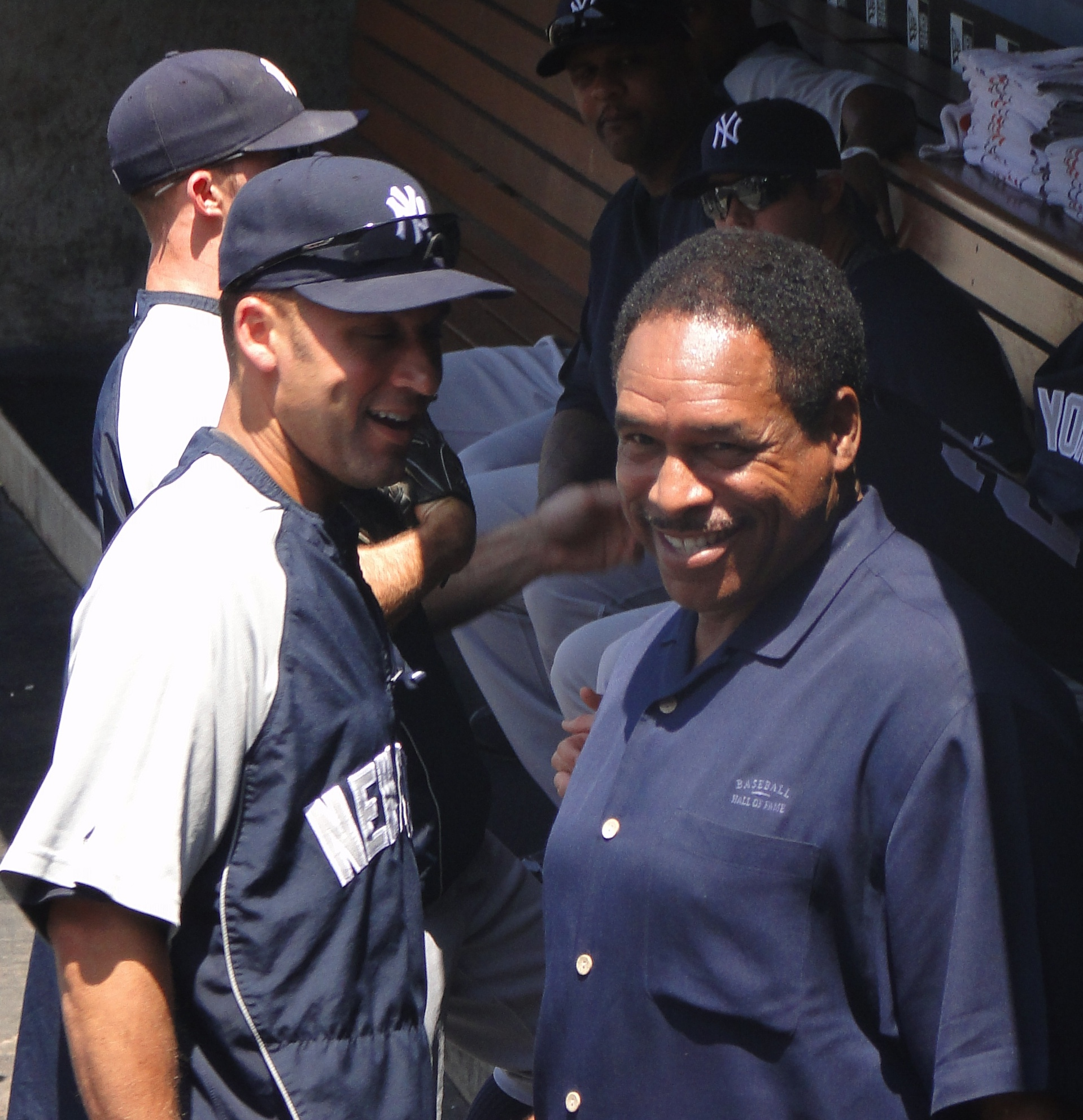
Derek Jeter (left) won the award in 2000, while Dave Winfield (right) won the award in 1992.

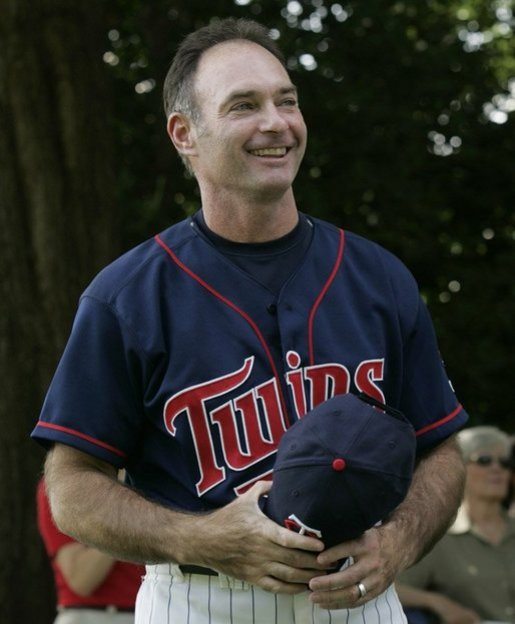
Paul Molitor won the award in 1993.

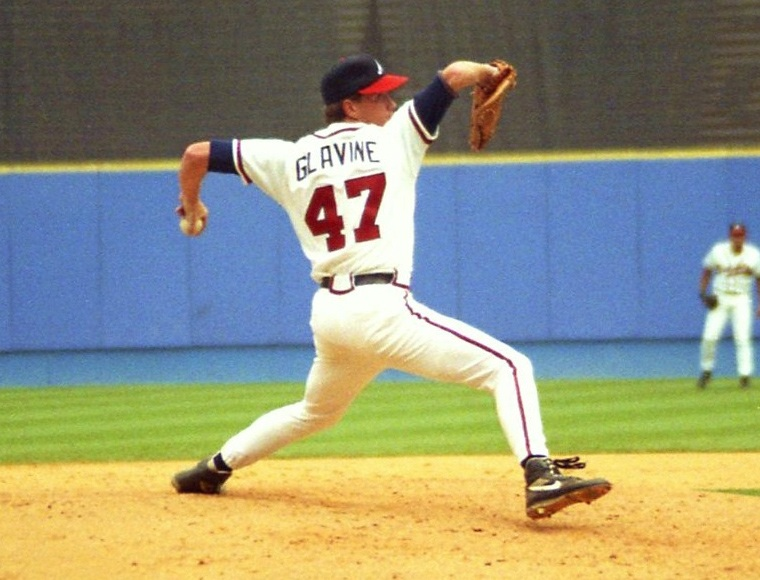
Tom Glavine won the award in 1995

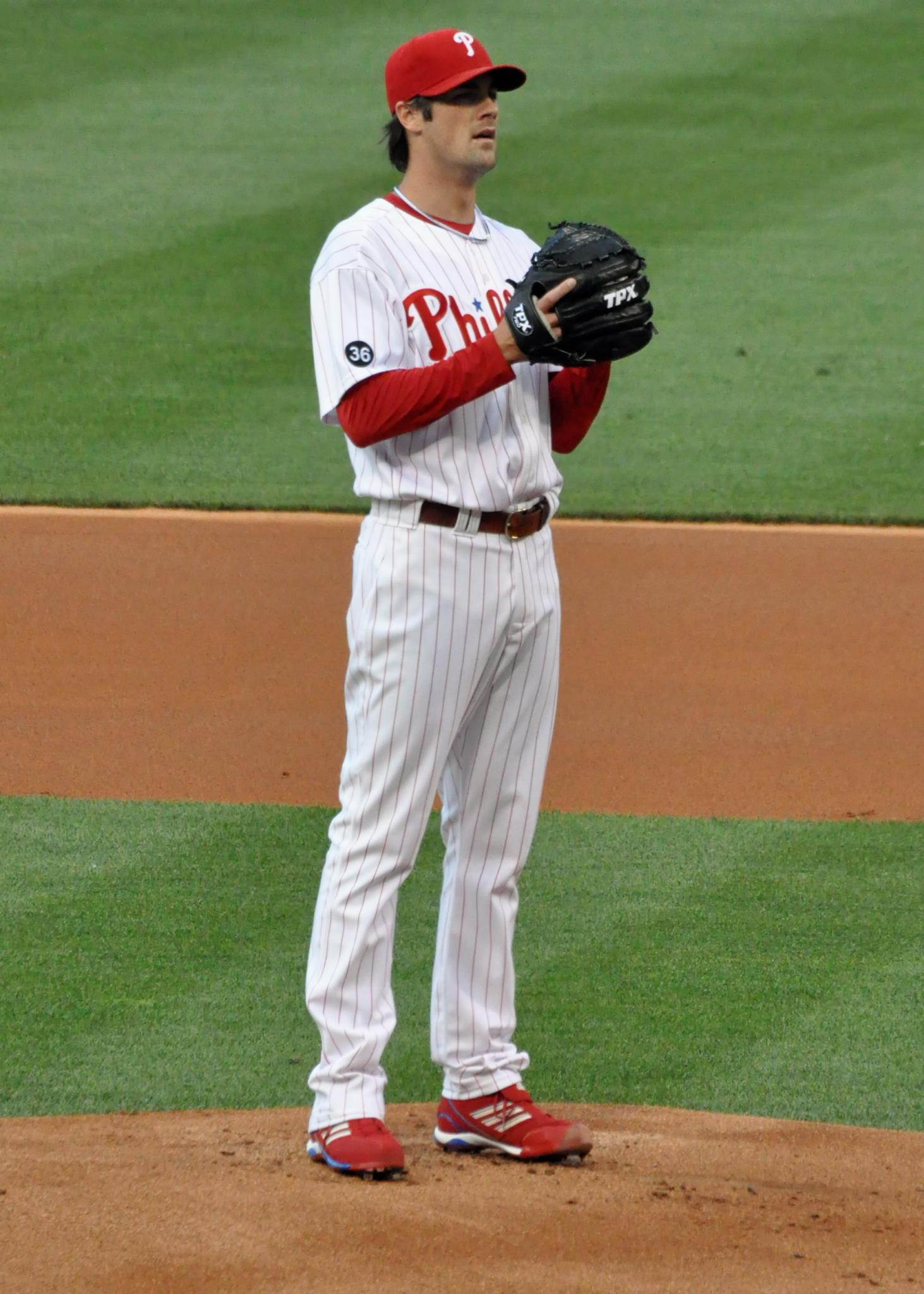
Cole Hamels won the award in 2008.

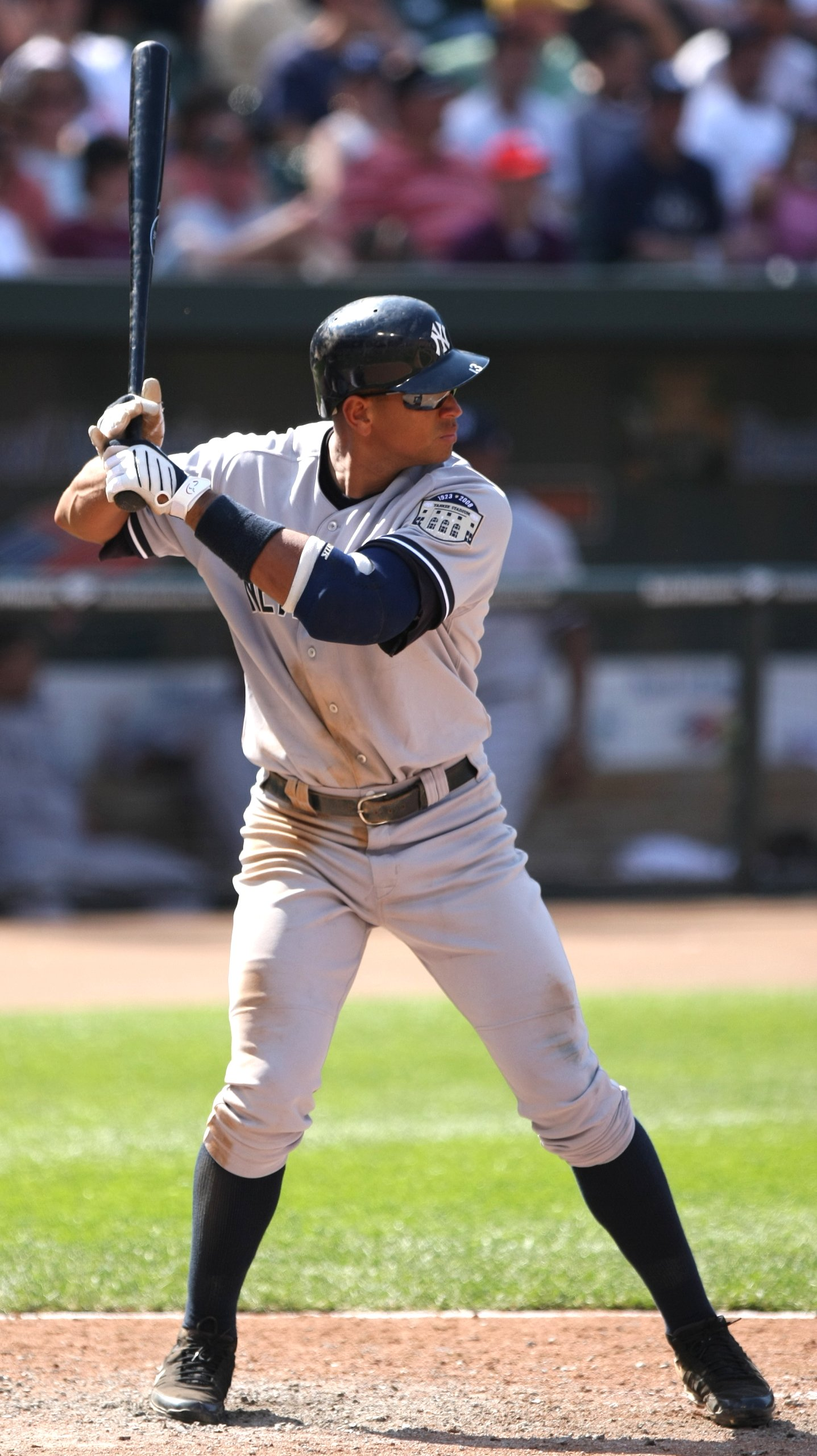
Alex Rodriguez won the award in 2009.

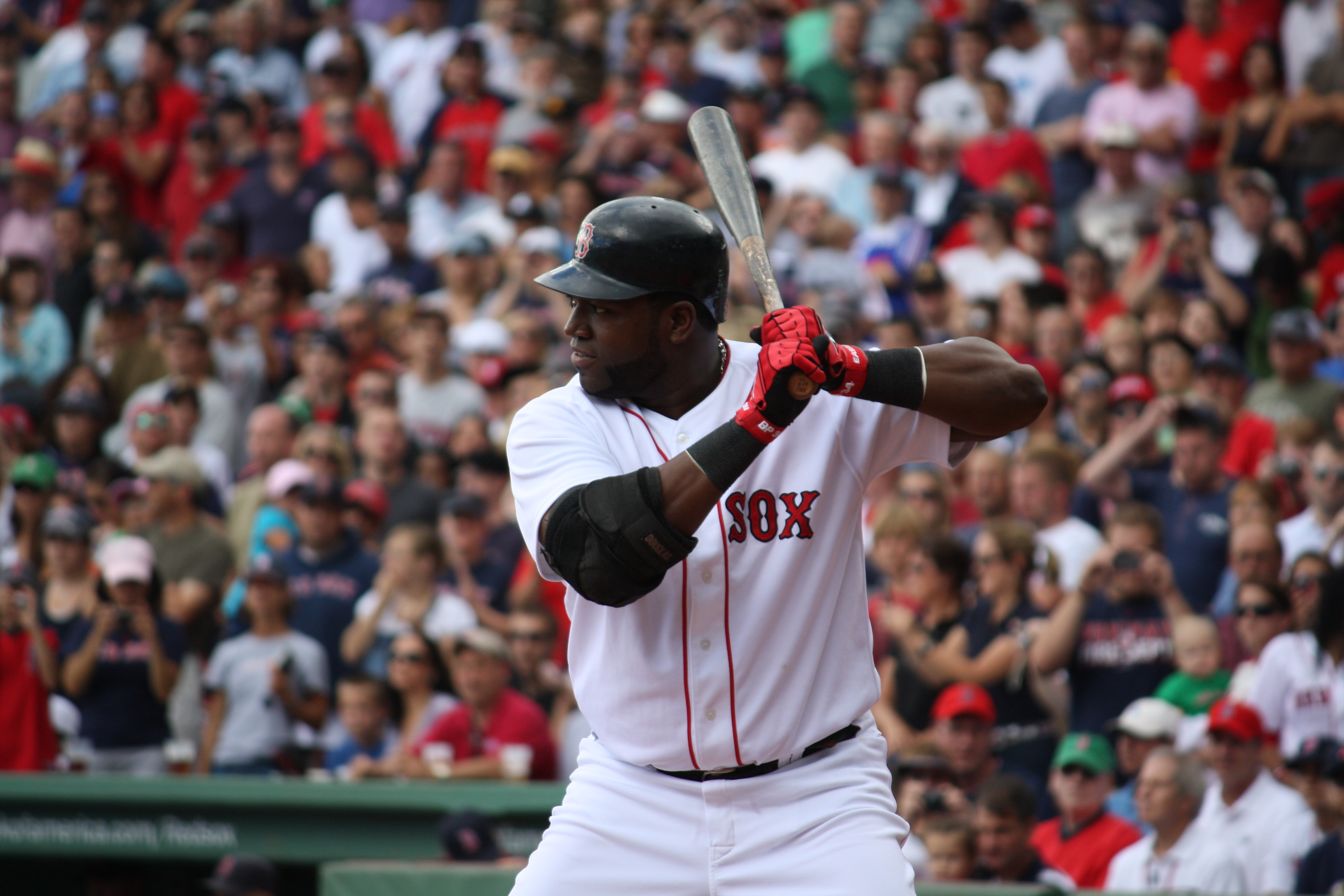
David Ortiz won the award in 2013.

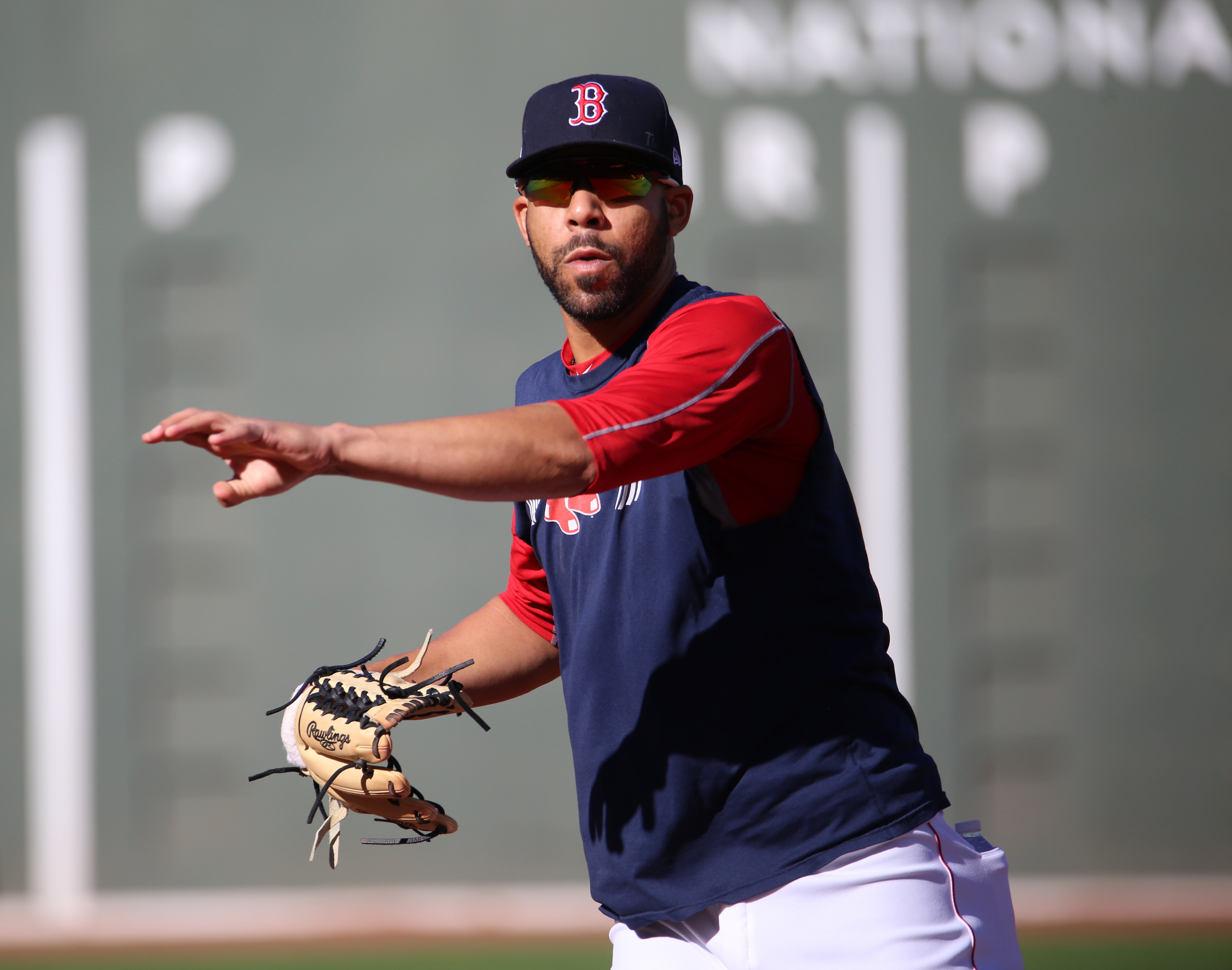
David Price won the award in 2018.

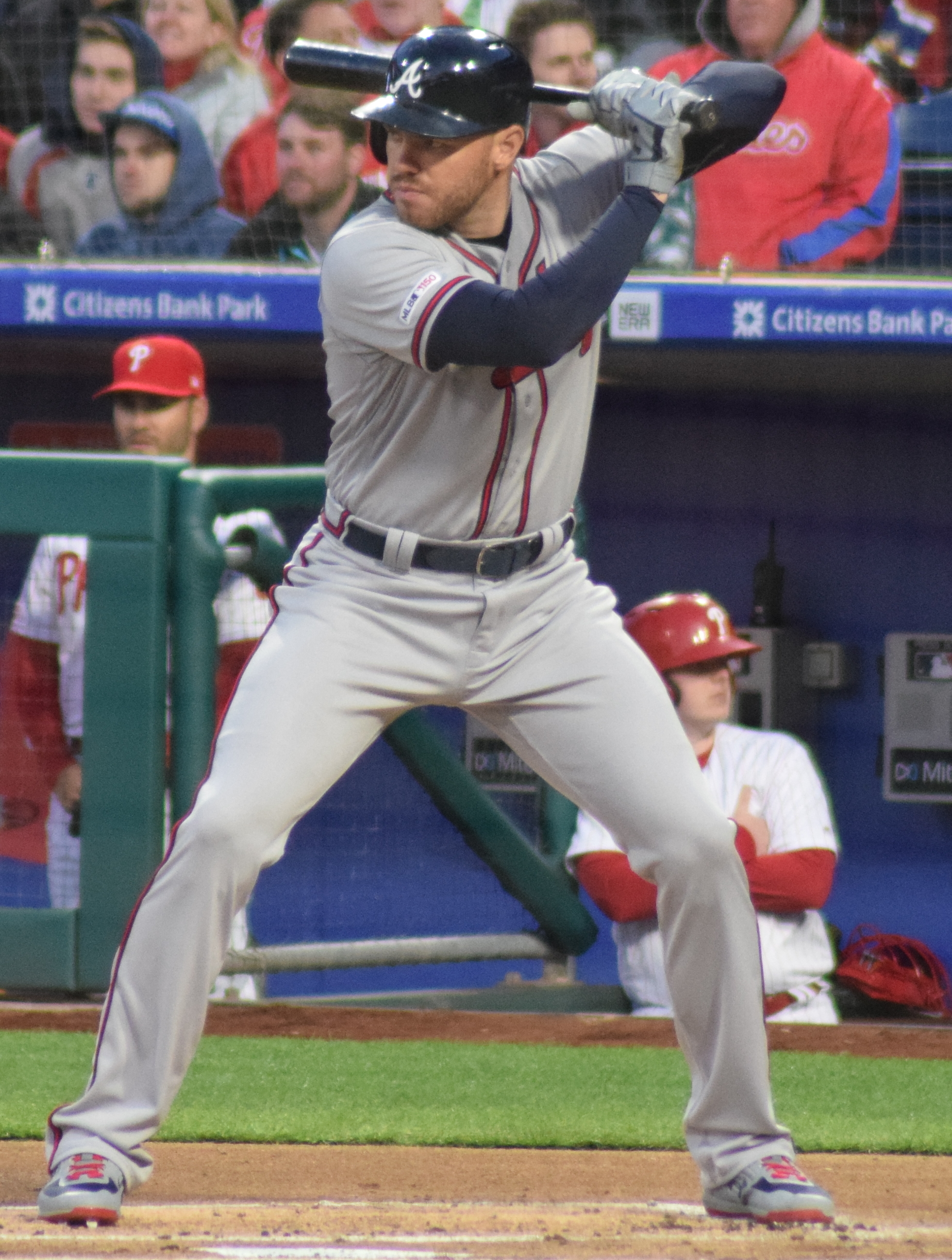
Freddie Freeman won the award in 2021.

== See also ==
- List of BBWAA awards
- "This Year in Baseball Awards" Best Major Leaguer, Postseason
- Baseball awards
- Conn Smythe Trophy, the National Hockey League's award for its postseason MVP
