= Elston Howard =

American baseball player and coach (1929–1980)

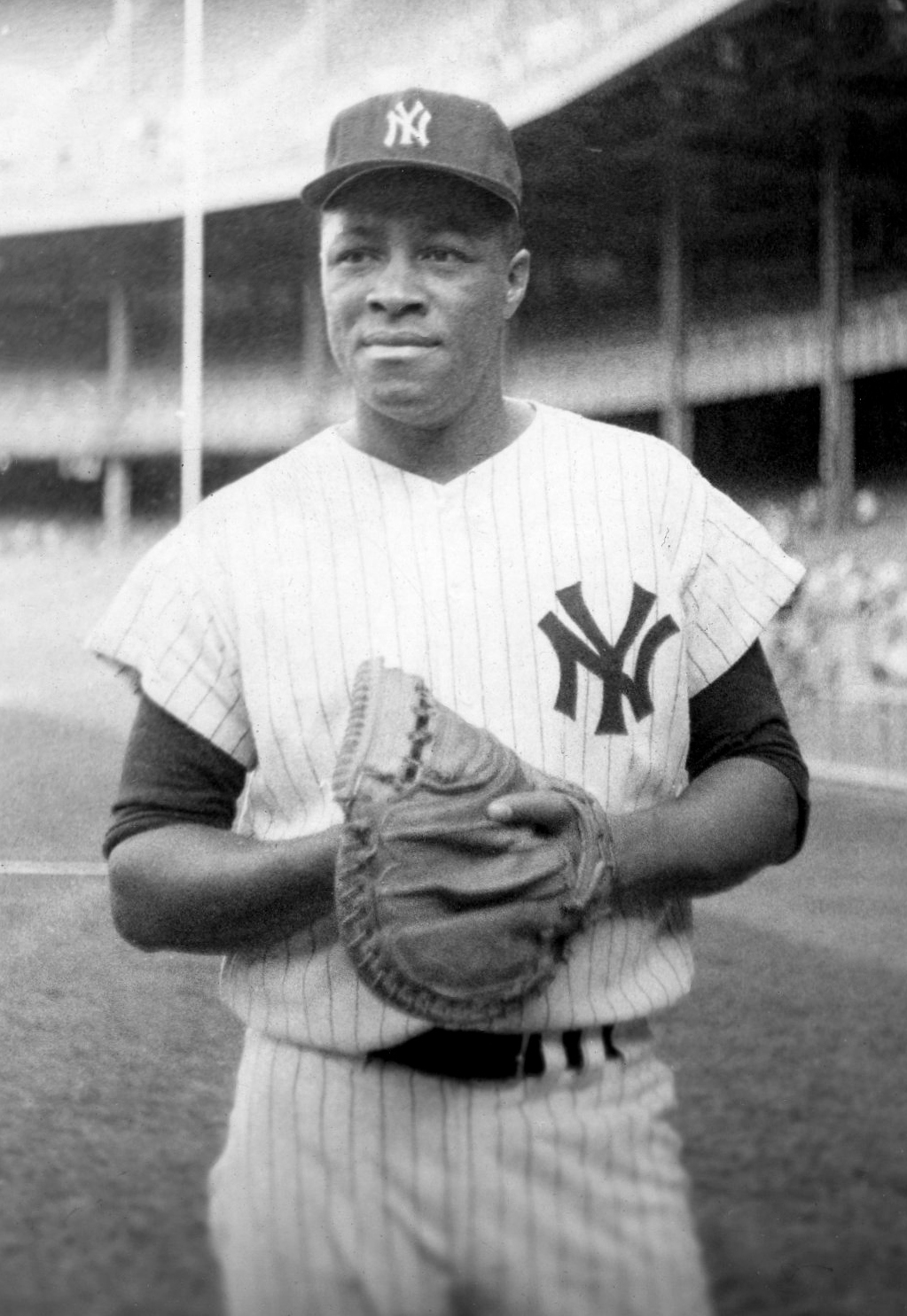
- Catcher / Left fielder
- Born: February 23, 1929; St. Louis, Missouri, U.S.
- Died: December 14, 1980 (aged 51); Manhattan, New York, U.S.
- Batted: Right Threw: Right

MLB debut
- April 14, 1955, for the New York Yankees

Last MLB appearance
- September 29, 1968, for the Boston Red Sox

MLB statistics
- Batting average: .274
- Home runs: 168
- Runs batted in: 775
- Stats at Baseball Reference

Teams
- As player: Kansas City Monarchs (1948); New York Yankees (1955–1967); Boston Red Sox (1967–1968); As coach: New York Yankees (1969–1979)

Career highlights and awards
- 12× All-Star (1957, 1958, 1959²–1965); 6× World Series champion (1956, 1958, 1961, 1962, 1977, 1978); AL MVP (1963); 2× Gold Glove Award (1963, 1964); New York Yankees No. 32 retired; Monument Park honoree
Military career
Allegiance	United States
Branch	United States Army
Service years	1951–1952
Units	Special Services
Conflicts	Korean War

Elston Gene Howard (February 23, 1929 – December 14, 1980) was an American professional baseball player who was a catcher and a left fielder. During a 14-year baseball career, he played in the Negro leagues and Major League Baseball (MLB) from 1948 through 1968, primarily for the New York Yankees. A 12-time All-Star, he also played for the Kansas City Monarchs and the Boston Red Sox. Howard served on the Yankees' coaching staff from 1969 to 1979.

In 1955, he was the first African American player on the Yankees roster, eight years after Jackie Robinson had broken MLB's color barrier in 1947. Howard was named the American League's Most Valuable Player for the 1963 pennant winners after finishing third in the league in slugging average and fifth in home runs, becoming the first black player in AL history to win the honor. He won Gold Glove Awards in 1963 and 1964, in the latter season setting AL records for putouts and total chances in a season. His lifetime fielding percentage of .993 as a catcher was a major league record from 1967 to 1973, and he retired among the AL career leaders in putouts (7th, 6,447) and total chances (9th, 6,977).

== Early life ==
Elston Gene Howard was born on February 23, 1929, in St. Louis, Missouri, to Travis Howard and Emaline Hill, a nurse at a local hospital. When he was six years old, his parents divorced and his mother remarried. Howard was a standout athlete at Vashon High School.

== Professional career ==
=== Negro leagues ===
In 1948, nineteen-year-old Howard turned down college football scholarship offers from Illinois, Michigan, and Michigan State and instead signed to play professional baseball for $500 a month ($6,634.83 in 2025) with the Kansas City Monarchs of the Negro American League under manager Buck O'Neil. He was an outfielder for three seasons and in 1950 roomed with Ernie Banks.

=== Minor leagues ===
The Yankees signed Howard on July 19, 1950, after purchasing his contract along with the contract of Frank Barnes. They were assigned to the Muskegon Clippers, the Yankees' farm team in the Central League. Howard missed the 1951 and 1952 seasons due to his military service in the U.S. Army.

In 1953, Howard played for the Kansas City Blues of the Class AAA American Association. The next year, the Yankees invited Howard to spring training and converted him into a catcher, despite the presence of Yogi Berra as the Yankees' starting catcher.

He played with the Toronto Maple Leafs of the Class AAA International League in 1954, where he led the league in triples, with 16, to go along with 22 home runs, 109 runs batted in and a .330 average, winning the league's MVP award.

The Yankees assigned Bill Dickey to work with Howard in order to develop his catching skills.

=== New York Yankees (1955–1967) ===
==== 1950s ====
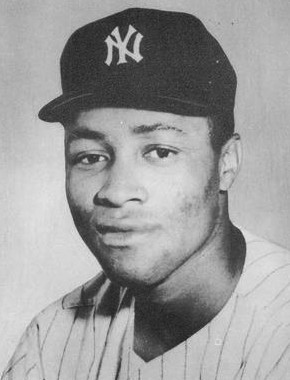
Howard in 1957

Howard made the Yankees' Major League roster at the start of the 1955 season. On April 14, 1955 (the second game of the season), Howard made his major league debut when he entered the game in the sixth inning as a left fielder. Howard hit a single in his only plate appearance of the day. He became the first black player to play for the Yankees. Howard was known to be very slow afoot. When Howard first came to the Yankees, manager Casey Stengel referred to him as "Eightball". Howard made his first start on April 28, because it was difficult to find room for Howard in the lineup. Berra won his third MVP award in 1955, and Mickey Mantle and Hank Bauer were solid outfield regulars. Stengel used Howard as a backup catcher and occasional outfielder; he competed for playing time with Norm Siebern and Enos Slaughter. He hit .290 with 10 home runs and 43 runs batted in (RBIs) in 97 games played for the season.

In the 1955 World Series against the Brooklyn Dodgers, Howard hit a home run off Don Newcombe in his first at bat in the second inning of Game 1. The round tripper tied the game at 2–2 and the Yankees went on to win the game, 6–5. Howard's ground ball out to Pee Wee Reese in Game 7 ended the Series; it was the first time in six meetings the Yankees had lost to Brooklyn. In the 1956 World Series against Brooklyn he played only in Game 7, but his solo home run off Newcombe in the fourth inning was one of four Yankee HRs in Johnny Kucks' 9–0 victory. Against the Milwaukee Braves in the 1957 World Series, his three-run homer off Warren Spahn with two outs in the ninth inning of Game 4 tied the score 4-4, though Milwaukee won 7–5 in the 10th inning on an Eddie Mathews’ walk-off home run. As the Yankees again met the Braves in the 1958 World Series, his impact did not become notable until Game 5, when he caught Red Schoendienst's sinking fly ball in the sixth inning and made a throw to catch Bill Bruton off first base for a double play, preserving a 1–0 lead. In Game 6, he threw Andy Pafko out at the plate in the second inning, and singled and scored with two out in the tenth inning for a 4-2 Yankee lead; the run proved decisive, as the Braves came back to score once in the bottom of the frame. In Game 7, his two-out RBI single scored Berra for a 3–2 lead in the eighth inning, with New York going on to a 6–2 win, completing only the second comeback by a team from a 3–1 deficit in a Series. Howard was later given the Babe Ruth Award, presented by the New York chapter of the Baseball Writers' Association of America, as the top player in the Series, although the World Series MVP Award was won by teammate Bob Turley.

By 1959, Howard was often playing at first base in order to remain in the lineup. Despite not finding a regular position yet, he was first selected to the All-Star team in 1957, the first of nine consecutive years through 1965 in which he made the squad; he would appear in six of the games (1960–1964), including both 1961 contests.

==== 1960s ====
In 1960, Howard took over the majority of Berra's catching duties, although his .245 batting average was his lowest to date. The Yankees met the Pittsburgh Pirates in the 1960 World Series, and Howard's two-run pinch-hit homer off Roy Face in the ninth inning of Game 1 brought the Yankees within two runs, though they lost 6–4. Howard hit .462 in the Series, but did not play in Game 7 after being hit on the hand by a pitch in the second inning of Game 6, and could only watch as the Pirates won the Series, 10–9, on Bill Mazeroski's home run leading off the bottom of the ninth.

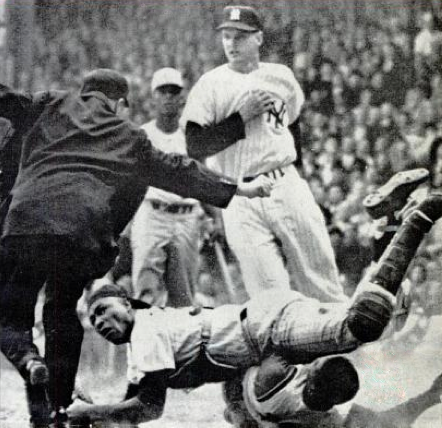
Howard during a collision at home plate, 1961 World Series. The umpire is Jocko Conlan.

In 1961, he raised his average 103 points to a career-best .348 mark on a team that featured Roger Maris's record 61-home run season; Howard also enjoyed his first 20-homer campaign, along with 77 RBI, as the Yankees set a major league record with 240 HRs. He finished tenth in the MVP voting that year, won by Maris. Meeting the Cincinnati Reds in the 1961 Series, he and Bill Skowron had solo home runs in the 2-0 Game 1 victory, and he scored three runs in the final 13–5 win in Game 5. He followed up with a 1962 season in which he batted .279 with a career-best 91 RBI, again hitting over 20 homers, and collecting eight RBI in an August 19 game in Kansas City which the Yankees won, 21–7. Although Howard batted only .143 in the 1962 World Series against the San Francisco Giants, the Yankees won in seven games.

In his 1963 MVP season, he batted .287 with 28 home runs, 85 RBI and a .528 slugging average, also winning his first Gold Glove. The Yankees were swept by the Los Angeles Dodgers in the 1963 Series, though Howard hit .333 and drove in the only Yankees run of Game 2. He batted .313 (just ten points behind batting champion Tony Oliva) with 84 RBI in 1964, again winning the Gold Glove and placing third in the MVP vote as Berra took over Ralph Houk's post as manager. His totals of 939 putouts and 1,008 total chances broke the AL records of 872 and 963 set by Earl Battey with the 1962 Minnesota Twins; Bill Freehan would top Howard's marks with the 1967 Detroit Tigers. Howard also led the AL in fielding average in 1964 with a .998 mark. Playing in his ninth World Series in ten years against the St. Louis Cardinals, he batted .292, though the Yankees were overcome in seven games; he tied a Series record with three passed balls, including two in the 9-5 Game 1 loss. In 1965, Howard injured his elbow during spring training. He played in four games through April, then had surgery, missing five more weeks.

Howard struggled in 1967. He backed up Jake Gibbs and batted only .198 through the start of August.

=== Boston Red Sox (1967–1968) ===
On August 3, 1967, Howard was traded to the Boston Red Sox for Pete Magrini and a player to be named later, Ron Klimkowski. Though he batted only .147 for Boston, he was effective in handling the pitchers; teammate Tony Conigliaro noted, "I don't think I ever saw a pitcher shake off one of his signs. They had too much respect for him." In 1967, Howard also took over Sherm Lollar's major-league record for career fielding average; Freehan moved ahead of him in 1973.

One of Howard's highlights during his time with the Red Sox occurred on August 27, 1967, when the Chicago White Sox were battling the Red Sox for the pennant. With Ken Berry on third base with one out in the bottom of the ninth inning and the Red Sox leading 4–3, Duane Josephson lined out to Jose Tartabull in right field. Not known for having a strong arm, Tartabull's throw sailed high and was caught by a leaping Howard, who blocked the plate with his left foot as he came down, and swipe tagged Berry — ending the game. For Red Sox fans, the play was considered a key event during their "Impossible Dream" season.

Howard had his last postseason highlight in the 1967 World Series against the Cardinals when his bases-loaded single in the ninth inning of Game 5 drove in two runs for a 3–0 lead. The hit was crucial, as former teammate Maris homered in the bottom of the inning for the Cardinals before the Red Sox closed out the 3–1 win. St. Louis, however, won the Series in seven games. It was the sixth losing World Series team Howard played on; he and Pee Wee Reese have the dubious distinction for playing on the most losing World Series teams.

On October 29, 1968, Howard was released by the Red Sox. Over his 14-year career, he batted .274 with 167 home runs, 1,471 hits, 762 RBI, 619 runs, 218 doubles, 50 triples and nine stolen bases in 1,605 games. His .427 slugging average trailed those of only Dickey (.486), Berra (.482) and Mickey Cochrane (.478) among AL catchers. Defensively, he recorded a .993 fielding percentage as a catcher and an overall .992 fielding percentage. Howard also played at left and right field and first base. His 54 total World Series games placed him behind only teammates Berra and Mantle. Howard is also credited with being the first to use the extended index and pinky finger (corna) to indicate that there were two out in the inning, this being more visible to teammates in the outfield than the usual "two" gesture of the index and middle fingers.

== Coaching career ==
=== New York Yankees (1969–1979) ===
Howard returned to the Yankees the following year, where he served as first-base coach from 1969 to 1979. He was the first black coach in the American League. The team won the AL pennant in 1976 and the World Series in 1977 and 1978. During a game against the Boston Red Sox at Fenway Park in June 1977, Howard and Yogi Berra were peacemakers during a dugout incident between Yankees player Reggie Jackson and Yankees manager Billy Martin.

After Howard's coaching career ended, he became an administrative assistant with the Yankees; however, that position did not last long due to declining health.

== Death ==
Howard was diagnosed with myocarditis, a rare heart disease that causes rapid heart failure. He was considering a heart transplant, but his condition quickly deteriorated. After staying a week at Columbia Presbyterian Hospital in New York City, Howard died of the heart ailment at age 51 on December 14, 1980. He was interred at George Washington Memorial Park in Paramus, New Jersey.

Red Smith, a columnist for The New York Times, reacted by writing, "The Yankees' organization lost more class on the weekend than George Steinbrenner could buy in 10 years."

== Legacy ==
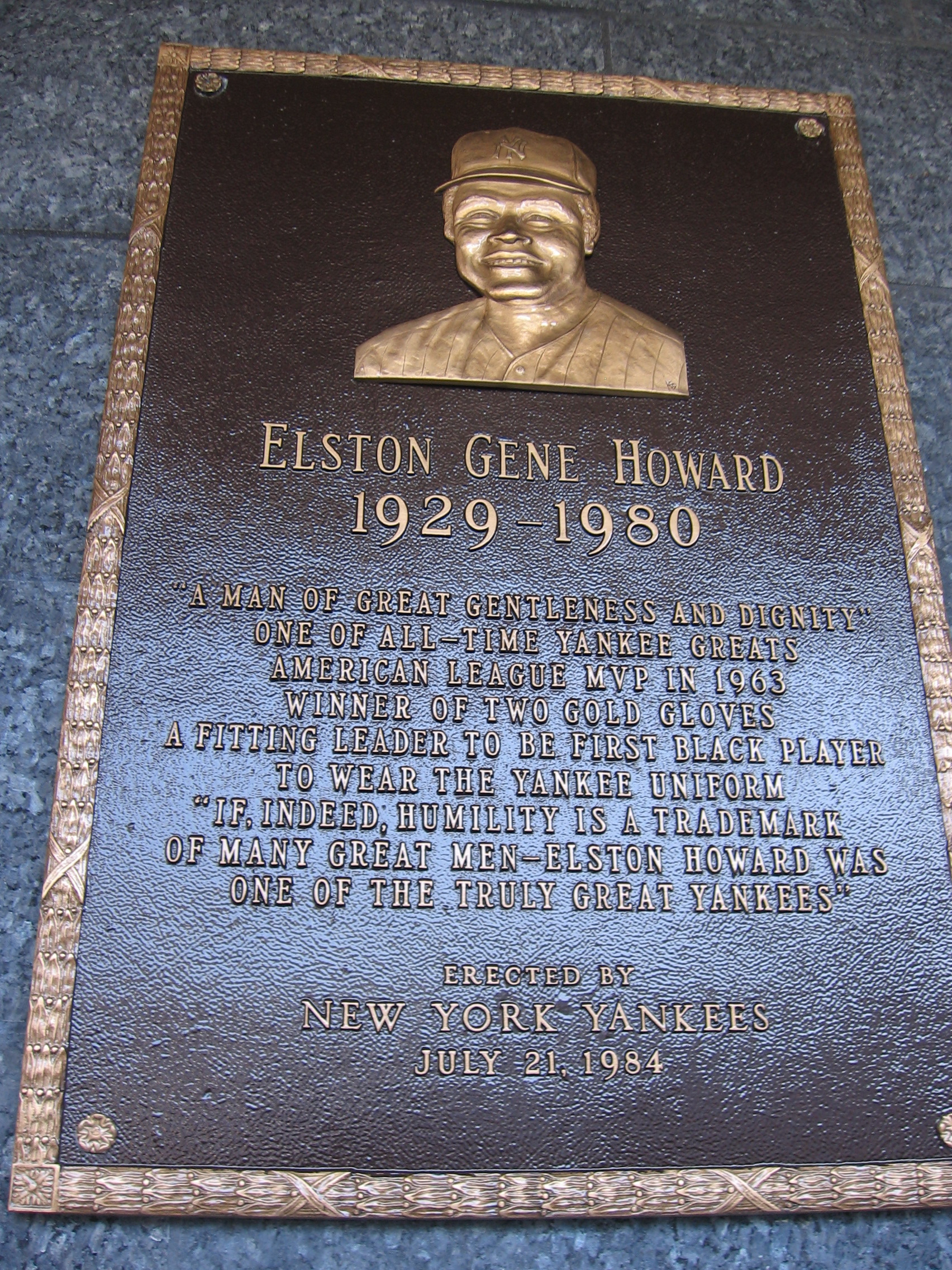
Elston Howard's plaque in Monument Park.

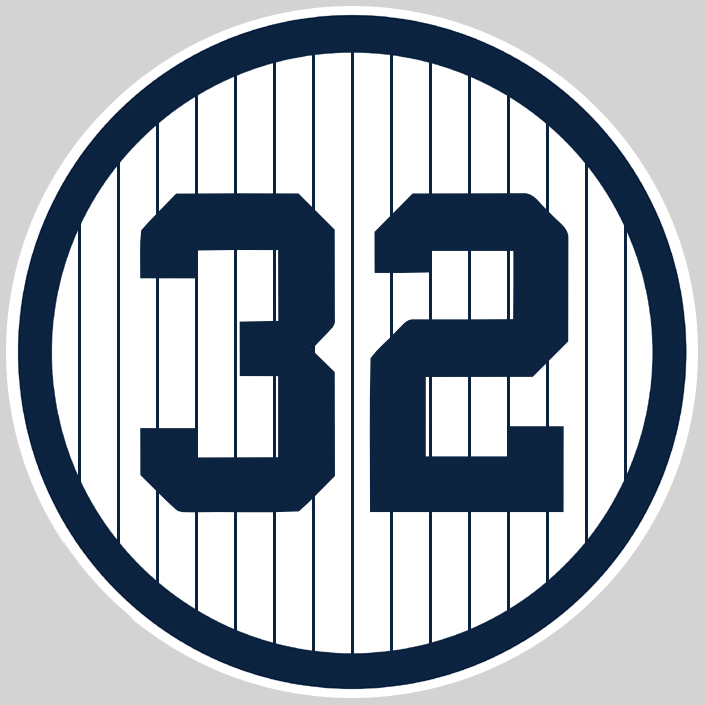
Elston Howard's number 32 was retired by the New York Yankees in 1984.

In Howard's memory, the Yankees wore black armbands on their sleeve during the 1981 season. On July 21, 1984, the Yankees retired Howard's uniform number 32 and dedicated a plaque in his honor for Monument Park at Yankee Stadium. On that day the Yankees also bestowed the same honors to Roger Maris who, unlike Howard, was still living. Howard's plaque describes him as "A man of great gentleness and dignity" and "one of the truly great Yankees."

Howard is credited with inventing the batting "doughnut", a circular lead weight with a rubber shell used by batters in the on-deck circle by placing it around a bat to make it feel heavier, so that it will feel lighter at the plate and easier to swing. Its widespread use caused the discontinuation of the practice of hitters swinging multiple bats at the same time while waiting to hit. Howard helped two New Jersey entrepreneurs, Frank Hamilton and Vince Salvucci, to market the bat weight and lent his name to the product.

In 2020, the baseball field on the former site of Yankee Stadium was renamed in Howard's honor. The field sits directly across the street from the new Stadium.

Howard was portrayed by Bobby Hosea in the 2001 film 61* and in the 2014 Broadway play Bronx Bombers.

His great-nephew is NBA player Josh Hart, who has described him as a role model.

== See also ==
- List of first black Major League Baseball players
- List of Negro league baseball players who played in Major League Baseball
