= 1958 World Series =

1958 Major League Baseball championship series

Team (Wins)	Managers	Season
New York Yankees (4)	Casey Stengel	92–62, .597, GA: 10
Milwaukee Braves (3)	Fred Haney	92–62, .597, GA: 8
- Dates: October 1–9
- Venue(s): County Stadium (Milwaukee); Yankee Stadium (New York)
- MVP: Bob Turley (New York)
- Umpires: Al Barlick (NL), Charlie Berry (AL), Tom Gorman (NL), Red Flaherty (AL), Bill Jackowski (NL: outfield only), Frank Umont (AL: outfield only)
- Hall of Famers: Umpire: Al Barlick; Yankees: Casey Stengel (manager); Yogi Berra; Whitey Ford; Mickey Mantle; Enos Slaughter; Braves: Hank Aaron; Eddie Mathews; Red Schoendienst; Warren Spahn

Broadcast
- Television: NBC
- TV announcers: Curt Gowdy and Mel Allen
- Radio: NBC
- Radio announcers: Bob Wolff and Earl Gillespie

The 1958 World Series was the championship series of Major League Baseball's (MLB) 1958 season. The 55th edition of the World Series, it was a best-of-seven playoff that matched the American League (AL) champion New York Yankees and the National League (NL) champion and defending World Series champion Milwaukee Braves. In a reversal from 1957, the Yankees defeated the Braves in seven games to win their 18th title, and their seventh in 10 years. With that victory, the Yankees became only the second team in Major League Baseball history to come back from a 3–1 deficit to win a best-of-seven World Series; the first was the Pittsburgh Pirates in 1925 (the 1903 Boston Americans came back from a 3–1 deficit in a best-of-nine affair). These teams would meet again in the fall classic 38 years later—by that time, the Braves had moved to Atlanta. As of 2026, this is the most recent World Series featuring the two previous Series winning teams.

== Background ==
This was the first year New Yorkers had only one local team to root for; both the Giants and the Dodgers were now playing their home games more than 3,000 miles (4,800 km) away (in San Francisco and Los Angeles respectively). Both returnees to the Series had no problems repeating as league champions during the regular season. Milwaukee coasted to an eight-game lead over the Pittsburgh Pirates in the National League and the Yanks bested the Chicago White Sox by ten games in the American. With no pennant race in either league, managers Casey Stengel of the Yankees and Fred Haney of the Braves could rest their aces in preparation for an exciting repeat of the 1957 World Series.

== Summary ==
AL New York Yankees (4) vs. NL Milwaukee Braves (3)

Game	Date	Score	Location	Time	Attendance
1	October 1	New York Yankees – 3, Milwaukee Braves – 4 (10)	County Stadium	3:09	46,367
2	October 2	New York Yankees – 5, Milwaukee Braves – 13	County Stadium	2:43	46,367
3	October 4	Milwaukee Braves – 0, New York Yankees – 4	Yankee Stadium	2:42	71,599
4	October 5	Milwaukee Braves – 3, New York Yankees – 0	Yankee Stadium	2:17	71,563
5	October 6	Milwaukee Braves – 0, New York Yankees – 7	Yankee Stadium	2:19	65,279
6	October 8	New York Yankees – 4, Milwaukee Braves – 3 (10)	County Stadium	3:07	46,367
7	October 9	New York Yankees – 6, Milwaukee Braves – 2	County Stadium	2:31	46,367

== Matchups ==
=== Game 1 ===
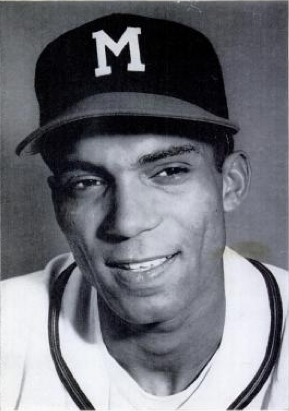
Bill Bruton

October 1, 1958 1:00 pm (CST) at County Stadium in Milwaukee, Wisconsin
Team	1	2	3	4	5	6	7	8	9	10	R	H	E
New York	0	0	0	1	2	0	0	0	0	0	3	8	1
Milwaukee	0	0	0	2	0	0	0	1	0	1	4	10	0
WP: Warren Spahn (1–0) LP: Ryne Duren (0–1); Home runs: NYY: Bill Skowron (1), Hank Bauer (1); MIL: None

Casey Stengel called on 14-game winner Whitey Ford (14–7, 2.01) to start Game 1. Although teammate Bob Turley had a better regular season record at 21–7, the experienced, perennial winning southpaw Ford had five post-season victories under his belt. Fred Haney countered with a lefty of his own, 22-game winner Warren Spahn.

Bill Skowron started the scoring with a home run in the top of the fourth inning, but the Braves came storming back with two of their own in the bottom of the frame. Hank Aaron walked and quickly took second on a Yogi Berra passed ball. When Joe Adcock grounded out to third, Aaron held second but advanced to third on Wes Covington's groundout. Then came three straight singles, Del Crandall to left scoring Aaron, Andy Pafko to center, and Warren Spahn to left-center scoring Crandall, to put the Braves up by one.

In the top of the fifth, Spahn retired Tony Kubek on a flyout to left but walked the opposing pitcher, Ford. Leadoff hitter Hank Bauer then deposited a Spahn fastball into the left-field bleachers to give the Yankees a 3–2 lead. Milwaukee would tie the game in the eighth on an Eddie Mathews walk, Aaron double and sac-fly by Wes Covington on a deep fly-out to Mickey Mantle in left-center.

With no runs in the ninth, extra-innings were played, the Yankees going down 1–2–3 with Spahn still on the hill for the Braves. Ryne Duren, who came into the game to pitch the eighth inning, took his turn at-bat in the 10th and grounded out to the pitcher. Aaron started the bottom of the 10th by striking out and was barely thrown out at first base by Yogi Berra on a dropped third strike. Adcock followed with a clean single to center but Covington made the second out on a fly-out to left. Crandall then singled up the middle, sending Adcock to second base. Bill Bruton, who came into the game pinch-hitting for Pafko in the ninth, lined a single into right-center, scoring Adcock with the game-winning run.

=== Game 2 ===
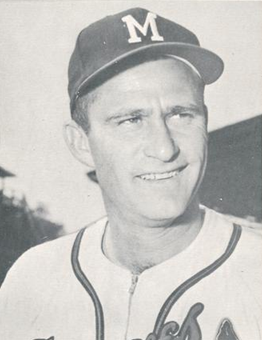
Lew Burdette

October 2, 1958 1:00 pm (CST) at County Stadium in Milwaukee, Wisconsin
Team	1	2	3	4	5	6	7	8	9	R	H	E
New York	1	0	0	1	0	0	0	0	3	5	7	0
Milwaukee	7	1	0	0	0	0	2	3	X	13	15	1
WP: Lew Burdette (1–0) LP: Bob Turley (0–1); Home runs: NYY: Mickey Mantle 2 (2), Hank Bauer (2); MIL: Bill Bruton (1), Lew Burdette (1)

Lew Burdette (20–10, 2.91), who won three games in the 1957 World Series, took the mound for the Braves while the Yankees went with righty Bob Turley (21–7, 2.91), who won 20 games for the only time in his career during the regular season.

Burdette started shakily, giving up a leadoff single to Hank Bauer. Eddie Mathews fielded a grounder by Gil McDougald but threw wide to the first, putting runners on second and third. Mickey Mantle was intentionally walked, loading the bases for cleanup hitter Elston Howard. Howard's groundout forced Mantle at second while Bauer came in from third with the game's first run. Burdette got the next batter, Yogi Berra, to ground into an inning ending 4–6–3 double-play; Red Schoendienst, to Johnny Logan, to Frank Torre.

A shakier Bob Turley would last only a third of an inning. The Braves lit up the scoreboard with seven first inning runs, sparked by a leadoff Bill Bruton home run; he had hit just three in the season. Schoendienst doubled to right, Hank Aaron walked and dependable Wes Covington singled home a run to right-center. Mid-season pickup Duke Maas relieved Turley to get Frank Torre to fly to right for the second out. Del Crandall walked, loading the bases, with Johnny Logan keeping up the onslaught with a two-run single. With the score already 4–1, pitcher Burdette helped his own cause with a three-run homer that left-fielder Howard thought he had a bead on, only to crash into the fence. Burdette was just the sixth pitcher (to date) with a World Series home run. Norm Siebern was summoned to take over for Howard and Johnny Kucks came in to pitch to try to stop the bleeding. The tenth batter of the inning, Bruton, lined to short but the damage was done as the Braves were staked to a 7–1 lead.

Milwaukee added to its lead in the second inning on another Covington single, this time scoring Eddie Mathews. Things would quiet down a little; Mickey Mantle's shot over the center-field fence in the fourth was the only other scoring until the seventh, when the Braves would score twice more and then thrice more in the eighth. The Yankees found some life in the top of the ninth, scoring three runs off a tiring Burdette. Hank Bauer led off with a home run, followed by a Gil McDougald single to left and then Mantle's second homer of the game, into the left-center field bleachers made it 13–5. Burdette showed some tenacity by retiring Berra, Bill Skowron, and Bobby Richardson, in order, for the win and a 2–0 series lead.

=== Game 3 ===
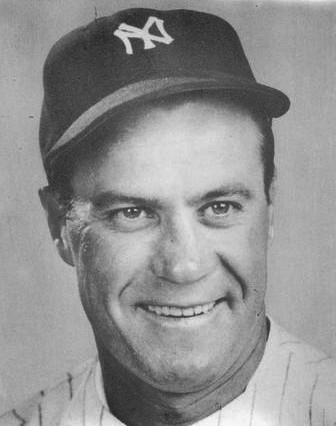
Hank Bauer

October 4, 1958 1:00 pm (ET) at Yankee Stadium in Bronx, New York
Team	1	2	3	4	5	6	7	8	9	R	H	E
Milwaukee	0	0	0	0	0	0	0	0	0	0	6	0
New York	0	0	0	0	2	0	2	0	X	4	4	0
WP: Don Larsen (1–0) LP: Bob Rush (0–1) Sv: Ryne Duren (1); Home runs: MIL: None; NYY: Hank Bauer (3)

Arriving at the Bronx for Games 3 through 5, the Yankees found themselves at home in hopes of their first win in this Series. Milwaukee was shut down on a finely pitched game by Don Larsen with a little help from reliever Ryne Duren.

The Yankees needed this win to stay within striking distance of the seemingly run-away Braves. Hank Bauer drove in all the Yankees' runs, going 3–for–4 with four runs batted in and scoring once. Bauer singled in Norm Siebern and Gil McDougald in the fifth, to extend his Series hitting streak to 17 games, and then in the seventh hit a 400-foot (120 m) two-run homer into the left-field stands. Larsen went seven innings on a six-hitter, striking out eight with three walks. Duren closed the game for his first save, pitching two scoreless innings with three walks and a strikeout. Bob Rush pitched well for the Braves, but his loss helped the Yanks get back into the Series.

=== Game 4 ===
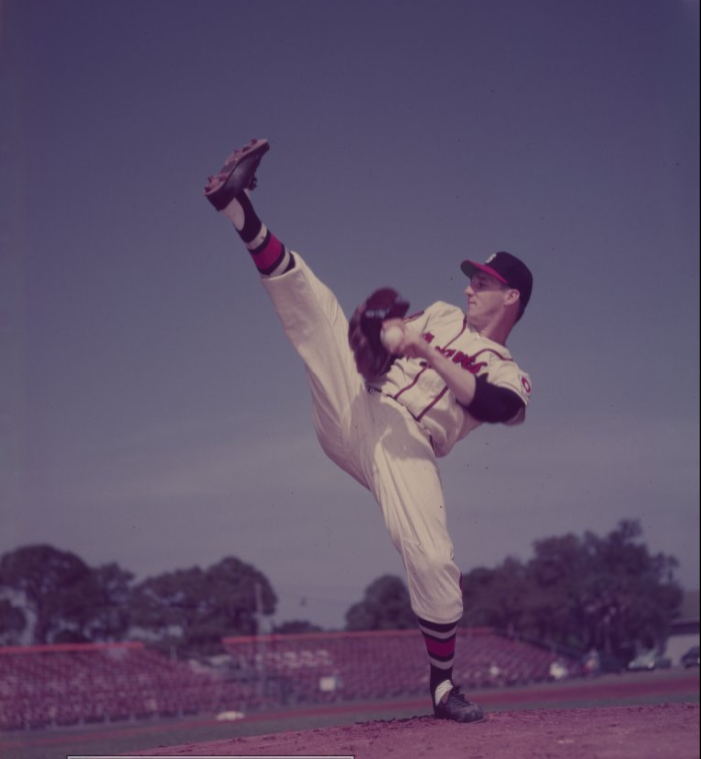
Warren Spahn

October 5, 1958 2:00 pm (ET) at Yankee Stadium in Bronx, New York
Team	1	2	3	4	5	6	7	8	9	R	H	E
Milwaukee	0	0	0	0	0	1	1	1	0	3	9	0
New York	0	0	0	0	0	0	0	0	0	0	2	1
WP: Warren Spahn (2–0) LP: Whitey Ford (0–1)

Warren Spahn was at his much-needed best, winning Game 4 3–0 on a two-hit shutout over Yankee ace Whitey Ford. New York left-fielder Norm Siebern (playing for the injured Elston Howard), had trouble fielding with the afternoon sun blazing, losing fly balls in the sixth and eighth innings, accounting for two of Milwaukee's three runs.

It was a much-heralded pitching duel until the top of the sixth when Red Schoendienst led off tripling into deep left-center, the ball slicing between Mickey Mantle in center and Siebern in left. Tony Kubek, who had 28 errors during the season, let a Johnny Logan grounder slip through his legs for an error, letting in the game's first run. In the seventh, Spahn blooped a single to left to score Del Crandall, who was on third after Andy Pafko doubled to right. In the eighth, Logan was credited with a ground-rule double when Siebern lost a fly-ball in the sun. Eddie Mathews followed with a double off the right-center wall, scoring Logan with the game's final run.

This was the Braves’ last victory in a postseason game until Game 2 of the 1991 NLCS.

=== Game 5 ===
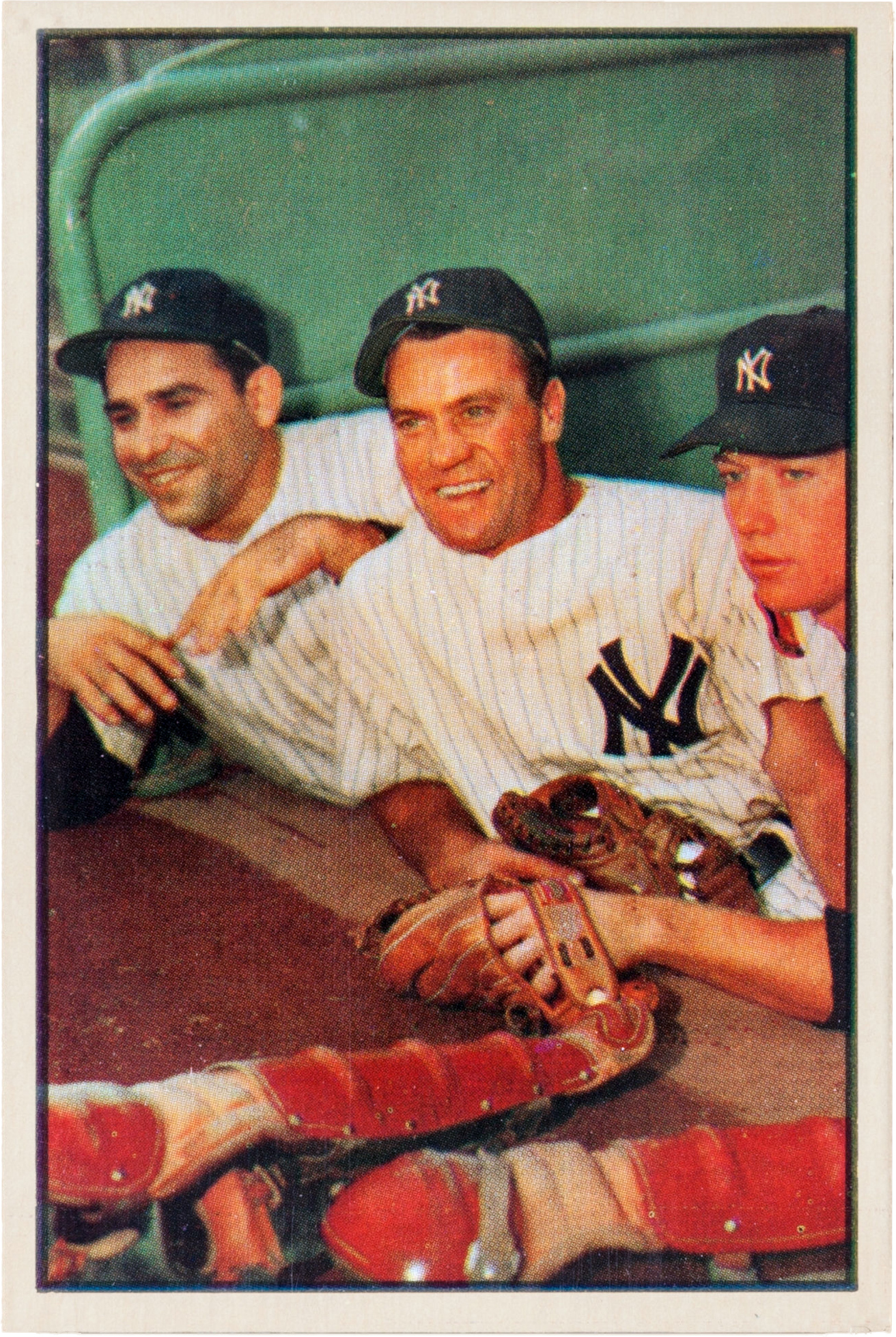
Yogi Berra, Hank Bauer, and Mickey Mantle

October 6, 1958 1:00 pm (ET) at Yankee Stadium in Bronx, New York
Team	1	2	3	4	5	6	7	8	9	R	H	E
Milwaukee	0	0	0	0	0	0	0	0	0	0	5	0
New York	0	0	1	0	0	6	0	0	X	7	10	0
WP: Bob Turley (1–1) LP: Lew Burdette (1–1); Home runs: MIL: None; NYY: Gil McDougald (1)

Game 2 starters, loser Bob Turley and winner Lew Burdette, returned with quite different results. Elston Howard also returned to take his spot in left field back from the ineffective Norm Siebern.

The game did not start out very promising for the Yankees as the first six batters were retired without much fanfare. The Braves didn't fare much better as a walk and a single by Schoendienst in the third was all they could muster. Second baseman Gil McDougald would open up the scoring in the bottom of the third with a home run into the screen next to the left-field foul pole. Turley kept cruising retiring the side in order in the fourth and fifth until his Yankee teammates opened the floodgates with a six-run sixth. Burdette could only get one out in the inning giving up five earned runs before being relieved by Juan Pizarro.

Hank Bauer would lead off with a single to left. After Jerry Lumpe struck out bunting a third strike foul, Mickey Mantle singled to left-center advancing Bauer to third. Yogi Berra doubled into the right-field corner scoring Bauer, Mantle stopping at third. Howard was intentionally passed loading the bases but Moose Skowron kept the rally going with a short single to right scoring just Mantle. Pizzaro relieved Burdette, who was responsible for all baserunners, and was greeted with a two-run scoring double into the Milwaukee bullpen by Gil McDougald. With runners on second and third, Tony Kubek struck out but had to be thrown out by Del Crandall at first. Turley stayed in the game to hit and delivered a single to left scoring the sixth run, Skowron, and the seventh, McDougald. Hank Bauer was the third strikeout victim in the inning but six runs had crossed the plate. The Braves would put runners on in the seventh, eighth, and ninth innings but fail to score, giving the Yanks a 7–0 victory. Milwaukee still led 3–2 in the Series.

=== Game 6 ===
Gil McDougald

October 8, 1958 1:00 pm (CST) at County Stadium in Milwaukee, Wisconsin
Team	1	2	3	4	5	6	7	8	9	10	R	H	E
New York	1	0	0	0	0	1	0	0	0	2	4	10	1
Milwaukee	1	1	0	0	0	0	0	0	0	1	3	10	4
WP: Ryne Duren (1–1) LP: Warren Spahn (2–1) Sv: Bob Turley (1); Home runs: NYY: Hank Bauer (4), Gil McDougald (2); MIL: None

Milwaukee needed a split of two games at home to repeat as champions, but manager Fred Haney acted like his team had its back to the wall. Rather than start Spahn on three days' rest per his normal routine, the 37-year-old warhorse returned one day early. That also meant that Burdette would do the same if the series went to a seventh game. In the process, Haney bypassed veteran Bob Rush, who had an impressive 4-2 record and 1.81 earned run average in the final two months of the regular season and was effective again in Game 3, albeit in a loss.

In the top of the first, Spahn recorded two quick outs. Hank Bauer, who would be the Series' top hitter with a .323 batting average, four home runs and eight RBI, stepped to the plate and slammed his fourth homer into the left-field bleachers for an early 1–0 lead. The Braves answered with a run in the bottom of the inning on a Red Schoendienst single, a sacrifice bunt by Johnny Logan, and a run-scoring single to left by Hank Aaron. Spahn settled in and retired the Yankees without a hit in the second.

Also pitching on two days' rest, Ford quickly withered in the bottom of the second. After striking out Del Crandall, Wes Covington singled to center on a trap by center fielder Mickey Mantle. Andy Pafko singled to right, advancing Covington to third. Spahn singled to right-center, scoring Covington for a 2–1 lead. An exhausted Ford walked Schoendienst, loading the bases, and Casey Stengel had seen enough, motioning to the bullpen for reliever Art Ditmar. Ditmar faced one batter, Logan, who flied out to Elston Howard, who in turn threw home with a perfect throw to Yogi Berra, doubling up Pafko trying to score on a sac-fly. The RBI single by Spahn would be the last run scored against Ford in the World Series for 33 2/3 innings.

Milwaukee held on to the lead until the top of the sixth inning when the Yankees tied the score on a defensive replacement miscue. Bill Bruton had entered the game to play center for Pafko. After Mantle singled just over the reach of shortstop Logan's glove, Howard followed with single to center. Bruton fumbled the ball, allowing Mantle to reach third on the error. Berra hit a sacrifice fly to center, Mantle scoring after the catch, to tie the game at two.

Spahn was still on the mound for the Braves going into the 10th, despite throwing 290 innings in the regular season and another 28 in the post-season to that point. Gil McDougald, who was having a fine series himself, led off by hitting a Spahn fastball over the left-field fence. Bauer almost went back-to-back but Bruton made the catch in deep center. Mantle grounded to second for the second out but Howard and Berra followed with singles, setting up runners on first and third. Haney called on Don McMahon to replace Spahn. Moose Skowron struck a single to right, scoring Howard for a two-run lead. Pitcher Ryne Duren stayed in the game to hit but struck out to end the inning.

The Braves made some noise in the bottom of the 10th, but it wasn't enough to overcome the Yankee lead. Logan, on first after a walk and with two outs, went to second on defensive indifference (not a stolen base). The ever-dependable Aaron singled to left, scoring Logan, and the Braves were within one run of tying the game. Joe Adcock then singled, sending Aaron to third. Bob Turley came in to relieve Duren and Felix Mantilla pinch-ran for Adcock. With two on and two outs, Frank Torre, pinch-hitting for Del Crandall, lined out to McDougald at the very edge of the outfield grass to end the game and force Game 7.

=== Game 7 ===
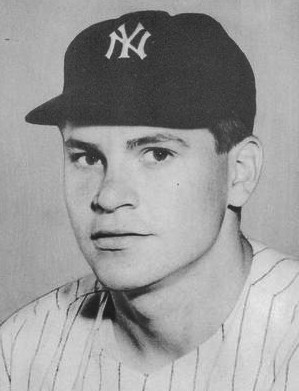
Bob Turley

October 9, 1958 1:00 pm (CST) at County Stadium in Milwaukee, Wisconsin
Team	1	2	3	4	5	6	7	8	9	R	H	E
New York	0	2	0	0	0	0	0	4	0	6	8	0
Milwaukee	1	0	0	0	0	1	0	0	0	2	5	2
WP: Bob Turley (2–1) LP: Lew Burdette (1–2); Home runs: NYY: Bill Skowron (2); MIL: Del Crandall (1)

For the fourth straight year, the World Series went the distance. Yankee manager Casey Stengel again chose Don Larsen to start Game 7. Larsen had only lasted 2 1/3 innings starting Game 7 in the 1957 World Series and once again lasted 2 1/3 innings in 1958. Braves right-hander Lew Burdette, who pitched a complete game win in Game 2 but gave up six runs in a Game 5 loss, started for the third time in the series.

The Yankees failed to score in the first while the Braves tallied a single run on some lack of control by Larsen. Red Schoendienst led off with a single to left, Bill Bruton walked and Frank Torre sacrificed up both runners, Jerry Lumpe to Gil McDougald, who was covering first base. Hank Aaron walked loading the bases; things looking pretty good for the Braves thus far. Wes Covington grounded out to first but Schoendienst scored on the play. Eddie Mathews took an intentional pass, but Del Crandall struck out to end the threat.

The Yankees struck back. Cleanup hitter Yogi Berra led off with a walk. Slow-footed but hustling Elston Howard laid down a sacrifice and, incredibly, was called safe on a poorly tossed throw by Torre to pitcher Burdette. Jerry Lumpe grounded again to Torre, who again threw too high to Burdette for another error, loading the bases. The left-handed hitting Torre got the start in place of veteran right-hander Joe Adcock. The next batter, Bill Skowron, forced Lumpe at second, scoring Berra and moving Howard to third. Tony Kubek lifted a sacrifice fly to left, scoring Howard giving the Yankees a 2–1 lead, which held up until the sixth.

Two singles in the bottom of the third brought Stengel out to replace Larsen with a short-rested Bob Turley. The stocky right-hander escaped a bases-loaded situation and pitched superb ball the rest of the way. As in Game 6, the score was tied at two after six innings, when Del Crandall homered into the left-field stands with two outs, giving Braves fans a reason to cheer and promise of another title.

But that hope would fade as the Yankees came to bat in the top of the eighth inning. With tiring Lew Burdette looking for another complete-game victory, they started an improbable two-out rally. After a McDougald fly out and Mickey Mantle looking at a called third strike, Berra doubled off the wall in the right-field corner. Howard followed with a run-scoring bouncer to center field. Andy Carey singled off Eddie Mathews' glove before Bill Skowron then delivered the back-breaker, a three-run homer to left-center field, to cap a storybook comeback. Other than a lead-off walk to Eddie Mathews and a 2-out pinch-hit single by Joe Adcock in the ninth, Milwaukee went quietly to sleep, and the Yankees had their 18th World Championship.

Hank Bauer (a nine-Series veteran) led with most runs scored (six), most hits (ten), most home runs (four) and most runs batted in (eight). He also paced the victors with a .323 average. Despite less-than-stellar stats in his first four Classics (7-for-57 with a .123 avg.), he combined for 18 hits, six home runs, 14 RBI and a .290 average against the Braves in 1957 and 1958. Turley became the first relief pitcher to be named World Series MVP, recording a save in Game 6, while posting a 2–1 record in both starting and relieving, which consisted of a starting loss in Game 2, a starting win in Game 5, and a relieving win in Game 7. Turley finished the Series with 13 strikeouts, five earned runs off 10 hits, and a 2.76 ERA in 16 1/3 total innings pitched.

1958 marked the end of a tight run of World Series contests, with this being the fourth (and last) consecutive series to go the distance of seven games. In over a half century since 1958, there has never been a four-year span of seven-game series in a row.

Through 2025, this is the last time the Yankees won a World Series Game 7 on the road and the last championship won with a Republican in the White House. Only in Milwaukee since the Dodgers and Giants left town.

== Composite line score ==
1958 World Series (4–3): New York Yankees (A.L.) over Milwaukee Braves (N.L.)

Team	1	2	3	4	5	6	7	8	9	10	R	H	E
New York Yankees	2	2	1	2	4	7	2	4	3	2	29	49	3
Milwaukee Braves	9	2	0	2	0	2	3	5	0	2	25	60	7
Total attendance: 393,909 Average attendance: 56,273; Winning player's share: $8,759 Losing player's share: $5,896

== Records ==
- Eddie Mathews struck out 11 times, a World Series record that Wayne Garrett tied in 1973. The co-records stood until 1980, when Willie Wilson of the Kansas City Royals struck out 12 times.
- The Braves struck out 56 times, a new World Series record. In addition to Mathews' 11 strikeouts, Del Crandall also struck out 10 times, making it the first time two different players from the same team struck out 10 or more times in a single World Series.
- This was Casey Stengel's seventh world championship, which tied him with Joe McCarthy for the most World Series won. It would also be Stengel's last.
- The 3–1 deficit overcome by the New York Yankees was the first in a best-of-seven by an American League team. The only previous instance was by the National League's Pittsburgh Pirates in 1925.

== Aftermath ==
The Yankees would return to the World Series two years later, but were shockingly upset by the Pittsburgh Pirates in seven games after being six outs away from the championship in Game 7. They would win their next championship in 1961 over the Cincinnati Reds in five games.

This was the Braves’ last postseason appearance during their time in Milwaukee, as the team would move to Atlanta in 1966. The Braves made the inaugural MLB Postseason field in 1969, but were swept by the eventual World Series champion New York Mets in the NLCS. The Braves would eventually return to the World Series in 1991, but lost to the Minnesota Twins in seven games. They would eventually win the championship again in 1995 over the Cleveland Indians in six games.

This was the second most recent World Series played in Milwaukee. The expansion Milwaukee Brewers would reach the World Series in 1982, only to lose to the St. Louis Cardinals in seven games after being eleven outs away from the championship in Game 7, which is the most last Fall Classic played in Milwaukee until the 2026 World Series.

== See also ==
- 1958 Japan Series
