= Frank House (baseball) =

American baseball player (1930–2005)

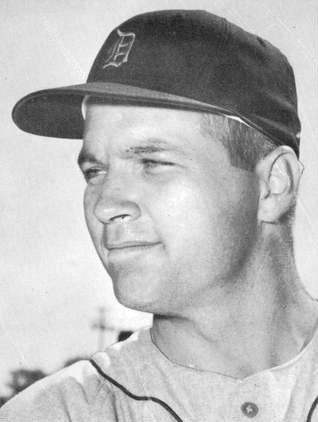
- House in 1957
- Catcher
- Born: February 18, 1930; Bessemer, Alabama, U.S.
- Died: March 13, 2005 (aged 75); Birmingham, Alabama, U.S.
- Batted: Left Threw: Right

MLB debut
- July 21, 1950, for the Detroit Tigers

Last MLB appearance
- September 25, 1961, for the Detroit Tigers

MLB statistics
- Batting average: .248
- Home runs: 47
- Runs batted in: 235
- Stats at Baseball Reference

Teams
- Detroit Tigers (1950–1951, 1954–1957); Kansas City Athletics (1958–1959); Cincinnati Reds (1960); Detroit Tigers (1961)

Henry Franklin House (February 18, 1930 – March 13, 2005), nicknamed "Pig", was an American catcher in Major League Baseball who played with the Detroit Tigers (1950–51, 1954–57, 1961), Kansas City Athletics (1958–59) and Cincinnati Reds (1960). He batted left-handed and threw right-handed.

In a 10-season career, House posted a .248 batting average with 47 home runs and 235 RBI in 653 games. As a catcher, in 580 games he compiled a .988 fielding percentage with 2934 putouts, 258 assists, and 34 errors in 2934 total chances.

A native of Bessemer, Alabama, House signed out of Hueytown High School with the Tigers in 1948 for one of the biggest bonuses of the time – $75,000 and two automobiles, according to news reports. House made his debut in 1950 at 20 years of age. He earned his nickname as a baby, when his family used to say he was "big as a house" and he twisted "big" into "pig". As a player, he stood 6 feet 1 inch (1.85 m) tall and weighed 190 pounds (86 kg). His mother-in-law said the nickname came about when he came in very dirty from playing outside and his mother told him "you're dirty as a little pig, Frank."

House was known as a solid defensive catcher with a fast release and a strong arm. He also called a good game and was great at blocking the plate. His most productive season came in 1955 when he hit .259 with 15 home runs and 53 RBI in 102 games. On April 21, 1958, House scored two runs as a pinch-hitter in an eight-run eighth inning, in a 9-4 Athletics victory over the Cleveland Indians. House's feat was only the sixth such occurrence in major league history.

House later served in the Alabama Legislature, where he was instrumental in the creation of the Alabama Sports Hall of Fame in 1967. He was inducted into the Hall of Fame in 1975 and was honored in 2004 when the Hall instituted the Frank "Pig" House Award to recognize contributors to state sports. A municipal golf course in his home town of Bessemer, Alabama, bears his name. He was a multi-star athlete at Hueytown High School when he signed his pro contract.

House died in Birmingham, Alabama, at age 75. His interment was in Bessemer's Cedar Hill Cemetery.
