= Kent Hadley =

American baseball player (1934-2005)

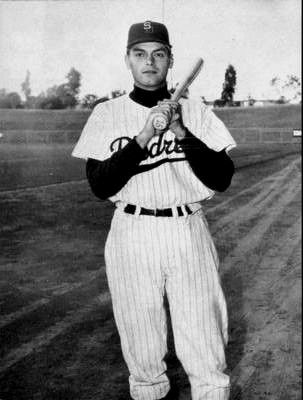
- First baseman
- Born: December 17, 1934; Pocatello, Idaho, U.S.
- Died: March 10, 2005 (aged 70); Pocatello, Idaho, U.S.
- Batted: Left Threw: Left

MLB debut
- September 14, 1958, for the Kansas City Athletics

Last MLB appearance
- August 21, 1960, for the New York Yankees

MLB statistics
- Batting average: .242
- Home runs: 14
- Runs batted in: 50
- Stats at Baseball Reference

Teams
- Kansas City Athletics (1958–1959); New York Yankees (1960); Nankai Hawks (1962–1967)

Kent William Hadley (December 17, 1934 – March 10, 2005) was an American professional baseball player. A free-swinging first baseman, he played three years in Major League Baseball (1958–60) and six seasons in Nippon Professional Baseball (1962–67).

== Playing career ==
=== United States ===
Hadley led the Southern Association with 34 home runs in 1958. At the time the 23-year-old prospect was playing for the Little Rock Travelers. A year later he was the starting first baseman for the Kansas City A's. That December he was part of the trade that sent Roger Maris from Kansas City to the New York Yankees. He spent the 1960 season mostly on the Yankee bench, appearing in just 55 games and collecting just 70 plate appearances. The following year Hadley played for the minor league San Diego Padres (no relation to the later major league team of that name). In 1962 he went to play ball in Japan.

=== Japan ===
Hadley became the first foreigner to homer in his first at-bat in Japan. For the Nankai Hawks, Kent went deep off of Junichi Nakajima on May 1, 1962, in Heiwadai Stadium. Overall, Kent had an unimpressive season at the plate, hitting just .266/.296/.414. The Hawks brought him back in 1963 and he improved drastically, cranking out 30 long balls and batting .295/.341/.517 with 84 RBI. He made the Pacific League All-Star team and had his best season in Japan. In 1964, Hadley hit .263/.328/.470 with 29 home runs and a league-high 99 strikeouts. He hit a dramatic game-ending game-winning home run in game 4 of the Japan Series that year, taking Minoru Murayama deep. The blow helped the Hawks to a 4-3 Series win over the Hanshin Tigers – it would be the last Japan Series title for Nankai. As Nankai's 1B in 1965, Kent batted .239/.274/.492, again cracking 29 home runs and driving in 86 runners. His power began to fade the next season but he picked up his average as his line read .279/.340/.443 with 18 HR. In his final season for the Hawks, Hadley hit just .213/.266/.341 with 14 homers.

== Personal life ==
Hadley said one of the proudest parts of his career was playing for Rod Dedeaux, Casey Stengel and Kazuto Tsuruoka, a famous trio of managers in different settings. Hadley was born and died in Pocatello, Idaho.
