= List of Major League Baseball All-Star Game venues =

The first All-Star Game was held as part of the 1933 World's Fair at Comiskey Park and was the brainchild of Arch Ward, then sports editor for the Chicago Tribune. Initially intended to be a one-time event, its great success resulted in making the game an annual event, with some years (1959–1962) having two All-Star Games.

== Venue selection ==
The venue for each All-Star Game is chosen by an MLB selection committee. This choice may be made to commemorate a particular historical occasion, the opening of a new ballpark, or a significant milestone. The criteria for choosing the venue are subjective; for the most part, cities with new parks and cities who have not hosted the game in a long time – or ever – tend to be favored. The venues among the major league franchises: between 1964 and 2015, five teams hosted three times, 13 teams twice, ten teams once, and two teams not at all. The "home team" is the league in which the host franchise plays its games. Through the 2026 season, the American League has hosted 46 times, and the National League has hosted 50 times. Traditionally, the game alternates between the two leagues from year to year with six exceptions:

- 1950–1951 (American League)
- 1952–1953 (National League)
- 1959 both games (National League)
- 1960 both games (American League)
- 1961 second game – 1962 first game (American League)
- 2006–2007 (National League)

This tradition was discontinued after the 2015 game.

As of 2026, one Major League Baseball franchise has never hosted an All-Star Game: the Tampa Bay Rays. The Miami Marlins hosted for the first time in 2017 following the 2012 opening of Marlins Park; although Miami was initially scheduled to host in 2000, MLB eventually moved the game to Atlanta. All-Star games have been played in D.C., hosted by both incarnations of the Washington Senators (now known as the Minnesota Twins and as the Texas Rangers), as well as by the Washington Nationals in 2018.

Of the remaining 27 franchises, the New York Mets had gone the longest period without hosting since their sole hosting duty in 1964, but this streak came to an end at 49 years in 2013. During that span, 18 of the remaining 25 teams have hosted an All-Star Game at least twice since 1964: Atlanta Braves (1972 and 2000) Chicago White Sox (1983 and 2003), Cincinnati Reds (1970, 1988, and 2015), Cleveland Indians (1981, 1997, 2019), Detroit Tigers (1971 and 2005), Houston Astros (1968, 1986, and 2004), Kansas City Royals (1973 and 2012), Los Angeles Angels (1967, 1989, and 2010), Milwaukee Brewers (1975 and 2002), Minnesota Twins (1965, 1985, and 2014), New York Yankees (1977 and 2008), Philadelphia Phillies (1976, 1996, & 2026), Pittsburgh Pirates (1974, 1994, and 2006), San Diego Padres (1978, 1992, and 2016), San Francisco Giants (1984 and 2007), Seattle Mariners (1979 and 2001), St. Louis Cardinals (1966 and 2009), and Washington Senators/Texas Rangers (1969 and 1995). The Oakland Athletics are now the team with the longest active hosting drought; they have not hosted since 1987.

New stadiums that have not hosted the All-Star Game in cities that have hosted it previously is: the new Yankee Stadium in New York City.

Future All-Star Games will be played at Wrigley Field in Chicago in 2027 (it will become the third venue to host four Major League Baseball All-Star games after Cleveland Stadium and the first Yankee Stadium) and Oracle Park in San Francisco in 2028.

New York City has hosted it more than any other city, having done so nine times in five different stadiums; as of 2026.

== List of hosts ==
| Date | City | Stadium | Host team | Attendance | Host league |
|---|---|---|---|---|---|
| July 6, 1933 | Chicago | Comiskey Park | Chicago White Sox | 49,200 | American |
| July 10, 1934 | New York City | Polo Grounds | New York Giants | 48,363 | National |
| July 8, 1935 | Cleveland | Cleveland Stadium | Cleveland Indians | 69,812 | American |
| July 7, 1936 | Boston | Braves Field | Boston Bees | 25,556 | National |
| July 7, 1937 | Washington, D.C. | Griffith Stadium | Washington Senators | 31,391 | American |
| July 6, 1938 | Cincinnati | Crosley Field | Cincinnati Reds | 27,067 | National |
| July 11, 1939 | New York City (2) | Yankee Stadium | New York Yankees | 62,892 | American |
| July 9, 1940 | St. Louis | Sportsman's Park | St. Louis Cardinals | 32,373 | National |
| July 8, 1941 | Detroit | Briggs Stadium | Detroit Tigers | 54,674 | American |
| July 6, 1942 | New York City (3) | Polo Grounds (2) | New York Giants (2) | 34,178 | National |
| July 13, 1943 | Philadelphia | Shibe Park | Philadelphia Athletics | 31,938 | American |
| July 11, 1944 | Pittsburgh | Forbes Field | Pittsburgh Pirates | 29,589 | National |
| 1945 | Game canceled due to World War II-related travel restrictions. The game was originally scheduled to be held at Fenway Park in Boston, Massachusetts. | | | | |
| July 9, 1946 | Boston (2) | Fenway Park | Boston Red Sox | 34,906 | American |
| July 8, 1947 | Chicago (2) | Wrigley Field | Chicago Cubs | 41,123 | National |
| July 13, 1948 | St. Louis (2) | Sportsman's Park (2) | St. Louis Browns | 34,009 | American |
| July 12, 1949 | New York City (4) | Ebbets Field | Brooklyn Dodgers | 32,577 | National |
| July 11, 1950 | Chicago (3) | Comiskey Park (2) | Chicago White Sox (2) | 46,127 | American |
| July 10, 1951 | Detroit (2) | Briggs Stadium (2) | Detroit Tigers (2) | 52,075 | American |
| July 8, 1952 | Philadelphia (2) | Shibe Park (2) | Philadelphia Phillies | 32,785 | National |
| July 14, 1953 | Cincinnati (2) | Crosley Field (2) | Cincinnati Redlegs (2) | 30,846 | National |
| July 13, 1954 | Cleveland (2) | Cleveland Stadium (2) | Cleveland Indians (2) | 69,751 | American |
| July 12, 1955 | Milwaukee | County Stadium | Milwaukee Braves | 45,643 | National |
| July 10, 1956 | Washington, D.C. (2) | Griffith Stadium (2) | Washington Senators (2) | 28,843 | American |
| July 9, 1957 | St. Louis (3) | Busch Stadium (3) | St. Louis Cardinals (2) | 30,693 | National |
| July 8, 1958 | Baltimore | Memorial Stadium | Baltimore Orioles | 48,829 | American |
| July 7, 1959 | Pittsburgh (2) | Forbes Field (2) | Pittsburgh Pirates (2) | 35,277 | National |
| August 3, 1959 | Los Angeles | Los Angeles Memorial Coliseum | Los Angeles Dodgers | 55,105 | National |
| July 11, 1960 | Kansas City | Municipal Stadium | Kansas City Athletics | 30,619 | American |
| July 13, 1960 | New York City (5) | Yankee Stadium (2) | New York Yankees (2) | 38,362 | American |
| July 11, 1961 | San Francisco | Candlestick Park | San Francisco Giants | 44,115 | National |
| July 31, 1961 | Boston (3) | Fenway Park (2) | Boston Red Sox (2) | 31,851 | American |
| July 10, 1962 | Washington, D.C. (3) | D.C. Stadium | Washington Senators | 45,480 | American |
| July 30, 1962 | Chicago (4) | Wrigley Field (2) | Chicago Cubs (2) | 38,359 | National |
| July 9, 1963 | Cleveland (3) | Cleveland Stadium (3) | Cleveland Indians (3) | 44,160 | American |
| July 7, 1964 | New York City (6) | Shea Stadium | New York Mets | 50,850 | National |
| July 13, 1965 | Bloomington | Metropolitan Stadium | Minnesota Twins | 46,706 | American |
| July 12, 1966 | St. Louis (4) | Busch Memorial Stadium | St. Louis Cardinals (3) | 49,936 | National |
| July 11, 1967 | Anaheim | Anaheim Stadium | California Angels | 46,309 | American |
| July 9, 1968 | Houston | Astrodome | Houston Astros | 48,321 | National |
| July 23, 1969 | Washington, D.C. (4) | RFK Stadium (2) | Washington Senators (2) | 45,259 | American |
| July 14, 1970 | Cincinnati (3) | Riverfront Stadium | Cincinnati Reds (3) | 51,838 | National |
| July 13, 1971 | Detroit (3) | Tiger Stadium (3) | Detroit Tigers (3) | 53,559 | American |
| July 25, 1972 | Atlanta | Atlanta Stadium | Atlanta Braves | 53,107 | National |
| July 24, 1973 | Kansas City (2) | Royals Stadium | Kansas City Royals | 40,849 | American |
| July 23, 1974 | Pittsburgh (3) | Three Rivers Stadium | Pittsburgh Pirates (3) | 50,706 | National |
| July 15, 1975 | Milwaukee (2) | County Stadium (2) | Milwaukee Brewers | 51,480 | American |
| July 13, 1976 | Philadelphia (3) | Veterans Stadium | Philadelphia Phillies (2) | 63,974 | National |
| July 19, 1977 | New York City (7) | Yankee Stadium (3) | New York Yankees (3) | 56,683 | American |
| July 11, 1978 | San Diego | San Diego Stadium | San Diego Padres | 51,549 | National |
| July 17, 1979 | Seattle | Kingdome | Seattle Mariners | 58,905 | American |
| July 8, 1980 | Los Angeles (2) | Dodger Stadium | Los Angeles Dodgers (2) | 56,088 | National |
| August 9, 1981 | Cleveland (4) | Cleveland Stadium (4) | Cleveland Indians (4) | 72,086 | American |
| July 13, 1982 | Montreal | Olympic Stadium | Montreal Expos | 59,057 | National |
| July 6, 1983 | Chicago (5) | Comiskey Park (3) | Chicago White Sox (3) | 43,801 | American |
| July 10, 1984 | San Francisco (2) | Candlestick Park (2) | San Francisco Giants (2) | 57,756 | National |
| July 16, 1985 | Minneapolis (2) | Hubert H. Humphrey Metrodome | Minnesota Twins (2) | 54,960 | American |
| July 15, 1986 | Houston (2) | Astrodome (2) | Houston Astros (2) | 45,774 | National |
| July 14, 1987 | Oakland | Oakland–Alameda County Coliseum | Oakland Athletics | 49,671 | American |
| July 12, 1988 | Cincinnati (4) | Riverfront Stadium (2) | Cincinnati Reds (4) | 55,837 | National |
| July 11, 1989 | Anaheim (2) | Anaheim Stadium (2) | California Angels (2) | 64,036 | American |
| July 10, 1990 | Chicago (6) | Wrigley Field (3) | Chicago Cubs (3) | 39,071 | National |
| July 9, 1991 | Toronto | SkyDome | Toronto Blue Jays | 52,383 | American |
| July 14, 1992 | San Diego (2) | Jack Murphy Stadium (2) | San Diego Padres (2) | 59,372 | National |
| July 13, 1993 | Baltimore (2) | Oriole Park at Camden Yards | Baltimore Orioles (2) | 48,147 | American |
| July 12, 1994 | Pittsburgh (4) | Three Rivers Stadium (2) | Pittsburgh Pirates (4) | 59,568 | National |
| July 11, 1995 | Arlington | The Ballpark in Arlington | Texas Rangers | 50,920 | American |
| July 9, 1996 | Philadelphia (4) | Veterans Stadium (2) | Philadelphia Phillies (3) | 62,670 | National |
| July 8, 1997 | Cleveland (5) | Jacobs Field | Cleveland Indians (5) | 44,916 | American |
| July 7, 1998 | Denver | Coors Field | Colorado Rockies | 51,267 | National |
| July 13, 1999 | Boston (4) | Fenway Park (3) | Boston Red Sox (3) | 34,187 | American |
| July 11, 2000 | Atlanta (2) | Turner Field | Atlanta Braves (2) | 51,323 | National |
| July 10, 2001 | Seattle (2) | Safeco Field | Seattle Mariners (2) | 47,364 | American |
| July 9, 2002 | Milwaukee (3) | Miller Park | Milwaukee Brewers (2) | 41,871 | National |
| July 15, 2003 | Chicago (7) | U.S. Cellular Field | Chicago White Sox (4) | 47,609 | American |
| July 13, 2004 | Houston (3) | Minute Maid Park | Houston Astros (3) | 41,886 | National |
| July 12, 2005 | Detroit (4) | Comerica Park | Detroit Tigers (4) | 41,617 | American |
| July 11, 2006 | Pittsburgh (5) | PNC Park | Pittsburgh Pirates (5) | 38,904 | National |
| July 10, 2007 | San Francisco (3) | AT&T Park | San Francisco Giants (3) | 43,965 | National |
| July 15, 2008 | New York City (8) | Yankee Stadium (4) | New York Yankees (4) | 55,632 | American |
| July 14, 2009 | St. Louis (5) | Busch Stadium | St. Louis Cardinals (4) | 46,760 | National |
| July 13, 2010 | Anaheim (3) | Angel Stadium of Anaheim (3) | Los Angeles Angels of Anaheim | 45,408 | American |
| July 12, 2011 | Phoenix | Chase Field | Arizona Diamondbacks | 49,033 | National |
| July 10, 2012 | Kansas City (3) | Kauffman Stadium (2) | Kansas City Royals (2) | 40,933 | American |
| July 16, 2013 | New York City (9) | Citi Field | New York Mets (2) | 45,186 | National |
| July 15, 2014 | Minneapolis (3) | Target Field | Minnesota Twins (3) | 41,048 | American |
| July 14, 2015 | Cincinnati (5) | Great American Ball Park | Cincinnati Reds (5) | 43,656 | National |
| July 12, 2016 | San Diego (3) | Petco Park | San Diego Padres (3) | 42,386 | National (Note: Due to NL stadiums being scheduled for 4 consecutive All-Star games, the AL batted second in the 2016 edition despite it being played at an NL stadium to keep the leagues alternating who bats second in each edition. The 2018 game was set to also have this provision before it was changed back to having the league whose stadium is hosting the game bat second.) |
| July 11, 2017 | Miami | Marlins Park | Miami Marlins | 37,188 | National |
| July 17, 2018 | Washington, D.C. (5) | Nationals Park | Washington Nationals (2) | 43,843 | National |
| July 9, 2019 | Cleveland (6) | Progressive Field (2) | Cleveland Indians (6) | 36,747 | American |
| 2020 | Game canceled due to the shortening of the league's 2020 season as a result of the COVID-19 pandemic. The game was originally scheduled to be held at Dodger Stadium in Los Angeles, California; it ended up getting moved back to 2022. | | | | |
| July 13, 2021 | Denver (2) | Coors Field (2) (Note: The 2021 game was originally scheduled to be held at Truist Park in Atlanta, but it was moved in protest of a controversial voting bill by the Georgia State Legislature. Atlanta was later awarded the game for 2025.) | Colorado Rockies (2) | 49,184 | National |
| July 19, 2022 | Los Angeles (3) | Dodger Stadium (2) | Los Angeles Dodgers (3) | 52,518 | National |
| July 11, 2023 | Seattle (3) | T-Mobile Park (2) | Seattle Mariners (3) | 47,159 | American |
| July 16, 2024 | Arlington (2) | Globe Life Field | Texas Rangers (2) | 39,343 | American |
| July 15, 2025 | Atlanta (3) | Truist Park | Atlanta Braves (3) | 41,702 | National |
| July 14, 2026 | Philadelphia (5) | Citizens Bank Park | Philadelphia Phillies (4) | 43,916 | National |
| July 13, 2027 | Chicago (8) | Wrigley Field (4) | Chicago Cubs (4) | | National |
| July 2028 | San Francisco (4) | Oracle Park (2) | San Francisco Giants (4) | | National |

=== Record of host league ===
| Host League | Record |
|---|---|
| National League (Games played in NL stadiums) | 24 Wins, 25 Losses, 1 Tie |
| American League (Games played in AL stadiums) | 24 Wins, 21 Losses, 1 Tie |
| Total | AL: 49 Wins, NL: 45 Wins, 2 Ties |

== Various statistics ==
=== Times hosted by city ===
| City | Times hosted | Years |
|---|---|---|
| New York City | 9 | 1934, 1939, 1942, 1949, 1960, 1964, 1977, 2008, 2013 |
| Chicago | 7 | 1933, 1947, 1950, 1962, 1983, 1990, 2003, 2027 |
| Cleveland | 6 | 1935, 1954, 1963, 1981, 1997, 2019 |
| Pittsburgh | 5 | 1944, 1959, 1974, 1994, 2006 |
| St. Louis | 5 | 1940, 1948, 1957, 1966, 2009 |
| Cincinnati | 5 | 1938, 1953, 1970, 1988, 2015 |
| Washington, D.C. | 5 | 1937, 1956, 1962, 1969, 2018 |
| Philadelphia | 5 | 1943, 1952, 1976, 1996, 2026 |
| Boston | 4 | 1936, 1946, 1961, 1999 |
| Detroit | 4 | 1941, 1951, 1971, 2005 |
| Kansas City | 3 | 1960, 1973, 2012 |
| Milwaukee | 3 | 1955, 1975, 2002 |
| San Diego | 3 | 1978, 1992, 2016 |
| San Francisco | 3 | 1961, 1984, 2007, 2028 |
| Houston | 3 | 1968, 1986, 2004 |
| Anaheim | 3 | 1967, 1989, 2010 |
| Minneapolis | 3 | 1965, 1985, 2014 |
| Los Angeles | 3 | 1959, 1980, 2022 |
| Seattle | 3 | 1979, 2001, 2023 |
| Atlanta | 3 | 1972, 2000, 2025 |
| Baltimore | 2 | 1958, 1993 |
| Denver | 2 | 1998, 2021 |
| Arlington | 2 | 1995, 2024 |
| Montreal | 1 | 1982 |
| Oakland | 1 | 1987 |
| Toronto | 1 | 1991 |
| Phoenix | 1 | 2011 |
| Miami | 1 | 2017 |
| St. Petersburg | 0 | -- |

=== Times hosted by club ===
| Club | Times hosted | Years |
|---|---|---|
| Cleveland Indians/Guardians | 6 | 1935, 1954, 1963, 1981, 1997, 2019 |
| New York/San Francisco Giants | 5 | 1934, 1942, 1961, 1984, 2007, 2028 |
| Washington Senators/Minnesota Twins | 5 | 1937, 1956, 1965, 1985, 2014 |
| Cincinnati Reds/Redlegs | 5 | 1938, 1953, 1970, 1988, 2015 |
| Pittsburgh Pirates | 5 | 1944, 1959, 1974, 1994, 2006 |
| Boston Bees/Milwaukee/Atlanta Braves | 5 | 1936, 1955, 1972, 2000, 2025 |
| Chicago White Sox | 4 | 1933, 1950, 1983, 2003 |
| New York Yankees | 4 | 1939, 1960, 1977, 2008 |
| St. Louis Cardinals | 4 | 1940, 1957, 1966, 2009 |
| Detroit Tigers | 4 | 1941, 1951, 1971, 2005 |
| Brooklyn/Los Angeles Dodgers | 4 | 1949, 1959, 1980, 2022 |
| Washington Senators/Texas Rangers | 4 | 1962, 1969, 1995, 2024 |
| Philadelphia Phillies | 4 | 1952, 1976, 1996, 2026 |
| Philadelphia/Kansas City/Oakland Athletics | 3 | 1943, 1960, 1987 |
| Boston Red Sox | 3 | 1946, 1961, 1999 |
| Chicago Cubs | 3 | 1947, 1962, 1990, 2027 |
| Milwaukee Brewers/St. Louis Browns/Baltimore Orioles | 3 | 1948, 1958, 1993 |
| California/Los Angeles Angels | 3 | 1967, 1989, 2010 |
| Houston Astros | 3 | 1968, 1986, 2004 |
| San Diego Padres | 3 | 1978, 1992, 2016 |
| Seattle Mariners | 3 | 1979, 2001, 2023 |
| New York Mets | 2 | 1964, 2013 |
| Kansas City Royals | 2 | 1973, 2012 |
| Seattle Pilots/Milwaukee Brewers | 2 | 1975, 2002 |
| Montreal Expos/Washington Nationals | 2 | 1982, 2018 |
| Colorado Rockies | 2 | 1998, 2021 |
| Toronto Blue Jays | 1 | 1991 |
| Arizona Diamondbacks | 1 | 2011 |
| Miami Marlins | 1 | 2017 |
| Tampa Bay Rays | 0 | -- |

- The Tampa Bay Rays have yet to host the All-Star Game.

=== Ballparks that have hosted more than one All-Star Game ===
==== Active baseball parks ====
- Wrigley Field (1947, 1962, 1990, 2027)
- Fenway Park (1946, 1961, 1999)
- Angel Stadium (1967, 1989, 2010)
- Kauffman Stadium (1973, 2012)
- Progressive Field (1997, 2019)
- Coors Field (1998, 2021)
- Dodger Stadium (1980, 2022)
- T-Mobile Park (2001, 2023)
- Oracle Park (2007, 2028)

==== Discontinued baseball parks ====
- Yankee Stadium (1939, 1960, 1977, 2008)
- Cleveland Stadium (1935, 1954, 1963, 1981)
- Sportsman's Park (1940, 1948, 1957)
- Tiger Stadium (1941, 1951, 1971)
- Comiskey Park (1933, 1950, 1983)
- Polo Grounds (1934, 1942)
- Shibe Park (1943, 1952)
- Crosley Field (1938, 1953)
- Griffith Stadium (1937, 1956)
- Forbes Field (1944, 1959)
- Robert F. Kennedy Memorial Stadium (1962, 1969)
- Milwaukee County Stadium (1955, 1975)
- Candlestick Park (1961, 1984)
- Houston Astrodome (1968, 1986)
- Riverfront Stadium (1970, 1988)
- Jack Murphy Stadium (1978, 1992)
- Three Rivers Stadium (1974, 1994)
- Veterans Stadium (1976, 1996)
- [Ebbets Field] (1949)

=== Ballparks that have never hosted an All-Star Game ===
==== Active baseball parks (oldest parks listed first) ====
- Tropicana Field, opened in 1990; the Rays have played there since 1998.
- Yankee Stadium, opened in 2009; the Yankees last hosted the ASG in 2008 at the original Yankee Stadium.

==== Discontinued baseball parks (oldest parks listed first) ====
- Baker Bowl, the Phillies played there from 1895 to 1938 (the All-Star game began in 1933)
- League Park, the Indians split games between League Park and Cleveland Stadium off and on until the end of the 1946 season
- Seals Stadium, the Giants played there from 1958 to 1959 *
- Wrigley Field of Los Angeles, the Angels played there in 1961 *
- Colt Stadium, the Colt .45s (now the Astros) played there from 1962 to 1964 *
- Sick's Stadium, the Pilots played there in 1969 *
- Jarry Park, the Expos played there from 1969 to 1976 *
- Arlington Stadium, the Rangers played there from 1972 to 1993
- Exhibition Stadium, the Blue Jays played there from 1977 to 1989
- Mile High Stadium, the Rockies played there from 1993 to 1994 *
- Hard Rock Stadium; the Marlins played there from 1993 to 2011, with the stadium known by seven different names during that period, the last of which was Sun Life Stadium

A * indicates that the stadium was a temporary facility, used in the short term by a team awaiting the construction of a larger, permanent home park.

=== The last time each franchise has hosted an All-Star Game ===
from least recent to most recent

- Athletics, 1987
- Chicago Cubs, 1990 (will host the 2027 All-Star Game)
- Toronto Blue Jays, 1991
- Baltimore Orioles, 1993
- Tampa Bay Rays, never (Franchise started in 1998)
- Boston Red Sox, 1999
- Milwaukee Brewers, 2002
- Chicago White Sox, 2003
- Houston Astros, 2004
- Detroit Tigers, 2005
- Pittsburgh Pirates, 2006
- San Francisco Giants, 2007 (will host the 2028 All-Star Game)
- New York Yankees, 2008
- St. Louis Cardinals, 2009
- Los Angeles Angels, 2010
- Arizona Diamondbacks, 2011
- Kansas City Royals, 2012
- New York Mets, 2013
- Minnesota Twins, 2014
- Cincinnati Reds, 2015
- San Diego Padres, 2016
- Miami Marlins, 2017
- Washington Nationals, 2018
- Cleveland Guardians, 2019
- Colorado Rockies, 2021
- Los Angeles Dodgers, 2022
- Seattle Mariners, 2023
- Texas Rangers, 2024
- Atlanta Braves, 2025
- Philadelphia Phillies, 2026

=== Hosting All-Star Game and post-season games in same season ===
The following teams have hosted the All-Star Game in the summer then proceeded to host post-season games in the fall:

- 1939: New York Yankees – won World Series
- 1946: Boston Red Sox – lost World Series
- 1949: Brooklyn Dodgers – lost World Series
- 1954: Cleveland Indians – lost World Series
- 1959: (Game 2): Los Angeles Dodgers – won World Series
- 1960: (Game 2): New York Yankees – lost World Series
- 1965: Minnesota Twins – lost World Series

League Championship Series play began in 1969

- 1970: Cincinnati Reds – lost World Series – also first season for Riverfront Stadium
- 1974: Pittsburgh Pirates – lost NLCS
- 1976: Philadelphia Phillies – lost NLCS
- 1977: New York Yankees – won World Series
- 1983: Chicago White Sox – lost ALCS
- 1986: Houston Astros – lost NLCS
- 1991: Toronto Blue Jays – lost ALCS

Division Series play began in 1995

- 1997: Cleveland Indians – lost World Series
- 1999: Boston Red Sox – lost ALCS
- 2000: Atlanta Braves – lost NLDS
- 2001: Seattle Mariners – lost ALCS
- 2004: Houston Astros – lost NLCS
- 2009: St. Louis Cardinals – lost NLDS
- 2011: Arizona Diamondbacks – lost NLDS

Wild Card Round play began in 2020 and became permanent in 2022

- 2022: Los Angeles Dodgers — lost NLDS
