= Sammy White (baseball) =

American baseball player (1927–1991)

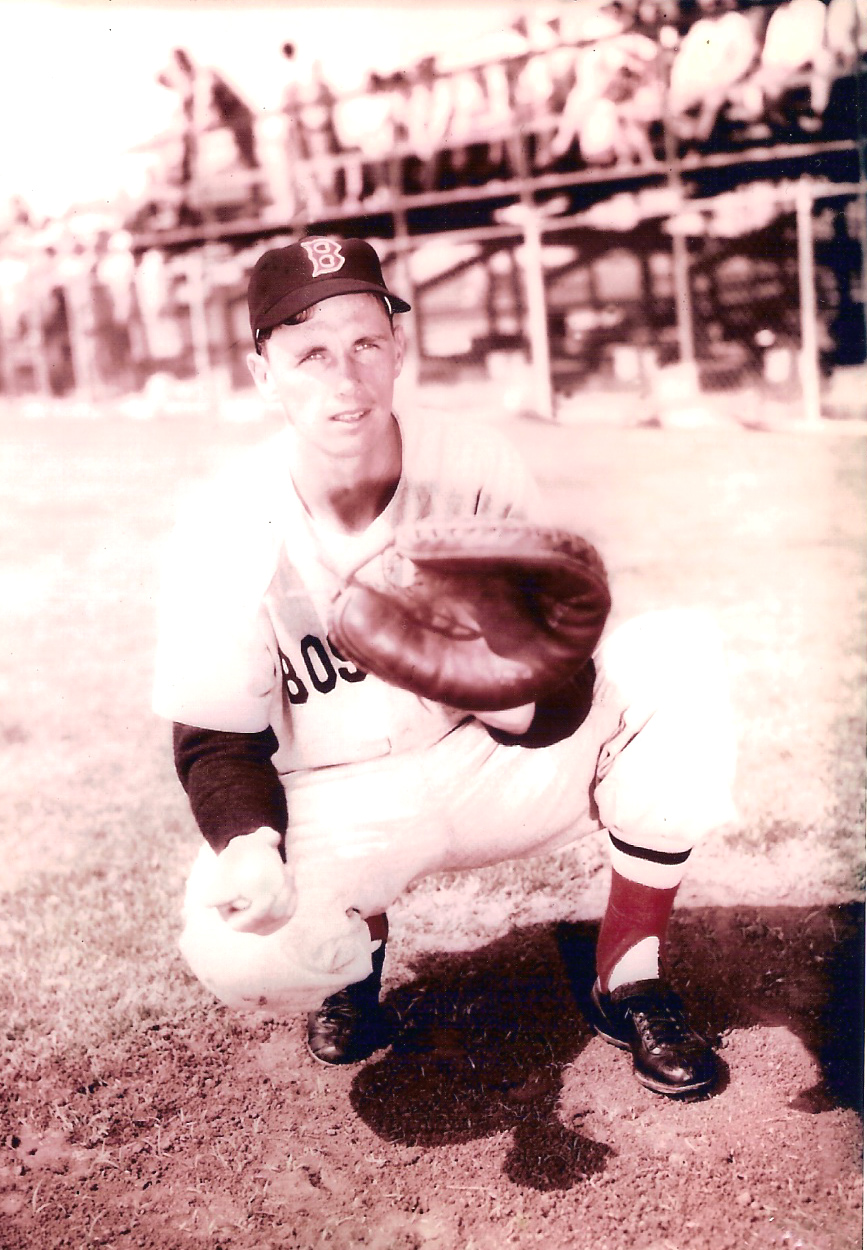
- White in 1952
- Catcher
- Born: July 7, 1927; Wenatchee, Washington, U.S.
- Died: August 4, 1991 (aged 64); Princeville, Hawaii, U.S.
- Batted: Right Threw: Right

MLB debut
- September 26, 1951, for the Boston Red Sox

Last MLB appearance
- August 23, 1962, for the Philadelphia Phillies

MLB statistics
- Batting average: .262
- Home runs: 66
- Runs batted in: 421
- Stats at Baseball Reference

Teams
- Boston Red Sox (1951–1959); Milwaukee Braves (1961); Philadelphia Phillies (1962)

Career highlights and awards
- All-Star (1953)

Sammy Charles White (July 7, 1927 – August 4, 1991) was an American Major League Baseball catcher and right-handed batter who played with the Boston Red Sox (1951–59), Milwaukee Braves (1961) and Philadelphia Phillies (1962). He was a solid defensive catcher, with a good arm and the ability to get the most out of a Boston pitching staff that included Mel Parnell, Ellis Kinder, Bill Monbouquette, Mike Fornieles and Frank Sullivan.

White was born in Wenatchee, Washington. A college baseball player and All-American college basketball player at the University of Washington, he signed his first professional baseball contract with the Seattle Rainiers of the Pacific Coast League in 1949. After the 1949 minor league season ended, the Minneapolis Lakers asked White to join their National Basketball Association team. But the Red Sox, who had acquired White's contract during 1949, prevented him from doing so.

On June 11, 1952, White hit a ninth-inning grand slam off of Satchel Paige, turning a 9–7 deficit into an 11–9 walk-off victory over the St. Louis Browns. After rounding third base, White dropped to the ground and crawled to home, kissing the plate. An All-Star in 1953, White enjoyed his best season with the bat in 1954, hitting .282 with 14 home runs and 75 runs batted in (RBIs). In a May 1, 1955, game against the Cleveland Indians, White ruined Bob Feller's no-hitter with a single in the 7th inning. Feller posted a 2–0 shutout, and set a major league record with his 12th one-hitter in that game. After nine productive years in Boston, White was traded to the Cleveland Indians just before the outset of the 1960 season. But White balked at the trade (even though Cleveland was a pennant contender and the Red Sox were an also-ran at the time) and retired, sitting out the season. Granted his release, he played for the Braves in 1961, and finished his career with Philadelphia one year later, playing for a former Red Sox teammate, skipper Gene Mauch. In eleven seasons, he was a career .262 hitter with 66 homers and 421 RBIs in 1043 games.

He became the only 20th-century player to score three runs in one inning against the Detroit Tigers, on June 18, 1953, when the Red Sox scored a modern major league record 17 runs in one inning.

On July 14, 1956, he caught Mel Parnell's no-hitter.

During his career with the Red Sox, White was one of the players featured in the Norman Rockwell painting The Rookie. He also opened a bowling alley, Sammy White's Brighton Bowl, a few miles from Fenway Park, and became a professional bowler. After baseball, White moved to Hanalei, Hawaii, where he became a professional golfer for the Princeville organization. He died in Princeville, Hawaii, at the age of 64.
