= Harvey Haddix =

American baseball player (1925–1994)

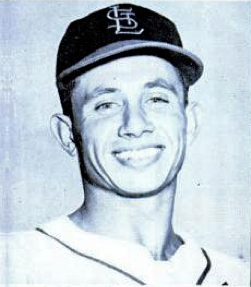
- Haddix in 1953
- Pitcher
- Born: September 18, 1925; Medway, Ohio, U.S.
- Died: January 8, 1994 (aged 68); Springfield, Ohio, U.S.
- Batted: Left Threw: Left

MLB debut
- August 20, 1952, for the St. Louis Cardinals

Last MLB appearance
- August 28, 1965, for the Baltimore Orioles

MLB statistics
- Win–loss record: 136–113
- Earned run average: 3.63
- Strikeouts: 1,575
- Stats at Baseball Reference

Teams
- St. Louis Cardinals (1952–1956); Philadelphia Phillies (1956–1957); Cincinnati Redlegs (1958); Pittsburgh Pirates (1959–1963); Baltimore Orioles (1964–1965)

Career highlights and awards
- 3× All-Star (1953–1955); 2× World Series champion (1960, 1979); 3× Gold Glove Award (1958–1960)

Harvey Haddix Jr. (September 18, 1925 – January 8, 1994) was an American professional baseball pitcher and pitching coach who played in Major League Baseball (MLB) for the St. Louis Cardinals (1952–1956), Philadelphia Phillies (1956–57), Cincinnati Redlegs (1958), Pittsburgh Pirates (1959–1963), and Baltimore Orioles (1964–65). The three-time All-Star and two-time World Series champion is most notable for pitching 12 perfect innings against the Milwaukee Braves on May 26, 1959, widely regarded to be the greatest game ever pitched in major league history. The Pirates left-hander retired a record consecutive 36 batters before he lost the game on an unearned run in the 13th inning. It marked the fourth nine-inning perfect game in Major League Baseball history at the time and first in 37 years.

In 1991, MLB changed the definition of a no-hitter to "a game in which a pitcher or pitchers complete a game of nine innings or more without allowing a hit." The revised requirement retroactively disqualified Haddix's gem even though he had pitched more consecutive perfect innings in one game than anyone in major league history. The pitcher was matter of fact in his response. "It's O.K.," he shrugged. "I know what I did."

Haddix produced what would be the best season of his career statistically with the St. Louis Cardinals in the 1953 season, his first full one in the big leagues, when he compiled a 20–9 record, 163 strikeouts, 3.06 earned run average (ERA), 19 complete games and six shutouts. On August 6, the rookie took a no-hitter into the ninth inning against the Phillies before he allowed pair of singles in a 2-0 victory. He finished second to Brooklyn Dodgers second baseman Jim Gilliam in the Rookie of the Year vote.

After five-plus seasons with the Cardinals, Haddix was dealt to the Phillies. He also pitched for the Reds and Pirates before he concluded his career with the Orioles as a reliever.

Haddix was credited with the dramatic Game 7 victory out of the bullpen in the 1960 World Series. After Haddix pitched a scoreless ninth inning, Bill Mazeroski hit a walk-off home run in the bottom half to give the Pirates their first league championship in 35 years. In 1979, as Pirates pitching coach, he was part of a second World Series championship team.

Haddix was commonly referred to as "The Kitten", a nickname that was afforded him while with Triple A Columbus early in his minor league career. General manager George Sisler Jr. likened the young pitcher to St. Louis Cardinals veteran pitcher Harry Brecheen, another undersized left-hander who was known as "Harry The Cat" in baseball circles. Sisler wondered what it would be like to have The Cat and The Kitten paired together in a doubleheader.

== Early life ==
Born on September 18, 1925 in Medway, Ohio, located just outside Springfield, Haddix was the third son of Nellie Mae Greider-Haddix and Harvey Haddix Sr.. His parents were farmers near Westville in west central Ohio, 20 miles from Medway.

== Near-perfect game ==
Haddix took a perfect game into the 13th inning against the Milwaukee Braves on May 26, 1959. The then 33-year-old retired 36 consecutive batters in 12 innings, essentially relying on two pitches: fastball and slider. However, Braves pitcher Lew Burdette was also pitching a shutout, which was seriously jeopardized on three occasions: in the third inning, when a Pirates base-running blunder negated three consecutive singles; the ninth, when the visitors advanced a runner to third base; and 10th, when Pirates pinch hitter Dick Stuart came within a few feet of a two-run homer.

What made Haddix's performance even more impressive was that it came against a star-studded Braves team on its home field. The line-up featured future Hall of Famers Hank Aaron and Eddie Mathews as well as All-Stars Del Crandall and Johnny Logan and sluggers Joe Adcock and Wes Covington. The Braves won the NL pennant in 1957 and 1958 and would be eliminated in a three-game playoff later in the 1959 season. Mazeroski said of Haddix's dominance, "Usually you have one or two great or spectacular defensive plays in these no-hitters. Not that night. It was the easiest game I ever played in."

Burdette was at the plate in the ninth inning when Pirates broadcaster Bob Prince reported the historic 27th consecutive out on KDKA Radio back to Western Pennsylvania. "Anything that (partner) Jim Woods and I have witnessed in this season absolutely at this moment pales into insignificance, and we have had some thumpers. Here's the wind-up and the 1-2 pitch to Burdette . . . Fouled off to the right out of play. And Burdette has shortened the grip on that bat and is trying to really hang in there. And don't forget, he's also quite a threat at the long ball. Two men down, last half of the ninth inning, no score. I can't repeat it enough . . . The 1-2 pitch . . . Struck him out swinging! Haddix pitches a perfect nine-inning, no-hit, no-run game . . . A standing ovation! . . . Ladies and gentlemen, Harvey Haddix has just become the (eighth) pitcher in the history in all baseball to pitch a perfect no-hit, no-run, nine-inning ballgame."

A fielding error by third baseman Don Hoak ended the perfect game in the bottom of the 13th. It allowed leadoff batter Félix Mantilla to reach first base. He advanced to second base on a sacrifice bunt by Mathews, which was followed by an intentional walk to Aaron. Adcock followed with an apparent home run to end the no-hitter and game.

As Prince called it: "Counting the final two outs he had against Cardinals in his last victory at Forbes Field, (Haddix) retired 38 men in order before a man got aboard, and then only on an error. One out, batter Adcock, takes high, ball one . . . One ball, no strikes . . . There isn't anybody sicker (about the error) at this moment than Don Hoak, I guarantee you that. He's crushed over this. Here's the pitch. There's a fly ball, deep right-center . . . That ball might be on through and over everything . . . It's gone -- home run . . . Absolutely fantastic."

However, in the confusion of the moment, Aaron left the basepaths prematurely and was passed by Adcock for the second out. The hit was changed from a home run to a double as National League (NL) president Warren Giles would rule later. Because only Mantilla's run counted, the final score was 1–0, but Haddix and the Pirates lost a heart-breaker just the same.

I could have put a cup on either corner of the plate and hit it.

— Harvey Haddix

After the game, Haddix received numerous letters of congratulations and support as well as one from a Texas A&M fraternity. It read in its entirety on university stationery, "Dear Harvey, Tough shit." "It made me mad until I realized they were right," Haddix recounted. "That's exactly what it was."

In May, 1989, Bob Buhl disclosed that Braves pitchers had been stealing signs from Pirates catcher Smokey Burgess, whose high crouch made his hand signals easier to detect from a distance. From their bullpen in right field, Braves pitchers repositioned a towel to signal for a fastball or a breaking ball, the pitches that Haddix relied on heavily in the game. Despite this assistance, the Milwaukee offense didn't mount a threat until the final inning. Aaron was the only Braves hitter who ignored the signals.

== Career overview ==
Over his 14-year career, Haddix had a 136–113 record with 1,575 strikeouts, a 3.63 ERA, 99 complete games, 21 shutouts, 21 saves, and 2,235 innings pitched in 453 games (285 as a starter). He was in the spotlight in the 1960 World Series against the Yankees. After winning Game 5 as a starter, Haddix relieved late in Game 7 and was credited with the win when Bill Mazeroski hit his famous Series-ending walk-off home run. Haddix went 2–0 in the 1960 Series, with a 2.45 ERA.

In 1964, Haddix served solely as a relief pitcher for the Orioles, pitching 89 2/3 innings, with five wins, ten saves, and a 2.31 ERA. He was the runner-up for the Gold Glove Award.

As a hitter, Haddix was among the best of his era, posting a .212 batting average (169-for-798) with 95 runs, 37 doubles, nine triples, 4 home runs, 64 RBI, four stolen bases and 46 bases on balls. Defensively, he recorded a .957 fielding percentage, which was the league average at his position.

Jim Palmer said he learned a lot about pitching from Haddix during the veteran's time with the Orioles.

Haddix later followed his former teammate Harry Brecheen into the ranks of major league pitching coaches, working with the New York Mets, Cincinnati Reds, Boston Red Sox, Cleveland Indians, and Pirates for 14 years spanning 1966 to 1984.

== Death ==
A heavy smoker in his playing days, Haddix died from emphysema in 1994 in Springfield, Ohio, at age 68.

== Career highlights ==
- 3-time All-Star (1953–1955)
- 3-time Gold Glove Award (1958–1960)
- Co-Player of the Month for May 1959
- Major League record, Most consecutive batters retired in one game (36) achieved on May 26, 1959

== Legacy ==
Haddix Field, the Little League baseball park in New Carlisle, Ohio, is named for Haddix.

Haddix's near-perfect game is memorialized by The Baseball Project, whose song, "Harvey Haddix", appears on their debut album, Volume 1: Frozen Ropes and Dying Quails (2008).

Awards
Preceded by Willie Mays	Major League Player of the Month; May, 1959 (with Hank Aaron)	Succeeded by Roy Face
Sporting positions
Preceded by Wes Westrum	New York Mets pitching coach 1966–1967	Succeeded by Rube Walker
Preceded by Mel Harder	Cincinnati Reds pitching coach 1969	Succeeded by Larry Shepard
Preceded by Charlie Wagner	Boston Red Sox pitching coach 1971	Succeeded by Lee Stange
Preceded by Clay Bryant	Cleveland Indians pitching coach 1975–1978	Succeeded by Chuck Hartenstein
Preceded by Larry Sherry	Pittsburgh Pirates pitching coach 1979–1984	Succeeded by Grant Jackson
