= 2006 Major League Baseball All-Star Game =

2006 American baseball competition

	1	2	3	4	5	6	7	8	9	R	H	E
American League	0	1	0	0	0	0	0	0	2	3	7	1
National League	0	1	1	0	0	0	0	0	0	2	6	0
- Date: July 11, 2006
- Venue: PNC Park
- City: Pittsburgh, Pennsylvania
- Managers: Ozzie Guillén (CHW); Phil Garner (HOU)
- MVP: Michael Young (TEX)
- Attendance: 38,904
- Ceremonial first pitch: Chuck Tanner
- Television: Fox (United States); MLB International (International)
- TV announcers: Joe Buck and Tim McCarver (Fox); Dave O'Brien and Rick Sutcliffe (MLB International)
- Radio: ESPN
- Radio announcers: Dan Shulman and Dave Campbell

The 2006 Major League Baseball All-Star Game was the 77th playing of the midseason exhibition baseball game between the all-stars of the American League (AL) and National League (NL), the two leagues comprising Major League Baseball. The game was held on July 11, 2006 at PNC Park in Pittsburgh, Pennsylvania, the home of the Pittsburgh Pirates of the National League. The contest was the fifth hosted by the city of Pittsburgh – tying the Cleveland Guardians for the record of most times hosted by a single franchise. The game resulted in the American League defeating the National League 3–2, thus awarding the AL champion (which was eventually the Detroit Tigers) home-field advantage in the 2006 World Series.

== Background ==
As with each All-Star Game since 1970, the 8 starting position players (with no designated hitter due to playing in an NL stadium) of each league were elected by fan balloting. The remaining players were selected by a players' vote, each league's team manager, and the All-Star Final Vote to add one more player to each roster. In all, 32 players were selected to each league's team, not including players who decline to play due to injuries or personal reasons.

The game was the fourth straight All-Star Game to decide home-field advantage in the World Series. The AL entered the game on a nine-game unbeaten streak (eight wins, with one tie in 2002). Many analysts saw the disparity between the leagues as more pronounced than ever this season, as evidenced by the AL's dominance in interleague play, where its 154–98 record was the best for either league in the ten-year history of the format. This was primarily the result of a similar difference in team payrolls, many observers agreed. The AL boasted the four largest in the majors, while the NL had three of the four lowest among the 30 teams. At $194.7 million, the New York Yankees payroll was more than those of the Florida Marlins, Colorado Rockies, Pittsburgh Pirates and Milwaukee Brewers combined.

== Rosters ==
Players in italics have since been inducted into the National Baseball Hall of Fame.

=== American League ===
Elected starters
Position	Player	Team	All-Star Games
C	Iván Rodríguez	Tigers	13
1B	David Ortiz	Red Sox	3
2B	Mark Loretta	Red Sox	2
3B	Alex Rodriguez	Yankees	10
SS	Derek Jeter	Yankees	7
OF	Vladimir Guerrero	Angels	7
OF	Manny Ramírez	Red Sox	10
OF	Ichiro Suzuki	Mariners	6

Pitchers
Position	Player	Team	All-Star Games
P	Mark Buehrle	White Sox	3
P	José Contreras	White Sox	1
P	Roy Halladay	Blue Jays	4
P	Bobby Jenks	White Sox	1
P	Scott Kazmir	Devil Rays	1
P	Francisco Liriano	Twins	1
P	Jonathan Papelbon	Red Sox	1
P	Mark Redman	Royals	1
P	Mariano Rivera	Yankees	8
P	Kenny Rogers	Tigers	4
P	B.J. Ryan	Blue Jays	2
P	Johan Santana	Twins	2
P	Barry Zito	Athletics	3

Reserves
Position	Player	Team	All-Star Games
C	Joe Mauer	Twins	1
C	A. J. Pierzynski	White Sox	2
1B	Paul Konerko	White Sox	3
1B	Jim Thome	White Sox	5
2B	Robinson Canó	Yankees	1
2B	José López	Mariners	1
3B	Troy Glaus	Blue Jays	4
SS	Miguel Tejada	Orioles	4
SS	Michael Young	Rangers	3
OF	Jermaine Dye	White Sox	2
OF	Gary Matthews, Jr.	Rangers	1
OF	Magglio Ordóñez	Tigers	5
OF	Alex Ríos	Blue Jays	1
OF	Grady Sizemore	Indians	1
OF	Vernon Wells	Blue Jays	2

=== National League ===
Elected starters
Position	Player	Team	All-Star Games
C	Paul Lo Duca	Mets	4
1B	Albert Pujols	Cardinals	5
2B	Chase Utley	Phillies	1
3B	David Wright	Mets	1
SS	José Reyes	Mets	1
OF	Jason Bay	Pirates	2
OF	Carlos Beltrán	Mets	3
OF	Alfonso Soriano	Nationals	5

Pitchers
Position	Player	Team	All-Star Games
P	Bronson Arroyo	Reds	1
P	Chris Capuano	Brewers	1
P	Chris Carpenter	Cardinals	2
P	Brian Fuentes	Rockies	2
P	Tom Glavine	Mets	10
P	Tom Gordon	Phillies	3
P	Trevor Hoffman	Padres	5
P	Pedro Martínez	Mets	8
P	Roy Oswalt	Astros	2
P	Brad Penny	Dodgers	1
P	Jason Schmidt	Giants	3
P	Derrick Turnbow	Brewers	1
P	Brandon Webb	Diamondbacks	1
P	Carlos Zambrano	Cubs	2

Reserves
Position	Player	Team	All-Star Games
C	Brian McCann	Braves	1
1B	Lance Berkman	Astros	4
1B	Nomar Garciaparra	Dodgers	6
1B	Ryan Howard	Phillies	1
2B	Dan Uggla	Marlins	1
3B	Miguel Cabrera	Marlins	3
3B	Scott Rolen	Cardinals	5
3B	Freddy Sanchez	Pirates	1
SS	David Eckstein	Cardinals	2
SS	Édgar Rentería	Braves	5
OF	Andruw Jones	Braves	5
OF	Matt Holliday	Rockies	1
OF	Carlos Lee	Brewers	2

== Game ==
=== Coaching staffs ===
American League
Coach	Position	Team
Ozzie Guillén	Manager	Chicago White Sox
John Gibbons	Toronto Blue Jays manager	
Eric Wedge	Cleveland Indians manager	
Tim Raines	Bench coach	Chicago White Sox
Don Cooper	Pitching coach	Chicago White Sox
Greg Walker	Hitting coach	Chicago White Sox
Art Kusnyer	Bullpen coach	Chicago White Sox
Harold Baines	First base coach	Chicago White Sox
Joey Cora	Third base coach	Chicago White Sox

National League
Coach	Position	Team
Phil Garner	Manager	Houston Astros
Jerry Narron	Cincinnati Reds manager	
Jim Tracy	Pittsburgh Pirates manager	
Cecil Cooper	Bench coach	Houston Astros
Jim Hickey	Pitching coach	Houston Astros
Gary Gaetti	Hitting coach	Houston Astros
Mark Bailey	Bullpen coach	Houston Astros
José Cruz	First base coach	Houston Astros
Doug Mansolino	Third base coach	Houston Astros

=== Umpires ===
Position	Umpire
Home Plate	Jerry Crawford
First Base	Randy Marsh
Second Base	Fieldin Culbreth
Third Base	Jeff Nelson
Left Field	Mike Everitt
Right Field	Alfonso Márquez

=== Starting lineups ===
American League				National League			
Order	Player	Team	Position	Order	Player	Team	Position
1	Ichiro Suzuki	Mariners	RF	1	Alfonso Soriano	Nationals	LF
2	Derek Jeter	Yankees	SS	2	Carlos Beltrán	Mets	CF
3	David Ortiz	Red Sox	1B	3	Albert Pujols	Cardinals	1B
4	Alex Rodriguez	Yankees	3B	4	Jason Bay	Pirates	RF
5	Vladimir Guerrero	Angels	LF	5	Édgar Rentería	Braves	SS
6	Iván Rodríguez	Tigers	C	6	David Wright	Mets	3B
7	Vernon Wells	Blue Jays	CF	7	Chase Utley	Phillies	2B
8	Mark Loretta	Red Sox	2B	8	Paul Lo Duca	Mets	C
9	Kenny Rogers	Tigers	P	9	Brad Penny	Dodgers	P

=== Game summary ===
Tuesday, July 11, 2006 8:44 pm (EDT) at PNC Park in Pittsburgh, Pennsylvania
Team	1	2	3	4	5	6	7	8	9	R	H	E
American League	0	1	0	0	0	0	0	0	2	3	7	1
National League	0	1	1	0	0	0	0	0	0	2	6	0
WP: B.J. Ryan (1–0) LP: Trevor Hoffman (0–1) Sv: Mariano Rivera (1); Home runs: AL: Vladimir Guerrero (1); NL: David Wright (1)

National League starting pitcher Brad Penny set the tone for the evening, striking out Ichiro Suzuki, Derek Jeter, and David Ortiz to start the game. His fastball had uncharacteristic speed, never going below 96 miles per hour, and – aside from a lone curveball – was the only pitch he threw in the first inning. American League pitcher Kenny Rogers wasn't as overpowering as Penny, but still escaped the first relatively unscathed. The AL would get to Penny in the second as Vladimir Guerrero hit an opposite-field home run that just cleared the right field fence, giving the AL a 1–0 lead. The NL would respond in the bottom of the inning with David Wright hitting his own home run to left field, tying the game at 1–1.

Roy Halladay relieved Rogers in the bottom of the third. It was in this inning when the National League exemplified what it does best: playing small. Alfonso Soriano hit a single with one out and stole second base on Gold Glove catcher Iván Rodríguez. He tried to score on a single by Carlos Beltrán, but was thrown out at home plate by Vernon Wells. Beltran would advance to second on the throw, then steal third and score on a wild pitch by Halladay, giving the NL a 2–1 lead.

That lead would seem like enough for the NL for most of the evening. After Roy Oswalt relieved Penny in the third, Brandon Webb, Bronson Arroyo, Brian Fuentes, Derrick Turnbow, and Tom Gordon would each throw an inning of scoreless relief, limiting the AL to just three hits in that span. After Halladay pitched the fourth, Barry Zito, Scott Kazmir, Johan Santana, and B.J. Ryan would also each pitch an inning without giving up a run, with the only baserunner allowed on a walk by Santana, the only walk of the game.

Trevor Hoffman came on to try to earn the save in the ninth. After inducing two groundouts back to himself, it seemed like Hoffman, who, at the time, was second all-time in career saves, would finally send the American League to a loss in an All-Star Game for the first time in a decade. However, Paul Konerko hit a single to left past third baseman Miguel Cabrera, and was pinch-run for by José Lopez. Troy Glaus hit a ground rule double down the left field line, forcing Lopez to hold at third. While it looked like the National League received a break (as Lopez could have possibly scored the tying run if the ball stayed in play), Hoffman allowed a two-strike triple to Michael Young, who went on to win the MVP, scoring Lopez and Glaus and putting the AL up 3–2.

Mariano Rivera would now try to save the game for the American League. Because Lopez pinch-ran for Konerko in the top of the ninth, the American League was left without any first basemen on the roster. Glaus, in the game as a third baseman, moved to first for the bottom of the inning, a position he never played before in his career, while Lopez played third. Despite an error made by Lopez, Rivera pitched a quiet ninth to earn the save and extend the American League's unbeaten streak to ten games.

== Home Run Derby ==
The Century 21 Real Estate Home Run Derby was held on the Monday before the game, July 10. Four players from each league competed to hit as many home runs in each round to advance and eventually win the contest. This year's Derby featured an important rule change: home runs in the first round would carry over into the second round. In previous years, some players would hit a tremendous amount of home runs in the first round, but become tired by the second round and hit relatively fewer home runs for that round, often not enough to qualify for the finals. By allowing the home runs to carry over, a player can't necessarily be "punished" for hitting an impressive total in the first round. However, like in previous Derbies, the two finalists start over at zero for the finals.

In the finals, Ryan Howard of the Philadelphia Phillies defeated David Wright of the New York Mets 5–4, and hit a total of 23 home runs on the night, leading all competitors. Howard memorably hit his winning home run into a sign guaranteeing one person in the crowd 500 free round-trip flights from Southwest Airlines.

PNC Park is distinct for having the Allegheny River running behind the right field bleachers. As a result, several balls were hit into the river on the fly (a feat that had only been accomplished once before in the stadium's regular-season history), as well as many more bouncing off the walkway alongside the river. Many fans waited in the river in canoes hoping to retrieve a ball, a sight more reminiscent of the following year's All-Star Game and Home Run Derby site, AT&T Park.

For the second straight year, gold balls were utilized whenever a player had one out remaining in the round. Any home runs hit with the gold ball meant Major League Baseball and Century 21 would pledge to donate $21,000 (US) to the Boys & Girls Clubs of America and Easter Seals, respectively. In all, 14 gold-ball home runs were hit, constituting $294,000 raised for both charities.

PNC Park, Pittsburgh—N.L. 62, A.L. 24
Player	Team	Round 1	Round 2	Subtotal	Finals	Total
Ryan Howard	Philadelphia	8	10	18	5	23
David Wright	New York (NL)	16	2	18	4	22
Miguel Cabrera	Florida	9	6	15	–	15
David Ortiz	Boston	10	3	13	–	13
Jermaine Dye	Chicago (AL)	7	–	–	–	7
Lance Berkman	Houston	3	–	–	–	3
Miguel Tejada	Baltimore	3	–	–	–	3
Troy Glaus	Toronto	1	–	–	–	1

== Other events ==
=== Futures Game ===
The eighth annual XM Satellite Radio Futures Game was held on Sunday, July 9, showcasing the top minor league prospects from all thirty major league clubs. Game MVP Billy Butler of the Kansas City Royals farm system hit a two-run home run to help lead the United States team to an 8–5 victory over the World team.

Team	1	2	3	4	5	6	7	R	H	E
World	0	1	0	3	1	0	0	5	9	1
United States	0	2	5	1	0	0	X	8	11	0
WP: Homer Bailey (1–0) LP: José Garcia (0–1) Sv: Matt Lindstrom (1); Home runs: Wor: George Kottaras (1); USA: Billy Butler (1), Joe Koshansky (1)

=== Roberto Clemente ceremony ===
Commissioner Bud Selig presented the Commissioner's Historic Achievement Award to deceased Pittsburgh Pirates legend Roberto Clemente between the fourth and fifth innings of the All-Star Game. Clemente's widow, Vera, accepted the award. FOX play-by-play announcer Joe Buck emceed the ceremony. As a result, he called the bottom of the fourth inning from the entrance behind home plate. Buck created a little controversy when after Vera Clemente spoke what many said was a beautiful, moving speech Buck asked the fans "You guys having fun out here?!"

== Notes ==
- Penny became only the second pitcher in All-Star Game history to strike out the side in the first inning. Pedro Martínez accomplished the feat in 1999, striking out Barry Larkin, Larry Walker, and Sammy Sosa.
- At one point 7 of the 8 position players fans could vote on in the AL were either New York Yankees or Boston Red Sox.
- The 2006 Home Run Derby was the last year that Century 21 sponsored it, as the 2007 Home Run Derby was sponsored by State Farm.
- The Pirates became the first team to host the All-Star Game in three different stadiums. The others before PNC Park were Forbes Field and Three Rivers Stadium, both of which hosted the game twice.
