= Billy Goodman =

American baseball player (1926–1984)

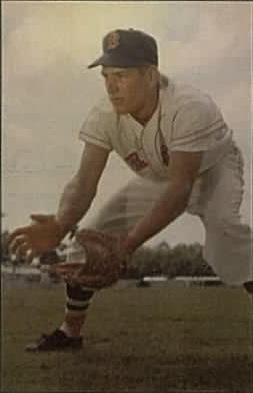
- Goodman, circa 1953
- Infielder
- Born: March 22, 1926; Concord, North Carolina, U.S.
- Died: October 1, 1984 (aged 58); Sarasota, Florida, U.S.
- Batted: Left Threw: Right

MLB debut
- April 19, 1947, for the Boston Red Sox

Last MLB appearance
- September 29, 1962, for the Houston Colt .45s

MLB statistics
- Batting average: .300
- Home runs: 19
- Runs batted in: 591
- Stats at Baseball Reference

Teams
- Boston Red Sox (1947–1957); Baltimore Orioles (1957); Chicago White Sox (1958–1961); Houston Colt .45's (1962)

Career highlights and awards
- 2× All-Star (1949, 1953); AL batting champion (1950); Boston Red Sox Hall of Fame

William Dale Goodman (March 22, 1926 – October 1, 1984) was an American Major League Baseball (MLB) infielder who played 16 seasons for the Boston Red Sox, Baltimore Orioles, Chicago White Sox, and Houston Colt .45s, from 1947 through 1962. Goodman was inducted posthumously into the Boston Red Sox Hall of Fame in November 2004.

Goodman was an outstanding hitter and fielder, and one of the most versatile players of his era. He played every position in the major leagues except catcher and pitcher and was an All-Star for two seasons. In 1950, he won the American League (AL) batting title hitting .354 with 68 runs batted in (RBI) and was the AL Most Valuable Player runner-up to New York Yankees shortstop Phil Rizzuto (hit .324 with 66 RBI). Goodman batted over .290 in eleven seasons including over .300 in five seasons. In 1959, he hit .250 with an on-base percentage of .304, helping the White Sox win the American League pennant. His career .376 on-base percentage made him an ideal lead-off hitter. He was inducted into the North Carolina Sports Hall of Fame in 1969.

== Early years ==
Goodman was born in Concord, North Carolina, and played Textile League baseball in Concord before signing with the Atlanta Crackers of the Southern Association in 1944 at just eighteen years old.

=== Minor league ===
Goodman hit .336 his first season in Atlanta. He left baseball temporarily, serving in the United States Navy during World War II in 1945. While assigned to the Pacific Theater on Ulithi with Major Leaguer Mickey Vernon and future Baseball Hall of Famer, Larry Doby, both Goodman and Vernon encouraged Doby to become a Major League baseball player.

Goodman returned to the Atlanta Crackers in 1946 to bat .389 and lead his team to the Southern Association's playoff series championship. On February 8, 1947, he was sold to the Boston Red Sox. Goodman entered his first Spring training battling Sam Mele for the open right field job. With Mele winning the job, Goodman batted .182 in limited play through May of the 1947 season before being reassigned to the American Association's Louisville Colonels, where he batted .340 over the remainder of the season.

== MLB career ==
=== Boston Red Sox ===
==== 1947–1948 ====
Goodman spent the spring with the Red Sox in 1947 playing in 12 games, 2 in the outfield, and 10 filling in at second base for an injured Bobby Doerr, He made his first start as a Major League third baseman on May 20, 1948. From there, Goodman moved across the diamond to first base for the remainder of the season in the Majors. He batted .310 with 66 runs batted in as a rookie. His first Major League home run, and only home run of the season, was a grand slam off the Detroit Tigers' Virgil Trucks.

==== 1949–1950 ====
He was named to the first of two American League All-Star rosters in 1949, and appeared during the bottom of the 8th inning of the All-Star Game as a defensive replacement for Washington Senators first baseman Eddie Robinson. Early in the 1950 season, Goodman suffered a chip fracture in his left ankle that cost him a month of play. Power hitting rookie first baseman Walt Dropo earned himself a place in the everyday starting line-up in Goodman's absence, batting .348 with ten home runs and 33 RBIs. Goodman found himself without a starting position upon his return. However, injuries to Bobby Doerr and third baseman Johnny Pesky kept Goodman in the line-up semi-regularly. After Ted Williams injured himself in the All-Star game, Goodman took over in left field for the Bosox, and batted .338 with 23 RBIs filling in for the Boston legend. Playing five different positions over the course of the season, Goodman logged enough at-bats to win the American League batting title with a .354 batting average (Stan Musial, National League, .346) with 68 RBI, and was the runner-up in AL Most Valuable Player Award balloting to New York Yankees shortstop Phil Rizzuto, who hit .324 with 66 RBI; Yankee catcher Yogi Berra finished 3rd in the voting, hitting .322 with 124 RBI.

==== 1951–1953 ====
Goodman resumed his utility player role in 1951. He began the season playing first base when Dropo fractured his right wrist. He shifted over to right field upon Dropo's return, but was back at first when Dropo was optioned to the Pacific Coast League's San Diego Padres at the end of June for "more work." He spent most of the month of August at second base when Bobby Doerr's bad back kept him out of the lineup. In all, Goodman played five different positions, and batted .297 with 50 RBIs and 92 runs scored. His 638 plate appearances were third highest on the team behind Dom DiMaggio and Ted Williams.

Doerr retired at the end of the season, opening a regular position for Goodman at second base in 1952. He batted over .300 each of the next three seasons, and was moved into the lead-off spot in manager Lou Boudreau's batting order in 1953, where he would remain for the rest of his Red Sox career. He was elected to start the All-Star Game as a second baseman that season despite being sidelined for a month by one of the more bizarre baseball injuries. While arguing with first base umpire Jim Duffy, Goodman was restrained by teammate Jim Piersall. Piersall pulled Goodman toward the dugout, and in doing so, strained Goodman's rib cartilage.

==== 1954–1957 ====
In 1954, Goodman returned to his "jack of all trades" role with the Bosox. After starting the season at second, he moved over to third when the Sox traded George Kell to the Chicago White Sox. He moved to left field when Ted Williams was sidelined by a virus infection in his right lung. Upon Williams' return, Goodman began platooning at first with Harry Agganis (despite the fact that both were left-handed batters) until he was shifted back to second base in the beginning of August.

He had a starting job at second base again in 1955, and led the team with 100 runs scored while logging a team-high 719 plate appearances. Both were career highs, as were his 176 hits and 99 walks. He began losing playing time to Ted Lepcio at second base toward the end of the 1956 season. He was relegated to pinch hitting duties early in 1957, before a mid-season trade sent him to the Baltimore Orioles for pitcher Mike Fornieles.

==== The Rookie ====
During his time with the Red Sox, Goodman was one of the players featured in the 1957 Norman Rockwell painting The Rookie.

=== Baltimore Orioles ===
Goodman was immediately inserted into the starting line-up in Baltimore, and hit a home run in his first game as an Oriole. He mostly played third base, filling in for an injured George Kell, but also played first, second, short, left field and right field. He batted .308 with three home runs and 33 RBIs in 73 games for the Orioles. At the end of the season, he, Tito Francona and Ray Moore were dealt to the Chicago White Sox for Larry Doby, Jack Harshman and Jim Marshall. Chicago later sent pitcher Russ Heman to Baltimore as part of this deal when the Orioles discovered that Harshman was suffering from a slipped disc.

=== Chicago White Sox ===
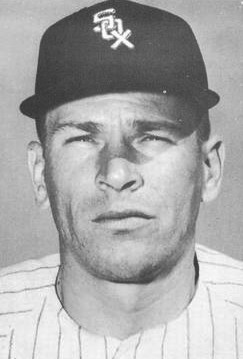
Goodman in 1958

In 1958, with Nellie Fox at second base, Goodman shifted to third with the White Sox. He was sidelined by a knee injury for most of the month of May. Upon his return, he quickly shot up among the American League leaders in batting, with his average peaking at .336 in late July.

At 33 years old at the start of the 1959 season, Goodman was used in a lefty-righty platoon with Bubba Phillips at third base. The 1959 White Sox reached the World Series for the first time since the infamous 1919 World Series. It was also the first and only World Series of Goodman's career. Goodman appeared in five of the six games of the 1959 World Series, driving in and scoring one run in the White Sox's 11–0 game 1 victory. He also went two-for-three in game 3, and was hit by a pitch in the eighth inning to load the bases with the White Sox down by two runs (they ended up scoring one). Overall, he batted .231 (3-for-13) in Chicago's six-game loss to the Los Angeles Dodgers.

Goodman was used sparingly by manager Al López in 1960. After the season, the White Sox made him available for the 1960 Major League Baseball expansion draft, but he went unselected. Instead, he remained with the franchise for two more seasons, in which he batted a combined .242 with one home run and sixteen RBIs in 71 games. After holding out over a salary dispute at the start of Spring training 1962, he was released by the White Sox just as the season was set to start.

=== Houston Colt .45s ===
Goodman joined the Houston Colt .45s in 1962, playing in 49 games during their inaugural season, and went two-for-five with two runs scored in his first game with the team. Overall, he batted .255 in 82 games for the Colt .45s, while playing first, second, and third base.

=== Player-manager ===
In 1963, he became a player-manager for the Colts' Carolina League affiliate, the Durham Bulls, and batted .354 with six home runs, the most home runs he hit in a season at any level. The following season, he appeared on the mound for two games (7 innings) with Durham, leaving catcher as the only position he never played professionally. He managed the Cocoa Astros of the Florida State League in 1965. In three seasons, he had a combined 184–228 record for a .447 winning percentage.

=== Scout and instructor ===
He became a scout for the Red Sox in 1966, then an instructor in the Kansas City Athletics organization in 1967 before moving over to the Atlanta Braves' organization in 1968, serving as first-base coach for the Braves Major League squad through 1970.

== Later years ==
Goodman retired from the game in 1976, and became an antiques dealer in Sarasota, Florida, the spring training home of the Red Sox during his decade with them, and of the White Sox from 1960 through 1997. He died on October 1, 1984, after a year-long battle with cancer.

== Major League stats ==
Years	Games	PA	AB	Runs	Hits	2B	3B	HR	RBI	SB	BB	SO	OBP	SGA	BA	Fld%
16	1623	6443	5644	807	1691	299	44	19	591	37	669	329	.376	.378	.300	.978

Goodman had five 5-hit games in his career. His best playing position according to fielding percentage was .991 at first base; in 1949, he led the AL with a .992 fielding average at first base.

== See also ==
- List of Major League Baseball batting champions
