= Davey Williams =

American baseball player (1927-2009)

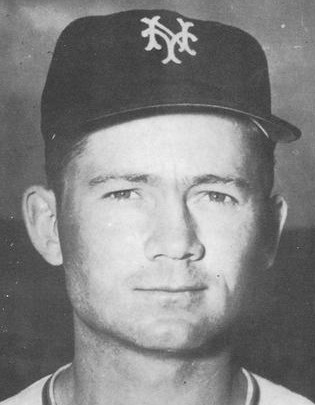
- Second baseman
- Born: November 2, 1927; Dallas, Texas, U.S.
- Died: August 17, 2009 (aged 81); Dallas, Texas, U.S.
- Batted: Right Threw: Right

MLB debut
- September 16, 1949, for the New York Giants

Last MLB appearance
- July 30, 1955, for the New York Giants

MLB statistics
- Batting average: .252
- Home runs: 32
- Runs batted in: 163
- Stats at Baseball Reference

Teams
- New York Giants (1949, 1951–1955)

Career highlights and awards
- All-Star (1953); World Series champion (1954)

David Carlous Williams (November 2, 1927 – August 17, 2009) was an American professional baseball player and coach. During his Major League Baseball career, spent entirely with the New York Giants of the National League, the second baseman appeared in 517 games over six seasons (1949; 1951−1955), and was selected to the 1953 NL All-Star team. Williams was listed as 5 feet 10 inches (1.78 m) tall and 165 pounds (75 kg), and batted and threw right-handed. He was born in Dallas, Texas, where he graduated from Sunset High School in 1945. He is a Member of the Sunset High School Hall of Fame.

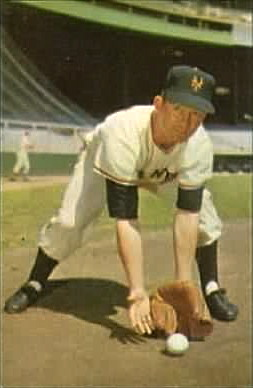
Williams in 1953

== Playing career ==
Williams' most productive major league season came in 1952, when he posted career-highs in home runs (13), runs (70), RBI (48) and extra-base hits (42), with a .254 batting average in 138 games. In 1953, he hit a career-best .297, which him earned a selection to the NL All-Star squad. In the 1953 Midsummer Classic, played July 14 at Crosley Field, Cincinnati, Williams took over from Red Schoendienst as the National League's second sacker in the seventh inning with the Nationals leading 2–0. He draw a base on balls off Mike Garcia in his only plate appearance and played errorless ball in the field as the Senior Circuit won, 5–1. Then, in 1954, Williams played in a career-high 142 games, starting all but one of them as the Giants' second baseman. His batting average fell to .222, but the Giants captured the National League pennant. In the 1954 World Series that followed, Williams started all four games of the Fall Classic. He went hitless in 11 at bats with a run batted in and handled 20 chances with one error, as the Giants swept away the Cleveland Indians to become world champions.

However, 1954 was his last full season as a player. On April 23, 1955, Williams severely injured his back in an on-field collision with Jackie Robinson of the Brooklyn Dodgers — the result of a brushback battle between the two bitter rivals. The Giants' pitcher, Sal "The Barber" Maglie, was notorious for knocking batters down at the plate. Maglie had angered the Dodgers by throwing several pitches high and inside on Brooklyn hitters, including a pitch that sailed behind Robinson's head. In the fourth inning, Robinson dropped down a bunt, intending to retaliate for the knockdown pitch by crashing into Maglie as he fielded the ball. But Maglie did not come off the pitching mound and Robinson instead collided with Williams, who was covering first base. Robinson later said that his intended target on the play had been Maglie. Williams was able to finish the game and appear in 82 games for the 1955 Giants. But he reinjured his back in midseason and persistent back pain forced his retirement as a player at the age of 27. Teammate Alvin Dark recalled that Williams was never the same after the collision.

In a six-season career, Williams was a .252 hitter (450-for-1,785) with 32 home runs and 163 RBI in 517 games, including 235 runs, 163 RBI, 61 doubles, 10 triples and six stolen bases. A good contact, free swinger hitter, he collected 164 walks and 144 strikeouts in 1,993 plate appearances. At second base, he recorded a .978 fielding percentage (52 errors in 2,323 chances).

== Coach and manager ==
Immediately following his playing career, Williams coached for the Giants in 1956 and 1957, their final two seasons in New York before their move to San Francisco. He briefly managed the Dallas Rangers of the Double-A Texas League in 1958 before leaving baseball.

== Personal life ==
Following the Giants' trade of Eddie Stanky, Williams became roommates with Alvin Dark. Dark remembered that Williams used to go out drinking after games and not return to hotels until late. However, in 1953, Williams checked himself into the Mayo Clinic. He called Dark and said that he was giving up drinking because it was complicating a nerve problem he had been diagnosed with.

Williams died in Dallas at the age of 81.
