= The Rookie (painting) =

1957 painting by Norman Rockwell

The Rookie (Red Sox Locker Room)
- Artist: Norman Rockwell
- Year: 1957
- Medium: Oil on canvas
- Dimensions: 104 cm × 99 cm (41 in × 39 in)
- Location: Private collection

The Rookie or The Rookie (Red Sox Locker Room) is a 1957 painting by American artist Norman Rockwell, painted for the March 2, 1957, cover of The Saturday Evening Post magazine.

The painting depicts several Boston Red Sox baseball players in a locker room, joined by an apparent new player who is dressed in street clothes and carrying a suitcase, along with his baseball glove and baseball bat. The painting was sold in a 2014 auction for over twenty million dollars.

== Creation ==
Rockwell wanted to create a spring training-themed cover for The Saturday Evening Post, and in August 1956 three Red Sox players (Frank Sullivan, Jackie Jensen, and Sammy White) drove to his studio in Stockbridge, Massachusetts, to pose for reference photographs. Ted Williams and Billy Goodman are depicted in the painting but did not make the studio trip, so Rockwell used other images of them. Rockwell selected a high school student, Sherman Safford from nearby Pittsfield, Massachusetts, to pose for reference photos of the rookie baseball player. Inspiration for the rookie player may have been Mickey McDermott, who joined the Red Sox in 1948 and was featured in a photograph in Life magazine. Rockwell visited Sarasota, Florida, and took photographs of the actual Red Sox spring training locker room at Payne Park.

== Composition ==
The painting features five members of the 1956 Boston Red Sox, who were also with the team in 1957 when the painting appeared on the cover of The Saturday Evening Post;

- outfielder Ted Williams, standing in the center of the image
- outfielder Jackie Jensen, tying his shoe and seated in front of Williams
- pitcher Frank Sullivan, seated to the left of Jensen (the '8' of Sullivan's uniform number 18 is clearly seen)
- catcher Sammy White, seated at far left, wearing his catcher's mitt
- infielder Billy Goodman, standing at far right, with his hand covering his mouth

Additionally featured in the painting are the eponymous rookie, standing between Williams and Goodman, and a fictitious player standing at far left whom Rockwell called "John J. Anonymous," and was based on reference photos of Rockwell's studio assistant Louie Lamone. With the death of Frank Sullivan in January 2016, none of the featured Red Sox players are still alive.

== 2014 auction ==
The painting was sold at auction in May 2014 by Christie's for $22,565,000, including the buyer's premium. A few weeks before being auctioned, it was publicly displayed at the Museum of Fine Arts, Boston. The painting had previously been sold in 1986 for $600,000.
