= Jackie Jensen =

American baseball player (1927–1982)

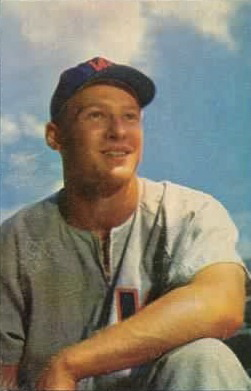
- Jensen in 1953
- Right fielder
- Born: March 9, 1927; San Francisco, California, U.S.
- Died: July 14, 1982 (aged 55); Charlottesville, Virginia, U.S.
- Batted: Right Threw: Right

MLB debut
- April 18, 1950, for the New York Yankees

Last MLB appearance
- October 1, 1961, for the Boston Red Sox

MLB statistics
- Batting average: .279
- Home runs: 199
- Runs batted in: 929
- Stats at Baseball Reference

Teams
- New York Yankees (1950–1952); Washington Senators (1952–1953); Boston Red Sox (1954–1959, 1961)

Career highlights and awards
- 3× All-Star (1952, 1955, 1958); World Series champion (1950); AL MVP (1958); Gold Glove Award (1959); 3× AL RBI leader (1955, 1958, 1959); AL stolen base leader (1954); Boston Red Sox Hall of Fame

Jack Eugene Jensen (March 9, 1927 – July 14, 1982) was an American right fielder in Major League Baseball who played for three American League (AL) teams from 1950 to 1961, most notably the Boston Red Sox. He was named the AL's Most Valuable Player (MVP) in 1958 after hitting 35 home runs and leading the league with 122 runs batted in (RBIs); he also led the league in RBIs two other years, and in triples and stolen bases once each. Respected for his throwing arm, he won a Gold Glove Award and led the AL in assists and double plays twice each. He retired in his early thirties as major-league baseball expanded westward, due to an intense fear of flying. After being a two-sport star in college, Jensen was the first person to play in the Rose Bowl, the World Series, and the MLB All-Star Game. (Note: Only one other person, Chuck Essegian, has managed the feat of appearing in both a Rose Bowl (1951) and a World Series (1959).)

== Early years ==
Jensen was born in San Francisco, California. His parents divorced when he was five, and he was raised by his mother, who frequently moved the family. After serving in the Navy toward the end of World War II, he became an All-American in two sports at the University of California. As a baseball pitcher and outfielder, he helped California to win the inaugural College World Series in 1947. He pitched Cal to victory in the regional final by outdueling Bobby Layne of Texas, and in the championship Cal defeated a Yale team featuring future President George Bush. As a football halfback, Jensen was a consensus All-American as a junior in 1948, becoming the first Cal player to rush for 1,000 yards. In the season-ending 7–6 victory over Stanford he ran for 170 yards, kicked a punt for 67 yards, and had a 32-yard run late in the game in a 4th-and-31 situation. Cal ended the regular season at 10–0 under coach Pappy Waldorf, winning a share of its first Pacific Coast Conference title in ten years, and Jensen placed fourth in the Heisman Trophy voting, with Doak Walker taking the award. In the 1949 Rose Bowl, Jensen scored a touchdown in the first quarter to tie the game 7–7, but fourth-ranked Cal was upset 20–14 by seventh-ranked Northwestern.

== Baseball career ==
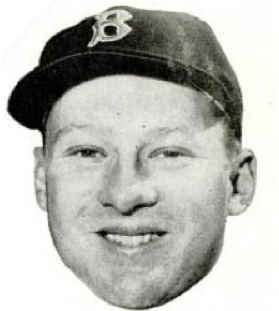
Jensen with the Red Sox

In 1949, Jensen, who batted and threw right-handed, left college after his junior year and signed with the Oakland Oaks in the Pacific Coast League. His contract – along with Billy Martin's – was sold to the New York Yankees in 1950 with the intention of him being a backup for future Hall of Fame centerfielder Joe DiMaggio. But he played in only 108 games for the Yankees over three years, primarily in left field. He appeared as a pinch runner for Bobby Brown in the eighth inning of Game 3 of the 1950 World Series against the Philadelphia Phillies, but was in the game only briefly before Johnny Mize popped up to end the inning. Jensen did not stay in the game defensively, and the Yankees completed a sweep of the Phillies in Game 4. Mickey Mantle appeared in 1951 as DiMaggio's heir-apparent, preempting Jensen and starting in right field. Jensen did not appear in the 1951 Series against the New York Giants.

In May 1952 Jensen was sent to the Washington Senators in a six-player deal, and he made his first All-Star team. He finished the season with a .286 batting average and 80 RBIs, leading the league with 17 assists and placing third in the AL with 18 steals, a total he duplicated in 1953. He was traded to the Red Sox in December 1953, and led the AL with 22 steals in 1954, also finishing third in RBIs (117) and fourth in home runs (25). But despite his speed he also set a major league record by grounding into double plays 32 times, breaking fellow Red Sox Bobby Doerr's 1949 total of 31; the record would stand until Red Sock Jim Rice grounded into 36 double plays in 1984. No longer facing the pressure of becoming his team's principal star, Jensen again made the All-Star team in 1955, leading the league with 116 RBIs and finishing tenth in the MVP vote.

In 1956 Jensen batted a career-high .315 and led the AL with 11 triples, and in 1957 he had 103 RBIs and led the league in both assists (16) and double plays (4). The 31 year-old star had his best season in 1958, earning the AL MVP and beating out Bob Turley, Rocky Colavito and Bob Cerv with a .286 batting average, a league-leading 122 RBIs, also placing second in the AL with 99 walks and fifth in home runs (35), doubles (31), total bases (293) and on-base percentage (.396). In June of that same year, he set a Red Sox club record for most home runs in a single month (since tied by David Ortiz) with 14, and in July made his final All-Star team. In 1959 he again led the league in RBIs (112) and won his only Gold Glove after leading the AL in double plays (4) for the second time; he also scored a career-best 101 runs and stole 20 bases, finishing third in the AL in steals for the fourth time among his seven Top 10 finishes. He came in tenth in the MVP balloting.

=== Retirement ===
Smack in his productive prime at 32, Jensen announced his retirement from baseball in January 1960, primarily because of an intense fear of flying, but also the result of the long separations from his family. He stated, "I have only one life to live, and I'll be happier when I can spend it with my family. Being away from home with a baseball team for seven months a year doesn't represent the kind of life I want or the kind of life my wife and children want." Indeed, upon his trade to the Red Sox in 1953 he considered not reporting to the team in order to return to his family in California, but general manager Joe Cronin increased his salary by $1,000, and he agreed to play. As teams had increasingly turned to air travel in the 1950s, he had unsuccessfully sought to combat his aversion to flying, aided considerably by Red Sox owner Tom Yawkey, who arranged for therapy treatments. Once major-league baseball expanded to the West Coast in 1958, and with further expansion and constant air travel foreseen, Jensen's difficulties became virtually insurmountable.

Jensen made a comeback attempt with Boston in 1961, but turned to hypnotherapy when his panic attacks at airports became unbearable. Frustrated by a sub-par season (.263, 66 RBIs), he retired again for good. In an 11-season career, Jensen was a .279 hitter with 199 home runs and 929 RBIs in 1,438 games. He also scored 810 runs, had 1,463 hits, 259 doubles, 45 triples, 143 stolen bases, and 750 walks, for a .369 on-base percentage and .460 slugging percentage. He finished his career with a .977 fielding percentage playing at all three outfield positions.

== Television appearances ==
On April 17, 1956, Jensen appeared as himself, with Vivi Janiss as his mother, in "The Jackie Jensen Story," which aired on the NBC anthology television series Cavalcade of America. Child actor Gary Gray played Jensen as a sixteen-year-old.

Jensen appeared in four episodes of Home Run Derby, which aired in 1960. He was 2–2 in his appearances, defeating Ernie Banks and Rocky Colavito, while losing twice to Mickey Mantle.

== Later life ==
Following his retirement, Jensen became sports director at radio station KTVN in Reno, Nevada, worked as a college football broadcaster for ABC television, and coached baseball at the University of Nevada and at the University of California, Berkeley. He also managed the minor league Jamestown Falcons in 1970. He was co-owner of the Bow & Bell restaurant with Charles "Boots" Erb in Jack London Square in Oakland, California.

On October 16, 1949, Jensen married Zoe Ann Olsen, the silver medalist in diving at the 1948 Summer Olympics; the couple divorced on May 18, 1963, remarried on July 11, 1964, and divorced again on January 17, 1968. In February 1968, he married Katherine Cortezi. Jensen had three children by his first wife – Jon, Jan, and Jay. Jay's son Tucker Jensen pitched in two NCAA Division II baseball tournaments for Embry–Riddle Aeronautical University, pitched in the Toronto Blue Jays organization during 2011–2012, and pitched for the Gateway Grizzlies of the independent Frontier League during 2013–2014.

Jensen died on the way to University of Virginia Hospital in Charlottesville, Virginia, at the age of 55 after suffering an apparent heart attack at his home near Scottsville, Virginia. He is interred in Amherst, Virginia.

== Legacy ==
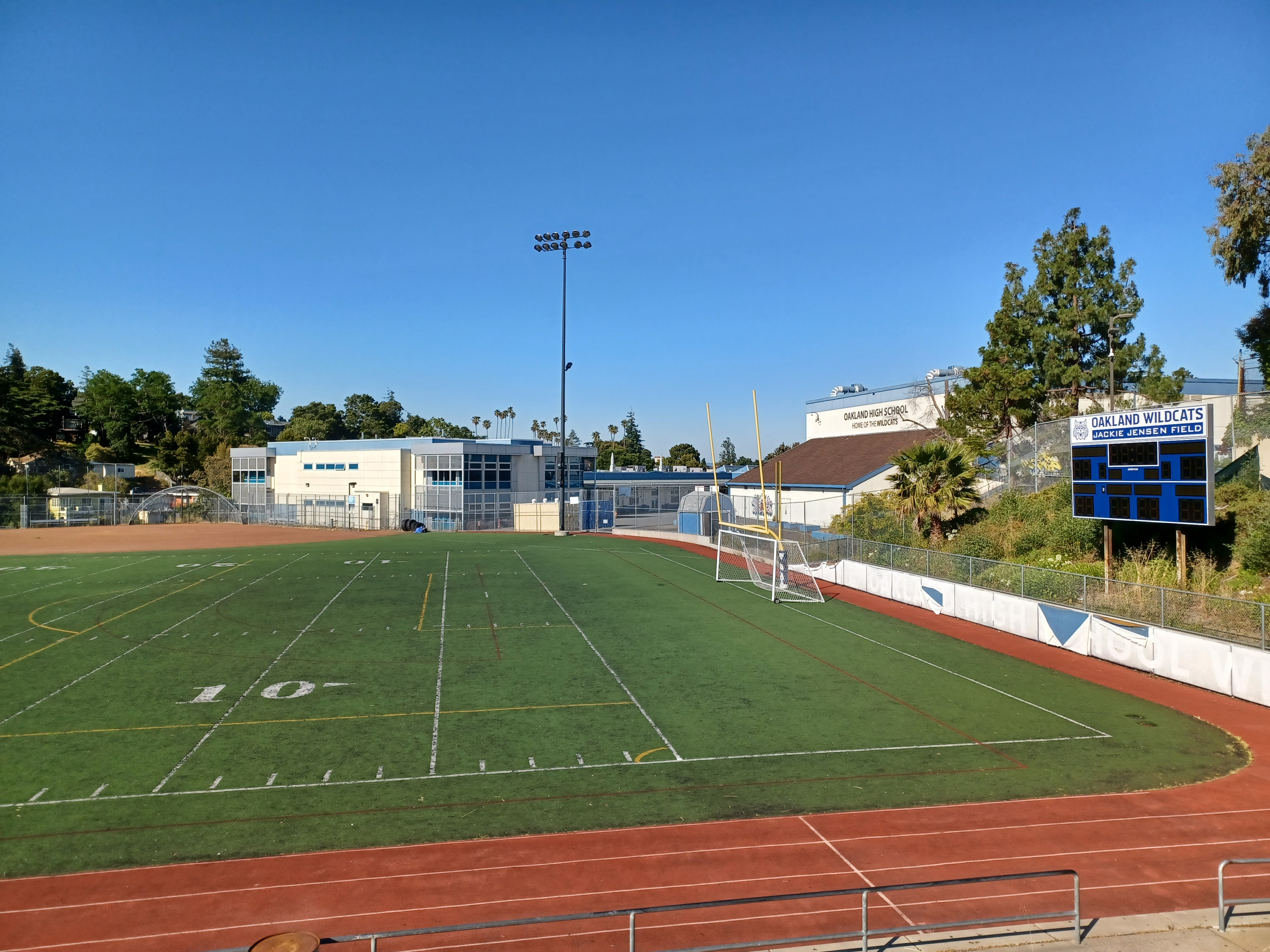
Jackie Jensen Field at Oakland High School

Jensen was one of several Red Sox players featured in the 1957 Norman Rockwell painting The Rookie.

Jensen was inducted into the Bay Area Sports Hall of Fame in 1983, the College Football Hall of Fame in 1984, and the Boston Red Sox Hall of Fame in 2000. Also in 2000, The Golden Boy: A Biography of Jackie Jensen was published, with a foreword by Curt Gowdy.

== See also ==
- List of Major League Baseball annual runs batted in leaders
- List of Major League Baseball annual stolen base leaders
- List of Major League Baseball annual triples leaders
