= Bill Engeln =

American baseball umpire (1898-1968)

- Born: William Raymond Engeln; September 9, 1898; St. Louis, Missouri, U.S.
- Died: April 17, 1968 (aged 69); Palo Alto, California, U.S.
- Occupation: Umpire
- Years active: 1952-1956
- Employer: National League

William Raymond Engeln (September 9, 1898 – April 17, 1968) was an American professional baseball umpire who worked in the National League from 1952 to 1956. Engeln was the right field umpire in the 1953 Major League Baseball All-Star Game. In his career, he umpired 749 major league games.

== Early life and career ==
Engeln was born in St. Louis, Missouri and served as a bat boy for the St. Louis Browns when he was young. As an umpire, he spent sixteen seasons (1936 through 1951) in the Pacific Coast League before being promoted to the majors. In 1945, Engeln was surrounded by angry fans after a ninth-inning third strike in a game between the Portland Beavers and Seattle Rainiers. He was attacked by two women who were then led away by police.

== Notable games ==
Engeln also officiated on July 31, 1954, when Joe Adcock hit four home runs in one game. He was behind the plate a day later when Adcock was hit in the head by a Clem Labine pitch. The pitch precipitated a near-physical confrontation between Jackie Robinson and Lew Burdette as Adcock was carried off the field by stretcher.

== Death ==
Engeln died in Palo Alto, California on April 17, 1968.
