= Sammy White's Brighton Bowl =

Bowling alley in Boston, Massachusetts

Sammy White's Brighton Bowl, or simply Sammy White's, was a bowling alley in the Brighton section of Boston, Massachusetts. It was named after and owned by Boston Red Sox catcher Sammy White and featured lanes of both standard Ten-Pin and Candlepin bowling, the latter being the more popular style in New England. The bowling alley is most remembered for an infamous quadruple murder that occurred there in 1980. Sammy White's closed its doors in 1986. A second Sammy White's bowling alley was on the V.F.W. Parkway near the Boston/Dedham line. It closed in the mid-1980s.

Sammy White also owned the Alpine Lanes, a ten-pin establishment, in Chelmsford, Massachusetts.

== Murders ==
On the morning of September 22, 1980, during a robbery that resulted in the theft of $4,800, four employees were brutally bludgeoned and shot execution style. Found at the scene was a bloody bowling pin determined to be the weapon used to bludgeon the victims. Three died at the scene, and the fourth on the way to the hospital. The victims were found when an employee came in and discovered the open safe and contacted the police. They were identified as George Hagelstein, 40, Donald Doroni, 40, David Cobe, 22 and Brian Cobe, 23.

After an investigation, the police arrested cab driver Bryan A. Dyer of Somerville. Dyer had worked at Sammy White's in 1973. During the trial, witnesses testified that in the days following the murders Dyer had paid off an overdue car loan as well as prepaid three months rent at the YMCA where he had been living. Dyer was convicted and sentenced to life imprisonment for all four murders; he died in prison in 2011.

The bowling alley murders brought new attention to the question of capital punishment in Massachusetts. In 1982, a ballot referendum legalizing the death penalty in Massachusetts passed and was signed into law by the outgoing governor, Edward J. King. In 1984, the law was struck down by the Massachusetts Supreme Judicial Court as unconstitutional.

== Popular culture ==
Filmmaker Eli Roth has stated that the Sammy White's murders were the inspiration for the gruesome campfire story described in the film Cabin Fever.

Sammy White's Brighton Bowl was the taping location for WHDH-TV and WCVB-TV Channel 5's Candlepin Bowling (1958–1985), Winning Pins, and Candlepin Superbowl television sport shows.
