= Frank Sullivan (baseball) =

American baseball player (1930–2016)

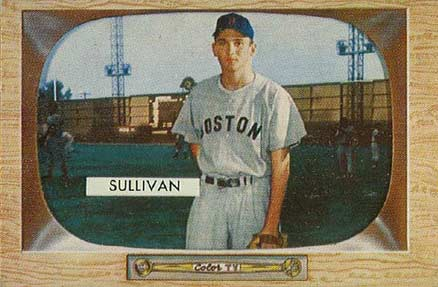
- Pitcher
- Born: January 23, 1930; Hollywood, California, U.S.
- Died: January 19, 2016 (aged 85); Lihue, Hawaii, U.S.
- Batted: Right Threw: Right

MLB debut
- July 31, 1953, for the Boston Red Sox

Last MLB appearance
- June 12, 1963, for the Minnesota Twins

MLB statistics
- Win–loss record: 97–100
- Earned run average: 3.60
- Strikeouts: 959
- Stats at Baseball Reference

Teams
- Boston Red Sox (1953–1960); Philadelphia Phillies (1961–1962); Minnesota Twins (1962–1963)

Career highlights and awards
- 2× All-Star (1955, 1956); AL wins leader (1955); Boston Red Sox Hall of Fame

Franklin Leal Sullivan (January 23, 1930 – January 19, 2016), was an American professional baseball right-handed pitcher, who played in Major League Baseball (MLB) for the Boston Red Sox, Philadelphia Phillies, and Minnesota Twins over parts of eleven seasons, spanning 1953–1963. Sullivan was named to the American League (AL) All-Star team, in 1955 and 1956, and was elected to the Boston Red Sox Hall of Fame, in 2008. Sullivan grew up in Burbank, California, and was an outstanding baseball and basketball player at Burbank High.Sullivan graduated from Burbank High School in 1947, where his classmates included actor Vic Tayback.

Sullivan was one of the tallest pitchers of his time, standing 6 feet 6 inches (1.98 m) tall. After the 1960 season, the Red Sox traded him to the Phillies for another towering right-hander, 6 ft 8 in (2.03 m)-tall Gene Conley. Coincidentally, Conley had been the winning pitcher and Sullivan the loser of the 1955 All-Star Game. A walk-off home run by Stan Musial on the first pitch from Sullivan in the bottom of the 12th inning brought the midsummer classic to an abrupt end. Sullivan had entered the game with two men out in the eighth and had held the National League (NL) scoreless for 31/3 innings prior to Musial's clout.

In 1955, Sullivan topped the AL with 260 innings pitched and tied with Whitey Ford for the most wins (18). For his career, he posted a 97–100 win–loss record, with a 3.60 earned run average (ERA), in 351 pitching appearances. He dropped 18 of his 21 National League decisions as a member of the Phillies, but went 94–82 in the American League. Overall, Sullivan permitted 1,702 hits and 559 bases on balls in 1,732 MLB innings pitched. He struck out 959.

In September 2008, Sullivan published a memoir entitled, Life Is More Than 9 Innings.

He was one of the subjects of the 1957 Norman Rockwell painting The Rookie.

Sullivan died in Lihue, Hawaii, from pneumonia on January 19, 2016, at the age of 85.

== See also ==
- List of Major League Baseball annual wins leaders
