= 2028 Major League Baseball All-Star Game =

Upcoming All-Star baseball game

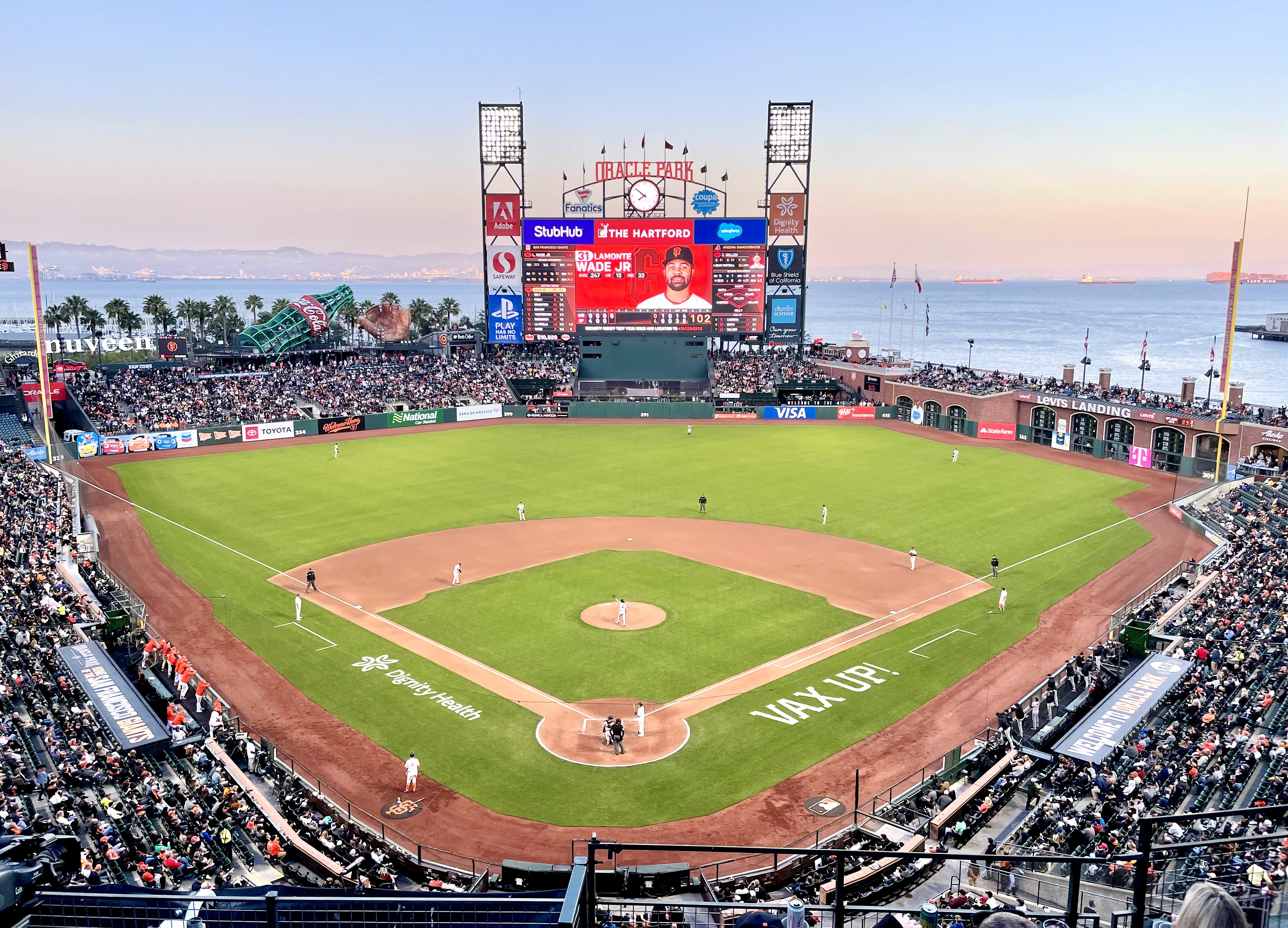
- Teams: American League; National League
- Date: July 2028
- Venue: Oracle Park
- City: San Francisco, California
- Television: Fox
- TV announcers: TBD
- Radio: TBD
- Radio announcers: TBD

The 2028 Major League Baseball All-Star Game is the planned 98th Major League Baseball All-Star Game played between the American League (AL) and the National League (NL) of Major League Baseball. The game is scheduled to be played in July 2028 and televised nationally by Fox. The game would be hosted by the San Francisco Giants at Oracle Park in San Francisco, California. Like the rest of the 2027 MLB season and beyond, the game is contingent on MLB and the Major League Baseball Players Association (MLBPA) signing a new collective bargaining agreement (CBA) to replace that one that expires on December 1, 2026.

== Background ==
=== Host selection ===
The San Francisco Giants were awarded the game on August 14, 2026. This will be the second time that the Giants and Oracle Park will host an All-Star Game, and the fourth All-Star Game in the city of San Francisco. The Giants previously hosted in 1961, 1984, and 2007.
