= 1953 Major League Baseball All-Star Game =

1953 American baseball competition

	1	2	3	4	5	6	7	8	9	R	H	E
American League	0	0	0	0	0	0	0	0	1	1	5	0
National League	0	0	0	0	2	0	1	2	x	5	10	0
- Date: July 14, 1953
- Venue: Crosley Field
- City: Cincinnati
- Managers: Casey Stengel (New York Yankees); Charlie Dressen (Brooklyn Dodgers)
- Attendance: 30,846 – Time of Game: 2:19
- Ceremonial first pitch: Ted Williams
- Television: NBC
- TV announcers: Jack Brickhouse and Mel Allen
- Radio: Mutual
- Radio announcers: Al Helfer and Waite Hoyt

The 1953 Major League Baseball All-Star Game was the 20th playing of the mid-summer classic between the All-Stars teams of the American League (AL) and National League (NL), the two leagues comprising Major League Baseball. The game was held on July 14 at Crosley Field in Cincinnati, home of the Cincinnati Redlegs of the National League. The team changed its name from Reds to Redlegs this season, during the height of anti-communism in the United States; it returned to the Reds six years later.

This was the second All-Star Game at Crosley Field, which had previously hosted fifteen years earlier in 1938. This game was originally scheduled for Braves Field in Boston, which had hosted in 1936. When the Braves relocated to Milwaukee in mid-March, the game was awarded to Cincinnati.

== Summary ==
From 1949 through 1952, manager Casey Stengel had taken the New York Yankees to four consecutive World Series titles, but this time turned on his fourth defeat in a row at the helm of the American League team.

Robin Roberts (NL) and Billy Pierce (AL) found themselves in a pitching duel during three innings of one-hit shutout ball, but they were not a factor in the decision. AL relievers Allie Reynolds (2), Mike Garcia (1) and Satchel Paige (2) combined to give up five runs to the NL hitters.

The NL attack was led by Enos Slaughter, who went 2-for-3 with two runs and an RBI, while Pee Wee Reese hit a single and a double and drove in two runs. Minnie Miñoso went 2-for-2 and drove in the only run for the AL team.

NL relievers Warren Spahn and Curt Simmons pitched two scoreless innings each and Murry Dickson allowed the only AL run in two innings of work. Spahn was the winning pitcher and Reynolds the loser, while Dickson earned the save.

The National League extended their winning-streak to four consecutive games, matching the previous record set by the American League from 1946 to 1949, After the game, the American League leads 12–8.

== Notes ==
- The relief appearance by 46-year-old Satchel Paige in the eighth inning was an All-Star record for oldest pitcher in the contest.
- It was the first All-Star Game without a home run since 1944 at Forbes Field, and the third overall since 1938 at Crosley Field.
- Ted Williams threw out the ceremonial first pitch of the game just four days after being released from military service. Selected for the American League roster in the poll he did not play in the game. Williams signed a new contract with the Boston Red Sox and began working out with the club in late July.

== Opening lineups ==
American League			National League
Player	Team	Pos	Player	Team	Pos
Billy Goodman	Boston Red Sox	2B	Pee Wee Reese	Brooklyn Dodgers	SS
Mickey Vernon	Washington Senators	1B	Red Schoendienst	St. Louis Cardinals	2B
Hank Bauer	New York Yankees	RF	Stan Musial	St. Louis Cardinals	LF
Mickey Mantle	New York Yankees	CF	Ted Kluszewski	Cincinnati Redlegs	1B
Al Rosen	Cleveland Indians	3B	Roy Campanella	Brooklyn Dodgers	C
Gus Zernial	Philadelphia Athletics	LF	Eddie Mathews	Milwaukee Braves	3B
Yogi Berra	New York Yankees	C	Gus Bell	Cincinnati Redlegs	CF
Chico Carrasquel	Chicago White Sox	SS	Enos Slaughter	St. Louis Cardinals	RF
Billy Pierce	Chicago White Sox	P	Robin Roberts	Philadelphia Phillies	P

== Rosters ==
Players in italics have since been inducted into the National Baseball Hall of Fame.

1953 American League All-Star Game roster
Pitchers: 25 (United States) Mike Garcia; 21 (United States) Bob Lemon *; 29 (United States) Satchel Paige; 19 (United States) Billy Pierce; 22 (United States) Allie Reynolds; 11 (United States) Johnny Sain *; Catchers: 8 (United States) Yogi Berra; 22 (United States) Sammy White *	Infielders: 17 (Venezuela) Chico Carrasquel; 8 (United States) Ferris Fain; 2 (United States) Nellie Fox; 10 (United States) Billy Goodman; 6 (United States) Billy Hunter; 1 (United States) George Kell; 26 (United States) Harvey Kuenn; 36 (United States) Johnny Mize; 10 (United States) Phil Rizzuto; 8 (United States) Eddie Robinson; 7 (United States) Al Rosen; 3 (United States) Mickey Vernon; Outfielders: 9 (United States) Hank Bauer; 14 (United States) Larry Doby; 7 (United States) Mickey Mantle; 9 (Cuba) Minnie Miñoso; 9 (United States) Ted Williams *; 19 (United States) Gus Zernial	Manager: 37 (United States) Casey Stengel; Coaches: 4 (United States) Lou Boudreau; 31 (United States) Jim Turner; * = Did not play

1953 National League All-Star Game roster
Pitchers: 22 (United States) Murry Dickson; 42 (United States) Harvey Haddix *; 36 (United States) Robin Roberts; 28 (United States) Curt Simmons; 21 (United States) Warren Spahn; 14 (United States) Gerry Staley *; 49 (United States) Hoyt Wilhelm *; Catchers: 39 (United States) Roy Campanella; 1 (United States) Del Crandall *; 8 (United States) Clyde McCullough *; 18 (United States) Del Rice *; 9 (United States) Wes Westrum *	Infielders: 2 (United States) Granny Hamner; 14 (United States) Gil Hodges; 18 (United States) Ted Kluszewski; 41 (United States) Eddie Mathews; 1 (United States) Pee Wee Reese; 2 (United States) Red Schoendienst; 10 (United States) Davey Williams; Outfielders: 1 (United States) Richie Ashburn; 25 (United States) Gus Bell; 6 (United States) Carl Furillo *; 4 (United States) Ralph Kiner; 6 (United States) Stan Musial; 42 (United States) Jackie Robinson; 9 (United States) Enos Slaughter; 4 (United States) Duke Snider	Manager: 7 (United States) Charlie Dressen; Coaches: 22 (United States) Billy Herman; 27 (United States) Cookie Lavagetto; 31 (United States) Jake Pitler; * = Did not play

== Umpires ==
Position	Umpire
Home Plate	Jocko Conlan (NL)
First Base	Johnny Stevens (AL)
Second Base	Augie Donatelli (NL)
Third Base	Bill McKinley (AL)
Left Field	Bill Engeln (NL)
Right Field	Larry Napp (AL)

== Line score ==
Tuesday, July 14, 1953 1:30 pm (ET) at Crosley Field in Cincinnati, Ohio
Team	1	2	3	4	5	6	7	8	9	R	H	E
American League	0	0	0	0	0	0	0	0	1	1	5	0
National League	0	0	0	0	2	0	1	2	x	5	10	0
WP: Spahn LP: Reynolds Sv: Dickson

How the runs scored
Team	Inning	Play	AL	NL
NL	5th	Ashburn singled, Mathews scored, Slaughter to second; Reese singled, Slaughter scored, Ashburn to second	0	2
NL	7th	Reese doubled, Slaughter scored	0	3
NL	8th	Slaughter singled, Campanella scored, Snider to third; Dickson singled, Snider scored	0	5
AL	9th	Miñoso singled, Fain scored, Mize to second	1	5

Play-by-play at Retrosheet
