= 1955 Major League Baseball All-Star Game =

1955 American baseball competition

	1	2	3	4	5	6	7	8	9	10	11	12	R	H	E
American League	4	0	0	0	0	1	0	0	0	0	0	0	5	10	2
National League	0	0	0	0	0	0	2	3	0	0	0	1	6	13	1
- Date: July 12, 1955
- Venue: Milwaukee County Stadium
- City: Milwaukee, Wisconsin
- Managers: Al López (Cleveland Indians); Leo Durocher (New York Giants)
- Attendance: 45,643 – Time of Game: 3:17
- Television: NBC
- TV announcers: Mel Allen and Al Helfer
- Radio: Mutual
- Radio announcers: Bob Neal and Earl Gillespie

The 1955 Major League Baseball All-Star Game was the 22nd playing of the midsummer classic between the all-stars of the American League (AL) and National League (NL), the two leagues comprising Major League Baseball. The game was held on July 12, 1955, at Milwaukee County Stadium, the home of the Milwaukee Braves of the National League.

== Summary ==
The National League overcame a five-run deficit to defeat the American League, 6–5, in this edition of the midsummer classic. Stan Musial led off the bottom of the 12th inning by drilling a home run to deep right field on the first pitch from Frank Sullivan, pulling off one of the greatest victories in All-Star Game history.

The National League began their comeback in the bottom of the seventh inning. Willie Mays led off the frame with a single off Whitey Ford, and after two outs, Hank Aaron walked and Johnny Logan singled to drive home Mays and make it a 5–1 game. Next batter Stan Lopata reached base on an error, and Aaron scored the second run off the inning before the third out was made.

With two outs in the eight inning, Mays, Ted Kluszewski and Randy Jackson hit consecutive singles for a run, and Ford was replaced by Sullivan. Aaron greeted him with an RBI single scoring Kluszewski to knot the game at 5–5.

The American League quickly took the lead in the top of the first inning when Harvey Kuenn and Nellie Fox hit consecutive singles against Robin Roberts, with Kuenn advancing to third base from first and later scoring on a wild pitch. Then Ted Williams walked and Mickey Mantle hit a three-run home run, before Roberts recorded his first out. In the sixth inning, Mickey Vernon grounded out to drive home Yogi Berra to give the American League a five-run cushion.

In the ninth inning, Joe Nuxhall and Sullivan matched strikeouts as the All-Star Game went into extra innings for only the second time since 1950, which turned out to be the first year the game went more than nine innings.

The contest remained tied until the 12th inning, when Gene Conley struck out all three AL batters he faced. Then came the walk-off by Musial, which was his fourth homer in All-Star games, breaking a tie with Ted Williams and Ralph Kiner.

It was the fifth victory for the National League in the last six All-Star games, even though the American League still held a 13–9 overall advantage.

== Notes ==
- Billy Pierce sailed through his three innings of work for the American League, facing the minimum nine batters while striking out three without walks. Red Schoendienst led off the first inning with a single, but was out trying to advance to second on a pitch in the dirt that Yogi Berra managed to smother.
- Early Wynn relieved Pierce in the fourth, and he tossed three shutout innings as well, allowing just three hits.
- Harvey Haddix took over for Roberts in the fourth and he went three innings, allowing just one run in the sixth.
- Don Newcombe (1), Sam Jones (2/3) and Joe Nuxhall (3 1/3) combined for five scoreless innings.
- Whitey Ford got the first two batters out in the eighth, but allowed three singles and a run and was replaced by Frank Sullivan, who faced 14 batters in 3 1/3 innings before the Musial's blast.
- It was the only All-Star appearance for Sullivan, the losing pitcher, who would win 18 games for the Boston Red Sox that season. In 1960, Sullivan would be traded for the winning pitcher in this game, Gene Conley.
- Both teams' pitchers combined for 23 hits and 20 strikeouts of 100 batters faced.
- Roy Campanella was selected for the National League roster in the poll, but he did not play in the game due to a leg injury and was replaced by Stan Lopata.
- Ironically, this game was played the same day on which funeral services were held for Arch Ward, the sports editor for the Chicago Tribune, who had founded the All-Star Game in 1933.

== Starting lineups ==
American League			National League
Player	Team	Pos	Player	Team	Pos
Harvey Kuenn	Detroit Tigers	SS	Red Schoendienst	St. Louis Cardinals	2B
Nellie Fox	Chicago White Sox	2B	Del Ennis	Philadelphia Phillies	LF
Ted Williams	Boston Red Sox	LF	Duke Snider	Brooklyn Dodgers	CF
Mickey Mantle	New York Yankees	CF	Ted Kluszewski	Cincinnati Redlegs	1B
Yogi Berra	New York Yankees	C	Eddie Mathews	Milwaukee Braves	3B
Al Kaline	Detroit Tigers	RF	Don Mueller	New York Giants	RF
Mickey Vernon	Washington Senators	1B	Ernie Banks	Chicago Cubs	SS
Jim Finigan	Kansas City Athletics	3B	Del Crandall	Milwaukee Braves	C
Billy Pierce	Chicago White Sox	P	Robin Roberts	Philadelphia Phillies	P

== Rosters ==
Players in italics have since been inducted into the National Baseball Hall of Fame.

1955 American League All-Star Game roster
Pitchers: 19 (United States) Dick Donovan *; 19 (United States) Billy Pierce; 16 (United States) Whitey Ford; 38 (United States) Billy Hoeft *; 27 (United States) Herb Score *; 18 (United States) Frank Sullivan; 19 (United States) Bob Turley *; 36 (United States) Jim Wilson *; 24 (United States) Early Wynn *; Catchers: 8 (United States) Yogi Berra; 10 (United States) Sherm Lollar *	Infielders: 1 (Mexico) Bobby Ávila; 17 (Venezuela) Chico Carrasquel; 4 (United States) Jim Finigan; 2 (United States) Nellie Fox; 7 (United States) Harvey Kuenn; 3 (United States) Mickey Vernon; 7 (Puerto Rico) Vic Power; 7 (United States) Al Rosen; Outfielders: 14 (United States) Larry Doby *; 4 (United States) Jackie Jensen; 6 (United States) Al Kaline; 7 (United States) Mickey Mantle; 32 (United States) Al Smith; 9 (United States) Ted Williams	Manager: 10 (United States) Al López; Coaches: 44 (United States) Tony Cuccinello; 39 (United States) Don Gutteridge; * = Did not play

1955 National League All-Star Game roster
Pitchers: 38 (Puerto Rico) Luis Arroyo *; 22 (United States) Gene Conley; 27 (United States) Sam Jones; 42 (United States) Harvey Haddix; 36 (United States) Don Newcombe; 39 (United States) Joe Nuxhall; 36 (United States) Robin Roberts; Catchers: 21 (United States) Smoky Burgess; 39 (United States) Roy Campanella *; 1 (United States) Del Crandall; 29 (United States) Stan Lopata	Infielders: 37 (United States) Gene Baker; 14 (United States) Ernie Banks; 14 (United States) Gil Hodges; 2 (United States) Randy Jackson; 18 (United States) Ted Kluszewski; 23 (United States) Johnny Logan; 41 (United States) Eddie Mathews; 6 (United States) Stan Musial; 2 (United States) Red Schoendienst; Outfielders: 44 (United States) Hank Aaron; 14 (United States) Del Ennis; 24 (United States) Willie Mays; 22 (United States) Don Mueller; 4 (United States) Duke Snider; 15 (United States) Frank Thomas	Manager: 2 (United States) Leo Durocher; Coaches: 2 (United States) Fred Haney; 24 (United States) Mayo Smith; * = Did not play

== Umpires ==
Position	Umpire
Home Plate	Al Barlick (NL)
First Base	Hank Soar (AL)
Second Base	Dusty Boggess (NL)
Third Base	Bill Summers (AL)
Left Field	Frank Secory (NL)
Right Field	Ed Runge (AL)

== Line score ==
Tuesday, July 12, 1955 2:00 pm (CT) at County Stadium in Milwaukee, Wisconsin
Team	1	2	3	4	5	6	7	8	9	10	11	12	R	H	E
American League	4	0	0	0	0	1	0	0	0	0	0	0	5	10	2
National League	0	0	0	0	0	0	2	3	0	0	0	1	6	13	1
WP: Conley LP: Sullivan; Home runs: AL: Mantle; NL: Musial

Winning Run scored with 0 outs

How the runs scored
Team	Inning	Play	AL	NL
AL	1st	Kuenn scored on a wild pitch; Mantle homered, Fox and Williams scored	4	0
AL	6th	Vernon grounded out, Berra scored	5	0
NL	7th	Logan singled, Mays scored, Aaron to third; Lopata safe on error, Aaron scored	5	2
NL	9th	Jackson singled, Mays scored, Kluszewski to third; Aaron singled, Kluszewski and Jackson scored	5	5
NL	12th	Musial homered to right	5	6

Play-by-play at Retrosheet
