= Rookie of the Year =

Rookie of the Year may refer to:

- Rookie of the Year (award), a sports award for the most outstanding rookie in a given season
- Rookie of the Year (film), a 1993 film starring Thomas Ian Nicholas
- Rookie of the Year (TV drama), a 1955 short film by John Ford, starring John Wayne
- Rookie of the Year (album) by rapper Ya Boy
- Rookie of the Year (band), an indie rock band from Fayetteville, North Carolina
- "Rookie of the Year", a song from Funeral for a Friend's album Casually Dressed & Deep in Conversation
- "Rookie of the Year", a song by Moneybagg Yo
- "Rookie of the Year", a song by Protect
- "Rookie of the Year", a song by Chris Webby
