= 2014 Detroit Tigers season =

Major League Baseball season

2014 Detroit Tigers
- American League Central champions
- League: American League
- Division: Central
- Ballpark: Comerica Park
- City: Detroit, Michigan
- Record: 90–72 (.556)
- Divisional place: 1st
- Owners: Mike Ilitch
- General managers: Dave Dombrowski
- Managers: Brad Ausmus
- Television: Fox Sports Detroit (Mario Impemba, Rod Allen)
- Radio: Detroit Tigers Radio Network (Dan Dickerson, Jim Price)
- Stats: ESPN.com; Baseball Reference

The 2014 Detroit Tigers season was the team's 114th season. This was the team's first year under a mostly new coaching staff led by rookie Manager Brad Ausmus. On September 28, the last day of the regular season, the Tigers clinched the American League Central title with a 3–0 win over the Minnesota Twins. The Tigers finished one game ahead of the Kansas City Royals, with a 90–72 record. It was their fourth consecutive American League Central title. They became the first AL Central team to win four consecutive titles since the Cleveland Indians won five straight from 1995 to 1999, and the first Tigers team to ever make four consecutive postseason appearances. Despite all of this, the Tigers' season ended on October 5 when they were swept by the Baltimore Orioles in the American League Division Series. This snapped Detroit's streak of three consecutive American League Championship Series appearances.

The Tigers would not return to postseason play until 2024. As of 2026, this season remains their most recent AL Central title.

== Roster moves ==
=== Coaching staff ===
- On October 21, Jim Leyland stepped down from his managerial position after eight years with Detroit. He later confirmed that he joined the Tigers front office as a special assistant to team president/GM/CEO Dave Dombrowski.
- On November 3, the Tigers announced Brad Ausmus was named Leyland's successor, and signed to a three-year contract with a club option for 2017.
- On November 3, the Tigers announced bench coach Gene Lamont will return in the same role for the 2014 season.
- Hitting coach Lloyd McClendon did not return for 2014, as he was named the new manager of the Seattle Mariners on November 5. The Mariners later hired former Tigers bullpen coach Mike Rojas.
- On November 6, the Tigers announced Jeff Jones would return as pitching coach. They also announced the hiring of Dave Clark as third-base coach and outfield instructor.
- On November 17, the Tigers announced the hiring of Wally Joyner as hitting coach, Mick Billmeyer as bullpen coach, and Matt Martin was named to the newly created post of defensive coordinator.
- On November 18, the Tigers announced the hiring of Omar Vizquel as the first-base, infield and baserunning coach.
- On November 25, the Tigers announced the hiring of Darnell Coles as assistant hitting coach, rounding out their 2014 coaching staff.

=== Signings ===
- On November 21, the Tigers avoided arbitration with relief pitcher Phil Coke with a one-year contract.
- On December 2, the Tigers avoided arbitration with utility player Don Kelly with a one-year contract.
- On December 4, the Tigers signed closer Joe Nathan to a two-year, $20 million contract, with a club option for 2016.
- On December 11, the Tigers signed outfielder Rajai Davis to a two-year, $10 million contract.
- On December 13, the Tigers signed pitcher Joba Chamberlain to a one-year contract worth $2.5 million plus incentives.
- On January 8, the Tigers re-signed shortstop José Iglesias to a one-year, $1.65 million contract.
- On January 17, the Tigers avoided arbitration when they reached one-year deals with pitchers Al Alburquerque, Rick Porcello and Max Scherzer, and outfielders Andy Dirks and Austin Jackson. Scherzer, the reigning AL Cy Young winner, received a $15.525 million salary for 2014.
- On January 31, the Tigers avoided arbitration with catcher Alex Avila, agreeing on a one-year contract worth $4.15 million with a club option for 2015.
- On February 24, the Tigers reached one-year deals with third baseman Nick Castellanos, outfielder Steven Moya, and pitchers Drew Smyly, Kyle Lobstein, José Ortega, Luke Putkonen and Evan Reed.
- On March 1, the Tigers rounded out their 40-man roster by signing one-year deals with pitchers José Álvarez, Ian Krol, Melvin Mercedes, and Bruce Rondón; catcher Bryan Holaday, second basemen Steve Lombardozzi Jr. and Hernán Pérez, and third baseman Francisco Martínez.
- On March 24, the Tigers signed outfielder J. D. Martinez to a minor league contract.
- On March 28, the Tigers signed Miguel Cabrera to an eight-year, $248 million contract extension. Combined with the $44 million the Tigers owed on the remaining two years of Cabrera's current contract, the total ten-year commitment is worth $292 million, and will keep Cabrera under contract until at least 2023.
- On March 29, the Tigers purchased the contract of outfielder Tyler Collins from AA Erie.
- On May 2, the Tigers signed relief pitcher Joel Hanrahan to a one-year, $1 million contract, plus incentives.
- On August 5, the Tigers signed relief pitcher Jim Johnson to a minor-league contract.

=== Releases ===
- On October 30, the Tigers announced they will not re-sign backup catcher Brayan Peña.
- On November 1, the Tigers announced they had declined the option on relief pitcher José Veras' contract, making him a free agent.
- On November 1, the Tigers announced relief pitcher Darin Downs left the Tigers and was claimed off waivers by the Houston Astros, and utility player Matt Tuiasosopo left and was claimed off waivers by the Arizona Diamondbacks.
- On November 24, free agent shortstop Jhonny Peralta left the Tigers and signed a four-year deal with the St. Louis Cardinals.
- On December 4, the Tigers announced they will not re-sign free agent relief pitcher Joaquín Benoit and released him to free agency.
- On December 16, free agent second baseman Omar Infante left the Tigers and signed a four-year deal with the Kansas City Royals.
- On January 30, free agent utility infielder Ramón Santiago left the Tigers after eight years and signed a minor league contract with the Cincinnati Reds.
- On April 20, the Tigers released shortstop Álex González.

=== Trades ===
- On November 20, the Tigers traded first baseman Prince Fielder to the Texas Rangers for second baseman Ian Kinsler and cash considerations.
- On December 2, the Tigers traded starting pitcher Doug Fister to the Washington Nationals for second baseman Steve Lombardozzi Jr. and pitchers Ian Krol and Robbie Ray.
- On March 21, the Tigers traded pitcher José Álvarez to the Los Angeles Angels of Anaheim for shortstop Andrew Romine.
- On March 24, the Tigers traded second baseman Steve Lombardozzi Jr. to the Baltimore Orioles for shortstop Álex González.
- On July 23, the Tigers traded pitchers Jake Thompson and Corey Knebel to the Texas Rangers for reliever Joakim Soria.
- On July 31, the Tigers traded outfielder Austin Jackson to the Seattle Mariners, and pitcher Drew Smyly and shortstop Willy Adames to the Tampa Bay Rays in a three-team deal to acquire pitcher David Price.

== Season highlights ==
=== Individual accomplishments ===
==== Pitching ====
- On May 5, Max Scherzer became the first pitcher in franchise history to start a season with seven or more strikeouts in his first seven starts, and the first American League pitcher to do so since Mike Mussina in 2003.
- On June 12, Max Scherzer ended a drought of 178 career starts without a complete game when he pitched a complete game shutout in a three-hit 4–0 win over the Chicago White Sox. This was the longest stretch any major league starter had gone without a complete game since 1900.
- On July 1, Rick Porcello became the first Tiger to pitch back-to-back shutouts since Jack Morris in 1986. Following a 6–0 shutout win over the Texas Rangers on June 26, he shut out the Oakland Athletics 3–0 in his next start. In the latter game, Porcello became the first Major League pitcher to throw a shutout without a walk or a strikeout since Jeff Ballard on August 21, 1989, and the first Tiger pitcher to do so since Dizzy Trout in 1944.
- On July 26, Drew Smyly became the first Detroit Tigers left-hander to strike out at least 11 batters in a game since David Wells on June 4, 1993.
- On August 14, Max Scherzer recorded a season-high 14 strikeouts in a 5–2 victory over the Pittsburgh Pirates. Coincidentally, Max's career high of 15 strikeouts in a game also came at the expense of the Pirates, on May 20, 2012.
- On August 20, Rick Porcello recorded his third complete game shutout of the season in a three-hit 6–0 win over the Tampa Bay Rays. Porcello ties Henderson Álvarez for the major league lead in shutouts. Porcello's three complete game shutouts are the most by a Tiger pitcher in a single season since Jeff Weaver threw three in 2002.
- On August 21, David Price allowed one hit and one unearned run, in a complete game 1–0 loss against his former team, the Tampa Bay Rays. Price is the first pitcher in the major leagues to lose a complete game, one-hitter or better, with no earned runs since Andy Hawkins lost a no-hitter for the New York Yankees on July 1, 1990. It was the first time since 1914 that a pitcher has lost a complete game, one-hit, no walk start without allowing an earned run.
- On August 24, Max Scherzer became the American League's first 15-game winner this season after the Tigers defeated the Minnesota Twins 13–4.
- On September 28, in the AL Central division-clinching game, David Price struck out eight Minnesota Twins batters to overtake the Cleveland Indians' Corey Kluber for the most strikeouts in the major leagues. Price finished with 271 strikeouts to Kluber's 269.

==== Hitting ====
- On May 13, Víctor Martínez became the second Detroit Tigers player to hit a home run completely out of Oriole Park at Camden Yards and onto Eutaw Street, following Mickey Tettleton in 1992.
- On June 7, Nick Castellanos had his third consecutive three-hit game, making him the fifth rookie in Tigers history to do so, and the first since Ricky Peters in 1980.
- On June 14, Eugenio Suárez fell a single shy of the cycle, hitting a solo home run, double, and triple, to help the Tigers defeat the Minnesota Twins, 12–9.
- On June 30, Rajai Davis hit a walk-off grand slam to defeat the Oakland Athletics 5–4, the day the Tigers celebrated the 30th anniversary of the 1984 World Series winning team. It was the first walk-off grand slam by a Tiger since Carlos Peña on June 27, 2004, the day the Tigers celebrated the 20th anniversary of their 1984 title-winning team. The last Tigers walk-off grand slam before that was 10 years earlier, on June 21, 1994, by Lou Whitaker.
- Austin Jackson finished the month of July with 15 multi-hit games, the second most in franchise history in the month of July, behind only Ron LeFlore with 16 in 1977.
- On October 2, during Game 1 of the ALDS against the Baltimore Orioles, Ian Kinsler saw 37 pitches in four plate appearances, tying him with Bobby Abreu for fourth most in a postseason game since the statistic began being kept in 1988. Kinsler broke the record for most pitches seen in a playoff game in four or fewer plate appearances, previously held by Manny Ramirez, seeing 31 in Game 3 of the 2007 ALDS. Kinsler averaged 9.25 pitches per plate appearance, breaking the old mark of 7.75 that was also set by Ramirez in Game 3 of the 2007 ALDS.
- On October 3, during Game 2 of the ALDS against the Baltimore Orioles, J. D. Martinez became the first player in Tigers history to homer in each of his first two career postseason games, the 16th player in Major League history, and the first overall since Arizona's Paul Goldschmidt in 2011.
- Designated hitter Víctor Martínez won the American League's Silver Slugger Award at DH, with a .335 batting average (second in the AL to Houston's Jose Altuve), 32 home runs, .974 OPS (which led all of baseball), and his .409 on-base percentage (which led the AL). Martínez was also named a finalist for the American League Most Valuable Player award, finishing second to Mike Trout.

==== Defense ====
- Ian Kinsler was awarded the Wilson Defensive Player of the Year Award as the best second baseman in the Major Leagues.

=== Team accomplishments ===
- On August 2, the Tigers scored at least one run in every inning of the game in an 11–5 win over the Colorado Rockies. They became the first team to accomplish this feat since the New York Yankees did so against the Toronto Blue Jays on April 29, 2006, and the first Tigers team to do so since 1912.
- On August 10, the Tigers were defeated by the Toronto Blue Jays 6–5 in a 19 inning game that took six hours and 37 minutes. It was the first 19 inning game for the Tigers since April 27, 1984. The game was the second longest Tigers game in duration since a 22-inning, seven-hour game on June 24, 1962. It tied for the fourth longest game innings-wise in franchise history.
- On August 24, the Tigers tied the franchise record for the most hits in a four-game series with 60 hits against the Minnesota Twins. The last time the Tigers had 60 hits in a four-game series was against the Chicago White Sox in 1956.
- The Tigers spent 162 calendar days atop of the American League Central, the most days in first place by any team in the majors during the 2014 season.
- On October 2, during Game 1 of the ALDS against the Baltimore Orioles, Víctor Martínez and J. D. Martinez hit back-to-back home runs in the second inning. During Game 2 of the ALDS, J. D. Martinez and Nick Castellanos hit back-to-back home runs in the fourth inning. The Tigers became the fourth team in postseason history to hit back-to-back home runs in consecutive postseason games, following the Tampa Bay Rays during the 2008 ALCS, the Florida Marlins during the 2003 NLCS, and the New York Yankees during the 1995 ALDS. Detroit is the first team in history to open the postseason with back-to-back home runs in consecutive games.

=== All-Stars ===
The Tigers sent three players to the 2014 All-Star Game. First baseman Miguel Cabrera was voted in as the starter at first base in the fan voting, while designated hitter Víctor Martínez and pitcher Max Scherzer were selected as reserves in the player voting. Martínez did not participate in the All-Star game due to right side soreness, so his teammate, second baseman Ian Kinsler, took his place on the American League roster. The Tigers had a chance to send a fourth player to the All-Star Game this season, as pitcher Rick Porcello was one of the five finalists for the AL in the All-Star Final Vote, but he was beaten out by Chris Sale of the Chicago White Sox.

Scherzer became the winning pitcher of the game, the first Tiger to do so since Jim Bunning in 1957, while Cabrera became the first Tiger to hit a home run in the All Star Game since Lou Whitaker did so in 1986.

== Standings ==
=== American League Central ===
AL Central
Team	W	L	Pct.	GB	Home	Road
Detroit Tigers	90	72	.556	—	45‍–‍36	45‍–‍36
Kansas City Royals	89	73	.549	1	42‍–‍39	47‍–‍34
Cleveland Indians	85	77	.525	5	48‍–‍33	37‍–‍44
Chicago White Sox	73	89	.451	17	40‍–‍41	33‍–‍48
Minnesota Twins	70	92	.432	20	35‍–‍46	35‍–‍46

== Game log ==
=== Regular season ===
Legend
Tigers win	Tigers loss	Game postponed

2014 Game Log (90–72)
March (1–0)

#	Date	Opponent	Score	Win	Loss	Save	Attendance	Record
1	March 31	Royals	W 4–3	Nathan (1–0)	Davis (0–1)	—	45,068	1–0

April (13–9)

#	Date	Opponent	Score	Win	Loss	Save	Attendance	Record
2	April 2	Royals	W 2–1 (10)	Alburquerque (1–0)	Collins (0–1)	—	26,906	2–0
—	April 3	Royals	Postponed (rain). Rescheduled to June 19.					
3	April 4	Orioles	W 10–4	Smyly (1–0)	González (0–1)	—	23,625	3–0
4	April 5	Orioles	W 7–6	Porcello (1–0)	Norris (0–1)	Nathan (1)	32,041	4–0
5	April 6	Orioles	L 1–3	Tillman (1–0)	Verlander (0–1)	Hunter (1)	34,261	4–1
6	April 8	@ Dodgers	L 2–3 (10)	Howell (1–0)	Chamberlain (0–1)	—	53,231	4–2
7	April 9	@ Dodgers	W 7–6 (10)	Nathan (2–0)	Jansen (0–1)	Alburquerque (1)	42,687	5–2
8	April 11	@ Padres	L 6–0	Cashner (1–1)	Porcello (1–1)	—	30,353	5–3
9	April 12	@ Padres	W 6–2	Verlander (1–1)	Kennedy (1–2)	—	42,182	6–3
10	April 13	@ Padres	L 5–1	Ross (1–2)	Scherzer (0–1)	—	32,267	6–4
—	April 15	Indians	Postponed (inclement weather). Rescheduled to July 19.					
11	April 16	Indians	L 3–2	McAllister (2–0)	Sánchez (0–1)	Axford (5)	23,811	6–5
12	April 17	Indians	W 7–5	Verlander (2–1)	Salazar (0–2)	Nathan (2)	25,990	7–5
13	April 18	Angels	L 6–11	Weaver (1–2)	Smyly (1–1)	—	28,435	7–6
14	April 19	Angels	W 5–2	Scherzer (1–1)	Wilson (2–2)	—	36,659	8–6
15	April 20	Angels	W 2–1	Porcello (2–1)	Santiago (0–3)	Nathan (3)	28,921	9–6
16	April 21	White Sox	L 1–3	Danks (2–0)	Sánchez (0–2)	Lindstrom (2)	24,997	9–7
17	April 22	White Sox	W 8–6	Verlander (3–1)	Leesman (0–1)	Chamberlain (1)	24,976	10–7
18	April 23	White Sox	L 4–6	Rienzo (1–0)	Reed (0–1)	Lindstrom (3)	23,451	10–8
19	April 24	White Sox	W 7–4	Scherzer (2–1)	Quintana (1–2)	Nathan (4)	28,514	11–8
20	April 25	@ Twins	W 10–6	Porcello (3–1)	Correia (0–3)	—	27,558	12–8
21	April 26	@ Twins	L 3–5	Hughes (2–1)	Ortega (0–1)	Perkins (6)	28,122	12–9
—	April 27	@ Twins	Postponed (rain). Rescheduled to August 23.					
22	April 29	@ White Sox	W 4–3	Chamberlain (1–1)	Belisario (1–3)	Nathan (5)	17,023	13–9
23	April 30	@ White Sox	W 5–1	Scherzer (3–1)	Noesí (0–2)	—	15,157	14–9

May (17–12)

#	Date	Opponent	Score	Win	Loss	Save	Attendance	Record
24	May 2	@ Royals	W 8–2	Porcello (4–1)	Shields (3–3)	—	28,021	15–9
25	May 3	@ Royals	W 9–2	Smyly (2–1)	Duffy (1–2)	—	29,200	16–9
26	May 4	@ Royals	W 9–4	Verlander (4–1)	Vargas (2–1)	—	22,504	17–9
27	May 5	Astros	W 2–0	Scherzer (4–1)	Cosart (1–3)	Nathan (6)	26,475	18–9
28	May 6	Astros	W 11–4	Ray (1–0)	Oberholtzer (0–6)	—	27,939	19–9
29	May 7	Astros	W 3–2	Porcello (5–1)	Peacock (0–3)	Nathan (7)	26,207	20–9
30	May 8	Astros	L 2–6	Keuchel (3–2)	Smyly (2–2)	—	35,643	20–10
31	May 9	Twins	L 1–2	Hughes (4–1)	Verlander (4–2)	Perkins (9)	35,814	20–11
32	May 10	Twins	W 9–3	Scherzer (5–1)	Gibson (3–3)	—	42,312	21–11
33	May 11	Twins	L 3–4	Burton (1–1)	Chamberlain (1–2)	Perkins (10)	40,468	21–12
34	May 12	@ Orioles	W 4–1	Porcello (6–1)	Norris (2–3)	Nathan (8)	24,517	22–12
35	May 13	@ Orioles	W 4–1	Miller (1–0)	Hunter (1–1)	Nathan (9)	29,950	23–12
36	May 14	@ Orioles	W 7–5	Verlander (5–2)	Gausman (0–1)	Nathan (10)	36,727	24–12
37	May 16	@ Red Sox	W 1–0	Scherzer (6–1)	Lester (4–5)	Nathan (11)	37,225	25–12
38	May 17	@ Red Sox	W 6–1	Porcello (7–1)	Lackey (5–3)	—	37,608	26–12
39	May 18	@ Red Sox	W 6–2	Sánchez (1–2)	Peavy (1–2)	—	35,006	27–12
40	May 19	@ Indians	L 4–5 (10)	Atchison (1–0)	Alburquerque (1–1)	—	12,709	27–13
41	May 20	@ Indians	L 2–6	Bauer (1–1)	Verlander (5–3)	—	13,924	27–14
42	May 21	@ Indians	L 10–11 (13)	Tomlin (3–1)	Coke (0–1)	—	19,228	27–15
43	May 22	Rangers	L 2–9	Darvish (4–2)	Ray (1–1)	—	40,768	27–16
44	May 23	Rangers	W 7–2	Sánchez (2–2)	Baker (0–1)	—	39,835	28–16
45	May 24	Rangers	L 2–12	Martinez (1–1)	Porcello (7–2)	—	43,447	28–17
46	May 25	Rangers	L 4–12	Lewis (4–3)	Verlander (5–4)	—	42,583	28–18
47	May 26	@ Athletics	L 0–10	Milone (3–3)	Smyly (2–3)	—	35,067	28–19
48	May 27	@ Athletics	W 6–5	Alburquerque (2–1)	Abad (0–2)	Nathan (12)	21,549	29–19
49	May 28	@ Athletics	L 1–3	Kazmir (6–2)	Nathan (2–1)	—	15,590	29–20
50	May 29	@ Athletics	W 5–4	Porcello (8–2)	Chavez (4–3)	Nathan (13)	21,860	30–20
51	May 30	@ Mariners	W 6–3	Verlander (6–4)	Iwakuma (3–2)	Chamberlain (2)	29,000	31–20
52	May 31	@ Mariners	L 2–3	Young (5–2)	Smyly (2–4)	Rodney (14)	37,142	31–21

June (14–13)

#	Date	Opponent	Score	Win	Loss	Save	Attendance	Record
53	June 1	@ Mariners	L 0–4	Elías (4–4)	Scherzer (6–2)	—	31,407	31–22
54	June 3	Blue Jays	L 3–5	McGowan (3–2)	Nathan (2–2)	Janssen (9)	33,488	31–23
55	June 4	Blue Jays	L 2–8	Dickey (6–4)	Porcello (8–3)	—	32,033	31–24
56	June 5	Blue Jays	L 3–7	Happ (5–2)	Verlander (6–5)	Janssen (10)	39,440	31–25
57	June 6	Red Sox	W 6–2	Smyly (3–4)	De La Rosa (1–1)	—	39,762	32–25
58	June 7	Red Sox	W 8–6	Scherzer (7–2)	Lester (6–7)	—	43,359	33–25
59	June 8	Red Sox	L 3–5	Lackey (7–4)	Chamberlain (1–3)	Uehara (12)	33,835	33–26
60	June 9	@ White Sox	L 5–6	Noesí (2–4)	Porcello (8–4)	Belisario (6)	18,803	33–27
—	June 10	@ White Sox	Postponed (rain). Rescheduled to August 30.					
61	June 11	@ White Sox	L 2–8	Danks (5–5)	Verlander (6–6)	—	18,424	33–28
62	June 12	@ White Sox	W 4–0	Scherzer (8–2)	Sale (5–1)	—	20,626	34–28
63	June 13	Twins	L 0–2	Gibson (6–5)	Smyly (3–5)	Perkins (17)	39,811	34–29
64	June 14	Twins	W 12–9	Sánchez (3–2)	Deduno (2–5)	Krol (1)	41,498	35–29
65	June 15	Twins	W 4–3	Nathan (3–2)	Fien (3–3)	—	41,462	36–29
66	June 16	Royals	L 8–11	Vargas (7–2)	Verlander (6–7)	—	31,774	36–30
67	June 17	Royals	L 4–11	Ventura (5–5)	Scherzer (8–3)	—	34,328	36–31
68	June 18	Royals	L 1–2	Guthrie (4–6)	Smyly (3–6)	Holland (21)	37,209	36–32
69	June 19	Royals	W 2–1	Sánchez (4–2)	Duffy (4–6)	Nathan (14)	35,715	37–32
70	June 20	@ Indians	W 6–4	Porcello (9–4)	Kluber (6–5)	Nathan (15)	33,545	38–32
71	June 21	@ Indians	W 5–4 (10)	Nathan (4–2)	Allen (3–2)	Coke (1)	40,712	39–32
72	June 22	@ Indians	W 10–4	Scherzer (9–3)	Tomlin (4–5)	—	26,023	40–32
73	June 24	@ Rangers	W 8–2	Smyly (4–6)	Lewis (5–5)	—	35,526	41–32
74	June 25	@ Rangers	W 8–6	Sánchez (5–2)	Saunders (0–4)	Nathan (16)	34,254	42–32
75	June 26	@ Rangers	W 6–0	Porcello (10–4)	Martinez (1–5)	—	34,989	43–32
76	June 27	@ Astros	L 3–4 (11)	Buchanan (1–1)	Hardy (0–1)	—	22,386	43–33
77	June 28	@ Astros	W 4–3	Coke (1–1)	Williams (1–4)	Nathan (17)	25,788	44–33
78	June 29	@ Astros	L 4–6	Feldman (4–4)	Smyly (4–7)	Sipp (1)	22,478	44–34
79	June 30	Athletics	W 5–4	Hardy (1–1)	Doolittle (1–3)	—	42,477	45–34

July (13–13)

#	Date	Opponent	Score	Win	Loss	Save	Attendance	Record
80	July 1	Athletics	W 3–0	Porcello (11–4)	Mills (1–1)	—	32,455	46–34
81	July 2	Athletics	W 9–3	Verlander (7–7)	Chavez (6–5)	—	35,445	47–34
82	July 3	Rays	W 8–1	Scherzer (10–3)	Bédard (4–6)	—	33,908	48–34
83	July 4	Rays	L 3–6	Cobb (4–6)	Smyly (4–8)	McGee (4)	40,657	48–35
84	July 5	Rays	L 2–7	Archer (5–5)	Sánchez (5–3)	—	38,087	48–36
85	July 6	Rays	L 3–7	Price (8–7)	Porcello (11–5)	McGee (5)	31,917	48–37
86	July 8	Dodgers	W 14–5	Verlander (8–7)	Ryu (9–5)	—	36,912	49–37
87	July 9	Dodgers	W 4–1	Scherzer (11–3)	Greinke (11–5)	Nathan (18)	36,462	50–37
88	July 10	@ Royals	W 16–4	Smyly (5–8)	Guthrie (5–8)	—	21,775	51–37
89	July 11	@ Royals	W 2–1	Sánchez (6–3)	Duffy (5–9)	Nathan (19)	31,581	52–37
90	July 12	@ Royals	W 5–1	Porcello (12–5)	Shields (9–5)	—	33,849	53–37
91	July 13	@ Royals	L 2–5	Ventura (7–7)	Verlander (8–8)	Holland (25)	23,424	53–38
92	July 18	Indians	L 3–9	Bauer (4–4)	Sánchez (6–4)	—	42,255	53–39
93	July 19	Indians	L 2–6	Kluber (10–6)	VerHagen (0–1)	—	38,109	53–40
94	July 19	Indians	L 2–5	Carrasco (3–3)	Nathan (4–3)	Allen (13)	42,044	53–41
95	July 20	Indians	W 5–1	Smyly (6–8)	Tomlin (5–7)	—	41,736	54–41
96	July 21	@ Diamondbacks	W 4–3	Verlander (9–8)	Delgado (1–2)	Nathan (20)	25,907	55–41
97	July 22	@ Diamondbacks	L 4–5	De La Rosa (2–0)	Coke (1–2)	Reed (24)	29,515	55–42
98	July 23	@ Diamondbacks	W 11–5	Sánchez (7–4)	Cahill (1–7)	—	24,174	56–42
99	July 24	@ Angels	W 6–4	Scherzer (12–3)	Richards (11–3)	Nathan (21)	40,146	57–42
100	July 25	@ Angels	L 1–2	Morin (3–3)	Smyly (6–9)	Street (2)	42,915	57–43
101	July 26	@ Angels	L 0–4	Shoemaker (8–3)	Verlander (9–9)	—	43,569	57–44
102	July 27	@ Angels	L 1–2	Smith (4–0)	Chamberlain (1–4)	Street (3)	36,252	57–45
103	July 29	White Sox	L 4–11	Quintana (6–7)	Sánchez (7–5)	—	40,032	57–46
104	July 30	White Sox	W 7–2	Scherzer (13–3)	Noesí (5–8)	—	37,193	58–46
105	July 31	White Sox	L 4–7	Belisario (4–7)	Soria (1–4)	Petricka (6)	41,306	58–47

August (16–15)

#	Date	Opponent	Score	Win	Loss	Save	Attendance	Record
106	August 1	Rockies	W 4–2	Verlander (10–9)	Morales (5–6)	Nathan (22)	39,052	59–47
107	August 2	Rockies	W 11–5	Porcello (13–5)	Matzek (2–6)		42,811	60–47
108	August 3	Rockies	W 4–0	Sánchez (8–5)	de la Rosa (11–7)	—	41,487	61–47
109	August 4	@ Yankees	L 1–2	McCarthy (4–0)	Scherzer (13–4)	Robertson (30)	41,603	61–48
110	August 5	@ Yankees	W 4–3 (12)	Soria (2–4)	Daley (0–1)	Nathan (23)	40,078	62–48
111	August 6	@ Yankees	L 1–5	Warren (2–5)	Verlander (10–10)	—	40,067	62–49
112	August 7	@ Yankees	L 0–1	Greene (3–1)	Porcello (13–6)	Robertson (31)	47,013	62–50
113	August 8	@ Blue Jays	W 5–4	Alburquerque (3–1)	Janssen (3–1)	Nathan (24)	36,237	63–50
114	August 9	@ Blue Jays	L 2–3 (10)	Loup (4–3)	Chamberlain (1–5)	—	45,927	63–51
115	August 10	@ Blue Jays	L 5–6 (19)	Jenkins (1–1)	Porcello (13–7)	—	46,126	63–52
116	August 11	@ Pirates	L 6–11	Locke (4–3)	Verlander (10–11)	—	35,314	63–53
117	August 12	@ Pirates	L 2–4	Volquez (10–7)	Ray (1–2)	Melancon (22)	34,919	63–54
118	August 13	Pirates	W 8–4	Hardy (2–1)	Worley (5–2)	—	41,043	64–54
119	August 14	Pirates	W 5–2	Scherzer (14–4)	Liriano (3–9)	—	41,986	65–54
120	August 15	Mariners	L 2–7	Paxton (3–0)	Porcello (13–8)	—	42,385	65–55
121	August 16	Mariners	W 4–2	Price (12–8)	Hernández (13–4)	Nathan (25)	43,833	66–55
122	August 17	Mariners	L 1–8	Young (12–6)	Ray (1–3)	—	41,181	66–56
123	August 19	@ Rays	W 8–6 (11)	Johnson (5–2)	Balfour (1–5)	Nathan (26)	14,331	67–56
124	August 20	@ Rays	W 6–0	Porcello (14–8)	Odorizzi (9–10)	—	13,575	68–56
125	August 21	@ Rays	L 0–1	Cobb (9–6)	Price (12–9)	McGee (14)	19,189	68–57
126	August 22	@ Twins	L 6–20	Pressly (2–0)	Ray (1–4)	—	29,394	68–58
127	August 23	@ Twins	L 4–12	Pino (2–5)	Farmer (0–1)	—	25,110	68–59
128	August 23	@ Twins	W 8–6	Verlander (11–11)	May (0–3)	Nathan (27)	25,578	69–59
129	August 24	@ Twins	W 13–4	Scherzer (15–4)	Gibson (11–10)	—	23,983	70–59
130	August 26	Yankees	W 5–2	Porcello (15–8)	McCarthy (5–3)	Nathan (28)	40,488	71–59
131	August 27	Yankees	L 4–8	Greene (4–1)	Price (12–10)	—	40,876	71–60
132	August 28	Yankees	W 3–2	Coke (2–2)	Kelley (2–5)	—	42,647	72–60
133	August 29	@ White Sox	W 7–1	Verlander (12–11)	Carroll (5–9)	—	17,071	73–60
134	August 30	@ White Sox	L 3–6	Sale (11–3)	Scherzer (15–5)	Petricka (10)	20,556	73–61
135	August 30	@ White Sox	W 8–4	Ryan (1–0)	Bassitt (0–1)	—	23,723	74–61
136	August 31	@ White Sox	L 2–6	Quintana (7–10)	Porcello (15–9)	—	26,336	74–62

September (16–10)

#	Date	Opponent	Score	Win	Loss	Save	Attendance	Record
137	September 1	@ Indians	W 12–1	Price (13–10)	Kluber (13–9)	—	23,296	75–62
138	September 2	@ Indians	W 4–2	Coke (3–2)	Allen (5–4)	Nathan (29)	9,990	76–62
139	September 3	@ Indians	L 0–7	Salazar (6–6)	Verlander (12–12)	—	11,739	76–63
140	September 4	@ Indians	W 11–4 (11)	Coke (4–2)	Tomlin (6–9)	—	11,935	77–63
141	September 5	Giants	L 2–8	Peavy (4–4)	Porcello (15–10)	—	31,940	77–64
142	September 6	Giants	L 4–5	Bumgarner (17–9)	Price (13–11)	Casilla (15)	35,722	77–65
143	September 7	Giants	W 6–1	Lobstein (1–0)	Hudson (9–10)	—	27,523	78–65
144	September 8	Royals	W 9–5	Verlander (13–12)	Guthrie (10–11)	—	30,758	79–65
145	September 9	Royals	W 4–2	Scherzer (16–5)	Vargas (11–8)	Nathan (30)	32,603	80–65
146	September 10	Royals	L 0–3	Shields (14–7)	Porcello (15–11)	Davis (3)	29,751	80–66
147	September 12	Indians	W 7–2	Price (14–11)	Carrasco (7–5)	—	38,341	81–66
148	September 13	Indians	W 5–4	Chamberlain (2–5)	Shaw (5–4)	Nathan (31)	41,190	82–66
149	September 14	Indians	W 6–4	Coke (5–2)	Shaw (5–5)	Nathan (32)	39,395	83–66
150	September 15	@ Twins	W 8–6	Ryan (2–0)	Fien (5–6)	Soria (18)	19,700	84–66
151	September 16	@ Twins	L 3–4	Perkins (4–3)	Nathan (4–4)	—	22,066	84–67
152	September 17	@ Twins	L 4–8	Gibson (12–11)	Price (14–12)	—	22,285	84–68
153	September 19	@ Royals	W 10–1	Verlander (14–12)	Vargas (11–10)	—	37,945	85–68
154	September 20	@ Royals	W 3–2	Scherzer (17–5)	Shields (14–8)	Nathan (33)	37,074	86–68
155	September 21	@ Royals	L 2–5	Guthrie (12–11)	Porcello (15–12)	Holland (43)	37,212	86–69
156	September 22	White Sox	L 0–2	Bassitt (1–1)	Lobstein (1–1)	Petricka (14)	30,758	86–70
157	September 23	White Sox	W 4–3	Nathan (5–4)	Petricka (1–6)	—	33,213	87–70
158	September 24	White Sox	W 6–1	Verlander (15–12)	Guerra (2–4)	—	36,810	88–70
159	September 25	Twins	W 4–2	Scherzer (18–5)	May (3–6)	Nathan (34)	33,077	89–70
160	September 26	Twins	L 4–11	Achter (1–0)	Porcello (15–13)	—	35,178	89–71
161	September 27	Twins	L 3–12	Nolasco (6–12)	Lobstein (1–2)	—	38,805	89–72
162	September 28	Twins	W 3–0	Price (15–12)	Gibson (13–12)	Nathan (35)	40,501	90–72

=== Postseason ===
==== American League Division Series ====
American League Division Series vs Baltimore Orioles (Orioles win series 3–0)

#	Date	Opponent	Score	Win	Loss	Save	Attendance	Record
1	October 2	@ Orioles	L 3–12	Tillman (1–0)	Scherzer (0–1)	—	47,842	0–1
2	October 3	@ Orioles	L 6–7	Brach (1–0)	Soria (0–1)	Britton (1)	48,058	0–2
3	October 5	Orioles	L 1–2	Norris (1–0)	Price (0–1)	Britton (2)	43,013	0–3

== Detailed records ==
American League
Opponent	Home	Away	Total	Pct.	Runs scored	Runs allowed
AL East
Toronto Blue Jays	0–3	1–2	1–5	.167	20	33
New York Yankees	2–1	1–3	3–4	.429	18	23
Baltimore Orioles	2–1	3–0	5–1	.833	33	20
Boston Red Sox	2–1	3–0	5–1	.833	30	16
Tampa Bay Rays	1–3	2–1	3–4	.429	30	28
	7–9	10–6	17–15	.531	131	120
AL Central
Detroit Tigers	–	–	–	–	–	–
Chicago White Sox	5–5	5–4	10–9	.526	85	80
Minnesota Twins	5–5	4–5	9–11	.450	102	119
Kansas City Royals	5–4	8–2	13–6	.684	100	66
Cleveland Indians	5–4	6–4	11–8	.579	103	80
	20–18	21–13	41–31	.569	388	340
AL West
Oakland Athletics	3–0	2–2	5–2	.714	29	29
Los Angeles Angels	2–1	1–3	3–4	.429	21	26
Texas Rangers	1–3	3–0	4–3	.571	41	43
Seattle Mariners	1–2	1–2	2–4	.333	15	27
Houston Astros	3–1	1–2	4–3	.571	29	25
	10–7	8–9	18–16	.529	135	150

National League
Opponent	Home	Away	Total	Pct.	Runs scored	Runs allowed
Los Angeles Dodgers	2–0	1–1	3–1	.750	27	15
San Diego Padres	0–0	1–2	1–2	.333	7	13
Arizona Diamondbacks	0–0	2–1	2–1	.667	19	12
Colorado Rockies	3–0	0–0	3–0	1.000	19	7
Pittsburgh Pirates	2–0	0–2	2–2	.500	21	21
San Francisco Giants	1–2	0–0	1–2	.333	12	14
	8–2	4–6	12–8	.600	105	83

=== Roster ===
2014 Detroit Tigers
Roster
Pitchers: 62 Al Alburquerque; 44 Joba Chamberlain; 40 Phil Coke; 45 Buck Farmer; 65 Blaine Hardy; 49 Jim Johnson; 49 Corey Knebel; 46 Ian Krol; 53 Kyle Lobstein; 63 Pat McCoy; 54 Melvin Mercedes; 60 Justin Miller; 36 Joe Nathan; 56 José Ortega; 21 Rick Porcello; 14 David Price; 39 Luke Putkonen; 58 Robbie Ray; 57 Evan Reed; 56 Kyle Ryan; 19 Aníbal Sánchez; 37 Max Scherzer; 55 Chad Smith; 33 Drew Smyly; 38 Joakim Soria; 64 Drew VerHagen; 35 Justin Verlander; 66 Kevin Whelan	Catchers: 13 Alex Avila; 50 Bryan Holaday; 34 James McCann; Infielders: 24 Miguel Cabrera; 9 Nick Castellanos; 28 Álex González; 32 Don Kelly; 3 Ian Kinsler; 41 Víctor Martínez; 26 Hernán Pérez; 27 Andrew Romine; 30 Eugenio Suárez; 29 Danny Worth; Outfielders: 61 Ezequiel Carrera; 18 Tyler Collins; 20 Rajai Davis; 48 Torii Hunter; 14 Austin Jackson; 28 J. D. Martinez; 33 Steven Moya	Manager: 7 Brad Ausmus; Coaches: 17 Mick Billmeyer (bullpen); 25 Dave Clark (third base); 59 Darnell Coles (assistant hitting); 51 Jeff Jones (pitching); 8 Wally Joyner (hitting); 22 Gene Lamont (bench); 31 Omar Vizquel (first base)

=== Player stats ===
==== Batting ====
Note: G = Games played; AB = At bats; R = Runs scored; H = Hits; 2B = Doubles; 3B = Triples; HR = Home runs; RBI = Runs batted in; AVG = Batting average; SB = Stolen bases

Player	G	AB	R	H	2B	3B	HR	RBI	AVG	SB
Alex Avila	124	390	44	85	22	0	11	47	.218	0
Miguel Cabrera	159	611	101	191	52	1	25	109	.313	1
Ezequiel Carrera	45	69	12	18	4	1	0	2	.261	7
Nick Castellanos	148	533	50	138	31	4	11	66	.259	2
Tyler Collins	18	24	3	6	0	0	1	4	.250	0
Rajai Davis	134	461	64	130	27	2	8	51	.282	36
Álex González	9	30	4	5	0	1	0	2	.167	0
Bryan Holaday	62	156	14	36	5	1	0	15	.231	1
Torii Hunter	142	549	71	157	33	2	17	83	.286	4
Austin Jackson+	100	374	52	102	25	5	4	33	.273	9
Don Kelly	95	163	24	40	5	1	0	7	.245	6
Ian Kinsler	161	684	100	188	40	4	17	92	.275	15
J. D. Martinez	123	441	57	139	30	3	23	76	.315	6
Víctor Martínez	151	561	87	188	33	0	32	103	.335	3
James McCann	9	12	2	3	1	0	0	0	.250	1
Steven Moya	11	8	2	3	0	0	0	0	.375	0
Hernán Pérez	8	5	1	1	0	0	0	0	.200	0
Andrew Romine	94	251	30	57	6	0	2	12	.227	12
Eugenio Suárez	85	244	33	59	9	1	4	23	.242	3
Danny Worth	20	42	5	7	1	0	0	5	.167	0
Pitcher totals	162	22	1	4	1	0	0	1	.182	0
Team totals	162	5630	757	1557	325	26	155	731	.277	106

+Totals with Tigers only.

==== Starters ====
Note: W = Wins; L = Losses; ERA = Earned run average; G = Games pitched; GS = Games started; SV = Saves; IP = Innings pitched; R = Runs allowed; ER = Earned runs allowed; BB = Walks allowed; K = Strikeouts

Player	W	L	ERA	G	GS	SV	IP	R	ER	BB	K
Kyle Lobstein	1	2	4.35	7	6	0	39 1/3	20	19	14	27
Rick Porcello	15	13	3.43	32	31	0	204 2/3	89	78	41	129
David Price+	4	4	3.59	11	11	0	77 2/3	32	31	15	82
Aníbal Sánchez	8	5	3.43	22	21	0	126	55	48	30	102
Max Scherzer	18	5	3.15	33	33	0	220 1/3	80	77	63	252
Drew Smyly+	6	9	3.93	21	18	0	105 1/3	48	46	31	89
Drew VerHagen	0	1	5.40	1	1	0	5	3	3	3	4
Justin Verlander	15	12	4.54	32	32	0	206	114	104	65	159

+Totals with Tigers only.

==== Bullpen ====
Note: W = Wins; L = Losses; ERA = Earned run average; G = Games pitched; GS = Games started; SV = Saves; IP = Innings pitched; R = Runs allowed; ER = Earned runs allowed; BB = Walks allowed; K = Strikeouts

Player	W	L	ERA	G	GS	SV	IP	R	ER	BB	K
Al Alburquerque	3	1	2.51	72	0	1	57 1/3	16	16	21	63
Joba Chamberlain	2	5	3.57	69	0	2	63	26	25	24	59
Phil Coke	5	2	3.88	62	0	1	58	28	25	20	41
Buck Farmer	0	1	11.57	4	2	0	9 1/3	12	12	5	11
Blaine Hardy	2	1	2.54	38	0	0	39	12	11	20	31
Jim Johnson	1	0	6.92	16	0	0	13	13	10	12	14
Corey Knebel+	0	0	6.23	8	0	0	8 2/3	7	6	3	11
Ian Krol	0	0	4.96	45	0	1	32 2/3	23	18	13	28
Pat McCoy	0	0	3.86	14	0	0	14	6	6	13	11
Melvin Mercedes	0	0	0.00	1	0	0	2	0	0	0	2
Justin Miller	1	0	5.11	8	0	0	12 1/3	9	7	2	5
Joe Nathan	5	4	4.81	62	0	35	58	32	31	29	54
José Ortega	0	1	27.00	1	0	0	1 1/3	4	4	4	1
Luke Putkonen	0	0	27.00	2	0	0	2 2/3	8	8	2	1
Robbie Ray	1	4	8.16	9	6	0	28 2/3	26	26	11	19
Evan Reed	0	1	4.18	32	0	0	32 1/3	19	15	12	26
Andrew Romine	0	0	27.00	1	0	0	1	3	3	0	1
Kyle Ryan	2	0	2.61	6	1	0	10 1/3	3	3	2	4
Chad Smith	0	0	5.40	10	0	0	11 2/3	7	7	3	9
Joakim Soria	1	1	4.91	13	0	1	11	7	6	2	6
Kevin Whelan	0	0	13.50	1	0	0	1 1/3	2	2	2	1
Danny Worth	0	0	4.50	2	0	0	2	1	1	0	2
Team Pitching Totals	90	72	4.01	162	162	41	1454	705	648	462	1244

+Totals with Tigers only.

== Farm system ==
Level	Team	League	Manager
AAA	Toledo Mud Hens	International League	Larry Parrish
AA	Erie SeaWolves	Eastern League	Lance Parrish
A	Lakeland Flying Tigers	Florida State League	Dave Huppert and Bill Dancy
A	West Michigan Whitecaps	Midwest League	Andrew Graham
A-Short Season	Connecticut Tigers	New York–Penn League	Mike Rabelo
Rookie	GCL Tigers	Gulf Coast League	Basilio Cabrera
