= Jim Johnson (baseball, born 1983) =

American baseball player (born 1983)

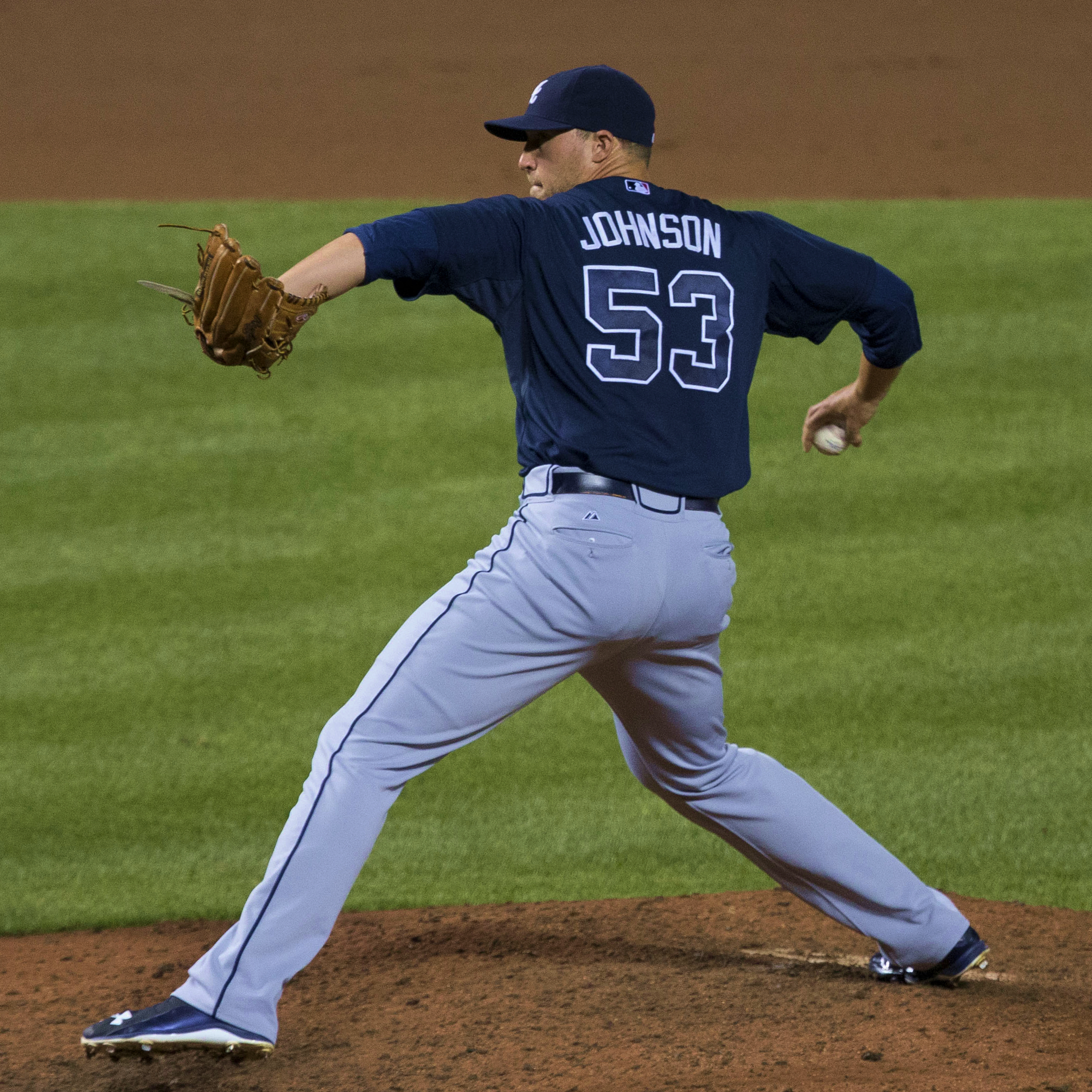
- Johnson with the Atlanta Braves in 2015
- Pitcher
- Born: June 27, 1983 (age 43); Johnson City, New York, U.S.
- Batted: Right Threw: Right

MLB debut
- July 29, 2006, for the Baltimore Orioles

Last MLB appearance
- September 29, 2018, for the Los Angeles Angels

MLB statistics
- Win–loss record: 38–46
- Earned run average: 3.79
- Strikeouts: 531
- Saves: 178
- Stats at Baseball Reference

Teams
- Baltimore Orioles (2006–2013); Oakland Athletics (2014); Detroit Tigers (2014); Atlanta Braves (2015); Los Angeles Dodgers (2015); Atlanta Braves (2016–2017); Los Angeles Angels (2018)

Career highlights and awards
- All-Star (2012); AL Rolaids Relief Man Award (2012); 2× MLB saves leader (2012, 2013)

James Robert Johnson (born June 27, 1983) is an American former professional baseball relief pitcher. He played in Major League Baseball (MLB) for the Baltimore Orioles, Oakland Athletics, Detroit Tigers, Atlanta Braves, Los Angeles Dodgers, and Los Angeles Angels. Johnson was an All-Star in 2012 and won the Rolaids Relief Man Award that year while leading MLB in saves. In 2013, Johnson became the first American League (AL) pitcher ever to have recorded back-to-back seasons of 50 saves or more. Johnson and Éric Gagné are the only two MLB pitchers to accomplish this feat.

== Early life ==
Johnson was born in Johnson City, New York. He was raised in Endicott, New York, and graduated from Union Endicott High School in 2001.

== Baseball career ==
=== Baltimore Orioles ===
The Baltimore Orioles drafted Johnson in the fifth round (143rd overall) of the 2001 MLB draft. He made his major league debut on July 29, 2006, against the Chicago White Sox, allowing eight earned runs in three innings for the loss. In 2007, he again only made one Major League appearance.

Johnson began the 2008 season in the Triple-A Norfolk Tides starting rotation, but was called up to the Orioles on April 12. Pitching middle and late relief, he ran up 18 consecutive scoreless innings before giving up a 10th inning run to Oakland on May 5. He became the interim closer when George Sherrill went on the disabled list on August 19, 2008. Johnson finished the season 2–4 with one save and a 2.23 ERA in 54 games.

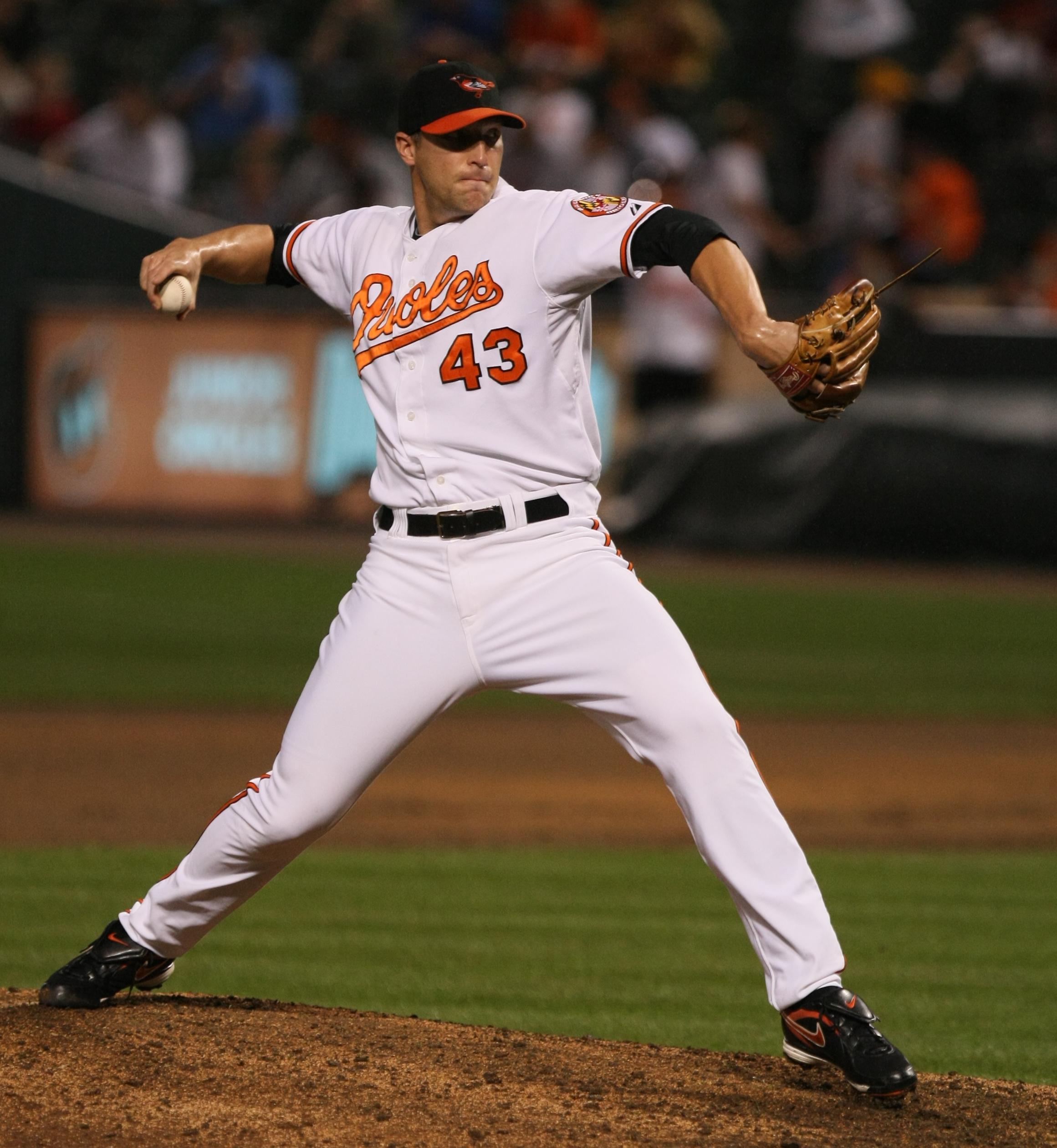
Johnson pitching for the Baltimore Orioles in 2009

Johnson was given the closer role on July 30, 2009, when Sherrill was traded to the Los Angeles Dodgers. He finished with 10 saves, but his ERA rose higher, finishing at 4.11 in 70 innings of relief. In the 2010 season, he returned to a setup role. Late in the 2011 season, Johnson won the closer role from Kevin Gregg.

On January 16, 2012, Johnson signed a one-year deal worth $2.625 million, avoiding arbitration. He won the Delivery Man of the Month Award for May 2012. On July 1, 2012, Johnson was one of three Orioles selected to play in the 2012 All Star Game. On September 21, 2012, Johnson set the Orioles' all-time single season save record at 46, passing Randy Myers. Johnson recorded his 50th save of the season on September 30 during a victory over the Boston Red Sox. With the win, Baltimore clinched a postseason berth, and Johnson became the 10th pitcher in MLB history to record 50 saves or more. He finished the season with 51 saves. He won the AL Rolaids Relief Man Award.

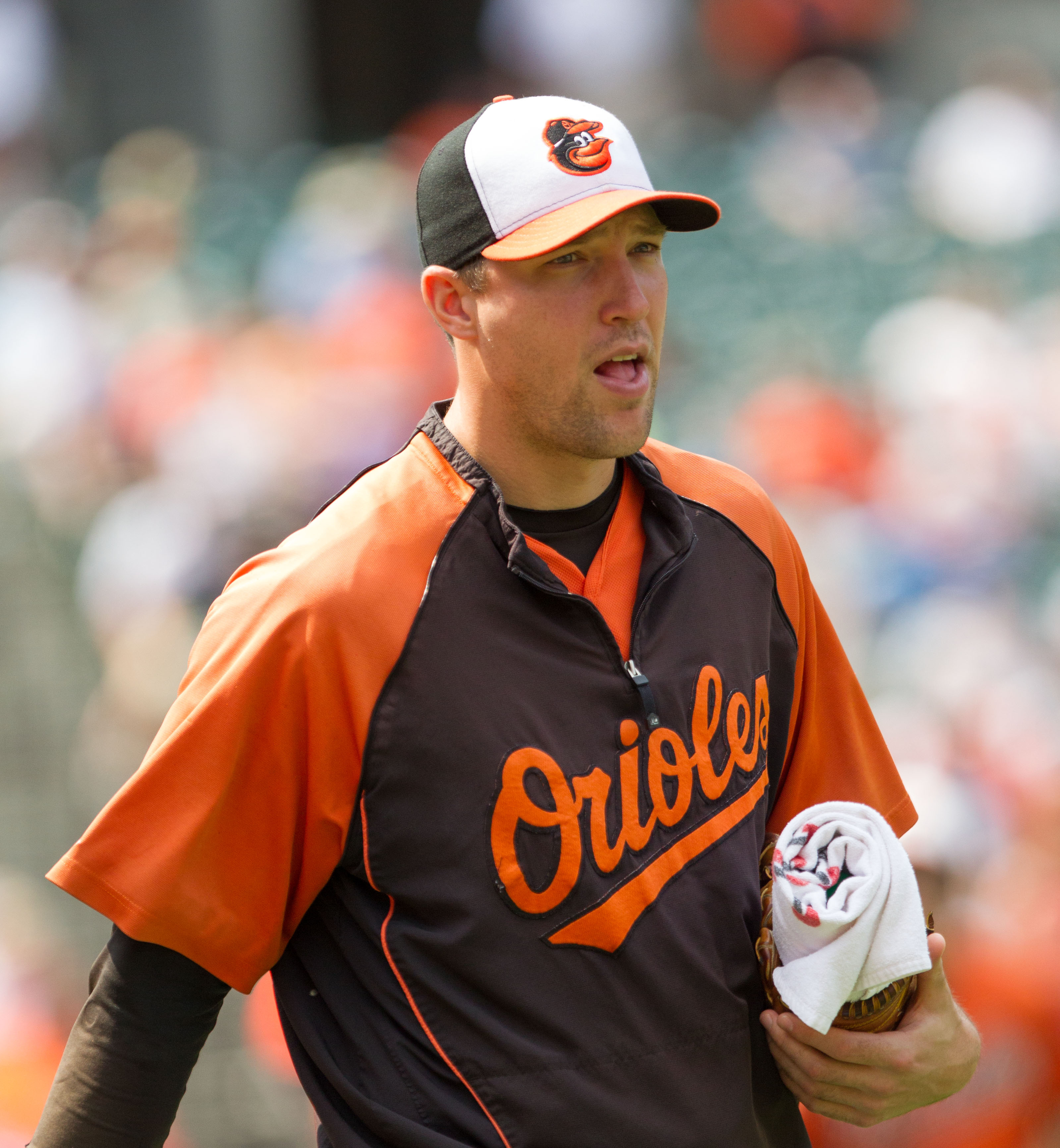
Johnson pitching for the Baltimore Orioles in 2012

Johnson had a mediocre postseason debut through four games in the 2012 American League Division Series against the New York Yankees. Johnson struggled in Game 1 of the series at Camden Yards, entering in the ninth inning of a 2–2 game and surrendering five runs (four earned) in only 1/3 of an inning. The Yankees won, 7–2. He gained redemption in Game 2, pitching a perfect ninth inning to preserve a 3–2 advantage, striking out Alex Rodriguez on a 3–2 count to end the game. Johnson pitched again in Game 3 in the Bronx and surrendered a game-tying home run to Raúl Ibañez with one out in the ninth inning. (Ibañez would also win the game on a homer in the 12th off of Brian Matusz.) Johnson earned a successful save in game four, working a scoreless 13th inning.

Johnson recorded his 100th career save against the New York Yankees on June 30, 2013.

=== Oakland Athletics ===
On December 2, 2013, Johnson was traded to the Oakland Athletics for infielder Jemile Weeks and a player to be named later, identified as David Freitas on December 12. The deal was considered to be a salary dump by the Orioles, since Johnson was projected to make $10.8 million in baseball arbitration, according to MLB Trade Rumors. His 2014 salary wound up being $10 million. Johnson's first season with the A's began poorly, as he earned a blown save and two losses in his first two appearances with the club. After five appearances and an ERA of 18.90, Johnson was pulled from the closer role on April 11, in favor of fellow relievers such as Luke Gregerson and Sean Doolittle. Johnson was designated for assignment on July 24, and released by the club on August 1. In 38 games with Oakland, he was 4–2 with two saves and a 7.14 ERA.

=== Detroit Tigers ===
On August 5, 2014, Johnson signed a minor-league contract with the Detroit Tigers. On August 16, the Tigers called up Johnson to the main roster. To make room on the 25-man roster, the Tigers optioned Melvin Mercedes back to Triple-A Toledo, and to make room on the 40-man roster, the Tigers designated Kevin Whelan for assignment. Johnson made his debut for the Tigers on August 17 against the Seattle Mariners, coming in to pitch the sixth inning and allowing two hits, three runs, one walk, and one strikeout in 2/3 innings. In 16 games with the Tigers, he was 1–0 with a 6.92 ERA.

=== Atlanta Braves ===
On December 3, 2014, Johnson signed a one–year contract worth $1.6 million with the Atlanta Braves. Johnson, who had been the set-up man for most of the year, was called on to be the closer after Jason Grilli was injured on July 11, two days before the All-Star break. In 49 games, he was 2–3 with nine saves and a 2.25 ERA.

=== Los Angeles Dodgers ===
On July 30, 2015, in a three-team trade, the Los Angeles Dodgers acquired Johnson, Mat Latos, Michael Morse, Bronson Arroyo, Alex Wood, Luis Avilán, and José Peraza, while the Miami Marlins acquired minor league pitchers Victor Araujo, Jeff Brigham, and Kevin Guzman, and the Braves received Héctor Olivera, Paco Rodriguez, minor league pitcher Zachary Bird and a competitive balance draft pick for the 2016 MLB draft. He struggled with the Dodgers, going 0–3 while allowing 22 runs in 18 2/3 innings (10.13 ERA). He did not make the postseason roster and the Dodgers designated him for assignment on October 14, 2015.

=== Atlanta Braves (second stint) ===
On November 30, 2015, Johnson signed a one-year, $2.5 million deal to return to the Braves. For the final week of July 2016, Johnson earned NL Player of the Week honors. He finished the 2016 season with a 2–6 record, 20 saves and 3.06 ERA, his lowest since 2013, in 65 games.

Johnson then signed a two-year extension on October 2, 2016. He struggled the following season with the Braves, going 6–5 with 22 saves and a 5.56 ERA. He also recorded nine blown saves.

=== Los Angeles Angels ===
On November 30, 2017, the Braves traded Johnson and $1.21 million in international bonus signing cash to the Los Angeles Angels in return for minor league pitcher Justin Kelly. In his first season with the Angels, Johnson appeared in 62 games, going 5–3 with two saves while registering an ERA of 3.84 in 63 1/3 innings. He elected free agency on October 29, 2018.

== Pitching style ==
Johnson throws four pitches, leading with a hard sinker averaging 95 miles per hour (153 km/h). His main off-speed pitch to right-handed hitters is a curveball averaging about 80 miles per hour (130 km/h). Against lefties, Johnson adds an upper-80s changeup. Lastly, he throws an occasional four-seam fastball in the mid 90s.
