= Danny Worth =

American baseball player (born 1985)

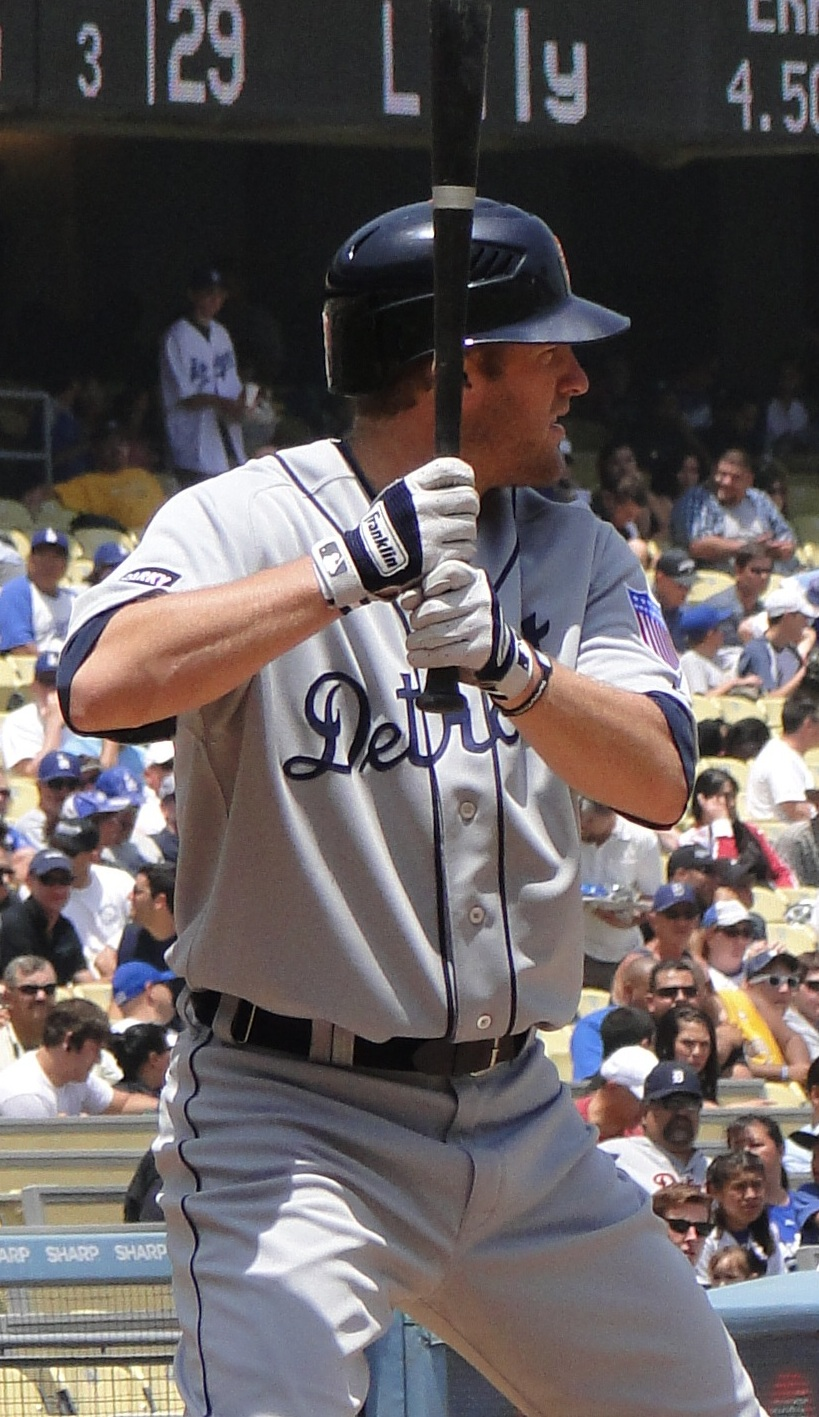
- Worth with the Detroit Tigers at Dodger Stadium
- Infielder
- Born: September 30, 1985 (age 40); Northridge, California, U.S.
- Batted: Right Threw: Right

Professional debut
- MLB: May 16, 2010, for the Detroit Tigers
- KBO: April 1, 2017, for the SK Wyverns

Last appearance
- MLB: July 24, 2016, for the Houston Astros
- KBO: April 4, 2017, for the SK Wyverns

MLB statistics
- Batting average: .223
- Home runs: 2
- Runs batted in: 20

KBO statistics
- Batting average: .111
- Home runs: 0
- Runs batted in: 0
- Stats at Baseball Reference

Teams
- Detroit Tigers (2010–2014); Houston Astros (2016); SK Wyverns (2017)

Daniel Weston Worth (born September 30, 1985) is an American baseball coach and former professional baseball infielder. He is an assistant baseball coach at Pepperdine University. He played in Major League Baseball (MLB) for the Detroit Tigers and the Houston Astros, and in the KBO League for the SK Wyverns.

Primarily a shortstop, Worth has also played second base and third base in the major and minor leagues.

== Early life ==
Worth was born in Northridge, California. He attended Valencia High School in Santa Clarita, California.

== Education ==
Worth attended Pepperdine University in Malibu, California, where he was a member of the baseball team from 2005-07. Worth was named a preseason All-American during his junior season and was also named an All-West Coast Conference selection all three of his seasons. He hit .320 for his career with seven home runs and 108 RBI. He was a member of two WCC-championship winning teams and played in three NCAA Tournaments.

== Playing career ==
=== Detroit Tigers ===
==== Minor leagues ====
Worth was drafted by the Detroit Tigers in the second round (91st overall) of the 2007 Major League Baseball draft. He played in the minor leagues for the Lakeland Flying Tigers (Single-A), the Erie SeaWolves (Double-A), and the Toledo Mud Hens (Triple-A). He was named the 8th best prospect in the Tigers system for the 2008 season by Baseball America. The same publication also listed him as the best defensive infielder.

==== Major leagues ====
Worth was called up on May 16, 2010. He appeared in his first Major League game that afternoon, replacing Scott Sizemore at second base when the Tigers sent Sizemore down to Triple-A. In his first major league at-bat Worth hit an infield single with the bases loaded and two outs, picking up his first major league hit and RBI. He was called up again on June 6 to replace Adam Everett in the lineup, who was designated for assignment on that date. Worth ultimately appeared in 39 games, mostly at shortstop.

Worth hit his first major league home run on July 7, 2010, against the Baltimore Orioles.

Worth entered the 2011 season as a candidate for playing time as a utility infielder. He ultimately appeared in 30 games at the major league level, often appearing as a defensive replacement at second or third base.

In 2012, Worth entered spring as a candidate for a utility infielder job, and made the opening day roster for the first time in his career. On April 13, he was optioned to the Toledo Mud Hens when Brandon Inge returned from the disabled list. Worth was recalled on April 28 when Delmon Young was placed on the restricted list.

Worth was the last player cut from the Tigers' roster at the end of spring training in 2013. He was optioned to the Mud Hens.

On December 13, 2013, the Tigers designated Worth for assignment after the signing of pitcher Joba Chamberlain. He cleared waivers on December 16 and was assigned to AAA Toledo. His contract was purchased by the Tigers on April 20, 2014 to replace Álex González, who was released.

On May 22, 2014, the Tigers were trailing the Texas Rangers 9–2 after eight innings when Worth entered the game as a pitcher for the first time in his career. Using mainly knuckleballs, Worth allowed one hit and struck out two to retire the side in the top of the ninth inning. He became the first Tiger position player to pitch a full inning since Mark Koenig in 1931.

Worth was designated for assignment by the Tigers on June 4, allowing the Tigers to bring up Eugenio Suárez from Triple-A Toledo. He cleared waivers and was sent to Triple-A Toledo on June 6. Worth elected free agency on October 12, 2014.

=== Arizona Diamondbacks ===
On December 15, 2014, he signed a minor league contract with the Arizona Diamondbacks.

=== Houston Astros ===
He joined the Houston Astros for the 2016 season, signing a minor league contract on January 26.

=== SK Wyverns ===
On November 16, 2016, Worth signed with the SK Wyverns of the KBO League in South Korea. He was released by the Wyverns after going 1-for-9 in 3 games.

== Coaching career ==
In July 2018, Worth became an assistant coach at Pepperdine University.

On January 21, 2025, Worth was announced as an infield coordinator within the player development department of the San Diego Padres.
