= José Ortega (baseball) =

Venezuelan baseball player (born 1988)

- Pitcher
- Born: October 12, 1988 (age 37); Caja Seca, Venezuela
- Batted: Right Threw: Right

MLB debut
- June 8, 2012, for the Detroit Tigers

Last MLB appearance
- April 26, 2014, for the Detroit Tigers

MLB statistics
- Win–loss record: 0–3
- Earned run average: 5.74
- Strikeouts: 15
- Stats at Baseball Reference

Teams
- Detroit Tigers (2012–2014)

José Antonio (Chourio) Ortega (born October 12, 1988) is a Venezuelan former professional baseball pitcher. He played in Major League Baseball (MLB) for the Detroit Tigers from 2012 to 2014.

== Career ==
=== Detroit Tigers ===
==== Minor leagues (2006–2011) ====
On July 3, 2006, Ortega signed with the Detroit Tigers as an international free agent. He spent his first two professional seasons with the Venezuelan Summer League Tigers. In 2009, Ortega made 25 appearances for the Low-A Oneonta Tigers, compiling a 2-2 record and 3.97 ERA with 32 strikeouts and one save over 34 innings of work.

Ortega split the 2010 season between the Single-A West Michigan Whitecaps, High-A Lakeland Flying Tigers, and Double-A Erie SeaWolves. In 43 appearances (one start) for the three affiliates, he accumulated a 3-4 record and 3.03 ERA with 61 strikeouts and one save across 68 1/3 innings pitched. Ortega spent the 2011 campaign with the Triple-A Toledo Mud Hens, but struggled to a 1-3 record and 6.30 ERA with 44 strikeouts in 50 innings pitched across 33 relief outings.

==== 2012: Debut with Tigers ====
Ortega was called up to the Major Leagues by the Detroit Tigers in June 2012. He made his Major League debut on June 8, 2012 against the Cincinnati Reds giving up two hits in 1/3 innings pitched. After the game, Ortega was sent back down to minor league Triple-A Toledo Mud Hens.

==== 2013 ====
Ortega started the 2013 season with the Mud Hens where he went 1–0 with a 0.00 ERA in 14 innings pitched before being called up by the Tigers on April 29.

==== 2014 ====
Ortega was called up again on April 26, 2014 to add a fresh arm after the bullpen was heavily used that week. He had to be used right away when starter Aníbal Sánchez came out of the game in the 3rd inning. Ortega gave up four runs over 1 1/3 innings without giving up a hit, while allowing five walks. He was optioned back to the Mud Hens on May 6 to make room for Robbie Ray. On August 29, Ortega was designated for assignment by the Detroit following the promotion of Evan Reed. He cleared waivers and was sent outright to Toledo on August 31. From June 19 until the end of the campaign, Ortega had a 4.78 ERA and a .406 OBP against with the Mud Hens.

=== Colorado Rockies ===
Ortega signed a minor league contract with the Colorado Rockies on November 22, 2014. He made 45 relief appearances for the Double-A New Britain Rock Cats in 2015, compiling an 0-1 record and 4.19 ERA with 40 strikeouts and one save across 53 2/3 innings pitched.

=== Vaqueros Laguna ===
On April 1, 2016, Ortega signed with the Vaqueros Laguna of the Mexican League. He made five appearances for Laguna, but struggled to a 12.46 ERA with three strikeouts across 4 1/3 innings pitched. Ortega was released by the Vaqueros on April 10.

=== Sioux Falls Canaries ===
On April 20, 2017, Ortega signed with the Sioux Falls Canaries of the American Association of Independent Professional Baseball. He made 45 appearances (one start) for Sioux Falls, posting a 4-8 record and 4.82 ERA with 44 strikeouts and 17 saves across 46 2/3 innings pitched.

=== Sugar Land Skeeters ===
On January 9, 2018, Ortega was traded to the Sugar Land Skeeters of the Atlantic League of Professional Baseball. He made three appearances for the Skeeters, recording a 3.00 ERA with three strikeouts over three innings of work. Ortega was released by Sugar Land on May 7.

=== Road Warriors ===
On May 9, 2018, Ortega signed with the Road Warriors of the Atlantic League of Professional Baseball. He made 47 appearances for the team, registering an 0-2 record and 4.47 ERA with 49 strikeouts and two saves over 50 1/3 innings of work. Ortega became a free agent following the season.

=== York Revolution ===
On February 26, 2019, Ortega signed with the York Revolution of the Atlantic League of Professional Baseball. He made four appearances for York, but struggled to a 15.00 ERA with two strikeouts over three innings of work. Ortega was released by the Revolution on May 6.

=== Lincoln Saltdogs ===
On June 4, 2019, Ortega signed with the Lincoln Saltdogs of the American Association. In five appearances for Lincoln, he struggled to a 9.00 ERA with seven strikeouts and three saves across four innings pitched. Ortega was released by the Saltdogs on June 18.
