= Pat McCoy (baseball) =

American baseball player (born 1988)

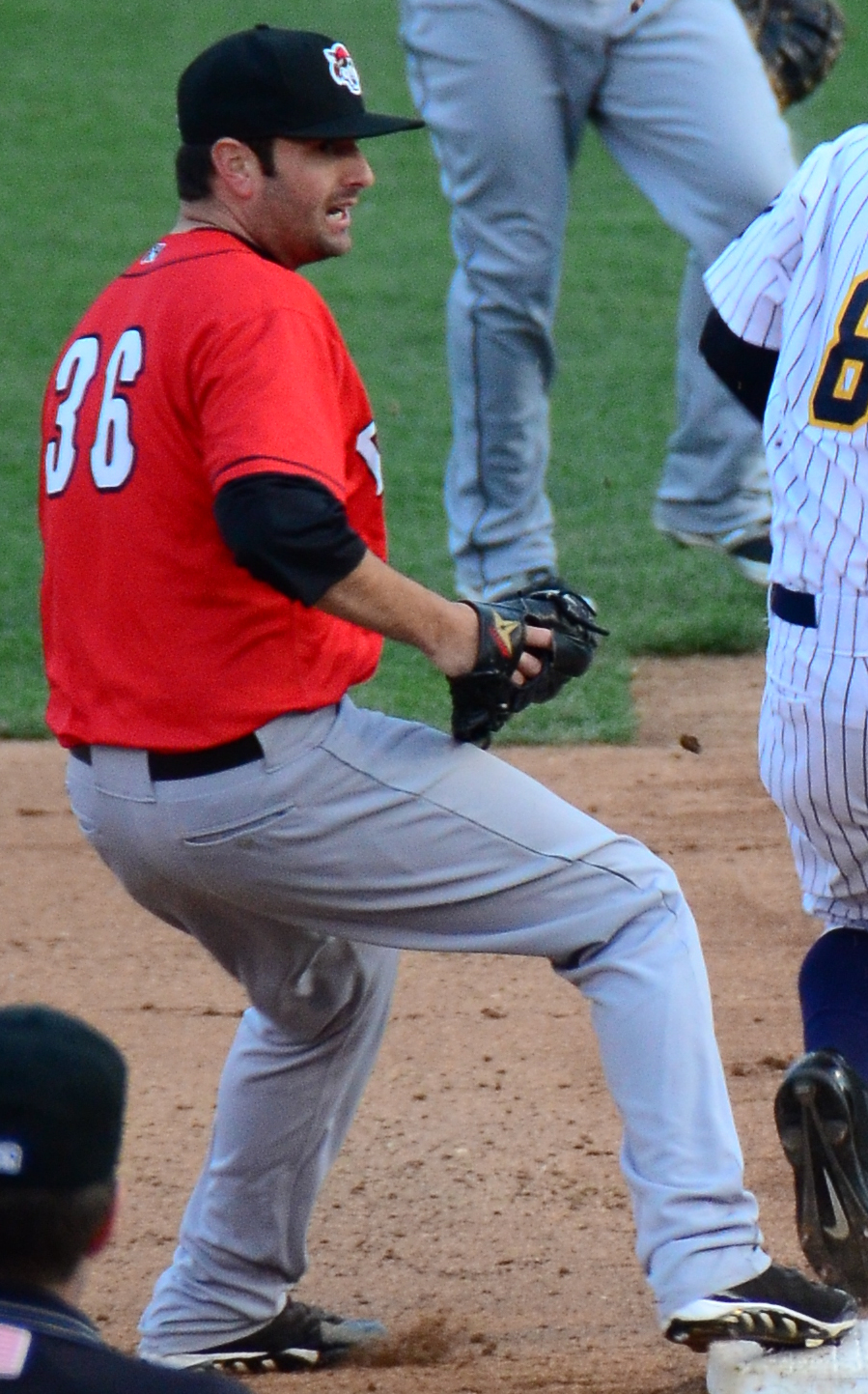
- McCoy with the Erie SeaWolves in 2014
- Pitcher
- Born: August 3, 1988 (age 37); Tucson, Arizona, U.S.
- Batted: Left Threw: Left

MLB debut
- June 22, 2014, for the Detroit Tigers

Last MLB appearance
- September 5, 2014, for the Detroit Tigers

MLB statistics
- Win–loss record: 0–0
- Earned run average: 3.86
- Strikeouts: 11
- Stats at Baseball Reference

Teams
- Detroit Tigers (2014)

Patrick James McCoy (born August 3, 1988) is an American former professional baseball pitcher. He played in Major League Baseball (MLB) for the Detroit Tigers.

== Early life ==
McCoy attended Sahuaro High School in Tucson, Arizona, where he posted a 7–3 record, with a 2.71 ERA, striking out 89 in 62 innings in his junior year. During his senior year, he posted a 2–0 record, with a 0.64 ERA, striking out 24 in 11 innings.

McCoy was a member of team Arizona at the 2006 Junior Sunbelt, where they finished the tournament in 6th place, with a 5–5 record. McCoy was a member of team Arizona at the 2007 Senior Sunbelt, where they finished the tournament in 3rd place, with a 7–3 record.

== Professional career ==
=== Washington Nationals ===
McCoy was drafted by the Washington Nationals in the 10th round of the 2007 Major League Baseball draft. McCoy played in the Nationals minor league system until 2013. McCoy reached the Triple-A level for the first time in 2013, appearing in seven games for the Syracuse Chiefs. McCoy spent most of the year with the Double–A Harrisburg Senators where he posted a 2–1 record, with a 4.32 ERA, and striking out 36 in 41 2/3 innings. From the end of June 30 to July 19, he had a streak of seven-consecutive scoreless relief appearance for the Senators. During McCoy's seven years with the Nationals' organization he accumulated 16 wins, 311 strikeouts, and a 4.67 ERA in 224 games.

=== Detroit Tigers ===
McCoy signed a minor league contract with the Detroit Tigers in December 2013. On June 21, 2014, the Tigers purchased McCoy's contract from the Triple-A Toledo Mud Hens, adding him to their active roster. McCoy made his major league debut the next day in a game against the Cleveland Indians. Before being called up, McCoy posted a 3–0 record, with a 2.94 ERA and a .246 batting average against between the Double-A Erie SeaWolves and Triple-A Toledo. The Tigers called up McCoy again on August 23, before a doubleheader with the Minnesota Twins.

=== Baltimore Orioles ===
On October 31, 2014, McCoy was claimed off waivers by the Baltimore Orioles. He was removed from the 40–man roster and sent outright to the Triple–A Norfolk Tides on December 8. McCoy made 41 appearances split between the Triple–A Norfolk Tides and Double–A Bowie Baysox in 2015, compiling a 4–4 record and 4.02 ERA with 51 strikeouts across 69 1/3 innings pitched.

=== Toronto Blue Jays ===
McCoy signed a minor league contract with the Toronto Blue Jays on December 18, 2015, that included an invitation to spring training.

=== Colorado Rockies ===
On June 19, 2016, McCoy was traded to the Colorado Rockies and assigned to the Triple-A Albuquerque Isotopes. He made 22 appearances out of the bullpen for the Triple–A Albuquerque Isotopes, struggling to a 6.35 ERA with 19 strikeouts across 22 2/3 innings pitched. McCoy elected free agency following the season on November 7.

=== Southern Maryland Blue Crabs ===
On February 17, 2017, McCoy signed a minor league contract with the Cleveland Indians organization. He was released prior to the start of the season on April 4.

On May 12, 2017, McCoy signed with the Southern Maryland Blue Crabs of the Atlantic League of Professional Baseball. In 11 starts for the team, he logged a 2–5 record and 4.76 ERA with 38 strikeouts across 62 1/3 innings pitched. McCoy was released on July 20.

=== Generales de Durango ===
On March 7, 2018, McCoy signed with the Generales de Durango of the Mexican League. In 15 games for the Generales, he struggled to a 6.08 ERA with 7 strikeouts over 13 1/3 innings pitched. McCoy was released by Durango on May 4.

=== York Revolution ===
On May 18, 2018, McCoy signed with the York Revolution of the Atlantic League of Professional Baseball. He was released on July 13.

=== Sugar Land Skeeters ===
On July 16, 2018, McCoy signed with the Sugar Land Skeeters of the Atlantic League of Professional Baseball. McCoy announced his retirement from professional baseball on August 2.
