= Chad Smith (baseball, born 1989) =

American baseball player (born 1989)

- Pitcher
- Born: October 2, 1989 (age 36); Thousand Oaks, California, U.S.
- Batted: Left Threw: Right

MLB debut
- June 22, 2014, for the Detroit Tigers

Last MLB appearance
- May 6, 2015, for the Oakland Athletics

MLB statistics
- Win–loss record: 0–0
- Earned run average: 8.31
- Strikeouts: 11
- Stats at Baseball Reference

Teams
- Detroit Tigers (2014); Oakland Athletics (2015)

Chad Dennis Smith (born October 2, 1989) is an American former professional baseball pitcher. He previously played Major League Baseball (MLB) for the Detroit Tigers and Oakland Athletics.

== Early life ==
Smith attended Thousand Oaks High School, in Thousand Oaks, California, where he had an 8–1 win–loss record with a 2.00 earned run average (ERA), striking out 65 batters in 60 innings pitched, earning Los Angeles Daily News, Ventura County Star, and All-Marmonte League first team honors his senior year. Smith was a member of the Marmonte League champions in his junior and senior seasons.

During the summer of 2008, he pitched for the Wenatchee AppleSox of the West Coast League, where he was 1–2 with a 3.96 ERA in 13 games.

== College career ==
Smith was undrafted out of high school and went on to attend the University of Southern California (USC). Playing college baseball for the USC Trojans baseball team, he made his collegiate debut on February 25, 2009, against the Pepperdine Waves. In his freshman season, he made four starts, and went 3–4 in 18 appearances with one save and a 3.40 ERA, striking out 38 in 45 innings. In his sophomore season, he made six starts, and went 5–6 in 23 appearances, with two saves and a 4.47 ERA, striking out 58 in 56.1 innings. Despite the high ERA, opponents only hit .237 off him in 2010. After the 2010 season, he played collegiate summer baseball with the Brewster Whitecaps of the Cape Cod Baseball League. His junior season got off to a good start, where he was 1–2 with four saves and a 2.66 ERA in 19 appearances, but on April 17, he tore his ulnar collateral ligament in his elbow, and was out for the remainder of the season after having Tommy John surgery.

=== Summer baseball ===
Smith pitched for the Peninsula Oilers of the Alaska Baseball League in 2009 and 2010. In 2009, he made six starts, and went 2–3 in 11 appearances, with a 1.95 ERA and one save, striking out 31 in 37 innings. In 2010, he went 1–1 in 11 appearances, with a 0.46 ERA and three saves, striking out 22 in 19.2 innings.

== Professional career ==
=== Detroit Tigers ===
Smith was drafted by the Detroit Tigers in the 17th round of the 2011 Major League Baseball draft. Smith did not pitch professionally in 2011, as he was recovering from Tommy John surgery.

Smith made his professional debut with the GCL Tigers in June 2012. He made four appearances before being promoted to Short-Season Connecticut. He made two appearances in Connecticut before being promoted to Single-A West Michigan, where he made eight appearances to finish the year. In 14 games in 2012, Smith was 1–2 with a 2.76 ERA, striking out 48 in 45.2 innings. Smith pitched all of 2013 in West Michigan's bullpen, where he was 5–4 in 43 appearances, with a 2.12 ERA, striking out 73 in 72 innings.

Smith made his 2014 debut with Double-A Erie, where he made seven appearances before being promoted to Triple-A Toledo on April 28. Between Double-A Erie and Triple-A Toledo, Smith posted a 5–2 record, 1.80 ERA and .220 batting average allowed.

On June 18, 2014, Smith was called up by the Detroit Tigers. Evan Reed was designated for assignment to make room on the roster. Smith made his major league debut on June 22, in a game against the Cleveland Indians. On February 24, 2015, Smith was designated for assignment by the Tigers.

=== Oakland Athletics ===
Smith was claimed off waivers by the Oakland Athletics two days later. He was promoted to the major leagues in May and was designated for assignment after two appearances.

=== Los Angeles Angels of Anaheim ===
The Athletics traded Smith to the Los Angeles Angels of Anaheim for cash considerations on May 8, 2015. Smith was released by the Angels on June 6.

=== Texas Rangers ===
Smith signed a minor league contract with the Texas Rangers on August 19, 2015.

Smith re-signed with the Rangers on a new a minor league contract in December 2015. He was released on June 6, 2016.
