= Joba Chamberlain =

American baseball player (born 1985)

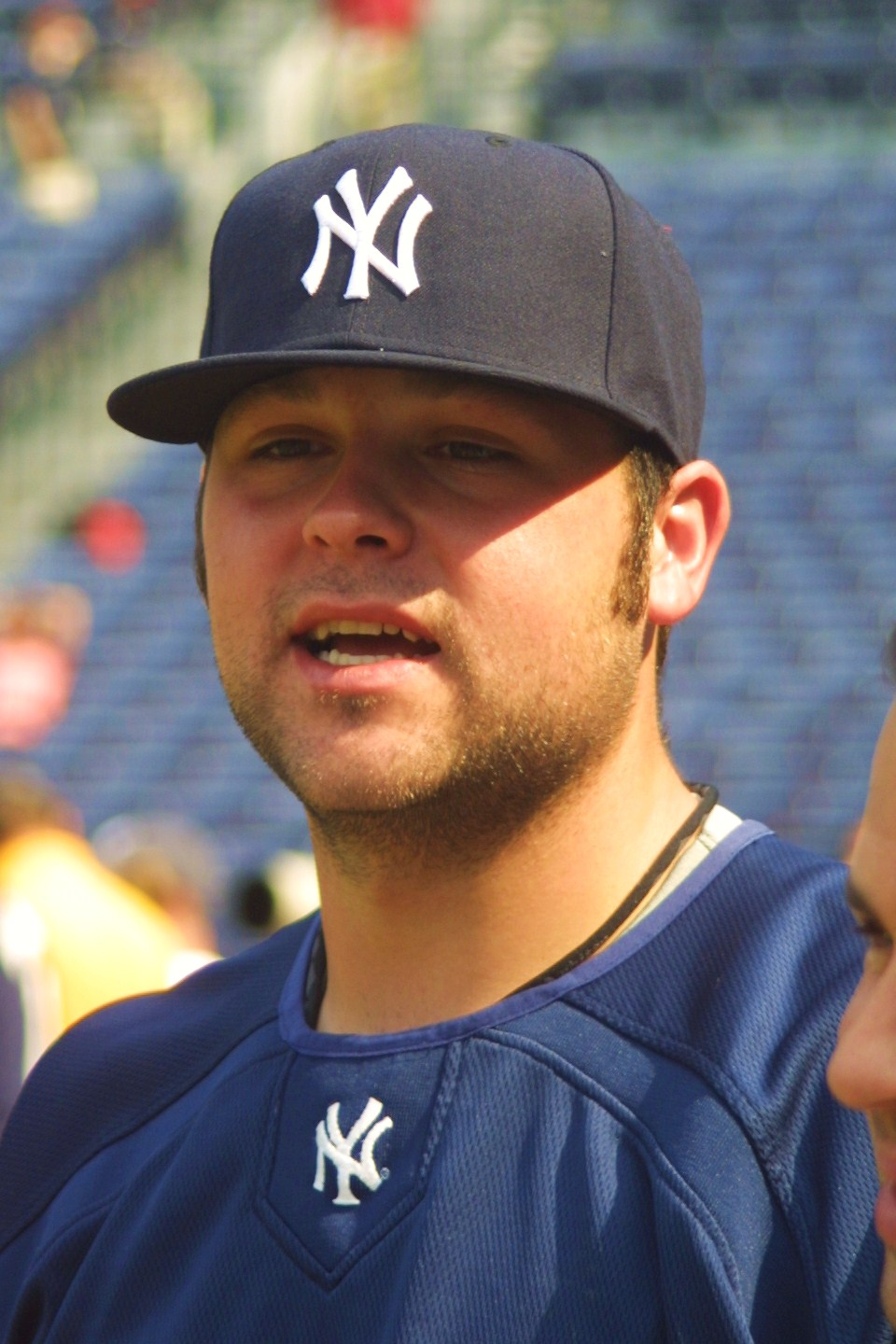
- Chamberlain with the New York Yankees in 2009
- Pitcher
- Born: September 23, 1985 (age 41); Lincoln, Nebraska, U.S.
- Batted: Right Threw: Right

MLB debut
- August 7, 2007, for the New York Yankees

Last MLB appearance
- July 3, 2016, for the Cleveland Indians

MLB statistics
- Win–loss record: 25–21
- Earned run average: 3.81
- Strikeouts: 546
- Stats at Baseball Reference

Teams
- New York Yankees (2007–2013); Detroit Tigers (2014–2015); Kansas City Royals (2015); Cleveland Indians (2016)

Career highlights and awards
- World Series champion (2009)

Justin Louis "Joba" Chamberlain (/ˈdʒɒbə/ JOB-ə; né Heath; born September 23, 1985) is an American former professional baseball pitcher. He played in Major League Baseball (MLB) for the New York Yankees, Detroit Tigers, Kansas City Royals, and Cleveland Indians.

Chamberlain played college baseball for the Nebraska Cornhuskers before the Yankees selected him in the first round of the 2006 MLB draft. He ascended through the minor leagues and made his MLB debut in 2007 as a relief pitcher during the Yankees' pursuit of a berth in the MLB postseason. The Yankees adhered to what became known as the "Joba Rules", where they carefully monitored and limited his appearances. During the 2008 season, the Yankees transitioned Chamberlain to the starting rotation, and he suffered a shoulder injury later in the season. Chamberlain struggled as a starter in 2009, and was shifted back to a relief role. He signed as a free agent with the Tigers before the 2014 season, and re-signed with the Tigers for 2015, but was released during the season. He returned to MLB later in 2015 with Kansas City and pitched for Cleveland in 2016.

== Early life ==
Chamberlain was born Justin Louis Heath on September 23, 1985. He grew up in Lincoln, Nebraska. Chamberlain's parents, Harlan Chamberlain and Jackie Standley, were never married and split up when Joba was 18 months old. Some sources say that Harlan Chamberlain obtained full custody of Joba when he was three years old, but Standley claims that Joba lived with her most of the time until he was 10 when she had his surname legally changed from Heath, her maiden name, to Chamberlain. Standley began abusing drugs when Joba was 4 or 5 and says that she and Joba speak to each other only rarely.

Chamberlain's father was born on the Winnebago Indian Reservation, but had to leave to be treated for polio. Chamberlain still has family living on Native American reservations. As of 2014, he was one of only three active non-Hispanic Native American players in Major League Baseball, with the others being Kyle Lohse of the Milwaukee Brewers and Jacoby Ellsbury of the New York Yankees.

When Chamberlain was a little boy, his two-year-old cousin was unable to pronounce her brother (Chamberlain's other cousin) Joshua's name correctly, pronouncing it as Joba instead, which became Chamberlain's nickname over time.

Chamberlain served as a ball boy and bat boy for Lincoln Northeast High School's state championship baseball team, and eventually graduated from Northeast. He did not jump straight to college; to help pay the bills, Joba briefly worked for the city of Lincoln's maintenance department.

== Amateur baseball career ==
=== High school ===
At Lincoln Northeast High School, he garnered second-team Super State honors from the Lincoln Journal Star, going 3–2 with a 3.35 ERA, as he struck out 29 in 31.1 innings as a senior.

He played American Legion Baseball over the summer of 2004, going 4–4 with a 1.36 earned run average (ERA), 137 strikeouts, and 21 walks en route to all-state honors. He recorded 21 strikeouts over 12 shutout innings in a matchup against future fellow Nebraska star Johnny Dorn's team, a 15-inning game won by Grand Island, 1–0. Chamberlain also hit .505 with 11 homers, 11 doubles and 37 RBI.

=== College ===
Chamberlain started his college career playing for the University of Nebraska at Kearney Lopers under coach Damon Day, leading the team in ERA (5.23), opponents' batting average (.250), strikeouts (49), and complete games (4) in just eight starts as a freshman. He was named a 2004 honorable mention All-Rocky Mountain Athletic Conference.

He transferred to the University of Nebraska–Lincoln for his sophomore season, undergoing knee surgery and losing 25 pounds. Chamberlain helped the Cornhuskers reach the 2005 College World Series and their first College World Series win. That year, he finished with a 10–2 record, 2.81 ERA, and 130 strikeouts, including five double-digit strikeout games, over 118.2 innings. In 2005, he was named a first-team All-Big 12 pick and was also the league’s newcomer of the year.

During the 2004–2005 college off-season Chamberlain pitched for the Nebraska Bruins of the National Baseball Congress. He started six games in 2005, recording a 5–0 record and a 1.59 ERA.

Triceps tendinitis limited his 2006 season but he still pitched in 14 games, posting a 6–5 record with a 3.93 ERA and 102 strikeouts in 89.1 innings. A two-time Big 12 Pitcher of the Week, Chamberlain finished third with 102 strikeouts and averaged 10.28 strikeouts per nine innings.

== Professional baseball career ==
=== New York Yankees ===
==== 2006–2009 ====
Chamberlain was drafted 41st overall by the New York Yankees in the 2006 Major League Baseball draft as a supplemental pick as free agent compensation for Tom Gordon, who signed with the Philadelphia Phillies. Chamberlain didn't pitch in the minors during the 2006 season, but made his professional debut in the Hawaii Winter Baseball league, posting a 2.63 ERA in nine games for the West Oahu CaneFires.

Before the 2007 season, Baseball America ranked Chamberlain as the fifth-best prospect in the pitching-rich Yankees organization and the 75th-best prospect in Major League Baseball. His fastball was also ranked as the best in the Yankees farm system. Baseball Prospectus ranked him 56th overall.

He started the 2007 season in Single-A Advanced, playing for the Tampa Yankees in the Florida State League. He went 4–0 with a 2.03 ERA in seven starts, and had 51 strikeouts and 11 walks. He was then promoted to the Double-A Trenton Thunder in the Eastern League, where he was 4–2 in seven games with a 3.43 ERA and 64 strikeouts. He was named to the U.S. Team in the 2007 All-Star Futures Game at AT&T Park. Chamberlain pitched the third inning, striking out one, walking one, and allowing a hit and an earned run.

On July 24, 2007, Chamberlain was promoted to Triple-A Scranton/Wilkes-Barre. He made his first start the next day, striking out 10 in five innings and earning his first Triple-A victory. While the Yankees still saw him as a starter in the future, the team announced that Chamberlain would be moved to the Scranton bullpen. He made his first appearance the next day, striking out the side in one inning pitched and hitting 100 on the radar gun three times. On August 1, Chamberlain went back to Trenton to make a relief appearance, striking out two batters in a 1–2–3 eighth inning. He then came back to Scranton, pitching two innings and striking out five batters.

On August 7, 2007, the Yankees purchased Chamberlain's contract, elevating him to the major leagues for the first time in his career. In his debut that day, Chamberlain struck out the first batter he faced and went on to pitch two scoreless innings, striking out two in a win over the Toronto Blue Jays. Chamberlain's usage in games was initially restricted by what were referred to as the "Joba Rules", which prevented him from pitching on consecutive days and gave him an additional day of rest for each inning pitched in an outing. On August 30, 2007, during a game against the Boston Red Sox, Chamberlain threw two pitches over the head of Kevin Youkilis. Chamberlain was subsequently ejected for the first time in his Major League career. The next day, Chamberlain was suspended for two games and fined $1,000. He pitched 16 innings without allowing an earned runs to begin his career. Chamberlain allowed his first run, a solo home run by Mike Lowell of the Red Sox, on September 16.

In Game 2 of the 2007 ALDS against the Cleveland Indians, Chamberlain was pitching in the bottom of the eighth with the Yankees leading 1–0. Suddenly, a host of small midges swarmed the field. He was repeatedly sprayed down with insect repellent, which had no apparent deterrent effect on the midges. Chamberlain threw two wild pitches, yielding the tying run. The Indians went on to win the game 2–1. The Yankees would then lose the Division Series against the Indians in four games in the best-of-five series.

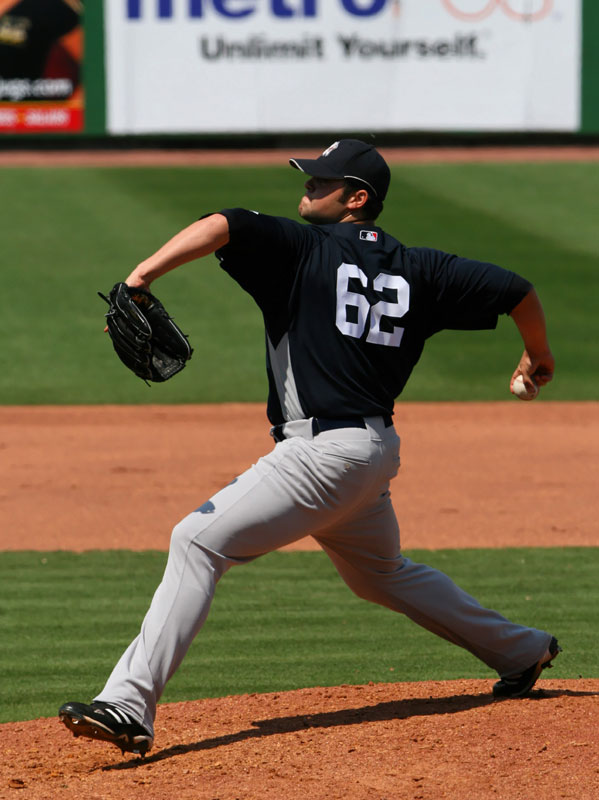
Chamberlain during 2008 spring training

Before the 2008 season, Baseball America called him the third best prospect in baseball, while Baseball Prospectus ranked him fourth overall. He went into spring training that year as a starting pitcher. However, on March 20, 2008, the Yankees announced that Chamberlain would start the season in the bullpen. Manager Joe Girardi stated that Chamberlain would be used 'without restrictions' but that the team's use of Chamberlain would be guided by common sense.

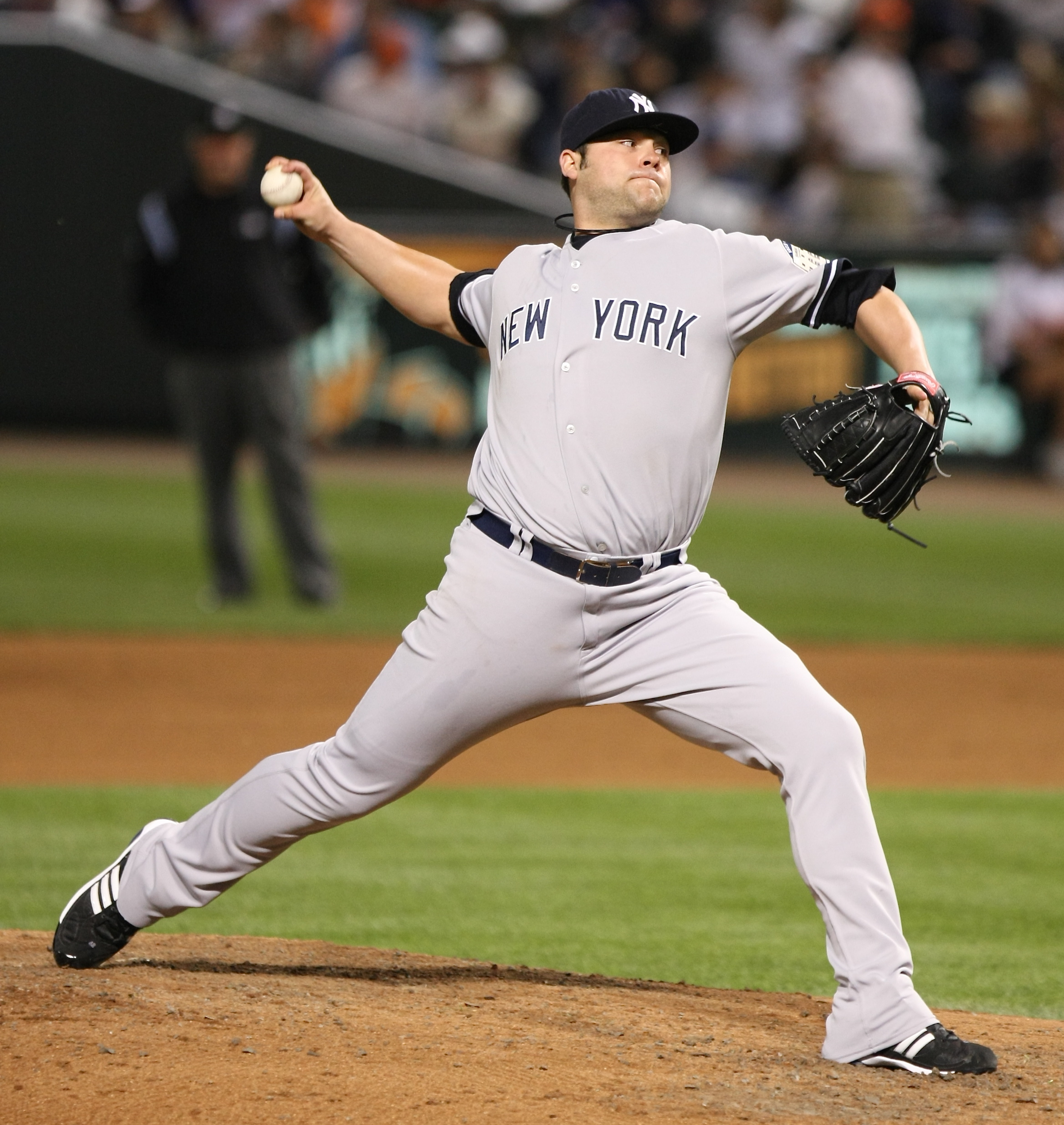
Chamberlain pitching for the Yankees in 2008

Chamberlain was granted a leave of absence on April 13, when he received news that his father was in the hospital after collapsing at his home in Lincoln, Nebraska. At the time of his leave, Joba had a record of 1–0, with a 0.00 ERA, six strikeouts, and three holds in four games and 5 1/3 innings pitched. Chamberlain returned from the bereavement in time for the second game against the Baltimore Orioles on April 19. On April 20, Hank Steinbrenner announced that he wanted Chamberlain to be moved into the rotation.

On May 6, Chamberlain allowed a go-ahead three-run home run to David Dellucci of the Cleveland Indians, allowing his first run at Yankee Stadium. At the end of the month, the team acknowledged it would be transitioning him into the starting rotation. On June 3, Chamberlain made his first MLB start against Roy Halladay and the Toronto Blue Jays lasting only 2 1/3 innings while allowing two runs, a hit and four walks. On June 25, Chamberlain earned his first career win as a starter, throwing 6 2/3 scoreless innings against the Pittsburgh Pirates, en route to a 10–0 Yankees victory.

On July 25, Chamberlain threw seven shutout innings against the Red Sox, outdueling Red Sox ace Josh Beckett, allowing only three hits and striking out nine batters. The Yankees won the game 1–0.

On August 4, Chamberlain injured his shoulder in a game against the Texas Rangers and was placed on the 15-day disabled list with rotator cuff tendinitis. Yankees General Manager Brian Cashman later acknowledged that this injury had a lasting effect.

Chamberlain ended the season with a 3–1 record and eight no-decisions.

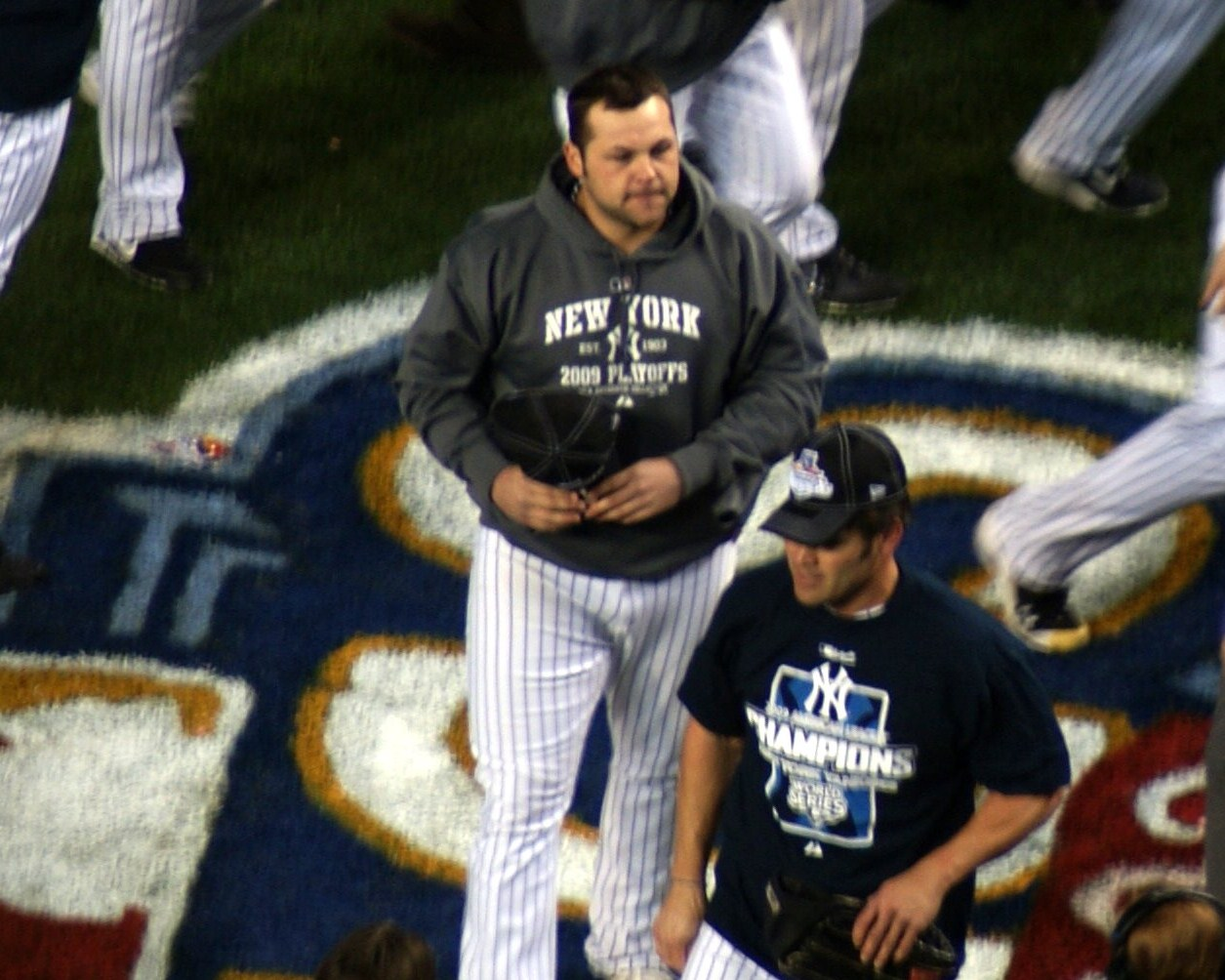
Chamberlain during the 2009 ALCS

Following the 2008 season, Hank Steinbrenner told the press that Chamberlain was expected to be in the starting rotation for the 2009 season. He noted that knowing about the team's plans for him changed his mental approach to prepare for the season, and makes things easier on him. On June 1, Chamberlain pitched a career-high eight innings in a 5–2 victory over the Indians.

During the All-Star break, Chamberlain went back home to Lincoln, Nebraska to get his mind off things by playing with his son so he could "be himself" and get more confidence on the mound. On July 19, he allowed one run on three hits and three walks while striking out eight in 6.2 innings against the Detroit Tigers to win his first game at Yankee Stadium.

Through August 12, Chamberlain maintained a 3.85 ERA before the Yankees decided to limit his innings for the year. The team would start him every seventh day and used Chad Gaudin in the rotation. Chamberlain pitched to a 8.19 ERA in his final eight starts that season. During this time, the Yankees considered demoting him to the minor leagues and even threatened to leave him off of the postseason roster. However, he ultimately remained on the roster in a set-up role as the Yankees went with a three-man starting rotation. He was used extensively out of the bullpen en route to the Yankees winning the 2009 World Series.

==== 2010–2013 ====
Heading into the new season, before spring training Yankees manager Joe Girardi declared that there would be competition for the fifth spot in the Yankees starting rotation. The favorites were most notably Chamberlain and Phil Hughes. Towards the end of spring training, Hughes was declared the winner, which sent Chamberlain back to the bullpen.

From the start of the season through July Chamberlain struggled, with an ERA over 5. His performance improved in August and September, but he was supplanted by David Robertson and Kerry Wood. Pitching in low leverage situations, Chamberlain maintained a 2.38 ERA over his last 28 appearances of the 2010 regular season. He was included on the team's postseason roster, but only appeared in three games during the ALCS.

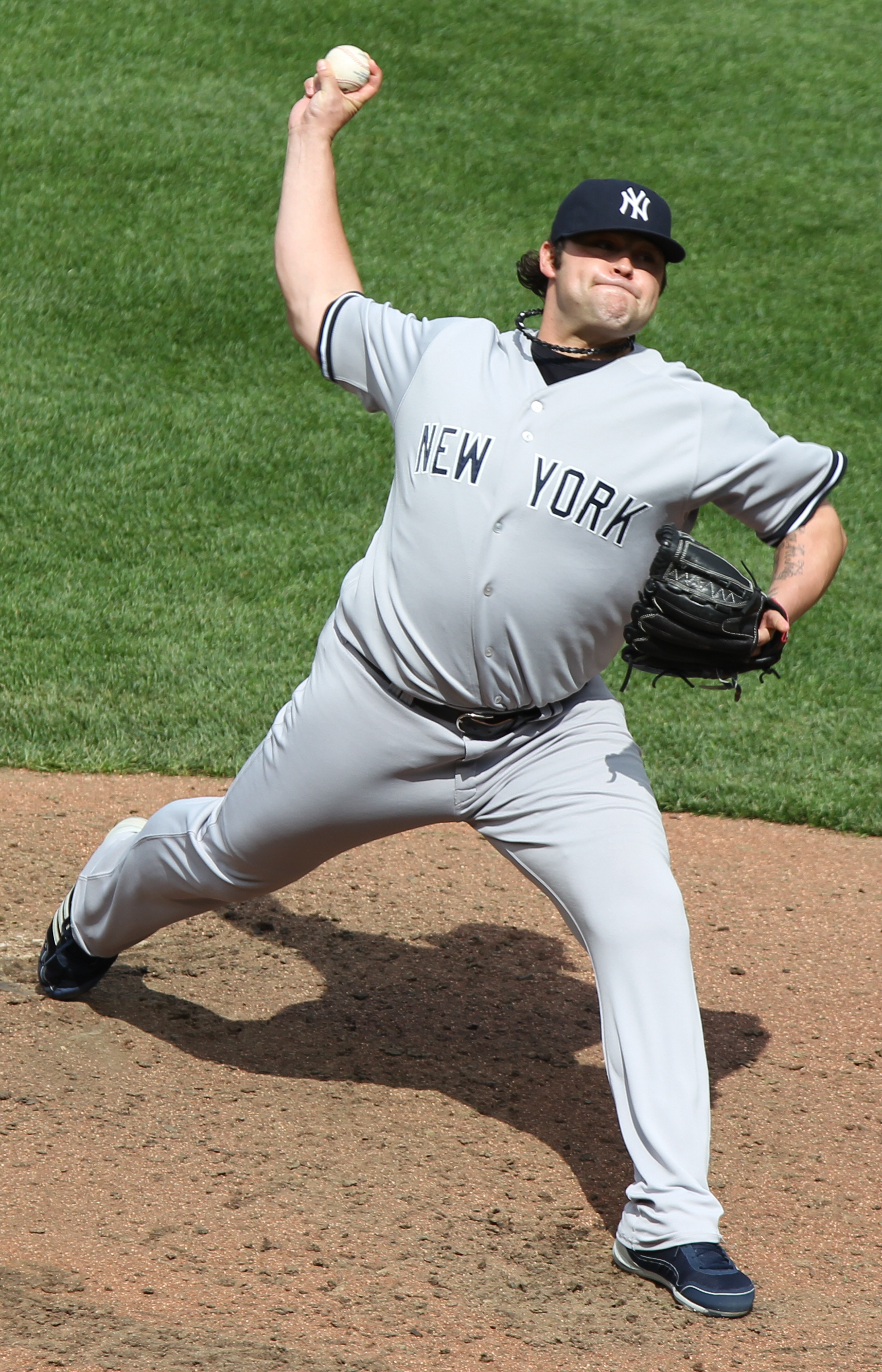
Chamberlain pitching for the Yankees in 2011

The Yankees ruled out using Chamberlain as a starting pitcher in 2011 arguing that his pitches have greater velocity when he pitches in relief. When the Yankees signed Rafael Soriano to be the set-up man to Mariano Rivera, it cast doubt on Chamberlain's future with the club. However, he ultimately stayed with the team and typically pitched the seventh inning. Chamberlain was briefly used in the eighth inning after Soriano went on the disabled list on May. He was placed on the 15 day-disabled list on June 8 due to an elbow injury and had Tommy John surgery performed on June 16 to repair a torn ligament in his right elbow, ending his season.

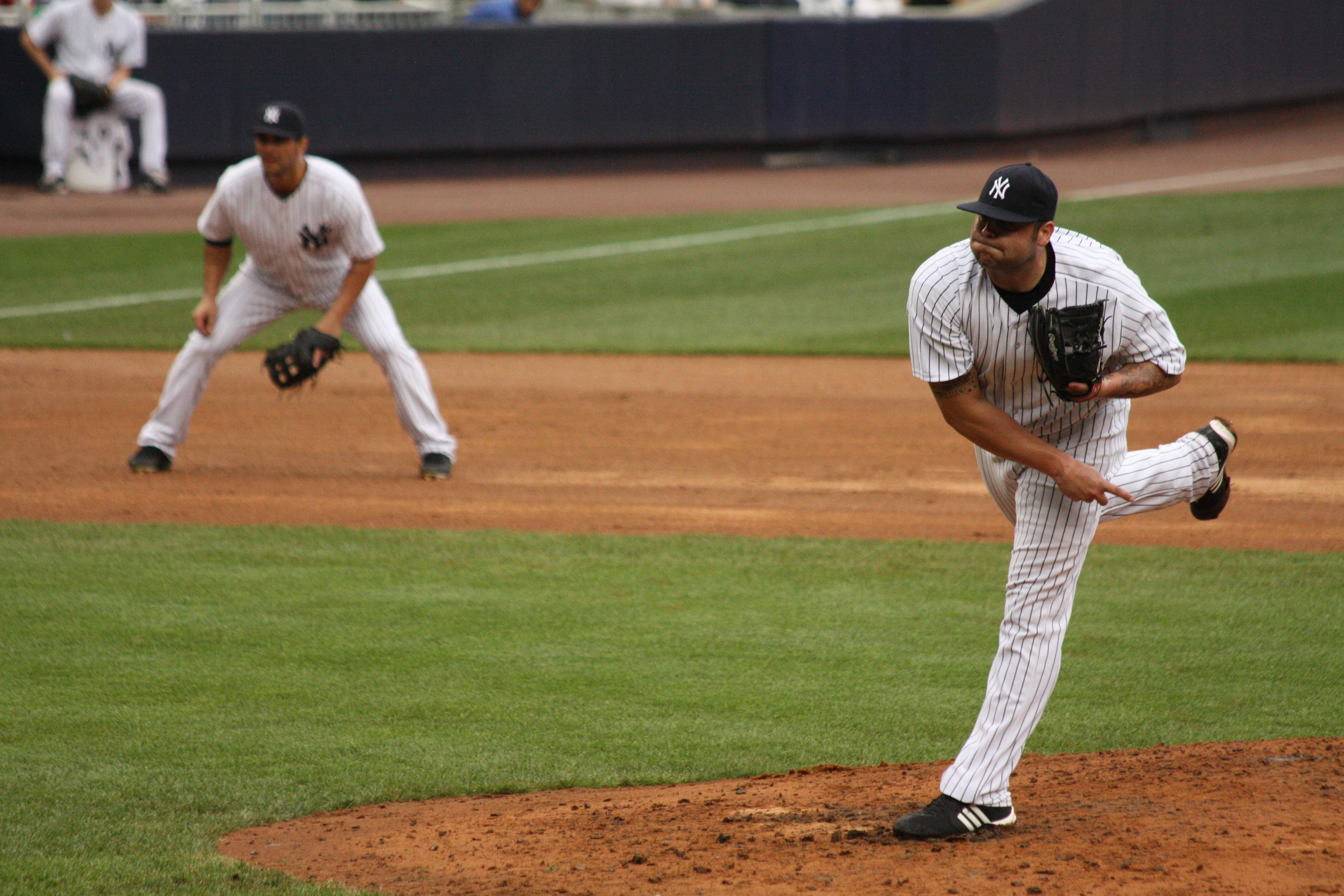
Chamberlain pitching in August 2012

In January 2012, the Yankees and Chamberlain agreed on a one-year, non-guaranteed contract worth approximately $1.675 million. On March 22, 2012, Chamberlain injured his right leg while bouncing on a trampoline in a Tampa jump center; he suffered an open dislocation of his ankle. Initial reports indicated that he had lost so much blood that onlookers at the scene feared that he might bleed to death. Chamberlain, however, later discredited these accusations during a press conference, stating that he never suffered any life-threatening injury nor did he lose much blood. Chamberlain began the 2012 season on the 60-day disabled list due to the ankle injury, while also continuing to recover from Tommy John surgery.

He returned on August 1, 2012, against the Baltimore Orioles. During the last two months of the season, Chamberlain was primarily used in the seventh inning. He was included on the team's postseason roster. In the top of the 12th inning in Game 4 of the 2012 American League Division Series, Chamberlain was struck on the elbow by a broken bat by Matt Wieters of the Orioles and left the game. Despite his injury, the Yankees won the series over Baltimore in five games, but were swept in the 2012 American League Championship Series by the Detroit Tigers.

Chamberlain started off the 2013 well, but was soon out of action by the end of April. On May 2, 2013, he was placed on the 15-day disabled list with a right oblique strain. He was activated from the DL on May 28, 2013. On September 5, 2013, Chamberlain was ejected for the second time in his career during a 9–8 loss against the Red Sox. With Jacoby Ellsbury on second after a stolen base and Shane Victorino at the plate with one out in the 10th inning, Victorino attempted to check his swing on a 1–2 pitch. First base umpire Joe West said Victorino did not swing and Victorino then singled in the go-ahead run on the very next pitch. Chamberlain was then ejected by West for arguing the check swing call after being removed from the game.

=== Detroit Tigers ===
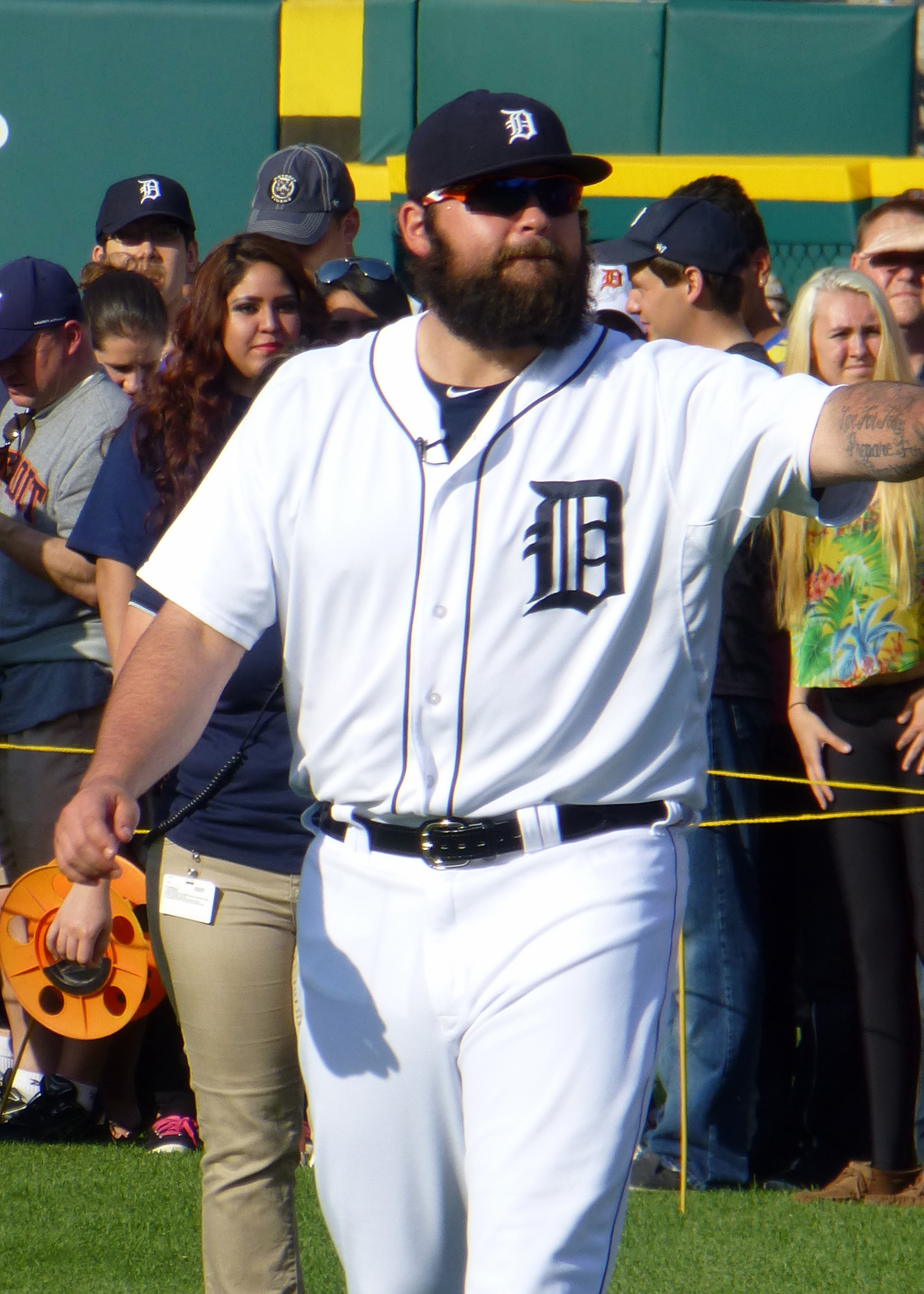
Chamberlain during his tenure with the Detroit Tigers in 2014

On December 13, 2013, the Tigers signed Chamberlain to a one-year contract, worth $2.5 million plus incentives. He entered the 2014 season having lost 15 pounds by introducing fish into his diet. Chamberlain's season got off to a rocky start when he allowed two runs on four hits in his first game of the season. However, he later cemented himself as the Tigers' set-up man. Chamberlain earned a save on April 22, in an 8–6 win over the Chicago White Sox, which was only the sixth of his career. Over the course of the season, Chamberlain grew a particularly large beard. He finished the 2014 season with a 2–5 record and a 3.57 ERA, allowing 57 hits in 63 innings with 24 walks and 59 strikeouts. Named to the Tigers' playoff roster for the ALDS against the Baltimore Orioles, he faced six batters and only managed to get one out, allowing four runs on three hits over two games.

On February 24, 2015, the Tigers re-signed Chamberlain to one-year, $1 million contract plus incentives. He had a 1.26 ERA through May, but his ERA increased to 4.09 over his next ten appearances. On July 1, Chamberlain allowed three home runs in one inning against Neil Walker, Starling Marte, and Pedro Alvarez of the Pittsburgh Pirates. After pitching to a 9.39 ERA from the beginning of June, he was designated for assignment by the Tigers on July 3. On July 10, 2015, Chamberlain was given his unconditional release.

=== Toronto Blue Jays ===
On July 21, 2015, Chamberlain signed a minor league contract with the Toronto Blue Jays. He was assigned to the Buffalo Bisons of the International League. Chamberlain exercised an opt-out in his contract on August 14, and became a free agent.

=== Kansas City Royals ===
On August 16, 2015, Chamberlain signed a minor league contract with the Kansas City Royals. After pitching in eight games for the Omaha Storm Chasers of the Class AAA Pacific Coast League, the Royals promoted Chamberlain to the major leagues on September 7. In six appearances for the Royals, Chamberlain has a 7.94 ERA. Overall, Chamberlain's ERA was 4.88 in 36 total games combined with both the Tigers and Royals in 2015.

He was not included on the Royals' playoff roster at the end of the season. Instead, Chamberlain was designated for assignment on October 27, 2015 in order to make room for Adalberto Mondesí on the team's World Series roster. The Royals would beat the New York Mets in five games to win their first championship in 30 years. Despite playing in only a few games for the Royals in the regular season that year, Chamberlain received his second World Series ring.

=== Cleveland Indians ===
On December 1, 2015, Chamberlain signed a minor league deal with the Cleveland Indians. The Indians purchased his contract on April 4, 2016, and added him to the opening day roster. On May 23, Chamberlain was placed on the disabled list with a rib cage injury. At the time, he had a 1.93 ERA in 14 games. He returned on June 8, allowing two earned runs in six innings through July 3. Chamberlain was designated for assignment on July 4. He was ultimately released on July 10 after declining an outright assignment.

=== Milwaukee Brewers ===
On January 20, 2017, Chamberlain signed a minor league contract with the Milwaukee Brewers with an invitation to spring training. Chamberlain was released prior to the start of the season on March 22.

Chamberlain announced his retirement from professional baseball on October 4, 2017, citing that it was "time to be a dad".

== Pitching repertoire ==
Chamberlain threw a four-seam fastball that early in his career was regularly in the mid-to-upper 90s, topping out at 101 mph. After his arm surgery, his fastball was in the 93-94 mph range, topping out around 97–98. He also threw a slider anywhere from 82 to 88 mph, a curveball at 78–81 mph, and an occasional changeup at 83–85 mph.

== Personal life ==
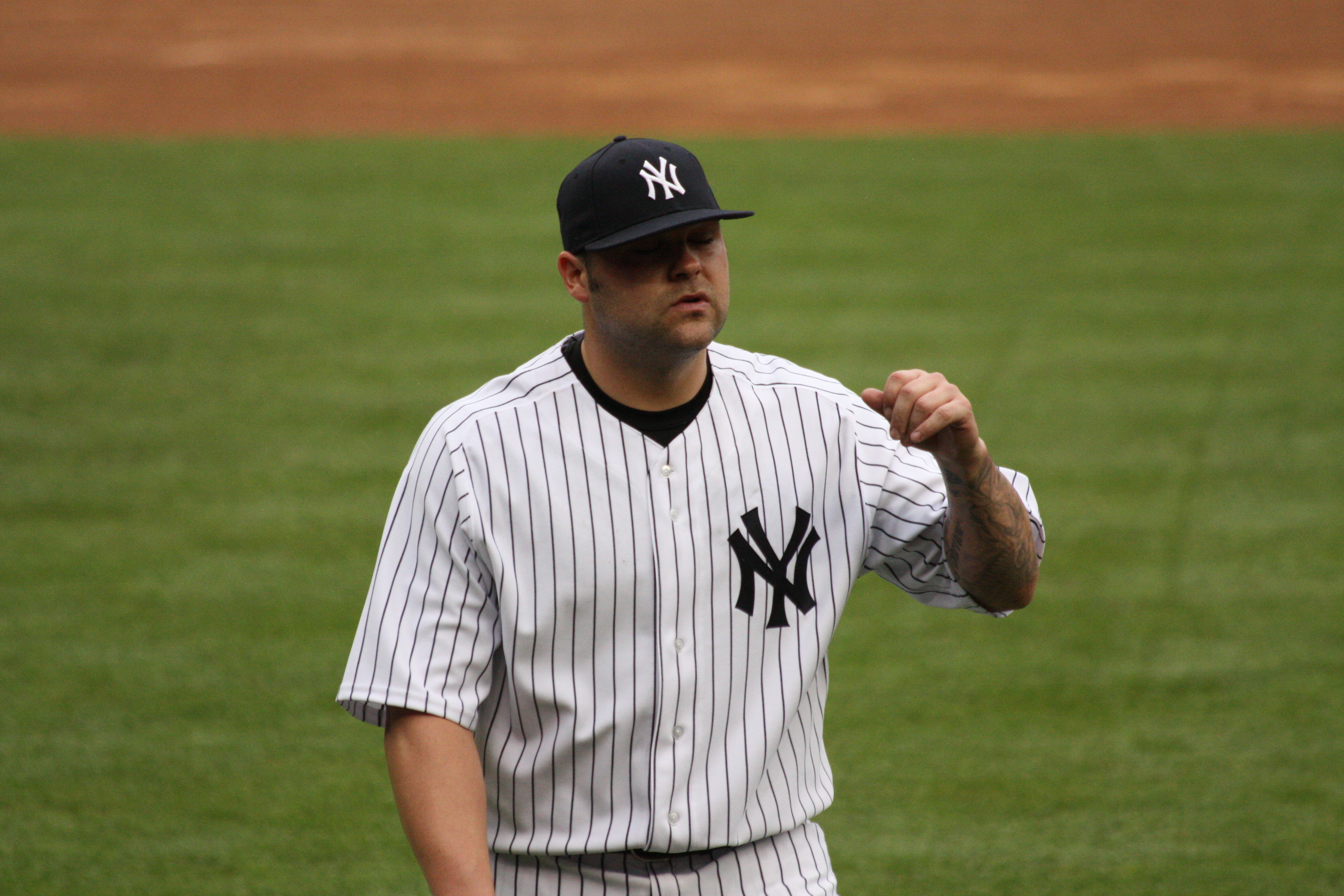
Chamberlain in 2012

Chamberlain has one son, Karter. Chamberlain made an appearance in the season 2 episode 15 of Man v. Food which airs on the Travel Channel. The episode was filmed in Brooklyn and featured Chamberlain coaching host Adam Richman through an eating challenge.

=== DUI convictions ===
On October 18, 2008, at 1:00 a.m. Chamberlain was arrested near Lincoln, Nebraska for the suspicion of driving under the influence, speeding, and having an open container of alcohol in his vehicle. A Nebraska State Patrol spokesperson said Chamberlain was stopped for speeding on U.S. Route 77 near Lincoln. His arrest was captured on police video, which later aired on the "Drivers 13" episode of truTV Presents: World's Dumbest.... His arraignment was postponed four times: in December 2008, January 2009, and twice in March 2009, all by Chamberlain's request. He pleaded guilty to drunk driving and was sentenced to probation on April 1, 2009.

Chamberlain had a second DUI incident on May 3, 2018, where his blood-alcohol level of 0.28 was more than three times the legal limit. He was charged with aggravated DUI with a prior conviction.

=== Restaurateur ===
In 2013, Chamberlain became involved in the ownership group that opened the American Whiskey bar and restaurant in Manhattan.

Chamberlain and a business partner opened a pub called Chamberlain's in Lincoln, Nebraska in September 2018. The Nebraska Liquor Control Commission approved the license under condition he not have any personal alcohol violations in the next year.

=== Financial trouble ===
Chamberlain bought a $1.15 million, 4,000-square-foot (370 m^{2}) home in Lincoln, Nebraska in 2014. Pinnacle Bank filed a notice of default on the mortgage in October 2019. A substantial amount of abandoned property was sold at auction in August 2020, including baseball cards, bobbleheads, locker room nameplates, and hundreds of household and sporting goods items. Chamberlain kept certain "high-value items", according to a person who attended the auction, including his World Series ring from the 2009 Yankees.

== Awards ==
- 2005 3rd Team All-American
- 2005 1st Team All Big 12
- 2005 Big 12 Newcomer Pitcher of the Year
- 2005 2nd Team All Midwest Region
- 2005 Big 12 Pitcher of the Week (March 1, 2005)
- 2005 National Pitcher of the Week (January 3, 2005)
- 2005 Big 12 Pitcher of the Week (April 25, 2005)
- 2006 1st Team Preseason All-American
- 2006 Hawaiian Winter Postseason All-Star
- 2007 FSL Pitcher of the Week (May 14, 2007)
- 2007 FSL Pitcher of the Week (May 28, 2007)
- 2007 EL Pitcher of the Week (June 18, 2007)
- 2009 World Series champion
