= Melvin Mercedes =

Dominican baseball player (born 1990)

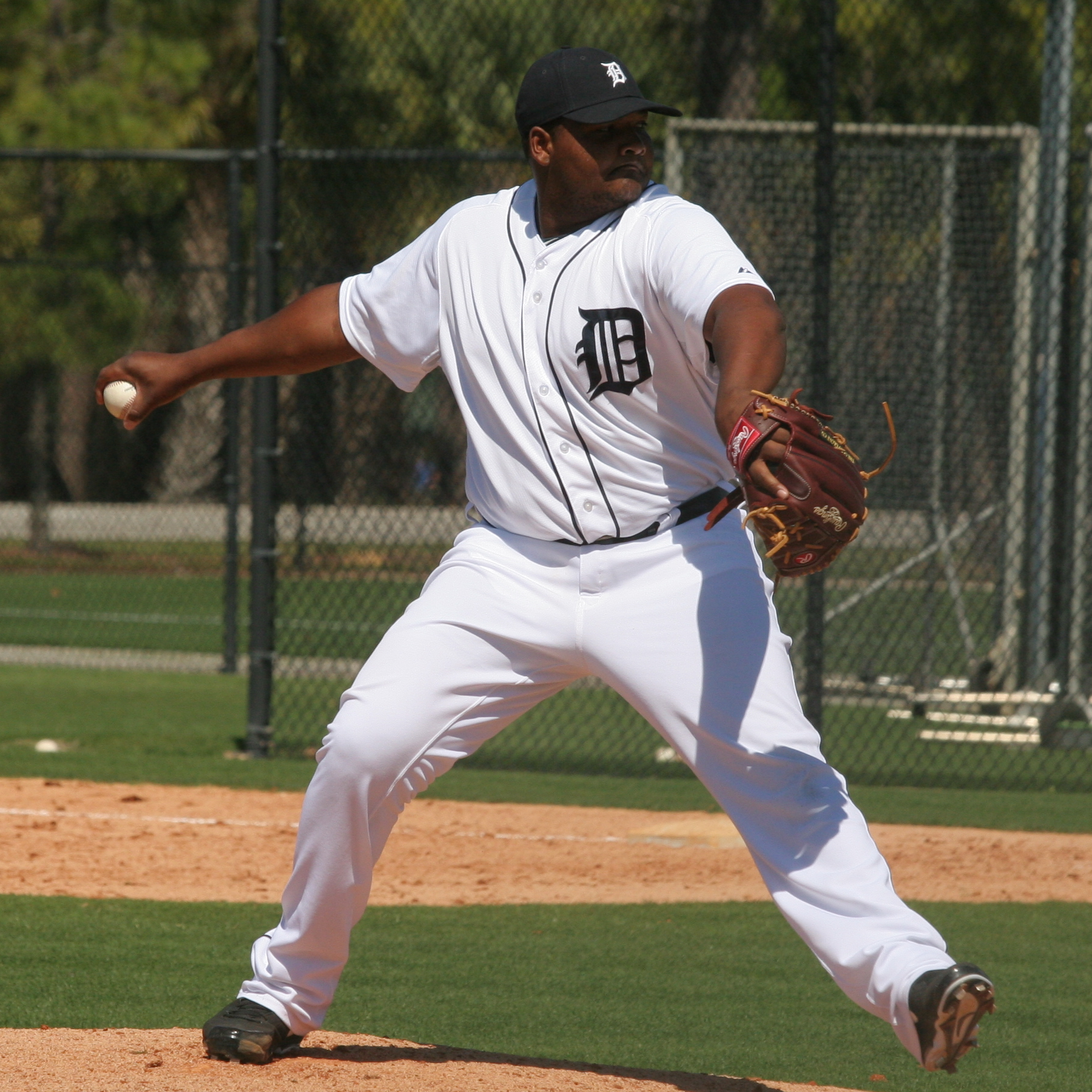
- Mercedes with the Detroit Tigers
- Pitcher
- Born: November 2, 1990 (age 35); El Seibo, Dominican Republic
- Batted: Right Threw: Right

MLB debut
- August 15, 2014, for the Detroit Tigers

Last appearance
- August 15, 2014, for the Detroit Tigers

MLB statistics
- Win–loss record: 0–0
- Earned run average: 0.00
- Strikeouts: 2
- Stats at Baseball Reference

Teams
- Detroit Tigers (2014)

Melvin Mercedes (born November 2, 1990) is a Dominican former professional baseball pitcher. He played one game in Major League Baseball (MLB) for the Detroit Tigers on August 15, 2014.

== Professional career ==
=== Detroit Tigers ===
On March 4, 2008, Mercedes signed with the Detroit Tigers as an international free agent. On November 20, 2012, the Tigers added Mercedes to their 40-man roster to protect him from the Rule 5 draft.

The Tigers promoted Mercedes to the major leagues on August 14, 2014. Before being called up, Mercedes had a 4.33 ERA and a 1.33 WHIP in 41 appearances for the Triple-A Toledo Mud Hens. Mercedes made his major league debut on August 15, when he pitched two scoreless innings, allowing no hits or walks, and recording two strikeouts. On August 17, Mercedes was optioned back to the Toledo Mud Hens. On December 11, Mercedes was designated for assignment by the Tigers. On December 19, Mercedes cleared waivers and was sent outright to Triple-A Toledo.

During the 2015 season, he split time between the Double-A Erie SeaWolves and Triple-A Toledo Mud Hens. On December 23, 2015, the Tigers re-signed Mercedes to a minor league contract. On March 23, 2016, Mercedes was released by the Tigers.

=== Guerreros de Oaxaca ===
On May 6, 2016, Mercedes signed with the Guerreros de Oaxaca of the Mexican League. In 35 appearances for Oaxaca, he posted a 5–2 record and 4.73 ERA with 21 strikeouts across 32 1/3 innings of relief. Mercedes was released by the Guerreros on July 7.

=== York Revolution ===
On April 5, 2017, Mercedes signed with the York Revolution of the Atlantic League of Professional Baseball. In 7 games for York, he compiled a 3.68 ERA with 8 strikeouts across 7 1/3 innings pitched. Mercedes was released by the Revolution on May 14.
