= Evan Reed =

American baseball player (born 1985)

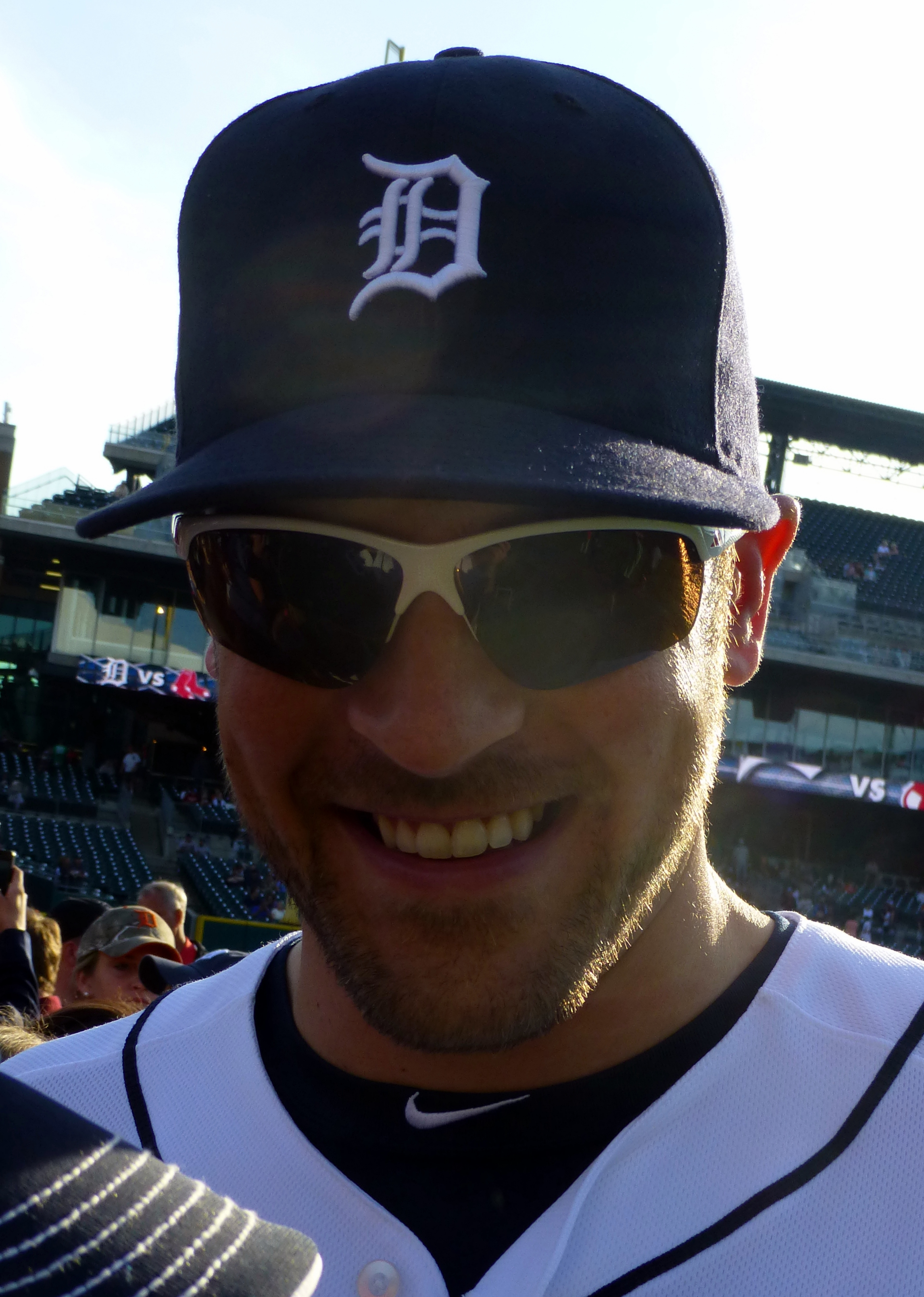
- Reed with the Detroit Tigers
- Pitcher
- Born: December 31, 1985 (age 40); San Luis Obispo, California, U.S.
- Batted: Right Threw: Right

MLB debut
- May 16, 2013, for the Detroit Tigers

Last MLB appearance
- September 19, 2014, for the Detroit Tigers

MLB statistics
- Win–loss record: 0–2
- Earned run average: 4.20
- Strikeouts: 43
- Stats at Baseball Reference

Teams
- Detroit Tigers (2013–2014)

Evan David Reed (born December 31, 1985) is an American former professional baseball pitcher. He played Major League Baseball (MLB) for the Detroit Tigers.

== Early life ==
Reed attended Quincy High School in Quincy, California, and California Polytechnic State University in San Luis Obispo, California. He was drafted in the third round of the 2007 Major League Baseball draft by the Texas Rangers.

== Professional career ==
=== Texas Rangers, Miami Marlins ===
On July 29, 2010, Reed and Omar Poveda were traded to the Florida Marlins in exchange for Jorge Cantú. Reed was designated for assignment by the Marlins in 2013 and subsequently claimed by the Tigers.

=== Detroit Tigers ===
On May 16, 2013, the Tigers promoted Reed to the major leagues for the first time. Reed pitched in two games before being optioned to Toledo on May 19. He was again promoted to the major league roster on June 9, sent to the minor league Toledo Mud Hens, and brought up to the Tigers again on July 7. He was optioned to Toledo on August 5, and was recalled when the rosters expanded on September 1. In 16 games with Detroit, Reed was 0–1 with a 4.24 ERA, striking out 17 in 23 1/3 innings.

Reed made the Tigers' Opening Day roster in 2014 after a strong Spring training. He had a 1.59 ERA in nine appearances, giving up just three hits in 11 1/3 innings pitched. On June 18, 2014, Reed was designated for assignment to replenish the Tigers taxed bullpen, while Chad Smith was called up to replace Reed. The previous night, Reed gave up four runs, one earned, without recording an out. In 26 appearances Reed was 0–1 with a 4.88 ERA and four holds, striking out 23 in 25 2/3 innings. Reed's 4.88 ERA was essentially split between two stretches. He held opponents scoreless in 13 of his first 16 appearances this season, posting a 2.81 ERA, then gave up 19 hits over 11 2/3 innings in his final 11 appearances. While his strikeout rate rose, so did his damage as he struggled to keep his pitches down. On June 26, Reed cleared waivers and was sent outright to the Triple-A Toledo Mud Hens. On August 28, it was announced that the Tigers purchased Reed's contract from Toledo. On November 1, Reed declined his minor league assignment and became a free agent.

=== Amarillo Thunderheads ===
Reed signed with the Amarillo Thunderheads of the American Association of Independent Professional Baseball for the 2015 season. He became a free agent at the end of the season.

=== Lincoln Saltdogs ===
On February 19, 2016, Reed signed with the Lincoln Saltdogs of the American Association of Independent Professional Baseball.

=== Sugar Land Skeeters ===
On April 19, 2017, Reed signed with the Sugar Land Skeeters of the Atlantic League of Professional Baseball.

=== Southern Maryland Blue Crabs ===
He was released by the team but signed with the Southern Maryland Blue Crabs on September 12. He became a free agent after the 2017 season.

== Pitch selection ==
Reed relies primarily on a hard four-seam fastball in the 95–97 MPH range, and a slider in the 81–85 MPH range. He also throws a two-seam fastball around 93–95 MPH, and an occasional changeup averaging between 86 and 89 MPH.

== Personal life ==
Reed was accused of sexual assault on March 30, 2014, a day before the Tigers' home opener against the Kansas City Royals. On July 30, 2014, Wayne County Prosecutor Kym Worthy announced that Reed was charged with two counts of third-degree criminal sexual conduct. The two charges carry a penalty of up to 15 years in prison, if convicted. The charges stem from an alleged incident involving Reed and a 45-year-old woman at the MotorCity Casino Hotel in the early morning hours of March 30, the day before Opening Day. On August 21, Judge Kenneth King dismissed two charges of third-degree criminal sexual conduct against Reed as part of a plea bargain after hearing testimony from the alleged victim, her friend, and an investigator. King said prosecutors failed to meet the burden of probable cause on the accusations against Reed. Another judge reinstated the charges in November and ordered the case to trial. On July 17, 2015, Reed pleaded no contest to a misdemeanor aggravated assault charge, and was sentenced to probation on August 7.
