= Kevin Whelan =

American baseball player (born 1984)

- Pitcher
- Born: January 8, 1984 (age 42); Kerrville, Texas, U.S.
- Batted: Right Threw: Right

MLB debut
- June 10, 2011, for the New York Yankees

Last appearance
- August 11, 2014, for the Detroit Tigers

MLB statistics
- Win–loss record: 0–0
- Earned run average: 9.00
- Strikeouts: 2
- Stats at Baseball Reference

Teams
- New York Yankees (2011); Detroit Tigers (2014)

Kevin J. Whelan (born January 8, 1984) is an American former Major League Baseball (MLB) pitcher who played for the New York Yankees in 2011 and for the Detroit Tigers in 2014.

== Amateur career ==
Whelan attended Texas A&M University, where he played for the Texas A&M Aggies baseball team. In 2004, he played collegiate summer baseball with the Wareham Gatemen of the Cape Cod Baseball League, where he was named a league all-star and received the league's Outstanding Relief Pitcher award.

== Professional career ==
=== Detroit Tigers ===
Whelan was drafted by the Detroit Tigers in the fourth round of the 2005 Major League Baseball draft.

=== New York Yankees ===
On November 14, 2006, Whelan was traded to the New York Yankees, along with Humberto Sánchez and Anthony Claggett, for Gary Sheffield.

He was called up by the Yankees on June 10, 2011, after recording a 1–1 won–loss record with a 1.67 earned run average and 18 saves as the closer for the Triple-A Scranton/Wilkes-Barre Yankees. He allowed four consecutive walks after recording two outs in his first ever appearance that same evening.

On January 26, 2012, he was designated for assignment to make room for Hiroki Kuroda.

=== Cincinnati Reds ===
On January 3, 2013, the Cincinnati Reds signed Whelan to a minor league deal.

=== Detroit Tigers (second stint) ===
On February 22, 2014, the Tigers signed Whelan to a minor league deal. On August 11, the Tigers purchased his contract from the Triple-A Toledo Mud Hens, and he was added to the 25-man active roster. Prior to being called up, Whelan had 20 saves for the Toledo Mud Hens, having allowed eight runs on 26 hits over 39 innings with 48 strikeouts. In Whelan's debut with the Tigers, he pitched 1 1/3 innings, allowing three hits, and two earned runs on back-to-back home runs. On August 16, Whelan was designated for assignment by the Tigers. The next day on August 17, the Tigers outrighted Whelan to Triple-A. He elected free agency in October 2014.

=== Oakland Athletics ===
On November 1, 2014, the Oakland Athletics signed Whelan to a minor league contract. He played for the Triple-A Nashville Sounds in 2015 before electing to become a free agent after the season.
