= Detroit Tigers all-time roster =

This is a list of players, both past and current, who appeared at least in one game for the Detroit Tigers, with their main position and years played.

Players in Bold are members of the National Baseball Hall of Fame.

Players in Italics have had their numbers retired by the team.

== A ==
- Glenn Abbott, P, 1983–1984
- Al Aber, P, 1953–1957
- Juan Acevedo, P, 2002
- Austin Adams, P, 2019
- Bob Adams, IF, 1977
- Jim Adduci, OF, 2017–2018
- Hank Aguirre, P, 1958–1967
- Pat Ahearne, P, 1995
- Eddie Ainsmith, C, 1919–1921
- Bill Akers, IF, 1929–1931
- Al Alburquerque, P, 2011–2015
- Sergio Alcántara, IF, 2020
- Victor Alcántara, P, 2017–2019
- Scott Aldred, P, 1990–1992, 1996
- Dale Alexander, IF, 1929–1932
- Doyle Alexander, P, 1987–1989
- Tyler Alexander, P, 2019–2023
- Andy Allanson, C, 1991
- Dusty Allen, IF, 2000
- Rod Allen, DH, 1984
- Ernie Alten, P, 1920
- George Alusik, OF, 1958–1962
- Luis Alvarado, IF, 1977
- Gabe Alvarez, IF, 1998–2000
- José Álvarez, P, 2013
- Ossie Álvarez, IF, 1959
- Sandy Amorós, OF, 1960
- Bob Anderson, P, 1963
- Drew Anderson, P, 2026–present
- Josh Anderson, OF, 2009
- Matt Anderson, P, 1998–2003
- Jimmy Archer, C, 1907
- George Archie, IF, 1938
- Harry Arndt, IF, 1902
- Fernando Arroyo, P, 1975–1979
- Elden Auker, P, 1933–1938
- Brad Ausmus, C, 1996, 1999–2000
- **Earl Averill**, OF, 1939–1940
- Steve Avery, P, 2003
- Alex Avila, C, 2009–2015, 2017
- Mike Avilés, IF, 2016
- Erick Aybar, IF, 2016
- Doc Ayers, P, 1919–1921

== B ==
- Akil Baddoo, OF, 2021–2025
- Javier Báez, IF, 2022–present
- Sandy Báez, P, 2018–2019
- Bill Bailey, P, 1918
- Howard Bailey, P, 1981–1983
- Doug Bair, P, 1983–1985
- Del Baker, C, 1914–1916
- Doug Baker, IF, 1984–1987
- Jeff Baker, IF, 2012
- Steve Baker, P, 1978–1979
- Paul Bako, C, 1998
- Billy Baldwin, OF, 1975
- Collin Balester, P, 2012
- Chris Bando, C, 1988
- Johnny Barbato, P, 2018
- Ray Bare, P, 1975–1977
- Clyde Barfoot, P, 1926
- Frank Barnes, P, 1929
- Jacob Barnes, P, 2022
- Sam Barnes, IF, 1921
- Skeeter Barnes, IF, 1991–1994
- Tucker Barnhart, C, 2022
- Jimmy Barrett, OF, 1901–1905
- Kimera Bartee, OF, 1996–1999
- Dick Bartell, IF, 1940–1941
- Al Baschang, OF, 1912
- Johnny Bassler, C, 1921–1927
- Matt Batts, C, 1952–1954
- Paddy Baumann, IF, 1911–1914
- Harry Baumgartner, P, 1920
- John Baumgartner, IF, 1953
- Danny Bautista, OF, 1993–1996
- Denny Bautista, P, 2008
- José Bautista, P, 1997
- Yorman Bazardo, P, 2007–2008
- Trey Beamon, OF, 1998
- Billy Bean, OF, 1987–1989
- Billy Beane, OF, 1988
- Dave Beard, P, 1989
- Gene Bearden, P, 1951
- Boom-Boom Beck, P, 1944
- Erve Beck, IF, 1902
- Heinie Beckendorf, C, 1909–1910
- Rich Becker, OF, 2000–2001
- Gordon Beckham, IF, 2019
- Wayne Belardi, IF, 1954–1956
- Tim Belcher, P, 1994
- Francis Beltrán, P, 2008
- Beau Bell, OF, 1939
- Chad Bell, P, 2017–2018
- Duane Below, P, 2011–2013
- Joaquín Benoit, P, 2011–2013
- Al Benton, P, 1938–1948
- Lou Berberet, C, 1959–1960
- Juan Berenguer, P, 1982–1985
- Dave Bergman, IF, 1984–1992
- Sean Bergman, P, 1993–1996
- Tony Bernazard, IF, 1991
- Adam Bernero, P, 2000–2003
- Johnny Bero, IF, 1948
- Gerónimo Berroa, DH, 1998
- Neil Berry, IF, 1948–1952
- Quintin Berry, OF, 2012
- Reno Bertoia, IF, 1953–1958, 1961–1962
- Wilson Betemit, IF, 2011
- Jason Beverlin, P, 2002
- Monte Beville, C, 1904
- Steve Bilko, IF, 1960
- Jack Billingham, P, 1978–1980
- Josh Billings, P, 1927–1929
- Babe Birrer, P, 1955
- Bud Black, P, 1952–1956
- Willie Blair, P, 1996–2001
- Ike Blessitt, OF, 1972
- Ben Blomdahl, P, 1995
- Jimmy Bloodworth, IF, 1942–1946
- Lu Blue, IF, 1921–1927
- Hiram Bocachica, OF, 2002–2003
- Doug Bochtler, P, 1998
- Randy Bockus, P, 1989
- Brennan Boesch, OF, 2010–2012
- George Boehler, P, 1912–1916
- Joe Boever, P, 1993–1995
- John Bogart, P, 1920
- Brian Bohanon, P, 1995
- Bernie Boland, P, 1915–1920
- Frank Bolling, IF, 1954–1960
- Milt Bolling, IF, 1958
- Cliff Bolton, C, 1937
- Tom Bolton, P, 1993
- Jorge Bonifacio, OF, 2020
- Jeremy Bonderman, P, 2003–2010, 2013
- Eddie Bonine, P, 2008–2010
- Dan Boone, P, 1921
- Ray Boone, IF, 1953–1958
- Dave Borkowski, P, 1999–2001
- Red Borom, IF, 1944–1945
- Steve Boros, IF, 1957–1962
- Hank Borowy, P, 1950–1957
- Dave Boswell, P, 1971
- Matt Boyd, P, 2015–2021
- Jim Brady, P, 1956
- Ralph Branca, P, 1953–1954
- John Brebbia, P, 2025
- Jim Brideweser, IF, 1956
- Rocky Bridges, IF, 1959–1960
- Tommy Bridges, P, 1930–1946
- Beau Brieske, P, 2022–present
- Ed Brinkman, IF, 1971–1974
- Braden Bristo, P, 2023
- Doug Brocail, P, 1997–2000
- Rico Brogna, IF, 1992–1994
- Ike Brookens, P, 1975
- Tom Brookens, IF, 1979–1988
- Louis Brower, IF, 1931
- Chris Brown, IF, 1989
- Darrell Brown, OF, 1981
- Dick Brown, C, 1961–1962
- Gates Brown, OF, 1963–1975
- Ike Brown, IF, 1969–1974
- Frank Browning, P, 1910
- Bob Bruce, P, 1959–1961
- Andy Bruckmiller, P, 1905
- Mike Brumley, IF, 1989
- Arlo Brunsberg, C, 1966
- Will Brunson, P, 1998–1999
- Bill Bruton, OF, 1961–1964
- Johnny Bucha, C, 1953
- Don Buddin, IF, 1962
- Fritz Buelow, C, 1901–1904
- George Bullard, IF, 1954
- **Jim Bunning**, P, 1955–1963
- Les Burke, IF, 1923–1926
- Bill Burns, P, 1912
- George Burns, IF, 1914–1917
- Jack Burns, IF, 1936
- Jack Burns, IF, 1903–1904
- Joe Burns, OF, 1913
- Pete Burnside, P, 1959–1960
- Sheldon Burnside, P, 1978–1979
- Beau Burrows, P, 2020–2021
- Donie Bush, IF, 1908–1921
- Sal Butera, C, 1983
- Harry Byrd, P, 1957
- Tim Byrdak, P, 2007

== C ==
- Enos Cabell, IF, 1982–1983
- Miguel Cabrera, IF, 2008–2023
- Greg Cadaret, P, 1994
- Bob Cain, P, 1951
- Les Cain, P, 1968–1972
- Brett Callahan, OF, 2026–present
- Paul Calvert, P, 1950–1951
- Daz Cameron, OF, 2020–2022
- Bill Campbell, P, 1986
- Bruce Campbell, OF, 1940–1941
- Dave Campbell, IF, 1967–1969
- Paul Campbell, IF, 1948–1950
- Jeimer Candelario, IF, 2017–2022
- Mark Canha, OF, 2024
- Guy Cantrell, P, 1930
- José Capellán, P, 2007
- George Cappuzzello, P, 1981
- Javier Cardona, C, 2000–2002
- Fred Carisch, C, 1923
- Drew Carlton, P, 2021–2022
- Kerry Carpenter, OF, 2022–present
- Ryan Carpenter, P, 2018–2019
- Charlie Carr, IF, 1903–1904
- Mark Carreon, OF, 1992
- Ezequiel Carrera, OF, 2014
- Ownie Carroll, P, 1925–1930
- Frank Carswell, OF, 1953
- Chuck Cary, P, 1985–1986
- Jerry Casale, P, 1961–1962
- Raul Casanova, C, 1996–1999
- Doc Casey, IF, 1901–1902
- Joe Casey, C, 1909–1911
- Sean Casey, IF, 2006–2007
- Norm Cash, IF, 1960–1974
- Ron Cash, IF, 1973–1974
- Nicholas Castellanos, OF, 2013–2019
- George Caster, P, 1945–1946
- Frank Castillo, P, 1998
- Luis Castillo, P, 2022
- Marty Castillo, IF, 1981–1985
- Anthony Castro, P, 2020
- Harold Castro, IF, 2018–2022
- Willi Castro, IF, 2019–2022
- Frank Catalanotto, OF, 1997–1999
- Pug Cavet, P, 1911–1915
- Andújar Cedeño, IF, 1996
- Roger Cedeño, OF, 2000–2001
- John Cerutti, P, 1991
- Yoenis Céspedes, OF, 2015
- Andrew Chafin, P, 2022, 2024
- Joba Chamberlain, P, 2014–2015
- Dean Chance, P, 1971
- Harry Chiti, C, 1960–1961
- Mike Chris, P, 1979
- Neil Chrisley, OF, 1959–1960
- Bob Christian, OF, 1968
- Mark Christman, IF, 1938–1939
- Mike Christopher, P, 1995–1996
- Al Cicotte, P, 1958
- Eddie Cicotte, P, 1905
- José Cisnero, P, 2019–2023
- Davey Claire, IF, 1920
- Danny Clark, IF, 1922
- Jermaine Clark, OF, 2001
- Max Clark, OF, 2026–present
- Mel Clark, OF, 1957
- Phil Clark, OF, 1992
- Tony Clark, IF, 1995–2001
- Nig Clarke, C, 1905
- Rufe Clarke, P, 1923–1924
- Al Clauss, P, 1913
- Kody Clemens, IF/OF, 2022
- Brent Clevlen, OF, 2006–2007
- Flea Clifton, IF, 1934–1937
- Joe Cobb, DH, 1918
- **Ty Cobb**, OF, 1905–1926
- **Mickey Cochrane**, C, 1934–1937
- Jack Coffey, IF, 1918
- Slick Coffman, P, 1937–1939
- Phil Coke, P, 2010–2014
- Rocky Colavito, OF, 1960–1963
- Nate Colbert, IF, 1975
- Bert Cole, P, 1921–1925
- Joe Coleman, P, 1955
- Joe Coleman, P, 1971–1976
- Louis Coleman, P, 2018
- Vince Coleman, OF, 1997
- Darnell Coles, IF, 1986–1987, 1990
- Orlin Collier, P, 1931
- Dave Collins, OF, 1986
- Kevin Collins, IF, 1970–1971
- Rip Collins, P, 1923–1927
- Tyler Collins, OF, 2014–2017
- Román Colón, P, 2005–2007
- Steve Colyer, P, 2004
- Wayne Comer, OF, 1967–1968, 1972
- Ralph Comstock, P, 1913
- Dick Conger, P, 1940
- Allen Conkwright, P, 1920
- Bill Connelly, P, 1950
- Earl Cook, P, 1941
- Duff Cooley, OF, 1905
- Jack Coombs, P, 1920
- Wilbur Cooper, P, 1926
- Tim Corcoran, IF, 1977–1980
- Francisco Cordero, P, 1999
- Nate Cornejo, P, 2001–2004
- Red Corriden, IF, 1912
- Chuck Cottier, IF, 1961
- Johnny Couch, P, 1917
- Bill Coughlin, IF, 1904–1908
- Ernie Courtney, IF, 1903
- Harry Coveleski, P, 1914–1918
- Tex Covington, P, 1911–1912
- Al Cowens, OF, 1980–1981
- Red Cox, P, 1920
- Doc Cramer, OF, 1942–1948
- Jim Crawford, P, 1976–1978
- **Sam Crawford**, OF, 1903–1917
- Doug Creek, P, 2005
- Jack Crimian, P, 1957
- Leo Cristante, P, 1955
- Davey Crockett, IF, 1901
- C. J. Cron, IF, 2020
- Jack Cronin, P, 1901–1902
- Casey Crosby, P, 2012
- Frank Croucher, IF, 1939–1941
- Dean Crow, P, 1998
- Alvin Crowder, P, 1934–1936
- Francisco Cruceta, P, 2008
- Roy Crumpler, P, 1920
- Deivi Cruz, IF, 1997–2001
- Fausto Cruz, IF, 1996
- Jacob Cruz, OF, 2002
- Nelson Cruz, P, 1999–2000
- Trei Cruz, OF, 2026
- William Cuevas, P, 2017
- Roy Cullenbine, OF, 1938–1939, 1945–1947
- John Cummings, P, 1996–1997
- George Cunningham, P, 1916–1921
- Jim Curry, IF, 1918
- Chad Curtis, OF, 1995–1996
- George Cutshaw, IF, 1922–1923
- Milt Cuyler, OF, 1990–1995

== D ==
- Jack Dalton, OF, 1916
- Mike Dalton, P, 1991
- Johnny Damon, OF, 2010
- Chuck Daniel, P, 1957
- Vic Darensbourg, P, 2005
- Jeff Datz, C, 1989
- Doc Daugherty, PH, 1951
- Hooks Dauss, P, 1912–1926
- Jerry Davie, P, 1959
- Brendon Davis, IF, 2022
- Eric Davis, OF, 1993–1994
- Harry Davis, IF, 1932–1933
- Rajai Davis, OF, 2014–2015
- Storm Davis, P, 1993–1994
- Woody Davis, P, 1938
- Charlie Deal, IF, 1912–1913
- Rob Deer, OF, 1991–1993
- John Deering, P, 1903
- Tony DeFate, IF, 1917
- Ángel De Jesús, P, 2022
- Enmanuel De Jesus. P, 2026–present
- Iván DeJesús, IF, 1988
- Mark DeJohn, IF, 1982
- Eulogio De La Cruz, P, 2006–2007
- Miguel Del Pozo, P, 2021
- Jim Delahanty, IF, 1909–1912
- Jim Delsing, OF, 1952–1956
- Travis Demeritte, OF, 2019–2020
- Don Demeter, OF, 1964–1966
- Steve Demeter, IF, 1959
- Ray Demmitt, OF, 1914
- Matt den Dekker, OF, 2017
- Bill Denehy, P, 1971
- Gene Desautels, C, 1930–1933
- John DeSilva, P, 1993
- Bernie DeViveiros, IF, 1927
- Isan Díaz, IF, 2023
- Miguel Díaz, P, 2022–2023
- Yilber Díaz, P, 2026–present
- Mike DiFelice, C, 2004
- Bob Didier, C, 1973
- Steve Dillard, IF, 1978
- Pop Dillon, IF, 1901–1902
- Dillon Dingler, C, 2024–present
- Craig Dingman, P, 2004–2005
- Andy Dirks, OF, 2011–2013
- George Disch, P, 1905
- Glenn Dishman, P, 1997
- Jack Dittmer, IF, 1957
- Brandon Dixon, IF, 2019–2020
- Brent Dlugach, IF, 2009
- Pat Dobson, P, 1967–1969
- **Larry Doby**, OF, 1959
- John Doherty, P, 1992–1995
- Frank Doljack, OF, 1930–1934
- Freddy Dolsi, P, 2008–2009
- Red Donahue, P, 1906
- Jim Donohue, P, 1961
- Wild Bill Donovan, P, 1903–1912, 1918
- Dick Donovan, P, 1954
- Tom Doran, C, 1905
- Octavio Dotel, P, 2012–2013
- Sean Douglass, P, 2005
- Snooks Dowd, IF, 1919
- Darin Downs, P, 2012–2013
- Red Downs, IF, 1907–1908
- Jess Doyle, P, 1925–1927
- Delos Drake, OF, 1911
- Lee Dressen, IF, 1918
- Lew Drill, C, 1904–1905
- Walt Dropo, IF, 1952–1954
- Brian Dubois, P, 1989–1990
- Jean Dubuc, P, 1912–1916
- Joe Dugan, IF, 1931
- Roberto Durán, P, 1997–1998
- Chad Durbin, P, 2006–2007
- Bob Dustal, P, 1963
- Ben Dyer, IF, 1916–1919
- Duffy Dyer, C, 1980–1981

== E ==
- Scott Earl, IF, 1984
- Damion Easley, IF, 1996–2002
- Mal Eason, P, 1903
- Paul Easterling, OF, 1928–1930
- Zeb Eaton, P, 1944–1945
- Eric Eckenstahler, P, 2002–2003
- Dick Egan, P, 1963–1964
- Wish Egan, P, 1902
- Howard Ehmke, P, 1916–1922
- Joey Eischen, P, 1996
- Harry Eisenstat, P, 1938–1939
- Kid Elberfeld, IF, 1901–1903
- Heinie Elder, P, 1913
- Brad Eldred, IF, 2012
- Babe Ellison, IF, 1916–1920
- Juan Encarnación, OF, 1997–2001
- Dave Engle, C, 1986
- Mason Englert, P, 2023–2024
- Gil English, IF, 1936–1937
- John Ennis, P, 2004
- Dietrich Enns, P, 2025
- Eric Erickson, P, 1916–1919
- Hal Erickson, P, 1953
- Tex Erwin, C, 1907
- John Eubank, P, 1905–1907
- Bart Evans, P, 2000
- Darrell Evans, IF, 1984–1988
- Adam Everett, IF, 2009–2010
- Hoot Evers, OF, 1941–1952, 1954

== F ==
- Roy Face, P, 1968
- Alex Faedo, P, 2022–2024
- Bill Fahey, C, 1981–1983
- Ferris Fain, IF, 1955
- Bob Farley, IF, 1962
- Buck Farmer, P, 2014–2021
- Ed Farmer, P, 1973
- Jeff Farnsworth, P, 2002
- Kyle Farnsworth, P, 2005, 2008
- John Farrell, P, 1996
- Bill Faul, P, 1962–1964
- Al Federoff, IF, 1951–1952
- Junior Félix, OF, 1994
- Neftalí Feliz, P, 2015
- Jack Feller, C, 1958
- Chico Fernández, IF, 1960–1963
- José Fernández, P, 2019
- Jeff Ferrell, P, 2015, 2017
- Cy Ferry, P, 1904
- Robert Fick, IF, 1998–2002
- Mark Fidrych, P, 1976–1980
- Cecil Fielder, IF, 1990–1996
- Prince Fielder, IF, 2012–2013
- Bruce Fields, OF, 1986
- Daniel Fields, OF, 2015
- Casey Fien, P, 2009–2010
- Mike Fiers, P, 2018
- Alfredo Fígaro, P, 2009–2010
- Jim Finigan, IF, 1957
- Kyle Finnegan, P, 2025–present
- Happy Finneran, P, 1918
- Bill Fischer, P, 1958, 1960–1961
- Carl Fischer, P, 1933–1935
- Ed Fisher, P, 1902
- Fritz Fisher, P, 1964
- Doug Fister, P, 2011–2013
- Ira Flagstead, OF, 1917–1923
- Jack Flaherty, P, 2024, 2025–present
- John Flaherty, C, 1994–1996
- Les Fleming, IF, 1939
- Scott Fletcher, IF, 1995
- Tom Fletcher, P, 1962
- Van Fletcher, P, 1955
- Bryce Florie, P, 1997–1999
- Ben Flowers, P, 1955
- Bubba Floyd, IF, 1944
- Doug Flynn, IF, 1985
- Hank Foiles, C, 1960
- Jason Foley, P, 2021–2024
- Jim Foor, P, 1971–1972
- Gene Ford, P, 1905
- Casey Fossum, P, 2008
- Larry Foster, P, 1963
- Bob Fothergill, OF, 1922–1930
- Steve Foucault, P, 1977–1978
- Pete Fox, OF, 1933–1940
- Terry Fox, P, 1961–1966
- Paul Foytack, P, 1953–1963
- Ray Francis, P, 1923
- Tito Francona, OF, 1958
- Moe Franklin, IF, 1941–1942
- Jeff Frazier, OF, 2010
- Vic Frazier, P, 1933–1934
- Bill Freehan, C, 1961–1976
- George Freese, IF, 1953
- Luke French, P, 2009
- Cy Fried, P, 1920
- Owen Friend, IF, 1953
- Emil Frisk, OF, 1901
- Bill Froats, P, 1955
- Travis Fryman, IF, 1990–1997
- Woodie Fryman, P, 1972–1974
- Charlie Fuchs, P, 1942
- Tito Fuentes, IF, 1977
- Frank Fuller, IF, 1915–1916
- Carson Fulmer, P, 2020
- Michael Fulmer, P, 2016–2018, 2020–2022
- Liz Funk, OF, 1930
- Kyle Funkhouser, P, 2020–2021
- Charlie Furbush, P, 2011

== G ==
- Matt Gage, P, 2025
- Chick Gagnon, IF, 1922
- Eddie Gaillard, P, 1997
- Del Gainer, IF, 1909–1914
- Dan Gakeler, P, 1991
- Armando Galarraga, P, 2008–2010
- Doug Gallagher, P, 1962
- Chick Galloway, IF, 1928
- John Gamble, IF, 1972–1973
- Bárbaro Garbey, IF, 1984–1985
- Alex Garbowski, PH, 1952
- Avisaíl García, OF, 2012–2013
- Bryan Garcia, P, 2019–2021
- Freddy García, P, 2008
- Karim García, OF, 1999–2000
- Luis García, IF, 1999
- Pedro García, IF, 1976
- Rony García, P, 2020–2022
- Mike Gardiner, P, 1993–1995
- Dustin Garneau, C, 2021–2022
- Reed Garrett, P, 2019
- Ned Garver, P, 1952–1956
- **Charlie Gehringer**, IF, 1924–1942
- Charlie Gelbert, IF, 1937
- Rufe Gentry, P, 1943–1948
- Mike Gerber, OF, 2018
- Franklyn Germán, P, 2002–2006
- Dick Gernert, IF, 1960–1961
- Doc Gessler, OF, 1903
- Tony Giarratano, IF, 2005
- Frank Gibson, C, 1913
- Kirk Gibson, OF, 1979–1987, 1993–1995
- Paul Gibson, P, 1988–1991
- Sam Gibson, P, 1926–1928
- Floyd Giebell, P, 1939–1941
- Bill Gilbreth, P, 1971–1972
- George Gill, P, 1937–1939
- Bob Gillespie, P, 1944
- Joe Ginsberg, C, 1948–1953
- Matt Ginter, P, 2005
- Sawyer Gipson-Long, P, 2023
- Dan Gladden, OF, 1992–1993
- Fred Gladding, P, 1961–1967
- John Glaiser, P, 1920
- Norman Glaser, P, 1920
- Kid Gleason, IF, 1901–1902
- Jerry Don Gleaton, P, 1990–1991
- Gary Glover, P, 2008
- Ed Glynn, P, 1975–1978
- Greg Gohr, P, 1993–1996
- Izzy Goldstein, P, 1932
- Purnal Goldy, OF, 1962–1963
- Alexis Gómez, OF, 2005–2006
- Chris Gomez, IF, 1993–1996
- Dan Gonzales, OF, 1979–1980
- Álex González, IF, 2014
- Enrique González, P, 2010–2011
- Juan González, OF, 2000
- Julio González, IF, 1983
- Luis Gonzalez, OF, 1998
- Andrew Good, P, 2005
- Niko Goodrum, IF, 2018–2021
- Johnny Gorsica, P, 1940–1947
- Tom Gorzelanny, P, 2015
- Anthony Gose, OF, 2015–2016
- **Goose Goslin**, OF, 1934–1937
- Johnny Grabowski, C, 1931
- Bill Graham, P, 1966
- Skinny Graham, P, 1929
- Curtis Granderson, OF, 2004–2009
- Mark Grater, P, 1993
- Beiker Graterol, P, 1999
- Ted Gray, P, 1946–1954
- Lenny Green, OF, 1967–1968
- **Hank Greenberg**, IF, 1930–1946
- Al Greene, DH, 1979
- Paddy Greene, IF, 1903
- Riley Greene, OF, 2022–present
- Shane Greene, P, 2015–2019
- Grayson Greiner, C, 2018–2021
- Seth Greisinger, P, 1998, 2002
- Ed Gremminger, IF, 1904
- Art Griggs, IF, 1918
- Jason Grilli, P, 2005–2008
- Steve Grilli, P, 1975–1977
- Marv Grissom, P, 1949
- Steve Gromek, P, 1953–1957
- Buddy Groom, P, 1992–1995
- Robbie Grossman, OF, 2021–2022
- Johnny Groth, OF, 1946–1952, 1957–1960
- Charlie Grover, P, 1913
- Johnny Grubb, OF, 1983–1987
- Joe Grzenda, P, 1961
- Sean Guenther, P, 2024–2025
- Carlos Guillén, IF, 2004–2011
- Bill Gullickson, P, 1991–1994
- Dave Gumpert, P, 1982–1983
- César Gutiérrez, IF, 1969–1971

== H ==
- Dave Haas, P, 1991–1993
- Eric Haase, C, 2020–2023
- Sammy Hale, IF, 1920–1921
- Charley Hall, P, 1918
- Herb Hall, P, 1918
- Joe Hall, OF, 1995–1997
- Marc Hall, P, 1913–1914
- Matt Hall, P, 2018–2019
- Tom Haller, C, 1972
- Shane Halter, IF, 2000–2003
- Bob Hamelin, DH, 1997
- Earl Hamilton, P, 1916
- Jack Hamilton, P, 1964–1965
- Luke Hamlin, P, 1933–1934
- Fred Haney, IF, 1922–1925
- Brenan Hanifee, 2023–present
- Don Hankins, P, 1927
- Jack Hannahan, IF, 2006
- Jim Hannan, P, 1971
- Charlie Harding, P, 1913
- Blaine Hardy, P, 2014–2019
- Shawn Hare, OF, 1991–1992
- Pinky Hargrave, C, 1928–1930
- Dick Harley, OF, 1902
- Brian Harper, C, 1986
- George Harper, OF, 1916–1918
- Terry Harper, OF, 1987
- Denny Harriger, P, 1998
- Andy Harrington, PH, 1925
- Bob Harris, P, 1938–1939
- Bucky Harris, IF, 1929–1931
- Gail Harris, IF, 1958–1960
- Gene Harris, P, 1994
- Ned Harris, OF, 1941–1946
- Josh Harrison, IF, 2019
- Earl Harrist, P, 1953
- Geoff Hartlieb, P, 2025
- Bill Haselman, C, 1998–1999
- Fred Hatfield, IF, 1952–1956
- Clyde Hatter, P, 1935–1937
- Brad Havens, P, 1989
- Ray Hayworth, C, 1926–1938
- Bob Hazle, OF, 1958
- Bill Heath, C, 1967
- Mike Heath, C, 1986–1990
- Richie Hebner, IF, 1980–1982
- Don Heffner, IF, 1944
- Jim Hegan, C, 1958
- **Harry Heilmann**, OF, 1914–1929
- Don Heinkel, P, 1988
- Mike Henneman, P, 1987–1995
- Les Hennessy, IF, 1913
- Oscar Henríquez, P, 2001–2003
- Dwayne Henry, P, 1995
- Roy Henshaw, P, 1942–1944
- Ray Herbert, P, 1950–1954
- Babe Herman, OF, 1937
- Carlos Hernández, P, 2025
- Fernando Hernández, P, 1997
- Willie Hernández, P, 1984–1989
- Larry Herndon, OF, 1982–1988
- Art Herring, P, 1929–1933
- **Whitey Herzog**, OF, 1963
- Mike Hessman, IF, 2007
- Gus Hetling, IF, 1906
- Codi Heuer, P, 2025
- Phil Hiatt, IF, 1996
- Brewer Hicklen, OF, 2025
- Charlie Hickman, IF, 1904–1905
- Buddy Hicks, IF, 1956
- John Hicks, C, 2016–2019
- Pinky Higgins, IF, 1939–1944, 1946
- Bobby Higginson, OF, 1995–2005
- Ed High, P, 1901
- Hugh High, OF, 1913–1914
- Erik Hiljus, P, 1999–2000
- Derek Hill, OF, 2020–2022
- Garrett Hill, P, 2022–2023
- John Hiller, P, 1965–1980
- A. J. Hinch, C, 2003
- Billy Hitchcock, IF, 1942–1946, 1953
- Billy Hoeft, P, 1952–1959
- Elon Hogsett, P, 1929–1936, 1944
- Bryan Holaday, C, 2012–2015, 2017
- Fred Holdsworth, P, 1972–1974
- Derek Holland, P, 2021
- Michael Hollimon, IF, 2008–2009
- Carl Holling, P, 1921–1922
- Ken Holloway, P, 1922–1928
- Shawn Holman, P, 1989
- Ducky Holmes, OF, 1901–1902
- Chris Holt, P, 2000–2001
- Vern Holtgrave, P, 1965
- Tyler Holton, P, 2023–present
- Kevin Hooper, IF, 2005–2006
- Joe Hoover, IF, 1943–1945
- Johnny Hopp, OF, 1952
- Bailey Horn, P, 2025–present
- Willie Horton, OF, 1963–1977
- Tim Hosley, C, 1970–1971
- Gene Host, P, 1956
- Chuck Hostetler, OF, 1944–1945
- Frank House, C, 1950–1957, 1961
- Fred House, P, 1913
- Art Houtteman, P, 1945–1953
- Frank Howard, OF, 1972–1973
- **Waite Hoyt**, P, 1930–1931
- Clarence Huber, IF, 1920–1921
- Charles Hudson, P, 1989
- Frank Huelsman, OF, 1904
- Aubrey Huff, IF, 2009
- Tom Hughes, OF, 1930
- Mark Huismann, P, 1988
- Terry Humphrey, C, 1975
- Bob Humphreys, P, 1962
- Brian L. Hunter, OF, 1996–1999
- Torii Hunter, OF, 2013–2014
- Jimmy Hurst, OF, 1997
- Brant Hurter, P, 2024–present
- Fred Hutchinson, P, 1939–1953
- Drew Hutchison, P, 2021–2022
- Tim Hyers, IF, 1996

== I ==
- Andy Ibáñez, IF, 2023–2025
- José Iglesias, IF, 2013, 2015–2018
- Gary Ignasiak, P, 1973
- Pete Incaviglia, OF, 1991, 1998
- Omar Infante, IF, 2002–2007, 2012–2013
- Brandon Inge, IF, 2001–2012
- Riccardo Ingram, OF, 1994
- Ed Irvin, IF, 1912
- Mike Ivie, IF, 1982–1983

== J ==
- Austin Jackson, OF, 2010–2014
- Damian Jackson, IF, 2002
- Edwin Jackson, P, 2009
- Herb Jackson, P, 1905
- Luke Jackson, P. 2025
- Ron Jackson, IF, 1981
- Ryan Jackson, IF, 2000–2002
- Baby Doll Jacobson, OF, 1915
- Charlie Jaeger, P, 1904
- Art James, OF, 1975
- Bill James, P, 1915–1919
- Bob James, P, 1982–1983
- Kevin Jarvis, P, 1997
- Paul Jata, IF, 1972
- Myles Jaye, P, 2017
- Gregg Jefferies, IF, 1999–2000
- **Hughie Jennings**, IF, 1907–1918
- Marcus Jensen, C, 1997–1998
- Willie Jensen, P, 1912
- Eduardo Jiménez, P, 2019
- Jason Jiménez, P, 2002
- Joe Jiménez, P, 2017–2022
- Jackson Jobe, P, 2024–present
- Augie Johns, P, 1926–1927
- Alex Johnson, OF, 1976
- Brian Johnson, C, 1996–1997
- Dave Johnson, P, 1993
- Earl Johnson, P, 1951
- Howard Johnson, IF, 1982–1984
- Jason Johnson, P, 2004–2005
- Jim Johnson, P, 2014
- Ken Johnson, P, 1952
- Mark Johnson, P, 2000
- Roy Johnson, OF, 1929–1932
- Syl Johnson, P, 1922–1925
- Alex Jones, P, 1903
- Bob Jones, IF, 1917–1925
- Dalton Jones, IF, 1970–1972
- Davy Jones, OF, 1906–1912
- Deacon Jones, P, 1916–1918
- Elijah Jones, P, 1907–1909
- JaCoby Jones, IF, 2016–2021
- Jacque Jones, OF, 2008
- Jahmai Jones, OF, 2025—2026
- Ken Jones, P, 1924
- Lynn Jones, OF, 1979–1983
- Ruppert Jones, OF, 1984
- Sam Jones, P, 1962
- Todd Jones, P, 1997–2001, 2006–2008
- Tom Jones, IF, 1909–1910
- Tracy Jones, OF, 1989–1990
- Milt Jordan, P, 1953
- Matt Joyce, OF, 2008
- Corey Julks, OF, 2026–present
- Jace Jung, IF, 2024–present
- Jair Jurrjens, P, 2007
- Walt Justis, P, 1905

== K ==
- Tommy Kahnle, P, 2025
- Jeff Kaiser, P, 1991
- **Al Kaline**, OF, 1953–1974
- Rudy Kallio, P, 1918–1919
- Harry Kane, P, 1903
- Gabe Kapler, OF, 1998–1999
- Jason Karnuth, P, 2005
- Marty Kavanagh, IF, 1914–1916, 1918
- Greg Keagle, P, 1996–1998
- Colt Keith, IF, 2024–present
- **George Kell**, IF, 1946–1952
- Mick Kelleher, IF, 1981–1982
- Kris Keller, P, 2002
- Charlie Keller, OF, 1950–1951
- Bryan Kelly, P, 1986–1987
- Carson Kelly, C, 2023–2024
- Don Kelly, OF 2009–2014
- Steve Kemp, OF, 1977–1981
- Bob Kennedy, OF, 1956
- Buddy Kennedy, IF, 2024
- Vern Kennedy, P, 1938–1939
- Logan Kensing, P, 2016
- Russ Kerns, PH, 1945
- John Kerr, IF, 1923–1924
- Masao Kida, P, 1999–2000
- John Kiely, P, 1991–1993
- Mike Kilkenny, P, 1969–1972
- Red Killefer, OF, 1907–1909
- Ed Killian, P, 1904–1910
- Bruce Kimm, C, 1976–1977
- Chad Kimsey, P, 1936
- Chick King, OF, 1954–1956
- Eric King, P, 1986–1988, 1992
- Gene Kingsale, OF, 2003
- Tyler Kinley, P, 2026–present
- Dennis Kinney, P, 1981
- Ian Kinsler, IF, 2014–2017
- Matt Kinzer, P, 1990
- Jay Kirke, OF, 1910
- Rube Kisinger, P, 1902–1903
- Frank Kitson, P, 1903–1905
- Danny Klassen, IF, 2003
- Al Klawitter, P, 1913
- Ron Kline, P, 1961–1962
- Johnny Klippstein, P, 1967
- Corey Knebel, P, 2014
- Rudy Kneisch, P, 1926
- Ray Knight, IF, 1988
- Gary Knotts, P, 2003–2004
- John Knox, IF, 1972–1975
- Kurt Knudsen, P, 1992–1994
- Guido Knudson, P, 2015
- Alan Koch, P, 1963–1964
- Brad Kocher, C, 1912
- Mark Koenig, IF, 1930–1931
- Don Kolloway, IF, 1949–1952
- Howie Koplitz, P, 1961–1962
- George Korince, P, 1966–1967
- Frank Kostro, IF, 1962–1963
- Pete Kozma, IF, 2018
- Marc Krauss, IF, 2015
- Ryan Kreidler, IF, 2022–2025
- Wayne Krenchicki, IF, 1983
- Chuck Kress, IF, 1954
- Red Kress, IF, 1939–1940
- Lou Kretlow, P, 1946–1949
- Chad Kreuter, C, 1992–1994
- Ian Krol, P, 2014–2015, 2021
- Bill Krueger, P, 1993–1994
- Dick Kryhoski, IF, 1950–1951
- Harvey Kuenn, OF, 1952–1959
- Rusty Kuntz, OF, 1984–1985

== L ==
- Chet Laabs, OF, 1937–1939
- Clem Labine, P, 1960
- Jairo Labourt, P, 2017
- Ed Lafitte, P, 1909–1912
- Mike Laga, IF, 1982–1986
- Lerrin LaGrow, P, 1970–1975
- Gerald Laird, C, 2009–2010, 2012
- Eddie Lake, IF, 1946–1950
- Joe Lake, P, 1912–1913
- Al Lakeman, C, 1954
- Chris Lambert, P, 2008–2009
- Gene Lamont, C, 1970–1975
- Les Lancaster, P, 1992
- Jim Landis, OF, 1967
- Marvin Lane, OF, 1971–1976
- Alex Lange, P, 2021–2025
- Dave LaPoint, P, 1986
- Jeff Larish, IF, 2008–2010
- Steve Larkin, P, 1934
- Frank Lary, P, 1954–1964
- Fred Lasher, P, 1967–1970
- Chick Lathers, IF, 1910–1911
- Charley Lau, C, 1956–1959
- Derek Law, P, 2022
- Bill Lawrence, OF, 1932
- Roxie Lawson, P, 1933–1939
- Bill Laxton, P, 1976
- Jack Lazorko, P, 1986
- Rick Leach, OF, 1981–1983
- Razor Ledbetter, P, 1915
- Wilfredo Ledezma, P, 2003–2007
- Chase Lee, P, 2025
- Don Lee, P, 1957–1958
- Hao-Yu Lee, IF, 2026-Present
- Ron LeFlore, OF, 1974–1979
- Bill Leinhauser, OF, 1912
- Mark Leiter, P, 1991–1994
- Bill Lelivelt, P, 1909–1910
- Dave Lemanczyk, P, 1973–1976
- Chet Lemon, OF, 1982–1990
- Don Lenhardt, OF, 1952
- Jim Lentine, OF, 1980
- Arcenio León, P, 2017
- Dutch Leonard, P, 1919–1925
- Ted Lepcio, IF, 1959
- Pete LePine, OF, 1902
- George Lerchen, OF, 1952
- Don Leshnock, P, 1972
- Josh Lester, IF, 2022
- Al Levine, P, 2004
- Artie Lewicki, P, 2017–2018
- Colby Lewis, P, 2006
- Mark Lewis, IF, 1995–1996
- Richie Lewis, P, 1996
- José Lima, P, 1993–1996, 2001–2002
- Em Lindbeck, PH, 1960
- Jim Lindeman, OF, 1990
- Chris Lindsay, IF, 1905–1906
- Rod Lindsey, OF, 1998–2002
- Carl Linhart, PH, 1952
- Andre Lipcius, IF, 2023
- Johnny Lipon, IF, 1942–1952
- Felipe Lira, P, 1995–1997, 1999
- Francisco Liriano, P, 2018
- Dick Littlefield, P, 1952
- Jack Lively, P, 1911
- Scott Livingstone, IF, 1991–1994
- Kyle Lobstein, P, 2014–2015
- Harry Lochhead, IF, 1901
- Bob Logan, P, 1937
- Nook Logan, OF, 2004–2006
- Zach Logue, P, 2023
- Mickey Lolich, P, 1963–1975
- George Lombard, OF, 2002
- Herman Long, IF, 1903
- Aurelio López, P, 1979–1985
- Aquilino López, P, 2007–2008
- Lefty Lorenzen, P, 1913
- Michael Lorenzen, P, 2023
- Art Loudell, P, 1910
- Baldy Louden, IF, 1912–1913
- Shane Loux, P, 2002–2003
- Slim Love, P, 1919–1920
- Torey Lovullo, IF, 1988–1989
- Grover Lowdermilk, P, 1915–1916
- Bobby Lowe, IF, 1904–1907
- Mark Lowe, P, 2016
- Dwight Lowry, C, 1984–1987
- Easton Lucas, P, 2024
- Willie Ludolph, P, 1924
- Dawel Lugo, IF, 2018–2020
- Urbano Lugo, P, 1990
- Jerry Lumpe, IF, 1964–1967
- Don Lund, OF, 1949–1954
- Scott Lusader, OF, 1987–1990
- Billy Lush, OF, 1903
- Fred Lynn, OF, 1988–1989
- Red Lynn, P, 1939
- Brandon Lyon, P, 2009

== M ==
- Duke Maas, P, 1955–1957
- Frank MacCormack, P, 1976
- Rob MacDonald, P, 1993
- Dixon Machado, IF, 2015–2018
- Dave Machemer, IF, 1979
- José Macías, IF, 1999–2002
- Morris Madden, P, 1987
- Ty Madden, P, 2024, 2026–present
- Elliott Maddox, OF, 1970
- Dave Madison, P, 1952–1953
- Scotti Madison, IF, 1985–1986
- Bill Madlock, IF, 1987
- Bligh Madris, 1B, 2024
- Kenta Maeda, P, 2024–2025
- Wendell Magee, OF, 2000–2002
- Billy Maharg, IF, 1912
- Mickey Mahler, P, 1985
- Mikie Mahtook, OF, 2017–2019
- Bob Maier, IF, 1945
- Alex Main, P, 1914
- George Maisel, OF, 1916
- Tom Makowski, P, 1975
- Ben Malgeri, OF, 2026-present
- Justyn-Henry Malloy, OF, 2024–2025
- Herm Malloy, P, 1907–1908
- Harry Malmberg, IF, 1955
- Hal Manders, P, 1941–1942, 1946
- Vincent Maney, IF, 1912
- Clyde Manion, C, 1920–1927
- Phil Mankowski, IF, 1976–1979
- Matt Manning, P, 2021–2024
- Joe Mantiply, P, 2016
- Jeff Manto, IF, 1998
- Jerry Manuel, IF, 1975–1976
- **Heinie Manush**, OF, 1923–1927
- Cliff Mapes, OF, 1952
- Firpo Marberry, P, 1933–1935
- Leo Marentette, P, 1965
- Manuel Margot, OF, 2025
- Jake Marisnick, OF, 2023
- Dick Marlowe, P, 1951–1956
- Mike Maroth, P, 2002–2007
- Buck Marrow, P, 1932
- Mike Marshall, P, 1967
- Jefry Marté, IF, 2015
- Luis Marte, P, 2011–2012
- Billy Martin, IF, 1958
- John Martin, P, 1983
- Leonys Martín, OF, 2018
- J. D. Martinez, OF, 2014–2017
- Ramón Martínez, IF, 2005
- Víctor Martínez, DH, 2011–2018
- Roger Mason, P, 1984
- Walt Masterson, P, 1956
- Tom Matchick, IF, 1967–1969
- **Eddie Mathews**, IF, 1967–1968
- Nick Maton, UT, 2023
- Bob Mavis, -, 1949
- Brian Maxcy, P, 1995–1996
- Charlie Maxwell, OF, 1955–1962
- Milt May, C, 1976–1979
- Cameron Maybin, OF, 2007, 2016, 2020
- Eddie Mayo, IF, 1944–1948
- Nomar Mazara, OF, 2021
- Sport McAllister, OF, 1901–1903
- Zach McAllister, P, 2018
- Dick McAuliffe, IF, 1960–1973
- Macay McBride, P, 2007
- James McCann, C, 2014–2018
- Arch McCarthy, P, 1902
- Barney McCosky, OF, 1939–1946
- Benny McCoy, IF, 1938–1939
- Pat McCoy, P, 2014
- Ed McCreery, P, 1914
- Lance McCullers, P, 1990
- Jeff McCurry, P, 1996
- Mickey McDermott, P, 1958
- Red McDermott, OF, 1912
- Allen McDill, P, 2000
- John McDonald, IF, 2005
- Orlando McFarlane, C, 1966
- Jim McGarr, IF, 1912
- Dan McGarvey, OF, 1912
- Casey McGehee, IF, 2016
- Pat McGehee, P, 1912
- Kevin McGonigle, IF, 2026-present
- Deacon McGuire, C, 1902–1903, 1912
- John McHale, IF, 1943–1948
- Matty McIntyre, OF, 1904–1910
- Archie McKain, P, 1939–1941
- David McKay, P, 2019–2020
- Red McKee, C, 1913–1916
- Zach McKinstry, UT, 2023–present
- Denny McLain, P, 1963–1970
- Pat McLaughlin, P, 1937, 1945
- Wayne McLeland, P, 1951–1952
- Sam McMackin, P, 1902
- Don McMahon, P, 1968–1969
- Frank McManus, C, 1904
- Marty McManus, IF, 1927–1931
- Billy McMillon, OF, 2000–2001
- Fred McMullin, IF, 1914
- Carl McNabb, PH, 1945
- Eric McNair, IF, 1941–1942
- Norm McRae, P, 1969–1970
- Bill McTigue, P, 1916
- Rusty Meacham, P, 1991
- Austin Meadows, OF, 2022–2023
- Parker Meadows, OF, 2023–present
- Chris Mears, P, 2003
- Phil Meeler, P, 1972
- Troy Melton, P, 2025–present
- Mitch Meluskey, C, 2002
- Bob Melvin, C, 1985
- Orlando Mercado, C, 1987
- Melvin Mercedes, P, 2014
- Jordy Mercer, IF, 2019–2020
- Win Mercer, P, 1902
- Herm Merritt, IF, 1921
- José Mesa, P, 2007
- Scat Metha, IF, 1940
- Charlie Metro, OF, 1943–1944
- Dan Meyer, IF, 1974–1976
- Dutch Meyer, IF, 1940–1942
- Dan Miceli, P, 1997
- Gene Michael, IF, 1975
- Jim Middleton, P, 1921
- Ed Mierkowicz, OF, 1945–1948
- Andrew Miller, P, 2006–2007
- Bob Miller, P, 1953–1956
- Bob Miller, P, 1973
- Eddie Miller, OF, 1982
- Hack Miller, C, 1944–1945
- Justin Miller, P, 2014
- Matt Miller, P, 2001–2002
- Orlando Miller, IF, 1997
- Roscoe Miller, P, 1901–1902
- Shelby Miller, P, 2024
- Trever Miller, P, 1996
- Zach Miner, P, 2006–2009
- Anthony Misiewicz, P, 2023
- Clarence Mitchell, P, 1911
- Willie Mitchell, P, 1916–1919
- Casey Mize, P, 2020–2022, 2024–2026
- Dave Mlicki, P, 1999–2001
- Brian Moehler, P, 1996–2002
- Herb Moford, P, 1958
- John Mohardt, OF, 1922
- Bob Molinaro, OF, 1975, 1977, 1983
- Dustin Molleken, P, 2016
- Bill Monbouquette, P, 1966–1967
- Sid Monge, P, 1984
- Craig Monroe, OF, 2002–2007
- Manny Montejo, P, 1961
- Keider Montero, P, 2024–present
- Rafael Montero, P, 2025
- Anse Moore, OF, 1946
- Bill Moore, P, 1925
- Jackie Moore, C, 1965
- Matt Moore, P, 2019
- Mike Moore, P, 1993–1995
- Roy Moore, P, 1922–1923
- Jake Mooty, P, 1944
- Jerry Morales, OF, 1979
- Harry Moran, P, 1912
- Keith Moreland, OF, 1989
- Chet Morgan, OF, 1935–1938
- Tom Morgan, P, 1958–1960
- George Moriarty, IF, 1909–1915
- Hal Morris, IF, 2000
- **Jack Morris**, P, 1977–1990
- Warren Morris, IF, 2003
- Bill Morrisette, P, 1920
- Jim Morrison, IF, 1987–1988
- Bubba Morton, OF, 1961–1963
- Charlie Morton, P, 2025
- Lloyd Moseby, OF, 1990–1991
- Jerry Moses, C, 1974
- John Moses, OF, 1991
- Don Mossi, P, 1959–1963
- Steven Moya, OF, 2014–2016
- Les Mueller, P, 1941–1945
- Edward Mujica, P, 2017
- Billy Mullen, IF, 1926
- George Mullin, P, 1902–1913
- Pat Mullin, OF, 1940–1953
- Mike Munoz, P, 1991–1993
- Eric Munson, IF, 2000–2004
- Dwayne Murphy, OF, 1988
- John Murphy, IF, 1903
- Heath Murray, P, 2001
- Glenn Myatt, C, 1936
- Mike Myers, P, 1995–1997

== N ==
- Russ Nagelson, OF, 1970
- Bill Nahorodny, C, 1983
- Kid Nance, OF, 1901
- Ray Narleski, P, 1959
- Joe Nathan, P, 2014–2015
- Efren Navarro, IF, 2017
- Julio Navarro, P, 1964–1966
- Bots Nekola, P, 1933
- Lynn Nelson, P, 1940
- Ángel Nesbitt, P, 2015
- Jack Ness, IF, 1911
- Jim Nettles, OF, 1974
- Johnny Neun, IF, 1925–1928
- Phil Nevin, IF, 1995–1997
- Tyler Nevin, IF, 2023
- **Hal Newhouser**, P, 1939–1953
- Bobo Newsom, P, 1939–1941
- Fu-Te Ni, P, 2009–2010
- Simon Nicholls, IF, 1903
- Fred Nicholson, OF, 1917
- Tomás Nido, C, 2025
- Joe Niekro, P, 1970–1972
- Bob Nieman, OF, 1953–1954
- Melvin Nieves, OF, 1996–1997
- Ron Nischwitz, P, 1961–1962, 1965
- C. J. Nitkowski, P, 1995–1996, 1999–2001
- Matt Nokes, C, 1986–1990
- Dickie Noles, P, 1987
- Hideo Nomo, P, 2000
- Daniel Norris, P, 2015–2021, 2022
- Lou North, P, 1913
- Jim Northrup, OF, 1964–1974
- Greg Norton, IF, 2004
- Randy Nosek, P, 1989–1990
- Iván Nova, P, 2020
- Roberto Novoa, P, 2004
- Edwin Núñez, P, 1989–1990
- Renato Núñez, IF, 2021

== O ==
- John O'Connell, IF, 1902
- Charley O'Leary, IF, 1904–1912
- Ollie O'Mara, IF, 1912
- Randy O'Neal, P, 1984–1986
- Frank O'Rourke, IF, 1924–1926
- Prince Oana, P, 1943–1945
- Ben Oglivie, OF, 1974–1977
- Frank Okrie, P, 1920
- Red Oldham, P, 1914–1922
- Omar Olivares, P, 1996–1997
- Andy Oliver, P, 2010–2011
- Joe Oliver, C, 1997–1998
- Lester Oliveros, P, 2011
- Ole Olsen, P, 1922–1923
- Gregg Olson, P, 1996
- Karl Olson, OF, 1957
- Reese Olson, P, 2023–present
- Eddie Onslow, IF, 1912–1913
- Jack Onslow, C, 1912
- Magglio Ordóñez, OF, 2005–2011
- Joe Orengo, IF, 1944
- Joe Orrell, P, 1943–1945
- José Ortega, P, 2012–2014
- Bobo Osborne, IF, 1957–1962
- Jimmy Outlaw, OF, 1943–1949
- James Outman, OF, 2026
- Stubby Overmire, P, 1943–1949
- Frank Owen, P, 1901
- Marv Owen, IF, 1931–1937
- Tyler Owens, P, 2025
- Ray Oyler, IF, 1965–1968

== P ==
- John Pacella, P, 1986
- Chris Paddack, P, 2025
- Phil Page, P, 1928–1930
- David Palmer, P, 1989
- Dean Palmer, IF, 1999–2003
- José Paniagua, P, 2002
- Stan Papi, IF, 1980–1981
- Craig Paquette, IF, 2002–2003
- Isaac Paredes, IF, 2020–2021
- Johnny Paredes, IF, 1990–1991
- Mark Parent, C, 1996
- Clay Parker, P, 1990
- Salty Parker, IF, 1936
- Slicker Parks, P, 1921
- Bobby Parnell, P, 2016
- Lance Parrish, C, 1977–1986
- Dixie Parsons, C, 1939–1943
- Steve Partenheimer, IF, 1913
- Johnny Pasek, C, 1933
- Larry Pashnick, P, 1982–1983
- Bob Patrick, OF, 1941–1942
- Danny Patterson, P, 2000–2004
- Daryl Patterson, P, 1968–1971
- Jarrod Patterson, IF, 2001
- David Pauley, P, 2011
- Fred Payne, C, 1906–1908
- Terry Pearson, P, 2002
- Marv Peasley, P, 1910
- John Peck, 2026–present
- Al Pedrique, IF, 1989
- Mike Pelfrey, P, 2016
- Rudy Pemberton, OF, 1995
- Brayan Peña, C, 2013
- Carlos Peña, IF, 2002–2006
- Orlando Peña, P, 1965–1967
- Ramón Peña, P, 1989
- Shannon Penn, DH, 1995–1996
- Brad Penny, P, 2011
- Gene Pentz, P, 1975
- Pepper Peploski, IF, 1913
- Don Pepper, IF, 1966
- Jhonny Peralta, IF, 2010–2013
- Wily Peralta, P, 2021–2022
- Troy Percival, P, 2005
- Hernán Pérez, IF, 2012–2015
- Neifi Pérez, IF, 2006–2007
- Timo Pérez, OF, 2007
- Wenceel Pérez, IF, 2024–present
- Matt Perisho, P, 2001–2002
- Cy Perkins, C, 1934
- Hub Pernoll, P, 1910–1912
- Ron Perranoski, P, 1971–1972
- Pol Perritt, P, 1921
- Boyd Perry, IF, 1941
- Clay Perry, IF, 1908
- Hank Perry, OF, 1912
- Jim Perry, P, 1973
- Ryan Perry, P, 2009–2011
- Johnny Pesky, IF, 1952–1954
- John Peters, C, 1915
- Rick Peters, OF, 1979–1981
- Dustin Peterson, OF, 2019
- Ben Petrick, C, 2003
- Dan Petry, P, 1979–1987, 1990–1991
- Gary Pettis, OF, 1988–1989, 1992
- Adam Pettyjohn, P, 2001
- Dave Philley, OF, 1957
- Bubba Phillips, IF, 1955, 1963–1964
- Eddie Phillips, C, 1929
- Jack Phillips, IF, 1955–1957
- Red Phillips, P, 1934–1936
- Tony Phillips, OF, 1990–1994
- Billy Pierce, P, 1945–1948
- Jack Pierce, IF, 1975
- Tony Piet, IF, 1938
- Herman Pillette, P, 1922–1924
- Luis Pineda, P, 2001
- Michael Pineda, P, 2022
- Babe Pinelli, IF, 1920
- Wally Pipp, IF, 1913
- Cotton Pippen, P, 1939–1940
- Chris Pittaro, IF, 1985
- Al Platte, OF, 1913
- Johnny Podres, P, 1966–1967
- Boots Poffenberger, P, 1937–1938
- Plácido Polanco, IF, 2005–2009
- Luis Polonia, OF, 1998–2000
- Jim Poole, P, 1999–2000
- Rick Porcello, P, 2009–2014
- Jay Porter, C, 1955–1957
- Lew Post, OF, 1902
- Brian Powell, P, 1998–1999, 2002
- Ray Powell, OF, 1913
- Ted Power, P, 1988
- Del Pratt, IF, 1923–1924
- Joe Presko, P, 1957–1958
- Alex Presley, OF, 2016–2017
- David Price, P, 2014–2015
- Jim Price, C, 1967–1971
- Jerry Priddy, IF, 1950–1953
- Curtis Pride, OF, 1996–1997
- Jim Proctor, P, 1959
- Augie Prudhomme, P, 1929
- Tim Pugh, P, 1997
- David Purcey, P, 2011
- Billy Purtell, IF, 1914
- Luke Putkonen, P, 2012–2014
- Ed Putman, C, 1979

== Q ==
- George Quellich, OF, 1931

== R ==
- Mike Rabelo, C, 2006–2007
- Ryan Raburn, OF, 2004, 2007–2012
- Dick Radatz, P, 1969
- Rip Radcliff, OF, 1941–1943
- Tanner Rainey, P, 2025–2026
- Ed Rakow, P, 1964–1965
- Erasmo Ramírez, P, 2021
- Nick Ramirez, P, 2019–2020
- Wilkin Ramírez, OF, 2009
- Wilson Ramos, C, 2021
- Joe Randa, IF, 1998
- Clay Rapada, P, 2007–2009
- Earl Rapp, OF, 1949
- Jim Ray, P, 1974
- Robbie Ray, P, 2014
- Bugs Raymond, P, 1904
- Mark Redman, P, 2001–2002
- Wayne Redmond, OF, 1965–1969
- Bob Reed, P, 1969–1970
- Evan Reed, P, 2013–2014
- Jody Reed, IF, 1997
- Rich Reese, IF, 1973
- Phil Regan, P, 1960–1965
- Frank Reiber, C, 1933–1936
- Zac Reininger, P, 2017–2019
- Alex Remneas, P, 1912
- Erwin Renfer, P, 1913
- Tony Rensa, C, 1930
- Édgar Rentería, IF, 2008
- Víctor Reyes, OF, 2018–2022
- Bob Reynolds, P, 1975
- Ross Reynolds, P, 1914–1915
- Billy Rhiel, IF, 1932–1933
- Will Rhymes, IF, 2010–2011
- Dennis Ribant, P, 1968
- Harry Rice, OF, 1928–1930
- Paul Richards, C, 1943–1946
- Nolen Richardson, IF, 1929–1932
- Rob Richie, OF, 1989
- Hank Riebe, C, 1942–1949
- Topper Rigney, IF, 1922–1925
- Juan Rincón, P, 2009
- Danny Rios, P, 2000
- Billy Ripken, IF, 1998
- Kevin Ritz, P, 1989–1992
- Mike Rivera, C, 2001–2002
- Mike Roarke, C, 1961–1964
- Bruce Robbins, P, 1979–1980
- Bip Roberts, IF, 1998
- Dave Roberts, P, 1976–1977
- Leon Roberts, OF, 1974–1975
- Willis Roberts, P, 1999–2000
- Jerry Robertson, P, 1970
- Nate Robertson, P, 2003–2009
- Aaron Robinson, C, 1949–1951
- Eddie Robinson, IF, 1957
- Jeff Robinson, P, 1987–1990
- Rabbit Robinson, IF, 1904
- Jacob Robson, OF, 2021
- Fernando Rodney, P, 2002–2003, 2005–2009
- Aurelio Rodríguez, IF, 1971–1979
- Eduardo Rodríguez, P, 2022–2023
- Elvin Rodríguez, P, 2022
- Francisco Rodríguez, P, 2016–2017
- **Iván Rodríguez**, C, 2004–2008
- Ronny Rodríguez, IF, 2018–2019
- Steve Rodriguez, IF, 1995
- Joe Rogalski, P, 1938
- Billy Rogell, IF, 1930–1939
- Jake Rogers, C, 2019, 2021, 2023–2026
- Kenny Rogers, P, 2006–2008
- Saul Rogovin, P, 1949–1951
- Mel Rojas, P, 1999
- Bill Roman, IF, 1964–1965
- Ed Romero, IF, 1990
- Andrew Romine, IF, 2014–2017
- Austin Romine, C, 2020
- Henri Rondeau, OF, 1913
- Bruce Rondón, P, 2013, 2015–2017
- Matt Roney, P, 2003
- Jim Rooker, P, 1968
- Trevor Rosenthal, P, 2019
- Cody Ross, OF, 2003
- Don Ross, IF, 1938, 1942–1945
- Tyson Ross, P, 2019
- Claude Rossman, IF, 1907–1909
- Larry Rothschild, P, 1981–1982
- Jack Rowan, P, 1906
- Schoolboy Rowe, P, 1933–1942
- Rich Rowland, C, 1990–1993
- Dave Rozema, P, 1977–1984
- Art Ruble, OF, 1927
- Dave Rucker, P, 1981–1983
- Muddy Ruel, C, 1931–1932
- Chance Ruffin, P, 2011
- Vern Ruhle, P, 1974–1977
- Sean Runyan, P, 1998–2000
- Jack Russell, P, 1937
- Dusty Ryan, C, 2008–2009
- Kyle Ryan, P, 2014–2017
- River Ryan, P, 2026–present

== S ==
- Erik Sabel, P, 2002
- A. J. Sager, P, 1996–1998
- Mark Salas, C, 1990–1991
- Luis Salazar, IF, 1988
- Oscar Salazar, IF, 2002
- Jarrod Saltalamacchia, C, 2016, 2018
- Ron Samford, IF, 1955–1957
- Bryan Sammons, P, 2024
- Juan Samuel, IF, 1994–1995
- Joe Samuels, P, 1930
- Alejandro Sánchez, OF, 1985
- Alex Sánchez, OF, 2003–2004
- Aníbal Sánchez, P, 2012–2017
- Reggie Sanders, IF, 1974
- Scott Sanders, P, 1997–1998
- Julio Santana, P, 2002
- Marino Santana, P, 1998
- Pedro Santana, IF, 2001
- Ramón Santiago, IF, 2002–2003, 2006–2013
- Omir Santos, C, 2011–2012
- Víctor Santos, P, 2001
- Dane Sardinha, C, 2008–2009
- Joe Sargent, IF, 1921
- Kevin Saucier, P, 1981–1982
- Dennis Saunders, P, 1970
- Warwick Saupold, P, 2016–2018
- Jay Sborz, P, 2010
- Bob Scanlan, P, 1996
- Ray Scarborough, P, 1953
- Germany Schaefer, IF, 1905–1909
- Biff Schaller, OF, 1911
- Wally Schang, C, 1931
- Dan Schatzeder, P, 1980–1981
- Frank Scheibeck, IF, 1906
- Fred Scherman, P, 1969–1973
- Bill Scherrer, P, 1984–1986
- Max Scherzer, P, 2010–2014
- Lou Schiappacasse, OF, 1902
- Daniel Schlereth, P, 2010–2012
- Brian Schmack, P, 2003–2004
- Boss Schmidt, C, 1906–1911
- Jonathan Schoop, IF, 2020–2023
- John Schreiber, P, 2019–2020
- Rick Schu, IF, 1989
- Heinie Schuble, IF, 1929–1935
- Barney Schultz, P, 1959
- Bob Schultz, P, 1955
- Mike Schwabe, P, 1989–1990
- Chuck Scrivener, IF, 1975–1977
- Connor Seabold, P, 2026
- Johnnie Seale, P, 1964–1965
- Steve Searcy, P, 1988–1991
- Andrew Sears, P, 2026–present
- Tom Seats, P, 1940
- Bobby Seay, P, 2006–2009
- Frank Secory, OF, 1940
- Chuck Seelbach, P, 1971–1974
- Ray Semproch, P, 1960
- Paul Sewald, P, 2025
- Rip Sewell, P, 1932
- Dick Sharon, OF, 1973–1974
- Al Shaw, C, 1901
- Bob Shaw, P, 1957–1958
- Merv Shea, C, 1927–1929, 1939
- Larry Sheets, DH, 1990
- Gary Sheffield, OF, 2007–2008
- John Shelby, OF, 1990–1991
- Hugh Shelley, OF, 1935
- Chris Shelton, IF, 2004–2006
- Pat Sheridan, OF, 1986–1989
- Larry Sherry, P, 1964–1967
- Jimmy Shevlin, IF, 1930
- Ivey Shiver, OF, 1931
- Ron Shoop, C, 1959
- Zack Short, IF, 2021–2023, 2026
- Chick Shorten, OF, 1919–1921
- Chasen Shreve, P, 2023
- Joe Siddall, C, 1998–1999
- Rubén Sierra, OF, 1996
- Ed Siever, P, 1901–1902, 1906–1908
- Frank Sigafoos, IF, 1929
- **Al Simmons**, OF, 1936
- Hack Simmons, IF, 1910
- Nelson Simmons, OF, 1984–1985
- Alfredo Simón, P, 2015
- Randall Simon, IF, 2001–2002
- Duke Sims, C, 1972–1973
- Matt Sinatro, C, 1989
- Duane Singleton, OF, 1996
- Dave Sisler, P, 1959–1960
- Scott Sizemore, IF, 2010–2011
- Dave Skeels, P, 1910
- Lou Skizas, OF, 1958
- John Skopec, P, 1903
- Tarik Skubal, P, 2020–2026
- Jim Slaton, P, 1978, 1986
- Bill Slayback, P, 1972–1974
- Lou Sleater, P, 1957–1958
- Jim Small, OF, 1955–1957
- Bob Smith, P, 1959
- Burch Smith, P, 2026–present
- Chad Smith, P, 2014
- Clay Smith, P, 1940
- Dylan Smith, P, 2025
- George Smith, P, 1926–1929
- George Smith, IF, 1963–1965
- Heinie Smith, IF, 1903
- Jack Smith, IF, 1912
- Jason Smith, IF, 2004–2005
- Rufus Smith, P, 1927
- Willie Smith, OF, 1963
- Josh Smoker, P, 2018
- Drew Smyly, P, 2012–2014
- Nate Snell, P, 1987
- Clint Sodowsky, P, 1995–1996
- Nick Solak, PR, 2023
- Drew Sommers, P, 2025–present
- Joakim Soria, P, 2014–2015
- Vic Sorrell, P, 1928–1937
- Elías Sosa, P, 1982
- Gregory Soto, P, 2019–2022
- Steve Souchock, OF, 1951–1955
- Steve Sparks, P, 2000–2003
- Joe Sparma, P, 1964–1969
- Kid Speer, P, 1909
- George Spencer, P, 1958–1960
- Tubby Spencer, C, 1916–1918
- Charlie Spikes, OF, 1978
- Harry Spilman, IF, 1986
- Chris Spurling, P, 2003, 2005–2006
- Max St. Pierre, C, 2010
- Tuck Stainback, OF, 1940–1941
- Matt Stairs, OF, 2006
- Gerry Staley, P, 1961
- Oscar Stanage, C, 1909–1925
- Mickey Stanley, OF, 1964–1978
- Joe Staton, IF, 1972–1973
- Rusty Staub, OF, 1976–1979
- Bill Steen, P, 1915
- Dave Stegman, OF, 1978–1980
- Ben Steiner, IF, 1947
- Todd Steverson, OF, 1995
- Christin Stewart, OF, 2018–2020
- Lefty Stewart, P, 1921
- Phil Stidham, P, 1994
- Bob Stoddard, P, 1985
- John Stone, OF, 1928–1933
- Lil Stoner, P, 1922–1929
- Jesse Stovall, P, 1904
- Mike Strahler, P, 1973
- Bob Strampe, P, 1972
- Doug Strange, IF, 1989
- Walt Streuli, C, 1954–1956
- Sailor Stroud, P, 1910
- Marlin Stuart, P, 1949–1952
- Franklin Stubbs, IF, 1995
- Jim Stump, P, 1957–1959
- Daniel Stumpf, P, 2017–2019
- Tom Sturdivant, P, 1963
- Eugenio Suárez, IF, 2014
- Joe Sugden, C, 1912
- George Suggs, P, 1908–1909
- Billy Sullivan, C, 1916
- Billy Sullivan, Jr., C, 1940–1941
- Charlie Sullivan, P, 1928–1931
- Jackie Sullivan, IF, 1944
- Joe Sullivan, P, 1935–1936
- John Sullivan, C, 1905
- John Sullivan, C, 1963–1965
- Russ Sullivan, OF, 1951–1953
- Champ Summers, OF, 1979–1981
- Ed Summers, P, 1908–1912
- George Susce, P, 1958–1959
- George Susce, C, 1932
- Gary Sutherland, IF, 1974–1976
- Suds Sutherland, P, 1921
- Bill Sweeney, IF, 1928
- Trey Sweeney, IF, 2024–2025
- Bob Swift, C, 1944–1953
- Bob Sykes, P, 1977–1978
- Ken Szotkiewicz, IF, 1970

== T ==
- Frank Tanana, P, 1985–1992
- Jordan Tata, P, 2006–2008
- Jackie Tavener, IF, 1921–1928
- Ben Taylor, IF, 1952
- Bill Taylor, OF, 1957–1958
- Bruce Taylor, P, 1977–1979
- Gary Taylor, P, 1969
- Tony Taylor, IF, 1971–1973
- Wiley Taylor, P, 1911
- Birdie Tebbetts, C, 1936–1947
- Julio Teherán, P, 2021
- Walt Terrell, P, 1985–1988, 1990–1992
- John Terry, P, 1902
- Mickey Tettleton, C, 1991–1994
- Marcus Thames, OF, 2004–2009
- Brad Thomas, P, 2010–2011
- Clete Thomas, OF, 2008–2012
- Frosty Thomas, P, 1905
- Bud Thomas, P, 1939–1941
- George Thomas, OF, 1957–1961, 1963–1965
- Ira Thomas, C, 1908
- Jason Thompson, IF, 1976–1980
- Justin Thompson, P, 1996–1999
- **Sam Thompson**, OF, 1906
- Tim Thompson, C, 1958
- Gary Thurman, OF, 1993
- Mark Thurmond, P, 1986–1987
- Tom Timmermann, P, 1969–1973
- Ron Tingley, C, 1995
- Dave Tobik, P, 1978–1982
- Jim Tobin, P, 1945
- Kevin Tolar, P, 2000–2001
- Tim Tolman, OF, 1986–1987
- Andy Tomberlin, OF, 1998
- Earl Torgeson, IF, 1955–1957
- Spencer Torkelson, IF, 2022–present
- Andrés Torres, OF, 2002–2004
- Carlos Torres, P, 2019
- Gleyber Torres, IF, 2025–present
- Dick Tracewski, IF, 1966–1969
- **Alan Trammell**, IF, 1977–1996
- Bubba Trammell, OF, 1997
- Allan Travers, P, 1912
- Tom Tresh, OF, 1969
- Matt Treanor, C, 2009
- Gus Triandos, C, 1963
- Dizzy Trout, P, 1939–1952
- Bun Troy, P, 1912
- Chris Truby, IF, 2002
- Virgil Trucks, P, 1941–1952, 1956
- Mike Trujillo, P, 1988–1989
- John Tsitouris, P, 1957
- Matt Tuiasosopo, OF, 2013
- Spencer Turnbull, P, 2018–2021, 2023
- Jacob Turner, P, 2011–2012, 2018
- Jerry Turner, OF, 1982
- Bill Tuttle, OF, 1952–1957
- Guy Tutwiler, aka "King Tut", IF, 1911–1913

== U ==
- Bob Uhl, P, 1940
- George Uhle, P, 1929–1933
- Jerry Ujdur, P, 1980–1983
- Pat Underwood, P, 1979–1983
- Al Unser, C, 1942–1944
- Justin Upton, OF, 2016–2017
- Tom Urbani, P, 1996
- Ugueth Urbina, P, 2004–2005
- Lino Urdaneta, P, 2004
- José Ureña, P, 2021
- José Urquidy, P, 2025
- Gio Urshela, IF, 2024

== V ==
- José Valdez, P, 2015–2016
- Eduardo Valencia, C, 2026–present
- Vito Valentinetti, P, 1958
- José Valverde, P, 2010–2013
- Andy Van Hekken, P, 2002–2004
- Todd Van Poppel, P, 1996
- Ricky Vanasco, P, 2024, 2026
- Elam Vangilder, P, 1928–1929
- Andrew Vasquez, P, 2023
- Virgil Vasquez, P, 2006–2007
- Bobby Veach, OF, 1912–1923
- Coot Veal, IF, 1958–1960, 1963
- Lou Vedder, P, 1920
- José Veras, P, 2013
- Randy Veres, P, 1996
- Drew VerHagen, P, 2014–2019
- Justin Verlander, P, 2005–2017, 2026
- Tom Veryzer, IF, 1973–1977
- Will Vest, P, 2022–present
- George Vico, IF, 1948–1949
- Matt Vierling, OF, 2023–present
- Ryan Vilade, OF, 2024
- Brandon Villafuerte, P, 2000
- Brayan Villarreal, P, 2011–2013
- Fernando Viña, IF, 2004
- Ozzie Virgil, IF, 1958–1961
- Ossie Vitt, IF, 1912–1918

== W ==
- Jake Wade, P, 1936–1938
- Hal Wagner, C, 1947–1948
- Mark Wagner, IF, 1976–1980
- Jacob Waguespack, P, 2026–present
- Dick Wakefield, OF, 1941–1949
- Chris Wakeland, OF, 2001
- Matt Walbeck, C, 1996–1997, 2002–2003
- Jim Walewander, IF, 1987–1988
- Dixie Walker, OF, 1938–1939
- Frank Walker, OF, 1917–1918
- Gee Walker, OF, 1931–1937
- Hub Walker, OF, 1931, 1935, 1945
- Jamie Walker, P, 2002–2006
- Luke Walker, P, 1974
- Mike Walker, P, 1996
- Tom Walker, P, 1975
- Jim Walkup, P, 1927
- Jim Walkup, P, 1939
- Jim Walsh, P, 1921
- Steve Wapnick, P, 1990
- Gary Ward, OF, 1989–1990
- Hap Ward, OF, 1912
- Jon Warden, P, 1968
- Jack Warner, IF, 1925–1928
- John Warner, C, 1905–1906
- Jarrod Washburn, P, 2009
- Johnny Watson, IF, 1930
- Jeff Weaver, P, 1999–2002
- Jim Weaver, OF, 1985
- Roger Weaver, P, 1980
- Earl Webb, OF, 1932–1933
- Skeeter Webb, IF, 1945–1947
- Thad Weber, P, 2012
- Herm Wehmeier, P, 1958
- Dick Weik, P, 1953–1954
- Robbie Weinhardt, P, 2010–2011
- Milt Welch, C, 1945
- Joey Wentz, P, 2022–2024
- Casper Wells, OF, 2010–2011
- David Wells, P, 1993–1995
- Ed Wells, P, 1923–1927
- Don Wert, IF, 1963–1970
- Vic Wertz, OF, 1947–1952, 1961–1963
- Charlie Wheatley, P, 1912
- Kevin Whelan, P, 2014
- Jack Whillock, P, 1971
- Lou Whitaker, IF, 1977–1995
- Brendan White, P, 2023
- Derrick White, IF, 1995
- Hal White, P, 1941–1952
- Jo-Jo White, OF, 1932–1938
- Rondell White, OF, 2004–2005
- Earl Whitehill, P, 1923–1932
- Sean Whiteside, P, 1995
- Kevin Wickander, P, 1995
- Dave Wickersham, P, 1964–1967
- Jimmy Wiggs, P, 1905–1906
- Bill Wight, P, 1952–1953
- Milt Wilcox, P, 1977–1985
- Adam Wilk, P, 2011–2012
- Ed Willett, P, 1906–1913
- Brian Williams, P, 1996
- Eddie Williams, IF, 1996
- Frank Williams, P, 1989
- Johnnie Williams, P, 1914
- Kenny Williams, OF, 1989–1990
- Lefty Williams, P, 1913–1914
- Carl Willis, P, 1984
- Dontrelle Willis, P, 2008–2010
- Alex Wilson, P, 2015–2018
- Bobby Wilson, C, 2016, 2019
- Earl Wilson, P, 1966–1970
- George F. Wilson, C, 1911
- Glenn Wilson, OF, 1982–1983
- Icehouse Wilson, PH, 1934
- Jack Wilson, P, 1942
- Josh Wilson, IF, 2015
- Justin Wilson, P, 2016–2017
- Mutt Wilson, P, 1920
- Red Wilson, C, 1954–1960
- Vance Wilson, C, 2005–2006
- Walter Wilson, P, 1945
- Trey Wingenter, P, 2023
- Al Wingo, OF, 1924–1928
- George Winter, P, 1908
- Casey Wise, IF, 1960
- Hughie Wise, C, 1930
- Kevin Witt, DH, 2003
- John Wockenfuss, C, 1974–1983
- Pete Wojey, P, 1956–1957
- Randy Wolf, P, 2015
- Bob Wood, C, 1904–1905
- Jake Wood, IF, 1961–1967
- Jason Wood, IF, 1998–1999
- Joe Wood, IF, 1943
- Larry Woodall, C, 1920–1929
- Hal Woodeshick, P, 1956, 1961
- Ron Woods, OF, 1969
- Mark Woodyard, P, 2005–2006
- Gage Workman, IF, 2026
- Ralph Works, P, 1909–1912
- Tim Worrell, P, 1998
- Danny Worth, OF, 2010–2014
- Yats Wuestling, IF, 1929–1930
- John Wyatt, P, 1968
- Whit Wyatt, P, 1929–1933

== Y ==
- Esteban Yan, P, 2004
- Emil Yde, P, 1929
- Joe Yeager, IF, 1901–1903
- Archie Yelle, C, 1917–1919
- Tom Yewcic, C, 1957
- Rudy York, IF, 1934–1945
- Eddie Yost, IF, 1959–1960
- Delmon Young, OF, 2011–2012
- Dmitri Young, OF, 2002–2006
- Ernie Young, OF, 2003
- John Young, IF, 1971
- Matt Young, OF, 2012
- Kip Young, P, 1978–1979
- Ralph Young, IF, 1915–1921

== Z ==
- Chris Zachary, P, 1972
- Carl Zamloch, P, 1913
- Bill Zepp, P, 1971
- Gus Zernial, OF, 1958–1959
- Jordan Zimmermann, P, 2016–2020
- Joel Zumaya, P, 2006–2011
- George Zuverink, P, 1954–1955

== See also ==
- Detroit Tigers Nicknames: colorful nicknames from the Tigers past and present
- List of Detroit Tigers broadcasters
- Managers and ownership of the Detroit Tigers
- {{Detroit Tigers roster}}
- {{Detroit Tigers roster navbox}}
