= 1920 Detroit Tigers season =

Major League Baseball season

1920 Detroit Tigers
- League: American League
- Ballpark: Navin Field
- City: Detroit
- Record: 61–93 (.396)
- League place: 7th
- Owners: Frank Navin
- Managers: Hughie Jennings

The 1920 Detroit Tigers season was the franchise's 19th season in Major League Baseball. The team finished 7th in the American League with a record of 61–93, 37 games behind the Cleveland Indians.

The 1920 Tigers started the season 0–13, setting the dubious record of having the longest losing streak to start a season.

The record stood for 68 years until it was broken by the 1988 Baltimore Orioles, who shattered the mark by losing their first 21 games.

== Regular season ==
=== Season standings ===
American League
Team	W	L	Pct.	GB	Home	Road
Cleveland Indians	98	56	.636	—	51‍–‍27	47‍–‍29
Chicago White Sox	96	58	.623	2	52‍–‍25	44‍–‍33
New York Yankees	95	59	.617	3	49‍–‍28	46‍–‍31
St. Louis Browns	76	77	.497	21½	40‍–‍38	36‍–‍39
Boston Red Sox	72	81	.471	25½	41‍–‍35	31‍–‍46
Washington Senators	68	84	.447	29	37‍–‍38	31‍–‍46
Detroit Tigers	61	93	.396	37	32‍–‍46	29‍–‍47
Philadelphia Athletics	48	106	.312	50	25‍–‍50	23‍–‍56

=== Record vs. opponents ===
1920 American League record Sources:
Team	BOS	CWS	CLE	DET	NYY	PHA	SLB	WSH
Boston	—	12–10	6–16	13–9	9–13	13–9–1	9–13	10–11
Chicago	10–12	—	10–12	19–3	10–12	16–6	14–8	17–5
Cleveland	16–6	12–10	—	15–7	9–13	16–6	15–7	15–7
Detroit	9–13	3–19	7–15	—	7–15	12–10–1	10–12	13–9
New York	13–9	12–10	13–9	15–7	—	19–3	12–10	11–11
Philadelphia	9–13–1	6–16	6–16	10–12–1	3–19	—	8–14	6–16
St. Louis	13–9	8–14	7–15	12–10	10–12	14–8	—	12–9–1
Washington	11–10	5–17	7–15	9–13	11–11	16–6	9–12–1	—

=== Roster ===
1920 Detroit Tigers
Roster
Pitchers: Ernie Alten; Doc Ayers; Harry Baumgartner; John Bogart; Bernie Boland; Allen Conkwright; Jack Coombs; Red Cox; Roy Crumpler; Hooks Dauss; Howard Ehmke; Cy Fried; John Glaiser; Norman Glaser; Dutch Leonard; Slim Love; Bill Morrisette; Frank Okrie; Red Oldham; Lou Vedder; Mutt Wilson	Catchers: Eddie Ainsmith; Clyde Manion; Oscar Stanage; Larry Woodall; Infielders: Donie Bush; Davey Claire; Babe Ellison; Sammy Hale; Harry Heilmann; Clarence Huber; Bob Jones; Babe Pinelli; Ralph Young	Outfielders: Ty Cobb; Ira Flagstead; Chick Shorten; Bobby Veach	Manager: Hughie Jennings; Coaches: Jack Coombs

== Player stats ==
=== Batting ===
==== Starters by position ====
Note: Pos = Position; G = Games played; AB = At bats; H = Hits; Avg. = Batting average; HR = Home runs; RBI = Runs batted in

Pos	Player	G	AB	H	Avg.	HR	RBI
C	Oscar Stanage	78	238	55	.231	0	17
1B	Harry Heilmann	145	543	168	.309	9	89
2B	Ralph Young	150	594	173	.291	0	33
SS	Donie Bush	141	506	133	.263	1	33
3B	Babe Pinelli	102	284	65	.229	0	21
OF	Chick Shorten	116	364	105	.288	1	40
OF	Ty Cobb	112	428	143	.334	2	63
OF	Bobby Veach	154	612	188	.307	11	113

==== Other batters ====
Note: G = Games played; AB = At bats; H = Hits; Avg. = Batting average; HR = Home runs; RBI = Runs batted in

Player	G	AB	H	Avg.	HR	RBI
Ira Flagstead	110	311	73	.235	3	35
Bob Jones	81	265	66	.249	1	18
Eddie Ainsmith	69	186	43	.231	1	19
Babe Ellison	61	155	34	.219	0	21
Sammy Hale	76	116	34	.293	1	14
Clyde Manion	32	80	22	.275	0	8
Larry Woodall	18	49	12	.245	0	5
Clarence Huber	11	42	9	.214	0	5
Davey Claire	3	7	1	.143	0	0

=== Pitching ===
==== Starting pitchers ====
Note: G = Games pitched; IP = Innings pitched; W = Wins; L = Losses; ERA = Earned run average; SO = Strikeouts

Player	G	IP	W	L	ERA	SO
Hooks Dauss	38	270.1	13	21	3.56	82
Howard Ehmke	38	268.1	15	18	3.25	98
Dutch Leonard	28	191.1	10	17	4.33	76
Roy Crumpler	2	13.0	1	0	5.54	2

==== Other pitchers ====
Note: G = Games pitched; IP = Innings pitched; W = Wins; L = Losses; ERA = Earned run average; SO = Strikeouts

Player	G	IP	W	L	ERA	SO
Red Oldham	39	215.1	8	13	3.85	62
Doc Ayers	46	208.2	7	14	3.88	103
Bill Morrisette	8	27.0	1	1	4.33	15
John Bogart	4	23.2	2	1	3.04	5
Allen Conkwright	5	19.1	2	1	6.98	4
Bernie Boland	4	17.1	0	2	7.79	4
John Glaiser	8	14.2	0	0	4.91	2
Mutt Wilson	3	13.0	1	1	3.46	4

==== Relief pitchers ====
Note: G = Games pitched; W = Wins; L = Losses; SV = Saves; ERA = Earned run average; SO = Strikeouts

Player	G	W	L	SV	ERA	SO
Frank Okrie	21	1	2	0	5.27	9
Ernie Alten	14	0	1	0	9.00	4
Harry Baumgartner	9	0	1	0	4.00	7
Red Cox	3	0	0	0	5.40	1
Jack Coombs	2	0	0	0	3.18	1
Cy Fried	2	0	0	0	16.20	0
Slim Love	1	0	0	0	8.31	2
Norman Glaser	1	0	0	0	15.43	1
Lou Vedder	1	0	0	0	0.00	1

== Farm system ==
- Class B: Fort Worth Panthers (Texas League; Jake Atz, manager) — LEAGUE CHAMPION
