= Partenheimer =

Partenheimer is a surname. Notable people with the surname include:

- Hal Partenheimer (born 1956), American soccer player
- Jürgen Partenheimer (born 1947), German artist
- Stan Partenheimer (1922–1989), American baseball pitcher
- Steve Partenheimer (1891–1971), American baseball player
