= Schiappacasse =

Schiappacasse (Italian pronunciation: [skjappaˈkasse]; Ligurian: Scciappacasce) is an Italian surname from Liguria, literally translating to 'box-wrecker'. Notable people with this surname include:

- Nicolás Schiappacasse (born 1999), Uruguayan professional football forward
- Lou Schiappacasse (1881–1910), American professional baseball player
