= Len Okrie =

American baseball player (1923–2018)

- Catcher
- Born: July 16, 1923; Detroit, Michigan, U.S.
- Died: April 12, 2018 (aged 94); Hope Mills, North Carolina, U.S.
- Batted: Right Threw: Right

MLB debut
- June 16, 1948, for the Washington Senators

Last MLB appearance
- April 16, 1952, for the Boston Red Sox

MLB statistics
- Batting average: .218
- Hits: 17
- Runs batted in: 3
- Stats at Baseball Reference

Teams
- Washington Senators (1948, 1950–1951); Boston Red Sox (1952)

Leonard Joseph Okrie (July 16, 1923 – April 12, 2018) was an American catcher and coach in Major League Baseball. Born in Detroit, Okrie stood 6 ft 2 in (188 cm) tall, weighed 185 pounds (84 kg), and batted and threw right-handed.

== Career as player and MLB coach ==
Okrie's playing career stretched from 1942 through 1957, with three seasons (1943–45) missed due to World War II service in the United States Navy. Drafted by the Washington Senators out of the Chicago Cubs farm system in November 1947, Okrie would spend only one full season (1950) in the Major Leagues as Washington's third-string catcher (behind Al Evans and Mickey Grasso). He spent parts of the 1948 and 1951 campaigns with Washington, and appeared in one game for the 1952 Boston Red Sox. Overall, Okrie appeared in 42 games, with 78 at bats, 17 hits, no home runs, three runs batted in, and a .218 batting average.

He managed in the Boston farm system from 1954 to 1960 and in 1963, and was the Red Sox' Major League bullpen coach in 1961–62 and 1965–66. He then joined his hometown Detroit Tigers as a minor league manager (1967–69, 1971–74) and MLB bullpen coach (1970). His career record as a minor league manager was 912 wins, and 1,013 defeats (.474). Okrie won one league pennant, in the Appalachian League during his maiden season as a skipper.

His father, Frank, a left-handed pitcher, appeared in 21 games for the 1920 Tigers and two brothers played minor league baseball. Okrie died in April 2018 at the age of 94.

== See also ==
- List of second-generation Major League Baseball players

Preceded by Mickey Owen (1956); Al Lakeman	Boston Red Sox Bullpen Coach; 1961–1962; 1965–1966	Succeeded by Al Lakeman; Al Lakeman
Preceded by Hal Naragon	Detroit Tigers Bullpen Coach; 1970	Succeeded by Charlie Silvera
