= Hal Partenheimer =

American soccer player

Personal information
- Date of birth: May 12, 1956 (age 70)
- Place of birth: Latrobe, Pennsylvania, U.S.
- Position: Defender

College career
Years	Team	Apps	(Gls)
- James Madison Dukes

Senior career*
Years	Team	Apps	(Gls)
1979	Detroit Express	0	(0)
1979–1980	Detroit Express (indoor)	3	(0)
1980, 1981–1982	Pittsburgh Spirit (indoor)	41	(1)
1983	Pennsylvania Stoners		
- * Club domestic league appearances and goals

Hal Partenheimer (born May 12, 1956) is an American retired soccer midfielder who spent one season in the North American Soccer League and two in the Major Indoor Soccer League.

The son of Stan Partenheimer, and grandson of Steve Partenheimer, Hal Partenheimer graduated from Sewickley Academy in 1974. He is a member of the Sewickley Athletic Hall of Fame. Partenheimer attended James Madison University where he played on the men's soccer team. In 1979, he signed with the Detroit Express of the North American Soccer League, but saw no first team time during the outdoor season. He played three games during the 1979-1980 indoor season before being sent to the Pittsburgh Spirit for cash. He finished the season with the Spirit, then spent a year not playing soccer after the Spirit went into hiatus. In the fall of 1981, he was among the first players re-signed by the Spirit when they resumed operations. In 1983, he played for the Pennsylvania Stoners of the American Soccer League.
