= Tom Doran =

American baseball player (1880–1910)

- Catcher
- Born: December 2, 1880; Westchester County, New York, U.S.
- Died: June 22, 1910 (aged 29); New York, New York, U.S.
- Batted: Left Threw: Right

MLB debut
- April 19, 1904, for the Boston Americans

Last MLB appearance
- August 11, 1906, for the Boston Americans

MLB statistics
- Batting average: .144
- Home runs: 0
- Runs batted in: 4

Teams
- Boston Americans (1904–1905); Detroit Tigers (1905); Boston Americans (1906)

Thomas J. "Long Tom" Doran (December 2, 1880 – June 22, 1910) was an American backup catcher in Major League Baseball who played from 1904 through 1906 for the Boston Americans (1904-1905[start], 1906) and Detroit Tigers (1905[end]). Listed at 5 ft 11 in (1.80 m), 152 lb., Doran batted left-handed and threw right-handed. He was born in Westchester County, New York.

In a three-season career, Doran was a .144 hitter (19-for-132) with 10 runs, four RBI, three doubles, one triple, and three stolen bases without home runs in 51 games played.

Doran died in New York, New York, at the age of 29.

== See also ==
- Boston Red Sox all-time roster
- Detroit Tigers all-time roster

== Sources ==
- Baseball Reference
- Encyclopedia of Baseball Catchers
