= George Bullard (baseball) =

American baseball player (1928–2002)

- Shortstop/Pinch runner
- Born: October 24, 1928; Lynn, Massachusetts, U.S.
- Died: December 23, 2002 (aged 74); Lynn, Massachusetts, U.S.
- Batted: Right Threw: Right

MLB debut
- September 17, 1954, for the Detroit Tigers

Last MLB appearance
- September 25, 1954, for the Detroit Tigers

MLB statistics
- Games played: 4
- Hits: 0
- Runs scored: 0
- Stats at Baseball Reference

Teams
- Detroit Tigers (1954)

George Donald Bullard (October 24, 1928 – December 23, 2002) was an American professional baseball player. The native of Lynn, Massachusetts, was a shortstop and outfielder during a nine-season (1950–1958) career. He played 891 games in minor league baseball and received a four-game, end-of-season trial in the Major Leagues with the 1954 Detroit Tigers. He batted right-handed, stood 5 feet 9 inches (1.75 m) tall and weighed 165 pounds (75 kg).

Bullard attended Lynn Classical High School, where he was a teammate of celebrated local athlete and future MLB first baseman Harry Agganis. Bullard was recalled by Detroit after his fifth season in the team's farm system and made his debut as a pinch runner on September 17, 1954, running for Walt Dropo in the ninth inning of a 6–3 loss to the Cleveland Indians. After two more pinch running appearances, Bullard played his only game in the field (at shortstop) and recorded his only plate appearance in MLB on September 25, also against the Indians. He entered the game in the sixth inning. Defensively he handled five chances and made one error. At the plate, he recorded one at bat against Early Wynn, a future Hall of Famer. He reached first base on a force play and did not score a run.

"I replaced shortstop Harvey Kuenn in the game and I hit the ball hard and got on base," Bullard once said. "It was a big thrill to play. On the Indians that day in Cleveland was my hometown neighbor Jim Hegan, the great Indians catcher. I hurt my hand in the game and was shipped back to Boston for treatment and missed the chance at playing in more games that late September."

Bullard played another four season in the Tigers and Milwaukee Braves organizations before leaving baseball in 1958.
