= Red Cox =

American baseball player (1895–1984)

- Pitcher
- Born: February 16, 1895; Laurel Springs, North Carolina
- Died: October 15, 1984 (aged 89); Roanoke, Virginia
- Batted: Left Threw: Right

MLB debut
- April 17, 1920, for the Detroit Tigers

Last MLB appearance
- May 1, 1920, for the Detroit Tigers

MLB statistics
- Win–loss record: 0–0
- Strikeouts: 1
- Earned run average: 5.40
- Stats at Baseball Reference

Teams
- Detroit Tigers (1920)

Plateau Preston Rex "Red" Cox (February 16, 1895 – October 15, 1984) was an American professional baseball player who pitched one season in Major League Baseball, appearing in three games for the 1920 Detroit Tigers of the American League. In five innings pitched, he allowed three earned runs, three bases on balls, and struck out one batter.

In addition to his major league experience, he played four seasons of minor league baseball, from 1920 to 1923, the last of which was for the Birmingham Barons of the Southern Association. He died at the age of 89 in Roanoke, Virginia, and is interred at Mountain View Cemetery in Vinton, Virginia.
