= Frank Okrie =

American baseball player (1896–1959)

- Pitcher
- Born: October 27, 1896; Detroit, Michigan, U.S.
- Died: October 16, 1959 (aged 62); Detroit, Michigan, U.S.
- Batted: Left Threw: Left

MLB debut
- April 18, 1920, for the Detroit Tigers

Last MLB appearance
- August 4, 1920, for the Detroit Tigers

MLB statistics
- Win–loss record: 1–2
- Earned run average: 5.27
- Strikeouts: 9
- Stats at Baseball Reference

Teams
- Detroit Tigers (1920)

Frank Anthony Okrie (October 27, 1896 – October 16, 1959), nicknamed "Lefty", was an American Major League Baseball (MLB) pitcher.

Okrie appeared in 21 games for the 1920 Detroit Tigers, recording a 1-2 win–loss record with a 5.27 earned run average.

Okrie was the father of MLB catcher and coach Len Okrie.
