= Al Lakeman =

American baseball player (1918–1976)

- Catcher
- Born: December 31, 1918; Cincinnati, Ohio, U.S.
- Died: May 25, 1976 (aged 57); Spartanburg, South Carolina, U.S.
- Batted: Right Threw: Right

MLB debut
- April 19, 1942, for the Cincinnati Reds

Last MLB appearance
- May 23, 1954, for the Detroit Tigers

MLB statistics
- Batting average: .203
- Home runs: 15
- Runs batted in: 66
- Stats at Baseball Reference

Teams
- Cincinnati Reds (1942–1947); Philadelphia Phillies (1947–1948); Boston Braves (1949); Detroit Tigers (1954)

Albert Wesley Lakeman (December 31, 1918 – May 25, 1976), nicknamed "Moose", was an American professional baseball catcher. He played in Major League Baseball for the Cincinnati Reds, Philadelphia Phillies, Boston Braves and Detroit Tigers. Lakeman was listed at 6 feet 2 inches (1.88 m) tall and 195 pounds (88 kg). He was born in Cincinnati, Ohio.

The light-hitting Lakeman was considered a fine defensive catcher by the public as he took responsibility for getting the most out of his pitchers. For most of his nine-year career in the Majors, he was an efficient, reliable backup playing behind Ray Mueller (Reds) and Andy Seminick (Phillies). His most productive season came in 1945 with Cincinnati, when he posted career-highs in games played (76, including 72 games as starting backstop as the Reds' most-used catcher), batting average (.256), home runs (eight), RBI (31) and runs (22).

In a nine-season career, Lakeman was a .203 hitter with 131 hits, 15 home runs and 66 RBI in 239 games. After his playing career ended, he managed in the Tigers' farm system (1956–62; 1965–66; 1970) and served two terms as the bullpen coach at the Major League level for the Boston Red Sox (1963–64; 1967–69), and was a member of the 1967 American League champions.

Lakeman died in Spartanburg, South Carolina, at age 57.

Sporting positions
Preceded by Len Okrie; Len Okrie	Boston Red Sox Bullpen Coach; 1963–1964; 1967–1969	Succeeded by Len Okrie; George Thomas
