= Harry Baumgartner =

American baseball player (1892–1930)

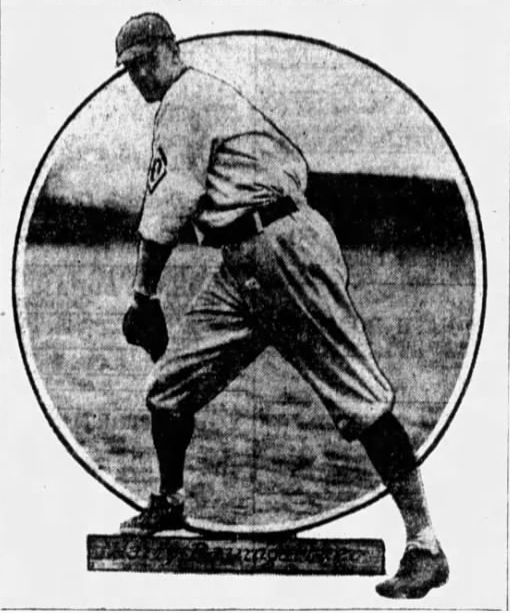
- Baumgartner with the Omaha Buffaloes in 1921
- Pitcher
- Born: October 6, 1892; South Pittsburg, Tennessee
- Died: December 3, 1930 (aged 38); Augusta, Georgia
- Batted: Left Threw: Right

MLB debut
- September 6, 1920, for the Detroit Tigers

Last MLB appearance
- October 2, 1920, for the Detroit Tigers

MLB statistics
- Win–loss record: 0–1
- Earned run average: 4.00
- Strikeouts: 7
- Stats at Baseball Reference

Teams
- Detroit Tigers (1920)

Harry Edward Baumgartner (October 6, 1892 – December 3, 1930) was an American professional baseball pitcher who played for the Detroit Tigers of Major League Baseball (MLB) in 1920. He also played in baseball's minor and independent leagues from 1915 to 1927.

== Early life and career ==
Baumgartner was born on October 6, 1892, in South Pittsburg, Tennessee. He served three years in the United States Navy and after playing baseball in the service was signed by the Norfolk Tars of the Virginia League in February 1915. He pitched for Norfolk until mid-May, when he joined the Winston-Salem Twins of the North Carolina State League. He pitched in 39 games for Winston-Salem, ending the season with a 16-16 win-loss record and 3.74 earned run average.

He remained with the Winston-Salem during spring training 1916 and pitched in the club's first game of the season on April 27, allowing two runs in 1.0 innings of relief. On April 29, he asked for and was granted his release from the Twins and signed by the Greensboro Hornets.

== Detroit Tigers ==
By 1920, Baumgartner was pitching for Clarksdale of the independent Delta League. During a July 31 game against Belzoni in which he allowed no runs and only three hits, he was noticed by Detroit Tigers scout Mike J. Flynn. After watching Baumgartner allow only hits to Charleston on August 3, Flynn signed Baumgartner to a contract, with Baumgartner scheduled to report to the major league club at the conclusion of the Delta League season.

Baumgartner made his major league debut on September 6, pitching in both games of a doubleheader against the Chicago White Sox. In game one, he allowed one hit to the four batters he faced in the eighth inning after relieving Howard Ehmke. In game two, he relieved Doc Ayers and allowed three runs and four hits while recording his first career strikeout in 2.1 innings, earning the loss. He would ultimately pitch in nine games for Detroit in September and October, allowing 18 hits in 18.0 innings and finishing the season with seven strikeouts and a 4.00 ERA.

== Return to the minor and independent leagues ==
In February 1921, Detroit transferred Baumgartner to the Omaha Buffaloes of the Western League. In July, he was placed on the injured list with a sore arm. He returned in August and ended the year with a 10–9 record in 28 games. He appeared in six games for Omaha in 1922, but by June he was pitching for an independent club in Missouri Valley, Iowa. He remained with the club in 1923 and served as the team's manager in 1923 and 1924.

In February 1925, Baumgartner was signed by the Jackson Senators of the Cotton States League. In May, The Birmingham News reported that he was released from Jackson and offered the job of managing the Laurel Lumberjacks. However, The Clarion-Ledger later reported that Baumgartner has turned down the position, and instead was sold to the Atlanta Crackers on June 3. However, he did not appear in any official league games that season. He instead moved to the Jonesboro Buffaloes, where he had 10 wins with only one loss. (Note: On Baseball-Reference.com, Baumgartner's tenure with the Jonesboro Buffaloes is listed under the name "H.M. Baumgartner," but contemporary accounts confirm the statistics are those of Harry Edward Baumgartner.) He was sold back to Jackson in February 1926, and finished the year with a 17–13 record. Baumgartner began the 1927 season with Jackson, but was released on May 11 after six games pitched. He joined the St. Augustine/Waycross Saints, going 11–10 in 37 games pitched in 1927. (Note: On Baseball-Reference.com, Baumgartner's tenure with the St. Augustine/Waycross Saints is listed simply under the name "Baumgartner," but contemporary accounts confirm the statistics are those of Harry Edward Baumgartner.) He signed with the Tampa Krewes before the 1928 season, but retired to work as an immigration inspector in Tampa, Florida.

== Death ==
Baumgartner became hospitalized in Augusta, Georgia mid-1930 before dying on December 5. He was survived by a wife and three children.
