= Lou Schiappacasse =

American baseball player (1881–1910)

- Outfielder
- Born: March 29, 1881; Ann Arbor, Michigan, US
- Died: September 20, 1910 (aged 29); Ann Arbor, Michigan, US
- Batted: Right Threw: Right

MLB debut
- September 7, 1902, for the Detroit Tigers

Last MLB appearance
- September 8, 1902, for the Detroit Tigers

MLB statistics
- Batting average: .000
- Home runs: 0
- Runs batted in: 1
- Stats at Baseball Reference

Teams
- Detroit Tigers (1902)

Louis Joseph Schiappacasse (March 29, 1881 – September 20, 1910), nicknamed "Shippy", was an American professional baseball player from 1902 to 1910. He briefly played Major League Baseball for the Detroit Tigers in September 1902. He died in 1910 at the age of 29 from typhoid fever.

== Early years ==
According to his State of Michigan death certificate, Louis Joseph Schiappacasse was born March 29, 1881, in Ann Arbor, Michigan, the son of Anton J. "Anthony" Schiappacasse and Caterina "Catherine" Schiappacasse both originally of Neirone, Italy. Lou's father, Anton, was a fruit dealer and confectioner operating from locations on Main Street in Ann Arbor, until his death on August 28, 1899, in Ann Arbor, Michigan. Lou's mother, Caterina, died on September 17, 1895, in Ann Arbor.

== Baseball career ==
=== Detroit Tigers ===
Schiappacasse played two games in Major League Baseball. Both games were for the Detroit Tigers on September 7 and 8 of 1902. In his two Major League Baseball games, he was hitless with a base on balls in six plate appearances for a .167 on-base percentage. He played right field for the Detroit Tigers; making an error on his only chance. Schiappacasse is one of the rare players with career batting averages and fielding percentages of .000. He also holds the distinction of having the longest last name (13 letters) of any player for the Detroit Tigers in their 100+ year history. (Boots Poffenberger, Steve Partenheimer, and Vito Valentinetti) are tied for 2nd with 12 letters.)

=== Minor leagues ===
During the 1903 season, Schiappacasse played third base for the Holland, Michigan, independent team.

In January 1904, he was signed by the Detroit Tigers for a spring training try-out. However, he did not play for the Detroit Tigers in 1904 and instead played for the Monroe Hill Citys in the Cotton States League. He continued thereafter to play minor league baseball for the Augusta Tourists of the South Atlantic League (1905, 1906), Birmingham Barons of the Southern Association (1905), Charleston Sea Gulls of the South Atlantic League (1907), Tecumseh in the Southern Michigan League (1908), Saginaw Wa-wahs in the Southern Michigan League (1909), and Muskegon Speed Boys of the West Michigan League (1910).

== Death ==
At the time of the 1910 U.S. Federal Census, Louis Joseph "Lou" Schiappacasse was living at 630 Main Street in Ann Arbor, Michigan, with his older sister, Teresa M Schiappacasse and younger brother, Alexander Joseph Schiappacasse.

Louis Joseph "Lou" Schiappacasse died at home on September 20, 1910, after a week-long bout of typhoid fever at the age of 29.
