= Stan Partenheimer =

American baseball player (1922–1989)

- Pitcher
- Born: October 21, 1922; Chicopee Falls, Massachusetts, U.S.
- Died: January 28, 1989 (aged 66); Wilson, North Carolina, U.S.
- Batted: Right Threw: Left

MLB debut
- May 27, 1944, for the Boston Red Sox

Last MLB appearance
- September 11, 1945, for the St. Louis Cardinals

MLB statistics
- Win–loss record: 0–0
- Earned run average: 6.91
- Strikeouts: 6
- Stats at Baseball Reference

Teams
- Boston Red Sox (1944); St. Louis Cardinals (1945)

Stanwood Wendell Partenheimer [Party] (October 21, 1922 – January 28, 1989) was an American pitcher in Major League Baseball who played for the Boston Red Sox (1944) and St. Louis Cardinals (1945). He was listed at 5 ft 11 in (1.80 m), 175 lb (79 kg) and batted right-handed and threw left-handed. He was born in Chicopee Falls, Massachusetts. His father, Steve Partenheimer, also was a major league player.

In a two-season-career, Partenheimer posted a 6.91 ERA in nine appearances, including three starts, six strikeouts, 18 walks, and 14 1/3 innings of work without a decision.

Partenheimer spent the majority of his post-MLB career at Sewickley Academy and was named to their Hall of Fame. His son, Hal, played professional soccer.

Partenheimer died in Wilson, North Carolina, at the age of 66.

== See also ==
- List of second-generation Major League Baseball players
