= Walt Streuli =

American baseball player (1935–2017)

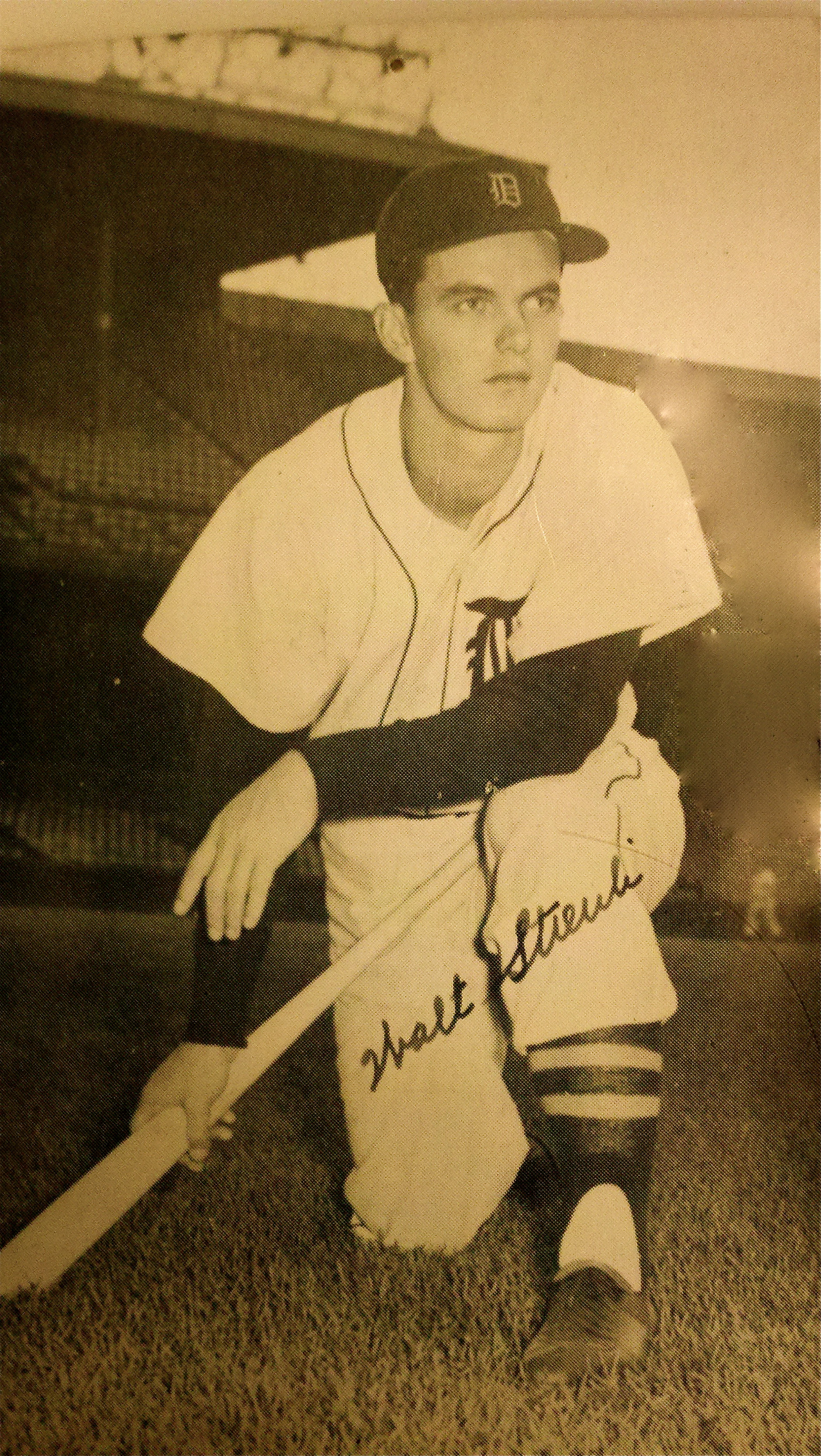
- Catcher
- Born: September 26, 1935; Memphis, Tennessee, U.S.
- Died: January 19, 2017 (aged 81); Greensboro, North Carolina, U.S.
- Batted: Right Threw: Right

MLB debut
- September 25, 1954, for the Detroit Tigers

Last MLB appearance
- May 1, 1956, for the Detroit Tigers

MLB statistics
- Batting average: .250
- Home runs: 0
- Runs batted in: 2
- Stats at Baseball Reference

Teams
- Detroit Tigers (1954–1956)

Walter Herbert Streuli (September 26, 1935 – January 19, 2017) was an American professional baseball player, a catcher who appeared in six Major League Baseball games over parts of three seasons with the 1954–56 Detroit Tigers. Streuli stood 6 feet 2 inches (1.88 m) tall, weighed 195 pounds (88 kg), and threw and batted right-handed. He was an alumnus of Southwestern College (now Rhodes College) in Memphis.

Streuli's professional career lasted for six seasons, from 1953 through 1957 with a brief return to the game in 1961. The day before his 19th birthday, in 1954, Streuli made his first MLB appearance in the penultimate game of the year, relieving Tiger catcher Red Wilson in the seventh inning of an 11–1 loss to the American League champion Cleveland Indians. He handled one chance in the field without an error and drew a base on balls against future Hall of Famer Early Wynn. He had two more cups of coffee with Detroit, playing two games in September 1955 and three more in April 1956 before he was sent back to minor league baseball at the May cutdown. In his six MLB games, Streuli batted 12 times and collected three hits, two of which were doubles.

Streuli died on January 19, 2017, in Greensboro, North Carolina at the age of 81.
