= Cy Fried =

American baseball player (1897–1970)

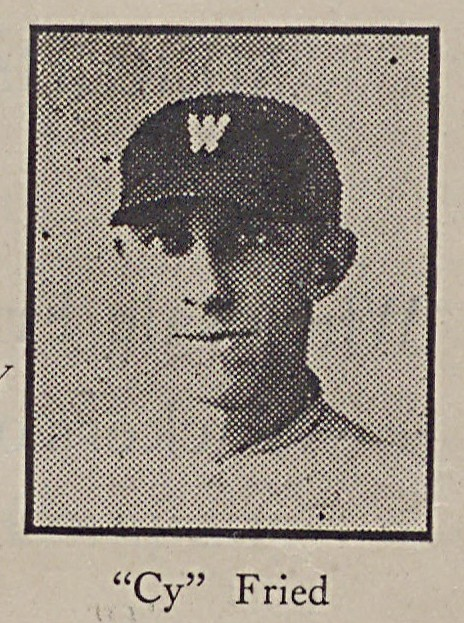
- Pitcher
- Born: July 23, 1897; San Antonio, Texas
- Died: October 9, 1970 (aged 73); San Antonio, Texas
- Batted: Left Threw: Left

MLB debut
- September 17, 1920, for the Detroit Tigers

Last MLB appearance
- September 23, 1920, for the Detroit Tigers

MLB statistics
- Games pitched: 2
- Earned run average: 16.20
- Innings pitched: 1.2
- Stats at Baseball Reference

Teams
- Detroit Tigers (1920)

Arthur Edwin "Cy" Fried (July 23, 1897 – October 9, 1970) was a Major League Baseball pitcher who played in two games for the Detroit Tigers in 1920.
