= Bernie Boland =

American baseball player (1892–1973)

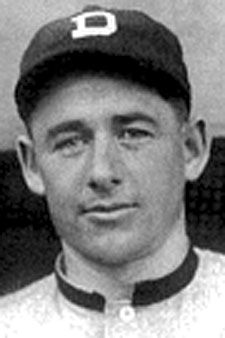
- Pitcher
- Born: January 21, 1892; Rochester, New York, U.S.
- Died: September 12, 1973 (aged 81); Detroit, Michigan, U.S.
- Batted: Right Threw: Right

MLB debut
- April 14, 1915, for the Detroit Tigers

Last MLB appearance
- June 17, 1921, for the St. Louis Browns

MLB statistics
- Win–loss record: 68–53
- Earned run average: 3.25
- Strikeouts: 364
- Stats at Baseball Reference

Teams
- Detroit Tigers (1915–1920); St. Louis Browns (1921)

Bernard Anthony Boland (January 21, 1892 – September 12, 1973) was an American baseball pitcher. He played professional baseball for 10 years from 1912 to 1921, including seven seasons in Major League Baseball with the Detroit Tigers from 1915 to 1920 and for the St. Louis Browns in 1921. Between 1915 and 1919, Boland appeared in 198 games for the Tigers, 110 as a starter and compiled a 67-47 win–loss record and a 3.01 earned run average. After suffering a broken arm, he appeared in only 11 games in 1920 and 1921 and compiled a 1–6 record with an 8.73 earned run average.

== Early years ==
Boland was born in Rochester, New York, in 1892. His older brother Pat Boland played baseball for the Blue Labels team.

== Professional baseball ==
=== Minor leagues ===
Boland began playing professional baseball in 1912 for the Akron Rubbermen of the Central League. He then spent the 1913 and 1914 seasons with the Nashville Volunteers of the Southern Association. In 1914, Boland appeared in 38 games for the Volunteers and compiled a 17–13 record with a 3.03 earned run average.

=== Detroit Tigers ===
On August 28, 1914, the Nashville club sold Boland to the Detroit Tigers. He made his major league debut on April 14, 1915, as a member of the 1915 Detroit Tigers that compiled a 100-54 for the second best winning percentage in franchise history. Boland's record in his rookie season was 13–7 with a 3.11 earned run average. On August 16, 1915, he came within four batters of throwing a no hitter, retiring the first 23 Cleveland Indians batters he faced, only to give up a lone single to Ben Paschal, a 19-year-old pinch-hitter who was making his major league debut. Paschal's hit off Boland was his only hit of the 1915 season. Boland and the Tigers went on to win the game 3–1.

In 1916, Boland appeared in a career-high 46 games, only nine as a starter, and compiled a 10–3 record with a 3.94 earned run average. His .769 winning percentage was the best in the American League.

The 1917 season may have been Boland's best. Boland appeared in 43 games, 28 as a starter, and compiled a 16–11 record with a 2.68 earned run average. On August 4, 1917, he again narrowly missed a no-hitter. Pitching against the Yankees, he did not allow a hit until the sixth inning and allowed only one hit in the game.

In 1918, Boland appeared in 29 games, 25 as a starter, and compiled a 14–10 record with a 2.65 earned run average.

In his fifth season with the Tigers, Boland started a career-high 30 games and had a career-high 18 complete games. However, he posted his first losing record at 14-16 despite a 3.04 earned run average. At the end of the 1918 season, Boland reported to the Great Lakes Naval Training Station for service in the Navy. However, World War I ended a few weeks later, and Boland was discharged from the Navy in January 1919.

Using a sharp breaking curve, Boland once struck out Babe Ruth three times in a game. Ruth opined that Boland had "one of the greatest curveballs ever pitched." H. G. Salsinger, the editor of The Detroit News for 49 years, placed Boland on his second all-time Tigers team and wrote that Boland in his prime "was reputed to have the best curveball in the league." Boland later recalled that, while they always talked about his curveball, he struck out Ruth with "fast ones, all in on his hands." He once defeated the Yankees 12 games in a row.

On September 25, 1919, Boland was the Tigers' starting pitcher in a game against Cleveland that created a scandal in 1926 after Dutch Leonard testified that Ty Cobb, Tris Speaker, Leonard and another player had met under the grandstand and agreed to "fix" the game in favor of Detroit. It was also alleged that the players had further agreed to allow players to boost their batting averages. Detroit batters had 19 hits and scored nine runs, and Cleveland batters had 13 hits and five runs off Boland. Boland gave up two triples to Speaker, and Speaker later misplayed a fly ball, giving Boland his only triple of the 1919 season. Boland denied any involvement in fixing the game and claimed in December 1926 to be the most surprised man in the world at the revelation. However, he acknowledged that there were a lot of "friendship games" at the end of a season. Boland went on to say: "The way I figure it, about one in every 300 games is crooked."

Boland broke his arm in 1919 and was never the same. In 1920, Boland was 0–2 with a 7.79 earned run average in four games and 17 1/3 innings pitched.

=== St. Louis Browns ===
In the spring of 1921, Boland's arm was still bothering him. The Tigers granted Boland an unconditional release on April 11. He was signed by the St. Louis Browns on May 7. Boland appeared in seven games for the Browns, six as a starter, and compiled a 1–4 record with a 9.33 earned run average. He appeared in his last major league game on June 17, 1921. On June 28, 1921, the Browns unconditionally released Boland.

During his seven seasons in the major leagues, Boland appeared in 209 games, 119 as a starter, with a record of 68–53 and a 3.25 earned run average.

== Family and later years ==
Boland was married on May 21, 1917, to Grace Bell Russelo. He defeated the New York Yankees the day before the wedding. After retiring from baseball, Boland worked as a cement contractor and later as a construction foreman for the Detroit Department of Public Works. He retired in 1957 and died at Detroit's Mount Carmel Hospital in 1973 following a three-week illness, aged 81. Boland was survived by two sons and two daughters.
