= Norman Glaser =

American baseball player (1894–1979)

- Pitcher
- Born: August 31, 1894; Cleveland, Ohio, U.S.
- Died: May 27, 1979 (aged 84); Parma, Ohio, U.S.
- Batted: Right Threw: Right

MLB debut
- September 21, 1920, for the Detroit Tigers

Last MLB appearance
- September 21, 1920, for the Detroit Tigers

MLB statistics
- Games pitched: 1
- Earned run average: 15.43
- Strikeouts: 1
- Stats at Baseball Reference

Teams
- Detroit Tigers (1920)

Norman Matt Glaser (August 31, 1894 – May 27, 1979) was an American Major League Baseball pitcher who played in one game for the Detroit Tigers on September 21, 1920.
