= John Bogart (baseball) =

American baseball player (1900–1986)

- Pitcher
- Born: September 21, 1900; Bloomsburg, Pennsylvania, U.S.
- Died: December 7, 1986 (aged 86); Clarence, New York, U.S.
- Batted: Right Threw: Right

MLB debut
- September 17, 1920, for the Detroit Tigers

Last MLB appearance
- October 3, 1920, for the Detroit Tigers

MLB statistics
- Win–loss record: 2–1
- Earned run average: 3.04
- Strikeouts: 5
- Stats at Baseball Reference

Teams
- Detroit Tigers (1920)

John Renzie Bogart (September 21, 1900 – December 7, 1986), nicknamed "Big John", was an American Major League Baseball (MLB) pitcher who played for the Detroit Tigers in 1920.

Bogart began pitching in an industrial league for a team based in Geneva, New York as a teenager. While playing against a semi-professional team in Rochester, he caught the attention of Louie Groh, brother of Heinie Groh, who recommended him to the Evansville club of the Three-I League. After starting the 1920 season in Evansville, his contract was purchased by the Detroit Tigers.

Bogart was only in Detroit briefly before being farmed out for further development. Bogart pitched for 16 different minor league clubs between 1920 and 1929. After his playing career, he returned to Geneva where he coached and umpired baseball.
