= Clyde Manion =

American baseball player (1896–1967)

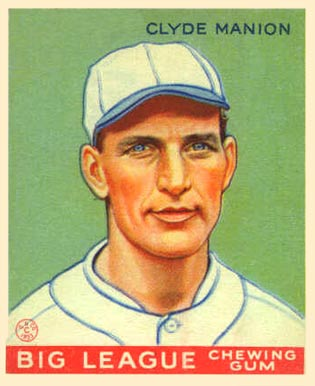
- Manion' 1933 Goudey card
- Catcher
- Born: October 30, 1896; Big River, Missouri, U.S.
- Died: September 4, 1967 (aged 70); Detroit, Michigan, U.S.
- Batted: Right Threw: Right

MLB debut
- May 5, 1920, for the Detroit Tigers

Last MLB appearance
- September 30, 1934, for the Cincinnati Reds

MLB statistics
- Batting average: .218
- Home runs: 3
- Runs batted in: 112
- Stats at Baseball Reference

Teams
- Detroit Tigers (1920–1924, 1926–1927); St. Louis Browns (1928–1930); Cincinnati Reds (1932–1934)

Clyde Jennings Manion (October 30, 1896 – September 4, 1967), nicknamed "Pete", was an American baseball catcher. He played professional baseball for 17 years from 1918 to 1934, including 13 years in Major League Baseball for the Detroit Tigers (1920–1927), St. Louis Browns (1928–1930), and Cincinnati Reds (1932–1934). He appeared in a total of 477 major league games (401 as a catcher) with a career batting average of .218 and a .293 on-base percentage. He had 250 hits, 112 RBIs, 96 runs scored, and 118 bases on balls.

== Early years ==
Manion was born in Big River, Missouri, in 1896.

== Professional baseball ==
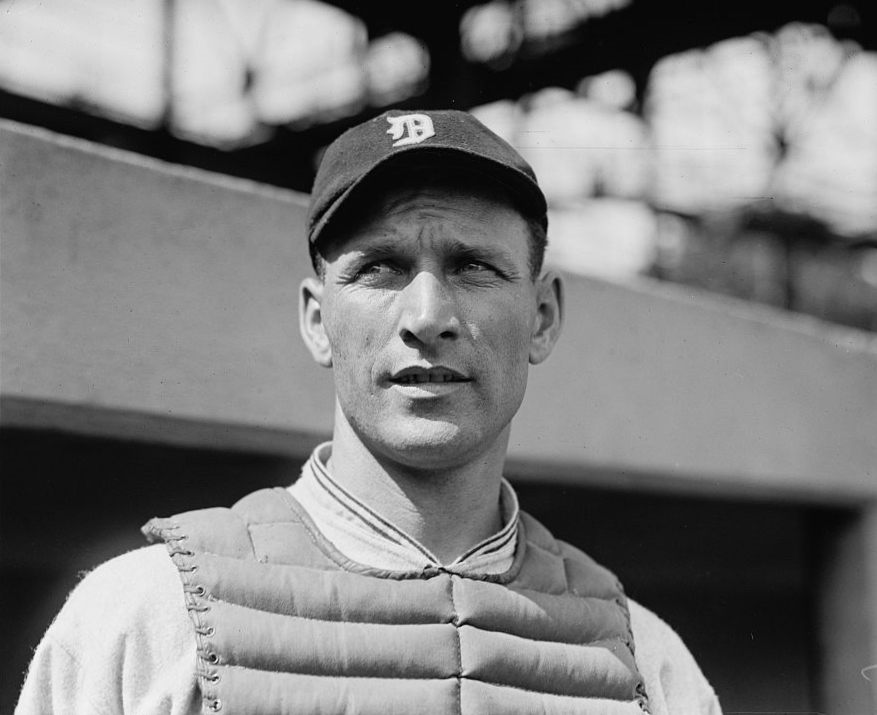
Manion with Detroit in 1924

Manion began his professional baseball career in 1918 with the Hutchinson Salt Packers/Oklahoma City Indians. He then advanced in 1919 to the Tulsa Oilers in the Western League and in 1920 to the Toledo Mud Hens in the American Association.

Manion made his major league debut on May 5, 1920, with the Detroit Tigers. He remained with the Tigers for seven years from 1920 to 1924 and 1926 to 1927. He appeared in 199 games with the Tigers, 134 as a catcher, and compiled a .227 batting average and .302 on-base percentage. He spent the 1925 season with the Toronto Maple Leafs of the American Association, compiling a .318 batting average in 138 games.

In May 1927, the Tigers released Manion to the Newark Bears of the International League. He compiled a .298 batting average in 79 games.

On October 4, 1927, the St. Louis Browns selected Manion in the 1927 draft. He played for the Browns from 1928 to 1930, appearing in 168 games and compiling a .227 batting average and .303 on-base percentage.

During the 1931 season, Manion played for the Milwaukee Brewers of the American Association. He compiled a .353 batting average in 138 games for the Brewers.

On September 30, 1931, Manion was drafted by the Cincinnati Reds. He played for the Reds from 1932 to 1934. He appeared in 110 games for the Reds, 79 as the Reds' starting catcher, and compiled a .190 batting average and .261 on-base percentage in those games.

In 13 years in the major leagues, Manion appeared in a total of 477 major league games (401 as a catcher) with a career batting average of .218 and a .293 on-base percentage. He had 250 hits, 112 RBIs, 96 runs scored, and 118 bases on balls.

== Family and later years ==
Manion's first wife, Vera, was killed in an automobile accident in June 1929 in Port Stanley, Ontario. After retiring from baseball, Manion became an agent of Equitable Life Insurance in Detroit. Manion died of a heart attack in September 1967 at age 70 at his Grosse Pointe Woods home. He was survived by his wife Marion (Dolly), two sons Clyde Jr, F. William (Bill) and a daughter Margaret.
