= Allen Conkwright =

American baseball player (1896–1991)

- Pitcher
- Born: December 4, 1896; Sedalia, Missouri, U.S.
- Died: July 30, 1991 (aged 94); La Mesa, California, U.S.
- Batted: Right Threw: Right

MLB debut
- September 16, 1920, for the Detroit Tigers

Last MLB appearance
- October 3, 1920, for the Detroit Tigers

MLB statistics
- Win–loss record: 2–1
- Earned run average: 6.98
- Strikeouts: 4
- Stats at Baseball Reference

Teams
- Detroit Tigers (1920)

Allen Howard "Red" Conkwright (December 4, 1896 – July 30, 1991) was an American Major League Baseball pitcher who played for the Detroit Tigers in 1920.
