= Roy Crumpler =

American baseball player (1896–1969)

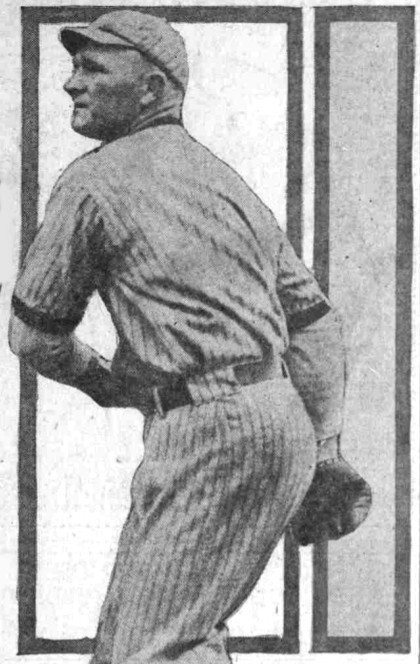
- Pitcher
- Born: July 8, 1896; Clinton, North Carolina, U.S.
- Died: October 6, 1969 (aged 73); Fayetteville, North Carolina, U.S.
- Batted: Left Threw: Left

MLB debut
- September 16, 1920, for the Detroit Tigers

Last MLB appearance
- September 27, 1925, for the Philadelphia Phillies

MLB statistics
- Win–loss record: 1–0
- Earned run average: 6.11
- Strikeouts: 3
- Stats at Baseball Reference

Teams
- Detroit Tigers (1920); Philadelphia Phillies (1925)

Roy Maxton Crumpler (July 8, 1896 – October 6, 1969) was an American professional baseball pitcher in Major League Baseball. He played for the Detroit Tigers and Philadelphia Phillies in the 1920 and 1925 seasons respectively.
