= John Glaiser =

American baseball player (1894–1959)

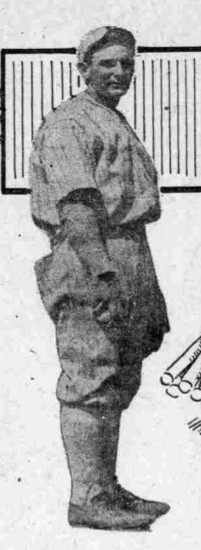
- Pitcher
- Born: July 28, 1894; Yoakum, Texas
- Died: March 7, 1959 (aged 64); Houston, Texas
- Batted: Left Threw: Right

MLB debut
- April 20, 1920, for the Detroit Tigers

Last MLB appearance
- May 31, 1920, for the Detroit Tigers

MLB statistics
- Win–loss record: 0–0
- Earned run average: 4.91
- Strikeouts: 2
- Stats at Baseball Reference

Teams
- Detroit Tigers (1920)

John Burke Glaiser (July 28, 1894 – March 7, 1959) was a Major League Baseball pitcher who played for the Detroit Tigers in 1920.
