= Lou Vedder =

American baseball and football player (1897–1990)

- Pitcher
- Born: April 20, 1897; Oakville, Michigan, U.S.
- Died: March 9, 1990 (aged 92); Lake Placid, Florida, U.S.
- Batted: Right Threw: Right

MLB debut
- September 18, 1920, for the Detroit Tigers

Last MLB appearance
- September 18, 1920, for the Detroit Tigers

MLB statistics
- Win–loss record: 0–0
- Earned run average: 0.00
- Strikeouts: 1
- Stats at Baseball Reference

Teams
- Detroit Tigers (1920)

Louis Edward Vedder (April 20, 1897 – March 9, 1990) was an American professional baseball player. He appeared in one game in Major League Baseball for the Detroit Tigers during the 1920 season as a relief pitcher. Listed at 5' 10", 175 lb., he batted and threw right-handed.

Born in Oakville, Michigan, Lou Vedder played just one game of professional baseball, but it was at the major league level. On September 18, 1920 Vedder pitched two perfect innings of relief for the Tigers in a 7–4 defeat to the visiting Boston Red Sox at Navin Field. He faced the minimum of six batters, striking out one of them, and never appeared in a major league game again.

Vedder was a longtime resident of Lake Placid, Florida, where he died at the age of 92.
