= Ernie Alten =

American baseball player (1894–1981)

- Pitcher
- Born: December 1, 1894; Avon, Ohio, U.S.
- Died: September 9, 1981 (aged 86); Napa, California, U.S.
- Batted: Right Threw: Left

MLB debut
- April 17, 1920, for the Detroit Tigers

Last MLB appearance
- June 30, 1920, for the Detroit Tigers

MLB statistics
- Win–loss record: 0–1
- Earned run average: 9.00
- Strikeouts: 4
- Stats at Baseball Reference

Teams
- Detroit Tigers (1920)

Ernest Matthias Alten (December 1, 1894 – September 9, 1981), nicknamed "Lefty", was an American Major League Baseball pitcher. Alten played for the Detroit Tigers in the 1920 season. In 14 career games, he had a 0–1 record with a 9.00 ERA. He batted right and threw left-handed.
