= Mutt Wilson =

American baseball player (1896–1962)

- Pitcher
- Born: July 20, 1896; Keyser, North Carolina
- Died: August 31, 1962 (aged 66); Wildwood, Florida
- Batted: Right Threw: Right

MLB debut
- September 11, 1920, for the Detroit Tigers

Last MLB appearance
- September 18, 1920, for the Detroit Tigers

MLB statistics
- Win–loss record: 1–1
- Strikeouts: 4
- Earned run average: 3.46
- Stats at Baseball Reference

Teams
- Detroit Tigers (1920)

William Clarence Wilson (July 20, 1896 – August 31, 1962), sometimes known by the nicknames "Mutt" and "Lank", was an American baseball player. He played professional baseball as a right-handed pitcher for 15 years from 1916 to 1930, including three games in Major League Baseball for the Detroit Tigers in September 1920.

== Early years ==
Wilson was born in Keyser, North Carolina, in 1896. He stood six feet, three inches tall and weighed 167 pounds. He was sometimes known by the nicknames "Mutt" and "Lank".

== Professional baseball ==
Wilson's professional baseball career began in 1916 with Eufala in the Dixie League. He advanced to Augusta in the South Atlantic League in 1917. He spent the 1918 season in the Texas League, playing for teams in Dallas and Shreveport.

Wilson spent the 1919 season with the Charleston Gulls in the South Atlantic League. He compiled a 19-11 record with a career-low 2.57 ERA. In March 1920, Wilson re-signed with Charleston. He compiled a 15-17 record and 2.78 ERA for Charleston during the 1920 season. He won 34 games in two games with Charleston.

In July 1920, Wilson was purchased by the Detroit Tigers from Charleston under an agreement that he would report in mid-September, at the end of Charleston's season. Wilson appeared in three games for the Tigers between September 11 and September 18. Two of his appearances were as a starter and the third was as a relief pitcher. He compiled a 1–1 win–loss record with an earned run average (ERA) of 3.46. He had one hit in four career at bats, for a .250 batting average.

Wilson continued playing in the minor leagues until 1930, including stints with Columbus (1921), Omaha (1922), Tampa (1923), and Wilson (1927). He spent the 1928 and 1929 seasons with the Greensboro Patriots of the Piedmont League. He compiled a 19–14 record for Greensboro in 1928. Prior to the 1929 season, he broke his right arm falling from a moving train. He finished his professional career with Henderson in the Piedmont League in 1930.

== Military service and later years ==
Wilson served in the U.S. Army during World War I and later worked for a railroad. He moved to Wildwood, Florida, in the late 1920s. He died at Wildwood in 1962 at age 66. He is buried at Lone Oak Cemetery in Leesburg.
