= Doc Ayers =

American baseball player (1891–1968)

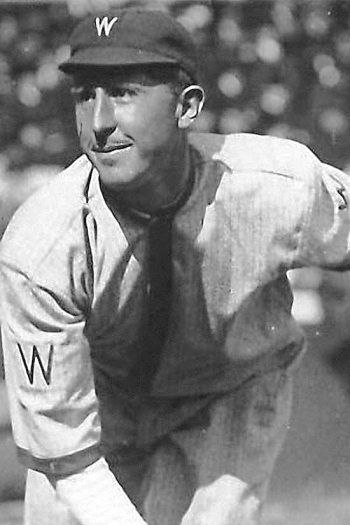
- Pitcher
- Born: May 21, 1891; Snake Creek, Virginia, US
- Died: May 26, 1968 (aged 77); Pulaski, Virginia, US
- Batted: Right Threw: Right

MLB debut
- September 9, 1913, for the Washington Senators

Last MLB appearance
- May 21, 1921, for the Detroit Tigers

MLB statistics
- Win–loss record: 64–78
- Earned run average: 2.84
- Strikeouts: 622
- Stats at Baseball Reference

Teams
- Washington Senators (1913–1919); Detroit Tigers (1919–1921)

Yancey Wyatt "Doc" Ayers (May 21, 1891 – May 26, 1968) was an American pitcher in Major League Baseball (MLB). He was known for throwing the spitball and was one of the 17 pitchers allowed to continue throwing the pitch after it was outlawed in 1920. Ayers played nine seasons in the American League with the Washington Senators (1913–19) and Detroit Tigers (1919–21). He batted and threw right-handed.

Doc Ayers was born in Carroll County, Virginia, on May 20, 1890. He attended Woodlawn High School in Woodlawn, Virginia, where he tried out for the school's baseball team. He gained the nickname "Doc" after he enrolled in the Medical College of Virginia, now the medical campus of Virginia Commonwealth University in Richmond. While at MCV, he bought a book on pitching. He was a catcher at WHS, but he reported as a pitcher when the call came for college baseball tryouts.

Ayers was the opposing pitcher for the Senators on June 23, 1917, against the Boston Red Sox. Ernie Shore relieved starting pitcher Babe Ruth after the first batter walked in, and Ruth was ejected for arguing with the umpire. The runner was caught stealing, and Shore retired the next 26 batters for a no-hitter. Manager Clark Griffith removed Ayers for a pinch-hitter in the ninth inning.

Ayers was a noted spitball pitcher who was allowed to throw the pitch after it had been banned in the major leagues after the 1919 season, having received special permission. In 1920, he struck out 103 batters and led the American League in strikeouts per nine innings (4.44). In 299 career games, Ayers posted a 65–79 win-loss record with a 2.84 earned run average and 109 games finished.

According to the January 11, 1953 issue of The Southwest Times, Doc held the record for the most strikeouts in organized baseball in 1913 while pitching for Richmond in the Virginia League. He struck out 390 batters in 342 innings and 47 games.

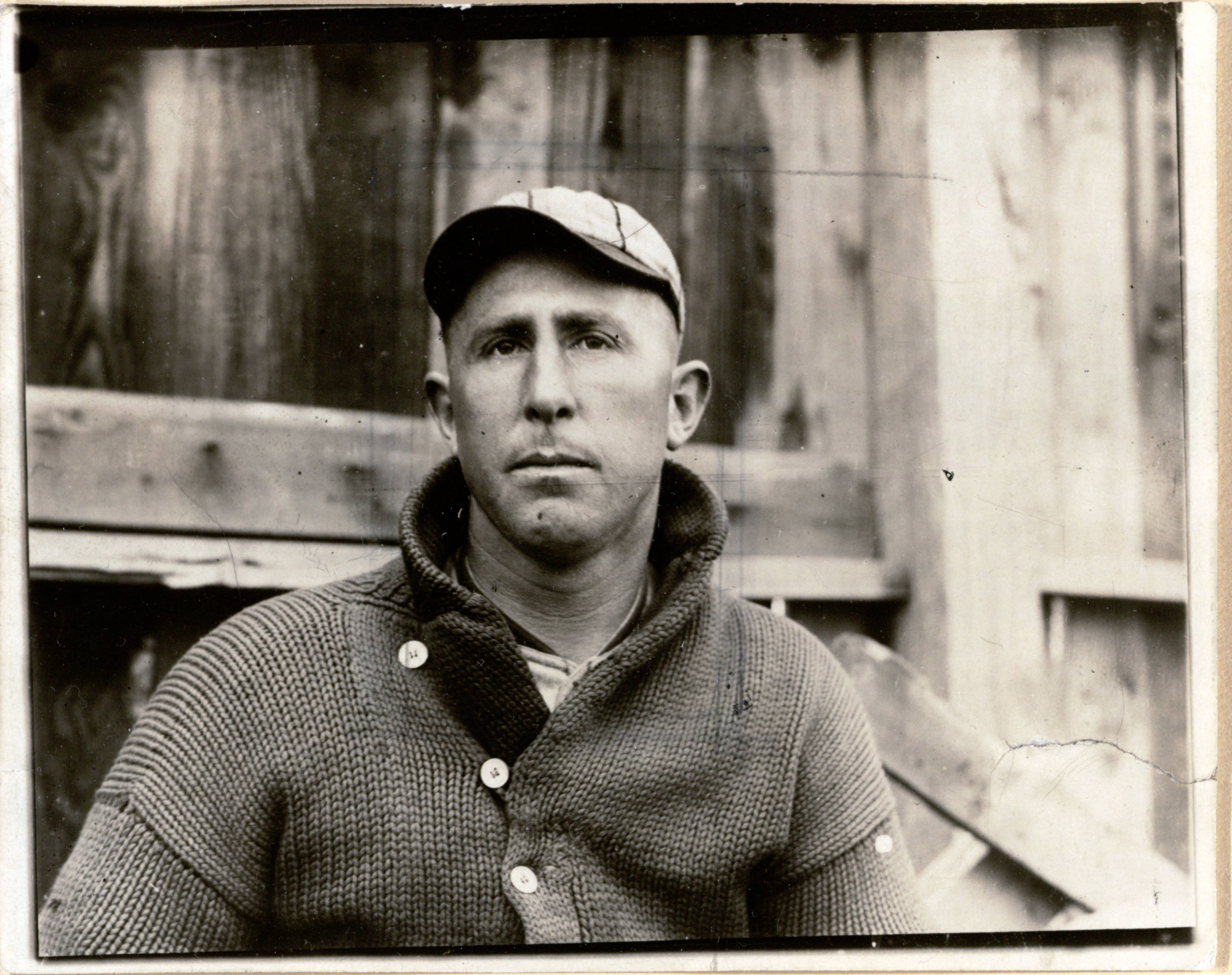
Doc Ayers, date unknown

After marrying Mary Elizabeth Dunlap in 1914, Ayers moved to a farm near Draper, Virginia. They had two children, Yancy Wyatt Ayers Jr, and Nancy Frances Ayers.

After he left baseball, Doc returned to his farm in the Draper community of Pulaski County and sold cars for the Wysor Motor Company to supplement his farming income. According to his WWII Draft Card, he was 6'1" tall, 272 pounds, with a ruddy complexion, gray eyes, and grey hair, and wore glasses. Doc died of a heart attack in the Pulaski Community Hospital and was buried in the Grantham Family Cemetery in Pulaski County. His wife died in Jefferson County, KY, only seven months after his death, and is buried next to him.
