= Steve Partenheimer =

American baseball player (1891–1971)

- Third baseman
- Born: August 30, 1891; Greenfield, Massachusetts, U.S.
- Died: June 16, 1971 (aged 79); Mansfield, Ohio, U.S.
- Batted: Right Threw: Right

MLB debut
- June 28, 1913, for the Detroit Tigers

Last MLB appearance
- June 28, 1913, for the Detroit Tigers

MLB statistics
- Batting average: .000
- Home runs: 0
- Runs batted in: 0
- Stats at Baseball Reference

Teams
- Detroit Tigers (1913)

Harold Philip "Steve" Partenheimer (August 30, 1891 – June 16, 1971) was an American baseball player and rubber industry executive and innovator.

Partenheimer played college baseball for Amherst College and then appeared in one game Major League Baseball with the Detroit Tigers on June 28, 1913.

He later spent more than 50 years working in the rubber industry and was credited with developing a "run flat" tire used on American military vehicles.

== Early years ==
Partenheimer was born in Greenfield, Massachusetts, in 1891. He attended Amherst College for four years from 1909 to 1913 and was captain of the varsity baseball team as a senior. He was named to Amherst's all century baseball team in 1959.

== Professional baseball ==
On June 20, 1913, Frank Navin, owner of the Detroit Tigers, announced that he had signed Amherst third baseman Partenheimer who would report shortly for a tryout. On June 28, in his one and only Major League game, Partenheimer played third base, collected three assists, and committed one error. At bat, he was hit by a pitch, but failed to register a hit, in three plate appearances.

Less than one week after his major league debut, the Tigers assigned Partenheimer to Utica in the New York State League. At the time, the Detroit Free Press wrote that he was not ready for "big time" baseball, "appears to be a good fielder, but shows poor form at bat." After his brief stint with the Tigers, Partenheimer played three years in New York State League.

== Family and later years ==
After retiring from baseball, Partenheimer obtained a doctoral degree from Columbia University and worked for more than 50 years in the tire business. He held positions with the Fisk Rubber Company, B. F. Goodrich Co., and starting in 1941 Mansfield Tire & Rubber Company. He became the director of research and development for Mansfield and was credited with developing a "run flat" tire that allowed military combat vehicles to run at high speed even after being punctured by bullets or shellfire.

Partenheimer also remained active in baseball, having affiliations with Mansfield Little League, the Gordon Drug Aces, the Akron Jays, Sohio Athletic Club and the Killian Celtics.

Partenheimer was married to Mary D. Stanwood, and they had two sons, Stanwood and Harold. Both sons played professional baseball, and Stanwood played in Major League Baseball as a pitcher in 1944 with the Boston Red Sox and in 1945 with the St. Louis Cardinals.

Partenheimer's wife died in 1958. He died in 1971 at age 79 at Mansfield Memorial Homes in Mansfield, Ohio. He was buried at Green River Cemetery in Greenfield, Massachusetts, and was posthumously inducted into the Greater Akron Baseball Hall of Fame in 1991.
