= 1913 Detroit Tigers season =

Major League Baseball season

1913 Detroit Tigers
- League: American League
- Ballpark: Navin Field
- City: Detroit
- Record: 66–87 (.431)
- League place: 6th
- Owners: William H. Yawkey and Frank Navin
- Managers: Hughie Jennings

The 1913 Detroit Tigers season was a season in American baseball. The team finished sixth in the American League with a record of 66–87, 30 games behind the Philadelphia Athletics.

== Regular season ==
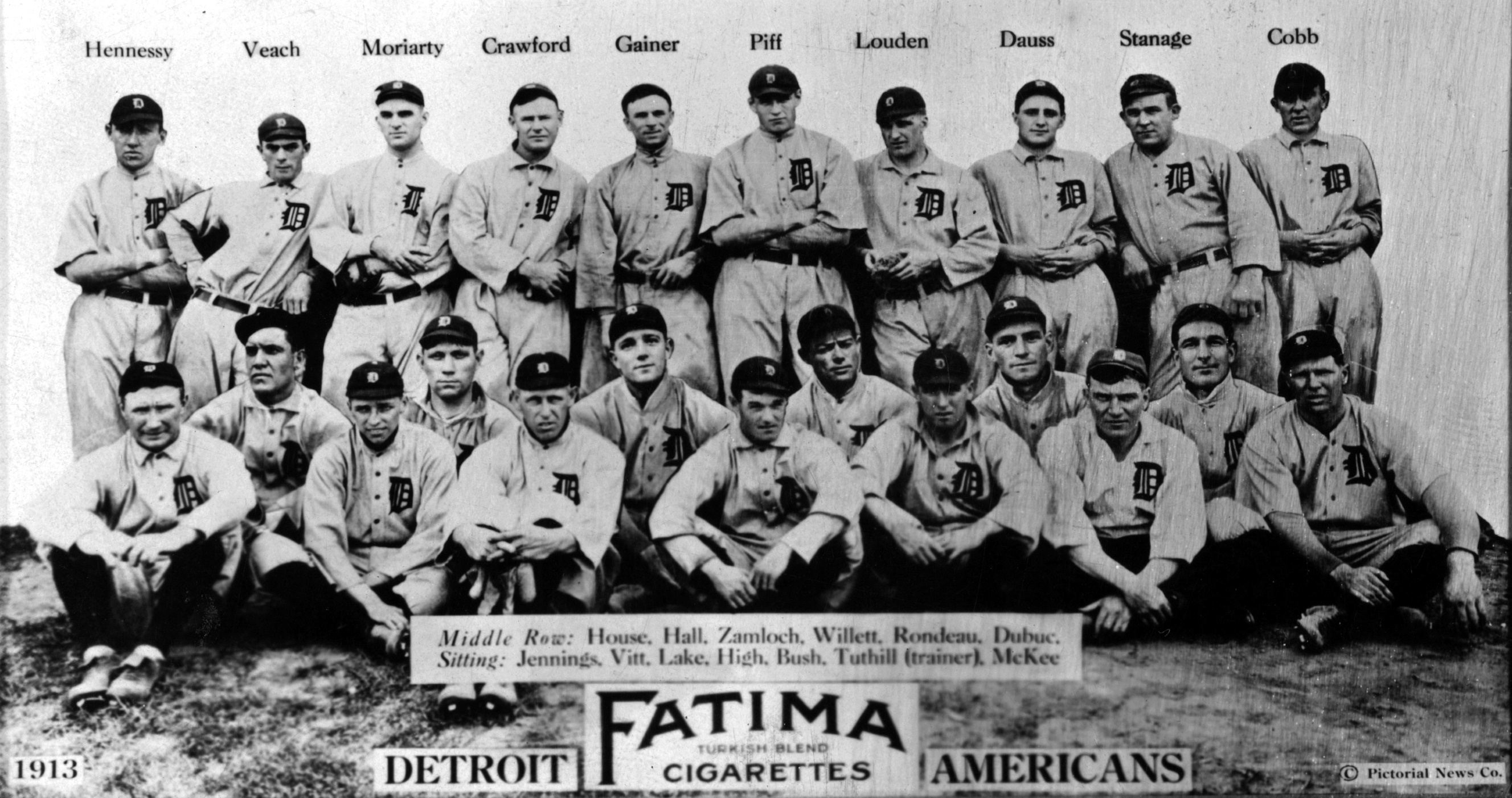

=== Season standings ===
American League
Team	W	L	Pct.	GB	Home	Road
Philadelphia Athletics	96	57	.627	—	50‍–‍26	46‍–‍31
Washington Senators	90	64	.584	6½	42‍–‍35	48‍–‍29
Cleveland Naps	86	66	.566	9½	45‍–‍32	41‍–‍34
Boston Red Sox	79	71	.527	15½	41‍–‍34	38‍–‍37
Chicago White Sox	78	74	.513	17½	40‍–‍37	38‍–‍37
Detroit Tigers	66	87	.431	30	34‍–‍42	32‍–‍45
New York Yankees	57	94	.377	38	27‍–‍47	30‍–‍47
St. Louis Browns	57	96	.373	39	31‍–‍46	26‍–‍50

=== Record vs. opponents ===
1913 American League record Sources:
Team	BOS	CWS	CLE	DET	NYY	PHA	SLB	WSH
Boston	—	10–11	8–13	13–9	14–6–1	11–11	17–5	6–16
Chicago	11–10	—	9–13–1	13–9	11–10	11–11	12–10	11–11
Cleveland	13–8	13–9–1	—	14–7	14–8–1	9–13	16–6–1	7–15
Detroit	9–13	9–13	7–14	—	11–11	7–15	11–11	12–10
New York	6–14–1	10–11	8–14–1	11–11	—	5–17	11–11	6–16
Philadelphia	11–11	11–11	13–9	15–7	17–5	—	15–6	14–8
St. Louis	5–17	10–12	6–16–1	11–11	11–11	6–15	—	8–14–1
Washington	16–6	11–11	15–7	10–12	16–6	8–14	14–8–1	—

=== Roster ===
1913 Detroit Tigers
Roster
Pitchers: George Boehler; Al Clauss; Ralph Comstock; Hooks Dauss; Jean Dubuc; Heinie Elder; Charlie Grover; Marc Hall; Charlie Harding; Fred House; Al Klawitter; Joe Lake; Lefty Lorenzen; George Mullin; Lou North; Erwin Renfer; Ed Willett; Lefty Williams; Carl Zamloch	Catchers: Frank Gibson; Red McKee; Henri Rondeau; Oscar Stanage; Infielders: Paddy Baumann; Donie Bush; Charlie Deal; Del Gainer; Les Hennessey; Baldy Louden; George Moriarty; Eddie Onslow; Steve Partenheimer; Pepper Peploski; Wally Pipp; Guy Tutwiler; Ossie Vitt	Outfielders: Joe Burns; Ty Cobb; Sam Crawford; Hugh High; Al Platte; Ray Powell; Bobby Veach	Manager: Hughie Jennings; Coaches: Deacon McGuire

== Player stats ==
=== Batting ===
==== Starters by position ====
Note: Pos = Position; G = Games played; AB = At bats; H = Hits; Avg. = Batting average; HR = Home runs; RBI = Runs batted in

Pos	Player	G	AB	H	Avg.	HR	RBI
C	Oscar Stanage	80	241	54	.224	0	21
1B	Del Gainer	105	363	97	.267	2	25
2B	Ossie Vitt	99	359	86	.240	2	33
SS	Donie Bush	152	597	150	.251	1	40
3B	George Moriarty	104	347	83	.239	0	30
OF	Sam Crawford	153	609	193	.317	9	83
OF	Ty Cobb	122	429	167	.389	4	67
OF	Bobby Veach	137	491	132	.269	0	64

==== Other batters ====
Note: G = Games played; AB = At bats; H = Hits; Avg. = Batting average; HR = Home runs; RBI = Runs batted in

Player	G	AB	H	Avg.	HR	RBI
Baldy Louden	76	191	46	.241	0	23
Paddy Baumann	50	191	57	.298	1	22
Red McKee	68	187	53	.283	1	20
Hugh High	87	183	42	.230	0	16
Henri Rondeau	36	70	13	.186	0	5
Frank Gibson	23	57	8	.140	0	2
Eddie Onslow	17	55	14	.255	0	8
Charlie Deal	16	50	11	.220	0	3
Guy Tutwiler	14	47	10	.213	0	7
Wally Pipp	12	31	5	.161	0	5
Les Hennessy	14	22	3	.136	0	0
Al Platte	9	18	2	.111	0	0
Joe Burns	4	13	5	.385	0	1
Pepper Peploski	2	4	2	.500	0	0
Steve Partenheimer	1	2	0	.000	0	0
Ray Powell	2	0	0	----	0	0

=== Pitching ===
==== Starting pitchers ====
Note: G = Games pitched; IP = Innings pitched; W = Wins; L = Losses; ERA = Earned run average; SO = Strikeouts

Player	G	IP	W	L	ERA	SO
Jean Dubuc	36	242.2	16	14	2.89	73
Ed Willett	34	242.0	13	14	3.09	59
Hooks Dauss	33	225.0	13	12	2.48	107
Marc Hall	30	165.0	9	12	3.27	69
Ralph Comstock	10	60.1	2	5	5.37	37
George Mullin	7	52.1	1	6	2.75	16
Lefty Williams	5	29.0	1	3	4.97	9
George Boehler	1	8.0	0	1	6.75	2
Lou North	1	6.0	0	1	15.00	3
Erwin Renfer	1	6.0	0	1	6.00	1

==== Other pitchers ====
Note: G = Games pitched; IP = Innings pitched; W = Wins; L = Losses; ERA = Earned run average; SO = Strikeouts

Player	G	IP	W	L	ERA	SO
Joe Lake	28	137.0	8	7	3.28	35
Carl Zamloch	17	69.2	1	6	2.45	28
Al Klawitter	8	32.0	1	2	5.91	10
Al Clauss	5	13.1	0	1	4.73	1
Charlie Grover	2	10.2	0	0	3.38	2

==== Relief pitchers ====
Note: G = Games pitched; W = Wins; L = Losses; SV = Saves; ERA = Earned run average; SO = Strikeouts

Player	G	W	L	SV	ERA	SO
Fred House	19	1	2	0	5.20	16
Heinie Elder	1	0	0	0	8.10	0
Lefty Lorenzen	1	0	0	0	18.00	0
Charlie Harding	1	0	0	0	4.50	0
