= 1950 in baseball =

The following are the baseball events of the year 1950 throughout the world.

== Champions ==
=== Major League Baseball ===
- World Series: New York Yankees over Philadelphia Phillies (4–0)
- All-Star Game, July 11 at Comiskey Park: National League, 4–3 (14 innings)

=== Other champions ===
- All-American Girls Professional Baseball League: Rockford Peaches
- Amateur World Series: Cuba
- College World Series: Texas
- First Japan Series: Mainichi Orions over Shochiku Robins (4–2)
- Little League World Series: North Austin Lions, Austin, Texas
- Negro League Baseball All-Star Game: West, 5–3

==== Winter leagues ====
- Cuban League: Alacranes del Almendares
- Mexican Pacific League: Tacuarineros de Culiacán
- Panamanian League: Carta Vieja Yankees
- Puerto Rican League: Criollos de Caguas
- Venezuelan League: Navegantes del Magallanes

==== Club tournaments ====
- Caribbean Series: Carta Vieja Yankees
- Interamerican Series: Cerveceria Caracas

== Awards and honors ==
- Most Valuable Player
  - American League: Phil Rizzuto (NYY)
  - National League: Jim Konstanty (PHI)
- Rookie of the Year
  - American League: Walt Dropo (BOS)
  - National League: Sam Jethroe (BSN)
- The Sporting News Player of the Year Award
  - Phil Rizzuto (NYY)
- The Sporting News Pitcher of the Year Award
  - American League: Bob Lemon (CLE)
  - National League: Jim Konstanty (PHI)
- The Sporting News Manager of the Year Award
  - Red Rolfe (DET)

== Statistical leaders ==
	American League		National League	
Stat	Player	Total	Player	Total
AVG	Billy Goodman (BOS)	.354	Stan Musial (STL)	.346
HR	Al Rosen (CLE)	37	Ralph Kiner (PIT)	47
RBI	Walt Dropo (BOS); Vern Stephens (BOS)	144	Del Ennis (PHI)	126
W	Bob Lemon (CLE)	23	Warren Spahn (BSN)	21
ERA	Early Wynn (CLE)	3.20	Sal Maglie (NYG)	2.71
K	Bob Lemon (CLE)	170	Warren Spahn (BSN)	191

== Major league baseball final standings ==
=== American League final standings ===
American League
Team	W	L	Pct.	GB	Home	Road
New York Yankees	98	56	.636	—	53‍–‍24	45‍–‍32
Detroit Tigers	95	59	.617	3	50‍–‍30	45‍–‍29
Boston Red Sox	94	60	.610	4	55‍–‍22	39‍–‍38
Cleveland Indians	92	62	.597	6	49‍–‍28	43‍–‍34
Washington Senators	67	87	.435	31	35‍–‍42	32‍–‍45
Chicago White Sox	60	94	.390	38	35‍–‍42	25‍–‍52
St. Louis Browns	58	96	.377	40	27‍–‍47	31‍–‍49
Philadelphia Athletics	52	102	.338	46	29‍–‍48	23‍–‍54

Locations of teams for the 1942–1953 American League seasons
American League

=== National League final standings ===
National League
Team	W	L	Pct.	GB	Home	Road
Philadelphia Phillies	91	63	.591	—	48‍–‍29	43‍–‍34
Brooklyn Dodgers	89	65	.578	2	48‍–‍30	41‍–‍35
New York Giants	86	68	.558	5	44‍–‍32	42‍–‍36
Boston Braves	83	71	.539	8	46‍–‍31	37‍–‍40
St. Louis Cardinals	78	75	.510	12½	48‍–‍28	30‍–‍47
Cincinnati Reds	66	87	.431	24½	38‍–‍38	28‍–‍49
Chicago Cubs	64	89	.418	26½	35‍–‍42	29‍–‍47
Pittsburgh Pirates	57	96	.373	33½	33‍–‍44	24‍–‍52

Locations of teams for the 1943–1952 National League seasons
National League

== All-American Girls Professional Baseball League final standings ==
Rank	Team	W	L	Pct.	GB
1	Rockford Peaches	67	44	.604	—
2	Fort Wayne Daisies	62	43	.590	2
3	Kenosha Comets	63	46	.578	3
4	Grand Rapids Chicks	59	53	.527	8½
5	South Bend Blue Sox	55	55	.500	11½
6	Racine Belles	50	59	.459	16
7	Peoria Redwings	44	63	.411	21
8	Kalamazoo Lassies	36	73	.330	30

== Nippon Professional Baseball final standings ==
=== Central League final standings ===
Central League	G	W	L	T	Pct.	GB
Shochiku Robins	137	98	35	4	.737	—
Chunichi Dragons	137	89	44	4	.669	9.0
Yomiuri Giants	140	82	54	4	.603	17.5
Osaka Tigers	140	70	67	3	.511	30.0
Taiyo Whales	140	69	68	3	.504	31.0
Nishi Nippon Pirates	136	50	83	3	.376	48.0
Kokutetsu Swallows	138	42	94	2	.309	57.5
Hiroshima Carp	138	41	96	1	.299	59.0

=== Pacific League final standings ===
Pacific League	G	W	L	T	Pct.	GB
Mainichi Orions	120	81	34	5	.704	—
Nankai Hawks	120	66	49	5	.574	15.0
Daiei Stars	120	62	54	4	.534	19.5
Hankyu Braves	120	54	64	2	.458	28.5
Nishitetsu Clippers	120	51	67	2	.432	31.5
Tokyu Flyers	120	51	69	0	.425	32.5
Kintetsu Pearls	120	44	72	4	.379	37.5

== Events ==
=== January ===
- January 10 – R. R. M. Carpenter Jr., the 34-year-old owner of the Philadelphia Phillies, announces that his team is abandoning its six-year-old attempt to rebrand itself as the Philadelphia Blue Jays. Returning whole-heartedly to their original moniker, in use since 1885, the 1950 Phillies will deck themselves out in red-pinstriped home uniforms with bright red caps, sweatshirts and socks, and Phillies in red script across their shirtfronts.
- January 18 – Coming off a sub-par 1949 season (15–14, 3.75, and only 108 strikeouts in 211 innings pitched), Bob Feller of the Cleveland Indians asks for, and receives, a significant pay cut. His 1950 deal is worth an estimated $45,000—a 31% reduction from his previous earnings of $65,000.
- January 23 – An Associated Press poll of sportswriters ranks the 1914 "Miracle" Boston Braves' comeback from last place on July 19 to the National League pennant and a four-game triumph in the 1914 World Series as the greatest upset in U.S. sports of the first-half of the 20th century.
- January 31 – In perhaps the most prominent and controversial amateur free agent signing of the era, the Pittsburgh Pirates sign southpaw pitching phenom Paul Pettit, 18, out of a suburban Los Angeles high school for a record-setting $100,000 bonus. Of that total, $85,000 buys out a Hollywood film producer who had acquired the rights to Pettit's life story. At the behest of "jilted" MLB clubs, the office of Commissioner of Baseball Happy Chandler conducts an investigation that clears the Pirates of any wrongdoing.

=== February ===
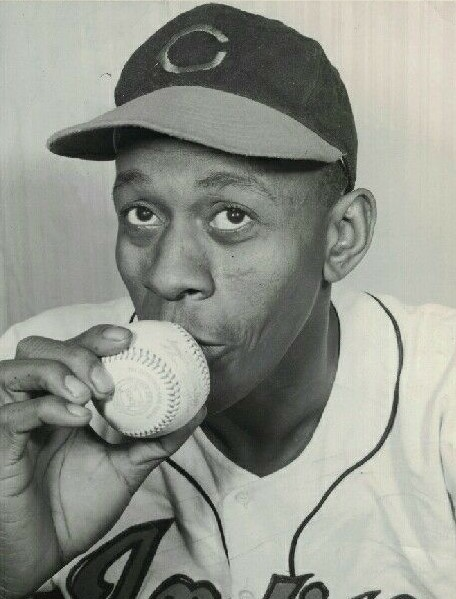
Satchel Paige in 1948

- February 9 – The Chicago White Sox acquire veteran catcher and native Chicagoan Phil Masi, 34, from the Pittsburgh Pirates in a cash transaction.
- February 10 – The Cincinnati Reds sell pitcher Johnny Vander Meer, 35, to the Chicago Cubs for an undisclosed amount of cash. In 1938‚ Vander Meer became the first pitcher in major league history to pitch two consecutive no-hitters, displaying his mastery over the Boston Bees (June 11) and the Brooklyn Dodgers (June 15), setting a record that still stands today.
- February 14 – The Chicago Cubs hire Wid Matthews as director of player personnel and de facto general manager. Matthews, 54, is a long-time associate of Branch Rickey's and most recently was the Midwest scouting supervisor of Rickey's Brooklyn Dodgers. He succeeds Charlie Grimm, who returns to uniform as manager of the Dallas Eagles of the Double-A Texas League.
- February 17 – The Cleveland Indians release Leroy "Satchel" Paige. The 43-year-old pitching great from the Negro leagues appeared in 52 games for Cleveland after joining the team in July 1948, fashioned a 10–8 record and 2.78 earned run average, with four complete games, two shutouts and six saves over 1½ seasons, and won a 1948 World Series ring.
- February 27 – In a tie-breaking game, Carta Vieja pitcher Chet Brewer defeats Puerto Rico's Caguas, 9–3, to give Panama the title in the 1950 Caribbean Series. Panama third baseman Joe Tuminelli, who hit two home runs and drove in six runs, is named Most Valuable Player.

=== March ===
- March 22 – Engineers from General Electric demonstrate an "electronic umpire" at the Brooklyn Dodgers' spring camp in Vero Beach, Florida. Along with calling balls and strikes, the device is designed to calculate the speed of pitchers' offerings.
- March 26 – The New York Giants purchase the contract of pitcher Jack Kramer from the Boston Red Sox. Kramer, 32, is in the twilight of a 12-year MLB career that saw him help pitch the 1944 St. Louis Browns to the American League pennant (17 wins, 2.49 ERA), post a stellar 1–0 (0.00 ERA) record in 11 innings in the 1944 World Series, and go 18–5 for the second-place 1948 Bosox.
- March 28 – Eddie Miller, a slick-fielding shortstop who made seven National League All-Star teams in the eight seasons between 1940 and 1947, is placed on waivers by the Philadelphia Phillies. Miller, 33, is a victim of the Phils' youth movement: in 1949, he was forced to move to second base when he was unseated by 22-year-old shortstop Granny Hamner, one of the "Whiz Kids" who will change the course of Philadelphia's baseball history in the season to come.

=== April ===
- April 11 – The Texas League Opening Day between the Dallas Eagles and Tulsa Oilers is staged at the Cotton Bowl. Hall of Fame members Frank Baker‚ Ty Cobb‚ Mickey Cochrane‚ Dizzy Dean‚ Charlie Gehringer, Travis Jackson and Tris Speaker are featured. The regular Dallas Eagles team takes to the field after Dean throws out the first pitch. 53‚578 fans‚ by then the largest paid crowd in minor-league history‚ enthusiastically enjoy the exhibition.
- April 18:
  - President Harry Truman throws out two balls at the traditional Presidential Opener at Griffith Stadium – one left-handed and the other right-handed. The game marks 87-year-old Connie Mack's Golden Anniversary season as manager of the visiting Philadelphia Athletics, who have made a major off-season trade looking to build upon their promising 1949 campaign and return to contention, and added gold trim to their uniforms in Mack's honor. However, the homestanding Washington Senators get the Athletics' season off on a sour note, scoring five first-inning runs and ultimately dealing Mack an 8–7 defeat.
  - The Boston Braves become the fifth of the 16 MLB teams to break the baseball color line with the debut of fleet centerfielder Sam Jethroe. At the Polo Grounds‚ Jethroe goes 2-for-4‚ including a home run, to lead the Braves to an 11–4 beating of the New York Giants behind winning pitcher Warren Spahn. Jethroe will be selected 1950's National League Rookie of the Year after leading the Senior Circuit with 35 stolen bases.
  - Billy Martin, later to become one of baseball's most controversial figures as a player and eventual manager, makes his major league debut at age 21, getting hits in both of his at bats, and scoring a run, and driving in three for the New York Yankees in a 15–10 win over the Boston Red Sox at Fenway Park's Opening Day. The Yanks overcome a 10–4 Boston lead with a nine-run eighth inning.
  - Vin Scully makes his debut as a broadcaster for the Brooklyn Dodgers, calling two innings of the team's 9–1 loss to the Philadelphia Phillies at Shibe Park. Scully will retire as the legendary Voice of the Dodgers in 2016 after a 67-year tenure, the longest (as of 2024) for any baseball broadcaster.
  - The first night Opening Day game in major league history is played at Sportsman's Park in St. Louis, with the Cardinals defeating the Pirates 4–2‚ behind the six-hit pitching of Gerry Staley. Stan Musial and Red Schoendienst contribute with a home run each for the winners.
  - Third baseman Ken Keltner, 33, is released by the Cleveland Indians. Best known for his stellar defensive plays that halted Joe DiMaggio's 56-game hitting streak on July 17, 1941, he further cemented himself in Cleveland lore by catching the final, game-clinching out of the 1948 World Series. The Boston Red Sox immediately sign Keltner as a free agent, then use him sparingly until releasing him for good on June 6.
- April 27 – The St. Louis Cardinals deal left-hander Ken "Hook" Johnson to the Philadelphia Phillies for outfielder Johnny Blatnik. Johnson, 27 and known for his curveball, threw a one-hitter for the Redbirds in his first MLB start on September 27, 1947, but his career has been marred by control problems.
- April 30 – In St. Louis, southpaws Harry Brecheen of the Cardinals and Johnny Schmitz of the visiting Chicago Cubs battle into the bottom of the 13th inning without allowing a run. Then, with one out, catcher Del Rice blasts a home run to give the Cardinals the 1–0 victory. Rice's game-winner is only the fourth hit of the day off Schmitz; meanwhile, Brecheen fans eight Cubbies.

=== May ===
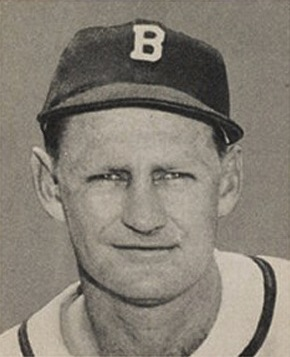
Bob Elliott

- May 2 – Just recalled from Triple-A to fill in for injured first baseman Billy Goodman, lanky rookie Walt Dropo is two-for-two in a 6–2 Boston Red Sox victory over the Cleveland Indians at Fenway Park. Dropo, 27, immediately becomes a Bosox regular; he goes on to co-lead the American League in runs batted in (144, tied with teammate Vern Stephens), slug 34 homers, bat .322, start for the AL in the All-Star Game, and win his circuit's Rookie of the Year Award. Goodman, meanwhile, returns to the Bosox lineup May 22 as a second baseman and later moves to the outfield—gaining enough plate appearances to win the AL batting title (.354).
- May 4 – The second-division Chicago White Sox enjoy a rare feast in the New York Yankees' home ballyard, collecting 23 hits and shutting out the Bombers, 15–0, in the Bronx. Bob Cain tosses a five-hitter, Jim Busby and Gus Zernial each lash four safeties, and Hank Majeski belts his third homer of 1950. Uncharacteristically, the Yankees are charged with four errors.
- May 6 – Five different Boston Braves—Bob Elliott, Sid Gordon, Willard Marshall, Luis Olmo and Earl Torgeson—hit home runs in a 15–11 trouncing of the Cincinnati Reds, and the Braves set a National League record of 13 home runs in three consecutive games‚ breaking the mark of 12 set by the New York Giants from July 1–3‚ 1947. Grady Hatton and Ron Northey hit consecutive homers for the Reds in a losing cause.
- May 8 – The Washington Senators deal outfielder Clyde Vollmer to the Boston Red Sox for shortstop Merl Combs and outfielder Tommy O'Brien.
- May 9 – Ralph Kiner of the Pittsburgh Pirates hits his second grand slam in three days—and the eighth of his career—then adds a three-run homer to drive in seven runs, as the Pirates beat the Brooklyn Dodgers, 10–5.
- May 10 – The last-place Cincinnati Reds (5–13) make three deals, trading catcher Walker Cooper to the Boston Braves for infielder Connie Ryan, purchasing the contract of pitcher Willie Ramsdell from the Brooklyn Dodgers, and selling infielder Jimmy Bloodworth to the Philadelphia Phillies.
- May 11 – After he misplays a ball in the Fenway Park outfield, Red Sox fans boo Ted Williams. He reacts by making an obscene gesture three times, once to the fans in right field, next to those in center, and finally to fans along the left-field line. The boos continue when Williams comes to bat, driving him to leave the batter's box and spit toward a group of booing fans near home plate. The Red Sox (now 14–9) drop a doubleheader to the Detroit Tigers (12–5) and fall out of first place; they trail Detroit by a full game in the American League standings. One day after his outburst, Williams will apologize to Red Sox fans.
- May 15:
  - The Red Sox unconditionally and unceremoniously release the only Black player in their organization, Piper Davis, from their Scranton affiliate after he plays only 15 games. Davis, 33, is leading the team—which is 2–13 and last in the Class A Eastern League—in doubles (four), home runs (three), and runs batted in (ten), with a batting average of .333. "What does a player have to do to make the grade?" a frustrated Davis asks a local sportswriter. Tom Yawkey's Red Sox will take nine more years before breaking the baseball color line.
  - The New York Yankees sell the contracts of two players—one to each St. Louis franchise: the Browns obtain right-handed pitcher Cuddles Marshall and the Cardinals get outfielder/sometime pitcher Johnny Lindell.
- May 17 – The arch-rival New York Giants and Brooklyn Dodgers make a rare deal with each other, with the Giants purchasing the contract of third baseman Spider Jorgensen. The Giants also sell 38-year-old veteran catcher Ray Mueller, famous as the "Iron Man" for his prodigious "most consecutive games caught" record set during the mid-1940s, to the Pittsburgh Pirates.
- May 26:
  - The Philadelphia Athletics, whose season began with the hope of pennant contention in Connie Mack's 50th year as manager, compound their on-field woes—they've dropped 21 of their first 32 American League games—with severe dissension among the Mack family itself. Mack's wife, his youngest son, Connie Jr., and Ben Macfarland (a member of the Shibe family) are arrayed in one ownership faction, while Mack's older sons by his first marriage, Roy and Earle, form the opposition. Today, the Mrs. Mack/Connie Jr./Macfarland team engineer the removal of Earle Mack as the club's assistant manager and heir apparent to Connie Sr., and name Baseball Hall of Fame former catcher Mickey Cochrane general manager and head of the front office, while Jimmy Dykes is elevated from coach to assistant manager. Roy and Earle Mack, who remain co-owners, begin planning to buy out their stepmother, half-brother, and Macfarland and regain control of the team. To do so, they will go into debt that will seriously hamper their efforts to keep the club solvent in coming years.
  - The 8–22 Chicago White Sox, lodged in last place in the American League, replace manager Jack Onslow with coach Red Corriden, who will handle the club for the remainder of 1950.
- May 31 – The White Sox and Washington Senators make a six-player trade, with Chicago sending pitcher Ray Scarborough, first baseman Eddie Robinson and second baseman Al Kozar to Washington for pitcher Bob Kuzava, second baseman Cass Michaels and outfielder Johnny Ostrowski.

=== June ===
- June 2 – The Detroit Tigers' future Hall-of-Fame third baseman George Kell hits for the cycle in a 16–2 crushing of the Philadelphia Athletics at Shibe Park. Kell's is the first of five "cycles" in the major leagues this season, most since 1940.
  - Others to hit for the cycle in 1950 are: the Pittsburgh Pirates' Ralph Kiner, another future Hall of Famer, June 25 against Brooklyn at Ebbets Field; Roy Smalley of the Chicago Cubs, June 28 against the Cardinals at Wrigley Field; Elmer Valo of the Athletics, August 2 against the White Sox at Comiskey Park; and Hoot Evers of the Tigers, September 7 against Cleveland at Briggs Stadium.
- June 7 – The Chicago Cubs deal veteran catcher Bob Scheffing to the Cincinnati Reds for outfielder Ron Northey.
- June 7–8 – Burying the American League's cellar-dwellers under an avalanche of runs, the third-place Boston Red Sox rout the St. Louis Browns 20–4 and 29–4 in successive days at Fenway Park. The Red Sox mash 51 hits over the two games, including 12 home runs. Baseball Hall of Fame second baseman Bobby Doerr slugs three homers and drives in eight in the June 8 contest. Boston sets an MLB record that day for extra-base hits in a nine-inning game (17). Their 29 runs scored remains in the record books until the Texas Rangers tally 30 against the Browns' successor franchise, the Baltimore Orioles, in 2007.
- June 14 – First baseman Mickey Vernon is traded by the Cleveland Indians to his original team, the Washington Senators, for pitcher Dick Weik.
- June 15:
  - The New York Yankees obtain pitchers Tom Ferrick and Joe Ostrowski and third baseman Leo Thomas from the St. Louis Browns for pitchers Don Johnson and Duane Pillette, second baseman Snuffy Stirnweiss, outfielder Jim Delsing, and $50,000. Reliever Ferrick will contribute eight wins and nine saves to the Yankees' pennant drive, then capture one of the Yanks' four victories in their sweep of the 1950 World Series.
  - Left-hander Billy Pierce one-hits the Yankees in a 5–0 Chicago White Sox victory at Comiskey Park. New York third baseman Billy Johnson spoils Pierce's no-hit bit with a fifth-inning single.

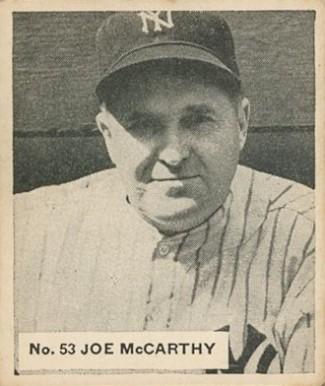
McCarthy's Yankees went 1,460–867 (.627) between 1931 and 1946 in regular season play, and 29–9 (.763) in winning seven of eight World Series

- June 18 – The Cleveland Indians score 14 runs in the bottom of the first inning and overwhelm the visiting Philadelphia Athletics, 21–2, to sweep a doubleheader against Connie Mack's hapless squad. Cleveland makes only six first-inning hits (although one of them is Ray Boone's three-run bomb) but takes advantage of seven walks issued by Lou Brissie and Carl Scheib.
- June 20 – Former Birmingham Black Barons centerfielder Willie Mays, 19, is signed by the New York Giants as an amateur free agent. He makes his minor league debut with the Class B Trenton Giants on June 24 at Municipal Stadium in Hagerstown, Maryland against the Hagerstown Braves. Mays will collect 179 hits in 455 at bats (.393), with 38 doubles, 11 triples, 18 home runs, and 88 runs scored in 116 total games in less than a calendar year in the minors before his National League debut on May 25, 1951.
- June 22:
  - An ailing Joe McCarthy, manager of the Boston Red Sox, arrives at his Western New York farm for a rest after being confined to his hotel room in Chicago since June 18 with an illness reported to be "influenza" and "pleurisy." Tomorrow, McCarthy will officially step down as the Bosox' manager and end his legendary career. "Marse Joe", 63, retires with a record of 2,125–1,333–29 for an all-time-best .615 winning percentage, including seven World Series championships and eight American League pennants during his tenure (1931 through May 23, 1946) with the New York Yankees. He previously had won a National League flag in 1929 with the Chicago Cubs. McCarthy, whose two full seasons with the Red Sox produced frustrating, second place finishes thanks to end-of-season losses, is replaced in Fenway Park's home dugout by coach Steve O'Neill, himself a veteran manager.
  - Insurance executive H. Gabriel Murphy becomes the second-largest shareholder in the Washington Senators when he acquires 40.4% of the team's stock from John Jachym. Murphy is an ally of chief stockholder (at 44%) and team president Clark Griffith, and his purchase ensures that Griffith will remain in control of the franchise he has operated since 1912. However, in 1960, Murphy will file suit in federal court against Clark Griffith's nephew and successor, Calvin, in a futile attempt to keep the Senators from moving to Minneapolis–Saint Paul.
- June 23 – Eleven home runs are struck in today's 10–9 victory for the Detroit Tigers over the New York Yankees at Briggs Stadium. Detroit, the winning side, slugs five of them, but are out-homered by the visiting Yanks. Hoot Evers and Hank Bauer trade two-homer days.
- June 24
  - The Philadelphia Phillies top the Chicago Cubs, 5–4, on a pair of two-run home runs by shortstop Granny Hamner and catcher Andy Seminick. The energetic Whiz Kids now trail the Brooklyn Dodgers by a game.
  - At Ebbets Field, a curfew suspends today's game between the Dodgers and Pittsburgh Pirates in the bottom of the eighth inning, with Brooklyn in the midst of a five-run uprising that gives them a 19–12 lead. The game will be completed August 1, with the Dodgers adding two more runs to ultimately defeat the Bucs, 21–12, on the strength of 25 hits.
- June 25 – The Korean War begins not even five years after the end of World War II; in baseball there is immediate concern over a potential large-scale conscription of players into the military, as in the previous decade. The Korean conflict's impact will be most keenly felt this season by the Phillies, who will lose the services of starting pitcher Curt Simmons for the last three weeks of September and the 1950 World Series when his National Guard unit is mobilized. Simmons, 21, departs for active duty with a record of 17–8 (3.40) with 11 complete games in 27 starts.

=== July ===
- July 1 – The first-place Philadelphia Phillies defeat the Brooklyn Dodgers, 6–4, behind unbeaten rookie right-hander Bob Miller, 24, who improves to 7–0 on the season. "Fireman" Jim Konstanty earns his ninth save.
- July 2 – Cleveland Indians great Bob Feller wins his 200th major league game, 5–3, over the Detroit Tigers.
- July 8 – At Forbes Field, pinch-hitter Jack Phillips hits a grand slam in the bottom of the ninth inning to give the Pittsburgh Pirates a come-from-behind, 7–6 victory over the St. Louis Cardinals. Phillips' shot comes off Harry Brecheen, and he becomes the first pinch-hitter to belt a walk-off grand slam in major league history. Ralph Kiner and Stan Rojek also homer for the Pirates, while Cliff Chambers is the winning pitcher. Red Schoendienst of the Cardinals is 5-for-5 in a lost cause.
- July 9 – The All–Star break sees the Philadelphia Phillies (44–29–2) a game in front of the St. Louis Cardinals (43–30), two ahead of the Boston Braves (42–31–2), and 4½ up on the Brooklyn Dodgers (38–32–1) in the National League; in the Junior Circuit, the Detroit Tigers (49–26–1) hold a three-game edge on the New York Yankees (47–30) and a 4½-game margin on the Cleveland Indians (46–32).
- July 10 – The New York Giants find a gem on the waiver wire, acquiring right-hander Jim Hearn from the St. Louis Cardinals. Hearn, 29, will immediately earn a place in the Giants' starting rotation, throw five shutouts in only three months (to lead all National League pitchers in 1950), then win 17 games in 1951 to help New York take the NL pennant.
- July 11 – Ted Williams fractures his left elbow in the All–Star Game when he crashes into Comiskey Park's left-field wall successfully chasing down Ralph Kiner's long fly. Williams does not return until September 7 and he will hit "only" .317, a career-low to this point, in 89 games during 1950. The NL All-Stars take the game, 4–3, on Red Schoendienst's 14th-inning homer off Ted Gray.
- July 18:
  - There's a mid-July logjam at the top of the National League standings: the Boston Braves, Philadelphia Phillies and St. Louis Cardinals are all 46–34 (.575) and the fourth-place Brooklyn Dodgers (43–34) are only 1½ games back.
  - The Pittsburgh Pirates' ownership reorganizes when John W. Galbreath becomes majority owner, succeeding Frank E. McKinney, who divests himself of his interest. Bing Crosby and Thomas P. Johnson remain minority partners. The original four-man group, led by McKinney, bought the franchise from the heirs of Barney Dreyfuss in August 1946. Galbreath and his family will direct the fortunes of the Bucs until 1985.
- July 19 – The New York Yankees purchase the contracts of pitcher Frank Barnes and catcher Elston Howard from the Kansas City Monarchs of the Negro American League.
- July 20 – The Philadelphia Athletics send high-priced 1949 acquisition Bob Dillinger to the Pittsburgh Pirates on waivers. Third baseman Dillinger is batting .309 with 110 hits in 84 games, but has angered Philadelphia manager Connie Mack with his indifferent play on defense.
- July 23 – Sheldon Jones of the New York Giants throws 72/3 innings of hitless ball against the Chicago Cubs at Wrigley Field before Rube Walker singles for the Cubs' only safety of the game. Jones gets the complete-game shutout, 3–0.
- July 25 – By sweeping a doubleheader at Shibe Park, 7–0 and 1–0, against the Cubs, the Philadelphia Phillies take over undisputed possession of first place in the National League race, a half-game in front of the St. Louis Cardinals. Bubba Church and Robin Roberts spin the pair of shutouts, allowing nine total hits.

=== August ===
- August 2 – The Cleveland Indians sever ties with Gene Bearden, releasing him on waivers to the Washington Senators. As a rookie in 1948, left-hander Bearden pitched the Tribe to an American League pennant and World Series championship. But, less than two years after his triumphant season, the "phenom" has become a journeyman: he'll see service with the Senators, St. Louis Browns, Detroit Tigers and Chicago White Sox before exiting the majors after the 1953 season.
- August 3 – The AL-leading Tigers add to their pitching staff by purchasing the contract of veteran right-hander Hank Borowy, 34, from the Pittsburgh Pirates. Detroit currently holds a two-game edge over the New York Yankees.
- August 6 – At Comiskey Park, Boston Red Sox pitcher Ellis Kinder hits a grand slam off Chicago White Sox ace Billy Pierce. Kinder collects six RBI, and his slam comes after an intentional walk to Birdie Tebbetts. Kinder also stops White Sox rookie Chico Carrasquel's hitting streak at 24 games. In the nightcap, pitcher Joe Dobson allows seven hits and the Red Sox win‚ 4–3‚ to sweep Chicago.
- August 11 – At Braves Field, Vern Bickford of the Boston Braves pitches a 7–0 no-hitter over the Brooklyn Dodgers. Bickford walks four, including two in the ninth, but is bailed out when Duke Snider bounces into a game-ending double play.
- August 15 – Ed "Whitey" Ford, a 21-year-old left-hander recalled from Triple-A Kansas City in late June, tosses a three-hitter for the first shutout and complete game of what will be a Hall-of-Fame career, and earns the New York Yankees a split of their doubleheader against the Washington Senators at Griffith Stadium. New York's 9–0 triumph kicks off a torrid, three-week stretch that sees the Bombers win 20 of 23 games, and gain first place in the American League on August 30.
- August 16 – New York Giants right-hander Sal Maglie, in his first season back in the National League after a four-year absence caused by his defection to the Mexican League and subsequent suspension, surrenders a mammoth, eighth-inning, three-run homer to Gil Hodges that lands on the roof of the Polo Grounds' left-field grandstand. Then Maglie shuts down Brooklyn for the rest of the way to secure a 16–7 victory.
  - Maglie's recovery from Hodges' blast sets off the majors' longest consecutive scoreless innings pitched streak of 1950. "Sal the Barber" does not allow a run for the next four weeks, hurling four complete-game shutouts and posting two frames of scoreless relief. Finally, on September 13, the Pittsburgh Pirates will tally a run (on Gus Bell's homer) in the seventh inning of Maglie's 3–1 four-hit victory to end his scoreless streak at 452/3 innings. Maglie, now 33, will go 18–4 and lead NL hurlers in earned run average and winning percentage in 1950.
  - In their second full season under Leo Durocher, the resurgent Giants will finish 86–68, in third place, five games in arrears of the Philadelphia Phillies.
- August 28 – Roy and Earle Mack, elder sons of Connie Mack, regain ownership control of the Philadelphia Athletics by acquiring stock held by their half-brother, Connie Jr., their stepmother, and Ben Macfarland. To do so, they secure a $1.75 million loan from the Connecticut General Life Insurance Company in exchange for a mortgage on Shibe Park and all concessions and rental income. They also announce that Connie Sr., 87, will continue as manager "indefinitely." However, servicing the loan will soon prove to be a fatal income drain that will doom the club's future in Philadelphia.
- August 31 – Gil Hodges of the Brooklyn Dodgers becomes the sixth Major Leaguer to belt four home runs in a single game. Hodges hits home runs off of four different Boston Braves pitchers and finishes the game with nine runs batted in. Brooklyn trounces Boston, 19–3.

=== September ===
- September 2 – At Braves Field, the Philadelphia Phillies' Curt Simmons out-duels Boston's Johnny Sain, 2–0, for his 17th triumph of 1950, and the Phillies' 35th win in their last 48 games. Now 80–47, they maintain a seven-game lead over second-place Brooklyn in the National League.
- September 5 – The New York Yankees purchase the contract of outfielder Johnny Hopp from the Pittsburgh Pirates.
- September 7:
  - With a tie of their own, the Detroit Tigers pull into a tie with the Yankees for the American League lead by battling the Cleveland Indians to a 13–13 deadlock over ten innings before the Briggs Stadium contest is called due to darkness. Hoot Evers collects five hits and hits for the cycle. The stalemate gives Detroit an 82–48–3 (.631) record and a two-percentage-point lead over New York (83–49–1, .629), who lost today. The statistics (including Evers' feat) will stand, but the game will be replayed in full during Detroit's end-of-season home series against Cleveland.
  - The St. Louis Cardinals purchase the contract of outfielder Peanuts Lowrey from the Cincinnati Reds.
- September 24 – Trailing the New York Yankees by 1½ games with only eight to play, the second-place Tigers drop a back-breaking ten-inning game to the home-standing Indians, 2–1. The game, played under smoke-filled skies caused by forest fires blazing across Lake Erie, is lost when Detroit catcher Aaron Robinson fails to see his first baseman record an out on Luke Easter's grounder with the bases loaded. Thinking that a force play is still in effect, when he gets the throw to execute a 3–2–3 double play, Robinson touches home to "force" the incoming Cleveland baserunner, Bob Lemon. However, because the out at first base demanded that Robinson tag the runner, not the plate, Lemon is able to score the Indians' winning tally. The Tigers ultimately finish three games in arrears of the Yankees when the season ends a week later.
- September 25 – Rookie Whitey Ford wins his ninth straight decision as a major-leaguer, hurling a complete game, 7–4 triumph for the Yankees against the Washington Senators. Two days later, in relief against the Philadelphia Athletics at Shibe Park, Ford gives up a game-winning, two-run, ninth-inning homer to Sam Chapman and suffers the first loss of his career.
- September 27 – Seventeen-year-old Harry Chiti makes his MLB debut for the Chicago Cubs. Chiti's best remember for something that happened later in his career. He would become the first player in major league history traded for himself.
- September 30:
  - The Brooklyn Dodgers pull within one game of the National League lead, winning 7–3 over the Philadelphia Phillies in the first of a two-games series at Ebbets Field. Duke Snider and Roy Campanella hit home runs for the Dodgers, as Erv Palica (13–8) is the winning pitcher. Bob Miller (11–6) is the loser.
  - At Fenway Park, sixth-inning RBI hits by Gene Woodling, Billy Martin and Yogi Berra (a two-run homer) key an eventual 6–5 victory over the Boston Red Sox, and enable the New York Yankees to claim their 17th AL pennant since 1921.

=== October ===
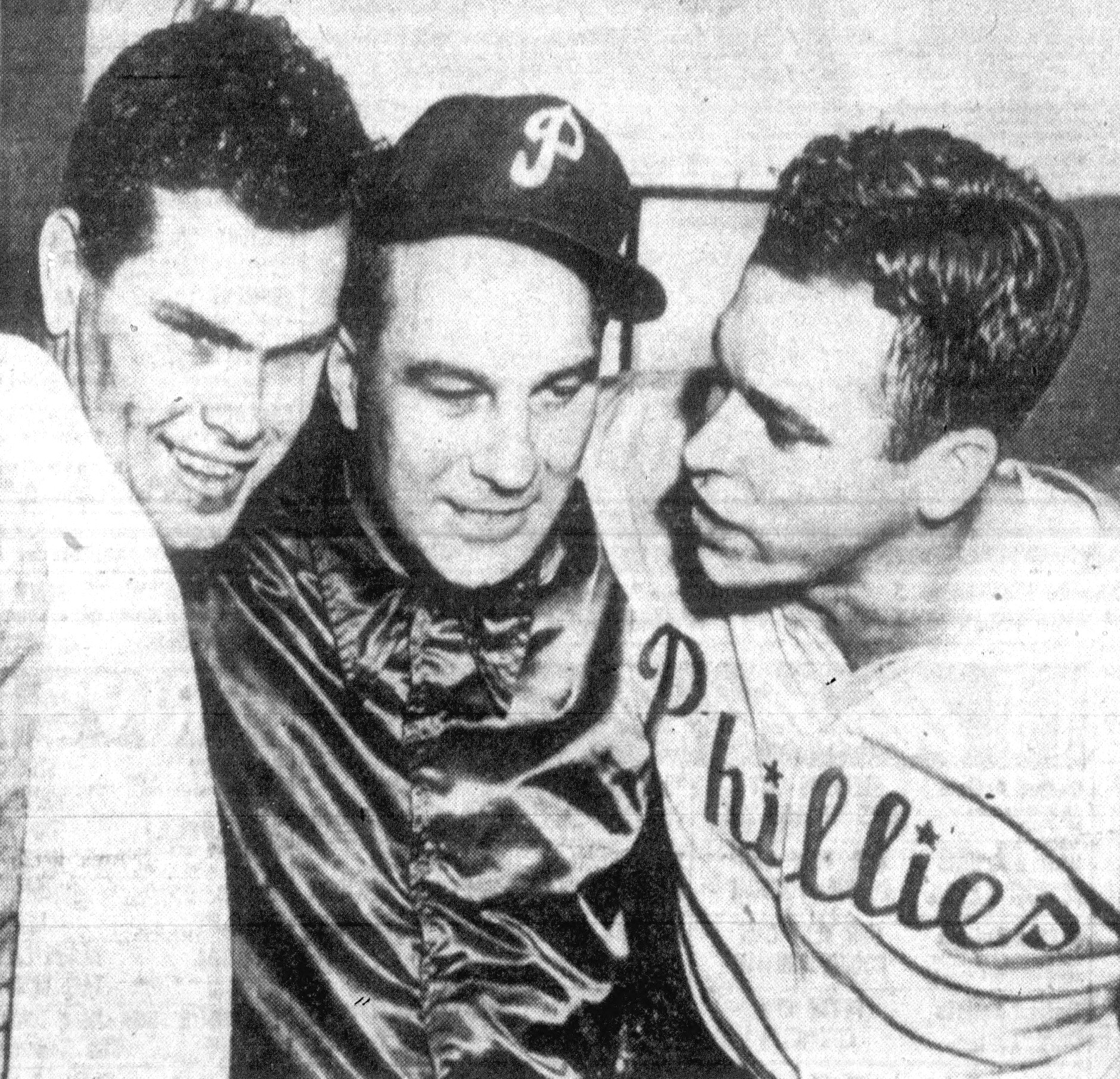
October 1, 1950: Robin Roberts, manager Eddie Sawyer and Dick Sisler celebrate

- October 1:
  - At Ebbets Field, the Philadelphia Phillies clinch the National League pennant on a tenth-inning, three-run home run by left fielder Dick Sisler against Don Newcombe, in a dramatic 4–1 victory over the Brooklyn Dodgers on the season's last day. An inside-the-park home run by Pee Wee Reese accounts for the only Dodgers' run; a potential ninth-inning winning rally is quelled when Richie Ashburn easily throws out Brooklyn baserunner Cal Abrams at home plate. Robin Roberts, making his third start in five days, earns his 20th victory of the season. It's only the second NL title in the Phils' 68-year-long history, and their first since 1915.
  - At Comiskey Park, Gus Zernial of the Chicago White Sox becomes the first player to hit three home runs in his team's final game of a regular season, doing so in the White Sox' 10–6 loss in the second game of a doubleheader against the St. Louis Browns. Zernial will be joined by Dick Allen in 1968 and Evan Longoria in 2012 as players to hit three home runs in their team's regular-season finale.
- October 7 – The New York Yankees defeat the Philadelphia Phillies, 5–2, in Game 4 of the World Series to win undefeated their thirteenth world championship. The Phillies will not appear again in the postseason until 1976, and they will not appear again in the World Series until they win it for the very first time in 1980.
- October 8 – Former MLB catcher Paul Richards, 42, is named manager of the Chicago White Sox. In 1950, Richards had led the Triple-A Seattle Rainiers to only a 96–104 record over the lengthy Pacific Coast League season, but in Chicago he will turn around the on-field fortunes of the long-bedraggled franchise, posting a 342–265–6 (.563) mark and four first-division finishes.
- October 10 – The Chicago Cubs acquire two first basemen from the Brooklyn Dodgers in exchange for outfielder Hank Edwards and cash. One of them is Dee Fondy, who will become the Cubs' regular first sacker. The other is Chuck Connors, a Brooklyn native who will eventually become an actor and gain fame as the star of TV's The Rifleman.
- October 16 – Eddie Dyer, manager of the St. Louis Cardinals since Opening Day 1946, resigns his post after a disappointing, fifth-place finish. He leaves with a 446–325–6 (.578) record over five seasons, with one World Series championship. Dyer, 51, steps away from baseball and returns full-time to his successful business career in Houston.
- October 18 – Hall-of-Famer Connie Mack, 87, retires as manager of the Philadelphia Athletics after 50 years at the helm—the only pilot the team has known since its founding in 1901. Assistant manager Jimmy Dykes, 53, who played for "The Tall Tactician" between 1918 and 1932, then spent all or part of 13 seasons between 1934 and 1946 as manager of the Chicago White Sox, is named Mack's successor. Mack, who retains the title of team president and his ownership stake, retires after having won nine American League pennants and five World Series championships over his half century with the Athletics; however, he compiled a losing winning percentage (.484) over that time, and his Philadelphia teams finished last 17 times and were frequently in financial distress.
- October 26:
  - A seismic change occurs in the Brooklyn Dodgers' front office. One-quarter owner Walter O'Malley announces that Branch Rickey's contract as president and general manager will not be renewed, and that he has acquired Rickey's 25% interest to become principal owner, controlling 50% of the team's stock. O'Malley, 47, assumes the club presidency and promotes two Dodger executives to vice president: Montreal Royals' general manager Buzzie Bavasi, who will supervise the MLB Dodgers' baseball operations, and assistant minor league director Fresco Thompson, who will run the far-flung Brooklyn farm system. O'Malley thus triumphs in a long-running power struggle with Rickey over the Dodger organization.
  - Phil Rizzuto, New York Yankees' shortstop, wins the American League MVP Award for 1950, capturing 16 of 23 first-place votes. Versatile Billy Goodman of the Boston Red Sox, the AL batting champ, is a distant second.
- October 27 – Joe Gordon's 11-year big league playing career ends when he's released by the Cleveland Indians. The future Hall of Fame second baseman, 35, who won five World Series rings over that span, becomes the player-manager of the Sacramento Solons of the Pacific Coast League.

=== November ===
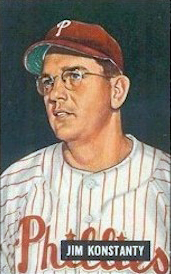
Jim Konstanty

- November 2 – Philadelphia Phillies relief ace Jim Konstanty is selected the National League MVP for 1950. Appearing in a record 74 games, he won 16 games, saved 22 others, and started his team's first World Series game in 45 years. The veteran 33-year-old moundsman amasses 18 of 24 first-place votes, and outpaces 3x former MVP Stan Musial.
- November 3 – Future Baseball Hall of Fame executive Branch Rickey, forced out of the Brooklyn Dodgers' ownership suite and front office just a week earlier, becomes executive vice president and general manager of the last-place Pittsburgh Pirates, succeeding Roy Hamey. Rickey, 68, is renowned for inventing the farm system of player development and building the St. Louis Cardinals into a perennial contender when he ran their front office from 1925 to 1942. Then, from 1943 to 1950, he worked to break the baseball color line and built another leading-edge farm system with the Dodgers, who are poised to become a National League dynasty.
- November 9 – After 2,422 games played (and 2,749 career hits) over his 21-season career, the Chicago White Sox release veteran Luke Appling, 43, their long-time shortstop and two-time American League batting champion. "Ol' Aches and Pains" will be elected to the Baseball Hall of Fame in 1964, and the White Sox will eventually retire Appling's #4 uniform.
- November 10 – The Cleveland Indians change managers, replacing playing skipper Lou Boudreau with former catcher Al López, 42, who had been managing Triple-A Indianapolis. Boudreau, 33, had led Cleveland to a 728–649–12 (.529) record over nine full seasons, including the 1948 AL pennant and World Series championship. Eleven days later, the future Hall-of-Fame shortstop is unconditionally released at his own request. Then, on November 27, Boudreau signs a two-year playing contract with the Boston Red Sox worth an estimated $150,000.
- November 26 – The Gillette Safety Razor Co. signs a six-year deal, worth an estimated $6 million, with Major League Baseball for the television and radio rights for the World Series.
- November 28 – Brooklyn Dodgers majority owner Walter O'Malley continues his house-cleaning as he names PCL Oakland manager and former Brooklyn third-base coach Chuck Dressen, 56, to replace Burt Shotton as the Dodgers' skipper. Shotton, 66, a longtime associate of ousted Dodger president Branch Rickey, compiled a 326–215 record, with two NL pennants, between 1947 and 1950.
- November 29 – The St. Louis Cardinals fill their managerial opening when their stellar shortstop, seven-time NL All-Star Marty Marion, hangs up his glove at age 33 and signs a one-year contract.

=== December ===
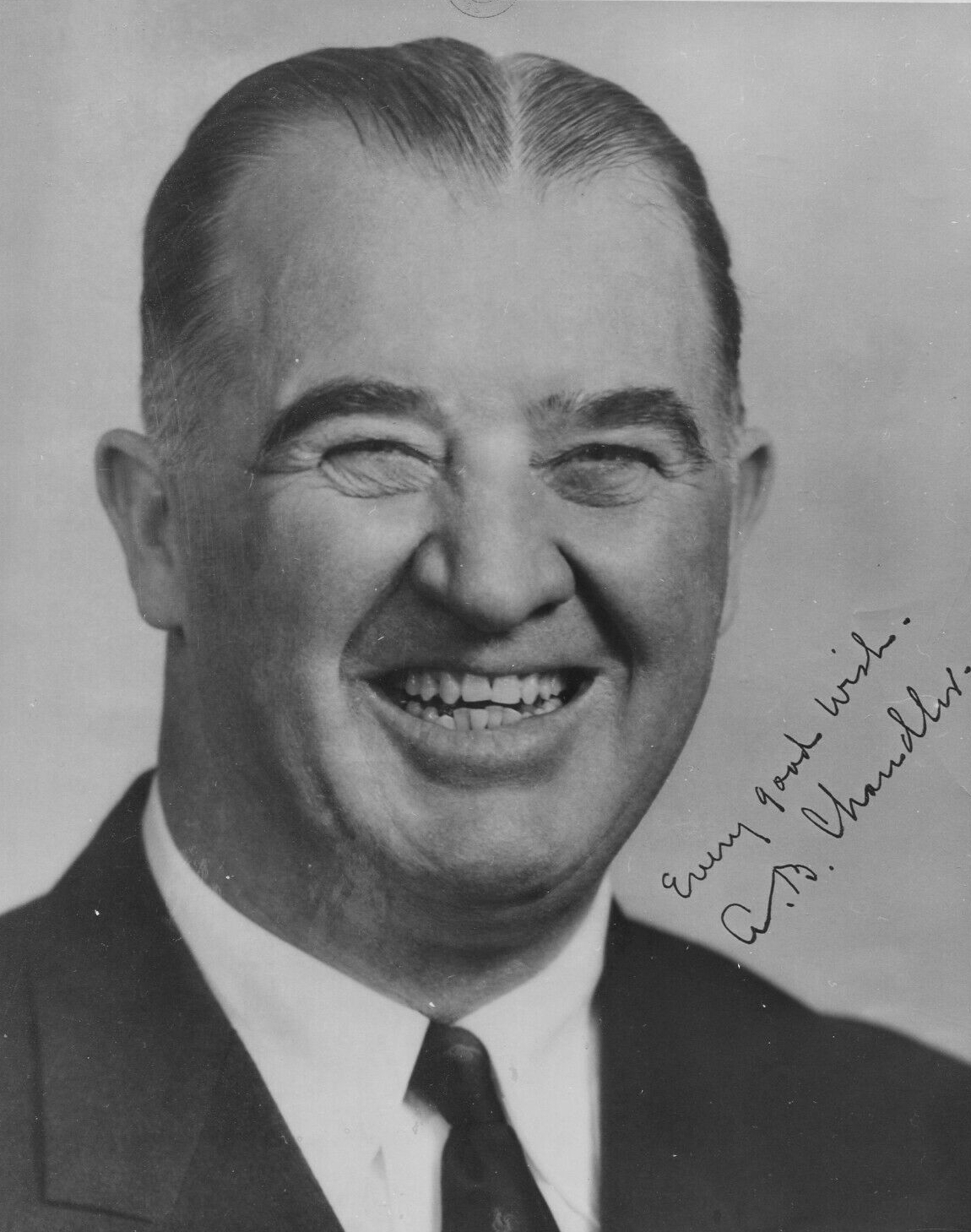
A. B. "Happy" Chandler

- December 5 – Mel Ott hires on for two years to fill the Oakland Oaks managerial spot vacated by Chuck Dressen. Ott last managed on July 15, 1948, his final game as skipper of the New York Giants. He comes to the Pacific Coast League having never played (or managed) a game in minor league baseball.
- December 10 – A quiet off-season trade market briefly stirs to life when the Boston Red Sox send pitchers Joe Dobson and Dick Littlefield and outfielder Al Zarilla to the Chicago White Sox for pitchers Ray Scarborough and Bill Wight.
- December 11 – Serious dissatisfaction with Commissioner of Baseball Happy Chandler's job performance unexpectedly surfaces at the MLB owners' meeting in Saint Petersburg, Florida. An early discussion of extending Chandler's contract (which expires April 30, 1952) reveals that only nine of the 16 clubs are in favor of retaining the former U.S. Senator from Kentucky. Three votes are then taken, with Chandler failing to gain more than nine "ayes". Chandler offers to quit immediately, then vows he will remain "to the last second of office". The owners then vote unanimously to begin searching for a new Commissioner while Chandler campaigns to keep his post.
- December 13 – The Boston Red Sox sell the contract of veteran catcher Birdie Tebbetts to the Cleveland Indians, and purchase backstop Mike Guerra from the Philadelphia Athletics. Tebbetts, 38, is coming off one of his best offensive seasons (.310 in 79 games), but he angered Boston management by publicly criticizing members of the Bosox pitching staff as "juvenile delinquents" and "moronic malcontents" after the season.
- December 28 – The New York Yankees release "Old Reliable," veteran outfielder Tommy Henrich, 37, who won six World Series rings and was selected to five AL All-Star teams during his 11 seasons with the Bombers.

== Movies ==
- Kill the Umpire
- The Jackie Robinson Story

== Births ==
=== January ===
- January 3 – Bart Johnson
- January 6 – Roy Staiger
- January 7 – Ross Grimsley
- January 12 – Randy Jones
- January 13:
  - Bob Forsch
  - Mike Tyson
- January 18:
  - Marvin Lane
  - Bill Sharp
- January 19 – Jon Matlack
- January 24 – Ron Dunn
- January 26 – Mike Pazik
- January 28 – Larvell Blanks
- January 29 – John Fuller
- January 31 – Bob Apodaca

=== February ===
- February 1 – Don Castle
- February 2 – Dale Murray
- February 4 – Max León
- February 7 – Burt Hooton
- February 15:
  - Rick Auerbach
  - Larry Yount
- February 18 – Bruce Kison
- February 26 – Jack Brohamer

=== March ===
- March 2 – Pete Broberg
- March 5 – Doug Bird
- March 7 – J. R. Richard
- March 9:
  - Doug Ault
  - Wendell Kim
- March 14 – Dave McKay
- March 27:
  - Vic Harris
  - Lynn McGlothen
- March 30 – Grady Little

=== April ===
- April 2 – Milt Ramírez
- April 10 – Ken Griffey
- April 15 – Dick Sharon
- April 17 – Pedro García
- April 20:
  - Willie Prall
  - Milt Wilcox
- April 21 – Greg Harts
- April 25 – Bill Greif
- April 26 – Tom Norton
- April 28 – Jorge Roque
- April 29 – Bob Kaiser

=== May ===
- May 1 – Rich Troedson
- May 4:
  - Butch Alberts
  - Jack Baker
- May 8 – Lloyd Allen
- May 11 – Dane Iorg
- May 12 – Pat Darcy
- May 13:
  - Juan Beníquez
  - Bobby Valentine
- May 18 – Osamu Higashio
- May 21:
  - Bob Molinaro
  - Hank Webb
- May 25:
  - Glenn Borgmann
  - John Montefusco
- May 28 – Jim Cox
- May 31 – Tippy Martinez

=== June ===
- June 3 – Jim Dwyer
- June 7 – Richie Moloney
- June 10 – Elías Sosa
- June 13 – Bob Strampe
- June 14 – Bill Fahey
- June 19:
  - Rudy Arroyo
  - Fernando González
  - Duane Kuiper
  - Jim Slaton
- June 21 – Mike Beard
- June 26 – Dave Rosello
- June 28 – Chris Speier

=== July ===
- July 3 – Rob Ellis
- July 5 – Gary Matthews
- July 21 – Mike Cubbage
- July 23 – Joe Goddard

=== August ===
- August 1:
  - Milt May
  - Wayne Tyrone
- August 7 – Mike Poepping
- August 9 – Junior Kennedy
- August 13 – Rusty Gerhardt
- August 14 – Jim Mason
- August 15 – Tom Kelly
- August 17:
  - Larry Johnson
  - Dave Lemanczyk
- August 19 – Mike Phillips
- August 22 – Ray Burris
- August 25:
  - Dave Heaverlo
  - Stan Perzanowski
- August 28 – Ron Guidry
- August 29:
  - Doug DeCinces
  - George Zeber
- August 30:
  - Dave Chalk
  - Mike McQueen
  - Andy Merchant

=== September ===
- September 2 – Lamar Johnson
- September 4:
  - Doyle Alexander
  - Frank White
- September 15 – Dave Hilton
- September 19 – Buddy Schultz
- September 26 – Bill Moran
- September 29:
  - Jim Crawford
  - Ken Macha

=== October ===
- October 4 – Ed Halicki
- October 9 – Brian Downing
- October 10 – Terry Enyart
- October 13 – Dick Pole
- October 16:
  - Jeff Terpko
  - Hugh Yancy
- October 24 – Rawly Eastwick
- October 26:
  - Dave Coleman
  - Wayne Garland

=== November ===
- November 1 – Clint Compton
- November 7 – Willie Norwood
- November 12 – Bruce Bochte
- November 22:
  - Lyman Bostock
  - Greg Luzinski
- November 24:
  - John Balaz
  - George Throop
- November 26 – Jorge Orta
- November 27 – Bob Sheldon
- November 28 – Jim Fuller
- November 29:
  - Mike Easler
  - Otto Vélez
- November 30 – Craig Swan

=== December ===
- December 2 – Bob Kammeyer
- December 6 – Tim Foli
- December 7 – Rich Coggins
- December 12 – Gorman Thomas
- December 15:
  - Chuck Hockenbery
  - Mike Proly
- December 21 – Jim Wright
- December 22:
  - Tom Makowski
  - Tommy Sandt
- December 25 – Manny Trillo
- December 26:
  - Mario Mendoza
  - Mike Willis
- December 28 – Steve Lawson

== Deaths ==
=== January ===
- January 8 – Helene Robison Britton, 70, first woman to own a major league team when she inherited the St. Louis Cardinals from her uncle in 1911; sold Redbirds in 1917 to a local consortium that included Sam Breadon and Branch Rickey.
- January 14 – Bill Thomas, 72, outfielder for the 1902 Philadelphia Phillies.
- January 16 – Rudy Hulswitt, 72, shortstop who played for the Louisville Colonels, Philadelphia Phillies, Cincinnati Reds and St. Louis Cardinals in parts of seven seasons spanning 1899–1910.
- January 17:
  - Jewel Ens, 60, backup infielder for the Pittsburgh Pirates from 1922 to 1925, who later managed (1929–1931) and served as a coach (1926–1929 and 1935–1939) for them; member of the 1925 World Series champions and 1927 National League champs; also coached for Detroit Tigers, Cincinnati Reds and Boston Braves; manager of Syracuse Chiefs of the International League from 1942 until his death.
  - Roy Sanders, 57, pitcher who played from 1917 to 1918 for the Cincinnati Reds and Pittsburgh Pirates.
- January 26:
  - Chick Autry, 46, backup catcher who played for the New York Yankees, Cleveland Indians and Chicago White Sox in part of six seasons spanning 1924–1930.
  - Tom Bannon, 80, backup first baseman and outfielder for the New York Giants in their 1895 and 1896 seasons.
- January 29 – Monroe Sweeney, 57, umpire who officiated in the National League between the 1924 and 1926 seasons.

=== February ===
- February 2 – John Butler, 70, backup catcher who played with the Milwaukee Brewers, St. Louis Cardinals and Brooklyn Superbas in four seasons from 1901 to 1907, and later coached for the Chicago White Sox.
- February 3 – Dick Spalding, 56, outfielder for the Philadelphia Phillies in the 1927 season and the Washington Senators in 1928, who previously played the first two games in the history of the U.S. national soccer team and also competed in professional soccer for nearly fifteen years.
- February 5 – Ralph Shafer, 55, who appeared as a pinch-runner in one game for the Pittsburgh Pirates in the 1914 season.
- February 6 – Art Fletcher, 65, a player, coach and manager who participated in fourteen World Series––four as a smooth fielding shortstop for the New York Giants and ten as a base coach with the New York Yankees––earning nine series rings with the Yankees; led the National League for the most assists in 1915 and from 1917 to 1919; manager of the Philadelphia Phillies from 1923 to 1926 and acting skipper of the Yankees in September 1929.
- February 10 – Charlie Roy, 65, pitcher for the 1906 Philadelphia Phillies.
- February 11:
  - Kiki Cuyler, 51, Hall of Fame outfielder with a strong throwing arm as well as a solid line-drive hitter in an 18-year career from 1921 to 1938, who collected a .321 batting average with 2,299 hits and led the Major Leagues in stolen bases four times being a member of the National League pennant-winning Pittsburgh Pirates and Chicago Cubs clubs, while leaving a definitive legacy when he hit a two-run, two-out double off Washington Senators pitcher Walter Johnson in the eighth inning of Game 7 of the 1925 World Series for a 9–7 lead, clinching the series title for the Pirates; coach for Cubs (1941–1943) and Boston Red Sox (1949 until his death).
  - Hank Griffin, 63, pitcher who played from 1911 to 1912 for the Chicago Cubs and Boston Braves.
  - Paul Meloan, 61, right fielder who played with the Chicago White Sox and St. Louis Browns between 1910 and 1911.
- February 17 – Jack Dalton, 64, outfielder who became one of only a few players to see action in three different Major Leagues, while playing with the Brooklyn Superbas and Dodgers of the National League, as well as for the Buffalo Blues of the outlaw Federal League and the Detroit Tigers of the American League in part of four seasons spanning 1910–1916.

=== March ===
- March 5 – Effie Norton, 76, pitcher who played from 1896 to 1897 for the Washington Senators of the National League.
- March 7 – Joe Brown, 49, pitcher who played for the Chicago White Sox in 1927.
- March 11 – William Gallagher, 76, shortstop and catcher who played for the Philadelphia Phillies in 1896.
- March 13 – George Young, 60, pinch-hitter who played in two games for the Cleveland Naps in 1913.
- March 16 – Nubs Kleinke, 38, pitcher for the St. Louis Cardinals in part of two seasons from 1936 to 1938.
- March 22 – Slim Sallee, 65, pitcher who posted a lifetime mark of 174-143 and a 2.56 ERA for the St. Louis Cardinals, Cincinnati Reds and New York Giants in span of 14 seasons from 1908 through 1921, helping Cincinnati clinch the 1919 World Series and the Giants win the National League pennant in 1917.
- March 24 – Bert Lewis, 54, pitcher for the 1924 Philadelphia Phillies.
- March 25 – Pussy Tebeau, 80, outfielder who played briefly for the Cleveland Spiders during the 1895 season.
- March 27 – Fred Frank, 77, outfielder for the 1898 Cleveland Spiders.
- March 28:
  - Henry Clarke, 74, pitcher for the Cleveland Spiders in 1897 and the Chicago Orphans in 1898, who also coached at college for the Michigan Wolverines baseball team, and later served as a Nebraska state legislator and railroad commissioner.
  - Ernie Ross, 69, Canadian pitcher who appeared in two games with the original Baltimore Orioles of the American League in their 1902 season.

=== April ===
- April 2 – Doc Sechrist, 74, pitcher who played for the New York Giants in its 1899 season
- April 9 – John McDonald, 67, pitcher for the 1907 Washington Senators.
- April 11 – Dick McCabe, 54, who pitched for the Boston Red Sox in the 1918 season and the Chicago White Sox in 1922.
- April 19 – Dusty Miller, 73, outfielder for the 1902 Chicago Orphans of the National League.
- April 22 – Dave Pickett, 75, outfielder who played for the Boston Beaneaters in 1898.
- April 23:
  - Bill Hallman, 74, outfielder who played with the Milwaukee Brewers and Chicago White Sox in part of four seasons between 1901 and 1907.
  - Dike Varney, 69, pitcher for the 1902 Cleveland Bronchos of the American League.
- April 25 – Offa Neal, 73, third baseman who appeared in four games with the New York Giants in 1905, and also spent 12 seasons in the Minor Leagues as a player, coach or manager.
- April 30 – Tom Niland, 80, outfielder for the 1896 St. Louis Browns of the National League.

=== May ===
- May 2 – Jo-Jo Morrissey, 46, infielder who played for the Cincinnati Reds and the Chicago White Sox in part of three seasons between 1932 and 1936.
- May 3 – Jim Galloway, 62, second baseman who played for the St. Louis Cardinals in 1912 and served in World War I, then returned to baseball in 1920 to play ten more seasons, retiring in 1929 at the age 41.
- May 4 – Vince Molyneaux, 61, pitcher who played from 1917 to 1918 for the St. Louis Browns and Boston Red Sox.
- May 9 – Art Watson, 66, catcher who played from 1914 to 1915 for the Brooklyn Tip-Tops and Buffalo Blues clubs of the outlaw Federal League.
- May 19 – Wattie Holm, 48, fourth outfielder who played with the St. Louis Cardinals in a span of seven seasons from 1924 to 1932, as well for the 1926 World Champion Cardinals.
- May 23 – Ernie Groth, 65, pitcher for the 1904 Chicago Cubs.

=== June ===
- June 4:
  - Dan Griner, 62, pitcher who played for the St. Louis Cardinals and Brooklyn Robins in all or part of seven seasons spanning 1912–1916.
  - Dean Sturgis, 57, backup catcher for the Philadelphia Athletics during the 1914 season.
- June 6 – Walt Thomas, 66, shortstop who appeared in six games for the 1908 Boston Doves of the National League.
- June 8 – Ledell Titcomb, 83, pitcher who played with four teams in the National League and American Association in four seasons from 1886 to 1890, sporting a record of 30-28 with a 3.47 ERA in 63 games, while pitching a no-hitter against the Syracuse Stars in 1890.
- June 28 – Mutz Ens, 65, first baseman who played for the Chicago White Sox in its 1912 season.
- June 30:
  - Paul Fitzke, 49, pitcher for the Cleveland Indians in 1924, who also played in the National Football League for the Frankford Yellow Jackets in 1925.
  - Joe Lake, 69, pitcher who played from 1908 through 1913 for the New York Highlanders, St. Louis Browns and Chicago Cubs.

=== July ===
- July 2 – Joe Gormley, 83, pitcher for the Philadelphia Phillies during the 1891 National League season.
- July 3 – Ed Donalds, 67, pitcher who played briefly for the Cincinnati Reds in 1912.
- July 5 – Joe Sargent, 56, middle infielder and third baseman who appeared in 66 games with the Detroit Tigers in 1921.
- July 10 – John L. Smith, 61, pharmaceutical executive (Pfizer) who had been a co-owner and one of four equal partners in the Brooklyn Dodgers since 1945.
- July 15 – Biddy Dolan, 69, first baseman who played in 1914 for the Indianapolis Hoosiers of the Federal League.
- July 17 – Fred Blanding, 62, pitcher who posted a record of 46–46 with a 3.13 ERA for the Cleveland Naps in five seasons from 1910 to 1914.
- July 18 – Art LaVigne, 65, catcher who played for the Buffalo Buffeds of the Federal League in its 1914 season.
- July 23 – Bill Lange, 79, center fielder who played his entire seven-year career for the Chicago Colts and Orphans of the National League from 1893 through 1899, collecting a .330 batting average with 400 stolen bases in 813 games and ranking in several season categories, including average, home runs, RBI, runs scored and stolen bases, while leading the league with 73 steals in 1897.

=== August ===
- August 4:
  - John Burke, 73, pitcher for the 1902 New York Giants.
  - Harry Coveleski, 64, left-handed pitcher for the Philadelphia Phillies, Cincinnati Reds and Detroit Tigers over nine seasons from 1907 to 1918, a three-time 20-game winner who is best remembered for his rookie season with the Phillies in 1908, when he defeated the powerful New York Giants three times in a span of five days at the end of the season, to deny John McGraw's squad the 1908 National League pennant, which forced a replay of the infamous Merkle's Boner game.
- August 9 – Ed Klepfer, 62, spitball pitcher who played for the New York Yankees, Chicago White Sox and Cleveland Indians in a span of six seasons between 1911 and 1919.
- August 10 – Leo Kavanagh, 56, shortstop who played for the Chicago Whales of the outlaw Federal League in its 1914 season.
- August 11 – Frank Smykal, 60, shortstop for the 1916 Pittsburgh Pirates.
- August 17:
  - Pit Gilman, 86, backup outfielder who played with the Cleveland Blues in its 1884 season.
  - Paddy O'Connor, 71, Irish catcher who played for the Pittsburgh Pirates, St. Louis Cardinals, Pittsburgh Rebels and New York Yankees over six seasons spanning 1908–1918.
- August 20 – Ed Zmich, 65, pitcher who played with the St. Louis Cardinals from 1910 to 1911.
- August 25 – George Disch, 71, pitcher for the 1905 Detroit Tigers.
- August 29 – Doc Ralston, 65, fourth outfielder for the Washington Senators in their 1910 season.

=== September ===
- September 1 – Frank Pearce, 45, pitcher who played from 1933 through 1935 for the Philadelphia Phillies.
- September 3 – Jim Connor, 87, second baseman for the Chicago Colts and Orphans clubs of the National League in part of three seasons spanning 1892–1899, who also spent six years in the Minor Leagues, including a stint as player/manager for the Newburgh Hillies of the Hudson River League in its 1907 season.
- September 14 – Billy Ging, 77, pitcher for the 1889 Boston Beaneaters of the National League.
- September 15 – Joe Knotts, 66. backup catcher who played in 1907 with the Boston Doves of the National League.
- September 17 – Jerry Hurley, 87, catcher who played for the Boston Beaneaters in the National League in 1889, the Pittsburgh Burghers in the Players' League in 1890, and the Cincinnati Kelly's Killers of the American Association in 1891.
- September 21 – Duke Kenworthy, 64, second baseman who spent four seasons in the Major Leagues, including stints in the American League with the Washington Senators in 1912 and the St. Louis Browns in 1917. and for the Kansas City Packers of the short-lived Federal League from 1914 to 1915.
- September 23 – Sam Barry, 57, collegiate athletic coach who achieved significant accomplishments in three major sports, as well as one of the principal forces behind the creation of the College World Series, which his team won in 1948.
- September 25 – Pep Deininger, 72, German pitcher and center fielder who played for the Boston Americans and Philadelphia Phillies in part of three seasons spanning 1902–1909.
- September 26 – John Scheneberg, 62, who pitched with the Pittsburgh Pirates in the 1913 season and for the St. Louis Browns in 1920.
- September 28 – George Paynter, 79, outfielder who played in 1894 for the St. Louis Browns of the National League.
- September 30:
  - Ned Crompton, 61, English outfielder who played with the St. Louis Browns of the American League during the 1909 season, and later appeared in one game for the Cincinnati Reds of the National League in 1910.
  - Jack Harper, who pitched for five teams in an eight-year career between 1889 and 1906, sporting an 80–64 record and 3.55 ERA in 158 games, including two 23-win seasons with the St. Louis Cardinals in 1901 and the Cincinnati Reds in 1904.

=== October ===
- October 1 – Red Howell, 41, pinch hitter for 1941 Cleveland Indians, reaching base six times in 11 plate appearances (four walks and two singles); in his 17-year minor-league career (1928–1944) as an outfielder, he collected 2,509 hits and 229 homers in 2,121 career games, batting .326.
- October 14 – Jocko Fields, 50, outfielder who played from 1887 through 1891 for the Pittsburgh Alleghenys, Burghers and Pirates teams, as well as for the Philadelphia Phillies in 1891 and the New York Giants in 1892.
- October 17 – Tom Tuckey, 66, pitcher who played for the Boston Doves in the 1908 and 1909 seasons.
- October 19 – Lefty Gervais, 60, pitcher for the 1913 Boston Braves.

=== November ===
- November 4 – Grover Cleveland Alexander, 63, Hall of Fame pitcher who played for the Philadelphia Phillies, Chicago Cubs and St. Louis Cardinals over 20 seasons (1911 through 1930), winning three pitchers' triple crowns (1915–1916; 1920) and setting a modern record for a rookie with 28 wins (1911), while collecting three seasons with 30-plus wins and leading the National League in wins (six times), strikeouts (six), earned run average (four) and shutouts (six), being also instrumental in leading the Phillies to their first pennant in 1915 and the Cardinals to the 1926 World Series Championship striking out Tony Lazzeri with the bases loaded in decisive Game 7 at Yankee Stadium; portrayed by actor Ronald Reagan in 1952 biopic The Winning Team.
- November 5 – Bill Johnson, 58, outfielder for the 1916 Philadelphia Athletics.
- November 6 – Martin Glendon, 71, pitcher who played from 1902 to 1903 with the Cincinnati Reds and the Cleveland Naps.
- November 14 – Jack McAleese, 72, pitcher who appeared in just one game with the Chicago White Stockings in the 1901 season.
- November 16 – Frank Hemphill, 72, outfielder who played for the Chicago White Sox in the 1906 season and the Washington Senators in 1909.

=== December ===
- December 1 – Bob Hall, 71, who played some outfield and infield utility positions with the Philadelphia Phillies, New York Giants and Brooklyn Superbas between 1904 and 1905.
- December 5 – Bill Dahlen, 80, one of the finest shortstops between 1891 and 1911 as well as a reliable hitter and aggressive baserunner, whose leadership helped the 1905 New York Giants win the World Series title, ending his career with 2,461 hits and 548 stolen bases, and having played more games than any player in Major League history, with 2,444.
- December 6 – Jing Johnson, 56, pitcher who played for the Philadelphia Athletics in all or part of five seasons spanning 1916–1928.
- December 9 – Mickey Corcoran, 68, second baseman who appeared in 14 games for the 1910 Cincinnati Reds; prolific minor-league base-stealer who swiped 384 bags in 1,875 games played.
- December 19 – Wingo Anderson, 64, pitcher for the Cincinnati Reds in its 1910 season.
- December 20 – Carroll Yerkes, 47, who pitched for the Philadelphia Athletics and Chicago Cubs over the course of five seasons between 1927 and 1933.
- December 21 – Dad Lytle, 88, second baseman and outfielder who split time with the Chicago Colts and the Pittsburgh Alleghenys during their 1890 season.
- December 22 – Rip Egan, 79, pitcher who appeared in one game with the Washington Senators of the National League in 1894, and later managed in the Minor Leagues and worked as an umpire in the American League from 1907 to 1914.
- December 22 – Cal Vasbinder, 70, pitcher who played in 1902 for the Cleveland Bronchos of the American League.
