= 1910 Cincinnati Reds season =

1910 Cincinnati Reds
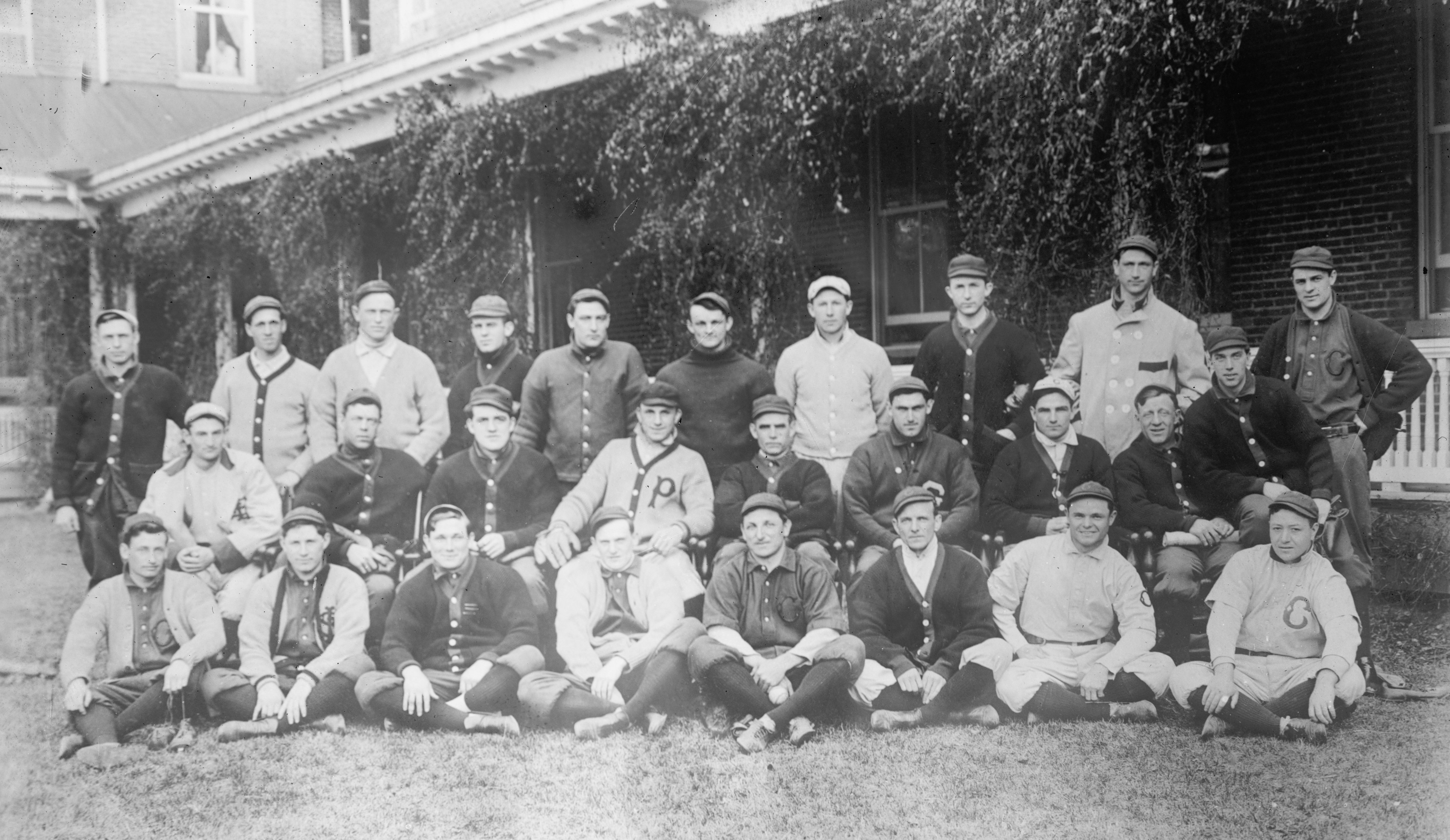
- League: National League
- Ballpark: Palace of the Fans
- City: Cincinnati
- Owners: Garry Herrmann
- Managers: Clark Griffith

The 1910 Cincinnati Reds season was a season in American baseball. The Reds finished fifth in the National League with a record of 75–79.

== Offseason ==
On January 20, the Reds traded pitchers Bob Ewing and Ad Brennan to the Philadelphia Phillies, receiving pitchers Frank Corridon and Harry Coveleski. Corridon had a record of 11–9 with a 2.11 ERA in 27 games, while Coveleski had a 6–10 record with a 2.74 ERA in 24 games in the 1909 season.

Corridon would not stay with Cincinnati, as he was traded a couple of weeks later, with second baseman Miller Huggins and outfielder Rebel Oakes to the St. Louis Cardinals, getting pitcher Fred Beebe and infielder Alan Storke. Beebe was the Cardinals ace in 1909, going 15–21 with a 2.82 ERA in 44 games. As a rookie in 1906, Beebe led the National League in strikeouts with 171.

=== Transactions ===
Transactions by the Cincinnati Reds during the off-season before the 1910 season.

==== December 1909 ====
December 15	Sold 3B Cozy Dolan player rights to Denver Grizzlies of Western League.

==== January 1910 ====
January 19	Sold 1B Doc Johnston player rights to Buffalo Bisons of Eastern League.
January 20	Acquired RHP Frank Corridon and LHP Harry Coveleski from Philadelphia Phillies for LHP Ad Brennan and RHP Bob Ewing.

==== February 1910 ====
February 3	Acquired RHP Fred Beebe and SS Alan Storke from St. Louis Cardinals for RHP Frank Corridon, 2B Miller Huggins and CF Rebel Oakes.

== Regular season ==
The Reds were led offensively by outfielder Mike Mitchell, who in 156 games, hit .286 with a team high five home runs an 86 RBI. Fellow outfielder Bob Bescher hit .250, but had a team high 70 stolen bases. First baseman Dick Hoblitzell continued to become a star, hitting .278 with four home runs and 70 RBI in 155 games. Catcher Larry McLean had a very solid season, batting .298 with two home runs and 71 RBI in 127 games.

The pitching staff was anchored by George Suggs, who led the Reds with a 20–12 record with a 2.40 ERA in 35 games, in which he threw 23 complete games. Harry Gaspar had a very good season, as he went 15–17 with a 2.59 ERA in 48 games in a team high 275 innings pitched. Jack Rowan was a solid third starter, going 14–13 with a 2.93 ERA in 42 games. Newly acquired Fred Beebe finished 12–14 with a 3.07 ERA in 35 games in his first season with the team.

=== Season summary ===
After a poor 3–6 start to the season in their first nine games, the Reds rebounded and went 13–5 in their next 18 games, improving their record to 16–11, good for second place in the National League, only a half game behind the Pittsburgh Pirates for first place. It would be the closest the team would get to first place, as the club fell out of the pennant race as the season went on. Cincinnati struggled to a 75–79 record, finishing 29 games behind the first place Chicago Cubs.

=== Season standings ===
National League
Team	W	L	Pct.	GB	Home	Road
Chicago Cubs	104	50	.675	—	58‍–‍19	46‍–‍31
New York Giants	91	63	.591	13	52‍–‍26	39‍–‍37
Pittsburgh Pirates	86	67	.562	17½	46‍–‍30	40‍–‍37
Philadelphia Phillies	78	75	.510	25½	40‍–‍36	38‍–‍39
Cincinnati Reds	75	79	.487	29	39‍–‍37	36‍–‍42
Brooklyn Superbas	64	90	.416	40	39‍–‍39	25‍–‍51
St. Louis Cardinals	63	90	.412	40½	35‍–‍41	28‍–‍49
Boston Doves	53	100	.346	50½	29‍–‍48	24‍–‍52

=== Record vs. opponents ===
1910 National League record Sources:
Team	BSN	BRO	CHC	CIN	NYG	PHI	PIT	STL
Boston	—	10–12	5–17	8–14–1	6–16–1	4–17–2	8–14	12–10
Brooklyn	12–10	—	6–16	7–15	8–14	9–13–1	10–12–1	12–10
Chicago	17–5	16–6	—	16–6	14–8	14–8	12–10	15–7
Cincinnati	14–8–1	15–7	6–16	—	8–14	10–12–1	10–12	12–10
New York	16–6–1	14–8	8–14	14–8	—	15–7	12–10	12–10
Philadelphia	17–4–2	13–9–1	8–14	12–10–1	7–15	—	11–11	10–12
Pittsburgh	14–8	12–10–1	10–12	12–10	10–12	11–11	—	17–4
St. Louis	10–12	10–12	7–15	10–12	10–12	12–10	4–17	—

=== Transactions ===
Transactions by the Cincinnati Reds during the 1910 season.

==== May 1910 ====
May 31	Purchased RHP Slow Joe Doyle from New York Highlanders for $2,000.

==== June 1910 ====
Unknown	Signed free agent OF Al Wickland.
June 5	Selected SS Tommy McMillan off waivers from Brooklyn Superbas.
June 7	Purchased LHP Bill Burns from Chicago White Sox for $4,000.
June 10	Acquired 3B Sam Woodruff from Louisville Colonels of American Association for 3B Jim Doyle and IF Rabbit Robinson.
June 15	RHP Bob Spade selected by St. Louis Browns off waivers.
June 17	Purchased LHP Rube Benton from Macon Peaches of South Atlantic League for $7,000.

==== August 1910 ====
August 1	Purchased 2B Mickey Corcoran from Buffalo Bisons of Eastern League.

==== September 1910 ====
September 1	Drafted 2B Dave Altizer from Minneapolis Millers of American Association in Rule 5 Draft. Drafted LHP Barney Schreiber from Denver Grizzlies of Western League.
September 20	OF Ward Miller player rights sold to Montreal Royals of Eastern League.

=== Roster ===
1910 Cincinnati Reds
Roster
Pitchers: Wingo Anderson; Fred Beebe; Rube Benton; Bill Burns; Tom Cantwell; Roy Castleton; Harry Coveleski; Slow Joe Doyle; Art Fromme; Harry Gaspar; Jack Rowan; Walt Slagle; Bob Spade; George Suggs; Mysterious Walker	Catchers: Tommy Clarke; Larry McLean; Frank Roth; Infielders: Dave Altizer; Chappy Charles; Mickey Corcoran; Tom Downey; Jim Doyle; Dick Egan; Dick Hoblitzel; Mike Konnick; Hans Lobert; Tommy McMillan; Bob Meinke; Art Phelan; Rabbit Robinson; Sam Woodruff	Outfielders: Bob Bescher; Ned Crompton; Swat McCabe; Ward Miller; Mike Mitchell; Dode Paskert; Other positions: Joe Burns; Clark Griffith; George Wheeler	Manager: Clark Griffith

== Player stats ==
=== Batting ===
==== Starters by position ====
Note: Pos = Position; G = Games played; AB = At bats; H = Hits; Avg. = Batting average; HR = Home runs; RBI = Runs batted in

Pos	Player	G	AB	H	Avg.	HR	RBI
C	Larry McLean	127	423	126	.298	2	71
1B	Dick Hoblitzell	155	611	170	.278	4	70
2B	Dick Egan	135	474	116	.245	0	46
SS	Tommy McMillan	82	248	46	.185	0	13
3B	Hans Lobert	93	314	97	.309	3	40
OF	Bob Bescher	150	589	147	.250	4	48
OF	Dode Paskert	144	506	152	.300	2	46
OF	Mike Mitchell	156	583	167	.286	5	88

==== Other batters ====
Note: G = Games played; AB = At bats; H = Hits; Avg. = Batting average; HR = Home runs; RBI = Runs batted in

Player	G	AB	H	Avg.	HR	RBI
Tom Downey	111	378	102	.270	2	32
Tommy Clarke	64	151	42	.278	1	20
Ward Miller	81	126	30	.238	0	10
Sam Woodruff	21	61	9	.148	0	2
Mickey Corcoran	14	46	10	.217	0	7
Art Phelan	23	42	9	.214	0	4
Swat McCabe	13	35	9	.257	0	5
Frank Roth	26	29	7	.241	0	3
Chappy Charles	4	15	2	.133	0	0
Jim Doyle	7	13	2	.154	0	1
Dave Altizer	3	10	6	.600	0	0
Rabbit Robinson	8	7	0	.000	0	1
Mike Konnick	1	3	0	.000	0	0
George Wheeler	3	3	0	.000	0	0
Ned Crompton	1	2	0	.000	0	0
Bob Meinke	2	1	0	.000	0	0
Joe Burns	1	1	1	1.000	0	0
Clark Griffith	1	0	0	----	0	0

=== Pitching ===
==== Starting pitchers ====
Note: G = Games pitched; IP = Innings pitched; W = Wins; L = Losses; ERA = Earned run average; SO = Strikeouts

Player	G	IP	W	L	ERA	SO
George Suggs	35	266.0	20	12	2.40	91
Jack Rowan	42	261.0	12	14	3.07	93
Fred Beebe	35	214.1	12	14	3.07	93
Bob Spade	3	17.1	1	2	6.75	1

==== Other pitchers ====
Note: G = Games pitched; IP = Innings pitched; W = Wins; L = Losses; ERA = Earned run average; SO = Strikeouts

Player	G	IP	W	L	ERA	SO
Harry Gaspar	48	275.0	15	17	2.59	74
Bill Burns	31	178.2	8	13	3.48	57
Art Fromme	11	49.1	3	4	2.92	10
Harry Coveleski	7	39.1	1	1	5.26	27
Rube Benton	12	38.0	0	1	4.74	15
Wingo Anderson	7	17.1	0	0	4.67	11
Roy Castleton	4	13.2	1	2	3.29	5

==== Relief pitchers ====
Note: G = Games pitched; W = Wins; L = Losses; SV = Saves; ERA = Earned run average; SO = Strikeouts

Player	G	W	L	SV	ERA	SO
Slow Joe Doyle	5	0	0	0	6.35	4
Tom Cantwell	2	0	0	0	13.50	0
Mysterious Walker	1	0	0	0	3.00	1
Walt Slagle	1	0	0	0	9.00	0
