= Charles Harding =

Charles Harding may refer to:

- Charles Barney Harding (1899–1979), American financier
- Charles R. Harding (1867–1944), English sculler
- Charlie Harding (1891–1971), Major League Baseball pitcher
