= Meinke =

Meinke is a surname. Notable people with the surname include:

- Bob Meinke (1887–1952), American baseball player
- Frank Meinke (1863–1931), American baseball player
- Katrin Meinke (born 1979), German cyclist
- Nina Meinke (born 1993), German boxer
- Peter Meinke (born 1932), American author
