= Joseph Burns (baseball) =

American baseball player (1889–1987)

- Outfielder
- Born: March 26, 1889; Ipswich, Massachusetts, U.S.
- Died: July 12, 1987 (aged 98); Beverly, Massachusetts, U.S.
- Batted: Left Threw: Left

MLB debut
- June 19, 1910, for the Cincinnati Reds

Last MLB appearance
- September 23, 1913, for the Detroit Tigers

MLB statistics
- Batting average: .429
- Home runs: 0
- Runs batted in: 1
- Stats at Baseball Reference

Teams
- Cincinnati Reds (1910); Detroit Tigers (1913)

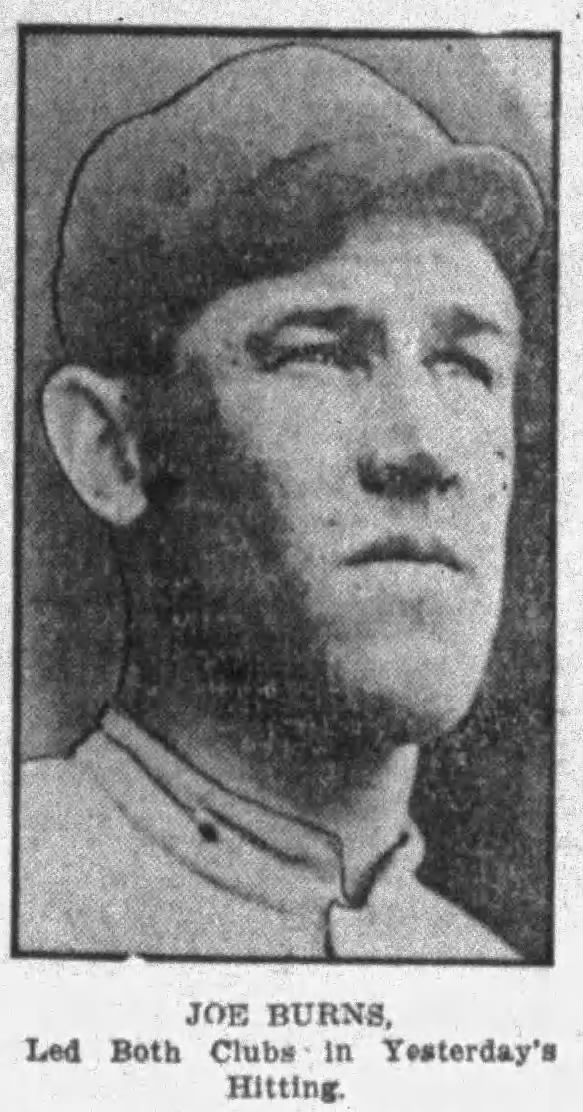

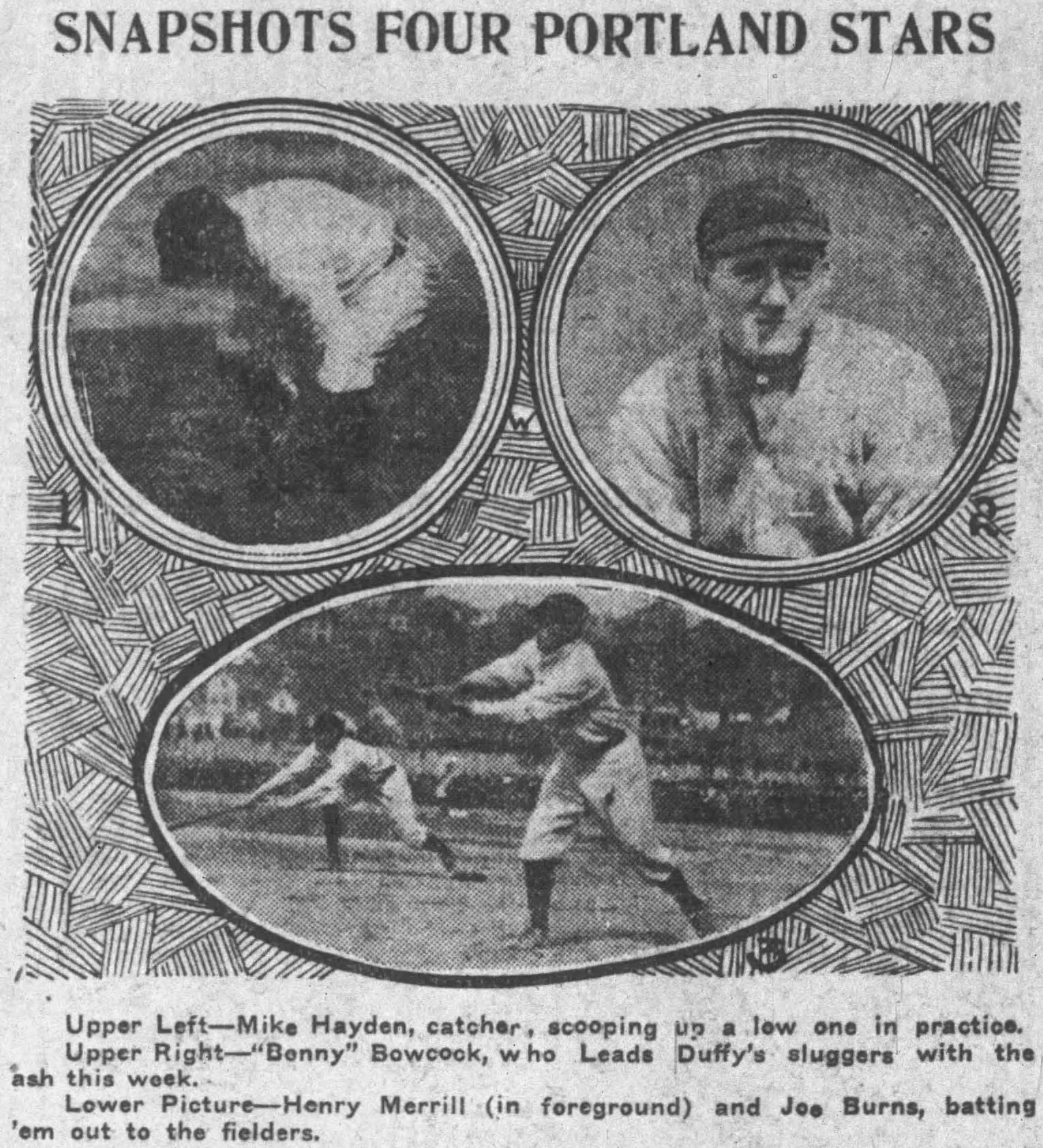

Joseph Francis Burns (March 26, 1889 – July 12, 1987) was an American Major League Baseball outfielder. He played in one game for the 1910 Cincinnati Reds and four games for the 1913 Detroit Tigers. He continued to play in the minor leagues until 1925, playing primarily in centerfield. While playing in his final season for the 1925 Bridgeport Bears, he was described by writer Tom Murphy in the Portland Evening Express as follows: "Joe is one of those unostentatious performers who do a great deal without much ado." In 1975, he was inducted into the Maine Baseball Hall of Fame.

== Sources ==
- Career statistics from Baseball Reference · Baseball Reference (Minors) · Retrosheet · Baseball Almanac
