= Erwin Renfer =

American baseball player (1891–1957)

- Pitcher
- Born: December 11, 1891; Elgin, Illinois, U.S.
- Died: October 26, 1957 (aged 65); Sycamore, Illinois, U.S.
- Batted: Right Threw: Right

MLB debut
- September 18, 1913, for the Detroit Tigers

Last MLB appearance
- September 18, 1913, for the Detroit Tigers

MLB statistics
- Games pitched: 1
- Earned run average: 6.00
- Innings pitched: 6.0
- Stats at Baseball Reference

Teams
- Detroit Tigers (1913)

Erwin Arthur Renfer (December 11, 1891 – October 26, 1957) was an American professional baseball pitcher from 1910 to 1915. He compiled a 61–35 record in 131 minor league games, and he also appeared in one game in Major League Baseball for the Detroit Tigers in September 1913.

Renfer was born in Elgin, Illinois, in 1891 and attended Virginia Polytechnic Institute and State University (Virginia Tech). In October 1910, at age 18, he was included on the reserve list of the Detroit Tigers. In May 1911, the Tigers assigned Renfer to play with the Saginaw Krazy Kats club of the Southern Michigan League. At age 19, Renfer appeared in 34 games and compiled a 15–10 record for Saginaw during the 1911 season. In January 1912, Frank Navin, president of the Detroit Tigers, announced that the team had given Renfer his outright release.

Renfer spent most of the 1912 and 1913 seasons playing for the Ottawa Senators in the Canadian League. He appeared in 52 games for Ottawa, compiling a 34–10 record in 1912 and 1913. He also appeared in six Central League games for the Fort Wayne Railroaders during the 1912 season.

At the end of August 1913, Renfer was purchased by the Detroit Tigers. In his sole appearance in Major League Baseball, on September 18, 1913, Renfer pitched six innings and gave up four earned runs for a career earned run average of 6.00.

After his short stint with the Detroit Tigers, Renfer played two seasons in the Southern Association. In 1914, he appeared in 31 games for the Nashville Volunteers and compiled a 9–11 record. He concluded his professional baseball career in 1915 with the Memphis Chickasaws, compiling a 2–2 record in eight games.

Renfer died in Sycamore, Illinois, in 1957 at age 65. He was buried at the Bluff City Cemetery in Elgin, Illinois.
