= Sam Woodruff =

American baseball player (1876–1937)

- Third baseman
- Born: December 27, 1876; Chilo, Ohio, U.S.
- Died: July 22, 1937 (aged 60); Cincinnati, Ohio, U.S.
- Batted: Right Threw: Right

MLB debut
- April 14, 1904, for the Cincinnati Reds

Last MLB appearance
- July 17, 1910, for the Cincinnati Reds

MLB statistics
- Batting average: .183
- Home runs: 0
- Runs batted in: 22
- Stats at Baseball Reference

Teams
- Cincinnati Reds (1904, 1910)

Orville Francis "Sam" Woodruff (December 27, 1876 – July 22, 1937) was an American professional baseball player. He played all of the 1904 season and part of the 1910 season for the Cincinnati Reds, primarily as a third baseman. He also had an extensive minor league baseball career, playing from 1898 until 1915.
