= Fred Frank =

American baseball player (1873–1950)

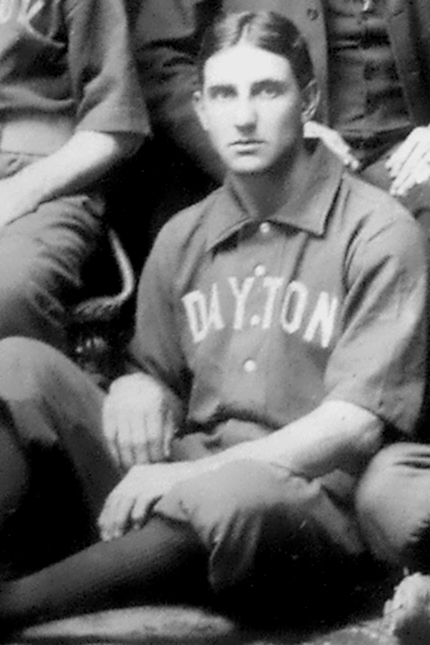
- Outfielder
- Born: March 11, 1873; Louisa, Kentucky, U.S.
- Died: March 27, 1950 (aged 77); Ashland, Kentucky, U.S.
- Batted: Unknown Threw: Unknown

MLB debut
- September 27, 1898, for the Cleveland Spiders

Last MLB appearance
- October 15, 1898, for the Cleveland Spiders

MLB statistics
- Batting average: .208
- Home runs: 0
- Runs batted in: 3
- Stats at Baseball Reference

Teams
- Cleveland Spiders (1898)

John Frederick Frank (March 11, 1873 – March 27, 1950) was an American outfielder in Major League Baseball for the Cleveland Spiders in 1898. He played through 1903 in the minor leagues.
