= Charlie Grover =

American baseball player (1890–1971)

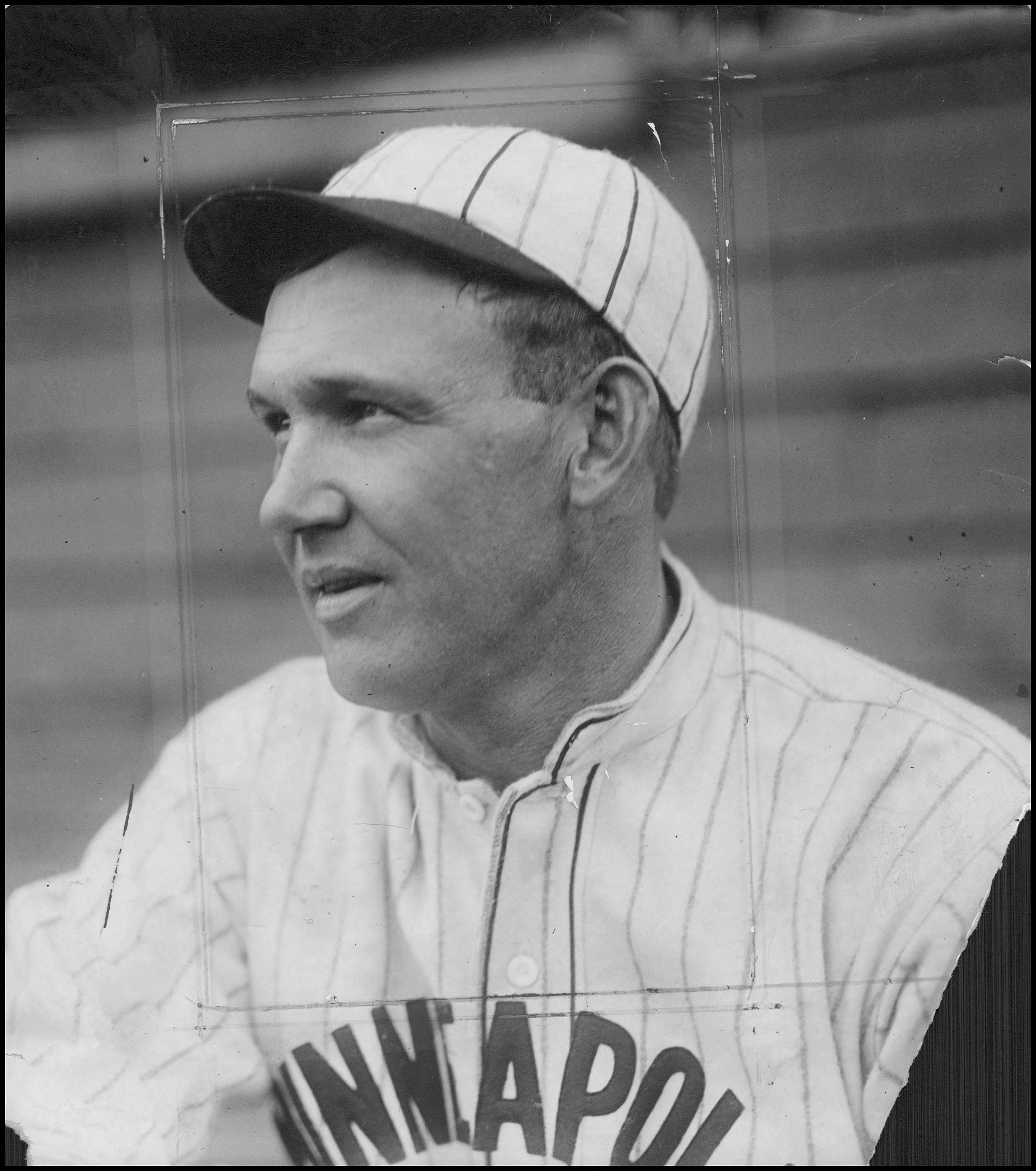
- Pitcher
- Born: June 20, 1890; Gallipolis, Ohio, US
- Died: May 24, 1971 (aged 80); Emmett Township, Michigan, US
- Batted: Right Threw: Right

MLB debut
- September 9, 1913, for the Detroit Tigers

Last MLB appearance
- September 12, 1913, for the Detroit Tigers

MLB statistics
- Win–loss record: 0–0
- Earned run average: 3.38
- Strikeouts: 2
- Stats at Baseball Reference

Teams
- Detroit Tigers (1913)

Charles Byrd "Bugs" Grover (June 20, 1890 – May 24, 1971) was an American Major League Baseball pitcher. Grover played for the Detroit Tigers in 1913. In two career games, he had a 0–0 record with a 3.38 ERA. He batted left-handed and threw right-handed.

Grover was born in Gallipolis, Ohio, and died in Emmett Township, Michigan.
