= George Disch =

American baseball player (1879–1950)

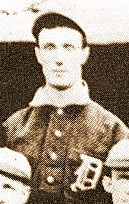
- Pitcher
- Born: March 15, 1879; Lincoln, Missouri, U.S.
- Died: August 25, 1950 (aged 71); Rapid City, South Dakota, U.S.
- Batted: Unknown Threw: Right

MLB debut
- August 8, 1905, for the Detroit Tigers

Last MLB appearance
- October 3, 1905, for the Detroit Tigers

MLB statistics
- Win–loss record: 0–2
- Earned run average: 2.64
- Strikeouts: 14
- Stats at Baseball Reference

Teams
- Detroit Tigers (1905)

George Charles Disch (March 15, 1879 – August 25, 1950) was an American pitcher in Major League Baseball. He played for the Detroit Tigers in 1905.
