= Joe Peploski =

American baseball player (1891–1972)

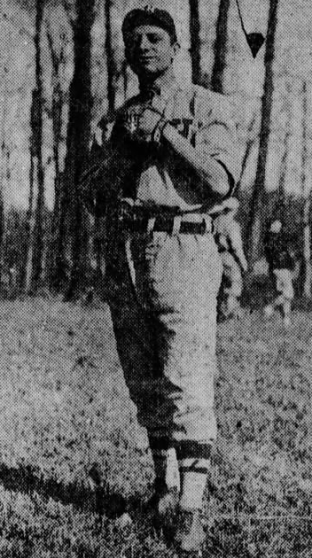
- Peploski with Seton Hall in the Newark Star-Eagle c. 1912
- Third Baseman / Pitcher
- Born: September 12, 1891; Brooklyn, New York, U.S.
- Died: July 13, 1972 (aged 80); New York City, U.S.
- Batted: Right Threw: Right

MLB debut
- June 24, 1913, for the Detroit Tigers

Last MLB appearance
- June 26, 1913, for the Detroit Tigers

MLB statistics
- Batting average: .500
- Home runs: 0
- Runs batted in: 0
- Stats at Baseball Reference

Teams
- Detroit Tigers (1913)

Joseph Aloysius Peploski (September 12, 1891 – July 13, 1972), sometimes referred to as "Pepper Peploski", was an American baseball player. He played college baseball for Seton Hall University in 1912 and 1913. He later played professional baseball for two years in 1913 and 1914, including two games in Major League Baseball as a third baseman for the Detroit Tigers in June 1913.

== Early years ==
Peploski was born in Brooklyn in 1891. He attended Seton Hall University in South Orange, New Jersey where he played baseball as a pitcher in 1912 and 1913. Peploski was 5 ft 8 in (1.73 m) tall, weighed 158 pounds, and was a right-handed batter and thrower.

== Professional baseball ==
Peploski played minor league baseball in the summer of 1912 as a pitcher for Brattleboro. After graduating from Seton Hall in 1913, he joined the Detroit Tigers. He appeared in only two games for the Tigers, both as a third baseman, on June 24 and June 26, 1913. He had two hits in four at bats for a .500 batting average and scored a run. He finished the 1913 season as a third baseman for the Lincoln Railsplitters in the Western League. He continued to play in the minor leagues in 1914 for Lawrence and Haverhill in the New England League.

== Family and later years ==
Peploski's younger brother, Henry Peploski, was born in Poland in 1905 and played third base for the Boston Braves in 1929. Henry, who was nicknamed "Pep" Peploski, played in six major league games, four more than his older brother. Joe Peploski died in New York City in 1972 at age 80. He is buried at Rosedale Cemetery in Linden, New Jersey.
