= Ottawa Senators (disambiguation) =

The Ottawa Senators are a team in the National Hockey League that has played since 1992.

Ottawa Senators may refer to:

== Hockey ==
- Ottawa Senators (original), senior-level team which played from 1883, and operated as the NHL Senators until 1934
- Ottawa Senators (senior hockey), senior-level amateur/semi-pro team which won the Allan Cup in 1949
- Ottawa Senators (FHL), professional team which played in 1908–09
- Ottawa Jr. Senators, junior A team, founded in 1979
- Ottawa Lady Senators, women's hockey team in the Provincial Women's Hockey League

== Other uses ==
- Ottawa Rough Riders, a Canadian football team that played under the name "Ottawa Senators" between 1925 and 1930
- Ottawa Senators, a baseball team in the Canadian League from 1912 to 1915
- Ottawa Senators, a baseball team in the Canadian–American League in 1936

== See also ==
- Senate of Canada, the upper house of the Parliament of Canada, located in Ottawa
