= Fred House (baseball) =

American baseball player (1890–1923)

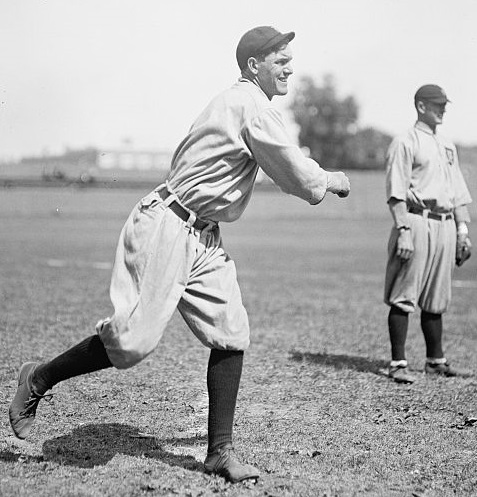
- Pitcher
- Born: October 3, 1890; Cabool, Missouri
- Died: November 16, 1923 (aged 33); Kansas City, Missouri
- Batted: Right Threw: Right

MLB debut
- April 22, 1913, for the Detroit Tigers

Last MLB appearance
- October 1, 1913, for the Detroit Tigers

MLB statistics
- Win–loss record: 1–2
- Earned run average: 5.20
- Strikeouts: 16
- Stats at Baseball Reference

Teams
- Detroit Tigers (1913)

Willard Edwin "Fred" House (October 3, 1890 – November 16, 1923) was a Major League Baseball pitcher who played for the Detroit Tigers in 1913.

He died in Kansas City, Missouri in 1923 of appendicitis.
