= Les Hennessy =

American baseball player (1893–1976)

- Second baseman
- Born: December 12, 1893; Lynn, Massachusetts, U.S.
- Died: November 20, 1976 (aged 82); New York, New York, U.S.
- Batted: Right Threw: Right

MLB debut
- June 4, 1913, for the Detroit Tigers

Last MLB appearance
- July 20, 1913, for the Detroit Tigers

MLB statistics
- Games played: 14
- At bats: 22
- Hits: 3
- Stats at Baseball Reference

Teams
- Detroit Tigers (1913)

Lester Baker Hennessy (December 12, 1893 – November 20, 1976) was an American second baseman in Major League Baseball. He played for the Detroit Tigers.

Hennessy attended Lafayette College, where he played football and baseball.
