= Jack Baker (baseball) =

American baseball player (born 1950)

- First baseman
- Born: May 4, 1950 (age 75); Birmingham, Alabama
- Batted: Right Threw: Right

MLB debut
- September 11, 1976, for the Boston Red Sox

Last MLB appearance
- June 8, 1977, for the Boston Red Sox

MLB statistics
- Batting average: .115
- Home runs: 1
- Runs batted in: 2
- Stats at Baseball Reference

Teams
- Boston Red Sox (1976–1977)

Jack Edward Baker (born May 4, 1950) is a former first baseman in Major League Baseball who played for the Boston Red Sox between 1976 and 1977. Baker batted and threw right-handed. Listed at 6' 5", 225 lb., he was selected by Boston in the 1971 draft out of Auburn University. He played professional baseball from 1971 to 1978 and was a power hitter, hitting 144 home runs in the minor leagues including one season in which he hit 36 home runs for the Pawtucket Red Sox.

His major league career was brief. In a 14-game career, Baker was a .115 hitter (3-for-26), including one home run, one run, and two RBI. His one home run was hit at Fenway Park in Boston when he was playing for the Boston Red Sox on September 23, 1976. Baker led off the last of the second by hitting a solo home run of the Milwaukee Brewers Bill Travers. The game was won by the Red Sox by a score of 10 to 3.

During the 1977 midseason, Baker was traded to the Cleveland Indians but he did not play for them.
