= Walt Slagle =

American baseball player (1878–1974)

- Pitcher
- Born: December 15, 1878; Kenton, Ohio, U.S.
- Died: June 14, 1974 (aged 95); San Gabriel, California, U.S.
- Batted: Both Threw: Right

MLB debut
- May 4, 1910, for the Cincinnati Reds

Last MLB appearance
- May 4, 1910, for the Cincinnati Reds

MLB statistics
- Games played: 1
- Innings pitched: 1
- Earned run average: 9.00
- Stats at Baseball Reference

Teams
- Cincinnati Reds (1910)

Walter Jennings Slagle (December 15, 1878 – June 14, 1974) was an American pitcher in Major League Baseball. He played for the Cincinnati Reds in 1910. His only major league game was attended by the President William Howard Taft, although Taft didn't stay for the entire game. Walt was 31 years old when he got to the big leagues, and pitched one inning. Although he gave up no hits, he did allow three walks and had one hit-batsman. His game was for the Cincinnati Reds against the St. Louis Cardinals, on May 4, 1910. He had a long minor league career as well stretching from 1897 to 1918. His career likely ended because he contracted the Spanish Flu in 1918 but he did survive. He is a distant cousin of former outfielder Jimmy Slagle. Slagle died on June 14, 1974. He was interred at Rose Hills Memorial Park.
