= Dike Varney =

American baseball player (1880-1950)

- Pitcher
- Born: August 9, 1880; Dover, New Hampshire, U.S.
- Died: April 23, 1950 (aged 69); Long Island City, New York, U.S.
- Batted: Left Threw: Left

MLB debut
- July 3, 1902, for the Cleveland Bronchos

Last MLB appearance
- July 29, 1902, for the Cleveland Bronchos

MLB statistics
- Win–loss record: 1-1
- Earned run average: 6.14
- Strikeouts: 7
- Stats at Baseball Reference

Teams
- Cleveland Bronchos (1902)

Lawrence Delano De Varney (August 9, 1880 – April 23, 1950) was an American Major League Baseball pitcher. He played professionally for the Cleveland Bronchos during part of the 1902 season.

== Early life and career ==
Varney, was born in Dover, New Hampshire and played college baseball at Dartmouth College. He started three games for the Cleveland Bronchos, all in July 1902. He gave up 31 baserunners, (14 hits, 12 walks, and 5 hit batsmen) and 10 earned runs in 14.2 total innings. His lone win came against the Detroit Tigers, and his only loss was to the Baltimore Orioles.

In Varney's short Major League career, he won one game, lost one game with seven strikeouts and an ERA of 6.14.

He died at the age of 69 in Long Island City, New York.
