= Jim Doyle (baseball) =

American baseball player (1886–1912)

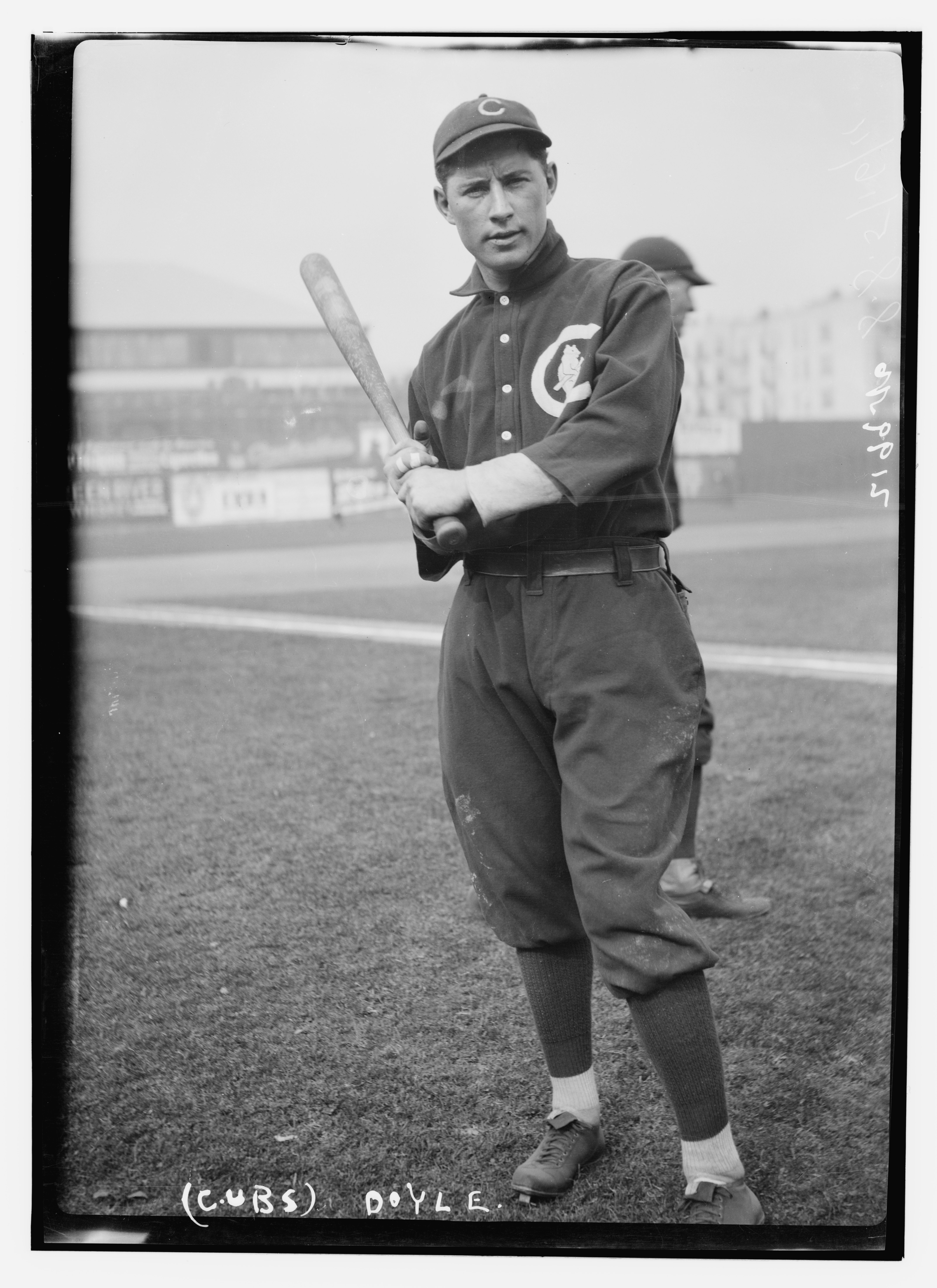
- Third baseman
- Born: December 21, 1886; Detroit, Michigan, U.S.
- Died: February 1, 1912 (aged 25); Syracuse, New York, U.S.
- Batted: Right Threw: Right

MLB debut
- May 4, 1910, for the Cincinnati Reds

Last MLB appearance
- October 12, 1911, for the Chicago Cubs

MLB statistics
- Batting average: .278
- Home runs: 5
- Runs batted in: 63
- Stats at Baseball Reference

Teams
- Cincinnati Reds (1910); Chicago Cubs (1911)

James Francis Doyle (December 21, 1886 – February 1, 1912) was an American professional baseball infielder. He played for two seasons in Major League Baseball for the Cincinnati Reds and Chicago Cubs. Doyle played in college at Niagara University. Doyle's appendix burst early in 1912, killing him.

== See also ==
- List of baseball players who died during their careers
