= Lou North =

American baseball player (1891–1974)

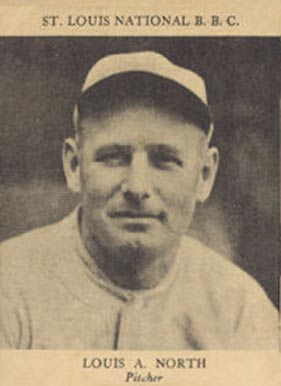
- Pitcher
- Born: June 15, 1891; Elgin, Illinois, U.S.
- Died: May 15, 1974 (aged 82); Shelton, Connecticut, U.S.
- Batted: Right Threw: Right

MLB debut
- August 22, 1913, for the Detroit Tigers

Last MLB appearance
- July 20, 1924, for the Boston Braves

MLB statistics
- Win–loss record: 21–16
- Earned run average: 4.43
- Strikeouts: 199
- Stats at Baseball Reference

Teams
- Detroit Tigers (1913); St. Louis Cardinals (1917, 1920–1924); Boston Braves (1924)

Louis Alexander North (June 15, 1891 – May 15, 1974) was an American professional baseball player. He was a right-handed pitcher over parts of seven seasons (1913, 1917, 1920–1924) with the Detroit Tigers, St. Louis Cardinals and Boston Braves. For his career, he compiled a 21–16 record in 172 appearances, most as a relief pitcher, with a 4.43 earned run average and 199 strikeouts.

In 1918 North served in the military during World War I.

== See also ==
- List of Major League Baseball annual saves leaders
