= Dave Pickett =

American baseball player (1874–1950)

- Outfielder
- Born: May 26, 1874; Brookline, Massachusetts, U.S.
- Died: April 22, 1950 (aged 75); Easton, Massachusetts, U.S.
- Batted: Unknown Threw: Right

MLB debut
- July 21, 1898, for the Boston Beaneaters

Last MLB appearance
- August 5, 1898, for the Boston Beaneaters

MLB statistics
- Batting average: .279
- Home runs: 0
- Runs batted in: 3
- Stats at Baseball Reference

Teams
- Boston Beaneaters (1898)

David Pickett (May 26, 1874 – April 22, 1950) was an American outfielder in Major League Baseball. He played for the Boston Beaneaters in 1898.
