= Rabbit Robinson =

American baseball player (1882–1915)

- Image from Chicago Daily News negatives collection, Chicago History Museum
- Infielder / Outfielder
- Born: March 5, 1882; Wellsburg, West Virginia, U.S.
- Died: April 9, 1915 (aged 33); Waterbury, Connecticut, U.S.
- Batted: Right Threw: Right

MLB debut
- April 22, 1903, for the Washington Senators

Last MLB appearance
- June 9, 1910, for the Cincinnati Reds

MLB statistics
- Batting average: .223
- Home runs: 1
- Runs batted in: 58
- Stats at Baseball Reference

Teams
- Washington Senators (1903); Detroit Tigers (1904); Cincinnati Reds (1910)

William Clyde "Rabbit" Robinson (March 5, 1882 – April 8, 1915) was an American professional baseball player for 16 years from 1900 to 1915. He played three seasons in the major leagues for the Washington Senators (1903), Detroit Tigers (1904), and Cincinnati Reds (1910).

Robinson was born in 1882 at Wellsburg, West Virginia. He began playing professional baseball in 1900 at age 18. He played for the Kansas City Blue Stockings of the Western League in 1901 and 1902 and compiled a .298 batting average in 1902.

In 1903, Robinson made his major league debut with the Washington Senators. He appeared in 103 games but his batting average fell to .212. While with the Senators, he appeared in 45 games at second base, 30 games in the outfield, 24 games at shortstop, and five games at third base.

In 1904, Robinson played for the Detroit Tigers, appearing in 101 games with a .241 batting average and .315 on-base percentage. With Detroit, he appeared in 30 games at shortstop, 26 games at third base, 20 games in the outfield, and 19 games at second base.

From 1905 to 1910, Robinson played for the Milwaukee Brewers of the American Association. He got another shot in the major leagues in 1910, appearing in two games for the Cincinnati Reds.

Robinson played in 206 major league games, 64 as a second baseman, 54 as a shortstop, 50 as an outfielder, and 33 as a third baseman. He compiled a .223 career batting average and a .294 on-base percentage, with 156 hits, 71 runs scored, 63 bases on balls, 30 stolen bases, and 38 extra base hits.

In June 1910, Cincinnati traded Robinson to the Louisville Colonels. Robinson continued playing in the minor leagues, including stints with the Louisville Colonels (1910–1911), Wilkes-Barre Barons (1911), Canton Senators (1913), and Waterbury Contenders (1914).

In March 1915, Robinson became ill at Waterbury, Connecticut, where he had played shortstop for the local baseball team in 1914. He died there in April 1915. Robinson was only 33 years old at the time of his death.
