= Mickey Corcoran =

American baseball player (1882–1950)

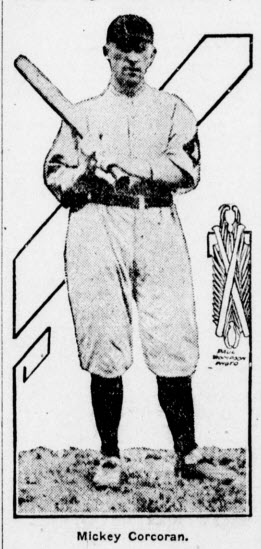
- Second baseman
- Born: August 26, 1882; Buffalo, New York, U.S.
- Died: December 9, 1950 (aged 68); Buffalo, New York, U.S.
- Batted: Right Threw: Right

MLB debut
- September 15, 1910, for the Cincinnati Reds

Last MLB appearance
- October 9, 1910, for the Cincinnati Reds

MLB statistics
- Batting average: .217
- Home runs: 0
- Runs batted in: 7
- Stats at Baseball Reference

Teams
- Cincinnati Reds (1910)

Michael Joseph Corcoran (August 26, 1882 – December 9, 1950) was an American Major League Baseball (MLB) second baseman. He played in 14 games for the 1910 Cincinnati Reds. He played in the minor leagues through 1924 and had brief stints as a manager in the minors in 1922 and 1924.

== Sources ==
- Career statistics from Baseball Reference · Baseball Reference (Minors) · Retrosheet · Baseball Almanac
