= Heinie Elder =

American baseball player (1890–1958)

- Pitcher
- Born: August 23, 1890; Seattle, Washington
- Died: November 13, 1958 (aged 68); Long Beach, California
- Batted: Left Threw: Left

MLB debut
- July 7, 1913, for the Detroit Tigers

Last MLB appearance
- July 7, 1913, for the Detroit Tigers

MLB statistics
- Games pitched: 1
- Earned run average: 8.10
- Innings pitched: 3.1
- Stats at Baseball Reference

Teams
- Detroit Tigers (1913)

Henry Knox "Heinie" Elder Sr. (August 23, 1890 – November 13, 1958) was a Major League Baseball pitcher. He was born in Seattle, Washington, and died in Long Beach, California.

== Playing career ==
After attending the University of Minnesota, and playing baseball for the Golden Gophers in his 1911 freshman season, Elder played one game in the major leagues, at age 22, as a left-handed relief pitcher for the Detroit Tigers on July 7, 1913. He pitched 3 1/3 innings and gave up four hits, five bases on balls, and three earned runs for an earned run average of 8.10.

== Military service and later years ==
Elder is one of the few major league players to have served in both World War I and World War II. He was a lieutenant colonel in the U.S. Army. He served in France during World War I and was active in the Army reserves for 23 years between the wars. He held administrative posts as a major and lieutenant colonel during World War II.

Elder graduated from the University of Minnesota Law School and became a lawyer. He practiced law in Los Angeles for 25 years. He moved to Balboa in 1955. He died in 1958 at age 68 at the Veterans Hospital in Long Beach, California. He was buried at the Los Angeles National Cemetery on Sepulveda Boulevard, north of Wilshire Boulevard, in Los Angeles.
