= Charlie Harding =

American baseball player (1891–1971)

- Pitcher
- Born: January 3, 1891; Nashville, Tennessee
- Died: October 30, 1971 (aged 80); Bold Spring, Tennessee
- Batted: Right Threw: Right

MLB debut
- September 18, 1913, for the Detroit Tigers

Last MLB appearance
- September 18, 1913, for the Detroit Tigers

MLB statistics
- Games pitched: 1
- Earned run average: 4.50
- Innings pitched: 2.0
- Stats at Baseball Reference

Teams
- Detroit Tigers (1913)

Charles Harold "Slim" Harding (January 3, 1891 – October 30, 1971) was a Major League Baseball pitcher who played in one game for the Detroit Tigers on September 18, 1913. He pitched in two innings, and allowed three hits and one run.
