= Ned Crompton =

English baseball player (1889–1950)

- Left fielder
- Born: February 13, 1889; Liverpool, England
- Died: September 28, 1950 (aged 61); Aspinwall, Pennsylvania, U.S.
- Batted: Right Threw: Right

MLB debut
- September 13, 1909, for the St. Louis Browns

Last MLB appearance
- October 8, 1910, for the Cincinnati Reds

MLB statistics
- Batting average: .154
- Home runs: 0
- Runs batted in: 2
- Stats at Baseball Reference

Teams
- St. Louis Browns (1909); Cincinnati Reds (1910)

Edward Crompton (February 13, 1889 – September 28, 1950) was an English born Major League Baseball outfielder. He played parts of two seasons in the majors, playing 17 games as a left fielder for the St. Louis Browns in 1909 and one game as a center fielder for the Cincinnati Reds in 1910.
