= Wingo Anderson =

American baseball player (1886–1950)

- Pitcher
- Born: August 13, 1886; Lillian, Texas, U.S.
- Died: December 19, 1950 (aged 64); Fort Worth, Texas, U.S.
- Batted: Left Threw: Left

MLB debut
- April 16, 1910, for the Cincinnati Reds

Last MLB appearance
- June 1, 1910, for the Cincinnati Reds

MLB statistics
- Win–loss record: 0–0
- Earned run average: 4.67
- Strikeouts: 11
- Stats at Baseball Reference

Teams
- Cincinnati Reds (1910)

Wingo Charlie Anderson (August 13, 1886 – December 19, 1950) was an American Major League Baseball player. A left-handed pitcher, Anderson had a listed weight of 150 pounds.

Although Anderson pitched professionally for several seasons in the minor leagues, appearing for teams such as the Longview Cannibals and the Tyler Elbertas, he spent only one season in the major leagues. As a member of the Cincinnati Reds in 1910, he started two games and appeared in five more as a reliever, compiling a 4.67 ERA in 17⅓ innings pitched. He also collected one hit in five at-bats.
