= Bob Meinke =

American baseball player (1887–1952)

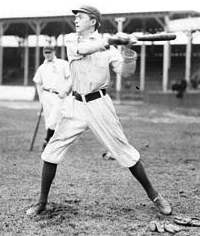
- Meinke in 1909.
- Shortstop
- Born: June 25, 1887; Chicago, Illinois
- Died: December 29, 1952 (aged 65); Chicago, Illinois
- Batted: Right Threw: Right

MLB debut
- August 22, 1910, for the Cincinnati Reds

Last MLB appearance
- September 3, 1910, for the Cincinnati Reds
- Stats at Baseball Reference

Teams
- Cincinnati Reds (1910)

Robert Bernard Meinke (June 25, 1887 – December 29, 1952) was an American baseball shortstop who appeared in 2 games for the Cincinnati Reds in 1910. He batted and threw right-handed.

His father, Frank Meinke, played for the Detroit Wolverines of the National League from 1884–1885.

== See also ==
- List of second-generation Major League Baseball players
