= 1958 in baseball =

The following are the baseball events of the year 1958 throughout the world.

== Champions ==
=== Major League Baseball ===
- World Series: New York Yankees over Milwaukee Braves (4–3); Bob Turley, MVP
- All-Star Game, July 8 at Memorial Stadium: American League, 4–3

=== Other champions ===
- College World Series: USC
- 1958 Japan Series: Nishitetsu Lions over Yomiuri Giants (4–3)
- Little League World Series: Industrial, Monterrey, Mexico

Winter Leagues

- 1958 Caribbean Series: Tigres de Marianao
- Cuban League: Tigres de Marianao
- Dominican Republic League: Leones del Escogido
- Mexican Pacific League: Venados de Mazatlán
- Panamanian League: Carta Vieja Yankees
- Puerto Rican League: Criollos de Caguas
- Venezuelan League: Industriales de Valencia

== Awards and honors ==
Baseball Writers' Association of America Awards
BBWAA Award	National League	American League
Rookie of the Year	Orlando Cepeda (SF)	Albie Pearson (WSH)
Cy Young Award	—	Bob Turley (NYY)
Most Valuable Player	Ernie Banks (CHC)	Jackie Jensen (BOS)
Gold Glove Awards
Position	National League	American League
Pitcher	Harvey Haddix (CIN)	Bobby Shantz (NYY)
Catcher	Del Crandall (MIL)	Sherm Lollar (CWS)
1st Base	Gil Hodges (LAD)	Vic Power (CLE/KCA)
2nd Base	Bill Mazeroski (PIT)	Frank Bolling (DET)
3rd Base	Ken Boyer (STL)	Frank Malzone (BOS)
Shortstop	Roy McMillan (CIN)	Luis Aparicio (CWS)
Left field	Frank Robinson (CIN)	Norm Siebern (NY)
Center field	Willie Mays (SF)	Jimmy Piersall (BOS)
Right field	Hank Aaron (MIL)	Al Kaline (DET)

== Statistical leaders ==
	American League		National League	
Stat	Player	Total	Player	Total
AVG	Ted Williams (BOS)	.328	Richie Ashburn (PHI)	.350
HR	Mickey Mantle (NYY)	42	Ernie Banks (CHC)	47
RBI	Jackie Jensen (BOS)	122	Ernie Banks (CHC)	129
W	Bob Turley (NYY)	21	Bob Friend (PIT); Warren Spahn (MIL)	22
ERA	Whitey Ford (NYY)	2.01	Stu Miller (SF)	2.47
K	Early Wynn (CWS)	179	Sam Jones (STL)	225

== Major league baseball final standings ==
=== American League final standings ===
American League
Team	W	L	Pct.	GB	Home	Road
New York Yankees	92	62	.597	—	44‍–‍33	48‍–‍29
Chicago White Sox	82	72	.532	10	47‍–‍30	35‍–‍42
Boston Red Sox	79	75	.513	13	49‍–‍28	30‍–‍47
Cleveland Indians	77	76	.503	14½	42‍–‍34	35‍–‍42
Detroit Tigers	77	77	.500	15	43‍–‍34	34‍–‍43
Baltimore Orioles	74	79	.484	17½	46‍–‍31	28‍–‍48
Kansas City Athletics	73	81	.474	19	43‍–‍34	30‍–‍47
Washington Senators	61	93	.396	31	33‍–‍44	28‍–‍49

Locations of teams for the 1955–1960 American League seasons
American League

=== National League final standings ===
National League
Team	W	L	Pct.	GB	Home	Road
Milwaukee Braves	92	62	.597	—	48‍–‍29	44‍–‍33
Pittsburgh Pirates	84	70	.545	8	49‍–‍28	35‍–‍42
San Francisco Giants	80	74	.519	12	44‍–‍33	36‍–‍41
Cincinnati Redlegs	76	78	.494	16	40‍–‍37	36‍–‍41
Chicago Cubs	72	82	.468	20	35‍–‍42	37‍–‍40
St. Louis Cardinals	72	82	.468	20	39‍–‍38	33‍–‍44
Los Angeles Dodgers	71	83	.461	21	39‍–‍38	32‍–‍45
Philadelphia Phillies	69	85	.448	23	35‍–‍42	34‍–‍43

Locations of teams for the 1958 National League season
National League

== Nippon Professional Baseball final standings ==
=== Central League final standings ===
Central League	G	W	L	T	Pct.	GB
Yomiuri Giants	130	77	52	1	.596	—
Osaka Tigers	130	72	58	0	.554	5.5
Chunichi Dragons	130	66	59	5	.527	9.0
Kokutetsu Swallows	130	58	68	4	.462	17.5
Hiroshima Carp	130	54	68	8	.446	19.5
Taiyo Whales	130	51	73	6	.415	23.5

=== Pacific League final standings ===
Pacific League	G	W	L	T	Pct.	GB
Nishitetsu Lions	130	78	47	5	.619	—
Nankai Hawks	130	77	48	5	.612	1.0
Hankyu Braves	130	73	51	6	.585	4.5
Daimai Orions	130	62	63	5	.496	16.0
Toei Flyers	130	57	70	3	.450	22.0
Kintetsu Pearls	130	29	97	4	.238	49.5

== Events ==
=== January ===
- January 6 – With the National League season set to begin in a little more than 90 days, Walter O'Malley, owner of the newly transplanted Los Angeles Dodgers, meets for the third time with Pasadena officials about using the Rose Bowl as the Dodgers' temporary home stadium. NL president Warren Giles supports O'Malley at the confab. The club will ultimately play at the LA Coliseum for four seasons while Dodger Stadium is under construction in Elysian Park.
- January 21 – For one season, the Philadelphia Phillies will enjoy an exclusive National League television deal in New York City. With NL fans in Gotham reeling over the loss of their teams—the Brooklyn Dodgers and New York Giants—they will be able to see 78 Senior Circuit contests, including those the Phillies play against the Dodgers and Giants, on WOR–TV. Veteran announcer Al Helfer will handle play-by-play.
- January 23 – The Boston Red Sox acquire infielder and future two-time American League batting champion (1960, 1962) Pete Runnels from the Washington Senators for first baseman Norm Zauchin and outfield prospect Albie Pearson.
- January 24 – Mary Louise Smith, widow of late pharmaceutical executive and Dodgers' co-owner John L. Smith, sells her 25 percent share in the club to Walter O'Malley, who now holds 75 percent of the team's stock.
- January 28
  - Dodger catcher Roy Campanella suffers a broken neck in an early morning auto accident on Long Island. His spinal column is nearly severed and his legs are permanently paralyzed. Only 36 years old, the Brooklyn immortal will never play for the Dodgers in Los Angeles; he will be elected to the Baseball Hall of Fame in 1969, his #39 uniform will be retired, and he will work for the Dodgers as a goodwill ambassador from 1977 until his death in 1993.
  - The Detroit Tigers acquire third baseman Ozzie Virgil Sr. and first baseman Gail Harris from the San Francisco Giants for third baseman Jim Finigan and $25,000. Virgil, who in 1956 became the first native of the Dominican Republic to play in the majors, will break the Tigers' color line on June 6.
- January 29 – The Cleveland Indians claim first baseman Mickey Vernon off waivers from the Boston Red Sox.

=== February ===
- February 4 – The Baseball Hall of Fame fails to elect any new members for the first time since 1950.
- February 6 – Ted Williams signs a one-year contract with the Boston Red Sox. Reports on the worth of the contract estimate from $135,000 to $150,000. Either way, Williams becomes the highest paid player in major league history.
- February 13 – By defeating Puerto Rico (3–3) today by a score of 2–0, Cuba captures its third consecutive Caribbean Series, four games to two. For the second straight year, Cuba's championship is delivered by its Marianao club. Earl Battey of the Chicago White Sox, playing for Venezuela, is series MVP. Cuba's winning runs cross the plate in the top of the ninth inning; future ChiSox hurler Bob Shaw wins the clincher.
- February 18 – The Detroit Tigers trade left-hander Hal Woodeshick and catcher Jay Porter to the Cleveland Indians for southpaw Hank Aguirre and longtime Cleveland catcher Jim Hegan.

=== March ===
- March 5 – Six-foot, seven-inch (2.01 m) Ohio State University outfielder Frank Howard enters professional baseball by signing a free agent contract with the Los Angeles Dodgers.
- March 21 – Don Mueller, regular right-fielder for the New York Giants for the past eight seasons, won't keep that job in San Francisco after the Giants send the 30-year-old to the Chicago White Sox for cash considerations. Rookie Willie Kirkland will start in Mueller's old post on Opening Day 1958.
- March 30 – The Chicago Cubs sell the contract of left-hander Dick Littlefield to the Milwaukee Braves. The deal cements Littlefield's status as one of the most well-traveled players of the reserve clause era that restricted player movement: counting his brief time on the Brooklyn Dodgers' 1956–1957 winter roster (via a trade nullified by Jackie Robinson's retirement), the Braves are Littlefield's tenth MLB team, representing 63 percent of the 16 franchises in existence in 1958.

=== April ===
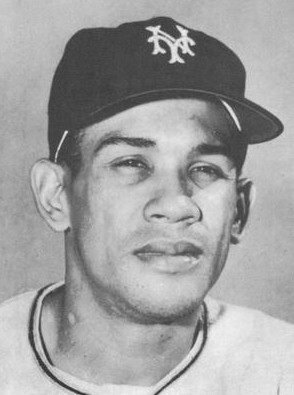
The Giants' Rubén Gómez, who threw the first pitch in MLB's West Coast debut (1955 photo)

- April 1 – After acquiring him in the offseason, the Baltimore Orioles trade future Hall-of-Fame outfielder Larry Doby and pitcher Don Ferrarese to the Cleveland Indians in exchange for pitcher Bud Daley and outfielders Gene Woodling and Dick Williams. Doby has spent 1956 and 1957 with the Chicago White Sox; this trade reunites him with the city and team where he broke the color line in the American League in July 1947, won a World Series, and spent the first nine seasons of his AL career.
- April 3 – New York Giants legend Bobby Thomson is traded to the Chicago Cubs for outfielder Bob Speake and cash in a spring training transaction. Thomson, 34 and the hero of the Giants' 1951 season, is traded before he can play an official game in a San Francisco uniform.
- April 15 – In the first Major League Baseball game played on the West Coast, Rubén Gómez of the homestanding San Francisco Giants hurls an 8–0 shutout against the visiting Los Angeles Dodgers. Giants' shortstop Daryl Spencer hits the first MLB home run on the Pacific Coast. A park-record 23,192 fans pack Seals Stadium, a minor league facility that will house the Giants in 1958–1959, to witness the historic game.
- April 17
  - Eddie Mathews hits two home runs and knocks in five runs, to lead the Milwaukee Braves to a 6–1 victory over the Pittsburgh Pirates at Milwaukee County Stadium. Mathews had also hit a pair of homers against the Pirates to start the season, as he becomes the first major league player to begin a season with consecutive two-homer games. The mark will be matched by Barry Bonds, who also hit a pair of homers in each of the San Francisco Giants first two games against the Los Angeles Dodgers to start the 2002 season.
  - The Cleveland Indians and Kansas City Athletics trade pitchers, with Cleveland dealing left-hander Bud Daley to Kansas City for righty Arnie Portocarrero.
- April 18 – Before 78,672 fans at the Los Angeles Memorial Coliseum, a National League record for a regular-season game, the Dodgers play host to the Giants in Los Angeles' first-ever big-league contest. Veteran hurler Carl Erskine goes eight innings and rookie third baseman Dick Gray hits the Dodgers' first home run in the Coliseum's makeshift, misshapen baseball configuration, as Los Angeles wins, 6–5.
- April 25 – The Dodgers draw 60,635, a major-league record for a regular-season night game, to their 5–3 win over the St. Louis Cardinals at the LA Coliseum.

=== May ===
- May 9 – Ted Kluszewski's home run in the bottom of the 12th off Robin Roberts breaks up a scoreless duel and enables the Pittsburgh Pirates to defeat the Philadelphia Phillies, 1–0. Ron Kline hurls the 12-inning shutout for Pittsburgh.
- May 11 – St. Louis Cardinals manager Fred Hutchinson sets a National League record by using ten pinch hitters during a doubleheader. Despite walking 14 batters in game one, St. Louis manages to top the Chicago Cubs, 8–7, and follow in game two with a 6–5 win. The Cardinals will tie their own record against the Pirates on July 13.
- May 12 – Willie Mays hits the first grand slam in San Francisco Giants history. Mays also belts another home run in a 12–3 victory over the rival Los Angeles Dodgers.
- May 13
  - San Francisco Giants teammates Willie Mays and Daryl Spencer each have four extra-base hits as San Francisco drubs the Dodgers in Los Angeles, 16–9. Mays hits two home runs, two triples, a single and drives in four runs; Spencer has two home runs, a triple, a double and six RBI for a combined 28 total bases. The Giants amass 26 hits, most by any MLB team in a game this season.
    - For this four-game, home-and-home Giants–Dodgers series, Mays goes 12 for 17 (.706), including seven homers, with a OPS of 2.997.
  - Stan Musial of the St. Louis Cardinals collects his 3,000th career hit with his pinch-hit double off Chicago Cubs pitcher Moe Drabowsky at Wrigley Field. The Cardinals win, 5–3.
- May 14 – The Kansas City Athletics purchase the contract of outfielder Whitey Herzog, 26, from the Washington Senators.
- May 20 – The St. Louis Cardinals trade veteran shortstop Alvin Dark to the Chicago Cubs for right-hander Jim Brosnan. Dark, 36, is a three-time former NL All-Star.
- May 23 – Willie Mays hits his 200th career home run, a two-run shot off Warren Spahn in the ninth inning of a game against the Milwaukee Braves at Milwaukee County Stadium. The home run drives in the decisive runs of the game, as the San Francisco Giants down the Braves, 5–3.
- May 31 – Milwaukee sluggers Hank Aaron, Eddie Mathews and Wes Covington hit one home run apiece on three consecutive pitches against Pittsburgh Pirates starter Ron Kline as the Braves win, 8–3.

=== June ===
- June 3
  - Voters in Los Angeles approve "Proposition B" by 25,785 votes (out of 670,000 ballots cast), which enables the Dodgers' acquisition of land in Chavez Ravine to move forward. Privately built and owned Dodger Stadium will be constructed on that site and open in 1962.
  - The San Francisco Giants sign 19-year-old amateur free agent pitcher Gaylord Perry to a $60,000 bonus contract after his standout high-school career in Williamston, North Carolina.
- June 6 – Third baseman Ozzie Virgil breaks the Detroit Tigers' color line in an 11–2 triumph over the Washington Senators at Griffith Stadium. Virgil collects a double and scores a run in five at bats. Detroit is the 15th of the 16 MLB clubs to integrate its roster; only the Boston Red Sox remain all-white.
- June 10
  - The disappointing, 21–28 Tigers, 12½ games out of the lead and in last place in the American League, replace manager Jack Tighe with Triple-A skipper Bill Norman. They will go 56–49 under Norman for the rest of the way and finish fifth in the AL.
  - Warren Spahn, en route to the Baseball Hall of Fame as the winningest left-hander in MLB annals, notches a dubious achievement: he surrenders five home runs in a seven-inning outing. But he gains the victory when his Milwaukee Braves down the Chicago Cubs, 9–6, at Wrigley Field. The five gopher-balls are the most allowed by any big-league pitcher in 1958.
- June 12 – In a shortstop-for-shortstop transaction, the Cleveland Indians trade Alfonso "Chico" Carrasquel to the Kansas City Athletics for Billy Hunter.
- June 15
  - Carresquel goes 5-for-6 with four runs batted in and scores two times, as his Kansas City Athletics thrash the Boston Red Sox, 17–6, at Fenway Park. Héctor López collects four RBI, while Bob Cerv and Frank House add two runs and three RBI a piece. Ralph Terry is the winning pitcher and Jack Urban ears the save, while Willard Nixon absorbs the loss. It's the fifth five-hit game of Carresquel's career.
  - The Cleveland Indians trade outfielder Roger Maris, pitcher Dick Tomanek and infielder/outfielder Preston Ward to the Kansas City Athletics for infielders Woodie Held and Vic Power.
  - The Athletics also acquire pitcher Bob Grim and outfielder Harry Simpson from the New York Yankees for pitchers Virgil Trucks and Duke Maas.
  - The Los Angeles Dodgers trade former ace starting pitcher Don Newcombe, 32, to the Cincinnati Redlegs for four players: hurlers Johnny Klippstein, Art Fowler ("player to be named later/PTBNL") and Charlie Rabe (PTBNL), and first baseman Steve Bilko.
  - The Chicago White Sox acquire pitcher Bob Shaw and first baseman Ray Boone from the Detroit Tigers for pitcher Bill Fischer and outfielder/first baseman Tito Francona.
  - The St. Louis Cardinals deal shortstop and former bonus baby Ducky Schofield and cash to the Pittsburgh Pirates for third baseman Gene Freese and infielder/pitcher Johnny O'Brien.
- June 23 – The Chicago White Sox claim relief pitcher Turk Lown on waivers from the Cincinnati Redlegs.
- June 26 – After only 67 games as their manager, Bobby Bragan is replaced by Joe Gordon at the helm of the Cleveland Indians. Gordon, their former standout second baseman, will post a 46–40 mark as Cleveland finishes fourth in the American League.
- June 27 – Against the Washington Senators at Comiskey Park, Billy Pierce of the Chicago White Sox has a perfect game broken up with two out in the ninth—by inches. Pinch-hitter Ed Fitz Gerald strokes Pierce's first pitch down the right field line, the ball landing just inside the foul line for a double, the only hit Pierce allows in a 3–0 White Sox victory. The perfect game would have been the first in regular season play since that of another White Sox, Charlie Robertson, in 1922. Today's complete game shutout is Pierce's third in a row; he's in the midst of a 341/3 consecutive innings scoreless streak—longest by any MLB pitcher in 1958.
- June 30 – The Detroit Tigers sign amateur free agent pitcher Mickey Lolich. The left-hander, 17, recently graduated from a Portland, Oregon, high school.

=== July ===
- July 2 – One day after he appears in a game as a pinch hitter, the Cleveland Indians release pitcher Bob Lemon, ending Lemon's Hall-of-Fame major league career, spent entirely with Cleveland.
- July 4 – After the holiday games are in the books, marking the season's unofficial half-way point, only seven games separate the eight National League clubs, with the defending World Series champion Milwaukee Braves (39–32) holding first place by 1½ games over the St. Louis Cardinals (37–33) with the San Francisco Giants (39–36) two games back. The New York Yankees, meanwhile, are 48–24 and threatening to run away with the American League pennant, sporting a 10½-game advantage over the surprising second-place Kansas City Athletics (38–35).
- July 8 – At Memorial Stadium, home of the Baltimore Orioles, the American League defeats the National League, 4–3, in the 1958 Major League Baseball All-Star Game in the first Midsummer Classic without an extra-base hit.
- July 19 – The Milwaukee Braves sign amateur free-agent pitcher Phil Niekro, 19, already a knuckleballer, who has been playing semi-pro baseball in his native Ohio.
- July 20 – In the first game of a doubleheader at Fenway Park, Jim Bunning of the Detroit Tigers no-hits the Boston Red Sox 3–0.
- July 22 – Eddie Sawyer, manager of the 1950 "Whiz Kids", returns to the Philadelphia Phillies' helm after a six-year absence, replacing Mayo Smith. The move fizzles, however, as the Phils (39–44) drop from a fifth-place tie to eighth and last in the National League over the season's final 68 games.
- July 27 – The second games of doubleheaders played in Pennsylvania are both suspended by Sunday evening curfews. At Connie Mack Stadium, umpires halt the contest between the Philadelphia Phillies and Los Angeles Dodgers with two outs in the home half of the sixth and the Phillies leading, 2–1. At Forbes Field, the Pittsburgh Pirates and San Francisco Giants are knotted 3–3 when the curfew bell tolls with one out in the eighth—one batter after Giants manager Bill Rigney is ejected for stalling tactics. On September 9, both games will be resumed in progress: the Dodgers push the Phillies to ten innings but Wally Post's grand slam home run settles matters definitively for the home side, 6–2; meanwhile, the Pirates' Roberto Clemente, who had drawn a base on balls on July 27, scores the winning run on Frank Thomas' RBI single, delivering a 4–3 Pittsburgh victory.
- July 28 – For the sixth time in his career, Mickey Mantle hits home runs from both sides of the plate. New York beats the Kansas City Athletics, 14–7.

=== August ===
- August 7 – The Pittsburgh Pirates sign amateur free-agent outfielder Willie Stargell, 18, a recent graduate of Encinal High School of Alameda, California.
- August 14
  - Birdie Tebbetts, manager of Cincinnati Redlegs since Opening Day 1954, announces his resignation and veteran coach Jimmy Dykes takes over as interim skipper. Cincinnati is 52–61 and last—but only 3½ games out of the first division—in the closely bunched National League standings.
  - Vic Power of the Cleveland Indians steals home twice during a ten-inning, 10–9 win over the Detroit Tigers. Power's second steal of home is the game-winner—and he swipes only one other base all season long. Accomplished numerous times during the deadball era, no player other than Power has twice stolen home in a game since the 1927 season.
- August 20 – Dale Long of the Chicago Cubs becomes MLB's first left-handed-throwing catcher in 56 years when he moves from his normal first-base position to behind the plate in the ninth inning of the Cubs' 4–2 defeat at the hands of the Pittsburgh Pirates. He wears his first-baseman's mitt to handle the offerings of pitcher Bill Henry, a fellow southpaw. Long will repeat this feat 32 days later, on September 21, when he catches one inning against the Los Angeles Dodgers at Wrigley Field and allows one passed ball that does not factor in the scoring in a 2–1 Dodger victory. He also records one assist as a catcher.
- August 22 – Ralph Terry of the Kansas City Athletics allows only one hit and one baserunner in a 1–0 victory over the Washington Senators' Russ Kemmerer at Griffith Stadium. Kemmerer himself spoils the perfect game suspense early with his third-inning single.
- August 23 – At Yankee Stadium, Nellie Fox of the Chicago White Sox strikes out against Whitey Ford in the first inning of the White Sox' 7–1 victory over the New York Yankees. The strikeout ends Fox's streak of 98 consecutive games without striking out; he had last struck out on May 16 against Dick Tomanek of the Cleveland Indians.

=== September ===
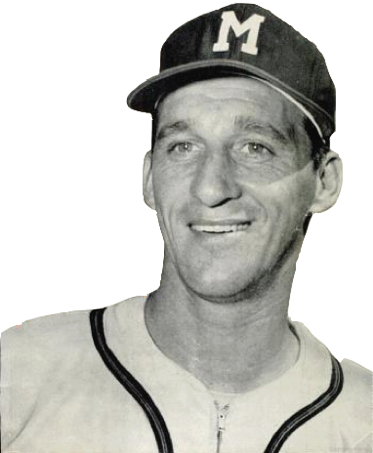
Warren Spahn in 1958

- September 9 – Sandy Koufax of the Los Angeles Dodgers unleashes four wild pitches in only 51/3 innings pitched before he departs for a reliever in the Dodgers' 4–3 loss to the Philadelphia Phillies at Connie Mack Stadium. The 22-year-old Koufax—still trying to master the command of his repertoire—will lead the National League with 17 wild pitches this season; his four today are the most by any MLB hurler in a 1958 game.
- September 13 – Milwaukee Braves ace Warren Spahn becomes the first left-handed pitcher to win twenty or more games nine times, after beating the St. Louis Cardinals 8–2. Previously, Eddie Plank and Lefty Grove each won twenty or more games, eight times.
- September 14 – The New York Yankees sweep a doubleheader against the Kansas City Athletics, 5–3 and 12–7 (14 innings), clinching their fourth straight American League pennant.
- September 15 – St. Louis Cardinals owner August A. Busch Jr. fires the reigning Major League Manager of the Year, Fred Hutchinson, with the Redbirds a disappointing 69–75 and sitting in fifth place. Coach Stan Hack is named interim pilot, but Busch has earmarked the team's 1959 managerial job for Solly Hemus, a fiery infielder and ex-Cardinal who's still an active player for the Philadelphia Phillies.
- September 20 – At Memorial Stadium, Hoyt Wilhelm of the Baltimore Orioles no-hits the New York Yankees 1–0, striking out eight along the way. It is the first no-hitter since the franchise's move to Baltimore. Wilhelm had pitched exclusively in relief prior to this season; this was only his ninth career start.
- September 21 – The Milwaukee Braves clinch their second consecutive National League pennant with a 6–5 victory over the Cincinnati Redlegs, thus ensuring a Yankees vs. Braves World Series for the second straight year.
- September 28 – In the season finale, Ted Williams continues his late-September hot streak, homering and doubling in four at-bats and raising his batting average to .328—best in the American League. He had been hitting only .314 on September 21 before going on a 12-for-19 (.632) tear. In winning the sixth and final batting title of his career, the 40-year-old Williams nips Boston Red Sox teammate Pete Runnels, who finishes second with a .322 mark.
- September 29
  - Solly Hemus, expected since September 15 to become the 1959 manager of the St. Louis Cardinals even though he's an active player for the rival Philadelphia Phillies, officially returns to the Redbirds as player–manager in a trade for third baseman Gene Freese.
  - Despite leading the Cincinnati Redlegs to a 24–17 mark through the end of the season, interim manager Jimmy Dykes, 61, is passed over for the permanent post when the Redlegs hire Mayo Smith, 43, as their 1959 manager. Smith had been fired as the Phillies' skipper July 22. Cincinnati club owner Powel Crosley Jr. says Dykes' age is a factor in Smith's hiring.

=== October ===
- October 3 – The Cincinnati Redlegs and St. Louis Cardinals pull off a six-player trade in which Cincinnati sends pitcher Alex Kellner, first baseman George Crowe and shortstop Alex Grammas to St. Louis for pitcher Bob Mabe, infielder Eddie Kasko and outfielder Del Ennis.
- October 7 – The St. Louis Cardinals keep dealing, acquiring pitchers Ernie Broglio and Marv Grissom from the San Francisco Giants for pitcher Billy Muffett, catcher Hobie Landrith and third baseman Benny Valenzuela. Broglio will put up 21- and 18-victory seasons during his 5½ years in St. Louis before becoming a key part of a famous trade in June 1964.
- October 9 – The New York Yankees defeat the Milwaukee Braves, 6–2, in the decisive Game 7 of the World Series to win their 18th world title. First baseman Moose Skowron's three-run home run off Milwaukee pitcher Lew Burdette in the eighth inning puts the game on ice. The Yankees become only the second team to come back from a 3–1 deficit to win a World Series (the 1925 Pittsburgh Pirates were the first). Milwaukee's Eddie Mathews strikes out for the 11th time, a record that will stand until 1980, when broken by Willie Wilson of the Kansas City Royals. The Braves' 53 strikeouts are also a new Series record. This is the seventh Fall Classic title for manager Casey Stengel, tying him with Joe McCarthy for most championships. Yankee hurler Bob Turley is named the MVP.
- October 28 – Construction for a new stadium for the San Francisco Giants begins at Candlestick Point. In honor of the location, the playing field will be called Candlestick Park,

=== November ===
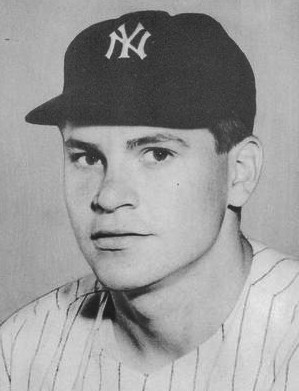
World Series MVP and Cy Young Award winner Bob Turley

- November 5 – Lee MacPhail, 41, is named general manager of the Baltimore Orioles after 14 years in the New York Yankees' organization, most recently as director of player personnel. His appointment restricts Paul Richards, who formerly held the dual role of GM and field manager, to the latter job. MacPhail will oversee the Orioles' rise to pennant contender and he departs the team in November 1965 when the franchise is poised to win its first World Series.
- November 12 – New York Yankees pitcher Bob Turley, who posted a 21–7 record with 168 strikeouts and a 2.97 earned run average, wins the Cy Young Award. With only one award given for the two leagues, Turley gathers five votes to four for the previous winner, Warren Spahn of the Milwaukee Braves, who went 22–11 with 150 strikeouts and a 3.07 ERA.
- November 14 – Hall-of-Fame slugger Mel Ott, whose 511 career home runs remain the all-time National League record, is critically injured in an automobile accident in Bay St. Louis, Mississippi. The longtime New York Giants star, whose #4 uniform was retired in 1949, dies seven days later at the age of 49. (See Deaths below for November 21.)
- November 20 – The Detroit Tigers trade pitcher Al Cicotte and second baseman Billy Martin to the Cleveland Indians for hurlers Don Mossi and Ray Narleski and infielder Ossie Álvarez.
- November 25 – Chicago Cubs slugger Ernie Banks, who batted .313 with 47 home runs and 129 RBI, is named National League Most Valuable Player. Willie Mays of the San Francisco Giants is the runner-up, after going .347, 29, 96.
- November 26 – Boston Red Sox outfielder Jackie Jensen, who hit .286 with 31 home runs and 122 RBI, is named American League MVP, winning over Cy Young Award recipient and World Series MVP Bob Turley and Cleveland Indians outfielder Rocky Colavito (.303, 41, 113).
- November 28
  - The American League announces that its 1959 Opening Day will be April 9, making it the earliest date ever to open the Junior Circuit's regular season.
  - The Boston Red Sox sign free-agent infielder Carl Yastrzemski to a reported bonus of $100,000. A sensation during his high school career in Bridgehampton, Long Island, Yastrzemski is a sophomore at Notre Dame.
- November 30 – Italian baseball commissioner Prince Borghese visits the United States to seek aid in organizing Italian teams.

=== December ===
- December 2
  - International League president Frank Shaughnessy reports that club owners are sympathetic to player demands for a pension plan, but says there is no way that $250,000 can be raised to start one.
  - National League president Warren Giles says he doubts New York City will get a franchise for several years. He says the NL will reject expansion now, even if assured of a stadium and financial backing.
  - The Cleveland Indians acquire two-time All-Star and 2x Gold Glove Award-winning centerfielder Jimmy Piersall from the Boston Red Sox for first baseman Vic Wertz and outfielder Gary Geiger. In a separate trade, Cleveland deals second baseman Bobby Ávila to the Baltimore Orioles for pitcher Russ Heman and cash.
- December 3
  - The San Francisco Giants obtain 1957's National League Rookie of the Year, pitcher Jack Sanford, from the Philadelphia Phillies for pitcher Rubén Gómez and catcher Valmy Thomas. In 1962, Sanford's 24 victories will power the Giants to the NL pennant.
  - The Phillies acquire 22-year-old shortstop Rubén Amaro from the St. Louis Cardinals for outfielder Chuck Essegian.
- December 4
  - The Los Angeles Dodgers trade outfielder Gino Cimoli to the Cardinals for pitcher Phil Paine and outfielder Wally Moon. The left-handed-hitting Moon becomes a hero in Southern California for his opposite-field homers—called "Moon shots"—at the misshapen Los Angeles Memorial Coliseum, and a central part of the Dodgers' 1959 world championship team.
  - Western Michigan University right-hander Jim Bouton begins his professional baseball career, signing as an amateur free agent with the New York Yankees.
  - The Triple-A American Association expands to ten teams by admitting the Houston Buffaloes, Dallas Rangers and Fort Worth Cats from the Double-A Texas League. This effectively denudes the Texas League, leaving it with five teams. It adds Amarillo from the expiring Western League to enable it to operate as a six-team loop in 1959.
- December 6 – The Detroit Tigers and Washington Senators swing a six-player deal in which Detroit acquires third baseman Eddie Yost, shortstop Rocky Bridges and outfielder Neil Chrisley in exchange for infielders Reno Bertoia and Ron Samford and outfielder Jim Delsing.
- December 15 – The Baltimore Orioles trade outfielder Jim Busby to the Boston Red Sox for infielder Billy Klaus.
- December 23 – The Philadelphia Phillies trade three players—pitchers Jim Golden and Gene Snyder and outfielder Rip Repulski—to the Los Angeles Dodgers for minor-league second baseman George "Sparky" Anderson. While Anderson stumbles in his only active MLB season in 1959, batting .218 in 152 games with only 12 extra-base hits, he will return to the majors a decade from now and, in 1970, begin a 26-year career as a Baseball Hall of Fame manager.
- December 30 – The Dodgers release team captain, future Hall-of-Fame shortstop and 16-year club veteran Pee Wee Reese. He will remain with the Dodgers as their third-base coach in 1959 (winning a World Series ring) before beginning a long career in television as a color man and analyst covering MLB games.

== Movies ==
- Damn Yankees
- The Sandlot

== Births ==
=== January ===
- January 3 – Brian Allard
- January 5 – Ron Kittle
- January 7 – Carlos Diaz
- January 9 – Bill Bordley
- January 10 – Pat Keedy
- January 12 – Rod Craig
- January 13 – Gene Roof
- January 19 – Rick Adair
- January 20 – Bill Scherrer
- January 24
  - Neil Allen
  - Atlee Hammaker
- January 26 – Mike Patterson
- January 31 – Rafael Santana

=== February ===
- February 2 – Pat Tabler
- February 6 – Bill Dawley
- February 7 – Ralph Citarella
- February 9 – Pete O'Brien
- February 12
  - Jim Beswick
  - Ken Smith
- February 13 – Frank Williams
- February 17
  - Mike Hart
  - Alan Wiggins
- February 18 – Rafael Ramírez
- February 20 – Brian Snyder
- February 21 – Alan Trammell
- February 23
  - Juan Agosto
  - John Shelby
- February 26
  - Bob Hegman
  - Darrell Miller
- February 28 – Dallas Williams

=== March ===
- March 2 – Jeff Stember
- March 4 – Lorenzo Gray
- March 7 – Albert Hall
- March 8 – Nick Capra
- March 9 – Brian Butterfield
- March 10 – Steve Howe
- March 11 – Larry Ray
- March 24 – Bruce Hurst
- March 26 – Chris Codiroli
- March 29 – Domingo Ramos

=== April ===
- April 1 – Mike Kinnunen
- April 2 – Mike Howard
- April 3 – Gary Pettis
- April 6 – Leo Sutherland
- April 11 – Jeff Calhoun
- April 16 – Rick Grapenthin
- April 19 – Ed Hodge
- April 22 – Stefan Wever
- April 24
  - Bill Krueger
  - Herman Segelke
- April 25 – Dave Owen
- April 26 – Bill Lyons
- April 29 – Steve Crawford

=== May ===
- May 5
  - José Castro
  - Dave Gumpert
- May 6 – Keefe Cato
- May 9 – Doug Loman
- May 11
  - Mark Huismann
  - Walt Terrell
- May 18 – Andre David
- May 19 – Fritzie Connally
- May 21 – Paul Runge
- May 23 – Nelson Norman
- May 24 – Mike Richardt
- May 28
  - Bill Doran
  - Ed Olwine
- May 29
  - Jamie Allen
  - Mike Stenhouse

=== June ===
- June 2 – Jack O'Connor
- June 4 – Ricky Jones
- June 7 – Tim Laudner
- June 8 – Carmen Castillo
- June 15 – Wade Boggs
- June 17 – Lester Strode
- June 19 – Butch Davis
- June 20
  - Phil Huffman
  - Dickie Thon
- June 23 – Marty Barrett
- June 24 – Tom Klawitter
- June 28
  - Clay Christiansen
  - Rafael Vásquez

=== July ===
- July 7
  - Glenn Hoffman
  - Tim Teufel
- July 11 – Mike Fuentes
- July 21 – Dave Henderson
- July 22 – Tatsunori Hara
- July 25 – Marc Sullivan
- July 26 – Marty Bystrom
- July 30 – Scott Fletcher

=== August ===
- August 5 – Reid Nichols
- August 8 – Alan Fowlkes
- August 9 – Matt Young
- August 11 – Dorn Taylor
- August 12 – Rusty McNealy
- August 15
  - Joe Cowley
  - Tom Dodd
  - Bob James
  - Randy Johnson
- August 16 – Jim Maler
- August 18 – Don Crow
- August 19
  - Luis DeLeón
  - Gary Gaetti
- August 23 – Julio Franco
- August 31 – Von Hayes

=== September ===
- September 4
  - Rod Booker
  - Paul Householder
- September 7 – Bill Schroeder
- September 11
  - Brad Lesley
  - Don Slaught
- September 16 – Orel Hershiser
- September 17 – Tom Waddell
- September 18
  - Scott Holman
  - Roger Mason
- September 20 – Jim Siwy
- September 22 – Dave Sax
- September 24 – Jim Acker
- September 25
  - Ron Mathis
  - Larry White
- September 28
  - Pete Filson
  - Jerry Layne
  - Rob Manfred
  - Ronn Reynolds

=== October ===
- October 3 – Daryl Sconiers
- October 5
  - Randy Bush
  - Brent Gaff
- October 25
  - Tom Romano
  - Dave Von Ohlen
- October 26
  - Ed Vande Berg
  - Frank Wills
- October 31
  - Ray Soff
  - Paul Zuvella

=== November ===
- November 1 – Rich Thompson
- November 2 – Willie McGee
- November 5
  - Mike Bishop
  - Tom Wiedenbauer
- November 7 – Reggie Patterson
- November 8
  - Bobby Moore
  - Paul Wilmet
- November 10 – Omar Minaya
- November 13 – Dan Petry
- November 16 – Paul Serna
- November 18 – Cliff Pastornicky
- November 19 – Mike Winters
- November 21 – Mike Mason
- November 22
  - Lee Guetterman
  - Ricky Wright
- November 25 – Chico Walker
- November 27 – Mike Scioscia
- November 28
  - Pat Murphy
  - Dave Righetti
- November 30
  - Toby Hernández
  - Steve Shields

=== December ===
- December 3 – Mike Martin
- December 5 – Scott Munninghoff
- December 10 – Dom Chiti
- December 16
  - Rondin Johnson
  - Ted Wilborn
- December 18 – Scott Nielsen
- December 22
  - Glenn Wilson
  - George Wright
- December 23 – Tim Leary
- December 25
  - Gerry Davis
  - Rickey Henderson

== Deaths ==
=== January ===
- January 10 – John Terry, 80, pitcher who played with the Detroit Tigers in 1902 and for the St. Louis Browns in 1903.
- January 12 – Lefty Webb, 72, pitcher for the 1910 Pittsburgh Pirates.
- January 14 – Percy Miller, 60, southpaw pitcher and first baseman who played for at least nine Negro leagues teams (primarily the St. Louis Stars and Nashville Elite Giants) between 1921 and 1937; managed the Detroit Stars of the Negro American League for part of the 1937 season.
- January 23
  - Harry Baldwin, 57, pitcher who played from 1924 to 1925 for the New York Giants.
  - Walter Lonergan, 72, shortstop for the 1911 Boston Red Sox.
  - Al Tedrow, 66, who pitched in four games for the Cleveland Naps in 1914.
- January 24 – Admiral Schlei, 80, catcher for the Cincinnati Reds and New York Giants over eight seasons from 1904 to 1911.
- January 31 – Harry O'Donnell, 63, backup catcher for the Philadelphia Phillies in its 1927 season.

=== February ===
- February 1 – Mysterious Walker, 73, University of Chicago three-sport athlete with colorful personality, who later pitched for three major league teams from 1910 to 1913 before jumping to the outlaw Federal League in 1914–15, whose unusual moniker came after debuting professionally in the minors with the PCL San Francisco Seals, because he refused to take the field until umpires banished photographers, apparently trying to get away from public scrutiny, although curiously attracting attention as a ballplayer.
- February 2 – Johnnie Vivens, 61, pitcher for the 1929 St. Louis Stars of the Negro National League.
- February 4 – Ted Turner, 85, pitcher who appeared in just one game for the Chicago Cubs in its 1920 season.
- February 9 – Cowboy Jones, 83, 19th century pitcher who played with the Cleveland Spiders in 1898 and for the St. Louis Perfectos/Cardinals over three seasons from 1899 to 1901.
- February 10 – Elmer Jacobs, 65, starting pitcher who played for six different clubs in a span of nine seasons from 1914 to 1927, being named the Opening Day starter for the Pittsburgh Pirates in 1917 and the Philadelphia Phillies in 1919.
- February 28 – Henry Smoyer, 67, utility man who played in 1912 for the St. Louis Browns of the American League.

=== March ===
- March 9 – Skel Roach, 86, German-born pitcher for the Chicago Orphans during the 1899 season, who also spent nine seasons in the Minors Leagues between 1895 and 1905, and was hired as baseball coach by the University of Michigan in 1903.
- March 10
  - Leon Cadore, 68, starting pitcher for the Brooklyn Robins, Chicago White Sox and New York Giants over ten seasons from 1915 to 1924, who shares an MLB record for the most innings pitched in a single game while pitching for Brooklyn in 1920, when he joined fellow Boston Braves starter Joe Oeschger to pitch 26 innings without relief, which eventually ended in darkness and a 1–1 tie.
  - Earl Williams, 55, backup catcher for the 1928 Boston Braves.
- March 17 – Bob Blewett, 80, pitcher who played with the New York Giants in its 1902 season.
- March 20 – Gene Dale, 68, who pitched for the St. Louis Cardinals and the Cincinnati Reds in a span of four seasons from 1911 to 1916.
- March 23 – Harry Kelley, 52, pitcher who played for the Washington Senators and Philadelphia Athletics in all or part of six seasons between 1925 and 1939; led American League in games lost (21) in 1937.
- March 25
  - Al Shaw, 84, English-born catcher who played for the Detroit Tigers, Boston Americans, Chicago White Sox and Boston Doves, in part of four seasons spanning 1901–1909.
  - Clarence Kraft, 70, first baseman who appeared in three games for the Boston Braves in the 1914 season.
- March 28
  - Chuck Klein, 53, Hall of Fame slugging right fielder and two-time All-Star, primarily with the Philadelphia Phillies, who collected a career .320 batting average with 300 home runs and 1,201 runs batted in and is the only player in the 20th century to collect 200 or more hits in each of his first five full MLB seasons, while winning the National League MVP award in 1932 and a Triple Crown in 1933, to accompany his four home run titles, four home runs in one game, two RBI titles, a stolen base title and leading in runs scored three years in a row, setting a modern National League record with 158 runs in 1930 and leading all outfielders in assists three times, establishing in 1930 a Major League record for outfield assists with 44 which, like his runs scored mark, this record still stands as of the 2017 season.
  - Gus Thompson, 80, who pitched with the Pittsburgh Pirates in 1903 and for the St. Louis Cardinals in 1906.
- March 29 – Jimmy Archer, 74, Irish-born catcher who spent his career with six different teams, primarily for the Chicago Cubs from 1909 through 1917.

=== April ===
- April 10 – Hod Leverette, 68, pitcher for the 1920 St. Louis Browns.
- April 14
  - John Freeman, 57, reserve outfielder who played briefly for the Boston Red Sox in their 1927 season.
  - Red Smyth, 65, outfielder who played from 1915 through 1918 with the Brooklyn Robins and St. Louis Cardinals.
- April 20 – Chet Nourse, 70, pitcher for the 1909 Boston Red Sox.

=== May ===
- May 3 – Al Maul, 92, 19th century pitcher who played for ten different clubs over 15 seasons spanning 1884–1901, compiling an 84–80 career record in 188 games, while leading the National Leaque with a 2.45 earned run average in the 1895 season.
- May 5 – Ollie Chill, 79, umpire who worked 1,028 American League games (1914–1966, 1919–1922), plus eight games of the 1921 World Series
- May 14 – Billy Clingman, 88, 19th century third baseman and shortstop who played for seven teams in a span of ten seasons from 1890 to 1903.
- May 20
  - Frank Bird, 89, 19th century catcher who played in 1892 for the St. Louis Browns of the National League.
  - Cotton Minahan, 75, pitcher for the 1907 Cincinnati Reds.
- May 26 – Dwight Wertz, 69, shortstop for the 1914 Buffalo Buffeds of the outlaw Federal League, who was better known for his professional American football career in the Ohio League over three seasons between 1912 and 1914, where he won three consecutive championship titles while playing for different teams.
- May 28
  - Oscar Davis, 62, infielder/outfielder for the 1926 Dayton Marcos of the Negro National League.
  - Kid Nance, 81, outfielder who played with the Louisville Colonels of the National League from 1897 to 1898, and then for the Detroit Tigers of the American League in 1901.

=== June ===
- June 6 – Bert Daniels, 75, speedy outfielder who played for the New York Highlanders and Yankees in four seasons from 1910 to 1913, and for the Cincinnati Reds in 1914.
- June 9 – John Fick, 37, who pitched in four games with the 1944 Philadelphia Phillies.
- June 10 – John Vann, 68, catcher who made an appearance as a pinch hitter for the St. Louis Cardinals in 1913.
- June 13 – Tom Stankard, 76, infielder for the Pittsburgh Pirates in its 1904 season.
- June 16 – Jack Phillips, 76, pitcher who appeared in just une game for the 1945 New York Giants.
- June 23 – George Boehler, 66, valuable swingman pitcher whose career spanned 20 years including major league stints with the Detroit Tigers St. Louis Browns, Pittsburgh Pirates and Brooklyn Robins over nine seasons from 1912 to 1926, while collecting 20 or more wins in seven minor league seasons, with a career-high 38 wins for the Tulsa Oilers of the Western League in 1922.

=== July ===
- July 2
  - Carlos Moore, 51, relief pitcher in four games for the 1930 Washington Senators.
  - Yip Owens, 72, Canadian catcher who played for the Boston Americans, Chicago White Sox, Brooklyn Tip-Tops and Baltimore Terrapins in part of four seasons spanning 1905–1915.
- July 3 – Paul Smith, 70, left fielder for the 1916 Cincinnati Reds.
- July 7 – John Sullivan, 64, pitcher who played for the Chicago White Sox in its 1919 season.
- July 8 – Bill McAfee, 50, pitcher who played for the Chicago Cubs, Boston Braves, Washington Senators and St. Louis Browns in a span of five seasons from 1930 to 1934.
- July 13 – Johnie Watson, 62, outfielder for the Detroit Stars of the Negro National League (1922–1924, 1926).
- July 22 – Grover Land, 73, catcher who played for the Cleveland Naps in part of three seasons from 1908 to 1913 before joining the Brooklyn Tip-Tops in 1914–1915.
- July 24 – Virgil Barnes, 63, pitcher who played from 1919 through 1928 for the New York Giants and Boston Braves.
- July 25 – Dizzy Nutter, 74, outfielder for the 1919 Boston Braves.
- July 26 – Walter Bernhardt, 65, pitcher who appeared in one game with the New York Yankees in 1918.
- July 27
  - Art Corcoran, 63, two-sport athlete who played as a third baseman for the Philadelphia Athletics in 1915, and served as a halfback for five National Football League teams over four seasons from 1920 to 1923.
  - Phil Page, 52, southpaw pitcher who appeared in 31 games for the Detroit Tigers from 1928 to 1930 and Brooklyn Dodgers in 1934; minor league manager and scout for the New York Yankees; MLB coach for the Cincinnati Reds from 1947 through 1952.
- July 28 – Lu Blue, 61, World War I veteran who put together a solid 13-year major league career after his discharge, playing first base with the Detroit Tigers from 1921 to 1924, being traded to the St. Louis Browns in 1927 and staying with them until 1931, when he joined the Chicago White Sox for two years before ending his career with the Brooklyn Dodgers in 1933, collecting a .287/.402/.401 batting line with a .989 fielding average, being ranked as the 77th best first baseman in Major League history, according to baseball historian Bill James.

=== August ===
- August 1 – Ike Boone, 61, part-time MLB outfielder who hit a .321/.394/.475 line with 26 home runs and 194 runs batted in through 356 games with four major-league clubs from 1922 to 1932; nevertheless, Boone is remembered as one of the greatest minor-leaguers of all-time: he led the Texas League in 1923 with a .402 batting average and 125 RBI while playing for the San Antonio Bears, posting a league-record 35-game hitting streak during the season, as his 241 base hits obliterated the league record; afterwards, Boone played for the Mission Reds of the Pacific Coast League in 1929, hitting .407 with 55 homers and 218 RBI, setting a league record with 553 total bases while delivering 323 hits, two hits short of matching the all-time PCL record for hits in a single season, set by Paul Strand with 325 hits; overall, Boone batted .300 or better in 12 of his 14 minors seasons, including .400 or more four times; inducted into the International League Hall of Fame and the Pacific Coast League Hall of Fame.
- August 4 – Bob Gamble, 91, 19th-century pitcher who played in 1888 for the Philadelphia Athletics of the American Association.
- August 8 – Fred Winchell, 76, Canadian pitcher who appeared in four games for the Cleveland Naps in its 1909 season.
- August 18 – Archie Stimmel, 85, pitcher who played from 1900 through 1902 for the Cincinnati Reds.
- August 22 – Dummy Taylor, 83, the only successful deaf pitcher in Major League Baseball, who was a vital part of the New York Giants in the early years of the 20th Century, helping them clinch three National League pennants and the 1905 World Series title.
- August 23 – Bill Breckinridge, 50, pitcher who played for the 1929 Philadelphia Athletics.
- August 28
  - Jean Dubuc, 69, pitcher for the Cincinnati Reds, Detroit Tigers, Boston Red Sox and New York Giants in all or part of nine seasons spanning 1908–1919, whose name was mentioned during the Black Sox Scandal investigation in the summer of 1921, but he was neither a participant nor a conspirator in the scandal, even though he was pursued for his guilty knowledge of the fix.
  - Eddie Stack, 70, pitcher who played for the Philadelphia Phillies, Brooklyn Dodgers and Chicago Cubs in a span of five seasons from 1910 to 1914.
  - Sid Womack, 61, backup catcher for the 1926 Boston Braves.
- August 30 – Frank Demaree, 48, two-time All-Star outfielder whose career included stints with the Chicago Cubs, New York Giants, Boston Braves, St. Louis Cardinals and St. Louis Browns over twelve seasons from 1932 to 1944, winning four National League pennants with the Cubs (1932; 1935; 1938) and Cardinals (1943), as well as one American League pennant with the Browns (1944), being also one of four players to reach the 30–30 club in Pacific Coast League history (1934), along with Hall of Famer Tony Lazzeri (1925), Lefty O'Doul (1927) and Joc Pederson (2014).
- August 31 – George Quellich, 55, left fielder who played 13 games for the 1931 Detroit Tigers, all as a replacement for the team's slugger John Stone, but earned his place in baseball history by setting a record that has never been equaled at any level of professional baseball, with fifteen consecutive hits while playing for the Reading Coal Barons of the International League in 1929, which included one grand slam, four home runs, a double and ten singles. Immediately following the end of his string, Quellich collected 13 hits in his next 18 at-bats.

=== September ===
- September 4
  - Red Killefer, 73, who spent 35 years in Organized Baseball as a player, coach, manager, team president and owner of a minor league team named after him, being known as a hot-tempered, fiery and passionate utility man able to play any position but pitcher in a seven-year, major league career with the Detroit Tigers, Washington Senators, Cincinnati Reds and New York Giants from 1907 to 1916, and later becoming a successful manager minor league manager for 25 years from 1917 to 1941, while compiling a managerial record of 1,940–1,800 (519), 13th best in minor league history; brother of "Reindeer" Bill Killefer.
  - Ward Miller, 74, fourth outfielder for the Pittsburgh Pirates, Cincinnati Reds, Chicago Cubs, St. Louis Terriers and St. Louis Browns over part of eight seasons spanning 1909–1917.
- September 6
  - Tommy de la Cruz, 46, Cuban pitcher for the 1944 Cincinnati Reds, who was one of many ballplayers to appear only in the majors during World War II.
  - Hugh Hill, 79, outfielder who played with the Cleveland Naps in 1903 and for the St. Louis Cardinals in 1904.
- September 7 – Wally Gilbert, 57, third baseman who played from 1928 through 1932 for the Brooklyn Robins and Cincinnati Reds.
- September 10 – Arlas Taylor, 82, pitcher for the 1921 Philadelphia Athletics.
- September 15 – Snuffy Stirnweiss, 39, two-time All-Star second baseman who played for the New York Yankees between 1943 and 1950, winning three World Series rings with them and the 1945 American League batting championship with a .309 average, leading also the league twice in runs scored, hits, triples and stolen bases, and once in slugging and total bases.
- September 23 – Bill Mundy, 69, first baseman for the 1913 Boston Red Sox.
- September 24 – Bill Jackson, 58, outfielder and first baseman who played from 1914 to 1915 for the Chicago Whales club of the outlaw Federal League.
- September 26 – Raleigh Aitchison, 70, pitcher who played for the Brooklyn Dodgers and Robins teams in part of three seasons spanning 1911–1915.
- September 27 – Joe Berry, 53, pitcher for the Chicago Cubs, Philadelphia Athletics, and Cleveland Indians over four seasons from 1942 to 1946.

=== October ===
- October 2 – Bill Forman, 71, pitcher for the Washington Senators over two seasons from 1909 to 1910.
- October 7 – Chick Brandom, 71, pitcher who played with the Pittsburgh Pirates and Newark Peppers in a span of three seasons from 1908 to 1915.
- October 11 − Ira Thomas, 77, catcher who played from 1906 through 1915 for the New York Highlanders, Detroit Tigers and Philadelphia Athletics, being also a member of three Athletics clubs that won the World Series from 1910 to 1911 and 1913.
- October 12 – Oscar Boone, 47, catcher/first baseman who appeared for the Indianapolis ABCs/Atlanta Black Crackers, Baltimore Elite Giants and Chicago American Giants of the Negro leagues between 1939 and 1941.
- October 20 – Rex Dawson, 69, pitcher for the 1913 Washington Senators.
- October 21 – Lep Long, 70, pitcher who made four game appearances with the Philadelphia Athletics in its 1911 season.
- October 26 – Erwin Renfer, 65, pitcher for the 1913 Detroit Tigers.

=== November ===
- November 3
  - Heinie Sand, 61, shortstop who played for the Philadelphia Phillies in a span of six seasons from 1923 to 1928.
  - John Eubank, 86, swingman pitcher who played for the Detroit Tigers over three seasons from 1905 to 1907.
- November 6
  - Ernie Diehl, 81, backup outfielder who played for the Pittsburgh Pirates, Boston Beaneaters and Boston Doves in part of four seasons spanning 1903–1909.
  - Al Mattern, 75, pitcher who played for the Boston Doves, Rustlers, and Braves teams from 1908 to 1912.
- November 9 – Walt Meinert, 67, right fielder for the 1913 St. Louis Browns.
- November 13 – Heinie Elder, 68, pitcher for the Detroit Tigers in its 1913 season.
- November 14 – Jack Owens, 50, catcher who played in two games with the Philadelphia Athletics in 1935.
- November 15 – Harry Riconda, 61, third baseman who played with the Philadelphia Athletics, Boston Braves, Brooklyn Robins, Pittsburgh Pirates and Cincinnati Reds in part of six seasons between 1923 and 1930.
- November 17 – Mort Cooper, 45, pitcher for the St. Louis Cardinals, Boston Braves, New York Giants and Chicago Cubs over 12 seasons from 1938 to 1949; selected to four National League All-Star teams (1942–1943 and 1945–1946); led NL with 22 wins, 10 shutouts and a 1.78 ERA in 1942, earning Most Valuable Player honors, while anchoring Cardinals' pitching staff during three consecutive pennant-winning seasons (1942–1944), when he won over 20 games three times and earned two World Series rings (1942, 1944); brother Walker, an All-Star catcher, was frequently his battery mate.
- November 20 – Bill Lathrop, 67, pitcher who played for the Chicago White Sox in part of two seasons from 1913 to 1914.
- November 21 – Mel Ott, 49, Hall of Fame right fielder and 12-time All-Star who played his 22-season big league career with the New York Giants from 1926 to 1947; jumped from his high school team into the majors as a 17-year-old, and a member of Giants' 1933 World Series champions; led the National League in home runs and walks six times, in runs scored, triples and outfield double plays twice, and in runs batted in once, ending his career with a .304/.414/.533 batting line, 511 home runs, 488 doubles, 2,876 hits, 9,456 runs and 1,860 RBI in 2,730 games played; also managed Giants from 1942 to July 15, 1948, to a 464–530 (.467) record; becoming a broadcaster, he served on the Detroit Tigers' radio/TV team from 1956 until his death.
- November 24 – Roy Corhan, 71, shortstop who played with the Chicago White Sox in 1911 and for the St. Louis Cardinals in 1916.
- November 27 – Harry G. Salsinger, 71, sportswriter for the Detroit News for over 50 years.

=== December ===
- December 4 – Red Murray, 74, right fielder for three National League clubs from 1906 to 1917, whose combination of power, fielding and speed on the bases guided the New York Giants to three pennants from 1911 to 1913, while leading all outfielders in assists in 1909 and 1910, becoming the only outfielder in the modern era to accumulate more than 100 assists during the period of 1907 to 1910, and also one of only three players in the same period to finish twice among the top five in home runs and stolen bases during the same season (1908–1909), joining Honus Wagner (1907–1908) and Ty Cobb (1909–1910).
- December 8
  - Bernie Friberg, 59, valuable utility man who was able to play all nine defensive positions in a 14-season career for the Chicago Cubs, Philadelphia Phillies and Boston Red Sox between 1919 and 1933.
  - Tris Speaker, 70, Hall of Fame center fielder highly regarded for both his batting and his fielding in a 22-year career, who earned American League MVP honors in 1912 and led the Boston Red Sox to a World Series title, then another World Series title in 1915, also carrying the Cleveland Indians to its first World Series championship in 1920 as a player/manager, while compiling 3,514 hits and posting a .345 career average –sixth on the all-time list– including 792 doubles –a career record that nobody has surpassed–, and leading the league in putouts seven times and in double plays six times, as his career totals in both categories are still major-league records at his position.
- December 9 – Rube Vickers, 80, pitcher who played from 1902 through 1909 for the Brooklyn Superbas, Cincinnati Reds, and Philadelphia Athletics.
- December 10 – Cozy Dolan, 75, outfielder/third baseman who played 379 games for six teams, primarily the St. Louis Cardinals, over seven years spanning 1909 to 1922; as coach for 1921–1924 New York Giants, he was a part of four National League and two World Series (1921, 1922) champions, but was suspended for life by Commissioner Kenesaw Mountain Landis after being implicated in a scheme to bribe a Philadelphia player to deliberately lose the last game of 1924 season.
- December 15 – Harry Heitmann, 62, pitcher for the 1918 Brooklyn Robins.
- December 16
  - Bill Corum, 63, New York sportswriter and sportscaster who covered the 1920s Brooklyn Robins and New York Giants and later worked World Series games on radio alongside Red Barber; became best known for announcing the Kentucky Derby and as a key figure in thoroughbred racing.
  - Les Scarsella, 45, first baseman and left fielder who played with the Cincinnati Reds and Boston Bees in part of four seasons between 1935 and 1940.
- December 24 – Jim Boyle, 54, catcher for the New York Giants, who has the distinction of having one of the shortest known Major League Baseball careers, while catching for only one inning in a game against the Pittsburgh Pirates on June 20, 1926, without registering an at bat appearance.
- December 27 – Julio Rojo, 64, Cuban-born catcher who was the regular receiver for the Baltimore Black Sox (1923–1927) and New York Lincoln Giants (1928–1929) of the Eastern Colored League.
- December 30
  - Jim Hickman, 66, backup outfielder for the Baltimore Terrapins and Brooklyn Robins in four seasons from 1915 to 1919.
  - Glenn Spencer, 53, pitcher who played from 1928 to 1933 with the Pittsburgh Pirates and New York Giants.
- December 31 – Jack Doyle, 89, Irish-born first baseman whose solid 17-year playing career includes a National League Championship with the Baltimore Orioles in 1896 and two stints as manager of the New York Giants in 1895 and the Washington Senators in 1898, while leading the National League first basemen with 96 assists in 1900 and 1.418 putouts in 1903, and collecting a career slash line of .299/.351/.385 with 971 runs batted in and 518 stolen bases in 1,569 games.
