= 1958 Cleveland Indians season =

1958 Cleveland Indians
- League: American League
- Ballpark: Cleveland Municipal Stadium
- City: Cleveland, Ohio
- Owners: William R. Daley
- General managers: Frank Lane
- Managers: Bobby Bragan, Joe Gordon
- Television: WEWS-TV (Ken Coleman, Bill McColgan)
- Radio: WERE (Jimmy Dudley, Bob Neal)

The 1958 Cleveland Indians season was the 58th season for the franchise, the 44th as the Indians and the 27th season at Cleveland Stadium. They improved upon their 76–77 campaign from the previous season, but missed the playoffs for the 4th consecutive season, finishing the season at 77–76.

== Offseason ==
- December 4, 1957: Early Wynn and Al Smith were traded by the Indians to the Chicago White Sox for Minnie Miñoso and Fred Hatfield.
- January 29, 1958: Mickey Vernon was selected off waivers by the Indians from the Boston Red Sox.
- February 18, 1958: Hank Aguirre and Jim Hegan were traded by the Indians to the Detroit Tigers for Jay Porter and Hal Woodeshick.
- February 25, 1958: Pete Mesa (minors) was traded by the Indians to the Washington Senators for Milt Bolling.
- March 27, 1958: Vito Valentinetti and Milt Bolling were traded by the Indians to the Detroit Tigers for Pete Wojey and $20,000.
- Prior to 1958 season (exact date unknown)
  - Doc Edwards was signed as an amateur free agent by the Indians.
  - Jim Weaver was signed as an amateur free agent by the Indians.

== Regular season ==
- May 17, 1958: Carroll Hardy hit his first major league home run when he pinch hit for Roger Maris in the 11th inning of a 4–4 tie against the Chicago White Sox.
- June 26, 1958: First-year skipper Bobby Bragan was fired after 67 games, the shortest stint (at the time) for a Cleveland Indians manager. Cleveland was 31–36 (.463) and in sixth place at the time. Former Tribe All-Star second baseman Joe Gordon took the reins on June 27, and led the Indians to a 46–40 (.535) mark for the rest of the season.

=== Season standings ===
American League
Team	W	L	Pct.	GB	Home	Road
New York Yankees	92	62	.597	—	44‍–‍33	48‍–‍29
Chicago White Sox	82	72	.532	10	47‍–‍30	35‍–‍42
Boston Red Sox	79	75	.513	13	49‍–‍28	30‍–‍47
Cleveland Indians	77	76	.503	14½	42‍–‍34	35‍–‍42
Detroit Tigers	77	77	.500	15	43‍–‍34	34‍–‍43
Baltimore Orioles	74	79	.484	17½	46‍–‍31	28‍–‍48
Kansas City Athletics	73	81	.474	19	43‍–‍34	30‍–‍47
Washington Senators	61	93	.396	31	33‍–‍44	28‍–‍49

=== Record vs. opponents ===
1958 American League record Sources:
Team	BAL	BOS	CWS	CLE	DET	KCA	NYY	WSH
Baltimore	—	10–12	9–13–1	10–11	10–12	12–10	8–14	15–7
Boston	12–10	—	10–12	12–10	10–12	12–10	9–13–1	14–8
Chicago	13–9–1	12–10	—	12–10	10–12	12–10	7–15	16–6
Cleveland	11–10	10–12	10–12	—	14–8	10–12	7–15	15–7
Detroit	12–10	12–10	12–10	8–14	—	12–10	12–10	9–13
Kansas City	10–12	10–12	10–12	12–10	10–12	—	9–13	12–10–2
New York	14–8	13–9–1	15–7	15–7	10–12	13–9	—	12–10
Washington	7–15	8–14	6–16	7–15	13–9	10–12–2	10–12	—

=== Notable transactions ===
- June 12, 1958: Chico Carrasquel was traded by the Indians to the Kansas City Athletics for Billy Hunter.
- June 15, 1958: Roger Maris, Dick Tomanek and Preston Ward were traded by the Indians to the Kansas City Athletics for Woodie Held and Vic Power.
- July 2, 1958: Bob Lemon was released by the Indians.
- July 2, 1958: Morrie Martin was selected off waivers by the Indians from the St. Louis Cardinals.
- August 4, 1958: Randy Jackson was purchased by the Indians from the Los Angeles Dodgers.
- August 23, 1958: Hoyt Wilhelm was selected off waivers from the Indians by the Baltimore Orioles.

=== Opening Day Lineup ===
Opening Day Starters
#	Name	Position
17	Chico Carrasquel	SS
5	Roger Maris	RF
9	Minnie Miñoso	LF
14	Larry Doby	CF
8	Mickey Vernon	1B
15	Russ Nixon	C
7	Fred Hatfield	3B
16	Billy Moran	2B
27	Herb Score	P

=== Roster ===
1958 Cleveland Indians
Roster
Pitchers: 39 Gary Bell; 48 Dick Brodowski; 32 Chuck Churn; 37 Jim Constable; 34 Don Ferrarese; 25 Mike Garcia; 33 Mudcat Grant; 37 Bob Kelly; 21 Bob Lemon; 32 Morrie Martin; 22 Cal McLish; 12 Don Mossi; 20 Ray Narleski; 35 Steve Ridzik; 27 Herb Score; 29 Dick Tomanek; 26 Hoyt Wilhelm; 28 Hal Woodeshick	Catchers: 11 Dick Brown; 15 Russ Nixon; 4 Jay Porter; Infielders: 2 Earl Averill, Jr.; 1 Bobby Ávila; 17 Chico Carrasquel; 38 Billy Harrell; 7 Fred Hatfield; 7 Billy Hunter; 2 Randy Jackson; 16 Billy Moran; 10 Vic Power; 16 Larry Raines; 8 Mickey Vernon; 36 Preston Ward; 23 Vic Wertz	Outfielders: 6 Rocky Colavito; 14 Larry Doby; 31 Gary Geiger; 29 Rod Graber; 30 Carroll Hardy; 3 Woodie Held; 5 Roger Maris; 9 Minnie Miñoso; Other batters: 18 Hal Naragon	Manager: 2 Bobby Bragan; 35 Joe Gordon; Coaches: 43 Mel Harder (Pitching); 42 Red Kress (First Base); 40 Bill Lobe (Bullpen); 44 Eddie Stanky (Third Base)

== Player stats ==
=== Batting ===
==== Starters by position ====
Note: Pos = Position; G = Games played; AB = At bats; H = Hits; Avg. = Batting average; HR = Home runs; RBI = Runs batted in

Pos	Player	G	AB	H	Avg.	HR	RBI
C	Russ Nixon	113	376	113	.301	9	46
1B	Mickey Vernon	119	355	104	.293	8	55
2B	Bobby Ávila	113	375	95	.253	5	30
SS	Billy Hunter	76	190	37	.195	0	9
3B	Vic Power	93	385	122	.317	12	53
LF	Minnie Miñoso	149	556	168	.302	24	80
CF	Larry Doby	89	247	70	.285	13	45
RF	Rocky Colavito	143	489	148	.303	41	113

==== Other batters ====
Note: G = Games played; AB = At bats; H = Hits; Avg. = Batting average; HR = Home runs; RBI = Runs batted in

Player	G	AB	H	Avg.	HR	RBI
Billy Moran	115	257	58	.226	1	18
Billy Harrell	101	229	50	.218	7	19
Gary Geiger	91	195	45	.231	1	6
Roger Maris	51	182	41	.225	9	27
Dick Brown	68	173	41	.237	7	20
Chico Carrasquel	49	156	40	.225	9	27
Preston Ward	48	148	50	.338	4	21
Woodie Held	67	144	28	.194	3	17
Randy Jackson	29	91	22	.242	4	13
Jay Porter	40	85	17	.200	4	19
Earl Averill Jr.	17	55	10	.182	2	7
Carroll Hardy	27	49	10	.204	1	6
Vic Wertz	25	43	12	.279	3	12
Larry Raines	7	9	0	.000	0	0
Hal Naragon	9	9	3	.333	0	0
Rod Graber	4	8	1	.125	0	0
Fred Hatfield	3	8	1	.125	0	1

=== Pitching ===
==== Starting pitchers ====
Note: G = Games pitched; IP = Innings pitched; W = Wins; L = Losses; ERA = Earned run average; SO = Strikeouts

Player	G	IP	W	L	ERA	SO
Cal McLish	39	225.2	16	8	2.99	97
Gary Bell	33	182.0	12	10	3.31	110

==== Other pitchers ====
Note: G = Games pitched; IP = Innings pitched; W = Wins; L = Losses; ERA = Earned run average; SO = Strikeouts

Player	G	IP	W	L	ERA	SO
Mudcat Grant	44	204.0	10	11	3.84	111
Ray Narleski	44	183.1	13	10	4.07	102
Don Ferrarese	28	94.2	3	4	3.71	62
Hal Woodeshick	14	71.2	6	6	3.64	27
Dick Tomanek	18	57.2	2	3	5.62	42
Herb Score	12	41.0	2	3	3.95	48
Bob Kelly	13	27.2	0	2	5.20	12
Jim Constable	6	9.1	0	1	11.57	3
Mike Garcia	6	8.0	1	0	9.00	2

==== Relief pitchers ====
Note: G = Games pitched; W = Wins; L = Losses; SV = Saves; ERA = Earned run average; SO = Strikeouts

Player	G	W	L	SV	ERA	SO
Hoyt Wilhelm	30	2	7	5	2.49	57
Don Mossi	43	7	8	3	3.90	55
Morrie Martin	14	2	0	1	2.41	5
Bob Lemon	11	0	1	0	5.33	8
Steve Ridzik	6	0	2	0	2.08	6
Chuck Churn	6	0	0	0	6.23	4
Dick Brodowski	5	1	0	0	0.00	12
Rocky Colavito	1	0	0	0	0.00	1
Gary Geiger	1	0	0	0	9.00	2

== Awards and honors ==
All-Star Game

== Farm system ==
Level	Team	League	Manager
AAA	San Diego Padres	Pacific Coast League	Catfish Metkovich
AA	Mobile Bears	Southern Association	Mel McGaha
A	Reading Indians	Eastern League	Clyde McCullough
B	Burlington Indians	Carolina League	Pinky May
C	Minot Mallards	Northern League	Ken Landenberger
D	Cocoa Indians	Florida State League	Paul O'Dea
D	North Platte Indians	Nebraska State League	Mark Wylie
D	Batavia Indians	New York–Penn League	Don Richmond

LEAGUE CHAMPIONS: Burlington, North Platte
