= 1958 Chicago White Sox season =

1958 Chicago White Sox
- League: American League
- Ballpark: Comiskey Park
- City: Chicago
- Owners: Dorothy Comiskey Rigney
- General managers: Chuck Comiskey/Johnny Rigney
- Managers: Al López
- Television: WGN-TV (Jack Brickhouse, Vince Lloyd)
- Radio: WCFL (Bob Elson, Don Wells)

The 1958 Chicago White Sox season was the team's 58th season in the major leagues, and its 59th season overall. They finished with a record of 82–72, good enough for second place in the American League, 10 games behind the first-place New York Yankees.

== Offseason ==
- December 4, 1957: Minnie Miñoso and Fred Hatfield were traded by the White Sox to the Cleveland Indians for Early Wynn and Al Smith.

== Regular season ==
=== Season standings ===
American League
Team	W	L	Pct.	GB	Home	Road
New York Yankees	92	62	.597	—	44‍–‍33	48‍–‍29
Chicago White Sox	82	72	.532	10	47‍–‍30	35‍–‍42
Boston Red Sox	79	75	.513	13	49‍–‍28	30‍–‍47
Cleveland Indians	77	76	.503	14½	42‍–‍34	35‍–‍42
Detroit Tigers	77	77	.500	15	43‍–‍34	34‍–‍43
Baltimore Orioles	74	79	.484	17½	46‍–‍31	28‍–‍48
Kansas City Athletics	73	81	.474	19	43‍–‍34	30‍–‍47
Washington Senators	61	93	.396	31	33‍–‍44	28‍–‍49

=== Record vs. opponents ===
1958 American League record Sources:
Team	BAL	BOS	CWS	CLE	DET	KCA	NYY	WSH
Baltimore	—	10–12	9–13–1	10–11	10–12	12–10	8–14	15–7
Boston	12–10	—	10–12	12–10	10–12	12–10	9–13–1	14–8
Chicago	13–9–1	12–10	—	12–10	10–12	12–10	7–15	16–6
Cleveland	11–10	10–12	10–12	—	14–8	10–12	7–15	15–7
Detroit	12–10	12–10	12–10	8–14	—	12–10	12–10	9–13
Kansas City	10–12	10–12	10–12	12–10	10–12	—	9–13	12–10–2
New York	14–8	13–9–1	15–7	15–7	10–12	13–9	—	12–10
Washington	7–15	8–14	6–16	7–15	13–9	10–12–2	10–12	—

=== Opening Day lineup ===
- Luis Aparicio, SS
- Nellie Fox, 2B
- Billy Goodman, 3B
- Sherm Lollar, C
- Tito Francona, RF
- Earl Torgeson, 1B
- Al Smith, LF
- Bubba Phillips, CF
- Billy Pierce, P

=== Notable transactions ===
- June 15, 1958: Bill Fischer and Tito Francona were traded by the White Sox to the Detroit Tigers for Ray Boone and Bob Shaw.
- June 24, 1958: Walt Dropo was selected off waivers from the White Sox by the Cincinnati Redlegs.

=== Roster ===
1958 Chicago White Sox
Roster
Pitchers: 22 Dick Donovan; 20 Bill Fischer; 28 Dixie Howell; 15 Bob Keegan; 18 Barry Latman; 27 Turk Lown; 36 Jim McDonald; 28 Stover McIlwain; 29 Ray Moore; 19 Billy Pierce; 31,36 Tom Qualters; 27,15 Don Rudolph; 32,35 Bob Shaw; 21 Gerry Staley; 3 Hal Trosky, Jr.; 30 Jim Wilson; 24 Early Wynn	Catchers: 26 Earl Battey; 31 Chuck Lindstrom; 10 Sherm Lollar; 20 Johnny Romano; Infielders: 11 Luis Aparicio; 3,8 Ray Boone; 8 Walt Dropo; 14 Sammy Esposito; 2 Nellie Fox; 6 Billy Goodman; 4 Ron Jackson; 5 Bubba Phillips; 17 Earl Torgeson	Outfielders: 16 Ted Beard; 9 Johnny Callison; 31 Norm Cash; 3 Tito Francona; 1 Jim Landis; 48 Jim McAnany; 32 Don Mueller; 7 Jim Rivera; 9,16 Al Smith; Other batters: 12 Les Moss	Manager: 42 Al López; Coaches: 37 Ray Berres; 34 Johnny Cooney; 33 Tony Cuccinello; 39 Don Gutteridge

== Player stats ==
= Indicates team leader

= Indicates league leader

=== Batting ===
Note: G = Games played; AB = At bats; R = Runs scored; H = Hits; 2B = Doubles; 3B = Triples; HR = Home runs; RBI = Runs batted in; BB = Base on balls; SO = Strikeouts; AVG = Batting average; SB = Stolen bases

Player	G	AB	R	H	2B	3B	HR	RBI	BB	SO	AVG	SB
Luis Aparicio, SS	145	557	76	148	20	9	2	40	35	38	.266	29
Earl Battey, C	68	168	24	38	8	0	8	26	24	34	.226	1
Ted Beard, OF	19	22	5	2	0	0	1	2	6	5	.091	3
Ray Boone, 1B	77	246	25	60	12	1	7	41	18	33	.244	1
Johnny Callison, LF	18	64	10	19	4	2	1	12	6	14	.297	1
Norm Cash, OF	13	8	2	2	0	0	0	0	0	1	.250	0
Walt Dropo, 1B	28	52	3	10	1	0	2	8	5	11	.192	0
Sammy Esposito, 3B, SS	98	81	16	20	3	0	0	3	12	6	.247	1
Nellie Fox, 2B	155	623	82	187	21	6	0	49	47	11	.300	5
Tito Francona, RF, LF	41	128	10	33	3	2	1	10	14	24	.258	2
Billy Goodman, 3B	116	425	41	127	15	5	0	40	37	21	.299	1
Ron Jackson, 1B	61	146	19	34	4	0	7	21	18	46	.233	2
Jim Landis, CF	142	523	72	145	23	7	15	64	52	80	.277	19
Charlie Lindstrom, C	1	1	1	1	0	1	0	1	1	0	1.000	0
Sherm Lollar, C	127	421	53	115	16	0	20	84	57	37	.273	2
Jim McAnany, RF	5	13	0	0	0	0	0	0	0	5	.000	0
Les Moss, PH	2	1	0	0	0	0	0	0	1	0	.00	0
Don Mueller, RF	70	166	7	42	5	0	0	16	11	9	.253	0
Bubba Phillips, 3B, OF	84	260	26	71	10	0	5	30	15	14	.273	3
Jim Rivera, OF	116	276	37	62	8	4	9	35	24	49	.225	21
John Romano, C	4	7	1	2	0	0	0	1	1	0	.286	0
Al Smith, LF, RF	139	480	61	121	23	5	12	58	48	77	.252	3
Earl Torgeson, 1B	96	188	37	50	8	0	10	30	48	29	.266	7

Player	G	AB	R	H	2B	3B	HR	RBI	BB	SO	AVG	SB
Dick Donovan, P	34	80	5	9	0	0	0	1	10	33	.113	0
Bill Fischer, P	17	7	0	1	1	0	0	1	0	1	.143	0
Bob Keegan, P	14	4	0	0	0	0	0	1	0	0	.000	0
Barry Latman, P	13	12	2	1	0	0	0	0	2	7	.083	0
Turk Lown, P	27	9	0	3	0	0	0	2	0	3	.333	0
Stover McIlwain, P	1	1	0	0	0	0	0	0	0	0	.000	0
Ray Moore, P	32	44	1	9	2	0	1	2	2	13	.205	0
Billy Pierce, P	35	83	10	17	3	0	0	4	4	13	.205	0
Tom Qualters, P	26	2	0	0	0	0	0	0	2	2	.000	0
Bob Shaw, P	29	14	0	0	0	0	0	0	3	7	.000	0
Gerry Staley, P	50	11	0	0	0	0	0	1	1	5	.000	0
Jim Wilson, P	28	51	1	4	0	0	0	0	4	16	.078	0
Early Wynn, P	40	75	7	15	1	0	0	11	10	25	.200	0
Team totals	155	5249	634	1348	191	42	101	594	518	669	.257	101

=== Pitching ===
Note: W = Wins; L = Losses; ERA = Earned run average; G = Games pitched; GS = Games started; SV = Saves; IP = Innings pitched; H = Hits allowed; R = Runs allowed; ER = Earned runs allowed; HR = Home runs allowed; BB = Walks allowed; K = Strikeouts

Player	W	L	ERA	G	GS	SV	IP	H	R	ER	HR	BB	K
Dick Donovan	15	14	3.01	34	34	0	248.0	240	92	83	23	58	127
Bill Fischer	2	3	6.69	17	3	0	36.1	43	28	27	6	14	16
Dixie Howell	0	0	0.00	1	0	0	1.2	0	0	0	0	0	0
Bob Keegan	0	2	6.07	14	2	0	29.2	44	25	20	9	22	8
Barry Latman	3	0	0.76	13	3	0	47.2	27	7	4	1	17	28
Turk Lown	3	3	3.98	27	0	8	40.2	49	22	18	1	32	40
Jim McDonald	0	0	19.29	3	0	0	2.1	6	8	5	1	4	0
Stover McIlwain	0	0	2.25	1	1	0	4.0	4	1	1	1	0	4
Ray Moore	9	7	3.82	32	20	2	136.2	107	63	58	10	72	73
Billy Pierce	17	11	2.68	35	32	2	245.0	204	83	73	33	68	144
Tom Qualters	0	0	4.19	26	0	0	43.0	45	22	20	1	24	14
Don Rudolph	1	0	2.57	7	0	1	7.0	4	2	2	0	6	2
Bob Shaw	4	2	4.64	29	3	1	64.0	67	33	33	8	31	18
Gerry Staley	4	5	3.16	50	0	8	85.1	81	36	30	10	27	27
Hal Trosky	1	0	6.00	2	0	0	3.0	5	3	2	0	2	1
Jim Wilson	9	9	4.10	28	23	1	155.2	156	75	71	21	71	70
Early Wynn	14	16	4.13	40	34	2	239.2	214	115	110	27	107	179
Team totals	82	72	3.61	155	155	25	1389.2	1296	615	557	152	555	751

== Awards ==
- Luis Aparicio, Gold Glove Award
- Sherm Lollar, Gold Glove Award

== Farm system ==
Level	Team	League	Manager
AAA	Indianapolis Indians	American Association	Walker Cooper
A	Colorado Springs Sky Sox	Western League	Skeeter Scalzi
B	Davenport DavSox	Illinois–Indiana–Iowa League	Ira Hutchinson
C	Duluth-Superior White Sox	Northern League	Joe Hauser and Chips Sobek
D	Dubuque Packers	Midwest League	Frank Parenti
D	Holdrege White Sox	Nebraska State League	George Noga

LEAGUE CHAMPIONS: Colorado Springs
