= Lou Klimchock =

American baseball player (born 1939)

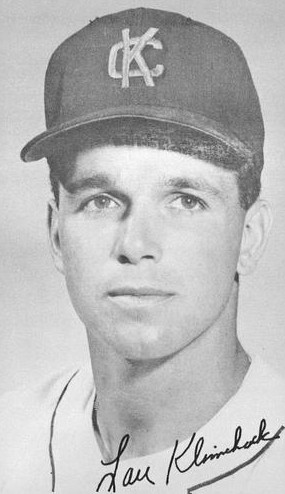
- Infielder
- Born: October 15, 1939 (age 86); Hostetter, Pennsylvania, U.S.
- Batted: Left Threw: Right

MLB debut
- September 27, 1958, for the Kansas City Athletics

Last MLB appearance
- August 2, 1970, for the Cleveland Indians

MLB statistics
- Batting average: .232
- Home runs: 13
- Runs batted in: 69
- Stats at Baseball Reference

Teams
- Kansas City Athletics (1958–1961); Milwaukee Braves (1962); Washington Senators (1963); Milwaukee Braves (1963–1965); New York Mets (1966); Cleveland Indians (1968–1970)

Louis Stephen Klimchock (born October 15, 1939) is an American former professional baseball infielder. He played parts of 12 seasons in Major League Baseball (MLB) for the Kansas City Athletics, Milwaukee Braves, Washington Senators, New York Mets and Cleveland Indians. Primarily a third baseman and second baseman, Klimchock batted left-handed and threw right-handed. He was listed as 5 feet 11 inches (1.80 m) tall and 180 pounds (82 kg).

Klimchock is the youngest player to lead off a game with a home run in major league history. On Sept. 28, 1958, the 18-year-old went deep against fellow White Sox rookie Stover McIlwain in the first inning in Chicago. It was the second game for the Athletics infielder in the majors.

A native of Hostetter, Pennsylvania, Klimchock graduated from Latrobe High School. His 15-season pro career began in 1957 and included two stellar seasons in minor league baseball: 1958, when he batted .389 with 25 home runs in the Class C Pioneer League, and 1963, when he hit .352 with 19 homers in 81 games played in the Triple-A Pacific Coast League.

In his most successful MLB campaign, Klimchock batted .287 in 90 games for the 1969 Indians. He also spent part of that season in the Pacific Coast League. All 12 of his major league seasons (1958–66; 1968–70) were punctuated by time spent in the minors.

During his MLB tenure, Klimchock played in 318 games and had 669 at bats, 64 runs, 155 hits, 21 doubles, 3 triples, 13 home runs, 69 RBI, 31 walks, .232 batting average, .264 on-base percentage, .330 slugging percentage, 221 total bases, 4 sacrifice hits, 6 sacrifice flies and 5 intentional walks.

Klimchock's grandson Mitch Nay, also a third baseman, was the 58th pick in the 2012 Major League Baseball draft. As of 2022, he was a member of the Los Angeles Angels organization.
