= Jerry Davie =

American baseball player (1933–2021)

Gerald Lee Davie
- Pitcher
- Born: February 10, 1933; Detroit, Michigan, U.S.
- Died: April 7, 2021 (aged 88); Haines City, Florida, U.S.
- Batted: Right Threw: Right

MLB debut
- April 14, 1959, for the Detroit Tigers

Last MLB appearance
- June 9, 1959, for the Detroit Tigers

MLB statistics
- Win–loss record: 2–2
- Earned run average: 4.17
- Strikeouts: 20
- Stats at Baseball Reference

Teams
- Detroit Tigers (1959)

Gerald Lee Davie (February 10, 1933 – April 7, 2021) was an American professional baseball player. He was a right-handed pitcher who appeared in one season (1959) and 11 games pitched in Major League Baseball for the Detroit Tigers. A Detroit native, he stood 6 feet (1.8 m) tall and weighed 180 pounds (82 kg) during his pro career.

Davie signed with the Tigers in 1952, but it would take him seven years (including two in military service) to reach the big league level. He made the 1959 Tiger roster out of spring training and pitched effectively in relief during April, earning him his first starting pitcher assignment on May 2 against the Washington Senators at Briggs Stadium. He was treated roughly, allowing five hits and four runs, all earned, in two innings of work. He took the loss in what would be a 15–3 thrashing at the hands of the Senators—the Tigers' 15th loss in 17 games. The catastrophic beginning of their season caused the dismissal of manager Bill Norman later that day.

The Tigers and Davie both rebounded after that defeat. Detroit rallied under new skipper Jimmy Dykes to finish fourth in the eight-team American League. Davie, meanwhile, won back-to-back starts on May 25 and 31, against the Kansas City Athletics and Cleveland Indians, working 8 1/3 innings on May 25 and throwing a complete game in his start six days later against Cleveland. But after a poor start against the Boston Red Sox on June 9, Davie was sent back to the Triple-A Charleston Senators and never returned to the Tigers. For his MLB career, he compiled a 2–2 record, with a 4.17 earned run average and 20 strikeouts in 36 2/3 innings pitched. He allowed 40 hits and 17 bases on balls.

Davie retired after the 1960 minor-league season.

Davie died on April 7, 2021, in Haines City, Florida.
