= Ossie Álvarez =

Cuban baseball player (1933–2008)

- Shortstop
- Born: October 19, 1933; Matanzas Province, Cuba
- Died: March 7, 2008 (aged 75); Guadalajara, Jalisco, Mexico
- Batted: Right Threw: Right

MLB debut
- April 19, 1958, for the Washington Senators

Last MLB appearance
- April 26, 1959, for the Detroit Tigers

MLB statistics
- Batting average: .212
- Runs batted in: 5
- Stolen bases: 1
- Stats at Baseball Reference

Teams
- Washington Senators (1958); Detroit Tigers (1959)

Oswaldo Álvarez González (October 19, 1933 – March 7, 2008) was a Cuban professional baseball player. A shortstop and second baseman born in Bolondron in Matanzas Province, he appeared in 95 Major League Baseball (MLB) games for the Washington Senators (all of 1958) and Detroit Tigers (April 1959). He threw and batted right-handed, stood 5 feet 10 inches (1.78 m) tall and weighed 165 pounds (75 kg).

Álvarez played in the minor leagues from 1952 to 1957 in the Senators' farm system. Primarily known for his speed, he twice led baseball's minor leagues in stolen bases. He made his MLB debut as a late-inning defensive replacement on April 19, 1958, and spent the whole season on the Senators' roster. Playing behind regular shortstop Rocky Bridges, he started 55 games, with another six starts as Washington's second baseman. In 196 at-bats spanning 87 games, he hit .209 with five runs batted in.

Álvarez was traded twice during the 1958–59 offseason. On October 27, he was shipped to the Cleveland Indians for veteran utility man Jay Porter; then, three weeks later, he was part of a major trade between the Indians and Tigers in which he and two top pitchers, Don Mossi and Ray Narleski, were sent to the Tigers for second baseman Billy Martin and pitcher Al Cicotte. In 1959 he appeared in eight early-season games for the Tigers, singling in two at-bats for his only other major league experience.

His MLB career over, he spent the rest of 1959 as a member of three different Triple-A clubs. He led the Mexican League in stolen bases with 27 at age 32 in 1965. He retired from the field after two games with the Charros de Jalisco in 1966.

In his 95 big-league games, Alvarez collected 42 hits, with only three extra-base hits, all doubles. He had one stolen base and batted .212 overall. He scouted for the Pittsburgh Pirates after his playing career ended. Ossie Álvarez died in Guadalajara, Mexico, on March 8, 2008.
