= Ron Shoop =

American baseball player (1931–2003)

- Catcher
- Born: September 19, 1931; Rural Valley, Pennsylvania, U.S.
- Died: March 14, 2003 (aged 71); Rural Valley, Pennsylvania, U.S.
- Batted: Right Threw: Right

MLB debut
- August 22, 1959, for the Detroit Tigers

Last MLB appearance
- September 27, 1959, for the Detroit Tigers

MLB statistics
- Batting average: .143
- Home runs: 0
- Runs batted in: 1
- Stats at Baseball Reference

Teams
- Detroit Tigers (1959)

Ronald Lee Shoop (September 19, 1931 – March 14, 2003) was an American professional baseball player and catcher, who played part of the 1959 season for the Detroit Tigers. Shoop batted and threw right-handed, stood 5 feet 11 inches (1.80 m) tall and weighed 180 pounds (82 kg). His professional career extended for ten years (1951–52 and 1955–62). He missed the 1953–54 seasons while performing military service.

For his MLB career, Shoop compiled a .143 batting average in seven at-bats, with one run batted in. His lone hit, a single, came off Bob Shaw of the Chicago White Sox in Shoop's final big-league game.

He was born and later died in Rural Valley, Pennsylvania, at the age of 71.
