= Mitch Nay =

American baseball player (born 1993)

- Third baseman
- Born: September 20, 1993 (age 32); Chandler, Arizona, U.S.
- Bats: Right Throws: Right

Mitchell Ellis Nay (born September 20, 1993) is an American former professional baseball third baseman. He was drafted out of high school by the Toronto Blue Jays in the first round (58th overall) of the 2012 Major League Baseball draft.

== Career ==
Nay attended Hamilton High School in Chandler, Arizona. He began his high school career as a shortstop, but became a third baseman due to the presence of teammate Jorge Flores. As a junior, Nay had a .495 batting average, 14 home runs, and 54 runs batted in (RBI). He won Arizona's Gatorade Baseball Player of the Year Award in 2012, and received a scholarship to attend Arizona State University. USA Baseball named Nay to their youth baseball team.

=== Toronto Blue Jays ===
The Toronto Blue Jays selected Nay in the supplemental first round of the 2012 Major League Baseball draft, with the 58th overall selection. He signed with Toronto, forgoing his scholarship. He suffered a broken foot and did not make his professional debut until 2013. In 2013, Nay played for the Bluefield Blue Jays of the Rookie-level Appalachian League, where he had a .300 batting average in 64 games. He was promoted to the Vancouver Canadians of the Low–A Northwest League in time for their playoff chase. He was named the most valuable player (MVP) of the Northwest League playoffs by MiLB.com.

Nay began the 2014 season with the Lansing Lugnuts of the Single–A Midwest League. On August 19, while Nay was leading the Midwest League in doubles, the Blue Jays promoted him to the Dunedin Blue Jays of the High–A Florida State League. In 120 games in Lansing, he batted .285 with 34 doubles, three home runs, and 59 RBI. Nay played 11 games in Dunedin, batting .185 with one RBI. On September 24, Nay was named the MVP for Lansing in 2014. Nay played the entire 2015 season in Dunedin, and finished the season batting .243 with five home runs and 42 RBI in 109 games played. Due to injuries, Nay appeared in just eight rehab games for the Gulf Coast League Blue Jays in 2016, and batted .091. In 2017, Nay returned to Lansing and spent the whole season there, posting a .222 batting average with 10 home runs and 40 RBIs in 61 games.

=== Cincinnati Reds ===
On December 14, 2017, Nay was selected by the Cincinnati Reds in the minor league phase of the Rule 5 draft. Nay split the 2018 season between the Double-A Pensacola Blue Wahoos and the High-A Daytona Tortugas, slashing .267/.352/.405 in 132 games between the two teams. He became a free agent after the 2018 season.

On February 24, 2019, Nay re–signed with the Reds organization on a minor league contract. He split the 2019 season between the Double–A Chattanooga Lookouts and Triple–A Louisville Bats, hitting .278/.341/.504 with 17 home runs and 65 RBI in 114 total games. Nay elected free agency following the season on November 4.

=== Seattle Mariners ===
On December 13, 2019, Nay inked a minor league contract with the Seattle Mariners and was assigned to the Double-A Arkansas Travelers. Nay did not play in a game in 2020 due to the cancellation of the minor league season because of the COVID-19 pandemic. On May 28, 2020, Nay was released by the Mariners organization.

=== Los Angeles Angels ===
On December 29, 2020, Nay entered into a minor league contract with the Los Angeles Angels organization. Nay spent the 2021 season with the Double-A Rocket City Trash Pandas, slashing .237/.347/.480 with 23 home runs and 54 RBI in 106 games. He elected free agency following the season on November 7, 2021.

On May 29, 2022, Nay re-signed with the Angels on a new minor league contract. He made 36 appearances split between the High-A Tri-City Dust Devils and rookie-level Arizona Complex League Angels, slashing .189/.272/.303 with 4 home runs and 12 RBI. He was released by the organization on July 29.

=== Kane County Cougars ===
On August 27, 2022, Nay signed with the Kane County Cougars of the American Association of Professional Baseball. He played in 9 games for Kane County, hitting .273/.385/.546 with 2 home runs and 6 RBI. On September 27, Nay was released by the Cougars.

Nay retired following the 2022 season and is currently a realtor in Arizona.

== Personal life ==
Nay's grandfather, Lou Klimchock, is a former MLB player.
