= Stover McIlwain =

American baseball player (1939–1966)

- Pitcher
- Born: September 22, 1939; Savannah, Georgia
- Died: January 15, 1966 (aged 26); Buffalo, New York
- Batted: Right Threw: Right

MLB debut
- September 25, 1957, for the Chicago White Sox

Last MLB appearance
- September 28, 1958, for the Chicago White Sox

MLB statistics
- Win–loss record: 0–0
- Earned run average: 1.80
- Strikeouts: 4
- Innings pitched: 5
- Stats at Baseball Reference

Teams
- Chicago White Sox (1957–1958)

Stover William McIlwain (September 22, 1939 – January 15, 1966), nicknamed "Smokey", was an American professional baseball player. A right-handed pitcher, he appeared in two games for the 1957–58 Chicago White Sox, making his Major League debut just three days after his 18th birthday. The native of Savannah, Georgia, batted right-handed, stood 6 feet 4 inches (1.93 m) tall and weighed 195 pounds (88 kg). He graduated from J. M. Tate High School in Gonzalez, Florida, and attended Rollins College.

McIlwain's two MLB games took place during consecutive Septembers, with a relief appearance in 1957 against the Detroit Tigers and a starting assignment against the Kansas City Athletics in 1958. In the latter game, McIlwain allowed a home run to lead-off batter Lou Klimchock, an 18-year-old rookie. Klimchock remains the youngest player to achieve the feat in major league history. McIlvain settled down to pitch four innings without further scoring, allowing four hits and no bases on balls. He left for a pinch hitter in the home half of the fourth inning with a 2–1 lead in an eventual 11-4 victory.

In his two big league appearances and five innings pitched, McIlwain did not record a win or a loss, gave up six hits and just the one earned run for a lifetime earned run average of 1.80. He notched four strikeouts, all during his 1958 starting assignment. His minor league pitching career, spent entirely in the White Sox' farm system, extended from 1957 through 1963, with 1961–62 spent in military service.

McIlwain died in Buffalo, New York, from testicular cancer at the age of 26 and was interred in Spruell Memorial Cemetery, Cantonment, Florida.
