= Tom Qualters =

American baseball player (1935–2024)

- Pitcher
- Born: April 1, 1935; McKeesport, Pennsylvania, U.S.
- Died: February 15, 2024 (aged 88); Somerset, Pennsylvania, U.S.
- Batted: Right Threw: Right

MLB debut
- September 13, 1953, for the Philadelphia Phillies

Last MLB appearance
- September 25, 1958, for the Chicago White Sox

MLB statistics
- Win–loss record: 0–0
- Earned run average: 5.64
- Strikeouts: 20
- Stats at Baseball Reference

Teams
- Philadelphia Phillies (1953, 1957–1958); Chicago White Sox (1958)

Thomas Francis Qualters (April 1, 1935 – February 15, 2024), nicknamed Money Bags, was an American right-handed Major League Baseball pitcher, born in McKeesport, Pennsylvania. He played with the Philadelphia Phillies and the Chicago White Sox in the 1950s.

At 6 feet (1.83 m) tall, 190 pounds (86 kg), pitcher Qualters was a bonus baby with the Philadelphia Phillies, signed out of high school for $40,000. He made his major league debut on September 13, 1953. He had an unusual rookie year, as he posted an ERA of 162.00. In his only appearance that year, he allowed six earned runs and retired just one batter. However, he remained on the Phillies' roster for two years (1953 and 1954), only appearing in that one game, and earning the nickname "Money Bags" from his teammates. After spending two years in the International League, he had a couple more cups of coffee with Philadelphia (pitching in six games in 1957 and one in 1958) before being sent to the Chicago White Sox. He pitched respectably for the Sox in 1958, but did not record a win, loss or save. His final major league game was September 25, 1958. Qualters continued to pitch in the minors, mainly at the Triple-A level, through the end of 1962.

In total, Qualters appeared in 34 games without a major-league decision. He is the only pitcher to appear on a Topps baseball card four times without ever recording a win or loss.

After his baseball career ended, Qualters worked for the Pennsylvania Fish and Boat Commission as a law enforcement officer.

Qualters lived in Somerset, Pennsylvania, and was married to Beverly Qualters. He had five children, eight grandchildren and 14 great-grandchildren. Tom Qualters died on February 15, 2024, at the age of 88.
