= Jim Proctor =

American baseball player (born 1935)

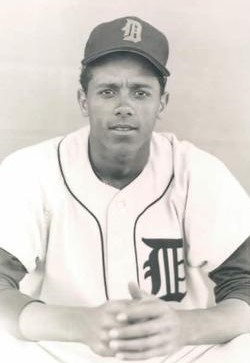
- Pitcher
- Born: September 9, 1935 (age 90); Brandywine, Maryland, U.S.
- Batted: Right Threw: Right

MLB debut
- September 14, 1959, for the Detroit Tigers

Last MLB appearance
- September 26, 1959, for the Detroit Tigers

MLB statistics
- Win–loss record: 0–1
- Earned run average: 16.88
- Strikeouts: 0
- Stats at Baseball Reference

Teams
- Detroit Tigers (1959)

James Arthur Proctor (born September 9, 1935) is an American former professional baseball player. A pitcher, he appeared in two games for the Detroit Tigers of Major League Baseball during the 1959 season. He is one of the last major-leaguers to play in the Negro leagues, and one of the first African-Americans to appear in a Tiger uniform.

Proctor was born in Brandywine, Maryland. He graduated from Frederick Douglass High School in Prince George's County and attended the University of Maryland Eastern Shore. The 6 ft (1.8 m), 165 lb (75 kg) right-hander began his professional career in the Milwaukee Braves' organization in 1955, but was released after five games in the Class D Florida State League, enduring the strict racial segregation of the Jim Crow era. He then signed as a free agent with Indianapolis Clowns of the Negro American League, where he won 16 games and lost seven. After the season, the Clowns sold Proctor's contract to the Detroit Tigers' organization.

Upon his return to "Organized Baseball" in 1956, Proctor reached double-figures in games won in three of the next four seasons. Finally, in 1959, in the Sally League, he posted a 15–5 record, led the circuit in complete games (20), finished second in earned run average (2.19), and was named Pitcher of the Year.

When rosters expanded to 40 men after September 1, 1959, the Tigers called him to the majors. The 15th of the then-16 MLB teams to break the color line, the Tigers had been integrated by Afro-Latino Ozzie Virgil Sr. in 1958; Baseball Hall of Famer Larry Doby had become the club's first U.S.-born Black player as a 35-year-old veteran on April 10, 1959, during his brief stint with the team. The 24-year-old Proctor became the first African-American to graduate from the Tiger farm system.

Hampered by a sore shoulder, Proctor appeared in two games over the 1959 campaign's final month. He debuted September 14 against the Washington Senators at Griffith Stadium, throwing two innings of relief and allowing four hits and one earned run. Then, 12 days later at Detroit's Briggs Stadium, he was the starting pitcher against the league champion Chicago White Sox. He retired Chicago's first two men, including future Hall-of-Famer Nellie Fox, but then allowed the next six players to reach base on four hits and two bases on balls. He left the mound trailing 4–0 and was tagged with the loss, his only decision in the majors.

Proctor returned to the minor leagues in 1960 and promptly won 15 games in the Double-A Texas League. But his career was winding down; he struggled at Triple-A in 1961, missed the 1962 season entirely, and left Organized Baseball after eight games in the Double-A Sally League in 1963. In the majors, he allowed eight hits, three bases on balls, and five earned runs in 22/3 innings pitched, for an ERA of 16.88. His stellar minor league record was 59–41 in 190 games pitched.

Proctor's grandson James is a Princeton University graduate who pitched in the Cincinnati Reds' organization in 2021 and 2022 before a shoulder injury ended his career. He remained in baseball in 2023 as an executive in the office of the Commissioner of Baseball.
