= Hal Trosky Jr. =

American baseball player (1936–2012)

- Pitcher
- Born: September 29, 1936; Cleveland, Ohio, U.S.
- Died: November 23, 2012 (aged 76); Swisher, Iowa, U.S.
- Batted: Right Threw: Right

MLB debut
- September 25, 1958, for the Chicago White Sox

Last MLB appearance
- September 28, 1958, for the Chicago White Sox

MLB statistics
- Win–loss record: 1–0
- Earned run average: 6.00
- Innings pitched: 3
- Stats at Baseball Reference

Teams
- Chicago White Sox (1958)

Harold Arthur Trosky Jr. (September 29, 1936 – November 23, 2012) was an American professional baseball player who appeared as a pitcher in Major League Baseball in two games for the Chicago White Sox during the 1958 season. Born in Cleveland, Ohio, he was the son of Hal Trosky Sr., the Indians' slugging first baseman who played 11 seasons in the major leagues. Hal Jr. threw and batted right-handed, stood 6 feet 3 inches (1.91 m) tall and weighed 205 pounds (93 kg).

Trosky grew up in Iowa, his father's native state, and signed with the White Sox as a first baseman in 1954 after graduating from St. Patrick's High School in Cedar Rapids. But he was plagued by injuries during his first two professional seasons in the minor leagues, and was converted to pitcher in 1956. After winning 36 games over his first three campaigns the mound, Trosky was called up the ChiSox in September 1958. Late in the month, he appeared in two games as a reliever, both of them at Comiskey Park.

On September 25, against the Detroit Tigers, he entered the game in the fifth inning with Detroit ahead 5–0. He allowed a single to the first hitter he faced, Billy Martin, but then struck out Tiger slugger Charlie Maxwell, with Martin erased when he was caught stealing. When Red Wilson grounded out to end the frame, Trosky had escaped unscathed from his MLB debut. Three days later, against the Kansas City Athletics, he relieved starter Stover McIlwain, again in the fifth, but with Chicago ahead 3–1. This time, he hurled two innings, including the decisive fifth which made the game "official." By his second frame on the mound, the White Sox had increased their lead to 6–1. Trosky then allowed three runs (with one unearned) to the Athletics in the sixth, and departed the contest with the White Sox still leading at 6–4. When Chicago cruised to an 11–4 triumph, Trosky was credited with his first big-league victory. It would be his last MLB appearance and his only decision.

In his two MLB games pitched, Trosky allowed five hits, two earned runs, and two bases on balls, with one strikeout, in three full innings pitched.

His minor league career ended in 1960 after seven seasons, and Trosky returned to Cedar Rapids, where he spent fifty years in the insurance field. He died at 76 in Hiawatha, Iowa, on November 23, 2012.

== See also ==
- List of second-generation Major League Baseball players
