= Bill Norman (baseball) =

American baseball player and coach (1910–1962)

- Outfielder / Coach / Manager / Scout
- Born: July 16, 1910; St. Louis, Missouri, U.S.
- Died: April 21, 1962 (aged 51); Milwaukee, Wisconsin, U.S.
- Batted: Right Threw: Right

MLB debut
- August 8, 1931, for the Chicago White Sox

Last MLB appearance
- September 24, 1932, for the Chicago White Sox

MLB statistics
- Batting average: .204
- Home runs: 0
- Runs batted in: 8
- Win–loss record: 58–64
- Winning %: .475
- Stats at Baseball Reference

Teams
- As player: Chicago White Sox (1931–1932); As manager: Detroit Tigers (1958–1959); As coach: St. Louis Browns (1952–1953)

Henry Willis Patrick "Bill" Norman (July 16, 1910 – April 21, 1962) was an American professional baseball outfielder, coach, manager and scout in Major League Baseball. A longtime minor league player and manager, he is best remembered for his brief term as pilot of the Detroit Tigers in 1958–59.

== Playing career ==
Norman was born in St. Louis, Missouri, and served as a bat boy for the St. Louis Browns as a 12-year-old. He attended St. Louis University and signed his first professional baseball contract in 1929. A right-handed hitting and throwing outfielder who stood 6 feet 2 inches (1.88 m) tall and weighed 190 pounds (86 kg), he rose quickly to the Major League level as player.

At 21 years old, he was called up to the Chicago White Sox in 1931 after hitting .366 in the Class C Western Association. But he got into only 37 games with the 1931–32 White Sox, batted only .204 in 103 at bats, and would spend the rest of his playing career in the minors, where he batted .303 with 292 home runs in 2,092 games. Norman led the Class A1 Texas League in runs batted in (1941), and the top-level American Association in home runs (1942).

== Managing career ==
In June 1946, he became manager of the Toronto Maple Leafs of the Triple-A International League, then spent five seasons as a manager in the Cleveland Indians' farm system, winning consecutive Eastern League pennants with the Wilkes-Barre Barons in 1950–51.

Norman then served as a coach for his hometown Browns for in 1952–53 – the Browns' last seasons in St. Louis before moving to Baltimore. In 1954, he joined the Tigers' organization as a scout and minor league manager.

He manage the Terre Haute Huts in the Three-I League (Class B) in 1956 and lead the club to a 10–3 record to start the year. He was then transferred to manage the Augusta Tigers of the South Atlantic League (Class A). He rose to the Triple-A level as skipper of the Charleston Senators of the American Association in 1957. The following season, the Tigers – struggling at 21–28 under Jack Tighe on June 10 – promoted Norman to manager. He led them to 56 victories in 105 games and a fifth-place finish.

But during the 1950s, the Tigers were undergoing a period of transition in their ownership and front office and in rebuilding mode on the field. They began 1959 with one of the worst starts in their history, losing 15 of their first 17 games. Norman could not survive the catastrophic streak; he was fired in favor of Jimmie Dykes on May 3.

Norman then rejoined his first MLB team, the White Sox, as a scout. In 1961 he returned to the minor leagues when he was named manager of the Chisox' Triple-A affiliate, the San Diego Padres of the Pacific Coast League, on July 12. It was his last year in baseball. After he returned to his job as a White Sox scout, Norman died from a heart attack at the outset of the 1962 season, in Milwaukee, Wisconsin, at the age of 51.

=== Managerial record ===
Team	Year	Regular season					Postseason			
Team	Year	Games	Won	Lost	Win %	Finish	Won	Lost	Win %	Result
DET	1958	105	56	49	.533	Hired June 10; 5th in AL	–	–	–	
DET	1959	17	2	15	.118	8th in AL; Fired May 3	–	–	–	
Total		122	58	64	.475		0	0	–	
