= Johnnie Vivens =

American baseball player

- Pitcher
- Born: May 22, 1896; Fayette, Missouri, U.S.
- Died: February 2, 1958 (aged 61); Columbia, Missouri, U.S.

Negro league baseball debut
- 1929, for the St. Louis Stars

Last appearance
- 1929, for the St. Louis Stars

Teams
- St. Louis Stars (1929)

Johnnie Lee Vivens (May 22, 1896 – February 2, 1958) was an American Negro league pitcher in the 1920s.

A native of Fayette, Missouri, Vivens played for the St. Louis Stars in 1929. He died in Columbia, Missouri in 1958 at age 61.
