= Ray Narleski =

American baseball player (1928–2012)

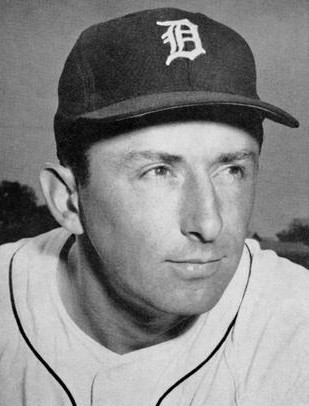
- Narleski in 1959
- Pitcher
- Born: November 25, 1928; Camden, New Jersey, U.S.
- Died: March 29, 2012 (aged 83); Gloucester Township, New Jersey, U.S.
- Batted: Right Threw: Right

MLB debut
- April 17, 1954, for the Cleveland Indians

Last MLB appearance
- September 13, 1959, for the Detroit Tigers

MLB statistics
- Win–loss record: 43–33
- Earned run average: 3.60
- Strikeouts: 454
- Saves: 58
- Stats at Baseball Reference

Teams
- Cleveland Indians (1954–1958); Detroit Tigers (1959)

Career highlights and awards
- 2× All-Star (1956, 1958)

Raymond Edmond Narleski (November 25, 1928 – March 29, 2012) was an American relief pitcher in Major League Baseball (MLB) who played with the Cleveland Indians (1954–58) and Detroit Tigers (1959). He batted and threw right-handed. His father, Bill Narleski, was a shortstop, second baseman and third baseman for the Boston Red Sox from 1929 to 1930.

== Early life ==
Narleski was born on November 25, 1928, in Camden, New Jersey, one of five children in his family. His father, Bill Narleski, played two seasons of Major League Baseball for the Boston Red Sox (1929-30). Narleski attributed his later success as a pitcher to his father practicing with him, and advising him to "'Never give in to a hitter'".

Narleski attended Collingswood High School, where he pitched on the baseball team. In 1947, he was named third-team All-State as a pitcher among all New Jersey high schools, second-team among public high schools, and first-team among Group 4 high schools. Narleski had an exceptional fast ball in high school, reaching speeds of almost 100 miles per hour; but his control was not always good, which instilled fear in opposing batters.

Narleski was also an offensive back, quarterback, kicker and punter on Collingswood's football team. His brother Ted Narleski (who would also go on to play professional baseball) was his teammate.

== Professional career ==
In 1948, the Cleveland Indians signed Narleski as an amateur free agent.

=== Minor league career ===
He played in Cleveland's minor league farm system from 1948 to 1953 (other than in 1949). In 1948, he was assigned to the Wilkes-Barre Barons of the Single-A Eastern League. He started 13 of the 20 games in which he pitched, with a 2–10 win–loss record and 4.37 earned run average (ERA). He left professional baseball in 1949 because he was not making enough money to support his wife Ruth, who was pregnant, and went to work at the RTC Shipyard in Camden, New Jersey. He made $100/week at RTC, and played semi-professional baseball on the weekends, for five different teams, making as much as $50/game.

While playing semipro baseball, because of his exceptional fastball he once again drew the attention of professional scouts; including from the New York Yankees. Cleveland then agreed to pay him what he asked, and he rejoined the organization, playing for the Class B Cedar Rapids Indians in 1950 for $600/week. He had a 9–5 record in 17 games, with a 3.57 ERA and 114 strikeouts in 111 innings pitched.

In 1951, he was promoted to the Double-A Dallas Eagles of the Texas League. He started 32 games, with a 15–8 record and 2.42 ERA. The following season, he was promoted to the Triple-A Indianapolis Indians. Narleski was 11–15, with a 4.67 ERA in 24 starts and 17 relief appearances.

He returned to Indianapolis in 1953, starting 10 games and pitching 23 games in relief. Narleski was 6–8, with a 4.36 ERA that season. Indianapolis manager Birdie Tebbetts had met with Narleski to explain his reasoning for making Narleski primarily a relief pitcher. Narleski was reluctant about the move. Tebbetts showed Narleski a statistical comparison demonstrating Narleski was highly effective when pitching less than three innings, but tailed off once he exceeded that span. Tebbetts also told Narleski that he would reach the Major Leagues faster as a relief pitcher. Narleski would have been called up to Cleveland that season, but suffered a broken jaw in a collision with one of his teammates.

=== Major league career ===
He joined Cleveland in 1954. The team wanted to use him as relief pitcher, not a starter; and he pitched in relief in 40 out of his 42 games that year. The starting pitching staff included three future Hall of Fame pitchers, Bob Feller, Bob Lemon and Early Wynn, along with All-Star pitcher Mike Garcia. The rookie Narleski was joined in the bullpen by left-handed pitchers Don Mossi and Hal Newhouser (another future Hall of Fame pitcher). In Narleski's first game as a reliever for the Indians he pitched two shutout innings, and then in his next game he struck out four batters in two innings (including three consecutive strikeouts), giving him the confidence he could be a successful relief pitcher in the Major Leagues. One practical problem for Narleski was that relief pitchers could not make as much money as starting pitchers, and he maintained an ambition to be a starter.

Narleski led the 1954 team with 13 saves (on a team where the starters threw 77 complete games). He was 3–3, with a 2.22 ERA and 52 strikeouts in 89 innings pitched. Wynn and Lemon won 23 games each, Garcia 19, Feller 13 and fifth starter Art Houtteman won 15. Mossi had a 1.94 ERA, with seven saves and a 6–1 record, and Newhouser was 7–2, with a 2.51 ERA and seven saves. The Indians won the 1954 American League pennant with a 111–43 record; the highest winning percentage of any team in MLB history (.721). However, they were swept by the New York Giants in the 1954 World Series. Narleski pitched four innings in two World Series games, giving up only one run. He struck out the Giants' star pinch hitter Dusty Rhodes on three pitches, who was otherwise 4-for-5 with two home runs and seven RBI in the series.

In 1955, Narleski led all Major League pitchers with 19 saves. He tied for the Major League lead among all pitchers with 60 games pitched, all but one in relief. He had a 9–1 record and 3.71 ERA, in 111.2 innings pitched. He was sixth in NL Most Valuable Player voting. He was, however, subject to nagging injuries in 1955 and the following season. In 1956, he was selected to the AL All-Star team, and finished the season with a career low 1.52 ERA. However, his innings pitched fell to 59.1 and he had only four saves; with the Indians' primary closer role taken up by Mossi. Narleski and Mossi were considered the best bullpen tandem in baseball. They were also roommates with Cleveland from their rookie year in 1954 to 1958 when they were both traded to the Detroit Tigers.

In 1955, Feller was replaced by Rookie of the Year Herb Score as one of Cleveland's four main starters. Score was 20–9 the following year, but in May 1957 his career was derailed by a serious eye injury. In 1957, Narleski fractured a finger during spring training. But with Feller gone, Score lost to injury and Garcia, Wynn and Lemon declining, Narleski and Mossi were put in the starting rotation. Mossi started 22 games, and Narleski started 15 of the 46 games in which he appeared. He had an 11–5 record, 16 saves, a 3.09 ERA and 93 strikeouts in 154.1 innings pitched.

Before the season started in 1958, New York Yankees manager Casey Stengel had considered trading his second baseman Bobby Richardson for Narleski, but did not pursue the deal. He publicly said that based on what he perceived as Narleski's performance decline in the preceding seasons, Narleski was a "sore arm pitcher". In 1958, Narleski pitched more games as a starter (24) than as a reliever (20). He finished the season 13–10, with a 4.07 ERA in 183.1 innings pitched; with only a single save.

He had 10 wins at the All-Star break and was selected to the 1958 AL All-Star team for the second time. He pitched 3.1 innings, giving up only one hit (a pop single to Frank Thomas) and one walk. AL manager Stengel chose Narleski to replace starter Bob Turley of the Yankees in the second inning, after Turley had given up three runs. Narleski did not allow another run, with the American League winning the game 4–3 because of the excellent pitching of Narleski, Early Wynn (now with the White Sox) and Baltimore's Billy O'Dell.

In November 1958, Cleveland traded Narleski, Mossi and Ossie Alvarez to the Detroit Tigers for Billy Martin and Al Cicotte. Hampered by shoulder problems in 1959, Narleski finished 4–12 with a 5.78 ERA and five saves in 42 games. It was his last Major League season. Narleski missed the entire 1960 season due to a ruptured disc that required surgery. Narleski went to Tigers spring training camp in 1961 but quit the club when Detroit would not tell him whether he would make the roster or not. Narleski saying "I won't go back to the minors", because it "means another year out of my arm and I'm too old for that".

In a six-season career, Narleski posted a 43–33 record with 454 strikeouts, a 3.60 ERA, and 58 saves in 702 innings. He made the American League All-Star team in 1956 and 1958.

== Legacy and honors ==
Peter Gammons included Narleski as among the great fastball relief pitchers. In discussing the fastest pitchers he had ever faced, Yogi Berra included Narleski among Bob Feller, Herb Score and Dick Radatz. He also had a good assortment of off-speed pitches to complement his fastball. When he came up with Cleveland as a relief pitcher, he used three pitches, "a mid-90s fastball, a curve and a changeup".

In the 1950s, it was unusual to have two relief pitchers of high quality like Narleski and Don Mossi on the same team; and it allowed Indians manager Al López to better utilize his superb starting pitchers. Bob Lemon said that the addition of Narleski and Mossi as relievers on the 1954 team is what made them a great pitching staff. López would no longer force the starters to pitch too long as he did in years past; and it also allowed the starters to go all out while pitching, knowing that Narleski or Mossi would come in when they needed a breather. During their years together in Cleveland, the two were known as the finest bullpen combination in baseball. Narleski and Mossi have been considered one of the best right-hand/left-hand relief pitcher combinations in MLB history.

Narleski was selected to the Top 100 Greatest Indians Roster as part of the club's 100th Anniversary Celebration in 2001.

In 2000, the Courier-Post selected Narleski to its All-Century Classic Era Team (1939-74) for South New Jersey high school baseball.

Narleski was an overpowering pitcher with a blazing fastball which he mixed with a sharp-breaking curve and a change-up that kept hitters guessing.

== Personal life and death ==
After his retirement, Narleski lived in Laurel Springs, New Jersey. He played semipro baseball in the early to mid-1960s, and he worked for the H.A. Dehart trucking company in Thorofare, New Jersey until 1990. In 1964, he was successfully pitching semipro baseball for the Melini Goodyears in the Cumberland County League, and was described as still having a "humming fastball". The Philadelphia Phillies considered signing him in 1964, but dropped the idea after the Tigers demanded compensation. The Goodyears won the 1964 Cumberland County League championship, with Narleski earning a save in the last game of a three-game sweep in the championship series; and being the winning pitcher in four of the team's five playoff victories. The Tigers only formally released Narleski in 1979.

In addition to his father playing Major League Baseball, his son Steve Narleski pitched in the minor leagues from 1977 to 1983. His brother Ted played minor league baseball in the Cleveland Indians' farm system, and nephew Billy Narleski also played minor league baseball.

A resident of Gloucester Township, New Jersey at the time of his death, Narleski died at the age of 83 on March 29, 2012. He is buried in Eglington Cemetery, Clarksboro, New Jersey. He had been married to Ruth (Gilbert) Narleski for 63 years at the time he died, who survived him along with three children, five grandchildren and five great-grandchidlren.

== See also ==
- List of Major League Baseball annual saves leaders
- List of second-generation Major League Baseball players
