= Bob Hegman =

American baseball player (born 1958)

- shortstop
- Born: February 26, 1958 (age 68); Springfield, Minnesota
- Batted: Right Threw: Right

MLB debut
- August 8, 1985, for the Kansas City Royals

Last MLB appearance
- August 8, 1985, for the Kansas City Royals

MLB statistics
- Games played: 1
- At bats: 0
- Hits: 0
- Stats at Baseball Reference

Teams
- Kansas City Royals (1985)

Robert Hilmer Hegman (born February 26, 1958), is an American former Major League Baseball player who played in 1985 with the World Series champion Kansas City Royals. Hegman attended St. Cloud State University. Primarily a shortstop during his pro playing career, Hegman threw and batted right-handed, stood 6 feet 1 inch (1.85 m) tall and weighed 180 pounds (82 kg).

His one big-league game came on August 8, 1985, when he replaced George Brett in the lineup for the ninth inning. Greg Pryor, who had been playing second base, moved over to third base to replace Brett defensively, while Hegman took his position at second base. He played just one inning without a fielding chance.

Later when asked if he received a World Series ring, Hegman replied, "Heck, all I got was a $100 check. I should have kept it and framed it, but I had to eat".

He remained with the Royals for 16 seasons (1987–2002) after his playing career ended and served ten seasons (1993–2002) as the club's director or senior director of minor league operations. He was dismissed by then-Royals general manager Allard Baird in July 2002 in a streamlining of the Kansas City front office.

He later worked as a Major League scout for the Minnesota Twins.
