= Don Mossi =

American baseball player (1929–2019)

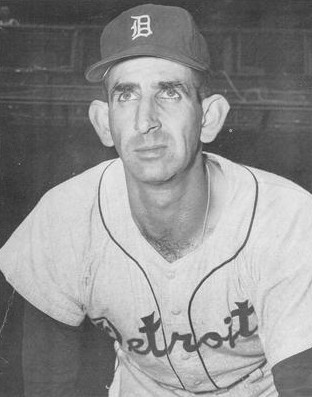
- Pitcher
- Born: January 11, 1929; St. Helena, California, U.S.
- Died: July 19, 2019 (aged 90); Nampa, Idaho, U.S.
- Batted: Left Threw: Left

MLB debut
- April 17, 1954, for the Cleveland Indians

Last MLB appearance
- October 1, 1965, for the Kansas City Athletics

MLB statistics
- Win–loss record: 101–80
- Earned run average: 3.43
- Strikeouts: 932
- Saves: 50
- Stats at Baseball Reference

Teams
- Cleveland Indians (1954–1958); Detroit Tigers (1959–1963); Chicago White Sox (1964); Kansas City Athletics (1965)

Career highlights and awards
- All-Star (1957)

Donald Louis Mossi (January 11, 1929 – July 19, 2019) was an American Major League Baseball (MLB) pitcher from 1954 to 1965. He was a left-handed control pitcher whose strikeout-to-walk ratio was regularly among the league leaders (he led the league in 1961). He retired with 101 wins, 50 saves, and a career earned run average of 3.43.

== Early life ==
Mossi was born in St. Helena, California, the son of Patience (Woodworth) and Louis Mossi. He grew up in Daly City and went to Jefferson High School. At Jefferson High he was a star football player, twice earning all-Peninsula Athletic League honors as a quarterback.

== Professional career ==
Mossi was spotted at an early age and signed by the Cleveland Indians after leaving high school in 1949. He was assigned to Class-A Bakersfield. At Bakersfield, Mossi exhibited control issues; he walked 115 batters in 195 innings in his first year. He nonetheless progressed with his career, posting a 2.92 ERA in 122 innings for the Wichita Indians in 1951.

Mossi was given a spot in the Indians' bullpen for the 1954 season; as a fifth year professional, major league rules at the time would have forced the Indians to put him through waivers had he not been given a spot on the team. The quality of the Indians' rotation at that time—which included Early Wynn, Bob Lemon, Bob Feller, Hal Newhouser and Mike Garcia—meant that Mossi, who had always been a starter, had to be used as a reliever. His major league debut came on April 17 of that year in an 8–1 loss to the Chicago White Sox as Mossi pitched three innings and allowed one run. The first batter Mossi faced as a major leaguer was future Hall-of-Famer Nellie Fox, who reached base on an error. His first strikeout was against Sherm Lollar to end the inning. In his first season in the majors, Mossi recorded an ERA of 1.94 in 93 innings pitched as the Indians advanced to the 1954 World Series, the only World Series of Mossi's career. The Indians were swept in the series, and Mossi pitched four innings in three games, allowing no runs.

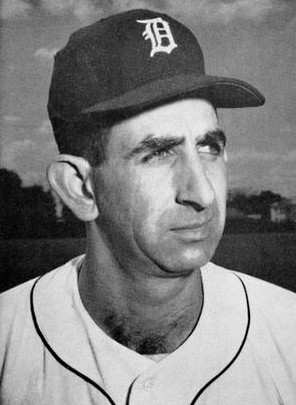
Mossi, circa 1959

In 1957, he and fellow reliever Ray Narleski, who was also Mossi's roommate, were moved to the starting rotation. Mossi finished the season with a record of 11–10 and an ERA of 4.13 on a team that finished below .500. He was named an American League All-Star that season. In the all-star game, a 6–5 American League win, Mossi entered the game to pitch the bottom of the ninth in relief of Billy Pierce, who had already allowed two runs in the inning to cut the American League's lead to 6–4. Mossi entered with two runners on base and the potential winning run at the plate. Mossi struck out future Hall-of-Famer Eddie Mathews, then gave up a single to future Hall-of-Famer Ernie Banks, which cut the lead to 6–5, but Gus Bell was thrown out at third base for the second out. Bob Grim then relieved Mossi and recorded the final out.

The following season, he returned to anchoring the bullpen for the Indians. Mossi, along with Narleski and Ossie Alvarez, was traded to the Detroit Tigers on November 20, 1958 for Billy Martin and Al Cicotte. The trade meant that Mossi was guaranteed a spot in a major league starting rotation, something he had missed with the Indians. He went 17–9 with a 3.36 ERA in 1959. In 1960 he went 9–8, albeit on a club that was well below .500, with an ERA of 3.47. Mossi pitched the greatest season of his career in 1961, going 15–7 with a 2.96 ERA on a Tigers club that recorded over 100 wins. It was not long after this that he began to experience problems with his throwing arm, and in his final two years with the Tigers he went 18–20 with a combined ERA of 4.01. He spent the final two years of his career as a short-reliever, his arm no longer capable of starting. Prior to the 1964 season he was dealt to the White Sox, before finishing his career in 1965 with the Kansas City Athletics.

During his 12-year major league career, Mossi won 101 games, lost 80 (.558), and posted an ERA of 3.43. In 460 games pitched, including 165 games started, he registered 55 complete games, eight shutouts, and 50 saves. He allowed 1,493 hits and 385 bases on balls in 1,548 innings pitched, striking out 932. Mossi's career fielding percentage of .990 was the highest ever recorded by a pitcher when he retired. Though never recognized for his defense, he handled 311 chances while committing just three errors.

== After baseball ==
After retiring as a player, he moved to Ukiah, California, where he lived with his wife, son and two daughters. He worked as a supervisor in a Masonite factory before retiring. In retirement, he enjoyed hunting and fishing. In 2014, he was named by the Cleveland Indians as one of the Top 100 Greatest Indians.

After the death of Ray Narleski (2012) and third baseman Al Rosen (2015), Mossi became the last surviving member of the 1954 Indians' pitching staff. Mossi died on July 19, 2019, at age 90 in Nampa, Idaho.
