= Rod Graber =

American baseball player (1930–2014)

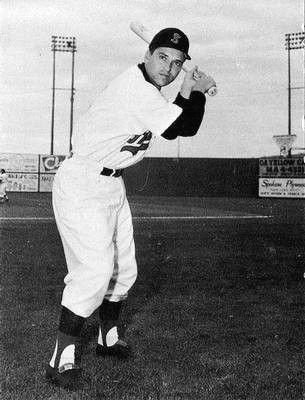
- Center fielder
- Born: June 20, 1930; Massillon, Ohio, U.S.
- Died: December 5, 2014 (aged 84); San Diego, California, U.S.
- Batted: Left Threw: Left

MLB debut
- September 9, 1958, for the Cleveland Indians

Last MLB appearance
- September 24, 1958, for the Cleveland Indians

MLB statistics
- Batting average: .125
- Hits: 1
- Home runs: 0
- Stats at Baseball Reference

Teams
- Cleveland Indians (1958)

Rodney Blaine Graber (June 20, 1930 – December 5, 2014) was an American former Major League Baseball center fielder. He was signed as an amateur free agent by the Cleveland Indians in 1949. He did not play in the major leagues until 1958, where he went 1 for 8 over two games played as an outfielder. He did not make an error and had four putouts.
