= Fred Hatfield =

American baseball player (1925–1998)

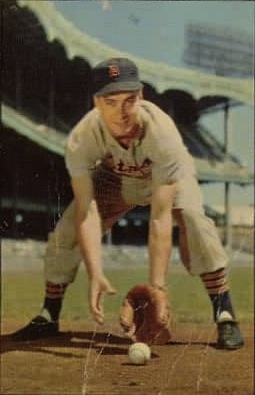
- Hatfield, c. 1953
- Third baseman
- Born: March 18, 1925; Lanett, Alabama, U.S.
- Died: May 22, 1998 (aged 73); Tallahassee, Florida, U.S.
- Batted: Left Threw: Right

MLB debut
- August 31, 1950, for the Boston Red Sox

Last MLB appearance
- May 13, 1958, for the Cincinnati Redlegs

MLB statistics
- Batting average: .242
- Home runs: 23
- Runs batted in: 165
- Stats at Baseball Reference

Teams
- Boston Red Sox (1950–1952); Detroit Tigers (1952–1956); Chicago White Sox (1956–1957); Cleveland Indians (1958); Cincinnati Redlegs (1958)

Fred James Hatfield (March 18, 1925 – May 22, 1998), nicknamed "Scrap Iron", was an American Major League Baseball infielder who played nine seasons in the Major Leagues with the Boston Red Sox (1950–52), Detroit Tigers (1952–56), Chicago White Sox (1956–57), Cleveland Indians (1958) and Cincinnati Redlegs (1958). He batted left-handed, threw right-handed, and was listed as 6 feet 1 inch (1.85 m) tall and 171 pounds (78 kg).

== Playing career ==
Born in Lanett, Alabama, Hatfield attended Birmingham–Southern College and Troy State College before Hatfield was signed by the Red Sox as an amateur free agent in 1942. As a big-leaguer, Hatfield played in 722 games and had a career batting average of .242 with an on-base percentage of .332. He had 493 hits, 248 bases on balls, and 165 RBIs.

Hatfield played in the infield, with 408 games at third base, 179 games at second base, and 27 games at shortstop.

Hatfield was among the American League leaders in being hit by pitch in 1952, 1954, 1956, and 1957. He was also among the league leaders in 1955 for sacrifice hits and intentional walks.

== Coaching career ==
As his playing career wound down in the minor leagues in the late 1950s, Hatfield became a professional baseball manager and coach, and a college baseball coach. He skippered teams in the minors for 16 years between 1960 and 1986, spent two seasons (1977–78) as the third-base coach on Ralph Houk's Detroit Tigers staff, and five years (1964–68) as head baseball coach of the Florida State Seminoles, where he posted a 161–57 (.739) record. He was posthumously inducted into the Florida State University Hall of Fame in 1999.

Hatfield died in 1998 at age 73 in Tallahassee, Florida.

Sporting positions
Preceded by Joe Schultz	Detroit Tigers third-base coach 1977–1978	Succeeded by Eddie Brinkman
