= Control pitcher =

Baseball pitcher who emphasizes accurate pitches

In baseball, a control pitcher, also known as a finesse pitcher, is a pitcher who succeeds mostly by using accurate pitches, as opposed to a power pitcher who relies on velocity. By issuing a below average number of bases on balls they exhibit good control of their pitches. Pitchers with good control are said to be able to throw all the pitches in their repertoire for strikes in different locations regardless of the batter, count and score. According to Curt Schilling, "Control is the ability to throw strikes, and command is the ability to throw quality strikes." Another definition of control is "The ability to deliver the ball to the plate with accuracy." The best control pitchers will walk as few as one batter per game. Control is also key to getting ahead in the count, and thus gaining the advantage over batters to keep them off base. Statistics used to measure control include:

- Walks per nine innings
- Strikeout-to-walk ratio

Control pitchers, who succeed by avoiding surrendering walks, are different from power pitchers who succeed by striking out batters and keeping the ball out of play. Three of the most famous examples of control pitchers in the history of baseball are Christy Mathewson, Ferguson Jenkins, and Greg Maddux, though Maddux and Jenkins have also had significant strikeout totals (they are members of the 3,000 strikeout club) because of their ability to change speeds and the deceptive nature of their pitches.
