= Al Cicotte =

American baseball player (1929–1982)

- Pitcher
- Born: December 23, 1929; Melvindale, Michigan, U.S.
- Died: November 29, 1982 (aged 52); Westland, Michigan, U.S.
- Batted: Right Threw: Right

MLB debut
- April 22, 1957, for the New York Yankees

Last MLB appearance
- May 8, 1962, for the Houston Colt .45s

MLB statistics
- Win–loss record: 10–13
- Earned run average: 4.36
- Strikeouts: 149
- Stats at Baseball Reference

Teams
- New York Yankees (1957); Washington Senators (1958); Detroit Tigers (1958); Cleveland Indians (1959); St. Louis Cardinals (1961); Houston Colt .45s (1962)

Alva Warren Cicotte (/ˈsiːkɒt/ SEE-kot; December 23, 1929 – November 29, 1982), nicknamed "Bozo", was a Major League Baseball (MLB) player. Cicotte pitched in 102 MLB games, 16 as a starter, and compiled a record of 10–13. In 260 innings pitched, Cicotte had an earned run average of 4.36.

Originally signed by the New York Yankees in 1948, he played in their minor league system for the following decade before making his major league debut on April 22, 1957. He pitched in 20 games for the Yankees and had a 2–2 record and a 3.03 earned run average (ERA). He spent the next two seasons with the Washington Senators (1958), Detroit Tigers (1958), and Cleveland Indians (1959) He spent 1960 in the minor leagues, where he pitched an 11-inning no-hitter for the International League Toronto Maple Leafs against the Montreal Royals on September 3, 1960. He walked four batters, three of them in the first inning, and retired 29 men in a row until infielder Sparky Anderson bobbled a ball in the 11th. For the year, he had a 16–7 record, a 1.79 ERA, and 158 strikeouts, winning the International League Triple Crown. He finished his career with the St. Louis Cardinals in 1961 and the Houston Colt .45's in 1962.

Cicotte went into the insurance business after retiring. He signed with the Detroit Tigers in 1977 for one month in order to be eligible for an MLB pension. He died in 1982 at age 52 in Westland, Michigan. He was a great-nephew of Eddie Cicotte, who was one of the "Black Sox" banned from baseball for their alleged involvement in fixing the 1919 World Series.
